= List of Neighbours characters introduced in 2008 =

The following is a list of characters that first appeared in the Network Ten soap opera Neighbours in 2008, by order of first appearance. In December 2007, it was announced that Susan Bower would be taking over the role of executive producer from Ric Pellizzeri, who had been with the show for five years. The 24th season of Neighbours began airing on 14 January 2008 and Bower started on set on 21 January 2008. On 26 May, Bower's name was added to the credits alongside Pellizzeri's. January saw the birth of Chloe Cammeniti, the first child of the established Carmella Cammeniti and Oliver Barnes. Singer Dean Geyer was cast in the full-time role of Ty Harper and models Erin McNaught and Imogen Bailey were cast in the roles of Sienna Cammeniti and Nicola West respectively. Scott Major, who previously played Darren Stark in 1993, rejoined Neighbours as Daniel Fitzgerald's brother. Kyle Canning arrived in November. Mauricio Merino, Jr. and Chelsea Jones joined the cast in December as established character Donna Freedman's siblings Simon and Tegan.

== Chloe Cammeniti ==
Chloe Cammeniti
- Neighbours character
- Portrayed by: Sarah May (2008); Daisy Zandveld (2011)
- Duration: 2008, 2011
- First appearance: 21 January 2008
- Last appearance: 15 March 2011
- Introduced by: Ric Pellizzeri (2008); Susan Bower (2011)
In-universe information
- Father: Oliver Barnes
- Mother: Carmella Cammeniti
- Stepfather: Marco Silvani
- Grandfathers: Rocco Cammeniti; Richard Aaronow; Clifford Barnes
- Grandmothers: Lucia Cammeniti; Rebecca Napier; Pamela Barnes
- Uncles: Declan Napier; Will Griggs
- Aunts: Rosetta Cammeniti; Rosaria Cammeniti
- First cousins: Marco Yeats; India Napier
- Other relatives: Raimondo Cammeniti; Maria Cammeniti; Teresa Cammeniti; Sienna Cammeniti; Angelica Cammeniti; Sofia Cammeniti; Marcus Napier; Alan Napier

Chloe Cammeniti, played by Sarah May, is the daughter of Carmella Cammeniti (Natalie Blair) and Oliver Barnes (David Hoflin). She was born on-screen on 21 January 2008. Chloe is born premature and she initially suffers from breathing difficulties, but she eventually recovers. Following her birth, Oliver decides to fight for custody of his daughter. Chloe and her mother depart on 3 December 2008 to meet up with Oliver in Portugal. In September 2010, it was announced that Hoflin and Blair would be returning as Oliver and Carmella in March 2011. Chloe also returned with them, now played by Daisy Zanveld.

Chloe is born six weeks prematurely. On the circumstances of her birth, Blair said "Carmella needs an emergency caesarean and her baby daughter's having trouble breathing. The baby is whisked to intensive care before Carmella even has the chance to hold her." Blair added that Carmella is heartbroken and that she feels "desolate". Carmella blames herself for Chloe being born early and she decides to put her baby first before everything else.

Carmella discovers she is pregnant following the end of her relationship with Oliver. She worries that her addiction to prescribed anti-depressants has affected her baby, but she is told that the baby is fine. Carmella later begins a relationship with her business partner, Marco Silvani (Jesse Rosenfeld). Oliver worries that he is going to be cut out of his child's life. Carmella goes into premature labour and she agrees to have an epidural, despite attempting to have a drug-free birth. However, the baby becomes distressed and has to be delivered by cesarean section. Carmella gives birth to a daughter, but she is distressed to find out that the baby cannot breathe alone. She is then rushed to the neonatal unit. Carmella and Oliver decide to name their daughter, Chloe. Chloe spends a few days in the neonatal unit and she starts breathing on her own. Carmella is discharged, but Chloe has to stay in the hospital for a while longer. Carmella and Marco decide to move into Ramsay Street and Oliver grows concerned about Marco's place in his daughter's life. Oliver starts a fight with Marco during Chloe's Christening. Oliver then begins to fight for custody of Chloe. Marco dies after suffering injuries in a bushfire and Oliver drops the custody case. Oliver decides to leave for a new job and Carmella and Chloe join him a few months later. Chloe returns with her parents when they come back to Erinsborough to get her grandmother, Rebecca Napier (Jane Hall).

== Jodie Smith ==
Jodie Smith
- Neighbours character
- Portrayed by: Mary Annegeline
- Duration: 2008–2011
- First appearance: 23 January 2008
- Last appearance: 13 July 2011
- Introduced by: Ric Pellizzeri
In-universe information
- Occupation: Nurse
- Brothers: Braydon Smith

Jodie Smith, played by Mary Annegeline, made her first screen appearance on 23 January 2008. Annegeline went up for role of Jodie shortly after she had relocated to Melbourne, she said that she "nailed the audition". A few days later her agent called to tell her that she had won the part. Annegeline described Jodie as "quite the ball buster" who is very dedicated to her work. She is a strong woman and is not afraid to stand up for what she believes in.

When Karl Kennedy (Alan Fletcher) returns to work at Erinsborough Hospital, he is welcomed to the department by Jodie. As Karl gets to know his patients, Jodie warns him that the head of department is on the warpath. That same day, Jodie tells Carmella Cammeniti (Natalie Blair) that her newborn daughter, Chloe, is breathing on her own and that Carmella can go and hold her. Jodie and Karl work together to treat Richard Aaronow (Blair Venn), who is in the final stages of renal failure. A few months later, Ringo Brown (Sam Clark) was brought in after passing out and falling unconscious during a swim. Jodie helps work on him and gives his friends and family the news that he is going to be fine. Weeks later, Chris Knight (Luke Mitchell) is brought in, critically ill with a head injury. Bridget Parker (Eloise Mignon) lies to Jodie that she is Chris' cousin, so she can visit him. Jodie explains to her new colleague, Nicola West (Imogen Bailey) about Jay Duncan. Jodie is pleased to hear that Kirsten Gannon (Nikola Dubois) is being transferred to a burns unit in Perth and brings her the papers to sign. Jodie struggles to get on with Nicola as Nicola was the subject of hospital gossip. Nicola is confronted by Bridget who tells everyone that Nicola slept with her adoptive nephew and was in love with her brother-in-law. Jodie is amused and later refuses to share the staff's donuts with her. Jodie then began constantly piling work on Nicola. Karl give Jodie a warning when she comments that Nicola is flirting instead of working. As Karl continues to help Nicola, Jodie makes digs about their relationship.

Jodie attends a football game between the Eastside Dingoes and the Anson's Corner Bull Ants and clashes with Rebecca Napier (Jane Hall). As the game continues, Matt Freedman has to step in and separate them. Cassandra Freedman (Tottie Goldsmith) is given a job at the hospital and Jodie shows her the filing system and reminds her about patient confidentiality. Jodie tells Karl that she will have to report him after he resuscitates Harold Bishop (Ian Smith), after he finds out about the "Not For Resuscitation" order on Harold's file. When the Parker family are involved in a car accident in the bush and brought in, Jodie takes Bridget's daughter, India away to be examined. Libby runs into Doug Harris (Mahesh Jadu) and Jodie in the park and believes that they are out on a date together. Jodie helps treat Kate Ramsay (Ashleigh Brewer) for minor injuries after she is involved in a road accident with Stephanie Scully (Carla Bonner) and Ringo Brown (Sam Clark). Lyn Scully (Janet Andrewartha) asks her what is happening with Steph, but Jodie does not know. Following a fire at Number 26, Andrew Robinson (Jordan Patrick Smith and Michael (Sandy Winton) and Natasha Williams (Valentina Novakovic) are taken to the hospital, where Doug tells Jodie to take them to emergency. Jodie tries to get Summer Hoyland (Jordy Lucas) back into bed and she offers to stay with Natasha as Karl tells her that she will be anxious when she wakes up. Jodie later takes Michael to see his daughter. A few months later, Jodie helps out with Jim Dolan's (Scott Parmeter) treatment for cancer.

== Heather Pryor ==
Heather Pryor
- Neighbours character
- Portrayed by: Georgina Andrews
- First appearance: 19 February 2008
- Last appearance: 9 July 2008
- Introduced by: Ric Pellizzeri
In-universe information
- Occupation: Journalist

Heather Pryor, played by Georgina Andrews, made her first screen appearance during the episode broadcast on 19 February 2008. Andrews successfully auditioned for the role of Heather and she said that she liked the character straight away. Andrews describes Heather as "feisty" and says that her job and career are important to her. She said that Heather was not mean, but as a journalist she had to push to get her stories. Heather was dedicated to her job, but "surfing was her outlet". Andrews enjoyed playing Heather because she was unpredictable.

Shortly after arriving in Erinsborough, Heather's bags are stolen. She and her taxi driver, Frazer Yeats (Ben Lawson) give chase and Frazer manages to get her laptop back. Heather begins her new job and forms a friendship with Riley Parker (Sweeney Young). When Elle Robinson (Pippa Black) has to take time off of work, Heather and Riley grow even closer. Riley asks Heather to spend the night with him at his home. When they arrive they find that Riley's parents have made a bed up for Heather on the couch. Riley and Heather agreed to use her apartment in the future. Heather argues with Elle about a story on Stephanie Scully (Carla Bonner) and she tells Elle not to let her feeling about Riley get in the way. When Heather goes to interview Lou Carpenter (Tom Oliver) about a protest he was holding, she runs into Riley, who was becoming distant towards her. A week later, Heather and Riley take a trip to the beach and they find an abandoned bag. They realise that it belongs to Ringo Brown (Sam Clark) who had gone missing.

Heather asks Riley to move in with her and he accepts, but Heather is unaware that he wants to escape his adoptive aunt Nicola West (Imogen Bailey). Nicola meets up with the couple at Charlie's and she starts making suggestive comments to Riley. He goes home to pack, but Nicola walks in and they begin kissing. Heather arrives and catches them. She runs off and Riley chases after her. Heather slaps him and then tells him never to come near her again. Heather is sent to investigate the arsonist who set fire to the forest. Heather's boss Paul Robinson (Stefan Dennis) sends her to talk to Callum Jones (Morgan Baker) in a bid to flush out the real arsonist. Heather and her photographer are later sent to Erinsborough High to catch Rachel Kinski (Caitlin Stasey) and Angus Henderson (Jonathan Wood) attending a parent-teacher evening.

== Samantha Fitzgerald ==
Samantha Fitzgerald, played by Simone Buchanan, made her first on-screen appearance on 21 March 2008. Samantha was married to Daniel Fitzgerald (Brett Tucker). The Herald Sun describe Samantha as a "smart, successful lawyer".

== Ty Harper ==
Tyler Harper, played by singer Dean Geyer, made his first on-screen appearance on 27 March 2008. He was introduced to the show as the cousin of Taylah Jordan (Danielle Horvat) and as a potential romantic interest for Rachel Kinski (Caitlin Stasey). During 2008, Neighbours' underwent a major revamp and former Australian Idol contestant Dean Geyer joined the show as permanent cast member, Ty. Geyer worked with the Neighbours drama coach, Mike Bishop, for four months to help prepare for the role and took vocal lessons to help with his South African accent.

== Sienna Cammeniti ==
Sienna Cammeniti, played by Erin McNaught, was introduced as the cousin of the established Carmella Cammeniti (Natalie Blair). McNaught was cast in the role to help boost falling ratings in Australia. McNaught took acting classes in preparation for the role of Sienna and she began filming her first scenes on 17 December. She made her first on-screen appearance on 2 May 2008.

== Chris Knight ==
Chris Knight
- Neighbours character
- Portrayed by: Luke Mitchell
- First appearance: 14 April 2008
- Last appearance: 26 May 2008
- Introduced by: Ric Pellizzeri
In-universe information
- Occupation: Eastside Dingoes football player

Chris Knight, played by Luke Mitchell, made his first screen appearance on 14 April 2008. When he decided to pursue acting, Mitchell took the advice of an agent and moved interstate, where he landed the role of Chris on Neighbours. The part was Mitchell's first acting job. The character of Chris was described as a "bad boy". The show's then executive producer, Susan Bower, revealed in a 2010 interview that she thought the storyline between Bridget and Chris was brilliant. She said "[When] Bridget went out with Chris Knight, the older boy, and he tried to take advantage of her, and he was subsequently found dead – and the fallout from that – I thought that was brilliant".

Chris Knight joins the Eastside Dingoes senior football team after they run trials. As he introduces himself to everyone, he notices Bridget Parker (Eloise Mignon). He mentions to Declan Napier (James Sorensen) and Ringo Brown (Sam Clark) that he thinks Bridget would be hot if she made an effort. It is later revealed that Chris once dated Zeke Kinski's (Matthew Werkmeister) girlfriend, Taylah Jordan (Danielle Horvat). Chris causes further problems when he crashes Ringo's 18th birthday party and starts a fight. Bridget's brother, Riley Parker (Sweeney Young) accidentally hits Chris' dog, Larry. Chris takes Larry to the vets surgery where Steve Parker (Steve Bastoni) treats him. While Steve and the rest of the family go get something to eat, Bridget stays behind at the surgery. Chris arrives to find out the latest on Larry. Bridget allows Chris to see the dog and they start chatting. Chris apologises for his behaviour at Ringo’s party and invites her for a coffee. They begin to see each other regularly and Chris comes to visit Larry a lot.

Bridget asks Chris to go to the school formal with her and he accepts. Bridget keeps the news of her from her parents, but her aunt finds out and agrees to the secret. At the formal, Chris gives Bridget a necklace. Taylah notices Chris is there with Bridget and Zeke wants to do something about it, as Taylah had earlier revealed that Chris had forced her into a physical relationship that she did not want. Steve sees Chris and Bridget together and confronts Bridget about him. However, Bridget and Chris ignores them and leave the formal to go to a hotel. In the room, they start kissing, but Chris wants to get more serious and take it further. Bridget pushes him away and runs off. Bridget arrives home and claims that Chris had dumped her for being a kid. The next morning Ty Harper (Dean Geyer) and Libby Kennedy (Kym Valentine) are having a picnic in Lassiter's park. Ty throws a Frisbee into the bushes and Libby finds Chris lying there unconscious. He is taken to hospital with serious injuries and the police begin to question all the people at the formal. Bridget tells Steve that Chris chased after her and she pushed him away, not realising that he injured himself. Steve decides to take the fall for her. Bridget visits Chris in hospital and as she is talking to him, he wakes up and grabs her hand. Bridget struggles and Steve arrives and pulls Bridget free. He then warns Chris not to tell the police the truth. Chris' health deteriorates and he dies during surgery.

== Nicola West ==
Nicola West, played by Imogen Bailey, made her first on-screen appearance on 5 May 2008. The character was created as Miranda Parker's (Nikki Coghill) younger sister. Bailey won the role after her agent informed producers that she had been taking acting classes for a year. In December 2007, Bailey auditioned and impressed the casting team so much that she received the part two days later. She was signed to a six-month contract. Of her character Bailey said "She's a bit of a vixen, but is quite down to earth as well. When you first see her, she's trying to impress everybody – she's dressed up, her hair is done and there's a lot of make-up, but gradually she feels more comfortable in Ramsay Street and realises she doesn't have to do that, so the real her emerges."

== Jim Parker ==
Jim Parker
- Neighbours character
- Portrayed by: Roger Oakley
- First appearance: 8 May 2008
- Last appearance: 13 May 2008
- Introduced by: Ric Pellizzeri
In-universe information
- Occupation: Farmer
- Wife: Kitty Parker
- Sons: Stuart Parker; Ned Parker
- Adoptive sons: Steve Parker
- Grandsons: Riley Parker; Mickey Gannon
- Granddaughters: Bridget Parker
- Other relatives: India Napier

Jim Parker, played by Roger Oakley, is Stuart and Ned Parker's father. He is also the adoptive father of Steve. He made his first on-screen appearance on 8 May 2008. After visiting his father for a few weeks, Ned brings Jim back to Ramsay Street. During his stay, Jim tells Steve that he is not his real father. He departed on 13 May 2008.

Of Oakley's casting, Ruth Deller of television website Lowculture said "One of the nicest dad characters in soap, ever, has to be Tom Fletcher from Home and Away. And actor Roger Oakley arrives in Neighbours today as Jim Parker, Steve, Stu and Ned’s dad, who we’ve already established is a wrong’un – or at least he was when Steve was a kid, so that’s interesting casting".

Ned notices that Steve avoids talking about their father and when he questions him, Steve tells him that their father had been a violent drunk. He caught him with another woman one day and he was then locked in the garden shed, where he developed claustrophobia. Ned refuses to believe Steve and he takes his son, Mickey (Fletcher O'Leary) to visit his grandfather. Ned returns to Ramsay Street with Jim, leaving Steve shocked. Jim tells Miranda (Nikki Coghill) and Riley (Sweeney Young) that Steve does not remember the shed incident the same way as he does. Steve saw Jim with a neighbour who had found him after he had been drinking all night and he locked himself in the shed. Steve is annoyed when Miranda tries to get him to talk to his dad, but he is relieved that he is going on a fishing trip without him. Riley later invites Jim along. Jim starts drinking again and loses his temper with Lou Carpenter (Tom Oliver) when Lou finds that the fish Jim caught, came from a shop. Riley refuses to give Jim the keys to the car, and Jim tries to hit him. Steve intervenes, telling Jim to leave Riley alone. Jim then lets slip that Steve is not his son. Steve throws Jim's belongings out of the house and says that he now knows why he and Jim had never been close. Jim later tells Ned what happened. Steve finds Jim in Charlie's and they talk. Jim tells Steve that his real father was his best friend, Gary Fuller. He was killed in Vietnam and Jim tells Steve that he was responsible for his death. Jim found out that Gary had been having an affair with his wife, Kitty, and Jim left Gary to die after he was wounded.

Jim goes back to the bar the next day and Nicola West (Imogen Bailey) buys him a scotch, knowing that he had given up drinking. Once Jim was drunk, Nicola then calls Steve to collect him. Steve asks Jim if he told him the truth earlier and Jim admits that he lied. He explains that Gary was not the only one who had been hurt, another man had been injured too. Jim chose to help him instead, but he struggled with the guilt over leaving Gary. Jim patches things up with Steve and Ned and he returns to Oakey.

== Donna Freedman ==
Donna Freedman, played by Margot Robbie, made her first on-screen appearance on 2 June 2008. Robbie auditioned for the role of Donna in early 2008. The actress believed she had performed badly during the audition and decided to leave for a five-week holiday in Canada. Robbie had only been in Canada for two days when she received a phone call telling her that she had won the role of Donna. Donna arrives as an obsessed groupie of Ty Harper (Dean Geyer) and manages to force her way into the Ramsay Street teen group. Donna has no one to turn to and buries her love in the music scene and Ty, who is her focus for love and acceptance.

== Callum Rebecchi ==
Callum Rebecchi (also Jones), played by Morgan Baker, made his first on-screen appearance on 9 June 2008. The character of Callum was introduced to the show following the decision to stop a storyline, which would see Toadfish Rebecchi (Ryan Moloney) adopt a child from Indonesia illegally. Baker was cast in the role of Callum and he began filming his first scenes in March 2008. Moloney said that having the character of Callum around is "really cool" and Callum is described as being "a bit of a tearaway."

== Jay Duncan ==
Jay Duncan
- Neighbours character
- Portrayed by: Charlie Clausen
- First appearance: 13 June 2008
- Last appearance: 18 July 2008
- Introduced by: Ric Pellizzeri and Susan Bower
In-universe information
- Occupation: Fireman

Jay Duncan, played by Charlie Clausen, made his first screen appearance on 13 June 2008. Jay was a Fireman who dated Stephanie Scully. He started a fire in the bush, which claimed the life of Marco Silvani.

When Stephanie Scully (Carla Bonner) first meets Jay, there is chemistry between them. When Jay asks her out, Libby Kennedy (Kym Valentine) pushes her into accepting. Steph is hesitant about going out with Jay as she is still feeling guilty about her failed relationship with Toadfish Rebecchi (Ryan Moloney). Of Jay, Carla Bonner said "Jay's a bit more rugged than Toadie, but while Toadie's not your classic beefcake, that hasn't put Steph off in the past". She also described him as "brooding" and said that Steph "may not be able to count on Jay, who could be hiding a secret or two". Following a bush fire, Jay takes Steph and her son, Charlie (Jacob Brito) hostage in a cabin. Steph finally realises that Jay started the fire and is a "psychopath". Steph finds newspapers reports, in which Jay is hailed a hero after rescuing blonde, single mothers from a series of fire incidents. Jay reveals his darker side and he raises his voice at Steph. Bonner told TV Week, "It really shocks her – this is a side of him she hasn't seen. It dawns on her then, she quickly takes a step back and thinks, 'Oh gosh! What have I done coming here? I'm in big trouble!'". Toadie knows Steph is in danger from Jay and races to the cabin. Bonner added "Steph realises just how dangerous Jay is, and she ends up getting stabbed!"

Ty Harper (Dean Geyer) is due to perform at a charity gig for the Erinsborough fire service, but the venue is cancelled. He tells Jay that the gig can be held at Charlie's. Jay asks Steph out on a date, but she says no. After talking to Libby, Steph changes her mind and agrees to go out for dinner. She does not return Jay's calls, but he turns up at Charlie's and asks her out again. Jay and Steph's relationship then starts to get serious. Steve Parker (Steve Bastoni) has to perform community service with the fire service and ends up working with Jay. Jay gets the residents of Ramsay Street involved in a clear up of the forest. During the clear up a bushfire begins. Marco Silvani (Jesse Rosenfeld) later dies of injuries sustained in the fire and Kirsten Gannon (Nikola Dubois) is seriously ill. It is revealed that the fire had been lit deliberately. An investigation begins and Jay finds a lighter in Callum Jones's (Morgan Baker) coat pocket. Jay speaks to Callum, who denies starting the fire. Toadie is angry with Jay for accusing Callum. Jay sets fire to Callum's shed and suggests to Toadie that he should take Callum to a fire awareness group. Toadie suspects Jay is the firebug and he confides in Nicola West (Imogen Bailey), who agrees to help find evidence on Jay. Nicola finds news articles which show Jay being the hero in other fires, that all involve blonde single mothers. Toadie insinuates to Jay that he knows he is the firebug and Jay suggests that he, Steph and Charlie go away for a few days.

Steph and Jay arrive at a cabin and Steph finds the newspaper articles about Jay in her bag. Steph reads them and confronts Jay. He insists he has nothing to hide. Jay later goes through her bag and takes her keys. Steph notices where Jay has hidden the car keys and she sneaks out, but finds the car's brakes have been cut. Steph calls Toadie and hides the phone once it is connected. Jay hears Toadie shouting down the line and ends the call. Steph lets Charlie leave the cabin on his own in the hope that Toadie finds him. Steph threatens Jay with a poker and he gives her the key to the door. Steph runs out, but Jay grabs her and she falls, knocking herself out. When she wakes, Jay is standing over her with a lighter. Toadie bursts in and tries to wrestle Jay to the ground, but Jay escapes. Steph and Toadie return home and she asks if he can stay the night. Jay returns to Ramsay Street too and breaks in, but runs off after Callum spots him. Jay turns up again with a pair of scissors. During a fight, Steph is stabbed and Jay tries to get away. Toadie and Daniel Fitzgerald (Brett Tucker) catch him. Jay is attacked whilst in remand and taken to the hospital. Carmella Cammeniti (Natalie Blair) enters Jay's room and he shows remorse for Marco's death. Carmella leaves the room, while Jay cries.

== Lucas Fitzgerald ==
Lucas Fitzgerald, played by Scott Major, made his first on-screen appearance on 22 July 2008. This is Major's second appearance in Neighbours, having previously held the role of Darren Stark in 1993. Major had just returned to Australia, after being overseas for a few years, when he received a call to play Lucas. Lucas is the brother of Daniel Fitzgerald (Brett Tucker) and he is described as being a bit of a "bad boy" who is always the life of the party.

== Kelly Katsis ==
Kelly Katsis
- Neighbours character
- Portrayed by: Katrina Milosevic
- Duration: 2008–2009
- First appearance: 25 August 2008
- Last appearance: 6 February 2009
- Introduced by: Susan Bower
In-universe information
- Occupation: Teacher

Kelly Katsis, played by Katrina Milosevic, made her first appearance on 25 August 2008. Milosevic said she was "chuffed" and "really, really excited" to be joining the cast of Neighbours. Milosevic's father died during her first week on set and she said her co-stars, Ryan Moloney and Morgan Baker were "so supportive". She added "Working on Neighbours was exactly what I needed at that time. I've been so grateful for it". Milosevic departed in February 2009. She said she was sad to be leaving Neighbours and that she had enjoyed working with Moloney and Baker. Milosevic describes Kelly as a "real nurturer". She is strong, sensitive, funny and witty. Milosevic added "She’d be your best friend or your worst enemy. She knows her own mind. I've really enjoyed playing her. She really has the ability to explore lots of avenues because her core is so strong, and you could put her in a lot of different situations. She’s a bit fiery and at the same time she is very soft". Network Ten said Kelly was "a breath of fresh air" for Toadfish Rebecchi (Moloney) and that she changed his "life for the better".

When Callum Jones (Baker) is caught showing photos of Nicola West (Imogen Bailey) at school, Kelly arranges a meeting with his guardian, Toadie. Toadie became nervous and asked housemate Daniel Fitzgerald (Brett Tucker) to join them. Toadie agrees to talk with Callum and Kelly leaves thinking that Toadie and Dan are a couple. She asks Dan if they might be interested in giving a talk about same-sex parenting at the school. Kelly hears that Callum has been fighting with Mickey Gannon (Fletcher O'Leary) and she visits Toadie again. She explains that Callum's behaviour at school means that she is going to report the situation to Human Services. Toadie thinks that he cannot cope with the situation and gets in touch with Callum's aunt. Kelly arrives with Human Services to help Callum pack and he is taken away. Toadie's ex, Stephanie Scully (Carla Bonner) turns on Kelly, but she replies that it was probably difficult for Steph to see Toadie since he came out. Kelly hears that Dan is planning to move in with Libby Kennedy (Kym Valentine), she tells him off for treating Toadie so badly. Callum returns to Ramsay Street and Kelly and Toadie throw him a party. Kelly introduces Toadie to a friend, hoping to match make them. Rebecca Napier (Jane Hall) tells Kelly that Toadie is straight and Kelly is humiliated. Toadie later asks her out to dinner and she agrees. Kelly is delighted when Toadie asks her to be his date at Libby and Dan's engagement party. At the end of the night, Kelly and Toadie share a kiss and go back to his place. Kelly offers Callum her laptop to write his book report on, but she later realises that he had gone through her files and found some modelling photos. Callum emails the photos to Paul Robinson (Stefan Dennis) for his newspaper. Toadie tries to stop Paul from publishing the photos, but he fails. Kelly then tells Toadie that she has been suspended from her job. Kelly is reinstated in her job after a protest organised by Callum, but her relationship with Toadie came to an end.

Kelly thinks that Callum might have to stay back a year. After some tests, Kelly concludes that he is not dyslexic, but may need his eyes tested. Kelly offers to help Callum and Toadie with the Ramsay Street best Christmas lights display. The following week, Toadie asks Kelly to join her for a pizza and they get back together. Following Zeke Kinski's (Matthew Werkmeister) disappearance, Kelly looks at a newspaper article about him and starts having visions of him. Elle Robinson (Pippa Black) notices how shaken Kelly is and Kelly tells her that both her mum and her gran had "the gift" as well. Kelly saw how upset Karl Kennedy (Alan Fletcher) was and Elle convinces her to give him a little hope. Kelly goes to his house and as she touches Zeke's backpack, her visions return. She tries to explain them to Karl, but he throws her out of the house. Toadie turns on Kelly and she tells him that she had hoped her boyfriend would be more accepting. Toadie refuses to listen to any of her explanations. Kelly points out that she had been trying to help Karl, not torture him. Toadie realises that he made a mistake. Kelly asks him to meet her and she tells him that she has taken a job in Malawi. Kelly tells Toadie that she will be back one day and they share one last kiss.

== Andrew Simpson ==
Andrew Simpson
- Neighbours character
- Portrayed by: Peter Flanigan
- Duration: 2008–2009
- First appearance: 5 September 2008
- Last appearance: 7 April 2009
- Introduced by: Susan Bower
In-universe information
- Occupation: Teacher; Principal of Erinsborough High

Andrew Simpson, played by Peter Flanigan, is a teacher who became principal at Erinsborough High in 2007. He made his first screen appearance on 5 September 2008. Former Gillette model, Peter Flannigan returned to Australia from America and was persuaded by a friend to get back into acting. Flannigan said "I decided to give it another shot and I got the role as Andrew Simpson on Neighbours". He added that he enjoyed his time on the show and loved the location shooting and the people. Andrew Simpson is described as "tall, dark and extremely handsome". He is ambitious and has an attraction to Libby Kennedy (Kym Valentine). Andrew begins a relationship with Rebecca Napier (Jane Hall). He sweeps her off her feet and Rebecca seems pleased to be with him instead of Paul Robinson (Stefan Dennis). Much to Andrews' horror, Rebecca sticks up for Paul after Cassandra Freedman (Tottie Goldsmith) accuses him of harassing her. It makes Andrew realise that Rebecca is still harbouring feelings for Paul and when he asks her if she loves him, Rebecca cannot say yes. Andrew is heartbroken and he decides to leave Erinsborough.

Erinsborough High School promote Andrew to the position of principal in September 2007. Andrew shows that he is willing to give second chances and when Ringo Brown (Sam Clark) steals an exam paper, his older brother Frazer Yeats (Ben Lawson), convinces Andrew to give him a one-week suspension. Andrew is part of the interview panel when Daniel Fitzgerald (Brett Tucker) and Libby Kennedy (Kym Valentine) apply to become head of senior school. Dan gives a strong interview, but Libby arrives late and leaves her notes at home. When Dan is given the job, he steps down and leaves it to Andrew to offer Libby the job instead. Andrew is invited to Libby and Dan's engagement party and he meets Elle Robinson (Pippa Black). He offers her a lift home and they share a kiss in the General Store. Elle pulls away, apologising for leading him on. A pregnant Bridget Parker (Eloise Mignon) pushes over Justin Hunter (Chris Toohey) and Andrew decides to expel her. Andrew claims that it is a new school policy to have zero tolerance on violence. Miranda Parker (Nikki Coghill) tips a bin over his head. Bridget's story then appears on the front page of the newspaper and Andrew asks for an article of his own. Susan Kennedy (Jackie Woodburne) is forced to write it and Libby mentions that Andrew has made up the new policy. A protest begins at the school and Andrew tries to sort things out. Rebecca Napier handcuffs herself to the banisters and Andrew ends up attached to the other end. He agrees to speak to Bridget and Rebecca removes the handcuffs.

Andrew turns up at Charlie's bar wearing his Army Reserves uniform and is mistaken for a stripper. Rebecca tells him that he is far too uptight to do anything like that and begins undoing his shirt. She thanks him for being a good sport and she suggests that he should call her. They arrange a date, which goes well. They then begin a relationship. Rebecca's ex, Paul, becomes jealous and starts plotting to keep the couple apart. Paul keeps Andrew talking during a meeting, and he is late to meet Rebecca. Paul goes to her house with food and drink. In the morning, Andrew arrives with flowers to apologise and finds Paul leaving Rebecca. Andrew realises that he has been set up, but he makes up with Rebecca. Andrew takes Dan's place in a rafting trip. Andrew announces a competition between the two rafts, but it ends in disaster as one of the rafts capsizes, leaving Bridget, Libby and Zeke Kinski (Matthew Werkmeister) missing. Libby and Bridget are found soon after and Paul takes the opportunity to print an article blaming Andrew for the whole situation. Andrew starts to distance himself from Rebecca and Paul continues his plan to ruin Andrew. He digs up a story about a fellow soldier dying in an accident when Andrew was in the Army. Paul then blackmails Rebecca into ending her relationship with Andrew. A few weeks later, Andrew meets Rebecca and his feelings for her come back. Cassandra Freedman gets in touch with him and talks him into speaking to Rebecca. Andrew goes to Ramsay Street with flowers and he tells her that he is not giving up. After a romantic meal, Rebecca is stunned when Andrew proposes. She accepts and Andrew asks her to move in with him, but she is reluctant to give him an answer. When Andrew overhears Rebecca defending Paul, he becomes concerned. He asks her if she still loves Paul. Rebecca removes her engagement ring and hands it back to Andrew. He leaves and decides to take a transfer to a different school.

== Matt Freedman ==
Matt Freedman
- Neighbours character
- Portrayed by: Benjamin Mitchell
- First appearance: 9 September 2008
- Last appearance: 23 September 2008
- Introduced by: Susan Bower
In-universe information
- Occupation: Police Sergeant
- Wife: Cassandra Freedman
- Sons: Simon Freedman
- Daughters: Tegan Freedman
- Stepdaughters: Donna Freedman

Matt Freedman, played by Benjamin Mitchell, made his first appearance on 9 September 2008. The character and Mitchell's casting was confirmed by Tiffany Lamb in the 28 June – 4 July 2008 issue of TV Week. The character of Matt marks Mitchell's fourth stint with Neighbours. He previously had a cameo in 1989, originated the role of Brad Willis that same year, before joining the main cast as Cameron Hudson from 1992 until 1993. Neighbours casting director Jan Russ had cast Mitchell in his previous roles, and decided to cast him in the role of Matt. Russ did not think his casting was going to confuse long-time viewers. Matt was introduced as a police officer and the father of Donna Freedman (Margot Robbie). The role gave Mitchell the chance to play a father for the first time. He stated: "Most of the characters I've played have been the 'good-guy' type and with Matt I had a wonderful opportunity to explore a slightly darker edge". Mitchell said he had "great fun" playing Matt and the producers told him that they had "a view to bring Matt back" in the future.

When Elle Robinson (Pippa Black) and Susan Kennedy (Jackie Woodburne) are kidnapped by Pete Ferguson (Kristin Holland), Paul Robinson (Stefan Dennis) goes to the hospital to get Pete's address. Unfortunately Paul, along with an unwilling Rebecca Napier (Jane Hall), break into an office and are caught by Jodie Smith (Mary Annegeline), who contacts the police. Sergeant Matt Freedman arrives and is ready to arrest the pair, but Rebecca explains the situation and after a few hours, Pete is caught. A few days later, Matt is almost forced to arrest Rebecca again after she brawls with Jodie at a football game. He spots his daughter Donna Freedman (Margot Robbie) in the crowd and she runs off. Matt catches up with her at Charlie's bar and pulls her off of her boyfriend Ringo Brown (Sam Clark). Matt talks to Rebecca and explains that Donna got her looks and her temperament from her mother. Donna steals Matt's keys and takes Ringo for a joyride in his police car. They stop and climb into the back seat, but their night is interrupted by Matt who tracks them down. He pulls Ringo out of the side and forces him to walk home in his underwear. Donna is embarrassed and she goes to see Ringo to apologise. She explains that her father treats her badly because she reminds him of his ex-wife, who cheated on him. As they talk, Matt arrives and takes Donna home, telling her not to see Ringo again.

The next day, Donna cannot get Matt to talk to her, so she steals his car again. Donna hits something and she finds a dog lying in the road. She calls Ringo and they take the car to Lucas Fitzgerald (Scott Major). It emerges that Donna had also hit the dog's owner, Nicola West (Imogen Bailey) and she has to admit everything to Matt. He immediately tells Donna and Ringo to keep quiet, before smashing the car's headlight and threatening Lucas. He tells him not to say anything, as he is going to swap the new headlight with evidence from the accident scene. Elle works out what is going on and makes Donna see that she has to own up. Matt catches Donna, Ringo and lawyer Toadfish Rebecchi (Ryan Moloney) at the station and convinces Toadie that Donna is just looking for attention. Donna is grateful to receive some attention from her father, but when she spots him threatening Ringo, she tells the police everything. Detective Alec Skinner (Kevin Summers) arrests Matt. Matt's lawyer gets him released on bail the next day and he goes home to talk to Donna. He explains that he is in a lot of trouble and that prison is not the best place for a cop to be. He tells her that she is going to have to learn to cope without him. Matt leaves town and in a note, asks Donna to cover for him for a few days.

== Simone Page ==
Simone Page
- Neighbours character
- Portrayed by: Laura Hill
- Duration: 2008–2010
- First appearance: 19 September 2008
- Last appearance: 25 August 2010
- Introduced by: Susan Bower
In-universe information
- Occupation: Police constable

Simone Page, played by Laura Hill, made her first screen appearance on 19 September 2008. Simone is a Police Constable at Erinsborough Police Station.

After she accidentally runs over Nicola West (Imogen Bailey), Donna Freedman (Margot Robbie) struggles to know what to do. She goes to the police station, where Constable Page tells her to take a seat and somebody would come along to speak to her. Weeks later, Declan Napier (James Sorensen) is pulled over by Simone after he runs a stop sign. He refuses to tell her his name and he is taken to the station and placed in a cell. The following year, Simone arrives at the Lassiter's complex when Amanda Smith (Lauren Bailey) claims that her baby daughter has been snatched. Steve Parker (Steve Bastoni) fears that his wife, Miranda (Nikki Coghill), has snatched the child and leaves the police to go find her. Miranda is found in the General Store and she explains that she had found that child alone in its pram and had gone to find the mother. Simone arrests her and places her in protective custody under Section Ten of the Mental Health Act. Simone is called to the scene when Ringo Brown (Sam Clark) is involved in a car accident with his new football teammates. Senior player, Adam Clarke (Clint Bizzell) was driving and he forces Ringo to take the blame. Simone is in little mood to cooperate as Ringo hopes that his status will get him off with a caution.

Simone is called out to Bridget Parker's (Eloise Mignon) protest at the hospital. When one of the police officer tries to move Bridget's baby, Bridget lashes out and pushes the officer to the ground. Simone then arrests her for assault. She is taken to the police station, where she protests that she has a newborn baby to look after, but Simone points out that she should have thought about that first. Only a few weeks later, Bridget dies following a car crash and Johnno Brewer (Damien Aylward) is taken in for questioning. Simone tells Bridget's husband, Declan that, she had really liked her and did not enjoy seeing the person responsible for her death walk free. Johnno is later convicted of killing Bridget. Simone meets Donna again after Donna is hit by Saffron Jankievicz (Shanyn Asmar) during a confrontation. Donna is talked into contacting the police and pressing charges. Simone arrives to take a statement and promises Donna that she would follow it all up. She then tells her that she has done the right thing by reporting Saffron. Not long after, Simone comes back to Ramsay Street when Harry Ramsay (Will Moore) goes missing from his foster home. Simone suspects that he is back with his family and does her best to track him down. She is hindered by the Ramsay Street residents who attempt to distract her from her work. Callum Jones (Morgan Baker) offers her doughnuts, while Harry moves houses. Harry is found and Lou Carpenter (Tom Oliver) is warned that his chances of guardianship were now slim. When Susan Kennedy (Jackie Woodburne) receives threats and is followed by a car, Simone takes down some details, but tells Susan and her family that there is not much the police can do. Donna is forced to ride in the back of Lucas' truck on the day of her wedding and they are pulled over by the police. Simone arrives and tells the other constable that she heard what had happened and that she knows the people involved. Simone gives Donna and her father a lift to the ceremony.

== Kyle Canning ==
Kyle Canning, played by Chris Milligan, made his first on screen appearance on 26 November 2008. Milligan successfully auditioned for the six-week recurring role of Kyle and he was later asked back every couple of months to do a few weeks filming. Kyle was initially portrayed as an immature "bad boy", whose physical presence made him fall into the role of a bully. However, his low academic intelligence made him vulnerable to people smarter than himself. A traumatic accident and his struggle to secure employment changed Kyle's ways. The character has been described as a larrikin, good hearted and laid back. Milligan was later promoted to the regular cast and given a full-time contract deal.

== Greg Michaels ==
Greg Michaels
- Neighbours character
- Portrayed by: Nick Farnell
- Duration: 2008–2009
- First appearance: 11 December 2008
- Last appearance: 22 May 2009
- Introduced by: Ric Pellizzeri
In-universe information
- Occupation: Salesman
- Wife: Veronica Olenski

Greg Michaels, played by Nick Farnell, made his first appearance on 11 December 2008. He was introduced as a love interest for Stephanie Scully (Carla Bonner). Jackie Brygel of TV Week said Steph's courage at posting on a dating website paid off when she met "tall, soft-spoken" Greg. Following a successful first date, Steph thinks she has found "the man of her dreams" and they continue their romance in the new year. Bonner explained "She hooks up with him and it feels great for Steph, especially as she's been so lonely. She has strong chemistry with Greg, and things are fantastic between them at first." However, Greg is married to someone Steph knows and she is devastated when the truth emerges. Bonner said Greg is "very persistent and there are lots of confrontations ahead. Things will get very interesting because the two of them have developed a real bond. It's difficult because there are serious feelings involved, but the last thing Steph wants to be is a home wrecker, and hopefully the viewers will realise that." A critic for the Daily Record questioned Greg's character, writing "So, is Greg a nice guy or just a creep? The jury's still out. After all, he didn't tell Steph he was married when they met but redeemed himself slightly by helping to save Charlie's life and dumping his wife Veronica for his girlfriend."

Stephanie Scully decides to submit a profile to an internet dating site and she puts up a photo of herself all done up. She receives a lot of offers and decides to go along to her first date in her usual clothes. Her date, Greg, is happy to see her, but Steph believes that he was hoping for the girl in the photo. Steph is shocked when Greg explains that they had met before at TAFE. She suddenly remembers him and tells him how all the girls liked him. Greg admits that he was interested in Steph back then but could not pluck up the courage to ask her out. Greg takes Steph home and they kiss. When he leaves, he puts his wedding ring back on. Greg and Steph meet up for another date and they go to Lassiter's hotel and have sex. Steph feels cheap, but Greg insists that he is serious about their relationship. Steph leaves after she learns that Libby Kennedy (Kym Valentine) has been taken to hospital. While she is at the hospital, Steph sees Greg hugging Veronica Olenski (Caroline Lloyd). Steph later invites Greg to the hotel room and confronts him, where he tells her that he is married to Veronica. Steph says she wants nothing more to do with him. Greg explains that his marriage has been over for months and that he has left Veronica.

Steph and Greg attempt to patch things up at Steph workplace. Her son is involved in an accident and Veronica treats him at the hospital. Steph and Greg go outside and kiss, but they are caught by Veronica. Veroninca freezes her and Greg's bank account and is forced to spend the night on Steph's sofa. Veronica realises Greg has chosen Steph and she apologises for freezing their bank account. She then begs him to come back to her, but he turns her down. Greg tells Steph that he has been offered a job in Darwin. Needing the money, Greg is keen to accept and asks Steph to join him. However, she tells him that she belongs in Erinsborough, so they agree to keep the relationship going. A few months later, Greg returns and tells Steph that he wants them to have children together. Greg grows jealous when he finds out that Steph dated Toadfish Rebecchi (Ryan Moloney) and that Toadie had written a play about their relationship. Greg asks Steph if she is still in love with Toadie, which she denies. Toadie changes the end of the play and Steph's character begs Toadie's character to take her back. Greg contacts a lawyer and has Toadie sued for defamation. Steph cancels the lawsuit. Greg turns his jealousy towards Lucas Fitzgerald (Scott Major). During a barbecue, Lucas picks Steph up and threatens to throw her in the pool. Greg shouts at him and accuses Steph of being cheap. He apologises, but admits that he finds it hard to see her with other guys. They talk things through, but Steph realises that she is happy to be herself and does not need to change. Greg then packs his things up and leaves.

== Simon Freedman ==
Simon Freedman
- Neighbours character
- Portrayed by: Mauricio Merino, Jr.
- Duration: 2008–2009
- First appearance: 12 December 2008
- Last appearance: 3 April 2009
- Introduced by: Susan Bower
In-universe information
- Occupation: Student
- Father: Matt Freedman
- Mother: Cassandra Freedman
- Sisters: Tegan Freedman
- Half-sisters: Donna Freedman

Simon Freedman, played by Mauricio Merino Jr, made his first screen appearance on 12 December 2008. Earlier that year, teen magazine, Dolly, held a competition for a chance to win a three-month contract with Neighbours. Merino and Chelsea Jones were picked from thousands of entries to star as Donna Freedman's (Margot Robbie) younger siblings. They were both introduced at the end of the year. It was announced that the siblings would be "Donna's worst nightmare" and they were described as being "cheeky" and "pesky". Robbie said she was looking forward to the arrival of Donna's siblings and developing her character further with their introductions. Merino described his character as "a very mysterious and quiet young boy, who's been through a lot in his young teen years". Simon is protective of his sisters, especially Donna. Simon escapes his problems by listening to his iPod. He finds it hard to trust other people.

Simon and Tegan arrive in Erinsborough and go to Harold's Store, but when Tegan is rude to Elle Robinson (Pippa Black), they are thrown out. Simon is embarrassed by his sister's behaviour. They go to Elle's house later that day and explain that they are Donna's siblings. Donna was away on a school trip, but Simon and Tegan insist that they told Donna they were coming. Elle allows them to stay with her. When Donna returns, she is angry to find her brother and sister there. Donna tries to reconnect with Simon and Tegan, but Simon gets frustrated with the situation and asks Tegan why they were there. Donna takes them to a party across the street and Simon struggles to fit in. He decides to leave, but Donna's boyfriend Ringo Brown (Sam Clark) catches him and threatens him. Donna sees them fighting and is upset when she realises Simon is going. Simon confronts her about why their parents split up and claims that Donna told their dad about their mum's affairs. Ringo splits up with Donna, but Simon explains to him that he is the first guy Donna was changing for. Ringo then goes to see Donna and they get back together.

Donna, Simon and Tegan's mother, Cassandra (Tottie Goldsmith) arrives and Simon and Tegan move in with her. Simon tries to defend his mum when Donna says that she only came to town to get Paul Robinson (Stefan Dennis). However, he realises that Donna is right and Tegan had been keeping her mum updated on the people of Erinsborough. Simon tries to stop Paul from going on a date with Cassandra and he super glues the doors shut, cuts the phone lines, and throws Paul's mobile phone battery over a fence. Simon gets a screwdriver glued to his hand and Paul helps him. They talk and Simon admits that he did not want his mother being walked all over by another man. Paul respects Simon and tells him that they are similar. Simon stands up for Tegan when she gets teased by Kyle Canning (Chris Milligan). Simon encourages Tegan to stand up to their mother. Simon steals an iPod from Harold's Store and he is forced to hand it to Paul. Simon tells him that wanted some attention. When Cassandra starts behaving badly again, Simon and Tegan realise that they have to get away from her. Simon decides that the best place they can go to was their nan's. Elle finds them at the bus stop and she takes them back to say goodbye to Donna, before driving them to their nan's.

== Tegan Freedman ==
Tegan Freedman
- Neighbours character
- Portrayed by: Chelsea Jones
- Duration: 2008–2009
- First appearance: 12 December 2008
- Last appearance: 3 April 2009
- Introduced by: Susan Bower
In-universe information
- Occupation: Student
- Father: Matt Freedman
- Mother: Cassandra Freedman
- Brothers: Simon Freedman
- Half-sisters: Donna Freedman

Tegan Freedman, played by Chelsea Jones, made her first appearance on 12 December 2008. Earlier that year, teen magazine, Dolly, held a competition for a chance to win a three-month contract with Neighbours. Merino and Chelsea Jones were picked from thousands of entries to star as Donna Freedman's (Margot Robbie) younger siblings. They were both introduced at the end of the year. It was announced that the siblings would be "Donna's worst nightmare" and they were described as being "cheeky" and "pesky". Robbie said she was looking forward to the arrival of Donna's siblings and developing her character further with their introductions.

Simon and Tegan arrive in Erinsborough and go to Harold's Store where Tegan is rude to Elle Robinson (Pippa Black). Elle throws them out, but they turn up on her doorstep later that day. They explain that they are Donna's siblings. Donna was away on a school trip, but Simon and Tegan insist that they told Donna they were coming and Elle allows them to stay with her. When Donna returns, she is angry to find her brother and sister there, but tries to reconnect with them. Tegan tells Simon that they have to say in Ramsay Street as their mum had sent them. Tegan then tells Donna that their mother, Cassandra (Tottie Goldsmith), has a new boyfriend and they had to get away because there was no lock on the bathroom door. Donna hugs her sister and introduces her to her boyfriend Ringo Brown (Sam Clark). She takes the siblings to a party being thrown for Callum Jones (Morgan Baker). Callum tells Tegan that he has amblyopia, leading her to believe that it is a life-threatening illness. She is embarrassed when she finds out that it means Callum has a lazy eye. Simon tries to leave, but Tegan reminds him that they have to be there. When Donna and Ringo split up, a jealous Tegan speaks to both of them and encourages them to move on. Simon goes to see Ringo and he and Donna get back together, which annoys Tegan. Feeling like she is not wanted by Donna, Tegan lashes out. Donna stages a pretend chat show, so the siblings can get to know each other better.

Cassandra arrives and Simon and Tegan move in with her. Tegan admits that their mother is only in Ramsay Street to get Paul Robinson (Stefan Dennis). Tegan helps Cassandra steal some dresses from Harold's Store, so she can get an invite to Libby Kennedy (Kym Valentine) and Daniel Fitzgerald's (Brett Tucker) wedding. Tegan provides a distraction and Cassandra takes the dresses from the back of the store. Cassandra shortens Tegan's school uniform, telling her it would attract attention from the boys. However, it gets her bullied by Kyle Canning (Chris Milligan). Tegan throws her uniform in the bin, but Cassandra shortens Tegan's new uniform. Tegan stands up to Kyle, before turning on her mother. Tegan turns to Bridget Parker (Eloise Mignon) for advice and Cassandra is shocked to see Tegan wearing jeans and a T-shirt. When Cassandra starts behaving badly again, trying to get revenge on Rebecca Napier (Jane Hall). Cassandra tries to get Tegan to pick up an alcoholic drink from the bar, so she can sue Rebecca for serving a minor. Tegan has second thoughts about getting involved and the siblings realise that they have to get away from her. Simon decides that they can go to their nan's and Elle finds them at the bus stop. She takes them back to say goodbye to Donna, before driving them to their nan's.

== Others ==
Date(s)	Character	Actor	Circumstances
18 January–26 March	Evelyn Wallace	Felicity Soper	Evelyn is Jessica Wallace's mother. Ringo Brown gives her a message from Jessica, following her death in a warehouse collapse. Evelyn wants justice for her daughter and demands an apology from the council.
13 February	Lynda Stephens	Nicola Wright	Lynda has an affair with Darren Stark, which leads to the break up of his relationship with Libby Kennedy. Libby returns to Shepparton to get her belongings and Lynda apologises to her and accepts the blame for the affair. She tells Libby that Darren loves her, but he feels second best to Drew.
20 March – 16 April 2009	Michaela Morris	Jacqueline Brennan	Michaela Morris is a Detective Sergeant with the Erinsborough Police Station. In her first appearance, she questions Rachel Kinski about her relationship with her teacher. When Rachel refuses to talk, Michaela points out that she is making things worse. She arrests Marco Silvani for assault when he punches Oliver Barnes and Riley Parker for the same charge when he confronts a man from his past. Michaela investigates the national park bushfire and holds a press conference outside the station, asking the journalists to back off. In 2009, she questions Declan Napier, Callum Jones and Mickey Gannon over a bag of money Declan finds in the community gardens. Michaela arrests and questions Paul Robinson over the mysterious death of Jill Ramsay. After a fire breaks out at Paul's home, Michaela speaks to Kate Ramsay, but is forced to stop by Toadfish Rebecchi.
13 May	Yasmine Murphy	Therese Mavros	Yasmine was a receptionist at Lassiter's Hotel. Yasmine got hold of a security tape that featured Paul Robinson and Kirsten Gannon kissing. She then blackmailed Paul and Kirsten. Paul offered her money and a transfer to another hotel. Yasmine gave then gave them the tape.
9 June	Hilda Jones	Maureen Edwards	Hilda worked as a cleaner at Charlie's bar, where she met Stephanie Scully. Steph offers to introduce her great-grandson, Callum Jones, to Toadfish Rebecchi, so he can have a male influence around. When Toadie takes Callum home, they find Hilda collapsed in the garden. They are told that she needs months to recover. Hilda is the grandmother of Sonya and Jade Mitchell. In 2011, Jade receives a call from her aunt, Robyn Lovell, telling her that Hilda has died.
9 June–8 July	Franco Silvani	Gary Down	Marco Silvani's father. Franco is unhappy about Marco dating Carmella Cammeniti and running the General Store. Franco believed that he may have been responsible for Marco's infertility, after Marco contracted mumps when he was younger. Franco and Marco later made up. Following Marco's death, Franco struggles to give a speech at his funeral.
17 June–10 September	Pete Ferguson	Kristin Holland	Pete Ferguson is a criminal who comes to get revenge on Steve Parker, who had fought his friend Nick in prison. Pete comes to Ramsay Street to threaten Steve's family. Pete breaks into Steve's surgery and ends up in hospital. Nicola West withholds his pain medication until he admits to the crime. Pete turns on Nicola's and she suffers a needlestick injury. Pete is informed that he is HIV positive and he realises that tests have been done without his permission. Pete announces that he is going to sue the hospital, before going to the Erinsborough News to share his story. Pete kidnaps Elle Robinson and Susan Kennedy, but he is later caught and arrested.
11 July–1 August	Kate Newton	Briony Behets	Harold Bishop meets Kate while he is travelling around Australia. Kate later comes to Ramsay Street to visit Harold. Harold invites Kate to come with him on the next part of his journey and they leave together.
27 August 2008	Fred & Big Tommo	Hamish & Andy	Fred & Big Tommo are radio presenters, who agree to interview Donna Freedman and Rachel Kinski. Donna blurts out that Rachel is having relationship problems with Ty Harper and Fred & Big Tommo agree to play a song by Ty's band on the air.
2 September–3 October	Logan Ellis	Nick Cain	A member of Nothing Doing, the band which Ty Harper is part of. He invites Sienna Cammeniti to join as lead singer and he falls for her. He later decides to go to Italy with her.
12 September	Braydon Smith	Ming Yang	Braydon is Jodie Smith's younger brother. He plays football for the Anson Corner Bull Ants against the Eastside Dingoes. He knocks Zeke Kinski down and Rebecca Napier calls him a thug.
13–17 October	Robyn Lovell	Patricia Pitney	Robyn is Callum Jones' aunt. Callum goes to live with her after Toadfish Rebecchi thinks he cannot cope. Toadie realises that he has made a mistake and goes to Robyn's farm to see Callum. Robyn tells him that Callum is happy there, but she later brings him back to Ramsay Street.
13 October	Hayden Lovell	Justin Golin	Hayden is Robyn Lovell's son, who feeds some goats with Callum Jones.
14 October – 7 April 2009	Nathan Black	Lyall Brooks	Nathan is an AFL talent scout. He is also father to Ashley Black. Nathan offers Ringo Brown and Declan Napier a chance to train with the Carlton Blues. He give them both places, but Declan drops out. Ashley accuses Ringo of pursuing her and Nathan is angry, until Ashley admits it is a lie. Nathan later throws Ringo off the team.
13 November–24 November	Tanya Tasker	Erin Dewar	Tanya is a music agent, who Rachel Kinski invites to Charlie's bar to come and see Ty Harper play. Tanya is impressed by Ty and asks him to join one of her bands, who had just lost its lead singer. Ty takes up Tanya's offer, but neglects to tell her that he is battling a painkiller problem. Tanya tells Rachel that she is not welcome on Ty's journey and she starts flirting with him. Ty turns her down and she warns him that he had just made a big mistake. She calls him the next day to tell him that he is no longer needed.
26 November – 26 January 2009	Shane Gregory	Ryan Bate	One of the boys that hung around with Justin Hunter, Kyle Canning and later Zeke Kinski. Following the school rafting trip disaster, Zeke's stepfather Karl Kennedy mistakes Shane for Zeke when he sees him in the Lassiter's Complex.
12 December – 23 February 2012, 13 February 2018	Roz Challis	Janet Watson Kruse	Roz is a Social Worker with the DHS. She visits Toadfish Rebecchi after his application to become guardian to Callum Jones reaches its final stages and she agrees that Callum can stay with Toadie. Roz returns to Ramsay Street to visit the Ramsay family and she tells them that she will refer their case to the Children's Court. When Harry is suspended, Roz takes him into foster care. Lou Carpenter applies to become guardian of the family and his application is successful. Roz returns on Kate's eighteenth birthday to tell her she can be the family's guardian. A couple of years later, Roz learns Sophie Ramsay has been expelled from school and that Kate has left. She explains that Kate has seven days to return or Sophie will be placed in foster care. Kate returns in time for the meeting and Roz is informed that Kate and Sophie no longer want to live together. Paul puts in an application to become Sophie's guardian and Roz reveals that it has been granted. Six years later, Roz is now a judge and she presides over Tyler Brennan's murder trial. After Tyler pleads guilty, she dismisses the jury and later sentences Tyler to 20 years in jail, with a non-parole period of ten years.
