= Nicola West =

Fictional television character

- Neighbours character
- Portrayed by: Imogen Bailey
- First appearance: 5 May 2008
- Last appearance: 8 October 2008
- Introduced by: Ric Pellizzeri
In-universe information
- Occupation: Nurse
- Mother: Yvonne West
- Sisters: Miranda Parker
- Nephews: Riley Parker (adoptive)
- Nieces: Bridget Parker (adoptive)
- Other relatives: India Napier (adoptive)

Nicola West is a fictional character from the Australian soap opera Neighbours, played by Imogen Bailey. She made her on-screen debut on 5 May 2008 and departed the show on 8 October 2008. Nicola was introduced as the young sister of established character Miranda Parker (Nikki Coghill). The character has been central to many storylines including an HIV scare, incest and mental illness. The character has been well received by viewers and critics; however, her casting was criticised by Brisbane acting agency Ego Management chief, Mark Eaton, due to Bailey being a model. The incest storyline was also criticised.

== Creation and casting ==
Nicola was created as the young sister of established character Miranda Parker (Nikki Coghill). Model turned actress Imogen Bailey was asked by producers to portray her. Bailey got the part after her agent informed producers that she had been taking acting classes for one year prior. In December 2007 Bailey auditioned and impressed the casting team so much that she received the part two days later. She was signed to a six-month contract. Around the time fellow model Erin McNaught and singer Dean Geyer were also cast as Sienna Cammeniti and Ty Harper respectively. The castings angered the acting industry, who accused Neighbours of hiring celebrities to boost ratings. Of this, Brisbane acting agency Ego Management chief, Mark Eaton, commented that credible actors were missing out on job opportunities, adding: "This is all done to try to get viewing figures up – the producers are not worried about the quality of the show at all." Executive producer Susan Bower defended the castings stating the actors were doing extremely well. Bailey began filming her role on 21 January 2008.

== Development ==
=== Characterisation ===
Nicola's persona is complex, she has been shown to be manipulative, usually with good intentions. Of this Bailey described her during an interview with the Herald Sun stating: "She's a bit of a vixen, but is quite down to earth as well. When you first see her, she's trying to impress everybody – she's dressed up, her hair is done and there's a lot of make-up, But gradually she feels more comfortable in Ramsay St and realises she doesn't have to do that, so the real her emerges." Defending her 'man eating' ways she added: "She does have a bit of sexual prowess but also has a very big heart and she's not coming from a really bad place. She's just looking for love. She has her femme-fatale moments, but she's a femme fatale with a really big heart and when the doors are closed she's not as sure of herself as she'd like people to think she is." According to Bailey, Nicola's best qualities are the fact she is a sexy siren and a big trouble-maker.

When you first see Nicola, Bailey states: "If we were judging Nicola on first appearances I would say the word 'Vixen' describes her best". She also defended the first impressions of the character stating: "She is actually quite a multi-layered character and this made her really interesting to play. She has a lot of emotional baggage from her childhood, she seeks constant validation from men and is a pretty insecure and messed up woman at her core." Of her sisterly image she states: "She plays the smiley happy-go-lucky sister and she causes lots of trouble in the street but what it all comes down to, for Nicola, is her deep need to find love. I guess in a way we all have this need but Nicola's quest for love really does rule her life and causes her to make some wacky decisions..." Of her overall changes Bailey states: "She went through many highs and lows in the six months that I played her and the end of her first chapter was pretty heavy, playing her emotional breakdown was exhausting and challenging but I loved every minute of it."

=== Incest ===
Shortly after the character's introduction, it emerges that she has been involved in a romantic relationship with her young nephew Riley Parker (Sweeney Young), whom Miranda and Steve Parker (Steve Bastoni) adopted along with Bridget Parker (Eloise Mignon). Scenes between the pair establish that Nicola does not want to end the relationship and intends to keep it a secret from the rest of their family. Bailey told Jackie Brygel of TV Week that it was "a very big secret that Nicola's bringing along in her suitcase. It's very controversial." She pointed out that Nicola and Riley were not blood related, which made the affair "slightly less outrageous", but not something she personally endorsed. Bailey found the plot "tricky to play", but thought that it was great that the serial was taking some risks with its storylines. Bailey thought that Nicola and Riley's relationship had been going on for some time, explaining "It's definitely a shameful secret and Nicola's afraid of how her sister would react if she found out. She feels guilty that she's betrayed her sister, but she's still desperate for Miranda's approval – her judgement is something to be feared to Nicola."

Bailey was also fearful of how viewers would react to the storyline, especially when she was out in public. She joked that she did not want people to throw tomatoes at her, but at the same time she was excited knowing Nicola was bringing "a bit of extra baggage" to a street that has been fairly quiet. Bailey described Nicola as having "a femme fatale" side to personality, but underneath that she has a big heart and is looking for love, but she has been looking in the wrong places. She also called Nicola "a very emotional person." Brygel reckoned Nicola had every right to fear Miranda's wrath should her affair with Riley be discovered. Bailey hinted that the relationship would be revealed, commenting that there was "a storm brewing".

The controversial storyline was soon picked up by the media, after Australian conservative groups voiced their disapproval of it. The media likened the plot to the real life case of Austrian man Josef Fritzl, who raped his daughter. The Australian Family Association accused Neighbours of using plots mirroring real life events to attract viewers, branding them "opportunistic". The president of its Queensland branch commented on the storyline adding: "Is Neighbours redefining itself as some kind of sick mockumentary? Incest is a very sensitive subject that I wouldn't expect a prime-time program aimed at children to be tackling. They are dealing with young minds who can't fully understand or analyse the issues." Susan Bower defended the storyline stating: "It is controversial, but all our stories are handled carefully."

=== HIV scare ===
The character becomes involved with Pete Ferguson's (Kristin Holland) plot to target her brother-in-law Steve Parker when he is admitted to the hospital. However, the plot soon develops into an issue-based storyline for Nicola, as she is shown receiving a needlestick injury and going through a HIV scare. After Pete is placed in Nicola's care, she takes the opportunity to get revenge on him and prove herself to her family, after recently admitting she is in love with Steve. Bailey explained: "There's been a break-in at Steve's vet surgery, and Nicola's sure it was Pete. She's always looking for ways to score points with the family. As well as still being in love with Steve, she's also fiercely loyal to her sister, Miranda – as strange as that sounds. She's the sort of person who would jump in and do anything to protect both of them. Nicola really wants to show Steve and Miranda that, even with all the problems they've had, she's still a member of the family and she'll do anything to protect them."

Bailey defended her character's behaviour, saying that she was not a bad person, but a little bit mixed up. She described Nicola's "emotional problems" as having many layers and thought it was "important to have characters like that, and to show why they make these crazy decisions." However, she conceded that Nicola goes too far in a bid to see justice served upon Pete. She explained that she tries to manipulate Pete to get the right reaction, but when he does not take the bait, she withholds pain medication. This results in "a scuffle" in which Nicola is stabbed with a needle. Pete then refuses to take a blood test, so "a desperate" Nicola carries out an unauthorised screening. Bailey said that Nicola does not feel that she has anyone to turn to for support because of her estrangement from her family. When the blood test shows that Pete is HIV positive, Bailey said that Nicola's emotions are racing, adding "She immediately thinks, 'I'm going to get sick – I might die!' Nicola's priority in life is to find love and she's thinking, 'Nobody is ever going to want me, nobody is ever going to marry me now'. That's a huge tragedy for her – she wants a husband and children, like Miranda." Nicola is forced to go through "an agonising wait" to learn if she has contracted HIV.

=== Breakdown and departure ===
Nicola is the victim of a hit-and-run incident when she is run over by Donna Freedman (Margot Robbie), and Donna's father Matt Freedman (Benjamin Mitchell) tries to frame Lucas Fitzgerald (Scott Major) for the crime. Nicola uses her recovery to her advantage as she fakes amnesia in order to get "a fresh start" with her family and regain Miranda's love. Bailey explained that when Nicola comes out of her coma, it appears she has amnesia, but Bridget and Steve are "wary" of her, while Miranda feels guilty and remains by her bedside. Bailey told Jackie Brygel of TV Week that when Steve realises that Nicola is faking the amnesia, he is "gunning to get her out of the street", which makes Nicola "extremely paranoid" that Miranda will also discover the truth. Nicola decides to "get rid" of Steve by poisoning him, so he cannot continue to interfere. Bailey described her character as being at her "lowest ebb", continuing: "From the moment Nicola first arrived in Ramsay Street, she's been on this downward spiral. Now, she's really at breaking point and is making decisions she normally wouldn't." Brygel noted that Nicola seemed like she wanted to do the right thing, even though she often failed to do so, which Bailey agreed with. She said that things have been building up for Nicola and it just took one big event to trigger a breakdown. She reckoned her character had "snapped" and her mental state had deteriorated to the point that she has lost touch with reality. Bailey added that Nicola had a special friendship with Toadfish Rebecchi (Ryan Moloney), but even he cannot bring her out of it.

The storyline led to the departure of the character. After learning that Nicola is responsible for Steve's poisoning, Miranda confronts her sister, which pushes her "over the edge." Nicola decides to flee town, but stops to visit Steve at the hospital, where she declares her love for him. While Steve's condition takes a sudden turn for the worse, the police catch up to Nicola and arrest her.

== Storylines ==
When Nicola first arrives in Erinsborough, it emerges that she and Riley had a relationship. When Riley tries to end it, he can not resist. They then decide to keep seeing each other secretly, despite the fact that she is his adoptive aunt and that Riley is dating Heather Pryor (Georgina Andrews). Heather discovers their affair, ending her romance with him and he and Nicola keep their affair a secret, even though Riley had been reluctant to the idea. She admits to having feelings for her brother-in-law Steve Parker (Steve Bastoni) before he and Miranda got married. Nicola later reveals she was only born so her parents could save Miranda's life when she was suffering from cancer, using her cells to treat Miranda's illness.

After Bridget finds them kissing in Riley's car, Riley decides to leave for the Middle East to be a war correspondent – against his family's will. He leaves a goodbye note urging his family not to trust Nicola. After Nicola kisses Steve and tells Miranda, Bridget tells Miranda of Nicola and Riley's affair, Miranda throws Nicola out of her home. Nicola reveals that Miranda used to be in love with another man, subsequently splitting them up. Nicola becomes good friends with Toadfish Rebecchi (Ryan Moloney) and Callum Jones (Morgan Baker) and moves in with them for a while.

Nicola suffers a needle injury from Pete Ferguson (Kristin Holland), resulting in an HIV scare. She illegally takes a blood sample under Dr. Karl Kennedy's name. Pete tests HIV positive but Nicola's result returns negative. While out walking her dog, Nicola is struck by a car driven by Donna Freedman (Margot Robbie). She is in a coma as a result and when she regains consciousness, she has amnesia, although Bridget suspects she is pretending, as does Steve. It slowly becomes apparent she is pretending to make amends with Miranda, who finds out and kicks her out of the house.

Nicola poisons Steve, who as a result ends up in hospital. Miranda confronts Nicola, and Nicola knocks Miranda to the ground. Nicola is taken away by police. Nicola is sectioned and proved to be suffering from mental illness, believing she is Miranda and that Steve is her husband and Bridget is her daughter.

== Reception ==
Nicola was well received by UK viewers and during a trip to the UK, Bailey stated that she was overwhelmed by support for her character. Upon Nicola's introduction, Jackie Brygel from TV Week observed "Not since Natalie Bassingthwaighte played Izzy has a blonde shaken things up like Imogen Bailey's character, Nicola!"

The plot involving Nicola poisoning Steve was named "Most Ridiculous Storyline" of 2008 by readers of TV Week. Story producer Lara Radulovich stated: "Ok, so the dodgy lasagne will be filed under 'it seemed like a good idea at the time.' But Imogen Bailey's portrayal of a scorned woman losing control of her mind and her family had me glued to the television... And I knew what was going to happen!"

In 2009, Ruth Deller of entertainment website Lowculture praised Bailey's portrayal of Nicola, citing her as the reason her on-screen family became interesting, she said "Imogen Bailey has done a great job at playing slutty-and-bonkers-aunt Nicola over the past year. She wasn't exactly Izzy, but she made the Parker family interesting, although the sudden sending her into a basket case storyline hasn’t been as interesting as when she was bitchy but loveable a few months ago."

John Burfitt of TV Soap named Nicola one of Neighbours' "greatest bitches". He said "This blonde bombshell tore up Erinsborough a couple of years ago, seducing her nephew, ruining her sister's marriage and wrecking careers." During a feature on the serial's villains, Burfitt's colleague Dominique Tillman branded the character "deranged" and wrote "The longer she spent in town, the more villainous Nicola West became." Tillman pointed out how Nicola "got the ball rolling on her wicked campaign" by seducing Riley, before trying to seduce Steve and faking amnesia in order to "wheedle her way back" into Miranda's life.
