= Steve Parker (Neighbours) =

Australia soap opera character

- Neighbours character
- Portrayed by: Steve Bastoni
- Duration: 2007–2009
- First appearance: 23 July 2007
- Last appearance: 24 July 2009
- Introduced by: Ric Pellizzeri
In-universe information
- Occupation: Veterinarian
- Father: Gary Fuller
- Mother: Kitty Parker
- Adoptive father: Jim Parker
- Half-brothers: Stuart Parker; Ned Parker
- Wife: Miranda Parker
- Adoptive sons: Riley Parker
- Adoptive daughters: Bridget Parker
- Granddaughters: India Napier
- Nephews: Mickey Gannon

Steve Parker is a fictional character from the Australian soap opera Neighbours, played by Steve Bastoni. In 2007, Neighbours decided to return to focusing more on family dynamics and the characters of Steve and his family were created and introduced to help boost falling ratings in Australia. Steve made his first on-screen appearance on 23 July 2007 along with his wife, Miranda Parker, and their daughter Bridget Parker. The family moved into Ramsay Street and Steve opened a veterinary practice in the Lassiters complex. His storylines included taking the blame for the death of Chris Knight, being kissed and poisoned by Nicola West, breaking up and later reuniting with Miranda, becoming a grandfather and the death of his daughter. In March 2009, the decision was taken to write the Parker family out of the show after Bastoni and Eloise Mignon quit. Steve departed on 24 July 2009 with his wife, following Bridget's funeral.

== Casting ==
In 2007 Neighbours suffered one of its worst decline in ratings, so producers implemented several key changes, including the introduction of a new family. Network Ten drama executive Dan Bennett said the show would return to the focus on relationships and family dynamics. The arrival of the Parker family in July 2007 marked the start of the show's renovation.

Actor Steve Bastoni was cast in the role of patriarch Steve Parker. Bastoni's agent contacted him and asked if he would consider joining the cast of Neighbours. He agreed to the role after struggling to find work following his move to Melbourne from Sydney with no prospects. Bastoni called the role "a little gift from God". He previously appeared in the serial as bank teller Alex Baxter in 1985. Bastoni admitted to feeling surprised by the pace of filming, saying "I was very shocked at how fast they shoot it all, and I wasn't prepared for the speed and volume of what you churn through every week." This contributed to the actor "mellowing out" following his arrival in Melbourne for the role.

On 18 February 2009, a reporter for The Daily Telegraph confirmed that Bastoni would be leaving Neighbours in April, after the producers decided to write the Parker family out of the show. Darren Rowe of Digital Spy later reported that the decision to write the family out came after Bastoni and Mignon decided to quit the serial. Of his exit, Bastoni said "I only planned to be on the show for a year to 18 months but I've been here two years now and have done enough – and there's nowhere else for the character to go."

== Storylines ==
Steve moves to Erinsborough from Sydney with his wife Miranda Parker (Nikki Coghill), and their two adoptive children Riley Parker (Sweeney Young) and Bridget Parker (Eloise Mignon), as Steve plans to open a new veterinary clinic. The family come to Ramsay Street to visit Steve's brother Ned Parker (Daniel O'Connor). Steve discovers the apartment the family are moving into is already furnished and Janae Timmins (Eliza Taylor-Cotter) allows them to store their things in her garage. Shortly after opening his clinic, Steve and Miranda are forced to move in Ned and Janae when their apartment floods. Steve is surprised when Riley turns up and tells him that he has dropped out of university. Ned and Janae both depart Erinsborough and the house is put up for sale by auction. Tim Collins (Ben Anderson) tells the Parkers that he plans to buy the house to build flats on and Steve tells him that he also plans to buy the house. At the auction, Steve outbids Tim, but goes over his limit. Miranda then tells Steve that they will have to cut costs.

When Chris Knight (Luke Mitchell) is found with head injuries, Bridget confesses to Steve that she pushed him away when he tried to attack her. Chris later dies and, to protect his daughter, Steve confesses to attacking Chris. Steve is arrested and charged with murder. During his trial, Bridget runs in and tells the court the truth. Miranda's sister Nicola West (Imogen Bailey) arrives and she lets slip that Miranda was in love with another man when she got married. Steve is shocked and moves out, believing that Miranda does not love him. Nicola then tries to seduce Steve and she later poisons him. Steve recovers and Nicola is sent to a psychiatric hospital. Steve and Miranda continue having marital problems and Steve is unhappy when he discovers that Miranda slept with a former boyfriend. However, the couple later reconcile.

Steve is angry when he discovers that Bridget is pregnant. However, he later comes round to the idea and promises to help her through it. Steve is also unhappy when Bridget's boyfriend, Declan Napier (James Sorensen) moves in with the family. Bridget gives birth to Steve's first grandchild, India, at a music festival. Steve and Miranda are able to listen to the birth via Karl Kennedy's (Alan Fletcher) phone.

While on their way to take India to visit relatives in Oakey, Steve swerves the car to avoid an escaped horse and the car overturns. Steve is relatively unharmed and when the rescue services arrive, he helps out with the search for Bridget. Steve finds her and India and they are taken to the hospital. Bridget later dies from internal injuries, which devastates Steve and Miranda. Following her funeral, Steve and Miranda decide to move away.

== Reception ==
The Parker's entrance to the show was watched by an average 1.05 million viewers in Australia. Network Ten's head of drama Dan Bennett praised the new cast members saying "It's probably the strongest cast we've ever had". AnnMaree Bellman of The Sydney Morning Herald liked the family's entrance, writing that "they engage right off". She also thought that Steve and Miranda were played "confidently" by Bastoni and Coghill.

The character was branded a "troubled family man" by a reporter for The Daily Telegraph. While reviewing an episode featuring the character's marital problems, Farah Farouque of The Age observed "The week's end finds family man Steve Parker (Steve Bastoni) an utterly spent force as he boxes in the gym. This is method acting at its finest, frustration is etched on his face and we also learn that he is fresh from having wrested his wedding ring off his finger in an apparently futile bid to crack onto a younger woman."

Steve has received mostly positive criticism from Ruth Deller of television website Lowculture. During his first year on the show, Deller said that Steve was "trying to fill the nice guy role of Philip Martin, but doesn't quite achieve it". In 2008, Deller said that the Parker family were improving and she singled Steve out, calling him "great". In July 2009, he was placed joint fifth with Coronation Street's Kevin Webster on the best soap characters list in 2009. Deller said "Both characters have been underrated 'good guys' for much of their tenure on the shows and deserve some credit for that. That's not the main reason they've made this month's chart though – it's because lots of people on the forums seem to have owned up to fancying these guys this month – and in a poor month for storylines and characterisation, being a DILF is qualification enough to get you into our top five."
