= Ty Harper =

- Neighbours character
- Portrayed by: Dean Geyer
- Duration: 2008–2009
- First appearance: 27 March 2008
- Last appearance: 30 April 2009
- Introduced by: Susan Bower
In-universe information
- Occupation: Law student Musician; Barman; Gym assistant Builder
- Uncles: Brad Jordan
- First cousins: Taylah Jordan

Ty Harper is a fictional character from the Australian soap opera Neighbours, played by singer Dean Geyer. He made his first screen appearance during the episode broadcast on 27 March 2008. He was introduced to the show as the cousin of Taylah Jordan (Danielle Horvat) and as a potential love interest for Rachel Kinski (Caitlin Stasey). He departed on 30 April 2009.

== Casting ==
Former Australian Idol contestant Dean Geyer's casting was confirmed in the 27 October – 2 November 2007 issue of TV Week by Pete Timbs. Timbs reported that he would be joining the main cast and that the length of his contract was still being negotiated, but he would be playing musician Ty who meets the younger characters and becomes integrated into Ramsay Street. His casting was part of a major revamp for 2008. Producers also recruited models Imogen Bailey (Nicola West) and Erin McNaught (Sienna Cammeniti) in a bid to "sex up" the cast.

Geyer had to undertake a screen test with Caitlin Stasey who plays Rachel Kinski to secure the role. He also worked with the Neighbours drama coach, Mike Bishop, for four months to help prepare for the role and took vocal lessons to help with his South African accent. On joining Neighbours, Geyer said that it was "definitely a stepping stone." Commenting on his first day on set Geyer stated: "The first day was pretty nerve-racking, but I was doing a performance with the band and that's something I'm obviously very familiar with."

Geyer quit the role of Ty in November 2008, so he could pursue his music career. He also admitted that he had struggled with some of the sexier storylines involving his character. Geyer, who is a Christian, said "In some instances my personal beliefs maybe were contradicting with what the character was doing". However, he also added that the storylines had no influence over his decision to leave the show. Geyer filmed his final scenes in December 2008.

== Development ==
Whilst interviewed by TV Week Geyer described Ty stating: "He's a singer. Ty was doing law at uni, but decided to drop out because music is so close to his heart. He wants to be a rock star. He's the cousin of one of the regular characters." Speaking of possible romances he added: "The first girl he meets is Rachel. There may be a bit of chemistry there, but we'll have to see. Ty may set his sights on an older woman." The Daily Telegraph said "Ty is a university drop-out with musical aspirations."

Network Ten describe Ty as being "charismatic, talented and impossibly handsome." His cousin, Taylah, tries to set him and Rachel up, but they do not get on well at first and when Rachel tries to initiate a conversation with him, she is "thwarted at every turn." Ten added "now that he has landed himself a job behind the bar at Charlie's it can only be a matter of time before he's an integral part of the Erinsborough community."

== Storylines ==
Ty is first seen at an all-ages music gig attended by his cousin Taylah and her friends. Ty speaks to Rachel at the bar, commenting on the poor service before getting on stage to perform with his band. Taylah decides to play cupid and bring Rachel and Ty together, but Rachel rejects every move that she makes. Ty is unhappy to see Donna Freedman (Margot Robbie) at Charlie's as she had been following him for a while. Ty explains to Rachel that Donna is an obsessive fan and Rachel helps him to get Donna to back off. Ty is later offered a job by Stephanie Scully (Carla Bonner), after he is caught sleeping behind the bar. He explains that he does not have a job or anywhere to live and he is invited to move in with her and Libby Kennedy (Kym Valentine). Ty develops a crush on Libby and they almost share a kiss, but Libby tells Ty that it would be wrong to pursue a relationship when he liked Rachel. At the Erinsborough High school formal, Ty allows Rachel to sing a song that he wrote, called "Unforgettable". Although Ty develops feelings for Rachel he does not act on them due to Rachel's on-going love for Angus Henderson (Jonathan Wood). After Angus leaves Rachel for a job in South Australia, Ty gives her an electric keyboard to make her feel better. Rachel thinks the keyboard is from Angus and decides that she does not want it. Ty explains that he is the one who brought it for her and Rachel is angry that Ty is buying her gifts so soon after Angus left. Ty apologises for upsetting her and tells her that the only reason he wants her to be happy is that he cares about her.

One night while Rachel is babysitting Ben Fitzgerald (Blake O'Leary) and Charlie Hoyland (Jacob Brito), someone sends her text messages and turns off the power. Armed with a cricket bat, Rachel hits the stalker when they come into the house. When the lights come back on Rachel sees that she has attacked Ty who was coming home. Rachel accuses Ty of being the stalker and he is taken to the hospital to get checked over. Ty questions how anyone thought that he could do that to Rachel and he asks her how she does not know how he feels about her. Rachel discovers that a classmate is responsible for stalking her and she apologises to Ty. He does not accept the apology and tells Rachel that he is hurt. Rachel invites Ty to a mystery gig at Charlie's and when he turns up, they kiss. They then begin a relationship. When Rachel's brother, Zeke (Matthew Werkmeister), goes missing following a rafting accident, Rachel turns to Ty for support. Rachel receives a scholarship to a school in London and she nearly declines as she could stay with Ty. Zeke encourages Ty to break up with her, which he does. However, he realises his mistake and races to the airport to say goodbye to Rachel properly. Ty misses Rachel and almost gives up his music career, but he is eventually talked out of selling his guitar. When he receives a text from Rachel meant for her cousin, Ty jumps to the conclusion that she is seeing someone else. However, Libby tells him that he is being silly and that he should tell Rachel how he feels. Ty is invited to join Rachel in London and the younger Ramsay Street residents have a small party for Ty. They sing to him as he leaves the street.

== Reception ==
For his portrayal of Ty, Geyer was nominated for the Logie Award for Most Popular New Male Talent at the Logie Awards in 2009. In the same year, he won the "Fave Aussie Hottie" accolade from the Nickelodeon Australian Kids' Choice Awards, and received a nomination for "King of Teen" from the Dolly Teen Choice Awards. Geyer also came third in the "Hottest Guy" category in the 2008 TV Week readers poll. He commented "Wow, I want to give a big thanks to all the people who voted and think that highly of my face!"

The decision to add Geyer to the Neighbours cast, along with McNaught and Bailey, outraged the acting industry, with some agents accusing the show of "sacrificing quality in favour of ratings".

While reviewing an episode in which the character is injured in a brawl between teenagers Ringo and Declan, Mike Bradley of The Observer quipped that Ty "has been strangely relegated from adult to adolescent". When Ty was deciding whether to get a different job, Farah Farouque of The Age observed that the character was "full of woes as he contemplates abandoning his boyish ambitions of making music for the man's work of digging Erinsborough's ditches."

After viewing Ty's final episodes, a Daily Record critic wrote "If you're into eye candy, it doesn't come much better than Ty Harper. There's no denying he's a good looking, kind-hearted lad. When he first arrived in Erinsborough, he was an aspiring musician who swept Rachel Kinski off her feet. Since she left to continue her studies in London, Ty has been moping around like a lost puppy." The critic also noted that "he was in a worse mood than ever" after Rachel seemingly ignored his video message.
