= Miranda Parker =

- Neighbours character
- Portrayed by: Nikki Coghill
- Duration: 2007–2009
- First appearance: 23 July 2007
- Last appearance: 24 July 2009
- Introduced by: Ric Pellizzeri
In-universe information
- Occupation: Real Estate agent; Events organiser; Veterinary clinic assistant; School janitor; Lassiter's Hotel employee
- Mother: Yvonne West
- Sisters: Nicola West
- Husband: Steve Parker
- Adoptive sons: Riley Parker
- Adoptive daughters: Bridget Parker
- Granddaughters: India Napier
- Nephews: Mickey Gannon (in-law)

Miranda Parker is a fictional character from the Australian soap opera Neighbours, played by Nikki Coghill. In 2007, the show's focus returned to focus more on family dynamics and the characters of Miranda and her family were created and introduced to help boost falling ratings in Australia. Miranda made her first screen appearance on 23 July 2007, along with her husband, Steve Parker (Steve Bastoni) and her daughter Bridget (Eloise Mignon). The family moved into Ramsay Street and Miranda became friends with many of her neighbours and was employed at both Erinsborough High and Lassiter's Hotel. Her storylines included the arrival of her sister Nicola (Imogen Bailey), breaking up and later reuniting with Steve, having an affair with her old university lecturer, becoming a grandmother and the death of her daughter. In March 2009, the decision was taken to write the Parker family out of the show after Mignon and Bastoni quit. Miranda departed on 24 July 2009 with her husband, following their daughter's funeral.

== Creation and casting ==
In 2007 Neighbours suffered one of its worst decline in ratings and several key changes took place to boost the ratings. Network Ten drama executive Dan Bennett revealed that the show would return to its focus on relationships and family dynamics. Writers created and introduced a new family, the Parkers, who already had a link to Ramsay Street in the form of Ned Parker (Daniel O'Connor). The family made their first on-screen appearance in July 2007, marking the start of the show's renovation.

Australian drama actress, Nikki Coghill was cast as the matriarch of the family, Miranda, and Steve Bastoni was cast as her husband Steve Parker. Eloise Mignon and Sweeney Young were cast as their children, Bridget and Riley. Shortly after she joined Neighbours Coghill believed that she was going to get the sack after she broke her ankle. She said "I thought, "That's it, I won't be able to work now and I'll be fired". However, the Neighbours bosses gave her a month off work and wrote her broken ankle into the script. Miranda was then said to have broken her ankle riding a mechanical bull.

== Development ==
=== Characterisation ===
Network Ten describe Miranda as the "latest in a long line of strong suburban women". She has enormous talent as an event organiser, but she is a "multi-tasking perfectionist". Miranda tries to keep her emotions under control, but she feels left out when Bridget and Steve bond over animals and sports. Network Ten also add that Miranda has a "keen sense of community". Last Broadcast describe Miranda as being a "dynamic supermum". She has a successful career and a happy marriage with two adopted children. However, she has been described as being a perfectionist, high-achieving and controlling. Five's Holy Soap website describe Miranda as a "feisty lady" who often clashed with her daughter. During an interview, Coghill said that she can identify with Miranda, "Like her, I'm a mum with two kids, and sometimes I have to struggle and juggle to make our lives together as a family work".

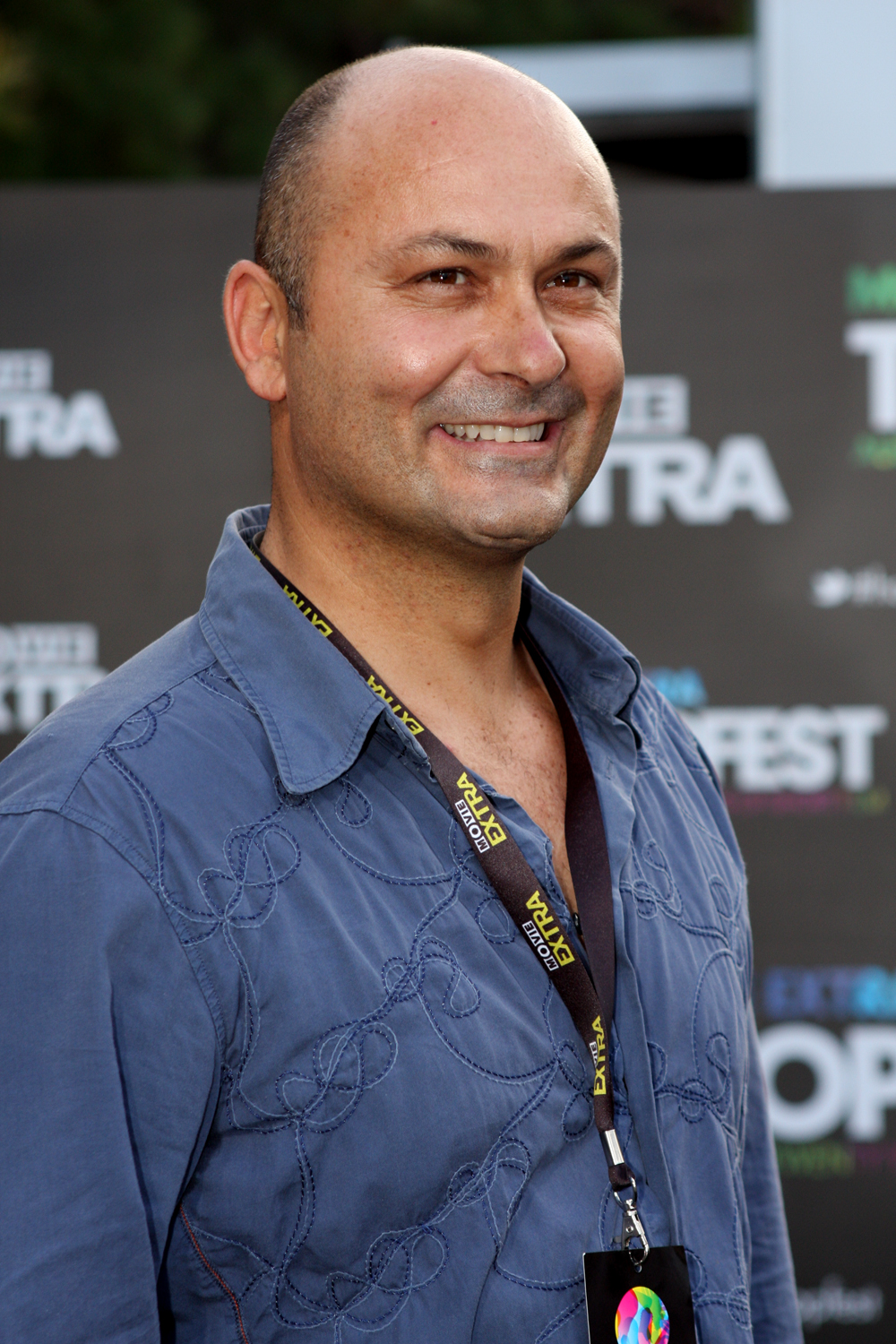
Actor Steve Bastoni (pictured) played Miranda's husband Steve Parker.

When Miranda's sister, Nicola West (Imogen Bailey) arrives in Ramsay Street, it becomes apparent that there is conflict between the sisters, which appears when Nicola begins to throw her money around. All of her money comes from their rich mother and Miranda opted to live without her financial support. Bailey said during an interview that Nicola is "very envious of Miranda's life and family".

=== Marital problems ===
Steve and Miranda's marriage suffers due to Nicola, who admits that she loves Steve and that she had sex with their son Riley. Coghill told Jackie Brygel of TV Week that her character is "devastated" by the revelations, saying "Imagine how hurt you'd be if your sister kissed your husband and had an affair with your son. It's really too much!" Nicola tells Miranda that she kissed Steve during the bushfire, and Coghill said that Miranda wants to believe that Nicola initiated the kiss, but she has doubts. She decides to believe Steve's version of the story and hopes her marriage can survive. Coghill told Brygel that when Miranda discovers Nicola had sex with Riley, it is "the ultimate betrayal" and she asks her to leave her home and her life. Coghill said things go from bad to worse with revelations from her character's fictional backstory. Nicola tells Steve about "a past love of Miranda's", which leads him to believe that she did not love him when they got married, so he walks out on her. Coghill admitted that Miranda was in love with another man before Steve, explaining "strong, dependable Steve was good marriage material, whereas the affair was explosive and dangerous and ultimately self-destructive." She also said that since these events happened 20 years ago, Miranda cannot understand why they mean so much to Steve now. She added that Steve would have another moment of "passion" with Nicola, leaving Miranda to "feel the terrible pain of betrayal again."

Just when it looks like Steve and Miranda are set for a reconciliation, Miranda's former boyfriend, Dean Naughton (Peter Bensley) is introduced. This allowed the writers to explore Miranda's backstory further as Dean was in fact her first love that Nicola referred to. Coghill spoke of Miranda's sudden change in character during an interview with a columnist from Inside Soap stating that she felt Steve was always Miranda's rebound after the breakdown of her and Dean's romance. Coghill felt the plot had dug up old history for the pair and also noted it as the point Miranda finally comes to a decision to live her life freely, stating: "Miranda's hesitant at first, but comes to realise she only has one life to live, and it's time for her to live it." Miranda becomes infatuated with Dean all over again and Coghill stated that she felt Miranda had become caught in a whirlwind. She also thought Miranda was too willing to trust Dean. When Steve finds out he is devastated and Coghill felt that the writers were repeating her backstory all over again. A writer for Holy Soap described Dean as a "rather creepy individual who somehow manages to charm Miranda". They felt that Miranda had put a "further nail into the coffin of her marriage to Steve" by having sex with Dean, and that reuniting with him was just her way of trying to escape from her marital problems. They added that "her feelings get the better of her".

=== Departure ===
In March 2009, it was announced that the Parker family were to be written out of the show after both Mignon and Bastoni decided to leave to concentrate on other commitments. Following Bridget's death, Miranda cannot cope with her grief and all of the memories of Ramsay Street, so she and Steve decide to leave.

== Storylines ==
Steve and his family move to Erinsborough from Sydney, so Steve can open a new veterinary clinic. The family arrive in Ramsay Street to visit Steve's brother Ned. Shortly after opening the clinic, Steve and Miranda are forced to move in Ned and his girlfriend, Janae Timmins (Eliza Taylor-Cotter) when their apartment floods. Miranda quickly becomes friends with Susan Kennedy (Jackie Woodburne) and volunteers to organise a party for Sky Mangel (Stephanie McIntosh) and Boyd Hoyland (Kyal Marsh).

Miranda is hurt when she discover that Bridget has been talking to Riley on the phone, as he always hangs up on his parents. Miranda forces Bridget to tell her where Riley is and the family go to visit him. Riley returns to Ramsay Street with them and Miranda senses that Riley is thinking about his birth parents. Riley tells Steve and Miranda about his feelings of rejection, but they tell him they love him. With her family back together, Miranda organises a book launch for a celebrity chef. Miranda is horrified to find out that Bridget is in hospital following a hit-and-run. Susan realises that she hit Bridget and confesses to Miranda, who is furious. Miranda vows to have Susan prosecuted. Bridget tells Miranda that she does not blame Susan for the accident, as she fell into the road. Miranda then tells Susan to plead not guilty at her trial. After a couple of months, Miranda forgives Susan and they become friends again. Miranda and Steve begin working as janitors at Erinsborough High to earn extra money.

Miranda's sister Nicola arrives in Ramsay Street and she seduces Riley, who later leaves for a job in the Middle East. He leaves a note for his parents, Miranda catches Nicola reading it and they argue. Nicola tells Miranda that she felt that her only use had been to provide bone marrow for Miranda when she had leukaemia. Miranda finds out about Nicola and Riley and she also discovers that Nicola kissed Steve. Nicola lets slip that Miranda was in love with another man when she got married and Steve decides to move out, believing that Miranda does not love him. Nicola tries to seduce Steve and she later poisons him. Miranda then calls the police and has her sister sectioned. Steve and Miranda continue having marital problems and Steve asks for a divorce. Whilst working at Lassiter's one night, Miranda encounters Dean. Dean is the man Miranda was in love with when she married Steve. Miranda spends the night with Dean, but realises it is a mistake and goes home. However, Steve is at their home and he sees Miranda return. He decides to sell up and to move to Oakey, but as he still loves Miranda, the couple make up.

When Bridget and her boyfriend, Declan Napier (James Sorensen) get married in a secret ceremony, Miranda is angry that she was not there, but she throws them a party back home. Bridget gives birth to Miranda's first grandchild, India (Alia and Gabriella De Vercelli), at a music festival. Steve and Miranda listen to the birth via Karl Kennedy's (Alan Fletcher) phone. While on their way to take India to visit relatives in Oakey, Steve swerves the car to avoid an escaped horse and the car overturns. Miranda suffers a broken arm and minor injuries. Bridget dies from internal injuries in the hospital, which devastates Steve and Miranda. Following Bridget's funeral, Steve and Miranda decide to take India and move to Oakey. However, they decide to leave India with Declan and they leave together.

== Reception ==
The Parker family's entrance to the show was watched by an average 1.05 million viewers in Australia. Following their arrival, Network Ten's head of drama Dan Bennett praised the new cast members saying "It's probably the strongest cast we've ever had".

During a feature about how to get the magic back on Neighbours, Ruth Deller of television website Lowculture said she would like to see Miranda "developing her Ruth/Susan/Janelle sass – which we feel is unlikely, seeing as in Neighbours, that sass is usually formed by being dicked over by a man and not standing for it". Deller also added that Ramsay Street "needs a new busybody, and she could easily be it". A Daily Record described Miranda's relationship with her sister Nicola as "dodgy", adding "But, then again, if your sister announced she was in love with your husband and was determined to steal him from you, then you'd be pretty cheesed off with her too."
