= Riley Parker (Neighbours) =

- Neighbours character
- Portrayed by: Sweeney Young
- Duration: 2007–2008
- First appearance: 17 August 2007
- Last appearance: 23 May 2008
- Introduced by: Ric Pellizzeri
In-universe information
- Occupation: Journalist
- Mother: Joanna Hale
- Adoptive father: Steve Parker
- Adoptive mother: Miranda Parker
- Sisters: Bridget Parker
- Half-sisters: Josie Hale; Cara Hale
- Grandfathers: Jim Parker
- Grandmothers: Kitty Parker; Yvonne West
- Uncles: Stuart Parker; Ned Parker
- Aunts: Nicola West
- Nieces: India Napier
- First cousins: Mickey Gannon

Riley Parker is a fictional character from the Australian Network Ten soap opera Neighbours, played by Sweeney Young. He made his first on-screen appearance on 17 August 2007. He was involved in various storylines most notably an incest plot. The character was axed in 2008 and departed on 23 May 2008.

== Creation ==
In 2007 Neighbours suffered one of its worst decline in ratings and several key changes took place, including the introduction of a new family. Network Ten drama executive Dan Bennett revealed that the show would return to the focus on relationships and family dynamics Several regular characters left the show to make way for the Parker family. Australian drama actress Nikki Coghill was cast as matriarch of the family, Miranda Parker, and Steve Bastoni was cast as her husband Steve Parker. Eloise Mignon was also cast as sister Bridget Parker. Sweeney Young received the part of Riley. Young revealed he auditioned alone for throughout the audition process, whereas Mignon and Coghill both auditioned together in later stages through screen tests. The Parker family made their first appearance on-screen in July 2007, marking the start of the show's renovation.

In 2008, Riley was axed from the soap opera, in which Young stated: "I'm incredibly excited, I can’t wait to take all the stuff I've learnt at Neighbours and apply it to other productions."

== Development ==
=== Characterisation ===
Riley is mysterious and has a dark past. During an interview with entertainment website Last Broadcast Young described Riley stating: "He's a little dark, but a good guy. He has a bit of trouble expressing himself, particularly where his parents and his past are concerned, but at the same time he's very genuine." Riley's adoption has affected his persona, of this during a separate interview with Last Broadcast, Young said: "The problem is, he feels sensitive about being given up for adoption because it's like a rejection to him. He's also insecure about his adoptive parents and feels unsure about whether they really love him". Riley had a distinctive laugh which was created by Young. Young's unshaven look was also a concept incorporated into Riley's appearance. Young auditioned with long hair and a noticeable beard, and the producers liked the look for Riley. Of the producer's control over Young's appearance, he was asked if he would change his hair after filming his final scenes, he said that he wanted "Definitely shorter hair, long hair is annoying. As soon as work permits I’m going to cut my hair really short."

=== Incest ===
In 2008 Riley was involved in a controversial storyline where it was revealed Riley had been pursuing a romance with his adoptive aunt Nicola West (Imogen Bailey). Various media sources reported the story after Australian conservative groups voiced their disapproval of the storyline. The media dramatised the plot in the wake of a real life case in which an Austrian man Josef Fritzl raped his daughter, the storyline was likened to the real life case. The Australian Family Association accused the soap opera of using plots mirroring real life events to attract viewers, branding them 'opportunistic'. The president of its Queensland branch commented on the storyline stating: "Is Neighbours redefining itself as some kind of sick mockumentary? Incest is a very sensitive subject that I wouldn't expect a prime-time program aimed at children to be tackling. They are dealing with young minds who can't fully understand or analyse the issues." Executive producer Susan Bower defended the storyline stating: "It is controversial, but all our stories are handled carefully." The storyline aired regardless of the criticism, in which Heather Pryor (Georgina Andrews) and Bridget discover their affair.

== Storylines ==
Riley moves to Erinsborough and reconciles with his adopted parents, Miranda Parker (Nikki Coghill) and Steve Parker (Steve Bastoni), with whom he has had a falling-out. Riley previously had been doing a course for Veterinary Science and had stated that he had been getting distinctions but near the end of the course decided he did not want to become a Veterinarian.

Riley meets Elle Robinson (Pippa Black) at Charlie's Bar and the two became friends. After falling for her, he competes for her affection with Oliver (David Hoflin). Riley gains a cadet-ship at the Erinsborough News, and shares it with Elle as a result of her losing her old job and finding an interest in journalism. Riley helps his sister Bridget cope with the disability she gets after a car accident.

Riley and Elle secretly go to an illegal dance party to report for Erinsborough News even though they had clear instructions not to. They manage to leave after the roof collapses. Riley then reveals his feelings to Elle through a draft of a news article. Elle sees it, blushes and tells Riley that she is not ready to be involved in a relationship, which Riley does not believe. Riley then catches the eye of his new co-worker Heather and develops a relationship, which makes Elle jealous, but she agrees to be friends with Riley.

Miranda's sister Nicola arrives in Ramsay Street and it is revealed that she and Riley have a past romantic history. When she kisses him, Heather sees and is disgusted Riley would cheat on her with his aunt. They keep up the affair and attempt to keep it from Miranda and Steve. After Bridget discovers Riley and Nicola's relationship, he becomes worried and is desperate to get away from Nicola, so he decides to go to the Middle East to be war correspondent against his parents' will. While the family are out for dinner, Riley packs his bags and leaves a note in an envelope for Steve and Miranda labelled "Mum and Dad" on it. However, after he walks out, Nicola takes the envelope and puts it in her pocket. Miranda later sees it and is very annoyed with Nicola. Later on, when Miranda and Steve find out that Nicola had been having sex with Riley, they try to get him to come back but are unsuccessful.

== Reception ==
Riley has a unique laugh that has been noted in media sources, of this Last Broadcast branded his laugh as an 'awesome' creation. In 2007, Ruth Deller of television website Lowculture gave Riley a mixed review. She said "Riley is decent enough eye candy, but he needs to take his shirt off a bit more, get screwed over by Elle Robinson and go all dewey-eyed with tears. And get a plotline". Sarah Ellis from Inside Soap said that Riley is no bad boy and acted "so nice that he makes cuddly Harold look like a criminal mastermind".
