= Sienna Cammeniti =

- Neighbours character
- Portrayed by: Erin McNaught
- First appearance: 2 May 2008
- Last appearance: 3 October 2008
- Introduced by: Ric Pellizzeri
In-universe information
- Occupation: Nurse; Waitress
- First cousins: Carmella Cammeniti
- Other relatives: Chloe Cammeniti

Sienna Cammeniti is a fictional character from the Australian soap opera Neighbours, played by model Erin McNaught. McNaught was cast in the role to help boost falling ratings in Australia. The character made her first screen appearance on 2 May 2008. Sienna was introduced as the cousin of the established Carmella Cammeniti (Natalie Blair). In July 2008, McNaught decided to cut her contract short and Sienna departed on 3 October 2008. During her time on Neighbours, McNaught's casting and acting were negatively received by critics, acting agencies and viewers.

== Creation and casting ==
In November 2007, it was announced that model and former Australian Miss Universe representative, Erin McNaught would be joining the cast of Neighbours to help boost falling ratings in Australia. Producers also recruited fellow model Imogen Bailey (Nicola West) and former Australian Idol contestant Dean Geyer (Ty Harper) in a bid to "sex up" the cast. McNaught took acting classes in preparation for the role of Sienna and she began filming her first scenes on 17 December. On joining the show, McNaught said "Everyone has grown up watching Neighbours, of course I am nervous. It is a big change from what I have been used to doing".

In March 2008, McNaught's contract was extended by three months after she impressed the Neighbours bosses. However, she was still described as a guest cast member and was not expected to be signed beyond the deal. In July 2008, it was announced that McNaught had opted to relinquish her role as Sienna, for the benefit of her relationship with Braith Anasta and because she was homesick. On her departure McNaught said "It was a great experience and I'm really happy with what I have been achieving in acting – so it was a tough decision to make.

== Development ==
McNaught spoke to TV Week about Sienna and her past with her cousin Carmella (Natalie Blair), saying "There was a bit of rivalry between Sienna and Carmella when they were growing up, so it'll be interesting to see what happens now. Sienna's been working in the country and has come to the city to try her hand at something new and discover more about who she is." When asked if there was any romance coming up for her character, she said "I'm not sure. She might even set her sights on someone who's already taken! That could be well be in her nature."

Network Ten describe Sienna as being "one of a seemingly endless array of Cammeniti cousins", she is attractive and passionate, but can occasionally be misguided. Sienna and Carmella did not get on when they were younger and they often fought each other for their family's attentions. Ten said they tried to be "more beautiful and charming than the other. While they're both old enough to know better now, it remains to be seen whether Carmella and Sienna can leave their competitiveness behind."

== Storylines ==
Sienna leaves her job as a nurse in the countryside and moves to Erinsborough due to problems at home. She goes to Harold's Store to see her cousin Carmella, but discovers that she is in Italy. Sienna meets Carmella's partner Marco Silvani (Jesse Rosenfeld) and Lou Carpenter (Tom Oliver). Lou becomes besotted with Sienna and he offers her a job at the store after she bakes him some muffins. When Carmella returns she is shocked to find Sienna working at the Store. Sienna explains that it is time they got to know each other properly, as they did not get along when they were younger. Sienna makes friends with the locals.

Carmella steals money from the store's till and Sienna is wrongly accused and fired. Carmella later owns up and Sienna is rehired. Sienna helps Carmella admit that she has a shopping addiction. She also moves in with Carmella and Marco. Carmella throws a party in the bush for Marco's birthday and he proposes to Carmella. A bush fire breaks out, causing the group to scatter. Sienna is not hurt, but Marco is seriously injured. After he is told that he does not have long to live, Marco and Carmella marry, with Sienna acting as bridesmaid.

Ty Harper's (Dean Geyer) band hold auditions for a female lead singer and Sienna is tempted to audition. As Ty wants Rachel Kinski (Caitlin Stasey) to be the lead singer, he organises a group of bad singers to audition first, in the hope that his bandmates will pick Rachel. Ty overhears Sienna singing along to some music and picks her to audition. Sienna sings reasonably well and Ty's bandmate, Logan Ellis (Nick Cain), falls for her and she is hired.

Sienna struggles with some of the band's songs and Carmella asks Rachel to help her. Rachel admits that she also struggles with the songs and helps Sienna to improve her sound. At her first performance, Sienna becomes nervous and asks Rachel to sing with her. Ty tries to persuade his bandmates that Rachel is better and he gets Zeke Kinski (Matthew Werkmeister) to turn Rachel's volume up on the sound system. The performance goes well, but when Logan tries to kiss Sienna, she quits the band, believing that she was hired for her looks.

Sienna's cousin, Rosetta (Natalie Saleeba) has a baby and sends Carmella tickets to fly out to Italy for a visit. But Carmella is too busy with the store and Sienna uses the tickets instead. Lou tries to get Sienna and Logan to reconcile, so Sienna will stay in Australia. But after Sienna and Logan make up, she announces that Logan is coming with her. Sienna promises Lou that she will return one day.

== Reception ==
During her time with Neighbours, McNaught's acting skills came in for criticism and the decision to add McNaught, Bailey and Geyer to the cast outraged the acting industry. Agents accused the show of "sacrificing quality in favour of ratings". Chief of Brisbane acting agency Ego Management, Mark Eaton said that the shows producers were "simply hunting for eye-candy when they hired Erin and fellow lad mags' favourite Imogen Bailey". He added "This is all done to try to get viewing figures up the producers are not worried about the quality of the show at all". Viewers said that McNaught's acting made them "cringe". Fiona Byrne of the Herald Sun said "Despite enormous press interest surrounding her joining the show, McNaught's character has made little impact on the series and she seemed to be counting down the days until her contract with the show finished".
