= Skating on Thin Ice =

2005 Australian TV series

- Presented by: Jamie Durie
- Country of origin: Australia
- Original language: English
- No. of seasons: 1
- No. of episodes: 4

Production
- Production location: TCN-9 Willoughby, New South Wales
- Production company: Freehand Productions

Original release
- Network: Nine Network
- Release: 3 July – 24 July 2005

Related
- Torvill and Dean's Dancing on Ice

Skating on Thin Ice was a short-lived Australian celebrity reality television programme broadcast on the Nine Network in 2005. Hosted by Jamie Durie, nine celebrities learnt to skate with the ultimate goal being to perform with Disney on Ice, with proceeds going toward children's charity, CanTeen.

Nine revived the concept more successfully in 2006 as Torvill and Dean's Dancing on Ice, also hosted by Durie.

== Contestants ==
The celebrities included:

- Deni Hines – singer
- Kim Kilbey – presenter
- Imogen Bailey – model
- James Blundell – singer
- Belinda Green – former beauty queen
- Regina Bird – Big Brother 3 winner
- Vince Sorrenti – comedian
- David Whitehill – presenter of Hot Source
- Peter Everett – presenter and home designer

== See also ==
- List of Australian television series
- List of Nine Network programs
