= Sweeney Young =

Australian actor (born 1989)

- Born: 24 March 1989 (age 36); Australia
- Occupation: Actor
- Years active: 2004–present

Sweeney Jerome Young (born 24 March 1989) is an Australian actor known for his role as Riley Parker in the soap opera Neighbours.

== Early life and education ==
Young grew up in the northern suburbs of Melbourne. He graduated from University High School in 2006.

== Career ==
Young played Riley Parker in the long-running soap opera, Neighbours for 111 episodes. He has been on-screen in Australia since 22 August 2007. His on-screen family includes mother Miranda (Nikki Coghill), father Steve (Steve Bastoni) and sister Bridget (Eloise Mignon).

In 2006, Young was one of a trio who created a radio show/podcast called Male Chauvinist Pigs for SYN FM. The show ran for 8 episodes between 22 June 2006 and 26 December 2006.

Guest appearances include episode 'One For the Road' from Blue Heelers in 2005 as Hugh Grace, telemovie Little Oberon in 2005 as the ghost of Simon Gaunt and also a single episode appearance on Neighbours in 2004, as an older boy called Braydden Tuffnell that Summer Hoyland (Marisa Siketa) mistakenly thought fancied her.

In 2008, Young appeared alongside Alison Richards and Mark Dogget in a short film titled "A Little Understanding." Shot by local Melbourne film makers The Night Elephants, the film was part of the international film festival 15/15. The festival asks participants to shoot and edit a finished short within 15 hours. For his role in the film Sweeney took out the prize for Best Male Actor.

In January 2012, it was revealed that Sweeney had joined the cast of Animals as Jack Young.

Sweeney recently received a Certificate of Appreciation from the Leukaemia Foundation for his participation in the annual charity event 'World's Greatest Shave'.

Currently young is working towards a career as a stand-up comedian. He performs at venues all around Melbourne.

== Filmography ==
=== Film ===
Year	Title	Role	Notes
2010	Cryptopticon	The Steganographer	
2012	Animals	Jack Young	

=== Television ===
Year	Title	Role	Notes
2005	Holly's Heroes	Charlie McCorkindale	Episode: "Crossing the Line"
2005	Blue Heelers	Hugh Grace	2 episodes
2005	Little Oberon	Simon Gaunt	Television film
2007–2008	Neighbours	Riley Parker	171 episodes
2008–2009	Rush	Mark Ward / Jared	2 episodes
2010	Bed of Roses	Jake O'Reilly	Episode: "Rainbow Warriors"
2011	Terra Nova	Foster	Episode: "Bylaw"
2014	Chris & Josh	Steve	Episode: "Netboys"
