= Peter Everett =

Australian television presenter

- Born: Charleville, Queensland, Australia
- Occupation: Television host
- Known for: Ready Steady Cook

Peter Cyril Everett is an Australian television host. He is probably best known for hosting the Australian adaptation of cook show Ready Steady Cook, which aired on Network Ten. He is known for appearing on Changing Rooms which aired on the Nine Network in the late 1990s. He has also taken part in two reality television competition series: Skating on Thin Ice in 2005 and The Celebrity Apprentice Australia in 2013. He also appeared on Dating Naked as a contestant.

== Early life ==
Everett was born in Charleville, Queensland. He moved to Brisbane in his adolescence. Everett has lived in the United States and Hong Kong. He then moved to Sydney to run the Queen Street Brasserie.

== Career ==
In 1998, Everett worked as an interior designer on the Australian adaptation of Changing Rooms. He co-hosted Renovation Rescue, and hosted Amazing Homes. He also took part in reality figure skating series Skating on Thin Ice in 2005.

In 2006, Everett replaced Nick Stratford as host of the Australian adaptation of Ready Steady Cook, a cooking game show with a similar format to that of the original British program. It features two teams, each with a chef and a guest, competing to prepare meals from given ingredients. Everett opens each show and poses questions to teams about the meal's preparation. The show premiered on Network Ten in 2005. In June 2011, Everett left Ready Steady Cook; he was replaced by comedian Colin Lane.

After having a year off being on television in 2012, Everett competed on season 3 of The Celebrity Apprentice Australia on the Nine Network in 2013.

== Criminal allegations ==
Everett was charged in July 2025 with sexually touching a 16-year-old boy without consent. He pleaded not guilty to the charge.
