= Black+White =

Australian photography, arts and culture magazine (1992–2007)

- Categories: Photography, Arts, Style
- Frequency: Quarterly
- First issue: 12 November 1992
- Final issue Number: January 2007; No. 88
- Company: Studio Magazines PTY
- Country: Australia
- Language: English

Black+White (also stylized as (not only) Black+White or Not Only Black+White) was a photography, arts and popular culture magazine, published in Australia between 1992 and 2007.

== History and profile ==
Issue No. 00 was launched on 12 November 1992 and the final issue No. 88 was published in January 2007. Black+White was commissioned by Marcello Grand, publisher of Studio Magazines Pty Ltd.

Located in Sydney, Black+White was designed by British graphic designers Katherine Carnegie and Matthew Hawker between 1992 and 1994, with later design and typography by Art Director+Designer Andrew Godfrey, designers Cassidy Hall, Christopher Holt and Art Director/Designer Tim McIntyre. Andrew Godfrey's work for the magazine received 15 international awards for magazine design and typography.

Black+White was edited initially by Horacio Silva and then in later years by Karen-Jane Eyre and Nick Dent. The magazine was published six times a year by Studio Magazines Pty Ltd.

Black+White was a pictorially-led publication that became an internationally acclaimed visual arts magazine showcasing the world's best image makers. It included interviews with photographers and celebrities and features on popular culture and current events. The magazine gained notoriety for publishing nude photographs of mainly Australian celebrities, athletes, pop and soap stars.

== Spin-off magazines ==
- B+W Mode
- (not only) Blue
- (not only) Sport
