= Bridget Parker =

Fictional character

- Neighbours character
- Portrayed by: Eloise Mignon
- Duration: 2007–2009
- First appearance: 23 July 2007
- Last appearance: 21 July 2009
- Introduced by: Ric Pellizzeri
In-universe information
- Occupation: Student; Erinsborough Veterinary Clinic assistant; Gym assistant
- Mother: Joanna Hale
- Adoptive father: Steve Parker
- Adoptive mother: Miranda Parker
- Brothers: Riley Parker
- Half-sisters: Josie Hale; Clara Hale
- Husband: Declan Napier (2009)
- Daughters: India Napier
- Grandfathers: Jim Parker; Gary Fuller
- Grandmothers: Kitty Parker; Yvonne West
- Uncles: Stuart Parker; Ned Parker
- Aunts: Nicola West
- First cousins: Mickey Gannon

Bridget "Didge" Parker is a fictional character from the Australian soap opera Neighbours, played by Eloise Mignon. In 2007 the show was revamped to boost falling ratings in Australia. As part of this, the show's focus returned to family dynamics and the character of Bridget and her family were created and introduced. Bridget made her first on-screen appearance on 23 July 2007. She arrived in Erinsborough from Sydney with her father and mother, Steve and Miranda. During her time in Neighbours, Bridget's storylines included being run over by Susan Kennedy, falling in love with Declan Napier, finding her birth mother and falling pregnant at seventeen. In March 2009, the decision was taken to write the Parker family out of the show after both Mignon and Steve Bastoni, who played Steve, quit. Mignon wanted to return to her studies and she had enough of Neighbours. Bridget died on-screen on 21 July 2009 after suffering internal injuries, which she sustained in a car crash. The character was met with polarised reactions from viewers and critics, though her pregnancy storyline was voted the best of 2008 during a poll on the official website.

== Creation and casting ==
In 2007, Neighbours suffered one of its worst decline in viewers and several key changes took place to boost the ratings. Network Ten drama executive, Dan Bennett revealed that the show would return to its focus on relationships and family dynamics. Writers created and introduced a new family, the Parkers, who already had a link to Ramsay Street in the form of Ned Parker (Daniel O'Connor). The family made their first on-screen appearance in July 2007, marking the start of the show's renovation.

Former Silversun actress Eloise Mignon was cast in the role of school girl Bridget Parker, despite being five years older than the character she would portray. Steve Bastoni and Nikki Coghill were cast as Bridget's adoptive parents Steve and Miranda Parker respectively and Sweeney Young was cast as Bridget's biological brother Riley.

== Character development ==
=== Characterisation ===
Bridget has been portrayed out of conjunction with the stereotypical 'girly image', she is sporty and athletic. Mignon has described her as open, honest, outdoor kind of girl. Stating that like herself Bridget had grown up with keen interests for climbing trees, cycling and swimming in rivers, non-typical female interests. She also branded Bridget as a 'sporty tomboy'. During an interview, Mignon said that Bridget's relationship with Declan changes her and she feels more independent from her family. She also becomes more determined as a person.

=== Disability ===
One of Bridget's first high-profile storylines was coping with a disability, after Susan Kennedy (Jackie Woodburne) hit Bridget with her car. She had been paralysed on one side of her body, the storyline saw her trying to regain the complete use of her body. Mignon explained during an interview with media reporting website Last Broadcast, the research that had been carried out and the effects on the character stating: "Bridget suffers extreme physical difficulties as a result, because she's such a sporty tomboy, to be incapacitated suddenly poses emotional problems for her. To make sure that I could understand better what Bridget's going through, I studied medical notes on paralysis and disability on the internet."

=== Teenage pregnancy ===
One of the most important storylines for the character of Bridget was when she discovered that she was pregnant with Declan's child. As the storyline progressed, Bridget was seen considering abortion or adoption, before ultimately deciding to have the child with Declan's support. This caused controversy among conservative family groups in Australia who accused the Neighbours of using their characters to normalise teenage pregnancy. Pro-Family Perspectives director Angela Conway said: "[Teenage pregnancy] is not something that should be considered the norm, programmes like Neighbours can make the behaviours that lead to teenage pregnancy seem normal and acceptable. A lot of kids just aren't ready to get their head around details of explicit sexuality." Neighbours executive producer Susan Bower defended her character's storyline stating: "I am quite sure a lot of people are not happy with this storyline. We decided we would show the ramifications on the teenagers' lives." Mignon said that the storyline between Declan and Bridget was not shallow, trite or vulgar, further adding she would not have liked to film the storyline if it was and branded it as showing emotional spectrum of pregnancy justice. Critics also slammed the show, noting that Neighbours has a G-rating and the storyline could lead to more promiscuity and teenage pregnancies among young viewers. The storyline continued despite the controversy it caused and Declan and Bridget became parents to a daughter, India.

=== Departure ===
In March 2009, it was announced that the Parker family were to be written out of the show after Mignon and Bastoni decided to leave to concentrate on other commitments. Mignon, Bastoni and Coghill filmed their final scenes in April 2009. Mignon announced that her reason for leaving the show was so that she could return to studying an Arts degree at Melbourne university. Mignon said "I didn't want to defer uni forever and, to be honest, I'd had enough of the Neighbours experience". The Neighbours writers took the decision to kill the character off. Viewers saw Bridget being injured in a car accident while travelling to Oakey. Bridget underwent surgery and she then had a premonition of her death. Her vision comes true and she dies from internal injuries. The Metro newspaper called the scenes "tear-jerking".

When Mignon heard how Bridget was going to leave the show, she said "I was quite honoured. I feel I've been given good scope in terms of drama – Bridget had a baby, got married and died. I got the soap opera trifecta!" On Bridget and the Parker's exit, Bower said "It's the story that keeps on giving for another three or four weeks. It's very well storylined, beautifully acted and shot. It's a tremendous amount of work for which we're all very proud".

== Storylines ==
Steve and Miranda Parker adopted Bridget when she was 6 years old, along with her older brother Riley. Being adopted never worried Bridget and it was irrelevant to her day-to-day life as Steve and Miranda were the only parents she had ever known.

Upon her arrival to Ramsay Street, Bridget makes friends with Zeke Kinski (Matthew Werkmeister) and she joins his football team, despite opposition from bully Justin Hunter (Chris Toohey). Bridget joins Declan Napier when he begins joyriding. During a race with Justin, they are pursued by the police. They return home thinking they escaped, only to find the police waiting for them. Bridget is banned from seeing Declan, but she sneaks out to meet him at the park, where they argue. On her way home, Bridget trips and falls into the road in front of a car being driven by Susan Kennedy. Susan blacks out, a result of suffering from multiple sclerosis, and hits Bridget. She drives off, unaware of what she has done. Bridget is found and rushed to the hospital, where she undergoes emergency surgery for a bleed on her brain. She remains unconscious, until Rachel Kinski (Caitlin Stasey) visits and pleads with her to wake up. Bridget's hand moves and she awakes the next day. However, she cannot feel anything down the left side of her body and she is told that she could be permanently disabled. Susan realises that she caused the accident and comes forward. She is arrested and put on trial. Bridget remembers that she fell into the road and that the accident was not Susan's fault, and she tells the court. During a rehabilitation class at the swimming pool, Bridget meets Josh Taylor (Liam Hemsworth). Following a disastrous date with Declan, where Bridget is given the impression that Declan cannot handle her disability, Bridget begins dating Josh. Following a roof collapse at an illegal dance party, Bridget and Josh are both trapped in rubble. Declan carries Josh out before coming back for Bridget. Another collapse traps Declan and Bridget together and Declan tells her that he does not have a problem with her disability. Shortly after, Bridget begins to walk without her walking aid and her mobility returns.

Bridget bonds with Chris Knight (Luke Mitchell) and she asks him to the school formal. She joins him in a hotel room, where Chris tries to pressure her into having sex with him. He turns aggressive and Bridget pushes him away and flees the hotel, not knowing that Chris hit his head. Chris later dies in hospital and Bridget's father confesses to the police that he attacked Chris to protect Bridget. Steve is charged with murder, but Bridget goes to his trial and tells the court that she pushed Chris in self-defense. Throughout the ordeal, Declan is a big support to Bridget and they begin a relationship.

Bridget tells Declan that she wants to have a physical relationship with him. Not long after, Bridget discovers that she is pregnant. Declan runs away scared of becoming a father and Bridget plans to have an abortion. Declan returns and commits himself to Bridget and the baby. Declan proposes to Bridget and though she is hesitant, they get engaged. Bridget decides to look for her birth mother and Joanna Hale (Laura Lattuada) turns up in Erinsborough. After meeting Joanna, Bridget decides to give up her own baby against Declan's wishes. However, when Libby Kennedy (Kym Valentine) miscarries her own baby, Bridget realises that she wants hers. Declan and Bridget marry in a church in the country witnessed by their friends. Bridget gives birth to a daughter at a music festival and the couple name her India. Bridget and Declan struggle to cope with their new lifestyle. On a road trip to Oakey to visit relatives, Steve crashes the car. Bridget rescues India and they are found by a search team and are taken to the hospital. Bridget suffers a premonition that she is going to die and makes Declan promise that he will look after India. Shortly after, Bridget dies from a blood clot. Bridget's death leaves Steve and Miranda devastated and they move away from Ramsay Street not long after her funeral. Declan is left to raise India by himself.

== Reception ==
The Parker family's entrance to the show was watched by an average 1.05 million viewers in Australia. Following their arrival, Network Ten's head of drama Dan Bennett praised the new cast members saying "It's probably the strongest cast we've ever had". The character received negative criticism from Ruth Deller of television website Lowculture. Shortly after her arrival, Deller said "'Didge' either needs to get over herself, fast, or die in a freak accident". Deller later called her "a whiny, self-absorbed pain in the arse". However, following Bridget's death in 2009, Deller wrote that she had grown fond of Bridget and Declan as a couple.

A Daily Record reporter branded the character "little miss goody two-shoes". Of her pregnancy storyline, they said "nobody saw this coming". Bridget's pregnancy was nominated for Best Storyline at the 2009 Inside Soap Awards. Fans of the show also voted the storyline the most popular of 2008 in a poll conducted by the official Neighbours website. The website announced that they had received over 5,500 votes and they added "We all love a bit of drama, and who would argue that Bridget falling pregnant at the age of 16 and Declan's rebellion against the constraints of fatherhood wasn't the juiciest story of 2008!"

In 2016, Katie Baillie writing for Metro included Bridget on a list of the "worst Neighbours characters" ever. Baillie placed Bridget at number one because "she was pretty unpopular at the time, and even remembering her now makes my blood boil." She also scathed that she was "selfish, bitchy, whiney and just generally wound everyone up" but no one could understand what made her so annoying. Baillie concluded that even Bridget's death was annoying. Bailie also noted the existence of an online forum called "Get Rid Of Bridget" and claimed that viewers complained to the producers because "she was too annoying to watch".

Of Bridget's final scenes, a reporter for the Daily Record wrote "This soap has often been accused of being a bit soft or lightweight. When people leave, they're not usually killed off - they just move to Sydney or Tasmania, and are never seen again. Well, hold onto your hats because we're about to be confronted with a genuine drama." Sarah Megginson of website SheKnows included Bridget's death in her "8 Most Memorable Neighbours Moments" feature in October 2009. She said "When our beloved teen mum Bridget 'Didge' Napier died in a car crash – just weeks after giving birth to her baby girl! – we couldn't help but shed a tear or twelve for new dad Declan and baby India." In 2015, a Herald Sun reporter included Bridget's death in their "Neighbours' 30 most memorable moments" feature.

Susan Bower stated in a 2010 interview that she thought the storyline between Bridget and Chris Knight was "brilliant". She also added that the storyline featuring Bridget's pregnancy and her relationship with Declan was "extraordinary – something we were terribly proud of."
