= Anouk van Dijk =

Dutch dancer and choreographer (born 1965)

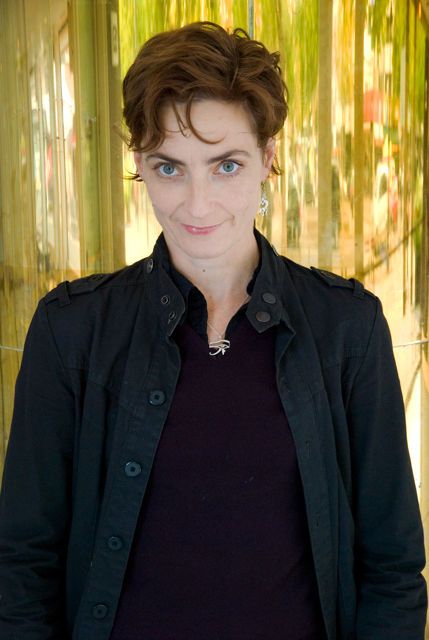
- Anouk van Dijk. Photography by Szilvia Sztankovits
- Born: 20 February 1965 (age 61); Velp, Gelderland, Netherlands
- Occupations: Choreographer, dancer, artistic director, teacher

Anouk van Dijk is a Dutch choreographer, dancer, artistic director and teacher. She was Artistic Director of Australian dance company Chunky Move and founder of Countertechnique.

Van Dijk graduated from the Rotterdam Dance Academy in 1985. For almost a decade she was a lead soloist with amongst others the Rotterdam Dance Group and Amanda Miller's Pretty Ugly Dance Company. In 1996 Anouk van Dijk dedicated herself exclusively to the creation and performance of her own work. She has been running her own dance company since 1998.

Van Dijk gained an international breakthrough in 1999 with her work ‘Nothing Hurts’, a collaboration with Falk Richter. ‘Nothing Hurts’. was selected for the Berliner Theatertreffen and toured Europe afterwards.

During the Dutch Dance Days in 2000, Van Dijk was awarded the Lucas Hoving Prize for her production ‘Microman’.

She developed during her career her own movement system, called the Countertechnique. The Countertechnique discards the dominant opinion in the dance world that all movement relates to one center in the body. Instead, in the Countertechnique dancers always keep their alignment and balance by continually giving counterdirections to each movement.

Van Dijk has been appointed artistic director of Chunky Move, succeeding Gideon Obarzanek, who founded the company in 1995.

In 2006, she was named one of "25 to Watch" by Dance Magazine.
