= Susan Bower =

Australian television producer and screenwriter

- Occupations: Television producer, Television writer
- Years active: 1992–present

Susan Bower is an Australian television producer and television writer best known for her work on the soap opera Neighbours. Bower is also the founder of the production company Bower Bird Productions.

== Career ==
Bower is a former nurse who worked at The Alfred Hospital for 20 years before getting her scriptwriting breakthrough on A Country Practice, where she provided the show's medical information. She later progressed to trainee script editor where she wrote the episode "A Virtuous Woman" in 1992, eventually becoming the story editor of the show.

She also wrote for Big Sky, for Neighbours in 1994 and 1996, and for Home and Away in the early 1990s.

Bower became an executive producer in 2004, producing McLeod's Daughters. From this she went on to produce various productions including Little Oberon in 2005 and Sea Patrol in 2007 before becoming executive producer of Neighbours in 2008. On 25 October 2011, it was announced Bower would be leaving Neighbours in December 2011 to move into a new international role with FremantleMedia.

In 2013, Bower was mentioned in a lawsuit by Kym Valentine. Valentine alleged that Bower, former producer Neal Kingston, legal director Stephen Tosser and FremantleMedia Australia engaged in unlawful discrimination when Valentine was off sick with pneumonia. The lawsuit was later dropped by Valentine after an undisclosed settlement was reached with FremantleMedia.

=== Criticism and controversy ===
In 2008, Bower attracted criticism when Neighbours, among other television programmes, was accused of being "too white". In defence, Bower said that the core cast were from a variety of ethnic backgrounds including French, Italian, South African, Maltese, Danish, Portuguese and Swedish (despite all the actors originating from those nationalities being ethnically white). She said that the soap's characters have a wide variety of backgrounds, including Tibetan and Belarusian (the Kinski siblings) and that a Greek character would be joining the cast. She also stated she would like more ethnic characters in the main cast. Around the time of this criticism, Bower introduced the character of Sunny Lee, portrayed by Korean Australian actress Hany Lee, on a temporary contract to Neighbours.

Bower also received criticism in 2008 for an incest storyline between Riley Parker and his aunt Nicola West. The Australian Family Association accused Bower of using the news event of a South Australian father and daughter revealing they had a child between them to attract viewers. Bower has defended the storyline saying that "it is controversial but all our storylines are carefully handled".

In 2008, Kym Valentine, who had played Libby Kennedy in Neighbours for over a decade, was taken seriously ill and had to take a break from filming for five weeks. Rather than writing Libby out of the series during that time, Bower decided to recast her with Michala Banas. Bower defended the decision by saying "A recast was the only option. The stories for her character were very big. It would have been ridiculous for the show to stop them."

Bower again attracted criticism in 2009 for Neighbours being "too white". Bower's response was that she was working to get more ethnic diversity into the cast, but she also stated that she was angry that Neighbours had been singled out as Australian advertising also had a lack of ethnic actors.

In March 2009, she was criticised over a teenage pregnancy storyline which saw the character of 17-year-old Bridget Parker (Eloise Mignon) give birth to India Napier. Critics said that it was inappropriate for a G-rated show to cover this type of storyline, Bower has defended the storyline saying that it did not glamourise teenage pregnancy.

As an April Fools'' joke in 2010, Bower released a statement on the official Neighbours website, claiming that Ramsay Street would be renamed 25th Avenue to mark the 25th birthday of the soap. The joke was met with widespread hostility from fans.

In 2010, Bower was criticised for re-casting the part of Declan Napier to Erin Mullally when James Sorensen announced that he was leaving Neighbours. Sorensen had been training to join the Australian army for over a year. Some fans called the move "daft", others called it "ridiculous" and "a really awful decision". This decision was defended by Neighbours, saying that the character was recast because of storylines already planned.

In November 2010, Bower denied speculation that Neighbours would be "sexed up" when it moves to Eleven in 2011. Of the speculation, she said "There's this bloody rumour going around that because we're on Eleven it's going to be raunchy. I'm not going to do that. Why would I do that? England loves us the way we are. Australia loves us the way we are. Yes, we've taken a hit in the ratings, but so has everybody else." She also denied that there was low cast morale and denied that the recent batch of cast departures were related to the channel change.

== Personal life ==
On 25 January 2010, it was announced that Bower's sister Lynn Bayonas had died from cancer. Bayonas was the producer of A Country Practice when Bower got her scriptwriting breakthrough by providing the show with medical information. Neighbours paid tribute to her death by displaying a title card as the credits rolled.

== Filmography ==
=== Television ===
Role	Production	Duration
Writer	A Country Practice	1992
Writer	A Country Practice	1994
Writer	Home and Away	1994
Writer	Neighbours	1994
Producer/Script Editor/Writer	Echo Point	1994–95
Writer	Mirror Mirror 2	1996
Script Editor	Sweat	1996
Writer	Neighbours	1996
Writer	Big Sky	1997
Storyliner	Crocadoo	1997
Writer	All Saints	1998
Script Producer/Story Editor	All Saints	1998
Producer/Writer	McLeod's Daughters	2000–05
Story Producer	Sea Patrol	2007–08
Co-Producer	Canal Road	2008
Executive Producer	Neighbours	2008–11

=== Film ===
Role	Production	Duration
Producer	Little Oberon	2005

== Awards ==
Bower has been nominated for two awards. In 2004, she was nominated for an AFI Award for 'Best Television Drama Series' for McLeod's Daughters. In 2005, she was nominated again for an AFI award, this time for 'Best Telefeature or Mini Series' for Little Oberon. Neither were won.
