= Nikki Coghill =

Australian actress (born 1964)

- Born: Nicola Vicars Coghill; 4 January 1964 (age 62); Melbourne, Victoria, Australia
- Education: Victorian College of the Arts; University of Melbourne
- Occupation: Actress
- Years active: 1979–present
- Known for: The Flying Doctors; Neighbours
- Children: 2

Nicola Vicars Coghill (born 4 January 1964) is an Australian actress. She is best known for playing the roles of Sister Jackie Crane in The Flying Doctors, and Miranda Parker in Neighbours.

== Early life ==
Coghill was born in Melbourne. Before her acting career, she trained as a classical ballet dancer throughout her school years. She spent six months touring with the Australian Opera as one of their dancers at the age of 15. She completed her final year of school at Victorian College of the Arts in Melbourne, specialising in dance, but went on to study an Arts degree at University of Melbourne, where she also got involved in extra-curricular university theatre.

== Career ==
After graduating and getting an agent, Coghill landed a six-month contract in the soap opera Starting Out in 1983. playing Margot Fallon-Smith. She also starred in 1986 Vietnam War miniseries Sword of Honour as Vivienne and 1990 miniseries All the Rivers Run II as Delie – both, alongside fellow Neighbours alumnus, Alan Fletcher.

Other appearances in miniseries include A Fortunate Life (1986) and The Fremantle Conspiracy (1988). She held a recurring guest role in All the Way from 1988 to 1989 as Terry O'Rourke. From 1991 to 1992 she starred as Sister Jackie Crane in The Flying Doctors. In 1994, she had a regular role in The Bob Morrison Show as Lizzy Morrison. From 1999 to 2000 she appeared as the regular character Dr. Liz Daniels in Thunderstone.

In 2007, Coghill joined the cast of long-running Australian soap opera Neighbours, as events organiser Miranda Parker – wife of Steve Parker, and mother of Bridget Parker and Riley Parker. In 2009, Coghill, together with Eloise Mignon and Steve Bastoni departed Neighbours. Mignon, who played her daughter Bridget, wanted to leave the series to continue her studies. Without Bridget, the writers felt Steve and Miranda were not viable as characters.

Coghill has made guest appearances in numerous other Australian television series and movies. Her television roles include Waterloo Station, Sons and Daughters, Willing and Abel, Rafferty's Rules, The Flying Doctors, Acropolis Now, Hey Dad..!, Minder in Australia, Time Trax, G.P., Blue Heelers, Guinevere Jones, McLeod's Daughters, City Homicide, It's a Date, Offspring and Bad Mothers.

Her film credits include Annie's Coming Out (1984), Rebel (1985) alongside Matt Dillon, Playing Beatie Bow (1986), Twelfth Night (1986) opposite Geoffrey Rush, Dark Age, The Time Guardian, Running from the Guns (all 1987) and Point of No Return (1994).

Coghill has also undertaken voiceover work and theatre work, performing in productions for Melbourne Theatre Company, Playbox Theatre Company and La Mama.

== Filmography ==
=== Film ===
Year	Title	Role	Type
1984	Annie's Coming Out	University Girl	Feature film
1985	Rebel	All Girl Band	Feature film
1986	Playing Beatie Bow	Dorcas 'Dovey' Bow	Feature film
1986	Twelfth Night	Party Guest	Feature film
1987	Dark Age	Cathy Pope	Feature film
1987	The Time Guardian	Annie	Feature film
1987	Uncle Sam's at the Door		Film short
1987	Running from the Guns	Jill	Feature film
1994	Point of No Return	Kate Maguire	Feature film
2013	Noble Silence	Shell	Film short
2017	Six Steps to Eternal Death	Mother	Film short

=== Television ===
Year	Title	Role	Type
1982	The Sullivans		
1983	Starting Out	Margot Fallon-Smith	85 episodes
1983	Waterloo Station		1 episode
1984	Six of the Best		
1984	Sons and Daughters	Nikki Holland	3 episodes
1984	Soldiers		TV film
1986	A Fortunate Life	Evelyn	Miniseries, 1 episode
1986	Sword of Honour	Vivienne	Miniseries, 4 episodes
1987	Rock 'N' Roll Cowboys	Teena Tungsten	TV film
1987	Willing and Abel	Jenny	1 episode
1988	The Fremantle Conspiracy	Hanna	Miniseries, 2 episodes
1988	Mike Willesee's Australians	Lilly Molloy	Anthology series, episode: "Les Darcy"
1988	Stringer	Susie	1 episode
1988–1989	All the Way	Terry O'Rourke	3 episodes
1989	Rafferty's Rules	Jenny Burns	1 episode
1989	The Saint in Australia (aka Fear in Fun Park)	Felicity	TV film
1989; 1991–1992	The Flying Doctors	Sister Jackie Crane / Sandra Wetherby	56 episodes
1990	All the Rivers Run II	Philadelphia 'Delie' Edwards	Miniseries, 4 episodes
1991	Hey Hey It's Saturday	Contestant ("Red Faces" segment)	1 episode
1991	Acropolis Now	Rebecca	1 episode
1992	Hey Dad..!	Yolande Le Clerc	2 episodes
1993	Minder in Australia	Susan Hamilton	1 episodes
1993	Time Trax	Katherine Vickers	1 episode
1994	The Bob Morrison Show	Lizzy Morrison	26 episodes
1994	Sale of the Century	Contestant	1 episode
1996	G.P.	Rea	1 episode
1997	Blue Heelers	Felicity McMurtrie	1 episode
1999–2000	Thunderstone	Dr. Liz Daniels	Seasons 1–3, 45 episodes
2001	The Pretender		1 episode
2002	Guinevere Jones	Faerie Queen	2 episodes
2002	McLeod's Daughters	Gabi Harding	1 episode
2007–2009	Neighbours	Miranda Parker	230 episodes
2010	City Homicide	Heather Worthington	Season 3, 1 episode
2013	It's a Date	Pauline	1 episode
2017	Offspring	Christine Edmund	Season 7, 1 episode
2019	Bad Mothers	Jo	1 episode
	Coopers Crossing	Sandra	
	Uncle Sam’s at the Door	Teena	

== Theatre ==
Year	Title	Role	Type
	Rat	Vivian Alderson	La Mama, Melbourne
1984	The Real Thing	Debbie	Melbourne Athenaeum with MTC
1984	Filumena	Lucia	Melbourne Athenaeum with MTC
1987	Shakers		Belvoir St Theatre, Sydney
1992	A Month of Sundays	Wilson	Russell Street Theatre, Melbourne with MTC
1993	The Temple	Miranda	West Gippsland Arts Centre, Monash University, Melbourne with Playbox Theatre
1994	The Glass Mermaid	Kristin	Malthouse Theatre, Melbourne with Playbox Theatre
1995	Triptych	Mandy	Carlton Courthouse with La Mama, Melbourne
1995	The Snake Pit		La Mama, Melbourne
2001	Hit & Run	Janet	Carlton Courthouse with La Mama, Melbourne
2004	The Frail Man	Amelia	Malthouse Theatre, Melbourne with Playbox Theatre

== Personal life ==
Nikki Coghill has two daughters and lives in Melbourne with her husband.
