= Imogen Bailey =

Australian actress

- Born: 7 July 1977 (age 49); Canberra, Australia
- Occupation: Actress
- Years active: 1997–present
- Known for: Neighbours character Nicola West
- Height: 5 ft 3 in (1.60 m)

Imogen Bailey (born 7 July 1977) is an Australian actress and former model. She has been depicted on the covers of men's magazines, including Ralph, FHM Australia, Black+White. On TV Bailey has appeared in various reality shows, Celebrity Big Brother (July–August 2002), Skating on Thin Ice (2005), and Celebrity Survivor (2006), which was set in Vanuatu. In 2008 she portrayed Nicola West on Australian TV soap opera, Neighbours for six months. As a singer her vocals were featured on the 2003 single "If U Want Me" by United Kingdom dance musician, Michael Woods. It peaked at No. 46 on the UK Singles Chart and No. 1 on the component, UK dance chart; No. 62 on the ARIA Singles Chart and No. 5 on its Dance Charts. In August 2012 Bailey participated in the second season of the Special Broadcasting Service (SBS) TV documentary series, Go Back to Where You Came From. She is an advocate for animal rights and has worked on many People for the Ethical Treatment of Animals (PETA) campaigns. Bailey is also an advocate for asylum seekers in Australia. She shares her home base between Sydney and Los Angeles.

== Biography ==
=== Early years ===
Imogen Bailey was born on 7 July 1977 in Canberra. For her primary school years she lived in the Pambula region, initially on a farm and later in a milk bar in town. At nine years old one of her poems was published in the local newspaper in nearby Merimbula. For secondary education she attended Melrose High School in Pearce and then Phillip College in Canberra. She attended a TAFE institute and studied marketing.

=== Career ===
==== Modelling ====
Bailey started her modelling career in the late 1990s, initially photographed for advertisements in fashion magazines, she prepared self-published calendars from 2000 starting with "Imogen Odessey 2000". As a sports model, in January 2001, she appeared in Inside Sport. She appeared in bikinis, and eventually nude, for men's magazines including in Ralph, FHM Australia, Black+White .

She noted that the entertainment industry tended to typecast models: "For me the girl I am in a photo shoot is a character that is portrayed by me for the shoot. If I am doing a sexy shoot then I play the sexy model. Now the problem comes when you want to cross over into other avenues in the industry such as singing or acting and people in the industry see you as just 'sexy'".

==== Television ====
In August 2001 Bailey appeared as Carmen Jefferson for one episode of TV soap opera, Home and Away. She has also appeared in several reality shows including Celebrity Big Brother (July–August 2002), Skating on Thin Ice (2005), and Celebrity Survivor (2006), which was set in Vanuatu in the South Pacific. In 2020 she was inducted into the inaugural Australian Survivor Hall Of Fame.

From January 2008 for six months Bailey portrayed Nicola West on TV soap opera, Neighbours. Prior to landing the role she had undertaken acting lessons for some eight months. The character made her popular with a wider young female audience in Australia. In the series, Nicola is Miranda Parker's younger sister, the character was involved in controversial story lines including an incestuous relationship with an adoptive nephew, Riley Parker.

In August 2012 Bailey participated in the second season of the TV documentary series, Go Back to Where You Came From, on Special Broadcasting Service (SBS).

==== Music ====
Bailey's vocals were featured on the 2003 single "If U Want Me" by United Kingdom dance musician, Michael Woods. It peaked at No. 46 on the UK Singles Chart and No. 1 on the component, UK dance chart. It peaked at No. 62 on the ARIA Singles Chart, No. 5 on its Dance Charts, and No. 2 on its Hitseekers Chart.

In that year she also featured on Supafly's cover version of Prince's "Erotic City". After Hurricane Katrina (August 2005) she provided a track, "Force of Nature", for a charity album by various artists, Hurricane Healing.US: Music That Heals, Vol. 1 (2005).

=== Activism and charity work ===
==== The Hot Potato ====
In 2013, Bailey joined John Jarratt and Hunters & Collectors front man Mark Seymour to change thinking on asylum seekers. Bailey became the face of the Hot Potato Campaign, which tackled the issue by visiting ten rural towns in ten days, speaking to people using an ice-breaker of a free hot potato meal. The campaign hoped to dispel myths about asylum seekers which persist in Australia.

==== Animal rights ====
Bailey is outspoken on the subject of animal rights and has lent her likeness to many People for the Ethical Treatment of Animals (PETA) campaigns. In February 2007 appeared caged in a makeshift cramped enclosure as part of a campaign for the Human Battery Cage: to highlight "the inhuman practice of chicken battery farming". She told the media that "People expect Australia to be leading the world in animal welfare. There is no excuse for the way they are treated, there are always alternatives". The rights to sit in the cage with Bailey and Lindsay McDougall (guitarist for Australian punk band Frenzal Rhomb), were auctioned off on eBay by Animal Liberation.

=== Personal life ===
At the age of 16 years Bailey left her family home in Canberra, she moved to Sydney and started a personal relationship with an older man, Ahmed, a Lebanese-Australian and practicing Muslim. On the SBS series, Go Back to Where You Came From (August 2012), she revealed that he was her partner for eight years. When staying with his family she regularly wore a hijab, and sometimes a burqa:

"She was a bikini model by day who read the Koran by night. She fasted during Ramadan and even, on occasion, wore a burqa". Their relationship ended prior to 2001 as she focussed on modelling, "[he] was ready to do the marriage and babies thing. But my career as a model was blossoming, so we went in separate directions".

In September 2008 Bailey revealed she had had anorexia nervosa, in an interview with UK magazine, NOW: "I went through a minor, but still not very good, anorexic stage and actually got down to less than 40 kg". Her weight loss occurred over about a year from 2000 to 2001 and was influenced by "being surrounded by other anorexics and the stress of a break-up from an unfaithful boyfriend". Family and friends intervened and she sought assistance for her condition.

== Filmography ==
=== Film ===
| Year | Title | Role | Notes |
|---|---|---|---|
| 2005 | Man-Thing | Sarah | |
| 2005 | Feed | Veronica | |
| 2007 | Azur & Asmar: The Princes' Quest | Princess Chamsous Sabah (voice) | English dub |
| 2009 | The 7th Hunt | Ariel Clarke | |
| 2011 | Chinese Takeout | Hazel Crow | Short film |
| 2014 | Housemates | Ellie | Short film |
| 2015 | McCracken | Dr Fox | Short film |
| 2016 | Strange Date | Judy | Short film |
| 2021 | The Hunt | - | |

=== Television ===
| Year | Title | Role | Notes |
|---|---|---|---|
| 2000 | Popstars | Self/Contestant | 1 episode |
| 2001 | Life Support | Dinner Party Guest | 1 episode |
| 2001 | Home and Away | Carmen Jefferson | 1 episode |
| 2002 | Celebrity Big Brother | Self/Contestant | 24 episodes |
| 2002 | High Octane 3 | Presenter | |
| 2005 | Skating on Thin Ice | Self/Contestant | |
| 2006 | Celebrity Survivor | Self/Contestant | 12 episodes |
| 2008 | Neighbours | Nicola West | 99 episodes |
| 2009 | Life of Riley | Ella | 1 episode |
| 2013 | The Hot Potato: The Road to Transformation | Self | |
