= Eloise Mignon =

Australian actress (born 1986)

- Born: 18 September 1986 (age 40); Melbourne, Victoria, Australia
- Occupation: Actor
- Years active: 1996–present

Eloise Mignon (born 18 September 1986) is an Australian actress. She began her career starring in children's television shows Legacy of the Silver Shadow and Silversun, before appearing in the Australian soap opera Neighbours. She has starred in numerous theatre productions.

== Early life ==
Mignon was born in Melbourne to French director Jean-Pierre Mignon, and Katharine Sturak, an American. Mignon was educated at Melbourne Girls College, Wesley College and St Michael's Grammar School. Mignon has a Bachelor of Arts (Honours Degree) from the University of Melbourne.

== Career ==
Mignon worked from a young age in independent theatre, notably with The Black Lung Theatre and Whaling Firm in their multi award-winning production Rubeville where she played Trixi.

Her screen credits include a role in Legacy of the Silver Shadow and a main character Mara Lomax in children's sci-fi series Silversun. She also appears as a prostitute in the Australian film Three Blind Mice (2008), directed by Matthew Newton

From 23 July 2007, Mignon began appearing as Bridget Parker in the soap opera Neighbours. In March 2009, it was announced that Mignon had quit the show along with Steve Bastoni, who played her character's father. Mignon confirmed that she was leaving to return to studying an Arts degree, which she had deferred upon joining the serial. Mignon's character was killed-off.

Mignon performed as Jennifer in the play In A Dark Dark House at the Red Stitch Actors Theatre in Melbourne until 22 August 2009. She performed for the Melbourne Theatre Company in The Grenade, and Return to Earth. In her first screen role since leaving Neighbours, Mignon appeared in a 2010 episode of City Homicide as Layla Pullman.

Since 2010 Mignon has primarily worked in professional theatre in Australia and France. In 2011 Mignon played the role of Hedvig in Belvoir's production of the Henrik Ibsen play The Wild Duck opposite Toby Schmitz and Anita Hegh, directed by Simon Stone. Her performance was praised with one critic commenting "Mignon articulates the young girl's confusion in heartbreaking fashion". The production was invited to perform at the International Ibsen Festival in Oslo as well as the Weiner Festowchen and Holland Festival. Mignon's performance was critically very well regarded.

In 2012 Mignon returned to the Belvoir stage appearing first in Every Breath by writer and director Benedict Andrews, followed by Strange Interlude where she interpreted Madeleine with director Simon Stone, and a new production of the Noël Coward play Private Lives. In 2013 she returned to work with Simon Stone on The Cherry Orchard for Melbourne Theatre Company where she interpreted Anya. Mignon played contortionist Sarah Norden in the opening episode of Season 3 of Miss Fisher's Murder Mysteries in 2015.

From 2014 to 2016 she collaborated on and performed in two projects with the German auteur Falk Richter- Complexity of Belonging in conjunction with choreographer Anouk van Dijk for Chunky Move and Je Suis Fassbinder with French theatre director Stanislas Nordey at the Théâtre National de Strasbourg and Théâtre National de la Colline, Paris. Both projects were written with her in mind; she performs the role 'Eloise'.

In 2024, Mignon appeared in the television drama Ladies in Black as Jenny.

== Filmography ==
Film performances
Year	Title	Role	Notes
2003	Redskin	Aislin	Victorian College of the Arts Short film
2006	Wholesalers	Girl	Short
2008	Three Blind Mice	Grace Newton	
2017	Lost Gully Road	Cassie	
2022	Lacerate	Gloria	Short

Television performances
Year	Title	Role	Notes
2002	Legacy of the Silver Shadow	Fiona	Main cast
2004	Silversun	Mara Lomax	Main cast
2007–2009	Neighbours	Bridget Parker	Main cast
2010	City Homicide	Layla Pullman	Episode: "Good Cop Bad Cop"
2014	Miss Fisher's Murder Mysteries	Sarah Nordern	Episode: "Death Defying Feats"
2023	The Clearing	Lou	Episode: "Suffer the Little Children"
2024	Ladies in Black	Jenny Giles	Episode: "Beautiful Game"

Theatre performances
Year	Title	Role	Theatre	Director	Notes
1997	Le Malade Imaginaire	Louison	Melbourne French Theatre Company	Michel Bulla	
2003	Entrails	Doll	Oubykh Theatre Corp	Glyn Roberts	
2004	As I Like You	Narrator	Oubykh Theatre Corp	Glyn Roberts	
2004	The Jaundice Table	Various	Oubykh Theatre Corp	Glyn Roberts	
2004	The Desert	Girl	Oubykh Theatre Corp	Glyn Roberts	
2007	Rubeville	Trixi	The Black Lung Theatre and Whaling Firm	Thomas Henning	
2009	In a Dark, Dark, House	Jennifer	Red Stitch Actors Theatre	Wayne Pearn	
2010	The Grenade	Lola McTavish	Melbourne Theatre Company; Sydney Theatre Company	Peter Evans	
2011	The Wild Duck	Hedvig	Belvoir St Theatre	Simon Stone	
2011	Return to Earth	Alice Waster	Belvoir St Theatre	Aiden Fenessey	
2012	The Wild Duck	Hedvig	Malthouse Theatre; International Ibsen Festival, Oslo	Simon Stone	
2012	Every Breath	Olivia	Belvoir St Theatre	Benedict Andrews	
2012	Strange Interlude	Madeleine Arnold	Belvoir St Theatre	Simon Stone	
2012	Private Lives	Sybil Chase	Belvoir St Theatre	Ralph Myers	
2013	The Wild Duck	Hedvig	Holland Festival, Amsterdam; Weiner Festwochen, Vienna	Simon Stone	
2013	The Cherry Orchard	Anya	Melbourne Theatre Company	Simon Stone	
2014	Complexity of Belonging	Eloïse	Chunky Move, Melbourne International Arts Festival	Falk Richter and Anouk van Dijk	
2015	Complexity of Belonging	Eloïse	Schaubühne am Leinener Platz; Théâtre National de Chaillot; Spring Festival Utrecht; National Theatre of Taiwan	Falk Richter and Anouk van Dijk	
2016	Je Suis Fassbinder	Eloïse	Théâtre National de Strasbourg; Théâtre National de La colline, Théâtre de Vidy Lausanne; Théâtre National de Bretagne; MC2 (Grenoble)	Falk Richter and Stanislas Nordey	
2017	Complexity of Belonging	Eloise	Musikhuset Aarhus	Falk Richter and Anouk van Dijk	
2017–2018	Les trois Soeurs	Irina	Odéon-Théâtre de l'Europe	Simon Stone	
