= Carmella Cammeniti =

Fictional character in Neighbours

- Neighbours character
- Portrayed by: Natalie Blair
- Duration: 2003–2008, 2011
- First appearance: 26 November 2003
- Last appearance: 15 March 2011
- Introduced by: Ric Pellizzeri (2003); Susan Bower (2011)
In-universe information
- Occupation: Student; Barmaid (2003); Magazine editor (2004); Nun (2005–2006); Hospital orderly (2006); Business manager (2007–2008); Store manager and co-owner (2008)
- Father: Rocco Cammeniti
- Mother: Lucia Cammeniti
- Sisters: Rosetta Cammeniti; Rosaria Cammeniti
- Husband: Marco Silvani (2008)
- Daughters: Chloe Cammeniti
- Uncles: Raimondo Cammeniti
- Aunts: Maria Cammeniti
- Nephews: Marco Yeats
- First cousins: Teresa Cammeniti; Sienna Cammeniti; Bella Cammeniti; Vinny Cammeniti
- Other relatives: Angelica Cammeniti; Sofia Cammeniti

Carmella Cammeniti (also Silvani and Sister Mary Catherine) is a fictional character from the Australian Network Ten soap opera Neighbours, played by Natalie Blair. She appeared on a recurring basis from 2003 to 2005, then became a main character from 2006 to 2008, before making a final guest appearance in 2011. Carmella was created as a replacement for Nina Tucker, portrayed by Delta Goodrem, who was written out of the series when Goodrem became ill. Her early storylines, including a romance with Connor O'Neill (Patrick Harvey), were originally intended for Nina. The daughter of a protective gangster father, Carmella was initially a "fun, feisty" character. She gradually became "tortured [and] depressive", with storylines which saw her attract the attention of a stalker, become a nun, suffer facial scarring, develop an addiction to prescription medication and lose her husband after a bushfire.

Carmella was the second member of the Cammeniti family to appear in Neighbours, after her father, Rocco (Robert Forza). She was later joined by her mother, sister, and two cousins. She had long-standing relationships with Marco Silvani (Jesse Rosenfeld) and Oliver Barnes (David Hoflin), the father of her daughter, Chloe (Sarah May). When Blair resigned from the serial in 2008 in order to pursue new projects, the producers arranged for a separated Carmella and Oliver to reunite. The two briefly returned three years later, to consolidate their family unit.

Blair won the "Most Popular New Female Talent" Logie Award for her portrayal of Carmella, and was additionally nominated for several Golden Logies and Inside Soap Awards. Critics have deemed Carmella as one of the series' most popular characters. Blair's versatility has attracted praise, though several publications have highlighted the implausibility of many of Carmella's storylines.

== Storylines ==
Carmella is introduced as a barmaid at the Erinsborough bar Lou's Place. She becomes romantically involved with her colleague, Connor O'Neill (Patrick Harvey), to the disapproval of her father Rocco (Robert Forza). A feud with Connor's ex-girlfriend, Michelle Scully (Kate Keltie), results in Carmella slapping her and leaving the area. She later returns the following year, reconciles with Connor and helps him to maintain access to his daughter Madeleine (Madison Lu). To prove that she is business-minded, Carmella becomes a magazine editor. She departs from Erinsborough suddenly after she becomes the victim of a stalker, Frank Romano (Lliam Amor). Before she leaves, she drives around with a shotgun in an attempt to kill Frank. Upon her return, Carmella loses Connor's affection to Serena Bishop (Lara Sacher). She attempts to ruin their relationship, which results in Serena's mother Liljana (Marcella Russo) slapping her to warn her off. Carmella then tries a different approach; she borrows money from her mother Lucia (Maria Mercedes) to pay for an operation Madeleine needs, then blackmails Connor into spending time with her. She claims to have borrowed the money from a crime mob who are harassing her for repayment, which prompts Connor to steal money to try to pay it back. When Carmella realises the trouble she has caused, she tells Connor the truth and leaves.

After a period of absence, Carmella's mother sends Connor on a secret mission to find her daughter. He discovers that Carmella has become a nun, and is living in a convent as Sister Mary Catherine. During her time as a nun, she grows close to Ned Parker (Daniel O'Connor), who encourages her to become a recording artist after hearing her sing. Carmella does it to make him happy, but admits that she does not really enjoy singing. She withdraws from their relationship as she feels that Ned is prying too much into her private affairs.

Carmella admits she arranged the sale of her cousin Teresa's (Hannah Greenwood) unwanted baby. A fellow nun suggests that she takes time off from the convent. She complies and leaves her role as a nun behind. Teresa has a breakdown and throws a saucepan of boiling water at Carmella, who is left with severe facial scarring and becomes increasingly secluded. She is convinced by Will Griggs (Christian Clark) to have plastic surgery to lessen the scarring. Ned tells Carmella that he loves her, but Carmella has fallen in love with Will. Soon thereafter, Will leaves the country without notice. His younger brother Oliver Barnes (David Hoflin) arrives, and explains that Will had a double identity. Carmella has short-lived relationships with Oliver and teenager Ringo Brown (Sam Clark). She becomes addicted to prescription drugs, and later discovers that she is pregnant with Oliver's baby, and may have harmed the baby through her addiction.

Carmella begins an online business with Marco Silvani (Jesse Rosenfeld), and develops an attraction to him. She initially resists as she is still in love with Oliver, but learns to her disappointment that he does not reciprocate her feelings. Carmella gives birth prematurely by Caesarean section; the condition of her daughter, Chloe (Sarah May), who is placed in the neonatal intensive-care unit, quickly improves. Mother and daughter move in with Marco, prompting a jealous Oliver to file for sole custody of Chloe, though he later rescinds this decision. Marco proposes to Carmella and she accepts, however later that day he is severely injured in a bushfire. Carmella marries him from his hospital bed, and Marco dies shortly afterwards. Following his death, Carmella believes she is haunted by Marco's spirit. Oliver moves to New York, but she declines his invitation to accompany him. He later moves to Portugal, and a few months later, Carmella and Chloe leave to be with him. They briefly return to Erinsborough three years later when Oliver's mother Rebecca (Jane Hall) breaks up with her husband Paul (Stefan Dennis), to convince her to come and live with them and she does so.

== Development ==
=== Creation and characterisation ===
"My character has gone through having her face burnt, being a nun, she was sexually assaulted, she almost lost her baby, she had a pill addiction, shopping addiction. I wouldn't recommend moving to Erinsborough."

— Blair on Carmella (2008)

Carmella was created following Delta Goodrem's sudden departure from Neighbours due to illness. Three months' worth of scripts were rewritten, and Carmella was introduced to fill the void left by Goodrem's character, Nina Tucker. As a school graduate, Blair had unsuccessfully auditioned for another role in the serial, but impressed casting director Jan Russ. Six months later, Russ contacted Blair and asked her to audition for the role of Carmella. She was cast immediately, due to the urgent need to fill the void left by Goodrem. She played Carmella on an episodic basis in 2003, then returned for a longer period in 2004, and briefly in 2005. Blair returned to Neighbours in 2006, and in September 2007, signed a contract keeping her in the show for another year.

The serial's official website described Carmella as "the youngest daughter of local mafioso Rocco Cammeniti. She grew up spoilt and sheltered from the real world, which made her a force to be reckoned with as soon as she was old enough to break free of her father's influence." Carmella underwent many changes during her tenure. Blair initially described her as a "fun, feisty and foxy sort of character". However, Carmella became depressed through her life's travails, having been stalked by Frank Romano, sold her cousin Teresa's baby and subsequently become a nun. Before her official confirmation in the convent, Carmella goes clubbing with ex-boyfriend Connor. Describing Carmella's reasoning, Blair stated: "Carmella is thinking, 'Is what I'm about to go ahead with, - becoming a nun - the right choice?' She wants to be sure she's making the right decision about what she'll do for the rest of her life." Blair confirmed that after that night Carmella had "all the answers that she needed" to live the rest of her life. Blair enjoyed the opportunity to play a nun, but was glad when the storyline concluded as it meant Carmella got to have fun again.

=== Relationships ===
Carmella's relationship with Connor was originally scripted for Nina Tucker, but was transferred to Carmella by the producers on Goodrem's departure. Upon Carmella's introduction, her only family member was her mobster father Rocco, who had been sent to prison. In 2006, Carmella was given a sister, when Natalie Saleeba was cast in the role of Rosetta Cammeniti. Blair opined that Rosie's inclusion brought out different sides to Carmella's character. Many viewers told Blair they felt the casting was good because they look alike. One of the significant changes to Carmella was that she started having fun again—Blair felt this meant they worked well together. Later, Erin McNaught was cast as her cousin Sienna Cammeniti. McNaught commented that there had been a rivalry between the cousins in their youth, so it would be interesting to see what unfolded between them.

Following the dissolution of Carmella's relationship with Oliver, Blair commented that Oliver would "always have a special place in Carmella's heart". Although Carmella began dating Marco, Blair felt that Chloe's premature birth strengthened the connection between Carmella and Oliver. She explained that Carmella "feels desolate and suddenly the connection Carmella's always had with Oliver is heightened. Together they name their baby Chloe and it's Marco who feels shut out." Following Chloe's birth, Carmella decided to put her love life to one side, and put her baby daughter first. She told Marco she did not want him in her life; he planned to leave town without a word to her, except a love note and a present to Chloe. Discussing the state of her relationship with Oliver and Marco at this point, Blair assessed: "I don't think it's so much of a love triangle anymore. Oliver made his feelings for Carmella very clear - he doesn't love her in that way. But he still doesn't want another man looking after his child. So there'll be more tension between the [three] of them. And things get even more complicated over the next few months."

Marco was later killed in a bush fire disaster. Describing the filming process, Blair stated: "Shooting the scenes for the bush fire and everything surrounding it - the wedding - the funeral - was so draining. It was full on." Blair had to film scenes involving Carmella singing at Marco's funeral, which she deemed "close to home" because she had done it at her grandmother's funeral. She found it distressing, as they filmed in a real graveyard. She had previously been reluctant to sing on-screen but felt it was justified for Marco's funeral. Blair commented on Carmella's repetitive bad luck, stating: "She's gone through so much already, just to get to this point. This should really be a happy time for her, but it's not." After all the hurdles she faced, Carmella became a stronger person. Blair said it saw her become well-equipped to look after her child.

=== Departure and return ===
In 2008, Blair expressed frustration that Carmella had become a "very tortured, depressive character and there was no light at the end of the tunnel." She described the role, which went through enormous transformations, as being one that had pushed her acting abilities. Blair's pleas to the show producers to let the down-on-luck Carmella be up-beat again were rejected. In June 2008, the actress confirmed her plans to leave the series when her contract expired. Speaking of her decision to leave, Blair said: "I made the decision in December [...] I am eager to try new things and go to a place where people have no idea what I have done, I want to experiment with what works for me and what doesn't as a performer." Producers confirmed they did not intend to kill her character off, as they hoped for her to return again in the future. A spokesperson for the programme's broadcaster, Network Ten, stated: "Obviously, we've loved having Natalie on the show all these years and we're really sad to see her go [...] and hope to see her on Ramsay Street again one day in the future." Blair later admitted she was surprised at her rise popularity whilst playing Carmella.

Carmella's exit storyline was devised months prior to Blair's departure. Producers had planned to reunite Carmella and Oliver and have them leave together, however Hoflin decided to go travelling, meaning he was unavailable for filming. Prior to Hoflin's departure, he and Blair filmed scenes showing their reunion. Scripts were quickly rewritten to portray Oliver in Portugal, where Hoflin was in real life, instead of New York where Oliver left for upon his exit. Describing her reaction to Carmella's scripts towards the end, Blair commented: "After a while I'd open my script and say, 'Please give me one scene where I'm smiling'. And then I'd read the script and think, 'Damn - no smiling scenes again'." Blair had originally hoped that Carmella would be killed on-screen, as she felt a dramatic send off would have been fitting. After the "tragic" final year Carmella underwent, Blair decided she was happy with the exit because "something finally goes right for her". Blair also opined: "It's a really lovely story and I think the fans will be happy with it." Carmella's "happy exit storyline" saw her leaving in a taxi surrounded by all of her friends waving her off, after they convinced her to start a new life with Oliver.

In September 2010, it was revealed that Blair and Hoflin would return to film scenes in the last two weeks of production in 2010, and the episodes would be shown in early 2011. Carmella returns for two episodes in March 2011. Blair said she could not resist the return, which acts as a catalyst in Rebecca Robinson's (Jane Hall) departure. Blair felt it fitting because both Carmella and Oliver have history with Paul Robinson (Stefan Dennis) and want to "protect Rebecca and watch out for her best interests".

== Reception ==
In his book Super Aussie Soaps, Andrew Mercado brands Carmella, the mobster's daughter, as "the mafia princess". In 2005, Blair won a Logie Award for "Most Popular New Female Talent" following her appearances as Carmella. By the time Blair was made an official cast member, The Courier-Mail declared that Carmella was a Ramsay Street favourite. The actress was also nominated for a Golden Logie for "Most Popular Personality" in 2007, and once again 2008. Blair was nominated in the category of "Sexiest Female" at the 2007 Inside Soap Awards, and had a joint nomination with David Hoflin for "Best Couple". Fiona Byrne of the Herald Sun remarked that Carmella was becoming one of the show's most popular characters. At the following year's Inside Soap Awards, she was nominated in the "Best Storyline" category for her custody battle over Chloe with Oliver, as well as "Sexiest Female" again.

Scott Ellis of the Sydney Morning Herald's television magazine stated that, even compared to the slightly surreal standards of most soap operas, Carmella has "been through a wringer". He made a point of the many storylines that transformed the character: "A former party girl turned nun, Carmella has been stalked, slapped, scalded, scarred and even sold a baby. She's found and lost love at least three times, given birth, fought a custody battle, fought kleptomania, and fought various members of her family." In the same vein, The Daily Telegraph praised Carmella's versatility in going from "baby peddler to nun, before suffering severe facial burns that required re-constructive surgery." Inside Soap opined that 2008 for Carmella was "tragedy after tragedy". What's on TV deemed Carmella's scalding with boiling water her most explosive scene, and the Daily Record called it karma for selling Teresa's baby.

Despite her popularity with the viewers, Carmella was negatively received by Ruth Deller of television website Lowculture. On how to get the magic back into Neighbours, Deller said "Axe Carmella. Or at least make her a nun again, which was the only time she was interesting". Deller also said she would have rather seen Carmella and Marco leave the show instead of Rosetta and Frazer. The Liverpool Daily Post said that they had seen implausible storylines in the serial, but Carmella seeing Marco's ghost "takes the biscuit". However, they concluded "At least he offers Carmella some much-needed support." The Daily Record said the ghost scenes were more unforgettable than Bouncer's dream. On the subject of her funeral song they added: "Oddly, none of her friends think she's gone mad, despite an impromptu version of 'Amazing Grace'." Readers of Inside Soap were asked who Oliver should be with out of Carmella and Elle. Carmella came first with sixty-six percent of the vote.
