= Elle Robinson =

Fictional character from Neighbours

- Neighbours character
- Elise Jansen as Elle (2025)
- Portrayed by: Pippa Black (2005–2022); Elise Jansen (2025)
- Duration: 2005–2009, 2019, 2022, 2025
- First appearance: 19 September 2005
- Last appearance: 11 December 2025
- Introduced by: Ric Pellizzeri (2005); Jason Herbison (2019)
- Pippa Black as Elle (2006)
In-universe information
- Occupation: Manager and owner of the General Store; Owner of Lassiter's Hotel; Owner of Charlie's; Owner of Carpenter's Mechanics; Journalist
- Family: Robinson
- Father: Paul Robinson
- Mother: Gail Robinson
- Stepmother: Rebecca Robinson
- Brothers: Robert Robinson; Cameron Robinson; Oliver Barnes (step); Declan Napier (step)
- Half-brothers: David Tanaka; Leo Tanaka; Andrew Robinson
- Half-sisters: Amy Williams
- Grandfathers: Jim Robinson; Ian Hampstead
- Grandmothers: Anne Robinson; Louise Chadwick
- First cousins: Kate Ramsay; Harry Ramsay; Sophie Ramsay

Lucinda "Elle" Robinson is a fictional character from the Australian television soap opera Neighbours, played by Pippa Black. The character made her first screen appearance during the episode broadcast on 19 September 2005, following her off-screen birth in 1989. She is the daughter of established characters Paul (Stefan Dennis) and Gail Robinson (Fiona Corke).

Elle is characterised as a manipulative female who executes various scams and plots against other characters. In one instance Elle feigned a terminal illness for personal gain. The character has been used to play the topical story of post traumatic stress. In June 2009, Black announced her decision to leave Neighbours to seek out other roles. The character departed on 3 December 2009. Black reprised the role for a brief appearance on 9 September 2019 and again on 25 July 2022 for one of the serial's intended final episodes. The character was reintroduced in a regular capacity on 2 September 2025, recast to Elise Jansen, who appeared as Elle until the final episode on 11 December 2025.

== Creation and casting ==
In September 2005, it was announced that the character would be introduced into the series following an off-screen birth. A reporter from TV Week revealed that scheming Elle was another "bad girl", who would give Izzy Hoyland (Natalie Bassingthwaighte) a "run for her money in the scheming stakes!" Black's casting was also publicised and Elle was her first prominent television role. Black planned to travel to London for a working holiday when she was informed that she had secured the role. Black described her experience stating "I admit I was a little star struck turning up to Ramsay Street and meeting everybody, but they all bent over backwards to help out and settle my nerves."

The character has been subject to the SORAS phenomenon, in which the age of Elle and her triplet brothers were increased. Elle was born off-screen in October 1989, so when she debuted in 2005 she would have been almost sixteen, but was aged up to nineteen.

== Development ==
=== Characterisation ===
"It makes for gritty storylines, playing a character that's got a bad-girl streak. Elle is always surprising and shocking me! Although I love it when we get to see her compassionate side – she's not all bad!"

— Black commenting on Elle's manipulative persona. (2007)

Elle's persona has often been portrayed as manipulative and ruthless. Of Elle, Black has described her stating: "Viewers will recognise Elle as a fairly cold, hard, fairly manipulative character". Black also praised her character's maturity during her relationship with Oliver Barnes (David Hoflin) adding: "Lately she’s shown a softer, more mature side to her personality. [...] I like it when the scriptwriters choose to show a caring side to Elle as it makes her more of an interesting person to play". Elle's manipulative ways calmed during her later years in the series, although they still were present during storylines involving Paul; of this Black said: "She’s quite manipulative, because she wants him to be a model dad, she tries to correct his flaws. By keeping an eye on him and his roving eye, she thinks she can make sure he stays out of trouble".

Black has also described her character on a different occasion stating: "She is strong-willed, ambitious and unafraid of standing up for what she believes – even if others don't see things her way. Loyal to her family in any circumstance and has no worries about bending rules to get where she needs to be – she never provides a dull moment!! [...] When she's bad she has an agenda and whether it's right or wrong she'll go through with it. I like her because she's not a quitter. Anyway, I don't like to call her bad...she's misunderstood!!"

Channel Ten publicity describe in depth many of her character traits. They brand her "spoilt princess" image as often being a misconception of her, making note of her single parent upbringing, branding her as a "country girl at heart". Also adding upon her arrival in Paul's life she discovered many ways to get what she wanted involving manipulating people. They also add that she proved over time that she was a "chip off the old block" in her similarities to father Paul Robinson (Stefan Dennis), They also described how Elle changed her ways, stating: "Elle descended to deplorable depths and eventually came to despise herself." They also make note of her desire to overthrow her father in his manipulative actions, stating she has wanted to remain free from his clutches and help change him for the better.

=== Relationships ===
Speaking of her relationship with Ned Parker (Daniel O'Connor), Black states: "She's sees herself as Ned's leading lady, but the problem has been getting him to admit that he likes her, too." Black believes that Elle using the fact that Ned is illiterate to her advantage isn't malicious: "Elle has earned Ned's trust by helping him learn his scripts, although she doesn't realise it, the fact that Ned hasn't responded to her advances before now is more to do with him feeling insecure and inferior. He likes Elle, but has been to scared to do anything about it." Black also states that the play's theme is a good insight to how their relationship actually works adding: "The scene they are practising concerns the couple in the play, but the words ring true for Ned and Elle – wanting each other but not having the courage to act on it." "Elle's admired Ned for so long so it's a relief to know that he feels the same way about her!"

When Ned betrays Elle she attempts to seduce his brother Stuart Parker (Blair McDonough) by stripping naked for him. Black said there was a feeling of "embarrassment" on set and added that the crew were laughing and joking about the scenes. Black said that Elle is "purely acting out of hurt and confusion" when she seduces Stuart. As Stuart was also going through a break up so "misery comes together" in the storyline. Black also stated "I think she's attracted to the fact that Stuart is Ned's older brother and that being with him is really going to hurt Ned. She's also looking for comfort and she finds that in Stu." However, Stuart makes it clear that he is not interested which leaves Elle feeling embarrassed. While they agree to be friends, Black said that "they've formed a really genuine friendship and they share a kiss, they've poured their hearts out and it just happens." Black opined that Elle never loved Stuart but said they had a "definite chemistry".

Elle begins a relationship with Lucas Fitzgerald (Scott Major). Major said that they are completely different and he cannot figure Elle out at first, however is attracted to her. Lucas calls Elle Princess. Major added "It's not smooth sailing for either of them, and it's still up in the air as to whether they'll finally get it together or not." Of Elle and Lucas, executive producer, Susan Bower said "They're our moonlighting couple. They're chalk and cheese and they'll always be chalk and cheese". She said that they are "crazy about each other", but they are always splitting up and getting back together again. Within their relationship, Bower said that they brought in an important issue that concerns a lot of people, "how does one get an adrenalin rush?" Elle and Lucas are "high rollers", so when they get together they need to look elsewhere for their adrenalin rush. When Elle and Lucas split because he is struggling with a gambling addiction, Elle decides to get revenge on him and invites him to her father's stag night at a casino. However, Elle is left feeling guilty about what she has done. The couple get back together, but when Elle discovers that Lucas has withdrawn a large amount of money, she worries that he has started gambling again. However, Lucas brings out a ring and proposes to Elle at the Erinsborough High Deb ball. Elle accepts, but she is late offered a job in New York and Lucas tells her to follow her dreams and they say goodbye at the airport.

=== Departure and returns ===
In June 2009, Black decided to quit the series to pursue other acting roles. Though Black agreed to marginally extend her contract to facilitate her character's exit storyline. Neighbours executive producer Susan Bower decided not to kill the character off because she admired Black's work, adding "the door would always be open for Pippa Black. She's been absolutely marvellous." Bower had expected Black to broaden her career elsewhere and believed Neighbours had been "incredibly privileged" to have had her work on the show for three years. Black later revealed she would be willing to return to the role in the future.

On 1 September 2019, it was announced Black had reprised the role for a brief appearance from 9 September. Elle appears via video call, after Paul learns that she is behind the recent appearances of his former wives. An "unapologetic" Elle explains that while she did not want to sabotage his engagement to Terese Willis (Rebekah Elmaloglou), she hoped seeing his exes would break him "out of his toxic cycle with women."

On 7 May 2022, Dan Seddon of Digital Spy announced Black would reprise the role of Elle for the final episodes of Neighbours following its cancellation. She was one of numerous cast members who agreed to return for the show's end. The "most memorable characters" from each decade were chosen to return and Executive producer Jason Herbison explained that it ensured there was "something for everyone as Neighbours draws to a close."

In July 2025, it was reported that Elise Jansen would portray Elle in the upcoming finale, due to be aired in December 2025. Jansen had previously appeared in two separate roles on Neighbours, including Erin Salisbury between 2011 and 2012. Elle's return was confirmed by the Neighbours social media profiles on 7 July, with the announcement revealing that Jansen would appear in the role up to the finale.

== Storylines ==
Elle is born off-screen to mother Gail Robinson (Fiona Corke), a fraternal triplet along with identical brothers Cameron and Robert. Gail divorces Elle's father Paul whilst pregnant, and moves to Tasmania where she raises the children. It is inferred that Paul pays them occasional visits during Elle's youth. A year after Paul's return to Erinsborough, Elle lies to Gail about going to visit a friend in Byron Bay when in fact she heads for Erinsborough to see Paul. Elle begins to lace Izzy Hoyland's (Natalie Bassingthwaighte) food with drugs, in order to make her appear insane. Along with a number of Ramsay Street residents, Elle is involved the Lassiter's plane crash during a joyflight to Tasmania. She survives. Elle starts a relationship with Ned, which ends when he falls in love with Izzy. Dylan Timmins (Damien Bodie) and Elle start a relationship. Sky reveals she is pregnant with Dylan's child. Elle fears he will reunite with Sky. Elle concocts a lie that she had been diagnosed with a terminal illness. Dylan chose to stick by her. However, the news spreads that Elle is sick and she receives well-wishes from fooled neighbours. Cameron dies after being hit by a car. Elle tells Dylan the truth, he leaves her for Sky.

Elle begins playing tricks on Max Hoyland (Stephen Lovatt) who is responsible for Cameron's death, rearranging his cupboards and stealing his car. After stealing his car, Elle discovers that Max has hired an investigator to try to catch Elle. She deceives him into making a fake report. After the report was produced Max has a nervous breakdown, he commits himself to a hospital, then leaves Erinsborough. Elle feels guilty and unsuccessfully tries to cheer up the Hoylands, after Loris Timmins (Kate Fitzpatrick) invests in Lassiter's Hotel, Dylan tries to be spiteful by ruining her future plans for Lassiter's, but this throws them back into each other's arms. Elle becomes annoyed by Boyd Hoyland (Kyal Marsh) and Stephanie Scully (Carla Bonner) no longer wanting anything to do with her after they find out about her games. Elle sees Max in a shopping mall car park, with a woman and her children. After telling Janae Timmins (Eliza Taylor-Cotter), she goes to see him and he returns to Ramsay Street for a couple of months.

When Paul tricks residents of Ramsay Street into believing Dylan and Carmella Cammeniti (Natalie Blair) slept together, Elle ends her relationship with Dylan. Elle then schemes with Oliver Barnes (David Hoflin) to take control of Lassiter's. They succeed. Paul is diagnosed with a brain tumor and Elle takes him back in when he recovers. Oliver and Elle get together, and she helps him search for his biological mother. Elle quits Lassiters and signs 25% to Paul and 24% to Oliver. She begins a career as a journalist. Elle and Riley Parker (Sweeney Young) develop feeling towards each other, nothing develops. They are both trapped in a warehouse roof collapse. Surviving, Elle suffers post traumatic stress. Riley and Paul try to help her but she pushes them away. Elle and Marco Silvani (Jesse Rosenfeld) pair up in a joint business to run the General Store. Whilst reporting on Pete Ferguson (Kristin Holland) with Susan Kennedy (Jackie Woodburne), the pair are kidnapped and held hostage by Ferguson. They escape unharmed, but it worsens her stress.

Elle becomes the guardian of Donna Freedman (Margot Robbie). She starts a relationship with Lucas, then with Andrew Simpson (Peter Flanigan) to make him jealous, later reconciling with Lucas. Elle and Lucas become engaged, Elle finds out Lucas has a gambling addiction so she cunningly arranges his stag night at a casino. Elle breaks off their engagement fearing his gambling addiction will worsen. Elle and Lucas discover Paul has a secret sister Jill Ramsay (Perri Cummings); Paul said he already knew about her and told Elle to drop this. Paul finds out that Jill dies after being hit by a car; Paul denies involvement, he is arrested, later cleared. Elle quits her job as a journalist at the Erinsborough News after she disagrees with the way her father is running stories on the Kennedys' surrogacy. Elle is then offered a job with The New York Times, but she turns it down. Josh Burns (Scott Brennan), a former boss of Elle's dies, which prompts her to write one of her best articles. Lucas accepts the New York job on her behalf and Elle leaves. Lucas later receives a video message from Elle, who tells him their relationship would not have worked out.

In the buildup to Paul's wedding to Terese Willis, his former wives turn up in Erinsborough and try to convince Terese not to go through with the marriage. While the couple are in Queensland, Paul meets his former wife Christina Alessi (Gayle Blakeney) and her sister Caroline Alessi (Gillian Blakeney), who reveals that someone he knows is behind the plan. Elle then receives a video call from Paul, who demands to know why she would do that to him. Elle explains that after learning of his engagement to Terese, she wanted to test him and get him to think about how he treated his former wives, but she never told them to break him and Terese up. She also reveals that she was working with her half-brother, Leo Tanaka (Tim Kano). Three years later, Elle and her siblings video call Paul to cheer him up during the sale of Lassiter's. They suggest that Paul, Leo and David Tanaka (Takaya Honda) move to New York to be with the rest of the family.

== Reception ==
In 2006 Black was nominated for Most Popular New Female Talent in her role of Elle at the Logie awards. She was also nominated for Best Actress at Cosmopolitan's Fun, Fearless Female awards in 2009. Ruth Deller of entertainment website Lowculture commented on Elle branding her a "fierce businesswoman and journalist". She also stated that Elle was the most notable 'victim' of character ageing in soap opera because fellow Neighbours character Sky Mangel was born before her remained younger than her. In a separate feature Deller credited Elle as one of the best soap opera characters in the whole 2000's, stating: "Elle is one of the best characters on Neighbours in the past decade. Feisty, cutting, bitchy, but with a heart underneath, she also hates Libby, which we approve of. Plus the scenes with her and Susan becoming frenemies recently were good value. Long may she reign." When Elle took revenge on Lucas using his gambling addiction, Metro.co.uk likened Elle to her father Paul, branding her "a chip off the old block", also stating it as a cruel way to get revenge.

Columnists for the Daily Record have regularly analysed Elle's storylines. Through her revenge campaign on Max they said she proved "herself once again to be a chip off the old Robinson block". One perceived the whole "will-they won't-they" storyline between Elle and Oliver to be "tiresome" and "nonsense" and their later affair was deemed predictable. While another said that the start of her relationship with Lucas was more epic than "Doctor Zhivago, Romeo and Juliet or The Thorn Birds". They said it was a silly storyline because they were "clearly mad for each other" yet "too stubborn to let each other know it". They later stated that it would have been easier if Lucas told Elle the truth more often. However; they opined that there was no need for Elle to be jealous of Lucas and Steph's friendship. They observed Elle as spending most of her days "wandering around looking like a wounded puppy" and said she should get over herself. As Elle is involved in different building disasters they said she has the "kiss of death". They quipped "If there's one thing you really must never do in soapland, it's enter a dodgy building with Elle Robinson. That's because before you know it, some disaster will have struck, and it's likely you'll be left fighting for your life because of it." Upon Elle's final scenes, they said that viewers could expect "plenty of tears" when Elle makes her departure and leave Lucas behind. Inside Soap asked their readers whether Oliver should be with Elle or Carmella. Elle was voted their second best with only thirty-four percent of the vote. Katie Baillie writing for Metro included Elle on a list of the "worst Neighbours characters" ever. Baillie stated that Elle's inclusion owed to her "annoying" status as a scheming Robinson and her pouting.
