= List of Neighbours characters introduced in 2004 =

Neighbours is an Australian television soap opera. It was first broadcast on 18 March 1985. The following is a list of characters that appeared in the show in 2004, by order of first appearance. All characters were introduced by the shows executive producer Ric Pellizzeri. The 20th season of Neighbours began airing from 19 January 2004. Svetlanka Ristic the mother of Liljana Bishop made her debut in February, and her grandson, Luka Dokich arrived later on in September. Ben Barrack also joined the cast as Gus Cleary in February and the following month saw a new police officer arrive in the form of Allan Steiger. The first two members of the Timmins family, Stingray and Janelle, arrived in March and November respectively. Joe Scully's brother Tom made his first appearance in May. Corrupt cop, Olivia McPherson made her debut in June. Neighbours' first on-going lesbian character, Lana Crawford joined in August and the following month saw Roger Neave join the cast as psychiatrist Jeremy Levi. Carmella Cammeniti's mother, Lucia, made her debut in November.

== Svetlanka Ristic ==
Svetlanka Ristic
- Neighbours character
- Portrayed by: Deidre Rubenstein
- First appearance: 13 February 2004
- Last appearance: 28 October 2004
- Introduced by: Ric Pellizzeri
In-universe information
- Occupation: Vineyard Owner
- Husband: Miroslav Ristic
- Sons: Zoran Ristic
- Daughters: Liljana Bishop
- Grandsons: Luka Dokich
- Granddaughters: Serena Bishop

Svetlanka Ristic, played by Deidre Rubenstein, is Liljana Bishop's mother. She made her first on-screen appearance on 13 February 2004. The Sunday Mail described Svetlanka as "conniving".

Svetlanka is the strict mother of Zoran and Liljana (Marcella Russo). She and her husband ran a vineyard in Perth. Svetlanka finds it difficult when Liljana and her family move across the country to Melbourne. She comes to Erinsborough to visit Liljana and believes that the family are doing well, but she soon discovers that David (Kevin Harrington) is having financial problems. Svetlanka also discovers that Serena (Lara Sacher) was modelling for dodgy photographer Chris Cousens (Simon Mallory) to help raise money. Svetlanka tries to emotionally blackmail Liljana into returning to Perth, but Liljana tells her that she and her family are settled. Svetlanka tries to buy Serena's favour with money and she later fakes heart problems. Liljana is not fooled and asks her mother to leave. Svetlanka threatens to reveal a secret of Liljana's and she later announces that Liljana had been pregnant when she met David. David stands by his wife and Svetlanka leaves. Liljana reveals to David and Serena that shortly after meeting him, she gave birth to still born baby, that Svetlanks took away before she got to see it. Serena stays in contact with her grandmother and Svetlanka returns a few months later.

Svetlanka stays at Lassiter's Hotel and she is eventually spotted by Harold Bishop (Ian Smith). She announces that she wants to give the family $100,000 and she is pleased when it divides Liljana and David, as David wants to take it. Svetlanka grows close to Harold and they share a kiss one night after dinner. David tells Svetlanka that they will accept the money only if she leaves straight away. She decides to give them the money, but Liljana tells her that they will be returning it. Liljana invites Svetlanka to a goodbye dinner, but she Liljana starts telling everyone how she disgraced her family by becoming pregnant as a teenager. Svetlanka and Liljana make up, but Svetlanka is horrified when she sees Luka Dokich (Keelan O'Hehir) talking to Serena in the Coffee Shop. Svetlanka tries to prevent the growing relationship between Serena and Luka. Luka tells her that he has arrived to search for his biological parents and is hoping that Svetlanka can help.

Svetlanka tries to convince Luka that he is not adopted, but he does not listen to her. Luka tells her that he will leave, but he hides in a shed with only Serena knowing he is there. Svetlanka follows Serena and ends up slapping her when she sees Luka is still around. Liljana is taken to hospital with liver failure and Svetlanka confesses to Karl Kennedy (Alan Fletcher) that Luka is Liljana's son and he is a match. Svetlanka warns Serena to stay away from Luka and tells her that they are related. Serena reveals the truth to everyone and Harold tells Svetlanka that her family would not abandon her. However, Liljana tells her mother that she does not want to see her again and Svetlanka makes plans to return to Perth. Harold and Svetlanka find a little boy who has run away from home and Svetlanka helps him reunite with his mother. Svetlanka asks Harold to join her, but she later decides to leave alone. When news of the deaths of David, Liljana and Serena during a plane crash reaches Svetlanka, she is unable to attend the funeral as she is heavily sedated due to her grief.

== Gus Cleary ==
Gus Cleary
- Neighbours character
- Portrayed by: Ben Barrack
- Duration: 2004, 2007, 2014
- First appearance: 17 February 2004
- Last appearance: 9 June 2014
- Introduced by: Ric Pellizzeri
In-universe information
- Occupation: Oil Rig Worker; Barman
- Brothers: Victor Cleary
- Sisters: Laura Davidson

Gus Cleary, played by Ben Barrack, made his first on-screen appearance on 17 February 2004. Gus was a friend of Max Hoyland and came to stay with him. He was later murdered by Paul Robinson during the Lassiter's fire.

Barrack went to two auditions for Gus and four days after the second one, he was given the role. Barrack said that his character is "clearly a pretty mixed up fella", but believes that people felt some empathy for him. He said that he researched schizophrenia and thought about things that happened in Gus' life which may have led to him acting the way he did. He believed that Gus was "almost childlike in his need to be liked and accepted."

Gus comes from a privileged background and is forced to accept a job on one of his father's oil rigs when he uses up all of his chances. Gus' inability to do his job almost causes a major oil spill and Max Hoyland (Stephen Lovatt), his supervisor, fires him. Years later, Gus arrives in Erinsborough, where Max and his family had settled down. Gus takes a look around Max's house when it is put up for auction by its owner and steals a photo. He then meets up with Max and tells him that there are no hard feelings between them. However, on the day of the auction Gus hides in the house and places his own bids by phone, which forces Max to bid over his limit. Max helps Gus find some work at Lou's Place and Gus also starts dating Izzy Hoyland (Natalie Bassingthwaighte), despite the fact that she feels unsettled by Gus' possessiveness. Gus continues with his manipulation of the Hoyland family, by talking to Boyd (Kyal Marsh) about his girlfriend and buying Steph (Carla Bonner) a model motorbike. Gus also rescues Summer (Marisa Siketa) after she gets stuck in a bad part of town. Gus slips sedative into Max's drink just before he drives Steph to the hospital. Max just manages to avoid an accident and puts it down to too many beers at lunch. Max injures his back and Gus spends his time at the Hoyland's looking after him.

Gus continues to give Max sedatives, but he tries to cover his tracks when Max goes to the hospital for tests, and the sedatives are found in his blood. Karl Kennedy (Alan Fletcher) looks into Gus' past and finds that he was sent to a mental hospital. Max asks Gus to leave, but he returns to say goodbye to Summer and Boyd fights with him. Gus breaks in and hides in the roof, only coming out to do the housework. He is discovered and Max chases him to a building site, they both fight in the rafters of a house and they fall. Gus then disappears. Gus discovers that Izzy is pregnant and he tries to speak to her, but Karl sees them and calls the police. Gus is taken away to a mental hospital and Izzy tells him that the baby is not his. Gus is then transferred to a Perth hospital. He appears months later at Izzy's wedding to Karl. He tells Izzy that she should be with him and she tells him that she lost the baby. Gus kisses her and leaves, he goes to Ramsay Street and Max tries to win his trust. Stuart Parker (Blair McDonough) appears and Gus runs off. That evening, a fire destroys the Lassiter's complex and a burnt body is discovered. It is identified as Gus and tests reveal that he did not die in the fire, he received a blow to the head. In 2007 and 2014, Gus is seen in flashbacks after Paul Robinson confesses to killing Gus.

== Allan Steiger ==
Allan Steiger
- Neighbours character
- Portrayed by: Joe Clements
- Duration: 2004–2007
- First appearance: 4 March 2004
- Last appearance: 13 July 2007
- Introduced by: Ric Pellizzeri
In-universe information
- Occupation: Police Sergeant; Self-defence instructor
- Wife: Christine Rodd (until 2005); Janelle Timmins (2007–)
- Daughters: Pepper Steiger
- Stepsons: Dylan Timmins; Stingray Timmins
- Stepdaughters: Janae Timmins; Bree Timmins; Anne Baxter

Senior Sergeant Allan Steiger, played by Joe Clements, made his first appearance on 4 March 2004. The character's role in the show increased when producers introduced his daughter Pepper Steiger (Nicky Whelan) to the main cast, and he became a love interest for Janelle Timmins (Nell Feeney). Janelle was known for being unlucky in love, and Feeney commented that Steiger would come in and woo her character. She thought it was about time Janelle had a good romance, but she was unsure at the time if it would be ongoing. Of the couple, she stated "I don't like to say too much. But it seems to work well. He comes in and puts a controlling hand on Janelle, but it doesn't pull her down too much." A TV Week columnist thought Steiger "may get more than he bargained for" with his new romance.

Stuart Parker (Blair McDonough) clashes with Allan, shortly after he joins the police force training team. Allan feels that Stuart is not taking the job seriously and he looks in his file and sees that Stuart has trouble sticking with a job. When Stuart fails an exercise, Allan tells him to buck up his ideas if he wants to join the force. Stuart snaps and knocks Allan to the ground. Allan later tells him that if he returns the next day, then they can forget that ever happened. Allan begins self-defence classes for the Erinsborough women and Lyn Scully (Janet Andrewartha), Susan Kennedy (Jackie Woodburne) and Liljana Bishop (Marcella Russo) sign up. Liljana enjoys Allan's attention and she wears a skimpy outfit to the classes. Allan likes Liljana and believes she is interested in him, but she turns down his offer to go to the coast. Allan is promoted to Senior Sergeant and his first investigation is the Lassiter's complex fire and the murder of Gus Cleary (Ben Barrack). Allan offers Stuart a desk job when his sight is damaged in the fire. Allan investigates numerous crimes in the area, including David Bishop's (Kevin Harrington) being framed for fraud. He helps Stuart and allows him to take some time off when his wife is taken to a mental hospital.

Allan sends Stuart undercover at a prison to help out Dylan (Damien Bodie) and Stingray Timmins (Ben Nicholas) and later tries to arrest their father at his wedding to Janelle Timmins. When Paul Robinson (Stefan Dennis) is targeted by a stalker, Allan leads the investigation. Robert Robinson (Adam Hunter) is discovered to be the stalker and Paul arranges a fake wedding with Gail Robinson (Fiona Corke), with Allan waiting in the crowd. Robert shoots Paul and is arrested. Allan's daughter, Pepper Steiger moves into Ramsay Street and Allan is surprised when she tells him that she is engaged to Frazer Yeats (Ben Lawson). Allan and Pepper rescue Janae Timmins (Eliza Taylor-Cotter) from Rex Colt (David Serafin), who had locked her in his office. Pepper decides to reunite her parents and Allan is also keen to get back with his ex-wife, Christine Rodd (Trudy Hellier). Christine tells Allan and Pepper that she is a lesbian and while Pepper takes the news badly, Allan goes to the Scarlet Bar to play darts. He meets Janelle and she later asks him on a date.

Janelle and Allan decide to go shoot pigs and go camping. During the trip Allan arrests Katya Kinski (Dichen Lachman), which disgusts Janelle. She tries to leave, but changes her mind and she and Allan begin a relationship. Stingray dies and Dylan leaves town, which devastates Janelle. Allan helps her through her grief and she later asks him to move in with her. Pepper tells her father that she is being stalked and she reveals to him that she fell pregnant to her high school boyfriend and later suffered a miscarriage. Allan arrests Kevin Casey (Zen Ledden), but later discovers that his mother is stalking Pepper. Allan accepts a job in the Solomon Islands and tells Janelle that when he returns he will propose. Allan contracts malaria and he returns home. Allan suggests that the Timmins family move up north to allow Janelle to be closer to Dylan and Anne Baxter (Tessa James). Allan proposes to Janelle and they get married at their farewell party. The family then leave in a helicopter.

== Stingray Timmins ==
Stingray Timmins, played by Ben Nicholas, made his first on-screen appearance on 11 March 2004. Stingray is the youngest son of Janelle (Nell Feeney) and Kim Timmins (Brett Swain). Nicholas successfully auditioned for the role of Stingray and began filming his scenes three days after getting the call to say he had won the part. Of joining the soap, Nicholas said "It's a dream come true".

== Tom Scully ==
Tom Scully
- Neighbours character
- Portrayed by: Andrew Larkins
- Duration: 2004, 2007
- First appearance: 5 May 2004
- Last appearance: 18 May 2007
- Introduced by: Ric Pellizzeri
In-universe information
- Occupation: Catholic Priest; Courier; Principal of Erinsborough High
- Father: Pat Scully
- Brothers: Joe Scully; Mick Scully
- Nephews: Jack Scully; Oscar Scully
- Nieces: Stephanie Scully; Felicity Scully; Michelle Scully
- Other relatives: Charlie Hoyland

Tom Scully, played by Andrew Larkins, made his first appearance on 5 May 2004. Tom was introduced as Joe Scully's (Shane Connor) younger brother and a potential love interest for Susan Kennedy (Jackie Woodburne). He was also a Catholic priest. Tom and Susan are involved in a scandal when they begin a relationship. Television critic Andrew Mercado said that 2004 went down as "a watershed year for controversy" after Susan had sex with Tom. Of her character's relationship with Tom, Woodburne said "They once had a very hot affair – he even left the priesthood for her – but they both felt it wasn't meant to be." Larkins reprised the role in 2007, as Tom becomes the Principal of Erinsborough High. He also tells Susan that he never stopped loving her and wants her back.

When Tom is transferred to St Joseph's church in Erinsborough, he finds himself living a few streets away from his brother Joe Scully and his wife Lyn Scully (Janet Andrewartha), who he once had feelings for. Tom makes friends with the neighbours and Susan Kennedy asks him out. However, he has to turn her down and she later finds out that he is a priest. Tom and Susan begin to spend a lot of time together, which leaves Lyn jealous and concerned that Tom was going break his vow of celibacy. Tom and Susan find that they have many things in common and they confide in each other. When Susan makes a joke that she could not be celibate herself, Tom walks out on her. Lyn tries to prevent Susan and Tom from spending time together and Tom notices. He confronts her and she tells him that her feelings for him are making her uncomfortable. Susan and Tom share a kiss and his feelings for her cause him to tell her that he needs to spend some time alone.

Tom is visited by a young woman who tells him that she is pregnant and that she told her partner that he is the father, when he is not. Tom encourages her to own up. Tom decides to leave the church for Susan, leaving Lyn appalled. Tom and Susan bump into Susan's ex-husband, Karl Kennedy (Alan Fletcher) and his girlfriend, Izzy Hoyland (Natalie Bassingthwaighte). Tom recognises Izzy as she is the woman who had confessed to him. Izzy later begs Tom not to tell Karl or Susan about her baby. Tom agrees and tells her to tell Karl herself, which Izzy agrees to. Tom struggles to find work outside of the church, but he eventually becomes a courier. Susan and Tom are happy until Susan realises that Tom's views are causing problems within her household. Tom realises that Karl has no idea that he is not the father of Izzy's baby and he tells Izzy to tell him or he will. Susan finds Tom at the church asking God for answers and she tells him that they cannot relate to each other. Tom decides to leave town and heads to Bendigo.

Tom decides to use his teaching qualifications that he earned and begins teaching at a small school. Tom applies for the position of Principal at Erinsborough High and he returns to Erinsborough as Susan's boss. Tom is shocked that Susan has reunited with Karl and the atmosphere at the school becomes awkward. Susan struggles with Tom's modern teaching methods and Tom tells her that he would be happy to accept her resignation, they later become friends. Karl is shocked to find Tom has returned and he becomes convinced that he and Susan are together. Karl confronts Tom, who tells him that he does not deserve Susan. Karl realises that Tom does not know Susan that well and is not threat to his marriage. Susan asks to meet Tom and she tells him that she loves Karl and many of the students turn on Tom for trying to come between Karl and Susan. Tom decides to resign and he tells Susan that he is going to Ireland to see some relatives.

== Olivia McPherson ==
Olivia McPherson
- Neighbours character
- Portrayed by: Sylvie de Crespigny
- First appearance: 3 June 2004
- Last appearance: 8 September 2004
- Introduced by: Ric Pellizzeri
In-universe information
- Occupation: Police Officer

Olivia "Mac" McPherson, played by Sylvie de Crespigny, made her first on-screen appearance on 3 June 2004. Olivia is a police officer who dates both Jack Scully and Stuart Parker.

de Crespigny Said she jumped at the chance to play the "mysterious" Olivia. The role was her first television job and she said that it was "brilliant" and that the cast had been very welcoming towards her. de Crespigny described Olivia as a "feisty young lady" and said "She's a party girl, but she has a life that she likes to keep split. She likes to shake things up a little bit." de Crespigny added that she is not similar to her character and clubbing is not her forte, but she does enjoy going out and having fun.

Olivia is the third generation of her family, after her father and grandfather, to become a police officer. She eventually becomes a senior constable, but she starts going out clubbing every night and taking drugs. Olivia becomes corrupt and helps rob building sites in order to fund her nights out. She meets Jack Scully (Jay Bunyan) at a club and they start spending a lot of time together. She makes sure that he only knows her by her nickname, Mac, and they eventually start dating. Olivia and Jack are involved in a small car crash on their way home from a night out. When the police arrive, Olivia tells Jack to leave as the police officers would probably recognise her. Olivia is partnered with Stuart Parker (Blair McDonough) and Stuart develops a crush on her. When he makes a mistake in his log book, Olivia covers for him. Stuart becomes suspicious of Olivia when he sees her taking something from a known criminal. Jack turns to Olivia when the site he is working on is robbed. She lends him some money and tells him that there is no hurry to pay it back. However, she suddenly demands the money back from Jack and almost runs over Summer Hoyland (Marisa Siketa). Olivia goes back to her ways and starts taking drugs again. Jack refuses to go to a club with her and she turns nasty. When Olivia is unable to get her hands on any money, she suggests to Jack that they stage a robbery at his site. When Stuart questions Jack, Olivia's cover is blown and Jack is shocked to find out that she is policeman. Olivia discovers that Darren Stark (Todd MacDonald) has a criminal record and decides to pin the robbery on him, but Darren has a strong alibi. Olivia and Stuart attend a Police Ball together and when Jack loses control of his car while on the phone to her, she ends their relationship. Olivia decides to turn over a new leaf and she and Stuart sleep together. She then tells him everything and he decides to report her for her actions. Olivia says goodbye to Jack and tells Stuart that he will make a great police officer.

The BBC said Olivia's most notable moment was "Being revealed as Stuart's partner in the Police as well as Jack's mystery woman."

== Lana Crawford ==
Lana Crawford, played by Bridget Neval, made her first appearance on 31 August 2004. Lana was introduced as Neighbours' first openly lesbian character and she shared the show's first on-screen lesbian kiss with Sky Mangel (Stephanie McIntosh). Lana is Sindi Watts' (Marisa Warrington) cousin.

== Luka Dokich ==
Luka Dokich
- Neighbours character
- Portrayed by: Keelan O'Hehir
- First appearance: 14 September 2004
- Last appearance: 19 November 2004
- Introduced by: Ric Pellizzeri
In-universe information
- Father: Ivan Petrovic
- Mother: Liljana Bishop
- Adoptive mother: Anna Dokich
- Stepfather: David Bishop
- Half-sisters: Serena Bishop
- Grandfathers: Miroslav Ristic
- Grandmothers: Svetlanka Ristic
- Uncles: Zoran Ristic

Luka Dokich, played by Keelan O'Hehir, made his first on-screen appearance on 14 September 2004. Luka is Liljana Bishop's son, who was adopted at birth. Luka comes to Erinsborough to meet up with his grandmother and ends up meeting his real mother and half sister.

Model O'Hehir received the script to audition for Neighbours through his agency. O'Hehir described his character's connection with Serena Bishop (Lara Sacher) as "instant". He said "There's a really amazing chemistry between them." O'Hehir explained that Luka's upbringing has not been easy and that he has been through "a lot of stuff". He added "He's had this inkling his whole life that something is not and his confusion comes through in his behaviour." Luka later begins an incestuous relationship with his half-sister, Serena. They are unaware that they share the same mother. This was the second time Neighbours had depicted an incest storyline.

Luka is the product of a brief relationship between a teenage Liljana Ristic (Marcella Russo) and Ivan Petrovic. Liljana's mother, Svetlanka (Deidre Rubenstein), gives Luka to the Dokich family and pays a doctor to tell Liljana that her baby is dead, so she can save her family from any embarrassment. Svetlanka becomes Luka's godmother. Luka feels out of place within his family and becomes convinced that he is adopted. After he becomes obsessed with a female teacher and she ignores him, Luka sets fire to her bag and it spreads to the school. Svetlanka provides him with a false alibi when he turns to her for help. Luka goes to Erinsborough to find Svetlanka and she tells him that he is not adopted and that he should go home. Luka begins to develop a relationship with Serena Bishop. Svetlanka tells Luka that she spoke to a nurse from the hospital where he was born, and she confirms that he is not adopted. Luka does not believe her and he hides in an old storage shed, with Serena being the only person who knows he is there.

Luka and Serena grow closer and he tells her about the fire he started. Serena later decides that she wants to lose her virginity to Luka, but before she does, she receives a call telling her that her mother, Liljana, was in hospital. Liljana requires a liver transplant and Svetlanka tells Karl Kennedy (Alan Fletcher) that Luka could save Liljana. Svetlanka tells the rest of the family that Luka may have the same blood. Sky Mangel (Stephanie McIntosh) uses a radio to put out a call for Luka and he hears the message and goes to the hospital. Luka is a match and he is taken into surgery. Svetlanka sees Serena and Luka together and tells Serena the truth about her half-brother. Just as Luka goes to leave town, Serena blurts out that Liljana is his mother in front of her family.

Luka is happy that he has found his mother, but Liljana struggles to find any feelings for him. Luka and Serena become friends and Liljana and Luka get to know each other. Liljana's husband, David (Kevin Harrington), finds the situation difficult and Serena finds it hard to share her mother with Luka. Liljana invites Luka to move in with them, but David tells Liljana that Luka cannot be trusted. Luka wants to find his real father, but he discovers that Ivan had died. When he hears Liljana tell David that she did not love Ivan, Luka takes David's suitcase and burns it. Serena confronts Luka when the suitcase is returned and eventually persuades Luka to return to Perth and get some help. Liljana tells him that she loves him and he leaves.

== Jeremy Levi ==
Jeremy Levi
- Neighbours character
- Portrayed by: Roger Neave
- Duration: 2004–2009
- First appearance: 21 September 2004
- Last appearance: 17 June 2009
- Introduced by: Ric Pellizzeri
In-universe information
- Occupation: Psychiatrist

Jeremy Levi, played by Roger Neave, made his first screen appearance on 21 September 2004. Jeremy was a Psychiatrist at Erinsborough Hospital.

After Izzy Hoyland (Natalie Bassingthwaighte) begins suffering from nightmares, her partner, Karl Kennedy (Alan Fletcher), decides to send her to a psychiatrist. Izzy is reluctant at first, but once she meets Jeremy she changes her mind. They talk about her childhood and Izzy enjoys the sessions. Karl begins to resent her spending time with Jeremy and becomes jealous when he sees a young, attractive man going into Jeremy's office. Izzy later realises that Karl has mistaken a paediatrician who shares Jeremy's office for Jeremy. Izzy's nephew, Boyd (Kyal Marsh), visits Jeremy the following year when he suffers a breakdown and is referred by Karl. Jeremy diagnosis adolescent schizophrenia, which he says is treatable. However, it is later discovered that Boyd has a brain tumour. Sindi Watts (Marisa Warrington) is admitted to the psychiatric ward with paranoid delusions and Jeremy tells her that her husband, Stuart Parker's (Blair McDonough), constant visits are making her condition worse. She later transfers to another hospital. Months later Jeremy assesses Stephanie Scully (Carla Bonner) after she is declared mentally incompetent. Stuart arrests her and she is forced to undergo a seventy-two-hour involuntary assessment with Jeremy. He finds that her mental health is fine and she is released.

Jeremy helps to treat his colleague Karl, who is having sleeping problems. Jeremy tells Karl about a sleeping liquid that can help get him back into a regular sleep pattern. Paul Robinson (Stefan Dennis) visits Jeremy following his memory loss from brain surgery. Jeremy uses hypnotherapy to help Paul and he discovers that he started the Lassiter's complex fire and killed Gus Cleary (Ben Barrack). Gus' sister and her boyfriend kidnap the son of Paul's girlfriend, Declan Napier (James Sorensen) and when he is released, he attends a session with Jeremy. The following year, Jeremy diagnoses Nicola West (Imogen Bailey) with paranoia and delusions, after she tries to kill her brother in law and believes she is Miranda Parker (Nikki Coghill). He has Nicola transferred to a secure unit in West Waratah. Months later Zeke Kinski (Matthew Werkmeister) is taken to Jeremy after he reunited with his family following a rafting accident. Zeke is unable to remember anything of his family and Jeremy explains that he is suffering from a Fugue state. Jeremy tells Karl that Zeke will eventually recover, but it could take months. A few weeks later, Jeremy assesses Miranda after she is arrested under the Mental Health Act when she snatches a baby. Jeremy questions Miranda, but discharges her. The Kennedy family undergo a psychological assessment with Jeremy when they want to go through a surrogacy program. Jeremy agrees that everything can go ahead.

== Lucia Cammeniti ==
Lucia Cammeniti
- Neighbours character
- Portrayed by: Maria Mercedes
- Duration: 2004–2005, 2007
- First appearance: 2 November 2004
- Last appearance: 6 September 2007
- Introduced by: Ric Pellizzeri
In-universe information
- Occupation: Businesswoman
- Husband: Rocco Cammeniti (divorced)
- Daughters: Rosetta Cammeniti; Rosaria Cammeniti; Carmella Cammeniti
- Grandsons: Marco Yeats
- Granddaughters: Chloe Cammeniti

Lucia Cammeniti, played by Maria Mercedes, made her first appearance on 2 November 2004. Writers for TV Week confirmed that Mercedes would continue to appear in 2005, after "a brief glimpse" at the end of 2004. Lucia is the "strong-willed and extremely independent mother" of Carmella Cammeniti (Natalie Blair). With her husband Rocco Cammeniti (Robert Forza) in prison, Lucia takes over the family businesses. Mercedes reprised the role in October 2006 for an extended guest stint. Lucia is described as a "domineering" and "interfering" mother. She arrives to make sure her eldest daughter, Rosetta Cammeniti (Natalie Saleeba), goes through with her prearranged marriage.

Lucia is the wife of Rocco Cammeniti (Robert Forza) and is used to getting her own way. When Rocco is sent to prison, Lucia takes control of the family businesses. She makes her daughter, Carmella Cammeniti (Natalie Blair), return home from school in order to take over as editor of All Her magazine. Carmella reunites with Connor O'Neill (Patrick Harvey) and Lucia meets with him. When Lucia discovers that Connor has a daughter and that he and Carmella want to move in together, she makes a secret pact with him to challenge his worth. Lucia challenges him to turn $500 into $1000 overnight and to take a suitcase with sensitive information in to the family solicitor. Lucia tells Connor that he has passed and she backs off.

Lucia returns to Ramsay Street to deal with her daughter Rosetta's love life after she turns her back on Carmella. Lucia demands to know why Rosetta turned down Johnny Brown (Lawrence Price), the man she had found for Rosetta to marry. Lucia tells her daughter that she will not find a man on her own and Rosetta agrees to move back home and marry Johnny. However, her housemates talk her out of it and she tells Lucia that she will not move back home. Frazer Yeats (Ben Lawson) finds Lucia and offers to keep her updated on Rosetta's life, if she makes it worth his while. Frazer is revealed to be Johnny's brother and he eventually falls for Rosetta and tells her about his deal with Lucia. Lucia returns to be introduced to her daughter's fiancée and she is shocked to find that Frazer is in a wheelchair, following an accident. Lucia tries to talk Rosetta out of marrying Frazer, but when she sees that Rosetta and Frazer are serious, she brings her aunts to Ramsay Street to plan the wedding. Frazer tells Lucia off and she is impressed. Lucia then announces that she will pay for the wedding.

Lucia is not happy that Rocco has been released from prison for the wedding and she warns him that she will kill him if anything goes wrong. A couple of weeks later, Lucia comes to see Rosetta and discovers that Carmella is pregnant. Lucia encourages Carmella to win back the baby's father, Oliver Barnes (David Hoflin) from his girlfriend. Lucia tells Oliver that Carmella has feelings for him and reminds him that the baby might call someone else dad if he does not reunite with her daughter. Lucia arranges a lunch and uses the event to remind Carmella that it would be good if the baby is born into a stable, loving relationship. Carmella then tells her mother that she has moved on from Oliver.

== Janelle Timmins ==
Janelle Timmins, played by Nell Feeney, is the matriarch of the Timmins family. She is the mother of Dylan (Damien Bodie), Stingray (Ben Nicholas), Janae (Eliza Taylor-Cotter) and Bree Timmins (Sianoa Smit-McPhee). She made her first on-screen appearance on 11 November 2004. Janelle is a "bit of a bogan, a very down-to-earth country woman."

== Others ==
Date(s)	Character	Actor	Circumstances
23 January 2004–30 July 2007	Stanford Mundy	Michael Quinn	Stanford is a surgeon at Erinsborough Hospital and Karl Kennedy's colleague. He and his wife, Mandy, are invited to dinner at Karl's apartment with Karl and his girlfriend, Izzy Hoyland. Stanford interviews Boyd Hoyland, but is unimpressed with his lateness. However, he changes his mind once Boyd explains the circumstances. Stanford conducts a paternity test for Paul Robinson and Oliver Barnes and reveals that they are not related.
4 April	Ryan Swan	Patrick Williams	Ryan and his father John are served by Sky Mangel in the coffee shop. They converse with Sky and mention they are heading to a local lake on the first day of Duck Hunting Season. Sky realises John is the man who killed her mother Kerry Bishop fourteen years earlier during a protest and attacks him. John mentions that he takes Ryan every year to the place of Kerry's death to reflect and has since given up hunting.
6 April	Sally Jeffries	Isabella Stephenson	Sally is the younger sister of Lisa Jeffries. When Sally celebrates her birthday, Gus Cleary is enlisted to perform as a clown at her party, but his act fails to impress Sally's guests.
13 April 2004–14 January 2005	Madeleine Lee	Madison Lu	Madeleine is the daughter of Lori Lee and Connor O'Neill. Madeleine is born in New Zealand and when Lori finds herself struggling to cope, she takes her to meet Connor. Connor struggles to bond with Madeleine at first, but he later relaxes. Lori moves to Lorne, but a few months later she leaves Madeleine with Connor for a few days. Madeleine is diagnosed with a serious ear infection, which requires an operation. Connor borrows some money and the operation takes place.
4 June 2004–2 February 2005	Krystal	Estelle Andrewartha	Krystal is a personal trainer who takes on David Bishop as a client. David ends the sessions with Krystal when his wife sees them together. Boyd Hoyland gets a job at the Fitness for Life gym where Krystal works and she convinces him to enter a bodybuilding championship. Krystal offers him some human growth hormones and Boyd begins taking them. Boyd realises that Krystal is using him and he quits the gym.
28 June–5 July	Therese Bray	Susan Turner	Therese works at the local Catholic church along with Tom Scully and takes several messages. After overhearing a conversation between Tom and Lyn Scully, where Tom tells Lyn of his feelings for Susan Kennedy, she resigns and packs her bags. Before leaving, she tells Susan she knows about her and Tom and tells her that she has been in the same position prior.
28 July 2004–25 February 2005	Caleb Wilson	Joss Kasper	While he is staying at a holiday resort, Caleb meets Summer Hoyland and they get on well. He gives her his details before he returns home and Summer eventually discovers that he is the son of a billionaire. Caleb and Summer exchange emails and he turns up in Erinsborough in a limo. Summer's friends do not believe that Caleb exists, until he arrives at her school on a scooter to pick Summer up. A few weeks later, Caleb sends Summer a letter telling her that he had met someone else. Caleb returns and he dates Summer for a few months until he starts putting pressure on her to take things further.
6, 13 September	Krishneel Nand	Curtis Fernandez	Nina Tucker's personal assistant. As they arrive in Ramsay Street, Krishneel warns Nina about deviating from the schedule, but she tells him that there is something she needs to do. A few days later, Nina asks Krishneel to get some extra suitcases for Jack Scully and to check him out of his room, as he will be staying with her.
13–14 September 2004, 7 December 2021–present	Rhonda Del Rubio	Rebekah Robertson	A lawyer representing Karl Kennedy in his divorce with Susan Kennedy. They attend a mediation session to discuss the Kennedy's assets, which turns into an argument when Susan's lawyer, Tim Collins believes the valuation of Karl's surgery is too low. As the group continue to argue, Karl's partner Izzy Hoyland enters the room and accuses Susan of trying to take everything from Karl, who then decides to leave with Izzy. The following day, Karl, Susan and their lawyers go to court to divide the assets. Rhonda argues that Karl is entitled to half of a trust fund set up by Susan's grandmother for the couple. Karl and Susan step into a private room and Rhonda comments that it is unwise, but the pair come to an agreement themselves. Years later, Paul Robinson and Terese Willis visit Rhonda for marriage counselling. Rhonda explains her role during the session and when Paul and Terese begin arguing, she suggests they do an exercise, but Terese leaves instead. The couple return a couple of months later and apologise to Rhonda for how they acted before. She asks them to focus on taking responsibility and to explain the dynamics of their relationship. She later asks Paul about his intense desire to protect his children and he opens up about how the death of his mother affected him growing up. Later, Rhonda counsels Terese and her new husband, Toadie Rebecchi, and stepdaughter, Nell Rebecchi. Nell opens up about the pain of losing her mother, Sonya. Toadie subsequently has further sessions with Rhonda, where they discuss his feelings around his ex-wives. When Terese interrupts one of their sessions, Toadie assumes that she is conspiring with Rhonda to arrange further joint sessions without his consent and shouts at both women before storming off. Subsequently, Holly Hoyland becomes Rhonda's client. Yasmine Shields breaks into Rhonda's office and accesses Holly's patient file. At Holly's session the following day, Rhonda notices her desk has been rearranged but attributes this to Craig Pallares, who shares her office. Rhonda affirms that Yaz should not be speaking aggressively to Holly, before Holly tells her of her continued sense of being overwhelmed by the dramatic events in her life.
15 September–19 October	Travis Dean	Adrian Foley	Travis threatens Boyd Hoyland to stay off his patch when Boyd gets a job putting up posters alongside him. Boyd is undeterred and continues, so Travis beats him up. The war escalates when Boyd fights back and punches Travis in the stomach and runs off. When Boyd's younger sister, Summer is threatened at school, he is forced to tell his father, Max. After someone else covers up Travis' posters, Travis retaliates by throwing a Molotov cocktail through the kitchen window of Number 32. No-one is injured, but Boyd swears revenge. He hides in the back of Travis' ute and makes a call to Constable Stuart Parker. Travis' Rottweiler, Satan discovers him and barks, alerting Travis. Boyd flees up a tree and Travis and his friends pelt a trapped Boyd with food until he falls and they begin fighting. Stuart arrives to break up the fight and arrests Travis after Boyd presents a recorded confession to the arson on his mobile phone. Travis blames Stuart for a bloody nose and puts forward an excessive force lawsuit against him and seeks legal advice from Toadfish Rebecchi. However, Toadie persuades Travis to drop the charges.
27 September–30 November	Brendan Bond	Michael Wahr	Brendan makes it known that he likes Lana Crawford when she transfers to Erinsborough High school. They begin dating and Lana makes sure the whole school is aware of their relationship. After rumours about Lana's sexuality are spread, Lana goes to a party with Brendan where he suggests that they have sex. At the last minute, Lana tells Brendan that she prefers girls and as she leaves, Brendan shouts abuse at her. The scenes of Brendan's homophobic taunts in the UK airing of episode 4593 received a complaint from a viewer, however, broadcast regulator Ofcom found the scene not to be in breach or out of remit.
7 October	Buffy Only	Laura Gordon	Buffy is the editor of the underground gay magazine, Leichen. She meets with Sky Mangel and Lana Crawford, when they submit their comic strip, Freak Girl and The Enigma. Buffy assumes Sky and Lana are romantic partners and Lana calls her to set the record straight. Buffy asks Lana out on a date. Sky tries to put Buffy off, but Lana calls Buffy back and they go out. Buffy and Lana realise that they do not have much in common and Buffy tells her to follow her heart and be happy.
17–29 November	Nick Sullivan	Angus Grant	Nick is Lori Lee's new partner. He frequently clashes with Connor O'Neill, the father of Lori's daughter, Madeleine. Nick mentions to Connor that he, Lori and Madeleine are moving to Adelaide and Connor takes Madeleine when Nick's back is turned. Lori is sympathetic and agrees to call off the move. Nick gives Lori an ultimatum about moving, but she ends her relationship with him and Nick leaves for Adelaide.
24 November 2004–1 February 2005	Doreen Cassidy	Anne Phelan	Doreen Cassidy is Charlie Cassidy's sister, she lives in a commune and goes by the name of "Peace Dove". Doreen meets up with Charlie and his wife, Valda Sheergold, while they are on their honeymoon and she accompanies Charlie to Erinsborough to see his daughter Lyn Scully. Doreen asks Charlie to tell Lyn about his state of poor health and Stephanie Scully overhears them. Doreen and Steph take Charlie to see his boat in his last days. Charlie dies and Doreen tries to make his son, Michael realise that he needs to let go of his guilt about losing touch with his father. Doreen leaves for Shelley Bay.
1 December 2004–12 January 2005	Georgina Harris	Adrienne Smith	When Georgina hears that Lana Crawford has come out as a lesbian, she leaves a note in her locker asking her to the school formal. Lana believes "George" is a guy and is confused, but she goes to the dance. During the night, Georgina introduces herself and she and Lana bond and dance together. They later go to Lassiter's Lake. A couple of weeks later, Lana is due to go back to Canada and during her farewell party she says goodbye to Georgina.
10 December 2004–1 February 2005	Michael Cassidy	David Paterson	Michael is the son of Charlie and Catherine Cassidy. Michael believes he is being pushed out of the family when Charlie meets his daughter, Lyn Scully. Michael's aunt, Doreen, tells him that Charlie is dying and he returns to see his father and meet Lyn. As Michael walks into Lyn's house, he sees Stephanie Scully leaning over his dead father with a pillow. Michael thinks Steph killed him and he is happy when Steph is arrested. Lyn pleads with Michael to forget the past and reach out to his family and he apologises to Steph before leaving.
