= Ringo Brown =

Fictional character

- Neighbours character
- Portrayed by: Sam Clark
- Duration: 2007–2010
- First appearance: 24 January 2007
- Last appearance: 1 October 2010
- Introduced by: Ric Pellizzeri
In-universe information
- Other names: Rick Yeats
- Occupation: Erinsborough High student (2007–09); Delivery boy (2007–08); Trainee paramedic (2009–10); Laborer (2010)
- Father: Graham Brown
- Mother: Prue Brown
- Brothers: Frazer Yeats; Johnny Brown; Paul Brown
- Sisters: Pauline Brown
- Wife: Donna Freedman (2010)
- Grandfathers: Stuart Brown
- Grandmothers: Astrid Brown
- Nephews: Marco Yeats

Ringo Brown is a fictional character from the Australian soap opera Neighbours, played by Sam Clark. Clark was given the role after he entered and won a Dolly magazine competition. He made his first screen appearance during the episode broadcast on 24 January 2007. Ringo's storylines have included his ongoing battle with an eating disorder, a bus crash, a relationship with an older woman, the collapse of a warehouse roof at an illegal dance party and his on-off relationship with Donna Freedman (Margot Robbie). In July 2010, it was announced that Clark had decided to leave Neighbours. He filmed his final scenes at the end of the month and Ringo made his last credited appearance on 1 October 2010, but was killed off-screen in the next episode.

== Casting ==
In 2006, Australian teen magazine, Dolly, held a competition offering two readers a chance to win a three-month contract with Neighbours. Dolly received 7,000 entries for the competition. Clark auditioned with his best friend, Tim Phillipps, who went on to play Fox, the figment of Paul Robinson's (Stefan Dennis) imagination. Clark subsequently won the competition, along with Adelaide Kane (Lolly Allen), and he was signed to a three-month contract to play the part of Ringo Brown. Compared with other Neighbours cast members who were cast through more traditional casting processes, Clark ultimately went through a longer audition process, auditioning four times before being cast, compared to the two auditions most cast members were required to go through. The process included a taped audition, a closed audition with the casting director at a Westfield's, acting alongside a cast member on a public stage at a Westfield's, and finally the final five auditioned on set. On his audition Clark said "I really didn't think I'd have any chance of getting anywhere. Apart from trying to do something a bit different with the script, I kept mine pretty simple". Two days after the audition he was told he had the part, and started filming one and a half months later. Just before his debut episode aired, Clark's contract was extended from the three months to nine months. Clark remained with the show for over three years.

In 2009, it was announced that Clark would be taking a three-month break from Neighbours to focus on his music career. When Clark returned to filming in February 2010, it was announced that he would perform one of his songs for departed character, Bridget Parker, played by Eloise Mignon.

== Development ==
=== Characterisation ===
In his fictional backstory, Ringo is the youngest in a line of siblings named after The Beatles. As a child, Ringo idolised his older brother George and was distraught when he left home and changed his name to Frazer Yeats (Ben Lawson), leaving Ringo alone with their small-minded parents and elder brother Johnny. Ringo resented his brother for leaving and desperately wanted to become a part of Frazer's cool, new world. When his first episode went to air, Clark described Brown as "a good-hearted kid, he doesn't want to hurt anyone, and he does the normal things that a 16-year-old kid does". Clark later went on to explain that Ringo has "basically left home and come to live the life his brother is living", he also added that Ringo is a typical boy next door. Network Ten describe Ringo as someone who had "often drawn the short straw in life". He is not an academic, but he is clever at reading people. Ten said "he's a good boy at heart, but he isn't averse to bending the rules to score a win. With the world at large he's cocky, cheeky and good-humoured". They added that when he gets a crush on a girl, he is left nervous and is likely to say the wrong thing.

=== Eating disorder ===
One of Ringo's biggest storylines saw him develop an eating disorder. A writer for Holy Soap said that this is one of the first times in a soap opera that a male character has been at the centre of such a storyline. Ringo had suffered with anorexia in the past and he later had a relapse. Ringo refuses to admit that he has a problem with his addiction to losing weight. He almost drowns in a school swimming race due to lack of food and this leaves him feeling bad about himself. Rosetta Cammeniti (Natalie Saleeba) catches Ringo taking appetite suppressants, which leaves her upset by the situation. Clark said that until that moment, Ringo had concealed his problem from everyone but Pepper Steiger (Nicky Whelan). He added "Even Pepper thought he had the issue under control, but this is where it all comes to a head." Rosetta confronts Ringo and he is embarrassed and takes his anger out on her because he has been struggling with his problem for a long time. During an interview with Last Broadcast, Clark said that he believes guys are going through the same insecurities as girls, where they want to look like their heroes, such as soccer stars. He added that he was able to deal with the storyline because a close friend had suffered from anorexia. He also appreciated the time dedicated to the subject on the show. Clark later said that as eating disorders are on the rise among males, he believed the storyline was "realistic." On whether the storyline would carry on, Clark said "The only drawback was giving it the attention it requires. Because of the limitations of storylines, it would have been impossible to continue with this subject for too long. In reality, of course, eating disorders can continue for years." During a 2008 interview with TV Week Clark named the eating disorder storyline as his favourite storyline on the show so far. He also called it the hardest storyline because he had to really focus and get involved in it.

=== Relationship with Carmella Cammeniti ===
In 2007, Ringo began a brief relationship with the much older Carmella Cammeniti (Natalie Blair). They share a kiss in a swimming pool during their siblings' pre-wedding celebrations at Lassiters Hotel. Ringo had fancied Carmella for a while and Carmella had just ended her relationship with Oliver Barnes (David Hoflin). Of Ringo's reasons for his crush on Carmella, Clark said "She treats him like an adult and in a completely different way to how Rachel treated him. Then there's the fact that they get along really well together". When Ringo discovers that Carmella is starting to feel the same way about him, he lets her know that he senses her interest. Blair said that her character gives into Ringo advances because she is in an "insecure place". She also said "Ringo makes her feel wanted and appreciated – he's constantly saying wonderful things to her". Carmella thinks that it is a bit of fun, something she has not had in a while. Blair added "I think she's using him to make herself feel better". Clark said that the new relationship is embarrassing for Carmella and because Ringo is "so head-over-heels" for her, he does not mind when she asks him to keep quiet about it. Carmella later ends the relationship with Ringo, but he cannot accept it is over. At Sky Mangel (Stephanie McIntosh)'s farewell party, Ringo declares his feelings for Carmella in front of everyone. Carmella is then forced to tell him that she was never in love with him. Clark said he felt sorry for his character and called the situation "the ultimate embarrassment for him". Ringo then decides to leave town with his mother, Clark said "He just feels so embarrassed and as though he doesn't fit in anymore in the street".

=== Marriage ===
Ringo and Donna Freedman (Margot Robbie) marry as part of the 25th anniversary celebrations. Clark was delighted with the storyline stating: "It was really lovely. Their relationship has been on and off over the past couple of years, so it was a nice culmination of that. It's great to see them rock solid now. The wedding was filmed on location and Clark said it was more meaningful than any studio or tiny church. Clark also had the least amount of filming to contribute to the storyline, whilst others characters spent whole days filming. He branded Donna as "the bride from hell" during the preparations. The wedding drew comparisons to the previous wedding of Scott Robinson (Jason Donovan) and Charlene Mitchell (Kylie Minogue).

=== Departure ===
In July 2010, Clark announced that he was to leave the show to concentrate on his music career. He filmed his final scenes at the end of the month. On his departure, Clark said it was one of the hardest decisions of his life. He added "I've been working on music for a very long time now and it was getting too hard to fit the two together and do them to the level I wanted. I feel as though the decision is right but that doesn't make it any easier". Clark said Ringo's departure from the show was a "decent send-off" and he hoped that Ringo would be a "character who is remembered for years to come". When he was asked if the door was open for his return, Clark said it was up to the script writers.

In October, it was revealed that a "much-loved character" was to die in a drink-driving accident. Ringo was one of two potential fatalities, the other being Stephanie Scully (Carla Bonner). Steph is suffering from postpartum depression and after a confrontation with Libby Kennedy (Kym Valentine) she takes off on her motorbike. Steph had also been drinking the night before and she is speeding. Ringo, Kate Ramsay (Ashleigh Brewer) and Declan Napier (Erin Mullally) are returning to the car after Ringo had to go out to buy cupcakes for his and Donna's wedding anniversary. Ringo is in the wrong place at the wrong time, which also puts his life in danger. Steph comes around the corner on her bike and Clark explained that as Kate steps onto the road, Ringo sees the bike and pushes Kate out of the way. However, Clark added "[Ringo] tries to get out of the way himself – but he may not manage to." Ringo later dies and Steph is charged with driving under the influence of alcohol. Clark later said that his exit plot was "a lot of fun" and that he got to perform the stunt himself. Of this, Clark said " [I] narrowly, in real life, just missed a motorbike coming at me! It's an exciting way to leave a show." Clark added that as filming on Neighbours is shot out of sequence, this was not his last scene and he left on a "high" as his last scene was a humorous one. Despite Ringo's death, Clark is often asked if he will return.

== Storylines ==
Ringo arrives in Ramsay Street to see his brother Frazer and is initially mistaken for an intruder by Zeke Kinski (Matthew Werkmeister). Frazer explains to Ringo that he came to Erinsborough to win the heart of their brother's ex-fiancée, Rosetta Cammeniti. Frazer allows Ringo to stay with him and he enrols at Erinsborough High. Ringo develops a crush on Zeke's sister Rachel (Caitlin Stasey) and turns to Lolly Allen for advice. However, he finds himself helping her out when she admits that her stepmother, Sandy Allen (Catherine Hill), has been abusing her. When Sandy falls into the pool, Ringo rescues her and Rachel is impressed. Ringo then admits that he cannot swim and Rachel decides to teach him. After their first lesson, Ringo and Rachel first kiss and begin dating.

Ringo starts working for Carmella Cammeniti's fruit and vegetable company. Ringo grows close to Carmella as she treats him as an adult and he helps her to overcome her anti-depressant addiction. After finding themselves alone one day, Carmella and Ringo almost kiss, but Carmella backs off. Ringo decides to break up with Rachel and he and Carmella almost kiss again. The night before Frazer and Rosetta's wedding, Ringo decides to go to Lassiter's pool and Carmella joins him. They kiss, but Carmella realises that it is wrong and she leaves. After the wedding, some of the residents are driven back home in a minibus by Toadfish Rebecchi (Ryan Moloney). During the journey, Ringo moves to the back of the bus to talk to Carmella. The minibus is hit by a removal van, causing it to crash. Ringo is trapped in the wreckage and he tells Carmella that he loves her. Carmella tells him that she loves him too. Ringo is rushed to hospital and he suffers a cardiac arrest, causing the doctors to put him into a coma. When he is brought out of the coma, he remembers what Carmella said to him and confronts her. Carmella tells him that she lied and Ringo decides to spend some time at home with his mother, Prue (Penny Cook).

Ringo becomes very body conscious and starts to lift weights, go running and not eating properly. Pepper Steiger realises that these are the signs of an eating disorder, but when she confronts Ringo, he denies he has a problem. Pepper eventually gets through to him and he begins to eat normally again. Pepper later tells Daniel Fitzgerald (Brett Tucker) and Rosetta about Ringo's problem. When Rosetta catches Ringo using appetite suppressants, she tells Frazer about his condition. After nearly drowning during a swim trial, Ringo is confronted by Daniel and Frazer and refuses counselling. Ringo continues to struggle with his eating disorder and during a swim in the sea, he swims out too far and finds himself unable to get back to shore. He is found unconscious on the beach by Bridget and Steve Parker (Steve Bastoni). While recovering in hospital, Ringo decides to take control of his life and moves in with the Kennedy family. During his 18th birthday party, Ringo tells everyone about his eating disorder. He also says goodbye to Frazer and Rosetta who leave for Italy.

Ringo begins a relationship with Donna Freedman. When Susan finds some photographs of Donna in Zeke's draw, Ringo believes that they were having an affair and breaks up with Donna. She tells him nothing happened and Ringo learns Zeke had a crush on her. When Bridget dies, Ringo decides that he wants to become a paramedic. When Ringo learns Donna cheated on him with Andrew Robinson (Jordan Smith), he leaves for Sydney to attend a paramedic course. Ringo returns to Erinsborough to support Bridget's husband, Declan, through her birthday and agrees to be friends with Donna. On his first day as a trainee paramedic, Ringo messes up his first job, but later diagnoses Naomi (Kate Bell) with anaphylaxis. Ringo visits Naomi in hospital and they eventually start dating. When Ringo breaks up with Naomi, after discovering that she stole his ID card, she does not take it well and blames Donna. Naomi frames Donna for stealing her hospital records, so Ringo goes to Naomi's house to look for evidence and finds a shrine dedicated to him. After Naomi is arrested, she calls Ringo and begs him to meet her. Ringo ignores the calls and Naomi is admitted to hospital after she is hit by a car. Ringo visits her and she blames him for everything.

Ringo decides to get a job on a building site, but discovers that Toadie is serving a writ on his boss, Jim Dolan (Scott Parameter) over a previous job. When Donna goes to pick Ringo up from the site, she is crushed by some scaffolding and Ringo helps her to breathe. When Donna gets better, Ringo tells her he loves her and proposes. Donna initially turns him down, but then proposes to him and he accepts. Ringo wins a Green Card to work in the US and he and Donna bring forward their wedding. Prue arrives in town and is forced to tell Ringo that she has split up with his father. Ringo panics when Donna is late to the wedding, but she soon turns up and they marry. Donna then moves in with Ringo and the Kennedys. On their one-month anniversary, Ringo goes out of town to buy Donna's favourite cupcakes. As he is walking back to the car, Stephanie Scully comes round the corner on her motorbike and hits Ringo. He is taken to the hospital, but dies from his injuries.

== In other media ==
In 2009, Neighbours became the first Australian series to establish Twitter accounts for its characters. Ringo was one of four characters to have an account set up, with the others being Declan, Donna and Zeke. They began sending daily updates to their fans, giving advice and talking to each other. The updates are "complementary to the show's on-air storylines". FremantleMedia Enterprises vice-president of licensing Ben Liebmann said, "We thought it was a really great way to continue or allow the audience to engage with the Neighbours world off-screen". The messages are overseen by the Fremantle digital team, which is integrated with the story department of the Neighbours production team.

== Reception ==
For his portrayal of Ringo, Clark received a nomination for Most Popular New Male Talent at the 2008 Logie Awards. At the 2007 Inside Soap Awards, Clark was nominated for Best Newcomer. The 2009 ceremony saw Clark nominated for Sexiest Male. A writer for Holy Soap named Ringo's eating disorder storyline as his most memorable moment, saying "Ringo broke soap barriers when it was revealed he suffered from an eating disorder, with which he still battles". Ringo was named one of OK! magazine's Top 10 Neighbours characters of all time in 2010 by the publication's Twitter followers. They said, "Ringo Brown (Sam Clark) – A newbie whose name was all over our Twitter page. Was given the role after winning a competition and has clearly got a lot of you smitten."

The character has received a mixed response from critics. Upon his introduction, a Daily Record reporter observed, "It seems the lad is a tearaway – but seeing as every teen who arrives in Neighbours tends to be just that, such news won't come as much of a surprise. Frazer isn't exactly thrilled to see his sibling." The reporter added that Ringo would "cause more upset" by dating Lolly. During Ringo's AFL storyline, critic Larissa Dubecki of Wa Today described Ringo as a "regular nice teenage boy" who was transforming into a "footy hero dickhead". Ringo has been negatively received by Ruth Deller of television website Lowculture who called him "a bit of a dick who doesn't have any purpose whatsoever on the show right now". Fergus Shiel and Michael O'Reilly from The Age stated "Poor Ringo Brown. The boy's a nong but don't judge him too harshly. He's been through a hell of a lot. Named after a Beatle. Off his grub for much of his youth. Perennially unlucky in love, in traffic and beneath falling masonry on the dance floor. Now Donna's openly likening him to a bulldog clip and Zeke's sweetness has become her weakness." Katie Baillie writing for Metro included Ringo on a list of the "worst Neighbours characters" ever. Baillie opined that Ringo was "irritating for no good reason" and "a goody two-shoes". She also ridiculed his public declaration of love for Carmella.
