= Frazer Yeats =

Character in Neighbours

- Neighbours character
- Portrayed by: Ben Lawson
- Duration: 2006–2008
- First appearance: 12 October 2006
- Last appearance: 25 April 2008
- Introduced by: Ric Pellizzeri
In-universe information
- Other names: George Brown
- Occupation: Professional gambler Taxi driver
- Father: Graham Brown
- Mother: Prue Brown
- Brothers: Johnny Brown; Paul Brown; Ringo Brown
- Sisters: Pauline Brown
- Wife: Rosetta Cammeniti
- Sons: Marco Yeats
- Grandfathers: Stuart Brown
- Grandmothers: Astrid Brown

Frazer Yeats is a fictional character from the Australian television soap opera Neighbours, played by Ben Lawson. The character was introduced into the serial as part of a group of four characters branded as "20 somethings". He debuted in the episode airing on 12 October 2006. He departed the serial 25 April 2008 after Lawson quit. He was central to notable storylines such as gambling, paralysis, pseudocyesis and causing the accidental death of his younger brother as a minor.

== Creation and casting ==
The character was created in 2006 along with three others, as part of a new group of "20 somethings". Nicky Whelan, Natalie Saleeba and Christian Clark were cast as Pepper Steiger, Rosetta Cammeniti and Will Griggs respectively, around the same time as Ben Lawson was cast as Frazer after he was offered the role. Their inclusion in the serial was part of the producers attempts to introduce more contemporary characters, despite not knowing each other they all share the same house upon their on-screen debuts, a first for the series. Of the house share plot, Lawson stated during an interview with tabloid The Daily Telegraph: "I've been in the worst share house. So it's nice to see years of misery are finally paying off." Before his debut in the serial Rosie was stated to be the object of his affections, stating Frazer just wanted to be part of a wealthy family.

== Development ==
Before appearing on-screen Frazer was described as "a gambler with a shady past and secrets that will send Ramsay Street into a spin.." Frazer has been characterised through his job of gambling, his want of a better life and his subsequent romance with Rosie. Channel Ten publicity describe Frazer, they state he is "fiercely ambitious". When he was younger he believed he was destined for great things, better than his suburban middle-class upbringing. They cite that as being the reason why he left home at a young age and changed his name to something more "exotic". They describe him as wanting power and money, but is impatient and doesn't want to achieve it in a traditional way. Describing him as ruthless to how he gets these things. They cite his caring nature as being his downfall, adding it has been what has stopped him from conning many people.

Rosie's pregnancy storyline saw the start of characteristic changes in Frazer, of this during an interview with entertainment website Last Broadcast, Lawson stated: "He used to be a bit of a maniac, but his life with Rosie turns him into a good guy, when she gets pregnant, he's so thrilled that he cuts out all the casino nonsense and gets a job driving taxis so that he can give his family financial stability." In September 2007 it was reported that Lawson had decided not to renew his contract at the end of the year, opting to pursue other projects. Describing Rosie and Frazer's exit storyline, Dan Bennet speaking for Network Ten states: "It will be a bittersweet departure for them. They will experience a big tragedy and, on the beck of that, find a sense of new hope." Frazer's exit storyline saw him leave Ramsay Street to go to Italy with Rosie.

== Storylines ==
To get a room at Number 30, Frazer and Pepper Steiger agreed to pretend that they are engaged. Allan Steiger (Joe Clements) puts Frazer through a series of physical tests, he finds out the truth. Allan did a police check on Frazer, and it was revealed that there was no record of a Frazer Yeats, meaning that he had a fake name, revealing he used to be named George Brown and wanted to forget his old life. He then reveals he is a professional gambler. Janae Hoyland (Eliza Taylor-Cotter) threw a spanner into the air, and hit him on the head, knocking him out. Frazer pays for Carmella Cammeniti's (Natalie Blair) facial surgery.

Frazer falls in love with his other female housemate, Rosetta Cammeniti. He had originally wanted to move into number 30 because he knew Rosie would be there, and was determined to get his hands on her family's money. His brother Johnny had previously been engaged to Rosie. Rosetta was attracted to Will, who was with Carmella. Rosie kisses Paul Robinson (Stefan Dennis), Frazer comforted Rosie during the stage, Rosie tries to seduce Frazer. They nearly end up sleeping together, but Rosie could not decide between Frazer and Paul, so Pepper decided that they should have a competition to see who is better. She initially chooses Paul, but then chooses Frazer. After Frazer and Rosie have a short lived relationship, he begins a brief relationship with Milly Hallsworth (Kristie Jandric).

Frazer's brother Ringo Brown (Sam Clark) moves to Erinsborough. At a race track Frazer is trampled by a horse while rescuing a young girl who runs out onto the track. This leaves him paralyzed from the waist down, and he reluctantly accepts Rosie's help through this ordeal after Milly dumped him. Frazer and Rosie become engaged. Frazer is told by doctors that his inability to walk was psychological. Frazer visits his grandparents' graves, Frazer is horrified to find a tombstone commemorating a thirteen-month-old brother, Paul, that Frazer did not know existed. It is eventually revealed that Frazer had let Paul drown when they were children and his mother, Prue (Penny Cook) blamed him. He later regains the use of his legs after saving Mickey Gannon (Fletcher O'Leary) from drowning in a swimming pool, he initially keeps it a secret from everyone.

The venue for Frazer and Rosie's wedding told them that they would be shutting for a year for renovations, so they had to either postpone the wedding or bring it forward. They decide to bring it forward, leaving them with only a week to plan the wedding. They marry and Frazer manages to stand up by himself and then manages to take a step towards Rosie at the altar. However, their wedding day is marred by the news they receive on their wedding night. Their friends have been involved in a bus crash while driving home from the wedding. The crash left many of their friends injured, and Frazer's little brother Ringo in a coma.

Frazer decides he wants to start a family with Rosie. After a few disagreements they decide that they are not ready yet because of Rosie's career and Frazer still feels he could not cope after what happened with his brother Paul. Rosie finds out, much to her distress that she is pregnant. Frazer tells her that if she cannot raise the baby, he will as a sole parent. Rosie says that she will give parenting a go because she wants to keep the marriage. Rosie and Frazer look forward to having the baby, but once they go for an ultrasound and cannot find a heart beat they are hit with the devastating news that there is no baby. However, they ask for a second opinion and learn there is a baby. Rosie and Frazer leave for a trip to Italy. Rosie gives birth to their son, who they name Marco after Rosie's brother-in-law who died as the result of a bushfire and they decide to stay in Italy permanently.

== Reception ==
For his portrayal of Frazer, Lawson was nominated for the Logie Award for Most Popular New Male Talent in May 2007. He also received a nomination for Best Newcomer at the 2007 Inside Soap Awards. He was also nominated for Sexiest Male and Best Couple, along with Saleeba, at the 2008 ceremony.

Whilst commenting on the programme in general, Ruth Deller of media website Lowculture praised Rosetta's relationship with Frazer describing it as a high point for Neighbours and said the serial would be "dull" when they departed. She drew comparisons with past couples stating: "Of the more recent additions to the cast [...] two of the most loved have been Frazer and Rosie. Brittle, neurotic, flawed but ultimately sweet Rosie and thoroughly nice and not-unattractive Frazer are one of those Ramsay Street couples that just work, and have been totally right for the show – feeling just as, well, Neighbours-y as pairings such as Madge and Harold, Scott and Charlene and Des and Daphne". A writer from Inside Soap revealed that the magazines staff were invested in Frazer and Rosie's relationship following their marriage. The questioned: "will it last? We sure hope so! If a couple as perfect as these two can't make it, then nobody can!"
