= Will Griggs =

Australian fictional character

- Neighbours character
- Portrayed by: Christian Clark
- Duration: 2006–2007
- First appearance: 12 October 2006
- Last appearance: 23 January 2007
- Introduced by: Ric Pellizzeri
In-universe information
- Other names: Sebastian Barnes
- Occupation: Barman; 2% owner of Lassiter's Hotel
- Father: Clifford Barnes
- Mother: Pamela Barnes
- Brothers: Oliver Barnes (adoptive)
- Nieces: Chloe Cammeniti

Will Griggs (also Sebastian Barnes) is a fictional character from the Australian Network Ten soap opera Neighbours, played by Christian Clark. The character debuted on-screen in the episode airing on 12 October 2006. He was introduced into the serial as part of a group of four characters branded as "20 somethings". Clark quit the series prematurely to concentrate on a film career and Will departed on 23 January 2007. Upon his departure from the serial, his younger adoptive brother Oliver Barnes (David Hoflin) was written into storylines.

== Development ==
Will was created in 2006 along with another three characters created at the same time as part of a new group of characters branded "20 somethings". Nicky Whelan, Ben Lawson and Natalie Saleeba were cast as Pepper Steiger, Frazer Yeats and Rosetta Cammeniti respectively, around the same time as Christian Clark was cast as Will. Clark said that his agent suggested he audition and received the part the thereafter he stated it all happened really quickly. Their inclusion in the serial was part of the producers attempts to introduce more contemporary characters, despite not knowing each other they all share the same house upon their on-screen debuts, a first for the series. Before appearing on-screen Will was described as "a drifter on a steep learning curve." Upon his arrival Will was described as a "slacker rich kid" and turning up on Ramsay Street made him "find rarefied air suffocating and decided to search out a "real" life."

A relationship is soon established between Will and Carmella Cammeniti (Natalie Blair), who falls in love with him and decides not to return to her convent. They consummate the relationship towards the end of 2006. Blair commented "She realised she really wanted to be with Will. I think she has put her life as a nun behind her now." It soon becomes clear to the audience that Will is lying and hiding something from Carmella. Blair called him "quite shady" and said that his stories do not add up, but Carmella initially accepts his excuses until they start to contradict one another. She continued, "He's weaving a bit of a web. Carmella really wants to get to the bottom of it, because she knows something is not right." Producer Peter Dobbs promised that there would be a big surprise in store when the serial returned in 2007. It was revealed that Will was imitating his brother Oliver Barnes (David Hoflin), who had left his family to find freedom. Network Ten publicity describe Will as being "shallow" and unable to cope with his new life, also branding him "irresponsible" they also compare him with Oliver, stating he does not have genuine sentiment behind his good-looking façade.

Before Will had appeared on-screen it was announced by Network Ten that after his initial 12-week contract had expired, Clark decided he did not want to renew his contract. After a short period of time Will departed from the serial. Clark later described Will during an interview stating: "Will was a great character to play, who had a lot of depth and past."

== Storylines ==
Will moves into Number 30 Ramsay Street with Frazer, Pepper and Rosie. Rosie becomes attracted to him instantly and writes about her feelings for Will in her diary, which Will sees. Rosie sets Will up on a date with her sister Carmella Cammeniti, which she accepts. Will and Carmella have a good first date, but Will refuses to talk about his past. Will begins receiving strange gifts, such as keys to a new car, which he rejects. It is soon revealed that he is the heir to a large fortune, including a 2% share of Lassiters Hotel. Paul Robinson (Stefan Dennis) discovers this, along with Will's real name. He promises to keep Will's secret, as long as he votes against the Timminses at the next board meeting, as Paul cannot purchase the stock from Will.

Carmella asks to meet Will's parents, but as he does not want to tell her that his parents are dead, he pays his mother's assistant, Selma Atkins (Anne Cordiner), to play the role of his mother. Carmella later sees Will paying Selma and she breaks up with him, furious for him lying to her. Desperate to get back with her, Will reveals that his real name is Sebastian Barnes and that he is actually rich, as he inherited money and stock from his family, part of the stock being 2% of Lassiters Hotel. Carmella does not believe him, so he proves it to her by taking her in a limousine to a penthouse that he owns. Carmella begins to believe him, but when she tries to call him Sebastian, he says that he prefers Will, as that is who she fell in love with. Carmella accepts him for who he is, but she ends their relationship for good when she catches him lying again. Paul's daughter Elle Robinson (Pippa Black) finds out about Will's 2% share of Lassiters and she tries to seduce him, but he rejects her. Elle's boyfriend Dylan Timmins (Damien Bodie) become suspicious about them.

Will's brother Oliver arrives in Erinsborough and tells Carmella everything about Will. He also reveals that Will has decided to leave and has fled overseas. Oliver stays in town and works at Lassiters, until his resignation. Will then inherites his 49% share. Will later contacts Elle through his lawyer, Tim Collins (Ben Anderson). Tim tells Elle that she can work for the Barnes Corporation, with her and Will being business partners and Lassiters stockholders (at that point Will had 51% and Elle had 49%), if she fires either Paul or Oliver. In the end she chooses to resign, realising that Paul and Oliver are the perfect team for Lassiters.

== Reception ==
Upon Oliver's arrival to the show, Ruth Deller of television website Lowculture called Will the "fit brother" and added that the audience preferred him to Oliver. The Daily Record branded Will "a rather attractive young man".
