= Rosetta Cammeniti =

- Neighbours character
- Portrayed by: Natalie Saleeba
- Duration: 2006–2008
- First appearance: 12 October 2006
- Last appearance: 25 April 2008
- Introduced by: Ric Pellizzeri
In-universe information
- Occupation: Lawyer
- Father: Rocco Cammeniti
- Mother: Lucia Cammeniti
- Sisters: Rosaria Cammeniti; Carmella Cammeniti
- Husband: Frazer Yeats
- Sons: Marco Yeats
- Uncles: Raimondo Cammeniti
- Nieces: Chloe Cammeniti
- Other relatives: Angelica Cammeniti; Sofia Cammeniti

Rosetta "Rosie" Cammeniti is a fictional character from the Australian soap opera Neighbours, played by Natalie Saleeba. The character was introduced into the serial as part of a group of four "20 somethings." Saleeba began filming in July and she made her first on-screen appearance on 12 October 2006. Rosetta's storylines included an arranged marriage, a same-sex kiss and pseudocyesis. She departed on 25 April 2008.

== Creation and casting ==
Rosetta was created in 2006 along with another three characters as part of a new group of "20 somethings". Nicky Whelan, Ben Lawson and Christian Clark were cast as Pepper Steiger, Frazer Yeats and Will Griggs respectively. Their introduction was part of the producers attempts to introduce more contemporary characters and to fill the void left by several cast departures. Executive producer Ric Pellizzeri said "We've got 15-to-18-year olds and the 35-plus brigade, we've always liked the shenanigans of Toadfish (Ryan Maloney) and friends at No. 30, so we thought, rather than introduce a new family, we'll bring in some new 20-somethings as housemates and fill the middle ground we've been missing." Despite not knowing each other, the characters all share the same house upon their arrivals, which was a first for the series.

Former All Saints actress Saleeba was cast as Rosetta and she began filming in July. Saleeba said that it was a "bonus" joining the show at the same time as the others, as it made the process easier and less intimidating joining an established cast. Rosetta was given immediate family connections within the show in the form of younger sister and already established character Carmella Cammeniti (Natalie Blair). In 2008, Saleeba exited the role and Rosie's exit storyline saw her leave Ramsay Street to go to Italy with Frazer.

== Development ==
=== Characterisation ===
Before appearing on-screen Rosetta was described as Carmella's "strait-laced older sister", "a young lawyer and the object of Frazer's affections". Network Ten said Rosetta "appears to be just your average uptight lawyer. However, scratch the surface of the feisty Italian and you'll find that she can be every bit as passionate as her wayward younger sister Carmella." They commented on the burden of her being the eldest child, which automatically ensured she had to be responsible, they also state that she transformed as a person upon arriving in Ramsay Street, describing her as uptight, but eventually settling down. They add that she is eager to please her parents all the time, saying it was once her sole aim in life. Rosie is also career driven and business minded putting them before a family. Pellizzeri said that Saleeba plays the "perfect Neighbours character – a 27-year-old virgin." Audiences felt Rosetta and Carmella were cast well as they looked alike, Blair said they work well together as a unit and Rosetta's presence changes Carmella for the good.

=== Relationships ===
Rosetta's relationship with Frazer is a focal point of her storylining, it has provided the character different plots, including choosing her career over starting a family and her subsequent false pregnancy, of this during an interview with entertainment website Lastbroadcast Salebba stated: "Frazer's desperate to start a family, but Rosie feels that her career as a lawyer is more important at this time in her life, it creates a lot of tension between them. But then Rosetta really does fall pregnant, with complicated consequences..."

One of Rosetta's most notable storylines is a kiss shared with Pepper in the heat of the moment, the characters were portrayed agreeing to forget it ever happened. Australian press branded the kiss as a failed attempt to gain ratings for the serial, also stating it aired practically unnoticed along with a number of would be attention grabbing plots. Describing Rosetta and Frazer's exit storyline, Dan Bennet speaking for Network Ten states: "It will be a bittersweet departure for them. They will experience a big tragedy and, on the beck of that, find a sense of new hope."

== Storylines ==
A lawyer and the older sister of Carmella, Rosetta moves into No. 30 Ramsay Street along with Pepper Steiger, Frazer Yeats and Will Griggs. She had previously lived with her mother Lucia (Maria Mercedes), until she decided to cut herself loose, break up with her fiancé she was not in love with, and move to Erinsborough. Rosetta develops feelings for housemate Will, but did not act upon them out of fear of being rejected; meanwhile, fellow housemate Frazer had hidden feelings for her. Upon finding out Will only had eyes for sister Carmella, Rosetta's feelings for him disappeared.

Rosetta has an affair with Paul Robinson (Stefan Dennis) which leads him to leave his new wife Lyn Scully (Janet Andrewartha) on the day of their wedding. The affair does not last, and Rosetta and Frazer begin dating. However, when Frazer confesses to Rosetta that he is really George Brown, the brother of her former fiancé, Johnny Brown, she leaves him and takes comfort with Paul. Upon learning that Paul had an affair with her best friend, Pepper, Rosetta lashes out at him, accusing him of mistreating her friend. Pepper, overwhelmed by Rosetta's act of friendship, spontaneously kisses her before Rosetta kisses her back, unaware that Frazer's brother Ringo (Sam Clark) is watching. Ringo spreads the word, and everyone briefly suspects Rosetta and Pepper are gay. Rosetta reunites with Frazer, who has required a wheelchair following an accident on a race track. After they sort out their issues and learn more about each other, Rosetta and Frazer get engaged.

Frazer surprises everyone by walking on the day of the wedding. After the wedding ceremony the mini bus that is taking residents back to the street crashes leaving many injured, including Carmella and Ringo. Rosetta's boss Tim Collins (Ben Anderson) puts a lot of pressure on her by giving her more opportunities, which conflicts with everyone's increasing expectation that she and Frazer will start a family. After Tim's pressure puts Toadie in hospital from a panic attack, they decide to quit and start their own partnership, which becomes a success.

Though Frazer wants children, they both realise that they are not ready, so they agree to wait. After seeing how difficult it was for Carmella during Chloe's birth, Rosetta is convinced that she will never be able to stand the emotional strain of having children. However, she finds out, much to her distress, that she is pregnant. Frazer tells her that if she cannot raise the baby, he will – as a sole parent. Rosetta promises to try to raise the baby because she wants to save their marriage. Rosetta starts to look forward to having the baby, especially after becoming Chloe's godmother. When Rosetta believes she has lost the baby, a doctor confirms that there was no baby in the first place. They go for another scan and the doctor finds a heartbeat. After this Rosetta and Frazer decide to go to Italy to visit her extended family. Rosetta gives birth to a son, who she and Frazer name Marco, and they settle down in Italy.

== Reception ==
Saleeba was nominated in the "Best Newcomer" category at the "2007 Inside Soap Awards". They following year she and Lawson were nominated for "Best Couple". Lowculture's Ruth Deller praised Rosetta's relationship with Frazer describing it as a high point for Neighbours and said the serial would be "dull" without them. She also compared them with past couples saying, "Of the more recent additions to the cast [...] two of the most loved have been Frazer and Rosie. Brittle, neurotic, flawed but ultimately sweet Rosie and thoroughly nice and not-unattractive Frazer are one of those Ramsay Street couples that just work, and have been totally right for the show – feeling just as, well, Neighbours-y as pairings such as Madge and Harold, Scott and Charlene and Des and Daphne." TV Scoop called Rosie and Frazer "fully-formed, warm, witty characters who have been a genuinely great addition to the street". The Birmingham Mail chose Paul confessing his love for Rosetta and her confusion as their "pick of the day". Natalie Craig writing for The Sydney Morning Herald said Rosetta is like Maria from West Side Story - because she was "young, Italian and forced into an engagement with a man she does not desire". She jested it made Erinsborough appear like The Bronx. A writer from Inside Soap revealed that the magazines staff were invested in Rosie and Frazer's relationship. They revealed "will it last? We sure hope so! If a couple as perfect as these two can't make it, then nobody can!"
