= Marco Silvani =

Fictional character from the Australian soap opera Neighbours

- Neighbours character
- Portrayed by: Jesse Rosenfeld
- Duration: 2007–2008
- First appearance: 19 October 2007
- Last appearance: 8 July 2008
- Introduced by: Ric Pellizzeri
In-universe information
- Occupation: Fruit and Veg Wholesaler; The General Store Manager and Co-Owner (2008)
- Father: Franco Silvani
- Mother: Patrizia Silvani
- Sisters: Mia Silvani
- Wife: Marisa Silvani (until 2007); Carmella Cammeniti (2008)
- Stepdaughters: Chloe Cammeniti
- Uncles: Gino Silvani

Marco Silvani is a fictional character from the Australian soap opera Neighbours, played by Jesse Rosenfeld. He made his first on-screen appearance on 19 October 2007. Marco began a relationship with a pregnant Carmella Cammeniti, which caused tensions between himself and the baby's father, Oliver Barnes. Marco later asked Carmella to marry him and on the same day, he was injured in a bush fire. Marco died from his injuries shortly after and he departed on-screen on 2 July 2008.

== Character development ==
Rosenfeld was cast in the role of Marco Silvani, an "Italian heartthrob". The character of Marco was brought in to "spice up Carmella's love life". A triangle develops between Carmella (Natalie Blair), Oliver Barnes (David Hoflin) and Marco because Carmella is pregnant with Oliver's child. Oliver becomes territorial over Carmella and he grows jealous of Marco. Rosenfeld said "Marco is withholding a secret that could bring into question his motives for dating Carmella." Network Ten describe Marco as "handsome, charming, witty and intelligent". Despite his father being a traditional Italian, Marco is a "modern guy with an open mind". Marco is proud to be running his father's business, but he would rather be running his own restaurant. Ten also say that Marco has always wanted a family of his own and it has taken him a while to get over his failed marriage to Marisa.

In February 2008, it was announced that Rosenfeld was to leave Neighbours that year, along with co-stars David Hoflin (Oliver Barnes), Daniel O'Connor (Ned Parker) and Sweeney Young (Riley Parker). It was speculated that the departures were linked to the arrival of Susan Bower, who was appointed executive producer at the end of 2007. Rosenfeld filmed his last scenes in April 2008.

Marco's departure storyline centered on a bush fire. British magazine NOW reported that a picnic held by Carmella and Marco is at the centre of the action. Some residents manage to escape, while other have to take shelter. NOW added "The residents of Ramsay Street are forced to dig deep and find inner sources." TV Tonight said that Marco would not survive the fire when he is left outside. Marco is treated by Karl Kennedy (Alan Fletcher), but he does not respond to the emergency treatment. Marco and Carmella then decide to get married, before he dies. David Knox called the situation "very soapie!"

== Storylines ==
Marco is the only son of Franco Silvani (Gary Down). During his job as a local fruit and veg supplier, Marco sees a lot of Carmella Cammeniti. Marco and Carmella get talking and he finds out that she is pregnant and planning to take her fruit business online. Marco later helps Carmella out with some boxes and proposes that they become business partners. Carmella tells Marco that they just have a business partnership and Marco respects whatever she wants. Carmella suffers from stomach pains and is rushed to hospital. Marco finds himself stuck in the middle when Oliver Barnes arrives and Oliver asks Marco to leave. Marco returns with some flowers and says they are pink for a girl, which angers Oliver as he did not know the gender of the baby. Carmella accepts an offer from Marco to use his family's cottage for a few days. She and her sister have a look around and find photos of his wedding. Marco arrives with some supplies and Carmella confronts him. He tells her that he was married, but is now divorced. He then kisses Carmella. Marco goes behind Carmella's back to speak to the customers and when their website host goes bust, Marco is critical of her efforts to create another site. He then flirts with a new client, knowing that Carmella was watching. Marco arranges a cocktail party at his apartment and asks Carmella to co-host and invite all of their customers. The evening goes well and Marco and Carmella spend their first night together. Marco's mother, Patrizia (Lise Rodgers) and sister, Mia (Petra Yared) arrive at the apartment in the morning and are surprised to see Carmella. Marco tells his mother that he wants to be with Carmella. He also tells Mia that he is not getting back with his former wife.

Carmella goes into premature labour and she had to have an emergency C-section. After the baby is born, Carmella breaks up with Marco. Marco accepts a job on a winery in Western Australia and is offered a year-long contract to stay. Carmella calls Marco and she begs him not to sign, so he comes home. Harold Bishop (Ian Smith) later rents the couple his house. Mia begins dating Oliver and Marco tells her that his marriage failed because he is infertile. Marco then tells Carmella, who stands by him. Oliver confronts Marco at baby Chloe's christening and a fight breaks out. Oliver then vows to fight for custody. Marco and Carmella buy the General Store, which angers his father as he wants Marco to continue the family business. Marco tells his father that he cannot have children and his father tells him that it may have been his fault. Marco later makes up with his father. During a picnic in the bush, Marco proposes to Carmella and she accepts. A bush fire breaks out and when Marco leaves the shelter to get milk for Chloe, he is caught up in the fire. Marco is taken to the hospital and he is told that he does not have long to live. He and Carmella decide to marry and Marco dies shortly after. Marco appears to Carmella as a vision before and during his funeral and tells her it is time for him to go before disappearing.

== Reception ==
Rosenfeld was nominated for the Best Newcomer accolade at the 2008 Inside Soap Awards. Ruth Deller of Lowculture was negative towards Marco and Carmella and in July 2008, she wished they were leaving instead of Rosetta and Frazer. Of Marco's exit, Joe Julians of Digital Spy said, "Whilst not a particularly memorable character, Carmella's boyfriend Marco at least got a memorable death." In 2015, a Herald Sun reporter included Marco's death in their "Neighbours' 30 most memorable moments" feature, adding he is "critically injured, dies and returns as a ghost at his funeral.."
