= Oliver Barnes =

- Neighbours character
- Portrayed by: David Hoflin; Brody McPharlane (young Oliver)
- Duration: 2007–2008, 2011
- First appearance: 30 January 2007
- Last appearance: 15 March 2011
- Introduced by: Ric Pellizzeri (2007); Susan Bower (2011)
In-universe information
- Occupation: Hotel manager
- Father: Richard Aaronow
- Mother: Rebecca Napier
- Adoptive father: Clifford Barnes
- Adoptive mother: Pamela Barnes
- Stepfather: Paul Robinson
- Brothers: Declan Napier; Will Griggs (adoptive); Andrew Robinson (step)
- Sisters: Elle Robinson (step)
- Daughters: Chloe Cammeniti
- Grandfathers: Alan Napier
- Uncles: Marcus Napier
- Nieces: India Napier

Oliver Barnes is a fictional character from the Australian television soap opera Neighbours, played by David Hoflin. He made his first appearance during the episode broadcast on 30 January 2007. Oliver is the oldest son of Rebecca Napier (Jane Hall) and the brother of Declan Napier (James Sorensen). Some of Oliver's biggest storylines included discovering that he was adopted, finding his birth parents and becoming a father. Oliver departed the show on 8 August 2008. Hoflin and his co-star Natalie Blair reprised their roles in March 2011 to help facilitate Hall's departure from the show.

== Casting ==
In October 2006, it was announced that Hoflin would be joining Neighbours. Hoflin had originally auditioned for the role of Will Griggs, but he was forced to turn down the part because he was also working on a pilot for another Network Ten production". The show was not picked up and two days after hearing the news, the Neighbours producers called about new character, Oliver Barnes. Hoflin accepted the role of Oliver and arrived in time to help fill the gap left by Christian Clark's departure.

== Development ==
Channel Ten publicity describe Oliver branding him as "Honest, forthright and fun-loving", stating he is "free-spirited and big-hearted" compared to his brother Sebastian (Christian Clark), adding that he has "genuine sentiment". They comment that he is good looking and has serious charm. Oliver also has a manipulative side which was portrayed in his storyline with Elle Robinson (Pippa Black) when they con Paul Robinson (Stefan Dennis) out of ownership of his business.

In February 2008, it was announced that Hoflin was to leave Neighbours that year, along with co-stars Daniel O'Connor (Ned Parker), Jesse Rosenfeld (Marco Silvani) and Sweeney Young (Riley Parker). It was speculated that the departures were linked to the arrival of Susan Bower, who was appointed executive producer at the end of 2007.

In September 2010, it was revealed that Hoflin and co-star Natalie Blair would be returning to Neighbours in March 2011. They filmed their scenes in the last two weeks of production in 2010. It was announced that their arrival "coincides with the demise of one of the show's most controversial couples". Bower said "It's wonderful to have Nat and David back on Ramsay Street, they both still have many friends among the cast and crew, their visit will be short but I promise, memorable".

== Storylines ==
Oliver grew up as the son of Pamela (Brooke Nicol) and Clifford Barnes (Anthony Wemyss) and the brother of Sebastian Barnes. When Pamela and Clifford died, Oliver was to become the heir to the Barnes family empire, but he turned his back on the fortune and travelled the world instead. Oliver allowed his brother to inherit the family business and Sebastian used Oliver's story to create an alter ego, Will Griggs, when he arrived in Erinsborough.

Oliver comes to Erinsborough after finding out about his brother's lies and he explains to Carmella that Sebastian has lied to everyone. Oliver and Carmella Cammeniti (Natalie Blair) grow closer and they begin a relationship, but Paul believes that Oliver would be a better match for his daughter Elle. Paul blackmails Ned Parker into helping him split Oliver and Carmella up, but Ned's plan doesn't work after Oliver stays with Carmella. When Carmella is asked to take over her family business to save it from being run into the ground by her uncle, Raimondo (Jeff Kovski), Oliver tries to help her financially. However, he is told that he cannot get his inheritance. Carmella eventually comes up with the money and the couple set up a fruit and vegetable business. When Carmella realises that her uncle has not forgiven her for giving away his daughter's child, the business soon runs into trouble. Carmella realises that she has to play Ray at his own game and Oliver grows uncomfortable when he witnesses Carmella's ruthless streak. Paul and Elle take a chance to make more trouble and decide to force Carmella and Oliver apart. They plant a bomb in Carmella's delivery van, making it look like Ray has done it, but the bomb detonates at the wrong time nearly killing Oliver and Carmella. When Carmella confronts Ray, he has a heart attack and Oliver, who witnesses the scene, breaks up with Carmella. When Ned tells Elle about being blackmailed by Paul, Elle and Oliver decide to bring him down. Paul is very happy when Oliver finally manages to sign documents entitling him to his inheritance, but during the document signing, Alan Napier (Barry Friedlander), an assistant to the Barnes family, suddenly collapses. At the hospital, Alan falls into a coma and as Oliver waits for news, he and Elle decide to continue with their plan and announce their engagement. Paul believes that he will now have access to Oliver's inheritance and sells Oliver his shares in Lassiters to be able to get Janelle Timmins' (Nell Feeney) half. Elle and Oliver then publicly declare that they now have full control of the company and Paul is left with nothing. Oliver then begins a relationship with Elle.

Meanwhile, Alan comes out of his coma and tells Oliver that he is his grandfather and Oliver is adopted. Oliver then tries to track down Alan's children to find out which one is his real parent. Marcus Napier (James Lawson) denies being Oliver's father and tells Oliver that his sister, Rebecca Napier (Jane Hall) is Oliver's mother. Oliver gets Rebecca's number and they arrange to meet, but she cancels at the last minute. However, when Rebecca hears that Oliver has been involved in an accident, she comes to visit him and things begin well until Rebecca announces that Paul is Oliver's father. Another DNA test is taken and proves that Paul is not Oliver's father. Oliver confronts Rebecca and when he sees Declan Napier (James Sorensen) he reveals who he is. Oliver then asks Rebecca who his father is and she tells him that his real father had been a violent man who she split up with after Oliver's conception, but she later reunited with him and he raped her, resulting in Declan. Elle finds out Oliver's father's name is Richard Aaronow (Blair Venn) and Oliver goes to meet him after doubting Rebecca's story about the type of man he is. Shortly after the meeting with Richard, Carmella reveals to Oliver that she is pregnant with his child. Oliver is delighted, but Elle isn't so happy and their relationship ends. When Richard follows and confronts Rebecca at a picnic, she knocks him unconscious and he is taken to the hospital where they are informed that Richard is dying from kidney failure and only has weeks to live. Oliver decides to donate his kidney, so he can keep Richard alive long enough to give Rebecca justice in court. Oliver survives the transplant operation, but Richard's health deteriorates and he later dies.

Oliver's attentions then turn back to his unborn child and he is unhappy with Carmella's new relationship with Marco Silvani. When Carmella goes into premature labour, both Oliver and Marco are there to witness the birth of Oliver's daughter, Chloe Cammeniti (Sarah May). Chloe is born premature and she is moved up to the neonatal intensive-care unit. Oliver then becomes attracted to Marco's sister, Mia (Petra Yared) and they begin a short relationship. After breaking up with Mia, Oliver rekindles his relationship with Elle, despite her apprehensions. A few weeks later, Oliver is caught up in the bushfire that sweeps through Carmella and Marco's engagement party. Oliver manages to get to safety with some of the other neighbours, but Marco disappears after going to get Carmella's ring. At the hospital, Oliver thanks Marco for helping to save his daughter and Marco asks Oliver to be his best man as he and Carmella are going to get married at the hospital. Marco dies shortly after he marries Carmella. Oliver is then offered a job abroad and he decides to accept and asks Carmella and Chloe to join him. However, Carmella turns him down as it's too soon after Marco's death. Carmella and Chloe later decide to join Oliver in Portugal and they send a video message to Rebecca telling her how they're doing.

Declan calls Oliver when Paul begins to make Rebecca's life difficult after she leaves him and Oliver, Carmella and Chloe arrive in Erinsborough. Oliver goes to see Paul and warns him to stay away from his family. He then tells Rebecca that they have come to take her back with them. When Rebecca tells him that she is staying with Michael, Oliver appeals to him and explains that Rebecca needs to leave Erinsborough. Rebecca changes her mind and the family leave.

== Reception ==
Hoflin was nominated in the "Sexiest Male" whilst portraying Oliver and "Best Couple" along with Natalie Blair, for their on-screen partnership at the 2007 Inside Soap Awards. Inside Soap asked their readers whether they preferred Oliver with Carmella or Elle. The results showed that Oliver and Carmella was the favourite pairing, gaining sixty-six percent of the vote. Of Oliver and Elle's relationship, a Daily Record reporter stated "We always knew that Oliver and Elle were meant to be together – it's just taken them some time to work it out. He, of course, seemed to have some wild oats to sow before he could settle down – even his mother described him as a 'pantsman' at one stage. Now it seems the time has come for him to quit being a Lothario, but you can't blame Elle for being a little wary."
