= The Box (1975 film) =

1975 Australian film

- Directed by: Paul Eddey
- Written by: Tom Hegarty
- Based on: story by Tom Hegarty; Ray Kolle
- Produced by: Ian Jones
- Starring: Barrie Barkla, Fred Betts, Belinda Giblin, Ken James, Paul Karo, George Mallaby, Judy Nunn, Lois Ramsey
- Cinematography: Wayne Williams
- Edited by: Philip Reid
- Production company: Crawford Productions
- Distributed by: Roadshow
- Release date: 8 August 1975
- Running time: 100 mins
- Country: Australia
- Language: English
- Budget: A$300,000
- Box office: A$857,000

The Box is a 1975 Australian film adaptation, based on the Australian soap opera of the same name produced by Crawford Productions and featuring much of the cast from the regular series, albeit on a different timeline from the series.

The film also features Graham Kennedy playing himself, and Cornelia Frances in the key role of Dr. S. M. Winter, an efficiency expert brought in to improve operations at UCV-12. Robin Ramsay played Winter's assistant Bruce. Marilyn Vernon as starlet Ingrid O'Toole, and Leonie Bradley, credited as "Nature Girl", provide nude glimpses, as does the returning Belinda Giblin as Kaye Webster. Keith Lee played Price, and Robert Forza appeared as Channel 12's clapper loader. George Mallaby, whose character Paul Donovan had left the station to live in Bali, also returned; Paul briefly resumed his relationship with Kaye.

== Plot ==
Channel 12 is in financial difficulties. The company board calls the bluff of managing director Sir Henry Usher (Fred Betts), forcing him to call in a systems expert to improve station operations. Station staff are initially surprised to learn that the expert, Dr Winter, is a woman, named Sheila (Cornelia Frances). Graham Kennedy appears as a guest host on the channel's popular variety show Big Night Out replacing usual host Gary Burke (in reality Peter Regan, who played Burke, refused to appear in the film for contractual reasons). Various attempts to first impress, and then to hinder Dr Winter end disastrously. A feature film, Manhunt, directed by Lee Whiteman and starring Tony Wild and Kennedy, is produced with hopes to increasing station income. Thanks to Wild's ineptitude the resultant footage is a disaster but the film finds unexpected success when reworked as a comedy.

== Production ==
The film was shot on 35 mm on new sets at Crawford Productions' Abbotsford studios over four weeks in early 1975. Part of the budget was contributed by the Australian Film Development Corporation. Marilyn Vernon appeared in several full frontal scenes that may have been deemed unsuitable for TV while Belinda Giblin was seen topless again just as she had been in the TV series.

David Stratton has written of the film that it was 'scarcely more intelligent than Number 96' (that is, the film) 'but at least [it] looked as though it had been made by professionals.' Brian McFarlane, lumping it in with the Number 96 film, said both were 'Dire weddings of opportunism and smut, they met with critical opprobrium but, one is sorry to add, some commercial success.'

The Box feature film was released on DVD on February 1, 2024 to coincide with the 50th anniversary of the series' debut February 11, 1974 on Australian television.

== Cast reprising roles from TV series ==
Actor	Role
Barrie Barkla	Max Knight
Fred Betts	Sir Henry Usher
Paul Karo	Lee Whiteman
Belinda Giblin	Kay Webster-Brooks
Ken James	Tony Wild
George Mallaby	Paul Donovan
Judy Nunn	Vicki Stafford
Lois Ramsay	Mrs. Hopkins
Ken Snodgrass	Jack O'Brien
Geraldine Turner	Lindy Jones
Luigi Villani	Mick Maloney

== Additional cast for the film ==
Actor	Role
Graham Kennedy	as Himself
Cornelia Frances	Dr. S.M. Winter
Robin Ramsay	Bruce
Robert Forza	Clapper loader
Marilyn Vernon	Ingrid O'Toole
Leonie Bradley	Nature Girl
Keith Lee	Price

== See also ==
- List of films based on television programs
