= Dolly Teen Choice Awards =

Australian teen choice awards (2006-08)

The Dolly Teen Choice Awards began in 2006 as a non-broadcast show with hosts Stephanie McIntosh and Jules Lund. The show (presented by Dolly Magazine and sponsored by Target) was held at Sydney's Luna Park Big Top on 31 August 2006 and included guests The Veronicas, Anthony Callea, Guy Sebastian, Lee Harding, Rogue Traders, Girlband, and Kid Courageous. In 2007 The Dolly Teen Choice Awards were held on the 5 September 2007 and hosted by Jules Lund and Jackie O.

== Awards location and host(s) ==
- 31 August 2006 - Luna Park Sydney hosted by Stephanie McIntosh and Jules Lund
- 5 September 2007 - Luna Park Sydney hosted by Jackie O and Jules Lund
- 2008 - Luna Park Sydney hosted by Brian McFadden

== Winners 2006 ==
- Raddest radio personality: Lowie
- Coolest VJ in the country: Axle Whitehead
- Most popular TV show: Neighbours
- Hottest music act: The Veronicas
- Best five-minute feed: Boost Juice
- Best mobile phone ring tone: Pussycat Dolls
- Most popular sportstar: Ian Thorpe
- Hottest album of 2006: Anthony Callea
- Best dressed celeb: Jodi Gordon
- Cult product of 2006: Maybelline Great Lash Mascara
- Best slashie: Natalie Bassingthwaighte
- King and Queen of teen: Isabel Lucas and Chris Hemsworth

== Winners 2007 ==
- Raddest Radio Host/Team: Kyle and Jackie O
- Coolest VJ in the Country: James Mathison
- Most Popular Show on TV: Home and Away
- Hottest Music Act: Dean Geyer
- Best Music Video: "Candyman" - Christina Aguilera
- Most Downloaded Ringtone in the Country: "Addicted to You" - Anthony Callea
- Most Popular Sports Star: Libby Lenton
- Most Popular Album: Closer To The Sun - Guy Sebastian
- Best Dressed Celeb: Kate Richie
- Best Slashie: Jennifer Hawkins
- Most Popular Reality TV Show: Dancing with the Stars
- Model "Celebrity" Citizen Award (Charity Work): Rhys Wakefield - The Mirabel Foundation
- King and Queen of Teen: Dan O'Connor and Natalie Blair

== Winners 2008 ==
- New Cool Kid On the Block: Gabriella Cilmi
- I Wanna Raid Her Wardrobe: Jennifer Hawkins
- Best on the Box: Video Hits host Faustina "Fuzzy" Agolley
- Totally Talented Actress: Kate Ritchie
- Totally Talented Actor: Rhys Wakefield
- Glued to the Screen: So You Think You Can Dance Australia
- Extreme Inspiration: Guy Sebastian - World Vision
- Most played on my iPod: Hook Me Up - The Veronicas
- Hottest Homegrown Music: Sneaky Sound System
- Global Music Superstar: Rihanna
- OMG! Award (for the scandal we can't stop talking about): The Chaser's APEC stunt
- Queen of Teen: Indiana Evans
- King of Teen: Lincoln Lewis

== See also ==
- Dolly (magazine)
