= Robert Forza =

Australian actor

Robert Forza is an Australian actor. He has had guest roles in Homicide (in 1974 and 1975) and Prisoner (playing Spud Murphy, between 1980 and 1983). He later had a recurring role as Rocco Cammeniti in Neighbours. Film appearances include a small role in the 1975 film The Box. He starred in the 2000 film The Wog Boy as Roberto the Chef.
