= Jesse Rosenfeld =

Australian actor (born 1983)

- Born: Jesse Rosenfeld; 17 October 1983 (age 42); Melbourne, Victoria

Jesse Rosenfeld (born 17 October 1983) is an Australian stage, television and film actor, best known for playing Marco Silvani on the soap opera Neighbours.

== Biography ==
Jesse was born in Melbourne, Australia, but spent much of his childhood in Cairns.

At the age of twelve, whilst living in Cairns, Jesse landed the role of Danny Tippler in Bruce Beresford's motion picture Paradise Road and found himself spending several months working alongside such actors as Frances McDormand, Glenn Close, Pauline Collins, Pamela Rabe, Elizabeth Spriggs and relative newcomer Cate Blanchett. His talent and enthusiasm were furthered by his work with these great performers. He returned to Melbourne to complete high school – at Bialik College – and spent a year at the University of Melbourne before his admission to the prestigious Victorian College of the Arts (VCA). He graduated from the VCA in 2005.

== Filmography ==
Film
Year	Title	Role	Notes
1997	Paradise Road	Danny Tippler	
2006	Caroline Duffy	Bert Lapire	
2009	The Stag	Matt	Short
2009	Coffee	Landlord	
2010	Miscast	TVC Director	Short
2011	The Wannabe Secret Agent	Jonathon Moore	Short
2012	Kitchen Sink Drama	Jake	Short
2012	Harry	Harry	Short

Television
Year	Title	Role	Notes
2001	The Secret Life Of Us		
2007–2008	Neighbours	Marco Silvani	Seasons 23–24 (main role, 167 episodes)
2012	Outland	Dylan	Season 1, episode 1: "Max" (guest role)
2014	Winners & Losers	Xavier England	Season 4 (recurring role, 3 episodes)

== Theatre ==
Year	Title	Role	Other notes
2004	The Caucasian Chalk Circle	Bizergan Kazbeki and others	Directed by James McCaughey (VCA Company)
2004	Absurd Person Singular	Geoffrey	Directed by John Bolton (VCA Company)
2004	A Midsummer Night's Dream	Lysander	Directed by John Bolton (VCA Company)
2004	The Cherry Orchard	Pishchik	Directed by Lindy Davies (VCA Company)
2004	The Three Sisters (play)	Solyony	Directed by Kirsten von Bibra (VCA Company)
2005	Women Beware Women	Lord Cardinal/Faboritio	Directed by Lindy Davies (VCA Company)
2005	Tag Hamlet	Francisco/Fortinbras/Lucianus	Directed by Roy Fordree (VCA Company)
2005	Genet's Prison	Lefranc	Directed by Robert Draffin (VCA Company)
2005	Translations	Captain Lancy	Directed by Rhys McConnochie (VCA Company)
2006	Hitchcock & Herrmann	Bernard Herrmann	Directed by David Knijnenburg and Jesse Rosenfeld (Melbourne Fringe Festival/ Darling You Were Marvellous Theatre Company)
2006	Fitler Patler	You	Directed by Mikhaela Muscat and Joel Kohn ( Think C.O.N.T.E.M.P )
