= David Hoflin =

Swedish-born Australian actor (born 1979)

- Born: 25 February 1979 (age 47); Stockholm, Sweden
- Occupation: Actor
- Years active: 1983–present
- Spouse: Natalie Blair (m. 2013)
- Children: 2

David Hoflin (/ˈdɑːvɪd/) is a Swedish-born Australian actor. He played Jason Bates in Ocean Girl between 1994 and 1998, and Oliver Barnes in Neighbours between 2007 and 2008.

== Early life ==
Hoflin was born in Stockholm, Sweden. He and his family moved to Australia when he was four years old.

== Career ==
Hoflin was nine when he played his first role opposite Meryl Streep and Sam Neill in Australian film Evil Angels (released as A Cry in the Dark outside of Australia and New Zealand), about the Lindy Chamberlain case, where a dingo stole baby Azaria Chamberlain from her tent at Uluru. He played the role of eight year old Aiden, the son of Meryl Streep's character.

After appearing in 1990 film Breakaway, 1992 miniseries Good Vibrations and drama series Law of the Land, Hoflin landed his breakthrough role in 1994, playing older brother Jason, one of the lead male characters in children's fantasy series Ocean Girl, over its four year run. The romantic chemistry between his character and that of Marzena Godecki's character, Neri, is one of the central themes of the series. The show was syndicated around the world including on the Disney channel in the US.

Further early credits included shows such as The Flying Doctors, A Country Practice, State Coroner, and The Lost World.

In 2001, he played one of the main characters, Patrick Gormley, in the teen drama Head Start. Patrick was described as "blunt, conservative and sceptical of anything new", and he was also protective of his sister Clare, played by Nadia Townsend.

In 2003, Hoflin had a role in drama biopic Swimming Upstream, opposite Geoffrey Rush, Judy Davis and Jesse Spencer, and continued to appear in guest roles in series including medical drama All Saints, police procedural series Blue Heelers and drama McLeod's Daughters. In All Saints, Hoflin played the character Kieran, who had become heavily intoxicated with alcohol at a rave and subsequently passed out and neglected his younger sister, who was later raped by his friend Lewis.

Hoflin joined long-running soap opera Neighbours in 2007 as Oliver Barnes. He received the job without auditioning, after Christian Clark (who played his character's brother Will Griggs) suddenly quit the series. Hoflin filmed his last scenes on 6 May 2008, the same day as fellow cast member Daniel O'Connor, but reprised his role in April 2011, for a two-week guest stint.

Hoflin joined the cast of American series Alcatraz in 2012, playing Thomas 'Tommy' Madsen, a supposedly deceased, former Alcatraz inmate who disappeared in 1963, who was also Rebecca Madsen's grandfather. In 2013, he was seen in drama series Touch with Kiefer Sutherland and in a season 8 episode of police procedural series Criminal Minds. The following year, he appeared in action-adventure drama series Crossbones, before guesting in Supernatural in 2015.

In 2015, Hoflin played F. Scott Fitzgerald, American author of The Greatest Gatsby, opposite Christina Ricci in Amazon Prime series Z: The Beginning of Everything.

In 2020, Hoflin featured as Officer Lowe in psychological thriller feature Fatale, with Hilary Swank and Michael Ealy. He then played Buck Johnson in 2021 black comedy film Decrypted, before landing the role of Daniel in the Amazon Prime series The Peripheral, starring alongside Chloë Grace Moretz.

== Personal life ==
Hoflin began a relationship with his Neighbours co-star Natalie Blair in 2008, while working on the series together. They married on 4 January 2013 in Warburton, Victoria. Blair and Hoflin welcomed their first child, a son, on 29 July 2016. Their second child, a daughter was born on 16 July 2025.

== Filmography ==
=== Film ===
Year	Title	Role	Notes
1988	Evil Angels (aka A Cry in the Dark)	Aidan (8 years)	Feature film
1990	Breakaway (aka Escape from Madness)	Geoffrey	Feature film
2003	Swimming Upstream	Harold Fingleton Jr.	Feature film
2003	The Cadet	Sam	Short film
2005	Stranded	Cam	Feature film

=== Television ===
Year	Title	Role	Notes
1991	The Flying Doctors	James Fraser	TV series, episode: "A Little Miracle"
1992	Good Vibrations	Donovan	TV miniseries
1994	Halfway Across the Galaxy and Turn Left	Bindy	TV series, episode: "Qwrk Lands on His Feet"
1994	Law of the Land	Joe Rankin	TV series, episode: "The Last Run"
1994–97	Ocean Girl	Jason Bates	TV series
1998	State Coroner	Andy Riordan	TV series, episode: "Watershed"
2000	Flipper	Robie	T V series, episode: "The Inquiry"
2000	The Lost World	Gideon	TV series, episode: "The Chosen One"
2000	Eugénie Sandler P.I.	Peter Mitchell	TV series, episodes: "1.3", "1.4"
2001	Head Start	Patrick Gormley	TV series
2002	All Saints	Keiran Sharkey	TV series, episode: "M For Memory"
2004	Blue Heelers	Scott Drummond	TV series, episode: "Running Scared"
2004	McLeod's Daughters	Paul Kendall	TV series, 2 episodes: "Every Breath You Take", "My Brother's Keeper"
2007–08	Neighbours	Oliver Barnes	TV series
2010	Big Love	First Son	TV series, episode: "Blood Atonement"
2010	NCIS: Los Angeles	Former Navy Lt. Lance Talbot	TV series, episode: "Disorder"
2011	Love Begins	Jake Weller	TV film
2011	Neighbours	Oliver Barnes	TV series, episodes: "1.6116", "1.6117"
2011	RCVR	Lohman	TV series, episode: "Little Green Men"
2012	Alcatraz	Tommy Madsen	Recurring role
2012	The Beauty Inside	Alex #9	TV series, episode: "Hello My Name Is Alex"
2012	Major Crimes	Special Agent Goodwin	TV series, episode: "Long Shot"
2012	NCIS	Randall J. Kersey	TV series, episode: "Shell Shock: Parts 1 & 2"
2013	Criminal Minds	Chad Dumont	TV series, episode: "Alchemy"
2013	Touch	William Norburg	TV series
2014	Crossbones	Charlie Rider	TV series
2015	Hawaii Five-0	Frank Simpson	TV series, episode: "Nanahu"
2015	Supernatural	Eldon Styne	TV series, 2, episodes: "Dark Dynasty", "The Prisoner"
2015	American Crime	Mark Skokie	TV series
2016	Mad Dogs	Johan	TV series, 2 episodes: "Xtabai", "Needles"
2016	NCIS: New Orleans	Daniel Nolan	TV series, episode: "If It Bleeds, It Leads"
2016	Once Upon a Time	Zeus	TV series, episode: "Last Rites"
2017	Z: The Beginning of Everything	F. Scott Fitzgerald	
2017	Supergirl	Rick Malverne	TV series, episode: "Alex"
2018	Bosch	Detective Doug Rooker	TV series
2018	God Friended Me	Charles Cole	TV series, episode: "17 Years"
2022	The Peripheral	Daniel	TV series
