= Christian Clark =

Australian actor, model, and entrepreneur (born 1979)

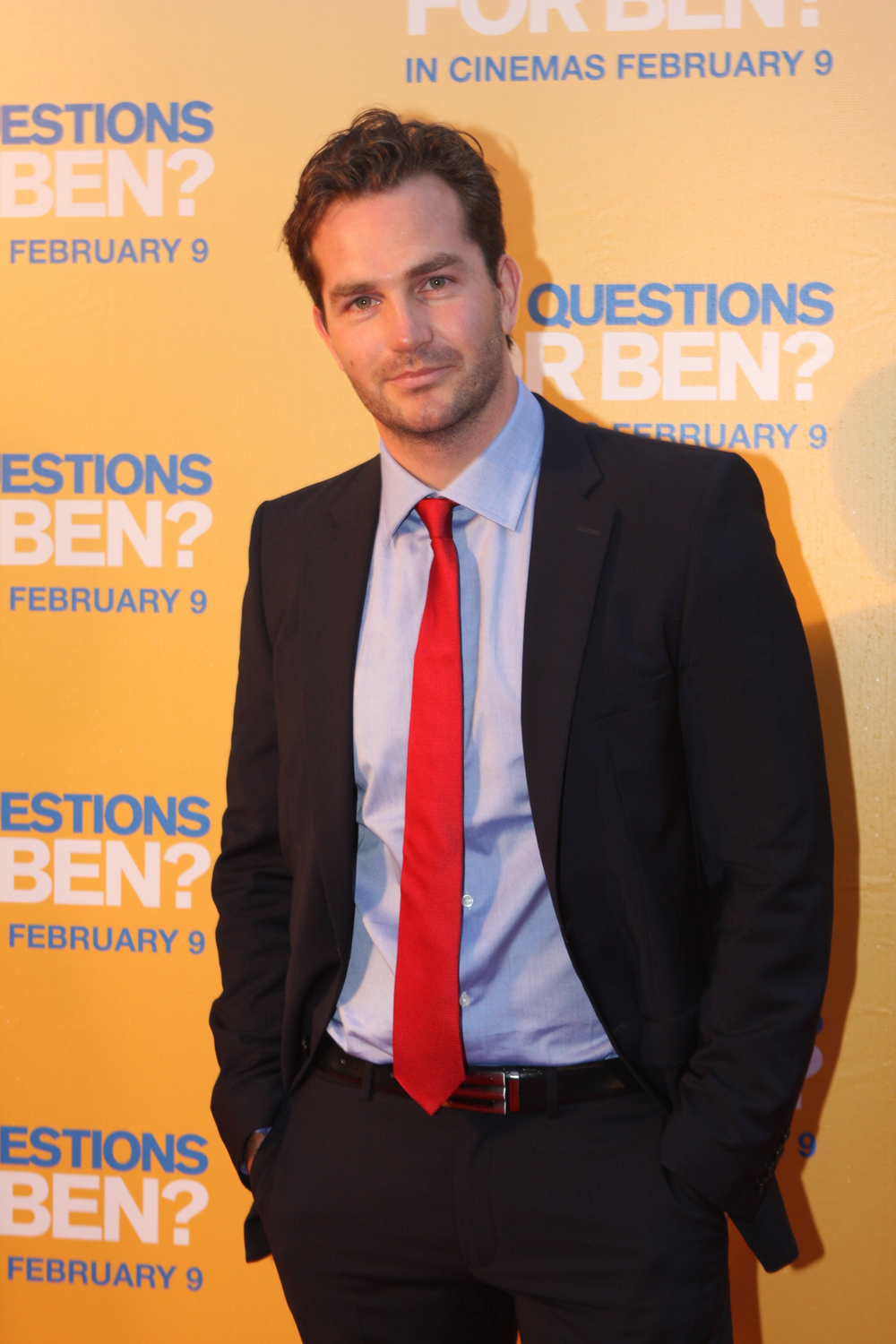
- Christian Clark in February 2012
- Born: 15 September 1979 (age 47); Mount Gambier, South Australia, Australia
- Occupations: Actor, model, producer
- Years active: 2006–present
- Known for: Neighbours (2006–2007); Home and Away (2010)

Christian Clark (born 15 September 1979) is an Australian actor known for his roles as Will Griggs in soap opera Neighbours from 2006 to 2007 and Penn Graham in Home and Away in 2010.

== Early life ==
Clark studied at Screenwise, a Sydney film and television school. He spent most of his twenties living overseas where he modelled and studied acting in New York. He also appeared in the music video for Bec Cartwright's single "On the Borderline".

== Career ==
In 2006, Clark joined the cast of long-running soap opera Neighbours, playing the role of Will Griggs. His character debuted alongside new fellow Number 30 residents Pepper (Nicky Whelan), Carmella (Natalie Saleeba) and Fraser (Ben Lawson), with Will eventually revealed as being a silent partner in Lassiters. Clark chose not to renew his twelve-week contract with Network Ten and departed in January 2007.

Clark next appeared in 2007 fantasy film Gabriel, playing the role of Sean and starred in comedy short $quid, alongside Josh Lawson and Ed Kavalee, while also serving as co-producer in the latter. The following year, he appeared in horror film The Gates of Hell. He followed this with 2009 thriller features Prey opposite Natalie Bassingthwaighte and Crush with Christopher Egan and Emma Lung, and had a minor role in miniseries False Witness opposite Dougray Scott and Claire Forlani.

In 2010, Clark joined the cast of soap opera Home and Away as the mysterious Penn Graham, a man who terrorised established character Alf Stewart (Ray Meagher).

Clark had a supporting role as Andy in 2012 comedy film Any Questions for Ben?, created by Working Dog Productions. That same year, he appeared in Ed Kavalee's film Scumbus, alongside an ensemble comedy cast including Toby Truslove, Kavalee, Glenn Robbins, Peter Helliar, Dave Hughes and Tony Martin, also serving as producer.

In 2013, Clark starred alongside Gary Sweet and Georgina Haig as Jakob in psychological thriller Nerve, which premiered at the Sydney Film Festival.

In 2015, he starred as Jason in comedy film Border Protection Squad, with Peter Helliar, Dave Hughes and Lachy Hulme.

Clark also had guest roles in the television shows Rescue: Special Ops and Mr & Mrs Murder.

== Personal life ==
Having done a stint in Hollywood, Clark discovered a fitness regime growing in popularity in the States and after returning to Australia, he opened a gym in the Sydney suburb of Mosman, incorporating the new workout.

== Filmography ==
=== Film ===
Year	Film	Role	Notes	Ref
2007	Gabriel	Sean		
2007	$quid		Short film; Also co-producer	
2008	The Gates of Hell	Dylan		
2009	Crush	Wesley		
2009	Prey	Jason		
2009	Smuggler	Ben	Short film	
2010	Dying Ice	Amon	Short film	
2010	Happy Endings	Date	Short film	
2011	Scumbus	Bernie Sutherland	Also producer	
2011	Venger	Anthony McCullough	Short film	
2012	Any Questions for Ben?	Andy		
2013	Nerve	Jakob Evans		
2014	Flat Daddy	Flat Daddy	Short film	
2015	Border Protection Squad	Jason Dundas	Also producer	
2020	Teenage Rangers	Mark Greenwood	Short film	

=== Television ===
Year	Film	Role	Notes	Ref
2006–2007	Neighbours	Will Griggs / Sebastian Barnes	33 episodes	
2009	Rescue: Special Ops	Best Man (Jason)	Episode 1.11	
2009	False Witness (aka The Diplomat)	Porter lookalike	Miniseries	
2010–2011	Home and Away	Penn Graham	53 episodes	
2011	Snobs	Gab's love interest	TV movie	
2013	Mr & Mrs Murder	Stephen	1 episode	
