= Natalie Saleeba =

Australian actress (born 1978)

- Born: Natalie Saleeba; 27 June 1978 (age 48); Perth, Western Australia, Australia
- Occupation: Actress
- Years active: 1995–present

Natalie Saleeba (born 27 June 1978) is an Australian actress. She appeared as Jessica Singleton in the medical drama series All Saints, Rosetta Cammeniti on Neighbours, and Abi on House Husbands.

== Early life ==
Saleeba was born in Perth, Western Australia; she is of Lebanese descent.

== Career ==
Saleeba is a trained actress, beginning her career in the early 2000s touring with the Bell Shakespeare Company as well as guest appearances on Always Greener, Stingers, and The Secret Life of Us. Saleeba's first lead role was as Debs in the British Foxtel co-production Love Bytes. Other early credits include Corridors of Power, Head Start and the feature film Under the Lighthouse Dancing.

Saleeba played the regular role of nurse Jessica Singelton on All Saints from 2004 to 2006 before moving on to Neighbours, playing Rosetta Cammeniti, the sister of Carmella. She made her on-screen debut on 12 October 2006 and remained with the series for 18 months.

From 2012 to 2017, Saleeba starred as Abi on the Logie winning comedy drama series, House Husbands.

== Filmography ==
=== Film ===
Year	Title	Role	Notes
1997	Under the Lighthouse Dancing	Acrobats	
2005	Short and Curly	Niki	Video
2009	The Sickie		Video short
2010	The Rehearsal		Short
2014	Red Nuts	Tina	Short
2015	Truth	Mary Murphy	
2018	The Craft	Hilary	Short, completed

=== Television ===
Year	Title	Role	Notes
1996	Sweat	Monique Bellenger	Recurring role
2001	Corridors of Power	Nicole	Episode: "1.1"
2001	Head Start	Mel	Episode: "Subterfuge"
2001–02	Always Greener	Christy Schaffer	Episodes: "The Mating Urge", "Baby Love", "Bright Sparks"
2002	Stingers	Macy Wright	Episodes: "Teamwork", "Looking After Number One"
2003	The Secret Life of Us	Libby	Episodes: "Great Expectations", "The People You Meet"
2004	Love Bytes		TV series
2004–2006	All Saints	Jessica Singleton	Recurring role (series 7–9)
2006–2008	Neighbours	Rosetta Cammeniti	Regular role
2011–2012	Winners & Losers	Claire Armstrong	Recurring role (series 1–2)
2012	Tricky Business	Sonia Sloane	Episode: "1.13"
2012–2017	House Husbands	Abigail 'Abi' Albert	Main role
2017–2019	Utopia	Melanie	Episode: "On the Defence", "The Blame Game"
2018	Dead Lucky	Imogen Lander	Episodes: "1.1", "1.3"
2021	Back to the Rafters	Sylvia Polson	1 episode
