= Lowculture =

British television website

lowculture.co.uk is a UK television website founded in January 2003 by Paul Lang, who currently works as the art director of Doctor Who Adventures.

== Purpose ==
The website sought to celebrate popular television shows, especially 'low brow television' each day selecting a pick of the day television show and spotlighting various facts. The site has become a cult hit among many readers, especially for its love of the more trashy and camp television in the UK - leading to some journalists labeling the site as part of the 'trashologist' movement

The website was also famous for backing contestants in Reality TV shows who have not been supported by the mainstream media. This has included Aisleyne Horgan-Wallace in Big Brother 7 and Same Difference in 2007's The X-Factor.

== Forum ==
The site also included a popular forum, where readers are invited to contribute on various topics from television shows to radio programmes. This part of the site has seen the development of LOLyoaks based on the internet phenomena of LOLcats and the UK Soap Hollyoaks, receiving spotlight in the UK Media.
