= Natalie Blair =

Australian actress (born 1984)

- Born: Natalie Louise Blair; 16 April 1984 (age 42); Brisbane, Queensland, Australia
- Other name: Natalie Hoflin
- Occupation: Actress
- Years active: 1995–present
- Height: 1.66 m (5 ft 5 1/2 in)
- Spouse: David Hoflin (m. 2013)
- Children: 2
- Awards: Logie for 'Most Popular New Female Talent' (2005)

Natalie Louise Blair (born 16 April 1984) is an Australian actress, best known for her role as Carmella Cammeniti on the Australian television soap opera drama series Neighbours.

== Early life ==
Blair was born in Brisbane, Queensland to Maureen and former professional AFL player John Blair. She attended Lourdes Hill College in Hawthorne.

== Career ==
Back in early 2003, Blair auditioned for Neighbours and impressed casting director Jan Russ, but she was not cast. Russ contacted Blair six months later and asked her to audition for the role of Carmella Cammeniti. She was cast on the spot as producers needed to fill the gap left by Delta Goodrem's sudden departure. Blair started filming just after she graduated from school. She played Carmella on an recurring basis, before returning for a longer stint in 2004, and a brief return in 2005. That same year, she won the Logie Award for Most Popular New Female Talent at the 47th Annual Logie Awards. She also shot the horror thriller film Voodoo Lagoon alongside Beau Brady on the Gold Coast, before returning to Neighbours for another stint in 2006.

Blair signed a year long contract in September 2007. She was nominated in 2007 for both the Silver Logie and Gold Logie Award for Most Popular Personality on Australian Television. She was again nominated for both awards in 2008. Blair was crowned "Queen of Teen" at the Dolly Teen Choice Awards at Sydney's Luna Park in 2007. In December 2007, Blair starred in the Spillers Ltd Production of Snow White and the Seven Dwarfs as Snow White at the Music Hall in Shrewsbury. Blair also sang solo and a cappella the first verse of "Once in Royal David's City" at the annual BBC Shropshire "Carols in the Square" event in Shrewsbury on 19 December 2007.

Blair left Neighbours after five years in 2008. She then moved to Los Angeles, California, but returned home later that year to play chief villain Connie Burns in the feature film Stage Fright. Upon completion of the film, also starring Clare Bowen and Jason Smith, Natalie left Queensland and returned to Los Angeles.

Blair returned to Neighbours in March 2011 for two episodes. Also in March 2011, Natalie began shooting the feature film The Sleeping Warrior, portraying the character of Safia. The film was set for release in 2012. It is a story that connects Hindu spirituality and Australian aboriginal spirituality.

In 2012, Blair returned to Melbourne, Australia to play the lead in the romantic comedy The Groomless Bride. The film also stars underworld figure Chopper Reid.

== Personal life ==
In 2006, after meeting on the set of Voodoo Lagoon, Blair was engaged to actor Beau Brady for a year. They quietly separated in January 2007, with their split being confirmed by a Neighbours spokeswoman. The pair reportedly split due to Brady's decision to move to Los Angeles to pursue his career.

Blair began a relationship with her Neighbours co-star David Hoflin in 2008. The pair currently live together in Los Angeles. On 10 March 2012, Fiona Byrne of the Herald Sun reported the couple were engaged. They were married on 4 January 2013 in Warburton, Victoria. Blair gave birth to their first child, a son, in 2016. Their second child, a daughter was born on 16 July 2025.

== Filmography ==
=== Film ===
Year	Title	Role	Notes
2002	Hey Sista!	Roberta Russo	TV short film
2006	When Darkness Falls	Laura	Feature film
2006	Voodoo Lagoon (aka Hunt)	Kate	Feature film
2009	I.C.U.	The Mystery Woman	Feature film
2010	Stage Fright (aka 10 Days to Die)	Connie Burns	Feature film
2011	Like Crazy	Natalie	Feature film
2012	The Sleeping Warrior	Safia	Feature film
2012	Groomless Bride	Sandra	Unreleased film

=== Television ===
Year	Title	Role	Notes
1995	Flipper	Cuban Girl	Episode: "Kidnapped: Part 1"
1997	Medivac (aka Adrenalin Junkies)	Ghost Train Victim	Season 2, episode: "2.10"
2002	Sir Arthur Conan Doyle’s The Lost World	Keeran Warrior #2	Season 3, episode 10: "Brothers in Arms"
2003	Fat Cow Motel	Food Poison Girl	Episode: "1.8"
2003–2008; 2011	Neighbours	Carmella Cammeniti	342 episodes
2010	Outsourced	Sexy Witch	Season 1, episode 6: "Bolloween"
2014	Crossbones	Rose Dryden	7 episodes
2018	The Fo-Fo Figgily Show	Vivala Wee	25 episodes

== Stage ==
Year	Title	Role	Notes
2007	Snow White and the Seven Dwarfs	Snow White	Music Hall, Shrewsbury
2007	Carols in the Square	Singer	BBC Shropshire in Shrewsbury

== Awards & nominations ==
Year	Organisation	Category	Nominated work	Result
2005	Logie Awards	Most Popular New Female Talent	Neighbours	Won
2007	Logie Awards	Most Popular Actress	Neighbours	Nominated
2007	Logie Awards	Most Popular Personality on Australian Television	Neighbours	Nominated
2007	Dolly Teen Choice Awards	Queen of Teen Award	Neighbours	Won
2008	Logie Awards	Most Popular Actress	Neighbours	Nominated
2008	Logie Awards	Most Popular Personality on Australian Television	Neighbours	Nominated
