= Neighbours spin-offs =

Neighbours is a long-running Australian television soap opera created by television executive Reg Watson. It was first broadcast on the Seven Network on 18 March 1985 and aired until December 2025, most recently on digital channel 10 Peach. Since its inception, several spin-offs have been produced, including books, music, DVDs and internet webisodes. Several annuals and books by pulp fiction writer Carl Ruhen were released in the late 1980s and early 1990s. Barry Crocker's version of the theme tune was the first music release from the show, which also has included a Christmas album and the show's love theme. Two potential television spin-offs have reached the pilot stage, while five DVD box sets of Neighbours episodes from the beginning have been released. In 2013, Neighbours launched their first webisode series Steph in Prison. Several other webisode series have since been released. Other merchandise includes official video and board games, stationery and clothing.

== Books ==
Several fictional and non-fiction books about the show and its cast and characters have been released. During the 1980s, pulp fiction writer Carl Ruhen penned nine tie-in books. In 2005, four novellas based on characters from Neighbours were released. The books were available to buy at Australia Post outlets and on the internet. Three of the four books focussed on the post-Ramsay Street lives of Felicity (Holly Valance) and Michelle Scully (Kate Keltie), Libby Kennedy (Kym Valentine) and Darren Stark (Todd MacDonald), and Jack Scully (Jay Ryan) and Nina Tucker (Delta Goodrem). The fourth novel centred on Liljana (Marcella Russo) and David Bishop's (Kevin Harrington) early relationship. Of the books, a spokeswoman said "It's different to what happens in the show; it's more like a fantasy of what happens, might have happened, in the show, they would take about an hour to read if you're a quick reader".

=== Fiction ===
Title	Author	Year	Publisher	ISBN
Neighbours: 1	Carl Ruhen	1987	Horwitz Grahame	ISBN 978-1-85018-045-6
Neighbours: 2	Carl Ruhen	1987	Horwitz Grahame	ISBN 978-0-352-32149-7
Neighbours: 3	Carl Ruhen	1988	Horwitz Grahame	ISBN 978-0-352-32201-2
Neighbours: 4	Carl Ruhen	1988	Horwitz Grahame	ISBN 978-0-352-32284-5
Neighbours: 5	Carl Ruhen	1988	Horwitz Grahame	ISBN 978-0-352-32285-2
Neighbours: 6	Carl Ruhen	1988	Horwitz Grahame	ISBN 978-0-352-32379-8
Neighbours: 7	Carl Ruhen	1988	Horwitz Grahame	ISBN 978-0-352-32384-2
Neighbours: 8	Carl Ruhen	1989	Horwitz Grahame	ISBN 978-0-352-32424-5
Neighbours: 9	Carl Ruhen	1989	Horwitz Grahame	ISBN 978-0-352-32587-7
Neighbours: The Ramsays – A Family Divided	Valda Marshall and Ray Kolle	1989	Mandarin	ISBN 978-0-7493-0055-5
Neighbours: The Robinsons – A Family in Crisis	Valda Marshall	1989	Mandarin	ISBN 978-0-7493-0056-2
Facing Tomorrow	Ray Kolle	2005	Funtastic Publishing	ISBN 978-1-74150-848-2
Rising Star	Sarah Mayberry	2005	Funtastic Publishing	ISBN 978-1-74150-851-2
Sisters In The City	Sarah Mayberry	2005	Funtastic Publishing	ISBN 978-1-74150-850-5
Summer Harvest	Sarah Mayberry	2005	Funtastic Publishing	ISBN 978-1-74150-849-9

=== Non-fiction ===
Title	Author	Year	Publisher	ISBN
Neighbours Annual 1989	Brenda Apsley, Clive Hopwood and Neil Pemberton	1988	World International Publishing	ISBN 978-0-7235-6841-4
Neighbours: Behind the Scenes	James Oram	1988	Angus & Robertson	ISBN 978-0-207-16075-2
Neighbours	John Kercher	1989	Grandreams Books Limited	ISBN 978-0-86227-672-0
Neighbours Annual 1990	Clive Hopwood	1989	World International Publishing	ISBN 978-0-7235-6859-9
The Neighbours Factfile	Neil Wallis and Dave Hogan	1989	Angus & Robertson	ISBN 978-0-207-16382-1
Neighbours Annual 1991	Nicola Furlong and John McCready	1990	Hamlyn	ISBN 978-0-600-57045-5
Neighbours: The Playscripts	Alan Hopgood	1990	Heinemann	ISBN 978-0-85859-556-9
Neighbours Special	Clive Hopwood	1990	World International Publishing	ISBN 978-0-7235-6895-7
Neighbours Special	Kesta Desmond	1990	Grandreams Books Limited	ISBN 978-0-86227-775-8
Neighbours Annual 1992	Ian Morrison	1991	Hamlyn	ISBN 978-0-600-57311-1
The Neighbours Programme Guide	Josephine Monroe	1994	Virgin Books	ISBN 978-0-86369-831-6
Neighbours: The First 10 Years	Josephine Monroe	1996	Penguin Group	ISBN 978-0-7181-4212-4
Neighbours: 20 years of Ramsay Street	Tony Johnston	2005	News Custom Publishing	ISBN 978-1-876176-78-5

== Home media ==
Episodes of Neighbours have been released on several VHS and DVDs. The first ever Neighbours video was released in 1989 and contains three wedding episodes. In 2012, three DVD box sets featuring the early episodes of Neighbours were released in Germany. From April 2012, Shock Entertainment began releasing DVD box sets of Neighbours episodes in broadcast order from the beginning. As of October 2014, five box sets have been released.

=== VHS ===
Name	Release year	Distributor	Notes
The Neighbours Wedding Collection	1989	BBC Video	Contains episodes 295, 523 and 724.
Neighbours: The Scott & Charlene Love Story	1989	Virgin Video	Feature length montage of episodes focusing on Charlene and Scott Robinson.
Neighbours: How It All Began	1990	Virgin Video	Contains the first four episodes.
The Official Neighbours Special: The First Ten Years	1995	Game Entertainment	Compilation of memorable moments and interviews with the cast and crew.

=== DVD ===
Name	Episodes	DVD release dates		Notes
Name	Episodes	Region 2	Region 4	Notes
Neighbours: Defining Moments	15	22 September 2003	2002	Includes a photo gallery.
Neighbours: The Iconic Episodes Volume 1	23	10 November 2008	15 September 2007	Includes the 1000th episode party special and a photo gallery.
Neighbours: The Iconic Episodes Volume 2	24	1 June 2009	18 October 2007	One disc is dedicated to the character of Charlene.
Neighbours: From The Beginning Volume 1	56	24 September 2012	4 April 2012	Contains episodes 1–56
Neighbours: The Charlene Years Volume 1	63	8 October 2012	4 April 2012	Contains episodes 234–297
Neighbours: From The Beginning Volume 2	56	25 March 2013	7 November 2012	Contains episodes 57–112
Neighbours: From The Beginning Volume 3	56	2013	6 March 2013	Contains episodes 113–168
Neighbours: From The Beginning Volume 4	65	2013	5 June 2013	Contains episodes 169–233
Neighbours 30th: The Stars Reunite	—N/a	—	1 April 2015	Contains an additional 100 minutes of footage.

== Internet ==
Neighbours' official website is located at http://tenplay.com.au/channel-eleven/neighbours and is part of Tenplay, the official website of Network Ten and its sister channels One and Eleven. The website contains information on the cast and characters, news, interviews, photos and a catch-up service. UK broadcaster Channel 5 launched Holy Soap in June 2010 as the official UK website for both Neighbours and Home and Away. The website contained information about the cast and character profiles, and exclusive interviews. It also allowed viewers to watch full episodes of the shows. After the closure of Holy Soap, Channel 5 moved Neighbours to its new home at channel5.com.

In 2009, Neighbours became the first Australian series to establish Twitter accounts for four of its characters; Declan Napier, Donna Freedman, Ringo Brown and Zeke Kinski. The accounts sent daily updates to their followers, gave advice and talked to each other. The updates were "complementary to the show's on-air storylines" and FremantleMedia Enterprises vice-president of licensing Ben Liebmann believed it was a good way to get the audience to engage with the characters off-screen. The messages were overseen by the Fremantle digital team, which integrated with the story department of the Neighbours production team.

In December 2012, Neighbours launched Amber's Blog on the official website. It featured Amber Turner (Jenna Rosenow) documenting her family's move from Mount Isa to Erinsborough ahead of their debut on-screen. The website later used the character of Sheila Canning (Colette Mann) to document the week's events in a feature called "Sheila's Recap".

In 2014, Neighbours became the first Australian drama series to feature on-screen conversation-starter Twitter questions during each episode's three commercial breaks. The questions were tweeted during each broadcast from the official Neighbours Twitter account, accompanied by a relevant photo from the storyline. Tony Broderick, the head of TV Partnerships Australia, said "It's an impressive innovation from a TV series in its 30th season on air, and shows that the residents of Ramsay Street can still teach the television industry some new tricks." The on-screen conversation-starter Twitter questions were later removed. On 16 March 2015, in honour of the show's 30th anniversary, Channel 5 released a webisode titled Harold Bishop: The Musical, which sees cast members breaking into song to celebrate Harold's return. On 31 August, ahead of the show's first three-hander episode, a "digital-only bonus scene" was released featuring Brad Willis (Kip Gamblin) and Lauren Turner (Kate Kendall) discussing their feelings after they had sex.

A new online series, Neighbourshood, was launched on 7 March 2016. It is a behind-the-scenes show presented by former Neighbours actor Ben Nicholas. Episodes were uploaded to the official YouTube at the beginning of the week. A second 22-part series was commissioned in 2017. The format is similar to the previous series, with viewers meeting a different Neighbours cast member each week and shown various spoilers.

=== Webisodes ===
==== Steph in Prison ====
To coincide with Stephanie Scully's (Carla Bonner) return to Neighbours in April 2013, the serial released six webisodes on their YouTube channel that featured Steph talking to a psychiatrist (Trudy Hellier) before her release from jail. Steph talks through a variety of issues and explains that she is returning to Erinsborough for someone. The webisodes also provide an insight into Steph's actions upon her return. The webisodes were directed by former Neighbours actor Scott Major. He explained that being part of Steph's original exit storyline did not influence his approach to directing the webisodes. He decided to film the webisodes in a different style to show viewers what it was like in Steph's head. He said "I wanted viewers to be a little uncomfortable, make them feel they were intruding on these private conversations."

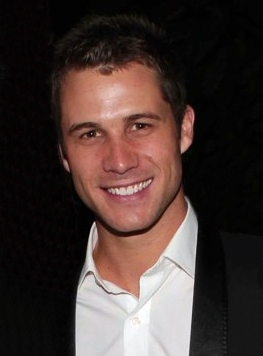
Scott McGregor's character was the focus of the second webisode series Brennan on the Run.

==== Brennan on the Run ====
Mark Brennan's (Scott McGregor) return to Neighbours in February 2014, was preceded by the webisode series Brennan on the Run, which focused on his time in witness protection. A trailer for the spin-off was also released. The webisodes were interactive, with viewers able to choose the outcome of the story and take control of Brennan "as he faces challenges, dodges danger and encounters a little bit of romance". Each webisode ended with a "yes" or "no" answer, which then took viewers to a different video in the style of a choose your own adventure. The webisodes were shot using a Red Scarlet camera by digital producer Ric Forster, which gave them "a different, edgier look and feel" compared to the main show. Mark's girlfriend in the spin-off, Sienna Matthews (Sarah Roberts), was later introduced to Neighbours. While his witness protection handler Greta Jackson (Alexis Porter) made an appearance in September 2014. In the same month, Brennan on the Run was shown at the Raindance Web Fest.

==== Neighbours vs Zombies ====
In March 2014, a new zombie webisode series was announced. Digital producer Ric Forster pitched the idea of a zombie series featuring former characters in 2013. Upon learning about Screen Australia's Skip Ahead programme, which gives help with funding and resources, Forster contacted YouTube vlogger Louna Maroun to join the project. Maroun commented "There's a huge fanbase for the zombie genre. It's so fresh and amazing that FremantleMedia are willing to do this sort of thing. It's just a fan dream." Forster wanted Neighbours: Zombies on Ramsay Street to be different from Neighbours, and said the visuals would reflect the dark nature of the story. Scenes were shot in both interior and external locations. An abandoned hospital and Kennedy bedroom sets were specially created for the series. Maroun appears as Hope Gottlieb, a former character who previously appeared in the show as a young child. The storyline sees Hope teaming up with Mason Turner (Taylor Glockner) to try and stop a zombie invasion.

On 18 September 2014, it was confirmed that Dan Paris had reprised his role as Drew Kirk for the series. Paris was reunited with his former co-stars Alan Fletcher and Jackie Woodburne who played Drew's in-laws Karl and Susan Kennedy. Of his return, Paris commented "This was just too much fun to pass up and it was great to see Alan and Jackie again, it was as if no time had passed – not unlike how a zombie feels I guess." On 15 October, it was announced that actors Ben Nicholas, Kevin Harrington and Aaron Jakubenko would reprise their roles as Stingray Timmins, David Bishop and Robbo Slade respectively. Many current cast members appear in the series including, Fletcher, Woodburne, Ryan Moloney (Toadfish Rebecchi), Josef Brown (Matt Turner), Jenna Rosenow (Amber Turner), Eve Morey (Sonya Mitchell), Stefan Dennis (Paul Robinson) and Calen Mackenzie (Bailey Turner). The five-part series made its debut on the Neighbours YouTube channel on 27 October.

James Brinsford for the Metro praised the series, saying "it is a fantastic coming together for Halloween and makes you wonder if it will catch on with British Soaps."

==== Hey Piper ====
Ahead of her first screen appearance on 16 September 2015, Piper Willis (Mavournee Hazel) was featured in a new series of webisodes, which see her making online video calls to members of her family. The first episode is set after the Erinsborough tornado (2014) and features Piper meeting her half-sister Paige Smith (Olympia Valance) for the first time. The second episode features a conversation between Piper and her grandfather Doug Willis (Terence Donovan). The last two episodes feature Piper talking to her father Brad about his affair with Lauren Turner and the state of his marriage.

==== Xanthe ♥ Ben ====
Xanthe ♥ Ben focuses on the new relationship between Xanthe Canning (Lily Van der Meer) and Ben Kirk (Felix Mallard) before and after an explosion at Lassiter's Hotel. The series ran for 20 episodes from 6 to 21 April on the official Neighbours Instagram account. Digital producer Ric Forster stated, "Xanthe ♥ Ben gives us an opportunity to tell the Neighbours story in a way that no other daily drama has done before. It's been both challenging and great fun in using a new medium and has the potential to reach a whole new audience."

==== Pipe Up ====
In August 2016, a new weekly web series titled Pipe Up began, which ran until April 2018. The series features Piper Willis discussing the issues that have affected her during the week. In the first episode, Piper talks about her feelings on Xanthe Canning's (Lilly Van der Meer) assault and how she tried to cheer her friend up. Further episodes have featured appearances by Xanthe, Ben Kirk (Felix Mallard), Tyler Brennan (Travis Burns), and Callum Rebecchi (Morgan Baker). Ariel Kaplan reprised her role of Piper's sister Imogen Willis for an episode filmed in London.

==== Road Trip ====
In September 2016, brothers David (Takaya Honda) and Leo Tanaka (Tim Kano) appeared in three webisodes ahead of their introduction to the main show. The series focuses on the brothers' road trip on the way to Erinsborough, where they were joined by Leo's friend and love interest Milly (Eliza Charley). The webisodes also give viewers a chance to look at David and Leo's "brotherly dynamic".

==== Summer Stories ====
Summer Stories (also known as Christmas Crackers) is a webisode series broadcast during the 2016 Christmas period. It fills the gap between the show's 2 December finale and the start of the new season on 9 January 2017. The episodes are around one to two minutes in length and were released on Tenplay and the Neighbours UK Facebook page. The series follows five storylines, which focus on Ben Kirk (Felix Mallard) and Xanthe Canning's (Lily Van der Meer) relationship problems after her mother scammed his grandfather, Amy Williams' (Zoe Cramond) attempts at dating, Karl Kennedy (Alan Fletcher) receiving help from Paul Robinson (Stefan Dennis) to cook Christmas lunch, Piper Willis (Mavournee Hazel) and Tyler Brennan (Travis Burns) keeping their relationship a secret while planning to be together on New Year's Eve, and finally Toadfish Rebecchi's (Ryan Moloney) reaction after learning that his wife Dee Bliss (Madeleine West) could be alive following her presumed death thirteen years ago.

==== Mrs Robinson ====
Mrs Robinson is four-part series that focuses on the relationship and subsequent engagement between Paul Robinson (Stefan Dennis) and Courtney Grixti (Emma Lane). The pair meet in an airport bar after they both decide to leave Erinsborough for a while. Paul and Courtney then choose to go to an island in Queensland together. The actors spent two days filming on Heron Island. Dennis admitted that he was excited to film on the island, as he had always wanted to go. He also revealed that the shoot avoided the show's "location filming curse", which causes the weather to turn bad when they film away from their studio in Nunawading. Dennis added "That's what I love about the web series, even though I'm still playing Paul Robinson and even though it's kind of Neighbours, it's also completely different so you get a chance to play, dipping our toes in something else."

==== Neighbours vs Time Travel ====
Neighbours vs Time Travel was the second web series released in 2017. It centres on Paul Robinson (Stefan Dennis) who travels back in time to 1985, the year in which Neighbours began. Paul accidentally changes years worth of history by offering business tips to his younger self, leading to "some alarming results!" The series also features various other characters whose lives have been changed, including Toadfish Rebecchi (Ryan Moloney), who is now a gangster, Karl Kennedy (Alan Fletcher), who is a successful musician, but no longer married to Susan Kennedy (Jackie Woodburne), and Tyler Brennan (Travis Burns), who is an emo vlogger. Actor Adz Hunter reprised his role as Paul's son Robert Robinson, who was last seen in 2007. Additionally, Ian Rawlings and Julie Mullins returned as 1990s series regulars Philip and Julie Martin, while Ben Nicholas reprised his role as Stingray Timmins. The first episode of the five-part series was released on 30 October 2017.

==== SheilaTV ====
SheilaTV was released on 21 December 2018, following the broadcast of the 8000th episode of Neighbours. The series is written by and stars Colette Mann and Geoff Paine, who play Sheila Canning and Clive Gibbons respectively. SheilaTV sees Sheila and Clive answering anonymous questions from their friends and neighbours, as part of a project for Sheila's media studies class.

==== Sheila & Clive ====
Sheila & Clive is a five-part series that sees Sheila Canning (Mann) and Clive Gibbons (Paine) talking to each other via video call, as they deal with a temporary long-distance relationship. The first episode was released early on 22 November 2019.

==== Robinson's Roundup ====
Robinson's Roundup (also Karl's Catch-up, Terese's Takeover, Susie K's Recap, Harris' Rehash, Brennan's Best Bits and The Roundup Takeover) is an online video series recapping the events of the preceding week's events on Neighbours, which began when Neighbours resumed in September 2023. The series was conceived by cast member Stefan Dennis and the show's digital producer. Short clips from Neighbours are presented to camera by Paul Robinson (Dennis), who is later joined by other cast members Leo Tanaka (Tim Kano), Karl Kennedy (Alan Fletcher), Terese Willis (Rebekah Elmaloglou), Susan Kennedy (Jackie Woodburne), Jane Harris (Annie Jones) and Aaron Brennan (Matt Wilson). The introductory material includes metatextual references, semi-improvised squabbles between the various characters and impressions of each other's characters.

Weekly episodes were uploaded to the Neighbours social media accounts, with the first season also uploaded to YouTube following its conclusion on 1 September 2024. The roundup concluded with a finale episode on 13 July 2025, in conjunction with the end of production on the main series.

== Music ==
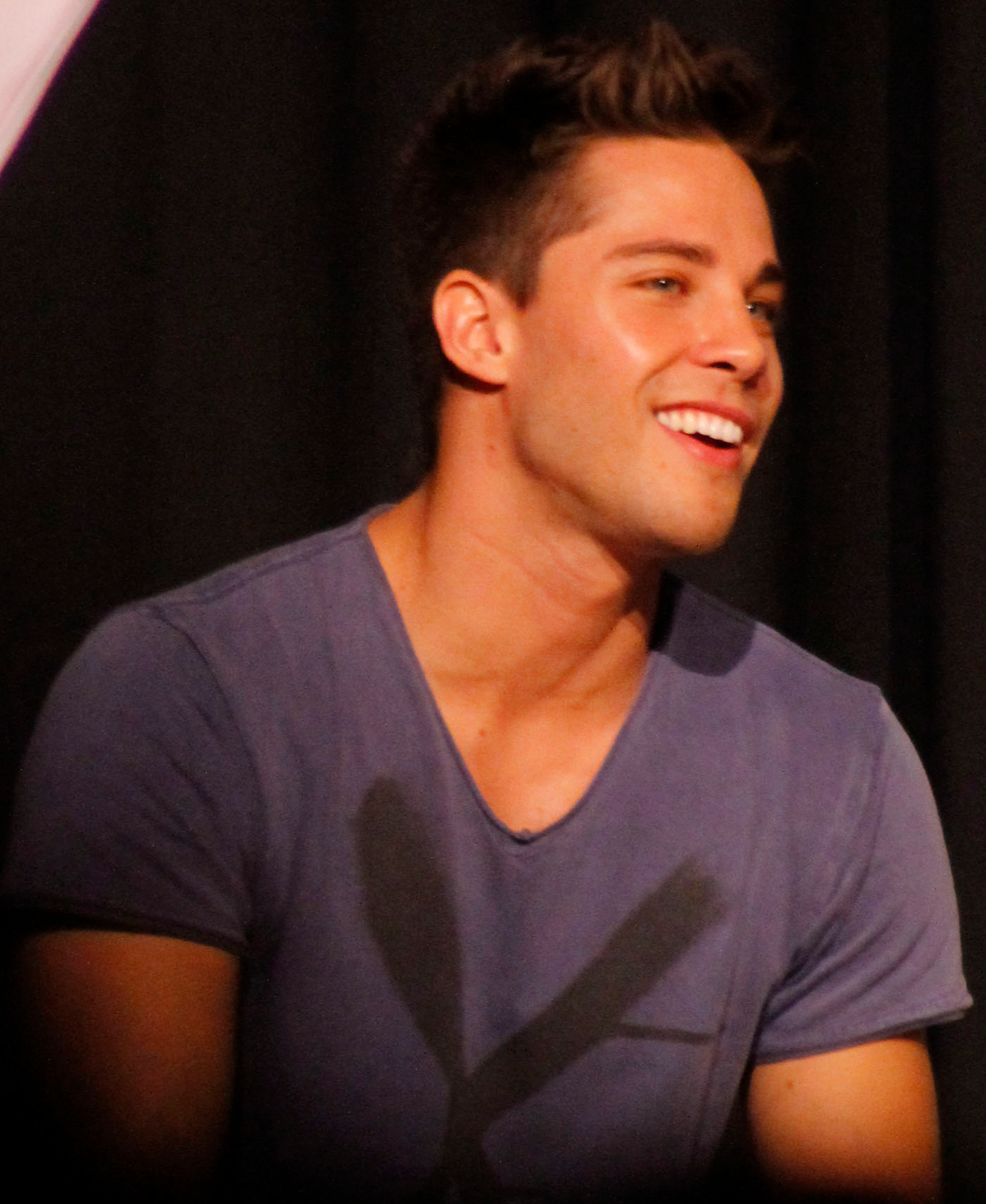
Dean Geyer penned the 2007 duet "Unforgettable", which was released as a download.

Several records were released in the 1980s. The Neighbours theme tune sung by Barry Crocker was released by BBC Records in 1988. It reached a peak of 84 on the UK Singles Chart. The Angry Anderson power ballad "Suddenly" which was featured in "Episode 523" was released in 1987, while the show's love theme "In Your Arms" by Lynne Hamilton was released in 1989. "Suddenly" was later covered by Sam Clark in 2010 for the show's 25th anniversary. Christmas With Your Neighbours is a collection of classic Christmas songs sung by the cast. It was released in 1989.

In 1999, Sarah Beaumont (Nicola Charles) and Peter Hannay's (Nick Carrafa) wedding theme song, "Flowers" by Janine Maunder, was made available to purchase from the Neighbours website. Neighbours: The Music is a compilation album released in 2002, that contains music used on the show as well as the 2002 version of the theme tune. A DVD was also released under the same name, and featured music videos from former Neighbours actors. Delta Goodrem used her role as aspiring singer Nina Tucker to showcase her song "Born to Try" in the show. Within weeks of it being performed, "Born to Try" became the number one single in Australia. In 2007, Caitlin Stasey and Dean Geyer performed a duet titled "Unforgettable" on Neighbours as their characters Rachel Kinski and Ty Harper. The track was written by Geyer and made available to download on iTunes.

In 2013, Saskia Hampele performed an original song titled "Letting You Know" on the show as her character Georgia Brooks and it was also released on iTunes. A new compilation album titled Neighbours: 30 Years was released in 2015 to celebrate the show's 30th anniversary.

== Television ==
Two television spin-offs have reached the pilot stage. After Clive Gibbons (Geoff Paine) became popular with viewers, his 1989 return to the show was scripted to set up a spin-off series City Hospital. A pilot was made, but it was not picked up by any television networks.

Following Caroline Gillmer's exit from Neighbours in 1996, she filmed a pilot episode for a sitcom based around her character Cheryl Stark, which was initially called In Cheryl's Arms. The sitcom's name was later changed to In Carol's Arms, as the networks thought the show needed "a different style" character. The pilot was well received, but it was not picked up.

In 2000 and 2001, the BBC produced two series of Neighbours Revealed in association with Lion Television. The ten half-hour episodes were presented by Anna Walker, and featured behind-the-scenes footage and interviews with cast and crew, including Dan Paris, Kym Valentine and Anne Charleston.

In 2015, a documentary titled Neighbours 30th: The Stars Reunite aired on Network Ten and Channel 5 to celebrate the show's 30th anniversary. The documentary featured current and former stars reminiscing about their time on the show. It was hosted by Stefan Dennis (Paul Robinson) and Tim Phillipps (Daniel Robinson).

A five-part series titled Neighbours: Erinsborough High was broadcast on the video-on-demand services My5 and 10Play in November 2019. The series centres on a group of students preparing for final exams, and the issues they are facing, including "bullying, mental illness, sexuality, cultural diversity, parental and peer pressure, and teacher-student relationships." It features regular characters from Neighbours, as well as new cast members. The cast includes Olivia Junkeer (Yashvi Rebecchi), Georgie Stone (Mackenzie Hargreaves), Lachlan Millar (Richie Amblin), Benny Turland (Hendrix Greyson), Grace O'Sullivan, and Darius Amarfio-Jefferson. The 22-minute episodes are directed by Jonathon Dutton and produced by Natalie Lynch.

In 2022, Viacom Studios UK produced two programmes for Channel 5's Neighbours finale night, with documentary Neighbours Made Me a Star: From Ramsay St to Hollywood and music clip show Neighbours: All the Pop Hits & More, Especially For You scheduled by British broadcaster for 29 July 2022.

== Other merchandise ==
A board game was released in 1988. The game sees players creating their own Neighbours storylines as they move around the board collecting story cards. A writer for Virgin Media named it one of the "weirdest and most wonderful TV board games". Other memorabilia includes, a card game, a series of Topps trading cards and stationery. Signed castcards are also available by writing to the cast members. Neighbours themed t-shirts are sold through the online store Mr Vintage.

In 1991, an officially licensed video game of Neighbours was created by Ian Copeland and developed by Zeppelin Games under their Impulze label for the ZX Spectrum, Commodore 64, Atari ST, and Amiga; it was re-released by Zeppelin in 1992 on budget price. In the game, the player took on the role of Scott Robinson (Jason Donovan) and had to skateboard around four courses.

As part of Neighbours' 30th anniversary celebrations, the Australia Post released a limited-edition trifold stamp pack featuring some of the show's most popular characters, including Harold and Madge Bishop (Ian Smith and Anne Charleston); Karl and Susan Kennedy (Alan Fletcher and Jackie Woodburne); Toadie and Sonya Rebecchi (Ryan Moloney and Eve Morey), Paul Robinson (Stefan Dennis) and Bouncer. The stamp pack became available to buy at participating Post Offices and on the Australia Post website from 24 February 2015.

In 2019, the Royal Australian Mint released an Australian one-dollar coin with a Neighbours theme. It was minted as part of the companies "Great Aussie Coin Hunt 1" series, a selection of alphabetical one dollar coins with each letter representing an Australian symbol. The N coin was dedicated to Neighbours and was complete with a Ramsay Street sign.
