= Take Me Home (Sam Clark album) =

Studio album by Sam Clark
- Released: 20 August 2010
- Recorded: 2009–2010
- Genre: Pop rock
- Label: PLW/MGM

Singles from Take Me Home
- 1. "Broken" Released: 13 November 2009; 2. "Send Me a Sign" Released: 22 April 2010; 3. "Devastated" Released: 30 July 2010

Take Me Home is the debut studio album by Australian singer, Sam Clark. The album contains the lead single, "Broken", the second single "Send Me a Sign" and the third, "Devastated". It was released digitally and physically on 20 August 2010.

== Background ==
In the second half of 2009, Clark took time off from filming Neighbours, to launch his music career and to work on songs for the album. He returned to the set in February 2010 and continued to work on both the album and the show. The album was set for a release on 13 August 2010, but it was delayed by a week so that a cover of Angry Anderson's "Suddenly" could be added. The song became famous after it was used during the wedding of characters, Charlene Mitchell (Kylie Minogue) and Scott Robinson (Jason Donovan) in 1987. Clark's version of the song was used in the soap's 5998th episode, which broadcast on 25 August 2010, as his character, Ringo Brown married Donna Freedman (Margot Robbie).

== Singles ==
- "Broken" is the lead single from, Take Me Home. It debuted on the ARIA Singles Chart at number fifty on 24 January 2010 A week later, it moved up to number thirty nine However, the single had made a better impact on other Australian charts including the Australian Singles Chart (chart only for Australian origin), where it has peaked at number eleven and the Australian Physical Singles Chart, where it peaked at number one
- "Send Me a Sign" is the second single released from, Take Me Home, released on 22 April 2010, and first premiered during an episode of Neighbours, where Clark sang it in character as Ringo Brown. The single failed to make an impact on the charts and had no physical release.
- "Devastated" is the third single released on 30 July 2010. On 22 August 2010, it debuted at number one on the Australian Physical Singles Chart

== Promotion ==
Before the release of the album, Clark had made some instore appearances for the release of his debut single "Broken", in shopping centres across Victoria, New South Wales, Queensland and South Australia In January 2010, Clark performed the single at Warner Bros. Movie World In February, he performed an acoustic version of the song on Australian TV program, The Circle Clark returned to Warner Bros. Movie World on 2 April 2010 to 5 April 2010, to perform the single again and also sign copies

Clark premiered his second single, "Send Me a Sign" during an episode of Neighbours, where he sang it in character as Ringo on 22 April 2010, the day of the single's release. In August 2010, Clark began a five-week national tour, visiting fifty schools across Australia to promote his third single, "Devastated", the album and to also talk about his commitment to giving blood as an ambassador for the Red Cross Blood Service.

== Track listing ==
1. "Never Should Have Left" – 3:27
2. "Devastated" – 3:31
3. "Save Us Tonight" – 3:41
4. "Broken" – 3:55
5. "Send Me a Sign" – 3:06
6. "Come So Far" – 4:19
7. "Lay Me Down – 3:53
8. "Catching Up" – 4:20
9. "Messenger" – 3:11
10. "Take Me Home" – 3:32
11. "Suddenly" – 3:21

== Release history ==
Region	Date	Format	Label	Catalogue
Australia	20 August 2010	CD, digital download	PLW Entertainment/MGM	PLW0102
