= Broken (Sam Clark song) =

Single by Sam Clark

from the album Take Me Home
- Released: 13 November 2009 (digital); 19 November 2009 (physical)
- Genre: Pop rock
- Length: 3:54
- Label: PLW Entertainment
- Songwriter: Paul Wiltshire
- Producer: Paul Wiltshire

Sam Clark singles chronology
"Broken" (2009)	"Send Me a Sign" (2010)

"Broken" is the debut single by Australian singer, Sam Clark's debut album, Take Me Home. The song was written and produced by Paul Wiltshire and was released digitally on 13 November 2009 and physically on 19 November

== Charts ==
Despite "Broken" being released in 2009, it debuted on the ARIA Singles Chart at number fifty on 24 January 2010 A week later, it moved up to number thirty nine However, the single had made a better impact on other Australian charts including the Australian Singles Chart (chart only for Australian origin), where it peaked at number eleven and the Australian Physical Singles Chart, where it peaked at number one The single also did well on the AIR Singles Chart (Australian Independent Charts), where it peaked at number four

Chart (2010)	Peak position
ARIA Singles Chart	39
Australian Singles Chart	11
Australian Physical Singles Chart	1
AIR Singles Chart	4

== Track listing ==
CD single
No.	Title	Length
1.	"Broken"	3:54
2.	"Don't Say It"
3.	"Catching Up"

Digital
No.	Title	Length
1.	"Broken"	3:54
2.	"Come So Far"	4:19

== Release history ==
Country	Date	Format
Australia	13 November 2009	Digital Download
Australia	19 November 2009	CD single
