= Suddenly (Angry Anderson song) =

1987 single by Angry Anderson

Single by Angry Anderson

from the album Beats from a Single Drum
- Released: July 1987
- Genre: Rock
- Length: 4:12; 3:50 (7-inch version)
- Label: Mushroom
- Songwriters: Angry Anderson; Andy Cichon; Kevin Beamish
- Producer: Kevin Beamish

Angry Anderson singles chronology
"Suddenly" (1987)	"Bound for Glory" (1990)

"Suddenly" is a song recorded by Australian singer Angry Anderson for his debut solo album, Beats from a Single Drum. The track was first released via Mushroom Records in Australia during July 1987. It was written by Anderson, Andy Cichon and Kevin Beamish, with the latter serving as the song's producer. "Suddenly" was used in the Australian soap opera Neighbours during an episode that featured the wedding of Scott Robinson (played by Jason Donovan) and Charlene Mitchell (played by Kylie Minogue). Minogue selected the track when asked by the producers to select a romantic song to be played during the episode. The song's release coincided with the broadcast, and it reached number two on the ARIA Singles Chart. "Suddenly" peaked at number three on the UK Singles Chart. In addition, the song was also charted in European countries such as Ireland, Belgium and the Netherlands. In 2012, Anderson stated that "Suddenly" is the best song he has ever written.

== Background and release ==
"Suddenly" was produced by Kevin Beamish and written by Angry Anderson, Andy Cichon and Beamish. It was recorded at Rhinoceros Studios in Sydney, Australia, for his debut solo album, Beats from a Single Drum. The song is a ballad that marked a departure from Anderson's usual heavy rock sound. He later reflected, "I've helped write some monster rock and roll songs, and I'm just as proud to take credit for co-writing a beautiful love song." In 2012, Anderson told a reporter from TV Week that "Suddenly" is the best song he has ever written. Anderson has stated that the song "is about a man coming to a point in his life when he says, 'I know who I am, and I don't mind revealing myself and being vulnerable.'" Another inspiration for the song's lyrics was Anderson's daughter, and being a good father. He later explained that "it was about our all-consuming love for our children. This song was liberating and was about what I was in the past and who I was about to become." A music video was filmed and released to promote the single. It featured various camera close-ups of Anderson's face.

The song was famously used in the Australian soap opera Neighbours during the characters Scott Robinson (Jason Donovan) and Charlene Mitchell's (Kylie Minogue) wedding. "Suddenly" was released via Mushroom Records in July 1987 to coincide with the broadcast of the wedding episode. One misconception about the song is that it was written especially for Neighbours, but Anderson wrote it long before its use on the show. Minogue was also partly responsible for selecting music to feature in the wedding episode. Mushroom Records also supplied music to Neighbours and gave her choices from their catalogue. Anderson has claimed that Minogue was "adamant" that "Suddenly" was used for the wedding. Anderson has stated that Minogue wanted to use the song because she understood its meaning and thought it was lyrically "beautiful." The episode's director, Rod Hardy, disliked the song after his producer, Reg Watson, finalised its use. Despite advising against its use, Hardy later reflected that "Suddenly" became a "huge hit" and has forever been synonymous with the wedding.

== Critical reception ==
Wendy Tuohy from The Age branded the song as "another el soppo effort from the now not-so-aggressive-but-still-relatively-tough Mr Anderson." She opined that it sounded like a cross between a Joan Sutherland and Frankie Avalon song. Tuohy added that he sings "oozingly" over piano music and what she thought was the Melbourne Symphony Orchestra. She concluded this "could be the doughy result of too much head-banging." Rod Quinn from the publication branded it a "romantic ballad." Writing for Metro, Jon O'Brien said that Anderson's "ridiculously bombastic power ballad Suddenly proved to be the perfect fit" for the Neighbours wedding episode. Thomas Mitchell from TV Week branded it a "nostalgic power ballad."

Ben Fenion from HuffPost's positive review stated that "the song that has those who know it lip-synching and air-grabbing for their lives." Kevin Wuench from the Tampa Bay Times described "Suddenly" as an "uncharacteristic power ballad" for Anderson, adding that it was a "soap opera hit." The song's legacy saw it become a popular wedding song. In 2011, it was featured on the Now! series release titled "Now That's What I Call a Wedding!", a compilation of famous wedding songs.

== Chart performance ==
"Suddenly" entered Australia's ARIA Charts at number thirty-four. It peaked at number two on the chart in its fourth week. The song spent sixteen consecutive weeks on the chart's top forty. Twenty million viewers in the United Kingdom watched the Neighbours episode it featured in. It was released in the UK as a 7" vinyl single via Food for Thought records. It also featured a B-side track titled "Falling". It subsequently charted at number three on the UK Singles Chart and spent thirteen weeks there. Its success saw Anderson perform the song live on the BBC's Top of the Pops in December 1988. Following its release in Ireland, the song peaked at number three and spent seven weeks on the chart. In 1989, the song peaked at thirty-one in Belgium and sixty-nine in the Netherlands.

== Track listings ==
- Australian and UK 7" single
1. "Suddenly" – 3:50
2. "Falling" – 4:20
- Austrian 7" single
1. "Suddenly" – 4:04
2. "Winni Mandela" – 4:48

== Charts ==
=== Weekly charts ===
Weekly chart performance for "Suddenly"
Chart (1987–1989)	Peak position
Australia (Australian Music Report)	2
Belgium (Ultratop 50 Flanders)	31
New Zealand (RIANZ)	11
Ireland (IRMA)	3
Netherlands (Nationale Top 100)	69
UK Singles (OCC)	3

=== Year-end charts ===
Year-end chart performance for "Suddenly"
Chart (1987)	Position
Australia (Australian Music Report)	13

Chart (1988)	Position
UK Singles (OCC)	16

== Certifications ==
Certifications for "Suddenly"
Region	Certification	Certified units/sales
United Kingdom (BPI)	Gold	500,000^{^}
^{^} Shipments figures based on certification alone.

== Cover versions ==
The Australian singer Sam Clark covered the song for his first studio album, Take Me Home. Clark's version was used in Neighbours episode 5998 broadcast on 25 August 2010 (13 October 2010 in the UK), as his character, Ringo Brown, married Donna Freedman (Margot Robbie). Clark released his version of "Suddenly" in the United Kingdom as a double A-side with "Devastated".
