= Neighbours: The Music =

Soundtrack album by Various artists
- Released: 2003
- Genre: Rock/Pop
- Label: Sony Records

Neighbours: The Music is a soundtrack album to the Australian soap opera Neighbours. It was released in Australia in 2003 on a dual disc CD and DVD set.

== Background and release ==
"Neighbours: The Music" was released via Sony Records and features an audio CD with seventeen tracks, plus a DVD containing ten videos.

== Track listing ==
Neighbours: The Music – Disc one (Audio)
No.	Title	Performer(s)	Length
1.	"Neighbours Theme"	Janine Maunder
2.	"Born to Try"	Delta Goodrem
3.	"Lie"	Unknown
4.	"Way Love's Supposed to Be"	Selwyn
5.	"One Good Reason"	Michael Kelly
6.	"Stop Calling Me"	Shakaya
7.	"Flowers"	Janine Maunder
8.	"Three Dimensions"	Something For Kate
9.	"What Now, My Friend?"	Janine Maunder
10.	"He Don't Love You"	Human Nature
11.	"Won't You Be"	Unknown
12.	"Takin' Back What's Mine"	Leah Haywood
13.	"4 Your Love"	Unknown
14.	"Afterwords (You're So Right)"	Endorphin
15.	"Miracle"	Grundy
16.	"Hard"	Stella One Eleven
17.	"Sea of Love"	Grundy

Neighbours: The Music – Disc two (Visual)
No.	Title	Performer(s)	Length
1.	"Kiss Kiss (Wise Buddah Mix)"	Holly Valance
2.	"Born to Try"	Delta Goodrem
3.	"Locomotion"	Kylie Minogue
4.	"He Don't Love You"	Human Nature
5.	"Too Many Broken Hearts"	Jason Donovan
6.	"Mona"	Craig McLachlan & Check 1-2
7.	"Don't It Make You Feel Good"	Stefan Dennis
8.	"Mad If You Don't"	Gayle Blakeney And Gillian Blakeney
9.	"Suddenly"	Angry Anderson
10.	"Especially for You"	Kylie Minogue & Jason Donovan

== Reception ==
Cameron Adams of the Herald Sun gave Neighbours: The Music three stars out of five. He advised skipping the CD, quipping "hearing Selwyn would drive vegetarian Harold Bishop to steak". But he recommended the DVD, stating "There's a bogan Kylie, and Holly Valance naked in two videos – one showering away the filth of appearing in a Human Nature clip. Elsewhere, there's Delta, Jason, Craig McLachlan, not-so-wonderful twins Gayle and Gillian (above) and Stefan Dennis's truly noxious 'Don't it Make You Feel Good', soap pop's absolute low point."
