= Scott Robinson and Charlene Mitchell =

Fictional couple from the soap opera Neighbours

Scott Robinson and Charlene Mitchell are fictional characters and a supercouple from the Australian soap opera Neighbours. Scott was portrayed by Jason Donovan, and Charlene was portrayed by Kylie Minogue.

== Development ==
Scott Robinson is one of Neighbours' twelve original characters conceived by Reg Watson. He was originally played by Darius Perkins, but following his dismissal from the role, it was recast to Jason Donovan, who made his debut in January 1986, as the serial moved to Network Ten. In April of that year, Kylie Minogue was introduced as Charlene Mitchell, daughter of established character Madge Ramsay (Anne Charleston). Her arrival coincided with Ten's efforts to publicise and revamp the serial to appeal to its strong teen demographic. Scott was the first character to interact with Charlene, as he mistakes her for a burglar and confronts her. Charlene then punches Scott in the mouth. Minogue ended up punching Donovan for real during the filming of the scene. Producers soon created a relationship story arc for the characters. Andrew Mercado, author of Super Aussie Soaps, wrote that Neighbours would have been "dead in the water" if it had not capitalised on the popularity of Donovan and Minogue. Their characters' relationship helped boost ratings, and the show's publicist Brian Walsh used their rumoured off-screen romance to continue the rating success.

Minogue thought the romance between Scott and Charlene also helped them become fan favourites. She explained, "In the storyline, they break up and get back together. People like Scott and Charlene being a couple. It's probably the most normal relationship in the show." TV Week's Kelly Bourne also noted that Scott and Charlene had struck a chord with fans, who felt that they could identify with them and share their "joys, the pain of their fights and their fears of breaking up." Bourne also observed that viewers were "keenly" following the development of how a scripted romance led to Minogue and Donovan's real-life relationship. On-screen, as their romance progresses, Charlene's mother tries to persuade her to date other boys, while Scott repeats his final year of school. He realises that he wants to be with Charlene and the characters were seen declaring their love for each other. Scott also declares that they will move in together and buys Charlene a gold friendship ring. Minogue said Charlene is flattered by the gesture, while Donovan thought it settled the matter that they are not going to break up. Various characters voice their shock and disapproval at how serious the couple have become in 12 months.

In May 1987, Australian television magazine TV Week ran a competition asking for reader's opinions on the controversial issue of whether the teen couple should live together. The publication thought the plot development would provoke a heated response from fans of the show, and wanted to know if they felt strongly for or against the idea. The magazine received thousands of responses and 70 per cent were in favour of seeing the couple live together. But there was concern about Scott and Charlene's ages, which, at the time, were seventeen and eighteen respectively. A critic suggested that their parents should give them "a firm smack on the backside with orders to grow up." Minogue thought the characters were a bit young to be living together, but she did not see anything morally wrong with it. She explained, "Viewers should not see the live-in relationship as sinful because we are really trying to prove how difficult life is for teenagers when they leave the security of their parents' home." Donovan had friends who were living together, and he thought it was "a very true picture of today's teenagers." After "stuffier viewers" expressed their outrage about the young, unwed couple moving in together, producers decided the couple would marry instead.

The wedding allowed a discussion about teenage sexuality, and Donovan pointed out that since AIDS, there had been "a swing back" to romance and institutionalised relationships. Minogue thought the marriage would bring controversial subjects, such as pre-marital sex and AIDS, into focus. Scott and Charlene's wedding episode was broadcast on 1 July 1987 to two million Australian viewers. The episode aired in the UK on 8 November 1988, and was watched by 20 million viewers. Minogue said the wedding was what Scott and Charlene's romance had been building up to. While Donovan said the producers thought a wedding would be "the perfect climax" to the character's relationship, as well as an instant ratings winner. As the couple went away on honeymoon, Donovan and Minogue toured Australia to promote the wedding and Neighbours. Their appearances caused riots among fans.

In 2014, Scott and Charlene's son, Daniel Robinson (Tim Phillipps), was introduced to Neighbours. Phillipps confirmed that Scott and Charlene are still together and living in Brisbane. He said they were "really loving, supportive parents" to Daniel and his sister, Madison Robinson (Sarah Ellen), who was introduced in 2016. To prepare for the role, Ellen watched footage of Scott and Charlene, and thought her character shared a number of similarities to her mother.

Following the planned cancellation of Neighbours in March 2022, both Donovan and Minogue reprised their roles as Scott and Charlene for what was then thought to be the serial's finale. They filmed their guest appearance on Pin Oak Court, which is the outdoor location for Ramsay Street. Of their return, executive producer Jason Herbison stated: "Scott and Charlene are the ultimate Neighbours couple and it would not feel right to end the show without them. We are thrilled that Jason and Kylie have come home to play a very special part in our series finale. It has been an emotional experience for them, for us and I'm sure it will be for our viewers."

== Storylines ==
Scott meets Charlene when he mistakes her for an intruder at his neighbour Madge Ramsay's house. He soon remembers that Charlene is Madge's daughter, who has just arrived from Queensland. After an initially rocky start, the two develop a relationship despite the respective opposition of their two families, the Ramsays and the Robinsons, who have been feuding for years. The two get engaged and marry. Their marriage is tested by financial struggles and infidelity. Charlene is offered a mechanic apprenticeship in Brisbane, and her grandfather Dan Ramsay (Syd Conabere) buys the couple a house there. Charlene is forced to leave without Scott, who has to stay behind and wait for a job transfer. He joins her ten months later. They later two have children; a son, Daniel and a daughter, Madison, respectively and return to Erinsborough themselves more than thirty years later for a street party following the wedding of Toadfish Rebecchi (Ryan Moloney) and Melanie Pearson (Lucinda Cowden). They visit their old marital home, Number 24 Ramsay street, reunite with old friends Mike Young (Guy Pearce) and Jane Harris (Annie Jones) and also reconnect with Charlene's stepfather, Harold Bishop (Ian Smith) and Scott's brother, Paul (Stefan Dennis).

== Reception and impact ==
The couple were hugely popular with Neighbours fans in both Australian and the United Kingdom, helping the show to gain high ratings after an initial rocky start. Melissa Field of TV Week said their "teenage love story captured hearts across the world" and she noted that viewers in Australia and the UK "couldn't get enough of their wholesome love". Eleanor Sprawson and Robert Fidgeon of the Herald Sun included Scott and Charlene in their list of the Top 50 TV characters. They stated "Acid-wash jeans and mullet cut did not stop Neighbours' feisty mechanic-next-door from winning Scott's heart in the definitive soapie love match of the '80s."

Scott and Charlene have been named one of television's best couples by a number of media outlets. Keith Shar of Stuff.co.nz called Scott and Charlene "the show's most famous couple". A reporter for The Daily Telegraph branded them "a supercouple and a bit of a Romeo and Juliet as their two families had an ongoing feud." Heart Radio placed them at number one on their list of Iconic TV Soap Couples, saying "Everyone's favourite teenage sweethearts had us rooting for them throughout their time together in the Australian soap. Heartthrob Scott Robinson and the gorgeous Charlene Mitchell go through their fair share of teething problems as any young couple do, but go on to get hitched and going on to having two kids together."

Writing for BBC Online, Fraser McAlpine included Scott and Charlene in his feature on 30 years of much-loved TV couples, written shortly after Minogue and Donovan sang their duet "Especially for You" at 2018 Radio 2 Live in Hyde Park. McAlpine called them "one of television's most iconic romantic pairings". He also wrote: "They were too young to handle their feelings, the archetypal teenage couple who found it hard to control the avalanche of emotions they were exposed to. Scott had to fend off pressure from his family to put his education first, while Charlene was a trainee mechanic with a short fuse and very little patience. Their arguments were frequent, the bickering constant, but through it all they formed a lasting bond."

The couple inspired the name of Australian indie rock band Scott & Charlene's Wedding. Singer-songwriter Craig Dermody explained: "I remember sitting down and watching it with my mum. I just watched it as a kid and then stopped watching it. I remember [the wedding] being massive, it was as if it was a real wedding. Like a royal wedding, but in Australia." In 2014, the couple's wedding came first in a poll to find 50 unforgettable moments in Network Ten's history. Siobhan Duck of the Herald Sun wrote "No moment in Network Ten's 50-year history has made more of an impact on Australia than the 1987 wedding of a pair of teenage bogans. To the strains of Angry Anderson's Suddenly, a young Charlene (Kylie Minogue) clad in the laciest gown that the 1980s had to offer, married her golden mullet-haired groom, Scott (Jason Donovan) before a riveted nation."

In 2020, the couple's wedding was voted 5th "most unforgettable moment in Australian TV history" by readers of The Guardian. Writing for the same newspaper, Anna Spargo-Ryan included the couple in her list of the 10 best characters, admitting that she felt some "peer pressure" to have them on the list. She also stated "Scott and Charlene are the beating heart of Neighbours! They are the reason Erinsborough exists! No woman had ever been a mechanic before Kylie Minogue arrived on the street. Here's my proposition: Scott and Charlene only work as a couple. They're your co-dependent Facebook friend with a name like 'BenAnd SarahJones'. Yes, adorable teenagers in love, but we have Baz Luhrmann for that. More drama, please."

== See also ==
- List of supercouples
