= Neighbours 30th: The Stars Reunite =

2015 Australian television documentary

- Region 4 DVD cover
- Genre: Documentary
- Presented by: Stefan Dennis; Tim Phillipps
- Country of origin: Australia
- Original language: English

Production
- Producers: Kylie Speer; Stephen O'Leary; Matt Field; Albert Sharpe
- Editors: Ash Cameron; Ben Eriksen; Katy Morris
- Running time: 90 minutes
- Production company: FremantleMedia Australia

Original release
- Network: Network Ten; Eleven
- Release: 16 March 2015

Neighbours 30th: The Stars Reunite is a 2015 Australian television documentary, which celebrates 30 years of the soap opera Neighbours. It first aired on Network Ten and Eleven on 16 March 2015, two days before the show celebrated its 30th anniversary. Hosted by actors Stefan Dennis and Tim Phillipps, the documentary features current and former cast members reminiscing about their time on the show and their favourite memories. The results of a poll to find viewers' top five favourite Neighbours moments are also revealed. The documentary received mostly positive reviews from critics, but underperformed in the Australian ratings.

== Overview ==
Producers FremantleMedia Australia confirmed in November 2014 that a special show celebrating Neighbours' 30th anniversary would air on Network Ten in March 2015. The following month, it was announced that the special would be a 90-minute documentary. Michael Lallo of The Sydney Morning Herald confirmed former co-stars Kylie Minogue, Jason Donovan and Guy Pearce would be involved. Network Ten's drama chief Rick Maier commented that the documentary includes scenes from the show and "an affectionate nod" to Labrador Retriever Bouncer. It also clears up some myths about the show's ratings after its move from Channel Seven to Network Ten.

Neighbours 30th: The Stars Reunite is hosted by cast members Stefan Dennis and Tim Phillipps. It features interviews with current and former Neighbours actors, as they share memories about their time on the show and the impact Neighbours has had on their careers. Series producer Jason Herbison said the documentary was "a celebration of Neighbours past and present" and provides viewers with an insight into the show and its success. The documentary features a look back at the beginning of Neighbours in the 1980s, its appeal to viewers, its overseas success, the weddings, scandals, deaths and dramatic moments. Minogue, Donovan and Pearce's original audition tapes are also included. Neighbours 30th: The Stars Reunite concludes with the results of a poll to find Australian and UK fans' top five favourite moments.

=== Top five favourite Neighbours moments ===
1. Scott and Charlene's wedding (1987)
2. Toadie and Dee car crash (2003)
3. Plain Jane Super Brain makeover (1986)
4. Harold back from the dead (1996)
5. The plane crash (2005)

== Cast ==
The present and former cast members involved are:

- Natalie Bassingthwaighte (Izzy Hoyland)
- Ashleigh Brewer (Kate Ramsay)
- Anne Charleston (Madge Bishop)
- Lucinda Cowden (Melanie Pearson)
- Jason Donovan (Scott Robinson)
- Terence Donovan (Doug Willis)
- Alan Fletcher (Karl Kennedy)
- Delta Goodrem (Nina Tucker)
- Annie Jones (Jane Harris)
- Paul Keane (Des Clarke)
- Mark Little (Joe Mangel)
- Daniel MacPherson (Joel Samuels)
- Scott McGregor (Mark Brennan)
- Craig McLachlan (Henry Ramsay)
- Kylie Minogue (Charlene Robinson)
- Ryan Moloney (Toadfish Rebecchi)
- Tom Oliver (Lou Carpenter)
- Guy Pearce (Mike Young)
- Margot Robbie (Donna Freedman)
- Ian Smith (Harold Bishop)
- Olympia Valance (Paige Smith)
- Jackie Woodburne (Susan Kennedy)

== Broadcast and DVD ==
Neighbours 30th: The Stars Reunite was broadcast in Australia on Network Ten and Eleven on 16 March 2015. It aired in the UK on 18 March on Channel 5. In New Zealand, the documentary was broadcast on TV2 on 21 March.

Neighbours 30th: The Stars Reunite was released on Region 4 DVD on 1 April 2015. The DVD release contains an additional 100 minutes of footage.

== Reception ==
Neighbours 30th: The Stars Reunite was watched by 429,000 Australian viewers. Even though it was simulcast on two channels, it failed to reach the Top 20 and underperformed in the demos, despite promotion and having trended on Twitter during the night. In the UK, the documentary was seen by 789,000 viewers, a 5.7% share of the 10pm audience.

The documentary received mostly positive reviews from television critics. Ben Pobjie from The Sydney Morning Herald praised the show and observed, "The interviews with ex-Erinsboroughites are fun – particularly when McLachlan gets back into his old overalls – but the best bits are the memories aroused by the old clips." Another reporter for the same publication also praised the documentary, commenting "This is great". David Knox from TV Tonight rated the episode 3 1/2 stars out of five, and said "the special does nicely balance sentiment, cheekiness, colloquial attitudes and true blue soap. I would happily give the show 5 stars for what it has achieved in the industry, but on this occasion as a review for a one hour special will have to settle for slightly less. That said, this is a pretty lovely valentine." Cameron Adams of the Herald Sun made it his "Don't Miss" show of the day, and commented "This doco will give any Neighbours fan the feels".

Alana Wulff for TV Week chose the documentary for her "Pick of the day", branding it "worth the wait". Wulff added that the best part was not seeing the memorable scenes, but the actors being "genuinely excited" about the 30th anniversary. A reporter for the Herts & Essex Observer chose the documentary as one of their top 5 shows to watch on 18 March, commenting "Look Out For: Many flashbacks of superstars-in-waiting and much loved cast members." Terry Ramsey from The Daily Telegraph gave it three out of five stars. He thought it was a chance to have some fun, writing "despite a routine format – archive clips plus interviews with stars – this tribute show galloped through 30 years with a smile on its face." The Guardian's Phil Harrison chose the show as part of the publication's "best TV" feature.
