= Episode 523 (Neighbours) =

- Neighbours episode
- Episode no.: Episode 523
- Directed by: Rod Hardy
- Written by: Ray Harding
- Original air date: 1 July 1987

Guest appearances
- Syd Conabere as Dan Ramsay; Jessica Noad as Edna Ramsay; Anne Scott-Pendlebury as Hilary Robinson; Howard Bell as Reverend Sampson; Guy May as David Turner

Episode chronology
← Previous; Episode 522	Next → Episode 524

"Episode 523" is the 523rd episode of the Australian soap opera Neighbours. It premiered on Network Ten on 1 July 1987. The episode was written by Ray Harding, directed by Rod Hardy, and executively produced by the serial's creator Reg Watson. Episode 523 focuses on the wedding of popular couple Scott Robinson and Charlene Mitchell (portrayed by Jason Donovan and Kylie Minogue). The storyline was devised by the producers after some viewers became outraged by the idea of an unwed couple moving in together. They also believed that the wedding would be "the perfect climax" to the character's long-running relationship and an instant ratings hit.

The episode was filmed in secrecy and with a limited budget three months before it was broadcast. The wedding ceremony was filmed in the nave of The Holy Trinity Church in Doncaster. Episode 523 is one of only a few Neighbours episodes to include the entire cast. A new romantic style wedding dress made from ivory silk, organza and chantilly lace was made for Minogue's character. The ballad "Suddenly", which was written and sung by Angry Anderson, was chosen as the theme to the episode. Prior to its broadcast, Minogue and Donovan promoted the episode by making several appearances at shopping centres around Australia.

Episode 523 became one of the most watched soap opera episodes upon its broadcast in Australia. When it aired in the United Kingdom in November 1988, it attracted an audience of 19.6 million, making it the third most watched programme in the country that year. The episode was well received by critics and viewers. TV Week's Kelly Bourne stated that the wedding would be the most exciting television soap opera event of 1987, while Network Ten's head of drama thought it was "a major turning point for Neighbours". The wedding has been voted one of the most memorable soap moments and is often included in lists featuring the greatest television weddings of all time.

== Plot ==
The episode opens with Hilary Robinson (Anne Scott-Pendlebury) bringing breakfast to newlyweds Paul (Stefan Dennis) and Gail Robinson (Fiona Corke). She is surprised to find that they have spent the night in separate bedrooms. To hide the fact that they only married for business purposes, Gail tells Hilary that she and Paul had an argument the night before. Hilary tells them to sort things out and she tends to the bouquets. At the Robinson house, Scott (Jason Donovan) begins to panic about getting married, while his father, Jim (Alan Dale), and best friend, Mike Young (Guy Pearce), set up tables for the reception. Meanwhile, Lucy Robinson (Sasha Close) tries to find her pet mice. Over at the Ramsay house, Scott's fiancée, Charlene (Kylie Minogue), is getting ready. Her mother, Madge (Anne Charleston), asks her brother Henry (Craig McLachlan) not to race up the altar. Hilary brings in the wedding bouquet, while Charlene's friend and bridesmaid, Jane (Annie Jones), arrives. After receiving a blue garter from her grandmother, Charlene becomes excited about the wedding. Scott arrives at the church with Mike, Paul and Jim. He is greeted by his old school friends, and Mike explains that he and Jane arranged for them to attend to make up for the absence of Charlene's extended family.

After the guests take their seats, Scott starts to worry that Charlene will not show up, but Paul and Mike assure him that she will be there. The Rev Mr Sampson (Howard Bell) then invites everyone to stand as Charlene and Henry begin their walk up the aisle. Scott and Charlene exchange vows and the Rev Mr Sampson pronounces them husband and wife. At the reception, Jim tells Scott that he is proud of him and welcomes Charlene to the family. Harold Bishop (Ian Smith) finds Madge crying in the kitchen and he comforts her. They are interrupted by Mrs. Mangel (Vivean Gray) who informs them that the telegrams from Max and Maria, Clive and Rosemary, who all are unable to attend, are being read out. Dan Ramsay (Syd Conabere) spots a mouse and tries to pick it up, but hits Mrs. Mangel's foot. She accuses Dan of groping her and as he protests his innocence, an argument breaks out among the guests. Scott and Charlene go to his bedroom and Gail brings them a gift from her father. Jane comes to tell Charlene that it is time to get changed for the honeymoon, while Paul takes their bags out to the car. Lucy tells Scott that she will miss him and he gives her his skateboard. Everyone gathers in the street to wave the couple off. Mrs. Mangel catches Charlene's bouquet, as the couple drive out of Ramsay Street.

== Production ==
=== Conception ===
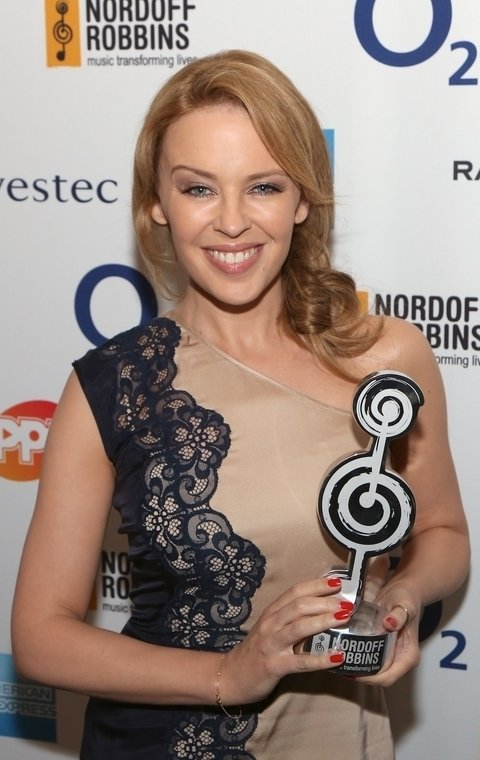
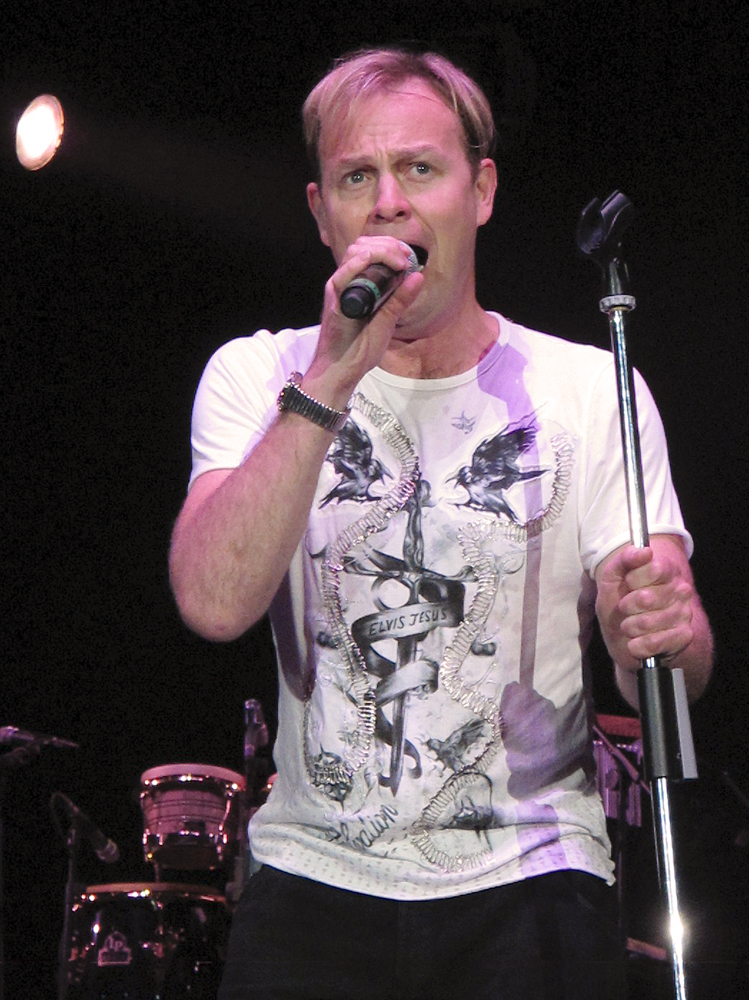
Kylie Minogue (left) and Jason Donovan (right) portrayed Charlene Mitchell and Scott Robinson, respectively.

By 1987, Scott Robinson (Jason Donovan) and Charlene Mitchell (Kylie Minogue) had become a popular couple with Neighbours viewers, who dubbed them "TV's Romeo and Juliet" because they were from feuding families. Following months of dating, Scott asked Charlene to move in with him. After "stuffier viewers" became outraged at the idea of the unwed couple moving in together, the producers decided that they should get married instead. Donovan recalled that the producers thought a wedding would be "the perfect climax" to Scott and Charlene's long-running relationship, as well as an instant ratings winner.

Speaking to James Oram, author of Neighbours: Behind the Scenes, Minogue thought the marriage would bring controversial subjects, such as pre-marital sex and HIV/AIDS, into focus. Donovan agreed, saying there was "a valid moral point behind it". Executive producer Reg Watson noted how each character in the show expressed a different point of view about the wedding. Some, such as Scott's father, Jim (Alan Dale), thought it was "stupid" for a couple just out of school to get married, while others, such as Charlene's mother, Madge (Anne Charleston), believed it was romantic. Watson believed the storyline would have repercussions for everyone. Ray Harding wrote the script for Episode 523. Bruce Andrews from Charles Sturt University noted that it is one of only a few Neighbours episodes to include the entire cast.

=== Filming ===
The serial's producers asked Rod Hardy to direct the episode, owing to his experience of directing other television weddings. The episode was shot "in great secrecy" three months before it was broadcast on Australian television. The shoot was initially delayed owing to bad weather. Owing to a limited budget, there were very few extras on set and crew were asked to stand in at the church instead. Minogue found the shoot "very tiring", as she had to walk up and down the aisle twenty times and she felt constricted by the wedding gown as filming went on. Minogue said there was "little chance" of her treating the wedding as anything but work, but added that it was "a good day". Recalling his experience of the shoot, Donovan told Nui Te Koha of the Herald Sun: "I don't remember that particular day well, but when you do set ups like weddings it takes a long, long time to put things together".

The Holy Trinity Church in Doncaster was used as the location for the wedding ceremony. The scenes were shot in the old nave of the church. Liz Guiver, the former vicar's secretary and administrator, revealed that many of the church's parishioners were excited at the prospect of seeing the actors on set. Speaking to Guy Blackman from The Age, Guiver recalled: "The person who played the vicar, and wore the vicar's robe, he smoked cigarettes, so we had to be careful that they were dry-cleaned before services on Sunday. Then we waited for months until the episode was aired, and most parishioners were glued to the set." Scenes featuring the characters' family homes and Ramsay Street were shot at the show's studio in Forest Hill and at Pin Oak Court in Vermont South, respectively. The wedding scenes were shot in soft focus, creating "a halo effect" around Charlene as she walked up the aisle. Hardy believed that "the magic of the episode" is captured best in two close-up shots of Scott and Charlene. The director recalled: "The image that stays with me is the close-up of Kylie as she arrives and then the close-up on Jason's face, and those two looks epitomised what the whole scene was about."

=== Costumes and music ===
Charlene's new romantic style wedding dress was designed and made by Isis of Melbourne, a local bridal salon. The dress was made from ivory silk, organza and chantilly lace. The silk, satin dress has a "slightly" dropped waist with a cream silk overlay on the skirt. The bodice and skirt are both bordered in lace. The waist is "highlighted" with apricot chiffon, and apricot and pink rosettes. The dress has a high collar that is decorated with rhinestones, which also feature on the organza puffed sleeves. The look is completed by a half-length veil. A writer for the Tasmanian Museum and Art Gallery's website observed that it was "in keeping with Charlene's character as the suburban girl-next-door." While the show's costume designer, Nicholas Wakerley, called it "perfect for the time". Wakerley described the dress as being "young and cool" for the time, just like Charlene. He also revealed that the dress fitted Watson's desire for a fairy-tale wedding. When asked what made the dress memorable, fashion designer Alex Perry, stated: "There are so many things going on that it's hard not to remember it! The see-through sleeves with a hint of lace, the romantic era-style shoulders, the high neckline and hem." Knowing how popular Minogue and Charlene were at the time, Perry was sure that the dress would have been copied by viewers. Charlene's bridesmaids wore peach taffeta dresses, while the groom and his ushers wore charcoal grey tails.

Minogue was asked by the producers to choose a romantic song to be played in the episode and she chose "Suddenly" by Angry Anderson. Anderson had written the song a long time before it was used in Episode 523. He explained that it is about a man coming to a certain point in his life when he realises that he does not mind being vulnerable. Minogue told Anderson that she loved the song and how the lyrics resonated with her. She later revealed that she wanted the song played at her own wedding. After Episode 523 was broadcast in the UK, "Suddenly" reached number 3 on the Singles Chart.

== Promotion and broadcast ==
Network Ten's national publicity director, Brian Walsh, believed the wedding episode would be an ideal marketing opportunity. He arranged for Minogue and Donovan to attend a wedding breakfast at the Park Royal Hotel in Parramatta and invited four hundred competition winners to join them. Minogue and Donovan later made an appearance with the wedding cake at Westfield Parramatta. Walsh recalled: "I'd never seen anything like it; there would have been 6000 people. Security had to prevent any more going inside. It was as simple as Jason and Kylie and a wedding cake on stage. There was a speech and the cutting of the cake. Then there was this near riot. We had to stop the appearance at this point to prevent people getting crushed." The actors made several more appearances with replica cakes in shopping centres throughout Sydney and Melbourne. They would cut the cakes and then hand out slices to thousands of fans. The episode later become the main focus on covers of TV Week and the Australian edition of Time magazine.

Episode 523 was first broadcast in Australia on 1 July 1987. Just over a year later, the episode aired in the United Kingdom on 8 November 1988. In 1989, Scott and Charlene's wedding was included on a VHS titled The Neighbours Wedding Collection. In 2002, Fremantle included the episode on the Neighbours: Defining Moments DVD box set. The episode was also featured on the Neighbours: The Iconic Episodes Volume 2 DVD box set released in 2009.

== Reception ==
=== Ratings ===
Episode 523 was seen by two million viewers upon its broadcast in Australia, making it one of the highest rating soap opera episodes. When it aired in the United Kingdom, the episode attracted an audience of 19.6 million, making it the third most watched programme in the country that year.

=== Critical response ===
Kelly Bourne from TV Week described the episode as "the television wedding of the year" and "a fairytale ceremony". Bourne observed that the wedding would be the most exciting soap opera event of 1987. The head of drama at Network Ten, Rick Maier, stated: "Scott and Charlene's wedding was the biggest television event of 1987. ... Not only a major turning point for Neighbours, but a wedding that stopped a nation." The Sydney Morning Herald's Michael Idato observed that "Australians packed the aisles for the nuptials of star-crossed teenagers Scott and Charlene" and added that "the nation wept" while "Suddenly" played. Sarah Megginson from SheKnows quipped: "Scott and Charlene's wedding episode is practically the defining episode of what Neighbours was all about in the 80s. This episode featured the entire cast, and audiences loved watching the romance of off-screen couple Jason Donovan [Scott] and Kylie Minogue [Charlene] spill over on to the small screen." Andrew Mercado, author of Super Aussie Soaps, called the episode "The biggest event ever in Aussie soap history".

Elizabeth Day, writing for The Guardian, commented: "For many, the quintessential on-screen wedding remains the 1987 marriage of Scott and Charlene in Australian daytime soap Neighbours. It was the apotheosis of a romantic teenage love story which brought together two feuding families – the Robinsons and the Ramsays – in much the same way as the Montagues and the Capulets, albeit with fewer deaths and more shoulder pads." The Birmingham Post's Gemma Quade named the wedding one of her five most memorable Neighbours storylines, calling it a "tearjerker episode". Josephine Monroe, author of The Neighbours Programme Guide, wrote that the episode showed the "soap wedding of the century!", adding: "Teenagers Scott and Charlene tied the knot in a traditional and emotional church service". During a feature on how to celebrate a wedding ceremony in the style of a soap opera, Tom Cole from the Radio Times said: "Who needs Mendelssohn and Bach when you can process down the aisle to power ballad 'Suddenly' by Australian rocker Angry Anderson? Sounds unorthodox, but it put pep in the step of Scott and Charlene in Neighbours. Note to groom: we can't all swan around like we're Jason Donovan, so give the feathered mullet a miss."

=== Impact and legacy ===
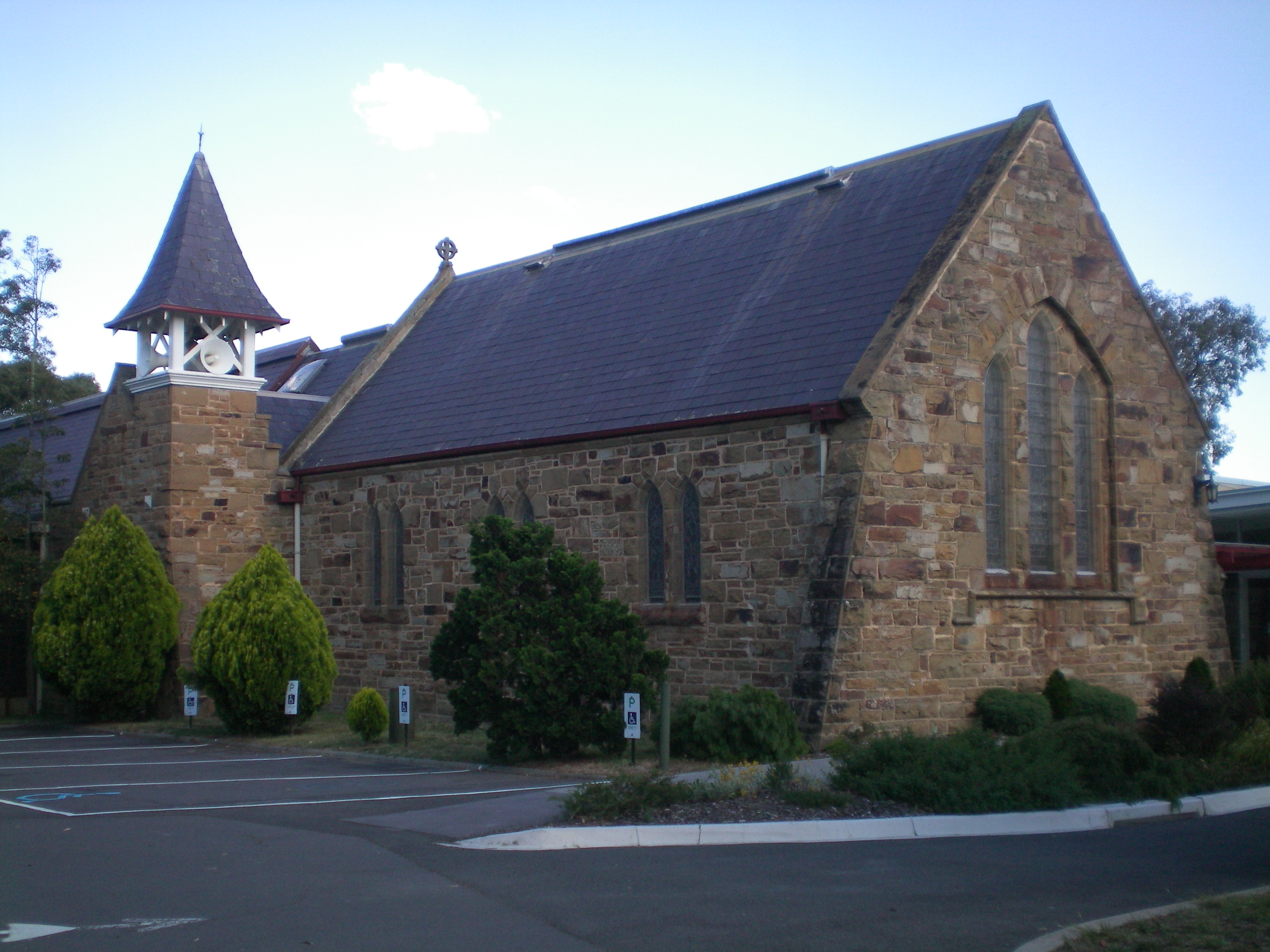
The Holy Trinity Church experienced a surge of interest from fans of the show after the episode aired.

The Holy Trinity Church experienced an increase in interest after the episode aired, with some viewers holding their own weddings there. Backpackers also visit the church during their holidays to see the nave where Scott and Charlene were married. The church has since been used again by Neighbours to film the weddings of Harold and Madge, Libby Kennedy (Kym Valentine) and Drew Kirk (Dan Paris), and Vanessa Villante (Alin Sumarwata) and Lucas Fitzgerald (Scott Major). Charlene's wedding dress was donated to the Tasmanian Museum and Art Gallery by Grundy television in 1989. It has since gone on display in the Powerhouse Museum and travelled to Victoria and the UK. A copy of the episode's script, autographed by Harding, fetched £2,000 when it came up for auction in London.

In October 1997, the serial's longest serving character, Helen Daniels (Anne Haddy), was seen watching a video of Scott and Charlene's wedding before she died. Kathleen Morgan from the Daily Record commented: "The wedding video brought back memories of the soap's golden years." Footage of the wedding was later shown during the soap's 20th anniversary episode, "Friends for Twenty Years". Charlene became an iconic bridal image, and when Jane Turner and Gina Riley were writing the 2004 season finale of Kath & Kim, they asked Minogue to play the character of Epponnee Rae who was due to get married. Executive producer Rick McKenna thought that it would be funny for Minogue to dress up as Charlene and the singer agreed. She appeared as a futuristic version of the character, complete with a lacy dress and 80s style hair.

In October 2006, Australia Post brought out five stamps celebrating fifty years of television. Network Ten's stamp featured Charlene and Scott in their wedding attire. In 2007, Herald Sun readers voted Scott and Charlene's wedding as their top Neighbours moment. A Herald Sun reporter said: "No other wedding in soap history in Australia has captured the attention like Scott and Charlene's nuptials late in 1987." The episode became FremantleMedia's seventh most requested television clip in 2008. To celebrate the soap's 25th anniversary and its 6000th episode, producers decided to "recreate the magic" of Scott and Charlene's wedding through the marriage of Ringo Brown (Sam Clark) and Donna Freedman (Margot Robbie). Robbie said: "People are saying that my wedding is this generation's Kylie (Minogue) and Jason (Donovan) wedding – that's big shoes to fill."

Scott and Charlene's wedding ceremony has often been included in lists about the best television weddings or soap opera moments. It was voted the "Most Romantic TV Nuptials of all Time" and the "Top TV Wedding of all Time" in a Radio Times poll. The following year saw the wedding place ninth in a list of the most memorable soap moments. In 2011, the wedding placed third in Channel 5's Greatest TV Weddings programme. It also came third in Virgin Media's "10 Best On-screen Nuptials" list. Sky Living included the ceremony in their 2012 feature on the best TV weddings, with a reporter noting that it is probably Neighbours' most iconic moment. After including the ceremony in their list of best TV weddings, a writer for MSN New Zealand stated that "it set the standard up to which TV weddings (and terrible mullets) are held." In 2019, a writer from Soap World included Scott and Charlene's ceremony in their feature profiling soap weddings. They wrote: "aww... doesn't it just make you wanna start singing along to 'Suddenly'? This was a Ramsay Street classic – and we hear they're still together! Bless!" In 2015, a Herald Sun reporter included Scott and Charlene's wedding in their "Neighbours' 30 most memorable moments" feature.
