= Paul Wiltshire =

Australian record producer

Paul Lancaster Wiltshire
- Born: Paul Lancaster Wiltshire; 25 July 1970 (age 55)
- Genres: Pop, rock, dance-pop, pop rock
- Occupations: songwriter producer
- Years active: 1996–present

Paul Lancaster Wiltshire (born 25 July 1970) is an Australian entrepreneur, record producer and songwriter.

== Early life ==
Wiltshire grew up in Ballarat in Western Victoria.

Wiltshire performed in several cover bands in the Ballarat region before moving to Melbourne in 1991 to pursue a career as an instrumentalist, songwriter and record producer.

== Career ==
During 2001 Wiltshire worked with the Los Angeles producing team, The Matrix, responsible for writing songs for Avril Lavigne, Korn, Hilary Duff. He was then represented by producer manager Sandy Roberton (World's End) until 2007.

Wiltshire eventually set up studios in Los Angeles, United States in 2003 with partner Victoria Wu (now Victoria Wiltshire) producing and writing music for artists in both the United States and Australia.

In 2004, Wiltshire signed publishing deals with Orient Pacific Music and Mushroom Music.

Between 2000 and 2009, Wiltshire produced and wrote music, which included 12 #1 chart topping albums/singles, and 28 top 20 albums/singles.

Wiltshire founded the music licensing platform Songtradr in 2014 where he is currently Chief Executive Officer.

== Songwriting & Production- Discography Highlights ==
=== Singles ===
- 2012 'Intervention' - Yianna - (Producer/Mixer)
- 2010 'Devastated' - Sam Clark - (Writer/Producer/Mixer)
- 2010 'Send Me A Sign' - Sam Clark - (Writer/Producer/Mixer)
- 2009 'Broken' - Sam Clark - (Writer/Producer/Mixer) #39 AUS
- 2007 'Addicted To You' - Anthony Callea (Writer/Producer) #19 AUS
- 2006 'Don't Give Up' - Natalie Bassingthwaighte/Shannon Noll (Mixer) #2 AUS - Platinum Sales Award
- 2006 'Stomp!' - Marcia Hines (Producer/Mixer) #43 AUS
- 2005 'Crash' - Chloe (Producer/Mixer) #10 AUS
- 2005 'The Glamorous Life' - Melissa Tkautz (Producer/Mixer) #31 AUS
- 2005 'All I Want' - Melissa Tkautz (Writer/Producer/Mixer) #72 AUS
- 2004 'Bring Me Down' - Brock Downey (Producer/Mixer) #91 AUS
- 2003 'Angel Eyes' - Paulini (Co-Producer/Mixer) #1 AUS - Platinum Sales Award
- 2003 'Learn To Fly' - Shannon Noll (Producer/Mixer) #1 AUS - Gold Sales Award
- 2001 'Everytime I Close My Eyes' - Vanessa Amorosi (Writer) #8 AUS, #11 (Austria)
- 2001 'Whatever' - Tali (Writer/Producer) #32 AUS

=== Albums ===
- 2011 'The 2 Of Us' - Alfredo Malabello - (Producer/Mixer)
- 2010 'Released' - Engelbert Humperdinck - (Producer/Mixer)
- 2010 'Take Me Home' - Sam Clark - (Writer/Producer/Mixer)
- 2010 'Goodbyemotel' - Goodbyemotel - (Producer/Mixer)
- 2009 'The Motor City Collection' - Human Nature - (Producer) #18 AUS - Platinum Sales Award
- 2008 'Battle Of The Choirs' - Channel 7 (Producer)
- 2008 'No Turning Back: The Story So Far' - Shannon Noll (Producer, Writer) #7 AUS**
- 2008 'Life' - Marcia Hines (Writer, Producer, Mixer) #21 AUS
- 2007 'Get Ready' - Human Nature (Producer) #2 AUS - Multi-Platinum Sales Award
- 2007 'Rush' - Dean Geyer (Producer, Mixer) #7 AUS**
- 2007 'A New Chapter' - Anthony Callea (Writer, Producer, Mixer) #9 AUS - Gold Sales Award**
- 2007 'Closer To The Sun' - Guy Sebastian (Producer, Mixer) #4 AUS - Platinum Sales Award**
- 2006 'Songs Of Hope & Journey' - (Mixer) #40 AUS**
- 2006 'Dancing in the Street: the Songs of Motown II' - Human Nature (Producer) #1 AUS - Multi Platinum Sales Award
- 2006 'Discotheque' - Marcia Hines (Producer/Mixer) #6 AUS - Gold Sales Award
- 2006 'Lift' - Shannon Noll (Writer, Producer) #1 AUS - Multi Platinum Sales Award**
- 2005 'Never Gone' - The Backstreet Boys (Writer/Producer) #3 (US), #11 (UK), #1 (Canada), #6 (AUS), #3 (JAPAN) - Multi Platinum Sales Awards & Gold Awards**
- 2005 'What's Wrong With This Picture' - Lee Harding (Producer/Mixer) #3 AUS - Gold Sales Award**
- 2005 'A Place I've Never Been' - Kate DeAraugo (Producer/Mixer) #10 AUS - Platinum Sales Award**
- 2005 'Reach Out: The Motown Record' - Human Nature (Producer/Mixer) #1 AUS - Multi Platinum Sales Award
- 2005 'The Final 13' - Australian Idol (Producer/Mixer) #30 AUS**
- 2005 'Lost & Found' - Melissa Tkautz (Writer/Producer/Mixer)
- 2004 'Up All Night' - Rob Mills (Writer/Producer/Mixer) #21 AUS**
- 2004 'For You' - Casey Donavan (Producer/Mixer) #1 AUS - Multi Platinum Sales Award**
- 2004 'Amazing Grace: Songs for Christmas' - Paulini (Producer/Mixer) #2 AUS**
- 2004 'Mercury 4' - Mercury 4 (Writer/Producer/Mixer) #32 AUS**
- 2004 'Anthony Callea' - Anthony Callea (Producer/Mixer) #1 AUS**
- 2003 'Whatever Will Be' - Tammin Sursok (Producer/Mixer) #13 AUS - Gold Sales Award**
- 2003 'One Determined Heart' - Paulini (Co-Producer/Mixer) #1 AUS - Multi Platinum Sales Award**
- 2003 'That's What I'm Talking About' - Shannon Noll (Producer/Mixer) #1 AUS - Multi Platinum Sales Award**
- 2003 'Walk The Tightrope' - Human Nature (Producer/Mixer) #12 AUS - Gold Sales Award**
- 2002 'Signal Hill' - Monique Brumby - (Mixer)
- 2002 'Turn to Me' - Vanessa Amorosi (Writer) #21 AUS**
- 2001 'Diva' - Marcia Hines (Writer) - #63 AUS**
- 2001 'Innocent Eyes' - Delta Goodrem (Writer) - #1 AUS - Multi Platinum Sales Award**
- 2001 'Now Listen' - Ross Wilson (Producer/Mixer)**
- 2000 'The Power' - Vanessa Amorosi (Writer/Producer/Mixer) - #1 AUS - Multi Platinum Sales Award**
- 2000 'Follow Your Heart' - Nikki Webster (Writer) #5 AUS - Platinum Sales Award**

**Denotes Albums that also contain tracks written/produced/mixed by other parties
