= Devastated (Sam Clark song) =

Single by Sam Clark

from the album Take Me Home
- Released: 30 July 2010 (physical); 1 August 2010 (digital)
- Genre: Pop rock
- Length: 3:31
- Label: PLW Entertainment
- Songwriter: CLARK S/WILTSHIRE P

Sam Clark singles chronology
"Send Me a Sign" (2010)	"Devastated" (2010)

"Devastated" is the third single from Australian singer Sam Clark's debut studio album, Take Me Home. The single is also Clark's debut single in the UK. It was released physically in Australia on 30 July 2010 and digitally on 1 August.

== Music video ==
Released on 3 August, the video for the song was directed by Joel Kohn. The video shows Clark playing the part of four members of a news team – a serious anchor, a campy reporter in the field, a sports reporter and a female weather presenter named Macey Downpour. The video was also one of the ten most viewed Australian videos on YouTube as of the week commencing 15 August 2010.

== Charts ==
On 22 August 2010, "Devastated" debuted at number one on the Australian Physical Singles Chart. On 23 August, it debuted on the AIR Singles Chart (Australian independent chart) at number sixteen.

Chart (2010)	Peak position
Australian Physical Singles Chart	1
AIR Singles Chart	16

== Track listing ==
CD single
No.	Title	Length
1.	"Devastated (radio edit)"
2.	"Devastated (acoustic)"
3.	"Broken (video clip)"	4:20
4.	"Send Me a Sign (video clip)"	3:10
5.	"Send Me a Sign (behind the scenes)"

Digital
No.	Title	Length
1.	"Devastated"	3:31

== Release history ==
Country	Date	Format
Australia	1 August 2010	Digital download
Australia	30 July 2010	CD single
