= Charlene Robinson =

Fictional character from the soap opera Neighbours

- Neighbours character
- Portrayed by: Kylie Minogue
- Duration: 1986–1988, 2022
- First appearance: 17 April 1986
- Last appearance: 28 July 2022
- Introduced by: Reg Watson (1986); Jason Herbison (2022)
In-universe information
- Occupation: Student; Mechanic
- Family: Ramsay; Robinson
- Father: Fred Mitchell
- Mother: Madge Bishop
- Stepfather: Harold Bishop
- Brothers: Henry Ramsay
- Half-brothers: Sam Cole
- Husband: Scott Robinson (1987–present)
- Sons: Daniel Robinson
- Daughters: Madison Robinson
- Grandfathers: Dan Ramsay
- Grandmothers: Edna Ramsay
- Uncles: Max Ramsay; Tom Ramsay
- First cousins: Shane Ramsay; Danny Ramsay

Charlene Robinson (also Mitchell) is a fictional character from the Australian soap opera Neighbours played by Kylie Minogue. Charlene was introduced to the show along with several new characters, as part of a revamp by Network Ten to increase ratings. Minogue auditioned for the role in 1985, shortly after finishing her high school exams. She attended the audition dressed as the character and casting director Jan Russ cast her in the role. Minogue was initially contracted for a week, but this was later extended through to mid-1988. She made her first screen appearance during the episode broadcast on 17 April 1986.

Charlene was portrayed as a feisty, quick-tempered and outspoken tomboy. She had a difficult relationship with her mother and did not like being patronised. Minogue thought viewers liked the character as she was an average Australian teenager. Reinforcing her tomboyish image, Charlene trained as a mechanic and she often wore khaki overalls and baggy sweatshirts. Her relationship with Scott Robinson (Jason Donovan) was central to many of her storylines. They became a popular couple with viewers and the relationship helped boost ratings for Neighbours. Despite breaking up several times during their first 12 months together, the couple stayed together and their relationship eventually culminated in a wedding during "Episode 523", which was first broadcast on 1 July 1987.

During her time as Charlene, Minogue also started singing and released two successful pop singles during 1987 followed by her debut album the following year. In mid-1988, Minogue decided to leave Neighbours to concentrate on her music career. She filmed her final scenes in June 1988 and Charlene made her final screen appearance on 26 July. Minogue won four Logie Awards for her portrayal of Charlene, including the Gold Logie, becoming the youngest person to do so. Critical reaction to the character has been positive. Soap Opera author Dorothy Hobson said Charlene broke stereotypes when it came to careers for women in the 1980s. In 2022, Minogue agreed to return to the role, alongside Donovan, for what was believed to be the soap's final episode.

== Creation and casting ==
After the Seven Network dropped Neighbours in 1985, rival channel Network Ten picked up the series. It initially attracted low ratings and Ten began working hard to publicise the series. They revamped the show and added several new cast members. Kylie Minogue had had a fairly successful career as a child actress, having appeared in various television dramas, including Skyways and The Henderson Kids, but she was considering giving up acting after failing to find further work. After finishing her school exams in 1985, Minogue then auditioned for the role of Charlene. She attended the audition dressed as the character and won the role. Of hiring Minogue, Neighbours casting director Jan Russ commented Minogue "had done a couple of things before I saw her, but she was only 18 and as shy as a mouse. She really hadn't evolved into anything at that stage, but the camera loved her and I knew I had my Charlene." Minogue initially signed up to play Charlene for one week, this was then extended to 13 weeks and then through to mid-1988. She made her debut screen appearance in the episode broadcast on 17 April 1986.

== Development ==
=== Backstory and characterisation ===
In her fictional backstory, Charlene was born in Coffs Harbour on 21 October 1969. She is the youngest child of Fred (Nick Waters) and Madge Mitchell (Anne Charleston), and sister of Henry (Craig McLachlan). When she was a teenager, Charlene drank alcohol, fell pregnant with her first boyfriend and had an abortion. In their 1989 book The Neighbours Factfile', Neil Wallis and Dave Hogan described Charlene's life as "one long series of scrapes and scraps". After her parents divorced, Charlene remained living with her father, but when he felt he was incapable of looking after her, Charlene followed her mother to Erinsborough. Hilary Kingsley, author of Soap Box, observed that Charlene left behind her "life as Lolita" upon moving to the suburb.

Charlene was a self-described tomboy, who preferred to be known by her nickname "Lenny". She was known for her quick temper and her "heart of gold". She always stuck up for those who were considered the underdog. In her book Neighbours: The First 10 Years, Josephine Monroe wrote that Charlene did not like to be patronised and had a sharp tongue. Monroe observed that Charlene's feisty side helped endear her to viewers. In keeping with her tomboyish nature, Charlene trained as a mechanic after leaving school and got an apprenticeship with Rob Lewis (Ernie Bourne). The character's style often consisted of khaki overalls, baggy sweatshirts and her hair set in a perm.

Minogue thought people liked Charlene because she was portrayed as an average Australian teenager, experiencing a difficult relationship with her mother. She continued, "She is a bit of a rebel and they probably relate to that, and while she has her problems she will always come out on top." Minogue shared some similarities with her character, but thought Charlene was far more outspoken and tomboyish than she was. Minogue liked that Charlene often said what she thought, but joked that if she were in trouble and tried to punch someone as Charlene did, she would probably get "flattened". Minogue also said Charlene was sensitive, but she was unlikely to show it and would "rather die than be caught crying."

=== Relationship with Scott Robinson ===
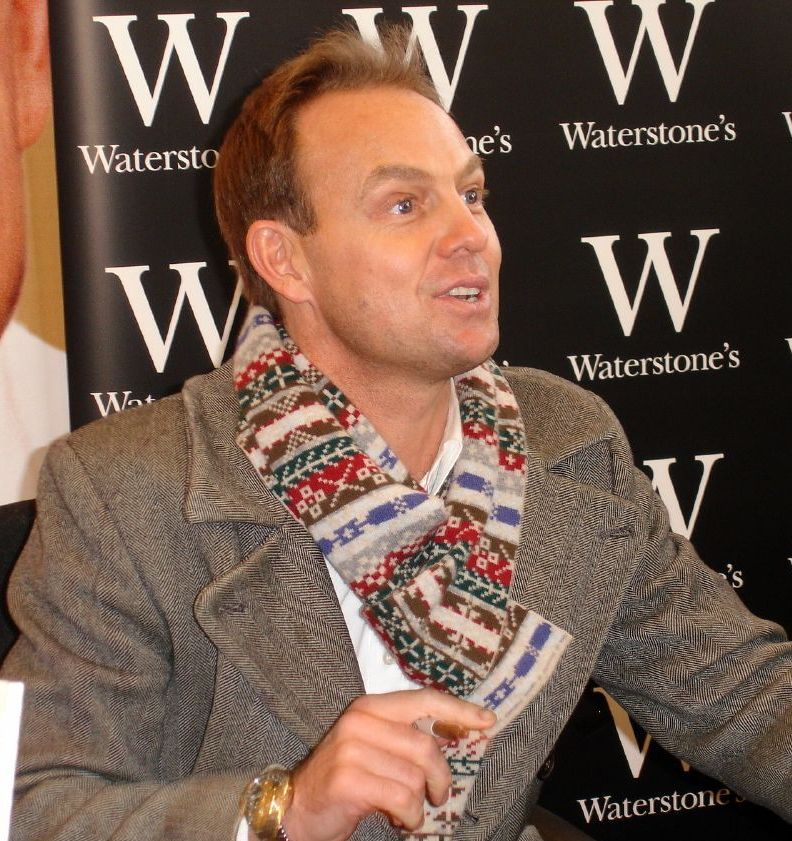
A long-running story arc between Charlene and Scott Robinson (portrayed by Jason Donovan [pictured]) eventually culminated in their marriage.

Charlene's first scenes were with Scott Robinson (played by Jason Donovan). He thought she was trying to break into the Ramsay house and confronted her, which resulted in Charlene punching him. Minogue ended up punching Donovan for real during the take. Producers soon created a story arc for the characters that saw them enter into a romantic relationship. Scott and Charlene's relationship helped boost ratings for Neighbours and the show's publicist, Brian Walsh, capitalised on Minogue and Donovan's increasing popularity with viewers and rumoured off-screen romance. Of Scott and Charlene, Minogue commented "People like Scott and Charlene being a couple. It's probably the most normal relationship in the show." Kelly Bourne from TV Week observed that Scott and Charlene struck a chord with fans, who could identify with them.

Scott and Charlene had problems during their first 12 months together and they broke up several times. One such break-up occurred after Charlene's mother thought she should date other boys, while Scott had to repeat his final year of school without her. Scott was initially unsure how to win Charlene back, but after speaking with his grandmother, Helen (Anne Haddy), who mentioned that her husband gave her a friendship ring, Scott went out and bought one for Charlene. While they were enjoying a barbecue at Charlene's caravan by Lassiter's lake, the couple argued about Charlene spending time with Warren Murphy (Ben Mendelsohn) and Scott decided to leave. When Charlene started to go after Scott, she found herself trapped by a fire that had been accidentally started by Greg Davis (Alex Papps). Greg had been storing petrol under the caravan and spilled it as he was removing the cans, causing the petrol to head towards the still burning barbecue. Scott rescued "a terrified" Charlene from the flames, but an explosion threw them both to the ground and Charlene was knocked unconscious.

Donovan commented that Scott loved Charlene, so when he saw she was in danger, he forgot to think about himself and he just went in to rescue her. Donovan added that Scott was "devastated" when he saw Charlene had been injured. At the hospital, Scott gave Charlene the friendship ring and declared that they would live together. Minogue told Bourne that Charlene was flattered by the gift, while Donovan stated that it proved that they loved each other and were not going to break up again. Minogue agreed with Donovan, saying "There is that underlying love whether they are together or not." After learning about the couple's plans to move in together, their friends and neighbours expressed their shock at how serious the couple had become. When Charlene showed the ring to Daphne Clarke (Elaine Smith) and told her how she and Scott wanted to live together, Daphne was taken back. Scott's friend Mike Young (Guy Pearce) also voiced his opposition, but Scott was determined that no one would stop them from moving in together. Bourne noted that Daphne's shock at the couple's plans was "the start of a major controversy, splitting apart the inhabitants of Ramsay Street."

When older Neighbours viewers expressed their concern about a young unwed couple moving in together, producers decided to have them marry instead. On-screen, neither family approved of Scott and Charlene's plan to move in together, but when Scott learned his father was only 18 when he got married, Scott found the solution to their problem and asked Charlene to marry him. Minogue said Charlene was shocked at first, but she became "very excited" about the idea of getting married. She continued, "She knows they want to live together and they have had so much trouble getting their parents' approval that I suppose getting married seems the logical thing to do. They will be together anyway, so they may as well finalise it." After getting over her initial shock, Madge gave the couple her blessing to get married. Minogue and Donovan both agreed that they would not get married so young, and Donovan thought that younger couples should live together first. He also believed that Scott was rushing into things. Scott and Charlene were married during "Episode 523", which was first broadcast on 1 July 1987 to two million Australian viewers. The episode became "a TV phenomenon" and Minogue said it was what Scott and Charlene's romance had been building up to.

After returning from their honeymoon, Scott and Charlene moved in with Madge and Henry, and they struggled financially. Just three months after their wedding, producers decided to throw temptation at the couple to keep their relationship interesting. Andrew Mercado, author of Super Aussie Soaps, quipped that "a happy soap couple is considered the kiss of death". Scott was the first to cheat when he kissed Jane Harris (Annie Jones), while she helped him study for his HSC. After Jane confessed to Charlene, she threw Scott out and refused to talk to him. In a bid to reunite the couple, Jane told Charlene that she would steal Scott away from her unless she did something about it. The couple soon reunited. The following year, Charlene had a brief affair with her driving instructor Steve Fisher (Michael Pope).

=== Other storylines ===
One evening in July 1986, Charlene came home with a newborn baby and shocked her mother by claiming that he was her son. Charlene told Madge a story, so convincing that Madge believed she had become a grandmother. However, Charlene soon revealed that the baby was actually her half-brother Sam Cole (Thomas Hamston; Scott Wealands). She explained to Madge that she had been helping to care for him, after his mother Susan (Gloria Ajenstat), turned to Charlene for help. Susan had had an affair with Charlene's father Fred, until he threw her out. Charlene knew Madge would not be happy looking after another woman's child, so she claimed he was her son. Soap Box author Hilary Kinglesy noted the situation helped expose Charlene's "soft heart" and her sensitive side.

In the same year, Charlene acted as a backing singer for Scott and Mike Young's band. Scott and Mike entered a demo tape into a song competition, and the judges, Molly Meldrum and Brian Hanson (Jon Finlayson), sought out Charlene as they were impressed with her vocal ability. Molly and Brian invited Charlene to their music studio to record some tracks, but she soon realises that she is not interested in singing and wants to complete her HSC instead. Scott also apologised to Charlene for being jealous of her talent.

=== Departure ===
"I'd been with Charlene long enough. I'd go nuts if I was doing Neighbours all the time."

— Minogue speaking about her departure from Neighbours. (1989)

Minogue ventured into music during her time on the show and her cover of "The Loco-Motion" spent several weeks at the top of the Australian music chart. In late 1987, Minogue flew to England to record "I Should Be So Lucky", before returning home to continue with Neighbours. The press speculated that she would soon have to decide between acting and singing. Shortly after, Minogue chose to concentrate on her burgeoning music career and decided to leave Neighbours after two and a half years. She filmed her final scenes in June 1988. Charlene's exit storyline saw her move to Brisbane, after her grandfather, Dan Ramsay (Syd Conabere), bought her and Scott a house there. Scott was initially unable to go with his wife, so she said goodbye to him, on the understanding that he would join her as soon as he could get a job transfer. All of the cast gathered in the street, while Charlene said goodbye to her brother, mother and friends. She then got into her green Mini and drove out of Ramsay Street.

In November 2004, Minogue was invited to film a cameo appearance for the show's 20th anniversary the following year. A report then emerged that Minogue was willing to film an appearance as Charlene while she was on tour in the UK, but the producers had refused the offer. However, in a statement from production company Grundy Television, the producers said that they "made every effort to accommodate Minogue", including filming the cameo anywhere in the world, but that their offer was turned down. In May 2010, Minogue pondered a return to Neighbours during an interview published in The Sun. Minogue commented on how fun it would be to appear as Charlene again, after years of saying no, and added "I've decided how it would work. Charlene would screech up the drive in her souped-up Mini which she's been working on all the time".

In 2014, Scott and Charlene's son, Daniel Robinson (Tim Phillipps), was introduced to Neighbours. While Phillipps has yet to have any contact with Minogue, Daniel has been seen making several phone calls to Charlene on-screen. Phillipps also said Scott and Charlene were still together and had become "really loving, supportive parents" to Daniel and his sister, Madison (Sarah Ellen), who was introduced in 2016. In August 2014, a Network Ten spokeswoman told the Australian Associated Press that Minogue had been invited to return to Neighbours for the show's 30th anniversary celebrations in 2015, but she chose not to return. However, Minogue agreed to take part in the documentary special Neighbours 30th: The Stars Reunite, which aired in Australia and the UK in March 2015.

=== Return ===
Minogue as Charlene during her return appearance.

In March 2022, Fiona Byrne of the Herald Sun reported on 1 May that both Minogue and Donovan were set to reprise their roles. Byrne believed Minogue and Donovan had filmed a guest appearance on Pin Oak Court, the outdoor location for Ramsay Street, during the previous week. Later on the same day, the return of Minogue and Donovan was confirmed on Neighbours' social media accounts. Executive producer Jason Herbison stated: "Scott and Charlene are the ultimate Neighbours couple and it would not feel right to end the show without them. We are thrilled that Jason and Kylie have come home to play a very special part in our series finale. It has been an emotional experience for them, for us and I'm sure it will be for our viewers." Minogue later told Jenny Paul of Glamour that her return was a thank you to the fans who watched and remembered the early days of Neighbours. Minogue also said the experience led her to think about her past on the serial. She said: "I was just out of school and had just auditioned for Neighbours. I got the job and I was happy to have a job as I'd actually signed up to the dole just a couple of weeks before, but because I got the job I never got dole check! I needed to make a living, I needed to do something. It was meant to be a stint on the show of between one and twelve weeks, I think, so if it didn't work I would have been out after a week or two. Two and a half years later I was still there and the mania had ensued." During an appearance on Late Night with Seth Meyers, Minogue admitted that she felt "quite a bit of pressure" to return. They appeared in what was believed (at the time) to be the show's final ever episode. Subsequently, Amazon picked up the series for their Freevee streaming service, and started filming the revived series in April 2023.

== Reception ==
=== Accolades ===
For her portrayal of Charlene, Minogue won the Logie Award for Most Popular Actress at the 1987 ceremony. She was also nominated for Most Popular New Talent, but lost to her co-star Donovan. The following year, Minogue became the youngest person, at nineteen, to be awarded the Gold Logie Award for Most Popular Personality on Australian Television. She also won the Most Popular Personality on Victorian Television and Most Popular Actress Logie awards. At the Logie Awards of 1989, Minogue earned another nomination for Most Popular Actress and the Gold Logie Award for Most Popular Personality on Australian Television.

=== Critical reception ===
Reception for the character has been positive. The BBC's official Neighbours website stated that Charlene's most memorable moments were "her wedding to Scott and punching Scott in the face during their first meeting." The Independent said Minogue's "elfin prettiness" won Charlene a huge following in Australia and Britain. During a TV Week feature on Minogue, a columnist said she "brought to life one of the most loved and memorable characters of Australian TV." Colleen Last from MSN TV branded Charlene "iconic" and "beloved". During a column on the "Top five ex-Neighbours stars", The Daily Telegraph's Robin Wilks placed Minogue at number one, commenting that "Kylie was once best-known as the sharp-tongued, permanently overalled tomboy Charlene". The Age's Jo Roberts said that the "slightly goofy" Charlene was a "tousle-headed teenager with an oil rag and hoop earrings".

In Tony Johnston's 2005 book, Neighbours: 20 Years of Ramsay Street, Charlene placed sixth in the twenty classic characters chapter. Johnston said Charlene and her mother represented "the old and the new", that her career choice was unusual and her "razor-sharp tongue" put the fear into all the men who lusted after her. Johnston added that the younger female viewers admired Charlene, while the boys loved her feisty nature. In her book Soap Opera, Dorothy Hobson believed Charlene broke stereotypes, especially when it came to careers for women in the 1980s. She wrote, "The sight of one of the most attractive female characters, dressed in overalls, with her cascading blonde curls tied up on top of her head, was one of the most positive images for breaking the stereotypes of what jobs are suitable for girls." Hobson also praised Charlene's on-screen relationship with Scott branding the positive images for young people as "immense". The BBC News noted that Charlene became one of Neighbours' most popular characters.

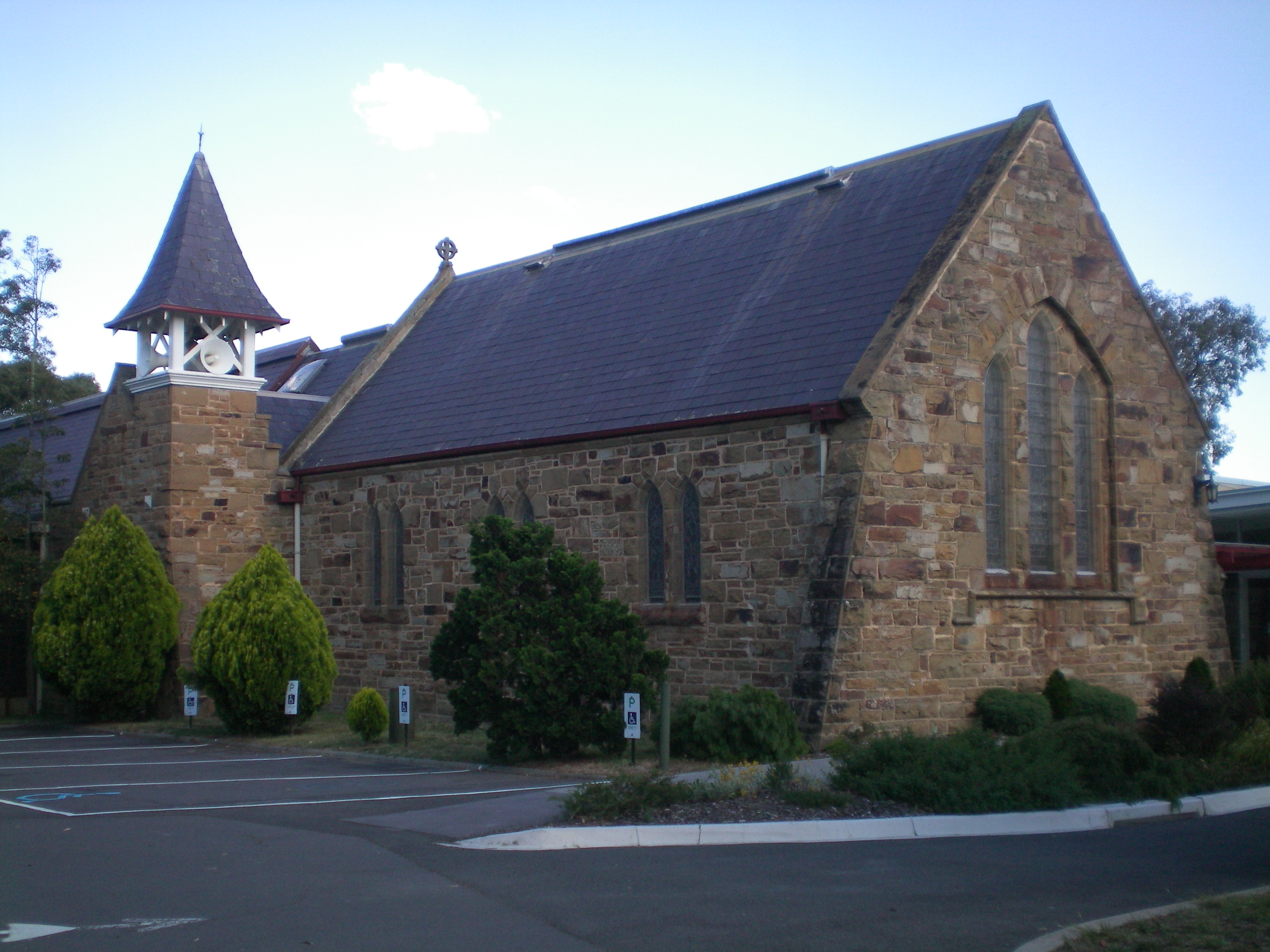
The Holy Trinity Church in Doncaster became a tourist attraction after it was the scene for Scott and Charlene's wedding.

Hilary Kingsley, author of Soap Box, dubbed Charlene "soap's teen queen" and the "darling of the show". Kingsley also said the character was an inspiration to girls all over the country with mother problems, calling Charlene and Madge "a marvellous double act". Sky included Charlene in their feature on the twenty-five most memorable Neighbours characters. They stated,

Charlene was only in the show for two years, but she remains one of the iconic characters because (a) she's Kylie Blooming Minogue, and (b) she married Jason 'Scott Robinson' Donovan. Charlene's name has become the by-word for girl-next-door characters in Soapland, thanks to her tireless efforts to promote the cause of denim dungarees while working as a mechanic, and as a crucial member of the most successful set of teens that Ramsay Street has seen.

In October 2006, Minogue and Donovan, as Charlene and Scott, were included on a postage stamp issued by the Australia Post to celebrate 50 years of television. The Holy Trinity Church experienced an increase in interest after Scott and Charlene's wedding aired. Backpackers visit the nave where the couple were wed, while some viewers have held their own weddings there. Charlene's wedding dress was donated to the Tasmanian Museum and Art Gallery by Grundy Television in 1989. It has since gone on display in the Powerhouse Museum and travelled to the UK. In 2013, The Daily Telegraph included Scott and Charlene in their list of the "20 best TV couples". They called them "a supercouple" and "a bit of a Romeo and Juliet" pairing. Donna Hay from What's on TV included Charlene and Scott in their "marriages made in heaven" feature and branded them "Ramsay Street's answer to Antony and Cleopatra". Hay noted that they had a "stormy courtship" and "more rows than the Tories, but they proved their parents wrong" and married.

Upon the news of the serial's cancellation, Sheena McGinley of the Irish Independent ranked Charlene as the fifth best character in Neighbours history. McGinley explained her choice by saying, "I know we were not going to mention the very famous sorts who managed to utilise Neighbours as a springboard to global fame, but this is the OG. Speaking as someone who’s had the pleasure of meeting Kylie Minogue while working at the front desk in a recording studio, I can personally attest to that part of Charlene that will always be a key element of Kylie — her magnificent, tightly curled locks."

== See also ==
- Scott Robinson and Charlene Mitchell
