= Tim Phillipps =

Australian actor

- Born: Adelaide, South Australia, Australia
- Occupation: Actor
- Years active: 2006-present
- Spouse: Jessica Lee Rose (m. 2017)
- Children: 1

Tim Phillipps is an Australian actor perhaps best known for his roles in the soap opera Neighbours, drama series Bed of Roses and the movie Animal Kingdom. He has also appeared in the American television series Once Upon a Time and The Secret Circle. He provided the voice and motion capture for Dante in the video game DmC: Devil May Cry.

== Early and personal life ==
Phillipps was born in Adelaide, South Australia. He has a brother Josh, who is a television presenter, and a sister Libby. Phillipps attended St Peter's College.

Phillipps became engaged to actress Jessica Lee Rose in March 2016. They married at the Royal Melbourne Yacht Squadron in early 2017. Phillipps announced on 8 July 2019 that he and Rose were expecting their first child. Their son was born in September 2019.

== Career ==
In 2006, Australian teen magazine, Dolly, held a competition offering two readers a chance to win a three-month contract with the soap opera Neighbours. Phillipps auditioned, along with his best friend, Sam Clark, who eventually won the role of Ringo Brown. Phillipps was later cast in the recurring role of Fox, a figment of established character Paul Robinson's (Stefan Dennis) imagination. Phillipps went on to appear in Bed of Roses, Rush and the Australian feature film Animal Kingdom.

Shortly after moving to Los Angeles, Phillipps landed his first lead role in the US feature film Liars All, playing a soccer player called Billy. Of the role, Phillipps said "This role gives me the opportunity to really break the mould and I will have the chance to be someone really different and push my limits." Phillipps voices the character of Dante in DmC: Devil May Cry.

Phillipps was cast as Prince Thomas in ABC's Once Upon a Time. In January 2012, it was announced Phillipps had joined the cast of The CW drama The Secret Circle in the recurring role of Grant. Phillips made his debut as Grant in the episode "Lucky", which aired on 15 March 2012.

On 20 April 2014, it was confirmed that Phillipps had re-joined the cast of Neighbours in the role of Daniel Robinson, son of iconic couple Scott Robinson and Charlene Mitchell (Jason Donovan and Kylie Minogue). Phillipps hosted a documentary special celebrating the show's 30th anniversary titled Neighbours 30th: The Stars Reunite, which aired in Australia and the UK in March 2015. On 16 April 2016, it was announced Phillipps would leave Neighbours, along with Ariel Kaplan on 26 April. Phillipps revealed that it was not his decision to leave the show, and that the producers chose to write his character out. Phillipps reprised his role of Prince Thomas during the sixth season of Once Upon a Time.

== Filmography ==
=== Films ===
Year	Title	Role	Notes
2010	Shadow Heart	Calis	Short
2010	Animal Kingdom	Constable Daniel Hordern	
2010	When the Wind Changes	Blandy	Short
2011	Ben Comen	Jim	Short
2011	Mugged	Adam	Short
2013	Liars All	Billy	
2014	Chasing the Devil	Patrick	
2014	Lemon Tree Passage	Geordie	
2018	Knuckles	Matt	Short
2018	Love Lex	David Rose	Short
2018	The Way	Hunter	Short
2021	The Dunes	William Night	

=== Television ===
Year	Title	Role	Notes
2007	Neighbours	Fox	7 episodes
2008	Underbelly	Damien	Episode: "Earning a Crust"
2008–2010	Bed of Roses	Sean Smithwick	14 episodes
2008	Rush	Ben	1 episode
2009	Home and Away	Archie Maddock	2 episodes
2009	Rush	Aden Geddes	1 episode
2012	The Secret Circle	Grant	5 episodes
2011–2012	Chopper	Eric	5 episodes
2011–2016	Once Upon a Time	Prince Thomas/Sean Herman	Episodes: "The Price of Gold", "Skin Deep", "The Other Shoe"
2013	The Cheerleader Diaries	Harrison Simmons	5 episodes
2014–2016, 2023	Neighbours	Daniel Robinson	Regular role
2015	Neighbours 30th: The Stars Reunite	Himself; host	Documentary
2019	Lucy and DiC	Mr. Perfect	8 episodes
2019	Preacher	Golfer	1 episode
2024	Territory	Kirby Business Affairs Manager	4 episodes

=== Video games ===
Year	Title	Role	Notes
2012	PlayStation All-Stars Battle Royale	Dante	Voice and motion capture
2013	DmC: Devil May Cry	Dante	Voice and motion capture
2015	DmC: Devil May Cry: Definitive Edition	Dante	Voice and motion capture
