= Scott Robinson (Neighbours) =

Fictional character from the soap opera Neighbours

- Neighbours character
- Jason Donovan as Scott Robinson (1989)
- Portrayed by: Darius Perkins (1985); Jason Donovan (1986–1989, 2022)
- Duration: 1985–1989, 2022
- First appearance: 18 March 1985
- Last appearance: 28 July 2022
- Created by: Reg Watson
- Introduced by: Reg Watson (1985); Jason Herbison (1989)
- Darius Perkins as Scott Robinson (1985)
In-universe information
- Occupation: Student; Paper boy; Journalist
- Family: Robinson
- Father: Jim Robinson
- Mother: Anne Robinson
- Brothers: Paul Robinson
- Sisters: Lucy Robinson
- Half-brothers: Glen Donnelly
- Half-sisters: Julie Martin; Jill Ramsay
- Wife: Charlene Mitchell (1987–present)
- Sons: Daniel Robinson
- Daughters: Madison Robinson
- Grandfathers: James Robinson; Bill Daniels
- Grandmothers: Bess Robinson; Helen Daniels
- Aunts: Rosemary Daniels
- Other relatives: Laura Dennison; Nikki Dennison

Scott Robinson is a fictional character from the Australian television soap opera Neighbours. He was created by Reg Watson as one of the serial's twelve original characters. Originally played by Darius Perkins, he made his debut during the first episode broadcast on 18 March 1985. Perkins was 20 years old when he received the role of teenager Scott. He felt some anxiety about his audition performance and did not think anything was going to come from it, until the production company contacted him a month later to sign on as Scott. When production moved to Network Ten in 1986, producers wanted "a more upfront" Scott and the role was recast to Jason Donovan, who joined the cast following his graduation from school. He made his debut on 12 February 1986, and producers hoped Donovan's blond hair and blue eyes would increase the character's appeal. Perkins later said that he had been physically and mentally exhausted after filming for nine months, and felt unable to continue in the role of Scott.

At the beginning of Neighbours, Scott is a 16 year old high school student, living at home with his father, grandmother, and three siblings. Scott is shown to be close with his father, whom he respects. He is initially characterised as a normal, happy teenager, with an increasing interest in girls as he becomes an adolescent. His best friend was neighbour Danny Ramsay (David Clencie), a role Donovan originally auditioned for. Scott's early storylines include a romance with fellow student Kim Taylor (Jenny Young) and being accused of robbery. With Donovan in the role, Scott was portrayed as charming, perceptive, neat, and likeable, leading him to become the show's male pin up. Donovan's popularity set a new standard for casting directors, which they felt they had to meet every time they introduced a new "stud" character. Producers soon created a story arc around Scott's relationship with Charlene Mitchell, played by Kylie Minogue.

Scott and Charlene's romance led to increased ratings for Neighbours and the show's publicist capitalised on Minogue and Donovan's popularity with viewers. Scott and Charlene experience a variety of problems during their first 12 months together. When Scott suggests they should move in together, this caused controversy on and off-screen, with some Neighbours viewers expressing their concern about a young unwed couple moving in together. Producers then decided that the couple would marry instead and their wedding was broadcast on 1 July 1987 to two million Australian viewers. To keep the relationship interesting, writers scripted a kiss between Scott and Jane Harris (Annie Jones). On 7 March 1989, it was announced that Donovan had quit Neighbours to pursue a music career, and his exit aired on 18 May 1989. For his portrayal of Scott, Donovan won the Logie Award for Most Popular New Talent (1987) and Most Popular Actor (1988). He was twice nominated for the Gold Logie for Most Popular Personality. In 2022, Donovan agreed to reprise his role, alongside Minogue, for what was believed (at the time) to be the show's final ever episode. Subsequently, Amazon announced that they had picked up the series for their Freevee streaming service, and Amazon started filming the revived series in April 2023.

== Creation and casting ==
Scott is one of the twelve original regular characters conceived by the creator and then executive producer of Neighbours, Reg Watson. Darius Perkins was 20 years old when he received the role of teenager Scott. When Perkins learned the telemovie Matthew and Son, in which he starred alongside Paul Cronin, was not going to be picked up to series, he knew he was free to join the cast of Neighbours. He told Patrice Fidgeon of TV Week that he had already heard about Neighbours before any decision had been made about Matthew and Son, but he had not decided on what he wanted to do that year, admitting that he "didn't want to lock myself into a situation I couldn't get out of." Perkins admitted to feeling anxious about his performance following his audition for Scott. He told Fidgeon: "I didn't have the faintest idea about the character I was supposed to be playing." The serial's producers deliberately kept the character outlines vague, except for the character's age, gender, and hair colour. Perkins reckoned this was to prevent character information escaping before they were ready to start filming. It was around a month before Perkins heard back about his audition and he came to believe nothing was going to happen. The Grundy Organisation later got in contact to ask him to sign on to play Scott. Perkins told Fidgeon that he had a six-month contract with a six-month option on their side, but that was as far as he wanted to commit to the show. He stated "I prefer not to be tied at all, but that's the way it goes. They have to have their security." His casting was publicised in the 26 January 1985 issue of TV Week. Perkins made his debut as Scott in the show's pilot episode broadcast on 18 March 1985.

When the production of Neighbours moved to Network Ten for 1986, Perkins did not return to the series and the role of Scott was recast. Various reasons have been given for Perkins' departure, including concerns over Perkins' reliability and that he had multiple rows with producer. Rumours that he had been fired due to a drug problem also emerged, which Perkins denied in an October 1988 interview with TV Week's Leigh Reinhold. He told Reinhold that he had refused to continue with the show when it moved to Network Ten in 1986. Having been working for nine months, Perkins claimed he was both physically and mentally exhausted, and felt unable to continue in the role of Scott. Perkins stated "Drugs had nothing to do with me leaving. It was a personal decision. I was feeling trapped at the time. Towards the end I didn't think I was giving enough of myself. I didn't want to end up not wanting to watch myself on screen." He had also blamed a failed relationship for being unable to handle the pressure, which he said was "a bit of a cop-out." Perkins was shocked by some of the press stories written about a supposed drug dependency, and said that when he attended casting sessions, he thought people were probably wondering whether he was "'out of it' or not."

Jason Donovan, then 17, was given the role following his graduation from school. Donovan was originally asked to audition for the role of Danny Ramsay while Neighbours was in the planning stages, but his father, actor Terence Donovan, advised him against it and told him to finish school first. He initially did not want his son to become an actor as he felt the industry was too "unstable." Donovan admitted that had never watched Neighbours before joining the cast, saying "I'd sort of flicked through it once, but that was all." He made his debut as Scott on 12 February 1986, following a brief absence for the character. Scott soon became the serial's new "pin-up" character and Donovan's image and popularity in the role set a high standard for casting directors, which they felt they had to meet each time they were introducing a "stud" type character. Perkins admitted that he was glad not to be with Neighbours, despite its success at the time, or in Donovan's shoes. He wished Donovan well, but he did not want to be him, adding that he wanted to build his acting career slowly to gain respect.

== Development ==
=== Characterisation and early storylines ===
As the serial begins, Scott is a 16 year old high school student, living at home with his widowed father Jim Robinson (Alan Dale), his grandmother Helen Daniels (Anne Haddy), and three siblings Paul (Stefan Dennis), Julie (Vikki Blanche), and Lucy (Kylie Flinker; Sasha Close). Scott was shown to be close with his father, but had a strained relationship with his older brother Paul. His best friend was neighbour Danny Ramsay (David Clencie). Scott was billed as "a normal, usually happy 16-year-old". An Inside Soap writer called him "a dark-haired, geeky schoolboy". Margaret Koppe of TV Radio Extra said Scott was moving into the adolescent stage and gaining an interest in girls. He eventually fell "hopelessly in love" with Kim Taylor (Jenny Young). In her book, Soap Box, Hilary Kingsley wrote that Scott was not "such a goodie" while played by Perkins. One of the character's early storylines saw him and Danny get into trouble with the police over a suspected robbery, and they flee Erinsborough to work on a farm. They later fight over Wendy Gibson (Kylie Foster). As Neighbours moved to Network Ten, producers wanted "a more upfront" Scott. To facilitate the recast from Perkins to Donovan, Scott goes missing on a school trip and is briefly presumed dead, before he reappears played by Donovan. Producers hoped the actor's blond hair and blue eyes would increase the character's "bankable appeal".

After Donovan took over the role, Kingsley branded Scott "the star schoolboy of Neighbours and described him as "polite, perceptive, neat and nice." She thought it was likely he folded his own clothes too, making him stand out among the teenagers of the time. Although Scott was involved in "the occasional teenage hiccup" he was both "likeable" and "hard working". Donovan shared some similarities to Scott, including being raised by a single parent. Donovan stated "I've done most of the things Scott's done – school exams and things like that – so I don't really have to go too far to understand his character." The actor admitted to not being happy with Scott's attitude, calling him "very moody and a bit hard to play sometimes". He tried to bring as much comedy and lightness to the role that he could, as he believed Neighbours should have light characters and not "always heavy drama." The character soon became the show's male "pin up". Writer Josephine Monroe observed that Donovan turned Scott into "every girl's dream date". He was perceived as being cute, as well as "witty and charming". He continued to be close to his father, whom he respected and looked up to, while he was also protective of younger sister Lucy. After leaving school, the character's ambition was to become a journalist.

=== Relationship with Charlene Mitchell ===
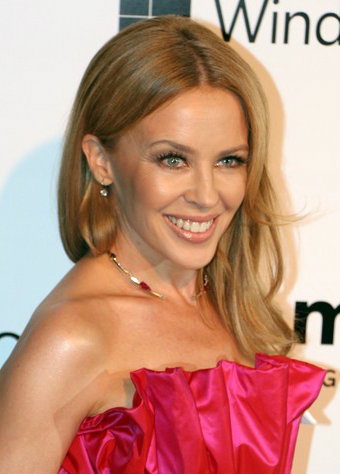
A long-running story arc between Scott and Charlene Mitchell (portrayed by Kylie Minogue [pictured]) eventually culminates in their marriage.

In April 1986, Kylie Minogue joined the cast as Charlene Mitchell, daughter of Scott's neighbour Madge Mitchell (Anne Charleston). Her first scene was with Scott, who thinks she is trying to break into Madge's house. When he goes to stop her, Charlene punches him in the mouth. Minogue ended up punching Donovan for real during filming. The actors had previously worked together in an episode of Skyways when they were younger. Donovan later recalled that he encountered Minogue for the first time on-set in the wardrobe bus. She reminded him of their work on Skyways after he failed to recognise her. He stated that they soon become good friends as their characters became acquainted. Producers soon created a story arc for the characters that saw them enter into a romantic relationship. Scott and Charlene's romance contributed to a boost in ratings for Neighbours and the show's publicist, Brian Walsh, capitalised on Minogue and Donovan's increasing popularity with viewers and rumoured off-screen romance. Donovan felt that his on-screen rapport with Minogue was due to their professionalism. He stated "When you've known someone for a long time and you get on with them well, then it's quite easy to create a professional chemistry. That's what you see between us in Neighbours." Minogue believed the couple's relationship helped the characters to become fan favourites, saying "In the storyline they break up and get back together. People like Scott and Charlene being a couple. It's probably the most normal relationship in the show." Donovan admitted that he would not want to date someone like Charlene, as he thought she was "far too stroppy" for him.

Kelly Bourne from TV Week said Scott and Charlene resonated with the show's fans, as many could identify with them. Viewers saw the couple experience a variety of problems during their first 12 months together and "matters come to a head" after Madge pressures Charlene to date other boys, while Scott has to repeat his final year of school without her. Donovan explained to Bourne that Scott realises he does not want to lose Charlene, and so he seeks advice from his grandmother, who mentions that her husband gave her a friendship ring. Donovan said "Scott thinks about it and decides this would be a good way to show Charlene how he feels." Charlene is "flattered" by the ring, and Donovan said that it finally settles the point that they are not going to break-up again and that they love one another. Minogue agreed, saying "There is that underlying love whether they are together or not." Shortly after Scott presents Charlene with the ring at her new caravan, they start a barbecue dinner to celebrate, however, they soon begin arguing when Scott make it clear he is not happy about Charlene spending time with Warren Murphy (Ben Mendelsohn).

Scott "storms away", but when he hears Charlene calling out to him, he sees that she is trapped by a ring of petrol headed towards the barbecue. Unbeknownst to Charlene, arsonist Greg Davis (Alex Papps) was storing fuel under her caravan and he spilled it as he was removing the cans. Donovan told TV Week's Stephen Cook: "When Scott first sees the petrol and then the flames he just does what his instincts tell him to do. He can see see what's going to happen next and he knows he has got to get Charlene out of there." Donovan continued by saying that Scott does not think about the danger to himself, he just goes through the flames and gets her out. The pair are thrown to the ground after an explosion and Scott holds onto a badly injured Charlene. Donovan told Cook that Scott is not sure whether Charlene is dead or alive. Although he has been burnt himself, he knows something is wrong with her and he is "devastated". Scott realises how deep his love for Charlene is and suggests that the couple move in together. This causes "a major controversy" and divides the Ramsay Street residents.

Daphne Clarke (Elaine Smith) is taken aback by how serious the couple have become, but wishes them well, while Donovan explained that Scott's friend Mike Young (Guy Pearce) is "a lot more moralistic about just what the two are getting themselves into." When some Neighbours viewers expressed their concern about a young unwed couple moving in together, the producers decided to have the couple marry instead. On-screen, neither family approve of Scott and Charlene moving in together, so when Scott learns his father married at 18, he decides that he and Charlene will marry instead. Charlene is surprised by the proposal, but Minogue said she soon becomes "very excited" about the idea of getting married. Jim is against the idea of the couple marrying, believing they are too young (Scott was said to be 18 at the time, and Charlene was 17), while Madge wishes them the best. Donovan told Bourne that in real life he preferred the idea of younger couples living together first, adding that his character was immature and rushing into marriage. Scott and Charlene's wedding was broadcast on 1 July 1987 to two million Australian viewers. After returning from their honeymoon, Scott and Charlene move in with Madge and her brother Henry Ramsay (Craig McLachlan), and they struggle financially.

Just three months after their wedding, producers decided to throw temptation at the couple to keep their relationship interesting. While studying for his HSC, Scott asks Jane Harris (Annie Jones) to help him with his maths. Donovan said Scott is grateful to Jane and the pair become really close friends. During a study session, they go to the lake to work without interruptions and they end up kissing. When Charlene finds out, the repercussions almost end Scott and Charlene's marriage. Donovan admitted to some concerns about the storyline when he learned about it from the producers. He explained to TV Week's Patrice Fidgeon: "I was worried people would think Scott was a heel. But it was really quite innocent. He doesn't know why he kissed Jane – it sort of just happened." Donovan said the kiss between Scott and Jane happens on "the spur of moment" and he does not tell Charlene about it, but when she learns they were at the lake together, she confronts him. Donovan told Fidgeon that Scott "blurts out" that it was just a kiss, as he thinks Charlene is reading too much into it. The resulting argument between the couple ends in Scott walking out and moving back home with the Robinsons, where he goes through "a bout of depression." Jane helps reunite the couple when she tells Charlene that if she does not want Scott, either she or some other girl would have him. This makes Charlene realise what she has in Scott and they reconcile.

Following Charlene's move to Brisbane, where the couple have a new house courtesy of Charlene's grandfather, Scott remains behind for work. In a further bid to test the couple's marriage, producers introduced Sylvie Latham (Christine Harris) and Poppy Skouros (Lenita Vangellis). With Charlene having just left Erinsborough, Scott is feeling lonely without her. He agrees to interview Jane's friend and fellow model Sylvie for the Erinsborough News. Harris said that from the moment Sylvie meets Scott, she wants him and sets out to seduce him. Harris commented "She goes for what she wants at the expense of other people." Harris also branded the plot "Fatal Attraction comes to Neighbours". Harris did not receive any hate mail from fans of Scott and Charlene, and put it down to her empathetic portrayal of Sylvie. Scott's second love interest was fellow news cadet Poppy, who teams up with Scott to write an article about migrants. Vangellis told Coral O'Connor of the Daily Mirror that the pair spend a lot of time together and Poppy falls in love with Scott, but "his is a much slower process." Their closeness does not go unnoticed, and while the residents of Ramsay Street like Poppy, their loyalties are with Scott and Charlene. Vangellis disliked the way Poppy declared her love to Scott, but she did not think she was a femme fatale, but rather "an unfortunate little girl who makes the wrong moves." Fans did not like the storyline and Vangellis revealed that she was once chased onto a tram by a group of school girls calling her a "homewrecker."

=== Departure and return ===
In May 1988, David Brown of TV Week reported Minogue had quit Neighbours in order to pursue a music career and was due to film her final scenes in June. After months of speculation that Donovan would also leave the soap, he signed a new contract and said the show was still important to him. He told Brown: "I'm happy doing the show because I want to keep learning. I've got this real bug about Neighbours at the moment and it's something I just want to keep doing and get better at. I don't think I'd be doing myself justice if I took the big plunge to get out to try and do other things. I'm still learning and there are good storylines coming up that I can tackle." Brown reported that many people believed Donovan would leave the show to work in London because of the success of the show in the UK. Donovan said that he was happy working in Australia and admitted that he had not really thought about leaving the serial at the time. He continued: "There was the speculation, but none of that was happening in my mind. The past couple of years has taken me by surprise, so I had a lot to think about. You don't just rush out and sign a contract. So in those terms, yes I've taken my time. Network Ten and Grundys have been so good to me. They've been helping me and nurturing me, so why should I want to leave?" Donovan also denied that he was "jumping on the Kylie bandwagon" by recording and releasing an album, saying that he always had an interest in music.

On-screen, Charlene moves to Brisbane and Scott promises to follow her, but only if he can secure a journalism job like the one has in Erinsborough. On 7 March 1989, it was announced that Donovan had quit Neighbours to pursue a music career. Coincidentally his record "Too Many Broken Hearts" reached Number One on the UK Singles Chart that same day. Donovan signed a new contract with Network Ten which allowed him to leave the show earlier than his original contract stipulated. Donovan said he was sad to be leaving Neighbours, but he felt it was time to move on. He stated, "They have been great and afforded me many opportunities. My contract allows me to return to Neighbours, so I'm still going to leave my options open." Donovan denied that he was "fed up" of playing Scott, but he felt that he had "fulfilled that part of me as far as acting is concerned." Network Ten's publicity director, Brian Walsh, was confident that Neighbours would continue to be a success after Donovan's departure and thanked him for his work promoting the show during his tenure. He added: "Jason was one of the new talents fostered by Neighbours and the series will continue to develop others." Donovan filmed his final episode in April, and it aired on 18 May 1989. Scott leaves Erinsborough to join Charlene.

In 2009, Donovan revealed that he had been asked to return to the show for the 25th anniversary celebrations. He could not return due to work commitments, but he said that he was "very proud" of having been in Neighbours. Donovan was invited to return for the 30th anniversary celebrations in 2015, but he declined the offer, commenting "it's just not something I want to do." However, he agreed to take part in the documentary special Neighbours 30th: The Stars Reunite, which aired in Australia and the UK in March 2015.

In March 2022, Fiona Byrne of the Herald Sun reported on 1 May that both Donovan and Minogue were set to reprise their roles. Byrne believed Donovan and Minogue had filmed a guest appearance on Pin Oak Court, the outdoor location for Ramsay Street, during the previous week. Later on the same day, the return of Donovan and Minogue was confirmed on Neighbours' social media accounts. Executive producer Jason Herbison stated: "Scott and Charlene are the ultimate Neighbours couple and it would not feel right to end the show without them. We are thrilled that Jason and Kylie have come home to play a very special part in our series finale. It has been an emotional experience for them, for us and I'm sure it will be for our viewers." They appeared in was believed (at the time) to be the show's final ever episode. Subsequently, Amazon announced that they had picked up the series for their Freevee streaming service, and Amazon started filming the revived series in April 2023.

== Storylines ==
Scott lives on Ramsay Street with his father Jim, grandmother Helen Daniels and his siblings Paul, Julie and Lucy. Scott's mother, Anne died giving birth to Lucy. Scott becomes close friends with his neighbour Danny Ramsay. Scott falls for his classmate Kim Taylor but her mother, teacher Marcia (Maureen Edwards) disapproves. When Danny and Eddie Sherwin (Darren Boyd) doctor a recorded conversation between Scott and Kim to make sound more sexual than it really it is, Marcia forces Eddie to play the tape in class which humiliates Kim. Despite Scott protesting his innocence, The Taylors forbid him to see Kim and threaten to call the police. Scott and Kim then run away and hide out in an abandoned monastery. Scott returns home but Kim runs away. Scott later tracks down Kim who is pregnant and helps her reconcile with Marcia. Scott and Danny witness their neighbour Carol Brown (Merrin Canning) being mugged and try to go to her aid but she accuse them of attacking her, prompting the boys to flee and hide out on Mrs. Forbes' (Gwen Plumb) farm where they work for her, tending to her land. They eventually return home. Scott and Danny then squabble over Wendy Gibson (Kylie Foster) but eventually patch up their friendship.

When Scott is late back from a school trip, Jim and Helen worry and further grief comes when the police find a body of a 16-year-old boy in the river, with Scott's wallet. Jim goes to identify the body and is relieved it is not Scott. Scott (now Donovan) phones from a country hospital and explains he ran away from the school trip after being accused of rape and tried to hitch a lift but was mugged in the process. Soon after, Scott notices someone breaking into Number 24, the house next door to his. On challenging the intruder, he receives a punch for his troubles. Madge Mitchell arrives on the scene to discover it is her daughter Charlene, who has not seen Scott since they were children.

Scott befriends Mike Young. Scott and Charlene begin dating and go through teething problems. Scott proposes and Charlene accepts. Jim and Madge are against the engagement. Helen acts as a mediator and points out that Jim and Anne were roughly Scott and Charlene's age when they got married. Scott and Charlene marry and soon move into Number 24 together. Their marriage's first test comes when Jane Harris starts to help Scott with his HSC retakes, they become close and kiss. Charlene wants nothing to do with either of them upon finding out. Jane eventually convinces Charlene to give Scott another chance. Scott and Charlene's marriage undergoes another test when Steve Fisher (Michael Pope) begins giving Charlene driving lessons and attempts to make advances on her, but Scott and Charlene reconcile towards their first anniversary.

Charlene is offered a mechanic apprenticeship in Brisbane and is forced to make the difficult choice of leaving Erinsborough and the couple share an emotional farewell. Scott stays on at Number 24, but visits her frequently. During Charlene's absence, Scott fights off the affections of Sylvie Latham and later Poppy Skouros, before moving to Brisbane for good. Scott and Charlene later have two children, a son Daniel (Tim Phillipps) and daughter named Madison (Sarah Ellen).

Thirty-three years following his departure, Scott returns to Ramsay Street with Charlene after being invited by Charlene's cousin Shane Ramsay (Peter O'Brien). Scott and Charlene find that no one is home, so they go to Number 24 and reminisce over when they first met. During a Ramsay Street party, Scott and Charlene are reunited with Jane and Mike. Scott also sees Paul and Harold Bishop (Ian Smith), and they continue partying.

== Reception ==
Scott during the wedding episode of Neighbours, a notable storyline for the character.

For his portrayal of Scott, Donovan won Most Popular New Talent at the 1987 Logie Awards. A year later, he won the Logie Award for Most Popular Actor and was nominated for the Gold Logie Award for Most Popular Personality on Australian Television. Donovan was again nominated for the Gold Logie in his final year on Neighbours in 1989.

When the role was recast from Perkins to Donovan, some viewers protested the change. Shortly after his debut as Scott, Donovan was named one of the "New Faces of '86" by Jacqueline Lee Lewes of The Sydney Morning Herald. She said the network had already received feedback about his popularity. Kate Jackson and Sara Wallis of the Daily Mirror called Scott "the boy next door". Sue Heath from The Northern Echo joked that Scott's mullet "remains one of the great TV crimes of the century". In 1998, writers from Inside Soap included Scott in an article about the top ten characters they wanted to return to soap, and they described him as "a clean-cut boy next door who won the nation's hearts when he married his sweetheart, Charlene." In a review of the serial, Linton Mitchell of the Reading Evening Post admitted to being a fan of Charlene, but did not like Scott, calling him a "selfish drip of a husband".

In her book Soap opera, Dorothy Hobson praised Scott's on-screen relationship with Charlene, branding them positive, immense images for young people. Ruth Deller of television website Lowculture gave Scott a 3.5 out of 5 for his contribution to Neighbours, during a feature called "A guide to recognising your Ramsays and Robinsons". Deller said "One of the many Robinsons to undergo a hair and face transplant, Scott soon transformed from a dull brunette into Jason Donovan. An all-round nice guy, Scott was part of the first (and best) iconic Neighbours teen gangs, with Jane, Mike and Charlene. She added that his relationship with Charlene was a "Romeo and Juliet style romance". In 2010, to celebrate Neighbours' 25th anniversary, satellite broadcasting company, Sky, included Scott in their feature of the 25 most memorable characters from Neighbours. Summing up his time in the serial, they stated: "Scott Robinson is really only remembered these days for his teen romance, but his track record on the show could perhaps be better summarised in music. Early on, Scott formed a band with Mike 'Guy Pearce' Young. He eventually married Kylie and made Angry Anderson the soundtrack of people's memories of the eighties forever more." Donna Hay from What's on TV included Scott and Charlene in their "marriages made in heaven" feature and branded them "Ramsay Street's answer to Antony and Cleopatra". Hay recalled they had a "stormy courtship" and "more rows than the Tories, but they proved their parents wrong."

Scott and Charlene's wedding was seen by 20 million viewers in the United Kingdom and was voted the "Most Romantic TV Nuptials of all Time". The wedding episode made the cover of TIME magazine Australia and Minogue and Donovan's promotional appearance at the Westfield Parramatta shopping centre caused a stampede among 4000 people. In October 2006, Australia Post brought out five stamps celebrating fifty years of television. Network Ten's stamp featured both Minogue and Donovan as Charlene and Scott. Andrew Mercado, author of Super Aussie Soaps, observed that Scott's romance with Charlene became hugely popular with Neighbours viewers in both the United Kingdom and Australia, helping the show to gain high ratings after an initial rocky start. In 2011, Scott's wedding to Charlene was placed at number three in Channel 5's "Greatest TV Weddings" programme. In 2015, a Herald Sun reporter included Scott and Charlene's wedding in their "Neighbours' 30 most memorable moments" feature.

In 2000, Paul Brooks from Soaplife included Scott and Charlene in his list of "dream lovers". He assessed that they are "Erinsborough's own Romeo and Juliet" that viewers "were oohing and aahing to the love story" of. He added that "handsome" Scott was "the dream boyfriend". In 2022, Kate Randall from Heat stated that Scott and Charlene were "arguably the show's most iconic characters with their wedding attracting more than 20 million viewers." Scott was placed at number nine on the Huffpost's "35 greatest Neighbours characters of all time" feature. Journalist Adam Beresford described him as a "nice guy" and one half of "the Neighbours golden couple". He stated that viewers "all soon became obsessed by their suburban Romeo & Juliet relationship." He called him one of the show's original male pin-ups and their charm "reflected a more innocent time." In a feature profiling the "top 12 iconic Neighbours characters", critic Sheena McGinley of the Irish Independent placed Scott as her seventh choice. She said that despite being played by two actors, "when it comes to Scott Robinson, there's only one face everyone remembers — that being a mini-mulleted Jason Donovan." Lorna White from Yours profiled the magazine's "favourite Neighbours characters of all time". Scott was included in the list and White stated that the Scott and Charlene relationship boosted ratings. A reporter from The Scotsman included Scott and Charlene's wedding as one of the show's top five moments in its entire history. Sam Strutt of The Guardian compiled a feature counting down the top ten most memorable moments from Neighbours. Strutt listed Scott and Charlene's wedding as number one.

== See also ==
- Scott Robinson and Charlene Mitchell
