= Sam Clark =

Australian actor, singer-songwriter

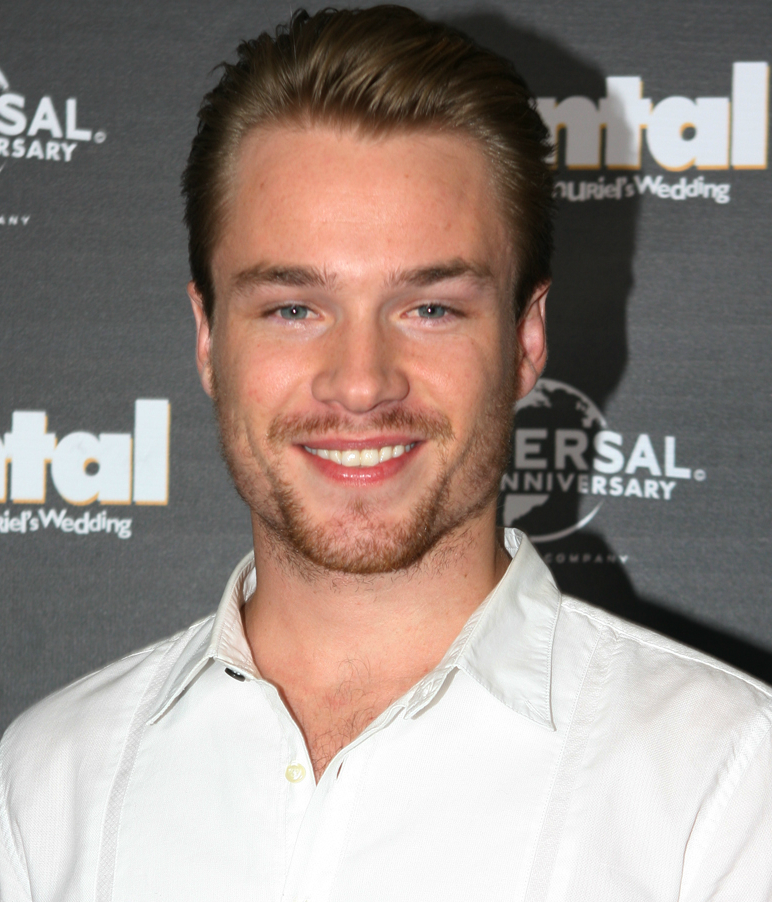

Background information
- Born: Samuel James Clark; 18 October 1987 (age 39); Adelaide, Australia
- Origin: Melbourne, Australia
- Genre: Pop rock
- Occupations: Actor; singer; songwriter
- Instruments: Vocals; guitar
- Years active: 2007–present
- Label: Independent
- Website: samclarkofficial.com

Samuel James Clark (born 18 October 1987) is an Australian actor, singer-songwriter, best known for his role as Ringo Brown on the Australian soap opera, Neighbours and Leo in the Fox/Paramount live musical television special Grease: Live. Clark made his musical debut in 2009 with the single "Broken", which peaked at number one on the Australian Physical Singles Chart His third single "Devastated" also peaked at number one on the same chart. In August 2010, Clark released his debut studio album, Take Me Home.

== Early life ==
Clark was born in Adelaide. He is a graduate of St. Andrew's Primary School and St Peter's College, and was a keen participant in several high school theatre productions, including a main role in West Side Story. In 2006, Clark formed a group (originally a duo) called, Solid White Line with members, Jake Long and James Brown.

== Acting career ==
Clark won the role of Ringo Brown after auditioning for a nationwide Dolly Magazine competition with Adelaide Kane; as the winner, he won a three-month contract with the show, which was later extended. Clark made his Neighbours debut on 24 January 2007. The character was actually three years younger than Clark's actual age. Clark went through a long audition process compared with other Neighbours cast members, as he had to audition four times. On entering the show, Clark described Ringo as a "good-hearted kid", who does the normal things that a 16-year-old kid does. For his portrayal of Ringo, Clark earned a nomination for the Logie Award for Most Popular New Male Talent.

In 2009, Clark took a three-month break from Neighbours to focus on his music career. He returned to filming in February 2010. That July, Clark announced that he would be leaving Neighbours in order to focus more on his music career. He said "I love acting and I'm definitely going to strive for further success in that part of my life, however music has always been a passion and I want to give it my all right now."

In 2012, Clark appeared in P. J. Hogan's Mental, alongside Toni Collette and Anthony LaPaglia. He also wrote four songs for the soundtrack.

In 2016, Clark made his U.S. television debut as Leo "Craterface" Balmudo in the Fox/Paramount live musical television special Grease: Live, alongside Vanessa Hudgens, Julianne Hough and Aaron Tveit under the direction of Tommy Kail (Hamilton).

== Music career ==
=== 2009–2010: Take Me Home ===
Since 2009, Clark has released his music through PLW Entertainment. "Broken" the debut single from Clark, was released in November 2009 The single peaked at number thirty nine on the ARIA Singles Chart It has had a better impact on other charts where it peaked at number one on the Australian Physical Singles Chart and at number eleven on the Australian Singles Charts (chart only for Australian origin) The second single, "Send Me a Sign" was released on 22 April 2010 and first premiered during an episode of Neighbours, where Clark sang it in character as Ringo Brown. The single failed to make an impact on the charts and had no physical release.

In July 2010, Clark released his third single, "Devastated" which debuted at number one on the Australian Physical Singles Chart. This single included the bonus track of "Suddenly", Clark's modern take on the original song by Angry Anderson, which was played in an episode of Neighbours during his character's (Ringo Brown) wedding to Donna Freedman (Margot Robbie). In August 2010, Clark began a five-week national tour across Australia, visiting fifty schools to promote the single and to also talk about his commitment to giving blood as an ambassador for the Red Cross Blood Service. Clark's debut album Take Me Home was released on 20 August

=== 2011–present: My Own Way ===
In November 2011, Clark made his first independent release with EP My Own Way. He described the sound as "more folk and acoustic". The following year, he made an appearance at Bents Park as part of the South Tyneside Summer Festival concerts, alongside Matt Cardle and Ryan O'Shaughnessy.

== Discography ==
Sam Clark discography
- Studio albums: 1
- Extended plays: 1
- Singles: 3
- Music videos: 3

=== Studio albums ===
Title	Album details
Take Me Home	Released: 20 August 2010; Label: PLW Entertainment; Format: CD, digital download

=== Extended plays ===
Title	EP details
My Own Way	Released: 4 November 2011; Label: Samuel Clark; Formats: CD, digital download

=== Singles ===
Year	Single	Chart positions	Album
Year	Single	AUS	Album
2009	"Broken"	39	Take Me Home
2010	"Send Me a Sign"	—	Take Me Home
2010	"Devastated"	—	Take Me Home
"—" denotes releases that did not chart or receive certification

=== Music videos ===
Year	Title	Director
2009	"Broken"	Tom Marks
2010	"Send Me a Sign"	Joel Kohn
2010	"Devastated"	Joel Kohn

== Filmography ==
Year	Title	Role	Notes
2007–2010	Neighbours	Ringo Brown	Series regular
2012	Miss Fisher's Murder Mysteries	Paul Waddington	
2012	Mental	Trout	
2016	Dance Night Obsession	Officer Kirby	
2016	Monday at 11:01 AM	Bellhop	
2016	Grease: Live	Leo Balmudo	
2018	Friends from College	David Beckham impersonator	
2019	Tell Me I Love You	Ben O'Shea	
2022	Death Camp	Austin	

== Awards and nominations ==
Year	Award	Category	Work	Result	Ref.
2007	Inside Soap Awards	Best Newcomer	Neighbours	Nominated	
2008	Logie Awards	Most Popular New Male Talent	Neighbours	Nominated	
2009	Inside Soap Awards	Sexiest Male	Neighbours	Nominated	
2010	CLEO Bachelor of the Year	Bachelor of the Year	—N/a	Nominated	
