= Cassandra Freedman =

- Neighbours character
- Portrayed by: Tottie Goldsmith
- First appearance: 10 February 2009
- Last appearance: 29 April 2009
- Introduced by: Susan Bower
In-universe information
- Occupation: Receptionist
- Husband: Matt Freedman (divorced)
- Sons: Simon Freedman
- Daughters: Donna Freedman; Tegan Freedman

Cassandra Freedman is a fictional character from the Australian soap opera Neighbours, played by Tottie Goldsmith. She made her first screen appearance during the episode broadcast on 10 February 2009. Goldsmith did not have to audition for the role of Cassandra and was instead chosen by the producers for the role. The actress began filming her first scenes at the end of September 2008. She was initially contracted for six weeks, but this was extended after she impressed the producers with her performance. Goldsmith filmed her final scenes in January 2009 and Cassandra's departure was aired on 29 April 2009.

Cassandra is the ex-wife of Matt Freedman (Benjamin Mitchell) and mother of Donna (Margot Robbie), Tegan (Chelsea Jones) and Simon Freedman (Mauricio Merino, Jr.). Goldsmith described Cassandra as a troublemaker, a femme fatale and insanely selfish, while Digital Spy's Darren Rowe called her "seductive and troublesome". Rather than being their parent, Cassandra acts like a jealous sister towards her children and Goldsmith revealed that she is not a maternal person. She had Donna when she was young and often resented her, while Tegan was her partner in crime. Cassandra moves to Ramsay Street to find herself a wealthy man and sets her sights on Paul Robinson (Stefan Dennis).

== Casting ==
On 7 September 2008, Fiona Byrne from the Herald Sun revealed that Goldsmith had been cast as Cassandra Freedman, mother of Donna Freedman played by Margot Robbie. The actress stated "I have been cast as a bit of a yummy mummy, which is great because I am 46 and I am a mother and I love that I am getting a meaty role instead of being cast as a plain old boring mum." Goldsmith did not have to audition for the role, instead she was specifically chosen for it by the Neighbours producers'. She explained "They actually offered me the role - it was not an audition situation. It was lovely to be asked and that they think I can nail this character." Goldsmith was initially contracted to the show for six weeks and she began filming her first scenes at the end of the month. She made her first screen appearance as Cassandra on 10 February 2009.

In November, Byrne announced that the Neighbours producers had been so impressed with Goldsmith's performance as Cassandra, that they extended her contract with the show by a further six weeks. Goldsmith commented that she was "so happy" to be working on Neighbours. The actress completed filming on her three-month stint in January 2009. Goldsmith told Byrne's colleague, Luke Dennehy, that working on the serial had helped distract her from the breakdown of a relationship. She also stated that she had had "the time of her life", never guessing that she would have loved it so much. Goldsmith made her final appearance as Cassandra on 29 April 2009.

== Development ==
=== Characterisation ===
"Even when I read the script and she's absolutely out of control and naughty, after getting over the shock, it's hilarious. She really tries to be a good mum, but she doesn't quite have it in her."

— Goldsmith on Cassandra

Shortly before making her first screen appearance, Goldsmith revealed that she accepted the role of Cassandra because she thought "the character sounded really quirky and out-there and it seemed like lots of fun." The actress called Cassandra "pretty fun" and "a risk taker". She thought she might be classified as a troublemaker and a femme fatale, before revealing that there would be some comedy in the role too. Darren Rowe from Digital Spy described Cassandra as "seductive and troublesome", while a writer for Yahoo!7 called her a cougar. Goldsmith later branded her character "a real piece of work", before adding "Cassandra's a vixen, she's manipulative, she's vulnerable. She only sees the world through her eyes, and what she can get from every situation. She's insanely selfish... but so much fun!"

A Sunday Mercury reporter thought Cassandra was "glamorous" and "not exactly a woman in need". Goldsmith said that Cassandra's flair for the dramatic earned her a mixed response from the neighbours, who she found to be boring. The actress added that Cassandra was ready to "spice things up" around the place. When asked by Jackie Brygel of TV Week if Cassandra had "a fabulous and rather naughty wardrobe", Goldsmith replied that while it is not really naughty, Cassandra does tend to dress like she would have done when she was in her twenties. She often wears a lot of revealing outfits, which do not "leave a lot of room for loose change."

=== Family ===
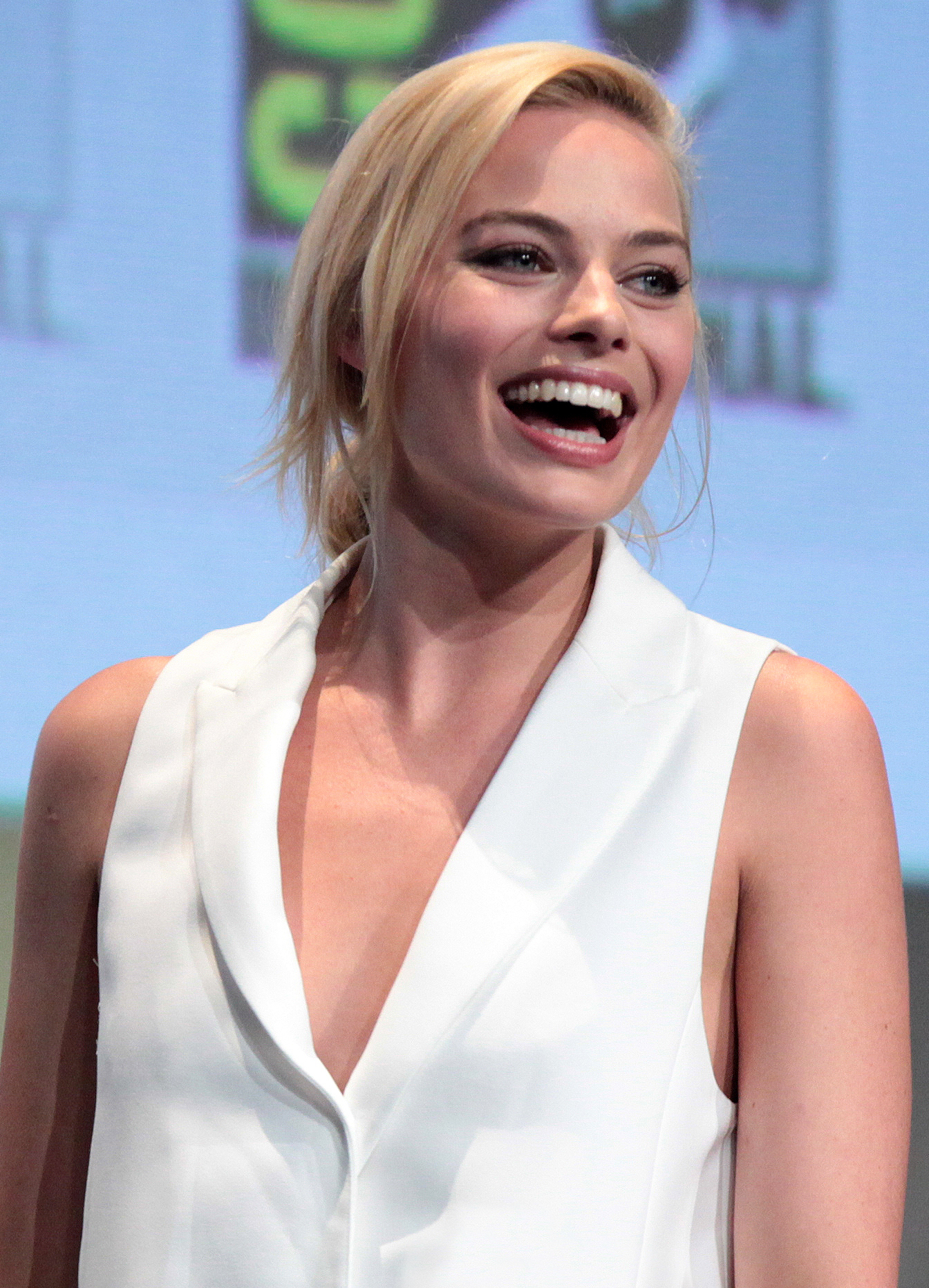
Margot Robbie portrayed Cassandra's daughter, Donna.

Cassandra is the mother of Donna, Tegan (Chelsea Jones) and Simon Freedman (Mauricio Merino, Jr.). When she arrived in Ramsay Street she was going through a "nightmare divorce" with Matt Freedman (Benjamin Mitchell). A Holy Soap writer stated that Cassandra acted like "a jealous big sister" towards her children, rather than being their parent. Goldsmith elaborated on this further during an interview with Inside Soap's Jason Herbison, saying that "Sass isn't a maternal person and has never been able to connect with her kids". She explained that Cassandra was very young when she had Donna and did not have the maturity to deal with motherhood. She often resented Donna and eventually saw her as a threat. Over the years, Cassandra has hurt Donna so much that her daughter has "almost become immune" to her mother's behaviour. Goldsmith noted that Tegan, Cassandra's youngest daughter, is her partner in crime.

=== Paul Robinson ===
Goldsmith explained to Herbison that Cassandra chose to move to Ramsay Street after learning that there was a Salvation Army house for families in need available. She believed that her family fit the bill. However, the real reason she came to town was to find herself a man and she set her sights on wealthy resident, Paul Robinson (Stefan Dennis). Cassandra used her "feminine wiles" to make him fall for her. When Paul's former girlfriend, Rebecca Napier (Jane Hall), played an April Fool's Day prank on her, Cassandra vowed revenge and framed her rival for selling alcohol to minors. However, Cassandra underestimated Paul's loyalty to Rebecca and decided to get revenge on him too, by accusing him of stalking her. The neighbours were left unsure as to whether Paul was guilty or not when Cassandra filed a harassment charge with the police. Rebecca defended him and Donna decided to try to find out the truth by moving in with her mother. Cassandra's lie was eventually exposed and she was "forced to make a grovelling apology."

== Storylines ==
Cassandra arrives in Erinsborough and goes to Charlie's bar, where she bumps into Paul Robinson, who mistakes her for a prostitute. Cassandra tells him that she is a receptionist, but that does not mean she has to dress like one. She then heads to Ramsay Street, to move into the Salvation Army owned refuge at Number 24. Cassandra's daughter, Donna, is shocked to see her mother. and begs her not to ruin anything for her, as she has grown fond of the neighbours. Cassandra follows Donna back to her house and runs into Paul again. She allows her daughter to stay where she is, but vows that they will sort their issues out. It is soon revealed that Cassandra had sent her youngest children, Tegan and Simon, ahead to check out the residents of Ramsay Street. When she spots Paul on the street, Cassandra deliberately traps her dress in her car door and then strips to her underwear. She later kisses Paul, who allows himself to be seduced by her. Cassandra tries unsuccessfully to get Paul to give her an advertising sales job at his newspaper, but she finds herself a job at the hospital as a receptionist.

Cassandra sees Paul's friend, Samantha Fitzgerald (Simone Buchanan), as a threat and decides to read her hospital file. She learns that Sam has bipolar disorder and decides to confront her, but Sam blurts out that she had no idea that her ex-husband was not the father of her baby. Sam realises her mistake too late and Cassandra uses the information to blackmail her. Cassandra tells Sam to talk to Donna and convince her to give her mother a chance. When Donna has an argument with her boyfriend, Ringo Brown (Sam Clark), Cassandra invites him to stay the night with her. Donna becomes upset with her mother and when she realises that Paul and Sam are on her side, Donna is forced to move in with her family. Cassandra arranges a date with Paul, but she is furious when he stands her up. She argues with Sam and accidentally reveals the truth about her baby to Stephanie Scully (Carla Bonner), leaving her without a reason to blackmail her anymore. Cassandra later learns that Simon glued Paul's doors shut to stop him going on the date and potentially breaking her heart.

Cassandra gets herself invited to Libby Kennedy (Kym Valentine) and Daniel Fitzgerald's (Brett Tucker) wedding, knowing that Paul will be there. She steals the wedding outfits from the dry cleaners and then offers to help make some new dresses. During the reception, Paul's daughter, Elle (Pippa Black), locks Cassandra in a storeroom to give Paul some time with Rebecca Napier. Believing that Paul is slipping away from her, Cassandra calls Rebecca's ex-boyfriend, Andrew Simpson (Peter Flanigan), and tells him how much Rebecca misses him. Andrew and Rebecca get back together, while Cassandra comforts Paul. She begins causing problems for her children, especially Tegan. Cassandra encourages her daughter to shorten her school skirt to attract the boys, but it backfires when Tegan is bullied by Kyle Canning (Chris Milligan). Cassandra is angry when Tegan alters her skirts back, but Tegan stands up to her and reveals that she hates dressing like her mother. Cassandra finds Kyle helping Tegan with her chemistry project and starts flirting with him, angering Tegan once more.

Cassandra learns that Simon stole an iPod and becomes annoyed that her children are rebelling. When Tegan goes to Bridget Parker (Eloise Mignon) for fashion advice, Cassandra insults her and is thrown out by Bridget's mother. Cassandra accidentally purchases a fake scratchcard meant for someone else and believes that she has won $20,000. After Rebecca tells her the truth, Cassandra thinks she is behind the prank and decides to get revenge on her. She asks Tegan to order her an alcoholic drink at the bar, making sure that Rebecca thinks that she will come and collect it. Tegan picks the drink up and Cassandra announces that Rebecca has sold alcohol to a minor, before threatening to call the police. However, not many people believe her and Paul turns against her. Simon and Tegan become fed up with their mother and leave to stay with their grandmother. Cassandra seeks revenge on Paul and claims that he has been harassing her. Cassandra begins receiving threatening notes and after a silent phone call, she becomes scared. She later makes a public apology for her actions.

Cassandra also tries to be nice to the neighbours and encourages Donna to audition for the school play. But she becomes jealous of her daughter's success and makes sure she ruins her second audition. Cassandra learns that Donna is her stalker and reports her to the police, despite Elle asking her not to. Cassandra tries to make things right with Donna by offering to help make costumes for the play. However, she mocks her daughter during a rehearsal and accuses Daniel of coming on to her when she sees him comforting her. The Ramsay Street residents later decide to get rid of Cassandra. She is fired from her job for being late, barred from Charlie's and Harold's Store by Elle and reported to the Salvation Army for not needing their house. Cassandra realises that she has been defeated and decides to leave, but not before telling Donna that a guy named Nick is actually her father and not the man who raised her. Cassandra then packs her bags and drives out of the street, knocking over everyone's bins as she goes.

== Reception ==
For her portrayal of Cassandra, Goldsmith was nominated for "Best Bitch" at the 2009 Inside Soap Awards. John Burfitt from TV Soap named Cassandra one of Neighbours' "greatest bitches". He stated that she was "The meanest mum and toughest tart ever in Ramsay Street" and nicknamed her "Cyclone Cass." A writer for Holy Soap said Cassandra's most memorable moment was "When she accidentally-on-purpose got her dress caught in her car door, allowing her to strip down to her undies." A Daily Record reporter hoped that Cassandra would be run out of town as way of justice for her bad deeds. They added "We know you need villains to spice the drama up a bit – but she's something else. Cass is manipulative, spiteful and downright nasty. In fact, she gives women a bad name." A writer for the Sunday Mercury thought Cassandra was "one of the most annoying characters Ramsay Street has ever seen", while a Western Mail reporter called her the "mother from hell." A writer from Metro called Cassandra "manipulative".

A Sunday Mail reporter commented that Cassandra had turned out to be "one of the most irritating characters ever to grace Ramsay Street." Tim Elliott, writing for The Sydney Morning Herald, was positive towards the character. He stated that most viewers were trying to avoid suburban reality and wanted melodrama, which "resident bitch" Cassandra provided. He added "When not washing her car in spray-on jeans, Cassandra is delivering bottles of chilled champagne to distressed neighbour Paul. Everyone hates Cassandra, perhaps because she is a single mother (boo!) but also because she is a single mother who is having fun (double boo!). All the other characters - footy jock Ringo, Donna and responsible Rebecca - are way too real and suburban for me." Gordon Farrer from The Age branded Cassandra a "yummy mummy." Cassandra came third in an Inside Soap poll to find out which Neighbours character readers would miss most following their departure. Cassandra received 10% of the vote.
