= Donna Freedman =

Fictional character from the Australian soap opera Neighbours

- Neighbours character
- Portrayed by: Margot Robbie
- Duration: 2008–2011, 2022
- First appearance: 2 June 2008
- Last appearance: 28 July 2022
- Introduced by: Ric Pellizzeri and Susan Bower (2008); Jason Herbison (2022)
In-universe information
- Other names: Donna Brown
- Occupation: Student; Fashion designer
- Father: Nick Nixon
- Mother: Cassandra Freedman
- Stepfather: Matt Freedman
- Half-brothers: Simon Freedman
- Half-sisters: Tegan Freedman
- Husband: Ringo Brown (2010)

Donna Freedman (also Brown) is a fictional character from the Australian soap opera Neighbours, played by Margot Robbie. She made her first screen appearance during the episode broadcast on 2 June 2008. Donna was initially introduced as a guest character, but Robbie was promoted to the regular cast shortly after she made her debut. Donna was originally portrayed as an obsessive fan of musician Ty Harper (Dean Geyer) and someone who had a desire for friends and acceptance. After befriending the teens of Ramsay Street, Donna changes her ways and matures into a warm, loveable girl. She has been described as being fiery, beautiful, kooky and confident.

The character's storylines included a relationship with Ringo Brown (Sam Clark) whom she later married, a same-sex kiss with Sunny Lee (Hany Lee), the introduction of her family, and an affair with Andrew Robinson (Jordan Patrick Smith). The character became popular with viewers and Robbie earned various award nominations for her portrayal of Donna, including two Logie Award nominations. In April 2010, it was revealed that Robbie had told producers she would like to leave when her contract expired at the end of the year. Five months later, it was announced that Robbie had quit Neighbours and she departed on 26 January 2011. Robbie made a guest appearance in the show's finale episode on 28 July 2022.

== Casting ==
When Robbie was 17, she moved to Melbourne and repeatedly contacted the serial's casting director Jan Russ to ask for a meeting. Eventually Russ agreed to see her and when she learned how old Robbie was, she revealed that they were casting for the role of a 17-year-old girl. Robbie auditioned for the role of Donna in 2008. She believed that she had performed badly in the audition and decided to leave for a five-week snowboarding holiday in Canada. Robbie had been in Canada for two days when she received a phone call telling her that she had been successful and that she had to return to Australia. Robbie began appearing on-screen in June of that year. Donna was originally supposed to have a guest character role, but Robbie was promoted to the main cast shortly after her debut.

In April 2010, it was revealed that producers were "battling" to keep Robbie with the show after she told them that she would like to leave when her contract expired at the end of the year. Producers began negotiating with Robbie to renew her contract and a spokesperson said "Margot isn't going anywhere for a long while yet. Producers love the character of Donna Freedman and there's plenty in store for her in the coming months, particularly in terms of her on-off romance with Ringo."

== Development ==
=== Characterisation ===
Donna's personality evolves and develops throughout her time on the show. Donna arrives as an obsessed groupie of Ty Harper (Dean Geyer), who manages to force her way into the Ramsay Street teen group. Donna has no one to turn to and buries her love in the music scene and Ty, who becomes her focus for love and acceptance. Donna is driven by a fierce need for approval and acceptance, which makes her try too hard. Robbie revealed that she shares some of Donna's characteristics. She said "[Donna]'s fiery and outgoing and I'm a bit like that. Sometimes I can be too loud and say things when I shouldn't. But I don't stalk people. Other than that, we're kind of similar."

"Donna comes across as super confident, but underneath there is a teenager screaming out for love and affection, just a little too loudly."

— Network Ten on the character of Donna (2008)

TV Week described Donna as "beautiful and a free spirit who is also a little loud and obnoxious", while the Metro called her "kooky." The teens of Ramsay Street warm to her eventually and with their help, Donna changes her ways and becomes accepted. The official Neighbours website stated that Donna had become a warm, loveable, charming and playful girl. Her integration into the street and the lives of the other residents matured Donna and she led the normal life she always wanted. In May 2009, Robbie said that Donna was a "really likeable character" and that she got to play out funny and crazy storylines while playing her. In November of that year, it was revealed that Robbie had begged the scriptwriters to let Donna go off the rails or go to rehab. Robbie said that she would like a dramatic storyline, but the show's G rating made it difficult. Robbie also said that she enjoyed playing Donna, as she was "great" and a "bit crazy". She added "I'm really glad I get to play her and not an average, boring teenage girl. You can be an average, boring teenage girl every other day of the week. It's fun to be able to say and do these things you normally wouldn't".

=== Family ===
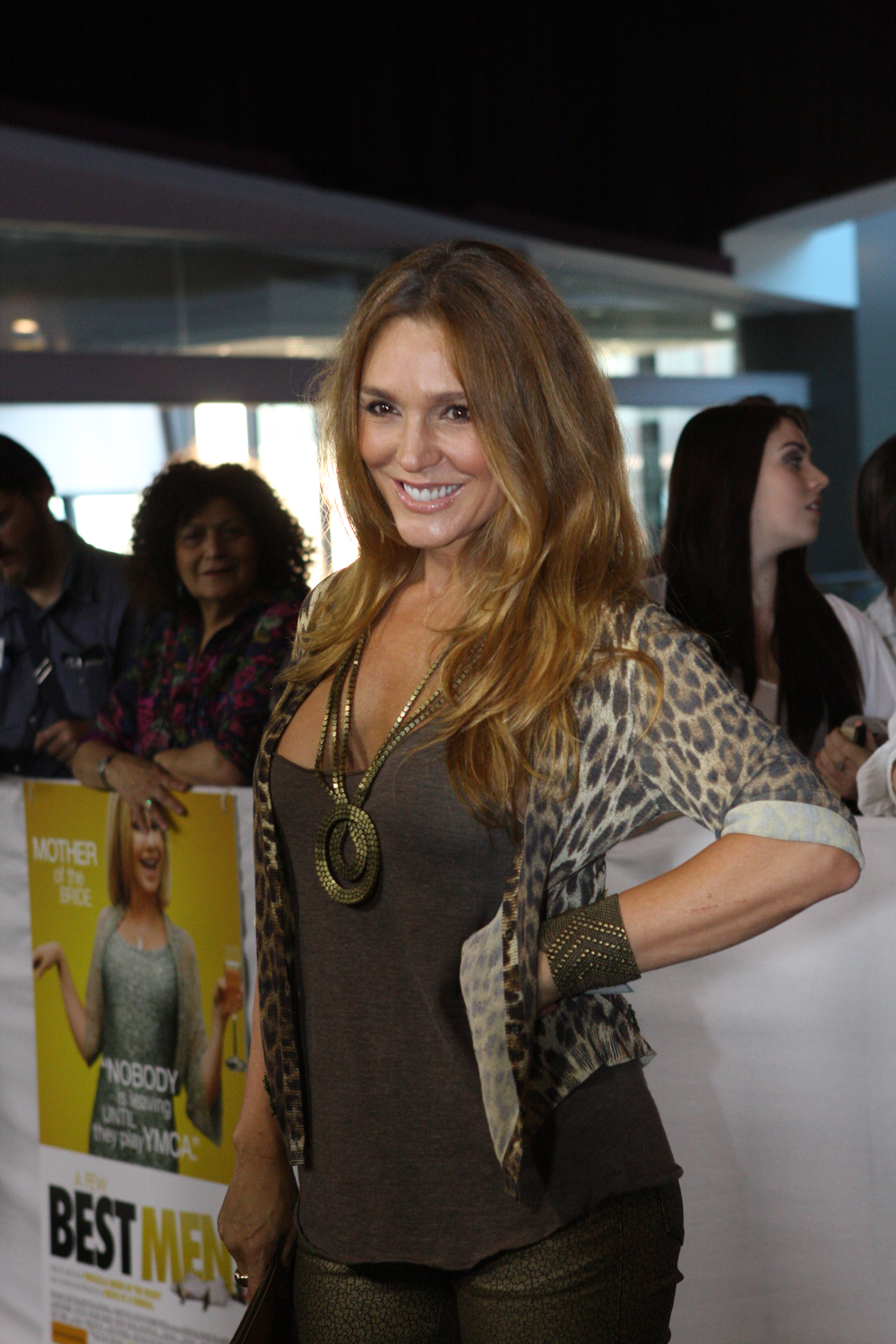
Tottie Goldsmith played Donna's mother, Cassandra

Donna initially lives with and is cared for by her father, Matt Freedman (Benjamin Mitchell), but after he tries to cover up a hit-and-run accident that Donna commits, he tells her that he must leave or face jail. Donna is hurt and humiliated when he leaves her alone. Donna eventually confesses to Elle Robinson (Pippa Black) that Matt has left and Donna moves in with Elle, who later becomes her guardian. At the end of 2008, Donna's younger brother and sister, Simon (Mauricio Merino, Jr.) and Tegan (Chelsea Jones) were introduced to the show. Merino and Jones won three-month contracts with the show through a competition with Dolly magazine. It was announced that the siblings would be "Donna's worst nightmare" and they were described as "cheeky" and "pesky". Robbie said she was looking forward to the arrival of Donna's siblings and developing her character further with their introductions. She added "The more storylines I do, the more real my character becomes. Now, I can do things and relate to her and understand where she's coming from".

Following the introduction of her siblings, Donna's mother was also introduced in February 2009. Australian actress and singer Tottie Goldsmith was given the role of Cassandra Freedman. Goldsmith described her character as being "manipulative" and "insanely selfish". Donna and her mother clash on many occasions as Cassandra had hurt her daughter a lot in the past. Cassandra was a young girl when she had Donna and she did not have the maturity to deal with a baby. Goldsmith said that Cassandra "resented Donna and saw her as a threat. Over the years, Cass has hurt Donna so much that her daughter's almost become immune to the way her mother behaves". Goldsmith added that Cassandra is not a "maternal person" and she has not been able to connect with her children. Cassandra moves into the street in a bid to win over wealthy resident, Paul Robinson (Stefan Dennis). She is later driven out of town after she makes her relationship with Donna worse.

Just before Cassandra leaves town, she tells Donna that Matt, the man who raised her, is not her biological father. Cassandra tells Donna that her real father is a man named Nick. In 2009, it was announced that Donna's father had been cast and would be introduced the following year. Brian Vriends was given the role of Nick Nixon. Of the introduction of Brian and Nick, executive producer, Susan Bower said "The Freedman family have provided fantastic drama for us so far and we have lots in store for Brian, it's great to have him with us. This is just one of many, many great storylines we have coming up in 2010". Donna discovers that there are two men that could be her father and she contacts them both. Nick Nixon replies first and Donna begins to believe that he is her father. However, Professor Nicholas McKay (Chris Bunworth) later turns up and Donna becomes confused over the situation. Nicholas has just been released from jail and he is keen to do something right. However, he hurts Donna when he tells her that she is just like her mother and that she will run away. Robbie said "He takes a horrible approach". Nicholas' arrival makes Donna more afraid to find out the results of the DNA test she asked Nick to take. On the situation, Robbie said "She's a hopeless romantic and wants the happily ever after – not only with Ringo, but with her family." The DNA test eventually proves that Nick is her real father.

=== Bisexuality ===
When Robbie first began filming, she was told that Donna was bisexual. Of this Robbie said, "In one of the blocks she is talking to Bridget about their 'first time' and Donna asks Bridget if it was with a guy or girl? I liked the way the writers conveyed that, it was just really subtle and they didn't make a big coming out scene of it. I think it's a good message to send out because it's not such a big deal to lots of people. Not all of them have such drama surrounding it". Donna's first storyline that included this aspect of her character was a kiss between herself and fellow female character, Sunny Lee (Hany Lee). The kiss occurs after Donna discovers that Sunny has been writing the romantic love letters given to her by her boyfriend. Sunny is shocked when Donna leans over and kisses her on the lips, as it is her first kiss. The show's producers called the kiss between Sunny and Donna "impulsive" and Robbie agreed saying, "It's really not a big deal at all. It's not an actual gay storyline, it's just kind of an impulsive peck". The storyline came weeks after rival soap Home and Away endured a backlash to its own same-sex romance.

The storyline received attention from the Australian Family Association, with spokesman John Morrissey saying that he was concerned about TV "normalising" same-sex relationships. Psychologist Janet Hall praised the storyline, saying it allowed families to discuss the topic. Bower defended the kiss, which was shot before the Home and Away controversy, saying "Ours is a lovely tale about friendship. It's very innocent." She added "If we were going to do a lesbian story – and Neighbours is not against lesbian stories – we would do it properly. This is a teenage romance story. There's nothing sexual". In June 2009, Bower was asked if there were any plans to explore Donna's bisexuality, to which she replied that there were not. She said "We're getting an enormous amount of leverage with Donna being the person she is and there's just so much storyline with her and romance with Ringo that I'm not saying it's out of the question, but it's not in any planning stages now".

=== Relationship with Ringo Brown ===
Shortly after her character's arrival on-screen, Robbie said "There is some love coming up for Donna. She gets into a long term relationship and really falls for someone." Donna first kisses Ringo Brown (Sam Clark) at a kissing booth to get in with the established teen group. Donna and Ringo later begin a relationship, but when Donna wants to take things further, Ringo tells her that he wants to slow things down. Donna believes that she is being rejected and when she hears about Ringo's relationship with Carmella Cammeniti (Natalie Blair) and then sees them together, she confronts Ringo. Ringo then tries to convince Donna that his heart belongs to her. The couple's relationship goes through various problems. During a moment of time together at home, Donna leaves Ringo to retrieve the cat and the house is set alight. Donna is forced to rescue Ringo and drag him outside. After Zeke Kinski (Matthew Werkmeister) returns to Ramsay Street, Ringo believes that Donna had cheated on him with his friend and breaks up with her. Donna then goes to Zeke to seek solace, which leads to a love triangle between the three of them.

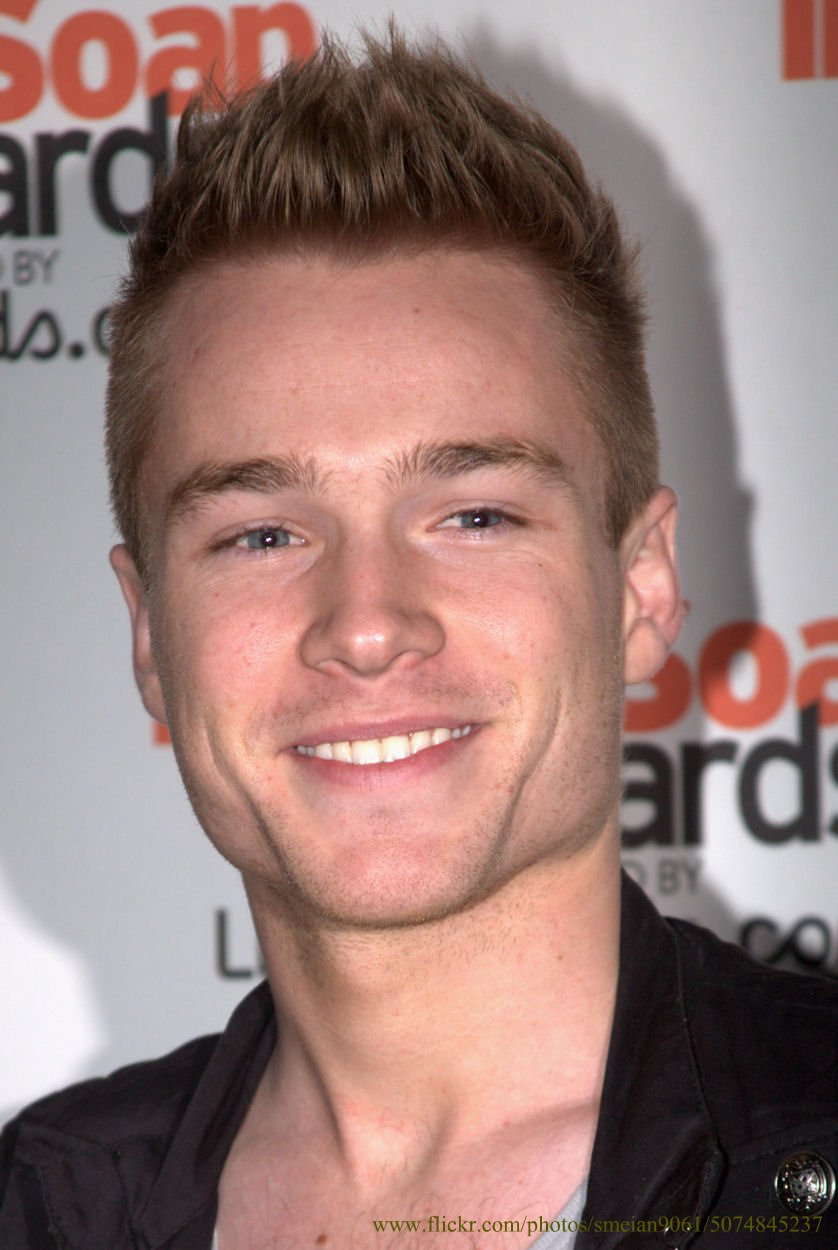
Sam Clark played Ringo Brown

Towards the end of 2009, Donna and Ringo's relationship goes through a rocky patch and during schoolies week, Donna sleeps with Andrew Robinson (Jordan Patrick Smith). Andrew later turns up in Erinsborough, much to Donna's shock. Robbie said that Donna begins to "freak out" because she did not expect to see Andrew again and now he could tell everyone what happened between them. Robbie added "Ringo and Donna were definitely going through a rocky patch for a while, but things were starting to look up. If she comes clean, they might find a way to work through it. But it doesn't look good." Sam Clark said that Ringo and Donna's love for each other is very strong, but he was not sure if it was strong enough to survive a betrayal. Robbie and Clark also said that the couple were heading in different directions career-wise and it would be challenging for them. Donna later begins an affair with Andrew after he helps her out and then puts pressure on her to give in to their attraction. Robbie said that Donna is "flattered" by Andrew's interest in her and when Ringo puts his career before her, Andrew tells Donna what she wants to hear. On Andrew and Donna's compatibility, Robbie said, "Andrew's more into the fashion scene than Ringo. He's suave and well-dressed, and he's an aspiring businessman. He's perfect for the world Donna is trying to get into." However, Robbie admitted that Ringo is the perfect guy for Donna as they balance each other out well. Ringo leaves for Sydney after finding out Donna cheated on him and when he returns his relationship with Donna is "frosty". Robbie commented on the ex-couple's future and said "I think at the moment it's quite in the balance. It's right up to the network at the moment as to whether they'll get back together or not."

Ringo and Donna later get back together and to prove that he loves her, Ringo proposes. In June 2010, it was revealed that the 6000th episode celebrations would see the wedding of Donna and Ringo. News.com reported that producers hoped that the wedding would "recreate the magic" of Scott Robinson (Jason Donovan) and Charlene Mitchell's (Kylie Minogue) 1987 wedding. Robbie said she had "big shoes to fill", but she was honoured to be working on her biggest storyline since she arrived. Clark said that Donna and Ringo made the decision that they are going to be with each other for life and that they are "going to be solid from now on". On the wedding day, Donna's car breaks down and she is forced to ride in the back of Lucas Fitzgerald's (Scott Major) truck. Donna walks down the aisle to Ringo's version of "Suddenly", the original song played at Scott and Charlene's wedding. Clark added "It's a perfect day, but I can't promise they'll live happily ever after." Donna and Ringo became the 36th couple to get married on the show. A month later, Ringo is knocked down by Stephanie Scully's (Carla Bonner) motorcycle and dies. Donna is devastated and she stays in her room. Steph comes to visit her and as she is apologising, Donna gets up and hugs her. Of Donna's reaction, Robbie said, "Donna is almost in a state of confusion and insists that the whole thing was an accident. Donna is just numb and she doesn't know what to feel."

=== Departure ===
In September 2010, Robbie confirmed rumours that she was to leave Neighbours after almost three years. Of her reason to leave Robbie said, "I want to go to America; it's always been my goal to work in Hollywood. It's the one stage in my life where I have absolutely nothing holding me down". Robbie filmed her final scenes in October and her character left on-screen in early 2011. Robbie later revealed her character's exit was positive and that Donna departs Ramsay Street for a fashion design school in New York. Robbie said "It is very daunting for Donna at first. Ringo was the one who applied for Donna to do this course – it's like he's doing this one last thing for her." She said that Donna becomes determined to be a success and that it is her last chance to live up to Ringo's expectations of her. Robbie added that she wanted Donna to go to rehab or have a dramatic death, but she got a "boring old happy ending" instead.

Robbie reprised the role for a cameo appearance in the show's final episode, which was broadcast on 28 July 2022.

== Storylines ==
Donna comes to Charlie's to see musician Ty Harper, who is her main focus in life. Ty introduces Donna to Rachel Kinski (Caitlin Stasey) and they try to get her to leave. Ringo Brown decides to help Donna make friends. Donna helps to clear an area of the bush and when a fire breaks out, she is suspected of starting it because of her strange behaviour. Daniel Fitzgerald (Brett Tucker), a school counsellor, talks with Donna, who then decides to transfer to Erinsborough High. There she eventually becomes friends with Rachel and Bridget Parker (Eloise Mignon), and starts dating Ringo. Donna's father, Matt, bans her from seeing Ringo and she steals his car. Donna accidentally hits Nicola West (Imogen Bailey) and her dog, Bronte. However, Donna is initially unaware that she hit Nicola and she and Ringo ask Lucas Fitzgerald to fix the car. When she realises that she also hit Nicola, Donna tells Matt what happened. He tries to frame Lucas to save her, but he is caught and then goes on the run. Elle Robinson takes Donna in and becomes her legal guardian.

After she stops taking her birth-control pills, Donna believes she may be pregnant. Donna convinces Rachel and Bridget to take pregnancy tests with her. Donna's is negative, but Bridget discovers that she is pregnant. Donna's younger siblings, Simon and Tegan, arrive in Ramsay Street and their mother, Cassandra, follows not long after. Ringo and Donna break up and she becomes closer to Rachel's brother, Zeke. They share a kiss and Donna decides to leave Erinsborough to sort her head out. On her return, she gets back together with Ringo and clashes with her mother. Before Cassandra leaves town, she tells Donna that Matt is not her biological father. Donna creates an online vlog in a bid to find her father and James Linden (Tim Ross) turns up claiming to be Donna's half brother. They take a DNA test and James tells Donna that it confirms they are related. James later transfers Elle's money out of her online bank account and leaves, devastating Donna. Donna meets fashion designer Saffron Jankievicz (Shanyn Asmar) and she is offered an internship with her company. Donna skips school and neglects her friends and chores. She decides to quit and Saffron slaps her. Donna presses charges and Saffron apologises. Donna befriends Kate Ramsay (Ashleigh Brewer) following Rachel's departure and Bridget's death.

During Schoolies week Donna meets Andrew Robinson and has sex with him. Andrew turns up in Erinsborough and he and Donna eventually continue their affair. One of their trysts is accidentally recorded and Scott Griffin (Eamonn George) finds it and shows at Charlie's. Ringo is devastated and leaves for Sydney. Donna begins university and during her second lecture, Saffron turns up as a guest speaker. Saffron turns Donna's classmates against her, but Donna stands up to her. While going through her mother's diary, Donna discovers that there are two men, Nick Nixon and Nicholas McKay, who could be her biological father. She contacts them both and she gets a job in Nick Nixon's restaurant to see what he is like and she eventually tells him that she might be his daughter. They take a DNA test, which confirms that they are related. Donna tries to be nice to Ringo's new girlfriend, Naomi (Kate Bell), but she struggles. Ringo breaks up with Naomi and Donna discovers that Naomi has been following her. Naomi's trashes Donna's university project and steals her own medical file from the hospital. Donna is arrested, but Declan Napier (Erin Mullally) and Ringo find the file at Naomi's house and Donna is released.

Donna is crushed by some scaffolding after she goes to a building site to pick up Ringo. Earlier in the day, Paul had tampered with the scaffolding platform due to a feud with the site's owner. Ringo helps Donna to breathe and she is rushed to hospital, where she undergoes surgery to repair a ruptured spleen. Donna and Ringo then reunite and Ringo proposes to her. However, Donna turns him down, before proposing to him herself. Ringo wins a green card to the United States and they decide to bring the wedding forward. Donna meets Ringo's mother, Prue (Penny Cook) and she later discovers Prue and Nick together. The wedding venue has to be changed and Donna's car breaks down, so Lucas has to drive Donna and Nick to the new venue. They are stopped by the police, but Donna eventually makes it to the ceremony and she and Ringo marry. Following the honeymoon, Donna moves in with the Kennedy family. On their one-month anniversary, Ringo is knocked down by Stephanie Scully's (Carla Bonner) motorbike and dies. Donna is devastated and she struggles to accept that he has gone. Donna initially blames Kate for Ringo's death because he pushed her out of the way. Donna is upset when she misses Ringo's funeral. Donna is angry when Paul tries to use her to upset Steph at her trial. She later tells the court that Steph should not go to jail as it will not bring Ringo back. Donna receives a letter from a New York design school and Zeke tells her that Ringo applied for a place on her behalf. After initially deciding to stay in Ramsay Street, Donna's friends manage to convince her to leave by staging a fashion show showcasing her designs. Donna says her goodbyes in the street and she leaves for New York with Nick.

Eleven years later, Donna sends Toadfish Rebecchi (Ryan Moloney) a video message congratulating him on his wedding to Melanie Pearson (Lucinda Cowden).

== In other media ==
In 2009, Neighbours became the first Australian series to establish Twitter accounts for its characters. Donna was one of four characters to have an account set up, with the others being Declan, Ringo and Zeke. They began sending daily updates to their fans, giving advice and talking to each other. The updates are "complementary to the show's on-air storylines". FremantleMedia Enterprises vice-president of licensing Ben Liebmann said, "We thought it was a really great way to continue or allow the audience to engage with the Neighbours world off-screen". The messages are overseen by the Fremantle digital team, which is integrated with the story department of the Neighbours production team.

== Reception ==
Robbie earned several award nominations for her portrayal of Donna. She was nominated for Most Popular New Female Talent at the 2009 Logie Awards. She was nominated for Best Newcomer and Funniest Performance at the Inside Soap Awards and Fave Aussie Hottie at the Nickelodeon Australian Kids' Choice Awards. In 2011, Robbie received a nomination for the Logie Award for Most Popular Actress.

The character has been well received. The South Wales Evening Post called Donna "one of the programme's most popular faces" and the Bristol Evening Post said she was "one of the most refreshing Neighbours characters to come along for many a moon". Daniel Kilkelly of Digital Spy said the character had become a favourite with fans. Ruth Deller, of television website Lowculture, called Donna "fierce and fabulous". Robbie's co-star, Scott Major (Lucas Fitzgerald) praised her performance as Donna saying, "Donna could've been played in so many ways, but I think Margot nailed it, she's always fun to work with, she's a barrel of laughs and always works hard at her stuff. She's really created Donna on her own and made Donna her own character".

Website AfterEllen commented on Donna's bisexuality saying that her introduction to Neighbours was "progress". They were also happy to see that Donna had been added to the credits, meaning that she would be around for a while. Holy Soap named Donna's most memorable moments as "Stepping out with Zeke after Ringo had dumped her" and "Locking lips with Korean exchange student Sunny". In August 2010, TV Week included Donna in their "Top 25 Neighbours characters". They said "Ditzy, but kind-hearted Donna always lands herself in trouble".
