= Samantha Fitzgerald =

Fictional character in Australian TV series: Neighbours

- Neighbours character
- Portrayed by: Simone Buchanan
- Duration: 2008–2010, 2020
- First appearance: 21 March 2008
- Last appearance: 18 May 2020
- Introduced by: Ric Pellizzeri and Susan Bower (2008); Susan Bower (2010); Jason Herbison (2020)
In-universe information
- Occupation: Lawyer; Newspaper legal advisor
- Husband: Daniel Fitzgerald (2002–2008)
- Daughters: Emma Fitzgerald

Samantha "Sam" Fitzgerald is a fictional character from the Australian soap opera Neighbours, played by Simone Buchanan. She made her first screen appearance during the episode broadcast on 21 March 2008. After departing on 25 June 2008, she made a brief return on 24 November 2008. Samantha's main storylines focused on her marriage to Daniel Fitzgerald (Brett Tucker), her bipolar disorder, which was triggered by a miscarriage prior to her introduction, and a pregnancy. In June 2010, executive producer Susan Bower announced that Buchanan had reprised her role and Samantha returned on 1 November 2010. She was the lead prosecutor in Stephanie Scully's (Carla Bonner) culpable driving trial. The character departed on 24 November 2010. Buchanan reprised the role ten years later, and returned on 6 April 2020.

== Casting ==
Buchanan joined the cast of Neighbours in early 2008 in a five-month guest role capacity. She said Sam's bipolar disorder was "definitely an incentive" for her accepting the part.

== Development ==
=== Characterisation and introduction ===
Colin Vickery of the Herald Sun described Samantha as a "smart, successful lawyer". A writer for the official Neighbours website wrote that Sam is "long-suffering" and an "off-the-rails lawyer". They also called the character "fiery". Actress Kym Valentine dubbed Samantha "a beautiful, intelligent woman". Johnathon for Daytime Confidential said Sam would "go to incredible lengths to get Dan".

Samantha was introduced as the estranged wife of Daniel Fitzgerald (Brett Tucker). Tucker told Jackie Brygel of TV Week that during a meeting to discuss his character's return to the show, it was "loosely" mentioned that he could have a wife. The idea was later used. Dan initially keeps his marital status a secret until he develops feelings for Libby Kennedy (Valentine). He decides to be honest with her before their relationship goes any further. Their conversation prompts Dan to get in contact with Samantha. Tucker said, "Dan realises he has got a few things to sort out with his ex. What I can tell you is that his past involved a lot of pain and turmoil. He now knows that he has to dredge all that up again so that he can move on completely and perhaps start a new relationship with Libby." Dan has mixed emotions when Samantha then turns up Erinsborough, while Libby can see that there is still something between the two of them. Buchanan thought the Sam/Dan/Libby triangle was an interesting storyline. She explained that Samantha was unaware of Libby and "innocently comes back into the picture". Buchanan did not think either of the women were the villain in the situation.

=== Bipolar disorder ===
One of Samantha's main storylines was her battle with bipolar disorder. The storyline required careful planning as the Neighbours production team wanted to portray the issue sensitively. Buchanan worked closely with mental health charity SANE Australia to carry out the relevant research. With their help the scriptwriters, production team and Buchanan worked to portray the illness as accurately as possible. Buchanan's brother, Miles Buchanan, has bipolar disorder and is a spokesperson for the charity. He spoke of his delight that Neighbours decided to include such a storyline and praised it for being "gripping". Buchanan immediately turned to her brother when she got the role of Samantha and he helped her with her portrayal of the illness.

Buchanan herself felt that she had done the storyline justice. During an interview with the charity she stated: "I think they've done a great job, the writers really did their research beforehand; they spent time with people who have bipolar disorder, and worked closely with SANE Australia. They haven't glossed over it." Neighbours' executive producer Susan Bower said that it was important to represent the character dealing with bipolar disorder accurately. She also said that any health condition had to be "properly researched", as they did not want to give viewers any misinformation. Bower added, "In the end, proper research also helps you tell the story better than making it up".

Samantha's bipolar disorder was triggered by a miscarriage she and Dan suffered a few years prior. During their reunion, Samantha encourages Dan to work through the pain of the miscarriage. Buchanan called the plot "an absolute emotional rollercoaster" and explained that Samantha had been six months along in her pregnancy when she lost the baby. As they grieved for their child, viewers are shown how close Samantha and Dan's bond was and are given an insight into their history as a couple. Samantha plans to leave Erinsborough and let Dan get on with his life, but once they bond again, Dan does not want her to go and she decides to stay. Samantha and Dan then share a kiss and realise they still love each other.

Samantha later comes off her bipolar medication to try and get pregnant. After she fails to conceive, she lies to Dan that she is pregnant. Samantha believes that if she lies, she will have an opportunity to fall pregnant that month and no one will have to know about her lie. When Samantha becomes aware that Dan is about to find out the truth, she tells him she has suffered another miscarriage. Buchanan told Jackie Brygel of TV Week, "With each day that Samantha's off her medication, she becomes more and more paranoid about Dan's feelings for Libby. Samantha's really not thinking straight and she's going into a manic phase. Everything is falling apart around her, but it's very difficult for her to realise she's going down."

When Libby finds out about Samantha's lie, she decides that Dan needs to know the truth, as she cannot stand to see him grieving for something that never existed. She also feels that after she sacrificed their relationship, Samantha had "deliberately hurt the man she loves." Valentine told Brygel that Libby is not fully aware of how unwell Samantha is, and she is not sure whether Samantha is just being manipulative. Libby urges Dan to speak to Sam at length, but when she realises Samantha is still lying to Dan, Libby threatens to tell him the truth herself.

Writers planned a legitimate pregnancy storyline for Samantha during her next return. She uses her pregnancy to manipulate Dan and interfere in his relationship with Libby. The story is further complicated when it Samantha appears to be having a new bipolar episode. However, in a storyline twist Samantha is revealed to be faking her symptoms to gain support from Dan. Buchanan told TV Week's Brygel that Samantha "becomes the manipulator" because she really wants to get back together with Dan. Buchanan added that Samantha "does turn quite nasty. We're really seeing a completely different side to her now." Buchanan also defended Samantha because she truly believes her baby will need their father to be present. She did acknowledge that Samantha is "just not too fussed about where that leaves Dan's relationship with Libby." Writers included another surprise element when Dan announces his intention to fight for custody of their unborn child. Dan originally tells Samantha she could still have access to the child but Samantha objects to the idea of her child living with Libby. Samantha then vows to fight Dan for custody of their child.

=== Returns (2010, 2020) ===
In 2010, Neighbours executive producer, Susan Bower, revealed that Buchanan would be reprising her role of Samantha. Speaking of the reasons behind her return Bower stated: "I like if we are going to have returning characters that they're part of the story. They don't just walk in and say 'G'day' and walk out again." The Herald Sun reported that Buchanan would be returning for a four-week guest role. Bower later said that there is "plenty in store" for the character. She added "Hang onto your hats, Samantha is back and I know Simone will love what we have planned". Sam returned to Neighbours on 1 November 2010.

Samantha was the prosecutor in Stephanie Scully's (Carla Bonner) culpable driving court case. Samantha is determined to see Steph sent to jail and she forms an alliance with Paul Robinson (Stefan Dennis). Buchanan said "Samantha comes back to Erinsborough with her lawyer's hat well and truly on. She mentions that she's now well again – her bipolar disorder is under control. She also talks about Dan and the fact that she's seen him and the baby." Buchanan also said that Sam has a personal agenda as well as a professional one, she is unhappy that Steph fell pregnant with Dan's child. Sam also wants to get back at Libby Kennedy (Kym Valentine). Samantha and Paul join up because Paul wants justice for Donna Freedman (Margot Robbie), whose husband Steph killed. Dennis said Samantha is "as devious as Paul is" and he sees that Samantha is a way to get his wish for Steph to be punished. Buchanan added that she surprised to be asked back because she thought her character had "burnt her bridges with most people in Ramsay Street the last time around." Bower revealed that viewers can see that Samantha has a score to settle with Steph and Libby and her questions open up a lot of wounds for Steph. Bower added that that issue has "divided many fans."

On 23 March 2020, Daniel Kilkelly of Digital Spy reported that Buchanan had reprised the role again, and would appear in April 2020. Samantha is hired by Claudia Watkins (Kate Raison) in her custody battle with Elly Conway (Jodi Anasta).

== Storylines ==
When Dan returns to Erinsborough, he is attracted to Libby and gets in contact with Samantha to ask for a divorce. Samantha arrives in Ramsay Street hoping that Dan wants a reconciliation. Dan explains that he wants a divorce, so that he can start a relationship with Libby. Samantha is shocked, but their conversation is interrupted by Rosetta Cammeniti (Natalie Saleeba) who Samantha went to university with. After realising that she is losing Dan, Samantha decides to stay for a while and is offered work with Rosetta's law firm. Samantha refuses to disclose details about her bipolar disorder to anyone else, but she is angry when she realises that Dan had told Libby. When Libby visits Samantha for some legal advice she tells her that there is nothing between her and Dan and Samantha and Libby begin a friendship. Samantha and Dan talk about the baby she miscarried. Samantha also helps find Libby's son, Ben Kirk (Blake O'Leary), who had become trapped in a drain. Samantha announces that she is planning to leave, but she stays to organise a baby shower for Rosetta. When Rosetta is told that she had had a false pregnancy, she remains convinced that she is pregnant and Samantha tells Rosetta that she believes her. Dan later decides to give his marriage with Samantha another try.

Samantha decides to try for another baby and stops taking her medication, so she can get pregnant. Samantha does not tell Dan about her plans, but her symptoms begin to show and she tells Dan that she wants a child with him. When Libby spots Samantha with a pregnancy test, Samantha lies that she is pregnant and Dan is delighted. Samantha's behaviour continues to get worse and she goes to Charlie's and gets drunk. She later decides to go to a hotel with Oliver Barnes (David Hoflin) and announces that her marriage is over. Dan calls the crisis assessment team and Samantha admits that she is not pregnant and lies that she had miscarried again. After making Dan promise he would not leave, Samantha tells him the truth. Samantha is admitted to hospital and is put back on her medication. She then asks Dan to move to New Zealand with her and Dan agrees to go. At the airport, Samantha realises that she is always going to be second best to Libby and leaves alone. Dan returns home to find Samantha had signed the divorce papers.

Six months later, a heavily pregnant Samantha returns to Erinsborough in the middle of Dan and Libby's joint hen and buck's night. Samantha claims not to know about the wedding and tells Dan that he is about to become a father. Elle Robinson (Pippa Black) offers Samantha a room at her house and Libby tries to be nice by inviting her to a barbecue. When Libby sees Dan feel the baby kick, she calls off the wedding. It later emerges that Lucas Fitzgerald (Scott Major) had told Samantha about the wedding. Samantha asks Paul Robinson (Stefan Dennis) for a job and he employs her as a legal adviser for his newspaper. When Libby turns up at Samantha's ultrasound scan, Samantha tells Dan that she does not want Libby involved with her baby. Cassandra Freedman (Tottie Goldsmith) moves into Ramsay Street and when she sets her sights on Paul, she sees Samantha as a threat. Cassandra gets a job at the hospital and she reads Samantha's file and decides to blackmail her about her bipolar disorder. Samantha finds out that her baby was conceived three weeks later than she had thought and therefore is not Dan's. Cassandra begins her blackmail plan and Samantha blurts out that she had not known that Dan was not the father of the baby. Cassandra gets Samantha to convince her daughter, Donna (Margot Robbie), to move out of the Robinsons' house. As Samantha and Cassandra are discussing her secret, Stephanie Scully (Carla Bonner) overhears and tells Libby and Dan the truth about Samantha's baby. Dan confronts Samantha and she tells him that the baby is not his. Samantha then leaves Erinsborough.

Samantha later calls Dan, while suffering a manic episode and asks him to look after her and her newborn daughter, Emma. Dan agrees and he and Libby go to New Zealand. Libby returns alone as Dan agrees to stay for another week. Libby discovers Dan has transferred $12,000 of their money into Samantha's bank account, to help with her debts. On Dan's return, Libby makes him promise not to have any further contact with Samantha.

A year later, when Charlie Hoyland (Jacob Brito) wanders off during Halloween, Samantha finds him and runs into Steph, Lucas and Lyn Scully (Janet Andrewartha). Lucas and Samantha talk and she tells him that she is good. Steph thanks Samantha for finding Charlie and Samantha tells her that she has been to see Dan and Adam. Lyn asks Samantha what brings her back to town and Samantha tells her that she is there to prosecute Steph's culpable driving case. The next day, Samantha goes to see Donna and says that she is sorry that her husband, Ringo Brown (Sam Clark), is dead. Samantha asks Donna if they can meet, but Donna turns her down. Samantha later sees Donna's university lecturer fail her assignment and asks if she can buy her and Kate Ramsay (Ashleigh Brewer) tea. Samantha talks to Kate about her witness statement and when she goes to Ramsay Street to talk to Paul, she sees Libby. Samantha tells Karl (Alan Fletcher) and Susan Kennedy (Jackie Woodburne) that she has recently lost her father and that she is sorry for what she did to them. Lucas then asks her to leave everyone alone. Libby warns Sam to stay away from her parents and Samantha tells her that Dan is a new man now he is a father. Steph takes her away and tells her to back off. Samantha later gives Steph some leaflets about children in prison. Toadie tells Samantha that he will report her to the police and bar association for witness intimidation. Paul meets her in Charlie's and tells her that he wants to help Samantha out and he will give her anything she wants. Samantha later tells Paul that he needs to get Donna to attend the trial to upset Steph. However, Donna later realises what Paul is doing. Samantha asks Karl and Susan to write victim impact statements and when she notices something is up between the couple, she talks to Susan and tells her that she will find out if something is wrong. When Libby is on the stand, Sam brings up Steph's relationship with Dan. Samantha then launches a personal attack on Libby and Judge Willow (Jane Clifton) tells her to stop. The jury later deliver a guilty verdict. Donna has a go at Samantha and says that the case was never about Ringo, but a chance for her to get back at Libby and Steph. The judge later gives Steph a six-year prison sentence.

Ten years later, Samantha meets with Claudia Watkins, who wants custody of her granddaughter Aster Conway (Scout Bowman). Claudia tells Sam that Aster's mother, Elly Conway is unemployed and about to face trial for murder. Sam is happy to take on the case, as Elly is Susan Kennedy's niece. Sam explains her history with the Kennedys and how she believes that they exploited her mental health issues, prompting her departure from Melbourne. Sam later returned to the city and is now a partner in a law firm. When Claudia asks who will care for Aster if Elly goes to jail, Sam replies that it will mostly likely be the Kennedys and Elly's sister. Sam then tells Claudia that they need to cast doubt on their suitability. Sam and Claudia assist Angela Lane (Amanda Harrison) in her campaign to persuade Susan to resign from her principal's job. Sam provides Claudia with material to blackmail Judge Joseph Vagg (Rick Burchall), who is presiding over Elly's sentencing hearing, into giving Elly a three-year prison sentence. When Elly chooses to take Aster with her to prison, they also pay Andrea Somers (Madeleine West) to cause a riot, convincing Elly to give Aster back to her sister Bea Nilsson (Bonnie Anderson), Karl and Susan. After Claudia witnesses Susan berate Mackenzie Hargreaves (Georgie Stone), she calls for an emergency meeting to gain an interim parenting order. Sam argues that Claudia can care for Aster full-time, offering routine and stability. With Sam's help, Claudia underhandedly casts doubt on Karl and Susan's suitability to care for Aster, and after failing to come to an agreement, the judge awards custody to Claudia and visitation rights to the Kennedys and Bea, on the condition that Claudia regularly takes Aster to visit Elly.

Claudia is later arrested after Susan, Bea and several other Ramsay Street residents discover she was responsible for the fire which destroyed the physical evidence in Finn's case. She refuses to confess to any crime until Samantha arrives. However, Samantha dismisses Claudia as a client because she failed to flee the country after realising she had been caught. As she leaves the police station, Toadie confronts Samantha about her blackmailing Elly's judge. She denies this will get her into trouble with the law, and warns Toadie that she may take him to court if he continues to dig for information about her in the future.

== Reception ==
During Samantha's first appearance a critic for the Daily Record called her a "blonde beauty." A year later, another critic for the newspaper stated: "We know we're supposed to feel sorry for people who are ill, but can somebody just tell Dan's ex-wife Sam to get knotted?" They also said that they had "high hopes" that Samantha was gone for good, but she had turned up again "like the proverbial bad penny." In 2010, television critic Andrew Mercado praised Buchanan's 2009 appearance, saying "Simone Buchanan did a great turn last year on Neighbours as a crazed ex". Of her subsequent return, Cameron Adams of the Herald Sun wrote "When Simone Buchanan is back in Ramsay Street you know she's going to bring all manner of drama courtesy of her slightly unhinged character Sam." While observing the moment when Sam tells Libby that Dan is happy with the baby Libby could not give him, Adams commented "Charming." Adams' colleague Siobhan Duck later commented that Buchanan had received critical acclaim for her portrayal of Sam.
