= Women in Prison (TV series) =

American television sitcom

- Genre: Sitcom
- Created by: Katherine Green; Michael G. Moye; Ron Leavitt
- Directed by: Gerren Keith; Phil Ramuno; John Sgueglia; Linda Day; Shelley Jensen
- Starring: Julia Campbell; Blake Clark; C. C. H. Pounder; Peggy Cass; Antoinette Byron; Denny Dillon; Wendie Jo Sperber
- Opening theme: "Women in Prison" by Ray Colcord and Phyllis Katz
- Composer: Ray Colcord
- Country of origin: United States
- Original language: English
- No. of seasons: 1
- No. of episodes: 13

Production
- Running time: 22 minutes
- Production companies: Embassy Communications (1987); ELP Communications (1988); Columbia Pictures Television (1988)

Original release
- Network: Fox
- Release: October 11, 1987 – February 20, 1988

Women in Prison is an American television sitcom created by Katherine Green which aired on Fox from October 11, 1987 to February 20, 1988.

== Synopsis ==
Set in cell-block J of the Bass Women's prison in Wisconsin, the show focuses on the interactions among the prison inmates. The show's cast include Peggy Cass, Julia Campbell, Antoinette Byron, Blake Clark, Denny Dillon, C. C. H. Pounder, and Wendie Jo Sperber.

Campbell stars as Vicki Springer, an overachieving yuppie, who was brought to Bass Women's Prison for supposedly shoplifting (she had been actually framed on the charge by her scheming no-good husband), where she had to deal with the inmates. Eve Shipley (Cass) was the old lady prisoner, having been there for almost 10 years and was kind of the old hand prisoner, helping others get used to the routine; Dawn Murphy (Pounder) was a bad tempered African-American woman who had murdered her abusive husband; and Bonnie Harper (Byron) was in for prostitution.

Vickie, Eve, Dawn and Bonnie all shared a cell, while, in a nearby cell of her own, complete with computer access, was Pam (Sperber), who was, not surprisingly, in prison for computer fraud. They all had to contend with guard Meg Bando (Dillon), who didn't like the prisoners, and vice versa, and the assistant warden, Clint Rafferty (Clark), for whom Vicki worked as a secretary (for her prison job) and to whom he was attracted.

Only thirteen episodes of the series were produced and aired.

== Cast ==
- Julia Campbell as Vicki Springer
- Blake Clark as Clint Rafferty
- C. C. H. Pounder as Dawn Murphy
- Peggy Cass as Eve Shipley
- Antoinette Byron as Bonnie Harper
- Denny Dillon as Meg Bando
- Wendie Jo Sperber as Pam

== Episodes ==
No.	Title	Directed by	Written by	Original release date
1	"Vickie Does Prison"	Phil Ramuno	Katherine Green	October 11, 1987
Vickie arrives at Bass Woman's Prison, and immediately makes the other prisoners jealous by getting a coveted job.
2	"Goldfingers"	Gerren Keith	Rob LaZebnik & David Sacks	October 24, 1987
Eve hopes she can join the prison's forestry detail when she finds out they'll be working where she has gold hidden.
3	"Hello, I Must Be Going"	Phil Ramuno	Katherine Green & Richard Gurman	October 31, 1987
Vicki's husband turns to bribery to try to secure her freedom. Meanwhile, Dawn finds she's earned the wrath of the nastiest prisoner in the joint.
4	"Nell's Bells"	Linda Day	Eric Gilliland	November 7, 1987
The assistant warden won't allow Vicki to memorialize Dawn's cousin.
5	"Walk This Way"	Dick Martin	Ron Leavitt & Lissa Levin	November 14, 1987
Pam has a plan to escape the prison, but Vicki is hesitant to lend her support.
6	"Skirts on Ice"	Tony Singletary	Irene Mecchi	November 21, 1987
The prisoners take well to Vicki's claim that the new heaters she's been campaigning for will soon arrive.
7	"The Hole Story"	Unknown	Katherine Green	December 5, 1987
Five days in solitary confinement leads to Vicki experiencing hallucinations.
8	"Veni, Vidi, Vicki"	Unknown	Kevin Kelton	December 26, 1987
Vicki wonders if her looks are fading when a new male guard with a Don Juan reputation seems uninterested in her.
9	"Prisoners of Love"	Shelley Jensen	John Swartzwelder	January 16, 1988
Eve's husband smuggles himself into Bass Women's Prison to celebrate their 30th anniversary.
10	"52 Pick Up"	Gerren Keith	Story by : Richard Gurman & Micki Raton; Teleplay by : Kevin Kelton	January 23, 1988
A lucky streak at poker leads to Dawn and Vicki's gambling addiction.
11	"One Hero with Relish"	John Sgueglia	Eric Gilliland	February 6, 1988
Meg steals Vicki's thunder by falsely claiming that she was the one to use CPR to save Assistant Warden Rafferty.
12	"I Do, I Don't"	John Sgueglia	Irene Mecchi	February 13, 1988
A marriage proposal from a former john sees Bonnie imagining being a housewife instead of a prostitute.
13	"The Triangle"	Gerren Keith	Rob LaZebnik & David Sacks	February 20, 1988
When Vicki pleads with the assistant warden to be nicer to a heartbroken Meg, the following morning it seems he may have gone beyond simple kindness.

== See also ==
- Birds of a Feather (1989)
- Orange Is the New Black (2013)
- Pink Is In (2021)
- Porridge (1974)
- Willow B: Women in Prison (1980)
