= Antoinette Byron =

Australian actress

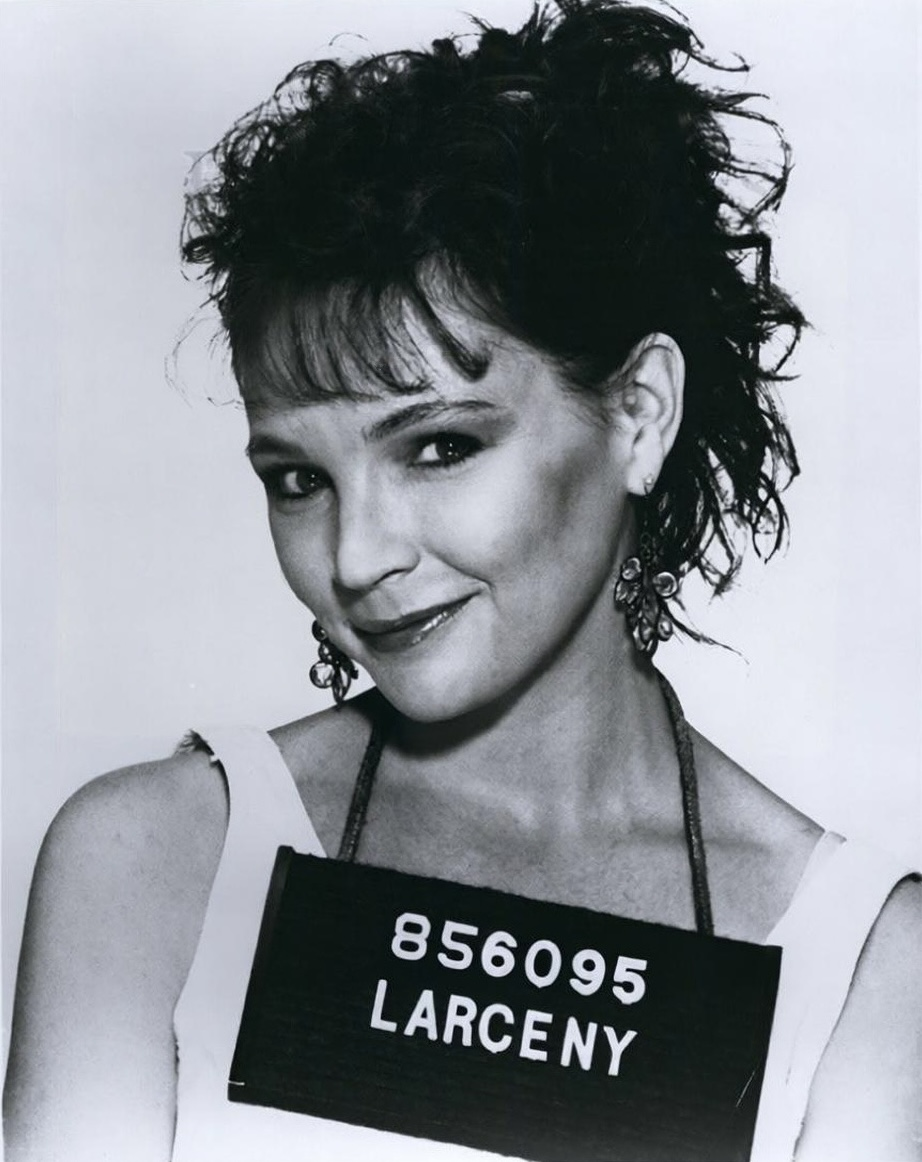
- Byron in Women in Prison, 1987
- Born: 1961 or 1962 (age 63–64); Australia
- Education: National Institute of Dramatic Art
- Occupations: Actress; teacher; public speaking coach
- Years active: 1977–2005 (actress)
- Known for: The Henderson Kids; All My Children; Skirts; Home and Away

Antoinette Byron (Note: Not to be confused with an actress called Antoinette Byron from Canberra, who performed in La Boheme and was awarded a scholarship in 1978, aged 19 (hence born 1958 or 1959), and was about to go to Flinders University in Adelaide.) (born 1961 or 1962) is an Australian actress and acting coach who is best known for playing Natalie Nash on the Australian soap opera Home and Away, and a constable in the police drama Skirts.

== Early life and education ==
Antoinette Byron was born in 1961 or 1962.

She made her TV debut in the Australian soap opera The Restless Years as Tracey Williams in 1977.

She studied at the National Institute of Dramatic Art (NIDA) in Sydney, but did not complete the three-year certificate course.

== Career ==
Byron started her acting career aged 19, when she left NIDA to accept the role of Janet in the 1981 version of the stage musical The Rocky Horror Show.

She played roles in series such as Bellamy (1981), Scales of Justice, Special Squad, The Henderson Kids and in soap operas such as Prisoner (1982), Starting Out, and Neighbours (1985). She later portrayed the first Skye Chandler on the soap opera All My Children from 1986 to 1987 before been replaced by Robin Christopher. Byron then took a main role on the Fox short-lived sitcom Women in Prison.

Byron was cast in the role of Natalie Nash on the Australian soap opera Home and Away, taking over from original actress Angelica la Bozzetta, debuting in the 1999 season premiere. She later appeared in police drama Skirts, Jake and the Fatman, E Street, Time Trax, Melrose Place, Savannah, Baywatch, High Tide, Pacific Palisades, and Malcolm in the Middle.

She has also appeared in TV movies such as Skin Deep, Crime of the Decade and theatrical films including Fast Talking, Rebel, Death of a SoldierSkirts (TV series) and Man with the Screaming Brain.

As of 2024 Byron teaches and coaches other actors and performers, and coaches people in public speaking skills.

== Filmography ==
=== Film ===
Year	Title	Role	Type
1984	Fast Talking	Cashier	Feature film
1984	Skin Deep	Christina Sorensson	TV movie
1985	Crime of the Decade		TV movie
1985	Rebel	Member of All Girl Band	Feature film
1986	Death of a Soldier	Police Office Clerk 2	Feature film
1990	The Phantom Horseman	Arabella	Feature film
2005	Man with the Screaming Brain	Jackie Cole	Feature film
2005	American Black Beauty	Anna	TV movie

=== Television ===
Year	Title	Role	Notes
1977	The Restless Years	Tracey Williams	TV series
1981	Bellamy	Valerie	TV series, episode 6: "A Nice Girl Like You"
1982	Prisoner	Amanda Cole	TV series, season 4, 3 episodes
1983	Scales of Justice	Prostitute	TV miniseries, episode 3: "The Numbers"
1983	Starting Out	Laurel Adams	TV series, 85 episodes
1984	Special Squad	Jasmine	TV series, episode 12: "The Golden Run"
1985	Neighbours	Lorraine Kingham	TV series, 5 episodes
1985	The Henderson Kids	Pat Edwards	TV series, 22 episodes
1986–87	All My Children	Skye Chandler	TV series, 8 episodes
1987–88	Women in Prison	Bonnie Harper	TV series, 13 episodes
1990–91	Skirts	Constable Tina Van Hervell	TV series, 39 episodes
1991	Jake and the Fatman	Vanessa Kruger	TV series, season 4, episode 12: "I May Be Wrong"
1992–93	E Street	Laura Fielding	TV series, 44 episodes
1994	Time Trax	Female Fugitive	TV series, season 2, episode 12: "Almost Human"
1995	Melrose Place	Emily Baldwin	TV series, season 3, 2 episodes
1996	Savannah	Property Official	TV series, season 1, episode 4: "The Importance of Being"
1996	Baywatch	Dr Johnson	TV series, season 6, episode 22: "Go for the Gold"
1997	High Tide	Veronica	TV series, season 3, episode 19: "Desperate Friday"
1997	Pacific Palisades	Hobson’s Daughter	TV series, season 1, episode 5: "Mothers and Other Strangers"
1999–2000	Home and Away	Natalie Nash	TV series, 57 episodes
2001	Malcolm in the Middle	Lillian	TV series, season 3, episode 3: "Book Club"

== Theatre ==
Year	Title	Role	Notes
1979	Interview		UNSW NIDA Studio
1981–1982	The Rocky Horror Show	Janet	Opera Theatre, Adelaide, and multiple other venues
?	Macbeth		Edinburgh Theatre Festival (?) (Note: This is per Antoinette Byron's website - no independent corroboration of either play in Edinburgh, and no such festival - there is Edinburgh Festival, Edinburgh Fringe, and a venue called Edinburgh Festival Theatre.) Scotland
?	Mary, Queen of Scots		Edinburgh Theatre Festival (?), Scotland
