= Skirts (TV series) =

- Genre: Police Drama
- Directed by: Brendan Maher; Richard Sarell (8 episodes); Ian Gilmour
- Starring: Tracy Mann; Antoinette Byron; Mary Coustas; Karen Davitt; Kate Gillick; Nicholas Bell; Ben Mitchell; Sally-Anne Upton; Alasdair Saksena; Tony Seguin
- Composer: David Hirschfelder
- Country of origin: Australia
- Original language: English
- No. of seasons: 3
- No. of episodes: 39 + 1 Feature Film

Production
- Executive producer: Roger Simpson
- Producer: Roger Le Mesurier
- Production locations: Melbourne, Victoria, Australia
- Running time: 60 minutes
- Production company: Simpson Le Mesurier

Original release
- Network: Seven Network
- Release: 18 April – 27 September 1990

Related
- Blue Heelers

Skirts is an Australian television police drama broadcast on the Seven Network in 1990. Skirts was produced by Roger Le Mesurier and Roger Simpson. It was directed by Brendan Maher, Richard Sarell and Ian Gilmour. 40 episodes were produced over 3 seasons in 1990 and the series screened between April and September 1990. The last episode aired was season 2, episode 12. The final 14 episodes were never aired by the Seven Network.

== Cast ==
=== Main ===
| Actor/actress | Character | Rank | Episodes |
|---|---|---|---|
| Nicholas Bell | Gary Block | Sergeant (Squad Boss) | Pilot, 01–39 |
| Tracy Mann | Pauline Reardon | Sergeant (Squad Leader) | Pilot, 01–39 |
| Mary Coustas | Julie Makris | Constable | Pilot, 01–39 |
| Karen Davitt | Debbie Priest | Constable | Pilot, 01–39 |
| Ben Mitchell | Bevan "Beverley" Quin | Constable | Pilot, 01–39 |
| Antoinette Byron | Tina Van Hervell | Constable | 05–39 |
| Kate Gillick | Wanda Nowacek | Constable | Pilot, 01–25 (Episode 31 guest) |
| Sally-Anne Upton | Jenny Kruger | Senior Constable | 26–39 (Episodes never aired) |

=== Recurring/semi-regular & guests ===
| Actor | Character | Role | Episodes |
|---|---|---|---|
| Alice Garner | Hanna White | | |
| Alison Whyte | Natalie | | 1 episode |
| Anne Phelan | Mrs Donovan | | |
| Daniel Pollock | | | |
| Debra Lawrence | | | 1 episode |
| Francisco Antonio Seguin (credited as Tony Seguin) | Tex | Welfare Worker | Pilot episode |
| Gary Sweet | Tom Waters | Pauline Reardon's Boyfriend | Pilot episode & episodes 1–3 |
| Greg Stone | Mr Morgan | | 1 episode |
| John Flaus | Father Naiman | | 1 episode |
| Lynne McGranger | Dot | | 1 episode |
| Marilynne Paspaley | Ms McIndoe | | 1 episode |
| Nicki Paull | | | 1 episode |
| Nicola Quilter | Louise | | 1 episode |
| Olivia Hamnett | Kate | | 1 episode |
| Peter Hosking | Campbell | | 1 episode |
| Reg Evans | Fish | | 1 episode |
| Richard Morgan | Burrell | | 1 episode |
| Ross Newton | Dipp | | 1 episode |
| Sheryl Munks | Mrs Williams | | 1 episode |
| Simon Palomares | Brad | | |
| Sue Jones | Joan | Senior Sergeant (Squad Boss) | Pilot episode |
| Tim Robertson | Harrison | | 1 episode |
| Tiriel Mora | Jimmy | | 1 episode |

== Production ==
Production on the pilot episode began in June 1989 in Melbourne, Victoria and it was delivered to the Seven Network by August the same year.

Skirts first aired on Wednesday 18 April 1990 with a pilot feature length episode and the first official episode was broadcast on Sunday 22 April 1990 on Channel 7.

Selected episodes of Skirts were again broadcast in 1993 on the Seven Network in a late night time slot in the hope by producer and creator Roger Simpson that the series might be revived.

== Series overview ==
| Season | Episodes | First aired | Last aired |
|---|---|---|---|
| 1 | 13 | 22 April 1990 | 15 July 1990 |
| 2 | 13 (Episode 13 never aired) | 9 August 1990 | 25 August 1990 |
| 3 | 13 | Unaired | Unaired |

== Episode list ==
=== Pilot ===
| No. overall | No. in season | Title | Directed by | Written by | Original release date |
|---|---|---|---|---|---|
| 0 | 0 | "Skirts" | Brendan Maher | Roger Le Mesurier | 18 April 1990 |
Senior Constable Pauline Reardon is faced with a dilemma when the man she loves is arrested by the CIB in very suspicious circumstances.

=== Season 1 (1990) ===
| No. overall | No. in season | Title | Directed by | Written by | Original release date |
|---|---|---|---|---|---|
| 1 | 1 | "Consequences" | Brendan Haher | Roger Simpson | 22 April 1990 |
Wanda is devastated and humiliated when her gun disappears. It is recovered through a series of strange and unexpected turn of events, but not before Wanda seriously contemplates leaving the force. Bev can't win when he comes up against a lady who won't hesitate to employ extreme measures when faced with arrest.
| 2 | 2 | "Odyssey" | Brendan Haher | Roger Simpson | 29 April 1990 |
Julie's emotional involvement with an angry Greek boy leads her to suspect him of a horrific crime. Pauline's hopes for a time of smooth sailing in her relationship with Tom are once again shattered.
| 3 | 3 | "Making The Break" | Richard Sarell | Mac Gudgeon | 6 May 1990 |
The course of true love runs far from smooth for Pauline. Bev, emotionally involved in a young Filipino boy's case, almost loses it when faced with the perpetrator. The simple task of locating a truant husband ends up in headaches for all.
| 4 | 4 | "The Name of the Game" | Brendan Haher | Sheila Sibley | 13 May 1990 |
Wanda and Debbie go undercover as a couple of street girls to try and catch an offender who is terrorising prostitutes while Pauline helps an old lady who is nowhere near as vague as she seems.
| 5 | 5 | "Bring in the toe-cutters" | Brendan Haher | Graham Hartley | 20 May 1990 |
Julie works on breaking through a tough highschool girl's veneer, offering her a chance to escape her criminal background. When Block receives a bribe, he doesn't realise the devastating results he will achieve by investigating its source.
| 6 | 6 | "Keepers of the Door" | Unknown | Unknown | 27 May 1990 |
The stress of the job bubbles to the surface when Debbie attends a road accident. Bev and Julie help out another young mother before she becomes another streetkid statistic. When a couple of derros take over the Salvation Army Home, Pauline and Tina reverse the situation with a couple of clever tricks.
| 7 | 7 | "The Wrong Impression" | Unknown | Unknown | 3 June 1990 |
Pauline and Block lock horns over the best way to handle a traumatised assault victim. Wanda rethinks her strategy in her bid to win gold in the Women's Shotput Finals. When the prison van is out of action, Tina has a chance to prove she is more than just a pretty face. Guest Appearance Debra Lawrance
| 8 | 8 | "The Cowboy and the Pin-Up" | Unknown | Unknown | 10 June 1990 |
Tina rocks the station when a scandal rag prints a picture of her in a cheeky pin-up pose. Julie gets emotionally involved with a derelict who forgets what he has come to confess.
| 9 | 9 | "Where The Heart Is" | Unknown | Judy Colguhoun | 17 June 1990 |
Julie, disillusioned by a hard-hitting tragedy, is in danger of being seduced from the Force by a tempting proposition. Wanda locks horns with a boy in a bid to keep him out of an institution. Tina offers to distract Pauline's unwanted secret admirer.
| 10 | 10 | "Happy Families" | Ian Gilmour | Michael Joshua Barbara Bishop Mary Dagmar Davies | 24 June 1990 |
When the police intervene in a disturbed schoolboy's home life, the precarious situation explodes. Rumours run rife when a positive pregnancy testing kit is found in the locker room. A witch, determined to perform an exorcism at City North, proves difficult to remove. Guest Appearance Peter Hosking and Olivia Hamnett
| 11 | 11 | "Mist Green" | Unknown | Unknown | 1 July 1990 |
Debbie is racked with fear over the possibility of having contracted AIDS from a crash victim. Block is dubious about the reliability of a witness who seems to have fallen under the offender's spell. Bev unravels the mystery of a drunk yuppie who refuses to reveal his identity.
| 12 | 12 | "Means and Ends" | Unknown | Unknown | 8 July 1990 |
Unexpected passions are aroused at City North when the police are asked to vote on their right to strike. Arresting and holding a group of protesters overnight stretches the police's resources and patience to the limits.
| 13 | 13 | "Goblins" | Unknown | Unknown | 15 July 1990 |
Julie has to overcome her phobia in order to give a very sick friend the strength to make the decision which will put her on the long road to recovery. Block and Bed fight a wave of racism which is forcing an elderly true blue Aussie off his premises.

=== Season 2 (1990) ===
| No. overall | No. in season | Title | Directed by | Written by | Original release date |
|---|---|---|---|---|---|
| 14 | 1 | "Intimate Relations" | Brendan Maher | Cliff Green | 9 August 1990 |
When a Turkish woman, Djameela, arrives in Australia to find her sponsors have withdrawn their sponsorship, only Wanda and Julie's intervention can save her from deportation. Block's aunt reveals what's really going on at a "Special Accommodation House", and a fiasco involving two "rough diamonds" and one stolen car lands Debbie in a date with a difference.
| 15 | 2 | "Winning A Heart" | Richard Sarell | Bill Garner | 16 August 1990 |
When Pauline babysits a close friend's little girl, Block forces her to face a grim reality. Bev is racked with guilt when he has to put an offender, who will almost certainly be assaulted, behind bars.
| 16 | 3 | "Wolf Whistles" | Ian Gilmour | Chris Roache | 23 August 1990 |
Pauline, Debbie and Wanda attempt to change the behaviour of a gang of abuseive and sexist workmen. Tina counsels a girl to take legal action against her mother and Julie becomes increasingly unnerved when she is plagued by an anonymous admirer. Guest Appearance Paula Duncan
| 17 | 4 | "Future Imperfect" | Brendan Maher | Graham Hartley | 30 August 1990 |
When a young woman suffers amnesia, Julie takes her through the painful steps of discovering who she is. When Wanda and Debbie make a decision without referring the case to Community Welfare, tempers explode.
| 18 | 5 | "When The Chemistry Is Right" | Richard Sarell | Vincent Gil | 6 September 1990 |
An accidental chemical spill escalates into a major emergency which stretches the police's emotional and physical resources to the limit.
| 19 | 6 | "Parents Ain't What They Used To Be" | Ian Gilmour | Susan Hore | 13 September 1990 |
Julie feels increasingly smothered when a bereaved woman is obsessed with mothering her. When a shop owner takes the law into his own hands, the consequences are devastating. Guest Appearance Gerda Nicholson
| 20 | 7 | "A Family Matter" | Brendan Maher | Linda Aronson | 20 September 1990 |
Tina senses a young girl's outbursts are more than typical teenage rebellion. "The War of the Vegie Patch" wins Wanda a handsome and hunksome admirer while Block has a win against the bureaucrats
| 21 | 8 | "Hard Rain's Gonna Fall" | Richard Sarell | Craig Wilkins | 27 September 1990 |
Tina's involvement with a heroic handicapped man dissolves into disaster. Snakes, coffins, black eyeliner and The Masons, a family dispute proves to be trying for Pauline. Is Debbie's engagement to the man of her dreams a big mistake?
| 22 | 9 | "Three-Ring Circus" | Ian Gilmour | Mac Gudgeon | 1990* |
Pauline helps a young women (Lane) give birth to her first baby. Meanwhile Julie is having the problems coping with the aftermath of responding to very day police matters.
| 23 | 10 | "Extreme Prejudice Part 1" | Brendan Maher | Roger Simpson | 18 October 1990* |
A twice convicted child kidnapper is released from jail and Wanda faces every cop's nightmare when innocent lives are in the balance and she is the one behind the trigger.
| 24 | 11 | "Extreme Prejudice Part 2" | Richard Sarell | Roger Simpson | 25 October 1990* |
Wanda suffers deeply following a shooting incident at a Day Care Centre. Observing the pressure she is under, Block is faced with a hard decision: should Wanda be allowed to continue her duties or be put out on stress.
| 25 | 12 | "Raw Recruits" | Ian Gilmour | Graham Hartley & Chris Roache | 1990* |
A couple of "raw recruits" keep City North on its toes while Bev inadvertently experiences a drug-induced "trip". Pauline and Block keep a midnight rendezvous with a drug dealer which reaps some sobering results
| 26 | 13 | "Friends And Other Strangers" | N/A | N/A | Unaired |
When Tina arrives with a face discoloured by bruises, she feeds Block a series of fabrications which he doesn't believe. Move over Crocodile Dundee - Senior Constable Kroger's reporting for duty at City North!

- Aired on HSV7 in Victoria Only.

=== Season 3 (not confirmed as broadcast) ===
Due to low ratings of the previous episodes, it is believed that Channel 7 decided not to air any episodes from the 3rd season. However there is nothing to confirm whether it was or wasn't broadcast.

| No. overall | No. in season | Title | Directed by | Written by | Original release date |
|---|---|---|---|---|---|
| 27 | 1 | "Rats" | Richard Sarell | Susan Hore | Unaired |
Tina discovers firsthand how a victim of crime really feals. Bev and Kroger are involved in a heated search for a cage of stolen rats who, if not found, are doomed to a painful death
| 28 | 2 | "An Accident Waiting To Happen" | Ian Gillmour | Debra Oswald | Unaired |
Pauline is concerned for a teenager who is into drinking and harmless pranks. He is due to sit for his licence and she senses a potentially tragic accident just waiting to happen. Debbie and Kroger try to unearth a mystery woman's motive for following a man day and night.
| 29 | 3 | "Sons And Lovers" | Brendan Maher | John Hugginson | Unaired |
The police help a girl rattled by obscene phone calls. All are convinced the caller is her ex-boyfriend, but after a frightening confrontation, Tina starts to think again. Pauline and Kroger grapple with a thirteen year old "hardened crim" obsessed with pursuing a life of crime.
| 30 | 4 | "Needle in a Haystack" | Richard Sarell | Cheryl Steff & Graham Hartley | Unaired |
Bev is the lifeline between a three-year old girl and the police in a desperate bid to avert a potential tragedy. When a recently bereaved woman takes an overdose of pills, Kroger and Julie are faced with a dilemma: was it an accident, or a suicide attempt - and will it happen again?
| 31 | 5 | "Vigilante" | Ian Gilmour | Debra Oswald | Unaired |
A concerned Pauline tries to defuse an inevitable explosion when a couple of crusading mothers stir up the seamy drug world. A university graduate investigates the police's methods of dealing with the General.
| 32 | 6 | "Cops And Robbers" | Brendan Maher | John Hugginson | Unaired |
Sadness at City North as the officers attend the funeral of a colleague gunned down in an ambush. Paranoia is running high with a tip-off of a bomb planted in the station. Guest Appearance Anne Phelan
| 33 | 7 | TBA | N/A | N/A | Unaired |
...
| 34 | 8 | TBA | N/A | N/A | Unaired |
...
| 35 | 9 | TBA | N/A | N/A | Unaired |
...
| 36 | 10 | TBA | N/A | N/A | Unaired |
...
| 37 | 11 | TBA | N/A | N/A | Unaired |
...
| 38 | 12 | TBA | N/A | N/A | Unaired |
...
| 39 | 13 | TBA | N/A | N/A | Unaired |
...

== See also ==
- List of Australian television series
- List of Seven Network programs
