= Man with the Screaming Brain =

2005 science-fiction comedy film

- Theatrical release poster
- Directed by: Bruce Campbell
- Written by: Bruce Campbell
- Story by: Bruce Campbell; David Goodman; Sam Raimi (as R.O.C. Sandstorm)
- Produced by: Bruce Campbell; Jeff Franklin; David Goodman; Bob Perkis
- Starring: Bruce Campbell; Tamara Gorski; Vladimir Kolev; Antoinette Byron; Stacy Keach; Ted Raimi
- Cinematography: David Worth
- Edited by: Shawn Paper
- Music by: Joseph LoDuca
- Distributed by: Syfy
- Release date: April 1, 2005
- Running time: 90 minutes
- Countries: Germany; United States
- Languages: English, Bulgarian; Russian
- Budget: $3 million

Man with the Screaming Brain is a 2005 science fiction/slapstick film co-written, produced, and directed by Bruce Campbell, who also stars. It is Campbell's feature film directorial debut. The film was co-written by David Goodman and co-stars Ted Raimi.

The film centers on William Cole, a wealthy American executive who travels to Bulgaria with his wife, only for their marriage and lives to unravel after she begins an affair with their taxi driver, Yegor. A violent encounter with a vengeful maid leaves William and Yegor dead, but William is revived through a brain transplant that forces him to share his body with Yegor's consciousness.

== Plot ==
William Cole, the CEO of a U.S. drug company, travels to Bulgaria with his wife, Jackie, in the hopes of diversifying his company's financial interests. Cole is a stereotypical ugly American who constantly complains about the lack of Americanization of the former communist country. They're driven to a hotel by a taxi driver, and former KGB agent, named Yegor Stragov. Yegor gives William a ring to give to Jackie. While William is at a subway construction site, Jackie has a fling with Yegor.

William gets back to the hotel and bumps into Tatoya, a gypsy woman who works there as a maid, and who kills men who dump her. Jackie catches William kissing Tatoya and tells him their marriage is over. William chases Tatoya, who picked his pocket and stole money and a ring (revealed to be Tatoya's, given by her to Yegor when they dated), and Tatoya bludgeons him with a pipe outside the hotel and knocks him unconscious. Yegor witnesses this, so Tatoya kills him with his own gun.

A vengeful Jackie has William removed from life support at the hospital, and then goes to Gypsy Town where Tatoya lives and attempts to kill her, only to have Tatoya kill her instead by throwing her down a flight of stairs. Meanwhile, a still alive William wakes up in the warehouse of Russian scientist Dr. Ivan Ivanovich Ivanov, and learns that he and his idiotic assistant Pavel have removed the damaged parts of William's brain and replaced it with healthy tissue from Yegor's. When William runs out of the warehouse, he discovers he can hear Yegor's voice in his head; together they both plan to "get the woman that killed us both." Jackie, whose body was also taken by Dr. Ivanov and Pavel, has her brain put inside a robot. She too escapes and plans to exact revenge on Tatoya.

William/Yegor and Robo-Jackie chase Tatoya around town. William gets involved in a car crash with his foot underneath a car and Tatoya makes another attempt to kill William by setting the leaking car gasoline alight. Jackie saves him and is presumed dead in the explosion. After avoiding some bar punks that believe William "raped Tatoya on her wedding day", William/Yegor begin suffering brain damage due to their cells not able to coexist in the same head. Jackie, who had survived the explosion, appears and attempts to kill Tatoya by throwing her off a bridge; until Tatoya stabs Jackie's brain, causing her to malfunction, and has Jackie thrown off the bridge. William chases Tatoya through the subway construction and the sewer and finally kills Tatoya by dropping her in sewer river, but not before taking back the ring. William and Jackie then confess their love for each other before Jackie's batteries finally die, as does William due to the brain cells of him and Yegor wearing out. Pavel brings William, Jackie and Tatoya's body back to Dr. Ivanov to fix them, as he had earlier found a way to make William and Yegor's brain cells coexist in the same head.

Six months later, William has returned to the U.S. and is still sharing his body with Yegor's brain now completely synchronized and stabilized. He goes to a brain trauma benefit with Jackie, whose brain had been transferred into Tatoya's body.

== Cast ==
- Bruce Campbell as William Cole
- Tamara Gorski as Tatoya
- Ted Raimi as Pavel
- Antoinette Byron as Jackie Cole
- Stacy Keach as Dr. Ivan Ivanovich Ivanov
- Vladimir Kolev as Yegor Stragov
- Valentine Glasbeily as Uri
- Velizar Binev as The Mayor
- Raicho Vasilev as The Bartender
- Jonas Talkington as Larry
- Mihail Elanov as Punk #1
- Neda Sokolovska as The Waitress
- Remington Franklin as Bar Punk
- Todor Nikolov as Doctor (uncredited)
- Yuri Safchev as Tatoya's Father (uncredited)

== Production ==
The Man with the Screaming Brain was originally supposed to take place in East L.A., but it was shot in Bulgaria instead, in order to save production costs. Campbell persuaded Syfy to let him rewrite the script so that it would be set in Bulgaria, instead of trying to make Bulgaria look like East L.A., which saved the production further money.

== Release ==
The production was financed in part by the Sci Fi Channel, where it was aired for the first time on television on September 25, 2005. It premiered on April 3, 2005 at the IHouse in Philadelphia, Pennsylvania. It was supposed to premiere that same night at the Broadway Theater in Pitman, New Jersey; however, that theater went bankrupt earlier in the week and a new venue was found (the IHouse).

Campbell then took the film with him on his book tour and it was shown at a limited number of theaters throughout the summer of 2005.

== Reception ==
Rotten Tomatoes, a review aggregator, reports that 33% of 12 surveyed critics gave the film a positive review; the average rating was 4.9/10. Joshua Siebalt of Dread Central rated it 3/5 stars and wrote, "The story is pretty ridiculous from start to finish, but that's not necessarily a bad thing since the film doesn't take itself seriously at all." Rob Gonsalves of eFilmCritic.com rated it 4/5 stars and called it "a decent and diverting piece of work from perhaps the hardest-working man in movies."

Negative reviews came from Dennis Harvey of Variety, who called it "a comedy that doesn't build, lacks structural integrity, and often falls flat. But it's also winningly loopy, with bizarre incidental ideas and performance riffing making for a series of parts that almost make up for the faults of the whole", and Mark de la Viña of San Jose Mercury News, who called it "an unapologetically sloppy jumble of Roger Corman-style antics that could only hope to inspire their own drinking game."

== Adaptations ==
Dark Horse Comics published a four-issue comic book series based on the film.
