= Daniel Fitzgerald (Neighbours) =

- Neighbours character
- Brett Tucker as Daniel Fitzgerald (2009)
- Portrayed by: Brett Tucker (1999–2010); James Roach (2011 flashback)
- Duration: 1999–2000, 2007–2011
- First appearance: 1 September 1999
- Last appearance: 4 July 2011
- Introduced by: Stanley Walsh (1999); Ric Pellizzeri (2007); Susan Bower (2011)
In-universe information
- Occupation: Teacher; Counsellor
- Father: Patrick Fitzgerald
- Brothers: Lucas Fitzgerald
- Wife: Samantha Fitzgerald (2002–2008); Libby Kennedy (2009–2010)
- Sons: Adam Fitzgerald
- Stepsons: Ben Kirk

Daniel "Dan" Fitzgerald is a fictional character from the Australian soap opera Neighbours, played by Brett Tucker. He made his first screen appearance during the episode broadcast on 1 September 1999. Dan becomes a teacher at Erinsborough High and shares a house with fellow teacher, Tess Bell. He remained as a recurring character until 2000. Tucker returned on 30 October 2007 and became part of the regular cast. Dan re-joined the high school and he began a relationship with Libby Kennedy. In June 2009, it was announced that Tucker had quit the show and Dan departed on 1 December 2009. On 13 September 2010, Dan made a one-off appearance which was filmed prior to Tucker's departure in 2009. The character later appeared in a flashback broadcast on 4 July 2011, played by James Roach.

== Casting ==
Tucker previously played the role of Dan for a year from September 1999 to September 2000. In 2007, it was announced that Tucker would be reprising his role of Dan, just as Neighbours began returning to its roots of family-focused drama. Tucker returned as a regular cast member and said that it was "great being back".

In June 2009, it was announced that Tucker was to quit Neighbours when his contract expired in September that year. Tucker said "My contract was always two years and that was planned from day one, I have loved the opportunity, it has been fantastic to be on the show". Following the announcement, it was speculated that the character of Dan would be recast. However, producers confirmed to entertainment website Digital Spy that there were no plans to recast Dan.

In early September 2010, it was revealed that the character would make a one-off appearance in a scene to be broadcast on 13 September, after having previously appeared in audio recordings on 26 July. Tucker had filmed and recorded both prior to his departure in 2009. Carla Bonner (Stephanie Scully) told TV Week that Tucker "loved the fact that Dan Fitzgerald still has such a presence in the show. Even though the character has physically left, his legacy lives on". In 2011, James Roach portrayed a seven-year-old Dan in flashbacks.

== Character development ==
On the character of Dan, Tucker said "Daniel's a regular, all-round good guy". He also said that Dan has become "a bit of a hero and is constantly saving people". Tucker added that when Dan fell for Libby, he went through "his own personal turmoil" as he is attracted to her, but her past relationship has not been resolved. Dan would like to move forward, but it's difficult because it does not happen quickly.

Network Ten say Dan is "dependable", which makes him the perfect school counsellor and friend. They describe him as being "laid-back but determined when he puts his mind to something". He is also easy-going and passionate, with a "sly sense of humour". However, he is slow to open up to and trust people with his true feelings.

Dan starts a relationship with Libby Kennedy (Kym Valentine), Whilst interviewed by TV Week, Valentine stated: "In the next few months, there is a hint of romance for Libby & Dan." Tucker added: "There was definitely an immediate attraction for Daniel when it came to Libby. And he becomes more interested over the next few months. Something is brewing! They knew each other briefly back then, but they weren't in any kind of relationship. At the time, Dan was in a bit of a love triangle with Tess & Steph. This time, he's single & it's the first time he's been attracted to someone in a long while" Dan harbours certain secrets he is keen to keep from Libby, of this Tucker states: "Dan is hiding a few things & if he does want things to work out with Libby, he'll have to clean out his closet, so to speak. Whether Dan likes it or not, he'll be forced to face his past & deal with it." Valentine also opines: "There is an emotional upset. Libby will begin to feel like she's constantly being let down by men. She can't seem to take a trick. Guys just keep disappointing her." Tucker added that it was never planned for Libby & Dan to have a trouble free relationship, although he previously thought otherwise.

== Storylines ==
=== 1999–2000 ===
Daniel joins Erinsborough High School as a trainee teacher. He is invited to move in with colleague Tess Bell (Krista Vendy) by Anne Wilkinson (Brooke Satchwell). Tess worries that her abusive ex-husband Brendan (Blair Venn) will find out about Dan, who begs her to let him move in. Tess and Dan's students begin gossiping and spreading rumours about them and Dan later moves out. Brendan arrives in town to see Tess, but when he finds out that she had gone clubbing with Dan, he races out of Ramsay Street. He crashes into Stephanie and Libby and he dies. Dan comes to see Tess and apologises. Tess lets him move back in

Dan becomes friends with Drew Kirk (Dan Paris) and Paul McClain (Jansen Spencer) and falls for Steph. They go on a date, but it ends badly. Tess later admits that she has fallen for Dan she cannot tell him and decides to move out. Daniel finds out the truth and tells her that he had liked her when they first met. Dan later leaves town.

=== 2007–2010 ===
Dan returns to Erinsborough and becomes the school counsellor. On the advice of departing colleague, Pepper Steiger (Nicky Whelan), he helps Ringo Brown (Sam Clark) with his eating disorder. Dan begins a relationship with Libby Kennedy and he tells her about his wife, Samantha (Simone Buchanan). Sam became pregnant, but she miscarried the baby and that triggered her bipolar disorder. Dan became more her carer than her husband and their marriage fell apart. Dan begins to look for Sam, so he can divorce her. Sam arrives in town and she asks him to give their marriage another go. Sam suffers a relapse of her bipolar disorder after failing to take her medication. This leads to her acting inappropriately and she lies to Dan. She claims she is pregnant and the lie quickly spins out of control. Dan agrees to move to New Zealand with her to start a new life, but Sam leaves him alone at the airport, knowing he still had feelings for Libby. Sam leaves Dan the divorce papers, but Libby refuses to get involved with him again.

Dan's brother, Lucas (Scott Major) arrives in town and starts dating Libby. Dan and Lucas fight, but they eventually make up. Libby finds out that Lucas is Dan's brother and cuts both men out of her life. Dan and Libby both apply to for the Acting Head of Senior School. Libby forgets her notes during her interview because she was helping Zeke Kinski (Matthew Werkmeister) with his essay. Dan gets the job, but turns it down after learning that Libby forgot her notes. When Libby finds out, she goes to see him and Dan tells her that he loves her. Libby and Ben (Blake O'Leary) move in with Dan and he later proposes to her.

A pregnant Sam returns to town on the night of Libby and Dan's engagement party. She reveals that she is carrying Dan's child. Dan is excited when he finds Sam is expecting a girl and they decide to name her Emma. Steph overhears an argument between Cassandra Freedman (Tottie Goldsmith) and Sam, and she discovers that Sam's baby is not Dan's. Dan confronts Sam and she willingly offers to take a paternity test hoping that he would not let her go through with it. However, Sam admits that the baby is not his and she leaves Erinsborough.

On the day of the wedding, Libby begins to feel unwell. She collapses at the end of the ceremony and is rushed to hospital. Libby and Dan discover that Libby is pregnant. Libby believes that she is carrying a girl and she and Dan ask Susan Kennedy (Jackie Woodburne) if they could name her Grace, after Susan's mother. However, the same day Libby collapses and she loses the baby. Dan then has to give the doctors permission to perform a hysterectomy.

Libby and Dan agree to try surrogacy. Steph offers to carry their baby, but is told by Karl Kennedy (Alan Fletcher) that it could bring her breast cancer back. Susan then offers and Dan and Libby accept. After being told they could go ahead with the surrogacy by the hospital, the family face abuse from the public when Paul Robinson (Stefan Dennis) prints the story in the paper. This causes the hospital board to cease their support for the surrogacy. The family challenge the ruling and the board change their minds. After learning that Susan has fallen pregnant, Dan finds it difficult to relate to her. This causes arguments and tension between Libby, Dan, Karl and Susan. When the situation gets worse, Karl books a holiday home for them all. Dan and Susan have an argument about where the baby should be brought up and Dan announces that he should not have agreed to the surrogacy. Dan decides to go for a walk and Susan joins him. She tries to talk to him, but he walks off. Susan tries to run after him, but trips and falls. She calls out to him, but he cannot hear her as he is wearing headphones. Susan miscarries the baby.

Libby and Dan's relationship begins to fall apart. Libby blames Dan for the miscarriage and Susan's MS relapse. Dan agrees to try counselling, but he walks out on the session, claiming that he does not need to be there. Libby and Dan have dinner together and they decide to end their marriage. Dan goes to Charlie's and he and Steph begin to reminisce about the past. They share a kiss and later sleep together. Feeling guilty, Dan decides to leave Erinsborough. Just before leaving, Libby catches him leaving a bicycle for Ben without saying goodbye and she tells him to go. Dan then gets in his car and leaves the town for good.

Steph falls pregnant with Dan's child. A few months later, Dan calls Lucas to tell him that he has been in an accident. Lucas then reveals that the accident has left Dan unable to father children. Steph calls Dan to tell him about the baby and he tells her that he wants to be a part of the baby's life. Steph gives birth to a boy and she decides to give Dan sole custody of the child. Dan asks what his son's name is, but Steph tells him that it is for him to choose. As Steph leaves, Dan tells her that he is calling the baby Adam.

== Reception ==
For his portrayal of Dan, Tucker was nominated for Sexiest Male at the 2009 Inside Soap Awards. Michael Lallo from The Age said Tucker raised "the hunk quotient". A Daily Record critic also noticed the character's looks, writing "Come on, girls, admit it – most of you would be happy if Dan Fitzgerald planted a big kiss on you. He is, after all, the best-looking bloke in Erinsborough – not that there's too much competition." They noted that like Dan, Libby held her former husband Drew Kirk (Dan Paris) "at arm's length" before they married, which Dan would do well to remember, as it suggested their relationship would likely work out well.

In her monthly list of best and worst soap characters, Ruth Deller of entertainment website Lowculture, placed Dan second on the worst characters list for March 2009. Deller said "Oh, Fitzy. It started so well, but the last few months we have watched you being a complete tosspot towards Sam and being part of the most self-righteous couple in soap. I'm sure the scriptwriters want us to be on your side, but being vaguely fit isn't enough any more. A horse-related accident (see Drew, Frazer) is what's needed to restore some humility – or to kill you off, either would do.

After Dan gave Sam his and Libby's savings, another writer for the Daily Record said "What a silly boy Dan is. He's always been the first person everyone on Ramsay Street could turn to in a crisis, the kind we'd all love to have on our side. But Libby is discovering that being married to somebody who wants to do the best thing for everybody can be a nightmare."
