= Benjamin Grant Mitchell =

Australian singer-songwriter, writer, and actor

- Born: 1969 (age 56–57); Sale, Greater Manchester, England
- Other name: Ben Mitchell
- Education: Victoria College, Melbourne
- Occupations: Actor; musician; writer
- Known for: Skirts; Neighbours

Benjamin Grant Mitchell (born 1969), generally known as Ben Mitchell, is an Australian singer-songwriter, actor, and writer, perhaps known for his roles as Bevan Quinn in the police drama Skirts and Cameron Hudson in the soap opera Neighbours. Mitchell has released four albums and written two novels.

== Early life ==
Mitchell was born in 1969 in Sale, Greater Manchester to Australians Robert and Lynette Mitchell. His parents came to Britain to work on the Blue Streak project, until its cancellation. The family moved to Australia when Mitchell was 11 months old. The family moved from Sydney, to Melbourne, Perth and Los Angeles as Mitchell's father was a minister of religion until he decided to quit. The family stayed with friends in Sydney until Mitchell's parents found new occupations. Mitchell studied drama and dance at Victoria College.

== Career ==
=== Acting ===
Mitchell appeared in several bit parts, until he secured his "big break" in 1990, when he was cast as Bevan Quinn in the Seven Network police drama Skirts. He signed a three year contract, however, Skirts was cancelled that same year. Mitchell appeared in miniseries Bony, and the 1990 feature film Father. In 1992, after appearing in a production of The Wizard of Oz at the Victoria State Opera, he joined the main cast of soap opera Neighbours as lawyer Cameron Hudson. He previously had minor roles in the show as a Coffee Shop customer, and the original Brad Willis for three episodes in 1989.

After his character was written out of Neighbours, Mitchell went to the UK and took over the role of Wishee Washee in Aladdin from his former co-star Jeremy Angerson. He also guested in an episode of Celebrity Squares. After appearing in a play in Melbourne, Mitchell returned to the UK in 1994 to star as the Beast in a production of Beauty and Beast in Chesterfield. He also co-hosted an episode of Ryantown, and appeared with his former Neighbours co-stars Simone Robertson and Felice Arena on children's variety show Hangar 17.

He guested as Troy Keogh in a 1996 episode of Blue Heelers, where he was credited with his full name instead of the shortened Ben Mitchell. In 2008, Mitchell re-joined Neighbours in the recurring role of Matt Freedman, the father of Donna Freedman (played by Margot Robbie). He appeared in the independent film Chocolate Strawberry Vanilla in 2013, followed by a role in the M is for Mutant segment of anthology film ABC's of Death 2½ in 2016. Both films were directed by Stuart Simpson.

=== Music ===
Mitchell was a member of the Melbourne rock band Tin Canal until they disbanded in 1993. While living in London in the late 1990s and early 2000s, Mitchell founded and performed at an open-mike session called Acoustic Trip at The Lock Tavern, Camden, at the beginning of London's "New Acoustic Movement". Acts to have appeared at Acoustic Trip included Kate Havnevik, James Blunt, Cookie, Smoke Fairies, Louis Eliot (Rialto) and Martha Tilston.

Mitchell has independently released three albums: 'The Stars Can See (2006), Chance To Love (2015) and Summer Lover (2016). Mitchell's fourth album, Slow Is The New Fast was produced by Matt Walker (Australian musician) and was released on 10 October 2019. An independent artist, Mitchell's music is licensed through Open Sea Music.

In 2016, Mitchell had a Number 1 song on the Australian Music Radio Airplay Project Every track from Chance To Love and Summer Lover albums have received radio play at, or soon after, release on Australian Community Radio stations. In 2015, Mitchell was chosen as the featured Artist for 'Play Vic Week 2015' by the Community Broadcasters Association of Victoria.

Mitchell has performed in Australia, England, Scotland, Germany, France and The Netherlands, with appearances at Marysville Jazz & Blues Weekend, Queenscliff Music Festival, Spydafest UK, End of The Line, Maroondah Festival (Croydon), Moonee Ponds Festival and Healesville Music Festival.

==== The Stars Can See ====
Mitchell lived and worked in London from 1998 to 2004 where he wrote and recorded the songs for his debut album, The Stars Can See. The Stars Can See was released by MGM Distribution MGM Distribution and picked up by independent radio stations in Australia including 3JJJ, 3RRR and most notably PBS 106.7FM. It features Claire Worrall from Robbie Williams band on keyboards, Pete Cuthbert (Rialto) on drums, Ben Sargeant (from The Script) on bass guitar and was co-produced by Mitchell and Ken Brake at Regal Lane Studios, Primrose Hill.

==== Chance To Love ====
Recorded in Healesville, Yarra Valley, Victoria, Australia, every song on Chance To Love (2015) received radio play across Australia, mostly from community and independent radio stations. Mitchell played all the instruments and produced the album which was released on 17 April 2015.

Mitchell's 2015 independent release, Chance To Love, featured 17 songs, each of which was played on radio stations Australia wide, and in Ireland and UK. Stephen Walker from 3RRR's 'Skullcave' called Chance To Love his "favourite local release at the moment."; The Music's Jeff Jenkins called it "a late night gem."

==== Summer Lover ====
Summer Lover was released on 21 June 2016. It was recorded in Healesville and mixed by mixed by Simon Russell (whose credits include Hiatus Kaiyote, Human Face, The Melodics and Husky). It features Andy Taite on bass, Glenn Maynard (Pollyanna) on drums and Shane Reilly (Tex Perkins, Lost Ragas) on pedal steel and baritone guitar.

=== Writing ===
Starting out as a songwriter, Mitchell moved into longer form writing including blogging and novel writing.

He wrote The Last Great Day (ISBN 978-0-646-55032-9), an autobiographical novel released in April 2011. The novel was inspired by his childhood spent in a doomsday cult his parents joined. He felt that his experiences would make for a good story. To promote the book, Mitchell appeared at the Melbourne Writers Festival.

A long-time fan of Elvis Presley, Mitchell wrote Zippin Pippin (ISBN 978-0-987-38031-9), a comedy-romance-road-trip about Elvis Presley's unknown, illegitimate Australian son.

== Acting credits ==
Film and Television performances
Year	Title	Role	Notes
1989	Neighbours	Coffee shop customer	Guest
1989	Neighbours	Brad Willis	Guest
1990	Father		
1990	Skirts	Constable Bevan Quinn	Main cast
1992	Bony		Miniseries
1992–1993	Neighbours	Cameron Hudson	Main cast
1994	Ryantown	Co-host	1 episode
1994	Hangar 17	Himself	1 episode
1996	Blue Heelers	Troy Keogh	Episode: "Sex and Death"
2008	Neighbours	Matt Freedman	Recurring
2014	Chocolate Strawberry Vanilla	Tommo	
2015	Baby Did a Bat Bat Thing	Evangelist	Short film
2016	ABC's of Death 2½		Anthology film, segment: "M is for Mutant"

Theatre performances
Year	Title	Role	Notes
1990	Pippin		Noarlunga College Theatre, Adelaide with South Australian Youth Theatre Company
1992	The Wizard of Oz		Victoria State Opera
1993–1994	Aladdin	Wishee Washee	Sunderland Empire Theatre, UK
1994	Beauty and Beast	The Beast	Chesterfield, UK
1994–1995	Cinderella	Prince Charming	Charter Theatre, Preston, UK
2008	This is Good Advice (This is a Chair by Caryl Churchill and Advice to Iraqi Women by Martin Crimp)		Trades Hall New Ballroom, Melbourne with Welcome Stranger

=== As crew ===
Year	Title	Role	Notes
1989	Jazzland	Sound Operator / Engineer	Clare Town Hall, Wirreanda High School, Adelaide, Space Theatre, Adelaide with Jumbuck Youth Music Theatre
2006	Little Shop of Horrors	Producer	Woodbin Theatre, Geelong with Geelong Repertory Theatre Company
