= Steph Scully =

Fictional character in Neighbours

Stephanie Scully
- Neighbours character
- Portrayed by: Carla Bonner
- Duration: 1999–2010, 2013, 2015–2018, 2022
- First appearance: 20 October 1999
- Last appearance: 28 July 2022
- Introduced by: Stanley Walsh (1999); Richard Jasek (2013); Jason Herbison (2015)
- Spin-off appearances: Steph in Prison (2013)
In-universe information
- Other names: Stephanie Hoyland
- Occupation: Courier; Barmaid; Mechanic; Owner of Charlie's; Councillor; Manager of Harold's Store; Co-owner of Robinsons Motel; Co-owner of The Flametree Retreat
- Father: Joe Scully
- Mother: Lyn Scully
- Brothers: Jack Scully; Oscar Scully
- Sisters: Felicity Scully; Michelle Scully
- Husband: Max Hoyland (2004–2007); Toadie Rebecchi (2010)
- Sons: Charlie Hoyland; Adam Fitzgerald
- Stepsons: Boyd Hoyland
- Stepdaughters: Summer Hoyland
- Grandfathers: Charlie Cassidy; Pat Scully
- Grandmothers: Valda Sheergold
- Uncles: Tom Scully; Mick Scully; Michael Cassidy
- Other relatives: Connie O'Rourke; Henry O'Rourke

Stephanie Scully (also Hoyland) is a fictional character from the Australian soap opera Neighbours, played by Carla Bonner. She made her first screen appearance during the episode that was broadcast on 20 October 1999. Following Bonner's decision to quit the show after eleven years, Steph departed on 24 November 2010. In November 2012, it was announced that Bonner would be reprising the role for a two-month guest stint and Steph returned on 15 April 2013. Bonner reprised the role permanently in July 2015 and made her on-screen return on 2 October 2015. On 17 May 2018, it was confirmed that Bonner would be departing the show imminently and Steph made her final appearance on 7 June 2018. Bonner made a cameo in the show's final episode broadcast on 28 July 2022.

Steph is the eldest daughter of Joe (Shane Connor) and Lyn Scully (Janet Andrewartha). Steph's storylines have included marrying Max Hoyland (Stephen Lovatt), becoming a stepmother to his children Boyd (Kyal Marsh) and Summer (Marisa Siketa), battling breast cancer, pregnancy, being the victim of a stabbing and infidelity. Upon her return, Steph revealed that she had suffered a breakdown in prison and became determined to win back her former boyfriend, Lucas Fitzgerald (Scott Major). After kidnapping Lucas's son, Steph was sectioned. Following her release, she returned to Erinsborough to rebuild her life and reconnect with her son. Steph has proven popular with critics and viewers, who named her their favourite Neighbours character in 2010.

== Creation and casting ==
The Scully family were created and introduced to Neighbours following the departure of the Martin family. Stephanie was introduced along with her parents Lyn (Janet Andrewartha) and Joe (Shane Connor) and her younger sisters Felicity (Holly Valance) and Michelle (Kate Keltie). Reporters for eBroadcast said Stephanie was twenty years old and preferred leathers and motorbikes to the hobbies of her peers. In September 1999, Jason Herbison of Inside Soap reported that former Heartbreak High star Emma Roche had joined the cast of Neighbours as Stephanie. However, Roche unexpectedly quit the role after three weeks.

When Carla Bonner dropped by to see her agent, she was on the phone to the Neighbours casting director, Jan Russ. Russ asked to see Bonner straightaway for an audition for the part of Stephanie. Bonner had little acting experience, having appeared in television bit parts, but she went over to Russ' office and was given a script for a cold read. She was asked to go to the studio the next day, where she auditioned again. She then received a call to say she had got the part. Bonner had to learn nineteen scenes by the next day and develop the character of Stephanie quickly. Four days after her audition with Russ, she began filming. Bonner had to shoot three weeks worth of scenes in one week.

== Development ==
=== Characterisation ===
Steph is the only original member of the Scully family to have remained on the street. Steph is a tomboy with a passion for mechanics and motorbikes. Holy Soap said Steph is "one of the most dependable characters on the street." TV Week describe Steph as being "more into Grand Prix racing than girly stuff, but that hasn't stopped her from having her fair share of weddings and more than her fair share of romantic dramas". They also add that she has proven to be a loyal friend, a great mother to Charlie and a great stepmother.

=== Relationships ===
Steph's later relationships with Max Hoyland (Stephen Lovatt) and Toadfish Rebecchi (Ryan Moloney) were main focal points in her storylining. Steph is strong, but the breakdown of her marriage nearly destroyed her. Of Max's departure and the effect it has on Steph, Bonner stated during an interview with television magazine What's on TV: "Torn. She still loves him but she's also angry with him. I think she wants to move on because she knows she has to prepare herself for the fact he might never come home." Steph's best friend Toadie gives her a shoulder to cry on, they later start a relationship. Bonner further discusses their relationship in the same interview adding: "Steph and Toadie have been friends for years, but it’s never extended beyond friendship. Until now [...] I think it's inevitable when you start spending so much time with someone that after a while they just fit into your life. Toadie’s been a fantastic support to Steph, there every step of the way."

Describing the developments in Steph and Toadie's relationship during 2008, Dan Bennet speaking for Network Ten states: "Steph has already agreed to a long engagement with Toadie, but she's not ready to marry. This relationship will reach a massive fork in the road early in the new year. Toadie will force Steph to decide what she wants from this relationship."

=== Breast cancer ===
One of the biggest storylines for Steph saw her being diagnosed with breast cancer. Bonner wanted to play the scenes with honesty and said that "it was important that Steph went through the whole thing". Bonner prepared for the storyline by researching the condition. She said "It wasn't something I was going to take lightly it was something very serious. It was important to raise awareness and important not to offend anybody". Bonner also turned to a family friend who had survived breast cancer and asked her questions about the condition. However, with other aspects of the condition, like hair loss, Bonner had to find her "own truth". The storyline was exhausting for Bonner, but it gave her a chance to show a different side to her character and it became a "rewarding personal challenge". On Steph's reaction to the cancer, Bonner said "It's just a huge learning curve and it's a huge life experience".

Bonner called the reaction to the storyline and the amount of publicity the condition gained "amazing". She revealed that she had received letters from members of the public complimenting her performance. She said "People seem to be so appreciative of the awareness that I seem to have raised". Bonner's doctor back home in Australia also told her that she would be amazed at the amount of awareness the storyline would raise. Executive producer Ric Pellizzeri revealed that a female viewer had sent in a letter of thanks for the cancer storyline, after she copied a breast examination that Steph had done and found a cancerous lump. Viewers watched Steph going through treatment for the cancer and it eventually went into remission. The cancer becomes active when Steph is pregnant and she almost died after deciding to give birth before resuming treatment.

=== Departure ===
In June 2010, it was announced that Bonner was to leave Neighbours after 11 years on the show. On her departure, Neighbours executive producer, Susan Bower, said "I'm very sad that Carla is leaving us and she knows the door is always open for Steph to return to Ramsay Street". Bonner began filming her last scenes in September and she said that she was feeling "very emotional" about leaving. Bonner said Steph's exit storyline was not what viewers would have imagined. She said "It's so out of the character, however the storyline is so strong and supports the outcome". Bonner added that Bower has made it possible for her to return in the future.

=== Return (2013) ===
On 4 November 2012, it was confirmed that Bonner would be returning to Neighbours. She began filming her scenes from January 2013 and would be on-screen for two months. Bonner stated that she was "elated" to revisit the role of Steph and explained "We always knew when I left they would revisit her. When they contacted me and said it was time, there was no question of if I wanted to do it – of course I did!" Bonner said that she had received many emails and tweets from fans asking for Steph to come back to Neighbours, so she was happy to be able to please them. Steph returned during the episode broadcast on 15 April 2013.

Bonner revealed that due to having a rough time in prison and losing custody of her son Charlie (Alexander McGuire), Steph is "a bit damaged". She returns to Erinsborough to settle a score with someone and Bonner said "There's a bit of anger that has brewed while she's in prison and she's definitely had a bit of time to think things over." TV Week's Erin Miller proclaimed that there would be plenty of scenes between Steph and her former partner, Lucas Fitzgerald (Scott Major), with Bonner commenting that Steph might be looking for comfort and familiarity with him. In April, further details of Steph's return were released. Bonner told TV Week's Jackie Brygel that Steph wants rehabilitation and to get her life in order. Steph's reappearance is met with "some bewilderment" from Toadie, while Lucas is happy to see her again. Steph has become hopeful that Lucas has waited for her, but she soon learns that Lucas is in a relationship with Vanessa Villante (Alin Sumarwata).

When Steph announces that she is going to run Harold's Store, where Vanessa works, she tries to reassure her that she no longer has any interest in Lucas. However, Steph is "visibly shaken" when she learns that Lucas and Vanessa have a child. Bonner explained "Steph is floored by the baby news – it was the last thing she expected. She realises now that Lucas is a totally different person from whom he once was (before she began her prison sentence) and she is rocked to her core." Sergeant Matt Turner (Josef Brown) becomes curious about the reasons for Steph's return and he questions her about failing a previous parole application. Bonner told Brygel that Steph is not willing to reveal any details about her time in prison, although the audience knows something has happened in there.

Weeks later, Steph kidnapped Lucas's infant son Patrick (Basquait Voevodin-Knack). Major said that the situation was "scary" for Lucas and he had finally realised "just how unhinged" Steph had become. Vanessa also blamed Lucas for bringing Steph into their lives, as she had seen that Steph was unstable before he did. Finding Steph and Patrick initially proved difficult as Steph turned off her phone, but she got in contact with Lucas again to tell him that she was at a place that was special to them both. Major said, "Lucas works out that Steph is referring to the last night they spent together before she went to jail – in the men's shed." Lucas and the police raced to the shed, where they found Steph with Patrick.

=== Reintroduction ===
On 19 July 2015, Neighbours teased Bonner's return on their Twitter page. The Herald Sun confirmed her return later that day and reported that Bonner had begun filming the previous week. Bonner admitted that she felt like she was "coming home" and added "It's an institution for fans and it's a reliable place. The producers had discussed potential storylines, which reignited my passion for Steph, and I was ready to bring back the character. It just felt right." Steph would return to Erinsborough under "a cloud of suspicion" following her arrest for kidnapping Patrick Villante in 2013. Series producer Jason Herbison explained, "her return to Ramsay Street will be explosive and her presence will divide the residents." Steph made her on-screen return on 2 October 2015.

Bonner explained that Steph had been sectioned following her arrest in 2013 and had spent the past two years in a mental institution. Her return to Erinsborough came as part of her day-release programme and Steph hoped to be discharged from the hospital eventually. Bonner told TV Choice's Clyde McGarrigle, "Doctors have advised her to return to a place where she has a support network/ Despite all the trouble she caused, Steph believes she needs to return to Erinsborough so she can rebuild her life." Steph found employment at the garage again and she bonded with the manager Tyler Brennan (Travis Burns), who was unaware of her past. When other Erinsborough residents learned of her return, they were not so welcoming. Bonner commented that Steph knew she had "a lot of making up to do."

In September, it was announced that Steph would also be in a same-sex relationship upon her return. Steph has been dating a woman named Belinda Bell (Nikki Shiels), who later follows her to Erinsborough. Their relationship will be tested when Belinda does not agree with the ways in which Steph tries to make amends with her neighbours. Of the storyline, Bonner said "The way that it has been written, it's very sensitive and certainly not smutty. I'm very happy with how it plays out. If it contributes to normalising same-sex relationships in some way, that's great." It later emerged that Belinda was Steph's psychiatric nurse, who helped her through her time at the hospital. Bonner said the women fell in love and it would become clear that they had a "beautiful, deep connection".

=== Relationship with Mark Brennan ===
In March 2016, Steph was paired with Mark Brennan (Scott McGregor). The relationship starts when Mark asks Steph to help him with his motorbike repairs. She enjoys his company and Bonner pointed out that he was different from most of the men Steph had been around before. She explained, "I think for the first time in ages she finds a man that she feels comfortable with." Steph kisses Mark, but he is reluctant to take things further, which leaves her feeling embarrassed and she orders him to leave. When Charlie comes to visit Steph, Mark spends the day with them and gives Charlie a ride in his police car. Steph is "touched" by his kindness and when she goes to thank him, they end up kissing again and have sex. However, Mark is unsure where he stands, while Steph is worried that her previous relationship with Belinda will be an issue. Their romance is also tested by Mark's former fiancée Paige Smith (Olympia Valance), who tells Mark that Steph is just using him to gain custody of Charlie. Mark confronts Steph, and they initially agree to remain friends, but soon realise that they want to be a couple. When Paige once again tells Mark that Steph is using him, Steph confronts Paige and they get into a physical fight. The following day, Paige comes to apologise to Steph and soon realises Mark has stayed the night.

Steph and Mark's relationship is put under strain when they try to have a child via surrogacy. Steph finds herself attracted to Victoria Lamb (Claudia Greenstone) and an Inside Soap columnist noted their chemistry was "sizzling". When Steph sees Victoria has been stood up on a date, she offers her support. The women spend the evening talking and laughing together, which leads to Victoria kissing Steph. Steph feels guilty about cheating on Mark and immediately admits what happened. She also tells him she has doubts about the surrogacy.

=== Departure (2018) ===
In March 2018, Bonner replied to a fan's query about Steph's lack of storylines by saying they were being "weaned" off her character, leading to speculation that she was leaving the show. On 17 May, Sophie Dainty of Digital Spy confirmed that Bonner had exited Neighbours, and her last scenes aired on 7 June. The actress thanked fans for their support. On-screen, Steph decides to leave Erinsborough for a fresh start in Sydney, where she can be closer to her son.

Bonner reprised the role for a cameo appearance in the show's final episode, which was broadcast on 28 July 2022.

== Storylines ==
Steph arrives in Ramsay Street with her family. The move helps her get over her failed relationship with Larry "Woody" Woodhouse (Andrew Curry), who is in jail for armed robbery. Steph immediately attracts the attentions of Toadfish Rebecchi and Lance Wilkinson (Andrew Bibby), but she falls for Drew Kirk (Dan Paris). Steph becomes good friends with Drew's girlfriend, Libby Kennedy (Kym Valentine). Steph and Libby are knocked off Steph's bike by Brendan Bell (Blair Venn). Steph comes away with torn ligaments, but Libby is left in a critical condition, which causes Steph to become depressed. Libby and Drew break up, but Steph is upset when Drew admits he still loves Libby. Steph then briefly dates Daniel Fitzgerald (Brett Tucker). Steph agrees to run away with Woody after he is released from prison. While she is getting drinks for them, Woody suddenly takes off in the car and crashes. Steph is prevented from pulling Woody out of the resulting fire. Steph begins dating Woody's friend, Mitch Foster (Hugh Sexton). However, Woody returns, having been in hiding, and Steph tells them both to leave. Mitch later robs her workplace and Steph is investigated by the police for the crime.

Steph begins a relationship with Marc Lambert (David Karakai) and they become engaged. During the wedding, Marc looks at Felicity and Steph realises that he loves her sister. Steph refuses to forgive Felicity and goes to stay with Libby and Drew. Steph befriends Summer Hoyland (Marisa Siketa) and her father, Max. Steph and Max agree to be friends and she starts dating Alex Argenzio (Marco Pio Venturini). However, Steph realises that she loves Max and they begin a relationship. After finding a lump in her breast, Steph is told that she has cancer. Steph struggles to cope with the news and ends her relationship with Max. They later reunite and Steph proposes to Max, who accepts. The couple get married in a park. Steph helps her brother, Jack (Jay Bunyan), through his drug problem. Steph sits with her grandfather, Charlie (Cliff Ellen), until he dies. Steph adjusts his pillow, just as Lyn and her brother, Michael (David Paterson), walk in. Michael accuses Steph of murder and she is arrested. Steph is found guilty and given a suspended sentence.

Max and Steph decide to adopt and they meet Kayla Thomas (Virginia Ryan), who decides to give them her unborn child. Kayla later decides to keep her baby. Steph discovers that she is pregnant. She starts having dreams about Drew and realises that her cancer has returned. Steph refuses treatment for her child's health. Steph gives birth to a son, who she and Max name Charlie (Aaron Aulsebrook-Walker; Jacob Brito). Steph then undergoes treatment for cancer and after radiotherapy, she is given the all clear. Max accidentally kills Cameron Robinson (Adam Hunter) and his behaviour changes. He admits himself to a psychiatric ward and later leaves town. Steph kisses Toadie and after he is shot, she confesses to Susan Kennedy (Jackie Woodburne) that she loves him. Max returns and Steph decides to give their marriage another chance, but they realise that things can not go back to how they were and Max leaves.

Toadie and Steph begin a relationship and Steph takes over Max's bar, renaming it Charlie's. Steph also wins a place on the local council. Toadie proposes, but Steph turns him down. She later changes her mind. During the wedding, Steph stumbles over her vows and Toadie calls the whole thing off. Steph then asks Libby and Ty Harper (Dean Geyer) to move in with her. Steph begins dating Jay Duncan (Charlie Clausen). During a picnic in a national park, a bush fire is started. Toadie becomes suspicious of Jay and he discovers that Jay had previously saved a few young mothers from fires. Jay takes Steph and Charlie to a cabin in the country and Steph discovers that Jay was responsible for the fires. She manages to sneak Charlie out of the house and Toadie rescues Steph. Jay is later arrested.

Steph decides that she wants to spend more time with her son and she sells Charlie's to Elle Robinson (Pippa Black), who installs Rebecca Napier (Jane Hall) as manager. Steph later returns to working at the garage with Lucas Fitzgerald. Steph dates Greg Michaels (Nick Farnell), after meeting him online, but they break up when Steph discovers he is married and he becomes jealous of her friendships with other men. Lyn returns to Ramsay Street and persuades Steph to buy Number 26. Steph develops feelings for Lucas. After seeing Libby kiss Lucas, Steph goes to Charlie's and runs into Dan. Dan kisses Steph and they have sex, which leaves them both feeling guilty. Lucas is involved in an accident and Steph supports him and encourages him to attend rehab. Lucas tells her that he loves her, but Steph rejects him. After Lucas professes his love for her again, Steph tells him she loves him too.

Steph suddenly leaves Ramsay Street and she tells Toadie that she is pregnant with Dan's child. Toadie agrees to help Steph and they tell their friends and family that they are back together. Steph's pregnancy is later revealed. Steph finds a lump in her breast and fears that her cancer has returned. She goes to the hospital for a biopsy. When Lyn tries to take control, Toadie suggests to Steph that they get married. Steph notices how upset Toadie is after he learns that his former girlfriend, Sonya (Eve Morey), is leaving. Steph tells Sonya to stay and reveals the truth about the wedding and the baby. Steph discovers that Dan has been involved in an accident and tells him about the baby. Paul Robinson (Stefan Dennis) records the conversation and plays it at Charlie's, just as Libby walks in. Libby is devastated and tells Steph to stay away from her. During an argument, Steph collapses from high blood pressure. She decides to stay with her father for a while and she gives birth to a baby boy. Steph hands the baby over to Dan, who names him Adam.

Steph runs into Woody and they catch up. Lyn worries that Steph is suffering from post-natal depression and tries to stage an intervention. Libby goes to find her and they talk, but Steph becomes angry and leaves on her motorbike. She hits Ringo Brown (Sam Clark) and he dies. Steph is charged with driving in a dangerous manner, driving under the influence of alcohol and culpable driving. Charlie goes missing during Halloween and he is found by Samantha Fitzgerald (Simone Buchanan). Sam reveals that she is the prosecutor for Steph's case. Toadie becomes her lawyer and she asks him to keep her out of jail and to arrange joint custody of Adam. The jury find Steph guilty. Lucas asks Steph to run away with him, but she turns him down. She is sentenced to six years in prison, with a minimum non-parole period of two years. Steph is later moved to a low security prison in Bendigo.

Upon her release two and a half years later, Steph returns to Erinsborough to take over as manager of Harold's Store. Steph reconnects with Lucas and meets his partner, Vanessa. Steph reveals that Charlie is with Max in Fiji, after he won full custody. Steph meets with Sergeant Matt Turner to discuss her parole and psychiatrist appointments. He asks her why she was initially turned down for parole and Steph tells him that she was not ready. It later emerges that she suffered a breakdown and is on medication. When she learns that Lucas has cancer, Steph supports him and encourages Lucas to keep the news from Vanessa. Steph tells Toadie that she will never forgive him for botching her defence causing her to lose everything she had. Steph moves in with Karl and Susan. She tries to win Lucas back by causing tension within his relationship. Steph learns that Vanessa was once married and Lucas does not know, so she sends him a message pretending to be Vanessa's ex-husband. Lucas calls off his wedding to Vanessa. Steph stops taking her medication and suffers a psychotic break. She kidnaps Lucas and Vanessa's son, Patrick, believing that he is Adam. Lucas manages to talk Steph into handing Patrick back and she is arrested. After receiving treatment, Steph feels guilty about what she has done. She apologises to Lucas, Vanessa and Toadie, before she is formally charged and taken away.

Steph returns to Erinsborough to apply for a job at the garage, initially unaware that Lucas has repurchased it. She is interviewed by Tyler Brennan (Travis Burns), who offers her the job after a trial. Steph helps Amy Williams (Zoe Cramond) carry some timber and they bond over lunch. Karl stops by the garage and upon seeing Steph, he tells Tyler that she used to work there. Steph reveals that she is on day release from a psychiatric hospital and that a change in medication means she is unlikely to suffer another psychotic break. She visits Toadie, who is now in a wheelchair, and they agree to support each other. Lucas returns to confront Steph. He agrees to give her a three-month trial at the garage, and asks that she does not contact him or Vanessa directly. Steph tells Toadie that she needs to prove to Max that she is better, so she can see Charlie again. Steph befriends Amy's young son Jimmy (Darcy Tadich) and when he goes missing, she finds him at the school. When she goes to call Amy, Steph is arrested for kidnap, until Jimmy admits that she tried to help him. Steph runs into Belinda Bell, who expresses her worry about Steph being back in Erinsborough. When Steph gets a pass from the hospital to attend a sleep-out protest at Erinsborough High, Belinda talks to Toadie about her worries and he tells Steph not to stay. She later sees the school on fire and helps Sonya to pull Toadie out of the building. When a Fitzgerald Motors jerry can is found at the scene, Steph becomes a suspect and is questioned by Mark Brennan, but a mobile phone call gives her an alibi.

Toadie sees Steph and Belinda kissing and Steph reveals that Belinda was her nurse and that they were in a relationship. Steph catches Belinda going through her bag to find her medication and they argue. Steph opens up to Amy about her condition and how she used to hear "Greensleeves" before an episode. She begins to hear the music at the garage and later receives a phone call from a child, who she believes is Charlie. Vanessa agrees to meet with Steph, but her behaviour following the phone call worries Vanessa. She and Lucas end Steph's trial at the garage. Toadie finds a speaker at the garage and realises that somebody is trying to make Steph think she is having an episode. After taking her medication, Steph starts to suffer hallucinations and believes she is having a relapse. Paul offers to drive her to her doctor in Bendigo. During the drive, Steph receives a text telling her that Paul has switched her medication. Before she can confront him, they crash after Paul swerves to avoid another car. Steph finds the drugs in his pocket and refuses to help him until he explains his actions. Paul tells her that he has been trying to trigger a relapse so she will leave Erinsborough, as he is worried she will harm Jimmy. Steph tapes his confession and admits that she already called an ambulance. At the hospital, Steph tells Paul that she will keep his secret if he gives her a job at The Waterhole. Sonya also invites Steph to move in with her and Toadie. Steph tells Belinda that they will never get back together, as she knows Belinda gave Paul details about her condition. Belinda leaves town as she finds it hard to be around Steph.

Max's wife, Philippa (Wendy Bos) tells Steph that she is planning to adopt Charlie. Lyn visits to offer her support. After learning she has some shares worth $70,000, Steph goes into business with Paul and they purchase a local motel. Lyn brings Charlie to Erinsborough, but Toadie warns Steph that she could jeopardise her chance of custody if she has any contact with him. Charlie learns where Steph is and comes to see her. She explains to him that she has been very ill and did not want him to see her that way. She also gives him some letters she wrote to him, but never posted. Charlie later returns on his own and they spend the day together, until Philippa arrives to take him home, having tracked his phone. Philippa tries to get Steph to sign the consent forms for the adoption, but Steph rips them up. On the first day of mediation, Steph runs out of medication and heatstroke causes a relapse. Charlie tells Steph that he does not want to see her again. Steph spends the day with Mark and some of her old biker friends. She and Mark later kiss, but agree that they should remain friends. At a second mediation hearing, Phillippa calls Lucas as a witness, but Lucas is sympathetic to Steph, and Phillippa agrees to allow Steph shared custody. Paul is blamed following an explosion at Lassiter's, but Steph believes he is innocent and agrees to help him clear his name, causing problems in her relationship with Mark, who believes Paul is guilty.

Steph tells Mark that she cannot have another child due to her mental health. When Charlie returns to Fiji, Steph decides not to contest custody. She and Mark are saddened by Charlie's absence, and Sonya offers to be their surrogate, but they reject her offer. Steph arranges to meet Adam (Archie Campbell), her son with Dan, and Lucas brings him to Erinsborough. Steph is hospitalised after she crashes her motorbike. She and Mark accept Sonya's offer to be their surrogate. Steph, Mark, Toadie and Sonya meet with Victoria Lamb (Claudia Greenstone), a consultant, to discuss their feelings about the surrogacy. Victoria later informs Steph and Mark that Steph has low ovarian reserves. She urges them to think about whether they want to continue, and Steph breaks up with Mark. They later make up and agree to try one round of IVF, but Victoria informs them that they were not able to collect any viable eggs, ending their chance of conceiving a child together. Sonya then offers to be an egg donor and Steph agrees. The fertilisation goes ahead, but when Victoria and Paul warn Steph that Sonya might become attached to the baby, she asks Mark and Sonya to end the process. Steph also asks Sonya to take the morning-after pill, but she refuses. Mark proposes to Steph and she accepts. Sonya announces she is pregnant. Mark starts to spend more time around Sonya, which makes Steph feel left out. She forms a close relationship with Victoria, who develops feelings for Steph and later kisses her. Steph ends her relationship with Mark when she kisses Victoria. Steph's motorbike is damaged and she initially suspects Victoria's daughter Josie Lamb (Madison Daniel), who warns her to stay away from her mother. Steph soon learns that Victoria's former partner Ellen Crabb (Louise Crawford) was responsible. She and Victoria end their relationship.

Steph works with Jack Callahan (Andrew James Morley) on an application for the Most Liveable Suburb competition. After a night out, they kiss. They initially agree to a casual relationship. While looking after his son Gabriel Smith (Kian Bafekrpour), Steph has a flashback to the time she kidnapped Patrick and she thinks she hears Gabe call her "mama". David Tanaka (Takaya Honda) suggests that she might be fatigued or her medication needs adjusting, but she later learns she is drinking too much caffeine. Paige asks Steph to stay away from Gabe, but changes her mind after they bond while stuck in a lift together. Steph takes Adam out for the afternoon, but has to rescue him when he wanders off and is almost hit by a car. Steph decides to buy Paul and Leo Tanaka's (Tim Kano) share of the motel to open a cancer wellness centre with Amy. Steph and Amy struggle to attract donors for the centre, but Amy suddenly announces that an anonymous donor has given them the money they need to finish the motel's conversion. Steph soon learns the donor is Lyn, and tells Amy that she is no longer part of the wellness centre, as Steph cannot trust her. The wellness centre is renamed the Flame Tree Retreat and with Lyn's help, the launch is a success. Steph leaves Amy in charge when she decides to spend Christmas with Lyn, who admits to feeling lonely without her children around.

Upon her return, Steph tells Jack that she loves him. The couple win a glamping competition in a raffle, along with Paige and Mark, who are staying at the same site. Steph overhears Paige and Jack talking about their one-night stand and she breaks up with Jack. She refuses to accept his apology and later vandalises his room at the Backpackers'. Steph admits to trashing the room and her travel visa to Fiji is revoked, meaning she cannot see Charlie. Steph spends time with Ben helping to do up Drew's old car, and she later takes him to Oakey to visit Drew's family. Steph starts to feel that her life is too empty, so she decides to move to Sydney to be closer to Adam. She agrees to let Gary manage the retreat in her absence. During a visit from Charlie, Steph learns that Philippa is having an affair and asked Charlie to keep it from Max. Steph suggests that Philippa returns to Fiji to sort out her marriage, while Charlie stays in Erinsborough with her. Steph falls out with Toadie when a drafted legal letter about joint custody is sent to Max. Philippa returns to collect Charlie, but Sonya intervenes and Philippa agrees to let Charlie stay with Steph while she sorts out her marriage. Steph is disappointed that Toadie is not around to say goodbye. However, he soon turns up with Adam and explains that he flew up to Sydney to collect him, so Steph, Charlie and Adam can drive back together. Steph thanks Toadie and Sonya for all their help and they say goodbye, before she drives herself and her boys out of Erinsborough.

Four years later, Steph sends Toadie a video message congratulating him at his wedding to Melanie Pearson (Lucinda Cowden).

== Other appearances ==
To coincide with the character's return to Neighbours in April 2013, the serial released six webisodes that feature Steph talking to a psychiatrist (Trudy Hellier) before her release from jail. Steph talks about a variety of issues and explains that there is someone in Erinsborough that she is going back for. The webisodes also provide an insight into Steph's actions upon her return. The webisodes were directed by Bonner's co-star Scott Major. He told a writer for Channel 5's Neighbours website that being part of Steph's exit storyline did not influence his approach to directing the webisodes. Major stated that he shot the webisodes differently from Neighbours, to show what it is like in Steph's head. He explained "I wanted viewers to be a little uncomfortable, make them feel they were intruding on these private conversations."

== Reception ==
In June 2002, Steph came first in a poll run by Newsround to find viewers' favourite Neighbours character. She received 34.85% of the vote. At the 2008 Inside Soap Awards, Bonner earned a nomination for Best Actress and the storyline that saw Steph getting jilted at the altar by Toadie was nominated for Best Storyline. The following year, Bonner was nominated for "Sexiest Female". The episode in which Steph and Toadie fabricate a reconciliation to cover story up Steph's infidelity won the Australian Director's Guild Award in 2010. That same year saw Steph voted viewers favourite Neighbours character in a survey carried out by website Yahoo!. Yahoo!'s TV editor, Paul Johnston said: "Steph has beaten some classic soap favourites to take the lead spot as the nation's favourite Neighbours character". Johnston also added "By witnessing her develop from the tomboy with a passion for motorbikes to a loving mother she has been a regular in people's living rooms for over a decade".

Jackie Brygel of the Herald Sun branded the character "she who is perennially unlucky in love". Another reporter for the Herald Sun placed Steph's discovery of her fiancé and sister's affair at number four on their list of Neighbours Top Ten moments. They said "Steph and Marc had a quick engagement, but in the meantime Marc fell in love with Flick. Flick tried but couldn't hide the fact that she also loved her sister's betrothed. Steph and Marc made it all the way to the altar, but after she said "I do", he replied: "I can't, I'm in love with your sister." Priceless". Robin Oliver writing for The Sydney Morning Herald said he was compelled to watch Steph and Max's wedding, because it was twenty minutes of "good fun". In a feature by Virgin Media dedicated to television "yummy mummies", Steph was placed fifth on the list. Virgin Media said "After several ups and downs and a battle with illness, Neighbours' glam mummy Steph (played by Carla Bonner), gave birth to baby Charlie in 2006".

Ruth Deller of television website Lowculture was negative towards the character, saying "She used to be awesome, way back when the Scully family arrived, but the departure of her whole family, her not-that-convincing relationships with Max and Toadie and her lack of useful storylines have meant she’s felt like a spare part on the street for ages". In July 2010, Deller placed Steph at number five on her list of worst characters of the last seven months. She said "Steph's decline over the past few years has been pretty heartbreaking for those of us who remember the sassy, pretty, smart young woman that she was when the Scully family first arrived on Ramsay Street. Since then, she's had a tedious love life, been miraculously cured of cancer (which in true Neighbours-style could definitely return if she had a baby and could then definitely return again if she had an abortion), been ruined by marriage to the insufferable Max Hoyland (who we still haven't forgiven for murdering CamRob), had an unbelievable romance with best mate Toadie and an even more unbelievable friendship with Libby (when clearly the characters hate each other, and it's more of a 'frenemy' thing)".

In April 2013, a Newcastle Herald reporter commented "As independent Steph Scully, Bonner was a fan favourite, leaving a gaping hole when she was bundled off to jail." They continued that Toadie should watch out because Steph has "a bone to pick with him about how he represented her in court." Ben Pobjie of The Sydney Morning Herald praised the character, saying she was the Scully sister "who most won our hearts". Pobjie enjoyed her 2015 return scenes, commenting

So Steph is back, and she is back in the classic style in which we demand all our soap opera favourites return to the fold: a close-up shot of unidentified boots dismounting a motorbike. The scene truly is a classic of the genre, and actress Carla Bonner proves herself a formidable performer from the knees down. Not that there's anything wrong with her from the knees up, of course: indeed, when that familiar face is revealed, all Neighbours' fans will be overwhelmed with the ineffable Stephness of it all."

A Sunday Mail contributor later observed "Steph's return to Erinsborough hasn't been a happy one." Melinda Houston, writing for The Sydney Morning Herald, called Steph "one of the suburbs' more interesting villains" due to her history as a "drunkard, murderer, kidnapper and psychotic". However, Houston pointed out that those events were not really Steph's fault and added "there's no question she's about to liven things up." A TVNZ included Steph in their list of the top 30 Neighbours' characters, and stated "Steph made her mark as a tomboy with a zest for life. Heartache and loss saw her lose her fun-loving attitude, but she managed to regain it." Steph was placed at number eighteen on the Huffpost's "35 greatest Neighbours characters of all time" feature. Journalist Adam Beresford described her as "a big fan favourite", "the coolest biker chick to ever rev up Ramsay Street" and assessed that she had a "torrid time" during her storylines. Owing to her mental health issues and fluid sexuality, Beresford believed that Steph was one of "the most intriguingly complex characters the show has ever had". In 2015, a Herald Sun reporter included Steph and Libby's bike accident in their "Neighbours' 30 most memorable moments" feature.
