= Carla Bonner =

Australian actress (born 1973)

- Born: 3 March 1973 (age 53); Melbourne, Victoria, Australia
- Occupation: Actress
- Years active: 1990–present
- Known for: Neighbours as Stephanie Scully
- Children: 2

Carla Bonner (born 3 March 1973) is an Australian actress, best known for playing the role of Stephanie Scully in the Australian soap opera drama Neighbours, a role she played from 1999 to 2010. She was also a guest on Celebrity Big Brother Australia in 2002. Following her departure from Neighbours, Bonner wrote a book called Hook, Line and Sink Her and guest starred in an episode of Wentworth. She briefly reprised the role of Steph in 2013, before returning to Neighbours as a permanent cast member from October 2015 until June 2018. She briefly reprised the role in July 2022.

== Career ==
Bonner attended the Australian College of the Arts. Prior to landing her role on Neighbours, Bonner's acting experience was confined to television commercials, corporate videos, and bit parts, including a guest role on Raw FM. When Emma Roche unexpectedly quit the role of Stephanie Scully in Neighbours, Bonner auditioned for the part and was immediately cast as Steph.

On 3 June 2010, it was announced that Bonner had quit Neighbours after eleven years. The character of Stephanie was not killed off, leaving the door open for a potential return. The show's executive producer, Susan Bower, said "The storylines on-air and coming up showcase what an exceptional talent Carla is and while fans will be disappointed, I promise Steph's farewell will be long remembered and will do the character proud."

In 2012, Bonner wrote and published a dating book for men called Hook, Line and Sink Her. That same year, it was announced that Bonner would be returning to Neighbours for two months. The actress began filming her scenes in January 2013 and she made her on-screen return as Steph on 15 April 2013. Bonner portrayed Manda Katsis in episode four of Wentworth. On 10 September 2013, it was announced that Bonner had teamed up with writer and producer Gary O'Toole to develop a 12-part television series based on Hook, Line and Sink Her.

Bonner appeared in the ABC3 teen drama Ready for This in 2015. In July of that year, it was announced Bonner had returned to Neighbours as Steph. She appeared on-screen from October. In May 2018, it was confirmed that Bonner had left the show. That same year, she filmed a role in the ABC Comedy series Superwog.

== Personal life ==
Bonner lives in Perth, Western Australia. She has two sons Harley Bonner and Jhye. Harley joined the cast of Neighbours in 2013 as Josh Willis.

Bonner is good friends with Kym Valentine, who played Libby Kennedy in Neighbours. Bonner's character and Valentine's character were also best friends.

In 2007 Bonner was involved in a car accident and was charged with "unlicensed driving" amongst other offences. She was convicted and fined $1,000.

== Filmography ==
Year	Title	Role	Notes
1996	Mr Nice Guy	Cameo	Feature film
1996	Raw FM	Erin	Episode: "Cara"
1999–2010, 2013, 2015–2018, 2022	Neighbours	Stephanie Scully	Main cast
2002	Celebrity Big Brother Australia	Contestant	
2013	Wentworth	Manda Katsis	Episode: "The Things We Do"
2015	Ready for This	Coach Beaton	
2016	The Agent	Jo	5 episodes
2018	Superwog	Foster Mum	Episode: "Breaking Dad"
2023	The Claremont Murders	Living Witness	Miniseries, 1 episode
2023	Celebrity House Cleaner	Thommie	4 episodes
TBA	Patched	Ruth	Pre-production
TBA	The Wonderful World of Nancy Nancy	Carolyn	Post-production
