= Troy Miller (Neighbours) =

Fictional character from the Australian soap opera Neighbours

- Neighbours character
- Portrayed by: Dieter Brummer
- Duration: 2011–2012
- First appearance: 10 May 2011
- Last appearance: 3 July 2012
- Introduced by: Susan Bower (2011); Richard Jasek (2012)
In-universe information
- Occupation: Soldier
- Sons: Callum Rebecchi

Troy Miller is a fictional character from the Australian soap opera Neighbours, played by Dieter Brummer. The actor relocated to Melbourne to film his scenes and his casting was announced in March 2011. He had a seven-week guest contract. Brummer revealed that his turn in Underbelly: A Tale of Two Cities caught the attention of the Neighbours producers and they later offered him the role of Troy. He also stated that the part made him enjoy acting again, after being away from the industry for several years. Brummer made his first appearance as Troy during the episode broadcast on 10 May.

Before his arrival on screen, it was revealed Troy was Sonya Mitchell's (Eve Morey) ex-boyfriend and the biological father of Callum Jones (Morgan Baker). Troy is an ex-army officer and a complex character. He initially appears nice on the surface, but there is a dark side to him. Brummer revealed that Troy does not intentionally set out to stir up trouble, but aspects of his personality often cause problems. He later stated that Troy knows how to push people to his advantage. Troy comes to Erinsborough after being contacted by Toadfish Rebecchi (Ryan Moloney). He discovers Callum is his son and sets about getting to know him better. He also becomes keen to get back together with Sonya.

Troy departed on 8 June 2011 after failing to convince Sonya to start a new life with him. In March 2012, it was announced that Brummer had reprised his role for six weeks. The actor revealed that it took twelve months to come up with the storyline and get him back. Troy purchases a house on Ramsay Street and Brummer stated that he just wants to be a part of Callum's life. Shortly after the character's return, it was revealed that he was Jade Mitchell's (Gemma Pranita) abusive ex-boyfriend. In June 2012, a two-week-long storyline unfolded in which Troy took Callum, Sonya and Jade hostage, before being badly injured. The character died from a head injury on 3 July 2012, following a dramatic confrontation with his son.

== Casting ==
On 1 March 2011, a writer for Channel 5's Neighbours website announced Brummer had been cast in the role of Captain Troy Miller. The actor relocated from Sydney to Melbourne, where Neighbours is filmed, for his seven-week guest stint on the soap. Brummer began filming his first scenes the day after his casting was announced. Inside Soap's Jason Herbison revealed Brummer's appearance in Underbelly: A Tale of Two Cities attracted the attentions of the Neighbours producers and they later offered him the role of Troy. The actor told Herbison that he was "chuffed" when he received the offer and that he was enjoying acting again, after being away from the acting industry for a while. Brummer added his Neighbours role allowed him the opportunity to work alongside his friend, Scott Major (Lucas Fitzgerald). Of Brummer's casting, the show's executive producer Susan Bower commented "We are delighted that Dieter is joining us and we're very excited about the character he is playing. The Captain will certainly leave his mark on Ramsay Street." Brummer made his debut screen appearance as Troy on 10 May 2011.

== Development ==
=== Backstory and characterisation ===
Troy is Sonya Mitchell's (Eve Morey) ex-boyfriend and the biological father of Callum Jones (Morgan Baker). Brummer revealed that when Troy and Sonya were together, they were going through a dark time in their lives. Explaining Troy and Sonya's relationship further, Brummer stated "I think he would have been more dedicated to Sonya and their relationship in the past if he'd known that she decided to keep their baby. He has never really let go of Sonya. For whatever reason they finally decided to break up and neither one of them was in a great place at the time. Then he left to join the army." The actor believed that it was not easy for the former couple to confront their past.

"Since he's come back to Ramsay Street, he's been a very smug character who knows exactly what he wants to do. He's playing everyone just the way he wants, often with a smile on his face."

— Brummer on Troy's return (2012)

Brummer commented that Troy had been through many changes since his relationship with Sonya. Speaking to a Channel 5 website reporter, the actor said Troy stands up for himself, though "he will turn like a cut snake if he's crossed." Brummer called Troy "a complex character", who initially appears nice on the surface. However, there is another side to him. A writer for Channel 5 observed that not everyone in Erinsborough would be ready to welcome Troy. They described him as a "sexy soldier", who was guaranteed to see a lot of heavy combat during his time on the show. Brummer told a TV Week reporter that Troy does not intentionally set out to stir up trouble, but aspects of his personality would cause problems.

When asked by a What's on TV journalist if Troy has a nice side, Brummer stated "That's an interesting question. His intentions are good from the point-of-view that he wants to be with his son, Callum. However, there is some really bad, dark stuff going on with Troy and that overrides any of his positive motives." The actor thought Troy would be a good father to Callum, but only if it was just them together. Speaking about his second stint in Neighbours, Brummer revealed that Troy is "a great strategist", who knows how to push people to his advantage. He later said "When we first saw Troy last year he wasn't aware that he fathered a child to Sonya and after things went a little bit awry towards the end of last year's stint, he'd gone away and spent a bit of time thinking about it and came back."

=== Introduction ===
Troy comes to Erinsborough after being contacted by Toadfish Rebecchi (Ryan Moloney). Toadie reveals that he wants to know if Sonya is hiding anything else from him, having just learned she is the mother of his adoptive son, Callum. Troy subsequently learns he is Callum's biological father and Toadie begins to see him as a threat, which Brummer thought was to be expected. Moloney compared the two men to a pair of bulls eyeing each other up and waiting to see who charges first. Aware that her relationship with Toadie has broken down, Troy becomes keen to get back together with her. Troy and Sonya share a kiss, which is witnessed by Callum. Moloney told an Inside Soap writer that "in a way Toadie paved the way for Troy to come back into Sonya's life - and it looks like he's going to regret that." Just as Toadie learns about the kiss, his friend Harold Bishop (Ian Smith), reveals that he also witnessed Troy and Sonya kissing earlier in the week. Moloney thought that if Sonya and Troy did get back together, then there would be "a ready-made family" waiting for Callum. Toadie gives Sonya his blessing to move on with Troy, but he later realises that he wants to win her back.

Troy reveals his "true colours" when he attends Harold's stag do. He threatens Harold into staying out of his way, by shoving him to one side. Shortly after that incident, Toadie becomes worried when he learns Troy has taken Callum to Puckapunyal. He cannot get a hold of him and the situation briefly brings Toadie and Sonya together. When Troy returns, it is revealed that it was Callum's fault. Moloney told a Channel 5 reporter that Toadie then has a go at Troy, which pushes him and Sonya apart. Following Harold's wedding, Toadie and Sonya decide to get back together. Troy initially takes the news well, but after running into Sonya's sister, Jade (Gemma Pranita), who provokes him with some "choice words", he snaps. Troy lashes out by punching Toadie and shouting at his son, terrifying him. Troy eventually calms down and feeling remorseful, he contacts Sonya, who agrees to meet him in his hotel room. TV Week's Jackie Brygel and Gavin Scott wrote that it soon becomes clear Troy is still angry, when he refuses to let Sonya leave. Troy tries unsuccessfully to convince her to start a new life with him and he leaves alone.

=== Return ===
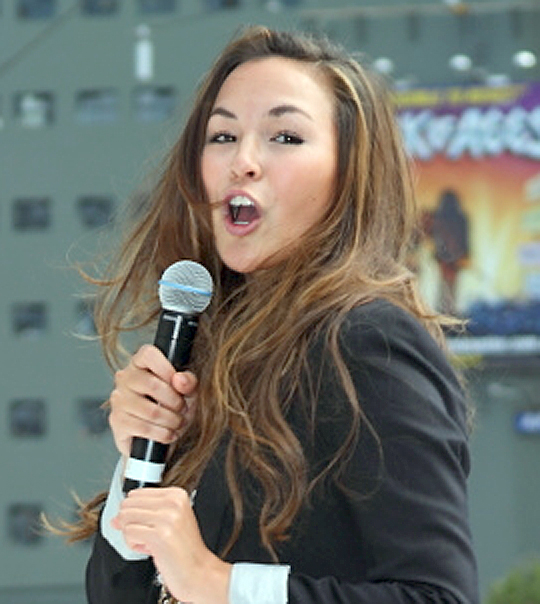
Following Troy's return, it was revealed he had dated and abused Jade Mitchell (played by Gemma Pranita).

On 2 March 2012, it was announced that Brummer had reprised his role for a six-week stint. Daniel Kilkelly of Digital Spy confirmed the actor was already back on set filming, but details of his comeback storyline were being kept under wraps. A Neighbours spokesperson told Kilkelly that Troy's return would "certainly ruffle feathers in Erinsborough." Brummer commented that he was enjoying being back in Melbourne and that the cast had made him feel at home. Speaking to Seanna Cronin of the Sunshine Coast Daily about his return, Brummer revealed "I did the seven-week guestie last year and there was talk about it. It seemed fairly well open. It took 12 months for them to come up with the storyline and bring me back, I had a feeling I'd be back at some point, I was just not sure when." Brummer made a return to Neighbours on 28 May 2012.

A Channel 5 website writer said Troy's return storyline was expected to be one of the most dramatic for 2012. Brummer revealed that Troy comes back to be a part of Callum's life, but the way he goes about it does not sit well with some of the residents of Ramsay Street. He purchases Number 32, the house next door to Sonya and Toadie, thinking it could be a way to get closer to his son. Brummer explained to an Inside Soap journalist that Troy insists he is a changed man as he has been through anger management and plans to turn his life around. When Toadie learns Troy is back, he invites him to a meeting in his office, without telling Sonya. He makes it clear to Troy that he does not trust him and he will not be allowed near Callum. Sonya learns Troy is back after Callum lets it slip and she is annoyed that Toadie withheld the news from her. Troy's return causes tension between them. Brummer commented that Sonya does not believe her ex has changed and she warns him to stay away from her son. Troy then announces that he is going to fight Sonya for joint custody of Callum. The actor added Sonya and Toadie are "left in no doubt about his determination" when they discover he has hired their friend Ajay Kapoor (Sachin Joab) to represent him.

Andrew Mercado of TV Week observed Sonya, Toadie and Callum were not the only characters reeling from the news that Troy is back – with Jade also seemingly horrified at his return. In "an explosive development", it was revealed Troy was Jade's abusive ex-boyfriend who she had mentioned in past discussions with her partner, Kyle Canning (Chris Milligan). Following a confrontation between Toadie and Troy, a pregnant Sonya collapses putting her unborn child's life at risk. Morey commented that she was stressed out just reading the scripts for the scenes. Toadie loses control and punches Troy when he taunts him about Sonya's pregnancy. Troy immediately goes to the police and takes out a restraining order against Toadie. Morey told TV Week's Jackie Brygel and Gavin Scott "Sonya sees Troy as the devil incarnate - a man who has only ever wanted harmful things to happen to her. He really epitomises the blackness of Sonya's past and he's affecting everyone she loves." When she hears the news of the order against Toadie, Sonya's body shuts down because of the amount of stress she is under and she collapses. Later at the hospital, Sonya is given the all-clear.

=== Siege and departure ===
In June 2012, a TV Week reporter revealed Troy would take Callum, Sonya and Jade hostage inside his house during a storyline set to play out over two weeks. The reporter explained one of the characters would be left fighting for their life following the "must-see episodes". Morey commented "The stakes get higher and higher every single second. The storyline takes us down this incredible path where you think the situation is bad...but just wait! Give it another five seconds and it'll get much worse." The storyline starts to unfold after Callum confronts Troy about reneging on a deal to have an intervention order against Toadie dropped. Brummer stated that Troy just wants to be back in his son's life, but everyone is making that difficult for him and because no one trusts him, Troy locks Callum inside his house. He refuses to let his son go until his views are heard. Sonya and Jade realise what has happened and they "have never been more fearful", especially as they know the truth about Troy's history of physical abuse.

Morey said that Sonya feels powerless in that moment and when Callum fails to escape, she and Jade burst into the house. Pranita explained that Jade takes on a "protective auntie role" of looking after Callum. She feels like history is repeating itself and Jade hates Troy more than ever. Of shooting the siege storyline, Pranita told the reporter "It was so out of the norm to the drama that we shoot day to day. This was a really heightened scenario where you're being held captive in a house against your will, while trying to protect your family. It was so intense and we felt like we had a dark cloud hanging over us for a few weeks." Pranita added that Brummer's acting made it easy to be scared of Troy. The TV Week reporter wrote that "Neighbours takes a leaf out of Desperate Housewives' book" when a twist leaves one character severely injured. Morey revealed that where the storyline goes is devastating, dramatic and very sad.

Brummer later told Mercado that things would take a shocking turn in the storyline, which leads to Troy's departure from the soap. Troy is taken to the hospital after he hits his head during an altercation with Jade, but he discharges himself and heads to Erinsborough High to see Callum. Morey revealed that Sonya and Toadie are "beside themselves" when they hear Troy has tried to break into the school. She explained "Sonya is absolutely panicked. The thing she's always feared most is Troy doing something to Callum, and now she's terrified he's going to take Callum away, whether Callum likes it or not." A dramatic confrontation erupts in the school and Morey called the scenes "uncomfortable to film" as they were shooting in a part of the studio they are never in. Callum eventually lashes out at Troy and tells him he does not want to see him ever again. The police start to close in and Troy tries to escape in his car. However he loses consciousness, crashes and never wakes up. Troy's final scenes were broadcast on 3 July 2012.

== Storylines ==
Troy arrives in Erinsborough looking for Toadfish Rebecchi. He asks Kate Ramsay (Ashleigh Brewer) if she knows where to find him and they are overheard by Harold Bishop, who takes Troy's phone number to give to Toadie. Troy later goes to Harold's Store and hears Kate and Lucas Fitzgerald (Scott Major) talking about Sonya Mitchell. Troy asks Lucas for Sonya's address and he surprises her by showing up at her door. Troy tells Sonya and her sister, Jade, that a lawyer called his base a few weeks ago and Sonya's name was mentioned. Troy suddenly remembers Sonya was pregnant when they separated and Sonya admits that she gave birth to their son, Callum. She explains that she did not tell him because he had walked out on her. Troy tells Sonya he has changed since he joined the army and was posted to Afghanistan. He asks to see Callum and a meeting is arranged at Harold's Store. Troy and Callum get on well, but Toadie cuts the meeting short. He later allows Callum to spend the day with Troy. Sonya and Troy reminisce about their past and they later kiss. Harold asks Troy what his intentions towards Sonya are and Carolyn Johnstone (Paula Duncan) offers him money to leave, but Troy states that he just wants to get to know Callum.

Troy is invited to Harold's bucks night and he physically threatens Harold, when they are alone. Toadie becomes angry with Troy when he takes Callum to Puckapunyal without permission. Troy explains Callum had sneaked into the back of his car and he did not notice until he stopped for petrol. Troy promises Sonya he will not take off with Callum without permission. Sonya tells Troy she and Toadie have resumed their relationship, which angers him. Jade then goads him and Troy confronts Toadie; punching him in the face. Troy also yells at Callum. Sonya visits Troy at his hotel and he explains that he wants to be a family with her and Callum. Sonya tells him it cannot happen and Troy stops her from leaving. Troy worries that he is going to be shut out of Callum's life, but Sonya reassures him that will not happen and they can arrange to meet next time he is on leave. Troy then reveals that he has been dishonorably discharged from the army. Troy tries to make Sonya have an emotional breakdown, by telling her that Toadie will not accept her. He tempts her with a glass of whiskey, but she states that if he loved her, he would not have done that. Sonya tells him to stay away from her family and she leaves the room. Troy departs Erinsborough alone.

A year later, Troy returns and purchases Number 32. Rani Kapoor (Coco Cherian) introduces herself to him and when she mentions she is friends with Callum and his family, Troy tells her he knows the family well. Troy goes to Sonya's Nursery and watches Callum and Sonya working. He later returns home to find Toadie and Callum on his driveway. He states that he just wants to be a part of Callum's life. Toadie offers to buy the house, telling Troy that Callum is afraid of him. Troy explains that he is a changed man after attending anger management classes. Sonya learns Troy has returned and tells him to stay away. Troy then hires Ajay Kapoor to gain access to Callum. Jade confronts Troy about his return, revealing their past relationship in the process. Troy learns Sonya is pregnant and goads Toadie about the child's paternity. When Toadie punches him, Troy calls the police and Toadie is served with an intervention order, which forces him to leave the street. Jade later comes to Troy and reveals she has medical records, proving he hit her when they were together. Jade gives her evidence at the mediation meeting, but Ajay reveals that there is nothing that will alter Troy's application for custody.

Troy realises Toadie has broken the intervention order and calls the police. Callum comes to Troy and states that he will spend time with him if he drops the custody case and the intervention order. Troy agrees and he and Callum work on the house renovations. Troy drops the custody case, but reveals he will not drop the order against Toadie until he is sure Callum will keep to the deal. Troy prevents Callum from leaving his house as he wants his son to hear him out. Sonya becomes concerned for Callum and when the door opens, Jade manages to push him out of the house. However, Troy locks the sisters inside and pushes Jade to the floor when she defends Sonya. Troy starts shouting and explains that all he wanted to do was get to know his son. Jade punches him in the stomach and she and Sonya escape. As he chases them, Troy trips and falls, accidentally pulling down a toolbox on top of him. Toadie finds him unconscious, but while he is outside, Troy wakes up and disappears. He goes to the Lassiter's Complex looking for Ajay and collapses. He is taken to the hospital, where he tells Rhys Lawson (Ben Barber) that Jade and Sonya attacked him. He is then placed in an induced coma.

When Troy wakes up, he gives a statement to the police confirming that he tripped and Jade was not responsible for his injuries. Ajay tells him that he is no longer his lawyer and Toadie comes to visit, telling him that nothing has changed. Troy discharges himself and goes to Ramsay Street to pack up his stuff. He then heads to the high school to pick up Callum, but Priya Kapoor (Menik Gooneratne) sends him away. However, Troy returns and breaks into the school. He struggles with his head injury, but begins searching the school for Callum. Toadie tells him to stop, but Troy refuses, until Callum tells him to leave. Troy gets in his truck, but collapses at the wheel and dies.

== Reception ==
A Liverpool Daily Post reporter said Troy was a "troubled character". The Sunday Mercury's Roz Laws questioned if Troy was the right man for Sonya, adding "Not if his nasty behaviour at Harold's stag party is anything to go by." A writer for TV Week's online website branded Troy a "menacing ex" and said his return was "most unwelcome". A reporter for the Herald Sun called him a "baddie". Andrew Kerby of Only Soaps labelled Troy "the archetypal Neighbours nasty". He stated "Great news to have Dieter back because he plays the character with such verve and passion, but just what is Troy doing coming back? Wait and see – we're sure it is going to be a bumpy ride!" A What's on TV reporter labelled Troy a "trouble-maker supreme" and "Ramsay Street's nastiest neighbour!" Digital Spy's Paul Millar called Troy "evil". Seanna Cronin of the Sunshine Coast Daily wrote "After daring to rough up Ramsay Street icon Harold Bishop before fleeing town last year, it's doubtful Miller will be able to win over Erinsborough's residents this time around."

Laura Morgan from All About Soap wrote that Troy is "nasty", "crazy", "manipulative" and "unhinged". She observed that if his first stint in the soap was anything to go by, then his return would create much drama. Morgan added "And if you ask us, Troy's still in love with Sonya, so we wouldn't put it past him to have some trick up his sleeve to split her and Toadie up for good. He'd better not, or he'll have us to answer to!" Morgan's colleague Claire Crick later stated "Neighbours' Troy Miller has all the elements a proper soap baddie needs, but today he stooped to a new low when he revealed that not only did he once turn heavy-handed with Jade, but worse still – he seems almost proud of it!" Dianne Butler, writing for News.com.au, said "It's hard to completely dislike Troy despite the plague he's delivered on Ramsay St - not when he almost knocks Paul Robinson off his stool just for trying to get all alpha male on him." Butler agreed with Jade when she told Troy that he was not going to be hanging around much longer, saying "Neighbours can't have Dieter Brummer in it, under-emoting while those hysterical teens scream at him. He's too talented."
