= Mark Brennan (Neighbours) =

Fictional character from the Australian television soap opera Neighbours

- Neighbours character
- Portrayed by: Scott McGregor
- Duration: 2010–2011, 2013–2020
- First appearance: 30 August 2010
- Last appearance: 20 April 2020
- Introduced by: Susan Bower (2010); Richard Jasek (2013); Jason Herbison (2020)
- Spin-off appearances: Brennan on the Run (2014)
In-universe information
- Other names: Matt Smith
- Occupation: Detective; Mechanic; Police constable
- Father: Russell Brennan
- Mother: Fay Brennan
- Brothers: Aaron Brennan
- Sisters: Chloe Brennan
- Half-brothers: Tyler Brennan
- Wife: Elly Conway (2019); Paige Smith (2020–)
- Sons: Freddie
- Daughters: Caitlin Brennan (miscarried)
- Stepsons: Gabriel Smith

Mark Brennan (also referred to as just Brennan) is a fictional character from the Australian soap opera Neighbours, played by Scott McGregor. He made his first appearance during the episode broadcast on 30 August 2010. McGregor initially had a four-week guest contract, but this was increased to six months. Shortly after, it was announced that McGregor's contract had been extended again to 12 months and that he would become a regular cast member. However, after his contract negotiations broke down McGregor was written out of the show, departing on 22 June 2011. He reprised his role for a brief return from 20 May 2013, before returning on 5 February 2014. McGregor departed Neighbours for a second time on 15 October 2019, but returned for a guest stint as part of the show's 35th anniversary celebrations on 17 February 2020.

Mark is introduced as the lead detective in the attempt on Paul Robinson's (Stefan Dennis) life. He receives conflicting information from the suspects he interviews, and struggles to identify the culprit. McGregor enjoyed being involved in the storyline, as he had never had that much responsibility before. To prepare for the role, McGregor researched his character's job. Mark is portrayed as a charming perfectionist. He is dedicated to his job in the police force and often puts his work ahead of everything else. As a consequence, he struggles to balance his work and personal lives. McGregor found that he shared some similarities with Mark and he enjoyed getting into character.

Producers soon established a relationship between Mark and Kate Ramsay (Ashleigh Brewer). The couple faced various obstacles, including Kate's jealous ex-boyfriend, an age gap, and Mark's focus on his work. Mark later has a one-night stand with Jade Mitchell (Gemma Pranita), and reports a fellow officer for corruption, which results in his life being threatened. The character left for witness protection during a special real-time episode. Following McGregor's decision to reprise the role, Mark's later storylines saw him reunite with Kate and deal with her death. Producers then paired him with Paige Smith (Olympia Valance) and his parents and siblings were later introduced. The character has been mostly well received by critics and viewers during his time on the show.

== Casting ==
On 16 June 2010, reporters from the Herald Sun confirmed that model and television presenter Scott McGregor had begun filming a guest appearance in the serial two days prior. It was later announced that McGregor would be playing Detective Mark Brennan. McGregor was originally given a four-week guest contract, but this was then increased to six months. McGregor said that Mark is his "first decent part" after appearing in bit roles in other Australian dramas, such as Underbelly. McGregor's contract was then increased again to 12 months when Mark proved popular with viewers. McGregor told a Herald Sun reporter that he was enjoying working on Neighbours, but he did not "realise how full-on it is."

== Development ==
=== Characterisation ===
"Detective Mark is a crime fighter, making Erinsborough a betterplace to live by taking down the bad guys without so much as breaking a sweat!"

— An Inside Soap writer on Mark (March 2011)

Shortly after he was cast, McGregor said that Mark was "a no-nonsense type. Work is his life, and when he's not at work, he's thinking about work". McGregor told the show's official website that he did some research on police officers to prepare for the role. The writers also went through their research with him. Jackie Brygel from TV Week described Mark as being "handsome" and a "charming investigator." Mark is a perfectionist, who puts his work ahead of everything else and he struggles to hold down a relationship because of it. His dedication to his job means that he does not have much time to socialise. When McGregor was asked if there were any similarities between him and Mark, he said that there was and that he liked getting into character.

Mark struggles with balancing his career and personal life and McGregor told Nate Micó from SX News that he would like to see Mark either grow in his job or get "tempted by the wrong side of the law" in the future. Mark manages to develop friendships with some of the other male characters, like Lucas Fitzgerald (Scott Major). Of this, McGregor said "Even though we're friends there are always references to me being a cop and they're always quite wary." When Mark becomes involved in an illegal street racing investigation, he expresses an interest in buying a motorbike. Inside Soap said they would like to see Mark on the road letting his "wild side" out. McGregor said he "loved" the storyline as he was given the chance to ride a motorbike.

=== Who Pushed P.R.? investigation ===
After Paul Robinson (Stefan Dennis) was pushed from the Lassiter's Hotel mezzanine, Mark was introduced as the lead detective on the case. Mark had his "work cut out for him" as he began questioning the suspects, as they each pointed the finger at someone else. He also received conflicting information as everyone had their own suspicions as to who committed the crime. McGregor revealed that Kate Ramsay (Ashleigh Brewer) had given Rebecca Robinson (Jane Hall) a false alibi, Lyn Scully (Janet Andrewartha) points out that Diana Marshall (Jane Badler) earring was found at the crime scene and Andrew Robinson (Jordan Smith) did not help himself with his attitude towards the investigation. Of the case, McGregor said "Brennan is in the thick of the investigation so it's pretty exciting, I've never had so much responsibility." McGregor later explained that it had been "great" to be involved in the storyline, even though he did not share many scenes with Dennis, as he was in a hospital bed. Rebecca was revealed to have been the one who pushed Paul and McGregor said that he knew early on in the storyline that she was the culprit. However, Mark did not know that Rebecca was responsible as he had been thrown by the false alibis. McGregor later said that his first week on Neighbours, filming the Who Pushed P.R? storyline, had stuck in his mind as there were many long interview scenes he had to get through.

=== Relationship with Kate Ramsay ===
In November 2010, it was announced that Mark would begin a relationship with Kate Ramsay (Ashleigh Brewer). Mark interviewed Kate while he was investigating who pushed Paul. Of their first meeting, McGregor commented "[He] thinks she's pretty cute but not a lot comes of it later, but there's a bit of a spark there." McGregor opined that Kate and Mark were a good match. Mark asked Kate to dinner, but she turned him down. She later changed her mind when he rescued her from lawyers, Toadfish Rebecchi (Ryan Moloney) and Samantha Fitzgerald (Simone Buchanan). Brewer welcomed the storyline, believing that her character was ready to move on from her previous relationship with Declan Napier (Erin Mullally). When Declan appeared during Kate and Mark's date, Kate was "furious" that he still had a hold on her life. Despite Kate telling Declan that she was over him, Declan saw Mark as a threat. McGregor commented that Mark put Declan's nose out of joint. Declan became a nuisance and tried to control Kate by telling her that Mark had threatened and attacked him. Kate initially believed Declan, but when she discovered the truth she had to work to get Mark back.

The incident helped push their romance into "top gear". Kate went to the police station to see Mark and they ended up kissing in front of his colleagues. McGregor called his first on-screen kiss with Brewer "awkward". Mark liked Kate as she was "a pretty easy-going girl who doesn't let too much get to her", but McGregor told TV Week that Mark was wary of starting a relationship with her because of Declan and his commitment to his work. He was also hesitant because of the age gap between them. McGregor told Holy Soap, "Kate's 19 and my character is about 25. It's funny because a few friends of mine have mentioned it, but I think it's because of what they do and where they are in life. At one point Kate's having driving lessons, and I'm working as a detective who's moved up through the ranks quickly, so we do seem quite different in age, but it's better left unsaid I think!" He added that Mark and Kate's relationship "may not be the easiest of rides."

Mark and Kate broke up after Kate confessed to lying in her police statement during Paul's investigation. McGregor told Inside Soap that Mark did not stop loving Kate and that since he had time to think about it, the issue was not as "black and white" as he first thought. Mark also noticed that Kyle Canning (Chris Milligan) had taken an interest in Kate and he did not like the idea of Kate moving on with Kyle. McGregor explained that Mark thought Kyle was an idiot and when he saw him with Kate, it forced Mark to come up with a plan to get closer to his ex-girlfriend. McGregor said, "He comes up with a reason to summon her to the station – which Kate sees right through!" Mark later asked Lucas for his advice, but Lucas was not much help. Both Kate and Mark wanted to get back together and Brewer said, "They both have a lot of history, such as the lie that Kate told to protect Rebecca and then Mark does something which really hurts Kate, and this prevents them from moving forward." The actress believed Mark was "the one" for Kate as they were both academic and focused.

=== One-night stand and police corruption ===
In April 2011, a TV Week columnist reported that Mark would have a one-night stand with Kate's best friend, Jade Mitchell (Gemma Pranita). At the same time, Mark also became involved in a police corruption storyline, after he reported Constable Wes Holland (Daniel Hamill), for taking bribes. McGregor told an Inside Soap writer, "Mark's life has been turned upside down since he blew the whistle on Constable Holland", adding that he was now being treated like he did the wrong thing. When Mark went to Charlie's to escape his troubles at the police station, he met up with Jade. They kissed as Jade became "the perfect distraction" for him. An Inside Soap reporter observed that of all the women Mark could have sought comfort in, Jade seemed the most unlikely as there was tension between them. Jade believed Mark had sided with Toadie against her sister and she told Kate not to give him a second chance.

After Jade challenged Mark to a game of pool, "sparks of a different kind" began to fly between them. McGregor explained the situation: "Mark has had a really bad day at work, so he's out for a fun night. To his surprise, he enjoys Jade's company. Lucas goes home early – and Mark and Jade end up sharing a kiss." The next morning it was made clear that Mark and Jade had spent the night together and Mark was full of regret. Mark was "terrified" that Kate would find out and even though Jade agreed to keep quiet, he does not feel any less guilty. Mark's problems at work continued and he became a victim of harassment when his car tyres were let down. Despite talking to his superior officer, nothing happens and Mark felt like he had no support from the people at his work place.

=== Departure (2011) ===
In December 2010, it was announced that Mark would be upgraded to a regular character. However, in February 2011, it was announced that McGregor was to leave Neighbours after contract negotiations led to his role being written out of the show. A reporter for the Herald Sun said McGregor's contract had not been renewed after it expired. The reporter also said the McGregor wanted to pursue other acting opportunities. McGregor also wanted to pursue modelling opportunities in Europe and he explained, "It's been tough [on Neighbours]. I didn't realise how many hours were involved, and I had to knock back so many modelling jobs." McGregor shot his final scenes in late April 2011. McGregor said Mark's exit storyline would see him forced out of Ramsay Street. He explained, "things get very difficult for Mark, and he's forced to make some tough decisions – both about his career and his feelings for Kate." Mark's departure unfolded during a real time episode, which was broadcast on 22 June 2011. Mark was forced to go into witness protection after he was stalked and threatened for exposing corruption within the police force. In a twist to the storyline, Mark was later said to have been killed. McGregor believed Mark could return in the future, saying "There have been plenty of other characters who've come back from the dead – but that's not to say I'd want to. But if Brennan ever does pop up again, I'd like to be asked first for the role."

=== Returns ===
On 4 November 2012, it was announced that McGregor would be returning to Neighbours for one month. TV Week's Erin Miller stated, "Fans of Scott's character, Detective Mark Brennan, will be overjoyed to discover he didn't die in witness protection as they'd been led to believe – and his return could potentially see him reunite with ex-girlfriend Kate". Brewer revealed that Mark's return scenes had to be filmed within a week because McGregor was only in Australia for a brief time. The actress explained that they had to film five weeks worth of episodes in one week, before McGregor flew back to Los Angeles. McGregor told a reporter for The Newcastle Herald that he had a feeling he was going to be asked back eventually, but it still came as a surprise to him. McGregor added that he could see himself staying for a longer time, but it would have to be right for himself and the show.

Mark returned during "Episode 6646", which focused on an eclipse. Kate was left questioning whether she had really seen him. Brewer said that her character would be torn when Mark returns, as she had moved on with Mason Turner (Taylor Glockner) and Mark's reappearance "just throws it all out of whack". When asked whether Kate and Mark's reunion would be bittersweet, McGregor explained "Brennan and Kate definitely have chemistry and their parting was not because they had fallen out of love. But things are different now and Kate has a new boyfriend. When Brennan tells her he still loves her it's hard because she thought he was dead and had let go of him."

On 28 October 2013, it was confirmed that McGregor had returned again and was filming at the show's studios and on location in Lysterfield. McGregor explained that he could not turn down the opportunity to come back to Neighbours, as he was building a house and had bills to pay. He was contracted until mid-July 2014. Mark returned on 5 February 2014. McGregor told Sarah Ellis from Inside Soap that he liked how Mark had become more laid back and was not so highly strung as before. He also said that Mark definitely wanted Kate back and added, "Brennan is honest that he's still in love with her – but she isn't going to make it easy for him!" McGregor extended his contract with Neighbours in May 2014, and Mark became a regular character.

=== Relationship with Paige Smith ===
In August 2014, it was confirmed that producers had planned a romance storyline for Mark and his housemate Paige Smith (Olympia Valance). After growing closer, they realised that they had a deeper connection than friendship. They later agreed to go out for dinner, but neither of them called it a date. Mark struggled with the idea of moving on from Kate, and even though he knew it was a date, he had not admitted it out loud. Mark ignored Paige afterwards, causing her to confront him as a storm hit Erinsborough. Brennan and Paige then consummated their relationship. Their first official date ended abruptly when Paige turned up wearing an old dress of Kate's she found in a charity shop. Brennan reacted angrily and shouted at Paige to leave the bar. He later realised that he had been too harsh, but just as he decided to give their relationship another go, he saw her kissing another man. McGregor commented "He thinks he's blown his chances with her – but he's also wondering if this is what he really wants."

McGregor was cautious about his character getting involved with Paige, believing they were "at different stages of their lives". McGregor also thought the age gap and difference in maturity would impact on their future. While Mark was undercover with the police, Paige witnessed a kiss between him and Dakota Davies (Sheree Murphy). After sitting down to discuss their relationship, Mark explained to Paige that he had been undercover and was investigating Dakota, who kissed him. Paige told Mark that he had not been treating her right and they decided to end their relationship. A few weeks later, Paige told Mark that she still loved him, but he did not feel the same way.

=== Departure (2019) ===
On 2 August 2019, Alice Coster of the Herald Sun reported that Mcgregor would be leaving Neighbours, following news that he and his wife were expecting their second child. Executive producer Jason Herbison said the character's exit storyline would allow for McGregor to make a return in the future if he chooses. Herbison stated, "Mark Brennan has been the anchor of so many pivotal stories on Neighbours over the years from Erinsborough's super cop to serial heartbroken romantic. We've thrown the drama handbook at the character and Scott has risen to the occasion every time, testament to his exceptional talent and versatility. We wish him all the best and as continually demonstrated with our storytelling, the door is never closed on Ramsay Street." Producers hoped McGregor would make an appearance for the serial's 35th anniversary celebrations in 2020 and were in discussions with his management. His return was confirmed on 24 November 2019.

The character's exit scenes aired on 15 October 2019. Mark decides to leave Erinsborough to help Tyler take care of their mother in Adelaide, after her Huntington's disease worsens. He plans a low-key exit and makes video messages for those who have meant something to him during his time on Ramsay Street. After his final scenes aired, McGregor admitted on social media that he was not a fan of his character's exit. The character returned on 17 February 2020, having been temporarily transferred back to Erinsborough to deal with a gun ring that Ned Willis (Ben Hall) has got caught up in. Mark is a detective once more, and he warns Yashvi Rebecchi (Olivia Junkeer) that dating Ned is not a good idea if she is serious about becoming a police officer. McGregor's final appearance aired on 20 April 2020.

== Storylines ==
After local businessman Paul Robinson is pushed from Lassiter's mezzanine, Mark is placed in charge of the investigation. He goes to the crime scene and then to the hospital to speak with Paul's wife, Rebecca. Mark learns Paul made several enemies before the attempt on his life and Diana Marshall becomes the prime suspect. Mark questions several Erinsborough residents, including Paul's son, Andrew, and Kate Ramsay, who gives Rebecca an alibi. When Andrew tries to help the investigation along, Mark warns him not to try and do his job for him. Paul wakes up from his coma and implies that Diana pushed him. She flees the country. Weeks later, Mark asks Kate out to dinner and after initially turning him down, she agrees. Their date is interrupted by Declan and Kate leaves. Declan and Mark later fight over Kate, but she is only interested in Mark. After Kate confronts Mark about making threats towards Declan, they break up. Kate learns Declan was lying and she apologises to Mark. She kisses him in front of his colleagues, making him realise that she is worth the risk. Mark tells Kate that he needs to solve Paul's case to prove himself to his superiors, but he decides that he does not want to sacrifice their relationship and he gives up the case.

Lucas Fitzgerald admits to Mark that he is involved in illegal races, and Mark goes undercover to catch the gang. Mark eventually catches the ringleader of the illegal races, Garland Cole (Jack Finsterer), after he asks Lucas to rebirth some cars for him. After Rebecca admits to pushing Paul, Kate confesses to giving her a false alibi. Mark breaks up with her, but he becomes jealous when it appears she is moving on with Kyle Canning. Mark briefly moves in with Toadfish Rebecchi, when his home has to be fumigated, and becomes a role model to his son, Callum (Morgan Baker). Kyle turns to Mark for help when he is blackmailed by corrupt policeman Wes Holland. Mark does not initially believe Kyle, but after seeing Holland taking a bribe, Mark arrests him. Some of Mark's colleagues turn against him. He has a one-night stand with Jade Mitchell and Kate struggles to forgive him. Mark is targeted with small acts of revenge for arresting Holland. Things escalate and Mark is asked to go into witness protection until the trial. Mark asks Kate to go with him and she agrees. However, she misses the deadline and Mark leaves without her. Shortly afterwards Toadie overhears a conversation at the police station and learns Mark has been killed. He is forbidden from telling anyone, but ultimately convinces the superintendent to tell Kate, who is heartbroken.

Two years later, Mark returns to Erinsborough. He tells Kate that Holland has died, so he was able to leave witness protection. Mark explains that his death had to be faked after Holland put out a hit on him. After learning that Kate had been asking about him, he believed that she wanted to see him again. Mark explains that he has been living in the Blue Mountains and working as an abseiling instructor. Mark and Kate spend time together, which makes her boyfriend, Mason, jealous. Mark also catches up with Lucas and Kyle. He tries to persuade Kate that her future is with him and they kiss. But when Mason learns Mark has a girlfriend in Sydney, he tells Kate, resulting in a fight between himself and Mark. Mark tells Kate that he was going to propose to his girlfriend, but wanted to see where things stood between them first. Kate chooses Mason and Mark leaves. Months later, Mason runs into Mark in Lysterfield, where he asks for his help as Josh Willis (Harley Bonner) has been injured abseiling. Mark accompanies the group to the hospital, where he runs into Kate. Mark decides to stay in Erinsborough and is offered a job at Fitzgerald Motors by Danni Ferguson (Laura McIntosh). He also moves into Number 24.

Danni confides in Mark that is struggling to move on from her abusive ex-partner, Stephen Montague (Damian Hill), and Mark invites Danni to move in with him. He later saves her from being kidnapped by Stephen. Mark asks Kate for another chance, but she turns him down and Paul warns him to stay away from her. Mark's ex-girlfriend Sienna Matthews (Sarah Roberts) tries to win him back, but Mark reunites with Kate. Paul disapproves of the relationship, so Kate moves in with Mark. Sienna returns once again to try and win Mark back, but he rejects her. Mark proposes to Kate on her birthday and she accepts, but shortly after, she is shot and dies. Paul blames Mark for Kate's death. Believing Montague is responsible, Mark lures him out of hiding by using Danni as bait. Montague breaks into Mark's house and holds him and Imogen Willis (Ariel Kaplan) hostage. After Mark tackles him, Montague escapes and is caught by the police. Mark then learns that Montague had an alibi for the time of the shooting. Sienna is also questioned as she gave a false alibi. Mark lets her stay with him. Sienna kisses him, but soon apologises. Mark discovers a threatening note from Sienna to Kate and she is questioned by the police again. A taxi driver backs up Sienna's alibi and she leaves.

Paul asks Mark to steal some police files, hoping to find a lead in Kate's case, but Mark decides against it. Mark witnesses Paul buying a gun and he and Matt Turner (Josef Brown) stop Paul from shooting Victor Cleary (Richard Sutherland), who confesses to shooting Kate in revenge for Paul killing his brother Gus (Ben Barrack). Paul gives Mark a written confession saying he killed Gus, but Mark does not hand it to the police. Paige Smith moves in with Mark, and he helps her when she is revealed to be the secret daughter of Lauren Turner (Kate Kendall) and Brad Willis (Kip Gamblin). Mark and Paige begin a relationship, and Paul accuses Mark of moving on from Kate too quickly. Mark is asked to get closer to Dakota Davies (Sheree Murphy) and use her interest in him to investigate her. Mark and Matt lead a police raid on Dakota's business and find she is smuggling diamonds, however Dakota gets away. Mark and Paige realise that he is not as committed to the relationship as she is and they break up. Mark supports Sonya (Eve Morey) when she becomes the victim of a poison pen letter campaign. Sonya's stalker, Erin (Adrienne Pickering), breaks into Sonya's house and knocks Mark unconscious. Both Mark and Sonya try to help Erin. Mark convinces her to go to the hospital after she falls ill and invites her to stay with him temporarily.

Mark grows closer to Naomi Canning (Morgana O'Reilly) and helps her out when she is threatened by Dennis Dimato (David Serafin). Mark's younger brother, Tyler (Travis Burns), gets a job at the garage and he moves in with Mark. In an effort to bring down Dimato, Mark rejoins the police force, but has to start back as a constable. After assuring Naomi that he does not have feelings for Paige, they declare themselves an official couple. Mark learns Matt has been accepting bribes from Dimato and Brennan agrees not to tell anyone if Matt takes long-service leave and gives him a statement about Dimato's operations. Matt dies after being involved in a hit-and-run and Brennan attacks Dimato when he turns up to Matt's wake. He uses Matt's information to set up a police sting to catch the thief stealing cars for Dimato. The police follow a stolen car back to Dimato and Brennan arrests him. Brennan and Naomi's relationship suffers when she becomes Paul's executive assistant. Brennan asks Lauren if he can expose Matt's corruption to put Dimato in prison, which causes her son, Bailey (Calen Mackenzie), to lash out at him. Naomi breaks up with Mark and he learns that she has feelings for Paul. Her mother Sheila Canning (Colette Mann) tries to reunite them as she disapproves of Paul, while Paul decides to help Mark win Naomi back. He succeeds, but she discovers that Paul has been helping Mark out with their dates and ends their relationship.

Mark shows an interest in Paige, but discovers she is dating Tyler. He later learns that this is a ruse to cover up their involvement with Dimato, who has bought the garage. They eventually regain Mark's trust after helping to bring Dimato to justice, and Mark and Paige reunite. Mark and Tyler's brother Aaron (Matt Wilson) comes to stay with them, and they are later joined by their father Russell (Russell Kiefel), who has a strained relationship with his sons. The Brennans consider buying the garage together, but Tyler later reveals that Russell abused him when he was younger. Mark and Aaron support Tyler and force Russell to leave. Mark and Paige discuss their future together when he admits that he is ready to have children, while she is not. Mark asks Tyler to buy Number 24 with him. They brothers fall out when Tyler learns that Mark tried to protect Aaron from arrest during his investigation into the Erinsborough High fire. While discussing their future, Mark and Paige get engaged. Mark is deeply critical of Paige when she befriends Dimato's lover Michelle Kim (Ra Chapman), who claims to be on the run from Dimato. The issue divides Mark, who does not trust Michelle, and Paige, who believes Mark thinks she is naïve. On their wedding day the police find stolen items with Paige's fingerprints on them, and Mark arrests her. She explains that Dimato and Michelle were trying to set her up and that Paul helped her deal with the situation, and that she did not tell Mark to protect him. Furious at Paige for further lies after promising there would be no secrets between them, Mark calls off the wedding. He later apologises and tries to convince Paige to take him back, but she refuses, wanting to find direction in her life and believing they are too different.

Mark befriends Stephanie Scully (Carla Bonner); they share a kiss, before deciding to remain friends. After a jealous Paige fights with Steph, Mark and Steph have sex and begin a relationship. Following an explosion at Lassiter's Hotel, Mark finds evidence Paul was responsible and arrests him. Released on bail, Paul convinces Steph of his innocence, causing trouble in her and Mark's relationship. Tyler is later questioned and Mark is removed from the case. Mark raises the subject of having children with Steph and she tells him she is open to the idea of having a child with him in the future. Mark starts to think Paul could be innocent, but is threatened with dismissal if he continues to investigate. He later discovers that Jacka Hills (Brad McMurray) caused the explosion on Julie Quill's (Gail Easdale) orders. Mark investigates the release of snakes in Ramsay Street and soon realises that Steph is being stalked. Hearing that someone has made a confession to Father Jack Callahan (Andrew Morley), Mark bugs the confessional, despite being ordered not to. Mark learns from Steph's former girlfriend Belinda Bell (Nikki Shiels) that one of her patients Ari Philcox (Dylan Watson) is behind the release of the snakes. Mark is suspended when the bug is discovered. Despite this, Mark goes after Ari when he threatens Belinda and Steph's son Charlie Hoyland (Alexander McGuire), but he is stabbed in the process. His injuries are not life-threatening.

Steph and Mark are saddened when Charlie has to return home, and decide to have a child together. However, Steph fears that her mental health problems will return and Sonya offers to be their surrogate. When they learn that Steph has a low ovarian count, Steph ends the relationship, until Mark convinces her to try the IVF procedure once. Victoria Lamb (Claudia Greenstone) then informs them that are not able to collect any viable eggs, so Sonya also offers to be an egg donor. The fertilisation goes ahead, but Steph has second thought and asks Mark and Sonya to end the process. Mark proposes to Steph and she accepts. Shortly after, Sonya announces she is pregnant. Mark begins spending more time with Sonya, making Steph feel left out. Steph ends her relationship with Mark after she develops feelings for Victoria. Mark and Sonya learn they are having a girl, but Sonya later suffers a miscarriage. While they are grieving together, Mark develops feelings for Sonya and they kiss, but Sonya tells him she wants to remain friends. Mark tampers with evidence when it becomes clear Sonya caused is responsible for a car accident at the Erinsborough Backpackers'. Mark visits Paige in Queensland and they kiss, but Paige rejects him when he declares his feelings for her.

Mark begins spending time with Elly Conway (Jodi Anasta) and they develop a relationship. Mark, Aaron and Tyler's mother Fay Brennan (Zoe Bertram) comes to visit. She tells them that their father has been in contact and Aaron encourages her to see him. A couple of weeks later, Fay tells her sons that Russell has suffered a heart attack and wants to see them. But shortly before they are due to depart, Russell dies. He leaves Mark his fishing rods in his will, but leaves Aaron and Tyler his boat. Sheila then tells Mark, Aaron and Tyler that Fay had an affair and one of them is not Russell's son. Fay returns and tells Tyler his father is actually Hamish Roche (Sean Taylor), who arrives in town shortly after. Mark encourages Tyler to bond with Hamish. Elly breaks up with Mark upon learning Paige has feelings for him. Hamish goads Mark into losing his temper in front of Tyler, and Mark suspects that Hamish is trying to turn Tyler against him. Hamish and Mark get into a scuffle on the boat, and Hamish falls and hits his head on the deck. Tyler tells his brother to get his anger issues under control. Mark and Paige get back together. Mark is called to the hospital to find a contact for nurse Louise McLeod (Maria Theodorakis), who is in a coma. He begins to suspect that there is a link between her and Hamish. Hamish makes a complaint to Mark's superior that he is harassing him, and Mark is taken off the case.

Mark asks Fay to return to Erinsborough and she reveals that Louise was Russell's nurse and is suspected of causing his death. Hamish's body is found floating in the spa at Number 26 and Tyler admits that he hit his father with a garden gnome, but Hamish was still alive when he left. Mark goes to the evidence locker and wipes Tyler's fingerprints off the gnome. After admitting to tampering with evidence in Sonya's investigation and Hamish's murder, Mark is suspended from the police force. Paige's son Gabriel Smith (Kian Bafekrpour) is kidnapped by Louise and she tells Mark to bring her money and a passport for his safe return. Gabe's father, Jack, calls the police and Louise is arrested. Gabe is later returned to Number 24 anonymously. Jack punches Mark during an argument about Gabe. Tyler is sentenced to 20 years in prison for Hamish's murder. Mark accepts a job at the garage. Paige wins a glamping in a raffle and she and Mark arrive at the camp to find Jack and Steph there. Mark plans to propose to Paige, but she admits that she had sex with Jack. Mark later ends their relationship, and he struggles to be around Paige and Jack. Both Mark and Jack agree to help Yashvi Rebecchi (Olivia Junkeer) with her football training, but when Mark kicks a football towards an inattentive Jack, it hits Gabe's pram, which falls into the lake. Gabe is fine and Mark apologises. Mark almost has sex with Izzy Hoyland (Natalie Bassingthwaighte), but they are interrupted and he leaves. He later kisses Elly, but she knows that he is not over Paige and he apologises. Mark and Aaron's sister Chloe Brennan (April Rose Pengilly) arrives for an extended visit and hopes to reconnect with her brothers. Mark makes his peace with Paige, before she and Jack leave Erinsborough. Mark and Elly resume dating, and their relationship slowly becomes more serious. When Chloe reveals that she has Huntington's disease, an incurable hereditary disease, Mark is tested but learns he does not have the condition. Elly proposes to Mark, who accepts, and they begin planning their wedding.

With Elly's support, Mark contests his suspension from the police force, using his grief at Caitlin's death to explain his past misconduct. Weeks before his wedding, Mark learns Sonya has been diagnosed with stage four ovarian cancer. Broken by the thought of losing someone else, Mark pushes Elly away, considers calling off the wedding and begins visiting Kate's grave. The news of Sonya's sudden death causes Mark to have a panic attack. He decides to leave town for a few days, but later sends Elly a text calling off the wedding. Aaron finds Mark in the outback and persuades him to return. Mark tells Elly he loves her and they marry. However, during the reception, Mark finds Elly crying outside and she admits that she cheated on him with Chloe. Mark's relationships with Chloe and Aaron, who knew about the affair, are strained. He gives Elly his wedding ring back. When Elly tells Mark that she is pregnant, he allows her to move back in, but struggles to be intimate with her. Mark misses Elly's ultrasound appointment, but later sees her holding a picture of a baby and assumes that it is theirs. Elly later tells Mark that he is not the father of her baby, and the ultrasound image belongs to Caitlin. Mark ends their marriage and files for an annulment, which Elly does not contest.

Mark and Chloe eventually reconcile when she turns to him for advice about Pierce Greyson (Tim Robards). He struggles when she and Elly later go on a date and admits to feeling replaced when Chloe accompanies Elly to an ultrasound appointment. Mark investigates the theft of money from Leo Tanaka's (Tim Kano) Back Lane Bar bank account, but doubts the money will be recovered. Leo's business partner Roxy Willis (Zima Anderson) is frustrated by lack of progress in investigation and berates Mark when he comes to the bar to celebrate his birthday. Later that night, Roxy comes to apologise to Mark and they have sex. They continue a casual relationship in secret. Mark learns Pierce has children and urges him to tell Chloe, who has reunited with him. Mark and Roxy's relationship is exposed when she drunkly kisses him during a party for Sheila. Mark breaks up with Roxy, but later gets drunk and apologises for letting the opinions of others affect him. He also rejects Chloe and Aaron's attempts at an intervention.

Mark is uncomfortable with Roxy's behaviour during a date and admits he is used to more conservative dates. Roxy tries changing her image for their next date, but Mark insults her and says that he could never be in a relationship with her. Chloe tells him off for hurting Roxy, so he takes her flowers and apologises, but Roxy ends things between them for good. Mark later tells Chloe that he feels lost. The Brennans learn that Fay has gone missing, but she soon turns up at Mark's door, where they learn that her Huntingtons has progressed and she needs 24-hour supervision. Chloe considers moving to Adelaide, but Pierce tells Mark that seeing Fay deteriorate will be a preview of Chloe's future. The family go to Adelaide and on their return, Mark decides to move there to help Tyler take care of Fay. Not wanting to make face to face goodbyes, Mark records several video messages for his friends and family. He later visits Sonya's memorial bush at Lassiters, where he shares a goodbye with Elly.

Six months later, Mark is temporarily seconded back to Erinsborough. While he is in town, he is reunited with Paige, who has returned amidst relationship problems with Jack. When they break up, Mark admits to Aaron that he still has feelings for Paige. The former couple continue to reconnect, but Mark is abruptly called back to Adelaide. However, Paige declares her feelings for him and he decides to stay so they can begin dating again. Despite their concerns about living in different states, their romance progresses fast and Paige proposes to Mark so they can get married as part of the Lassiter's wedding expo. After they marry, Jack tells Mark and Paige that he has accepted a priesthood in Adelaide, meaning Paige and Gabe can move to be with Mark and his family. Mark investigates Finn Kelly's (Rob Mills) death and is concerned when Elly comes under suspicion. Aware that the case is stacked against his ex-wife, Mark decides to stay on longer in Erinsborough to help Senior Detective Sky Mangel (Stephanie McIntosh) with the case. After noticing that his brother-in-law, David Tanaka (Takaya Honda), is struggling to deal with Finn's crimes, Mark gives him access to transcripts of Finn's video diaries, in which he talks about his returning memories and feelings. Sky finds out and reprimands Mark. He later discovers that Chloe has copied the videos onto a USB stick and given it to Elly behind his back. Paige contacts Mark to tell him that she is pregnant and he is delighted that he is finally going to be a father. He and Paige later hold an official wedding in Adelaide, which is attended by his family. At the end of the year, David and Aaron receive news that Paige has given birth to a son, whom she and Mark have named Freddie.

== Other appearances ==
To coincide with the character's return in February 2014, the serial released a series of webisodes called Brennan on the Run that focus on Mark's time in witness protection. A trailer for the spin-off was released the day before Mark's return to Neighbours. Producers announced that viewers would be able to choose the outcome of the story and take control of Mark "as he faces challenges, dodges danger and encounters a little bit of romance". Each webisode ended with a "yes" or "no" answer, which then took viewers to a different video. The series featured the character Sienna Matthews (Sarah Roberts), who was Mark's girlfriend during his first return stint, although she remained off-screen. The webisodes were shot using a Red Scarlet camera by digital producer Ric Forster, which gave them "a different, edgier look and feel" compared to the show's usual episodes.

== Reception ==
The character has proven popular with viewers and critics due to his aesthetically pleasing looks. A Daily Star reporter said McGregor's contract was extended because female viewers "went mad for him." Nate Micó of SX News praised the casting of McGregor, saying "As the brooding Detective Mark Brennan, handsome actor Scott McGregor has bought a welcome dose of eye candy to Ramsay Street." Television critic Andrew Mercado called Mark a "hunky new investigative cop." Alan Fletcher (who plays Karl Kennedy) said that McGregor is "fantastic" as Mark and he added "He's not only spectacularly handsome, he's also a very fine actor." Holy Soap said Mark's most memorable moment was "His first kiss with Kate – at the police station in front of all his colleagues!" In March 2011, Mark came second in a poll run by Inside Soap magazine to find reader's favourite "hunky" soap detective. He received 31% of the vote. In April, the magazine's letters editor, Sarah Ellis, said she would like to buy a calendar featuring Mark, as she would love to have the "hunky policeman [...] adorning the walls of Inside Soap towers."

A writer for Buzz magazine became bored of the repetitive nature of the storyline surrounding Mark trying to ask Kate out again. They said "honestly, how many times have we been through this with these two?" They later branded him "one angry man" during the police corruption storyline. They said he had sex with Jade because "too much stewing over work and not enough play makes Brennan a dull boy". TV Week described Mark's departure episode as "edge-of-your-seat." Of his departure, a reporter for the Daily Record said "Goodbye Brennan – we enjoyed having you and your hunky good looks around, but all good things must come to an end." While Cameron Adams of the Herald Sun commented "Busy week on Ramsay St, what with cop Mark racking off. And just as he was starting to get less wooden."

Nicky Branagh from Studentbeans.com included Mark in her list of the "Top ten hottest Aussie soap guys" and she stated "As Ramsay Street's resident hottie back in 2010, Scott McGregor graced Neighbours as the coolest kind of police investigator (he rode a motorbike). Unfortunately for us, Scott fled his neighbourly friends to flaunt his devilishly handsome face to the world as a model." Following the character's return, Claire Crick from All About Soap commented "Yay! We've been waiting for weeks and finally hunky Brennan's back on the street. All we need now is for Kate to fall into his arms and for them to be back together forever... Oh, hang on a minute. That's definitely not going to happen!" Crick went on to say that Kate was more suited to Mark than Mason and that picking between the two should be a no-brainer. Anthony D. Langford from TheBacklot.com quipped "Oh and he's kind of a goof, but Brennan is really hot." Cameron Adams (Herald Sun) later praised McGregor, saying "Credit where it's due, model Scott McGregor was hired by Neighbours a few years ago for his looks (let's be honest) but his acting chops have really kicked on and he has been getting meatier storylines."

In 2016, Crick (All About Soap) criticised the character for arresting his fiancée on their wedding day, saying "We all know Mark Brennan can be a bit strait-laced when it comes to being a copper (has there ever been a man in Ramsay Street who takes the law so seriously?), but apprehending your own bride while she's practically waiting at the altar for you... Really, mate?!" Melinda Houston of The Sydney Morning Herald was also critical of the character, branding him "the most ineffectual cop in Australia". She continued, "Constable Mark Brennan has a great line in frowning, but his interview skills leave something to be desired, as do his powers as an investigator." In 2019, Digital Spy's Conor McMullan included Mark's misery in a feature about the storylines Neighbours keep repeating. He wrote, "Not since Harold Bishop has one man endured so much tragedy as Mark Brennan. In a genre full of tragic heroines, he's Neighbours' tragic hero. His beloved fiancée Kate was shot dead (or was she?), he arrested Paige on their wedding day, baby Caitlin died, his best friend died, and his sister slept with Elly days before their wedding. But hey, at least they made it up the aisle. That's progress." McMullan praised McGregor's acting performances during the darker stories and hoped the writers would let Mark be happy in the future by giving him a child.
