= Jade Mitchell (Neighbours) =

Fictional character from the Australian soap opera Neighbours

- Neighbours character
- Portrayed by: Gemma Pranita
- Duration: 2010–2012, 2019
- First appearance: 10 December 2010
- Last appearance: 11 March 2019
- Introduced by: Susan Bower (2010); Jason Herbison (2019)
In-universe information
- Occupation: Personal trainer
- Father: John Mitchell
- Mother: Fiona Mitchell
- Half-sisters: Sonya Rebecchi
- Nephews: Callum Rebecchi; Hugo Somers (adoptive)
- Nieces: Nell Rebecchi

Jade Mitchell is a fictional character from the Australian soap opera Neighbours, played by Gemma Pranita. Pranita's casting was announced on 7 September 2010 and she began filming her first scenes the day before. The actress was in Russia when she received a call from her agent about the audition for Neighbours. She returned to Australia and her agent managed to get her in on the last day. Pranita won the part of Jade and she was given a twelve-month contract with the show. She relocated to Melbourne for filming and she made her first screen appearance as Jade during the episode broadcast on 10 December 2010. In June 2012, Pranita announced her departure from Neighbours. She filmed her final scenes in August and departed on 29 October 2012.

Jade is the younger sister of Sonya Mitchell (Eve Morey). Prior to her arrival in Erinsborough, the sisters had been estranged for seven years. Pranita revealed that Jade was holding onto one of Sonya's darkest secrets and that she would have the potential to cause trouble for her. Jade was portrayed as "vivacious, confident" and "very opinionated". She is a feminist, with a fighting spirit. While Jade is flirtatious and a bit of a maneater, Pranita said she is "anti-relationships" and more interested in finding fun. Jade is a personal trainer and Pranita chose to take up an exercise routine for the role. Jade's early storylines focused on her attempts to mend her relationship with Sonya and bond with her nephew, Callum Jones (Morgan Baker), and Sonya's partner Toadfish Rebecchi (Ryan Moloney).

Later storylines revolved around Jade's romantic relationships; she kissed Lucas Fitzgerald (Scott Major) shortly after her arrival, she had a one-night stand with Mark Brennan (Scott McGregor), and she later had an affair with Malcolm Kennedy (Benjamin McNair). Producers established a long-term relationship between Jade and her housemate Kyle Canning (Chris Milligan), which initially began as a friends with benefits arrangement. Further exploration of the character's background began when it emerged that Jade had been in an abusive relationship with Sonya's former boyfriend, Troy Miller (Dieter Brummer). The character departed for the United States to launch her business. Jade returned on 1 March 2019, after Pranita reprised the role for Sonya's exit storyline.

== Casting ==
On 7 September 2010, a reporter for the Herald Sun announced Pranita had joined the cast of Neighbours as Jade Mitchell. They said Pranita's character would arrive on Ramsay Street to expose a secret held by her sister, Sonya (Eve Morey). Pranita was in Russia researching Anton Chekhov when her agent called her about an audition for Neighbours. She told a writer for Channel 5 "They were holding auditions and I happened to be in Russia doing a Chekhov pilgrimage because I'd received a grant. I just thought, oh well, it's not to be but then I came back and my agent called and said I can squeeze you in on the last day. So within a week I was moving cities." Pranita was initially given a twelve-month contract and she began filming her first scenes on 6 September. She made her first on screen appearance as Jade in December 2010. During an interview published the Neighbours official website, Pranita revealed that she had found the filming schedule was "quite full-on" and that she was still getting used to the early starts.

== Development ==
=== Characterisation ===
Jade has been described as being "vivacious, confident and beautiful" by a writer for the official Neighbours website. She has a flirtatious side and a "fighting spirit", which means nothing will stand in her way. Jackie Brygel, writing for TV Week, said Jade "clearly isn't backward in coming forward when it comes to getting what she wants in life." Pranita told Brygel that Jade is a feminist and a bit of a man eater. The actress believed that she was not that similar to her character, saying "She is very opinionated which I can be, but I don't think I'm brash with my ideas or assert my ideas on to people which she does." Pranita also said Jade is "anti-relationships" and more interested in having fun, whereas she has been in a relationship for five years. However, when she was asked about what she would like to see in Jade's future, Pranita said she wanted her to meet a love interest who "really challenges her and breaks her down a bit, because she's a little bit of a martyr."

Jade is a personal trainer and a "fitness freak". Pranita took up exercise during her research for the role, something she had not done before, and commented that she had enjoyed it. In May 2011, Pranita confessed that she had not been able to maintain Jade's fitness routine and that, while she was still into it, her filming schedule had increased. The actress also revealed that she had found that she now shared some similar personality traits with her character. Pranita admitted that she and Jade hide their vulnerability and they do not like putting their "issues onto other people". In July 2011, executive producer, Susan Bower revealed Jade would continue to be a "naughty girl" and that she was hiding a dark secret. Pranita teased the storyline further saying Jade was too proud to share her secret with anyone and initially only the audience would know what the secret was. Viewers would also see Jade go on a "self-destructive path and becomes involved with an older man."

During an August 2011 interview with Digital Spy's Daniel Kilkelly, Pranita said she was pleased with how the audience had responded to her character considering she was a "big personality". Pranita quipped that viewers had forgiven her "brash approach" and said they liked having a strong female character around. Asked if she had managed to put her own stamp on the character, Pranita revealed "I think there has been a marriage between the work I've done and what the writers have created, so we have inspired each other. Jade has developed into exactly what I would like her to be." Pranita said she was pleased that Jade was getting her own storylines away from her sister, as it gives her the opportunity to discover new things about her character. She added that Jade was starting to become tri-dimensional and the audience were learning that she is quite complex. Pranita later called her character "beautifully flawed".

=== Family ===
"I don’t have a sister which I think is why I've had this tornado love affair with Eve. She is like the sister I've never had."

— Pranita on having an on-screen sister

Before her arrival in Erinsborough, Jade had been estranged from her sister for seven years. Jade calls Sonya out of the blue and Pranita explained "Sonya's response is 'Why are you calling me? Why now? Don't come anywhere near me!' But Jade keeps ringing and harassing Sonya and then rocks up on her doorstep." Jade's appearance on her doorstep sends Sonya into a panic. Pranita told TV Week's Jackie Brygel that the history between Jade and Sonya is bad and that Jade is "holding one of Sonya's darkest secrets". Pranita believed that Jade had the potential to cause a lot of trouble for Sonya and expose her for lying to the people around her. She added that Jade would "completely rock the boat." Morey revealed that the last time Sonya saw her younger sister was when she left her son, Callum (Morgan Baker) with their grandmother, Hilda (Maureen Edwards). Sonya believes that Jade has come to Erinsborough to get "some revenge." When Jade learns that Sonya has been living with Callum and that he is unaware of who she really is, she urges her sister to tell him the truth. However, after seeing how happy the family is, Jade changes her mind.

Pranita stated that Jade and Sonya's relationship was initially very "rocky", but after Jade sees how happy her sister is, she becomes "fiercely supportive" of her. Pranita said "It's almost the Mitchell sisters against Ramsay Street." Of her role in the Sonya/Callum storyline, Pranita told a writer for the show's official website "I was overwhelmed and completely intimidated, especially since Jade is such a confident character. I was so nervous and terrified but I had to exude confidence which was really hard. But at the same time it was thrilling. I was definitely thrown in the deep end with a bang." Susan Bower said Jade "loves and adores" her sister and nephew and she quipped that the audience could tell Jade is "not a cold fish." Jade does not initially get on well with Sonya's partner, Toadfish Rebecchi (Ryan Moloney). Pranita said both characters struggle with each other. She told a reporter for Channel 5 "It's a very push-pull relationship and they can both be quite fiery so they really lay into each other." Jade and Toadie eventually learn they both have a secret passion for board games and they begin to bond with one another. When Sonya suffers a pregnancy scare she immediately confides in Jade, who is "level-headed" about the situation. She encourages her sister to take a second pregnancy test just to be sure. Pranita later stated that Jade and Sonya would continue to support each other as sisters.

=== Relationship with Kyle Canning ===
When Pranita was asked which character she would like Jade to start a relationship with, she chose Kyle Canning (Chris Milligan). She thought Jade and Kyle's contrasting personalities would work together, saying "They're opposites and personally, I really enjoy working with Chris. I think the characters can learn a lot from each other. Jade is very worldly and smart and Kyle has a more simple and uncomplicated nature." Jade eventually develops feelings for Kyle and Pranita believed her character's feelings were for real and said it had taken her by surprise. Jade and Kyle share a house together and on the night of their housewarming party they kiss, making Jade fall for Kyle even more. However, she is frustrated when Kyle reveals that he still sees her as a friend. Pranita told a Channel 5 reporter that Jade is trying to fight her feelings for Kyle because she is terrified of relationships, however she does want him. Jade decides to "let go of her reservations" and gets dressed up to make a move on Kyle. They have sex and Kyle suggests they engage in a friends with benefits arrangement to which Jade agrees. Pranita told an Inside Soap journalist that Jade agrees to the arrangement as it is her way of working Kyle out of her system, but the opposite happens and she falls in love with him. Kyle is unaware of Jade's feelings for him and he flirts with local nurse, Danielle Paquette (Georgia Bolton), in front of her. Jade becomes jealous and Pranita said she has never been affected like that before and is unsure how to handle it.

"I would like to see her settle down, although I don't think she would actually settle. But it would be a really interesting chapter in her life to be in a solid relationship for the first time."

— Pranita on seeing her character settle down

Jade's situation gets worse as her new housemate, Rhys (Ben Barber), notices how uncomfortable she is around Kyle and Danielle. Rhys confronts Jade and she denies her interest in Kyle because she is scared Rhys will tell him. Of this, Pranita said "Deep down, she's afraid that if Kyle ever finds out the truth about her feelings, he'll simply reject her..." Pranita quipped that Jade is too proud to admit she has fallen for someone, but Rhys becomes determined to make Jade face up to reality. Pranita explained "It's really challenging having that dynamic in the house, with another person knowing her secret. She knows he'll use it to blackmail her eventually." Kyle leaves Erinsborough for a few weeks to care for his sick mother. He returns in time for Christmas, where he gives Jade a handmade photo frame at a housemates lunch. Pranita told Lucy Walker of TV Week that Jade is touched by the gift as Kyle used his money to make her "something meaningful." She is also surprised that he went to that much effort for her and the gesture makes Jade fall for Kyle even more. The couple share a passionate kiss under some mistletoe and Jade takes the opportunity to open up to Kyle about her commitment issues. She reveals that she was physically abused by her ex-boyfriend. Pranita explained "She's never told anyone, not even her sister, Sonya. But Jade's a vault like that and, as hard as it is for her to talk about it, deep down there's an element of relief to share a part of her life with him. It is so difficult for her to talk about her personal life to anyone. So that's a really big deal."

The moment between Jade and Kyle is ruined when Kyle learns of her relationship with Malcolm Kennedy (Benjamin McNair). Jade tells Kyle that she only went with Malcolm to get over him, but it was unsuccessful. Jade then declares her love for Kyle, but he turns his back on her and Jade decides to leave Erinsborough and go to Sydney. However, she changes her mind at the last minute and decides not to get on the coach because she cannot leave Kyle. Jade then finds Kyle has come to stop her and they kiss. The conclusion to Jade and Kyle's "will they, won't they?" storyline aired during Neighbours' 2011 season finale week. When asked about Jade and Kyle finally becoming a couple, Pranita told Inside Soap's Jason Herbison "Kyle is definitely thinking, 'Thank God she's finally come round!'. But I'm sure he's walking on eggshells because Jade is still so guarded." Pranita explained that Jade has a lot of rules when it comes to relationships and she is on a huge emotional journey. The actress said that Jade wants to enjoy it, but cannot help worrying about when it will all stop.

Jade's relationship with Kyle ends in July 2012, after Kate confesses that they kissed. Kate is feeling guilty about her kiss with Kyle and she tells Jade in the middle of the street. Jade then makes it clear that she want nothing more to do with Kate. Pranita told TV Week's Jackie Brygel and Erin Miller that the news comes a complete shock to Jade and she is not sure how to process it in the moment. Pranita revealed "She had no clue, not a hint, that something was happening between them. Jade allowed herself to fall completely for Kyle. She felt as though she was in this amazing place and now Kate bursts that bubble in the most shocking of ways." The actress explained that Jade feels it is the worst sort of betrayal and after she confronts Kyle, she "goes into self-defence protection mode" and decides to eliminate him from her life. Pranita stated that she understands her character's reaction as she needs time to process and reflect. However, it is hard for her to punish Kyle as she really loved him.

=== Other relationships ===
==== Lucas Fitzgerald ====
Shortly after her arrival, Jade sets her sights on Lucas Fitzgerald (Scott Major). After spending the evening flirting with him, she kisses him. Pranita said Jade thinks Lucas is cute and there is an attraction between them. Of the kiss, Pranita said "Jade and Lucas have only just met, but Jade is very free-spirited and does things on impulse." Lucas pulls away from the kiss as he has feelings for someone else, but Sonya witnesses it and is angry with her sister. Pranita admitted that she was nervous about filming the scene as it was her first screen kiss and it occurred during her first week on the show. When asked if the kiss is the start of a romance for Jade and Lucas, Pranita said that Jade is caught up with a lot of family issues for the moment, but anything could happen in the future. In February 2011, Pranita commented on Jade and Lucas, saying they are both strong characters, who are quite similar as they are "loners who dance to their own beat." Major also said that he would like his character to have a romance with Jade. Lucas and Jade become friends after the kiss and they often argue, which led to Major calling their relationship a "love/hate stand-off." Major revealed that he had asked the writers to put Lucas and Jade together, but they did not seem keen.

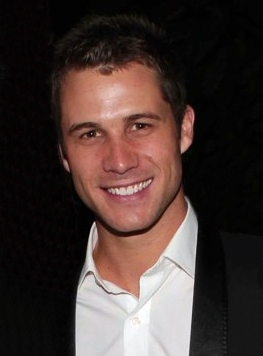
Jade had a one-night stand with Mark Brennan, played by Scott McGregor (pictured).

==== Mark Brennan ====
In April 2011, a reporter for TV Week stated that Jade would have a one-night stand with Mark Brennan (Scott McGregor). Jade and Mark grow closer after he goes for a drink at Charlie's, they play pool together and then "find themselves kissing." Pranita told the reporter that Jade is "risking the wrath" of her close friend Kate Ramsay (Ashleigh Brewer), who recently broke up with Mark. She said "Jade doesn't consider Kate in that moment, as she knows she's broken up with Brennan and doesn't appreciate that it's just not cool to hook up with other people's exes. But I think Kate will be horrified and shocked and angry." McGregor told Digital Spy's Daniel Kilkelly that he did not think Jade and Mark would have made a good match, and that it was a one off thing. He added that in some ways they regret it, but in others they do not. Pranita later revealed that what Jade had learnt from the one-night stand with Mark was not to risk a friendship for a man again.

==== Malcolm Kennedy ====
Jade befriends Malcolm Kennedy in October 2011, and they begin flirting with each other. Susan Hill from the Daily Star said Jade uses Malcolm to distract her from her feelings for Kyle. The fact Malcolm is married appeals to her because she knows there is no chance of a relationship there. Jade tells her sister that she is no longer thinking about Kyle and a concerned Sonya tries to warn her off Malcolm. However, Jade decides she needs some fun and reckons he is the person to help her. Jade and Malcolm's innocent flirting turns into something more serious when they arrange a "late-night rendezvous." Malcolm reminds Jade he is married, but that does not stop them from kissing. Pranita said her character is a commitment-phobe and she told a TV Week writer "The reason she goes to Malcolm is purely to gain some sort of control back in her life because everything's spiralling out of control due to these feelings she has for Kyle. Her default position is to go back to what she knows - which is to hook up with men who won't want anything serious, like taken men or people who are up for a one-night stand. He's like a safety harness really." Malcolm and Jade's affair comes to an end when Karl Kennedy (Alan Fletcher) finds out about it. Jade does not appear to be fussed about the end of the affair and Malcolm is left "a little rattled" by her reaction.

==== Troy Miller ====
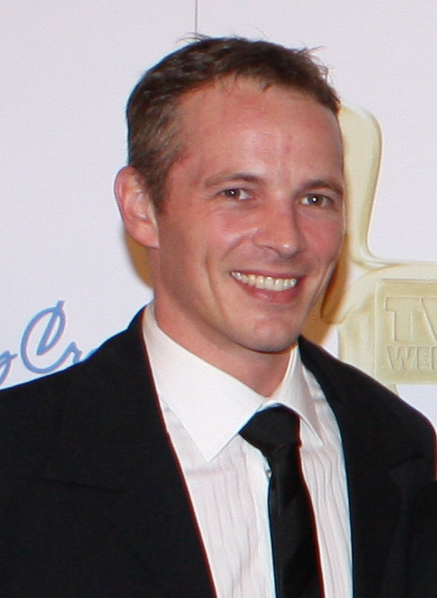
In 2012, it emerged that Jade had been in an abusive relationship with Troy Miller (Dieter Brummer (pictured)).

In late 2011, Jade opened up to Kyle about her past and revealed that she had been in a relationship with an abusive man. Pranita revealed to Geoff Shearer of The Courier-Mail that Jade's ex would be introduced to the show in the new year. When Troy Miller (Dieter Brummer) returned to Ramsay Street in May 2012, Jade appeared "horrified" at his reappearance and in "an explosive development" it was revealed that he was her abusive ex-boyfriend. Claire Crick from All About Soap commented that Troy "stooped to a new low" when he seemed almost proud of the fact that he was once "heavy-handed" with Jade. Crick went on to say "We're so used to seeing Jade as the feisty fitness freak who's always in control, but Troy clearly has a hold over her that no one else has. She's still terrified of her ex, and it seems she's got good reason to be. We always knew he was a bad egg, but who'd have thought he was nasty enough to hurt his girlfriend?" Pranita explained that she had to some research into domestic, physical and emotional violence for the storyline, as she had never been in an abusive relationship.

Troy was Sonya's ex-boyfriend and the biological father of Callum. He returned to try and win custody of his son. After Callum confronts his father about reneging on a deal they had, Troy snaps and refuses to let him leave his house. Both Sonya and Jade become anxious at the development and eventually burst through the door and get Callum out, but Troy then locks them inside. Pranita revealed "Jade is taking on the very protective auntie role of looking after Callum. But she also knows Callum has no idea about how much of an untamed wild animal Troy is. Now, locked in the house with, she feels this is history repeating itself. Jade loathes Troy more now than she ever has." The actress found the scenes were some of the toughest she has ever shot, as they were unlike the normal drama they usually filmed. She called the storyline "intense" and found it harder than normal to let go of it when she went home. Pranita later stated that the Troy storyline had been her most difficult storyline to film during her time on Neighbours.

=== Departure and return ===
On 8 June 2012, Fiona Byrne of the Herald Sun reported Pranita would be departing Neighbours. Byrne revealed that the actress had been offered a contract extension, but she had decided to leave. Pranita stated "The decision was made with a heavy heart as I love this job, but I just felt that two years was long enough to play one character. I became an actor to play lots of different characters and, while Jade has been an amazing role, I feel I want to challenge myself to do other things." She explained that she had enjoyed working on Neighbours that she would miss her co-stars, in particular Milligan and Morey. The actress took a break at the end of June to spend time with her boyfriend, before filming Jade's departure storyline. Pranita filmed her final scenes on 9 August. Pranita teased that "hearts will be broken and lots tears will be shed" when Jade leaves, while executive producer Richard Jasek revealed Jade would be presented with an amazing opportunity.

Jade is given the chance to work in the United States and she and Kyle begin a long-distance relationship. On her return, Jade asks Kyle to accompany her. However, after Kyle learns that she is going back to the US for a year, he states that his life is in Erinsborough. He then breaks up with Jade. When asked if her heart went out to Kyle, Pranita said "Of course. I'm someone who has been in a long-distance relationship myself. I think it's always harder being the person who's left behind, since the other person is on a new crusade and adventure. Kyle and Jade have this awful, mutual break-up where they're both crying." Jade departed on 29 October 2012.

In late 2018, Pranita was spotted on the set of Neighbours, leading to speculation that she was returning for Morey's exit storyline. The show officially confirmed Pranita had reprised her role on 18 February 2019, and her scenes began airing from 1 March. Jade returns to Erinsborough to reconnect with her family, after learning that Sonya has been diagnosed with ovarian cancer.

== Storylines ==
Jade comes to Erinsborough to visit her estranged sister Sonya and mend their relationship. Jade drags Sonya out for a drink and ends up kissing Sonya's friend Lucas Fitzgerald. When Jade tells Sonya she has nowhere else to go, Sonya allows her to stay with her. Jade starts teaching yoga at the local gym, and befriends Kate Ramsay and Donna Freedman. When she gets in trouble for flashing at Charlie's bar, Sonya tells her to leave. Zeke Kinski (Matthew Werkmeister) invites Jade to stay next door at the Kennedy house. When Sonya's partner, Toadfish Rebecchi, returns home, Sonya is forced to introduce Jade to him and his son, Callum. Jade then realises that Callum is Sonya's son and threatens to tell him the truth. But once she sees how happy Callum is, she decides to keep Sonya's secret and moves in with her sister. Jade clashes with Toadie several times, but their relationship improves when they discover they have a mutual love of board games. When Callum's great-grandmother dies, it prompts him to try to find his mother. Callum eventually learns Sonya is his mother, and Jade comforts her sister when Toadie throws them out.

Jade asks Kyle Canning to help her attract female gym clients, but has to fire him when he is late for a meeting with a client. Jade has a one-night stand with Kate's ex-boyfriend, Mark Brennan, and Kate ends their friendship. They later make up when Jade apologises. Jade agrees to move in with Kyle at Number 26. During their housewarming party, Kyle and Jade kiss, but Jade is disappointed when Kyle says it did not mean anything. Michelle Tran (HaiHa Le) moves in to the spare room, but she soon annoys Jade and Kyle. Jade and Kyle have sex and enter into a friends with benefits arrangement. Michelle later exposes Jade and Kyle's arrangement to Sonya and Lucas. Kyle then invites Rhys Lawson (Ben Barber) to move in. Kyle admits that he has feelings for Jade, but she rejects him. She later has an affair with Malcolm Kennedy, despite knowing he is married.

Jade is touched when Kyle gives her a handmade photo frame for Christmas and she opens up to him about her abusive ex-boyfriend and her commitment issues. The moment is ruined when Kyle learns of her affair with Malcolm. When Jade tells Kyle that she loves him, he walks away and she decides to leave. Just before she boards a coach to Sydney, Kyle finds her and tells her he loves her too. When Jade needs to boost her business, she comes up with the idea for a singles boot camp. Kyle asks Jade to move into his room, but she states that she is not ready although she does love him. Kyle's grandmother, Sheila (Colette Mann), arrives and make it clear that she does not think Jade is the right girl for Kyle.

Lawyer Charlotte McKemmie (Meredith Penman) tells Jade that she has some clients who are looking to franchise her singles boot camp idea. Sonya's ex-partner, Troy Miller, moves onto Ramsay Street and when Jade confronts him, it emerges that Troy was her abusive ex-boyfriend. Jade explains that she has medical records proving that he hit her and she gives them to Toadie to help his custody case. Jade explains to Sonya and Kyle that she was young and lonely when she fell for Troy. Jade later gives evidence at a mediation meeting. Troy locks Callum in his house and Jade and Sonya manage to get him out, before being locked in themselves. As Troy explains that he just wants to spend time with his son, Jade punches him in the stomach and she and Sonya escape. Troy ends up in hospital with a head injury and he claims that Jade attacked him. The police come to question Jade and she realises that she could face manslaughter charges if Troy dies. Troy regains consciousness and tells the police that Jade was not responsible for his injuries. Troy later dies and Jade admits that she is relieved.

Kate tells Jade that she and Kyle kissed, and a devastated Jade orders Kyle to leave the house. Sheila later apologises to Jade for encouraging Kate to go after Kyle. Jade is touched when Kyle organises a party for her and when one of her clients asks her out, she turns him down as she is not over Kyle. She then admits to Kyle that she still loves him and they get back together. Jade purchases Lou Carpenter's (Tom Oliver) share of Kyle's business and demonstrates her skill in negotiating a lower price from hardware suppliers. Jade learns that some potential investors from the United States want to buy the rights to her singles boot camp franchise, and she decides to go to Los Angeles for six months to sort out the deal. Jade returns home a couple of times to see Kyle and Sonya. She later tells Kyle that she has been offered the chance to stay in Los Angeles for a year and he decides to break up with her, as he cannot leave Erinsborough. Jade thinks about staying, but Kyle tells her that she has to go and Jade leaves for Los Angeles. She later relocates to San Francisco, and looks after Callum when he moves out there.

Jade returns to Erinsborough seven years later to spend time with Sonya, who has been diagnosed with stage four ovarian cancer. Jade tells Sonya that her business is doing well and they talk about the upcoming family beach house trip. Jade asks Sonya about possible complementary treatments to help with her chemotherapy, and then runs a mindfulness session for the family. Sonya dies during the beach trip, and Jade travels with the children to Colac so they can be with Toadie's parents. She attends Sonya's memorial at Lassiters Lake, and she thanks Lucas for his role in reuniting her with Sonya.

== Reception ==
Upon Jade's introduction, a reporter from the Daily Record said she "looks like she's set to cause some trouble." Alan Fletcher (who plays Karl Kennedy) praised Pranita's addition to the cast. David Barnsby, writing for television magazine TV Buzz, commented that anything is possible with Jade because she is such a "live wire." A writer for Holy Soap said Jade's most memorable moment was "When she found out Callum's name and realised he was Sonya's son." Another writer for the website branded her a "serial flirt." Following her one-night stand with Mark, Sarah Ellis of Inside Soap said that Jade would be better off if she "set her sights on kind-hearted Kyle." Ellis later wondered how long Kyle and Jade's friends with benefits deal would last until they saw what the rest of the world could. Inside Soap ran a poll asking viewers to vote for their favourite soap personal trainer and Jade come second, earning 10% of the vote.

Tess Larnacraft from TV Buzz questioned whether Jade and Kyle would ever get together and said she could not "keep watching them skirt around each other for much longer." During a feature on soap couples that should be together, another Inside Soap columnist said Kyle should give up lusting after Kate and realise Jade is "The One." They opined that while neither of them have had a relationship for more than twenty four hours, it does put them on an even playing field. Cameron Adams of the Herald Sun later called Jade and Kyle's relationship "bumby" and he said Jade is an "Alpha female" whose kryptonite is Valentine's Day. During Troy's return storyline, the Daily Record's Sarah Morgan commented "Jade is a woman on a mission - to get Troy out of her family's life once and for all. Although we can understand why she's driven to punch him in the face, we hadn't realised how tough she is as, with one swipe of her fist, he ends up in a coma." Dianne Butler, writing for the Herald Sun, branded the character "Alpha Jade".
