= Callum Rebecchi =

Fictional character from Neighbours

- Neighbours character
- Portrayed by: Morgan Baker
- Duration: 2008–2015, 2017, 2019, 2022–2023
- First appearance: 9 June 2008
- Last appearance: 13 November 2023
- Introduced by: Ric Pellizzeri and Susan Bower (2008); Jason Herbison (2015)
- Spin-off appearances: Pipe Up (2017); Neighbours vs Time Travel (2017)
In-universe information
- Other names: Callum Jones
- Occupation: Student; Cleaner; Paperboy; Garden nursery worker; Game coder
- Father: Troy Miller
- Mother: Sonya Rebecchi
- Adoptive father: Toadie Rebecchi
- Half-brothers: Hugo Somers (adoptive)
- Half-sisters: Nell Rebecchi
- Grandfathers: Walter Mitchell; Kevin Rebecchi
- Grandmothers: Fiona Mitchell; Angie Rebecchi
- Uncles: Shane Rebecchi; Stonefish Rebecchi
- Aunts: Jade Mitchell
- First cousins: Yashvi Rebecchi; Kirsha Rebecchi
- Other relatives: Hilda Jones; Robyn Lovell; Hayden Lovell; Georgia Brooks; Gemma Reeves

Callum Rebecchi (also Jones) is a fictional character from the Australian soap opera Neighbours played by actor Morgan Baker. He made his first screen appearance during the episode broadcast on 9 June 2008. The character was introduced to the show following the decision to stop a storyline that saw Toadfish Rebecchi adopt a child from Indonesia. Baker began filming his first scenes in March. Callum departed Neighbours on 12 June 2014, following Baker's decision to concentrate on his schooling. Baker reprised the role for a cameo appearance on 17 September 2015. He has made subsequent guest appearances from 7 June until 12 June 2017 and again from 20 February until 13 March 2019. In 2022 it was announced that Baker would once again reprise the role as part of the series finale.

Callum was initially portrayed as a tearaway, who created chaos to be noticed. He is also smart, funny and cunning. Callum has had to grow up quickly and he has become "very emotionally mature". In a major storyline for the character, it was revealed that Toadie's partner, Sonya Mitchell (Eve Morey), was Callum's biological mother. Other storylines have seen Callum develop a romantic relationship with Rani Kapoor (Coco Cherian), befriending Bailey Turner (Calen Mackenzie) and dating Josie Lamb (Madison Daniel). Callum has received a mixed reaction from critics of the serial. Some praised him for his honesty, while others said he is too "brattish".

== Creation and casting ==
The character of Callum was introduced to Neighbours after producers decided to stop a storyline which saw Toadie (Ryan Moloney) try to adopt an Indonesian child illegally. In 2008, viewers saw Toadie trying to adopt an East Timorese orphan, after claiming that he had lived in Indonesia for 12 months. Producers decided to stop the storyline at the last minute and Toadie met Callum instead. Of the storyline Moloney said "I thought was just ridiculous. And it was just to spite Steph! I was like, 'What are we doing?'" Moloney said that having the character of Callum around is "really cool".

Baker was cast in the role of Callum and he began filming his first scenes in March 2008. The actor was 10 years old when he joined the show. Baker's filming schedule meant that occasionally he could not attend school and he had to be tutored in a classroom at the Network Ten studios. Prior to his departure in 2014, Baker was one of the longest-serving out of the show's younger cast.

== Development ==
=== Characterisation ===
Callum was initially a tearaway who stole from his neighbours and tried to stay home from school. The official Neighbours website said Callum is someone who creates chaos to be noticed. He is energetic, lively and a bit of larrikin, but under the surface he is just looking for someone to love him. The website described Callum as "smart, sharp, funny, cunning and clever." A writer for Inside Soap said Callum is a cheeky lad, who is more interested in pizza and comic books than his school work. Executive producer Susan Bower called Callum Toadie's "Mini Me." Both Toadie and Callum are fans of professional wrestling and their wrestling egos are called The Lawman and Babyface. In March 2009, professional wrestler Dave Batista made a guest appearance in Neighbours and he filmed a few scenes alongside Toadie and Callum. Following a Rebecchi family tradition, Callum was given his own aquatic nickname – Squid.

In April 2013, Baker's co-star Eve Morey explained that Callum would start to rebel against his parents in future storylines and revealed her surprise at how well adjusted Callum is. She said "I can tell you it's starting. And it's actually really good, because we're doing a few storylines now, where he's starting to explore that darker side of being a teenager. And I think that's really good for him." Morey added that Callum had to grow up quickly and be "very emotionally mature", so she was not surprised that his pent up anger begins to appear.

=== High school and career plans ===
In October 2009, Baker began shooting scenes of Callum's first week at high school. Callum finds it difficult to settle in at his new school and he finds himself "torn between his friends from Ramsay St and his new friends". Baker said "He has quite a hard time". Viewers have not seen Callum go to school before as there is not a primary school set at the Nunawading studios, where Neighbours is filmed. However, once the character joined Erinsborough High, he began to appear on the show more often and started interacting with other children his own age.

In July 2010, Callum decides that he wants to become a stand up comic, but Toadie is not happy with Callum's plans. Callum watches some gross out comedies and they inspire him to take up Comedy as his future career. Of his character's career decision, Baker said "Callum is starting to grow up and thinks he'd be quite good at being a comic". Callum is determined to "get his own way" and he discovers an open mic event for new comic performers. He sneaks into the venue and gets onto the stage. Baker told Inside Soap that Callum "soon gets sprung" as Lucas Fitzgerald (Scott Major) and Michael Williams (Sandy Winton) are also at the event. For the storyline Australian comedian, Lehmo, filmed a guest role with the show, which saw Callum upstage him.

=== Mother ===
In January 2011, it was revealed that Sonya Mitchell (Morey) is Callum's biological mother. Sonya's sister, Jade (Gemma Pranita) is shocked when she discovers that Sonya is keeping the truth from both Callum and Toadie. Morey said that since Sonya arrived, there has not been any indication that she is Callum's mother. Both Morey and Moloney thought that the storyline could be possible and Morey chose to research how other people had reacted to similar situations. Morey told the show's official website that Sonya entered Callum's life, not to get him back, but to see if he was okay. When TV Week asked how it is possible that Callum would not remember his mother, Morey explained "We did have to look at that, but he's never known much about his mother. His great-grandmother raised him and never gave him much information since she was so disappointed in Sonya, who had Callum at 16. I also think Callum's blocked out any image he had of her, who he hasn't seen for many years." Morey said Sonya had become addicted to alcohol and drugs, when she had Callum and she chose to leave him, so she could get herself cleaned up.

Morey stated that Sonya did not feel like she deserved to be Callum's mother because she hated the person she used to be. She thinks that it is better if Callum knows her like she is now. Executive producer Susan Bower defended the storyline when she was asked why the writers had rewritten Sonya and Callum's history. She told Inside Soap that they worked with the character's established backgrounds and found reasons and motivations for Sonya to act the way she did. However, she added that the only discrepancy that could be pointed out was Callum's age. When Callum's great-grandmother dies, Sonya becomes concerned that her secret will be revealed because Callum wants to attend the funeral. However, Callum chooses not to attend the funeral as he wants to say goodbye to his great-grandmother privately. Callum later explains to Sonya that he wants to find his mother and tell her that he hates her. Morey revealed that the truth about Sonya was going to be exposed in April 2011. Callum steps up his investigation into the identity of his mother and he is injured in an accident and rushed to hospital, where he recalls a memory about his mother and realises that she is Sonya.

=== Relationships ===
==== Rani Kapoor ====
On 13 May 2012, Susan Hill of the Daily Star reported Callum would develop his first crush on his classmate, Rani Kapoor (Coco Cherian). Hill stated that Callum would be "heading for one of the most embarrassing times of his life" when Toadie and Sonya find out about it. Callum tells Toadie about his crush and he receives some "man-to-man" advice from him. However, Toadie then tells Sonya, who tries to help Callum by hiring Rani to work at her nursery alongside him. A show spokesperson told Hill "Callum's cringing and embarrassed and doesn't know how he's going to get through each day working with Rani. And Callum is not at all happy about Toadie spilling the beans." Callum continues to carry "a torch" for Rani and spends months trying to "pluck up courage" to tell her how he feels about her. However, he is heartbroken when he catches her kissing Harley Canning (Justin Holborow) and learns that they are dating. Cherian commented "Rani's a little bit blind to the fact that Callum likes her so much. She hasn't picked up on anything." Instead of giving up on Rani, Callum decides to turn himself into "a bit of a bad boy like Harley" to get her to notice him. Hill reported that Rani is not sure what has got into Callum and commented "Whether or not Callum's tactic works remains to be seen."

When Bailey Turner (Calen Mackenzie) moves into Ramsay Street, Callum immediately warns him off pursuing Rani. Mackenzie commented that while it was hard for Bailey to back off, as he really liked Rani, he did not want to break the code by stealing her away from Callum. Rani becomes torn between the two boys and eventually shares a kiss with Bailey while they are rehearsing for a school play. Callum is "devastated" when he finds out what happened and asks Rani to end her friendship with Bailey, which she does. Following his ultimatum, Callum "tries desperately" to ignore the tension between Rani and Bailey. However, it gets too much for him when he sees Rani and Bailey talking by the pool and he begins a fight with Bailey. Callum pushes Bailey, who hits his head, loses consciousness and falls into the pool. Rani manages to snap Callum into action and he jumps in and pulls Bailey out.

==== Imogen Willis ====
In August 2013, Hill reported that Callum would develop "a huge crush" on his older neighbour Imogen Willis (Ariel Kaplan), but would likely get his heart broken again. Callum goes as far as to tell his parents that he has a girlfriend, even though Imogen is not aware of his feelings for her. However, things get bad for Callum when Bailey tells Imogen, as he worries about Callum getting hurt. A spokesperson stated "Imogen is due to attend a dinner where Callum will be present. He can't wait for the big night as he's planning to confess how he feels. But Imogen then decides she can't be at the dinner as she doesn't want to face Callum."

==== Josie Lamb ====
Callum later befriends Josie Lamb (Madison Daniel). Josie develops her own crush on Callum, but when she learns that he likes Imogen, Josie decides to try and change herself to be more like Imogen. Josie begins exercising hard to impress Callum and she later signs up for the local fun run. During the race, Josie goes to see Callum and Bailey at the drinks stand, but when they ignore her, she decides to keep running without getting herself a drink. A combination of dehydration, not eating and her vigorous exercise routine cause Josie to collapse and she is taken to hospital. Callum feels guilty and blames himself. He later realises that he does have feelings for Josie and asks her to the school dance. Daniel commented "Callum doesn't take much notice of Josie until she's in hospital, so she thinks he's only invited her to the dance out of pity."

Daniel added that Josie would rather go to the dance with someone who wants to be with her, not someone who feels sorry for her. However, that is not the case and Callum tries to convince Josie that he genuinely likes her. Baker called Josie "a strong character" and said she has an influence over Callum. He also admitted that the couple have fun together and that he loved playing out a successful relationship. On the future of their romance, Baker added, "Callum has also been with his girlfriend Josie for a few months now, and they've kind of reached a key point in the relationship – the 'next' step, and while they've been very calm and genuine about it, Sonya and Toadie are a little shocked, to say the least."

=== Departure and returns ===
In April 2014, Baker announced that he had decided to leave Neighbours to focus on his schooling full-time. A show spokesperson told Daniel Kilkelly from Digital Spy, "Morgan has made the very mature decision to focus on his final years at high school and while we will all miss him enormously, we also commend him for making this move. He has established himself as an incredibly talented young actor." The spokesperson added that Baker would be welcome back any time. Baker later thanked his fans for their support and said he would not be giving up on acting. Callum departed on 12 June 2014.

The character's exit storyline saw him leave for a scholarship in Silicon Valley, after designing an award-winning app. Sonya was initially reluctant to let him go, but she eventually relented and threw him a going-away party in the street. Callum was saddened when Josie decided to break up with him, as she does not want a long distance relationship. Callum later persuaded Josie to stay with him until he got on the plane the following day. They also stayed in the same room together for the first time. Callum then said a final goodbye to his friends and family before he headed to the airport.

Baker reprised his role for a cameo appearance on 17 September 2015. Callum was shown via an online video call to his parents and Karl Kennedy (Alan Fletcher) from his bedroom in the United States. In late January 2017, Moloney revealed Callum would be returning that year, during the aftermath of a storyline that focuses on the apparent return of Toadie's first wife Dee Bliss (Madeleine West). Callum returned on 7 June. In late 2018, Baker was spotted on the set of Neighbours, leading to speculation that Callum would be returning for a guest appearance. He returned during the episode broadcast on 20 February 2019, following his mother's cancer diagnosis.

On 7 May 2022, Dan Seddon of Digital Spy announced Baker would reprise the role as part of the show's final episodes to be broadcast later that year. Baker made a surprise return to the serial as Callum in 2023 during the serial's reboot episode premiere. He returns to see Toadie marry Terese Willis (Rebekah Elmaloglou). His return was kept secret up to the episode's broadcast in order to cover Terese and Toadie's marriage.

== Storylines ==
Callum was raised by his elderly great-grandparents from the age of six. Following the death of her husband, Callum's great-grandmother, Hilda (Maureen Edwards), became a cleaner for Stephanie Scully (Carla Bonner), who offers to introduce Callum to her friend Toadie, so he can have a male influence in his life. Toadie and Callum spend the day bonding over their mutual love of wrestling. When Toadie takes Callum home, they find Hilda has collapsed. While she is admitted to hospital, Toadie allows Callum to stay with him. Toadie leaves Callum with his neighbour Susan Kennedy (Jackie Woodburne), while he works. Callum takes Susan's phone during a walk in the park and he starts taking other items from the neighbours. He also tricks Toadie into letting him stay home from school. When Toadie finds the stolen items, Callum explains that he needs to sell them, so he can get some money and look after himself. Toadie explains that he will take care of Callum if anything happens to Hilda. Callum is accused of starting bushland fire, when Steph finds a lighter in his pocket. Jay Duncan (Charlie Clausen) suggests that Callum should take part in a Fire and Intervention Awareness program and he is deemed unlikely to commit arson.

When Nicola West (Imogen Bailey) moves in, Callum takes a shine to her and he takes some pictures of her to school. His teacher Kelly Katsis (Katrina Milosevic) comes to talk to Toadie about his behaviour. After Nicola is arrested, Callum starts acting out at school. He smashes up Nicola's car and Toadie decides that he is better off staying with his great-aunt, Robyn (Patricia Pitney). When Robyn realises Callum is homesick, she asks Toadie to come and collect him. Callum is diagnosed with amblyopia and he has to wear an eye patch and glasses for a brief time. Callum has an argument with Toadie on the day they receive a visit from DHS worker, Roz Challis (Janet Watson Kruse). Callum leaves the house, but later returns and Roz tells Toadie that Callum can stay with him. Callum's friend, Mickey (Fletcher O'Leary), finds a bag of money and they try to keep it a secret. However, the police find out about it, as does Guy Sykes (Fletcher Humphrys). Guy holds Toadie and Callum hostage in their house overnight. Toadie eventually tackles Guy, who is arrested. Callum and Toadie's dog, Bob, becomes ill and has to be put down. Toadie then gets Callum a Labrador puppy called Rocky, who needs to be trained as a guide dog.

Sonya Mitchell comes to check on Rocky's progress and Callum encourages Toadie to ask her out. He befriends Sophie Ramsay (Kaiya Jones) and they start high school together. Callum is initially bullied by Dean Harman (Cameron Heine), but he later befriends him and his friends. When they start bullying Sophie, Callum decides to leave them. Callum accepts Toadie's renewed relationship with Steph, after she explains that she does not want to come between him and Toadie. Callum reacts angrily when he learns Toadie and Steph's relationship was just a cover to stop Steph's infidelity with her best friend's husband coming out. Lou Carpenter (Tom Oliver) tries to help and he gives Callum a job cleaning his used car yard. Callum teases Sophie when he realises she has a crush on Zeke Kinski (Matthew Werkmeister) and they fall out. Callum later apologises and they reconcile. Hilda dies and Callum states that he wants to find his mother. In a bid to trigger his memories, Callum returns to Hilda's house and then an old warehouse. He is crushed in an accident and ends up in hospital, where he wakes up and identifies Sonya as his mother. She confirms that it is true and Toadie tries to keep Callum away from her.

After talking with Paul Robinson (Stefan Dennis), Callum goes to see Sonya and asks her questions about his past. Callum continues meeting Sonya in secret and he tries to make her promise not to relapse, but Sonya explains that she cannot do that. Callum meets his biological father, Troy Miller (Dieter Brummer), and gets on well with him. Toadie and Sonya get back together, which angers Troy. He punches Toadie and shouts at Callum, causing him to hate his father. Callum becomes obsessed with an online role-playing game called Dragon Prophecies. When he exceeds the monthly broadband usage allowance, Sonya and Toadie force him to get a job to help pay for an upgraded service. Following a stint as a paperboy, Sonya gives Callum a job in her garden nursery. Callum befriends Rani Kapoor and Sophie becomes jealous of their friendship. She tries to turn them against each other and Callum and Rani pretend to fancy each other to get their revenge. Sophie works out what it going on and she apologises to them. Callum realises he has a real crush on Rani. Troy returns and purchases Number 32. Wanting to be a part of Callum's life, he hires Rani's father to help him get custody.

Callum tells Troy that he will spend time with him, but only if he drops the custody case and an intervention order against Toadie. When Callum learns Troy has only dropped the custody case, he confronts him in his house. Troy locks him in and tells him to hear him out. Sonya and her sister, Jade, manage to get Callum out of the house, but Troy holds them hostage instead. Troy later trips and sustains a serious head injury. When Troy wakes up, he goes to the school to get Callum. After a confrontation, Troy leaves and dies at the wheel of his car. Only Callum and Toadie attend his funeral. Upon learning Rani is dating Harley Canning, Callum tries to change his image to get her to notice him. Callum continues to compete with Harley for Rani's affections. Callum befriends Bailey Turner and quickly warns him off pursuing Rani. When Rani thanks Callum for his support, following her mother's death, Callum asks her out on a date. They soon begin dating and Rani casts Callum in her play. Callum is devastated when Rani admits to kissing Bailey. Callum and Bailey fight in the street and Callum destroys the set for Rani's play. Callum drops out of the play, but when Rani rewrites the ending to tell him how sorry she is, he changes his mind.

Callum asks Rani to stop being friends with Bailey and she agrees. But when Callum finds Rani talking to Bailey, he becomes angry and fights with Bailey again. Bailey trips, hits his head and falls into the pool. Callum rescues Bailey and feels guilty at what has happened. Callum gives Rani and Bailey his blessing for them to date, but struggles to accept their relationship. Both Bailey and Callum are sad when Rani leaves Erinsborough. Callum develops a crush on Imogen Willis and hopes she will turn up to his 16th birthday party. However, Bailey admits that he told Imogen about Callum's crush and they briefly fall out. Callum soon befriends Josie Lamb, who he has more in common with. Callum is disappointed when Josie tells him that she can no longer hang out with him. He soon learns that her mother is a detective, who is in charge of an investigation, for which Toadie is the prime suspect. Callum suspects Josie only befriended him, so she could spy for her mother. Josie insists that is not the case and they eventually make up. Callum continues to harbour a crush on Imogen, which does not go unnoticed by Josie, who begins to change her image to match Imogen's.

Sonya encourages Callum to talk to Josie and tell her that he likes her just the way she is. A couple of weeks later, Josie collapses during a fun run and is taken to hospital. When Callum learns that Josie has made herself ill trying to look like Imogen, he realises that he has treated Josie badly and asks her to the school dance. Josie turns him down, which hurts Callum, much to his surprise. Josie decides to go to the dance, but leaves when she sees Callum and Imogen dancing together. However, Callum catches up with her and they share their first kiss. Callum goes on a school trip to China for a few weeks. Callum falls out with Josie when she suggests there is an attraction between Jacob Holmes (Clayton Watson) and Sonya. Callum apologises and buys her a puppy, but she has to return it as she is allergic. Callum tries to keep the puppy, but Toadie makes him sell it. When Stephen Montague (Damian Hill) escapes from the police, he hides in Number 32's shed with Callum. Callum manages to get Montague to go into his house, where he hits him over the head and escapes, allowing the police to arrest Montague. Callum creates a mobile game, featuring a girl that looks like Imogen. Josie becomes jealous and accuses Callum of still having feelings for Imogen. Callum and Josie resolve their differences and they declare their love for one another. Sonya and Toadie find a condom in Callum's bag, and he tells his father that he and Josie are ready to take their relationship to the next level. Susan enters Callum's app into a youth design competition and he wins a scholarship based in Silicon Valley, but Sonya refuses to let him go. Sonya later relents and Callum leaves for California, after spending the night in the same room as Josie.

When Toadie is paralysed after an accident, Callum considers flying home to help out, but Toadie tells him to stay in California. Off-screen, Callum offers to donate bone marrow to Sonya's half-sister Zoe (Nicola Billie Gullotti), who is suffering from leukaemia. In 2017, Toadie brings Callum back to Australia after Sonya's relapse. Callum encourages her to move back home, asking her not to give up on Nell like she did him. Soon after, he returns to California, but encourages his parents to work on their separation. Two years later, Callum's aunt Dipi Rebecchi (Sharon Johal) informs him that Sonya is fighting Stage 4 ovarian cancer. He returns during a charity fundraiser for Sonya's treatment. Sonya is initially upset by Callum's return but comes to realise she needs her family around her during treatment. Her condition deteriorates and she dies during a family trip to the beach. After Sonya's memorial, Callum is determined to support Toadie but risks losing his job if he does not return to California. Toadie decides that the family should accompany Callum and continue grieving for Sonya together. Three years later, Callum returns to attend his father's wedding to Melanie Pearson (Lucinda Cowden) and goes to their reception and party on Ramsay Street afterwards. He later returns when Toadie marries Terese Willis.

== Reception ==
For his portrayal of Callum, Baker was nominated for Best Newcomer at the 2009 Inside Soap Awards. Of Callum's most memorable moment, a Holy Soap writer said "After almost being killed by a falling tree in the bush, Callum came under suspicion for starting a devastating fire. Luckily, the real culprit was finally caught". Ruth Deller of television website Lowculture praised the character of Callum, calling him a "decent addition to Ramsay Street". She added "For the first time, they've found a kid who's actually not too bad. He isn't as goody-goody or out and out brattish as most Erinsborough young, perhaps because he's not actually related to any of the neighbours". In July 2010, Deller again praised the character saying "Callum has since established himself as one of the best characters on Ramsay Street, who always sees things with a more realistic/honest/sarcastic perspective than his neighbours. The best storyline of the Aussie soap this year was when he teamed up with the best character on the Street, Paul Robinson, and Paul started teaching him about machiavelli. This, not silly storylines about dancing and shrugaleros, is what we want". Rebecca Lake from TV Week disliked Callum and Josie's relationship, branding it a "dull romance". In 2015, a Herald Sun reporter included Sonya being revealed as Callum's mother in their "Neighbours' 30 most memorable moments" feature.
