= The Ever After =

- Directed by: Mark Webber
- Screenplay by: Teresa Palmer; Mark Webber
- Produced by: Mark Binns; Teresa Palmer; Mark Webber
- Starring: Teresa Palmer; Rosario Dawson; Melissa Leo; Mark Webber
- Cinematography: Patrice Lucien Cochet
- Edited by: Sven Pape
- Release date: June 12, 2014
- Running time: 87 minutes
- Country: United States
- Language: English

The Ever After is a 2014 American drama film directed by Mark Webber and starring Teresa Palmer, Rosario Dawson, Melissa Leo, and Webber.

== Cast ==
- Teresa Palmer as Ava
- Rosario Dawson as herself
- Phoebe Tonkin as Mabel
- Mark Webber as Thomas
- Melissa Leo
- Joshua Leonard as Christian
- Scott Mescudi as Scott
- Tom Bower as Father O'Meara
- Tahyna Tozzi as Ms. Sanders
- Korrina Rico as Geraldine
- Luke Baines as himself
- Kiersten Hall as Sveltlana
- Gemma Pranita as Naja
- Brooke Stone as Brooke

== Reception ==
Charlie Schmidlin of IndieWire gave the film a B−.
