= Lucas Fitzgerald =

Fictional character from the Australian soap opera Neighbours

- Neighbours character
- Portrayed by: Scott Major; Julian Mineo (2011 flashback)
- Duration: 2008–2013, 2015–2017, 2019, 2021–2022, 2024–2025
- First appearance: 22 July 2008
- Last appearance: 11 December 2025
- Introduced by: Susan Bower (2008); Jason Herbison (2015)
In-universe information
- Other names: George Hanson
- Occupation: Mechanic; Photographer; Technical teacher; Owner of Fitzgerald Motors
- Father: Patrick Fitzgerald
- Brothers: Daniel Fitzgerald
- Wife: Vanessa Villante
- Children: 3
- Sons: Patrick Villante
- Daughters: Sebastiana
- Nephews: Adam Fitzgerald

Lucas Fitzgerald is a fictional character from the Australian soap opera Neighbours, played by Scott Major. The actor had previously appeared in Neighbours in 1993 as Darren Stark. He received a call to play Lucas shortly after he was getting the feel for acting again. Major accepted the role as the character seemed like fun and he wanted to work with his friend Brett Tucker. He made his first screen appearance as Lucas during the episode broadcast on 22 July 2008. The following year, Major signed a new contract and was promoted to the regular cast. On 1 July 2013, it was confirmed that Lucas had been written out of Neighbours and he departed on 24 September 2013. Major remained with the series as a director, and Lucas made numerous guest appearances from 2015 until 2025.

Lucas is Daniel Fitzgerald's (Brett Tucker) brother. He has been portrayed as being cheeky, a bit of a "bad boy", a rebel and a ladies man. His storylines have included re-connecting with his brother, fighting a gambling addiction, developing relationships with Elle Robinson (Pippa Black), Stephanie Scully (Carla Bonner), Emilia Jovanovic (Freya Stafford) and Vanessa Villante (Alin Sumarwata) being injured in a motorbike accident, getting involved in illegal street racing, becoming a father and being diagnosed with testicular cancer. For his portrayal of Lucas, Major received a nomination for Best Daytime Star at the 2013 Inside Soap Awards. Lucas returned for the final episodes on 11 December 2025.

== Casting ==
Scott Major received the call to join the cast of Neighbours not long after he had returned home to Australia, after working overseas. He had previously appeared in the show as Darren Stark in 1993. Wanting to get back into acting, Major agreed to play the role of Lucas. He stated: "It's a different character and it seemed like it could be a lot of fun. In Australia as an actor, to get a regular show it's really hard". Major also attributed the chance to work with Brett Tucker, whom he had known for about ten years, as one of the reasons why he accepted the part. In 2009, Major signed a two-year contract and was promoted to the regular cast. In November 2011, Major told Daniel Kilkelly of Digital Spy that he would like to stay with Neighbours as long as he keeps enjoying it. He said "At the moment, I still love working on the show and look forward to coming to work every day. I have a ball. I keep my outside interests active as well, which keeps me fresh." That same year saw Julian Mineo play a five-year-old Lucas in flashbacks.

== Development ==
=== Characterisation and introduction ===
A writer for Network Ten described the character as being a bit of a "bad boy" who is always the life of the party. They also stated that he loves "being a hero to his mates", but underneath he is a sensitive guy. A Holy Soap reporter called Lucas cheeky, cocky and "a ladies' man." Major branded Lucas a great character to play, saying "He's got all the right elements that I'd want in a character, he doesn't take anything too serious. It's really fun". As Lucas rides a motorbike, Major had to get a motorbike licence, so he could accurately portray this element of his character. An Inside Soap columnist quipped that Lucas was a "typical Aussie bloke-next door." They said that if anyone needs a job doing, then Lucas would do it well and throw a few jokes in while he works.

Lucas is not a stranger to hard work and he is employed as both a mechanic and a teacher. Major believed that Lucas would always be a rebel, saying "I think Lucas would like to think he could be on the straight and narrow, but there is always going to be something in him that will push him toward something more edgy." In July 2011, executive producer, Susan Bower, called Lucas a "gorgeous, blue-collar larrikin." A few months later, Major revealed viewers had not seen the last of Lucas's edgier side, which he said was "not pretty." Of what he has liked about playing Lucas, Major quipped "I like the fact Lucas does stupid things. I think that's very real. He acts first and goes from the heart and messes up big time. He says stupid things and gets jealous. He should probably learn from his mistakes! I'm really fond of Lucas." The actor added that there was nothing big that he disliked about his character.

Lucas' identity was initially kept secret upon his introduction, and Major called him "a mystery man". He arrives in Erinsborough with a motorbike touring team for whom he works. He was given an immediate love interest in the form of established character Libby Kennedy (Kym Valentine). Lucas and Libby meet at the local bar, Charlie's, but he fails to secure a date with her leading to his friends playing a joke on him. Major commented "It's only when he later gets tied to a lamp post outside that she pays him attention." Major admitted that the scenes, filmed on his first day, were "pretty embarrassing". Libby agrees to go on a date with Lucas, and they end up talking until the sun comes up. They arrange a second date, but after Lucas sees Libby talking to another Erinsborough resident, his interest in her changes. An Inside Soap writer noted that Lucas and the other character obviously had an "unpleasant history". Major added that Lucas seeing Libby is a complete coincidence, but he when it comes to the second date, Lucas does not show up, leaving her confused. It later emerges that Lucas is Daniel Fitzgerald's (Brett Tucker) brother. Their fictional backstory explains that their troubled relationship stems from a near-fatal motorbike accident that occurred when they were younger. Dan ran Lucas off the road and Lucas was left with the assumption that Dan had done it intentionally. Lucas then battled a gambling addiction, which ended up costing him his relationship with his then girlfriend, Natasha Curtis. Lucas became a mechanic for motorbike firm, Reyada, and also showcased photography work under the name George Hanson.

=== Relationships ===
==== Elle Robinson ====
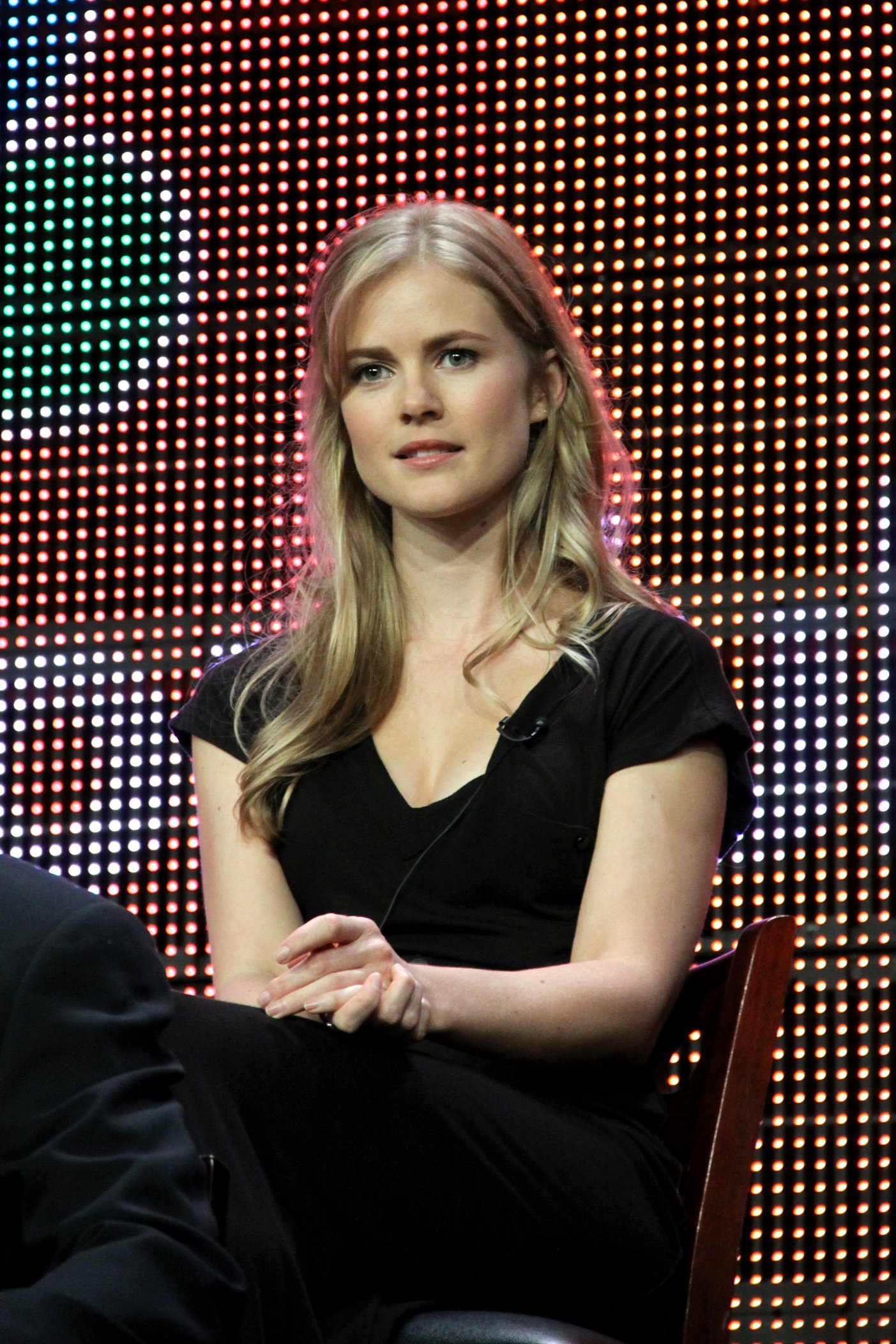
Pippa Black portrayed Elle Robinson.

Lucas begins a relationship with Elle Robinson (Pippa Black) following his failed relationship with Libby. Major said that Lucas cannot figure Elle out at first, but he is attracted to her. They are opposites and Lucas calls Elle "Princess". Major added "It's not smooth sailing for either of them, and it's still up in the air as to whether they'll finally get it together or not." Major explained that little things keep Lucas and Elle coming back to each other and that there are comedic elements to their relationship. Of Lucas and Elle, Bower commented "They're our moonlighting couple. They're chalk and cheese and they'll always be chalk and cheese". She said that they are "crazy about each other", but they are always splitting up and getting back together again. Within their relationship, Bower said that they brought in an important issue that concerns a lot of people, "how does one get an adrenalin rush?" Lucas and Elle are "high rollers", so when they get together they need to look elsewhere for their adrenalin rush.

When Elle and Lucas split because he is struggling with a gambling addiction, Elle decides to get revenge on him and invites him to her father's stag night at a casino. However, Elle is left feeling guilty about what she has done. The couple get back together, but when Elle discovers that Lucas has withdrawn a large amount of money, she worries that he has started gambling again. However, Lucas brings out a ring and proposes to Elle at the Erinsborough High Deb ball. Elle accepts, but she is late offered a job in New York and Lucas tells her to follow her dreams and they say goodbye at the airport. During an interview with Daniel Kilkelly of Digital Spy in March 2011, Major said that he missed the Lucas and Elle storylines, particularly when they both worked for the Erinsborough News. He explained "There was a lot of comedy involved but it also came across as a very deep love."

==== Stephanie Scully ====
In January 2010, Holy Soap revealed that Lucas and Stephanie Scully (Carla Bonner) would begin dating. Steph helps Lucas recover from injuries he sustains after a motorbike crash. As they spend more time together, Lucas realises that he loves Steph and he tells her about his feelings. However, he is unaware that Steph has slept with his brother and is pregnant with his child. The couple later split when the truth comes out, but Major told Holy Soap that they could get back together. Of the situation, Major said "It's definitely what Lucas is hoping for. There will be lots of obstacles along the way but hopefully they might be able to get together before she departs." One of the obstacles comes after Steph accidentally kills Ringo Brown (Sam Clark). Lucas tries to support Steph, but she pushes him away, as she sees the life she could have had with him and it is too hard for to bear. Lucas does not understand why, but Major said that he still loves her and added "They're a male and female version of each other." Holy Soap said that despite Lucas's flings with other woman, "no one quite matches up to Steph." Major explained that Lucas and Steph are soulmates and when she is placed on trial for killing Ringo, he realises that he might lose her. Major revealed that Lucas decides to act as the trial may leave him "devastated." He said "After being pushed away and pushed away by Steph, he figures that the only way he might be with her finally is to tell her how he feels." Lucas offers to go on the run with Steph, which leaves her with a "life-changing decision to make." Steph chooses not to run and she is later sent to prison.

==== Emilia Jovanovic ====
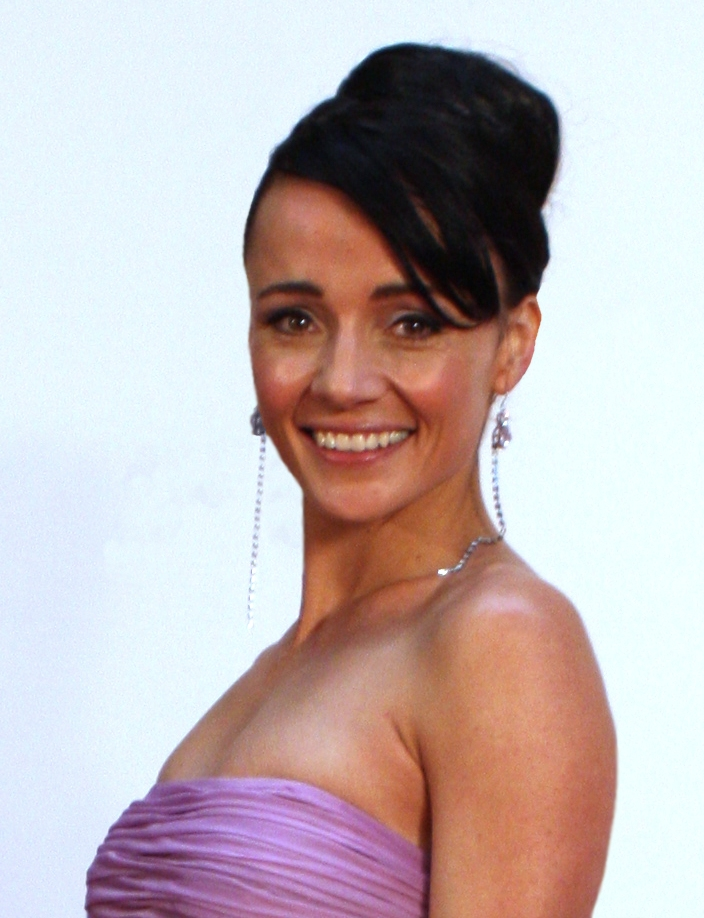
Freya Stafford portrays Emilia

In late 2011, Lucas meets a new love interest in the form of Emilia Jovanovic (Freya Stafford). Of his character's introduction to Emilia, Major explained "In their first meeting, Lucas catches Emilia on the street with her bonnet up and I don't think you could get a better intro for Lucas as an icebreaker than someone who has broken down. He's in his element and goes to the damsel in distress." Emilia has an Austin Healey Sprite, which is a car Lucas has a passion for. There is an instant connection between them and they flirt with each other. Lucas is initially unaware Emilia is Michael Williams' (Sandy Winton) sister-in-law, but Major said when he discovers how they know each other, it is not a big deal to him. Lucas is just thinks that it is great Emilia has a connection on the street. Michael warns Lucas that Emilia is bad news and Lucas takes that seriously. He puts Emilia to the test, which she passes. Major explained he was enjoying working with Stafford and thought Lucas was looking for love and stability. The actor added "He has had a rough trot so it would be nice to see him with someone he is happy with."

Lucas and Emilia's relationship progresses and they decide to give in to their "simmering passion" after sneaking into Toadfish Rebecchi's (Ryan Moloney) house. Major told Inside Soap that Emilia needs some lemongrass for a recipe and Lucas knows Toadie has some, so they let themselves in. However, Lucas forgets about the lemongrass and he engages Emilia in some "saucy fun" in the living room. Major said "It's a little bit cheeky, but it's all fun and games – until they fall back on the couch and it breaks!" Lucas and Emilia are mortified at breaking Toadie's couch, but Major said this could be the start of something serious for the couple. The actor explained Lucas and Emilia are about to go public with their relationship, which is a big step forward for them both. Lucas learns Emilia moonlights as a nude model in her spare time and he struggles with her free-spirited attitude. Lucas tries to tell Emilia he is fine with it, but when she presses him, he eventually reveals he is uncomfortable. Of Emilia's reaction, Carena Crawford of All About Soap said "Emilia's understanding, but she starts to doubt whether the pair have enough connection to keep their relationship going."

Emilia later tells Lucas she needs some space, which prompts Lucas to come up with a way to show her how laid back he is. Lucas invites Emilia to the garage and he then gets naked, showing her how open-minded he can be. Crawford said Emilia cannot help but smile at the effort he has gone to and she gives him another chance. Lucas is hurt when he and Emilia break up. He is unaware that Emilia has feelings for Michael and when asked if Lucas would set out for revenge after being dumped for his best friend, Major told a writer for TV Week "If Lucas finds out, the people involved had better look out, as a heartbroken Lucas would be capable of just about anything!" Lucas hopes to reconcile with Emilia when he notices her acting strangely towards him, but he is shocked and devastated when he discovers she is in a relationship with Michael. Lucas "feels like a complete fool" when Michael confirms the news.

==== Vanessa Villante ====
Following his break up with Emilia, Lucas meets Vanessa Villante (Alin Sumarwata), who makes an instant impression on him. Vanessa goes back to Lucas' house and they have a one-night stand. The following morning Vanessa is still there and she cooks breakfast for both Lucas and Lou Carpenter (Tom Oliver). Major told a writer for Inside Soap that both Lucas and Vanessa agree that they do not want a relationship and Lucas expects that he will never see her again. However, a few weeks later Lucas finds Vanessa waiting for him in his kitchen, just as he brings home Nadia Wiseman (Amy Costa) from Charlie's. Major explained "It's all very awkward, of course, and the woman he's just picked up decides to go." Lucas is annoyed by the interruption, but Vanessa then reveals that she is pregnant, which turns his world upside down. Susan Hill of the Daily Star quipped "The carefree lad can't believe their steamy one-night stand led to this."

Vanessa tells Lucas that she does not want to pressure him into anything, but Major commented that Lucas is worried she is after the money he inherited the previous year. However, after he confronts her about it, Vanessa leaves, saying he will not see her again. Major said "Vanessa feels that she did the right thing by coming to tell Lucas, and got slapped in the face for her trouble. She reckons that if Lucas doesn't want anything to do with her or the baby, it's fine. She doesn't need him." Lucas later questions Vanessa about how she can be certain the baby is his and Sumarwata stated that it was not the response Vanessa imagined. Lucas does not accept his new responsibilities towards Vanessa and the baby and Hill said he just wants her to disappear. Vanessa finds employment as head chef at Lassiter's Hotel, infuriating Lucas. He then tells her employer, Paul Robinson (Stefan Dennis), that she is pregnant and she loses the job.

Lucas' feelings for Vanessa start to intensify and he realises that he has fallen in love with her. Lucas struggles to bring himself to tell Vanessa about his feelings, but he does reveal that he plans to buy the house they have been renting. Major told TV Weeks' Jackie Brygel "Lucas realises he has to man up and make some bold decisions. He wants to provide for his family, even though they aren't a conventional family." Lucas does reveal his feeling for Vanessa at his gamblers' support group and he then becomes determined to do whatever it takes to keep Vanessa "front and centre in his life." Major explained that his confession to the group makes his decision to buy the house feel like the right choice. However, Lucas is unaware that Vanessa has fallen in love with Rhys Lawson (Ben Barber).

=== Illegal street racing ===
"I'd like him to do up an old car - one that he does up from the start. And I would also like him to fall in love and be really happy, and then of course for it to all fall apart."

— Major on his dream storylines for Lucas

When Lucas becomes strapped for money and needs something to fill the void left by his gambling addiction, his friend, Billy (Jez Constable), introduces him to Garland Cole (Jack Finsterer), who gets Lucas involved in rebirthing cars and illegal street racing. Major told Digital Spy that the street racing storyline gave him the chance to explore the darker side of Lucas. He explained "As an actor, it would be quite boring to play the good guy all the time and I love playing Lucas when he's being the bad boy. The storyline itself has allowed us to go to new locations – something different – and the good thing about the storyline initially for me was that it was initially Lucas on his own." After Steph goes to jail, Lucas, who had considered settling down, rebels against suburban life. His motivation for street racing is the rush he gets from it, not money. Garland asks Lucas to throw a race and Major said that Lucas is "very proud" and he races to win, so he refuses to throw the race and has to face the consequences. Major added "Lucas is in a very steep downward spiral and unless something pulls him up soon, it could all end in tears." Lucas tries to do the right thing and he also tries to look out for Kate (Ashleigh Brewer) and Sophie Ramsay (Kaiya Jones), who have become his family. Major said that Lucas will "always live life on the edge", but he would like to see his character helping out children who have gone off the rails in the future.

=== Testicular cancer ===
On 26 March 2013, it was announced that Lucas would be diagnosed with cancer. Shortly after learning that his son, Patrick, has been given the all-clear, Karl informs Lucas that he may be seriously ill. Major told TV Week's Thomas Mitchell, "Patrick has had some heart problems and he has an operation to finally fix his valve. Lucas donates blood for the transfusion – and, after that, Karl comes to him with some bad news. He's found Lucas's white blood cell count is quite high, which could be an indicator of an immune deficiency problem and may even be cancer." The news "knocks him for six" and Lucas tries to keep it a secret until he knows for sure, which puts a strain on his relationship with Vanessa. Major explained that Lucas does not want to tell Vanessa about the possibility of cancer because they have been through so much with Patrick and his illness. Major believed that Lucas does not want to reveal his news to Vanessa because he does not want to admit to himself how serious his condition could be.

Karl advises Lucas to undergo more tests immediately, while Lucas hopes for the best. Major hoped the episodes featuring Lucas's cancer diagnosis would help raise awareness of "early detection and future research." The actor revealed that he had lost his father to mantle cell lymphoma, while one of his friends was fighting leukaemia. Major said "I think it is very important to raise awareness of all kinds of cancer so to use a platform like Neighbours, which has millions of viewers, worldwide is a fantastic opportunity. I was very happy to accept the story. Sadly, everyone in their lifetime will be touched by cancer in someway." Major also worked with the Cancer Council of Victoria with their awareness and fundraising campaigns.

=== Departure ===
On 1 July 2013, it was announced that Major had left Neighbours. The actor finished filming with the show the previous week and the cast and crew attended a farewell party for him on 28 June. Major explained that the producers had told him that Lucas had run his course, but they did not want him to leave and offered him the opportunity to direct some episodes of the show. The actor commented "When I first found out it was a bit like a girlfriend breaking up with you when you're not ready to break-up. 'I'm still into this relationship, how can you not want me?!'" Lucas remained on-screen for a few months after Major's departure and details of his exit were initially kept secret. A show spokesperson stated "There's a big few months ahead for Lucas. After so many ups and downs with Vanessa, it'll be interesting to see whether the couple get a happy ending or if there's more heartbreak in store." Major later said while actors did not often get a choice with their final storyline, he was happy with how the writers had stayed true to his character. He was also pleased that he was given "a massive challenge" as an actor and added that Lucas would go down "a very dark road" before he leaves.

Lucas and Vanessa departed on 24 September 2013. After Lucas suffers a gambling relapse, he and Vanessa hold a commitment ceremony at Charlie's and take a honeymoon in the country. Upon returning to Erinsborough, the couple move into their new apartment at Lassiter's, but find it to be a disappointment. However, they soon receive an offer on the apartment, while Lucas receives an offer for the garage. The couple then hear that a house they liked in the country is for sale and they consider moving. Major explained, "They're looking at the house online, saying, 'This is crazy, we can't do this...'. But so many things fall into place it's like the universe is telling them something." Lucas and Vanessa eventually decide to move to the country and say goodbye to their friends. Major was glad that the couple got a happy ending, which he said they deserved.

=== Returns ===
From 2015 to 2022, Major made a total of ten returns to the serial. On 28 November 2014, it was announced that Major had reprised his role for Neighbours' 30th anniversary celebrations. Major returned with Sumarwata, who expressed her happiness that Lucas and Vanessa had "a happy ending" after so much heartache. Lucas returned again from 22 September 2015, after he became the new owner of Fitzgerald Motors. He made another guest appearance on 16 March 2016, and another on 7 October, when he brought his nephew to see Steph. Lucas returned on 8 February 2019, as he visits the garage and listens to a sales pitch from Melissa Lohan (Jacqui Purvis), who wishes to buy it. He returned again on 11 March 2019 for Sonya's funeral. Major reprised the role in 2021, as Lucas fires employee Bea Nilsson (Bonnie Anderson) from the garage. On 9 May 2022, Susannah Alexander of Digital Spy confirmed Major would reprise the role for a brief appearance during the show's final episode. In November 2025, it was reported that Major would briefly return as Lucas the following month for the soap's final episode of its revival series.

== Storylines ==
=== 2008–2013 ===
While he is in Charlie's bar, Lucas flirts with Libby Kennedy. When he fails to secure a date with her, his friends remove his clothes and tie him to a lamp post. Libby unties him and agrees to go on a date with him. Lucas and Libby go out a few times, before she discovers he is Dan's brother. Dan and Lucas fight and Lucas almost falls from a balcony and Dan's shoulder is dislocated. The brothers agree to set aside their differences. Lucas begins a relationship with Elle Robinson and finds employment at the local garage.

Lucas starts gambling again and gets into debt with Johnno Brewer (Damien Aylward). Lucas is forced to ask Dan for help. When Johnno causes a car crash, which claims the life of Bridget Parker (Eloise Mignon), Lucas blames himself and starts to self-destruct. Lucas's Gamblers Anonymous sponsor Sonya Mitchell (Eve Morey) helps him with his problems. Lucas proposes to Elle and she accepts, despite opposition from Dan and Elle's father Paul (Stefan Dennis). Elle gets a job overseas and Lucas encourages her to go. Dan also leaves town after his marriage to Libby ends. Lucas is involved in a motorbike crash and he suffers spinal injuries, which need rehabilitation. Lucas' co-worker, Stephanie Scully, invites him to stay with her and Lucas declares his love for her. Steph suddenly leaves town and on her return, she tells Lucas she has got back together with Toadfish Rebecchi. Lucas damages Toadie's car and he unsuccessfully sets out to try and win Steph back. Lucas befriends Michael Williams and he gets a job at Erinsborough High.

After it emerges Steph is pregnant with Dan's child, Lucas and Libby have a one-night stand. Lucas later tells Steph he still loves her. During Steph's trial for culpable driving, Lucas asks her to run away with him, but she turns him down and is sent to prison. Lucas takes part in illegal street racing organised by Garland Cole (Jack Finsterer). Garland orders Lucas to throw a race and lose, but Lucas does not listen and Garland has him beaten up and Number 24 trashed. Detective Mark Brennan (Scott McGregor) goes undercover at the races and asks Lucas to help him get Garland. Garland asks Lucas to rebirth a car and when he comes to pick it up, Mark has him arrested. Lucas supports Sonya after she admits she is Callum Jones' (Morgan Baker) mother and Toadie throws her out. Lucas manages to convince Toadie that Sonya loves him. Lucas's father dies and he questions going to the funeral, as he did not respect his father. Lawyer Peter Noonan (James Saunders) tells Lucas that his father left him some money and his ashes, which Lucas scatters over a football field.

Lucas briefly dates Michelle Tran (HaiHa Le) and he buys the garage. He also gives Chris Pappas (James Mason) an apprenticeship. When Lucas fails to stand up for Chris against a homophobic customer, Chris quits. Lucas apologises and Chris returns. The Hamilton Group offer Lucas a large sum of money for his garage, so they can build a car park on it for their new shopping complex. Lucas declines the offer. He dates Emilia Jovanovic, Michael's sister-in-law. The garage is sabotaged, causing it to fail a safety inspection. He blames Toadie and his law firm, who are representing The Hamilton Group. When Chris is attacked at the garage, Lucas discovers the culprit was hired by Peter Noonan. Lucas learns Emilia is a nude model and his reaction causes her to slow their relationship down. He apologises and tells Emilia he loves her. Emilia breaks up with Lucas and he sees her kissing Michael. Lucas has a one-night stand with Vanessa Villante, who returns a month later to tell Lucas that she is pregnant. He insults her by asking if he is the father.

Lucas accidentally reveals Vanessa's pregnancy to Paul, costing her a job at Lassiter's. She confronts him about it in front of Kate, who later asks Vanessa to move in. When he realises Rhys Lawson is interested in Vanessa, Lucas warns him to stay away from her. However, Rhys and Vanessa begin dating. Lucas wants to become more involved with the baby and attends Vanessa's first scan. He also opens up to her about his gambling addiction. Number 24 goes up for auction and Lucas decides to purchase it for himself and Vanessa. However, he is outbid by Ajay Kapoor (Sachin Joab) and he buys Number 32 instead. Both Sonya and Lou Carpenter (Tom Oliver) encourage Lucas to tell Vanessa that he loves her. Vanessa's mother, Francesca (Carmelina di Guglielmo), insists that Lucas and Vanessa get married. During the wedding, Vanessa struggles with her vows and leaves the church. Francesca disowns Vanessa. Lucas later speaks with Francesca, as Vanessa wants her around for the baby. This causes Lucas to miss the birth of his son, Patrick (Lucas MacFarlane).

Vanessa gets engaged to Rhys, but ends it when Patrick is diagnosed with Ebstein's anomaly. After learning Lucas loves her, she kisses him and they begin a relationship. While they stay in hospital accommodation, Lucas rents Number 32 to the Turners. When Lucas admits that he is afraid to love Patrick in case he dies, Vanessa gets him to hold their son for the first time. After a second surgery, Patrick is well enough to leave the hospital. After Karl Kennedy (Alan Fletcher) notices Lucas has a high white blood cell count, he conducts further tests and Lucas is diagnosed with testicular cancer. Steph is released from jail and she and Lucas talk. Lucas's cancer surgery is successful and he gets engaged to Vanessa. Steph begins spending more time with Lucas and manipulates his relationship with Vanessa. Lucas calls off the wedding when he learns Vanessa was once married. Steph then tries to persuade him to go away with her. Lucas reconciles with Vanessa and Steph kidnaps Patrick. Lucas and Matt Turner (Josef Brown) find her and return Patrick unharmed.

Lucas purchases a Lassiter's apartment, putting a strain on his finances. He and Vanessa are forced to put Number 32 up for sale. Vanessa becomes pregnant again. Lucas starts gambling and gets into debt with Robbo Slade (Aaron Jakubenko). When Robbo dies after a hit and run, Lucas is questioned by the police. He explains that a stranger informed him Robbo was using marked cards, so he confronted him. The stranger intervened and returned Lucas's money to him. Vanessa's first husband Alek Pocoli (Damian De Montemas) gives her $100,000 for quick annulment. The money eases Lucas and Vanessa's financial problems and they decide not to sell Number 32. Lucas and Vanessa hold a commitment ceremony. After receiving offers for the apartment and the garage, Lucas and Vanessa sell up and move to Daylesford, where Vanessa gives birth to their daughter Sebastiana. Kathy Carpenter (Tina Bursill) later buys Number 32 from Lucas.

=== 2015–2022 ===
Vanessa and Lucas return for the Erinsborough Festival and they bring Sebastiana (Izabella Anderson) with them. They catch up with Toadie and Chris, who tells them he is going to be a father, before returning home. A few months later, Lucas returns to Erinsborough having bought back Fitzgerald Motors. Tyler Brennan (Travis Burns) initially mistakes him for a thief and tackles him to the ground. After being introduced by Mark, Lucas agrees to keep Tyler on as manager. Sonya suspects that Lucas is gambling again, but when she questions him, Lucas gets defensive. Vanessa later reveals that she sold a cupcake recipe to a bakery, but they had to keep it a secret as they signed a non-disclosure agreement. Sonya apologises to Lucas and they make up. A couple of weeks later, Lucas returns to confront Steph, having learned that Tyler has hired her for the garage. Toadie tells Lucas that they should give her a chance, and Lucas agrees to give her a three-month trial. He asks that she not contact him or Vanessa directly, but to go through Toadie instead.

Philippa Hoyland (Wendy Bos) calls Lucas as a witness during mediation between herself and Steph. Lucas says that Steph is a good mother and should have more access to her son. He and Steph part on good terms. Months later, Lucas brings his nephew Adam Fitzgerald (Archie Campbell) to Erinsborough, so he can spend the afternoon with Steph. Lucas later returns to town to fire Tyler from the garage, after Tyler leaves town for a few days. Months later, Lucas comes back to interview prospective mechanics and Brad Willis (Kip Gamblin) convinces Lucas to hear Tyler out. Tyler tells Lucas that he wants a chance to prove himself again, as he has someone who is relying on him now. Lucas offers Tyler back his job, on the conditions that he hires an apprentice and does not mess up again.

Lucas returns to Erinsborough to meet with Melissa Lohan about selling the garage. He catches up with Sonya and tells her how his family is doing, before noticing that she is getting upset. Sonya tells him that she just misses him and pulls him in for a hug. Lucas tells mechanic, Bea Nilsson, that he is not planning to sell the garage just yet, and will hire a new manager for a one-month trial instead. However, after the garage is damaged by fire, Lucas agrees to sell it to Mel. Not long after, Sonya dies from ovarian cancer and Lucas returns with Vanessa for her memorial. At the wake, Lucas tells Bea that he is not going to sell the garage after all, and will use the insurance to repair the damage, before hiring another manager. Two years later, Lucas fires Bea after she searches through files found in Sheila Canning's (Shareena Clanton) car, which she was meant to be servicing. The following year, Lucas attends Toadie's wedding to Melanie Pearson (Lucinda Cowden). Two years later, he makes a brief return to finalise the sale of the garage to Shane Ramsay (Peter O'Brien). The year after that he visits Erinsborough again when Ramsay Street is threatened with demolition and views the proposed site of Shane's new property development, Ramsay Hills.

== Reception ==
"Every couple of episodes, we turn on and Lucas is up to his neck in hot water. So why do we like him so much? It's because he's Ramsay Street's resident lovable rogue. Every generation of Neighbours viewers gets one, and he's the latest. But having a twinkle in his eye hasn't kept him free of problems."

— A Daily Record reporter on Lucas (2010)

For his portrayal of Lucas, Major was nominated in the Best Bad Boy category at the 2009 All About Soap Awards. In 2013, he received a nomination for Best Daytime Star at the Inside Soap Awards. A writer for Holy Soap stated Lucas' most memorable moment was when he felt responsible for Bridget Parker's death after Johnno Brewer sabotaged the Parkers' car. They said "It led to a guilt-stricken Lucas trying to flee Ramsay Street".

A Daily Record reporter observed that Lucas' relationship with Elle was becoming more epic than "Doctor Zhivago, Romeo and Juliet or The Thorn Birds. They branded it a silly storyline because they were "clearly mad for each other" but "too stubborn to let each other know it." After Lucas discovers Dan has given Sam his savings, a writer for the publication said "Even Lucas, who's hardly a moral compass you could steer by, is disgusted by his brother's actions." Of the character's reaction to receiving a large inheritance, a writer for the paper said "It's hard to find any sympathy with Lucas at the minute - he's suddenly rolling in money, but he'd rather not have it. Get a grip man!" In July 2011, Anthony D. Langford from AfterElton revealed that he had seen some comments from people thinking that Lucas and Chris should be paired up. Langford believed that there was not a hint of romance between the two characters and stated that he liked Chris and Lucas's mentor and mentee relationship as it is.

Cameron Adams of the Herald Sun said Lucas went to "some rather extreme lengths" to win over Emilia when he posed naked with a toolbox for her. A columnist for All About Soap said that Lucas showing Emilia his "birthday suit" was a "bonkers plan". They called him desperate and said he had gone to "extreme lengths". They added that he could not convince them that he is laid-back with a naked display and quipped that Emilia is a "lucky (ahem) lady." Claire Crick from the same publication commented on Lucas' baby drama, saying "Here at All About Soap, we'd love to see him be a dad (and get a hair cut – but that's a whole other matter entirely!) – you never know, he and Vanessa could even make a go of things and be a family!" Crick's colleague Kerry Barrett wrote "Lucas is a loser, right? Only cares about fast cars and faster women? Not any more. Vanessa's changed him." Barrett added that due to Vanessa's presence Lucas had decided to "grow up and concentrate on being a dad!" Dianne Butler, writing for news.com.au, branded Lucas "one of the nicest neighbours but one who should never gamble with anything other than buttons." In 2015, a Herald Sun reporter included Lucas' return in their "Neighbours' 30 most memorable moments" feature.
