= Gemma Pranita =

Australian actress (born 1985)

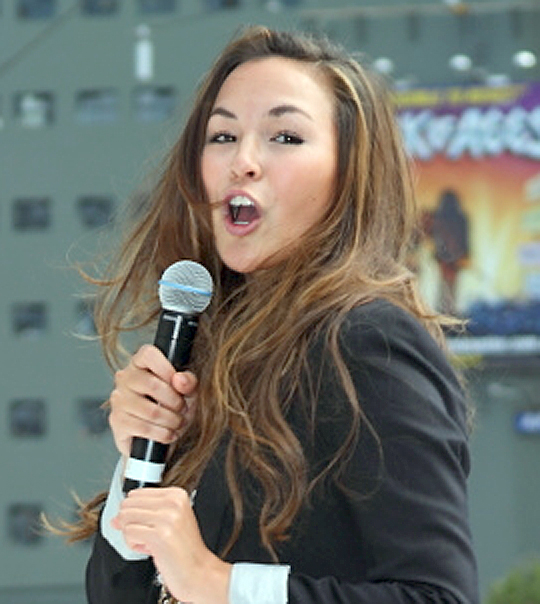
- Pranita at the Cotton on Fashion Parade in Melbourne on 19 March 2011
- Born: Gemma Pranita Xumsai; 18 December 1985 (age 40); Bangkok, Thailand
- Occupations: Actress; Photographer; Podcaster
- Years active: 1999–present
- Spouse: Matthew Rooney (m. 2015)
- Children: 2

Gemma Pranita (born 18 December 1985) is a Thai-born Australian actress. Pranita was encouraged to join the Western Australian Academy of Performing Arts (WAAPA) by her drama teacher, and from 1999 to 2003, she competed at state level in the Shakespeare Globe Association's annual Shakespeare festival. Pranita formed a theatre company called Cry Havoc! with her best friend in 2006. After graduating from WAAPA, Pranita joined the Bell Shakespeare theatre company. She has also had roles in the films, Crush and Resistance. From 2010 until 2012, Pranita played Jade Mitchell in the Australian soap opera Neighbours. She briefly reprised the role in March 2019. After leaving Neighbours, Pranita appeared in The Ever After and launched a blog showcasing her career as a photographer. She also co-hosts the We Don't Have Time For This podcast.

== Early life ==
Pranita was born Gemma Pranita Xumsai in 1985 in Bangkok, Thailand, the daughter of a Thai father and an English mother. When she was twelve years old, Pranita and her family moved to Australia. Pranita took an interest in drama, art and music at her Sydney high school and she became friends with Kate Reeves. Pranita's drama teacher encouraged her to apply to the Western Australian Academy of Performing Arts (WAAPA). Pranita plays the guitar, composes music and she regularly performs in public.

== Career ==
=== Acting ===
From 1999 to 2003, Pranita competed at state level in the Shakespeare Globe Association's annual Shakespeare festival. In 2002, she was invited to join the company in their National production of Loves Labors Lost as a performer and score composer. Pranita and Revz formed Cry Havoc!, a theatre company, together in 2006. After she graduated from WAAPA in 2007, Pranita joined the Bell Shakespeare theatre company and she toured with them for eight months. She also played the lead role in Revz's short film, Hi My Name is Billy. The following year, Pranita joined the cast of thriller film, Crush. The film shot on location in Perth and Pranita played the role of the Nurse. Pranita plays the role of the Spanish Valentina Vega in the Australian Sci-fi film, Resistance.

In September 2010, a Herald Sun reporter announced Pranita would be joining the cast of Neighbours as Jade Mitchell, the younger sister of Sonya (played by Eve Morey). Pranita was in Russia researching Anton Chekhov when her agent called her to audition for Neighbours. The actress returned to Australia and her agent informed her that she could audition on the last day. Pranita won the role and she moved to Melbourne for filming within the week. Pranita initially signed a twelve-month contract with the show. On 8 June 2012, Fiona Byrne of the Herald Sun reported Pranita would be departing Neighbours. Pranita stated that two years was long enough to play one character and she wanted to challenge herself to do other things. Pranita filmed her final scenes on 9 August.

Following her departure from Neighbours, Pranita appeared in the short film Banter as Emma. She then appeared alongside fellow Australian actresses Teresa Palmer and Phoebe Tonkin in The Ever After directed by Mark Webber. Prainta reprised her Neighbours role for a brief guest stint in March 2019.

=== Blog, photography and podcast ===
Pranita started a fashion and photography blog called Gemma Peanut Gallery in 2013. Pranita features posts of herself and friends, including some of Australia's starlets, from Margot Robbie to Rachael Taylor, Renee Bargh, Teresa Palmer, Phoebe Tonkin and Delta Goodrem. She launched an online photography course in September 2016.

Pranita co-hosts the We Don't Have Time For This podcast with her close friend Kate Reeves. The podcast covers topics relating to motherhood, fashion, careers, and relationships. In 2023, Pranita and Reeves embarked on a tour with their live show titled "Can We Not Evolve?"

== Personal life ==
Pranita dated Australian actor Jai Courtney for eight years before splitting in 2013.

Pranita is married to Matthew Rooney. The two were childhood friends, who became engaged after 18 months together. In October 2017, Pranita announced that she was expecting the couple's first child. She gave birth to their daughter on 18 April 2018. Pranita gave birth to their second child, a son, in 2020.

== Filmography ==
Year	Title	Role	Notes
2007	Hi My Name is Billy		Short film
2009	Crush	Nurse	
2010	Resistance	Valentina Vega	Pilot episode
2010–12, 2019	Neighbours	Jade Mitchell	243 episodes
2012	Banter	Emma	Short film
2014	Checked Out	Melinda	TV film
2014	The Ever After	Naja	
