= Eve Morey =

Australian actress (born 1983)

- Born: 4 June 1983 (age 43); Melbourne, Victoria, Australia
- Occupation: Actress
- Years active: 1999–present
- Known for: Neighbours (TV series) as Sonya Rebecchi
- Spouse: Jonathon Dutton (m. 2015)
- Children: 2

Eve Morey (born 4 June 1983) is an Australian actress. Her roles have included Lucy Green in Pig's Breakfast (1999) and Sonya Rebecchi in the soap opera Neighbours, the latter role played from 2009 to 2022. She has also appeared in All Saints (1998), Home and Away (1998) and various theatre productions.

== Career ==
Morey majored in drama and media studies, while undertaking a Bachelor of Arts Degree at Deakin University. She also completed a foundation course at the Victorian College of the Arts. Morey played the role of Lucy Green in the Nine Network children's television series, Pig's Breakfast, for two years. In 2000, she was accepted into National Institute of Dramatic Art.

In 2007, Morey played Gina Quinn in an episode of All Saints. She also had a guest role as Paige in Home and Away. Two years later she joined Neighbours in the recurring role of guide dog trainer Sonya Mitchell. In August 2010, it was announced Morey had been promoted to regular cast member. In February 2011, Morey signed a new contract to stay with Neighbours for another year.

Morey played Blonde Girl in the 2009 short comedy film, Blind Date. The following year she played Evie in Hobby Farm. Morey has appeared in a number of theatre productions for the Sydney Theatre Company and the Melbourne Theatre Company.

In January 2019, it was confirmed that Morey would be leaving Neighbours, as her character is killed off. Morey later stated that her contract had not been renewed, and that she had asked for her character to die, as she knew Sonya would not willingly leave her husband and children. Her final episode aired on 5 March 2019. Later that year, Morey received nominations for the Gold Logie Award for Most Popular Personality on Australian Television and the Logie Award for Most Popular Actress. She made an uncredited cameo appearance as Sonya on 1 January 2020.

Following her departure from Neighbours, Morey secured a role in the second season of Mystery Road.

Morey returned to Neighbours for one episode in the show’s finale on 28 July 2022.

== Personal life ==
On 8 September 2014, Morey announced that she and her fiancé Jonathon Dutton were expecting their first child. She gave birth to their daughter on 28 November 2014. Morey and Dutton were married on 31 October 2015. During an appearance on The Wright Stuff in June 2017, Morey announced she was expecting her second child, a girl.

== Filmography ==
=== Film ===
Year	Title	Role	Notes
2010	Hobby Farm	Evie	
2010	The Mighty Hand of God	Carli	Short film
2023	Shayda	Lara	Feature film

=== Television ===
Year	Title	Role	Notes
1999	Pig's Breakfast	Lucy Green	
2007	All Saints	Gina Quinn	Episode: "If Only ..."
2007	Home and Away	Paige	Episode: "4388"
2009	Blind Date	Blonde Girl	Short film
2009	Sally Bollywood	Doowee McAdam	Episode: "Mr Big"
2009–20, 2022	Neighbours	Sonya Rebecchi	Series regular; 1042 episodes
2012	Big Brother's Bit On The Side	Herself	Episode: "3 July 2012"
2020	Mystery Road	Kayla	Season 2, episodes 1 & 6
2021	Total Control	Cassie	2 episodes
2022	More Than This	Caroline	2 episodes
