= Episode 6188 (Neighbours) =

- Neighbours episode
- Episode no.: Episode 6188
- Directed by: Jonathon Dutton
- Written by: Sarah Mayberry
- Original air date: 22 June 2011

Guest appearance
- Paul Ireland as Duncan Hayes

Episode chronology
← Previous; Episode 6187	Next → Episode 6189

"Episode 6188" is the 6188th episode of the Australian soap opera Neighbours. It premiered on Eleven on 22 June 2011. The episode was written by Sarah Mayberry, directed by Jonathon Dutton, and executively produced by Susan Bower. Episode 6188 revolves around Mark Brennan's (Scott McGregor) departure from the soap. The storyline sees Mark tell his girlfriend, Kate Ramsay (Ashleigh Brewer), that he is going into witness protection. He reveals that she has just 30 minutes to decide whether to stay behind in Erinsborough or leave with him. However, when she makes the choice to leave, she has trouble convincing her younger sister to come too.

The soap's executive producer, Susan Bower, revealed that the team wanted Mark "to go out with a bang" and they took inspiration from the US drama 24 to create a special real-time episode. The show's script producer thought the technique was "the best way to do justice" to the character and his exit, although it proved to be a challenge for the crew as it was different from the normal storytelling process. Episode 6188 focused on a 30-minute timeframe between 6:30 pm and 7:00 pm, which is when Neighbours is broadcast in Australia. The episode was filmed over two nights and extra effort went into ensuring the continuity was right throughout.

The episode received generally positive attention. A TV Week writer stated that it was "unmissable". The Sydney Morning Herald's Andrew Murfett believed the real-time aspect was "a clever device" for fans of the show who may have fallen out of touch with it. Cameron Adams from the Herald Sun chose the episode for his feature on the best television programs being broadcast on 22 June. Channel 5 included the episode in their "Top 20 Aussie Soap Moments of 2011" program, while Inside Soap proclaimed the episode was one of "The Best Bits of July" in their annual yearbook. Dutton earned a nomination for Best Direction in a TV Drama at the 2012 Australian Directors' Guild Awards.

== Plot ==
Mark Brennan (Scott McGregor) waits nervously for an answer from his girlfriend, Kate Ramsay (Ashleigh Brewer), about going into witness protection with him. He states that it is too dangerous for him to stay in Erinsborough and that she can bring her younger sister, Sophie (Kaiya Jones), with them. Kate tells Mark that she does not want to lose him and agrees to go. Mark reveals that they only have half an hour and heads over to his house to pack. Sophie returns home and Kate tells her that they are leaving town that night. An upset Sophie explains that she cannot pack her life up in a bag and refuses to go. Kate tells her the decision has already been made and they are leaving. As Mark is wondering whether to call his parents, his housemate, Jade Mitchell (Gemma Pranita), arrives home unexpectedly. When she enquires about his bag, he tells her he needs a change of clothes for a double shift. Kate finds Mark and asks for more time, but Mark tells her they do not have any. He gives her the details of the meeting point and they kiss, before Kate leaves him.

Mark's other housemate, Kyle Canning (Chris Milligan), gets in from work and realises Mark is leaving because of the harassment he has received due to exposing the corruption within the police force. Mark admits he is going into witness protection and he and Kyle say their goodbyes. Sophie decides to go with Kate and they hurry to meet Mark. At the meeting point, Mark's boss, Duncan Hayes (Paul Ireland), arrives and asks if Mark is ready. He replies that Kate is on her way, as he hands his wallet and phone over. Sophie struggles to keep up with her sister and tells her to go to Mark, as they can collect her on the way. Kate continues running, just as it starts to rain. Hayes tells Mark that they need to leave, but Mark asks him to wait for a few more minutes. When Kate reaches the meeting point, she finds no one there. Sophie questions whether Mark changed his mind and Kate runs home to Ramsay Street. She enters Mark's house calling his name and then receives a text message saying "I love you", which Mark sent from Hayes' phone. Kyle comforts Kate while she cries about Mark.

== Production ==
=== Conception and development ===
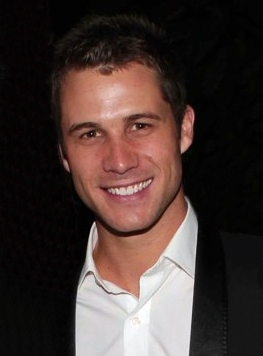
Scott McGregor called the episode "really intense and dark" and believed viewers would be on the edge of their seats waiting to find out what happens.

In February 2011, McGregor announced his departure from Neighbours and a Herald Sun reporter stated that he would film his final scenes in April. On screen, his character was seen exposing corruption within the local police force and then receiving threats from some of his colleagues. McGregor later explained to a Press Association reporter that Mark's exit storyline would not be a happy one, as he is forced out of Ramsay Street. Mark is asked to enter a witness protection program and the night before he leaves, he realises he is still in love with his ex-girlfriend, Kate (Brewer). McGregor told Sarah Ellis of Inside Soap "He hasn't been able to tell Kate that he's leaving before now – but he just can't say goodbye, and asks her to come along with him. It's such a very big ask, so of course she has to give it a lot of thought."

Mark's departure was shown during a special real-time episode, which focused on a 30-minute timeframe. Executive producer Susan Bower revealed that the team wanted Mark "to go out with a bang" and commented that while the episode features about half a dozen people, it is mostly about Mark and Kate. The show's script producer, Emma Gordon, agreed that the real-time episode was "the best way to do justice" to the character and his exit. McGregor explained that while the producers were planning his character's exit, they took inspiration from the US drama 24. Gordon admitted to Tiffany Fox from The West Australian that the technique was a real challenge for Neighbours. She said "It is a bit different and a bit out of our normal storytelling process but it gives such a sense of tension which is exactly the feeling we wanted to create. When you have half an hour to make a decision that will affect the rest of your life, every excruciating minute counts."

=== Filming ===
The episode sees Mark reveal that he only has 30 minutes before he has to leave for witness protection. He then tries to convince Kate to come with him. The storyline takes place between 6:30pm and 7:00pm, which is when Neighbours airs in Australia. The episode was filmed over two nights and Gordon told Fox that extra effort went into ensuring the continuity was "perfect." Every minute had to be accounted for, including the commercial breaks and the time taken up by the actors walking from one house to another. Gordon commented that clocks and watches are used throughout the episode to keep the tension high. During an interview with a Channel 5 website reporter, Brewer said that filming the episode was similar to filming a regular episode of the soap, as the scenes were still shot out of order. She thought it was nice working in a short time period that did not jump from day to day. During the filming of the final scenes on location, the weather took a turn for the worse and it began to rain. However, Gordon added that it looked "spectacular and adds such an atmosphere."

Brewer told a Channel 5 website writer that the rain was the biggest challenge of the night shoot, as it was "beyond freezing". She also revealed that she ran in shoes that she had not broken in and they made her feet bleed. The actress added "It was incredibly stressful but I guess it was stress in a good way. There were months of preparation involved so that it could run like clockwork. So I guess it was stressful in the sense the emotional stakes were heightened for a two-week period. It was exhausting and I think we can all say we were happy once it was over. But the final result was worth it." McGregor filmed his final scene out of sequence at the Melbourne studios. He explained that they had already shot Mark's last scene on location, then went back inside to do the studio shots. He revealed "The final thing I filmed was a conversation between Mark and Kyle, where they're saying goodbye. It was a bit sad, but it was basically just these two guys hugging each other – with the cast and crew watching!"

== Reception ==
The real-time episode was broadcast on 22 June 2011 in Australia and on 20 July in the UK. It was watched by 408,000 Australian viewers upon its first airing, making Neighbours the highest rated show on digital multi-channels that night. In the UK, an audience of 1.30 million watched the episode. For his work on Episode 6188, Dutton earned a nomination for Best Direction in a TV Drama at the 2012 Australian Directors' Guild Awards. A TV Week website writer called the episode "an edge-of-your-seat special", which was "unmissable". The Sydney Morning Herald's readers gave the episode three out of five stars, while the paper's television critic, Andrew Murfett, commented "The clock is omnipresent in tonight's 'real-time' Neighbours episode. The gimmick of the formatting – the episode unfolds in real time over an action-packed 30 minutes on Ramsay Street – means the clock appears almost every minute to remind us of what is a pressing deadline. It's a clever device for fans who have perhaps fallen out of touch with the folks at Erinsborough. In fact it's almost impossible not be at least mildly interested about the future prospects of Scott McGregor and Ashleigh Brewer in the aftermath of this 24-style ep."

A reporter for PopSugar Australia said "We love it when our favourite, long-running TV soapies surprise us with something new and a little different." Cameron Adams from the Herald Sun included the episode in his feature on the best television programs being broadcast on 22 June, saying "Brooding cop Mark Brennan (Scott McGregor) has 30 minutes to leave Erinsborough before the poop goes down with the dodgy police investigation that's been dragging on for months. Girlfriend Kate plans to leave with him, but her sister Sophie's not so keen on a life change." Channel 5 included the episode in their "Top 20 Aussie Soap Moments of 2011" program, where it came second overall. A writer for the channel's website believed that it was clear from the start that Mark would be worthy of a memorable send-off, during a feature on the character's "best bits". A writer for the Inside Soap Yearbook, which was published at the end of 2011, proclaimed the episode was one of "The Best Bits of July". A reporter for the Daily Record stated "Goodbye Brennan – we enjoyed having you and your hunky good looks around, but all good things must come to an end."
