= Zeke Kinski =

Fictional character from the Australian soap opera Neighbours

- Neighbours character
- Portrayed by: Matthew Werkmeister
- Duration: 2005–2011, 2014
- First appearance: 22 August 2005
- Last appearance: 16 April 2014
- Introduced by: Ric Pellizzeri (2005); Richard Jasek (2014)
In-universe information
- Other names: Trent
- Occupation: School student; University student; DJ
- Father: Alex Kinski
- Mother: Francesca Kinski
- Stepfather: Karl Kennedy
- Stepmother: Susan Kennedy
- Brothers: Malcolm Kennedy (step); Billy Kennedy (step)
- Sisters: Katya Kinski; Rachel Kinski; Libby Kennedy (step); Holly Hoyland (step)
- Wife: Victoria Elmahdi (2014–)
- Nephews: Ben Kirk (step)

Zeke Kinski is a fictional character from the Australian soap opera Neighbours, played by Matthew Werkmeister. He made his first on-screen appearance on 22 August 2005. Zeke is the son of Alex Kinski and the younger brother of Katya and Rachel. His storylines have included the death of his father, being trapped in the warehouse collapse, developing an anxiety disorder, joining Pirate Net and forming many romantic relationships. In October 2010, it was announced that Werkmeister and his character were to leave Neighbours. Zeke made his final appearance on 11 March 2011. In February 2014, it was announced that Werkmeister would be returning to Neighbours for a brief guest stint and Zeke returned on 7 April 2014.

== Casting ==
In August 2005, it was announced that a new family would be introduced to the show. The three-strong family consisted of widower Alex Kinski (Andrew Clarke) and his two teenage children; Rachel (Caitlin Stasey) and Zeke. Actor Matthew Werkmeister was cast as Zeke. The actor was on holiday when he was invited to attend the audition. However, he almost missed out on the role when his father took the call about the audition and refused to drive the five hours it took to get there. Werkmeister said that he was "horrified" when he found out and called his agent back to find out if he could still attend the audition, which he was. Werkmeister received a call back and he performed a scene with Stasey. Four days later, he was told he had won the part and he commented that he was "absolutely ecstatic".

== Development ==
=== Characterisation ===
In his fictional backstory, Zeke is the intelligent son of Francesca and Alex and the younger brother of Katya (Dichen Lachman) and Rachel. Rachel and Zeke were home-schooled by their parents and they led sheltered lives until they enrolled at Erinsborough High. Katya was thrown out of the home following Francesca's death and Zeke had no contact with her. The official Neighbours website credits Zeke with the nickname "Zeke the freak" and describe him as originally being a "kooky outcast" and "supremely bright but socially inept". They also describe him as always seeing life as black and white, usually finding it hard to adjust to new situations. One of Zeke's earliest storylines was dealing with the death of his father, in the aftermath Zeke was seen refusing to talk, using it as a coping mechanism. Of the plot Werkmeister stated: "I'm glad that story is over, it was annoying trying to find those damn cards with words! Although it was nice doing something different for a while."

Zeke was initially portrayed as being anti-social and clever, leading fans to believe he could have the characteristics of Asperger's Syndrome, of this Werkmeister explained: "It wasn't really written at first, so me and the writers made up his quirks." As his character progressed the writing changed as Zeke grew older, of this Werkmeister stated: "I think Zeke is now starting to grow out of it as he meets new people and picks up how to be more social, but he will always be very knowledgeable." Zeke's storylines began to take a more adult theme at the end of 2007, writers introduced a series of changes to his character, of this Werkmeister commented: “Zeke is about to make the transition from little boy to grown-up teenager, which will be good for me because I can broaden his character traits, he becomes more socially aware and gets a new girlfriend.” Werkmeister has spoken of his love of watching Zeke grow up over the years on-screen.

=== Departure ===
In 2009, media reports circulated that Werkmeister was planning on quitting the program. However, it was confirmed shortly after that he was committed to the role, as a spokesperson for Neighbours commented, "Matt Werkmeister is on a contract with Neighbours which will take him well into next year."

In October 2010, it was announced that Werkmeister had quit Neighbours along with two other members of the cast. Werkmeister said "When I started on Neighbours I was only thirteen, I didn't shave or drive a car so I really have grown up on the show. I've learnt so much, worked with some great people who are now some of my closest friends." Werkmeister filmed his final scenes on 3 December 2010. He admitted to being glad that he would not have to wear his character's signature vests again, commenting "No vest envy here, I will never wear another one again!"

=== Return ===
On 10 February 2014, it was announced that Werkmeister would be returning to Neighbours for a brief guest stint. The actor has already filmed his scenes for "a special celebration episode". Werkmeister's on-screen step mother and father, Jackie Woodburne and Alan Fletcher said it was good to have him back for their 20th year with Neighbours and Woodburne commented, "It seems like yesterday that Matt walked on set as a young boy still at primary school, and suddenly now he's a grown man! We have shared a lot of fun storylines as well as a few tragic ones, the full gamut." Werkmeister later said that Zeke would return with a secret, which will surprise everyone. He also explained that during his time away, Zeke has travelled the world and has been studying. Werkmeister added that Zeke still wears vests and flamboyant shirts. Werkmeister's return scenes as Zeke aired from 7 April 2014.

== Storylines ==
Alex begins a relationship with Susan Kennedy (Jackie Woodburne) and the family moved in with her. When Zeke discovers that Rachel has made friends with Bree Timmins (Sianoa Smit-McPhee), he lets himself be introduced to TV, junk food and other items of popular culture. Alex marries Susan after discovering that he had terminal leukaemia and dies hours after the wedding. Katya arrives and tries to fight Susan for custody of her siblings and takes them to live with her. However, they later move back in with Susan. Zeke begins dating Bree, but they decide that they are not meant to be together. Zeke then dates Lolly Allen (Adelaide Kane) and is upset when she moves back home to be with her father and siblings. Zeke is held hostage along with Katya, Toadfish Rebecchi (Ryan Moloney), Stephanie Scully (Carla Bonner) and Charlie Hoyland (Jacob Britio) by Guy Sykes (Fletcher Humphrys). Zeke distracts Guy by hitting him with a book and Toadie wrestles Guy to the ground as everybody escapes. He is then shot by Guy. Katya soon leaves for a nursing job and Susan remarries her former husband Karl Kennedy (Alan Fletcher). Karl's father, Tom (Bob Hornery), moves in and Zeke bonds with him when Tom mistakes him for Karl due to his dementia. Zeke is upset when Tom goes to live in a care home.

Zeke begins a relationship with Taylah Jordan (Danielle Horvat). Zeke attends an illegal dance party at an old warehouse with Taylah and their friends The warehouse collapses and traps Zeke. Karl gets into the warehouse and helps his daughter Libby (Kym Valentine) first, which upsets Zeke as he believes no one would choose him first in an emergency because he has very little biological family left. Karl explains that he helped Libby first because he assessed that Zeke was not badly hurt. Taylah's father bans Zeke from seeing his daughter and later catches Zeke asleep in Taylah's room. Taylah is then sent away. Zeke begins hanging out with a new gang of friends, including Justin Hunter (Chris Toohey) and Kyle Canning (Chris Milligan). During a school rafting trip, Zeke, along with Bridget Parker (Eloise Mignon) and Libby go missing when their raft capsizes. Zeke's life jacket and his damaged helmet are found, but Zeke remains missing. His family hold a memorial for him at the General Store.

It later emerges that Phil Andrews (Robert Mammone) found Zeke and took him to live with him, believing he was his deceased son. After finding Zeke, Susan tries to convince him to come home, but Zeke says he does not know who she is. Zeke is taken to the hospital and is diagnosed as suffering from a Dissociative Fugue, leaving him with no memories from before the rafting accident. Zeke's memories slowly start to come back when he recognises Rachel. Zeke later has an anxiety disorder caused by the rafting accident and his subsequent abduction. Harry Ramsay (Will Moore) notices Zeke behaving oddly and raises it to Karl through the column he has in a newspaper. Karl takes Zeke on a rafting trip to help him face his fears. Zeke becomes a DJ called Lost Boy at the local radio station Pirate Net. When exchange student Sunny Lee (Hany Lee) arrives in Ramsay Street, she is embarrassed by Lost Boy and tries to find out who he really is. Desperate not to be found out, Zeke uses Kyle as a cover. Zeke talks to Donna on his last show and then reveals his real identity. Sunny develops a crush on Zeke and when they are locked in a closet during camp, they almost kiss. Sunny and Zeke decide to take their relationship slowly. They attend a music festival together. When Sunny falls down a ravine, Zeke tries to help, but he too falls down the ravine and has an anxiety attack. They are rescued by Declan Napier (James Sorensen) and Lucas Fitzgerald (Scott Major).

Zeke becomes aware that Robin Hester (Benjamin Jay) has a crush on Sunny and tries to keep him away from her. Zeke attacks Robin in front of Susan, who believes that his anxiety disorder is back. Robin locks Zeke in a storeroom at PirateNet, so he can spend time with Sunny alone. He lets Zeke out when Sunny tries to find him and Zeke attacks him, scaring Sunny. Zeke apologises and tells Sunny that Robin was trying to take her away from him. She realises that Zeke was right about Robin all along and gets Robin to confess. Zeke then tells Robin to stay away from them both. Sunny returns home to her parents. During schoolies week, Zeke meets Mia Zannis (Alicia Bonnadio) and learns that she is involved in an animal activist group. Zeke goes along with the group to a testing facility in the area and Zeke is caught by security and charged with trespassing. During his court appearance, he argues with the judge and is placed in jail for contempt of court. He is given a six-month good behaviour bond.

Paul Robinson (Stefan Dennis) purchases PirateNet and turns it into a commercial radio station. Zeke is unhappy at having to promote products on air. Zeke meets Mia again when he does community service. Mia tries to set him up as the ring leader of the animal activist group, but Zeke finds out about her plan and plants the evidence on her. When Paul sells PirateNet to the school, Zeke helps teach the students how to use the equipment. Zeke feels left out of Donna and Ringo's wedding preparations and Declan allows him to take over the planning of the bucks night. Zeke is devastated when Ringo later dies in an accident and tells Donna that Ringo applied to a New York fashion school on her behalf. He encourages her to go. Zeke tries to flirt with new neighbour Jade Mitchell (Gemma Pranita) and she tells him that Sophie Ramsay (Kaiya Jones) has a crush on him and that he needs to talk to her about it because she is younger than he is. After getting some advice from Declan and Toadie, Zeke tells Sophie that nothing will ever happen between them, upsetting her. Zeke begins co-hosting a radio show with Summer Hoyland (Jordy Lucas). After gaining the opportunity to study at the London School of Economics, Zeke leaves Erinsborough.

Three years later, Zeke returns to Erinsborough to catch up with Susan and Karl, and surprise Kate Ramsay (Ashleigh Brewer) on her birthday. He is devastated when she is shot and dies. When Zeke begins acting strangely, Karl becomes determined to find out what is going on. After seeing Zeke with another guy, Karl suspects Zeke might be gay. Zeke sits Karl and Susan down to tell them that he has met someone, a girl, and they are getting married that same day. Zeke explains that his visa is running out and by getting married, he will be able to stay in England permanently. His fiancée, Victoria (Sophie Emberson-Bain), arrives to meet with Karl and Susan, who give the pair their blessing. Zeke and Victoria then marry and return to London after the ceremony.

== In other media ==
In 2009, Neighbours became the first Australian series to establish Twitter accounts for its characters. Zeke was one of four characters to have an account set up, with the others being Declan, Donna and Ringo. They began sending daily updates to their fans, which are "complementary to the show's on-air storylines". FremantleMedia Enterprises vice-president of licensing Ben Liebmann said, "We thought it was a really great way to continue or allow the audience to engage with the Neighbours world off-screen". The messages are overseen by the Fremantle digital team, which is integrated with the story department of the Neighbours production team.

== Reception ==
For his portrayal of Zeke, Werkmeister was nominated for Best Young Actor at the 2008 Inside Soap Awards. Conrad Walters from The Sydney Morning Herald branded the character "Zeke the Freak". Ruth Deller from entertainment website Lowculture profiled Zeke in one of her monthly columns featuring popular and unpopular soap opera characters. She called him irritating stating, "I have often stuck up for Zeke in the past whilst others have derided him. After all, losing both parents at a young age and having Katya, Rachel and Libby for sisters seem fairly good reasons for him acting like an arse. I don’t even mind the OCD storyline, though I suspect I'm in a minority there. However, even I have to concede that he's been acting like a twat lately, and mooning over Sunny, of all people, is not going to win me back around."
