= List of Neighbours characters introduced in 2009 =

The following is a list of characters that first appeared in the Australian soap opera Neighbours in 2009, by order of first appearance. They were all introduced by the show's executive producer Susan Bower. The 25th season of Neighbours began airing on 19 January 2009. Robert Mammone began appearing as Phil Andrews from early February and Donna Freedman's mother Cassandra Freedman also arrived that month. Former AFL player Clint Bizzell began appearing as Adam Clarke from March and Kaela Hilton joined as Melissa Evans. Sunny Lee, played by Hany Lee, arrived in April and a new generation of the Ramsay family, Kate, Harry and Sophie Ramsay, were introduced in May. June saw the birth of India Napier, the child of the established Declan Napier and Bridget Parker. July saw the introductions of Amanda Fowler and Josh Burns played by comedian, Scott Brennan. Sonya Mitchell, Jumilla Chandra and James Linden all arrived in August. Teenager, Robin Hester began appearing from September as did fashion designer, Saffron Jankievicz. Mia Zannis arrived in November.

== Phil Andrews ==
Phil Andrews
- Neighbours character
- Portrayed by: Robert Mammone
- First appearance: 9 February 2009
- Last appearance: 26 February 2009
- Introduced by: Susan Bower
In-universe information
- Occupation: Farmer
- Wife: Lisa Andrews
- Sons: Trent Andrews

Phil Andrews, played by Robert Mammone, made his first appearance on 9 February 2009. The character and Mammone's casting details were announced in the 3–9 January 2009 issue of TV Week. Of the character, a writer stated "Phil's a mysterious middle-aged man who has kept largely to himself since a family tragedy."

Phil finds Zeke Kinski after he is washed ashore following a rafting accident. Phil convinces Zeke that he is his father and Zeke, who is suffering from a Fugue state, believes him. While researching a story, Elle Robinson (Pippa Black) and Lucas Fitzgerald (Scott Major) find a drawing of Zeke at an artist's stall. After talking to the artist and taking the drawing, Elle and Lucas go to the Andrews farm to wait for Phil. Phil denies knowing the boy in the drawing and he hastily leaves in his truck, leaving Elle and Lucas behind. Elle and Lucas decide to break into Phil's house and they discover a boy's bedroom and one of Zeke's (Matthew Werkmeister) T-shirts. Elle takes the T-shirt, but later decides to return it. When she returns to put it back, she is shocked to find the room has been emptied. Elle goes to Susan Kennedy (Jackie Woodburne), who contacts Sergeant Rick Lawson (Liam Pederson). They go to a lock-up belonging to a friend of Phil's and he explains that Phil had lost his wife and son, Trent, in a car accident. When they eventually speak to Phil he insists he knows nothing about Zeke. Once they leave, Phil makes a call to his apparently dead son Trent, telling him to come home.

Zeke later finds some newspaper cuttings about the deaths of Phil's wife and son and becomes confused. Phil tells him that the newspaper had mixed him up with a friend of his that had died instead. Susan and Karl Kennedy (Alan Fletcher) go back to the lock-up and are stunned to find Zeke alive. Zeke insists that his name is Trent and that he was fine with Phil, the police are called and Phil is arrested. Zeke struggles with his return to Erinsborough and his friends take him to the lock-up, where he finally realises that Phil had lied to him. As he was about to leave, Phil walks in and apologises for what he had done to Zeke. Zeke is angry with him, but he then shook Phil's hand and thanks him for saving his life.

== Cassandra Freedman ==
Cassandra Freedman, played by Tottie Goldsmith, is the mother of Donna, Tegan and Simon Freedman. She made her first on-screen appearance on 10 February 2009. Cassandra has been described as a troublesome Femme fatale, who is manipulative and selfish.

== Adam Clarke ==
Adam Clarke
- Neighbours character
- Portrayed by: Clint Bizzell
- First appearance: 20 March 2009
- Last appearance: 7 April 2009
- Introduced by: Susan Bower
In-universe information
- Occupation: AFL player

Adam Clarke, played by Clint Bizzell, made his first screen appearance on 20 March 2009. Bizzell's casting was publicised on 23 March 2009, although he joined the serial in late 2008 to film his five-week guest role. Bizzell's character, Adam, is an AFL champion, who "initially appears to be a good bloke". However, when Adam befriends Ringo Brown (Sam Clark), he quickly leads him astray.

Adam plays for the Portside Falcons football club and he has become a notorious figure with the press. Adam befriends new player Ringo Brown and he starts manipulating him. During the team's presentation, Adam invites Ringo back to his house for a party. Adam tells Ringo that he cannot bring his friends and that he should ditch them. During a night out, Ringo is told that he will have to go through an initiation. At Adam's house, he is told to strip naked and wait in the bathroom. When he comes out and finds everyone in the early hours of the morning, Adam tells him that he had passed the test. Ringo realises that he is running late for school and Adam offers him a lift in his car, which he also lets Ringo drive. They are pulled over by the police, but the police officer recognises Adam and lets them go. Adam goes into Ringo's school and charms his teacher.

Ringo breaks the rookie sprint record at the club and Adam decides to hire a room at Lassiter's Hotel and throws a party. Declan Napier (James Sorensen) receives complaints about the noise from the room and he eventually throws Adam and everyone else out. Ringo stays to clean up, but Adam returns and encourages Ringo to leave with him. Adam encourages Ringo to quit school to concentrate on his football career. Adam suggests that they go and choose a car for Ringo and during the ride, Adam loses control of his car and crashes into an Easter display. Adam tells Ringo to take the blame for the accident and he does. The press get hold of the story and Adam assures Ringo that everything will be fine. Zeke Kinski (Matthew Werkmeister) overhears them and broadcasts the details on his radio show. Adam and Ringo's coach, Nathan Black (Lyall Brooks) reprimands Adam and sacks Ringo.

== Melissa Evans ==
Melissa Evans
- Neighbours character
- Portrayed by: Kaela Hilton
- Duration: 2009–2010
- First appearance: 2 April 2009
- Last appearance: 5 July 2010
- Introduced by: Susan Bower
In-universe information
- Occupation: PirateNet manager

Melissa Evans, played by Kaela Hilton, made her first screen appearance on 2 April 2009. Melissa was introduced as the manager of the local radio station PirateNet.

When Zeke Kinski (Matthew Werkmeister) returns to Erinsborough following the rafting accident, he finds a new interest when he starts listening to the radio station, PirateNet. After frequently requesting songs, Zeke ends up talking to Melissa about working at PirateNet. Melissa sends him the details of where to find the station and when Zeke turns up, Melissa gives him a lesson in running his own radio deck. He then begins his radio career as "Lost Boy". When Libby Kennedy (Kym Valentine) becomes suspicious about where Zeke is going, she and Daniel Fitzgerald (Brett Tucker) follow him to the radio station and sneak in. Melissa demands to know who they are and Zeke is forced to tell them about his secret identity. A few months later, Zeke is still working at the radio station with Melissa. When Karl Kennedy (Alan Fletcher) comes to see Zeke, Melissa recognises Karl from his medical advice column in the newspaper and suggests that he make for a good guest a slot on Zeke's show. Melissa is pleased with Karl's guest slot and following an appearance by Lily Allen, Melissa decides to offer Karl a permanent place. However, Melissa is forced to sack Karl after he plays one of his own songs. Melissa then asks Sunny Lee (Hany Lee) to come on board as Zeke's new broadcasting partner, "Found Girl".

Following Zeke's arrest, Melissa informs him that the chief sponsor of PirateNet is not impressed by the publicity surrounding Zeke and that she is going to have to suspend him from the station. Kate Ramsay (Ashleigh Brewer) and Susan Kennedy (Jackie Woodburne) suggest that Zeke tell his side of the story to the newspaper, but the publicity makes things worse for the station and Melissa sacks him. When Zeke goes to talk to her, he discovers that the owners of the station's property have decided to sell up. Zeke manages to convince Paul Robinson (Stefan Dennis) to buy the station and PirateNet becomes a commercial station much to Melissa's displeasure.

== Sunny Lee ==
Sunny Lee, played by Hany Lee, made her first on-screen appearance on 8 April 2009. Sunny was created by executive producer Susan Bower in response to criticism that Neighbours was "too white". Lee came to the attention of Neighbours producers after she entered a competition run by Dolly Magazine to win a three-month contract with the show. Sunny is an exchange student from South Korea who is taken in by Karl (Alan Fletcher) and Susan Kennedy (Jackie Woodburne).

== Kate Ramsay ==
Kate Ramsay, played by Ashleigh Brewer, made her first on-screen appearance on 15 May 2009. She is the eldest sibling of Harry (Will Moore) and Sophie Ramsay (Kaiya Jones). In February 2009, it was announced that Neighbours producers were introducing a new generation of the Ramsay family to the show. Brisbane actress Ashleigh Brewer successfully auditioned for the role of Kate. Kate is strong and always feels like she should put other people's needs before her own. Network Ten say that Kate is "a natural leader", commenting that her siblings rely on her to keep the family together.

== Harry Ramsay ==
Harry Ramsay, played by Will Moore, made his first on-screen appearance on 18 May 2009. Speaking of his character being part of the Ramsay family, Moore said "At first I thought "Oh my God, am I supposed to do something special?" Everyone said "Your character's Harry Ramsay? Like Ramsay Street?" So I have those connections, but I got used to playing it after a while. It's pretty cool to be playing a part that has so much history and it's cool that we're related to so many of the original characters – Anne Robinson and Max Ramsay had an affair and had our mum." Harry has been described as a loner, an outcast and unlucky in love.

== Sophie Ramsay ==
Sophie Ramsay, played by Kaiya Jones, made her first on-screen appearance on 18 May 2009. Sophie is the youngest of the Ramsay siblings. Former The Saddle Club actress, Kaiya Jones was cast as Sophie completing the new Ramsay family unit. Jones began filming her scenes with Neighbours in February 2009.

== India Napier ==
India Napier
- Neighbours character
- Portrayed by: Alia and Gabriella De Vercelli; Lily Wouters (dream, 2009)
- Duration: 2009–2011
- First appearance: 23 June 2009
- Last appearance: 15 March 2011
- Introduced by: Susan Bower
In-universe information
- Father: Declan Napier
- Mother: Bridget Parker
- Grandfathers: Richard Aaronow; Steve Parker; Paul Robinson (Step)
- Grandmothers: Rebecca Napier; Miranda Parker; Joanna Hale
- Uncles: Oliver Barnes; Riley Parker
- Aunts: Josie Hale; Clara Hale
- First cousins: Chloe Cammeniti
- Other relatives: Jim Parker; Gary Fuller; Alan Napier; Kitty Parker; Yvonne West; Stuart Parker; Ned Parker; Marcus Napier; Nicola West; Mickey Gannon

India Napier, played by Alia and Gabriella De Vercelli, is the only daughter of Declan Napier and Bridget Parker. She was born on-screen on 23 June 2009.

In 2008, it was announced that a 17-year-old Bridget Parker (Eloise Mignon) was to fall pregnant by her boyfriend Declan Napier (James Sorensen). As the storyline progressed, Bridget was seen considering abortion or adoption, before ultimately deciding to have the child with Declan's support. This caused controversy among conservative family groups and critics in Australia who accused Neighbours of using their characters to normalise teenage pregnancy. The storyline continued despite the controversy it caused.

Alia and Gabriella De Vercelli were cast as India when they were four months old. Their mother, Vanessa De Vercelli, described the girls' working relationship with James Sorensen as "beautiful". She added that Sorensen had been there right from the start and he was like a "real nervous dad". In January 2010, it was announced that Sorensen was to leave Neighbours and the role of Declan was given to Erin Mullally. De Vercelli said that the transition had been "quite well" and that the girls have taken to Mullally. In October 2010, it was announced that the character was to leave Neighbours along with her on-screen father and grandmother after Mullally and Jane Hall quit the show. She departed on 15 March 2011.

Bridget falls pregnant shortly after losing her virginity to Declan. She considers having an abortion after Declan runs away. However, the couple reunite and face the challenge of raising a child together. They marry two weeks before the birth and decide to attend a music festival to celebrate their last weeks of freedom. While Declan is away, Bridget goes into labour in a tent with a St John's Ambulance nurse to help. Declan arrives back just in time to see the birth of a daughter. The baby has breathing difficulties and she has to be air lifted to the hospital where she was later declared fit and well. Bridget and the baby come home the following week. When Declan and Bridget are putting their daughter to sleep, Bridget tells her about her dreams of becoming a doctor and travelling to various countries to help people. Bridget mentions India and she and Declan decide to name their baby, India. Declan and Bridget choose Donna and Ringo Brown to be godparents. On a car trip to Oakey to introduce India to the Parker relatives, the car comes off the road when Steve Parker swerves to avoid a horse. Bridget and India are found together and taken to the hospital. Bridget later dies from her injuries, leaving India without a mother. Declan rejects his daughter, as she looks too much like Bridget. Steve and Miranda decide to take India with them to Oakey, but Declan decides to keep her and raise her by himself.

On the day of India's first birthday, she chokes on a marshmallow and is rushed to the hospital. Declan is upset and worried about his daughter, but she is given the all clear. Paul Robinson pays for a private pediatrician to check her over and Rebecca tells Declan that Paul saved India's life. Callum Jones (Morgan Baker) invites India on his school radio show and interviews her with Declan present. She cries on cue to one of the questions, which makes Declan and Callum laugh. India gets to meet her uncle Oliver (David Hoflin) and cousin Chloe (Daisy Zandveld) when they come to get Declan, India and Rebecca. The family all leave for Portugal.

Upon India's introduction, the Daily Record called her "a screamer" and said "If her lungs are anything to go by, she's set for a great future as an opera singer." The paper said Bridget and Declan are left at their wits' end and cannot work out what is wrong with their daughter. They added "What can be wrong with her? Nothing much, apart from a reluctance to ever take a nap. Clearly she's learning early that Erinsborough is a bizarre place to live - and is keen to check it out early."

== Amanda Fowler ==
Amanda Fowler
- Neighbours character
- Portrayed by: Bella Heathcote
- First appearance: 7 July 2009
- Last appearance: 21 October 2009
- Introduced by: Susan Bower
In-universe information
- Occupation: Student

Amanda Fowler, played by Bella Heathcote, made her first appearance during the episode broadcast on 7 July 2009. Heathcote received the recurring role of Amanda in early 2009. She told Tara Brady of The Irish Times that she previously audition for the show, but did not get the part. She returned when she was 21 to audition for the role of Amanda, but she was concerned that she was too old to play a schoolgirl. She continued, "I remember borrowing a family friend's daughter's school uniform to wear to the audition. Somehow that worked out. And it was so much fun getting to be the Neighbours school bitch." Brady dubbed her character an "unrepentant bully". A reporter for the Daily Record commented that Amanda was out to bring Kate Ramsay (Ashleigh Brewer) down a peg or two during the Deb ball storyline. They added "Can Kate stay one step ahead of her arch enemy? Here's hoping so."

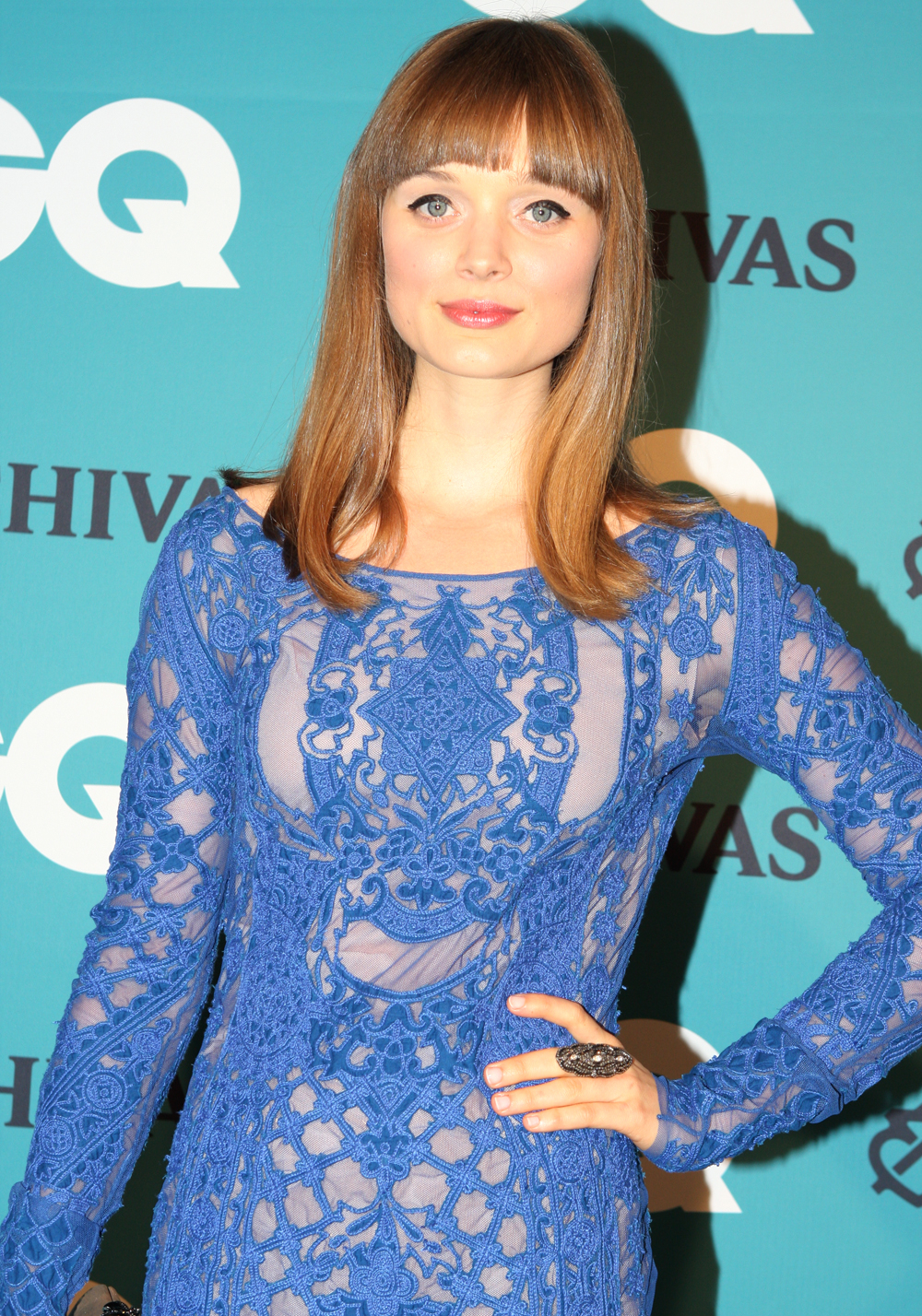
Bella Heathcote began appearing as Amanda in July.

Amanda begins bullying Kate Ramsay shortly after Kate joins Erinsborough High. Bridget Parker (Eloise Mignon) is also attending school for the first time since giving birth and Amanda cannot resist making fun of the pair during the morning. When Bridget stands up to talk to her class, Amanda is happy to announce that Bridget is leaking after her milk leaves damp patches on her jumper. A couple of weeks later, Amanda who is head of the Year 12 charity committee, is left outraged when she is outvoted over who should head the Debutante ball committee, with Kate getting the position. Amanda then goes to see Kate and suggests that she should resign, so they could have a second vote and Amanda could take over. Kate tells Amanda that she is not prepared to do that and Amanda realises that she cannot manipulate Kate easily. As the plans for the Deb ball continue, Amanda and Kate find themselves constantly butting heads and Amanda finds a new way to annoy Kate when she begins to get close to her brother, Harry Ramsay (Will Moore). Amanda tells Harry that he can take her to the Deb ball, much to the frustration of Kate. In response, Kate and Donna Freedman begin scheming to break up Harry and Amanda, causing tension between Harry and Kate. As Kate makes multiple failed attempts to get rid of Amanda, Amanda finally tells Harry that she is going with Kyle Canning (Chris Milligan) instead. This leaves an embarrassed Harry blaming Kate for his rejection at the hands of Amanda, leading to further tension between the siblings.

Amanda's vendetta against Kate grows when Kate announces her plan to get the residents of Erinsborough to cycle in order to produce energy which can be used to power the Deb ball. In addition to her feud with Amanda, Kate’s problems grow when her application to join the Ministry of Dance in order to pursue her dream career as a dancer is rejected by Jason Coleman. Kate’s problems go from bad to worse when one of Amanda’s friends records Kate being rejected by Jason Coleman at the Ministry of Dance, and the footage is then posted online and Kate is humiliated. Kate decides to go ahead with her plans to get everyone to cycle and create enough energy to power the Deb ball. Kate uses the video to her advantage as it publicises her and everyone lines up to volunteer for the cycling, leaving Amanda angry.

Amanda then decides to manipulate Harry again when she finds out he has a crush on her friend Sarah Aquino (Madeline Vizzard). Amanda tells Harry that Sarah would be impressed if he smuggled some alcohol into the ball. Harry manages to get some alcohol, but Amanda tells him that he will have to get it into the ball himself. The bottle is later found by Daniel Fitzgerald (Brett Tucker) and Harry is suspended from school.

Upon discovering that Kate plans on attending the dance with Lou Carpenter (Tom Oliver) as her partner, Amanda again plots to humiliate Kate by arranging for Jason Coleman to be the special guest at the Deb ball. Kate almost decides not to attend, but she changes her mind at the last minute and attends the ball with Declan Napier (James Sorensen). Amanda purposely knocks into Stephanie Scully (Carla Bonner), who spills dip over Kate's dress, reducing Kate to tears and causing her to run and hide in a bathroom cubicle. After being consoled by Declan, Kate agrees to return to the dance. When Kate returns to the dance floor, she dances for Jason Coleman. This leaves Amanda furious that all her plans have come to nothing.

== Josh Burns ==
Josh Burns
- Neighbours character
- Portrayed by: Scott Brennan
- First appearance: 27 July 2009
- Last appearance: 29 October 2009
- Introduced by: Susan Bower
In-universe information
- Occupation: Editor of The West Waratah Star
- Wife: Julianne Burns (until 2009)

Josh Burns, played by Australian comedian Scott Brennan, made his debut screen appearance on 27 July 2009. Josh was the Editor in Chief of The West Waratah Star Newspaper. Brennan's casting was announced in July 2009 and he reportedly signed on for a three-week guest stint.

After quitting the Erinsborough News, Elle Robinson (Pippa Black) is given a job at rival paper The West Waratah Star by Josh. When Bridget Parker (Eloise Mignon) dies following a car accident, Elle is assigned to write a story about the police report, which had shown the car to be faulty. Worried for her boyfriend, Lucas Fitzgerald (Scott Major), she reports back to Josh that she is going to run a different story instead. When Josh finds out the truth about Elle's cover up, he demotes her to the letters page and warns her that he is going to be running a story implicating Lucas and the garage. When Elle found out that the car accident was partly Lucas's fault, as one of his gambling buddies tampered with the Parker's car, she wrote a story about him. Josh tells her that he is not going to publish her personal story, but Elle goes behind his back. When Josh realises what she has done, he tracks her down to Charlie's and hands her a final payslip.

When Elle later gets a job working for a housing development called Waratah Heights, she is asked to write a press release. As she reads the information, Elle realises that the land they were about to build on was industrial and, sensing a story, she went to investigate the site. Josh is also looking into the business dealings at Waratah Heights and he follows her down a manhole. Elle makes it down the rickety ladder, but it gives way while Josh is on it and he falls to the concrete floor. Realising that he is seriously hurt, Elle has to overcame her claustrophobia to crawl through a tunnel and call for help. The paramedics arrive and try to help Josh, but he dies from his internal injuries.

== Jumilla Chandra ==
Jumilla Chandra, played by Alysia Aberyratne, is a university student who worked in Harold's Store to fund her studies. She made her first on-screen appearance on 11 August 2009. Aberyratne is a real-life student who is studying law at Melbourne University. On her role in the soap, Aberyratne said "working part-time on Neighbours is the best job ever!" Jumilla made her final appearance on 7 April 2010.

Jumilla works as one of Lyn Scully's (Janet Andrewartha) store assistants. Kate Ramsay (Ashleigh Brewer) becomes her friend and she is often seen working with both Lyn and Kate. Jumilla knows many of the residents by their first names and is often seen interacting with them when she takes orders. Jumilla is last seen talking to Andrew Robinson (Jordan Smith) about the boxes of cup cakes Lassiter's Hotel had ordered. Kate tells Donna Freedman (Margot Robbie) that Jumilla is going to Sarawak to work in an orphanage and Donna then wonders who is going to make her coffee.

== Sonya Mitchell ==
Sonya Mitchell, played by Eve Morey, made her first screen appearance on 14 August 2009. She was introduced as a guide dog trainer sent to check up on the progress of Toadfish Rebecchi and Callum Jones's puppy, Rocky. Network Ten say Sonya is an animal lover with a "shady past and a broken heart".

== James Linden ==
James Linden
- Neighbours character
- Portrayed by: Tim Ross
- First appearance: 28 August 2009
- Last appearance: 10 September 2009
- Introduced by: Susan Bower
In-universe information
- Occupation: Con Artist

James Linden, played by Tim Ross, is a con man who convinces Donna Freedman that he is her brother, before stealing Elle Robinson's money. He made his first on-screen appearance on 28 August 2009.

James starts talking to Sophie Ramsay (Kaiya Jones) in Harold's Store and he arouses the suspicions of her brother, Harry (Will Moore). James asks Lucas Fitzgerald (Scott Major) for directions to Ramsay Street and says that he knows someone who lives there. He is spotted by Harry and Ringo Brown (Sam Clark) outside the Ramsay house and he claims that he is looking for a house to buy in the area, before leaving. He returns to checks the names on the letters in the mailboxes. Ringo sees James at Lassiter's and asks who is he; James tells him that he is looking for Donna Freedman (Margot Robbie), as he believes that she is his sister. Ringo is suspicious of James and asks him for information. James tells him that he is a music promoter and he had seen Donna's video blog, where she asked to meet her real father. James goes to Donna's house and he explains that their father had died a year ago and he had tried to get in touch, but Donna's mother stopped him. James wins over Donna's friends, except Ringo.

Ringo confronts James when he cannot find the music company James works for on the Internet. James explains that they are new and he gets a manager of one of the bands to prove his identity. James flirts with Donna's guardian, Elle Robinson (Pippa Black), and defends her from her ex-boyfriend. He agrees to a DNA test and when it comes back inconclusive, James tells Donna that there is another, more expensive test they could do. Donna lies to James that Elle had agreed to pay and she transfers the money from Elle's account to his. Both Elle and James are shocked by Donna's actions and Elle wonders if James had pressured Donna into stealing. He denies it and pays Elle back the money. A few days later, he shows Donna the results which prove that he and Donna are related. While he is alone, he uses a programme to download all of Elle's bank details from her laptop to a USB. He then empties her bank account. Everyone gathers at Charlie's bar to see Drastical, a band James had booked. James and the band do not turn up and Declan Napier (James Sorensen) reveals that James's hotel room is empty.

== Robin Hester ==
Robin Hester
- Neighbours character
- Portrayed by: Benjamin Jay
- First appearance: 17 September 2009
- Last appearance: 29 September 2009
- Introduced by: Susan Bower
In-universe information
- Occupation: Student

Robin Hester, played by Benjamin Jay, made his first screen appearance on 17 September 2009. Robin was introduced as a "creepy" teenager who develops an unhealthy obsession with a few of the other teen characters.

Of Robin, Jay told Channel 5, "He's such a weirdo character which is very different from the roles I usually play". The Daily Record called Robin "a creep" and wondered why only Zeke Kinski (Matthew Werkmeister) could see it. The paper also branded Robin "a schemer."

Robin is first heard phoning into Zeke Kinski and Sunny Lee's (Hany Lee) radio show during a conversation about relationships. Robin later turns up at the Kennedy house under the pretence of interviewing Karl Kennedy (Alan Fletcher). Susan Kennedy (Jackie Woodburne) decides to introduce him to Harry Ramsay (Will Moore) because Robin tells her that he does not really have any friends. Harry soon gets fed up with him and introduces him to the other teens. Zeke soon became annoyed with Robin appearing every time and trying to make moves on Sunny. Zeke tries to tell Sunny that Robin has a crush on her, but she dismisses his ideas and tells him that Robin is just being friendly. One evening, Robin climbs through Sunny's bedroom window and, after taking a photo of her, has to hide under her bed when she walks in with Zeke. He overhears them talking about Zeke's anxiety disorder and Robin mentions this to Sunny and Susan during dinner the next day, which makes Sunny think that this is the reason Zeke doesn't like Robin. Zeke later attacks Robin in the General Store for flirting with Sunny in front of Susan, who believes that his anxiety disorder is back.

One night at PirateNet, Robin locks Zeke in a storeroom, so Robin can spend more time with Sunny. Harry gets suspicious that Zeke hasn't come home and decides to look for him. Sunny and Robin go back to the radio station to see if Zeke is there and Robin pretends to find the storeroom key on the ground and unlocks the door, letting Zeke out. Zeke tells Sunny that Robin locked him in the storeroom, but she refuses to believe him. The next day Zeke attacks Robin again, scaring Sunny. Zeke apologises and then tells her that Robin didn't call him the night before like he said he had. Sunny realises that Zeke was right all along and they hatch a plan to confront Robin at Charlie's. Sunny tells Robin that she and Zeke have broken up and Robin confesses to locking Zeke in the storeroom, he then tries to kiss Sunny, but Zeke appears and asks him to stay away from her. Robin later re-appears at the radio station and smashes up Zeke's studio, Zeke finds him and locks him in and calls the police. Before he is taken away, Robin tells Zeke that he is lonely as his adoptive parents do not pay him any attention.

== Saffron Jankievicz ==
Saffron Jankievicz
- Neighbours character
- Portrayed by: Shanyn Asmar
- Duration: 2009–2010
- First appearance: 22 September 2009
- Last appearance: 8 March 2010
- Introduced by: Susan Bower
In-universe information
- Occupation: Fashion designer

Saffron Jankievicz, played by Shanyn Asmar, made her first screen appearance on 22 September 2009. Saffron is a fashion designer who gives Donna Freedman an internship with her company. She made her first appearance on-screen on 22 September 2009. Asmar's agent asked her if she wanted to audition for Neighbours, as they had requested her. Asmar described Saffron saying she comes from a working-class family and that she has worked hard to make a name for herself. Asmar said "She is not the most easy going person unfortunately, probably due to the fact that she never sleeps and lives on coffee and pretzels and needs to eat". Asmar partly based the character on some people she knew when she was a model and a couple of her school teachers. She added that Saffron was "scary and mean". A writer for the Daily Record said Saffron was "a woman so vile she makes Janine Butcher look like a pussycat, and Alexis Carrington a candidate for mother of the year."

When Donna Freedman (Margot Robbie) spots a magazine article about her favourite fashion designer, Saffron Jankievicz, appearing in the city at a fashion show, she decides that she has to go meet her. Even though the show is VIPs only, Donna believes that it is too much of an opportunity to miss and it is her only chance to meet and impress Saffron. At the fashion show Donna attempts numerous times to get past the bouncers who refuse to let her in and she decides that she needs Ringo Brown's (Sam Clark) help. When Ringo arrives, Donna tells the bouncers that he plays for the Dingoes and, the bouncers being fans, let them through. Donna speaks to Saffron for a few minutes and Saffron is impressed with Donna's Skelt (a scarf used as a belt) design. After seeing that Saffron used her Skelt idea in her show and overhears Saffron taking credit for it, Donna decides to go to Saffron's studio the next day to confront her. Taking Sunny Lee (Hany Lee) with her to help, Donna eventually sees Saffron who offers her an unpaid internship at her company. Donna was excited to be working with her idol and even Saffron's constant changing moods didn't stop her from working there. Donna eventually begins to skip school and neglect her friends and chores to work on the show, much to Paul's annoyance.

After Saffron's show is deemed unsuccessful, she blames the employees for it. Donna finally decides to stand up for herself after being treated terribly and she tells Saffron that she is quitting the job to focus on her school work. Saffron then slaps Donna and tells her that she will not amount to anything. Donna later tells Elle Robinson (Pippa Black) and Rebecca Robinson (Jane Hall) what happened and they convince her to press charges against Saffron. The case doesn't go to court, but to mediation. With no witnesses, it was the word of Saffron against Donna. In the toilets, Saffron warns Donna that the Melbourne fashion industry is small and if Donna goes through with mediation, she would struggle to find anyone to take her on. Donna then decides to drop the charges, but outside Ringo sees Saffron snapping at her assistant, who had turned up with some samples, and he saw a chance to help. He takes the assistant for coffee and convinces her to speak up about Saffron's behaviour. Back at mediation, the assistant arrives and announces that Saffron once slapped her and mentions that she had similarly abused many members of her staff. Realising that she'd lost, Saffron was forced to come clean about everything and apologize to Donna. During one of Donna's university classes, Saffron is revealed to be a guest speaker. She manages to turn the whole class against Donna. Donna eventually confronts her once again and tells her that mediation was hell for her, Saffron leaves when Donna receives a round of applause.

== Mia Zannis ==
Mia Zannis
- Neighbours character
- Portrayed by: Alicia Bonaddio
- Duration: 2009–2010
- First appearance: 24 November 2009
- Last appearance: 17 March 2010
- Introduced by: Susan Bower
In-universe information
- Occupation: Student

Mia Zannis, played by Alicia Bonaddio, is an animal activist. She made her first on-screen appearance on 24 November 2009. Mia begins a relationship with Zeke Kinski.

Executive producer, Susan Bower said "Mia is 18, hot, smart, loves dance music and is always eager to meet new people and have a good time. But her breezy demeanour hides a passion for serious topics like climate change and, in particular, animal rights". Bower added that Mia is a young woman with principles, who is always willing to "fight the good fight".

Zeke Kinski (Matthew Werkmeister) meets Mia at a party during Schoolies week and is instantly attracted to her. Mia later shows up in Erinsborough claiming that she wanted to see Zeke, but he discovers that she is involved in an animal activist group, which plans to "hit" the Elliot Park testing facility. Zeke asks to go along with Mia and her group, which they agree to and he helps plan a way into the building. During the raid, the group are unable to get through a door with a key code and an alarm is set off. Mia runs away and Zeke is caught by security and arrested for breaking and entering.

When Zeke attends community service as set by the judge, Mia turns up too and tells Zeke that she was caught during another raid. She tells him that her friends have gone to jail and her grandfather got sick when he heard about her arrest. Mia tells Zeke that they cannot be together as none of his family or friends want her around. Zeke tells her that it will be okay and to come over to dinner at the Kennedy house that evening. When Karl Kennedy (Alan Fletcher) sees Mia he tells Zeke that she is not welcome and Mia runs to Charlie's, Zeke tells her that Karl will come around. Zeke later decides to get Mia and Karl to come on his radio show, but they clash again. Mia then overhears Karl telling Zeke that he is throwing his life away. At Harold's Store, Mia apologizes to Karl and he accepts, Zeke then tells him that he's decided to attend university and that his condition for going is Karl agreeing to take it easy on Mia. Zeke introduces Mia to Kate Ramsay (Ashleigh Brewer), Declan Napier (James Sorensen) and Donna Freedman (Margot Robbie) at Charlie's, Kate and Declan are unhappy that Zeke is still with Mia because of the trouble she got him in. Zeke, Mia and Donna later attend a protest at another testing facility, which Mia promises will be peaceful. However, the security are suspicious and when Mia tries to get Zeke to enter the testing facility, they are caught and taken to the police station. It is later revealed that Mia struck a deal with Detective Alec Skinner (Kevin Summers) to get Zeke to confess to being the ring leader of the animal activist group. Mia transfers computer files containing maps to the house of the animal testing facility's CEO on to Zeke's laptop and tells Detective Skinner that he will find everything he needs to arrest Zeke. Mia gets Zeke to go to a house, where she says her grandfather lives and tells him to climb through a window as she has forgotten her keys. Just as Zeke is climbing through the window, Detective Skinner arrives and arrests him and Mia. At the station Zeke tells Mia he knew what was going on the whole time as Donna had played him a sound clip of her talking with Skinner. Zeke then tells Skinner that Mia is the ringleader and he is willing to testify against her.

== Others ==
Date(s)	Character	Actor	Circumstances
29 January–29 June	Brooke Mitchell	Klaire Gazzo	A nurse at Erinsborough Hospital. When Charlie Hoyland is brought in following an accident at the garage, Brooke asks Stephanie Scully to fill out some paper work. A few weeks later, Brooke assists when Harold Bishop is rushed in following a heart attack. She also assists when Libby Kennedy suffers a miscarriage.
17–24 February	Rick Lawson	Liam Pederson	When Susan Kennedy contacts the police about Zeke Kinski's disappearance, Sergeant Rick Lawson accompanies her to the lock-up where Phil Andrews had been staying. When Susan and Karl Kennedy return to the lock-up a few days later, they find Zeke. Sergeant Lawson returns, apologising for not believing Susan and has Phil taken away for questioning.
25–26 February	Joanna Hale	Laura Lattuada	The biological mother of Riley and Bridget Parker. Bridget asks the adoption agency to contact Joanna for her and Joanna begins to follow Bridget, before leaving her a large amount of money. Miranda Parker tells her husband that she paid Joanna to keep out of Bridget's life. Declan Napier meets Joanna and Bridget follows him and comes face to face with her mother. Joanna tells Bridget that when Riley was four, she fell pregnant with Bridget and her husband died. She suffered a breakdown and decided to put the children into care. Joanna says she remarried and had two more daughters, which upsets Bridget. Bridget gives Joanna the money back and tells her to stay out of her life.
12–18 March	Lisa Hayes	Anna Jennings-Edquist	A legal secretary, who approaches Steve Parker in Charlie's bar for a chat. Steve buys her a drink and she tells him that she prefers older men. When Steve returns from the toilets, he sees that Lisa's boyfriend, Lucas Fitzgerald, has arrived. During a date, Lucas cannot stop looking at Elle Robinson and he later turns down Lisa's invite back to her place. Lisa is Jennings-Edquist's second role with Neighbours.
23–30 March	Rhys Sutton	Aaron Jakubenko	An AFL footballer for the Portside Falcons and a teammate of Adam Clarke. Rhys, along with the others, encourage new player Ringo Brown to party with them at Lassiter's and generally misbehave.
30 March–1 April	Ashley Black	Sophie Weiss	The daughter of AFL football coach Nathan Black. She is a football groupie who pursues Ringo Brown and tries to get him in trouble with her father.
13–14 May	Dean Naughton	Peter Bensley	Miranda Parker's ex-university lecturer. Miranda reveals that she was still in love with Dean when she married Steve Parker. Dean arrives for a conference at Lassiter's Hotel, where Miranda is working. He is surprised to see her and Miranda's feelings for Dean resurface when they spend time together. They go out to dinner and Miranda later sleeps with Dean. However, she realises that it was a mistake and leaves Dean's hotel suite. Bensley previously appeared in Neighbours as Tony Chapman in 1986.
18 May–26 October	Jill Ramsay	Perri Cummings	The mother of Kate, Harry and Sophie Ramsay. Jill is the illegitimate daughter of Anne Robinson and Max Ramsay. Elle Robinson discovers Jill's existence when she reads Helen Daniels' will. Kate tells Elle that Jill was involved in a hit and run accident and Jill dies later that day. Jill later reappears in a set of visions to Kate.
23 June	Trisha Day	Katherine Tonkin	A paramedic who helps deliver India Napier at a music festival.
26 June 2009–20 July 2010	Rocky	Hughie	A Labrador puppy, who is raised by Toadfish Rebecchi and his son Callum Rebecchi to become a guide dog for the blind. Callum is initially reluctant to bond with Rocky, but he soon takes an active role in his training, which is overseen by Sonya Mitchell. After a year with the Rebecchis, Rocky undergoes his assessment, which he passes. He leaves the same day in order to be placed with someone with sight loss. The real-life dog was re-named Hughie, and he underwent guide dog training from May 2010 until November 2010.
3 July–11 August	Johnno Brewer	Damien Aylward	A professional gambler who contacts Lucas Fitzgerald about a poker game at the garage. Lucas borrows money from Johnno and after he loses it, he runs away. Johnno trashes the garage and takes all the money from the till. He comes back and threatens to break the windscreen of a car, unless he gets his money. Johnno orders Lucas to be beaten up, but Lucas calls Daniel Fitzgerald for money. The Parker family are involved in an accident, after their car is serviced at the garage. Dan discovers that Johnno tampered with the car as he believed it was Lucas'. Lucas finds Johnno and he is arrested and bailed. Declan Napier confronts him and records Johnno's confession. It is revealed that Paul Robinson told Johnno to confess in return for a good lawyer, who would keep him out of prison. However, Paul tells the lawyer to make sure Johnno goes to prison for a long time.
4 August 2009–11 January 2011	Christian Doran	Adrian Woolcock	A paramedic introduced to Ringo Brown by Karl Kennedy. Christian gives Ringo a tour of the ambulance and some advice about becoming a paramedic. Christian is later called to treat Josh Burns, who injures himself investigating a story. Ringo begins his first day as a paramedic with Christian. Shortly after Ringo dies, Christian rings him to let him know his schedule for the week and speaks to Donna Freedman. He asks her what is wrong, but Donna hangs up. Christian attends a fire at Number 26 and Karl tells him that there are four people in the house with possible smoke inhalation and burns.
15 August 2009–29 January 2011	Dale McGregor	John Kim	An Erinsborough High student, who teases Harry Ramsay when he spots that Harry has no friends on Facebook. He is humiliated by Summer Hoyland after he teases a girl in their class and he later makes fun of Chris Pappas after he comes out as gay. Macca attends schoolies week and later points out that Andrew Robinson's new tattoo says "Pickles".
30 September 2009–21 January 2011	Lindsey Stace	Vanessa Crouch	Saffron Jankievicz's personal assistant. Lindsey gives Donna Freedman menial tasks to do, like sticking adhesive to the bottom of shoes, so they would not slip on the runway and getting the coffee orders. After a show, Lindsay asks Donna to come to a party. Weeks later, Donna takes legal action against Saffron after she hits her. Ringo Brown sees Saffron shouting at Lindsey and he convince her to speak up about Saffron. She announces that Saffron had once hit her too. Lindsey goes to a fashion conference at Lassiter's and bumps into Donna. She tells her that she left Saffron and is starting her own business. Lindsey asks about Ringo, but Donna walks away.
12 October 2009 – 8 March 2010	Sarah Aquino	Madeleine Vizard	A student at Erinsborough High and a friend of Amanda Fowler. Harry Ramsay wants Sarah to be his date to the Deb ball and he asks her out. Sarah turns him down, but she tells Harry to make up her excuse to save face with his friends. Kate Ramsay discovers that Sarah is going to the ball with Kyle Canning, because she was pushed into it by Amanda. Sarah is later seen at Eden University attending the same Visual merchandising class as Donna Freedman. Following Donna's achievement in their first project, Sarah invites her to Charlie's for drinks.
29 October	Julianne Burns	Rhona Rees	The wife of Josh Burns who turns up to the housing development, where Elle Robinson breaks the news to her that Josh has died.
4 December 2009, 2–3 December 2010	Edmund Gwenn	Chris Gaffney	A marriage celebrant who marries Rebecca Napier and Paul Robinson at Charlie's. He later goes to Ramsay Street to judge the Christmas lights competition. The following year, Paul contacts Eddie again and asks him to perform a vow renewal ceremony for him and Rebecca.
