= Summer Hoyland =

- Neighbours character
- Jordy Lucas as Summer Hoyland (2012)
- Portrayed by: Marisa Siketa (2002–2007); Jordy Lucas (2010–2023)
- Duration: 2002–2007, 2010–2013, 2023
- First appearance: 20 May 2002
- Last appearance: 4 December 2023
- Introduced by: Stanley Walsh (2002); Ric Pellizzeri (2006); Susan Bower (2010); Jason Herbison (2023)
- Marisa Siketa as Summer Hoyland (2007)
In-universe information
- Occupation: Student; Paper girl; Waitress; Journalist; Podcaster
- Father: Max Hoyland
- Mother: Claire Hoyland
- Stepmother: Stephanie Scully
- Brothers: Boyd Hoyland
- Half-brothers: Charlie Hoyland
- Grandfathers: Bobby Hoyland
- Grandmothers: Rosie Hoyland
- Aunts: Izzy Hoyland
- First cousins: Holly Hoyland
- Other relatives: Colin Barclay

Summer Hoyland is a fictional character from the Australian soap opera Neighbours, played by Jordy Lucas. She made her first screen appearance during the episode broadcast on 20 May 2002. The character was originally played by Marisa Siketa from her arrival to her departure in 2005 and her subsequent returns in 2006 and 2007. In October 2009, it was announced that the character was to return to the show. Siketa auditioned for her previous role, but producers felt the character had evolved too much. They decided to cast Lucas instead after she came to their attention during Dolly magazine's "Neighbours Next Big Stars" competition. Summer returned on 11 February 2010. Lucas announced her departure from Neighbours in September 2012 and Summer departed on 10 January 2013. Lucas reprised the role on 30 November 2023.

== Casting ==
Marisa Siketa had previously completed three years of acting training before she auditioned for the role of Summer on Neighbours. Siketa played the role for four years, before she chose to quit the show and concentrate on her studies. She made brief appearances in 2006 and 2007. In October 2009, it was revealed that the character would be returning to Neighbours the following year. Executive producer, Susan Bower had decided to bring the character back, but announced that Siketa would not be reprising the role. In an interview with Inside Soap, Bower revealed that they had auditioned Siketa, but felt the character had evolved too much and decided against casting her again. Jordy Lucas was chosen for the role instead. Lucas came to the attention of the producers when she came second in Dolly magazine's "Neighbours Next Big Stars" competition. She then successfully auditioned for the role of Summer.

During an interview with Network Ten, Lucas said of her casting, "I would have never of thought that this would be happening, I would have never ever-ever imagined in a million years that I would be playing a role that I used to watch on TV years ago, it's really surreal." She also added "There was a lot of pressure taking on a role that was already played by Marisa Siketa, I watched footage back and she did a really good job establishing the character and she obviously had a big following". In a different interview Lucas said that the return would bring a whole new mystery to the character. She added her worries of playing a character that was already established with viewers, explaining, "There is a bit of added pressure – people already have an idea of how they want her to be. I did a lot of research into the role, but Summer has come back as a young woman after leaving as a child, so it's only fair that people should expect a change". In December 2011, a reporter for the Herald Sun announced Lucas had extended her contract with Neighbours until late 2013.

== Development ==
=== Characterisation ===
During her early days in the series Summer was known for being naughty and the "resident trouble-maker." A writer for the BBC's Neighbours website described her as having "The face of angel and the mind of a career criminal." Summer was also very good at wrapping people around her finger. The BBC writer called Summer a "mini-Mrs Mangel in the making" as she often overheard things she should not and gossiped about them afterwards. Siketa described Summer as "Funny, Mischievous, Bubbly." Summer did have another side to her personality, in which she was "delightful, kind and considerate." She developed close relationships with older women following her mother's death and she loved her brother, Boyd (Kyal Marsh). When her father started dating Stephanie Scully (Carla Bonner), Summer accepted the relationship and was more mature about it than Boyd.

Upon her return in 2010, Summer had changed her attitude. Of this, Lucas stated "She's more feisty than anything. She has her own moral code and set of rules that she wants to stick by, and she's not afraid to bend the rules at school. But when it comes down to it, she's a sensitive girl and she's very kind. She wants to look after people." Lucas also described the character on another occasion stating that Summer was now smart and feisty, and she stands up for the things she believes in. Of her dramatic change in personality she said: "I think at the same time she's gone away, she's matured into a young woman, she has changed, so there are things that are going to be different about her, so as much as people are going to miss Marisa playing her hopefully they can embrace the new Summer."

Summer is expelled from her music school and she comes to Ramsay Street to see Steph and prove to her father that she can get things sorted out. Summer has grown up, but Lucas said there is a "crazy, reckless side to her." Susan Bower said that Summer and Natasha Williams (Valentina Novakovic) spark because Summer is "a feminist, and she fights for causes and sticks up for the underdog". Lucas explained that when Summer and Natasha are friends, the storylines tend to be lighter. However, when they are at each other, Lucas said it is fun as she and Novakovic are not like that in real life, so it is something different for them. When asked if she was similar to Summer, Lucas revealed "I certainly have an opinion about lots of different subjects, but I don't go to the lengths that Summer does." Lucas told the Herald Sun in May 2011 that she would like to see Summer "go off the rails a bit more" and start hanging out with a bad crowd as she is "such a goody two shoes."

=== Chris Pappas ===
Summer begins a relationship with Chris Pappas (James Mason) in May 2010. They date for three months before Chris reveals that he is gay. Summer initially takes the news well. She plays it down and explains that she is dealing with it. The Herald Sun's Alice Clarke said Summer dealt with the news that Chris was gay "extremely well." When asked if she would react in the same way as Summer, Lucas told Clarke "There's no denying that it would be a really difficult thing to go through, but you have to respect that it's an even harder thing that they're going through." Chris and Summer become good friends and Mason said "Chris is determined to help Summer through whatever comes in the future, and really just stick by her. It's a good friendship that evolves even though it's been such an ordeal." Chris later tries to prove to Summer that he is a good friend by playing Cupid for her. Chris becomes a wingman for Summer and helps her to find someone else to date as he feels guilty for hurting her. Daniel Kilkelly from Digital Spy said Summer's friendship with Chris has been nice to watch and when he asked Lucas if she was happy that Mason is staying in the show, she said, "I think it's fantastic that the Chris character is staying on and will evolve over time – he provides a voice of reason for the other characters who all fire up so quickly. And I love working with James [Mason], he is one of the nicest people you'll ever meet."

=== Relationship with Andrew Robinson ===
Summer becomes involved in a love triangle with Andrew Robinson (Jordan Patrick Smith) and Natasha Williams. Summer likes Andrew, but he breaks her heart by dating Natasha. Andrew thinks he is doing the right thing, as Lyn Scully (Janet Andrewartha) warned him to stay away and Summer is dealing with her stepmother being sent to jail. Andrew and Natasha organise a party and Andrew is surprised at his feelings when Summer turns up. He later expresses concern for her when she collapses, which makes Natasha realise she needs to get rid of Summer. Natasha warns Summer to stay away from Andrew, while she is in the hospital. Lucas told Holy Soap that she was backing the pairing of Summer and Andrew and wanted things between them to move along. She said "It's a lot of fun to play the tortured teenager in love, but it's been going on for about a year and half now so it would be nice for Summer to just have something that really makes her happy in her life. Every time she gets something that makes her happy, something happens to destroy it." Lucas revealed that fans had sent her videos of Summer and Andrew they had made on YouTube and she commented that "Everyone seems to love Andrew and Summer."

In December 2010, it was revealed that Summer and Andrew would give into their feelings for each other before they become trapped in a house fire. The storyline begins when Andrew becomes jealous of Summer going on a date with his business partner, Tomas Bersky (Tim Munley). Andrew tries to warn Summer off Tomas, which makes Summer happy as this means he likes her. While Tomas is "charming", Andrew is the one Summer wants and she would not consider being with anyone else. Lucas explained that Andrew believed Summer was too good for him, but seeing her with Tomas is a wake-up call. Summer tells Andrew that she has wanted to be with him since the day they met and Lucas said "Summer has desperately wanted to say this to Andrew for so long, but she's been scared of getting hurt. Andrew also knows that if he doesn't act now and let Summer know how he feels, it'll be too late." While they are together, a fire breaks out and Natasha goes in to save Summer, not knowing Andrew is there too. Summer and Lyn move in with the Williams family and Summer is forced to watch Andrew carry on his relationship with Natasha.

Summer is devastated when Andrew tells her Natasha is pregnant and she believes they are back at square one. When she was asked if Summer would try to win Andrew back, Lucas said "No, because she feels she has to respect the fact that Andrew has this responsibility of having a child. I don't think this is something she wants to get involved with." Summer becomes suspicious about Natasha's pregnancy as she knows that Natasha likes to play games. Though she knows she does not want to come across as a jealous ex-girlfriend. Summer discovers that Natasha's ultrasound scan photos are fake and she realises Natasha has been lying about being pregnant. Summer then reveals the truth to Andrew. Summer later tells Andrew that they cannot be together and Lucas explained that Summer feels that the situation with Natasha never would have happened if they had not cheated on her. She added "And I guess she feels that the whole situation is way too messy and that Andrew has a whole lot of baggage to sort out, and this is not the right time to start a relationship." Lucas admitted that Summer and Andrew deserve to be together as they have been through a lot and they have a good chemistry. When asked if Summer and Natasha would be friends again, Lucas said "They have both done the wrong thing. Summer cheated with her boyfriend, Tash with the fake pregnancy; they have both been guilty of doing the wrong thing."

Lucas told What's on TV that Summer and Andrew "have a lot to resolve" after the conclusion to the love triangle storyline. Natasha decides to get Summer and Andrew back together, making Summer suspicious of her motives. Natasha tries to get Andrew and Summer to talk through their issues, but when they get together they argue and Andrew claims Summer is always judging him. When asked if Summer is aware of this, Lucas said "Not initially. Summer does have a tendency to take the high moral ground on issues and is very head-strong. Admitting she is wrong or overreacting doesn't come easily to her!" Andrew then kisses Lisa Devine (Sophie Tilson) in front of Summer, leaving her gutted. Lucas said that while it would be nice for Summer and Andrew to end up together, she believes they are more interesting when their relationship is strained. When Lyn announces the family is relocating to Bendigo, Summer is devastated at the thought of leaving Andrew. However, just as Lyn is driving out of Ramsay Street, Andrew runs after the car and declares his love for Summer. Summer decides to stay in Erinsborough to be with Andrew and they finally begin a relationship.

In January 2012, it was confirmed Summer and Andrew would break up during the year. Lucas told Digital Spy's Daniel Kilkelly that Summer is going to be heartbroken when she realises her relationship with Andrew is not working out as well as it was. The actress explained "Summer absolutely loves Andrew and she doesn't want to break up with him, but the pressure of their relationship and them going in different directions definitely takes a toll on them." Lucas believed the couple would be over for good, but stated they could reunite in the future as they love each other so much. Lucas revealed there could be a potential love interest for Summer, but she realises that she still hurts over Andrew and decides to focus on herself a bit more.

=== Cheating ===
Summer decides to pursue a career in journalism and has to put together a portfolio for the university course she wants to get on to. She decides to use camera footage of the Erinsborough History Wall being completed as the subject of her portfolio. However, Summer is devastated when Andrew tells her he has accidentally deleted the footage. Lucas said the project meant a lot to Summer, but she is more upset about Andrew's casual attitude to the accident. Viewers were aware that Andrew deleted the footage on purpose to protect his cousin, Kate Ramsay (Ashleigh Brewer), a student teacher who was captured on tape kissing a pupil. When asked what Summer would have done if she had seen the footage, Lucas said "Summer always tries to do the right thing and I'm not sure she would have thought making it public would have been the right thing to do, so I'm leaning toward protecting Kate." Losing the footage puts Summer's portfolio in jeopardy, so she is determined to do well in her English VCE exam. However, her study plans have been derailed in the process and she decides to cheat. Lucas told Digital Spy's Daniel Kilkelly that Summer photographs some of the verses she needs for the exam with her phone, before hiding it in the bathroom. When she becomes stuck on a question, she elects to go ahead with her plan to cheat, without thinking she could be caught. Summer goes to the bathroom to check her phone and Michael enters asking what is taking so long. Summer's phone starts to ring and Michael realises what is going on. He and Summer then fight over the phone.

During the argument, Michael collapses and Summer blames herself. Lucas told a writer for TV Week "She knows Michael's been going through a lot of stress with Tash and her finding out about her mum's death, but at that moment, Summer feels like, 'I'm the straw that broke the camel's back'." Summer calls an ambulance and she feels even more guilty when she is branded a hero. When Michael recovers, Summer is surprised to discover that he does not remember their encounter. Summer's secret starts to eat away at her and she confides in Chris and Andrew, who have two different views on the situation. Andrew encourages Summer to keep quiet and she does. In February 2012, Kilkelly reported the storyline would be picked up again when Michael remembers what happened. Michael's memories of that day return and he threatens to report Summer for cheating. Andrew intervenes and begs Michael to keep quiet, while Natasha is "furious" to learn about Summer's lies. Summer owns up to cheating in her exam and she is forced to go back to school and repeat Year 12.

=== Departure ===
In early September 2012, Lucas announced her departure from Neighbours. Of her decision to leave, she stated "I've had a fantastic three years at Neighbours and I am really looking forward to what my future has to offer." Lucas filmed her final scenes during the week beginning 17 September. A Channel 5 website writer said the character's exit storyline would "raise a few eyebrows, with Summer finding herself embroiled in a romance that will test her moral compass." On 11 September, Darren Devlyn from news.com.au reported that Summer would develop a relationship with older journalist Bradley Fox (Aaron Jeffery). The relationship sees Summer leave "amid controversy." Her departure aired on 10 January 2013.

On 20 November 2023, Lucas announced on social media that she would be returning to the serial for a short stint by posting a photo with Jackie Woodburne (who plays Susan Kennedy). Of her return, she stated, "So special to head back to the place that changed my life forever." Lucas had previously explained that she would be open to returning to Neighbours, telling a reporter for Digital Spy: "I have nothing but fond memories of my time on the show, and if they were to ask me back, I would jump at the chance." Lucas returned as part of a storyline that sees past students protesting against the closure of Erinsborough High School.

== Storylines ==
=== 2002–2007 ===
Summer arrives in Ramsay Street selling boxes of stale chocolates, while claiming the money would be going to charity. Her grandmother Rosie (Maggie Millar) introduces her to the neighbours and Summer later exposes Rosie's relationship with Lou Carpenter (Tom Oliver) to Harold Bishop (Ian Smith). Summer's brother, Boyd also arrives and they both realise that Number 32 would make a great home. Summer develops a crush on Drew Kirk (Dan Paris). She later breaks into his house and saves his baby son, Ben (Noah Sutherland), from a termite extermination. Summer begins suffering from fainting spells and she is diagnosed with Long QT syndrome. She later has an operation to improve her condition. Summer's father, Max (Stephen Lovatt), returns from working on the Oil rigs and the family move into Number 32.

As a result of having lost her mother at an early age, when Summer grows close to Stephanie Scully (Carla Bonner), she begins to see her as a substitute mother and a potential love interest for Max. Summer is threatened by Jacinta Martin (Eliza Taylor-Cotter) who wants her to give up her paper round. Boyd's girlfriend later tells Jacinta to back off. Summer is happy when Steph and Max begin dating and that her aunt Izzy (Natalie Bassingthwaighte) comes to stay. Summer goes on her first date with Declan Sands (Lewis Reed) and she experiences a bad first kiss with him. She breaks up with him and he starts dating her best friend, Lisa (Rhiannon Fish). Summer then dates Caleb Wilson (Joss Kasper), the son of a billionaire, but he breaks up with her as he meets someone else. He later returns and they start dating again until Caleb wants to take things further and Summer dumps him. Summer becomes friends with new neighbour Bree Timmins (Sianoa Smit-McPhee) when she moves into the street.

Summer is put forward for a scholarship to the Gillard School of Performance and Music in Wangaratta, by her music teacher. Summer passes the exam and she moves to the school. At the end of term, she returns home and finds that Bree has become friends with Rachel Kinski (Caitlin Stasey). Summer feels left out by Bree and Rachel, but she and Rachel eventually make friends. A few months later, Max brings Summer home to recover after she contracts Dengue fever in Fiji following a visit to Rosie. Steph gives birth to Charlie and Summer is happy to have a baby brother. Summer catches up with Bree, Rachel and Zeke Kinski (Matthew Werkmeister) before going back to school. Summer returns briefly to see Boyd marry Janae Timmins (Eliza Taylor-Cotter). Max and Steph's marriage ends and Summer thinks about returning home, but Lyn Scully tells her to stay at her school for her father. Steph tells Summer that she would always be welcome to visit her and Charlie.

=== 2010–2023 ===
Summer is expelled from Gillard and she returns to Erinsborough to stay with Lyn and Steph. She captures the attentions of Harry Ramsay (Will Moore) and Andrew Robinson. Summer decides to host a small party, but it is ruined when Andrew posts the details on Facebook. Although she is angry with Andrew, she convinces him to stay in Erinsborough when he tries to leave. Summer immediately clashes with Natasha Williams. Harry and Summer kiss, but their relationship is ruined when Natasha tells Summer that Harry and Andrew had a competition to win her. Summer then begins dating Chris Pappas (James Mason). When Natasha breaks up with Andrew, Summer helps her get revenge on him. Chris comes out as gay and although shocked, Summer supports him. Summer tells everyone that she is fine, but she later breaks down in front of Chris. Summer tries to help Andrew find out who pushed his father, Paul (Stefan Dennis), from the Lassiter's Hotel mezzanine. Chris realises that Summer has feelings for Andrew and he encourages her to tell him.

Andrew and Summer organise the entertainment for the school social and they attend a meeting with Tomas Bersky. Summer becomes uncomfortable with Tomas' flirting and Andrew kisses her to put Tomas off. Summer later learns Andrew has got back together with Natasha. She collapses at a party, due to drinking too much caffeine which affected her heart condition. Natasha warns Summer to stay away from Andrew and Summer goes on a date with Tomas. Andrew comes to see her and they have sex, unaware a fire has broken out in the next room. Summer and Andrew wake up and realise they and Michael (Sandy Winton) and Natasha are trapped. The firefighters rescue them all and Summer only suffers smoke inhalation. Andrew and Summer agree to date in secret, but Andrew reveals that Natasha is pregnant and ends the relationship. Summer becomes suspicious about Natasha's pregnancy and after learning that Natasha's ultrasound scan photos are fake, she exposes the lie. Summer then tells Andrew that they cannot be together after everything that has happened.

Summer and Natasha apologise to each other. After she discovers that Andrew covered up Tomas's drug dealing, Summer tells him that she no longer respects him. While attending Lisa Devine's party, Summer and Andrew argue and he kisses Lisa. Lyn tells Summer that they are moving to Bendigo to be nearer to Steph. As they are leaving the street, Andrew chases after the car and tells Summer that he loves her. Summer chooses to stay in Ramsay Street and she moves in with Karl (Alan Fletcher) and Susan Kennedy. Summer convinces Andrew to attend university after he leaves high school, which annoys Paul, as he wanted Andrew to take over the family businesses. Paul offers Summer an internship at the Erinsborough News and she accepts. She submits an article about the community gardens, but Paul publishes an edited version. Summer is not pleased with the result and posts her original article on the newspaper's website. Paul then fires her.

Dane Canning (Luke Pegler) tells Summer that the local council is corrupt and she decides to use the story for her journalism portfolio and her PirateNet radio show. Summer is delighted when she passes her journalism entry exam. Toadfish Rebecchi (Ryan Moloney) explains to Summer that the council is not corrupt nor have they taken bribes to rush through a proposed development. He asks her to retract her story, but before she can, the council shut PirateNet down. Summer organises a protest, but it clashes with an exam and eventually everyone leaves. Summer decides to use time lapse camera footage of the History Wall project for her portfolio instead. However, she is devastated when Andrew tells her he deleted the video. Summer has trouble studying for her English exam and she decides to take pictures of her notes and look at them during the exam. Michael Williams catches her cheating and Summer begs him not to fail her. During the argument, Michael collapses and Summer calls an ambulance. She is relieved when he does not remember their fight.

Andrew admits he deleted the History Wall footage to protect his cousin, Kate Ramsay (Ashleigh Brewer), who was caught on the camera kissing a student. Summer forgives him and he encourages her to retake her exam. Summer gets the results she needs for university. Michael informs Summer that he has recalled what happened on the day he collapsed and gives her the chance to own up to cheating. Summer tells Priya Kapoor (Menik Gooneratne), the principal of Erinsborough High, about what she did and her place at university is revoked. Summer decides to repeat Year 12, but after being bullied on her first day back, she quits. Summer tries to persuade Paul to give her a job with the paper and when she increases sales through online content, Paul hires her. Summer and Andrew argue and decide to take a break from their relationship. Andrew tells Summer that he hates being on a break, but she refuses to end it. However, she realises that she has made a mistake and goes to talk to Andrew. Summer finds him kissing Belinda Ferry (Rachel Jessica Tan) and she ends their relationship.

Paul fires Summer, after she and Susan expose his sabotage of Natasha's party. However, Susan reinstates her when she becomes editor. Susan gives Summer an official warning after she allows another reporter to see the password to her email account. Summer begins dating Red Cotton's lead singer, Griffin O'Donahue (William Ewing), which causes problems between him and Andrew. Summer later discovers Griffin is seeing other girls and she breaks up with him. Susan gives Summer the task of writing the relationship advice column for the paper. She initially struggles with piece, but enlists Chris' help. Summer wins a journalism award and after a celebration dinner, she and Andrew have a one-night stand. Summer accuses Andrew of sending her mixed messages and she insults Natasha, when she thinks they have been flirting. Summer falls out with Chris when he accuses her of being self-absorbed. She realises that she has been selfish and apologises to Chris.

While they are on the way to a gig for Andrew's birthday, Summer and the other teens find Sophie Ramsay (Kaiya Jones) hiding in the boot of the car. Chris is persuaded into letting Sophie sit on Summer's lap. An argument breaks out between Andrew and Natasha, causing Chris to lose control of the car and crash. Summer crawls out of the wreckage uninjured, but suffering from shock. Karl becomes worried about Summer's behaviour and realises she has been traumatised by the crash. He helps her to express her feelings and encourages her to get in a car and drive it. Bradley Fox becomes the deputy editor of the Erinsborough News and Summer develops a crush on him. When he gives an idea she pitched to another journalist, Summer gets him into trouble with Susan, but later regrets her actions. Bradley agrees to mentor Summer at the paper and after they attend a quiz night at Charlie's together, they kiss. Summer and Bradley arrange a proper date and Susan voices her concerns about the age difference between them. Summer takes Bradley to the newspaper office to have sex, but they set the alarm off causing Susan to come down and sort it out. Summer hides under a desk to avoid her, but Susan later finds her belt and calls her in for a talk. Bradley is offered a job in Perth and Summer decides to go with him. She hands Susan her resignation and they fall out when Susan questions how much she knows about Bradley. Summer is devastated to learn that Bradley has left for Perth without her. She apologises to Susan, but decides not to take her job back. Summer then decides to apply for a scholarship in Paris and is later offered a place. Before she goes, Natasha tries to tell her that she and Andrew are together. However, Summer reveals that she already knows and is fine with it. She then says goodbye to her friends and leaves for Paris.

Ten years later, Summer returns to Erinsborough as part of a protest to keep Erinsborough High open. Susan is unaware of this until Summer informs her. Summer interviews former pupils of Erinsborough High for her Radio Podcast, including Steph's sister Michelle (Kate Keltie).

== Reception ==
While played by Siketa, a writer for the BBC said Summer's most notable moment was "Rescuing Ben." The actress earned two nominations for Best Young Actor at the Inside Soap Awards in 2004 and 2005 for her portrayal of Summer. Michael Idato of The Sydney Morning Herald branded Summer "precociously slappable". Following the character's recast, the Daily Record said "The last time we saw her, she was a cute little blonde-haired poppet. Now she's got a completely different head – and nobody on Ramsay Street seems to have noticed." TV Week writer Carolyn Stewart said that she is not normally a fan of recasts, but Summer's has been "great". Holy Soap describe Summer's most memorable moment as "When she burst back into Erinsborough looking for Steph, and was mistaken for a burglar". Anthony D. Langford from gay website, AfterElton said he liked Summer and found her role during Chris's coming out storyline "just as interesting as Chris's problems." Langford added "Her boyfriend coming out of the closet has clearly put her on the edge, and given her temper, once she unloads on Chris, it's not going to be pretty." In December 2010, a reporter for The Sun-Herald said the "romantic tension" between Summer and Andrew had been simmering for a while and they wondered if they would make their feelings known to each other in the season finale.

Jim Schembri of The Age was positive towards Summer and Andrew's relationship and he was surprised with the quality of the storyline's direction. He said "To wit: the romantic tension between hot-as teens Andrew (Jordan Smith) and Summer (Jordy Lucas) is so thick the cafe is now using it as a sandwich spread. They want to get it on with each other but while Andrew wants to start up again, Summer doesn't. They both reconsider their relationship prospects and come the big moment she's willing to give it a go. But before she can get a word out, he says he's reversed his policy and agrees with the advice he's been getting that it'd be a bad idea. It's a subtly played scene, with the standard of direction frankly outdoing what long-suffering film critics often see in Australian feature films." In March 2011, Holy Soap ran a poll on who Andrew should be with and 16,000 votes were cast, with 92% of viewers choosing Summer. Of Summer, Cameron Adams of the Herald Sun said "Wowsers. Reformed bad girl Summer (Jordy Lucas) has bloomed. Even as she struggles to get a journalism cadetship, she looks like a Hollywood starlet."
