= Sophie Ramsay =

Fictional character from the Australian soap opera Neighbours

- Neighbours character
- Portrayed by: Kaiya Jones
- Duration: 2009–2014
- First appearance: 18 May 2009
- Last appearance: 8 April 2014
- Introduced by: Susan Bower (2009); Richard Jasek (2014)
In-universe information
- Occupation: Student; Cleaner
- Family: Ramsay
- Father: Patrick Mooney
- Mother: Jill Ramsay
- Brothers: Harry Ramsay
- Sisters: Kate Ramsay
- Uncles: Paul Robinson
- Aunts: Lucy Robinson
- First cousins: Elle Robinson; Andrew Robinson

Sophie Ramsay is a fictional character from the Australian soap opera Neighbours, played by Kaiya Jones. The actress was cast in the role following a competitive audition process. Jones began filming her first scenes in February 2009. She made her first screen appearance during the episode broadcast on 18 May 2009. The character was created as part of a new generation of the Ramsay family, along with her brother Harry (Will Moore) and sister Kate (Ashleigh Brewer). Sophie is the youngest of three siblings introduced to the show. Sophie departed on 29 March 2013, after Jones decided to leave to concentrate on her schooling. The actress briefly reprised the role for two episodes on 7 and 8 April 2014.

== Creation and casting ==
In February 2009, a Channel 5 reporter announced Neighbours were introducing a new generation of the Ramsay family to the show. At the time of the casting announcement, the Ramsays had not appeared regularly in Neighbours since 2001. Executive producer Susan Bower said the introduction of the new Ramsay family members was based on the American drama series Party of Five. Bower explained "We have three orphans, basically. That, as you can imagine, has a tremendous amount of story material with it and they're fabulous! Wait until you see this cast. They just clicked". Bower introduced the new characters despite the show receiving criticism because they did not have a nuclear or "normal" family. Brisbane actress Ashleigh Brewer was cast as the eldest member of the new family, Kate, and Will Moore was cast as the only boy, Harry.

Kaiya Jones, a former cast member of The Saddle Club, was cast as Sophie, the youngest member of the Ramsay family, following a competitive audition process. Jones began filming her first scenes with Neighbours in February 2009. Jones was born and raised in Scotland and has lost her Scottish accent while living and filming in Australia. Of her casting, Jones told Samantha Booth of the Daily Record, "Filming Neighbours is so much fun. I just love my job and wouldn't want to be doing anything else. The cast and crew are so kind and lovely. They are practically my second family now. They're also very patient".

== Development ==
=== Characterisation and crush ===
Sophie was initially described as being the "baby of the family", who was trying to come to terms with the death of her mother, Jill (Perri Cummings). Channel 5 said Sophie was traumatised by Jill's death and she and her siblings had to fend for themselves. Sophie began communicating through drawings and revealed she knew more about her mother's death than anyone else. Sophie and her siblings soon settled into Number 24 and Sophie "found her feet", especially with the support of her friend, Callum Jones (Morgan Baker). Both Sophie and Callum bonded over mutual ground, as they were without their real parents. As she gets older, Sophie develops into a pretty, "free spirited" teenager.

Sophie develops feelings for neighbour and friend, Zeke Kinski (Matthew Werkmeister). Zeke finds out and he mistakenly tells his friends about her schoolgirl crush. Sophie is publicly humiliated and vows not to leave her house again. Zeke tries to make things better by going to visit her. A Neighbours insider told the Daily Star, "Sophie is humiliated and ends up running away to hide from everyone. Zeke feels terrible and is determined to help her."

=== Noah Parkin ===
In July 2011, Orpheus Pledger joined the cast as Noah Parkin. Pledger began filming his first scenes opposite Jones and many of Noah's early scenes were with Sophie. Channel 5 reported Noah would get close to one particular Erinsborough local and they should prepare for "heartbreak and havoc." Sophie and Noah connect as they are both really into music. When asked how Noah feels about Sophie, Pledger said "She's just a friend and another student who happens to be into the same thing. He just wants to help her." Noah agrees to help Sophie with her guitar lessons and she develops a crush on him. However, Sophie is unaware that Noah is attracted to her sister instead. Sophie is left heartbroken when she discovers Noah does not like her romantically and has a crush on someone else. Of the development, Susan Hill of the Daily Star explained "The pretty student has been dreaming about Noah and would love to be his girlfriend. So when she finds out he's in love with someone but he can't tell her who, she gets her hopes up." However, Sophie is devastated when she learns Noah has his eye on Summer Hoyland (Jordy Lucas). Sophie feels like she cannot compete against someone as attractive as Summer and she has a "pretty tough time of it." Sophie discovers Noah actually likes Kate and she is devastated. She decides to drop out of Noah's band. After Kate tells Noah to stay away from her and Sophie, he reveals their kiss to everyone. He later admits to lying to get her into trouble. However, Andrew Robinson (Jordan Patrick Smith) finds Sophie having a go at Noah for trying to ruin her sister's career and he tells her the kiss did happen. Sophie tells Priya Kapoor (Menik Gooneratne) that Noah was not lying and she falls out with Kate.

=== Makeover and Corey O'Donahue ===
In September 2011, the official Neighbours website reported Jones had decided to cut her waist length hair into a Bob cut. The website said the reason why Jones' character was sporting a new look would be revealed in the coming months. Jones explained Sophie's styling choices are "pretty extreme" compared to her own casual style and she added "I can't give too much away but her look is very radical, she's definitely discovered what eye-liner and mascara is all about." On 6 October, Channel 5 reported Sophie would undergo a radical rock chick makeover. They said "The transformation reflects Sophie's shift from demure school girl to would-be rock chick, and is key to a major storyline which sees her rebellious side start to emerge." News of Sophie's "drastic" makeover followed Jones' decision to have her hair styled into a bob to reflect the personality changes in her character.

Sophie moves in with her uncle, Paul Robinson (Stefan Dennis), following her falling out with Kate and more of her rebellious nature begins to come out. Jones told a writer for Inside Soap "Sophie wants to be independent. Now she's living with Paul, she thinks she can do what she wants because her sister, Kate, isn't looking over her shoulder all the time." Paul tells Sophie she is too young to attend a Red Cotton gig, which makes her more determined to go. She asks her cousin, Andrew, to help her out as he organised the gig. Jones said Sophie is manipulative and uses emotional blackmail to get what she wants. Andrew manages to persuade Paul into letting Sophie attend the gig, saying he will keep an eye on her. The storyline also saw the introduction of a new love interest for Sophie. Sophie meets and develops an attraction to Corey O'Donahue (Toby Wallace). Of Corey, Wallace said "He meets [Sophie] at one of his brother's gigs - they both click and she really likes him. But there's this wall between Sophie and Corey in that she doesn't really know who he is. She likes that mystery." Corey impresses Sophie and he gives her first kiss. Wallace said he and Jones found the scene awkward to shoot at first, but it became comfortable after a while. When Paul turns up at the gig, Andrew finds Sophie and Corey together and pulls them apart. He orders Sophie to stay away from Corey, but she refuses. Jones said "Sophie thinks of this guy as a great distraction. She threatens to tell Paul that she kissed Corey at the gig - and Andrew knows that his dad will be furious with him if he finds out..."

=== Departure and return ===
On 26 November 2012, Erin Miller from TV Week announced that Jones would be leaving Neighbours, along with two other cast members. Miller reported that Jones wanted to concentrate on her high school education. The actress filmed her final scenes in December. Jones commented that she was "both sad but excited" about her decision to leave. Executive producer Richard Jasek stated "All the characters departing will leave a legacy on Ramsay Street which is testament to the extraordinary talents of the actors playing them. Communities are constantly changing and Neighbours is reflective of this." Sophie departed on 29 March 2013.

On 10 February 2014, it was announced that Jones would be returning to Neighbours for a brief guest stint. The actress has already filmed her scenes for "a special celebration episode". Jones's return gave her the opportunity to catch up with Brewer, her on-screen sister, before she finished filming with the show. Jones later said that her return storyline was "really good" and added "It's challenging and an emotional rollercoaster, so that's been fun." Jones's return scenes as Sophie aired from 7 April 2014.

== Storylines ==
Sophie's mother, Jill, dies after a hit-and-run accident and she, her brother Harry and sister Kate are left to fend for themselves. Kate buys Sophie a bike and when she falls off and hurts her ankle, Kate realises that the family need help. The family then move into Ramsay Street. Sophie's uncle Paul Robinson becomes the prime suspect in Jill's death, but Rebecca Napier (Jane Hall) realises that Sophie witnessed her mother's accident. Sophie explains that Paul was helping Jill and Sophie thanks him. Sophie befriends Callum Jones and they bond over shared interests. Lou Carpenter (Tom Oliver) becomes the Ramsay's guardian. When the family is put at risk of being split up by the DHS, Harry tries to keep the situation a secret from Sophie. Sophie finds out and makes her siblings promise to tell her everything in future. Callum and Sophie begin attending Erinsborough High. While Callum strikes up a friendship with some other boys, Sophie is bullied. Callum start neglecting Sophie, but when she prevents his friends from embarrassing him in public, they become close friends again. Sophie applies to the National Basketball Academy on Harry's behalf and he is delighted when he gets in. He then leaves for Sydney.

Sophie, Kate and Lou invite Lucas Fitzgerald (Scott Major) to move in with them. Sophie develops a crush on Zeke Kinski and when she learns that he is on the school social committee, she joins up too. Callum teases her about her crush and they fall out. Natasha Williams (Valentina Novakovic) learns of Sophie's crush on Zeke and blackmails her into voting for the things she wants for the social. Zeke tries to let Sophie down gently, but he manages to upset her. Sophie asks Lisa Devine (Sophie Tilson) to give her make over, but when she is teased by Dean Harman (Cameron Heine), Summer Hoyland helps her to find something that she more feels comfortable in. Lyn Scully (Janet Andrewartha) allows Sophie to babysit her grandson Charlie Hoyland (Jacob Brito). While Sophie is on the phone, Charlie runs away. Lyn is initially angry with Sophie, but later apologises when Charlie is found. When Kate asks Sophie to leave town with her and her boyfriend, Mark (Scott McGregor), Sophie initially refuses to go. She eventually changes her mind and she and Kate race to meet Mark, but they find they are too late and he has left without them. Sophie begins learning to play the guitar and befriends new student, Noah Parkin, who helps her to learn the chords.

Kate pays Noah to give Sophie guitar lessons and Sophie organises a small gig at the Men's Shed for him to say thanks. Sophie swaps her guitar for a bass, so she can join Noah's band. While she is at music camp, she decides to cut her hair and change her image. When Sophie finds Noah's sketchbook is full of songs and sketches of Kate, she realises he has a crush on her sister and is devastated. Noah later reveals Kate kissed him and when Andrew confirms the allegation is true, Sophie tells acting principal, Priya Kapoor. Noah reveals that Kate was grieving for Mark when she kissed him. Sophie confronts her sister about keeping Mark's death from her and their relationship deteriorates. Sophie then decides to moves in with her uncle, Paul Robinson. Sophie helps her cousin, Andrew, organise a gig for local band Red Cotton. Sophie meets Corey O'Donahue during the gig and they kiss. Andrew sends Sophie home, but she starts blackmailing him into letting her see Corey. When Sophie decides to break up with Corey, Andrew asks her to keep dating him as he wants Corey's brother, the lead singer of Red Cotton, to let him manage the band. Kate leaves town without telling Sophie, which upsets her.

When Sophie comes to watch Andrew shoot a video for Red Cotton's first music video at the school, Corey's brother, Griffin (William Ewing) is unhappy. She apologises for hurting Corey and helps the band with the video. However, she gets carried away and wrecks a bathroom. Sophie then reveals that she thinks Kate left because of her, despite Paul reassuring her that that is not true. When Sophie refuses to apologise for wrecking the bathroom, Priya expels her. Roz Challis (Janet Watson Kruse) from the DHS hears of Sophie's expulsion and explains that Kate has seven days to return or Sophie will be placed in foster care. Paul leaves to find Kate, while Susan Kennedy (Jackie Woodburne) looks after Sophie, who later asks her to be her guardian. Believing Kate will not return, Sophie decides to run and she stays with Rani Kapoor (Coco Cherian). Rani and Callum try to encourage Sophie to return home and Callum eventually tells Paul where she is. Kate returns in time for the DHS meeting and she and Sophie admit they do not want to live together anymore. Paul successfully applies to become Sophie's guardian and she begins attending Eden Hills Grammar.

Sophie decides she wants to return to Erinsborough High and writes an apology to Priya. She also gets Red Cotton to perform at the school, but Priya tells her it is not enough. Kate later talks to Priya on her behalf and Priya allows Sophie to return. Sophie becomes jealous of Callum and Rani's friendship and tries to turn them against each other. Callum and Rani tell Sophie that they fancy each other and she becomes uncomfortable with their romantic behaviour. However, she then realises that they are faking it and Rani explains that they were just getting their revenge. Paul learns Sophie's grades are slipping and asks her to concentrate on her homework. He later becomes fed up of her attitude and forbids her from going to see The Jezabels in the city. When Sophie learns Andrew and his friends are going, she sneaks out and hides in the boot of Chris Pappas' (James Mason) car. When she is discovered, Andrew persuades Chris into letting her sit on Summer's lap. An argument breaks out between Andrew and Natasha, causing Chris to lose control of the car and crash. Sophie is thrown from the car and seriously injured. She undergoes surgery to repair her broken pelvis and to stop some internal bleeding. Her heart briefly stops, but is soon restarted.

Sophie begins feeling isolated in the hospital and she asks to go home, but Paul arranges for her to go to rehab in Sydney. Sophie returns a few weeks later, using crutches to help her walk. Sophie tells Chris that she blames herself for the crash and he tries to reassure her that it was not her fault. He also tells her not to shut her friends out. Sophie gives up music, but helps Chris to learn the guitar. She later learns that Chris could play all along and that he was helping her instead. Sophie gets herself a job at the local cafe, Grease Monkey's, which annoys Paul. He later employs her as a cleaner at Lassiter's Hotel instead. Sophie tells Kate and Paul that she has applied to the Sydney Conservatorium of Music. However, she is upset when she learns that her application was rejected and that Paul told the conservatorium about her exclusion from school. Sophie then successfully applies to the Newtown High School of the Performing Arts and manages to get Paul to sign the application form, by tricking him. When Paul finds out what Sophie has done, he threatens to ring the school and tell them. However, both Sophie and Kate talk him out of it. Sophie says goodbye to Callum and Rani and she leaves Ramsay Street, along with Andrew and Natasha. A year later, Sophie returns for Kate's birthday and is delighted when Kate gets engaged to Mark. Shortly afterwards, Kate is shot and she dies, devastating Sophie. After attending the funeral, Sophie goes to visit Harry in the United States during his basketball tour.

== Reception ==
Holy Soap said that Sophie's most memorable moment was witnessing the "crash that killed her mother" and communicating this through drawings in her journal, before coming forward to help Paul Robinson off the hook. Peter Dyke and Katie Begley of the Daily Star called Sophie a "pretty teen." A writer for the Herald Sun branded Sophie's crush on Zeke "creepy". When Sophie began to change her personality and appearance, Cameron Adams of The Advertiser said he knew Sophie had gone emo because she had her nose pierced. Adams added "Sophie's pierced herself for a boy, of course. Problem is, he's older. And a muso. So cue lots of pouting, jaw-dropping and "whatever" and "OMG" facial expressions. And then looking at him wistfully as they pretend to rock out." Adams later called Sophie "recalcitrant". The Herald Sun's Dianne Butler thought Sophie wore too much eye make-up.
