= Sunny Lee =

Fictional character from the Australian soap opera Neighbours

- Neighbours character
- Portrayed by: Hany Lee
- First appearance: 8 April 2009
- Last appearance: 19 November 2009
- Created by: Susan Bower
- Introduced by: Susan Bower
In-universe information
- Occupation: Student

Sunny Lee is a fictional character from the Australian soap opera Neighbours, played by Hany Lee. She made her first screen appearance during the episode broadcast on 8 April 2009. Sunny was created by executive producer Susan Bower in response to criticism that Neighbours was "too white". Lee came to the attention of Neighbours producers after she entered a competition run by Dolly Magazine to win a three-month contract with the show. Despite not winning, she was cast as Sunny soon afterwards. In August 2009, it was announced that Lee and Sunny would be departing Neighbours and Sunny made her final appearance on 19 November 2009.

Sunny was an exchange student from South Korea who is taken in by Karl (Alan Fletcher) and Susan Kennedy (Jackie Woodburne). Sunny was described as having "typical teenage insecurities", which made her appear abrasive, unfriendly and "snobby". Her storylines focused on her starting a relationship with Zeke Kinski (Matthew Werkmeister), having her first kiss stolen by Donna Freedman (Margot Robbie) and being the subject of a crush by Robin Hester (Benjamin Jay). During her time on Neighbours, Sunny was poorly received by television critics.

== Creation and casting ==
In July 2008, Neighbours was branded "too white" by black and Asian viewers in Britain. A report found that many ethnic viewers felt they were under-represented in some of Britain's most popular television shows. In Australia there was talk of a 'White Australia policy' when it came to casting actors for top-rated soaps. In response to the criticism, executive producer Susan Bower made the decision to add more ethnically diverse extras, small walk on roles and speaking parts. She also decided to introduce 15-year-old Korean actor Hany Lee into the cast as exchange student, Sunny Lee. Bower said "I know we're going to get flak about this gorgeous little Korean girl who's going to be coming in next year, because you're damned if you do and damned if you don't".

Hany Lee was chosen to play the role of Sunny after she was spotted at Dolly Magazine's "Neighbours' Next Big Stars" contest. Lee made it to the final ten, but ultimately lost out on the six-week contract to Mauricio Merino Jr. (Simon Freedman) and Chelsea Jones (Tegan Freedman). A few months later, Lee was cast as regular character Sunny after producers saw her audition tape for the competition.

In August 2009, it was announced that Lee was to leave the show. Producers confirmed that Lee would film her last scenes the following month and they would air in Australia that November. Following the news, Lee said that she would miss the friendships that she had formed with the actors and crew.

== Development ==
=== Characterisation ===
Sunny clashed with her culture's patriarchal society after being influenced by life in western countries and was considered to be something of a rebel by her peers. On her arrival into the show, Sunny was described as being aloof by television channel, Five's Holy Soap website. They also described her as being bright, confident, having an outspoken nature and being "full of contradictions". Holy Soap also described Sunny as having "typical teenage insecurities", which included being self-conscious about her braces and her lack of experience with boys. This results in Sunny having an abrasive attitude. British television magazine, What's on TV described Sunny as being initially "disappointed by the lack of excitement in Erinsborough", they also added "Sunny appears snobby and unfriendly. But Sunny's front is a cover for a whole host of insecurities".

On her character, Lee said "She's come from an Asian lifestyle and culture so she's out there, she's got the fashion going on, the hair and make up going on and the attitude". Lee also said that she shares some similarities with Sunny, with them both having strict parents. On her departure, Lee said that Sunny took a "sacrifice" in leaving as she did not want her parents turning up and ruining everyone's lives, especially after Susan had recently suffered health issues.

=== Relationships ===
Sunny found it difficult to express herself to the other female teens on her first day in Ramsay Street and instead she chose to talk to 'Lost Boy' from the radio station, Pirate Net about her past and her hurtful relationship with her sister.

Sunny and her housemate, Zeke Kinski, clashed on a number of occasions, which led What's on TV to ask "is their playful animosity fuelled by romantic chemistry?" Viewers saw Sunny finding herself unable to deal with her feelings for Zeke and their friends trying to encourage the two to begin a relationship. Zeke managed to get Sunny to open up to him about her insecurities and she started to trust him. They later began a relationship. Holy Soap described their relationship saying "After much to-ing and fro-ing, she eventually got together with Zeke". Network Ten describe Sunny and Zeke's relationship as being a "blessing in Zeke's life, and a great help to him". Sunny is also credited with helping Zeke to heal from his past and putting him on the straight and narrow again. Bower called Zeke and Sunny the show's "Romeo and Juliet couple". Of their relationship she said "They come from different cultures and she's got a year as an exchange student, so we play out the Romeo and Juliet thing. How far do they go for their love? Do they love each other? They keep clashing because of their cultural differences".

Robin Hester played by Benjamin Jay, was a teenager who formed a crush on Sunny and tried to ruin her relationship with Zeke. Digital Spy said Robin "goes to drastic lengths to keep Zeke and Sunny apart" and Holy Soap and Jay labelled him as "creepy". Robin was seen trying to manipulate Sunny and he locked Zeke in a store cupboard, so he could spend time with her. Lee named the storyline with Robin as her favourite from her time in the show. She said "That was probably the best storyline ever because it gave me a chance to show who Sunny Lee was".

=== Same-sex kiss ===
One of Sunny's most high-profile storylines was a kiss between herself and female character, Donna Freedman (Margot Robbie). The kiss occurs after Donna discovers that Sunny has been writing the romantic love letters given to her by her boyfriend. Sunny is then shocked when Donna leans over and kisses her on the lips and steals her first kiss. Lee said "For days, all Sunny's been able to think about is what it would be like to kiss Zeke. Now Donna's gone and stolen the moment – and Sunny's not happy, to say the least..."

Previously a kiss between Lana Crawford (Bridget Neval) and Sky Mangel (Stephanie McIntosh) in 2004 received complaints from conservative groups. The show's producers called the kiss between Sunny and Donna "impulsive" and Robbie agreed, saying "It's really not a big deal at all. It's not an actual gay storyline, it's just kind of an impulsive peck". The storyline came weeks after rival soap Home and Away endured a backlash to its own same-sex romance.

The storyline received attention from the Australian Family Association, with spokesman John Morrissey saying that he was concerned about TV "normalising" same-sex relationships. Psychologist Dr Janet Hall praised the storyline, saying it allows families to discuss the topic. Susan Bower defended the kiss, which was shot before the Home and Away controversy, saying "Ours is a lovely tale about friendship. It's very innocent." She added "If we were going to do a lesbian story – and "Neighbours" is not against lesbian stories – we would do it properly. This is a teenage romance story. There's nothing sexual".

== Storylines ==
Susan and Karl Kennedy decide to take in exchange student, Sunny, following their step daughter's departure. On her first night with the Kennedys, Sunny calls into the Pirate Net radio station and speaks to 'Lost Boy' about her past and her relationship with her sister. Sunny believes that she has humiliated herself by talking too much about her life. She then decides to find out who 'Lost Boy' is, so she can confront him. She is unaware that he is really her housemate, Zeke Kinski.

During auditions for the school play, a romantic tension builds between Sunny and Zeke and they are asked to play the lead roles. Sunny quits the play when she realises that she has to kiss Zeke. Sunny then finds out that Zeke is 'Lost Boy', but she forgives him. When she sees Donna Freedman practising the kissing scene with Zeke, Sunny becomes upset. Sunny and Zeke almost share a kiss one night when they are alone. However, they are interrupted by Libby Kennedy (Kym Valentine). Due to rewrites of the play, Sunny's new character has to kiss Zeke too and Sunny grows uncomfortable again. During drama camp, Sunny and Zeke are locked in a cupboard during a game of truth or dare. They almost kiss again, but are interrupted when the door is opened. Karl realises that Sunny and Zeke like each other and he tries to keep them apart. However, they eventually start a relationship.

Sunny offers to help out Ringo Brown (Sam Clark) with his love letters to Donna. When Donna works out that Ringo did not write the letters, Sunny has to tell her that she wrote them for him. In a spur-of-the-moment act, Donna kisses Sunny, grateful for her honesty. Sunny is upset that her first kiss was stolen by Donna. Sunny and Zeke's first kiss occurs during the play. Sunny struggles with public displays of affection with Zeke and she lies that she told her parents about their relationship. When Sunny finds that her grades have slipped, she decides to end the relationship and admits to Zeke that she did not tell her parents about him.

At a music festival, Sunny is embarrassed when Ringo and Declan Napier (James Sorensen) interrupt a kiss between her and Zeke. She runs off into the bush, falls down a cliff and injures her ankle. Zeke also falls down the cliff, they are eventually rescued by Declan and Lucas Fitzgerald (Scott Major). Karl and Susan call Sunny's parents and learn that they know nothing about the festival or Zeke. Sunny's parents demand that she is placed on the next flight home. However, Zeke moves out, so Sunny's parents will not worry about them having a relationship. Zeke later moves back home and Karl asks Sunny to call her father and translate for him. Sunny lies to her father about the nature of the conversation and tells him that her father said everything is fine.

After hearing Sunny on the radio, Robin Hester turns up in Ramsay Street to try to get close to her. Sunny believes he is just being friendly. Robin climbs through Sunny's bedroom window and takes a photo of her. He locks Zeke in Pirate Net's storeroom, so he can spend some time with Sunny alone. Sunny and Robin go to Pirate Net to see if Zeke is there and Robin pretends to find the storeroom key and unlocks the door. Zeke tells Sunny that Robin locked him in the storeroom, but she refuses to believe him. Zeke violently attacks Robin in front of Sunny, scaring her. Zeke apologises and Sunny eventually realises that Zeke had been right about Robin. Sunny meets Robin at Charlie's and tells him that she and Zeke have broken up. Robin confesses to locking Zeke in the storeroom and tries to kiss Sunny, but Zeke appears and tells Robin to stay away them.

Libby accuses Zeke of writing Kyle Canning's (Christopher Milligan) essay for him, but Sunny reveals that she wrote it. Kyle was blackmailing her after he overheard Sunny telling Donna that her parents did not know about Zeke moving home. Karl and Susan make Sunny call her parents and tell them about Zeke. Sunny tells them that her parents want her to come home. Zeke tells Sunny that he will go to South Korea with her. However, when Sunny realises how much Susan and Karl need him, she tells him to stay. On her last day, Zeke organises a picnic and a performance at Charlie's from The Black Skirts. A few days after her departure, Sunny texts Zeke and tells him not to contact her again.

== Reception ==
Sunny was negatively received during her time on Neighbours. Upon her arrival, a Western Mail reporter believed that viewers were going to tire of Sunny "quite quickly" and that she was "downright irritating." A critic for the Daily Record quipped that "She makes an impression – sadly, not a good one. Instead, she rubs everyone up the wrong way, including the usually chirpy Donna." The critic later bemoaned the slow build-up to romance between Sunny and Zeke, stating "Despite being in such close proximity, the pair fail to declare their feelings for each other. Here's hoping they do eventually get on with it, because it's turning into one of the longest will-they, won't they storylines ever."

Ruth Deller of entertainment website Lowculture called the character "annoying" and thought that she had "no other layers to her personality". She added "As for expecting us to believe that perma-mardy emo kid Zeke would fall for her? Don't be daft – he's the character most likely to push her from a tower. Let's hope her stay in Ramsay Street is short-lived." In November, Deller called the storyline between Sunny, Zeke and Robin "ludicrous" and she was placed at number one of the "soap characters we love to hate" list. Deller cited her "continued presence in general" as another reason for her being there.

During a feature on the best and worst soap characters of the decade, Sunny was placed at number eight on the worst soap characters list. Deller stated "Neighbours doesn't have a great reputation for ethnic diversity, and when they finally decide to introduce a non-white main character for the first time in years, they have to make her the most wooden, annoying, drippy character since Ned. Let's hope Sunny's failure isn't an excuse for avoiding ethnic minority casting in the future…"
