= Harry Ramsay =

Fictional character

- Neighbours character
- Portrayed by: Will Moore
- Duration: 2009–2010
- First appearance: 18 May 2009
- Last appearance: 11 June 2010
- Introduced by: Susan Bower
In-universe information
- Occupation: Student at Erinsborough High; Basketball player
- Family: Ramsay
- Father: Patrick Mooney
- Mother: Jill Ramsay
- Sisters: Kate Ramsay; Sophie Ramsay
- Uncles: Paul Robinson
- First cousins: Elle Robinson; Andrew Robinson

Harry Ramsay is a fictional character from the Australian television soap opera Neighbours, played by Will Moore. He made his first appearance on 18 May 2009, along with his sisters Kate Ramsay (Ashleigh Brewer) and Sophie Ramsay (Kaiya Jones). The siblings were introduced as a new generation of the Ramsay family, with their storyline inspired by the American drama series Party of Five. Harry is portrayed as having a unique persona, being a loner refusing to accept help from others and rebelling against those around him. He is sensitive, reserved and just wants to fit in. The character is shown to be close with his older sister Kate. He is also an accomplished musician and talented basketball player.

Harry's early storylines focused on how he and his sisters coped with being orphaned, following the death of their mother, and their involvement with the Department of Human Services. Moore hoped his character would get a romance plot, as he was isolated with his sisters, but Harry is not popular with the girls of his age. He is inexperienced and nerves affect him when he is around girls he likes. At one point, Harry competes with his cousin Andrew Robinson (Jordan Patrick Smith) for Summer Hoyland (Jordy Lucas). Lucas felt that Harry and Summer were well matched and had plenty in common, but Summer almost sees Harry as a brother and they do not have a lot of chemistry. Moore decided not to renew his one-year contract with the show and his character's exit aired on 11 June 2010. Moore revealed that some viewers became angry at some of the things Harry did during his time on the show.

== Creation and casting ==
In February 2009, it was announced that Neighbours producers were introducing a new generation of the Ramsay family to the show, more than a decade after the family had last appeared. Executive producer Susan Bower said the introduction of the new characters was based on the American drama series Party of Five. She added "We have three orphans, basically. That, as you can imagine, has a tremendous amount of story material with it and they're fabulous! Wait until you see this cast. They just clicked". Bower introduced the new characters despite the show receiving criticism because they did not have a nuclear or a "normal" family. Bower said that where she lives, in the suburbs, "there's not a lot of your mum, dad and two kids". Actress Ashleigh Brewer was cast as older sister Kate Ramsay. It was after this Will Moore was cast as Harry, and Kaiya Jones was cast as Sophie Ramsay, completing the family unit. Speaking of his character being part of the Ramsay family Moore said "At first I thought "Oh my God, am I supposed to do something special?" Everyone said "Your character's Harry Ramsay? Like Ramsay Street?" So I have those connections, but I got used to playing it after a while. It's pretty cool to be playing a part that has so much history and it's cool that we're related to so many of the original characters – Anne Robinson and Max Ramsay had an affair and had our mum."

== Development ==
Harry has been described as a loner, an outcast and unlucky in love. Speaking of his character during an interview with Last Broadcast, Moore said "Harry is a confused teenager trying to figure out who he is. He's a bit of a loner and doesn't have too many friends. He puts up a facade of confidence and toughness, but really underneath he is a sensitive dork. All he really wants is to be accepted and fit in, but nothing seems to work for him. He also finds it hard to score with girls." Moore has also compared the character to himself commenting that he is a rebel.

During an interview with Channel Five's soap opera reporting site, Holy Soap, Moore revealed an insight into his character and how his storylines have had a direct effect on his personality stating:

Harry is a bit more reserved and less mischievous. Harry does a lot more things that are illegal – like graffiti – but as far as general conversation goes, Harry is quite a nervous guy. But he'll come out of his shell soon. He gets some confidence. A new side of Harry comes out which is more interesting. But obviously he is getting over a lot of torment, the fact he's lost his mother and is stirring up the DHS. Eventually he gets over all that and accepts what's happened to him, and starts to get his life back on track.

Network Ten state on the series official website that Harry only has a close relationship with Kate. They call him a "shrewd judge of character" and he makes "whip-like observations" of everything. He has a "reflective soul." Also describing him as an accomplished musician who meditates with music. Harry feels like he needs no one in his life but his sisters, playing a loner. He masks who he really is, a laid back character that tests everyone he meets fearing he cannot trust them, making harsh observations. They add he is hard to shock and likes children for their honesty and lack of guile which he applies to himself. They also state that due to his complex personality that other people think he is "aloof" and "withdrawn".

Harry has never been popular with the female characters featured in Neighbours, often messing up any chance of a relationship due to his bad nerves around girls other than his sisters. He also finds it hard to bond with other girls as he masks his true identity whilst making his harsh observations he applies to other characters. Moore said he felt bad for Harry and that it was time for him to find some love. He said "Harry's been a bit isolated just having his sisters. Unfortunately you're not going to see any romance with Harry at all. The character hasn't been kissed before, which is quite incredible. He hasn't really been with a girl before so it's a very nerve-wracking experience for him and he kind of screws those opportunities up."

Harry competes with his cousin Andrew Robinson (Jordan Patrick Smith) for the affections of Summer Hoyland (Jordy Lucas). Comparing the two characters, Lucas said that Harry was more "straight-down-the-line and trustworthy than Andrew." She thought that he and Summer share the same values and that he would never hurt or cheat on her. Lucas felt that Summer could be herself around Harry and talk seriously with him, especially about the loss of their mother's. Lucas also said "On paper, Harry is everything Summer should go for – they even have a love of music in common." However, Lucas also explained her character is more attracted to Andrew and almost sees Harry as a brother, and because they are so similar, the chemistry between them is lacking. She also pointed out that Harry is also an introvert, which is hard for Summer as she likes to talk about how she feels and finds it hard when he shuts down.

In March 2010, it was announced that Moore was to leave Neighbours after deciding not to renew his contract. His character's exit scenes aired on 11 June, as Harry says goodbye to his sisters and departs for a Basketball scholarship in Sydney. Bower was aware that viewers would be disappointed that one of the "Young Ramsays" was leaving the show so soon after their introduction. She stated: "We were very saddened, too, because we fell in love with Harry, but Will had a one-year contract and he decided he didn't want to continue. I believe he's furthering his school studies." Bower also explained that there were no plans to recast the role, because the character of Declan Napier had just been through a recast. She added that there were no plans to introduce further Ramsay/Robinson children for the moment, but that one of the male characters in the show would take Harry's place in the Ramsay house.

== Storylines ==
Harry arrives in Erinsborough with his sisters following the death of their mother Jill Ramsay (Perri Cummings). Harry is the middle child and the only Ramsay boy, he is particularly close to Kate as she has been a mother figure to him. Harry has had to deal with a great deal already in his life and as a result he does not let others in easily. He is devoted to his two sisters and will do anything to ensure their safety and happiness.

Despite finding out that Paul Robinson (Stefan Dennis) is not responsible for the death of his mother, Harry still blames Paul for taking her away from him. On his first day at Erinsborough High, Harry meets Declan Napier (James Sorensen) and Bridget Parker (Eloise Mignon) and he is unaware of Declan's connection to Paul. At the opening night of the school play, Kyle Canning (Chris Milligan) tells Harry that Declan's mother Rebecca Napier (Jane Hall) is Paul's girlfriend. Harry fights with Declan, which Dan Fitzgerald (Brett Tucker) interrupts. While helping out Bridget behind the scenes he finds out she and Declan are a couple and asks her how Rebecca can stand by Paul. Declan appears and another fight breaks out between them, in which Harry is pushed off the stage. While Dan is telling them off, yet another fight breaks out between them. They fall into a man holding a rope connected to some scenery, which crashes down on top of a pregnant Bridget. Harry goes to the hospital to see if Bridget and her baby are okay. Dan then gives Harry and Declan weekend detention. Harry eventually forgives Paul and no longer blames him for his mother's death. During a jumble sale that Susan Kennedy (Jackie Woodburne) is holding, Harry sees a keyboard that he wants. He cannot afford to buy it, but when it goes unsold, he breaks into the Kennedys' home to play it. When Susan discovers that Harry was the person who had broken into her home, she asks him to play for her. During his time with Susan, Harry breaks down and cries when he plays Moonlight Sonata as it was his mother's favourite piece.

After Stephanie Scully (Carla Bonner) is blamed for the death of Bridget, Harry spray paints "Guilty" on her driveway. He is caught by an angry Toadfish Rebecchi (Ryan Moloney) who says he is going to the police, but Harry begs him not to. Toadie makes him apologise to Steph and work for her doing jobs around the house. At first he is sullen and rude to Steph, but when he realises how upset she was about the accident they reconcile.

In the build up to the Deb Ball, Harry is manipulated into buying alcohol by Amanda Fowler (Bella Heathcote). After smuggling the alcohol into the school and hiding it in a locker, it is discovered by Dan. Harry tries to pin the blame on Declan, but he later admits that the bottle was his and he is suspended from Erinsborough High. As a result, Roz Challis (Janet Watson Kruse) from the DHS is forced to intervene with the Ramsay family's living arrangements and she rules that Harry is failing to adapt to his new life style and he is taken into foster care. Lou Carpenter (Tom Oliver) offers to become the legal guardian of the Ramsays, and Paul and Toadie help to improve Lou's image and financial situation. While he is in care, Harry is bullied and beaten by a boy at his foster home. When Lou discovers this, he makes Harry come back to Ramsay Street and is almost arrested for kidnapping Harry. Roz assures Lou that the situation has been sorted and Harry returns to his foster home. The DHS eventually agree to Lou becoming the Ramsay's guardian and when the paperwork comes through, Harry is allowed to return home. Lou moves in with the family shortly afterwards.

Harry displays a natural talent for basketball and his cousin Andrew Robinson (Jordan Patrick Smith) encourages his ambition to play for the school team. Scott Griffin (Eamonn George), a school bully who is jealous of Harry's talent, tries to stop Harry from attending tryouts by intimidating and threatening him. Harry, with the support of his family, Andrew and Summer Hoyland (Jordy Lucas) decides to ignore Griffo and successfully tries out for team. Harry and Andrew compete to win Summer's affection and, after helping Summer out with her grandmother's love life, Harry and Summer share a kiss. However, Natasha Williams (Valentina Novakovic) tells Summer about Harry and Andrew's competition. Summer later tells Harry and Andrew that she does not want to be friends with them for them treating her like an object. Harry and Andrew work together to regain Summer's friendship and she eventually forgives them. But when she gets into a fight with Natasha over her interfering with her friends, she realises how the boys have turned her into someone she does not want to be and tells them she cannot be their friend anymore. Harry grows jealous when he finds out that Summer is dating Chris Pappas (James Mason), but he eventually makes up with Summer. Sophie applies to the National Basketball Academy on Harry's behalf, as she knows he will not do it himself. Harry is then chosen to try out in front of Andrew Gaze. Harry is accepted into the academy and he struggles to tell Kate that he is going to be leaving for Sydney. Harry changes his mind about going after listening to Andrew, but Kate helps him out and convinces him that he has the courage to go. Harry then leaves for Sydney after saying goodbye to his friends and family.

== Reception ==
The character of Harry has previously proved to outrage some viewers. Moore revealed that people had been angry at some of the stuff Harry had done. Moore said "They say 'How can you do this? You're such a horrible person.' I'm like 'Sorry.' Some people come up to me and say 'Did your mum really die?' And I'm like 'It's fictional!'". Cameron Adams of the Herald Sun branded the character "perpetually sad Harry". Commenting on Harry's misfortune with romance, a critic for the Sunday Mail quipped "Harry may be a lovable soul but when it comes to attracting girls, he's a bit naive. He's still worshipping Summer from afar, although his relationship with Renee fizzles out when she decides there's no spark between them."
