= Amanda Fowler =

Amanda Fowler may refer to:

- Amanda Reid (formerly Fowler; born 1996), Australian Paralympian
- Amanda Fowler (Neighbours), a character from the Australian soap opera Neighbours
