= Scott Brennan (comedian) =

Australian actor and comedian

- Born: Australia
- Occupations: Comedian, actor, voice-over artist, producer
- Years active: 1987–present

Scott Brennan is an Australian actor and comedian. He is best known for his work on the Australian television program skitHOUSE.

== Early life and education ==
Scott Brennan was born in Australia.

In 1990, he went to University of Melbourne to complete a B.Ed.

== Career ==
=== Live ===
Brennan has been a regular performer at the Melbourne International Comedy Festival since 1999. Past shows include Spontaneous Broadway, Life - Get it up ya (which was also performed at the Edinburgh Fringe), Code Beige, Glen Bush; Teenage Superstar (for which he received a Moosehead grant) and Very Very Scary.

He is or was a member of the cult comedy trio "Granny Bingo", who performed monthly sellout shows, as well as touring festivals. In 2017, their Melbourne Comedy Festival show A visit with Nan in a caravan won the Golden Gibbo Award.

=== Television ===
In 2006, he joined the cast of the popular late-night sketch comedy show Comedy Inc - The Late Shift, airing in Australia on the Nine Network. He also appeared on Foxtel's comedy show Stand Up Australia, where he performed a comedy routine on the fact that he is gay. In 2006 he also appeared as Dylan in the gay-science-fiction-fan-club short comedy film Outland. His other television credits include The Edge of the Bush, Upper Middle Bogan, Lowdown (Series 1 and 2), Judith Lucy's Spiritual Journey, Bogan Pride, Spicks and Specks, Rove Live, The Secret Life of Us, Blue Heelers, Stingers, and Welcher & Welcher.

He has also written for numerous television shows, including Prank Patrol (ABC) and The Project (Network Ten).

From July 2009, he appeared in the Australian soap opera Neighbours as Josh Burns, a local newspaper paper editor.

Through Mashup Pictures, he has written, directed, and produced a number of projects. He co-produced series 1 and 2 of Housemates - a documentary series for ABC.

He also wrote and directed Horror Housemates, a short-form series for ABC iview. He also created What could go wrong?, a comedy/doco series for ABC iview. During the lead up to the Australian marriage equality postal vote, he created a series of Sock Puppet Amateur Musicals on the debate. Other project with the company include the short documentary Life and Death in Vientiane and Busker Stories. He regularly appears as a podcaster on Talking Poofy.

=== Other activities ===
He has spent many years acting as a mentor and director for young comedians through the Comedy Festival's "LolSquad" program.

Brennan is also an active voice over artist, appearing in commercials for Hungry Jack's and Coles Supermarkets.

== Personal life ==
He is a fan of David Bowie.
