= Clint Bizzell =

Australian rules footballer

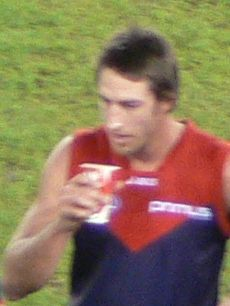

Personal information
- Full name: Clinton Bizzell
- Born: 28 June 1976 (age 50); Brisbane, Queensland
- Original team: Kedron Grange (QAFL)
- Draft: 75th, 1995 National Draft
- Debut: Round 6, 1996, Geelong vs. Melbourne, at the MCG
- Height: 188 cm (6 ft 2 in)
- Weight: 88 kg (194 lb)

Playing career^{1}
Years	Club	Games (Goals)
1996–2001	Geelong	75 (72)
2002–2007	Melbourne	88 (7)
Total		163 (79)
- ^{1} Playing statistics correct to the end of 2007.

Career highlights
- International Rules Series 2003

Clinton Bizzell (born 28 June 1976) is a former professional Australian rules footballer in the Australian Football League.

== Early life ==
The son of Robin Bizzell a QAFL player who played over 200 games, Clint was born in and grew up in Brisbane, Queensland and attended Payne Road Primary School, then attended Brisbane Boys' College. He was soon identified by talent scouts.

== AFL career ==
Bizzell began his professional football career at the Geelong Football Club after being taken at #74 overall in the 1995 AFL draft. During his stint at Geelong, Bizzell usually played in the forward line and by many accounts, was regarded as a "reasonable" player with some signs of potential, especially in the weeks following his 5 goals against Collingwood in 2001. However, that potential would not be realised at Geelong. At the end of the 2001 season, he was traded to the Melbourne Football Club.

At the Demons, Bizzell quickly rose to become a first class and reliable defender, who was capable of playing forward if the need arose. Throughout the 2003 and 2004 seasons, commentators began to recognise Bizzell as a strong playmaker off the back-half and a genuine talent in the AFL.In 2004 Bizzell was involved in a mini documentary where he explained the game of AFL to actor Matt Damon, Damon was also presented with a Melbourne Demons jumper. In 2005, he played 20 games for the season, including his 150th. However, a back injury resulted from a knock he sustained in a preseason match in 2006 and shortly after, he sustained a leg fracture which ultimately impeded his ability regain the senior-level match fitness before the end of the season. While he played a number of solid games for the Demons' VFL affiliate Sandringham when he recovered from injury, he was unable to break into the senior side due to a number of factors, including the fact that Bizzell was competing for a spot against some young emerging talent, most of whom began earning regular senior selection in 2006.

Unfortunately, he did not play a senior AFL game in 2006.

Breaking back into the side in round 8 in 2007, Bizzell produced a string of performances which guaranteed his re-selection, including a near best-on-ground performance against the Kangaroos, despite Melbourne losing by a solitary point.

Bizzell retired at the end of 2007.

== Post AFL ==
Following his retirement from the AFL, Bizzell pursued an acting career. He obtained a five-week guest role as Adam Clarke in the Australian soap opera Neighbours.

Along with his partner, former Channel 7 news presenter Jennifer Adams, Bizzell produces and hosts a TV travel series, Places We Go, which is broadcast on Network Ten. They have also written a book, Australia’s Top 100 Places To Go – The Ultimate Bucket List.

In 2023, Bizzell was diagnosed with prostate cancer.
