= Real time (media) =

Theatrical genre

Real time within a narrative is a method in which events are portrayed at the same rate at which they occur in the plot. For example, if a film told in real time is two hours long, then the plot of that movie covers two hours of fictional time. If a daily real time comic strip runs for six years, then the characters will be six years older at the end of the strip than they were at the beginning. This technique can be enforced with varying levels of precision. In some stories, every minute of screen time is a minute of fictional time. In other stories, such as the daily comic strip For Better or For Worse, each day's strip does not necessarily correspond to a new day of fictional time, but each year of the strip does correspond to one year of fictional time.

Real time fiction dates back to the climactic structure of classical Greek drama.

== Film, television and radio ==
Often, use of split screens or picture-in-pictures are used to show events occurring at the same time, or the context in which various subplots are affecting each other. Examples include the television series 24 and films Timecode and Phone Booth. On-screen clocks are often used to remind the audience of the real time presentation.

- The Passion of Joan of Arc (1928)
- Blackmail (1929)
- Night Flight (1933)
- The Petrified Forest (1936)
- Craig's Wife (1936)
- Odd Man Out (1947)
- Rope (1948)
- Sorry, Wrong Number (1948)
- The Set-Up (1949)
- Harriet Craig (1950)
- The Archers (Radio drama, 1951-)
- Detective Story (1951)
- High Noon (1952)
- 12 Angry Men (1957)
- Touch of Evil (1958)
- Cléo from 5 to 7 (1962)
- The Sadist (1963)
- It's a Mad, Mad, Mad, Mad World (1963)
- Fail Safe (1964)
- Rabid Dogs (1974)
- Inserts (1975)
- M*A*S*H; episode "Life Time" (1979)
- My Dinner with Andre (1981)
- Clue (1985)
- Seinfeld; episode "The Chinese Restaurant" (1991)
- Judgment Night (1993)
- Frasier; episodes "My Coffee with Niles" (1994) and "Dinner Party" (1999)
- Nick of Time (1995)
- Mad About You; episodes "Our Fifteen Minutes" (1995) and "The Conversation" (1997)
- Friends; episode "The One Where No One's Ready" (1996)
- 12 Angry Men (1997)
- Running Time (1997)
- Run Lola Run (1998)
- Rear Window (1998)
- The X-Files; episode "Triangle" (1998)
- The Royle Family (sitcom, 1998–2000)
- Space Ghost Coast to Coast; episode "Waiting for Edward" (1998)
- Timecode (2000)
- 24 (TV series, 2001–2010)
- 24: Redemption (Movie, 2008)
- 24: Live Another Day (TV miniseries, 2014)
- 24: Legacy (TV spin-off, 2017)
- Tape (2001)
- 30 Minute Meals (TV series, 2001–2012, 2019-)
- Russian Ark (2002)
- South Park; episode "The New Terrance and Phillip Movie Trailer" (2002)
- Buffy the Vampire Slayer; episode "Conversations with Dead People" (2002)
- Watching Ellie (TV series, 2002–03, first incarnation only)
- 11:14 (2003)
- Phone Booth (2003)
- Justice League; episode "Wild Cards" (2003)
- Before Sunset (2004)
- Blue Heelers; episode "Reasonable Doubts" (2004), the episode was both set in real time and aired live
- Stargate Atlantis; episode "Thirty-Eight Minutes" (2004)
- Nine Lives (2005)
- The Death of Mr. Lazarescu (2005)
- The President's Last Bang (2005)
- United 93 (2006)
- 16 Blocks (2006)
- Crank (2006)
- Numb3rs; episode "One Hour" (2007)
- The Simpsons; episode "24 Minutes" (2007)
- Doctor Who; episode "42" (2007)
- 88 Minutes (2008)
- Real Time (2008)
- Still Walking (2008)
- Exam (2009)
- Cabin Pressure; episode "Limerick" (Radio, 2009)
- Roger & Val Have Just Got In (TV series, 2010–2012)
- Him and Her (TV series, 2010–2013)
- Buried (2010)
- Cherry Tree Lane (2010)
- Silent House (2011)
- Neighbours; episode "Episode 6188" (2011)
- Carnage (2011)
- Logistics (2012)
- Gravity (2013)
- Locke (2013)
- Cyberbully (2015)
- Archer; episode "Vision Quest" (2015)
- Victoria (2015)
- Modern Family; episode "Connection Lost" (2015)
- Unfriended (2015)
- Money Monster (2016)
- Paris 05:59: Théo & Hugo (2016)
- U – July 22 (2018)
- The Guilty (2018)
- Brooklyn Nine-Nine; episode "Ticking Clocks" (2019)
- The Vast of Night (2019)
- Bluey; episode "Handstand" (2020)
- Shiva Baby (2020)
- Boiling Point (2021)
- Mass (2021)
- The Bear; episode "Review" (2022)
- Brooklyn 45 (2023)
- Daddio (2023)
- Soft & Quiet (2023)
- Saturday Night (2024)
- Nightsleeper (2024)
- Adolescence (2025)
- The Pitt (2025)
- The Invite (2026)

== Video games ==
In a real time computer game or simulation, events in the game occur at the same rate as the events which are being depicted. For instance, in a real time combat game, in one hour of play the game depicts one hour of combat.

- Microsoft Flight Simulator (series, 1982–)
- Prince of Persia (1989)
- Night Trap (1992)
- Double Switch (1993)
- Titanic: Adventure Out of Time (1996)
- The Last Express (1997)
- Seaman (1999)
- Animal Crossing (series, 2001–)
- Dungeon Siege (2002)
- Nintendogs (series, 2005–)
- 24: The Game (2006)
- Elite Dangerous (2014)
- God of War (2018)
- The Longing (2020)

== Comic books and strips ==
In comic books, the use of real time is made more complicated by the fact that most serial comics are released on a monthly basis and are traditionally 20 to 30 pages long, making it difficult to tell a story set in real time without overlooking important events from one month to the next. Another explanation is the prevalence of the superhero genre in American comics, and the iconic status attached to such characters; it is often considered that such mythological, sometimes godlike heroes cannot age in real time without losing the characteristics that make them special. This has led to the common use of floating timelines in the universes of Marvel Comics and DC Comics.

== Novels ==
In the Inspector Rebus series of detective novels by Scottish writer Ian Rankin, characters age in step with the publication date. Rebus is stated to have been born in 1947; in the 2007 novel Exit Music he reached age 60 and retired.
