= Matthew Werkmeister =

Australian actor (born 1992)

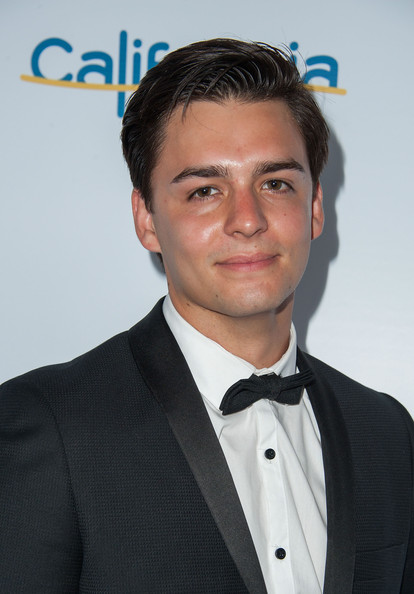
- Matthew Werkmeister at the Heath Ledger scholarship gala. LA
- Born: 30 January 1992 (age 34); Noble Park, Melbourne, Australia
- Education: St Peter's college
- Occupation: Actor
- Years active: 2005–present
- Known for: Neighbours (TV series) as Zeke Kinski

Matthew Werkmeister (born 30 January 1992) is an Australian stage and television actor. He is best known for his role as Zeke Kinski in the soap opera Neighbours from 2005 to 2011 and 2014.

== Career ==
Werkmeister began his career with the Children's Performing Company of Australia. He is represented by Storm Actors.

Prior to appearing in Neighbours, Werkmeister appeared in a stage production of The Full Monty. It was for this portrayal that he was nominated in 2005 for a Music Theatre Guild of Victoria: Awards for Excellence award in the category of Junior Performer (Male). The award was won by Daniel Todd for the stage production of Kiss Me Kate.

It was whilst he was appearing in The Full Monty that Werkmeister landed the role of Zeke Kinski in the Australian soap opera Neighbours. He almost missed out on the role when his father took the call about the audition and refused it because it was a five-hour drive to there. Werkmeister has said that he was "horrified" when he found out and called his agent back to find out if he could still attend the audition. He joined the cast in 2005 initially in a recurring role before becoming a regular cast member. His portrayal of Zeke Kinski led to a nomination in 2008 for Best Young Actor at the Inside Soap awards alongside fellow cast member Fletcher O'Leary (Mickey Gannon). During his time on Neighbours, Werkmeister met British singer Lily Allen when she filmed a cameo role with him. Speaking about the cameo appearance, Werkmeister admitted he was "freaking out".

In 2008, he joined the judging panel of the Inkys, Australia's only teenage choice book award judged by people under 20 years of age. The aim of the reward is to encourage young people to read. Of his judging role Werkmeister said "Finding the time is the difficult part but some of the books are great so the reading part has been fun."

In 2009, Werkmeister was longlisted for the Logie Award for Most Popular Actor, alongside fellow cast members Steve Bastoni (Steve Parker), Alan Fletcher (Karl Kennedy), Ryan Moloney (Toadfish Rebecchi) and Ian Smith (Harold Bishop). He was included on the longlist for Most Popular Personality on TV, alongside fellow cast members Pippa Black (Elle Robinson), Carla Bonner (Stephanie Scully) and Tom Oliver (Lou Carpenter). The following year, he was longlisted for Most Popular Actor again. Werkmeister starred in the 2010 short film Barrier: the Invisible Machine as an apprentice race pilot. The film was co-produced by Neighbours crew member Terry Shepherd and premiered at the Armageddon Pop Culture Expo at the Melbourne Exhibition Centre.

In October 2010, it was announced that Werkmeister was to leave Neighbours along with Jane Hall (Rebecca Robinson) and Erin Mullally (Declan Napier). Speaking about his decision to leave, Werkmeister said "When I started on Neighbours I was only thirteen, I didn't shave or drive a car so I really have grown up on the show, I've learnt so much, worked with some great people who are now some of my closest friends." His final episode was broadcast on 11 March 2011.

From 2012 until 2014, Werkmeister starred as Josh in Matthew Smolen's webseries Chris & Josh. Werkmeister made a cameo appearance in Australian band Eagle and the Worm's music video for their 2012 single "Give Me Time". In the video, he plays a roller-skating sex symbol. From May to June 2013, Werkmeister performed as Roger Boothby in Barry Lowe's acclaimed stage play The Death of Peter Pan at Melbourne's Chapel Off Chapel. In April 2014, Werkmeister made a brief return to Neighbours as part of his on-screen family, the Kennedys' 20th anniversary.

== Personal life ==
Werkmeister was born in Noble Park, Victoria. He was educated at St Peters College in Cranbourne, Victoria and did most of his schoolwork by correspondence due to his acting commitments. In 2010, he attended his Débutante Ball. His hobbies include skimboarding, playing chess, oil painting, playing guitar and eating. Since leaving Neighbours, Werkmeister has kept a low-profile. In February 2017, he moved to the United States.
