= Kaiya Jones =

Australian actress (born 1996)

- Born: 19 March 1996 (age 30); Glasgow, Scotland
- Occupation: Actress
- Years active: 2005–present

Kaiya Jones (born 19 March 1996) is a Scottish-born Australian actress, best known for playing the role of Sophie Ramsay in the Australian soap opera Neighbours. She previously played Jess Cooper in the third series of The Saddle Club. Jones wrote and directed a short film called Coping, which was screened at Tropfest in 2013. In 2014, she joined the cast of Party Tricks.

== Early and personal life ==
Jones was born in Glasgow, Scotland but moved to Australia with her parents in 2005. Jones studied at Preshil. Her hobbies include acting, writing screenplays and stories, as well as writing her own songs and playing the guitar. Jones is also a supporter of the Australian Orangutan Project which raises funds to support the protection and conservation of orangutans.

== Career ==
Jones played the role of Jess Cooper in The Saddle Club from 2008 to 2009. In February 2009, it was announced Jones had been cast as Sophie Ramsay in the Australian soap opera Neighbours. Jones began filming her first scenes with Neighbours in the same month. Of her casting, Jones told Samantha Booth of the Daily Record, "Filming Neighbours is so much fun. I just love my job and wouldn't want to be doing anything else. The cast and crew are so kind and lovely. They are practically my second family now. They're also very patient".

On 26 November 2012, it was announced that Jones would be leaving Neighbours. She made her screen exit the following year. In 2013, Jones made a guest appearance as Poppy in an episode of Miss Fisher's Murder Mysteries. Jones has written and directed a short film called Coping, which focuses on three orphaned children who move in with their uncle. Coping was one of 16 films selected to screen at Tropfest on 8 December 2013. Jones was named Best Female Actor at the festival. In 2014 Jones was cast in the miniseries Party Tricks.

In 2017, Jones wrote and directed a short film called Jolly Roger which was shown at the St Kilda Film Festival on 22 May 2017.

== Filmography ==
=== Film ===
Year	Title	Role	Notes
2013	Coping	Abigail	Short film Tropfest Award for Best Female Actor; Writer and director
2015	Alienation		Short film
2014	Lean	Young Jennifer	Short film
2017	Jolly Roger		Short film Writer and director
2017	I Am Not	Faye	Short film

=== Television ===
Year	Title	Role	Notes
2008–2009	The Saddle Club	Jess Cooper	Main cast
2009–2014	Neighbours	Sophie Ramsay	Main cast
2013	Miss Fisher's Murder Mysteries	Poppy	Episode: "Marked for Murder"
2014	Party Tricks	Matilda McLeod	Main cast
2015	Footballer Wants a Wife	Production Assistant/Substitute	Episodes: "Pack Date" & "Slave to Love"
2016	The Doctor Blake Mysteries	Robyn Dawson	Episode: "Against the Odds"
2021	Harrow	Madison Moreland	Episode: "Ut Biberent Quoniam Esse Nollent"
2023	Turn Up the Volume	Stevie	Recurring role

== See also ==
- Scottish Australian
