= Ashleigh Brewer =

Australian actress (born 1990)

- Born: Ashleigh May Brewer; 9 December 1990 (age 35); Brisbane, Queensland, Australia
- Occupation: Actress
- Years active: 2003–present
- Spouse: Mark Bauch (m. 2025)

Ashleigh May Brewer (born 9 December 1990) is an Australian actress. She had a recurring role in The Sleepover Club, before she joined the cast of H_{2}O: Just Add Water. Brewer played the role of Kate Ramsay in the long-running Australian soap opera Neighbours from 2009 until 2014. She portrayed Ivy Forrester on the CBS Daytime soap opera The Bold and the Beautiful from 2014 until 2018. She returned in a recurring capacity from 2024. She joined the cast of Home and Away as Chelsea Campbell for six months in 2018.

== Early life ==
Born and raised in Brisbane, Brewer graduated from Forest Lake College in 2008. After moving to Melbourne, Brewer shared a flat with fellow Neighbours star Margot Robbie. Brewer revealed in an interview for Stellar in February 2026 that she developed an eating disorder when she was 18, shortly after relocating to Melbourne to start work on Neighbours. She eventually received help for it in her thirties and has been in recovery for several years.

== Career ==
Brewer appeared in the recurring role of Alana in The Sleepover Club when she was twelve years old. She went on to make minor appearances in Blue Heelers and H_{2}O: Just Add Water.

A week after graduating from her school, Brewer arrived in Melbourne to look for acting work. While she was in the city, Brewer successfully auditioned for the ongoing role of Kate Ramsay in the long-running soap opera Neighbours. The actress relocated to Melbourne for filming and she made her debut as Kate on 15 May 2009. The following year, Brewer was nominated for the Most Popular New Female Talent Logie Award. In July 2013, Brewer celebrated filming 1000 episodes.

After nearly five years of playing Kate, Brewer confirmed her departure from Neighbours in November 2013. Brewer decided to quit the show to pursue new acting projects. She filmed her final scenes the following month. Brewer's character was killed off and she admitted that she was delighted with Kate's exit storyline.

On 22 May 2014, it was announced that Brewer had been cast in the newly created role of Ivy Forrester in the American soap opera The Bold and the Beautiful. Brewer's character is the niece of established character Eric Forrester (John McCook). Brewer began filming on 24 May. She had a three-year contract with the show and made her debut as Ivy in July 2014. Brewer appeared in a documentary special celebrating Neighbours' 30th anniversary titled Neighbours 30th: The Stars Reunite, which aired in Australia and the UK in March 2015. In January 2018, Brewer announced her decision to quit The Bold and the Beautiful; explaining her decision, Brewer cited her friend Margot Robbie as her inspiration, in her own desires to achieve other acting opportunities.

Following her departure from The Bold and the Beautiful, Brewer was cast in the HBO film My Dinner with Hervé. She also joined the cast of Home and Away for six months as Chelsea Campbell. Brewer was asked to extend her contract with the show, but she was unable to and returned to Los Angeles. Brewer next appeared in Tom Kapinos's television comedy-drama Lovestruck, alongside Rachel Bilson, Andie MacDowell and Richard Roxburgh. She also appeared in the 2020 short film At the Edge of Night, and played the uncredited role of Totally Hair Barbie in the 2023 film Barbie.

On 26 March 2024, it was announced that Brewer would be reprising her role as Ivy Forrester in The Bold and the Beautiful. Brewer later said that she was "thrilled to be going back in such a serious way", as producers also introduced Ivy's niece Electra (Laneya Grace).

== Personal life ==
On 15 January 2024, Brewer announced she was engaged to her partner, filmmaker and studio executive Mark Bauch. They were introduced to one another by mutual friend and Brewer's former H_{2}O: Just Add Water co-star Phoebe Tonkin. Brewer and Bauch married in Santa Barbara, California on 11 December 2025. On 15 February 2026, Brewer announced she and Bauch were expecting their first child.

== Filmography ==
Year	Title	Role	Notes
2003	The Sleepover Club	Alana	Recurring role (season 1)
2005	Blue Heelers	Lelah Burton	Episode: "Face Value"
2006–2008	H_{2}O: Just Add Water	Gracie	Recurring role
2009–2014	Neighbours	Kate Ramsay	Series regular Nominated – Logie Award for Most Popular New Female Talent (2010)
2014–2018; 2024–present	The Bold and the Beautiful	Ivy Forrester	Series regular (2014–2018); Recurring role (2024–present)
2015	Neighbours 30th: The Stars Reunite	Herself	Documentary
2018–2019	Home and Away	Chelsea Campbell	Recurring role
2018	My Dinner with Hervé	Camille Hagen	TV movie
2019	Lovestruck	Greta	TV movie
2020	At the Edge of Night	Alexis	Short film
2023	Barbie	Totally Hair Barbie	Uncredited
