= Andrew Robinson (Neighbours) =

Fictional Australian TV character

- Neighbours character
- Portrayed by: Shannon Holmes (1991–1992); Jordan Patrick Smith (2009–2022)
- Duration: 1991–1992, 2009–2013, 2022
- First appearance: 13 November 1991
- Last appearance: 25 July 2022
- Introduced by: Don Battye (1991); Susan Bower (2009); Jason Herbison (2022)
In-universe information
- Occupation: Lassiters Hotel employee; Student; Co-owner of The Waterhole
- Family: Robinson
- Father: Paul Robinson
- Mother: Christina Alessi
- Stepmother: Rebecca Robinson
- Brothers: Oliver Barnes (step); Declan Napier (step)
- Half-brothers: David Tanaka; Leo Tanaka; Robert Robinson; Cameron Robinson
- Half-sisters: Amy Williams; Elle Robinson
- Grandfathers: Jim Robinson
- Aunts: Lucy Robinson; Caroline Alessi
- First cousins: Kate Ramsay; Harry Ramsay; Sophie Ramsay
- Other relatives: Helen Daniels; Marco Alessi; Rick Alessi

Andrew Robinson is a fictional character from the Australian soap opera Neighbours, played by Jordan Patrick Smith from 2009 to 2013 and in 2022. He made his first screen appearance during the episode broadcast on 13 November 1991. Shannon Holmes played the role from the character's birth in 1991 until his departure the following year. Andrew's backstory was subject to retroactive continuity to explain Smith's Scottish accent, and he had his age reduced so that he would be a teenager on his return. Andrew is the only son of Christina Alessi (Gayle Blakeney) and Paul Robinson (Stefan Dennis). His storylines have included his return to Erinsborough, having an affair with Donna Freedman (Margot Robbie), fighting with his stepbrother and becoming involved in a love triangle with Natasha Williams (Valentina Novakovic) and Summer Hoyland (Jordy Lucas). In November 2012, it was announced Smith would be leaving Neighbours and Andrew made his screen departure on 29 March 2013. In 2022, Smith reprised the role in one episode.

== Creation and casting ==
The character was created as part of Paul Robinson (Stefan Dennis) and Christina Alessi's (Gayle Blakeney) relationship arc. Both Dennis and Blakeney were pleased with the pregnancy storyline. Blakeney carried out her own research into the subject, and she prepared for the birth scenes by visiting a Melbourne hospital to talk to the midwives. She admitted that she could not wait to work with the baby on set. Producers did not want to reveal the sex of the baby until the birth aired. Dennis revealed that both he and Blakeney asked the show's executive producer and he refused to tell them. Paul and Christina are seen discussing names, particularly boys names, and Dennis said that his character is a "typical Australian chauvinistic male so, of course, he'd like a son to carry on the name and all that." Blakeney explained that with Chrissie's Italian background, she wants the name Benito, as someone in the family has always been called Benito. Dennis added that Paul would be pretty happy with a girl, as he just wants to be a good father and husband. The baby, later named Andrew, was born on-screen on 13 November 1991. He was portrayed by Shannon Holmes until his departure in 1992.

In September 2009, it was announced the character would be returning to Neighbours after a seventeen-year absence. Darren Rowe of Digital Spy reported twenty-year-old Queenslander Jordan Smith had been cast as Andrew. Smith told David Knox of TV Tonight that shortly after returning from a Gold Coast music festival, he discovered he had seventeen missed calls from his agent telling him he had an audition for Neighbours back down on the Gold Coast. Smith explained "So I drove all the way back down and it was the only audition I've ever had where I really didn't care too much about it. I wasn't very prepared so I just went in, to see what happened. Two weeks later I had a phone call saying I had the job. Crazy." Smith received the call while he was in hospital, following a workplace accident which left his nose swollen and infected. This led to Smith almost turning down the role. Smith's first scenes as Andrew were broadcast in December 2009. His role was initially supposed to last for six weeks. In 2011, it was announced that Smith had signed a new contract to stay with Neighbours for another two years.

== Development ==
=== Characterisation ===
The character's backstory was changed to accommodate Smith's Scottish accent. Smith had grown up in Scotland before moving to Australia as a teenager. Originally Andrew and Christina were said to have moved from Brazil back to Australia, but this was amended to include an intervening stay in Scotland. Smith speaks in a refined version of his natural accent to be understood. Of this he said "The producers have been fantastic in accommodating my accent. I have had to refine it so the other cast members and audience can understand me. Although I still get that 'what the hell did he just say?' about every second scene." The character also had a noticeable change in age. Andrew was born on screen in November 1991, but his age was decreased to sixteen and his birth date changed to 20 August 1993.

A writer for the BBC's Neighbours website commented that Andrew was "a delightful little baby" who had endured an unsettled beginning to life. Following his return, the character was portrayed as having a deceptive persona. Of this Smith said "He is very calculating and comes across as extremely selfish. However, there is a softer side to him but, for the moment, you only see glimpses of that." Smith also revealed some of the similarities in the comparison of his character and his on-screen father stating: "There are definitely characteristics of his father. He is very motivated by money and status like his father and would think nothing of burning someone if it meant he would get ahead." Network Ten describe the character. as having the charm and confidence others find intoxicating. They also add that he has a gift of an "inexplicable ability to make anyone he's talking to feel like they're the only person in the room." They also comment on how the character longs for his father to take notice of his actions and how much he wants him to notice him as a would-be businessman. Holy Soap said Andrew is a "bit of a chip off the old block and is always keen to make a quick buck."

=== Relationships ===
==== Donna Freedman ====
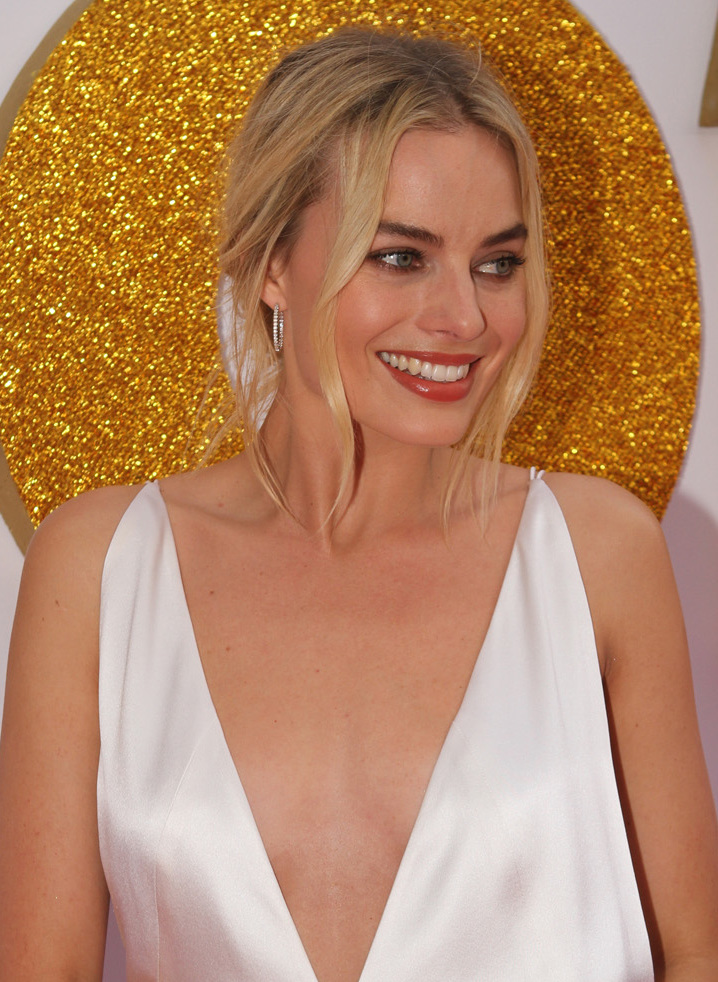
Margot Robbie portrayed Donna Freedman

Andrew first storyline saw him have a one-night stand with Donna Freedman (Margot Robbie) during schoolies week. Donna was going through a rough patch in her relationship with Ringo Brown (Sam Clark) and when they argue at a dance party, Donna "catches the eye" of Andrew, the club promoter. Robbie explained "Andrew makes the first move to come over and have a chat. He's obviously very charming – and good-looking. Sparks fly straightaway." After they kiss at the party, Donna decides to go back to Andrew's place and she does not return to her room until the morning. A few weeks later, Andrew turns up in Erinsborough to visit his father, much to Donna's shock. Robbie stated that seeing Andrew again was the last thing Donna was expecting and she worries that he is going to tell everyone about what happened between them. TV Week's Jackie Brygel commented "Andrew's appearance has devastating consequences for several Ramsay Street residents in the months to come – particularly Donna, who's determined to keep her relationship with Ringo on track at any cost." Andrew puts pressure on Donna to give into their attraction for each other and they kiss. Robbie called Andrew "a game player" and said he likes the effect he has on Donna. When Ringo chooses to attend a university orientation evening instead of helping Donna out with her fashion business, Andrew becomes aware of her disappointment. He then seizes the opportunity to make "his presence felt in her life".

Robbie believed that because Andrew is more into the fashion scene and an aspiring businessman, he is perfect for the world Donna is trying to break into. One of Andrew and Donna's trysts is recorded onto a laptop and Andrew copies it to a disc, without Donna's knowledge. The disc falls into the hands of school bully, Scott Griffin (Eamonn George), who then shows the tape at the local bar, exposing Andrew and Donna's affair. The tape is later leaked onto the internet, which embarrasses Donna. A few months later, Donna and Ringo become engaged and they plan to marry quickly, so they can live in the United States. Andrew tells Donna that her marriage is doomed because she will probably cheat on Ringo again. When Donna catches Andrew shredding her paperwork for the trip, she slaps him across the face. A week later, Andrew makes sure Ringo witnesses him kissing Donna. She then becomes interested in why Andrew is trying to wreck her future with Ringo. Robbie explained to an Inside Soap writer "Donna is baffled. She thinks it's nuts that Andrew would give a hoot about her moving away, and knows he must have some kind of agenda. Despite the fact Andrew has done some pretty hideous things to Donna, she's probably the only person who really gets him." Donna later realises that Andrew is worried about losing her friendship and when she leaves, he will have no one. Ringo becomes angry with Andrew's actions and he punches him.

==== Natasha Williams ====
Andrew begins dating Natasha Williams (Valentina Novakovic) in 2010. A few months later, Natasha starts to have doubts about what the relationship and wonders if it is only based on the physical aspects. Natasha puts Andrew's feelings to the test by telling him she wants their relationship to be about communicating and understanding each other's needs. John Burfitt of TV Soap said Natasha is devastated as "Andrew doesn't react very well at all to this dramatic change of direction." Andrew likes her, but he is not as serious as she is about the relationship. Andrew and Natasha briefly split and when they get back together, Lyn Cameron of The Advertiser said Natasha is thrilled "as she's completely obsessed" with Andrew. In early 2011, a love triangle storyline between Natasha, Andrew and Summer Hoyland (Jordy Lucas) began. Andrew beings to develop feelings for Summer, but he is warned off by her grandmother, Lyn Scully (Janet Andrewartha). Andrew later expresses concern for Summer when she collapses at a party and Natasha notices. She later asks Andrew if he loves her, but he does not reply. Of Andrew's situation, a writer for the official Neighbours website said "Hooking up with Natasha could've been the single most stupid thing he's done so far, and that's saying something."

"It has been rather lengthy but I've enjoyed it. We've become really good friends out of it. It's certainly opened up the characters and showed different aspects to their personalities which I hope has been interesting for the viewers."

— Smith on the love triangle storyline (2011)

==== Summer Hoyland ====
Lucas told a reporter for Holy Soap that she was backing the pairing of Summer and Andrew and wanted things between them to move along. In December 2010, it was revealed that Summer and Andrew would give into their feelings for each other shortly before they become trapped in a house fire. The storyline started with Andrew becoming jealous of Summer dating his business partner, Tomas Bersky (Tim Munley). Smith explained that until that moment, Andrew had thought Summer was too good for him, but when she goes out with Tomas, it is a wake up call for him. Andrew lies to Natasha about having a business meeting and he goes to see Summer. She tells him that she wants to be with him and they kiss. Smith said "Andrew also knows that if he doesn't act now and let Summer know how he feels, it'll be too late. When Summer tells Andrew she wants to be with him, he's completely overwhelmed. He's never felt this way about a girl before." Andrew promises Summer that he will break up with Natasha the next day and they have sex. At the same time, a fire breaks out and Natasha goes in to save Summer, not knowing Andrew is there too. Smith told a writer for Holy Soap that filming the fire scenes was "great fun" and that they gave him a "sense of what it would be like on an action movie." When he was asked who Andrew should be with, Smith thought Natasha was the right one for him because they are very alike. He said Summer "would cool off" as soon as she realised that Andrew is up to no good.

When Andrew goes to break up with Natasha, she tells him that she is pregnant. Smith quipped that the news is a huge shock to Andrew and he explained "He thought he was going in one direction, and then all of sudden, everything changed. However, not having a father around when he was growing up, he decides pretty quickly that he wants to give it the best shot he can." Andrew supports Natasha and tries to dedicate himself to the baby. Smith told Daniel Kilkelly of Digital Spy that Andrew is oblivious to the possibility that Natasha is lying to him as he is focused on doing the right thing. Summer later exposes Natasha lie and Smith said Andrew is "gutted" by the news, as he had accepted the idea of becoming a father. Andrew cannot accept that Natasha could be so cruel and Smith stated that Andrew had been "ripped apart" because of the lie. Because of Andrew's state of mind, Smith believed that he and Summer would not get together straight away, saying "his head is a mess over what's happened, they try to get together but she wants him to be one way, and he just isn't in the right frame of mind – he's racing at a 100 miles an hour to make sense of what has happened." Smith added that he hoped the storyline had reached an end as Andrew, Summer and Natasha's friendships have been pushed beyond their limits. He explained that he would like to see them all move in a different direction.

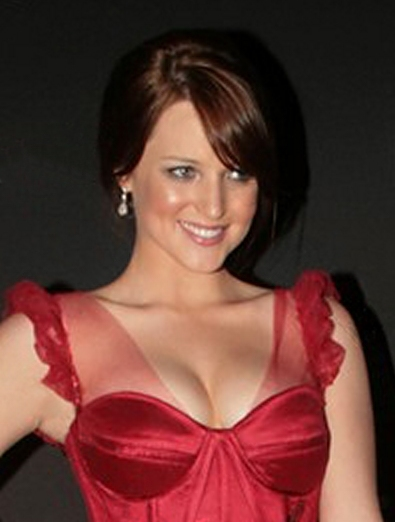
Andrew had a long term relationship with Summer Hoyland, played by Jordy Lucas

Summer later explains to Andrew that they cannot be together as she feels that the situation with Natasha never would have happened if they had not cheated on her. Lucas said Summer feels that the whole situation is messy and that Andrew needs to sort his baggage out first. Natasha tries to get Andrew and Summer to talk through their issues, but when they get together they argue and Andrew claims Summer is always judging him. Andrew then kisses Lisa Devine (Sophie Tilson) in front of Summer, leaving her gutted. Lucas said that while it would be nice for Summer and Andrew to end up together, she believes they are more interesting when their relationship is strained. When Lyn announces that she plans to relocate the family to Bendigo, Summer is devastated at the thought of leaving Andrew. Just as Lyn is driving out of Ramsay Street, Andrew runs after the car and declares his love for Summer. Summer decides to stay in Erinsborough to be with Andrew and they begin a proper relationship. In January 2012, it was confirmed Summer and Andrew would break up later in the year. Lucas told Digital Spy's Daniel Kilkelly that the pressure on Andrew and Summer's relationship and the different directions they are going in eventually takes a toll on them. Lucas believed the couple would be over for good, but stated they could reunite in the future as they love each other so much.

When Summer tries to repay a debt to Paul on Andrew's behalf, he accuses her of "suffocating" him. After talking about their relationship issues, Summer suggests they take a break and Andrew agrees. A writer for Inside Soap said from Andrew's point of view, it seems more and more likely that Summer does not want to get back together with him. When Natasha throws a party, Andrew meets Belinda Ferry (Rachel Jessica Tan) and they get talking. Summer believes they are flirting and she decides to leave the party. Andrew notices her leave and thinks that she is no longer interested in him. However, Summer returns to the party to talk to Andrew and catches him kissing Belinda. Andrew and Summer briefly reunite a couple of months later. They kiss and then have a one-night stand. Lucas told Digital Spy's Paul Millar that Summer's only thinking that she wants Andrew in the moment and does not think of the consequences. The actress added "He was Summer's first true love, so she will always have a special place in her heart for him."

=== Dance party ===
Shortly after Natasha's pregnancy lie is revealed, Andrew throws himself into his dance party business. Andrew had previously held a party in 2009, but he got into debt and was chased to Erinsborough by a security team who wanted paying. Holy Soap said that "history looks set to repeat itself " when Andrew tries to organise a dance party with his partner Tomas. Smith revealed that Andrew would "face a crisis of conscience" when he discovers that Tomas is involved in some "dodgy dealings" at the club where the party is held. Andrew initially turns the other cheek, but he struggles when Natasha becomes suspicious about the party and Tomas. The situation becomes more stressful for Andrew, when Summer comes to the party. Smith told TV Week, "Andrew is terrified about what can go wrong – he knows he's in too deep, but he's happy to let it continue as long as he has nothing to do with it." Natasha comes to the club and tries to help Andrew out, but she is forced to turn to her father and he calls Detective Mark Brennan (Scott McGregor), who arrives at the club. Andrew is under pressure to come clean and he realises that the situation has become serious. Smith said "He's tried to brush it off, but he knows he needs to do the right thing." Mark and the police do not find any evidence of illegal activity, but Andrew feels the need to tell them the truth. He also decides to tell his father about Tomas's actions.

=== Crash and epilepsy ===
"To start with Andrew just ignores the symptoms. He blames them on the crash. He doesn't want to delve into things. But there comes a point where he can't ignore the symptoms anymore."

— Smith on Andrew's condition (2012)

In August 2012, Andrew is involved in a car accident while heading to a concert with his friends. The crash occurs after Natasha learns Andrew has sold an app, that they worked on together, without her permission. Their argument leads Chris Pappas (James Mason) to lose control of the car and crash. Smith commented "So many lives are in danger." Andrew suffers a serious head injury as a result of the accident. He later struggles with "worrying neurological symptoms" including; dizziness, severe headaches and black outs. Andrew keeps his health worries to himself because he is determined not to show signs of weakness. Andrew is worried further when he blacks out at home and discovers he has suffered a fit. He sets up a camera to see what happens if he is affected again. However, when nothing happens, Andrew decides to go to the hospital for a check up. After undergoing tests by Karl Kennedy (Alan Fletcher), Andrew has "his life turned upside down" when he is diagnosed with epilepsy.

Karl urges Andrew to tell his family and friends about the diagnosis, but he does not listen and tries to deal with it by himself. When Paul offers to buy Charlie's with him, it reinforces Andrew's decision to not reveal his condition. Andrew's behaviour changes and he starts demanding that his friends give him lifts, despite knowing that hiding his condition will not help win them backSmith revealed that he researched epilepsy in preparation for the storyline and commented that Andrew "should definitely go and get help".

=== Departure and return ===
On 26 November 2012, Erin Miller from TV Week announced that Smith would be leaving Neighbours, along with two other cast members. Miller believed that Smith was keen to pursue other acting projects. The actor filmed his final scenes in December. Kilkelly revealed that the show's storyliners were lining up "heartbreak and triumphs" for the character's exits. Executive producer Richard Jasek stated "All the characters departing will leave a legacy on Ramsay Street which is testament to the extraordinary talents of the actors playing them. Communities are constantly changing and Neighbours is reflective of this." Andrew made his screen exit on 29 March 2013.

On 7 May 2022, Dan Seddon of Digital Spy announced Smith would reprise his role for the show's final episodes. He was one of twenty-three cast members who agreed to return for the show's end. The "most memorable characters" from each decade were chosen to return and Executive producer Jason Herbison commented that it ensured there was "something for everyone as Neighbours draws to a close."

== Storylines ==
Andrew is the only son of Paul Robinson and Christina Alessi. There was an initial quarrel between Paul and Christina over what he should be called, with Christina keen on naming him Benito after her uncle (George Spartels) and Paul intent on Paul Robinson Junior. They eventually settled on Andrew and he was christened soon after. Within the first eighteen months of his life, Andrew experienced considerable turmoil, with Paul suffering a nervous breakdown after experiencing financial difficulties and the breakdown of Christina and Paul's marriage after Paul had an affair with Christina's sister. Andrew was then in the midst of a custody battle, but Paul and Christina patched up their differences before leaving to run a branch of Lassiter's in Hawaii. The family did not settle there for long as Paul was forced to go on the run after framing his brother-in-law Philip Martin (Ian Rawlings) for fraud. They moved to Brazil for a while, but eventually Paul returned to Australia and gave himself up, he then served several years in prison. Christina and Andrew lived in Scotland for a while, before they returned to Australia and settled down in Sydney.

Andrew organises an event at a club during schoolies week and he meets Donna Freedman. Andrew flirts with Donna and they have a one-night stand. A week later, Andrew arrives in Erinsborough to see his father, Paul Robinson. Andrew explains to Paul that he owes $5,000 to the security firm from his club event and Paul gives him the money. Paul's partner, Rebecca (Jane Hall), catches Andrew trying to leave and she tells him Paul deserves more respect, so Andrew decides to stay. Andrew pursues Donna and they begin an affair, behind her boyfriend, Ringo Brown's, back. One of their trysts is accidentally recorded and the footage is shown to an audience at Charlie's bar. Andrew then begins competing with his cousin, Harry Ramsay (William Moore), for the affections of their neighbour, Summer Hoyland. Andrew begins fighting with Rebecca's son, Declan (James Sorensen), who decides to move out. Andrew accidentally sends an email to all of the Lassiter's Hotel clients telling them the hotel no longer wants their business. He asks Declan for help, but Declan refuses to help him. Paul finds out and threatens to send Andrew home to his mother.

When Summer decides to throw a party, Andrew posts the details of the venue on Facebook. The party gets out of control and the police are called. Andrew refuses to apologise to Summer's stepmother, Stephanie Scully (Carla Bonner), and Rebecca decides to call Christina. However, Christina explains she does not want Andrew to come home. Andrew tries to split Rebecca and Paul up by asking Kyle Canning (Chris Milligan) to flirt with Rebecca. Andrew then tells Declan that Paul is keeping secrets about his financial situation, knowing Declan will tell Rebecca. While working on an advertising campaign for PirateNet, Andrew meets Natasha Williams. He invites her to go to a concert with him and they begin dating. Andrew tries to talk Donna out of marrying Ringo and he kisses her. Ringo punches him and when Natasha learns what happened, she breaks off their relationship. Andrew's friend, Chris Pappas (James Mason), comes out and Andrew is initially supportive, until Chris confesses to having a crush on him. They later make up.

Andrew reveals to Paul that Declan (now Erin Mullally) and Diana Marshall (Jane Badler) are trying to oust him from Lassiter's. Andrew is angered when Paul does not thank him for his help and when he is pushed from the Lassiter's mezzanine, Andrew becomes a suspect. He is questioned by Detective Mark Brennan, but is released without charge. Andrew rekindles his relationship with Natasha, despite developing feelings for Summer. Lyn Scully warns Andrew to stay away from her and he becomes jealous when Summer goes on a date with his business partner, Tomas. Andrew confesses his feelings to Summer and they have sex, unaware a fire has started in her living room. When they wake up, they realise they are trapped. Michael Williams (Sandy Winton) enters the room carrying Natasha and the firefighters get them all out. Andrew is taken to hospital when he undergoes surgery for internal bleeding. Andrew and Summer learn Natasha came to save Summer and decide to keep their relationship a secret until she has recovered from her injuries.

Andrew tells Summer that he is going to break up with Natasha, but before he can, she reveals she is pregnant. Andrew decides to stand by her and the baby, ending his relationship with Summer. Natasha goes for an ultrasound scan alone and gives Andrew the images of their baby. Summer reveals the images are fake and Natasha admits she lied about being pregnant because she saw Andrew and Summer kissing. Andrew is devastated and he throws himself into his new business with Tomas. Andrew becomes concerned when he learns Tomas is going to sell drugs at their party, but he does not tell anyone about it, until the party is raiding by the police. Andrew begins dating Lisa Devine to make Summer jealous. When Summer reveals she is moving to Bendigo, Andrew does not say anything. However, just as she is leaving the street, Andrew chases the car and tells Summer he loves her. Summer decides to stay in Erinsborough to be with Andrew. When goes away, Andrew turns their house into a hostel for backpackers to raise some money.

Andrew and Chris decide to buy old cars, fix them up and sell them on for a profit and Paul praises Andrew's new business venture. Andrew decides to help Summer out with her port folio for university, by editing footage of the History Wall project from her time lapse camera. While Andrew is viewing the footage he spots his cousin, Kate Ramsay (Ashleigh Brewer), kissing Noah Parkin (Orpheus Pledger), a student. Kate begs him to delete the footage and he does. Summer is devastated when Andrew tells her the footage is gone. When the truth about Kate and Noah is revealed, Andrew tells Summer that he deleted the footage to protect Kate and she forgives him. Andrew gets an embarrassing tattoo during schoolies and tries not to tell Summer about it. Summer becomes suspicious of his behaviour, causing him to reveal the truth. Andrew tries to sell his car to Danielle Paquette (Georgia Bolton) to get some money to have the tattoo removed, but Paul finds out. He gives Andrew the money and makes him work extra shifts in the hotel.

Sophie gives Andrew the idea to start up Robinson Entertainment again and he organises a gig for Red Cotton. Paul tells Andrew to look after Sophie at the gig and when he catches her kissing Corey O'Donahue (Toby Wallace), he sends her home. Andrew later learns Corey is the younger brother of Red Cotton's lead singer, Griffin (William Ewing), and he tries to manipulate Sophie into dating him. Andrew helps Red Cotton film a music video and the band agree to him becoming their manager. Andrew tries to raise Red Cotton's profile and he secures them a monthlong residency at Charlie's. When Andrew learns Summer tried to pay off his debt to Paul, they argue and agree to go on a break. Andrew kisses Belinda Ferry at a party and Summer tells him their relationship is over. Andrew starts managing The Right Prescription when they pull in more money than Red Cotton. Summer begins dating Griffin and Andrew learns he is also seeing other girls. He asks Griffin to tell Summer the truth, but he refuses and Andrew drops the band.

Andrew and Summer later have a one-night stand. When Andrew meets Natasha's university friend, Ed Lee (Sebastian Gregory), he comes up with an idea to use Ed's probability theory to make an odds calculator mobile app. Andrew tries to cut Ed out the publicity for the app, which upsets Natasha. Dale Madden (David Reyne) makes an offer for the app and Andrew forges Natasha's signature to sells it. Andrew and his friends decide to go to a gig in the city and during the journey, they find Sophie in the boot of the car. Andrew talks Chris into letting her sit on Summer's lap. Natasha learns Andrew sold the app and forged her signature, causing an argument to break out. Natasha threatens to call the police and Andrew tries to grab her phone. He knocks Chris' arm, causing him to lose control of the car and crash. Andrew suffers a head injury and his friends blame him for the crash. Andrew later experiences disorientation, dizzy spells and a fit. Karl diagnoses him with epilepsy and Aidan Foster (Bobby Morley) encourages Andrew to tell Paul the news, but he refuses.

Andrew purchases some medication for his epilepsy online and Aidan helps him manage the dose. He gives Andrew a blood test and files it under a false name, something that Andrew later uses to blackmail him with. Andrew reveals that he was to blame for the crash, which ends Paul's lawsuit against Chris. Andrew suffers a fit in front of Natasha and she begins supporting him. Natasha encourages Andrew to seek help and he books himself into a sleep study. Andrew later suffers a fit in front of Paul and reveals that he has epilepsy. Paul tells Andrew that he cannot work at Charlie's any more and Andrew initially blames Natasha for the situation. Andrew becomes frustrated at being kept away from Charlie's and he threatens to leave home. Andrew tries to impress a bar critic, but throws him out when Natasha becomes uncomfortable with his flirting. Andrew and Natasha later share a kiss and begin dating again. When Natasha questions if their relationship is the same as last time, Andrew reassures her that it is not and he loves her. Paul reveals his plans to build apartments at Lassiter's and Andrew offers to help sell them. Sheila Canning (Colette Mann) decides to purchase one and hands over the deposit to Andrew. When Andrew learns that Paul has not got council approval, he tries to get Sheila to change her mind and take back her money. Natasha tells Andrew that she is leaving Erinsborough to travel around Europe and he agrees to come with her. Paul is initially angry when Andrew tells him that he is leaving, but later comes to see him and Natasha off, wishing them both well.

Nine years later, Andrew and four of his siblings video call Paul to cheer him up when they learn Paul may be losing his business. Andrew confirms that he and Natasha are still together and are enjoying living in New York. He also suggests to Paul and his brothers, David (Takaya Honda) and Leo Tanaka (Tim Kano), that they move to New York to be with the rest of the Robinsons.

== Reception ==
Whilst played by Holmes, a writer for the BBC stated that Andrew's most notable moment was "Being born." Following the character's return to Neighbours in 2009, a Holy Soap writer said that Andrew's most memorable moment was "Getting steamy with gorgeous Donna while she was going out with Ringo. The incident just happened to be recorded, sparking the end of Donna and Ringo's relationship." During that storyline, Cameron Adams of the Herald Sun commented on the character's accent, saying "Watch for: Andrew's hard-to-pin-down accent. It's part Scottish, part ocker."

The character became popular with female viewers and Smith revealed that he had received marriage proposals. A critic for The Sun-Herald noted that trouble follows Andrew wherever he goes, and stated: "The baby-faced teen has been in Erinsborough less than a year but has earned the reputation of Ramsay Street rebel. He's had an affair with Donna (Margot Robbie), ripped off a security firm and taken credit for work done by Declan (Erin Mullally). This week, Andrew continues to be a nuisance, inviting Chris (James Mason) to a party held by Summer (Jordy Lucas). When Chris gets involved in a fight, it's clear he's fallen under Andrew's influence."
