= Rosemary Daniels =

- Neighbours character
- Rosemary in 2005
- Portrayed by: Joy Chambers
- Duration: 1986–1987, 1989–1991, 1993–1998, 2005, 2010
- First appearance: 20 February 1986
- Last appearance: 20 August 2010
- Created by: Reg Watson
- Introduced by: Reg Watson (1986); Don Battye (1989); Ian Bradley (1993); Ric Pellizzeri (2005); Susan Bower (2010)
In-universe information
- Occupation: Businesswoman
- Mother: Heather Ambrose
- Adoptive father: Bill Daniels
- Adoptive mother: Helen Daniels
- Sisters: Anne Robinson (adoptive)
- Adoptive daughters: Tracey Dawson
- Nephews: Paul Robinson; Scott Robinson
- Nieces: Julie Martin; Lucy Robinson
- Other relatives: Robert Robinson; Cameron Robinson; Andrew Robinson; Amy Williams; Elle Robinson

Rosemary Daniels is a fictional character from the Australian Network Ten soap opera Neighbours, played by Joy Chambers. She made her first on-screen appearance on 20 February 1986 and appeared intermittently. Rosemary is the adoptive daughter of Helen Daniels and the sister of Anne Robinson. Rosemary has been portrayed as a tough businesswoman who runs the Daniels Corporation. Chambers reprised the role in 2005 and returned for several episodes to help celebrate the show's 20th anniversary. Rosemary returned in 2010 for four episodes to celebrate the 25th anniversary. She made the first of her appearances on 6 July 2010 and the last on 20 August 2010. Following Chambers' death, Rosemary was killed off-screen in 2024.

== Creation and casting ==
Rosemary was introduced as the adopted daughter of Helen Daniels (Anne Haddy). She was conceived by executive producer Reg Watson, as an alternative female character to the married and teenage females within the serial at the time. Actress Joy Chambers auditioned for Watson and she said she was "delighted to land the role". Chambers made her first appearance in early 1986, as "high-powered businesswoman" Rosemary returns to Erinsborough from New York to find her birth mother. At the conclusion of the storyline, Chambers returned to her home in Bermuda. In November of that year, she filmed a further guest appearance, which aired in 1987.

Commenting on her character's recurring status, Chambers told Jacqueline Lee Lewis of The Sydney Morning Herald: "The thing about Rosemary is she can come and go. She brings a bit of glamour to Ramsay Street in a way." Chambers also said that she always looked forward to playing Rosemary, as she liked performing and enjoyed working with the show's cast members, including Haddy. She thought that for Rosemary to keep returning, there needed to be a "good viable storyline", as she did not want her character to be written in just because she wanted to come back.

== Development ==
=== Characterisation ===
Rosemary as she appeared in a 1980s episode of Neighbours.

Rosemary's persona has been portrayed through her no nonsense business minded ways. Chambers has described Rosemary as having a business woman's "take-no-prisoners" attitude. Chambers also stated during an interview in 2003, the reasons why she believed Rosemary was popular with viewers, stating: "I think some of her popularity is due to the fact that she could be relied upon to stir things up; that she was not wishy washy and that she stood her ground with men the same way she did with women." Also adding that Rosemary worked better as a recurring character because of her personality. Chambers has also claimed Rosemary's hidden softer side was shown whilst adopting Tracey Dawson (Emily Mortimore), helping her mother Helen and to the rest of her family. Of why her character was portrayed in this way, Chambers has said: "Reg Watson came up with the Rosemary Daniels character as an alternative to many women in the street who were mothers or young women growing up and feeling their way. So yes she symbolised the strength of the female in the Neighbours' saga. Perhaps you could say that Rosemary was there as a point of reference for the emancipated female. Yet mums and married women in the viewing audience related to her too because Rosemary did fall in love a few times. She would have married but the relationships always ended sadly and so she never did. I think Rosemary realised she was in truth, 'married' to her work: it gave her great joy."

Network Ten described Rosemary as being "ruthless" and Channel Five's Holy Soap website described Rosemary as a "tough businesswoman". Rosemary has also been described as being "nice" and "cute, but cunning". Of her relationships with family, Rosemary has always been devoted to her mother Helen. When Rosemary adopts Tracey Dawson, she is terrified that it would ruin her career, as she had always put business before family planning. They eventually find out they share a lot in common and get on with each other.

=== Relationship with Gerard Singer ===
Rosemary begins a relationship with Gerard Singer (Bryan Marshall) and they become engaged. Gerard was older than Rosemary and she hoped he would hit it off with Helen. When Rosemary introduced them, they became attracted to one another. While Rosemary was away in New York, Gerard followed Helen to Erinsborough and declared his love for her. Gerard then told Rosemary that he was leaving her because he was in love with another woman, but wouldn't say who. Rosemary later discovered love letters written by him to Helen. Rosemary was devastated and cut off contact with Helen. However, shortly before she returned to New York, Rosemary decided to forgive her mother after Jim (Alan Dale) stepped into help.

=== Returns ===
Chambers made a brief return in 2005, after line producer Linda Walker emailed her asking if she would return; one of several past actors invited to return for the 20th anniversary celebrations. She shot her scenes in April on a visit to Melbourne. Chambers "blended straight back in with the regular cast" during filming Rosemary's return story. Chambers was happy to return to the role and told Jason Herbison from All About Soap that "I thought the reunion after all these years was such a lovely idea."

In May 2010, it was announced that Chambers would be reprising the role of Rosemary. Chambers made a brief stopover in Melbourne to film her scenes. She began appearing from 6 July 2010 as part of Neighbours' 25th anniversary.

Following Chambers' death, Rosemary was killed off-screen in May 2024.

== Storylines ==
Rosemary is the biological daughter of Heather Ambrose (Judith Graham). She is adopted by Bill and Helen Daniels, after Helen learns she cannot have any more children following the birth of their daughter Anne. Rosemary and Anne are opposites; Anne is interested in having a family and she marries Jim, while Rosemary decides to pursue a career and see the world. After a romantic fling with a business partner ends badly, Rosemary leaves for New York, where she sets up the Daniels Corporation.

The Daniels Corporation becomes extremely successful and Rosemary comes back to Erinsborough to set up an Australian division. Rosemary makes her nephew Paul Robinson (Stefan Dennis) manager of the company and he begins making it a success in Australia and overseeing the take over of the Lassiter's Hotel chain. Helen falls for Rosemary's lover, Gerard Singer. Rosemary is devastated after discovering love letters from Gerard to her mother. When an old school friend of Rosemary's dies, Rosemary comes back for the funeral and is shocked to find that her friend had requested that Rosemary adopt her daughter, Tracey Dawson. As the two get to know each other, they realise that they have things in common and Tracey agrees to go to America with Rosemary.

Rosemary sleeps with married man Colin Burke (Robert Alexander), the husband of her mother's neighbour Dorothy (Maggie Dence). She later tells Helen that she would not have got involved with Colin if she had known he was married. Rosemary returns again for a visit and on her arrival, she discovers her brother in law, Jim, dead on the kitchen floor. Rosemary is not the first person to discover Jim, as his mistress Fiona Hartman (Suzanne Dudley) had been with him when he died. Rosemary is shocked to find that Helen had been thrown out of her home by Fiona and went to confront her. Fiona transfers all of Jim's money into her name and she lets Rosemary go into the kitchen to find him. Rosemary then tells the rest of the family about Jim's death. Rosemary invites Helen to stay with her in New York, but Helen declines and Rosemary leaves alone. Helen rings Rosemary a few months later for advice after finding out that Julie was not Jim's daughter and if Rosemary knew.

Helen and Gaby Willis (Rachel Blakely) go into business together and Helen asks for Rosemary's help. Rosemary becomes part of the business and plans to buy back Lassiter's and the Daniels Corporation into the family. She convinces Cheryl Stark (Caroline Gillmer) to sell her shares and she begins making plans to launch a new Lassiter's Hotel in Darwin. Following Julie Martin's (Julie Mullins) death, Rosemary invites Julie's stepdaughter, Debbie (Marnie Reece-Wilmore) to join her in New York. Rosemary falls for her personal assistant, Joel Supple (Bruce Hughes), and he comes to join her in Erinsborough. Rosemary is embarrassed by the age gap, but Helen gives Rosemary her blessing. The relationship ends when Debbie and Joel fall in love and begin an affair. Rosemary suffers a nervous breakdown when she finds out.

Rosemary is left heartbroken when Helen dies and she returns to Erinsborough for the funeral. Rosemary admits to Philip Martin (Ian Rawlings) that she feels guilty about not coming back sooner, but Philip tells her that Helen knew how much she loved her. On the eve of Helen's funeral, Rosemary makes her peace with Debbie. A year later, Rosemary returns and escorts Philip's youngest daughter and Debbie's sister Hannah Martin (Rebecca Ritters) on a trip to France.

Rosemary Is one of many ex-Ramsay Street residents invited back for Annalise Hartman's (Kimberley Davies) documentary about the street in 2005. Rosemary returns to Erinsborough when Paul at his lowest ebb, following his leg being amputated after a fall. Rosemary makes him an offer to buy back Lassiter's, which he declines. She then urges him to give something back to the community, before leaving once more.

Five years later, Diana Marshall (Jane Badler) arrives in Erinsborough to check up on Paul on behalf of the Daniels Corporation. A few days later, Diana sets up a video conference on her laptop with Rosemary, who is in New York. Diana tells Rosemary that she has evidence that Paul has been embezzling money from Lassiter's into Pirate Net. Diana suggests that they remove Paul from the business, but Rosemary tells her that could reflect badly on the company. She suggests that Paul was probably just fixing a temporary cash flow problem. Rosemary tells Diana to wait and to keep her updated. A few weeks later, Diana calls Rosemary again and tells her that she has secured a deal to sell PirateNet. She tells Rosemary that she has done the deal to protect Paul and Rosemary tells her that she is grateful. Diana then tells Rosemary that she thinks it is important that she stays on, but Rosemary tells her she will book her a flight home. Paul tells Rosemary about his marriage problems over the phone and she lets him take six months away from Lassiter's. Rosemary tells Paul that she will let Diana stay on, but Paul tells her he has arranged for Declan Napier (Erin Mullally) to run the business. Paul sets up a video call with Rosemary and tells her that Diana is planning something. Rosemary says that Diana should be on her way home and that she sent her to help. Rosemary reveals that she knows about Paul's embezzlement, shocking him. Paul tells her that he thinks Diana is going to stage a coup, and Rosemary says that they must act fast. Paul later reveals to Diana that Rosemary has fired her. Fifteen years later, Paul tells his son Leo Tanaka (Tim Kano) that his sister, Lucy Robinson (Melissa Bell) has informed him that Rosemary has died.

== Reception ==
Ruth Deller of television website Lowculture called for Rosemary's return in a feature about how to get the magic back into Neighbours. Deller said "Bring back some of the past characters, either for guest stints, or long-term. Although don't go mad on this one. Top of our list would be Lucy Robinson, Rosemary Daniels for her obligatory every other year visit and the Alessi twins". In a separate feature, Deller called Rosemary a "business-lady-extraordinaire".

British satellite broadcasting company, Sky called Rosemary one of "the last remaining links back to proper old school Neighbours" along with Lou Carpenter and Paul Robinson. They also called her the Belinda Slater of Ramsay Street. The BBC said that Rosemary's most notable moment was when she "discovered that her fiancée Gerard Singer dumped her for her mother Helen."
