= Eli Baker =

Eli Baker may refer to:

- Eli Baker, actor in Growing Up Fisher
- Eli Baker, fictional character in Neighbours
