= Diana Marshall =

Fictional character in Neighbours

- Neighbours character
- Portrayed by: Jane Badler
- First appearance: 22 June 2010
- Last appearance: 20 September 2010
- Introduced by: Susan Bower
In-universe information
- Occupation: Businesswoman

Diana Marshall is a fictional character from the Australian soap opera Neighbours, played by Jane Badler. She made her first screen appearance during the episode broadcast on 22 June 2010. Badler had a four-month contract with the show and she began filming her first scenes in April following a successful audition. Badler revealed that the writers are fans of the 1983 television miniseries V, which she starred in, and wrote the role of Diana with her in mind. They named the character Diana in a homage to the role she played in the show. The character departed on 20 September 2010.

Diana is an ambitious, driven businesswoman who works for Lassiter's International. She arrives in Erinsborough from New York on a business trip and decides to try to take control of the company. She also wants to get revenge on the former lover who broke her heart, Paul Robinson (Stefan Dennis). Diana wants to get to the top, but Paul stands in her way as his place within the company is secure. However, Diana discovers that Paul has been embezzling money and uses this to get what she wants. Diana clashes with many of the other Erinsborough residents and she is not well liked. She is described as a "villainess", a "dangerous femme fatale" and a woman on a mission. Diana sleeps with Paul, despite the fact that he is married and she becomes a suspect following an attempt on his life. Badler and Diana were well received by critics.

== Character creation and casting ==
In March 2010, it was announced that Badler had joined the cast of Neighbours as "super-bitch" Diana Marshall. Badler said that when she met with the writers, they told her that they are big fans of V and so they wrote the part of Diana with her in mind. They named the character Diana in a homage to the role she played in V. The writers did not know that Badler was living in the county until a chance meeting brought them together. Badler revealed that the guitarist in her band managed to connect her to Neighbours' executive producer, Susan Bower and when she tried to get her music featured on the show, she was asked to play Diana instead. Badler said that she still had to audition for the role, which she said was "depressing" as she hates auditioning. However, she said it was fun as the part was for a bad girl, which is the kind of role she enjoys playing. She added "Now I'm happy that I had to earn the role; I feel as though it was made for me."

Badler had a four-month guest contract with the show and she began filming her first scenes in April which were due to air in June 2010. Badler admitted that filming her first scenes were hard and she "could not get it together". She said "I noticed a few of the other new people. They all went through the same thing, where you have a day where you just go, 'Wow, I can't seem to function!'". Badler also said that occasionally there were no rehearsals and that it was "very daunting" and challenging. She added that the cast were "really nice" and that she got used to the quick pace of filming. Badler's debut episode aired on 22 June 2010. When Badler was asked if the door would be left open for Diana to return, she said "Oh yes, absolutely. I was contracted for four months and the way that it ended is very up in the air and I'm sure that they will use me whenever they need to shake things up a bit, you know".

== Character development ==
=== Characterisation ===
"This glamorous, sophisticated woman is a world away from the devious ways of Natasha or even past Erinsborough vixen Izzy Hoyland. Make no mistake – Diana Marshall is a woman who gets her way every time, no matter what it takes or who she has to take down to do so."

— A writer for TV Soap on the character of Diana.

Before Diana made her first appearance, she was being described as being a "mega bitch", an "Erinsborough villainess" and a "manipulative businesswoman." Diana is a dangerous femme fatale, who is "beautiful, sexy and strong". TV Soap said she is a woman on a mission. Badler described her character's background saying she had a dysfunctional upbringing, which made her strong and a fighter. Diana has had to fight for everything in her life, so she works hard in order to survive. Badler added in an interview with Network Ten that Diana is highly ambitious and very driven, which makes her kind of like a man. Diana is one of the chiefs of Lassiter's International, but she knows that she will not get to the top of the company because Paul Robinson (Stefan Dennis) is the heir to the Robinson fortune.

Diana arrives in Erinsborough from New York, on a business trip and she decides that she wants to try to take control of the company. Diana clashes with many other Erinsborough residents and she is not well liked because she is abrupt and does not hide her ambition to bring people down. Diana can be very charming and this hides the fact that she is looking after herself and her interests. Of this, Badler said "She is the smiling assassin, but she's irresistible as she has the wit, the brain and the moves to get away with it!" To go with her job and personality, Diana has a glamorous wardrobe, which Badler said is the complete opposite of hers. Badler explained that Diana is more conservative as she wears much beige, silver and grey, with Cartier watches. She added "There are many power suits and stilettos!"

=== Relationship with Paul Robinson ===
As well as trying to take over Lassiter's, Diana also wants to "settle a score with Paul Robinson". Paul stands in her way of achieving her goal as his place within the company is secure for life as Diana's boss, Rosemary Daniels (Joy Chambers), is Paul's aunt. Badler explained that Diana resents Paul as she is not part of his family and knows that she cannot ever be at the top. Further to that, Paul and Diana were once lovers and Diana fell in love with him, but he walked out on her and broke her heart. Stefan Dennis said that Paul and Diana's relationship came at a time when Paul was "a philandering playboy and didn't care." Paul became one of a few men that Diana has ever fallen in love with and because he treated her badly, she decides to bring him down. Badler said that Diana has been keeping an eye on Paul and knows everything about what he has been up to. Following her arrival, Diana begins to make Paul's life "a nightmare" and Badler said "Diana's back to force him to fall in love with her again, or destroy him – whichever comes first".

Diana uses Paul's son and stepson to help her plan along. Declan Napier (Erin Mullally) gives Diana inside info about Paul embezzling as he believes he is doing the right thing. Andrew Robinson (Jordan Smith) tries to bond with Diana by giving her company information and Diana discovers the extent of Paul's money problems and knows that she has enough details to ruin him. Paul realises that Diana knows the truth and offers to join forces with her to bring down Rosemary instead. Diana becomes friends with Paul's wife, Rebecca (Jane Hall), and she realises that she can "shatter Paul's marriage" as Rebecca does not suspect anything is wrong. Badler said "There is all this history between Paul and Diana and now they seem to be dancing around each other. There's every chance they could catch fire again. Diana is so charming and when people meet her they think she is lovely – but she really is not. And that's what makes her even more of a superbitch."

Diana asks Paul to prove to her how far he is prepared to go to create an alliance between them and to prove his loyalty he proposes that they sleep together. Diana suspects that Paul is not being genuine, but Paul insists that he is and describes Rebecca as "collateral damage." Paul believes that sleeping with Diana is the only option he has got to keep her on side. Dennis added that Paul feels guilty when he takes off his wedding ring and terrible about betraying Rebecca. Badler said that the situation is an "ego thing" for Diana and afterwards she makes it clear that her plans to destroy Paul have not changed. Badler said she enjoyed working with Stefan Dennis and said he is "fantastic" and that she felt comfortable with him. She said "I kind of felt like it was a well-played tennis match – every time you zing him something, he zings it right back. He's right there for you, so I absolutely loved working with him.

=== Who Pushed P.R? ===
In July 2010, it was revealed that the 6000th episode of Neighbours would see Paul pushed from the mezzanine of Lassiter's Hotel. This then kicks off a whodunit storyline with Diana being one of six suspects. Susan Bower said that as the Neighbours team was developing the storyline, they decided to add to the story that Paul's financial situation leads to him embezzling, which in turn leads to Diana arriving. Badler said it was "great" to be involved in the storyline and said she was largely featured in the 6000th episode. Diana becomes a suspect in the attempt on Paul's life because he jilts her "in the boardroom and the bedroom". Paul then humiliates Diana and sends her packing from Lassiter's. On Diana's reason to kill Paul, Badler said "Seeing her name splashed across the Erinsborough News prompts Diana to pull out all the stops in order to bring Paul down. And she still has friends in high places!" Diana is seen placing a call asking for something to be taken care of and she hands money over to a stranger just before Paul is pushed. Following the attempt on Paul's life, Diana's earring is found at the scene and the police manage to catch her at the airport before she returns to America. Diana diverts the police attention to Rebecca by telling them that she revealed Paul's affair to her.

== Storylines ==
Declan Napier calls Diana to tell her that some money has gone missing from the Lassiter's Hotel account and Diana arrives in Erinsborough. She goes to Charlie's for a drink and Declan calls her and says that the situation with the money was down to a software glitch. Diana see Paul Robinson arrive and she goes over to him. Paul introduces her to Declan and Diana tells him that if there is any dirt to be found on Paul, she will find it. Paul later introduces Diana to his son, Andrew, and his wife, Rebecca. Rebecca invites Diana for dinner and Diana asks to meet Declan to discuss why he called her. Diana reveals to Declan that she knows that Paul has been embezzling money from the company. Andrew becomes jealous of Declan and Diana's bond and he gives Diana some of Paul's financial papers when he tells her about his business idea. Diana calls Rosemary Daniels and tells her that she has evidence of Paul's embezzlement. Rosemary asks Diana to keep her updated on the situation. Paul asks Diana to join him in taking over the company and to prove his loyalty, he goes to Diana's hotel room and sleeps with her. Diana hides a camera in the room and after Paul leaves she checks the tape, but finds Paul has wiped the footage. Diana tries to sabotage an event being held at Rebecca's bar, by taking all of the security for a conference at Lassiter's. Declan pleads with Diana to help his mother out, but Kate Ramsay (Ashleigh Brewer) solves the problem instead.

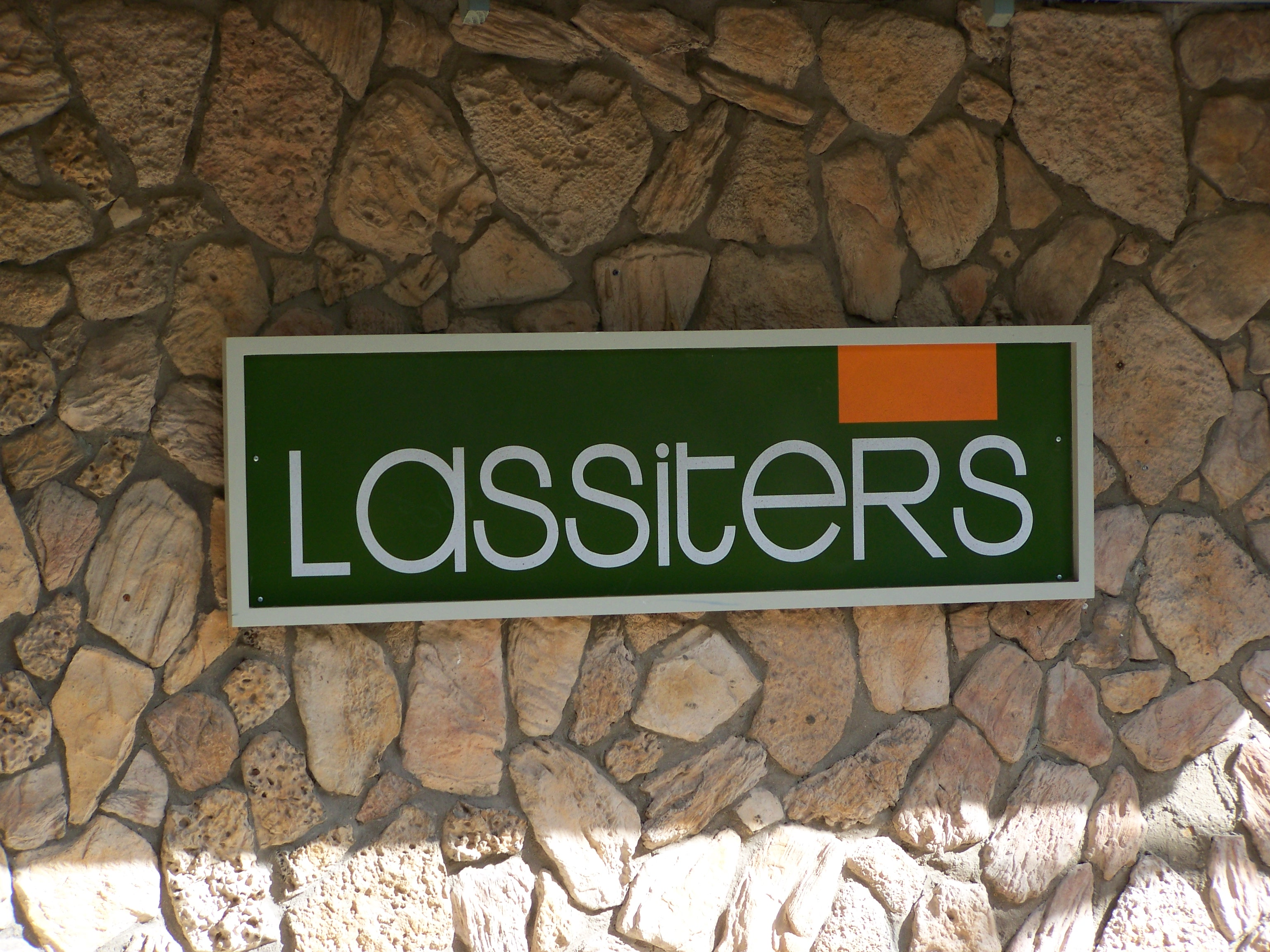
Diana arrives in Erinsborough to try to take over the Lassiter's company.

Diana asks Paul's lawyer, Toadfish Rebecchi (Ryan Moloney), to work for her in bringing Paul down and he agrees. Diana discovers that Paul is blackmailing Toadie into covering up his embezzlement. Paul tells Diana that he has sold PirateNet and that his money troubles will soon be over, before giving her cab fare to the airport. Diana tells Rosemary that she was the one who secured the deal to sell PirateNet and that she did the deal to protect Paul. Rosemary is grateful and tells Diana that she will book her a flight home. Diana asks Paul to come to her hotel room and she tries to seduce him, but he pushes her away. Diana tells him that she is not going anywhere and that she will take everything from him. Paul goads Diana when she comes into Charlie's, he tells her that it was fun crushing her and Diana throws her drink in Paul's face. Diana is about to go home, when she hears that Paul has decided to put Declan in charge of Lassiter's for six months, so he can spend more time with his family. Diana asks Declan to help her bring Paul and Rosemary down and he agrees. Diana begins calling the board members in the hope that she can persuade them to vote Rosemary and Paul out. Paul discovers that Toadie and Declan are working against him and he tells Rosemary about Diana's plan. Diana goes to Declan's office and finds Paul waiting for her. He tells her that her plan has not worked and that Rosemary has fired her.

Diana discovers that Paul has written a story about her in his newspaper and she confronts him. Diana tells him that she will receive many job offers in New York, but Paul says that no one will be interested as she is toxic. Diana's plane ticket is cancelled and she is thrown out of the hotel by Paul. She asks Declan for help and he tells her that Paul keeps his business papers in the home safe. Diana kisses Paul, and at the same time she takes his house keys from his pocket and she breaks into his house. Diana does not find anything and, in anger, she smashes Paul's possessions. Diana calls a mystery person and arranges for them to hurt Paul. She then goes to Rebecca and tells her about her husband's affair. Someone goes to the Lassiter's mezzanine and pushes Paul from it. Detective Mark Brennan (Scott McGregor) discovers one of Diana's earrings at the scene and he stops her at the airport. During questioning, Diana tells him to speak to Rebecca again after revealing her affair with Paul. Andrew, Summer Hoyland (Jordy Lucas) and Natasha Williams (Valentina Novakovic) follow Diana and see her meeting with Jack Ward (Peter Lowrey), a hitman she called on the night Paul was pushed. Natasha retrieves Jack's phone and the group listen to a message left by Diana, telling him to leave town. Andrew confronts Diana at her hotel and Mark arrives to arrest her for conspiracy to commit murder. Susan Kennedy (Jackie Woodburne) receives some emails telling her that Diana did not push Paul and she goes to see her. Diana tells Susan that she has been formally charged, but insists that she is innocent. She realises that Susan believes her and she begs Susan to help. Diana is later released.

After Paul wakes up and mentions that he argued with Diana, an anonymous caller informs Diana of what Paul said and she begins packing. Mark and his team arrive at her hotel, but they find the room is empty. Diana goes to the hospital to see Paul, he tries to call for help, but he is too weak. Diana tells him that she did not push him, but if she did, he would be in the morgue. She asks him to tell the truth and do the right thing, before leaving through the side entrance of the room.

== Reception ==
Badler's co-star, Mullally, praised her appearance in Neighbours. He said that "she has so much intensity on screen and sometimes she'll throw in some interesting comedy as well". He added "She is great to work with, so beautiful, really happy and chirpy. And when she goes on screen she plays this callous, powerful, intimidating persona and her eyes just go straight through you!" TV Week said that they have been "desperate" to see Neighbours cast a new female villain and that their prayers had been answered when Badler joined the cast as Diana.

Television critic, Andrew Mercado, said that Neighbours had made its "best casting decision in years" when they asked Badler to join the show. He hoped that she would be around for a while and he added the show "desperately needs a bitch right now". Mercado later compared Diana and Paul to Australia's Prime Minister Julia Gillard and her predecessor Kevin Rudd. He said "Arrogant men rarely see wily women sneaking up from behind to stab them in the back. Kevin Rudd has just been forced to stand aside as Australian Prime Minister to avoid an embarrassing defeat at the hands of Deputy Leader Julia Gillard and now Neighbours' Paul Robinson could be the next to go with a celebrated 80's superbitch infiltrating Ramsay Street". Ruth Deller of television website Lowculture said Diana was a "fabulous plot device".
