= List of Neighbours characters introduced in 2010 =

The following is a list of characters who first appeared in the Australian soap opera Neighbours during 2010, they are listed in order of their first appearance. They were all introduced by the show's executive producer, Susan Bower. The 26th season of Neighbours began airing on 11 January 2010. Comedian Peter Moon joined the cast as theatre producer Terry Kearney in February. That same month saw Chris Pappas, the show's first regular, gay male character, make his debut. Established character, Donna Freedman's father, Nick Nixon joined in April and two new regular characters, Michael and Natasha Williams, began appearing from May. Former V actress, Jane Badler joined the show in June, playing businesswoman Diana Marshall. June also saw the first appearance of builder, Jim Dolan. Model and television presenter, Scott McGregor joined the cast as Detective Mark Brennan towards the end of August. Gabriella Darlington and P. J. Lane made their acting debuts as Poppy Rogers and Eli Baker respectively. From December, Gemma Pranita began appearing as established character Sonya Mitchell's younger sister, Jade.

== Terry Kearney ==
Terry Kearney
- Neighbours character
- Portrayed by: Peter Moon
- First appearance: 5 February 2010
- Last appearance: 30 June 2010
- Introduced by: Susan Bower
In-universe information
- Occupation: Theatre producer

Terry Kearney, played by comedian Peter Moon, made his first screen appearance on 5 February 2010. Darren Rowe from Digital Spy reported that Moon would be the latest celebrity to guest star in Neighbours in October 2009. Moon had previously auditioned for the soap twenty years ago when he hoped to be cast as Harold Bishop. Terry is a flamboyant English theatre producer. He departed on 30 June 2010 after accepting a job on a cruise ship.

When Kate Ramsay (Ashleigh Brewer) decides that she needs to get a paid dancing job to help support her family, she auditions for a show created by Terry. Terry likes Kate and thinks she has got talent, but the lead dancer, Candace Carey (Sheona Urquhart), disagrees and thinks Kate is not experienced enough. Terry overrules her and gives the part to Kate. When Terry watches a rehearsal he decides that Kate is the better dancer and makes her the lead. When Kate injures her ankle, Terry is forced to give the lead back to Candace. During the opening show, Kate convinces him that she'll be able to dance and Terry gives tells Candace that Kate is the lead again, this angers Candace and she pushes Kate on stage. Terry, who witnessed the push, sacks Candace after the show. Kate later meets with Terry at Charlie's, so she can ask him to give Candace her job back. Terry is shocked, but Kate tells him that if she is going to be a professional she has to learn how to deal with people like Candace.

When Kate needs some more dance work, she calls Terry and asks if he can help her put on a show at Charlie's bar for some business people. Following the end of the dance, Kate is offered some work and tells Terry that she will not take the job out of loyalty to him. Terry then encourages her to take the job, telling her he will be fine. Kate invites Terry to Harold's Store and asks Terry to talk to Ben Fitzgerald (Blake O'Leary) about dancing. Terry tells him not to become a dancer, he then sees Lyn Scully (Janet Andrewartha) and hurries outside to tidy up his appearance. Kate decides to set Terry up with Lou Carpenter (Tom Oliver), so they can become friends. Terry and Lou are shocked and Terry is unhappy, he then tells Kate that he likes Lyn. Terry gets Kate to invite him to Toadfish Rebecchi (Ryan Moloney) and Stephanie Scully's (Carla Bonner) wedding reception and he tries to talk to Lyn, but she ignores him. Karl Kennedy (Alan Fletcher) tells Terry not to try and date her. Lyn later agrees to go on a date with Terry and he takes her rock climbing, which she enjoys. Terry tells Lyn that he has been offered a job on a cruise ship for a few months. He then asks her to go with him and she says yes. However, she later changes her mind and asks Terry if they can stay friends. Terry asks Kate if she will take over the dance troupe for him and she agrees. Terry then leaves after a small send off from some of the neighbours.

== Candace Carey ==
Candace Carey
- Neighbours character
- Portrayed by: Sheona Urquhart
- First appearance: 5 February 2010
- Last appearance: 17 August 2010
- Introduced by: Susan Bower
In-universe information
- Occupation: Dancer

Candace Carey, played by Sheona Urquhart, made her first screen appearance on 5 February 2010. Candace is a dancer who competes with Kate Ramsay (Ashleigh Brewer) for the lead in Terry Kearney's (Peter Moon) show. In August 2010, following the breakup of Declan Napier (Erin Mullally) and Kate's relationship, Candace shares a kiss with Declan. She arrives at Charlie's to perform a dance routine for a bucks night and makes it clear she has been attracted to Declan for some time. Mullally said "Candace gets talking to Declan and is there for him, he wants comfort and makes that split-second decision to kiss her". Mullally adds that Declan cannot believe what he did and does not want to pursue a relationship with Candace.

When Kate Ramsay auditions for Terry Kearney's dance troupe, Candace becomes jealous of her dancing ability and tries to humiliate her in front of the other dancers. After seeing a rehearsal Terry decides to give the lead to Kate, which angers Candace. Candace later comes to Charlie's with some friends and Kate goes to talk to her, Candace tells Kate that she is big enough to admit that Kate was the better dancer. However, it becomes apparent that Candace is lying to Kate. The next day Candace hides Kate's dance shoes and when Kate falls over during a dress rehearsal, Kate realises that Candace has sabotaged her shoes. Kate manages to make it to the opening night and Candace has to give the lead back to her. During the dance Candace tries to bump Kate offstage, which Terry sees from the wings. After the show Kate confronts Candace and tells Terry that she was pushed. Terry takes Kate's side and fires Candace, who wonders how she is going to support her child now. Kate, feeling guilty upon hearing that Candace is a single mother, meets with Terry and asks him to give Candace her job back. Kate later sees Candace at the Store and Candace tells her she is back and will be the lead again.

Kate complains that she has not had any dance work for a while and she runs into Candace. Candace tells her that she has got a new dance job at a club and takes a phone call about it in front of Kate. Kate watches Candace write an address down and later turns up at the audition. Candace tells Kate to leave and that the job is not for her. Kate and Candace both dance in the production and Kate is offered some more work later that night. Candace comes to Charlie's to warn Kate not to turn up for the job, but Kate refuses to listen. Candace also tells her that she knows what Kate did for her. When Kate turns up for the job, she is shocked to discover that the job is at a lap dancing club. When Terry is offered a job on a cruise ship, he tells Kate to take over the dance troupe. Candace is unhappy when she finds out that Kate has not booked many dance jobs for the group and refuses to teach Ben Fitzgerald (Blake O'Leary) and Callum Jones (Morgan Baker) some new dance moves. However, Candace turns up at the Kennedys' house to teach the children and she tells Kate that she enjoyed herself. For Ringo Brown's (Sam Clark) bucks night, Zeke Kinski (Matthew Werkmeister) hires Candace and two other dancers for the entertainment. Candace is surprised to see Declan and they later share a drink together. Declan tells her that he and Kate split up and she asks if he wants to go get some air. They go up to the roof of Lassiter's and Kate sees them sharing a kiss.

== Chris Pappas ==
Chris Pappas, played by James Mason, made his first on-screen appearance on 25 February 2010. The character of Chris is Mason's first major professional television role. Chris is a student at Erinsborough High who befriends Andrew Robinson, Summer Hoyland and Harry Ramsay. In August 2010, it was announced that the character would reveal he is gay to his friends. He is the show's first on-going gay male character in 25 years.

== Doug Harris ==
Doug Harris
- Neighbours character
- Portrayed by: Mahesh Jadu
- Duration: 2010–2011
- First appearance: 9 March 2010
- Last appearance: 18 February 2011
- Introduced by: Susan Bower
In-universe information
- Occupation: Doctor
- Nieces: Bryony Harris

Doug Harris, played by Mahesh Jadu, made his first screen appearance on 9 March 2010. Doug is a doctor at Erinsborough hospital. Perth-born actor Jadu auditioned for the role of Doug after being contacted by casting director, Lou Mitchell. He initially signed a six-month contract with Neighbours, with a view to an extension if the role proved popular with viewers. The character and casting was announced in February 2010 and a writer for TV Week said "Jadu is set to join the popular soap in a recurring guest role, playing hot new doctor Doug Harris. Insiders say that as well as butting heads with Dr Karl Kennedy, Doug will also enjoy a romance with a local lass". A TV Soap reporter also commented on the new doctor, saying "Dr Doug will [..] find himself caught up in a new romance", but they did not name the female character involved. They also called him a "hot doc". Jadu stated that Doug may appear to be abrupt, but when he is under pressure, he does all he can to look after his patients. He described his character as "fiercely independent, showing no signs of truly settling down anytime soon". A writer from What's on TV called Doug "extremely good-looking and more than a little bit arrogant". Describing Doug's relationship with Karl Kennedy (Alan Fletcher), Jadu said "Dr Harris and Dr Kennedy are in a constant stand off, both in and out of work. While they're different people, they step on each other's toes professionally and encroach on each other's personal territory also. Jadu suspected that they both admire each other's talent.

After Karl Kennedy suffers a health scare he is treated by Doug. Karl clashes with Doug over his diagnosis and how long he has been waiting for treatment. Karl gets his job back at the hospital and Doug becomes his boss. Doug treats a pregnant Stephanie Scully (Carla Bonner) when she is brought in with stomach pains. He also tells her the baby's gender. When Libby Kennedy (Kym Valentine) goes to drop off her son, Ben (Blake O'Leary), at his dance class, Doug steals her parking place. Libby confronts him, but he tells her she waited too long. Libby retaliates by taking a cupcake that Doug was going to buy at Harold's Store. Doug apologises and asks her out for a drink. Libby is forced to cut the date short when she has to take a drunk Sonya Mitchell (Eve Morey) home. Days later, Libby runs into Doug and Jodie Smith (Mary Annegeline) and initially believes they are out on a date. Doug and Libby go out again and they get on well. The date ends early when Karl calls Doug back to the hospital. When Libby goes to the hospital to drop off Karl's pager, she and Doug go into a room and start kissing. Karl then walks in on them and argues with Doug.

When someone steals a set of hospital records, Karl believes it was Donna Freedman (Margot Robbie). He asks Doug not to call the police, so he can have a chance to talk to her. However, Doug ignores him and Donna is arrested. Libby berates Doug for his actions. Libby and Doug go to Charlie's for dinner and Lucas Fitzgerald (Scott Major) and Michael Williams (Sandy Winton) join them. Lucas asks Doug to tell them some stories from the hospital, but Doug refuses. Libby feels humiliated and tells Doug to leave, saying she does not want him back. Doug then goes on leave. Upon his return, he treats Paul Robinson (Stefan Dennis), who has fallen from the Lassiter's mezzanine. Doug tells Paul's wife Rebecca (Jane Hall) that he has placed Paul in a coma. When Paul wakes, Doug is unhappy when Mark Brennan (Scott McGregor) begins questioning him. Doug treats both Steph and Ringo Brown (Sam Clark) following a road side accident and tells Donna that Ringo has died. Libby takes Steph to see Doug about getting treatment for depression. Doug tells Libby that he admires her for helping Steph. Doug later gives evidence at Steph's court case. Doug treats Andrew Robinson (Jordan Patrick Smith) when he is brought in following a fire at Number 26 and takes blood from Natasha Williams (Valentina Novakovic), when she explains that she has been feeling ill.

== Nick Nixon ==
Nick Nixon
- Neighbours character
- Portrayed by: Brian Vriends
- Duration: 2010–2011
- First appearance: 9 April 2010
- Last appearance: 26 January 2011
- Introduced by: Susan Bower
In-universe information
- Occupation: Essendon AFL player Restaurant owner
- Wife: Carmen
- Daughters: Donna Freedman

Leigh "Nick" Nixon, played by Brian Vriends, made his first appearance on 9 April 2010. The character and casting details were announced on 2 December 2009. Vriends signed on for a "lengthy" guest role. He was perhaps best known for his role as Ben Markham in All Saints at the time. Fiona Byrne and Alice Coster of the Herald Sun pointed out that he had not made a "long-term commitment" to a drama series since leaving All Saints. Vriends reiterated this, stating "It's quite exciting, I haven't had an ongoing role in years." Nick is the father of established character Donna Freedman (Margot Robbie). Executive producer Susan Bower promised that there would be a "must see" storyline for both actors, adding "The Freedman family have provided fantastic drama for us so far and we have lots in store for Brian, it's great to have him with us". Nick arrives in Ramsay Street under a cloud of suspicion.

When Donna's mother Cassandra Freedman (Tottie Goldsmith) reveals that Matt Freedman is not her biological father, Donna begins a search for the man who is. While sorting through some boxes from her Grandmother's house, Donna finds Cassandra's diary and with the help of her friends, tries to discover who might be her father. They manage to narrow the search down to two men called Nick, a university lecturer and an ex-football player. Donna then sends letters to both men asking if they could be her father. She receives a reply from the football player, Leigh "Nick" Nixon and arranges to meet him, however, she cannot go through with the meeting and he leaves. Donna goes to his restaurant and calling herself Kelly, asks him for a job. When Donna spots Nick kissing a member of staff, she quits her job and accuses him of cheating on his wife. Nick later explains that his wife is dead. Donna then tells him that she might be his daughter. Nick shows Donna a box of items that he saved for her and Donna asks him to take a DNA test. Donna gets the results of the test back and reveals that Nick is her father.

When Donna is injured following an accident at a building site, Nick rushes to the hospital after receiving a call from Rebecca Robinson (Jane Hall). Nick thanks Rebecca and Paul Robinson (Stefan Dennis) for looking after Donna and he tries to keep Ringo Brown (Sam Clark) away from her. Ringo confronts Nick and Nick tells him that he does not want Donna getting hurt again, Ringo then explains that he loves Donna. Ringo and Donna later get back together, but Donna tells Ringo that she would like Nick's approval of their relationship first and Nick gives them his blessing. Ringo then decides to propose to Donna and Nick tells them that they are too young and Donna rejects Ringo. Nick and Donna argue and she later decides to propose to Ringo herself. Nick tells them that he will support them and he shakes Ringo's hand. In the buildup to the wedding, Nick meets Ringo's mother, Prue (Penny Cook). They do not get on and argue with each other. Donna and Ringo ask them to be nice and when Donna goes to see Prue, she discovers Nick in Prue's hotel room. Prue and Nick explain that they no longer dislike each other and that they ended up together in the room to talk. On the day of the wedding Nick tells Donna that their car has broken down. They get a lift with Lucas Fitzgerald (Scott Major), but are stopped by the police. They eventually arrive at the venue and Nick gives Donna away. Nick comes to see Donna and Ringo when they get back from their honeymoon. Donna asks her father to help her take over Charlie's while Rebecca spends her time at the hospital with Paul. Nick returns to town to comfort Donna after Ringo dies. When Donna's car breaks down on the way to the funeral, Nick tells her that he will come and get her. However, Donna tells him to go to the service to represent her. Nick visits Donna and she tells him that she is going to New York because she got into a design school. She asks him to look at her designs and he tells her that he dislikes them. Donna then decides not to go to New York and Nick and her friends try to persuade her to change her mind. Donna later tells Nick and Susan Kennedy (Jackie Woodburne) that she is scared of letting Ringo down. Donna changes her mind again and Nick tells her that he will come with her for a few weeks.

== Naomi Lord ==
Naomi Lord
- Neighbours character
- Portrayed by: Kate Bell
- First appearance: 24 April 2010
- Last appearance: 25 May 2010
- Introduced by: Susan Bower
In-universe information
- Occupation: Eden University student

Naomi Lord, played by former Home and Away actress Kate Bell, made her first appearance on 24 April 2010. Naomi was a new love interest for Ringo Brown (Sam Clark), who treats her after she collapses outside Harold's Store. It was reported that Ringo would fall for Naomi, however, she soon shows a different side to her character. A Neighbours spokesperson said of Naomi "She quickly reveals her true colours. And the consequences could be devastating for another favourite". Network Ten describe Naomi as "Giving Glenn Close a run for her money in a Fatal Attraction-style-storyline" Of her character Bell said "She's a complex character. The guys totally fall for her vulnerability which is all an act, but the girls have her worked out straight away". Bob Hart and Leigh Paatsch of the Herald Sun observed "trouble is being fomented by the unlovely Naomi, who has settled in with Ringo, taking over from the much lovelier Donna". Cameron Adams from the same newspaper also commented on the "tumultuous love triangle" and branded Naomi "some blow-in strumpet".

Naomi is treated by paramedic Ringo Brown after she goes into Anaphylactic shock outside Harold's Store. Ringo later visits her in hospital to check she is okay and Naomi steals his ID badge. Naomi turns up at the university sports day and Ringo begins to fall for her. When Ringo tells her that he is spending the day with the guys, she appears unhappy. She later steals a fuse from their hangout, which cuts the power supply and forces Ringo and the others to go to Charlie's, where Naomi meets up with them. Naomi invites Ringo to see a movie and the other teens decide to go too, Naomi appears unhappy that Donna Freedman (Margot Robbie) is going. Naomi texts Zeke Kinski (Matthew Werkmeister) from Ringo's phone telling him that she and Ringo are not going. They later meet the others at Harold's Store and Donna tells Naomi not to worry about her being Ringo's ex-girlfriend. Naomi tells Ringo that Donna was mean to her and he tells Donna to stay away from him and Naomi. In a bid to make Donna look jealous of her and Ringo, Naomi pays Bradley Hewson (Liam McIntyre) to pretend to be her brother. When Donna sees them together, she tells Ringo that Naomi is cheating on him. Naomi invites Ringo over to her house for a spa. When he arrives, she undoes her bikini strap and pretends to drown, while calling out for him to help. Ringo rescues her and takes her back to the Kennedy house, where Karl Kennedy (Alan Fletcher) checks Naomi over. Karl questions Naomi about the incident and tells Ringo that he has doubts about her story. Ringo later discovers his stolen ID card in Naomi's bag and ends the relationship.

Naomi does not take the split well and asks Ringo to meet her for a drink. Ringo tells her that they are definitely over and she goes to Harold's Store in tears, where Kate Ramsay (Ashleigh Brewer) talks to her. Naomi accuses Donna of ruining her relationship and tells her to stay away from Ringo. Donna is sent a photo of Naomi and Ringo together and later, a set of photos featuring her. Donna's university project is ruined and everyone blames Naomi. Donna accidentally tells the police that Naomi is at the gym and they conclude that Naomi could not have gone to the university. A woman with blond hair runs off with Naomi's hospital records and Karl believes it is Donna. Karl confronts Donna, who tells him she was not at the hospital. The police arrive and arrest Donna for theft. Donna claims to have been framed by Naomi and Ringo sticks by her. Declan Napier (Erin Mullally) and Ringo search Naomi's house and Declan finds a shrine dedicated to Ringo. They also find the hospital records and call the police. Naomi is arrested and Ringo later has a restraining order taken out against her, which Naomi rips up. Donna is then released. Ringo receives several phone calls from a hysterical Naomi. Naomi asks Ringo to meet her, but he refuses. Ringo later finds out from Karl that Naomi was brought into the hospital after a hit and run. When Naomi wakes up, she calls out for Ringo. Naomi is then sent to the psychiatric ward. Ringo visits her, but Naomi angrily blames him for everything that happened to her.

== Michael Williams ==
Michael Williams, played by Sandy Winton, is Erinsborough High School's new principal. He made his first on-screen appearance on 4 May 2010. Michael is a single father of a teenage daughter, Natasha (Valentina Novakovic). Network Ten describe Michael as a "laconic, outdoorsy Aussie bloke in his late thirties."

== Natasha Williams ==
Natasha Williams, played by Valentina Novakovic, made her first on-screen appearance on 5 May 2010. Natasha is the teenage daughter of Erinsborough High School's principal, Michael Williams. Natasha has been described as spirited, rebellious and having a burning desire to rule the school.

== Jim Dolan ==
Jim Dolan
- Neighbours character
- Portrayed by: Scott Parmeter
- Duration: 2010–2011
- First appearance: 1 June 2010
- Last appearance: 22 August 2011
- Introduced by: Susan Bower
In-universe information
- Occupation: Builder

James "Jim" Dolan, played by Scott Parmeter, made his first on-screen appearance on 1 June 2010. Jim is a builder, who employs Ringo Brown and later rebuilds Lyn Scully's home. He is later diagnosed with cancer and Susan Kennedy supports him through his treatment.

In June 2011, it was revealed that Jim would become terminally ill and Susan Kennedy (Jackie Woodburne) grows "emotionally attached" to him. Susan feels that she needs to help Jim through his illness and Woodburne said "for a number of reasons she feels she needs to help this man, so she develops very strong emotional attachments." Susan's husband, Karl (Alan Fletcher), becomes jealous of Jim and Susan's friendship and tries to stop Susan from helping him. Susan's attachment to Jim becomes stronger and Karl warns him to stay away from her.

Jim hires Ringo Brown (Sam Clark) to work on his building site. Jim tells Ringo that he will be starting on small tasks first until he finds his feet. He then gets Ringo to do a food run. Jim is giving Ringo an OHS reminder, when Toadfish Rebecchi (Ryan Moloney) arrives to talk to him. Jim is not pleased to see Toadie and Toadie explains that he is there to make a settlement on the last job Jim did. His clients has complained that Jim's constructions were not up to standard. Jim tells Toadie that his buildings are fine and he and his crew deserve their money in full. Toadie tries to reason with Jim, but Jim takes Toadie's satchel and throws it across the site and tells him to leave. Ringo admits that Toadie is a friend and a good guy, but Jim does not believe him. Toadie returns to the site and tells Jim that his client has agreed to pay cost plus fifty percent, but Jim turns him down. Jim demands to know who Toadie's client is and Toadie tells him it is Marcus Trang. Jim explains that Marcus is the office manager and that Toadie has no idea who he is working for. He then reveals that it is Paul Robinson (Stefan Dennis), leaving Toadie shocked.

Jim gives a talk at Erinsborough High on careers day and Summer Hoyland (Jordy Lucas) asks him about fixing her home. He tells her and Lyn Scully (Janet Andrewartha) that he will give them a low quote as a job has just fallen through. Jim and his team begin work on the house. When Lyn's grandson, Charlie (Jacob Brito), finds a Blue-tongued skink, Jim tells her that it belongs to his chippy, Dylan, and he takes it back. Jim later returns and tells Lyn that Dylan wanted Charlie to have the skink back. He then offers to give Lyn a tour of the progress on her house sometime. A few months later, Susan Kennedy runs into Jim at the hospital and he asks after Lyn. He then talks to Danielle Paquette (Georgia Bolton) about a pathology referral letter he received following surgery on his back. A few days later, Susan meets up with Jim to talk about the hospital's Patient Advocacy Program for a newspaper article. Jim tells her that he originally went to the hospital to get his bad back checked out, but a melanoma was discovered too. Jim reveals that he has skin cancer and is undergoing tests and scans to find out if he has secondary cancer. Susan asks Jim if he is happy with the program and Jim says he is. Susan asks him if there is anything in particular that Jim would like in the article and Jim asks that she tells the readers to cover up before they go out in the sun. He begins to get short of breath and collapses. Susan asks someone to call an ambulance and Jim is taken to the hospital. Jim tells Susan that the cancer has spread to his lungs and liver. Jim invites Susan out to dinner and he tells her that he does not know what to do and that he wants more time. He thanks her for listening to him. Jim drops by Karl and Susan's house the next day to thank them both for their support.

Susan meets with Jim again for her article and offers to accompany him to his first treatment session, as he is worried. Rhys Lawson (Ben Barber) tells Jim that the procedure is straightforward and Susan helps take his mind off of what is happening. Karl gives Jim some advice on how to cope with his treatment. Susan takes a copy of Jim's file to see if she can get some answers for him and she later tells Jim that Karl read his chart and think his cancer has reached a point where treatment would not make any difference. Jim decides to stop his chemotherapy and reveals to Susan that it is a weight off his mind. Jim and Susan discuss what he is going to do with the time he has left. Jim gives Susan enduring power of attorney, so she can make decisions for him in regards to his health. Karl asks Jim to keep his distance from Susan for a while, but later confesses that he overreacted. Karl invites Jim round for lunch and Jim talks about Karl and Susan's upcoming holiday to Peru. Jim begins to feel unwell and collapses. He is taken to the hospital and Karl reveals he has internal bleeding caused by the cancer. Karl and Rhys save him and Karl decides to take over as his attending physician. Karl tells Jim his immune system is weak and Jim realises he will not be able to leave the hospital and see his childhood home, Susan comforts him. Jim dies in the hospital, with Rhys by his side.

The episode featuring Jim's death, which was written by Pete McTighe, was nominated for an AWGIE Award.

== Diana Marshall ==
Diana Marshall, played by American actress Jane Badler, made her first on-screen appearance on 22 June 2010. The character was created for Badler by the writers who are fans of the 1983 TV miniseries V, which Badler starred in. She has a four-month contract with the show. Diana has been described as an Erinsborough villainess, a "super-bitch" and a manipulative businesswoman. Diana is a business woman who works for the Daniel's Corporation. She arrives in Erinsborough to check up on Paul Robinson, after she discovers he has been embezzling money. She then sets about trying to bring Paul down.

== Mark Brennan ==
Mark Brennan, played by Scott McGregor, made his first on-screen appearance on 30 August 2010. Mark is a detective who arrives to investigate the attempted murder of Erinsborough resident, Paul Robinson. He receives conflicting information as everyone has their own suspicions as to who committed the crime. McGregor initially had a four-week guest contract with the show, but this was later increased to six and then twelve months. Mark also begins a relationship with Kate Ramsay (Ashleigh Brewer).

== Poppy Rogers ==
Poppy Rogers
- Neighbours character
- Portrayed by: Gabriella Darlington
- First appearance: 22 September 2010
- Last appearance: 28 October 2010
- Introduced by: Susan Bower
In-universe information
- Brothers: Bohdi Rogers
- First cousins: Ruby Rogers

Poppy Rogers, played by Gabriella Darlington, made her first on-screen appearance on 22 September 2010. Darlington was cast in the role via a competition run by British television channel Five, who broadcast Neighbours in the UK. The character has been described as a "free-spirited young woman" who met Malcolm Kennedy while backpacking around Europe. This back story was later changed.

In April 2010, it was announced that the Neighbours producers were looking for a female actress from the UK to play the role of Poppy Rogers. The search was organised by British broadcaster Five, as part of the show's 25th anniversary celebrations. Females aged 18 or over were invited to download an audition script and upload a video of themselves performing the script to YouTube. In June 2010, the competition closed and Five announced that they had received over 1500 entries. Five finalists were picked; Gabriella Darlington, Jennifer Hall, Jo Gleave, Miriam Locke-Wheaton and Olivia Kennett. The public were then invited to vote for their favourite finalist, and it was announced that the top two would fly to Melbourne for live auditions. Executive producer, Susan Bower said that during their time in Australia, the finalists would go through a camera test, wardrobe fitting, a tour around the studios and then another audition process. Bower said "It's just like any other new cast member: they're oriented to the studio". On 28 June 2010, Alan Fletcher (who plays Karl Kennedy) appeared on Live from Studio Five to announce that the two finalists were Darlington and Hall. On 16 July 2010, it was announced that Darlington had been cast in the role of Poppy. She began filming her scenes on 19 July. Darlingtion said "I can't believe how lucky I am. I never expected to be shortlisted, let alone get to Australia and win. I have had an amazing week and am really excited to start on Monday".

Poppy has been described as a "free-spirited young woman in her early 20s". Poppy grew up in a small country village in England with her hippy parents and younger brother, Bohdi. Her parents have raised both her and her brother to respect nature. Holy Soap say Poppy "takes risks at every turn and always encourages others to live the same way. She's a vegetarian, believing that every animal has a right to live, and is vocal in her opinions, which are not necessarily grounded in reality but stem from a good heart". She met and befriended Malcolm Kennedy (Benjamin McNair) and his wife Catherine (Radha Mitchell), while she was backpacking around Europe. Bower has said that Poppy will bring "fun" and "mischief" to Ramsay Street. On the character's storylines, Bower said "Obviously [she's a visitor] from the UK. Because of the perceived meddling in a storyline, [her] part in that storyline is misunderstood by a couple of the teens. That's all I can say." Fletcher said the character of Poppy is "a little bit radical and different, which will make things quite difficult for Karl". He added that Poppy changes the dynamic of the house because she is "a bit wild and wacky and that will have an unsettling effect on everyone". He also called the character "attractive" and said that there will not be a shortage of would be suitors. In July 2010, Holy Soap revealed more details of the character's arrival, they said "[Poppy] who, after hitting Erinsborough with her cousin Ruby, will make an impression on some of its finest bachelors".

Darlington later revealed that Poppy's storyline had been changed and Poppy does not go to live with the Kennedy family and her cousin get the boy's attention instead. Poppy has a lot of scenes with Valentina Novakovic (Natasha Williams), Sandy Winton (Michael Williams) and Yesse Spence (Ruby Rogers). Following the end of her appearance in Australia, Winton praised Darlington, calling her "fantastic" and "a breath of fresh air." He added "It was brief in the scheme of things, but I know Valentina keeps in touch with her and they're catching up over Christmas."

=== Storylines ===
Poppy and her older cousin Ruby arrive in Erinsborough and go to Charlie's because they want to see a genuine Australian bar. They walk in just as Zeke Kinski (Matthew Werkmeister), Ringo Brown (Sam Clark), Lucas Fitzgerald (Scott Major) and Michael Williams (Sandy Winton) make a bet – who gets the number of the next girl to walk in the door, wins. Zeke and Ringo get to know the girls and Zeke tells them that his sister goes to university in the UK and Poppy guesses that it is Oxford. Michael and Ruby get on well and before the girls leave, Poppy tells Ruby to give Michael her number. Poppy and Ruby return to the bar and see Michael and Lucas again. Poppy tells them that she and Ruby have changed their plans about passing through. She then asks Michael why he did not call Ruby and he replies that he did not think she was serious. Ruby asks Michael to breakfast the next day. Poppy goes with her, but she sits at a table nearby. When Ruby goes to the bathroom, Poppy comes over to Michael and asks how it is going. He also goes to the bathroom and his daughter, Natasha, speaks to Poppy thinking she is Michael's date. She tells Poppy that her father has a different date each week. Michael and Ruby return and Michael asks Poppy what Natasha said. Poppy and Ruby go to Ramsay Street, so Ruby can meet Michael for her date. Michael tells Natasha that she and Poppy can stay in and have a DVD night. Poppy says that Ruby and Michael are sweet together before asking Natasha about her day. The next day, Natasha sees Poppy and Ruby in Charlie's and calls Poppy over to talk. She asks her about what she misses about England and then she asks if Poppy and Ruby want to go shopping with her and Summer Hoyland (Jordy Lucas). Poppy and Ruby spot Natasha outside and she asks them if they want to hang out as Summer has left. Ruby later breaks up with Michael and Poppy tells Natasha that you cannot mess with destiny.

Natasha runs into Poppy and Ruby at Harold's Store and tells Ruby to meet up with Michael before she goes. Ruby tells her that she and Poppy have too much to do, but Poppy says that they have finished packing and it is a great idea. The next day, Poppy and Ruby go to Charlie's and Natasha sends Poppy over to Summer while she sets Michael and Ruby up. After they talk, Poppy tells them that they should not have to end their relationship like that and tells them to make the most of the time that they have left. She then tells them to have an entire relationship in one day, which they enjoy. Michael then asks Ruby to stay. Poppy is excited for Ruby, but Ruby turns Michael down. The next day, Poppy goes to Michael's and Natasha tells her that Ruby and Michael are not there. The couple arrive home and they all organise a goodbye lunch. At Harold's Store, Poppy and Natasha get some food for the plane, while Michael and Ruby say goodbye. Poppy hugs Natasha and she and Ruby head to the airport.

== Ruby Rogers ==
Ruby Rogers
- Neighbours character
- Portrayed by: Yesse Spence
- First appearance: 22 September 2010
- Last appearance: 28 October 2010
- Introduced by: Susan Bower
In-universe information
- First cousins: Poppy Rogers
- Other relatives: Bohdi Rogers

Ruby Rogers, played by Yesse Spence, made her first on-screen appearance on 22 September 2010. She arrives in town with her cousin Poppy. Ruby and Poppy (Gabriella Darlington) are British backpackers who are first seen when they end up in Charlie's Bar. Both of the girls soon attract the attention of some of the local male residents, but Ruby is the one they are most interested in. They have no previous connection to Ramsay Street. Ruby is an Australian who has been living in the UK for a while. During her time in town, Ruby begins a relationship with Michael Williams (Sandy Winton). Winton revealed that Poppy and Michael's daughter, Natasha (Valentina Novakovic) "reluctantly" push them together. Ruby and Michael have a lot of fun together and it is Michael first relationship in "a while". Natasha does not like Michael dating Ruby, but she sees that Michael is happy. Before Ruby goes back home, they go surfing and manage to have an entire relationship in one day. Winton added that Michael is sad when it is all over. In December 2010, Jordy Lucas (who plays Summer Hoyland) called for Ruby's return, she added "I think Ruby was fantastic and it was nice for Michael to have a strong connection with her as well."

Ruby is Poppy's older cousin and she lives in London. The girls arrive in Erinsborough together and go to Charlie's bar. They get to know Zeke Kinski (Matthew Werkmeister) and Ringo Brown (Sam Clark), before talking to Lucas Fitzgerald (Scott Major) and Michael Williams. Ruby likes that Michael is a school principal and that he has a strong relationship with his daughter. Poppy tells Ruby to give Michael her number and she does. Ruby and Poppy return to the bar and see Michael and Lucas again, they tell the guys that they have changed their plans about passing through. Poppy asks Michael why he did not call Ruby and he replies that he did not think she was serious. Ruby says she was and asks Michael to breakfast the next day. Michael and Ruby get on well, but when they go to the bathroom, Michael's daughter, Natasha, tells Poppy that her father has a different girl each week. Poppy tells Ruby, but Michael realises that Natasha was trying to put Ruby off. He and Ruby then arrange another date. Michael and Ruby text each other and when he gets home from work, Ruby and Poppy are waiting for him. Michael and Ruby then go out to dinner. When Natasha asks Ruby and Poppy to go shopping with her and Summer Hoyland, Ruby declines. Ruby and Poppy spot Natasha outside and she asks if they can hang out. Natasha then says that all men are gross and Ruby tells her that her father is not. Ruby believes that Natasha does not like the idea of her going out with her father. She tells her that she and Michael are having fun and that Natasha is making too much of a deal out of the situation. Natasha tells her that she does not want Michael to get hurt. Ruby meets up with Michael and tells him that she is going home because she misses London. She says that she really likes him, but it is better to leave now rather than later.

Natasha runs into Ruby and Poppy at Harold's Store and tells Ruby to meet up with Michael before she goes. Ruby tells her that she and Poppy have too much to do, but Poppy thinks it is a great idea. Ruby says that she will have to say goodbye to Michael all over again and that it was hard enough the first time. Ruby and Michael are set up by Natasha and they talk. They tell Natasha and Poppy that they have decided to end everything, until Poppy tells them to have an entire relationship in one day. Ruby and Michael enjoy themselves and Michael later tells Ruby that they should not let their relationship go and asks her to stay. Ruby tells Michael that she really likes him, but she cannot abandon her whole life in England. Ruby then tells him that the day is not over yet and they spend all night at the beach. Ruby and Michael say goodbye at Harold's Store, before she and Poppy leave for the airport.

== Eli Baker ==
Eli Baker
- Neighbours character
- Portrayed by: P.J. Lane
- First appearance: 29 September 2010
- Last appearance: 30 September 2010
- Introduced by: Susan Bower
In-universe information
- Occupation: Journalist

Eli Baker is played by Australian entertainer Don Lane's son, P.J. Lane. He made his first on-screen appearance on 29 September 2010. In July 2010, it was announced that Lane would be making a guest appearance on the show, in episodes that were to be shot in Sydney. The episodes mark the first time in nearly ten years that the show has filmed in the city. Of his part, Lane said "I play an ex-boyfriend, actually not just an ex, but a perfect ex-boyfriend, so my character is bound to cause a bit of jealously, it is going to be great fun. It is really good to be a part of Neighbours". Lane originally auditioned for another role in May 2010, but was unsuccessful. Not long after, he was offered the role of Eli. The storyline in which Lane's character makes his debut revolves around Toadfish Rebecchi (Ryan Moloney) and Sonya Mitchell (Eve Morey) going on a holiday aboard a luxury cruise liner. They run into Eli, who is Sonya's ex. TV Week said "Meeting Eli brings out an inferiority complex in Toadie". Moloney added "Toadie feels challenged by Eli's perfection, he is annoyed that someone can be so nice, so good-looking and so good at everything".

Callum Jones (Morgan Baker) wins tickets for a cruise, but as he is underage he gives them to Toadfish Rebecchi and Sonya Mitchell. Toadie and Sonya are taking pictures of Sydney when a man comes over to join them. He turns out to be Sonya's ex-boyfriend Eli and she introduces the two guys to each other. Toadie explains to Eli that he is taking a cardboard cut out of Callum on the cruise, so he still feels he is there with them. Eli tells them that he is a journalist and is going on the cruise to write a story about it. Eli tells Toadie and Sonya that he is looking forward to hanging out with them. Toadie asks Sonya how long she dated Eli and she reveals that they dated for 6 months. Just as Toadie is setting up a picnic, Eli jogs past and invites Toadie to join him. Eli mentions that when he broke up with Sonya, he took up running and now runs a half marathon every day. Eli suggests that they run another lap, but Toadie declines. Sonya then tells him that she invited Eli to dinner. Toadie begins to feel left out when Eli and Sonya start reminiscing about their past and Toadie suggests that they have a karaoke competition, which Eli agrees to. Eli asks Toadie if he wants to give it a miss and go to the circus, but Toadie says no. Eli takes to the stage and starts singing well, which goes down well with the crowd. Eli finishes his song to rapturous applause. Toadie comes up and Eli tells him to have fun. Toadie's singing is not good, but the crowd love his energetic performance and Eli is left looking shocked. Sonya later tells Toadie that Eli is too focused on himself, which she does not like.

== Nerida Willow ==
Nerida Willow
- Neighbours character
- Portrayed by: Jane Clifton
- First appearance: 15 November 2010
- Last appearance: 24 November 2010
- Introduced by: Susan Bower
In-universe information
- Occupation: Judge

Judge Nerida Willow, played by Jane Clifton, made her first appearance on 15 November 2010. The character and Clifton's casting details were announced on 7 September. Clifton filmed on location with the cast and crew, and was due to appear in five episodes. Filming with the show gave Clifton a chance to meet up with her former Prisoner co-stars Janet Andrewartha (Lyn Scully) and Jackie Woodburne (Susan Kennedy).

Judge Willow presides over Stephanie Scully's (Carla Bonner) culpable driving case, in which Ringo Brown (Sam Clark) was killed. When the prosecutor, Samantha Fitzgerald (Simone Buchanan), begins to question why Kate Ramsay (Ashleigh Brewer) changed her statement, Judge Willow tells her to get on with it and later tells her to stick to the facts when Sam brings up Kate's dead mother. Judge Willow tells Sam to tread carefully after she brings up Steph's relationship with Daniel Fitzgerald (Brett Tucker). When Sam then launches a personal attack on Libby Kennedy (Kym Valentine), Judge Willow tells her to stop. Following the end of the witness statements, she tells the jury that they have a hard task ahead of them. They later decide that Steph is guilty. Before Judge Willow has a chance to read out the sentence, she is interrupted by Donna Freedman (Margot Robbie), who wishes to change her statement. Judge Willow tells her to sit down, but Donna continues. Judge Willow calls a recess, and when she returns she sentences Steph to six years in prison with a non-parole period of two years.

== Jade Mitchell ==
Jade Mitchell, played by Gemma Pranita, is Sonya Mitchell's (Eve Morey) younger sister. She made her first on-screen appearance on 10 December 2010. Jade arrives on Ramsay Street to expose Sonya's dark secret. Of how she got the role, Pranita said "They were holding auditions and I happened to be in Russia doing a Chekhov pilgrimage because I'd received a grant. I just thought, oh well, it's not to be but then I came back and my agent called and said I can squeeze you in on the last day. So within a week I was moving cities." Pranita revealed that Jade has the potential to cause big trouble for Sonya and that she is going to "completely rock the boat." She is described as being "Vivacious, confident and beautiful."

== Others ==
Date(s)	Character	Actor	Circumstances
11 January–27 May	Father Sean Corrigan	Geordie Taylor	It was announced in September 2009 that Taylor would be joining the cast of Neighbours. Sean Corrigan is the priest at an Erinsborough church. Lyn Scully suggests to her daughter, Steph that she should talk to Father Corrigan about her problems and Steph tells him that she does not need to. Four days later Steph goes back to the church to get some advice from Sean about her feeling for Lucas Fitzgerald and the situation with his brother, Dan. Lyn invites Sean to her house to talk, when she finds it difficult keeping Steph's secret.
18 January–28 May	Scott "Griffo" Griffin	Eamonn George	Harry Ramsay is not happy when Andrew Robinson makes friends with Griffo, because he is a bully. Griffo tries to warn Harry off of basketball try outs. Andrew embarrasses Griffo and Griffo gets his revenge, by stealing a USB with a recording of Donna Freedman and Andrew together. Andrew blackmails Griffo into giving the USB back, but Griffo plays the video at Charlie's. Griffo intimidates and threatens Harry, but he gets on the basketball team. Griffo and Harry meet for a one-on-one game and Harry outshines Griffo. During Kate Ramsay's first day as a trainee teacher, Griffo disrupts her class, but Kate later teases him in front of his friends.
12 January	Vince Beltzer	Michael Wannenmacher	Owner of a security firm that Andrew used for his club night during Schoolies week. Vince tracks Andrew down to Ramsay Street get some money that was owed to him. He threatens Andrew until Paul arrives and gives him the money.
18 January	Joanne Bell	Anita Clements	Joanne is Lucas Fitzgerald's and Billy Forman's physiotherapist at the rehab centre. Joanne dislikes Lucas' cocky attitude and is tough on him. She is not happy when he and Billy go to Charlie's for a beer. However, Lucas is later able to take a few steps with Joanne's help.
18 January – 21 February 2011	Billy Forman	Jez Constable	Lucas Fitzgerald meets Billy in rehab and they become friends. Lucas takes Billy to Charlie's for a beer, which angers their physiotherapist. In November, Lucas meets up with Billy and sells him some tools to raise money to buy a new suit for Stephanie Scully. Billy calls Lucas and they meet at Charlie's. Billy realises that Lucas is short of money and asks to store some boxes in the garage in return for cash. Lucas accepts the deal. Billy later returns with more boxes. When Lucas needs some money to buy a motorbike, Billy gives him the contact details for his friend, Garland Cole. Garland offers Lucas the chance to get involved in illegal street racing and Billy encourages Lucas to accept. When Lucas does not listen to Garland about throwing a race, Billy warns him that he is going to be in trouble. He later tells Lucas not to race again, but Lucas ignores him.
19 January	Clint Steedwell	Simon Barbaro	An employee at Lassiter's Hotel who tells Andrew Robinson that they are short staffed behind the bar in the function room. Andrew tells him that he is free and over 18 and Clint puts him to work.
25 January	Rich Messing	Rhys Hamlyn	A member of Mia Zannis' group of animal rights activists who break into the Elliot Park testing facility with Zeke Kinski.
28 January – 27 July 2011	Dean Harman	Cameron Heine	Dean initially befriends Callum Jones, before turning against him and Sophie Ramsay and bullying them. He is suspended when Libby Kennedy finds out that he cheated on a test. He later teases Callum when the news comes out about Stephanie Scully's affair with Daniel Fitzgerald. Dean taunts Callum about his accident and his mother and Callum starts a fight with him. Dean has an older brother, Stewart. Both Dean and Stewart tease Natasha Williams about her appearance in the wake of her photo scandal.
9–24 February	Paul O'Regan	Mark Mitchell	Paul O'Regan is the Magistrate who presides over Zeke Kinski's trial for trespassing. He is not happy to hear Zeke has changed his plea to not guilty and urges him to reconsider. When Zeke argues with O'Regan, he places him in contempt of court. After a plea from Susan Kennedy, O'Regan gives Zeke a six-month good behaviour bond. O'Regan also presides over Lucas Fitzgerald's trial for damaging Toadfish Rebecchi's car. Lucas refuses a lawyer and tells the court that he would rather go to jail then pay the fine. O'Regan then allows Libby Kennedy to enter the court and speak to Lucas.
9 February–25 October	Phillip Green	Mario Setyana	Phillip is Zeke Kinski's lawyer at his trial for trespassing. He returns in October to represent Stephanie Scully after she accidentally kills Ringo Brown. Steph later hires Toadfish Rebecchi to represent her instead.
11 February – 10 October 2011	Adam Miller	Jye O'Toole	He is first seen at Harold's Store talking to Zeke Kinski about PirateNet. He is among the group of boys who buy Andrew Robinson's guide to girls at the gym. A few months later, he invites Chris Pappas and Summer Hoyland to his party. When Chris comes out, Adam teases him and gives him a hard time, but moving the basketball practice time around without telling him. Chris later decides to quit the team and Summer has a go at Adam.
16 February – 6 May 2011	Lisa Devine	Sophie Tilson	Lisa is a student at Erinsborough High and an employee at Lassiter's Hotel. Lisa is a member of the Mathletes and she invites Natasha Williams to join. Natasha manages to manipulate Lisa into thinking that Summer Hoyland and Zeke Kinski are together. Lisa then spreads the rumour about them. After she learns that Natasha is pregnant, Lisa and the rest of the Mathletes kick her out of the group. However, Natasha convinces them to let her rejoin. Lisa hosts a party at Lassiter's Lake. Andrew kisses Lisa to make Summer jealous and they begin dating. Lisa gives Sophie Ramsay a make over, but she is not happy when Sophie takes Summer's advice and make over instead. Natasha wins the Mathletes captaincy from Lisa and Andrew breaks up with her.
17 February – 11 July 2011	Tim Ford	Steve Simmons	Tim Ford is Erinsborough High's basketball teacher. He talks to Harry Ramsay about trying out for the team and is then seen at the try outs putting the players through their paces. He selects Harry for the team. Tim later asks the team to select a captain and they choose Chris Pappas. Tim tells Harry to take a break from the team when he deliberately knocks into Chris. In July 2011, Chris tells Tim that he is quitting the team.
5 March–11 November	Andrea Weisberger	Elizabeth Friels	Donna Freedman's university lecturer. In November, she marks Donna's assignment and tells her that as she has not followed the brief, she has to fail her.
18–22 March	Renee Righetti	Nicole Gulasekharam	Renee is Summer Hoyland's friend, who gets set up on a date with Harry Ramsay. Harry strings Renee along until Kate Ramsay tells him to be honest with her.
16 April	Bryony Harris	Chandu Senevirathna	Doug Harris' niece, who is in the same dance class as Ben Fitzgerald.
26–27 April	Nicholas McKay	Chris Bunworth	He was Cassandra Freedman's lecturer and had a relationship with her. Nicholas turns up at Charlie's looking for Donna. He tells her that he could be her father. Andrew Robinson then looks him up online and discovers that he was in jail for fraud. Donna tells him that she doesn't want him to be her father. He leaves when Donna tells him that Nick Nixon is her real dad.
4 May	Bradley Hewson	Liam McIntyre	Bradley is a student who Naomi Lord pays to pretend to be her brother in front of Ringo Brown and Donna Freedman.
2 June	David Foster	Ben Ridgwell	David is Sonya Mitchell's new boyfriend. During their dinner at Charlie's, Lucas comes over to say hello to Sonya and ends up talking to David. David later comes to collect Sonya from Harold's Store and he meets Toadfish Rebecchi. Sonya plans to move to Perth with David, but she later breaks up with him because she is still in love with Toadfish.
16 June–2011	Margie Chengatu	Awa Ndiaye	Margie is a waitress at Harold's Store with Lyn Scully and Kate Ramsay. Until August 2010, she had a non-speaking role.
17 June–1 July	Gemma Pickford	Polita Cameron	A student in Susan Kennedy's university Ethics class. Susan tells her to stop sending texts during her presentation and patronises her. Gemma come to Charlie's to tell Susan that her presentation was boring. Donna Freedman later confronts Gemma and Gemma tells her that Susan is trying too hard to be "cool". Gemma and Susan later become friends, despite Susan accusing her of sending threats.
17 June–2 July	John Bradley	Laurence Brewer	John is Susan Kennedy's university lecturer. He initially offers his help when Susan begins receiving threats. Susan is followed by a black car, which she later realises is John's. Susan discovers that John is the person behind the threats because he failed as a student teacher when he was teaching at Erinsborough High in 1995.
23 June–8 November	Russell Walsh	Glen Hancox	Russell is a private investigator hired by Paul Robinson to dig up information on Toadfish Rebecchi. Paul wants immediate results, but Russell fails to find anything and Paul tells him to bug Toadie's phones. Paul later hires Russell to get an affidavit from a witness, so it can be used in Stephanie Scully's court case.
23 July – 23 February 2011	David Whitaker	Shane Lee	David is a member of the Erinsborough High board. He comes to the school to see a demonstration of the new interactive whiteboards. Libby Kennedy recognises him as her supervisor from when she was doing her teacher practice. David attends a basketball match and when a fight breaks out involving Chris Pappas, David has him suspended. David later returns to the school to suspend Michael Williams from his job as Principal. He reinstates him after listening to Susan Kennedy.
20 August	Amanda Pappas	Mary Kost	Amanda and Ricardo are Chris Pappas' parents. After discovering their son is gay and that he has been suspended from school for fighting, Amanda and Ricardo kick him out. They later meet with Chris at Harold's Store and after talking things through, they let him come home. Chris's parents were later reintroduced to Neighbours with different actors and names.
20 August	Ricardo Pappas	Mark Andrew	Amanda and Ricardo are Chris Pappas' parents. After discovering their son is gay and that he has been suspended from school for fighting, Amanda and Ricardo kick him out. They later meet with Chris at Harold's Store and after talking things through, they let him come home. Chris's parents were later reintroduced to Neighbours with different actors and names.
27 August, 8 September	Jack Ward	Peter Lowrey	Jack is a hitman, who Diana Marshall contacts in regards to getting rid of Paul Robinson. Diana meets Jack at Harold's Store to pay him and explain that she wants the job done to her satisfaction, as she is leaving in the morning. Diana later meets with Jack. When he throws his phone into a bin, Natasha Williams retrieves it. Jack spots her and grabs onto her arm, asking her what she is doing. Natasha's friends arrive and Jack leaves.
31 August	Mrs. June Thomas	Janet Foye	Mrs. Thomas is the owner of the hotel where Ringo Brown and Donna Freedman are spending their honeymoon. She tells the couple about a ghost that roams the rooms.
1 September	Elaine Rushmore	Soula Alexander	Elaine is Ben Fitzgerald's teacher. She accuses him of cheating on an assignment. She tells Ben's mother, Libby Kennedy, that Ben does not concentrate in class and that he does not write about what she tells him to.
3–13 September 2010, 7 October–1 September 2016, 31 August 2017, 7 June 2018	Adam Fitzgerald	Isabella Münch; Archie Campbell	Adam is Stephanie Scully and Daniel Fitzgerald's son. Steph gives birth while she is staying with her father. Shortly after, Steph decides to give custody of the baby to Dan, who names him Adam. In 2016, Adam's uncle Lucas Fitzgerald brings him to Erinsborough to spend the day with Steph. The following year, Adam returns to spend more time with Steph. She and Ben Kirk take him to the community gardens to play with remote control cars. When Adam loses control of his car, he runs after it and attempts to retrieve it from underneath a parked car. Steph stops the driver from reversing over him and pulls Adam to safety.
22 September	Clare Henderson	Sarah Roberts	As Clare sets up music equipment for a gig at Charlie's, she gets talking to Zeke Kinski. Lucas Fitzgerald soon approaches her and helps out, so Clare offers to buy him a drink and gives him her phone number.
26 October	Ryan Chew	Peter Bright	Ryan is a journalist who works at the Erinsborough News. When Paul Robinson returns to work, he holds a meeting at Charlie's and tells the news team that they have been doing a good job. Ryan asks if Paul wants to turn the paper into a good news rag. Paul later asks Ryan to run a story about Ringo Brown in the paper, but Ryan disagrees until Paul reminds him that he is the boss.
11 November – 12 April 2011	Tomas Bersky	Tim Munley	Tomas is a club promoter and who Andrew Robinson meets with to talk about setting up a business together. Tomas takes a liking to Summer Hoyland and Andrew tells him that he and Summer are together to get Tomas to back off. Tomas later meets with Andrew and Natasha Williams. He asks about Summer and Natasha tells him to go to Harold's Store. Tomas asks Summer out on a date and she agrees. The date goes well, but Andrew talks to Tomas, who tells him that if he cannot trust him to do right by Summer then they cannot trust each other to do business. Andrew teams up with Tomas again to organise a dance party and he later discovers that Tomas wants to sell drugs there. The police interrupt the party, but they do not find anything on Tomas. However, Andrew tells them what happened and Tomas is arrested.
