= Declan Napier =

Fictional character

- Neighbours character
- James Sorensen as Declan Napier (2009)
- Portrayed by: James Sorensen (2007–2010); Erin Mullally (2010–2011); Thomas Smith (flashback)
- Duration: 2007–2011
- First appearance: 25 July 2007
- Last appearance: 15 March 2011
- Introduced by: Ric Pellizzeri
- Erin Mullally as Declan (2010)
In-universe information
- Occupation: Erinsborough High Student (2007–2009); Lassiter's Hotel Staff (2007–2011); Business Undergraduate (2010)
- Father: Richard Aaronow
- Mother: Rebecca Napier
- Stepfather: Paul Robinson
- Brothers: Oliver Barnes; Andrew Robinson (step)
- Sisters: Elle Robinson (step)
- Wife: Bridget Parker (2009)
- Daughters: India Napier
- Grandfathers: Alan Napier
- Uncles: Marcus Napier
- Nieces: Chloe Cammeniti

Declan Napier is a fictional character from the Australian Network Ten soap opera Neighbours, played by James Sorensen from 2007 to 2010, and Erin Mullally from 2010 to 2011. In January 2010 it was announced that Sorensen had quit the role of Declan and the decision to recast was taken, with Mullally making his first on-screen appearance on 3 May 2010. In October 2010, it was announced the character was to leave Neighbours and he made his final appearance on 15 March 2011.

The character was originally portrayed as a "teenage tearaway" but later settled down. He has been involved with some of the series' most controversial storylines including teenage pregnancy which caused an upset among conservative family groups, coping with his wife's death and a relationship with fellow character Kate Ramsay which was initially received as distasteful and unbelievable with Australian viewers. Declan has also been popularised whilst Sorensen played him for his 'good looks' and physical appearance, subsequently being branded as one of the show's most popular characters.

== Character creation and casting ==
In 2007, Neighbours suffered a significant decline in ratings and plans were made to take the series into a 'back to basics' approach where storylines would become less controversial and return to the focus on relationships and family dynamics. It was at this point that the character of Declan was created and actress Jane Hall would play his on-screen mother Rebecca Napier. The characters were to create a family unit for then, already existing character Oliver Barnes (David Hoflin).

James Sorensen was cast as Declan in 2007 and his character appeared the same year. After he had played the character for nearly three years Sorensen decided to quit the series to pursue a career outside of acting. Instead of the character departing the series Five confirmed that a decision had been made to recast the role.

"There are some other interests aside from acting that I want to pursue and, after three years on the show, I feel that now is the right time for me to leave."

— Sorensen on his decision to leave the role of Declan. (2010)

Erin Mullally was cast in the role and began filming immediately after Sorensen's departure from the production. In a statement from the press office at Five, they stated: "As the character of Declan is extremely popular, and with some sensational storylines planned, it was decided that the character would be recast" Sorensen expressed his delight that his character would continue as a part of the series saying: "I'm really happy the character's going to continue because the producers and writers have given Declan some fantastic storylines. I'm really proud he's become as popular as he has." At the time it was noted that recasts have occurred repeatedly throughout the history of the programme, creator of Neighbours, Reg Watson previously explained why he thought recasts were quintessential in the show saying: "I always believed it was a pity, when actors chose to leave a serial that the character should go as well. A lot of time and money is invested in the character so we decided to recast if the character was important to the future of the storyline and the show itself." It was this explanation that backed up Declan's recast. Sorensen also explained that the hand-over process would be simple adding: "It'll be nothing over the top. I'm Declan one day and the next day it's Erin. Pretty simple. That's how it works, I can't continue, so Erin comes in and picks up the baton. I think it's easier for the viewers to accept when it's a simple change-over." The recast had also upset fans of the character under the portrayal of Sorensen, in response to this he said: "Erin will come in and play his version of Declan, he can't play it exactly as I do and I and the producers would never expect him to do it any other way. All I can say to the Declan supporters is that Erin will be terrific, give him a go, you'll be surprised."

Sorensen also felt that it would be strange to see Declan played by Mullally, saying: "Of course it will be strange to see someone playing the part that I started and basically created, it's been my life. It's not just being Declan at the studio, I get 'Declan' on the street, at restaurants, everywhere. Declan is me so to hand it over is difficult." He also felt humble that viewers thought the character would not be the same played by another actor, adding: "I'm very humbled that a lot of people think that – I can understand why fans would feel that way because I starred as Declan for the past three years and that's all anyone knows."

Mullally later stated he did not know he was auditioning for a recast, he also stated that he wasn't sure if he could be successful in the role to start with. He also watched hours of footage of previous episodes to get an idea of how to portray Declan, then making a statement to Declan fans reading: "I'm sure that initially people will be quite confronted by a new face with the same character name – I'm not fooling myself about that. But hopefully people will come to accept it." Mullally has compared the two versions of Declan saying "One of the writers said to me in a meeting the other day that the changeover between James and me can be best described as James playing Declan as very strong, macho. He liked to get into things and was very proactive. "The new Declan is more grown up, quite mature and savvy. He thinks with his head and knows what he wants and doesn't have to use brute force to get it." During Rebecca's vision, Thomas Smith portrayed a six-year-old Declan.

In October 2010, it was announced that Mullally was to leave Neighbours along with three other members of the cast, Matthew Werkmeister (Zeke Kinski), Jane Hall (Rebecca Robinson) and Alia and Gabriella De Vercelli (India Napier). On his decision to leave, Mullally said "I've had an absolute ball playing Declan, the guy has been through so much, he needs a rest. I've made so many new friends but it will be my 'daughters' Alia and Gabriella (de Vercelli) I'll really miss, it has been wonderful to watch them grow and develop and be a part of their lives."

== Character development ==
=== Characterisation ===
Declan's personality has evolved through his given storylines. He was once a "teenage tearaway" but over time had to face the harsh realities life has thrown at him, subsequently maturing. Channel Ten publicity describe in depth many of his identity changes. They stated that he has a "dark side" but has learnt to nurture it through his relationship with Bridget Parker (Eloise Mignon). He is also branded as disenfranchised and disillusioned as a result of being the product of a struggling single parent family. Declan has learnt to mask his dark side with cocky persona and confidence in his abilities. Branded as a charmer, when he gets close to girls dark side pushed them away. The official website also states that they portrayed the character in his early stages as a "modern day Robin Hood", as he would commit petty crimes and gain finances to help his mother run her household. This soon fazed out and Declan's relationship with Bridget helped mature him as a character. They also stated that they knew Declan was not a bad boy at heart and decided to show this. He was later seen facing up to life as a single parent which changed him even more and he accepted his responsibilities.

=== Teenage pregnancy ===
A high-profile storyline for the character was when he got his girlfriend Bridget pregnant. The storyline progressed and saw the couple decide to have the child. This caused controversy and an 'outcry' from conservative family groups in Australia who accused the programme of using the characters to normalise teenage pregnancy. Speaking on behalf of the groups, Pro-Family Perspectives director Angela Conway said: "[Teenage pregnancy] is not something that should be considered the norm, programmes like Neighbours can make the behaviours that lead to teenage pregnancy seem normal and acceptable. A lot of kids just aren't ready to get their head around details of explicit sexuality." Neighbours executive producer Susan Bower was quick to defend her character's storyline stating: "I am quite sure a lot of people are not happy with this storyline. We decided we would show the ramifications on the teenagers' lives." Mignon added that the storyline between Declan and Bridget was not shallow, trite, vulgar, further adding she wouldn't have liked to film the storyline if it was and branded it as showing emotional spectrum of pregnancy justice. Critics slammed the show, noting that Neighbours is a G-rated show, and the storyline could lead to more promiscuity and teenage pregnancies among young viewers. The storyline continued regardless of the controversy and Declan became a father, and shortly after Bridget died in a car accident. Declan was left as a single parent.

=== Relationship with Kate Ramsay ===
The character later became the center of disapproval from viewers, who felt Declan was moving on too fast after Bridget's death when he developed feelings for Kate Ramsay (Ashleigh Brewer). Sorensen then backed the storyline, wanting his character to move on stating: "It's a difficult situation. Declan was truly in love with Bridget. He was one of the lucky ones to have found his soul mate early in life, but at the same time, he has to move on and live his life." further adding: "A lot of people do think it's too soon for another relationship. But I can assure you that it's done very tastefully." He then added an explanation to how Declan feels, adding: "He feels as though he's cheated on Bridget and that he hasn't mourned for long enough to be able to move on without showing proper respect to the love of his life. He's left confused and upset." As scenes from the storyline began to air Brewer made comment on the storyline reassuring viewers adding: "I think they'll be okay with it... I think they'll be accepting. It's done very tastefully and very slowly. The two characters don't rush anything."

Declan was then portrayed as having even more trouble battling his feelings for Kate, but tried hard not to forget Bridget. Of this Sorensen explained "I'm glad that, some months down the track, all wasn't forgotten. It's such a sad situation. Declan really does like Kate and she feels the same way about him. But his heart won't let him move on." After the couple began dating it attracted a bigger mixed response from viewers, many felt it was still too soon after Bridget. Sorensen then spoke out once more defending his character stating:

We were expecting that. The Bridget and Declan relationship was built on so much foundation. There was a lot of time invested in it and it ended so suddenly. But viewers will see that it's really not an easy choice now for Declan. He struggles so much with it and he doesn't want to move on. I do think the audience will learn to accept this new romance. I'd like to tell them to hang in there and give it a chance.

The storyline then carried on progressing and viewers saw the two characters grow closer until they started a relationship, despite the mixed response received from fans of Declan and Bridget.

In August 2010, Declan and Kate's relationship ended when Kate chose to break up with him after he began pushing her away. Declan starts a new job and he later lies to his family in front of her. Mullally said "Declan's been pushing Kate away, he has so much going on in his life. He's holding on to these massive pieces of information that he feels he can't share with anyone – not even Kate." When Kate sees Declan lying to his mother, she believes that he is not the boy she fell for and does not know if she can trust him. Mullally said that Declan is not prepared for the moment Kate breaks up with him and he is confused. Declan goes to Ringo Brown's (Sam Clark) bucks night where he meets Kate's rival, Candace Carey (Sheona Urquhart), who makes it clear that she is attracted to him. Declan and Candace later share a kiss, which Kate sees. Mullally said "Candace gets talking to Declan and is there for him, he wants comfort and makes that split-second decision to kiss her. He doesn't think about the consequences". Declan does not know Kate saw them together and Mullally added that he hoped they could move on as they "really do work as a couple".

== Storylines ==
=== Backstory ===
Declan was raised by single mother, Rebecca. They moved around a lot as Rebecca was running away from her abusive partner, and Declan's father, Richard (Blair Venn). Declan knew nothing about Richard, other than the fact that Rebecca referred to him as a "monster". Rebecca often struggles to pay the bills and Declan turned to crime to raise money.

=== 2007–11 ===
Declan meets Mickey Gannon (Fletcher O'Leary) and tries to help him out. Rebecca is revealed to be Oliver Barnes' mother and Declan eventually gets to meet his brother. Rebecca starts dating Paul Robinson (Stefan Dennis) and she and Declan move into Ramsay Street. Declan meets Richard and discovers that he raped Rebecca. Declan tries to drown Richard on a fishing trip. When it is revealed that Richard has kidney failure, Declan offers to give Richard one of his kidneys, so he can be kept alive to be punished for what he did to Rebecca. Rebecca refuses to give her permission and Oliver donates his instead. Richard's health grows worse and he dies. Declan and Rebecca attend his funeral.

Declan begins to spend time with Bridget Parker and they go joyriding together. Bridget is banned from seeing him after they are pursued by the police, but she sneaks out to meet Declan. They argue and Bridget leaves. She is then hit by a car and is paralysed down one side of her body. Declan becomes a suspect and he hides at Lassiter's Hotel. He is kidnapped by Nick Thompson (Marty Grimwood) and Laura Davidson (Jodi Flockhart), who want money from Paul. Laura eventually frees Declan and he is found by Rebecca, Paul and Oliver. Bridget believes Declan cannot handle her disability and she starts dating Josh Taylor (Liam Hemsworth). At an illegal dance party, Bridget, Josh and Declan become trapped when the roof falls in. Declan manages to carry Josh out before coming back for Bridget. He tells her that he does not have a problem with her disability and they start a relationship. Bridget discovers that she is pregnant and when she tells Declan, he runs away. He is arrested and kisses a football groupie, but he later returns and commits to Bridget and the baby. When Declan tries to rescue Elle Robinson's (Pippa Black) cat, he receives an electric shock. This makes him think about his life and he proposes to Bridget, who accepts. A few months later, Declan and Bridget marry in front of their friends.

Bridget gives birth to her and Declan's daughter, India (Alia and Gabriella De Vercelli). Shortly after, Bridget dies from injuries sustained in a car crash. Declan initially blames Stephanie Scully (Carla Bonner) for not fixing the Parker family's car properly. However, he discovers that Johnno Brewer (Damien Aylward) tampered with the car thinking it belonged to Lucas Fitzgerald (Scott Major). Declan develops feelings for Kate Ramsay and he accompanies her to the Deb Ball. During schoolies week, he kisses her, which leaves him feeling guilty for betraying Bridget. Rebecca tells him that it is okay to move on and Declan asks Kate on a date. They eventually begin dating. Donna Freedman (Margot Robbie) tells Declan to declare his feelings for Kate, as Kate does not know how he feels. Declan then calls Kate his girlfriend. Declan does not get on well with his step-brother, Andrew (Jordan Smith), and when Andrew steals Declan's ideas for Neighbour Day, they fight. Declan moves in with Kate for a few days, but later returns home. Kate later decides that she is ready to sleep with Declan for the first time.

Declan discovers that Paul is having financial difficulties and tells Rebecca. Paul gets into a dispute with a builder and tampers with the scaffolding at his site. Declan follows Paul and becomes angry with him. Donna is injured at the site and Paul decides to frame Declan by doctoring the CCTV footage. Declan finds out and asks Toadfish Rebecchi (Ryan Moloney) to help him. Toadie tells Declan that Paul has embezzled money from Lassiter's Hotel and Declan tells Diana Marshall (Jane Badler). Diana comes to Erinsborough and Declan tells her he made a mistake to protect Rebecca. Diana does not believe him and she finds the evidence of Paul's embezzlement. Paul asks Declan to take his place as manager of Lassiter's for six months and Declan and Diana team up to bring Paul down. Declan neglects Kate and she ends their relationship. He later kisses Candace Carey, which Kate witnesses. Paul discovers Diana and Declan's plan and threatens Declan. Paul is later pushed from the mezzanine of Lassiter's Hotel. Declan is questioned by Detective Mark Brennan (Scott McGregor) over the accident. Declan and Kate sleep together, but Kate tells him that it was a mistake. Declan encourages Rebecca to divorce Paul, but she tells him that Paul knows everything. Declan tells her that they need to leave. When Kate finds them packing, Declan tells her that he pushed Paul. However, he is covering for his mother.

Declan is devastated when his best friend, Ringo, dies. Kate tells Declan that they will not get back together and Declan is not happy when she starts dating Mark. He lies to her that Mark threatened and punched him. When Kate discovers that he lied, she tells him to stay away. Declan realises that Rebecca is not happy with Paul and he confronts his step-father. Paul tells him that he will tell Mark that Rebecca pushed him, if she tries to leave. Declan discovers that Rebecca has been having an affair with Michael Williams (Sandy Winton) and warns her to be careful. Rebecca leaves Paul after she gets an affidavit from him and she, Declan and India move into a hotel. Paul becomes manager of Lassiter's again and demotes Declan. When he verbally attacks Rebecca, Declan quits his job and he moves in with Kate. Declan calls Oliver, who arrives to help Rebecca escape Paul. Declan tells Rebecca that he and India are leaving with Oliver and Rebecca later makes the decision to leave with them.

== Reception ==
The character has been popular in terms of his appearance. Nick Levine of media reporting website Digital Spy claimed in a section aimed specifically at gay readers, that Declan (played by Sorensen at the time) was one of the main reasons to tune into Neighbours after its move in the UK to Five. Levine was commenting on the character's appearance and favoured the character different occasions branding him as 'something nice to look at' and has commented that he is a 'fittie'.

ATV New Network also said that the reason Declan is so popular with viewers was because of Sorensen's acting abilities and good looks. Both Five and Sorensen spoke out about how the character is one of Neighbours' most popular characters. Channel Five's Holy Soap website praised the character's heroism in scenes where he rescued Josh during the dance party roof collapse, they also said it is one of the character's most memorable scenes.

Ruth Deller of entertainment website Lowculture included Declan in her February 2009 feature about soap characters she loathes because of his behavior upon finding out Bridget is pregnant. She said "Don't go all woobie on us, Napier. You got your girlfriend pregnant, deal with it."

Following Bridget's death, a critic for the Daily Record commented on Declan's temper, writing "When it comes to holding back his feelings, Declan isn't exactly good at it. Quite the opposite in fact. When he first met his father a couple of years ago, he was so angry with him that he wanted to kill him. He's also spent lots of his time stomping moodily around when things haven't gone his way. So, perhaps Steph should hire herself a bodyguard or five, because the teenager is on the warpath after discovering that she was responsible for the accident that caused Bridget's death."
