= Rebecca Napier =

Fictional character from the Australian soap opera Neighbours

- Neighbours character
- Portrayed by: Jane Hall
- Duration: 2007–2011, 2014, 2019
- First appearance: 13 July 2007
- Last appearance: 10 September 2019
- Introduced by: Ric Pellizzeri (2007); Richard Jasek (2014); Jason Herbison (2019)
In-universe information
- Occupation: Legal secretary; Manager of Charlie's; PirateNet CEO; Twin Cities coordinator
- Family: Robinson
- Father: Alan Napier
- Brothers: Marcus Napier
- Husband: Paul Robinson (2009–2012)
- Sons: Oliver Barnes; Declan Napier
- Stepsons: Andrew Robinson
- Stepdaughters: Elle Robinson
- Granddaughters: Chloe Cammeniti; India Napier

Rebecca Napier (also Robinson) is a fictional character from the Australian soap opera Neighbours, played by Jane Hall. The show suffered a ratings decline in early 2007 and plans were put in place for storylines to focus more on relationships and family dynamics. During this period, the character of Rebecca was created and introduced. She made her first screen appearance during the episode broadcast on 13 July 2007. Rebecca is the mother of Oliver Barnes and Declan Napier. Rebecca departed on 15 March 2011, after Hall chose to leave the serial. Hall reprised the role in February 2014 and again in September 2019.

== Creation and casting ==
In 2007, Neighbours suffered a ratings decline and plans were put into place to take a "back to basics" approach where storylines would become less controversial and return to the focus on relationships and family dynamics. It was at this point that the character of Rebecca was created, and Jane Hall was cast in the role. The character was to create a family unit for existing character Oliver Barnes (David Hoflin). Of her casting Hall said "Neighbours is a legend of a show, and now, it's getting back to the heart-land, to relationships and family and the ins-and-outs of life." Hall later commented that her character had "shaken up" the series and made it more interesting, she also said that Rebecca has been on tumultuous journey since her inception.

Before the character had appeared on-screen there was speculation that Hall wanted to leave after only one day of filming as Rebecca. During an interview on Rove, Hall spoke about her melt down and what had caused her upset, saying "There is about fifteen to twenty minutes in the studio, per scene to shoot it. So I come in and it's my first day in studio and they have probably my most crucial scene, which is where I [Rebecca] met my son, I've never seen him before, I gave him up when I was 17. A pivotal scene and they say can we shoot it in five minutes, cut along story short I was crap, I went into the producers office and said you've made a terrible mistake, sack me now, we had to re-shoot it, and I wasn't much good the second time around either." She also said that in time she got to grips with her character and managed to portray her to an extent she was herself, happy with.

== Development ==
=== Characterisation ===
In her fictional backstory, Rebecca became estranged from her family after she became pregnant at seventeen. Rebecca's father, Alan (Barry Friedlander), pressured her into giving her baby son to Clifford (Andrew Wemyss) and Pamela Barnes (Brooke Nicol) to raise as their own. This forced Rebecca to grow up quickly. Unable to watch her son grow up with another family, Rebecca moved away. She later gave birth to another son, Declan (James Sorensen), and raised him alone. She did not stop thinking about the son she gave up years earlier. Rebecca raised Declan on her own and refused to accept charity from anyone.

As a result of her troubled past, Rebecca can appear to be "hard and stubborn". However, a writer for the official Neighbours website said Rebecca was also "strong, positive and incredibly kind-hearted". A Holy Soap reporter called Rebecca "beautiful and poised", but noted that she was hiding a broken heart over Oliver's adoption. Hall said Rebecca was "a very dramatic, heartfelt, heart-warming, serious character", which was not like her. The actress also explained that she relished the light-hearted, comedic stuff, which she did not get to explore that often with Rebecca. Hall added that she loved the "heartfelt moments" between Rebecca and her sons.

=== Relationship with Michael Williams ===
In November 2010, Rebecca found herself drawn to Michael Williams (Sandy Winton) after she is blackmailed by Paul Robinson (Stefan Dennis). As Rebecca and Michael spent more time together, they learned that they shared the same taste in music and they developed a friendship. However, there was also "a romantic spark" between them. When asked why Rebecca is drawn to Michael, Hall replied "Mike is really the antithesis of Paul and he just starts to look like a great option to Rebecca. He's this squeaky-clean, genuine guy, while all Rebecca can see in Paul is deceit and a web of lies with a shadowy history. She sees Mike as a breath of fresh air that she wants to have in her life. Rebecca and Mike are also the same age and were into the same stuff as kids." Hall stated that there was chemistry between Rebecca and Michael and thought they were well suited. She explained that she was fed up of Rebecca always going back to Paul, as she thought it sent out the wrong message to people. Hall also enjoyed working with Winton during the storyline.

Michael found himself able to open up to Rebecca about his problems with his daughter and she was happy to offer him a female opinion. As they swapped stories, they grew even closer and eventually began an affair. Paul noticed Rebecca's bond with Michael and not wanting another man to steal his wife, Paul tried to discourage Michael by organising for himself and Rebecca to renew their wedding vows. Rebecca was "absolutely devastated" by Paul's gesture, but in order to please him she agreed to go through with the ceremony. After the ceremony, Rebecca tried to explain to Michael why she went through with it, but her "cryptic" explanation left Michael thinking that she was "a complication he just doesn't need." Rebecca eventually confessed to Michael that she pushed Paul from the Lassiter's mezzanine and that he was blackmailing her to stay with him. Michael agreed to stay with Rebecca and she managed to leave Paul, who then tried to get revenge on the couple.

=== Departure ===
On 11 October 2010, it was announced that Hall had quit Neighbours. Hall explained that after nearly four years, she felt it was time to move and find new challenges. Hall said it was a difficult decision to leave, but she had "burnt out" and found it hard to parent her daughter and be in Neighbours at the same time. The actress revealed that the producers were not too happy about her leaving. Hall confirmed that Rebecca would not be killed off, as she did not want to lose the opportunity to come back. She added "I think my character has come a long way and has had some pretty crazy stuff happen to her, but it was time to move on." Hall filmed her final scenes on 8 December 2010 with her former husband and daughter watching on.

Towards the end of Rebecca's time in Erinsborough, her relationship with Paul deteriorates to a point where Rebecca needs to leave town and start over. To help facilitate Rebecca's departure, Natalie Blair and David Hoflin reprised their roles of Carmella Cammeniti and Oliver Barnes, who return to Erinsborough to help Rebecca "in her time of need". Blair said "They all have a history with Paul Robinson, and so they come back to protect Rebecca and watch out for her best interests." Rebecca's exit storyline also saw her confide in Susan Kennedy (Jackie Woodburne) about almost killing Paul, leaving her "a huge mess" to sort out. Rebecca departed in March 2011.

=== Returns ===
On 21 October 2013, it was announced that Hall would be returning to Neighbours in November to film a four-week guest stint. Hall stated: "I'm looking forward to working with some of my old friends and also a lot of new faces, however I suspect Stefan may not be thrilled with my return since I tried to kill him last time I was on Neighbours!" Executive producer Richard Jasek was "delighted" that Hall was returning and said there would be "plenty of fireworks" between Rebecca and Paul, who would be reunited under unusual circumstances. In an interview with Colin Vickery of Herald Sun, Hall explained that she had been asked to return twice, but the timing did not work out and she wanted to concentrate on her radio career. She continued: "Then I thought, I'd love to go back because it is like visiting family. I often miss acting. If you spend any time on Neighbours you come away feeling like you're a member of a club." Hall also explained that she loved working with Dennis, calling her first stint on the show playing his wife "one of the highlights of my career." She said that acting alongside him, Woodburne and Fletcher was one of the reasons she wanted to return to Neighbours.

Ahead of the character's come back, a TV Week Soap Extra writer confirmed that Rebecca's characteristic wrap dresses would remain, but she would be sporting "a more feminine wardrobe" upon her return. Costume designer Paul Warren explained "Her costumes are more flirty and playful They've got a lighter feel. They're also more feminine and romantic, with ruffles, florals and bold colours like watermelon." The reporter observed that Rebecca's new style could be a sign that love is in the air for her. Rebecca's return aired on 26 February 2014. Rebecca comes back to Erinsborough on business, initially unaware that Paul has orchestrated her return. Hall explained to an Inside Soap writer that after Paul notices Rebecca is involved in a twin cities project, he sees it as an opportunity to try and win her back. Hall admitted that Rebecca was "very nervous" about seeing Paul again. When asked if Rebecca might still have feelings for Paul, Hall replied "Absolutely! However, she's trying to fight those feelings because she has a moral dilemma after what she did to him. When she finds out that Paul set up the whole twin cities thing, she's taken by surprise – but deep down she's flattered." When Rebecca finally meets Paul, there is still "a spark" between them, though Rebecca denies it.

On 19 August 2019, the show released a promotional trailer confirming Hall had reprised the role again as part of an "ex-wives revenge plot". Rebecca's return coincides with Paul's upcoming wedding and the return of his former wives, who try to convince him to call the ceremony off, as there is something "broken" with him. Rebecca's return scenes aired on 2 September. Rebecca appears to have a plausible reason for returning to Erinsborough, but Paul is suspicious as both Gail Lewis (Fiona Corke) and Lyn Scully (Janet Andrewartha) have also returned in recent weeks. However, he cannot find anything to back up his theory that his former wives are playing a joke on him. Like Gail and Lyn, Rebecca also warns his fiancée Terese Willis (Rebekah Elmaloglou) not to marry him. She tells Terese about pushing Paul from the hotel mezzanine, believing that the relationship led her to become a violent person.

== Storylines ==
Oliver Barnes gets in touch with Rebecca when he learns she is his biological mother. They meet up and Rebecca explains to Oliver why she gave him up. Rebecca then tells Oliver that she wants no further contact with him and leaves. After looking through some mementos, Rebecca realises that she wants to get to know Oliver and they meet up again. When Oliver asks about his father, Rebecca backs off and she later cancels another meeting. Oliver's girlfriend Elle Robinson (Pippa Black) later confronts Rebecca about messing Oliver around. When Oliver is injured in a minibus crash, Rebecca visits him and spots a picture of Elle's father, Paul, whom she once spent a romantic weekend with several years earlier. Rebecca believes Paul is Oliver's father, so they take a DNA test. During this time, Rebecca grows closer to Paul. When the DNA test results come back negative, Rebecca realises that Oliver's father is her violent ex-partner Richard Aaronow (Blair Venn), who raped her, resulting in Declan's conception.

Rebecca and Paul begin dating and she and Declan move in with him. Rebecca decides to pursue a career in law and she starts working as a secretary at the local law firm. Feeling neglected, Paul embarks on an affair with Kirsten Gannon (Nikola Dubois). Paul asks Rebecca to marry him and she accepts. Susan Kennedy tells Rebecca about Paul's affair, leading her to end their engagement. Rebecca becomes a grandmother, after Oliver's daughter, Chloe (Sarah May) is born. Rebecca dates Andrew Simpson (Peter Flanigan) and agrees to marry him. But realising she still loves Paul, she ends her relationship with Andrew to get back with him. Rebecca becomes a grandmother for the second time when Declan's girlfriend, Bridget Parker (Eloise Mignon) gives birth to India (Alia and Gabriella Devercelli). When Bridget dies, Rebecca helps her parents Miranda (Nikki Coghill) and Steve (Steve Bastoni) organise the funeral. When Miranda and Steve decide to take India and move away to Oakey, Rebecca encourages her son to keep his daughter.

Rebecca asks Paul to marry her and he accepts. Rebecca and Paul's wedding is interrupted by Lyn Scully (Janet Andrewartha) when she announces that she and Paul are still married. Rebecca is furious that Lyn has ruined her day and she and Lyn have a scragfight outside Rebecca's house in front of the neighbours. Lyn signs the divorce papers and decides to stay in Erinsborough. She purchases Harold's Store and she and Rebecca, who has begun running Charlie's, try to sabotage each other's businesses. On Christmas Eve, Paul surprises Rebecca by organising a wedding for them in Charlie's. Paul buys local radio station, PirateNet, and appoints Rebecca CEO. Declan later tells Rebecca that Paul has been lying to her about his financial situation and if PirateNet fails, her name is on the papers and the creditors will bankrupt her. When she gives Paul a chance to tell her himself, he does not bring it up and Rebecca threatens Paul with a divorce.

When Paul sabotages Stephanie Scully (Carla Bonner) and Libby Kennedy (Kym Valentine) friendship, Rebecca is disgusted with him and asks him to move out. Rebecca allows Paul to move back home after he agrees to take six months off from Lassiter's, placing Declan in charge. Declan tells Rebecca that Paul has been embezzling money, while Diana Marshall (Jane Badler) confesses that she had sex with Paul. Rebecca is devastated and goes to Lassiter's to speak to Paul. Shortly afterwards, Paul is pushed off the mezzanine. Rebecca is questioned by the police, but denies pushing Paul. She later breaks down in Lyn's arms when Paul's affair with Diana is revealed. Rebecca asks Paul for a divorce, but he tells her that he remembers who pushed him and threatens to implicate Declan. When Kate Ramsay (Ashleigh Brewer) finds Declan and Rebecca packing, Rebecca confesses that she did push Paul. She explains that she did it after she went to confront him about his affair with Diana and threatening Declan.

Paul blackmails Rebecca into staying with him. Rebecca finds herself attracted to Michael Williams (Sandy Winton) and they grow close. Paul forces Rebecca into renewing their vows. Rebecca tells Declan that she loves Michael and she helps Lyn when Paul begins blackmailing her. When Michael asks Rebecca to leave Paul, she confesses that she pushed Paul from the mezzanine and he is blackmailing her. Paul asks Rebecca to spend the night with her at Lassiter's in exchange for filing an affidavit, which states that his fall was an accident and that he refuses the right to press charges against her. Rebecca then tells Paul that their marriage is over. Paul starts a revenge campaign against Rebecca and Declan. Declan contacts Oliver, who returns with his family to get Rebecca. Rebecca refuses to leave Michael and even agrees to marry him. Upon realising that Paul will not stop trying to get revenge, Rebecca tells Susan the truth about Paul's accident and asks her to encourage Kate to come forward to the police about her false alibi. That same day Rebecca, Declan and India leave Erinsborough with Oliver and his family.

Three years later, Rebecca returns to Erinsborough to meet with the mayor about a civic project called Twin Cities. Rebecca visits Susan and Karl (Alan Fletcher), after Karl's name appears on the cover letter. Rebecca runs into Paul and he informs her he is the new mayor and she is back because of him. Paul also admits that he still has feelings for her. After finalising the Twin Cities deal, Rebecca intends to return to Sydney. However, when she learns from Mark Brennan (Scott McGregor) that she was the reason his relationship with Kate ended, she decides to stay and help them get back together. Rebecca is not happy with Paul when he tells Mark to back off, but she softens towards Paul when she realises how much he cares for Kate, and they have sex. Paul asks Rebecca to quit her job and move back to Erinsborough to be with him. Seeing how much Paul is trying, Rebecca agrees. However, she tells Susan that she feels guilty about what she did to him and hopes that being with Paul, her guilt will ease. Susan tells Paul, but he does not believe her and thinks Rebecca still loves him. Rebecca realises that she should not have given Paul false hope and tells him she was staying out of guilt before deciding to return to Sydney. Rebecca sends flowers when Kate dies a few weeks later.

Five years later, Paul and Terese Willis find Rebecca waiting at the Erinsborough community centre, where she is meeting with Toadie to discuss a partnership between the women's shelter she runs and the Sonya Foundation. Rebecca appears surprised Paul and Terese are getting married, and that his former wives Lyn Scully and Gail Lewis are also in town. Rebecca catches up with Karl and Susan, and then she meets Gail for the first time. She admits that being back is bringing up unwelcome memories for her. Paul later finds Rebecca crying on the mezzanine and she apologises for pushing him off it. She tells him that she is angry at herself for letting him turn her into someone she never was. They hug and Terese confronts them, having seen them on the CCTV. Rebecca allows Paul to explain what happened to Terese, and she says that she did not think she was capable of hurting someone like that before marrying Paul. All the wives confront Terese at the day spa, but Rebecca and Lyn get into an argument. Rebecca meets and dates Gary Canning (Damien Richardson), but when she learns he is also seeing Gail, she ends their potential romance and leaves town.

== Reception ==
A Holy Soap writer stated Rebecca's most notable moment was "When Toadie and his firm were trying to win compensation for the victims of the dance party roof collapse, she was instrumental in securing the victory." After scenes involving the character fighting with Lyn Scully aired, Darren Rowe of entertainment website Digital Spy praised the scenes and branding it "one of the best episodes of 2009". Also stating: "It is a classic scene and quite simply Neighbours at its absolute best!". Ten years later, Joe Anderton of the same website called the scenes "a pretty famous fight" and hoped it would be brought up during Rebecca and Lyn's returns. Jim Schembri of The Age commented on Rebecca's choice in men after her partner Paul Robinson revealed he killed Gus Cleary, stating that she has a bad history of attraction to violent men.

Ruth Deller of entertainment website Lowculture praised Rebecca's character development stating: "Rebecca was such a badly-written, flaky character when she first arrived in Ramsay Street, but thankfully the scriptwriters soon realised just what an asset actress Jane Hall was to the show and turned her around to become awesome. As someone who can stand up to Paul Robinson (back to his best: being both a bit good and very bad) but yet also care for him, she has been a great addition and the chemistry between both characters has been a real tonic for the show."

Di Butler, writing for news.com.au, branded Rebecca's return "very significant." Butler added "Rebecca – looking terrific in a red dress and a great blow dry – doesn't know yet that Paul is mayor, because wherever she's come from doesn't have the internet."
