= James Sorensen =

PhD, medical researcher

- Born: 18 July 1986 (age 39); Bayswater, Melbourne, Australia
- Occupations: Actor; doctor; medical researcher
- Years active: 2004–present

James Sorensen (born 18 July 1986) is an Australian former professional model and actor. He is best known for portraying Declan Napier in the soap opera Neighbours. Sorensen served in the Australian Army in his early 20s. He completed his PhD in medical research in 2020 and his Doctorate of Medicine in 2022. He works as a medical doctor and medical researcher.

== Career ==
From 2004 to 2010, Sorensen worked as an actor and model.

During his final year at high school, Sorensen was cast in his first major role, Hating Alison Ashley. He also appeared in various children's programmes, including the lead role of Mike Kruze in the second season of children's drama series Blue Water High, broadcast in 2006. He had guest roles in Wicked Science and Satisfaction, and appeared in the short film Physical Graffiti, which was filmed in Melbourne.

In 2007, Sorensen joined the main cast of the television soap opera Neighbours as Declan Napier, brother of Oliver Barnes (David Hoflin) and son of Rebecca Napier, (Jane Hall). On 30 January 2010, it was confirmed that Sorensen was departing Neighbours, but his character would be recast as the producers were not yet ready to write him out of the show. It was later revealed that Sorensen quit Neighbours to join the Australian army, but he revealed in an interview that he would return to acting "at some point down the track".

Sorensen joined the Australian Army School of Infantry, Special Forces Training Centre at the Lone Pine Barracks. However, he suffered an accident during exercises, which left him with two cracked vertebrae in his back. Unable to continue with training, Sorensen was left in "limbo" as his medical discharge was estimated to take 18 months. He told David Knox of TV Tonight that he decided to return home to Melbourne to continue his recovery.

In January 2011, Sorensen's former Neighbours co-star Jane Hall revealed that he had become a professional photographer. That same year, he joined the cast of television action miniseries Conspiracy 365. Sorensen plays Jake, who helps to track fugitive Callum Ormond (Harrison Gilbertson). He also began working as a personal trainer while studying for a nursing diploma. He had plans to complete a master's degree in surgery with a view to working in Paramedicine.

Sorensen completed his PhD in medical research (Paediatric Oncology) at Victoria University and the Australian Institute for Musculoskeletal Science (AIMSS) in 2020 where he was awarded multiple awards including the Vice Chancellors PhD Scholarship, an AIMSS research grant and was nominated for Victorian Young Person of the Year for science and engineering. He also completed a Bachelor of Biomedical Science degree with Honours in 2015 at Victoria University. Sorensen completed his medical doctorate in 2022 and works as a doctor at The Alfred Hospital in Melbourne.

== Personal life ==
Sorensen was born in Bayswater, Melbourne. His father is Danish and his mother is Portuguese. He has a twin sister and a brother, who is six years younger. Sorensen is a keen photographer and also enjoys keeping fit by cycling. He has participated in The Great Victorian Bike Ride twice. Sorensen plays futsal in his spare time and also enjoys travel. He has been playing the piano since he was four years old.
