= Erin Mullally =

Australian actor and model (born 1990)

- Born: 2 January 1990 (age 36); Sydney, Australia
- Occupations: Model, actor
- Years active: 2009–present

Erin Mullally (born 2 January 1990) is an Australian actor and model best known for playing the role of Declan Napier in Neighbours. Mullally was cast in the role after original actor, James Sorensen, left the show. The character of Declan is Mullally's first major television role. After less than a year with Neighbours, it was announced that Mullally was to leave the show in March 2011.

== Career ==
Mullally was a model. He began his acting career in 2009, and he starred in two films. He played the part of Terry Logan in the 2009 film Resistance, and the part of Rafael in the film Ice in 2010.

On 30 January 2010, Holy Soap announced that the Neighbours character, Declan Napier had been recast and Mullally was given the role. Mullally was asked to audition for Neighbours, but he was not told which role he was auditioning for. Mullally said that he assumed it was for a new character coming onto the show. A couple of days later, Mullally was informed that he had auditioned for the role of Declan and he had been successful. Mullally's first scenes began airing in May 2010.

Mullally has made a comparison between the two versions of Declan stating "One of the writers said to me in a meeting the other day that the changeover between James and me can be best described as James playing Declan as very strong, macho. He liked to get into things and was very proactive. The new Declan is more grown up, quite mature and savvy. He thinks with his head and knows what he wants and doesn't have to use brute force to get it". Commenting on the recast, Mullally said: "James was definitely one of the most popular characters that Neighbours has ever had, which is why the producers wanted to retain the Declan role. Obviously there are going to be fans who aren't happy and, I'll be honest, I didn't set out to win over any James Sorensen fans because they are going to make up their mind. Eventually I will attract my own fanbase".

In October 2010, it was announced that Mullally would be leaving Neighbours after less than a year in the role of Declan. The following year, Mullally joined the cast of Network Ten's children's series Lightning Point, in a recurring role. Mullally appeared in Home and Away as Nathan Cunningham on 7 February 2012. The actor appears in Kath & Kimderella as Prince Juleo.

In 2014, Jonathon Moran from The Daily Telegraph reported that Mullally had become involved with a local Hare Krishna community, through his job at a Sydney café.

== Filmography ==
Year	Title	Role	Notes
2010–11	Neighbours	Declan Napier	Regular role: 125 episodes
2011	Ice	Rafael	
2012	Home and Away	Nathan Cunningham	
2012	Arc	Aaron	Short film
2012	Lightning Point	Josh	
2012	Kath & Kimderella	Prince Julio	
