= Rani Kapoor =

- Neighbours character
- Portrayed by: Coco Cherian
- Duration: 2012–2013
- First appearance: 1 February 2012
- Last appearance: 2 October 2013
- Introduced by: Susan Bower
In-universe information
- Occupation: Student; Nursery assistant
- Father: Ajay Kapoor
- Mother: Priya Kapoor

Rani Kapoor is a fictional character from the Australian television soap opera Neighbours, played by Coco Cherian. The actress was a fan of the serial, before she successfully auditioned for the role of Rani. Her casting was officially announced on 7 December 2011 at the same time it was revealed that her on-screen parents would be promoted to regular cast members. The Kapoor's arrival marked the show's first family with Indian and Sri Lankan heritage. They also became the first family to be introduced since 2010. Cherian made her first screen appearance as Rani during the episode broadcast on 1 February 2012. In May 2013, it was confirmed that Cherian had left Neighbours and Rani made her screen exit on 2 October 2013.

Rani is the teenage daughter of Ajay (Sachin Joab) and Priya Kapoor (Menik Gooneratne). She is a typical high school student, who wants to be popular. She is smart and also "a girlie girl", a trait that Cherian can identify with. Rani begins her first relationship with Harley Canning (Justin Holborow) and Cherian stated that her character had really fallen for him and wanted the "whole fairytale". However, she became the centre of a love triangle between Harley and her friend, Callum Jones (Morgan Baker). Rani becomes distraught when she discovers that her mother might have had an affair with Paul Robinson (Stefan Dennis). Once she had evidence of the affair, she exposed it to her father.

== Casting ==
Cherian told a writer for Dolly that she had been a fan of Neighbours for many years, so she was "excited" to learn from her agent that she had an audition with the serial. Cherian was called back for a second audition, where she was introduced to Kaiya Jones and Morgan Baker who portray Sophie Ramsay and Callum Jones respectively. Weeks later, Cherian was out shopping when she received a call from her mother, who told her that she had been offered the role of Rani. The actress said "It was such an amazing and unforgettable moment and nothing's been the same since." Cherian has an on-set tutor to help keep up with her school work during filming. She also revealed that getting to know the cast was one of her favourite parts of working on the show.

The character and Cherian's casting was officially announced on 7 December 2011. It was also revealed that Rani's parents, Ajay (Sachin Joab) and Priya Kapoor (Menik Gooneratne), would be promoted to the regular cast in early 2012. The Kapoors became the first family to be introduced to Neighbours since the Williams' arrived in 2010. The show's then executive producer, Susan Bower, stated "I'm delighted by how the Kapoors have been introduced. Viewers already know them because of their role in the community and link with other characters, and their cultural background is secondary." Bower added that having a family of Indian and Sri Lankan heritage join the neighbourhood was very exciting. Cherian made her debut as Rani on 1 February 2012.

== Development ==
=== Characterisation ===
Rani is the teenage daughter of Ajay and Priya Kapoor. Before her introduction, Rani was often mentioned by the other teenage characters to give her immediate connections within the community. Cherian called Rani "a typical high school girl", who wants to be popular. She likes romantic movies and is a fan of the boy band One Direction. Gooneratne called Rani "a smart girl", who is "certainly her mother's daughter!" Cherian stated that Rani is also "a girlie girl", something that she herself could identify with. Rani finds employment at the local plant nursery alongside friend and neighbour, Callum Jones

=== Love triangle ===
In September 2012, Rani met Harley Canning (Justin Holborow) and became the centre of a love triangle between him and Callum. Holborow said that the romance with Rani makes Harley want to stay in Ramsay Street. He added "This girl has changed his life, but it's complicated." Rani eventually begins dating Harley and Cherian told Jackie Brygel from TV Week "She's a hopeless romantic. She wants the whole fairytale and she's really fallen for Harley." Rani's first kiss with Harley occurs while they are taking a walk near Lassiter's Lake. The scene marked Cherian's first on-screen kiss and she admitted "It was pretty nerve-racking. It was night-time and we were both cold and shivering." The actress sought advice from her co-stars before filming the scene.

Rani's first kiss soon leads to more at school, where her mother catches her and Harley together. Brygel noted that Priya "will be dishing out more than just a detention after finding out exactly what her daughter's been up to." Rani is unaware that Callum has developed a crush on her and was heartbroken when he learned that she was dating someone else. Charian stated that Rani has been blind to Callum's feelings and has not picked up on anything at all. Talking to Susan Hill from the Daily Star, a show spokesperson revealed that while Callum could give up on Rani, he decides to imitate Harley's "bad boy" ways instead in a bid to impress her. Rani does not know what is going on with Callum when he develops an attitude.

=== Priya's affair and death ===
When Rani helps her father to plant some presents around the Lassiter's Complex for a treasure hunt, she witnesses her mother in an embrace with Paul Robinson (Stefan Dennis). Cherian told an Inside Soap reporter that Rani is in "total shock" at what she has seen, especially as Paul is her parent' nemesis. Of her reaction, Cherian said "Rani thinks: 'Oh, my God! What did I just see?' She's not exactly sure - it might have just been a hug, but she has suspicions that it was something more intimate. She feels stunned, confused and enraged that her mother would even touch Paul Robinson." Rani eventually finds the courage to confront her mother, who tells her that she was just comforting Paul because he was upset about his son's epilepsy diagnosis. Cherian commented that Rani really wants to believe the story, but when Priya start buying her gifts, she realises something is not quite right. Rani comes to the conclusion that her mother may be having an affair with Paul, which leaves her "distraught".

Ajay notices the change in her mood and becomes concerned about her. When he talks to Rani, she decides not to tell him what she is thinking, especially as she is not a hundred per cent sure about what she saw. When Rani learns that a pair of her mother's gold earrings were found in a Lassiter's Hotel room, her suspicions that she was having an affair are reignited. Rani then steals Paul's phone and reads "raunchy texts" sent between him and Priya. Rani is "stunned", but instead of confronting her mother, she decides to go off with Harley without telling anyone. Rani later exposes her mother's affair with Paul to her father. Joab told Daniel Kilkelly from Digital Spy "At first Ajay thinks his daughter is lying to hurt her mother. Priya and Rani haven't been getting along, so he puts it down initially to teenage angst. But when Priya has to choose between calling her daughter a liar and admitting the truth, she realises she has to come clean. Ajay is obviously devastated."

A few months later, Ajay forgives Priya, but Rani struggles to come to terms with what has happened and is not "so easily won over". During Sonya (Eve Morey) and Toadie's (Ryan Moloney) wedding reception, Rani and Priya have "a trivial fight" over the dress that Priya has brought for Rani. Rani leaves the reception and when Priya goes to send her a text message, a gas explosion causes the marquee to collapse, trapping her inside. While Priya is rushed to hospital in a serious condition, Rani is unaware of what has happened until Kyle Canning (Chris Milligan) finds her and brings her to the hospital. Priya dies from her injuries and Rani goes into "shutdown mode" and keeps her emotions to herself. A week after her mother's death, Rani sees Priya's ghost sitting on their couch. Cherian explained "Rani is feeling guilty, as the last time they spoke, she told Priya she hated her. She didn't get the chance to tell her how much she loves her, and she almost feels that her mum didn't love her back. The ghost is a way for Rani to attempt to find some closure on the whole situation."

Cherian stated that Rani is calm and appears comfortable with her mother's appearance. She even talks to her, which the actress thought was "a little bit odd". Priya's ghost appears to Rani again and Rani continues to talk to her, even though she is unresponsive. Gooneratne said that for Rani, it is a way of trying to find closure. Susan Kennedy (Jackie Woodburne) and Callum soon notice that Rani has become withdrawn and they try unsuccessfully to get her to open up. Ajay also realises that he has forgotten to make Rani his number one priority. Rani opens up to Ajay, telling him that she feels guilty for the way she and her mother left things, but she does not tell him about the visions. Cherian added "Rani doesn't want him to think she's going crazy. He's also got his own problems – she's seen how much Priya's death has affected her dad and so she doesn't want to put any more stress on him or burden him with her own issues." Ajay reassures Rani that Priya did love her, but Priya's ghost appears once more, making it obvious Rani is still feeling guilty.

=== Departure ===
On 1 May 2013, it was confirmed that Cherian had left Neighbours. She filmed her final scenes on 30 April. Cherian tweeted that she would miss the cast and crew, while executive producer Richard Jasek told Daniel Kilkelly from Digital Spy "It's very special when someone joins the Neighbours family as a youngster and then to have the privilege of watching them grow into an extraordinary young adult. We have all adored working with Coco and like all our characters, we hope there will be an opportunity with our stories for Rani to make a return visit to Ramsay Street." Rani initially departed with Ajay on 12 July 2013. The pair were planning a trip to India with the insurance payout from Priya's death, but when Ajay learns his grandmother is seriously ill, he decides to leave immediately to be with her. Rani is surprised when Ajay tells her that she is not going with him, as he believes she has been through enough. Cherian commented "But Rani wants to support her dad, and she feels that she's simply being dumped." Rani points out that she needs to be with her family and Ajay eventually agrees she can come. Rani made a brief return from 27 September.

== Storylines ==
Rani joins Erinsborough High when her mother becomes the principal. Callum Jones initially judges Rani, calling her a nerd and the principal's pet. However, he later tells her that she is cooler than he first thought and they become friends. When Sophie Ramsay runs away from home, Rani helps to hide her in her bedroom. Callum discovers where Sophie is and urges her to go home, while Rani agrees. Callum later tells Sophie's uncle where she is and Rani reassures him that he did the right thing. Rani and Sophie sneak out to attend a house party at Number 32, which gets out of hand. When Sophie's uncle, Paul Robinson, learns that they were there, he briefly bans them from seeing each other. Callum realises that Sophie has tried to turn him and Rani against each other because she is jealous of their friendship. They get revenge on her by pretending to date and annoying her with their romantic behaviour. Callum turns on Rani when Ajay begins representing his biological father, Troy Miller (Dieter Brummer) in a custody case. When Troy dies, Rani helps support Callum and they make up. Rani is embarrassed when she has to wear glasses, until Priya buys her some new ones and Ajay reassures her they look okay.

Rani develops a crush on Harley Canning and decides to get contact lenses, so she can catch his attention. After a night out with friends, Rani and Harley share their first kiss. Priya later catches them kissing at school and calls Rani cheap, before telling Harley to stay away. She later relents and Rani begins dating Harley. Rani witnesses her mother in an embrace with Paul and when she confronts her, Priya tells her that she was just comforting Paul. Rani begins to suspect that her mother is having an affair, especially when she learns that her earrings were found in a hotel room. She later steals Paul's phone and finds texts from him and Priya detailing their time together. A devastated Rani then decides to go to a party in Frankston with Harley. However, Ajay shows up at the bus stop and takes her home. Rani tells him that Priya has been having an affair with Paul, but Ajay does not believe her. Priya then admits the truth. Rani tells Sophie that she hates her mother and later cuts up her clothes and begins ignoring her. She posts a derogatory message about her mother on Facebook, causing Priya to give her two weeks detention. Rani initially refuses to attend the detention, but Ajay tells her that he agrees with Priya's punishment and takes her back to school.

Rani learns that a Facebook page has been set up to bad mouth her family and tells Ajay. She later vandalises Lassiter's Hotel with some graffiti about Paul. Sergeant Matt Turner (Josef Brown) is prevented from questioning her by Ajay. Paul later decides not to presses charges. Ajay and Priya tell Rani that she must work at Lassiter's for two days as punishment. Rani befriends Bailey Turner (Calen Mackenzie) at a street barbecue and he later apologises for his father's involvement in her punishment. Priya's relationship with Ajay improves, but Rani remains reluctant to forgive her. When Priya buys Rani a dress she does not like for Sonya and Toadie's wedding, Rani become angry with Priya. During the reception, they argue and Rani leaves. When she receives an unfinished text message from Priya, Rani tells Sophie that she hates her mother. Kyle Canning finds Rani and tells her there has been an accident and Priya is in the hospital. Rani joins Ajay at her mother's bedside and they are told that Priya will not wake up. Rani and Ajay say their goodbyes to Priya, before she dies. Rani is devastated, but hides her grief around others. She also feels guilty because the last thing she told Priya was that she hated her.

Rani starts seeing and talking to Priya's ghost. After finding Priya's journal, Rani learns how much Priya loved her and stops seeing her ghost. Callum asks Rani out and they begin dating. Rani decides to produce a play written by her mother and casts both Callum and Bailey in the main roles. Rani develops feeling for Bailey and they kiss during a rehearsal. Rani feels guilty about betraying Callum and tells him the truth. Angered, Callum drops out of the play and refuses to speak to Rani. She rewrites the ending of the play, so that her character and his end up together, and Callum returns. The play is a success and Rani briefly sees Priya again. Callum asks Rani to stop speaking to Bailey if she wants to get back together with him and she agrees. When Callum realises that Rani still has feelings for Bailey, he helps them get together. Wanting to go on the pill, Rani turns to Susan Kennedy for help. Ajay assumes that Rani is planning on having sex with Bailey, but Rani tells him that she is experiencing bad period pains. While Ajay and Rani plan a holiday to India, Ajay learns that his grandmother is terminally ill and decides to leave immediately. Ajay arranges for Rani to stay with the Kennedys, but she refuses to remain behind without him. Rani says goodbye to Callum and Bailey, who tells Rani he loves her, and she and Ajay leave Ramsay Street. A couple of months later, Rani returns without Ajay to sort things out and pack up their belongings. Rani tells Bailey that she and Ajay are moving to London and she breaks up with him. Bailey then tries to win an overseas scholarship to join her in London, but Rani tells him that she does not want him to come over. She admits that she met someone else while she was in India and it made her realise that she needs to move on with her life. Rani says her goodbyes and leaves.

== Reception ==
Following the announcement that the Kapoor family would become regular cast members, several racist posts were left on the Neighbours website and had to be removed by staff. Bower said most of the inappropriate comments, from viewers expressing their anger at a non-Anglo-Saxon family being introduced to the show, came from a "small minority". She later commented that for every negative comment about the family there were ten to fifteen positive ones. Joab spoke out about the issue, saying "There is various pockets that will say it is un-Australian to have an Indian or an Indian family on Ramsay St. Those Aussies who are saying it is un-Australian will be the same ones who pretty much supported the White Australia policy back in the day, you are never going to get away from that kind of stuff." Joab added having a show, which portrays different families coming together could only be a good thing for the community.

For her portrayal of Rani, Cherian was included on the long-list for the 2013 Most Popular New Female Talent Logie Award. In late January 2013, Dianne Butler from News.com.au commented "I wonder if it isn't time Rani wasn't sent away for a spell ... the asylum on American Horror Story?" While reviewing an episode that featured Rani grieving for her mother, Melinda Houston from The Sun-Herald wrote "Coco Cherian puts in a terrific performance as Rani. It's all surprisingly engaging."
