= Jen Handley =

- Neighbours character
- Portrayed by: Alyce Platt
- Duration: 1995–1996
- First appearance: 14 February 1995
- Last appearance: 6 March 1996
In-universe information
- Occupation: Medical student; Artist; Bartender
- Brothers: Luke Handley
- Sisters: Morgan Handley
- First cousins: Sarah

Jen Handley is a fictional character from the Australian television soap opera Neighbours, played by Alyce Platt. Jen was introduced at a time when Network Ten was working to relaunch the serial with the addition of new characters and sexier storylines to improve ratings. She made her first on-screen appearance on 14 February 1995. Jen is portrayed as an easy-going, fun loving medical student. Jen embarks upon a relationship with widower Philip Martin (Ian Rawlings), who gives her much-needed stability in her life. Her brother, Luke Handley (Bernard Curry), was later introduced to the series. Platt believed a storyline in which Jen is asked to donate a kidney to her cousin was a turning point for the character, as it gave her own identity beyond a supporting role. Jen's final scenes aired on 6 March 1996. Platt later returned to Neighbours as an unrelated character, Olivia Bell, in 2012, 2020 and 2021.

== Casting ==
In December 1994, Rachel Browne of The Sun-Herald reported Platt had joined the cast of Neighbours as Jen Handley, a mature age medical student. Platt's introduction coincided with Network Ten's relaunch of the soap. The network decided to add new faces and sexier storylines in a bid to improve ratings. Jen was Platt's first full-time screen part since she left Sons and Daughters in 1985. The actress revealed she found getting back into the "swing of acting" a tough challenge and she was dissatisfied with her early performance. Platt's first scenes as Jen began airing from early 1995.

== Development ==
Jen is described as being easy-going, laid back and fun loving. Jen's university friend, Cody Willis (Peta Brady) introduces her to widower Philip Martin (Ian Rawlings). Jen likes Philip, but she finds it a struggle to get him to go out with her. Philip cannot believe Jen is interested in him and he thinks that she simply feels sorry for him because he is a single father. Philip then embarks on a series of random dates, which makes Jen determined to win him over. Jen eventually persuades Philip to go out with her and they begin a "passionate" relationship. Platt told a writer for Inside Soap that she found her kissing scenes with Rawlings easy as they were co-stars in Sons and Daughters together. Platt also revealed Jen would undergo a personality change due to her relationship with Philip. She explained "Unlike me, Jen is quite an unstable person, but Philip provides the much-needed stability in her life. He's very different to every other guy that she's ever been out with and that's part of the attraction for her." Platt also added that she was concerned for her character's future, saying Jen was not a trailblazer in terms of storylines and it felt like she was just there for the benefit of Philip, with no identity of her own.

Jen manages to befriend Philip's daughter, Hannah (Rebecca Ritters), by acting as her confidant, rather than a replacement for her late mother. Jen's "moody" brother Luke (Bernard Curry) later arrives in Ramsay Street and makes Jen wish she had not given him her address, by breaking the hearts of several women. Brook Allen (Felix Nobis), Jen's ex-boyfriend, turns up and his presence threatens Jen's relationship with Philip. A writer for Inside Soap said Jen starts to wonder is a curse is hanging over her. A few weeks later, Jen receives a letter from her cousin, Sarah, who tells her she needs a kidney transplant and Jen is a match. Jen then has to make "a terrible decision" as the last time she was placed under a general anaesthetic she almost lost her life. Platt said the storyline proved to be a turning point for Jen, whom she had considered a supporting character. The actress explained "She was there mainly for the benefit of Philip, which made it difficult for her to have any identity of her own." Platt left Neighbours in 1996 and she told Sue Malins of the Daily Mirror "In the end, I don't think the scriptwriters knew what to do with me." On screen, Jen departed Erinsborough to pursue an art scholarship, following the breakdown of her relationship with Philip.

== Storylines ==
Jen begins a medical class at Eden Hills University and she makes friends with Cody Willis. Jen reveals the reason she is studying medicine is to research Aplastic anemia, which killed her younger sister, Morgan. She wants to prevent others from suffering in the same way. Cody introduces Jen to Philip Martin, whose wife, Julie (Julie Mullins), had died several months earlier. Jen and Philip begin dating after several hurdles and they earn Philip's daughter, Hannah's blessing. Jen becomes scared of how fast the relationship is moving and she fears she is losing her independence, forcing Philip to back off. Their relationship soon resumes.

When Brook, Jen's ex-boyfriend arrives in Erinsborough, Philip feels threatened as Brook is closer to Jen's age than he is. Jen sees that Philip is constantly trying to change his image to keep up with Brook and she tells him to remain himself and Brook soon leaves. Philip later asks Jen to move in with him and Hannah. Jen begin sleepwalking and is nearly run over by Kevin Rebecchi's (Don Bridges) truck. She soon realises she that is under stress from exams. Things are not helped when during a relaxation break Jen becomes obsessed with a daytime soap opera.

Jen's relationship with Philip ultimately crumbles after it becomes evident that she wants out after behaving mysteriously. Philip's son Michael (Troy Beckwith) returns at Christmas and warns Jen off any attempt at a reconciliation. Jen then moves into Number 30 with her brother, Luke and Cody. She gets a job at Chez Chez as a barmaid. After a brief relationship with James Grimmer (Matthew Parkinson), Jen decides to leave Ramsay Street to pursue an art scholarship. She and Philip reconcile and after an emotional goodbye with Luke and Cody, Philip drives her to the airport. When Cody is killed a few weeks later, Jen sends a message to her memorial service describing Cody as her best friend.

== Reception ==
The BBC said Jen's most notable moment was "Offering a kidney to her cousin." In 1996, a columnist for Inside Soap said Jen brought a "breath of fresh air into Erinsborough the day she arrived". They added Jen had become one of the brightest, most popular personalities to appear for a while.
