= List of Neighbours characters introduced in 2012 =

Neighbours is an Australian television soap opera. It was first broadcast on 18 March 1985 and currently airs on digital channel Eleven. The following is a list of characters that first appeared in the soap in 2012, by order of first appearance. Until May, characters were introduced by the soap's executive producer, Susan Bower. Thereafter, they were introduced by her successor, Richard Jasek. The 28th season of Neighbours began airing on 9 January 2012. Four-piece indie band William and the Tells made their debut as Red Cotton in the same month, while Toby Wallace made his debut as Corey O'Donahue. Dominic Emmerson and Rani Kapoor began appearing from February. Vanessa Villante arrived in March, while Sheila Canning, Bernard Cabello and Zoe Alexander made their debuts from May. Ed Lee arrived in June. Alex Delpy and Dale Madden appeared in August. Harley Canning and Bradley Fox arrived in September, while Georgia Brooks, Francesca Villante and Father Guidotti made their debuts in October. Monica Wetherby appeared in November. Scotty Boland and Patrick Villante began appearing from December.

== Red Cotton ==
Red Cotton
- Neighbours character
- Portrayed by: William and the Tells
- First appearance: 16 January 2012
- Last appearance: 28 May 2012
- Introduced by: Susan Bower
In-universe information
- Occupation: Musicians

Red Cotton, played by real life band William and the Tells, made their first on screen appearance on 16 January 2012. The band's casting was announced on 21 September 2011. William and the Tells are a four piece indie group from Melbourne fronted by siblings William and Pete Ewing, with their friends Ben Callaghan and Sam Walsh. The group were renamed Red Cotton for their guest stint with the show. William Ewing told Clare Quirk of The Warrnambool Standard that a friend revealed Neighbours were looking for a band and that they had auditioned seventy already, but none of them could act. Musician, Pete Ewing told Neighbours that William could act and they were given the role of Red Cotton six weeks later. The band members began filming their first scenes the week following the casting announcement. Of joining the show, William Ewing said "It's a huge opportunity for a bunch of local boys. Being able to blend acting and music will be great fun, and I'm looking forward to meeting long-time hero Lou Carpenter." William and the Tells performed their own material when they appeared as Red Cotton. Their storyline saw Andrew Robinson (Jordan Patrick Smith) become their manager.

Andrew Robinson gets in contact with Griffin O'Donahue (William Ewing) and his band, Red Cotton, and arranges for them to play a gig at Eden Hills University. Andrew then tries to get the band to sign with him. Andrew persuades Griffin and Red Cotton to film a music video at Erinsborough High. Griffin is unhappy when Sophie Ramsay (Kaiya Jones) turns up, as he believes she dated his younger brother, Corey (Toby Wallace), to get closer to the band. Sophie apologises for hurting Corey, but explains she did not date him to get to the band. Sophie halts the music video and explains the band need more attitude, which Griffin agrees with. However, she gets carried away and wrecks the bathroom they are filming in. Griffin meets Andrew in Charlie's and gives him the bill for the broken guitar. Andrew tells Griffin the music video is ready and Griffin likes what he sees. He agrees to speak to the rest of the group about Andrew becoming their manager. Griffin tells Andrew to find them a label and a producer so they can make a record. Andrew manages to secure the band a month-long residency at Charlie's and the first gig sells out. Griffin comes to Andrew and tells him he and the band have been asking around, and the deal they have is not fair. Griffin explains that the band will not play unless they are paid more. Andrew eventually agrees to give them more money and the band play the gig. Red Cotton play another gig at Charlie's. Griffin asks Natasha Williams (Valentina Novakovic) out, but she tells him she has a boyfriend and encourages him to ask Summer Hoyland (Jordy Lucas) out instead. Griffin talks to Summer and they kiss at the end of the night. Griffin and the band are not happy when Andrew starts managing The Right Prescription and moves their gig to another night. Summer and Griffin begin dating, but Andrew learns Griffin is seeing other girls at the same time. Andrew asks Griffin to tell Summer, but he refuses, so Andrew drops the band. Summer later learns Griffin is seeing other girls and she breaks up with him. Red Cotton later find new management and get a record deal.

== Corey O'Donahue ==
Corey O'Donahue
- Neighbours character
- Portrayed by: Toby Wallace
- First appearance: 16 January 2012
- Last appearance: 1 February 2012
- Introduced by: Susan Bower
In-universe information
- Occupation: Student
- Brothers: Griffin O'Donahue

Corey O'Donahue, played by Toby Wallace, made his first on screen appearance on 16 January 2012. Wallace's casting was announced in December 2011 and he had a one-month guest contract with the show. Of his casting, Wallace told TV Week "I grew up in England and Neighbours is quite big there, so when I got the part it was really weird." The actor revealed he had to change his appearance quite a lot for the role. Corey has "a funky-looking" hairstyle and he wears earrings.

Describing his character, Wallace said "Corey's brother is in a band, and he sees him as a really cool person. Corey wants to follow in his footsteps, so he dresses like him and pretends he's into music and going to gigs. Underneath he's almost a geek, but he gets away with it because he's got this charm about him." When asked if he could relate to Corey, Wallace said he could, especially when it comes to lying about what music and movies he likes to the people he is with. Corey meets Sophie Ramsay (Kaiya Jones) at one of his brother's gigs and manages to win her over pretty quickly. Wallace said the characters click and Sophie really likes Corey. He added "But there's this wall between Sophie and Corey in that she doesn't really know who he is. She likes that mystery." Corey gives Sophie her first kiss and Wallace said he and Jones had to do the scene about fifteen times to film the different angles.

Corey goes to Eden Hills University to watch his brother, Griffin's (William Ewing), band play a gig. He meets Sophie Ramsay and they kiss. Andrew Robinson (Jordan Patrick Smith) breaks them up and orders Sophie to go home. Corey tells Andrew he and Sophie were just having a bit of fun and he asks for her number. Andrew refuses to give it to out and tells him to leave Sophie alone. Corey comes to meet Sophie and he reveals to Andrew that he is the younger brother of Griffin, Red Cotton's lead singer. Andrew then asks him whether the band have spoken to anyone about management. Corey and Sophie go to Harold's Store to hang out. They are interrupted by Paul Robinson (Stefan Dennis), who sends Sophie home. Andrew runs into Corey and encourages him to call Sophie. Corey goes on another date with Sophie and meets Callum Jones (Morgan Baker), and beginning talking about an online role playing game, which causes Sophie to lose interest in Corey. Corey is hurt when Sophie tells him they should break up. When Corey asks why, Sophie tells him she thought he would be more like his brother and into music. She also reveals Andrew wants to manage Red Cotton and Corey feels that she used him.

== Rani Kapoor ==
Rani Kapoor, played by Coco Cherian, made her debut screen appearance on 1 February 2012. The character and Cherian's casting was announced on 7 December 2011. Rani is the teenage daughter of Ajay (Sachin Joab) and Priya Kapoor (Menik Gooneratne). She is "a typical high school girl", who wants to be popular. Rani began a short relationship with Harley Canning (Justin Holborow), unaware that her friend, Callum Jones (Morgan Baker), had a crush on her. She later uncovered her mother's affair with Paul Robinson (Stefan Dennis), which left her "reeling".

== Dominic Emmerson ==
Dominic Emmerson
- Neighbours character
- Portrayed by: Lincoln Lewis
- First appearance: 3 February 2012
- Last appearance: 20 February 2012
- Introduced by: Susan Bower
In-universe information
- Occupation: Marine biologist

Dominic Emmerson, played by former Home and Away actor Lincoln Lewis, made his first on screen appearance on 3 February 2012. The character and Lewis' casting was announced on 24 September 2011. The actor had a four-week guest stint with Neighbours and of his casting he said "I've wanted to be on Neighbours since I was a little kid and finally it has happened." Lewis filmed his scenes alongside Ashleigh Brewer and Stefan Dennis on location in Port Douglas from 10 October. The shoot lasted for a week. Lewis and Brewer previously worked together on The Sleepover Club when they were twelve. Producers offered Lewis a one-year contract to remain in the show. He decided against signing up because he was already committed to working on other roles.

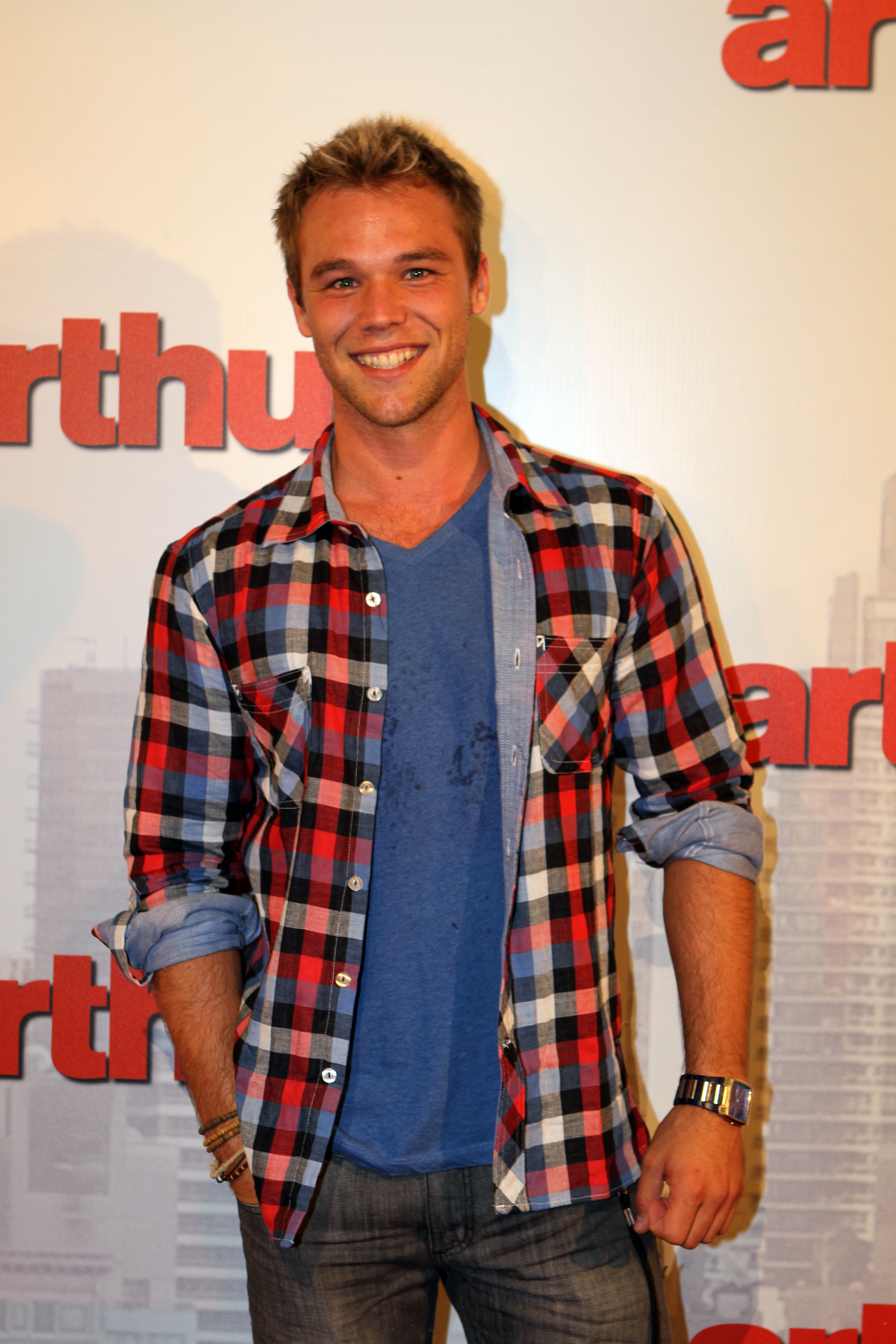
Lincoln Lewis plays Dominic Emmerson

Dominic is a marine biologist, who is described as being charismatic and a charmer. Of his character, Lewis explained "At the start, Dominic comes across as annoying but as time goes by you see it is just a cheeky persistence. He has a live-for-the-moment attitude. Nothing is too much drama for him." He also described the role as fun. Dominic meets Kate Ramsay (Brewer) after she escapes from Melbourne to Port Douglas and loses her phone on the beach. Dominic finds and returns it and a relationship sparks between them. Colin Vickery of The Advertiser said "At first Kate is suspicious of smooth-talking Dominic but slowly she melts." She finds he is the distraction she has been looking for and they have a holiday fling.

Dominic is walking along the beach when he discovers a mobile phone. When it rings, he answers it and speaks to Lucas Fitzgerald (Scott Major). He tries to tell him where he is, but the signal cuts out. Dominic is looking for the owner when Kate Ramsay calls him and tells him he has her phone. Dominic arranges for them to meet, but Kate is late. They successfully try again and Dominic asks Kate out to dinner. She turns him down and tries to grab her phone, but it falls into a swimming pool. Dominic comes across Kate on the beach and offers to show her around, but she turns him down. Dominic is being told off by a tourist for being late for their tour, when Kate appears and helps him out. To thank her, Dominic buys her lunch and they spend the day together. They later kiss on the beach. Dominic and Kate go on a rainforest walk together and Kate tells him she really likes him. Dominic quits his job, so he can accompany Kate to Vietnam. Kate explains to Dominic that her younger sister is in trouble and her uncle wants her to come back home. Dominic tells that it is okay if she wants to leave and that their time together has been fun, but Kate stays. Dominic and Kate prepare to leave for Vietnam, but Kate changes her mind and reveals she needs to go home. Dominic and Kate say goodbye on the beach.

Vickery praised the actor, saying "Lewis brings a wonderful lightness of touch to his Neighbours role." Cameron Adams of the Herald Sun called Dominic "the embodiment of a holiday romance for unlucky-in-love Kate." A reporter for the Sunday Mercury called Dominic "a roguish stranger", with a "mischievous personality."

== Vanessa Villante ==
Vanessa Villante, played by Alin Sumarwata, made her debut screen appearance on 14 March 2012. The character and Sumarwata's casting was announced on 5 December 2011. Vanessa is a professional chef and Sumarwata commented that she shares a similar love for food with her. A writer for Channel 5 said "Anything but a wallflower, it seems that Vanessa will cook up a storm in more than one sense of the word, embracing life to the full and turning the world on its head for one of Ramsay Street's male residents." A reporter for TV Week called Vanessa "a temptress", "a glamazon" and "volatile". Vanessa has a one-night stand with Lucas and then returns a few weeks later to tell him that she is pregnant with his child. When asked which new character viewers should be looking out for in 2012, executive producer Richard Jasek chose Vanessa, saying she would take Erinsborough by storm.

== Bossy ==
Bossy
- Neighbours character
- Portrayed by: Bossy
- Duration: 2012–2016
- First appearance: 23 April 2012
- Last appearance: 8 April 2016
- Introduced by: Susan Bower
- Spin-off appearances: Neighbours vs Zombies (2014)
- Species: Dog
- Breed: Australian Kelpie
In-universe information
- Owners: Kyle Canning; Jade Mitchell; Georgia Brooks

Bossy is an Australian Kelpie owned by Kyle Canning (Chris Milligan). She made her first screen appearance on 23 April 2012. Following the death of Cairn terrier Audrey, producers wanted to introduce another dog to the show, and they thought Milligan's character would be an ideal companion for it. Bossy's arrival was announced on 1 February 2012, and she started filming that same day. Bossy was nine weeks old when she began filming. In June 2013, new pictures of Bossy were released, showing her at 16 months. Bossy's trainer, Sally Willis, commented that the dog shared "a special bond" with Milligan and often singled him out at the studio. Bossy departed on 8 April 2016, along with Kyle, following Milligan's decision to leave the show. When Milligan returned to the show in 2019, Bossy was not reintroduced and she continued to live with Kyle's ex-wife, Georgia Brooks (Saskia Hampele), in Germany. Milligan was pleased with the decision as he said that scenes would take longer to shoot with Bossy. A year later, Bossy dies off-screen. After she is given a terminal diagnosis, Kyle visits her in Germany, where she dies. On 28 March 2021, Animal Actors announced that the real Bossy had died following an illness.

Bossy is introduced when Sonya Mitchell (Eve Morey) and Toadfish Rebecchi (Ryan Moloney) ask Kyle to drive them to a local animal shelter to choose a dog. Kyle ends up adopting the puppy Sonya and Toadie like and gives her to his then girlfriend, Jade Mitchell (Gemma Pranita), for her birthday, Milligan admitted that Kyle should have checked with Jade to see if she was "a dog person" first. Milligan also said: "Bossy, and that's her real name, is a pure bred Australian Kelpie, one of the smartest breeds you'll find. She is an absolute scene stealer and I'm surprised she can actually walk, she is picked up for cuddles so often by the cast and crew and carried everywhere." When Bossy is attacked and has to wear "the cone of shame", Kate White from Inside Soap said "our hearts go out to poor Bossy in Neighbours, who was in the wars this week. Get better soon, girl!" In August 2014, after Bossy is bitten by a snake, White commented that "no UK soap managed a more emotional story this week". During the week commencing 20 July 2015, Melinda Houston of The Sydney Morning Herald said her highlight of the show's episodes was "surely watching red kelpie Bossy silently but forcefully demanding to be fed a chip."

Following a car accident, Bossy is cared for by Astrid Quinn (Michelle O'Grady). Kyle Canning, Sonya Mitchell and Toadfish Rebecchi come to the animal shelter and they all befriend Bossy. Kyle later returns and adopts her. He gives her to his girlfriend, Jade Mitchell, for her birthday. The couple initially struggle to come up with a name for her, but they later settle on Bossy. After Jade leaves for Los Angeles, Bossy remains with Kyle and often accompanies him to his builder's yard. Bossy also befriends Kyle's housemate Chris Pappas (James Mason). Bossy suffers a leg injury when she is bitten by Napoleon, a Jack Russell owned by Will Dempier (Christian Heath). A few months later, during a walk with Georgia Brooks (Saskia Hampele), Bossy runs away and is bitten by a tiger snake. Bossy is given the antidote by a vet and is sent home to recover. Kyle discovers Bossy has been stealing underwear from the neighbours' washing lines, leaving him to try and replace the garments. Bossy begins snapping at people and Kyle realises she could be unwell. When Jimmy Williams (Darcy Tadich) tries to stop her running off, Bossy bites him. After the council receive a complaint about the incident, Bossy is impounded, pending an investigation. She is later released back to Kyle following a hearing, but she soon bites him. Kyle learns from the vet that Bossy has a brain tumour, which is causing her unusual behaviour. He realises that he cannot afford to pay for her surgery and will have to have her put to sleep. Amy Williams (Zoe Cramond) speaks to the vet, who agrees to perform the surgery in exchange for some building and landscaping work. Bossy recovers well from the surgery, and she later leaves with Kyle for Germany. Although Kyle returns to Erinsborough in 2019, Bossy remains in Germany with Georgia. The following year, Georgia calls Kyle to tell him that Bossy's tumour has returned and her condition is terminal. Kyle flies to Germany to see her one last time and Bossy dies a few days later.

== Sheila Canning ==
Sheila Canning, played by Colette Mann, made her debut screen appearance on 3 May 2012. The character and Mann's casting was announced on 7 February 2012. The actress previously appeared in Neighbours in 1995 as Cheryl Stark, temporarily taking over the role from Caroline Gillmer. Sheila is Kyle Canning's (Chris Milligan) grandmother. She is over-affectionate, "much-loved and very opinionated." Andrew Mercado, writing for TV Week, said Sheila would leave "more than a few ruffled feathers in her wake" following her arrival. Daniel Kilkelly of Digital Spy reported sparks would fly when Sheila meets Kyle's girlfriend, Jade Mitchell (Gemma Pranita). The two women do not hit it off and a Neighbours spokesperson told Susan Hill of the Daily Star that Sheila would do anything for Kyle, which "rubs Jade up the wrong way."

== Bernard Cabello ==
Bernard Cabello
- Neighbours character
- Portrayed by: Bruce Alexander
- First appearance: 11 May 2012
- Last appearance: 15 May 2012
- Introduced by: Richard Jasek
In-universe information
- Occupation: Yoga teacher

Bernard Cabello, played by Bruce Alexander, made his first screen appearance on 11 May 2012. The character was announced on 15 April 2012. Bernard was introduced as a potential love interest for Susan Kennedy (Jackie Woodburne). Bernard meets Susan at a yoga class that she has decided to try out. The Daily Star's Susan Hill said Susan is "taken aback" when Bernard asks her out for a drink and she initially turns him down, but as she is leaving the gym, she changes her mind and accepts the offer. Bernard and Susan go to see her ex-husband, Karl Kennedy's (Alan Fletcher) band for their date. A show spokesperson told Hill "Susan has already agreed to be at the gig for moral support and doesn't think twice about taking Bernard along with her."

Bernard holds a yoga class at the local community centre, which is attended by Susan Kennedy and Summer Hoyland (Jordy Lucas). Bernard later meets them in Harold's Store and Susan tells him she enjoyed his class. Bernard reveals that he has been teaching yoga for ten years and that he used to be an architect. He asks Susan out for a drink, but she turns him down due to work commitments. The following day, Susan asks Bernard out for dinner. She later asks him if they can attend the performance of her ex-husband's band at Charlie's and Bernard agrees. Susan introduces Bernard to Karl (Alan Fletcher) and Bernard later reveals that he likes her band. He shouts Karl a drink and they bond over the music. At the end of the night, Bernard surprises Susan by kissing her. A couple of days later, Bernard fills in for the teacher of a prenatal yoga class and he runs into Susan. She explains she is there to support a friend, but she later tries to tell him she is not interested in dating him. Bernard misunderstands, until Vanessa Villante (Alin Sumarwata) spells it out for him.

== Zoe Alexander ==
Zoe Alexander
- Neighbours character
- Portrayed by: Simmone Jade Mackinnon
- First appearance: 17 May 2012
- Last appearance: 8 August 2012
- Introduced by: Richard Jasek
In-universe information
- Occupation: PR consultant

Zoe Alexander, played by Simmone Jade Mackinnon, made her debut screen appearance on 17 May 2012. The character and casting was announced on 4 March 2012. Mackinnon initially had a three-week guest contract, which was later extended to three months. The actress relocated from the northern New South Wales coast to Melbourne for filming. Of her casting, Mackinnon told Luke Dennehy of the Herald Sun "I'm really excited to be here, everything has fallen into place and I was able to bring my two-year-old son (Madigan) with me." The part of Zoe was Mackinnon's first acting role in two years, as she took time off to raise her son. The actress stated that she was open to returning to Neighbours in the future. Mackinnon revealed her surprise at the working regime of Neighbours in an interview with David Knox of TV Tonight. She stated that the cast and crew work quickly to film 6 episodes a week and called the job the hardest gig she had ever done. She added "Oh my god. The first couple of weeks it was really hard. The first day there was a Bachelor Auction I was running and there was something like 35-40 pages of dialogue all done back to back –one scene after another. By the end of the day I had no idea what I was saying anymore!"

Zoe is a PR consultant, who is hired by Paul Robinson (Stefan Dennis) to improve his image within the community. Mackinnon revealed that Paul has a quite a bad profile, but if anybody can help then it is Zoe. The character was described as being "a super glamorous publicist" by a Channel 5 writer. They added "It might be a daunting task to make-over one of Ramsay Street's bad boys, but Simmone's character Zoe Alexander is one tough lady and up for the challenge." The writer also wondered if Paul had finally met his match in Zoe. Mackinnon said Zoe and Paul's relationship is initially worked based, but they eventually become love interests. Zoe bonds with Paul's young niece, Sophie (Kaiya Jones), who becomes attached to her because she needs a mother figure. Mackinnon believed Zoe "takes to it really well", despite having no children of her own. A writer for TV Week's online website said "PR consultant Zoe isn't one to mix business with pleasure, but that changes when the glamazon shares a quick (but oh-so-steamy) kiss with her boss, Paul Robinson." Sarah Morgan of the Daily Record noticed Zoe and Paul growing closer and commented "Somebody should warn her about him."

Zoe comes to 22 Ramsay Street to meet with Paul Robinson. She asks which of his businesses are in trouble, but Paul tells her that actually he is the client. He needs her to come up with a strategy to raise his public profile. Zoe states that is not her area, but Paul reveals that because of his negative reputation his businesses are suffering. He wants to become editor of his newspaper again and Zoe agrees to take on the job. She organises a bachelor auction at Charlie's to raise money for charity. Zoe anonymously puts in a high bid for Paul and she declares the night a success after they manage to raise $10,000. Paul tells Zoe that she owes him a date and he invites her to brunch. During their next meeting, Zoe gets to know Paul's son, Andrew (Jordan Patrick Smith), and his niece, Sophie. Just before she leaves, Zoe and Paul kiss. Zoe organises a photo spread in a magazine for the family and she gets Paul to fulfill a promise of donating money to the local high school. Priya Kapoor (Menik Gooneratne) collects the cheque, but when she insults Paul in front of the press, he rips it up. Zoe quits as his PR consultant, but later begins a relationship with him. Paul organises a meeting between Zoe and his editor, Susan Kennedy (Jackie Woodburne), hoping they will clash and she will agree to help him. However, Zoe sees through his plan. When she goes to see Susan, Zoe is offended when she takes a phone call during her apology. They argue and Zoe tells Paul that she will help him again. Zoe suggests to Paul that he offers to let his niece, Kate (Ashleigh Brewer), move in and she intervenes in a situation with Sophie. Paul then tells her to leave his family business to him. When Susan goes away for a course, Paul and Zoe come up with a plan to get him reinstated as editor. They meet with several clients, but the plan fails when Susan comes home early and finds out. Paul and Zoe attend a party together and Zoe is complimented by the neighbours. After they leave, Paul ends their relationship. Before she leaves, Zoe asks Paul to say goodbye to Sophie for her.

== Ed Lee ==
Ed Lee
- Neighbours character
- Portrayed by: Sebastian Gregory
- First appearance: 8 June 2012
- Last appearance: 1 October 2012
- Introduced by: Richard Jasek
In-universe information
- Occupation: University student

Ed Lee, played by Sebastian Gregory, made his first screen appearance on 8 June 2012. The character and casting was announced on 10 April 2012. Ed is Gregory's second role with Neighbours, he previously appeared as Garrett Burns in 2006. The actor has a four-month guest contract with the soap. Gregory's character is "a mathematical genius", who becomes a love interest of Natasha Williams (Valentina Novakovic). Ed introduces Natasha to a few of his unusual pastimes. A writer for Channel 5 revealed in March 2012, that Natashsa would be introduced to the hobby of LARPing, by a new guy who has "a surprising impact on her, taking her on an interesting adventure." Of Ed, Gregory said "He is very different but also likable, I'm really enjoying playing him."

Ed goes to Charlie's bar to work on some calculus. He tries to ask Natasha Williams for a new napkin to continue his work, but she assumes he is giving her his phone number. Ed explains what he is doing and Natasha gives it back to him. She tells him that she is also good at maths, but Ed states that what he is doing is different from anything she learned in school. Natasha later solves one of his equations and Ed apologises for underestimating her. He invites her to attend a maths club at the community centre. Ed notices Natasha has come along, but she leaves quickly. Ed returns to Charlie's to ask Natasha why she ran off and she states that she did not want to show him up in front of friends. Ed suggests that they have a contest at the bar and they play pool together. When Natasha compliments him, Ed becomes nervous and leaves. He later returns to collect his pen and Natasha tells him she has transferred to his university course. Ed helps Natasha learn conditional probability and they use it to predict the outcome of a game of cards in Charlie's. A group of men ask them to turn their experiment into a game of Blackjack, but they have to stop when some policemen enter the bar. Natasha then convinces Ed to hold another game at the Men's Shed, so she can make money and he can continue to test his theory. The experiment goes well, until Lucas Fitzgerald (Scott Major) shuts it down and orders Ed and Natasha to give all the money back. Natasha's friend, Andrew (Jordan Patrick Smith), comes up with an idea to use Ed's theory to make an odds calculator mobile app. Natasha goes to talk to Ed about the idea, but he gets her to join in with a live action role-play game instead. Natasha helps Ed's team to win the trophy and he later signs Andrew's contract for the mobile app.

Natasha attends a comic swap with Ed and when she accidentally takes a comic out of its plastic bag, the owner becomes angry and Ed purchases it for her. Andrew organises a press conference for the app, but Ed finds an error in the software. He and Natasha work together to fix it and while celebrating, they almost kiss. Ed asks Natasha if she wants to see a film with him, but she tells him she is studying. Ed later learns that Natasha and Andrew are giving an interview to a blogger and he accuses them of using him. Natasha apologises to Ed and insists that it was Andrew who wanted him to be left out. Ed asks that she and Andrew pay him a fee for his help with the app and they can go their separate ways. Ed embarrasses Natasha during a maths lecture, but she comes to him for advice when Andrew finds a buyer for the app. Ed learns that Natasha took his advice about not selling the app and they make up. Natasha then asks him out on a date. Natasha invites Ed to attend a gig with her and her friends to celebrate Andrew's birthday. During the drive, the group discover Sophie Ramsay (Kaiya Jones) in the boot of the car. Ed offers to get a taxi back home with her, but Andrew persuades Chris Pappas (James Mason) into letting her get in the car with them. When Natasha learns Andrew sold the app without her permission an argument breaks out, causing Chris to lose control of the car and crash. Ed fractures his collarbone and Natasha pulls him from the wreckage. When he wakes up in the hospital, Ed learns Natasha stayed with him through the night. She then says that she has something to tell him and they kiss. Ed and Natasha begin dating, but worry that they do not have much in common. Ed meets up with his best friend Toni (Darci Egan) and introduces her to Natasha, who becomes jealous of their friendship. Ed purchases a vintage suit for the university ball, but he is sad when coffee is spilt on it. Natasha finds him another suit to wear, which Ed realises was what she had planned for all along and they argue. After they both apologise, Natasha breaks up with Ed, telling him they are too different.

== Alex Delpy ==
Alex Delpy
- Neighbours character
- Portrayed by: Lachlan Woods
- First appearance: 1 August 2012
- Last appearance: 7 December 2012
- Introduced by: Richard Jasek
In-universe information
- Occupation: Doula

Alex Delpy, played by Lachlan Woods, made his first screen appearance on 1 August 2012. Alex is a male doula, who is chosen to help deliver her baby. A reporter for the Sunday Mercury called him "an attractive man". Dianne Butler, writing for the Herald Sun, stated "I'm also keen to see where things go with Alex, Sonya's doula, who's been put on to provide support in the lead-up and during her baby's arrival. And by baby I don't mean Toadie."

Alex is hired by Sonya Mitchell (Eve Morey) to support her throughout her pregnancy. He talks Sonya and her partner, Toadfish Rebecchi (Ryan Moloney), through his role in the birth. He suggests they might need a plan if anything goes wrong, which Sonya hopes they will not need. Alex gives Toadie some tips on massage for Sonya and he meets their son, Callum (Morgan Baker). Alex manages to win over Callum and he agrees to go for a drink with Toadie. While they are talking, Toadie asks Alex whether anything has happened between him and his clients. Alex assures him that he keeps his private and professional lives separate and Toadie assumes he is gay. When Sonya asks Alex how he managed to win Toadie round, he tells her that he let Toadie assume he was gay, so he would not be seen as a threat. When Sonya goes into labour, Alex comes over to stay with her and Toadie. Alex unsuccessfully tries helping Toadie to relax and stay calm. Toadie later tells Alex that he is not comfortable with Sonya staying at home any longer and Alex agrees to support him, but only if Sonya agrees. Sonya becomes angry at Alex taking Toadie's side and tells him that he was only hired because Toadie thought he was gay. When Sonya's water breaks, she becomes worried that there is meconium in the amniotic fluid and Alex states that she has to get to the hospital immediately. Toadie tells Alex to drive Callum to the hospital, while he goes with Sonya in the ambulance.

== Dale Madden ==
Dale Madden
- Neighbours character
- Portrayed by: David Reyne
- Appears on: 3 August 2012
- Introduced by: Richard Jasek
In-universe information
- Occupation: Businessman

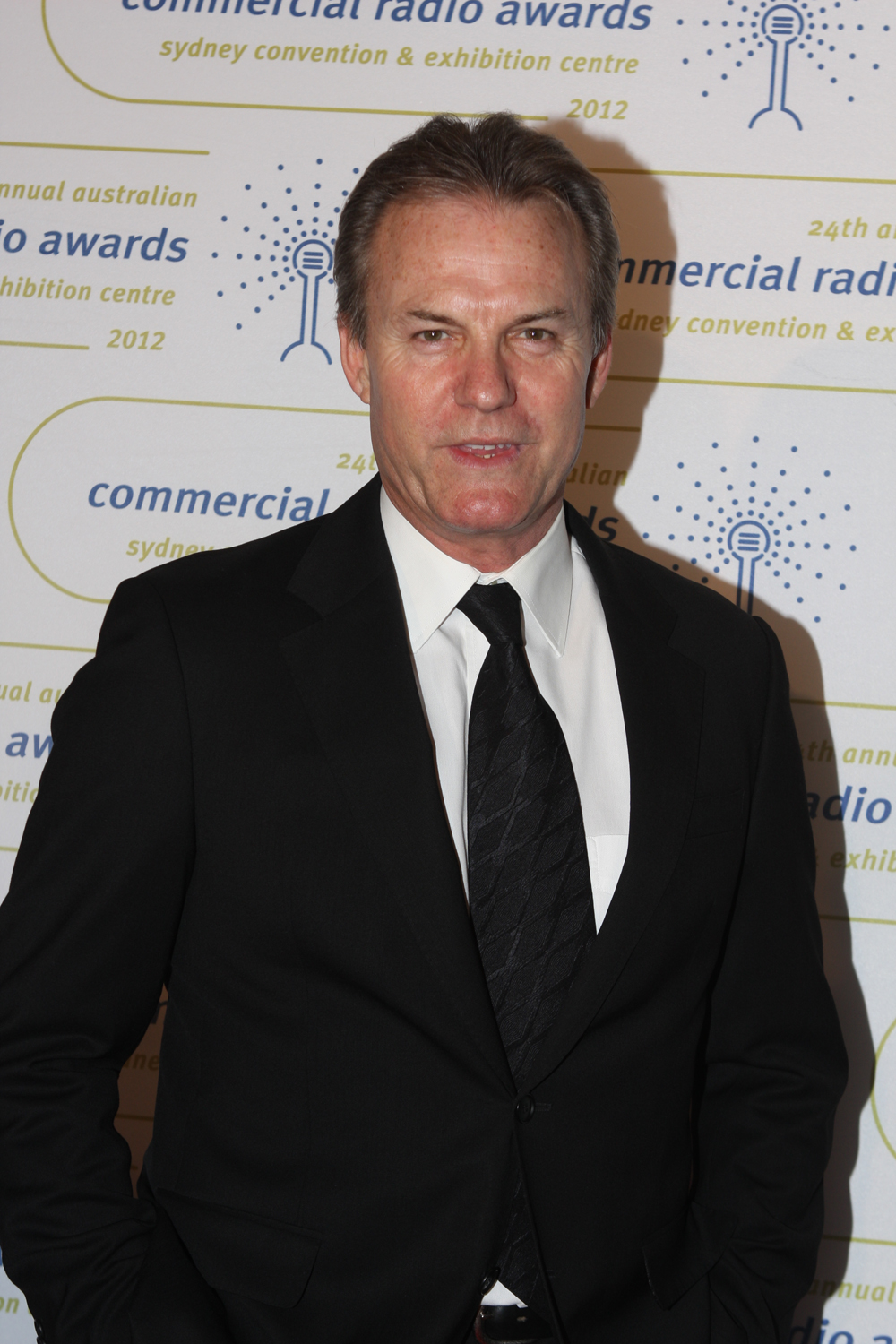
David Reyne played Dale Madden

Dale Madden, played by David Reyne, made his first screen appearance on 3 August 2012. Reyne's casting was announced on 13 May 2012 and he filmed his scenes the week before. Neighbours is Reyne's first television role since he appeared in The Flying Doctors in the early 1990s. Of his casting, the actor commented "I've always enjoyed acting and would love to do more of it. Neighbours is a nice foray back into it." Dale is "a shrewd businessman" who makes a deal with Andrew Robinson (Jordan Smith). Of Dale, television critic Dianne Butler commented "That guy from the casino Andrew's about to meet couldn't look more slippery."

Dale contacts Andrew Robinson with an offer for his Odds On mobile app. He later doubles the offer when Andrew refuses to sell. Andrew and Dale arrange a meeting at Lassiter's Hotel and Dale explains that in order to sell the app, Andrew needs the signature from his partner, Natasha Williams (Valentina Novakovic). Dale tells Andrew that he is flying to Sydney at six. Andrew manages to get the contracts signed and hands them over to Dale, who says the money will be sorted out soon.

== Harley Canning ==
Harley Canning
- Neighbours character
- Portrayed by: Justin Holborow
- First appearance: 3 September 2012
- Last appearance: 3 December 2012
- Introduced by: Richard Jasek
In-universe information
- Occupation: Student
- Father: Frank Canning Jr.
- Mother: Jackie Canning
- Brothers: Dane Canning
- Half-brothers: Levi Canning
- Grandfathers: Frank Canning
- Grandmothers: Sheila Canning
- First cousins: Kyle Canning

Harley Canning, played by Justin Holborow, made his first screen appearance on 3 September 2012. The character and casting was announced on 7 June 2012. Holborow joined Neighbours for a four-month guest stint and he began filming his first scenes in the same week as his casting announcement. Executive producer Richard Jasek commented "Justin is a star on the rise in Australia and we're delighted to have him join us. Harley is a charmer and a schemer, so it's going to be an interesting time on Ramsay Street."

A Channel 5 website writer explained that Harley's introduction would expand the established Canning family and stated that he shares the same good looks as his older cousin, Kyle (Chris Milligan). They commented "Lock up your daughters: there's a new Canning in town!" The writer added that Harley does not share the same moral compass as Kyle and he would break hearts. In July, Milligan revealed Harley has a habit of taking things without paying for them and that he fancies himself as a ladies' man. The Daily Star's Susan Hill called Harley "wayward" and reported that he turns up in Ramsay Street in a police car. Talking to Jackie Brygel of TV Week, Holborow said "He rides into the street in the back of a police truck and says, 'Hey, Dad!' to Kyle. He's been expelled from his high school in Frankston and he's trouble. He's a rebel without a cause." Kyle's friends think he might have had a secret son for a split second, but Kyle knows that Harley is his cousin. The situation forces Kyle to show how responsible he has become and take Harley in. He is then shocked when he learns that Harley has been in trouble with the law before and becomes determined to straighten him out. When asked if there was any romance ahead for his character, Holborow admitted that Harley begins a relationship with Rani Kapoor (Coco Cherian), who changes his life and makes him want to stay in Ramsay Street. Dianne Butler, writing for the Herald Sun, commented "It's hard when your name's Harley. There's the weight of expectation that you're tough, that you can handle yourself, that you'd steal 200 bucks out of your housemate's wallet without blinking. Kyle, at last, has twigged Harley's playing him like a fiddle, but there's not a lot he can do, because he's soft."

Harley is caught by Constable Hugo Border (Mike Smith) breaking into the train yard at Flinders Street station to do some tagging. The officer takes him to Kyle Canning's house in Erinsborough. When Harley gets out of the police car, he calls Kyle dad, in the hope that Hugo will leave him there. Kyle explains that they are actually cousins, but he will take responsibility for Harley to save Hugo driving all the way to Frankston. Kyle calls Harley's mother, who explains that he has been in trouble with the police three times. When Harley asks Kyle about going home, Kyle informs him that he is staying with him in Ramsay Street. Kyle gets Harley to help out at his handyman business and puts him in charge while he goes out. Harley meets Callum Jones (Morgan Baker) and Rani Kapoor, who he is attracted to. Kyle is impressed when he learns Harley took delivery of an order without any problems. Harley enrols at Erinsborough High and gives Kate Ramsay (Ashleigh Brewer) a hard time, after learning that she kissed a student. He later steals $200 from Rhys Lawson's (Ben Barber) wallet to buy a games console and Jade forces him to admit the truth to Kyle. After a night out at the movies, Harley and Rani kiss and begin dating. Rani's mother, Priya (Menik Gooneratne) catches Harley kissing Rani and asks him to stay away from her. Harley steals money from Sonya Mitchell's (Eve Morey) nursery, but when he learns Callum has been blamed, he gives it back. Kyle tells Harley to pack his bags, but he is persuaded to give him another chance. When Kyle learns that Harley has taken one of Jade's necklaces to give to Rani, he shouts at him and calls him stupid. He later apologises and states that stealing things is not going to get people to like him. Harley convinces Rani to ask her mother if they can hold an end-of-year dance. When he learns that they are having a bush dance in the Men's Shed, Harley tells Rani that he will organise a party in Frankston for them. Despite initially stating that she cannot go to Frankston, Rani changes her mind and she and Harley go to the bus stop to wait for his friends. However, Rani's father turns up and takes her home. Harley goes to Callum's and blames him for ruining his night. Callum points out that Harley does not care about Rani and tells him to leave. Harley's grandmother, Sheila (Colette Mann), then arrives to take him home to his mother.

== Bradley Fox ==
Bradley Fox
- Neighbours character
- Portrayed by: Aaron Jeffery
- First appearance: 18 September 2012
- Last appearance: 2 November 2012
- Introduced by: Richard Jasek
In-universe information
- Occupation: Journalist

Bradley Fox, played by Aaron Jeffery, made his first screen appearance on 18 September 2012. The character and casting was announced on 25 June 2012. Jeffery revealed that he "jumped at the chance" to work on Neighbours, after being invited to take on the part of Bradley. The actor was signed for two months and he relocated from Sydney to Melbourne, so he could film his scenes. Jeffery commented that he was trying to adapt to the change in weather, saying "First day on location I think it barely nudged six degrees, but at least I wasn't out in the open riding a horse all day. My character is more office bound, thank God."

Bradley takes on the job of deputy editor of the Erinsborough News. He is described as being "a hardened journalist", "tough" and someone "ready to make his own headlines." The Sydney Morning Herald's Frances Atkinson branded him "a rakish bloke", while Jeffery stated "I stole this description from Richard Jasek, the executive producer, who says, 'He's a cross between Peter Pan and Ernest Hemingway - he's a guy who still thinks he's 20 years old." Darren Devlyn from news.com.au revealed that Bradley is "not all he seems" and that he would make an instant impression. Jeffery explained "When Bradley comes in it's all roses, but there are a few things that happen that send things pear-shaped." Devlyn also revealed that Jeffery's character would embark on a controversial relationship with Summer Hoyland (Jordy Lucas).

Bradley is interviewed by Susan Kennedy (Jackie Woodburne) for the position of deputy editor of the Erinsborough News. Susan states that Bradley is over qualified for the job and he realises that is why she did not call him straight away. However, Susan offers him the job and Bradley accepts. On his first day, Bradley teams up with Summer Hoyland to interview Lucas Fitzgerald (Scott Major). They each write up the interview and Summer is impressed by Bradley's version. He then states that he will share the byline with her. Summer pitches an idea to Bradley and he asks another journalist to write it up. Summer then gets him into trouble with Susan for paraphrasing quotes, but later regrets her actions and apologises to Bradley. While researching an article on pole dancing, Bradley finds Susan taking part in a class at the community centre. She asks him to keep quiet and he agrees, telling her not to be embarrassed. Susan asks Bradley to be Summer's mentor at the paper and he agrees. Bradley and Summer go along to the trivia night at Charlie's, where they win first prize. As they are walking home, Summer kisses Bradley and he kisses her back. They later arrange a proper date, while Susan voices her concerns about the age difference between them. After another date, Summer takes Bradley to the newspaper office to have sex. However, they set the alarm off causing Susan to come down and sort it out. Bradley states that he was working on a story, while Summer hides under a desk. Susan later learns that Bradley lied in his references when she hired him. Susan calls Bradley into her office and she states that she knows why he left his last job. Bradley then admits that he was sacked for having an affair with his editor's daughter. Susan tells him that she is going to give him another chance, but he must not lie to her again. Bradley reveals that he has been looking for another job and has been offered one in Perth. Susan is unhappy with the development, but Summer decides to go with him. However, Bradley leaves for Perth without her and calls to say that he got an earlier flight. When Summer questions why he went without her, he tells her that he never said they were going to go together.

== Georgia Brooks ==
Georgia Brooks, played by Saskia Hampele, made her first screen appearance on 5 October 2012. The character and casting was announced on 1 August 2012. Hampele was in Kakadu when she was asked to record "an impromptu audition" for the Neighbours producers. She told Erin McWhirter of TV Week that after a few weeks of filming, she felt part of the Neighbours family. Georgia is the cousin of established character, Toadfish Rebecchi (Ryan Moloney). She is a graduate nurse and has been described as being "bubbly". Moloney revealed that Georgia would "stir things up" when she moves in with Toadie and his pregnant partner, Sonya (Eve Morey). He added that although it looks like Georgia is annoying Sonya, they then "get on like a house on fire". Peter Munro from The Sydney Morning Herald thought Georgia was "goofy".

== Francesca Villante ==
Francesca Villante
- Neighbours character
- Portrayed by: Carmelina di Guglielmo
- Duration: 2012–2013
- First appearance: 12 October 2012
- Last appearance: 11 January 2013
- Introduced by: Richard Jasek
In-universe information
- Husband: Tony Villante
- Daughters: Vanessa Villante
- Grandsons: Patrick Villante
- Granddaughters: Sebastiana

Francesca Villante, played by Carmelina di Guglielmo, made her first screen appearance on 12 October 2012. The character and di Guglielmo's casting was announced in the same month. Francesca is the "formidable" mother of Vanessa Villante (Alin Sumarwata). She comes to Ramsay Street to visit her daughter and is initially unaware she is pregnant, but the secret is revealed when she overhears a conversation between Vanessa and Chris Pappas (James Mason). Sumarwata stated that Vanessa had planned to turn up on her mother's doorstep after the baby was born, but now she has a lot of explaining to do. Francesca is "shocked" to learn her daughter is having a baby out of wedlock and is not in "a hospitable mood" when Lucas Fitzgerald (Scott Major) appears. She assumes Lucas is Vanessa's landlord and is unaware he is the father of her baby. Describing her character, di Guglielmo commented "She is very full-on, doesn't hold back with her opinions, and you can understand why Vanessa has run away to Ramsay Street." The actress, who has previously played other Italian mothers on-screen, added that Francesca is the "toughest mamma" she has played in a while.

Shortly after returning to Australia from Italy, Francesca comes to visit Vanessa. She notices she is tired and has put on weight, but puts it down to her baking. Vanessa introduces Lucas Fitzgerald as her landlord. Francesca tells her daughter that she wants to catch up with her and learn why she is now working in a coffee shop. Just as Francesca is leaving, she overhears Chris Pappas (James Mason) mention that Vanessa is pregnant. Francesca learns that Lucas is actually the baby's father and she insists on staying around, so she can learn more about him. Lucas tells Francesca how much he loves Vanessa and she reveals that she and her husband have accepted their relationship. Francesca then insists that they marry and finds a priest to conduct the wedding. When Vanessa bursts into tears during a dress fitting, Francesca believes that she is actually longing for a lavish wedding and vows to give her one. Francesca invites Father Guidotti (John Orcsik) to talk to Vanessa and Lucas about the wedding and their future together.

When she notices Vanessa's concern for Rhys Lawson (Ben Barber), Francesca demands to know what is going on. Vanessa tells her that she and Rhys dated, but she no longer has feelings for him. Francesca reveals that Vanessa's father, Tony, will not be attending the wedding and offers to walk her daughter down the aisle instead. During the wedding, Vanessa struggles with her vows and she leaves the church. Francesca follows her home and Vanessa reveals that she does not love Lucas and she got pregnant after a one-night stand. Francesca tells Vanessa that she has disgraced herself and is no longer a member of their family, before leaving. A few weeks later, Lucas contacts Francesca and eventually visits her to get her to change her mind, which she refuses to do. However, when she learns Vanessa is in labour, Francesca comes to the hospital to see her and her new grandson. A few days later, Francesca returns and tries to help Vanessa and Lucas come up with a name for their son. She is shocked when she learns Vanessa is back with Rhys and engaged. Francesca feels guilty and wonders if Vanessa is marrying Rhys because of her, but Vanessa reassures her she is not.

== Olivia Bell ==
Olivia Bell
- Neighbours character
- Portrayed by: Alyce Platt
- Duration: 2012, 2020–2021
- First appearance: 22 October 2012
- Last appearance: 31 March 2021
- Introduced by: Richard Jasek (2012); Jason Herbison (2020)
In-universe information
- Occupation: Writer

Olivia Bell, played by Alyce Platt, made her first screen appearance on 22 October 2012. The character and Platt's casting was announced on 9 August 2012. The actress previously appeared in Neighbours from 1995 to 1996 as medical student, Jen Handley. Platt explained that when she was asked to return to Neighbours sixteen years later, she did not need to think twice. She admitted, "It was a bit strange at first, coming back as a different character. But it was really amazing to see some of the same people. It was also the same green room – just a few new faces!" Olivia was introduced as a love interest for established character Karl Kennedy (Alan Fletcher). She is an "attractive, single woman" who meets Karl through a dating website. Platt said that both Olivia and Karl are looking to date again, but they get off to a rocky start due to their embellished dating profiles. Karl's profile makes him out to be "something a bit grander than what he actually is!" In a February 2020 interview for The Courier, Platt said she had returned to Neighbours. She stated, "I've gone back to Ramsay Street; I'm doing a little bit on Neighbours at the moment, which is wonderful. I'm enjoying it a lot, actually." Platt's management company confirmed that she would be returning as Olivia, and her return scenes aired on 6 May 2020. Platt reprised the role again for another guest stint in February 2021.

Olivia meets Karl Kennedy in local Erinsborough bar Charlie's for a date. They get on well and Olivia tells Karl about her job as a writer. Their date is interrupted by Natasha Williams (Valentina Novakovic), who explains that her mother is a huge fan of Karl and his music. Olivia is impressed and believes that kind of thing happens to Karl all the time. Olivia admits her profile was a little embellished and she actually published her books herself, selling only fifteen. Karl then admits that his profile was a little exaggerated too, calling Natasha over to explain how she wrote it for him. Olivia decides that they should start the date over. On their second date, Olivia comes to Karl's house for dinner. He reveals that he has cooked a seven course meal in the style of Heston Blumenthal, as he remembered Olivia liked him. Olivia finds the gesture too much and states that she is only just getting back into dating. She then tells Karl that there will not be a third date for them.

Eight years later, Olivia goes to The Waterhole and meets Karl. She tells him she has moved to Eden Hills and is still writing, while Karl reveals that he is back together with his wife. Olivia learns that his marriage is going through a rough patch and says that he can talk to her. They meet each other again the following day and Karl apologises for burdening Olivia with his problems, but she tells him that she loved catching up and is available if he needs to talk. Karl continues to spend time with Olivia talking about his marital problems and Finn Kelly (Rob Mills), who terrorised his family. Karl's wife Susan Kennedy (Jackie Woodburne) catches them together at Harold's Cafe and publicly confronts Karl. He later thanks Olivia for listening to him and tells her that they cannot see each other anymore, as he needs to lean on other people. Olivia hopes that he and Susan can work things out and Karl agrees that he needs to save his marriage. The Kennedys learn Olivia has written a book about Finn when she promotes it at the local Writers Festival. Karl realises Olivia used their conversations to gather more details on Finn and his crimes for her book.

Months later, Olivia returns to Erinsborough and tells Susan that she wants to write a revised version of her book from Susan's perspective. Susan and Bea Nilsson (Bonnie Anderson) later learn that Finn's mother is suing Olivia's publisher, which means that her book cannot be published overseas. Olivia says she wants to make up for the hurt she caused and allow Susan's truth to be told, but Susan warns her against contacting her or her family. Karl also reacts badly upon seeing Olivia and tells her she has wasted her time returning. Olivia later speaks with Finn's doctor David Tanaka (Takaya Honda). Olivia comes to the Kennedy's home to ask if Susan has thought about her proposal, but Karl tells Olivia that she is not welcome there. She ignores him and tells Susan that she will get full editorial approval, but Susan says that she has not made a decision and does not appreciate Olivia pressuring her. Olivia later tells Susan that she will write the book regardless of her input, and Susan eventually agrees to take part. However, after realising that it is taking a toll on her health, Susan tells Olivia that she can no longer contribute to the book. Olivia repeatedly calls Susan and later informs her that her publisher's advance was tied to Susan's involvement in the book. Olivia asks Ned Willis (Ben Hall) about a rent reduction on her space at The Hive, but Ned tells her that it is not possible. Noticing Bea nearby, Olivia comments that she needs Susan back, but Bea tells her that Susan has made her mind up. Karl sees them together and warns Olivia about harassing his family. Olivia claims her reputation is on the line, which incenses Karl, who tells her that he will not allow her to get away with causing his family more pain. Later that day, Olivia goes to the high school to see Susan. She is initially stopped by Hendrix Greyson (Ben Turland), but ignores him and goes inside, where she meets Karl. They argue on the landing and he demands that she stops torturing his family. He turns to leave and Olivia falls down the stairs. When she regains conscious at the hospital, Olivia accuses Karl of pushing her. Karl confronts her and begs her to tell the police the truth, but she accuses him of threatening her and he is asked to leave the hospital.

== Father Guidotti ==
Father Guidotti
- Neighbours character
- Portrayed by: John Orcsik
- Duration: 2012, 2016
- First appearance: 31 October 2012
- Last appearance: 21 July 2016
- Introduced by: Richard Jasek (2012); Jason Herbison (2016)
In-universe information
- Occupation: Catholic priest

Father Vincent Guidotti, played by John Orcsik, made his first screen appearance on 31 October 2012. The character and Orcsik's casting was announced on 24 October 2012. The actor previously appeared in Neighbours in 1999 to 2002 as Ron Kirk. Father Guidotti is a Catholic priest who presides over the wedding of Vanessa Villante (Alin Sumarwata) and Lucas Fitzgerald (Scott Major). Vanessa's mother, Francesca (Carmelina di Guglielmo), also asks Father Guidotti to talk to her daughter and Lucas ahead of the ceremony. Orcsik commented "He is a pretty liberal-minded priest, which is just as well considering what is about to transpire!"

Father Guidotti is invited by Francesca Villante to meet with her daughter, Vanessa and her fiancé Lucas Fitzgerald. He asks them questions about their future and whether they are ready to marry one another. Father Guidotti later states that while Lucas seems ready and has given his future a lot of thought, Vanessa seems less certain. She tries to reassure Father Guidotti that she is not, but he explains that she appeared to be giving him the answers that he wanted to hear. Father Guidotti reveals that he will give them his blessing, but only if they spend a little more time together discussing their relationship. Father Guidotti conducts the wedding, but has to prompt Vanessa to say her vows a few times. She then breaks down in tears and runs out of the church.

Four years later, Father Guidotti meets with Father Jack Callahan (Andrew Morley) at the Lassiter's complex. Jack thanks him for letting him move in, while Father Guidotti apologises for not being around when Jack was suffering from amnesia. Father Guidotti listens as Jack explains that he was questioning his faith before his accident and is still confused. Father Guidotti tells Jack that it is not weakness to question his faith and that he can always talk to him if he needs to. Days later, Jack tells Father Guidotti that he is having inappropriate thoughts about Paige Smith (Olympia Valance) and does not know if he can resist temptation. Father Guidotti goes to see Paige and tells her that Jack is going to keep his vows because he is a good man, who is not interested in girls like her. Jack confronts Father Guidotti, who apologises and explains that he is planning to retire, as he has a heart condition, and would like Jack to take over his church. Jack seeks further advice from Father Guidotti about his choice between his love for Paige and his faith. Father Guidotti tells Jack that Paige is not his path, as the church is his calling. He later apologises to Jack for being too harsh. Father Guidotti collapses while gardening and dies.

== Harry Vass ==
Harry Vass, played by Andy Clemmensen, appeared during the episode broadcast on 7 November 2012. The character and Clemmensen's casting was announced on 15 October 2012. The musician filmed his cameo while on a break from touring with his band Short Stack. Harry is a "talented singer" who hopes to win over the crowd during an open mic night. However, Harry faces fierce competition from Sophie Ramsay (Kaiya Jones).

Harry attends the open mic night at Charlie's bar in Erinsborough and performs an acoustic version of "Don't Look Back". At the end of the night, Natasha Williams (Valentina Novakovic) announces that Harry has won the competition.

== Monica Wetherby ==
Monica Wetherby, played by Pia Miller, appears on 19 November 2012. The character and Miller's casting was announced on 24 August 2012. Miller began filming her guest role during the same week. A Channel 5 website writer revealed the model was keen to "stretch her talents" and had completed several drama classes, as well as making small appearances in Australian dramas. Monica is a kindergarten teacher "who crosses paths" with Rhys Lawson (Ben Barber).

Monica is having drinks with a friend at Charlie's, when Rhys Lawson approaches her. They have a drink together and Monica is impressed that Rhys bought her favourite wine. She reveals that she is a kindergarten teacher and they talk about her students. Monica tells Rhys that she thinks he is cute, before going to get another drink for them both. Rhys then admits that while Monica is beautiful, he cannot do this anymore and she realises that he is trying to get over his ex-girlfriend.

== Scotty Boland ==
Scotty Boland
- Neighbours character
- Portrayed by: Rhys Uhlich
- Duration: 2012–2013
- First appearance: 7 December 2012
- Last appearance: 16 May 2013
- Introduced by: Richard Jasek
In-universe information
- Occupation: Farmer

Scotty Boland, played by Rhys Uhlich, made his first screen appearance on 7 December 2012. The character and Uhlich's casting was announced on 24 September 2012. The actor revealed that when he was invited to send in an audition tape for the show, he was shooting an ad campaign in northern Sumatra. He told The Daily Telegraph's Debbie Schipp, "I wasn't completely confident in my ability to act, so I decided if I featured a lot of the beautiful scenery if might detract from how bad I was. It seemed to work because when they called to talk about the part they said 'we would like to see you, but I have to say the place you filmed it was just beautiful'." Uhlich hoped that there would be a positive reaction to his performance, similar to the one his friend, Scott McGregor received when he appeared in the serial as Mark Brennan. Uhlich began filming his two-month guest stint during the same week as his casting announcement. His contract was later extended and his character will return to bring closure to his storyline on 16 May 2013.

Uhlich's character, Scotty, is a "country boy" and a farmer. He is the high school sweetheart of Georgia Brooks (Saskia Hampele). Scotty comes to Erinsborough and reveals a secret which will "rock the world of his beautiful girlfriend and have tongues wagging on Ramsay Street." Schipp later stated that Scotty would turn the street "upside down with a love triangle that will leave residents reeling". In February 2013, Daniel Kilkelly from Digital Spy reported that Chris Pappas (James Mason) would be shocked when he realises that Scotty "may have a romantic interest in him." During a charity camp-out, Scotty visits Chris' tent and says something that makes Chris believe he is making a move on him. Mason explained, "There is definitely a serious side to this storyline because everyone thinks this guy Scotty is straight, including his girlfriend. However, there are some funny moments as well, with Chris Milligan (Kyle Canning), leading up to the big revelation, which were great to play." Anthony D. Langford from AfterElton commented that Scotty was not an interesting character and he was glad that he was not going to be Chris' new boyfriend.

Scotty comes to Ramsay Street to visit his girlfriend of seven years, Georgia. He turns up at Number 26, just as Georgia is having a play fight with Kyle Canning. Scotty is surprised when Georgia mentions that her friend, Aidan Foster (Bobby Morley), is dating Chris Pappas (James Mason). Kyle and Scotty play table football and Scotty calls Kyle a cheat when he loses. A few days later, Scotty turns up at the hospital to surprise Georgia and ask her out to lunch. Georgia tells Scotty that she feels bad for Patrick Villante (Lucas MacFarlane), a newborn baby who has a heart condition, and his parents. However, Scotty states that she should be used to it and if not, she should choose a different profession. Georgia does not attend Scotty's mother's birthday party, but calls him to apologise. She later breaks up with him over the phone. Scotty comes to see Georgia and asks her to get back together with him. She later calls him and agrees to try again. Scotty helps Georgia out with a charity camp that she has organised. During the night, Scotty goes over to Chris' tent and asks him if he is warm enough. He later tells Chris that he had too many drinks and was not making advances on him. Scotty later invites himself over to Chris' house and makes further advances on him. When Chris tells him to stop, Scotty tries to kiss him. He then proposes to Georgia and she accepts. Scotty asks Georgia to elope with him, but before they can leave, Kyle reveals that Scotty made advances towards Chris. Scotty does not deny the accusations and he later leaves town, after writing an apology to Georgia. Weeks later, Kyle brings Scotty back to Ramsay Street to talk to Georgia. Scotty explains that he is sorry for messing her around and that it was not her fault. He then tells her that Kyle is a good guy, before leaving.

== Patrick Villante ==
Patrick Villante
- Neighbours character
- Portrayed by: Lucas MacFarlane; Caspar Bolton Leunig; Basquait Voevodin-Knack
- Duration: 2012–2013
- First appearance: 7 December 2012
- Last appearance: 24 September 2013
- Introduced by: Richard Jasek
In-universe information
- Father: Lucas Fitzgerald
- Mother: Vanessa Villante
- Sisters: Sebastiana
- Grandfathers: Patrick Fitzgerald; Tony Villante
- Grandmothers: Francesca Villante
- Uncles: Daniel Fitzgerald
- First cousins: Adam Fitzgerald

Patrick Maurizio Villante is Vanessa Villante (Alin Sumarwata) and Lucas Fitzgerald's (Scott Major) son. He was born on-screen during the episode broadcast on 7 December 2012. Patrick was initially played by Lucas MacFarlane and then Caspar Bolton Leunig. However, when the babies grew too big for the role, Basquait Voevodin-Knack took over. Of Voevodin-Knack, Sumarwata commented "I definitely feel like his pseudo mum and it's been lovely watching him develop. There are lots of smiles now, however he is a cheeky thing - he saves it for the break and not when we're rolling!" Executive producer Richard Jasek added that as Patrick was supposed to be ill when he was born, they needed to use smaller babies for the role. But now that he is better and starting to grow, Voevodin-Knack "is just perfect".

Vanessa was pregnant at the same time as Eve Morey's character Sonya Mitchell. Both characters were able "to play off each other" and share their experiences during their pregnancies. Sumarwata was required to wear a prosthetic baby bump while Vanessa was pregnant. Vanessa gives birth with Rhys Lawson (Ben Barber) by her side, leaving Lucas "heartbroken" for missing out on the moment. Vanessa and Lucas then struggle to name their son. Barber later revealed that Rhys would discover that something is wrong with Patrick and he has to be the one to tell Vanessa and Lucas. Sumarwata stated "Everything had seemed fine up until then, but this is absolutely her worst nightmare. Vanessa and Lucas's whole lives look set to be turned upside down."

Vanessa becomes pregnant following a one-night stand with Lucas. She returns a few weeks later to inform him of the news and he initially does not accept his responsibilities towards her and the baby. Vanessa briefly suffers severe morning sickness and Lucas later decides to become more involved with his baby. Vanessa reaches her due date, but the baby does not come. Four weeks later, Vanessa goes into labour with Rhys Lawson (Ben Barber) at her side and she gives birth to a son. Lucas later arrives at the hospital and meets his son for the first time. Lucas and Vanessa struggle to agree on a name for their son, as Lucas does not want a name that can be made fun of. They later agree to name him Patrick. During a routine check-up, Georgia Brooks (Saskia Hampele) finds Patrick has an irregular heartbeat and blue fingertips. Rhys takes him for further tests and discovers he has Ebstein's anomaly. Patrick has to remain in the hospital and Lucas and Vanessa are told that he will need surgery to fix the hole in his heart. However, Patrick's oxygen levels soon drop and he is rushed into surgery. The operation is successful, but Rhys states that he will need more surgery in the future. Lucas and Vanessa have Patrick baptised, before he goes into surgery to repair the valve in his heart. The operation is successful and Lucas and Vanessa bring Patrick home the following week. A few weeks later, Patrick is kidnapped by Stephanie Scully (Carla Bonner), who believes he is her son. However, Patrick is soon returned to his parents unharmed. Lucas, Vanessa and Patrick later move to Daylesford.

== Others ==
Date(s)	Character	Actor	Circumstances
9 January	Josh Gould	Jack Matthews	A patron of Charlie's, who takes a liking to Kate Ramsay. Josh goes over to Kate's table to chat. He sends Kate a text the next day telling her how much he enjoyed the night.
11 January–11 September 2012, 26 August 2014–15 August 2019, 5 August 2021	Sandra Kriptic	Kim Hateley/King	A nurse at Erinsborough Hospital. Rhys Lawson takes his anger out on her when he fails to get into the hospital's surgical program, reducing her to tears. Sandra later tells her colleague Aidan Foster that Andrew Robinson has failed to turn up for a sleep clinic. A couple of years later, Karl Kennedy praises Sandra for her efforts in helping Georgia Brooks, when she is rushed back into surgery, after her incision reopens. Sandra hesitates when Karl questions her about Georgia's first operation under Jessica Girdwood, causing him to suspect something went wrong. Sandra visits Harold's Store and allows her daughter, Lorna Kriptic, to receive a free hug from Daniel Robinson. The following year, Karl asks Sandra to book a CT scan and carry out various tests on Toadfish Rebecchi, who is brought in with head and spinal injuries. Paige Smith comes to check on John Doe, after he is admitted with a head injury, and Sandra explains that the medical staff do not know his identity. Sandra checks on John when Paige realises Nene Williams is treating him. Months later, Sandra asks Karl to see a terminally ill patient. The following year, Sandra asks David Tanaka if they can swap places on a course, so she can avoid her former boyfriend Rob Carson, who did not take their break up well. Sandra is present when Finn Kelly wakes from his coma, and she alerts David, who asks her to monitor Finn. Sandra later tells Bea Nilsson that Finn is now aware that it is 2019, but asks her not to talk about events from the past 12 years, as he is psychologically fragile. Months later, Sheila Canning asks Sandra if Clive Gibbons is free, but Sandra tells her that he is in a meeting. Sheila takes the microphone for the PA system and addresses Clive, while warning Sandra off each time she comes near. Two years later, Sandra watches over David looking through Nicolette Stone's patient files and David lies to her to cover his tracks.
12 January–18 September	Robbie O'Brien	Shaun Goss	Robbie is a surgical intern at Erinsborough Hospital, who is befriended by Rhys Lawson. When Rhys learns Robbie is not happy, he suggests that he should quit the surgical program. Robbie reads a newspaper article about Rhys saving a patient's life and he admits that he came close to leaving, but realised that he wants to be a surgeon. Months later, Robbie and Rhys assist Jessica Girdwood in surgery, but Rhys lets Robbie do the work. Robbie is puzzled when Rhys takes his name off the rota for the next surgery and when Vanessa Villante asks for Rhys, Robbie tells her what happened.
18–25 January 2013	Charlotte McKemmie	Meredith Penman	Charlotte takes over from Peter Noonan's at Simmons & Colbert law firm. She tells Toadfish Rebecchi that the board have decided to let him go, but when he threatens to sue, he is reinstated. Charlotte, Toadie and his partner, Sonya, go out to celebrate. Charlotte is furious when an app flashes up on Toadie's screen during an important meeting and she catches Toadie and Sonya about to have sex in the office. Charlotte forces Toadie to do some extra work. Toadie injures his back and conducts a meeting standing up, which the clients like. Charlotte is impressed and amused when she finds out why Toadie could not sit down. Toadie confides in Charlotte about his fertility problems and asks for extra work. Sonya asks Charlotte to go easy on Toadie, but Charlotte tells her that he asked for the work. She later turns down his request for overtime. Charlotte organises a franchise deal for Jade Mitchell's singles boot camp idea. When Charlotte thinks about putting Toadie up for a promotion, her behaviour causes him and Sonya to think that she has feelings for him. Charlotte changes her mind about the promotion, until Sonya apologises. Charlotte interviews Ajay Kapoor and gives him her old job. Ajay walks out of a divorce meeting due to his own marital problems and later shocks Charlotte by quitting his job. Toadie convinces Charlotte to ask the firm to donate money to a fund set up for Patrick Villante.
26 January–11 July	Vaughn Redden	Kain O'Keeffe	Vaughn is a barman at Charlie's, who tends to Aidan Foster after he is hit in the eye with a pool cue. Vaughn flirts with Aidan, who reciprocates and they later go on a date. Chris Pappas later points Vaughn out to Summer Hoyland and tells her that he asked him how Aidan was. Vaughn comes over to Chris and asks him if he can get him anything, but Chris leaves.
3 February	Buddy Telford	Lloyd Bissell	Buddy is a hard rubbish collector, who picks up some items from Ramsay Street. He is stopped by Karl and Susan Kennedy, who ask him if he has picked up an esky and can they have it back as it contains their dead dog. Karl gives Buddy some money and Buddy allows him to climb into the back of his truck to fetch the esky.
6 February	Ken McBride	Matt Trevett-Lyall	Ken is policeman from Port Douglas. He stops Dominic Emmerson and fines him for riding his bike and being on the phone. He also tells Dominic to do his helmet up.
6–7 February	Luke Malicki	Nathan Strauss	Luke is a barman, working in a backpackers bar in Port Douglas. He serves Kate Ramsay and flirts with her friend, Erin (Elise Jansen), who he later has sex with. Luke decides to join Erin and Kate on the next part of their holiday to Asia. Erin asks Kate if they can put the trip on hold as Luke needs a couple more weeks to raise the money.
7 February	Teddy Miller	Chris Millington	Teddy goes to a backpackers bar and catches the eye of Kate Ramsay. She comes over and asks him if he knows Dominic Emmerson and if he has his number. Teddy tells her does not, but he calls the office to find out where Dominic is for her.
13–16 February	Bryce Unwin	Greg Stone	Bryce is a Port Douglas police seagant. He talks to Paul Robinson, who is looking for his niece, Kate Ramsay, and explains there is not much the police can do if she does not want to be found. When Paul reveals he has accessed Kate's bank account, Bryce tells him the police will be looking into him and they will put Kate's interests first. Paul later returns and tells Bryce his wallet has been stolen. Bryce orders Paul to leave Port Douglas after he tries to steal a boat. He also gives Paul his wallet back, explaining that it was on the floor in the station and a local person handed it in.
13 February	Arnie Fleming	Jack Naylor-Hampson	Arnie overhears Paul Robinson asking about his niece, Kate Ramsay, and he tells him he has some information about her. Paul buys him lunch, but the information he receives from Arnie is not helpful. Paul gets fed up and returns Arnie's meal to a barman, before telling him to disappear before he calls the police.
14 February	Bianca Dawson	Stephanie Nicole Mauro	Bianca attends a traffic light party at Eden Hills and flirts with Andrew Robinson. Bianca reveals she likes Red Cotton and Andrew tells her he manages the band. Bianca offers to give Andrew her number, but he walks away.
16 February	Security Guard	John Krasicki	Krasicki plays a security guard who stops Paul Robinson from stealing a boat.
22 February 2012–6 June 2017	Margie Chan	Kathy Vongsanga	Margie is a waitress at Harold's Store. In 2017, Margie accidentally cuts her finger off while working in the kitchen. Xanthe Canning helps keep her calm and bandages the wound. The finger is reattached at the hospital. Vongsanga was first credited on 24 April 2014, but appeared as an extra beforehand. She continued to make numerous background appearances until 2017.
27 February	Owen Shaw	Chris Gibson	While sitting in the Eden university courtyard, Owen is joined by Natasha Williams and Andrew Robinson. They assume he is a business student, but Owen reveals he is the lecturer. Owen later tells Andrew that he has some friends in the entertainment industry and maybe he can sort something out for him.
27 February	Axel Cooper	James Campbell	Axel is a student at Erinsborough High. When he learns Summer Hoyland cheated on her exam and is repeating, he makes fun of her.
1–30 March	Claudia Howard	Madison Daniel	Claudia comes to greet Sophie Ramsay on her first day at Eden Hills Grammar. At soccer practice, Claudia ignores Sophie and does not pass to her. During their next game, Claudia does not pick Sophie for her team, but when Sophie scores, she compliments her.
2 March	Wendy Anderson	Sharon Fenech	Wendy is an insurance assessor who comes to visit Lou Carpenter and talk about compensation for a neck injury he sustained while on a cruise. Wendy is satisfied with Lou's claim, until Toadfish Rebecchi accidentally reveals Lou has been out and about. Wendy throws a ball at Lou and he catches it, proving his injury is fake.
5 March	Bonnie Elder	Hannah Daniel	Bonnie is a new barmaid at Charlie's, who Rhys Lawson flirts with. After some banter, Bonnie gives Rhys her number.
6 March–9 April	Belinda Ferry	Rachel Jessica Tan	Tan previously appeared in Neighbours in 2010 as Jade McKenzie. Belinda meets Summer Hoyland at the Journalism course stand at Eden Hills University. Belinda reveals that she is only doing the course so she can get into Television Journalism. She adds that she wants to make contacts quickly to fast track her career. Belinda later turns up at Natasha Williams' party and flirts with Andrew Robinson. She later finds him alone in a bedroom and they kiss, before they are interrupted by Summer. Andrew tells Belinda that he and Summer were on a break and she tries to kiss him again. Andrew pushes her away and leaves the room.
14 March–9 May	Celeste McIntyre	Cassandra Magrath	Celeste is the manager of Charlie's. She agrees that Andrew Robinson's band Red Cotton can have a monthlong residency at the bar. Celeste later questions Andrew about his promotion of the gig as ticket sales have been slow. Andrew tries to reassure Celeste that he is doing all he can to make the gig a success and Celeste reports that ticket sales are doing well thanks to a newspaper piece on the band. Celeste interviews Kate Ramsay and Natasha Williams for a job at the bar and she gives them both a two-week trial. At the end of the two weeks, Celeste gives Natasha the waitressing job. She later makes Kate manager due to her bookkeeping skills and the fact she has to run a couple of other bars in the area.
22 March	Valerie Edwards	Grace Knight	Knight's casting was announced on 28 November 2011. Valerie's husband, Jimmy, dies and she sings a duet with Karl Kennedy at the funeral service.
28 March	Chloe Guildford	Alisha Stanza	Chloe attends Jade Mitchell's singles boot camp. She enquirers after Kyle Canning's whereabouts and tells Jade she is lucky to have him. Chloe then flirts with Rhys Lawson.
2 April 2012–2 May 2016, 3 July 2025	Glen Darby	Luke Jacka	Glen is a receptionist at Lassiter's Hotel. Having received a call from Paul Robinson, Glen informs his son, Andrew, that he is no longer required to work at the hotel. Glen is one of many customers who frequent Harold's Store to buy Vanessa Villante's cupcakes. Paul places Glen in charge when he has a VIP guest arriving at the hotel and tells Glen to treat his guest well. The following year, Glen gets caught between Paul and new manager, Terese Willis, and Paul snaps at Glen to move a leaflet display. While taking part in the local fun run, Glen spots a collapsed Josie Lamb and is asked by Matt Turner to get an ambulance. The next year, while on reception, Terese Willis asks Glen for a guest's details after seeing him with Paul. In 2015, Georgia Brooks asks Glen for a key card to Nick Petrides's room, claiming that she is his girlfriend. Glen initially refuses, but relents when Georgia tells him she knows Terese and can make things difficult for him. Glen later helps out with a charity sausage sizzle. Paul pretends to interview Glen for a potential job at Robinsons Motel, but he really wants to know about the day of the Lassiter's explosion. Nine years later, Glen, now the Lassiter's acting manager, gives Nicolette Stone a free voucher as compensation for a Lassiter's Day Spa product giving her a rash.
4 April	Lottie Woods	Cleonie Morgan	Lottie is a nurse at Rowanoaks care home. She arranges for Elaine Lawson to visit her son, Rhys at his house. But Rhys tells her he is working over Easter and must cancel the visit. Lottie later takes a delivery of flowers from Jade Mitchell and Kyle Canning, when she notices how nice the flowers from Sonya'a Nursery are. When Elaine becomes upset with Rhys, Lottie takes her back to her room.
9–12 April	Bruce Bently	Gabriel Partington	Bruce and his friends are told to leave Charlie's bar because it is closing. Paul Robinson tells Bruce that there is a house party in Ramsay Street and he and his friends make their way there. At the party, Bruce bumps into Andrew Robinson and they almost start a fight. He then takes a surfboard off the wall and jumps on it. After he is ordered to leave, he picks up a coat and take some car keys. Bruce returns to Charlie's a couple of days later and Summer Hoyland recognises him, she asks how he knew about the party and he tells her about Paul.
16 April	Nadia Wiseman	Amy Costa	While at Charlie's with some friends, Nadia meets Lucas Fitzgerald and they flirt with each other. Nadia decides to return to Lucas's place, but when they are interrupted by Lou Carpenter and Vanessa Villante, she leaves.
19 April	Jonty Douglas	Jace Chan	Jonty and Morris reply to Karl Kennedy's flyer asking for band members. Jonty leaves when he realises Karl is older than he thought. Morris tells Karl that he used to play oboe in the orchestra and is a little deaf.
19 April	Morris Olsen	Colin Macpherson	Jonty and Morris reply to Karl Kennedy's flyer asking for band members. Jonty leaves when he realises Karl is older than he thought. Morris tells Karl that he used to play oboe in the orchestra and is a little deaf.
20–23 April	Astrid Quinn	Michelle O'Grady	Astrid comes to Sonya's Nursery and asks Sonya Mitchell to look after Clancy, an orphaned, female wombat. When Astrid comes to collect Clancy, she asks Sonya and her partner, Toadfish Rebecchi if they want to look after anymore Wombats. She then invites them down to her animal rescue shelter for a look around.
20–23 April	Clancy	Uncredited	Clancy is an orphaned, female wombat who Astrid Quinn asks Sonya Mitchell to look after for a while. Sonya and her partner, Toadfish Rebecchi, care for Clancy until Astrid takes her back. A writer for Channel 5 announced Clancy's arrival on 30 January 2012. Of Clancy, Cameron Adams writing for the Herald Sun said "And could Ramsay St have a new iconic pet to rival Bouncer, with the introduction of Clancy the wombat?"
26 April – 30 January 2015	Howard Hall	John Henderson	Howard welcomes the new creative freedom given to the Erinsborough News staff by new editor Susan Kennedy. Months later, Howard befriends deputy editor Bradley Fox when Bradley gives him a story about a Paralympian, knowing Howard has written about disability in sports before. The following year, Howard becomes the editor of the West Watarah Star and meets with Brad Willis to discuss a sponsorship deal for his son, Josh. In 2015, Howard interviews Lou Carpenter about the forthcoming E.M. Williams novel. Their interview is interrupted by Sheila Canning and Paul Robinson, who threatens to sue Lou if the novel is published. He also warns Howard not to mention his presence in the paper.
26 April	Fiona Meldrum	Meredith Chipperton	Fiona works for the Erinsborough News and agrees to spy on Susan Kennedy for the owner, Paul Robinson. Fiona tells Paul about Susan's new approach to pitching story ideas. Susan later learns what Fiona has been doing and she confronts her. Fiona states that Paul was going to fire her, but Susan reveals that he does not have the power to do that anymore. She then fires Fiona for her deception.
4–10 May	Vera Munro	Marie-Therese Byrne	Vera attends a mature dance class at the Erinsborough Community Centre, where she meets Lou Carpenter. He takes her out for coffee and Vera asks him to accompany her to a wedding. When Lou mentions that his best shoes are not in good condition, Vera offers to buy him a new pair. Vera meets Lou at the Lassiter's Complex and he mentions that he lost his wallet at the wedding. Vera then replaces his lost rent money. Vera hands over the money to Lou and they go dancing, but Sheila Canning interrupts them and reveals Lou still has his wallet. Vera realises Lou has lied to her and after he gives her money back, she leaves.
8 May	Mason Reeves	Carter Doyle	While he is at Charlie's, Mason overhears a conversation between Natasha Williams and Jade Mitchell. He offers to buy Natasha a coffee and then reveals that he knows her, having seen pictures of her on the internet. Natasha leaves, but she later runs into Mason again. She tells him to leave her alone, when he asks if she has changed her mind.
16 May 2012, 24 February–28 March 2014, 13 October–6 November 2014	Patricia Pappas	Katerina Kotsonis	Patricia is the mother of Chris Pappas. She is introduced to Lucas Fitzgerald by her husband, George, and she gives him some advice on babies. Patricia and George throw a birthday party for Chris at Lassiter's Lake. George tells Patricia that Chris is in a relationship and she encourages him to support Chris and let him leave the party. Two year later, Patricia attends a gamblers anonymous meeting chaired by Sonya Mitchell. She tells Sonya that her family does not know about her problem. Patricia learns that Chris' boyfriend is in jail and he has been lying to her. With her husband away, Patricia feels isolated and she gambles. She also steals a watch to fund her addiction, leading to her arrest. Chris then learns the truth and Patricia asks him to keep it from George. When George returns from Greece he disowns Patricia, but Chris persuades him to be with his wife at her court hearing. Patricia receives a twelve-month good behaviour bond and no conviction. After Chris is attacked and left with brain damage, Patricia returns to help out with his recovery. She meets his new boyfriend Nate Kinski, who tells her he can cope with Chris's injuries. Patricia takes her anger out on Sonya when she learns her husband is representing Chris' attacker Josh Willis. Patricia later became the prime suspect when someone sent Sonya's friends and family poison pen letters.
16 May	Koula Pappas	Louise Theodosopoulos	Koula is Chris Pappas' grandmother. She attends a birthday party for him at Lassiter's Lake.
5–6 June	Dawn Ballantyne	Marita Wilcox	Dawn pays for Lou Carpenter's company, believing him to be an English gentleman. Dawn later comes to Ramsay Street to visit Lou and they attend a street party together. Dawn then asks Lou to accompany her to England for a few months. Lou tries to get out of the trip, so Dawn will not learn he is Australian. However, Dawn confesses that she knows he is not English and insists that Lou still accompanies her to England.
11 June–10 July	Keith Wright	Ross Thompson	Keith and his wife, Pam, meet with Kyle Canning to discuss a potential contract between their businesses. Keith assumes Kate Ramsay is Kyle's partner, which pleases him as he likes family run businesses. The group go out to lunch and Keith gives the contract to Kyle. Keith later returns to talk to Kyle and notices Kate is working at a bar. Kyle tells him that she works a few shifts to raise extra money. Keith returns the following day and he witnesses an argument between Kyle and Jade Mitchell. Keith then learns Kate is not Kyle's girlfriend and leaves.
11 June	Pam Wright	Patricia Pitney	Pam accompanies her husband, Keith, to Erinsborough to meet with Kyle Canning. Pam and Keith take Kyle and Kate Ramsay out to lunch and they discuss their businesses and relationships.
25 June 2012, 25 February 2019	Tim Park	David Cormick	A paramedic, who is called to treat Troy Miller. Toadfish Rebecchi shows him into Number 32, but Troy is nowhere to be seen. Seven years later, Tim treats Bea Nilsson for smoke inhalation after a fire at Fitzgerald Motors.
13–14 June	Tiffany Giles	Shaye Hopkins	Tiffany attends a cooking class at the local community centre. She is not happy to learn the usual teacher is sick and Vanessa Villante is taking the class. Tiffany flirts with Rhys Lawson and they go to Harold's Store for coffee. Tiffany invites Rhys to dinner, but Vanessa interrupts them to ask Rhys about their date that night.
15 June	Hayley Coulter	Elizabeth Friels	Hayley meets Lucas Fitzgerald and goes back to his house, where she meets Rhys Lawson and Vanessa Villante. Lucas asks Rhys and Vanessa to leave, but they refuse, so the four of them sit down to dessert and share an awkward conversation. Hayley then decides to leave.
20 June	Cameron Drake	Nic Romney	Cameron and his colleague Rhys Lawson go to Harold's Store during their break. They are discussing ways to keep their patients occupied during treatments, when Karl Kennedy suggests they show them viral videos from the Erinsborough News website.
21 June	Sara Stone	Susan Paterno	Vanessa Villante introduces Sara to Lucas Fitzgerald and they get on well. Lucas takes Sara back to his house and Vanessa tells her that they are brother and sister. Chris Pappas comes over to speak to Lucas and accidentally reveals Vanessa is carrying Lucas's child. Sara then leaves.
26 June–22 August	Archie Silver	Jonathon Mahon	Constable Archie Silver is called to Ramsay Street after Troy Miller holds Sonya and Jade Mitchell hostage in his house. He reminds Toadie Rebecchi about his restraining order and tells him to leave. Silver later questions Jade about Troy's head injury. A couple of months later, Silver questions Chris Pappas about a car crash he was involved in and then asks him to hand his license over.
13 July	Phillip Reeve	Darren Mort	Phillip works for The Salvation Army and he comes to inspect Number 24 and speak to Kate and Sophie Ramsay. Phillip learns that Sophie is no longer living in the house and that two other people are. After speaking to his supervisors, he explains that the Salvo's are going to sell the house.
25–26 July	Matt Plath	James Monarski	Matt is a blogger who attends the press gathering for the Odds On mobile app created by Andrew Robinson, Ed Lee and Natasha Williams. He later sits down with Andrew and Natasha for an interview about how they created the app. Andrew tries to avoid mentioning Ed, while Natasha later asks Matt to include his name in the article.
3–6 August	Heath Pryce	Tom Hobbs	Heath is one of Jade Mitchell's clients. He attends a party for her and later asks her out on a date. Jade initially turns him down, but changes her mind and they have a coffee.
3 September	Hugo Border	Mike Smith	Constable Hugo Border catches Harley Canning breaking into the train yard at Flinders Street to do some tagging. The officer brings Harley to Ramsay Street and asks for a Kyle Canning. Harley tries to explain that he is into train spotting, but Hugo does not believe him. Kyle agrees to take responsibility for Harley and Hugo leaves.
4 September	Toni Scott	Darci Egan	Toni is Ed Lee's best friend. They arrange to meet at Charlie's and Ed invites his girlfriend, Natasha Williams, along. Natasha becomes jealous of Toni's friendship and history with Ed and she makes her feel uncomfortable.
7 September	Serge Pavlov	Peter Kalos	Serge is the owner of Charlie's until he agrees to sell the bar to Paul and Andrew Robinson.
12 September	Don Hennessy	Jeremy Kewley	Don is Chris Pappas' lawyer for his upcoming case against Paul Robinson. Lucas Fitzgerald questions him about the case and realises that he is not up to the job.
15 September 2012, 20 August 2013, 30 July 2015	Trev Barnett	Dan Quigley	After buying into Kyle Canning's handyman business, Jade Mitchell realises that he is being overcharged for timber by Trev. She convinces Trev to give them a discount after threatening to take their business elsewhere. The following year, Trev delivers some timber to the yard and Lou Carpenter helps him carry it, until he hurts his back. Trev attends an underground poker game organised by Robbo Slade. A couple of years later, Trev drives the local recycling truck and is stopped by Kyle and Amy Williams, who ask if they can look in the back for a lost teddy bear. However, Trev refuses to let them look, despite Amy's attempt at emotional blackmail.
19 September–22 November	Evie Sullivan	Lucia Smyrk	Evie runs pole dancing classes at the community centre. Susan Kennedy signs up for a session initially believing it to be a regular dance class. Evie compliments Susan on learning the routine quickly and is pleased when Susan agrees to return. Evie later welcomes Susan's sister, Carmel, to a session.
16 October 2012–13 June 2013, 9 May 2018	Caroline Perkins	Alinta Chidzey	Caroline is a receptionist at Lassiter's Hotel. She is propositioned by Paul Robinson and quickly agrees to go to the penthouse suite with him. However, Paul is disappointed at her reaction, as he prefers the chase and tells Caroline to forget about it. The following year, Caroline tells colleague Mason Turner how she has been fielding calls from Mark Brennan's girlfriend all day, leading Mason to confront Mark. Caroline clashes with new hotel manager Terese Willis and is bribed by Paul into giving a statement at Mason's trial. Caroline later complains to Paul about Terese and he tells her he will do something about it. However, Terese fires Caroline and she decides to sue Paul for sexual harassment. Caroline is worried about losing the case and tries to ask Paul for a settlement. In an effort to reduce her legal fees, Caroline comes on to Ajay Kapoor, but he rejects her advances. Terese arranges a settlement for Caroline and she apologises to her. A few years later, Caroline returns to Lassiters to run a compliance training course for the staff. She praises Dipi Rebecchi for her approach to customer service and tells Sheila Canning she has failed the course.
5 November	Barbara Hampstead	Kath Gordon	Barbara is a hypochondriac, who goes on a date with Karl Kennedy.
29 November	Nick Mulane	Adam Gray	Nick is a bar critic who comes to review Charlie's. He starts flirting with Natasha Williams and when he runs his hand up her leg, she tells him to back off. Andrew then throws Nick out of the bar.
29 November	Freya Marshall	Erica Jan	Freya is a cleaner at Lassiter's Hotel who becomes Sophie Ramsay's supervisor on her first day. Freya later shows Sophie the lost property and tells her she can take anything she wants after it has been there for a month.
6 December	Karen May	Holly Meegan	Karen is in Harold's Store when Vanessa Villante goes into labour. She and Natasha Williams try to help her and Karen offers to take her to the hospital.
7 December	Caroline Rosen	Amanda Logan	Caroline is a midwife at Erinsborough Hospital, who helps deliver Vanessa Villante's son.
