= Karl Kennedy =

Fictional character from Neighbours

- Neighbours character
- Portrayed by: Alan Fletcher
- Duration: 1994–2025
- First appearance: 20 September 1994
- Last appearance: 11 December 2025
- Introduced by: Stanley Walsh
- Spin-off appearances: Neighbours vs Zombies (2014); Summer Stories (2016); Neighbours vs Time Travel (2017)
In-universe information
- Other names: E. M. Williams (pen name)
- Occupation: Doctor; Handyman; Pharmaceutical sales rep; Barman
- Family: Kennedy
- Father: Ronald Davies-Smythe
- Mother: Molly Kennedy
- Adoptive father: Tom Kennedy
- Half-sisters: Jemima Davies-Smythe
- Wife: Susan Kennedy (1978–2004, 2007–present)
- Sons: Malcolm Kennedy; Billy Kennedy
- Daughters: Libby Kennedy; Holly Hoyland
- Stepsons: Zeke Kinski
- Stepdaughters: Katya Kinski; Rachel Kinski
- Grandsons: Jackson Kennedy; Ben Kirk
- Granddaughters: Susannah Kennedy
- Grandfathers: Peter Davies
- Grandmothers: Elizabeth Smythe
- Nieces: Trudy Callhoun
- Other relatives: Jasper Callhoun

Karl Kennedy is a fictional character from the Australian soap opera Neighbours, played by Alan Fletcher. The actor previously appeared in the soap in 1987 as mechanic Greg Cooper. He made his first screen appearance as Karl during the episode broadcast on 20 September 1994. Karl and his family were created by Neighbours storyliners in an attempt to bring the show back to its roots. Karl was given the job of local GP to provide him with immediate links to other characters. Debuting shortly before his wife, Susan Kennedy (Jackie Woodburne), and appearing continuously since his introduction, he is the longest serving character in the series' history.

== Creation and casting ==
In 1994, the Neighbours' storyliners decided to introduce the "solid" Kennedy family. They felt that they needed to take the show back to its roots when it seemed that all the houses on Ramsay Street were populated with misfits and distant relatives. Karl's wife Susan Kennedy (Jackie Woodburne) was given the job of teacher at the local school and Karl was made the local GP, giving the family immediate links with other characters.

Alan Fletcher had previously starred in Neighbours as Greg Cooper for a three-week guest role in 1987. When the character of Karl Kennedy came up, Fletcher auditioned for the role in the same way as he had for the role of Greg. He was subsequently cast in the show again seven years after his first appearance. Fletcher was pleased when he learned that Woodburne would be playing his character's wife, as they previously worked together on Cop Shop. He commented that they "struck a chord with each other when we first worked together". Fletcher admitted that when he joined the show again he thought he would be there for a year. He stated "I started on a one-year contract and the producers said, 'Do you want to do another year,' and I thought, oh, that is nice. Then my mind started turning towards four years but they kept asking me back. I don't know why."

In 2009, Fletcher celebrated the 15th anniversary of his character's arrival on Ramsay Street. In 2013, Fletcher filmed his 4,500th episode. The following year, Fletcher celebrated 20 years on the show. He commented "I am planning to hang around for quite a while longer because I do love it too much, we're talking at the moment about a continuation." Of his longevity on the show, Fletcher explained that leaving for the US to find work would not have "suited" him or his family, who he said were his "focus the whole time I've been on Neighbours. He said he enjoyed the job too much and thought it would be "perverse" for him to leave something he loved.

== Development ==
=== Marriage to Susan Kennedy ===
Susan and Karl were childhood sweethearts who married in 1978, before they both graduated from university. Karl has cheated on Susan and the couple have broken up and divorced, but they later reunited and have remarried. Karl and Susan are best friends who enjoy each other's company, share a deep connection and take joy in each other's quirks and ways. Woodburne described them as having a "really solid foundation for a marriage" and she has said that she does not want to see Susan and Karl's relationship break up again.

A writer for Holy Soap has called Susan and Karl "contenders for the friskiest couple on Ramsay Street". Following their "passionate arguments", the couple enjoy making up together as they have a healthy attraction for each other. Fletcher says he and Woodburne find the scenes "funny". Fletcher said "Karl and Susan every now and again do go through a phase where they become slightly more amorous than in their tougher times and tougher storylines – suffice to say it's not bawdy, but I think the audience will enjoy the fun aspect". Karl and Susan have been caught in the nude together on three occasions; at the beach, in Lou Carpenter's (Tom Oliver) spa and when they went skinny-dipping in the bush.

=== Character reflection ===
Upon the news that Neighbours would be concluding on 28 July 2022, Fletcher said that the finale would be a "huge celebration of the show, but a celebration that goes back 37 years. It'll be quite memorable." He described Channel 5's decision to cancel the show a "harsh reality", but understood why the decision had been made. When asked of his favourite storyline, Fletcher said, "Well, it's hard to get past the Izzy/Karl/Susan triangle, because unlike the Sarah affair, which was very much an affair, the Izzy storyline was a lot more complex. Karl left Susan mentally for Izzy, before he left her physically. Izzy actually had no interest in Karl. It was only when Izzy found out she was pregnant with another man's child, and that man had died in the Lassiters fire, that she said: 'I'll take you Karl, so you can be the father to my child'. Of course, she faked the date of her pregnancy at the hospital. It was an incredible story. Susan's reaction to Karl having a baby with another woman was spectacular. She really gave it to me in the street. It had many twists and turns and finished beautifully."

Fletcher also stated that he enjoyed comedic storylines, especially the serial's 7000th episode, where Karl shares a nude lunch. Fletcher explained that his least favourite storyline as Karl was when "he got himself a job as a pharmaceutical rep. He discovered that the company that he was working for were selling expired medicines in third world countries", and he thought the storyline unrealistic for Neighbours. Fletcher added that he and Woodburne were "very excited" for Izzy and Malcolm's returns in the final episodes. Upon the idea of Karl and Susan leaving the street at the end of the serial, Fletcher responded, "For me to fulfil my fantasy that Karl and Susan go on holiday on the last episode and turn up over the next year in every UK soap as tourists – for that to happen, I guess we'd have to leave!"

== Storylines ==
Karl met his wife, Susan at university and they had three children together; Malcolm (Benjamin McNair), Libby (Kym Valentine) and Billy (Jesse Spencer). After he is suspected of causing the death of a patient, Karl decides to move his family from the countryside to Erinsborough. The move is initially difficult on the family, but they eventually settle into the community. Karl goes into partnership with Tamsin Caldo (Soula Alexander) at the local medical centre. The children begin causing problems for Karl. Billy befriends Toadfish Rebecchi (Ryan Moloney), who Karl dislikes, while Libby falls for an older guy and Malcolm begins dating Danni Stark (Eliza Szonert). Karl becomes friends with his neighbours, Philip Martin (Ian Rawlings) and Lou Carpenter. He starts treating Kate Cornwall (Christie Sistrunk), a patient with an incurable disease. He develops a close friendship with her and just before she leaves, they share a kiss. When Kate dies, Karl struggles with his grief and admits to Susan that he was attracted to Kate. Karl's father, Tom (Bob Hornery), comes to stay with the family and he reveals he is not Karl's biological father. Karl assures Tom he will always consider him as his father, but he decides to track down his biological father, Ronald Davies-Smythe (Tony Hawkins). Ronald visits the family once, before dying.

Karl clashes with Libby's boyfriend, Darren Stark (Todd MacDonald), and a feud between Karl and Darren's mother, Cheryl (Caroline Gillmer) begins. They later call a truce and when Cheryl is knocked down by a lorry, Karl tries to help her. He gives her painkillers, but Cheryl dies. Karl later realises that Cheryl may have been allergic to the drugs he gave her and thinking he caused Cheryl's death, Karl stops practising medicine. However, when Karl saves Malcolm's life by performing a tracheotomy on him, he decides to resume practising medicine and takes over the lease on the surgery at the Lassiter's Complex. Karl allows Toadie to stay with the family after his own family leave. When Malcolm leaves home, he sends his friend Joel Samuels (Daniel MacPherson) to Erinsborough to stay with Karl and Susan. Karl become attracted to his receptionist, Sarah Beaumont (Nicola Charles). He helps her to become a nurse and when he comforts her about a break up, they kiss. Karl tries to distance himself from Sarah, but she falls for him. Karl tells Sarah that he cannot be with her as he loves Susan. Toadie learns of the kiss and tells Billy, who then tells Susan on the same day that their friends Philip and Ruth are getting married. After breaking down in tears, Susan slaps Karl across the face and asks him to move out of the family home. The separation between Karl and Susan has ramifications for their family and friends; Libby ends her friendship with Sarah and both Libby and Billy side with Susan instead of Karl.

Karl moves into a flat and the distance between Karl and Susan is widened when an old university friend, Martin Chester (Gil Tucker), arrives in Erinsborough and comforts Susan. She kisses Martin, but realises she loves Karl and they reunite. Sarah becomes engaged to Peter Hannay (Nick Carrafa) and on the day of her wedding, Karl gives her a lift. Following the wedding, Karl and Sarah kiss again, before Sarah and Peter leave for good. Karl clashes with new neighbour, Joe Scully (Shane Connor), over the boundaries of their households. Libby gets engaged to Drew Kirk (Dan Paris) and Karl gives her away at the wedding. A few months later, Karl, Susan and Libby attended Malcolm's wedding. Karl offers Susan's nephew, Darcy Tyler (Mark Raffety), a job at the surgery and they later become partners. Darcy tries to convince Karl to sell the practice to a private medical company, but Karl refuses and offers to buy Darcy out of the partnership. Susan slips on some spilt milk and develops retrograde amnesia, which causes her to lose thirty years of her memory. Susan rejects Karl as she cannot remember him and decides to divorce him. Drew dies and Karl supports Libby. Soon after, Susan falls in love with Karl again and they decide to remarry. Susan regains her memory halfway through their vows.

Karl is fined for drink-driving after he has a few glasses of wine at a medical conference and is stopped by the police. He is banned from driving for six months and his fine is doubled when he attends court. Karl starts drinking behind Susan's back and she suspects he is having an affair with Izzy Hoyland (Natalie Bassingthwaighte). Susan's suspicions grow when Karl begins to use breath freshener more often and arrives home at odd hours. However, she is forced to apologise after Karl assures her nothing is going on. Susan discovers Karl's drinking problem when she finds he has drunk a whole bottle of wine and all the scotch. Susan decides they should spend some time apart and she goes to Adelaide. Karl begins spending time with Izzy and when Susan returns, Karl asks her for a trial separation. He later admits that he no longer loves Susan and he moves out and rents a flat nearby. Karl has sex with Izzy and they begin a relationship. Izzy later announces she is pregnant. Susan takes the news badly as does Libby, Malcolm and Billy. Susan files for divorce and they divide their assets without lawyers. They share a kiss and decide to remain friends.

Karl proposes to Izzy, who accepts. After she falls down some steps and miscarries, Izzy begins staying out and partying, while Karl starts drinking again. They sort their issues out and decide to go ahead with the wedding. However, Izzy gets spooked by her ex-boyfriend, Gus Cleary's (Ben Barrack) presence and tries to leave. She returns and Karl forgives her. Karl goes away to the country for the weekend and he suffers a heart attack while changing a tyre on his car. Karl believes he is dying and calls Susan to tell her he loves her. The paramedics arrive and Karl is taken to Erinsborough Hospital, where Susan is waiting. Karl learns he was not the father of Izzy's child and they break up. Susan becomes engaged to Alex Kinski (Andrew Clarke), a man Karl is treating for terminal cancer. Karl urges Alex to tell Susan the truth about his illness, but he refuses. Karl then tells Susan the truth and encourages her to seize her chance of happiness with Alex. Karl begins dating Jenny McKenna (Carrie Barr), but they break up when Jenny realises Karl still loves Susan. Karl acts as a witness at Susan and Alex's wedding and he comforts his former wife when Alex dies hours later.

Karl begins dating Jenny again and he asks her to move in with him. However, when Jenny's political career takes her away from Erinsborough more and more often, they break up again. Karl and Susan start growing closer and after they take care of Tom together, they kiss. They decide to get back together, but keep their relationship a secret from Susan's stepchildren, Rachel (Caitlin Stasey) and Zeke (Matthew Werkmeister). When the children find out, they find it hard to accept, but eventually give the relationship their blessing. Karl moves in with Susan and the children and quits medicine after a mistake on a paternity test. Karl decides to become self-sufficient and plants an organic vegetable patch in the back garden. During a trip to London, Karl and Susan run into a pregnant Izzy and they try to help her out. Karl proposes to Susan and they marry on a boat on the Thames. The ceremony is interrupted when Izzy turns up and goes into labour. Karl helps to deliver her daughter, who she names Holly (Chaya Broadmore). Susan learns Karl is Holly's father and she tells him when they return home. Karl then goes back to London to spend time with his daughter.

When he returns, Karl starts working for Vivex Pharmaceuticals company. He learns some of their drugs are faulty from Steve Parker (Steve Bastoni) and reports this to the company. Trouble-shooter Christian Johnson (Neil Pigot) arrives and tells Karl that some batches had a problem and that it was being dealt with. However, Karl and Steve become suspicious that there is a cover up going on and Karl decides to proof of corruption. Vivex promote Karl and give him his own personal assistant Julia Sanders (Raelene Isbester). Karl and Julia break into a warehouse and to find some proof, but they are caught by security. Julia reveals that Christian is planning to set Karl up and when he is arrested, she admits to the police that Karl is innocent and that she has proof that Christian set everything up. Susan is diagnosed with Multiple sclerosis (MS) and Karl returns to work at the hospital to help out with their finances. Karl befriends Nicola West (Imogen Bailey) and when she takes blood from a patient without permission, he helps her cover it up. Nicola tries to blame her malpractice on Karl and he is suspended by the hospital board. However, Nicola later tells the board that she took the blood and Karl is reinstated.

Zeke goes missing following a rafting accident and Karl and Susan later find him living with Phil Andrews (Robert Mammone). They bring him home and realise he is suffering from amnesia. The family help Zeke recover his memories. A few months later, Karl realises Zeke is suffering from anxiety disorder and he takes him back to the scene of the rafting accident to help him. Karl begins writing a medical column for the local newspaper and he co-presents a radio show on PirateNet with Zeke. Karl is sacked from the radio show when he plays his own music, but Zeke begins a successful campaign for him to be reinstated. Karl suffers a health scare and is taken to the hospital, where he clashes with Doug Harris (Mahesh Jadu). Karl takes part in a Million Paws Walk with Dahl, the Galah, but Dahl goes missing and Karl blames Rebecca Robinson's (Jane Hall) cat. Lou finds Dahl and he and Karl compete to see who can attract her back. Dahl flies into Toadie's house and Toadie brings her back to Karl. Ringo Brown (Sam Clark) asks Karl to be his best man at his wedding to Donna Freedman (Margot Robbie). Karl is devastated when Ringo dies a few months later after being hit by Stephanie Scully's (Carla Bonner) motorbike.

Karl and Susan compete for Citizen of the Year, but they both lose out to Lou. Following a fire at the Scully house, Karl comes up with a plan for a male nude calendar to help raise money for the repairs. He makes a bet with Jade Mitchell (Gemma Pranita), who is overseeing the women's calendar, that whoever raises the most money will win the Men's Shed. The women win, but after seeing the state of the shed, they give it back. When Karl thinks Libby is being consumed by work, he tries to set her up on a date with his colleague, Jonathan Swan (Gary Abrahams). Libby is embarrassed and she fakes a relationship with Lucas Fitzgerald (Scott Major) to get her own back. Susan invites Summer Hoyland (Jordy Lucas) to stay without consulting him and Karl later tells his wife that he thinks they are heading in different directions. He worries that he is not enough for her, but they make up and plan a holiday together. Karl gives Susan's friend, Jim Dolan (Scott Parmeter), some medical advice and manages to rile the new doctor, Rhys Lawson (Ben Barber). Malcolm returns home for a visit and detects all is not well with Karl and Susan. Karl becomes angry when he learns Susan wants to postpone their holiday to care for Jim.

Karl asks Jim to keep his distance from Susan for a while, but later confesses that he overreacted. Karl helps save Jim when he collapses and he later witnesses Susan kissing Jim. Karl and Susan leave the hospital to talk and Jim dies. Susan is angry with Karl for keeping her from Jim and she goes away to plan his funeral. Rhys covers for Karl when he makes a mistake on a prescription form. Karl joins Susan and on their return, they announce they have decided to separate. Malcolm initially blames Susan for the separation, but Karl tells him he initiated it. Karl learns Malcolm is having an affair with Jade and he orders them both to end it. Susan also finds out and is disappointed when she realises Karl knew. When they get stuck in a storage shed, Karl and Susan reminisce about the past and they share a kiss, but Karl realises it was a goodbye and Susan moves out. Susan notices their dog, Audrey, is not well and she and Karl come together for her final days. Susan tells Karl that she wants Audrey to be buried somewhere that she can visit often. They argue, but put aside their differences when Audrey's body, which was placed in an esky, is collected by a hard rubbish collector. Karl rescues the esky and he and Susan bury Audrey at Sonya's (Eve Morey) nursery.

Karl begins dating his colleague Jessica Girdwood (Glenda Linscott). Karl learns Jimmy Edwards, a friend from university, has died and he attends the funeral with Susan, where he sings a duet with Jimmy's widow, Valerie (Grace Knight). Karl later has dinner with Jessica, but feels like he is boring her with stories of Jimmy. He then invites Susan to share a drink with him at home. Jessica finds out about Karl and Susan spending the evening together and tells Karl that he can have her or Susan, but not both. They later end their relationship. Valerie sends Jimmy's drums to Karl and he decides to restart his band, The Right Prescription. He invites Adrian Pearce (Christopher Waters) and Ajay Kapoor (Sachin Joab) to join. Karl expresses a concern for Susan's health when he learns she has taken on extra work at the newspaper office, but she reassures him she is looking after herself. Susan informs Karl that she has a date and he invites her to watch The Right Prescription play their first gig at Charlie's. Karl bonds with Susan's date, Bernard Cabello (Bruce Alexander) and Andrew Robinson (Jordan Smith) offers to manage the band. Karl goes on holiday to Peru, but he cuts the trip short and tells Ajay that he missed having Susan with him.

Karl tries online dating and meets Olivia Bell (Alyce Platt). Karl and Olivia go on a couple of dates, but Olivia rejects a third after realising Karl wants something serious. Susan's sister, Carmel (Kirsty Child), comes to visit and gets on well with Karl. Summer warns Karl that Carmel likes him, but he takes no notice until she tries to make a move on him, which he rejects. After having dinner together on night, Karl and Susan almost kiss. Karl believes that Susan is hiding her feelings for him and he admits that he wants them to get back together. Sarah Beaumont returns to town and she and Karl catch up. He asks her not to tell anyone that they had sex together during their affair, especially Susan. Karl is surprised when Susan gives him divorce papers. He invites Sarah to join him for a drink and they kiss, but soon realise that it was a mistake. Karl tells Susan the truth about how far things went with Sarah and she admits that deep down, she knew. On the way to lodge the divorce papers, Karl changes his mind and goes home. Susan turns up and tells him that she does not want to get divorced either. They forgive each other for their past mistakes and Susan moves back in.

Karl counsels Ajay through his grief when his wife, Priya (Menik Gooneratne), dies and he diagnoses Lucas with testicular cancer. When Steph returns to Erinsborough, Susan hints to Karl that she should stay with them. Thinking about losing Ringo, Karl rejects the idea. However, impressed by how supportive Steph is towards Lucas, Karl relents. Steph opens up to Karl about her time in prison and missing her sons. He becomes concerned when Steph stops taking her anti-psychotic medication and treats her when she suffers a psychotic break. Karl is put out when Ajay asks Georgia Brooks (Saskia Hampele) to fill in for him in the band. Georgia proves to be popular, which initially upsets Karl. But when Ajay leaves town, Karl invites Georgia to join the band permanently. Izzy contacts Karl to tell him that Holly (Lucinda Armstrong Hall) is coming for a visit. Karl is delighted to spend time with his daughter, while Susan is exasperated when Holly is rude to her and Karl does not see she is running rings around them. Karl and Susan realise Holly is not happy that Izzy has seemingly abandoned her and Karl asks Izzy if Holly can stay with him. Susan senses that Holly misses her mother and Karl then takes her back to England. Karl trains for the local fun run, but ends up injuring his ankle. Rhiannon Bates (Teress Liane) and her son, Jackson (Finn Woodlock), move in, when Rhiannon learns Karl is looking for a drummer for his band. When Karl and Susan argue over who should look after Jackson, he runs away, but is found shortly after. Matt Turner (Josef Brown) persuaded Karl to run for mayor against Paul. Karl is disappointed when Susan initially refuses to support his decision. Karl fails to notice Susan having an MS relapse, until Paul announces it at an election debate. He eventually loses the election to Paul, despite having had the opportunity to expose Paul's dodgy past when approached by Paul's enemy Marty Kranic (Darius Perkins). Susan tells Karl that he did the right thing not playing dirty as he would have stooped to Paul's level.

When Karl's pig Lennie and Chop the sheep push through the fence into Number 26 and destroy the vegetable patch, Sheila Canning (Colette Mann) demands that Karl get rid of them. Susan agrees makes Karl realise that the animals would be happier with more freedom and sends them to a hobby farm. Karl visits Holly in London and returns having dyed his hair black. When Susan probes why he has done this, he reveals that someone mistook him for Holly's grandfather and he felt bad. He returns his hair to grey. He and Susan are delighted when Zeke returns to Erinsborough to get married, and Susan realises she wants to be a celebrant. Karl accidentally ruins her first potential ceremony, but as an apology helps her organise the ceremony of Matt and his wife Lauren Turner (Kate Kendall). Susan brings Holly to Australia to surprise Karl, and also hires Libby as stand-in deputy principal for a few weeks. Karl drops hints that Libby should return to Erinsborough permanently, but she cottons on and tells him she is happy with her life away from Melbourne. Karl writes an erotic novel under the name E. M. Williams, but when Susan has a difficult time coping with the attention it receives, Karl asks Lou to pretend to be E. M. Williams.

Alex Kinski's nephew, Nate (Meyne Wyatt), moves in. When a tornado hits Erinsborough, Karl has to guide Susan through an emergency tracheotomy over the phone, when Lou becomes trapped and starts choking. Malcolm visits his parents and informs them that Catherine is pregnant. He asks Susan and Karl to relocate to England and help him and Catherine out with the baby. Susan and Karl reminisce about their time on Ramsay Street and, after speaking with Lou, Toadie and Paul, they decide to stay. Susan tries counselling Nate through his posttraumatic stress disorder, but she becomes affected by Nate's stories and Karl urges her to find a professional for Nate. Karl finds a scratchcard in a card from Malcolm and he wins $7000. He briefly loses it through a hole in his pocket, but finds it at Toadie's house. He commissions Kyle Canning (Chris Milligan) to make him a new bed and Sonya to redesign his garden. Karl visits Lennie and Chop at the farm and decides that he wants another pet. Susan bans him from getting anymore farm animals, and Karl buys a pottery pig as a compromise. He later buys an Axolotl, but becomes spooked by it and gives it to Chris (James Mason) and Nate.

Karl counsels Erin Rogers (Adrienne Pickering) through her drug treatment program, but he is forced to ask a nurse to be present at their meetings when Erin propositions him. After visiting Brad Willis (Kip Gamblin) at the Men's Shed, Karl accidentally picks up a bottle of chemical catalyst that Brad was using to make a surfboard. Karl drinks the liquid, which immediately burns his oesophagus. Karl is rushed to the hospital, but he soon recovers. Karl interviews oncologist Nick Petrides (Damien Fotiou) for a position at the hospital and becomes enamoured with him. Karl later learns Nick has been treating Paul for leukaemia and agrees to keep it a secret. After realising that he has put on weight, Karl forms a cycling club with Toadie, Kyle, Nate and Lou. He bets Susan that he can lose more weight cycling than she can walking. After Nick is exposed and arrested for faking Paul's leukaemia, Karl is tasked with double-checking Nick's patient files. He finds a file on Rhonda Brooks (Kim Denman), Georgia's mother. He approaches her and asks about her treatment, learning that Nick did not take advantage of her. After learning Susan has a separate bank account that contains her mad money, Karl is dared to spend big and so he invests in Daniel Robinson's (Tim Phillipps) Off Air bar. Karl discovers some of his prescriptions have been stolen and Nate's friend Tyler Brennan (Travis Burns) confesses to taking them to get painkillers. After Tyler's brother throws him out of his house, Karl allows him to stay with him and Susan. When Karl suspects Tyler has taken his guitar, Tyler lashes out at him, Karl later apologises when Susan admits to sending it away for repair, and understands that Tyler's reaction relates to his troubled relationship with his father. Karl and Susan argue when he admits to sympathising with Brad, who has feelings for Lauren, despite being married. Karl and Susan's grandson Ben Kirk (Felix Mallard) moves in, while Libby is in China for work.

After Jimmy Williams (Darcy Tadich) is struck by a car while out on his bike, Karl launches a campaign to install bike lanes on the roads. Aaron Brennan (Matt Wilson) helps Karl with the campaign, and Sonya approves the bike lanes, despite opposition. Susan's niece Elly Conway (Jodi Anasta) comes to stay when she gets a job at the school. Karl treats Elly when she is bitten by a snake and suffers a miscarriage. Karl questions his colleague Maureen Knights (Judith Chaplin) about her son Cooper's (Charlie Hannaford) home life, after he suffers a head injury. Cooper soon admits that Maureen caused the injury and she tries to justify her actions to Karl, but he tells her there is no excuse. Karl befriends first year resident David Tanaka (Takaya Honda), who confides in him about his search for his father when he is caught looking at medical records. Karl attends Brad's stag night, and the following day he is one of the first people on the scene when a hot air balloon crashes. He finds a badly injured Regan Davis (Sabeena Manalis) and realises that she will die if he does not help her. He uses a drill to relieve the pressure on her brain. At the hospital, Karl enquires about Regan's condition and Nurse Eve Fisher (Abbe Holmes) informs him that Regan died shortly after surgery. Nurse Fisher reports Karl for malpractice, after she smells alcohol on his breath. Karl tries to help Brad when his health deteriorates due to a mystery illness. Karl takes leave from the hospital, but on his return, he diagnoses Brad with arsenic poisoning. Karl learns Nurse Fisher has a grudge against him for his part in Maureen losing her job and he asks Maureen for her help. The coroner clears Karl of any wrongdoing during the inquest into Regan's death.

Karl buys some jewellery for Susan from Brooke Butler (Fifi Box), but later learns that the jewels are fake. He falls out with the Canning family even though Gary Canning (Damien Richardson) vows to pay him back. Karl becomes concerned for Susan's health when she suffers another MS relapse. He persuades her to go to a retreat in Thailand. When they return, Susan is angry with Karl and it emerges that he tried to bring some seeds and a Durian into the country, but was stopped at customs because of the smell, which he blamed on Susan soiling herself. Karl runs against Sheila for the leadership of the Liveability Committee, but drops out when Sheila blackmails him about the customs incident. She later allows him to take over from her while she deals with her grief at the death of a former partner. Karl's ideas find support from Shane Rebecchi (Nicholas Coghlan), but he is fired after he is wrongly accused of removing the statue from the Lassiter's Complex. Shane is chosen to take over from Karl. They briefly fall out when Shane accuses him and Ben of writing graffiti around the town, and later sabotaging Shane's lawnmower. After Erinsborough wins the Most Liveable Suburb award, Karl argues with Susan and Sonya about how the money should be spent.

Izzy and Holly return to Erinsborough. Izzy informs the Kennedys that she has inherited £41 million from her late husband. She offers to invest in the building of a new hospital wing, as long as Karl receives the naming rights. Izzy soon tells Karl that the real reason she has returned is to ask him to father another child with her. Karl initially considers the offer, which puts a strain on his marriage, but ultimately declines. Izzy then steals his sperm sample from the hospital to impregnate herself. Karl asks Izzy to take a pregnancy test, which is negative. Izzy then admits that she actually wanted Karl back, as she felt happier with him. She leaves Erinsborough without Holly, who stays with Karl and Susan before leaving for a school exchange trip. Karl is tasked with analysing the some test results from a medical trial and discovers participant 18D has a blood clot. Karl soon learns he is 18D and he is diagnosed with Deep Vein Thrombosis (DVT) and put on blood-thinners. After he accidentally cuts his finger, Karl rushes to the hospital and he tells Susan about his condition. Karl tries to raise finds for his new MRI screening project, despite Clive Gibbons (Geoff Paine), the hospital's COO, telling him it will likely fail. Karl's project receives interest from Rita Newland (Lisa Kay), who offers to fund it for a year.

After learning Susan has gone missing in the bush while on a school trip, Karl makes his way out there alone to help with the search. Karl's health deteriorates and he struggles to breathe. He falls down a bank, causing a dislocated knee and a broken leg. Xanthe Canning (Lilly Van der Meer) finds him and calls the emergency services, but she is then forced to perform CPR when Karl's heart stops. Karl is rushed to the hospital where he has to undergo surgery for a pulmonary embolism. Rita tells the Kennedys that she wants to instigate an experimental MS treatment trial at the hospital. Karl supports the idea, and Susan wants to take part in the trial, but Clive opposes it. Karl nominates himself for a vacant seat on the hospital board, so he can put forward Rita's idea. David is also nominated, but Karl wins after Clive votes for him. Clive explains that he did not want to vote against the majority, and that he still does not support the trial. Karl has a minor health scare and Rita hires him an assistant called Patrick, who is actually Finn Kelly (Rob Mills), the man who tampered with Susan's medication in order to take her job. Finn alters the data from overseas studies, causing Karl to be blamed and stood down. He is later cleared, but learns that Rita is no longer funding the MS trial.

Karl becomes Chloe Brennan's (April Rose Pengilly) confidant when he informs her that she has Huntington's disease. He urges her to tell her brothers, as they could have inherited the gene too. Karl starts researching his family tree, and learns he has several half-siblings on his father's side, but none of them want to meet. Karl receives a reply from a half-sister, Jemima Davies-Smythe (Magda Szubanski), who he and Susan try to find. Jemima comes to Erinsborough and ends up replacing Susan as celebrant at Aaron Brennan (Matt Wilson) and David Tanaka's (Takaya Honda) wedding. Karl and Jemima bond over a shared interest in music and songwriting. When Karl learns that Jemima has nowhere to stay, he invites her to move in, upsetting Susan who suspects Jemima is a gold digger. Jemima encourages Karl to redecorate and they take a sledgehammer to some shelves, prompting Susan to ask Jemima to leave. Jemima then reveals that she is actually a millionaire and wants to support them financially for the rest of their lives. Karl and Susan turn her offer down and help her reconcile with her daughter in Boston.

In the 2025 final the whole street including past and present residents are now looking for a new home with the new that a freeway is being built through Ramsey Street. Paul Robinson and Shane Ramsey each come up with a new place Ramsey Hills and Robinson Towers. Before the closing scene Susan, Karl and Paul are stood on Ramsey Street where Susan says she wants to fight to save the street with Karl agreeing and Paul asking “what now” ending leaving it unknown what the outcome will be.

== Reception ==
Fletcher has earned various award nominations for his role as Karl. At the 2007 Inside Soap Awards, Fletcher was nominated for Best Actor, Best Couple (with Jackie Woodburne) and Best Storyline for Susan and Karl's wedding. The following year, Fletcher was again nominated for Best Couple with Woodburne. 2009 saw Fletcher nominated for Best Actor, he was also nominated alongside Woodburne, Valentine, Stasey and Werkmeister for Best Family. At the first Digital Spy Soap Awards ceremony, Fletcher was nominated for Most Popular Actor. He and Woodburne were also nominated for Best On-Screen Partnership, and their 2007 storyline in London was nominated for Storyline of the Year. 2011 saw Fletcher nominated for Best Daytime Star at the Inside Soap Awards. He won the Best Daytime Star accolade in 2016, and he received a nomination in the same category in 2018. In 2025, Karl and Susan received a "Best Soap Couple" nomination at the Digital Spy Reader Awards.

In 2022, Kate Randall from Heat included Karl and Susan in the magazine's top ten Neighbours characters of all time feature. In 2007, Australian newspaper the Herald Sun placed Karl's affair with Sarah at number eight on their list of Neighbours Top Ten moments. They said "In one of the most shocking storylines, no one could believe that the perfect Dr Karl, played by Alan Fletcher, could cheat on his wife of many years, Susan, played by Jackie Woodburne. But, that's exactly what happened when he couldn't resist his receptionist Sarah Beaumont played by the vampy Nicola Charles". In 2015, another Herald Sun reporter included Karl's first kisses with Sarah and Izzy in their "Neighbours' 30 most memorable moments" feature. In 2009, Karl came tenth in a poll by British men's magazine Loaded for "Top Soap Bloke". The following year, he was voted the third "Most Popular Doctor". Karl and Susan were placed at joint second place on the Huffpost's "35 greatest Neighbours characters of all time" feature. Journalist Adam Beresford described Karl as a "the doctor with the implausibly broad array of medical specialisms." He believed that Susan and Karl were a "dream team" and "the bedrock of Ramsay Street". He assessed that the Kennedy's were a "a solid, dependable family unit" until Karl's affairs. He was also certain that "whatever life throws at them, Karl and Susan will make it." In 2021, Karl was placed eighth in a poll ran via soap fansite "Back To The Bay", which asked readers to determine the top ten most popular Neighbours characters. In a feature profiling the "top 12 iconic Neighbours characters", critic Sheena McGinley of the Irish Independent placed Karl as her eighth choice. She stated that Karl has "pinballed from upstanding pillar of the community to alcohol dependent, to veg patch enthusiast, and back to being a conscientious doctor." Lorna White from Yours profiled the magazine's "favourite Neighbours characters of all time". Karl was included in the list and was hailed a "Neighbours icon". Sam Strutt of The Guardian compiled a feature counting down the top ten most memorable moments from Neighbours. Strutt listed Karl and Izzy's affair in sixth place and scathed "Dr Karl just couldn’t keep it in his pants." He concluded that the countless stories the affair birthed was "classic soap fodder".

In 2010, to celebrate Neighbours' 25th anniversary Sky, a British satellite broadcasting company profiled 25 characters of which they believed were the most memorable in the series history. Karl is in the list and describing him they state: "Karl and Susan became a truly legendary soap couple in an age when they have become thin on the ground. On paper, it's not quite clear why – they're just a pleasant, middle-class couple, and Karl can be a bit moany sometimes. But the important thing is it works, and watching the writers break them up and put them back together several times has made for great telly. And you know it's only a matter of time before Karl adds another unexpectedly sexy neighbour to his cheatin' list..." Nicky Branagh from Studentbeans.com included Karl in her list of the "Top ten hottest Aussie soap guys" and she stated "It's not worth thinking about a Ramsay Street without Dr Karl Kennedy in it. Now in his 18th year in the role, Alan Fletcher has charmed Neighbours viewers with his medical skills, smooth moves and his tendency to parent anyone who walks through the Kennedy door. Now a smooth crooner and frequenter of student nights in the UK to boot, Fletch has made it to the top of our ultimate Aussie soap heart-throbs list."

Michael Cregan for Inside Soap enjoyed the pottery pig storyline, saying "Never let it be said that life is dull on Ramsay Street. Now that Karl Kennedy has got a massive pottery pig called Elvis, what could possibly go wrong? Apart from a few filthy looks from Susan of course..." Ben Pobjie of The Sydney Morning Herald thought Karl's "peculiar childlike enthusiasm that makes him such great comic relief" was "his most endearing feature apart from his tendency to periodically have affairs with younger women."
