= Alyce Platt =

Australian actress, television presenter, singer and songwriter (born 1963)

- Born: Alyce Mary A. Platt; 19 December 1964 (age 61); Melbourne, Australia
- Occupations: Actress; television presenter; singer; songwriter
- Years active: 1983–present
- Musical career
- Origin: Sydney, New South Wales, Australia
- Genre: Pop
- Instruments: Voice, guitar
- Label: Sound Vault
- Website: alyceplatt.com

Alyce Mary A. Platt (born 19 December 1964) is an Australian actress, television presenter, singer and songwriter.

As an actress, she had roles in the TV soap operas Sons and Daughters as Amanda Morrell, and Neighbours.

Platt worked as a TV presenter and game show host, including cohost to Tony Barber on quiz show Sale of the Century from 1986 to 1991. Also a musician, Platt released her debut album, Beautiful Death, in April 2004.

In 2012, Platt started playing another role in Neighbours, that of Olivia Bell, a potential love interest for Karl Kennedy. In May 2020, Platt resumed the part of Olivia for a second guest stint and returned again for another stint the following year.

== Early life ==
Alyce Mary Platt was born on 19 December 1964 and grew up in Melbourne with her parents, her mother an Australian and her father was born in England, she has two older brothers. From the age of 12 she was singing in competitions. At 16 she attended Box Hill Technical College for a two-year drama course.

== Career ==
=== Acting ===
Platt's acting roles include the regular part of Amanda Morrell in Sons and Daughters from 1983 to 1985; a guest role as Stephanie Collins in the short-lived serial Family and Friends in 1990; and as Sarah Wilkes in Ten's version of A Country Practice in 1994.

In 1995, Platt appeared as a reporter in the "My Lovely Girl" episode of Halifax f.p.. That same year, she joined the-long-running soap Neighbours, playing the regular part of Jen Handley. However, Jen was written out after just a year when writers struggled to come up with stories for the character. She told Sue Malins of the Daily Mirror; "In the end, I don't think the scriptwriters knew what to do with me." Her last episode as Jen aired in March 1996.

Platt had a recurring roles on Blue Heelers as Jeanette Holbrook in 2000; City Homicide from August 2007 and a lead role in the children's television series The Elephant Princess as Anita Wilson.

The role that brought her most recognition was that of co-host of the then top-rated quiz show Sale of the Century from 1986 to 1991. She returned to this role for one special episode of Temptation on 14 March 2007, during the show's "Battle of the Network Shows" series, in which Temptation's hosts Ed Phillips and Livinia Nixon were contestants themselves. She later appeared alongside former Sale co-host Tony Barber on TV1's Cash Trivia Challenge.

On 9 August 2012, it was announced Platt had re-joined Neighbours for a guest role as a new character, Olivia Bell. Eight years later, in a February 2020 interview for The Courier, Platt stated she had returned to Neighbours. She said, "I've gone back to Ramsay Street; I'm doing a little bit on Neighbours at the moment, which is wonderful. I'm enjoying it a lot, actually." Platt's management company confirmed that she would be returning as Olivia Bell, and her return scenes aired on 6 May 2020. She returned for another stint in 2021.

=== Music ===
Platt launched her debut album, Beautiful Death, on 4 April 2004 at the Corner Hotel. Carmine Pascuzzi of MediaSearch website said that she "does a decent job in providing an adventurous foray through her honest and melancholic musical thoughts. It's a collection of material spanning several years. The songs are mostly told with positive feeling and the hope for better things." Her second album, Live from the Vault, appeared in August 2006. Her third album, Funny Little World, was issued in November 2015.

She wrote and performed the music for the documentary Journey Beyond Fear in 2018.

== Filmography ==
=== Television ===
| Year | Title | Role | Type |
|---|---|---|---|
| 1983–85 | Sons and Daughters | Amanda Morrell | TV series |
| 1986–91 | Sale of the Century | Co-host | TV game show |
| 1990 | Family and Friends | Stephanie Collins | TV series |
| 1994 | A Country Practice | Sarah Wilkes | TV series |
| 1995 | Halifax f.p. | Reporter | TV series, episode: "My Lovely Girl" |
| 1995–96 | Neighbours | Jen Handley | TV series |
| 2000 | Blue Heelers | Jeanette Holbrook | TV series |
| 2007 | City Homicide | | TV series |
| 2007 | Temptation | Co-host | TV game show, 1 episode |
| 2008 | The Elephant Princess | Anita Wilson | TV series |
| | TV1's Cash Trivia Challenge | | TV game show |
| 2012, 2020–21 | Neighbours | Olivia Bell | TV series |

== Personal life ==
In August 2004, Platt married Claude Carranza.
