= Justin Holborow =

Australian actor

- Born: Justin Bevis; 17 September 1996 (age 30); Sydney, Australia
- Occupation: Actor

Justin Holborow, is an Australian actor, best known for his roles as Harley Canning in Eleven's Neighbours, Jack Stewart in Reef Doctors, and as Griff in the TV adaptation of Conspiracy 365.

== Early life and education ==
Holborow was born on 17 September 1996 in Sydney, Australia. His mother, Sarah Holborow, is a designer. He has one younger sister, Tahli Bevis.

Holborow moved to Bangkok at the age of 12, where he was educated at Harrow International School for over a year, where he played Bugsy in a production of Bugsy Malone, after which he moved back to Sydney with his mother and sister, where he was educated at Newtown High School of the Performing Arts. After being cast in Reef Doctors at the age of 14, he moved to Queensland, where he continued his education part-time. Holborow currently lives in Sydney.

== Filmography ==
Year	Title	Role	Notes
2012	Conspiracy 365	Griff	TV miniseries, 2 episodes
2012	Reef Doctors	Jack	TV series, 13 episodes
2012	Neighbours	Harley Canning	TV series, 24 episodes
2016	Boys in the Trees	Jango	Feature film
2016	Deep Water	Young Adamski	TV miniseries, 2 episodes
2018	A Suburban Love Story	Doug	Feature film
2023	Crazy Fun Park	Remus	TV series, 9 episodes
