= Lionheart (1987 film) =

1987 adventure film directed by Franklin J. Schaffner

- Promotional film poster
- Directed by: Franklin J. Schaffner
- Screenplay by: Menno Meyjes; Richard Outten
- Story by: Menno Meyjes
- Produced by: Talia Shire; Stanley O'Toole
- Starring: Eric Stoltz; Gabriel Byrne
- Cinematography: Alec Mills
- Edited by: David Bretherton; Richard Haines
- Music by: Jerry Goldsmith
- Distributed by: Orion Pictures
- Release date: August 14, 1987
- Running time: 104 minutes
- Countries: Hungary; United States
- Language: English

Lionheart, also known as Lionheart: The Children's Crusade, is a 1987 adventure film directed by Franklin J. Schaffner and produced by Talia Shire and Stanley O'Toole. Shire's brother, Francis Ford Coppola, initially planned to direct the film but instead opted to be executive producer along with Shire's husband, Jack Schwartzman. The screenplay was written by Menno Meyjes and Richard Outten from a story by Meyjes. The composer Jerry Goldsmith wrote the score. The film was released in August 1987. It was distributed by Orion Pictures.

== Plot ==
Loosely based on the historical Children's Crusade, the story follows Robert Nerra, an exiled young knight, played by Eric Stoltz, who leads a band of orphans to join the Third Crusade with King Richard the Lionheart while protecting the children from the Black Prince (Gabriel Byrne), a disillusioned crusader turned child slave trader (not to be confused with the real-life Edward, the Black Prince).

== Cast ==
- Eric Stoltz as Robert Nerra
- Gabriel Byrne as Black Prince
- Nicola Cowper as Blanche
- Dexter Fletcher as Michael
- Deborah Moore as Mathilda
- Nicholas Clay as Charles De Montfort
- Bruce Purchase as Simon Nerra
- Neil Dickson as King Richard
- Penny Downie as Madelaine
- Nadim Sawalha as Selim
- John Franklyn-Robbins as The Abbot
- Chris Pitt as Odo
- Matthew Sim as Hugo
- Paul Rhys as Mayor of the Underground City
- Sammi Davis as Baptista
- Wayne Goddard as Louis
- Courtney Roper-Knight as David
- Michael Sundin as Bertram (incorrectly credited as "Michel Sundin")
- Louise Seacombe as Girl from Plague Village
- Patrick Durkin as Fat Peasant
- Haluk Bilginer as Merchant
- Ralph Michael as William Nerra
- Barry Stanton as Duke De Bar
- Jan Waters as Duchess De Bar
- Ann Firbank as Catatonic Woman

== Production ==
Lionheart was filmed in Hungary and Portugal, utilizing several castles and hundreds of Slavic children hired as extras. The movie was Schaffner's penultimate film and was his final collaboration with his friend Jerry Goldsmith. The two had previously worked on numerous films together, including The Stripper, Planet of the Apes, Patton, Papillon, Islands in the Stream, and The Boys from Brazil.

== Soundtrack ==
The soundtrack of the movie was released in 1987 by Varèse Sarabande. Separated into two albums, it featured Jerry Goldsmith conducting the Hungarian State Opera Orchestra. In 1994 the label released a one-disc edition titled Lionheart: The Epic Symphonic Score featuring all of Volume 1 and six tracks from Volume 2. Then in the summer of 2021, the complete score was released as “The Deluxe Edition” (on two discs).

Volume One

No.	Title	Length
1.	"The Ceremony"	2:42
2.	"Failed Knight"	3:18
3.	"Robert and Blanche"	3:49
4.	"Children in Bondage"	5:02
5.	"The Banner"	5:58
6.	"The Lake"	3:37
7.	"Mathilda"	5:57
8.	"The Wrong Flag"	3:16
9.	"King Richard"	8:34
Total length:		42:13

Volume Two

No.	Title	Length
1.	"The Castle"	1:26
2.	"The Circus"	3:07
3.	"Gates of Paris"	2:09
4.	"The Plague"	5:33
5.	"Final Fight"	3:13
6.	"The Road from Paris"	2:04
7.	"The Dress"	2:23
8.	"Forest Hunt"	7:45
9.	"Paris Underground"	4:09
10.	"Bring Him Back"	2:39
11.	"The Future"	5:45
Total length:		40:12

Lionheart: The Epic Symphonic Score

No.	Title	Length
1.	"The Ceremony"	2:42
2.	"Failed Knight"	3:18
3.	"The Circus"	3:07
4.	"Robert and Blanche"	3:49
5.	"Children in Bondage"	5:02
6.	"The Road from Paris"	2:04
7.	"The Lake"	3:37
8.	"The Banner"	5:58
9.	"The Castle"	1:26
10.	"Mathilda"	5:57
11.	"The Wrong Flag"	3:16
12.	"The Dress"	2:23
13.	"Forest Hunt"	7:45
14.	"Final Fight"	3:13
15.	"King Richard"	8:34
Total length:		62:11

Lionheart: The Deluxe Edition-Original Motion Picture Soundtrack
Disc I

No.	Title	Length
1.	"The Castle (Main Title)"	1:26
2.	"The Ceremony"	2:49
3.	"Bring Him Back"	2:39
4.	"Failed Knight"	3:21
5.	"The Circus"	3:07
6.	"Robert and Blanche"	3:49
7.	"Bondage*"	1:51
8.	"Black Prince*"	1:55
Total length:		20:57

Disc II

No.	Title	Length
1.	"Children In Bondage"	5:02
2.	"The Future"	1:58
3.	"Gates Of Paris"	2:09
4.	"Paris Underground"	4:09
5.	"The Road from Paris"	2:04
6.	"The Banner/The New Court"	5:58
7.	"The Dress"	2:23
8.	"Mathilda"	5:57
9.	"The Plague"	5:33
10.	"Forest Hunt"	7:45
11.	"The Lake"	3:37
12.	"The Wrong Flag"	3:16
13.	"Final Fight"	3:13
14.	"King Richard/End Title (Robert's Theme)"	8:34
Total length:		61:41

- previously unreleased bonus tracks sourced from reference materials as original master tapes were unavailable

== Release ==
The distributor, Orion Pictures, delayed its theatrical release but when the film was finally shown in August 1987 in Canada, the limited release garnered negative reviews. Therefore, the movie was largely unseen until being shown on pay television and finally released on VHS tape and DVD.

Leonard Maltin's initial review was anything but complimentary: "A weak script does in this spiritless saga...Intended for kids, but too silly and boring to engage them." Maltin later saw the film again, and changed his rating from "BOMB" to 3-out-of-a-possible-4 stars: "Richly produced, well-acted, with a superb Jerry Goldsmith score; it's a shame this sincere, if slight, film received almost no theatrical release." Variety's reviewer watched the film at the Cineplex Odeon Canada Square theatre in Toronto on August 18, 1987. The review appeared in the August 26, 1987 issue describing the movie as "a flaccid, limp kiddie adventure yarn with little of its intended grand epic sweep realized" and accurately predicted that the movie "should head straight for the home video shelves".

== Home media ==
Warner Home Video brought out a VHS tape in July 1994 and issued a DVD in December 2009 on the Warner Archives label.

== See also ==
- Nash, Jay Robert and Stanley Ralph Ross. The Motion Picture Guide 1988 Annual. Evanston, Illinois: CineBooks, Inc., 1988, pp. 165–166.
- Weinberg, Marc. "Hidden from a Theatre Near You" in Orange Coast Magazine, June 1989, p. 248.
