= James Mason (Australian actor) =

Australian actor

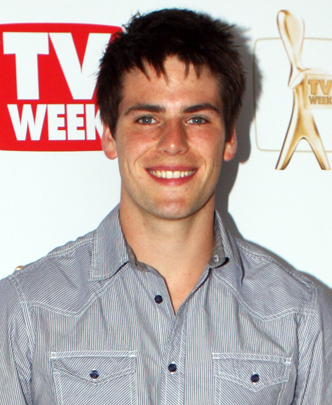
- Mason at the 2012 Logie nominations
- Born: Australia
- Occupation: Actor
- Years active: 2008–present
- Spouse: Christina Arampatzi (m. 2025)
- Children: 1
- Website: jamesmason.com.au

James Mason is an Australian television and film actor and producer. He started his career participating in a series of short films and commercials. He then secured the role of Chris Pappas on the Australian soap opera Neighbours. Chris was the show's first ever gay male regular character and won Mason wide recognition, including a Logie nomination for Most Popular New Talent in 2012.

He left Neighbours in 2015 to pursue other projects. He began to appear in more short films, web series and later secured roles in the films 36 Questions, William Kelly's War and Slaughterhouse. In 2018 the actor joined the cast of Network Ten drama series Playing for Keeps, playing Jack Davies, a gay Australian Football League (AFL) player whose death forms the main narrative of the show's first season.

== Early life ==
Mason studied a Theatre Studies VCE at Monbulk College from 2006 until 2007. Mason had always enjoyed acting during High School but only decided to pursue it as a career during his final school years. His father Adrian Mason and mother Aylee Sunstrom were supportive of his career aspirations. He is bilingual and can speak both English and Swedish.

== Career ==
Mason began his career starring in a number of independent short films and television commercials during 2008 and 2009. The actor rose to prominence playing the role Chris Pappas on the Australian television soap opera Neighbours. Mason's agent secured him an audition for the role of Andrew Robinson – actor Jordan Smith won the role of Andrew, but three days later Mason was offered the chance to play Chris. Chris is the show's first gay ongoing character. Neighbours' then executive producer Susan Bower created the character following requests from viewers in the Neighbours website discussion forums. Two-thirds of actors quit the audition process for Chris when they discovered the character was gay. Mason began filming for Neighbours in October 2009 and the character arrived on-screen during February 2010. Mason said that he was "really excited" to play the role and added the writers had helped him to accurately portray a gay male. Chris was initially a guest character, but Mason was later promoted to the show's regular cast. For his portrayal of Chris, Mason was nominated for Most Popular New Male Talent at the Logie Awards of 2012. The actor filmed for an unaired television pilot titled SPIN in 2013. In 2015, Mason decided to leave Neighbours after five years in the role.

Mason secured a lead role in the 2018 film 36 Questions. The film focuses on a couple who go on a date under unusual circumstances. The actor's involvement with the film began in 2014, when he was still starring in Neighbours. The movie was supposed to be released that year but only made it to post-production in 2017. In 2015, Mason secured a guest role in Ben Nicholas' web series titled Footballer Wants a Wife. In 2016, he presented a travel documentary titled Budget Backpacker: Iceland. He travelled to Iceland and profiled his journey visiting tourist destinations for the video, which was released online. In 2017, he filmed a guest role in a DCF Studio television production titled Bernie Brown.

Mason took on more acting work during 2018. He played lead role of Jacob in the comedy web series titled Freudian Slip, which premiered in March. Then in May it was announced that he had secured the role of Jack Davies in the Network Ten drama series Playing for Keeps, a show is about a group of AFL players and their wives' personal lives. Jack is another gay character Mason has played and the series also centres around the scandal of his death.

In 2019 Mason had a role in the 2019 series Ms Fisher's MODern Murder Mysteries. He also filmed a lead role in the independent film The Slaughterhouse Killer as Nathan. In 2022, Mason reprised his Neighbours role for what was intended to be the show's final episodes. Mason will appear in the upcoming film titled Residence.

== Personal life ==
Mason married his partner, actress Christina Arampatzi in October 2025. They have one child, a daughter, born in March 2022.

== Filmography ==
=== Film ===
Year	Title	Role	Notes
2009	Eleven	Dean Webb	Short film
2009	The Quiet	Miko	Short film
2009	Clean Slate	Marcus	Short film
2009	Change	David Bland	Short film
2010	Contender/Skirmish/The Itch	Adrian	Short film
2014	Killervision	Darren	Film
2014	Nice Guys Read Plath	Tutor	Short film
2014	William Kelly's War	Constable Sam Johnson	Film
2015	Newman	Leroy	Film
2017	Jack Caine	Harry Bradshaw	Short film
2018	So That's How it Happened	Joe	Short film
2018	36 Questions	Jacob	Film, lead role
2020	The Slaughterhouse Killer	Nathan	Film, lead role
2022	Darklands	David Romans	Film
2025	Residence	Cormac the Chiro	Film
2025	Sacrifice	Nicholas Swift	Film

=== Television ===
Year	Title	Role	Notes
2010–2015, 2022	Neighbours	Chris Pappas	Regular role
2013	SPIN	Branley David	Unaired TV pilot
2015	Footballer Wants a Wife	Nigel West	Guest role
2018	Freudian Slip	Jacob	Web series
2018	Playing for Keeps	Jack Davies	Regular role
2019	Ms Fisher's MODern Murder Mysteries	Eric Wild	Guest role
2020	Bernie Brown	Medieval Knight	Guest role

== Awards and nominations ==
Year	Format	Association	Category	Nominated work	Result
2012	Television	Logie Awards	Most Popular New Male Talent	Neighbours	Nominated
