= Dead Sleep =

- Film poster
- Directed by: Alec Mills
- Written by: Michael Rymer
- Produced by: Stanley O'Toole
- Starring: Linda Blair; Tony Bonner
- Cinematography: John Stokes
- Edited by: David Halliday
- Music by: Brian May
- Production company: Village Roadshow Pictures
- Release date: 1990
- Country: Australia
- Language: English

Dead Sleep is a 1990 Australian horror film directed by Alec Mills, about a series of suspicious deaths that occur in a psychiatric ward. The cast includes Linda Blair, veteran Australian actor Tony Bonner and Vassy Costiopoulos. The film went straight to video.

== Plot synopsis ==
Based on the Chemsford Hospital scandal involving Dr. Harry Bailey, Maggie Healy (Linda Blair) works at a mental hospital and learns the grisly truth about Dr. Jonathan Heckett (Tony Bonner) who performs suspicious operations on comatose patients.

== Cast ==
- Linda Blair as Maggie Healey
- Tony Bonner as Dr. Jonathan Heckett
- Andrew Booth as Hugh Clayton
- Christine Amor as Sister Kereby
- Sueyan Cox as Kaye
- Brian Moll as Dr. Shamberg
- Vassy Cotsopoulos as Thena Fuery
- Craig Cronin as Dr. Harry Lark
- Peta Downes as Jessica Sharp
- Suzie MacKenzie as Wendy
- Russell Krause as Orderly
- Slim de Grey as Mr McCarthy
- Graham Matters as Patient
- Mike Bishop as Policeman

== Production ==
The film was one of three low budget films produced as part of Village Roadshow’s 'The Silver Series', including slasher horror Bloodmoon and action film Hurricane Smith. The Silver Series reflected a departure from stereotypical Australian films of the past. The intention was to appeal to a new international market, based on the drawcard that films could be produced in Australia at a significantly lower cost than in the USA.
