= Stanley O'Toole =

British film producer (1939–2004)

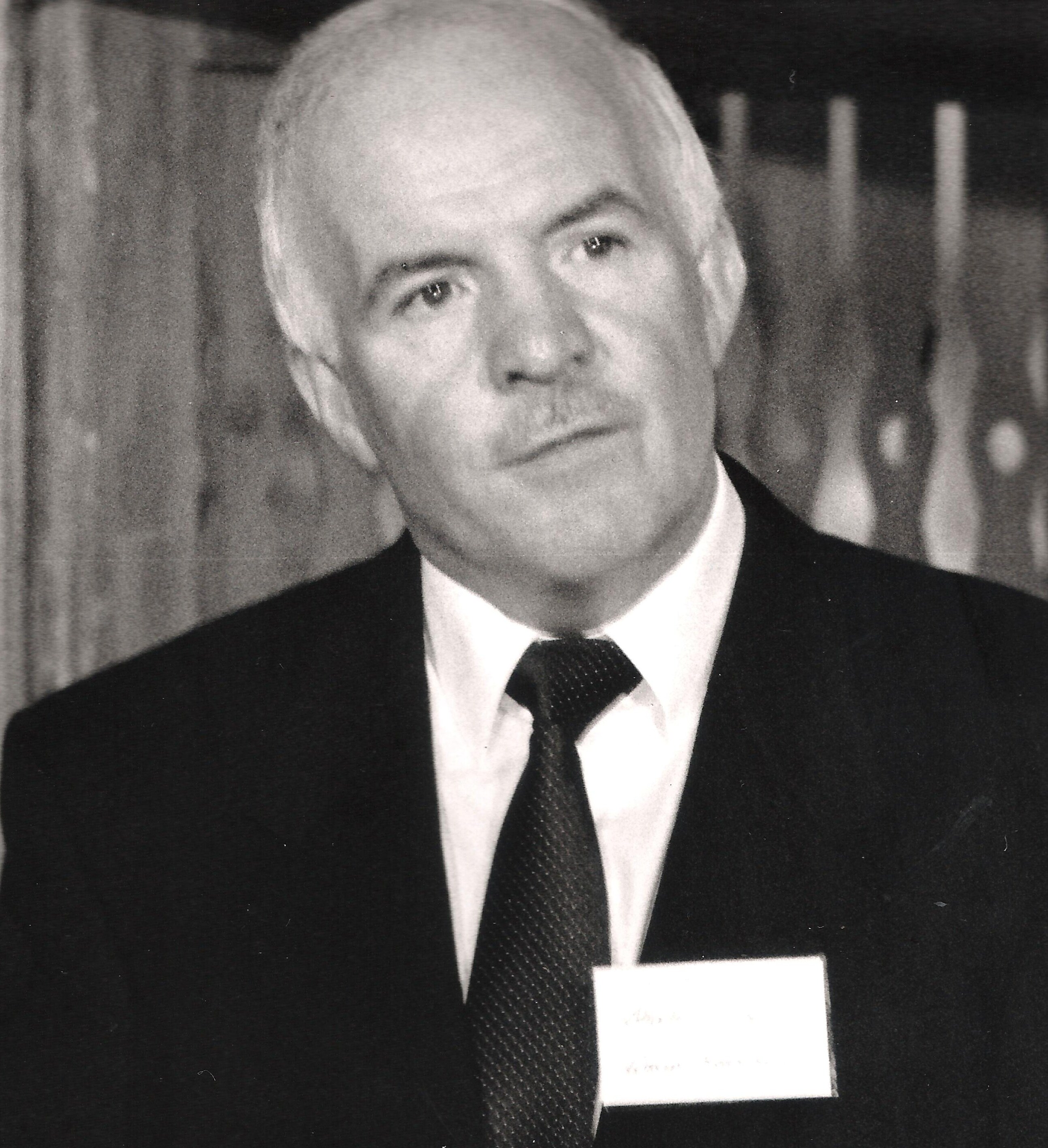
- O'Toole in 1990
- Born: Stanley O'Toole; 16 January 1939
- Died: 12 June 2004 (aged 65)
- Occupations: Film producer, studio executive
- Years active: 1959–1992

Stanley O'Toole (16 January 1939 – 12 June 2004) was a British film producer. His best known productions include: The Boys from Brazil, Enemy Mine, Quigley Down Under, and Outland. O'Toole has produced works for the top studios in the world including, Columbia, Paramount, Warner Bros., MGM, Universal, and 20th Century Fox.

== Career ==
=== Early years ===
Stanley O'Toole entered the film industry, accidentally, in 1959, as a payroll clerk for the Rank Organisation. He had travelled to Pinewood Studios with a friend who was applying for a job He climbed the studio wall and saw a job advertised in the Rank Payroll Department.

Stanley was installed as chief cost accountant for Paramount Pictures Europe division in 1966. In 1967, he was promoted to Head of Production for Paramount Pictures in Europe. He oversaw European production of various films including Downhill Racer and The Italian Job. During his tenure at Paramount, he reported to Charles Bludhorn, and worked closely with Robert Evans.

=== 1970s ===
In 1970, Stanley started a film production company with two friends – Gareth Wigan and David Hemmings. Based in London, it was called "Wigan Hemmings O'Toole". Films produced include Unman, Wittering and Zigo and Running Scared.

The 1970s was Stanley's most prolific period of film making. 1973 saw the release of The Last of Sheila on which Stanley was executive producer for Warner Bros. It had an ensemble cast featuring James Coburn, Raquel Welch, Ian McShane and James Mason, among others. It was directed by Herbert Ross, who Stanley worked with on two other projects, The Seven-Per-Cent Solution and Nijinsky.

In 1975, Stanley was associate producer on Operation Daybreak for Warner Bros. Directed by Lewis Gilbert, it was shot mostly on location in Prague and was based on the true story of the assassination of Reinhard Heydrich.

Stanley prepared a Warner Bros. project about the Entebbe Raid in Israel, but the project ended up being shelved and was never made. Stanley was quoted as saying:

As filmmakers, we were committed to producing the most definitive version of the Entebbe raid, and Israel was committed to protecting state secrets. We couldn't go on.

An Israeli government spokesperson said this was not the case, and that they helped as much as possible. It was on this project that Stanley first met Franklin J. Schaffner, whom he would go on to work with on three other films, including The Boys from Brazil and Sphinx.

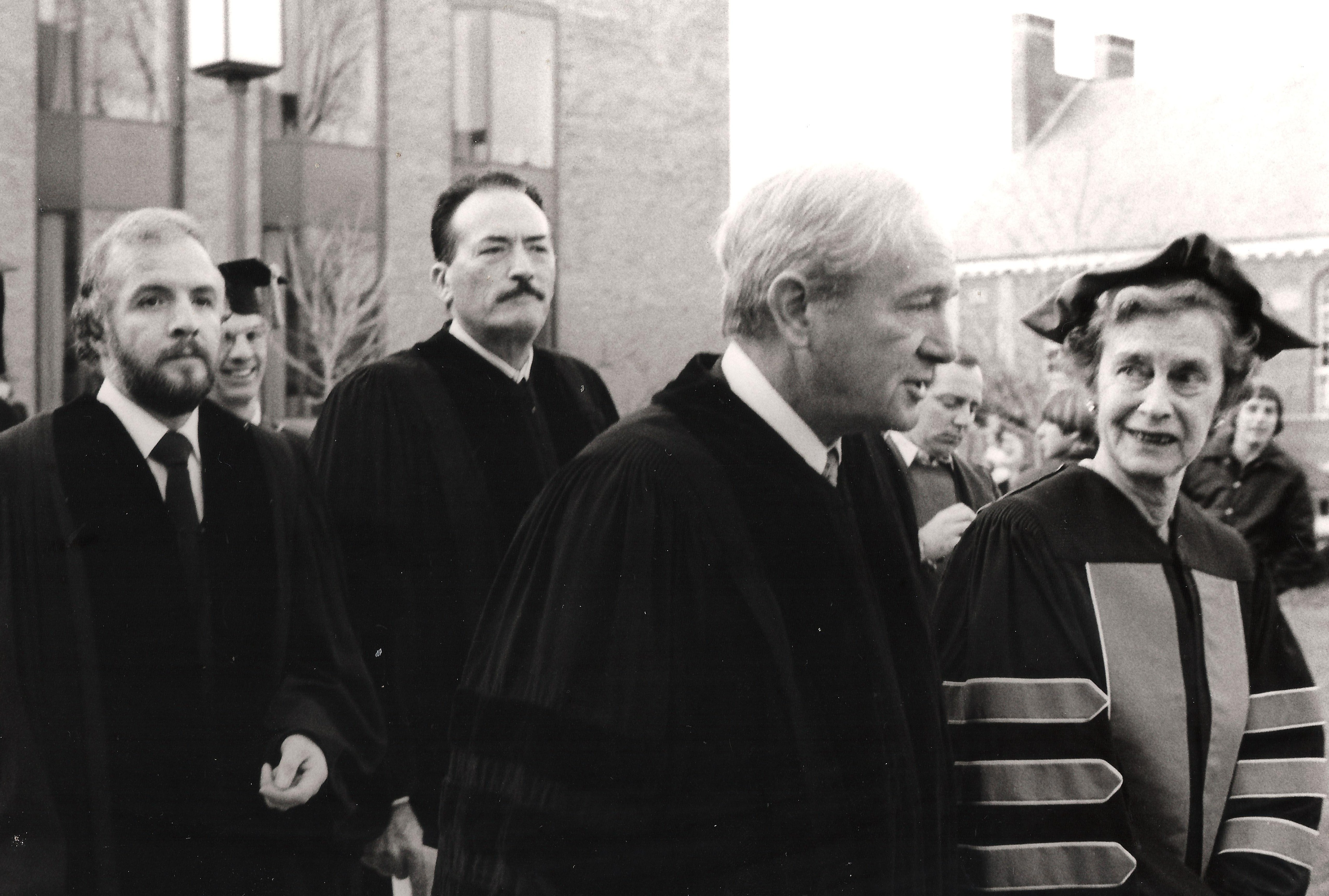
(from far left) Stanley O'Toole, Gregory Peck, Franklin J. Schaffner outside Franklin & Marshall College after accepting an honorary degree in 1977

1976 saw the release of Academy Award-nominated The Seven-Per-Cent Solution, on which Stanley was associate producer. It was received well by critics, Variety said it was "an outstanding film" and Rotten Tomatoes give it a 90% rating.

Schaffner's The Boys from Brazil, released in 1978, based on Ira Levin's best-selling novel, starred Sir Laurence Olivier, Gregory Peck and James Mason. It was the story of Joseph Mengele's (played by Gregory Peck) attempt to resurrect Adolf Hitler through cloning, and attempts made by Nazi hunter Ezra Leiberman (played by Sir Laurence Olivier) to stop him. The film was shot in various locations including Vienna, Austria, Shepperton Studios, England, Portugal and the US.

A close friend of Stanley's was Sir Laurence Olivier, who appeared in two of his films. On 5 December 1977, Franklin J. Schaffner, Sir Laurence Olivier and Gregory Peck were each awarded an honorary degree, Doctor of Humane Letters from Franklin & Marshall College. Due to illness Sir Laurence was unable to accept his award, so, with permission of Queen Elizabeth II and the British Embassy, Stanley represented Sir Laurence in accepting his award.

Remembering their partnership on The Boys from Brazil and the aborted Entebbe project, Franklin J. Schaffner and Stanley O'Toole bought the rights to Robin Cook's The Sphinx. Being one of the first producers to see the benefits of shooting films in Eastern European countries, Stanley decided they would shoot most of the film in Budapest, Hungary. Having shot Nijinsky and numerous other films there, this was an area he knew well. There were also filming locations in Egypt. Sphinx was not received well by critics, however, but made its budget back and was the number one film in Japan, the second largest market in the world at the time.

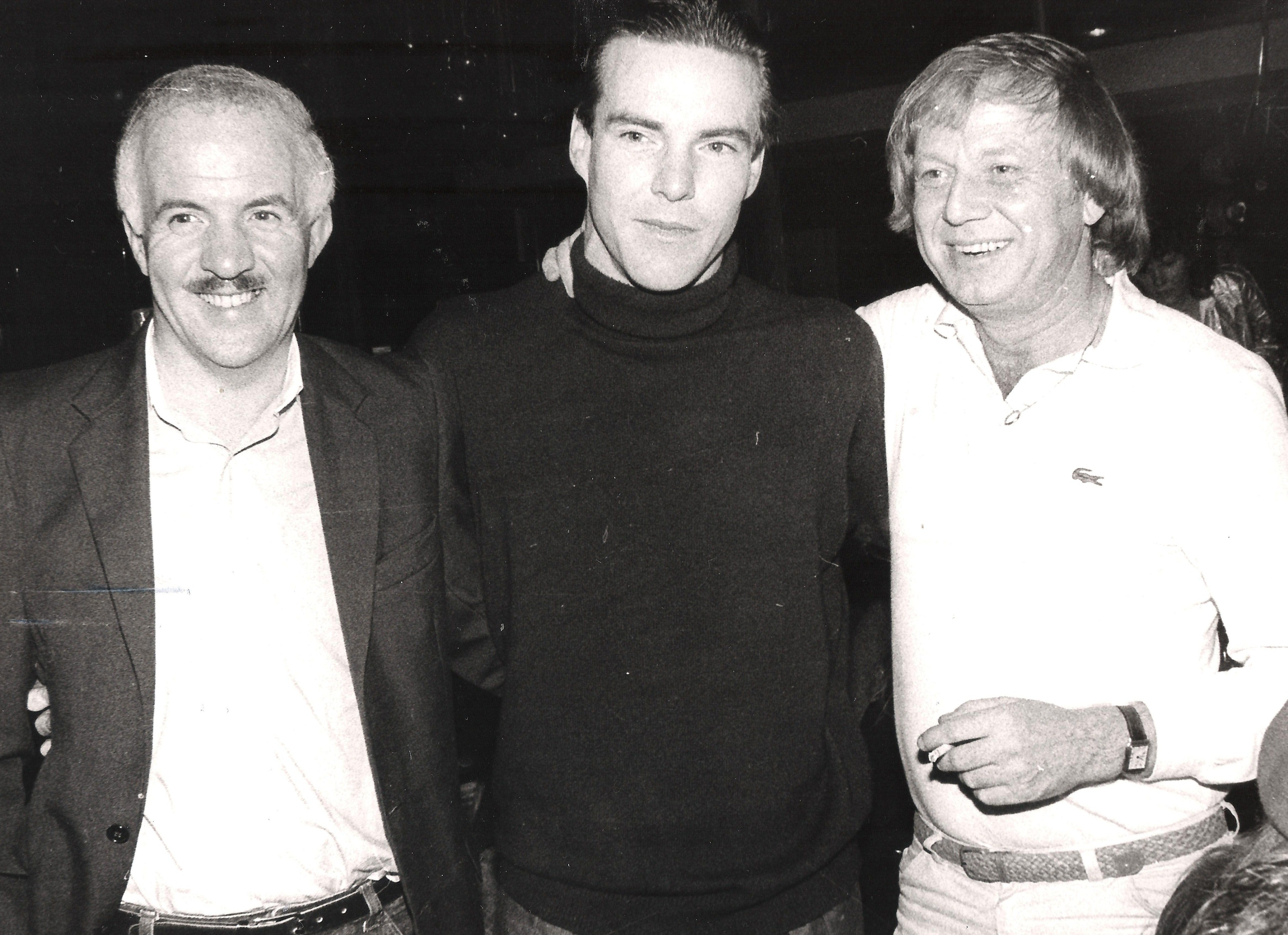
(from left) Stanley O'Toole, Dennis Quaid, Wolfgang Petersen whilst filming Enemy Mine in 1984

=== 1980s ===
Stanley served as Executive Producer on Outland, released in 1981, starring Sean Connery. It was nominated for an Academy Award. The 1980s saw Stanley produce other big budget productions such as Enemy Mine, starring Dennis Quaid and Louis Gossett Jr., and Schaffner's Lionheart, starring Gabriel Byrne.

In 1981, Stanley worked with Barbra Streisand on Yentl, Streisand's directorial debut, though he has no producer credit on the film.

In the late 1980s, Stanley was made managing director of Village Roadshow, based in Australia. He took over from Dino De Laurentiis, who almost brought the studio to an early end. During his time at Village Roadshow, Stanley oversaw the production of numerous films, including The Delinquents, Quigley Down Under, Hurricane Smith, Bloodmoon and Dead Sleep.

=== 1990s ===
Warner Bros. installed Stanley as managing director of Warner Bros. and he oversaw the physical production of all projects outside North America. Films made during this time include The Secret Garden, Executive Decision and preparation of Andrew Lloyd Webber's The Phantom of the Opera.

== Filmography ==
Selected filmography from 1969 to 1992.

Year	Title	Director	Starring
1969	The Italian Job	Peter Collinson	Michael Caine, Noël Coward
1969	Downhill Racer	Michael Ritchie	Robert Redford, Gene Hackman
1971	Unman, Wittering and Zigo	John Mackenzie	David Hemmings
1972	Running Scared	David Hemmings	Robert Powell, Gayle Hunnicutt
1973	The Last of Sheila	Herbert Ross	James Coburn, Raquel Welch, James Mason, Ian McShane, Dyan Cannon, Richard Benjamin, Joan Hackett
1975	Operation Daybreak	Lewis Gilbert	Timothy Bottoms, Anthony Andrews, Martin Shaw
1976	The Seven-Per-Cent Solution	Herbert Ross	Sir Laurence Olivier, Robert Duvall, Alan Arkin, Vanessa Redgrave, Nicol Williamson, Joel Grey
1977	The Squeeze	Michael Apted	Stephen Boyd, Stacy Keach, David Hemmings
1978	The Boys from Brazil	Franklin J. Schaffner	Sir Laurence Olivier, Gregory Peck, James Mason, Steven Guttenberg
1980	Nijinsky	Herbert Ross	Alan Bates, Jeremy Irons
1981	Sphinx	Franklin J. Schaffner	Frank Langella, Lesley-Anne Down, John Gielgud
1981	Outland	Peter Hyams	Sean Connery, Peter Boyle
1982	The Island of Adventure	Anthony Squire	John Rhys-Davies
1983	On the Third Day	Stanley O'Toole	Richard Morant
1985	Enemy Mine	Wolfgang Petersen	Dennis Quaid, Louis Gossett Jr.
1987	Lionheart	Franklin J. Schaffner	Gabriel Byrne, Dexter Fletcher, Eric Stoltz
1990	Quigley Down Under	Simon Wincer	Tom Selleck, Alan Rickman, Laura San Giacomo
1990	Bloodmoon	Alec Mills	Leon Lissek
1990	Dead Sleep	Alec Mills	Linda Blair, Tony Bonner
1992	Hurricane Smith	Colin Budds	Carl Weathers, Jürgen Prochnow, Tony Bonner
