= Bloodmoon (1990 film) =

Australian 1990s horror movie

- Theatrical release poster
- Directed by: Alec Mills
- Written by: Robert Brennan
- Produced by: Stanley O'Toole
- Starring: Leon Lissek; Christine Amor; Ian Williams; Helen Thomson; Craig Cronin
- Cinematography: John Stokes
- Edited by: David Halliday
- Music by: Brian May
- Production companies: Michael Fisher Productions; Village Roadshow Pictures
- Distributed by: Roadshow Entertainment (Australia); Carolco Pictures (United States)
- Release date: 22 March 1990 (Australia)
- Running time: 100 min.
- Country: Australia
- Language: English
- Box office: A$419,769 (Australia)

Bloodmoon is a 1990 Australian slasher film directed by Alec Mills and starring Leon Lissek, Christine Amor, Ian Williams, Helen Thomson, and Craig Cronin. The title refers to the Hunter's moon, the first full moon after the Harvest Moon.

== Plot ==
Religious Sister Mary-Ellen keeps an eye over her charges at Saint Elizabeth's, an elite Catholic girls' school that has a chapel and boarding dormitories. Mrs. Sheffield was the newly arrived and appointed headmistress, and her husband commenced serving as the school's science teacher.

There is some conflict between the youth of Winchester School, a private school 'for young men', and the local youth. This first was an altercation at the nearby beach signed as 'Coopers Beach', and during the school dance when fire hoses were used.

Young couples meet in the nearby forest, the school's lovers' lane. One day, young people start to turn up dead under dramatic circumstances. These events began with sixteen-year-old Jackie and Winchester private boys school student Richard Hampton.

At the school dance, a glam rock band plays while the students from the two schools fraternise. One couple goes into the nearby forest when the hint of the murderer appears, holding a circle of barbed wire. However, the arrival of polka-dot-dressed Gretchen with Winchester's Stuart/Stewart disturbed both the first couple and the murderer. The murderer returns and dispatches Stuart.

On the Sunday Mrs Sheffield comes together in her bed with one of the Winchester students in the teacher's residence, before her science teacher husband returns. He is aware of her ongoing infidelities, while she treats him with disdain. Mr Sheffield takes a knife to the yearbook photograph of a student, Mary. At a nearby waterfall and watering hole, Mary and Kevin share a kiss. Two students, Michelle and Jennifer, also enter the science classroom looking for the Monday examination paper, and chances on a bottle of fingers and eyeballs; a barb-wire garrote hanging on the cupboard door. Michelle is bashed by Sheffield, Jennifer slashing him with a knife. She escapes but falls down the stairs; where Sheffield dispatches her with the knife. With his blood-soaked shirt, Sheffield sees Kevin return Mary to the school, Kevin and Mary then kissing. When the police officer attends, Sheffield pretends to call his wife to come to the building, but indicating she was feeling ill. He lamented missing Boston (the officer however noticing photographs in the room however show California vehicle number plates).

Sheffield then cuts the outgoing telephone lines, calls Mary, and suggests he is passing on a message about Kevin, to meet 'him in the woods at 9:00 p.m.' beside the auditorium. The police officer returns to the station and has a call put through to California, aware earlier that Sheffield was making a fake call. The officer has connected students murdered in California to the disappearance of Saint Elizabeth's students. Separately a female student, Linda, makes a public payphone call to Kevin with a message from Mary, as required by Sheffield before he ceases Linda's life.

Mary heads off to the lovers' lane in the rain Sunday night. Myles Sheffield watched Mary leave, but Virginia Sheffield arrives to go out for dinner and belittles him; he also admits he has 'done it again'. She leaves, and he goes to the science room to get the garrote when confronted in that room by the Sister. He then hits her.

Meanwhile, Mary has arrived in the woods. A police officer finds the murdered schoolgirl in the telephone booth. Kevin arrives at the lovers' lane, and Virginia Sheffield is packing her luggage. Virginia's student lover returns to her bedroom; she tries to pack while he tries to cavort; she also protests and warns that 'all the goblins are coming out tonight'.

The police officer interrupts the choir in the school chapel and attends the Sheffield residence to be reprimanded by Mrs. Sheffield for intruding. He fires a revolver shot to warn her to speak the truth. The officer then heads to the woods, as Myles Sheffield tries to garrote Kevin, and Mary tries to hit Sheffield with a stick. As Sheffield is strangling Mary and is about to use a knife, the police officer draws his firearm before being fatally stabbed in the chest by Sheffield. When Sheffield goes toward Mary, Sister Mary-Ellen advances and throws a bottle of liquid onto him, which drives him away before she slumps down.

A blood-soaked Sheffield stumbles back to a residence of the local priest and takes a shotgun from a cabinet. With lightning around, he returns to his residence finding Virginia there. A shotgun is discharged, then again.

== Cast ==
Listed by credit.

- Leon Lissek as Myles Sheffield, Saint Elizabeth's science teacher, and a lover of cats
- Christine Amor as Virginia Sheffield, Saint Elizabeth's new headmistress, and wife of Myles
- Ian Williams as Kevin Lynch, a local Coopers Beach boy with an interest in Mary Huston
- Helen Thomson as Mary Huston, Saint Elizabeth's student, vice-captain of Wills House, whose actress mother resides in California. Mary at one point calls her mother in the USA on telephone (213) 555 2716
- Craig Cronin as Matt Desmond, the police sergeant (credited as Craige Cronnin)
- Hazel Howson as Sister Mary-Ellen, a puritan but insightful nun
- Suzie MacKenzie as Michelle, Saint Elizabeth's student concerned about her grades
- Anya Molina as Jennifer, Saint Elizabeth's student and associate of Michelle
- Brian Moll as Mr Gordian, Winchester's long-time headmaster
- Stephen Bergin as Mark
- Christophe Broadway as Scott
- Samantha Rittson as Gretchen, Saint Elizabeth's student
- Tess Pike as Kylie
- Jo Munro as Jackie, girlfriend of Winchester School's Richard Hampton
- Michelle Doake as Linda, who made a public telephone box call
- Chris Uhlmann as Chip
- Justin Ractliffe as Zits
- Warwick Brown as Billy, a local boy
- Gregory Pamment as Rich
- Sueyan Cox as Sandy Desmond, wife of the police sergeant
- Narelle Arcidiacono as Mrs Bacon
- Michael Adams as Mr Owens
- Sue Lawson as Mrs Owens
- Jonathan Hardy as the mayor
- Elizabeth Williams as a teacher
- David Clendenning as a teacher
- Jane Dormaier as a teacher
- Helen Strube as a teacher
- Les Evans as Kevin's father
- Ray Turner as a police officer
- Shawn Kristofer as a police officer (also the film's production runner)
- Kate Riley as the police sergeant's daughter
- Sean Anderson as the police sergeant's baby son
- Kesha Loy
- Lisa Hamilton
- Matthew Smith as Murphy, a local kid
- Karen Miers as Susan
- Melodie Brutnall as the stunt double for 'Jennifer' (who falls down the stairs)
- Ashley Burgess, Chris Hawkins, Scott Hogan, Ben Wyatt as stunt personnel
- Lindy-Jo Free as choir mistress
- Stuartholme Choir as the Saint Elizabeth's school and chapel choir

== Production ==
The film was shot on the Gold Coast, Brisbane, and the Warner-Roadshow Studios. Many of the school shots are from the grounds at Marist College Ashgrove, and the dance scene was filmed at Mount Saint Michaels, with local students used as extras. The production uses a pre-1990s Queensland Police Force uniform for the local officer, having the shoulder patch and rank chevrons on the sleeve; the police vehicle having the standard plain sticker with police wording on the front doors. The officer has the 'sergeant first class' insignia.

The title song Bloodmoon was set to music by Brian May, with lyrics by Hunt Downs, and sung by Vice.

The film was one of three low budget films produced as part of Village Roadshow’s 'The Silver Series', which also included thriller Dead Sleep (starring American actress, Linda Blair) and action film Hurricane Smith. The Silver Series reflected a departure from stereotypical Australian films of the past. The intention was to appeal to a new international market, based on the drawcard that films could be produced in Australia at a significantly lower cost than in the USA.

== Release ==
In Australia, the film was released with a "fright break" towards the end where the audience had a chance to walk out and claim a refund.

It was later featured in 2008 documentary film Not Quite Hollywood: The Wild, Untold Story of Ozploitation!.

== Critical reception ==
AllMovie called it a "silly Australian slasher film". Jim Schembri wrote in Cinema Papers that:

It is an unspeakably funny film, but in the saddest possible way. It is a film promoted as a horror film, and it is for anyone with any faith left in Australian mainstream film... For a film as awful, as cliche ridden, as derivative as unimaginative and as poorly made as Bloodmoon to be made in Australia in 1990 is a cause of national mourning.
