= William Kelly's War =

- Film poster
- Directed by: Geoff Davis
- Written by: Josh Davis; Matthew John Davis
- Produced by: Phil Avalon; Kevin Jones; James Vernon
- Starring: Tony Bonner
- Cinematography: Damien Beebe
- Edited by: Andrew Knight; Digby Hogan
- Music by: Phil Lambert
- Distributed by: Flying Bark Productions; StudioCanal
- Release date: October 2014
- Running time: 106 minutes
- Country: Australia
- Language: English

William Kelly's War is a 2014 Australian film, set during World War I. It was directed by Geoff Davis, and written by his sons Josh and Matthew.

== Cast ==
- Tony Bonner as Mr. Kelly, patriarch of the family.
- Josh Davis as William 'Billy' Kelly, an Australian soldier
- Matthew John Davis as Jack Kelly, brother of Billy
- Ella McIlvena as Jess Kelly, sister of Billy
- Helen Davis as Marjorie Kelly, matriarch of the family
- Lachy Hulme as Paddy, cousin of the Kellys
- James Mason as Constable Sam Johnson
- Maureen Alford

== Production ==
The battle and trench scenes were shot on the Davis family farm in Victoria, with fortifications being made from chipboard, mud, and cement. The homestead was located at Coal creek.

== Release ==
The film was originally titled The Stolen when it premiered in Cannes in May 2014 and was released in theatres across rural Victoria on 30 October that year.
