= Christine Amor =

Australian actress (born 1952)

- Born: Christine Debra Amor; Brisbane, Queensland, Australia
- Occupation: Actress
- Years active: 1967–present
- Known for: Prisoner (TV series) (known internationally as Prisoner: Cell Block H) as Jean Vernon; Are You Being Served? (TV series) (Australian Version)

Christine Debra Amor is an Australian actress of stage, television and film.

== Career ==
Amor was born in Brisbane, Queensland. She graduated from the National Institute of Dramatic Art (NIDA). She has acted extensively in television guest roles and in Australian film starting in 1967. Her film roles include Alvin Purple (1973), Petersen (1974), Snapshot (1979).

Amor's early television roles include appearances in Belllbird, Matlock Police, Division 4, Certain Women, Young Ramsay, Chopper Squad. and Glenview High.

She is possibly best known for her role in cult classic TV series Prisoner during the first season in 1979, as social worker Jean Vernon.

Amor later took a regular role in the Australian version of sitcom Are You Being Served?. She was the female junior in the program's second season in 1981.

Amor was also a leading cast member of the drama series Carson's Law (1983–1984). She later played the role of Miss Chatham in the Australian television series H_{2}O: Just Add Water (2006).

Amor became a Civil Marriage Celebrant working in the state of Queensland.

== Filmography ==
=== Film ===
Year	Title	Role	Notes
1973	Alvin Purple	Peggy	Feature film
1974	Petersen	Annie	Feature film
1977	High Rolling	Teenage girl	Feature film
1979	Snapshot	Paula	Feature film
1980	Touch and Go	Sue Fullerton	Feature film
1983	Now and Forever	Margaret Burton	Feature film
1988	Prisoner of Zenda	Voice	Animated film
1990	Bloodmoon	Virginia Sheffield	Feature film
1990	Dead Sleep	Sister Kereby	Feature film
2008	Not Quite Hollywood: The Wild, Untold Story of Ozploitation!	Herself	Feature film documentary
2019	Rebirth	Mother Moreen	Film short
2021	Sit. Stay. Love.	Aunt Claire	Feature film
2022	Redemption	Sue	Film short

=== Television ===
Year	Title	Role	Notes
1967	Bellbird	Josie	TV series
1973	A Taste for Blue Ribbons		TV series
1973	Matlock Police	Sandra Williams	TV series, 1 episode
1973–74	Division 4	Sally Mathews / Cindy Morris / Kerry Michaels	TV series, 3 episodes
1973	Ryan	Jennifer	TV series, 1 episode
1974	Marion	Sue Rogers	TV miniseries, 1 episode
1974–75	Certain Women	Gillian Stone	TV series, 17 episodes
1977–79	Cop Shop	Sharon Vernon / Betty Stephens / Jan Reading / Janet Carter	TV series, 6 episodes
1977	Young Ramsay	Diana Frost	TV series, 1 episode
1978	Chopper Squad	Lauren	TV series, 1 episode
1978	Glenview High		TV series, 1 episode
1979	Ray Lawler Trilogy	Kathy 'Bubba' Ryan	TV miniseries, 2 episodes
1979	Prisoner	Jean Vernon / Jean	TV series, 29 episodes
1980	Spring & Fall	Angela	TV series, 1 episode
1981	Are You Being Served?	Miss Nicholls	TV series, 8 episodes
1981	Holiday Island	Lauren Evans	TV series, 1 episode
1981	I Can Jump Puddles	Rose	TV miniseries, 1 episode
1981-1982	Home	Christine	TV series, 6 episodes
1983–1984	Carson's Law	Felicity Bryce / Felicity Carson	TV series, 184 episodes Nominated Best Supporting Actress in a Series 1985 Logie Awards
1984	Special Squad	Robyn Symons	TV series, 1 episode
1986	Saturdee	Ma Gimble	TV series, 10 episodes
1991	Eggshells	Vanessa	TV series, 13 episodes
1992	Animal Park		TV series
1992	The World Tonight	Guest	TV series, 1 episode
1992	The New Adventures of Skippy	Di	TV series, 1 episode
1993	Ernie and Denise	Guest	TV series, 1 episode
1994	Under the Skin		SBS TV series, 1 episode
1995	Eat My Shorts		TV series, 1 episode
1998	Misery Guts	Mrs. Herman	TV series, 2 episodes
2001–02	Cybergirl	Mayor Burdette Buxton	TV series, 11 episodes
2006	H_{2}O: Just Add Water	Louise Chatham	TV series, 9 episodes
2009	East of Everything	Matron	TV series, 2 episodes
2025	Good Cop/Bad Cop	Marla	Episode 1.1

=== Other appearances ===
Year	Title	Role	Notes
2023	Studio 10	Herself	TV series, 1 episode
1993	Today	Herself	TV series, 1 episode
1993	Review	Guest Presenter	TV series, 1 episode
1993	Inside Edition	Herself	TV series, 1 episode

== Stage ==
=== As performer ===
Year	Title	Role	Venue / Company
1971	The Beggar's Opera	Suky Tawdry	Old Tote Theatre
1971	Women Beware Women	Bianca	Old Tote Theatre
1971	Peer Gynt		Old Tote Theatre
1971	Under Milk Wood		NIDA
1971	The Balcony	Horse Girl / Wounded Girl	Old Tote Theatre
1972	Trelawny of the Wells		Parade Theatre
1972	The Taming of the Shrew		Parade Theatre, Canberra Theatre
1972	The Good Woman of Setzuan		Parade Theatre
1972	Tartuffe		Parade Theatre
1972	Forget-Me-Not Lane		Parade Theatre & Old Tote Theatre
1972	How Could You Believe Me When I Said I'd Be Your Valet When You Know I've Been a Liar All My Life?		Parade Theatre & Canberra Theatre
1973	Playing the Piper	Madame Pinchard	
1973	Come Blow Your Horn		St. Martin's Theatre
1973	The Plough and the Stars		Russell Street Theatre
1973	Batman's Beach-Head		Comedy Theatre, Melbourne with Melbourne Theatre Company
1973	Paying the Piper		Comedy Theatre, Melbourne
1975	The Ride Across Lake Constance		Nimrod Theatre
1976	Some of My Best Friends Are Women		St Martin's Theatre
1976	Old Flames	Sally	Victorian College of Arts
1976	Other Times	Bubba Ryan	Russell Street Theatre
1977	Summer of the Seventeenth Doll	Bubba Ryan	Russell Street Theatre
1977	The Doll Trilogy		Russell Street Theatre with MTC
1977	The Pleasure of His Company	Jessica Poole	Theatre Royal Sydney, Comedy Theatre, Melbourne
1978	Once a Catholic	Mary McGinty	Theatre Royal, Sydney, Russell Street Theatre
1980	No Room For Dreamers	Ada	Newcastle Civic Theatre
1980	The Beecham Pill		Parramatta Correctional Centre
1986	Same Time Next Year		Bridge Theatre, Coniston
1990	That Blessed Fountain		Regal Theatre, Perth
1992	Conjugal Rites	Genevieve	The Playhouse, Bridge Theatre Coniston, Seymour Centre
1992	Money and Friends	Vicki	QTC tour of Sydney Opera House with STC, Arts Centre Melbourne with MTC, Playhouse at Adelaide Festival Centre with STCSA, Theatre Royal, Hobart, Canberra Theatre Centre & Queensland regional tour with NARPACA
1992	The Heidi Chronicles	Fran / Debbie / Betsy / April	Cremorne Theatre with Queensland Theatre Company
1993	Brilliant Lies	Marion	Canberra Theatre, Suncorp Theatre Brisbane, Playhouse Melbourne, Monash University, Her Majesty's Theatre Ballarat, Ford Theatre Geelong, West Gippsland Arts Centre, Theatre Royal Hobart, Playhouse Adelaide, Sydney Opera House
2009	The School of Arts	Muriel Hayes	Playhouse Brisbane, Blackwater Cultural Centre, Pilbeam Theatre, Biloela Civic Centre, Mundubbera Shire Hall, Chinchilla Cultural Centre, Warwick Town Hall
2016	Quartet	Cecily Robinson	Playhouse Brisbane, Empire Theatre, Toowoomba, Lake Kawana Cultural Centre, Pilbeam Theatre, Mackay Entertainment Centre, Centre of Contemporary Arts Cairns, Townsville Civic Theatre, Gladstone Entertainment Centre, Ipswich Civic Centre, Gold Coast Arts Centre
2020	The Children		Cremorne Theatre

=== As crew ===
Year	Title	Role	Venue / Company
2007	Circus Girl	Sound Designer	Parade Theatre, Orange Civic Theatre, Theatre Royal, Hobart, Princess Theatre, Launceston

== Radio ==
Year	Title	Role	Venue / Company
1979	Incompletions	Skeleton	ABC Radio Sydney
1979	Laura and the Angel	Maria	ABC Radio Sydney
