= Village Roadshow Pictures =

American film production company

- Logo used since 2019
- Type: Subsidiary
- Industry: Film
- Predecessor: De Laurentiis Entertainment Limited
- Founded: 1989; 37 years ago
- Founder: Greg Coote
- Fate: Chapter 11 bankruptcy; library sold to Alcon Entertainment
- Successor: Alcon Entertainment (library only)
- Headquarters: Los Angeles, California, United States
- Area served: Worldwide
- Products: Motion pictures
- Parent: Vine Alternative Investments and Falcon Investment Advisors (majority); Village Roadshow (2%)

Village Roadshow Pictures is an Australian-American film production company founded in 1989. It is a division of Village Roadshow Entertainment Group (VREG), which in turn is majority-owned by Vine Alternative Investments and Falcon Investment Advisors, with the Australian company Village Roadshow holding a 2% minority stake.

The company has produced films, including as co-productions with Warner Bros., such as The Matrix series, Ocean's series, The Lego Movie, Happy Feet, Mad Max: Fury Road, American Sniper, Sherlock Holmes, Cats & Dogs, and Joker. The films in the Village Roadshow library have achieved 34 No. 1 U.S. box office openings and won 19 Academy Awards (from 50 nominations) and six Golden Globe Awards.

Village Roadshow Pictures self-distributed its filmed entertainment through affiliates in several territories around the world, including Australia, New Zealand, and Singapore (the latter through Golden Village). JPMorgan Chase and Rabobank also provide funding for the company's film slate with Warner Bros. Village Roadshow Pictures had a second slate co-financing agreement with Sony Pictures, which ended in 2016. The company filed for Chapter 11 bankruptcy in March 2025, with its library sold to Alcon Entertainment for $417.5 million on 18 June 2025.

== History ==
Village Roadshow Pictures was founded in 1989 by Greg Coote, who served as president, when it purchased certain assets of De Laurentiis Entertainment Group. The company’s first film was The Delinquents and its first hit was Fortress in 1992. In 1993, Village Roadshow Pictures expanded into television production with the launch of its first television series Paradise Beach.

In 1995, Village Roadshow Pictures launched a television division headed by Jeffrey Hayes. Also that year, the company started an international sales division called Village Roadshow Pictures International, which was led by Bobby Myers. In 1996, Village Roadshow Pictures Television and Yoram Gross formed a joint venture focused on animation.

In April 1997, Village Roadshow Pictures and Intermedia formed a joint venture called Village Intermedia Pictures. The deal ended several months later when Village Roadshow Pictures and Intermedia decided to cut ties and became independent again. In September 1997, the company underwent restructuring with Michael Lake joined the company as managing director. In October 1997, Yoram Gross-Village Roadshow signed a co-production alliance with EM.TV & Merchandising a Munich-based distribution and merchandising company to partner on 10 animated series over the next five years.

In December 1997, Village Roadshow Pictures and Warner Bros. signed an agreement to co-finance and distribute at least 20 movies over the next five years. Under the deal, Village Roadshow would produce the films and Warner Bros. would market and release them worldwide, except in Australia and New Zealand. Bruce Berman, the former Warners’ theatrical production president, signed on as chairman and CEO of the company.

In 1998, Village Roadshow Pictures announced that it would sell its television division in a management buyout to Greg Coote and Jeffrey Hayes, who renamed Village Roadshow Pictures Television to Coote/Hayes Productions. Around the same time, the company announced it was shutting down the international sales unit. As part of its exit plan from the sales business, Roadshow sold international rights to its Western productions to Icon Entertainment International and the Australian films to Beyond Films Limited. Also that year, Village Roadshow Pictures sold off its 50% stake in the Yoram Gross animated studio venture to EM.TV & Merchandising, which would become Yoram Gross-EM.TV.

In 2006, through a group led by Act III Communications, Norman Lear and his partner Hal Gaba purchased 50% of Village Roadshow Pictures (VRP). Their entity, Crescent Film Group, included long-time colleague Michael Lambert through Lambert Media Group and Clarity Partners as investors. Crescent invested $115 million for its interest in VRP. Village Roadshow Pictures used the $115 million invested by Crescent to repay an inter-company loan of $100 million owed to its parent company, as well as pay a $15 million dividend to the existing VRP shareholders and management.

In 2008, Concord Music Group merged into Village Roadshow Pictures to form Village Roadshow Entertainment Group (VREG). Investors in VREG included the shareholders of Crescent, as shown above, as well as Australia's Village Roadshow Limited and Tailwind Capital.

In 2012, Warner Bros. Pictures and Village Roadshow Pictures extended their co-financing first look deal through 2017. In May 2014, VRPG established a supplementary co-financing production deal with Sony Pictures Entertainment which commenced with the release of The Equalizer and Annie. A second agreement was made due to the large amount of available capital. In 2013, Concord Music Group was sold to Wood Creek Capital, an affiliate of MassMutual, for approximately $120 million.

In 2015, VREG, the holding company of Village Roadshow Pictures and Village Roadshow Television, was recapitalized with a $480 million investment that included funds from Falcon Investment Advisors and Vine Alternative Investments. Vine Alternative Investments and Falcon Investment Advisors added additional capital in April 2017 to take a controlling stake in the company. This was to fund a new strategic plan for an expanded film slate and add production of television programs and other content offerings.

More recently, Phantom Four Films signed a first look deal with Village Roadshow Pictures. On 27 September 2021, Bruce Berman announced that he would step down as CEO of the company. On 24 December 2021, the company had signed a pact with Fox Entertainment to distribute pictures for Tubi and partnered with Kevin Garrett to launch Black Noir Cinema.

In March 2025, the Village Roadshow Entertainment Group filed for Chapter 11 bankruptcy, citing an overly ambitious studio expansion, staff layoffs, and an ongoing arbitration dispute with Warner Bros. Pictures for breach of contract over the simultaneous release of The Matrix Resurrections. The former Australian parent company had to issue press statements stating it has had no control over the company since 2017, and has since commenced action to revoke VREG of the right to use the company's name and logo. Around the time bankruptcy was filed, Content Partners had reportedly placed a stalking horse offer of $353–365 million for the assets of VREG. However, in April 2025, Alcon Entertainment outbid Content Partners with a higher offer of $416.5 million, with the company being approved as the new stalking horse bid by Delaware bankruptcy judge Thomas Horan, who also set a deadline of 16 May for other interested bidders, if any, and a 20 May auction date if more than one party showed up. VREG was to file notice within a day of the bidding deadline whether it would prefer holding an auction for its assets or sell them directly to Alcon, with Horan scheduling the hearing date for the transaction's approval for 11 June. On 18 June 2025, it was announced that Alcon's stalking horse bid worth $417.5 million had succeeded, giving it rights to VREG's library of 108 films, including intellectual properties, distribution rights, cash flows, overall rights and royalties, as well as its development slate of films and television series; distribution rights to titles co-financed with Warner Bros. were retained by the latter. On 5 November 2025, Alcon was also awarded derivative rights to most of the titles it had acquired for $18.5 million following a hearing in a Delaware court. Warner Bros. tried matching Alcon's offer, subsequently submitting a revised bid of $19.5 million, and offered to release certain claims from an arbitrary dispute with VREG, only for the latter to make a counterclaim of $30 million in cash and settlement of undisclosed claims from the dispute; Warner Bros. rebuked the counter offer and is considering appealing the Delaware court's decision. On 8 May 2026, it was announced that VREG had paid Warner Bros. $57 million and had relinquished their stake in The Matrix Resurrections.

== Filmography ==
=== Feature films ===
==== 1980s ====
Title	Distributor	Release date	Notes	Budget	Box office
The Delinquents	Warner Bros.	December 21, 1989	First film	$9 million	N/A

==== 1990s ====
Title	Distributor	Release date	Notes	Budget	Box office
Bloodmoon	Carolco Pictures	March 22, 1990		N/A	$419,769
Blood Oath	Skouras Pictures	July 26, 1990	co-production with Sovereign Pictures, Charles Waterstreet Productions and Siege Productions	$10 million	$707,194
Until the End of the World	Warner Bros.	December 25, 1991		$23 million	$752,856
Dead Sleep	Vestron Video	January 29, 1992		N/A	
Hurricane Smith	Warner Bros.	January 31, 1992		$5 million	$89,467
The Power of One	Warner Bros.	March 27, 1992	co-production with Regency Enterprises, Le Studio Canal+ and Alcor Films	$18 million	$2.8 million
Turtle Beach	Warner Bros.	May 1, 1992	co-production with Regency Enterprises and Le Studio Canal+	N/A	$778,535
Over the Hill	New Line Home Video	June 30, 1992		N/A	
Fortress	Dimension Films (North America and Japan); Columbia TriStar Film Distributors International (International)	3 September 1993	co-production with Davis Entertainment	$12 million	$48 million
Lightning Jack	Savoy Pictures	March 11, 1994	co-production with Lightning Ridge Productions	N/A	$25 million
The Phantom	Paramount Pictures	June 7, 1996	co-production with The Ladd Company	$45 million	$23.5 million
Hotel de Love	LIVE Entertainment	September 12, 1996	co-production with Pratt Films	N/A	$747,372
Bullet	New Line Home Video	October 1, 1996	co-production with Clipsal Film Partnership	N/A	
Paradise Road	Fox Searchlight Pictures	April 11, 1997	co-production with YTC Pictures and Planet Pictures	$19 million	$4 million
Broken English	Sony Pictures Classics	May 2, 1997		N/A	$541,377
The Winner	LIVE Entertainment	July 25, 1997	co-production with Clipsal Film Partnership	N/A	
Critical Care	LIVE Entertainment	October 31, 1997	co-production with ASQA Film Partnership and Live Film and Mediaworks	$12 million	$271,000
Diana & Me	Hollywood Pictures Home Video	December 4, 1997		N/A	$205,783
Joey	Metro-Goldwyn-Mayer	December 26, 1997	co-production with Pratt Films	N/A	
Tarzan and the Lost City	Warner Bros.	April 24, 1998	co-production with Clipsal Film Partnership, Dieter Geissler Productions and Alta Vista Productions	$20 million	$2.2 million
Disturbing Behavior	Metro-Goldwyn-Mayer	July 24, 1998	international distribution only; produced by Metro-Goldwyn-Mayer and Beacon Communications	$15 million	$17.5 million
Practical Magic	Warner Bros.	October 16, 1998	co-production with Fortis Films and Di Novi Pictures	$75 million	$68.3 million
Occasional Coarse Language	Roadshow Film Distributors	November 25, 1998		$40,000	$909,475
Analyze This	Warner Bros.	March 5, 1999	co-production with NPV Entertainment, Baltimore Spring Creek Pictures, Face Productions and TriBeCa Productions	$30 million	$176.9 million
The Matrix	Warner Bros.	March 31, 1999	co-production with Silver Pictures and Groucho II Film Partnership	$63 million	$467.2 million
A Walk on the Moon	Miramax Films	April 2, 1999	co-production with Punch Productions and Groucho Film Partnership	$14 million	$4.7 million
Love Lies Bleeding	Warner Bros.	June 23, 1999		N/A	
Deep Blue Sea	Warner Bros.	July 28, 1999	co-production with Riche-Ludwig Productions and Groucho II Film Partnership	$60 million	$164.6 million
Three Kings	Warner Bros.	October 1, 1999	co-production with Village-A.M. Film Partnership, Coast Ridge Films and Atlas Entertainment	$48 million	$107.7 million
Three to Tango	Warner Bros.	October 22, 1999	co-production with Village-Hoyts Film Partnership and Outlaw Productions	$20 million	$10.6 million

==== 2000s ====
Title	Distributor	Release date	Notes	Budget	Box office
Eye of the Beholder	Destination Films	January 28, 2000	co-production with Ambridge Film Partnership, Behaviour Worldwide, Hit & Run Productions and Filmline International	$35 million	$17.6 million
Gossip	Warner Bros. Pictures	April 21, 2000	co-production with NPV Entertainment and Outlaw Productions	$24 million	$12 million
Space Cowboys	Warner Bros. Pictures	August 4, 2000	co-production with Clipsal Films, Mad Chance Productions and Malpaso Productions	$60–65 million	$128.9 million
Red Planet	Warner Bros. Pictures	November 10, 2000	co-production with NPV Entertainment and The Canton Company	$80 million	$33.5 million
Miss Congeniality	Warner Bros. Pictures	December 22, 2000	co-production with Fortis Films and Castle Rock Entertainment	$45 million	$212.7 million
Valentine	Warner Bros. Pictures	February 2, 2001	co-production with NPV Entertainment and Dylan Sellers Productions	$29 million	$36.7 million
Saving Silverman	Sony Pictures Releasing	February 9, 2001	co-production with Columbia Pictures, NPV Entertainment and Original Film	$22 million	$26 million
Down to Earth	Paramount Pictures	February 16, 2001	co-production with NPV Entertainment, 3 Arts Entertainment and Alphaville	$30 million	$71.2 million
See Spot Run	Warner Bros. Pictures	March 2, 2001	co-production with Robert Simonds Productions and NPV Entertainment	$16 million	$43 million
Exit Wounds	Warner Bros. Pictures	March 16, 2001	co-production with NPV Entertainment and Silver Pictures	$33 million	$80 million
Swordfish	Warner Bros. Pictures	June 8, 2001	co-production with NPV Entertainment, Silver Pictures and Jonathan D. Krane Productions	$102 million	$147.1 million
Cats & Dogs	Warner Bros. Pictures	July 4, 2001	co-production with NPV Entertainment, Mad Chance Productions, and Zide/Perry Productions	$60 million	$200.7 million
Don't Say a Word	20th Century Fox	September 28, 2001	co-production with NPV Entertainment, Regency Enterprises, Further Films, and Kopelson Entertainment	$50 million	$100 million
Zoolander	Paramount Pictures	September 28, 2001	co-production with VH1 Films, NPV Entertainment, Red Hour Films and Scott Rudin Productions	$28 million	$60.8 million
Hearts in Atlantis	Warner Bros. Pictures	September 28, 2001	co-production with NPV Entertainment and Castle Rock Entertainment	$31 million	$30.9 million
Training Day	Warner Bros. Pictures	October 5, 2001	co-production with NPV Entertainment and Outlaw Productions	$45 million	$104.9 million
Ocean's Eleven	Warner Bros. Pictures	December 7, 2001	co-production with Jerry Weintraub Productions, NPV Entertainment and Section Eight Productions	$85 million	$450.7 million
The Majestic	Warner Bros. Pictures	December 21, 2001	co-production with Castle Rock Entertainment, NPV Entertainment and Darkwoods Productions	$72 million	$37.3 million
Queen of the Damned	Warner Bros. Pictures	February 22, 2002	co-production with NPV Entertainment and Material Productions	$35 million	$45.4 million
Showtime	Warner Bros. Pictures	March 15, 2002	co-production with NPV Entertainment, Material Pictures and TriBeCa Productions	$85 million	$77.7 million
Eight Legged Freaks	Warner Bros. Pictures	July 17, 2002	co-production with NPV Entertainment and Electric Entertainment	$30 million	$45 million
The Adventures of Pluto Nash	Warner Bros. Pictures	August 16, 2002	co-production with Castle Rock Entertainment, NPV Entertainment and Bregman Productions	$100 million	$7.1 million
Ghost Ship	Warner Bros. Pictures	October 25, 2002	co-production with NPV Entertainment and Dark Castle Entertainment	$20 million	$68.3 million
Analyze That	Warner Bros. Pictures	December 6, 2002	co-production with NPV Entertainment, Baltimore Spring Creek Pictures, Face Productions and TriBeCa Productions	$60 million	$55 million
Two Weeks Notice	Warner Bros. Pictures	December 20, 2002	co-production with Castle Rock Entertainment, NPV Entertainment and Fortis Films	$60 million	$199 million
Dreamcatcher	Warner Bros. Pictures	March 21, 2003	co-production with Castle Rock Entertainment, NPV Entertainment, WV Films II and Kasdan Pictures	$68 million	$75.7 million
Fat Pizza	Roadshow Films	April 10, 2003		N/A	$2.1 million
The Matrix Reloaded	Warner Bros. Pictures	May 15, 2003	co-production with NPV Entertainment and Silver Pictures	$127–150 million	$741.8 million
Mystic River	Warner Bros. Pictures	October 15, 2003	co-production with Malpaso Productions and NPV Entertainment	$25–30 million	$156.6 million
The Matrix Revolutions	Warner Bros. Pictures	November 5, 2003	co-production with NPV Entertainment and Silver Pictures	$110–150 million	$427.3 million
Torque	Warner Bros. Pictures	January 16, 2004	co-production with Original Film	$40 million	$46.5 million
Taking Lives	Warner Bros. Pictures	March 19, 2004	co-production with Atmosphere Pictures	$45 million	$65.4 million
Catwoman	Warner Bros. Pictures	July 23, 2004	co-production with Di Novi Pictures, Frantic Films, Maple Shade Films and Catwoman Films	$100 million	$82.1 million
Ocean's Twelve	Warner Bros. Pictures	December 10, 2004	co-production with Jerry Weintraub Productions and Section Eight Productions	$110 million	$362.9 million
Constantine	Warner Bros. Pictures	February 18, 2005	co-production with Vertigo DC Comics, The Donners' Company, Weed Road Pictures and 3 Arts Entertainment	$70–100 million	$230.9 million
Miss Congeniality 2: Armed and Fabulous	Warner Bros. Pictures	March 24, 2005	co-production with Castle Rock Entertainment and Fortis Films	$45 million	$101.3 million
House of Wax	Warner Bros. Pictures	May 6, 2005	co-production with Dark Castle Entertainment	$40 million	$70.1 million
Charlie and the Chocolate Factory	Warner Bros. Pictures	July 15, 2005	co-production with Theobald Film Productions, The Zanuck Company and Plan B Entertainment	$150 million	$475 million
The Dukes of Hazzard	Warner Bros. Pictures	August 5, 2005	co-production with Gerber Pictures	$53 million	$109.8 million
Rumor Has It...	Warner Bros. Pictures	December 25, 2005	co-production with Section Eight Productions and Spring Creek Productions	$70 million	$88.9 million
Firewall	Warner Bros. Pictures	February 10, 2006	co-production with Beacon Pictures and Thunder Road Pictures	$50 million	$82.8 million
The Lake House	Warner Bros. Pictures	June 16, 2006	co-production with Vertigo Entertainment and Sidus Pictures	$40 million	$114.8 million
Happy Feet	Warner Bros. Pictures	November 17, 2006	co-production with Animal Logic, Kennedy Miller Productions and Kingdom Feature Productions	$100 million	$384.3 million
Unaccompanied Minors	Warner Bros. Pictures	December 8, 2006	co-production with The Donners' Company	$25 million	$21.9 million
Music and Lyrics	Warner Bros. Pictures	February 14, 2007	co-production with Reserve Room Productions and Castle Rock Entertainment	$40 million	$145.9 million
The Reaping	Warner Bros. Pictures	April 5, 2007	co-production with Dark Castle Entertainment	$40 million	$62.8 million
Lucky You	Warner Bros. Pictures	May 4, 2007	co-production with Deuce Three Productions, Flower Films and Di Novi Pictures	$55 million	$8.4 million
Ocean's Thirteen	Warner Bros. Pictures	June 8, 2007	co-production with Jerry Weintraub Productions and Section Eight Productions	$85 million	$311.7 million
License to Wed	Warner Bros. Pictures	July 3, 2007	co-production with Phoenix Pictures, Robert Simonds Productions, Underground Films and Management and Proposal Productions	$35 million	$70.2 million
No Reservations	Warner Bros. Pictures	July 27, 2007	co-production with Castle Rock Entertainment	$28 million	$92.6 million
The Invasion	Warner Bros. Pictures	August 17, 2007	co-production with Silver Pictures and Vertigo Entertainment	$65–80 million	$40.2 million
The Brave One	Warner Bros. Pictures	September 14, 2007	co-production with Silver Pictures	$70 million	$69 million
December Boys	Warner Independent Pictures	September 14, 2007	co-production with Becker Entertainment	$4 million	$1.2 million
Rogue	Dimension Films	November 8, 2007	co-production with Emu Creek Productions	$25 million	$4.6 million
I Am Legend	Warner Bros. Pictures	December 14, 2007	co-production with Weed Road Pictures, Overbrook Entertainment, Heyday Films and Original Film	$150 million	$585.4 million
Speed Racer	Warner Bros. Pictures	May 9, 2008	co-production with Silver Pictures and Anarchos Productions	$120 million	$93.9 million
Get Smart	Warner Bros. Pictures	June 20, 2008	co-production with Mosaic Media Group, Atlas Entertainment, Mad Chance Productions and Callahan Filmworks	$80 million	$230.7 million
Nights in Rodanthe	Warner Bros. Pictures	September 26, 2008	co-production with Di Novi Pictures	$30 million	$84.8 million
Gran Torino	Warner Bros. Pictures	December 12, 2008	co-production with Double Nickel Entertainment and Malpaso Productions	$25–33 million	$270 million
Yes Man	Warner Bros. Pictures	December 19, 2008	co-production with The Zanuck Company and Heyday Films	$70 million	$223.2 million
Where the Wild Things Are	Warner Bros. Pictures	October 16, 2009	co-production with Legendary Pictures, Playtone, Wild Things Productions, KLG Film Invest GmbH and The Worldwide Maurice International Company, Inc.	$100 million	$100.1 million
Sherlock Holmes	Warner Bros. Pictures	December 25, 2009	co-production with Silver Pictures and Wigram Productions	$90 million	$524 million

==== 2010s ====
Title	Distributor	Release date	Notes	Budget	Box office
Sex and the City 2	Warner Bros. Pictures	May 27, 2010	with New Line Cinema; co-production with HBO Films	$95 million	$294.7 million
Cats & Dogs: The Revenge of Kitty Galore	Warner Bros. Pictures	July 30, 2010	co-production with CD2 Pictures, Mad Chance Productions and Polymorphic Pictures	$85 million	$112.5 million
Legend of the Guardians: The Owls of Ga'Hoole	Warner Bros. Pictures	September 24, 2010	co-production with Animal Logic and GOG Productions	$80 million	$140.1 million
Life as We Know It	Warner Bros. Pictures	October 8, 2010	co-production with Gold Circle Films and Josephson Entertainment	$38 million	$105.71 million
Happy Feet Two	Warner Bros. Pictures	November 18, 2011	co-production with Dr. D Studios and Kennedy Miller Mitchell	$135 million	$150.4 million
Sherlock Holmes: A Game of Shadows	Warner Bros. Pictures	December 16, 2011	co-production with Silver Pictures and Wigram Productions	$125 million	$543.8 million
The Lucky One	Warner Bros. Pictures	April 10, 2012	co-production with Di Novi Pictures	$25 million	$99.4 million
Dark Shadows	Warner Bros. Pictures	May 11, 2012	co-production with Infinitum Nihil, GK Films and The Zanuck Company	$150 million	$245.5 million
Gangster Squad	Warner Bros. Pictures	January 11, 2013	co-production with Lin Pictures and Kevin McCormick Productions	$60–75 million	$105.2 million
Journey to the West	Huayi Brothers	February 10, 2013	as Village Roadshow Pictures Asia; co-production with Bingo Movie Development, Chinavision Media Group, Edko Films, China Film Group and Huayi Brothers	N/A	$215 million
101 Proposals	New Classics Media	February 12, 2013	as Village Roadshow Pictures Asia; co-production with Fuji Television Network, China Film Group and Asia Times Cultural Media	N/A	$31.2 million
The Great Gatsby	Warner Bros. Pictures	May 10, 2013	co-production with A&E Television, Bazmark Productions and Red Wagon Entertainment	$105 million	$353.6 million
Man of Tai Chi	RADiUS-TWC (North America); Universal Pictures (International)	November 1, 2013	as Village Roadshow Pictures Asia; co-production with China Film Group and Wanda Media	$25 million	$5.5 million
The Lego Movie	Warner Bros. Pictures	February 7, 2014	co-production with Warner Animation Group, RatPac-Dune Entertainment, Lego System A/S, Vertigo Entertainment and Lin Pictures	$60–65 million	$468.1 million
Winter's Tale	Warner Bros. Pictures	February 14, 2014	co-production with RatPac-Dune Entertainment, Weed Road Pictures and Marc Platt Productions	$75 million	$30.8 million
Edge of Tomorrow	Warner Bros. Pictures	June 6, 2014	co-production with RatPac-Dune Entertainment, 3 Arts Entertainment, Viz Productions and TC Productions	$178 million	$370.5 million
Into the Storm	Warner Bros. Pictures	August 8, 2014	with New Line Cinema, co-production with Broken Road Productions and RatPac-Dune Entertainment	$50 million	$161.7 million
The Equalizer	Sony Pictures Releasing	September 26, 2014	co-production with Columbia Pictures, LStar Capital, Escape Artists, Mace Neufeld Productions and Zhiv Productions	$55–73 million	$192.3 million
The Judge	Warner Bros. Pictures	October 10, 2014	co-production with RatPac-Dune Entertainment, Team Downey and Big Kid Pictures	$45–50 million	$84.4 million
Annie	Sony Pictures Releasing	December 19, 2014	co-production with Columbia Pictures, Overbrook Entertainment, Olive Bridge Entertainment and Marcy Media Films	$65–78 million	$133.8 million
American Sniper	Warner Bros. Pictures	December 25, 2014	co-production with RatPac-Dune Entertainment, Mad Chance Productions, 22nd & Indiana Pictures and Malpaso Productions	$59 million	$547.4 million
Jupiter Ascending	Warner Bros. Pictures	February 6, 2015	co-production with RatPac-Dune Entertainment and Anarchos Productions	$176–210 million	$183.9 million
Zhong Kui: Snow Girl and the Dark Crystal	Well Go USA Entertainment (United States); Desen International Media (China); Warner Bros. Pictures (Hong Kong)	February 19, 2015	as Village Roadshow Pictures Asia; co-production with Beijing Enlight Pictures, K. Pictures and Shenzhen Wus Entertainment	$30 million	$64.47 million
Mad Max: Fury Road	Warner Bros. Pictures	May 15, 2015	co-production with RatPac-Dune Entertainment and Kennedy Miller Mitchell	$154.6-185.1 million	$415.2 million
San Andreas	Warner Bros. Pictures	May 29, 2015	with New Line Cinema; co-production with RatPac-Dune Entertainment and Flynn Picture Company	$110 million	$474 million
Mountain Cry	Fortissimo Films	October 10, 2015	as Village Roadshow Pictures Asia; co-production with Beijing Hairun Pictures	N/A	
Goosebumps	Sony Pictures Releasing	October 16, 2015	co-production with Columbia Pictures, Sony Pictures Animation, LStar Capital, Original Film and Scholastic Entertainment	$58–84 million	$158.3 million
In the Heart of the Sea	Warner Bros. Pictures	December 11, 2015	co-production with Imagine Entertainment, RatPac-Dune Entertainment, Roth Films, COTT Productions, Enelmar Productions A.I.E., Spring Creek Pictures and Kia Jam	$100 million	$93.9 million
Concussion	Sony Pictures Releasing	December 25, 2015	co-production with Columbia Pictures, LStar Capital and Scott Free Productions	$35–57 million	$48.6 million
The Brothers Grimsby	Sony Pictures Releasing	March 11, 2016	co-production with Columbia Pictures. LStar Capital, Four by Two Films, Big Talk Productions and Working Title Films	$35 million	$28 million
The Legend of Tarzan	Warner Bros. Pictures	July 1, 2016	co-production with RatPac-Dune Entertainment, Jerry Weintraub Productions, Riche/Ludwig Productions and Beaglepug Films	$180 million	$356.7 million
Ghostbusters	Sony Pictures Releasing	July 15, 2016	co-production with Columbia Pictures, The Montecito Picture Company, Pascal Pictures, Feigco Entertainment and Ghost Corps	$144 million	$229.1 million
Sully	Warner Bros. Pictures	September 9, 2016	co-production with Flashlight Films, The Kennedy/Marshall Company, Malpaso Productions and Orange Corp.	$60 million	$240.8 million
The Magnificent Seven	Sony Pictures Releasing	September 23, 2016	co-production with Metro-Goldwyn-Mayer Pictures, Columbia Pictures, LStar Capital, Pin High Productions, Escape Artists and Fuqua Films	$90–107 million	$162.4 million
Hide and Seek	N/A	November 4, 2016	as Village Roadshow Pictures Asia; co-production with New Clues Films	N/A	
Collateral Beauty	Warner Bros. Pictures	December 16, 2016	co-production with New Line Cinema, RatPac-Dune Entertainment, Overbrook Entertainment, Anonymous Content, PalmStar Media and Likely Story	$36–40.3 million	$88.5 million
Passengers	Sony Pictures Releasing	December 21, 2016	co-production with Columbia Pictures, LStar Capital, Wanda Pictures, Original Film, Company Films and Start Motion Pictures	$110–150 million	$303.1 million
Fist Fight	Warner Bros. Pictures	February 17, 2017	co-production with New Line Cinema, 21 Laps Entertainment, Wrigley Pictures and RatPac-Dune Entertainment	$22–25 million	$41.1 million
Going in Style	Warner Bros. Pictures	April 7, 2017	co-production with New Line Cinema, RatPac-Dune Entertainment and De Line Pictures	$25 million	$84.9 million
King Arthur: Legend of the Sword	Warner Bros. Pictures	May 12, 2017	co-production with RatPac-Dune Entertainment, Weed Road Pictures, Safehouse Pictures and Ritchie/Wigram Productions	$175 million	$148.7 million
The House	Warner Bros. Pictures	June 30, 2017	co-production with New Line Cinema, Gary Sanchez Productions and Good Universe	$40 million	$34.2 million
Bleeding Steel	Lionsgate Films	December 22, 2017	as Village Roadshow Pictures Asia; co-production with Heyi Pictures and Perfect World Pictures	$65 million	$48.8 million
The 15:17 to Paris	Warner Bros. Pictures	February 9, 2018	co-production with Malpaso Productions	$30 million	$57.1 million
Ready Player One	Warner Bros. Pictures	March 29, 2018	co-production with Amblin Partners, Amblin Entertainment, De Line Pictures and Farah Films & Management	$155–175 million	$592.2 million
Ocean's 8	Warner Bros. Pictures	June 8, 2018	co-production with Smokehouse Pictures and Larger Than Life Productions	$70 million	$297.8 million
Joker	Warner Bros. Pictures	October 4, 2019	co-production with Bron Creative, Joint Effort, and DC Films	$55–70 million	$1.074 billion

==== 2020s ====
Title	Distributor	Release date	Notes	Budget	Box office
The Matrix Resurrections	Warner Bros. Pictures	December 22, 2021	co-production with Venus Castina Productions and Deutscher Filmförderfonds	$190 million	$159.2 million
Cinnamon	Tubi	June 23, 2023	co-production with Fox Entertainment Studios and Content Cartel Studios	N/A	
Murder City	Tubi	June 29, 2023	co-production with Fox Entertainment Studios and Content Cartel Studios	N/A	
Wonka	Warner Bros. Pictures	December 15, 2023	co-production with Heyday Films and The Roald Dahl Story Company	$125 million	$632.3 million
The Gutter	Magnolia Pictures	November 1, 2024	co-production with Destro Films and ModelBoyz Entertainment	N/A	$17,750

==== Upcoming ====
Title	Distributor	Release date	Notes
Eternal Return	Quiver Distribution (United States)	December 4, 2026	co-production with MACRO, BK Studios, Picture Films, New Name Entertainment, Gatherer Entertainment, Little Walnut and The Post Republic
Belly of the Beast	Lionsgate UK	TBA	co-production with Film4 and Chapel Place
Law Abiding Citizen 2	TBA	TBA	co-production with G-Base Productions, Rivulet Films, and Warp Films
Legacy	TBA	TBA	co-production with Phantom Four Films
The Girl Who Loved Tom Gordon	TBA	TBA	co-production with Sanibel Films, Origin Story, Stampede Ventures, and Vertigo Entertainment
Untitled Night of the Living Dead sequel	TBA	TBA	co-production with Sanibel Films, Origin Story, Vertigo Entertainment, and Westbrook Studios

=== Television series ===
Year	Series	Network	Notes	Seasons	Episodes
1993–1994	Paradise Beach	Nine Network	co-production with Genesis Entertainment	2	260
1995–1999	Flipper	Syndication/PAX	first three seasons only; co-production with Samuel Goldwyn Television, Tribune Entertainment and MGM Television	5	61
1995–1996	Space: Above and Beyond	Fox	co-production with Hard Eight Pictures and 20th Century Fox Television	1	23
1996–1997	Pacific Drive	Nine Network	co-production with New World Entertainment	2	390
1997–1998	Night Man	Syndication	season 1 only; co-production with ProSieben Media, Glen Larson Entertainment Network, Atlantis Films and Tribune Entertainment	1	22
1998–1999	Tales of the South Seas	Network Ten	co-production with CLT-UFA, Gaumont Télévision and South Pacific Pictures	1	22
1998–1999	Skippy: Adventures in Bushtown	Nine Network	co-production with Yoram Gross-Village Roadshow, International Tele Images and Videal	1	26
1998–1999	Dumb Bunnies	CBS	co-production with Yoram Gross-Village Roadshow, Nelvana and Scottish Television Enterprises	1	26

=== Television films ===
Title	Network	Release date	Notes
Trapped in Space	Sci-Fi Channel	October 19, 1994	co-production with CNM Entertainment and Wilshire Court Productions
Sahara	Showtime	April 25, 1995	co-production with TriStar Television
The Ticket	USA Network	August 6, 1997	co-production with CNM Entertainment and Wilshire Court Productions
Meteorites!	USA Network	June 3, 1998	co-production with Wilshire Court Productions
The Fury Within	USA Network	October 28, 1998	co-production with Wilshire Court Productions
Alien Cargo	UPN	January 28, 1999	co-production with Wilshire Court Productions
Sir Arthur Conan Doyle's The Lost World	TNT	April 3, 1999	pilot movie only; co-production with St. Clare Entertainment, Telescene and The Fremantle Corporation
Monster	UPN	November 12, 1999	co-production with Wilshire Court Productions
The Magicians	UPN	March 10, 2000	co-production with Wilshire Court Productions
Code 11-14	CBS	August 24, 2003	co-production with Wilshire Court Productions and Carlton America

=== Television miniseries ===
Title	Network	Release date	Notes	Episodes
The Thorn Birds: The Missing Years	CBS	February 11–13 1996	co-production with The Wolper Organization and Warner Bros. Television	2
20,000 Leagues Under the Sea	ABC	May 11–12, 1997	co-production with The Frederick S. Pierce Company	2
