= Quigley Down Under =

1990 western film by Simon Wincer

- Theatrical release poster by Steven Chorney
- Directed by: Simon Wincer
- Written by: John Hill
- Produced by: Stanley O'Toole; Alexandra Rose
- Starring: Tom Selleck; Laura San Giacomo; Alan Rickman
- Cinematography: David Eggby
- Edited by: Peter Burgess
- Music by: Basil Poledouris
- Production company: Pathé Entertainment
- Distributed by: Roadshow Entertainment (Australia); Metro-Goldwyn-Mayer (United States and United Kingdom)
- Release dates: 17 October 1990 (Los Angeles); 19 October 1990 (U.S.); 13 June 1991 (Australia)
- Running time: 119 minutes
- Countries: Australia; United States
- Language: English
- Budget: $18 million
- Box office: $21.4 million

Quigley Down Under is a 1990 Western film, directed by Simon Wincer and starring Tom Selleck, Alan Rickman, and Laura San Giacomo, and set in Australia. Although it opened to generally poor reviews, it has since developed an enduring niche following.

== Plot ==
Matthew Quigley is an American cowboy with a specially modified rifle with which he can shoot accurately at extraordinary distances. Seeing a newspaper advertisement that asks for a man with his special talent, he answers using just four words: "M. Quigley 900 yards", written on a copy of the advertisement that is punctured by six closely spaced bullet holes.

When he takes a boat from San Francisco and arrives in Australia, he gets into a fight with stockmen, who are also employees for the grazier who hired him and as they try to force "Crazy Cora" onto their wagon. After he identifies himself, he is taken to the station of Elliot Marston, who informs Quigley his sharpshooting skills will be used to eradicate the increasingly elusive Aboriginal Australians. Quigley turns down the offer and throws Marston out of his own house. When the Aboriginal manservant, Kunkurra, knocks Quigley over the head, Marston's men beat Cora and him unconscious and dump them in a desert in the Outback with no water and little chance of survival. However, Quigley manages to reclaim his rifle, killing 2 of Marston's men, but he and Cora spend a few days trekking the Outback and they are rescued by Aboriginal Australians.

Cora now reveals that she comes from Texas. When her home was attacked by Comanches, she hid in the root cellar and accidentally asphyxiated her child while trying to prevent him from crying. Her husband had then put her alone on a ship to Australia. Now Cora consistently calls Quigley by her husband's name (Roy), much to his annoyance.

When Marston's men attack the Aboriginal Australians who helped them, Quigley kills three. Escaping on a horse, they encounter more of the men driving Aboriginal Australians over a cliff. Quigley drives them off with his deadly shooting and Cora rescues an orphaned baby she finds among the dead below the cliff. Leaving Cora and the infant at a cave in the desert with food and water, Quigley rides alone to a nearby coastal town. There, he obtains new ammunition from a local German gunsmith, Grimmelman, who hates Marston for his murdering ways. Quigley learns also that he has become a legendary hero among the Aboriginal Australians.

Marston's men are also in town and recognize Quigley's saddle. When they attack, cornering him in a burning building, he escapes through a skylight and kills all but one of them. The injured survivor is sent back to say Quigley will be following, however, Grimmelmans wife is killed in the firefight. Quigley returns to Cora and the baby, which she has just saved from an attack by wild dingos. She had tried to stop that child from crying, too, but finally let him make as much noise as he liked, as she had killed the animals using a revolver that Quigley had left for her. Back in town, Cora gives the baby to Aboriginal Australians trading there after Quigley tells her that she (Cora) has a right to happiness.

The next morning, Quigley rides away to confront Marston at his station. At first, he shoots the defenders from his location in the hills, but is eventually shot in the leg and captured by Marston's last two men, his foreman, Dobkin, and a young stockman, O'Flynn. Marston, who has noticed that Quigley only ever carries a rifle, decides to give him a lesson in the "quick-draw" style of gun fighting. Marston and his men are beaten to the draw by Quigley; as Marston lies dying, Quigley refers to an earlier conversation, telling him, "I said I never had much use for one [a revolver]; never said I didn't know how to use it".

Kunkurra comes out of the house and gives Quigley his rifle back. The servant then walks away from the ranch, stripping off his western-style clothing as he goes, and some of the female servants follow in suit. A British colonial cavalry troop, led by Major Ashley-Pitt, now arrives to arrest Quigley, until they notice the surrounding hills are lined with Aboriginal Australians and decide to withdraw. Later, Quigley and Cora book a passage back to the United States in the name of Cora's husband, Roy Cobb, since Quigley is wanted. On the wharf, she reminds him that he once told her that she had to say two words before he could make love to her. Smiling broadly, she calls him "Matthew Quigley" and the two embrace.

== Cast ==
- Tom Selleck as Matthew Quigley, a Wyoming-based marksman and gunslinger hired to do a job in Australia
- Laura San Giacomo as Crazy Cora, an absent-minded prostitute from Texas currently residing in Australia
- Alan Rickman as Elliott Marston, a ruthless land baron determined to clear his land of Aborigines
- Chris Haywood as Major Ashley-Pitt, a British commanding officer in the region
- Ron Haddrick as Grimmelman, a German immigrant and craftsman residing in an Australian coastal town
- Tony Bonner as Dobkin, Marston's foreman
- Jerome Ehlers as Coogan
- Conor McDermottroe as Hobb
- Roger Ward as Brophy
- Ben Mendelsohn as O'Flynn, a young and reckless enforcer in Marston's employment
- Steve Dodd as Kunkurra, Marston's aborigine manservant
- Karen Davitt as Slattern
- Kylie Foster as Slattern
- William Zappa as Reilly
- Jonathan Sweet as Sergeant Thomas
- Ollie Hall as Carver
- Michael Carman as deserter
- Vic Gordon as Elderly Man
- Danny Adcock as Mitchell

== Production ==
=== Development ===
John Hill first began writing Quigley Down Under in 1974. He was inspired by a Los Angeles Times article about the genocide of Aboriginal Australians and Torres Strait Islanders in 19th-century Australia. Although Westerns were in decline in the 1970s, Hill said that the script "opened a lot of doors for me," and led to other assignments.

The script was first optioned in 1979 by producer Mort Engelberg for Steve McQueen, with whom he teamed on The Hunter; however, McQueen died of cancer shortly after completing The Hunter. The script was bought by CBS Theatrical Films, where it was attached to director Rick Rosenthal. It then went to Warner Bros. with Tom Selleck to star and Lewis Gilbert to direct around 1987. Warner Bros. had the script for three years, but then dropped their option. The script then became the subject of bidding between Pathé Entertainment, Disney, and Warner Bros. It sold to Pathé for $250,000, which Hill said, "is pretty good, when you consider that for 15 years, I'd been making money optioning and rewriting that screenplay."

Pathé's then-head of production, Alan Ladd Jr., agreed to commit to a $20 million budget. Selleck agreed to star, and the director was an Australian, Simon Wincer. Wincer, who was feeling a good story had been ruined by numerous rewrites from people who knew little about Australian history, brought in Ian Jones as writer. They went back to the original draft, reset it from the 1880s to the 1860s, and made it more historically accurate.

=== Shooting ===
The film was shot entirely in Australia. Scenes were filmed at 51 locations across Australian Northern Territory, including a $1-million-dollar 19th-century-replica "Marston Station" ranch. The port of Fremantle, Australia, was portrayed by Warrnambool, Victoria, Australia. The firearm used by Quigley (Selleck) is a custom 13.5 pound (6 kg), single-shot, 1874 Sharps rifle, with a 34-inch (860 mm) barrel. A replica was manufactured for the film by the Shiloh Rifle Manufacturing Company of Big Timber, Montana. In 2002, Selleck donated the rifle, along with six other firearms from his other films, to the "Real Guns of Reel Heroes" exhibit at the National Firearms Museum in Fairfax, Virginia.

Although several scenes of the story depict violence and cruelty toward and involving animals, a film spokesperson explained that no animal was harmed, and special effects were used. For example, Quigley and Cora are reduced to consuming "grub worms" (actually blobs of dough) for survival. A pack of dingoes attacks Cora, and she finally saves herself by shooting the animals. Those animals were specially trained, and were actually "playing" for that scene, which was later enhanced by visual and sound effects. Several scenes involve falling horses; they were performed by specially trained animals and were not hurt. When a horse falls off a cliff, the "horse" was a mechanical creation. The film's producer stated that a veterinarian was on the set whenever animals were being used in filming.

== Reception ==
The film was neither a box-office hit nor blessed with critical acclaim (except praise for Rickman's portrayal of villainy).

=== General reception ===
A mere "formula" Western in the eyes of many reviewers, Quigley had the misfortune of opening almost simultaneously with Dances With Wolves, which swept the Motion Picture Academy Awards that year.

In comparison, critical responses to Quigley were mixed, at best, and it has only a 52% rating on Rotten Tomatoes from 21 reviews. Metacritic, which uses a weighted average, assigned the film a score of 51 out of 100, based on 12 critics, indicating "mixed or average" reviews. Roger Ebert of the Chicago Sun-Times gave the film two-and-a-half out of four stars, writing that it was a well-made but formulaic neo-western. He particularly praised the performances of Rickman and San Giacomo, saying "[T]his may be the movie that proves her staying power." The film was millions of dollars from recouping its costs in early 1991.

The New York Times panned it almost completely, describing the film as a "formula Western at its most pokey," and though praising villain Rickman as "an effortless scene-stealer", disparaged Selleck and San Giacomo's performances. Conversely, Variety summed it up as "an exquisitely crafted, rousing Western" and praised the performances of all three leading characters.

=== Niche interest ===
Despite its initial weak general reception, Quigley became a perennial cable-TV rerun, and acquired a following among Western film enthusiasts, Australians, and gun enthusiasts. The protagonist's skill with his rifle has led snipers to refer to the act of killing two targets with a single bullet as "a Quigley", a feat so named, too, in the Halo series of video games. Annually, Forsyth, Montana, renames itself "Quigleyville" in June, drawing hundreds of top long-range shooters from around the world for its "Matthew Quigley Buffalo Rifle Match".

=== Awards and nominations ===
Award	Category	Subject	Result
London Film Critics' Circle Award	British Actor of the Year	Alan Rickman	Won
Motion Picture Sound Editors Award	Best Sound Editing – Foreign Feature	Tim Chau	Won
Motion Picture Sound Editors Award	Best Sound Editing – Foreign Feature	Frank Lipson	Won
Political Film Society Award	Human Rights		Nominated

== See also ==
- Cinema of Australia
