= Brian Moll =

Australian charactor actor (1925–2013)

- Brian Moll in TV series The Young Doctors
- Born: Brian Percy Moll; 19 May 1925; Wanstead, London, England
- Died: 9 August 2013 (aged 88); Sippy Downs, Queensland, Australia
- Occupations: Actor; comedian
- Years active: 1945–1994 (retired)
- Known for: The Young Doctors (TV series) as Dr Vincent Snape; A Country Practice (TV series) as Alfred Muldoon

Brian Percy Moll (19 May 1925 – 9 August 2013) was a British-born Australian comedian character actor of stage, television and film and director and producer. He was best known for his soap opera television roles, but also appeared in film and numerous theatre productions, over a 50 year career. Moll started his career in his native England in theatre in 1945.

Although he primarily appeared in small parts, he did have more regular roles in TV series including The Young Doctors as Dr. Vincent Snape from 1976 and 1978 and a recurring role in A Country Practice from 1982 and 1992 as corrupt town Councillor Alfred Muldoon

== Early life ==
Moll was born on Chaucer Road in Wanstead, North East London on 19 May 1925, to Hedges Percy Moll and Dorothy 'Dot' Alice Sarah Moll (née Mitchell). He had a brother Peter James Moll.

During World War II, Moll was conscripted to the Royal Navy in 1943 at the age of eighteen and spent the later years of the war serving on a minesweeper. His ship was involved in the D-Day operation and he watched the action from just off the Arromanches beach.

In October 1950, Moll immigrated from England and arrived in Melbourne, Australia under the £10 assisted passage emigration scheme. Quitting his job as a publicity officer, to continued his acting career. In December 1975, he took Australian citizenship.

== Career ==
=== Theatre ===
Moll began his stage career taking on leading parts with the Melbourne Little Theatre from 1951. As well as acting, he was producing and directing difficult plays by playwrights including Chekov and Ibsen. In 1963, he moved to Brisbane and joined the Queensland Arts Theatre. He continued his acting career in his spare time. In the 1960s he was campaigning in Brisbane for a new permanent arts centre and was involved in plans which resulted in the Queensland Performing Arts Complex being built.

In 1970 he appeared in It's a Rum Do in the role of Samuel Marsden, the priest who was partly responsible for bringing merino sheep to Australia, which started the wool industry. The play was chosen to be given a Royal Command Performance in the Brisbane Arts Centre. He was presented to the Queen and he told her that over the past two years he had played eight priests. She asked him why, and smiled when he answered "It was my purity of spirit and a bald head". Following this, his acting career took off.

=== Television and film ===
Moll made his television debut in 1958. He was known for his villainous roles, once remarking that this was due to his bald head (he had been completely bald since the age of 25). As a working actor, like many of the era, he had numerous character roles on the Crawford Productions TV serials including Matlock Police, Homicide and Division 4, as well as many guest roles on other television series, miniseries, telemovies and films. Some of these included Bellbird, The Sullivans, and Cop Shop.

In 1975, he became better known however for playing the recurring role of slimy town clerk Eddie Buchanan in soap opera Number 96, Dr. Vincent Snape in The Young Doctors from 1977 to 1978, and briefly as Mr. Spencer in Prisoner in 1980.

He was most likely however best known for his long running itinerant role in serial A Country Practice, as devious and pompous town councillor Alfred Muldoon – a role he played from 1982 to 1992, through 120 episodes. He commuted interstate from the north Queensland coast to Sydney, while working on the series.

In 1990, he appeared as Mr. Gordian in action drama film Bloodmoon, which was filmed in Brisbane. He also had a small cameo role in the martial arts action film Street Fighter in 1994, alongside Jean-Claude Van Damme.

== Later years and death ==
When he realised acting work was no longer providing him a sufficient income, Moll moved to the north coast of Queensland in the late 1980s to ease the financial burden, commuting to Sydney for work. To supplement his income, he relied on his war pension.

Moll retired in 1994 and resided in Sippy Downs, Queensland in a nursing home, where he died on 9 August 2013, aged 88. His ashes were scattered near his home on the Sunshine Coast.

He was honoured in the 'In Memoriam' segment of the 3rd AACTA Awards, for his "contribution to Australian screen culture".

== Filmography ==
=== Film ===
Year	Title	Role	Type
1971	Exit	Geeles	Short film
1971	Stork	Priest	Feature film
1973	Alvin Purple	Clerk of the Court	Feature film
1975	That Lady from Peking	Father Leonard	Feature film
1976	Water Management	Water Man	Short film
1981	Maybe This Time	Older Salesman	Feature film
1984	Fantasy Man	Lofty	Feature film
1990	Bloodmoon	Mr. Gordian	Feature film
1990	Dead Sleep	Dr. Shamberg	Feature film
1992	Something Wicked	Lecturer	Short film
1994	Street Fighter	Bison's Scientist	Feature film

=== Television ===
Year	Title	Role	Type
1958	Captain Carvallo		TV movie
1958	Killer in Close-Up		Episode: "The Rattenbury Case"
1959	Press Gang		TV movie
1968; 1969	Hunter	Hinksman / Fishta	2 episodes
1969	The Party	Martin Luther	TV movie
1971–1973	Matlock Police	Forbes / Tojo / Brown / School Principal / Ray Smith / Gaye / Fred Jackson	7 episodes
1969	The Rovers	Dr. Wright	1 episode
1973	Boney	Bill Bulford	1 episode
1973	Ryan	Warburton / Topley	2 episodes
1968–1974	Homicide	Frank Adams / Ted Sands / John Lee / Richard Evans / Clerk / Stan Preston / Gustav / Arthur Reid / Phillips / Grant / Hotel Manager	11 episodes
1969–1974	Division 4	Jack Doyle / Eddie Bailey / Herbie Pike / Wilson Snr / Ralph Morris	10 episodes
1974	Silent Number	Prison Doctor	1 episode
1975	The Unisexers	Mr Lewis	
1975	Number 96	TC Eddie Buchanan	10 episodes
1975	King's Men	Drake	1 episode
1975	Luke's Kingdom	Settler	1 episode
1976	McManus MPB	Carl Day	TV movie
1976	Rush	Thomas	2 episodes
1977	The Outsiders	Mertz	1 episode
1977–1979	The Young Doctors	Dr. Vincent Snape	Regular role
1978	Case for the Defence	The Judge	1 episode
1980	Arcade	Mr. Sponge	
1980	Prisoner	Mr. Spenser	3 episodes
1980	Cop Shop	Sammy Smith	1 episode
1980	The Timeless Land	Rev Johnson	Miniseries, 3 episodes
1982–1992	A Country Practice	Alfred Muldoon	120 episodes
1981	Bellamy	Wilkes	1 episode
1984	The Cowra Breakout	Doctor	Miniseries
1984	Special Squad	Charlie Everett	Episode 14: "Slow Attack"
1984	Queen of the Road	Al 'Herpie' Graves	TV movie
1985	Hector's Bunyip	Ernest Slater	TV movie
1987	Great Expectations: The Untold Story	Uncle Pumblechook	TV movie
1987	The Petrov Affair	Billy Wentworth	Miniseries, 2 episodes

== Theatre ==
=== As performer ===
Year	Title	Role	Type	Ref.
1951	Doctor's Joy	Professor Purge	Melbourne Little Theatre	
1951	Shipwreck	Heynorick	Melbourne Little Theatre	
1951	Larger Than Life	Butler	Melbourne Little Theatre	
1952	The Happiest Days of Your Life	Headmaster	Arrow Theatre, Melbourne	
1953	The Critic	Mr Sneer	Arrow Theatre, Melbourne	
1953	The Flashing Stream	Rear-Admiral Sir George Helston	Melbourne Little Theatre	
1956	As Long As They're Happy	The Father	Melbourne Little Theatre	
1957	Little by Little		Melbourne Little Theatre	
1959	An Italian Straw Hat		Melbourne Little Theatre	
1960	The Long and the Short and the Tall		Melbourne Little Theatre	
1961	Anastasia	Boris Chernov	Albert Hall, Brisbane with Brisbane Repertory Theatre	
1962	Twelfth Night	Sir Andrew Aguecheek	Caboolture	
1963	The Caretaker	Davies	Brisbane Arts Theatre	
1965	Luther	Luther	Brisbane Arts Theatre	
1968	The Judge	Dr Waggon	St Martins Theatre, Melbourne	
1968	The Living Room	Father James Browne	St Martins Theatre, Melbourne	
1969	Hadrian VII	Cardinal Berstein	Her Majesty's Theatre, Melbourne with J. C. Williamson's	
1970	A Rum Do!	The Rev. Samuel Marsden	SGIO Theatre, Brisbane with QTC (Royal Performance)	
1970	Philadelphia, Here I Come!		Australian tour with QTC	
1972	Richard II	Sir John Bushy / Head Gardener	Theatre Royal, Hobart	
1975	Semi-Detached		Marian St Theatre, Sydney	
1975	The Touch of Silk		Independent Theatre, Sydney	
1980	Shut Your Eyes and Think of England	Mr Rubinstein	Her Majesty's Theatre, Brisbane, Comedy Theatre, Melbourne	
1991	The Cherry Orchard	Faers	Suncorp Theatre, Brisbane with QTC	
1991	The Crucible		Suncorp Theatre, Brisbane with QTC	
1992	The Marriage of Figaro	Antonio	Suncorp Theatre, Brisbane with QTC	

=== As crew ===
Year	Title	Role	Type	Ref.
1961	The Multi-Coloured Umbrella	Designer	Brisbane Arts Theatre	
1964	Summer Solstice	Producer	Brisbane Arts Theatre	
1965	Private Ear & Public Eye	Director	Brisbane Arts Theatre	
1967	Breakfast with Julia	Director	Brisbane Arts Theatre	
1971	Crackers	Producer	St Martins Theatre, Melbourne	
