= Footballer Wants a Wife =

2015 comedy television miniseries

- Genre: Television comedy
- Created by: Ben Nicholas
- Written by: Ben Nicholas; Carl J Sorheim
- Directed by: Jovita O'Shaughnessy
- Starring: Ben Nicholas; Brooke Satchwell; Cassandra Magrath
- Composer: Dmitri Golovko
- Country of origin: Australia
- Original language: English
- No. of seasons: 1
- No. of episodes: 6

Production
- Production location: Docklands Studios Melbourne
- Cinematography: Jaque Fisher
- Editor: Marc Arena
- Running time: 8 minutes
- Production company: Crankyfish

Original release
- Release: 9 September – 9 September 2015

Footballer Wants a Wife is a six-part comedy web miniseries which parodies reality TV dating shows and sends up footballer stereotypes.

== Production ==
The series was created by Ben Nicholas. It was funded through Screen Australia's Multi Platform drama funding program. The series aired in September 2015. It was produced by Julian Vincent Costanzo and Jonathon Dutton, and written by Nicholas and Carl J Sorheim. The series features an all-star cast.

Nicholas did not want to "tarnish" the AFL or those involved in it, but rather poke fun at reality television. He stated "I'm a big fan of football and I didn't want to tarnish the game. I don't want to go down any of the routes that mar the game. People don't need to know about drug scandals or in-jokes or bad boys."

== Synopsis ==
Steven is a football player looking for a wife – just like his mother. He joins two other young footballers as they embark on their modern-day journey to find true love. The three footballers (from three different codes), are matched up against fourteen women who will stop at nothing to become a WAG.

== Cast ==
- Ben Nicholas as Steven Papakonstantinou
- Brooke Satchwell as Sally Brightmore
- Martin Copping as Camden
- Jonathon Buckley as Dustin Cox
- Stefan Dennis as The Voice
- Maya Aleksandra as Veronika
- Ella Cannon as Lucy
- Ra Chapman as Hope
- Maria Angelico as Jade
- Cassandra Magrath as Jackie / Substitute
- Elise Jansen as Kayla
- Georgia Chara as Bella
- Melissa Howard as Coreen
- Maria Mercedes as Mama
- Mahalia Brown as Peggy
- Stephanie Lillis as Jones
- James Mason as Nigel West
- Nikki Osborne as Substitute
- Sarah Roberts as Becky
- Warwick Capper as Self

== Episodes ==
1. Meet the Team
2. Pack Date
3. Makeovers
4. Slave to Love
5. Meet My Family
6. Grand Finale
