= Franklin J. Schaffner =

American director (1920–1989)

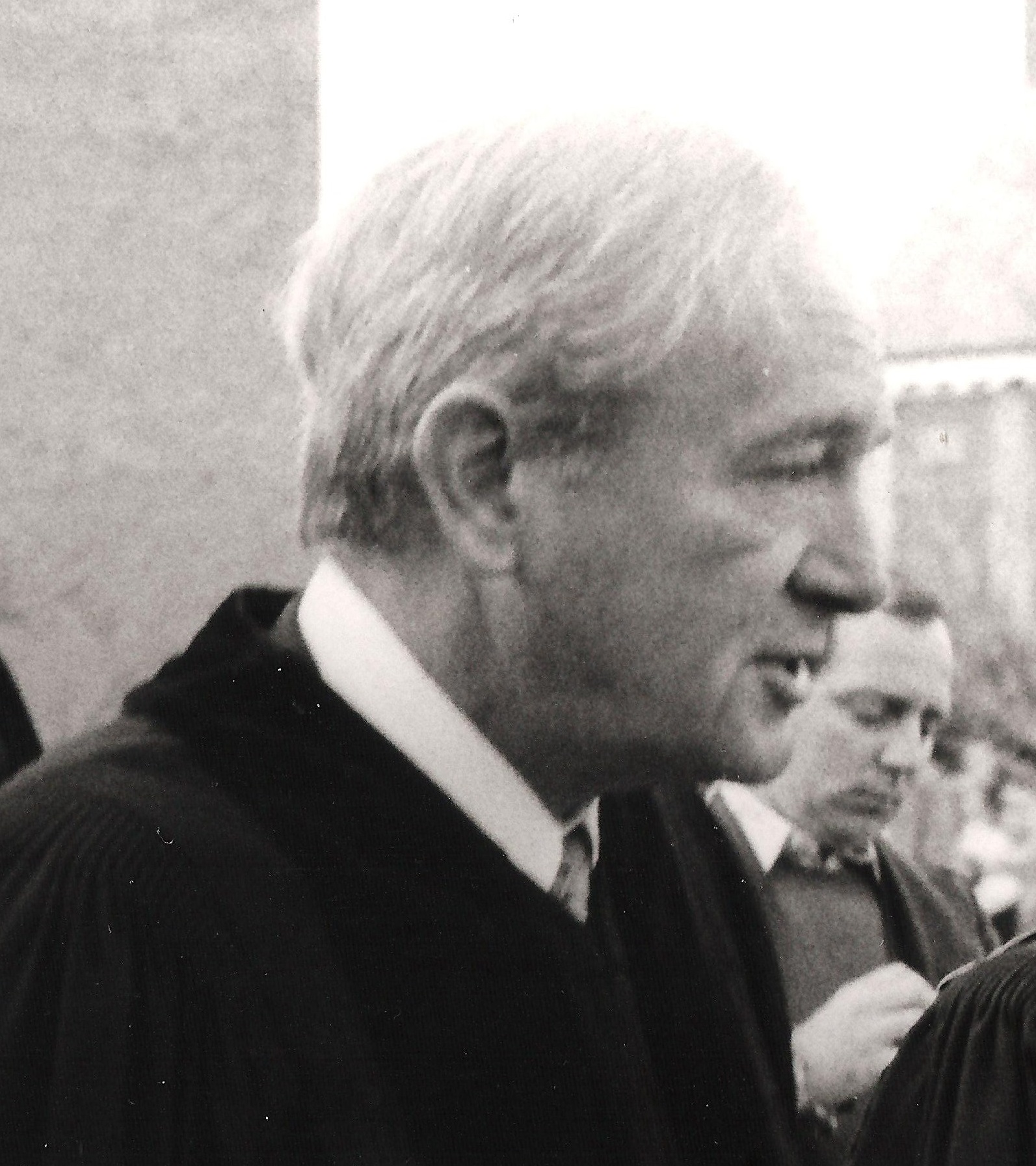
- Schaffner in 1977
- Born: Franklin James Schaffner; May 30, 1920; Tokyo, Japan
- Died: July 2, 1989 (aged 69); Santa Monica, California, U.S.
- Education: Franklin & Marshall College Columbia University Law School
- Occupation: Director
- Title: President of the Directors Guild of America, 1987–89
- Spouse: Helen Jean Gilchrist (1948–89) (died 2007)
- Awards: Academy Award for Best Director; 1971 Patton; Primetime Emmy Award for Best Direction; 1955 Studio One, 1955 Ford Star Jubilee, 1962 The Defenders
- Military career
- Allegiance: United States
- Branch: United States Navy; Office of Strategic Services
- Rank: Lieutenant

Franklin James Schaffner (May 30, 1920 – July 2, 1989) was an American film, television, and stage director. He won the Academy Award for Best Director for Patton (1970), and is known for the films Planet of the Apes (1968), Nicholas and Alexandra (1971), Papillon (1973), and The Boys from Brazil (1978). He served as president of the Directors Guild of America between 1987 and 1989.

== Early life ==
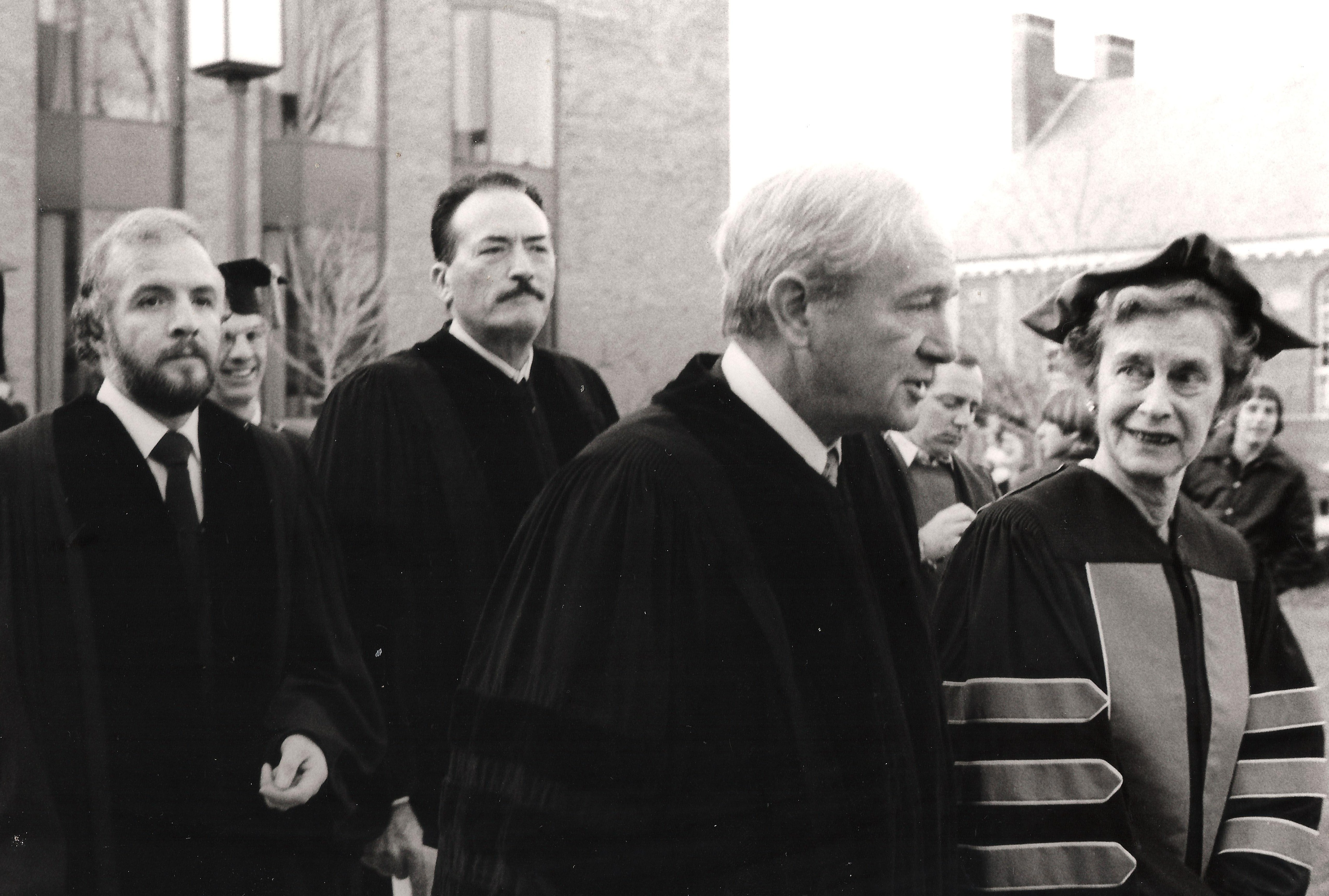
(from far left) Stanley O'Toole, Gregory Peck and Franklin J. Schaffner outside Franklin & Marshall College after accepting an honorary degree in 1977

Schaffner was born in Tokyo, Japan, the son of American missionaries Sarah Horting (née Swords) and Paul Franklin Schaffner, and was raised in Japan.

The Schaffners returned to the United States and settled in Lancaster, Pennsylvania when Franklin Schaffner was 5 years old. Franklin Schaffner attended J.P. McCaskey High School, where he appeared as Mr. Darcy in the school's production of Pride and Prejudice. In 1938, he graduated as valedictorian of McCaskey High School's first graduating class.

Schaffner graduated from Franklin & Marshall College (F&M) in Lancaster. As a student, Schaffner was active in the drama program at F&M's Green Room Theatre, where he appeared in eleven plays and served as president of the Green Room Club. He then studied law at Columbia University in New York City, but his education was interrupted by service with the U.S. Navy in World War II during which he served with amphibious forces in Europe and North Africa. In the latter stages of the war, he was sent to the Pacific Far East to serve with the Office of Strategic Services.

== Television career ==
Schaffner returned to the United States after the war. He worked for a world peace organization, then as an assistant director for the documentary film series The March of Time. He became a director in the news and public affairs department of CBS television, where his jobs including covering sports, beauty pageants and public-service programs.

In 1950 he directed "The Traitor", the first episode of Ford Theatre. He also did adaptations of Alice in Wonderland and Treasure Island.

He directed "Thunder on Sycamore Street" by Reginald Rose for Studio One. He and Rose reunited on Twelve Angry Men which won Schaffner an Emmy for Best Director.

The following year Schaffner earned another Emmy for his work on the 1955 TV adaptation of the Broadway play The Caine Mutiny Court-Martial, shown on the anthology series Ford Star Jubilee.

Schaffner became one of three regular directors on The Kaiser Aluminum Hour; the others were George Roy Hill and Fielder Cook. He was also a regular director on Playhouse 90.

He was the original director on the series, The Defenders, created by Rose. Schaffner's work earned him another Emmy.

In 1960, he directed Allen Drury's stage play Advise and Consent. This earned him the Best Director recognition in the Variety Critics Poll.

In the realm of network television, Schaffner also received widespread critical acclaim in 1962 for his groundbreaking collaboration with the First Lady of the United States Jacqueline Kennedy and CBS television's Musical Director Alfredo Antonini in the production of A Tour of the White House with Mrs. John F. Kennedy, a television special broadcast to over 80 million viewers worldwide.

Schaffner's contributions in this production earned him a nomination in 1963 by the Directors Guild of America, for its award in the category of Outstanding Directorial Achievement in Television.

== Feature films ==
=== Early films ===
In January 1960 Schaffner signed a multi picture deal with Columbia Pictures.

In May 1961 he signed to make A Summer Place at 20th Century Fox with Fabian and Dolores Hart. The film was not made. Schaffner directed The Good Years (1962) for TV with Henry Fonda and Lucille Ball. Other TV work included The Great American Robbery.

Instead Schaffner's first motion picture was The Stripper (1963), made at Fox from a play by William Inge, starring Richard Beymer and Joanne Woodward. The film was well-received critically, but not a commercial success.

He continued to work for TV including The Legend of Lylah Clare.

Schaffner later made The Best Man (1964) based on a play by Gore Vidal and The War Lord (1965), based on a play by Leslie Stevens, with Charlton Heston. In a 1966 interview he said "as you mature you learn that the story is the most important thing." He announced various films for Columbia – The Day Lincoln Was Shot, The Whistle Blows for Victory and The Green Beret – but they were not made.

He went to Britain to make The Double Man (1967) with Yul Brynner, a film Schaffner admitted he did for the money.

=== Peak ===
Schaffner had a huge critical and commercial hit in Planet of the Apes (1968) starring Heston at 20th Century Fox.

In December 1968 Schaffner signed a non-exclusive three-picture deal with Columbia.

His next film was for 20th Century Fox, however: Patton (1970), a biopic of General Patton starring George C. Scott. It was a major success for which Schaffner won the Academy Award for Best Director and the Directors Guild of America Award for Best Director.

He made Nicholas and Alexandra (1971) for producer Sam Spiegel, based on the book of the same name by Robert K. Massie. It was an expensive box-office failure. Schaffner followed it with Papillon (1973) a $14 million epic with Steve McQueen and Dustin Hoffman that was a considerable financial success. In 1971 he said his films "are almost always about people who are out of their time and place."

Schaffner intended to follow Papillon with Dynasty of Western Outlaws, about outlaws over the years in Missouri from a script by John Gay, and an adaptation of The French Lieutenant's Woman. He ended up making neither: Dynasty was never made, and French Lieutenant was made a decade later by another director.

Schaffner reunited with George C. Scott in Islands in the Stream (1977), based on the novel by Ernest Hemingway. He then did The Boys from Brazil (1978) based on a novel by Ira Levin with Gregory Peck and Laurence Olivier.

=== Later work ===
His later films included Sphinx (1981), a $10 million thriller about Egypt based on a novel by Robin Cook and produced by Stanley O'Toole, who had made Boys from Brazil with Schaffner. It was a commercial and critical failure, as was Yes, Giorgio (1982), a musical comedy starring Luciano Pavarotti.

Schaffner's last films were the critically well-received Lionheart (1987) and Welcome Home (1989).

Schaffner was president of the Directors Guild of America from 1987 until his death in 1989.

== Frequent collaborators ==
Jerry Goldsmith composed the music for seven of his films: The Stripper, Planet of the Apes, Patton, Papillon, Islands in the Stream, The Boys from Brazil and Lionheart. Four of them were nominated for the Academy Award for Best Original Score.

Schaffner twice worked with actors Charlton Heston and Maurice Evans (The War Lord; Planet of the Apes), George C. Scott (Patton; Islands in the Stream) and Laurence Olivier (Nicholas and Alexandra; The Boys from Brazil).

== Personal life ==
Schaffner married Helen Jean Gilchrist in 1948. The couple had two children, Jennie and Kate. She died in 2007.

Schaffner died on July 2, 1989, at the age of 69. He was released 10 days before his death from a hospital where he was being treated for lung cancer.

== Critical perception ==
Screenwriter William Goldman identified Schaffner in 1981 as being one of the three best directors (then living) at handling "scope" (a gift for screen epics) in films. The other two were David Lean and Richard Attenborough.

== Legacy ==
In 1991, Schaffner's widow, Jean Schaffner, established the Franklin J. Schaffner Alumni Medal (colloquially known as the Franklin J. Schaffner Award), which is awarded by the American Film Institute at its annual ceremony to an alumnus of either the AFI Conservatory or the AFI Conservatory Directing Workshop for Women who best embodies the qualities of the late director: talent, taste, dedication and commitment to quality filmmaking. Notable recipients include David Lynch, Amy Heckerling, Terrence Malick, Darren Aronofsky, Patty Jenkins and Paul Schrader, among others.

The Directors Guild of America also began presenting a Franklin J. Schaffner Achievement Award to associate directors or stage managers in 1991.

The moving image collection of Franklin J. Schaffner is held at the Academy Film Archive.

In May 2020, the mayor of Lancaster, Pennsylvania, proclaimed Franklin Schaffner Week (May 23–30, 2020) to mark the centennial of his birth.

== Filmography ==
=== Film ===
Year	Title	Director	Producer
1952	The Wings of the Dove	Yes	No
1963	The Stripper	Yes	No
1964	The Best Man	Yes	No
1965	The War Lord	Yes	No
1967	The Double Man	Yes	No
1968	Planet of the Apes	Yes	No
1970	Patton	Yes	Yes
1971	Nicholas and Alexandra	Yes	No
1973	Papillon	Yes	Yes
1977	Islands in the Stream	Yes	No
1978	The Boys from Brazil	Yes	No
1981	Sphinx	Yes	Executive
1982	Yes, Giorgio	Yes	No
1987	Lionheart	Yes	No
1989	Welcome Home	Yes	No

=== Television ===
Year	Title	Notes
1948–51	The Ford Theatre Hour	22 episodes
1949	Wesley	13 episodes
1949–56	Studio One	110 episodes
1951	Tales of Tomorrow	5 episodes
1953–59	Person to Person	248 episodes
1955	The Best of Broadway	1 episode
1955–56	Ford Star Jubilee	2 episodes
1956–57	The Kaiser Aluminum Hour	6 episodes
1957	Producers' Showcase	1 episode
1957–60	Playhouse 90	19 episodes
1959	Startime	1 episode
1961–62	The Defenders	6 episodes
1962	A Tour of the White House with Mrs. John F. Kennedy	Documentary special
1962–64	The DuPont Show of the Week	10 episodes
1967	ABC Stage 67	1 episode

TV movies

- Cry Vengeance! (1961)
- The Good Years (1962)
- Ambassador at Large (1964)
- One-Eyed Jacks Are Wild (1966)

== Awards and nominations ==
=== Film ===
Year	Title	Academy Awards		Golden Globe Awards		BAFTA Awards	
Year	Title	Nominations	Wins	Nominations	Wins	Nominations	Wins
1963	The Stripper	1					
1964	The Best Man	1		2			
1968	Planet of the Apes	2	1				
1970	Patton	10	7	2	1	2	
1971	Nicholas and Alexandra	6	2	3		3	
1973	Papillon	1		1			
1976	Islands in the Stream	1					
1978	The Boys from Brazil	3		1			
1982	Yes, Giorgio	1		1			
Total		26	10	10	1	5	

Year	Award/Association	Category	Work	Result
1964	Karlovy Vary International Film Festival	Crystal Globe	The Best Man	Nominated
1964	Karlovy Vary International Film Festival	Special Jury Prize	The Best Man	Won
1971	Academy Awards	Best Director	Patton	Won
1971	Golden Globe Awards	Best Director	Patton	Nominated
1971	Directors Guild of America Award	Directorial Achievement in Motion Pictures	Patton	Won
1979	Saturn Awards	Best Director	The Boys from Brazil	Nominated
2008	Jules Verne Award	Légendaire Award	Planet of the Apes	Won

=== Television ===
Year	Title	Emmy Awards		Golden Globe Awards	
Year	Title	Nominations	Wins	Nominations	Wins
1949–56	Studio One	12	5		
1953–59	Person to Person	6			
1955	The Best of Broadway	1			
1955–56	Ford Star Jubilee	4	3		
1956–57	The Kaiser Aluminum Hour	1			
1957	Producers' Showcase	13	7		
1957–60	Playhouse 90	34	13		1
1959	Startime	5	1		
1961–62	The Defenders	8	14	2	1
1962–64	The DuPont Show of the Week	8			
1967	ABC Stage 67	4	2		
Total		96	45	2	2

Year	Award/Association	Category	Work	Episode	Result
1955	Primetime Emmy Award	Best Direction	Studio One	"Twelve Angry Men"	Won
1956	Primetime Emmy Award	Best Direction	Ford Star Jubilee	"The Caine Mutiny Court-Martial"	Won
1956	Primetime Emmy Award	Best Television Adaptation	Ford Star Jubilee	"The Caine Mutiny Court-Martial"	Won
1961	Directors Guild of America Award	Outstanding Directorial Achievement in Television	Playhouse 90	"The Cruel Day"	Nominated
1962	Primetime Emmy Award	Outstanding Directorial Achievement in Drama	The Defenders	Various	Won
1963	Directors Guild of America Award	Outstanding Directorial Achievement in Television	A Tour of the White House with Mrs. John F. Kennedy	—N/a	Nominated
