= Hurricane Smith (1992 film) =

- Theatrical film poster
- Directed by: Colin Budds
- Written by: Peter A. Kinloch; Kevin James Dobson
- Produced by: Daniel O'Toole; Stanley O'Toole
- Starring: Carl Weathers; Jürgen Prochnow; Cassandra Delaney; Tony Bonner
- Cinematography: John Stokes
- Edited by: Pippa Anderson
- Music by: Brian May
- Production company: Village Roadshow Pictures
- Distributed by: Warner Bros.
- Release dates: 31 January 1992 (U.S.); 9 April 1992 (Australia)
- Running time: 86 minutes
- Country: Australia
- Language: English
- Budget: A$5 million
- Box office: A$89,467 (Australia)

Hurricane Smith (also known as Dead on Delivery) is a 1992 Australian action film directed by Colin Budds and starring Carl Weathers as an American oil field worker named Billy 'Hurricane' Smith who travels to Australia on a quest to rescue his sister, where he gets mixed up with drug smugglers. It was the final theatrical production in which Stanley O'Toole served as film producer before his death on June 12, 2004.

== Plot ==
Billy 'Hurricane' Smith (Carl Weathers) is a construction worker in Marshall, Texas. Mourning his mother's death, Billy goes to Australia to find his missing sister. His search leads him to a pimp, Shanks (David Argue), and one of his hookers, Julie (Cassandra Delaney), who both knew Billy's sister.

Billy is tortured by his sister's former employer, crime boss Charlie Dowd (Jurgen Prochnow), who's secretly waging a turf war against his partner Howard Fenton (Tony Bonner), and Billy is not about to leave town without finding his sister—and then Billy discovers that his sister was murdered by Charlie.

Not only does Shanks endure a savage beating to help Billy, but Shanks is also killed when they storm Charlie's mansion in search of the now-kidnapped Julie.

Ever busy Charlie has already blown up Howard in an explosion which almost killed Billy, and has murdered his own girlfriend just to eliminate loose ends. With the SWAT team called in, Charlie uses Julie as a shield after his men are wiped out.

Charlie commandeers a chopper. Climbing onto the bottom of the chopper, which flies over a part of the ocean, Billy throws Charlie into the water below, where Charlie is killed by a swarm of sharks—the same way Charlie killed Billy's sister.

Billy is now free to make plans to bring Julie stateside, where they won't run into any of her former customers.

== Cast ==
- Carl Weathers as Billy 'Hurricane' Smith
- Jürgen Prochnow as Charlie Dowd
- Cassandra Delaney as Julie
- Tony Bonner as Howard Fenton
- David Argue as Shanks
- John Ewart as David Griffiths
- Louise McDonald as Annabel
- Suzie MacKenzie as Rochelle
- Karen Hall as Francie
- Johnny Raaen as Arkie Davis

== Production ==
Inspired by Wim Wenders’ 1984 cult movie Paris, Texas, filmmaker Kevin J. Dobson initially planned to shoot the film around the wharves of Port Melbourne and South Melbourne, the Melbourne CBD and Melton.

The film was ultimately shot in Brisbane and on the Gold Coast and at Warner Roadshow Movie World Studios (now Village Roadshow Studios) in Queensland, Australia from May 9 to June 29, 1990.

The film was the third in a series of low budget films, as part of Village Roadshow’s 'The Silver Series', following 1990 slasher/horror flick, Bloodmoon and thriller, Dead Sleep (starring American actress, Linda Blair in the latter). The Silver Series reflected a departure from stereotypical Australian films of the past. The intention was to appeal to a new international market, based on the drawcard that films could be produced in Australia at a significantly lower cost than in the USA.

== Release ==
After Village Roadshow Pictures filed for Chapter 11 bankruptcy in March 2025, with its library sold to Alcon Entertainment for $417.5 million on June 18, 2025, Roadshow Films handles the distribution rights in Australia, while Warner Bros. Pictures (via Alcon Entertainment) handles the distribution rights in all other territories.

== Box office ==
Hurricane Smith grossed A$89,467 at the box office in Australia, against a budget of A$5 million.

== See also ==
- Cinema of Australia
- List of films shot in Queensland
- List of films shot on the Gold Coast
- Village Roadshow Studios
