= Liquid Bridge =

- DVD cover
- Directed by: Phillip Avalon
- Written by: Pim Hendrix
- Produced by: Phillip Avalon
- Starring: Ryan Kwanten; Simone Kessell; Jarrod Dean; Carmen Duncan; Tony Bonner; Nathaniel Lees; Jeremy Sims
- Cinematography: Roger Buckingham
- Edited by: David Stiven
- Music by: Brett Rosenberg
- Distributed by: InterTropic Films
- Release date: 22 May 2003
- Running time: 98 minutes
- Country: Australia
- Language: English
- Box office: A$1,000,112 (Australia)

Liquid Bridge is a 2003 Australian film starring Ryan Kwanten.

== Synopsis ==
The film concerns aspiring pro surfer Nick McCallum (Ryan Kwanten), who is held back from achieving fame by his disabled father. However, after being framed for smuggling drugs and jailed, he fights to prove his innocence.

== Cast ==
- Ryan Kwanten as Nick McCallum
- Simone Kessell as Jeanne
- Jarrod Dean as Dane Sanders
- Jeremy Sims as Tony
- Tony Bonner as Bob McCallum
- Carmen Duncan as Vera McCallum
- Nathaniel Lees as Ogitani
- Lani Tupu as Sharky Garcia
- Shane Briant as Carl Sinclair
- Linal Haft as Sam Johnson
- Mathew Wilkinson as Frank

== Production ==
The film was based around a surfing incident Avalon learned about from his friend Brian Williams. At Mavericks, at Half Moon Bay, a surf location in Northern California, a surfer called Mark Foo drowned. Avalon and Williams decided to make a film around big wave surfing. A script was written by Pim Hendrix.

Liquid Bridge was announced in 1998 as part of a slate of five films from Avalon worth $20 million. Jack Campbell originally signed to play the lead. The film was not made until several years later. Avalon later said the film took 16 drafts over seven years.

After making The Finder Avalon wanted to make it as part of a slate of three films, the others being The Backstreet General and The Pact. The Pact was made first, and did well enough for Liquid Bridge to be financed. It was one of the last films made under 10BA.

== See also ==
- Cinema of Australia
