= Ben Nicholas =

Australian actor

Ben Nicholas (born 10 December 1987) is an Australian actor, known for playing Scott "Stingray" Timmins in the Australian soap opera Neighbours.

== Early and personal life ==
Nicholas was born on 10 December 1987. He was raised in Adelaide, South Australia, before he moved to Melbourne, Victoria, where he attended Carey Grammar School.

Nicholas is married to Stephanie Lilja. Their first child was born on 23 June 2022.

== Career ==
In 2004, Nicholas joined the cast of the Australian soap opera Neighbours as Stingray Timmins. During his time on the show, Nicholas received a nomination for the Logie Award for Most Popular New Male Talent. His final performance as Stingray aired on 23 March 2007, when his character was killed off.

Following his Neighbours stint, Nicholas travelled from Australia to the UK to perform pantomimes over the Christmas period. In December 2006, he performed at the Marlowe Theatre, Canterbury, as Jack in Jack and the Beanstalk. He performed in Cinderella in the Gordon Craig Theatre in Stevenage from 1 December 2007 until 27 January 2008. He appeared in Jack and the Beanstalk once more, playing the titular role of Jack, at the Gordon Craig Theatre from 29 November 2008 until 25 January 2009. He was also involved with The Rayz, a London-based band which toured during September–October 2007, playing over 40 dates.

Nicholas appeared on BBC's Celebrity Scissorhands for Children in Need 2007.

Nicholas appeared in the stage version of the Disney film High School Musical in London, playing the part of Jack Scott. The shows ran from Saturday 28 June 2008 until Sunday 31 August 2008 in the Hammersmith Apollo London. After moving back to Australia, he played Pepper in the Australian tour of Mamma Mia!

In 2015, Nicholas created, wrote and starred in the spoof game show series Footballer Wants A Wife, which was funded by Screen Australia. He played the lead role of Steven Papakonstantinou. In 2020, Nicholas appeared in the miniseries Halifax: Retribution as a truck driver.

Nicholas runs the content creation agency Wedid Productions.

== Filmography ==
=== Television ===
Year	Title	Role	Type
1999	Chuck Finn	Sam	TV series, episode: "Chuck Who"
2004	Good Morning Australia	Guest	TV series
2004–2007	Neighbours	Stingray Timmins	Series regular
2005	Scooter: Secret Agent	Vern	TV series, episode: "Operation: Mask-in-a-Can"
2006	Australia's Brainiest Kid	Self	TV series, 1 episode
2007	TMi	Guest	TV series, 1 episode
2007	Celebrity Scissorhands for Children in Need 2007	Guest	TV special
2013	The Cheerleader Diaries	Zac	TV series, 1 episode
2014	Neighbours vs Zombies	Stingray Timmins	Webseries
2015	Make... or Break	Michael Daniels	TV series,
2015	Footballer Wants a Wife	Steven Papakonstantinou	Mockumentary web miniseries, 6 episodes
2015	Waste of Time		TV series
2017	Neighbours vs Time Travel	Stingray Timmins	Webseries
2018	Flunk	Manager	TV series, 1 episode
2019	Utopia	Kostas	TV series, 1 episode
2019	Lucy and DiC	Matt	TV series, 8 episodes
2020	Halifax: Retribution	Truck driver	TV series, 1 episode

== Theatre ==
Year	Title	Role	Type
1999	Les Misérables	Sam	
2000	The Boy From Oz	Young Peter Allen	
2001	The Sound of Music	Kurt von Trapp	
2002	Singin' in the Rain	Young Cosmo & Don	
2002	Oliver!	The Artful Dodger	Regent Theatre, Melbourne & Singapore with IMG
2004	Neighbours Rocky Horror Show		Regent Theatre, Melbourne
2005	A Bunch of Ratbags		Theatreworks, Melbourne
2005	9 to 5		The Dragonfly Theatre & Cabaret Restaurant, Melbourne
2006–07	Jack and the Beanstalk	Jack Trott	Marlowe Theatre, Canterbury, UK
2007	Oliver!	The Artful Dodger	Central Theatre, Chatham, UK
2007–08	Cinderella	Buttons	Gordon Craig Theatre, UK
2008	High School Musical: Live on Stage	Narrator / Jack Scott	Hammersmith Apollo, UK
2008–09	Jack and the Beanstalk	Jack Trott	Gordon Craig Theatre, UK
2009–10	Mamma Mia!	Pepper	Lyric Theatre, Sydney, Her Majesty's Theatre, Melbourne, Burswood Theatre, Perth, Lyric Theatre, Brisbane

== Awards and nominations ==
Year	Award	Category	Work	Result	Ref.
2005	Logie Awards	Most Popular New Male Talent	Neighbours	Nominated	
2005	Inside Soap Awards	Best Newcomer	Neighbours	Nominated	
2006	Ellerton Awards	Best Male Stage Dancer (with Chris Heyes)		Won	
2008	Digital Spy Soap Awards	Best Exit	Neighbours	Nominated	
