= Tony Bonner =

Australian actor and singer

Tony Bonner AM
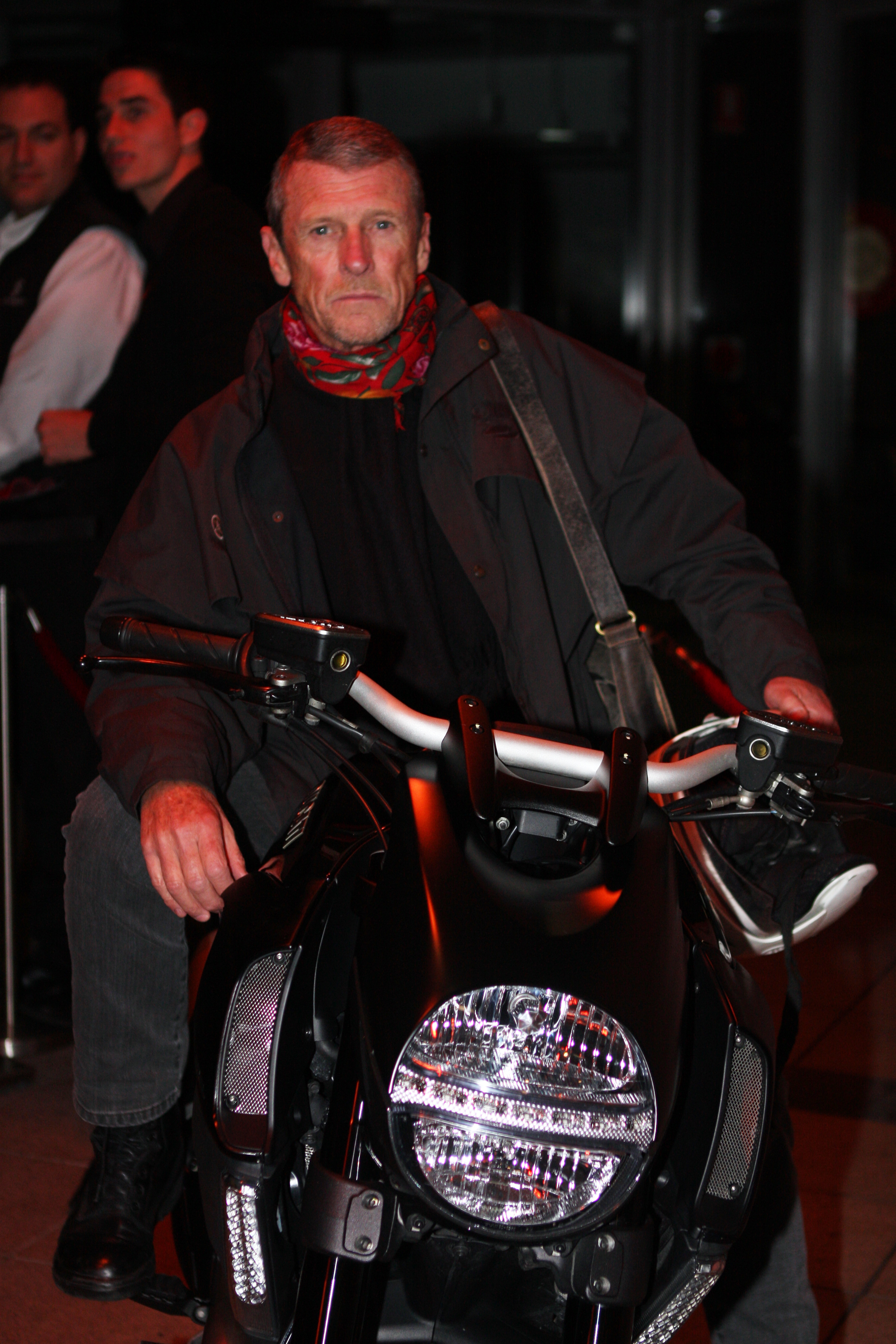
- Bonner in May 2011
- Born: Anthony Frederick Bonner; Manly, New South Wales, Australia
- Occupations: Actor, singer
- Years active: 1961–present
- Spouse: Nola Clark (1972–1992)
- Children: Chelsea Bonner

Anthony Frederick Bonner AM (born 23 November 1943) is an Australian television, film, and stage actor and singer. Bonner became famous in the 1960s children's television series Skippy the Bush Kangaroo, later moving on to lead roles in the dramas Cop Shop and Skyways.

== Early life and education ==
Anthony Frederick Bonner was born in Manly, a northern beach suburb of Sydney. His grandfather, James Bonner, was a former Mayor of Manly and founding President of the Manly Life Saving Club. His father, Frederick Bonner, was a musical comedy actor at Her Majesty's Theatre, Sydney. His mother was born Josephine Sheidow and was, a 1935 article announcing her engagement to Frederick Bonner claimed, 'well known in the swimming world.' She was also known as a singer.

After leaving school Bonner started work for a company supplying mannequins and other equipment for window dressing. He also worked part-time in his father's theatre as a wardrobe attendant, fostering his interest in acting.

== Career ==
=== Acting ===
Bonner's first professional stage acting job was in 1961, aged 18. His first major role was as helicopter pilot Jerry King on the television series Skippy.

Bonner went on to appear in many Crawford Productions television series, including The Box, Matlock Police, Division 4, Cop Shop, Skyways, and Carson's Law.

In 1970–71, he had a guest role in one episode of the UK-based ITC television series The Persuaders! starring Tony Curtis and Roger Moore. He featured in an advertising campaign for the Ballajura real estate development in Western Australia in the late 1970s.

His notable film roles include Eyewitness (1970), You Can't Win 'Em All (1970), Creatures the World Forgot (1971), Inn of the Damned (1975), The Mango Tree (1977), Money Movers (1978), The Man from Snowy River (1982), The Highest Honor (1983), Quigley Down Under (1990), Dead Sleep (1990), Hurricane Smith (1992), and Liquid Bridge (2003). He has twice portrayed Australian World War I soldier Murray Bourchier, to whom he bears a remarkable likeness, in the 1987 film The Lighthorsemen and a 1993 episode of The Young Indiana Jones Chronicles.

Bonner also starred in the 1985 TV mini-series Anzacs. He played Lieutenant (later Captain) Harold Armstrong, commanding officer of the 8th Battalion (Australia) of the First Australian Imperial Force in 1914, from the Gallipoli in 1915 to the Western Front.

In 2002, he joined the cast of Australian soap opera Neighbours in the recurring role of surgeon Martin Cook.

Bonner has done advertising work, such as playing veteran burger-naming expert Ken Thomas in a 2007 McDonald's ad campaign.

In September 2008, Bonner sued Fauna Productions Pty Ltd, the production company for Skippy the Bush Kangaroo, seeking residuals from merchandising and DVD sales.

He acted in William Kelly's War (2014) and Landfall (2017), both filmed and produced in Australia.

=== Music ===
Bonner recorded a cover version of the Bee Gees song "Wine and Women" in 1968. This track ended up on his debut album, titled “Introducing Australia’s tony bonner.” He later appeared with Barry Gibb on an episode of Bandstand.

That same year, bonner released one single, “myst’ry man/would you love me girl” in 1968

Later in his career Bonner appeared in several stage musicals, including Annie Get Your Gun and How to Succeed in Business Without Really Trying.

== Personal life ==
Bonner was married to Australian actress and model Nola Clark. One daughter, Chelsea Bonner, is the owner and director of a plus-size modelling agency.

Bonner is patron of several charities including The Smith Family and the Wesley Mission suicide prevention program. He has also served on the board of the Variety Club and is Publicity Officer and past President of the Manly Life Saving Club.

In 2017 Bonner was appointed a Member of the Order of Australia for significant service to the performing arts as an actor, to surf lifesaving, and to the community through charitable organisations.

== Filmography ==
=== Film ===
Year	Title	Role	Type
1965	Rusty Bugles		TV movie
1965	Tartuffe	Valere	TV movie
1966	They're a Weird Mob	Lifesaver	Feature film
1970	Eyewitness	Tom Jones	Feature film
1970	You Can't Win 'Em All	Reese	Feature film
1971	Creatures the World Forgot	Toomak 'The Fair Boy'	Feature film
1975	La polizia accusa: il servizio segreto uccide (aka Silent Action)	Uncredited	Feature film
1975	Inn of the Damned	Trooper Moore	Feature film
1976	2000 Million Years Later		Short film)
1977	The Alternative	Peter	TV movie
1977	End of Summer		TV movie
1977	The Mango Tree	Captain Hinkler	Feature film
1978	Money Movers	Leo Bassett	Feature film
1978	Image of Death	Karl	TV movie
1989	Players in the Gallery		TV movie
1980	Hard Knocks	Bar Patron	Feature film
1981	Intimate Strangers	Jerome Hartog	TV movie
1982	The Man from Snowy River	Kane	Feature film
1983	The Highest Honor	Lieutenant W.G. Carey	Feature film
1986	The Last Frontier	Tom Hannon	TV movie
1988	The Tourist	John Ramsden	TV movie
1987	The Lighthorsemen	Murray Bourchier	Feature film
1990	Quigley Down Under	Dobkin	Feature film
1990	Dead Sleep	Dr. Jonathan Heckett	Feature film
1992	Hurricane Smith	Howard Fenton	Feature film
1992	Academy	Jack Steele	Feature film
	The Venus Factory	Roger Hammond	Feature film
2003	Liquid Bridge	Bob McCallum	Feature film
2008	Punishment	Stephen Dunbar	Feature film
2009	Inseperable Coil	Dr Peterson	Short film
2014	William Kelly's War	Mr Kelly	Feature film
2017	Landfall	Trevor	Feature film
2018	Dots	The Doctor	Short film
2018	Beats	Pa	Short film
2021	Him	Reg	Feature film
2023	Handled	Don	Short film

=== Television ===
Year	Title	Role	Type
1965	My Brother Jack		TV miniseries, 1 episode)
1966	My Name's McGooley, What's Yours?	Party Bloke	TV series, 1 episode
1968-79	Skippy	Jerry King	TV series, 207 episodes
1970-71	The Persuaders!	Jon	TV series, 1 episode
1974	The Box	Monte	TV series
1974	The Evil Touch	Pilot / Tom Leeds	TV series, 2 episodes
1974	Division 4	Chris Rapp	TV series, 1 episode
1974	Marion	Joe	TV miniseries, 1 episode
1974	Matlock Police	Graham Cotton	TV series, 1 episode
1974	Certain Women		TV series, 2 episodes
1975	Cash and Company	Titus Ruffler	TV miniseries, 1 episode
1975	The Rise and Fall of Wellington Boots		TV series
1975-76	Homicide	Denny Connell / Brett Chilton / Ric Parsons / Russell Craig	TV series, 4 episodes
1976	Bluey	James Conder	TV series, 1 episode
1976	Power Without Glory	Brendan West	TV miniseries, 6 episodes
1977	Chopper Squad	Frank	TV series, 1 episode
1977-78	Cop Shop	Detective Snr Constable Don McKenna	TV series, 29 episodes
1980	Lawson's Mates	Joe Wilson	TV series, 1 episode
1978-80	Skyways	Paul MacFarlane	TV series, 83 episodes
1981	Outbreak of Love	Russell Lockwood	TV miniseries
1984	Special Squad	Carver	TV series, 1 episode
1984	Carson's Law	Chris Dalton	TV series, 25 episodes
1985	Anzacs	Lieutenant (later Captain) Harold Armstrong	TV miniseries, 4 episodes
1986	Murder, She Wrote	First Secretary Henry Claymore	TV series, 1 episode
1993	The Young Indiana Jones Chronicles	Murray Bourchier	TV series, 1 episode
1992-93	E Street	Roger Tate	TV series, 4 episodes
1996	Pacific Drive		TV series
1999	Home and Away	Roger Lansdowne	TV series, 5 episodes
2000	Pizza	SAS Captain	TV series, 1 episode
2002	Neighbours	Martin Cook	TV series, 15 episodes
2015	Shit Creek	Diamond Jack	TV miniseries

== Theatre ==
Bonner has had experience as a stage actor and director, including:

=== As actor ===
Year	Title	Role	Type
1987	The Three Musketeers		Playhouse, Melbourne
1996	Only When I Laugh		Newcastle Civic Theatre, Regal Theatre, Perth
1996	The Cellophane Ceiling		Twelfth Night Theatre
2001	Are You Being Served?		Twelfth Night Theatre
	Annie Get Your Gun		
	How to Succeed in Business Without Really Trying		

=== As director ===
Year	Title	Role	Type
2008	One Flew Over the Cuckoo's Nest	Director	Cavern Theatre Noosa, Cremorne Theatre
