= Alec Mills (cinematographer) =

British cinematographer (1932–2024)

Alec Mills B.S.C.
- Born: 10 May 1932; London, England
- Died: 12 February 2024 (aged 91); Denham, Buckinghamshire, England
- Occupation: Cinematographer
- Years active: 1946-2001
- Notable work: The Living Daylights; Licence to Kill
- Spouse: Zsuzsanna Szemes (m. 1977)
- Children: 2 (Simon & Belinda)

Alec Mills (10 May 1932 – 12 February 2024) was a British cinematographer, known for his work on several James Bond films. He was the cinematographer for The Living Daylights (1987) and Licence to Kill (1989). He was a camera operator for On Her Majesty's Secret Service (1969), The Spy Who Loved Me (1977), Moonraker (1979), For Your Eyes Only (1981), and Octopussy (1983). He was also a camera operator for films like Macbeth (1971), The Hiding Place (1975), and Death on the Nile (1978). After retiring from active film-making, he taught at the National Film and Television School in Beaconsfield. He was the founding chairman of the Guild of British Camera Technicians in 1977 and served on the board of governors of the British Society of Cinematographers between 1998 and 2009.

== Personal life and death ==
Mills was born on 10 May 1932 in London, England. He had two children from his first marriage to Elizabeth Tildesley, which ended in divorce, and married Zsuzsanna Szemes in 1977. Mills died in Denham, Buckinghamshire on 12 February 2024, at the age of 91, after suffering from dementia.
