= List of awards and nominations received by Neighbours =

Neighbours awards and nominations
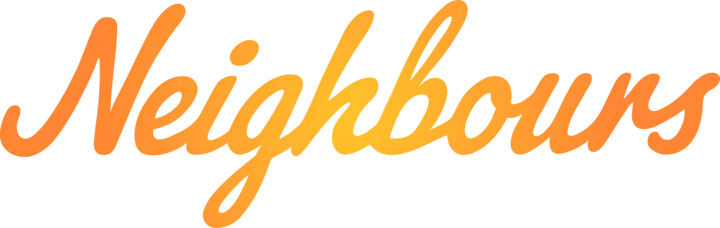
Awards and nominations
| Award | Wins | Nominations |
| All About Soap Awards | 1 | 12 |
| AACTA Awards | 1 | 6 |
| Australian Cosmopolitan Fun Fearless Female Of The Year Awards | 0 | 2 |
| Australian Directors' Guild Awards | 4 | 15 |
| AWGIE Awards | 8 | 42 |
| British Soap Awards | 0 | 2 |
| Casting Guild of Australia | 0 | 1 |
| Daytime Emmy Awards | 0 | 3 |
| Digital Spy Reader Awards | 5 | 85 |
| Dolly Teen Choice Awards | 3 | 9 |
| Equity Ensemble Awards | 0 | 2 |
| IKEA Awards | 1 | 1 |
| Inside Soap Awards (AU) | 1 | 1 |
| Inside Soap Awards | 26 | 308 |
| Logie Awards | 31 | 96 |
| Monte-Carlo Television Festival | 1 | 1 |
| National Television Awards | 0 | 16 |
| Nickelodeon Australian Kids' Choice Awards | 2 | 11 |
| Penguin Awards | 5 | 5 |
| People's Choice Awards | 1 | 2 |
| RadioTimes.com Awards | 6 | 6 |
| Rose d'Or Awards | 0 | 2 |
| Seoul International Drama Awards | 0 | 1 |
| Soap Extra Awards | 4 | 4 |
| TV Choice Awards | 0 | 1 |
| TV Quick Awards | 0 | 1 |
| TV Tonight Awards | 3 | 10 |
| TV Week and Soap Extra #OMGAwards | 0 | 14 |

Totals (Note: Certain award groups do not simply award one winner. They acknowledge several different recipients, have runners-up, and have third place. Since this is a specific recognition and is different from losing an award, runner-up mentions are considered wins in this award tally. For simplification and to avoid errors, each award in this list has been presumed to have had a prior nomination.)
- Wins: 104
- Nominations: 661

Neighbours is an Australian television soap opera that has aired since 18 March 1985. The series, its writers and directors have been nominated for a variety of different accolades, including 83 Logie Awards, 42 AWGIE Awards, over 200 Inside Soap Awards, 11 All About Soap Awards and 15 National Television Awards. The series has won 31 Logie Awards, making it the second most successful recipient behind fellow soap opera Home and Away.

Neighbours has an ensemble cast and several of its actors have received acting award nominations. Kylie Minogue has won four Logie Awards, while Ryan Moloney has won five Inside Soap Awards. Brooke Satchwell won a People's Choice Award in 1999 and Daniel O'Connor and Natalie Blair won King & Queen Of Teen at the 2007 Dolly Teen Choice Awards. Jackie Woodburne has been nominated for 25 awards, the most of any cast member. Neighbours has been nominated for over 660 awards and has won over 100.

== All About Soap Awards ==
The All About Soap Awards are hosted by All About Soap magazine.

| Year | Category | Nominee | Result | Ref |
|---|---|---|---|---|
| 2002 | Cork Open the Champers | Drew and Libby's wedding | Nominated | |
| 2003 | Wicked Weepie | Libby Kennedy (Kym Valentine) | Won | |
| 2006 | I'm A Survivor | Susan Kennedy (Jackie Woodburne) | Nominated | |
| 2007 | I'm A Survivor | Sky Mangel (Stephanie McIntosh) | Nominated | |
| 2007 | Wedding Shock | Boyd and Janae Elope | Nominated | |
| 2009 | Bad Boy | Lucas Fitzgerald (Scott Major) | Nominated | |
| 2010 | Baby Drama | Susan and Libby's surrogacy storyline | Nominated | |
| 2011 | Baby Drama | Steph gives her baby away | Nominated | |
| 2012 | Best Comeback | Malcolm Kennedy | Nominated | |
| 2013 | Best Wedding | Vanessa and Lucas | Nominated | |
| 2014 | Best Moment | The Tornado | Nominated | |
| 2014 | Best Moment | Sonya calls her stalker | Nominated | |

== AACTA Awards ==
The Australian Academy of Cinema and Television Arts Awards, also known as the AACTA Awards, recognise excellence in the film and television industries, both locally and internationally. They were originally called the Australian Film Institute Awards (AFI Awards). In 2020, AACTA introduced the AACTA Audience Choice Awards following COVID-19 restrictions, which allowed viewers to vote on Australian screen and artist achievements locally and internationally across the last decade.

| Year | Category | Nominee | Result | Ref |
|---|---|---|---|---|
| 1993 | Best Episode in a Television Drama Serial | Episode 1859 – Margaret Slarke and Sally-Anne Kerr | Nominated | |
| 1997 | Avid Technology Award for Best Episode in a Television Drama Serial | Episode 2842 – Peter Dodds | Won | |
| 1997 | Avid Technology Award for Best Episode in a Television Drama Serial | Episode 2911 – Peter Dodds | Nominated | |
| 1999 | Avid Australia Award for Best Episode in a Television Drama Series (Long) | Episode 3388 – Peter Dodds | Nominated | |
| 1999 | Avid Australia Award for Best Episode in a Television Drama Series (Long) | Episode 3389 – Peter Dodds | Nominated | |
| 2021 | Favourite Australian TV Drama | Neighbours | Nominated | |

== Australian Cosmopolitan Fun Fearless Female Of The Year Awards ==
| Year | Category | Nominee | Result | Ref |
|---|---|---|---|---|
| 2009 | Favourite TV Actress | Pippa Black | Nominated | |
| 2010 | Favourite TV Actress | Margot Robbie | Nominated | |

== Australian Directors' Guild Awards ==
| Year | Category | Nominee | Result | Ref |
|---|---|---|---|---|
| 2010 | Best Direction in a TV Drama Serial | Chris Adshead | Nominated | |
| 2010 | Best Direction in a TV Drama Serial | Jovita O'Shaughnessy for Episode 5861 | Won | |
| 2012 | Best Direction in a TV Drama Serial | Jonathon Dutton for Episode 6188 | Nominated | |
| 2012 | Best Direction in a TV Drama Serial | Ralph Strasser for Episode 6065 | Nominated | |
| 2013 | Best Direction in a TV Drama Serial | Jovita O'Shaughnessy for Episode 6472 | Nominated | |
| 2015 | Best Direction in a TV Drama Serial | Chris Langman for Episode 6962 | Nominated | |
| 2017 | Best Direction in a TV or SVOD Drama Serial | Gary Conway for Episode 7509 | Won | |
| 2018 | Best Direction in a TV or SVOD Drama Serial | Chris Adshead for Episode 7562 | Nominated | |
| 2018 | Best Direction in a TV or SVOD Drama Serial | Kath Hayden for Episode 7726 | Nominated | |
| 2019 | Best Direction in a TV or SVOD Drama Serial episode | Scott Major for Episode 7776A | Won | |
| 2019 | Best Direction in a TV or SVOD Drama Serial episode | Scott Major for Episode 7776B | Nominated | |
| 2020 | Best Direction in a TV or SVOD Drama Serial | Tony Gardiner for Episode 8325 | Nominated | |
| 2020 | Best Direction of a TV or SVOD Drama Serial | Kate Kendall for Episode 8052 | Won | |
| 2021 | Best Direction in a TV or SVOD Drama Serial episode | Scott Major for Episode 8573 | Nominated | |
| 2021 | Best Direction in a TV or SVOD Drama Serial episode | Tenika Smith for Episode 8490 | Nominated | |

== Australian Writers Guild Awards ==
The AWGIE Awards are an annual awards ceremony hosted by the Australian Writers' Guild for excellence in television, stage and radio writing.

| Year | Category | Nominee | Result | Ref |
|---|---|---|---|---|
| 1999 | Television — Serial | John Upton for Episode 3151 | Nominated | |
| 2000 | Television — Serial | Jon Stephens for Episode 3444 | Nominated | |
| 2001 | Television — Serial | John Hanlon for Episode 3740 | Won | |
| 2003 | Television — Serial | Anthony Morris for Episode 4189 | Nominated | |
| 2003 | Television — Serial | Jeffrey Truman for Episode 4155 | Nominated | |
| 2004 | Television — Serial | John Hanlon for Episode 4293 | Won | |
| 2004 | Television — Serial | Philippa Burne for Episode 4456 | Nominated | |
| 2005 | Television — Serial | Drew Proffitt for "Soul Patching" (episode 4574) | Nominated | |
| 2006 | Television — Serial | Katrina Foster for "God's Will Be Done" (episode 4838) | Nominated | |
| 2006 | Television — Serial | Peter Mattessi for "Prenatal Depression" (episode 4749) | Nominated | |
| 2006 | Television — Serial | Anthony Morris for "Bad Samaritan" (episode 4881) | Nominated | |
| 2007 | Television — Serial | David Hannam for "Cop Ya, Neighbours" (episode 5175) | Nominated | |
| 2008 | Television — Serial | Scott Taylor for Episode 5430 | Nominated | |
| 2008 | Television — Serial | Anthony Morris for Episode 5431 | Nominated | |
| 2009 | Television — Serial | John Davies for Episode 5474 | Nominated | |
| 2009 | Television — Serial | Anthony Morris for Episode 5486 | Nominated | |
| 2010 | Television — Serial | Rene Zandveld for Episode 5782 | Nominated | |
| 2011 | Television — Serial | Anthony Morris for Episode 6018 | Nominated | |
| 2012 | Television — Serial | Pete McTighe for Episode 6231 | Nominated | |
| 2014 | Television — Serial | Stephen Vagg for Episode 6744 | Nominated | |
| 2014 | Television — Serial | Margaret Wilson for Episode 6820 | Nominated | |
| 2014 | Television — Serial | Alexa Wyatt for Episode 6836 | Nominated | |
| 2014 | Television — Serial | Stephen Vagg for Episode 6857 | Won | |
| 2015 | Television — Serial | Emma J. Steele for Episode 6943 | Nominated | |
| 2015 | Television Serial | Nick King for Episode 6962 | Nominated | |
| 2016 | Television — Serial | Jason Herbison for Episode 7202 | Won | |
| 2016 | Television Serial | Peter Mattessi for Episode 7284 | Nominated | |
| 2017 | Television — Serial | Sam Meikle for Episode 7414 | Nominated | |
| 2017 | Television — Serial | Sue Hore for Episode 7477 | Nominated | |
| 2017 | Television — Serial | Peter Mattessi for Episode 7492 | Nominated | |
| 2018 | Television — Serial | Peter Mattessi for Episode 7776 | Won | |
| 2019 | Television — Serial | Jason Herbison for Episode 8052 | Won | |
| 2021 | Television — Serial | Jessica Paine for Episode 8328 | Nominated | |
| 2021 | Television — Serial | Peter Mattessi for Episode 8367 | Won | |
| 2021 | Television — Serial | Jason Herbison for Episode 8498 | Nominated | |
| 2022 | Television — Serial | Jessica Paine for Episode 8654 | Nominated | |
| 2022 | Television — Serial | Emma J Steele for Episode 8801 | Nominated | |
| 2023 | Television — Serial | Jason Herbison for Episode 8903 | Nominated | |
| 2023 | Television — Serial | Sarah Mayberry for Episode 8867 | Won | |
| 2024 | Television — Serial | Paul Gartside for Episode 8983 | Nominated | |
| 2024 | Television — Serial | Ceinwen Langley for Episode 8989 | Nominated | |
| 2025 | Television — Serial | Emma J. Steele for Episode 9104 | Nominated | |

== Daytime Emmy Awards ==
Neighbours became eligible for the Daytime Emmy Awards following its 2023 revival on Amazon Freevee, as it is financed and distributed by Amazon MGM Studios.

| Year | Category | Nominee | Result | Ref |
|---|---|---|---|---|
| 2024 | Outstanding Drama Series | Neighbours | Nominated | |
| 2024 | Outstanding Guest Performer in a Drama Series | Guy Pearce | Nominated | |
| 2025 | Outstanding Technical Direction, Camerawork, Video | Neighbours | Nominated | |

== Digital Spy Reader Awards ==
The Digital Spy Soap Awards were created and hosted by entertainment website Digital Spy. The awards celebrate moments in British and Australian soap operas, and were first presented in 2008, where Neighbours was nominated in 13 of the 14 categories. From 2014, the awards became the annual Digital Spy Reader Awards, which polls readers for the best moments in various categories, including television soap operas, films, and tech.

| Year | Category | Nominee | Result | Ref |
|---|---|---|---|---|
| 2008 | Best Soap | Neighbours | Nominated | |
| 2008 | Most Popular Actor | Alan Fletcher | Nominated | |
| 2008 | Most Popular Actress | Jackie Woodburne | Nominated | |
| 2008 | Best Single Episode | Frazer Yeats and Rosetta Cammeniti's wedding/Bus Crash | Nominated | |
| 2008 | Storyline of the Year | Karl, Susan and Izzy in London | Nominated | |
| 2008 | Best On-Screen Partnership | Alan Fletcher and Jackie Woodburne (Karl and Susan Kennedy) | Nominated | |
| 2008 | Villain of the Year | Stefan Dennis (Paul Robinson) | Nominated | |
| 2008 | Best Newcomer | Nicky Whelan (Pepper Steiger) | Nominated | |
| 2008 | Best Child Actor (Under 16) | Fletcher O'Leary (Mickey Gannon) | Nominated | |
| 2008 | Sexiest Male | Ben Lawson | Nominated | |
| 2008 | Sexiest Female | Nicky Whelan | Nominated | |
| 2008 | Best Exit | Ben Nicholas (Stingray Timmins) | Nominated | |
| 2008 | Best Pet | Pouch the kangaroo | Nominated | |
| 2014 | Best Soap | Neighbours | Nominated | |
| 2015 | Best Actor | Carla Bonner (Stephanie Scully) | Nominated | |
| 2015 | Best Cliffhanger | Harold sees Madge | Nominated | |
| 2015 | Best 'It Could Only Happen in a Soap' Moment | Madge's ghost | Nominated | |
| 2015 | Best Kiss | Brad and Lauren | Nominated | |
| 2015 | Best LOL Moment | Erinsborough Bake-Off | Nominated | |
| 2015 | Best Newcomer | Travis Burns (Tyler Brennan) | Nominated | |
| 2015 | Best Performance by an Animal | Bossy | Nominated | |
| 2015 | Best Soap | Neighbours | Nominated | |
| 2015 | Best Storyline | Brad and Lauren's betrayal | Nominated | |
| 2015 | Most Tearjerking Moment | Matt dies | Nominated | |
| 2016 | Best Actor | Stefan Dennis | Nominated | |
| 2016 | Best Actress | Carla Bonner | Nominated | |
| 2016 | Best Newcomer | Lilly Van Der Meer (Xanthe Canning) | Nominated | |
| 2016 | Best Ship | Tyler and Piper | Nominated | |
| 2016 | Best Soap | Neighbours | Nominated | |
| 2016 | Best Storyline | An explosion rocks Lassiters | Nominated | |
| 2016 | Biggest OMG Moment | Jack is revealed as a priest | Nominated | |
| 2016 | Biggest Unsung Hero | Felix Mallard (Ben Kirk) | Nominated | |
| 2016 | Funniest Character | Sheila Canning | Nominated | |
| 2017 | Best Soap Actor | Travis Burns (Tyler Brennan) | Nominated | |
| 2017 | Best Soap Actor | Ryan Moloney (Toadfish Rebecchi) | Nominated | |
| 2017 | Best Soap Actress | Eve Morey (Sonya Rebecchi) | Nominated | |
| 2017 | Best Soap Actress | Jackie Woodburne (Susan Kennedy) | Nominated | |
| 2017 | Best Soap Newcomer | Scarlet Vas (Mishti Sharma) | Nominated | |
| 2017 | Best Soap Relationship | Tyler Brennan and Piper Willis | Nominated | |
| 2017 | Best Soap | Neighbours | Nominated | |
| 2017 | Best Soap Storyline | Fake Dee cons Toadie | Nominated | |
| 2017 | Best Soap Stunt | The Backpackers crash | Nominated | |
| 2017 | Best Soap Villain | Fake Dee | Nominated | |
| 2017 | Biggest OMG Soap Moment | Dee Bliss revealed as a fake | Nominated | |
| 2017 | Funniest Character | Sheila Canning | Nominated | |
| 2018 | Best Soap Actor (Female) | Mavournee Hazel | 8th | |
| 2018 | Best Soap Actor (Male) | Stefan Dennis (Paul Robinson) | 10th | |
| 2018 | Best Soap Couple | David Tanaka and Aaron Brennan | 7th | |
| 2018 | Best Soap (Daytime) | Neighbours | Won | |
| 2018 | Best Soap Newcomer | Joe Davidson (Cassius Grady) | 10th | |
| 2018 | Best Soap Newcomer | April Rose Pengilly (Chloe Brennan) | 6th | |
| 2018 | Best Soap Storyline | Dee or Andrea? | 8th | |
| 2018 | Best Soap Stunt | Tyler and Piper's rooftop horror | 7th | |
| 2018 | Biggest OMG Soap Moment | Cassius kills Hamish | 7th | |
| 2018 | Most Bizarre Soap Storyline | Izzy steals Karl's sperm | 7th | |
| 2019 | Best Daytime Soap | Neighbours | Won | |
| 2019 | Best Soap Newcomer | Jemma Donovan (Harlow Robinson) | 5th | |
| 2019 | Best Soap Storyline | Sonya's cancer | 5th | |
| 2019 | Most Devastating Soap Death | Sonya Rebecchi | 5th | |
| 2019 | OMG Soap Moment | Dee is still alive | 5th | |
| 2020 | Best Daytime Soap | Neighbours | Won | |
| 2021 | Best Daytime Soap | Neighbours | Won | |
| 2022 | Best Daytime Soap | Neighbours | 2nd | |
| 2022 | Best Soap Couple | Karl and Susan Kennedy | 3rd | |
| 2023 | Best Daytime Soap | Neighbours | Won | |
| 2023 | Best Soap Couple | Karl and Susan Kennedy | 3rd | |
| 2023 | Rising Star | Naomi Rukavina (Remi Varga-Murphy) | 5th | |
| 2024 | Best Actor | Stefan Dennis (Paul Robinson) | Nominated | |
| 2024 | Best Actor | Rebekah Elmaloglou (Terese Willis) | Nominated | |
| 2024 | Best Actor | Naomi Rukavina (Remi Varga-Murphy) | Nominated | |
| 2024 | Best Daytime Soap | Neighbours | 2nd | |
| 2024 | Best Soap Couple | Remi and Cara Varga-Murphy | Nominated | |
| 2024 | Best Soap Storyline | Toadie/Melanie/Paul/Terese love square | Nominated | |
| 2024 | OMG Soap Moment | David is pushed to his death | Nominated | |
| 2024 | Rising Star | Riley Bryant (JJ Varga-Murphy) | Nominated | |
| 2024 | Saddest Soap Moment | David Tanaka’s fatal fall | Nominated | |
| 2025 | Best Actor | Stefan Dennis (Paul Robinson) | Nominated | |
| 2025 | Best Actor | Rebekah Elmaloglou (Terese Willis) | Nominated | |
| 2025 | Best Actor | Candice Leask (Wendy Rodwell) | Nominated | |
| 2025 | Best New Casting | Ben Jackson (Max Ramsay) | Nominated | |
| 2025 | Best Soap | Neighbours | Nominated | |
| 2025 | Best Soap Couple | Karl and Susan Kennedy | Nominated | |
| 2025 | Best Soap Storyline | Holly and Andrew's controversial affair | Nominated | |
| 2025 | OMG Soap Moment | Sadie badly burned in the garage fire | Nominated | |
| 2025 | Saddest Soap Moment | Jane discovers Amanda has died | Nominated | |

== Dolly Teen Choice Awards ==
The Dolly Teen Choice Awards are hosted by Dolly magazine.

| Year | Category | Nominee | Result | Ref |
|---|---|---|---|---|
| 2006 | Most Popular TV Show | Neighbours | Won | |
| 2006 | Best Slashie | Natalie Bassingthwaighte | Won | |
| 2007 | King & Queen Of Teen | Daniel O'Connor and Natalie Blair | Won | |
| 2008 | Glued To The Screen | Neighbours | Nominated | |
| 2008 | King Of Teen | Dean Geyer | Nominated | |
| 2010 | Sweetest Slashie | Sam Clark | Nominated | |
| 2010 | Soap Star Of The Year | Matthew Werkmeister | Nominated | |
| 2010 | Soap Star Of The Year | James Sorensen | Nominated | |
| 2010 | Soap Star Of The Year | Margot Robbie | Nominated | |

== Inside Soap Awards ==
In 1993, readers of Inside Soap magazine were asked to vote in the first Inside Soap TV Awards. The awards were later brought back as the Inside Soap Awards, and have been running every year since 1996.

| Year | Category | Nominee | Result | Ref |
|---|---|---|---|---|
| 1993 | Best Actor in Soap | Richard Huggett (tied with Ross Kemp) | 3rd | |
| 1993 | Best Actress in Soap | Melissa Bell (tied with Cathy Godbold) | 2nd | |
| 1993 | Best Aussie Soap | Neighbours | 3rd | |
| 1993 | Best Male Character | Brad Willis | 2nd | |
| 1993 | Best Male Character | Paul Robinson | 3rd | |
| 1993 | Best Soap | Neighbours | 2nd | |
| 1993 | Soap's Biggest Bitch | Faye Hudson | 2nd | |
| 1996 | Best Actor | Tom Oliver | Nominated | |
| 1996 | Best Actor | Bruce Samazan | Nominated | |
| 1996 | Best Actress | Kimberley Davies | Nominated | |
| 1996 | Best Couple | Cheryl Stark and Lou Carpenter | Nominated | |
| 1996 | Best Couple | Danni Stark and Malcolm Kennedy | Nominated | |
| 1996 | Best Foreign Soap | Neighbours | Nominated | |
| 1996 | Best Newcomer | Emma Harrison | Nominated | |
| 1996 | Best Single Performance by a Female | Helen's grief when Reuben died | Nominated | |
| 1996 | Best Single Performance by a Male | Mark's breakdown after his religious obsession | Nominated | |
| 1996 | Best Soap Plot in Past Year | Annalise and Stonefish kissing | Nominated | |
| 1996 | Best Soap Plot in Past Year | Danni and Mal moving in together | Nominated | |
| 1996 | Best Soap Plot in Past Year | Mark finding God | Nominated | |
| 1996 | Biggest Bitch in Soap | Joanna Hartman | Nominated | |
| 1996 | Most Annoying Character | Mark Gottlieb | Nominated | |
| 1996 | Most Annoying Character | Colin Taylor | Nominated | |
| 1996 | Most Upsetting Departure | Rick Alessi | Nominated | |
| 1996 | Most Upsetting Departure | Julie Martin | Nominated | |
| 1996 | Sexiest Female in Soap | Kimberley Davies | Won | |
| 1996 | Sexiest Female in Soap | Alyce Platt | Nominated | |
| 1996 | Sexiest Male in Soap | Richard Grieve | Nominated | |
| 1996 | Silliest Soap Plot Over Past Year | Dr Kennedy and the gnomes | Nominated | |
| 1996 | Silliest Soap Plot Over Past Year | Hannah's crush on Dayle | Nominated | |
| 1996 | Silliest Soap Plot Over Past Year | Serendipity's regression therapy | Nominated | |
| 1997 | Best Actor | Bernard Curry | Won | |
| 1997 | Best Couple | Libby Kennedy and Darren Stark | Nominated | |
| 1997 | Best Newcomer | Nicola Charles | Nominated | |
| 1997 | Best Newcomer | Todd MacDonald | Nominated | |
| 1997 | Best Overseas Soap | Neighbours | Nominated | |
| 1997 | Best Soap Veteran | Anne Haddy | Won | |
| 1997 | Best Soap Veteran | Moya O'Sullivan | Nominated | |
| 1997 | Best Supporting Actor | Ian Rawlings | Nominated | |
| 1997 | Best Supporting Actress | Kym Valentine | Nominated | |
| 1997 | Best Young Actor | Rebecca Ritters | Nominated | |
| 1997 | Biggest Laugh in Soap | Toadfish Rebecchi | Nominated | |
| 1997 | Character We Miss the Most | Cheryl Stark | Nominated | |
| 1997 | Character We Miss the Most | Angie Rebecchi | Nominated | |
| 1997 | Character We Miss the Most | Stonefish Rebecchi | Nominated | |
| 1997 | Sexiest Female | Nicola Charles | Nominated | |
| 1997 | Sexiest Male | Todd MacDonald | Nominated | |
| 1997 | Sexiest Male | Benjamin McNair | Nominated | |
| 1997 | Sexiest Male | Jesse Spencer | Nominated | |
| 1997 | Most Dramatic Storyline | Luke's battle with cancer | Nominated | |
| 1997 | Most Dramatic Storyline | Madge and Harold's return | Nominated | |
| 1998 | Best Actor | Alan Fletcher | Nominated | |
| 1998 | Best Actress | Anne Charleston | Nominated | |
| 1998 | Best Couple | Harold and Madge Bishop | Nominated | |
| 1998 | Best Newcomer | Brett Cousins | Nominated | |
| 1998 | Best Overseas Soap | Neighbours | Nominated | |
| 1998 | Best Young Actor | Brooke Satchwell | Nominated | |
| 1998 | Funniest Character | Toadfish Rebecchi | Nominated | |
| 1998 | Most Dramatic Storyline | Karl and Sarah's affair | Nominated | |
| 1998 | Most Missed Character | Helen Daniels | Nominated | |
| 1998 | Sexiest Man | Jesse Spencer | Nominated | |
| 1998 | Sexiest Woman | Nicola Charles | Nominated | |
| 1998 | The Love to Hate You Award for Best Guy/Girl | Sarah Beaumont | Nominated | |
| 1999 | Best Actor | Jesse Spencer | Nominated | |
| 1999 | Best Actress | Brooke Satchwell | Nominated | |
| 1999 | Best Couple | Billy Kennedy and Anne Wilkinson | Nominated | |
| 1999 | Best Newcomer | Jonathon Dutton | Nominated | |
| 1999 | Best Overseas Soap | Neighbours | Nominated | |
| 1999 | Best Young Actor | Rebecca Ritters | Nominated | |
| 1999 | Funniest Character | Toadfish Rebecchi | Nominated | |
| 1999 | Most Dramatic Storyline | Susan's discovery of Karl and Sarah's affair | Nominated | |
| 1999 | Sexiest Female | Nicola Charles | Nominated | |
| 1999 | Sexiest Male | Dan Paris | Nominated | |
| 2000 | Best Actor | Dan Paris | Nominated | |
| 2000 | Best Actress | Kym Valentine | Nominated | |
| 2000 | Best Bad Guy/Girl | Brendan Bell | Nominated | |
| 2000 | Best Couple | Drew Kirk and Libby Kennedy | Nominated | |
| 2000 | Best Newcomer | Carla Bonner | Nominated | |
| 2000 | Best Newcomer | Holly Valance | Nominated | |
| 2000 | Best Overseas Soap | Neighbours | Won | |
| 2000 | Best Young Actor | Kate Keltie | Nominated | |
| 2000 | Funniest character | Harold Bishop | Nominated | |
| 2000 | Most Dramatic Storyline | Libby and Stephanie's bike crash | Nominated | |
| 2000 | Most Missed Character | Bill Kennedy | Nominated | |
| 2000 | Sexiest Female | Holly Valance | Nominated | |
| 2000 | Sexiest Female | Krista Vendy | Nominated | |
| 2000 | Sexiest Male | Dan Paris | Nominated | |
| 2001 | Best Actor | Dan Paris | Nominated | |
| 2001 | Best Actress | Anne Charleston | Nominated | |
| 2001 | Best Couple | Libby and Drew Kirk | Nominated | |
| 2001 | Best Exit | Madge Bishop | Nominated | |
| 2001 | Best Newcomer | Mark Raffety | Nominated | |
| 2001 | Best Overseas Soap | Neighbours | Won | |
| 2001 | Best Young Actor | Kate Keltie | Nominated | |
| 2001 | Most Dramatic Storyline | Drew, Libby and Steph love triangle | Nominated | |
| 2001 | Sexiest Female | Holly Valance | Nominated | |
| 2001 | Sexiest Male | Dan Paris | Nominated | |
| 2002 | Best Actor | Dan Paris | Nominated | |
| 2002 | Best Actress | Carla Bonner | Nominated | |
| 2002 | Best Bad Boy | Mark Rafferty | Nominated | |
| 2002 | Best Couple | Drew Kirk and Libby Kennedy | Nominated | |
| 2002 | Best Soap | Neighbours | Nominated | |
| 2002 | Best Storyline | The Flick, Steph and Marc love triangle | Nominated | |
| 2002 | Best Newcomer | Maggie Millar | Nominated | |
| 2002 | Best Young Actor | Kate Keltie | Nominated | |
| 2002 | Funniest Character | Harold Bishop | Nominated | |
| 2003 | Best Actor | Mark Raffety | Nominated | |
| 2003 | Best Actress | Kym Valentine | Nominated | |
| 2003 | Best Bad Boy | Darcy Tyler | Nominated | |
| 2003 | Best Couple | Toadfish Rebecchi and Dee Bliss | Nominated | |
| 2003 | Best Family | The Scullys | Nominated | |
| 2003 | Best Newcomer | Delta Goodrem | Nominated | |
| 2003 | Best Soap | Neighbours | Nominated | |
| 2003 | Best Storyline | Dr Darcy's evil ways | Nominated | |
| 2003 | Best Young Actor | Katie Keltie | Nominated | |
| 2003 | Funniest character | Harold Bishop | Nominated | |
| 2003 | Sexiest Female | Holly Valance | Nominated | |
| 2003 | Sexiest Female | Madeleine West | Nominated | |
| 2003 | Sexiest Male | Blair McDonough | Nominated | |
| 2004 | Best Actor | Alan Fletcher | Nominated | |
| 2004 | Best Actress | Jackie Woodburne | Nominated | |
| 2004 | Best Bad Boy | Ben Barrack | Nominated | |
| 2004 | Best Bitch | Natalie Bassingthwaite | Nominated | |
| 2004 | Best Couple | Steph Scully and Max Hoyland | Nominated | |
| 2004 | Best Newcomer | Natalie Bassingthwaite | Nominated | |
| 2004 | Best Soap | Neighbours | Nominated | |
| 2004 | Best Storyline | Harold turns evil | Nominated | |
| 2004 | Best Young Actor | Marisa Siketa | Nominated | |
| 2004 | Funniest Performance | Ian Smith | Nominated | |
| 2005 | Best Actor | Alan Fletcher | Nominated | |
| 2005 | Best Actor | Stefan Dennis | Nominated | |
| 2005 | Best Actress | Natalie Bassingthwaighte | Nominated | |
| 2005 | Best Actress | Jackie Woodburne | Nominated | |
| 2005 | Best Bad Boy | Damien Bodie | Nominated | |
| 2005 | Best Bad Boy | Stefan Dennis | Nominated | |
| 2005 | Best Bitch | Natalie Bassingthwaite | Nominated | |
| 2005 | Best Couple | Steph Scully and Max Hoyland | Nominated | |
| 2005 | Best Couple | Sky Mangel and Boyd Hoyland | Nominated | |
| 2005 | Best Family | The Bishops | Nominated | |
| 2005 | Best Family | The Hoylands | Nominated | |
| 2005 | Best Newcomer | Damien Bodie | Nominated | |
| 2005 | Best Newcomer | Ben Nicholas | Nominated | |
| 2005 | Best Soap | Neighbours | Nominated | |
| 2005 | Best Storyline | Susan/Karl/Izzy love triangle | Nominated | |
| 2005 | Best Storyline | Lassiter's explosion | Nominated | |
| 2005 | Best Young Actor | Marisa Siketa | Nominated | |
| 2005 | Funniest Star | Ian Smith | Nominated | |
| 2005 | Funniest Star | Tom Oliver | Nominated | |
| 2006 | Best Actor | Stefan Dennis | Nominated | |
| 2006 | Best Actor | Ian Smith | Nominated | |
| 2006 | Best Actress | Carla Bonner | Nominated | |
| 2006 | Best Actress | Jackie Woodburne | Nominated | |
| 2006 | Best Bad Boy | Stefan Dennis | Nominated | |
| 2006 | Best Bitch | Natalie Bassingthwaite | Nominated | |
| 2006 | Best Couple | Max and Steph Hoyland | Nominated | |
| 2006 | Best Couple | Paul Robinson and Izzy Hoyland | Nominated | |
| 2006 | Best Family | The Hoylands | Nominated | |
| 2006 | Best Family | The Timmins | Nominated | |
| 2006 | Best Newcomer | Pippa Black | Nominated | |
| 2006 | Best Newcomer | Caitlin Stasey | Nominated | |
| 2006 | Best Soap | Neighbours | Nominated | |
| 2006 | Best Storyline | The Plane Crash | Nominated | |
| 2006 | Best Storyline | Steph's cancer/pregnancy | Nominated | |
| 2006 | Best Young Actor | Sianoa Smit-McPhee | Nominated | |
| 2006 | Funniest Star | Nell Feeney | Nominated | |
| 2006 | Funniest Star | Tom Oliver | Nominated | |
| 2007 | Best Actor | Stefan Dennis | Nominated | |
| 2007 | Best Actor | Alan Fletcher | Nominated | |
| 2007 | Best Actress | Eliza Taylor-Cotter | Nominated | |
| 2007 | Best Actress | Jackie Woodburne | Nominated | |
| 2007 | Sexiest Male | David Hoflin | Nominated | |
| 2007 | Sexiest Male | Daniel O'Connor | Nominated | |
| 2007 | Sexiest Female | Natalie Blair | Nominated | |
| 2007 | Sexiest Female | Nicky Whelan | Nominated | |
| 2007 | Best Bad Boy | Stefan Dennis | Nominated | |
| 2007 | Best Bad Boy | Scott Johnson | Nominated | |
| 2007 | Best Bitch | Natalie Bassingthwaighte | Nominated | |
| 2007 | Best Bitch | Pippa Black | Nominated | |
| 2007 | Best Young Actor | Sam Clark | Nominated | |
| 2007 | Best Young Actor | Caitlin Stasey | Nominated | |
| 2007 | Best Newcomer | Ben Lawson | Nominated | |
| 2007 | Best Newcomer | Natalie Saleeba | Nominated | |
| 2007 | Funniest Performance | Tom Oliver | Nominated | |
| 2007 | Funniest Performance | Ian Smith | Nominated | |
| 2007 | Best Couple | Carmella Cammeniti and Oliver Barnes | Nominated | |
| 2007 | Best Couple | Susan Kennedy and Karl Kennedy | Nominated | |
| 2007 | Best Storyline | Karl and Susan's London Wedding | Nominated | |
| 2007 | Best Storyline | Kerry's Leukaemia and Stingray's Death | Nominated | |
| 2007 | Best Soap | Neighbours | Nominated | |
| 2008 | Best Actor | Stefan Dennis | Nominated | |
| 2008 | Best Actor | Ryan Moloney | Nominated | |
| 2008 | Best Actor | Ian Smith | Nominated | |
| 2008 | Best Actress | Carla Bonner | Nominated | |
| 2008 | Best Actress | Caitlin Stasey | Nominated | |
| 2008 | Best Actress | Jackie Woodburne | Nominated | |
| 2008 | Sexiest Male | Ben Lawson | Nominated | |
| 2008 | Sexiest Male | Daniel O'Connor | Nominated | |
| 2008 | Sexiest Female | Eliza Taylor-Cotter | Nominated | |
| 2008 | Sexiest Female | Kym Valentine | Nominated | |
| 2008 | Best Bad Boy | Stefan Dennis | Nominated | |
| 2008 | Best Bitch | Nikola Dubois | Nominated | |
| 2008 | Best Young Actor | Fletcher O'Leary | Nominated | |
| 2008 | Best Young Actor | Matthew Werkmeister | Nominated | |
| 2008 | Best Newcomer | Jesse Rosenfeld | Nominated | |
| 2008 | Best Newcomer | James Sorensen | Nominated | |
| 2008 | Funniest Performance | Tom Oliver | Nominated | |
| 2008 | Funniest Performance | Ian Smith | Nominated | |
| 2008 | Best Couple | Rosetta Cammeniti and Frazer Yeats | Nominated | |
| 2008 | Best Couple | Susan Kennedy and Karl Kennedy | Nominated | |
| 2008 | Best Storyline | Carmella's Custody Battle with Oliver | Nominated | |
| 2008 | Best Storyline | Susan's MS | Nominated | |
| 2008 | Best Storyline | Toadie dumps Steph at the Altar | Nominated | |
| 2008 | Best Soap | Neighbours | Nominated | |
| 2009 | Best Actor | Stefan Dennis | Nominated | |
| 2009 | Best Actor | Alan Fletcher | Nominated | |
| 2009 | Best Actress | Kym Valentine | Nominated | |
| 2009 | Best Actress | Jackie Woodburne | Nominated | |
| 2009 | Sexiest Male | Sam Clark | Nominated | |
| 2009 | Sexiest Male | Brett Tucker | Nominated | |
| 2009 | Sexiest Female | Pippa Black | Nominated | |
| 2009 | Sexiest Female | Carla Bonner | Nominated | |
| 2009 | Best Bad Boy | Stefan Dennis | Nominated | |
| 2009 | Best Bad Boy | Fletcher Humphrys | Nominated | |
| 2009 | Best Bitch | Imogen Bailey | Nominated | |
| 2009 | Best Bitch | Tottie Goldsmith | Nominated | |
| 2009 | Best Young Actor | Blake O'Leary | Nominated | |
| 2009 | Best Young Actor | Fletcher O'Leary | Nominated | |
| 2009 | Best Newcomer | Morgan Baker | Nominated | |
| 2009 | Best Newcomer | Margot Robbie | Nominated | |
| 2009 | Funniest Performance | Margot Robbie | Nominated | |
| 2009 | Funniest Performance | Ian Smith | Nominated | |
| 2009 | Best Family | The Kennedy/Kinskis | Nominated | |
| 2009 | Best Storyline | Rafting disaster/Zeke's disappearance | Nominated | |
| 2009 | Best Storyline | Bridget's pregnancy | Nominated | |
| 2009 | Best Storyline | Harold's cancer | Nominated | |
| 2009 | Best Soap | Neighbours | Nominated | |
| 2010 | Best Daytime Soap | Neighbours | Won | |
| 2010 | Best Daytime Star | Stefan Dennis | Nominated | |
| 2010 | Best Daytime Star | Ryan Moloney | Won | |
| 2010 | Best Daytime Star | Kym Valentine | Nominated | |
| 2010 | Best Daytime Star | Jackie Woodburne | Nominated | |
| 2011 | Best Daytime Soap | Neighbours | Nominated | |
| 2011 | Best Daytime Star | Alan Fletcher | Nominated | |
| 2011 | Best Daytime Star | Ryan Moloney | Won | |
| 2011 | Best Daytime Star | Eve Morey | Nominated | |
| 2011 | Best Daytime Star | Jackie Woodburne | Nominated | |
| 2012 | Best Daytime Soap | Neighbours | Won | |
| 2012 | Best Daytime Star | Chris Milligan | Nominated | |
| 2012 | Best Daytime Star | Ryan Moloney | Won | |
| 2012 | Best Daytime Star | Eve Morey | Nominated | |
| 2012 | Best Daytime Star | Jackie Woodburne | Nominated | |
| 2013 | Best Daytime Soap | Neighbours | Nominated | |
| 2013 | Best Daytime Star | Scott Major | Nominated | |
| 2013 | Best Daytime Star | Ryan Moloney | Nominated | |
| 2013 | Best Daytime Star | Eve Morey | Nominated | |
| 2013 | Best Daytime Star | Jackie Woodburne | Nominated | |
| 2014 | Best Daytime Soap | Neighbours | Won | |
| 2014 | Best Daytime Star | Alan Fletcher | Nominated | |
| 2014 | Best Daytime Star | Chris Milligan | Nominated | |
| 2014 | Best Daytime Star | Jenna Rosenow | Nominated | |
| 2014 | Best Daytime Star | Jackie Woodburne | Nominated | |
| 2015 | Best Daytime Soap | Neighbours | Won | |
| 2015 | Best Daytime Star | Stefan Dennis | Nominated | |
| 2015 | Best Daytime Star | Tim Phillipps | Nominated | |
| 2015 | Best Daytime Star | Olympia Valance | Nominated | |
| 2015 | Best Daytime Star | Jackie Woodburne | Won | |
| 2016 | Best Daytime Soap | Neighbours | Won | |
| 2016 | Best Daytime Star | Rebekah Elmaloglou | Nominated | |
| 2016 | Best Daytime Star | Alan Fletcher | Won | |
| 2016 | Best Daytime Star | Scott McGregor | Nominated | |
| 2016 | Best Daytime Star | Olympia Valance | Nominated | |
| 2017 | Best Daytime Soap | Neighbours | Won | |
| 2017 | Best Daytime Star | Rebekah Elmaloglou | Nominated | |
| 2017 | Best Daytime Star | Stefan Dennis | Nominated | |
| 2017 | Best Daytime Star | Ryan Moloney | Nominated | |
| 2017 | Best Daytime Star | Eve Morey | Nominated | |
| 2018 | Best Daytime Soap | Neighbours | Nominated | |
| 2018 | Best Daytime Star | Alan Fletcher | Nominated | |
| 2018 | Best Daytime Star | Mavournee Hazel | Nominated | |
| 2018 | Best Daytime Star | Matt Wilson | Nominated | |
| 2018 | Best Daytime Star | Jackie Woodburne | Nominated | |
| 2019 | Best Daytime Soap | Neighbours | Won | |
| 2019 | Best Daytime Star | Jodi Anasta | Nominated | |
| 2019 | Best Daytime Star | Rob Mills | Nominated | |
| 2019 | Best Daytime Star | Ryan Moloney | Won | |
| 2019 | Best Daytime Star | April Rose Pengilly | Nominated | |
| 2020 | Best Daytime Soap | Neighbours | Won | |
| 2020 | Best Daytime Star | Stefan Dennis | Won | |
| 2020 | Best Daytime Star | Alan Fletcher | Nominated | |
| 2020 | Best Daytime Star | Georgie Stone | Nominated | |
| 2020 | Best Daytime Star | Jackie Woodburne | Nominated | |
| 2021 | Best Daytime Soap | Neighbours | Won | |
| 2021 | Best Daytime Star | Charlotte Chimes | Nominated | |
| 2021 | Best Daytime Star | Takaya Honda | Nominated | |
| 2021 | Best Daytime Star | April Rose Pengilly | Won | |
| 2021 | Best Daytime Star | Matt Wilson | Nominated | |
| 2022 | Best Daytime Soap | Neighbours | Won | |
| 2022 | Best Daytime Star | Stefan Dennis | Won | |
| 2022 | Best Daytime Star | Rebekah Elmaloglou | Nominated | |
| 2022 | Best Daytime Star | Georgie Stone | Nominated | |
| 2022 | Best Daytime Star | Benny Turland | Nominated | |
| 2024 | Best Daytime Soap | Neighbours | Won | |
| 2024 | Best Daytime Star | Majella Davis | Nominated | |
| 2024 | Best Daytime Star | Rebekah Elmaloglou | Nominated | |
| 2024 | Best Daytime Star | Ryan Moloney | Won | |
| 2024 | Best Daytime Star | Matt Wilson | Nominated | |
| 2025 | Best Daytime Star | Lucinda Armstrong Hall | Nominated | |
| 2025 | Best Daytime Star | Stefan Dennis | Won | |
| 2025 | Best Daytime Star | Annie Jones | Nominated | |
| 2025 | Best Daytime Star | Xavier Molyneux | Nominated | |
| 2025 | Outstanding Achievement (Team) | The cast and crew of Neighbours | Won | |

== Logie Awards ==
Neighbours is the second most successful recipient of Logie Awards, having won thirty-one Logies to date. Only Home and Away, has more awards with forty-seven. At the Logie Awards, Neighbours has won Most Popular Drama Series two times in 1987 and 1988, with a further nine nominations (2004, 2005, 2006, 2007, 2008, 2009, 2010, 2011 and 2019). 2019 also saw Neighbours nominated for Most Outstanding Drama Series, a category first for the thirty-five year old series. The show was inducted into the Logie Hall of Fame in 2005. In 1988, Kylie Minogue became the youngest person, at nineteen, to be awarded a Gold Logie.

| Year | Category | Nominee | Result | Ref |
|---|---|---|---|---|
| 1986 | Most Popular New Talent | Peter O'Brien | Won | |
| 1986 | Most Popular Program (Victoria) | Neighbours | Won | |
| 1987 | Most Popular Actor | Peter O'Brien | Won | |
| 1987 | Most Popular Actor | Jason Donovan | Nominated | |
| 1987 | Most Popular Actress | Kylie Minogue | Won | |
| 1987 | Most Popular Actress | Elaine Smith | Nominated | |
| 1987 | Most Popular Drama Series | Neighbours | Won | |
| 1987 | Most Popular New Talent | Jason Donovan | Won | |
| 1987 | Most Popular New Talent | Kylie Minogue | Nominated | |
| 1987 | Most Popular Program (Victoria) | Neighbours | Won | |
| 1988 | Most Popular Personality (Gold) | Kylie Minogue | Won | |
| 1988 | Most Popular Personality (Gold) | Jason Donovan | Nominated | |
| 1988 | Most Popular Actor | Jason Donovan | Won | |
| 1988 | Most Popular Actor | Craig McLachlan | Nominated | |
| 1988 | Most Popular Actress | Annie Jones | Nominated | |
| 1988 | Most Popular Actress | Kylie Minogue | Won | |
| 1988 | Most Popular Drama Series | Neighbours | Won | |
| 1988 | Most Popular New Talent | Annie Jones | Nominated | |
| 1988 | Most Popular Personality (Victoria) | Kylie Minogue | Won | |
| 1988 | Most Popular Program (Victoria) | Neighbours | Won | |
| 1989 | Most Popular Personality (Gold) | Jason Donovan | Nominated | |
| 1989 | Most Popular Personality (Gold) | Craig McLachlan | Nominated | |
| 1989 | Most Popular Personality (Gold) | Kylie Minogue | Nominated | |
| 1989 | Most Popular Actor | Jason Donovan | Nominated | |
| 1989 | Most Popular Actor | Craig McLachlan | Won | |
| 1989 | Most Popular Actress | Annie Jones | Won | |
| 1989 | Most Popular Actress | Kylie Minogue | Nominated | |
| 1989 | Most Popular New Talent | Rachel Friend | Nominated | |
| 1989 | Most Popular Series | Neighbours | Won | |
| 1989 | Most Popular Program (Victoria) | Neighbours | Won | |
| 1990 | Most Popular Personality (Gold) | Craig McLachlan | Won | |
| 1990 | Most Popular Actor | Craig McLachlan | Won | |
| 1990 | Most Popular Actress | Rachel Friend | Won | |
| 1990 | Most Popular Series | Neighbours | Won | |
| 1990 | Most Popular Program (Victoria) | Neighbours | Won | |
| 1991 | Most Popular Program (Victoria) | Neighbours | Won | |
| 1991 | Most Popular Series | Neighbours | Nominated | |
| 1992 | Most Popular Program (Victoria) | Neighbours | Won | |
| 1993 | Most Popular Actor | Scott Michaelson | Nominated | |
| 1994 | Most Popular New Talent | Kimberley Davies | Nominated | |
| 1996 | Most Popular Series | Neighbours | Nominated | |
| 1998 | Most Popular New Talent | Brooke Satchwell | Won | |
| 1998 | Most Popular Actor | Jesse Spencer | Nominated | |
| 1998 | Most Popular Series | Neighbours | Nominated | |
| 1999 | Most Popular New Male Talent | Daniel MacPherson | Won | |
| 1999 | Most Popular Actor | Jesse Spencer | Nominated | |
| 1999 | Most Popular Actress | Brooke Satchwell | Nominated | |
| 2000 | Most Popular New Female Talent | Holly Valance | Nominated | |
| 2001 | Most Popular Actor | Daniel MacPherson | Nominated | |
| 2001 | Most Popular New Female Talent | Madeleine West | Nominated | |
| 2002 | Most Popular New Male Talent | Blair McDonough | Nominated | |
| 2003 | Most Popular New Male Talent | Patrick Harvey | Won | |
| 2003 | Most Popular New Male Talent | Jay Bunyan | Nominated | |
| 2003 | Most Popular New Female Talent | Delta Goodrem | Won | |
| 2003 | Most Popular New Female Talent | Michelle Ang | Nominated | |
| 2004 | Most Popular Personality (Gold) | Delta Goodrem | Nominated | |
| 2004 | Most Popular Actress | Delta Goodrem | Nominated | |
| 2004 | Most Popular New Female Talent | Stephanie McIntosh | Nominated | |
| 2004 | Most Popular Australian Drama Series | Neighbours | Nominated | |
| 2004 | Most Popular Australian Program | Neighbours | Nominated | |
| 2005 | Most Popular New Female Talent | Natalie Blair | Won | |
| 2005 | Most Popular New Male Talent | Ben Nicholas | Nominated | |
| 2005 | Logie Hall of Fame | Neighbours | Won | |
| 2005 | Most Popular Drama Series | Neighbours | Nominated | |
| 2006 | Most Popular Personality (Gold) | Natalie Bassingthwaighte | Nominated | |
| 2006 | Most Popular Actress | Natalie Bassingthwaighte | Nominated | |
| 2006 | Most Popular New Male Talent | Daniel O'Connor | Nominated | |
| 2006 | Most Popular New Female Talent | Pippa Black | Nominated | |
| 2006 | Most Popular Drama Series | Neighbours | Nominated | |
| 2007 | Most Popular Personality (Gold) | Natalie Blair | Nominated | |
| 2007 | Most Popular Actress | Natalie Blair | Nominated | |
| 2007 | Most Popular Actress | Natalie Bassingthwaighte | Nominated | |
| 2007 | Most Popular New Male Talent | Ben Lawson | Nominated | |
| 2007 | Most Popular Drama Series | Neighbours | Nominated | |
| 2008 | Most Popular Personality (Gold) | Natalie Blair | Nominated | |
| 2008 | Most Popular Actress | Natalie Blair | Nominated | |
| 2008 | Most Popular New Male Talent | Sam Clark | Nominated | |
| 2008 | Most Popular New Female Talent | Adelaide Kane | Nominated | |
| 2008 | Most Popular Drama Series | Neighbours | Nominated | |
| 2009 | Most Popular Personality (Gold) | Ian Smith | Nominated | |
| 2009 | Most Popular Actor | Ian Smith | Nominated | |
| 2009 | Most Popular New Male Talent | Dean Geyer | Nominated | |
| 2009 | Most Popular New Female Talent | Margot Robbie | Nominated | |
| 2009 | Most Popular Drama Series | Neighbours | Nominated | |
| 2010 | Most Popular Drama Series | Neighbours | Nominated | |
| 2010 | Most Popular New Female Talent | Ashleigh Brewer | Nominated | |
| 2011 | Most Popular Drama Series | Neighbours | Nominated | |
| 2011 | Most Popular Actress | Margot Robbie | Nominated | |
| 2012 | Most Popular New Male Talent | James Mason | Nominated | |
| 2015 | Most Popular New Talent | Olympia Valance | Nominated | |
| 2019 | Most Popular Personality (Gold) | Eve Morey | Nominated | |
| 2019 | Most Popular Actor | Ryan Moloney | Nominated | |
| 2019 | Most Popular Actress | Eve Morey | Nominated | |
| 2019 | Most Popular Drama | Neighbours | Nominated | |
| 2019 | Most Outstanding Drama | Neighbours | Nominated | |
| 2019 | Most Popular New Talent | Bonnie Anderson | Nominated | |

== National Television Awards ==
The National Television Awards are a British television awards ceremony. The NTAs results are voted for by the general public and the award categories are given the title of Most Popular instead of Best.

| Year | Category | Nominee | Result | Ref |
|---|---|---|---|---|
| 1995 | Most Popular Actor | Dan Falzon | Nominated | |
| 1995 | Most Popular Actor | Bruce Samazan | Nominated | |
| 1995 | Most Popular Actress | Anne Haddy | Nominated | |
| 1995 | Most Popular Actress | Kimberly Davies | Nominated | |
| 1995 | Most Popular Newcomer | Richard Grieve | Nominated | |
| 1995 | Most Popular Newcomer | Eliza Szonert | Nominated | |
| 1995 | Most Popular Serial Drama | Neighbours | Nominated | |
| 1996 | Most Popular Serial Drama | Neighbours | Nominated | |
| 1997 | Most Popular Serial Drama | Neighbours | Nominated | |
| 2000 | Most Popular Daytime Programme | Neighbours | Nominated | |
| 2001 | Most Popular Daytime Programme | Neighbours | Nominated | |
| 2002 | Most Popular Daytime Programme | Neighbours | Nominated | |
| 2004 | Most Popular Daytime Programme | Neighbours | Nominated | |
| 2005 | Most Popular Daytime Programme | Neighbours | Nominated | |
| 2006 | Most Popular Daytime Programme | Neighbours | Nominated | |
| 2022 | Serial drama | Neighbours | Nominated | |

== Nickelodeon Australian Kids' Choice Awards ==
The Nickelodeon Australian Kids' Choice Awards is an annual awards show usually held during October or November. It is televised and the winners are chosen and voted for by children.

| Year | Category | Nominee | Result | Ref |
|---|---|---|---|---|
| 2006 | Fave Hottie (female) | Stephanie McIntosh | Won | |
| 2006 | Fave Hottie (female) | Natalie Bassingthwaighte | Nominated | |
| 2006 | Fave Hottie (male) | Dan O'Connor | Nominated | |
| 2006 | Fave TV Star | Stephanie McIntosh | Nominated | |
| 2006 | Fave TV Show | Neighbours | Nominated | |
| 2007 | Fave TV Star | Caitlin Stasey | Nominated | |
| 2007 | Fave Hottie | Natalie Bassingthwaighte | Nominated | |
| 2008 | Fave Drama Show | Neighbours | Nominated | |
| 2008 | Fave TV Star | Dean Geyer | Nominated | |
| 2009 | Fave Drama Show | Neighbours | Nominated | |
| 2009 | Fave Aussie Hottie | Dean Geyer | Won | |
| 2009 | Fave Aussie Hottie | Margot Robbie | Nominated | |

== Penguin Awards ==
The Penguin Awards were introduced in the late 1950s by the Australian Television Society to help promote "excellence within the industry".

| Year | Category | Nominee | Result | Ref |
|---|---|---|---|---|
| 1986 | Best Drama Series | Neighbours | Won | |
| 1987 | Best Performance by an Actress in a Series or Serial | Anne Charleston | Won | |
| 1987 | Best Sustained Performance by an Actress in a Series | Anne Haddy | Won | |
| 1989 | Best Drama Serial | Neighbours | Won | |
| 1989 | Best Actress in a Drama Serial | Linda Hartley-Clark | Won | |

== People's Choice Awards ==
| Year | Category | Nominee | Result | Ref |
|---|---|---|---|---|
| 1999 | Favourite Teen Idol | Brooke Satchwell | Won | |
| 1999 | Favourite Teen Idol | Jesse Spencer | Nominated | |

== Rose d'Or Awards ==
The Rose d'Or is a television awards festival held in Switzerland. The awards focus on entertainment-based programmes.

| Year | Category | Nominee | Result | Ref |
|---|---|---|---|---|
| 2004 | Best Male Performance in a Soap | Ryan Moloney | Nominated | |
| 2005 | Best Female Performance in a Soap | Jackie Woodburne | Nominated | |

== Soap Extra Awards ==
The Soap Extra Awards are hosted by TV Week Soap Extra magazine.

| Year | Category | Nominee | Result | Ref |
|---|---|---|---|---|
| 2014 | Favourite Newcomer | Meyne Wyatt | Won | |
| 2014 | Most Explosive Guest Star | Sheree Murphy | Won | |
| 2014 | Most Topical Storyline | Chris and Josh's coward punch storyline | Won | |
| 2014 | Most Out-of-This-World Storyline | Bailey's Space Camp ambitions | Won | |

== TV Tonight Awards ==
The TV Tonight Awards are awarded by website TV Tonight.

| Year | Category | Nominee | Result | Ref |
|---|---|---|---|---|
| 2007 | Best Drama (Australian) | Neighbours | Nominated | |
| 2007 | Most Underrated Performer | Jackie Woodburne | Won | |
| 2008 | Show Most in Need of Retirement / Axing | Neighbours | Nominated | |
| 2009 | Worst Show (Australian) | Neighbours | Nominated | |
| 2009 | Most Underrated Performer | Jackie Woodburne | Nominated | |
| 2010 | Most Underrated Performer | Jackie Woodburne | Nominated | |
| 2011 | Most Underrated Performer | Jackie Woodburne | Won | |
| 2012 | Most Underrated Performer | Jackie Woodburne | Won | |
| 2013 | Most Underrated Performer | Jackie Woodburne | Nominated | |
| 2014 | Most Underrated Performer | Jackie Woodburne | Nominated | |

== TV Week and Soap Extra #OMGAwards ==
| Year | Category | Nominee | Result | Ref |
|---|---|---|---|---|
| 2015 | Favourite Show | Neighbours | Nominated | |
| 2015 | Favourite Couple | Paige Smith and Mark Brennan | Nominated | |
| 2015 | Favourite Couple | Karl and Susan | Nominated | |
| 2015 | Favourite Couple | Toadie and Sonya | Nominated | |
| 2015 | Best Storyline | Toadie's paralysis | Nominated | |
| 2015 | Best Wedding | Daniel Robinson and Amber Turner | Nominated | |
| 2015 | Best Love Triangle | Mark, Paige and Tyler Brennan | Nominated | |
| 2015 | Best Shock Kiss | Daniel and Imogen Willis | Nominated | |
| 2015 | Best Shock Kiss | Paul Robinson and Naomi Canning | Nominated | |
| 2015 | Best Villain | Paul Robinson | Nominated | |
| 2015 | Best BFFs | Imogen and Amber | Nominated | |
| 2015 | Best Abs | Mark Brennan | Nominated | |
| 2015 | Best Abs | Tyler Brennan | Nominated | |
| 2015 | Best Abs | Aaron Brennan | Nominated | |

== Other awards ==
| Year | Award | Category | Nominee | Result | Ref |
|---|---|---|---|---|---|
| 1999 | British Soap Awards | Best Foreign Soap | Neighbours | Nominated | |
| 2000 | British Soap Awards | Best Foreign Soap | Neighbours | Nominated | |
| 2000 | Inside Soap Awards (AU) | Best Aussie Actor | Dan Paris | Won | |
| 2001 | TV Quick Awards | Best Soap | Neighbours | Nominated | |
| 2003 | Monte-Carlo Television Festival | Outstanding Contribution To International Television | Reg Grundy | Won | |
| 2011 | Seoul International Drama Awards | Best Series | Neighbours | Nominated | |
| 2014 | Equity Ensemble Awards | Outstanding Performance by a Drama Series Ensemble | ^{See below} | Nominated | |
| 2015 | IKEA Awards | Best Carpenter | Tom Oliver | Won | |
| 2015 | Equity Ensemble Awards | Outstanding Performance by a Drama Series Ensemble | ^{See below} | Nominated | |
| 2020 | RadioTimes.com Soap Awards | Best Actor | Rob Mills | Won | |
| 2020 | RadioTimes.com Soap Awards | Best Actress | Jackie Woodburne | Won | |
| 2020 | RadioTimes.com Soap Awards | Best Newcomer | Jemma Donovan | Won | |
| 2020 | RadioTimes.com Soap Awards | Best Soap | Neighbours | Won | |
| 2020 | RadioTimes.com Soap Awards | Best Storyline | Finn's Revenge | Won | |
| 2021 | RadioTimes.com Awards | Best Soap | Neighbours | Won | |
| 2022 | TV Choice Awards | Best Soap | Neighbours | Nominated | |
| 2024 | Casting Guild of Australia | Achievement in Casting | Neighbours – Thea McLeod | Nominated | |
| 2025 | TV Times Awards | Favourite Soap | Neighbours | Pending | |
| 2025 | TV Times Awards | Favourite Animal Star | Trevor | Pending | |

== Notes ==
^2014 Equity Ensemble Award nominees for "Most Outstanding Performance by an Ensemble in a Drama Series": Morgan Baker, Harley Bonner, Ashleigh Brewer, Josef Brown, Stefan Dennis, Rebekah Elmaloglou, Alan Fletcher, Kip Gamblin, Taylor Glockner, Saskia Hampele, Ariel Kaplan, Kate Kendall, Calen Mackenzie, Scott Major, Colette Mann, James Mason, Chris Milligan, Ryan Moloney, Eve Morey, Tom Oliver, Jenna Rosenow, Alin Sumarwata and Jackie Woodburne

^2015 Equity Ensemble Award nominees for "Most Outstanding Performance by an Ensemble in a Drama Series": Alan Fletcher, Jackie Woodburne, Scarlett Anderson, Harley Bonner, Josef Brown, Travis Burns, Stefan Dennis, Rebekah Elmaloglou, Kip Gamblin, Saskia Hampele, Ariel Kaplan, Kate Kendall, Calen Mackenzie, Colette Mann, James Mason, Scott McGregor, Chris Milligan, Ryan Moloney, Eve Morey, Tom Oliver, Morgana O'Reilly, Tim Phillipps, Jenna Rosenow, Olympia Valance and Meyne Wyatt
