= Heat (2023 TV series) =

- Genre: Action-thriller
- Created by: Jason Herbison
- Written by: Jason Herbison; Margaret Wilson; Anthony Ellis
- Directed by: Kate Kendall
- Starring: Danny Dyer; Darren McMullen; Pia Miranda; Jane Allsop
- Composers: Cornel Wilczek; Pascal Babare; Thomas Rouch
- Country of origin: Australia
- Original language: English
- No. of seasons: 1
- No. of episodes: 4

Production
- Executive producer: Jason Herbison
- Producer: Natalie Mandel
- Production location: Melbourne
- Cinematography: Tony Gardiner
- Editor: Kylie Robertson
- Running time: 60 minutes
- Production company: Fremantle Australia

Original release
- Network: Channel 5
- Release: 11 July – 14 July 2023
- Network: Network 10
- Release: 4 October – 25 October 2023

Heat is a British-Australian action-thriller television series created by Jason Herbison and directed by Kate Kendall. It was broadcast over four consecutive days from 11 July 2023 on Channel 5 in the UK, and from 4 October 2023 on Network 10 in Australia. The plot focuses on two families as they take a joint vacation amidst the bushfire season. Heat stars Danny Dyer, Darren McMullen, Pia Miranda, and Jane Allsop. It was filmed in Melbourne and rural Victoria in November and December 2022.

== Plot ==
Amidst the Australian bushfire season, Steve (Dyer) and Brad's (McMullen) families meet up for their annual vacation in the Victorian highlands, where secrets and lies are revealed.

== Cast ==
- Danny Dyer as Steve Cameron
- Darren McMullen as Brad Fisher
- Pia Miranda as Sarah Cameron
- Jane Allsop as Louise Fisher
- Matia Marks as Mia Cameron
- Richie Morris as Jet Calloway
- Matteo Annetta as Tom Cameron
- Hunter Hayden as Kip Fisher
- Olympia Valance as Sergeant Demi Angelos

== Production ==
The series was commissioned along with Riptide, following the success of Lie With Me (2021). Both series were commissioned for Channel 5, and made by Fremantle Australia in partnership with Australia's Network Ten. Heat was created by Jason Herbison and produced by Natalie Mandel. The scripts have been written by Herbison, Margaret Wilson, and Anthony Ellis. Herbison stated: "I'm excited to partner with 10 and 5 once again for this tense family thriller, and ecstatic to have such an accomplished cast on board to bring it to life, along with Kate Kendall directing and Natalie Mandel driving the production." Commissioning editor at Channel 5 and Paramount+, Greg Barnett described the series as "a suspenseful and nail-biting thriller".

The cast was announced in November 2022. British actor Danny Dyer plays Steve Cameron, an ex-pat who moved to Australia with his best friend when they were young. Heat marks Dyer's first project since his departure from soap opera EastEnders. At the time of his casting, he stated: "Can't wait to get amongst this beautiful piece of work in Australia. I've always been intrigued about working there. It's my first gig since my long stint at EastEnders. Really powerful dark script and a strong Australian cast and crew. Let's have it!!!" Dyer flew out to Australia almost immediately after finishing up on EastEnders. He said that he had wanted to work in the sun, but the moment he arrived in Melbourne, it rained every day. Dyer was asked to put on an Australian accent for the role. He joked "They did ask me to be Australian but I said, 'Let's just calm down a little bit, let's not get carried away...'" He described the script as "really clever" and he was proud to have been part of the show.

Scottish actor Darren McMullen plays Steve's best friend Brad Fisher, who emigrated to Australia with him. Pia Miranda is Steve's Australian wife Sarah Cameron, while Matteo Annetta plays their son Tom and Matia Marks plays their daughter Mia, who suspects her father of having an affair. Brad's wife Louise is played by Jane Allsop and Hunter Hayden is their son Kip. Other cast members include Olympia Valance as Sergeant Angelos and Richie Morris as Mia's boyfriend Jet Calloway.

Heat is directed by Kate Kendall. Production on the four-part series began in mid-November 2022, and concluded in early December. It was filmed on-location in Melbourne, Plenty Gorge Park, and rural Victoria. The production received funding from VicScreen. The first promotional pictures from the series were released in February, followed by a teaser trailer on 1 March. The series began airing from 11 July 2023 in the UK. Heat will be broadcast on Network 10 in Australia from 4 October 2023.

== Episodes ==
No.	Title	Directed by	Written by	Original release date	UK viewers (millions)
1	"Episode 1"	Kate Kendall	Jason Herbison	11 July 2023	N/A
Steve Cameron and his family meet up with his friends Brad and Louise for their annual get-together in Victoria. Due to his secretive behaviour, Steve's daughter Mia is convinced her father is having an affair, but he later reveals to Brad that he has lost his family's life savings due to bad investments and has not told his wife, Sarah. Brad offers Steve the money to pay off a loan shark. Mia's boyfriend Jet turns up and she sneaks off to see him, but her brother Tom catches them together and tells Steve. He explains to Brad that Jet attacked Tom, leaving him with a broken wrist. Mia confronts Steve for threatening Jet with the police. Jet leaves, but at the crossroads he is told by Sergeant Angelos that the road to Sydney is closing due to bushfires. He returns to the house to tell everyone and is invited to stay the night. This worries Sarah and it emerges that she and Brad are having an emotional affair.
2	"Episode 2"	Kate Kendall	Margaret Wilson	12 July 2023	N/A
The police inform Brad that the house is in no immediate danger from the bushfires. Sarah tells Brad that their affair has to stop. Mia openly accuses her father of having an affair, but he tells Sarah that it is not true and she believes him. She then asks that he goes easier on Jet for Mia's sake. Tom keeps a map detailing the locations of the bushfires and Kip tries to wind him up. Louise notices $500,000 is due to leave her and Brad's bank account, leading Steve to tell Sarah about his debts. Louise worries about the encroaching bushfire, but Brad assures her that it will rain before it gets near the house. During the night, Tom notices Kip leaving their shared bedroom. In the morning, Jet explains to Steve that he is trying to turn his life around, but Steve tells Mia she can do better. Someone later records Jet and Mia having sex. Louise asks to see the bushfire plan, but soon realises that Brad has lied about getting it done. Kip questions Jet about the night Tom got hurt, and he later agrees to show Tom where he goes at night. Brad visits Sarah's room and convinces her that they should be together. He then goes to his office where he watches several video clips of Mia.
3	"Episode 3"	Kate Kendall	Anthony Ellis	13 July 2023	N/A
A flashback shows Brad spying on Mia and Jet, before he flees the Cameron's home and knocks Tom to the floor injuring him. In the present, Brad takes Mia to the lookout above the river, where she tells him that she almost messed up her relationship with Jet due to a lie. Steve get confirmation that the loan shark has received his first payment, but when Sarah learns that they made threats against the family, she asks for a divorce. Kip shows Tom his marijuana plants in the shed. Brad and Sarah consummate their relationship and work out how to tell everyone. The smoke from the fires gets closer and the roads are closed, but Brad keeps assuring the group that everything is fine and he has spoken to a friend at the SES. Brad gets Mia to reveal the lie she told Jet, which he deliberately lets slip while talking with Jet. Louise informs Brad that after the danger has passed, she is leaving him. Jet reveals to Brad that when he originally went to leave, the road was not closed and that he came back for Mia. Tom sees Sarah kissing Brad and he storms off to smoke marijuana with Kip. He later catches Brad recording Mia and Jet and he runs off into the bush pursued by Brad.
4	"Episode 4"	Kate Kendall	Jason Herbison	14 July 2023	N/A
Brad finally agrees that the group need to evacuate. He lies about having seen Tom and encourages Jet to take his car and search for him, having cut the fuel line in order to strand him. Kip reveals that he and Tom were smoking marijuana, so Steve and Sarah go looking for him. Sarah tells Steve about the affair with Brad, as she believes that is why Tom is missing, and Steve confronts Brad in front of everyone. Brad tells them a helicopter is being sent out, but only for four people and he tries to get Mia to join his family. Kip and Louise wait in the shed and Kip asks whether they can trust Brad, as he lied about Tom. Steve breaks down and Sarah apologises and says she still loves him. She finds Tom and he tells her the truth about Brad. Sarah confronts Brad about his obsession with Mia and he kills her. Jet makes it to town and informs the police sergeant that the group need evacuating. Mia learns of Brad's obsession and he chases her through the house, until Steve comes to her rescue. Steve finds Sarah's body and then bludgeons Brad to death, as Louise watches on, having learned everything. The group are rescued, and Steve, Louise and Jet agree to keep what really happened a secret.

== Reception ==
Heat received mixed reviews. James Jackson of The Times gave the series three out of five stars, and branded it "the latest thriller to rot your brain over four nights." The Guardian's Hollie Richardson observed "There is something about Danny Dyer's cockney-geezer charisma that makes this otherwise mediocre four-part thriller worth a try."

Gerard Gilbert from the I also gave Heat three stars, calling it "laughably unsubtle" but "surprisingly moreish – tightly plotted, with the added dimension of an encroaching bush fire." Gilbert noted that due to Dyer's former soap opera role, he comes across as "a bit stiff to start with, like he's trying this new character on for size after so long playing the same person week in, week out." Gilbert found the series to be "a diverting ride with a refreshingly different and (given how the climate crisis is ravaging Oz) topical setting."

== See also ==
- List of Australian television series
