= 55th AWGIE Awards =

Award ceremony for writing of 2022

The 55th annual AWGIE Awards, presented by the Australian Writers' Guild, took place on 17 November 2022 at the Seymour Centre, Sydney. It honoured the best writing in film, television, audio, stage, web series, and gaming of 2022. The nominations were announced on 29 September 2022.

== Winners and nominees ==
Winners are listed first and highlighted in boldface.

**Major AWGIE Award**
- **Girl Like You – Frances Elliott and Samantha Marlowe**

=== Film ===
**Feature Film – Original**
- **Blaze – Del Kathryn Barton and Huna Amweero**
  - How to Please a Woman – Renée Webster
  - Sissy – Hannah Barlow and Kane Senes
  - Sweet As – Jub Clerc and Steve Rodgers
**Feature Film – Adapted**
- **Mrs. Harris Goes to Paris – Keith Thompson with Carroll Cartwright, Anthony Fabian, and Olivia Hetreed; based on the novel Mrs. 'Arris Goes to Paris by Paul Gallico**
  - The Drover's Wife: The Legend of Molly Johnson – Leah Purcell; based on her play and the short story by Henry Lawson
  - The Stranger – Thomas M. Wright; based on the book The Sting: The Undercover Operation That Caught Daniel Morcombe's Killer by Kate Kyriacou
**Short Film**
- **The Moths Will Eat Them Up – Tanya Modini**
  - Pasifika Drift – Natasha Henry
  - Snapshot – Becki Bouchier
  - When the Sky Was Blue – Rae Choi

=== Television ===
**Television – Serial**
- **Home and Away: Episode 7742 – Louise Bowes (Seven Network)**
  - Neighbours: Episode 8654 – Jessica Paine (Network 10)
  - Neighbours: Episode 8801 – Emma J. Steele (Network 10)
**Television – Series**
- **The Newsreader: "No More Lies" – Kim Ho and Michael Lucas (ABC)**
  - Bump: "AITA (Am I the Arsehole)" – Jessica Tuckwell (Stan)
  - Firebite: "I Wanna Go Home" – Kodie Bedford (AMC+)
  - Heartbreak High: "Map B**ch" – Hannah Carroll Chapman (Netflix)
  - The Newsreader: "A Step Closer to the Madness" – Niki Aken (ABC)
  - Total Control: "Season 2, Episode 2" – Pip Karmel (ABC)
**Television – Limited Series**
- **Fires – Tony Ayres, Belinda Chayko, Anya Beyersdorf, Steven McGregor, and Jacquelin Perske with Mirrah Foulkes (ABC)**
  - Lie with Me – Jason Herbison and Margaret Wilson with Anthony Ellis (Network 10)
**Comedy – Situation or Narrative**
- **Spreadsheet: "Chlamydia & Nits" – Kala Ellis (Paramount+)**
  - How to Stay Married: "Keyboard Warriors" – Nick Musgrove (Network 10)
  - Metro Sexual: "Martha Bradbury" – Henry Boffin with Nicholas Kraak (Nine Network)
**Comedy – Sketch or Light Entertainment**
- **The Feed: "Comedy Sketches, 2021" – Ben Jenkins, Alex Lee, Jenna Owen, Vidya Rajan, and Vic Zerbst (SBS)**
  - Gruen: "Punts" – Sophie Braham and James Colley with Cameron James, Bec Melrose, and Mark Sutton (ABC)

=== Children's Television ===
**Children's Television – 'P' Classification (Preschool – Under 5 Years)**
- **Little J & Big Cuz: "Levi Learns" – Samuel Nuggin-Paynter (NITV)**
  - Beep and Mort: "Beep's Home" – Charlotte Rose Hamlyn (ABC Kids)
  - Little J & Big Cuz: "Serpent's Eye" – Dot West (NITV)
  - Little J & Big Cuz: "Shelter" – Adam Thompson (NITV)
**Children's Television – 'C' Classification (Children's – 5-14 Years)**
- **The Strange Chores: "Walk Wolfman" – Luke Tierney (ABC Me)**
  - The PM's Daughter: "Episode 4" – Angela McDonald (ABC Me)
  - The PM's Daughter: "Episode 8" – Lou Sanz (ABC Me)
  - Rock Island Mysteries: "A Young Mystery" – Marisa Nathar (Nickelodeon)

=== Audio ===
**Audio – Fiction**
- **Untrue Romance: "Call You Back" – Tommy Murphy**
  - The Bazura Project's Radio Free Cinema: "Herzog's Adventures in Wernerland" – Lee Zachariah with Shannon Marinko
  - The Fitzroy Diaries: "Episode 1", "Episode 3", "Episode 7", and "Episode 8" – Lorin Clarke
  - The Great Mantini – Simon Luckhurst
  - Sunshadow: "Episode 1", "Episode 9", and "Episode 10" – Phil Enchelmaier and Bronwen Noakes
**Audio – Non-Fiction**
- **The Phantom Never Dies: "Fantomen" – Maria Lewis**

=== Stage ===
**Stage – Original**
- **Horizon – Maxine Mellor**
  - Dogged – Andrea James and Catherine Ryan
**Stage – Adapted**
- **My Father's Wars – Elaine Acworth; based on her podcast series**
  - Animal Farm – Van Badham; based on the novella by George Orwell
  - Playing Beatie Bow – Kate Mulvany; based on the novel by Ruth Park
**Community and Youth Theatre**
- **Euphoria – Emily Steel**
  - Summer at Suspended Stone Camp – Madelaine Nunn
  - Very Happy Children With Bright and Wonderful Futures – Joshua Maxwell
**Theatre for Young Audience**
- **House – Dan Giovannoni**
  - Cactus – Madelaine Nunn
  - We Are the Mutable – Matthew Whittet

=== Other categories ===
**Animation**
- **Metropius: "Case #001" – Ally Burnham**
**Documentary – Public Broadcast (Including VOD) or Exhibition**
- **Girl Like You – Frances Elliott and Samantha Marlowe**
- **Ithaka – Ben Lawrence**
  - Beyond the Reef – Georgia Harrison
  - Big Deal – Craig Reucassel and Christiaan Van Vuuren
  - Peace Pilgrims – John Hughes
**Interactive Media and Gaming**
- **Sun Runners: "Radioactive Laser Eyes" – Zoe Pepper**
**Web Series and Other Non-Broadcast/Non-'Subscription Video on Demand' TV Short Works**
- **It's Fine, I'm Fine: "Poo Boy" – Jeanette Cronin**
  - A Beginner’s Guide to Grief: Segment 1: Denial, "Stung By A Thousand Bees" – Anna Lindner
  - All My Friends Are Racist: "Cancelled" – Kodie Bedford and Enoch Mailangi
  - Iggy & Ace: "Episode 3" and "Episode 4" – AB Morrison
  - The Power of the Dream: "Swimming" and "Weightlifting" – Alexandra Keddie and Bobbie-Jean Henning

=== Special awards ===
The following special awards were presented at the ceremony:

- David Williamson Prize for Excellence in Writing for Australian Theatre: Horizon – Maxine Mellor
- Australian Writers' Guild Life Membership: Mac Gudgeon
- Dorothy Crawford Award for Outstanding Contribution to the Profession and the Industry: Philip Dalkin
- Hector Crawford Award for Outstanding Contribution to the Craft as a Script Producer, Editor or Dramaturg: Peter Gawler
- Fred Parsons Award for Outstanding Contribution to Australian Comedy: Phil Lloyd and Trent O'Donnell
