= Episode 8055 (Neighbours) =

- Neighbours episode
- Episode no.: Episode 8055
- Directed by: Kate Kendall
- Written by: Ceinwen Langley
- Editing by: Kylie Robertson
- Original air date: 8 March 2019
- Running time: 22 minutes

Episode chronology
← Previous; Episode 8054	Next → Episode 8056

Episode 8055 of the Australian television soap opera Neighbours first aired on 10 Peach and Channel 5 on 8 March 2019. The episode was written by Ceinwen Langley and directed by Kate Kendall. It features an all female cast to mark International Women's Day. It is the first episode of Neighbours to star, be directed, written, edited, and produced by women—a first on Australian television. The plot centres around the female characters coming together to honour Sonya Rebecchi (Eve Morey) by completing her community initiatives, following her recent death. They also take part in a vlog in which they discuss their female heroes, while Elly Conway (Jodi Anasta) and Chloe Brennan (April Rose Pengilly) share a kiss.

Executive producer Jason Herbison raised the idea of doing something within the show that centred around International Women's Day in 2018. The episode celebrates the impact that Sonya Rebecchi had on the show and its characters. Kendall was honoured to be given the opportunity to direct the episode. In a change to the usual format, the characters are filmed talking to the camera one-on-one. Kendall pointed out how viewers rarely get to see the characters pausing and reflecting on things that do not advance the plot. Jackie Woodburne (Susan Kennedy) was pleased with the chance to explore the topics raised by International Women's Day in the episode, while producer Sara Richardson believed it would increase female screen representation at a local level. Towards the end of the episode, the bond between Elly and Chloe, which had been built up over a number of months, comes to a head as they share a kiss. Pengilly said her character is shocked by the development, which leads to repercussions in the weeks that follow, as Elly marries Chloe's brother.

Fellow soap opera Emmerdale also created an all-female episode for 8 March 2019, and Chloe Timms of Digital Spy said the special episodes were "a treat for viewers", provided excitement and freshness, and allowed the audience a chance to see female friendships and relationships in a more positive light, rather than through the usual love triangles and fights. Laura Brodnik of Mamamia called Episode 8055 a "pivotal TV moment". While Gia Moylan of Hit Network said Neighbours had broken more TV ground with the episode. It was used by critics as an example of how Neighbours reflected diversity and had become more progressive. Jackie Epstein from the Herald Sun named the episode as one of the serial's 35 most memorable moments.

== Plot ==
At Number 28 Ramsay Street, Susan Kennedy (Jackie Woodburne) and her niece Bea Nilsson (Bonnie Anderson) discuss Finn Kelly (Rob Mills), who has woken up from his coma with amnesia. Bea thinks Finn is faking it to stay out of jail, but Susan tells her to keep an open mind and reveals she once had retrograde amnesia. Across the road, Chloe Brennan (April Rose Pengilly) and Elly Conway (Jodi Anasta) try to contact Elly's fiancé Mark Brennan, who has left town ahead of their wedding and Sonya Rebecchi's (Eve Morey) memorial. Piper Willis (Mavournee Hazel) joins her mother Terese Willis (Rebekah Elmaloglou) at Lassiters Hotel to organise care packages for the local women's shelter based on Sonya's plans for International Women's Day. Piper reveals her plan to honour Sonya with a special vlog in which the women of Ramsay Street talk about their female heroes. Sheila Canning (Colette Mann) and Amy Williams (Zoe Cramond) agree to be in the vlog when they drop off donations. Elly fills Chloe in on the latest developments with Finn, while Chloe tells her that Mark has still not been found. Piper joins Susan and Bea to film their vlog interviews. Susan chooses Mary Wollstonecraft as her hero, while Bea chooses Wonder Woman. Piper interviews Dipi Rebecchi (Sharon Johal) and Yashvi Rebecchi (Olivia Junkeer), who choose Beyoncé and Moana Hope respectively.

At Number 24, Chloe tells Piper that she idolises Laverne Cox, while Elly picks Louisa Lawson. Elly then receives a text from Mark telling her the wedding is off. Piper returns home and tells Terese how upset Elly is. Terese points out that grief makes people behave irrationally. She helps Piper film the final segment of her vlog in which Piper declares that Sonya is the woman who made the biggest impact on her. Meanwhile, Chloe tries to comfort Elly and leaves her brother a voicemail demanding an explanation. Elly declares that she is done chasing Mark, and she and Chloe open a bottle of wine. Chloe reveals that her former girlfriend said no one would love her because she is going to die early from Huntington's. Elly tells her that she deserves to be loved unconditionally. At Number 28, Susan tells Bea that she needs to see Finn that night because he is all she can think about. Chloe and Elly continue drinking. Chloe tells Elly that she thought the idea of spending her life with one person was insane until she fell in love with her. Chloe says she knows that Elly does not feel the same way, but then Elly kisses Chloe and when Chloe asks her if she is sure, Elly nods and kisses her again.

== Production ==
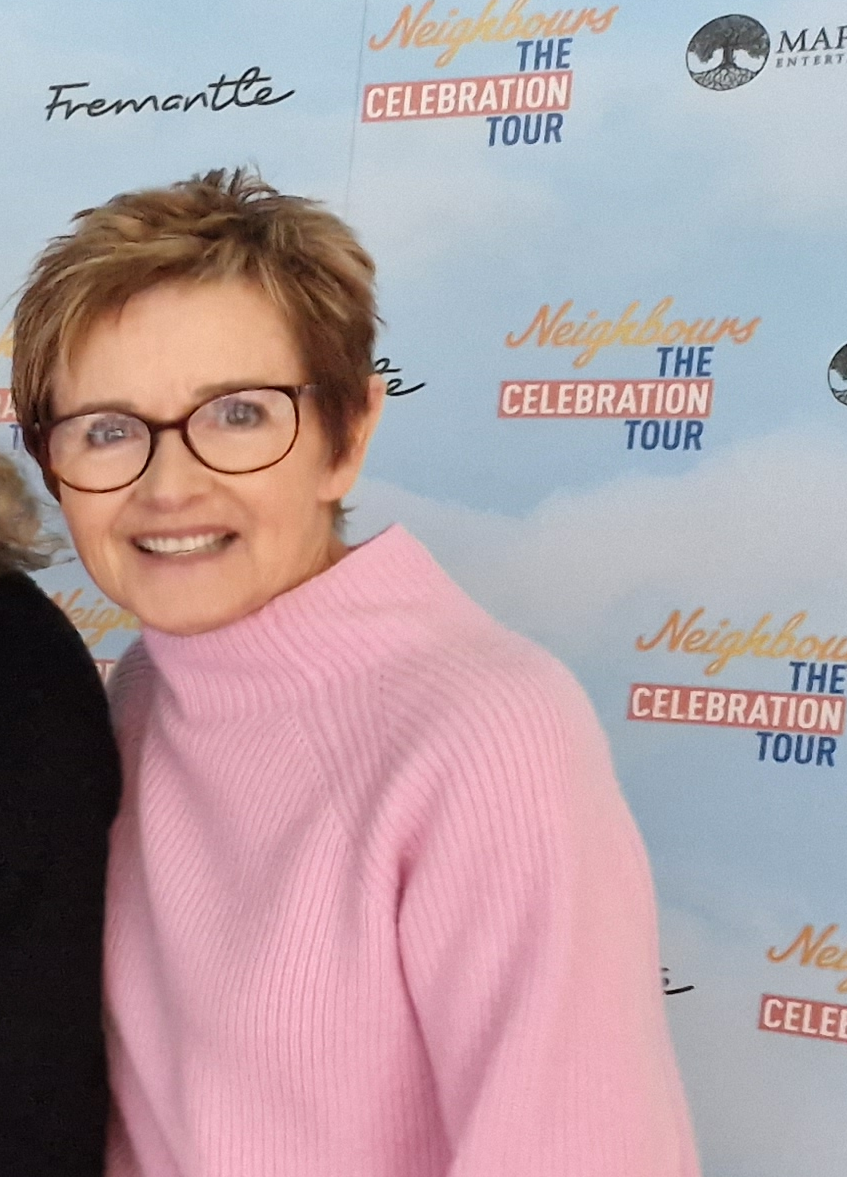
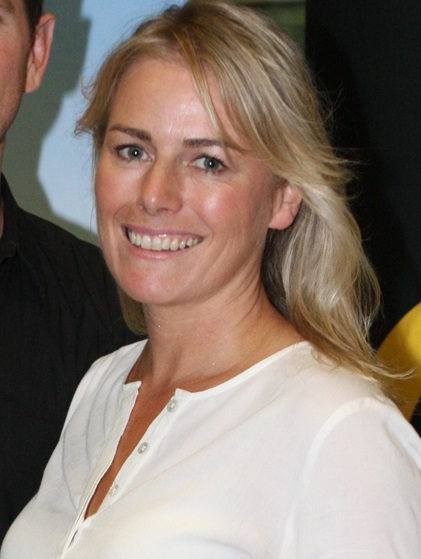
Actress Jackie Woodburne (left) thought the episode would be a conversation starter, while director Kate Kendall (right) was honoured by the opportunity to direct an episode focusing on the show's women.

On 28 February 2019, it was confirmed that Neighbours would be airing a special all-female episode to celebrate International Women's Day. The episode features an all-female cast, and was both written, directed, edited, and produced by women, which is a first for the serial. Actress Sharon Johal also pointed out that the episode "hasn't been done before on Australian television". The show's executive producer Jason Herbison told his fellow producers in 2018 that he had wanted to do something centring around International Women's Day for a long time. Laura Brodnik of Mamamia noted that the episode would not exist without the death of Sonya Rebecchi (Morey), which aired three days prior. "Episode 8055" centres on Piper Willis (Hazel) and her mother Terese Willis (Elmaloglou) bringing the women from Ramsay Street together to help complete the initiatives planned by Sonya for International Women's Day, which includes packing donations for the local women's shelter, while celebrating and supporting women. Everyone also takes the time to remember Sonya and her impact on them and the local community.

Director Kate Kendall said the scenes are about "celebrating" Sonya and looking after her "legacy" as well as one another. She found the episode "really fun to do", but there was a feeling of sadness because one of the show's favourite characters had died, so people were "thinking about things rather than chanting about things." Kendall felt honoured to be given the opportunity to direct an episode focusing on the show's women. She thought that if an episode focusing on International Woman's Day and featuring an all-female cast had been directed by a man, there might have been a power shift or imbalance. During the read-through, Kendall presented each actor with a postcard that had an adjective describing their character on it. In the episode, Piper interviews every woman of Ramsay Street, asking them about their female heroes, which leads to a "rare format change" in which the characters are seen talking to the camera one-on-one. This shifts the focus to putting the video footage together to honour Sonya. Kendall explained "I think what's nice about it, is so often the show is so pacey and so plot driven we rarely get to see people pause and just quietly reflect on things that don't advance or inform the plot." She also said that the scenes help give insight into the characters and she believed it would "enrich" them.

Actress Jackie Woodburne told Seanna Cronin of The Courier-Mail that the cast and crew knew they were creating "something a bit special". Woodburne was pleased to be able to explore the topics raised by International Women's Day in the episode, which she thought would be "a conversation starter." She stated "I think it's terrific and it [International Women's Day] has very much a global drive but I think when we see that reflected in a small neighbourhood it reminds people that we've still got a long way to go." Producer Sara Richardson also thought the episode was "a step in the right direction at a local level" to increase female screen representation. Johal told reporters from The Advertiser that she had a lot of fun filming the episode, saying "Seeing things from a woman's perspective, through a woman's gaze or lens, is a different way of telling a story." Bonnie Anderson also enjoyed making the episode, as her character's scenes show how important it is for women to support other women.

Episode 8055 also sees Susan Kennedy (Woodburne) expressing her worries about Finn Kelly (Mills), who has finally woken up from a coma, while Elly Conway's (Anasta) fiancé Mark Brennan (McGregor) calls off their wedding and she seeks comfort from his sister Chloe Brennan (Pengilly). Anasta loved that viewers got to see the special bond between Elly and Chloe, which had been built up over time, come to a head. The pair share a kiss at the end of the episode, which leads to them having sex. Pengilly explained that even though her character has wanted something to happen with Elly, she is still shocked by the development, but she is "happy, excited and ready to go for it." The scenes lead to a big storyline for Chloe, Elly and Mark in the weeks that follow, as the wedding goes ahead and Elly eventually tells Mark the truth about her night with Chloe.

== Reception ==
Episode 8055 was watched by 110,000 viewers in Australia, which was a small decrease from the previous days episode; however, it still made the top 20 programmes shown on free-to-air multi-channels that day. British soap opera Emmerdale also aired an all-female episode on the same day, which was criticised by a minority of viewers and journalist Piers Morgan "for being exclusionary and patronising." Chloe Timms of Digital Spy defended both episodes. She started by pointing out that special episodes are not new to the genre, using Episode 8052 (Sonya's death) as an example, and said that these episodes are "a treat for viewers" and add excitement and "freshness" into a show that airs all year round. Timms explained that the episodes allowed viewers the opportunity to see female friendships and relationships, as well as characters who do not usually share scenes coming together. She also wrote "We're used to seeing female characters involved in the traditional soapy conflict of love triangles or catfights, tearing each other down. So it'll be a welcome change from the norm to see women coming to the fore in Emmerdale and Neighbours in positive stories that are independent from male characters." Timms added the episodes also highlight the female crew members off-screen, and both soaps had shown off their behind-the-scenes talent in recent times.

A writer for TV Week stated that in the wake of the MeToo movement, women were beginning to share their stories in support of one another and "this special episode is no different" as the characters celebrate Sonya and each other. The writer added "It is an important reminder to viewers of the role women make in each community and why it is worthy of celebrating." Laura Brodnik of Mamamia said the episode starring women and being written and directed by women was "a rarity in the Australian television industry." She also called it a "pivotal TV moment". A review published in the Nambour Weekly branded Episode 8055 "special". Gia Moylan of Hit Network commented that Neighbours was "breaking more TV ground" with the episode, and she used it as an example of how the show had become "quite progressive" in recent years. Bridget McManus from The Sydney Morning Herald cited the episode while speaking about how Neighbours "has better reflected our diversity", while the Herald Sun's Colin Vickery said it contributed to Neighbours becoming "the most 'woke' Aussie drama on commercial television." In 2020, Jackie Epstein from the same newspaper named the episode as one of the serial's 35 most memorable moments.
