= The Imposter (miniseries) =

- Genre: Drama
- Created by: Jason Herbison
- Directed by: Kate Kendall
- Starring: Jackie Woodburne; Kym Marsh; Don Hany; Jane Harber; Dannii Minogue
- Country of origin: Australia
- Original language: English

Production
- Executive producer: Jason Herbison
- Producer: Andrew Thompson
- Production company: Fremantle Australia

Original release
- Network: 5
- Release: 15 December 2025
- Network: Network 10
- Release: 21 December 2025

The Imposter is an Australian-British co-commissioned drama series for 5 and Network 10. The series was created and executively produced by Jason Herbison. The series focuses on matriarch Helen, played by Jackie Woodburne, who refuses to sell her seaside hotel amid pressure from her three children. When the daughter she gave up for adoption appears, a mystery surrounds Helen's secret. In the United Kingdom, The Imposter aired on 15 December 2025 on 5. In Australia, The Imposter aired on 21 December 2025 on Network 10.

== Plot ==
Helen refuses to sell the family property a seaside motel as pressure from her family and someone claiming to be her daughter shows up the hotel hiding its secrets from years prior will see everyone pushed to their limits.

== Cast ==
- Jackie Woodburne as Helen O'Riley
- Kym Marsh as Amanda
- Dannii Minogue as Amanda Metcalfe
- Don Hany as Simon O'Riley
- Jackson Gallagher as Ian O'Riley
- Jane Harber as Kate Templeton
- Charlie Clausen as Todd Templeton
- Chi Nguyen as Courtney
- Kabir Singh as Lee
- Adeline Williams as Corrine
- Olivia Deeble as Eden

== Production ==
On 21 July 2025, the series was announced as an Australian-British co-commission with British actor Kym Marsh and Neighbours actor Jackie Woodburne announced as the series leads. Filming for the series will take place in Victoria with active pre-production occurring in the former Neighbours studios at Nunawading.

The Imposter was created and executively produced by former Neighbours producer Jason Herbison, who also created the co-commissions Riptide and Heat. Kate Kendall will direct the series, with Andrew Thompson producing.

On 30 July, it was announced that Dannii Minogue had joined the cast, in her first major television role since Home and Away. A further announcement on 28 August 2025 confirmed that Jane Harber, Charlie Clausen, Chi Nguyen, Kabir Singh and Adeline Williams had joined the cast.

The Imposter was produced by Fremantle Australia and aired on Network 10 and 5.

== Reception ==
Viewers of the show were taken aback by the wig that was worn by the character of Helen, with most viewers having a negative reaction to it, some taking to social media to call the wig "atrocious" and "difficult to ignore".
