= Yasbincek =

Yasbincek is a surname. Notable people with the surname include:

- Asher Yasbincek, Australian actress
- Morgan Yasbincek, Australian poet, novelist and academic
