= Riptide (2022 TV series) =

- Genre: Psychological thriller
- Created by: Jason Herbison
- Written by: Jason Herbison; Margaret Wilson; Anthony Ellis
- Directed by: Scott Major
- Starring: Jo Joyner; Peter O'Brien; Ciarán Griffiths; David Berry; Ben Turland; Asher Yasbincek
- Composers: Cornel Wilczek; Pascal Babare; Thomas Rouch
- Country of origin: Australia
- Original language: English
- No. of seasons: 1
- No. of episodes: 4

Production
- Executive producer: Jason Herbison
- Producer: Natalie Mandel
- Production location: Melbourne
- Cinematography: Craig Barden
- Editor: Kylie Robertson
- Running time: 60 minutes
- Production company: Fremantle Australia

Original release
- Network: Channel 5 (UK); Network 10 (Australia)
- Release: 27 December – 30 December 2022

Riptide is a 2022 British-Australian psychological thriller television series created by Jason Herbison anddirected by Scott Major. It was broadcast over four consecutive days from 27 December 2022 on Channel 5 in the UK and aired from 28 June 2023 on Network 10 in Australia. The plot focuses on Alison Weston, whose husband Sean mysteriously disappears while surfing. Riptide stars Jo Joyner, Peter O'Brien, Ciarán Griffiths, David Berry, Ben Turland, and Asher Yasbincek. It was filmed in locations across the state of Victoria, including Melbourne and the Network 10 studios in Nunawading in August 2022.

== Plot ==
Alison has just married Australian Sean Weston. Both of their children struggle with the new family situation, and Alison's former husband wants her back. When Sean disappears during a morning surf, it is not clear if he got caught up in a rip tide or if there is more to his disappearance.

== Cast ==
- Jo Joyner as Alison Weston
- Peter O'Brien as Sean Weston
- Ciarán Griffiths as Michael Lane
- David Berry as Dan Burrell/Simon Cameron
- Ben Turland as Ethan Weston
- Asher Yasbincek as Hannah Lane
- Ally Fowler as Rachel Weston
- Yazeed Daher as Logan Williams
- Sonya Suares as Sergeant Bhomik
- Pia Miranda as Jenny Clarke
- Benjamin Samaddar as Jesse Patel
- Max Brown as Finn Baker
- Patrick Harvey as Andrew White
- Patrick Williams as Philip Eldersly
- Emma Choy as Naomi Burrell
- Toby Lang as Constable Lang
- Ashley Stocco as Detective Abela
- Adam McConvell as Detective Da Silva
- Judy Beaumont as Sara Wiseman
- Hannah Ogawa as Melody Ling
- Scott Major as Daniel Burrell

== Production ==
The series was commissioned following the success of Lie With Me (2021). It is one of two drama commissions for Channel 5 made by Fremantle Australia in partnership with Australia's Network Ten. Riptide was created by Jason Herbison, who is also producing the series alongside Natalie Mandel. Herbison commented: "I'm thrilled to continue the partnership with Channel 5 and 10 and to bring Riptide to life. It's the best of British meeting the best of Australian casts and crews – and I can't wait for the audience to see what we have in store." The scripts have been by written by Herbison, Margaret Wilson, and Anthony Ellis.

The cast were revealed on 14 July 2022. British actress Jo Joyner plays Alison Weston. She described Alison as "a warm and layered character whose world is turned upside down, just when it seemed like her life was finally coming together." Peter O'Brien is Sean Weston, Alison's Australian husband. Ciarán Griffiths plays Alison's former husband Michael Lane, and David Berry is the Weston's neighbour Dan Burrell. Ben Turland and Asher Yasbincek play Alison and Sean's children Ethan and Hannah respectively. Other cast members include Ally Fowler as Sean's former wife Rachel Weston, Pia Miranda as Jenny Clarke, Yazeed Daher as Hannah's friend Logan Williams, Benjamin Samaddar as Jesse Patel, and Sonya Suares as Sergeant Bhomik. Additional cast include Max Brown as Finn Baker, Patrick Harvey as Andrew White, Patrick Williams as Philip Eldersly, Emma Choy as Naomi Burrell, Toby Lang as Constable Lang, Ashley Stocco as Detective Abela, Adam McConvell as Detective Da Silva, Judy Beaumont as Sara, and Hannah Ogawa as Melody Ling.

Riptide was directed by Scott Major. Production on the four-part series began in early August 2022, and concluded on 22 August. It was filmed on-location across Victoria, including Melbourne, Mount Eliza, and the Dandenong Ranges. Some scenes were filmed at the Network 10 studios in Nunawading, previously used by the Australian soap opera Neighbours. The series received funding from VicScreen.

A promotional trailer for the show was released in November 2022. Riptide was broadcast across four consecutive nights from 27 December 2022 in the UK. It aired from 28 June 2023 on Network 10 in Australia.

== Episodes ==
No.	Title	Directed by	Written by	Original release date	UK viewers (millions)
1	"Episode 1"	Scott Major	Jason Herbison	27 December 2022	N/A
2	"Episode 2"	Scott Major	Margaret Wilson	28 December 2022	N/A
3	"Episode 3"	Scott Major	Anthony Ellis	29 December 2022	N/A
4	"Episode 4"	Scott Major	Jason Herbison	30 December 2022	N/A

== Reception ==
Ahead of the first episode being broadcast, Morgan Cormack of the Radio Times said the series had caught their attention and thought it "looks positively ominous" from the teaser trailer. In her review of the series, Cormack's colleague Jane Rackham called it "intriguing" and stated: "Initially it has all the hallmarks of an upmarket version of Neighbours... until Sean disappears while out for his daily surf. The briefly glimpsed flashbacks suggest it maybe wasn't an accident."

Emily Watkins of the i gave Riptide three out of five stars. In her mixed review, Watkins wrote "Certainly, there was no shortage of narrative meat to sink your teeth into. While Riptide sometimes seemed to have bitten off more than it could chew – at Sean's funeral, for instance, where all those antagonists collided – its well-paced writing and confident performances meant that any instances of overreaching were short-lived and easily forgiven." Watkins thought the characters were mostly unlikeable, but praised O'Brien and Joyner's performances for giving the series "much needed depth." She added that "the first episode of Riptide promised a lot. Let's hope the next three episodes can deliver."

In a negative review, James Jackson from The Times gave the show two out of five stars and said "Jo Joyner does furrowed brow to perfection but this down under drama of sun, surf and suspense is no eye-catcher." Jackson also likened the show to "a dark Neighbours special, and not in a particularly fun way."
