= Anthony Ellis =

Anthony Ellis may refer to:

- Anthony Ellys (1690–1761), English bishop of St David's
- Anthony Ellis (writer), Welsh-Australian writer and television executive
- Antony Ellis, English-American writer of radio and television programs
- Tony Ellis (born 1964), English footballer
