= Episode 7202 (Neighbours) =

- Neighbours episode
- Episode no.: Episode 7202
- Directed by: Declan Eames
- Written by: Jason Herbison
- Original air date: 1 September 2015

Episode chronology
← Previous; Episode 7201	Next → Episode 7203

"Episode 7202" is the 7202nd episode of the Australian soap opera Neighbours. It premiered on Eleven on 1 September 2015. The episode was written by series producer Jason Herbison and directed by Declan Eames. It is Neighbours' first three-hander in its thirty-year history. Typically episodes of the show feature the ensemble cast and multiple on-going storylines. Episode 7202 focuses on the conclusion to a long-running love triangle between Lauren Turner (Kate Kendall), Brad Willis (Kip Gamblin) and Terese Willis (Rebekah Elmaloglou). Herbison hoped the episode would be memorable for viewers, while Gamblin was grateful that he, Elmaloglou and Kendall were trusted enough with it.

Kendall thought the love-triangle was the perfect storyline to use the three-hander style and Elmaloglou said the consequences would be felt for a long time within the show. The episode was filmed in early June 2015. It is set in just two of the six houses on Ramsay Street. The actors described the filming schedule as "pretty busy" and a "collaborative effort". The episode was preceded by an online bonus scene titled "Before Dawn". Episode 7202 received a positive reception from television critics, with one calling it "an ambitious move" and another dubbing it a "landmark episode" for the show. For his work on the episode, Herbison earned an AWGIE Award for Best Script for a Television Serial.

== Plot ==
After spending the night together, Lauren Turner (Kate Kendall) and Brad Willis (Kip Gamblin) discuss how things have changed between them. At Number 22, Terese Willis (Rebekah Elmaloglou) wakes up on the sofa alone and stares at an empty wine glass. Lauren asks Brad what he and Terese argued about and he tells her that Terese has not been attending her AA meetings. Lauren then tells him that their night together does not have to go any further, but they agree to tell Terese, even though it could spell the end of the Willis's marriage. As he returns home, Brad finds Terese pouring a bottle of wine down the sink. She admits that she has a drinking problem and is willing to change. Terese then visits Lauren to ask for phone numbers of counsellors. Lauren calls Brad to tell him they can not reveal their affair to Terese. However, Terese receives an email containing aerial photos of the neighbourhood and she sees a picture of Brad and Lauren kissing. Realising that her husband has begun an affair, a devastated Terese returns to Number 32.

Terese baits Lauren with questions about Brad until Lauren realises that Terese knows. Brad sees the email and returns to Lauren's home where Terese throws a jam jar at him. In the garden, Terese forces Lauren to admit that she has had feelings for Brad since they were reunited two years ago. Terese believes the affair has been going on for a while, and tries to find proof on Lauren's phone. She pushes Lauren into the swimming pool during the struggle. Brad goes after Terese and tries to explain that he and Lauren were going to tell her. Brad begs Terese to keep her appointment with the councillor, while she tells him to leave. Brad goes back to Lauren and asks if she meant what she said about having feelings for him for all that time. She says yes and gives him an ultimatum – try to work out a relationship with her or save his marriage to Terese. After leaving a sketch of Brad that Lauren drew on the lawn of Number 32, Terese calls her son and asks him to bring everyone home.

== Production ==
=== Conception and development ===
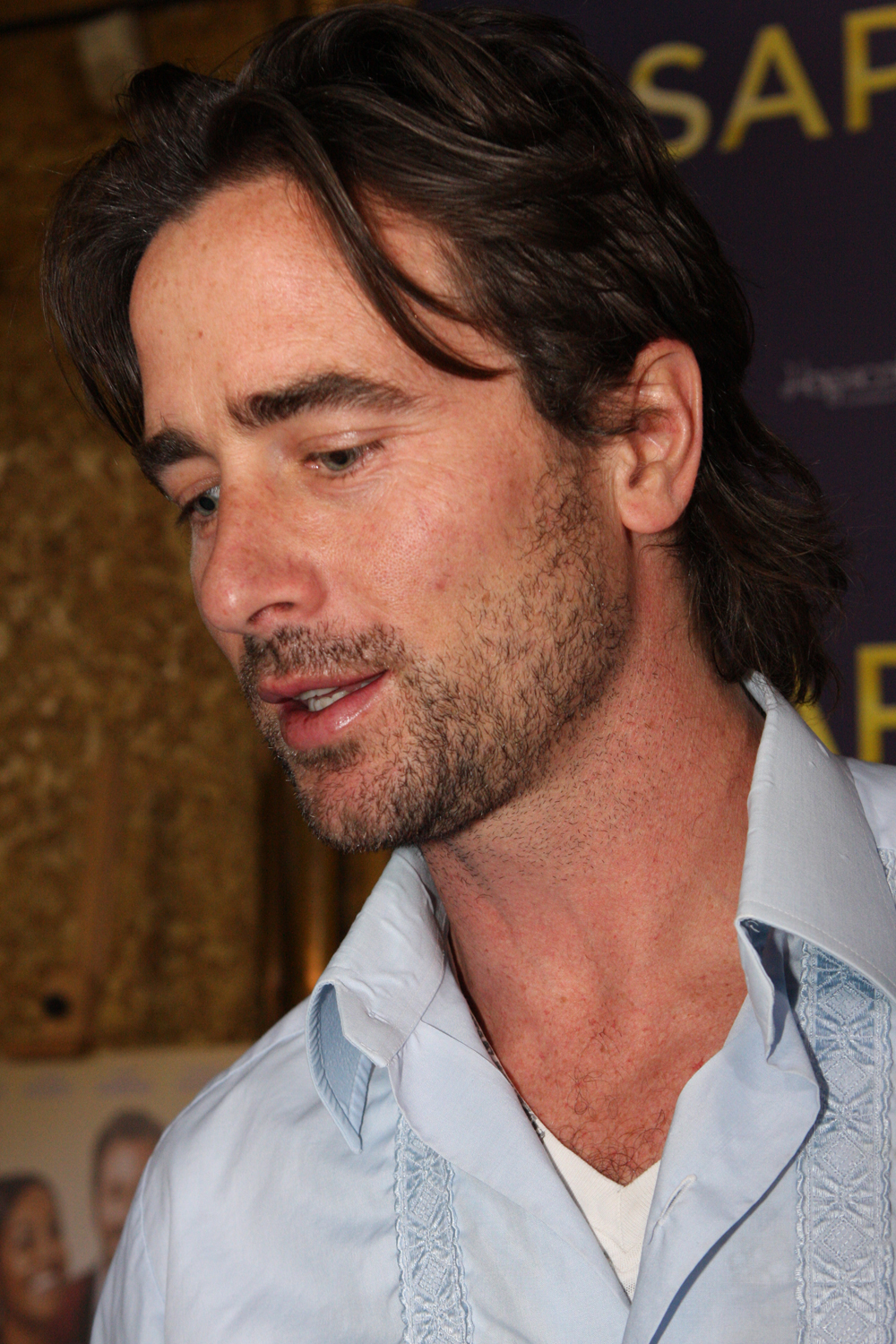
Kip Gamblin was grateful for the chance to be a part of the show's first three-hander.

On 18 August 2015, David Knox of TV Tonight reported that Neighbours would be airing their first three-hander – an episode that features just three characters – on 1 September. The show's episodes usually feature an ensemble cast with multiple on-going storylines. Knox observed that it is uncommon for an Australian drama to focus on so few actors. Episode 7202 centres on the conclusion to a love-triangle storyline that had been running since 2013, with Brad Willis finally choosing Lauren Turner over his wife Terese. The episode is set in just two houses on opposite sides of Ramsay Street, and the scenes deal with three of the five stages of grief: denial, anger and bargaining.

The show's series producer Jason Herbison wrote the episode, and he hoped that it would be memorable for viewers in the future. He admitted to being worried about how the actors would react to the script, explaining "I was a bit nervous when I broke the news of the episode to Kate, Kip and Rebekah. Filming an entire episode with no other cast is a big call in fast-moving serial television. However, all three embraced the challenge and delivered some of their best performances ever."

Gamblin was grateful to the producers for trusting that he, Elmaloglou and Kendall could carry such an important episode. He told Sarah Ellis from Inside Soap "Usually we get three or four scenes, so to have a whole episode to ourselves was good – even though there were a lot of lines to learn!" Kendall expressed her amazement that a three-hander had not been done before, but believed the love triangle was the perfect storyline to use the style. She felt excited about the script when she received it and branded the plot "really interesting". Kendall told Carena Crawford of All About Soap that it was a challenge to find the much needed depth and subtlety for the scenes. Episode 7202 was preceded by an online bonus scene called "Before Dawn", which featured Brad and Lauren discussing their feelings for each other after they had sex.

Gamblin admitted that he was not surprised to learn Brad and Lauren would finally give into their feelings for one another. He believed many fans of the show had wanted Brad and Lauren to get together from the moment the Turner and Willis families arrived in 2013. Ellis observed that it was "inevitable" that they would reunite at some point. Brad and Terese's marriage was tested multiple times, but things came to a head when Terese's alcoholism and Brad's lack of sensitivity to her feelings began affecting their children. After Brad and Lauren's one-night stand, Gamblin said Brad felt guilty, but he also wanted to be honest and tell Terese to "minimise the damage". Elmaloglou thought the consequences of the episode would be felt for a long time afterwards, and that some "interesting dynamics" would also develop between the families.

=== Filming ===
The episode was filmed in early June 2015. Gamblin described the filming schedule as "pretty busy", while Elmaloglou called it "a real collaborative effort". For the scene in which Terese throws a jam jar at Brad, Elmaloglou was told to aim for Gamblin's head and he would get out of the way. Gamblin said that if he had failed to duck in time, she would have hit him across the face. The actors had two chances to get the take right as there were only two jam jars available for the scene. Kendall told an Inside Soap columnist that the stunt where Terese pushes Lauren in the pool could only be shot once, as it would take too long to dry out their hair and clothes. She explained "so we knew what the money shot was, and worked everything else up towards that." Kendall and Elmaloglou were unable to hear Eames call out "cut", so they continued "really going at it" resulting in the final take.

== Reception ==
Episode 7202 was watched by 222,000 Australian viewers upon its first airing, making Neighbours the tenth highest rated show on digital multi-channels that night. This was an increase of 25,000 viewers from the previous nights episode. Upon its broadcast in the UK on 15 September, the episode was seen by 764,000 viewers at 1.45pm and 597,000 at 5.30pm, an increase on the previous days episode.

Herbison received the Best Script for a Television Serial accolade at the 2016 AWGIE Awards. Television critic Melinda Houston of The Sydney Morning Herald praised the episode, saying "it's an ambitious move for both the writer and actors – and it really works." She gave it three and a half stars out of five. A reporter for the same publication branded the episode "special" and observed that "both the script and the performers are tested when the whole half-hour is given over to one storyline and three players". They singled out Kendall's performance as being particularity good, saying she "delivers scenes that transcend the genre." Anna Brain of the Herald Sun called the episode "a Neighbours special event, as the entire episode stars only three cast faves." She said it was "drama central" as Brad, Lauren and Terese "hash it out, without any meddling neighbours to chime in."

Knox (TV Tonight) noted that the actors' "commitment together with the unique approach is what separates this from other episodes. Fans will doubtless look back on this as one of the more memorable stories." Katie Baillie of Metro branded the episode "dark and tense". Michael Cregan of Inside Soap included the episode in his "5 top soap moments" feature when it aired in the UK. Carena Crawford of All About Soap dubbed it a "landmark episode", while a Soap World reporter named it "Best Special Episode" during their feature on the highs and lows of soap operas in 2015. The reporter wrote that the "tense and gripping scenes" kept viewers watching.
