= Lie with Me (2021 TV series) =

Australian television drama series

- Promotional poster
- Genre: Drama
- Created by: Jason Herbison
- Written by: Anthony Ellis; Margaret Wilson; Jason Herbison
- Directed by: Scott Major
- Starring: Brett Tucker; Charlie Brooks; Phoebe Roberts
- Composers: Pascal Babare; Thomas Rouch; Cornel Wilczek
- Country of origin: Australia
- Original language: English
- No. of seasons: 1
- No. of episodes: 4

Production
- Executive producers: Jason Herbison; Chris Oliver-Taylor; Jo Porter
- Producers: Natalie Mandel; Brett Popplewell
- Running time: 60 minutes
- Production company: Fremantle Australia

Original release
- Network: Network 10 (Australia); Channel 5 (UK)
- Release: 12 July – 15 July 2021

Lie With Me is an Australian television drama series that premiered on Channel 5 on 12 July 2021 and on Network 10 on 3 November 2021.

== Synopsis ==
A couple moves to Australia after an affair, and encounters a nanny who brings more trouble into their lives.

== Cast ==
- Charlie Brooks as Anna Fallmont
- Brett Tucker as Jake Fallmont
- Phoebe Roberts as Becky Hart
- Caroline Gillmer as Cynthia Fallmont
- Alba Nicholls as Grace Fallmont
- Hunter Hurley and Ned Kennelly as Oliver Fallmont
- Alfie Gledhill as Liam Henderson
- Isabella Giovinazzo as Caroline Wilder
- Nadine Garner as Detective Taormina
- Frank Magree as Officer Page
- Stephen Lopez as Detective Garrison
- Neil Melville as Ray Tucker
- John Marc Desengano as Pavan
- Bert La Bonté as Phil
- Irene Chen as Dr Katherine Lee
- Renai Caruso as Jo Murray

== Production ==
The four part series is filmed in Melbourne with funding assistance from Film Victoria.

== Episodes ==
No.	Title	Directed by	Written by	Original release date	UK viewers (millions)
1	"Episode One"	Scott Major	Anthony Ellis	12 July 2021	3.67
2	"Episode Two"	Scott Major	Margaret Wilson	13 July 2021	3.41
3	"Episode Three"	Scott Major	Jason Herbison	14 July 2021	3.60
4	"Episode Four"	Scott Major	Jason Herbison	15 July 2021	3.55

== Reception ==
In 2022, Jason Herbison, Margaret Wilson and Anthony Ellis received an AWGIE Award nomination for Best Script for Television – Limited Series at the 55th ceremony.
