= Episode 8498 (Neighbours) =

- Neighbours episode
- Episode no.: Season 35; Episode 8498
- Directed by: Scott Major
- Written by: Jason Herbison
- Original air date: 19 November 2020
- Running time: 22 minutes

Guest appearances
- Lachlan Millar as Richie Amblin; Dhruv Malge as Jay Rebecchi; Ellmir Asipi as Ollie Sudekis

Episode chronology
← Previous; Episode 8497	Next → Episode 8499

Episode 8498 of the Australian soap opera Neighbours was broadcast on 10 Peach on 19 November 2020. The episode was written by the serial's executive producer Jason Herbison and directed by Scott Major. It features an all male cast in celebration of International Men's Day. The plot initially focuses on the younger male characters being excited to start their Schoolies trip, until Hendrix Greyson (Ben Turland) learns about an app that is being used by the boys to rank their female classmates. Meanwhile, Hendix's father Pierce Greyson (Don Hany) heads to the campsite after learning Hendrix took his car, accompanied by some unlikely passengers. He is followed by Shane Rebecchi (Nicholas Coghlan), whose anger at Pierce's affair with his wife leads to a confrontation and fight between the two.

The episode was conceived after the success of the International Women's Day episode that featured an all female cast. Herbison wanted to create an episode that explored social issues relevant to men, including mental health, same-sex parenting, relationships, and men supporting each other. Herbison explained that the show already had a few storylines involving the male characters in progress, so it was natural to have them converge. He also thought it was a good opportunity to tell parallel storylines with the younger and older generations. The episode features every male member of the cast, and actor Alan Fletcher said each of the characters "epitomises an element of maleness". Episode 8498 was originally scheduled to be filmed at a house in the Dandenong Ranges, but due to the COVID-19 pandemic, the shoot was relocated to the show's studio backlot. For his work on the episode, Herbison received a nomination for Best Script for a Television Serial at the AWGIE Awards.

== Plot ==
Students Hendrix Greyson (Ben Turland), Jay Rebecchi (Dhruv Malge), Richie Amblin (Lachlan Millar) and Ollie Sudekis (Ellmir Asipi) arrive at their campsite for Schoolies. Ollie receives alerts from a phone app and makes a reference to rankings. Jay then reveals that he took some wine from the Kennedys' house. Back on Ramsay Street, Hendrix's father Pierce Greyson (Don Hany) visits Aaron Brennan (Matt Wilson) and David Tanaka (Takaya Honda) to ask after his estranged wife, Chloe Brennan (April Rose Pengilly). Paul Robinson (Stefan Dennis) arrives to tell Pierce that Hendrix has taken his car. At Number 30, Shane Rebecchi (Nicholas Coghlan) contemplates taking some pills until he hears his brother Toadfish Rebecchi (Ryan Moloney) and Karl Kennedy (Alan Fletcher) talking. Pierce comes over to let Shane know that he is going to the campsite to check on their sons. Paul questions Aaron and David about their potential surrogate arrangement with Nicolette Stone (Charlotte Chimes). Pierce asks to borrow Aaron's car, and David suggests he and Aaron come too, while Paul invites himself along. Toadie calls Jay and hears Ollie tipping over the drinks table, so he, Karl and Shane decide to go to the campsite. Hendrix gets hold of Ollie's phone and discovers an app called The Ladder, which is being used to rank their female classmates. Hendrix notices Richie has rated his girlfriend Mackenzie Hargreaves (Georgie Stone), and Richie explains that he did it to stop the gossip about them not having sex because she is transgender. Hendrix calls Ollie disgusting for making several disrespectful jokes about girls.

In the cars, Paul continues to question Aaron and David about their surrogacy plan, while Shane begins speeding. In the car park, Pierce calls out Shane's erratic driving and they argue about Pierce's affair with Shane's wife, Dipi Rebecchi (Sharon Johal). Shane pushes Pierce and they fight. Karl notices a small bag of pills fall out of Shane's pocket. Aaron and David leave to attend to the boys. Shane admits that he was tempted to take the pills, as Dipi has not spoken to him yet. Karl advises him to fix how he sees himself, before he fixes his marriage. Meanwhile, Pierce wonders how he can repair his marriage, but Paul points out that it is over and advises Pierce to set himself and Chloe free. Karl tells Toadie that Shane needs ongoing support for his addiction. Aaron and David inform the group that the boys are a mess and Schoolies is cancelled. Pierce says that they are going to have to tell Susan Kennedy (Jackie Woodburne), the school principal, about The Ladder, while Hendrix says the girls need to know too. Richie asks if they can keep it between themselves, but Hendrix replies that they are going to tell them everything.

== Production ==
The episode was conceived after the success of the soap's 8055th episode, which marked International Women's Day in 2019 and featured an all female cast. Executive producer Jason Herbison wanted to write an episode that focused on the show's male characters and explored social issues relevant to them. Herbison told Amy Hadley of TV Week that International Men's Day is about celebrating positive male role models and raising awareness of the issues that men face. He said the episode would deal with several social issues such as mental health, toxic masculinity, same-sex parenting, relationships and men supporting each other. Herbison stated: "Two major storylines come to a head and ultimately we see our male characters supporting each other as they navigate some major challenges in their lives."

Herbison felt that as the show already had a few storylines involving the male characters in progress, it was "natural" to have them converge in the episode. He also felt that they had a good opportunity to tell "parallel stories" with the younger and older generations. He thought that with the subject matter some of the scenes would be "confronting" for viewers, but there would be some "uplifting moments too." Herbison ultimately wanted the episode to be "thought-provoking", but not hard to watch, adding "The truth is that society puts pressure on us according to our gender, which results in certain behaviours." Actor Alan Fletcher, who plays Karl Kennedy, told Inside Soap's Sarah Ellis that after the episode for International Women's Day the year before, it was good that they got to do the men's one too and that he had "great fun" being involved in the episode, despite only featuring in a few scenes. He explained that each of the characters featured in the episode "epitomises an element of maleness" and shows both the good and bad sides of being a man.

Episode 8498 featured every male member of the soap's then-current cast. It was directed by former cast member Scott Major. It was originally scheduled to be filmed at a holiday house in the Dandenong Ranges, but due to the COVID-19 pandemic and subsequent restrictions in the country, the shoot was relocated to the show's studio backlot in Forest Hill. Herbison said he was proud of the cast and crew for coming together to complete the episode amid "challenging circumstances", and he praised Major for his "incredible job directing." Fletcher also chose to participate in Movember through his character and grew a moustache to raise awareness. However, because of the filming and broadcast schedule for the episode, he had to grow the moustache in August.

One of the major storylines that comes to a head in the episode is the "simmering tension" between Pierce Greyson (Don Hany) and Shane Rebecchi (Nicholas Coghlan), following Pierce's affair with Shane's wife, Dipi (Sharon Johal). Shane is finally able to unleash his anger about the affair and he follows Pierce to the campsite, where he confronts his rival and they physically fight. Coghlan said his character feels betrayed by Pierce, and that "his frustration at the situation boils over, and Shane really goes to town on Pierce." Coghlan explained that Shane has been left in limbo, as he does not know what his wife is thinking. The actor pointed out that during the episode, Shane expresses that the lack of communication from Dipi has thrown him and he has been contemplating taking drugs again – something that pushed Dipi to have an affair in the first place. The confrontation with Shane also forces Pierce to realise that his own marriage to Chloe Brennan (April Rose Pengilly) is over.

== Reception ==
Herbison received a nomination for Best Script for a Television Serial at the 2021 AWGIE Awards for the episode. Simon Timblick of What's on TV branded the episode "special", and the episode was labelled as "Must-see" by Sarah Waterfall in the print magazine. A writer for TV Soap said the episode allowed Neighbours to "showcase the talents of their cast". While Digital Spy's Joe Anderton quipped "it will hopefully stop people going, 'If there's an International Women's Day, why isn't there an International Men's Day?'"

The Metro's Katie Baillie commented that "Hendrix (Benny Turland) and Richie (Lachlan Miller) can't handle Schoolies and both go off the rails". The fight between Shane and Pierce attracted the attentions of critics, with one from the South Wales Echo observing that Shane and Pierce had "an explosive confrontation". While the TV Soap writer noted that "all hopes of civility are lost as weeks of tension boil over, leading Shane and Pierce to lash out with their fists". Johnathon Hughes from the Radio Times joked "If you've been patiently waiting for the two men in Dipi's life to come to blows, don't miss this week's episodes." Hughes also wrote that Shane resorts to confronting Pierce "the old-fashioned way – with fisticuffs."
