= Episode 8052 (Neighbours) =

- Neighbours episode
- Episode no.: Episode 8052
- Directed by: Kate Kendall
- Written by: Jason Herbison
- Original air date: 5 March 2019

Guest appearance
- Morgan Baker as Callum Rebecchi

Episode chronology
← Previous; Episode 8051	Next → Episode 8053

"Episode 8052" of the Australian soap opera Neighbours premiered on 10 Peach in Australia and Channel 5 in the United Kingdom on 5 March 2019. The episode was written by series producer Jason Herbison and directed by Kate Kendall. It features the death of series regular Sonya Rebecchi (Eve Morey) from ovarian cancer. She and her husband Toadfish Rebecchi (Ryan Moloney) take a road trip to the beach to spend the day with their children. It is mostly a two-hander between Morey and Moloney, a format which allows the focus to be on Sonya's final storyline.

The episode was conceived after Morey was informed in March 2018 that her contract would not be renewed, in an effort to reduce the show's production costs. She asked for her character to be killed off, knowing there was no other plausible reason for Sonya to leave her husband and children. Episode 8052 was filmed over a week in December 2018, after a production delay due to bad weather. Morey returned to film the scenes two weeks after she had wrapped her stint on the show. She said she was "satisfied" with Sonya's final scenes and believed she had done her character justice.

Two promotional trailers featuring scenes from the episode were released in February 2019. Episode 8052 posted a small ratings increase in Australia. It received positive reviews from critics and viewers, who praised Morey and Moloney's performances. Some viewers campaigned on social media for Morey to win a Logie Award. Maddison Hockey of TV Week called the episode "touching and beautiful", while Daniel Kilkelly of Digital Spy found it to be "gut-wrenching, tragic and incredibly difficult to watch".

== Plot ==
Sonya Rebecchi (Eve Morey) and her husband Toadfish "Toadie" Rebecchi (Ryan Moloney) pack their car, as they prepare to join their children at a beach house. As Toadie goes inside to get his son's iPad, Sonya takes a moment to look at all the houses on Ramsay Street. They stop at the Lassiter's complex, where Toadie buys junk food and Sonya teases him about his secret food stashes. As they travel down the freeway, they sing along to some music before Sonya declares she does not want a funeral but a memorial by the lake instead. Toadie tries to assure her that they are getting the best treatment for her ovarian cancer, but Sonya wants to be prepared just in case. Toadie notices Sonya is looking nauseous. She says she is fine, and they joke about his domineering mother. Toadie wants to pull over. Sonya asks him to wait for the next rest area, but she has trouble remembering what it is called. Toadie pulls the car over next to a field and Sonya assures him she is just feeling ill from the chemotherapy and carsickness. While Toadie goes off to urinate, Sonya becomes dizzy and her vision blurs. Toadie later finds Sonya in the field picking wildflowers and they take a moment to admire the view.

As they continue their journey, Toadie becomes concerned that Sonya is talking about a future that she is not part of. She becomes upset as she wonders what happens to people when they die and admits she is scared of not seeing him and the children again. Sonya finally tells Toadie that the chemotherapy has had no effect on the tumour in her brain, and she has days to live. Toadie experiences grief and anger. Sonya asks him to take her to the children. As they reach the beach house, Sonya promises not to give up. After learning their children are at the beach, Sonya becomes desperate to see them and they make their way there. Sonya starts feeling weaker and tells Toadie that he will have to let her go. She makes him promise to lean on his friends and family and take care of the children. She also urges him to find love again when he is ready. She sits and watches the children playing, while Toadie hugs her. As her breathing becomes shallow, Sonya says she knows that heaven exists because it is with Toadie and her family. Sonya falls limp in his arms. He tries to rouse her, but soon realises she has died.

== Production ==
=== Conception ===
In early December 2018, Neighbours announced that "a fan favourite" character would be killed off during 2019. The following month it was confirmed that Sonya Rebecchi, played by Eve Morey, would be diagnosed with stage IV ovarian cancer, which would eventually lead to her death. Morey said that the producers chose to write her character out to reduce the program's production costs. The show's future had been called into question when Network Ten entered voluntary administration in 2017. The producers informed Morey in March 2018, shortly after she returned to work following maternity leave, that her contract would not be renewed. She said, "There's no doubt that it was a hard decision to make, but that's just the way the job goes sometimes. Once I'd let go of my ego a bit, it ended up working out exactly the way it should."

After accepting that her character would be leaving, Morey wanted to know what would happen to Sonya and her husband Toadfish "Toadie" Rebecchi (played by Ryan Moloney), as she was keen "to preserve the integrity of these characters". Morey suggested that Sonya would have to die, as there was no other plausible reason for her to leave Toadie and their children, especially after everything they had been through together. Morey did not want her character to "go off the rails" and suffer an alcohol or drugs relapse again. That might have made her unpopular with viewers, who would not have cared as much about her death. Moloney came up with a final storyline for the character, which saw Sonya struck by a car as she hurried to meet Toadie, who had been given the all-clear after his own battle with cancer.

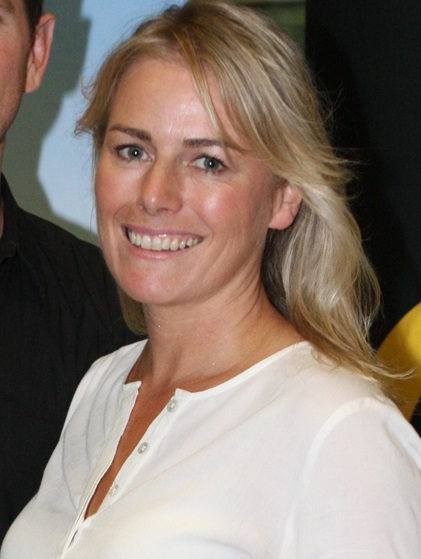
Former Neighbours actress Kate Kendall directed the episode.

Episode 8052 was written by series producer Jason Herbison and directed by former Neighbours actress Kate Kendall. It is mostly a two-hander between Morey and Moloney. David Knox of TV Tonight called it "a rare move", as typical episodes feature the ensemble cast and multiple storylines. Morey was pleased that it was written as a two-hander, so that the focus would only be on Sonya's storyline. She told Katie Baillie of Metro, "Sometimes you can act your little guts off in a scene and then it will cut to the Waterhole—you need light and shade otherwise some of these storylines can be too much, but it was great to know that this final episode was—they weren't going to cut to Sheila doing something."

The plot sees Sonya and Toadie taking a road trip to the beach to join their children, shortly after Sonya learns her condition has deteriorated. Morey explained that Sonya is aware she has not got long to live, so she feels that she needs to "empower" Toadie to carry on without her. During the journey, Sonya's condition deteriorates, and she shares her last wishes with him, as well as questioning whether heaven really exists. Moloney said his character is "completely gutted" when Sonya tells him she is going to die soon. Upon reaching the beach, Sonya decides that the children should not see her and she lays in Toadie's arms, where she realises that being with her family is heaven. Morey added, "She dies content and grateful for the life that she's had, which is pretty ideal. Not a lot of people get that."

=== Filming ===
The episode was filmed at an exterior beach location in December 2018. Moloney described filming the scenes as "horrible and beautiful all at the same time". He explained, "We went away for more than a week to shoot it all. The whole week was just horrible, but at the same time, it was nice that we got the chance to actually be in love for the last storyline." Morey revealed that they were supposed to film the scenes earlier, but bad weather halted production. She returned to film them two weeks after she had wrapped her stint on the show. Morey found that the two-week gap gave her a better perspective on Sonya's final scenes, and allowed her to approach them in a different way. She also said that Kendall helped her and Moloney to "find the light and shade" in the scenes, so the characters are seen laughing and joking, just being together, before Sonya's last moments. Moloney commented that the final shooting day was "stunning", as the sun came out, and it felt "as if it was meant to be". Morey was "satisfied" with Sonya's final scenes and felt she had done her character justice.

== Promotion and broadcast ==
Scenes from the episode were first seen in a promotional trailer for the show released on 22 February 2018. A second trailer, released on 25 February, asked viewers: "If you had one day left, how would you live it?", as scenes from the episode played. As the trailer ends, a voiceover is heard saying "It's time to say goodbye to Sonya". Episode 8052 aired on 5 March 2019 in Australia and the United Kingdom. The cast, crew, and Fremantle Australia personnel held a private screening of the episode at Como Cinemas in South Yarra.

== Reception ==
The original broadcast of Episode 8052 was watched by 126,000 viewers in Australia, which was a small increase from the previous day's episode. In the UK, the episode failed to make the top 15 most watched television shows on Channel 5 for that week, but it was the highest rated episode of Neighbours across PC/laptop, tablet and smartphone users, and sixth overall behind episodes of The Bachelor.

The episode received positive reviews from critics and viewers, many of whom began campaigning on social media for Morey to win the Logie Award for Most Popular Actress. TV Week's Maddison Hockey wrote, "Sonya's sudden illness has been an emotional whirlwind that culminates in a touching and beautiful episode of Neighbours. Tears are guaranteed". Metro's Katie Baillie called Sonya's death "the moment we've all been dreading" calling it "utterly heartbreaking" and "poignant". Laura-Jayne Tyler of Inside Soap wrote Morey and Moloney's performances were "sublime, and deserve to win every award going". Lisa Woolford of The Advertiser dubbed the episode "powerful" and wrote "It's pretty much just Toadie and Sonya for the entire 30 minutes. It's beautifully shot, and beautifully written. But be warned you will need tissues, it's genuinely heartbreaking as the couple try to confront her fate."

Claire Crick of What's on TV also praised Morey and Moloney's performances, saying they "did us proud, as we knew they would." She said the moment when Toadie learned his wife did not have long to live was "easily the most powerful Neighbours has ever seen, but in true Rebecchi style there was [sic] also some light-hearted moments between the pair during the episode, reminding us why we love Sonya and Toadie so much." Crick concluded that Sonya "was given the unforgettable send off that she deserves". A reporter for The Sydney Morning Herald felt Sonya's death was not as impactful as Molly Jones's (Anne Tenney) in fellow soap A Country Practice, but said it was "certainly a milestone" and found the cast and crew did it justice. The reporter added that Morey and Maloney "traversed the last hours of Sonia's [sic] life with dignity, humour, and as much honesty as you can expect from a family-friendly prime-time soap."

Daniel Kilkelly of Digital Spy opened his review writing, "Gut-wrenching, tragic and incredibly difficult to watch – not descriptions you'd see for most episodes of sunshine soap Neighbours. But with the Aussie show killing off one of its most beloved characters today (March 5), we really wouldn't have expected anything less". He thought the episode was "a fitting send-off" for the character, and the two-hander format allowed the audience to see the couple at their best. Kilkelly also praised Morey and Moloney's acting. He said Moloney had given "the performance of his career". He also praised the cinematography, Kendall's direction, and the "sensational script" from Herbison. Kilkelly concluded by writing, "Take a bow, Eve – your final episode, featuring performances on a par with any high-end drama, has shown exactly why everyone thinks they were mad to let you go".

Herbison won the Best Script for a Television Serial accolade at the 2019 Australian Writers' Guild Awards. The following year, Kendall won Best Direction of a TV or SVOD Drama Serial at the Australian Directors Guild Awards for her work on the episode.
