= Asher Yasbincek =

Australian actress

- Born: 2000 or 2001 (age 25–26); Perth, Western Australia, Australia
- Occupation: Actress
- Years active: 2019–present

Asher Yasbincek is an Australian actress, known for her role as Harper McLean in the Netflix series Heartbreak High. Yasbincek made her television debut in the recurring role of Rose in serial drama The Heights. She then appeared in the comedy-drama film Rams (2020) and had a supporting role in How to Please a Woman (2022). Yasbincek secured her breakthrough role in Heartbreak High while she was working in traffic control. She shaved her head on-screen for the role in one of her first scenes. For her portrayal of Harper, Yasbincek received a nomination for the AACTA Audience Choice Award for Best Actress. She also stars in the four-part miniseries Riptide as Hannah Lane.

== Early life ==
Yasbincek was born in Perth, and she attended Mount Lawley Senior High School. She wanted to become an actor after appearing in a school play as "an evil enchanter with a cackling laugh" when she was six years old. She found that she became addicted to having an audience laugh with her. As of 2022, Yasbincek lives in Melbourne.

== Career ==
Yasbincek made her television debut in the Australian serial drama The Heights, playing the recurring role of Rose. Yasbincek found the role "extremely enjoyable", as she was allowed to play with the character and experience her growth alongside the audience. Yasbincek's made her feature film debut in Jeremy Sims' 2020 comedy-drama Rams, which was filmed in Western Australia and stars Sam Neill and Michael Caton. She guested in an episode of The Wilds, and has a supporting role as Chloe in How to Please a Woman (2022).

Yasbincek stars as Harper McLean in the 2022 Netflix comedy-drama series Heartbreak High, which is a reboot of the 1994 series. Yasbincek's character Harper breaks up with her friend Amerie Wadia (Ayesha Madon) at the start of the series, while their map detailing the sexual exploits of the students in their year at school goes viral. Yasbincek was working in traffic control when she was cast as Harper. She admitted to "binging" almost all of the original series after joining the reboot. Her character has a buzz cut and the actress shaved her head on-screen in one of the first scenes she filmed for the series. She told Clare Rigden of The West Australian that it "100 per cent" helped her get into character. Describing Harper, she stated "On surface level, Harper seems to be really aggressive and quite angry, and that's not untrue, but I think it's her shield that she’s putting up. As the series progresses, you get to see a little bit more of what's underneath that." For her role in Heartbreak High, Yasbincek received a nomination for the AACTA Audience Choice Award for Best Actress, along with her co-stars Ayesha Madon and Chloe Hayden. The Daily Telegraph named Yasbincek as one of their Breakout Aussie Stars of 2022 for her role.

Yasbincek played Hannah Lane in the four-part British-Australian miniseries Riptide in 2022. She was reunited with her mentor, director and actor Scott Major, who played Rivers in both versions of Heartbreak High. In 2024, she received a nomination for the AACTA Award for Best Guest or Supporting Actress in a Television Drama for her portrayal of Harper in the second season of Heartbreak High. The following year she appeared in Justin Lin's biographical drama film Last Days.

In February 2026, Yasbincek joined the supporting cast of the Netflix series Breakers as Maggie. She also reprised her role of Harper for the third and final season of Heartbreak High in March 2026. She admitted that it was hard to say goodbye to the on-set friendships she had made and to her character, stating "She was the first character I spent that much time with. But she really does feel like a person separate to me. When I think about her, I hope she's doing well."

== Filmography ==
Year	Title	Role	Notes
2019–2020	The Heights	Rose	Recurring role
2020	Rams	Sally	Feature film
2022	The Wilds	Julia	Episode: "Day 50/33"
2022	How to Please a Woman	Chloe	Feature film
2022–2026	Heartbreak High	Harper McLean	Main cast
2022	Riptide	Hannah Lane	Miniseries
2025	Last Days	Honore	Feature film
