= Jason Herbison =

Australian writer and author

- Born: 1972 (age 53–54)
- Occupations: Television producer; screenwriter; novelist

Jason Herbison (born 1972) is an Australian television producer, screenwriter, journalist and novelist. He has worked as a scriptwriter on several Australian television dramas and serials, including Neighbours, Home and Away, Paradise Beach, Pacific Drive and Always Greener. Herbison also wrote for Australian television magazine TV Week and spent fifteen years writing for British soap opera magazine Inside Soap. He has written several fiction novels, including Living Famously co-written with actress Melissa Bell. After becoming a producer on Neighbours in 2013, Herbison was promoted to executive producer and remained in the role until the show was cancelled in 2025. He has also created and written four dramas for Channel 5 and Network 10, including Lie With Me (2021), Heat (2023) and The Imposter (2025). He won the AWGIE Award for Best Script for a Television Serial in 2016 and 2019.

== Career ==
After leaving high school, Herbison was hired to work on the Australian soap opera Neighbours in the writing room. He later joined the writing team of fellow soap opera Home and Away. He has also worked as a scriptwriter for Australian television series Flipper, Paradise Beach, Pacific Drive, Echo Point, Breakers, Above the Law, Always Greener and Out of the Blue, as well as New Zealand soap opera Shortland Street.

For 15 years in the 1990s and early 2000s, Herbison worked for British soap opera magazine Inside Soap as its Australian correspondent. He also continued working on various serial dramas, recalling "It was a lot of juggling. At one stage, I had the back half of my house in Sydney set up as a photo studio, and had soap stars coming and going all the time. I was in my late 20s, so it was a very social environment, and I got all the gossip – which I loved. Most actors were terrific fun and some very naughty!" He also wrote for Australian television magazine TV Week. Herbison co-wrote the fiction novel Living Famously with actress Melissa Bell, which was published in November 1995. In 1998, his three-in-one book Bondi Place was published by Hodder Headline.

Herbison took over the role of producer on Neighbours from Alan Hardy in 2013. On 4 December 2013, it was confirmed that Herbison had been promoted to series producer, succeeding Richard Jasek. He developed the spin-off series Erinsborough High. He continued writing episodes for Neighbours and remained in the role of executive producer until the show ended in 2025.

Herbison created the 2021 miniseries Lie With Me starring Brett Tucker and Charlie Brooks. The series was commissioned by Network 10 in Australia and Channel 5 in the UK. It was filmed in Melbourne. Following the success of Lie With Me, Herbison created and co-wrote two further dramas Riptide and Heat for Network 10 and Channel 5. In 2025, Herbison created the four-part drama The Imposter, starring Jackie Woodburne and Kym Marsh, for 5 and Paramount.

== Select TV credits ==
- Neighbours (1990–92, 1998–2002, 2010–2025) – writer, storyliner, script producer, producer, series producer, executive producer
- Shortland Street (1991, 2010) – writer
- Paradise Beach (1993–1994) – writer
- Home and Away (1995, 2004–2008, 2012) – writer, script editor
- Flipper (1995)
- Echo Point (1995)
- Pacific Drive (1996) – writer
- Breakers (1998–1999) – writer
- Above the Law (2000) – writer
- Always Greener (2001–2003) – writer
- Out of the Blue (2008) – script producer, writer
- Rescue Special Ops (2009) – writer, story producer
- Lie With Me (2021) – writer, executive producer
- Riptide (2022) – writer
- Heat (2023) – writer
- The Imposter (2025) – writer, creator, executive producer

== Novels ==
- Living Famously (co-written with Melissa Bell, 1995)
- And the Winner Is (1996)
- The Big Break (1996)
- Bondi Place (1998)
- Chart Sensation (1998)
- The Cruellest Cut (1996)
- Money Talks (1998)
- The Price of Fame (1998)

== Accolades ==
Herbison has been nominated for five AWGIE Awards, including four during his Neighbours tenure, and has won two.

Year	Category	Nominated work	Result	Ref
2016	Best Script for a Television Serial	Neighbours – "Episode 7202"	Won	
2019	Best Script for a Television Serial	Neighbours – "Episode 8052"	Won	
2021	Best Script for a Television Serial	Neighbours – "Episode 8498"	Nominated	
2022	Best Script for Television – Limited Series	Lie with Me (with Margaret Wilson and Anthony Ellis)	Nominated	
2023	Best Script for a Television Serial	Neighbours – "Episode 8903"	Nominated	
