= Kate Kendall =

British-born Australian actress and director (born 1973)

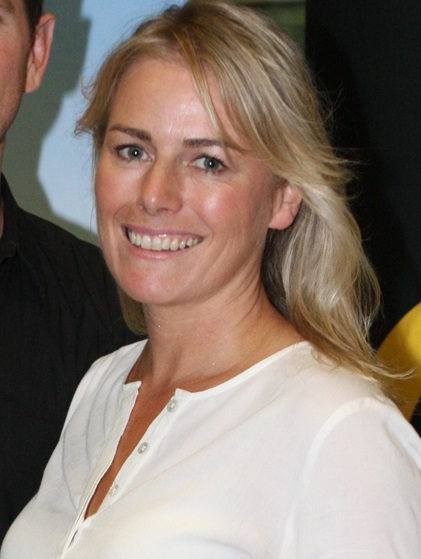
- Kendall at a rehearsal for An Officer and a Gentleman in 2012
- Born: 1973 (age 52–53); England, United Kingdom
- Occupations: Actress, director
- Years active: 1997–present
- Known for: Angie Piper in Stingers; Lauren Turner in Neighbours
- Spouse: Wayne Johnston
- Children: 1

Kate Kendall is a British-born Australian actress and director. She played Angie Piper in the long-running Nine Network Australian drama Stingers from 1998 to 2004. Kendall has appeared in television series The Librarians (2007), Rush (2010) and Conspiracy 365. She joined the cast of television soap opera Neighbours in 2013 as Lauren Turner. After leaving the role in 2017, Kendall became a director, and later producer, on the serial.

== Early life and education ==
Kendall was born in England and moved to Australia with her family when she was six months old. Her father, David Kendall, was prominent in the Pram Factory and La Mama Theatres in Melbourne, and, after moving to Adelaide, with the State Theatre Company of South Australia (STCSA) in the 1980s. In Adelaide, he also headed the new acting course at the Centre for Performing Arts (CPA) (now the Adelaide College of the Arts) in 1987.

Kate studied at the CPA in Adelaide.

== Career ==
=== Stage ===
On the stage, Kendall played Rebecca in Solstice for STCSA in Adelaide, Hermia in A Midsummer Night's Dream and Cinderella in Into the Woods in Melbourne Botanic Gardens.

In 2011 Kendall played the lead role of Diana in MTC’s production of Next to Normal and appeared in the Australian musical premiere of An Officer and a Gentleman.

She has performed in other stage productions at the Adelaide Festival Centre, the Carlton Courthouse and Budinski's Theatre in Melbourne. With the Aboriginal youth company, Jumpback Theatre, she has worked with female prisoners.

=== Screen ===
Kendall had bit parts in television series Home and Away and Neighbours before scoring a guest role as Rosie Burgess in Blue Heelers in 1997. Her breakthrough television role was as Angie Piper in Stingers, a role she played for 192 episodes from 1998 to 2004.

Kendall played a minor role as Lisa in 2007 American miniseries The Starter Wife and the same year, appeared in three episodes of comedy series The Librarians, as Jacinta McSweeney. Kendall appeared on the Australian police drama Rush in 2010. She then played Emily Ormond in the twelve-part drama series Conspiracy 365, which was based on the book of the same name.

Kendall took over the role of Lauren Turner on Neighbours in 2013. As she was wrapping up the role of Lauren in 2017, she began directing small scenes. She has since directed numerous episodes of the series. In June 2020, it was announced that Kendall would become a producer. She covered for series producer Natalie Lynch, while she was on maternity leave. David Knox of TV Tonight believed Kendall was the show's first actor, director, producer.

Kendall directed the 2023 four-part series Heat, created by Jason Herbison. On 21 July 2025, it was announced that she would be a director for a new co-commission alongside Herbison, called Imposter.

== Personal life ==
Kendall married former Carlton Football Club AFL player Wayne Johnston and as of 2014 has a son and four stepchildren.

She enjoys horse-riding and is a fan of country music and cricket. She was a supporter of Greenpeace.

== Filmography ==
=== Television ===
==== As actor ====
Year	Title	Role	Notes
1997	Blue Heelers	Rosie Burgess	1 episode
1998–2004	Stingers	Angie Piper	192 episodes
1999	Farscape	Sergeant (uncredited)	1 episode
2000	On the Beach	Jenny Albani	TV movie
2007	The Starter Wife	Lisa	3 episodes
2007	The Librarians	Jacinta McSweeney	3 episodes
2009	City Homicide	Jacinta Hansard	1 episode
2010	The Pacific	Betty Leckie	Miniseries, 1 episode
2010	Rush	Nicolette	1 episode
2012	Conspiracy 365	Emily Ormond	12 episodes
2013–2018; 2022	Neighbours	Lauren Carpenter / Lauren Turner	523 episodes

==== As director / producer ====
Year	Title	Role	Notes
2017–2025	Neighbours	Mentor director	178 episodes
2019–2022	Neighbours	Producer	897 episodes
2019	Playing for Keeps	Director	2 episodes
2023	Heat	Director	4 episodes
2025	Imposter	Director	Miniseries, 4 episodes
2026	Home and Away	Director	4 episodes

=== Film ===
==== As actor ====
Year	Title	Role	Notes	Ref.
1999	Dead End	Fantasy couple		
2007	St. George		Short film	
2008	Belladonna	Katherine		
2008	Night Train		Short film	
2010	Matching Jack	Registrar		
2012	10 Terrorists	Detective June Connor		

==== As director ====
Year	Title	Role	Notes
TBA	Six Months	Director	

=== Theatre ===
==== As actor ====
Year	Title	Role	Notes	Ref.
	Into the Woods	Cinderella	Royal Botanic Gardens Melbourne	
	Miss Julie	Miss Julie		
	As You Like It	Rosalind		
	Dust			
	Chicago			
	The Vagina Monologues			
1994	King Golgrutha / Dust / The Garden of Earthly Delights		Vision Warehouse, Adelaide	
1995	Galax-Arena		Playhouse, Adelaide	
1996	Solstice	Rebecca	The Amphitheatre, Adelaide with STCSA	
1996	Dark Heart		Small Price Theatre, Adelaide	
1997	A Midsummer Night's Dream	Hermia	Royal Botanic Gardens Melbourne with Australian Shakespeare Company	
1997	The Secret Death of Salvador Dali		Budinskis Theatre of Exile, Melbourne	
2000	Art and Soul: Untitled	Woman	Fairfax Studio, Melbourne with MTC	
2005	Cheech, or, The Chrysler Guys Are in Town	Stephanie	Fairfax Studio, Melbourne with MTC	
2005	Much Ado About Nothing	Beatrice	Royal Botanic Gardens Melbourne with Australian Shakespeare Company	
2007	Homer's Iliad		Stork Hotel, Melbourne	
2007	The Lover	Marguerite	Stork Hotel, Melbourne	
2008	Kitten	Kitten	Malthouse Theatre, Melbourne	
2010	Furious Mattress	Else	Malthouse Theatre, Melbourne	
2010	Richter/Meinhof-Opera	Ulrike Meinhof	Australian Centre for Contemporary Art, Melbourne	
2011	Next to Normal	Diana	Playhouse, Melbourne with MTC	
2012	An Officer and a Gentleman	Lynette Pomeroy	Sydney Lyric Theatre with The Gordon Frost Organisation	
2013	Into the Woods	The Baker’s Wife		
2013	Gaybies		Sumner Theatre, Melbourne with MTC for Midsumma Festival	
2015	Frankie and Johnny in the Clair de Lune	Frankie	Fortyfivedownstairs, Melbourne	
2018	Homer’s Odyssey (Part 6: The Return of the King)	Reader	MPavilion, Melbourne with Stork Theatre	

==== As director ====
Year	Title	Role	Notes	Ref.
2010	Marcel & Albertine	Director	Alliance Francaise, Melbourne with Stork Theatre	

== Awards ==
Year	Work	Award	Category	Result	Ref.
2004	Stingers	Logie Awards	Silver Logie for Most Outstanding Actress in a Drama Series	Nominated	
2014	Neighbours	Equity Ensemble Awards	Outstanding Performance by an Ensemble in a Drama Series	Nominated	
2020	Neighbours	Australian Directors' Guild Award	Best Director of TV or SVOD Drama Serial	Won	
