= Anthony Ellis (writer) =

Australian television writer

Anthony Ellis is a Welsh-Australian writer and executive best known for his work in television. He was a script assistant and writer during the early years on Home and Away.

He was Channel Nine's Network Script Executive for a number of years.

He helped develop Packed to the Rafters, which he script produced for a number of years.

He is currently Head of Scripted Content for Fremantle Media Australia.

== Select credits ==
- Home and Away - writer, script assistant, story editor
- Family and Friends (1990) - script editor
- The Miraculous Mellops (1991) - writer
- The Adventures of Skippy (1992) - writer
- Ship to Shore (1994) - writer
- Mirror, Mirror (1995) - script editor, story editor, writer
- Snowy River: The McGregor Saga (1996) - writer
- Water Rats (1996) - writer
- Blue Heelers (1996–97) - writer
- Big Sky (1997) - writer
- All Saints - writer
- Always Greener (2001–03) - writer
- McLeod's Daughters - writer, story consultant, network script executive
- The Eggs (2004) - network script executive
- Mortified (2006–07) - network script executive
- The Sleepover Club (2006–07) - network script executive
- Lockie Leonard (2007) - network script executive
- Packed to the Rafters - co-developed by, writer, script producer, script editor
