= Margaret Wilson (Australian writer) =

Australian television writer

Margaret Wilson is an Australian television writer, who has also worked as a script editor and script producer. She currently works as a writer for Home and Away and Neighbours. Wilson won an AWGIE Award for Best Script for a Television Serial in 2008. She was also nominated in the same category the 2014 AWGIE Awards for her work on "Episode 6820" of Neighbours.

== Select credits ==
- Water Rats
- Home and Away 1995–present
- Neighbours 1998–2002, 2013–2022
- Out of the Blue
- All Saints
- Packed to the Rafters 2008–2013
- McLeod's Daughters
- Always Greener
