= Yashvi Rebecchi =

Fictional character from Neighbours

- Neighbours character
- Portrayed by: Olivia Junkeer
- Duration: 2017–2023
- First appearance: 24 April 2017
- Last appearance: 16 November 2023
- Introduced by: Jason Herbison
- Spin-off appearances: Neighbours: Erinsborough High (2019)
In-universe information
- Occupation: High school student; Waitress; Police constable
- Father: Shane Rebecchi
- Mother: Dipi Rebecchi
- Brothers: Jay Rebecchi
- Sisters: Kirsha Rebecchi
- Grandmothers: Angie Rebecchi
- Uncles: Toadie Rebecchi
- Aunts: Mishti Sharma
- First cousins: Callum Rebecchi; Nell Rebecchi; Hugo Somers
- Other relatives: Dylan Timmins

Yashvi Rebecchi is a fictional character from the Australian television soap opera Neighbours, played by Olivia Junkeer. She was created when producers struggled to find the right male actor to play the Rebecchis' son, which resulted in them changing the character's gender at the last moment. Yashvi was introduced along with her parents, sister and aunt as part of an expansion of the serial's Rebecchi family. Junkeer auditioned for the role shortly after finishing her last year of school. She doubted she would win the part, as the producers thought she was too old for the role. However, she learned she had been cast in December 2016 and she started on set the following month. Junkeer was pleased to be representing fellow women of colour on Australian television and said her on-screen family represented her own mixed-race family. She made her first appearance in the episode broadcast on 24 April 2017. Junkeer also played the role in the 2019 spin-off series Erinsborough High.

Yashvi was initially portrayed as a confident, opportunistic, rebellious teenager. Junkeer also called her head strong and feisty, while praising her open vulnerability. Junkeer enjoyed having the opportunity to explore Yashvi's development from 15 to 18 years old. Early storylines for the character saw the introduction of her first love interest, Evan Lewis (Joe Klocek), who she later learns has been trolling a neighbour online. Yashvi later pursues a career in the AFLW, a story in which writers also explored racism, as Yahsvi is bullied by a teammate. Junkeer said the storyline was one of her favourites and felt that it reflected society. A romantic relationship was later established between Yashvi and Ned Willis (Ben Hall), which proved divisive among viewers because of the age gap between them. This was later used as a plot device when Scarlett Brady (Christie Whelan Browne) developed an obsession with Ned and manipulated the couple into breaking up. Junkeer said the storyline sees Yashvi at her most vulnerable. The storyline comes to a climax during episodes set at Halloween when Scarlett stabs both Ned and Yashvi, who attempts to rescue him.

After airing a reconciliation for the pair, producers reintroduced Scarlett in October 2020. Scarlett frames Ned for her murder, which leads to him and Yashvi staging a fake wedding to lure her out of hiding. Junkeer enjoyed playing a bride, but she was not keen for Ned and Yashvi to marry for real, as she liked playing out the unpredictable nature of their relationship. Writers broke the couple up for good in June 2021 after Ned develops a connection with Sheila Canning (Shareena Clanton). Outside of her relationship plots, Yashvi joins the police force and is paired with Levi Canning (Richie Morris). Junkeer felt the development was a natural progression for the character. Yashvi and Levi investigate a drug dealing network and learn Detective Dax Braddock (Dean Kirkright) is involved, which leads to a siege at the local high school, where Dax holds Yashvi and several other characters hostage. Yashvi is later involved in a high speed car chase and crash while pursuing two suspects. The crash is one of the biggest stunts filmed for the show in recent history. Junkeer announced her departure from Neighbours in July 2021. She cited a desire to pursue new roles and the exits of her on-screen family as her reasons for leaving. Her final scenes were broadcast on 13 July 2021, however she later returned in July 2022 for the show's then finale. Junkeer reprised the role once again in 2023, following the show's return.

== Creation and casting ==
Yashvi was introduced as part of an expansion of the serial's Rebecchi family, which began with the return of Shane Rebecchi (Nicholas Coghlan) after 22 years. She was created after producers struggled to find the right actor to play the Rebecchis' son. Sharon Johal, who plays matriarch Dipi Rebecchi, explained that the family were meant to have a son and a daughter upon their introduction, but after being unable to find the right boy for the role, producers changed the character's gender at the last moment. Of the new family, the show's executive producer Jason Herbison stated "Shane Rebecchi is one of the great untapped characters from Neighbours history. I'm delighted to welcome him back to Ramsay Street along with his beautiful wife, two children and sister-in-law, it's a great new chapter of the Rebecchi family." The Rebecchis are an Indian-Australian family. Herbison and the other producers believed it was important that they "reflect the cultural diversity of the community and our audience."

Actress Olivia Junkeer was 17 when she was cast as Yashvi, which marks her first television role. She auditioned shortly after finishing her last year of school. Junkeer admitted "I didn't think much of it because the chances of landing an audition are extremely slim. I was more focused on my end of year celebrations." She received a callback as she was about to leave for Byron Bay with her friends. During the callback, Junkeer acted out scenes alongside Coghlan and Ryan Moloney, who plays Yashvi's uncle Toadfish Rebecchi. In conversation with co-star Takaya Honda, Junkeer recalled that she was asked about her hair and from that she knew that the producers thought she was too old for the role, as Yashvi was meant to be 15.

Junkeer was cast in December 2016. She initially thought she had lost the role, after not hearing anything back about her audition. Her agent later contacted her to say she was still in the running and a couple of days later, she learned she had won the role. Junkeer told Honda that it did not feel real until she got to the set the following month. She was grateful to receive the role because she was unsure about her plans after school. She felt like "the luckiest girl in the world" to get the opportunity to appear in an iconic show, and believed it was an incredible "training ground" for her acting career. She also liked that she had "the luxury" of representing fellow women of colour on television in Australia, and thought her on-screen family represented her own mixed-race family. She commented: "This issue is really important to me, because at the moment and throughout my childhood there was a serious lack of cultural diversity on our screens. I love that my little cousins can watch me and see someone that looks like them." Junkeer made her debut as Yashvi on 24 April 2017.

== Development ==
=== Characterisation ===
Yashvi is Shane and Dipi Rebecchi's (Sharon Johal) eldest child. She is introduced alongside her parents, aunt Mishti Sharma (Scarlet Vas), and youngest sibling Kirsha Rebecchi (Vani Dhir). Junkeer called the Rebecchis "the best family to be a part of". She liked that they were a big family and said Dhir felt like her own little sister, while Johal was like her mother. Yashvi was initially billed as "a boisterous troublemaker who's fearless and confident", which is in total contrast to her shy and better behaved sister. Her character description also stated that Yashvi enjoys showing off and being the "centre of attention", which often gets her into trouble at school and leaves her parents exasperated at her behaviour. The description concluded that she is more of an "opportunist" than a "bad girl" or "schemer". In keeping with Rebecchi family tradition, Yashvi has a fish nickname – Clownfish. As Junkeer is three years older than Yashvi, producers debated giving her bangs to make her seem younger, but they styled her hair into plaits instead which Yashvi wore for the first couple of years. Junkeer later described her character as "a rebellious, outspoken and ambitious teenager." She enjoyed portraying Yashvi's feisty side and found that her character's restless nature kept her active. She also admitted to being challenged by Yashvi's passion for AFL, as she is not a sporty person.

Yashvi is shown to be "openly vulnerable" and often shares her "struggles and her feelings" with those around her, even though it sometimes leads to trouble. Junkeer called her "reckless" and "head strong", but not someone who has bad intentions. In 2019, Junkeer commented on how much busier she had become since her arrival and how her character had grown. She said "When I first started, for the first couple of years, I was always there but never as involved. But now I am, I really enjoy it. It makes it so much more enjoyable and makes me more motivated. To be able to show such different stories constantly – and explore Yashvi developing from 15 to 18 – has been amazing." She found that her later storylines also showed "the growth in Yashvi's moral compass". Junkeer also called for the introduction of Yashvi's brother Jay Rebecchi, believing that another male presence in the Rebecchi home would "settle" Kirsha, Yashvi and Dipi down, as well as create some drama for Yashvi. Producers later cast Dhruv Malge in the role and he said his character's arrival "changes the entire atmosphere in the family", which has "a good impact" on them all. Junkeer later said that in her third year on the show, her character "keeps me on my toes, and I adore playing her!" She added that Yashvi's choice to join the police force had contributed to her "journey of self discovery".

=== Early storylines ===
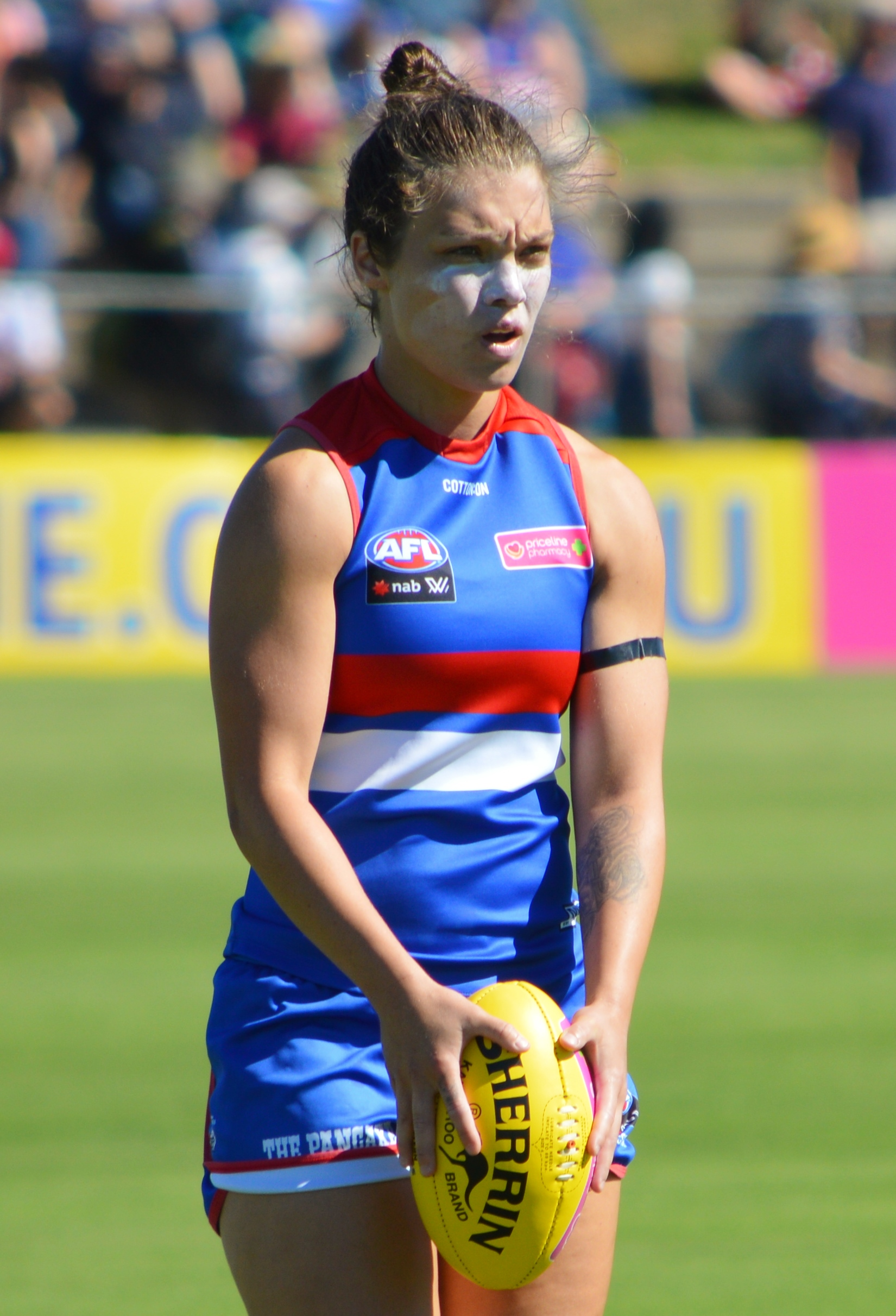
Western Bulldogs player Ellie Blackburn (pictured) made a cameo for Yashvi's AFLW storyline.

One of the character's early storylines saw the introduction of her first love interest, mechanic Evan Lewis (Joe Klocek) in July 2017. Evan starts working at the local garage and becomes a rival for Yashvi's neighbour Ben Kirk (Felix Mallard). Yashvi learns that she and Evan share a passion for BMX bikes and she attempts to go "all-out" to get his attention, but has "mixed success." The story leads to Yashvi and Ben forging a friendship when he offers to matchmake her and Evan. Yashvi and Evan's budding romance ends after "a disastrous date" in which Yashvi learns Evan has been abusing Piper Willis (Mavournee Hazel) online. Neela Debnath of the Daily Express said Yashvi was "understandably" upset and after confronting Evan, it appears that she has struck him with his own car.

Yashvi later expresses an interest in football and decides to pursue a career in the AFLW. Western Bulldogs player Ellie Blackburn makes a cameo appearance as she meets with Yashvi to give her advice. Of the storyline, Junkeer commented: "It couldn't be a more exciting time for my character to take up AFL, particularly with amazing players like Ellie Blackburn paving the way for young girls wanting to pursue their passion on the field." Dipi is initially "terrified" that Yashvi will get injured, but eventually relents. When a recruiter for the women's league comes to watch Yashvi play, her parents opt not to tell her, so she will not be nervous. However, during the match Dipi punches Jake Hendra (Guy Greenstone) in the face, causing Yashvi to miss a kick and lose the game. A Soaplife writer observed that Yashvi was "fuming" with her mother, especially after learning that a scout was there for her.

Writers also used the football storyline to explore the issue of racism, as Yahsvi is racially bullied by her teammate Marisa Taylor (Shannon Barker). Of how this affects her, Claire Crick of Soaplife explained "When Yashvi's skills on the pitch aren't up to scratch, it's clear Marisa's racial slurs are taking their toll. And to make matters worse, Yashvi's family have no idea." Yashvi hides the bullying from her family when they are named the Faces of Lassiters Hotel and have to take part in a Christmas-in-July photo shoot. But when Yashvi wins an award at a football fundraiser, she fails to collect her trophy and Dipi finds her crying in a bathroom. Yashvi admits the truth about Marisa and after a meeting with her coach, Marisa is asked to leave the team. Junkeer said the storyline was one of her favourites and important to her. She felt that it reflected society and was so well written that she did not need to add to it.

=== Relationship with Ned Willis ===
Writers later established a romantic relationship between Yashvi and Ned Willis (Ben Hall). The story arc began in September 2018 when Yashvi develops "an inappropriate crush" on Ned after saving his life. As a thank you for rescuing him from a sauna, Ned offers to help Yashvi with her football training which leads to Yashvi "getting a little too attached" to him. Her crush does not got unnoticed, as Kirsha realises her sister has feelings for Ned. After Toadie helps to hide her crush from Ned, Yashvi vows to move past her crush. Ned was dating Yashvi's best friend Bea Nilsson at the time and her portrayer Bonnie Anderson explained her point of view to Inside Soap's Alice Penwill, saying "Bea is actually very unaware of Yashvi's crush, which is odd as they're best friends. I suppose Bea doesn't like someone else having eyes for the guy she's falling for, especially as she and Yashvi are friends. But they'll work it out!" The following year, Ned and Bea break up. Not long after, Yashvi spontaneously kisses Ned, who pulls away and insists that he just wants to be friends as he is still getting over Bea. Eventually, Ned and Yashvi start a relationship, which is tested straight away by Yashvi's eagerness to tell everyone and Shane's negative reaction, while Ned wants to take things at a slower pace. He also cancels their first proper date, where Yashvi had planned to lose her virginity to him, leaving her feeling "incredibly insecure".

Hall dubbed Ned and Yashvi's relationship "a slowburner". He told What's on TV's Simon Timblick that Ned can see from the time they have spent together that Yashvi has "grown-up a bit." He continued, "She makes him laugh and she's easy to be with. Whereas Ned's ex-girlfriend Bea Nilsson was always a bit of troubled soul and Ned was always trying to help fix her. With Yashvi it's fun and it's much easier." Despite the couple earning the portmanteau of Nashvi online, Hall admitted that viewer reaction to the couple was "pretty divided". He noted that the majority of the audience preferred Ned with Bea, however, he was a fan of Nashvi and thought the relationship was "more fun and healthy for Ned." One of the reasons for the audience opposition to the pairing was Yashvi's age. Hall later cleared up the confusion on Twitter, explaining that there is a six-year gap between the characters, with Ned being 24 or 25 years old, while Yashvi is 18. The age gap was later raised on-screen when Scarlett Brady (Christie Whelan Browne) tries to use it to break the couple up. Hall thought that it was clever writing, as it reflected similar views about the gap from the audience. As the couple start to have doubts about their relationship, Scarlett uses this to her advantage to try and manipulate them both.

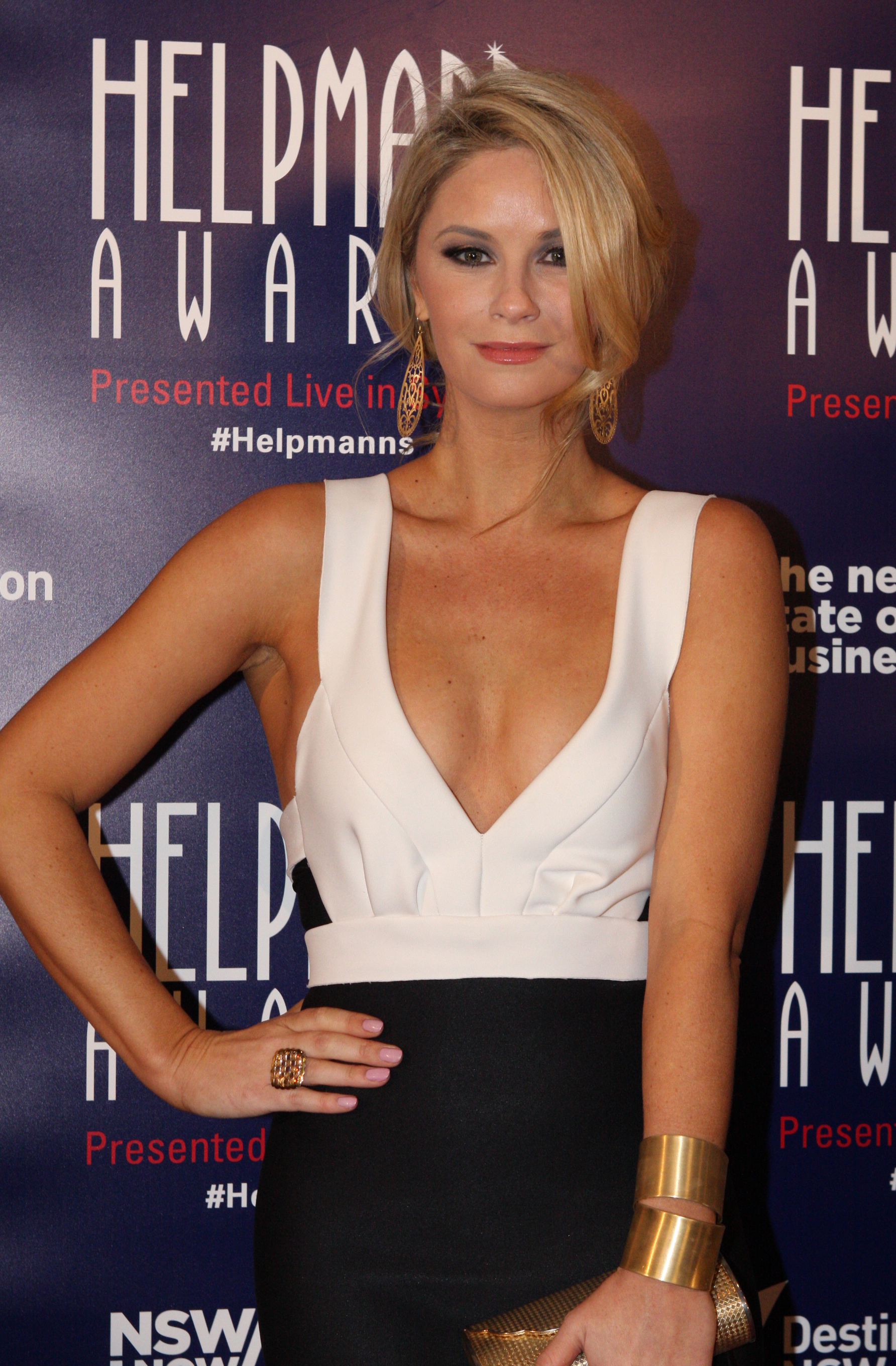
Ned and Yashvi's relationship is severely tested by Scarlett Brady (Christie Whelan-Browne pictured), who develops an obsession with Ned.

Scarlett succeeds in breaking up the couple by fooling Yashvi into thinking she and Ned have had sex. Speaking to Alice Penwill of Inside Soap Junkeer told her that Yashvi believed Scarlett was romantically interested in Ned, but she did not think Scarlett would pursue him. She said that her character was "easily intimidated by other women" and she was initially jealous of Scarlett. Bea persuades Yashvi to talk with Ned, but she walks in on him asleep alongside a partially dressed Scarlett. She later confronts Ned and ends their relationship. Of Yashvi's reasoning for the break up, Junkeer told Penwill "Ned is Yashvi's safe haven, and her escape. Although, there have been lots of ups and downs in their relationship, and in her mind, Ned breaks her heart. So technically, Yashvi doesn't see it as her ending anything. She believes that this is all coming from him, and that this is what he wants." She also said viewers would see Yashvi "at her most vulnerable" as she struggles with her first break up. Junkeer reckoned that Scarlett had caused enough damage to Ned and Yashvi's relationship that they might not be able reconcile, but if they did they would be stronger than before. She added that she was a fan of the couple and thought they complemented each other.

Scarlett's obsession with Ned comes to a climax at Halloween when she stabs him and Yashvi. Whelan Browne explained to Claire Crick of What's on TV that Scarlett realises Yashvi is on to her after learning Yashvi talked to her former fiancé, who called her dangerous. From that point, Scarlett knows that she needs to get Ned out of Erinsborough so they can be together. The pair end up in a maze, where Scarlett turns aggressive and stabs Ned. Yashvi and Bea turn up shortly after and Scarlett also ends up stabbing Yashvi. Whelan Browne said Scarlett lashes out at Yashvi "because of all the anger she feels towards her." The episodes were filmed on location at a maze an hour away from the set. Junkeer named the plot as the "most exciting storyline" she had been part of, saying "It was Halloween, and we filmed in a maze. The episode had costumes, knives, lots of blood, it was great! I was stabbed, and I got to take down the villain. As you can imagine, I was pretty pleased that I got to do that one." In the aftermath of his stabbing, Ned struggles to cope and is plagued by nightmares, which culminates in him hitting Yashvi when she attempts to wake him, leaving her "distressed". She later berates him for their break up and his betrayal.

Neighbours aired a reconciliation for Ned and Yashvi at the end of 2019. The following year saw Yashvi support Ned as he opened his own art exhibition space and encourage him to join online content subscription service, Fandangle, to make money. In October 2020, producers reintroduced Scarlett. Ned realises she has been contacting him through Fandangle and she later threatens to release his images to everyone. Junkeer praised the return of Scarlett and said the first half of the storyline was fun to play out, but the second half would take a dark turn. She told Kilkelly (Digital Spy): "The Fandangle scenes were a lot of fun at the time and a bit silly! It was fun for Ben and I to play the ridiculousness of that whole thing, but it does go down a sinister path pretty fast as Scarlett comes back into the picture because of it. Scarlett uses Fandangle to manipulate and blackmail Ned, which triggers his post-traumatic stress disorder from the stabbing and everything else that happened a year ago. The timing works out really well, because the stabbing episode happened around Halloween last year and you see Scarlett now return to Erinsborough around that time. It brings Yashvi and Ned down memory lane."

Scarlett frames Ned for her murder, so Yashvi suggests they stage a fake wedding to lure her out of hiding and prevent Ned from being sent to prison. Junkeer explained to Inside Soap's Sarah Ellis that Scarlett would find it "unbearable" to see Yashvi and Ned together and the couple know that Scarlett would be unable to resist doing something about it. Despite the amount of evidence against Ned, he continues to deny killing Scarlett and Yashvi believes him, after some initial hesitation, and she is determined to go ahead with the "risky" plan to help clear his name. Junkeer stated "Yashvi is hoping to expose Scarlett for the dangerous woman she is. Scarlett is unhinged, so they know she's capable of anything – she's proven this in the past. But Yashvi also hopes that Scarlett can finally get the help that she needs." To make the wedding seem real, Ned and Yashvi dress up and hold the ceremony at Lassiters Lake, where they begin reciting their vows. Junkeer said Yashvi is "caught up" listening to Ned's vows when Scarlett turns up, taking her by surprise. Scarlett runs towards the couple with a jar of acid, but is tackled to the ground by Levi and the acid burns her face. Junkeer told Ellis "It's not until afterwards that Yashvi is able to process what's just happened." The actress also told Ellis that despite filming the ceremony on a cold day, she was excited by the shoot and her first time playing a bride. She admitted that she was not keen for Ned and Yashvi to marry for real, as she liked the unpredictable nature of their relationship, which she found more interesting to play.

Writers broke the couple up for good in June 2021. The storyline starts with the introduction of Sheila Canning (Shareena Clanton), who bonds with Ned over art. They later share "a charged encounter", which makes them realise there is more to their connection. Hall admitted that the moment with Sheila confuses Ned about their friendship, prompting him to recommit to his relationship with Yashvi. Hall confirmed that Ned's heart lies with Yashvi, but there was a small part of him that wonders if he will be completely "satisfied with someone who doesn't stimulate him creatively." Joe Julians of the Radio Times pointed out to Hall that ever since Ned and Yashvi got together they "have had many issues" and suggested that they were not well suited after all. Hall replied: "I think there's definitely been a lack of connection between the two of them recently. They're both realising what they want from their lives and at the moment the relationship seems to be getting in the way." The break up occurs after Yashvi hears a conversation between Ned and Sheila about their connection and then discovers Ned's sketch of Sheila. A writer for the serial's official website noted that the "emotional toll, constant arguments and drama" leads Yashvi to end the relationship for both their sakes.

=== Police career ===
After graduating from high school, Yashvi decides to join the police force. Rachel Lucas of What's on TV asked Junkeer if Yashvi was always going to join the force, noting that her aunt Mishti was already a police officer, with Junkeer replying "I always felt that Yashvi would be a police officer. When she came into Erinsborough she was so rebellious and always looking for trouble. She really did look up to her auntie, who could tell her what to do when no one else could." She thought it was a natural progression for Yashvi and joked that as soon as she put the uniform on it was "full steam ahead!" Junkeer also liked that Yashvi had a job that needed her to be responsible, but when she takes the uniform off, she could be fun again. She admitted that when she first put on the police uniform, she did not know what to do with her arms. She continued "Nobody talks about it, but it's really uncomfortable; your arms just hang on the outside of this bulletproof vest. So I like to play around a bit – otherwise I look like a walking robot!" Yashvi is paired up with Constable Levi Canning (Richie Morris) and in her first days as a trainee, Yashvi has to arrest her friend and neighbour, Harlow Robinson (Jemma Donovan) for drug possession.

A few months later, Yashvi is drawn into her father's drug addiction storyline. Junkeer liked that the Rebecchis had been given some bigger storylines, having been in the background for a while. She said Shane's drug plot was "a surprise" as he has always been someone that wanted to be looked up to, especially by Yashvi. Speaking to Inside Soap's Alice Penwill, Junkeer told her that Yashvi is "fixated" on solving the drug case, as she has suffered through the consequences with her father's addiction. Yashvi and Levi investigate the sale of drugs at Erinsborough High School and realise that it is just a small part of a wider drug dealing network. They also realise that their superior Detective Dax Braddock (Dean Kirkright) is involved, but their investigation is hampered by a lack of evidence. Yashvi tries to find Shane's dealer River Hanlon (Andrew Coshan), despite Dax telling her not to. Yashvi asks a reluctant Levi for help, and Junkeer told Rachel Lucas of What's on TV: "There's a higher power dictating what she can and can't do, which is when she turns to Levi. Levi comes with her because he's worried she'll get into danger and not because he supports her decision making. Levi and Yashvi hit a dead end in terms of leads. They can't prove if Dax is behind anything and if he's corrupt, so they think that finding the school dealer at Erinsborough High is their only option."

When Yashvi eventually finds River, he has been badly beaten and he names her as his assailant. Dax then suspends Yashvi from the force. Junkeer told Penwill that the suspension means Yashvi has almost nothing to lose now. She reckoned that Yashvi is no longer thinking before she acts and will keep going until there is a good outcome, as she fully trusts her intuition with the case. Yashvi goes to the school to talk to the students and she finds the dealer, which places her in "extreme danger" as Dax then turns up. Junkeer commented that Dax is "pushed to his limits", leading him to hold Yashvi, Susan Kennedy (Jackie Woodburne), Mackenzie Hargreaves (Georgie Stone) and Richie Amblin (Lachie Millar) hostage in a classroom. Junkeer told Lucas that Dax has a taser and becomes violent, which places the hostages' lives in danger. Yashvi manages to free some of the hostages, but two of them are injured. The storyline was filmed during the COVID-19 pandemic and a social distancing policy was implemented on set. Junkeer admitted that things were "pretty hard" while they were filming, but found that it added to the "intensity" of the scenes. The actress did not think the hostage situation and the corruption would put Yashvi off her career in the force, citing the fact that her character enjoys a challenge and would be bored doing another job. She added: "Yashvi didn't expect any of this, but it definitely doesn't turn her off. I think it just makes her more determined. If anything, she feels more accomplished after what happens."

The following year, Yashvi helps Levi investigate Mitch Foster (Kevin Hofbauer) and Nelson Ryker (Rhys Mitchell), a pair of criminals who previously attacked him when he was a young child. After the pair break into Levi's house, Yashvi is left "on edge" and brings Mitch and Nelson in for questioning, but she cannot charge them with any crime and has to let them go. Yashvi and Levi later witness Mitch and Nelson moving some stolen goods, despite Mitch volunteering to work with the police to take Nelson down in return for immunity. This then leads to a high speed car chase as they attempt to bring the pair in, which ends in a crash when Levi swerves to avoid hitting his grandmother Sheila Canning's (Colette Mann) car and flips his own vehicle. The crash is one of the biggest stunts filmed for the show in recent history. Junkeer and Morris had to spend time talking with stunt coordinators ahead of filming and have their lines memorised, as they would not be able to check them once they started the shoot. Morris also explained "We had these harnesses and then they just chucked us in the car upside down and then hooked us up into the seat. It felt unreal." Mann said the accident is "a case of being in the wrong place at the wrong time". After Levi and Yashvi's car comes to a stop, Sheila rushes over to help them. Levi manages to free himself and sets off in pursuit of Mitch and Nelson, while Sheila cares for an injured Yashvi. Mann stated that her character is "in a total flap" as she is concerned for her grandson and Yashvi, who is not in a good way and in a lot of pain. Yashvi is soon rushed to the hospital, while Levi arrests Mitch and Nelson.

=== Departure and returns ===
On 5 July 2021, Junkeer announced her departure from Neighbours. She confirmed that it was her decision to leave and she cited her on-screen family's departure, as well as a desire "to experience something different" as her reasons for leaving. Of her four years in the serial, she stated: "Yashvi has had such a journey. She came to Ramsay Street as a rebellious teen, but walked away a mature, self-assured young woman, similar to my own experience walking onto the set for the first time." Junkeer liked her character's "open ended exit" and said she would consider a return to the show in the future. Johal reprised her role as Dipi to help facilitate Yashvi's departure, following her involvement in the car crash. Yashvi decides to relocate to Sydney to be closer to her family. She leaves Erinsborough with Dipi after attending a farewell party thrown by her friends and family. Junkeer's final scenes aired on 13 July 2021. Afterwards she posted a goodbye message on her social media thanking the cast and crew for supporting her. She also called her time on the show "nothing but a wild dream."

In May 2022, Dan Seddon of Digital Spy confirmed Junkeer was one of over twenty actors reprising their role for the show's then finale, following its cancellation earlier in the year. Yashvi makes her return in the episode broadcast on 22 July in the UK and on 26 July in Australia, as she comes back to Erinsborough for Toadie's wedding. In an interview on the serial's social media pages, Junkeer also confirmed that Yashvi and Ned had "rekindled" in Sydney.

Junkeer returned again in 2023, following the show's revival. Her appearances occur during a week of flashback episodes designed to showcase stories that occurred whilst Neighbours had ceased broadcasting.

== Other appearances ==
In October 2019, Junkeer appeared as Yashvi in the five-part Neighbours spin-off Erinsborough High. Junkeer said the series would be "grittier, darker and more sinister" than the main show, but it would follow the same storylines. She explained that Yashvi would have "the exact same mindset that she does in the main show" and her story at the time would be relevant in the spin-off. She also confirmed that the audience would see her character go through a "a real big change" and become a woman. Junkeer added that the series would relate to teenagers, as it highlights high school issues, social media use, and relationships.

== Reception ==
Aneeta Menon from Indian Link Australia believed the additions of Yashvi and her family to the show reflected society, and was part of a continuing expansion of diversity on Australian television screens. David Knox of TV Tonight also thought the introduction of the family was "another positive step", especially as the show had been criticised for casting mostly Caucasian actors in the past.

When Yashvi pulled a prank for muck up day, Bridget McManus of The Sydney Morning Herald observed that "the legend of Toadfish (Ryan Moloney) lives on at the Erinsborough high school", and thought it was "an attempt to demonstrate that kids will be kids, but not if the grown-ups of this pretty suburb have anything to do with it." In January 2020, the Herald Sun's Fiona Byrne praised the serial's younger cast and believed Junkeer would be "one to watch" in 2020.

As part of his feature criticising police storylines in Neighbours, Joe Julians of the Radio Times bemoaned Yashvi's quick promotion to the force and the inevitable conflict of interest she faced when arresting Harlow. Yashvi was also one of two police officers in the main cast at the time, prompting Julians to write "We've watched this happen time and time again and we have not seen much yet to justify the need for not only one, but two, regular constables."

A writer for 10Play lamented the break up of Ned and Yashvi, writing "Well, damn. Another day, another breakup in Erinsborough. And while this isn't Ned and Yashvi's first split, it may be the last. Although their relationship was plagued with lies, secrets and infidelity, we really wanted to see them flourish. We wanted them to move in together. We wanted a wedding. The next Scott and Charlene. Dee and Toadie! Without the cliff death, of course." The writer observed that since her introduction, "Yashvi had grown into a mature adult who knew she deserved better." They also expressed their excitement in seeing what would happen with the character in the future.
