= Planet Lulin =

Australian children's sci-fi comedy television series

- Genre: Sci-fi comedy
- Created by: Melanie Sano
- Written by: Melanie Sano; Jessica Paine; Michael Drake; Megan Palinkas; Vidya Rajan
- Directed by: Craig Irvin; Sarah Hickey; Nina Buxton
- Starring: Nina Gallas; Uma Dumais; Max Turner; Lisa McCune; Kevin Hofbauer
- Composer: Amelia Barden
- Country of origin: Australia
- Original language: English
- No. of seasons: 1
- No. of episodes: 10

Production
- Executive producers: Gill Carr; Emma Fitzsimons; Mary-Ellen Mullane
- Producers: Pennie Brown; Antje Kulpe
- Production location: Melbourne
- Editors: Geoff Hitchins; Dani Raulli
- Running time: 24 minutes
- Production companies: Moody Street Kids; Princess Pictures; Australian Broadcasting Corporation

Original release
- Network: ABC Me
- Release: 1 January – 12 January 2024

Planet Lulin is a ten-part Australian sci-fi comedy television series aimed at children and created by Melanie Sano, which premiered on ABC Me on 1 January 2024.

== Plot ==
The series centres on Lulin, a 12-year-old girl who is half-alien from the planet Astorad and half-human, who has emerging alien powers. Her energy waves are being tracked by intergalactic girl invaders known as Megaheads who are capturing Astoradians and banishing them to the Void. Lulin wants to win the school science competition, SCI-BOG, with her friends Henri and Spider, while keeping her new alien powers dealt with. Her strange behaviour is noticed by rival Sci-Bogger Verjonica.

== Cast ==
- Nina Gallas as Lulin O'Hara
- Uma Dumais as Henri
- Max Turner as Spider
- Lisa McCune as Ezme
- Kevin Hofbauer as Ken
- Cassie Robb as Bestro, Primo and Suprimo
- Carlee Clements as Verjonica
- Sasha Mandler as Maddison
- George Rayias as Addison
- Jonathan Tsembas as Javin
- Zachary Ruane as Mr Shantell
- Carrisa Lee as Principal Cruz
- Don Bridges as Mr McFoggerty

== Production ==
The series was previously titled F.A.N.G and Galaxy Girl, with major investment from Screen Australia and support from VicScreen.

Pennie Brown and Antje Kulpe are the series producers, with Princess Pictures' Emma Fitzsimons, the ABC's Mary-Ellen Mullane and Moody Street Kids' Gill Carr executive producing. Melanie Sano created and wrote the series.

Filming began in the north-west of Melbourne, Victoria in June 2023.

== Release ==
Planet Lulin premiered on ABC Me on 1 January 2024, with one episode each weekday at 5 pm. All 10 episodes were available on ABC iview from that date.
