= Cece Peters =

Australian actress

- Born: Australia
- Occupation: Actress
- Years active: 2009–present

Cecelia Peters, (Note: also credited as Cecilia Peters.) known professionally as Cece Peters, is an Australian television and theatre actress. Her career began with playing Tiger Johnson on the Nine Network children's series Snake Tales. She later joined the cast of the Network Ten drama series Playing for Keeps, playing Paige Dunkeley for two seasons. Peters continued her theatre career following the role. In 2024, Peters appeared in the soap opera, Neighbours playing the guest role of Liv Bellen.

== Career ==
Peters secured a role on the Nine Network series Snake Tales, playing Tiger Johnson. The show follows a group of children whose parents run a snake sanctuary. She was then known professionally as Cecelia Peters. She then appeared in an episode of City Homicide as Jade Worthington. In 2013, Peters graduated from the Western Australian Academy of Performing Arts. Her affiliation with the WAAPA gave Peters the opportunity to be involved in various professional theatre productions, including Hamlet.

In 2015, Peters had a role in the mini-series Catching Milat. In 2016, the actress secured the role of junior television producer Alice Felton-Smith in the Network Ten drama The Wrong Girl. In 2018, she appeared as Julie in the Nine Network's True Story with Hamish & Andy. In May that year it was announced that Peters had secured the regular role of Paige Dunkeley in the Network Ten drama series Playing for Keeps. The show is about a group of AFL players and their wives' personal lives. She assumes the role of a "down-to-earth high school teacher". She reprised the role during the show's second series.

From February to March 2019, Peters took on the role of "7" in the Belvoir St Theatre production of The Wolves. She returned to Belvoir from February to March 2020, to play Elsa in their production of Shepherd. In 2021, she played Gwen in the stage production of Fourthcoming, at Queensland's QPAC. In 2023, Peters appeared as Kazzy Pearce in Paramount+'s film, The Appleton Ladies' Potato Race. In 2024, Peters appeared as Liv Bellen in the soap opera, Neighbours.

== Filmography ==
Year	Title	Role	Notes
2009	Snake Tales	Tiger Johnson	Regular role
2010	City Homicide	Jade Worthington	Guest role
2013	Profile	Alison	Short film
2015	Catching Milat	Joanne Walters	Guest role
2016–2017	The Wrong Girl	Alice Felton-Smith	Regular role
2018	True Story with Hamish & Andy	Julie	Guest role
2018–2019	Playing for Keeps	Paige Dunkeley	Regular role
2023	The Appleton Ladies' Potato Race	Kazzy Pearce	Feature film
2024	Neighbours	Liv Bellen	Guest role
