= Annie Maynard =

Australian actress

- Born: Adelaide, South Australia, Australia
- Occupation: Actress
- Years active: 2004–present
- Television: Upper Middle Bogan; Dead Lucky; Playing for Keeps; Colin from Accounts
- Children: 1

Annie Maynard is an Australian actress. She is best known for her starring role in the ABC comedy series Upper Middle Bogan as Bess Denyar.

Upper Middle Bogan began screening on ABC on 15 August 2013 with Maynard reprising her role across all three seasons. Maynard subsequently filmed the Australian drama television series Playing for Keeps.

== Early life ==
Born in Adelaide, Maynard did two years at Flinders University Drama Centre.

In 2002, Maynard was accepted to the National Institute of Dramatic Art (NIDA) and graduated in 2004.

== Career ==
Maynard has amassed a number of credits across various Australian television series including Love Child, A Moody Christmas, Rake 3, Puberty Blues, Paper Giants: The Birth of Cleo, Spirited 2, Tricky Business, Dead Lucky, Upper Middle Bogan and All Saints.

In 2024, Maynard appeared in the comedy series Colin from Accounts.

On 17 September 2024, Maynard was named as part of the cast for Paramount+ series Playing Gracie Darling, and on 15 January 2025 the series had entered production.

On 12 November 2025, Maynard was announced as part of the cast for Stan series Dear Life.

Maynard is the pre‑recorded inflight announcement voice used on Virgin Australia aircraft, including safety and cabin messages.

== Personal life ==
Maynard has one child, a son, born in 2014.

== Filmography ==
=== Television ===
Year	Title	Roles	Notes	Ref
2005	All Saints	Misty Browne	Episode: "A Lonely Road"	
2011	Paper Giants: The Birth of Cleo	Annie Woodham	2 episodes	
2011	Spirited	Jennifer	5 episodes	
2012	Tricky Business	Simone Woodward	2 episodes	
2012–14	Puberty Blues	Annie	7 episodes	
2012	A Moody Christmas	Irene	2 episodes	
2013–16	Upper Middle Bogan	Bess Denyar	24 episodes	
2014	Rake	Female Prosecutor	1 episode	
2017	Love Child	Liza	1 episode	
2018–19	Playing for Keeps	Maddy Cochrane	16 episodes	
2018	Dead Lucky	Penny Weir	4 episodes	
2019	Show Me the Movie!	Herself (panel guest)	28 February episode	
2019	Celebrity Name Game	Herself (contestant)	3 episodes	
2020	Black Comedy	Guest Cast	3 episodes	
2020	Love in Lockdown	Clara	2 episodes	
2020	Drunk History Australia	Sergeant S McMurray	Episode: "The Dismissal of Gough Whitlam/Emu Wars"	
2021	Amazing Grace	Bree	1 episode	
2021	Preppers	Gwynn	Episode: "Skeletons"	
2022	Grey Nomads	Emily Rouche	6 episodes	
2022	Would I Lie to You?	Herself (contestant)	18 April episode	
2022	Summer Love	Alex	Episode: "Hannah & Alex"	
2022–26	Colin From Accounts	Yvette	6 episodes	
2023	Wellmania	Nicole Sarkis	Episode: "Life and Death"	
2023	Utopia	Voice	3 episodes	
2024	Heartbreak High	Judith	Episode: "The Feelings Pit"	
2025	Good Cop/Bad Cop	Mrs. Branch	Episode: "Mr. Popular"	
2025	Strife	Bronwyn	Episode: "Sometimes Always"	
2025	Have You Been Paying Attention?	Herself (panel guest)	4 August episode	
2025	Playing Gracie Darling	Anita	5 episodes	
2025	Return to Paradise	Lena Shaw	Episode: "Chapter One: Murder"	
2025	NCIS: Sydney	Janelle	Episode: "Van Life"	
2025	Sunny Nights	Gloria	Episode: "A Journey Down the Uncertain Road of Yes"	
2026	Dear Life	Kelly Schneider	5 episodes	
2026	Caper Crew	Katie Katinkatonk	9 episodes	

=== Film ===
Year	Title	Role	Notes
2008	The Shoe Whisperer	Perfect Girl	Short film
2015	Super Awesome!	Deb Fox	
2018	Disco Dykes	Sal	Short film
2026	Proof of Love	Shirley	Short film
