= Isabella Giovinazzo =

Actress

- Born: Melbourne, Australia
- Occupation: Actress
- Years active: 2000–present
- Notable work: Home and Away; Playing for Keeps
- Spouse: Charlie Ford (m. 2015; sep. 2016)
- Website: https://isabellagiovinazzo.com

Isabella Giovinazzo is an Australian actress. From 2013 until 2017, she played Phoebe Nicholson in the Australian soap opera Home and Away. After leaving the series, she played Jessie Davies in the Network Ten drama series Playing for Keeps from 2018 until 2019. Giovinazzo has had supporting roles in web series Sex and Death, the 2021 miniseries Lie With Me, and soap opera Neighbours as Felicity Higgins.

== Early life ==
Giovinazzo was born in Melbourne. Her father is a music composer and educator of Italian descent. She has two younger sisters - Olivia and Greta.

Giovinazzo completed her secondary education at Melbourne Girls' College. After graduating, she enrolled in a Bachelor of Arts degree at the University of Melbourne. However, during her first semester at university, she deferred her studies, choosing, instead, to travel Europe, spending an extended period in the Calabrian town where her paternal grandparents were born and grew up.

After her return to Melbourne, Giovinazzo, decided to resume her studies and focus more explicitly on the film industry and, in particular, writing and directing. She enrolled in a Bachelor of Film and Television degree at Swinburne University of Technology. While at film school, she was often called upon to act in films under the direction of fellow students. As this progressed, she developed an interest in the craft of acting. After the completion of her degree, she decided to focus on developing her acting skills, and took night classes at a number of private acting schools in Melbourne, Howard Fine and 16th Street, among others.

== Career ==
As a film student, she directed a number of short films. She co-wrote the documentary Chong's World with Ella Carey, and it was selected for inclusion in the St Kilda Film Festival. After the completion of her degree, when her attention turned more to acting, she wrote, produced, and played the lead role in the short film Swim that was also selected for inclusion in the St. Kilda Film Festival. It later screened at the Byron Bay Film Festival, and aired on the Australian television network SBS.

In November 2013, it was announced that Giovinazzo had joined the cast of soap opera Home and Away as Phoebe Nicholson, marking her first major acting job. She relocated to Sydney for the role and began filming mid-2013, before making her first appearance in the November 2013 season finale. Her character is a singer/songwriter who leaves Melbourne when she learns her former boyfriend is putting on a music festival in the fictional town of Summer Bay. Giovinazzo decided to leave Home and Away to pursue new roles, and she made her final appearance in Home and Away on 11 May 2017.

Following her departure from Home and Away, Giovinazzo was cast in the Network Ten drama Playing for Keeps. She played Jessie, a footballer's wife, who gave up her career in the sport to be a mother. Playing for Keeps was cancelled after two seasons. Giovinazzo played a supporting role in the 2020 web series Sex and Death, alongside writer and director Kathleen Lee. The series later aired on SBS Viceland.

In 2021, Giovinazzo appeared in drama miniseries Lie With Me as Caroline Wilder. She also joined the cast of Neighbours in the recurring role of Felicity Higgins. The following year, she appeared in the web series Discontent, which follows five millennials who are linked through their phones and social media. Giovinazzo plays Apple.

== Personal life ==
Giovinazzo married her partner Charlie Ford in 2015. The couple separated in August 2016. Giovinazzo was in a relationship with her Home and Away co-star James Stewart from 2016 to 2017.

In January 2025, Giovinazzo confirmed on her social media that she was expecting her first child with her partner.

== Filmography ==
Year	Title	Role	Notes
2001	Wee Jimmy	Marcella	Television film
2002	Out of Darkness	Alice	Short film
2012	One of Many Night Stands	Lotty	Short film
2012	Him Behind Her	Marianne	Short film
2012	Swim	She	Short film; also writer and producer
2013–2017	Home and Away	Phoebe Nicholson	Series regular
2018–2019	Playing for Keeps	Jessie Davies	
2020	Sex and Death	Tanya	Web series
2021	Lie With Me	Caroline Wilder	
2021	Neighbours	Felicity Higgins	Recurring role
2022	Discontent	Apple	Episodes: "Apple", "Maya"
