= Snake Tales (TV series) =

Australian children's television series

- Titlecard
- Starring: Peter Rowsthorn
- Country of origin: Australia
- No. of seasons: 1
- No. of episodes: 13

Production
- Running time: 24 minutes (approx.)
- Production companies: Westside Film & Television

Original release
- Network: Nine Network
- Release: 5 September – 28 November 2009

Snake Tales is a 2009 Australian children's television series, comprising 13 episodes. It premiered on the Nine Network on 5 September 2009.

== Overview ==
The series revolves around a Snake Park located in the fictional suburb of Barren-Barren, the park is home to several residents, one of which is Tiger, daughter of the snake park owner Jake. Tiger is a twelve-year-old girl, who is matured well beyond her years and desires to move to the city. Her father is a not-so bright teacher, who runs the park and home school, known as the International Outback school. Tiger is joined by her brother J.J, siblings Skye and Harrison and their mother Miranda with international student Digby. Together they face the problems of living together and turning the snake park into a success.

== Cast ==
=== Main / regular ===
- Peter Rowsthorn as Jake Johnson
- Cecilia Peters as Tiger Rose Johnson
- Danielle Horvat as Skye Sailendra
- Nicholas Fleming as Harrison Sailendra
- Leah Vandenberg as Miranda Sailendra
- Lucas Tang as Digby
- Liam Maguire as J.J. Johnson
- Ben Schumann as Goober

=== Notable guests ===
- Mark Mitchell
- Marg Downey
- Francis Greenslade
- David Tredinnick
- Jane Allsop
- Todd MacDonald
- Daniela Farinacci.

== Episodes ==
No.	Title	Directed by	Written by	Original release date
1	"Catch The Snake"	Daniel Nettheim	Alix Beane	5 September 2009
Miranda enrolls her two children, Skye and Harrison into the International Outback School after she becomes the parks vet and a pleasant experience from their holiday in Barren-Barren, Skyes is angry at the idea after having to leave her life in England behind, however Harrison takes a lighter view of the situation as he has made friends with the three other live-in students: J.J, Digby and Tiger. Tiger is the daughter of park owner Jake who encounters a problem after a snake is on the loose.
2	"Disco And Discovery"	Daniel Nettheim	Alix Beane	12 September 2009
After a flood separates Barren-Barren from supplies. This causes Harrison and Digby to go outside and hunt for food. After a supply helicopter arrives they only find cosmetic products, because Skye swapped the food order.
3	"The Scholarship"	Ralph Strasser	Sam Carroll	19 September 2009
Skye and Tiger both sit a test for a scholarship to an inner-city school, however Skye swaps her test with Tigers which causes Skye to win the scholarship. Meanwhile, Harrison deals his feelings for Tiger.
4	"Lights, Camera, Action"	Ralph Strasser	Sam Carroll	26 September 2009
A television producer arrives at the snake park, hoping to turn the over-dramatic lives of the residents into a successful reality series for the television network.
5	"The Rock Star & The Smuggler"	Daniel Nettheim	Brendan Luno	3 October 2009
Jake decides to set up a bed and breakfast at the snake park; however one visitor is a criminal posing a rock star and two elderly stayers make Jake an offer to buy out the Bed'n'Breakfast.
6	"Girls Will Be Girls"	Daniel Nettheim	Brendan Luno	10 October 2009
Skye panics at the discovery of a friend from her hometown of London, England, which is a problem because her friend assumes the snake park is really a resort.
7	"Day of the Parents"	Nicholas Verso	Mark Shirrefs	17 October 2009
Digby's mother and father visit the Snake Park to see Digby's speech, expecting the snake park to be a world class school and the 'Melbourne Tigers' basketball team arrive at the park for a holiday, which Tiger hopes will increase profits after living on sardines for the past week.
8	"Snake Oil Merchant"	Ralph Strasser	Doug McLeod	24 October 2009
Skye's and Harrison's wealthy oil tycoon father arrives at the snake park, his reason for visiting is to purchase the snake park, however only because of hidden oil underneath it, however Tiger sees through his lies, however if her dad accepts the offer, they can move to the city.
9	"The Snake Hunter"	Nicholas Verso	Doug McLeod	31 October 2009
An American teen actor arrives at the snake park for training on his new feature film entitled The Snake Hunter.
10	"The Big Wet"	Ralph Strasser	Kris Mrksa	7 November 2009
The annual heavy rainfall season has arrived, which causes everyone to act strange until it is over.
11	"Taming The Tiger"	Daniel Nettheim	Kris Mrksa	14 November 2009
Tiger goes on her very first date, however she later discovers it was an elaborate scheme set up by Skye so she could travel to the Barren-Barren carnival.
12	"So Sue Me"	Nicholas Verso	Anthony Watt	21 November 2009
Skye and Tiger battle to win the school captain election after the students believe Tiger is spending the school budget on educational things, whilst all Skye wants to spend the school budget on is ice-cream and Excursions
13	"Operation Break Up"	Daniel Nettheim	Anthony Watt	28 November 2009
Skye and Tiger work together to stop the relationship between Jake and Miranda going ahead. After creating a negative relationship between the two, Jake decides to sell the snake park and move to the city. Tiger is finally happy until she discovers Skye is in her class, she also sees Harrison being bullied and her father depressed.

== Production ==
The series was filmed in Victoria, and produced by Westside Film & Television.

== Release ==
It was distributed by Southern Star. and premiered on the Nine Network on 5 September 2009.
