= List of Upper Middle Bogan episodes =

The following is an episode list of the Australian comedy program Upper Middle Bogan, there are currently 24 episodes.

== Series overview ==
Series	Episodes	Originally released		DVD release (Region 4)
Series	Episodes	First released	Last released	DVD release (Region 4)
1	8	15 August 2013	3 October 2013	18 September 2013
2	8	16 October 2014	4 December 2014	26 November 2014
3	8	12 October 2016	30 November 2016	16 November 2016

== Episodes ==
=== Series 1 (2013) ===
No. overall	No. in season	Title	Directed by	Written by	Original release date	Australian viewers (millions)
1	1	"I'm a Swan"	Wayne Hope	Robyn Butler and Wayne Hope	15 August 2013	0.927
Middle-class woman, Bess Denyar, discovers she's adopted. She's shocked to find her birth parents head up a drag racing team in the outer suburbs.
2	2	"Forefathers and Two Mothers"	Wayne Hope	Robyn Butler and Wayne Hope	22 August 2013	0.861
Bess is angry at Margaret for lying to her all these years and decides to concentrate on getting to know her biological parents. However, becoming one big family could take longer than hoped.
3	3	"Your Roots Are Showing"	Wayne Hope	Robyn Butler and Wayne Hope	29 August 2013	0.823
Wayne and Julie give Bess a ride in a V8 Supercar to make up for all the birthdays they've missed. Bess is trying hard to please everyone, but is no longer sure where she belongs.
4	4	"Picture Perfect"	Tony Martin	Robyn Butler and Wayne Hope (story); Tony Martin (teleplay)	5 September 2013	0.881
Bess arranges a lunch for her two mothers, which doesn't go quite as planned. Julie feels terrible for giving Bess up for adoption and presents her with a rather unusual gift.
5	5	"No Angel"	Wayne Hope	Robyn Butler and Wayne Hope (story); Gary McCaffrie (teleplay)	12 September 2013	0.687
Danny is devastated when Edwina wants to quit the bassoon after relentless bullying at school. She makes everything all right at a music concert where she plays in a way no one expects.
6	6	"Behind You!"	Tony Martin	Robyn Butler and Wayne Hope (story); Gary McCaffrie and Robyn Butler (teleplay)	19 September 2013	0.698
After backing into another car, Wayne is forced to take a driving test. At work, Bess has a bullying issue and Wayne offers to come to her rescue – unaware she may also come to his.
7	7	"Don't Over Think It"	Tony Martin	Robyn Butler and Wayne Hope (story); Tony Martin (teleplay)	26 September 2013	0.673
Angry with Margaret for not taking her diabetes seriously, Bess sets up training sessions with newly qualified Brianna. Margaret reluctantly agrees, but is surprised at the outcome.
8	8	"Nationals"	Wayne Hope	Robyn Butler and Wayne Hope	3 October 2013	0.602
Bess and her family support Team Wheeler at the drag racing championships. Bess tries to solve engine problems, however the aftermath is filled with fury.

=== Series 2 (2014) ===
No. overall	No. in season	Title	Directed by	Written by	Original release date	Australian viewers (millions)
9	1	"Hot But Cold"	Wayne Hope	Robyn Butler	16 October 2014	0.719
Bess develops some trust and abandonment issues as she continues to struggle with the adoption discovery and thinks Danny is either lying to her or going to leave her. However, Danny is just busy working on his new passive cooling system to avoid using the air conditioner.
10	2	"Let's Talk About Sex"	Wayne Hope	Trent Roberts	23 October 2014	0.645
After the Brights attend sex education night at school, Oscar is keen to learn all about sex. Bess and Danny argue about their own sex life, which Danny feels has been interrupted ever since they met the Wheelers. Wayne and Julie offer Bess and Danny some sex advice and encourage them to undertake the Seven Days of Sex Challenge.
11	3	"Bonds and Stocks"	Tony Martin	Robyn Butler and Kirsty Fisher	30 October 2014	0.530
Bess tries to find some family bonding hobbies for her own family because she's worried that they don't have any like the Wheelers do. Meanwhile, Julie discovers on familypedigree.com that Wayne is a descendant of rich relatives and the Wheelers set out to find them.
12	4	"I Dream of Broccolini"	Wayne Hope	Alix Beane, Robyn Butler and Wayne Hope	6 November 2014	0.589
Shawn offers to compete against Team Wheeler's arch rivals the Amentas at the junior drag racing. Bess is delighted to involve her family into helping Team Wheeler until Edwina develops a crush on the junior Amenta boy BJ.
13	5	"Occupation Hazards"	Wayne Hope	Robyn Butler	13 November 2014	0.604
After Amber applies for a big promotion at the bank and misses out because of a snooty interviewer on the panel, Julie discovers that Margaret knows the snooty interviewer and gets her to put in a good word for Amber. Meanwhile, Bess is getting sick of the frequent medical-related visits from the Wheelers.
14	6	"Twothirties"	Tony Martin	Robyn Butler	20 November 2014	0.585
Wayne buys Julie an expensive diamond necklace for their 30th wedding anniversary, but when he suddenly gets a toothache, Wayne cannot afford the dentist. He tries to hide his toothache by avoiding Julie, who becomes increasingly suspicious. Meanwhile, Bess is worried about buying Wayne and Julie's present as she wants to get them the right thing.
15	7	"All You Can Eat"	Tony Martin	Tony Martin	27 November 2014	0.596
When Danny lets Shawn do work experience with him, Danny feels embarrassed by his middle class lifestyle due to the constant interruptions of the cleaners, gardeners and wine deliveries. Meanwhile, after Margaret's doctor advises her to find a dog to walk every day, Julie and Bess give her an abandoned greyhound which is later kidnapped.
16	8	"Jules in the Crown"	Wayne Hope	Trent Roberts	4 December 2014	0.590
After a sports presenter on TV talks about Julie being too old to race, she decides to quit and sells the Wheelers' dragster to help them get out of debt. Julie goes to stay with Bess after the Wheelers are furious with her for selling the dragster. Margaret and the Wheelers team up to help get Julie out of the Brights' home and back into her own home.

=== Series 3 (2016) ===
No. overall	No. in season	Title	Directed by	Written by	Original release date	Australian viewers (millions)
17	1	"New Kids on the Block"	Wayne Hope	Robyn Butler and Wayne Hope	12 October 2016	0.574
The Bright family move into an ultra modern house that has been designed by Danny, but Danny refuses to let Bess clutter it with their old furniture. Meanwhile, Brianna wants to be a contestant on The Block with her new love and fiancé, Younis.
18	2	"Knock It Off"	Wayne Hope	Robyn Butler and Wayne Hope	19 October 2016	0.505
Kayne is asked by a homewares store shopowner to paint his designs on her store after seeing his work on the Wheeler truck, but Margaret discovers she has no plans to pay him. Bess receives a fake Fendi bag from Julie and Danny's local coffee supplier has copied his favourite designer shirt to make uniforms, for only a fraction of the price.
19	3	"If You Knew Susie"	Wayne Hope	Robyn Butler and Wayne Hope	26 October 2016	0.478
Bess is shocked when she discover that Julie has a sister, even though Julie told everyone that her sister was dead. Julie tells all the family to not contact her but Bess, with the help of Brianna, Amber and Margaret, investigate. Danny takes Oscar away to an architects' conference where his special role as guest speaker is compromised and, when a council officer shuts down Kayne's backyard protein powder shop, Wayne is determined to fight.
20	4	"Sons of Anarchy"	Wayne Hope	Robyn Butler and Wayne Hope	2 November 2016	0.482
Amber is shocked at Shawn after he arrives home with his new and highly alternative girlfriend, Ashley, in tow. Amber struggles to find space, not just with Shawn, but with the rest of the family. Brianna is busy with Younis, and Wayne and Julie are binge-watching TV in their newly installed private cinema. Meanwhile, Bess is distressed when Edwina announces she wants to study medicine after meeting an inspirational female surgeon, having never been inspired before by Bess' own medical career.
21	5	"Sticking to Your Principals"	Wayne Hope	Robyn Butler and Wayne Hope	9 November 2016	0.484
Shawn wants to drop out of school, so Amber turns to the school Principal who helps in an unexpected manner. Julie is injured so Kayne offers to drive for Team Wheeler, while Bess and Danny prepare Oscar for a wilderness expedition.
22	6	"Generous to a Faultline"	Wayne Hope	Robyn Butler and Wayne Hope	16 November 2016	0.550
Bess brings Margaret and Julie to a Mothers' Day Lunch, where Bess having 'two mothers' is misunderstood. The Wheelers help Amber and Evan at a hardware store sausage sizzle and Danny signs the kids up for a charity bike ride.
23	7	"Row Row Row"	Wayne Hope	Robyn Butler and Wayne Hope	23 November 2016	0.545
When Edwina's rowing scull is underprepared for the interschool regatta, she asks Brianna to be coach instead, who accepts the challenge with much more enthusiasm than Edwina expected. To cheer them on, the Wheelers join Bess up at the Murray River replete with jet skis and giant tyres. Evan takes the opportunity to give Amber his Dad's vintage speed boat, but he is taken back when she seems unhappy with his gift. After minor surgery, Danny has to stay home to recover while Margaret looks after him.
24	8	"Christmas Break"	Wayne Hope	Robyn Butler and Wayne Hope	30 November 2016	0.568
Bess is exhausted by Margaret and Julie fighting over her, so decides to spend Christmas in New York with Danny and the kids. Telling Margaret is challenging but it's telling Julie that proves impossible. Julie is already heartbroken that she faces her first Christmas without Amber and Brianna who are both travelling interstate to visit their partners' families. While Bess summons the nerve to tell Julie the truth, Danny helps Oscar choose an appropriate Kris Kringle gift for his crush. Wayne and Kayne promise to make their Christmas lights display this year, the best in the street.

== Ratings ==
=== Series 1 (2013) ===
No. in series	No. in season	Episode	Original airdate	Overnight Viewers	Nightly Rank	Consolidated Viewers	Adjusted Rank
1	1	"I'm a Swan"	15 August 2013	0.927	6	1.071	3
2	2	"Forefathers and Two Mothers"	22 August 2013	0.861	9	0.995	3
3	3	"Your Roots Are Showing"	29 August 2013	0.823	9	0.955	5
4	4	"Picture Perfect"	5 September 2013	0.881	9	0.959	8
5	5	"No Angel"	12 September 2013	0.687	12	0.812	10
6	6	"Behind You!"	19 September 2013	0.698	11	0.792	10
7	7	"Don't Over Think It"	26 September 2013	0.673	11	0.806	9
8	8	"Nationals"	3 October 2013	0.602	13	0.760	8

=== Series 2 (2014) ===
No. in series	No. in season	Episode	Original airdate	Overnight Viewers	Nightly Rank	Consolidated Viewers	Adjusted Rank
9	1	"Hot But Cold"	16 October 2014	0.719	8	0.837	6
10	2	"Let's Talk About Sex"	23 October 2014	0.645	11	0.769	7
11	3	"Bonds and Stocks"	30 October 2014	0.530	15	0.672	11
12	4	"I Dream of Broccolini"	6 November 2014	0.589	12	0.705	10
13	5	"Occupation Hazards"	13 November 2014	0.604	12	0.712	10
14	6	"Twothirties"	20 November 2014	0.585	12	0.687	11
15	7	"All You Can Eat"	27 November 2014	0.596	11	0.723	8
16	8	"Jules in the Crown"	4 December 2014	0.590	10	0.687	8

=== Series 3 (2016) ===
No. in series	No. in season	Episode	Original airdate	Overnight Viewers	Nightly Rank	Consolidated Viewers	Adjusted Rank
17	1	"New Kids on the Block"	12 October 2016	0.574	15	0.704	13
18	2	"Knock It Off"	19 October 2016	0.505	19	0.636	16
19	3	"If You Knew Susie"	26 October 2016	0.478	20	0.618	14
20	4	"Sons of Anarchy"	2 November 2016	0.482	18	0.618	15
21	5	"Sticking to Your Principals"	9 November 2016	0.484	19	0.646	11
22	6	"Generous to a Faultline"	16 November 2016	0.551	13	0.706	9
23	7	"Row Row Row"	23 November 2016	0.545	15	0.696	8
24	8	"Christmas Break"	30 November 2016	0.568	12	0.716	8
