= Playing for Keeps (TV series) =

Australian drama television series

- Genre: Drama
- Created by: Rick Maier
- Developed by: Claire Phillips; Christine Bartlett; Jaime Browne
- Written by: Claire Phillips; Christine Bartlett; Ian Meadows; Ainslie Clouston; Mithila Gupta; Nicky Arnall
- Directed by: Sian Davies; Scott Major; Tori Garrett; Ian Watson
- Starring: Madeleine West; Annie Maynard; Cece Peters; Olympia Valance; Isabella Giovinazzo; Jeremy Lindsay Taylor
- Country of origin: Australia
- Original language: English
- No. of seasons: 2
- No. of episodes: 16

Production
- Executive producer: Rory Callaghan
- Producers: Paul Moloney; Kerrie Mainwaring
- Production locations: Melbourne, Victoria
- Cinematography: Martin Smith
- Running time: 60 minutes
- Production company: Screentime

Original release
- Network: Network 10
- Release: 19 September 2018 – 4 December 2019

Related
- The Goss Boss; Sidelines

Playing for Keeps is an Australian drama television series, which began airing on Network 10 on 19 September 2018. The series was created from a concept by the network's head of drama Rick Maier. It centres on the wives and girlfriends of the players at the fictional Southern Jets Football Club. Its ensemble cast includes Madeleine West, Annie Maynard, Cece Peters, Olympia Valance, Isabella Giovinazzo, and Jeremy Lindsay Taylor. Playing for Keeps was renewed for a second season, which premiered on 16 October 2019.

== Production ==
On 9 November 2017, the series was announced during Ten's upfronts. It focuses on the women behind the men of an Australian rules football club. The concept for the series was created by Rick Maier, the head of drama at the network. Playing for Keeps is produced by Screentime, and has received investment from Screen Australia and Film Victoria. The episodes have been written by Claire Phillips, Christine Bartlett, Ian Meadows, Ainslie Clouston, and Mithila Gupta, with Sian Davies, Scott Major, and Tori Garrett directing.

In May 2018, it was announced Madeleine West, Cece Peters, Annie Maynard, and Olympia Valance, had been cast as the wives and girlfriends. West plays Kath Rickards, who is married to the coach and acts as a "mentor and den mother." Peters plays Paige Dunkeley, a high school teacher who follows her boyfriend to the city. Maynard was cast as Maddy Cochrane, a lawyer and a mother of two. Valance is socialite Tahlia Woods, who is engaged to the captain of the Southern Jets. Of securing her role, Valance stated "When I read the script, I just knew that I had to play Tahlia. I was determined this character would be mine." The following month, Isabella Giovinazzo was cast as Jessie Davies, a former footballer married to one of the club's players.

Jeremy Lindsay Taylor, Jackson Gallagher, Kevin Hofbauer, George Pullar, James Mason, and Ethan Panizza also joined the ensemble cast. Taylor is the team's coach Brian Rickards, Gallagher plays Tahlia's fiancé Connor Marrello, Hofbauer is an "admired club veteran" Travis Cochrane, while Pullar, Mason and Panizza portray footballers Daniel Fletcher, Jack Davies, and Rusty O'Reilly respectively. Paul Ireland was cast as Andrew Macleish, the president of the Southern Jets. Of the casting process, Maier stated "This has been one of the most comprehensive casting calls we've done. The key roles dictate strong, independent, fascinating women. We think Nathan Lloyd and the team at Screentime have done a brilliant job securing a cast of this calibre."

Filming for the show began on 4 June 2018 in Melbourne. The eight-part series began airing on 19 September 2018 on Network Ten and WIN Television. The first episode was available to view one week early on the catch-up service 10Play.

On 14 November 2018, Network 10 announced the show had been renewed for a second season. It began airing on 16 October 2019. The first two episodes are directed by Major. Season 2 is set six months after the season 1 finale, and sees the club welcome a new player Liam Flynn (Ben Chapple) and his girlfriend Kendall Pereira (Jess Bush).

The series was officially cancelled in February 2021 after failing to be picked up for a third season.

== Cast ==
- Madeleine West as Kath Rickards
- Annie Maynard as Maddy Cochrane
- Cece Peters as Paige Dunkeley
- Olympia Valance as Tahlia Woods
- Isabella Giovinazzo as Jessie Davies
- Jeremy Lindsay Taylor as Brian Rickards
- George Pullar as Daniel Fletcher
- Jackson Gallagher as Connor Marrello
- Kevin Hofbauer as Travis Cochrane
- Ethan Panizza as Rusty O'Reilly
- James Mason as Jack Davies
- Ben Chapple as Liam Flynn
- Jess Bush as Kendall Pereira
- Paul Ireland as Andrew Macleish
- Miriama Smith as Dr Lauren Gambi
- Alicia Banit as Karlie Lum
- Georgina Naidu as Toni Chadha
- Nick Russell as Brody Schneider
- Christopher Brown as Neil Murray
- Tom O'Sullivan as Nate Sabo
- Kasia Kaczmarek as Joanna Zielinksi
- Alison Whyte as Diane Marrello
- Alex Williams as Shane Manrara
- Marta Kaczmarek as Ferderikia

== Episodes ==
Series	Episodes	Originally released	
Series	Episodes	First released	Last released
1	8	19 September 2018	7 November 2018
2	8	16 October 2019	4 December 2019

=== Season 1 (2018) ===
No. overall	No. in season	Title	Directed by	Written by	Original release date	Aus. viewers
1	1	Episode 1	Sian Davies	Claire Phillips	19 September 2018 (Note: The pilot episode received an early release on 12 September 2018.)	626,000
Teacher Paige Dunkeley moves to Melbourne to be with her boyfriend Daniel Fletcher, a footballer and the newest member of the Southern Jets Football Club. At a barbecue for the team, Paige meets the wives and girlfriends of the players; Kath, Tahlia, Maddy and Jessie. After a poor start to the pre-season, the team's coach, Brian Rickards announces that the players are returning to training camp the following day. Tahlia and the team's captain Connor Marrello also announce their engagement, while Kath and Brian later go into the city to continue their respective affairs. During a team bonding exercise at the camp, Jessie's husband Jack Davies dies while kayaking.
2	2	Episode 2	Sian Davies	Christine Bartlett	26 September 2018	496,000
Jack's funeral is held. Brian tells Kath that Jack's head injury was unlikely to have occurred from falling out of the kayak. Paige recalls seeing Jessie and Rusty having an intimate talk at the barbecue. Paige starts her first day teaching at the school. Tahlia confronts Connor after learning he is adopted, while Travis tells Maddy that he has signed on to play for another year. The Southern Jets win their first game, thanks to Daniel kicking the winning goal. Daniel later admits to Paige that Jack was alive after falling out of the kayak, but Connor told him to move on, leaving Jack and Rusty alone together.
3	3	Episode 3	Tori Garrett	Ian Meadows	3 October 2018	497,000
Rusty breaks up with his girlfriend Karlie, who gets drunk and tells Paige that Rusty and Jessie were having an affair. Karlie posts about the break up on social media, prompting Kath to ask Paige to speak with her. Paige is later blamed when someone talks to the press about Jessie and Rusty's suspected affair. Maddy learns Jessie is pregnant, while Tahlia clashes with Connor's mother, Diane. Kath ends her affair with her escort, and she later has sex with Connor. Rusty is called to speak at the inquest into Jack's death. He tells the coroner that he and Jack had an argument, before Jack fell out of the kayak. Rusty lies that no one else was there.
4	4	Episode 4	Tori Garrett	Christine Bartlett	10 October 2018	427,000
After Lauren tells Brian that Rusty knows about their relationship, he ends it and decides to close his and Kath's open marriage. But Kath has sex with Connor again. Jessie learns that Karlie told the press about her supposed affair with Rusty, leading to the women coming together to apologise to Paige, who invites them and Lauren for a girls night out. Meanwhile, Rusty and Travis have a fight in the changing room, and Jack's death is ruled an accident. Travis later reveals to Maddy that he gave Jack Xanax, which he took before he died. Jessie meets with her boyfriend Nate, while Rusty contacts journalist Neil Murray to inform him that he is not having an affair with Jessie because he is gay.
5	5	Episode 5	Scott Major	Christine Bartlett and Mithila Gupta	17 October 2018	359,000 (Note: Timeshifted ratings unavailable for Episode 5.)
Tahlia encourages Paige to make some extra money by setting up a social media brand. Paige is later fired for filming one of her students without permission at a bar the previous night, while Connor refuses to take part in the shoot for Tahlia's new men's fragrance. Nate asks Jessie to move to Queensland to be with him. Brian and Connor express their support for Rusty at a press conference, but Andrew makes an insensitive joke and later tells Rusty that he would not be playing if it was up to him. Meanwhile, Paige makes a supportive social media post which goes viral, but it leads to a fight with Daniel. Maddy and Travis lose their nanny Joanna, after she tells them she has fallen in love.
6	6	Episode 6	Scott Major	Ainslie Clouston	24 October 2018	538,000
Paige cannot find work, so her colleague Brody offers to speak to their boss on her behalf. Paige also meets up with one of her social media followers, who she thinks is trolling her, which leads to an argument with Daniel about their careers. Tahlia plans an elaborate engagement party and Connor tells her about his affair with Kath. Tahlia forces him to marry her during the party, and she ends her friendship with Kath. Meanwhile, Maddy and Travis struggle to find time to have sex, and they lose another nanny after he walks in on Travis masturbating. A paparazzo threatens to reveal Jessie's pregnancy to the press. Jessie invites Nate to the engagement party, but he is not ready to make their relationship public, so she goes alone. Rusty admits to Kath that he and Jack were in love.
7	7	Episode 7	Sian Davies	Christine Bartlett, Ian Meadows and Ainslie Clouston	31 October 2018	483,000
Tahlia and Connor attend counselling, but realise their relationship is over. Andrew plans to start a foundation in Jack's name to benefit Jessie and the baby. He also employs Maddy in his divorce, and the women soon learn that he is dating Karlie. Travis passes a fitness test following an injury, but Brian tells him that there is no room for him on the team. Paige goes to a recruitment meeting, and Daniel invites Toni and Brody to the president's lunch. Paige later ends their relationship. Jessie meets with Nate, who is reluctant to let everyone know that he is the baby's father. She later learns she is having a daughter. Tahlia tells Brian about Kath and Connor's affair, while Rusty tells Travis about his relationship with Jack.
8	8	Episode 8	Sian Davies	Claire Phillips	7 November 2018	517,000
Paige stays with Tahlia following the break up. She turns down a job offer from Toni, and tells Daniel that she is going to go back home. Brian confronts Connor about the affair with Kath. While their teenage daughter Ella comes home and reveals she is getting married. Maddy sees Joanna and learns that she actually quit because she felt uncomfortable hearing Maddy and Travis having sex. Tahlia meets with Connor's mother to discuss their separation, and she goes ahead with her fragrance launch. Connor tells Jessie about leaving Jack in the water the day he died. Jessie, Maddy and Kath think Andrew had something to do with Jack's death, as he was against his relationship with Rusty. However, Brian explains that he pushed Jack during a fight, causing him to hit his head on a rock. He then walked away and Jack died. Andrew resigns from the club. Daniel and Paige say goodbye at the train station.

=== Season 2 (2019) ===
No. overall	No. in season	Title	Directed by	Written by	Original release date	Aus. viewers
9	1	"Episode 1"	Scott Major	Claire Phillips	16 October 2019	297,000
Six months later, Brian has stepped down as coach of the Southern Jets and Travis has succeeded him. Kath is now sitting on the board, and tries to persuade Brian to take a new job with the club. Jessie has given birth to a daughter and is living with Rusty. The club signs new player Liam Flynn. Paige returns from her travels for Dan's birthday, but insists that they are not getting back together. Tahlia goes home with a woman that she believes Connor is interested in. Connor later tells her that he has met someone. The women meet Liam's girlfriend Kendall, who takes cocaine and picks a fight with Jessie and Maddy. Kendall later calls Maddy and Travis to her home, where they find Liam with a head injury.
10	2	"Episode 2"	Scott Major	Ainslie Clouston	23 October 2019	221,000
With Liam due to appear at a televised press conference, Kath learns that Kendall glassed him while high on drugs. She urges him to report it, but Liam refuses and tells the press that he was injured during a collision in training. With Maddy's encouragement, Kendall decides to go to rehab. Kath runs for club president and wins, but she and Brian realise that their marriage is not working, and he leaves for a new job. Tahlia announces her new swimwear line. After learning that Paige has been hanging out with Dan, Tahlia tells her to have a one-night stand. Paige meets Brody at a club and they go home together, but nothing happens between them. However, after speaking with Dan about it, Paige kisses Brody. Meanwhile, Jessie sets Rusty up on a date, while he encourages her to return to training.
11	3	"Episode 3"	Ian Watson	Nicky Arnall	30 October 2019	231,000
After breaking up with Kendall, Liam flirts with Tahlia. Kath faces opposition to her ideas for increasing the club's membership and social media presence. Maddy meets with Oliver Jansen, a law school friend and barrister to discuss a case. Wanting to finance her swimwear business, Tahlia visits Connor's mother to get her to sign over the house before she divorces Connor. Diane asks to invest in Tahlia's business instead. Brody and Paige go on a date, but things are awkward when they cannot get away from reminders of the Southern Jets and Dan. They eventually have sex for the first time. Tahlia meets Connor's girlfriend Annabel at the president's lunch. Jessie is invited to train with the Eastern Dragons, but she plans to set up a Southern Jets women's team instead, which gets Kath's approval, but not the rest of the board. The Jets win their opening game
12	4	"Episode 4"	Ian Watson	Emma Gordon	6 November 2019	274,000
Nude photos of Tahlia are uploaded to the internet, after Connor's phone is stolen. Diane advises her to keep silent and release an apology to keep the investors happy. Kath and Brian decide to make their separation public. Paige tells Dan about her relationship with Brody, before he is injured in a collision with a skateboarder. Dan later asks for space from Paige. The Jets suffer their first loss of the season, and the club is visited by a integrity operations manager, after an unusual amount of bets are placed on the opposition. Maddy realises Oliver used her to gain intel into the club. After Jessie gives an interview about her plans for the women's team, the subject of Georgie's paternity is raised by the journalist.
13	5	"Episode 5"	Kate Kendall	Paul Gartside	13 November 2019	301,000
Tahlia's mother Narelle visits, following the death of her second husband Sam, to reconcile their relationship. Tahlia tells Narelle that she was a bad mother and asks her to go home. The women learn that Liam had sex with 17-year old work experience student Samira, and they urge Kath to talk with him. Paige confronts Dan about his friendship with Liam, leading to them having sex. Kath and Brian decide to call their children to tell them about their separation. Maddy is interviewed by integrity about Oliver, and later suffers panic attacks. Connor and Liam fight during training. Jessie organises an open day to promote the Women's team, but she tears her ACL and shatters her dreams of playing professional Women's AFL again.
14	6	"Episode 6"	Kate Kendall	Shaun Topp	20 November 2019	186,000
Liam and Connor continue to fight, resulting in another loss by the Southern Jets. Paige forces herself to tell Brody that she had sex with Dan. Dan is injured when he is involved in a car crash while with Liam, who was under the influence of cocaine. Kath asks Brian to help Travis coach the team.
15	7	"Episode 7"	Scott Major	Ainslie Clouston	27 November 2019	141,000
16	8	"Episode 8"	Scott Major	Emma Gordon	4 December 2019	188,000
At the end of the night Daniel and Paige go outside and Daniel tells Paige that the bikie who visited the party wants him as he has placed some bets with the man. Then, one of the bikies shoots Paige and rides away on his motorbike. The scene ends with everyone trying the help Paige as her life is hanging in the balance.

== Spin-offs ==
In September 2018, Network 10 launched a spin-off web series alongside the first season called The Goss Boss (or TGB) on TenPlay. A new episode became available shortly after Playing for Keeps aired that week. The Goss Boss is a fictional gossip show that covers the feuds and fashions featured in Playing for Keeps, and is hosted by Liv Phyland. General manager of digital at Network 10, Liz Baldwin stated: "In addition to our regular behind-the-scenes cast interviews, we created a fun web series that explores the Playing For Keeps storyline in more detail, giving fans of the show the chance to see what it would be like in the real world for the characters on the show. It's a grandstand exposé into Playing For Keeps' real power players: the WAGs."

On 30 October 2019, Network 10 launched a new web series for season two called Sidelines on 10 Play, which was sponsored by Volvo Cars. Each webisode follows the characters during different activities in a car ride.

== Reception ==
Jessica Multari of TV Week called the series "a new TV obsession". Multari found that "there's more to Ten's new Aussie series than socialites swanning around in stilettos supporting their sports star husbands. Scratch the surface and you'll find secrets, betrayal, deceit and heartache." Praising the character of Paige, Multari said she won the audience over with her country charm and stole all of the scenes she was in.

Bridget McManus of The Sydney Morning Herald also gave the series a positive response, writing "This is the Aussie Rules WAG drama that was begging to be made. With a murder mystery blighting the start of the season and rumours and innuendo flying like the proverbial at the ceiling fan, it's a story that could have been lifted straight from a gossip site."

The Age's Karl Quinn said the show's "most obvious comparison is Footballers' Wives, the hysterically over-the-top soapie about English soccer WAGs. But while it has its share of funny moments, Playing For Keeps is a far more sober – and certainly less snarky – affair."

== Home media ==
The first season of Playing for Keeps was released on DVD via Roadshow Entertainment.

Season	Originally aired		Episodes	DVD		
Season	First aired	Last aired	Episodes	Release date	Discs	Special features
1	19 September 2018	7 November 2018	8	8 May 2019	2	Slipcase packaging
2	16 October 2019	4 December 2019	8			
