= Upper Middle Bogan =

- Genre: Comedy
- Created by: Robyn Butler; Wayne Hope
- Written by: Wayne Hope; Robyn Butler; Tony Martin; Gary McCaffrie; Trent Roberts; Kirsty Fisher; Alix Beane
- Directed by: Wayne Hope; Tony Martin
- Starring: Annie Maynard; Glenn Robbins; Michala Banas; Patrick Brammall
- Opening theme: "Comin' Home Baby" by Mel Tormé
- Country of origin: Australia
- Original language: English
- No. of series: 3
- No. of episodes: 24 (list of episodes)

Production
- Executive producers: Robyn Butler; Wayne Hope; Debbie Lee; Geoff Porz
- Producers: Wayne Hope; Robyn Butler
- Production locations: Melbourne, Australia
- Cinematography: Dan Maxwell
- Editor: Chris Branagan
- Camera setup: single-camera
- Running time: 26–28 minutes
- Production company: Gristmill

Original release
- Network: ABC
- Release: 15 August 2013 – 30 November 2016

Upper Middle Bogan is an Australian television comedy program created by Robyn Butler and Wayne Hope. It began screening on ABC on 15 August 2013. The series is directed by Hope and Tony Martin. The second and third series began airing on 16 October 2014 and 12 October 2016, respectively.

== Synopsis ==
Upper Middle Bogan follows the story of two different families connected by blood. Bess Denyar is a doctor who lives in a nice house in an inner city suburb of Melbourne with her architect husband Danny and 13-year-old twins Oscar and Edwina. Bess is stunned when she finds out from blood test results that she is adopted. This occurs when her overbearing posh mother Margaret is admitted to the hospital for high blood sugar levels.

Bess meets her birth parents, Wayne and Julie Wheeler, and is shocked to learn that she has three siblings (Amber, Kayne and Brianna) and that her biological family, the "bogan" Wheelers, head a drag racing team in the outer suburbs of the city.

== Cast ==
=== Main ===
- Annie Maynard as Bess Denyar
- Robyn Nevin as Margaret Denyar
- Patrick Brammall as Danny Bright
- Glenn Robbins as Wayne Wheeler
- Robyn Malcolm as Julie Wheeler
- Michala Banas as Amber Wheeler
- Maddy Jevic as Brianna Wheeler
- Rhys Mitchell as Kayne Wheeler
- Harrison Feldman as Oscar Bright
- Lara Robinson as Edwina Bright
- Dougie Baldwin as Shawn Van Winkle

=== Recurring ===
- Dave Thornton as Troy Van Winkle (Amber's ex-boyfriend and Shawn's father)
- Sue Jones as Pat (Margaret's best friend)
- Khaled Khalafalla as Younis
- Martin Dingle-Wall as Evan
- Mark Mitchell as Dr Mortimer

=== Guests ===
- Debra Byrne as Susan
- Eddie Baroo as Scary Patient
- Gareth Yuen as Lin
- Jacqueline Brennan as Celia
- Kym Gyngell as Mr Widdecombe
- Louise Crawford as Hostess
- Nicholas Bell as French Man
- Rohan Nichol as Matt
- Roz Hammond as Sandi
- Steve Bastoni as Benji Ament
- Syd Brisbane as Farmer
- Tegan Higginbotham as Jess

== Filming locations ==
The town house featured as Margaret Denyar's house in Upper Middle Bogan is located at Summerhill Road in Brighton East, Victoria. It is used to shoot both interior and exterior scenes for the series. The house was sold for $1,905,000 at an auction held on 24 May 2014.

== Episodes ==
Series	Episodes	Originally released		DVD release (Region 4)
Series	Episodes	First released	Last released	DVD release (Region 4)
1	8	15 August 2013	3 October 2013	18 September 2013
2	8	16 October 2014	4 December 2014	26 November 2014
3	8	12 October 2016	30 November 2016	16 November 2016

== International broadcasts ==
In the United States, the show was retitled Bess of Both Worlds when it began streaming on the subscription video-on-demand service Hulu in 2015. The series has since streamed under its original title on Prime Video in the U.S. In New Zealand, the show airs Thursday nights at 10:00 pm on TV One. Episodes are available weekly to stream through TVNZ's Watch Now service.

As of late 2024, Upper Middle Bogan was being streamed internationally by Netflix, including in the United States and the United Kingdom.

Currently available to view in UK on ITVx.

== Awards and nominations ==
Year	Award	Category	Recipients and nominees	Result
2013	AACTA Awards	Best Television Comedy or Light Entertainment Series	Upper Middle Bogan	Nominated
2013	AACTA Awards	Best Performance in a Television Comedy	Robyn Nevin	Nominated
2013	AACTA Awards	Best Screenplay in Television	Series 1, Episode 5 ("No Angel")	Nominated
2014	Logie Awards	Most Outstanding Light Entertainment Program	Upper Middle Bogan	Nominated
2014	AACTA Awards	Best Costume Design in Television	Sandi Cichello	Nominated
2015	Logie Awards	Most Outstanding Comedy Program	Upper Middle Bogan	Nominated
2016	AACTA Awards	Best Television Comedy	Robyn Butler, Wayne Hope	Won

== See also ==
- List of Australian television series
- List of programs broadcast by ABC (Australian TV network)
- Upper middle class
- Bogan
