= List of Neighbours characters introduced in 2021 =

Neighbours is an Australian television soap opera. It was first broadcast on 18 March 1985 and airs on digital channel 10 Peach. The following is a list of characters that first appear in the show in 2021, by order of first appearance. All characters are introduced by the show's executive producer Jason Herbison. Curtis Perkins was introduced towards the end of January, and Jesse Porter made his debut in March. Sheila Canning began appearing in April. Abigail Tanaka and Evelyn Farlow arrived in August, followed by Britney Barnes in September and Felicity Higgins during October, whilst December also saw the arrival of Wendy Rodwell.

== Curtis Perkins ==
Curtis Perkins
- Neighbours character
- Portrayed by: Nathan Borg
- Duration: 2021–2025
- First appearance: 28 January 2021
- Last appearance: 3 March 2025
- Introduced by: Jason Herbison
In-universe information
- Occupation: Maths and physics teacher
- Aunts: Vera Punt

Curtis Perkins, played by Nathan Borg, made his first appearance on 28 January 2021. The character and Borg's casting details were announced on 3 December 2020, which is the United Nations' International Day of Persons with Disabilities. Borg is the first actor with a cochlear implant to appear on Australian television. Of his casting, he stated "Growing up I never saw anyone like me on television, so I knew it was time to have a hard of hearing actor on our Australian screens. I think it's important in this industry that people with all disabilities of all ages get to tell their stories." Borg began filming his first scenes for the recurring role of Curtis in November. Curtis is a newly qualified teacher who joins the teaching staff at Erinsborough High, "under the watchful eye" of Susan Kennedy (Jackie Woodburne) and Jane Harris (Annie Jones). He is billed as "an easy-going guy" and "far tougher than he lets on". Series producer Jason Herbison said Curtis is independent and not defined by his disability. He also has a link to one of the established characters. Borg was initially contracted for eight weeks, but the producers asked him to continue in the role and he "was happy to bring more of Curtis, for sure." Curtis was later given a love interest in the form of Jesse Porter (Cameron Robbie), who comes to spy on a few residents and enters into a fake relationship with Harlow Robinson (Jemma Donovan). Borg told Joe Julians of Radio Times that Curtis is hurt by Jesse's behaviour and "feels quite betrayed and very angry". Borg also told Julians that the plot allows the audience to see a new side to Curtis, as he gets angry and even physical at one point. Borg admitted that he really enjoyed playing out those scenes and exploring another side to the character.

Principal of Erinsborough High, Susan Kennedy introduces Curtis to fellow teacher Jane Harris and explains that this is his first teaching appointment. She also tells Jane that Curtis is deaf and will be teaching some Auslan classes for the Year 9 Connections program. Jane asks Curtis how he copes if he cannot hear what the students are saying, and he shows her his cochlear implant and mentions that he can lip read. Susan asks Curtis and Jane to keep an eye on student Hendrix Greyson (Benny Turland). Jane and Susan later notice Hendrix sitting alone at lunch and Curtis tells them that he was quiet and withdrawn in class, before offering to have a talk with him. Curtis tells Hendrix that it took guts to come back to school and tries to persuade him to go to the common room, but Hendrix says he does not have any friends and points out that the girls in their class were laughing at him. Curtis tells him that he is over-thinking things and the girls could have been laughing about anything. Curtis then tells Hendrix that if he ever needs to talk, he should come find him. At the end of the day, Curtis sees Hendrix punch his locker, which has been graffitied, and Hendrix yells that he hates school before kicking over a bin. After Brent Colefax's (Texas Watterston) personal records are uploaded to the online student resource centre, Jane and Susan ask Curtis whether he is responsible, but he tells them that he was only uploading study resources. They later apologise for jumping the gun, and Curtis admits that he is worried about Brent and asks to put in some extra hours with him. Curtis offers to oversee Year 13 while Jane attends a conference, as he is keen to gain experience and show Susan that he can take on more responsibility. Jane is not sure because of Hendrix and Brent's behaviour, but she allows Curtis to take the class on a trial run.

Upon Jane's return, she learns Curtis has started a vocational project with Hendrix and Brent. She feels that he has taken over the program, which Curtis apologises for. Although Curtis thinks the project is good for the boys, Jane tells him that it is not possible to include more activities as Year 13 has been planned already. Curtis informs Hendrix and Brent that the project has been cancelled, but Hendrix says he will talk with Susan and that he and Brent will move the power tools to The Hive in preparation. Susan allows the project to go ahead, which upsets Jane as she thinks Curtis has gone over her head. She later finds Curtis and Susan discussing the project at Susan's home, and expresses her unhappiness at the way things were handled. Jane wants the project scrapped and tries to make Susan choose between them, but Susan refuses. The following day, Jane and Curtis try to work things out. Curtis tells Jane that he is not trying to undermine her, but he has more to contribute than she realises. Jane offers to think more about his project. After learning Curtis is Vera Punt's (Sally-Anne Upton) nephew, Jane visits Vera in the hospital in order to speak with Curtis. He reveals that he turns his cochlear implant down, as he cannot put up with his aunt's whinging. Jane tells him that she has decided to let the project go ahead as long as Curtis checks in with her weekly. Jane later suggests that Curtis move the power tools from The Hive. When he eventually makes it there, he finds the tools in a van and confronts Holden Brice (Toby Derrick) as he is about to leave. Holden strikes Curtis in the head with a torch, damaging his cochlear implant and preventing Curtis from hearing Nicolette Stone's (Charlotte Chimes) cries for help. Curtis manages to give Levi Canning (Richie Morris) a statement, and is checked over by paramedics, before he is given a temporary implant. He then goes to Susan's house to tell her what happened and expresses his guilt over Nicolette. Levi later shows Curtis a sketch of Holden and Curtis acknowledges that it is the same person who attacked him.

Jane visits a school in Mildura, leaving Curtis in charge of Year 13. When Jane returns, she tells Susan and Curtis of her plans to tweak the school's programme. She takes over from Curtis and tries to help with Hendrix's project, but he does not appreciate her interference and Curtis steps in to distract Jane. He later gets Hendrix to open up to him about his problems, which impresses Jane, until she learns that Curtis knows the principal of the Mildura school and she realises was not sought out for her expertise. Curtis admits that he just wanted some space to prove himself. Days later, Toadfish Rebecchi (Ryan Moloney) thanks Curtis for a character reference he has written for Brent. Curtis asks Toadie if he has researched any other options for Brent and explains a way to keep Brent out of the prison system. They visit Brent together at the remand centre, where Brent apologises to Curtis for everything that happened to him. Curtis then tells Brent that in order to avoid a custodial sentence he could join the Australian Defence Force, which Brent agrees to. A couple of weeks later, Curtis meets up with Jesse Porter and after flirting with each other, they leave Harold's Café in order to spend the night together. Jesse later ignores Curtis's text messages and eventually tells him that he is busy that week, but he will try to meet up with him again soon. The following week, Curtis and Jesse meet in Harold's and Jesse asks if he has ruined his chance. Curtis asks him out for a drink and Jesse suggests meeting up later. Jesse later breaks up with Curtis, claiming that he is too busy. Curtis opens up to Hendrix about the break up and wonders if it is because he is deaf. Hendrix tells him that Jesse was dating someone else and Curtis confronts Jesse outside the hotel. Jesse tries to explain, but when he touches Curtis on the shoulder, Curtis tells Jesse to get off him and shoves him onto the luggage trolley, before leaving. Months later, Curtis voices his concerns to Jane and Susan about Zara Selwyn's (Freya Van Dyke) bad influence on other students. He also puts out a bin fire when Jane freezes at the sight. He tells her and Susan that according to the fire captain there were cigarette butts in the bin, which Jane believes Zara could have smoked. Susan refuses to jump to conclusions, while Curtis says they need to find out who was in the area at the time. He later assists with Aubrey Laing's (Etoile Little) transition to homeschooling, and accompanies her grandmother Shannon Laing (Francesca Waters) to a hearing test. Curtis goes to a Ramsay Street party with Vera a few months later.

== Jesse Porter ==
Jesse Porter
- Neighbours character
- Portrayed by: Cameron Robbie
- First appearance: 19 March 2021
- Last appearance: 4 October 2021
- Introduced by: Jason Herbison
In-universe information
- Occupation: Bartender; Ceremonial lifeguard; Lassiter's Hotel concierge
- Mother: Julie Quill
- Brothers: Tom Quill (step)
- Sisters: Shay Quill (step)
- Half-brothers: Archie Quill

Jesse Porter, played by Cameron Robbie, made his first appearance on 19 March 2021. The character and Robbie's casting was announced on 16 January 2021. Robbie's older sister Margot Robbie previously appeared in the show from 2008 to 2011 as Donna Freedman. Cameron secured the role of Jesse after an audition and began filming his guest appearance in late 2020. Jesse is a lifeguard who secures a summer job at Lassiter's Hotel, as he tries to work out what he really wants to do with his life. Maddison Hockey and Jess Pullar of TV Week reported that Jesse "comes from a wealthy background, but has decided to break away from the pressures he's had placed on him growing up." Robbie described him as "a pretty fun-loving type of guy" and said there would be "some twists and turns within his story line!" Four months after his introduction, it emerged that Jesse is connected to the Quill family, who run a rival hotel chain, and has been helping them to plot against Lassiters. Robbie thought his "slow-burn" introduction was "a pretty fun character development" and believed that the pay-off when his identity was exposed was also a fun moment for viewers. He explained to Daniel Kilkelly of Digital Spy that spying for the Quills was not Jesse's plan, and he hoped the audience would enjoy finding out the reason why Jesse felt that he could not say no. Robbie continued "Jesse is feeling a lot of pressure on himself. He puts the weight of the world on his shoulders while he's doing his best to please others. But at the same time, he's a little lost. A lot of it is serving an end goal, but also taking opportunities as they come along." He also said Jesse was trying to avoid his own "demons", but felt that he was a good person who has been lying to himself for a long time.

Jesse is hired to work as a bartender and ceremonial lifeguard at The Flamingo Bar, which is located on the fringes of Lassister's Lake. He helps out Roxy Willis (Zima Anderson) and Sheila Canning (Colette Mann), and poses for photos with them to help promote the bar. He later asks them how is he doing, as the job description was vague. After several mistakes, he admits that he has always had trouble remembering people's names. Jesse backs Roxy up when she tells Terese Willis (Rebekah Elmaloglou) that she is the perfect candidate for the bar manager role. Jesse points out Roxy's skills in remembering orders. Terese tells Roxy that she needs to put in an actual application, causing Jesse to apologise for being a bad wingman. He tells Roxy that she would make a great boss, as she is the type of person that makes everything fun. Later, Jesse, Roxy and Kyle Canning (Chris Milligan) approach Paul Robinson (Stefan Dennis) and Terese to ask for permission to set up a volleyball court at The Flamingo Bar and Terese accepts. Jesse also presents the bar's new merchandise. During The Flamingo Bar's first volleyball tournament, Jesse is seen scoring and umpiring the matches. Jesse takes part in the Longest Workout competition and ends up helping Melanie Pearson (Lucinda Cowden) hide from her boyfriend Toadfish Rebecchi (Ryan Moloney). Paul later approaches Jesse to ask about his interests, career path and relationship status, which Jesse initially confuses for flirting. Jesse wins the competition and is congratulated by Harlow Robinson (Jemma Donovan). After Harlow is offered the job of Terese's EA, Paul arranges for her to talk to Jesse about feeding concerns up to management, something an EA would deal with. Harlow tells Jesse that Paul has an ulterior motive in getting them to talk, knowing that he disapproves of her current relationship. Jesse convinces Harlow to take the EA job as she can push more green initiatives. Jesse later meets up with Curtis Perkins (Nathan Borg) for lunch, but they spend the time flirting and decide to go elsewhere.

Jesse organises a picnic for Harlow to celebrate her taking the EA job and they discuss their plan to fake a relationship between them, so Paul will stay out of her personal life. Harlow thanks Jesse for going along with the plan and he tells her that he likes hanging out with her. Jesse meets with Shay Quill (Yasmin Kassim) from Lassiters' rivals, the Quill Group. Jesse gives Shay a report about a drive-in movie night idea that Harlow has had. When Shay demands more information, Jesse tells her that Paul and Terese already know the Quill Group stole their film festival idea and that they will eventually figure out that he is spying on them. Shay tells Jesse not to tell her it cannot be done and questions if he would say that to Julie Quill (Gail Easdale), Jesse says no and that he will work it out. Jesse asks Paul to be his mentor and Paul agrees to consider the idea. Jesse also arranges to meet up for a date with Curtis to make up for ghosting him. He later learns that Harlow and Roxy know about him and Curtis, but they assure him they will not say anything. Roxy catches Jesse in Terese's office, and later that day, he meets up with Shay and admits that it has not been easy to find out the information she wants. Shay tells him to copy everything, as she wants to know every detail about what Lassiters is planning. Jesse says he is doing his best, but Shay replies that it is not enough and he is about as good for the business as his mother, Julie. The Quill Group pull out of hosting the film festival after Harlow tells Jesse that the organisers are facing a big lawsuit and he relays the information to Shay. Lassiters then wins the film festival contract and Harlow tells Jesse that Lassiters is also planning on buying some land next to a Quill Hotel in a bid undermine their business. Jesse breaks up with Curtis, claiming that he is too busy, but Curtis later confronts him about dating someone else and pushes him into the luggage trolley.

Terese learns Jesse's true identity and confronts him. He admits that he hated spying, but Terese fires him and tells him not to come near her family again. When Jesse comes to collect his belongings from the hotel, he tells Harlow that he let his family buy the land, as a way of apologising to her and Terese. He admits that he does not want anything to do with the Quills, and later apologises to Paul and Terese, before mentioning that he was happy being around them. Terese later invites Jesse to stay at the hotel after learning he has been thrown out of his apartment by his step-siblings, who blame him for the collapse of the Quill hotel. Terese decides to invest in the hotel, but is later forced to pull out of the deal. She gives Jesse a job at Lassiters instead and becomes his mentor. The Lassiters staff go on strike when Harlow is promoted to a job they feel she did not earn, but Jesse does not join them. He later advises Harlow in her decision to accept a demotion and helps liaise with the striking staff. When thanking him for his actions, Terese inadvertently calls Jesse by the name of her son Josh (Harley Bonner), whose death Julie was responsible for. After putting the initial awkwardness of her mistake behind them, the two continue to grow closer. After learning more about Josh, Jesse contacts his mother and she asks him to visit her. Terese offers to accompany Jesse to visit Julie in prison. Jesse learns from Terese that the Quill Group has debts from a bad deal, which is why the sale fell through, and he says he will discuss it with Julie. Paul accuses Jesse of having an agenda when it comes to the investment and warns him to keep Terese out of it. On the day of the visit, Paul's son David Tanaka (Takaya Honda) tells Jesse that the family are concerned about his relationship with Terese. He encourages him to distance himself from her and move on if he really cares about Terese. Jesse fails to show up at the prison, resigns from Lassiter's and leaves for Sydney. Jesse returns the following month after being contacted by Paul, and shares a final conversation with Terese.

== Sheila Canning ==
Sheila Canning
- Neighbours character
- Portrayed by: Shareena Clanton
- First appearance: 7 April 2021
- Last appearance: 24 May 2021
- Introduced by: Jason Herbison
In-universe information
- Occupation: Businesswoman; Owner of The Hive

Sheila Canning, played by Shareena Clanton, made her first appearance on 7 April 2021. Clanton's casting was announced on 29 March 2021. She filmed her guest stint from October 2020 to March 2021. Clanton's character shares the same name as show regular Sheila Canning, played by Colette Mann, leading to a misunderstanding between the two women. Clanton previously played the role of Doreen Anderson in Wentworth, a character Mann originated on Prisoner. David Knox of TV Tonight called it "cheeky casting". While she is visiting Erinsborough, Clanton's Sheila does some online shopping, but her items are mistakenly sent to Mann's Sheila, who gives some of them away to friends. The women later meet and Mann's Sheila realises she has stolen Clanton's Sheila's mail. Shortly before her first appearance aired, Clanton made allegations of racism and misogyny on the Neighbours set and declared she would never work for the show again. A critic for the Evening Express had a positive reaction to the character's stint, writing "Her stay in Erinsborough may have been short, but it's certainly been memorable".

After arriving in Erinsborough, Sheila compliments Susan Kennedy (Jackie Woodburne) on her earrings. Sheila visits The Hive, an arts hot desking space, and helps Ned Willis (Ben Hall) wipe blue paint from his face. She observes that photos on The Hive's website did not capture how large the place was. Paul Robinson (Stefan Dennis) reveals that Sheila is a potential buyer of the business. After smelling Chloe Brennan's (April Rose Pengilly) hand cream and figuring out that it was the same one she recently purchased, Sheila realises that someone else has been receiving her mail. She then notices the shoes she had ordered being worn by Sheila Canning and confronts her, before revealing that they share the same name and that the items were for her. Erinsborough Sheila apologises for taking the items and, with the help of Roxy Willis (Zima Anderson), gathers all them up and tries to give them back, but Sheila does not want them and asks to be left alone. During a meeting about The Hive, Paul tells Sheila how successful the business is at the moment and that he is only selling as he is getting out of real estate. Sheila also realises that Ned is a successful artist and tells him he is wasted working for Paul. A USB containing the real financial details and bookings at The Hive is slipped under Sheila's hotel room door, which leads her to cancel the deal with Paul. She later thanks Ned for his help, although he denies it was him. After seeing how passionate Ned is about art, Sheila tells Paul that she wants to buy The Hive after all, but at a lower price. Ned helps Sheila out with some painting lessons and she asks him about plans for his next project. She also learns about his girlfriend Yashvi Rebecchi (Olivia Junkeer) and how she is not into art as much as they are. Sheila later asks her assistant to gather information on Ned. She also attends a lunch at Sheila's home, along with Bea Nilsson (Bonnie Anderson) and Levi Canning (Richie Morris), where she offers to teach them her Aboriginal language after speaking with an elder.

Sheila brings her hire car to the garage to be looked at by Bea, who finds a folder containing information on Ned inside. Sheila later overhears Roxy and Kyle Canning (Chris Milligan) talking about her and they tell her about the file Bea found. Ned confronts her and Sheila explains that she asked her assistant to look into him as she is considering turning The Hive into an open art space and wants him to run it. Bea apologises for taking the file, while Ned tells Sheila that he trusts her and opens up about his past. Sheila leaves a negative review for the garage online, and although she later takes it down, Bea is fired from her job. When Ned finds Sheila getting emotional over the painting they are working on, he invites the other Sheila to talk to her. Sheila 2 opens up about the death of her grandmother, and how she could not get home to see her in time due to border closures. Terese Willis (Rebekah Elmaloglou) uncovers Ned's part in The Hive's leaked financial details and Sheila opts to buy the business at the asking price, so Paul does not find out. Ned presents Sheila with a new name and logo for the gallery, and they share an intimate moment when they hold hands. They both act awkwardly around one another when they are later paired together for a local volleyball competition. Ned later admits that he has feelings for Sheila, but then quits the gallery. This prompts Sheila to realise that it is time to visit her family in Perth to make peace with her grandmother's death. Shortly beforehand, Bea opens up to Sheila about her relationship with Levi. Sheila suggests that they have a rehab relationship and she encourages Bea to be honest with Levi, leading to their break up. Sheila offers to buy the car Levi bought Bea, so they can go on a road trip together. Sheila later urges Ned to tell Yashvi what happened between them, before informing him that she has decided to drop the gallery idea for the Hive. Sheila accuses Sheila 2 of being responsible for Bea and Levi's break up. She also mentions that the sound recording equipment was left on at The Hive and recorded her conversation with Ned, which Yashvi also heard. Before she leaves Erinsborough, Sheila visits Ned to say goodbye and asks Kyle to tell his grandmother that she is grateful for their friendship. Sheila eventually comes outside and apologises to Sheila 2 for blaming her for Bea and Levi's break up. Sheila and Bea then drive out of Ramsay Street.

== Abigail Tanaka ==
Abigail Tanaka
- Neighbours character
- Portrayed by: Mary Finn (2021); Axelle Austin (2021–2022); Juliet Basaraba (2022); Nikita Kato (2023–2025)
- Duration: 2021–2025
- First appearance: 10 August 2021
- Last appearance: 11 December 2025
- Introduced by: Jason Herbison
In-universe information
- Family: Robinson
- Father: Leo Tanaka
- Mother: Britney Barnes
- Grandfathers: Paul Robinson; George Barnes
- Grandmothers: Kim Taylor; Annie Barnes
- Uncles: David Tanaka; Aaron Brennan
- First cousins: Harlow Robinson; Isla Tanaka-Brennan
- Other relatives: Glen Donnelly; Kiri Durant; Lucy Robinson; Annie Robinson-Pappas

Abigail Tanaka, played by Nikita Kato, is the daughter of Leo Tanaka (Tim Kano) and Britney Barnes (Montana Cox). Her first on-screen appearance is made on 10 August 2021. The character was previously played by infant actresses Mary Finn, Axelle Austin and Juliet Basaraba. Abigail is introduced as a central part of a baby swap storyline that occurs when surrogate Nicolette Stone (Charlotte Chimes) runs away with David Tanaka (Takaya Honda) and Aaron Brennan's (Matt Wilson) unborn child. Honda explained the storyline had been planned since December 2019, although the surrogate was not originally intended to be Nicolette. Nicolette hands Abigail over, posing her as David and Aaron’s daughter, Isla Tanaka-Brennan (Axelle Austin), despite her actually being the daughter of Britney and David’s brother, Leo. Abigail's introduction provided a reason for Leo to remain in Erinsborough. Abigail was credited as "Isla Tanaka-Brennan" for her first month of appearances. When the truth was revealed, she began being credited as "Abigail Tanaka". When Abigail subsequently left Erinsborough Finn continued on the series as Isla, with Austin assuming the role of Abigail upon the character's return before being replaced by Basaraba in 2022. In the 2023 revival, Abigail returns, now played by Nikita Kato.

Nicolette Stone hands Abigail over to Paul Robinson (Stefan Dennis), telling him that she is his granddaughter and named Isla. Paul gives Abigail to David Tanaka and Aaron Brennan, who believe Abigail is their child. At the hospital, Abigail is diagnosed as anemic, and David and Aaron take her home, where she meets Leo Tanaka, Chloe Brennan (April Rose Pengilly), Terese Willis (Rebekah Elmaloglou), Jane Harris (Annie Jones) and Harlow Robinson (Jemma Donnovan). Abigail is later kidnapped by Britney Barnes during a film festival. Once she is found, Britney reveals her real name is Abigail and that she is the daughter of Britney and David's brother, Leo. It is revealed that Britney and Leo were in a relationship while in New York City, but Leo left before Britney was able to explain that she was pregnant, so went to Erinsborough to tell Leo. She met Nicolette and ran to Canberra with her, having the baby. She experienced post-natal depression and allowed Nicolette to give Abigail to Paul. After the truth is revealed, Abigail is returned to the care of Britney and Leo. They later decide to move to Wollongong and take Abigail to say goodbye to David, Aaron, Paul and Harlow. Abigail and Britney return to Erinsborough for Christmas. Britney protects Abigail from a falling telegraph pole, but dies during the process, leaving a grief-stricken Leo left to single parent Abigail. After Abigail falls off the couch and is rushed to hospital, Leo asks David and Aaron to raise his daughter. Just before official custody documents are signed, Chloe convinces Leo not to give up on his daughter and Abigail is placed back in the care of her father, to the disappointment of Aaron. Leo continues looking after Abigail and takes her to a Ramsay Street party in July 2022.

== Evelyn Farlow ==
Evelyn Farlow
- Neighbours character
- Portrayed by: Paula Arundell
- First appearance: 24 August 2021
- Last appearance: 6 September 2021
- Introduced by: Jason Herbison
In-universe information
- Sons: Levi Canning

Evelyn Farlow, played by Paula Arundell, made her first appearance on 24 August 2021. The character and Arundell's casting details were announced on 12 August 2021. Daniel Kilkelly of Digital Spy reported that she will be on-screen for approximately two weeks. Evelyn is the mother of established regular Levi Canning (Richie Morris). Evelyn's beliefs force Levi to keep his polyamorous relationship with Amy Greenwood (Jacinta Stapleton), who is concurrently dating Ned Willis (Ben Hall), a secret during most of her stay.

Evelyn comes to Ramsay Street to surprise her son Levi Canning, who is delighted to see her. Evelyn hands him a belated birthday gift and explains that she is staying in Erinsborough for a couple of days in between work contracts. Levi's grandmother Sheila Canning (Colette Mann) reassures Evelyn that Levi had a birthday celebration. Levi asks his mother how her family is back in Portland and Evelyn says they are well and that the kids helped her pick out his gift. Evelyn is then greeted by Levi's cousin, Kyle Canning (Chris Milligan), and his girlfriend, Roxy Willis (Zima Anderson). Kyle later explains that Evelyn's conservative parents did not allow her to bring Levi up, as he was the product of an affair with a married man. As Evelyn and Levi catch up, they discuss his work and a podcast they listened to. Evelyn tells him about a new keto bread she has found for him and Sheila adds that she has been making all his meals keto-friendly. She then suggests that Evelyn and Levi have dinner at The Waterhole, where she works. Evelyn and Sheila briefly talk about Levi's childhood attack, before Levi joins them. After their meal, Evelyn admits that it was decent considering that it was pub food. Sheila is insulted by this and remarks that Evelyn has been cold to her ever since she arrived. Sheila asks what is going on and Evelyn says nothing is wrong. Later that night, Sheila apologises for overreacting and says that she is protective of her patch. Evelyn then admits that she has always felt excluded from Canning events. Sheila tells her that she always had an invite, but she just stopped coming. Evelyn says that Levi's stepmother, Jackie, turned the Cannings against her and that Sheila did not do anything about it. Evelyn explains that she always felt shame being around Levi. Evelyn then reveals that she tried to visit Levi in Erinsborough three times previously, before backing down, so she asks Sheila to stay out of her way.

Sheila, determined to make amends, apologises for how Evelyn feels. Sheila says that it was hard with Jackie and that she never realised she was shutting Evelyn out. Evelyn says that it was hard to be judged when Frank Jr was not being judged. Evelyn and Levi then go to The Waterhole, where they see Amy Greenwood kissing Ned Willis. Evelyn asks if Levi knows them and he says that they live on Ramsay Street. Amy and Ned approach Evelyn and Levi introduces them to her, telling her they are girlfriend and boyfriend. Once they walk off, Evelyn says that their relationship will not work due to their age difference. Kyle and Evelyn talk about The 82 and Evelyn apologises for the death of Kyle's father, Gary Canning (Damien Richardson). After visiting The 82, Sheila asks Evelyn how long she is staying for and Evelyn assumes Sheila wants her to leave, but Sheila corrects her. Evelyn later tells Levi that she is thinking of staying longer so the two of them can spend more time together. A few days later, Evelyn and Levi go to The Waterhole and order hot chocolates, where they see Amy and Ned sitting together. Evelyn tells Sheila that their age difference is too big and Sheila says that Levi would never get involved in a situation like that. After bickering, Sheila tells Evelyn that she may not find Levi as pure as she thinks he is.

Evelyn then finds Levi in Harold's Café and confronts him, now aware of his relationship with Amy. Levi tries to explain the situation, but Evelyn rushes off. Levi discovers that Karl Kennedy (Alan Fletcher) told Evelyn about his relationship with Amy. Evelyn tells Levi that her opinions do not matter to him. Amy later talks to Evelyn and says that the both of them care for Levi, so they should both try to make it easier for him. Amy says that just because she is also dating Ned, her feelings for Levi will not change. Evelyn disagrees by saying that a romantic relationship cannot be shared. Amy adds that Sheila feels the same. Evelyn says Levi deserves much better, but Amy tells her that Levi is happy. Amy apologises for keeping the relationship a secret. Evelyn sees Levi and invites him to take a seat with her and Amy and the three of them get to know each other. Evelyn has a go at Sheila for keeping it from her and then asks if the only reason she asked her to stay was to break Levi and Amy up. Sheila says that she only had good intentions. Levi and Amy invite Evelyn over for dinner and Evelyn announces that she is leaving tomorrow. Evelyn tells Levi she is still uncomfortable with his relationship, but trusts him enough to make his own decisions. After dinner, Evelyn packs her bags and she departs the following day.

== Britney Barnes ==
Britney Barnes
- Neighbours character
- Portrayed by: Montana Cox
- Duration: 2021–2022
- First appearance: 9 September 2021
- Last appearance: 24 January 2022
- Introduced by: Jason Herbison
In-universe information
- Father: George Barnes
- Mother: Annie Barnes
- Daughters: Abigail Tanaka

Britney Barnes, played by Montana Cox, made her first appearance on 9 September 2021. Cox's casting was announced on the show's Instagram account on 13 June, before Susannah Alexander of Digital Spy confirmed her character name the following day. Cox began filming on the set during the same week and the role marks her acting debut. She stated: "I'm so excited for my guest role in Neighbours. For my first ever acting role to be on Ramsay Street is such a privilege and I can't wait for everyone to meet my character." Cox later stated that she was nervous about going onto set due to her lack of acting experience and she did not know what to expect, but the cast and crew helped make "the transition very easy." Britney is introduced as part of a storyline involving David Tanaka (Takaya Honda) and Aaron Brennan's (Matt Wilson) niece, Abigail Tanaka (Mary Finn), who she appears "emotionally invested" in. David and Aaron are in belief that Abigail is their daughter Isla, when she is actually Britney's. Cox explained: "Brittany [sic] knows the boys have baby Isla. She wants to get close to them so she can see what the situation is and how their baby is." Britney kidnaps Isla when David and Aaron look away for a moment, leaving them to believe their former housemate Nicolette Stone (Charlotte Chimes) has taken her. Cox said her character is not "thinking straight" when she takes the baby, but she feels that it is "her only option." Days after her introduction, it was confirmed that Britney is the baby's biological mother, and that David's brother, Leo Tanaka (Tim Kano), is her father. Following their departure at the end of September, both Britney and Abigail return in December, as part of the show's Christmas episodes. Shortly thereafter, Britney is killed in a storm that falls upon Erinsborough. This comes after she and Leo finally reunite, and her death causes Leo to become a struggling single parent.

Britney walks into Harold's Café and sees David Tanaka, Aaron Brennan and Harlow Robinson (Jemma Donovan) talking together and looking after Isla Tanaka-Brennan. Britney sits down at a nearby table and listens in on their conversation. On Father's Day, Britney continues to stalk David, Aaron and Isla in the Lassiter's complex. After taking a photo, she approaches them and tells them that she could not help but notice how cute their daughter is. Later, Britney visits The Flamingo Bar and asks Roxy Willis (Zima Anderson) if the upcoming Shorts and Briefs Film Festival is family-friendly, to which Roxy says it is. Britney then breaks into 32 Ramsay Street and holds one of Isla's favourite toys. As a series of fireworks go off at the end of the film festival, David and Aaron become distracted and Britney snatches Isla out of their car without them noticing. Constable Levi Canning (Richie Morris) finds Britney and her baby in the Erinsborough Community Centre, where she reveals that the baby is hers.

Nicolette returns to Erinsborough with David and Aaron's real baby, Isla Tanaka-Brennan (Axelle Austin; also Finn), and explains everything. Britney fell pregnant with Leo Tanaka's child after they got together in New York City. Britney came to Erinsborough to tell Leo and attended an antenatal class, where she met Nicolette. Nicolette and Britney became good friends and Nicolette found out that Britney's child is Leo Tanaka's, who is the uncle of the baby Nicolette was carrying. Britney went to tell Leo that she is pregnant at his vineyard and saw him kissing Chloe Brennan (April Rose Pengilly), so ran off. Britney left for Canberra with Nicolette and had her baby, but began experiencing post-natal depression. Britney allowed Nicolette to give her baby to Paul Robinson (Stefan Dennis), who thought Britney's baby was Nicolette's.

While cradling her baby in the hospital, Britney is greeted by David and Aaron, who have just discovered the truth, where she explains that her baby is named Abigail. Aaron is reluctant to give Abigail to Britney. Leo walks into the room and meets his daughter, then asks Britney what her plan is, to which she explains that she does not have a plan. Britney says that giving up Abigail was the biggest mistake of her life and that she did not know if Leo wanted to be part of Abigail's life. Terese Willis (Rebekah Elmaloglou) then invites Britney and Abigail into 22 Ramsay Street. Britney and Leo decide to start over as friends for Abigail's sake. However, when Leo explains their situation to a nanny, Britney gets mad at him and then accuses him of running away when he says he is going to work. Britney and Leo fail to make amends, causing Terese to convince the two of them to sit down and discuss their issues. Terese offers to babysit Abigail, but while she is, she has to rush to work and lets David and Aaron look after Abigail, who are struggling to bond with their real baby. When Britney returns, she is angry with Terese, David and Aaron and tells David and Aaron to leave. Britney then admits to Leo that she is struggling to bond with Abigail in Erinsborough. Leo informs David that Britney wants to move back to New York. Leo tells Britney that he does not think New York is the right place and suggests moving to New South Wales, where her family are. Britney and Leo take Abigail to say goodbye to David, Aaron, Paul and Harlow, before moving to Wollongong.

Britney and Abigail return to Erinsborough for Christmas, where Britney apologises for her attitude during her last visit. Britney decides to stay for longer and Nicolette suspects it has something to do with Leo. Later, Britney suggests Leo hosts a ladies' lunch at the winery to attain new investors. Afterwards, she admits to Nicolette that she began enjoying her time in Wollongong with Leo a lot. On the day of the lunch, Britney explains she has been promoting the lunch on her socials, but the event does not go as smoothly as she hopes when Vera Punt (Sally-Anne Upton) makes an enemy of everyone. Nicolette later tells Britney that she has her full support if she were to rekindle her relationship with Leo, who continues to bond with Britney over Abigail at the winery and asks her to Roxy and Kyle Canning's (Chris Milligan) wedding. At the wedding, Nicolette inadvertently reveals to Leo how Britney feels, and he kisses her after the ceremony. When a pylon pole falls onto The Flamingo Bar, Britney protects Abigail by taking most of the damage, before she dies from fatal injuries.

== Felicity Higgins ==
Felicity Higgins
- Neighbours character
- Portrayed by: Isabella Giovinazzo
- First appearance: 6 October 2021
- Last appearance: 10 November 2021
- Introduced by: Jason Herbison
In-universe information
- Occupation: Firefighter

Felicity Higgins, played by Isabella Giovinazzo, made her first appearance on 6 October 2021. The character and Giovinazzo's casting details were announced on 8 July 2021. Lisa Wehrstedt of Digital Spy confirmed that Giovinazzo was in the middle of filming her guest stint. Of joining the cast, Giovinazzo stated "I was a little nervous, because this was a different show and the cast might have had a different way of working. But I needn't have worried – they're a great bunch, and everyone was very welcoming and kind." Wehrstedt originally reported that Felicity would bring "some risky and dangerous drama to Ramsay Street." Giovinazzo later said that her character would be a love interest for established regular Levi Canning (Richie Morris), who is in a polyamorous relationship with Amy Greenwood (Jacinta Stapleton), who is concurrently dating Ned Willis (Ben Hall). She and Morris worked with intimacy coach Eve Morey and Giovinazzo said she felt "safe and excited to create something lovely" between their characters. Giovinazzo later said Felicity was "more normal" than previous characters she had played, and described her as being "community minded" and "really nice and straight down the line". The actress also thought Felicity's occupation as a firefighter was "gutsy". Of her romance with Levi, Giovinazzo told Sarah Ellis of Inside Soap that Felicity was hoping to meet someone to create "something lovely with", and she thought Felicity and Levi had similar interests and personalities. When asked about Levi's polyamorous relationship, Giovinazzo explained that her character is "a one girl, one guy kind of person", and she would be hurt and confused if she found out, as she feels that she and Levi have a good connection.

While on her phone, Felicity enters The Waterhole and accidentally bumps into Levi Canning, who spills his drink down his shirt. The two of them joke with each other, before Felicity suggests that they get a drink. As they are talking, Felicity finds out that Levi is a police officer and Levi learns that Felicity is a firefighter, as Ned Willis watches the two of them from afar. Felicity excuses herself from the table and calls someone to let them know that she will have to bail on them because she is having a drink. A week later, Felicity and Levi meet up for another drink. At the end of their date, the two of them walk past Ned and Amy Greenwood. Levi tells Felicity that Amy and Ned are dating, but does not tell her that he is also dating Amy.

Felicity meets Levi for another date, but when Levi is called in to work, Felicity goes to Harold's Café instead. She sees Amy and asks her about Levi's interests, but Amy, believing Felicity was aware of the polyamory, accidentally reveals she is dating Levi too. Felicity then breaks up with Levi. She speaks to Amy at The 82, where Felicity tells Amy that she would not want her boyfriend to have another girlfriend. Ned approaches Felicity at The Flamingo Bar and warns her that Amy is the bar's manager. He then requests that Felicity goes on one more date with Levi, so Levi will break up with Amy. Whilst with Levi, Felicity is approached by Amy, who is attempting to get to know her boyfriend's partner. Levi is proud of Amy, so Felicity and Ned meet to discuss that Ned's plan has not worked. Felicity meets up with Amy and asks her about Levi's preferences in the bedroom. Amy is grossed out and walks off. Ned then books a hotel room for Felicity and Levi, however Amy finds out. Felicity confesses to Levi, who then breaks up with Felicity and says she cannot be trusted. Felicity apologises.

== Wendy Rodwell ==
Wendy Rodwell, played by Candice Leask, made her first appearance on 2 December 2021. Wendy is introduced as the wife of Andrew Rodwell (Lloyd Will) at the Erinsborough Police Ball. Leask continued to make scattered appearances over the next few months and the show's executive producer Jason Herbison later teased, "We also have a new family moving into the street." On screen, Wendy and Andrew buy 26 Ramsay Street and are later added to the opening titles alongside their daughter, Sadie Rodwell (Emerald Chan). Script producer Shane Isheev later revealed that the Rodwells were planned to be the show's "big new family" and the introduction of more Rodwell children would have happened if it were not for the serial's cancellation. Producers introduced Wendy as the new town gossip, with Isheev explaining, "She always puts her foot in her mouth and that came from watching the actress in the police ball – we took what Candice gave us and ran with it." Wendy appeared until the intended 2022 finale, and reprised her regular role in the Neighbours reboot.

== Others ==
Date(s)	Character	Actor	Circumstances
4–11 January	Tally Rennick	Karrin Kose	A woman who attends an illegal blackjack game at 24 Ramsay Street. When Hendrix Greyson loses during the first round, she tells him to sharpen up. She later praises him for his luck when he is given two aces, and she encourages him to increase his bet and take up Kane Jones' offer to clear his gambling debt if he wins. When Tally attends another game, Hendrix notices a gun in her bag and takes it.
5 January	Mary Barnett	Emily Goddard	Toadfish Rebecchi's first Tinder date. She and Toadie get along well, as she tells him about her chocolate shop and her new knitting hobby. However, Toadie later has trouble finding her profile and soon learns that Mary has unmatched with him.
6 January	Hugh Davis	Adam Waycott	A councilman and judge for the upcoming Erinsborough's Best Dish competition, who has lunch at Harold's Café and talks with owner Dipi Rebecchi about his food preferences.
8–26 January	Jacinta Hay	Maurian Spearim	A councillor and judge for Erinsborough's Best Dish Competition, who comes to taste the food at The 82 run by Kyle Canning. Jacinta tells Kyle that she can only have a taste of each dish, as she is judging multiple places in a day, but she admits that she wishes she could have more of his dish. Later that day, as she is leaving Lassiter’s, Jacinta falls ill and is hospitalised. Weeks later, she meets with hotel manager, Terese Willis, about representation among the staff. Terese begins by apologising for a news article in which she is called out for her hypocritical quotes about Australia Day and changing the date. Jacinta points out that she ignored valid concerns about celebrating the day and the hurt it causes the First Nations people five years ago. Terese tells her that it is not how she feels now, but Jacinta questions whether she is there as a token effort, which Terese denies. Jacinta asks her to listen to what she is saying, not what she fears she is saying. Terese later makes a statement about her views on change the date and she pays tribute to Aboriginal Australians and Torres Strait Islanders, which impresses Jacinta. Terese says she intends to be a better ally and Jacinta tells her that she looks forward to working with her.
1–5 February	Mira Dhaliwal	Ashleyrose Gilham	A food safety inspector from the council, who informs Kyle Canning that following a report of poisonous mushrooms in the food, he must cease trade at The 82 immediately while an inspection is carried out. Kyle's partner Roxy Willis meets with Mira to explain that it was her fault the mushrooms ended up in the food and she will not be going near the kitchen again. As Roxy is saying that she will do anything to help Kyle, Mira notices her shirt has come open and she believes Roxy is trying to exchange sexual favours for reopening the business, so she leaves.
12 February	Rai Yan	Kevin Duong	An Erinsborough High student who tells Hendrix Greyson that Brent Colefax's personal records have been uploaded online.
11 March	Khari Breen	Kulan Farah	A university student who asks to meet with Roxy Willis, as he has information about a ring found near to where she was attacked. Khari attempts to flirt with Roxy and buys them both drinks. He soon notices Sheila Canning watching them and Roxy invites her over to join them, where they proceed to tell Khari that they come as a package. Roxy asks him for his information, but Khari admits that he does not know anything, he just saw Roxy putting up fliers and thought she was cute.
17 March	Linda Donaldson	Amelia Best	Emmett Donaldson and Brent Colefax's aunt, who has been caring for Emmett since his mother Jenna Donaldson left. When Linda plans to move to New Zealand for work, Emmett asks to stay with his former foster parents Aaron Brennan and David Tanaka. Linda meets with them to discuss Emmett's options. They assure her that Emmett will be cared for, but Linda insists that due to so much upheaval, he will be better off with her in New Zealand. When Aaron says Emmett is happy with his brother, Linda disagrees, calling Brent nothing but trouble, which he overhears. Emmett makes it clear that he does not want to leave Australia, but Linda tells him that the agency has to decide what is best for him. She has further reservations after learning that Aaron and David's surrogate had to move out. She feels they will not be able to adequately care for Emmett and that she promised Jenna she would do the right thing by him, which means moving to New Zealand with her.
17 March–7 May 2021, 13 July 2022	Holden Brice	Toby Derrick	A gang member, who tracks Brent Colefax down to Ramsay Street. Brent realises that Holden is responsible for breaking into his house, vandalising the Eden University mural, and attacking Roxy Willis. Holden tells him he will stop when Brent shows some loyalty and puts the gang ring back on. Holden then asks Brent to hide a stolen motorbike until he can sell it, then he will be out of Brent's life forever. Brent agrees and hides the bike in the garden shed, before moving it to The Hive. The bike is later found and Holden texts Brent that he owes him via text. Holden and two of his friends steal pastries from The 82 and Roxy gives chase. She finds their camp and recognises their gang symbol painted on the side of a building. Holden later finds Brent and tells him he has another job for him. Brent's younger brother Emmett Donaldson gives Holden his savings to leave Brent alone and Holden agrees. Brent later contacts Holden to tell him about some power tools they can steal from The Hive. Brent helps Holden to load the tools into a van, but leaves when Emmett turns up. Nicolette Stone then interrupts Holden and seemingly recognises him, so he pushes her into a shelving unit when she tries to run. Curtis Perkins also turns up to move the tools and Holden strikes him in the head with a torch, damaging Curtis' cochlear implant. Holden is later arrested. Paul Robinson visits Holden in remand and asks Holden to tell the police about his gang's other illegal activities with the blame falling on Brent, as he wants Brent to stay in prison for a long time. Holden agrees after Paul offers him money. Paul visits Holden the following year, after his son David Tanaka is remanded to the same prison, and offers him money in return for David's protection. Holden introduces himself to David and tells him that Dan Waskett is only targeting him because he knows David is scared of him. He advises David to stand up to Dan, but when he does, Dan attacks him as Holden watches on. He later reveals that he double crossed Paul and had no intention of protecting David.
17 March–29 June	Prue	Uncredited	A pigeon hanging around Gary the pigeon at The 82, that Sheila Canning believes is a reincarnated Prudence Wallace. Sheila decides to adopt Prue as her own pet. When Sheila is talking to the other Sheila Canning in her backyard about her pigeons, Gary and Prue wander around on the table the two Sheilas are sitting at. Toadie Rebecchi and Kyle Canning investigate Number 26 after the alarm goes off and receive a scare from Prue and Gary, who were the ones that set off the alarm whilst in the backyard.
29 March	Rudy Johnson	Isaac Crawley	A penis puppeteer accidentally hired by Dipi Rebecchi, who believed she was getting a Bollywood dancer for her leaving party with Yashvi Rebecchi, Mackenzie Hargreaves and Sheila Canning. Despite the mistake, the women watch Rudy's show.
4 June, 30 August	Prafulla Sahu	Ravi Chand	The Lassiter's Hotel HR manager, who talks to Amy Greenwood about the validity of firing Roxy Willis from The Flamingo Bar. A few months later, Prafulla is approached by Chloe Brennan and they discuss Harlow Robinson's promotion to a new role created by her grandfather Paul Robinson. Prafulla then meets with Paul and Terese Willis and tells Paul it would be in everyone's best interest if he overturns Harlow's promotion, as the Lassiter's staff see it as an act of nepotism.
16–30 June	Mitch Foster	Kevin Hofbauer	Two members of a gang that attacked Levi Canning when he was a child. Levi carries out surveillance on them, but stops when a toy train is left on his doorstep and he informs the police. Mitch and Nelson later approach Levi and sarcastically thank him for sending his boss and the local police to check up on them. Nelson says that one check up is more than enough and hints that the train was a warning, while Mitch tells Levi that he would hate it if something bad were to happen to him again. Levi tells them that the less they see of each other the better. Mitch and Nelson agree and leave. Constable Yashvi Rebecchi brings Mitch and Nelson into the police station for questioning after Levi accuses them of breaking into his house. They both deny going to Ramsay Street to intimidate Levi, his family or Yashvi. They are both released without charge and make a harassment claim against Yashvi. Levi's grandmother, Sheila Canning, warns them against coming near her family and says she will not keep her mouth shut a second time. When they laugh at her, she calls them pathetic, which angers them and they tell her to shut up. Mitch meets with Levi and Yashvi and tells them he wants out and that he does not want his children to end up like him. When Levi tells him he should just stop breaking the law, Mitch says that Nelson will not allow him to stop. Mitch requests police protection, but Levi denies it. Mitch then gives Levi and Yashvi information on a loading dock Nelson owns in exchange for their protection. When Levi and Yashvi arrive at the site, they see Mitch and Nelson loading a box of stolen drones into a van, which they then drive off in. Levi and Yashvi give chase in their car, but when they are about to overtake the van, they notice Sheila's car heading straight towards them. Sheila swerves and Levi and Yashvi's vehicle flips over. As Sheila approaches Levi and Yashvi's car, Mitch and Nelson notice the police helicopter and run into the forest. Levi gives chase and manages to catch up to Nelson, who he pins to the ground and handcuffs. Mitch stops to catch his breath and Levi charges him and pins him to the floor, arresting him. Mitch tries to make Levi feel guilty for leaving Yashvi behind, causing Levi to pin Mitch against a tree. Mitch taunts Levi about the time he bashed him by calling him "Little Levi". Mitch says that Levi can untie him and have a free shot, but Levi pushes him to the ground and asks him if he is still little. Later, Levi tells Sheila and his cousin, Kyle Canning, that Mitch and Nelson are being charged.
16–30 June	Nelson Ryker	Rhys Mitchell	
18 June–19 July	Maya Velasco	Christina O'Neill	A pregnant woman, who attends an antenatal class with Nicolette Stone, Aaron Brennan and David Tanaka. She meets Chloe Brennan, who asks if her partner is running late, but Maya says she has no partner and Aaron explains that she is planning to raise her child by herself. Nicolette suggests that Aaron and David massage Maya during the class. Weeks later, Aaron and David are speaking with Maya before their next antenatal class when Nicolette announces she and Chloe are engaged. Maya congratulates them and offers to save everyone seats while they talk. As they leave the class, Maya asks Nicolette about the proposal and they walk off together discussing it. Maya later brings Nicolette some tea to help her sleep better.
18 June	Dara Kay	Alexander Capper	The host of an antenatal class attended by Maya Velasco, Nicolette Stone, Chloe Brennan, Aaron Brennan and David Tanaka. He starts the class by telling the attendees to start massaging the expectant mothers.
28 June	Fifi Devenue	Carly Daniels	A friend of Jesse Porter, who Amy Greenwood arranges to go on a date with Ned Willis. The pair go to Harold's Café, where Ned complements Fifi on her tattoo and they joke about getting terrible tattoos of each other's names. As Ned and Fifi continue to get along, Amy gets jealous and tells Fifi that Ned has a thing for lizards. Fifi leaves shortly after.
30 June 2021, 16 March 2022, 27 March–14 November 2024	Travis Kellog	Liam McCarthy	A paramedic who brings Yashvi Rebecchi to the hospital. He informs David Tanaka that she has a superficial head wound and signs of internal bleeding, as her blood pressure is dropping. The following year, he attends the scene of a fire at Erinsborough High and brings Mackenzie Hargreaves to the hospital. He tells David that she has significant smoke inhalation with possible airway burns and hypoxia. Travis arrives in an ambulance to Lassiters to take Krista Sinclair into hospital after she is trapped in a sauna. Travis later takes Gino Esposito to hospital after he collapses at Eirini Rising, and admits Cara Varga-Murphy when she is seriously injured at work.
29 July–3 August	Dr. Anna Buke	Fiona Macleod	A doctor who meets with Susan Kennedy under the pretence they are there to discuss Susan's recent MS treatments. When Anna asks Susan what else is going on in her life, Susan tells her she is looking for a new school receptionist and is thinking of hiring Melanie Pearson, who used to work with Anna's husband, Justin. Anna tells Susan not to hire Melanie, as she and Justin had an affair. When Anna and Justin decided to save their marriage, Melanie stalked him at his workplace and home. After Anna warned her off, Melanie retaliated by breaking into her car and leaving a bag of prawns behind, which led to Anna taking out a restraining order. Anna tells Susan that Melanie should not be allowed to work in a school and Susan thanks her for her candour. A few days later, Anna, having seen Justin listed on Melanie's CV, finds and confronts Melanie, telling her that she and Justin made it clear they wanted her out of their lives. While Melanie insists that she did not send that resume and does not want to be part of Anna's life, Anna tells her that she has been personally contacted twice by a principal and a bar manager. Mackenzie Hargreaves, Sheila Canning, and Toadfish Rebecchi try to interrupt, but Anna reminds Melanie the restraining order is still in place and she will call the police if she needs to.
4 August	Nora Ahmadi	Jessica Lu	A university student, who is working on a project with Mackenzie Hargreaves. Nora tells Mackenzie about her recent law internship, explaining that one of the firm's partners seemed creepy to her after she discovered that he had an affair with his assistant a year ago. Nora says that everyone called the assistant a nutbar and that she laughed like a seal. Mackenzie realises Nora is talking about Melanie Pearson and asks whether the partner was Justin Buke, but Nora tells her his name was Michael Cousins.
10 August–11 December 2025	Isla Tanaka-Brennan	Axelle Austin; Mary Finn; Hana Abe-Tucker	Nicolette Stone, David Tanaka and Aaron Brennan's infant daughter, who Nicolette gives birth to after running away to Canberra. The baby's grandfather, Paul Robinson, finds Nicolette and offers her $1 million in exchange for the baby. Nicolette gives Paul Abigail Tanaka instead, then returns to her apartment and cradles her real daughter. When Nicolette returns to Erinsborough, she brings her baby with her. The baby was credited as "Nicolette's Baby" for her first two appearances, until her name was revised to "Isla Tanaka-Brennan", after her true identity was revealed. Isla meets David and Aaron, and Nicolette says that the original parenting agreement – in which Nicolette was to give the baby to David and Aaron – needs to be revisited. Isla and Nicolette move into Number 32, where Isla's parents agree to a three-way custody split. David, Aaron and Nicolette take Isla to a Ramsay Street party in July 2022. When Neighbours returns, it is revealed that Isla has moved away with Nicolette, David and Aaron, but they soon move back to Erinsborough.
25 August	Lorant Mathieson	Ronn Kurtz	The head of the Shorts and Briefs Film Festival, who congratulates Amy Greenwood on the impressive set up for the launch event.
6 September	Justin Buke	Mick O'Malley	Anna Buke's husband, who had previously had an affair with Melanie Pearson. Justin meets with Melanie and they talk with each other. Toadie Rebecchi, whose current relationship with Melanie is facing hardship, and Rose Walker notice Melanie talking to Justin. Later, Rose privately thanks Justin and he explains that the chat cleared the air between him and Melanie. Rose reassures Justin that she will withdraw her complaint to the police about Anna vandalising her car. Justin is satisfied and tells Rose the situation between her, Melanie and Toadie is none of his business.
9 September 2021, 5 January 2022, 30 May 2022	Rebecca Wright	Wallis Murphy-Munn	A Lassiter's Hotel staff member, who led the Lassiter's staff on strike, after Harlow Robinson was promoted by her grandfather, Paul Robinson, to a newly created role. Rebecca enters the Lassiter's laundry room and dumps a basket of dirty clothes in front of Harlow for her to clean, before calling her a princess. Harlow says that Rebecca already turned the Lassiter's staff against her and got her demoted, as Roxy Willis watches on. Rebecca tells her the rest of the staff have managed to work their way out of laundry duty and now it is Harlow's turn. Rebecca later has a drink at The Flamingo Bar. A few months later, Rebecca asks Harlow to help her clean Glen Donnelly's hotel room, but Harlow explains his room is off limits for her, so Rebecca asks her to take the dirty laundry instead. Rebecca and Katrina Marshall later tell Harlow they are angry about having to pick up her slack since she is modelling in the Fashion Week event.
13 September	Kevin Irving	Wally Elnour	A bartender, who serves Harlow Robinson at The Flamingo Bar.
16 September–11 November	Dr Cye Alavi	Amir Rahimzadeh	A doctor, who invites Hendrix Greyson into a testicular cancer testing booth. After the check-up, Dr Alavi informs Hendrix that he found a lump, which could be a benign cyst or a blocked tube, but he tells Hendrix to book an appointment with his GP as soon as possible. Noticing Hendrix's reaction, the doctor asks if he would like to call anyone to meet them, but Hendrix tells him he will be fine. Days later, Hendrix imagines himself visiting Dr Alavi and being informed that he has cancer. The following day, Dr Alavi is paid a visit by Hendrix and explains that the lump found was just a benign cyst and that his recent stomach ache is most likely due to stress and over-exercising. Dr Alavi meets with Kyle Canning three weeks later to inform him that his stage II testicular cancer has spread. After Kyle has surgery, Dr Alavi suggests having family around to hear the results. Kyle insists on hearing them and Dr Alavi explains that cancer was found in both testicles, so they were both removed during the operation.
27 September	Dion Rivera	PJ Van Gyen	A bouncer working a party at The Pavilion in the Lassiter's Complex. He sees Hendrix Greyson knock over some glasses and comes over to check everything is okay. Roxy Willis assures him that it was an accident and she is going to get Hendrix some water. Hendrix gets in Dion's face and mouths off to him, resulting in Dion manhandling him out of the party. Hendrix tries to get in via a back gate, but Dion opens it and Hendrix tells him he is ruining everything. Dion stops Hendrix from barging past him and closes the gate.
5 October	Greg Cantor	Tony Barea	The owner of Lanzini's restaurant and a client of Toadfish Rebecchi, who Mackenzie Hargreaves recognises and speaks to in Harold's Café. Greg says that he will offer Hendrix Greyson work experience if he likes his food, as he owes Mackenzie. Greg becomes impatient waiting for his food and checks at the counter to see where Hendrix is, but when he does not see him, Greg leaves.
25 October	Juliana Ayres	Chelsea Gibb	Two lawyers hired by David Tanaka and Aaron Brennan to help win custody of Isla Tanaka-Brennan from Nicolette Stone. Juliana and Pia suggest taking note of every inappropriate action conducted by Nicolette. When David and Aaron explain that they are worried the case will become too dirty, Juliana and Pia explain that it is the only way that custody battles are done. The following year, Pia meets with David and Aaron to formalise a parenting arrangement with Leo Tanaka for Abigail Tanaka, but Leo changes his mind shortly after she arrives.
25 October 2021, 8 March 2022	Pia Nash	Sarah Melody Hallam	
1 November	Betty De Silva	Priscilla Castel	A photographer, who is hired to take family photos of Isla Tanaka-Brennan, David Tanaka, Aaron Brennan, Nicolette Stone and Jane Harris. When Betty sees that David, Aaron and Nicolette keep arguing, she suggests that they reschedule the photoshoot, but Jane insists they continue.
10 November	Seth Okaine	Noah Janssen	A customer at The Flamingo Bar, who tells Roxy Willis that his Bloody Mary does not have alcohol in it. Roxy accuses Seth of trying to scam her for a free drink and he tells her to taste his drink if she does not believe him. Amy Greenwood intervenes and offers Seth a free drink, but he says it is fine and to leave it. He later makes a formal complaint to Lassiter's.
17 November	Will Attles	Charlie Mycroft	The host of an AA meeting, attended by Glen Donnelly and Terese Willis. Will asks the newcomers to introduce themselves.
18 November	Tilda	Natalie Lynch (voice)	A Lassiter's employee, who informs Terese Willis over the phone that her missing wedding ring has not been handed into reception yet.
30 November 2021, 6 January 2022, 23 February 2022	Scott Triffett	Steven Oktaras	A delivery man, who drops off a dress at Number 28 Ramsay Street. He later delivers a bottle of wine to recovering alcoholic, Terese Willis. The following month, he leaves a package for Hendrix Greyson with Zara Selwyn. The character was mistakenly credited as Corey Triffett during his final appearance.
1 December	Const. Robert Dolby	Brett Pearce	A policeman, who jokes about Levi Canning's polyamorous relationship with Amy Greenwood and Ned Willis.
2 December	Const. Reuben Elliot	Lee Jankowski	A policeman, who attends the Erinsborough Police Ball and makes sly comments about Levi Canning, Amy Greenwood and Ned Willis' polyamorous relationship. After Amy confronts him, Reuben almost gets into a fight with Ned, until Sergeant Andrew Rodwell asks him to leave the ball.
