= Kevin Hofbauer =

Australian actor

Kevin Hofbauer is an Australian stage, television and film actor known for his role as Constable Christian Tapu in the Australian police drama series Rush. He is also known for his role in Offspring. Hofauer also appeared in channel 10 drama series Playing for Keeps (TV series) Hofbauer also appeared in 2020 series Informer 3838 as Detective David Miechel. In 2023, Hofbauer appeared in ABC kids show Planet Lulin.

== Early life ==
Hofbauer graduated from Victorian College of Arts and Music (VCAM) in 2009, after attending since 2007.

He joined the ensemble of Red Stitch Actors Theatre in mid-2016.

== Filmography ==
=== Television appearances ===
Year	Title	Role	Notes	Ref
2010–2012	Rush	Constable Christian Tapu	35 episodes	
2011	Small Time Gangster	Dean	4 episodes	
2013	Mr & Mrs Murder	Brian	1 episode	
2013	Offspring	Joseph Green	11 episodes	
2014	Minimum Way	Dragon	TV Movie	
2017	Sisters	Farmyard Frank	4 episodes	
2018	True Story with Hamish and Andy	Chooka	1 episode	
2018-19	Playing for Keeps	Travis Cochrane	16 episodes	
2020	Informer 3838	David Miechel	1 episode	
2021	Neighbours	Mitch Foster	Recurring role (4 episodes)	
2021	Clickbait	Hotel Receptionist	1 episode	
2021	Spreadsheet	Hayden	1 episode	
2024	Planet Lulin (F.A.N.G)	Ken	10 episodes	
2026	Dear Life	Rick George	TV series: 4 episodes	

=== Film appearances ===
Year	Title	Role	Notes
2022	The Testosterone Club	Macka	Short
2020	The Unlit	Will James	
2015	Pedal	Craig	Short
2014	Coral	Kevin	Short
2014	Faded Mascara	Marika	
2012	Pacific Cove	Chong	Short

== Theatre ==
Year	Title	Role	Notes	Ref
2025	The Comeuppance	Ensemble	Red Stitch Actors Theatre	
2024	A Case for the Existence of God	Keith	Red Stitch Actors Theatre	
2023	Wolf Play	Ryan	Red Stitch Actors Theatre	
2022	Touching The Void	Simon	Melbourne Theatre Co	
2017	The Flick		Cremorne Theatre	
