= Episode 8851 (Neighbours) =

- Neighbours episode
- The title card for the episode, which replaced the usual opening credits.
- Episode no.: Episode 8851
- Directed by: Eugenie Muggleton and Kate Kendall
- Written by: Jason Herbison
- Original air dates: 20 May 2022 (UK); 16 June 2022 (AU)

Guest appearances
- Tim Robards as Pierce Greyson; Jane Allsop as Lisa Rowsthorn; Molly Broadstock as Alana Greyson; Beatrix Van Vliet as Maeve Rowsthorn; Patrick Gibson as Roscoe Dawson

Episode chronology
← Previous; Episode 8850	Next → Episode 8852

Episode 8851 of the Australian soap opera Neighbours premiered on 20 May 2022 in the United Kingdom and on 16 June 2022 in Australia. The episode was written by the serial's executive producer Jason Herbison and directed by Eugenie Muggleton and Kate Kendall. The plot focuses on Hendrix Greyson's (Ben Turland) trip to Sydney, where he intends to tell his family that he has been diagnosed with pulmonary fibrosis. Hendrix is accompanied by his girlfriend Mackenzie Hargreaves (Georgie Stone) and the pair tour his favourite childhood locations around the city, furthering the exploration of the character's background.

The episode is only centred around Hendrix's storyline and is set entirely in Sydney, so the usual sets and filming locations are not featured. It was filmed on-location in the city in early March 2022. Episode 8851 does not use the show's opening title sequence and none of the main cast beyond Hendrix and Mackenzie appear. Tim Robards reprises his role as Hendrix's father Pierce Greyson for the first time since 2020, after he was forced to leave the show early and the role had to be recast. Jane Allsop also reprises her role as Hendrix's mother Lisa Rowsthorn, while Molly Broadstock and Beatrix Van Vliet make their debuts as Alana Greyson and Maeve Rowsthorn respectively.

Episode 8851 was well received by Daniel Kilkelly of Digital Spy, who branded it "a triumph". He praised Turland and Stone's acting performances, as well as the script and production values. Kilkelly found that the focus on only one storyline allowed time for a number of character-based scenes and a more relaxed pace. Laura Denby from Yahoo! Entertainment believed it was one of several stunning moments for the show, which had stemmed from Hendrix's storyline. The proposal scene was included in a Radio Times poll to find the best moment from Neighbours.

== Plot ==
Hendrix and Mackenzie drive over the Sydney Harbour Bridge in a rented Ferrari California, before stopping at Mrs Macquarie's Point. There, Hendrix tells Mackenzie about the time he ran away from home because he did not like his mother's new boyfriend. He shows her the bench where he sat the day he cheated on an exam, and the spot where he did his first backflip. In Quibaree Park, Hendrix explains that is where he experienced his first heartbreak. He suddenly suffers a coughing fit and Mackenzie tells him they cannot keep his condition from his family, but Hendrix insists they can. While Mackenzie waits for Hendrix to come back from the restroom, his sister Alana shows up. She tells Hendrix that she worked out where they were from his social media posts. They have lunch with Hendrix and Alana's father, Pierce. Hendrix starts feeling ill, but blames it on an early start. Afterwards, Hendrix shows Mackenzie around his old school, but a security guard chases them out. The pair then visit Hendrix's mother Lisa and his half-sister Maeve. Hendrix gets upset wondering if he will be around to see Maeve grow up. Mackenzie assures him that he will get a transplant, but Hendrix questions whether he will get to share his life with her. Mackenzie tells him that he cannot keep his condition from his family anymore and suggests they talk to Lisa first.

When they go inside, they find Pierce and Alana have arrived and Hendrix realises that Alana has gone through his bag. Pierce asks why he has health instructions with him, while Lisa reads that he has pulmonary fibrosis. Hendrix admits the instructions are for the hospital in case he has to be admitted. He explains that he has an autoimmune disease that developed into pulmonary fibrosis after he rescued Mackenzie from a fire. Pierce asks Hendrix why he did not tell them sooner, and Hendrix says he got fed up of people treating him differently back home. He apologises for all the stupid things he has done and the time they spent being angry at each other. Lisa thanks Mackenzie for being there for Hendrix, but Alana blames her for Hendrix's condition as he went into the fire for her. Hendrix orders her to apologise, before asking his family to be strong for him. Hendrix takes Mackenzie to North Bondi, where he used to go and think about his future. He admits that she was right about talking to his family. Hendrix then tells Mackenzie that he has never met anyone like her, before declaring his love and asking her to marry him.

== Production ==
=== Development ===
On 24 April 2022, Neighbours confirmed regular character Hendrix Greyson, played by Ben Turland, would be diagnosed with sarcoidosis, an autoimmune disease. Scenes prior to this had shown Hendrix suffering serious coughing fits. Hendrix soon learns that the sarcoidosis has developed into pulmonary fibrosis and he needs a lung transplant. The storyline began airing from 5 May in the United Kingdom and 16 June in Australia. Of his reaction to learning about the plot, Turland stated "I was taken into the office and told that they wanted to do this storyline and it was going to be quite big. I was honoured to take it on, and it's been really good to explore it with everybody." He explained that Hendrix's condition developed after he saved his girlfriend Mackenzie Hargreaves (Georgie Stone) from a fire at the local high school. The storyline was then built up slowly with Hendrix eventually receiving his diagnosis. Turland called the plot "a good challenge" for him to take on. He also explained that prior to the episode, both Hendrix and Mackenzie were having "a tough time" coping with Hendrix's diagnosis.

Episode 8851 solely focuses on Hendrix's storyline, as he and Mackenzie visit his family in Sydney and tell them about his diagnosis. It was written by executive producer Jason Herbison and co-directed by Eugenie Muggleton and Kate Kendall. Unlike the majority of Neighbours episodes, it features a small cast and centres around one storyline. There are also no opening titles or scenes set in the fictional Ramsay Street and Erinsborough locations. The plot helps further exploration of the character's backstory, as Hendrix takes Mackenzie around his favourite places in Sydney, before he is reunited with his family. Turland said "We see a lot of the places where Hendrix would go to if he was scared as a little kid – places that he felt comfortable. Taking Mackenzie to all of those spots is really special. It's really nice for Hendrix to be in those places with the girl that he loves. It's so important to him and it tells us a lot about Hendrix as a character." Turland said that Hendrix has to tell his family about his condition because he will need their support going forward, but he finds it "daunting". He also believed Hendrix felt guiltily at not having seen his family in quite some time, especially his sister, and he said that it was time they reconnected.

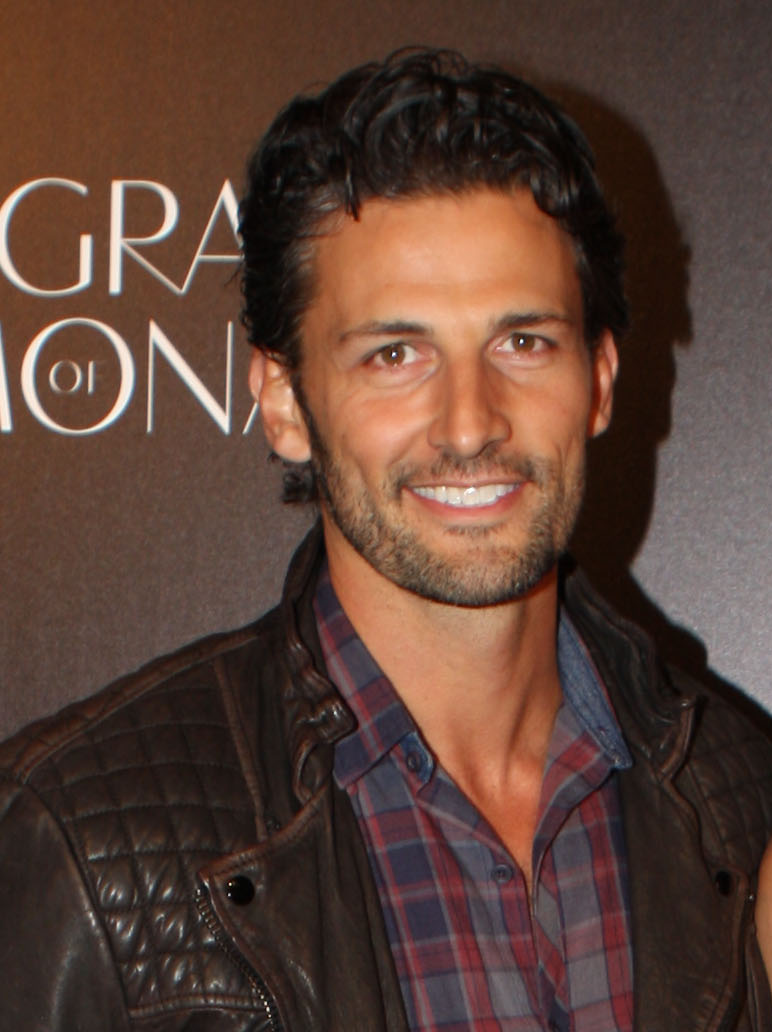
Tim Robards (pictured) reprised his role of Pierce Greyson, two years after the part had to be recast.

Turland told Alice Penwill of Inside Soap that Hendrix's family are shocked by the news, as his condition seems to have come out of nowhere, and it has been a long time since he last spoke with them. Turland called the scenes "confronting" and said that his family "need to get their heads around it", but Hendrix's parents are keen to help him. The episode ends with Hendrix proposing to Mackenzie. Turland described the proposal as "very much spur of the moment." He believed that Mackenzie had been good for Hendrix, as she makes him think differently. He also reckoned that Hendrix is questioning who and what he wants in life at that point, so it feels right for him to propose. Turland noted that as the proposal is spontaneous, Hendrix does not have a ring and Mackenzie is not expecting it at all. He added "They're young and with everything going on, it comes out of nowhere. But Hendrix knows what he wants, and he wants to get married..."

=== Filming and cast ===
The episode was filmed on-location in Sydney in early March 2022. Turland said filming the episode was a lot of fun, but described it as "a pretty tough shoot" due to bad weather. He enjoyed travelling to Sydney and shooting scenes in the different locations that mean something important to his character. He found that filming in real houses instead of sets made him and his co-stars feel like a proper family.

Producer and director Kate Kendall revealed on her social media in the same month that Tim Robards and Jane Allsop would be reprising their roles as Hendrix's parents Pierce Greyson and Lisa Rowsthorn for the episode. Robards had played Pierce from his introduction in 2018, but he was forced to leave the show early in 2020 due to COVID-19 travel restrictions in Australia. The role was then recast to Don Hany who played out the character's final storylines. Robards felt honoured to be able to return to the role, especially as it had been announced that Neighbours would be ending later that year. He stated: "I'm beyond excited and grateful to get back and see the whole team whom I never got to say goodbye to. Now knowing the show is coming to an end, it's such a privilege to be a part of it one last time." Turland was also glad to have Robards back, pointing out that he had started the show with him and they had formed a good friendship off-screen. He also noted that it was Robards' last chance to come back to the show before production wrapped, so it was a good chance for them to be able to explore Pierce and Hendrix's relationship again.

Episode 8851 also features the first appearance of Hendrix's sister Alana Greyson. Molly Broadstock was cast as Alana, who had been mentioned by her family members on-screen since Hendrix's introduction in 2019. Turland praised Broadstock and said that he had had fun exploring the relationship between their characters. He also said that viewers would finally get to see Hendrix in the big brother role, as he expresses guilt for not being there for his sister. He added "It's been really good and Molly is great. We connected and established this sibling relationship, especially as we see the two characters in their homes in Sydney." Lisa's young daughter and Hendrix's half-sister, Maeve Rowsthorn, played by Beatrix Van Vliet, is also introduced in the episode.

== Reception ==
The original broadcast of Episode 8851 was watched by 85,000 viewers in Australia, which was a small decrease from the previous day's episode, however, it still made the top 20 programmes shown on free-to-air multi channels that day.

In his review of Episode 8851, Daniel Kilkelly of Digital Spy branded it "a triumph". He praised Turland and Stone's performances and Herbison's script, calling it "an incredible episode that earned a place in the show's history books." Kilkelly was glad to see Turland at the forefront of a big storyline, and believed that the story needed "the extra effort" involved. With the focus on one plot, Kilkelly explained that there was time for "character-based scenes, exploration of backstory and a slower pace". Kilkelly also enjoyed the on-location filming and production values. He concluded that Episode 8851 showed Neighbours was still on form and able to deliver strong moments in its final few months on air.

Stephen Patterson from British newspaper Metro noted that Pierce was "incredibly supportive" of his son and said their moment together was "emotional". Patterson called the scenes in which Hendrix proposes to Mackenzie "romantic", adding "No, you're crying." Yahoo! Entertainment's Laura Denby praised the pairing of Hendrix and Mackenzie as they navigated his pulmonary fibrosis story, writing "Hendrix's illness has sparked some stunning moments for the soap, as the character whisked Mackenzie away to Sydney where he took her to his favourite childhood haunts. He acknowledged just how lucky he felt to have her in his life, and surprised her with a marriage proposal." The proposal between Hendrix and Mackenzie was included in a Radio Times poll to find "the best Neighbours moment in the show's history."
