= Dipi Rebecchi =

Fictional character from Neighbours

- Neighbours character
- Portrayed by: Sharon Johal
- Duration: 2017–2021
- First appearance: 24 April 2017
- Last appearance: 13 July 2021
- Introduced by: Jason Herbison
- Spin-off appearances: Neighbours vs Time Travel (2017); Neighbours: Erinsborough High (2019)
In-universe information
- Occupation: Waitress and owner of Harold's Café
- Sisters: Mishti Sharma
- Husband: Shane Rebecchi
- Sons: Jay Rebecchi
- Daughters: Yashvi Rebecchi; Kirsha Rebecchi

Dipika "Dipi" Rebecchi is a fictional character from the Australian soap opera Neighbours, played by Sharon Johal. She made her first appearance during the episode broadcast on 24 April 2017. Johal originally auditioned for the role of Dipi's younger sister Mishti Sharma (Scarlet Vas). Actress Scarlett Vas secured the role and producers changed Dipi to better suit Johal. Dipi is part of the extended Rebecchi family introduced into Neighbours, joining established regular character Toadfish Rebecchi (Ryan Moloney). She is married to Shane Rebecchi (Nicholas Coghlan) and they move to Erinsborough with their two daughters Yashvi (Olivia Junkeer) and Kirsha Rebecchi (Vani Dhir). She soon becomes the new owner of Harold's café.

Dipi is characterised as very social and extroverted. She has a passion for musical theatre which is often explored in her stories. She is portrayed as a proud mother and wife, but her overbearing ways uncover anger issues as she gets into violent altercations with three characters. She also establishes herself as a local gossip alongside Sheila Canning (Colette Mann). Dipi is older than Johal so the show's styling team have to make her appear an older mother by dressing her in baggy caftans and altering Johal's glamorous hair style. Her stories have included an assault on Jake Hendra (Guy Greenstone), a near death experience, her turbulent marriage to Shane and constant interference in Mishti's life. In March 2021, Johal announced her departure from the show and she made her final appearance in July 2021. Critics of the genre have praised Neighbours for adding multicultural diversity in hiring Johal, an Indian-Australian actress.

== Casting ==
The character and casting details were announced on 27 March. Johal originally auditioned for the role of Dipi's sister Mishti Sharma, but the character's age was lowered and Scarlet Vas was cast instead. The producers of Neighbours liked Johal, so they decided to change Dipi to make her work better for the actress.

When Johal auditioned for the role she had long been trying to gain an ongoing role. She was working as a lawyer and in 2016 contemplated giving acting up to concentrate on her second career option. Producers called the actress back for the audition process for Dipi. The actress recalled there being almost 50 actors present wanting to play Shane. She auditioned with actors either shorter or older than herself which left her feeling that none would be a good match and lessened her chance of being cast together. Johal had not read for the part with Nicholas Coghlan at the first audition but casting directors would later put them together. Johal stated that the casting team had a clear vision for Dipi and Shane and thought they would work well together. When her agent informed Johal she had won the role she was at work in the law office. She was left speechless and felt a "massive sense of relief".

== Development ==
=== Characterisation ===
==== Personality ====
"The thing I love about her is she's a great role model for women. She's unapologetic in the way she feels and what she believes in. Everything she does, she owns."

— Johal discussing Dipi being a role model. (2019)

The characters official biography on Tenplay describes her as "a ray of sunshine to those around her". She is very social and is "highly extroverted". She is determined to see the good in people and is family oriented. She is a proud mother of three children and wife to Shane. Dipi is also "enthusiastic and bubbly, with an infectious lust for life". She counts Indian astrology, Ayurveda medicine and cooking as her main hobbies.

The character is delighted to reside in Erinsborough after moving from Bourke. She also relishes the challenge to manage her own café. Shane and Dipi met during a theatre production of Grease. Shane was the stage manager and built the sets. The couple make references to it on-screen. Dipi is good friends with Shane's mother Angie Rebecchi (Lesley Baker). A writer from Tenplay noted that "Dipi must be really something" because Angie does not usually get along with her son's partners.

Johal felt she was not similar to Dipi because she had no experience as a mother and wife. The much younger Johal found it quite "a transition" coming in and playing a mother whose entire life revolves around her family. Johal did initially feel that most of her character's stories were just reacting to her family's dramas. She told the show's publicity team that "my role is just to keep my family together and just protect them at any cost." However, the actress wanted the character to have "a lot of layers in terms of her dreams and her career ambitions." She added that the Neighbours writers were supportive of her wishes and developed her passion for theatre. When asked about Dipi's persona Johal stated "Dipi is kind of loud, vibrant, she has got a lot of personality and she is obsessed with broadway." Each member of the Rebecci family has a nickname of a fish. She concluded that the previously mentioned character traits meant that "starfish" would be a good nickname for Dipi, especially because "she likes to see herself as a bit of a star."

Dipi's main hobby is soon established as her passion for musical theatre. Johal said that viewers had "probably noticed that Dipi is obsessed with musicals and we have a lot of different references all throughout the show." Prior to moving to Erinsborough, Dipi put on a stage show starring her entire family. At the time Johal said that writers would create a similar story for Dipi again.

Dipi establishes herself as a local gossip when she befriends Susan Kennedy (Jackie Woodburne) and Sheila Canning (Colette Mann). Johal said that her character is "pretty nosey" and that working at Harold's cafe sources the gossip. She defended her character because she believed Dipi only gossips when she is acting "in the best interests of the person". Johal described the remainder of the gossip gang as the "wise wonderful woman" Susan and "the gossip queen" Sheila - adding that the latter is the worst culprit.

==== Style ====
Many departments on the show have worked together to create Dipi's style and appearance. The production team wanted the character to look older than Johal is. When the actress arrived on-set she was informed that a hair cut was needed to better suit the character. The actress had waist length hair and they asked her permission to cut it to shoulder length. They felt that the new style would make Dipi look less glamorous and more like a mother. They also wanted to differentiate her look to her younger sister Mishti, who had longer hair. She also has to have her hair blow dried each day to create the Dipi look. Johal believed that this has damaged the condition of her hair. Similar make up is applied daily to provide the show with continuity and Dipi wears dark shades of lipstick.

Fashion wise Dipi wears a lot of caftan dresses and baggy clothes. Johal said that Dipi's wardrobe features many "earth mother clothes" that she thought were "a bit frumpy" for her physique. She describes herself as curvy and likes to wear tight dresses to show her figure, but noted that is not allowed as it clashes with Dipi's style.

=== Introduction ===
Dipi is part of the extended Rebecchi family who arrive in Erinsborough to live on Ramsay Street. Dipi is the wife of Shane Rebecchi (Nicholas Coghlan), the older brother of established regular Toadfish Rebecchi (Ryan Moloney), who returns to Erinsborough with his family after 22 years. Dipi and Shane move to the street with their two daughters Yashvi (Olivia Junkeer) and Kirsha Rebecchi (Vani Dhir). They also have one son, Jay, who does not move to Erinsborough with them. Dipi made her first appearance during the episode broadcast on 24 April 2017. Johal found it easy to work with her new on-screen family. She told Anna Vlach from news.com.au that "it's just like a family and I really connected with them straight away."

Dipi's sister Mishti also joins them and is shown to have mysterious secret she is keeping from the family. Johal told the show's publicity team that "there is something shady happening. They are not forthright with Dipi, which is hurtful for Dipi." Viewers assumed an intimate affair had taken but the actress said that "it might not be what you think. Always expect the unexpected."

=== Marital struggles ===
When the actress first began filming she needed to demonstrate that Dipi and Shane had "big long strong history" together. She was nervous because she did not know Coghlan too well. Johal was particularly nervous when she and Coghlan filmed Dipi and Shane's first kissing scene in Harold's cafe. It was awkward when they looked into each others eyes and kissed. She pointed out that watching the scene back you can see Dipi's lips sweating. Another was an intimate pool scene the couple share during an evening alone together. Johal said that she took the "Fake it till you make it" approach to their relationship and was eventually confident in portraying their relationship.

Johal believed that her character was totally committed to Shane and would never have an affair. She told the Neighbours publicity team that Dipi "only got eyes for him". She could not fathom anyone tempting Dipi away from "the beautiful man that is Shane". She explained that Dipi views him as her "husband that wears his flannelette shirts, who makes all these genius inventions that do not work out, but is such a good bloke." She added that she hoped the show's writers never split them up over infidelity.

Mishti rejoins the police force but falls out with Dipi over Shane. When Shane gets drunk, he takes his anger out on Gary Canning (Damien Richardson). They argue on Ramsay Street and Shane gets violent and throws his neighbour's rubbish bins around. Mishti is forced to arrest Shane to prevent any further escalation. Vas told an Inside Soap reporter that "Dipi is left fuming - she feels that Mishti should have gone easy on Shane." But Vas felt that her character was just and it was a moment she needed to put being an officer over being a good sister.

Dipi later causes more problems in her marriage when her aggressive side gets out of control. Dipi and Shane go to Yashvi's football match which is being watched by a talent scout. Shane wants Dipi to remain calm and not make their daughter nervous during the game. Dipi ignores Shane's wishes and embarrasses Yashvi. When Dipi witnesses fellow spectator Jake Hendra (Guy Greenstone) mocking Yashvi's performance she reacts violently and punches him in the face. This causes Yashvi to lose the match and Dipi's family turn against her.

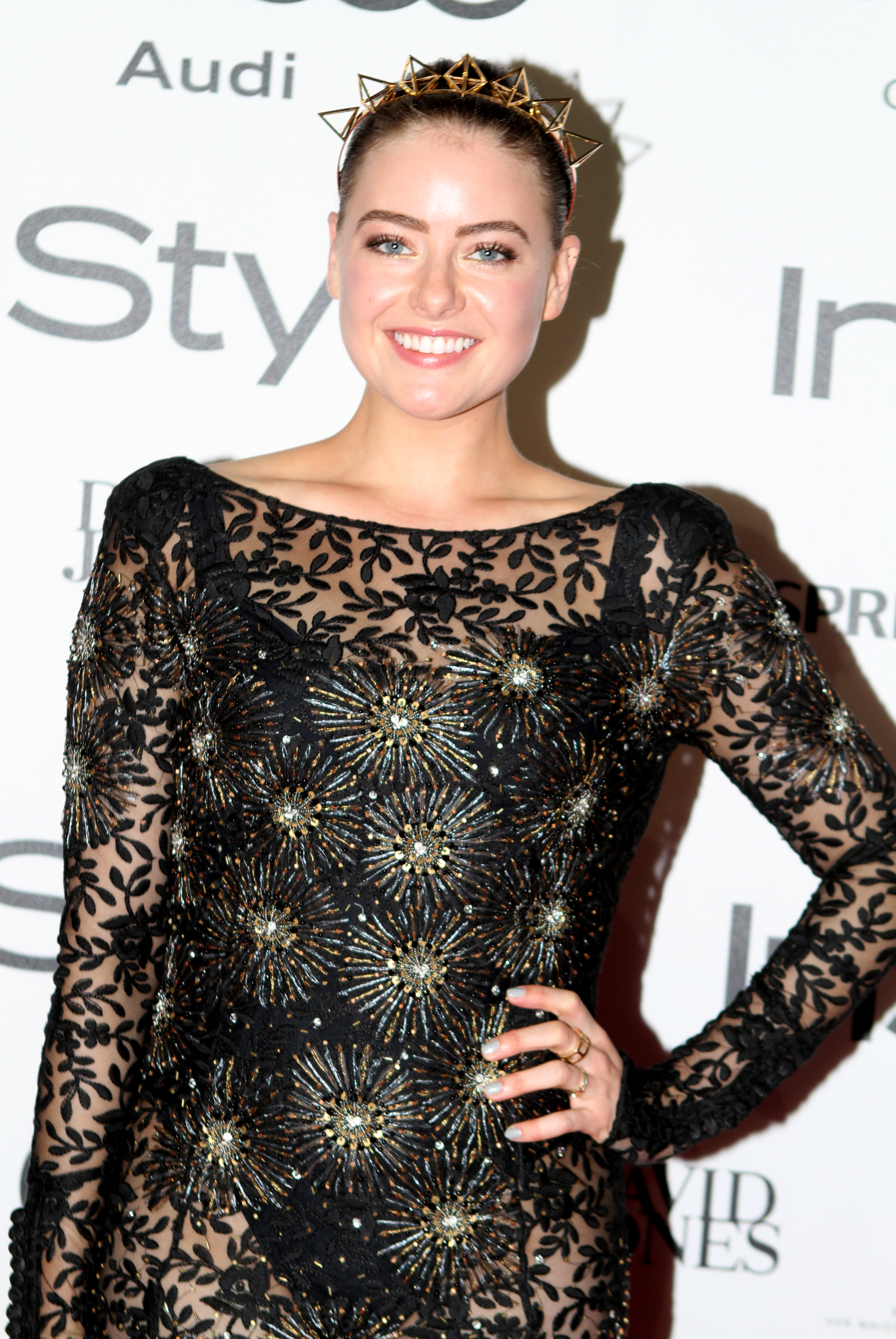
Dipi accuses Shane of having an affair with Chloe Brennan, played by April Rose Pengilly (pictured).

When Chloe Brennan (April Rose Pengilly) starts a paid-escort service, Shane meets up with her to talk about his marriage troubles. When Chloe's boss Paul Robinson (Stefan Dennis) discovers her side business he gets revenge by telling Dipi that Shane has used Chloe's service. Dipi incorrectly assumes that Shane has been paying Chloe for sex. She is outraged and confronts Chloe on Ramsay Street. Their argument escalates and Chloe falls into a pile of rubbish. Pengilly told Johnathon Hughes of the Radio Times that Shane just wants information about her business associate and Chloe wants to help Shane. She added that it is a story where the "wires are definitely crossed" when Dipi assumes the worst.

The scene was originally supposed to feature Dipi becoming violent with Chloe, grabbing her neck choker and pushing her into the trash. Johal was unhappy with the scene and did not like the dialogue used. She thought that Dipi would not want to shame another woman for her lifestyle choices. She also wanted to demonstrate that her character had learned to overcome violence following her physical altercation with Jake. The scene instead played out with Chloe falling into the rubbish, while Johal added in a line about her husband being dishonest to demonstrate it is not always the woman's fault. Pengilly also approved the scene change and wrote on her Instagram stating "we both went to great lengths to change this scene, it was written as a classic cat fight, in which Chloe was basically slut-shamed."

=== Estranging Mishti ===
During their time on-screen together, Dipi constantly interferes in Mishti's personal life. Firstly she does not approve of Mishti's boyfriend Leo Tanaka (Tim Kano). Mishti constantly plays the role of peacemaker between Dipi and Leo as tries to repair their rift. She argues Leo's point of view but Dipi remains unconvinced. Dipi believes that Leo has ill-advised Shane over a business deal to secure backing for his urine powered generator. She accuses him of plotting to secure a free generator from Shane. At a family barbecue Dipi continues to bicker with Leo. Johal told a reporter from Inside Soap that her character is not willing to solve her differences with Leo, stating "when Leo confronts Dipi about her behaviour, she tries to avoid the conversation." The argument escalates and the pair fall into the Rebecchi's swimming pool. Johal and Kano enjoyed the opportunity to film the comedic scenes. Dipi redeems herself when Mishti learns she is pregnant with Leo's baby. Dipi offers her advice to Mishti, which she responds well to. Vas told Sally Brockway from Soaplife that "Dipi reckons she'll be a great mum and Mishti really appreciates her advice. Dipi's support makes Mishti feel like she can do it."

Writers created another a rift between Dipi and Mishti with her interfering in Mishti's relationship with Pavan Nahal (Akkshey Caplash). When Mishti joins an arranged marriage website Dipi is furious. She thinks that arranged marriage is outdated and cannot understand Mishti's actions. She tries to convince Dipi to support her. Mishti finds her potential husband Pavan and they begin to date. Mishti tries to win Dipi's support by arranging a family meal. Dipi tries but decides that Pavan is unsuitable and hatches a plan to sabotage their relationship. Dipi's plans backfire and Mishti thinks Pavan will be the perfect husband.

When the Rebecchis meet Pavan's disapproving mother, Menna Nahal (Mala Singh-Narayan), Dipi decides to interfere and talk to her. Menna does not respond well to Dipi's words and leaves. When Pavan calls off their engagement, Mishti blames Dipi and accuses her of sabotaging her relationship. Mishti incorrectly assumes that Dipi informed Pavan about her involvement in a sex tape. Dipi promises Mishti she is not to blame and decides to meddle yet again and contact Pavan to discover how he found out. Dipi eventually convinces Pavan to reconcile with Mishti. He receives a job offer in Sydney and Mishti agrees to move away with him. As she leaves she forgives Dipi and thanks her for the support she gave during her many relationship dramas.

=== New Year's Eve attack ===
Writers planned a story for Dipi which saw her fall victim to a violent attack during the show's New Year's Eve episode. Susannah Alexander of Digital Spy reported it as a "dramatic" plot which would see the character's "life hang in the balance". The story begins with Dipi carrying out tarot card readings and the results lead her to believe that someone close to her will die. The attack occurs when Gary believes that Kev McNally (Troy Davis) has planted stolen goods in the coffee hut to frame him. Gary sets out to catch Kev but loses him. Dipi passes by during the night and Gary mistakenly assumes she is Kev and lunges at her. Dipi is knocked unconscious and is rushed to hospital. The show had been teasing their audience with news that they planned to kill off a regular character in 2019. Dipi's attack coincided with this but it was soon revealed that her sister-in-law Sonya Rebecchi (Eve Morey) would be the death victim.

Following her release from hospital, Gary tries to make amends by baking desserts for Dipi. They bond over their shared love of baking and he gives her a recipe book as a gift. Shane reacts violently to Gary being in his home and throws him out into the street. He tries to attack Gary further but Amy Williams (Zoe Cramond) intervenes to stop Shane. Some viewers believed that the show's writers were planning an affair plot for Dipi and Gary. Johal denied this via her Twitter account, stating they were not well matched.

=== Affair with Pierce Greyson ===
In September 2020, producers established an affair storyline between Dipi and Pierce Greyson (Tim Robards; Don Hany). As Shane endures through a drug addiciton relapse, his and Dipi's marriage is strained. Concurrently, Pierce and Chloe Brennan's marriage is strained as she suffers a miscarriage and develops romantic feelings for Nicolette Stone (Charlotte Chimes). As Dipi and Pierce's respective marriages "deteriorate", the pair confide within a Lassiters room and kiss. Due to the COVID-19 pandemic, Johal's real husband, Ankur Johal, was brought in for the kiss scene. Johal teased this on Instagram, with a post that featured herself, Ankur and Robards in the Lassiters room simultaneously. She captioned, "Um. WHAT IN THE WORLD is going on here?!" Ankur told the Herald Sun, "My wife made me practice 'pretend kissing' the night before, which is such a weird concept. I thought my kissing skills were up to scratch but obviously not." He revealed that Sharon Johal was enjoying the storyline and "her pride in her work requires her to tell the story and perform to the best of her ability however she can, (and) on this occasion that included having me to help in those pivotal scenes." Sharon Johal said later in an Instagram post with intimate pictures between her and Robard's characters, "If the pandemic didn't happen, it's likely you would've seen more of this vibe, and I often wonder how the story would've played out if we were in fact, able to touch, but these were the cards we were dealt with this year. As difficult as it was, I think we did a great job given the circumstances if I do say so myself."

The storyline occurs during an actor changeover for Pierce, as Don Hany takes over the role from Tim Robards. Johal explained, "I had to be intimate with four men over the course of this storyline – my on-screen husband Shane, Pierce played by Tim Robards, Pierce played by Don Hany and my real-life husband." Additionally, she joked, "There were definitely three men too many for me." After the first scenes of the affair aired, Johal released a behind-the-scenes Instagram post, where she revealed that the storyline had been planned for over a year and explained that the producers' initial affair pitch "shocked" her. She added, "Up until that point, I had literally only had one or two conversations with [Pierce] and couldn't see the connection." The actress also thanked the Neighbours crew for erecting the "unlikely story." Dipi further pushes herself towards Pierce when Shane almost tampers with police evidence. Despite attempts to "salvage their marriages", the couple's affair continues until the end of the month. Paul Robinson soon discovers the affair and blackmails the pair into selling their shares of the hotel. However, the affair is exposed when Nicolette tells the public. The exposure comes as Shane and Dipi's son, Jay Rebecchi (Dhruv Malge), is introduced to the serial, whose introduction Johal had previously advocated for.

Whilst Chloe files for divorce, Shane separates from Dipi and writers established a love triangle storyline, as Shane begins dating Amy Greenwood (Jacinta Stapleton), just before Dipi opens up to the idea of reconciliation. Stapleton told Daniel Kilkelly of Digital Spy, "Amy actually asks Shane about Dipi and he tells her that it's okay. You can only believe the information that someone tells you. Shane is pretty confident that him and Dipi are over, so I think Amy just goes for it because that's the information she's been told." Dipi is left "heartbroken", but is brought closer to Shane when he is injured in an explosion at 28 Ramsay Street. When a lip-sync battle in The Waterhole pairs Dipi and Amy together, a fight between them occurs on stage, where they "exchange jabs before their clash turns physical right in front of the cameras." Shane then gives his support to Amy. A "life-or-death situation" was then written by storyliners, which sees Amy accidentally leave a gas valve turned on at The 82. The gas leaves Dipi and Amy unconscious on the floor and forces Shane to choose who to save. Nicholas Coghlan, who plays Shane, said in an interview, "The life-and-death situation gives rise to an unguarded moment and Shane finally realises it's Dipi he truly loves. She's the centre of his life, his family, and his world." Dipi and Shane reunite.

=== Departure and return ===
On 2 March 2021, Johal announced her departure from the show. She confirmed that she had decided to leave in 2020, saying "When I made this decision it was pre-pandemic and I had to revisit my decision again. Then I decided to not make a decision based on fear, just to put myself out there and take a big risk for potentially a big reward." Johal had been shadowing one of the show's directors in order to learn how to produce and create her own content, as well as directing and writing scripts for the show. In a social media post, she also cited the long working hours and exhaustion as reasons for her departure. She stated "I have learnt and grown so much in this time technically, professionally but also mentally as this job is rewarding yet challenging in so many ways." Dipi's exit storyline sees her move to Sydney with Shane for a fresh start, following her affair with Pierce. Although Johal's final scenes aired at the end of the month, executive producer Jason Herbison confirmed that she would make a guest appearance later in the year. The character's return aired on 30 June 2021. Dipi returns to Erinsborough after learning Yashvi is in hospital following a car crash. While there, she also hopes Yashvi will reconcile with her former boyfriend Ned Willis (Ben Hall), but at the end of the episode, Dipi sees Ned kissing Amy. Dipi departed with Yashvi a little while after her return.

== Reception ==
Maddison Hockey from TV Week said that "Sharon Johal is breaking down barriers on Australian TV" by playing the role of Dipi, while journalist Joe Scrimshire noted that Dipi and her family as examples of how Australian television casts were gaining more diversity.

Anna Vlach from news.com.au wrote that Johal made "history as the first Punjabi Sikh actor on national television in a mainstream show." Kelsey Munro and Sarah Abo from SBS Australia also made note of the show's change in diversity values, stating "Rebecchi is one half of an interracial couple with two kids. While that might sound unremarkable in real life, the once exclusively Anglo-Celtic soap has been slow to reflect Australia's multicultural diversity."

Aneeta Menon from Indian Link Australia said that Indian families had been a part of Australian society for decades and that with Dipi and her family joining Neighbours, television was finally beginning to reflect the real diverse society.
