= Olivia Junkeer =

Australian actress (born 1999)

- Born: 11 January 1999 (age 27); Melbourne, Victoria, Australia
- Education: Methodist Ladies College
- Occupation: Actress
- Years active: 2016–present

Olivia Junkeer (born 11 January 1999) is an Australian actress, best known for her role as Yashvi Rebecchi in the Australian soap opera Neighbours. She also portrayed the character in the spin-off Erinsborough High. She portrayed Mia in the ABC comedy series Why Are You Like This.

== Early life and education ==
Olivia Junkeer was born on 11 January 1999 in Melbourne, Victoria. Her father is originally from Sri Lanka and her mother is an Australian of European descent. She grew up in Melbourne’s eastern suburbs and attended Methodist Ladies’ College in Kew. Junkeer was interested in acting from a young age, and throughout her teenage years went to theatre schools in Melbourne.

== Career ==
Junkeer made her television debut in 2017, on the Australian television soap opera Neighbours. She portrayed Yashvi Rebecchi, the oldest child of characters Shane Rebecchi and Dipi Rebecchi. Junkeer left Neighbours in 2021, however she reprised the role in the series' finale in 2022.

Junkeer plays Mia in the ABC comedy series Why Are You Like This.

In March 2023, Junkeer joined the cast of Binge drama series Strife, which was inspired by Mia Freedman's memoir.

== Filmography ==
=== Film ===
| Year | Title | Role | Notes |
|---|---|---|---|
| 2019 | Shadow Animals | Unnamed role | Short film |

=== Television ===
| Year | Title | Role | Notes |
|---|---|---|---|
| 2017–2022; 2023 | Neighbours | Yashvi Rebecchi | Main cast |
| 2018–2021 | Why Are You Like This | Mia | Main cast |
| 2019 | Erinsborough High | Yashvi Rebecchi | Main cast |
| 2023–present | Strife | Jeet | Main cast |
