= Hendrix Greyson =

- Neighbours character
- Portrayed by: Ben Turland
- Duration: 2019–2022
- First appearance: 13 September 2019
- Last appearance: 28 July 2022
- Introduced by: Jason Herbison
- Spin-off appearances: Erinsborough High (2019)
In-universe information
- Occupation: Student; Waiter and chef
- Father: Pierce Greyson
- Mother: Lisa Rowsthorn
- Stepmother: Chloe Brennan
- Sisters: Alana Greyson
- Half-sisters: Maeve Rowsthorn
- Wife: Mackenzie Hargreaves (2022)

Hendrix Greyson is a fictional character from the Australian television soap opera Neighbours, played by Ben Turland. Turland's manager did not tell him that he was not what the producers were looking for when he submitted a self-tape. However, he received an audition a week later and was flown to Melbourne from Sydney for a chemistry read with members of the cast. Three days later, he was informed that he had been cast as Hendrix. He joined the main cast in his first ongoing television role. He made his first appearance during the episode broadcast on 13 September 2019. Hendrix was introduced as the estranged son of Pierce Greyson (Tim Robards). His arrival led to further exploration of Pierce's backstory and established a new family unit in the serial.

The character was initially portrayed as an entitled, confident, 17 year old with a bad attitude. Turland enjoyed playing Hendrix bratty side, but tried to make him lovable and likeable. Hendrix's bad behaviour is linked to the hurt caused by his father's absence in his life. Hendrix eventually starts to grow up and is seen owning his mistakes. He also drops the "rich kid" act and is more open with his kind hearted and vulnerable sides. The character's early storylines often explored his bad behaviour and the poor relationship he has with his father. He makes romantic advances towards Pierce's partner Chloe Brennan's (April Rose Pengilly) and crashes his car, which endangers Harlow Robinson (Jemma Donovan). Pierce and Chloe's engagement causes Hendrix to feel left out and Turland explained he just wants his father to himself, but he is also struggling with his feelings for Chloe, whom he later kisses. The embarrassment leads Hendrix to move out and try to flee town on the day of the wedding. Producers later introduced the character's mother Lisa Rowsthorn (Jane Allsop), which continued exploration of the Greyson family's backstory and sees Hendrix reach a turning point in which he goes from brat to adult.

Writers explored the chemistry between Hendrix and Harlow throughout early 2020. Both Turland and Donovan thought they made a good couple. Hendrix often played a supportive role to Harlow, as she dealt with various issues related to her mother. Their relationship is also tested by Harlow's grandfather Paul Robinson (Stefan Dennis), who dislikes Hendrix. The character was given his first major solo storyline in early 2021, as he becomes involved in gambling. As the story progresses, Hendrix gets into debt to local criminal Kane Jones (Barry Conrad) and he acquires a gun for protection. Writers used the plot to break up Hendrix and Harlow, which Turland admitted to being "quite upset" about. Hendrix then experiences a downward spiral. The character next love interest was Mackenzie Hargreaves (Georgie Stone), with whom he had shared the show's first transgender kiss. The pair establish a romantic relationship after forming a close friendship, which Stone described as "a safe place". She found that Hendrix brought out a more playful side to her character. The relationship comes under strain when Hendrix befriends teenager Zara Selwyn (Freya Van Dyke), who later kisses him.

Turland decided to leave Neighbours to try new roles and pursue work overseas shortly before the serial was cancelled in early 2022. Producers decided to kill Hendrix off, which came as a shock to Turland until the story was explained to him and he realised that his character would come full circle with his family. Hendrix is diagnosed with pulmonary fibrosis as a result of saving Mackenzie from a fire. The pair took centre stage in a special episode focussing on the storyline, which sees Hendrix spontaneously propose to Mackenzie. Shortly after the wedding, Hendrix undergoes a lung transplant, but his body rejects the new lungs and he dies surrounded by his loved ones. Turland made a brief appearance as Hendrix in the show's finale on 28 July 2022. Hendrix also appears in the first Neighbours spin-off Erinsborough High (2019). The character received an early negative reaction from fans due to his questionable actions and behaviour, particularly towards women. For his portrayal of Hendrix, Turland was nominated for Best Daytime Star at the 2022 Inside Soap Awards.

== Casting ==
On 1 September 2019, Daniel Kilkelly of Digital Spy reported that Neighbours would be introducing Pierce Greyson's (Tim Robards) teenage son, Hendrix to the regular cast. Benny Turland was 20 when he was cast as a teenage Hendrix. Neighbours marks his first ongoing role, following a guest appearance on fellow Australian soap Home and Away. Turland sent in a self-tape, unaware that he was not what the producers were looking for. He explained "My manager didn't tell me this and had me put down a tape for the show." A week after sending in the tape, Turland was asked to audition and was flown to Melbourne from Sydney for a chemistry read with Robards and Jemma Donovan (Harlow Robinson). Around three days later, he was informed that he had the role. Turland stated that he had watched Neighbours since he was young and was finding it "surreal" appearing alongside the show's iconic actors. Turland made his first appearance as Hendrix on 13 September 2019.

== Development ==
=== Characterisation ===
Hendrix is 17 years old upon his introduction. His character profile on the show's official website states that he is in possession of "an impressive ego and a chip on his shoulder to match." He is initially portrayed as entitled and disrespectful towards others. He has a "bad attitude" and a confidence that leads him to think he is a "ladies-man." Turland enjoyed playing Hendrix's bad side. When Matthew Myers of DNA called Hendrix "a rich spoiled brat", Turland replied "I mean, who doesn't love playing a brat and getting away with it? I have so much fun with the role because when you're a kid you want to play up, but you'll always get punished, and now I can do whatever I want!" Turland later explained that while he wanted to play Hendrix as "an annoying little rich kid", he also wanted him to be "lovable and also likable." Hendrix's behaviour is linked to the hurt caused by Pierce's absence in his life and his belief that Pierce chose his business over being there for his family. Hendrix craves his father's "love and attention". Turland admitted that his character entered the serial with "a massive bang", leading to a negative fan reaction. He thought it was understandable because of Hendrix's questionable actions and behaviour.

Turland stated that Hendrix would start to show some growth throughout the episodes and would begin to own up to his mistakes, which he said was "really nice and responsible of him." He pointed out the character's bad attitude towards women as an example of this, explaining that some of things he had done were "inappropriate", but he now knows that and begins to learn from his mistakes. Turland partly blamed the lack of "a father figure" in Hendrix's life while he was growing up as the cause of his behaviour, adding "Hendrix has been quite spoiled and he lashes out to get attention. In some ways that can be quite disrespectful to other people, but he's really growing, which I'm happy about." Turland said that his character would do "a complete one eighty" throughout 2020 and would start to grow up a bit. He drops the rich kid act and viewers begin to see more of his "kind hearted and vulnerable" sides. He later said that he and Hendrix shared very few similarities, but thought they were similar with their connections and emotions. He thought Hendrix usually reacts straight away and does not think his actions through, while Turland hoped that he was better at decision making.

=== Introduction and early storylines ===
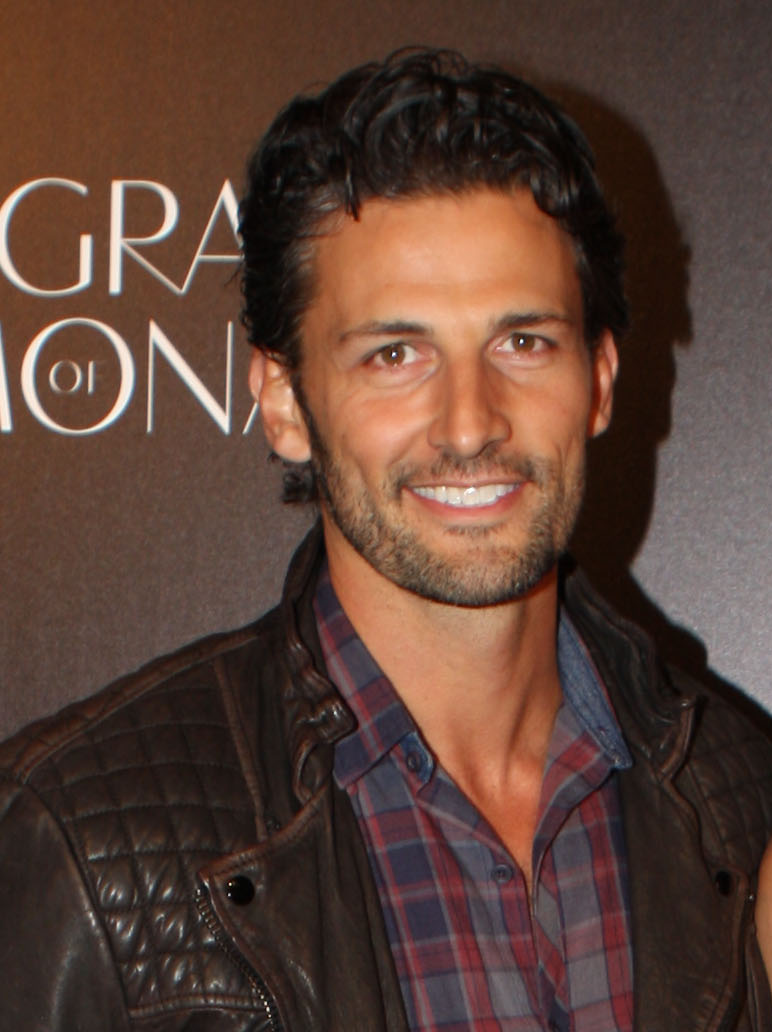
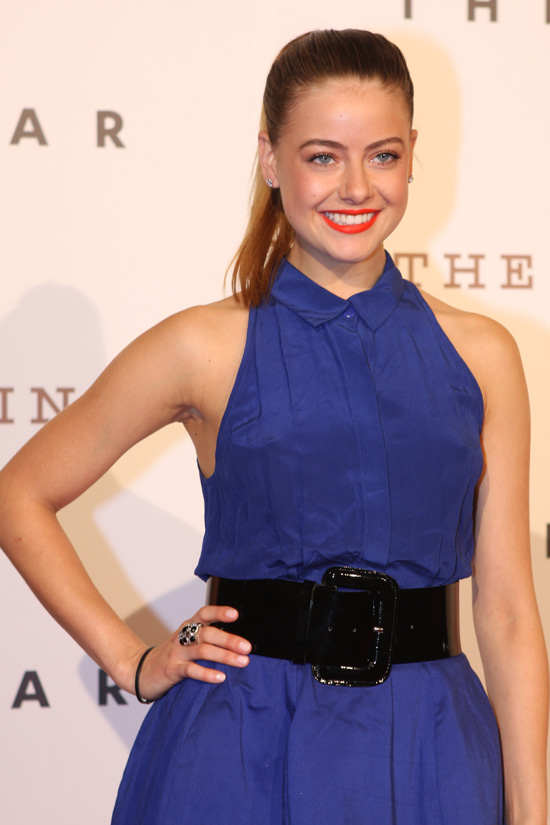
Hendrix's introduction helped establish a new family unit with Pierce Greyson, played by Tim Robards (left), and Chloe Brennan, played by April Rose Pengilly (right).

Hendrix's introduction helped further exploration of Pierce's fictional backstory and established a new family unit in the show. Hendrix comes to Erinsborough to visit his father, having just been expelled from his boarding school. His arrival coincides with Pierce and Chloe Brennan's (April Rose Pengilly) reconciliation. Both Chloe and the show's viewers were unaware that Pierce had children. Pierce explains his history with Hendrix's mother and how he has had little involvement in Hendrix or his sister's upbringing, which leads him to struggle with his resentful son. Turland enjoyed working with Robards and found that they had a lot in common, which helped them build a good rapport with one another on-screen. Hendrix also makes a subtle romantic advance towards Chloe. A couple of weeks later, he openly flirts with Mackenzie Hargreaves (Georgie Stone) at a party, which causes her to wonder whether she should tell him that she is transgender. Mackenzie briefly leaves the party to seek advice, and when she returns she "tentatively" opens up to Hendrix, whereupon he calls her "the hottest girl at the party" and kisses her. This marked the first transgender kiss on the show. Turland said that he was asked whether he would be okay with it beforehand and he replied that it was "a privilege and an honour!"

The character's early storylines often explored his rebellious side and the poor relationship he has with his father. One such storyline sees Hendrix crash a car and threatened with prison. It begins when Pierce promises Hendrix that he will inherit his business in the future in a bid to get him "on the straight and narrow". Hendrix is grateful that Pierce trusts him and he takes on board his father's advice, until he loses Pierce's attention to Chloe. Kilkelly reported that the moment makes Hendrix think that he will always come second in Pierce's life, so he steals his car and goes for a joyride. However, he soon loses control of the car and crashes into a marquee at Lassiters, trapping Harlow Robinson (Jemma Donovan) inside. Once she is freed, Pierce confronts his son and Hendrix "brushes off the crash with his usual bad boy nonchalance", causing Pierce to make a threat about reporting him to the police. Hendrix realises that he could go to prison, but Pierce soon tells everyone that he is responsible as he asked Hendrix to park his car. This leads to "a heartfelt apology" from Hendrix and a better relationship between father and son.

Hendrix reacts badly when Pierce and Chloe's get engaged and decide to move in together. Of his character's reaction, Turland told Kilkelly: "Pierce's proposal was pretty surprising to Hendrix, because he had no idea about it. It felt like he was in the dark and he feels left out, which is quite hard to deal with. Hendrix wants his dad to himself and he's also into Chloe. It'd be tough to be at a wedding where he wants both people for himself! Accepting that they're going to get married will be quite a big thing for him to get over." Hendrix also learns Chloe has Huntington's disease, which Turland said comes as "a huge shock" to him. Turland told Kilkelly that the news causes Hendrix to become embarrassed about his actions, and it forces him to "look at himself" and the way he has been approaching things. Turland thought it was a big step for the relationship between Hendrix and Chloe, saying "He grows up and realises you never know what's going on in people's lives, so you can't treat people the way he has been doing."

Hendrix's crush on Chloe comes to a head when he kisses her during a wedding rehearsal, leaving her "understandably shocked" by the move. Pierce is also "left reeling" when he realises Hendrix was not joking around and that he really does have feelings for Chloe. Hendrix is so embarrassed that he moves in with Karl Kennedy (Alan Fletcher) and Susan Kennedy (Jackie Woodburne). On the day of the wedding, Hendrix attempts to run away from Erinsborough by booking a flight to Sydney with Pierce's credit card. Pengilly sympathised with him, as her character had been in a similar situation. She commented "It's too much for him to handle." Pierce goes after his son, telling Chloe that he cannot be without him. Pengilly told Sarah Ellis of Inside Soap that the wedding is put on hold until Pierce returns with Hendrix, and that Chloe "knows it won't be right if Hendrix isn't there. She's really frustrated that he chose to run away on this very important day – however, she does understand where he's coming from." Hendrix initially refuses to return with his father because he cannot understand why Pierce wants him there. The bad history between the pair surfaces, as Hendrix tells his father to start a new family with Chloe, but Pierce refuses to go ahead with the wedding without him. The pair eventually reconcile and Pierce and Chloe marry.

The introduction of Hendrix's mother Lisa Rowsthorn (Jane Allsop) in early 2020 led to continued exploration of the Greyson family's backstory. Her arrival also occurs as the relationship between Hendrix and Pierce is at an all time low, with Karl having told Pierce and Chloe that Hendrix wants to stay with him and Susan. While Pierce is expressing his regret at not being there for Hendrix when he was younger, he admits to Chloe that he was essentially a sperm donor for Lisa and they both agreed that he would keep his distance from her and their children. Turland said that Hendrix also learns the truth about his childhood and Pierce and Lisa's deal, which makes "an impact on Hendrix and is a switching point where he goes from brat to adult." Turland called it his favourite moment of his character's story so far.

=== Relationship with Harlow Robinson ===
In January 2020, the writers decided to explore the chemistry between Hendrix and Harlow. Harlow is "shaken" by the feelings she has for Hendrix when she sees him take off his shirt. She later admits to Mackenzie that she has a crush on him, but dislikes his personality. Meanwhile, Hendrix notices that Harlow appears to like him and tests this by visiting her without a shirt on, and later performs push-ups in front of her. After teasing a romance between the characters for a number of weeks, the pair eventually "give into temptation" during a Mardi Gras event. Hendrix and Harlow make "weird eye contact" during the evening, but are seemingly afraid of acting on their feelings, until Harlow turns to Hendrix for comfort after learning some bad news about her mother Prue Wallace (Denise Van Outen). After their kiss, Hendrix worries when Harlow does not contact him and he turns to Pierce for advice, as he thinks she is ghosting him. They have a "rare heart-to-heart" and Pierce points out that Hendrix could be overthinking things. When Hendrix and Harlow meet again, Hendrix learns Harlow has been focussed on her mother's return.

The couple later take a romantic trip to Pierce's island, where Elly Conway's (Jodi Anasta) birthday celebrations are taking place. They get off to a bad start when Harlow struggles to relax after learning about a lie her mother told. Eventually Hendrix makes a useful suggestion that gets Harlow to loosen up and the almost consummate their relationship, until things between them become "awkward" and Harlow leaves the tent. Hendrix finds the rest of the party in the morning, but Harlow is not there because she has fallen down a mineshaft with Bea Nilsson (Bonnie Anderson) and been bitten by a snake. As she recovers from her ordeal, Hendrix is shown supporting Harlow after the death of her mother. Donovan commented that they were a good couple, adding "You could see it from the get-go that there was going to be something between them – they love each other!" Hendrix and Harlow's relationship continues into the following year, but Turland warned that his character's future storylines could see them break-up. He told Joe Julians of the Radio Times that Harlow's grandfather Paul Robinson (Stefan Dennis) "doesn't help this situation" – he is constantly at him." Like Donovan, Turland said the couple had "a connection", but their relationship had been tested to the point that they might "go in different directions". Turland expressed his hope that if that were to happen, they would eventually get back together.

=== Gambling and downward spiral ===
Following Pierce's departure, Hendrix moves in with Karl and Susan. He also secures employment at Lassiters Hotel. However, this is short lived when he accidentally injures Terese Willis (Rebekah Elmaloglou). Turland explained that Hendrix really dislikes being told what to do, and coupled with being sent to work in laundry, where he does not have much experience, it leads to frustration for Hendrix. He kicks various items in the room including a bottle being used as a doorstop, which later leads to Terese becoming trapped in the hot room. Hendrix feels guilty about what he has done and confesses to Harlow, before quitting the job. He then becomes "desperate" for money, knowing that he has to pay rent, so he turns to his new friend Jay Rebecchi (Dhruv Malge), who suggests taking part in blackjack games. Turland told Inside Soap's Alice Penwill that Jay is looking out for his friend when he makes the suggestion. He continued: "I think Jay looks up to Hendrix a bit and wants to help him out, and the only way that Jay knows how to make money is from playing blackjack. Hendrix loves the idea as it's easy cash, he doesn't have to do much work, and it's a bit of a thrill." Jay finds them a private game, where Hendrix learns it is being run by Kane Jones (Barry Conrad), who used to organise a local fight club. Turland said Kane puts "a lot of pressure" on Hendrix and that with Pierce gone, Hendrix is being forced into taking responsibility for his own actions. Turland told Penwill that Hendrix loves the thrill and the money, adding "I guess that's how you manage to get caught up and develop a gambling problem..." Turland also expressed his delight at Hendrix having a big solo storyline, as it allowed him to "really get deep into the character."

Hendrix ends up in debt to Kane, who later threatens his life when he fails to pay up, so Hendrix acquires a gun to protect himself. Turland stated that Hendrix gets the gun purely for protection, as he has no idea what Kane might do after sending him a bullet in the post. Turland continued saying that Hendrix wants to be ready for anything, but after Chloe nearly catches him with the gun, he and Jay hide it in the Kennedy's pizza oven. Turland told that Hendrix thinks he has convinced housemate Bea not to use the oven, but she uses it anyway. Turland commented "Hendrix and Jay hear the explosion – and realise something is wrong!" Jay's father Shane Rebecchi (Nicholas Coghlan) suffers a gunshot wound to the leg. Turland explained that Hendrix did not mean for anyone to get hurt, saying "His problems suddenly become 10 times worse, and Hendrix is totally terrified, and forced to tell the truth." Not long after, Harlow is kidnapped and Hendrix believes Kane is responsible because he has been unable to pay his debts. He thinks that Kane has taken Harlow to scare him. Turland described the situation as "awful" for Hendrix, as he loves Harlow and would be unable to forgive himself if anything happened to her. Harlow is soon rescued, but remains "shaken" by the ordeal. Harlow then decides to end her relationship with Hendrix, leaving him "heartbroken". Turland admitted that he was "quite upset" by Hendrix and Harlow's break-up because he enjoyed the relationship, saying "We've had a lot of fun building that up ever since I started in the show, as there's always been a chemistry there."

Turland thought the break-up would shock viewers, who had also come to love the characters' relationship, but he realised that Harlow had every reason to end it, as Hendrix had "stuffed up quite a bit". He also described the break-up scenes as upsetting. Turland thought there was potential for the couple to reunite in the future, as Harlow was a big part of Hendrix's life and she was the reason he stayed in Erinsborough. He also confirmed that Hendrix "loses a lot of love for himself" in the wake of the break-up. Turland pointed out that while Hendrix had brought everything on himself, he also finds it tough to live with himself and goes through "an emotional spiral". Turland believed that Hendrix had to experience the downward spiral before he could come back and learn from the situation. Turland hoped his character would make better decisions going forward. Hendrix's struggles continue as he decides returns to high school, having previously dropped out to find a job. An Inside Soap writer noted that it is clear his confidence is low following his troubles with Kane. Things get worse when a "furious" Harlow learns that he sold the Christmas present she bought him to pay off his debts. Feeling like no one is on his side, Hendrix allows his emotions to come to a head and his subsequent public outburst shocks those around him. Hendrix considers dropping out of school again, but newly introduced teacher Curtis Perkins (Nathan Borg) persuades him to stay on. Harlow soon starts dating Brent Colefax (Texas Watterson), who Hendrix clashed with in the past. Donovan thought Hendrix would find it "challenging" seeing Harlow and Brent together.

=== Relationship with Mackenzie Hargreaves ===
The connection between Hendrix and Mackenzie was revisited in 2021, as they establish a romantic relationship. Laura Masia of TV Week noted that the pair's friendship was "a constant" throughout the previous year, and Stone replied "After all the drama and pain of the past year, they've found a safe place with each other where they can have a laugh and be happy and forget about the world for a bit." The dynamic between them changes after Hendrix asks Mackenzie to help catch a spider and they nearly kiss. Stone explained to Masia that as they try to get the spider off the couch, they accidentally fall into each other's arms. The spark from the first time they met comes back and there is a clear attraction between them. Stone joked, "The spark has always been there – they just needed a little Neighbours hijinks to push them in the right direction!" Hendrix and Mackenzie think their friendship has been "ruined", but they clear the air and decide to remain friends. However, when Mackenzie cancels plans to hang out with him, Hendrix misses her company and his reaction hints at his strong feelings for her.

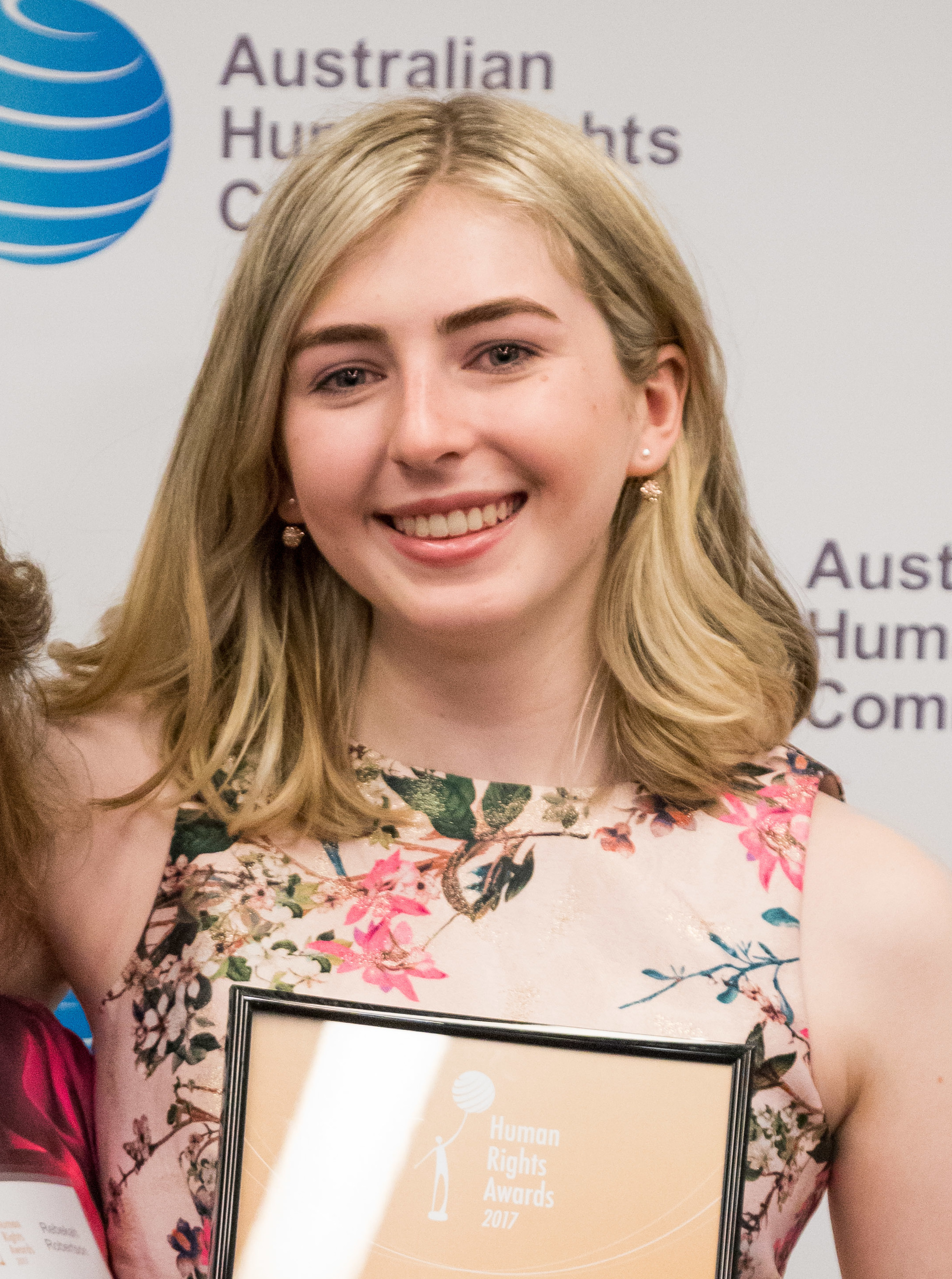
Hendrix shared the show's first transgender kiss and wedding with Mackenzie, played by Georgie Stone (pictured).

Stone admitted to having a bad reaction to the pairing because she was heavily invested in her character's relationship with Richie Amblin (Lachie Morris). She thought Richie was what Mackenzie needed at the time, but she was enjoying the more playful, happier side of her character that Hendrix brought out in her. She also said Hendrix made Mackenzie feel more "grounded" and "sure of herself". When asked by Joe Julians of the Radio Times if Mackenzie was being honest with herself about why she only wanted to be friends with Hendrix, Stone replied "I think she was starting to like him that way but I don't think she was cognisant of it. I think she was very keen to just chalk it down to friendship and finding new closeness with someone after her recent love issues, so I don't think she thought that it was romantic. I think she was telling the truth." Hendrix and Mackenzie hold off on telling Harlow about their romance to avoid upsetting her, following her own relationship break up. Stone pointed out that Mackenzie also puts off actually dating Hendrix properly, but it becomes harder for her to keep everyone happy.

The opportunity to tell Harlow is taken away from the couple when she walks in on them as they are getting closer. Stone called it a complicated situation and told Sarah Ellis of Inside Soap: "Mackenzie and Hendrix are leaning in for a kiss – they're holding hands, and it's a really charged moment. Harlow walks in and sees, and obviously it's a very shocking thing to witness your best friend kissing your ex-boyfriend!" An angry Harlow accuses the pair of dating behind her back and the friendship between her and Mackenzie breaks down. When asked who Mackenzie would choose out of Harlow and Hendrix, Stone replied that Harlow was Mackenzie's first proper friend, while her romance with Hendrix is "adorable". She thought her character would be angry if Harlow made her choose, especially as their whole friendship group would fall apart, but it would make for good drama to play out. Weeks later, the couple make plans to have sex for the first time and Hendrix prepares a romantic dinner. But just as Mackenzie arrives, one of the candles falls over and starts a fire, ruining the night.

In late 2021, Turland teased some trouble for Hendrix, following the introduction of teenager Zara Selwyn (Freya Van Dyke). He commented that Hendrix becomes "a bit of a mentor" to her and hinted at potential heartbreak for Hendrix and Mackenzie. Hendrix supports Zara when she is accused of setting a series of fires and becomes isolated from her friends and job. Their friendship causes issues between Hendrix and Mackenzie. Turland told Masia (TV Week) that Hendrix stands up for Zara because he sees similarities between them. He wanted to spend more time with his father when he first moved to the street, like Zara wants more time with her mother. Hendrix knows he made bad choices and he wants to stop Zara from doing the same. Masia noted that Hendrix is acting as an older brother to Zara, but she mistakes his kindness for romantic interest. Van Dyke told Masia that Zara thinks Hendrix has feelings for her after misinterpreting his concern for her well-being. Hendrix is caught off-guard when Zara kisses him. Turland stated "He feels annoyed, confused and sheepish. Mackenzie did warn him."

Stone said Mackenzie is "hurt and furious" with Zara when she finds out about the kiss. She is also upset with Hendrix, but she feels more betrayed by Zara. At the same time, Mackenzie realises that the evidence for Zara being the firebug does not add up. She finds Zara at the school, where they soon become trapped by a fire started by Sadie Rodwell (Emerald Chan) and Aubrey Laing (Etoile Little). While Zara manages to get out, Mackenzie is stuck and almost passes out, but Hendrix goes inside and helps her into an air vent. Stone told a TV Week columnist that Hendrix starts to accept that they will likely die, until a firefighter appears and gets them out. As a consequence of the fire, Hendrix is later diagnosed with pulmonary fibrosis. This prompts him to take Mackenzie to his home city of Sydney to visit his parents. There, Hendrix makes the spontaneous decision to propose to Mackenzie. Speaking to Inside Soap's Alice Penwill, Turland explained that Mackenzie has "opened Hendrix's eyes to a different way of thinking. She makes his life a little less chaotic, and more wholesome." He continued saying that the trip forces Hendrix to think about who and what he wants in his life, so proposing to Mackenzie makes sense. Turland realised that the couple were young and the proposal was not planned, but Hendrix knows that he wants to get married.

The wedding takes place a couple of weeks later, before Hendrix undergoes a lung transplant. Writers created a fairy tale wedding for the couple, which is something Mackenzie had often brought up in the show. Stone called Hendrix the love of Mackenzie's life and she thought the wedding brought both characters' story arc "full circle". Turland was excited by the chance to film a Neighbours wedding, as well as being part of the first ceremony featuring a transgender character. He was happy that Hendrix got to experience an "amazing event with Mackenzie and that he was surrounded by love – it was a great scene." He later told Ellis that Hendrix and Mackenzie's relationship was important for the show on many levels. He thought there were "a lot of good messages" to come out of the storyline. He also said that while it covered "a lot of bases", their relationship was ultimately "very caring" and he was glad that he and Stone were the couple to do that. Stone admitted to being jealous of Pierce's gift of a mortgage-free apartment for the couple to start their life together. Turland added that the wedding was his character's "happy ending".

=== Pulmonary fibrosis and departure ===
The school fire plot led to a major new storyline for Hendrix, as several scenes show him suffering serious coughing fits in the aftermath. He is soon diagnosed with autoimmune disease sarcoidosis, which is treatable. However, he is then informed that it has developed into pulmonary fibrosis and he needs a lung transplant. Of the moment he learned about the story, Turland told Kilkelly: "I was taken into the office and told that they wanted to do this storyline and it was going to be quite big. I was honoured to take it on, and it's been really good to explore it with everybody." The storyline had a slow build up from the fire to Hendrix eventually receiving his diagnosis, with Turland calling it "a good challenge" for him. Hendrix's diagnosis also affects other characters around him, including Mackenzie, Karl, Susan and Chloe. Turland enjoyed sitting down with Stone to work out how their characters would cope with the diagnosis. He commented "It's been nice to explore a different side of their love, but also the fear and worry they feel over Hendrix's condition. Turland pointed out that Hendrix's diagnosis was not a death sentence and that the lung transplant gave him a good chance at survival. He also described the plot as "a rollercoaster" for Hendrix. Turland spoke with a family member who was diagnosed with pulmonary fibrosis, as well as relatives who had friends die from the condition, who told him that the story was "pretty accurate" and found that hearing that from them was "enough."

Not long after, Sadie and her family move onto the street. Turland explained to Masia (TV Week) that Hendrix is uncomfortable with the family living next door to him and his "happy place." He also feels overwhelmed by the thought of having to see them regularly on the street. Turland believed that the Rodwells' presence would remind Hendrix of his illness when all he wants is to have a normal life with Mackenzie and not have to think about it. The show's executive producer Jason Herbison later wrote a special episode which focused solely on Hendrix's storyline, as he and Mackenzie go to Sydney to tell his family about his diagnosis. The episode explored the character's fictional backstory, as Hendrix takes Mackenzie around his favourite places from his childhood. Robards and Allsop reprised their roles as Hendrix's parents Pierce and Lisa, while his sisters Alana Greyson (Molly Broadstock) and Maeve Rowsthorn (Beatrix Van Vliet) made their first appearances. Turland enjoyed working with Broadstock to form the relationship between Hendrix and Alana, and he was pleased that the audience would finally get to see Hendrix as a big brother.

The storyline culminates in Hendrix's death, as his lung transplant goes wrong and leaves him with hours to live. Turland explained that after Hendrix almost loses the opportunity to have the lung transplant, the operation goes ahead and appears to be successful, until his body starts to reject the new lungs. Hendrix then spends his last moments with his family, before dying. Turland called the scene in which Hendrix says his goodbyes to Mackenzie and the Kennedys, as "really intense". He also found the story to be one of the most challenging things he had ever had to film, as it tested his acting skills. The episode featuring Hendrix's death was written by long-term scriptwriter Sarah Mayberry. She enjoyed writing the episode as it was "all emotion" from start to finish, but she admitted that she "bawled my eyes out for two weeks writing it."

Turland had decided to leave Neighbours in order to try new roles and pursue work overseas, before the show was cancelled in early 2022. Producers decided to kill Hendrix off and Turland told Ellis that he was surprised by the decision, saying "Initially it was a bit of a shock. However, the storyline was explained – and while it's sad because Hendrix is such a young guy, it's also quite beautiful as the character comes full circle with his family, and also finds the love of his life with Mackenzie." Turland was particularly pleased that the story showed Hendrix changing from a selfish character to one who was appreciative of his family and friends. He explained that when Hendrix learns he is dying, he is aware of how loved he is and Turland thought that was what anyone in a similar situation would hope to feel. Turland added that his last few weeks on set were also "intense" and he was exhausted by the "rollercoaster of emotions" he had to play as part of Hendrix's storylines. He was also hopeful that Hendrix could appear in the final episode of Neighbours as part of a dream sequence. Turland did make a brief appearance as Hendrix in the final episode broadcast on 28 July 2022.

== Other appearances ==
The character also appears in the first Neighbours spin-off Erinsborough High, which was released in November 2019. The series is set at the local high school and explores various issues concerning teenagers, including bullying, mental health, sexuality, and peer pressure. Turland was grateful to be part of the show's first spin-off, saying "A spin off is an achievement in itself, and I was one of the main characters. I can relate to the topics and problems they covered because I've seen a lot of my friends go though similar situations. It made it real, and it's nice to see Australian television talking about such topics." Turland liked that the series was more edgy and grungy than the main show. He believed viewers would be "taken aback" by it, and described it as "a bit more personal, and you really get to see the different journeys for each character – from where they start in the first episode, to where they finish in the fifth." Turland explained that viewers would see what happens in the school during exam week. The students are under pressure and then put into difficult situations on top of that. He also said that they would get to a see a new side to Hendrix that he has not shown in Neighbours.

Each character produces their own video diary in the series and Turland said that you get more of an understanding of how Hendrix is really feeling when he is not putting on his "cool guy" act. Turland continued saying "As he talks to the camera, you can see how things get to him." Turland thought this plot device made the spin-off really special. Matthew Myers of DNA magazine pointed out that the show was "a turning point" for the character. Turland agreed, saying that Hendrix goes from being the most popular student at the school to being one of the most vulnerable. Much like his classmate Jeremiah Annan (Darius Amarfio Jefferson), Hendrix realises that he also has no friends and feels like he has to be there for Jeremiah. Turland also told Myers that Hendrix "is scared and lost." He described his character's story as beautiful, and hoped that the character of Jeremiah would be introduced to the main show, as he and Hendrix establish a friendship and bond.

== Reception ==
For his portrayal of Hendrix, Turland received a nomination for Best Daytime Star at the 2022 Inside Soap Awards.

Turland acknowledged the negative viewer reaction to his character's questionable actions, saying "The fan reaction has been how every normal human would feel about Hendrix's behaviour – quite horrified!" He thought the fans were reacting in an expected manner and noted how they were saying that "Hendrix needs to pull his head in." The character's attitude towards women in his early storylines also attracted controversy among viewers.

When Hendrix planned to drop out of school, Bridget McManus of The Sydney Morning Herald called the character a "school-refuser" and said he received "a wake-up call from Australia’s nicest principal, Susan (Jackie Woodburne)." Madison Hockey of TV Week branded the character a "troublesome teen". Likewise, Briannah Devlin of Southern Highland News called Hendrix "a troubled, rich, impulsive teenager who initially likes to live by his own rules." She also said that he had "a chip on his shoulder", but he eventually put "his bad boy reputation behind him". Similarly, a contributor to 10Play, stated "Oozing with teen angst, Hendrix found himself in strife more times than not." They also noted that he had "put his bad boy days behind him."

"Another Neighbours tragedy we're still not over! And as Susan mourned the fact that so many had missed the chance to reach their full potential, Hendrix was briefly revived to share a dance with wife Mackenzie Hargreaves (Georgie Stone).

As he twirled her around, all seemed right with the world, before we were suddenly transported back to the show's reality as Mackenzie was immersed in the festivities with Curtis Perkins (Nathan Borg)".

— Laura Denby from Radio Times on Hendrix's brief finale return.

Digital Spy's Daniel Kilkelly praised Turland's performance in the special Sydney-based episode. He thought it was "reassuring" that the regular characters were still getting their "time to shine" among the returnees and build up to the show's finale. He stated "Ben's performances have been praised by fans ever since he joined the show in 2019, but he'd been underused in recent months. It's pleasing to now see him take centre stage in his biggest storyline yet, as we head towards the end of Neighbours itself."

Yahoo! Entertainment's Laura Denby praised the pairing of Hendrix and Mackenzie throughout the pulmonary fibrosis plot. She wrote that they initially provided "light relief through their heartwarming scenes", and Hendrix's condition "sparked some stunning moments for the soap". She also wrote that Hendrix's death might have come across as unnecessary if Turland had not decided to leave the show before it was cancelled, explaining "tearing the couple apart in such a tragic way is the only believable outcome. A hastily written exit or tiresome cheating trope simply wouldn't have made sense for these two; and as a result Hendrix and Mackenzie will be remembered as one of Neighbours' strongest romantic partnerships."

Sarah Ellis of Inside Soap branded the character's "tear-jerking death" as "one of the saddest we've ever seen in Neighbours." Helen Daly of the Radio Times reported that the decision to kill Hendrix off received some backlash from fans, who were angry about Mackenzie, a "prominent" trans character experiencing so much tragedy. Actress Annie Wallace also criticised the plot, mentioning the "tragic trans trope", and asking why Hendrix and Mackenzie could not have had a happy ending. The serial's story editor Shane Isheev later explained that the storyline was planned before Neighbours was cancelled, after Turland quit the role. He added that Stone wanted her character to have "the full soap experience." The Episode featuring Hendrix's death was nominated for an Australian Director's Guild Award and won, with the award being presented to writer Sarah Mayberry.
