= 13th Summer =

- Directed by: Tam Sainsbury
- Written by: Jeremy Stanford
- Starring: Hannah Levien; Nathan Phillips; Bec Cartwright; Jeremy Stanford; Ben Turland; Georgie Parker
- Cinematography: Esteban Rivera
- Edited by: Bill Missett
- Music by: Kanoa Wolfe-Doblin
- Distributed by: 9Gem; Tubi
- Release date: 26 December 2023 (Australia)
- Running time: 96 minutes
- Country: Australia
- Language: English

13th Summer is a 2023 Australian film that was filmed on the Fraser Coast of Queensland in late 2022, and directed by Tam Sainsbury.

It was Bec Hewitt's first onscreen acting role in almost 13 years. It received its Australian premiere on Nine Network's free-to-air digital television channel, 9Gem on 26 December 2023. It is free to stream on Tubi.

== Cast ==
- Hannah Levien as Vee Byrnes
- Nathan Phillips as Ben Trainor
- Ben Turland as Alex Hallsworth
- Jeremy Stanford as Patrick Robinson
- Bec Hewitt as Kate Robinson
- Georgie Parker as Constable Debbie Collins
- James Patrick Reed as Murray
- Ned Stanford as Supermarket Boy

== Production ==
The film was inspired by A Knife in Water.
