= Neighbours: Erinsborough High =

Australian web television series

- Genre: Soap opera Teen drama
- Created by: Jason Herbison
- Directed by: Jonathon Dutton
- Starring: Olivia Junkeer; Benny Turland; Georgie Stone; Lachlan Millar; Darius Amarfio-Jefferson; Grace O'Sullivan
- Country of origin: Australia
- Original language: English
- No. of seasons: 1
- No. of episodes: 5

Production
- Executive producer: Jason Herbison
- Producer: Natalie Lynch
- Running time: 22 minutes

Original release
- Network: My5; 10 Play
- Release: 11 November 2019

Related
- Neighbours

Neighbours: Erinsborough High is an Australian television series produced for video on demand and catch up TV services My5 and 10 Play. It was released on 11 November 2019. The series is a spin-off of soap opera Neighbours. Featuring new and regular characters from the main show, the series follows a group of students at Erinsborough High School as they prepare for their final exams, and focuses on the various issues they are facing, as well as the disappearance of one of the students.

== Premise ==
Neighbours: Erinsborough High takes place during the Year 12 exam period, and explores issues that affect teenagers at school, including bullying, sexuality, parental and peer pressure, and teacher-student relationships. The episodes also focus on the revelations caused by the disappearance of a popular student.

== Cast and characters ==
- Olivia Junkeer as Yashvi Rebecchi
- Benny Turland as Hendrix Greyson
- Jemma Donovan as Harlow Robinson
- Georgie Stone as Mackenzie Hargreaves
- Rob Mills as Finn Kelly
- Sharon Johal as Dipi Rebecchi
- Lachlan Millar as Richie Amblin
- Darius Amarfio-Jefferson as Jeremiah Annan
- Mahalia Brown as Cherie Reyner
- Nikolai Egel as Marty Muggleton
- Grace O'Sullivan as Olivia Lane
- Ellmir Asipi as Ollie Sudekis
- Amanda Harrison as Angela Lane

== Episodes ==
No.	Title	Directed by	Written by	Original release date
1	"Monday"	Jonathon Dutton	Nicolette Minster	11 November 2019
2	"Tuesday"	Jonathon Dutton	Jessica Paine	11 November 2019
3	"Wednesday"	Jonathon Dutton	Melanie Sano	11 November 2019
4	"Thursday"	Jonathon Dutton	Matthew Bon	11 November 2019
5	"Friday"	Jonathon Dutton	Libby Butler	11 November 2019

== Production ==
=== Conception and development ===
The show was developed by Neighbours executive producer Jason Herbison, who had wanted to create a Neighbours spin-off for a number of years. Herbison told Andrew Mercado of Mediaweek that a "there has always been talk" about creating a spin-off centred around the hospital, police station, or high school environments, but as it had been 20 years since the end of Heartbreak High, the high school was "an obvious choice". Herbison commented, "It's great for teen-based and intergenerational stories with students, teachers and cranky parents." The serial's UK broadcaster Channel 5 liked the idea of focusing on the high school and commissioned the spin-off with the support of Network 10. They had also wanted an exclusive programme for their VOD platform My5, after Neighbours' ratings increased in July 2019, which Herbison said "was unusual because volume usually dips during a UK summer".

Neighbours: Erinsborough High is the first spin-off series of Neighbours. Producers use the series to explore issues that affect a younger audience. Herbison described it as "an exciting opportunity to shine a light on one of our most iconic playing areas – the local high school. It's long been an ambition to delve deeper into some of our workplaces and the characters who populate them. Who knows what we might do next?" Herbison also confirmed that the cast would be familiar to viewers, as they were introduced during the main show a few months beforehand. Mercado reported that the series has a dark tone and the storylines focus on "social issues, inappropriate behaviour and the sweetest moment for ground-breaking Mackenzie (Georgie Stone)."

Cast member Olivia Junkeer said the series is noticeably different from Neighbours, as the storylines are "grittier, darker and more sinister". The series also uses different cameras and lighting, and the scripts contain swear words. Junkeer also confirmed that it would follow the same storylines as the main show, so her character "has the exact same mindset" and what happens to her in Neighbours is also mentioned in the spin-off. She thought the series would relate to teenagers in 2019, as it highlights the "ups and downs of high school" and "dives into social media, relationships between girls and boys, girls and girls, boys and boys. It shows every side to being a teenager and it's excellent."

During the episodes, each character makes a video diary, which allows the audience to hear and see their innermost thoughts. Actor Benny Turland said this format helps to show how his character Hendrix Greyson is really feeling beyond the "cool guy act" he puts on. He explained, "as he talks to the camera, you can see how things get to him. It makes it a lot more personal, and I think those video diaries are one of the things that make Erinsborough High special."

=== Casting and filming ===
Several cast members from Neighbours cross over to Neighbours: Erinsborough High. Neighbours regulars Olivia Junkeer (Yashvi Rebecchi) and Benny Turland (Hendrix Greyson), and recurring stars Georgie Stone (Mackenzie Hargreaves) and Lachlan Miller (Richie Amblin), play major roles in the spin-off, along with Grace O'Sullivan and Darius Amarfio-Jefferson as Olivia Lane and Jeremiah Annan respectively. Stone reprised her role following her initial Neighbours storyline, prior to returning as a regular cast member in 2020. O'Sullivan appeared in Neighbours prior to her role in Erinsborough High, leading in to the spin-off's storyline. Nikolai Egel and Mahalia Brown appear as teachers Marty Muggleton and Cherie Reyner respectively, characters who have both appeared intermittently in Neighbours since September 2019. Ellmir Asipi also reprises his Neighbours guest role of Ollie Sudekis. Regular Neighbours cast members Jemma Donovan (Harlow Robinson), Rob Mills (Finn Kelly) and Sharon Johal (Dipi Rebecchi) also appear, along with Amanda Harrison (Angela Lane).

Neighbours: Erinsborough High is produced and distributed by Fremantle. The series was filmed at Fremantle's Global Television studios in Forest Hill, Victoria, where the main show is also filmed. The episodes are directed by Jonathon Dutton, produced by Natalie Lynch, and executively produced by Herbison.

=== Post-production ===
==== Adoption of Final Cut Pro X ====
When Neighbours producers Natalie Lynch & Natalie Mandel were in the planning stages for Erinsborough High in May 2019, they reached out to LateNite Films to get a quote for the visual effects and colour grading for the series. The original plan was for the in-house Neighbours post team to handle data wrangling and offline editing using Media Composer at their studios in Nunawading, and LateNite team will tackle grade, sound, online and delivery. However, by July it was agreed that LateNite Films would handle the full post-production workflow using Final Cut Pro X. LateNite Films Producer and Editor Chris Hocking told Ronny Courtens of fcp.co that "The producers gave us a huge amount of freedom and trust to use whatever tools we wanted, and allowed us to design our own workflow." He said that he is used to an Avid workflow and love certain aspects about it, but feels way more creative when using Final Cut Pro X.

==== Editing and finishing ====
The post-production process began in one of the spare production offices, with the LateNite Films Post Production crew Chris Hocking and Kevin Luk assembling the show starting from the first day of the shoot. The main show has a traditional paper-based workflow, and a maximum of two card dumps a day, while Hocking adopted a paperless workflow and ingested cards up to six times a day. The footage was synchronized through an automated process with third-party software, and Luk organised the files into ScriptSync-style keywords which he had prepared based on the script before the shoot. The process enabled Luk to assemble all five episodes in a couple of hours after wrapping the whole shoot.

Chris Hocking continued the director cut in the LateNite office. He completed the rest of the editing process within Final Cut Pro X, and some audio clean up which was done in iZotope RX7. Both Hocking and Luk did a few VFX cleanups in After Effects & Mocha Pro, and Luk completed the grade within Final Cut Pro X. Hocking recalled the audio mixing process within Final Cut Pro X was more time consuming compared to using a DAW such as Pro Tools or Logic Pro X. Still, he recognized the benefits for budget reasons and creative flexibility. "if I couldn't fix something easily in the sound design stage, we didn't have time to do ADR for example, I could simply adjust the edit there and then."

== Broadcast ==
The series spans five 22-minute episodes, which run parallel to the main show. They were available to watch as a box set from 11 November 2019 on My5 and 12 November on 10 Play. The series was also available on RTÉ Player in Ireland from 11 November the same day as My5's release.

== Reception ==
Johnathon Hughes of the Radio Times said the series was "edgier and looser than Neighbours proper, with impressive production values and stylistic touches that establish an identity outside of the parent programme". He named Junkeer, Turland and Amarfio-Jefferson as "standouts" and praised Neighbours for the diversity amongst the cast. Hughes felt that unlike some "gimmicky" spin-offs, there was "a sense of point and purpose to this", and while the series was released into the competitive teen high-school drama market "the pacy, involving first episode sets up as an impressive attempt at bringing soap sensibilities to the streaming drama landscape."

Digital Spy's Daniel Kilkelly thought the series "set itself apart from the main show with a unique "grungy" filming style – a far cry from the sun-kissed scenes we're used to on Neighbours itself." He noted the strong performances by the central teenage cast and the focus on Mackenzie's romance with Richie, which paved "the way for some important and groundbreaking scenes in episodes four and five, exploring Mackenzie's transgender story in much more detail than the main show, with some open and thought-provoking conversations."

Jessica Lynch from 10 daily dubbed the spin-off "Riverdale meets Pretty Little Liars". She wrote that the first episode has "an air of that Neighbours-style drama we know and love", before giving viewers "major PLL vibes".
