= Ben Turland =

Australian actor and dancer (born 1998)

- Born: Benjamin Turland; 13 July 1998 (age 28); Mittagong, New South Wales, Australia
- Other name: Benny Turland
- Occupations: Actor, dancer
- Years active: 2012–present

Benjamin Turland (born 13 July 1998) is an Australian actor and dancer. Turland won the grand final of the revived Young Talent Time series with his dance group Lil' Banditz Krew, before going onto the semi-final of Australia's Got Talent. He later appeared as a dancer on The X Factor Australia and The Voice Australia. In 2014, he made a guest appearance in the drama series Love Child and played Jordan Walsh in Home and Away during 2016. From 2019 until 2022, Turland portrayed Hendrix Greyson in fellow Australian soap opera Neighbours. He also appeared in the spin-off Erinsborough High, and was nominated for Best Daytime Star at the Inside Soap Awards. After leaving Neighbours, Turland appeared in the television miniseries Riptide as Ethan Weston. He filmed a role in the 2023 thriller 13 Summers and joined the supporting cast of Paper Dolls. The Casting Guild of Australia named Turland as one of its 12 Rising Stars of 2023.

== Early life ==
Turland grew up in Mittagong and Bowral in the Southern Highlands of New South Wales. He has an older brother and sister. Turland began dancing when he was three years old, and experienced some bullying as he was the only male dancer in his town. He attended Bowral High School, where he became interested in acting. He later studied performing arts.

== Career ==
In 2012, Turland appeared on the revival of Young Talent Time with the all boys dance group Lil' Banditz Krew when he 12 years old. The group won the grand final and then toured Australia. Two years later, Turland made it to the semi-final of Australia's Got Talent. He later admitted that his experience with the show made him want to pursue an acting career. He also appeared as a dancer on The X Factor Australia, and he choreographed a tour for the series winner. In 2014, Turland guested in the first season of Nine Network drama Love Child. He joined the recurring cast of soap opera Home and Away as foster child Jordan Walsh in 2016. Turland later appeared on The Voice Australia as a dancer.

Turland appeared as Joey in the 2019 production of Saturday Night Fever at the Sydney Lyric. That same year, he joined the main cast of soap opera Neighbours as teenager Hendrix Greyson, the son of established character Pierce Greyson (Tim Robards). His manager had asked him to send in a self-tape, but did not tell him that he was not what the producers was initially looking for. Turland received an invitation to audition for the role and was flown to Melbourne for a chemistry read with Robards and Jemma Donovan (Harlow Robinson). Three days later, Turland was informed that he had the role. Hendrix was described as an entitled brat with a "bad attitude". Turland also appears as Hendrix in the online spin-off Erinsborough High. In 2022, Turland received a nomination for Best Daytime Star at the Inside Soap Awards.

Turland quit Neighbours in 2021 in order to pursue new roles and work overseas. His decision came just months before the show was cancelled in early 2022. Producers chose to kill his character off, and Hendrix dies after a failed lung transplant. Turland described his last few weeks on set as "intense" and he was left exhausted. Turland briefly appears as Hendrix in the serial's then-final episode broadcast on 28 July 2022. After leaving Neighbours, Turland filmed the television miniseries Riptide. He plays Ethan Weston, whose father dies in mysterious circumstances. It was filmed in five weeks at the Neighbours studios, Mount Eliza and the Dandenong Ranges. Turland said his "troubled" character needs "validation and love" from his father, adding "I think it's a good way to tell stories, especially for young men who don't know how to process their emotions."

Turland filmed a role in Jeremy Stanford's thriller film 13th Summer, which was shot in Hervey Bay in late 2022. Turland plays a "mysterious backpacker" who encounters the film's protagonists Ben (Nathan Phillips) and Vee (Hannah Levien). He joined the supporting cast of the Network 10/Paramount+ series Paper Dolls as Eli in March 2023. The drama was filmed in Sydney and follows fictional girl group Harlow, who are formed on a reality television show. Turland also appears in Rebel Wilson's directorial debut feature film The Deb. In November 2023, the Casting Guild of Australia named Turland as one of its '12 Rising Stars of 2023'.

Turland joined the cast of Heartbreak High as Liam for its third and final season in 2026. He also appears in Lincoln Younes first short film The Boys. In November 2026 appeared in Return to Paradise in third series episode two.

== Filmography ==
=== Film ===
Year	Title	Role	Notes
2013	Threaded	Jason	Short film
2023	13th Summer	Alex Hallsworth	
2026	The Deb	Razzie	
2026	The Boys	Burt	Short film

=== Television ===
Year	Title	Role	Notes
2014	Love Child	Ronnie	Episode: "#1.2" (as Bennie Turland)
2016	Home and Away	Jordan Walsh	Recurring role
2019	Erinsborough High	Hendrix Greyson	Main cast
2019–2022	Neighbours	Hendrix Greyson	Main cast
2022	Riptide	Ethan Weston	Miniseries
2023	Paper Dolls	Eli	Recurring role
2026	Heartbreak High	Liam	Recurring role
