= Pierce Greyson =

- Neighbours character
- Tim Robards as Pierce
- Portrayed by: Tim Robards (2018–2020, 2022); Don Hany (2020–2021)
- Duration: 2018–2022
- First appearance: 5 October 2018
- Last appearance: 6 July 2022
- Introduced by: Jason Herbison
In-universe information
- Occupation: Winery owner Co-owner of Lassiters Hotel
- Wife: Chloe Brennan (2019–2021)
- Sons: Hendrix Greyson
- Daughters: Alana Greyson

Pierce Greyson is a fictional character from the Australian television soap opera Neighbours, played by Tim Robards. Robards secured the role after making an acting career a priority at the beginning of 2018. His agent put him forward for the seven-week role and auditions took place shortly before he married his fiancée in Italy. He began filming the week he returned from his honeymoon and finished up just as his first scenes went to air. Robards said was open to a return if it was another short stint, but a permanent role would mean giving up his job as a chiropractor and relocating to Melbourne, where the serial is filmed. Robards made his first appearance as Pierce during the episode broadcast on 5 October 2018.

Pierce is characterised as a suave, intelligent, wealthy businessman. Robards described his personality as being a mix of Harvey Specter, Christian Grey, and Robert Redford. He is also loyal, caring, values family and will do anything to help those he loves. The character initially arrives to carry out a business deal, but is soon involved in an indecent proposal-style storyline with Chloe Brennan (April Rose Pengilly), whom he soon develops feelings for. The storyline also explored the subject of sex in return for payment. Following a failed hotel takeover venture, Pierce departed on 19 November 2018. Robards reprised the role the following year and joined the main cast. Christie Hayes also joined the soap as Pierce's fiancée, Ebony Buttrose, and the pair become involved in a love triangle with Chloe. Pierce and Chloe later reconcile, and producers established a new family unit with the introduction of Pierce's son Hendrix Greyson (Benny Turland), whose introduction also led to further exploration of Pierce's fictional backstory.

Chloe and Pierce later marry and their relationship is immediately tested by the arrival of Hendrix's mother Lisa Rowsthorn (Jane Allsop), who asks Pierce to father another child with her. Further problems are caused by the return of Naomi Canning (Morgana O'Reilly) in May 2020, as writers established a connection between her and Pierce. A misunderstanding leads Pierce and Chloe to realise they have communication issues. This is followed by a surprise pregnancy for the couple. Robards hoped that his experience at being a first time father-to-be helped with his performance during the storyline. When Chloe has a miscarriage, the couple's marriage becomes strained and Pierce relies on his friendship with Dipi Rebecchi (Sharon Johal), whom he later has an affair with. Robards thought Pierce was able to be vulnerable with Dipi, which is something he was not used to. Due to COVID-19 restrictions and social distancing rules on set, Johal's husband Ankur Dogra was employed for the kissing scenes.

Amidst the affair storyline, the character was recast to Don Hany, as Robards chose to finish up four weeks early amidst the COVID-19 pandemic, so he could return to Sydney to be with his pregnant wife. Robards explained that the recast meant less disruption, as an early exit would mean scripts and episodes would have to be rewritten. Robards' final episode aired on 19 October, with Hany's first episode airing four days later on 23 October. Hany took over the end of Pierce's affair storyline and subsequent exit from the show. Hany later reprised the role for a brief stint from 2 June 2021, as Pierce returns to check on his son and finalise a business deal. The following year, Robards returned to the role for a storyline focusing on Hendrix set and filmed in Sydney. The character received positive attention from critics for his good looks, while a TV Week writer described his relationship with Chloe as "messy, complicated and fleeting as any good Neighbours romance." Robards faced criticism for his lack of acting experience and the recast was not well received by viewers.

== Casting ==
On 19 July 2018, Mat Whitehead of Ten Daily reported that former Bachelor Australia participant Tim Robards had joined the cast as "wealthy investor" Pierce Greyson. Robards told Clare Rigden of Who that he had decided to make acting a priority at the beginning of the year, so he took lessons and worked with acting coaches. When his agent asked if he wanted to be put forward for the role of Pierce, Robards agreed, believing that he was ready. The role marked his "first proper audition" and took place in the week leading up to his wedding to Anna Heinrich in Italy. The show's executive producer Jason Herbison stated that Robards went through "a lengthy audition process and impressed us with his take on the character." He also worked with several of the show's actors before being cast. Robert Moran of the Sydney Morning Herald speculated that Herbison was anticipating criticism of Robards' casting with the statement, following similar criticism of "stunt-casting" surrounding reality stars.

Of securing the role, Robards said "I managed to get the lines down, did the auditions, and it turned out it was commencing shooting the week we returned – it fit in perfectly. It was a seven-week role and started, literally, the week we returned from our honeymoon." He admitted to being "super excited" about the role and found working with the show's actors to be "an amazing experience". Robards finished filming in early October 2018, shortly before his debut appearance aired on 5 October. Robards said he was open to a return if it was for another eight week stint, but a long term role would mean he and his wife would have to relocate to Melbourne, and he would have to give up his job as a chiropractor.

Robards later said that when he started, he hoped his co-stars would give him "a chance to prove himself", as he sensed that some of them had doubts about him. Robards made sure that they saw his "most serious side" and he worked hard on his scenes. He felt that his acting skills vastly improved during his Neighbours stint, saying "You know, I'm a good learner. And when I work hard, I work hard." Robards added that in order to help him win over his cast mates, he offered his chiropractic skills to those in need of them.

== Development ==
=== Characterisation ===
Robards said Pierce's personality is a mix of fictional characters Harvey Specter and Christian Grey, and actor Robert Redford. He enjoyed exploring the mix of their various traits, saying that Pierce has "a number layers to him", which made him interesting to play. Pierce is also billed as having a "super suave nature and good looks". The character's fictional backstory detailed on the official Neighbours website states that Pierce was not born into money, but instead created a business with one vineyard, before investing in an international wine conglomerate and various hospitality ventures. Robards later described him as "an investor, a very wealthy businessman who has built up his wealth through hard work and being an intelligent guy. He's very self-assured, hard to read and he doesn't give a lot away. It's not always plain sailing in Erinsborough and the stakes for him get much higher." Pierce often puts up a guard when it comes to romance, but he is loyal and caring. He also "values family and would do anything to help the ones he loves." When asked how Pierce would fare on The Bachelor, Robards thought some of the women might be "blindsided" by his wealth and would not try as hard to get to know him. He also said Pierce is not a good dancer, adding "so for 'Mr Cool', that's a weakness – and you might actually get to see some of that soon..." Robards later described Pierce as "resilient", especially in business, which has led to much success. He also said that his character "always looks for the positives, he always wants to push through".

While reflecting on his Neighbours stint, Robards admitted that he had regrets about not making Pierce "as interesting as he might have been." Citing actor Samuel L. Jackson, who often gives his characters idiosyncrasies, Robards told Dan Williams of Men's Health that if he were going into Neighbours today, he would likely try to give Pierce some "quirks" from the beginning. He thought it would give him "more to play with", as he felt that he kept the character "too simple."

=== First stint ===
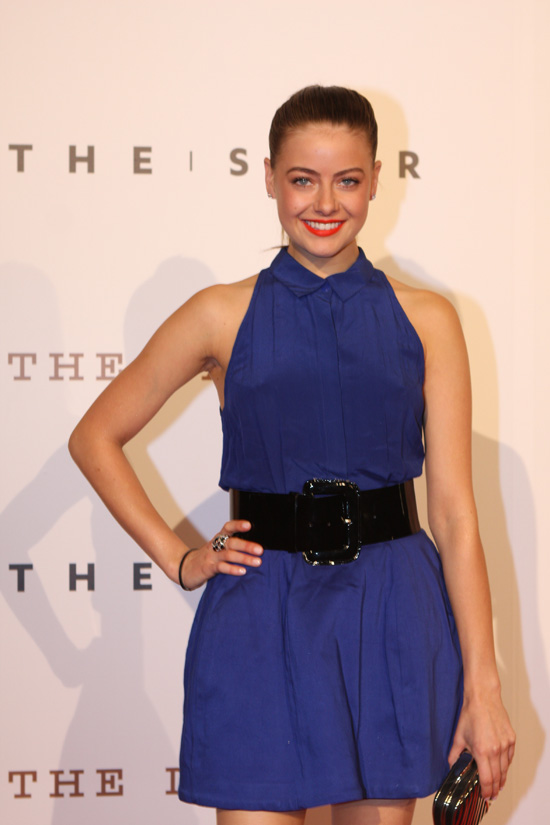
Robards said Pierce was not expecting to fall for Chloe Brennan, played by April Rose Pengilly (pictured), during his time in Erinsborough.

In the character's casting announcement, it was stated that "romance is also on the cards and hearts could be broken", indicating that Pierce would find a love interest during his time in Erinsborough. He soon comes into contact with Chloe Brennan (April Rose Pengilly) when he arrives in Erinsborough to do a business deal with Paul Robinson (Stefan Dennis) and Leo Tanaka (Tim Kano) at Lassiters Hotel. Producers created an indecent proposal-style storyline for the pair, as Pierce soon learns Chloe runs an escort service offering platonic dates and asks to become one of her clients. Robards commented that Pierce is "taken by her ingenuity and approach to things" upon their first meeting. Chloe turns him down, as she does not want to jeopardise the deal he has with Lassiters, however, Pierce later books Chloe's services using a pseudonym and they get on well. During a second date, Pierce leaves Chloe "shellshocked" when he asks her to spend the night with him. She accompanies him to his hotel room, where he gives her a necklace, but she turns down his proposition. Robards said that Pierce has developed feelings for Chloe, explaining "He sees her business almost as a challenge to get her to fall a bit deeper. He wasn't expecting it, but he realises he has feelings for this girl."

The storyline later explores the subject of sex in return for payment. While working together one evening, Chloe and Pierce have sex. Pierce then sends Chloe the necklace and a bottle of wine afterwards, leaving her "confused" and believing that he sees what they did as a transaction. Chloe is also concerned about Pierce's feelings for her. Pengilly commented, "Initially Chloe does really like Pierce and she initiates taking the relationship further, but she's not up for anything serious or long term which she's quite clear about, and he agrees." Pierce is also brought into Terese Willis's (Rebekah Elmaloglou) attempted takeover of Lassiters, although it is clear that he is only interested in Chloe and not the hotel. He later presents Chloe with a ring, leaving her feeling "increasingly overwhelmed". Pierce soon insists that Chloe accompany him on a business trip to a ski resort. Pengilly told Sarah Ellis of Inside Soap that Chloe is surprised by his offer, as she has just told him she is uncomfortable at how their relationship has been progressing. Chloe accepts the invitation, as she thinks the hotel's future depends on her keeping him happy.

Speaking to the Metro's Katie Baillie, Pengilly said Chloe "doesn't want to jeopardise the deal he's made with Terese, so she gets coerced into going along. She believes she can get him to finalise the deal while they're away and then it'll be over, but he's not interested in doing business. Chloe feels trapped and isn't sure what to do." Pengilly believed that Pierce has "completely fallen" for Chloe and she reckoned that Pierce was used to getting what he wants, so would not be "familiar with rejection!" Chloe tries to get Pierce to finalise the Lassiters deal during the trip, but Pierce refuses to do business once they reach the resort. In an attempt to put him off pursuing a long-term relationship with her, Chloe tells Pierce that she has Huntington's disease, but he vows to care for her as her condition worsens. Pengilly said Chloe is left feeling "very helpless and overwhelmed" by Pierce's declaration, which leads her to flee their cabin in the middle of the night. Pierce's guest stint concludes with him pulling out of the deal with Terese, after he Paul threatens to out Pierce's relationship with Chloe to his investors. Terese comes to Pierce's room and asks him what it would take for him to reconsider, suggesting that she is willing to have sex with him, but he turns her down and leaves Erinsborough. The character departed on 19 November 2018.

=== Reintroduction ===
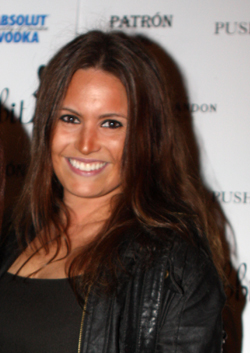
Christie Hayes (pictured) joined the cast as Pierce's fiancée, Ebony Buttrose.

On 14 February 2019, Robards confirmed that he would be reprising his role and joining the main cast. He stated "I am super excited to be returning to Neighbours full time... it means I didn't totally crash and burn my first major acting role!" Robards admitted that commuting to Melbourne from Sydney every week would not be easy, but he had the full support of his wife. Actress Christie Hayes also joined the show as Pierce's fiancée, Ebony Buttrose, who becomes involved in a "complex" love triangle with him and Chloe. Pierce returns during the episode broadcast on 21 May 2019.

Claire Crick of What's on TV observed that Chloe thinks Pierce is back for her, but is left "surprised – and a little miffed" when Pierce cuts their catch up short. During their next meeting, Chloe confides in Pierce about her brother's marital problems and the part she played, but instead of taking advantage of her "vulnerability", he just gives her advice. Crick dubbed his actions "mysterious" as she questioned what he was really doing back in town, if it was not to reconcile with Chloe. On-screen, Chloe continues to believe that Pierce still has feelings for her and ends up kissing him just as his fiancée Ebony walks in on them. Robards told TV Week's Maddison Hockey that Pierce "shuts it down" and Chloe leaves, as Ebony asks for an explanation. Robards continued: "The kiss throws him, but only a little bit. He's in love with Ebony, [so] he's convinced himself of that and that's all that matters." Hayes hoped viewers would like the relationship between Pierce and Ebony, as she believed there was "a lot of love there." She also said Ebony is "not a fan" of Chloe and is insecure about Chloe's past relationship with Pierce.

Hayes told Sarah Ellis of Inside Soap that Chloe is right to be suspicious of Ebony, but "things might not be what they seem. It later emerges that Ebony has been using Pierce's money to help support her sister, and Pierce is "hurt" by the revelation. The development leads to the end of Hayes' guest stint, as Ebony leaves town, having grown increasingly insecure about Chloe and Pierce's closeness. Robards later confirmed that Pierce still had feelings for Chloe, but she soon enters into a relationship with Elly Conway (Jodi Anasta). Robards described Chloe as "a very up and down girl, and she can bounce from one person to another". He thought Pierce was scared of that part of her personality, explaining "He's admitted that he likes her, but he still doesn't know if she can be trusted. I also think that, potentially, Chloe goes for people who she knows there may not be a future with. It's a safety net to her that it probably won't be long-term. Chloe's going through a hard time with her Huntington's diagnosis and it's almost like self-sabotage." Robards felt that he learned a lot from Pengilly during their scenes together, and added "My character is older, and in some ways he's Mr Sensible – Chloe's more free-spirited, and that's the case with April too."

Pierce and Chloe eventually reconcile, and producers established a new family unit with the introduction of Pierce's son Hendrix Greyson, played by Benny Turland. Hendrix's arrival led to exploration of Pierce's fictional backstory, as it emerges that Pierce also has a daughter. He has been estranged from his children for some time, having had little involvement in their upbringing, which their mother requested. Digitial Spy's Daniel Kilkelly stated "Pierce now regrets this and knows it was a mistake, as he's ashamed to have been an absent father." Pierce initially struggles with Hendrix's resentment and bad attitude, as well his romantic advances towards Chloe.

=== Marriage to Chloe Brennan ===
Pierce and Chloe get engaged in scenes set at the 2019 Melbourne Cup. Ahead of the event, the pair are unaware that they each plan to propose. Australian illusionist Cosentino makes a cameo appearance as he produces the ring Pierce is going to propose with. Chloe also asks Pierce to marry her, leading What's on TV's Claire Crick to dub the moment "a proposal with a difference". The engagement is marred by Hendrix's bad reaction to the news, as Pierce did not tell him of his plans beforehand, and because of his feelings for Chloe. In the lead up to the wedding, Hendrix kisses Chloe and then moves out to live with Karl Kennedy (Alan Fletcher) and Susan Kennedy (Jackie Woodburne). He then attempts to flee town on the day of the ceremony using Pierce's credit card to buy a ticket to Sydney. Pengilly explained that Chloe worries the wedding will not go ahead, saying "She wants it to be a special day for Pierce, and she knows it won't be right if Hendrix isn't there. She's really frustrated that he chose to run away on this very important day – however, she does understand where he's coming from."

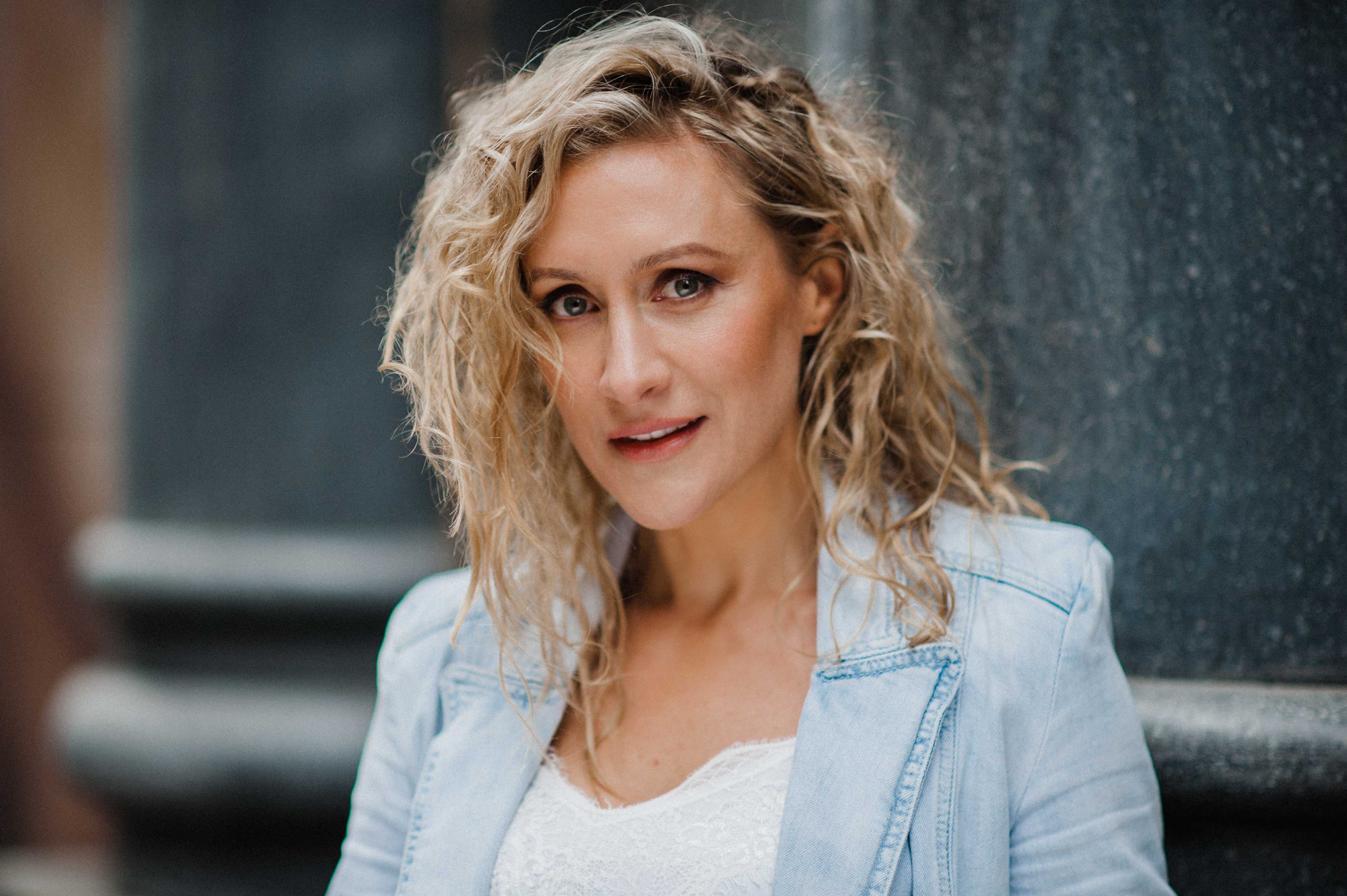
The introduction of Pierce's former partner Lisa, played by Jane Allsop (pictured), tests Pierce and Chloe's marriage.

Pierce goes after Hendrix to persuade him to stay in town and attend the wedding, as he feels he cannot get married without his son there. The pair eventually turn up at the venue and Pierce and Chloe marry. Pengilly said Chloe is relieved when she and Pierce are pronounced husband and wife, and she told Sarah Ellis of Inside Soap that with her Huntington's diagnosis and her mother's own battle with the condition, Pierce "feels like a reliable anchor" for Chloe. The wedding scenes were filmed on location at a winery. When asked if Chloe and Pierce's marriage would last the distance, Pengilly said "How often does any couple in Neighbours go the distance? There's always a lot of drama! I think that Pierce is good for Chloe during this stressful time in her life – but who knows what will happen?"

In January 2020, Hendrix's mother Lisa Rowsthorn (Jane Allsop) was introduced, continuing the exploration of the Greyson family's backstory and testing Pierce's marriage. Lisa comes to Erinsborough after Chloe attempts to reconcile Pierce and Hendrix, after Karl tells the couple that Hendrix wants to stay with him and Susan. When Pierce expresses his regret at not being there for Hendrix when he was younger, he ends up telling Chloe that he was a sperm donor for Lisa and agreed to keep his distance from her and their children. The revelation surprises Chloe, and Pengilly commented "She tries not to judge, but it's not the situation Pierce had her believe." A writer for TV Soap observed that Pierce is "on edge" because of Lisa's presence, as he fears that she will tear apart his fragile relationship with his son. After seeing Pierce and Hendrix call a truce, Lisa asks Pierce to father another child with her. He initially considers the idea, leaving Chloe to worry that their marriage will be "undermined". Of Pierce's dilemma, the TV Soap writer stated "In turmoil over all the complications that could arise, Pierce can't decide what to do; he'd love another baby but doesn't want it to cost him his new marriage to Chloe." Ultimately, Pierce turns Lisa down, as Chloe wants to reassess her decision not to have children due to her Huntington's.

The return of Naomi Canning (Morgana O'Reilly) in May 2020 saw writers establish a connection between her and Pierce. O'Reilly said the pair have "a shared wild past of Sydney's high-flying night life!" Naomi reveals further details of her backstory with Pierce to her nephew Kyle Canning (Chris Milligan). She explains that they shared an "intense passion" and Pierce wanted a relationship with her, but nothing ever happened. O'Reilly said that for Naomi, seeing Pierce again makes her question whether she chose the right man all those years ago. Naomi secures a job working alongside Chloe at Lassiters Hotel and is initially unaware that Chloe and Pierce are married. After learning the truth, Naomi vows not to pursue him, but she eventually admits to Pierce that she is attracted to him. A TV Soap writer observed that Pierce is "naturally shocked", but decides to put her confession behind them when Naomi assures him her feelings are not serious. However, Paul notices the connection between the pair and uses it to cause trouble for Pierce by telling Chloe about his history with Naomi. Naomi's presence later exposes further issues in Pierce and Chloe's marriage. After a misunderstanding over a threesome with Naomi, the couple realise they have communication issues. At a Lassiters Pride event, where Courtney Act makes a joke about the same subject, Chloe also realises that Pierce does not fully understand her bisexuality and she is left wondering if they rushed into marriage.

Shortly after, writers scripted a surprise pregnancy for the couple. Pengilly explained that for her character, the pregnancy brings "instant fear and terror" because of her Huntington's and whether she will pass on the condition to the baby. Pengilly also said that Chloe is also not sure she wants children, while she knows that Pierce will be "really excited". Chloe initially keeps her pregnancy from Pierce, as she deals with her feelings about it, but Paul finds out the news first. Pengilly acknowledged that while it was not Chloe's fault, Pierce is not happy that his business rival knew about the pregnancy first. Of Pierce's feelings towards the pregnancy, Robards told Sarah Ellis of Inside Soap: "Pierce has wanted another child for a while. He missed out on being there for Hendrix and Alana, and now that he's found Chloe, he wants to experience being a good father." As the couple wait for the results of a test which will tell them whether their baby will inherit the Huntington's gene, Robards said Pierce is more optimistic about the test, whereas Chloe is "concerned" and thinking about whether she will be around for their child. Robards hoped that his experience at being a first time father-to-be helped his performance during the storyline, saying "Going through this personally has helped with my work. Hopefully my excitement is shining through on screen!"

Pierce also clashes with live-in nurse Nicolette Stone (Charlotte Chimes), who is caring for Chloe's mother, Fay Brennan (Zoe Bertram). The pair's "bickering" comes to a climax when Nicolette plays "a cruel trick" on Pierce. Hendrix also learns that she has a crush on Chloe, leading Ellis to remark that Pierce appears to have more heartache on the way. Robards acknowledged his character's issues with his wife's bisexuality, saying "Pierce is confident comparing himself to men, but insecure about other women. He'd feel threatened if he knew about Nicolette's infatuation. There are already cracks in Pierce and Chloe's marriage that they're trying to cover up." Pierce and Chloe later learn their baby's HD markers are low. Pengilly said the results are a relief to Chloe, but she continues to worry about whether she wants to become a mother or start a family with Pierce, because they have had "a tumultuous few months". After Pierce suggests that they move away from Ramsay Street, Chloe goes for a walk with Nicolette to discuss her feelings about the pregnancy. After Nicolette leaves, Chloe starts having pains and collapses.

Chloe has a miscarriage, which leaves Pierce heartbroken and the couple's marriage in trouble. Robards admitted that the storyline was "a hard one to film" as he had been unable to see his pregnant wife for a number of weeks. He told Joe Julians of the Radio Times: "Having to go through a miscarriage story when I can't go home to my wife, and to make sure everything is OK – it was a tough time personally." In the wake of the miscarriage, Pierce and Chloe's relationship is strained. Robards pointed out that his character had really wanted the baby and the couple are both heartbroken, but Pierce is also aware that Chloe was talking to Nicolette about her feelings, which causes them to struggle to work through their issues together. Pierce also blames Nicolette for being out with Chloe before she lost the baby, something that he had asked them not to do. Robards added "Pierce feels like he is left behind and not being considered – while trying to be the rock. Nobody is asking how he feels and all the loss and grief, he's holding that in and it eventually explodes."

=== Affair with Dipi Rebecchi ===
Writers then plotted an infidelity storyline for Pierce. Robards confirmed that the actors had known that an affair storyline was being plotted for some time, but they only learned "week to week" how it would evolve. Robards was adamant that the story build up slowly, as his character "is a man of integrity", and he does not rush into things because he wants to set a good example to Hendrix. The actor also wanted to make sure the story "felt right" for what his character would do and justify how quickly it happens after the miscarriage. Speaking to Joe Julians of the Radio Times, Robards explained that Pierce has noticed the cracks in his marriage and he initially believes that he just needs to "work harder", which includes making a number of romantic gestures such as naming a bottle of wine after Chloe. However, Robards thought the couple were "so out of synch" and that Chloe had "checked out" of the marriage. As his relationship with Chloe remains strained, Pierce comes to rely on his friendship with Dipi Rebecchi (Sharon Johal). They confide in one another about their problems at home, as Dipi is struggling with her husband, Shane Rebecchi's (Nicholas Coghlan) drug addiction. Robards compared Pierce and Dipi's friendship to Chloe's friendship with Nicolette. He explained that Chloe is drawn to Nicolette, but not necessarily in a romantic way, and Nicolette "gets her", while he receives the same thing from Dipi. She is the only person who asks him how he is feeling and, unlike Chloe, she opens up to him about her problems. The pair develop a trust and allow themselves to be "vulnerable" with each other. Robards did not think Pierce was used to that in his life.

Pierce "makes a desperate attempt" to help his marriage by attending Dipi's cooking class with Chloe in a bid to reconnect, however, they do not work well together. Robards stated: "Pierce is really trying with Chloe, but you can just see that they're not in sync. From Pierce's point of view, he feels as if Chloe is just making things hard at the class – while Chloe feels that Pierce is being very controlling." After the class, Pierce intervenes when he sees Shane constantly interrupting Dipi. Robards said Pierce has become protective towards Dipi, who he knows is trying to care for her family and improve their financial situation, and he feels that Shane has let them all down. Robards told Penwill that Pierce ends up "lashing out" at Shane and they almost get into a fight. Pierce and Dipi later share a kiss as they talk through their family problems. Robards described Pierce as feeling "very lost" at that moment and the kiss takes him by surprise. He thought that Pierce was subconsciously drawn to Dipi, as he was getting more out of their friendship than his relationship at home. Robards told Penwill that the script for the scene said Dipi initiates 90% of the kiss, but he was unsure if it came across that way. Due to COVID-19 restrictions and social distancing rules on set, Johal's husband Ankur Dogra was employed for the kissing scene between Dipi and Pierce. Dogra was filmed from behind, so viewers only see the back of his head in the moment. Both Pierce and Dipi feel "horrified" by the kiss and know that it should not happen again. Robards commented that Pierce struggles when he goes home to Chloe, as he now realises he is attracted to Dipi. Robards continued "I guess he's been so shut out by Chloe, he's longing for someone who understands him. He feels so at ease with Dipi."

A couple of weeks after the kiss, Pierce and Dipi spend the night together. The development comes after Chloe rejects a diamond necklace that Pierce has bought to show her his love. He then invites Dipi to his hotel room to try it on, and when Dipi unbuttons her top to see the necklace better, Pierce calls her breath-taking and they end up having sex. Johal said Dipi feels guilty immediately, but she also feels relief and tells Pierce that it has made her want to be with Shane even more. Johal believed that Dipi could end up falling for Pierce, saying "Dipi sees Pierce as an equal – he handles himself, he's logical and successful." She thought Pierce had shown that he can look after himself and was the opposite of Shane. Robards likened Dipi to a drug addiction for Pierce, as she is helping to fill a hole in his life. He said that Pierce initially believes their night together is a one off, and that they will both go home and work on their marriages. Pierce struggles to win Chloe over with further romantic gestures and he realises he still has feelings for Dipi. Robards told Julians: "It's giving him a connection with someone that he hasn't had for a long time in that way. He isn't feeling any love from anyone, and Dipi and Pierce kind of give that to each other. Maybe Dipi is a little more into it than Pierce is, He doesn't want to deal with what would happen if he loses his marriage. Everything he has worked so hard for would be gone."

Pierce and Dipi's affair is discovered by Paul Robinson, who sees them together in the hotel office. Dennis described the moment as "a real win for Paul" because he finally has something on his business rival. He also said that Paul sees this as the time to regain his hold on Lassiters, so he gives Pierce an ultimatum – sell his share of the hotel back to Paul or he will tell Chloe about the affair. This causes a big argument between them, which Chloe walks in on. Dennis explained: "Paul has Pierce in a corner, and tempers flare. However, Paul knows he has the upper hand. It would destroy Chloe if she found out what her husband has been up to, and Paul plays on that." The affair is later exposed by Nicolette, who allows Chloe to walk in on Pierce and Dipi in a hotel room. While Dipi goes home to tell Shane what has happened, Pierce tries to explain everything to Chloe. He is "rattled" when he notices that she has turned to Nicolette for support and even comes to her defence.

=== Recast and departure ===
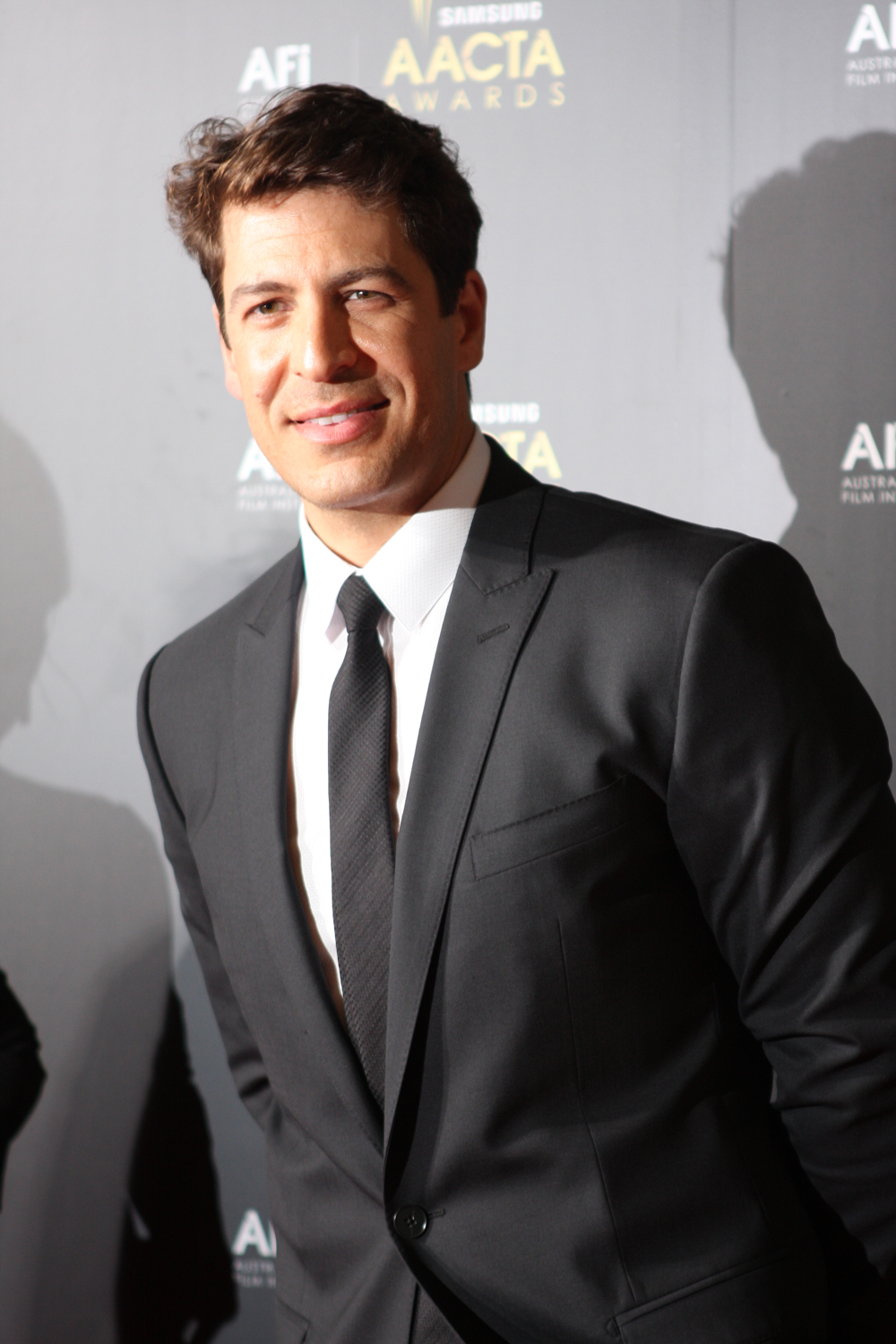
When Robards was forced to finish filming early, the role was recast to Don Hany (pictured) for Pierce's final weeks on-screen.

In August 2020, it was announced that the character would be leaving the show. Robards was originally due to film his final scenes in September, however, he chose to finish up four weeks early amidst the COVID-19 pandemic, so he could return to Sydney to be with his wife, who was expecting their first child. Robards stated "I made the gut-wrenching decision to depart Neighbours early, as my responsibilities as a husband and father have to take precedence." In an interview prior to his departure announcement, Robards admitted that he found the separation from his pregnant wife "very tough". He and his wife live in New South Wales and Robards commuted to Melbourne every week, but the travel restrictions meant he had to stay in Melbourne. Robards later called the decision to leave Neighbours "one of the most stressful times in my life", as he felt that he would be letting down the show and the viewers. The COVID lockdown restrictions in the state of Victoria meant that Robards would have to isolate in a hotel for two weeks after he finishing filming. He told TV Week's Maddison Hockey that he had "about a month to go" with the show, which would have been close to his wife's due date. He said "I didn't want to risk not being there for the birth of my child. And also, that would mean at least six weeks away from Anna again, not being able to support her, it just didn't feel right."

The role of Pierce was recast to Don Hany, who said "I'm thrilled to have been invited to be part of a show that is part of Australian television history. I've never done the show before so it's all new, and I'm so happy to be here. It's a testament to the resilience of the show that it's still running at a time like this." Hany admitted to being surprised by how close the cast is to each other and thought they were more like a family than some productions he had worked on. He explained to Ellis (Inside Soap) that it was "awesome" taking over the role of Pierce, as he felt that Robards had done all of the work for him and he was just "walking into his life for a month", as all of the character's relationships were established and the storyline was already mapped out. Hany told Ellis that Robards had given him the backstory he had created for Pierce. He also explained to Hany how Pierce had got to where he had, the reasons why Pierce marriage to Chloe was falling apart, as well as the love Pierce has for his wife. Johal's husband Ankur Dogra continued to take over the kissing scenes between Johal and Hany's characters. Hany commented "I've always said acting is a strange job – and it's even stranger now, emulating intimacy while being super-aware of working hard to keep the safety measures in place." Some Neighbours fans questioned why Pierce was not written out earlier, but in an interview with Daniel Kilkelly of Digital Spy, Robards explained that every script and episode would have to be rewritten, so recasting affected less people.

Robards' final episode aired on 19 October, with Hany's first episode airing four days later on 23 October. Hany also replaced Robards in the opening credits, as part of a newly filmed sequence alongside Pengilly and Turland. Hany took over the end of Pierce's affair storyline and subsequent exit, which aired on 27 November 2020 and sees Pierce leave Erinsborough after realising he has no good reason to stay. The "spark" between Dipi and Pierce goes once their affair is revealed, however, Dipi still suggests they start a proper relationship. Johal told TV Week's Amy Hadley that Dipi saw Pierce as the man she should have married and has imagined what their life together would look like, adding "It felt completely mutual and reciprocated, so when Pierce says it's all too hard, she's devastated and completely lost." Both Chloe and Pierce accept their marriage is over. Pengilly said Chloe feels "overwhelmed" by everything, so when Pierce announces he is leaving town, she is not sure how to feel, but she knows that not having to see Pierce constantly would be good for her. Pierce later fails to convince Hendrix to move to Sydney with him. When he and Chloe say their goodbyes, Pierce gives her "a caution" about Nicolette.

=== Returns ===
On 24 May 2021, it was confirmed that Hany had reprised the role, as the character made a "surprise return" to the show. His scenes began airing from 2 June. Hany compared his return to "putting on a pair of old socks", and he felt lucky to be able to come back to a familiar role almost immediately. Hany said Pierce returns with good intentions. He wants to check on his son and also finalise a business deal. He told TV Week's Maddison Hockey: "He's a bit curious about what's going on with Chloe, but I think he really wants to know, how things have progressed with his son." Pierce learns Chloe is now in a relationship with Nicolette and that Nicolette was responsible for his affair with Dipi being exposed. He also learns that they are living together in his old house with Chloe's mother, which is "just a little bit much for him." Hany explained Pierce's reaction: "Pierce can't help but feel hurt, but also concerned for Chloe. He's worried that she's hurried into the relationship. Also, he doesn't trust Nicolette. Nicolette is untrustworthy. She's had it in for Pierce and this is proof. He gives her some hard truths about her relationship and tells her it won't last." Chimes said that this provokes Nicolette, which leads her to lash out at him and say "some inaccurate things." Chloe ends up caught in the middle of her former husband and girlfriend. While Pierce's return is brief, Hany noted that there were some storylines that may lead producers to bring him back in the future. Hany commented "There are a few irons in the fire on this next development; I think it's pretty exciting."

On 8 March 2022, Kilkelly (Digital Spy) confirmed the character would be returning in June for a storyline set and filmed in Sydney, with Robards reprising the role. Jane Allsop also reprised her role as Lisa Rowsthorn. Kilkelly said the returns were for a big storyline involving Hendrix and his girlfriend Mackenzie Hargreaves (Georgie Stone). Robards said it was an honour to reprise the role and return before Neighbours aired its finale. Of his feelings about returning, Robards stated "I'm beyond excited and grateful to get back and see the whole team whom I never got to say goodbye to. Now knowing the show is coming to an end, it's such a privilege to be a part of it one last time." Further details of Pierce's return revealed that his appearance was tied into Hendrix's pulmonary fibrosis storyline. Pierce and Lisa's daughter Alana Greyson (Molly Broadstock) also made her debut in the Sydney episodes. Hendrix and Mackenzie visit his family while they are in Sydney and Hendrix reveals his diagnosis to them. Turland was pleased that Robards reprised the role, pointing out that he started the show with him and they had formed a good friendship. He also explained that Hendrix feels guilty that he has not seen his family in a long time and described the scenes as "confronting". He added that the whole family "need to get their heads around it; but both his parents want to help."

Pierce later attends Hendrix and Mackenzie's wedding, but his rivalry with Mackenzie's father Grant Hargreaves (Paul Mercurio) threatens to overshadow the day. Stone explained "There's a very interesting dynamic with the families. One one end of the spectrum, there's Hendrix's dad Pierce – who is a billionaire, and is used to getting what he wants. And then there's Mackenzie's dad, Grant, a working-class man who comes from a country town. The drama that comes with their different lifestyles ends up hijacking the day a bit..." The ceremony goes ahead without any issues, and following the wedding, Pierce tells the couple that he is gifting them a mortgage-free apartment in Sydney, leading Stone to joke about feeling jealous of the gift. Not long after, Hendrix undergoes a lung transplant, but his body rejects the new lungs and he dies with his parents and Mackenzie by his side. Pierce's last appearance aired in June in the UK, as he attends Hendrix's memorial in Sydney with his family, the Kennedys, and Mackenzie.

== Reception ==
Before his introduction, Mat Whitehead of Ten Daily thought Pierce was "exactly the sort of name you'd expect for someone who is as handsome as he may be mysterious", adding that Robards looked set to "arrive in style." Hayley for Nova was critical of the character's promotional trailer, calling it "a bit cringeworthy" and "sexy-but-kinda-weird". She also said that she was "tickled by the softly-lit campery of this promo" and thought Pierce was "a very porn-star-sounding character". The character received positive attention for his looks from a TV Week writer, who called him "a handsome stranger" whose arrival "sparks intrigue in Erinsborough". They also noted: "Nothing gets tongues wagging on Neighbours quite like the arrival of a hot new hunk." Inside Soap's Sarah Ellis branded Pierce a "suave businessman".

A writer for the Hit Network thought Robards' acting was "not too bad" and that his character was "clearly a mix between Pierce Brosnan (the suavest man on earth) and Christian Grey." Chloe and Pierce's romance was summed up in a press release announcing Robards' return to the role: "As most modern love stories and Taylor Swift ballads go, Pierce and Chloe's relationship got very messy and very complicated very quickly." The piece added that Pierce's return would be "far from red roses, boxed chocolates and singing telegrams." Tina Burke of TV Week said Pierce and Chloe relationship "proved to be as messy, complicated and fleeting as any good Neighbours romance." Burke also thought Pierce's return would "shake things up".

Robards' return as member of the main cast was criticised because of his lack of acting experience and his reality television background. His co-star, Christie Hayes came to his defence, saying that his lack of experience led to him being one of "the hardest-working ones on set." She also thought he was naturally talented and she enjoyed working with him on their storyline. Robards also addressed the criticism and said that he did not pay attention "to that kind of small thinking". He also pointed out that he had to audition for the role and went through the same process as everyone else.

Maureen Sugden of The Herald noted that the character's recast "drew ire" from viewers on social media. Claire Crick of What's on TV also commented on the reaction to the recast, observing that viewers were shocked when Hany made his debut as Pierce. She said "fans are struggling to get used to the sudden turnaround of actors." The truth about Pierce and Dipi's affair was part of "one of the biggest weeks of 2020 in Neighbours" according to the Radio Times's Johnathon Hughes. He called the affair "scandalous" and wrote: "After months of furtive looks, forbidden lust, hotel hook-ups and one major recast in the middle of it all, Pierce and Dipi's affair is out in the open – and life in Ramsay Street will never be the same again."
