= 10 (VoD service) =

Australian video on demand service

- Logo used since 2025
- Former names: Tenplay (2013–18); 10Play (2018–25)
- Website type: Video on demand; OTT; Catch up; live streaming
- Predecessor: ten.com.au
- Headquarters: Pyrmont, New South Wales, Australia
- Area served: Australia
- Owners: Warner Bros. Discovery Asia-Pacific (Skydance Corporation)
- Services: Streaming service
- Parent: Network Ten Pty Limited
- Website: 10.com.au
- Commercial: Yes
- Registration: Optional
- Users: 7 million (2023)
- Launched: 29 September 2013; 13 years ago
- Current status: Active

10 (formerly, and commonly referred to as Tenplay or 10Play) is an Australian free video on demand and catch-up TV service run by Network 10. The service became available on 29 September 2013, replacing the network's old website that offered limited catch-up TV services. 10 offers online live streaming of Channel 10, 10 Comedy, 10 Drama, and Nickelodeon, as well as live sport via 10 Sport.

10 is available across several platforms including Web, iOS and Android apps, FreeviewPlus certified TVs, Apple TV 4th Gen+, Fetch TV, Telstra TV, Chromecast, Android TV, Samsung TV, Sony Linux TV, Xbox One and Xbox Series X and Series S. As of September 2023, 10Play has over 7 million registered users.

== History ==
=== 2013–2025: Tenplay/10Play ===
On 29 September 2013, as a part of its online entertainment brand Tenplay, an online video on demand catch-up TV service for Network Ten, incorporating locally produced programs from Ten, Eleven and One along with back-catalogue content from local and international distributors. Tenplay became the third catch-up TV service released by a commercial Australian network, the first being PLUS7 from Yahoo7 and the Seven Network and the second being FIXPlay from Ninemsn and the Nine Network.

On 31 October 2018, the service was slightly renamed to 10Play as part of a larger rebranding of Network Ten.

=== 2025–present: 10 ===
In September 2024, it was announced that the 10Play branding would be dropped from the service, and that Network 10's linear and streaming services would be promoted together under the "10" branding. Network 10's head of creative Claudio Amati stated that the rebrand was modeled after a similar move announced by 10's British sister network 5 the prior month, with the call to action "watch and stream free". The rebrand took effect in June 2025 alongside a brand refresh by 10.

== Streaming ==
Live streaming of Network 10's primary channel commenced on 21 January 2016, although it was available only during selected hours. 24-hour live streaming of the main channel commenced on 26 January 2018. A live stream of 10 Bold was available on a part-time basis until 21 February 2019. On 21 February 2019, 10 Bold switched to a 24-hour live stream and 10 Peach was added to the 10Play live streaming service. On 27 September 2020, 10 Shake was added to the 10Play live streaming service. On 2 December 2022, 10Play launched free ad-supported streaming television (FAST) channels. On 31 August 2023, 51 Pluto TV FAST channels were added to the 10Play live streaming service.

== Content and programming ==
10 provides on-demand access to almost all the TV programs that are broadcast on Network 10 linear broadcast channels (Channel 10, 10 Comedy, 10 Drama and Nickelodeon).

Programs are categorised by these genres:

- Adventure
- Comedy
- Crime
- Documentary
- Drama
- Kids
- Lifestyle
- Light Entertainment
- Movies
- News
- Reality
- Sport
- Thriller

=== Programs ===
- After Paradise
- The Bold and the Beautiful Fast Tracked
- Days of Our Lives Fast Tracked
- The Caravan
- Darryl Beattie Adventures
- Dream Big
- I Kissed a Boy
- My Name is Captain Thunderbolt (Sometimes)
- Neighbours: Erinsborough High
- Neighbours Summer Stories
- Sidelines
- Terry's Talks
- NBL22: Next Level
- NBL23: Unrivalled
- TGB
- Round Ball Rules
- TL;DR
- To Kingdom Come
- United
- WOW – Women of Wrestling
- The Young and the Restless Fast Tracked

=== Live sports ===
- A-League Women (2021–present)
- Australia Cup (2021–present)
- Women's Australia Cup (2023–present)
- Bellator MMA (2021–present)
- Pararoos Internationals (2023–present)
- Roshn Saudi League (2022–present)
- National Basketball League (2021–present)

== Availability ==
Through the streaming platform, 10 provides live stream access to the whole Network 10 suite of channels, including the main and multi-channels.

=== Current Pluto TV FAST channels ===
As of 1 June 2025, the following online only channels are also available:

- Big Brother Live Feed
- Nickelodeon
- Nick Jr. Club
- TeenNick
- NickToons
- NickToons 90s
- Project Runway
- Sharks & Other Predators
- Have You Been Paying Attention?
- The Cheap Seats
- Hardcore Pawn
- 8 out of 10 Cats
- Adult Animation
- Undercover Boss
- Embarrassing Bodies
- Buzzfeed Food
- MTV Reality
- MTV The Shores
- MTV Ridiculousness
- MTV EMA
- South Park
- MasterChef
- Survivor
- Survivor US
- Haunt TV
- Nature Time
- True Stories
- Prisoner
- Puberty Blues
- Rush
- Xtream Adventure
- The Wicket Tuna Channel
- Movie Sphere
- Thriller Movies
- Medical Emergency
- Comedy Dynamics
- Crime Time
- Ghost Hunters
- Anthony Bourdain Parts Unknown
- COPS
- Judge Judy
- Becker
- Diagnosis: Murder
- Graham Norton
- Twilight Zone
- Good Chef Bad Chef
- SpongeBob SquarePants
- America's Next Top Model
- Australia's Next Top Model
- The Dog House
- 48 Hours

=== FAST Holiday channels only ===
- Halloween Movies (every October)
- Christmas Movies (every December)

=== Former FAST channels ===
- Action and Adventure (2022–23)
- Aussie Drama (2022–23)
- CSI
- Dora the Explorer (2024)
- Little Kids (2022–23)
- Retro Cartoons (2022–23)
- Romance Movies (2024)
- The Traitors (2023)
- True Stories (2022–23)
- The Challenge (2022–23)
- NickMovies (2023–24)
- MTV Best of
- MTV Dating
- MTV Life
- MTV Drama
- MTV EMA
- MTV Retro
- MTV Entertainment
- NickToons 00s
- NickRewind
- NickClassics
- MTV Biggest Pop
- MTV Love
- MTV On Tour!
- Realmadrid.tv
- Avatar: The Last Airbender
- B&B Classics
- Beverly Hills, 90210
- Dynasty
- Happy Days
- I Love Lucy
- Mission Impossible
- Hawaii Five-O
- Matlock
- NCIS
- Bondi Rescue
- I'm a Celebrity
- Bellator MMA
- Baywatch
- Merlin
- Gunsmoke
- Wipeout Xtra
- Brady Bunch
- Drew Barrymore
- Rugrats
- World of Football

== Logos ==
Tenplay Logo (29 September 2013 – 31 October 2018)

10Play logo (31 October 2018 – 30 June 2025)

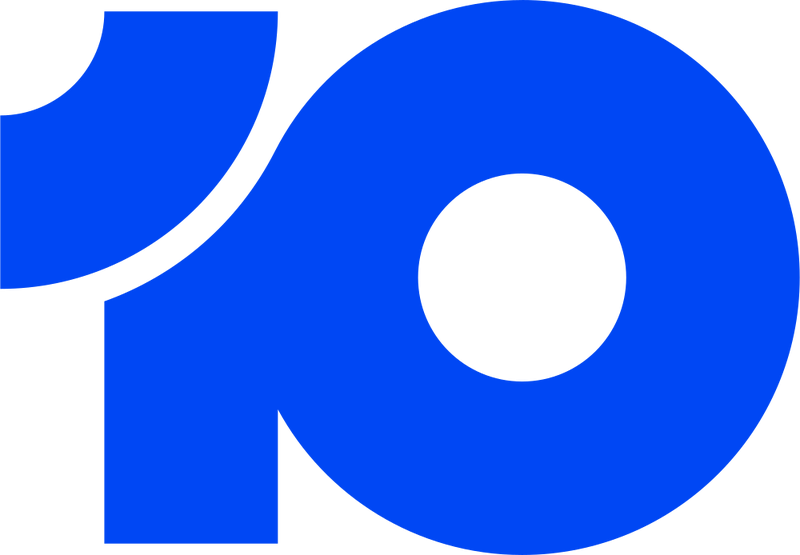
10 logo (30 June 2025 – present)

== See also ==
- Internet television in Australia
