= Erinsborough High Fire =

2015 Neighbours storyline

- Neighbours episodes
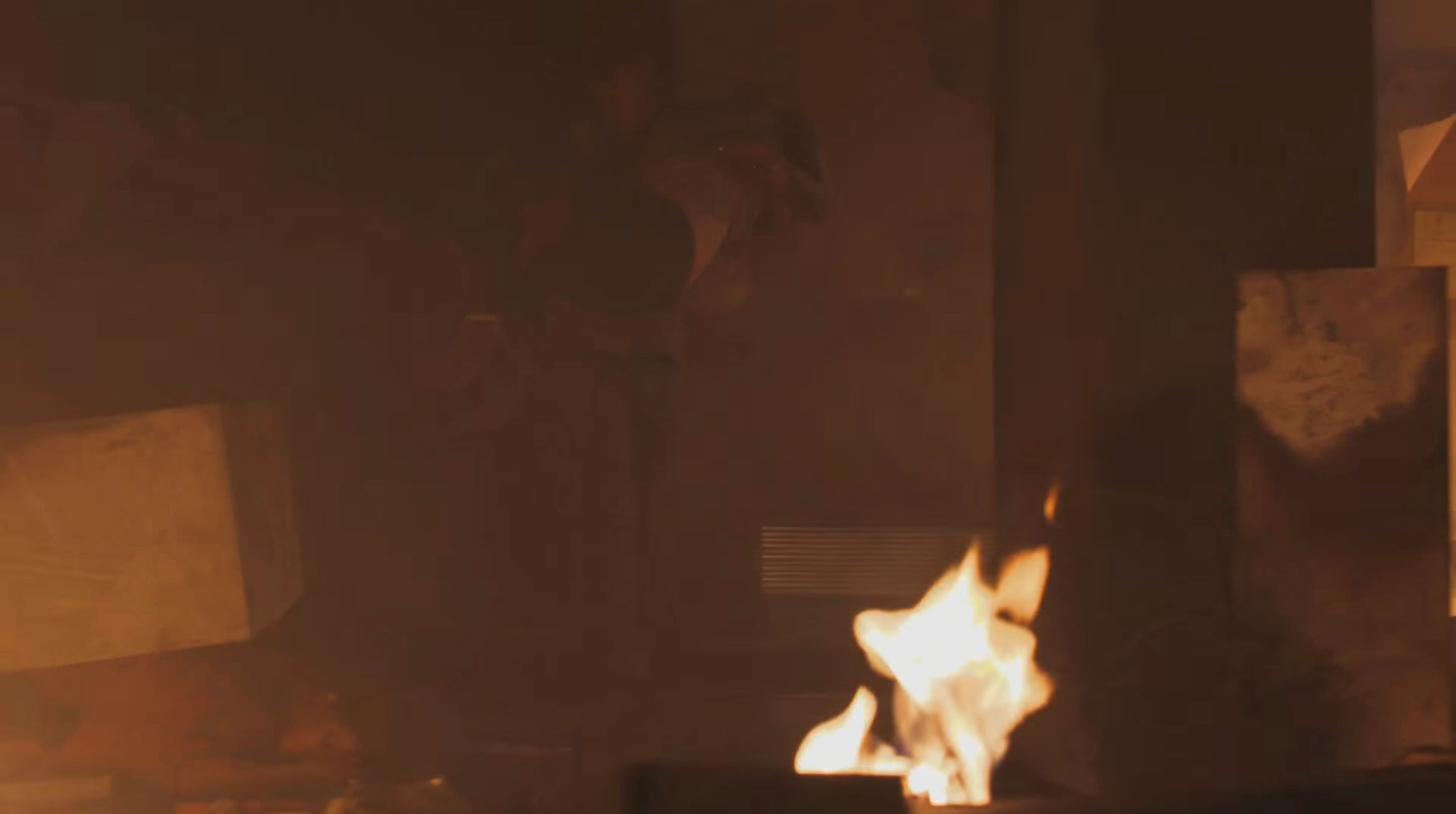
- During the Erinsborough High fire, Brad Willis (Kip Gamblin) chooses to save his lover, Lauren Turner (Kate Kendall), over his wife, Terese Willis (Rebekah Elmaloglou), climaxing a love triangle storyline.
- Episode nos.: Episodes 7237 and 7238
- Directed by: Tony Osicka
- Written by: Emma J. Steele, Alexa Wyatt
- Original air dates: 20 October 2015; 21 October 2015
- Running time: 42 minutes (2x21)

Guest appearances
- Felix Mallard as Ben Kirk; Ben Terrell as Fire Fighter Mitch

Episode chronology
| ← Previous "Episode 7236" | Next → "Episode 7239" |

The "Erinsborough High Fire" is a storyline from the Australian television soap opera Neighbours that ran on 20 and 21 October 2015, airing over episodes 7237 and 7238. These episodes were broadcast on 4 and 5 November 2015 in the United Kingdom. The storyline sees the fictional Erinsborough High School engulf in a deliberately-lit fire, which leads to a long arson mystery. Involving half the cast, the storyline was Neighbours' big stunt event of the year and came about when Paul Robinson (Stefan Dennis) sells the school to Eden Hills Grammar for it to be closed, causing the staff and the students to protest in a school sleep-out. Many characters' have their storylines climaxed whilst being trapped in the fire, including the love triangle between Brad Willis (Kip Gamblin), Lauren Turner (Kate Kendall) and Terese Willis (Rebekah Elmaloglou) when Brad chooses to save Lauren over Terese. Expecting mother Amber Turner (Jenna Rosenow) and Susan Kennedy (Jackie Woodburne) are trapped in a classroom during the fire when Amber goes into labour and the two are forced to decide whether to "fight or flight" in "genuinely frightening" scenes.

Another storyline is the near death of Toadie Rebecchi (Ryan Moloney), who is in a wheelchair and is saved by his wife, Sonya (Eve Morey). Morey was glad with the storyline as it involved Sonya saving Toadie instead of the other way around. Sheila Canning (Colette Mann) overhears Toadie yelling for help, but leaves him to save herself, which results in her being "riddled with guilt". Mann thought that Sheila's decision was a sensible one and she was glad to be involved in the storyline after being a minor figure in the Erinsborough tornado the previous year. Producers were wary of triggering Mann's asthma during the filming of the storyline and so used fire and smoke machines with vapour, rather than real smoke. Boom operators were also incorporated to capture enhanced audio and the cast was only given limited access to the machinery behind the cameras. Both Mann and Morey thought the set looked very realistic and felt as if they were in movie studios. Woodburne described the day of filming as very busy and explained that it was easy for her to know "what Susan would be feeling", especially due to her real-life experience as a volunteer cook for firemen. The storyline received positive attention from critics, who thought it was a step-up from the tornado plotline, although one outlet criticised it for its lack of realism.

== Plot ==
When the news that Eden Hills Grammar has bought Erinsborough High School and plans to close it down gets out, principal Susan Kennedy (Jackie Woodburne) and teacher Brad Willis (Kip Gamblin) brainstorm a school sleep-out to raise money and protest against the possible closure. Toadie Rebecchi (Ryan Moloney), Lauren Turner (Kate Kendall), Paige Smith (Olympia Valance), Tyler Brennan (Travis Burns) and Sheila Canning (Colette Mann) are enrolled as supervisors. Everyone is forced to evacuate when someone falsely pulls down the fire alarm. Piper Willis (Mavournee Hazel) and Ben Kirk (Felix Mallard) separate themselves from the sleep-out and explore the school. They start a small fire in Susan's office to set off the alarms, then put the fire out and walk off, but the fire reignites itself. Toadie, who is in a wheelchair from a previous accident, looks at old graffiti drawn by himself and Billy Kennedy (Jesse Spencer) when the fire alarms go off again. Toadie brushes it off as another false alarm, but then spots flames ascending towards him and, after dropping his phone, he lifts himself out of his wheelchair to escape down the stairs, his only exit route. Brad kisses Lauren in the school corridors and they are spotted by Brad's ex-wife, Terese Willis (Rebekah Elmaloglou). Lauren chases after an upset Terese and offers to escort Terese to the evacuation zone, but Terese says that she can go by herself. Susan and Amber Turner (Jenna Rosenow) are cooking burger patties in a classroom and assume the smoke from the stove has set off the alarms, however when they go outside, they notice flames blocking off every direction, so they seek refuge back in the classroom, where Amber's water then breaks.

Paige and Tyler are in the lift together when it stops and smoke begins entering through under the door. They try to escape, but only let more smoke in, so they sit on the floor at the back of the lift and cover their mouths. Terese struggles to find the exit and Lauren catches up to her to help, but an explosion knocks a cabinet over them and they lose consciousness. Outside, Kyle Canning (Chris Milligan) searches for Sheila, and Sonya Rebecchi (Eve Morey) worries for her husband, Toadie, who no one has seen. Piper and Ben make it out of the school and Karl Kennedy (Alan Fletcher) gives advice to Susan and Amber over the phone. Tyler confesses his love for Paige, then falls unconscious, before Mark Brennan (Scott McGregor) saves them. As Sheila is running through the corridors, she hears Toadie calling for help and alerts Sonya after escaping. Brad finds Lauren and Terese, and is left to choose who to save. He carries Lauren to the exit only for Terese to regain consciousness and watch. When Brad returns, Terese has already been rescued. Sonya struggles to pull Toadie to the exit and Stephanie Scully (Carla Bonner) helps her save him. Amber, who is now in labour, and Susan cover themselves in dampened towels and make their way out of the classroom, when the firefighters arrive and save them. In the aftermath, Amber gives birth to her daughter safely, while Terese is treated for four-degree burns and expresses her anger towards Brad for saving Lauren instead of her. Sheila begins helping the Rebecchis out of guilt for not saving Toadie herself, while the school is not sold to Eden Hills Grammar. Steph, Aaron Brennan (Matt Wilson), Jayden Warley (Khan Oxenham) and Sue Parker (Kate Gorman) are all accused of starting the fire, but Ben and Piper eventually confess to the police after making a failed attempt to run away.

== Regular cast appearances ==
- Ryan Moloney as Toadie Rebecchi
- Eve Morey as Sonya Rebecchi
- Rebekah Elmaloglou as Terese Willis
- Kip Gamblin as Brad Willis
- Kate Kendall as Lauren Turner
- Olympia Valance as Paige Smith
- Jenna Rosenow as Amber Turner
- Ariel Kaplan as Imogen Willis
- Mavournee Hazel as Piper Willis
- Harley Bonner as Josh Willis
- Chris Milligan as Kyle Canning
- Carla Bonner as Stephanie Scully
- Colette Mann as Sheila Canning
- Scott McGregor as Mark Brennan
- Travis Burns as Tyler Brennan
- Jackie Woodburne as Susan Kennedy
- Alan Fletcher as Karl Kennedy

== Production ==
=== Development ===
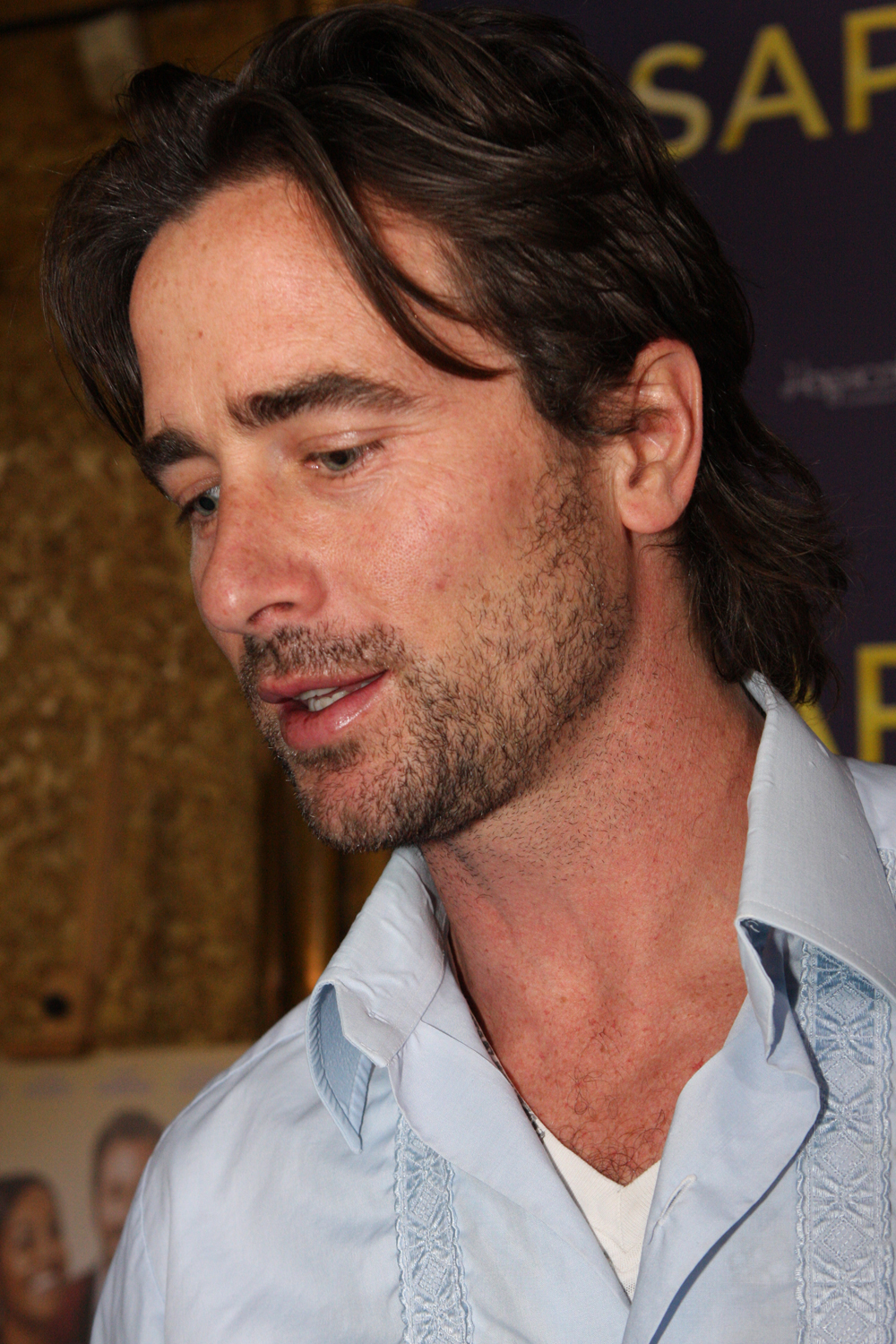
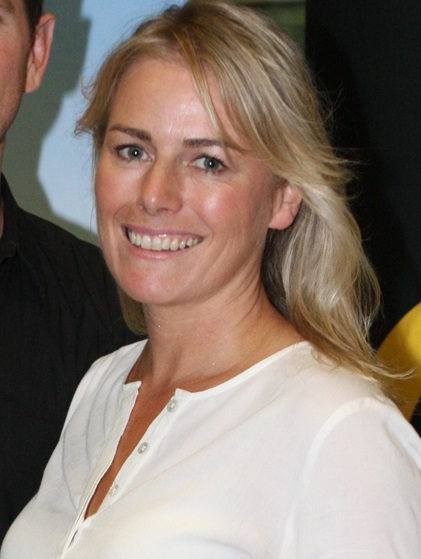
Brad Willis and Lauren Turner, played by Kip Gamblin (left) and Kate Kendall (right), were central figures of a love triangle storyline during the fire.

Neighbours first teased the storyline through trailers on television and their YouTube channels. The storyline was established as one of the major plotlines of 2015. It sees a number of Ramsay Street residents get caught in a fire at Erinsborough High during a "fundraising drive" sleepout to stop the closure of the school. The "dreadful" mayor, Paul Robinson (Dennis), is behind the closure of the school, causing a disliking for Paul amongst many people, including Erinsborough High's principal, Susan Kennedy (Woodburne). Woodburne said of their relationship with each other, "I enjoy the relationship that Paul and Susan have; they have a mutual respect for each other. They're very very different and Susan can see him for the scammer he is but she’s also seen the vulnerable side of him. I think that side of him is the one she connects to."

Toadie Rebecchi (Moloney), who is a wheelchair user, becomes trapped in the fire. He becomes stuck upon being forced to lift himself out of his wheelchair to escape down the stairwell. His wife, Sonya (Morey), rescues him with the help of Stephanie Scully (Bonner), who has just returned to Erinsborough. Morey said that she was "pretty excited" when she learned that she would be saving Toadie instead of him saving her as he has in the past. Morey explained that Sonya arrives at the school during the fire, but struggles to find Toadie, "so she just runs off screaming". Morey explained that when Sonya finds Toadie, she struggles to pull him out of the fire "due to his weight and the smoke". Morey said it was "really cool" to do work on the fire as it differed to regular work on the serial.

Sonya is alerted of Toadie's location when Sheila Canning (Mann), a supervisor for the sleepout, tells her that she heard someone shouting out from down the corridor. Sheila makes a "very pathetic attempt" to help the person shouting for help, before abandoning them to save herself, which Mann described as "quite a sensible thing to do!" She begins feeling "riddled with guilt" for leaving, especially when she discovers that it is Toadie who was trapped, so she "does a whole bunch of really nice stuff for the Rebecchis". Sheila babysits their daughter, Nell (Scarlett Anderson), helps at Sonya's Nursery and helps Toadie book his appointments to repay them for leaving him, which the Rebecchis remain unaware of. Morey explained prior to the broadcast of the fire in the United Kingdom that she had yet to film scenes where Sheila gives an explanation for all the extra help she has been offering. Mann was "very pleased" to be incorporated into the storyline as she felt that she had "completely missed" 2014's tornado plot. She also laughed at the fact that she has asthma and her character would be in a fire.

Another plot that climaxes during the fire is the premature birth of Amber Turner's (Rosenow) congenital diaphragmatic herniac daughter, Matilda (Eloise Simbert). Amber goes into labour while trapped in a room with Susan. Whilst speaking to Tenplay, Woodburne explained that Susan manages to stay calm during the "life or death situation" as she is "motivated" to bring Amber to safety. She described it as overriding Susan's own panic and she called Susan "very frightened". She stated that for Susan, the situation is "unlike anything she has ever experienced before". Susan and Amber are forced to decide whether to "fight or flight", with Woodburne saying, that "they both stay in the room and definitely die or they go through the flames and possibly have a chance." Woodburne believed that Susan and Amber were "at the peak of fear anticipating that escape" and thought that their decision to leave was driven by Susan's love for her own children and grandchildren. As they are about to escape, the firefighters arrive and rescue them. The occasion marked the second fire Susan has been in.

The love triangle storyline between Brad Willis (Gamblin), Terese Willis (Elmaloglou) and Lauren Turner (Kendall) peaks when Brad is forced to make a "terrible decision" on whether to save either Terese, his recently separated wife, or Lauren, the "love of his life" who he "adores". Gamblin teased the plot in a behind-the-scenes video. Fletcher thought that Terese was undeserving of Brad's actions. Paige Smith (Valance) and Tyler Brennan (Burns) are also "at the centre of the drama" upon getting trapped in the lift, resulting in Tyler falling unconscious. The culprit behind the fire is left unknown at the end of episode 7238 and when asked whether viewers would find out the identity of the arsonist immediately afterwards, Mann replied, "Oh no, of course not. It just goes on and on for a while until we find out who did it." Aaron Brennan (Wilson), Jayden Warley (Oxenham), Sue Parker (Gorman) and Steph are all considered as suspects, the latter of whom is initially suspected by everyone as she is "randomly there at the school", which seems "weird". Piper Willis (Hazel) and Ben Kirk (Mallard) reveal themselves as the arsonists a month later after feeling a "tremendous amount of guilt".

=== Filming ===
Inside scenes of the storyline took a day to film, with the "sense of concentration on the set" being described as "really intense". Outside scenes were filmed a week prior. The make-up department padded down the actors with fake smoke before their scenes. Scenes set in school corridors were shot in old Network 10 tunnels, where Prisoner was filmed, which gave Mann "flashbacks". Various boom operators were used to capture audio, while smoke and fire machines were incorporated for realism. Mann recalled director Tony Osicka being very cautious of her asthma during the filming. All smoke machines used vapour instead of real smoke, which allowed Mann to not be affected, however made it so Mann had to pretend she could "see it all". During Mann's filming, the set was "flame-free and smoke-free" for most of the time and Mann said that doing stunts "was really fun to do" as big events on Neighbours do not occur often. She admitted to constantly asking the producers on how to act and she said of her acting, "I'd like to say it was real but it wasn't." Morey revealed that the cast was only given access to the special effects behind the camera at certain times. She said the set looked like an actual fire and said that it felt as though it were a movie set. She added of it, "It was also nice to be working on a different set, rather than just filming in our kitchen at home or the coffee shop." A scene involving an explosion that knocks out Terese and Lauren did not include any special effects and was all done in studio.

Woodburne described the day of shooting as "very intense" and explained to a writer on Tenplay that there were numerous scenes shot in a row, including scenes between Susan and Amber, which were all shot back-to-back. She also said that there were lots of flames, fire and smoke and added that it was easy for her as an actor to "feel what Susan would be feeling". Woodburne said the filming reminded her of when she volunteered as a cook for the firemen during the Black Saturday bushfires, which allowed her to understand how "catastrophic" fires can be. Woodburne claimed that filming big storylines is what keeps the cast and crew going, and was also reminded of a film set. She called the cast "very intense and dramatic" whilst focused on their own storylines. Due to the majority of Woodburne's fire scenes only being with Rosenow, the two were able to talk to each other about the plot and figure out how they wanted to act the story out, "moment by moment". She admitted to not understanding how the characters would be feeling until being in the studio and called it "the most enjoyable day". McGregor explained that there was "a bit of trouble" with the lift door that was required for scenes with Paige and Tyler, which delayed filming.

== Promotion and broadcast ==
Promotional trailers for the storyline were released in Australia in October 2015, online and on television. One trailer is centred around Brad, Terese and Lauren's love triangle storyline features footage of Brad looking around with voiceovers from the fire's two episodes playing in the background. Daniel Kilkelly of Digital Spy said that Brad would "have to choose between his estranged wife and his new partner" in the fire, while the serial additionally teased, "Brad puts his life on the line, but for who?" A second trailer featuring Morey's character looking around worriedly also premiered with voiceovers playing in the background and a statement from Neighbours said "Will Sonya risk her life in the fire?" The also serial branded the storyline as "unmissable" episodes. In another trailer aired on television in the week prior to the storyline's broadcast, the serial questioned on screens, "Who will be rescued?" Three behind the scenes videos were also released by Neighbours on their YouTube channel, with each video focusing on a different character's storyline. The behind the scenes videos feature Gamblin, Fletcher, Kendall, Burns, Valance, Morey and Milligan.

The storyline aired over two episodes. Episode 7237 aired on 20 October 2015 and episode 7238 was broadcast on 21 October 2015 on Channel Eleven in Australia, while the United Kingdom had the two episodes aired on 4 and 5 November 2015 due to a broadcasting delay on Channel 5 as compared to its Australian counterpart. Both episodes were then uploaded to YouTube.

== Reception ==
In the UK, the first episode of the storyline was watched by 900,000 people. The second episode was watched by 1.7 million people, tieing with Can't Pay? We'll Take It Away! as the most watched programme for the week. The second episode held a 17.7% share of total viewership and marked the highest ratings the serial had received in two years, which was called "impressive" by Kilkelly.

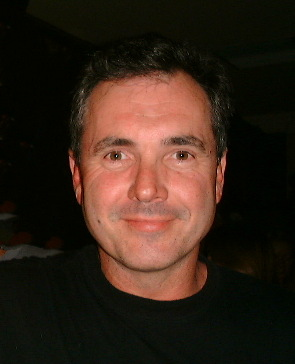
Alan Fletcher praised his co-stars for their acting.

Woodburne said of the plotline, "What I love about a story like this is it involves all the characters, all the stories interlock and interweave and everyone affects everyone else." Fletcher congratulated Woodburne and Rosenow on their performances, calling them "beautifully played". Kilkelly branded the fire by saying, "Who said life in Erinsborough was all sunshine and barbecues? Neighbours ramps up the drama in spectacular style next week as a fire is started at the local school, leaving a number of lives in jeopardy." He also questioned, "Can Neighbours' Rebecchi family ever catch a break? Just weeks after Toadie lost the use of his legs in a freak bouncy castle accident, there's another crisis next week." He quipped the storyline a "deadly" fire, and claimed it "gripped fans". The arson mystery and the suspicion of Steph was named "a gripping new storyline" by him. Victoria Wilson of What's on TV named Paul's efforts to shut down the school his ninth "worst" moment.

Ben Fenlon from the HuffPost said that viewers needed to suspend belief to watch the storyline and questioned why it took the firefighters so long to arrive, wondered why Brad was allowed to keep going in and out of the building and criticised the "tiny row of flames" that Susan and Amber were stuck behind. He further stated that getting over reality would enable viewers "some great drama to enjoy" and called the episode "fast paced". He thought the love triangle storyline "took an interesting turn when love-rat Brad had to choose who to save". Fenlon also critiqued the fact that Terese was rescued by "invisible firemen". He said that the scenes shared between Woodburne and Rosenow were "genuinely frightening" and called Woodburne's performance a "step up from the emergency tracheotomy she performed on Lou Carpenter during last year's tornado episodes." He thought that Sheila's actions were "the biggest surprise" of the storyline and branded them as "very unneighbourly". Before encouraging old viewers to return to watching the serial, he said that the storyline resulted in "so many questions, so much drama to come."
