= Episode 6646 (Neighbours) =

- Neighbours episode
- Episode no.: Episode 6646
- Directed by: Laurence Wilson
- Written by: Jason Herbison
- Original air date: 20 May 2013

Guest appearance
- Scott McGregor as Mark Brennan

Episode chronology
← Previous; Episode 6645	Next → Episode 6647

"Episode 6646", also known as "The Eclipse", is the 6646th episode of the Australian soap opera Neighbours. It premiered on Eleven on 20 May 2013. The episode was written by Jason Herbison and directed by Laurence Wilson. Episode 6646 revolves around an annular eclipse, which changes the lives of several Ramsay Street residents. It was first teased by executive producer Richard Jasek in January 2013. The episode saw several storylines play out with Kyle Canning (Chris Milligan) sustaining serious damage to his eyesight, a child kidnapping, the introduction of a new family and the return of two former characters; Mark Brennan (Scott McGregor) and Brad Willis (Kip Gamblin).

Two promotional trailers for the episode were released by Eleven and British broadcaster Channel 5 respectively. A real annular eclipse occurred in Australia ten days before the episode was broadcast. Episode 6646 was watched by 353,000 Australian viewers, which made it the top rated programme on the digital multichannels that day. In the UK, the episode was seen by 780,000 viewers during the first showing and 1.07 million viewers during the second. Television critics thought the episode was full of dramatic incidents, while others felt sorry for Kyle and agreed that Lucas and Vanessa's happiness had been short lived again.

== Plot ==
The episode opens one hour before the eclipse occurs. The Turner family are hosting a barbecue for their friends and neighbours in their backyard at Number 32. Toadfish Rebecchi (Ryan Moloney) and Karl Kennedy (Alan Fletcher) discuss Stephanie Scully's (Carla Bonner) state of mind after learning that she is off her medication. At Harold's Store, Paul Robinson (Stefan Dennis) reacquaints himself with his former neighbour Brad Willis (Kip Gamblin), who has moved back to Erinsborough with his wife and two children. During the eclipse, Lucas Fitzgerald (Scott Major) proposes again to Vanessa Villante (Alin Sumarwata), who accepts. When the sun comes back out, Lauren Turner (Kate Kendall) is surprised to see her first love, Brad, has moved onto Ramsay Street with his family. Bailey Turner (Calen Mackenzie) shares a moment with his best friend's girlfriend, Rani Kapoor (Coco Cherian), when she becomes upset.

At Number 26, Amber Turner (Jenna Rosenow) comes to watch the eclipse with her friend Chris Pappas (James Mason). She eventually apologises to Chris for developing feelings for him, despite knowing he is gay. While Kyle Canning (Chris Milligan) and Georgia Brooks (Saskia Hampele) are in the spa, Kyle's dog, Bossy, steals his safety glasses and Georgia gives chase. Kyle then decides to watch the eclipse without them, damaging his eyesight. At Lassiter's Lake, Mason Turner (Taylor Glockner) tells his girlfriend Kate Ramsay (Ashleigh Brewer) that he loves her for the first time. Before she can reply, Kate spots Mark Brennan (Scott McGregor), her ex-boyfriend, who she believed to be dead. She tries to find him, but Mark disappears. Back at Number 32, Lucas and Vanessa go to check on their infant son, Patrick (Basquait Voevodin-Knack), and discover that he has been taken.

== Development ==
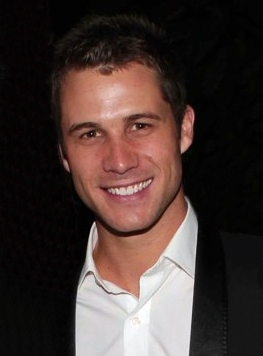
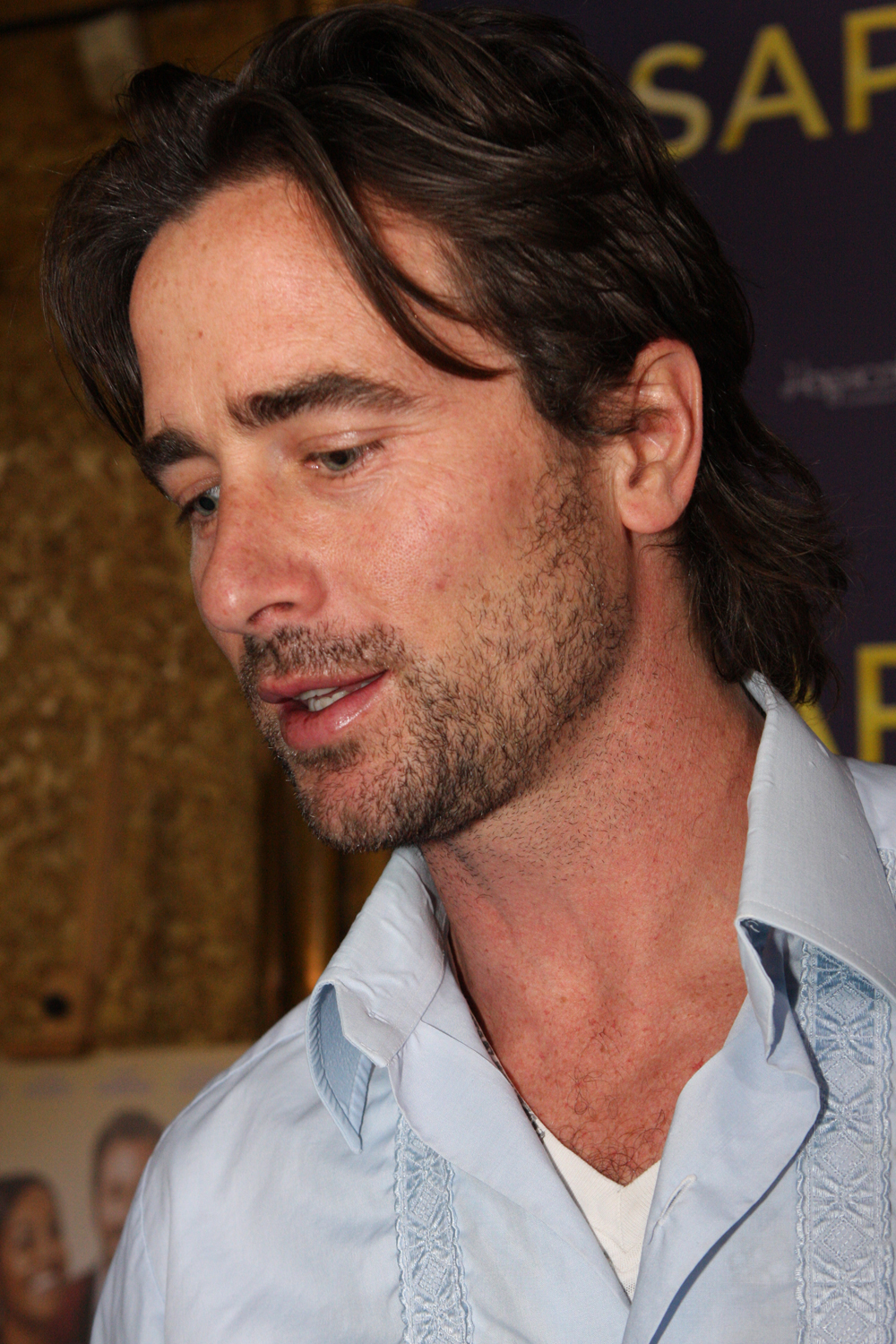
Mark Brennan, played by Scott McGregor (left), and Brad Willis, now played by Kip Gamblin (right), returned to the show during "Episode 6646".

Episode 6646 was written by Jason Herbison and directed by Laurence Wilson. It was executively produced by Richard Jasek, who first teased the episode during a January 2013 interview with Jackie Brygel from TV Week. He revealed that Mark Brennan (played by Scott McGregor) would return during an eclipse, two years after being presumed dead, causing his ex-girlfriend, Kate Ramsay (Ashleigh Brewer), to question whether she has really seen him. In addition to Mark's return, Jasek said that "a whole lot of things happen" in the episode and added that it was "definitely going to be interesting." Herbison commented that he was proud of the episode, saying "It's really difficult to find a story that hasn't been done before and the eclipse was something a bit fresh and original. I really liked the way several major events unfolded in the one episode".

Several storylines began for various characters during the episode. Mark Brennan's return was described by Hazel Bradley from The West Australian as being "nearly as dramatic as his exit", which saw him leave during a real-time episode in 2011. The eclipse scenes were filmed in late 2012 when McGregor came home to Australia for Christmas. Just after Kate's boyfriend, Mason Turner (Taylor Glockner), declared his love for her, Kate saw a glimpse of Mark during the eclipse. Of the moment, McGregor explained "I'm not sure of all the details, but as the Sun goes behind the Moon Kate thinks she sees Brennan. But as it is dark she can't be sure." The actor called it "a pretty cool return" and Kate was left "unable to shake the feeling" that Mark was alive.

The episode also saw the return of Brad Willis following an absence of twenty years, as well as the introduction of his family. The character's return was announced in February 2013 and came during a period of continuing focus on families within the show. During the eclipse, Brad, his wife, Terese (Rebekah Elmaloglou), and their two teenage children, Imogen (Ariel Kaplan) and Joshua (Harley Bonner), moved into Number 22 Ramsay Street. Brad was reunited with his former lover Lauren Turner (Kate Kendall). Kip Gamblin, who was cast in the role of Brad, revealed that his character had no idea Lauren was back in Erinsborough. He also observed that Lauren's reaction to Brad's appearance was "like she's seen a ghost!" All About Soap's Kerry Barrett wondered if there was still "a spark" between the pair.

Episode 6646 saw Lucas Fitzgerald (Scott Major) propose to Vanessa Villante (Alin Sumarwata) again, before they discovered their son, Patrick Villante (Basquait Voevodin-Knack), had been taken. Lucas felt the eclipse was the ideal time to propose to Vanessa, who was "thrilled" and accepted straight away. However, their happiness was short lived when they were alarmed to discover Patrick's pram empty. Lucas and Vanessa began to fear that something terrible had happened to their son. Major commented "It's such a scary moment when Lucas realises that Patrick has disappeared. Shock sets in initially, so there's a myriad of different scenarios going through his head. At first he's as in the dark as everyone else about what's happened". The event also marked the start of Stephanie Scully's (Carla Bonner) exit storyline.

During the eclipse, Kyle Canning (Chris Milligan) sustains serious damage to his eyesight. When he and Georgia Brooks (Saskia Hampele) watch the eclipse together, his dog steals his safety glasses and Kyle makes the unwise decision to look at the eclipse without them. Georgia frantically urges him to stop and Kyle screams out "in agony" as his retinas are damaged. While many storylines began during this episodes, a smaller one ended. A "lovesick" Amber Turner (Jenna Rosenow), who had developed a crush on Chris Pappas (James Mason), was told by Georgia that she was "totally barking up the wrong tree" as Chris was gay and would not return her affection. Despite this, Amber declared her feelings for Chris and was rejected by him. They then shared "a sweet moment" where Chris explained that if he was straight, he would want her to be his girlfriend.

== Promotion and broadcast ==
In Australia, Eleven released a short trailer for "The Eclipse", featuring scenes from the various events that occur in the episode. British broadcaster, Channel 5 created their own promo, with the tagline "Four life-changing events. One unmissable episode." "Episode 6646" was aired on 20 May 2013 in Australia and almost a month later on 17 June in the UK. A real annular solar eclipse occurred in Australia ten days before the episode aired there.

== Reception ==
Episode 6646 was viewed by an audience of 353,000 upon its broadcast in Australia, making it the top rated programme on the digital multichannels. In the UK, the episode was seen by 780,000 viewers during the lunch time showing. A total of 1.07 million viewers watched the episode when it aired in the early evening.

Dianne Butler of the Herald Sun said a "baby abduction" would be "a huge deal on any other week in Erinsborough, but unfortunately it clashes with the arrival of the Willis family, which means the return of Brad Willis, who's been in Bangkok having face-altering cosmetic surgery." Describing the episode, a reporter for the Liverpool Daily Post stated "There's a total eclipse of the heart as the locals gather to watch the moon block out the sun, and Lauren comes face to face with her first love: Brad Willis." The reporter felt sorry for Kyle after he damaged his sight during the eclipse and felt that Lucas and Vanessa's happiness was "short-lived (yet again)", following Patrick's disappearance. A critic for the Daily Record quipped that "the solar eclipse stirs up all of the Ramsay Street residents." They also wondered if there would "still be some chemistry" between Lauren and Brad.

Writing ahead of the episode's broadcast in the UK, Digital Spy's Daniel Kilkelly said that Neighbours would air "a must-see week of episodes" in which "a variety of dramatic incidents" take place during the eclipse. He added "As the local community gathers together to witness the astronomical event, the Ramsay Street residents are unaware that some of their lives might be about to change forever." A TVTimes columnist noted that Lucas and Vanessa's romantic evening came to "a sudden halt" when they learned Patrick was gone. Of the returning characters, the columnist commented "Brad Willis returns – with a new face, naturally – and Kate gets a visit from Mark Brennan. Yes, he was supposed to have died – but that's soap for you..." Kerry Barrett from All About Soap observed that the episode plunged the characters "into darkness – and chaos!"

In March 2015, Genevieve Hassan from BBC News included "The Eclipse" on their list of Neighbours' 30 most memorable moments. Michael Hogan of Grazia included the episode in their feature on the soap's "10 Maddest Moments", stating "Rapidly running out of disasters to inflict on the residents of Ramsay Street, the show hit upon the idea of a solar eclipse in 2013. All manner of live-changing events duly unfolded under the cover of midday darkness." He added that the real eclipse, which occurred some days before the episode aired, was "boring by comparison."
