= The Erinsborough Tornado =

2014 Neighbours storyline

"The Erinsborough Tornado" is a storyline from the Australian television soap opera Neighbours, which began on 29 August 2014 when a large storm hit the fictional suburb of Erinsborough and later developed into a tornado. The storyline was one of the dramatic events of Neighbours in 2014 and saw many characters' fates left in question, including long standing characters Paul Robinson (Stefan Dennis) and Lou Carpenter (Tom Oliver). The storyline was conceived following the success of 2013's wedding explosion and was shot in June 2014. Several wind and rain machines were used to create the storm and tornado effects. A promotional trailer for the storyline was released on 15 August 2014.

The plot saw residents of Ramsay Street in Erinsborough prepare for a storm. As the storm set in, many residents were unaware of the eventual severity of the storm, especially when it developed into a tornado only minutes before it hit the area. Daniel Robinson (Tim Phillipps) and his girlfriend Amber Turner (Jenna Rosenow) were out in Amber's car taking photos of the storm when they were whipped up by the tornado; Daniel's uncle, Paul was also out driving looking for Daniel when the tornado hit. The power was lost to Ramsay Street and Georgia Brooks (Saskia Hampele) vanished from her house while she was recovering from a throat operation, leaving her family worried for her whereabouts. As the storm worsened, Lou Carpenter became trapped under a fallen beam at Harold's Store and his friend Susan Kennedy (Jackie Woodburne) was forced to perform an emergency tracheotomy on him when he began choking on a piece of food.

== Plot ==
News reaches Erinsborough that a storm is approaching and the residents begin preparations. Mark Brennan (Scott McGregor) and his housemate Paige Smith (Olympia Valance) give into their growing feelings for one another and they have sex. Bailey Turner (Calen Mackenzie) watches the news reports with interest when a severe weather warning for Erinsborough and the surrounding areas is issued. His sister, Amber Turner (Jenna Rosenow), and her boyfriend Daniel Robinson (Tim Phillipps), head out into the storm to take photographs after Daniel argues with his uncle Paul Robinson (Stefan Dennis) over his lack of interest in climbing the career ladder.

As the storm hits, Georgia Brooks (Saskia Hampele) goes missing suddenly along with her fiancé Kyle Canning's (Chris Milligan) dog, Bossy. Kyle heads out into the storm looking for them when it suddenly develops into a tornado, while Paul goes looking for Daniel and Amber, seeking to make amends for their argument. Georgia and Bossy shelter with Kyle's grandmother, Sheila (Colette Mann), but Kyle remains missing. Daniel and Amber's car is swept up by the tornado, but they manage to escape and take refuge in the local garage. Paul's car is hit by a runaway skip. Daniel and Amber rescue Paul and they shelter together as the storm worsens. Daniel proposes to Amber and she accepts.

At Harold's Store, Lou Carpenter (Tom Oliver) shelters from the tornado with his friend Susan Kennedy (Jackie Woodburne). The cooling system in the roof collapses, trapping Lou, while a piece of food he was eating becomes lodged in his throat. As a result, Susan is forced to perform an emergency tracheotomy to save his life, before he is rushed to hospital. Paul is treated for broken ribs and the cracking of his prosthetic leg. Georgia and Bossy find Kyle trapped in a portable toilet, that was swept up by the tornado. As the clean up operation begins, Lou inadvertently reveals to Matt Turner (Josef Brown) that his wife Lauren (Kate Kendall) kissed Brad Willis (Kip Gamblin). Matt and Brad's wife, Terese (Rebekah Elmaloglou), struggle to forgive their partners. Meanwhile, Daniel and Imogen Willis (Ariel Kaplan) rescue an injured wombat, and Nate Kinski (Meyne Wyatt), an Afghanistan war veteran, helps Susan overcome her post traumatic stress.

== Production ==
=== Conception and development ===
Executive producer Jason Herbison first teased the storyline in June 2014, telling Digital Spy's Daniel Kilkelly that the cast and crew were in the middle of filming "a major event" that would screen later in the year. He quipped "think natural disaster." Herbison later said the natural disaster storyline would be "huge" and full of stunts and action. He added "The cast and crew are excited to get out there in the elements and do something different." The storyline was conceived following the success of 2013's wedding explosion, which saw two characters die. Jackie Woodburne, who plays Susan Kennedy, commented that as many of the show's storylines were about human drama, it was good to mix things up every now and then. On 15 August 2014, it was announced that a tornado would hit Erinsborough, resulting in "long term repercussions for Ramsay Street", while a number of on-going storylines would "come to a head as the danger escalates".

A few days later the first characters to be involved in the tornado plot were revealed to be newcomer Daniel Robinson (Tim Phillipps) and his girlfriend Amber Turner (Jenna Rosenow), whose "honeymoon period" comes to a halt by a revelation during the storm. As Amber and Daniel experienced their first full argument, the storm intensified and the tornado ripped the roof off their car, forcing them to seek shelter in the garage. At the same time, Daniel's uncle, Paul (Stefan Dennis), tried to find him and Amber, after realising that he overstepped the mark by telling Amber about Daniel's ex-girlfriend and how she inspired his tattoo. When the visibility got worse, Paul ended up hitting something with his car. Shortly after, he collided with runaway skip and had to be rescued by Daniel and Amber. When a shelving unit collapsed in the garage, Daniel pulled Amber out of the way and became "inspired by the near miss", so he proposed to her.

It was later announced that long standing character Lou Carpenter (Tom Oliver), would be placed in a life-threatening situation when the tornado causes the roof of Harold's Store to collapse on him, while a piece of food becomes lodged in his throat. Fellow long standing character Susan Kennedy (Woodburne) was trapped with him and when she could not lift the beam to help, she called her husband, Karl (Alan Fletcher). Woodburne explained "Karl tells Susan she's done everything she can. He wants her to focus on keeping Lou as calm and comfortable as possible. He can't breathe, so that's all she can do." However, Susan cannot stand back and watch Lou die, so she performed an emergency tracheotomy with guidance from Karl over the phone.

Other characters caught up in the storm included Lauren Turner (Kate Kendall), who was forced to shelter with Brad Willis (Kip Gamblin). The "chemistry between them is stronger than ever" as they discussed their daughter and the kiss they shared a few months previously. Georgia Brooks (Saskia Hampele) and Bossy the dog went out into the storm, causing her fiancé, Kyle Canning (Chris Milligan), to try to find them. However, they turned up safe and Kyle disappeared, with viewers being shown his abandoned mobile phone in a gutter. Milligan commented "People are panicking. They're worrying about what's happened to him in the storm."

=== Filming ===
The scenes were filmed during the winter and Stefan Dennis commented that the shoot was very cold. It also rained during the week, which added to the effects. Several wind and rain machines were used to create the storm, while three large wind machines used at the same time helped to create the tornado. Large hoses were used to create the torrential rain. Various pieces of debris were also thrown around the sets. Of shooting the scenes, Dennis said, "In the past we've had an explosion or a fire or a car crash or a bomb, where as this was rain and hail and wind and tornado and things falling apart and buildings falling over – so there was an awful lot of special effects all at the same time." Dennis stated that scenes brought back some bad memories of the time he was caught up in a real tornado in Queensland in the 1960s. Rosenow and Phillipps had to do some stunts during their scene in the car, and Rosenow admitted that they got soaked from all the rain. She also said that the scenes were "epic to film" and the night shoots were fun.

== Promotion and broadcast ==
Neighbours released a promotional trailer for the storyline in Australia. The trailer features Daniel, Amber, Toadie, Paul, Karl and Imogen caught up in strong winds on Ramsay Street. The trailer ends with the tagline "The tornado is coming", which is then blown away by the winds. The first picture of the tornado's destruction was released exclusively to entertainment website Digital Spy. with five more promotional pictures released four days later. Neighbours also released behind the scenes videos, which showed how some of the scenes were shot.

The week-long storyline began airing on 29 August 2014, with residents preparing for the storm, unaware of how severe it would be. It developed into a tornado in the following episode. In the UK the storyline will be broadcast from 15 September 2014.

== Reception ==
=== Ratings ===
The first episode of The Erinsborough Tornado was watched by 329,000 Australian viewers, making Neighbours the top rated program on digital multichannels that night. The second episode achieved 325,000 viewers in Australia, making Neighbours the third-highest rated show on digital multichannels. The third episode featuring the aftermath of the tornado made Neighbours the second most watched show on digital multichannels, with 304,000 Australians tuning in.

=== Critical response ===
The storyline received a mixed reaction from critics. Prior to the storyline airing, Siobhan Duck from the Herald Sun said it "sounds far-fetched". David Knox agreed with Duck, saying "congrats to the writers of Neighbours who have dug deep with a storyline that goes beyond the bizarre". While Em Rusciano, a social commentator for TV Week believed it was unrealistic. Her colleague, Stephen Downie, disagreed and argued, "compared with Toadie's (Ryan Moloney) ability to bed hot chicks, a tornado is probably one of the more believable Neighbours storylines." A reporter for The Sun-Herald gave the storyline a mark of two and a half out of five.

Ben Pobjie from The Sydney Morning Herald gave the storyline a mixed review. He thought no one would be bored while there was a tornado around, which was probably why Neighbours were

delivering a whole week of thrilling tornado action. Obviously, in these modern times, a televised tornado that doesn't contain sharks seems a little bit passe, but in Neighbours terms, it's big news, as Ramsay Street has never before been hit by a tornado – unless you count Madge's personality. Boom!

Pobjie observed that the episode broadcast on 1 September contained mostly "background rumbling and rain noises" and viewers had to wait until the end for "some hardcore storm opera". The Age's Craig Mathieson thought the premise of the storyline worked because it got him watching the show again, but it was not very compelling and there were too many predictable scenes. He commented,

for all the production effort involved – there was a tidy master shot of an upended power pole across a crushed car roof, and some nifty handheld camera work – what was disappointing about Tornado Week on Neighbours was how neatly it was rolled out. The loss of normality tested the emotional commitment of the characters, as they huddled together, shared confidences and professed their love for each other. Not to sound churlish, but I wanted Lou dead.

He joked that an earthquake storyline in 2015 might bring back viewers. A contributor to Inside Soap included the storyline in their feature on "Soap's Top 10 stunts!". They thought it was not the "most convincing storm", but it was more exciting than the average Monday lunchtime. They also said, "The special effects weren't much cop, but super Susan's life-saving efforts are worth a few points. Is there anything she can't do?"

In 2016, The Daily Telegraph ranked the storyline at Number Ten in the serial's Twelve Most Shocking Moments. In 2022, Sam Strutt of The Guardian ranked the tornado as seventh in a list of the show's top ten most memorable moments. Strutt assessed that "the freak weather event is a standard soapy plot: all that death and destruction nicely sets up a myriad of storylines revolving around desperate sexual encounters, proposals and missing characters." Ben Fenlon from the HuffPost called the serial's efforts in the storyline a "poor excuse for a CGI tornado that loomed over Ramsay Street striking completely no fear in to anyone who saw it." In 2015, a Herald Sun reporter included the Erinsborough Tornado in their "Neighbours' 30 most memorable moments" feature.
