= Amber Turner =

Fictional character from the Australian soap opera Neighbours

- Neighbours character
- Portrayed by: Jenna Rosenow
- Duration: 2013–2016
- First appearance: 7 February 2013
- Last appearance: 5 April 2016
- Introduced by: Richard Jasek
- Spin-off appearances: Amber's Blog (2012); Neighbours vs Zombies (2014)
In-universe information
- Occupation: Student; Waitress; Photographer; Child care worker; Public relations officer
- Father: Matt Turner
- Mother: Lauren Carpenter
- Brothers: Mason Turner; Bailey Turner
- Half-sisters: Paige Smith
- Daughters: Matilda Turner
- Grandfathers: Lou Carpenter
- Grandmothers: Kathy Carpenter
- Uncles: Guy Carpenter

Amber Turner is a fictional character from the Australian soap opera Neighbours, played by Jenna Rosenow. The actress, who had previously appeared in the show as an extra, successfully auditioned for the role of Amber and relocated to Melbourne from Geelong for filming. She said she was excited about joining the cast and seeing what she could do with her character. Amber was created and introduced along with her family, as part of a major overhaul of the show's cast. She made her first screen appearance during the episode broadcast on 7 February 2013. In April 2015, Rosenow announced her intention to leave at the end of her contract, and Amber departed on 8 January 2016. She made a cameo appearance on 5 April.

Amber is portrayed as a regular teenage girl. She is friendly, vibrant, caring and a bit naive. Rosenow said Amber would do anything for her friends and family. She added that Amber means well with her decisions and sometimes does the wrong things for the right reasons. Amber's storylines have often focused on her relationships with Robbo Slade (Aaron Jakubenko), Josh Willis (Harley Bonner) and Daniel Robinson (Tim Phillipps). The character has also endured a pregnancy scare, bullying, a crush on her gay friend and learning her child is seriously ill.

== Creation and casting ==
On 4 November 2012, it was announced that the five-strong Turner family would be introduced to Neighbours in February 2013. The family were created as part of a major overhaul of the show's cast. Of the Turners, Kate Kendall, who plays matriarch Lauren, explained "The producers were looking to get quite a traditional family in there and hark back to some of those old traditions and family values. They're going to be a really charismatic family, but you'll also get some really juicy storylines and that's what the audiences relate to. Viewers will relate to the familiarity of them and hopefully the sense of magnetism that we bring." The Turners were given an immediate link in Erinsborough through long-term resident Lou Carpenter (Tom Oliver), the father of Lauren and grandfather to Amber and her brothers.

Jenna Rosenow was cast as Amber, the only daughter of Lauren and Matt Turner (Josef Brown). Rosenow had previously appeared in Neighbours as an extra, but Amber marked her first regular role. The actress auditioned for the part and was placed on a short-list, she received a callback and was then told that she had won the role. Rosenow relocated from Geelong to Melbourne, where Neighbours is filmed. She told Daniel Kilkelly from Digital Spy that she was excited about joining the cast of Neighbours and seeing what she could do with her character. She also said that it was easy to settle in and it helped that she came into the show with four other actors. In December 2012, Neighbours launched an online spin-off called Amber's Blog, which featured Amber documenting her family's move from Mount Isa to Erinsborough. Rosenow made her debut screen appearance as Amber on 7 February 2013. In 2014, Rosenow extended her contract with the show for another year.

== Development ==
=== Characterisation ===
Before her introduction, Kendall described Amber as "the typical teenage girl", while Rosenow thought she was just a regular 17-year-old, who is a bit naive. A writer for the official Neighbours website called Amber friendly and vibrant, adding that she is "on the cusp of adulthood, dealing with the many life changes that come with it." During an interview with Kilkelly, Rosenow stated that Amber is "kind and caring" and someone who would do anything for her friends and family. When it comes to boys, she is a bit shy. She continued "Amber means well with every decision she makes, even if it means doing the wrong things for what she thinks is the right reasons." Rosenow also said that Amber seems like "the perfect good girl", but she would arrive in Erinsborough with a secret.

Amber does not initially want to be in Erinsborough and she misses her home and friends back in Mount Isa. Rosenow observed that the town did eventually grow on Amber, but for a while she came across as "disinterested" and "moody". When she started to make more of an effort, then more sides of her personality started to come out. When asked if Amber gets on with her family, Rosenow replied that she did because the whole family is loving and "really tight-knit." Amber has inherited her mother's love of horses, which has brought them closer together and she is the apple of her father's eye. The website writer added that Amber gets on well with her brothers Mason (Taylor Glockner) and Bailey (Calen Mackenzie).

=== Relationship with Robbo Slade ===
Rosenow revealed that Amber had a boyfriend back in Mount Isa that her family were unaware of. Robbo Slade (Aaron Jakubenko) was Amber's first boyfriend and Rosenow thought that Amber had put "a lot of her attention and energy" into the relationship. Speaking to Kilkelly, the actress said that the relationship proved to be "an escape" for Amber from the Turner family's problems. Robbo was a friend of Mason's and Rosenow branded him "bad news". She also described him as being "the bad boy of Mt Isa", which she believed was why Amber was attracted to him. Rosenow added that Robbo was charming to Amber's face, but the opposite behind her back. When Robbo was revealed to be a criminal, he soon skipped town. Not long after, Amber realised that she might be pregnant and that terrified her. Rosenow explained "She's still a little bit hung up on him. He was her first love, her first sexual partner, and now she's facing this potential pregnancy alone. There's a part of her that thinks the pregnancy may force Robbo to return."

Unsure what to do, Amber confided in her teacher, Kate Ramsay (Ashleigh Brewer). Rosenow said that Amber sought Kate's help because she felt comfortable around her and believed that she was the only person who knew enough about her situation to understand. She did not want to worry her parents, as she did not think they could cope with the news. Kate advised Amber to take a pregnancy test, which to Amber's relief turned out to be negative. Lou later found the test in the bin and initially assumed that it belonged to Lauren, who then realised that it was Amber's. Rosenow told an Inside Soap journalist that while Lauren put on a calm façade, inside she was hysterical. The pregnancy scare led to Amber revealing the truth about her relationship with Robbo, which then led to other family secrets being revealed, leaving Lauren devastated.

Robbo returned to Erinsborough a few months later and soon began causing trouble for the Turner family. Despite swearing to her family that she would stay away from Robbo and thinking that she was over him, Amber could not resist his charms. Rosenow told an Inside Soap columnist, "Robbo is a charmer, and he knows how to play her. He spins her the usual lines about how he never stopped loving her, he wants to get a job and save money to set them up – exactly what she wants to hear." Amber was spotted with Robbo by her younger brother Bailey, forcing her to deny anything was going on between them. Amber returned to see Robbo the next day and he seduced her. However, Amber was not as invested in the relationship because of her recent break-up. The Inside Soap columnist said that it was obvious Robbo was using Amber to get back at Mason and wondered what his "wicked scheme" would be. Robbo later tried to blackmail Amber by threatening to release footage of them together online. When he was involved in a hit-and-run, Amber was one of eight suspects.

=== Cyberbullying and crush on Chris Pappas ===
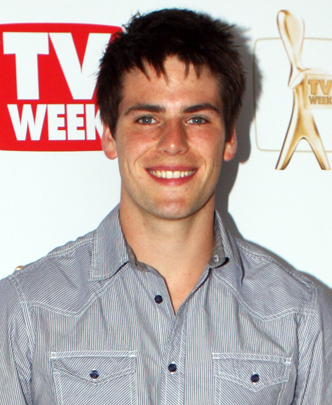
Amber developed a crush on Chris Pappas, played by James Mason.

On 18 April 2013, Kilkelly reported that Amber would develop "a surprising crush" on her friend Chris Pappas (James Mason). Chris, who is gay, befriended Amber after she started having "a tough time" at school following a falling out with Cassie Nicholls (Lisa Marie Shaw). When Amber and Cassie began feuding, Chris invited Amber out on "a friendly date" to help cheer her up and they had a good night. Amber soon got the wrong idea about their friendship and Kilkelly wrote that Chris may regret his gesture as Amber starts seeing him differently. During this time, Amber and Cassie's feud continued with them each posting a series of "catty remarks" on the social networking website Twitter. The situation took "a potentially dark turn" when Cassie briefly went missing, leaving Amber worried that she had done something drastic.

The storyline led Mason and Rosenow to speak out about the subject of cyberbullying in a video released by Neighbours. Rosenow commented that cyberbullying could be very damaging to those involved and everyone had a role to play in stopping it from happening. Amber's crush on Chris came to a conclusion during "Episode 6646". A "lovesick" Amber was told by Georgia Brooks (Saskia Hampele) that she was "totally barking up the wrong tree" as Chris was gay and would not return her affections. Despite the advice, Amber declared her feelings for Chris. They then shared "a sweet moment" in which Chris explained that he was gay, but if he was not, then he would want Amber to be his girlfriend. Chris and Amber continued to remain friends.

=== Relationship with Josh Willis ===
In May 2013, Josh Willis (Harley Bonner) was introduced to Neighbours and promotional pictures showed him with Amber. When asked if a romance would develop between the two characters, Bonner said "Hmmm, there's not a lot I can say now but there is a bit of a connection, but I'm not sure where it will go!" Amber immediately fell for Josh when he moved into Ramsay Street with his family, but her "subtle attempts at flirtation" initially went unnoticed. Amber resorted to following Josh to the local pool and watching him swim, but he was too busy training for the Commonwealth Games to notice her. Amber later let slip to Josh that she had been watching him swim, but he did not seem to mind. But when a "highly embarrassed" Amber asked him out on a date, Josh had to turn her down as he had a meeting with the school principal. Believing that she had messed things up, Amber was left heartbroken and assumed Josh was not romantically interested in her.

Josh and Amber eventually became closer when she helped him with his homework and after sharing a kiss, they began dating. However, the couple broke up a few weeks later. When Amber's friend and Josh's sister, Imogen (Ariel Kaplan), learned of a party down at Lassiter's Lake, she managed to convince Amber to come along. Upon arriving at the party, Amber went looking for Josh, but she found him chatting to another girl and decided to get even. Imogen introduced Amber to "a cute guy" called Clay (Charlie Terrier). Amber and Clay get talking and Josh later saw them kissing, leaving him devastated. Amber was unaware that Josh had seen the kiss, but Imogen did and found herself stuck in the middle of her best friend and brother. Rosenow explained "Imogen is upset because this is exactly what she wanted to avoid. She knows Josh doesn't have a good track record and she doesn't want her friend Amber to get hurt. But, now they're both in a bad position." Amber later agreed to go on a date with Clay, leaving Josh convinced that they would not get back together.

After Amber admitted to having sex with Robbo, she and Josh struggled to get things back to normal. They were then banned from seeing each other by their parents, after they believed the couple were spending too much time together, forcing Amber and Josh to sneak around. Amber and Josh were divided by their different hopes for their relationship, especially when Josh thought they were ready to have sex. Instead, Amber asked him to wait at least six months. Bonner later admitted that he did not think Amber and Josh made a good couple, as they often fought and broke up, but he did believe that they genuinely loved each other.

=== Relationship with Daniel Robinson ===
Following the introduction of Daniel Robinson in May 2014, his portrayer Tim Phillipps said he and Amber would begin spending time together due to a shared love of photography. Phillips said "There is a really nice friendship going on there and a really nice bond." The friendship initially caused tension between Daniel and Josh, but Daniel managed to put Josh's fears about his intentions towards Amber at ease. Amber became "drawn" to Daniel and they shared a "sexual chemistry" that Amber tried to ignore, as she loved Josh. Amber eventually began an affair with Daniel, but failed to find a way to break up with Josh. When Paige Smith (Olympia Valance) suspected that Amber and Daniel had feelings for each other, she kissed Daniel to cause a reaction. Amber was "gutted" to witness the kiss, but it prompted her to commit to Daniel.

Two weeks after the affair began, an increasingly suspicious Josh walked in on Amber and Daniel kissing. Rosenow believed that the storyline would always see somebody getting hurt, but she thought Josh only had himself to blame. She explained "For him it's a case of you don't know what you got until it's gone. It wasn't a great relationship, she was a doormat. Josh walked all over her." Josh smashed up Amber and Daniel's darkroom and Rosenow said the fallout would take over Amber's life for quite a while. She also said that families and friends would be divided, which was sad as Amber just wanted to be able to enjoy her new relationship.

During an argument about Daniel's ex-girlfriend, Amber and Daniel were caught up in a tornado that hit Erinsborough. After the winds blew the roof of their car, they sought shelter in the local garage and Daniel "spontaneously" proposed to Amber. She accepted, but their relationship was tested by Imogen's feelings for Daniel and the arrival of his ex-girlfriend. Rosenow thought the engagement might end in tears, saying "Amber is a little naive; she's looking for that perfect guy, that perfect relationship. Daniel's the type of character who always rushes into things – he's in love with the idea of being in love. They'd like to believe it's the real thing, but they're so young."

In October 2014, Daniel's ex-girlfriend Rain Taylor (Airlie Dodds) was introduced. Rain came to Erinsborough to establish a commune called New Eden. However, after befriending Amber, Rain began manipulating her into moving into the commune and giving up her university studies. Both Lauren and Daniel expressed their fears about Rain's influence on Amber, but she refused to listen to them. Rain later used a meditation session to try and brainwash Amber into breaking up with Daniel. Rain's plan failed, but her influence left Amber questioning her relationship with Daniel and she ended their engagement. Shortly after Amber's car was stolen, Daniel came to her rescue, explaining that he sensed she was in trouble. Amber took this as a sign that they were meant to be together and they reunited.

On the day of their wedding, Daniel decided to try to find Amber an antique ring from a well that belonged to his ancestor. Phillipps explained that Amber had been obsessing about the love story connected to the ring and Daniel wanted to give it to her on their wedding day. Daniel became trapped in the well with Imogen, causing Amber to assume that they had run off together. That same night, Josh comforted "a fragile" Amber and they had a one-night stand. When Daniel and Imogen were rescued, they reconciled with Amber, who "tried to put her night of passion with Josh behind her as quickly as possible." Amber and Daniel's relationship eventually became strained, especially with the pregnancy, and they realised that they had to break-up as too much had changed.

=== Pregnancy ===
"It's a pretty huge thing to be faced with. No one wants to find out that there might be something wrong with their baby. I think all things considered she handled things well."

— Rosenow on how Amber has coped with her baby's condition.

A few weeks after the wedding, Amber learned that she was pregnant. Amber initially felt unwell during an exercise session and when Paige noticed that she was acting strangely, Amber admitted that she was pregnant. She then explained that she had no idea if the baby was Daniel's or Josh's. Paige advised Amber to keep the news from Daniel, so she could have time to do a paternity test. However, Amber was unable to keep it a secret and told an "overjoyed" Daniel. When Josh learned that Amber was expecting, he realised that he too could be the father. Amber initially told him that the baby was Daniel's, but told him the truth when Imogen threatened to do it herself. Josh was "excited" about the possibility of becoming a father, but it made things more complicated between Amber and Daniel. Josh turned up at Amber's first ultrasound and Rosenow branded the moment "very awkward". She explained, "Obviously it's not an ideal situation. Amber's really hoping that it's Daniel's baby, but they are all aware that Josh could very well be the father. That doesn't mean Amber will get back together with Josh, though."

Amber later took a paternity test and learned that Josh was the baby's father, devastating Daniel. As they sat down to discuss how they would make things work, they realised that it would not be so straightforward. Imogen and Paige managed to cheer Amber up and she celebrated her pregnancy by nicknaming her baby "Junior". The tension between Amber, Daniel and Josh took its toll on Amber's health and she was diagnosed with high blood pressure. When the pressure became too much, Amber left town for a beachside cottage. Daniel eventually found her and apologised, but they were interrupted by Josh and an argument broke out. Amber asked them both to leave, but when Josh came back, Amber suddenly collapsed. Amber and Josh later learned that their baby had Congenital diaphragmatic hernia (CDH) and its chances of survival were not good. Rosenow stated that Amber was upset and believed her baby would not make it. Amber visited a specialist and Rosenow commented, "Amber and Josh are determined to do whatever they can to save their baby."

Amber and Josh later learned that their baby actually had a mild form of CDH, and Rosenow said that Amber was "pretty relieved" by the news. Rosenow also explained that she had researched the condition and was surprised when people with children who have CDH reached out to her via social media. When asked what she thought of Josh's "desperate" attempts to support their baby, Rosenow commented "Josh is definitely a caring guy and he does just wants the best for Amber and their baby. However he does do a few questionable things and Amber questions his motives for doing certain things." The actress was unsure whether she could forgive Josh for posing as a supportive friend online, branding the situation "just wrong" and believing that Josh went about things the wrong way. Rosenow added that she was pleased to see the changes that Amber went through during 2015, especially realising that she did not need a man in her life.

=== Departure ===
In April 2015, Rosenow told Noel Murphy of The Weekly Review that she was thinking about moving on from Neighbours at the end of her contract. Rosenow said she would be moving to Los Angeles to pursue other acting opportunities. In November, Kendall confirmed Rosenow's exit. Amber's exit storyline saw her leave Erinsborough for a job opportunity in Queensland, along with Matilda. Josh initially decided to move with her, but after he kissed Amber, she told him to stay behind, fearing that he was still suffering from post-natal depression. Amber departed on 8 January 2016, but later made a cameo appearance on 5 April 2016.

== Storylines ==
Amber move to Erinsborough with her family, but she misses her friends and her secret boyfriend. Amber's boyfriend, Robbo, turns up and Mason tells Amber that Robbo just wants his share of the money from a warehouse robbery they took part in. Robbo tries to convince Amber that he wants the money for their future, but he skips town without her after trying to rob Lassiter's Hotel. Amber then experiences a pregnancy scare. Amber develops a crush on her gay friend Chris Pappas and tries to prevent him from dating Seamus Illich (Scott Smart). Chris finds out and Amber is forced to apologise. Amber then befriends Imogen Willis and begins dating her brother Josh. They break up when Amber learns that Josh told his swimming coach that she was a stalker, so he would not find out about their relationship. With Imogen's encouragement, Amber tries to move on with Clay Blair. But Amber rejects Clay's sexual advances and leaves his car, causing her to run into Robbo. He tries to persuade Amber that he has changed and they have sex, which Amber regrets. Amber learns Robbo recorded them and takes Imogen's car to confront him. Robbo dies after being involved in a hit-and-run and Amber is questioned by the police. Hudson Walsh (Remy Hii) admits to running Robbo down.

Amber and Josh get back together, but when she feels undermined by him, she asks him for some time apart. Amber becomes jealous when Josh spends time with local journalist Ruby Knox (Maggie Naouri) and they break up. They reunite and Amber finds out that he kissed Ruby, but Josh assures her it was a mistake. Josh qualifies for the Commonwealth Games and Amber prepares for them to be separated for three months, but Josh seriously injures his shoulder while abseiling and his competitive swimming career is ended. Amber supports him as he lashes out. Amber befriends Daniel Robinson and they bond over a shared love for photography. He tells her that they share a vibe, but will not act on it as she is dating Josh. However, Amber develops feelings for Daniel and tries to break up with Josh. Paige Novak encourages Amber to make more of an effort with Josh. However, Amber and Daniel begin an affair, which Josh later discovers. Amber and Daniel continue their relationship and Imogen turns against Amber. Matt also admits to Amber that he is disappointed with how her relationship with Daniel came about. Paige is revealed to be Amber's half-sister and Amber becomes jealous of Paige's connection with her mother.

When a storm hits Erinsborough, Amber and Daniel go out to photograph it. They argue about Daniel's ex-girlfriend and are caught up in a tornado. They seek shelter in the local garage and later rescue Paul (Stefan Dennis), who has come to find them. Daniel proposes and Amber accepts. Amber and Imogen repair their friendship. Daniel announces the engagement at Kyle (Chris Milligan) and Georgia's (Saskia Hampele) joint hen and bucks party, causing an argument with Josh, who then becomes drunk and punches Chris. Amber supports Josh when she sees how guilty he is feeling. When she realises her parents do not support her engagement, Amber and Daniel move into his car. Amber returns home after the car is attacked. Daniel's ex-girlfriend, Rain Taylor (Airlie Dodds), arrives in town and Amber worries that Rain wants Daniel back. Daniel assures her that he loves her and Amber befriends Rain. Rain tries to set up a commune called New Eden and Amber decides to put her university plans on hold to move into it. During a guided meditation, Rain convinces Amber to break-up with Daniel. Lauren and Daniel convince Amber that she is being brainwashed. Before she leaves, Rain tells Amber her relationship with Daniel will not last.

Deciding that she wants to find herself, Amber breaks off her engagement to Daniel. Josh then tells her he still loves her and Amber learns Imogen kissed Daniel. She forgives Imogen when she learns it was a mistake. Josh and Amber develop some negatives from 1990 and they spot a dead body in the background of one of the photos. Paul tells them it was not a body, just a well-known drunk sleeping under the bushes. Both Josh and Daniel try to win Amber back. Josh kisses Amber, but when Daniel comes to her rescue after her car is stolen, she realises that she wants to be with him and they get engaged again. Their plan to marry in five weeks leads to opposition from their families. Amber overhears Harold Bishop (Ian Smith) telling Daniel that marrying her would be a mistake, causing Daniel to ban Harold from the wedding. Paul tells Amber that Imogen is in love with Daniel, and Imogen admits it is true. On the day of the wedding, Daniel fails to show up and Paige tells Amber that she saw him with Imogen. Amber believes they have run off together and calls the wedding is off. She stays in her hotel suite and Josh comforts her. Amber later learns Daniel and Imogen were trapped in a well, after looking for an old ring. Amber reconciles with them both.

Shortly after, Matt dies after being struck by Danni Ferguson's (Laura McIntosh) car. Amber discovers she is pregnant, but admits to Paige that Daniel might not be the father as she had a one-night stand with Josh. Amber falls out with Josh when she sees him becoming closer to Danni. Both Daniel and Josh learn that they could be the father of Amber's baby and they attend the ultrasound together. Daniel and Josh argue about Amber, causing her to become stressed. She runs away to Portsea, but Daniel and Josh find her. Amber asks them both to leave and she later collapses. After returning home, Amber books a paternity test and learns Josh is the father of her baby. During her second ultrasound, Karl Kennedy (Alan Fletcher) informs Amber that her baby has congenital diaphragmatic hernia and a 50% chance of survival. Amber and Josh decide that their best option is to travel to the United States for fetal surgery, but Daniel and their parents are against the plan. Amber and Daniel's relationship becomes strained and they break up. Amber considers leaving university to earn more money, but Lauren talks her out of it. Instead, she tells Josh that she may need to rely on him to pay for the trip to the US.

When she learns Josh has been fired and that he was selling illegal peptides, she tells him to give her space. She later vents her frustrations to an online friend called Phoebe. Following an amniocentesis, Amber and Josh learn that their baby is a girl and that her CDH is mild. Amber discovers Josh has been posing as Phoebe and tells him that he can only be there for the baby in future, not her. While giving a talk at the school, Amber slips on a grape injuring herself. Tests at the hospital reveal that she and the baby are fine. Amber helps out at a sleep-out protest at Erinsborough High, but ends up trapped with Susan Kennedy (Jackie Woodburne) when a fire breaks out. She goes into labour prematurely, and fears if she has the baby while trapped it will almost certainly die. Amber and Susan are rescued by the fire fighters, and Amber is rushed to the hospital, where she tells Josh to make sure he puts their daughter first in case anything happens to them. Amber gives birth via caesarean section and her daughter is placed in the neonatal intensive care unit. Amber and Josh name their daughter Matilda (Eloise Simbert) in honour of Matt, and she undergoes successful surgery. After they bring her home, Amber stops Josh from rolling on Matilda in his sleep. When he admits that he is overwhelmed by everything, Amber doubts his ability to care for Matilda and asks that he does not look after her alone. Amber accepts a job with a CDH charity in Queensland and Josh accuses her of trying to take Matilda away from him. The Willises threaten legal action against her, but after Lou and Josh's grandfather Doug Willis (Terence Donovan) sit them down, they agree to work through their issues amicably. Josh decides to move to Brisbane to be closer to Matilda. Amber initially accepts the plan, but when Josh kisses her, she tells him to stay in Erinsborough. After saying her goodbyes, Amber and Matilda leave for Brisbane, with Lauren accompanying them for a few days.

Later in the year, Josh decides to move to Queensland to be closer to Amber and Matilda. However, before he can make the move, he is caught up in the explosion at Lassiter's Hotel and pinned beneath a column. Having sacrificed himself to save Daniel, Josh is told that he is going to die, and has his family call Amber so he can say goodbye to her and Matilda via video message. He tells Amber to let Matilda know that he loved her and that she was his last thought, before he dies.

== Reception ==
In 2014, Rosenow was nominated for Best Daytime Star at the Inside Soap Awards for her portrayal of Amber. While describing the Turner family, TV Week's Ilona Marchetta and Jackie Brygel called Amber "the sulky teenage daughter". Dianne Butler, writing for news.com.au, branded Amber "dewy". During a feature on "toxic, troublesome pairings" in soaps, Mark James Lowe from All About Soap included Amber and Robbo, saying "Despite numerous warnings from her family, and the fact Robbo got her brother sent to juvie, the teen still can't seem to keep away from her bad-boy lover. (Blood's thicker than water, Amber!)" When Robbo blackmailed Amber, Laura-Jayne Tyler of Inside Soap quipped "Poor Amber may be naive, but she doesn't deserve that!"

When Amber confessed to Chris about sabotaging his date, a Sunday Mail reporter observed, "Her honesty might have been well intentioned, but it makes a mess of their friendship." Of Amber and Joshua, a TV Week columnist quipped "Never before have two such genetically blessed individuals been drawn together." The columnist also thought that the relationship would be over in "record time." Anthony D. Langford from TheBacklot.com disliked the pairing, commenting "I know the show is trying to put a spotlight on Josh and Amber, but they are a really boring, chemistry free couple." In February 2015, a Sunday Mail reporter noted "The saga of Amber's love life has been going back and forth for some time but now it seems she has decided that Daniel is the one she wants."
