= Brad Willis (Neighbours) =

Fictional character from the Australian soap opera Neighbours

- Neighbours character
- Kip Gamblin as Brad
- Portrayed by: Benjamin Mitchell (1989); Scott Michaelson (1991–1993); Kip Gamblin (2013–2017)
- Duration: 1989, 1991–1993, 2013–2017
- First appearance: 31 October 1989
- Last appearance: 7 April 2017
- Introduced by: Don Battye (1989); Richard Jasek (2013)
- Spin-off appearances: Hey Piper (2015)
- Scott Michaelson as Brad (1992)
In-universe information
- Occupation: Surf shop employee; Barman; Swimming coach; Gym manager; Yoga instructor; Health teacher
- Family: Willis
- Father: Doug Willis
- Mother: Pam Willis
- Brothers: Adam Willis; John Willis
- Sisters: Gaby Willis; Cody Willis
- Wife: Beth Brennan (1993–; divorced); Terese Willis (1995–2016); Lauren Turner (2016–)
- Sons: Ned Willis; Josh Willis
- Daughters: Paige Smith; Imogen Willis; Piper Willis
- Grandsons: Gabriel Smith; Freddie
- Granddaughters: Matilda Turner
- Grandfathers: Bert Willis; Seamus Beresford
- Grandmothers: Moina Beresford
- Aunts: Faye Hudson
- Nephews: Zac Willis
- Nieces: Roxy Willis
- First cousins: Cameron Hudson

Brad Willis is a fictional character from the Australian soap opera Neighbours. He made his first screen appearance during the episode broadcast on 31 October 1989. The character was initially played by Benjamin Mitchell, before Scott Michaelson took over the role two years later. Brad was re-introduced alongside his sister, Gaby (Rachel Blakely), during a period of roller coaster ratings for the show. Michaelson revealed that as soon as he learnt he had won the role of Brad, he went surfing five days in a row, as he knew he was going to be busy over the upcoming months. Michaelson signed a new twelve-month contract with Neighbours in October 1992 and a year later, he announced he would be leaving the soap. Michaelson filmed his final scenes in November and departed on 15 December 1993.

Before the character returned to Neighbours, he was said to be living in America after gaining a basketball scholarship. The scriptwriters had wanted Brad to become a professional player, but after Michaelson told them he was a surfer, Brad became a "surf bum" instead. Brad was described as being a "friend to all" and a "nice, lovable fool". He had a caring attitude and a love for family. The character's storylines often revolved around his relationships. He dated his neighbour, Lucy Robinson (Melissa Bell), and then fell in love with Beth Brennan (Natalie Imbruglia). The couple became engaged, but Beth learned Brad was having an affair with Lauren Carpenter (Sarah Vandenbergh) on their wedding day. After dating different people for a while, Brad and Beth got back together and married.

In August 1992, Brad was shot after trying to save his mother from a hostage situation involving Bob Landers (Bruce Kilpatrick). Michaelson stated that Brad's actions might not have been sensible, but he acted instinctively and the actor thought that others would have reacted the same way. A writer from BBC Online named the storyline as Brad's most notable moment throughout his duration on the show. A reporter for the Herald Sun called Brad "one of the show's most popular characters" and commented that Michaelson had a huge following because of his good looks. For his portrayal of Brad, Michaelson earned a nomination for Most Popular Actor at the 1993 Logie Awards. He also received a nomination for Hottest Man in Soap at the Inside Soap TV Awards, while Brad was nominated for Best Male Character.

The character was reintroduced in early 2013, with Kip Gamblin taking over the role, coinciding with Lauren's (now Kate Kendall) return. Brad displayed a more mature attitude, but still retained his relaxed outlook. He returned with his second wife Terese (Rebekah Elmaloglou) and their twins, Josh (Harley Bonner) and Imogen (Ariel Kaplan). His other three children, Paige (Olympia Valance), Piper (Mavournee Hazel) and Ned (Ben Hall), were later introduced. Brad marries Lauren in December 2016, before both characters depart on 7 April 2017.

== Casting ==
Benjamin Mitchell made a brief appearance as Brad in October 1989, before going on to play the character's cousin, Cameron Hudson, several years later. Scott Michaelson then took over the role and he made his debut appearance in August 1991, alongside Rachel Blakely who played Brad's sister, Gaby. The characters were introduced to the show during a period of roller coaster ratings. Of the castings, James Cockington of The Sydney Morning Herald said "Ten still believes there is life in Ramsay Street and is introducing some new, young residents this week. Rachel Blakely, 23, and Scott Michaelson, 20, conform to the teen hunk/spunk category that has made E Street such a fun place to visit." Cockington opined that Michaelson looked like he had been taken from a surfboard at the Beach by a Grundy's talent scout. He quipped "Scott's panel-van accent, by the way, is genuine." Michaelson revealed to a writer from Inside Soap that as soon as he learnt he had won the role of Brad, he went surfing five days a week as he knew he was going to be busy over the upcoming months. He added that he intended to stay with the soap for a quite a while, though he would not stay for longer than four years.

== Development ==
=== Characterisation ===
"Brad Willis, who has the invaluable support of his parents, Doug and Pam, is in his early 20s, but acts like an irresponsible teenager. He can't hold down a job and can't help chasing pretty girls."

— Woman's June Walton on Brad (1994)

Before he made his first appearance in Neighbours, Brad was said to be living in America after gaining a basketball scholarship. On his way to Australia, Brad stopped off in the fictional country of Bahgee and was arrested for drug trafficking. His parents, Doug (Terence Donovan) and Pam (Sue Jones), flew out to help him and Brad returned with them to Ramsay Street, where he was reunited with his elder sister, Gaby. The scriptwriters had wanted Brad to be a professional basketball player, but when Michaelson was offered the role, he told them he was a surfer and the character became a "surf bum" instead. On his first day in Erinsborough, Brad went to the beach to catch the waves and Josephine Monroe, author of Neighbours: The First 10 Years, commented that it was clear Brad was not going to be a high achiever like his siblings.

In his book, Neighbours: 20 years of Ramsay Street, Tony Johnston described Brad as a blond, tanned surfer, who matched his brawn with a caring attitude and a love for family. Johnston branded Brad "a hunk" and a "friend to all." A writer for Inside Soap described Brad as a "nice, lovable fool", while a TV Times journalist stated that "no one would put money on him winning a prize for original thinking." Brad's love for surfing eventually led him to find employment at a surfboard shop, where he designed boards for a while. However, when he realised his designs were being ripped off, he took a job at The Waterhole alongside his sister, Gaby. The siblings ended up competing for the manager's job and a writer for Inside Soap stated that both Brad and Gaby were convinced they were the right person for the position. They try to prove their worth to Philip Martin (Ian Rawlings), however when Gaby issues an ultimatum to him to choose between her and Brad, Philip fires her and promotes Brad.

Following his reintroduction in 2013, Brad had matured, but still maintained his "relaxed attitude to life" and friendly demeanour. He had become a PE teacher during his time away from Erinsborough, as it allowed him to spend time outside. He also became a swimming coach to his son Josh. A writer for the show's official website stated, "while he doesn't dwell on the past, he finds it difficult to escape at times."

=== Relationships ===
While he is in Surfers Paradise with Lucy Robinson (Melissa Bell) and Josh Anderson (Jeremy Angerson), Brad realised he was attracted to Lucy. However, upon meeting Beth Brennan (Natalie Imbruglia) at the resort, he realised he fancied her too. Brad and Josh competed with each other to win her over, but Brad eventually chose to date Lucy. Of his character's attraction to her, Michaelson said "Whenever Brad sees Lucy there's this real tension, there's a really long lead up, but they finally get together." Beth later followed the group back to Erinsborough and continued her quest for Brad. Monroe said Lucy and Brad were "a pretty solid item though" and Beth did not get a look in. Michaelson branded the storyline "just your typical soap opera love triangle", but agreed that it was gripping. Brad and Lucy's relationship ended when Lucy decided to pursue her modelling career in Singapore.

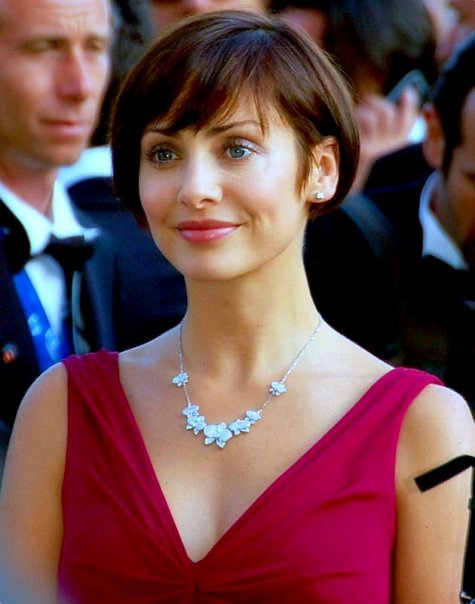
Natalie Imbruglia portrayed Beth Brennan, Brad's love interest and eventual wife.

Just one week after Lucy's departure, Beth came to Brad and asked him to have sex with her. She was fed up of being teased by Annalise Hartman (Kimberley Davies) for being a virgin. However, Brad turned Beth down, telling her to wait until she was in love. While discussing the scene, Michaelson became worried that some viewers thought Brad might be gay. He commented "After all, not many guys would say 'no' to Beth Brennan." Michaelson also thought Beth was unreal when she came straight out and asked Brad to have sex with her. Despite his initial rejection of Beth's advances, Brad succumbs to them a few weeks later. A columnist for Inside Soap commented that it did not take him long to get over Lucy. After a siege in which Brad is shot, Beth admitted her love for him. The couple became engaged, after Beth mistakes Brad's present of a friendship ring for an engagement ring. Because she was so excited with the idea of being engaged, Brad did not have the heart to tell her his real intentions, despite knowing it was not a good basis for a successful marriage.

Michaelson later revealed that Brad would turn into "a creep" when he starts dating two girls at once. Brad catches the eye of Lauren Carpenter (Sarah Vandenbergh) while she is riding her horse along the beach and Monroe stated that there was an "instant attraction" between them. She later said the chemistry between Brad and Lauren was set to blow his romance with Beth apart. Lauren befriended Beth and realised what was going on between herself and Brad could make things tricky. Brad and Lauren began an affair, after they had sex on the beach. Despite being unsure about marriage, Brad still intended to go through with his wedding to Beth. On the day of the ceremony, Beth finally learnt what had been happening between her fiancé and her friend. Imbruglia explained "They walk down the aisle together, but Beth is a bit unsure because that morning she sees Lauren and Brad together. And then she notices that Brad is just constantly looking at Lauren, and she just says 'Wait a minute, I don't think I can go through with this." The wedding was filmed outside at a boat yard and Imbruglia revealed that there were twenty-four shots in the scene, which had to be filmed twenty different ways. Beth jilted Brad at the altar and left to stay with her mother, while he continued his relationship with Lauren.

Brad and Lauren eventually broke up and Brad and Beth began dating other people, mostly so they could make each other jealous. Brad became "disastrously involved" with a 14-year-old schoolgirl called Ally Slater (Bryony Price), while Beth was wooed by Wayne Duncan (Jonathan Sammy-Lee). Imbruglia told Kelly Beswick of Inside Soap that going out with Wayne helped Beth repair her self-confidence, but at the end of the day he was just a distraction. Brad struggled to hide his feelings for Beth and he proposed to her at the same time Wayne did. Beth then revealed that she still loved Brad and accepted his proposal. Because of what happened during their first wedding, the couple decided to elope. However, their family and friends realised what was going on and tracked them down. Imbruglia revealed "They finally find us after the ceremony's actually taken place, but we decide not to tell them that we're actually married. So we're dragged back to Erinsborough for a second wedding and this time it's with all the trimmings." After marrying for a second time, Brad and Beth then decided to move to Perth to start a new life together.

=== Shooting ===
In August 1992, Bob Landers (Bruce Kilpatrick) escaped from prison and held Phoebe Bright (Simone Robertson) hostage at gunpoint in Number 30. Pam unwittingly walked into the house and Bob took her hostage too. When Brad found out his mother was inside and her life was at risk, he immediately rushed to her rescue. As he leapt to Pam's defence, a shot was fired and Brad fell to the ground unconscious. Pam was then left fearing for her son's life. When asked by a TV Times reporter if Brad was being "foolhardy" with his actions, Michaelson replied "It may not have been the most sensible thing to do, but I reckon anyone would react like that if their mum was in danger. He acted instinctively, but I certainly hope I'd behave like that if anyone in my own family was being threatened by a gunman." The actor stated that in a case like that, you would act first and worry about it later. He added that he would have been disappointed in Brad if he had not tried to help his mother and Phoebe. Brad's gunshot wound was not serious and after being treated at the hospital, he returned home. Bob was later arrested.

=== Departure ===
Michaelson signed a new twelve-month contract with the show in October 1992. However, when he took a four-week break in July 1993, David Brown of TV Week revealed that Michaelson was expected to announce his departure from Neighbours shortly after. Three months later, it was announced Michaelson was to leave the show. Brown reported the actor had entered contract negotiations with the network, but it soon became evident that he could not give them the long-term commitment they wanted. Michaelson's management told Brown "Grundy also have plans to take the show in a new direction and I don't think Scott would fit in with those plans too well. Scott has work lined up in the UK next April and he wants to be free to do it." The show's producers decided to marry Brad and Beth off and move them to Perth. Michaelson filmed his final scenes in November alongside Blakely and Imbruglia, who departed the show around the same time.

=== Reintroduction ===
On 7 February 2013, it was announced that the character would be returning to Neighbours, with actor Kip Gamblin taking over the role from Michaelson. In an interview with Erin McWhirter from TV Week, executive producer Richard Jasek revealed that he considered approaching Michaelson to play the role of Brad again, but learned that he was not acting anymore and believed that there was no point in reaching out to him. Of the recast, Gamblin told McWhirter "I'm sure there are going to be certain fans of the show who'll have an opinion about me as Brad, but that's out of my control. Richard says he doesn't hold any fears that long-time viewers will reject Kip as Brad, believing that enough time has passed for the show to pull of a successful recast. Brad, the character, has grown up and changed, so we're sure the recasting will be fine." Gamblin relocated to Melbourne for the role, while his family stayed in Sydney. The actor started filming his scenes, alongside Rebekah Elmaloglou, from 18 February and he was first seen on-screen as Brad on 20 May 2013.

Brad returned with his new wife, Terese (played by Elmaloglou), and their teenage children, Josh (Harley Bonner) and Imogen (Ariel Kaplan). Jasek commented that the Willis family would have a compelling and "unique backstory". Upon moving into Ramsay Street, Brad learns that Lauren (now played by Kate Kendall) also lives there with her family. Gamblin believed that Brad's feelings for Lauren were in the past and he is settled with Terese. He continued "However, I think Lauren may be struggling with his reappearance and, at first, she doesn't even tell her husband, Matt, that this new neighbour is her ex-boyfriend." Gamblin explained that Terese has more of a problem with Brad's ex-wife Beth, than Lauren, as the end of the marriage was "very messy." Brad and Terese met and were married quickly, making things awkward.

=== Departure (2017) ===
On 27 March 2017, it was confirmed that Gamblin would be leaving the show, along with Kendall. They filmed their final scenes in late 2016 before the annual production break. Gamblin then joined the cast of The Bodyguard in January 2017. On-screen, Brad and Lauren decide to leave Erinsborough for the Gold Coast. They departed on 7 April.

== Storylines ==
=== 1989–1993 ===
Brad meets Sharon Davies (Jessica Muschamp) and they go out on several dates together. The first is ruined when Brad takes Sharon to a basketball game he is playing in and on the second, Brad falls asleep during a movie much to Sharon's annoyance. Two years later, Brad returns to Erinsborough after his parents bail him out of an Asian jail. Brad befriends Guy Carpenter (Andrew Williams) and they start training for a cross-country race together. Brad is shocked when he discovers Guy has been using steroids to enhance his performance and he tries to talk him out of using them. Guy tells Brad to stay out of business, but Brad seeks advice from his mother, who tells Guy's aunt, Brenda Riley (Genevieve Lemon), what he has been doing. Brad begins working for Paige Sneddon (Tracy Callender) at a surf shop and he designs surfboards for her. They also begin dating. When Brad's boards are stolen from his garage, Guy becomes a suspect because a pendant found at the scene matches his one. Brad's sister, Gaby, confronts Guy and he explains a woman he previously dated gave him half of the pendant and he kept the other half. Guy realises that the woman was Paige, but his plan to get the truth out of her is ruined when Brad walks in on him asking her out on a date. Brad eventually discovers the stolen boards in Paige's garage and he breaks up with her.

Brad spends Christmas in Surfer's Paradise with Lucy Robinson and Josh Anderson. The group meet David Brennan (Simon Stokes), who has been hiding out in their beach house, and his sister, Beth. Despite competing with Josh for Beth's affections, Brad realises he likes Lucy too. Brad begins a relationship with Lucy, but when Beth moves to Erinsborough and starts competing for Brad's affections it puts a strain on their relationship. When Lucy takes a modelling assignment overseas, she and Brad break up. Beth comes to Brad and asks him to have sex with her, but he turns her down. However, he changes his mind a week later and they start dating. Brad risks his life to save his mother from Bob Landers, when he begins an armed siege at Number 30. Brad is shot in the shoulder, but his injury is not serious and he does not spend long at the hospital. After the incident, Beth admits she loves Brad. While surfing one day, Brad is attacked by a shark. He escapes with minor injuries and suggests that the attack could be a marketing gimmick for the local coffee shop. His surfboard, which has a bite mark in it, is hung above the counter and the shop is renamed The Hungry Bite. Brad risks his life again to save Beth and Hannah Martin (Rebecca Ritters) from a burning cottage.

Brad goes to give Beth a friendship ring, but she believes he is proposing to her and Brad does not correct her. Brad meets Lauren Carpenter on the beach and he begins an affair with her. Lauren suffers a pregnancy scare, but it emerges she has contracted chlamydia. On the day of their wedding, Beth notices Brad looking at Lauren and the affair is exposed. Beth jilts Brad and leaves Erinsborough. Brad continues seeing Lauren, but their relationship faces opposition from Pam. Brad leaves to work on a cruise ship for several months and he returns with Lucy in tow. Lauren becomes jealous of them and she and Brad later break up. Brad tries to win back Beth, but she is dating Wayne Duncan. Brad proposes to Beth only to learn that Wayne has also proposed. However, Beth chooses Brad. After their parents meddle in the planning of their wedding, Brad and Beth decide to elope and they marry in a registry office. However, their family and friends track them down and host a wedding for them back in Erinsborough. Brad and Beth then move to Perth and Beth gives birth to their son, Ned (Ben Hall).

=== 2013–2017 ===
Twenty years later, Brad returns to Erinsborough with his second wife Terese and their twins Imogen and Josh. Brad soon learns Lauren also lives in Ramsay Street with her family, and he accidentally tells her husband, Matt (Josef Brown), about their past relationship. Matt struggles to accept Brad dated Lauren, but they begin an uneasy friendship. Brad coaches Josh, an aspiring swimmer, but he is devastated when Josh begins training with rival coach, Don Cotter (John Adam). Brad accuses Paul Robinson (Stefan Dennis) of making advances towards Terese. He admits that he is still jealous about Terese's troubled relationship with her ex-boss, who had feelings for her. Brad realises Don is sabotaging Josh's swimming career to help his rival Hudson Walsh (Remy Hii) and Josh terminates his contract with Don. Brad agrees to coach Hudson and he also becomes the manager of the local gym. Brad finds Imogen coughing up blood in the garden and she is rushed to hospital. Brad and Terese learn that she has an eating disorder and they get her help from a counsellor.

Brad finds out Don gave Hudson a false alibi for the night of Robbo Slade's (Aaron Jakubenko) hit-and-run and Hudson confesses to hitting Robbo with Imogen's car. The Willises and Turners learn their children have covered up various incidents linked to Robbo's accident. They ban Josh and Amber (Jenna Rosenow) from seeing each other, but Brad and Lauren lift the ban, causing an argument with Terese. When Eric Edwards (Paul O'Brien) injures his back after using a faulty stepper machine at the gym, he sues Brad. Brad maintains that he put a notice on the machine and Imogen discovers that Eric suffered his back injury prior to attending the gym, causing him to drop the lawsuit. Josh qualifies for the Commonwealth Games, but he badly injures his shoulder after an abseiling accident. Brad and Terese are told that Josh will be not be able to swim competitively again. Brad blames Mason Turner (Taylor Glockner) for the accident and decides to sue him. He drops the lawsuit when he learns a faulty carabiner caused the accident. Lauren tells Brad that she gave birth to his daughter twenty years ago, and until recently she thought their daughter was dead.

Brad and Lauren decide to find their daughter. They find Lisa Tucker (Millie Samuels), who matches the description of their daughter, but they are both disappointed when a blood test proves she is not their daughter. Doug comes to visit the family. When Terese and Josh express their concerns about Doug's memory, Brad refuses to accept that something is wrong with his father, but is later forced to accept the diagnosis of Alzheimer's disease. Lauren tells Brad that she wants to stop searching for their daughter. Brad secretly hires private investigator Tracey Wong (Aileen Huynh) and she gives him a lead in Adelaide. Brad tells Terese about Tracey and she persuades him to tell Lauren. Brad and Lauren fly to Adelaide, and they share a kiss while they are there. Lauren leaves, but Brad stays to follow up on the address Tracey gave him. Brad is disappointed when he does not find his daughter and returns to Erinsborough. Brad is fired from his job at the gym, when his boss learns about the yoga classes he has been running on the side. Terese pushes Brad to accept a P.E. teaching position at Erinsborough High, but he confides in Lauren that teaching is not where his heart lies. However, when Terese administers tough love to the family, he accepts the position, even though it annoys Imogen and Josh.

Paige Smith (Olympia Valance) befriends Brad and Josh, but clashes with Terese and Imogen. A couple of months later Paige is revealed to be Brad and Lauren's long lost daughter. She explains that she kept her identity a secret while she determined whether they and their families would accept her. Although initially welcoming her, Brad is put under pressure by Terese to do a DNA test. Terese exposes Paige as having trashed Harold's Store and has Matt arrest her, which offends Lauren and Brad. He refuses to forgive Terese when Matt reveals that she has been scheming to drive Paige out of Erinsborough. Terese later drops the charges against Paige. Brad admits that he and Lauren kissed while they were in Adelaide. Terese struggles with Brad's betrayal and becomes jealous when he spends time with Lauren and Paige. After Josh punches Chris Pappas (James Mason), Brad considers stealing evidence from Josh's case file, almost costing Imogen her job. Terese and Brad's marriage becomes so strained, Terese moves into the hotel and they consider a permanent separation. Terese's old boss Ezra Hanley (Steve Nation) comes to town and Brad is jealous of the time they spend together. Brad later learns from Terese that she almost kissed Ezra and that she had to physically force him to leave her room. Brad asks her to work on their marriage and she agrees.

After Ezra is assaulted, Brad becomes the prime suspect and is arrested, but the charges are dropped when Gary Canning (Damien Richardson) confesses. Brad makes a surfboard in the Men's Shed, and Terese and Paige urge him to make it a full-time business. Karl Kennedy (Alan Fletcher) accidentally drinks the chemical catalyst that Brad was using, and he suffers bad burns to the throat, leading to tension between Brad and Susan Kennedy (Jackie Woodburne). Lauren confides in Brad about Matt's corruption, and he later discovers from Terese that Matt has cheated on Lauren. He confronts him and they argue in the road. Matt is struck by a car, having pushed Brad out of its path moments before. Matt asks Brad to look after Lauren and he dies, causing Brad to blame himself. Ezra returns and his son Clem (Max Whitelaw) joins Brad's class. Brad gives Clem a detention when he makes remarks about Ezra's row with Terese. Later Brad is suspended for looking at the contents of Clem's phone. While Terese is in Canada, Brad and Lauren end up drinking together and fall asleep on the sofa. They both feel guilty and Terese is hurt when it is Lauren that tells her, not Brad. Brad and Lauren are brought closer together when Paige's adoptive mother Mary Smith (Gina Liano) visits. Terese accuses Paige of trying to get Lauren and Brad together, which she confesses to. Brad and Lauren acknowledge that they have feelings for each other.

Seeing that Terese is drinking a lot, Brad suggests they take part in an Alcohol-free August. Terese has drink within days of starting, and Sheila Canning (Colette Mann) suggests to Brad that Terese has an alcohol problem. Terese agrees to get help, but lies to her family about attending Alcoholics Anonymous. When Brad finds out, they argue, and Brad leaves the house. Brad confesses his feelings to Lauren and they have sex. They agree not to tell Terese when they learn that she is serious about getting help for her alcoholism. However, Terese finds out and she and Brad separate, with Brad moving into a motel. Brad and Terese's youngest child, Piper (Mavournee Hazel), returns home from Canada during a family argument. Brad stays with Lauren while he looks for his own place, but when they become a couple, he moves in permanently. Brad is head-hunted by Eden Hills Grammar, but he decides to fight the closure of Erinsborough High with Susan. They organise a sleep-out protest at the school, but a fire engulfs the building. Brad finds Lauren and Terese trapped under some lockers and he manages to free Lauren, before promising to return for Terese. Terese survives with burns, and Lauren breaks up with Brad so he can help Terese recover. However Lauren and Brad eventually get back together, and he moves in with her. He also decides to become Doug's carer when Pam cannot look after him any longer. Brad is nominated for Erinsborough Citizen of the Year for his outreach program, but the venue, Lassiter's Hotel, explodes before the ceremony. Josh dies after he is pinned beneath a support column, devastating Brad. Hours later Brad is reunited with his eldest son, Ned, before Doug collapses and dies. Brad wins Citizen of the Year, but at the presentation the drone footage of him kissing Lauren is played, embarrassing Brad. Ned later admits he submitted the footage. Ned develops feelings for Lauren and kisses her, though regrets it and convinces her to keep quiet. When Piper finds out, she forces them to confess to Brad, who is devastated. Ned leaves, and Brad and Lauren's relationship is strained for a while.

Brad's Blaze Outreach program is forced to move from the Community Centre after some of the boys are photographed vandalising the property and drinking. Brad asks Father Jack Callahan (Andrew Morley) to help out after learning that Jack once ran a similar program in Queensland. They move Blaze Outreach into the empty Off Air bar. Brad and Terese hold a divorce party, where he proposes to Lauren. She turns down his first proposal, but accepts the second. Ned returns, but assures Brad that he is over Lauren. He gives Brad a tattooed wedding ring. The Blaze Outreach program loses sponsors and Aaron suggests that Brad introduce vocational training to the program. Ned tells Brad that he burnt down Maxine Cowper's (Kate Hood) house, so he begins paying her rent. Brad collapses and is hospitalised. His condition deteriorates and he fears for his life, so he asks Terese to take over Maxine's payments. Karl discovers Brad has been poisoned with arsenic, which was added to Ned's tattoo ink. Maxine asks for more money and threatens to tell everyone the truth, but Brad refuses to pay. Brad and Lauren marry. Immediately afterwards Lauren learns of Brad's secret payments to Maxine. Following Ned's arrest for arson, Brad and Lauren cancel their honeymoon to stay around to support Ned. After Ned completes his community service, he moves to the Gold Coast for a new job and Brad is saddened to lose him again. He goes with Ned to help him settle in, returning a few weeks later. Brad and Lauren then learn that their granddaughter Matilda is ill and her mother, Lauren's daughter Amber (Jenna Rosenow), had to quit her job to look after her. Lauren and Brad decide to sell up and move to the Gold Coast to join them and to be closer to Ned. After a farewell barbecue, they drive out of Ramsay Street with their family and friends wishing them luck.

== Reception ==
"Brad was unlike any guy Ramsay Street had ever seen before. He was scruffy and aimless, and let's be honest, a bit dumb. But he was terminally cute and he was never going to have any trouble attracting the girls."

— Josephine Monroe, author of the Neighbours Programme Guide (1994)

For his portrayal of Brad, Michaelson was nominated for Most Popular Actor at the 1993 Logie Awards. That same year saw the actor nominated for Hottest Man in Soap and Brad nominated for Best Male Character at the Inside Soap TV Awards. A writer for the BBC said Brad's most notable moment was "Being shot by Bob Landers." While a reporter for the Herald Sun called Brad "one of the show's most popular characters" and commented that Michaelson had a huge following because of his "blonde surfer looks." Tony Johnston stated that Brad was quite a catch and a What's on TV columnist named him one of "The Top 100 Soap Hunks of All Time". During an article about water sports, Lynda Moyo of Body Confidential believed the outer physiques of surfers "tend to be like that of Brad Willis off Neighbours. Remember him? He was the Erinsborough surf hunk with a board for a brain." Upon Brad's arrival on Irish television, the TV Guide stated he "makes an immediate impact in Ramsay Street."

When Brad's cousin Cameron asked Lucy out, the Daily Mirror's TV critic Tony Pratt stated: "Brad kicks himself for not declaring his interest. No use telling Brad now, of course, but you have the feeling that somehow, sometime, somewhere he and Lucy will get their silly selves sorted out." Diana Hollingsworth of Soaplife said Brad "wasn't too hot in the brains department and hadn't sussed that Beth was in love – with him." Andrew Mercado branded Brad "a dirty dog" for his affair with Lauren. During a feature on Neighbours, Anna Pickard of The Guardian tried to choose the characters she would be most starstruck by if she met them. She wrote "It would have to be the Willis family. All of them. Pam, Doug, Adam, Gaby, Brad and Cody". A writer for All About Soap placed Brad and Beth's first wedding at number fifteen on their twenty greatest soap weddings list. The writer commented "Dimwit surf dude Brad couldn't keep his hands off neighbour Lauren Carpenter prior to his wedding to good girl Beth. Come the big day, with friends and family assembled on the beach, Brad decided the time was right to reveal he'd been playing around. Fool."

Catrin Griffiths of the Daily Express included Brad and Beth's weddings in her 25 Years of Erinsborough's Most Memorable Weddings list. While a writer for SOAP magazine called the couple "the new Scott and Charlene". Nicky Branagh from Studentbeans.com included Brad in her list of the "Top ten hottest Aussie soap guys" and she stated "Brad Willis was *the* hunk on the street. Perhaps it was the hoop earring, his surfer dude charm or the way he wore those fetching baseball caps. Whatever the reason, Brad had the ladies a-swooning. I guess you just can't argue with a jaw like that." When Brad learned Paige was his daughter, Laura Morgan from All About Soap observed, "We all know Mr Willis isn't the most emotional guy, but he was obviously over the moon to discover Paige was his own flesh and blood."
