= Kyle Canning =

Fictional character from the Australian soap opera Neighbours

- Neighbours character
- Portrayed by: Chris Milligan
- Duration: 2008–2016, 2019–2022
- First appearance: 26 November 2008
- Last appearance: 28 July 2022
- Introduced by: Susan Bower (2008); Jason Herbison (2019)
- Spin-off appearances: Neighbours vs Zombies (2014)
In-universe information
- Occupation: Student; Barman; Car salesman; Handyman
- Father: Gary Canning
- Mother: Sharon Canning
- Half-sisters: Xanthe Canning
- Wife: Georgia Brooks (2014–2019); Roxy Willis (2022–)
- Sons: Jett Canning
- Grandfathers: Frank Canning
- Grandmothers: Sheila Canning
- Aunts: Naomi Canning
- First cousins: Dane Canning; Harley Canning; Levi Canning

Kyle Canning is a fictional character from the Australian soap opera Neighbours, played by Chris Milligan. The actor successfully auditioned for the six-week recurring role of Kyle and he made his first on screen appearance on 26 November 2008. Milligan was later asked back every couple of months to do a few weeks filming. After eighteen months of playing Kyle on a part-time basis, Milligan was given a full-time contract deal and he and his character were promoted to the regular cast. Milligan said he was ecstatic about his promotion and looked forward to developing his character further. In August 2011, Milligan had to be written out of Neighbours temporarily so he could recover from an injury he sustained off screen.

Kyle was initially portrayed as an immature bad boy, whose physical presence made him fall into the role of a bully. However, his low academic intelligence made him vulnerable to people smarter than himself. A traumatic accident and his struggle to secure employment changed Kyle's ways. The character has been described as a larrikin, good hearted and laid back. Following his promotion to the regular cast, the show's writers gave Kyle some character traits similar to Henry Ramsay (Craig McLachlan). Like Henry, Kyle becomes the handyman of Ramsay Street and he later opens his own business, which brings him into contact with many of the street's residents.

Kyle's storylines have often focused on his various relationships and jobs. Kyle engaged in a brief relationship with Natasha Williams (Valentina Novakovic) and developed a crush on Kate Ramsay (Ashleigh Brewer). He later entered into a casual relationship with Jade Mitchell (Gemma Pranita), which turned serious. Following Jade's departure, Kyle began dating Georgia Brooks (Saskia Hampele) and they later married. Other storylines for Kyle have seen him blackmailed by a corrupt police officer and temporarily damaging his eyesight by looking at the sun during an eclipse. Milligan chose to leave Neighbours in 2015 and Kyle departed on 8 April 2016 with Georgia. He made a brief return from 15 to 20 September 2016, and returned to the cast full-time on 2 April 2019. Milligan and Zima Anderson, who plays Kyle's wife Roxy Willis, departed the serial on 5 May 2022. Milligan returned as part of the serial's final episodes. The character has been well received by critics and Milligan was nominated for Best Daytime Star at the Inside Soap Awards in 2012 and 2014.

== Casting ==
On 20 October 2008, a reporter for The Courier-Mail announced Milligan had landed a recurring role on Neighbours. The actor won the part of Kyle following a successful audition. Milligan said securing the role had made moving away from his family and relocating to Melbourne worth the sacrifice. He made his first screen appearance as Kyle on 26 November 2008. In March 2011, Milligan revealed to TV Week that he initially had a six-week guest role as Kyle, but he was then asked back every couple of months for a few weeks' filming. After eighteen months of playing Kyle on a part-time basis, Milligan was promoted to the regular cast and given a full-time contract deal. His promotion came as the show lost two male cast members; Erin Mullally and Scott McGregor. Milligan told Daniel Kilkelly of Digital Spy that he was "ecstatic" when he heard about his promotion and quipped "Kyle had been a guest character for nearly three years so it's great to be full-time now and to be able to evolve the character."

On 9 August 2011, Milligan snapped his Achilles tendon while playing football and had to be written out of the soap. The actor took a break from Neighbours for around five weeks and the writers were forced to rewrite scenes which featured his character. Executive producer Susan Bower said "We've rewritten some scenes which explain Kyle's absence, and as a former nurse, I'll be monitoring his rehabilitation." A few days later, it was announced Luke Pegler had joined the cast to fill in for Milligan and take over a planned storyline for his character. On 13 September 2011, a Channel 5 writer reported Milligan had returned to the set in time to film the final episodes of the 2011 season. Milligan was still using crutches and a writer for the Herald Sun said his injury would be worked into his storylines. Of his return, Milligan said "After a month of virtually sitting on the couch, I'm rapt to be back at work. I just have to pace myself a bit."

== Development ==
=== Characterisation ===
"Kyle is an example of a character we started as a guest and we developed, and could see how much the audience liked him. Plus we had time to really define the character. We have lots in store for Kyle. We see him as our resident bogan."

— Susan Bower on Kyle (2011)

When Kyle first joined Neighbours, he was an immature "bad boy", who often hung around with school bullies, Justin Hunter (Chris Toohey) and Shane Gregory (Ryan Bate). Channel 5 said Kyle's physical presence made him fall easily into the role of a bully and eventual group leader, but his low academic intelligence made him vulnerable to people smarter than himself. Following a traumatic rafting accident on a school trip and his struggle to find employment, Kyle decided to change as he did not want to be the same person anymore. Milligan said his character had a "good heart" and that he was forced to learn things for himself, as he had not had the right people around to show him the way. Kyle has been described as being a "trouble maker", a larrikin and "loveable-but-slightly-hopeless." The official Neighbours website said Kyle was the "local hottie", who was hard to take seriously, though his heart was in the right place. Kyle was also a "good-time guy", who developed a thirst for adventure.

Shortly before Kyle's promotion to regular character was announced, TV Soap reported the Neighbours writers were going to give Kyle some Henry Ramsay-like traits. Of this, executive producer Susan Bower explained "He was at school with the gang and he's been back and forwards quite a lot, and we certainly feel that he has a future for the show - in much the same way as Henry Ramsay was sort of the handyman around the place. We've got some good plans for him." Kyle has been employed at both Charlie's and Erinsborough Motors, but he had dreams of opening his own handyman business. During an interview with Digital Spy in June 2011, Milligan revealed Kyle would eventually start his own handyman business, which would bring him into contact with all of the Ramsay Street residents. Kyle later became involved in a storyline that saw his business threatened by the development of a new shopping complex. Milligan said Kyle was "pretty laid-back" and would become an unexpected friend to some of the characters. In August 2011, Bower told Daniel Kilkelly of Digital Spy, that Kyle was a guy with double standards, who "goes out and shags indiscriminately, but the girl he wants to marry has to be an angel." She revealed the writers were going to challenge this aspect of the character.

=== Family ===
In May 2011, Milligan stated that it would be fun to see some of Kyle's friends and family introduced to the soap. Following an injury in early August, Milligan was forced to take a break from filming and Luke Pegler was brought in and cast as Dane Canning, Kyle's cousin. Dane arrives in Erinsborough to take over Kyle's room at Number 26 and look after his business, while he goes to care for his sick mother. Dane and Kyle have similar personalities and Pegler revealed that he spoke to Milligan about finding "some common ground" for their characters. Pegler stated that Dane and Kyle come from the same place and have developed the same habits. He quipped that they both have "bravado", while being softies underneath. Pegler later commented that Dane has "Canning DNA" and is just as oblivious to things around him as Kyle is. Milligan hoped that Pegler would return as Kyle's cousin as he was "fantastic to work with" and his character was popular with viewers. He added "Now the Canning family is expanding, hopefully that will include a cousin or two coming to stay."

In January 2012, new executive producer Richard Jasek revealed that Kyle's grandmother was being cast and it was later announced that Colette Mann had received the role of Sheila Canning. Sheila comes to Erinsborough to make a surprise visit to Kyle, but after she meets his neighbours and begins to like the life he has, she decides to stay. Of Kyle's relationship with his grandmother, Milligan told a What's on TV writer "The Cannings are a very close, working-class family and his gran rules the roost. He adores her, but also knows that he needs to keep a tight rein on her when it comes to him making his own decisions. She is also quick to judge people." Milligan said that Sheila does not approve of his relationship with Jade Mitchell (Gemma Pranita) as she perceives her "independence as arrogance".

The Canning family was expanded again in late 2012 with the introduction of Kyle's cousin Harley (Justin Holborow). A Channel 5 website writer stated that Harley shares the same good looks as Kyle, but he does not share the same moral compass. Harley turns up in Ramsay Street in the back of a police car, which shocks Kyle. However, in a bid to show how responsible he has become, Kyle decides to take Harley in. He then learns that Harley has been in trouble with the law before and becomes determined to help him.

=== Relationships ===
==== Kate Ramsay ====
"Any action for Kyle is good action, but deep down he wants a girlfriend - even though he still likes to put on a bit of a show."

— Milligan on Kyle's love life (2011)

In January 2010, Kyle goes on a date with Kate Ramsay (Ashleigh Brewer). Kyle asks Kate whether she accepted his offer because she is trying to make Declan Napier (James Sorensen) jealous, but Kate denies it and tells Kyle she wants to get to know him better. Declan is not happy and when he sees Kate and Kyle together and he sabotages the date. In May 2011, Milligan revealed Kyle has always liked Kate because she is nice and is unlike the other girls he has dated in the past. Milligan said while Kyle like her, he would never push Kate into liking him. When Kyle sees Kate has been hurt by her ex-boyfriend, Mark Brennan (Scott McGregor), he feels protective towards her.

Kyle worries about competing with Mark for Kate's affections, as he is not as intelligent and successful as him. Kyle also knows Kate is very smart, which further dents his confidence. When Mark learns Kyle is interested in Kate, he asks her out, but is later forced to postpone the date. Kyle decides to take advantage of the situation and invites Kate to spend the evening watching films with him. Kate accepts and enjoys the time she spends with Kyle. Mark later accuses Kate of trying to make him jealous and Kate decides to put him behind her, by agreeing to go on an official date with Kyle. When asked who he thought the right woman for Kyle is, Milligan said "That's a hard one. He and Kate would make a nice couple, but I think he needs someone who is going to challenge him."

==== Natasha Williams ====
Following her split from Andrew Robinson (Jordan Patrick Smith), Natasha Williams (Valentina Novakovic) starts dating Kyle. The following month, she decides to dump him, but to her surprise, Kyle gets there first. TV Soap explained Natasha grows bored of Kyle's company, but Kyle also becomes bored with his younger girlfriend and he "wastes no time severing their ties." Kyle's actions embarrass Natasha and he agrees to let her pretend that she dumped him. She then lies to Andrew that "she's kicked Kyle to the curb", instead of the other way around.

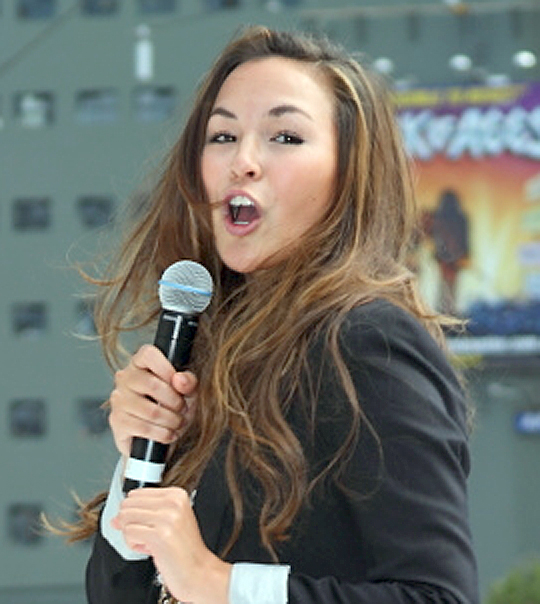
Kyle fell in love with his housemate Jade Mitchell (played by Gemma Pranita).

==== Jade Mitchell ====
When asked who she would like to see her character, Jade Mitchell, find love with, Gemma Pranita suggested Kyle. Pranita thought Jade and Kyle's "contrasting personalities" would work together if they entered a relationship. She explained "I think the characters can learn a lot from each other. Jade is very worldly and smart and Kyle has a more simple and uncomplicated nature." Kyle and Jade share a house together and on the night of their housewarming party they kiss, which thrills Jade. However, Kyle still sees her as a friend. Kyle and Jade later have sex together and Kyle suggests they engage in a friends with benefits arrangement, to which Jade agrees. During a feature on soap couples that should be together, Inside Soap said Kyle should give up lusting after Kate and realise Jade is "The One". The magazine opined that while neither of them has had a relationship for more than twenty-four hours, it does put them on an even playing field.

When Jade was given a chance to work in the United States, she and Kyle began a long-distance relationship. Upon her return to Erinsborough, Jade invited Kyle to accompany her back to the US. However, after learning that Jade would be away for a year, Kyle made it clear that his life was in Erinsborough. A devastated Kyle then decided to break up with Jade, even though he still loved her.

==== Georgia Brooks ====
When Kyle supported Georgia Brooks (Saskia Hampele) through a tough time at work, she began to question her relationship and future with Scotty Boland (Rhys Uhlich). When Georgia decided to spend the afternoon at a fundraising barbecue with Kyle, instead of being with Scotty she felt guilty. Hampele said Kyle was a distraction for Georgia. When Georgia has a good time at the fundraiser, she realised there was an attraction. When Georgia made a quick exit from the fundraiser, Kyle got confused and thought she had developed a crush on his house mate Rhys Lawson (Ben Barber). Believing that her feelings for Rhys would lead her to have her heart broken, Kyle urged Georgia to stay with Scotty. Hampele quipped that Georgia liked Kyle and thought he felt the same way, so it came as "a blow to her" when he pushed her away. Georgia and Kyle continued to hide their feelings for each other and Kyle dated Jana Noviac (Kyrie Capri). Milligan commented that Kyle did not go out looking for Jana, but she sort of appeared and made Georgia jealous.

Georgia later ended her relationship with Scotty. When asked if Kyle would "step up to the plate", Milligan stated "I think he's almost scared by his feelings for Georgia. He's one of those guys that when he gets a girl he thinks is right, he wants to marry her." When Kyle came to Georgia's place to fix the pool, she offered to put some sunscreen on his back and TV Week's Thomas Mitchell declared that "the electricity is off the grid!". However, Georgia's aunt, Angie (Lesley Baker), interrupted them. Georgia got back together with Scotty and they became engaged. However, when Kyle learned that Scotty had made sexual advances towards Chris Pappas (James Mason), he told Georgia the truth and Scotty left town. Milligan told an Inside Soap writer that Kyle had "a knack for finding the most complicated girls." Kyle and Georgia eventually began dating when Kyle helped Georgia clear her name after she was accused of stealing drugs from the hospital. When they believed their relationship was in a good place, Kyle and Georgia had sex with each other for the first time.

=== Blackmail ===
When Kyle decides to hold a sale at the car yard to bring in extra revenue, it attracts the attention of Constable Wes Holland (Daniel Hamill). Wes demands money from Kyle in return for providing security for the event. Kyle is stunned and Milligan told Inside Soap that he does not know how to react. The actor explained "Holland makes it clear that if Kyle doesn't pay up, big trouble will come his way - and how do you respond to that?" Kyle is shaken up by the confrontation with Wes and he turns to Kate, who advises him to speak to Mark. Kyle is reluctant because of his history with the detective. However, when Kyle returns to the car yard to remove the sale signs, he gets another visit from Wes. The officer gets physical with Kyle and threatens to destroy his stock. Kyle then decides to go to Mark for help. Kyle explains the situation to Mark, but the story is not very believable. Milligan said "At first it isn't easy for them to work together because it's hard for Kyle to seek help off someone he's already had problems with, and he knows how Brennan feels about him - plus it's another cop, so he isn't convinced that Brennan will believe him." Mark is under the impression Wes is a trusted colleague, so he decides to get proof before he believes Kyle. Mark finds the evidence he needs and he and Kyle confront Wes. When asked if the situation would be a turning point for Kyle and Mark, Milligan said that it was. He added while they would not become best friends, they would not be enemies either.

=== Temporary blindness ===
During a solar eclipse, Kyle looked up at the sun, which caused him to go temporarily blind. While enjoying a spa with Georgia, Kyle's dog, Bossy, stole his safety glasses and he decided to look directly at the eclipse. Kyle damaged his retinas and Georgia quickly rushed him to the hospital, where he was told that he had to wear eye patches. Kyle was then forced to rely on those around him, causing him to become frustrated. When Kyle started to miss his independence, his housemate, Chris invited him down to the car yard to help out. Milligan explained "He needs to get out of the house. Everyone is on his case trying to help him out, but Kyle pushes them away. Chris invites him down to the car yard, and Kyle will take anything to get out of that little bubble. Chris is being a good mate and trying to offer Kyle something to do. But even Chris gets to a point where he tells Kyle he needs to rest." Realising Chris does not want him around, Kyle stormed off and put himself in danger by walking onto a busy intersection and into the path of an oncoming car. Chris managed to rescue Kyle in time and dragged him back to the pavement.

=== Departure and return ===
In April 2015, Milligan's co-star and then partner Jenna Rosenow told Noel Murphy of The Weekly Review that she and Milligan were set to leave Neighbours later that year to pursue careers in Los Angeles. In March 2016, Daniel Kilkelly (Digital Spy) confirmed Milligan had left the show and added that Kyle would be on-screen for "a few more weeks." Kilkelly also reported that Milligan filmed his final scenes at the end of 2015. Kyle made his final appearance on 8 April 2016. His exit storyline saw him reunite with Georgia, before being caught up in an explosion at Lassiter's Hotel. After surviving the disaster, Kyle decides to "put his own happiness first" and leaves Ramsay Street with Georgia, who has secured a nursing job in Europe.

Kyle made a brief return from 15 September 2016. Milligan said that he always knew he would come back to finish Kyle's storyline off properly, before making the move to Los Angeles permanent. Kyle returns to Erinsborough for Sheila's 60th birthday, and to check that his father is "doing the right thing" by his sister. Xanthe is the first to realise that Kyle is back, after some of Sheila's gnomes go missing and she sets a trap for the thief. Sheila is delighted to see Kyle and have her family together again, but he is not pleased to see that Gary has been released from prison and welcomed back. After speaking with Toadie, Kyle is prepared to give his father a second chance. When Sheila asks him how long he is planning on staying for, Kyle makes it clear that he wants to leave before Amy returns. However, Kyle and Amy later come face to face, and she ends up "lashing out" at Kyle because he does not acknowledge how much he hurt her and Jimmy by leaving. Amy decides to move out of the Canning house, leading Jimmy to confront Kyle for disrupting their lives.

=== Reintroduction ===
Milligan later reprised the role full time, and he returned during the episode broadcast on 2 April 2019. Kyle returns to Erinsborough and interrupts his father proposing to his former girlfriend Amy Williams (Zoe Cramond). Cramond described the moment as "weird" and explained, "Kyle turns up out of the blue. No one knows he is coming, even Sheila – who usually knows everything! Amy can tell that something is going on." Kyle reveals that he has returned as Paul has offered him Amy's former job of overseeing the Robinson Pines housing development, which means they will have to work together during a handover period. Gary suspects that Paul wants to try and get Kyle and Amy back together, and Amy does not believe her father when he tells her that is not the case. Kyle also explains that he and Georgia have separated.

=== Departure ===
On 14 March 2022, Kilkelly (Digital Spy) confirmed that Milligan would be departing Neighbours, alongside Zima Anderson, who plays Kyle's wife, Roxy Willis, in episodes broadcast at UK pace in April. Their departures were already planned and written before it was announced that the serial was ending later in the year. Later details confirmed that the couple would leave during the episode broadcast on 12 April in the UK and on 5 May 2022 in Australia. Before they leave for Darwin, Kyle and Roxy learn they are expecting their first child. Their departures also lead to the arrival of a new family on Ramsay Street, as Sheila sells Number 26. Milligan later reprised his role alongside Anderson for the serial's finale.

== Storylines ==
=== 2008–2016 ===
Shortly after moving to Erinsborough, Kyle befriends school bullies Justin Hunter and Shane Gregory. Kyle invites Zeke Kinski (Matthew Werkmeister) to join them when they decide to skip school. Principal Andrew Simpson (Peter Flanigan) bans pranks on muck-up day and suspends the boys when they run through the school wearing balaclavas and spraying silly string. During a school rafting trip, Kyle and Justin cause their raft to capsize during a prank, throwing them and Zeke, Bridget Parker (Eloise Mignon) and Libby Kennedy (Michala Banas) into the river. Zeke goes missing and Kyle is traumatised by the accident. Kyle agrees to pose as Zeke's radio personality, Lost Boy, to keep Sunny Lee (Hany Lee) from discovering the truth. He also bullies Harry Ramsay (Will Moore) and goes to the debutante ball with Donna Freedman (Margot Robbie). Libby later learns Kyle has been blackmailing Sunny into writing his English essays. Months later, Kyle asks Kate Ramsay on a date. The date ends when Kyle fights with Declan. Kyle gets a job at Charlie's bar and briefly dates Natasha Williams. Kyle gets a trial at Lou Carpenter's (Tom Oliver) second hand car business. He realises Lou does not trust him to close a sale and he quits. He later returns when Lou apologies.

When Kyle suffers financial trouble, he is given a job with Jade Mitchell. Kyle accidentally exposes his buttocks while changing in his car and Mark Brennan charges him with indecent exposure. The fine leaves Kyle without money for rent and Jade fires him. Kate decides to help by employing him at Harold's for the day. Kyle and Kate go on another date. Kyle is blackmailed by corrupt police officer Wes Holland and he asks Brennan for help. The next time Wes turns up, Brennan arrests him. Kyle moves into Lyn Scully's (Janet Andrewartha) spare room and later rents the house from her. He asks Jade to move in with him and when they struggle with the rent, Brennan moves in. Kyle quits his job and sets up a handyman business, which Lou invests in. Kyle and Jade kiss at their house warming party and begin a casual relationship. When Brennan leaves, Kyle and Jade let Michelle Tran (HaiHa Le) move in, but they soon get fed up of her behaviour. Michelle leaves when Rhys Lawson (Ben Barber) poses as a property inspector and tells her she needs to pay for damages to the house. Kyle invites Rhys to move in and he dates Rhys's colleague Danielle Paquette (Georgia Bolton).

When Kyle learns a new shopping complex is being built in Erinsborough, he realises it could ruin his new business. The company behind the development offer Kyle a large amount of money for his business, but he refuses to sell. Kyle tells Jade he has feelings for her, but she rejects him. He then goes to Frankston to care for his sick mother. When Kyle returns, Jade opens up to him about her commitment issues. The moment is ruined when Kyle discovers she had an affair with Malcolm Kennedy (Benjamin McNair). When Jade tells him she loves him, Kyle walks away. But he later chases her to Melbourne and they become a couple. Kyle's grandmother, Sheila, comes to visit and tells Kyle that she does not think Jade is the right girl for him and he should be with Kate. When Kyle asks Kate to pose as his girlfriend to help woo some potential clients for Dial-A-Kyle, they end up kissing. Kate tells Jade about the kiss and Jade throws Kyle out. Sheila urges Kyle to win Jade back, admitting that she was wrong to encourage Kate to pursue him. Jade tells Kyle she still loves him and they get back together. Kyle takes his cousin Harley in. Kyle encourages Jade to take a job opportunity in Los Angeles and they break-up.

Unable to deal with Harley's bad behaviour, Kyle asks Sheila to take him back to Frankston. Chris Pappas moves in, as does Sheila. Kyle develops feelings for Georgia Brooks even though she is in a relationship with Scotty Boland. He briefly dates Jana Noviac, but realises that he does not have a connection with her. Kyle tells Georgia that Scotty made sexual advances towards Chris and Scotty leaves town. Georgia later asks Kyle on a date and when she is fired from her job, Kyle stands by her. He later arranges for Scotty to talk to Georgia so she can move on with her life. Kyle is temporarily blinded when he looks at the sun during an eclipse. During a break from Georgia, he has a one-night stand with Kate. She later has a pregnancy scare, but learns that she has premature ovarian failure instead. Seeing that her boyfriend is not supporting her, Kyle takes it upon himself to be there for Kate. Kyle and Georgia get engaged. Georgia's cousin Gemma Reeves (Kathryn Beck) arrives and manages to cause tension between Georgia and Kyle. She later reveals Kyle and Kate's one-night stand to Georgia, who ends the engagement. Kate tells Kyle she loves him and they try dating, but Kyle realises he loves Georgia and ends it. Kyle learns Georgia is pregnant and manages to convince her to stay in Erinsborough by proving that he is able to take care of her and the baby financially. Georgia suffers a miscarriage and she rejects all comfort from Kyle. They reconcile after Kate's death, realising that life is too short. Kyle proposes to Georgia for the second time and she accepts. Kyle bans Sheila from his wedding when she falls out with his aunt Naomi (Morgana O'Reilly). When he learns that they have fallen out because Naomi kissed Toadfish Rebecchi (Ryan Moloney), he apologises to Sheila. Kyle and Georgia briefly fall out when Bossy is bitten by a snake during a walk with Georgia. The veterinary treatment is very expensive, and sets their wedding plans back. Georgia learns she has a large nodule on her throat and Kyle encourages her to have surgery to remove it. While she recovers, Kyle moves in with her to support her. When a tornado hits Erinsborough, Kyle goes to Lassiter's to help board up windows, leaving Georgia alone with Bossy. When he learns that they have gone missing, he heads out searching for them, and goes missing himself. Georgia and Bossy later find Kyle trapped in a portable toilet.

Kyle and Georgia marry. Weeks later, Kyle discovers that Sheila is in contact with his father Gary (Damien Richardson), who has been absent in his life since he was eight. Georgia convinces Gary to meet with Kyle. Gary tells Kyle that he left as he was being threatened by a pair of criminals after witnessing an armed robbery. Kyle begins to accept him back into the family, until Gary assaults Ezra Hanley (Steve Nation) and goes to jail. Sheila suffers a heart attack. When she comes home, Kyle worries that she is working too hard, and he briefly works alongside her in the pub. Kyle asks Georgia to try for another baby and she agrees. However, she later tells him that she has not stopped taking the pill, as she is scared of miscarrying again. They agree to wait. Kyle defends and supports Georgia when Nick Petrides (Damien Fotiou) tries to seduce her for a bet and then sabotages her career. Georgia helps Kyle to win a contract for the council's beautification project. Georgia leaves for Germany to be with her mother, who is undergoing treatment for cancer, while Kyle remains behind until his work for the council is completed. Kyle clashes with Amy Williams, but soon employs her at Dial-A-Kyle to help with the beautification project. Feeling tired, Kyle buys some supplements from Josh Willis (Harley Bonner), but he soon collapses. Karl informs him that he had an allergic reaction, while Josh apologises for selling him the supplements. Paul fires Kyle when he fails to stand up for Amy after she is sexually harassed. After Kyle agrees to file a formal complaint at Amy's request, Paul gives him his job back.

Kyle bonds with Amy's son Jimmy, becoming a father figure to him. He also begins to develop feelings for Amy, causing tensions between the two. Georgia returns from Germany and admits she regrets getting married, having developed an emotional connection to another man while she was away. She tells a heartbroken Kyle that they should have a year apart, and then decide if they want to resume their marriage. Kyle later considers pursuing a relationship with Amy, but her ex-husband Liam Barnett returns, intending to fix his relationship with his wife and son. When Liam's illegal dealings put Jimmy in danger, Paul blackmails him into leaving town, which Jimmy witnesses and confides in Kyle. Sheila invites Amy and Jimmy to move in with her and Kyle, and Kyle and Amy later get together. Kyle is shocked when Xanthe arrives, claiming to be his half-sister, and Gary confirms this. With Xanthe's mother missing, Sheila decides to take her in, but Kyle struggles to get along with her. Georgia sends Kyle a letter on his birthday, but he decides not to read it as he wants to be with Amy. Gary is up for parole and Kyle warns him not to let Xanthe down, as a result of which he botches his parole by getting into a fight with another inmate, upsetting Xanthe. Kyle later discovers Amy read Georgia's letter, and is furious to discover she has been keeping this a secret, particularly when he learns that Georgia wants him back. Kyle meets Georgia at Lassiter's Hotel and she tells him that she wants him back. They share a kiss, which is seen by Amy. She flees the room and Kyle chases after her. Amy and Kyle become stuck in the lift when the boiler room explodes, and Kyle receives an electric shock while trying to find a way out. He regains consciousness and they are rescued, and Amy, believing Kyle wants to be with Georgia, tells him to go to Germany with his wife. Kyle says his goodbyes to Amy, Jimmy, Sheila and Xanthe before leaving for Germany with Bossy.

Kyle returns a few months later for Sheila's 60th birthday. He is initially hostile towards Gary, but after talking with Toadie, he spends time with his father. Kyle is also vague when asked about Georgia, but then tells Sheila that they have been having some issues. Kyle asks Amy to meet him, so they can talk. He asks her if they can be friends, but Amy is still angry at the way Kyle left her and Jimmy, prompting her to move out of Number 26. Stephanie Scully (Carla Bonner) points out that Kyle broke Amy's heart and should not expect to return and think everything is okay. Kyle catches up with Susan Kennedy (Jackie Woodburne) to thank her for supporting Xanthe. Jimmy comes to collect his chess set and he tells Kyle to leave his mother alone. He then gives Kyle a hug to give to Bossy. At Sheila's party, Amy agrees to be friends with Kyle and they sort out the sale of the business. She also encourages Kyle to call Georgia. He then says goodbye to his family and friends, before leaving for the airport.

=== 2019–2022 ===
Kyle returns to Erinsborough three years later, and walks in on Gary proposing to Amy. Kyle explains that he and Georgia have broken up, and he is taking over Amy's job as project manager on the Robinson Pines development. Paul tells Kyle that he brought him back to split Gary and Amy up, as he does not think Gary is good enough for her. He explains that Gary owes Amy a large amount of money, and that he moved stolen goods and accidentally knocked out Dipi Rebecchi (Sharon Johal) in an attempt to pay her back. While Paul waits for an answer, Kyle questions Dipi about the accident and speaks with Amy, who tells him that Gary makes her happy. Kyle accepts the job, but tells Paul that he will not try and break Amy and Gary up. Kyle later moves in with Aaron Brennan (Matt Wilson), his husband David Tanaka (Takaya Honda) and sister, Chloe Brennan (April Rose Pengilly), who Kyle immediately gets along with. Kyle and Amy shorten their hand over period and work together on the budget for the development. Amy initially keeps the fact that she and Kyle worked all night from Gary, causing tension between them all.

During a party at Number 32, Kyle tells Leo Tanaka (Tim Kano) that he ended his marriage to Georgia. Kyle and Chloe flirt and kiss at the party, and they begin a casual relationship. Sheila soon discovers that Kyle broke up with Georgia because he still loves Amy. Chloe reveals that Paul has been paying her to stay away from Kyle, but she kept the money and dated him anyway. Chloe later ends the relationship, and Kyle declares his feelings for Amy. When Gary learns Kyle still loves Amy, he brings their wedding forward, but Amy reacts badly and leaves town for a few days. Gary and Kyle's relationship is strained. Chloe encourages Kyle to enter a bid for Karl's tram renovation, after he puts it out to tender. Karl chooses both Kyle and Gary, forcing them to work together. They struggle to get along due to Gary's jealously over Kyle's feelings for Amy. Kyle suffers a mild concussion after falling from some scaffolding, which Gary insisted on putting up by himself. Kyle tells Sheila that he is going to leave town once the tram is finished.

Eventually, Amy and Gary break up after Amy realises she wants to be with Kyle, and he decides to stay in town. Their relationship is strained when a tape of them having sex in a Lassiter's hotel room is leaked to the media by Scarlett Brady (Christie Whelan Browne). Consequently, Kyle decides to launch a class action suit against Lassiters with Toadie's help. He becomes exhausted by the lawsuit, and while driving one night, he accidentally hits David with his ute and leaves the scene. Once he realises he was responsible, he confesses and is charged with reckless driving and failure to render assistance. Paul later attacks him for wanting to donate a kidney to David. When Liam tells Amy that Jimmy has been acting strangely in New York, Kyle video calls Jimmy and has a go at him. Jimmy runs away, causing further strain between Kyle and Amy, even after Jimmy arrives in Erinsborough and explains that he has been protecting his girlfriend. Kyle and Amy consider having children, but Amy eventually decides she does not want any more children, and breaks up with him. After learning that Jimmy misses having her in his life, Amy decides to move to New York indefinitely. Kyle flirts with and later kisses Roxy Willis (Zima Anderson).

Kyle attends Elly Conway's (Jodi Anasta) 35th birthday party on Pierce Greyson's (Tim Robards) island, after falling out with Gary due to his engagement to Prue Wallace (Denise van Outen). He and Roxy have sex on the island. Gary finds out that Prue has deceived him, so he calls off the wedding and goes to the island where he and Kyle reconcile. Gary is murdered by Finn Kelly (Rob Mills) and Kyle is forced to break the news to Sheila and Xanthe. He decides to move back in with Sheila. When he finds out that Gary was killed by an arrow, he feels guilt after recalling that he asked Toadie to leave his archery set behind. Kyle finds comfort in Roxy, who has been supporting him. Kyle attempts to ask Roxy out, but fails to. He attends a grief support group with Sheila and meets Jessica Quince (Lynn Gilmartin), with whom he has a casual relationship with. Kyle and Roxy fall out and Roxy goes to Darwin. Kyle later breaks up with Jessica, realising that he has feelings for Roxy. When Roxy returns, Kyle tells Roxy that he broke up with Jessica, as he wants a relationship with her. Sheila disapproves of Kyle dating Roxy and attempts to set him up with various other women, but Kyle makes it clear that he wants to be with Roxy. His cousin Levi Canning (Richie Morris) transfers to Erinsborough and moves in with Kyle and Sheila. Kyle later learns that Roxy and Levi kissed, which makes him doubt whether they can be together. Kyle volunteers to help clean up the island, but when he starts to struggle being there, Roxy comforts him. She tells him that she needs a real reason why they cannot be together. Kyle realises he does not have one and they finally start a relationship. Roxy then asks Kyle to tell Sheila.

During a family barbecue, Sheila confess to Levi that the men who attacked him when he was a child were actually looking for Kyle. This causes a rift between Levi, Sheila and Kyle. Levi moves out to a hotel, as he feels unable to forgive his grandmother for protecting Kyle. Kyle tries to reason with Levi, which gets into a physical fight, but Bea stops them. Levi eventually moves back in and forgives Sheila. When Sheila began to do thing for Levi, Kyle become jealous of their bond and pretends to be sick to get Sheila's attention. Kyle admits to Sheila that he was jealous and Sheila tells him that he will always be her favourite no matter what. Kyle later witnesses Shane Rebecchi (Nicholas Coghlan) violently grab Roxy by the arm and he intervenes. Kyle is furious of Shane's behaviour towards Roxy and confronts him for hurting Roxy in front of Dipi. Kyle then tells Shane to stay away from Roxy.

== Reception ==
A writer for Holy Soap said Kyle's most memorable moment was "When he thought he had killed Zeke in the raft race disaster." Of Kyle's early appearances, Sarah Ellis of Inside Soap observed "He's single, good-looking and employed – plus he's got his own wheels. What more could a woman want from a fella?" A What's on TV reporter called Kyle a "lovable troublemaker", while a Channel 5 writer thought he was a "cheeky chappy." A reporter from the Daily Record called Kyle a "wannabe-Romeo" during his pursuit of Kate. Another reporter said he was a "lovable idiot", which made him irresistible to Jade. Sarah Ellis of Inside Soap wondered how long Kyle and Jade's friends with benefits deal would last until they saw what the rest of the world could. Following the news of the serial's cancellation, Sheena McGinley of the Irish Independent ranked Kyle the sixth best character, saying, "Kyle Canning has been through it all during his 14-year stint on the show. The thug stage, the redemptive stage, the ‘I’m channelling my rage into cheffing’ stage. Then, he got testicular cancer and is now at the post-bilateral-orchiectomy stage of proceedings. Given the show is set to cease filming in June of this year, only time will tell if he’ll get to enjoy a fitful future with Roxy."

In October 2011, another reporter from the Daily Record praised Kyle's promotion to regular cast member, saying "whoever decided to bring him in on a permanent basis deserves a big pat on the back." The reporter added that Kyle had been a breath of fresh air ever since he moved into Ramsay Street. Cameron Adams of the Herald Sun called Jade and Kyle's relationship "bumpy" and he praised Milligan for not letting his torn Achilles stop his character from hobbling around on crutches. In 2012, Milligan was nominated for Best Daytime Star at the Inside Soap Awards. He received a nomination in the same category in 2014. In 2021, Kyle was placed fourth in a poll ran via soap fansite "Back To The Bay", which asked readers to determine the top ten most popular Neighbours characters. In a feature profiling the "top 12 iconic Neighbours characters", critic Sheena McGinley of the Irish Independent placed Kyle as her sixth choice. She assessed that the character had "been through it all" during his fourteen years in the show. She described his transformation from "the thug stage, the redemptive stage, the 'I'm channelling my rage into cheffing' stage."
