= Jenna Rosenow =

Australian actress (born 1991)

- Born: 5 January 1991 (age 35); Brisbane, Queensland, Australia
- Occupation: Actress
- Years active: 2009–present
- Partner: Charles Michael Davis (2023-present)

Jenna Rosenow (born 5 January 1991) is an Australian television and film actress. After an early recurring role in children's television show Mako: Island of Secrets, Rosenow played Amber Turner in the soap opera Neighbours from 2013 to 2016. During her time in the serial, she received an Inside Soap Award nomination and appeared in the online spin-off Neighbours vs Zombies. After relocating to Los Angeles, Rosenow made guest appearances in Legends of Tomorrow and BH90210. She plays the recurring role of Kimber Watts in the 2021 Netflix drama Firefly Lane, and appears in the mystery drama series One of Us Is Lying.

== Early and personal life ==
Rosenow was born on 5 January 1991. She grew up in Ballarat and attended school there. After her mother enrolled her sister, who has Asperger syndrome, in acting lessons at the Geelong Screen Actors to help with her social skills, Rosenow also fell in love with acting and was enrolled there too. The classes also helped to improve her confidence and she found she had a natural talent for acting. She travelled to Geelong every week for lessons, and her parents eventually moved there when she was 18. Rosenow worked in a gym, a café and in retail, before her acting career began.

In 2015, Rosenow became an ambassador for Seeing Eye Dogs Australia. Rosenow was engaged to fellow actor Chris Milligan whom she met on the set of Neighbours in 2013.

== Career ==
One of Rosenow's earliest roles was a recurring part in children's television show Mako: Island of Secrets. She has also appeared in the television comedy pilot Paper Planes, short film Pale (2010) and feature film Border Protection Squad (2015).

In November 2012, it was announced that Rosenow had joined the main cast of Australian soap opera Neighbours as Amber Turner. Rosenow had previously made an appearance in the serial as an extra. Of the casting process, she commented "It's very exciting. I auditioned for the role and got short-listed and had a call back, then was told I got the role." Rosenow relocated from Geelong to Melbourne, where the show's studios are located, and made her debut as Amber on 7 February 2013. For her work on Neighbours, Rosenow received a nomination for the Inside Soap Award for Best Daytime Star. She was also longlisted for the Logie Award for Most Popular Actress. In 2014, Rosenow played Amber in the web spin-off Neighbours vs Zombies.

After three years of playing Amber, Rosenow decided to leave Neighbours at the conclusion of her contract. She told Noel Murphy of The Weekly Review that she would be moving to Los Angeles to pursue other acting opportunities. She made her final appearance in 2016, as her character took a job opportunity in Queensland. After leaving Neighbours, Rosenow made a guest appearance as Jane Austen in season 4 of The CW's Legends of Tomorrow. She also played Stacy, a fitness influencer and the fictional wife of Ian Ziering in BH90210.

In February 2020, Rosenow joined the cast of Netflix drama Firefly Lane, opposite leads Katherine Heigl and Sarah Chalke. Rosenow plays the recurring role of magazine editor Kimber Watts. Rosenow described Kimber as "a young socialite who is trying to make a name for herself in the journalism world." She said she would bring a bit of comedy to the show and is "a character you're going to love to hate". Rosenow stars in the 2021 Lifetime thriller film Nobody Will Believe You (also known as Pretty Little Victim) with Emily Topper and John William Wright. That same year, Rosenow played college girl Amber in the mystery drama series One of Us Is Lying, which is based on the novel of the same name by Karen M. McManus.

Rosenow co-founded the production company Midnight Madhouse with actor Ella Cannon in 2022. They optioned the non-fiction novel The Tin Ticket by Deborah J. Swiss for a television drama.

== Filmography ==
Year	Title	Role	Notes
2009	Paper Planes	Sex Hair	TV pilot
2010	Pale	Kelly	Short film
2013	Mako: Island of Secrets	Aquata	Recurring role
2013–2016	Neighbours	Amber Turner	Series regular
2014	Neighbours vs Zombies	Amber Turner	Webseries
2015	Border Protection Squad	Female Passenger	Feature film
2019	Legends of Tomorrow	Jane Austen	Episode: "Séance and Sensibility"
2019	BH90210	Stacey	Episode: "The Reunion"
2021	Firefly Lane	Kimber Watts	Recurring role
2021	Nobody Will Believe You	Melanie Baxter	Television film
2021	One of Us Is Lying	Amber	Episode: "Pilot"
