= Chris Milligan =

Australian actor

- Born: Christopher Milligan; 14 June 1988 (age 37); Brisbane, Queensland, Australia
- Occupation: Actor
- Years active: 2008–present

Christopher Milligan (born 14 June 1988) is an Australian actor. From 2008 to 2022, he played Kyle Canning in the television soap opera Neighbours. He initially started out as a recurring cast member, until he was promoted to the regular cast in 2011. He departed the program in 2016 but returned in 2019 until April 2022. He then returned again for the show's final episodes in July 2022. Milligan also played the lead role of David in supernatural fantasy show Dead Gorgeous, and made guest appearances in Rush, The Pacific, Winners & Losers, and Arrow. He appeared in the horror film The Gallows Act II, and reprised his Neighbours role after a three-year absence.

== Career ==
Milligan studied at Melbourne's Film & Television Studio International. In 2008, Milligan began his acting career in the soap opera Neighbours, playing the character of Kyle Canning. In January 2011, it was announced that Milligan would be promoted to regular cast member. In 2009, he played a cameo role as a student on the Australian police drama Rush. In late 2009, Milligan filmed thirteen episodes on the television series Dead Gorgeous in which he played main character, David. He starred as a featured extra in the HBO miniseries The Pacific.

Milligan made guest appearances in Winners & Losers and Arrow. He also played Danny in the feature film Overture. Milligan returned to Neighbours for a brief stint in September 2016. Three years later, he reprised the role on 2 April 2019. Milligan appeared in the American supernatural horror film The Gallows Act II, released on 25 October 2019.

== Personal life ==
Milligan is a former Iona College student. He is a Liverpool supporter. He was previously engaged to actress Jenna Rosenow, after meeting on the set of Neighbours in 2013.

== Filmography ==
=== Film ===
Year	Title	Role	Notes
2011	Overture	Danny	Short film
2014	Kerion	Orik	
2019	The Gallows Act II	Cade Parker	

=== Television ===
Year	Title	Role	Notes
2008–2016, 2019–2022	Neighbours	Kyle Canning	Main cast; 1127 episodes
2009–2010	Rush	Student; Gregory Rainer	2 episodes
2010	Dead Gorgeous	David	Main cast
2010	The Pacific	Marine	TV miniseries (Uncredited role)
2011	Winners & Losers	Liam McMahon	Episode: "Those People in the Paper"
2018	Arrow	Jason Stent	Episode: "Inmate 4587"
