= Priya Kapoor =

- Neighbours character
- Portrayed by: Menik Gooneratne
- Duration: 2011–2013
- First appearance: 1 September 2011
- Last appearance: 10 June 2013
- Introduced by: Susan Bower
In-universe information
- Occupation: Principal of Erinsborough High
- Husband: Ajay Kapoor (until 2013)
- Daughters: Rani Kapoor

Priya Kapoor is a fictional character from the Australian television soap opera Neighbours, played by Menik Gooneratne. The actress, who made a guest appearance in Neighbours in 2000, was given the role of Priya in July 2011. She made her first screen appearance during the episode broadcast on 1 September 2011. Three months later, it was announced Gooneratne had been promoted to the regular cast along with Sachin Joab and Coco Cherian, who play Priya's husband and daughter respectively. The Kapoor's arrival marked the show's first family with Indian and Sri Lankan heritage. They also became the first family to be introduced since 2010. Gooneratne's departure from Neighbours was announced on 12 March 2013 and she made her final screen appearance on 10 June.

Priya is a school principal, who is married to local lawyer, Ajay Kapoor (Joab). The couple married when they were young because they were expecting their daughter, Rani (Cherian). Both Priya and Ajay unintentionally put their careers before their marriage. Priya has been described as being both feisty and determined, while Gooneratne called her a high achiever and uptight. In late 2012, Priya began an affair with Paul Robinson (Stefan Dennis), a man who she initially struggled to get along with. Priya enjoyed the time she spent with Paul, because it made her feel alive again. Though she felt guilty, as she loved her husband. After Ajay found out about the affair, Priya tried to fix their relationship. However, it was not until she was harassed by a member of the school board, that she and Ajay were reunited. Priya died as a result of injuries sustained in an explosion, but she reappeared to Rani as a ghost.

== Casting ==
In July 2011, it was announced Gooneratne had joined the cast of Neighbours in the guest role of Priya Kapoor. The actress previously appeared in the show as Shanti Pandya in 2000. Gooneratne revealed that she did not have to audition for the role. She had tested for other characters months before and the producers saved her for Priya. Gooneratne made her debut screen appearance as Priya during the episode broadcast on 1 September 2011. Three months later, Daniel Kilkelly from Digital Spy reported that Gooneratne and Sachin Joab, who portrays Ajay Kapoor, would be promoted to regular cast members in early 2012. He also revealed that Coco Cherian had joined the cast as Priya and Ajay's on-screen daughter Rani.

The Kapoors became the first family to be introduced to Neighbours since the Williams' arrived in 2010. The show's then executive producer, Susan Bower, stated "I'm delighted by how the Kapoors have been introduced. Viewers already know them because of their role in the community and link with other characters, and their cultural background is secondary." Bower added that having a family of Indian and Sri Lankan heritage join the neighbourhood was very exciting. When asked by Kilkelly how she had settled in and whether she knew there would be a long-term plan for the Kapoors, Gooneratne said "The show just feels like home now, I love it. I understand the councillor role came first which Sachin [Jaob] was cast for, and then the rest of the family followed as the writers saw potential for these characters."

== Development ==
=== Characterisation ===
Priya has been described as being "pretty", "feisty" and "determined" by writers for All About Soap and Channel 5. While the Daily Star's Susan Hill called her "straight-laced" and Gooneratne deemed her "uptight, idealistic and strict." When asked if she was similar to her character, Gooneratne stated that she is not quite the high achiever Priya is. However, she is "pretty determined" like Priya when she puts her mind to it. The actress revealed that Priya was supposed to be four years older than herself, so she was aged with clothes and make-up. Gooneratne later commented that Priya was "a bit more glamorous" than she is. The actress thought Priya was quite wound up when she first appeared and everything seemed black and white to her. She also commented that Priya was craving more excitement in her life. Not long after her arrival on-screen, Priya became the principal of Erinsborough High, giving her an instant role within the community.

=== Marriage to Ajay Kapoor ===
Gooneratne revealed that Priya and Ajay "had" to get married when they were both young because she was expecting their daughter, Rani. The actress thought the producers were joking at first when they told her Priya would have a teenage daughter. Priya and Ajay became a family at the same time their friends were out having fun and they then had to establish careers. The actress commented "There hasn't been a lot of down time." During an interview for Channel 5's Neighbours website, both Gooneratne and Joab agreed that Priya was the boss in the relationship as she makes all the difficult decisions. The actors also stated that the couple had "unintentionally" put their careers before their marriage, leading to cracks appearing. Joab commented that because they are busy with life, Ajay and Priya forget about living in the moment. Gooneratne also stated "Priya is the one that keeps it together, and when Ajay makes decisions without her involvement, she doesn't like it." In July 2012, Ajay purchases Number 24 Ramsay Street without consulting Priya. Joab told an Inside Soap writer that Ajay and Priya had talked about settling down in Erinsborough for a while, but it was not "a wise move" for Ajay to buy a house without discussing it with his wife first. Gooneratne later revealed that Ajay and Priya had lost their way due to their lack of communication.

=== Affair with Paul Robinson ===
"Priya is really torn. She craves the time that she is with Paul, because it makes her feel like a woman and she can reconnect with that raw passion and fire. It makes her feel alive again. Then she comes home and knows all too well that she has done the wrong thing. She feels so awful for it, as she does love her husband."

— Gooneratne on Priya's affair with Paul

Shortly after her arrival, Priya takes an instants dislike to Paul Robinson (Stefan Dennis), in what a columnist for Inside Soap called "a case of hate at first sight". On why the pair have struggled to get along, Gooneratne revealed "They are both very strong-willed people, but I think Priya does take the high moral ground which is not exactly Paul's style, so most of the time they are at odds with each other." A friendship between the pair is formed when Paul supports Priya during a school board meeting about the budget. Priya is forced to make some tough decisions about whether to cut the VET classes in favour of the academic curriculum, to save money. Sonya Mitchell (Eve Morey) is upset by Priya's choice, but Paul, who has often been against Priya's plans for the school, lends her his full support.

Priya's proposal loses the vote, but she joins Paul at Charlie's to discuss alternative plans for the budget and enjoys herself. Gooneratne said "For just a moment, they're allies. They chat about school and parenting woes, so they're on common ground for a change. It's a nice surprise for Priya, and she sees Paul in a different light." When Paul purchases an expensive bottle of wine for them, Priya becomes uncomfortable and leaves. She chooses not to tell Ajay about her afternoon with Paul, as she is "still sorting out in her own mind what all this means." The following day, Paul sends Priya some champagne and Gooneratne stated that Priya feels he has crossed a line, although she likes the attention. When asked by Digital Spy's Daniel Kilkelly if her character would have a guilt-free affair, Gooneratne thought Priya would struggle because it would go against her moral beliefs.

A few weeks later, Priya comes "perilously close" to giving into her attraction to Paul. The situation occurs after Priya engages in an angry exchange with Susan Kennedy (Jackie Woodburne) about a newspaper article featuring Erinsborough High. Paul jumps to Priya's defence, which surprises her and she tells him off for intervening. Priya states that she can fight her own battles and Paul agrees, revealing that he likes that aspect of her personality. Priya then asks Paul to stay away from her. Gooneratne told TV Week's Jackie Brygel that all Priya wanted was for Ajay to support her, but instead she got that from a man who she thinks hates her. Priya later organises a special dinner for her and Ajay, but he is forced to cancel due to work commitments. Paul then turns up on her doorstep and she almost kisses him. Gooneratne said that the moment comes out of the blue and Priya feels awful about it afterwards, especially as she considers herself to be a very loyal person. She hates herself for being tempted, but she was in "a vulnerable situation where she's feeling fragile".

Priya continues to resist Paul's advances, but she feels he is punishing her when he misses a school board meeting. When Priya confronts Paul about his behaviour, he states that she is not being honest with herself and wants him as much as he wants her. Priya then kisses Paul "passionately" and they have sex, which leaves her feeling guilty about cheating on Ajay. Gooneratne explained "Priya is really torn. She craves the time that she is with Paul, because it makes her feel like a woman and she can reconnect with that raw passion and fire. It makes her feel alive again. Then she comes home and knows all too well that she has done the wrong thing. She feels so awful for it, as she does love her husband." The actress revealed that Priya is unable to get Paul out of her mind and does decide to continue with the affair. Gooneratne commented that the further along the storyline progressed, the more fun she had had with it. Dennis added that Priya and Paul's affair was "a time bomb" waiting to go off and believed it would shake up both households.

Priya decides to end her affair with Paul and the pair meet up behind Lassiter's Hotel to say goodbye. Priya gives Paul "a spur-of-the-moment" kiss, before they go their separate ways, but they are unaware that Rani has witnessed their embrace. Gooneratne believed that the possibility of being caught out had never occurred to Priya and she thought it was careless of her character. Rani later confront her mother about what she saw and Priya tells her that she was just comforting Paul because he was upset. Cherian commented that Rani really wants to believe the story, but when Priya starts buying her gifts, she realises something is not quite right. Rani finds proof of her mother's affair with Paul and exposes it to Ajay, who initially thinks she is lying to hurt Priya. However, Priya then confirms what Rani has said, which leaves Ajay devastated." He asks Priya to leave their home, but asks her back for Rani's sake. Joab commented that Ajay does not hate his wife and thought that there might be a chance that they could get through the situation.

After Priya informs Paul that she does not want to have anything more to do with him, Paul tries to make her life difficult at Erinsborough High. During a meeting of the school board, Paul decides to bring Priya's role "into question" and states that the school deserves better.

=== Harassment ===
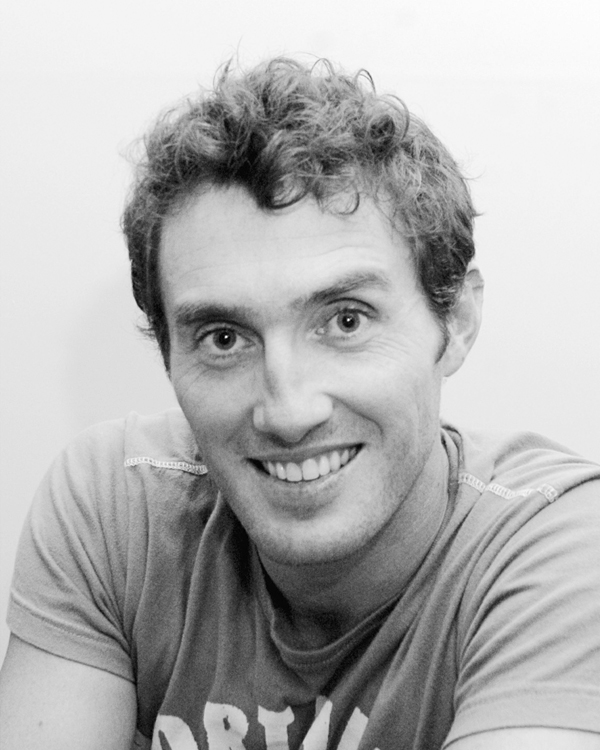
Priya is harassed by Brian O'Loughlin, played by Paul Denny (pictured).

In February 2013, Priya began receiving anonymous "lewd" text messages. Priya believes the sender behind the texts is a student at the school called Alistair O'Loughlin (Rahart Sadiqzai), especially as he has taunted her in the past. However, Priya soon learns that the texts have been sent by Alistair's father, Brian (Paul Denny), a member of the school board. Gooneratne commented "Brian thinks he has Priya backed into a corner and can use the information to his advantage." Brian's "cowardly act" pushes Priya to the edge and she later breaks down and confesses everything about the texts to Ajay. Gooneratne told TV Week's Thomas Mitchell that the fact Brian is the sender of the texts, is what prompts Priya to tell Ajay. She realised how dangerous and serious the situation is. Ajay realises that Priya was in danger without him knowing and it helps him to accept that they need to "mend their rift". Ajay sees that Priya is "a broken woman" and he agrees to attend counselling sessions with her, something that she had been pushing him to do. Gooneratne said that if the couple want to fix their relationship, they are moving in the right direction.

After Priya reports Brian to the police, she assumes the matter is over. However, she is "stunned" to learn that Brian has told the school board that she was the one harassing him. Priya is then suspended from her job. Gooneratne told an Inside Soap journalist "After the story about Priya's affair with Paul gets out, Brian uses it as a way to manipulate her. But she doesn't bow to his demands, so she makes up all sorts of claims – leading to this debacle." Things get worse for Priya when she discovers her friend, Susan Kennedy (Jackie Woodburne), has been offered her job. Gooneratne called it "a kick in the teeth for Priya", but thought that her character would want Susan to have her job, rather than someone else. Brian later offers to drop the allegations, but only if Priya spends the night with him. Gooneratne thought Brian was "a real creep" and explained that he thinks that because Priya had an affair with Paul, then she would be up for something similar with him. The actress added that Brian's suggestion makes Priya's skin crawl.

=== Departure and death ===
On 12 March 2013, Daniel Kilkelly from Digital Spy confirmed that Gooneratne had left Neighbours. Kilkelly said that Gooneratne was thought to have already filmed her exit scenes. He also reported that Joab had decided to leave his role as Ajay too. Priya's last storyline began on 19 March. While attending Sonya Mitchell (Eve Morey) and Toadfish Rebecchi's (Ryan Moloney) wedding reception, Priya becomes trapped inside a collapsed marquee, following a gas explosion. Priya was sending Rani an apologetic text at the time, after they had a "trivial" fight over what Priya wanted Rani to wear. Of her character's injuries, Gooneratne explained "She's been crushed by a heavy pot plant and it has fallen on her abdomen. She's unconscious, with internal bleeding and barely breathing." Priya's condition deteriorates and Ajay and Rani are left keeping "a bedside vigil" beside her. Priya dies from her injuries, but a week later she appears to her daughter as a ghost. Rani is struggling with Priya's death when she sees her sitting on the couch.

When asked by a TV Week reporter what was behind the apparition, Cherian said "Rani is feeling guilty, as the last time they spoke, she told Priya she hated her. She didn't get the chance to tell her how much she loves her, and she almost feels that her mum didn't love her back. The ghost is a way for Rani to attempt to find some closure on the whole situation." Rani is calm upon seeing the ghost of her mother and even talks to her. Priya later reappears in the kitchen and Gooneratne commented that her ghost is "very unresponsive". Rani opens up to Ajay about her feelings, but does not tell him about Priya's ghost. She later sees Priya again, making it obvious that she still feels guilty about her death. The TV Week reporter explained that Gooneratne returned to the Neighbours set to film the episodes after her "shock exit" from the show.

== Storylines ==
While Priya and her husband, Ajay, are celebrating their wedding anniversary at Lassiter's Hotel, they are interrupted by Toadfish Rebecchi (Ryan Moloney) who asks if Ajay can sign some legal papers. Priya is annoyed at the interruption and leaves Ajay and Toadie alone. Priya becomes the acting principal of Erinsborough High when Michael Williams (Sandy Winton) falls ill. While she is doing some paperwork in Charlie's, Paul Robinson introduces himself and flirts with her. He later insults Ajay at the opening of the History Wall and Priya reveals that he is her husband. Noah Parkin (Orpheus Pledger) tells Priya that his teacher, Kate Ramsay (Ashleigh Brewer), kissed him. Priya investigates Noah's allegations and informs Kate that she will have to contact the VIT and recommend she no longer be allowed to teach. When Noah tells Priya that Kate was grieving for her dead ex-boyfriend when the kiss occurred, she decides to handle the matter internally. However, Kate quits teaching. Priya bonds with Susan Kennedy when they both realise they are looking a new house. Priya successfully applies for the full-time position of principal and quickly begins making changes to the various policies. Her daughter Rani also joins the school. When she becomes short staffed, she denies Lucas Fitzgerald's (Scott Major) leave and tries to convince Kate to return.

Priya allows Andrew Robinson (Jordan Patrick Smith) to film a music video in the school. When she comes to check on the progress, Priya finds Sophie Ramsay (Kaiya Jones) has trashed a bathroom. Sophie refuses to apologise for her actions and Priya expels her. Paul tries to bribe Priya and Sophie writes an apology letter, but she refuses to change her mind until Kate asks her to. Zoe Alexander (Simmone Jade Mackinnon) gets Paul to fulfil a promise of a donation to the high school and Priya collects the cheque. However, when she insults Paul, he takes the cheque and rips it up. Priya is angered when Ajay purchases a house in Ramsay Street without consulting her, but she accepts that they cannot continue living in rented accommodation. Priya asks Rani to wear her glasses when looking at screens, but Rani admits that the glasses are embarrassing. Priya wishes Ajay would support her and he tells her that he will talk to Rani. During a school board meeting, Priya is surprised when Paul supports her decision to cut the VET classes. After losing a vote, Priya and Paul go to Charlie's and share a drink together. Priya decides not to tell Ajay about her afternoon with Paul. When Priya tries to encourage Kate to return to teaching, Paul sends her a bottle of champagne to say thank you. Paul supports Priya when she takes offence at an article written in his paper. During a discussion of Sophie's schoolwork, Paul and Priya come close to kissing.

When Priya catches Rani kissing Harley Canning (Justin Holborow), she calls her daughter cheap and asks Harley to stay away from her. Paul invites Priya to spend the night with him at Lassiter's, but she resists his advances. However, when he misses a school board meeting, she confronts him at his house and they end up having sex. When she returns with Rani, Priya realises she left her jacket behind and panics. Paul tells her to relax and states that it gets easier, before reminding her that she has a key to a hotel room. After telling Ajay that she needs to collect some paperwork, Priya goes to Lassiter's to be with Paul. Priya suspects that Paul is using her in his game against Ajay and calls off the affair. However, when he comes to see her at the school, Priya changes her mind and they have sex in her office. Kate informs Priya that Rani's attitude at school has changed since she has been dating Harley and Priya agrees to talk to her. Priya tells Ajay she has a meeting and goes to the school to be with Paul, but they are interrupted by Kate. Priya and Paul go to Lassiter's and after having sex, Priya falls asleep. Priya panics when she spots Ajay at the hotel looking for her and she calls him to say that she is okay. She later tells him that she was talking to Susan Kennedy. Paul becomes annoyed when Priya tries to set rules for their affair and she drops the idea.

Priya tells Ajay that she helping Susan with her issues, while she lies to Susan that she is taking pole dancing classes in secret. Ajay reveals to Priya that he has asked Susan to stop taking up all of her free time, which angers her. She later confesses to Susan that she is actually having an affair and Susan urges her to end it. After spending the day celebrating diwali with her family, Priya tells Paul that their affair is over. Paul asks Priya to reconsider, then threatens to tell everyone about the affair. He later accepts that it is over and he and Priya share a kiss and a hug. Rani tells Priya that she saw her hugging Paul and Priya explains that she was just comforting him over his son's epilepsy diagnosis. Priya learns that Rani is going to a party in Frankston with Harley and she and Ajay try to find her. When she gets home, Ajay tells Priya that Rani has accused her of having an affair with Paul. Priya later admits that it is true and Ajay throws her out. Priya spends the night in her office, before going home to talk to Ajay. Susan later offers Priya a place to stay and she vows to win Ajay back. Ajay later asks Priya to move back home for Rani's sake. Priya decides to attend counselling and asks Ajay to come with her, but he refuses. Priya is later sent obscene text messages and she believes the sender is Alistair O'Loughlin, as he set up a Facebook page about her family. However, she soon learns that the culprit is Alistair's father, Brian.

Paul informs Priya that Brian has accused her of harassing him. Priya is suspended by the school board, while they investigate. Ajay tells Priya he loves her and that they will get through the situation together. Priya later learns that she has been sacked by the school board and Susan has been offered her job. Priya begs Brian to drop the accusations against her and he asks her to spend the night with him in return. Priya tells Susan about Brian's proposition. Susan meets with Brian and blackmails him into dropping the accusations against Priya, after learning that he has harassed other women before. Priya is then reinstated as principal of Erinsborough High. While Priya's relationship with Ajay improves, Rani is still reluctant to forgive her, especially when Priya buys her a dress she does not like for Sonya (Eve Morey) and Toadie's wedding. During the reception, a gas bottle explodes destroying the marquee. Priya is trapped inside, having been crushed by falling debris. She is taken to the hospital in a serious condition and rushed into surgery. Karl later tells Ajay and Rani that Priya has suffered cerebral hypoxia and will not wake up. They say their goodbyes, before Priya's life support is switched off. Priya's ghost later appears to Rani, who is struggling to get closure. A few weeks after Rani lays Priya's ghost to rest, she sees her again applauding her school play.

== Reception ==
Following the announcement that the Kapoor family would become regular cast members, several racist posts left on the Neighbours website had to be removed by staff. Executive producer, Susan Bower, said most of the inappropriate comments, from viewers expressing their anger at a non-Anglo-Saxon family being introduced to the show, came from a "small minority". She later commented that for every negative comment about the family there were ten to fifteen positive ones. Joab spoke out about the issue, blaming the racism on a "lack of education". He stated "There is various pockets that will say it is un-Australian to have an Indian or an Indian family on Ramsay St. Those Aussies who are saying it is un-Australian will be the same ones who pretty much supported the White Australia policy back in the day, you are never going to get away from that kind of stuff." Joab added having a show, which portrays different families coming together could only be a good thing for the community.

TV Week's Jackie Brygel called Priya the "perfect wife and mum", while a writer for What's on TV branded her and Ajay a "power couple". Dianne Butler, writing for news.com.au, stated "Paul Robinson. The old fox. What's he up to with Priya? And vice-versa obviously. I don't blame her, her husband's a clown. I cannot wait to see where this ends up." Tony Stewart from the Daily Mirror commented "There's a waferthin line between love and hate for Paul and Priya. When he supports her at a school board meeting, the two bond over a bottle of bubbly. So why does Priya keep this secret from her husband, and why does Paul send her a gift on Thursday? Watch this space..." Digital Spy's Daniel Kilkelly questioned whether Priya would be able to make up with Rani after humiliating her in front of Harley and added "Priya knows that her anger is really directed at herself over the Paul situation."

The Sydney Morning Herald's Melinda Houston praised the introduction of a non-Anglo family to Ramsay Street and thought Priya getting angry with Paul was "because she secretly fancies him, an extremely unlikely event from which all kinds of drama is bound to flow. I know he's the richest and most powerful man in Erinsborough. I just thought Priya was better than that. Let's hope she comes to her senses." On 13 November 2012, Butler commented "Priya looks like a three-day-old filly as she makes her sorry way up her front steps tonight. Like she didn't know sleeping with Paul Robinson was going to end in a world of hurt."
