= List of Neighbours characters introduced in 2011 =

Neighbours is an Australian television soap opera that was first broadcast on 18 March 1985. The following is a list of characters that first appeared in 2011, by order of first appearance. All characters were introduced by the shows executive producer Susan Bower. The 27th season of Neighbours began airing on 11 January 2011. That same month saw Jack Finsterer join the cast as Garland Cole. Dieter Brummer made his first appearance as Troy Miller in May and Carolyn Johnstone, a new love interest for Harold Bishop, followed shortly after. Ivan DeMarco and Superintendent Duncan Hayes began appearing in June. Ajay Kapoor, Rhys Lawson, Michelle Tran and Noah Parkin arrived in July. Bobby Morley made his debut as Aidan Foster the following month. Martin Chambers, Priya Kapoor, Lorraine Dowski and Emilia Jovanovic began appearing from September. Kyle Canning's cousin, Dane, made his first appearance in October. Jessica Girdwood, Erin Salisbury and Elaine Lawson arrived in November.

== Garland Cole ==
Garland Cole
- Neighbours character
- Portrayed by: Jack Finsterer
- First appearance: 28 January 2011
- Last appearance: 3 March 2011
- Introduced by: Susan Bower

Garland Cole, played by Jack Finsterer, made his first on-screen appearance on 28 January 2011. Garland is an ex-con who is also involved in illegal street racing. Garland is Finsterer's second role with Neighbours. He previously appeared as Russell Sykes in 1992. Finsterer began filming his role in October 2010. A reporter for the Western Mail branded Garland a villain and said he "reared his ugly head" when he reappeared.

When Lucas Fitzgerald (Scott Major) needs some money to buy a new motorbike, Billy Forman (Jez Constable) gives him Garland's contact details. Garland brings a car to the garage for Lucas to illegally rebirth. He comes to pick up the parts and leaves Lucas with the shell. Garland later meets Lucas and Billy at Charlie's and he tells Lucas that he recognised his name and asks him whether he raced for Reyada. Lucas tells him that he did and that he has a new bike, Garland then asks if he wants to get involved in some street racing. Lucas initially turns him down, but he later turns up at the race and wins it, earning Garland and Billy a lot of money. At the next race, Garland tells Lucas to lose, throwing the race. However, Lucas wins the race, which makes Garland angry as he lost money. Garland later turns up at the garage and gets one of his associates to beat Lucas up. Garland arranges Lucas' house to be trashed and Billy later tells Lucas that Garland is giving him a second chance. Lucas goes to the venue of the race and deliberately loses for Garland, who gets his money back.

Lucas decides to race again and Garland tells him that he was not sure he would be back and that there is one more race left for the day. He introduces Lucas to a new racer called Rob, but Lucas realises that it is Mark Brennan (Scott McGregor) undercover. After the race, which Lucas wins, Garland tells Mark to go and collect his winnings and that he can shout him and Lucas breakfast. However, Lucas tells him that he some work to do at the garage and Garland questions whether they are good with each other. Lucas later calls Garland to Charlie's and just before he can get him to talk, Garland sees Kate Ramsay (Ashleigh Brewer) and tries to flirt with her. Lucas tells him that he wants back in on the car stripping and Garland tells him that he will be in touch. Garland delivers a new car to Lucas and tells him Mark, as Rob, will be helping him. When Garland comes to pick up the car, he discovers Kate hiding in the garage and demands to know what is going on. Mark tells him that he met Kate at Charlie's and that she came to meet him at the garage early. Once the parts are loaded, Garland tells Mark that they should take Kate for a drive as he is suspicious about how she turned up and Billy pulled out. The police arrive and Mark arrests Garland and takes him to the station. Mark later tells Kate that Garland was given an eighteen-month prison sentence.

== Troy Miller ==
Troy Miller, played by Dieter Brummer, made his first screen appearance on 10 May 2011. Brummer had a seven-week contract with the show and he relocated to Melbourne for filming. Troy is Sonya Mitchell's (Eve Morey) ex-boyfriend and the biological father of Callum Jones (Morgan Baker). Brummer told a TV Week writer that Troy is "involved in Sonya's dark past" and that he comes to Erinsborough to work out something with her. When Troy arrives in Ramsay Street, Brummer explained he is not intentionally trying to stir up trouble, but there are aspects of his personality that would cause problems. The actor added his character would cause waves between Sonya and her partner, Toadfish Rebecchi (Ryan Moloney). Troy flees Erinsborough after terrorising Callum, Sonya and Toadie. On 2 March 2012, it was announced that Brummer would be reprising his role of Troy for a six-week guest stint.

== Carolyn Johnstone ==
Carolyn Johnstone
- Neighbours character
- Portrayed by: Paula Duncan
- First appearance: 25 May 2011
- Last appearance: 15 June 2011
- Introduced by: Susan Bower
In-universe information
- Occupation: Earthly Essence Teas owner
- Husband: Harold Bishop (2011–2015)

Carolyn Johnstone, played by Paula Duncan, made her first on-screen appearance on 25 May 2011. Carolyn was introduced as Harold Bishop's fiancée. On 30 March 2011, the Herald Sun reported Duncan had joined the cast of Neighbours in a guest role as Harold Bishop's (Ian Smith) love interest. Duncan began filming her first scenes as Carolyn in late March at the Nunawading studio. Duncan previously appeared in Neighbours as Amy Medway in 1985.

Of Harold and Carolyn's relationship, Duncan said "Harold is very Salvation Army, so there is no alcohol or sex." The official Neighbours website said "Harold's back and his bought with him a brand new love he picked up on his travels around Australia, to join him on his favourite Street. So, where will Harold and his new love live? In his Winnebago perhaps?" Executive producer Susan Bower said she was delighted that Harold is sharing his journey with the "beautiful and extremely talented" Duncan. She added that not everyone will welcome Harold and Carolyn when they arrive in Ramsay Street. Duncan told TV Week that she was "nervous" about joining the cast as the "vivacious" Carolyn. Duncan described her character as a "highly ambitious, dramatic, over-the-top person", who has found love with a simple and graceful man, which is what she has been searching for all her life. In May 2011, Smith revealed to Inside Soap that he suggested Harold should get married during his return to Erinsborough and so the writers made Carolyn his fiancée. Harold's relationship with Carolyn is not well received by his best friend, Lou (Tom Oliver).

Harold reveals to Toadfish Rebecchi (Ryan Moloney) that Carolyn used to be a corporate lawyer, but she now runs her own company, Earthly Essence Teas. Harold met Carolyn after he enquired about the tea in a cafe one day and was directed to her. Carolyn makes a surprise visit to Erinsborough to see Harold. She meets Toadfish Rebecchi (Ryan Moloney) and gives some tea to Lyn Scully (Janet Andrewartha). Harold and Carolyn talk to Troy Miller (Dieter Brummer) and Carolyn asks him how much it will take to get him to leave town. Toadie is not happy with what happened and tells Harold to stay out of his business. Carolyn tells Toadie that he takes Harold for granted and they argue. After realising how much Erinsborough means to Harold, Carolyn suggests that they get married while they are in town. Carolyn meets Harold's friend, Lou, and she is not impressed. Carolyn vetoes Lou's idea of a buck's night and they argue. Harold gets them to compromise on a joint party at Charlie's. On the day of the wedding, Lou and Toadie tell Carolyn that Harold has gone missing. Carolyn is not fazed and tells them Harold will be at the ceremony. Harold arrives late and he and Carolyn are married. Harold and Carolyn return from their honeymoon and try to tell Lou that he has taken on too much at the car yard, but Lou does not listen to them and he later collapses. Carolyn accompanies Harold to the hospital, where they are told Lou will be fine. Harold and Carolyn begin packing the van, ready to leave when Callum asks them to get Sonya to move back in with him and Toadie. Carolyn calls on Lucas Fitzgerald (Scott Major) for reinforcements, but their plan fails and Harold and Carolyn are sorry they could not convince Sonya and Toadie to move in together. However, Carolyn thinks that Toadie and Sonya just need something to prompt them into action. After saying goodbye to Lou, Harold and Carolyn are delighted when Toadie and Sonya reveal they are moving back in together. They say their goodbyes and Harold and Carolyn leave. When Harold returns in 2015, he reveals that he and Caroline have since split.

Of Carolyn, the Sunday Mercury's Roz Laws said "It takes a lot to fill Madge's shoes but Harold's new fiancee Carolyn makes an impact on Ramsay Street." A Sunday Mail reporter stated "Harold has never found anybody special enough to take the place of Madge in his heart - until now. His new fiancee, Carolyn, arrives in town this week, and makes an instant impact; she's a feisty lady who shakes a few feathers."

== Ivan DeMarco ==
Ivan DeMarco
- Neighbours character
- Portrayed by: Ben Knight
- First appearance: 2 June 2011
- Last appearance: 29 June 2011
- Introduced by: Susan Bower
In-universe information
- Occupation: Gardener

Ivan DeMarco, played by Ben Knight, made his first on-screen appearance on 2 June 2011. Ivan was introduced as a love interest for Natasha Williams and was described as being a "bad boy." In June 2011, Inside Soap reported that school student Natasha Williams (Valentina Novakovic) was to meet and "hook up" with Ivan, a guy ten years older than her. A source told the magazine that Ivan "isn't necessarily good for her." In an attempt to impress Ivan, Natasha sends him "raunchy photos" of herself. However, Ivan betrays Natasha by showing the pictures to his friends and her classmates find out causing a scandal at her school. Ivan was branded a "cad" by TV Week, whilst Susan Hill writing for the Daily Star called him a "hunky bad boy."

Ivan meets Natasha Williams on a night out. He asks to meet her again the next day and they go to the university bar. Natasha confesses that she is seventeen, but this does not worry Ivan, who tells her that he wants someone fun and up for a good time. Ivan later gives Natasha a fake ID. Natasha tries to get Ivan to meet her father, Michael (Sandy Winton), but Ivan refuses. Natasha takes him to Charlie's for lunch and arranges for Michael to meet them there. Ivan is not interested in talking to Michael, but Natasha begs him to stay. Michael asks Ivan what he wants from Natasha, but Ivan leaves. Ivan meets up with Natasha and she asks him to continue their relationship in secret. Ivan buys Natasha a necklace and takes her out to breakfast, before asking her why they have to keep sneaking around. Natasha explains that it is better that way. Natasha and Chris Pappas (James Mason) run into Ivan at the university, where he is working, and Natasha tells him to stay away from her. Whilst she is alone, Natasha goes over to Ivan and he tells her that he did not like being shot down and things are starting to feel a little like high school. Natasha explains that she needs more time for people to get used to the idea of them being together. They make up and Ivan asks Natasha to send him naked pictures of herself to him, which she does.

Natasha confronts Ivan when she learns that his friends have seen the pictures. Ivan convinces Natasha that it was unintended and that it will not happen again. He later goes to Charlie's to see her and offers to take her out. Natasha discovers that her pictures are on the internet. She confronts Ivan about who he sent them to and she smashes his phone. Ivan and his friends go to Charlie's and start talking about Natasha's photos. Michael sees them and he takes Ivan's phone and puts it in a glass of beer. Ivan comes to Ramsay Street to talk to Natasha and Michael punches him. Ivan comes to Natasha school and tells her that they need to talk. Ivan wants to know if Michael is still going to the police and Natasha tells him that he is. Natasha also tells him that it is her word against his about who took the photos. Ivan gets angry and Michael finds them. He asks Ivan to leave, but Ivan stays and tells Michael that Natasha took the photos. Ivan then reveals that he will go to the police if Michael does. Just as Michael is leaving the police station, Ivan appears and tells him that he is going to make an assault complaint. Michael shoves Ivan up against a wall and Ivan encourages him, reminding him there are plenty of witnesses around. Michael lets him go and tells him to get lost. Ivan then walks away.

== Duncan Hayes ==
Duncan Hayes
- Neighbours character
- Portrayed by: Paul Ireland
- Duration: 2011–2013, 2024–2025
- First appearance: 15 June 2011
- Last appearance: 13 January 2025
- Introduced by: Susan Bower
In-universe information
- Occupation: Police superintendent

Duncan Hayes, played by Paul Ireland, made his first appearance on 15 June 2011. Hayes is a senior police officer and Mark Brennan's boss. Ireland's casting was announced in April 2011. The Scottish-born actor was signed up for an initial thirteen episodes and he hoped viewers would like his character and producers would keep him on. Of his casting, the actor said "I'm thrilled to be joining Neighbours. It's a great show and a terrific opportunity."

After uncovering a corruption ring in the police force, Detective Mark Brennan (Scott McGregor) comes to Hayes when his house is trashed. Hayes tells Mark that it was probably kids, until Mark admits that he is being targeted before. His car was vandalised and he has been receiving threatening texts and silent calls. Hayes tells him that he will look into it and advises him to tread carefully until the investigation is resolved. Hayes meets Mark at Charlie's bar and informs him that he received a threatening text. Hayes then tells Mark that he will have to go into witness protection, but Mark is unsure. Hayes realises that Mark has a partner, but Mark assures him that it is not serious. Hayes tries to convince Mark that witness protection is the only way to keep him safe and Mark agrees to go. A few days later, Hayes tells Mark that things have moved faster than expected and his new place and identity are ready. He then gives Mark an hour and a half to get things together. Mark returns to the station and tells Hayes that things have changed and he wants to bring his girlfriend, Kate Ramsay (Ashleigh Brewer), with him. Hayes explains that the plan cannot be changed, but Mark tells him that it will have to, or he will not go. Hayes meets Mark at a car park and tries to hurry him along, but Mark waits for Kate. Eventually they have to leave without Kate, but Hayes allows Mark to text her from his phone. Hayes later visits Kate to tell her about the importance of keeping quiet and he warns her to stay away from the station. When Kate contacts Mark's mother, Hayes returns to explain to Kate that her actions could have put Mark's safety at risk and jeopardised the whole operation. Kate asks Hayes if he can give Mark a message from her, but Hayes refuses.

Hayes invites Toadfish Rebecchi (Ryan Moloney) to the station, so he can sign some statements. An officer interrupts the meeting and tells Hayes that there has been a fatality, and they leave the room. Toadie opens the door and hears Mark's name being mentioned. Hayes tells Toadie to keep what he heard a secret and that no one can know. Hayes comes to Charlie's and bumps into Toadie. Hayes tells him that he must work through the situation alone and that he will not have it compromised by him or anyone else. A few months later, Hayes runs into Callum Jones (Morgan Baker), who confronts him about keeping his officers safe and doing nothing when they are killed. Toadie visits Hayes and tells him his partner and son, Callum, know about Mark's death. Toadie asks Hayes if they can tell Kate about Mark and he agrees. Hayes then tells Kate about Mark's death. Hayes begins investigating the attack on Chris Pappas (James Mason) and questions Toadie about his involvement. Paul gives Toadie an alibi and Hayes brings in Peter Noonan (James Saunders) for questioning. Hayes searches Toadie's house and car, finding the wrench Chris was attacked with. He questions Kyle Canning (Chris Milligan) and later arrests Lewis Walton (Andy McPhee) for the attack. Hayes questions Lucas Fitzgerald (Scott Major) when Michael Williams' (Sandy Winton) panel van is torched. Michael later tells Hayes that it was his fault the van caught fire. In May 2013, Hayes returns to Erinsborough when Sergeant Matt Turner (Josef Brown) and his son Bailey (Calen MacKenzie) confess their involvement in a robbery in Mount Isa. Hayes demotes Matt to Senior Constable and gives Bailey a warning.

More than a decade later, Hayes is working in the city and is approached by Yasmine Shields (Chrishell Stause) with new evidence surrounding her brother Heath Royce's (Ethan Panizza) death that implicates Holly Hoyland (Lucinda Armstrong Hall). Hayes examines the video of Heath but later informs Yaz that it is not sufficient to reopen the case, considering the number of witness statements corroborating Holly's version of events. Yasmine visits Hayes again with audio footage of Holly wishing Heath dead. Hayes informs Yasmine that she obtained the recording illegally and it is not enough to charge Holly with a crime. He informs Yasmine that if she carries on he will arrest her instead.

== Ajay Kapoor ==
Ajay Kapoor, played by Sachin Joab, made his first screen appearance on 13 July 2011. In December, it was announced that Ajay and his wife, Priya (Menik Gooneratne), would be promoted to the regular cast in 2012, along with their daughter, Rani (Coco Cherian). Ajay was raised and educated in Erinsborough. He had a successful career in finance, before becoming an "ambitious local councilor." He is "a pretty positive guy", who does everything for his family. Ajay and Priya "had" to get married when they were both young, as they were expecting their daughter. When Ajay makes decisions without Priya's involvement, she does not like it. Joab commented that Ajay often has "a knack" of turning things around with her though. Shortly after his arrival, Ajay developed a rivalry with Paul Robinson (Stefan Dennis).

== Rhys Lawson ==
Rhys Lawson, played by Ben Barber, made his first on screen appearance on 13 July 2011. The character and casting was announced on 18 May 2011. Barber began filming the week before his casting announcement. Rhys is a doctor who works at Erinsborough Hospital. Of Rhys, Barber said "I love the character, he is very determined and focused which gets him into trouble." Barber told a writer for Inside Soap that his character is very driven and sees Erinsborough as being "a bit of a backwater." He would like to be a surgeon one day and is not afraid to step on his colleagues toes, including Karl Kennedy's (Alan Fletcher).

== Michelle Tran ==
Michelle Tran
- Neighbours character
- Portrayed by: HaiHa Le
- First appearance: 15 July 2011
- Last appearance: 29 August 2011
- Introduced by: Susan Bower
In-universe information
- Occupation: Florist

Michelle Tran, played by HaiHa Le, made her first on-screen appearance on 15 July 2011. The character and casting was announced on 1 June 2011. Le had a two-month guest role with the show and she said joining Neighbours was a "real gift." When asked if she would like to see Michelle move into Ramsay Street full-time, Le told Holy Soap "That is entirely up to the writers and producers but I think Michelle would be a great addition to Ramsay Street. She's a bit of trouble and there is certainly a point-of-difference with this character. It would be wonderful to continue."

Michelle is one of Jade Mitchell's (Gemma Pranita) clients and she happens to be looking for somewhere to live. She moves in with Jade and Kyle Canning (Chris Milligan) at Number 26 and quickly becomes known as the "housemate from hell." Le said that Michelle seems fine at first, but cracks in her persona begin appearing and she "turns things upside down for her flatmates." The show's official website said Michelle will "upset Jade's equilibrium" as she is just a "little bit annoying." Le explained that Michelle means well, but she rubs people up the wrong way without realising and she jumps into situations without thinking about the consequences. Le told the official website "To describe her as annoying is an understatement, and she is certainly one of a kind. However, despite the madness, she has a heart of gold." Asked whether Michelle is similar to other characters she has played before, Le said she is, but unlike them, Michelle has a dark edge, which the actress found fun to play. Le added that the writers have done "an amazing job" with Michelle and the costume department have made Michelle very colourful. Michelle becomes "infatuated" with Lucas Fitzgerald (Scott Major), who is friends with Jade and Kyle. Her crush gets out of hand and Le said Michelle "knows what she wants she doesn't let go and doesn't take no for answer." The actress added that Michelle has selective hearing and she blocks out what she does not want to hear.

During a session with her personal trainer, Jade Mitchell, Michelle reveals that she has to move out of her home because her roommate is going overseas and she cannot find anyone to move in that she gets along with. She does not like living by herself as she is a people person. Jade reveals that she and her housemate, Kyle, have a spare room and Michelle agrees to move in. Michelle brings some of her belongings over to the house. She sees the table set for dinner and asks Jade if she is preparing for a date. Jade tells her that they have an official housemate dinner every month. Michelle later returns with a cake she made, interrupting Jade and Kyle. Michelle, Jade, Kyle and Kate Ramsay (Ashleigh Brewer) go to Charlie's for a night out and Michelle picks up on Kyle's crush on Kate. Jade introduces Michelle to Lucas Fitzgerald and he buys her a drink. Michelle listens to Kyle talk about Kate and her one-night stand. She later confronts Kate at Harold's Store and tells her that Kyle deserves better. Kyle is angry with Michelle and she apologises to him. Michelle rearranges the kitchen and later borrows Jade's dress for a date. Jade gets angry and explains that only things they share are the house and the bills, upsetting Michelle. When she returns home, Michelle reveals her date was with Lucas. Michelle and Lucas then begin dating.

Michelle discovers Lucas has a lot of money and he tells her his late father left it to him. Michelle tries to get him to open up about his father, but he is not very forthcoming with information. Michelle starts planning a holiday with Lucas, but he tells her they are not ready to go away together. Lucas breaks up with her and during a fit of rage, she throws an ornament on the floor. Michelle cannot believe her relationship is over and asks Jade to help her get Lucas back. Jade tries to tell Michelle to move on, but Michelle is devastated. She later calms down and Jade tells her she and Kyle want her to move out. Michelle tells them her name is on the lease and she is not going anywhere. Kyle and Jade offer Michelle her rent money back to leave, but she refuses to take it. Michelle sees Jade has brought a cat into the house and tells her she is allergic and that keeping pets is in breach of the lease. Michelle is suspicious when a property inspector suddenly comes to look at the house. When he finds damage to her room and reveals it will cost her thousands of dollars to repair, she decides to move out. Just before she leaves, Michelle reveals Jade and Kyle's friends with benefits arrangement to Lucas and Sonya.

== Noah Parkin ==
Noah Parkin
- Neighbours character
- Portrayed by: Orpheus Pledger
- First appearance: 27 July 2011
- Last appearance: 29 November 2011
- Introduced by: Susan Bower
In-universe information
- Occupation: Student

Noah Parkin, played by Orpheus Pledger, made his first on-screen appearance on 27 July 2011. The character and Pledger's casting was announced on 25 May 2011. The actor began filming his first scenes opposite Kaiya Jones, a week before the casting announcement. Pledger revealed his agent had told him about an upcoming role in Neighbours and asked him to read through Noah's character notes. Pledger told Digital Spy, "I thought he was a really cool character and someone I'd really like to play. I was then asked to come in for a test with the Neighbours casting director, then there was a recall and then I was given the role!" Pledger has a six-month contract with the show. Of Noah and Pledger's casting, executive producer, Susan Bower said "We are very excited about Noah, he is certainly different from our regular characters and Orpheus fits the role perfectly." Bower promised that viewers will love Noah's storyline.

Pledger revealed the Neighbours producers first described Noah as "a cool, guitar-playing dude", which the actor liked. Noah is a senior student at Erinsborough High and was described by the Neighbours official website as being a "free-spirited teen who will set some hearts on fire." Noah is the son of a minister and has good intentions. Pledger explained that he is a nice person with a good heart. Noah stays in his own bubble and does not try to interact with anyone as he can manage on his own. He is not shy, but does not seek popularity. Of Noah's quiet introduction to the show, Pledger explained "It's different from the introduction of other characters and I like it because it makes the audience want to learn more about him. Also, you think he is going in one direction because his appearances are so subtle, and then it shifts dramatically..." The official UK Neighbours website reported Noah would get close to one particular Erinsborough local and they should prepare for "heartbreak and havoc." Noah connects with Sophie Ramsay (Jones) as they are both into music and playing the guitar. Pledger said there is physical attraction and Sophie is just a friend, who Noah can help. However, Sophie develops a crush on Noah, which he does not notice. Instead Noah falls for her older sister, Kate (Ashleigh Brewer). Pledger told TV Week that Noah thinks Kate is beautiful and he tries to be around her because she is nice to him. The actor later expanded on this, saying Kate is "one of the few that were really nice to him from the start - she didn't judge him. He's a pretty deep thinker so he reads her natural friendliness as something more than what it is." Noah takes Kate's friendly gestures the wrong way and Pledger added Noah sees an opportunity to act on his feelings and the consequences are drastic.

Of Noah, Dianne Butler of the Herald Sun said "I love a stalker as much as the next girl, and the way he told those others he had a "present for his girlfriend" and, I don't know, that beanie ... pull it down and cut eye holes in it and suddenly Erinsborough's got a rapist/killer/kidnapper/pervert of whatever threat level." Butler also thought Noah may spend the next four years growing dreadlocks as he seems to have bought the hat to accommodate them. Butler's fellow critic Cameron Adams pointed out that the character was always going to be "bad news", saying "The signs were there. Musician. Nose-ring. Beanie. Nothing says 'bad boy' like a facial piercing." Adams added that Noah "developed a nasty habit stalking Kate. He's calling her his girlfriend. And turning up at the store she works at after hours. Indeed, he's doing some serious, unhinged stalking work."

Noah begins his first day of Erinsborough High and is introduced to his class by Michael Williams (Sandy Winton). During a Maths lesson, Natasha Williams (Valentina Novakovic) tries to get Noah's attention, but he just shows her a cartoon he has been drawing of their teacher. Natasha compliments it, but Noah does not say anything and throws it in the bin when the class ends. Sophie Ramsay (Kaiya Jones) finds Noah playing the guitar and she asks him about the piece he is playing. Noah tells her it does not have a name and that he wrote it. Noah finds Sophie practising the guitar and he gives her some tips on the chords. Noah offers to tune Sophie's guitar and he lets her play his one. He tells her he has been playing the guitar since he was seven and that his parents support him. Sophie's sister, Kate, introduces herself to Noah and thanks him for helping Sophie out. She later asks Noah if he will give Sophie some guitar lessons. During a practice session, Noah and Sophie manage to blow an outlet and the whole street loses power. Noah gives Sophie a journal, so she can write down some songs and he goes to Harold's Store. Kate praises Noah's sketches and he asks her to tutor him in history. Sophie organises a gig for Noah at the Men's Shed and Kate tells him that Sophie has a crush on him. Noah gets involved in the local History Wall project, which is being overseen by Kate.

Andrew Robinson (Jordan Patrick Smith) finds a song Noah wrote and accuses him of having a crush on Kate. Kate talks to Noah, but he insists he actually has a crush on Summer Hoyland (Jordy Lucas), which Kate believes. Noah allows Sophie to join his music collective when she starts learning the bass. Noah learns of Kate's ex-boyfriend, Mark (Scott McGregor), and he talks to her about past relationships. He later finds an upset Kate at the History Wall and he is delighted when she kisses him. Kate later tells Noah the kiss was a mistake. Noah sends Kate a drawing and Kate tells him to back off. Kate asks Noah to meet her and she confronts him about stealing her work apron from her room. Noah denies taking the apron. Noah spots Kate putting something in his guitar case and he tells Natasha and Chris the gift is from his girlfriend. Noah comes to Kate's house on the pretense on seeing Sophie. He invites Kate and Sophie to a gig in the city, but Kate sends Lou Carpenter (Tom Oliver) in her place. Noah, Sophie and the collective play a gig at Charlie's to save PirateNet. Noah tells Kate that he knows where he stands and she tells him they should start over. Kate helps Noah to retrieve his amp from the van and he tries to kiss her again, which angers Kate. Noah is surprised when Sophie cancels their music lessons and Kate tells him Sophie knows about his crush on her. Noah is hurt when Kate calls him a stalker and tells him there is no proof of their kiss happening. At the opening of the History Wall, Noah tells the acting principal, Priya Kapoor (Menik Gooneratne), that Kate kissed him. He later changes his mind and says he made the whole thing up. However, Priya launches an investigation after Sophie tells her the allegation is true. Noah tells Paul Robinson (Stefan Dennis) about Mark's death and gives him a letter to give to Kate. Noah then tells Priya that he pursued Kate and wanted the kiss to happen. He goes to the History Wall and adds Kate to the mural, before picking up his bag and walking away.

== Aidan Foster ==
Aidan Foster, played by Bobby Morley, made his first screen appearance on 19 August 2011. The character and Morley's casting was announced on 18 June 2011. The actor initially had a six-month contract with the show. Aidan was introduced as a love interest for Chris Pappas (James Mason) and the characters formed the show's first ever gay couple. Executive producer Susan Bower commented "The character that Bob is playing is older and further down the track with his relationship testing, so it will be a relationship story rather than a gay male romance." In November 2011, Anthony D. Langford of AfterElton said he liked Aidan from the scenes he had seen and thought Aidan seemed like "a funny, interesting guy". Langford went on to say he was looking forward to Aidan interacting with Chris, but thought he seemed a little too old for the teenager.

== Martin Chambers ==
Martin Chambers
- Neighbours character
- Portrayed by: John Wood
- Duration: 2011–2012
- First appearance: 1 September 2011
- Last appearance: 5 April 2012
- Introduced by: Susan Bower
In-universe information
- Occupation: Head of Surgery at Erinsborough Hospital

Martin Chambers, played by John Wood, made his first on-screen appearance on 1 September 2011. The character and casting was announced on 3 June 2011 and Wood began filming his first scenes later that month. When asked how he felt about joining Neighbours, Wood revealed that he had not been expecting it, but it had been a pleasant surprise. He told the Herald Sun, he accepted the small continuing role of Martin, as it sounded good and he had not been on commercial television for a long time or on Neighbours before. He explained, "A day a week, that is not going to kill me and it reminds everyone I am still alive." Executive producer Susan Bower said she was "thrilled" to welcome Wood to the cast and said his storyline would be "great."

Of Martin, Wood told TV Week: "He's the head of surgery at Erinsborough Hospital. He's very focused and ambitious and doesn't suffer fools – so he could be a good bloke or a villain, depending on what he thinks of you." The actor later told the official UK Neighbours website that Martin is intimidating, has strong opinions and is not easily swayed. Digital Spy reported that Martin is strict and has a reputation for taking his work very seriously. Wood revealed that he is not good with blood or other people's health problems, but hoped to be able to act around it. He also expected the medical jargon to include some "challenging pronunciations." Script producer, Emma Gordon, told The West Australian that viewers can expect a different side to Wood, saying "John was a bit worried when he came in and asked if he actually had to do any surgery but I told him most of his stories take place on the golf course or in the bar. We certainly keep that sense of larrikin about him, even though he is very senior, and all the things that people love about John he won't help but bring to the character." Martin will join Karl Kennedy (Alan Fletcher) and Rhys Lawson (Ben Barber), who is just settling in at the hospital. During an interview with TV Week, Wood said Martin has known Karl for a long time, but he has never been seen before. Wood said "Presumably he's been beavering away in the hospital and has finally come up for air." Wood said the three doctors initially get along, but that does not last long and the story starts to become interesting. Wood explained "Rhys has an agenda which involves my character. Karl Kennedy also gets involved, and he and Chambers don't see eye to eye on some issues mainly involving Rhys so plenty of conflict." Rhys tries to get into Martin's good books in order to become a surgeon and this makes Karl feel like he is being sidelined. Wood explained Martin's main reason for being in Neighbours is to be a catalyst between Karl and Rhys. The actor added "I suspect that Rhys is going to show Dr Chambers up by saving someone that Martin is losing on the operating table."

Martin arranges a round of golf with Adrian Pearce (Christopher Waters) and Karl Kennedy. Karl invites Rhys Lawson along and he introduces him to Martin. Martin is impressed with Rhys's golfing ability and Rhys reveals he is a fan. Martin tells Rhys they can talk about his early work sometime off course. Martin chats to Karl about his wife, Susan (Jackie Woodburne), and their upcoming holiday. Martin questions Rhys on where he is going in the hospital and Rhys reveals he wants to become a surgeon. Martin invites him to observe him. Martin organises another round of golf with Rhys. They meet Karl and his son, Malcolm (Benjamin McNair), and decide to play together. Martin, Adrian and some of their colleagues are invited to a barbecue at Rhys' home. Martin is impressed by Rhys and gives him an interview for the surgical team. Martin conducts the interviews alongside senior surgeon, Jessica Girdwood (Glenda Linscott). Martin is not impressed when Rhys turns up late and struggles to answer the questions set to him by the panel. Rhys apologises and Martin tells him no one makes a fool out of him. Rhys brings his mother to the hospital and introduces her to Martin. He sits down for a coffee with them and reveals Rhys failed his first interview for the surgical program.

== Priya Kapoor ==
Priya Kapoor, played by Menik Gooneratne, made her first screen appearance on 1 September 2011. Gooneratne's casting was announced in July 2011. The actress previously appeared in Neighbours in 2000 as Shanti Pandya. In December 2011, it was announced Priya and her husband, Ajay (Sachin Joab), would be promoted to the regular cast in early 2012 and their daughter, Rani (Coco Cherian), would be introduced. Priya has been described as "feisty and determined". She married Ajay when they were both young, as they were expecting their daughter, Rani. The couple "unintentionally" put their careers before their marriage and later began suffering from a lack of communication. In October 2012, Priya embarked on an affair with Paul Robinson (Stefan Dennis), which Gooneratne stated made her "feel alive again".

== Lorraine Dowski ==
Lorraine Dowski
- Neighbours character
- Portrayed by: Zoe Bertram
- First appearance: 23 September 2011
- Last appearance: 10 November 2011
- Introduced by: Susan Bower
In-universe information
- Occupation: Cleaner

Lorraine Dowski, played by former Prisoner actress Zoe Bertram, made her first on screen appearance on 23 September 2011. The character and Bertram's casting was announced on 25 July 2011. Bertram had a four-week guest stint as Lorraine and most of her scenes saw her appear opposite Stefan Dennis. Lorraine is a Polish cleaner, who is hired by Dennis' character, Paul Robinson. The character has been described as being "less than diplomatic" and Bertram had to perfect a distinct Polish accent for the part. Of playing her character, Bertram said "She certainly isn't like any of the characters I've played before and the accent was fun." Cameron Adams of the Herald Sun believed Lorraine's accent sounded Russian and fake. He added "not sure why Paul hasn't had a cleaner before now, and hopefully the writers have something in mind here because it all seems a little too random. But in between all her laid-on-thick accent work, she gives Paul some knowledge to use as fuel in his goal to fight City Hall – or at least a planned new shopping centre to which he objects."

Rhys Lawson (Ben Barber) hires Lorraine to clean Number 26 and he recommends her services to Paul Robinson. Lorraine meets with Paul at Charlie's bar to discuss his cleaning needs. Paul puts Lorraine's discretion to the test and she tells him she is not nosey. Paul then hires Lorraine. She tells him that she is involved in the History Wall project and has learnt a lot about Erinsborough. She mentions the old newspaper office is very old and Paul has it preserved. Lorraine accidentally uses Jade Mitchell's (Gemma Pranita) costume skirt as a cleaning cloth and Jade demands she make her a new one. Lorraine does not like Jade's attitude, but she makes the skirt. Jade then sacks Lorraine. When Lorraine goes to the Erinsborough News office to fetch Paul's house keys, she reveals she also cleans for Ajay Kapoor (Sachin Joab). Paul takes Lorraine for coffee and tells her he wants to give her a new job as a reporter. He explains the council have been taking bribes to push through a new development and he suspects Ajay is involved. Lorraine tells Paul she will not spy on her employer, but Paul insists on giving her a phone with a camera. Ajay comes to the Erinsborough News office with Lorraine and gives Paul's phone back. Lorraine informs Paul she quits and Paul tells her he was going to fire her anyway.

== Emilia Jovanovic ==
Emilia Jovanovic
- Neighbours character
- Portrayed by: Freya Stafford
- Duration: 2011–2012
- First appearance: 30 September 2011
- Last appearance: 27 March 2012
- Introduced by: Susan Bower
In-universe information
- Occupation: Hairdresser
- Father: Edgar Jovanovic
- Mother: Angela Jovanovic
- Sisters: Helena Jovanovic
- Nieces: Natasha Williams

Emilia Jovanovic, played by Freya Stafford, made her first on-screen appearance on 30 September 2011. Stafford's casting was announced on 14 July 2011 and she has a six-month contract with the show. She began filming her first scenes at the end of July 2011. The Daily Telegraph reported Emilia is a "glamorous" Serbian hairdresser who works around the world as a hair and make up artist. She is the long lost aunt of Natasha Williams (Valentina Novakovic). Natasha and Emilia have met before, but Natasha was a toddler and does not remember her. The Neighbours official website said Emilia's arrival will dig up a lot of secrets and lies that get the neighbours gossiping and she will play a "pivotal role in Natasha's teenage angst." Of her character, Stafford said "She does stir things up on Ramsay Street, she brings up a lot of baggage for Michael, Sandy Winton's character, so that will be interesting." During an interview with Digital Spy, Winton said Emilia knows more about Michael and his late wife, Helena, than anyone else. This worries Michael and he is scared about what Emilia will tell Natasha. Stafford told TV Week there is a history between Emilia and Michael that makes it difficult for them to get along. She explained "If they dredge up those memories, it'd open a huge can of worms - something they're both reluctant to do. There's an understanding that certain things should be kept until a later date - if not forever." The actress added Emilia is happy when she meets Natasha again and she fills a hole in her life.

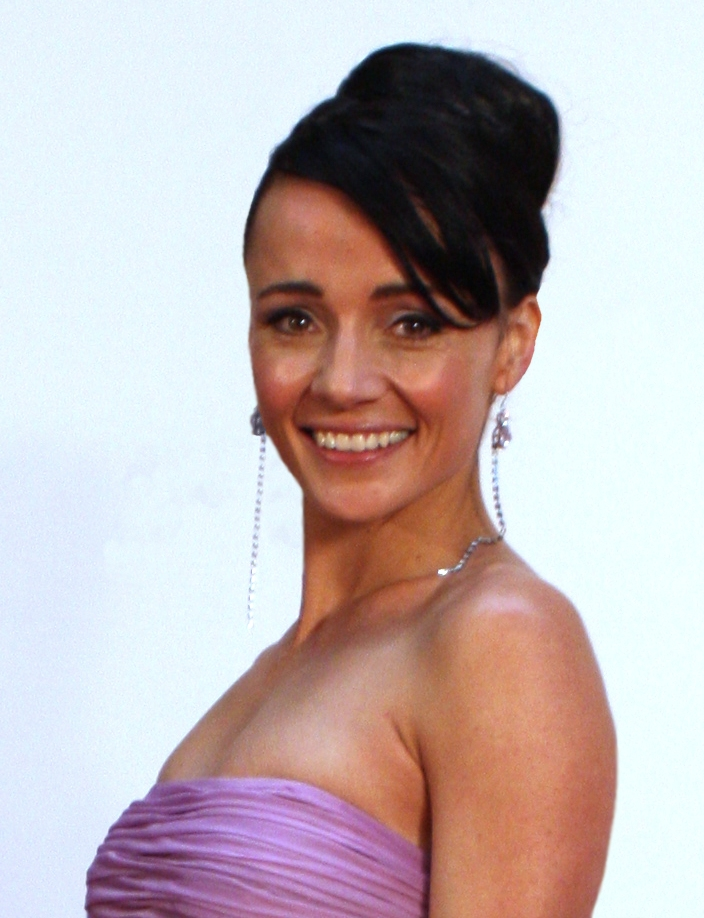
Freya Stafford portrays Emilia

Emilia is working at a fashion shoot, when she notices Natasha Williams and mistakes her for one of the models. She tells her to take a seat, but then realises Natasha is not a model. Natasha, using the name Christine, tells her she had an appointment at her salon, but it was cancelled and she would really like Emilia to do her hair and make up. Emilia obliges and Natasha asks her questions about her family. When Natasha is gone, Emilia checks her receipts and notices Natasha's real name. She realises Natasha is her sister, Helena's daughter. Emilia goes to Erinsborough and observes Natasha with her friends. Emilia turns up at Erinsborough High and she and Natasha go to Charlie's to talk. Natasha asks Emilia about Helena and tells her Michael does not mention her mother. Emilia learns Michael has lied to Natasha about how her sister died. Emilia leaves a birthday gift for Natasha on her doorstep, as she goes to leave, Emilia's car breaks down. Lucas Fitzgerald (Scott Major) spots her and takes the car to his garage to fix. When she finds out Lucas is friends with Michael, Emilia quickly leaves. Emilia calls Lucas when she realises she left her boot in his garage. Emilia meets Lucas in Charlie's bar to collect her boot. Lucas later calls Emilia for an appointment and she comes to his home and waxes his chest. Shortly after leaving Lucas' house, Michael appears and tells her to stay away from Natasha. Emilia tells him he cannot keep the truth about Helena from Natasha forever. Michael gives Natasha's present back to Emilia and tells her to go. Emilia goes to Erinsborough High to see Natasha, but Michael spots her first. They leave and talk about Natasha and Helena. Michael explains to Emilia that Natasha would not be able to handle the fact he has been lying to her.

After canceling a date with Lucas, Emilia is surprised when he turns up at her workplace and invites her to have lunch in his van. Emilia enjoys the date and tells Lucas about her family. She then decides to go to Ramsay Street to see Natasha as it is her birthday. Michael is not happy to see Emilia, but he allows her to stay for Natasha's sake. Emilia tells Lucas that she is related to Michael and Natasha and they have their first kiss. Natasha learns her mother drowned and asks Emilia for the truth about her death. Emilia tells Natasha that when she was younger she wandered into the sea and Helena went in to save her. However, Helena was not a strong swimmer and she got into trouble, Michael could only save Natasha. Michael then asks Emilia to stay away for a while. Natasha asks Emilia to help her care for Michael, following his surgery for a perforated ulcer. Natasha asks Emilia to accompany her and Michael to the beach where Helena died, so they can say goodbye. Emilia tells Michael it is their fault Helena died as they were having sex in his car when she was drowning. Emilia continues to look after Michael until he feels better. Emilia is surprised when Lucas reveals he is not happy with her moonlighting as a nude model. She tells him they need to slow their relationship down. Emilia encourages Michael to return to teaching. When they go to the school to collect some papers, they are locked in a classroom and Michael reveals he likes himself when he is with Emilia. Lucas later tells Emilia that he loves her. Emilia meets Michael and reveals she cannot stop thinking about what happened in the classroom. Michael tells her he hoped he did not give her the wrong idea and that nothing can happen between them. Emilia then gives Lucas a key to her house. Emilia visits Michael at work and she tells him what they had in the past is still there. Michael then kisses her. Emilia tells Lucas he is more invested in their relationship than she is and they break up. Emilia admits she has feelings for Michael and they have sex in his car. Michael later tells her that Chris Pappas (James Mason) knows about them and they decide to tell Natasha they are together. Lucas discovers Emilia and Michael's relationship and he ends his friendship with them both. Emilia performs a cleansing ritual and Natasha later finds a note written by her claiming it was her fault Helena died. Michael explains that he and Emilia were together in The Sandman when Helena drowned. Natasha rejects both Emilia and Michael. Emilia decides to go to Serbia to visit her parents, so Michael can fix things with Natasha. However, Michael chooses to leave with her.

== Dane Canning ==
Dane Canning
- Neighbours character
- Portrayed by: Luke Pegler
- First appearance: 19 October 2011
- Last appearance: 8 December 2011
- Introduced by: Susan Bower
In-universe information
- Occupation: Handyman
- Father: Frank Canning Jr.
- Mother: Jackie Canning
- Brothers: Harley Canning
- Half-brothers: Levi Canning
- Grandmothers: Sheila Canning
- First cousins: Kyle Canning

Dane Canning, played by Luke Pegler, made his first on screen appearance on 19 October 2011. Pegler was cast in the role of Dane after Chris Milligan injured himself while playing football and had to take a break from filming. Jason Herbison of Inside Soap said when show bosses where faced with rewriting weeks of scripts, they decided to introduce a family member of Milligan's character, Kyle. Of how he got the role, Pegler said "I had 20 minutes to decide if I wanted to take the job and be on the set the next morning. They explained to me that Dane has a similar personality to Kyle, which means I could essentially take over his storylines. It was such an unusual opportunity that I couldn't say no." Pegler began filming his first scenes on 16 August 2011 and he had a six-week guest contract. Of Peglar's casting, executive producer Susan Bower said "The show must go on. The beauty of Neighbours is we're about families, so we can pull in a cousin or sibling in these very unusual situations." Pegler wrapped his guest stint on 23 September 2011.

Dane arrives in Erinsborough to take over Kyle's room and keep his business going, while Kyle visits his sick mother. Herbison said Dane's first scene, where Jade Mitchell (Gemma Pranita) meets him, would no doubt become a classic. Jade and Rhys Lawson (Ben Barber) are initially put out by the arrangement, but "they soon warm to Dane's easy charms." Pegler spoke to Milligan about their characters and the actor said "They've come from the same environment and developed the same habits. For example, before they say anything, they feel the need to announce to the world that they're about to speak." The actor added both Dane and Kyle have bravado, but are softies underneath. Pegler explained Dane has "Canning DNA" and is just as oblivious to things around him as Kyle. The actor added Dane would find himself in the middle of some awkward situations. Dane's trademark hair style sees him sporting "striking blond tips." Pegler told Channel 5 that Dane's hairstyle screams "Look at me, dude!", which is not the attention the actor was after. Pegler said he would be making an appointment with a hairdresser to get rid of the blond tips as soon as he was done with filming, and that he would not miss them.

Dane moves into Number 26 and meets Kyle's housemate, Jade. Dane explains Kyle has gone to Frankston to care for his sick mother and they have done a house swap, so Dane can take care of Kyle's business. Jade takes Dane to Harold's Store for coffee and he meets Summer Hoyland (Jordy Lucas) and Jade's sister, Sonya (Eve Morey). Dane reveals he knows all about Sonya and her partner who is working a shopping development, which poses a threat to Kyle's business. Dane speaks to Tony Winstone (Luke Lennox) about the development and Tony tells him the project was pushed through by the council quicker than normal because they were bribed. Dane seeks out Paul Robinson (Stefan Dennis), the editor of the Erinsborough News, and tells him what Tony said. Dane also tells Summer, who decides to run the story on her PirateNet show. Paul tells Dane the story is unfounded, but he should let Summer go ahead with the broadcast. Dane goes to PirateNet and gives Summer the option of pulling the story, but she declines. Dane then asks Andrew Robinson (Jordan Patrick Smith) to speak to Paul, as he does not want Summer to get into trouble if the story is just a rumour. Summer later goes to see Dane and asks him for Tony's name. Dane is initially reluctant to tell her, but eventually gives in.

Rhys purchases a barbecue for the house and he, Dane and Jade throw a party for their friends and neighbours. A few days later, Rhys asks Dane and Jade to leave the house, so he can invite some of his colleagues for dinner. Rhys later calls Dane and explains there is a rat in the barbecue and Dane returns to removes it. Rhys takes Dane for a drink at Charlies to thank him and they try to pick up a couple of women by pretending they are both doctors. However, Karl Kennedy (Alan Fletcher) ruins their plan. Dane is not impressed when Lou Carpenter (Tom Oliver), Kyle's business partner, tries to persuade Lucas Fitzgerald (Scott Major) to sell his garage to the development. Lucas later tells Dane he is not selling. Kyle returns and he and Dane go to the school to remove some graffiti. Dane, Kyle, Jade and Rhys have a Christmas lunch together and Dane reveals Jade was seeing someone while Kyle was away. Dane goes with Kyle to stop Jade from leaving for Sydney. On his last day in Erinsborough, Dane attends a Christmas party at Charlie's then returns to Frankston.

== Jessica Girdwood ==
Jessica Girdwood
- Neighbours character
- Portrayed by: Glenda Linscott
- Duration: 2011–2012, 2014
- First appearance: 16 November 2011
- Last appearance: 10 September 2014
- Introduced by: Susan Bower (2011); Jason Herbison (2014)
In-universe information
- Occupation: Surgeon

Jessica Girdwood, played by Glenda Linscott, made her first on screen appearance on 16 November 2011. The character and casting was announced on 10 November 2011. Linscott had a three-month guest contract with Neighbours. She filmed her scenes in the same studio in which she filmed Prisoner in the 1980s. The actress said "I just love being back and it's hilarious to still see bits and pieces of those days and I even visited the spot where I said my last lines on Prisoner. I also saw the stairs where I threw many an inmate down - luckily my Neighbours character is more gentle." Jessica is described as a "no-nonsense surgeon." She crosses paths with Karl Kennedy (Alan Fletcher) and Rhys Lawson (Ben Barber), while she works at Erinsborough Hospital. In December 2011, a writer for TV Week reported Jessica would find romance with Karl.

Jessica conducts interviews for the surgical team alongside Martin Chambers (John Wood). Jessica tells Rhys Lawson that he comes highly recommended by Martin. During the interview Rhys struggles to answer some of the panel's questions and Jessica is not impressed. Jessica talks to Rhys about saving Chris Pappas' (James Mason) life and tells him he did a good job. Rhys asks Jessica to reconsider letting him join the surgical program. However, Jessica tells him that while he was an impressive candidate, his attitude during the interview was poor. She tells him to reapply next year. Karl Kennedy comes to Jessica and tells her there are rumours about Erin Salisbury (Elise Jansen) having a drinking problem. Jessica admits Erin has had some personal problems recently. Jessica tells Erin to take a few days off. When he learns Erin has quit the surgical program, Rhys asks Jessica to be considered for her place. Jessica tells Rhys that he has missed out on crucial aspects of the program and it would not be fair on him or the other members if he played catch up. Rhys disagrees and asks Jessica if he can sit an exam on the material he has missed. Jessica agrees and when he passes the exam, she puts him into the program.

Jessica and Karl begin training for a fun run together and she asks him out to dinner. Karl accepts and they have a good time. Karl offers to cook for Jessica at his home and at the end of the night, they kiss. Jessica is sympathetic when Karl reveals an old friend has died and that he would like to end their night early. Susan runs into Jessica and reveals she attended the funeral and spent the evening with Karl. Jessica tells Karl that he can have her or Susan, but not both. They later decide to end their relationship. On the day of the fun run, Karl confronts Jessica about their break up and how she has been ignoring him since. Jessica tells Karl that she is not holding a grudge, but her aunt has had an accident and she has to go look after her, which she does not feel like doing after the run. Jessica then asks Karl not to make their three dates out to be anything more than what it was. When Jessica learns that Rhys' hand is better, following an accident, she asks him to assist her in surgery. Vanessa Villante (Alin Sumarwata) later tells Jessica that she thinks Rhys' hand need retesting. Jessica explains to Rhys that it has been brought to her attention that his recovery might not be what it seems and she is worried that he is pushing himself too hard. Jessica makes Rhys resit the tests on his hand and learns that there has been little improvement in his hand, meaning he will not become a surgeon.

Jessica performs a routine throat operation on Georgia Brooks (Saskia Hampele), but her stitches rupture and she is left with permanent scarring on her vocal chords. Georgia confronts Jessica, believing there was medical misconduct, but Jessica assures her that she was just unfortunate. After seeing Karl and Jessica together, Georgia suspects a cover up.

== Erin Salisbury ==
Erin Salisbury
- Neighbours character
- Portrayed by: Elise Jansen
- Duration: 2011–2012
- First appearance: 18 November 2011
- Last appearance: 2 March 2012
- Introduced by: Susan Bower
In-universe information
- Occupation: Surgical intern

Erin Salisbury, played by Elise Jansen, made her first on screen appearance on 18 November 2011. Erin is a surgical intern at Erinsborough Hospital who is romantically pursued by Rhys Lawson (Ben Barber). Jansen told a writer for TV Week that Erin is kind of shy, but confident with her work. Shortly before she appears, Erin breaks up with her boyfriend of five years. Jansen said "So now everything goes into her work and not necessarily her social life or appearance." Jansen said all Erin wears is beige shirts, with the aim to make her look as dowdy as possible. When the actress attended a hair and make-up trial, she had concealer applied to her lips, her eyebrows were lightened and oil was put into her hair. Of Rhys and Erin, Jansen explained "She's a little bit reluctant when he first asks her out. She's so focused, plus it's a bit out of the blue - normally someone like Rhys wouldn't be interested in someone like her. But she's flattered by it and it's lovely to go to dinner with someone and feel there is a connection there. So she gets taken in by his charm. She doesn't know it's all an act." The Herald Sun's Dianne Butler called Erin rude for saying she found Paul Robinson (Stefan Dennis) creepy. Butler commented "Um, she's the one dressed in a bedsheet. I wonder if it'll emerge that Erin is a pioneering family of Erins-borough. The way Kate is Kate Ramsay-Street."

Erin gets onto the surgery program and she and the other interns are given a tour of Erinsborough Hospital by head surgeon, Martin Chambers (John Wood). Erin runs into Rhys Lawson at Charlie's and he buys her a coffee. He asks her to join him, but Erins reveals she has to study. But when Rhys mentions Aidan Foster (Bobby Morley) is coming, Erin decides to stay. Rhys and Erin talk and Kate Ramsay (Ashleigh Brewer) joins them. Erin asks Aidan why he did not turn up at Charlie's and Rhys reveals it was the only way he could get her to stay. Rhys asks Erin out to dinner and she accepts. Erin and Rhys end up having dinner at his house and she stays the night. The next day, Erin is late to work and is given a warning from Martin. Kate tells Erin that Rhys is trying to distract her from her studies, so she will be kicked off the surgical program and Erin slaps Rhys. He explains that Kate is a jealous ex-girlfriend and he is not trying to take her place on the surgical program. Erin believes him and she later confronts Kate, telling her to stay away. Erin and Rhys have dinner together at his house and Rhys accidentally pours champagne on her sleeve. Rhys and Erin kiss and she stays the night.

Erin later tells Rhys they can only be friends, while she is studying for the surgical program. The next day, Erin is late to surgery and Martin gets angry with her. Jessica Girdwood (Glenda Linscott) tells Erin to take a few days off work, following rumours that she has a drinking problem. Erin tells Rhys she has quit the surgical program. Kate runs into Erin and apologises for being crazy, she tells her not to give up on the surgical program. Erin reveals she has already quit and realises Rhys manipulated her and now has her job. Erin and Kate bond over talk about their respective futures. Erin and Kate go to Port Douglas together and Erin gets sick. She and Kate go to a bar and Luke Malliki (Nathan Strauss) flirts with her. Erin and Luke begin dating and he asks to join her and Kate on their trip to Asia. Paul Robinson (Stefan Dennis) finds Erin and asks her where Kate is as she is needed back home. Erin initially refuses to tell Paul where Kate is, but she eventually gives in. Erin says goodbye to Kate and she goes on to Thailand with Luke. Kate later calls Erin via video link for advice about a guy.

== Elaine Lawson ==
Elaine Lawson
- Neighbours character
- Portrayed by: Sancia Robinson
- Duration: 2011–2013
- First appearance: 18 November 2011
- Last appearance: 3 April 2013
- Introduced by: Susan Bower
In-universe information
- Husband: Eddie Lawson (divorced)
- Sons: Rhys Lawson

Elaine Lawson, played by Sancia Robinson, made her first screen appearance on 18 November 2011. Elaine is Rhys Lawson's (Ben Barber) mother. She lives in a care facility as she suffers from a degenerative spinal condition and has to use a wheelchair. When Rhys' father ran out on them both, Rhys was forced to take over caring for Elaine. When Elaine asks Rhys if she can spend the Easter holiday with him in Erinsborough, he makes up an excuse as to why she cannot visit him. Barber told an Inside Soap reporter, "Elaine realises that he's lying, and wonders if Rhys would be ashamed to be seen with her." When Rhys' housemates arrive at the care facility to deliver flowers, Rhys pretends to be visiting a patient, which confirms Elaine's suspicions. Barber explained that Elaine is both hurt and embarrassed when he comes out with that excuse. Rhys tries to make things up to his mother by taking her to the hospital to meet his colleagues, but when she questions his motives for "going public" with her, Rhys has to look at himself and his attitude towards her. In a September 2012 interview, Barber revealed that viewers would get to see more of Elaine, especially when Rhys introduces her to his girlfriend, Vanessa Villante (Alin Sumarwata). When asked if there were any upcoming revelations to do with Elaine, Barber said "We learn more about her marriage to Rhys's father, which may explain why Rhys is the way he is." Robinson, an able-bodied actor, has since expressed remorse about playing a disabled role over potential wheelchair users, comparing it to "blacking up". In 2016, Kate Hood, herself a wheelchair user, portrayed wheelchair user Maxine Cowper.

After his interview for the surgery program at the hospital, Rhys visits his mother at her care home to tell her all about it. Elaine tells Rhys that she is proud of him after he saves the life of Chris Pappas (James Mason). Rhys later brings his colleague, Karl Kennedy (Alan Fletcher), to meet Elaine and she explains how she was diagnosed with her spinal condition when Rhys was only fourteen. She also quizzes Karl on Rhys' job and love life. Elaine asks to spend Easter with Rhys, but he comes up with an excuse as to why she cannot. Elaine believes that Rhys is ashamed of her and when Rhys does not introduce her to his housemates, she is hurt. However, Rhys makes it up to her, after he takes her to the hospital to see his colleagues. Elaine befriends Susan Kennedy (Jackie Woodburne) and they bond over stories about their ex-husbands. Rhys introduces Elaine to his girlfriend, Vanessa Villante, and they get on well after an initial awkward start. Rhys later tells Elaine that he and Vanessa are going to Japan for three months, as he has been offered a place on a study programme. Elaine gives Rhys a ring, so he can propose to Vanessa. When Rhys and Vanessa break up, Elaine encourages her son to fight for her. However, Rhys tells her that Vanessa no longer loves him and gives her the ring back. Rhys informs Elaine that his father has been in contact and he is considering meeting him. Elaine gives Rhys a pile of letters that he wrote to his father and that were returned unopened, telling him to read them first and then make up his mind. A few weeks later, Rhys dies from injuries sustained in an explosion. Elaine and Ajay Kapoor (Sachin Joab) file a civil action against Paul Robinson (Stefan Dennis), as the explosion occurred on his property. Paul offers Elaine a settlement and she considers taking it, while Ajay tries to persuade her to continue with the lawsuit. Elaine tells Vanessa that she is thinking of moving to an assisted living facility near her sister in Tweed Heads. She explains that Paul and Ajay are pressuring her, but she needs to think about her future. Vanessa later tells Paul and Ajay not to harass Elaine anymore. Ajay then apologises to Elaine for putting pressure on her, but vows to continue fighting for justice for his wife and Rhys. Elaine takes the settlement and tells Vanessa that she will be leaving Erinsborough in two weeks.

== Others ==
| Date(s) | Character | Actor | Circumstances |
|---|---|---|---|
| 11 January | Matt Pasquese | Salim Fayad | Matt is a firefighter who attends the call out to the fire at Number 26. Paul Robinson asks him to rescue his son, Andrew Robinson, and tells him that Summer Hoyland and Michael and Natasha Williams are inside. |
| 14 January–17 March | Phil Rochford | Matthew Barker | Superintendent Rochford and Mark Brennan are flashed by Donna Freedman, Kate Ramsay and Jade Mitchell in Charlie's. Rochford and some patrons complain and the girls are cautioned. Rochford takes charge of Paul Robinson's attempted murder case and he later takes a statement from Kate when she confesses to lying in her original one. |
| 28 January–3 March | Vince Villante | Nathaniel Kelly | Vince is an associate of Garland Cole. When Lucas Fitzgerald loses Garland a lot of money, Garland gets Vince to beat him up. Vince later goes to the garage with Garland to pick up car parts from Lucas, but when the police arrive, Vince runs away. |
| 10–15 February | Jeremy Scholton | Andrew Southwell | Jeremy Scholton is a biker involved in illegal street racing. He rides against Lucas Fitzgerald, who throws the race so Jeremy can win. Lucas later runs into Jeremy at the police station and Jeremy reveals that the police wanted to know about the races. |
| 15 February–10 March | Megan Phillips | Cate Commisso | Senior Constable Phillips works with Mark Brennan on a case involving illegal street racing. They pull in Jeremy Scholton for questioning and Lucas Fitzgerald later sees them at Lassiter's Hotel. Mark asks Megan if she has information on the next race and she tells him that her source reckons it will be soon. Mark explains who they are looking for and Megan tells him that she will let the rest of the team know that they are ready. Megan is later seen at a station open day demonstrating self-defence moves. |
| 21 March | Tom Randall | Josh Blau | Tom and Brad meet Kate Ramsay and Jade Mitchell in Charlie's. They buy the girls drinks and they swap stories, before listening to a band and playing pool together. |
| 21 March | Brad Bain | Aaron Jakubenko | Tom and Brad meet Kate Ramsay and Jade Mitchell in Charlie's. They buy the girls drinks and they swap stories, before listening to a band and playing pool together. |
| 21 March–3 May | Sam Wilks | Simon Maiden | Detective Sergeant Wilks tells Mark Brennan to stay away from another officer's leaving drinks and to see a counsellor, after Wes Holland's arrest. Mark later confronts Wilks after his tyres are let down. |
| 24 March–11 August, 6 March 2014 | Reg Pander | Shane Nagle | Reg runs the second-hand shop next to Grease Monkeys. Callum Jones asks him about a stuffed toy monkey and Reg explains that it was from a television show about and there were many of the toys around. A few months later, Natasha Williams sells some records to Reg. Her father, Michael, goes to the store to see if the records are still there and talks to Reg about family. In 2014, Reg gives Matt Turner a statement after Patricia Pappas steals a watch from his shop. |
| 4 April | Vanessa Childs | PiaGrace Moon | Vanessa is brought into the Erinsborough police station, finger printed and charged with theft. Vanessa demands to know when she can go home, but is told that she can only go when her bail is posted. |
| 5 April | Will Jackson | Anthony Pepe | Will is a Zumba instructor and Darren is an electrician. Natasha Williams sets Will up with Chris Pappas first and Summer Hoyland sets Darren up with him after Will leaves. Chris discovers that he has nothing in common with Will and finds it awkward chatting to Darren. |
| 5 April | Darren Rowe | Dylan Russell | Will is a Zumba instructor and Darren is an electrician. Natasha Williams sets Will up with Chris Pappas first and Summer Hoyland sets Darren up with him after Will leaves. Chris discovers that he has nothing in common with Will and finds it awkward chatting to Darren. |
| 18 April | Emily Martin | Renee Burleigh | Emily is a tutor who runs an English study day at Eden Hills University. Emily introduces herself to Andrew Robinson and they discuss a mutual friend, while flirting with each other. |
| 27–28 April | Wes Holland | Daniel Hamill | Constable Wes Holland comes to the used car yard and begins harassing Kyle Canning. Wes threatens Kyle into giving him some money by telling him that he will damage the stock and close the yard down. Kyle later sees Wes having a drink with Mark Brennan. Wes goes back to the car yard and scares off a customer, he later returns and takes money from Kyle. Mark then appears and arrests Wes, starting an investigation into corruption in the force. In 2013, Mark reveals that his death had to be faked when Wes put out a hit on him. However, Wes found him and in the ensuing fight, Wes was killed by the police. Wes's death was shown in the 2014 spin-off series Brennan on the Run, where Wes was portrayed by Ryan Faucett. |
| 13 May | Jonathan Swan | Gary Abrahams | Jonathan is an anaesthetist at the hospital. Karl Kennedy introduces him to his daughter, Libby. Jonathan gives Libby his number and asks her for a tour of the area some time. |
| 1 June | Sarah Campbell | Ellen Carlin | Natasha Williams meets Sarah in Charlie's and compliments her on her top. Sarah invites Natasha to join her and her friends, but Natasha takes Sarah's ID and leaves. |
| 2–20 June | Bethany Peters | Elizabeth Nabben | Bethany is Ivan DeMarco's friend. Ivan introduces Bethany to Natasha Williams, who lies that she is twenty. Bethany remarks that Ivan tends to go for the young ones. When Natasha goes to get some drinks, Bethany notices that her ID belongs to Sarah Campbell, who she knows. Bethany later informs Natasha that Ivan has been showing his friends some naked pictures that Natasha took and sent him. |
| 13 June | Nikki Mays | Fiona Macy | Nikki is one of Jade Mitchell's clients, who likes to invest in businesses if she can see a good return. Jade introduces Nikki to Kyle Canning and she tells him to come up with a business plan for her to look at. Jade thinks Nikki is taking advantage of Kyle because he needs the money and ruins their meeting. Nikki decides not to back Kyle and fires Jade. |
| 21–23 June | Cathy McPhee | Rebecca Macauley | Cathy is the mother of Thomas, Callum Jones' friend. She meets with Toadfish Rebecchi and Sonya Mitchell to discuss a sleepover for their sons. Cathy reveals that she is involved in the high school and the primary school, which overwhelms Sonya. Cathy asks around and finds out about Sonya's past. She then cancels the planned sleepover. |
| 23 June | Thomas McPhee | Calen MacKenzie | Thomas is Cathy McPhee's son and Callum Jones' friend. He and Callum plan a sleepover, but Cathy cancels it when she learns about Callum's mother's past. |
| 28 June–14 July | Patrick Fitzgerald | Brad Liddicoat | Patrick is Daniel and Lucas Fitzgerald's father. He tries calling Lucas, before dying from a heart attack. Patrick is later seen in a flashback. |
| 29–30 June | Judy Forrester | Caroline Stainsby | Judy is a police officer. Michael Williams talks to her about Ivan DeMarco distributing naked photos of his daughter He loses his patience with her, when she tells him they cannot do anything as the laws have not caught up with technology. Michael apologises and Judy wishes they could do more. A few days later, Kate Ramsay asks Judy if she can speak to Superintendent Duncan Hayes. Judy tells her that she cannot get her an appointment unless she knows what Kate wants. Kate decides to leave Judy with a message to gives to Duncan. |
| 1 July–5 December | Danielle Paquette | Georgia Bolton | Danielle is a nurse at Erinsborough Hospital, who helps Jim Dolan and Susan Kennedy out. She is interviewed by Kyle Canning and Jade Mitchell for the spare room at Number 26, but when she sees Lou Carpenter emerge from the shower, she decides not to move in. Danielle and Kyle start flirting with each other and they go out for pizza. Danielle confronts Karl Kennedy and Rhys Lawson about a mistake on a prescription form and Rhys admits it was his fault. Danielle talks to Andrew Robinson about buying his car and later runs into Kyle and his cousin, Dane at Charlie's. |
| 1 July – 10 January 2012 | Peter Noonan | James Saunders | Peter gets in contact with Lucas Fitzgerald to discuss his later father's will. Peter offers Toadfish Rebecchi a job with the company and Toadie accepts. Peter and Toadie begin representing the Hamilton Group, who want to build a new shopping complex. Peter worries Toadie is not committed to the project and later threatens to fire Toadie, if he can not get the development approved. The development gets the go ahead, but Peter is unhappy when he learns the car park needs to be moved. He and Toadie try to purchase to several businesses in Power Road, where the car park is being moved to. When Lucas refuses to accept the offer to buy his garage, Peter pressures Toadie into getting Lucas to sell. Lucas accuses Peter of hiring Lewis Walton to attack his apprentice, Chris Pappas, and Peter is arrested. |
| 4 July | David Sheridan | Benjamin Rigby | David, Rhea, Tammy and Joel are all interviewed by Kyle Canning and Jade Mitchell for the spare room at Number 26. David is an actor who likes to be called Hamlet, Rhea enjoys the Bible, Tammy catches Kyle's eye and Jade is attracted to Joel. All the potential housemates are rejected and Tammy and Joel end up swapping numbers. |
| 4 July | Rhea Thomas | Chloe Boreham | David, Rhea, Tammy and Joel are all interviewed by Kyle Canning and Jade Mitchell for the spare room at Number 26. David is an actor who likes to be called Hamlet, Rhea enjoys the Bible, Tammy catches Kyle's eye and Jade is attracted to Joel. All the potential housemates are rejected and Tammy and Joel end up swapping numbers. |
| 4 July | Tammy Frazer | Teressa Liane | David, Rhea, Tammy and Joel are all interviewed by Kyle Canning and Jade Mitchell for the spare room at Number 26. David is an actor who likes to be called Hamlet, Rhea enjoys the Bible, Tammy catches Kyle's eye and Jade is attracted to Joel. All the potential housemates are rejected and Tammy and Joel end up swapping numbers. |
| 4 July | Joel Howard | Kamran Ozturk | David, Rhea, Tammy and Joel are all interviewed by Kyle Canning and Jade Mitchell for the spare room at Number 26. David is an actor who likes to be called Hamlet, Rhea enjoys the Bible, Tammy catches Kyle's eye and Jade is attracted to Joel. All the potential housemates are rejected and Tammy and Joel end up swapping numbers. |
| 4–14 July | Lucas Fitzgerald, Age 5 | Julian Mineo | A young Lucas and Daniel are seen in flashbacks playing with their father, Patrick. |
| 4–14 July | Daniel Fitzgerald, Age 7 | James Roach | A young Lucas and Daniel are seen in flashbacks playing with their father, Patrick. |
| 6 July – 17 September 2013, 9 February 2015 – 17 February 2016 | Constable Ian McKay | Steve Carroll | Constable McKay tells Duncan Hayes that Mark Brennan has been killed in witness protection. Their conversation is overheard by Toadfish Rebecchi. McKay is one of the police officers who questions lawyer Peter Noonan about his involvement in the beating of Chris Pappas. The following year, McKay helps investigate the apparent arson of Michael Williams' car and serves Toadie with an intervention order. Weeks later, McKay arrests Toadie when he breaks the order and questions Jade Mitchell about an assault. in 2013, Matt Turner asks McKay to do him a favour and pick up a picture from the framers. McKay also takes Brad Willis' statement about the hit-and-run that killed Robbo Slade. In 2015, McKay brings Daniel Robinson, Paige Smith and Tyler Brennan to the station after they get into a fight at Harold's Store. McKay later calls Mark to the station to pick up Tyler. A few months later, Imogen Willis reports her car stolen, but when McKay tells that it has been located and will be towed, she tells him that her friend has texted her to say she has it. McKay warns Imogen against wasting police time. After the police get a tip off about Josh Willis selling illegal peptides, McKay and his partner search Josh's bag and find the drugs. They then take Josh to the station. |
| 8 July – 28 March 2014 | George Pappas | Lliam Amor | George is Chris Pappas' father. He is unhappy to learn Chris has been working at the local garage as a part-time mechanic. Chris tells George that he has quit the basketball team and his job at the gym, so he can work at the garage. George goes through the university preferences guide with Chris and says he found a compromise, mechanical engineering. He tells Chris he has been setting aside some money for the university fees. When George discovers Chris has an apprenticeship at the garage, they argue and George slaps Chris, which prompts Lucas Fitzgerald to punch George. The men apologise to each other and George accepts Chris's career choice. Chris tells his parents that he has been in a relationship with Aidan Foster for a few months and George reveals that he would have accepted the relationship. George is angry and embarrassed when he learns his wife, Patricia, has been a gambling addict for a number of years and has been charged with the theft of a watch. He initially refuses to attend her court hearing, but Chris manages to convince him to come along. |
| 14 July | Carla Turner | Natasha Cunningham | Carla befriends Lucas Fitzgerald and asks him to help her pick a winner in the horse racing. Carla buys him a drink and asks him to pick another for her. They win again and Carla wonders if Lucas made his money by gambling. Lucas decides to leave, but puts down |
| 26 July | Stewart Harman | David Harrison | Stewart is Dean Harman's older brother. Stewart and his friends go to Charlie's and tease Natasha Williams about her appearance. |
| 29 July | Simon Dupont | Jack Starkey-Gill | Simon and Gael are French backpackers, who come to Erinsborough. They ask Andrew Robinson if there is a place for them to stay nearby and Andrew and Summer Hoyland take them to the Men's Shed. |
| 29 July | Gael Moreau | Ben Bordeau | Simon and Gael are French backpackers, who come to Erinsborough. They ask Andrew Robinson if there is a place for them to stay nearby and Andrew and Summer Hoyland take them to the Men's Shed. |
| 2 August – 19 April 2012 | Molly Baker | Gemma-Ashley Kaplan | Molly is a music teacher at Erinsborough High. She teaches Sophie Ramsay the guitar. Molly is later seen taking a photography class and she pairs Callum Jones up with Rani Kapoor. A few weeks later, Molly hands back the marks and sets the class a new assignment. She tells Sophie that she will give her some work to catch up on. |
| 8 August – 10 September 2013 | Gary Denham | Anthony West | Gary is an estate agent. He conducts the auction of the Community Gardens and is later hired by Karl Kennedy to find him an apartment. Priya Kapoor and Susan Kennedy also hire his services to find them new homes. Gary conducts inspections of 32 Ramsay Street and tells Natasha Williams that she can try to put potential buyers off, but the house will sell. Gary returns to Ramsay Street to conduct the sale of Number 24. The following year, Gary hosts the auctions for a Lassiter's apartment and Number 32 on behalf of Lucas Fitzgerald. |
| 8 August | Marge Baker | Maria Papas | Marge and Barney are bidders who unsuccessfully compete against Sonya Mitchell at the auction for the Community Gardens. |
| 8 August | Barney Smith | David MacRae | Marge and Barney are bidders who unsuccessfully compete against Sonya Mitchell at the auction for the Community Gardens. |
| 23 August | Kendra Kimmel | Hannah Jones | Kendra works at the Erinsborough Gym. She monitors and offers encouragement to Kyle Canning and Rhys Lawson during their circuit workouts. |
| 1 September – 25 May 2012 | Adrian Pearce | Christopher Waters | Adrian is a surgeon and friend of Martin Chambers. Adrian joins Martin, Rhys Lawson and Karl Kennedy for a round of golf. Adrian later attends a party thrown by Rhys at his house. Adrian tells Karl that he has seen his flyer asking for band members and reveals he can play bass. Karl then invites him to join his band, along with Ajay Kapoor, and the band plays their first gig at Charlie's. Adrian quits when he becomes fed up with Karl and Ajay's arguing. |
| 8–27 September | Erik Poulos | Ivan Bradara | Erik gives Andrew Robinson a deposit to find him a specific car that he has been after for ages. Erik starts to grow impatient with Andrew and threatens to take his money back. But Lucas Fitzgerald eventually finds the car and Erik pays Andrew the rest of the money. |
| 9 September–6 December | Warren Burrell | Tony Rickards | Warren takes his son's car to Carpenter's Mechanics for a service. He tells Chris Pappas and Lucas Fitzgerald that he thinks his son is gay and makes bad comments about gay people. Warren later returns with his son, Blake, and makes more derogatory comments. Chris tells him to stop as he is gay. Warren threatens Chris when he finds him hanging out with Blake. After Chris is attacked, Lucas finds Warren to ask him where he was at the time. Warren states that he was at work and is backed up by his colleagues. |
| 19 September | Steve Barnes | Nicholas Gunn | Steve and Jamie go to Charlie's for a drink. Steve bumps into Kyle Canning at the pool table and then he and Jamie mock a petition calling for a new shopping centre development to be stopped. Steve confronts Rhys Lawson when he believes he has been flirting with his girlfriend. Kyle tells him to leave and the group go outside, where Kyle and Steve square up to each other. Rhys walks away and Steve punches Kyle. |
| 19 September | Jamie Marr | Edwin Boyce | Steve and Jamie go to Charlie's for a drink. Steve bumps into Kyle Canning at the pool table and then he and Jamie mock a petition calling for a new shopping centre development to be stopped. Steve confronts Rhys Lawson when he believes he has been flirting with his girlfriend. Kyle tells him to leave and the group go outside, where Kyle and Steve square up to each other. Rhys walks away and Steve punches Kyle. |
| 21 September–2 November | Helena Williams | Camilla Jackson | Helena is the late wife of Michael Williams. After their daughter, Natasha, starts asking questions about how she died, Michael begins seeing visions of Helena. |
| 11–28 October | Amy Holdsworth | Andrea Powell | Amy Holdsworth is a therapist at Erinsborough Hospital, who is visited by Michael Williams. He talks to Amy about his late wife and his daughter, Natasha, before asking for some help with insomnia. |
| 19 October | Janet Green | Briony Williams | Janet comes to Erinsborough High to assess Kate Ramsay's progress on her teaching course. Janet is surprised when Kate messes her lesson up and leaves the classroom. Janet tells Kate that she will have to fail her, but Noah Parkin reveals Kate just learnt of her ex-boyfriend's death and Janet rearranges Kate's assessment. |
| 19–25 October | Tony Winstone | Luke Lennox | Tony is a surveyor working on behalf of the council and the Hamilton Group's shopping development. While setting up his equipment, Tony implies to Dane Canning that the council have accepted money to rush the development through. Summer Hoyland talks to Tony about the corruption story and Tony tells her he was just winding Dane up. He heard the information from a tea lady who had just been fired, so she probably lied. |
| 27 October | Joe Shore | Matt Dean | Jade Mitchell notices Joe at the bar in Charlie's and they smile at each other. Just as she gets up to approach him, his girlfriend, Jess, arrives. |
| 27 October | Jess Walker | Sarah Roberts | Jade Mitchell notices Joe at the bar in Charlie's and they smile at each other. Just as she gets up to approach him, his girlfriend, Jess, arrives. |
| 1–2 December | Blake Burrell | Oliver Edwin | Blake is Warren Burrell's son. He brings his car to the garage and befriends Chris Pappas. Blake goes to Charlie's and apologises to Chris and Lucas for his father's behaviour. Chris and Blake play pool together and Blake invites Chris to a football game. Warren arrives and orders Blake to leave. Blake later returns to the garage to apologise for his father again. |
| 5 December – 18 January 2012 | Lewis Walton | Andy McPhee | Lewis is hired by Peter Noonan to sabotage Fitzgerald Motors and attack Chris Pappas. Lewis disappears after the attack, but Lucas Fitzgerald manages to find him at the dog racing track and Lewis is later arrested for assault. |
| 9 December – 18 January 2013 | Anna Hauser | Isabel Macmaster | Anna is a receptionist at Simmons & Colbert, who tries to stop Lucas Fitzgerald from seeing Peter Noonan. She later informs Toadfish Rebecchi that he is not allowed into the offices, while he is being investigated for fraud and assault. However, she allows him access to her computer. Anna is approached by Lucas who tries to get her to identify the man who attacked Chris Pappas and she tells him about the man's tattoo. In January 2013, Anna tells Ajay Kapoor that she has packed up his personal items, following his decision to leave the law firm. |
