= Michael Williams (Neighbours) =

- Neighbours character
- Portrayed by: Sandy Winton
- Duration: 2010–2012
- First appearance: 4 May 2010
- Last appearance: 23 May 2012
- Introduced by: Susan Bower
In-universe information
- Occupation: Principal and teacher at Erinsborough High School (2010–12)
- Father: Robert Williams
- Mother: Jennifer Williams
- Wife: Helena Jovanovic (until 1995)
- Daughters: Natasha Williams
- Granddaughters: Evelyn Robinson

Michael Williams is a fictional character from the Australian soap opera Neighbours, played by Sandy Winton. The actor's casting was announced in March 2010 and he admitted the role would be challenging, but he would be up to the task. Michael was introduced as the new principal of Erinsborough High, replacing Daniel Fitzgerald (Brett Tucker). The character made his debut screen appearance during the episode broadcast on 4 May 2010. In November 2011, it was announced that Winton would be leaving Neighbours and Michael departed on 27 March 2012. However, the character made a brief reappearance on 23 May 2012.

Before his arrival on screen, a reporter for TV Week said it looked like Michael would break a few hearts among the mother's club, while a writer for the soap's official website described him as hunky. Michael is an outdoorsy, blue-collar guy with a passion for teaching. During an interview for Channel 5, Winton said he is similar to Michael in the way that they both enjoy surfing and living life to enjoy it. Shortly after his arrival, Michael began a rivalry with Paul Robinson (Stefan Dennis), but he proves that he is a worthy contender by putting Paul in his place. Michael is a widower with one daughter, Natasha (Valentina Novakovic), and his storylines often revolved around their family dynamic. When he struggled with her behaviour, Michael disowned Natasha and forced her to take responsibility for her own actions.

Michael had a brief relationship with Ruby Rogers (Yesse Spence), before embarking on an affair with Paul's wife, Rebecca (Jane Hall). Michael was devastated when Rebecca left and Winton believed Michael had thought he had found the one. When Natasha is seen asking her father for more information about her late mother, executive producer Susan Bower said Michael was hiding a secret that would change their lives forever. Michael's sister-in-law, Emilia Jovanovic (Freya Stafford), was introduced to the show and it was revealed that she and Michael were having an affair when Natasha's mother drowned. Michael's feelings for Emilia resurface and he becomes involved in a love triangle with her and his best friend, Lucas Fitzgerald (Scott Major).

== Casting ==
In March 2010, the Neighbours official website announced Sandy Winton had joined the cast in the regular role of Michael Williams. Winton relocated from Sydney to Melbourne for the role. Winton's character was introduced as part of a new family and he arrived with his teenage daughter, Natasha Williams (Valentina Novakovic). Michael took over the job of Principal at Erinsborough High School, replacing Daniel Fitzgerald (Brett Tucker). Winton admitted his new role might prove to be challenging, but he was up to the task. TV Week reported Michael was "set to break a few hearts among the mothers' club" following his arrival in May. In November 2010, Winton told Channel 5 that he was loving his time with Neighbours and added "I'm probably having the best time I've had in the last 15 years of acting."

== Development ==
=== Characterisation ===
Michael was a teacher and vice principal at a rural high school, before he was offered the role of principal at Erinsborough High. Network Ten describe Michael as a "laconic, outdoorsy Aussie bloke in his late thirties." They add that he is a "blue-collar guy from blue-collar stock, and spent most of his teens surfing and feeling aimless. After an inspiring teacher helped him find focus in life, he realised he had a passion for teaching. Holy Soap say that Michael is in "complete control in the classroom", though things at home are different with Natasha. Winton said he is like Michael in the way that he enjoys surfing and living life to enjoy it. He later explained "Like him, I love hanging around at the beach and surfing. I'm laid-back too, and Michael's approach to life is to not take things too seriously."

In September 2010, executive producer Susan Bower told Jason Herbison of Inside Soap that the team struggled to find the "core of the character" at first, but they had now hit their stride and there would be some exciting stories coming up for him. Michael clashes with Paul Robinson (Stefan Dennis) shortly after he arrives in Ramsay Street. However, Michael is able to prove that he is a "worthy contender" and puts Paul in his place. Michael and Paul's rivalry reappears when Michael becomes involved with Paul wife. When she leaves, Paul becomes involved with the school to maintain the rivalry with Michael. However, Winton believed Michael's focus was more on his daughter than what Paul Robinson was plotting for him next.

=== Family ===
Michael is a widower with one daughter, Natasha. In order to form the father-daughter bond needed for their respective roles, Winton invited Novakovic to his home to meet his family. He also met with her family, so they were comfortable together on and off screen. Winton revealed he felt "fatherly" towards Novakovic and that they slipped into the father-daughter roles very easily. Natasha is Michael's only child and Bower revealed that she has him "wrapped around her finger." Michael dotes on his daughter, but Natasha often embarrasses him to get his attention. Winton thought Michael was not handling things with Natasha "too poorly", but she does make it difficult for him. During a 2011 interview with Channel 5, Winton believed Michael and Natasha's relationship had become a tortured. Winton stated that Michael wishes Natasha would stop lying to him and he hoped she would "get her act together so they can have some semblance of a father/daughter relationship." Winton also wanted his character to build a better relationship with his daughter in the future as he loves her, despite the things she has done. Michael feels like he is failing as a father following Natasha's nude photo scandal. He is disappointed with the choices his daughter has made and Winton said Michael is at his wits end.

"Tash is Michael's everything. Michael would like her to think that it wouldn't be easy to get back on his good side, but I think he is a bit of a softie in the way that he can always see the positive in Tash. He loves her more than anything."

— Winton on Michael's love for his daughter

In June 2011, Susan Hill of the Daily Star revealed Michael would disown Natasha after he cannot keep her on the straight and narrow. Michael is left in despair after Natasha causes more problems for him when she sprays some derogatory graffiti about herself around the street. Natasha plays the victim and Michael initially feels sorry for his daughter, but he later discovers that she was behind the graffiti. Michael decides to go to the police and report Natasha. Of Michael's decision, Winton told Daniel Kilkelly of Digital Spy, "Michael is at a stage where he's just reaching out for anything that will get through to Tash and he realises that may not be the way to go. It's the last option to be going to the police but he's thinking, 'Right, I'm going to make her take responsibility for her own actions'." However, Jade Mitchell (Gemma Pranita) talks Michael out of it, by telling him about how her sister had to take responsibility for her actions by herself. Michael feels he has run out of options and he tells Natasha that he no longer cares about what she gets up to.

Kilkelly said Michael's decision to revoke all responsibility for Natasha and her actions is quite shocking. Winton told him Michael believes Natasha needs to deal with her own mistakes herself as she is eighteen. He said Michael's choice was valid, but was unsure if it was the right one. On whether the storyline would explore why Natasha has been acting out so much, Winton said "I think the storyline will and does explore that. If you look at the fact she has a single father who is raising her and she's a woman at the age where she is wanting to discover herself, it is a tough time. I think not having a good cop, bad cop or not having a mother around to help with the disciplining in order to look after her as a woman coming into the world, it's got to be a fairly tough thing." Natasha and Michael eventually make amends, but it is not an easy journey and they have a lot to work through. Bower later teased a storyline which shows the beginning of Natasha wanting to find out more about her late mother. Bower told Kilkelly that the secret would be revealed in three parts, which would change Natasha and Michael's lives forever."

In July 2011, it was announced Natasha's estranged aunt, Emilia Jovanovic (Freya Stafford), would be introduced. Winton said Emilia knows more about Michael and his late wife, Helena (Camilla Jackson), than anyone else. This worries Michael and he is scared of what Emilia will tell Natasha. Winton explained Michael has not really told Natasha much about her mother and the actor promised the storyline would uncover some dark secrets, which build up to a monumental reveal. Michael's desperation to stop Natasha discovering the truth about her mother's death takes a toll on his health and he begins seeing a therapist. Michael's problems get worse when he finds a package for Natasha on his doorstep, which contains some of his late wife's personal belongings. Michael then comes face to face with his sister-in-law for the first time in fifteen years. An argument breaks out and Michael tells Emilia if she reveals the truth about her sister's death to Natasha, he will never forgive her. Natasha eventually discovers Helena died from drowning and that she was also in the water, but Michael rescued her. Novakovic explained that Michael could not save Helena and Natasha because he was too late getting there. Emilia, Michael and Natasha eventually go to the beach where Helena died to say goodbye. Novakovic said it is an emotional time, but Michael is funny about it.

=== Relationships ===
==== Ruby Rogers ====
Michael meets Ruby Rogers (Yesse Spence) in September 2010. Ruby is an Australian who lives in Britain. While backpacking with her cousin, Poppy (Gabriella Darlington), she ends up in Erinsborough where she meets Michael. Natasha and Poppy "reluctantly" push Michael and Ruby together and they begin a brief, but fun relationship. Natasha initially has a problem with her father being involved with someone, but she realises Michael is happy and enjoying himself. When asked if Ruby shows Michael a good time, Winton said "Yeah, it's been a while for him since he had a relationship at all. So it's nice, it's a whole lot of fun." Winton explained Ruby and Michael go surfing and they end up having an entire relationship in one day before Ruby leaves for the UK. Michael is sad when the relationship ends, but Winton said he is not devastated and he would get over it. In December, Jordy Lucas (who plays Summer Hoyland) called for Ruby's return, saying it was nice for Michael to have a strong connection with her.

==== Rebecca Robinson ====
In November 2010, Rebecca Robinson (Jane Hall) finds herself drawn to Michael. Michael discovers that they share the same taste in music and they develop a good friendship. Hall said "Mike is really the antithesis of Paul and he just starts to look like a great option to Rebecca. He's this squeaky-clean, genuine guy, while all Rebecca can see in Paul is deceit and a web of lies with a shadowy history." Rebecca sees Michael "as a breath of fresh air" and there is a chemistry between them. When Rebecca becomes involved with the School Social dance, Michael realises that he has feelings for her. Michael finds he is able to talk to Rebecca about his problems with Natasha and after they become closer, Michael and Rebecca eventually begin an affair. Hall told Channel 5 that she loved Michael and Rebecca's relationship, as she was getting fed up of her character going back for more from Paul. Hall believed Rebecca and Michael were well suited and she enjoyed working with Winton.

Paul notices Rebecca's bond with Michael and he forces her to renew their wedding vows, devastating Michael in the process. Michael struggles watching Rebecca's declaration of love for Paul and when she tries to explain, Michael backs off and tells her that the situation is too complicated for him. Rebecca confesses to Michael that she pushed Paul from the Lassiter's Hotel mezzanine and he is now blackmailing her to stay with him. Michael agrees to wait for Rebecca and she manages to leave Paul. However, Paul tries to get revenge on the couple and Rebecca decides to leave the country. Winton said Michael is "pretty devastated, lonely and trying to find his way again" after losing Rebecca. He also opined Michael had thought he had found the one. When asked if Michael will find love again, Winton revealed "Well I hope so, with Rebecca gone, it's been a long time between drinks." Winton later said Michael could do with someone to talk to, as Rebecca never calls him.

==== Emilia Jovanovic ====
During the 2011 season cliffhanger, it was revealed Emilia and Michael were having an affair at the same time Helena died. In January 2012, a writer for TV Week stated "When it comes to matters of the heart, Michael is renowned for being a closed book - but this year, Emilia is set to change all that." Michael starts growing closer to Emilia when they partake in an impromptu surfing lesson. Winton explained there is a spark and an attraction between Emilia and Michael that has been there from a long time ago. The TV Week writer said the "scandalous new pairing brings with it plenty of drama" as Emilia is dating Michael's best friend, Lucas Fitzgerald (Scott Major). Michael tries to shut Emilia out and Winton said he does this because he cares for her a lot, but he does not want to make the situation messy. The actor said the big problem is what happened between them in the past, but also Emilia's relationship with Lucas.

When Lucas learns Emilia moonlights as a nude model, he admits he is uncomfortable with it. However, Michael is "accepting and understanding" of Emilia's activity and she believes she has more in common with him than Lucas. Michael later realises he has fallen for Emilia, but he is scared to admit his feelings to her. He knows it is wrong, but he cannot help the way he feels. Lucas and Emilia break up and Michael struggles to keep his distance from his sister-in-law. Michael later "seizes the moment" and tells Emilia he is falling for her. They begin a relationship, but decide to keep the news from Lucas to "spare his feelings." However, Lucas starts to believe Michael and Emilia are more than good friends and Michael confirms his suspicions.

=== Departure ===
On 7 November 2011, it was announced that the character would be leaving Neighbours. Daniel Kilkelly of Digital Spy reported Michael would leave in 2012, but Natasha would remain in the show. Of Michael and Winton's departures, Bower said "The Michael Williams character will be leaving Ramsay Street as part of a significant story coming up in April. Sandy's contribution to the show has been superb, enabling the character to be part of some milestone storylines. Michael made his final screen appearance on 27 March 2012. It was later revealed that Winton would make a brief appearance as Michael on 23 May 2012.

== Storylines ==
Michael moves to Erinsborough with his daughter, after he is given the position of Principal at the local high school. Having previously worked at a rural high school, Michael implements some new ideas, such as letting students refer to the teachers by their first name and asking them to come to him with suggestions on how to improve the school. Libby Kennedy (Kym Valentine) is not impressed and she and Michael clash. When Michael sees Natasha's provocative posters for PirateNet, he asks Paul Robinson to remove them. Paul refuses and Michael threatens to sue him. He backs down when Natasha and Andrew Robinson (Jordan Patrick Smith) change the posters. Michael becomes friends with Lucas Fitzgerald and he gives him a job teaching technical classes at the school. While he is out to dinner with Natasha and her new boyfriend, Kyle Canning (Chris Milligan), Michael is forced to break up a fight between Kyle and Chris Pappas (James Mason). Michael notices Chris was defending Andrew and he tries to talk to him, but Chris pushes him away. Michael later asks Chris if he thinks he is gay and Chris comes out, with Michael's support.

Michael meets Ruby Rogers and they go on a couple of dates. They decide to have an entire relationship in one day, before Ruby's departure. Michael asks Ruby to stay with him, but she declines. Michael throws himself into organising the School Social and he bonds with Rebecca Robinson. Rebecca and Michael almost kiss, when she tells him things between her and Paul are not good. Michael is devastated when he witnesses Paul and Rebecca renewing their wedding vows. Rebecca gives him a letter explaining her feelings for him before she goes away to Oakey. When Number 26 catches fire, Michael rushes inside to rescue Natasha. The firefighters get Natasha and Summer Hoyland (Jordy Lucas) out, but the roof collapses trapping Michael and Andrew. They are eventually rescued and taken to the hospital. Rebecca returns and tells Michael she wants to be with him, but leaving Paul will be difficult. Michael tells her he loves her. Andrew tells Michael that Natasha is pregnant, which initially anger him, but he tells his daughter he will support her. Rebecca shocks Michael when she confesses to pushing Paul from the Lassiter's Hotel mezzanine.

Rebecca leaves Paul and moves in with Michael. Paul discovers the relationship and tries to sabotage Michael's career, by getting him suspended. Michael proposes to Rebecca and she accepts. However, she decides to leave the country with her family, when she realises Paul will not stop trying to get revenge on her. Summer reveals Natasha lied about being pregnant and Michael tells his daughter that he no longer trusts her. Michael's job suspension is lifted and on his return to the school, he learns Paul has been voted onto the school board. Michael installs a no uniform policy, which is supported by Libby. However, after unrest from students and parents, Michael concedes defeat and scraps the policy. When Michael learns Natasha is dating Ivan DeMarco (Ben Knight), he tells her to break off the relationship. He later discovers there are naked pictures of Natasha on the internet and he confronts his daughter. Natasha denies taking the pictures and believing Ivan took them, Michael punches him. Michael comforts Natasha when someone sprays derogatory graffiti about her around the street. However, he discovers Natasha was behind the graffiti and he decides to disown her.

Michael's relationship with Natasha deteriorates further, when he finds out she paid for rhinoplasty with his credit card. He also learns she sold some of his records and he tells her she sold the last thing her mother, Helena, ever gave him. Michael is also upset at the loss of a photograph, featuring his late wife, which was inside one of the records. Michael decides to send Natasha to boarding school, but he changes his mind, after Natasha nearly drowns. Michael gets his photo back and his relationship with Natasha improves. He discovers Natasha has been searching for information about her mother and he invites her to ask him questions about Helena. Natasha asks him how her mother died, and Michael lies to her. Natasha finds the photo which shows her with her parents at the beach and she asks Michael about it. He tells her they only went to the beach once and then tries to avoid the subject. Michael becomes angry with Summer when a picture of Helena ends up on a school notice board. He starts seeing visions of Helena and when he learns Natasha is trying to contact members of her mother's family, the stress leads him to see a therapist.

Michael finds a birthday gift for Natasha on his doorstep and realises it is from Helena's sister, Emilia. He later spots Emilia in the street and tells her to stay away from Natasha. Emilia asks Michael why he has not told Natasha the truth about her mother's death and Michael explains Natasha would not be able to handle the truth. He becomes angry with Emilia when she turns up at his house on Natasha's birthday. However, he allows her to stay for Natasha's sake. Natasha learns her mother drowned and asks Michael for the truth. Emilia explains that Michael failed to save Helena from drowning at the beach. Natasha later realises she was in the water too and Michael confesses that he could not save the both of them. Michael's stress continues to affect his health and he starts taking some pills. Michael discovers Summer has cheated during her English exam, they argue and Michael collapses. He undergoes surgery for a perforated stomach ulcer and does not recall his argument with Summer. Natasha asks Emilia to help care for Michael. Natasha asks Michael and Emilia to go to the beach where Helena died, so they can say goodbye. Michael and Emilia then reveal they were having sex in his car, while Helena was drowning.

Michael starts growing closer to Emilia and they spend time surfing together. Emilia encourages Michael to return to teaching and he quits his job as principal. Michael struggles to adjust to Priya Kapoor's (Menik Gooneratne) changes and when he is told to write lesson plans, he throws them away. He later returns to the school with Emilia to retrieve them. They hide from Priya under a desk in a classroom. Michael later tells Emilia he likes himself when he is with her. Emilia meets Michael and reveals she cannot stop thinking about what happened between them in the classroom. Michael tells her he hoped he did not give her the wrong idea and that nothing can happen between them. Emilia visits Michael at work and she tells him what they had in the past is still there. Michael then kisses her. While supervising some repair work to a school bathroom, Michael starts to suffer flashbacks to the day he collapsed outside it. He remembers Summer cheated and confronts her, urging her to tell Priya. Emilia breaks up with Lucas and confesses her feelings for Michael. They have sex in his car and Chris finds out. Michael and Emilia then reveal to Natasha that they are together, but they agree not to tell her the truth about the day Helena died.

Lucas finds out about Michael and Emilia and ends his friendship with them both. Natasha finds a note written by Emilia saying it was her fault Helena died and she confronts her and Michael. Michael explains that he and Emilia were together in The Sandman when Helena drowned. Angered by the news, Natasha takes the panel van and sets it on fire. When Michael learns Lucas is being blamed for the fire, he goes to the police station and tells them it was his fault the van caught fire. Natasha finds him there covering for her and she tells him that she wants nothing to do with him. Michael is upset when Emilia decides to leave for Serbia. Natasha tells him that if he wants to fix the problems between them, he has to leave her alone. Michael then decides to leave for Serbia with Emilia. Michael later calls Natasha to tell her the house has sold.

== Reception ==
TV Week said that it was about time Neighbours introduced "a hunky man with a few more years on his side". Holy Soap said Michael's most memorable moment was "Seeing his daughter kitted out in a skimpy outfit on the PirateNet poster." Michael came second in an Inside Soap poll to find out which soap character readers would most like to have as their headteacher. He received 34% of the vote. Gemma Graham and Jon Horsley of TV Buzz said that "nothing stays quiet for long in Ramsay Street, so we're not sure who Michael and Emilia thought they were kidding trying to keep their relationship under wraps."
