= Glenda Linscott =

Australian actress and director (born 1958)

- Born: 1958 (age 67–68); Rhodesia
- Education: National Institute of Dramatic Art (BFA)
- Occupations: Actress, director
- Notable work: Prisoner (1985–86); Murder Call (1997–2000)
- Spouse: Richard Buckham (m.1989)

Glenda Linscott (born 1958) is an Australian actress and director, born in Rhodesia (now Zimbabwe) of English descent, best known internationally for her performance in the cult drama series Prisoner as tough bikie inmate and top dog Rita "The Beater" Connors and in the series Murder Call.

== Career ==
Linscott was born in Rhodesia, before briefly immigrating to England, and finally to Adelaide, Australia, as a child. A graduate of the National Institute of Dramatic Art (NIDA), Linscott's most notable role is Network Ten prison drama Prisoner, for which she first appeared towards the end of the seventh season in 1985. Her character (Rita "The Beater" Conners) became immensely popular during the final season in 1986, despite the show's decline in ratings at that time. Before appearing on the show, Linscott gained much research on women prisoners and approached the New South Wales Department of Correctional Services and organised to spend some time inside one of their maximum security prisons. She also did extensive research on bikie gangs, spending a lot of time with real-life bikie Ian Doig who played her boyfriend "Slasher" in the series.

She later returned to Britain when she appeared in a stage play version of Prisoner. Guest roles include A Country Practice, All Saints and McLeod's Daughters. She also had a recurring role in the Australian drama, Murder Call as Pathologist, Dr. Imogen Soames between 1997 and 2000.

In November 2011, it was announced Linscott had joined the cast of Neighbours for three months as Dr. Jessica Girdwood, a surgeon at the Erinsborough Hospital. She made her first on screen appearance that same month.

In 2022 Linscott gave a rare interview with Prisoner podcast Talking Prisoner where she talked extensively about her time on the show.

On 20 November 2025, it was announced that Linscott was a part of the extended cast of ABC series Treasure & Dirt.

In April 2026, Linscott returned to theatre for the Importance of Being Earnest for the South Australian State Theatre Company.

== Personal life ==
Linscott met ABC Radio Australia producer Richard Buckham in 1985 and they married in early 1989.

== Other activities ==
In 2015 she took up the position of Head of Acting at the Western Australian Academy of Performing Arts (WAAPA) until she stepped down from the position in 2022. As of 2023, Linscott was a guest director of theatre at Flinders University.

== Filmography ==
=== Film ===
Year	Title	Role	Notes
1987	Howling III: The Marsupials	Bahloo	Feature film
1993	Big Ideas	Lix Dixon	TV movie
1995	Back of Beyond	Mary Margaret	Feature film
2001	The Man Who Sued God	Co-plaintiff	Feature film
2002	The Nugget	Bunny	Feature film
2005	Deck Dogz	Exboobs	Feature film
2006	Jindabyne	Detective	Feature film
2009	Transformation	Amanda	Short film
2011	Underbelly Files: Infiltration	Sandra	TV movie
2011	Game	(Not acting)	Short film – writer & director

=== Television ===
Year	Title	Role	Notes
1984	The Cowra Breakout	Heather	Miniseries
1985-1986	Prisoner	Rita Connors	Seasons 7–8, 106 episodes
1986	Kids 21st Birthday Channel Ten Telethon	Guest - Herself with Prisoner cast: Colette Mann, Elspeth Ballantyne, Jane Clifton & Val Lehman taped appearance	TV special
1987	Rafferty's Rules	P.C. Waterman	Season 1, episode 13
1990	A Country Practice	Vera Charles	Season 10, episodes 61 & 62
1991	The Miraculous Mellops	Professor Moorcroft	Season 1, episodes 3, 11 & 13
1995	Janus	Kathy Tainsh	Season 2, episode 9
1995	Soldier Soldier	Betty Palmer	Season 5, episode 6
1997–2000	Murder Call	Dr. Imogene 'Tootsie' Soamses	Seasons 1–3, 31 episodes
2001	All Saints	Anna Murchinson	Season 4, episode 31
2003	MDA	Gretle Celeste	Season 2, episode 1
2004	Fergus McPhail	Gabrielle	Season 1, episodes 15 & 16
2004	McLeod's Daughters	Celia Rivers	Season 4, episode 13
2006	Real Stories	Jesse Martin's Mother	Season 1, episode 3
2013	Miss Fisher's Murder Mysteries	Mrs. Biggs	Season 2, episode 4
2011–15	Neighbours	Jessica Girdwood	Seasons 27–28 & 30
2011–16	Winners & Losers	Lily Patterson	Seasons 1 & 4 (guest, 8 episodes)
2020	The Heights	Eva	Season 2, episode 8
2026	Treasure & Dirt	Packenham	TV series
