= Ajay Kapoor (Neighbours) =

- Neighbours character
- Portrayed by: Sachin Joab
- Duration: 2011–2013
- First appearance: 13 July 2011
- Last appearance: 12 July 2013
- Introduced by: Susan Bower
In-universe information
- Occupation: Lawyer; Councillor
- Wife: Priya Kapoor (until 2013)
- Daughters: Rani Kapoor

Ajay Kapoor is a fictional character from the Australian television soap opera Neighbours, played by Sachin Joab. He made his first screen appearance during the episode broadcast on 13 July 2011. The actor was cast in the role following a successful audition. The part was initially going to last for about a month, but the producers liked him and the character. They then decided to create a family unit around Ajay and later introduced his wife Priya (Menik Gooneratne). Five months later it was announced that Joab and Gooneratne would be promoted to the regular cast in early 2012, while their on-screen daughter, Rani (Coco Cherian), would be introduced. The Kapoor's arrival marked the show's first family with Indian and Sri Lankan heritage and the first family to be introduced since 2010. Ajay departed on 12 July 2013.

Ajay was raised and educated in Erinsborough and became a lawyer. When he wanted to get involved in public service, he got a seat on the local council, which gave him an instant role with the community. Joab described Ajay as being "pretty positive" and stated that he does everything for his family. Ajay is married to Priya, the principal of the local high school. The couple had to get married when they were young because they were expecting their daughter. Both Priya and Ajay unintentionally put their careers before their marriage and Joab thought that they had forgotten about living in the moment. Paul Robinson (Stefan Dennis) began a rivalry with Ajay shortly after his arrival. When Ajay rejected his offer to help with his re-election campaign, Paul started to look for ways to destroy and discredit him.

== Casting ==
Joab told DJ Nihal from the BBC Asian Network that his agent got him the audition for Neighbours. The actor had to ask his agent if he needed to put on an Indian or Arabic accent for the part, but was told to speak in his natural Australian accent. Joab stated that the audition for Ajay "just turned out to be like any other audition" and the part was initially going to last for about a month, but the producers really liked him. They later decided to introduce his wife, Priya (Menik Gooneratne), to create a family unit. Joab made his first screen appearance as Ajay during the episode broadcast on 13 July 2011.

On 7 December 2011, Daniel Kilkelly from Digital Spy reported that Joab and Gooneratne would be promoted to regular cast members in early 2012. He also revealed that Coco Cherian had joined the cast as Ajay and Priya's on-screen daughter Rani. The Kapoors became the first family to be introduced to Neighbours since the Williams' arrived in 2010. The show's then executive producer, Susan Bower, stated "I'm delighted by how the Kapoors have been introduced. Viewers already know them because of their role in the community and link with other characters, and their cultural background is secondary." Bower added that having a family of Indian and Sri Lankan heritage join the neighbourhood was very exciting.

== Development ==
=== Characterisation ===
Ajay is a family man, who was raised and educated in Erinsborough. He became "an ambitious lawyer" and had a successful career in finance, but he felt a "calling" to public service. A writer for Joab's official website stated that Ajay decided "a seat on the Erinsborough council was the right place to begin a career in the community which he always felt connected to." Ajay's job as a local councillor gave him an instant role and connection to other character within the neighbourhood. Joab said Ajay was usually "a pretty positive guy" and admitted that he does everything for his family, but he forgets about being with them. Joab branded Ajay "very family-orientated" said he would not stand by for "anything which strayed from the truth." The actor thought that despite Ajay's eclectic interests, the character was quite similar to himself. When asked how he was like his character, Joab told a Channel 5 website writer that while Ajay was the better drummer, they both love their families and know how important they are. The actor wanted Ajay to be remembered for his passion and the fact that he "always lived by the truth."

=== Marriage to Priya Kapoor ===
Ajay "had" to marry Priya when they were both young because she was expecting their daughter, Rani. Gooneratne revealed "They had to be a family at an age when their peers were out having fun, then they were establishing their careers, now it's buying a house. There hasn't been a lot of down time." During an interview for Channel 5's Neighbours website, both Gooneratne and Joab agreed that Priya was the boss in the relationship as she makes all the difficult decisions. The actors also stated that the couple had "unintentionally" put their careers before their marriage, leading to cracks appearing. Joab commented that because they are busy with life, Ajay and Priya had forgotten about living in the moment. Gooneratne also stated "Priya is the one that keeps it together, and when Ajay makes decisions without her involvement, she doesn't like it."

In July 2012, Ajay purchases Number 24 Ramsay Street without consulting Priya. Joab told an Inside Soap writer that Ajay and Priya had been talking about settling down in Erinsborough for a while, but buying Number 24 was "a pretty spontaneous decision" and it was not "a wise move" for Ajay to buy a house without discussing it with his wife first. Ajay also upsets new neighbour Lucas Fitzgerald (Scott Major), who planned to buy the house. Joab explained "It was never his intention to upset Lucas - that's not Ajay's style. He sees it as an opportunity for his family to be part of the neighbourhood in which they already work." Joab added that Ajay has "a knack" of turning things around with Priya. Gooneratne later commented that Ajay and Priya had lost their way due to their lack of communication.

Ajay later notices that Priya is becoming stressed and assumes it is because her friend, Susan Kennedy (Jackie Woodburne), is demanding her support over various problems. Ajay asks Susan to give Priya some space, but Priya later opens up to him and reveals that she is unhappy in their marriage, causing him "immense hurt". Priya feels guilty about her revelation and attempts to make it up to Ajay, by throwing herself into the preparations for Diwali. Both Ajay and Rani are "thrilled" at Priya's participation and Ajay later decides to accept her apology.

=== Rivalry with Paul Robinson ===
Paul Robinson (Stefan Dennis) tries to form "an alliance" with Ajay, but his offer is rejected as Ajay is not sure what he stands to gain. Paul becomes angry with the rejection and starts looking for ways to destroy Ajay. When Paul learns that Ajay is backing a decision to merge the local police station with one in a nearby suburb, he becomes critical of the plan, believing it to be a bad idea for the community. When he learns that there is a house party nearby, Paul decides to use the event as a way to discredit Ajay. Dennis explained that Paul encourages "a load of random people" to gatecrash the party, so that it gets out of hand. He then pretends to call the police, which delays their response time and allows him to blame the merger of the two stations for the street being trashed. Dennis told an Inside Soap columnist "Paul wrote a story for the newspaper, blaming Ajay for the party getting out of hand - before anything happened on Ramsay Street." Susan Kennedy and Summer Hoyland (Jordy Lucas) discover what Paul has done and they ask him to print a retraction, but he refuses. Summer sees the damage that the situation is doing to Ajay's career and encourages Susan to reveal the truth. Paul later publishes "a hatchet article" about Ajay shortly before the local council election and Ajay "suffers a setback" when he loses his seat. When asked if he was enjoying having Ajay as Paul's new rival, he stated "Definitely - I enjoy it when Paul is toying with someone, and at the moment it's Ajay. It also provides some light relief because not all situations are high drama - Paul's pettiness can add a lot of humour to the story."

On 19 September 2012, it was revealed that Joab and Dennis had been filming a fight between their characters. A Channel 5 website writer commented that Ajay and Paul had had "a rocky relationship" since the lawyer moved into the neighbourhood, but it was the first time the men had come to blows. The actors refused to reveal who threw the first punch and why. Dennis commented "Ahh, you'll have to watch and see. However, I can say that any after-effects were applied by the make-up department, which we were both very pleased about. I think if Sachin punched me for real, I'd be back in a coma; he is a pretty fit guy!" The fight scenes between Ajay and Paul were broadcast three months later. Ajay's "world falls apart" when he learns Priya has had an affair with Paul. Joab commented "Ajay's emotions range between utter shock, heartbreak and temporary insanity." Ajay becomes furious after spotting Paul on the street and when he goes over to him, he takes an "almighty swing", leaving Paul with a black eye.

=== Departure ===
On 12 March 2013, Seanna Cronin from The Toowoomba Chronicle reported that Joab would be leaving Neighbours. The actor departed the serial after his contract ended in May, so that he could pursue new projects. Joab filmed his final scenes as Ajay on 2 May. Executive producer Richard Jasek stated that the cast and crew would miss Joab and added "The Kapoors have been at the forefront of some memorable storylines, which is testament to Sachin's talent. Like all our characters, we hope there will be opportunities for Ajay to return to Ramsay Street." During an August interview with Digital Spy's Daniel Kilkelly, Joab revealed that the Kapoor family were written out and they were "dumbfounded by the decision", especially as they did not see it coming. Joab explained "It was more of a shock to us knowing that it wasn't just one multicultural actor who was being written out, it was every single multicultural full-time actor on the show – myself, Menik Gooneratne who played Priya, Coco-Jacinta Cherian who played Rani, and Alin Sumarwata who played Vanessa. All four of us were written out in the first year of our full-time contracts, which felt like a massive step backwards in terms of cultural diversity on the show."

Joab told Kilkelly that the producers told him the reason he was being written out was a lack of storyline ideas for his character and a small budget. The actor questioned how there could be a lack of storylines for a character who had lost his wife and was raising a teenage daughter and suggested some ideas to the producers. He commented "Once Priya left, we could have explored whether Ajay would find a new love interest and how Rani would react to that. It would have also been a great opportunity to perhaps explore an interracial relationship for Ajay, which is so relevant in Australia and elsewhere. I think there was lots of potential for new stories." Joab did not rule out a return to the show and said he would come back if he was asked by the current or future production team.

Ajay made his on-screen departure with his daughter, Rani, on 12 July 2013. They left Erinsborough to take care of a sick relative in India. Joab thought the exit was "so low-key" that when it was broadcast in Australia, some viewers believed that the characters would be coming back. The actor called Ajay and Rani's departures "disappointing", but thought Priya's exit was "a great way" to write out a character. Joab also had issues with his character returning to India, since it did not make sense when Ajay had been born and raised in Australia. He tried to get the writers to send Ajay to another part of Australia, but they rejected the idea. The actor added that the writers eventually accepted his idea of Ajay and Rani visit their grandmother in India and then leaving for the UK.

== Storylines ==
Ajay assesses the local community gardens and informs Toadfish Rebecchi (Ryan Moloney) that the council have decided to sell them. A few weeks later, Toadie interrupts Ajay and Priya's anniversary dinner as he needs some legal papers signing. Ajay asks Toadie to wait, but when Toadie sends over a bottle of champagne, he agrees to sign them. Summer Hoyland confronts Ajay about whether the champagne was a bribe and Toadie insists that it was not. Susan Kennedy asks Ajay if he can reverse the council's decision to close PirateNet and he agrees to look into it. But when the local paper accuses the council of ending community radio's right to free speech, Ajay tells Susan that the station cannot be reinstated as it would look like the council are backing down due to media pressure. Paul Robinson becomes determined to stop a local shopping centre development and asks cleaner, Lorraine Dowski (Zoe Bertram), to go through Ajay's documents and photograph them. Lorraine tells Ajay about Paul's plan and Ajay warns him to stop playing games.

Ajay stands for re-election to the council and turns down Paul's offer of help with his campaign. Ajay and Paul begin a rivalry when Ajay supports the decision to turn the local police station into a community centre and have the police force merged with West Waratah. When Ajay learns that his teenage daughter, Rani, attended a house party that got out of control, he demands that there is a thorough investigation. Paul states that he had to call the police twice and blames the station merger for compromising their response time. Paul writes an article about the situation, which damages Ajay career. Shortly before he decides to announce his resignation from the council, Susan reveals to Ajay that Paul made sure the party got out of control to discredit him and the merger plans. Ajay forms a band with Karl Kennedy (Alan Fletcher) called The Right Prescription. Troy Miller (Dieter Brummer) hires Ajay to help him gain custody of Callum Jones (Morgan Baker), but Ajay quits the case after Troy holds Sonya (Eve Morey) and Jade Mitchell (Gemma Pranita) hostage.

During the filming of a music video, Ajay is caught rejecting a phone call from the Mayor and insulting him. Paul releases the clip online and damages Ajay's chances of getting re-elected. That same day, Ajay purchases 24 Ramsay Street at an auction, upsetting Priya as he did not consult her. Ajay meets with Toadie's boss Charlotte McKemmie (Meredith Penman) about a job and she offers him Toadie's promotion position. Ajay takes the job, briefly upsetting Toadie. When Ajay learns that Rani is going to a party with Harley Canning (Justin Holborow), he goes to stop her and bring her home. During an argument, Rani informs Ajay that Priya has been having an affair with Paul. Ajay does not believe Rani at first, but Priya admits that it is true and Ajay throws her out. He later punches Paul. Ajay allows Priya to move back in for Rani's sake and decides to quits his job. Rani vandalises Lassiter's Hotel with graffiti. Sergeant Matt Turner (Josef Brown) asks Ajay if he can question Rani, but Ajay refuses. Matt later informs him that Paul will not press charges and Ajay learns Priya spoke to him.

Ajay meets Phillipa Curtis (Louise Rocchi), who flirts with him. Ajay later goes home with her, but reveals to Priya that nothing happened between them. Priya asks Ajay to attend counselling with her and he initially refuses, but changes his mind. When Ajay learns that Priya is being harassed by Brian O'Loughlin (Paul Denny), he supports her and tells her he loves her. They reunite, but shortly afterwards Priya is critically injured following a gas explosion. Ajay and Rani are told that Priya will not wake up and they say their goodbyes. Ajay blames Paul for Priya's death and launches a civil action against him. When Ajay learns that the gas bottle that exploded came from faulty stock, he has to sue the gas supplier instead. Ajay notices that Rani is not coping with her mother's death and tries to help Rani her move on. When she realises that Priya did love her, she returns to her old self. Ajay approaches Toadie with the idea of them going into business together and Toadie agrees to open a practice with him.

Ajay agrees to defend Mason Turner (Taylor Glockner) when he is arrested for attempted armed robbery. Mason briefly changes lawyers when Paul offers his for free. But when Toadie realises that Paul intends to get Mason sent down, Mason switches back to Ajay and Toadie. Ajay and Toadie's next client is Caroline Perkins (Alinta Chidzey), who is suing Paul for sexual harassment. When Ajay gives Caroline her bill, she comes on to him in the hope he will lower the price. Ajay rejects her advances and the case is later settled. Ajay finally receives a cheque from the gas supplier for $350,000 as compensation for Priya's death. Ajay and Rani decide to use some of the money to go to India. However, Ajay then learns that his grandmother is terminally ill and makes the decision to leave Australia immediately to be with her. He asks Karl and Susan to take in Rani, but she refuses to remain behind without him. Ajay and Rani then leave Ramsay Street. Rani returns a couple of months later to help pack up their belongings and she explains that Ajay has got a new job in London.

== Reception ==
Following the announcement that the Kapoor family would become regular cast members, staff had to remove several racist posts left on the Neighbours website. Bower said the inappropriate comments, which were from viewers expressing their anger at a non-Anglo-Saxon family being introduced to the show, came from a "small minority". She later commented that for every negative comment about the family there were ten to fifteen positive ones. Joab spoke out about the issue, blaming the racism on a "lack of education". He stated "There is various pockets that will say it is un-Australian to have an Indian or an Indian family on Ramsay St. Those Aussies who are saying it is un-Australian will be the same ones who pretty much supported the White Australia policy back in the day, you are never going to get away from that kind of stuff." Joab added having a show, which portrays different families coming together could only be a good thing for the community. He later revealed that despite the few negative views, the audience reaction to the Kapoors had been "fantastic".

A writer for What's on TV called Ajay and Priya a "power couple". The Herald Sun's Cameron Adams branded Ajay "Paul's latest nemesis", while a Sunday Mercury reporter wondered if Paul had underestimated him. Another Sunday Mercury reporter thought Ajay had suffered "a crushing blow" during election day, before incurring the wrath of his wife for buying Number 24. Dianne Butler, writing for news.com.au, stated that "maybe Ajay does have a future in politics" when he forced how-to-vote cards on people while they were eating lunch. She added that "nothing could be more career-limiting" when Ajay agreed to shoot a video to help his campaign with Karl.

Butler later stated that she did not blame Priya for flirting with Paul as "her husband's a clown." In November 2012, Butler called Ajay "deluded". A Liverpool Echo reporter called Ajay a "nice-but-boring dad". A writer for the Sunday Mail thought Ajay was "suffering as a result of Priya's death".
