= Sandy Winton =

Australian actor (born 1970)

- Born: 18 December 1970 (age 55); Australia
- Education: Newington College; NIDA
- Occupation: Actor
- Years active: 1996–present
- Spouse: Tessa Winton
- Children: 2

Alexander Gordon Winton (born 18 December 1970) is an Australian actor, known for his roles as Bruce in children's television series The Genie from Down Under and Michael Williams in the soap opera Neighbours from 2010 until 2012.

== Career ==
Winton attended Newington College (1983–1988) and graduated from Australia's National Institute of Dramatic Art (NIDA) with a Bachelor of Dramatic Art (Acting) in 1995. The following year, he appeared in an episode of Police Rescue, which marked his first screen role.

In 1998, Winton took over the main role of Bruce for the second series of the children's television comedy The Genie from Down Under. That same year, he guested in an episode of All Saints as cancer patient Greg. In 2000, Winton starred opposite Rachel Griffiths in the feature film Me Myself I.

In 2001, Winton appeared in the British television series Cold Feet after they filmed scenes in Australia. Winton played the guest role of Rex Avent in Home and Away in 2009. He also filmed a role in the American war drama miniseries The Pacific. Winton admitted to being "star-struck" upon meeting Tom Hanks who produced the series.

In March 2010, it was announced that Winton had joined the cast of Neighbours as new series regular Michael Williams. The character was introduced as the new principal of the local high school. He was also a single father raising a teenage daughter Natasha Williams (Valentina Novakovic). Winton admitted to sharing some similarities with his character, such as their love of the beach and surfing. On 7 November 2011, it was announced Winton would be leaving Neighbours the following year. Of Winton's departure, executive producer Susan Bower said "The Michael Williams character will be leaving Ramsay Street as part of a significant story coming up in April. Sandy's contribution to the show has been superb, enabling the character to be part of some milestone storylines."

== Personal life ==
Winton is married and has two children. Upon landing the role of Michael Williams in Neighbours, Winton relocated to Melbourne from his home in Sydney for filming. He is a supporter of AFL team, Sydney Swans.

== Filmography ==
=== Film ===
Year	Title	Role	Notes
1997	Oscar and Lucinda	Expeditioner	
1999	Me Myself I	Ben Monroe	
2005	Son of the Mask	Chris	
2006	Candy	Candy's Doctor	
2014	Unbroken	Coach	
2018	Sink	Father	Completed
2018	Fragmentary	Glenn Sanderson	

=== Television ===
Year	Title	Role	Notes
1996	Police Rescue	Senior Constable	Episode: "The Only Constant"
1996	Twisted		Episode: "A Sure Thing"
1997	Big Sky	Richard / Rob	Episode: "Sweet Revenge"
1997	The Devil Game	Steve	TV film
1998	All Saints	Greg Newman	Episode: "Night Shift"
1998	Good Guys, Bad Guys	Walter McLeod	Episode: "Blood Is Thicker Than Walter"
1998	Wildside	Doug Zelka	Episode: "1.31"
1998	The Genie from Down Under	Bruce	Main role (series 2)
1999	Murder Call	Peter Sharp	Episode: "Hide & Seek"
2000	Above the Law	Zac Wernholdt	Episodes: "Snapshots and Cottontails", "Send in the Clowns", "Chaos Theory"
2000	Dogwoman: Dead Dog Walking	Jeremy Maitland	TV film
2000	Something in the Air	Matt Bateman	Recurring role
2001	Xena: Warrior Princess	Prince Morloch	Episode: "Dangerous Prey"
2001	BeastMaster	Navas	Episode: "Mate for Life"
2001	Farscape	Rinic Tolven	Episode: "Thanks for Sharing"
2001	The Secret Life of Us	Vincent	Episodes: "The Unbelievable Truth", "Expect the Unexpected"
2001	Cold Feet	Shawn	Episode: "4.8"
2002	The Lost World	Thomas Duckart	Episode: "Phantoms"
2002	Counterstrike	Hart	TV film
2002	White Collar Blue	Simon	TV film
2002	McLeod's Daughters	Daniel Lewis	Season 2, Episode 13: "Steer Trek"
2002	Young Lions	Capt. Ian Martin	Episodes: "The Navy: Parts 1 & 2", "Bill's Death"
2003	White Collar Blue	Simon Ball	Guest role (series 1–2)
2004	The Alice	Nicky Marione	TV film
2006	Fatal Contact: Bird Flu in America	Little League Father	TV film
2006	Two Twisted	Bill Banks	Episode: "There's Something About Kyanna"
2006	Tripping Over	Daniel	Episodes: "1.3", "1.4", "1.5"
2007	McLeod's Daughters	Heath Barrett	Recurring (Season 7)
2009	Home and Away	Rex Avent	Guest role (Season 22)
2010	The Pacific	Capt. Jameson	Episode: "Guadalcanal/Leckie"
2010–2012	Neighbours	Michael Williams	Regular role (Seasons 26–28)
2012	Tricky Business	Marcus Woodward	Recurring role
2014	INXS: Never Tear Us Apart	Det. Chambers	TV miniseries
2015	Wonderland	Liam	Recurring role (series 3)
2016	The Code	Michael McCray	Episodes: "2.1", "2.2", "2.3"
2021	Harrow	Ian Vanderhuust	1 episode
2022	Barons	Bernie Hunter Snr	5 episodes
