= List of Neighbours characters introduced in 2013 =

Neighbours is an Australian television soap opera. It was first broadcast on 18 March 1985 and currently airs on digital channel Eleven. The following is a list of characters that first appeared in the soap in 2013, by order of first appearance. All characters are introduced by the shows executive producer Richard Jasek. The 29th season of Neighbours began airing from 7 January 2013. Nell Rebecchi made her debut in the same month. The Turner family, consisting of Amber, Bailey, Matt and Mason arrived in February, as did Robbo Slade. Rhiannon Bates began appearing from April. Jayden Warley and the Willises – Terese, Imogen and Joshua Willis – made their first appearances in May. The following month saw Walter Mitchell and Hudson Walsh arrive. Marty Kranic and Josie Lamb made their debuts in July and August respectively. Alek Pocoli began appearing in September, while October saw the introductions of Gemma Reeves and Eric Edwards.

== Nell Rebecchi ==
Nell Rebecchi
- Neighbours character
- Portrayed by: Scarlett Anderson (2013–2022); Ayisha Salem-Towner (2023–2025)
- Duration: 2013–2025
- First appearance: 7 January 2013
- Last appearance: 11 December 2025
- Introduced by: Richard Jasek
In-universe information
- Occupation: Student
- Father: Toadie Rebecchi
- Mother: Sonya Rebecchi
- Stepmother: Melanie Pearson; Terese Willis
- Half-brothers: Callum Rebecchi; Hugo Somers
- Grandfathers: Walter Mitchell; Kevin Rebecchi
- Grandmothers: Angie Rebecchi
- Uncles: Shane Rebecchi; Stonefish Rebecchi
- Aunts: Jade Mitchell; Zoe Mitchell
- First cousins: Yashvi Rebecchi; Kirsha Rebecchi; Jay Rebecchi
- Other relatives: Georgia Brooks; Gemma Reeves; Rhonda Brooks

Nell Rebecchi, played by Scarlett Anderson until 2022 and by Ayisha Salem-Towner from 2023, made her first screen appearance during the episode broadcast on 7 January 2013. She is the daughter of Sonya (Eve Morey) and Toadfish Rebecchi (Ryan Moloney). Anderson was just four weeks old when she made her debut as Nell. Morey revealed that she instantly fell in love with her and joked that she had trouble letting her go after filming. She said "I just want her there all the time! I come home all excited about how I've been able to work with the baby. She's called Scarlett in real life and she's such a beautiful baby. Having her around just lifts everyone's mood, so we're very lucky."

Morey believed that she "wore down the writers" to give Sonya and Toadie a baby. She commented "After everything they have been through, it just seems like the most natural thing for these characters." Morey's character was pregnant at the same time as Vanessa Villante (Alin Sumarwata), which allowed the two women to share their experiences. Both actresses were required to wear prosthetic bumps, which would be increased in size every few weeks. Morey stated that she became attached to hers and would constantly rub it. On-screen, Sonya opts to give birth at home, but experiences serious complications and has to undergo a caesarean section at the hospital. Toadie and Callum Jones (Morgan Baker) are left "to frantically wait for news" and when Karl Kennedy (Alan Fletcher) cannot confirm the health of the baby, Toadie assumes that his daughter has died. A Soap World reporter said "Toadie is in agony until Karl finally reports that little Nell is healthy and happy. The new father joins a recovering Sonya and Callum to celebrate the newest addition to the family". Anderson's final appearance as Nell was on 28 July 2022 during the serial's finale.

Ayisha Salem-Towner took over the role of Nell when Neighbours returned in 2023, with the series' narrative moving forward two years from the finale. Moloney teased Nell's increased role in storylines with Salem-Towner in the role, describing her as "pretty phenomenal". He also noted that, unlike Salem-Towner, Anderson's casting from birth meant that she had not chosen to be an actor and could now enjoy her childhood. Upon the character's return, Nell is aged up.

When Sonya and Toadie decide to have a baby, they initially struggle to conceive and Toadie learns he has a low sperm count. The couple think about putting their plans on hold. When Sonya goes to the hospital to give blood, Rhys Lawson (Ben Barber) asks her to take a pregnancy test. Believing the test is negative, Sonya throws it away, but Rhys retrieves it and reveals that the test is positive. Following the first ultrasound scan, Sonya and Toadie argue about whose surname the baby will take and ultimately choose Rebecchi. After learning that they are having a girl, Sonya finds a photo of Nell Mangel and decides to give the name to her daughter. Sonya chooses to have a home birth and goes into labour two weeks early. When a complication arises, she is taken to the hospital and gives birth to Nell via caesarean section. Nell stays in the hospital for a couple of days with Sonya, before she goes home with her family. Sonya and Toadie later throw Nell a naming day ceremony, where she gets to meet her grandmother Angie (Lesley Baker). During his campaign to intimidate Sonya, Robbo Slade (Aaron Jakubenko) moves Nell's pram when she is looking away. Sheila Canning (Colette Mann) brings Nell back to Sonya, explaining that her pram was around the corner.

When Toadie and Sonya realise that Nell has become too reliant on technology to keep her entertained, they go through a 24-hour digital detox. A few weeks later, Nell suffers a fall at the local park when Sonya is briefly distracted. A DHS worker investigates the incident when a formal complaint is made against Sonya. The following year, Nell is stung by a bee and rushed to hospital, as she suffers a mild reaction to the sting. Georgia Brooks (Saskia Hampele) becomes distracted and almost gives Nell an overdose of paracetamol, but Sonya stops her in time. Nell begins biting people and Sonya and Toadie struggle to work out the cause of the issue. While babysitting Nell, Amber Turner (Jenna Rosenow) discovers that she is being influenced by a phone app. When Toadie is left paralysed after an accident, Nell becomes afraid of his wheelchair. Amy Williams (Zoe Cramond) helps out by dressing Toadie up as a spaceman and his wheelchair as a rocket to turn it into a game, which relaxes Nell. Sonya leaves Nell with Toadie, while she goes shopping, but he is unable to chase after Nell when she runs out the front door and into the driveway. Tyler Brennan (Travis Burns) stops Sonya from hitting Nell with her car. Sonya and Toadie separate, with Nell living at Sonya's, but having regular contact with her father. She grows close to family friend Mark Brennan (Scott McGregor), much to Toadie's jealousy. Nell swallows some medication she finds at the Kennedy household, resulting in an opiate overdose. She is rushed to the hospital, where she is stabilised.

Sonya and Toadie separate, and he moves out. Nell's kindergarten teacher tells Toadie and Sonya that Nell has been misbehaving, and she suggests that Nell be held back from starting school, leading Toadie to contact a child psychologist. Toadie eventually moves back into the family home after reconciling with Sonya. Nell meets her younger brother Hugo Somers (John Turner), born from a one-night stand between Toadie and Andrea Somers (Madeleine West). The following year, Sonya is diagnosed with stage four ovarian cancer and she decides not to tell Nell, who is starting school. Sonya's health rapidly declines and she dies, leaving Toadie as a single parent to Nell and Hugo. When Nell discovers that her uncle and aunt, Shane (Nicholas Coghlan) and Dipi Rebecchi (Sharon Johal), are moving to Sydney, she tells Dipi that she doesn’t want her to leave her like Sonya did. After talking to Toadie and Dipi by Sonya’s mural, Nell eventually accepts the fact that Shane and Dipi are leaving and accompany others in sending them off.

Later, Nell begins to get confused when she sees Amy Greenwood (Jacinta Stapleton) dating both Ned Willis (Ben Hall) and Levi Canning (Richie Morris) at the same time. After asking Toadie a lot of questions, she draws a picture of Amy holding hands with both Ned and Levi, which causes Toadie to confront Amy. Nell, Hugo, Toadie and Rose Walker (Lucy Durack) later go on a Father's Day picnic. After seeing Toadie's ex-girlfriend, Melanie Pearson (Lucinda Cowden), Nell asks if Melanie can play with her and go to the zoo. Rose says that she can take Nell to the zoo, but Nell says Melanie is more fun. Melanie later takes Nell and Hugo give Father's Day presents to Toadie, causing Toadie and Melanie to reunite. Nell asks Melanie to speak with her mother through her crystal ball, and Melanie tells Nell that Sonya likes her dress. Nell becomes obsessed with the notion that her mother can talk to her through the crystal ball. She is upset when Toadie accidentally breaks it and refuses to believe him when he says it is fake. Toadie and Melanie talk to Nell about keeping Sonya's memory alive by talking to her and she admits that she knew the crystal ball was not real, she just liked pretending. The following month, Nell is given an alcoholic jelly shot that was spiked by Zara Selwyn (Freya Van Dyke), but Karl tells Toadie that she will be fine. Nell goes to Toadie and Melanie's wedding a few months later and goes to their reception on Ramsay Street, where she plays cricket with her siblings and befriends Annie Robinson-Pappas (Harlow Ireland).

Following Toadie's wedding to Terese Willis (Rebekah Elmaloglou), Nell tells Hugo that she is opposed to their marriage and believes that Toadie is better suited to Melanie. Nell begins planting reminders of Melanie and Terese's ex-husband, Paul Robinson (Stefan Dennis), around the house. When she is out, Hugo snoops in her bag and picks up one of Melanie's china pigs. When Terese catches him, she confronts Nell, who says that her and Toadie are in denial about still loving Melanie and Paul. After hearing that Melanie's close friend Sharon Davies (Jessica Muschamp) is in town, she meets up with her, who gives Nell Melanie's address. When she goes to Melanie's house, she goes through the door and is knocked out by Eden Shaw (Costa D'Angelo), who had broken into her home. Melanie later finds her and returns her to Ramsay Street.

Nell returned in the final episodes of the show, for Paul and Terese wedding and tour around Ramsey Hills and Robinson Towers alongside former and current residents.

== Amber Turner ==
Amber Turner, played by Jenna Rosenow, made her first screen appearance on 7 February 2013. The character and Rosenow's casting was announced on 4 November 2012. The actress previously appeared in Neighbours as an extra. Of her casting, Rosenow revealed "It's very exciting. I auditioned for the role and got short-listed and had a call back, then was told I got the role." Amber is Matt (Josef Brown) and Lauren Turner's (Kate Kendall) only daughter. Kendall described her as "the typical teenage girl", while Rosenow called her "a regular 17-year-old." The actress went on to reveal that Amber is a little naive and was keeping a secret from her family. Rosenow commented "She seems like the perfect good girl, but she may not be." An online spin-off called Amber's Blog, which features Amber documenting her family's move from Mount Isa to Erinsborough.

== Bailey Turner ==
Bailey Turner, played by Calen Mackenzie, made his first screen appearance on 7 February 2013. The character and casting was announced on 4 November 2012. Mackenzie previously appeared in Neighbours as Thomas McPhee. Mackenzie successfully auditioned for the role of Bailey and was initially contracted for four years. Mackenzie commented "to be a part of something which has been going since before you were born and such a huge part of this collective consciousness is really amazing." Bailey is the youngest child of Matt Turner (Josef Brown) and Lauren Carpenter (Kate Kendall). Kendall stated that Bailey is "a brain". A writer for the show's official website stated "Cheeky, left-of-centre and inquisitive, Bailey Turner is one switched on teen. A self described nerd, Bailey loves flexing his brain muscles and has a unique take on everything."

== Matt Turner ==
Matt Turner, played by Josef Brown, made his first screen appearance on 7 February 2013. The character and casting was announced on 4 November 2012. On 13 November, Brown revealed that he had been filming in Melbourne for four weeks and was enjoying playing his character. Matt is Lauren Carpenter's (Kate Kendall) husband and the father of their three children; Mason (Taylor Glockner), Amber (Jenna Rosenow) and Bailey (Calen Mackenzie). Matt and his family arrive in Erinsborough from Mount Isa and he became the town's "newly appointed" police sergeant. Of the family, Brown commented "It's a great family and a little bit different. We've got a few secrets and a few dramas up our sleeves."

== Robbo Slade ==
Robbo Slade
- Neighbours character
- Portrayed by: Aaron Jakubenko
- First appearance: 15 February 2013
- Last appearance: 18 September 2013
- Introduced by: Richard Jasek
- Spin-off appearances: Neighbours vs Zombies (2014)
In-universe information
- Mother: Florence

Robert Alan "Robbo" Slade, played by Aaron Jakubenko, made his first screen appearance on 15 February 2013. Jakubenko previously appeared in Neighbours as two other characters; Rhys Sutton in 2009 and Brad Bain in 2011. Robbo is Mason Turner's (Taylor Glockner) friend from Mount Isa. Robbo came up with a plan for him and Mason to rob a factory, but it went wrong and Mason was arrested by his father, Matt (Josef Brown). Robbo came to Erinsborough and broke into Number 32, the home of the Turner family. He later lied to Mason about having just flown into town when they met up. Mason tried to convince Robbo to leave town, but Robbo made it clear that he was not going anywhere and it was soon revealed that he was Amber Turner's (Jenna Rosenow) secret boyfriend. When asked if Robbo was bad news, Rosenow commented "He is the bad boy of Mt Isa and that's what attracted Amber to him, the bad boy charm. He's very deceiving. To her face he's all charm and love, but he's the complete opposite behind her back." On 13 May 2013, Daniel Kilkelly from Digital Spy reported that Jakubenko had returned to filming, after pictures of him on set were released on the show's Facebook page. The actor returned on-screen as Robbo on 17 July. Dianne Butler from The Daily Telegraph branded Robbo "slippery". She later called him "hot, bad Robbo from Mt Isa."

Robbo breaks into Number 32 Ramsay Street and ransacks the house. Lou Carpenter (Tom Oliver) comes face to face with Robbo, who pushes him to the ground and makes his escape. Mason Turner later calls Robbo to check in with him and it is revealed that Robbo is still in Erinsborough. Mason later meets up with Robbo and tells him that he will get him his money from the robbery soon. Robbo then meets with his girlfriend Mason's sister, Amber, revealing that they are a couple. Robbo persuades Mason to take part in another robbery at Lassiter's to pay him back. However, due to a wedding reception being held on the same day, the hotel is full of extra security and Robbo and Mason are forced to leave without taking anything. Outside, Robbo takes off his balaclava and he and Mason are spotted by Sonya Mitchell (Eve Morey). Knowing that Sonya could identify him, Robbo quickly leaves Erinsborough.

A few months later, Robbo returns to Erinsborough. He runs into Amber and asks her to listen to his explanation of why he committed the robberies. Robbo is soon arrested and bailed, only for his mother to pay this off. He goes to see Mason and tells him that he knows Mason told the police about him. Robbo asks Amber for her support, but she tells him to leave her alone. Mason hits Robbo when he makes a comment about Amber. Robbo decides not to report Mason for breaking his good behavior bond. Matt warns Robbo to stay away from his family. Robbo later makes threats towards Sonya, which infuriate her husband Toadfish Rebecchi (Ryan Moloney). Robbo intimidates Amber's date, Clay (Charles Terrier), into giving him Amber's phone, which she left in Clay's car. He also tells Josh Willis (Harley Bonner) to leave her alone. Robbo continues to intimidate Sonya and later takes her infant daughter, which Sonya cannot prove. Robbo tries to apply for a job at Charlie's, only for Sheila Canning (Colette Mann) to dismiss him. Overhearing this conversation, Paul Robinson (Stefan Dennis) invites Robbo to his penthouse so he can gain information on Mason. While he is there, Paul invites Robbo to take part in a rigged poker game, forcing him into debt. Paul tells Robbo that he will forget the debt if Robbo forgets the money Mason owes him. Feeling dejected Robbo continues to pursue Amber and when she comes to see him soon after, they have sex. Robbo records it and then blackmails Mason with the footage. Robbo begins hosting poker games and Lucas Fitzgerald (Scott Major) gets into debt with him. Robbo threatens to post the video of Amber on the internet, unless Mason gives him the money. Robbo threatens Sonya again, and secretly spikes her drink; however, it is Toadie that drinks it. Robbo is later involved in a hit and run accident, leaving him in a serious condition in hospital. When he wakes up, Robbo tries to tell Georgia Brooks (Saskia Hampele) something about Mason. He then goes into cardiac arrest and dies. Hudson Walsh (Remy Hii) later confesses to hitting Robbo with the car.

== Mason Turner ==
Mason Turner, played by Taylor Glockner, made his first screen appearance on 22 February 2013. Glockner's casting was announced on 4 November 2012. During his first television interview, the actor revealed that he had been filming with the show for about five or six weeks before the annual production break in December. He shot his first scenes alongside Ashleigh Brewer. Mason is the eldest of Lauren (Kate Kendall) and Matt Turner's (Josef Brown) three children. Kendall described him as "the smouldering, rebellious" child, while executive producer, Richard Jasek, commented that Mason is "a bad boy", who has a good heart. However, he has done the wrong things for the right reasons. Glockner explained that Mason would give his sister, Amber (Jenna Rosenow), "a lot of stick", as well as revealing that he has "a few issues" with his father. Mason arrived after his family due to being in juvenile detention on a robbery conviction. He was "innocently caught up in the crime." Following his arrival, Mason begins "incessantly flirting" with Kate Ramsay (Brewer).

== Rhiannon Bates ==
Rhiannon Bates
- Neighbours character
- Portrayed by: Teressa Liane
- First appearance: 8 April 2013
- Last appearance: 21 November 2013
- Introduced by: Richard Jasek
In-universe information
- Occupation: Hotel staff
- Sons: Jackson Bates

Rhiannon Bates, played by Teressa Liane, made her first screen appearance on 8 April 2013. Liane had to undergo a transformation to achieve Rhiannon's "distinctive look". Her blonde hair was dyed brunette, she had hair extensions put in and "showy" make-up applied. Liane said "When I first started and would be waiting around for make-up, I did have cast looking at me very cautiously, wondering who is this person who's taken up residence in the green room. It was even funnier when I had worked with them the day prior." Rhiannon is Mason Turner's (Taylor Glockner) ex-girlfriend from Mount Isa. Liane described her as being "completely out there", not shy and someone who quickly makes "an unforgettable impression". The actress added that she had had fun playing Rhiannon, especially because she is cheeky and direct. Rhiannon travels from Mount Isa to Erinsborough to see Mason and makes "a spectacular entrance" when she climbs through his bedroom window. Glockner told Thomas Mitchell from TV Week Rhiannon has perfect timing, as he is just starting to get somewhere with Kate Ramsay (Ashleigh Brewer). Mason later kisses Rhiannon to get information out of her and Kate sees them together. On 29 July 2013, it was confirmed that Liane would be returning to Neighbours to film more scenes as Rhiannon. A shows spokesperson commented "As one of our recurring guest characters, Rhiannon will pop in and out of the show." Rhiannon returned on 16 October 2013.

Rhiannon comes to Erinsborough to surprise her ex-boyfriend Mason. She tells him that she wants to pick up where they left off back in Mount Isa, but Mason appears reluctant. He asks about her son, Jackson (Finn Woodlock), and Rhiannon tells him that she left him with her sister back home. Mason's sister, Amber (Jenna Rosenow), asks Rhiannon about Robbo Slade (Aaron Jakubenko) and Rhiannon reveals that he tried it on with her, but she rejected him. When Amber gets upset, Rhiannon believes it is because she is worried about her cheating on Mason. Rhiannon is disappointed when Mason tells her that he is not returning to Mount Isa with her. Rhiannon then decides to stay in Erinsborough and moves into Number 26 Ramsay Street. Mason kisses Rhiannon to get information about Robbo, but then tells her that he is not interested in a relationship with her. Rhiannon later confesses to sending a threatening note to Mason's father, Matt (Josef Brown), as she did not like the way Matt treated Mason.

Mason tells Rhiannon to go home to her son, but she reveals that she used all of her money on rent. She later realises that Mason is interested in Kate Ramsay. When Paul Robinson (Stefan Dennis) insults her, Rhiannon becomes upset and Sheila Canning (Colette Mann) gives her some advice about changing her image. A vengeful Rhiannon uses her new image to seduce Paul and leaves him handcuffed to a bed at Lassiter's. When Rhiannon reveals that she is broke, Sheila advises her to get a job and she has a word with Paul on Rhiannon's behalf. Paul offers Rhiannon $500 to go to dinner with him and Allan Hewitt (Mick Preston), a councillor who he needs on his side to build some apartments. Rhiannon is uncomfortable when she realises that Allan wants to have sex with her and she quickly leaves. Rhiannon tells Sheila that she misses her son, but does not feel like a good mother. Rhiannon decides to go back to Mount Isa. Before she goes, she tells Paul that she has reported him to the police for bribing Allan.

A few months later, Rhiannon returns to Erinsborough to help Matt in the corruption case against Paul. Rhiannon agrees to withdraw her statement in return for a job at Lassiter's. Rhiannon brings her son Jackson to Erinsborough and they begin staying with Karl (Alan Fletcher) and Susan Kennedy (Jackie Woodburne) at Number 28. Rhiannon tries to convince Mason to have a casual relationship. She is unhappy when she is given a job with the cleaning team at Lassiter's and learns that it is because she does not speak well enough to be placed on the front desk. Rhiannon asks Susan to teach her to speak properly and she agrees. Rhiannon wants to move in with Mason, but when Mason refuses she leaves to take a job at Lassiter's in Darwin.

Laura-Jayne Tyler of Inside Soap said that Rhiannon was like an Australian version of a female McQueen from the British soap opera Hollyoaks. Claire Crick from All About Soap branded her "racy Rhiannon". A TV Magazine columnist opined that Rhiannon "smartened up her act" following Paul's insults and added that her make over left him "dribbling over her like a baby in a milk aisle".

== Jayden Warley ==
Jayden Warley
- Neighbours character
- Portrayed by: Khan Oxenham
- Duration: 2013–2015, 2018
- First appearance: 6 May 2013
- Last appearance: 22 March 2018
- Introduced by: Richard Jasek (2013); Jason Herbison (2018)
In-universe information
- Occupation: Student; Builder's assistant
- Father: Bill Warley
- Mother: Sue Parker

Jayden Warley, played by Khan Oxenham, made his first screen appearance on 6 May 2013. Oxenham's casting was announced on 2 February 2013. In April 2015, Channel 5 reported that Oxenham had returned to play Jayden once more. Oxenham said that he enjoyed playing Jayden, as the role was challenging and made him step outside of his comfort zone. He also said that he and Jayden shared some similarities, such as their lack of motivation during maths and science lessons. Oxenham added, "while he is a very confused guy and I do empathise with him, I don't want him to change, he is great to play." Jayden returned on 8 February 2018.

Jayden bullies Bailey Turner (Calen Mackenzie). When Bailey grabs Jayden's lapels, Jayden pushes him away, causing Bailey to hit his face on a locker. Jayden tells Kate Ramsay (Ashleigh Brewer) that Bailey hit him. Jayden is given Callum Jones's (Morgan Baker) role in the school play and after Callum trashes the sets, Jayden taunts him. Bailey tells Josie Mackay (Kate Mylius) that Jayden has been bragging about the things they did while they were together, and she confronts him. Jayden takes his anger out on Bailey and arranges a fight. However, Bailey gives Jayden and his friends alcohol to stop the fight. Bailey later invites Jayden and his friends to his house to drink. Jayden leaves when he and Bailey argue over Josie. Jayden continues to bully Bailey and he gets into a fight with Ben Fitzgerald (Felix Mallard). He avoids getting suspended by blackmailing Bailey into saying Ben started the fight. Jayden buys Josh Willis's (Harley Bonner) skateboard and injures himself trying to copy one of Josh's tricks. His mother, Sue Parker (Kate Gorman) threatens to sue Josh, but is talked out of it.

Jayden trashes Sonya's Nursery when he learns Paul Robinson (Stefan Dennis) intends to hold a press conference there to announce his intentions of becoming mayor again. Paul forces a confession from Jayden and tells Sue that he will not press charges if she steps down as interim mayor. Jayden continues to bully Bailey and Brad Willis (Kip Gamblin) breaks up a fight between them. Jayden admits to Brad that his parents are fighting, and Brad encourages him to use his anger on the football field instead. Jayden and Bailey later spend time together getting drunk and vandalising the Erinsborough memorial wall. When Jayden mentions Bailey's recently deceased father, Bailey lashes out at him and Jayden leaves. Bailey later calls Jayden and apologises, inviting him over to his place. The two of them get drunk and Jayden discovers Matt's (Josef Brown) police I.D. which Jayden and Bailey use to pull over some cars. A few weeks later Paige Smith (Olympia Valance) accuses Jayden of stealing some money from a bag she threw down a well, but he denies it and proves that the piece of broken keyring she found is not his. After spotting Paige and Tyler Brennan (Travis Burns) exchanging money, Jayden tries to blackmail Paige into having sex with him. She arranges a date at the Men's Shed and makes Jayden eat strawberries laced with laxatives. When he goes outside to relieve himself, Paige films him and counter blackmails him into keeping quiet about what he saw. After learning Paige is in trouble with the police, Jayden taunts and insults her. Following a fire at the school, Jayden's fingerprints are found on a Fitzgerald Motors jerry can. He explains that he tried to set Stephanie Scully (Carla Bonner) up, as he believed he had accidentally started the fire by smoking in the principal's office. He later tells Steph what he did and apologises.

Three years later, Jayden has a job interview with Amy Williams (Zoe Cramond), which proves difficult going, but she gives him a trial at the builder's yard when he admits that he has struggled to find a job. Jayden proves to be a very poor worker and Amy is hard on him, hoping that he will quit, but she ends up with a workplace bullying warning. Jayden is later caught working without a hard hat during an inspection. Amy struggles to tell Jayden that he is fired, but he realises what she is trying to do and goes to collect his belongings. Amy then offers him an apprenticeship, which he accepts. Amy also develops a crush on Jayden. Leo Tanaka (Tim Kano) is injured by some falling concrete slabs and Jayden tells Rafael Humphreys (Ryan Thomas) that his mother asked him to loosen the ratchet straps on the truck carrying the slabs. Sue and Jayden are questioned by the police and they later receive a six-month prison sentence each.

== Terese Willis ==
Terese Willis, played by Rebekah Elmaloglou, made her first screen appearance on 14 May 2013. The character and Elmaloglou's casting was announced on 7 February 2013. The actress and her family relocated to Melbourne to be closer to the set. Shortly before she began filming her first scenes, Elmaloglou had to ask the producers to change the pronunciation of her character's name. Terese was introduced as the second wife of Brad Willis (Kip Gamblin). The couple were joined by their teenage twins; Josh (Harley Bonner) and Imogen (Ariel Kaplan). Elmaloglou thought Terese was the kind of person she would be friends with and thought they were similar in terms of how organised they both were. Terese first comes to Erinsborough to meet with Paul Robinson (Stefan Dennis), who believes he is interviewing her for a job at Lassiter's Hotel.

== Imogen Willis ==
Imogen Willis, played by Ariel Kaplan, made her first screen appearance on 20 May 2013. The character was announced on 7 February 2013, while Kaplan's casting was revealed on 18 February. Kaplan was studying at the 16th Street Actors Studio in Melbourne in 2012 when she was offered the role of Imogen. Imogen is Joshua's (Harley Bonner) twin sister and the teenage daughter of Brad (Kip Gamblin) and Terese Willis (Rebekah Elmaloglou). Kaplan commented "I love the character, she is outwardly confident and very comfortable in her own skin, and doesn't feel she has to impress anyone by doing things she might regret. I think she is a great role model for young girls." Imogen often feels sidelined by her family and resents things being organised around Joshua's potential swimming career. While Bonner commented that Joshua and Imogen have a love-hate relationship.

== Josh Willis ==
Joshua "Josh" Willis, played by Harley Bonner, made his first screen appearance on 20 May 2013. The character was announced on 7 February 2013, while Bonner's casting was revealed on 18 February. The actor was persuaded to attend the audition for the role by his agent. Bonner said that he was nervous on his first day on set because he and his on-screen family had only just met and had to pretend to be a family unit straight away. Josh is the teenage son of Brad (Kip Gamblin) and Terese Willis (Rebekah Elmaloglou). Bonner stated that Josh is driven and does not let anything get in his way. He gets on well with his parents, but has a love-hate relationship with his twin sister Imogen (Ariel Kaplan). Josh was also an elite swimmer, which means Bonner had to embrace his character's hobby and spend a lot of time in a local pool during filming.

== Walter Mitchell ==
Walter Mitchell
- Neighbours character
- Portrayed by: Chris Haywood
- First appearance: 17 June 2013
- Last appearance: 10 July 2013
- Introduced by: Richard Jasek
In-universe information
- Other names: Dave

Walter Mitchell (also Dave), played by Chris Haywood, made his first appearance on 17 June 2013. The character was announced on 5 June, while Haywood's casting was revealed on 14 June. A promotional trailer was released for the character's arrival on 8 June.

Walter was reported to be the long-lost uncle of Sonya Mitchell (Eve Morey), who she had presumed had died. Walter initially watches Sonya from afar and follows her every move, until she confronts him and he reveals that he is uncle. A writer for TV Soap explained that Sonya soon embraces Walter's stories and photos of her childhood. However, Sonya's partner, Toadfish Rebecchi (Ryan Moloney), urges her to "tread carefully" as he worries that she could get hurt. While Walter gives Sonya advice on how to deal with her son Callum (Morgan Baker), he is not very forthcoming on details about himself. Daniel Kilkelly from Digital Spy added that one of the local Ramsay Street residents would become "smitten" with Walter.

Upon arriving in Erinsborough, Walter goes to the local bar, Charlie's, and meets Sheila Canning (Colette Mann). He tells Sheila that has come to see someone that may live locally. He then watches Sonya Mitchell at Harold's Store, before bumping into her briefly at her garden nursery. Sheila invites Walter to a neighbourhood dinner and he meets Sonya again. Walter then admits to Sonya that he is her uncle and they begin to reconnect. Walter also meets her infant daughter, Nell (Scarlett Anderson) and her son, Callum (Morgan Baker). When Sonya invites Walter to lunch, her partner, Toadie, makes him feel uncomfortable and he leaves early. Knowing that Susan Kennedy (Jackie Woodburne) is at the lunch, Walter goes to her house and steals a watch, which he pawns. Toadie apologises to Walter and asks him to stay around. While Toadie is out of the room, Walter steals some money and takes the keys to the Men's Shed. Ajay Kapoor (Sachin Joab) finds him and Walter explains that he is looking for somewhere to sleep. Toadie then invites Walter to stay with him and Sonya.

When Sonya contacts her aunt, she learns that Walter has lied to her and that he is an alcoholic. Sonya fears that he has fallen off the wagon and when Lucas Fitzgerald (Scott Major) finds Walter getting drunk, she encourages him to attend an AA meeting. Sheila flirts with Walter and he steals her bank card, but finds himself unable to go through with taking her money. While he is in Charlie's, a man greets Walter by his real name Dave. After attending an AA meeting with Sonya, Toadie finds Walter getting drunk in the Men's Shed. Walter asks him to keep it between them. He later steals the proceeds from Sonya's nursery, packs his bags and decides to leave town. Kyle Canning (Chris Milligan) sees Walter and begs him not to leave, concerned for both Sonya and his grandmother. Walter later returns to give Sonya the money back. He then explains that his name is actually Dave and that he met the real Walter Mitchell (Greg Stone) at a half-way house, where they swapped stories about their lives. Dave then goes to see Sheila, before leaving.

== Hudson Walsh ==
Hudson Walsh
- Neighbours character
- Portrayed by: Remy Hii
- Duration: 2013–2014
- First appearance: 28 June 2013
- Last appearance: 1 May 2014
- Introduced by: Richard Jasek
In-universe information
- Occupation: Competitive swimmer

Hudson Walsh, played by Remy Hii, made his first screen appearance on 28 June 2013. The character and casting was confirmed on 12 June 2013. Daniel Kilkelly from Digital Spy reported that Hii had already started filming with the show. Several pictures of Hii had been posted by Neighbours on their Instagram and Twitter accounts before the casting announcement. Hii told Kilkelly that he was unemployed and happened to be in Melbourne, where Neighbours is filmed, when he auditioned at the studio. Two days later, he found out he had the role. Hii explained that he was not nervous on his first day and that the cast had been very welcoming. When asked if he would be interested in a long-term role with the show, Hii said that he was "thrilled" with how the way the job had turned into a recurring guest role and that he had been asked back for filming in July.

Hudson was introduced as a new love interest for established character Chris Pappas (James Mason). Hii stated that he aware that Hudson was gay when he got the role and thought he was an interesting character with many layers to his personality. Hii told Kilkelly that Chris would enter into a relationship with Hudson with caution because he has just come out of a long-term romance. Hudson is also wary as he is new to the area and not sure who he can trust. When asked to describe his character, Hii replied "Hudson is a sensitive guy who is just starting to find himself. He has been incredibly focused all his life. He has had tunnel vision on this one goal, which is to be a champion swimmer, but since moving to Erinsborough he is starting to discover there is more out there for him." Hudson also becomes Joshua Willis's (Harley Bonner) rival, after they meet at the local pool. Like Josh, Hudson is an elite swimmer at the top of his game. He has a natural talent, which his parents noticed quite quickly and he is therefore less competitive and more confident than Josh.

Hudson meets his new teammate, Joshua Willis, during a meeting with their swim coach Don Cotter (John Adam). Hudson also meets Chris Pappas and go on a date. Hudson tells Chris that Don has convinced Josh to change to middle distance swimming to keep him out of his way. Chris tells Josh and he confronts Hudson. While Hudson and Chris argue about why Chris did not say anything about knowing Josh, Hudson suffers from chest pains. The pains continue and Chris calls the paramedics, who reveal that Hudson is taking performance-enhancing drugs. Chris urges Hudson to stop taking the drugs, saying they cannot be together until he does. Hudson agrees and he and Don part company. Realising Hudson has a lot of stuff to work through, Chris asks him not call. Hudson goes home to Sydney, but returns a couple of weeks later. He meets up with Chris and asks him out to lunch. Chris initially says no, but changes his mind. Hudson struggles to find a new swim coach due to Josh bad mouthing him. He considers moving to the United States, but Brad Willis (Kip Gamblin) decides to take him on. Paul Robinson (Stefan Dennis) approaches Hudson about a sponsorship deal. Paul threatens to revoke his offer when he learns about Hudson's drug use, but Hudson assures him that it was a one off and the deal goes ahead. Josh is hostile towards Hudson and he considers dropping Brad as his coach. They eventually make up. Mason Turner (Taylor Glockner) turns to Chris, Josh and Hudson for help when Robbo Slade (Aaron Jakubenko) threatens to post explicit footage of his sister, Amber (Jenna Rosenow) online. Hudson offers to lend Mason some money and the group come up with a plan to pay Robbo off and make sure that he cannot continue to blackmail them.

Robbo dies after being involved in a hit-and-run. Hudson is seen on CCTV footage near the accident site and he is questioned. Hudson tells the police that he went to speak to Don that night and Don backs up Hudson's story. When Hudson discovers Josh got into a fight with Robbo, he covers for him with Brad. Hudson loses interest in swimming and quits. Shortly after, he confesses to running down Robbo. He explains that he witnessed Robbo hassling Amber and had driven straight at him, intending to scare him, but instead he ran him down. Hudson is charged and he refuses to speak to Chris. Hudson is later sentenced to four years in prison. Chris visits Hudson, who tells him that he cut off contact as he needed time to prepare himself for prison. Hudson asks whether Chris read the letter he sent him and explains that he wrote to say he loved Chris. He also tells Chris that he cannot expect him to wait for him, but they agree to give their relationship another go. Hudson becomes frustrated when Chris is late to their video chat and they are cut off early. Hudson then gets into a fight and loses his phone and internet privileges. When Chris goes to visit Hudson, he appears distracted. Hudson then tries to trick Georgia Brooks (Saskia Hampele) into telling him what is going on with Chris. He then invites Chris back and asks Chris if he is seeing someone else. When Chris hesitates, Hudson breaks up with him. Chris returns the following day and explains that he is not cheating on Hudson, but a guy asked him out and he wanted to go because he was lonely. Hudson hates the thought of Chris staying with him out of guilt, and they say goodbye.

== Marty Kranic ==
Marty Kranic
- Neighbours character
- Portrayed by: Darius Perkins
- Duration: 2013–2014
- First appearance: 29 July 2013
- Last appearance: 20 January 2014
- Introduced by: Richard Jasek

Marty Kranic, played by Darius Perkins, made his first appearance on 29 July 2013. Perkins previously appeared in Neighbours as Scott Robinson in 1985. He was initially contracted for one month. Marty is "a shady associate" of Paul Robinson (Stefan Dennis). He has a talent for making awkward situations disappear. Perkins commented "It's great playing a bad guy because Scott Robinson was such a nice bloke and the writers have done a terrific job with Marty by showing another side."

Paul Robinson invites Marty to his apartment for a poker game, hoping to learn Marty's card shark skills. Marty asks Paul who he wants him to deal with and Paul tells him about Robbo Slade (Aaron Jakubenko). Paul later thanks Marty for teaching him how to use marked cards by giving him access to the Lassiter's executive suite for free. Marty agrees to keep an eye on Robbo and find anything that will give Paul some leverage over him. A few days later, Paul asks Marty for an update and Marty explains that he cannot get into Robbo's poker games. Paul suggests using one of the regulars that have been attending the games and tells Marty to make it happen quickly, as he wants Robbo gone. Marty then tries unsuccessfully asking Lucas Fitzgerald (Scott Major) for a way into Robbo's games. Not long after, Robbo dies following a hit and run. When Lucas is questioned by the police, he reveals that on the night of Robbo's accident, Marty told him Robbo was using marked cards. When Lucas confronted Robbo, Marty intervened and later brought Lucas the money he lost. Paul meets with Marty and tells him that Lucas has told the police about him. Marty tells Paul that he did not run Robbo over, he just used his powers of persuasion to make Robbo hand the money over. Marty refuses to go to the police to help Lucas and states that if Paul tries to pin the accident on him, he will make trouble for Paul. Marty is brought in for questioning, when Terese Willis (Rebekah Elmaloglou) recognises him from a photo. Marty lies to the police about seeing Toadfish Rebecchi (Ryan Moloney) committing the hit-and-run. A few months later, Marty returns and tries to blackmail Paul, who is running for mayor. Marty then tells Paul's opponent, Karl Kennedy (Alan Fletcher), about his connection with Paul and offers him information on Paul that would guarantee a win in the election. Karl refuses to use the information.

== Josie Lamb ==
Josie Lamb
- Neighbours character
- Portrayed by: Madison Daniel
- Duration: 2013–2014, 2017
- First appearance: 12 August 2013
- Last appearance: 10 March 2017
- Introduced by: Richard Jasek (2013); Jason Herbison (2017)
In-universe information
- Occupation: Student; Garden nursery worker
- Mother: Victoria Lamb
- Stepmother: Ellen Crabb

Josie Lamb, played by Madison Daniel, made her first screen appearance on 12 August. Daniel previously appeared in Neighbours as "snobby" Eden Hills Grammar student Claudia Howard in 2012. She was initially contracted to appear in the recurring role of Josie for ten months. Daniel returned to filming in 2016 and Josie began appearing from 6 February 2017.

Josie was introduced as "quite a confident character" and a friend of Callum Jones (Morgan Baker). Josie developed "a big crush" on Callum, but when she learned that he liked Imogen Willis (Ariel Kaplan), Josie decided to try and change herself to be more like Imogen. Josie began to change the way she looks by dieting and exercising. Callum's mother, Sonya (Eve Morey), notices this and tries to help. Morey encouraged the producers to tackle the issues of eating disorders and learned that they were already working on a storyline with the character of Imogen. She explained "People may be surprised that we're doing two eating disorder storylines in quick succession, but I think they've both been handled really well and they both explore completely different aspects of quite a complex issue. It also shows a perpetual cycle which is quite realistic, as Josie is influenced by Imogen's behaviour." Josie later signed up for the local fun run, in a bid to impress Callum. During the race, Josie goes to see Callum at the drinks stand, but when he ignores her, she decides to keep running without getting herself a drink. A combination of dehydration, not eating and her vigorous exercise routine cause Josie to collapse. Daniel said "Physically, it's just a matter of getting Josie on a drip and eating properly again. But for Josie to recover mentally will take a lot longer. Body-image issues don't just disappear overnight."

Josie is often bullied at school due to her intelligence, her appearance and having two mothers. She develops a crush on Callum Jones after they play an online game together. Josie buys Callum an expansion pack for the game for his birthday, but Callum assumes Bailey Turner (Calen Mackenzie) told her to and rejects it. Josie is upset by this, but Callum realises his mistake and accepts the gift. He and Josie become friends and begin hanging out. They decide to attend a photo exhibition together, but instead of meeting Callum there, Josie comes to his house. Callum's parents invite her to dinner, before they all attend the exhibition. Callum tells Imogen Willis that Josie is his girlfriend, so she does not realise that he has a crush on her. Callum apologises to Josie, but she is fine with it. When Callum's father, Toadie (Ryan Moloney), becomes the main suspect in a hit-and-run accident, Josie initially supports Callum, but later tells him they cannot not hang out anymore. It soon emerges that Josie's mother, Ellen (Louise Crawford), is the lead detective in the hit-and-run case. Josie notices that Callum likes Imogen and tries to wear her hair the same way as her. She also joins the gym to lose weight, causing Callum's mother, Sonya, to become concerned for her well-being. Josie changes her clothes and hair, but is disappointed when Callum fails to notice. She also begins excessively training for the local fun run, which concerns Sonya even more and she tells Josie that she does not need to change her appearance, especially for a boy. Biology teacher, Gemma Reeves (Kathryn Beck), manages to destroy Josie's self-confidence when she humiliates her in front of the class.

During the fun run, Josie collapses and has to be taken to the hospital, where she is diagnosed with malnutrition. Josie's parents are surprised by this and Josie explains that she has been skipping meals and training hard for the fun run. Ellen initially blames Sonya for the situation, but Josie corrects her saying she wants to be like Imogen. Callum asks Josie to the school dance, but she turns him down and begins ignoring him. After a chat with Imogen, who tells Josie about her bulimia, she decides to attend the dance. Callum tells Josie that he likes her and they kiss. They begin dating, but Josie stops talking to Callum when he became angry with her for suggesting Jacob Holmes (Clayton Watson) has a crush on his mother. To make things up with Josie, Callum buys her a puppy and Josie accepts Callum's apology. However, she has to give the puppy back because she is allergic to him. Callum surprises Josie on Valentine's Day with an engraved padlock that they lock onto the walkway over Lassiter's Lake. Bailey begins dating Josie Mackay (Kate Mylius) and he and Callum get the two Josie's together so they can bond. The girls get on well together, but become fed up of the boys ignoring them and they leave. Josie starts to question her relationship with Callum, leading him to declare his love for her. They then decide that they are ready to have sex for the first time, but later change their minds. Josie is supportive of Callum when he leaves for the United States on a scholarship. The night before he goes, Callum and Josie sleep in the same room. Bailey asks Josie to get the girls' hockey team to join his astronomy club, so they can then vote him in as club president. Josie tells Bailey that the team have already signed up with forms given to them by Alice Azikiwe (Vivienne Awosoga), Bailey's rival. Bailey then realises the team have signed a proxy form, meaning they have voted Alice in as president.

While Josie attends university, her parents Ellen and Victoria (Claudia Greenstone) separate. When they try to reunite, Josie reappears, and realises Victoria has feelings for Stephanie Scully (Carla Bonner). She warns Steph to stay away from Victoria, as she and Ellen work through their problems. After someone breaks Steph's taillight, she attempts to fix it but is caught by Steph. When she finds Toadie's daughter Nell in the street, Steph confronts her. When Josie insults Steph, Steph warns her to stay away, and Josie files an intervention order. It is later discovered that Ellen is behind all these events and the order is expunged.

== Alek Pocoli ==
Alek Pocoli
- Neighbours character
- Portrayed by: Damian De Montemas
- First appearance: 9 September 2013
- Last appearance: 11 September 2013
- Introduced by: Richard Jasek
In-universe information
- Wife: Vanessa Villante (until 2013)

Alek Pocoli, played by Damian De Montemas, made his first screen appearance on 9 September 2013. De Montemas's casting was announced on 30 August 2013. The actor commented "It's taken a while but finally, I can say I've been on Neighbours, tick that box." For the role, De Montemas was asked to acquire an accent and he explained that the director preferred that he did not have a thick eastern European accent since Alek had been educated in England and had lived in the United States. He called Alek's accent "a hybrid of different cultures" and added that if no one can work out what it is, then he would have "fulfilled the brief". Alek is established character Vanessa Villante's (Alin Sumarwata) estranged ex-husband. He comes to Erinsborough to make an important announcement, that rocks Vanessa's world and leave her fiancé Lucas Fitzgerald (Scott Major) "seething." De Montemas liked his character's sense of humour, which riles Lucas.

Alek comes to Erinsborough looking for Vanessa Villante. He tries her home first and then tracks her down to Harold's Store, where Vanessa is surprised to see him. When she asks why he is in town, Alek tells Vanessa that she was the one trying to get in touch with him. Vanessa explains that it was not her, but a woman pretending to be her. Alek tells Vanessa that he has been thinking about her and then admits that he did not file their annulment papers, so they are still married. Alek explains that an annulment would have brought shame on his family and he hoped that he would always see Vanessa again. He also apologises for how he treated her during their relationship. Alek invites Vanessa to his hotel room, so they can talk. Her partner, Lucas Fitzgerald, then turns up and learns that they are still married. Having become very wealthy since his marriage to Vanessa, Alek offers her $100,000 so she will not make a claim on his assets. Vanessa agrees to take the money and they sort out the annulment. Before Alek goes back home to his fiancée, he mentions a hotel that they stayed in, which was in Tirana, Albania, to Vanessa before they say their final goodbyes.

== Gemma Reeves ==
Gemma "Gem" Reeves, played by Kathryn Beck, made her first screen appearance on 7 October 2013. Beck's casting was announced in September 2013, while the character had previously been mentioned on-screen. The actress stated "I loved playing Gem because she pushes all the boundaries and just when you think she has gone too far, she goes further." Gem is the cousin of established characters Georgia Brooks (Saskia Hampele) and Toadfish Rebecchi (Ryan Moloney). Beck explained that Gem comes to Erinsborough to catch up with Georgia, who is her favourite cousin and someone she has idolised since they were children. Georgia is "delighted" to see Gem and convinces her to move into Toadie's house, with Beck hinting that is when "things get interesting". A TV Week reporter branded Gem a "hottie" and a "blonde bombshell".

== Eric Edwards ==
Eric Edwards
- Neighbours character
- Portrayed by: Paul O'Brien
- First appearance: 10 October 2013
- Last appearance: 29 October 2013
- Introduced by: Richard Jasek
In-universe information
- Wife: Mandy Edwards
- Daughters: Mia Edwards

Eric Edwards, played by Paul O'Brien, made his first appearance on 10 October. The character and O'Brien's casting was announced on 2 October 2013. The actor filmed his scenes during a break from shooting a feature film in Jakarta. A role which required him to grow a beard. Of his casting, O'Brien commented "The beard was definitely non-negotiable as I needed it to finish the film. However, the timing worked out well to do both projects, and I hope the new look adds to the role." Eric is a client of local lawyer Toadfish Rebecchi (Ryan Moloney), who becomes involved in a dispute.

Eric claims he has injured his back at the local gym, after he used a faulty stepping machine. Brad Willis (Kip Gamblin) insists that there was an "out of order" note on the machine, but it has disappeared. Brad tends to Eric, who says that he will go to see his physical therapist for treatment. Eric decides to sue the gym and hires Toadfish Rebecchi to be his lawyer. Eric drops the case after his injuries are proved to be the result of a skiing accident. Toadie later calls Eric into his office to talk about a potential case against the ski instructor. However, Toadie learns that Eric was drunk on the day of the accident and lied about it. Eric then decides to sue Toadie for negligence, after learning Brad's daughter, Imogen (Ariel Kaplan), was working at the law office during his case. When his wife, Mandy (Emelia Burns), finds out Eric is suing Toadie, she moves out of their home with their young daughter. Toadie and his wife, Sonya (Eve Morey), invite Eric to their house for lunch, along with Mandy. When Toadie and Sonya argue, it causes Eric and Mandy to look at their own marriage problems. Eric then decides to drop the legal case and sort things out with Mandy, who agrees to move back home.

== Jacob Holmes ==
Jacob Holmes
- Neighbours character
- Portrayed by: Clayton Watson
- Duration: 2013–2014
- First appearance: 28 November 2013
- Last appearance: 4 February 2014
- Introduced by: Richard Jasek
In-universe information
- Occupation: Handyman
- Wife: Hannah Sutton (until 2013)
- Sons: Elliott Holmes

Jacob Holmes, played by Clayton Watson, made his first appearance on 28 November 2013. The character was introduced as "a struggling widow" and single father who befriends Sonya Rebecchi (Eve Morey) via her online blog. After leaving the brakes off his son, Elliott's (Ryder Smyth) pram, it almost rolls into Lassiter’s Lake and leaves Jacob shaken. He takes advantage of Sonya's "kind nature" and leave Elliott with her, before taking off. When he does return, Sonya continues to help him through his grief over his wife's death. Knowing that he needs money, she asks him to build a juice bar at her nursery, while she looks after Elliott. Rebecca Lake from TV Week said Sonya's offer was just "fueling Jacob's hopes for romance". Lake's prediction came true when Jacob later kisses Sonya. Dianne Butler of the Herald Sun said she wanted "Sonya and sad-eyed Jacob to have a hot affair".

After reading Sonya Mitchell's blog about parenting, Jacob gets in touch and asks for advice. He later asks if they can meet and Sonya is surprised when he turns up, admitting that she thought he was a woman. Jacob explains that his wife, Hannah, died shortly after giving birth to their son, Elliott, and he has no support. Sonya helps Jacob out with Elliott. When Elliott's pram almost runs into Lassiter's Lake, Jacob is shaken and believes he is not a good father. He then leaves Elliot with Sonya, asking her to look after him. When Elliot is taken to hospital, Sonya contacts Jacob to tell him that his son could be made a ward of the state if he does not return quickly. Jacob arrives at the hospital and apologises to Sonya for leaving Elliott with her. He is unhappy to learn that Sonya's husband, Toadfish Rebecchi (Ryan Moloney), has contacted his in-laws. Sonya offers to give Jacob some building work at her nursery and she encourages him and Toadie to bond.

Jacob kisses Sonya, but realises it was a mistake and apologises. Jacob asks for Toadie's help when Hannah's parents decide to fight him for custody of Elliott. While Toadie helps Jacob, Sonya makes it clear to him that they can no longer be friends and encourages Georgia Brooks (Saskia Hampele) to spend time with him instead. Sonya later confesses to Toadie that Jacob kissed her and he is angry with Jacob. He agrees to continue helping Jacob with the mediation for Elliott's custody. When Jacob learns that Hannah's parents knew about Elliott's illness, he accuses Toadie of telling them. Sonya informs Jacob that Hannah's parents used a private detective and he feels guilty about accusing Toadie. Jacob thinks about handing Elliott over to his in-laws, but Sonya tells him to fight for his son. Jacob eventually agrees. He also declares his feelings for Sonya, but she rejects him and he decides to move to Adelaide to be closer to his in-laws.

== Others ==
Date(s)	Character	Actor	Circumstances
11 January	Gabby Ross	Hannah Vanderheide	Gabby, Eloise and Michaela apply for a waitressing job at Charlie's, but Natasha Williams sabotages their chances due to jealousy.
11 January	Eloise Russell	Amy Arnott	Gabby, Eloise and Michaela apply for a waitressing job at Charlie's, but Natasha Williams sabotages their chances due to jealousy.
11 January	Michaela Douglas	Caitlin Pascoe	Gabby, Eloise and Michaela apply for a waitressing job at Charlie's, but Natasha Williams sabotages their chances due to jealousy.
16 January–11 March	Brian O'Loughlin	Paul Denny	Brian helps Priya Kapoor organise a school board meeting and defends her against Paul Robinson. He later tells Priya that she has his full support. Brian admits to sending Priya obscene text messages, but when she reports him to the police, Brian states that Priya has been harassing him. Priya is fired from her job and she begs Brian to admit to making the accusations up. He agrees, but only if she spends one night with him. Brian later meets with Susan Kennedy, who tells him she is doing a story on sexual harassment. She then blackmails him into withdrawing the accusations against Priya, by telling him that she has spoken to other women he works with about his behaviour. Brian also quits his position on the school board.
16 January	Nate Fuller	Ryan Jones	Nate attends a soccer match in the park with his colleagues, Aidan Foster and Georgia Brooks. During the game, Nate trips Aidan and injures his ankle. Chris Pappas later confronts Nate, who admits that Aidan was not very civil to him on his first day at the hospital, so he stopped being civil to him.
17 January	Tony Corvus	Mick Alford	Tony comes to Simmons & Colbert to discuss his divorce with Ajay Kapoor. After listening to Tony and his wife, Sheree, arguing, Ajay suddenly decides to leave. He tells Tony that he is not working for him anymore and wishes Sheree luck.
17 January	Sheree Corvus	Jacqui Sundbery	Tony comes to Simmons & Colbert to discuss his divorce with Ajay Kapoor. After listening to Tony and his wife, Sheree, arguing, Ajay suddenly decides to leave. He tells Tony that he is not working for him anymore and wishes Sheree luck.
21–31 January	Brett Letson	Brendan McCallum	Brett comes to Ramsay Street to purchase Rhys Lawson's car. A week later, he meets Lucas Fitzgerald and asks him about the car's history. Lucas checks the car over and Brett wonders why Rhys was so keen to sell it. He adds that he had to put the money into some fund.
23 January	Will Clifton	Garth Ploog	When Will goes to Charlie's for a drink, Sheila Canning tries to set him up with Chris Pappas. However, Chris tells Will that he is not ready for a new relationship.
23 January	Lyndall Stokes	Clare Griggs	Lyndall goes on a date with Karl Kennedy and they get on well. But Karl later explains that he is not over his ex.
24 January	Daryl Banick	Mark Doggett	Daryl notices Sonya Mitchell breastfeeding her daughter and complains to Natasha Williams about it.
24–25 January	Polly Lipcer	Kylie Trounson	Polly arrives at Charlie's for a mother's group meeting and notices Sonya Mitchell is upset. When she learns that Sonya was asked to leave for breastfeeding her daughter, Polly encourages her to complain. She later asks a reporter from a local newspaper to write a story about the situation.
4 February–7 October 2014, 5 May–14 June 2016	Wendy Leung	Natalia Ko	Wendy is a receptionist at Lassiter's Hotel. She informs Paul Robinson that Sarah Beaumont has checked in early and he asks her to arrange a welcome basket for Sarah. Paul later berates Wendy for giving him a bottle of Californian sparkling wine, instead of French Champagne. Wendy later serves drinks during a charity function at the local Community Centre. Terese asks Wendy to find out more information about Paige Smith, who briefly stayed at the hotel. Wendy finds someone who saw Paige in the complex on the night Harold's Store was trashed. A couple of years later, Wendy meets with John Doe, who asks her if she can recall their meeting prior to the explosion at Lassiter's. Wendy tells him that he asked about the Mornington Peninsula, but did not introduce himself. Wendy later meets with John and Paige, who ask her about that morning again. Wendy repeats her story and adds that John was not a guest at the hotel, but came to look at the leaflet stand.
6 February–2 April	Alistair O'Loughlin	Rahart Sadiqzai	Alistair is a student at Erinsborough High, who calls Rani Kapoor a skank after seeing a Facebook page about her family. He later calls her mother, Priya, the same name, while he is with his friends. Alistair sets up a Facebook page to insult the Kapoor family and is only found out when Callum Jones takes his phone. Priya calls Alistair and his mother into her office and suspends him. When Alistair next sees Rani, he has a go at her and reveals that his parents have been arguing. Weeks later, Alistair returns to school and tries to apologise to Rani about the Facebook page and her mother's death. She gets upset and runs off, while Callum almost gets into a fight with Alistair when he demands to know what happened.
8 February	Phillipa Curtis	Louise Rocchi	Phillipa meets Ajay Kapoor at a karate lesson in the community centre. She later runs into him at Charlie's and they have a drink, before leaving together.
18 February	Diane Stevens	Mahalia Brown	Diane and her friend, Jana, go on a double date with Rhys Lawson and Kyle Canning. Rhys and Diane decide to skip dinner and leave together.
18–28 February	Jana Noviac	Kyrie Capri	Jana and her friend, Diane, go on a double date with Kyle Canning and Rhys Lawson. Diane and Rhys leave early and Jana meets Kyle's grandmother, Sheila. Jana and Kyle kiss and agree to meet up again. They start dating, but Jana tells Georgia Brooks that while she likes Kyle a lot, he does not seem that interested in her. Georgia tells Jana not to worry and that he might just need time to get over his last relationship. Kyle later breaks up with Jana.
21–26 February	Ralphie Mahone	Daniel Bowden	Chris Pappas asks Ralphie for his help in repairing damage done to a car. Ralphie later tells Chris that he needs paying right away. When Chris cannot pay him, Ralphie asks him to rework some vehicles for him. When Ralphie learns that the car he delivered to the garage was taken away by the police, he gets angry with Chris. Mason Turner intervenes and Ralphie later tells Chris that he has got a deal on some storm damaged cars, so everything is square between them.
25 February	Janette O'Loughlin	Wendy John	Janette accompanies her son, Alistair, to Priya Kapoor's office at Erinsborough High. She is shocked to learn that Alistair set up a Facebook page to insult Priya's family.
15 March–10 June 2014	Kelly Merolli	Maya Aleksandra	Snr. Const. Merolli is Matt Turner's colleague. She tells him that she is looking forward to working in Erinsborough, having previously been stationed in West Waratah. Kelly and Matt deal with a break-in at the local antiques shop and review the CCTV footage. Matt thinks he recognises the perpetrator, but dismisses the idea. Kelly later brings Matt an E-FIT of the suspect, who has since committed more burglaries, and he tells her that they are looking for Robbo Slade. Sonya Mitchell, the key witness to a failed robbery at Lassiter's Hotel, identifies Robbo and Mason Turner, leading Kelly to arrest Mason. Bailey Turner and Matt confess to Kelly their roles in a robbery in Mount Isa. Local councillor Allan Hewitt comes to Kelly and reports Paul Robinson for trying to bribe him. Kelly also has to deal with Lachie Maroon when he accuses Kyle Canning of assaulting him. Weeks later, Kelly and Matt help track down Stephanie Scully when she kidnaps Patrick Villante. Matt's wife, Lauren, at one time suspects Kelly of having an affair with Matt but later discovers Kelly is teaching Matt to dance so he can impress her. Kelly continues to investigate crimes alongside Matt, including the attack on Robbo Slade and the murder of Kate Ramsay. Kelly later threatens to forcefully remove Naomi Canning if she tries to push her way through the baracade blocking off Ramsay Street during a lockdown, which sees Kelly and Matt arrest Stephen Montague.
19 March–1 May, 26 April 2016	Minister David Fry	Gary Gartside	Minister Fry conducts Sonya Mitchell and Toadfish Rebecchi's wedding. He later returns to conduct the couple's vow renewal ceremony. Three years later, David is about to marry Daniel Robinson and Imogen Willis, when her parents interrupt the service.
20 March–8 April 2014	Julie Parelli	Krissy Hamilton	Following a gas explosion at a wedding reception, Julie goes into the collapsed marquee and attend to a seriously injured Priya Kapoor. Later that year, Julie is called to Number 26 to treat Hudson Walsh when he suffers from chest pains and shortness of breath. Julie advises Hudson to see his GP, while she tells his partner, Chris, that it appears Hudson has been using drugs. The following year, Julie is called out when Kate Ramsay is shot. Julie and her partner do all they can, but pronounce Kate dead at the scene. Julie later hands Kate's fiancé Mark, her engagement ring.
22 March	Eddie Lawson	Ned Manning	Eddie is Rhys Lawson's father. He comes to Erinsborough to meet his son, unaware that he has died. When Kyle Canning shows up, Eddie immediately assumes that Rhys does not want to see him. Kyle then breaks then news of Rhys' death to him. Kyle gives Eddie a bundle of letters that Rhys sent to him when he was younger, as well as his golf clubs.
2 April–7 May	Tony Daley	Giovanni Bartuccio	Tony is the manager of Lassiter's Hotel. After a gas explosion occurs during a wedding reception held in the hotel's car park, Paul Robinson asks Tony to gather statements from all employees who were working on the day, making sure that they say that all health and safety standards were followed. Tony is unsure, noting that this was not the case. Paul later tries to persuade Tony to commit perjury. Paul's sister, Lucy, fires Tony from the manager's job, but promises to get him a job with the company elsewhere.
2 April–8 May	Tina Maroon	Annie Stanford	When a tired Georgia Brooks asks Tina to help her administer medication to a patient, Tina suddenly notices that Georgia has the wrong room and patient. She warns Georgia that this is the type of mistake that happens when she comes to work without enough sleep. Tina later steals some medication from the drugs cupboard, which Georgia left open, and Georgia is fired. When Tina's son, Lachie, is taken to the police station, Tina comes to see him and Georgia realises that Tina, who had complained of a bad back, stole the medication. Tina is charged for her crime and Georgia gets her job back.
3 April	Mia Johnson	Michelle Bourke	Mia has a one-night stand with Paul Robinson. The following morning, she meets his niece, Kate, and has to correct Paul when he gets her name wrong.
5–25 April	Pete Clark	Paul Cousins	Sheila Canning hires Pete to work at Charlie's bar. After cutting him arm, Pete goes to the hospital and is treated by Georgia Brooks, whom he tries to flirt with. Pete later asks Georgia out for a drink and she agrees. When Georgia tries to kiss him, Pete backs off and she angrily asks him if he is gay. Georgia later apologises, telling him about her ex-boyfriend who made advances towards another guy. Pete offers Georgia some drugs to make her feel better and they spend the night partying. When Pete comes to see Georgia a few days later, she tells him that she they should hang out anymore. While Pete is at the hospital getting his arm checked, he confronts Georgia and calls her a user. In her haste to leave the room, Georgia forgets to take the keys to the drugs store with her. When Sheila catches Pete selling drugs at Charlie's, she fires him.
15 April–7 May	Cassie Nicholls	Lisa Marie Shaw	Cassie becomes involved in a Twitter war with Amber Turner, when Amber sends her a complimentary message that gets autocorrected. Cassie begins bullying Amber and starts to turn many of the other students against her. However, when the students start siding with Amber, Cassie fails to turn up at school and goes missing. She later sends Amber texts implying that she is going to harm herself. Amber finds Cassie and they talk through their issues, before returning to the school. A couple of weeks later, Cassie attends Amber's birthday party. She tells Kyle Canning that a student at school has been selling prescription drugs from his locker.
25 April–10 May, 30 March 2015	Carol Crane	Sally Bourne	Carol investigates a case of missing medication at the hospital. She speaks to Georgia Brooks, who left the keys to the drugs store unattended, while a patient was in the room alone. Carol suspends Georgia pending a full investigation. Carol later speaks with Karl, who tells her that Georgia is a good nurse. Carol asks him about the sleeping pills he prescribed for her and they continue their chat at the hospital. When Georgia is found to be innocent of stealing the medication, Carol apologises to her for jumping to conclusions and tells her the incident will not be added to her record. Carol then encourages Georgia to apply for an emergency overseas course and Georgia thanks her. In 2015, when a high-profile patient is brought in, Carol asks Georgia not to mention her presence to anyone. Carol is forced to suspend Georgia when it seems she has posted details about the patient on her social media page.
29 April–6 May	Allan Hewitt	Mick Preston	Allan is a councillor, who meets with Paul Robinson and Rhiannon Bates to discuss the apartments Paul wants to build. Allan touches Rhiannon and implies that he wants to have sex with her. Rhiannon states that that will not be happening and she leaves with a bottle of champagne that Allan bought. Rhiannon later reports Allan and Paul to the police and Allan states that Paul was trying to bribe him.
8–14 May	Seamus Illich	Scott Smart	Seamus comes to Fitzgerald Motors to get his car looked at by Chris Pappas and goes on a date with him. Seamus and Chris arrange to meet up again, but when Chris fails to show, Seamus assumes that he stood him up. Chris later explains that he received a text from Seamus saying that the date was cancelled.
8 May	Lachie Maroon	Matthew Connell	After his mother, Tina, takes some prescription medication from the hospital, Lachie steals it from her to sell to students at his school. When Lachie is confronted by Kyle Canning, he claims Kyle assaulted him and they are both taken to the police station. Tina comes to get Lachie and Georgia Brooks realises that she took the medication.
4 June–9 July	Don Cotter	John Adam	Don is a swim coach, who notices Joshua Willis at the pool. He advises Joshua to practice some different strokes, which annoys Joshua's coach and father, Brad. While training in the gym, Joshua approaches Don for some advice. They train together and when Don asks him to join his squad, Joshua accepts. Don convinces Joshua to change to middle distance swimming, so that his other swimmer Hudson Walsh will have a better chance at winning gold. Don asks Joshua to choose between swimming and his girlfriend, Amber Turner. He later warns Amber to stay away from Joshua. Don starts under timing Joshua and he asks to be let out of their contract. Don initially refuses, but relents when Joshua reveals that he knows Don has forced Hudson to take performance-enhancing drugs. Don and Hudson also part ways.
2 July–28 May 2014	Josie Mackay	Kate Mylius	Josie and her friends run into Bailey Turner and Callum Jones at Lassiter's Lake and Josie invites them to hang out at Harold's Store. Callum declines, but accepts on behalf of Bailey, knowing that Josie has a crush on him. Josie spots Rani Kapoor and asks for some advice on how to talk to Bailey.
4 July	Nathan White	Matt Okine	Nathan is hired to take photographs for Lassiter's wedding brochure. He becomes frustrated at the lack of chemistry between the models, Kate Ramsay and Kyle Canning. Nathan also becomes annoyed at Paul Robinson's interference.
4 July–26 November	Stu Branson	Darcy Kent	While he is in Charlie's, Stu and his mates watch The Right Prescription perform. He asks Karl Kennedy where the girl from last week is and when Karl says it is just him, some other customers leave. Stu later attends a poker game run by Robbo Slade and loses to Lucas Fitzgerald. Stu attends another gig at Charlie's, this time to watch Georgia Brooks. He and the rest of the crowd begin chanting for Georgia to sing her most popular song.
9–11 July 2013, 18 February 2014, 30 October 2014	Bob Kind	Peter Flaherty	Bob runs the local AA and GA meetings at the community centre. Sonya and Walter Mitchell attend a meeting together and Bob thanks Walter for his story. A couple of days later, Bob asks Sonya where Walter is, telling her that the group were impressed with him. Sonya tells Bob that Walter is good, but he is not coming. Months later, Bob tells Sonya that he has been given a job offer interstate and asks her to take over his current job. Sonya's husband, Toadie Rebecchi, contacts Bob later in the year to ask him about anyone who has held a grudge against Sonya in GA meetings, as he has been receiving hate letters. Bob tells Toadie that everything during meetings is strictly anonymous, then leaves.
10–19 July	Clay Blair	Charlie Terrier	Imogen Willis introduces Clay to Amber Turner at a party. Clay and Amber get talking and then share a kiss. They later go on a date to Harold's Store, where Joshua Willis interrupts them. While they are kissing in his car, Clay tries to take things further with Amber and she rejects him. Amber then gets out of the car and Clay drives off. Amber and Clay arrange to meet up, so he can give back her phone, which she left in his car. However, Robbo Slade intimidates Clay into giving the phone to him. Clay then tells Amber he is sorry for what he did and asks her to pass the message on to Robbo.
12 August	Harry Austin	Damien Aylward	Harry attends a poker game run by Robbo Slade and wins. He goes to the garage to pay off a debt that he owed Lucas Fitzgerald and apologises for how it long took. Harry tries to tempt Lucas into gambling, but Lucas explains that he does not gamble anymore. However, he changes his mind and Harry explains that the buy in is $500, before he leaves.
13 August	Graeme Francis	Aston Elliot	Greame attends a poker game run by Robbo Slade. He and Stu Branson lose to Lucas Fitzgerald.
23 August	Elsie Young	Diana Greentree	Elsie meets Lou Carpenter at the community centre and they go to Charlie's for a drink. Elsie is horrified when Sheila Canning asks her how she is going to pay for Lou's services as a male escort. Elsie throws her drink at Lou and leaves.
28 August–6 November, 9 February 2016 – 6 September 2017	Ellen Crabb	Louise Crawford	A homicide detective who takes charge of the Robbo Slade case, following his death. Along with her partner, David Oakley, they question Imogen Willis and Mason Turner over their whereabouts on the night Robbo was run down. Crabb and Oakley continue to question suspects, including Chris Pappas, Hudson Walsh and Lucas Fitzgerald. She suspects one of them is lying to her. Marty Kranic tells Crabb that he saw Toadfish Rebecchi in the car that hit Robbo and she goes to Charlie's to arrest Toadie. She finds her daughter, Josie, having dinner with Toadie's family and sends her home. Toadie is charged with the crime, but Crabb and Matt Turner have doubts and look through the evidence again. Brad Willis reveals Hudson's alibi is false and Hudson confesses to being the one who ran down Robbo. Later that year, Ellen and her partner, Victoria, are called to the hospital when Josie collapses from malnutrition. Josie tells them she wanted to lose weight quickly and be more attractive, which Ellen initially blames on Sonya Rebecchi. Ellen and Victoria make it clear Josie should not change herself for other people. A few years later, Ellen works a burglary case and tells Mark Brennan that all the evidence points to his fiancée Paige Smith. Mark is then forced to arrest Paige on their wedding day. Several months later, Ellen works with Mark on the Lassiter's Explosion case. When Mark's girlfriend Stephanie Scully is stalked by Ari Philcox, Ellen orders Mark off the case, but he continually gets involved. While talking to Steph, Ellen mentions that she and Victoria have separated. Ellen is present when Mark is stabbed by a psychotic Ari. Months later, Mark asks Ellen if he can look into Toadie and Dee Bliss' car accident from 2003, as a woman claiming to be Dee has turned up. Ellen offers to look up the case file for him, while he deals with a spate of robberies. Ellen starts harassing Steph after Steph forms a relationship with Victoria. Ellen chases Steph, who is riding a motorbike, in a police car. This leads her to drive into Paige's car at an intersection. Later Ellen, whilst in hospital, confesses and is suspended from the force. Upon her return, Ellen helps Mark and Steph burn evidence incriminating Sonya for the hit-and-run at the Erinsborough Backpackers. After Ellen helps Mark interrogate Finn Kelly, she announces her resignation out of guilt for tampering with evidence.
28 August–18 September	David Oakley	Mike Steele	A homicide detective and Ellen Crabb's partner. Together, they question several suspects and Toadfish Rebecchi becomes the prime suspect. When some CCTV footage shows Hudson Walsh near to the scene of the hit-and-run, he is questioned by Oakley. Hudson admits that he was on the way home, but decided to go see his former swim coach, who backs up his story. When Oakley goes to check on the progress of Senior Constable Matt Turner and Kelly Merolli at Robbo's squat, he cannot contain his dislike of Matt and decides to take him off the case, fearing that he is too involved. A couple of weeks later, Marty Kranic comes forward and says he saw Toadie get into the car. Toadie is charged with the crime, but then Brad Willis reveals Hudson's alibi is false and Hudson confesses to being the one who ran down Robbo.
6 September	Margaret Leeds	Gloria Ajenstat	While looking for Toadfish Rebecchi, Margaret encounters his wife Sonya and tells her that she would like Toadie to give her file to her new lawyer. When Sonya asks why, Margaret reveals that she heard Toadie had been charged with manslaughter. Sonya convinces Margaret to wait, as Toadie is away, but Margaret later sees him and tells him she has a new lawyer.
19 September, 2 April 2015, 12 October 2016	Constable Miranda Coby	Amy Gubana	Constable Coby takes Hudson Walsh's fingerprints after he is arrested for striking Robbo Slade with a car. Two years later, she assists Mark Brennan in a police sting to arrest Dennis Dimato for stealing cars. The following year, she helps clear up Power Street, after Stephanie Scully crashes her motorbike. Paul Robinson asks her what happened and Constable Coby tells him Steph appears to have swerved to avoid something.
24 September–2 October	Amali Ward	Herself	Paul Robinson gives Amali a song written by Georgia Brooks, and she performs it at Charlie's. After a meeting with Paul, Amali goes to speak to Georgia. But Paul warns her that Georgia would be not be interested and just wants the money from the song. However, Amali later catches Georgia and asks her about changing some of the lyrics. Georgia's boyfriend, Kyle, tries to talk to Amali, but Paul interrupts them and sends Kyle away. Georgia later comes to Amali and asks why she told the press that she wrote the song. Amali tells Georgia that she did give an interview. Kyle and Amali later talk and he explains that Georgia is a singer and wrote the song about him. Amali decides to give the song back to Georgia.
24 September–19 May 2015	Danni Ferguson	Laura McIntosh	Danni takes her car to Fitzgerald Motors and asks Chris Pappas to look it over, but she receives poor service and leaves. Danni returns to inform Chris that she is the new manager. Danni gives Chris a formal warning when he arrives late to work and pours coolant into an engine. After some of the cars on the forecourt are keyed, Danni reviews the CCTV footage and notices the culprit visited Chris earlier in the day. He admits that the man was a one-night stand who he rejected, causing Danni to give him another warning. Danni hires Mark Brennan as a mechanic and confides in him about her abusive ex-partner Stephen Montague. After learning Danni is sleeping in the garage, Brennan invites her to move in with him. Montague attempts to kidnap Danni, but Brennan stops him. Danni kisses Brennan, but he rejects her and she apologises. Montague gets out on bail and Danni briefly leaves. Montague becomes the prime suspect in Kate Ramsay's murder and Brennan attempts to use Danni as bait to draw Montague out. Sonya Mitchell helps Danni to leave town. On her return, Danni checks the garage and tells Chris that he is not ready to return to work after he suffers a brain injury. Danni strikes Matt Turner with her car, after texting at the wheel, causing his death. She drives away, but later hands herself into the police when Tyler and Paige Smith find her car. On the day of Matt's funeral, Danni visits the Turners to apologise. Danni asks Toadie to represent her and he initially agrees. Danni also asks Lauren for a character reference, but is told to leave. When Danni claims that Matt and Brad Willis were also to blame for arguing in the road, forensics find that she had indeed swerved into them. Toadie realises that he can no longer represent her. Danni forges a friendship with Josh Willis, after he explains that he had been in a similar situation. They later kiss, but are unsure what their relationship is headed. Danni later realises that Josh's life is complicated enough without her and she thanks him for his support, before walking out of his life.
26 September–8 October	Meg Morris	Aliesha Pearson	Upon arriving at Lassiter's Hotel, Meg flirts with Mason Turner when he tells her she has been given a free upgrade. Mason also helps Meg pick up her belongings when her case opens. They later go for a drink at Charlie's. Meg checks out two weeks early, telling hotel manager, Terese, that she came onto Mason and he rejected her.
1 October	Derek Blasko	John Jones	Derek accosts Sheila Canning, while she is chasing after Chris Pappas. Despite Sheila rejecting him, Derek continues to ask if she wants company and follows her in his car, leaving Sheila shaken.
9 October	Stavros Alkinos	Peter Berzanskis	Stavros is a mature photography student, who takes pictures around Erinsborough. Sheila Canning notices him and believes he is taking pictures of her. She confronts Stavros and throws his camera to the ground. He presses charges, but drops them when Sheila pays for a new camera and writes him a letter of apology.
18 October	Miguel Ferrerr	Bartholomew Walsh	Miguel has a one-night stand with Chris Pappas. When he asks if they can continue to date, Chris rejects him and Miguel keys the cars in the garage where Chris works as revenge.
23 October–21 November	Jackson Bates	Finn Woodlock	Jackson is Rhiannon Bates's young son. When Rhiannon returns to Erinsborough, she brings Jackson with her and they move into Number 28. Jackson is happy to see Mason Turner again. Jackson runs away when he thinks Rhiannon is going to send him away and Chris Pappas finds him.
25–29 October, 7 May 2014	Mandy Edwards	Emelia Burns	Mandy arrives at Harold's Store for a mother's group with her daughter, but finds she is too late. She bonds with Sonya Mitchell and realises that Sonya is married to Toadfish Rebecchi, the lawyer who represented her husband Eric. Mandy opens up to Sonya about her problems and Eric's injury. When Eric tries to sue Toadie, Mandy becomes fed up with his behaviour and moves out. She meets up with Sonya for a chat, and later comes over for lunch, along with Eric. When Toadie and Sonya argue, it causes Eric and Mandy to look at their own marriage problems and choose to sort them out. A few months later, Sonya runs into Mandy, who reveals things between her and Eric are good. They are thinking of renewing their vows and Sonya introduces her to Susan Kennedy, who is training to be a celebrant. However, Mandy goes with another celebrant when Susan's husband interferes.
25–29 October	Mia Edwards	Lily Kabengele	Mia is Eric and Mandy Edwards young daughter.
6 November, 20 October 2016 – 30 January 2017	Victoria Lamb	Claudia Greenstone	Victoria is Josie Lamb's mother and Ellen Crabb's partner. She and Ellen are called to the hospital when Josie collapses with malnutrition. They realise that she has been unhappy and tell her that she should not try to change herself for other people. Three years later, Victoria is working as a consultant at the hospital. She interviews Sonya Rebecchi, Toadfish Rebecchi, Stephanie Scully and Mark Brennan about their surrogacy plans. She clears them to move onto the next stage of the process. Victoria informs Steph that the fertility tests have shown she has low ovarian reserves. She then asks Steph and Mark to think about whether they want to continue with the surrogacy. They agree to try one round of IVF, but Victoria tells then Steph's eggs are not viable. Steph later meets with Victoria to tell her that Sonya is going to donate an egg. Steph asks for Victoria's support, but Victoria expresses her concerns to Steph and Toadie. Weeks later, Steph and Victoria run into each other and Victoria enquires about the surrogacy. Steph helps to fix her car and Victoria buys them dinner. Victoria and Steph later see each other at The Waterhole, and when Victoria's date cancels, she and Steph share a bottle of champagne. Victoria then invites Steph back to her place for coffee. Days later, a drunken Victoria kisses Steph. She apologises the following day and admits that she has feelings for Steph.
12 November	William Royce	Leigh Gathercole	William is a photographer, who is due to photograph Yumi and Goro Nakano in the grounds of Lassiter's Hotel, following their wedding. However, he falls ill and tells Terese Willis that he cannot go through with the job. Terese hires Amber Turner to photograph Yumi and Goro instead.
12 November	Yumi Nakano	Grace Lee	William is a photographer, who is due to photograph Yumi and Goro Nakano in the grounds of Lassiter's Hotel, following their wedding. However, he falls ill and tells Terese Willis that he cannot go through with the job. Terese hires Amber Turner to photograph Yumi and Goro instead.
12 November	Goro Nakano	Simon Chan	William is a photographer, who is due to photograph Yumi and Goro Nakano in the grounds of Lassiter's Hotel, following their wedding. However, he falls ill and tells Terese Willis that he cannot go through with the job. Terese hires Amber Turner to photograph Yumi and Goro instead.
18 November–16 January 2014	Ruby Knox	Maggie Naouri	Ruby is a journalist who interviews Joshua Willis for the West Waratah Star. Ruby and Josh get on well and Ruby later meets up with Josh again for a follow-up interview. Ruby flirts with Josh and they share a kiss. Josh gets back with his girlfriend Amber Turner, who becomes jealous of Ruby. Amber tells Ruby to back off, but Ruby replies that she is not interested in Josh, but other people are. Ruby later explains that Josh's fans need to feel that they have a chance with him and having a girlfriend will not suit his profile. Ruby briefly becomes Josh's manager and gets him a number of sponsorship deals. Josh later tells Ruby that he no longer requires her help.
27 November	Peter Slattery	Nicholas Stribakos	Peter is a developer working with Paul Robinson.
28 November–3 February 2014	Elliott Holmes	Ryder Smyth	Elliott is Jacob Holmes's son. His mother died shortly after giving birth to him and Jacob had to raise Elliott alone. Jacob leaves Elliott with Sonya Mitchell and takes off. Elliott becomes ill and Sonya and her husband, Toadfish Rebecchi, take him to the hospital. Jacob returns shortly afterwards to care for his son. A few weeks later, Jacob's in-laws challenge Jacob for custody of Elliott. Jacob decides to move closer to his in-laws and share custody of Elliott.
