= Chris Pappas (Neighbours) =

Fictional character in Neighbours

- Neighbours character
- Portrayed by: James Mason
- Duration: 2010–2015, 2022
- First appearance: 25 February 2010
- Last appearance: 28 July 2022
- Introduced by: Susan Bower (2010); Jason Herbison (2022)
In-universe information
- Occupation: Student; Lifeguard; Gym assistant; Mechanic; Trainee hotel manager
- Father: George Pappas
- Mother: Patricia Pappas
- Daughters: Annie Robinson-Pappas
- Grandmothers: Koula Pappas

Chris Pappas is a fictional character from the Australian soap opera Neighbours, played by James Mason. Mason originally read for the role of Andrew Robinson, before he was called back to audition for Chris three days later. He was told during the audition that the character would be gay. He began filming his first scenes in October 2009, and he made his first appearance during the episode broadcast on 25 February 2010. Executive producer Susan Bower said the character was created because of requests from young viewers in the Neighbours website's online forums. The character's sexuality storyline was also based on the real life experiences of the show's writers. Chris became the first prominent, regular male homosexual character in the show's twenty-five-year history. He was the second ongoing homosexual character overall, following Lana Crawford's (Bridget Neval) introduction in 2004.

Chris is introduced as a high school student, who befriends the soap's other teen characters and becomes captain of the school's basketball team. He briefly dates Summer Hoyland (Jordy Lucas), before revealing that he is gay. Chris struggles with his sexuality and the reactions of his friends, family and teammates. Writers explored the issue of homophobia when Chris is confronted by a homophobic customer while working at the local garage. The character was given a love interest in nurse Aidan Foster (Bobby Morley), and they formed Neighbours' first gay couple. Chris was central to a coward punch storyline in 2014, which was a topical issue in Australia at the time. Producers also established a relationship between him and Nate Kinski (Meyne Wyatt), and he fathered a child with his friend Lucy Robinson (Melissa Bell), shortly before his exit which aired on 27 March 2015. He made a cameo appearance on 6 November 2015 and reprised his role for the show's final episodes in 2022.

Bower expected Chris's coming out storyline to receive criticism and some media commentators called it "an obvious ratings grab". Mason and the show's script producer defended the storyline, saying that it was not a ploy to boost ratings and that it explored how Chris's coming out affected the people around him. Television critics and LGBT websites have given the character and his storyline development a positive reception. In 2012, Mason earned a nomination for the Logie Award for Most Popular New Male Talent.

== Creation and casting ==
Neighbours' executive producer Susan Bower said the creation of the character and his storyline was a result of requests from young viewers in the Neighbours website forums. Bower said that Chris's coming out storyline was also based on the real life experiences of the shows writers.

Mason's agent got him an audition with Neighbours and he originally read for the role of Andrew Robinson. The part was given to Jordan Patrick Smith, but an offer to play the role of Chris arrived three days later. Mason told Matt Akersten of SameSame that he was okay with knowing Chris would be gay. The character is Mason's first major television role. He began filming his first scenes in October 2009, before making his on-screen debut in February 2010. Bower later revealed that two-thirds of the boys who auditioned for the role of Chris backed out when they discovered the character was gay, which she said was "disappointing, but not surprising." Mason said that he was "really excited to get an opportunity like this" and added the writers had helped him out as the script was coming straight from their experiences. Bower praised Mason, saying that he "does a wonderful job."

In October 2010, the ATV News Network reported that the Neighbours writers and producers were unsure how to keep Chris connected to Ramsay Street. ATV said that the writer were "stumped" as to what to do with the character and his story. At the time, Mason was still filming for the show, but ATV reported that it was not known if he would be given a new contract. However, in January 2011, a Network Ten spokesperson told SX News that Mason's role would be expanded from April and he and Chris will get more screen time. Chris will be seen taking on "issues that every gay teenager does." On becoming a regular cast member, Mason told Channel 5, "I love it. The more time I spend on Neighbours, the more I feel part of the show. And I'm learning all the time. The thing about this industry is it's very hard to find stable work, so to have stability, I'm extremely grateful."

== Development ==
=== Coming out ===
Neighbours had featured a few short-term or minor male gay characters before for plot points or small story arcs, but Chris was the first male gay character to be given a prominent role. The first minor male gay characters to appear were Andrew MacKenzie (John Morris) and Alf Taylor (Frank Bren) in 1994. The following year a gay schoolteacher, Andrew Watson (Chris Uhlman), became the victim of a dismissal campaign by his pupils. Hairdresser Gino Esposito (Shane McNamara) was often hinted at being gay.

Mason has said that there have been a few hints about Chris's sexuality along the way and in August 2010, Chris finally revealed that he is gay to his girlfriend, Summer. TV Week described Chris as being "deeply conflicted" over his decision to tell her about his sexuality. Mason said "It's hard for Chris because he has a girlfriend who he's been with for some time. To try and tell someone in this situation would be really difficult". Summer initially takes the news well and plays it down, but when fellow student Natasha Williams (Valentina Novakovic) discovers that one of her classmates is gay, she goes out of her way to find out who it is and expose them. Mason said that she does not realise that "what she sees as a game is someone else's life".

Mason has said he was nervous about filming Chris's coming out. Describing the scene, he said "I did have to stand up in front a group of people and tell them [as my character], I was gay. That was a little intimidating". The actor felt that the storyline had been handled in a realistic manner and said that it shows that coming out is a difficult thing to do. Mason also spoke to a friend about his coming out experience to gain information about how long it took him to come out and how people reacted. The storyline follows Chris's struggle with his sexuality and depicts the reactions of his friends and family. It also deals with the issue of homophobia in sport. The Australian gay and lesbian newspaper, SX News said "Chris is the captain of the school basketball team, but once word he's gay gets out to the other teams it turns nasty for him".

Previous same-sex storylines in the show had led to criticism from conservative groups. Bower has said that she expects this storyline to come under fire, saying "I do believe homophobia is still alive and well, and I have no doubt that we will get complaints about it". Australian LGBT website SameSame said the story had attracted attention from some media commentators, who called it "an obvious ratings grab and an attempt to out-gay rival soap, Home and Away". However, script producer, Emma Steele defended the storyline and said that it is not a "ploy to grab ratings". Steele said that she is "particularly proud" of the way Chris's storyline had been handled and she added "It was something we wanted to do for a while because it's a story that affects so many people and in so many different ways. It wasn't just Chris's story. I think it's interesting to see how [his sexuality] affected his friends and his relationships with them too".

Mason said he hoped that his storyline would "draw in viewers in a responsible way" and the feedback would stay positive. Mason added that he would like to see Chris happy in the future and hopes the viewers will warm to him. He added "I know it's quite a sensitive topic, but I think the difference between his and the last encounters they've had is that we're looking more in-depth into more than just a "gay kiss". We go more into the relationships, how it affects people around". Steele backed this up, saying "We wanted gay to be part of Chris's character, not Chris to be the gay character. He's not your typical gay stereotype that some TV shows like to play up. He's on the basketball team, he's had a girlfriend for a time, and I think the show does a good job of portraying the way his character is discovering who he really is".

=== Relationship with Aidan Foster ===
"As actors, it is very challenging and exciting at the some time, and because of this, we have developed a connection. We're rapt that the characters are going down this path and based on the feedback I've had to Chris coming out, I think viewers are going to like why the relationship unfolds. Well, I hope they do."

— Mason on working with Bobby Morley.

In October 2010, Mason stated that a romantic interest for Chris could be introduced in the future. He said that it was not confirmed, but there was a chance that Chris would find someone. Mason admitted that he would find it "awkward" if he had to perform a male kissing scene. The following year, Mason revealed that the writers had plans for a romance for Chris on their radar and a few weeks later it was announced that Bobby Morley had joined the cast as Aidan Foster, a love interest for Chris. Aidan and Chris formed the serial's first gay couple. Bower called the storyline "a natural progression" for Chris, noting that he needed to meet someone at some stage. Bower told Daniel Kilkelly of Digital Spy that Chris's romance will be handled in a sensitive way and will be treated within the character. She explained "Chris is a naturally shy person – he is not a person who either flaunts his sexuality or his heart. So it will be done according to that character. And it may not be a full-on relationship. The character that Bob is playing is older and further down the track with his relationship testing, so it will be a relationship story rather than a gay male romance." Mason said that Chris and Aidan's relationship would have a slow build up.

Chris meets Aidan when he is brought into the hospital following a "vicious beating". Aidan provides a source of kindness and support for Chris. He later takes his car to the local garage to be serviced and flirts with Chris, who is initially unaware of what is going on. Lucas Fitzgerald (Scott Major) attempts to help Chris by asking Aidan if he is gay or straight, which leads to embarrassment for them all. The appearance of Chris's father, George (Lliam Amor), makes the situation worse and when Aidan asks Chris out for a drink, he turns him down. Mason told an Inside Soap writer "George is only just starting to accept that his son is gay, so when Aidan invites Chris for a drink, Chris turns him down out of fear of what his dad will think." Chris becomes intrigued by Aidan, but he also unsure what to do as he has never had a boyfriend before and it is all new to him. Natasha urges Chris to "face his fears" and she decides to play matchmaker at a barbecue they are all attending. Chris bonds with Aidan, but he thinks he missed his chance when Aidan goes on a date with someone else. Mason revealed that this leads to some new tension between the characters.

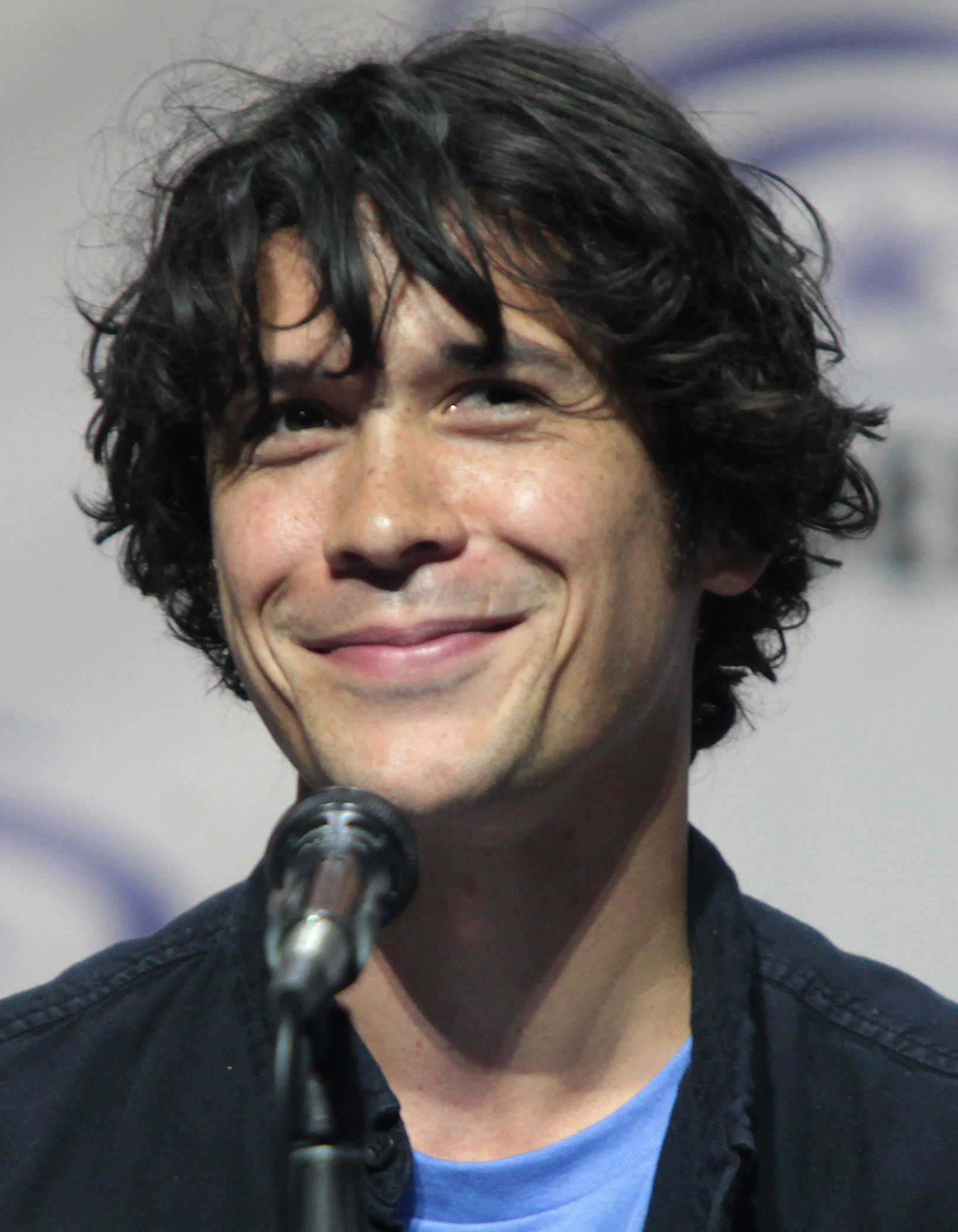
Chris and Aiden (Morley pictured) formed the show's first male gay couple.

Aidan and Chris later arrange a date, which turns into "a complete disaster". Chris is initially anxious and on edge, until he realises Aidan is having fun and he relaxes. However, Natasha then calls Chris to help with a problem and he has to leave Aidan, who assumes Chris has set the whole thing up to get out of the date. Aidan and Chris go out on another date, which marks the beginning of their relationship and Neighbours' first ever gay couple. On 9 April 2012, Aidan and Chris shared their first on-screen kiss. The couple, who had not shown any sign of physical affection until that point, shared "a rather passionate embrace" during a house party. Morley told TV Week's Andrew Mercado that Chris and Aidan share the intimate moment as any other couple would do. Morley thought the kiss was just as awkward as any other kiss he had previously performed, but he and Mason spent a lot of time and effort into getting it right for their characters. Chris and Aidan's kiss marked the serial's first male gay kiss in its twenty-seven-year history. Bower had previously promised that it would not be "sensationalist or token" and the low-key scene earned praise from viewers on social networking sites.

Morley took a break from Neighbours in mid-2012, which led the writers to improvise an on-screen break up for Aidan and Chris. The break up occurs after Aidan learns Chris has not told his parents that they are in a relationship. Mason said that Chris is fine with his friends knowing about his relationship, but it is different story when it comes to his parents. His father has not always made things easy for him in the past, so he does not give him and his mother a chance to get to know Aidan. When Chris's parents throw him a birthday party at Lassiters Lake, he decides not to invite Aidan. However, Aidan learns about the party from Andrew and he feels "hurt and humiliated" by Chris's actions, so he ends their relationship. Mason said, "That's when the gravity of the situation hits Chris, and he's left in shock. He thinks, 'How did it come to this?'. Things really seemed to be falling into place with Aidan." Chris then learns that his parents would have accepted the relationship and he realises that he has lost Aidan due to an assumption.

Chris and Aidan get back together, but after a few weeks, Chris breaks up with Aidan for good. Chris ends the relationship over Aidan's dishonesty. Chris learns that he has agreed to keep Andrew's epilepsy diagnosis a secret and he has also been suspended from the hospital. When Aidan gets into a fight and hides it, Chris becomes "exasperated enough" to break up with him. Mason said Chris still loved Aidan, so it was tough on them both. Aidan makes a "desperate suggestion" that they move in together, but Chris realises that it would be a bad idea. Mason stated, "Chris is a pretty happy-go-lucky guy, so I don't think he'll be wallowing in self-pity for long." He added that he would miss Morley, as he had enjoyed working with him during the storyline.

=== Homophobia and attack ===
A homophobia storyline was implemented for the character in September 2011, when Chris meets Warren Burrell (Tony Rickards), a homophobic customer at the garage. Warren makes his prejudice against gay people clear to Chris, which leaves him unsure how to respond, as he has never met an adult who speaks about gay people in the way Warren does. Chris tells his boss, Lucas Fitzgerald, about Warren, but he is disappointed when Lucas does not do anything about it. Of Chris's situation, Mason explained "It was very confronting for him. And because the guy wasn't pointing his remarks directly at Chris, Lucas didn't understand why Chris was so offended. At first, he didn't have an appreciation of how deep those comments hurt Chris." The storyline divided the opinions of viewers with some understanding why Lucas would not want to confront Warren, while others were on Chris's side. Mason was pleased that the audience was discussing the storyline and he admitted to appreciating both sides of the conversation. He said, "Lucas wasn't there when the customer was saying these things, so he didn't understand Chris's point of view. However, as the story went along, we saw Lucas change and his respect for Chris grew." Mason added the storyline was about showing understanding for where a person is coming from and being willing to change your ideas.

Two months later, Warren returns to the garage and Lucas shows his support for Chris by defending him. Chris soon meets and befriends Warren's son, Blake Burrell (Oliver Edwin). When Warren learns they are friends, he decides to put a stop to the situation. Warren threatens to kill Chris unless he stops spending time with Blake. Mason thought it was a shame that Chris and Blake could not continue their friendship because of Warren and his views. It soon becomes clear someone is spying on Chris, but whether it is Warren or someone else is not clear. Mason added something big would happen, which might not end well for Chris. Shortly after, Chris is beaten unconsciousness while he is working alone at the garage. Warren is the initial suspect, as he was the last customer at the garage before the attack. Speaking to an Inside Soap columnist, Mason revealed that the scenes were filmed in such a "suspenseful way" that the audience does not see who the attacker is. They see someone reach for a wrench in the dark and come up behind Chris and strike him. Lucas finds Chris on the ground, and at the hospital, he is treated for cuts, bruises, painful ribs and trauma from being kicked around. The character was shown to be reluctant to report the attack to the police, although he is certain that Warren was responsible. Mason told the columnist, "Chris is embarrassed to admit that he was bashed for being gay." Lucas does some investigating and realises that Warren may not have been the assailant. He thinks that Chris was attacked as a warning to himself over plans for a future development on the site of the garage.

=== Scotty Boland ===
Shortly after Georgia Brooks's (Saskia Hampele) boyfriend Scotty Boland (Rhys Uhlich) was introduced, Chris is shocked to realise that Scotty "may have a romantic interest in him." During a charity camp-out, which has been organised by Georgia, Scotty visits Chris's tent during the night and says something that makes Chris believe he is making a romantic advance towards him. Mason commented that the storyline has "a serious side" because everyone believes Scotty is straight, especially his girlfriend. He also said that there would be some funny moments in the lead up to the big revelation. Not long after the camp-out incident, Scotty lets his attraction to Chris get the better of him and he tries to kiss Chris. Uhlich explained that "There's no mistaking this as Scotty hitting on Chris. He's really put it out there now, but Chris doesn't go for it. So he kicks Scotty out of the house, but even then Scotty doesn't realise what the kiss means." A shocked Chris then confides in his housemate Kyle Canning (Chris Milligan) about the kiss and they decide that they need to tell Georgia. However, they soon learn that Scotty has proposed to Georgia and decide to remain silent to stop her from having her heart broken.

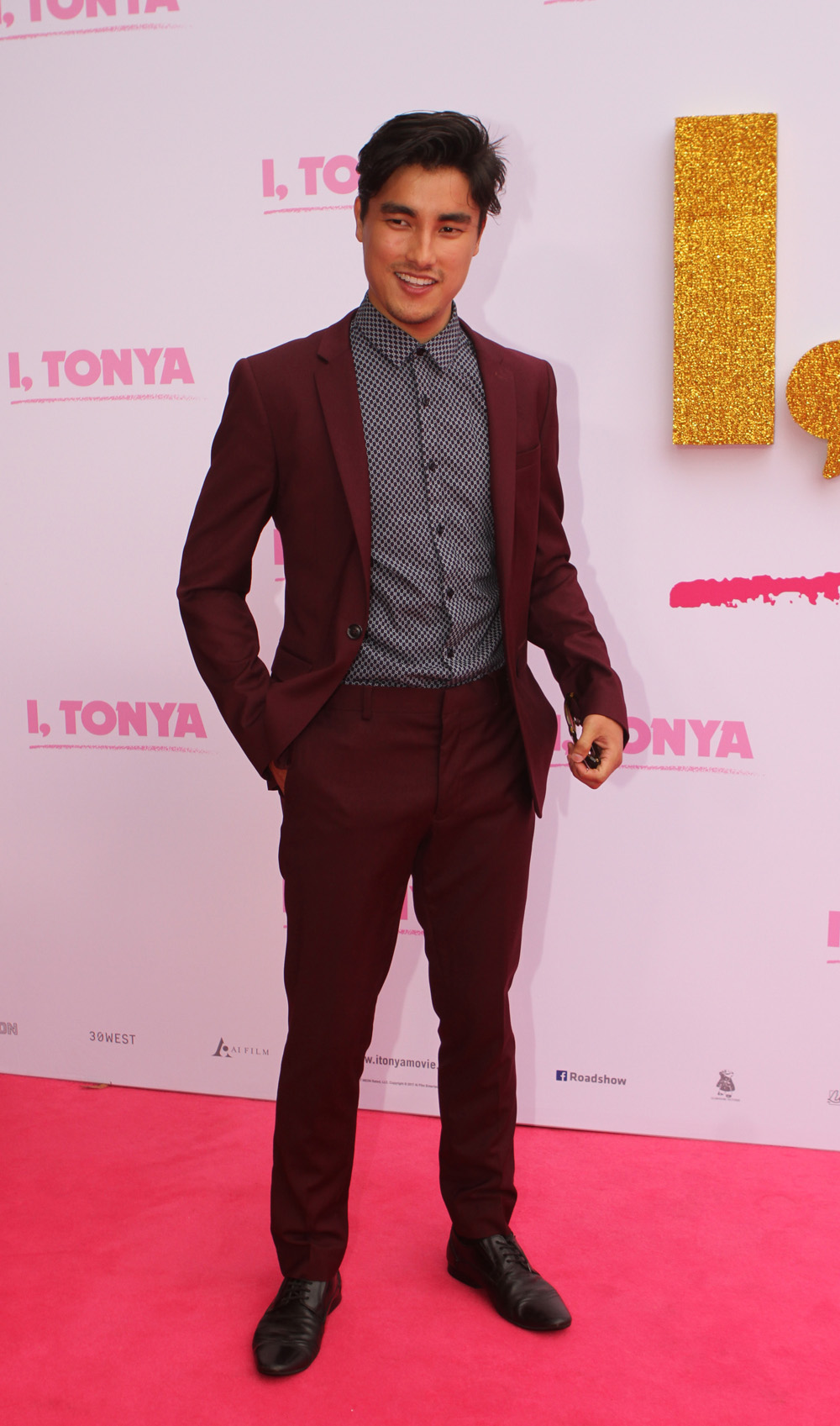
Hudson Walsh, played by Remy Hii (pictured), became Chris's new love interest in 2013.

=== Relationship with Hudson Walsh ===
In mid-2013, a new love interest for Chris was introduced in the form of competitive swimmer Hudson Walsh (Remy Hii). Chris is initially cautious about dating Hudson so soon after Aidan. Hii commented, "Chris is trying to keep his cards close to his chest, but by the same token, Hudson is also a new guy to this neighbourhood and isn't quite sure who he can be open to and show his true colours to." Chris ends their potential relationship after discovering that Hudson has been taking steroids to help him train. But then Hudson tells him that he has stopped taking the steroids and asks for a second chance. Mason said Chris is still fragile after Aidan and he does not want to get hurt, so he is "pretty hard" on Hudson, but neither one of them are happy that things between them have ended so soon. When Chris comes home to find Hudson in his house, he thinks Hudson broke in and they argue, until Kyle tells him he let Hudson in. Chris suddenly realises how much Hudson means to him and apologises. The couple have a romantic dinner and they kiss for the first time.

=== Coward punch ===
In September 2014, Chris was the focus of a coward punch storyline. During Kyle and Georgia's joint bucks and hen night, Chris was forced to eject a drunk Josh Willis (Harley Bonner) from The Waterhole when he caused a scene. Shortly after, Josh returned and hit Chris with a coward punch, causing him to fall and hit his head on a rock. Kyle and Georgia found Chris unconscious and he was rushed to hospital in a critical condition. Mason was pleased to be given the storyline, explaining that it was a topical issue in Australia at the time. He said "The whole moral of the story is that one little mistake can have really dire consequences. I like to think that we can use this story to really educate people and get the word out there that this is something really serious that we're battling against at the moment." Mason thought that Chris might be able to forgive Josh in the future, but it would be "a long process", and he would have to deal with the fact that his life had changed forever due to the attack first. Mason added that Chris would have difficulties accepting that someone like Josh attacked him.

Chris faced further trouble when he suffered a sudden seizure. Mason explained that many things had changed for Chris since the attack and the seizure compounded his fear that he will be struggling for the rest of his life. Chris was also worried that he had developed epilepsy like Andrew did, but doctors informed him that the seizure was a temporary symptom of his brain injury. Chris was kept in hospital overnight, which meant his romantic plans with his partner Nate Kinski (Meyne Wyatt) were put on hold. However, Nate turned up at the hospital and Mason said, "The two of them just cuddle, and for the first time Chris realises this is a serious relationship." Nate then told Chris he loved him for the first time.

=== Departure and return ===
After five years in the role, Mason decided to leave Neighbours and Chris departed on 27 March 2015. Chris's exit storyline saw him decide to be a full-time father to his child with Lucy Robinson (Melissa Bell), and move to New York. When Nate told Chris that he did not want to move to New York, they decided to end their relationship. Wyatt commented "It's been a long time coming. Chris has decided that he wants to go to New York and Nate is staying in Erinsborough." Chris departed Erinsborough with Lucy. On 6 November 2015, Chris and Lucy made a cameo appearance to announce the birth of their daughter.

On 7 May 2022, Dan Seddon of Digital Spy reported that Mason was reprising his role for the show's final episodes to be broadcast later in the year.

== Storylines ==
After being scammed by Andrew Robinson and Harry Ramsay into buying a manual on how to win a girlfriend, Chris befriends them and Summer Hoyland. Chris joins the basketball team and is later elected captain. He also begins dating Summer, which makes Harry jealous. Andrew gets Chris fired from his job as a lifeguard at the local swimming pool when he throws a party that gets out of control. To make things up to Chris, Andrew helps him get a job at the local gym. Summer becomes annoyed when Chris forgives Andrew so easily and then allows himself to be influenced by him into skipping school. Chris also ends up in a fight with Kyle Canning when he defends Andrew. Michael Williams (Sandy Winton) becomes concerned about Chris's behaviour and Chris later tells him he is confused about Andrew, leading Michael to realise Chris is gay. When Michael's daughter, Natasha, spreads a rumour that a Year 11 student is gay, several people believe it is Summer. The rumours start to affect Chris and he comes out to his class. When Andrew realises Chris has feelings for him and is annoyed.

Chris is suspended from school when he gets into a fight with a rival basketball captain. When his parents find out about the fight and that he is gay, they throw Chris out and he stays with Summer. She later breaks down and reveals that she is struggling with his sexuality. Chris reassures her that it is not her fault he is gay and their friendship becomes stronger. Chris befriends Natasha and helps her and Summer to make up when they fall out. After receiving lower grades than expected, Chris reconsiders attending university. He gets a job at Fitzgerald Motors, upsetting his father, George, who wants him to go to university. To keep George happy, Chris begins attending TAFE. A customer, Warren Burrell, makes derogatory comments about gay people and makes Chris feel uncomfortable. Warren's son, Blake, befriends Chris and apologises for his father. Warren witnesses them playing pool and warns Chris to stay away from Blake. Chris is later attacked while working and Lucas takes him to the hospital, but Chris leaves before getting his x-rays. He later collapses and Rhys Lawson has to perform emergency surgery to get Chris breathing again.

Nurse Aidan Foster is assigned to look after Chris. Chris later turns down Aidan's offer of a drink; but Natasha encourages him to spend time with Aidan. Chris becomes jealous when Aidan goes on a date with another guy and eventually manages to ask Aidan out. Chris and Aidan begin dating. Aidan encourages Chris to tell his parents about them, but Chris admits that he is struggling to and worries how his father will react. Chris chooses not to invite Aidan to his birthday party, which is hosted by his family, and Aidan breaks up with him. Chris tells his parents about his relationship and they assure him that they would have accepted it. During a car journey to the city, Chris and his friends find Sophie Ramsay (Kaiya Jones) hiding in the boot of his car. Andrew pressures Chris into allowing Sophie to sit on Summer's lap. An argument between Andrew and Natasha breaks out and when Andrew bumps Chris's arm, he loses control of the car and crashes. Chris blames himself for the accident and Andrew's father, Paul (Stefan Dennis), tries to sue him. The police fine Chris and he loses his license for six months. Chris and Aidan get back together and Chris moves into 26 Ramsay Street.

Chris becomes frustrated with Aidan when he does not confide in him about his feelings or accept help from him. When Aidan goes back on his promise to be more open and honest, Chris breaks up with him. Chris suffers a flashback to the crash and damages a Lassiter's car. Ralphie Mahone (Daniel Bowden) fixes the car and in return, he asks Chris to rework some vehicles for him. Chris comes clean to Lucas, who calls the police. Ralphie threatens Chris, but Mason Turner (Taylor Glockner) intervenes and gets rid of Ralphie. Georgia Brooks's boyfriend, Scotty, makes sexual advances towards Chris. When Georgia finds out, she starts avoiding Chris, but they later make up. Chris befriends Amber Turner (Jenna Rosenow) when he sees she is being bullied. Amber develops a crush on Chris and he is forced to tell her that nothing will ever happen between them. Chris begins dating competitive swimmer Hudson Walsh (Remy Hii). Chris breaks up with Hudson when he learns that he is taking performance-enhancing drugs. Chris and Hudson later get back together. Hudson confesses to running down Amber's ex-boyfriend Robbo Slade (Aaron Jakubenko). He apologises to Chris and then refuses to see him again.

When he has trouble sleeping, Chris gets a prescription for sleeping pills. Kyle and his grandmother, Sheila (Colette Mann), later find Chris collapsed in the garden and Karl tells Chris to stop taking the sleeping pills. Chris ignores his advice and starts sleepwalking. Chris also has a series of one-night stands and gets two warnings at work from his new boss, Danni Ferguson (Laura McIntosh). Chris is arrested when he punches Josh Willis, who spoke to a journalist about Chris and Hudson's relationship. Kate Ramsay (Ashleigh Brewer) drives Chris to the prison, so he can see Hudson and sort things out. Hudson tells Chris that he cut off contact as he needed time to prepare himself for prison. Chris asks Hudson to give their relationship another go and he agrees. Chris keeps Hudson's incarceration a secret from his parents, so he is angered when Sonya Rebecchi (Eve Morey) inadvertently reveals his secret to his mother, Patricia (Katerina Kotsonis). When Patricia is later arrested for theft, Chris learns that she is a gambling addict and Sonya knew.

Chris's knee is badly injured when Danni's ex-boyfriend Stephen Montague (Damian Hill) attacks him. He undergoes surgery and the flirts with nurse Will Dempier (Christian Heath) when he suffers a reaction to the analgesic. Chris becomes frustrated when Hudson is not there for him, and questions how he can be in a relationship and feel so alone. He decides to ask Will out for a drink, but later cancels. Chris collapses due to complications from his surgery and is readmitted to hospital. He apologises to Will for cancelling on him and then tells him about Hudson. During Chris's next visit to Hudson, he appears distracted and when Hudson asks him if he is seeing someone else, Chris hesitates and Hudson breaks up with him. Chris tells Hudson about Will and how lonely he is. Hudson does not want Chris to date him out of guilt, and they say goodbye. Chris spends some time with Will and they begin dating, but the relationship ends when Will's dog, Napoleon, bites Kyle's dog Bossy, and Will refuses to accept responsibility or apologise.

Chris befriends Lucy Robinson (Melissa Bell) and she asks him to father her child, to which Chris replies that he needs time to decide. Chris meets Nate Kinski and they arrange to go a picnic for their first date. Chris is shocked when Nate attacks a drunk guy for harassing Paige Smith (Olympia Valance), but Susan Kennedy (Jackie Woodburne) convinces him to give Nate a second chance. When Chris asks Nate to open up about his time in the army and Afghanistan, Nate gets physical with him. Nate promises that it will not happen again and asks Chris not to push him about opening up until he is ready. During Georgia and Kyle's joint hen and bucks night, Chris is punched by an unseen assailant and he hits his head. Kyle and Georgia find him and he is rushed to hospital, and placed in an induced coma. Josh later confesses to punching Chris. When Chris wakes up, he struggles to remember words and his right side is weakened. Chris is allowed leave from the hospital to attend Georgia and Kyle's wedding. After he is discharged from hospital, Nate becomes Chris's carer. Chris decides to return to work at the garage but is unable to do the work and is sent home. Chris later suffers a seizure and is admitted to hospital. He is forced to quit his job as he can no longer handle the workload due to his injuries. Josh's mother, Terese (Rebekah Elmaloglou), offers Chris a job as a trainee manager at Lassiter's Hotel, which Nate persuades him to accept.

Lucy returns and Chris rejects her offer of being father to her child when Nate confesses he does not want children; however, Chris changes his mind when Nate supports him. Nate later helps Chris and Lucy see that they need to think the idea through more thoroughly, and they draw up a contract detailing how their child will be raised. When they learn that they are both carriers of spinal muscular atrophy, Chris tells Lucy that she should find another donor. But when Chris sees how down Lucy is, he changes his mind and they go ahead with the insemination. A couple of weeks later, Lucy calls Chris to tell him that she is pregnant. Chris plans to visit New York for the scan, but Nate confesses he is banned from the States for overstaying his visa there previously. Toadfish Rebecchi (Ryan Moloney) agrees to help lift the ban, but Nate misses a meeting and Chris accuses him of not taking it seriously. Lucy returns for a visit and Chris decides he wants to split his time between Erinsborough and New York when the baby comes, although Nate is against this idea. Nate realises that they want different things, and they break-up. Chris then decides to move to New York with Lucy and leaves after a farewell party at The Waterhole. A few months later, Amber contacts Chris and Lucy via video call after learning that they have had a daughter. Chris and Lucy introduce her to Annie, and Chris asks Amber to say hello to Nate for him.

== Reception ==
For his portrayal of Chris, Mason was nominated for the Most Popular New Male Talent accolade at the 2012 Logie Awards. In 2014, Mason won the Soap Extra Award for Most Topical Storyline for Chris's coward punch storyline with Josh Willis. The character's inclusion in Neighbours and his storyline has received a positive reaction from the public, television critics and LGBT websites. Chris's coming out episode, which was broadcast on 10 August 2010, was seen by 679,000 viewers in Australia. David Knox of Citysearch Melbourne said that the inclusion of Chris in the show is "a positive step with its juvenile audience". Knox added that following the "gay kiss scandal" on Home and Away, "the test for Neighbours will be not just the coming out, but whether he remains in the show after this storyline subsides". Of Chris, SX News said "One could simply dismiss the gay character as simply just another plot line, but there's no denying its significance, especially with a show as enduring and mainstream as Neighbours. If anything, it's a small reflection of the changing attitudes in society". They also praised Neighbours for focusing on Chris's coming out and the issue of homophobia, instead of letting Chris "explode out of the closet and leave Ramsay Street glittering in sequins".

The ATV News Network said the Chris's coming out should be praised for the way it has been handled. They added that the decision to play it out at a school would have viewers in a similar situation identifying with the storyline. Alan McKee, a university film and television professor, said that usually subscription television channels take risks in portraying storylines like Chris's. He added "Commercial TV is not about risk taking, it is about entertainment for the broadest possible audience. But attitudes have changed and commercial networks like to reflect that". Holy Soap said Chris's most memorable moment was "Announcing to his entire class that he was gay." Anthony D. Langford from website, AfterElton said he found it "humorous" that Neighbours emphasizes what a gentleman Chris is compared to Andrew. He said "It's like they're almost saying if you're a nice guy who's not all over your girlfriend you must be gay. But on television that's usually the case". Langford hoped that Chris would not vanish and that he would not be relegated to monitoring the relationship between Andrew and Summer and not having a romance of his own.

Langford later said that Neighbours is doing a "fairly decent job" with Chris's coming out story. He wished that viewers got to see more of Chris's thoughts and feelings and less of how his situation affected the people around him. Langford added "I do like that Chris isn't a perfect kid. Many shows tend to make gay teens near saints. Instead, he's a fairly average kid who makes mistakes and messes up, like starting a fight at a basketball game. In July 2011, Langford revealed that he had seen some comments from people thinking that Lucas and Chris should be paired up. He opined that there is not a hint of romance between the two and wondered why people assumed that if a gay character shares a scene with another guy, they must get together. Langford revealed that he liked Chris and Lucas's mentor and mentee relationship as it is. The writer also commented on the introduction of Chris's father and said that he was "delighted" that Chris was finally getting his own drama, that was "pretty realistic." He added "It's nice to see the father/son dynamic play out. I have the feeling that a lot of Chris's dad's issues stem from the fact that his son is gay and I hope the show will delve into those unresoved issues."

Sarah Ellis writing for Inside Soap said "I'd love to see Chris with a boyfriend – he's the nicest guy in Erinsborough!" In 2011, Mason revealed that he has had a positive reaction to his character from viewers and he has been receiving mail from people who have had similar experiences, who appreciate what Neighbours is doing. He added "What's interesting is that a lot of feedback has been about the fact the character's coming out wasn't a "warm and fuzzy" experience, that there were rough spots. They appreciated the authenticity of the story, and I think that comes from the character and storylines being based on other people's real life experiences." Cameron Adams of the Herald Sun branded Chris Erinsborough's token gay. He added "Good on Neighbours for not having their gay character flouncing around in a midriff top listening to Britney Spears." Inside Soap's staff said that they could not wait to see how Chris would get on with Aidan. They added that it was "high time he had a boyfriend". Of the Chris and Scotty storyline, Melinda Houston from The Sun-Herald wrote "Good on Neighbours for not just having an ongoing gay character but using him to explore some interesting issues.
