= Georgia Brooks =

Fictional character

- Neighbours character
- Portrayed by: Saskia Hampele
- Duration: 2012–2016
- First appearance: 5 October 2012
- Last appearance: 4 April 2016
- Introduced by: Richard Jasek (2012); Jason Herbison (2016)
- Spin-off appearances: Neighbours vs Zombies (2014)
In-universe information
- Occupation: Nurse
- Father: Patto Brooks
- Mother: Rhonda Brooks
- Husband: Kyle Canning (2014–2019)
- Aunts: Angie Rebecchi
- First cousins: Toadie Rebecchi; Gemma Reeves
- Other relatives: Nell Rebecchi; Callum Jones

Georgia Brooks is a fictional character from the Australian soap opera Neighbours, played by Saskia Hampele. The actress was travelling through Kakadu with her boyfriend when she received a call from her agent about a regular role on Neighbours. Hampele was then asked to film an audition for the show and she said that she could not turn down the opportunity to play Georgia. She also believed that she was meant to get the part because the character was originally called Daisy, a nickname her boyfriend and friends call her. Hampele made her first screen appearance as Georgia during the episode broadcast on 5 October 2012. Hampele decided to leave the show in 2015 to pursue new acting opportunities, and Georgia made her departure in May of that year. She later returned for guest appearances in August 2015 and April 2016.

Georgia was introduced to Neighbours as the cousin of established character Toadfish Rebecchi (Ryan Moloney) and she soon moved in with him and his partner, Sonya (Eve Morey). Georgia is a graduate nurse from the country. Hampele stated that she is a positive person, while writers for TV Week and Soap World described her as being "bubbly" and "vivacious". When Georgia's childhood sweetheart, Scotty Boland (Rhys Uhlich), was introduced, she began questioning their relationship after developing feelings for Kyle Canning (Chris Milligan). After Georgia learned that Scotty was gay, she went on a downward spiral and briefly lost her job at the hospital due to a drugs scandal. Georgia later became engaged to Kyle, developed a singing career, had a miscarriage and a cancer scare.

== Casting ==
On 1 August 2012, it was announced that Hampele had joined the cast of Neighbours as Georgia Brooks, the cousin of established character, Toadfish Rebecchi (played by Ryan Moloney). While travelling with her boyfriend, Kayne Tremills, in Kakadu, Hampele received a call from her agent about a regular role on Neighbours. She was asked to record "an impromptu audition" for the show's producers and the actress noted that the Australian outback featured in the backdrop of her video was "a far cry from Ramsay Street". Hampele revealed that she could not turn down the opportunity to play Georgia and work in Melbourne, following a stint auditioning for shows in Los Angeles.

The actress thought that she was meant to get the part because the character was originally named Daisy, a nickname Tremills and her friends have given her. Hampele later told Erin McWhirter from TV Week that after a few weeks of filming, she felt part of the Neighbours family and she took an instant liking to Moloney. She explained "Ryan is absolutely lovely and I think because I came into the show as family. I took an instant liking to him and see him as an older brother. He's been able to show me the ropes a little bit." A day before she appeared on-screen, a video featuring Hampele receiving a tour of Erinsborough from cast members Alan Fletcher and Jackie Woodburne (Karl and Susan Kennedy) was released. Hampele made her first appearance as Georgia during the episode broadcast on 5 October 2012.

== Development ==
=== Characterisation ===
Moloney told a writer from MSN that Georgia would "stir things up" in Toadie's household. Shortly after she arrived, Georgia moved in with her cousin and his then pregnant partner, Sonya Mitchell (Eve Morey). Moloney quipped that she was another mouth to feed and the house was becoming a bit full what with the baby arriving too. Of how Georgia fits in, the actor explained "It looks as though she's annoying Sonya and she's going to be a bit of a pain in the neck, but then Sonya and her get on like a house on fire and it backfires on Toadie. He's stuck with someone who agrees with Sonya's hippy birthing ways. But it's lovely to have another member of the family on the street." A writer for Channel 5's Neighbours website also stated that as the cousin of Toadie, Georgia already had an established bloodline coming into the show. McWhirter revealed that Georgia is a graduate nurse and described her as being "bubbly", while a Soap World columnist called her "vivacious". Georgia is also a country girl. Hampele thought her character was a positive person and hoped that whatever happens during her storylines, she would not change completely.

Hampele later commented that she enjoyed playing Georgia, explaining "life keeps throwing some pretty heavy stuff her way, but she always maintains her integrity and optimism, even if it gets challenged along the way. She's a great role model - she's caring, loving, naive - but can also be strong, independent and fearless when she needs to be." The actress added that Georgia is the type of person she would befriend.

=== Love triangle ===
Georgia's childhood sweetheart, Scotty Boland (Rhys Uhlich), was introduced in December 2012. Scotty is a country farmer who decides to follow Georgia to Erinsborough. David Knox from TV Tonight commented that Scotty was "not impressed" that his girlfriend had left Birregurra. Georgia is happy to see Scotty, but starts to realise that they have less in common with each other that she first thought. Georgia then questions her relationship with Scotty when he fails to understand why her work is having an emotional impact on her. Instead Kyle Canning (Chris Milligan) gives Georgia the support she needs, leaving her with some questions about her future with Scotty. Georgia become torn between Kyle and Scotty. When she decides to spend the afternoon at a fundraising barbecue with Kyle, Georgia starts to feel guilty about ditching Scotty for the day and quickly leaves. Hampele told an Inside Soap columnist, "Kyle has definitely been a distraction for Georgia. She and Kyle spend the afternoon together raising funds for baby Patrick, and Georgia has a great time. That's when she realises there's an attraction." Georgia's hasty exit from the fundraiser causes Kyle to become confused and he thinks she has developed a crush on Rhys Lawson (Ben Barber).

Kyle believes that Georgia's feelings for Rhys will lead her to have her heart broken and he urges her to mend her relationship with Scotty, which leaves Georgia "gutted". Hampele quipped that Georgia likes Kyle and she thinks he feels the same way, so it comes as a blow to her. The actress continued that Georgia has been brought up to stand by her man, so her feelings about Scotty are conflicted. Kyle's grandmother later tells Rhys that Georgia fancies him, so he decides her to ask her out. However, a "bewildered" Georgia turns him down. Georgia and Kyle continue to hide their feelings for each other, but Georgia struggles to contain her jealously when Kyle begins dating Jana Noviac (Kyrie Capri). Georgia realises that her feelings for Kyle mean that her relationship with Scotty is over and she breaks up with him over the phone. When Kyle comes over to Georgia's place to fix the pool, she offers to put some sunscreen on his back and TV Week's Thomas Mitchell declared that "the electricity is off the grid!". However, Georgia's aunt, Angie Rebecchi (Lesley Baker), interrupts them. Milligan said "Kyle and Georgia have that sexual tension. They both know deep down that they have feelings for each other but something just isn't working in their favour yet."

Georgia and Scotty later get back together and Scotty comes to stay with her on Ramsay Street. Georgia is grateful when Scotty appears unaware of her attraction to Kyle. When Scotty suddenly proposes to Georgia, she accepts. She also scolds Kyle for being jealous when Scotty informs her that Kyle has been "mistreating" him. Scotty and Georgia plan to elope in secret, but before they can leave, Kyle reveals that Scotty made sexual advances towards Chris Pappas (James Mason). Georgia is initially unwilling to believe the story, until Scotty confirms he is gay. A Soap World columnist noted "Georgia is shattered to think that she missed all the signs throughout their eight-year relationship". Georgia is hurt further when Scotty abruptly leaves town without saying goodbye. Hampele revealed that Georgia cannot believe her first serious relationship has ended this way and she is frustrated that she did not get a chance to confront Scotty because his letter did not provide the answers that she needs. Georgia has also been left feeling like she was not good enough for Scotty and she becomes angry about that. Hampele added that moving forward, Georgia and Kyle would be a good match as they share similar outlooks on life and are both "a little kooky."

=== Downward spiral ===
In April 2013, it was announced that Georgia would become involved in a drugs scandal storyline. Following the revelation about Scotty's sexuality, Georgia goes on "a downward spiral" which begins affecting her personal and professional life. She swears off any future relationships with men and rejects her friend's attempts to console her. A Soap World reporter wrote that Georgia is "ashamed to be around anyone who knows her." Georgia avoids her own birthday celebrations and when she is treating Pete Clark (Paul Cousins) at the hospital, she is unaware that he is flirting with her. However, when she realises that Pete is interested in her, Georgia decides to go for a drink with him. When Pete rejects her kiss, she becomes even more embarrassed and starts suffering from insomnia. Georgia asks Karl Kennedy (Alan Fletcher) for some strong sleeping pills, but her behaviour concerns him and he later organises for Georgia to have some time off work. While she is at Charlie's, a conversation with Pete takes "a dark and potentially dangerous turn" when he offers her drugs.

When asked how she felt about the storyline, Hampele replied that she enjoyed it, especially as it meant that she got to explore another layer of her character's personality. When some drugs go missing from the hospital, Georgia is wrongly accused of taking them as she is responsible for the drug store. She realises that she left Pete alone with the keys to the store when he came into the hospital again, but struggles to admit that to anyone. During a search of Georgia's bag, sleeping pill prescriptions are found and she suspects Pete had something to do with them. When Georgia is forced to reveal the truth about her own drug use, she is shocked and devastated when she is fired from the hospital. Hampele told Kilkelly "It's going to be extremely difficult for her to get her job back, because it appears initially that she has broken every rule in the book. However, I think she has only touched the surface as a nurse and hospital settings provide some of the most interesting storylines, so I would definitely like to see her remain as a nurse." Kyle helps Georgia to clear her name when he finds the person behind the drugs theft. Georgia's reputation is restored and she is allowed to return to work.

=== Relationship with Kyle Canning ===
"I think that they're a really good match. I think they've done a really good job at just finding two characters who just work together. They share very similar values… They fall in love and I'd like to see a happily ever after for the couple."

— Hampele on Georgia and Kyle (2013)

Once Georgia's life settles down, she and Kyle start spending "quality time" with each other. When they believe their relationship is in a good place, Georgia and Kyle have sex for the first time. However, their happiness does not last for long when Georgia is offered an opportunity to work overseas. Milligan commented "Just when Kyle thinks they're making progress, Georgia springs this on him. He tried the long-distance thing with his ex, Jade, and it didn't work." As Georgia begins to struggle in the relationship, she breaks up with Kyle. He then realises that she needs to work through her issues with Scotty before she can truly move on and invites Scotty back to town. Georgia is shocked when Scotty turns up on her doorstep and Kyle leaves them alone to talk. The talk with Scotty helps Georgia to overcome her insecurities and she and Kyle make up.

Not long after Scotty's visit, Georgia and Kyle face their next challenge when Kyle is temporarily blinded during an eclipse. Hampele stated "Georgia has self-esteem issues because of her break-up with Scotty. Even though Kyle always tries to be there for her, she just keeps pushing him away. And then Kyle has this terrible accident and that puts a massive strain on both of them." Hampele said the scenes between Georgia and Kyle were challenging to film as she and Milligan could not make eye contact. She also found it difficult to have an "emotional response" with Milligan. Georgia and Kyle's relationship becomes so strained that they decide to take a break. Kyle then has a one-night stand with Georgia's best friend Kate Ramsay (Ashleigh Brewer). Hampele admitted that she would have preferred Georgia and Kyle to have been happy and stable in their relationship for a bit longer, before it is tested again. Georgia and Kyle become engaged when they both propose. Hampele told an Inside Soap reporter that as Georgia is an impulsive character, she thought it was perfect that she made the snap decision to propose to Kyle. However, instead of accepting straight away, Kyle leaves Georgia to go and get his grandmother's ring, so he can propose to her.

Georgia's cousin Gemma Reeves (Kathryn Beck) discovers Kate and Kyle's affair after hacking into Kate's email account and finding an unsent email from Kate to Kyle detailing their one-night stand. She places the email in a pile of congratulatory email messages at an engagement party thrown for Georgia and Kyle. Georgia then reads out the email from Kate. Realising that her best friend and boyfriend have betrayed her, a heartbroken Georgia flees the party. Hampele admitted that she was "a bit devastated" that the affair was revealed as she realised that she would not get to work with Brewer and Milligan as much in the future. Hampele also thought about how Georgia does not see Gemma's manipulation of her and put it down to Beck, who convinced her that nothing bad was happening in the background. Hampele explained that Georgia is devastated and shocked by Kate and Kyle's betrayal. She does not give them a chance to explain and is unsure whether they are even still continuing the affair. Georgia is "equally angry at them both" and decides to cut them out of her life. Georgia flees Erinsborough with Gem in the wake of her discovery. Their departure formed the 2013 cliffhanger as Gem leaves an unconscious Georgia in room filled with gas. Hampele called the storyline "the biggest" she had been part of since her arrival, adding "When the affair between Kate and Kyle was revealed, Georgia was devastated. They are two people she trusted – that were on her side and had her back."

=== Singing career ===
During an appearance on The Wright Stuff in May 2013 Hampele revealed that Georgia would be doing some singing in the show. She added that Georgia would perform with Karl's band The Right Prescription. Hampele found the singing storyline to be "quite challenging" and it was not something that she pushed. However, the producers received positive feedback and they continued to show Georgia singing. Georgia later writes and records a song called "Letting You Know", about her relationship with Kyle. Hampele got to record the song in real-life and it was later available to download. Singer and songwriter Amali Ward was introduced to the show as part of the storyline. With the drama between Georgia and Kyle, the storyline died down.

=== Pregnancy ===
In December 2013, a reporter for the Press Association announced that Georgia would be shocked to learn that she was pregnant with Kyle's child in the new year. The reporter added that Georgia would "struggle" with telling Kyle her news. While she is recovering from her heartbreak over Kate and Kyle, Georgia was "plagued with ill health", which she put down to stress. After taking a pregnancy test, which turned out to be positive, Georgia had mixed emotions. Hampele explained "Georgia is someone who's always wanted children, marriage and a home. She's always imagined Kyle would be the person she would do all those things with." Georgia initially decided to keep her pregnancy from Kyle because she felt that she could not trust him.

While suffering from severe morning sickness, Georgia collapsed during a gig at Charlie's, leading to Kyle discovering that she was pregnant. After keeping her distance from Kyle, Georgia began to "thaw" towards him and Hampele commented that it was because of her "hopeless romantic" side. However, when Georgia experienced some unusual pain and cramps, Kyle took her to the hospital and they learned that Georgia had suffered a miscarriage. Georgia and Kyle were "shattered" by the news and Hampele pointed out, "It's such a devastating loss. This baby was something they were really looking forward to."

=== Cancer scare ===
In August 2014, Georgia experienced a cancer scare. After she developed a sore throat, she got it checked out by Karl, who found a large lump. Georgia became concerned as there is a history of lung and throat cancer in her family. Georgia struggled to acknowledge the possibility of cancer and Hampele said, "It's very devastating for her. One of her biggest concerns is the thought of leaving Kyle behind. Also, she knows how much her mum's cancer diagnosis rocked her family." Kyle assured Georgia that she would be fine and persuaded her to have the surgery to remove the lump. Ahead of her surgery, Georgia began to feel nervous and wondered whether she was doing the right thing by having the lump removed. Hampele told an Inside Soap columnist that Georgia was nervous and worried about permanently losing her voice.

Georgia's surgery appeared to go well, but while she was in recovery, her health took a turn for the worse. Hampele explained, "when Georgia comes out of surgery, she can still talk, but she's told not to overuse her voice. However, the stitches in her throat rupture and she starts coughing up blood." Georgia was rushed back into theatre to repair her stitches and Karl tried to reassure her that everything would be okay. However, he later had to inform Georgia that she would probably not sing professionally again. Georgia then suspected that there might have been some misconduct from her surgeon Jessica Girdwood (Glenda Linscott) and when she realised Karl and Jessica were friends, she questioned whether Karl was covering up for his colleague.

=== Departure ===
On 18 May 2015, it was confirmed that Hampele had left Neighbours and had filmed her final scenes earlier in the year. Daniel Kilkelly from Digital Spy reported that the actress had moved to Los Angeles to pursue new career opportunities. Hampele later said that Georgia had been "a pleasure to play" and she was thankful for all the messages from fans expressing their love and support for her. Georgia's exit storyline saw her move to Germany with her mother, who had been diagnosed with cancer. Georgia found a research centre in the country that offered an effective treatment for the disease. Georgia departed Erinsborough after "an impromptu farewell" with Kyle and her friends on 27 May.

Two months later, it was revealed that Hampele had filmed some extra scenes which had yet to air. Georgia appeared via an online video call to Kyle. She later returned home, shortly after a man called Greg Keys (Ryan Faucett) revealed to Kyle that he was in love with her. A show spokesperson stated, "Kyle is on tenterhooks when Georgia finally arrives. She reassures him nothing physical happened between Greg and herself but admits there was a connection and asks to be set free."

Hampele later reprised her role to facilitate Milligan's exit from Neighbours. Speaking to a writer for the show's official website, Hampele said it was "a bit surreal" coming back to the set, but she enjoyed see the cast and crew again. When asked if Georgia and Kyle should be together, she said "They are so compatible and even after all of the struggles they have been through they always seemed to make sense together. It's been an amazing journey seeing them grow and mature as a couple, and it feels like the right outcome to have them live happily ever after...but who knows?" Georgia returned on 4 April 2016.

In 2019, ahead of the news that Milligan would be reintroduced to the serial, Hempele explained that returning to the serial on a permanent basis was not in her interests. She said, "One of the reasons I decided to leave Neighbours is because once you are at Neighbours, you are very much locked into that role for as long as you are on the show. It doesn't give you flexibility to play other characters, and for me, after three years of playing one character, I didn't feel challenged anymore. Unless they have a character with multiple personalities to keep jumping between different roles... going back permanently isn't in my plans." Hempele also thanked the serial for giving her Georgia, which she called a "dream role" for her.

== Storylines ==
Georgia comes to Erinsborough after getting a nursing job at the local hospital. She moves in with her cousin Toadie and his family on Ramsay Street. Georgia befriends Kate Ramsay (Ashleigh Brewer) and helps to organise a bush dance for the school formal, befriending Kyle Canning in the process. Karl Kennedy reprimands Georgia for not filing paperwork correctly and gives her some files to sort through. Georgia comes across a patient file that contains few details and learns that her colleague, Aidan Foster (Bobby Morley), created a fake file for Andrew Robinson (Jordan Patrick Smith). Aidan asks Georgia not to reveal what he has done, but she tells Karl and Aidan is suspended. Georgia's boyfriend, Scotty, arrives and becomes jealous of her friendship with Kyle. Georgia notices that a newborn Patrick Villante (Lucas MacFarlane) has a heart problem and she struggles with the emotional impact of her job. When Scotty fails to support her, she becomes closer to Kyle. His grandmother, Sheila (Colette Mann), tries to discourage Georgia's crush on him. Georgia breaks up with Scotty, but soon learns Kyle is dating someone else. Georgia organises a charity camp out for the hospital and when Scotty asks her to try again, she agrees.

Georgia later accepts Scotty's marriage proposal. But before they can elope, Kyle informs Georgia that Scotty made sexual advances towards Chris Pappas. Scotty does not deny Kyle's accusations and he flees Erinsborough, leaving a brief written apology behind. Georgia works extra shifts at the hospital and tries to avoid Chris. She is also prescribed some sleeping pills by Karl. Georgia goes for a drink with her patient Pete Clark. Pete later offers Georgia drugs and she spends the night partying with him. Sonya finds the drugs in Georgia's bag the following day, after which Georgia tells Pete that they can no longer be friends. When Georgia leaves the keys to the drugs store unattended, some medication goes missing and Georgia is fired. At the same time, Georgia and Kyle enjoy a romantic date and he helps her to clear her name, after he finds a student selling the drugs. Georgia's job is reinstated when it emerges that the student's mother, another nurse at the hospital, stole the drugs. Kyle brings Scotty back to Erinsborough, so Georgia can get some closure. Georgia tries to take care of Kyle when his eyesight is damaged during an eclipse, but Kyle becomes frustrated and he briefly breaks up with her. Georgia joins Karl and Ajay Kapoor's (Sachin Joab) band The Right Prescription.

After seeing a video of Georgia singing, Paul Robinson (Stefan Dennis) offers Georgia a contract to sing solo at Charlie's. Georgia struggles when she is unable to save Robbo Slade (Aaron Jakubenko) and begins cancelling shifts at the hospital. She decides to give up her nursing career to pursue singing full-time. When she saves Jack Lassiter's (Alan Hopgood) life, Georgia asks Paul to be let out of her contract, but he refuses. Georgia finds it hard coping with two careers and Kyle notices that she is constantly tired. Paul gives Georgia's song to another artist, Amali Ward, but Amali gives the song back to Georgia and she tells Paul that the proceeds from the sale of the song will go to charity. Paul sues Georgia for breach of contract, but later drops the case. Georgia's cousin Gem (Kathryn Beck) arrives in town and fails to get on with Kate. Georgia and Kyle get engaged, and decide to move in together. During their engagement party, Georgia reads out an email from Kate detailing her one-night stand with Kyle. Georgia ends her relationship with Kyle and her friendship with Kate.

Gem uses Georgia's grief to isolate her from everyone, and they decide to go to the country for a while. While there, Georgia gets a text explaining that Gem hacked Kate's laptop and printed out the email. Georgia confronts Gem, who turns nasty and pushes Georgia backwards into the cooker, starting the gas. Gem pushes Georgia again and she is knocked unconscious. Gem leaves Georgia alone in the cabin as it fills up with gas. Kate finds Georgia in time and she only suffers from mild gas inhalation and a minor head injury. Georgia discovers she is pregnant and decides to keep the news from Kyle, as she discovers he is in a relationship with Kate. Kyle eventually finds out about the pregnancy, after Georgia faints and is taken to hospital. When she decides to move back home, Kyle proves to her that he can provide for their baby and she agrees to stay in Erinsborough. Georgia has a miscarriage and she tries to move on without Kyle. However, after Kate dies, Georgia realises life is too short and they reconcile.

Kyle spends several weeks in Thailand and when he returns, Georgia fears he has lost interest in her, but Kyle assures her he loves her and he and Georgia get engaged for a second time. Georgia tries to help out Kyle's business by getting him a job making beds for the hospital. Kyle is unhappy with Georgia when he learns that she has been secretly paying him, but they make up and set a day for the wedding. Sheila takes over the planning for their wedding, leading them to fall out with her when she organises a lavish engagement party. They also try to reconcile Sheila with her daughter, Naomi (Morgana O'Reilly). When Georgia develops a sore throat, Karl examines her and tells her she has a large nodule on her vocal chord. Georgia opts to have surgery to remove it, in case it turns cancerous. The surgery goes well, but shortly afterwards, Georgia begins coughing up blood. She is rushed back into surgery and Karl explains that the incision reopened, but Georgia will be okay. Kyle stays with Georgia while she recovers. Georgia briefly goes missing as a tornado hits Erinsborough, when she has to chase after Kyle's dog Bossy. Kyle goes out looking for her and he disappears. The following day, Georgia finds him trapped in a portable toilet. Karl informs Georgia that there is severe scarring on her vocal chords and it is highly unlikely she will ever sing again. Georgia suspects that there has been some misconduct by her surgeon, Jessica Girdwood, and that Karl is covering for her. An investigation later finds that there was no negligence on Dr Girdwood's behalf, and Georgia apologises to Karl.

During their joint bucks and hens nights, Georgia and Kyle find Chris with serious head injuries outside The Waterhole. Georgia questions whether Chris's boyfriend Nate Kinski (Meyne Wyatt), an Afghanistan veteran, could have been the perpetrator. However, Josh Willis (Harley Bonner) confesses, and Georgia apologises to Nate. She is upset when Toadie agrees to represent Josh in court, and refuses to support him as a result. After Kyle sees Georgia in her wedding dress, he suspects that their wedding is cursed. He then loses the ring in the lake and his friend Honga cannot make the ceremony. Georgia drives to Frankston to convince him to come, but her car battery goes flat and her phone dies, so she has to hitch a ride back to Erinsborough. Georgia and Kyle then marry without any problems in front of their family and friends. Kyle asks Georgia to try for another baby and she agrees to throw away her contraceptive pills, but changes her mind as she fears having another miscarriage. Sheila finds out and Georgia tells Kyle. They agree to wait until they are both ready. Nick Petrides (Damien Fotiou) befriends and flirts with Georgia. She soon finds out that Nick made a bet with Paul that he can have sex with her. Nick tries to pass it off as a joke, but Georgia pours her drink over him. After a patient's details are posted on Georgia's social networking site, she is suspended from work. She tries to find evidence that Nick set her up and gains entry to his hotel room. She copies his hard drive to a USB stick and hides it as Nick enters the room. She calls the police herself and is arrested, but manages to give the USB to Kyle.

Karl later informs Georgia that she has been fired from the hospital. Georgia discovers that Paul's medical records match those of another patient, and thereby deduces that Paul never had leukaemia. She tells Mark Brennan (Scott McGregor) and he questions Nick. When IT find that Nick deleted Paul's patient files in a bid to cover up his crime, he is arrested. Karl tells Georgia that the hospital board have reinstated her job, but she will receive no apology or compensation. When Georgia learns that her mother, Rhonda (Kim Denman) has cancer again, she manages to get her into a specialist clinic in Germany. Georgia becomes distracted while treating Nell (Scarlett Anderson) and almost gives her an overdose of paracetamol. She apologises and takes some leave from the hospital, before deciding to join her mother in Germany. Georgia tells Kyle to stay behind for his business and join her later. After an impromptu farewell party with her friends and family, Georgia leaves for Munich. Georgia and Kyle speak via Skype, but communication between them decreases. Angie contacts Georgia and learns Rhonda's treatment has been successful, so they are coming home. Georgia arrives back to find that Kyle has been visited by Greg Keys, a man she met in Germany. She admits that they had a moment, but nothing physical happened between them. Georgia asks Kyle for a year apart and tells him not to wait for her, before leaving.

The following year, Georgia returns to Erinsborough and asks Kyle to meet her at Lassiter's Hotel. Georgia explains that she has got a job at the German clinic her mother was treated at. She tells Kyle that she still loves him and wants him back. They kiss and Georgia gives Kyle a ticket to Germany. They kiss again, but are interrupted by Kyle's new girlfriend Amy Williams (Zoe Cramond). Kyle chases after Amy, and shortly after the boiler room explodes. Kyle and Amy get out of the hotel, and Kyle leaves Erinsborough to be with Georgia in Germany. Three years later, Kyle returns to Erinsborough and tells his family that he and Georgia have separated due to him still having feelings for Amy.

== Reception ==
Thomas Mitchell from TV Week called Georgia an "Erinsborough hottie". Peter Munro from The Sydney Morning Herald branded the character "goofy" and noted that she was not even sure what month it was. Melinda Houston from The Sun-Herald said that Georgia was "understandably upset" when she learned the truth about Scotty. Of the character's reaction to Scotty's secret, Anthony D. Langford from TheBacklot.com commented "I find Georgia unraveling about what happened with Scotty to be a bit much since she wasn't in love with Scotty and would have dumped him for Kyle if given half the chance." He added that Georgia's "coolness" towards Chris was logical though, given the state of mind she was in.

A Newcastle Herald reporter thought Georgia was "carrying the weight of the world on her shoulders" when she was worrying about getting fired. In June 2013, The Daily Telegraph's Dianne Butler stated "Georgia's a gorgeous crowd-pulling blonde, but she's as dumb as furniture." Langford disliked Georgia's exit storyline, commenting "I know the actress has left the show, but that’s a weird way to write her out."
