= Neighbours: The Explosion =

Storyline from the Australian soap opera Neighbours

Neighbours: The Explosion is a storyline from the Australian television soap opera Neighbours, which began on 19 March 2013, when the marquee hosting Toadfish Rebecchi (Ryan Moloney) and Sonya Mitchell's (Eve Morey) wedding reception collapsed after a gas bottle exploded. The storyline also saw the deaths of two regular characters; Rhys Lawson (Ben Barber) and Priya Kapoor (Menik Gooneratne). "Neighbours: The Explosion" was broadcast as the highlight of the serial's 28th anniversary week and executive producer Richard Jasek stated that the wedding was a good opportunity to heighten the drama and have the event affect the whole community. The cast and crew played on Toadie's previous bad luck with weddings for the storyline and Moloney thought it would rival his 2003 wedding to Dee Bliss (Madeleine West), which ended in her presumed death.

Filming for the storyline commenced during late November 2012 at FremantleMedia Australia's Melbourne studios and on location in Kangaroo Ground. The episodes were filmed over four days; the wedding ceremony and the reception scenes were shot in the first two days, with the explosion being shot on the third day and the aftermath on the fourth. Filming of the actual explosion took four hours and it was created using low-impact explosives and special effects. Two explosions were filmed from different angles and the scenes were then merged during post-production. The scene was one biggest stunts the show had shot in a while.

Both Eleven and Channel 5 released promotional trailers for the storyline. Channel 5 also announced that as well as screening the explosion episodes during their usual afternoon timeslots, they would also air an hour-long episode at 10pm, marking the first time the soap had been aired during prime time in the UK. The broadcast gave viewers a chance to see the explosion and a first look at the following episode. The hour-long episode brought in 1.44 million viewers. In Australia, the explosion episode attracted 280,000 viewers, making Neighbours the third most watched show on digital multi-channels that night. "Neighbours: The Explosion" was well received by critics, who believed it was one of the "biggest storylines of the year".

== Plot ==
After learning their best man and bridesmaid cannot make it to their wedding, Sonya Mitchell and Toadfish Rebecchi are relieved when their friends Lucas Fitzgerald (Scott Major) and Vanessa Villante (Alin Sumarwata) step in. Sonya wonders if it will be weird using stand-ins on such an important day, but Toadie assures her that it will be fine. He also mentions that he is starting to feel relieved that nothing serious has gone wrong. Just as they discuss their honeymoon, Paul Robinson (Stefan Dennis) calls round to tell the couple that the ballroom at Lassister's Hotel has raw sewage running through it and the kitchen is out of order. Toadie asks Paul how they can have the reception there and Paul tells them that he has arranged a marquee for them in the hotel's grounds. He will also give them the use of a suite for the day, as a gesture of good will. After Paul leaves, Sonya tries to calm Toadie down.

On the day of the wedding, Rani Kapoor (Coco Cherian) argues with her mother, Priya (Menik Gooneratne) about the dress she has to wear. At the church, Vanessa waits outside for Sonya and her son, Callum (Morgan Baker), who is giving his mother away. Inside, Toadie talks to the guests, then goes over to sit with Lucas and claims that he should be used to getting married by now. The ceremony begins and Sonya and Toadie recite their vows. They exchange rings and are pronounced husband and wife. Everyone poses for photos and they head to Lassiter's for the reception. At the same time, Mason Turner (Taylor Glockner) and Robbo Slade (Aaron Jakubenko) are finalising plans to rob the hotel. At Lassiter's, Sonya struggles to find a signal on her phone and decides to walk around the corner. She finds two men with balaclavas on and overhears them mention the hotel has laid on extra security for a wedding. Robbo takes his balaclava off and notices Sonya when her phone rings again. Sonya notices the other man's distinctive belt buckle, before they run off.

Sonya speaks to the police and then goes to the reception. Toadie and Sonya give speeches, perform a special wedding dance and cut the cake. Outside, Callum compliment Rani's dress, but Rani believes he is making fun of her and after telling Priya that she hates her, Rani leaves. Mason turns up to work as a waiter. As Sonya puts her drink down on his tray, she spots Mason's belt buckle and remembers it from the robbery earlier. With most of the party outside, Rhys Lawson (Ben Barber) comes inside to get a drink, while Priya tells her husband, Ajay (Sachin Joab), that she is going to text Rani. Outside the marquee, a shocked Sonya prepares to throw her bouquet, while one of the waiters changes the gas bottle. As Sonya throws the bouquet, a fire breaks out and the marquee explodes. Rhys comes to and tries to stand up, while Toadie discovers Sonya is bleeding from the back of her head. Ajay runs into the collapsed marquee to find Priya. Karl Kennedy (Alan Fletcher) advises Toadie not to move Sonya, before going to help out with the other injured guests.

Kyle Canning (Chris Milligan) helps Rhys out of the marquee. Rhys insists that he has just hurt his ribs and since he is a doctor, he knows that he will be fine. Ajay finds Priya is unconscious; having been crushed by a heavy pot plant that has fallen on her abdomen. Karl has to resuscitate Priya, while Sonya and Rhys are taken to hospital. At the hospital, Rhys is checked over and Priya is brought in. Karl discreetly tells Rhys that she had to be resuscitated again in the ambulance. Rhys's mother comes to see him and he maintains that he is fine. Sonya has a bleed on the brain, but Toadie insists she will be okay. Ajay tries to get hold of Rani, but she ignores the calls. Kyle finds her and brings her to the hospital, where Ajay explains what happened. Rhys checks himself out of the hospital, against Karl's wishes. Rhys tells Kyle that he has decided to meet with his estranged father. As Kyle struggles with his ute's lock, he notices Rhys has collapsed. He calls out for help and Karl tries to revive Rhys, who has died from an undetected blood clot.

At Number 32, Mason attempts to hide his clothes from the robbery and informs his sister, Amber (Jenna Rosenow), that Robbo has skipped town. Back at the hospital, Karl informs Ajay and Rani that Priya has suffered a cerebral hypoxia and she will not wake up. Ajay is shocked and comforts Rani when she breaks down. They say their final goodbyes to Priya and Rani apologises for how she treated her. Priya's life support is then switched off. Five days later, Sonya wakes from her coma, but suffers some memory loss. Ajay launches a class action suit against Paul and the hotel. However, when it emerges the gas bottle had been faulty, Ajay launches a case against the manufactures instead. Weeks later, Sonya regains her memories during a vow renewal ceremony. She also remembers Mason and Robbo were involved in the robbery at Lassiter's and reports them to the police.

== Production ==
=== Conception and development ===
"It's no secret Toadie is jinxed when it comes to getting hitched, and it's fair to say it seems like his worst nightmares may be about to come true. Ramsay Street will never be the same again. Two characters will die. The question is who…?"

— Channel 5's Greg Barnett on the storyline.

During a Digital Spy interview published on 7 February 2013, Neighbours executive producer Richard Jasek teased an upcoming storyline that would be as memorable as the 2012 car crash storyline. On the same day, in an interview with Daniel Kilkelly and Alex Fletcher, Ryan Moloney who plays Toadfish Rebecchi explained that there would be "lots of disasters" in the lead up to his character's wedding to Sonya Mitchell (Eve Morey), which would climax "with quite a big bang". The explosion storyline was further rumoured and teased, before it was officially confirmed on 26 February 2013 when a promotional trailer began airing in Australia. The storyline was also the main feature of the show's 28th anniversary week.

Jasek explained that when the team were given the chance to shoot a big event, like a wedding, that involved all of the cast, it was "the perfect opportunity" to heighten the drama and have the event effect the whole community. He continued "These events are always challenging but at the same time exciting for our crews because we are taking a different approach and there is an action element to it the cast love." Moloney agreed and said that it felt different when the cast and crew shot big scenes like the explosion. Greg Barnett, the Commissioning Editor of Entertainment and Soaps from Channel 5, stated that there would be "unmissable" drama during the wedding and the storyline would feature "one of the biggest stunts the series has experienced in a while". Toadie's previous bad luck on his wedding days had led him to believe he was cursed. His wedding to Dee Bliss (Madeleine West) in 2003 resulted in her presumed death after they plunged over a cliff on the way to the honeymoon. In 2008, Toadie was left at the altar by Stephanie Scully (Carla Bonner) and in 2010, he entered into a sham marriage with her.

Of the buildup to Sonya and Toadie's wedding, Moloney stated "Toadie is just convinced that things don't go well for him on weddings. He's pretty right, really! Lots of things go wrong like venue changes, best men getting ill, Jade not being able to make it from New York, and all this kind of stuff." Moloney believed that the explosion storyline would rival that of his wedding to Dee. Morey said that she was "pretty upset" when she learned that there would be an explosion on Sonya and Toadie's wedding day. She called the storyline sad, dramatic and big. She later told Vicki Power from the Daily Express, "I've just watched these episodes and I have been bawling my eyes out. It's really heavy, heavy stuff. I've never seen anything like this on Neighbours." As Toadie was worried that something bad would happen at the wedding, he is relieved when everything goes well and he and Sonya are married. However, at their reception, which is being held in a marquee in the grounds of Lassiter's Hotel, a gas canister explodes as Sonya throws her bouquet.

It was also confirmed by the producers that two characters would be killed off during the storyline. Rhys Lawson (played by Ben Barber) was confirmed to be the first fatality of the explosion. Barber's departure was previously announced in November 2012, but details of his character's exit were initially kept secret. While Rhys survived the explosion and the resulting collapse of the marquee, he later died of his injuries after discharging himself from the hospital. Barber commented "Rhys is a headstrong guy and he thinks he is absolutely fine. But, his overconfidence is ultimately his undoing and, as he leaves the hospital, he collapses, leaving Kyle (Chris Milligan) kneeling over his lifeless body."

The second victim of the explosion was local principal Priya Kapoor (Menik Gooneratne). Although, Gooneratne's exit had been reported seven days before the storyline began, viewers were initially left guessing as to whether Priya or Sonya would die. Sonya sustained a serious head injury when she was thrown off her feet during the explosion. She was rushed to the hospital unconscious and with a swelling in the brain. Meanwhile, Priya was trapped inside the marquee when the explosion took place and was crushed by a heavy pot plant that fell on her abdomen. Like Sonya, she was also unconscious and had internal bleeding. However, Priya's condition deteriorated and eventually her life support was switched off.

=== Filming ===
On 22 November 2012, a reporter for Channel 5 revealed that filming for the storyline had commenced during the week. Scenes were filmed at FremantleMedia Australia's Melbourne studios, as well as on location in Kangaroo Ground. The episodes were filmed over four days; the wedding ceremony and the reception scenes were shot in the first two days, with the explosion being shot on the third day and the aftermath on the fourth. Morey commented "It was nice that it was all broken up, as it meant that we could actually enjoy the happy wedding part! It was so lovely filming it, so it was quite surreal to know that it was all going to explode later on! When we did the aftermath, I just had to lie there so I was lucky, but everyone else was running around screaming. It was hectic!"

Planning for the explosion scene began six weeks before it was shot, while filming took a total of four hours. The cast and crew underwent a safety drill first, while trained Occupational Health and Safety officers from FremantleMedia were on the set. Thomas Mitchell from TV Week revealed that a filming permit was not required for the explosion scene as it was not shot on public land, rather private land owned by FremantleMedia. To create the explosion, the production team used low-impact explosives and special effects. Two explosions were filmed from different angles, with the scenes then merged during post-production. Jasek said it was "certainly one of the biggest scenes" they had filmed since the car crash storyline. He added that everything went to plan, including the weather.

== Promotion ==
In late February 2013, Neighbours released a promotional trailer for the storyline in Australia. The trailer features scenes of Toadie and Sonya's vows, the explosion and then an injured Rhys lying in the wreckage. At the end of the promo, the tagline claims that "two favourites won't survive". Channel 5 confirmed that they would also launch their own teaser campaign for the storyline ahead of it UK broadcast. Their trailer was filmed in January, following Moloney's appearance on Celebrity Big Brother. The 60 second spot was directed by Jo Ridley, with The VFX Company providing the effects. The trailer was shot using green screen, real shot flames and CG.

Channel 5 released the promo on 19 March. It sees Toadie carrying a bride, whose face is obscured by her veil, into a hotel room and laying her down on a bed. Flames suddenly start to engulf the room, while Toadie throws down six photos on a table. The characters in the photos are Paul, Priya, Rhys and Callum. One photo has been left blank and a reporter for the Press Association thought that it could be meant for Sonya. The trailer ends with the tagline "Not every wedding has a happy ending..."

Two behind-the-scenes videos were released on the serial's YouTube account. The first video focuses on the filming of Toadie and Sonya's wedding, as well as the cast's take on the day. The second deals with the aftermath of the explosion. Channel 5 also released some behind-the-scenes photos of the scenes from the storyline on their website. On 26 March, more pictures previewing the scenes were released by the channel.

== Broadcast ==
The storyline began airing from 19 March 2013 in Australia and from 16 April in the UK. Channel 5 announced that as well as screening the explosion episode during its usual afternoon timeslots, they would also air it at 10pm. Kilkelly reported "At 10pm, an hour-long screening will give viewers another chance to see the blast and a first look at Wednesday's tragic aftermath episode. By giving Neighbours the bonus slot, network chiefs will be hoping to hook in new and returning viewers as the wedding day disaster provides a natural point to start watching." The 10pm showing of Neighbours marked the first time the soap had been aired during prime time in the UK. The day before the episode aired, the Boston Marathon bombings occurred. Channel 5 decided to go ahead with the screening of "Neighbours: The Explosion" after an editorial discussion. The prime time episode was reworked to cater to new viewers. It included pre-titles and end-of-show trailers, flashbacks and modern chart music instead of the original music used in the Australian broadcast.

== Reception ==
=== Ratings ===
The episode featuring the explosion was viewed by 280,000 Australians upon its first airing, making Neighbours the third most watched show on digital multi-channels that night. In the UK, the episode achieved strong viewing figures. 1.04 million watched the episode during its lunchtime showing, while 1.25 million tuned in during the early evening. The hour-long screening of Neighbours at 10pm saw another increase, achieving an audience of 1.44 million and making Neighbours the fifth most watched show of the week. The episode featuring the aftermath of the explosion saw an increase in viewers in Australia, with 309,000 tuning in. The same episode garnered 1 million viewers in the UK. The third episode, featuring Priya's death, achieved 260,000 viewers in Australia and 1.09 million in the UK.

=== Critical response ===
The storyline received positive attention from critics. Dianne Butler, writing for the Herald Sun, quipped "the bride and groom give a bit of a shudder when Paul Robinson arrives at their door on the morning of the wedding, but I think that's most people's reaction any time Paul shows up. But it's a lovely day – yellow roses, Karl doesn't sing – apart from the robbery, and the screaming and the ambulances. Neighbours eh? Brilliant. Nobody's done a wedding like this in years." Kate Lucey from Sugar called "Neighbours: The Explosion" one of the serial's "biggest storylines of the year" and included it in her feature on upcoming dramatic soap storylines. Lucey said "With an upcoming fire in the Rovers Return for Coronation Street, an explosion in Neighbours and the newly announced plans for a pregnancy in EastEnders, we're not really sure where to look first." Daniel Kilkelly from Digital Spy stated that the explosion was "one of 2013's biggest storylines." Of the explosion, a columnist from New! commented "This is one episode you DO NOT want to miss!"

Jane Rackham from the Radio Times wrote "It seems Toadie's fears that his wedding to Sonya is jinxed are justified as his big day ends in tragedy in this dramatic episode." A Daily Post reporter quipped "No wedding goes without a hitch in soapland, and Toadie and Sonya's is no exception." On the day the episode was broadcast in the UK, All About Soap's Claire Crick wrote "There's just one thing you need to have at the top of your to-do list today… and that's watch Neighbours! The day of the explosion has finally arrived and the episode will be epic from start to finish – we promise!" Digital Spy ran a poll asking readers whether Channel 5 should put Neighbours in the prime time slot again and 89.12% believed that it would be a good idea.

Time Out's Phil Harrison reviewed the hour-long episode and gave it three out of five stars. He observed that Toadie getting married again could only lead to "horrible tragedy" and thought the event would be remembered alongside other great moments from the show's history. He added "In the run-up to the terrible incident itself, the cheese is ramped up to Stinking Bishop levels. And then, suddenly, it's out with the old and in with the new. Ramsay Street will never be the same again – although that grim prognosis might not apply to the cockroach-like Paul Robinson, who lurks around the fringes, as sneaky and implacable as ever. Aussie TV at its absolute best…" Sarah from Inside Soap believed that "Neighbours: The Explosion" would top his wedding to Dee. She called the ceremony "both romantic and touching" and guaranteed viewers would be "shedding tears by the end of the week."

In 2014, Jessica Boulton from NOW included the storyline in her list of the "Top 10 Most Explosive TV Weddings EVER". Placing it at number six, Boulton quipped "The Aussie soap's long-suffering Toadie was hoping it'd be third time lucky when he wed Sonya Mitchell (not the trumpet-playing one). But his hopes went up in smoke (ahem) when there was an explosion at the reception which killed off half their guests. But, hey, they were probably barbecuing anyway..." In 2022, a reporter from The Scotsman included the explosion as one of the show's top five moments from the show's entire history.
