= Aidan Foster =

- Neighbours character
- Portrayed by: Bob Morley
- Duration: 2011–2013
- First appearance: 19 August 2011
- Last appearance: 17 January 2013
- Introduced by: Susan Bower
In-universe information
- Occupation: Nurse

Aidan Foster is a fictional character from the Australian soap opera Neighbours, played by Bob Morley. Both the character and Morley's casting was announced on 19 June 2011. The actor began filming his first scenes that same week. Aidan was introduced to Neighbours as a love interest for established character Chris Pappas (James Mason). Morley revealed that Aidan's sexuality did not affect his decision in accepting the role, as it does not define him. Morley was initially contracted for six months and he stated that he was happy to stay with the soap for longer. He made his first screen appearance as Aidan during the episode broadcast on 19 August 2011. Morley took a ten-week break from Neighbours in April 2012 to appear in the feature film, Blinder. He made his final appearance as Aidan on 17 January 2013.

Aidan is a nurse who works at the local hospital in Erinsborough. He is openly gay and comfortable with his sexuality. Aidan had many relationships in the past, making him more experienced than Chris. He is confident, trustworthy and likes to seize the day. Aidan meets Chris after he is brought into the hospital and he becomes endeared by him. Even though Aidan questions his decision to get involved with a younger, less experienced guy, he and Chris eventually begin a relationship. The characters became Neighbours' first ever gay couple and they later shared the soap's first male gay kiss. Morley praised the producers for not sensationalising the kiss, which gained positive feedback from viewers. Morley's break from Neighbours in mid-2012 led the writers to improvise a breakup for Aidan and Chris, which played out in May.

== Creation and casting ==
The character of Aidan was created and introduced to Neighbours as a love interest for Chris Pappas (James Mason). The show's executive producer Susan Bower believed that it was "a natural progression" for Chris to have a love interest after he was promoted to the regular cast. The character and Morley's casting was announced on 19 June 2011. The actor began filming his first scenes that same week. Morley told the Herald Sun's Luke Dennehy that Aidan's sexuality did not affect his decision in accepting the role, saying "I don't see it as a big deal that the character is gay. It certainly doesn't define him and what the writers have planned is really interesting and authentic."

Morley was initially contracted for six months with the possibility of an extension. During an interview with Digital Spy's Daniel Kilkelly, Morley revealed that he would be happy to stay with the soap for longer, but only if the storyline moved beyond Aidan and Chris's relationship and sexuality. He added that he found it easy to "fit into the rhythm of the show", as the pace of filming was similar to fellow soap opera Home and Away, which he starred in for two years. Morley took a ten-week break from Neighbours in April 2012 to appear in the feature film Blinder. He returned to the soap in June, sporting a shorter haircut.

== Development ==
=== Characterisation ===
Aidan is a nurse who works at Erinsborough Hospital. Morley told a TV Week reporter "He's not really into being a surgeon or progressing in that kind of sense, and he just comes on to the scene because he works with Dr Rhys Lawson. They become friends, and from that he starts seeing other people who live in Ramsay Street." The actor stated that Aidan is "confident and comfortable with his sexuality" as well as being confident in himself and where he is going in life. Aidan is the type of person who likes to seize the day, but if it does not work out, he does not dwell on it. Morley noted that it was nice to be playing someone who is "a kind character", which was a change from other roles he had played.

John Burfitt, writing for TV Soap, commented that Aidan is the kind of person you can trust and rely on. He is openly gay and his family were very accepting of his sexuality. Morley revealed that Aidan has had a lot of relationships in the past, making him more experienced than Chris. The actor said he was happy with his character's slow introduction as it worked well for him, saying "Aidan comes into the street incrementally and he isn't defined by his sexuality." He went on to tell the TV Week reporter that Aidan fits in quite easily. He befriends Jade Mitchell (Gemma Pranita) and works with Rhys (Ben Barber), plus his role at the hospital meant he crossed paths with many other characters.

=== Relationship with Chris Pappas ===
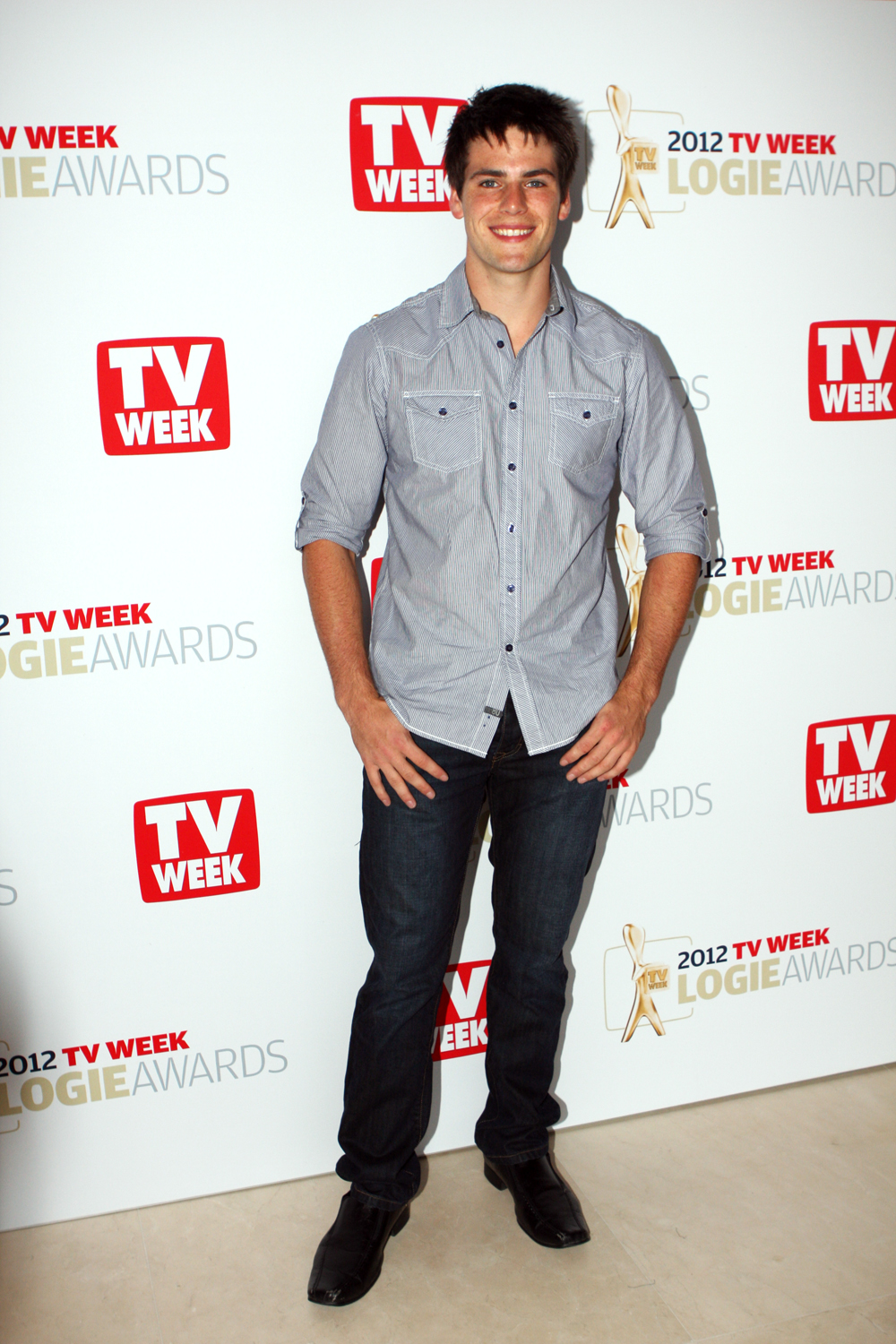
James Mason (pictured) plays Chris Pappas, Aidan's love interest.

Aidan meets Chris when he is brought into the hospital following a "vicious beating". Aidan provides a source of kindness and support for Chris and Morley stated "I think that Aidan is endeared by Chris because of the time he spent in hospital caring for him. He saw a side of Chris that he is really fond of, and he thinks Chris is sweet and also naïve to the world in terms of being gay." Aidan later takes his car to the local garage to be serviced and he flirts with Chris, who is not aware of what is going on. Mason told John Burfitt from TV Soap that there would be "a slow burn" between Chris and Aidan and things would not be rushed, as Chris does not get much of what is happening. Chris's boss, Lucas Fitzgerald (Scott Major), attempts to help by trying to find out asking Aidan if he is gay or straight, which leads to embarrassment for them all. The appearance of Chris's father, George (Lliam Amor), makes the situation worse and when Aidan asks Chris out for a drink, he turns him down. Mason told an Inside Soap writer "George is only just starting to accept that his son is gay, so when Aidan invites Chris for a drink, Chris turns him down out of fear of what his dad will think." Morley stated that Aidan takes the "knock back" in his stride and does not feel too bad about it.

Chris's friend, Natasha (Valentina Novakovic), later decides to play matchmaker and invites Aidan along to a barbecue, where he and Chris start to bond. When asked what the atmosphere is like, Morley stated "In that instance coming from Aidan's perspective it could be awkward since Chris has already rejected him, but Aidan is a little bit older and wiser. He is just having fun, while for Chris, it means something else." Chris accidentally injures Aidan during a game of pool and Vaughn Redden (Kain O'Keeffe) tends to the injury. He flirts with Aidan and they later go on a date, which makes Chris feel like he has missed his chance him. Mason revealed that this leads to some new tension between the characters. Aidan and Chris later arrange a date, even though Aidan is wondering whether getting involved with a younger, less experienced guy is a good idea. Burfitt commented that Aidan's fears are confirmed when the date turns into "a complete disaster". Chris is initially anxious and on edge, until he realises Aidan is having fun and relaxes. However, at that minute, Natasha calls Chris away to help with a crisis and he leaves Aidan alone. Aidan assumes Chris has set the whole thing up to get out of the date, but Chris explains everything and Aidan forgives him because he is keen to see where things are going.

Aidan and Chris go out on another date, which goes well and they start spending a lot of time together, marking the beginning of their relationship. Aidan and Chris formed Neighbours' first ever gay couple. On 9 April 2012, Aidan and Chris shared their first on-screen kiss. The couple, who had not shown any sign of physical affection until this point, share "a rather passionate embrace" during a house party thrown by Natasha. Morely told TV Week's Andrew Mercado, "The boys are there at the party and just share this intimate moment, as couples do. I take my hat off to the producers of Neighbours for going with it and not sensationalising it. There is still a taboo around the subject, but there shouldn't be at all." The actor revealed the kiss was just as awkward as any other on-screen kiss, but he and Mason spent a lot of time and effort into getting it right for their characters. Despite featuring a few lesbian kisses, this was the show's first male gay kiss in its 27-year history. Bower had previously promised that the kiss would not be "sensationalist or token" and the low-key scene earned praise from viewers on social networking sites. The kiss attracted attention from the media.

"The character that Bob is playing is older and further down the track with his relationship testing, so it will be a relationship story rather than a gay male romance."

— Susan Bower on Chris and Aidan's relationship

Chris's friendship with Natasha starts to affect his relationship with Aidan, who asks him to choose between them. When Natasha's party is ruined, Chris rushes straight to her aid. Natasha also steals Chris's attention from Aidan and he often drops everything for her, even though she would not do the same for him. Aidan, who has become tired of Chris always making excuses for Natasha, tells him to start asserting himself instead. Morley explained to a TV Soap writer, "It's not that Aidan doesn't approve of Tash, rather it's the way that she has been treating Chris that Aidan doesn't agree with. This, coupled with the fact that Chris isn't standing up for himself, sends Aidan over the edge." Chris feels "shattered" at having to choose between his boyfriend and best friend. Mason commented that his character just needed to learn how to handle them both. Aidan feels the situation is just part of the "getting to know each other" phase, but Chris panics and assumes his relationship is about to come to an end. Morley revealed "The relationship is in its early exciting stage and the pair and starting to get used to each other and learning more about one another. Aidan is mature enough to see this is just a small hiccup, whereas Chris fears the very worst." Chris's reaction to the situation threatens the work that he and Aidan have done to build up a strong relationship. It also forces Aidan to take a new look at Chris and how young he is.

A writer for What's on TV reported that Morley's break from Neighbours in mid-2012 led the writers to improvise a breakup for Aidan and Chris. Morley stated "That's Ramsay Street for you, one minute it's on, then it's off." He explained that it would not be the end for the couple, saying "I don't think the producers have me back for my nursing skills. Lots more to come with those two." The break up occurs after Aidan learns Chris has not told his parents that they are in a relationship. Mason revealed to an Inside Soap writer that Chris is fine with his relationship being out in the open when it comes to his friends, but it is different story with his parents. His father has not always made things easy for him in the past, so he does not give him and his mother a chance to get to know Aidan. When Chris's parents throw him a birthday party at Lassiter's Lake, he does not invite Aidan. However, Aidan finds out about the party from one of Chris's friends and goes to the lake to see for himself. He feels "betrayed, hurt and humiliated" by Chris and makes it clear that their relationship is over. Mason added "That's when the gravity of the situation hits Chris, and he's left in shock. He thinks, 'How did it come to this?'. Things really seemed to be falling into place with Aidan." The situation becomes worse for Chris when his parents reveal that they would have accepted the relationship. He then realises that he has lost Aidan due to an assumption.

=== Helping Andrew Robinson ===
When Chris's friend Andrew Robinson (Jordan Patrick Smith) mentions that he is suffering from dizziness and disorientation following a recent car accident, Aidan suggests that he might be suffering from concussion. Andrew is later diagnosed with epilepsy and he turns to Aidan for help. Aidan recognises Andrew is in denial about his condition and tries to encourage him to tell his father. He also suggests that Andrew checks into the hospital for some overnight tests, but when his father turns up, Andrew leaves without getting the right medication. Smith explained "Andrew won't come clean to Paul, so he seeks Aidan's help to get the drugs. Aidan knows if he doesn't advise Andrew, it could end very badly." Andrew orders some medication over the internet, believing that he can get his symptoms under control, and Aidan agrees to help him manage it.

Aidan manages to convince Andrew to take a blood test and puts them through the hospital system under a fake name to protect him. Aidan continues to encourage Andrew to receive treatment, but is blackmailed into keeping his epilepsy diagnosis a secret. A few months later, Aidan is suspended from the hospital when someone tells his supervisor Karl Kennedy (Alan Fletcher) about the blood test. While he is looking at losing his job, Aidan "hits the town hard" to cope with the situation and he does not want Chris with him. Mason commented "It's the start of Aidan pulling away from Chris," James says. "Aidan's hiding things and I think [viewers] will see his body language is slowly changing."

== Storylines ==
Aidan helps treat Natasha Williams, after she is brought into the hospital with a head injury. Her father, Michael (Sandy Winton), asks after her and Aidan tells him that she will be fine. He then praises her friends for knowing CPR. Aidan catches Susan Kennedy (Jackie Woodburne) trying to take Jim Dolan (Scott Parmeter) out of the hospital and he tells her that Jim is far too sick to leave his bed. Susan explains that Jim wants some fresh air and Aidan helps Jim into a wheelchair. Aidan attends a barbecue thrown by his colleague, Rhys Lawson, and he befriends Jade Mitchell. Aidan helps Rhys treat Chris Pappas when he is brought into the hospital following an attack. Chris tells Aidan that he did not see who attacked him, but he dealt with a homophobic customer just moments before it happened. Aidan relays the information to Chris's boss, Lucas. While checking Chris's x-rays, Aidan notices he has a broken rib, which is pressing on his lung. He informs Rhys, who tells him to contact Chris immediately. Chris is brought back in and Aidan is assigned to look after him until he is discharged. Aidan takes his car to Fitzgerald Motors for a service and he, Chris and Lucas go out to lunch. Lucas embarrasses the group by trying to find out if Aidan is gay. Aidan later asks Chris out for a drink, but his offer is rejected.

Natasha invites Aidan to an Australia Day barbecue, where he bonds with Chris. While they are playing pool, Chris hits Aidan in the eye with the cue. Vaughn Redden, a Charlie's barman, tends to Aidan's eye and flirts with him. Aidan later goes on a date with Vaughn. A few days later, Aidan overhears Chris talking about asking him out and he agrees to go on a date. Aidan and Chris go to a mini golf course and they get on well. However, Aidan is left disappointed when Chris has to leave early. Chris later explains that he had to help a friend and they arrange to go out again, marking the beginning of their relationship. Aidan organises a charity fun run and has to help Karl Kennedy when he gets cramp. Chris and Aidan help Natasha clean up after she throws a house party. Aidan becomes frustrated with Natasha's behaviour towards Chris and advises him to stand up for himself, as he cannot keep running after her all the time. Aidan goes outside to calm down, which makes Chris think he has ruined the relationship. When Aidan returns, he reassures Chris that they are fine and he spends the night with him. Aidan helps runs a blood drive at the hospital and Chris admits to him that he has not told his parents that they are together. When Aidan learns that Chris has not invited him to a family birthday party, he decides to break up with him.

A few months later, Aidan is on duty when Chris comes to visit Sophie Ramsay (Kaiya Jones), a neighbour who he was involved in a car crash with. Sophie's uncle, Paul Robinson (Stefan Dennis), asks Aidan if Chris was there when he finds the magazines he left. Aidan later finds Chris to see if he is okay and he offers to sneak him back into the hospital. Chris later returns by himself and Paul orders Aidan to call security, however, he changes his mind and allows Chris to stay. Aidan learns Andrew Robinson has been diagnosed with epilepsy and he urges him to tell his father. Chris and Aidan go out for a drink and Chris asks Aidan for a second chance because he has changed. However, Aidan turns him down. Aidan catches Andrew having a funny turn and tells him that needs medication. Andrew later asks Aidan to book him into a clinical trial, but he fails to turn up for it, worrying Aidan. Andrew later asks Aidan for a prescription, but Aidan refuses to give him one. He then finds out that Andrew has taken some medication he bought online and helps him with the dosage. Chris confronts Aidan about spending time with Andrew and Aidan tells him that he is not choosing sides. Andrew decides to have a blood test done, but asks Aidan to list it under a false name and he agrees. Aidan decides that he wants to tell Chris the truth, but Andrew blackmails him into keeping quiet.

When Aidan witnesses Chris defending Andrew and standing up to his father, he realises that he wants to get back together with him. Aidan goes to find Chris at the university dance and asks him if he can change his mind about trying again. Natasha comes to Aidan and reveals that Andrew collapsed and had a fit, so he tries once again to get Andrew to seek help. Natasha is later caught with Andrew's medication and Aidan tells her friends that the pills are for her anxiety. When Andrew's condition is revealed to his family and friends, he apologises to Aidan for blackmailing him. Georgia Brooks (Saskia Hampele) confronts Aidan about a patient file with similar results to Andrew. Aidan admits that the results are Andrew's and he listed them under a false name. He begs Georgia not to tell anyone, but he is later suspended by the hospital board. Aidan lies to Chris that he just got a warning, before going out all night with some friends. Chris expresses his worry about Aidan partying all night, but Aidan decides to go out again. Chris organises a meeting with a union representative, but Aidan lies about going, before rescheduling the meeting. The hospital board later lift his suspension. Chris becomes frustrated with Aidan's habit of refusing help with his problems. When Aidan goes back on his promise to be more open, Chris breaks up with him. Aidan tries to get Chris to change his mind and asks him to move in with him, but Chris turns him down.

== Reception ==
A month after Morley's casting announcement, Bower revealed that she had seen letters from viewers and other members of the public commenting that they were "less than thrilled" about Aidan and Chris becoming a couple. She added "It was incredible that one of the letters said that Bob's character was a nurse and how cliché was that, however it is counterbalanced that the Chris character is a mechanic so some of them are knee-jerk." TV Soap's John Burfitt said Aidan was "hunky" and a "talented nurse". Anthony D. Langford of AfterElton said he liked Aidan from the scenes he had seen, calling him "a funny, interesting guy". Langford was pleased with how Aidan's sexuality was revealed, explaining "Aidan is already out and clearly comfortable with himself and the show has already done the coming out drama with Chris, so there's no need to repeat it." Langford thought Aidan seemed a little old for Chris, but he was looking forward to their scenes together.

In February 2012, Langford revealed that he was concerned that there was no chemistry between Aidan and Chris. He stated "I really don't know why these two are attracted to each other. Chris is a teenage boy who has just come out and is still unsure of himself in many ways. Aiden is an adult with a career, experienced with men and isn't lacking in self-esteem or confidence. They are in different places in their lives, in different worlds in a sense. I'm really not seeing what they have in common that might bring them together." Langford enjoyed the scenes between Aidan and the bartender as they were engaging and fun to watch. A writer for Channel 5 commented that Chris and Aidan's relationship had been "a talking point in the media and fan forums, with devotees of the Aussie soap crushed by the fact that the handsome couple have gone their separate ways."
