= Ramsay Street crash =

Storyline from the Australian soap opera Neighbours

The "Ramsay Street crash" is a storyline from the Australian television soap opera Neighbours, which began on 20 August 2012 when six of the show's teenage characters were involved in a car accident. Executive producer, Richard Jasek, revealed the storyline during a July 2012 interview, stating that the consequences would last for the rest of the year. It was later announced that the storyline would focus on two major causes of road fatalities and injuries among young Australian drivers – distraction and the overloading of cars. In the "Ramsay Street crash" it is peer pressure that decides the character's fate. The cast and crew filmed the crash scenes over two nights at a driver training centre in Melbourne. Planning for the shoot began six weeks beforehand and multiple cameras were used to catch the various angles of the crash. A promotional trailer for the storyline was released on 27 July.

The plot saw the teenage characters; Andrew Robinson (Jordan Smith), Chris Pappas (James Mason), Ed Lee (Sebastian Gregory), Natasha Williams (Valentina Novakovic) and Summer Hoyland (Jordy Lucas) heading to a concert in the city, initially unaware that Sophie Ramsay (Kaiya Jones) has hidden herself in the boot of the car. After discovering Sophie, Chris reluctantly agrees to let her come with them. An argument breaks out, distracting Chris and eventually causing him to lose control of the overloaded car. Andrew is knocked unconscious and Sophie is thrown from the car, while passing Doctor Rhys Lawson (Ben Barber) suffers a career-ending injury to his hand. Later developments saw Chris being sued by Sophie's uncle and Andrew diagnosed with epilepsy. Reception for the "Ramsay Street crash" was positive, with one critic calling it the most dramatic storyline of the year.

== Plot ==
On his birthday, Andrew Robinson (Jordan Smith) receives two cheques for the sale of a mobile app that he helped create along with Natasha Williams (Valentina Novakovic) and Ed Lee (Sebastian Gregory). Andrew attempts to tell Natasha that he sold the app without her knowledge, but decides to wait until the following day. Natasha, Chris Pappas (James Mason) and Summer Hoyland (Jordy Lucas) give Andrew tickets to see The Jezabels in the city that night. Sophie Ramsay (Kaiya Jones) also plans to attend the concert, but her uncle, Paul Robinson (Stefan Dennis), forbids her from going because she has not done her homework. Andrew and his friends meet outside in Ramsay Street to put their belongings in Chris's car and Andrew expresses his unhappiness that Ed is coming along. While the group talk, Sophie sneaks out of her house and gets into the boot of Chris's car unseen.

During the journey, a phone begins ringing, but the group cannot work out whose it is. Ed believes the ringing is coming from the boot, so Chris pulls over to the side of the road. The group discover Sophie in the boot and try and work out what to do with her. Summer suggests that Chris takes her home, while Ed offers to call a taxi and go back with her. Andrew, desperate not to miss the concert, asks Chris to take her in the car, despite knowing that there is not a spare seatbelt. Chris reluctantly agrees and Sophie sits on Summer's lap. Summer asks what time The Jezabels are on stage and Andrew mentions that he wrote it down on his ticket, which is in his wallet inside Summer's bag. As Summer searches for the ticket, she finds the two cheques inside and asks Andrew about them. He tries to get his wallet back, but Summer discovers the cheques are worth $25,000 and Natasha realises he has sold the app.

An argument breaks out between Natasha and Andrew, which Summer and Ed join in on. Ed asks Andrew how he sold the app without Natasha's signature and they all realise that he forged it. Chris struggles to stay focused and asks everyone to calm down, while Natasha wants him to stop the car. She then decides to call the police and Andrew reaches back to stop her, but jostles Chris's arm causing him to lose control of the car. It runs off the road and hits an embankment, before flipping over and coming to a rest upside down. Natasha pulls Ed from the wreckage, while Chris helps a shocked Summer out and then returns to check an unconscious Andrew. On his way home, Rhys Lawson (Ben Barber) drives past the crash site and is flagged down by Natasha. He calls an ambulance and begins assessing everyone. Rhys tells Chris to keep the others warm and awake.

While he is helping Andrew, Rhys cuts his hand on the wreckage. Sophie lies unseen and unconscious in the grass, a few yards from the car. After the ambulances take the others to the hospital, Rhys and a police officer hear a phone ringing and go looking for it. Rhys then finds Sophie and she is rushed to the hospital, where Paul and her sister, Kate Ramsay (Ashleigh Brewer), are waiting. Natasha, Summer and Chris are treated for minor injuries, while Andrew recovers from a serious head injury. Ed has fractured his collarbone and Sophie has a fractured pelvis and internal injuries. Rhys hand is treated by Karl Kennedy (Alan Fletcher) and he tells his girlfriend, Vanessa Villante (Alin Sumarwata), that their trip to Japan is off. Ed wakes up with Natasha by his side and they share their first kiss. Sophie's heart stops, but Karl manages to stabilise her. He then tells Kate and Paul to prepare themselves for the worst.

Chris has his driver's license suspended and Paul later announces that he is suing him. Natasha and Summer state that they blame Andrew for the crash and he is ostracised from the group. Chris attends court where he is given a fine and told that his license will be suspended for six months. He goes to visit Sophie and tells Paul that he will not be pushed around by him, before breaking down at her bedside. Karl realises that Summer has been traumatised by the crash and helps her out by encouraging her to get in another car. He later tells a devastated Rhys that he has suffered severe nerve damage to his hand, as a result of the cut, and there is only a five per cent chance of a full recovery. Andrew suffers from headaches, dizziness and blackouts following the crash. He eventually seeks help and is diagnosed with epilepsy, which he keeps a secret from his friends and family.

A few days after she wakes up, Paul sends Sophie to a rehab clinic in Sydney. Andrew purchases some medication online to control his epilepsy symptoms, which Aidan Foster (Bobby Morley) advises him against taking. Chris is asked by his lawyer to collect witness statements from everyone involved in the crash, but Andrew refuses to give him one. However, Paul is forced to call off the lawsuit when Andrew admits that the crash was his fault. He makes up with Chris, while Summer and Natasha initially keep their distance. Sophie returns from rehab and is able to walk with the help of crutches, but she struggles to be around her friends. She later admits to Chris that she blames herself for the accident, but he states that it was not her fault. Months later, Chris suffers flashbacks to the crash, causing him to admit that he is struggling to get back behind the wheel.

== Production ==
=== Announcement and conception ===
"In the blink of an eye, young lives can be changed forever - brace yourself for a tragedy poised to rock Ramsay Street to its very core..."

— TV Week's Jackie Brygel on the car crash

The executive producer of Neighbours, Richard Jasek, teased the crash storyline during a July 2012 interview with Digital Spy's Daniel Kilkelly. Jasek stated that the show had "a dramatic storyline coming up", which would have consequences that last for the rest of the year. He told Kilkelly, "All I can say is 'the gang shouldn't have gone out that night…'" A writer for Channel 5's Neighbours website later revealed that the storyline would highlight "two of the major causes of road fatalities and injuries among young Australian drivers – distraction and overloading cars." Jasek told the writer that when the team were plotting the story, they were surprised to learn how common it is for younger drivers to be persuaded into allowing more passengers in the car than legally allowed and how easily they are distracted. In the show's storyline it is peer pressure that decides the character's fate. Jasek explained "Ironically the character who is driving is the most responsible of all our teens but succumbs to pressure to allow one too many passengers. It is one of those decisions that at the time seems quite harmless because they're not traveling very far but like real life situations, distance has nothing to do with it."

=== Filming ===
Jasek revealed to TV Week's Jackie Brygel that planning for the "dramatic" episodes began six weeks before the crash scenes were filmed. The shoot took sixteen hours to complete and the scenes were filmed over two nights at Melbourne's METEC Driver Training Centre. James Mason (Chris Pappas) told Brygel that the crew put in a lot of time and effort into getting the scenes right. He revealed that when scenes are usually filmed on location, two cameras are used, but for the crash storyline the crew used five to six cameras at the same time to capture the different angles. He called the shoot "fantastic" and later explained to Inside Soap's Sarah Ellis, "It looked like a movie set, with lots of emergency vehicles, and it was shot at night so the place was lit up like a Christmas tree. We used two identical cars, since we had to virtually destroy one of them." A stunt performer who specialises in car crash scenes also worked on the shoot. Jordy Lucas (Summer Hoyland) commented that being off-site was "pretty exciting" because the cast film everything but the street scenes at the show's Nunawading studio. Jordan Smith (Andrew Robinson) added that filming the scenes affected the cast members, saying "It made us all stop and think. I think we all drove home pretty slowly that night!"

=== Development ===
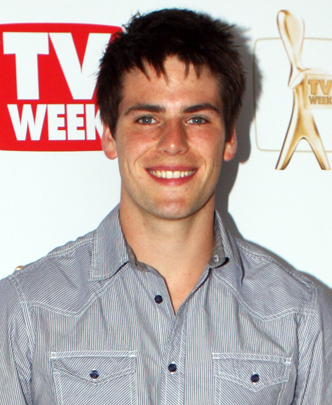
James Mason plays Chris Pappas, the driver of the car.

To celebrate Andrew Robinson's birthday, the Ramsay Street teens decide to attend a concert in the city. Andrew, Natasha (Valentina Novakovic), Summer and Ed (Sebastian Gregory) get into Chris's car earlier in the evening, unaware that Sophie Ramsay (Kaiya Jones) is hiding in the boot, having rebelled against her uncle's decision to forbid her from attending the concert. Halfway into the journey, the group hear a mysterious ringing coming from the back of the car and when Chris pulls over he discovers Sophie hiding in the boot with her phone. Andrew just wants to get to the concert, so he persuades Chris to let Sophie sit on Summer's lap. Chris "reluctantly agrees" knowing that she will not have a seat belt on. Mason revealed "Chris really is a pretty sensible, straightforward kind of guy who knows the rules - his morals are good. The last things he wants to do is jeopardise anyone's safety by doing something silly. But he gets talked into overloading the car by letting Sophie get in with them. He wants to please his friends and make sure everyone's happy - and it doesn't help that the whole group use a bit of peer pressure to convince him. The others just don't see any danger in what they're doing." Shortly after restarting their journey, a heated argument breaks out between Natasha and Andrew when she learns he has sold their gambling app without her permission.

Summer and Ed join in with the argument and there is a lot of shouting. Lucas explained "Summer's aware they've overloaded the car, so she wants to keep calm. She can sense Chris is getting stressed by all the yelling, so she's very tense." As Chris tries to concentrate on the road, Andrew accidentally bumps his arm and he suddenly loses control of the car, which swerves, hits an embankment and flips over before coming to a stop. Sophie is critically injured after being thrown from the vehicle, while Andrew has a serious head injury and Ed is also in a bad way. Rhys Lawson (Ben Barber) comes across the scene and puts his own life at risk to start "frantic" rescue efforts. He cuts his hand in the process, but refuses to get it looked when the emergency services arrive. Rhys eventually finds Sophie and when she reaches the hospital, she is rushed into surgery. A writer for Soap World commented that "a terrified" Natasha is worried Ed will not wake up, before she can tell him she loves him. Mason stated that Chris is wracked with guilt and worried for his friends. Things become worse for him when Paul Robinson (Stefan Dennis) arrives at the hospital and, after learning his son and niece are in a serious condition, threatens to sue him. Mason revealed that Paul is angry and wants someone to pay for what happened, while Dennis explained "Yes, it's typical Paul - someone has to pay and he decides that Chris should take all of the blame before he knows the full story."

Chris is questioned by the police about the accident. Summer and Natasha later admit that they blame Andrew for the crash and he is slowly pushed out of the group. Sophie's condition starts to improve, but she faces "a long recovery" and is sent away to Sydney to receive treatment. The hand injury Rhys sustained forces him to cancel an impending trip to Japan. His girlfriend, Vanessa Villante (Alin Sumarwata) persuades him to have his injured hand examined and he has to undergo minor surgery. Rhys later has some tests performed on his hand and is told that he only has a five per cent chance of a full recovery. Barber revealed "He is devastated - becoming a surgeon is the most important thing to him and he has no plan B. This is a guy who manipulated himself into the surgical programme, it means that much to him." The crash also affects on Andrew's future when he is diagnosed with epilepsy. Andrew begins displaying "worrying neurological symptoms" including; dizziness, severe headaches and black outs. Smith told Brygel "To start with Andrew just ignores the symptoms. He blames them on the crash. He doesn't want to delve into things. But there comes a point where he can't ignore the symptoms anymore." Despite being urged to tell his family and friends about the diagnosis, Andrew tries to deal with it by himself. When Ed eventually wakes up, Natasha "wastes no time" in telling him how she really feels about him and they share a kiss. All About Soap's Claire Crick asked "Could this tragedy finally being them together properly?"

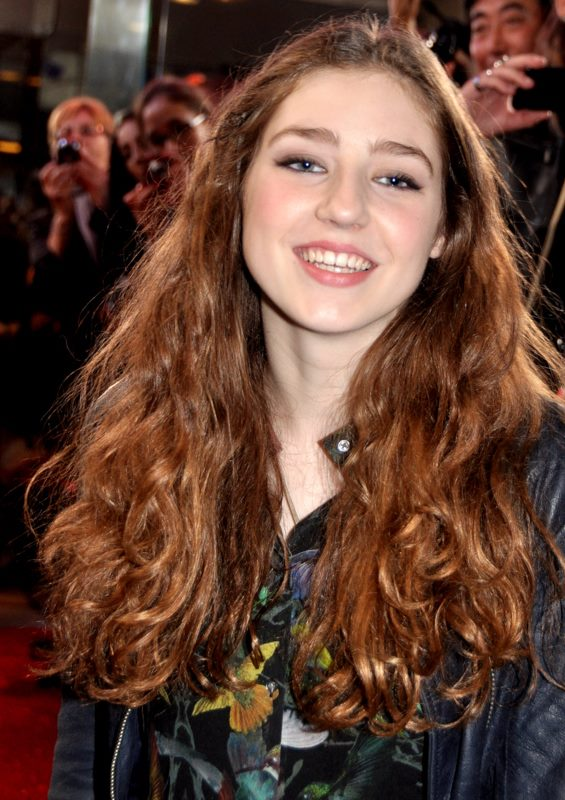
A promotional trailer for the storyline featured a song by Birdy.

== Promotion and broadcast ==
On 27 July 2012, Neighbours released a promotional trailer featuring the six teen characters for the car crash storyline. Birdy's version of "People Help the People" accompanied the trailer and the tagline read "Soon their lives change...forever." A few days later, Neighbours producers released pictures showing the characters in the aftermath of the accident and filming of the car crash scenes. The storyline began airing from 20 August in Australia and from 17 September in the UK.

== Reception ==
Jovita O'Shaughnessy received an Australian Director's Guild nomination for Best Direction in a TV Drama Serial for Episode 6472, which featured the aftermath of the crash. Brygel proclaimed that the Ramsay Street crash was "undoubtedly the most dramatic and shocking Neighbours storyline of the year so far". Sarah Ellis from Inside Soap named the storyline "Nightmare on Ramsay Street" and called the crash "terrifying". Anthony D. Langford from AfterElton stated "I really enjoyed Neighbours this past week. The crash and the aftermath made for some really strong storytelling and I'm surprised at how prominent Chris has been in the storyline." Digital Spy's Daniel Kilkelly branded the crash one of the soap's "biggest episodes of the year".

A reporter from the Sunday Mercury said "What do we think might happen to a car overloaded with teenagers? It crashes, of course, and Sophie is badly injured." Carena Crawford from All About Soap commented "Wow, Neighbours was more than a little bit dramatic today with the big car crash putting Sophie's life in danger – will she survive?" The writer went on to say that the accident would have "far-reaching consequences for everybody" and tried to work out who was to blame, before adding "Whoever's fault it is, we can't wait to see what happens next!" A reporter for the TVTimes stated "With more road accidents in this patch of Oz than anywhere else in the world, Sophie is asking for trouble when she piles into Chris's car, which is already overloaded with teenagers thanks to Andrew egging him on." Dianne Butler, writing for News.com.au, thought the police did "a half-baked investigation into the car crash", enabling Paul to sue Chris. The storyline was included in the Inside Soap Yearbook 2013 as one of "The best bits of September". It was also named "Crash of the month". The crash was nominated for Best Storyline in Digital Spy's end of year reader poll for 2012, it received 5.5% of the vote.
