= Natasha Williams (Neighbours) =

Fictional character in Neighbours

- Neighbours character
- Portrayed by: Valentina Novakovic
- Duration: 2010–2013
- First appearance: 5 May 2010
- Last appearance: 29 March 2013
- Introduced by: Susan Bower
In-universe information
- Occupation: Student; Barmaid and waitress
- Father: Michael Williams
- Mother: Helena Williams
- Grandfathers: Edgar Jovanovic; Robert Williams
- Grandmothers: Angela Jovanovic; Jennifer Williams
- Aunts: Emilia Jovanovic

Natasha "Tash" Williams is a fictional character from the Australian soap opera Neighbours, played by Valentina Novakovic. The role of Natasha was Novakovic's first acting job and she relocated from Sydney to Melbourne for filming. Natasha was introduced to Neighbours along with her father, Michael Williams (Sandy Winton) and she made her debut screen appearance during the episode broadcast on 5 May 2010. In November 2012, Novakovic confirmed that she would be leaving Neighbours and she filmed her final scenes in December. Natasha departed on 29 March 2013.

Natasha has been described as spirited, rebellious and having a burning desire to rule the school. She likes to have all the attention on her and often chooses to rebel so people will notice her. She can also be quite manipulative. Executive producer, Susan Bower said Natasha loves to gossip and wants to be a famous model. She often clashes with Summer Hoyland (Jordy Lucas), who is a feminist and quite the opposite to her. Novakovic stated that Natasha and Summer are "frenemies." The actress also explained that she finds playing Natasha challenging, as her persona is quite different from her own. Novakovic has said that she would like to see Natasha grow up, become nicer and turn over a new leaf. She expressed her desire to portray Natasha's softer and funnier side during an interview with Digital Spy.

Natasha's storylines have mainly focused on her relationship with Andrew Robinson (Jordan Patrick Smith). Novakovic named this storyline as one of her favourites and said that Natasha and Andrew belong together as they bring out the worst in each other. Their relationship led to a complex love triangle involving Summer and later saw Natasha faking a pregnancy to keep Andrew. Natasha casually dates Ivan DeMarco (Ben Knight) and in a bid to appear more mature, she sends him naked photos of herself. They are leaked, causing a scandal amongst Natasha's school friends. Other storylines have seen Natasha trying to achieve her dream of becoming a model, making sure she remains popular at school, coping with her father's relationships and discovering the truth about her mother's death.

== Casting ==
In early 2010, it was announced that three new characters – Doug Harris (Mahesh Jadu), Michael Williams (Sandy Winton) and Natasha Williams –were to join Neighbours in the following months. Novakovic, a performing arts college graduate, was cast in the role of Natasha. The actress had been studying architecture at university, before she chose to move into acting. Shortly after her casting was announced, Novakovic revealed that the role of Natasha was her first acting job and that while she would always be interested in architecture, she really wanted to enjoy the experience on Neighbours. Novakovic moved from Sydney to Melbourne, where Neighbours is filmed, for the role. She is three years older than the character she portrays. In 2011, Novakovic revealed she is still happy with the career choice she made, stating "I enjoy what I'm doing now a lot more than studying, because this is where I want to be. [...] The best thing for me is that I enjoy going to work every day and have some great friends there, including the crew. It's awesome to do something you love every single day."

== Development ==
=== Characterisation ===
"She's very, very confident and always surprises me. But you can sometimes see the softer side of her as well. There are times when you think that she's calmed down – and then she comes back with something outrageous!"

— Novakovic on Natasha (2011)

Before she entered Neighbours, Natasha was described as being "spirited, rebellious and conniving". Channel Five's Holy Soap website described her as being a "teen rebel". After she entered the show, Network Ten described Natasha as having a "major attitude" and a "burning desire to rule the school." They also go on to explain that Natasha never misses an opportunity to be the centre of attention and does whatever it takes to be noticed. However, Natasha really wants to get her father's attention and she chooses to rebel, so that he notices her. TV Soap called Natasha a vixen and Novakovic describes Natasha as being "manipulative" and knowing what she wants.

During an interview, executive producer Susan Bower explained that Natasha is "a teenage troublemaker who is actually really, really clever". Natasha wants to be a famous model, she loves to gossip and she knows how to get the boy's attentions. Bower also added that Natasha and Summer Hoyland (Jordy Lucas) clash because Summer is a feminist who fights for causes, while Natasha is the opposite. Novakovic is fond of the love-hate relationship Natasha shares with Summer and said that they were "frenemies." She further explained, "They're in the same social group at school, and despite the fact that they have so many differences, they're similar in a lot of ways. And Summer is Natasha's only female friend, don't forget."

Natasha's personality began to change and in October 2010, Novakovic said "When she arrived she was full-on, and that was all a part of getting the attention she loves. It's all about knowing that she's liked. But she's more settled now". Novakovic also explained that it is "quite challenging" to play someone so different from herself, but it is fun. She also hoped that she is not as irritating as Natasha in real life and added "I'm not a manipulative teenage girl who's forever wanting everything her own way." In March 2011, Novakovic revealed that she would like to see Natasha become a nicer person, grow up and turn over a new leaf. She said "There are glimpses of the nice girl in Tash." She later said that as she has played the villain for over a year, she would like to show Natasha's "softer, funnier side." Novakovic also hoped that her future storylines could see Natasha's background and her relationship with her mother explored and developed.

In November 2012, Novakovic proclaimed that Natasha was still herself, despite how much she had grown. She explained "It's so much fun to playing such a free spirited character. I like that she's matured and thinks a little clearer now that she is older, but I don't think Tash could ever become boring, no matter how much she matures."

=== Family ===
In order to form the father-daughter bond needed for their respective roles, both Novakovic and Winton introduced each other to their families. The actors spent a lot of time together in order to ensure they were comfortable together on and off screen. Natasha's father, Michael, is a widower and she is his only child. Bower revealed Natasha has her father wrapped around her finger. Michael dotes upon Natasha and Bower opined Natasha causes havoc because he is not strict with her. Winton said he thinks Michael is not handling things with Natasha "too poorly", but she does make things difficult for him. During a 2011 interview with Channel 5, Winton said that Michael and Natasha's relationship had become tortured. Winton stated that Michael wishes Natasha would stop lying to him and hoped she would get her act together, so they could have some semblance of a father/daughter relationship. Winton wanted Michael to build a better relationship with Natasha in the future as he loves her, despite the things she has done.

Following an incident in which Natasha sprays graffiti around Ramsay Street, Michael disowns his daughter and ignores her attempts to get back in his good books. Natasha finds the situation weird and she is hurt by her father's actions. Novakovic said Natasha is disappointed in herself for hurting Michael so much. Natasha responds by taking advantage of her new independence to try to get Michael's attention. She also tries to get back on her father's good side, by doing some housekeeping, but Michael brushes it all aside. Of how Natasha feels about this, Novakovic said "She knows how much her father loves her which is why this is even more jarring, as she realises it must be killing her father to act this way." Natasha and Michael eventually make amends, but it is not an easy journey and they have a lot to work through. Novakovic told Daniel Kilkelly of Digital Spy that the storyline would change Natasha and she would become more sensitive and less self-absorbed.

Bower later teased an upcoming storyline which shows the beginning of Natasha wanting to find out more about her late mother. Bower told Kilkelly that the secret would be revealed in three parts, which would change Natasha and Michael's lives forever." In July 2011, it was announced Natasha's long lost aunt, Emilia (played by Freya Stafford), would be introduced. The Neighbours official website said Emilia's arrival would dig up a lot of secrets and she plays a "pivotal role in Natasha's teenage angst." Novakovic revealed Natasha and Emilia had met before, but Natasha was a toddler and does not remember her. The actress said Natasha and Emilia begin meeting each other in secret and get along well. Novakovic added "Although when Tash mentions her mother, Emilia's reaction is quite strange. But there is so much coming up between these two that all this could change!"

=== Relationship with Andrew Robinson ===
Natasha starts dating Andrew Robinson (Jordan Patrick Smith) and she believes that they are perfect for each other. Novakovic said that they "bring out the worst in each other" and added "I don't think she could find a guy that would tolerate her like Andrew does. She thinks he's the only guy she could possibly be with." Natasha thinks that school and studying is not cool and is happy that Andrew feels the same, until Summer Hoyland joins their class and Andrew becomes interested in his studies. Natasha fears that she could lose her control over Andrew. Summer later asks Natasha if there is anything else, other than the physical aspect, to her relationship with Andrew. Novakovic says that "Natasha is furious, but it does make her stop and think about what she is doing." Natasha does begin to have her doubts about the relationship and she decides to test Andrew, by telling him she wants their relationship to have to be about communicating and understanding each other. Andrew does not take the new direction of the relationship well. Novakovic said that Natasha believes the relationship between her neighbours, Susan (Jackie Woodburne) and Karl Kennedy (Alan Fletcher), is something to be inspired by. She added "That's what she wants to look forward to, but she's getting way ahead of herself. Andrew likes her but he isn't as serious as she is." Novakovic opined that Andrew and Natasha "bring out the worst in each other" and that Natasha's relationship with Andrew had been one of her favourite storylines.

"Will Natasha keep playing her manipulative, selfish game to keep Andrew all to herself or will she let him go to be with the girl he really has feelings for, Summer? Somehow, Natasha does not seem like the type of girl who would go out without putting in a massive fight!"

— Network Ten on the love triangle (2011)

Andrew and Natasha briefly split and she starts dating Kyle Canning (Chris Milligan). Natasha decides to break off the relationship, but Kyle dumps her first. TV Soap said "She's usually the one calling the shots and doing the dumping, but young Natasha is about to find out what it's like on the other side of the fence". They add that Natasha rarely thinks before dropping one guy and moving onto another. Natasha grows bored of Kyle's company, but Kyle also becomes bored with his younger girlfriend and he ends their relationship. Natasha is embarrassed and she lies to Andrew about who ended the relationship first. Natasha and Andrew eventually get back together and Adelaide Now said that thrills Natasha "as she's completely obsessed" with Andrew.

A love triangle between Natasha, Andrew and Summer is formed. Natasha's feelings for Andrew grow when they organise a party together, but she notices Andrew's concern for Summer when she collapses and warns Summer away from Andrew. Natasha later asks Andrew if he loves her, but he does not reply. In December 2010, Summer and Andrew give into their feelings for each other and have sex. Novakovic said Natasha would be "devastated" if she knew what had happened and that she would not let Andrew and Summer off lightly. Andrew tells Natasha that he is going to business meeting, but he meets Summer instead. While they are together in Summer's house, a fire breaks out. Natasha sees the smoke and calls her father and the emergency services before entering the house to rescue Summer, unaware Andrew is also there. Novakovic explained Natasha's ordeal: "Natasha is pulled from the fire by her dad, Michael. Andrew and Summer are rescued separately, and Natasha has no idea of the reason why Andrew was in the house – he was cheating on her with Summer!" After the rescue, Natasha has to come to terms with the fact she will be scarred from a burn she sustains on her neck. Novakovic said that it is a "big deal" for Natasha, as she aspires to be a model and this could ruin her chances. Novakovic also opines that Summer wants nothing more than to be with Andrew, but how can she take him when Natasha tried to save her? Novakovic believed Natasha was blasé to their feelings adding "Deep down, I think Natasha knows that there's something going on, but she doesn't want to admit it to herself. But sooner or later, I reckon she'll have to face the inevitable."

=== Fake pregnancy ===
A couple of months later, Natasha discovers Andrew is cheating on her with Summer. Natasha is hurt and angry and she lies to Andrew about being pregnant. Of Natasha's rash decision, Novakovic explained "She is hurt and the whole cheating thing has really crushed her. She feels like the fool, no one goes behind her back. And she feels they are pitying her because of her injury [the burn she sustained in the fire] and [she] really hates that." Natasha wants Andrew and Summer to feel guilty about betraying her and she wants Andrew for herself. Andrew believes Natasha is pregnant and instead of being with Summer, he decides to stick by Natasha and their baby. Novakovic said that the new storyline is "very exciting" and she could not wait to discover the new developments. Novakovic insisted that Natasha is making the plan up as she goes along. She has not thought it out or how the whole situation might end. Her main goal is to keep Andrew and Summer apart because they betrayed and hurt her. Natasha and Andrew attend a pre-natal class together and they get on quite well. During an interview with Digital Spy, Novakovic explained that Natasha is reminded of why she fell for Andrew in the first place, especially when she sees his gentle side. Because Natasha is getting along well Andrew, there are times when she feels guilty for what she is doing. Natasha does not have any sort of plan to admit the truth as she knows Andrew will be angry.

Novakovic enjoyed filming the storyline because there was so much drama. When she was asked if she had any sympathy for Natasha during filming, she told Digital Spy that she had to because she needed to understand how her character is feeling. Novakovic also hoped viewers would have sympathy for Natasha too. The lie starts to grow out of control and Natasha is forced to make up stories about why she does not want to go to the doctor. She later buys fake ultrasound scan photos over the internet, but Summer becomes suspicious about them and discovers they are from overseas and are fake. Summer realises that Natasha has been lying about being pregnant and reveals the truth in front of Andrew and Natasha's father, shocking Natasha. Andrew does not take the news well and Michael blames himself for his daughter's actions. Novakovic hoped the experience would change Natasha and she would start to grow up. The actress added that Natasha cannot cope by herself and if she continues lying to everyone, they may turn against her.

=== Photo scandal ===
In June 2011, Inside Soap reported that Natasha would "hook up" with Ivan DeMarco (Ben Knight), an older man she meets while out clubbing. A source told the magazine: "Tash sets her sights on somebody who isn't necessarily good for her." They added that Natasha is in a reckless frame of mind, which leads to more conflict with her father. In an attempt to impress Ivan and to show how mature she is, Natasha sends him "raunchy photos" of herself. The Daily Star reported that Ivan would then betray Natasha by showing the pictures to his friends. Natasha's pictures go viral after her "act of recklessness" and TV Week said that her situation should be a lesson to anyone thinking of doing the same. Natasha's classmates find out about the pictures and it causes a scandal at her school. Of the situation, a Neighbours insider told the paper "Tash doesn't think of the consequences when she takes a series of very naughty pictures of herself to send to Ivan. He's more than ten years older than her and she's desperate to keep him interested."

Natasha's father, Michael, discovers what has happened and he is disgusted when he hears the boys at school talking about his daughter. He confronts Ivan, thinking he made Natasha take the pictures, but he is "gutted" when he learns that it was all Natasha's idea. Natasha tries to win her father's favour back and she sprays some unpleasant graffiti about herself around the street, before playing the victim. Natasha enjoys the attention she receives, but when Michael realises what she did, he chooses to disown his daughter and tells her that he does not care what she gets up to. Natasha is left shocked by Michael's decision and does not know what to do about it. Natasha becomes insecure following the photo scandal and Michael's rejection of her and she begins to obsess about improving her appearance. Natasha searches for nose jobs online, before stealing her father's credit card and booking herself in for a procedure.

=== Ed Lee ===
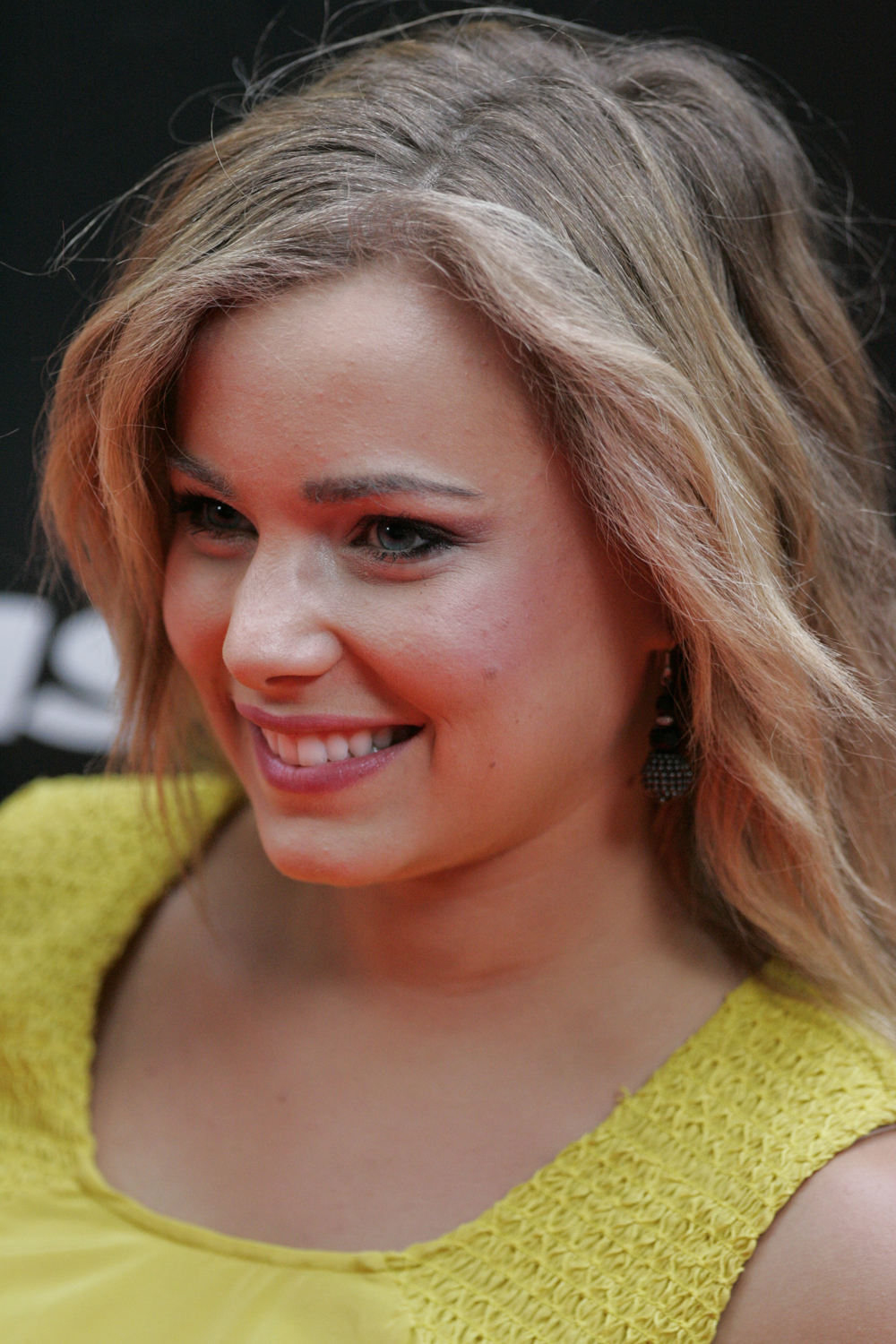
Novakovic stated that she loved exploring every aspect of her character during her time with the soap.

A writer for Channel 5 revealed in March 2012, that Natasha would be introduced to the hobby of LARPing, by a new guy who has "a surprising impact on her". The following month, it was announced that Sebastian Gregory had joined the cast of Neighbours as "maths genius" Ed Lee, Natasha's new love interest. Shortly after she drops out of her arts course at university, Natasha meets Ed in Charlie's. She initially believes he is trying to ask her out on a date, but is embarrassed when she realises that she has misread the signals. Natasha apologises and offers to help him out with a difficult maths equation he has been trying to solve. A writer for All About Soap explained "judgemental Ed dismisses her, assuming the waitress hasn't got much in the brains department!". Natasha solves Ed's equation, proving him wrong and forcing him to apologise to her. Ed then invites Natasha to attend a university maths club, but she leaves at the last minute "refusing to be labelled a nerd." Natasha, Andrew and Ed make an anti-gambling phone app using a maths probability theory and Natasha develops feelings for Ed. While they are celebrating the completion of the phone app, Natasha and Ed embrace and almost share a kiss. However, the moment is ruined when Andrew calls Natasha. Jackie Brygel of TV Week commented "Will beauty and the geek, Tash and Ed, ever get to lock lips?"

=== Departure ===
On 1 November 2012, Novakovic confirmed that she would be leaving Neighbours to pursue acting opportunities in the United States. Of her decision to leave the serial, Novakovic stated "Australia is small compared to what else is out there, especially in Los Angeles. I love acting and it's what I want to do, so why not be in the thick of it all? I certainly love to do more Aussie things but, being realistic, there is nowhere near as much opportunity here." During her first interview since announcing her departure, Novakovic explained that her main reasons for leaving Neighbours were to try other things and explore different characters. The actress said that she had wanted to do two years with the show, but when the time came, she decided to stay for another year to prepare herself to leave.

Novakovic told Kilkelly that she did not have the full details of how Natasha would leave, but said that it would involve "a drive off in a car". She did not mind Natasha leaving the show without a dramatic exit, stating that leaving on good terms would be good. The actress commented that she had loved her character's transition from "bratty" to "almost nice" and believed that Natasha was still herself no matter what she had gone through. Novakovic was pleased that she got to explore every aspect of Natasha and go through every emotion with her. She added that she wanted Natasha to be remembered by the viewers. Novakovic filmed her final scenes in December, but Natasha continued to appear on-screen until 29 March 2013.

== Storylines ==
Natasha models for a PirateNet advertising campaign, where she meets Andrew Robinson and Summer Hoyland. Natasha gets into trouble with her father, Michael (Sandy Winton), after he finds out she lied by saying she was eighteen on the consent form. He threatens to sue the station owner and Andrew's father, Paul Robinson (Stefan Dennis). Natasha and Andrew work together to change the posters, so they are no longer revealing. They then attend a concert together and kiss at the end of the night. Natasha clashes with Summer and starts a rumour that her boyfriend, Chris Pappas (James Mason), bought the basketball team captaincy. Her relationship with her father is strained further when he learns she started the rumour. The schools English teacher, Libby Kennedy (Kym Valentine), discovers Natasha is hiding her maths skills and makes her join the Mathletes as a punishment. Natasha wonders if Andrew is only with her because of her looks and she becomes insecure about their relationship.

Natasha and Andrew break up and Natasha briefly dates Kyle Canning. Natasha discovers that a student in her class is gay and tries to out them, the resulting rumours lead Chris to reveal he is gay. Michael starts dating Ruby Rogers (Yesse Spence) and Natasha tries to sabotage the relationship. She reveals that she does not want to see Michael get hurt. Natasha becomes head of the school social committee and she bullies the other members, in particular Sophie Ramsay (Kaiya Jones), into voting for the things she wants. Natasha notices that Andrew is spending time with Summer and she steals the social money, causing the event to be cancelled. Natasha convinces Andrew to throw a party and they get back together. Michael discovers Natasha took the money and suspends her. Natasha later warns Summer to stay away from Andrew. When she notices Summer's house is on fire, Natasha runs in to rescue her. Michael finds Natasha and they, along with Summer and Andrew, are rescued by firefighters.

Natasha sustains a burn on her neck and she becomes insecure about it. Natasha sees Andrew and Summer kissing, which leaves her devastated. To stop Andrew from breaking up with her, Natasha tells him she is pregnant. Michael, though initially angry, tells his daughter that he will support her. Andrew books Natasha in for an ultrasound scan and after trying to get out of it, Natasha buys fake ultrasound images over the internet. She convinces Andrew not to come into the doctor's office with her and she gives him the fake pictures. Summer reveals the images are fake and Natasha explains that she lied because Andrew cheated on her. Michael tells Natasha that he no longer trusts her and she becomes ostracised at school. Natasha is thrown off the Mathletes team and Lisa Devine (Sophie Tilson) takes her place as the most popular girl in the school. Chris befriends Natasha and she and Summer apologise to each other for their actions. Chris and Natasha try to get Summer and Andrew back together and Natasha successfully challenges Lisa for the Mathletes captaincy.

Feeling lonely, Natasha goes out clubbing and meets Ivan DeMarco (Ben Knight), an older man. Michael discovers the relationship and bans Natasha from seeing Ivan. However, Natasha continues to see him in secret and when Ivan asks her for some naked pictures, she sends him some. Natasha learns Ivan has been showing the pictures to his friends and that they are on the internet. She initially lies to Michael about who took the photos, but Michael learns the truth from Ivan. Natasha becomes desperate to win her father's favour back and she sprays the street with derogatory graffiti about herself. However, Michael discovers she was responsible for the graffiti and he disowns her. After she is taunted about her appearance, Natasha decides to get rhinoplasty and uses Michael's credit card to pay the deposit. Natasha then sells some of her father's records to raise the money and Michael decides to send her to a boarding school. He changes his mind after Natasha nearly drowns in the pool at Number 30 and their relationship begins to improve.

Natasha begins looking for information about her mother, Helena, and learns that her aunt Emilia lives in Australia. Without revealing her identity, Natasha meets Emilia at a fashion shoot. Emilia works out Natasha is her niece and comes to Erinsborough to talk to her. Natasha learns her mother drowned and she demands the truth about her death. Michael reveals that Helena was not a strong swimmer, but she went into the sea to save Natasha. When he became aware of what was happening, he could only save one of them. Michael reassures Natasha that Helena's death was not her fault. Michael collapses and undergoes surgery for a perforated stomach ulcer, causing Natasha to blame herself for his condition. However, she learns that Michael caught Summer cheating on her exam the day he collapsed and falls out with her friends, as they let her blame herself for what happened. After receiving her exam results, Natasha decides to study Contemporary Arts at university.

Michael and Emilia reveal that they are dating and Natasha accepts their relationship. However, when she learns that they were having affair at the time Helena died, Natasha takes Michael's panel van and sets it on fire. Natasha remains angry with her father and after asking him to leave her alone, she learns he has gone to Serbia with Emilia. Natasha throws a house party, but it gets out of control and the street is trashed. When Natasha is fined by the police, she is forced to seek employment to earn some money. She competes with Kate Ramsay (Ashleigh Brewer) for a job at Charlie's and Celeste McIntyre (Cassandra Magrath) gives them both a two-week trial. When Michael informs her that he is selling the house, Natasha tries to put off potential buyers and decides to sabotage Kate's chances of getting the job at Charlie's. Natasha becomes upset when Mason Reeves (Carter Doyle) tries to ask her out, revealing that he saw her pictures online. Jade Mitchell (Gemma Pranita) comforts Natasha and opens up to her about an abusive relationship that she was once in.

Celeste gives Natasha the waitressing job at Charlie's and she moves in with Summer and Karl Kennedy (Alan Fletcher), after her house is sold. Natasha also decides to drop out of her university course, upon realising that it is not right for her. Natasha meets Ed Lee (Sebastian Gregory) at Charlie's and offers to help him solve a maths equation, but he dismisses her. When she solves the problem, he invites her to a maths club. Natasha later transfers to his calculus course and Ed helps her with conditional probability, which they use to predict the outcome of a game of cards. They decide to play a game of Blackjack with a group of guys at Charlie's, but are forced to stop when a couple of police officers walks in. Natasha convinces Ed to hold a game at the Men's Shed, so they can continue to test the theory and make some money. Andrew comes up with an idea to use the theory to make an odds calculator mobile app. When Natasha goes to asks Ed about the idea, he introduces her to the hobby of LARPing, before agreeing to sign Andrew's contract.

Natasha spends more time with Ed and attends a comic swap with him. Shortly before a press conference for the app, Ed finds an error and he and Natasha work together to fix it. While they are celebrating, Natasha and Ed almost kiss. Andrew asks Natasha to talk to a blogger about the app without Ed, which she thinks is wrong. When Ed learns what has happened, he accuses Natasha and Andrew of using him. Natasha tries to apologise, but Ed insists that she and Andrew pay him for his help and then they can go their separate ways. Ed and Natasha eventually make up and she asks him out on a date. Andrew reveals that an offer has been made for the app, but Natasha refuses to sell it. During a car journey to the city with her friends, Natasha learns that Andrew faked her signature to sell the app behind her back and an argument breaks out. Andrew tries to stop Natasha from calling the police and he bumps Chris' arm, causing him to lose control of the car and crash. Natasha frees herself from the car, before pulling Ed from the wreckage.

At the hospital, Natasha blames Andrew for the crash. She learns Ed has a fractured collarbone and sits with him until he wakes up. When he does, Natasha kisses him. They begin dating, but Natasha worries that they do not have much in common. Natasha helps organise a ball for the university and takes an immediate dislike to Ed's vintage suit. She spills coffee on it and then lends Ed a nicer one that she found. Ed realises what she has done and they fight. After apologising to each other, Natasha decides to break up with Ed, as they are too different. When Natasha finds Andrew having a fit in Charlie's, she learns that he has epilepsy. She agrees to keep it a secret. After he collapses, Natasha encourages Andrew to go to the hospital for tests. Before he can leave, he suffers a fit in front of Paul. Andrew initially blames Natasha for causing the fit when Paul takes Charlie's away from him. She then helps him to convince Paul to change his mind. Natasha and Andrew begin dating again in secret. They later decide to tell everyone and Summer reveals that she already knew and does not mind. Natasha later finds an old email from Andrew proclaiming his love for Summer and she begins to worry about her relationship with him. However, Andrew reassures her that he loves her and their relationship is different this time around. Natasha asks Andrew to take a month of celibacy, but they end up breaking it early. Natasha quits university and tells Andrew that she is leaving Erinsborough to travel around Europe. She asks Andrew to come with her and he agrees. They leave the following day with Paul's blessing.

== Reception ==
For her portrayal of Natasha, Novakovic was included on the long list for the 2011 Most Popular New Talent Logie Award. A writer for Holy Soap said Natasha's most memorable moment was "Showing she could be a heroine as she rushed to rescue her friends from the Ramsay Street fire." Virginia Blackburn of the Daily Express nicknamed Natasha and Andrew "The Swot and The Slug" after learning about Natasha's talent for Maths. A reporter from The Sun-Herald branded Natasha a "teen rebel", while a TV Soap columnist stated that she was the new Izzy Hoyland of Neighbours. Michelle Duff of The Dominion Post called Natasha a "blonde-haired vixen." Duff also used Natasha's fake pregnancy storyline as an example of how life in Ramsay Street is more "melodramatic" than life in a real street. Laura Morgan from All About Soap said she enjoyed Natasha's fake pregnancy storyline, saying "We love nothing more than a fake pregnancy to shake things up a bit!" A writer for Channel 5 proclaimed the storyline was "arguably one of the soap's most jaw-dropping revenge plots."

Holy Soap ran a poll on who Andrew should be with and 16,000 votes were cast, with 92% of viewers choosing Summer over Natasha. In June 2011, a Daily Record reporter called Natasha a "wayward teen" and said her relationship with Ivan was likely to end in tears. In August 2011, Anthony D. Langford of AfterElton commented "the show really needs a new direction for Tash. Her endless stunts and tricks are kind of boring at this point. Tash is a likeable character, and I love her friendship with Chris. But this character needs some growth and a new direction. And perhaps a love interest as well." Langford later said Natasha just simply asking Aidan Foster (Bobby Morley) if he was gay or straight was "so in character that you weren't shocked when she did it." All About Soap's Claire Crick praised Natasha's reaction to finding out that Michael and Emilia were having an affair at the time of her mother's death, saying "we can't help but love her rebellious revenge!" Crick explained "After being in the dark about her mum's death all her life, you can't blame Tash for lashing out, especially when she assumed that her dad was keeping things secret to protect her...when in actual fact he was just protecting his own sordid secret!" She added that she could not wait to see what happens next, "especially if it involves more from the tearaway teen – go, Tash!" A Channel 5 website writer commented that Natasha was "one of Neighbours' most colourful and controversial characters".
