= Vanessa Villante =

Fictional character from Neighbours

- Neighbours character
- Portrayed by: Alin Sumarwata
- Duration: 2012–2013, 2015, 2019
- First appearance: 14 March 2012
- Last appearance: 11 March 2019
- Introduced by: Susan Bower (2012); Jason Herbison (2015)
In-universe information
- Occupation: Chef and waitress
- Father: Tony Villante
- Mother: Francesca Villante
- Husband: Alek Pocoli (until 2013); Lucas Fitzgerald
- Children: 3
- Sons: Patrick Villante
- Daughters: Sebastiana

Vanessa Villante is a fictional character from the Australian soap opera Neighbours, played by Alin Sumarwata. The actress's casting was announced on 5 December 2011, though she began filming the week before. Sumarwata and her family relocated to Melbourne and purposely moved near to the studio, so she could manage work and be close to her daughter. The actress stated that she was excited about the role, while the show's executive producer Richard Jasek commented "She's a wonderful actor and we think her character has so many exciting possibilities for us." Sumarwata made her debut screen appearance as Vanessa during the episode broadcast on 14 March 2012.

Before her arrival on screen, Vanessa was described as someone who embraces life to the full. She is Italian and a professional chef. A TV Week writer called Vanessa "volatile", while an Inside Soap columnist said was "fiercely independent". Sumarwata described her character as being someone who wears their heart on their sleeve. The actress stated that Vanessa's background would be explored in the future, adding a new dimension to the character. Vanessa's early storylines focused on a one-night stand with Lucas Fitzgerald (Scott Major), which resulted in pregnancy. Sumarwata thought the storyline was a great way to get viewers talking about the character.

Producers soon established a relationship between Vanessa and Rhys Lawson (Ben Barber). The character's mother was also introduced, leading to a sham wedding storyline. Vanessa gives birth to a son and reunites with Lucas. In August 2013, it was revealed that Sumarwata had been written out, and she departed alongside Major on 24 September, as their characters moved to the countryside. Sumarwata has reprised her role for various guest returns with Major. They returned for the show's 30th anniversary celebrations on 4 March 2015. She then appeared in additional episodes and departed the show on 16 November 2015. Sumarwata made a one episode appearance as Vanessa on 11 March 2019.

== Casting ==
On 5 December 2011, Daniel Kilkelly of Digital Spy reported Sumarwata had joined the cast of Neighbours as regular character, Vanessa Villante. Sumarwata relocated to Melbourne from Sydney with her husband and their young daughter, and she filmed her first scenes the week before her casting announcement. She told Kilkelly "Everything happened so quickly and it coincided with the move from Sydney - it was very chaotic at first and it did take a while. I felt I was coming to work, then dashing back to the baby between scenes - very full on! However, now I feel settled and I know what to expect." The actress explained that she and husband deliberately moved close to the studio where Neighbours is filmed, so she could work and be close to her daughter. Sumarwata said she was "very excited" about her new role, while executive producer Richard Jasek quipped "We're thrilled to bits that she's joined the cast. She's a wonderful actor and we think her character has so many exciting possibilities for us." Sumarwata made her first screen appearance as Vanessa on 14 March 2012.

== Development ==
=== Characterisation ===
Vanessa is of Italian heritage and a professional chef. Sumarwata revealed that she shares a similar love for food with her character. Of Vanessa, a writer for Channel 5 stated "Anything but a wallflower, it seems that Vanessa will cook up a storm in more than one sense of the word, embracing life to the full and turning the world on its head for one of Ramsay Street's male residents." A reporter for TV Week said Vanessa was "volatile" and they described her as "a temptress" and "a glamazon". The writer added that Vanessa's emotions "are always simmering at the surface" and she would set pulses racing among the men of Erinsborough. An Inside Soap writer described Vanessa as being "fiercely independent". When asked to describe her character by Digital Spy's Daniel Kilkelly, Sumarwata stated "She is impulsive, excitable and doesn't let much get her down and wears her heart on her sleeve." Sumarwata told Kilkelly that exploration of Vanessa's background was in the pipeline and that it would add a new dimension to her. She said that some parts would surprise the Ramsay Street residents, while others would be embraced and questioned.

=== Family ===
Vanessa is one of five children who were born to strict Catholic parents. A writer for Channel 5 explained that while Vanessa loves her family, she has occasionally felt lost among her siblings. Vanessa's "formidable" mother, Francesca (Carmelina di Guglielmo), was introduced in October 2012. Vanessa was initially rattled by her mother's appearance and tried to cover up the fact she is pregnant to avoid being berated by her. However, her secret is revealed when Francesca overhears a conversation between Vanessa and her neighbour, Chris Pappas (James Mason). Sumarwata stated "Vanessa planned to turn up on her mum's doorstep after the baby was born, so that all the shame, blame and judgement about getting pregnant before marriage would just dissolve when the family saw the baby." Francesca was "shocked" to learn her daughter was having a baby out of wedlock.

Sumarwata told Kilkelly that she was excited to learn that Vanessa's mother was being brought into the series, as it meant that there would be some exploration of her background. Of Francesca's relationship with Vanessa, the actress revealed "The woman is so overbearing and doesn't give Vanessa any credit at all. It's pretty clear that their relationship has been strained for quite a while, which is why Vanessa left the family and there has been very little contact. Can you blame her for staying away?" She further explained that Vanessa's family are strict Catholics, so having a baby out of wedlock was not acceptable. Vanessa became "petrified" when Francesca threatened to cut her out of the family if she did not get married. She agreed to go along with her mother's plans because she does not want to bring up her child without her family around her.

=== Lucas Fitzgerald and pregnancy ===
A TV Week writer revealed that Vanessa would become a love interest for one of the male characters and that she would turn his world "upside down and more." Vanessa's first storyline saw her have a one-night stand with Lucas Fitzgerald (Scott Major). A columnist for TV Week said Vanessa makes an instant impression on Lucas and she goes back to his house. The following morning Vanessa cooks breakfast for both Lucas and his housemate, Lou Carpenter (Tom Oliver). Vanessa then does "a disappearing act", but she returns a few weeks later to tell Lucas that she is pregnant with his child. Vanessa appears on Lucas's doorstep just as he brings home another woman. Of how Vanessa breaks the news to Lucas, Sumarwata explained "She is determined to reveal her news. She believes that no matter what Lucas's reaction is, he deserves to know she is carrying his child. She has no ill feelings towards him and tries to be as easy-going as possible by bringing up casual and random topics of conversation. But before Lucas can guess what the news could be, the words from Vanessa hit him like a tonne of bricks." Lucas then questions Vanessa about how she can be certain the baby is his and Sumarwata stated that it was not the response Vanessa imagined.

Lucas is upset when he learns Vanessa has decided to start a new life for herself and their unborn child in Erinsborough. He does not accept his new responsibilities towards Vanessa and the baby. Vanessa tries to find employment as the head chef at Lassiter's Hotel, infuriating Lucas. He then tells her potential employer, Paul Robinson (Stefan Dennis), that she is pregnant costing her the job. Speaking to a writer from Channel 5's Neighbours website, Sumarwata said that playing a pregnant character brought back memories of her own pregnancy. Vanessa is seen suffering from severe morning sickness and Sumarwata commented that she also suffered with nausea just from the smell of food. She commented "It is a bit like déjà vu and certainly helps to understand why Vanessa can be a little scary at times." The actress also revealed that to portray Vanessa's condition she had to wear a false stomach and added that the one consolation with the pregnancy was that she could take it off at the end of the day. Sumarwata told Kilkelly that she was initially unaware of how significant the storyline would be, but thought that it was a great way to get viewers talking about her character. Lucas eventually becomes more supportive of Vanessa and the baby. Sumarwata observed that Vanessa begins to feels more settled because of this and she starts to understand Lucas better.

"I think Rhys challenges her and there is definitely a passion between them. I'm not sure if there will ever be that passion with Lucas."

— Sumarwata on which love interest is more suited to Vanessa (2012)

=== Relationship with Rhys Lawson ===
When Vanessa is admitted to hospital with severe morning sickness, she is treated by Rhys Lawson (Ben Barber). Rhys believes Lucas is not "pulling his weight" with Vanessa and the baby and he starts looking out for her. Rhys helps Vanessa lift some heavy boxes and she offers to show him how to bake a cake to say thank you. A columnist for All About Soap observed "While Vanessa sees it as mates having fun, it's clear Rhys has got it bad!" Rhys later returns to spend more time with Vanessa, which unnerves Lucas. Jason Herbison, writing for Inside Soap, commented that Rhys may have met his match in Vanessa, while Barber said that her feistiness appeals to his character. He stated "He finds her attractive, and she takes the mickey out of him - that's good for Rhys. He needs to be knocked off his pedestal! Vanessa also exposes a rare vulnerability in Rhys, so there's a risk he could get hurt and lash out in other ways." The actor added that Rhys is attracted to Vanessa because of her "fire and passion" and that she does not play games. He also thinks Vanessa is someone he can trust and is not deterred by the fact she is pregnant with another man's child.

Of how Vanessa feels about Rhys, Sumarwata revealed "She has been quite torn and also not sure of his motives in these very unusual circumstances. She is definitely attracted to him but she is still guarded." When Vanessa witnesses Rhys shouting at their neighbour Susan Kennedy (Jackie Woodburne), she thinks that she could end up in a similar situation in the future and she is scared by that. Sumarwata told Kilkelly that after Rhys opens up to Vanessa in a bid to fix things, she feels relieved. Vanessa and Rhys eventually give into their attraction for one another and share a kiss in the kitchen at Harold's Store. Barber commented that his character enjoys making the first move, so he is the one who goes in for the kiss. When asked if Rhys and Vanessa make a strong couple, Sumarwata observed that the baby is a big hurdle for them to cross and intellectually she did not think they were on the same level. The actress added "He is ambitious, whereas she is happy with her lot. I think it's too early to say how they will fare in the future."

When Rhys is offered a three-month work placement in Japan, he tries to convince Vanessa to go with him. Barber revealed that his character puts his heart on the line, but is devastated when Vanessa says no. Rhys is determined not to give up and he is "thrilled" when Vanessa changes her mind. Barber commented "They're very much in love and Rhys is thrilled when Vanessa does say yes." Shortly before Rhys and Vanessa's departure to Japan, Rhys' mother, Elaine (Sancia Robinson), gives her "seal of approval" to her son's relationship with Vanessa by giving him an engagement ring. Sumarwata told TV Week writers Jackie Brygel and Erin Miller that Vanessa is not aware that Rhys is contemplating proposing to her. The actress believed that Vanessa would probably laugh if Rhys proposed and then double-check that it was not a joke. Sumarwata added "She's really attracted to Rhys's drive and, after meeting his mum, now understands the reason behind that drive. That's the most beautifully heartbreaking thing about Rhys's story." The couple later break up, but Sumarwata revealed that Vanessa still loved Rhys "deeply", but thought that it was bad timing for them. She added "In other circumstances, I think they would be great together, they balance each other."

=== Sham wedding ===
On 25 October 2012, it was revealed that Vanessa, Lucas and Rhys would be involved in a sham wedding plot. When her mother comes to visit, Vanessa is pleased that Lucas manages to win her approval, but her relief is short-lived when Francesca insists that they get married. Jackie Brygel from TV Week observed that Vanessa did not expect Lucas to agree to Francesca's demand, but he surprised her with his "willingness" to go along with a sham wedding. However, she remained unaware that he had developed genuine feelings for her and was hoping that by getting married, she would fall in love with him, too. Sumarwata explained that Vanessa was still in love with Rhys and being with Lucas was the last thing she was thinking about. When asked what to expect in the lead up to the wedding, Sumarwata told Kilkelly "Well you have a bride who doesn't want to be there, a mother who desperately needs a wedding, a groom who knows that the bride is hanging by a thread, and a lover who wants to prove he should be with the bride!"

In the lead up to the wedding, Vanessa struggles with her mother's expectations and she also fails to convince Father Guidotti (John Orcsik) that she wants to marry Lucas. Rhys also causes problems when he senses that Vanessa still loves him and challenges her to call off the wedding. However, when he does not admit his own feelings for her, Vanessa decides to go ahead with the wedding. When she learns that her father is not attending the ceremony because he is ashamed of her getting pregnant out of wedlock, Vanessa briefly thinks about cancelling. The wedding scenes were filmed in July in a historic chapel. A writer for Channel 5 commented that while the producers were "remaining tight-lipped" about the outcome to the wedding, there would be a surprise twist. During the wedding, Rhys' appearance at the church "rattles" Vanessa and she struggles to get through her vows. Vanessa then stops the wedding and runs out of the church, leaving Lucas at the altar.

=== Departure ===
During an interview with Digital Spy's Daniel Kilkelly in August 2013, Sumarwata's former co-star Sachin Joab revealed that she had been written out of Neighbours. Joab told Kilkelly that "every single multicultural full-time actor on the show" had been written out during the first year of their full-time contracts. He stated that Jasek decided to let go of four actors hired by the former producer Susan Bower. News of Sumarwata's exit came shortly after Major also departed the show. Sumarwata confirmed her departure during a feature in TV Week. Of her exit, she said that while it was not her choice to leave, there could have been worse endings. Sumarwata admitted that she had a feeling her character would be axed when ten regular characters were introduced during her time on the show. She added "They gave us six months' notice, but the thought of saying goodbye to the cast and crew never got easier." Jasek commented that Vanessa could return in the future. Vanessa departed with Lucas on 24 September 2013.

=== Returns ===
On 28 November 2014, it was announced that Sumarwata had reprised her role as part of Neighbours' 30th anniversary celebrations in March 2015. Vanessa returned with Lucas, pregnant once more. Sumarwata was pleased to be returning to the show with Major for the anniversary. She said "For a couple that went through so much tragedy and heartache, it's so nice to see a happy ending for Lucas and Vanessa, and adding to their family which is growing rapidly." Vanessa returned in September 2015, and again from 10 November. Sumarwata reprised the role in late 2018 to film scenes for Sonya's exit storyline in 2019. Of her return, she commented "No way would I have not been there for it". Vanessa appears with Lucas at Sonya's memorial on 11 March 2019.

== Storylines ==
Vanessa meets Lucas Fitzgerald in Charlie's and they have a one-night stand. The following day, Vanessa assures Lucas that she is not looking for a serious relationship. A month later, Vanessa returns and tells Lucas that she is pregnant. Lucas offends Vanessa when he asks if the baby is his and she quickly leaves. She tells Sonya Mitchell (Eve Morey) that she is glad she is on her own. Vanessa is interviewed by Paul Robinson for a job at Lassiter's Hotel. When Paul learns of her pregnancy from Lucas, he offers the job to someone else. Lucas's housemate Kate Ramsay (Ashleigh Brewer) invites Vanessa to move in when she discovers Vanessa is sleeping in her car. Vanessa finds employment at Harold's Store. She is briefly hospitalised with severe morning sickness. Vanessa impresses Rhys Lawson with her cooking and they being spending time together. Lucas attends Vanessa's first scan and their relationship improves. Rhys and Vanessa begin dating, and Rhys introduces Vanessa to his mother, Elaine (Sancia Robinson).

When Number 24 is put up for sale, Lucas buys Number 32 for Vanessa and the baby. Vanessa agrees to accompany Rhys on a three-month work placement in Japan. However, their trip is cancelled when Rhys badly injures his hand, which affects his career as a surgical intern. Vanessa stands by Rhys when he becomes depressed. Rhys later admits that he has altered his test results, so he can assist in surgeries. Vanessa tells his superior and Rhys blames her for ending his surgical career. They break-up. Vanessa's mother, Francesca, visits and Vanessa tries to hide her pregnancy. When Francesca finds out, she insists that Vanessa and Lucas get married. During the ceremony, Vanessa struggles with her vows and flees the church. Francesca disowns Vanessa when she says she does not love Lucas. Rhys tries to win her back, but Vanessa rejects him. She then realises that Lucas loves her. Rhys takes Vanessa to the hospital when she goes into labour. He stays with her while she gives birth and when he proposes, Vanessa accepts.

Vanessa reconciles with her mother and she and Lucas name their son, Patrick (Lucas MacFarlane). Patrick is diagnosed with Ebstein's anomaly and has to undergo surgery. Vanessa ends her engagement to Rhys and tells Lucas she loves him. Rhys dies and Vanessa spends time with his mother. Patrick undergoes a second surgery, before Vanessa and Lucas bring him home. Lucas's ex-partner, Stephanie Scully (Carla Bonner), returns to town and Vanessa befriends her. But she is hurt when Lucas tells Steph that he has testicular cancer first. Lucas proposes and Vanessa accepts. Steph uses manipulation to cause tension between Lucas and Vanessa. When Lucas learns Vanessa was previously married, he calls off the wedding and Vanessa goes to stay with her parents. On her return, she asks Lucas to cut Steph out of his life, so they can repair their relationship. Steph kidnaps Patrick and Vanessa blames Lucas. He manages to find Steph and rescue Patrick.

Lucas buys an apartment at Lassiter's and decides to sell Number 32. Vanessa struggles with the idea of making their tenants, Lauren (Kate Kendall) and Matt Turner (Josef Brown) homeless. Vanessa discovers she is pregnant again, which puts further strain on their finances. Lucas begins gambling, making Vanessa doubt her love for him. Her first husband Alek Pocoli (Damian De Montemas) tells her they are still married and he gives Vanessa $100,000 for a quick annulment, meaning she and Lucas can keep Number 32. They realise that they cannot get married, as Vanessa's annulment would not be completed in time. But Lucas suggests they hold a commitment ceremony instead. Vanessa and Lucas receive offers for their Lassiter's apartment and his business. They sell up and move to Daylesford, where Vanessa gives birth to their daughter Sebastiana.

Vanessa and Lucas return for the Erinsborough Festival and they bring Sebastiana (Izabella Anderson) with them. They catch up with Toadie and Chris, who tells them he is going to be a father. They return to Daylesford afterwards. After Lucas buys back Fitzgerald Motors, Sonya suspects that Lucas is gambling again. Vanessa explains to her that she sold a cupcake recipe to a bakery, but they had to keep it a secret as they signed a non-disclosure agreement. Vanessa gets Sonya and Lucas to make up. While passing through Erinsborough, Vanessa agrees to meet with Steph for the first time since Patrick's kidnapping. Steph tells Vanessa that nothing like that will ever happen again and she explains about her treatment. When Steph mentions that her son called her, Toadie reveals that it was not possible and Vanessa suspects Steph is still unwell. The following day, Steph returns to apologise for her behaviour, but Vanessa tells that Toadie's belief is the only reason she has her job at the garage. Vanessa then asks Steph not to contact her or Lucas again. After Toadie and Steph learn that Vanessa made enquires at the hospital about Steph's condition, they confront her. Steph accuses Vanessa of trying to cause her another psychotic break. After calling Lucas, Vanessa tells Steph that they have decided to end her trial period at the garage. Vanessa and Lucas return to Erinsborough for Sonya's memorial, after she dies from ovarian cancer.

== Reception ==
When asked by Jason Herbison of Inside Soap which new character viewers should be looking out for, Jasek chose Vanessa, saying she would take Erinsborough by storm. TV Week's soap critic Andrew Mercado branded Vanessa a "sexy chef", while Cameron Adams of the Herald Sun called her "a stone-cold fox". A writer for Channel 5 proclaimed that she was a "fiery newcomer". A Huddersfield Daily Examiner reporter stated Vanessa had proved to be "the bane of Lucas' existence". While a Daily Record soap opera columnist observed that she had "certainly made an impact since turning up in Erinsborough." When asked how fans have reacted to Vanessa, Sumarwata revealed "I guess it is still early days, however I gather from Neighbours' digital department - who look after the website and social media - fans are really liking her, which is great considering she arrived with no back-story." A writer from TV Magazine said that Vanessa and Lucas lead "complicated lives" and that their situation is "all a bit of a mess". The writer added that their "bizarre relationship" became more complex when Vanessa pretended to be Lucas' sister in one storyline.

Brygel and Miller from TV Week called Rhys and Vanessa "Ramsay Street's hottest couple". Kerry Barrett from All About Soap revealed that the magazine's writing team loved Vanessa and thought she might be magical. Barrett explained "How lovely is Neighbours' cupcake queen Vanessa Vilante [sic]? Here at All About Soap, we love the feisty mum-to-be – and we've got a little theory about her. Crazy as it sounds we think there's something a bit magical about voluptuous Van. She's sparkled her way into the hearts of the Ramsay Street residents, spreading happiness and sugary treats wherever she goes – and she's changed the lives of just about everyone she's met." Barrett went on to write that Vanessa had changed Lucas and Rhys for the better and wondered who would be next on her list. She added "Whatever she does, it's going to be magic!" The Herald Sun's Dianne Butler commented "And delicious cakes notwithstanding, is Vanessa a bit of a cow?." All About Soap's Carena Crawford opined that Vanessa and Lucas were a "mismatched pair" and she really did not think it was a good idea for them to get married. In 2015, a Herald Sun reporter included Vanessa's return in their "Neighbours' 30 most memorable moments" feature.
