= Rhys Lawson =

Character from Australian soap opera "Neighbours"

- Neighbours character
- Portrayed by: Ben Barber
- Duration: 2011–2013
- First appearance: 13 July 2011
- Last appearance: 20 March 2013
- Introduced by: Susan Bower
In-universe information
- Occupation: Doctor at Erinsborough Hospital
- Father: Eddie Lawson
- Mother: Elaine Lawson

Rhys Lawson is a fictional character from the Australian soap opera Neighbours, played by Ben Barber. The actor's casting was announced on 18 May 2011 and he began filming his first scenes the week before opposite established cast members Alan Fletcher (Karl Kennedy) and Jackie Woodburne (Susan Kennedy). Barber said he loved his character and was looking forward to what was ahead. He made his debut screen appearance on 13 July 2011. In November 2012, it was announced that Barber would be leaving Neighbours and Rhys made his last screen appearance on 20 March 2013.

Before his arrival on screen, Barber described Rhys as being determined and focused, while Daniel Kilkelly of Digital Spy said his arrival would cause a stir. Rhys is ambitious, persuasive and manipulative. His profile on the official Neighbours website states that he believes Erinsborough is "a bit of a backwater", while he is more of a city guy. Rhys is an enthusiastic young doctor and often riles his colleague, Karl, in his quest to become a surgeon. He wants to succeed and can justify why he does certain things, which hurt other people. Rhys is good at separating his work life from his home life and he knows how to have a good time. Barber revealed that Rhys does have a sensitive side and he can mean well.

One of the character's earliest storylines saw him becoming caught up in Karl and Susan Kennedy's marital problems, while treating their friend, Jim Dolan (Scott Parmeter). Rhys was with Jim when he died and he remained affected by his death for a long time. Rhys had a one-night stand with Kate Ramsay (Ashleigh Brewer), which left Kate feeling awkward around him. Rhys became determined to join the hospital's surgical training programme and was devastated when he missed out on a place. Rhys then romantically pursued Erin Salisbury (Elise Jansen) and through his manipulative behaviour he forced her to quit the programme. Exploration of the character's backstory began after his mother was introduced and Barber believed this would allow the audience to see why Rhys has become who he is.

== Casting ==
On 18 May 2011, it was announced Barber had joined the cast of Neighbours as Rhys Lawson. His casting announcement came as the show lost regular cast member Scott McGregor (Mark Brennan). Barber was appearing in a small guest role in fellow Australian soap opera Home and Away when he was given the role of Rhys. He began filming his first scenes for Neighbours opposite Alan Fletcher (Karl Kennedy) and Jackie Woodburne (Susan Kennedy) the week before his casting announcement. Of appearing in Neighbours, the actor told Matt Neal of The Warrnambool Standard "I catch myself and have a moment where I realise that I'm working with actors I watched on TV growing up. My first scenes were with Alan and Jackie. It was great to have them there to help out and show me how it's done. I was in safe hands." Barber revealed he loved his character and was looking forward to what was ahead. He made his first on screen appearance as Rhys in July 2011.

== Development ==
=== Characterisation ===
"Rhys is a real city guy, and thinks Erinsborough is a bit of a backwater. He is career focused, driven and determined to be a surgeon — and he doesn't care who he has to tread on to get there."

— Eleven on Rhys

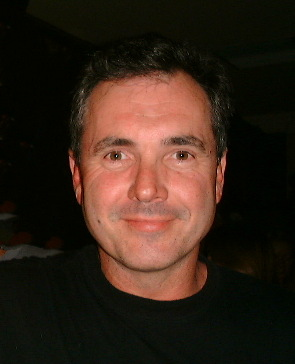
Alan Fletcher plays Rhys' colleague and "career rival", Karl Kennedy.

Shortly after his casting was announced, Barber told a reporter for the Herald Sun that he loved his character and said his determination and focus would get him into trouble. Daniel Kilkelly of Digital Spy said Rhys's arrival would cause a stir in Erinsborough and may not go down well with some of the local residents. Barber also called Rhys ambitious and said that while he is not a villain, he is not an entirely good guy either. The actor explained "He rides that line and that's a lot of fun to play. There are a lot of different dynamics. He can be very persuasive, bordering on manipulative, but he has a sensitive side as well, which is coming out gradually." Barber told a writer for Inside Soap that Rhys is good at separating his work life from his home life, and can easily switch from one to the other. Barber quipped that Rhys knows how to have a good time, while the official Neighbours website said he considers himself "a bit of a ladies' man". A Herald Sun reporter said Rhys would "rile" his colleague, Karl Kennedy. Alan Fletcher, who plays Karl, revealed that his character and Rhys would share many scenes. Fletcher explained that it can be "somewhat galling" for Karl to be faced with Rhys, who is an enthusiastic young doctor. The actor added "So expect some fun confrontation but also cleverly the writers have explored what Rhys and Karl might have in common."

When asked what advice he would give to his character, Barber said "Unfortunately, I don't think he would listen to me in the first place, but if he could give me the time of day, I would say lighten up on the control because you’re never going to have it." Speaking to Channel 5, Barber revealed Rhys would not do a lot to redeem himself in the new year, but viewers would get learn more about his back story, which could explain his dark side. During a 2012 interview with Kilkelly, Barber said his character is good at getting what he wants, saying "I think at the end of the day, he just wants to win and he has this ability to justify why he does things, and if people are hurt in the process, it's their fault. His vision is the one that is most important." Barber said that deep down, Rhys is sensitive and he means well. When asked about the reaction Rhys has received from viewers, Barber believed they liked the character as he is unpredictable and manipulative. He added that the viewers are interested in seeing what Rhys does next. When asked how he felt about playing a bad boy by DNA's Matthew Myers, Barber revealed that he loved it, saying "It's always exciting getting the scripts because I never know which way they are going to turn or who I'm going to be turning on!" The actor quipped that he is always wondering which character he is going to manipulate or "screw over" next and added "But at the core of things Rhys has a heart of gold."

=== Family ===
Rhys' mother, Elaine (Sancia Robinson), was introduced in November 2011. Barber revealed in his interview with Kilkelly that their backstory would be explored and stated that it would explain "a lot more about why Rhys is the way he is". He added that there would be "a big revelation" about Elaine coming up. Elaine suffers from a degenerative spinal condition and has to use a wheelchair. Rhys was forced to care for her when his father ran out on them both. Rhys tries to keep his life on Ramsay Street separate from his family, so when Elaine asks him if she can spend Easter with him, he makes up excuses as to why she cannot visit him. Barber revealed to an Inside Soap writer that Elaine realises Rhys is lying to her and she starts to wonder if he is ashamed to be seen with her. Rhys' actions when his housemates arrive appear to confirm his mother's suspicions. While they wonder who Elaine is, he makes up an excuse. Barber explained "Rhys pretends he's visiting one of his patients. Elaine is really hurt and embarrassed when he comes out with that. He realises, and feels terrible."

Rhys tries to make things up to Elaine by taking her to the hospital to meet his colleagues, but when she questions his motives for "going public" and admitting who she is, Rhys has to look at himself and his attitude towards her. In a May 2012 interview with Inside Soap's Jason Herbison, Barber said he liked the fact that Rhys' mother had been introduced and that he had the chance to learn more about his character's background. He expressed his wish of having Rhys' father introduced in the future, saying "Rhys doesn't have a good relationship with him, as his dad abandoned the family when he was younger. It would certainly create a lot of interesting dilemmas".

=== Early storylines ===
One of Rhys' first storylines saw him caught up in Karl and Susan Kennedy's marital problems. Rhys is the attending physician to Jim Dolan (Scott Parmeter), a man befriended by Susan. At first, Rhys is not aware that Karl and Susan are going through a difficult time in their marriage as he is "solely concerned" with Jim's well-being. Rhys is annoyed by Susan's interference with his patient and Barber told a columnist for Inside Soap "He wants him to have chemotherapy, but Karl tells Susan it will only prolong Jim's suffering, not save his life. Susan tells that to Jim, which Rhys doesn't like." Karl later takes over as Jim's physician and Rhys steps back and watches the situation unfold. Rhys is with Jim when he dies and a writer for the official Neighbours website said it is an event that will stay with him for a long time.

Rhys has a one-night stand with Kate Ramsay (Ashleigh Brewer) not long after his introduction. Rhys meets Kate in the local bar and they have a "big night out"; the following morning Kate wakes up in Rhys' apartment. Brewer told a writer for Inside Soap "You don't actually see the lead-up – one minute she meets Rhys in a bar, the next minute we see that they've already slept together!" Kate feels awkward about the situation, but it is made worse when she is unable to remember Rhys' name. When Kate and Rhys meet again, they have different attitudes to their one-night stand. Brewer said Rhys is "a bit of a player", so it is not a big deal to him. He does not have any expectations of Kate, but she is uncomfortable with it and tries to cover her tracks. In November 2011, Brewer said it would be interesting to revisit the relationship between Rhys and Kate. Barber also thought it would be interesting to see where the characters could go together. The actor added that "sparks fly" when Rhys is around Kate, as he knows how to "press her buttons".

=== Surgical program ===
Rhys becomes determined to join the hospital surgical program led by the head of surgery, Martin Chambers (John Wood). When Karl makes a potentially dangerous mistake on a prescription form, Rhys covers for him, but makes it clear he wants something in return. Knowing Karl plays golf with Martin, Rhys asks to join their game so he can try and impress the surgeon. Despite being warned that Martin does not like to talk shop during his golf games, Rhys reveals that he has been following his career and Martin is impressed. Barber explained to a writer for Inside Soap "And Karl has no choice but to agree that Rhys is a good doctor. It's a bit awkward, because Karl doesn't like the way Rhys operates — so to speak!" Martin grants Rhys an interview for a place on the surgical program; however he forgets everything he knows and makes a fool of himself due to being hungover. Rhys misses out on a place on the program and Barber told Daniel Kilkelly of Digital Spy that he is feeling "devastated and desperate." Barber described the position as the Holy Grail for Rhys and because of a stupid act, he has lost it.

Shortly after missing out on the program, Rhys finds himself performing surgery on Chris Pappas (James Mason). Rhys initially treats Chris at the hospital after he is attacked at work by an unknown assailant. Chris refuses to stay for any further medical treatment and later collapses with a punctured lung. Barber said that as soon as Rhys sees Chris's X-rays, he "goes beyond the call of duty" to find him. The actor explained "When he finds him on the floor, he knows exactly what's happened, but he isn't sure how long he's been unconscious for. For all he knows, Chris could be dead within the minute — so he goes straight into emergency mode." In a bid to save Chris's life, Rhys performs an emergency procedure to get him breathing again using a screwdriver and a piece of piping. Rhys should not be conducting any type of surgery as he is not a qualified surgeon, but he does not think of the consequences. All About Soap's Laura Morgan said Rhys' "quick thinking" pays off and Chris starts breathing again, but at the hospital Karl warns him he will be held accountable if Chris does not pull through.

Rhys tries unsuccessfully to get Robbie O'Brien (Shaun Goss) to quit the surgical program. He then turns his attention to Erin Salisbury (Elise Jansen) and plots to take her spot on the program instead. He pursues Erin romantically and tries to distract her away from her work, so she will be kicked off the program and he can take her place. Barber said the scheme sees Rhys at his manipulative best, he realises Erin is vulnerable and he strikes. Jansen told a writer for TV Week that Erin is a bit reluctant to accept when Rhys asks her out. She thinks that someone like Rhys would not normally be interested in her, but she is flattered by the attention. Jansen added Erin is unaware it is all an act. Kate realises what Rhys is doing and interferes with his plan. Barber explained that Kate's feelings about the matter means nothing to Rhys as his sole objective is to get into the program. He does not mind that Kate is appalled at Erin becoming a casualty of his scheme.

Rhys forces Erin to miss a class and Barber revealed that Rhys feels no guilt about what he has done. He quipped "His plan is falling into place perfectly. You'll see that Kate later tries to tell Erin what Rhys is up to. But the guy is a charmer and is able to make Erin believe that Kate is the one with the problem." Rhys manages to convince Erin that Kate is a jealous ex-girlfriend and that he does not want her place on the program. Rhys charms Erin "into his bed", but he is put out when she calls time on their relationship to focus on her studies. Rhys later learns Erin has turned up late for surgery and during dinner together, he spills wine on Erin's top. When she turns up at the hospital, she smells of alcohol. Rhys then implies to Karl that she has a drinking problem. Barber explained "Rhys just has to plant the seed of doubt, fake some concern for his colleague, and rumour and innuendo does the rest..." Erin quits the program, giving Rhys the chance to successfully apply for her place.

=== Vanessa Villante ===
When Vanessa Villante (Alin Sumarwata) moves into Ramsay Street, she immediately catches Rhys' eye. He later treats her when she is admitted to hospital with severe morning sickness. Rhys believes the father of her child, Lucas Fitzgerald (Scott Major), is not "pulling his weight" and he starts looking out for her. Rhys helps Vanessa lift some heavy boxes and she offers to show him how to bake a cake to say thank you. A columnist for All About Soap observed "While Vanessa sees it as mates having fun, it's clear Rhys has got it bad!" Rhys later returns to spend more time with Vanessa, which unnerves Lucas. Herbison commented that Rhys may have met his match in Vanessa, while Barber said her feistiness appeals to him. He stated "He finds her attractive, and she takes the mickey out of him - that's good for Rhys. He needs to be knocked off his pedestal! Vanessa also exposes a rare vulnerability in Rhys, so there's a risk he could get hurt and lash out in other ways."

The actor further explained that Rhys is not put off by the fact she is carrying another man's child, he is attracted to her because of her "fire and passion". Barber added "She also doesn't play games and she says what she thinks. Rhys loves that about Vanessa and sees her as someone he can trust, which is rare for him." Vanessa and Rhys eventually give into their attraction for one another and share a kiss in Harold's Store. Barber commented that his character enjoys making the first move, so he is the one who goes in for the kiss. The actor also thought it would be interesting to see his character in a relationship. TV Week's Andrew Mercado observed that Rhys should prepare for a bumpy road ahead, with Vanessa living under the same roof as Lucas. Rhys and Vanessa take their relationship to the next level in a consultation room at Erinsborough Hospital. However, they are shocked when Karl walks in on them.

When Rhys is offered the chance to apply for a three-month work placement in Japan, he decides to apply and then convince Vanessa to go with him. Barber revealed "He puts himself and his heart on the line like he's never done before. At first, Vanessa says no - and he's devastated. He's in a really vulnerable place and he doesn't take her knockback well. Rhys has been a bit of a ladies man all his life and he's never really committed to someone before Vanessa. She's a pretty special girl as far as Rhys is concerned." Rhys becomes determined not to give up and he is "thrilled" when Vanessa changes her mind. Barber teased that it is possible viewers could see the last of Rhys and Vanessa for a while, adding "There are definitely interesting times ahead!"

=== Departure ===
On 26 November 2012, Erin Miller from TV Week announced that Barber would be leaving Neighbours, along with two other cast members. Executive producer Richard Jasek stated "All the characters departing will leave a legacy on Ramsay Street which is testament to the extraordinary talents of the actors playing them. Communities are constantly changing and Neighbours is reflective of this." Miller believed Barber was keen to look for new projects elsewhere. The actor filmed his final scenes in December and it was later revealed that his character would be killed off. While attending Sonya Mitchell (Eve Morey) and Toadfish Rebecchi's (Ryan Moloney) wedding reception, Rhys becomes trapped inside a collapsed marquee, following a gas explosion. He appears to be unharmed and Barber explained "Rhys survives and comes to and manages to free himself from the wreckage. He seems relatively okay and unscathed." Rhys goes to the hospital as a precaution but, despite being told not to by Karl, discharges himself. Barber said that because Rhys is headstrong, he thinks he is fine, but then he collapses outside the hospital and dies. TV Week's Thomas Mitchell commented that Rhys's death is heartbreaking, especially as he was planning to reconcile with his father. Rhys made his last screen appearance on 20 March 2013.

== Storylines ==
Rhys meets with Jim Dolan for his first round of chemotherapy and assures him it is a simple procedure. He learns Karl and Susan Kennedy have been giving Jim advice about his treatment and he asks them to stop. A few days later, Jim informs Rhys that he wants to stop the chemotherapy. Rhys meets Kate Ramsay at the local bar and they have a one-night stand. During his rounds, Rhys checks on Jim and stays with him as he dies. Affected by Jim's death, Rhys goes to the gym looking for distraction and he befriends Kyle Canning (Chris Milligan). Rhys flirts with Jade Mitchell (Gemma Pranita), but she rebuffs his advances. Jade later asks for Rhys' help in getting her housemate, Michelle Tran (HaiHa Le), to move out. Nurse Danielle Paquette (Georgia Bolton) questions Karl and Rhys about a mistake on an unsigned prescription form and Rhys covers for Karl. He then asks Karl if he can join his golf game with Martin Chambers, the head of surgery. Kyle invites Rhys to move in with him and Jade and he accepts. Kyle defends Rhys when he flirts with Steve Barnes' (Nicholas Gunn) girlfriend, but he refuses to listen when Rhys tells him to walk away. Steve punches Kyle, who becomes angry with Rhys for leaving him. Rhys apologises and hires a cleaner for the house to make it up to Kyle.

In a bid to impress Martin and his colleagues, Rhys purchases a barbecue and invites them over for dinner. He is granted an interview with the surgical board to join their training program at the hospital. Following a night out with Dane Canning (Luke Pegler), Rhys gets a hangover and is horrified to learn his interview has been moved to an earlier time. Rhys struggles to answer the panel's questions and he is not invited to join the program. He later visits his mother, Elaine, at her hospice, where he tells her he has joined the program. Rhys treats Chris Pappas (James Mason) after he is attacked, but fails to get him to stay for his X-rays. Aidan Foster (Bobby Morley) spots that Chris has a broken rib, which is pressing on his lung and Rhys finds him collapsed on the floor of Fitzgerald Motors. Rhys performs an emergency decompression on his lung and saves his life. Rhys asks senior surgeon Jessica Girdwood (Glenda Linscott) to reconsider letting him join the surgical program, but she declines. Rhys tries unsuccessfully to get Robbie O'Brien to quit the program and he turns his attentions to Erin Salisbury. He pretends to be romantically interested in her and tries to distract her from her studies.

Kate tells Erin about Rhys' plan, but he convinces Erin that Kate is a jealous ex-girlfriend who is lying. Erin believes him and they have dinner together. Rhys pours wine on her shirt sleeve and at the hospital, he implies to Karl that Erin has a drinking problem. She quits the surgical program and Rhys asks Jessica if he can take her place. Karl realises he has been used and Rhys takes him to visit Elaine, to try to make him understand what getting on the program means to him. Elaine reveals she has spinal degeneration and Karl remarks that Rhys cannot help her. Rhys explains that he wants to help the next person to develop the condition. Rhys sits an exam on the material he has missed and Jessica allows him join the surgical program. Rhys makes a bet with Kate that he can seduce Jade, but when he goes to kiss her, Jade rejects him. Rhys' mother asks if she can visit him and Rhys tells her he is working over Easter. When they run into Jade and Kyle, Rhys does not introduce them to Elaine and she accuses him of being ashamed of her. Rhys then takes Elaine to meet Martin, who reveals he failed his surgical program interview. Elaine accuses him of lying to her and being like his father. Rhys denies this and Elaine tells him to fix things with the people he has hurt.

Rhys treats Susan when she has an MS relapse and he tries to make sure she is prepared in case her condition becomes worse. He later looks after Vanessa Villante (Alin Sumarwata) when she is brought in with severe morning sickness. Vanessa learns Rhys has been talking about her with his friends and she tells him to stay out of her business. Rhys later helps Vanessa carry some boxes and he spends the day baking a cake with her. He buys her a new mixer and Vanessa invites him to dinner. Rhys gives the cake to Elaine and when he tells her about Vanessa, she warns him to think about what he is doing before letting it go any further. Rhys thinks about cancelling on Vanessa, but he later arrives with dessert. Rhys asks Vanessa to bid on him at a charity bachelor auction, so he can raise more money than Karl. Vanessa wins and she chooses a couples massage for them to enjoy together. Rhys learns Susan has befriended Elaine and he angrily tells her to stay away from his mother. Vanessa witnesses the scene and becomes cold towards him. Rhys apologises to Susan and opens up to Vanessa about why he did it.

Rhys goes along to a cookery class that Vanessa is teaching and flirts with Tiffany Giles (Shaye Hopkins) to make Vanessa jealous. She invites him to dinner and he suffers an allergic reaction to the food. Vanessa and Rhys almost kiss, but are interrupted by Lucas. The following day, Rhys goes to Harold's Store and kisses Vanessa. Rhys opens up to her about his father and they arrange a date. When Troy Miller (Dieter Brummer) is brought into the hospital, he tells Rhys that Jade attacked him. Rhys reports this to the police and when Jade finds out, she asks him to leave the house. Rhys applies for a three-month study tour in Japan and asks Vanessa to come with him. Rhys' mother later gives him a ring so that he can propose to Vanessa. Shortly before leaving for Japan, Rhys comes across a car accident involving the street's teenagers. He rings the emergency services, before assessing their injuries. Rhys cuts his hand on a piece of wreckage, which forces him to cancel the trip to Japan. He later learns that he has only a five per cent chance of making a full recovery. Following an EMG, Rhys learns that there has been no improvement to his hand. After altering the report to say that his nerves are healing, Rhys is invited to assist Jessica in surgery.

Vanessa learns that Rhys altered his test results and he begs her to keep his secret. Jessica later asks Rhys to retake the EMG and informs him that his nerves will never improve to the standard required for a surgeon. Realising Vanessa spoke to Jessica, Rhys breaks up with her. When Rhys learns that Vanessa is marrying Lucas, he urges her not to go through with it. Rhys attends the wedding and Vanessa struggles with her vows and leaves the church. Rhys then visits Vanessa and she berates him for ignoring her, before telling him she does not want his love. Both Elaine and Kate encourage Rhys to fight for Vanessa and he tries apologising to her. When Vanessa goes into labour, Rhys takes her to the hospital and stays by her side while her son is born. He tells her that he has never stopped loving her and when he proposes, Vanessa accepts. However, when Rhys discovers that her son, Patrick (Lucas MacFarlane) has ebstein's anomaly, Vanessa calls off the engagement to focus her attention on him. Rhys sets up a fund raising webpage for Patrick and sells his car to kick start the donations. He decides not to tell Vanessa, but she learns from Lucas that it was him and she tries to return Rhys' money.

Rhys gives his mother her ring back and she realises that he still loves Vanessa. Rhys receives a letter from his father, Eddie (Ned Manning), but refuses to open it. Eddie calls the house, but Rhys is short with him. While Rhys is choosing whether to see his father or not, Elaine gives him all the letters he ever wrote to him and tells him to read them first. Rhys later decides to see his father. During Sonya and Toadie's wedding reception, a gas bottle explodes destroying the marquee. Rhys is initially trapped inside, but he manages to pull himself out. He suffers some minor injuries and broken ribs. Elaine comes to see him at the hospital and she tells him that she supports his decision to see his father. Rhys discharges himself, against Karl's wishes. He then collapses in the car park and dies from an undetected blood clot.

== Reception ==
For his portrayal of Rhys, Barber was included on the long list for the 2012 Most Popular New Talent Logie Award. Writers for TV Week branded Rhys a "handsome doc" and a "selfish surgeon-to-be." A writer for the Daily Record said Rhys was "deserving of a slap" for taking advantage of Karl's mistake with a prescription. The writer also called Rhys a "chancer." When Rhys tries to impress Martin, television critic Dianne Butler quipped "And I see John Wood's in the show. He's a golf-playing doctor [...] whose leg is being humped by Rhys Lawson tonight. Rhys puts on a barbecue to try to oil his way into a surgical-training program, only there's a rat under the plate when he lifts the lid to put on the snapper. Vintage Neighbours." Larissa Dubecki of The Sydney Morning Herald thought Rhys was "dastardly", while the Herald Sun's Cameron Adams called him "creepy" for cyber stalking Erin.

Adams later wrote "dodgy doctor" Rhys was threatening Paul Robinson's (Stefan Dennis) status as the Erinsborough bad boy. Laura Morgan of All About Soap said that Rhys sank "to an all-time low" when he tried to sabotage Erin's career and that he thoroughly deserved a slap from her. Morgan branded the character "ruthless Rhys" and stated that he was "a creep" and "a devious doc". A columnist for TV Choice also thought the character was ruthless and sneaky. They added that Rhys played dirty when he spread rumours about Erin having a drink problem. But thought they had seen a "twinge of conscience" in him after Erin quit.

In February 2012, Channel 5 ran a poll asking viewers "Who's Ramsay Street's biggest Mr Nasty?" out of Rhys and Paul Robinson. Rhys received 33.51% of the vote. A writer for the channel branded the characters the "show's two resident villains." The following month, Cameron Adams (Herald Sun) observed "And if Dr Evil-in-training Rhys isn't enough of a scumbag, he does the old "red shirt in a washing machine of white shirts" to create a pink fit among the owner." Jason Herbison of Inside Soap commented "Since taking up his position at Erinsborough Hospital last year, Rhys has proven to be both a career-driven doctor and a shameless womaniser!" A Daily Record soap opera columnist observed that Rhys had gone "ga-ga" for Vanessa. A Huddersfield Daily Examiner reporter decided that Rhys was just a "grumpy medic".
