= Jordan Patrick Smith =

Scottish-Australian actor (born 1989)

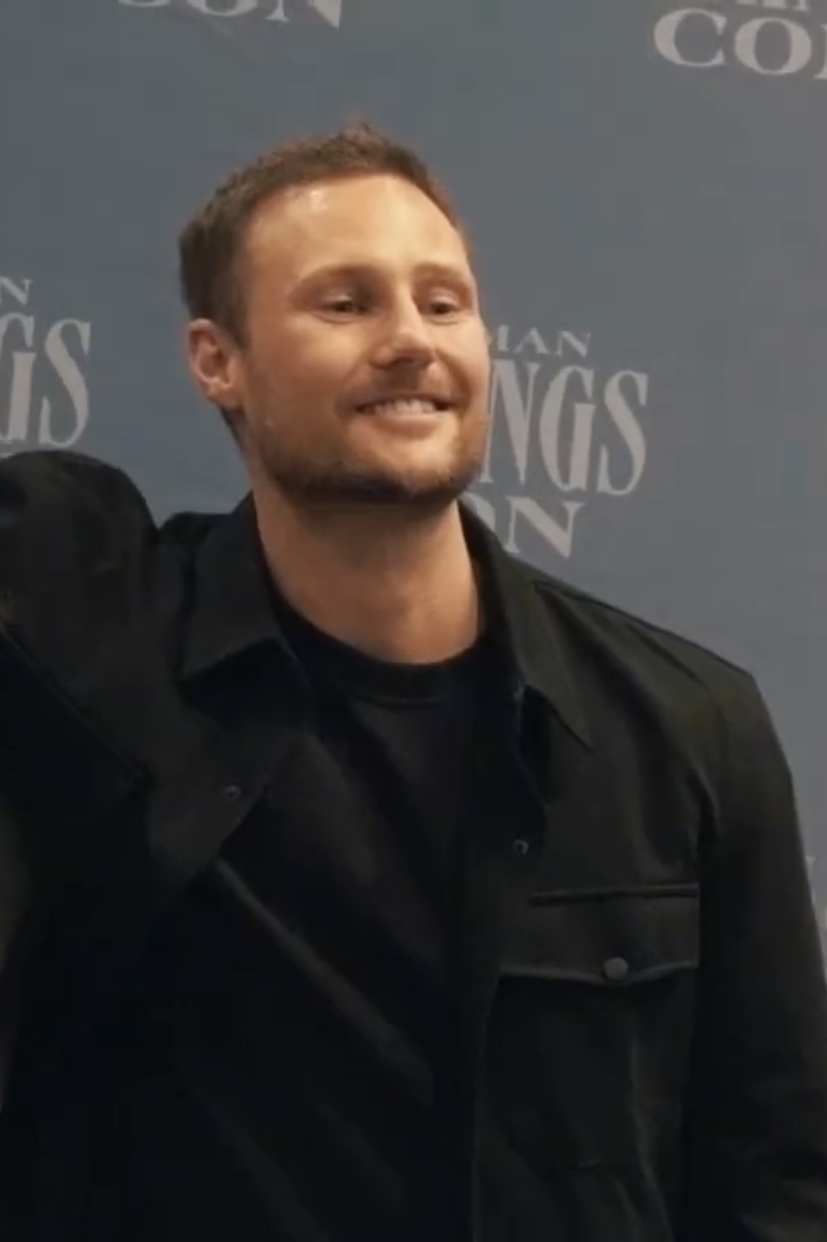
- Smith at the 2022 German Vikings Con
- Born: 18 June 1989 (age 37); Fife, Scotland
- Occupation: Actor
- Years active: 2006–present

Jordan Patrick Smith (born 18 June 1989) is a Scottish-Australian actor. He gained prominence through his role as Andrew Robinson in the soap opera Neighbours (2009–2013, 2022). He has since appeared in the film Unbroken (2014), and the historical dramas Banished (2015), Vikings (2016–2020), and the HBO horror fantasy drama Lovecraft Country (2020).

== Early life ==
Smith was born in Fife. He attended St Columba's High School and played football for Dunfermline's youth academy. Following a holiday to Australia in 2001, Smith's family fell in love with the country and decided to emigrate. They moved to Queensland in 2003. He attended Carmel Catholic College.

== Career ==
After finishing school, Smith took a number of acting courses and appeared in a few commercials. He has previously appeared in H_{2}O: Just Add Water, in which he played a surfer. Smith has also had roles in Mortified and Home and Away.

While between jobs, Smith worked as a labourer. In 2009, he was offered the role of Andrew Robinson in the Australian soap opera Neighbours, but nearly had to turn it down because he was in hospital. He says, "I'd been doing some work as a labourer and I'd been lifting up concrete floors when some of the concrete flew up and smashed into my face. My nose got all swollen and became infected, so I was kept on a drip of antibiotics for a week. I got the call to say I got the part while I was still in hospital on Sunday night (in Queensland) and I had to be in Melbourne by 7 am the next day."

Smith has admitted that Neighbours had to change his character's background story because of his Scottish accent. Andrew was initially meant to have been brought up in Brazil, but the strength of Smith's accent meant that this had to be changed. He has also stated that he had to "refine" his accent in order to be understood by other cast members and the audience. Smith admitted that if he was not playing the role of Andrew Robinson he would have liked to play the role of fellow Neighbours character Lucas Fitzgerald, played by his co-star Scott Major, instead. While he was appearing on Neighbours, Smith resided with his co-star Chris Milligan, who played Kyle Canning.

On 26 November 2012, it was announced that Smith would be leaving Neighbours. He made his final screen appearance as Andrew on 29 March 2013. Smith co-starred in Angelina Jolie's Unbroken as Cliff, an Australian prisoner who is taken to a Japanese POW camp in World War II. In 2015, Smith appeared in the BBC series Banished; he joined the cast of Vikings as Ubbe in 2016; and in 2020, he played William in the HBO series Lovecraft Country.

== Filmography ==
=== Film ===
Year	Title	Role	Notes
2008	The Ruins	Heinrich	
2014	Kerion	Sci	
2014	Unbroken	Cliff	

=== Television ===
Year	Title	Role	Notes
2006	Mortified	Bully #2	Episode: "The Talk"
2007–2010	H_{2}O: Just Add Water	Juicenet Customer; Passer-by; Surfer #2; Cameron	Guest roles
2008	Home and Away	Damo Nicholls	Guest role
2009–2013, 2022	Neighbours	Andrew Robinson	Main cast
2015	Banished	Private Mulrooney	Recurring role
2016–2020	Vikings	Ubbe	Main cast (seasons 4–6)
2020	Lovecraft Country	William	Recurring role
2026	Two Years Later	David	Recurring role
