= Ben Barber =

Australian actor

- Born: 25 August 1984 (age 41); Victoria, Australia
- Occupation: Actor
- Years active: 2009–present

Ben Barber (born 25 August 1984) is an Australian actor best known for playing Rhys Lawson in the Australian soap opera Neighbours.

== Early life ==
Barber grew up in Warrnambool, Victoria. He took part in amateur dramatics while he attended Brauer College. After graduating, he chose not to pursue acting and joined the army reserve. Upon leaving the army, Barber took a part-time acting course at the Victorian College of the Arts, before he was accepted into the National Institute of Dramatic Art.

== Career ==
Barber's first major television appearance was in the Australian soap opera Home and Away. He was later cast in another soap opera, Neighbours as a regular character, Rhys Lawson. In November 2012, it was announced that Barber would be leaving Neighbours in 2013. Barber made a guest appearance during the third season of Janet King in 2017.

== Filmography ==
Year	Title	Role	Notes
2009	Jimmy Tenison	Ryan Roberts	Short film
2009	One More Day	Tim Newton	Short film
2011–2013	Neighbours	Rhys Lawson	Regular role
2011	Home and Away	Mick	
2017	Janet King	Rhys Atkins	2 episodes
2017	Home and Away	Colin	2 episodes

=== Theatre work ===
Year	Title	Role	Notes
2008	East Is East	Abdul Khan	
2008	Death and the Maiden	Gerado Escobar	
