= Lassiter =

Lassiter is an English family name. It is a habitational name from the city of Leicester (see Lester). Notable people with the surname include:

- Ariel Lassiter (born 1994), Costa Rican professional footballer
- Amanda Lassiter (born 1979), American women's professional basketball player
- Art Lassiter (1928–1994), American soul singer
- Bob Lassiter (1945–2006), American radio personality, known as "Mad Dog"
- Charles T. Lassiter (1870-1930), American judge and politician
- Elisa Lassiter, American politician
- Francis R. Lassiter (1866–1909), American representative, lawyer and military officer
- Ike Lassiter (1940–2015), American football defensive lineman
- Jack Lassiter, the chancellor at the University of Arkansas at Monticello
- James Lassiter, American film producer
- Kwamie Lassiter (1969-2019), American football player and coach
- Kwamie Lassiter II (born 1998), American football player
- Luther Lassiter (1918–1988), American pool player
- Marcio Lassiter (born 1987), Filipino-American professional basketball player
- Rhiannon Lassiter (born 1977), British children's book author
- Roy Lassiter (born 1969), American soccer player
- Seneca Lassiter (born 1977), American middle-distance runner

== Fictional ==
- Carlton Lassiter, fictional character in the American dramedy Psych, played by Timothy Omundson
- Connor Lassiter, fictional protagonist in the novel Unwind
- Hector Lassiter, fictional character in series of historical literary thrillers by Craig McDonald
- Jack Lassiter (Neighbours), fictional character from the Australian soap opera Neighbours, played by Alan Hopgood
  - Lassiters Hotel, fictional location from the Australian soap opera Neighbours
- Jim Lassiter, fictional gunfighter and lead character in the novel Riders of the Purple Sage by Zane Grey, which has been adapted into five different film versions across the span of eight decades
- Major James Lassiter, fictional former Confederate army officer, main character in the film Rio Conchos (1964) based on the novel Guns of Rio Conchos (1958) by Clair Huffaker
- Owen Lassiter, fictional former President of the United States in the American TV drama The West Wing episode "The Stormy Present"
- Paul Lassiter, fictional character in the American sitcom Spin City, played by Richard Kind
- Lassiter, fictional character (fallen angel) in the Black Dagger Brotherhood series, by J.R. Ward
- Peter Lassiter, fictional character played by Josef Sommer in the 2000 film The Family Man
- Nick Lassiter, protagonist in the 1984 adventure film Lassiter (film), also known as The Magnificent Thief

== Others ==
- Dr. Wright L. Lassiter Jr. Early College High School, a high school in Dallas, Texas
- Lassiter Coast, the portion of the east coast of the Antarctic Peninsula that extends from Cape Mackintosh to Cape Adam

== See also ==
- Lassiter House (disambiguation)
- Lester
- Lasseter (disambiguation)
