= Who Pushed P.R.? =

Storyline from the Australian soap opera Neighbours

"Who Pushed P.R.?" is a storyline from the Australian television soap opera Neighbours, which began on 23 August 2010 with a special week of episodes. The week culminated in the soap's 6000th episode (broadcast on 27 August), where the character Paul Robinson (Stefan Dennis) is pushed from the Lassiter's Hotel mezzanine by an unseen assailant. The storyline aired as part of the show's 25th anniversary and Dennis's character was made the focus of the storyline as he was the only remaining member of the original cast. The storyline was initially going to see Paul being shot, but the show's G rating prevented the production team from going ahead with it. Events leading up to and following the attempted murder put several characters in the frame, in the style of a whodunit mystery.

Dennis was one of two cast members who knew the identity of the culprit; he was told minutes before he filmed the scene in which Paul was pushed. The rest of the cast found out a couple of weeks after the 6000th episode was broadcast. The person responsible for the attempted murder was revealed to be Rebecca Robinson (Jane Hall) during the episode broadcast on 27 September 2010. Hall revealed that she had known her character was responsible from the beginning. The "Who Pushed P.R.?" storyline was well received by critics and viewers. Despite low ratings for the 6000th episode in Australia, the storyline provided the show with a small ratings increase in the UK.

== Storyline creation and development ==
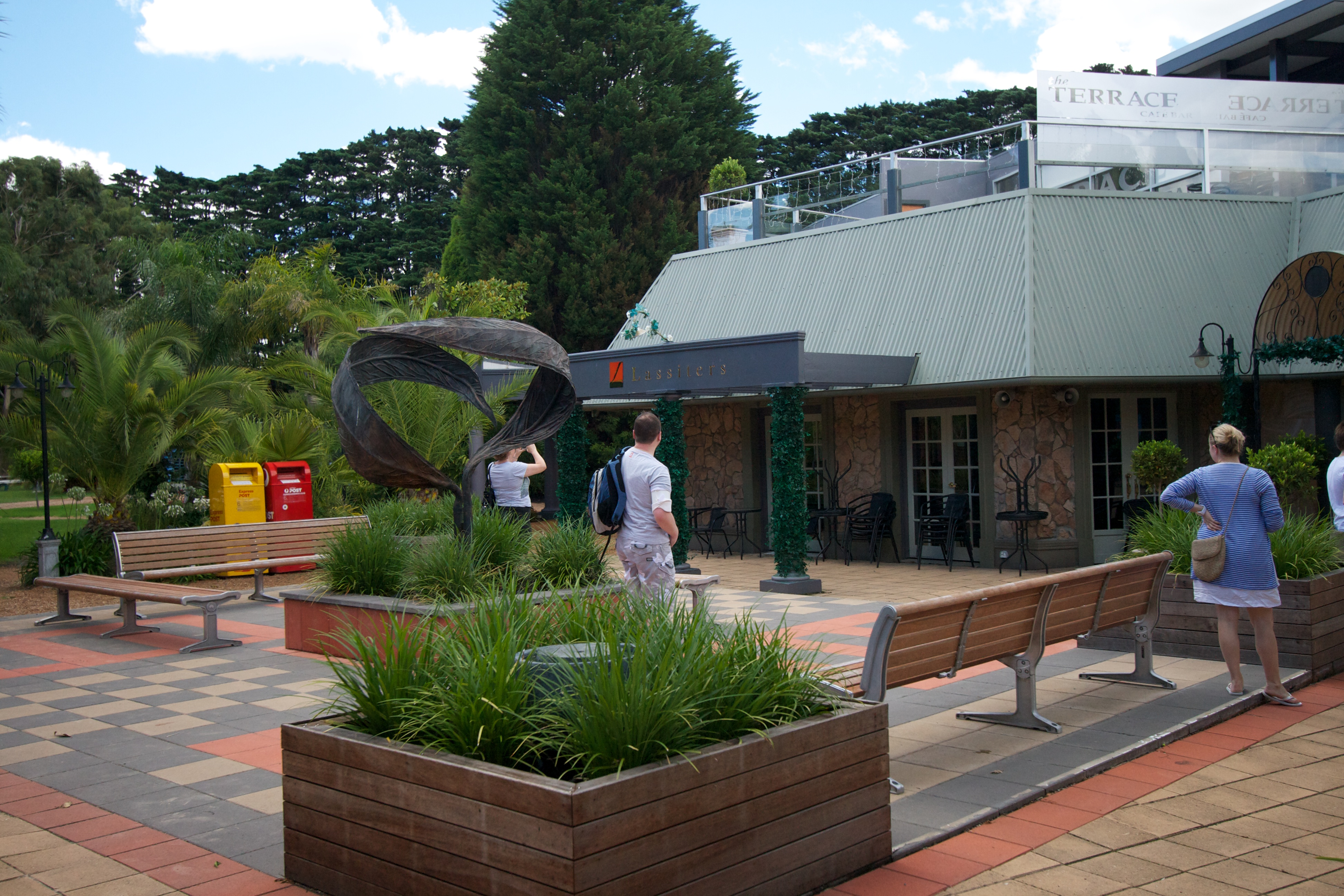
Paul was pushed from the Lassiter's Hotel mezzanine

The storyline was created during one of four planning meetings that are held during the year, in which the crew plot out all the big story arcs. Executive producer Susan Bower said that the team knew that block 1200, which featured the 6000th episode, had to be "incredibly important and sensational". They also wanted to pay homage to the first ever Neighbours episode, so the storyline had to include Stefan Dennis and his character. In a post for the official Neighbours website, Bower explained that making Paul Robinson the focus of the "big climax" to the 6000th episode was deliberate as he was the only remaining member of the original cast. The storyline was the highlight of the show's 25th anniversary celebrations and bosses were hoping it would boost falling ratings.

The crew had initially wanted to script a "Who Shot Paul Robinson?" storyline, but due to the show's G rating classification in Australia, they could not go through with it. They then settled on the "Who Pushed P.R.?" storyline instead. Bower stated that the storyline had to begin "very, very early", so it could develop and all the suspects that they chose to write into the story were set up. As the storyline was being written, the production team decided to add in Paul's worsening financial situation, which led to him embezzling money from Lassiter's, which then led to new character Diana Marshall (Jane Badler) arriving. Bower commented "it was putting all these pieces together" that really turned the storyline into a proper whodunit.

During the summer of 2010, the Neighbours sets underwent a makeover and a mezzanine level was added to Lassiter's Hotel. Bower and producer Neal Kingston revealed that this was to be the focal point of the "Who Pushed P.R.?" storyline. The cast and crew shot the scenes for the 6000th episode celebration week in early June. Described by Bower as "a monumental block", everyone had to work extra hard to get everything shot. An extra day was added to the filming schedule of both the location and studio shoots. Speaking to a Channel 5 reporter, Dennis said that it was hard to film the moment Paul fell from the mezzanine as there was no stunt involved. He commented that the scene was "very cleverly filmed" and if it was not for the lack of a falling body, viewers may have thought a stunt had been performed. The actor explained that the restrictive time-slot and G rating means Neighbours are not allowed to show a falling body. Dennis described the shoot as being "no different from another day of shooting on Neighbours."

Dennis was told the identity of the culprit minutes before he filmed the scene in which Paul was pushed. He was initially the only cast member who knew for "quite a while." The actor was sworn to secrecy and was not allowed to tell any of his co-stars. Dennis admitted that he was forced to lie that he did not know the identity of Paul's attacker when he was asked. He also said that he was not surprised when the culprit was revealed to him. When asked if he was surprised at who the culprit was, Dennis stated that he was not because it was explained to him why it was that person. The other cast members did not find out who the culprit was until a couple of weeks after the 6000th episode. Jane Hall later revealed that she had known her character, Rebecca, would be the culprit from the start. She was told by the writers it what was what they had planned. Hall admitted to thinking that the storyline would be "really tricky" as it goes against her character's nature.

Of filming the moment in which Rebecca pushes Paul, Hall said "The way Stefan Dennis (who plays Paul) and I interpreted it and acted it was we had to satisfy ourselves that it was one of those random and instantaneous mistakes people make. When we worked on the scene we had to make it look like she had a moment of fury that caused her to do that." Hall knew that viewers would be surprised at Rebecca being the culprit and she herself was surprised by the fan's reactions. Some women questioned how Rebecca could do such a thing to Paul, even though he cheated on her and lied to her. Hall thought that someone could get "so fed up" that they made a rash decision that is not something they thought they could ever do. In September 2010, Rebecca's confession and explanation for the night she pushed Paul was broadcast. The episode initially saw Declan Napier (Erin Mullally) admit to Kate Ramsay (Ashleigh Brewer) that he was responsible to protect his mother. Hall added that "the ramifications of Rebecca pushing Paul over the mezzanine are far-reaching".

== Suspects and motives ==
"Paul Robinson, or P.R as we like to call him, has been up to his usual tricks over the past few weeks and everyone on Ramsay Street is becoming really sick of him. What will they do about it?".

—Executive producer Susan Bower speaking about the storyline.

A reporter for BBC News explained that following the attempt on Paul's life, viewers would be left to guess the culprit from a number of suspects in a similar way to the popular Dallas storyline "Who shot J.R.?" There were officially six suspects for the attempted murder. The developments leading up to moment Paul is pushed were played out over five episodes, each focusing on one of the suspects. The episodes explored possible motives and the events involving Paul and the suspects. Dennis told an Inside Soap columnist that each episode would begin with Paul standing on the mezzanine, before it flash backs to the events preceding it. Viewers would then see why each suspect had a reason to harm him. Bower revealed that the viewers would know ahead of the characters who the actual culprit was. An MSN writer added "With so many enemies who had the motive to harm him, it will be very hard to guess 'Who pushed P.R?'"

Paul's youngest son, Andrew Robinson (Jordan Patrick Smith), wished his father dead after Paul threatened to disinherit him. Andrew was loyal to his father, but realised that Paul stood in his way of future success. Smith said "Andrew has tried to gain his dad's approval, but Paul refuses to see his good intentions, leaving Andrew to resort to desperate measures to get what he wants." Paul's wife, Rebecca, had discovered that he embezzled money from Lassiter's, had sex with Diana, threatened her son and exposed Stephanie Scully's (Carla Bonner) secret. Rebecca felt betrayed by all of this and Hall observed that "Rebecca's hurt turns to rage". Following Paul's fall, Rebecca arrived at the scene within a few seconds. Rebecca's son, Declan Napier, went against Paul and tried to take over Lassiter's. When Paul found out he threatened both Declan's mother and daughter, India (Alia and Gabriella DeVercelli). Declan told Rebecca that Paul cannot hurt her and get away with it shortly before Paul was pushed. Of the situation, Mullally commented "When Declan sees that Paul is the cause of his mother's traumatic state, in addition to his own professional failure, he's had enough."

Toadfish Rebecchi (Ryan Moloney) hated Paul after his sham marriage to Steph and her paternity cover-up were exposed. Paul had also insulted Toadie's partner, Sonya Mitchell (Eve Morey), and forced Toadie to do some illegal and immoral things in his capacity as a lawyer. Toadie was left wanting some payback. On why Toadie could be the culprit, a Holy Soap reporter wrote that he had "already proved himself a man of questionable morals". Lyn Scully (Janet Andrewartha) had not recovered from her heartbreak at being dumped by Paul hours after their wedding in 2006. Paul also destroyed her daughter, Steph's life by exposing her secret. Lyn was heard commenting that the world would be better off without Paul around. Diana Marshall became a suspect after Paul jilted her "in the boardroom and the bedroom". Paul also humiliated Diana when he sent her packing from Lassiter's. Of Diana's reason to kill Paul, Badler explained "Seeing her name splashed across the Erinsborough News prompts Diana to pull out all the stops in order to bring Paul down. And she still has friends in high places!" Diana was seen placing a call asking for something to be taken care of and handing money over to a stranger just before Paul was pushed.

Shortly after the attempt on Paul's life, Scott McGregor was introduced to the cast as Detective Brennan, who was placed in charge of the investigation. Brennan wasted no time in questioning the Ramsay Street residents, but he received conflicting information. Jackie Brygel from TV Week reported that Mark would have his work cut out for him as everyone was seemingly intent on pointing the finger at someone else. Everyone began jumping to conclusions as they had their own suspicions as to who committed the crime. McGregor explained that Kate Ramsay would give Rebecca a false alibi, while Lyn would get Diana into "strife" and Summer Hoyland (Jordy Lucas) lands Andrew in trouble, but he would not help himself either. Channel 5 ran a poll on their website asking viewers to predict who pushed Paul and over 10,000 votes were cast. The majority of the voters thought it was someone other than the six suspects. 20% thought Diana had pushed Paul, followed by 19% who correctly guessed it was Rebecca. Declan pulled in 16% of the vote, Andrew had 14%, while Lyn drew 6%, Sonya 5% and Toadie had 1%.

== Plot ==
Paul suffers some financial difficulties with his businesses – Lassiter's Hotel and PirateNet, a local radio station. To help ease his problems, he transfers $100,000 from the Lassiter's Corporation into the PirateNet accounts and tells his wife, Rebecca, that it is from an anonymous benefactor. Rebecca's son, Declan, believes Paul has been embezzling money from Lassiter's and contacts Diana Marshall about his suspicions. Diana is sent to Erinsborough to investigate Paul's dealings, on behalf of Rosemary Daniels (Joy Chambers), who owns a significant stake in Lassiter's. Paul hires Toadfish Rebecchi to be his lawyer and Toadie discovers Paul's embezzlement. Paul tries to cover up what he has done, but his son, Andrew, accidentally gives Diana proof of the crime. After learning that Diana knows everything, Paul asks her to join him in taking over the company. To prove to her that he is serious, Paul has sex with her, but Diana tells him that she is going to take his job. Paul hires a private investigator to bug Toadie's phone in the hope of finding something to blackmail him with. He learns that Toadie is helping Stephanie Scully to cover up the fact that she is pregnant by her best friend's husband. Paul then asks Toadie to make it look like Diana embezzled the money instead. Toadie later agrees to help Diana bring Paul down. Paul learns Toadie and Diana are working together, so to punish Toadie, he reveals his and Steph's secret over the radio.

Rebecca is disgusted with Paul and throws him out of their home. To win her back, Paul gives up working at Lassiter's for six months and places Declan in charge. Declan and Diana join forces to bring down Paul and Rosemary. However, Andrew helps Paul uncover their plan in time. Paul then informs Diana that she has been sacked and he threatens Declan, who tells Rebecca. Sonya Mitchell confronts Paul and he insults her. Andrew believes that Paul will give him Declan's job, but Paul refuses to. When he learns Andrew tried to access his will, Paul tells his son that he will have him removed from it. Andrew wishes his father dead. Diana contacts Jack Ward (Peter Lowrey) and asks him to "take care of Paul", before telling Rebecca about their affair. A devastated Rebecca heads to Lassiter's to see Paul and Declan follows her. Paul goes to the hotel's mezzanine and looks out across the complex, while thinking about recent events. An unseen person arrives at the hotel and goes up to the roof. Paul recognises the person and greets them, before he is pushed through the glass wall of the mezzanine. Karl Kennedy (Alan Fletcher) and Toadie attend to Paul, who has head injuries, broken ribs and a broken arm. Seconds later, Declan and Rebecca rush out of the hotel.

Detective Brennan visits the scene of the crime and finds one of Diana's earrings. He stops Diana at the airport and questions her. Diana reveals that Rebecca knew about Paul's affair and Brennan brings Rebecca to the station. Declan asks Kate to provide a false alibi for Rebecca and she agrees. Brennan then questions Declan and Summer Hoyland, who tells him about Andrew wishing Paul dead. Andrew is questioned and released. He then teams up with Summer and Natasha Williams (Valentina Novakovic) to investigate the crime. Andrew suspects Sonya when he learns that she has a criminal record for assault and no alibi. Sonya is questioned and released. The teens follow Diana, who meet with Jack. Natasha gets Jack's phone and Andrew gives it to Brennan, who then arrests Diana for conspiracy to commit murder. Soon after, Susan Kennedy (Jackie Woodburne) receives anonymous texts telling her that Diana did not push Paul. When Paul wakes from his coma, he remembers arguing with someone on the night he was pushed. He then mentions Diana's name. Shortly after, Diana receives a call informing her that the police are on their way to her hotel. Diana escapes and visits Paul, where she tells him she did not push him.

Paul gets Andrew to take him to Lassiter's, where he suddenly remembers who pushed him. Rebecca tries to get Paul to sign divorce papers and he tells her that he remembers who pushed him. Rebecca then tells Declan that she cannot leave Paul now, but Declan tells her that they have to leave. Kate discovers them packing and demands an explanation. Declan tells her that he pushed Paul after they fought on the mezzanine. However, Rebecca then admits that it was actually her who pushed Paul. She explains that she was angry and humiliated after learning about Paul's affair and his threats towards Declan. She went to Lassiter's to confront him and ended up pushing him. Rebecca admits to sending the texts to Susan and calling Diana. When Rebecca tells Paul that she is going to confess and then leave him, he blackmails her into staying with him. A few months later, Paul agrees to sign an affidavit in which he waives his rights to press charges against Rebecca, but only if she spends the night with him at Lassiter's. Rebecca agrees and when she has the affidavit, she ends the marriage. Rebecca tells Susan the truth and asks her to get Kate to change her statement, before she leaves the country.

== Promotion and broadcast ==
To promote the 6000th episode and the storyline, Network Ten's music show Video Hits aired a special called "Video Hits Presents: Neighbours 6000th Episode". The one-hour show included music clips performed by past and present cast members, along with artists who had performed cameos in the show. A party for the cast and crew was held at The Olsen Hotel in Melbourne on 29 July 2010 to celebrate the 25th anniversary and the 6000th episode. Videos of the cast discussing the plot for the 6000th episode celebration week were also uploaded to the official Neighbours website.

The storyline was featured on the front cover of the 21–27 August 2010 issue of TV Week. A souvenir mini magazine celebrating Neighbours' 25th anniversary was also included with the issue. In late August, Bower travelled to London to work with Channel 5 on their promotional campaign for the storyline. A preview of the storyline was later uploaded to the channel's official Neighbours website. The "Who Pushed P.R.?" storyline began airing from 27 August 2010, the serial's 6000th episode, in Australia. In the UK, the storyline began broadcasting from 15 October 2010.

== Reception ==
=== Ratings ===
Despite the storyline's attention and advertising, overnight figures showed that the attempt on Paul's life on 27 August 2010 was watched by 520,000 viewers, which was one of the show's worst ratings in weeks. The following episode, which was broadcast on 30 August and revealed that Paul was in a critical condition, attracted 704,000 viewers. An audience of 656,000 viewers watched Rebecca confess to pushing Paul on 27 September, which made Neighbours the 23rd most watched programme in Australia that day. In the UK, the "much-anticipated" 6,000th episode gave the soap "a modest boost" when it pulled in 1.37 million viewers during its 5:30pm showing on 15 October. The following episode posted a small increase of 1.43 million viewers, exceeding expectations. Rebecca's confession was watched by 1.69 million viewers, giving the show its best audience since 22 February 2010.

=== Critical response ===
The storyline received generally positive attention. Describing the storyline, David Knox said "series baddie Paul Robinson (Stefan Dennis) may have met his match in Diana (Jane Badler) when his Lassiters empire is about to be pulled from under him. But he has more than one enemy and Friday's mysterious episode that asks 'Who pushed P.R.?' is a soapie homage to Dallas' famous 'Who Shot J.R?'" Knox later called the storyline an "el-cheapo riff on 'Who Shot J.R?'". Television critic Andrew Mercado said "we had "Who Pushed PR" which wasn't quite "Who Shot JR" on Dallas circa 1981 but it's amazing they got as much suspense as they did in an elevator and then shoving short Paul Robinson off a balcony just one floor off the ground". Mercado later praised the plot saying "They did the 6000th episode really well" and that the key to Neighbours staying relevant was to focus less on suburban storylines and more on that type of drama.

Mary Papadakis from the Herald Sun called the plot "sinister" and commented "[it] goes to show there's never really a dull day on Neighbours". Her fellow Herald Sun critic Cameron Adams chose the 6000th episode as his "Top Choice" on television for the week. He commented "they've marked the occasion with Ramsay St villain Paul Robinson fighting for his life. Again. But who did it? His ingrate son Andrew, who wished him dead, Yank baddie Diana, who teamed with Paul's stepson Declan to bring him down, or his wife Rebecca, who is anti-Paul at the moment? Actually, who didn't do it?" A Channel 5 website writer deemed the plot "one of the show's most dramatic storylines to date". Shortly after the 6000th episode aired in Australia, a Holy Soap reporter revealed that fans of the show had taken to online forums to praise it and the whodunnit plot.

A reporter for The Guardian stated "As whodunits go it's not quite up there with who killed JR, or indeed anything to do with EastEnders' Dirty Den, but it's the mystery all Neighbours fans – yes all of them – are talking about." Peter Collins of the South Wales Echo said that he had been "glued to the television" every lunchtime for the countdown towards the 6000th episode. Collins added "Never mind who shot JR. The big question now is: who pushed PR? [..] It is a fascinating question which the programme writers are likely to string out for longer than the Chilean miners were down the mine." Matt Bayliss of the Daily Express admitted that he was not afraid to say "teatime telly has never looked so good". A Western Mail reporter stated that Neighbours had pulled out one of soap opera "momentous episodes that get everyone talking."

A Daily Record journalist proclaimed "Things have got a little Orient Express on Ramsay Street recently. After all, it's harder to find somebody without a motive to attack Paul Robinson than somebody with one, which is proving difficult." In November 2010, a TV Week critic placed the plot at number twenty-one on their "100 Most Memorable TV Events of 2010" list. They commented that Paul proved he had more lives than a cat after he was pushed of the balcony and that Rebecca being his attacker was "the greatest shock". In March 2012, MSN TV's Lorna Cooper included "Who Pushed P.R.?" in her list of the best and worst soap whodunits. Cooper gave the storyline seven out of ten and noted "In a reveal that was always very likely, it was Rebecca who nearly killed Paul. After finding out about her husband's many indiscretions, she took her revenge." In March 2015, a Herald Sun reporter included the storyline in their "Neighbours' 30 most memorable moments" feature.

Judy Johnson from Dollymix included the storyline in her feature on the top five soap mysteries in July 2012. She wrote "We couldn't possibly forget Aussie soap Neighbours in the whodunits hall of fame. [...] Shoved off the balcony at Lassiters, Paul was left fighting for his life with very little sympathy given his naughty ways; the series' villain had made quite a few enemies in the weeks leading up to the anniversary episode thanks to his various affairs and deceit." In April 2017, Daniel Kilkelly of Digital Spy included the storyline in his feature on the ten best soap whodunits. He commented, "There's no prizes for guessing where Neighbours took their inspiration from for this storyline, with even the plot's tagline cheekily referencing Dallas."
