= Lassiter House =

Lassiter House may refer to:

- Lassiter House (Autaugaville, Alabama), listed on the National Register of Historic Places (NRHP)
- Lassiter House (Macon, Georgia), listed on the NRHP in Bibb County, Georgia

== See also ==
- W.W. Lassiter Wholesale Grocery Warehouse, Vicksburg, Mississippi, listed on the NRHP in Warren County, Mississippi
- Lassiter (disambiguation)
