= Lasseter =

Lasseter may refer to:

== People ==
- Cindy Lasseter, birth name of Sister Cindy (born 1959), American campus preacher
- John Lasseter, filmmaker and executive at Pixar and Walt Disney Animation Studios
- Lewis Harold Bell Lasseter (1880–c. 1931), Australian gold prospector
- Vicki Lasseter (born 1960), American model for Playboy magazine

== Other ==
- Lasseter Highway in the Northern Territory of Australia
- Lasseter's Reef purported discovery by Harold Bell Lasseter
- Lasseter (musical), 1971 Australian musical by Reg Livermore, Patrick Flynn and Sandra McKenzie

== See also ==
- Lassiter (disambiguation)
- Lassetter, a surname
