= Lassetter =

Lassetter is a surname. Notable people with the surname include:

- Don Lassetter (born 1933), American baseball player
- Harry Lassetter (1860–1926), Australian military officer and businessman
- Jane Hansen Lassetter, American nurse and academic administrator

== See also ==
- Lasseter (disambiguation)
