= Paul Robinson (Neighbours) =

Fictional character from Neighbours

- Neighbours character
- Portrayed by: Stefan Dennis
- Duration: 1985–1993, 2004–2025
- First appearance: 18 March 1985
- Last appearance: 11 December 2025
- Created by: Reg Watson
- Introduced by: Reg Watson (1985); Alan Coleman (1993); Ric Pellizzeri (2004)
- Spin-off appearances: Neighbours vs Zombies (2014); Summer Stories (2016); Mrs Robinson (2017); Neighbours vs Time Travel (2017)
In-universe information
- Occupation: Engineering student; Air steward; Manager of The Daniels Corporation; Manager and owner of Lassiter's Hotel; Teacher; Newspaper editor and owner; Co-owner of The Waterhole; Mayor; Property developer; Motel owner; Co-owner of Lassiters Hotel
- Family: Robinson
- Father: Jim Robinson
- Mother: Anne Robinson
- Brothers: Scott Robinson
- Sisters: Lucy Robinson
- Half-brothers: Glen Donnelly
- Half-sisters: Julie Martin; Jill Ramsay
- Wife: Terry Inglis (1985–1986); Gail Lewis (1987–1989); Christina Alessi (1991–2005); Lyn Scully (2006–2009); Rebecca Napier (2009–2012) Terese Willis (2019–2023)
- Sons: David Tanaka; Leo Tanaka; Cameron Robinson; Robert Robinson; Andrew Robinson
- Daughters: Amy Williams; Elle Robinson
- Grandsons: Jimmy Williams
- Granddaughters: Harlow Robinson; Isla Tanaka-Brennan; Abigail Tanaka; Evelyn Robinson
- Grandfathers: Bill Daniels; James Robinson
- Grandmothers: Helen Daniels; Bess Robinson
- Aunts: Rosemary Daniels
- Nephews: Daniel Robinson; Harry Ramsay
- Nieces: Hannah Martin; Kate Ramsay; Sophie Ramsay; Madison Robinson; Annie Robinson-Pappas; Kiri Durant
- First cousins: Tracey Dawson
- Other relatives: Hilary Robinson; Matt Robinson; Gwen Simpson; Laura Dennison; Nikki Dennison

Paul Robinson is a fictional character from the Australian television soap opera Neighbours, a long-running serial drama about social life in the fictional Melbourne suburb of Erinsborough. He is played by Stefan Dennis. Paul was created by producer Reg Watson as one of Neighbours' original characters. He debuted in the first episode of the show broadcast on 18 March 1985 and appeared on a regular basis until 1992 when Dennis quit Neighbours to pursue work elsewhere. He reprised the role for a guest appearance in 1993. Dennis returned to the show in 2004 and has since remained in the role, making Paul the only original character to appear regularly from this point. Dennis viewed his decision to leave Neighbours as a mistake.

Early character development during 1980s episodes changed Paul into a powerful, arrogant and sometimes villainous businessman. Paul has an evil persona which has long been admired by Dennis for the entertainment value it creates. In 2007, Paul's evil ways were mellowed through a brain tumour story which brought the character in line with producer's vision of reinventing the show. The character has been used to play various stories ranging from money laundering, a leg amputation to being held hostage and incarceration for crimes. He is often portrayed concocting scams against fellow characters. As a prominent character, Neighbours writers designed their 6000th episode around Paul. The story was dubbed "Who Pushed P.R.?" and Paul was pushed from a mezzanine by an unseen assailant. The character's attack created a long-running whodunit mystery. Paul has had seven marriages and countless affairs, which has gained him notoriety as a womaniser. Paul's evil character and womanising have been well received by critics of the genre who were entertained. The actor has garnered various award nominations for his portrayal of Paul.

== Casting ==
In 1984, Stefan Dennis received a phone call from his agent who told him about an audition for a new soap called Neighbours. Dennis said "I wasn't that keen because I was more interested in a feature film I had auditioned for and felt sure I was going to get". Dennis originally auditioned for the roles of Shane Ramsay and Des Clarke (the roles were later given to Peter O'Brien and Paul Keane respectively), but was cast as Paul Robinson instead. Neighbours was cancelled by Seven Network seven months after its debut. However, it was revived by Network Ten and Dennis reprised his role as Paul from January 1986 onwards. He is the only current cast member who appeared in the first episode on 18 March 1985.

== Development ==
=== Characterisation ===
Paul as he appeared in the first episode of Neighbours

Paul was originally the quiet member of his family and had worked as an air steward. Paul's failed marriage to Terry Inglis (Maxine Klibingaitis) altered his personality and he became self-centred. Network Ten publicity assessed that it turned him "bitter and cynical". He worked to become a powerful businessman managing the Lassiters complex and developed many overpowering traits which left him viewed by others as a money-grabbing control freak. But the character was not left without kindness and shared his more generous moments with his grandmother Helen Daniels (Anne Haddy). He has been described as having the ability to notice talent in others, employing those who shared his ambition and nous.

Portrayed for most of his tenure as a deceiving villain, Paul can often be viewed participating in unpredictable stories. This arbitrary nature led Dennis to proclaim "he's a character you never get bored with. Even during times when storylines aren't centred on my character, the writers still come up with little twists for him all the time." Network Ten branded Paul a high flying business man who enjoyed womanising until he met Gail Lewis (Fiona Corke). Other labels the character has are "lothario" and "serial cheat" because of his ill-treatment of the opposite sex. Upon his 2004 return he was portrayed stuck in his old ways. The writer added Paul was committing dodgy deals and deceiving his neighbours in a bid for revenge. The character despises pity, has a damaged personality and can never be faithful to a romantic partner. Dennis branded Paul as "Mr. Evil" because of Paul's harsh treatment of women, observing that his character treated them like toys, throwing them away when he was bored.

When producers realised that Paul's behaviour had gone too far, they considered killing him off. Dennis commented "As an actor, I had the best time because this character just got more evil and more sneaky, more of a cad and a womaniser and it just escalated where it got to the point where it just got silly. It was ridiculous for the supposed reality of the show." The actor also said that he accepted the producers' decision to kill his character off when they explained that they did not know where to take him. However, the show's then executive producer Ric Pellizzeri decided to save the character and redeem him by giving him a brain tumour. Following the removal of the brain tumour, Paul mellowed in his evil ways. Of Paul's dramatic personality change, Dennis said: "He's changed back to where he was 18 odd years ago. What he has become is the same Paul he was back then when he was a very ambitious young entrepreneur with Lassiters and Robinson Corporation. But the difference now is that he is older and wiser and therefore a lot more shrewd and a lot more careful. Post brain tumor, he is no longer evil, more ruthless than evil. Ruthless with a conscience and emotion."

"You've seen Paul go through the ultimate evil stage just before he had his brain tumour a couple of years ago, where anything was possible. He was worth $150 million, he was a playboy and he had contacts in the underworld. Now he's back to being a more normal character."

— Dennis speaking of Paul's development. (2009)

Although Paul changed his ways to an extent, he still shows signs of being evil. Dennis has stated that he and fellow cast member, Alan Fletcher (Karl Kennedy) purposely portray hints of his former self. Of this Dennis stated: "I like to keep that boiling under the surface so that the audience will always think 'what is he up to next?'. You never quite know if he will burst out into Mr. Evil or stay as the character he is at the moment. Alan Fletcher keeps it alive as well, by always looking out the corner of his eye and thinking 'I just don't trust you!'" Dennis later defended his character to the Birmingham Post after he was branded an evil character, describing him in his early years: "Paul started out as a university student, which people have forgotten, he was studying engineering then, much to his father's disgust, left to join an airline and became a trolley dolly. He later became a bit of a cad but I wouldn't call him a villain. I'd describe him as a bad boy with a conscience". Dennis has also stated that he loves playing Paul as a "baddie", because in his opinion he is so colourful, not just an average bad guy, adding: "He's not just a black and white bad guy, he's a sneaky bastard. He's the smiling baddie".

In a 2022 The Sydney Morning Herald feature, Dennis branded Paul as "Australia’s longest-running TV villain." He wrote that playing Paul had been "one of the greatest privileges" of his life. He reflected that had someone told him in 1985 he would still be playing Paul in 2022, he would have "laughed maniacally". He added that Paul was "possibly the best loved and longest serving villain in Oz television history." He noted that Paul was once dubbed "The Junior JR" which he wore "as a bit of a badge". Dennis believed that playing a "dastardly character" like Paul would normally create real life challenges but "rather than booing, hissing and stone throwing", he was greeted with "legend" status. Dennis reminisced that Paul has many "nefarious deeds" to his history such as poisonings, arson, murder and various other crimes. He added that with his seven marriages, Paul "is the villain we all love to hate."

=== Relationships ===
Paul enjoyed a relationship with Terry, he believed he really loved her. She tried to defraud him and later kill him. These events had a knock on effect which plagued his relationship with Gail raising many trust issues. He has been described as "unlucky in love" during his early years in the serial.

During an interview with entertainment website Digital Spy Dennis discussed Paul's later relationships in depth. Paul's relationship with Lyn Scully (Janet Andrewartha) was short lived: he mistreated her but ultimately, in a twist for the character, he did the right thing. Dennis describes this as: "The Lyn story was quite sincere, but he had the good sense on the day of the wedding to tell her that he was no good. So he obviously cared about Lyn, but then she came back and haunted him." His relationship with Rebecca Napier (Jane Hall) at times can be fiery, of this Dennis said: "I want to see Paul and Rebecca be like Angie and Dirty Den. I think Rebecca is capable of that. She plays a fiery character and is a very strong. Paul needs somebody who is absolutely there for him and adores him, but will take no shit from him and stand up and fight as hard as she does."

Paul's relationship with his children is often non-conventional, however he has a close bond with his daughter Elle Robinson (Pippa Black), Dennis describes this, adding: "(She's 'a chip off the old block') and even though Elle annoys Paul sometimes, they are always there for each other. Paul adores his daughter and I think it works both ways."

=== Relationship with Christina Alessi ===
Writers created Paul's next relationship with Christina Alessi (Gayle Blakeney). In December 1990, a writer from TV Week revealed that writers were planning numerous issues for Paul's relationship, which would begin in episodes broadcast in early 1991. They stated their romance would be "tested severely" and "jealousy rears its head" when Christina accepts a blind date with another man. They created problems with their marriage via a pregnancy storyline. Paul carefully plans all aspects of Christina's pregnancy and even test themselves travelling to the maternity hospital. When Christina goes into labour, Paul runs out of petrol en route to the hospital. He is faced with the prospect of helping Christina to give birth at the roadside. Paul manages to secure a lift to the hospital in an ice cream van. Christina gives birth to a boy, Andrew Robinson and Shannon Holmes was selected to play him. The debacle embarrasses Paul, who is usually in control. Blakeney told Donna Hay from What's on TV that "the baby's safe and sound - unlike Paul's image."

Writers decided to focus on Paul's struggles following Andrew's birth. He finds it difficult to adjust to fatherhood and the stress of running his failing business becomes too much. Paul abandons Christina and Andrew, and disappears from Erinsborough. Paul admits himself into a psychiatric care facility to improve his mental health. He then travels to New Zealand where he meets up with his daughter, Amy Williams (Sheridan Compagnino). Paul decides to return to Christina and brings Amy with him. Christina is not impressed with Paul's behaviour and does not get along with Amy. She also proved to herself that she could cope with being a single mother in Paul's absence. Lisa Anthony from BIG! magazine observed Christina and Amy as being "at each other's throats" with Paul caught in the middle of their feud. Paul and Amy also have arguments because she reveals that she does not want to live with Paul. One altercation leaves Amy in hospital after she runs in front of Paul's reversing car and is knocked down. Dennis believed that Amy's arrival was another threat to Paul and Christina's marriage. He told a TVTimes reporter that "Paul can't seem to put a foot right. He cracked up when his business got into hot water. Now he's putting his marriage in danger."

Paul later kisses Christina's twin sister Caroline Alessi (Gillian Blakeney). The kiss occurs when Christina forces Paul to sleep on the sofa. When Caroline checks on him during the night, he mistakes her for Christina and kisses her. Caroline responds and they embrace each other. Dennis predicted that Christina would "go off the rails" if she knew about the kiss. He added that Christina would be "deeply hurt that her husband and her sister had betrayed her." Gillian told Twomey that Caroline is "frightened by her strong feelings for Paul" and she feels "terrible" about them betraying her sister. She similarly told a TVTimes journalist that Caroline is "really drawn to Paul" but also "terribly close" to Christina. This leaves her with a dilemma. Gillian added that Caroline thinks Paul and Christina's marriage could end regardless of her involvement. Caroline has to decide if she is missing an opportunity with Paul. Christina becomes suspicious when Caroline is unable to cope with her guilt and leaves Erinsborough for Italy. Discussing the story's effect on Paul's credibility, Dennis told Chris Twomey from What's on TV that Paul would "look stupid" if his third marriage failed. Dennis also defended Paul's actions because he believed the character's unfaithful actions mislead viewers. He added "Paul's not known for his compassion, he's just a stubborn, chauvinistic man. But underneath all that he has a big heart."

After months of causing drama for his family, Paul decides to change his behaviour to save his marriage. Paul thinks that renewing their wedding vows could help his family remain together. Paul is delighted that Christina forgives him and he begins to plan a secret wedding vow renewal. Dennis told a reporter from TVTimes that "Paul's a desperate man, he knows he's nearly blown it with Christina and he realises just how much he was in danger of losing. Now that things have settled down and now that he and Chrissie have ironed out their differences, he wants to give their marriage a fresh start." Dennis added it was a chance for the couple to "go back to the beginning". Paul enlists the help of Gaby Willis (Rachel Blakely) who pretends to need Christina to model a dress design for one of her clients. She also convinces Christina to wear make-up and lures her to the ceremony. The duo renew their vows in front of family and friends in Ramsay Street. Dennis revealed that the renewal was "one of the most moving" scenes he ever did with Blakeney. Dennis concluded that the restaged marriage "certainly brings Paul and Chrissie closer and seals the bond for their future years together."

While portraying Paul and Christina's romance, Dennis and Blakeney began a relationship together. They lived together, later separated but remained friends. Blakeney believed their break-up did not effect the story, stating that "we're both actors, so we didn't have trouble separating the script from real life."

=== Departure and reintroduction ===
In 1992, Dennis quit the role because he no longer felt challenged as an actor. He stated: "I was literally walking through it, I thought 'this is not good for acting, this doesn't keep me fresh at all, time to move on'." Dennis has said that one of his favourite moments was being asked to come back and celebrate Neighbours'' 2000th episode.

Following an eleven-year hiatus producers asked Dennis to return to Neighbours for the 20th anniversary episodes. However, their talks resulted in Dennis agreeing to return full-time. Alan Dale who played his on-screen father, Jim Robinson helped Dennis to make the decision to return. Dennis has since admitted that he made a mistake quitting Neighbours in 1992. He explained "I was stupid. I thought I was going to go to Hollywood and conquer the world, and I didn't." Dennis' return has made Paul the only original character still appearing on Neighbours. The actor continued to publicise his commitment to staying on the show long-term.

The character was reintroduced during the 2004 series finale. The episode focused on a fire at the Lassiter's complex which destroyed the local pub, hotel, doctor's surgery and coffee shop. Paul's arrival coincided with the fire which made him a suspect. His return forms the end of season cliff-hanger and Australian viewers had to wait months before Paul's return continued on-screen. Dennis told Jason Herbison from Inside Soap that "judging from his first appearance he certainly does look guilty." He teased that Paul is "very enigmatic" and his motives for committing the crime remain unclear. Dennis professed his love for his character's mysterious agenda but noted that Paul had "grown and matured" during his absence. Producer Peter Dodds believed that Paul's return gave his writers numerous stories. He detailed that it allowed the return of other past characters and "kick-started a whole new web of deceit and lies" within the show. He concluded that it has made Neighbours more dramatic ever since. Dennis later revealed that producers Ric Pellizzeri and Dodds almost fired him in 2006. In an interview with Studio 10, Dennis recalled the producers telling him, "We don't know how to do this. We have to fire you for you doing your job so well. It doesn't matter what we've thrown at you as Paul Robinson, you've done it. You've just got your teeth into it and done it. It's our fault. We've actually turned the character into a caricature of what he is and he's just sort of getting a little bit for this, what is supposed to be, a real show about real life."

=== Izzy Hoyland ===
The character was paired with fellow resident Izzy Hoyland (Natalie Bassingthwaighte) who shared a deceptive personality with him. This created many stories for both characters as they plotted against their neighbours. Dennis stated "the Paul and Izzy relationship was fantastic, it was very popular. Izzy was an interesting character because she was very emotional and insecure. That's what drove her evil ways. She had a bit of a soulmate in Paul." Dennis believed that the pair could not have worked long-term because they would have destroyed each other.

Izzy was in a relationship with Karl when writers began working on material for the new duo. Karl had been played as the arch-enemy of Paul, as they previously feuded. Izzy faces a problems in her relationship and turns to Paul for romance. Karl spends time away from Izzy leaving her free to conduct her affair. He returns to fight for his partner but nearly catches Izzy in bed with Paul. He leaves an expensive watch behind which Karl finds. Izzy pretends that she has purchased it for Karl and he lauds the accessory over Paul. Fletcher told Herbison (Inside Soap) that Karl is jealous of Paul and relishes the opportunity to show off his gift and boast about Izzy. He was keen for his character to discover Izzy's infidelity so Karl and Paul could have a confrontation. Izzy goes into business with Paul and Karl tries to warn her that Paul is untrustworthy. He is unsuspecting and does not believe Izzy would be attracted to Paul. The story provides insight to Izzy who needs stability from Karl and excitement which Paul provides her.

=== Leg amputation ===
One of Paul's main storylines culminated in him having his leg amputated after an accident. The storyline has received some criticism as Paul was shown on different occasions not limping with his false leg. Dennis explained during an interview how the production team helped ensure to make his limp appear more effectively, stating "They made me a splint which actually makes me sort of limp, but keeps my foot rigid so it looks like I actually do have a non-moving piece. One time I did change my leg, as in I swapped it over and limped on the other one to see if anyone noticed." Dennis revealed in May 2011, that he wears a brace on his leg as remembering which leg to limp on was becoming a "little distracting."

=== Robert's revenge campaign ===
Paul had been uninvolved in the upbringing of seven of his children, three of whom were born out of wedlock and hence did not know existed at the time of their births. This provided producers with scope to introduce estranged family members. In 2006, writers devised a long-running storyline in-which Paul's son Robert (Adam Hunter) plans a revenge campaign against his father. Robert's motives for his vendetta stem from Paul not being around while he grew up. Paul was happy that he had triplet children Elle, Robert and Cameron Robinson (also played by Hunter) back in his life. He tries to make amends with Robert and attempts to bond with him unaware that he is being plotted against. Writers decided to mark the show's 5000th episode with the story and Robert takes Paul hostage down a mineshaft. Dennis filmed the scenes in a filthy studio set surrounded by cameras, lighting and crew. He told Herbison (Inside Soap) that he found it difficult to pretend he was trapped underground.

Dennis explained that his character is oblivious to Robert's intentions and believes Robert is taking him on a family camping holiday. When Robert has Paul alone he drugs him and take him to the mineshaft. Robert admits to causing the plane crash which killed the Bishop family, intending Paul, Elle and Izzy to die. Dennis explained that Robert "really goes to town telling Paul what a terrible father he's been and how he's going to pay for it now." Robert gloats about his successful scheming and seals the entrance to the mine leaving Paul for dead. But Katya Kinski (Dichen Lachman) begins to suspect that Robert is mentally ill and it is up to her to convince other residents and save Paul from death. Paul escapes but Katya is next to be kidnapped by Robert because he is infatuated with her. She decides to humour Robert in the hope he will return her to Erinsborough. But Robert discovers that Paul plans to marry his mother Gail. He is unaware that it is a ruse set-up by authorities to arrest him. Katya convinces Robert that they should not leave together because he has a final chance to kill Paul at the wedding.

The sham wedding was originally suggested by Izzy in jest and she is shocked that Paul and Gail organise the nuptials. Dennis explained that Robert's "ultimate goal is to destroy Paul". By giving him a time and place to target Paul they plan to trap him. The pair exchange wedding vows which are not binding. But Robert does not surface which angers Paul. He begins to shout and orders Robert to show up and confront him. Robert is entised by Paul's goading and he approaches his father. Dennis said that the pair have a "massive showdown" and the psychotic character pulls a gun and shoots Paul. Following his latest crimes Robert surrenders and is arrested. The fake wedding provided Paul writers with the chance to explore Paul and Gail's relationship which had served their characters during 1980s episodes of Neighbours. Dennis said that the chemistry that existed in 1987 was still present between the pair. On-screen his relationship with Izzy begins to suffer but the wedding makes Paul remember his past shared with Gail. The actor recalled filming the wedding made him question whether Paul and Gail were still in love. In the episode various character's notice their feelings which angers Izzy. The story ends in tragedy and loss for Paul. Katya accepts a lift from Cameron and their neighbour Max Hoyland (Stephen Lovatt) spots Katya in the car. Max mistakes Cameron for Robert and believes Katya is in danger. In an attempt to rescue her Max knocks Cameron over and kills him. Lachman warned that it was the start of a new story in which Paul wants revenge on Max and issues him with a "chilling threat".

=== Who Pushed P.R.? ===
In July 2010, it was revealed that Paul would be central to the serial's 6000th episode. Executive producer Susan Bower had hinted previously that the milestone would involve Paul and Alan Fletcher teased audiences with the revelation that something horrible would happen to an iconic character. Of Paul's involvement and the reasoning behind it Bower explained: "As Stefan Dennis – Paul Robinson – was in the first episode 25 years ago, it was decided that his character play a most important role in this very special event [...] Paul Robinson, or P.R as we like to call him, has been up to his usual tricks over the past few weeks and everyone on Ramsay Street is becoming really sick of him. What will they do about it?" It was then announced the plot would be a whodunnit style arc, in which Paul is left fighting for his life after being pushed from the mezzanine level of Lassiter's Hotel.

The episodes were structured with a five episode build up prior to the 6000th episode, a new suspect being revealed in each. UK broadcaster Channel 5 posted an official statement: "With so many enemies, it will be hard to narrow down who had the motive to harm him. Who pushed P.R?". Jane Badler who plays Diana Marshall in the serial compared the storyline to that of the Who shot J.R.? storyline from American soap opera Dallas. On-screen the storyline progresses as new character Mark Brennan (Scott McGregor), tries to solve the mystery.

=== Cancer misdiagnosis ===
In 2015, producers decided to explore a false cancer storyline for Paul. The storyline sees Dr Nick Petrides (Damien Fotiou) pretend Paul has cancer in order to help him open up his own cancer treatment centre. The storyline was first teased by the serial's executive producer, Jason Herbison, during the show's 30th anniversary. He told Digital Spy, "We have a huge storyline for Paul coming out of the 30th week in Australia, involving Dr Nick Petrides. This will play out over a period of time and will see Paul at his most vulnerable." Herbison teased that Paul would make "big, irreversible decisions which will have a big bearing on his future." Fotiou had also initially said of his character before the storyline's unravelling, "His intentions are certainly noble, however all is not what it appears, and I love the way the story unfolds - there's a lot of surprises." Dennis branded it a "massive storyline" that continues for a "significant amount of time". Dennis revealed that director and former cast member Scott Major was "gobsmacked" upon seeing the false diagnosis. Dennis called the plot a "big, big journey" for Paul that will enable viewers to "a very, very different side of Paul". He added that Paul will take fans"on a rollercoaster. We will see a dark and very vulnerable side of him."

During a blood drive, Paul donates his blood and Nick alters the results of his blood test to indicate signs of leukaemia cancer after he is "initially furious" at Paul's discontinued support of his cancer centre. Paul is then delivered some "devastating news" from Nick, who tells him he has cancer. The storyline was used as a plot device for producers to reintroduce Paul's daughter, Amy (now Zoe Cramond), as Paul tries to contact her to inform her that he is dying. The storyline also coincided with Dennis' decision to shave his head for the Australian Childhood Foundation, which was "weaved seamlessly" into the plot as Paul decides to shave his head during his chemotherapy. Dennis said of having short hair, "This is freakishly short for me and I now can’t complain about having a bad hair day now. Now that I have the look, my ambition is for Paul to take on Walt in Breaking Bad." A Tenplay journalist also reported that the writers were initially panicked by Dennis' shortened hair, but the costume department had been "spending up big on hats" for Paul. Nick is eventually caught out after "the truth slowly begins to unravel" and he is sent to prison.

=== Return (2023-2025) ===
In 2022, it was announced that Channel 5 had cancelled the production of Neighbours, though subsequently, Amazon announced that they had picked up the series for their Freevee streaming service, and Amazon started filming the revived series in April 2023. Dennis admitted that filming the scenes of 2022 were "incredibly emotional" for him. He told Studio 10 on 10 June, that it was a "melancholy day" and got "incredibly emotional" filming his then final scene. Dennis was immediately announced to be returning as a series regular, along with Alan Fletcher, Jackie Woodburne and Ryan Moloney. In February 2025, the series was cancelled again, with production concluding in July and episodes ceasing to air in December.

== Storylines ==
=== 1985–1993 ===
Paul is the eldest child of Jim Robinson and his wife Anne. His half sister Julie (Vikki Blanche; Julie Mullins) was born the year afterward followed by brother Scott (Darius Perkins; Jason Donovan), half brother Glen (Richard Huggett) and finally his youngest sister Lucy (Kylie Flinker; Sasha Close; Melissa Bell). Anne died giving birth to Lucy, when Paul was only twelve and Paul's grandmother, Helen moved into the Robinson house to help Jim with the children. Paul was her self-confessed favourite.

Paul marries Terry Inglis after a whirlwind relationship. However, in episode 168, Terry shoots Paul when he finds out she killed her ex-boyfriend and she goes on the run. Terry is eventually arrested and later commits suicide in prison. This ultimately sows the seeds for the storyline in which Helen is kidnapped (episodes 402–406).

In episode 200, at the start of 1986, Paul agrees to Head up the Erinsborough branch of the Daniel's Corporation. This is after Rosemary Daniels talks him into it (at Helen’s suggestion), appealing to his sense of power and masculinity to persuade him. This episode marks the beginning of Paul's transformation from the early character into the strong, powerful, ruthless businessman he becomes.

Paul meets Gail Lewis for the second time, having worked with her previously, when she applies for a job at the Daniels Corporation. They both agree to enter into a marriage of convenience in order to secure a business agreement, but soon develop genuine feelings for each other and they renew their vows. That same year Paul learns that he has fathered a child, Amy (Nicolette Minster), with Nina Williams (Leigh Morgan).

Gail becomes convinced that Paul will lose interest in IVF treatment or adoption, but Paul becomes more committed to having children with her. After IVF treatment, Gail becomes pregnant with triplets, however, Paul starts working hard and becomes detached from Gail. After the death of her father Rob Lewis (Ernie Bourne), Gail decides to leave him and move to Tasmania where she gives birth to Elle, Robert and Cameron. The couple later divorce. Paul faces financial troubles when Hilary Robinson (Anne Scott-Pendlebury) withdraws her funding of the Daniels Corporation.

Paul leases his house to twin sisters Christina and Caroline. Christina falls in love with Paul and after a short romance and a quick engagement, the couple marry. Shortly after, Christina becomes pregnant and gives birth to a son, Andrew. Paul suffers a nervous breakdown and cheats on Christina with Caroline. The couple eventually reunite and they leave to manage a branch of Lassiter's in Hawaii. The following year, Paul returns to the street for Helen's birthday, where he frames his brother-in-law, Philip Martin (Ian Rawlings), for fraud. Paul then flees to Brazil and asks Christina to join him, leaving behind a signed confession.

=== 2004–2025 ===
Paul Robinson returns to Erinsborough and reignites chaos, beginning with setting fire to Lassiter’s and killing Gus Cleary. He manipulates various residents, frames David Bishop for fraud, and becomes entangled in corrupt development deals, which ultimately cost him his leg after a brutal beating. Despite his misdeeds, he rebuilds the Lassiter’s complex and rekindles his relationship with his daughter Elle.

A plane crash, caused by Paul’s son Robert, marks the start of further turmoil. Disguised as his twin Cameron, Robert drugs Paul and traps him in a mineshaft before being lured out by Paul and Gail during a staged wedding. Paul survives Robert’s attack but spirals into scheming, infidelity, and blackmail. His marriage to Lyn Scully fails due to his unfaithfulness, and Elle seizes his Lassiter’s shares, leaving him broke. After a brain tumor surgery causes temporary amnesia, Paul seeks redemption and begins a relationship with Rebecca Napier.

Paul’s criminal past resurfaces when he confesses to Gus’s murder, triggering blackmail attempts by Laura Davidson and Nick Thompson. He rekindles his wealth by reclaiming Lassiter’s and dating Rebecca, though his affair with Kirsten Gannon ends the relationship. He marries Rebecca after a failed wedding interrupted by Lyn’s revelation that she and Paul were still legally married. However, Rebecca later pushes Paul from the Lassiter’s mezzanine when his manipulations threaten her family. He survives, blackmails her into staying, but she eventually flees Erinsborough.

Paul faces financial and political challenges, including a failed mayoral campaign and conflicts with Terese Willis. He engages in affairs, notably with Priya Kapoor, and attempts underhanded business tactics, such as bribery and corporate sabotage. He suffers personal loss when Kate Ramsay, his niece, is fatally shot. Overcome with grief, Paul bonds with nephew Daniel and supports various family members, but his scheming never fully ceases.

Following bouts of depression, Paul reconnects with old flames, including Dakota Davies, and manipulates relationships around him, including trying to sabotage Daniel and Amber’s wedding. Diagnosed with leukemia (later revealed to be falsified by Nick Petrides), Paul briefly believes he is dying and mends bridges with family while selling Lassiter’s to the Quill Group, only to later regain it.

Amy, Paul’s estranged daughter, arrives with her son Jimmy, leading to turbulent family dynamics. His engagement to Naomi collapses after infidelity, and he targets Jimmy’s father Liam. Paul faces mounting debt, losing Lassiter’s temporarily to the Quill Group before buying into a rundown motel with Steph Scully. A deadly boiler explosion at Lassiter’s kills Josh Willis and Doug Willis, and Paul is wrongfully convicted. His innocence is later proven, but relationships with Terese and others remain strained.

Paul’s personal life grows complicated with new revelations, including discovering he fathered twins David and Leo Tanaka. He attempts to pursue Terese, who initially rejects him for Gary Canning. Business rivalries, manipulative schemes, and tensions with his children define this period. Eventually, Paul and Terese marry, though their relationship endures countless ups and downs, exacerbated by Paul’s meddling in family and business matters.

In later years, Paul’s machinations against Nicolette Stone over a surrogacy agreement lead to a million-dollar scandal when he mistakenly delivers Leo’s baby, Abigail, to David and Aaron. This deceit ends his marriage with Terese, who separates from him and begins a relationship with his half-brother Glen. Paul eventually considers selling Lassiter's to Shane and moving to New York with his family, but he aborts these plans upon his reconciliation with Therese. Their relationship collapses a year later after Paul covers up the apparent death of Krista Sinclair (Majella Davis), and he resists her half-sister Reece Sinclair (Mischa Barton) when she arrives at Lassiter's (ostensibly to oversee her family's recent acquisition of the hotel) to find her. Paul develops a new feud with Krista when she is found alive and appointed to a managerial role at the hotel, which peaks after the death of his son David, which Paul indirectly causes by tipping off Krista's vengeful ex-boyfriend Eden Shaw (Costa D'Angelo).

Grieving and disowned by his family, Paul falls into depression and a toxic relationship with Chelsea Murphy (Viva Bianca), who exploits him for status and money. After Chelsea’s betrayal and Krista’s miscarriage, Paul redeems himself by saving Krista, regaining Leo’s forgiveness, and reconciling with Terese, with the two moving into Paul's penthouse at Lassiter's and announcing their relationship on Christmas Day. Their relationship suffers when Chelsea returns with her newborn baby Thomas Murphy, whom she claims is Paul. Paul bonds with Thomas and Chelsea and the couple eventually share a kiss when Thomas falls ill. Chelsea leaves Erinsborough when it emerges that Paul is not Thomas' father, but chooses to keep his and Chelsea's kiss a secret from Terese. Paul leads Lassiter's in an attempt to win the Bronze Bell, but it soon emerges he is only doing this to cover up his embezzlement of company funds. When this is exposed, Paul is forced to step away from Lassiter's, deciding instead to buy the V Bar with Elle. Paul's kiss with Chelsea is eventually exposed, but he and Terese reconcile at a commitment ceremony.

Paul secretly begins planning a new project with Jimmy; Robinson Towers, two state-of-the-art tower blocks in the city, with one serving as a hotel and the other as a residential venue. Paul is devastated when it is revealed that Ramsay Street is to be demolished to build a new freeway but attempts to convince his neighbours to join him in moving to Robinson Towers. He is forced to compete with Shane's alternative project, the suburban Ramsay Hills, and hijacks Shane's promotional event for the suburb by syphoning off several of the attendees to attend an alternative event for Robinson Towers. Though the residents concede that both plans seem promising, Paul and Karl Kennedy (Alan Fletcher) are convinced by Karl's wife Susan (Jackie Woodburne) that Ramsay Street can still be saved, with the serial's final scenes implying that Paul will work with the Kennedys to save the street.

== Reception ==
"Not since the days of JR Ewing in Dallas has a soap businessman been as ruthless as Neighbours' Paul Robinson. His plan to convince the residents of Ramsay Street that it will soon be underwater is inspired – and his instant impulse to dig for dirt when Harold Bishop brought in an expert for a second opinion was pure class. Blackmail, intrigue and a complete lack of humanity – now that's a soap villain!"

— Lucy Lather from Inside Soap on Paul. (2005)

Dennis has earned various award nominations for his role as Paul. At the 2007 Inside Soap Awards, Dennis was nominated for Best Actor and Best Bad Boy. The following year, Dennis was again nominated for Best Actor and Best Bad Boy. At the first Digital Spy Soap Awards ceremony in 2008, Dennis was nominated for Villain of the Year. 2009 saw Dennis nominated for Best Actor and Best Bad Boy at the Inside Soap Awards once again. In 2010, Dennis was nominated for the very first Best Daytime Star award. He received a nomination in the same category in 2015 and 2017. He progressed to the viewer-voted shortlist in 2017, but lost out to Lorna Laidlaw, who portrays Mrs Tembe on Doctors. Dennis was nominated for Best Soap Actor (Male) at the 2018 Digital Spy Reader Awards; he came in joint ninth place with 3.9% of the total votes. In 2020 and 2022, Dennis won Best Daytime Star at the Inside Soap Awards. He won the award for the final time in 2025. That year, Dennis also received a nomination in the "Soaps - Best Actor" category the Digital Spy Reader Awards.

Paul was placed at number one on the Huffpost's "35 greatest Neighbours characters of all time" feature. Journalist Adam Beresford branded him as "the lothario of Lassiters", one of soap opera's most married men and "the scoundrel that Neighbours viewers absolutely love to hate." He is also labelled "ruthless" and the way he "tramples" on other characters, Beresford gushed that Paul "does it with such relish that you can't help but enjoy his schemes, no matter how extreme." Beresford initially thought Paul to be a "pretty quiet, decent young man" until Terry set him off on "the road to villainy". He concluded that "Paul has done it all over the years" and the show was unimaginable without him. In 2022, Kate Randall from Heat included Paul in the magazine's top ten Neighbours characters of all time feature. Randall stated "from ep one, we've loved to hate the Lassiters ladies' man. Married six times, ruthless Paul burned down his business, laundered money, became a fugitive, and only started being nice briefly because of a brain tumour." Paul was placed second in a poll ran via soap fansite "Back To The Bay", which asked readers to determine the top ten most popular Neighbours characters. The Daily Mirror's Susan Knox added that Paul is a "legendary character". In a feature profiling the "top 12 iconic Neighbours characters", critic Sheena McGinley of the Irish Independent placed Paulk third on her list. She stated that "every soap needs a loveable rogue" like Paul and compared him to the Coronation Street character Mike Baldwin (Johnny Briggs). That year, Paul was also featured on a list of "favourite Neighbours characters of all time", which was compiled by Lorna White from Yours magazine. In 1993, Donna Hay from What's on TV included Paul in a "marriages made in hell" feature. She assessed that Paul "has had it tough. His first wife Terry tried to shoot him, then his second wife Gail disappeared to Tasmania and gave birth to triplets. Unlucky in love, or what?"

A reporter from Virgin Media branded the character a "retro soap hunk." They branded him a "bad boy" who is "motivated by greed and lust, Paul manipulated his way into business and into the ladies' beds (even with a dodgy earring). Watch out ladies..." Virgin Media also ran a feature profiling their twenty-five most memorable television comebacks, amongst them was Paul's 2004 return and they said "ruthless 'workaholic' businessman Paul Robinson fled Australia in 1993 to escape fraud charges only to return more sinister than ever in 2005 to burn down the Lassiter's hotel complex." Holy Soap have said that Paul starting the Lassiter's fire and killing Gus during his 2004 return, was one of soap opera's greatest comebacks. They also branded him a "legendary figure" of Neighbours. In 2015, a Herald Sun reporter included Paul starting the Lassiters fire and later being pushed from a balcony in their "Neighbours' 30 most memorable moments" feature. Josephine Monroe in her book Neighbours: The first 10 years, names Paul one of soap opera's most enduring characters.

In 2010, to celebrate Neighbours' 25th anniversary, British satellite broadcasting company, Sky UK, profiled twenty-five characters of which they believed were the most memorable in the series history. Paul is in the list and joke about his many wives stating: "How many of Paul's five wives can you name? No points for current wife Rebecca, ten for naming Lynn, Gail, or Christina Alessi, and 1,400 points for remembering first wife, plumber Terry [...] Yes, Paul's been around the block." They also branded him as the reason Neighbours, in their opinion was good viewing in the 2000s adding: "It's his cackling soap villain role that we love to hate him for: his return in 2004, torching Lassiter's and befriending Dylan, marked the start of Neighbours getting awesome in the mid-noughties. Although it's probably safe to say that period was over by the time he suffered amnesia of everything after 1989." He has also been branded as a "legend character". Andrew Mercado, author of Super Aussie Soaps, describes Paul as being very similar to fictional character J. R. Ewing. In 2016, Victoria Wilson of What's On TV called Paul "one of soaps all-time biggest baddies!" and compiled a list of the top ten "scandals" he had been involved in. In her praise of the show and its writing, Dianne Butler of the Herald Sun called Paul "the best villain on television". She said he "remains undiluted by sentiment" and that he is "the one who needs his own series."

Entertainment reporting website Last Broadcast praised Paul's development, stating: "As the kind of shady character who'd do anything to make a fast buck, he even planned to bulldoze Ramsay Street to make way for a new supermarket development. And that's not all: fraud, blackmail, murder; there is no level to which Paul wouldn't have sunk. Yet, the infamous bad boy of Erinsborough, has, thankfully, turned over a new leaf." In her 2007 book, It's Not My Fault They Print Them, Catherine Deveny slates Paul and Dennis' acting ability stating: "Stefan Dennis as the mustache-twirling panto villain Paul Robinson, is a genius. I just wanted to yell out 'He's behind you, he's behind you!' It takes sheer brilliance to be able to act that badly". Similarly, Paul Kalina of The Age said Dennis as Paul lightens things up and he prances about like "a pantomime villain minus the moustache and cape." But Kalina believed "Erinsborough just would not be the same without him." The character receives a mention in Emily Barr's fictitious novel Out of My Depth, in which character Amanda is watching Neighbours, with scenes featuring Paul and Gail receiving disapproval from Harold, Amanda opines that she believes the couple are in love.

The character's reputation with women and his various romances and marriages have often drawn commentary from critics. Ruth Deller of entertainment website Lowculture commented on Paul stating: "He's always been a bit of a ladies' man and has had an eye for a business deal and has always struggled with whether to be good Paul or bad Paul. Ramsay Street's most prolific marry-er and father-er." She also criticises the fact Paul's false leg is never shown on-screen adding: "Paul has a wooden leg, which sometimes causes him to limp, when he remembers about it." An Inside Soap writer opined that "slimy seducer" Paul remained the same "eighties smooth operator", observing "he's certainly not short of a slick chat-up line or two. He's as skilled a lothario now as he always was." A TVTimes columnist stated "He's no Brad Pitt and he's a devious beggar at the best of times, but Paul Robinson doesn't half get the ladies." After Paul's affair with Priya was revealed, Cameron Adams of the Herald Sun stated "you have to admire Paul Robinson, who doesn't let a gammy leg and being hated by nearly everyone stop him having another affair." A reporter for the Evening Gazette observed, "When you've had a fling with just about every woman in Erinsborough, like Paul Robinson, it was inevitable that old flames would pop up at some point."
