= Jack Lassiter =

Chancellor at the University of Arkansas at Monticello

Harold "Jack" Lassiter Jr is chancellor of the University of Arkansas at Monticello. Before his current position, he was executive vice president of the University of Arkansas System, chancellor of the University of Arkansas Community College at Batesville, and the dean of Wharton County Community College.

== Retirement ==
Lassiter retired on December 31, 2014.
