= Erinsborough =

Fictional location from the Australian soap opera Neighbours

- Neighbours location
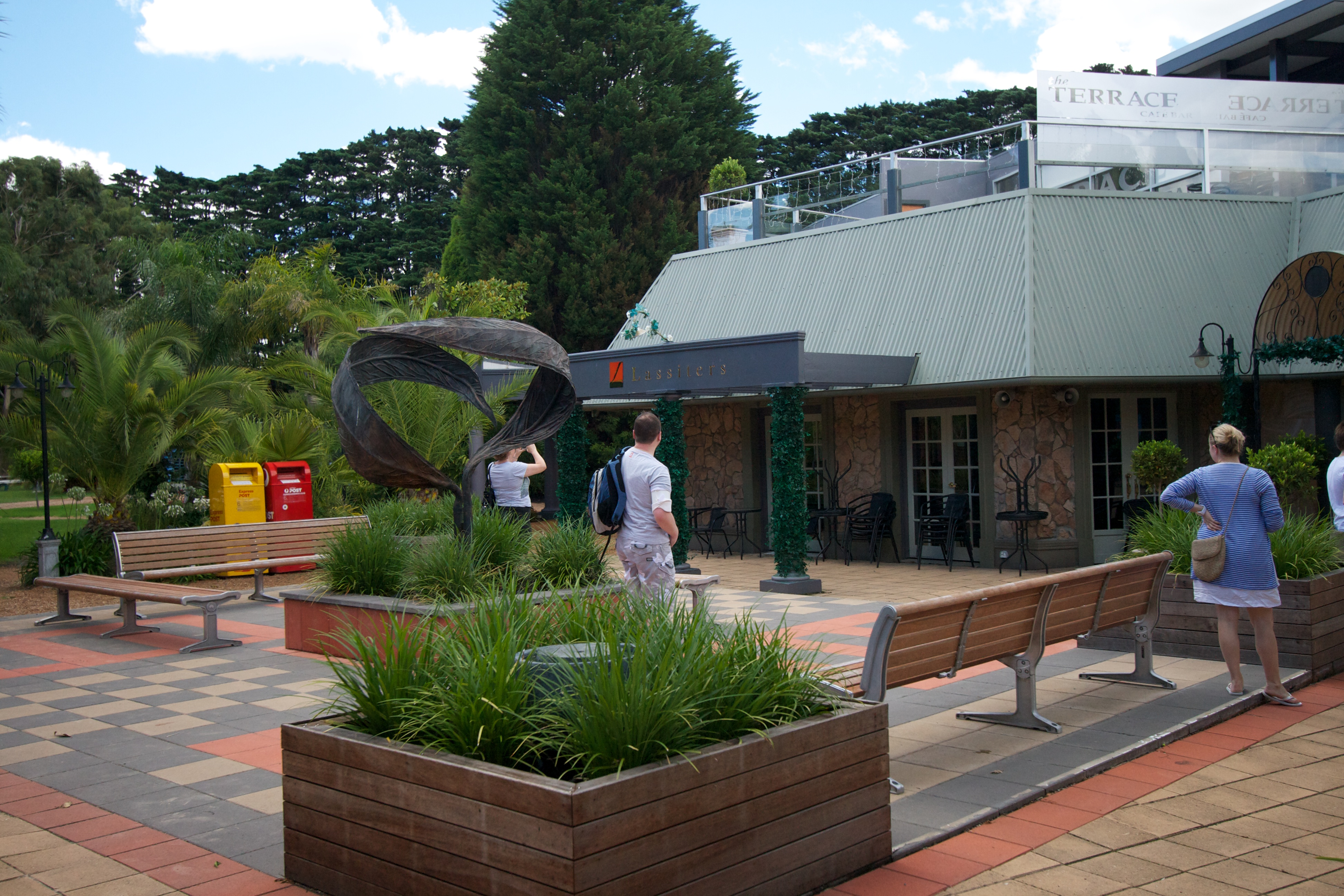
- The Lassiters complex exterior set, as it appeared in 2011
- Created by: Reg Watson
- Genre: Soap opera

In-universe information
- Type: Suburb
- Locations: Erinsborough High School; Lassiters Hotel; Ramsay Street
- Characters: Neighbours characters

Erinsborough is a fictional suburb of Melbourne, Australia, where the soap opera Neighbours is set, focusing on the domestic and professional lives of the people who live and work there. Neighbours centres primarily on the residents of Ramsay Street and other Erinsborough locations, most prominently those situated within the Lassiters complex. Erinsborough is a loose anagram of Neighbours.

== Erinsborough High School ==
Erinsborough High School, a fictional high school, has been featured onscreen since Neighbours began in 1985. It is a co-educational high school, and in its fictional history, it was opened shortly after the Second World War. Many of the characters have been seen attending or working there over the years. The Blackburn English Language Centre in Burwood East, Victoria, and Coburg High School have both been used for location and exterior shots. Kenneth Muir (Roger Boyce) was principal of the school when the series began and Erinsborough High was regularly seen until 1986, when Scott Robinson (Jason Donovan), Charlene Mitchell (Kylie Minogue), Mike Young (Guy Pearce) and Jane Harris (Annie Jones) graduated. The school was not seen again onscreen until late 1988.

The set features a corridor, a stairwell, an office, and a classroom. Other areas of the school, including the playground and changing rooms, have been featured over the years. In 2010, the layout of the classroom was changed as was the school logo. Neighbours' oldest surviving prop is the school's emblem and motto, which is stuck on the doors leading from the car park to the studios. "Erinsborough High School: Sapienter Si Sincere" means wisdom and success. Onscreen, Erinsborough High has faced the threat of closure four times, in 1991, 1997, 2015 and 2023 and the school has been merged with both West Waratah Tech and West Waratah High.

Erinsborough High's uniform has also been through numerous changes, with the maroon jumper being the most consistent item. A storyline that aired in October 2015 saw a fire destroy part of the school and trap several characters inside.

A spin-off series based in the school setting titled Neighbours: Erinsborough High was released digitally in November 2019. The spin-off was summarised as focusing on "bullying, mental illness, sexuality, cultural diversity, parental and peer pressure, and teacher-student relationships."

In May 2011, Erinsborough High came fourth out of four in a poll run by Inside Soap to find reader's favourite fictional school, which they would most like to attend. Erinsborough High received 16% of the vote.

In the 2023 revamped series, Jane Harris is the principal of Erinsborough High. Former principal Susan Kennedy has retired, while Ramsay street residents Nell Rebecchi, JJ and Dex Varga-Murphy, are students at the school. Wendy Rodwell (Candice Leask) is later hired as a teacher at the school.

Offscreen the interior school sets are shared with the sets of Erinsborough Hospital.

=== Eirini Rising ===
Eirini Rising is a retirement complex situated within the High School site, established in 2024 by Terese Willis (Rebekah Elmaloglou). Terese initially plans to build the complex on Power Road, but after the council reject her plans she seeks to take advantage of the planned closure of the school. Eirini Rising ultimately shares the High School site, allowing multiple characters to be brought together and "favourite characters from yesteryear" to return. Harold Bishop (Ian Smith) is one of the first residents at Eirini Rising, facilitating his return to the series. Hilary Robinson (Anne Scott-Pendlebury) also buys an apartment in the complex. Terese hires Karl Kennedy (Alan Fletcher) as resident doctor and wellness expert, followed by his wife Susan (Jackie Woodburne) as Operations Manager. Later in 2024, Terese is forced to resign from the project after her alcoholism relapse places the residents in danger, leaving Susan and Karl in charge. However, she is later reinstalled. Darcy Tyler (Mark Raffety) briefly works as a doctor before being arrested following the murder of resident Amanda Harris (Briony Behets). Other Eirini residents include Gino Esposito (Shane McNamara), Vera Punt (Sally-Anne Upton), Moira Tohu (Robyn Arthur), and Monte Jones (Dennis Coard). Eirini comes into financial difficulties and Terese is forced to go into partnership with a larger company in order to remain in operation. Part of the deal includes bringing on Colton Keys (Jakob Ambrose) as an assistant manager. The Eirini Rising resident characters were retired shortly before the series ended, with the setting making its last major appearance on 5 November 2025.

== Erinsborough Hospital ==
Erinsborough Hospital is the local accident and emergency hospital. It has seen many of the show's characters pass through its doors over the years. They have been treated for a variety of illnesses including smoke inhalation, burns, heart attacks and kidney disease. Many of the characters have been born or died at the hospital, while a number of regular and recurring characters have worked at the hospital over the years.

Over the years various Melbourne hospitals have been used for filming, including Austin Hospital, Dandenong Hospital, Maroondah Hospital and Peter MacCallum Cancer Centre. The exterior of the hospital is the entrance to the Neighbours production office in Nunawading. It has also doubled as a law firm reception and a funeral home. Alan Fletcher, who plays Doctor Karl Kennedy, said it was confusing for visitors and couriers when the studio reception was used for filming hospital scenes. In 2010, the hospital underwent a revamp, and a new look reception area was added.

== Lassiters complex ==
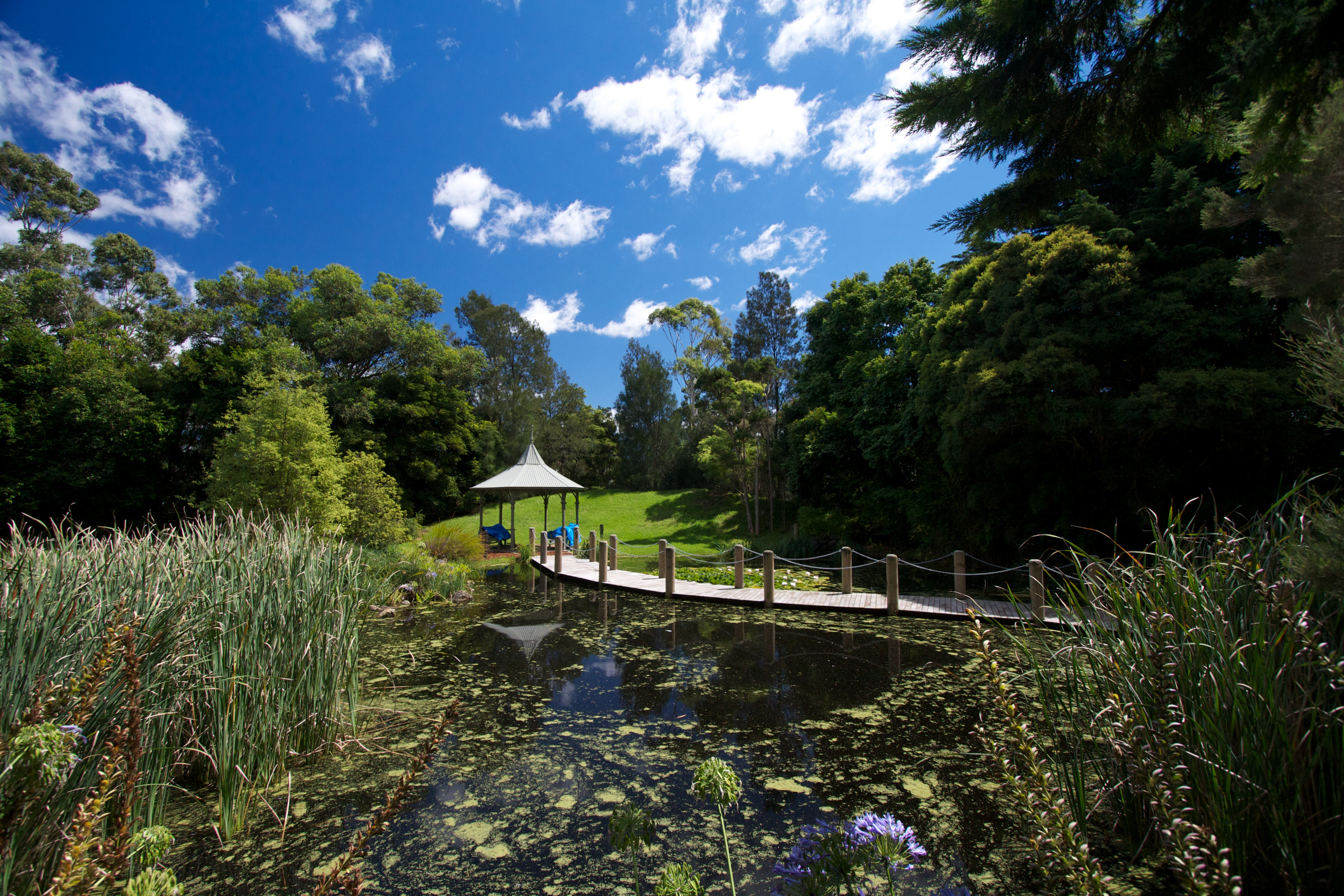
Lassiters Lake. The walkway was constructed in 2010, during a revamp of the sets

The Lassiters complex appears from 1986, encompassing many of the local amenities, including a hotel, bar, law firm, courtyard, and the Lassiters Lake. The sets from Holiday Island (1981–82) were redesigned and turned into the Lassiters complex and the swimming pool was turned into a lake. Daphne Clarke's coffee shop relocated to the complex, and when characters visited the café they started to get to know the rest of the complex. Rosemary Daniels (Joy Chambers) thought the complex would make a good base for the Daniels Corporation and she moved the company into an office there. A hotel, pub and lake also appeared in the complex. This meant that there were enough different locations for characters to come into contact with each other. There are also enough jobs within the complex to ensure that characters would make each other's acquaintance.

At the end of the 2004 season, Lassiters was burnt down by returning character Paul Robinson (Stefan Dennis). Paul also murders villain, Gus Cleary (Ben Barrack) in the pub. When the stunt team set fire to the set, many of the trees surrounding the area also caught alight. The Herald Sun placed the Lassiters fire at number five on their list of Neighbours top ten moments. Of the storyline, the paper said "Lassiters, the iconic hub of cafes, pubs and other businesses was for years where everyone met in Erinsborough, including the very famous pub run by Lou Carpenter. But at the end of 2004 producers wanted a massive cliff hanger, so they decided that the whole place would burn down. It was the part of the last major revamp for the soap." Sarah Megginson of SheKnows also added the fire to her list of most memorable Neighbours moments. David Walliams referenced the fire in his 2008 book, The Boy in the Dress. In early 2010, bulldozers moved into the Lassiters complex lot to the begin work on revamping the sets ahead of the show's 25th anniversary in March 2010. The lake was drained and a new walkway was constructed. There were also some new additions, including a new Erinsborough News office.

=== Harold's Café ===
Harold's Café (previously Daphne's, The Hungry Bite, The Holy Roll, The Coffee Shop, The General Store and Harold's Store) is a café and shop. It previously offered dry cleaning and postal services. During 2004, the café was burned down in a fire that also destroyed other businesses in the Lassiters Complex. When it was rebuilt, a Post Office was included. The production staff worked with the Australia Post to create the store, which was an official registered Post Office. During The Erinsborough Tornado storyline in 2014, Lou Carpenter (Tom Oliver) was trapped in Harold's Store with Susan Kennedy (Jackie Woodburne), who had to perform an emergency tracheotomy on him when he began choking on some food. In 2015, the store was renovated and renamed Harold's Café. The Rebecchi family took over running the café upon their introduction in 2017. Shiv Palekar was cast upon the 2023 Neighbours reboot as Haz Devkar, who is introduced as the new manager of Harold's. After Haz leaves Erinsborough, Nicolette Stone (Hannah Monson) recommences her position as manager of Harold's.

=== Lassiters Hotel ===
Lassiters Hotel is a ten-story tower block hotel in Erinsborough. It is part of a worldwide chain of hotels in places like Darwin, London, Montana, and New York. The hotel's grounds form a courtyard area, known as the Lassiters Complex, where several independently managed businesses are located. Lassiters used to have a shopping arcade, which had a bookstore, chemist, clothes shop, and gift shop inside. Characters often stay at the hotel and are seen socialising and working there. Lassiters was originally owned by Jack Lassiter (Alan Hopgood) when it first began appearing in Neighbours. On behalf of The Daniels Corporation, Rosemary Daniels (Joy Chambers) purchased the hotel in 1987. To this day, the Corporation holds a majority share interest in Lassiters, and Rosemary's nephew Paul Robinson owns a majority share of the hotel. His former wife Terese Willis (Rebekah Elmaloglou) also owns shares in the hotel and was introduced as its manager in 2013. Scenes set in the interior of the hotel are filmed at the Global Television Studios. The exterior of the building is also one of several purpose-built sets at the studio.

In early 2010, the hotel was one of the many sets which underwent a makeover. A new black, orange and silver logo was introduced, and the courtyard updated. A new mezzanine level, which contains a dining area, was added to the hotel. The mezzanine later became the focal point of Neighbours' 6000th episode and viewers saw Paul pushed from it by an unknown assailant. Real-life applications for jobs at Lassiters have been sent in from members of the public, including one woman who sent in a full CV applying for a job on reception. In 2013, the top floors of Lassiters are turned into The Eclipse Apartments and Paul moves into the penthouse apartment. In the "Hotel Death Trap Week" storyline that aired in April 2016, an explosion rips through the hotel, destroying it and causing the deaths of Josh (Harley Bonner) and Doug Willis (Terence Donovan). Although many characters have stayed at the hotel, the most notable of which are the members of the Robinson family, who have moved in an out of the penthouse to stay with Paul. Paul, Daniel Robinson (Tim Phillipps), Amy Williams (Zoe Cramond), Jimmy Williams (Darcy Tadich), Leo Tanaka (Tim Kano), David Tanaka (Takaya Honda), Harlow Robinson (Jemma Donnovan) and Abigail Tanaka (Mary Finn; Axelle Austin; Juliet Basaraba; Nikita Kato) have all lived there during their tenures on the serial.

Multiple characters have invested and owned in the hotel throughout the serial, including the Udugawa family – Mr. Udagawa (Lawrence Mah), Jasmine Udagawa (Kaori Maeda-Judge), and James Udagawa (Samuel David Humphrey), Pierce Greyson (Tim Robards; Don Hany), and the Sinclair family, consisting of Conrad, Reece (Mischa Barton) and Krista Sinclair (Majella Davis). In 2022, Shane Ramsay (Peter O'Brien) returns to Erinsborough and buys Lassiters from Paul after Paul loses a game of blackjack. Paul thinks about moving to New York with his children, but decides to stay put when Shane rips up the deal. Krista is installed as the executive consultant of Lassiters upon her move to Erinsborough, but later buys into 50% of the business, and is upgraded to co-manager with Paul.

=== Police Station ===
The Erinsborough Police Station is where the Erinsborough Metropolitan Police work. Many characters have been seen at the station, whether it is being arrested for a crime, visiting a friend or defending a client. In 2010, the station set underwent a significant revamp, with a large exterior, several interior rooms and office spaces added. The police station closed in 2012 and the building became the Erinsborough Community Centre. However, a year later, the Victoria Police purchase the Erinsborough News building and created a new Erinsborough Police Station.

The Police Station site in the Lassiters complex was previously home to several businesses. A Good Hair Day Salon was a beauty salon built in the Lassiters Complex in 1999, owned by Gino Esposito (Shane McNamara), who employed Lyn Scully (Janet Andrewartha) and Janelle Timmins (Nell Feeney). It was succeeded by the Erinsborough Veterinary Clinic, owned and run by Steve Parker (Steve Bastoni) between 2007 and 2009. Lastly, the Erinsborough News moved into the complex in 2010, with its set updated to include working interiors, which allowed camera crews to shoot indoors. Its main rival was the West Waratah Star. The paper's offices were first featured in 1987 when Scott Robinson (Jason Donovan) was offered a cadetship. Many characters have been employed as columnists, editors, reporters or feature journalists.

=== The Sonya Rebecchi Foundation ===
The Sonya Rebecchi Foundation (previously Daniels Corporation and Home James Office, Erinsborough Medical Centre, Tim Collins and Associates, Rebecchi Cammeniti, Rebecchi Legal, Rebecchi Kapoor Law and Rebecchi Law) was originally a florist shop when the Lassiters complex first appeared. It is later turned into an office for the Daniels Corporation when they begin managing the hotel. Helen Daniels' (Anne Haddy) chauffeur business Home James also starts operating from there. The office is stopped being used by Lassiters in 1994. Karl Kennedy (Alan Fletcher) takes it over and turns it into his medical practice. Four years later physiotherapist Ruth Wilkinson (Ailsa Piper) takes over the other half of the office for her business. Karl leaves in 2006 and his office is taken over by Rosetta Cammeniti (Natalie Saleeba) and then by Charlotte Stone (Rachel Gordon). It then becomes part of the law practice, Tim Collins and Associates.

The company had taken over half of the office in 2004, with lawyer Toadfish Rebecchi (Ryan Moloney) moving in. Rosetta regains the office from Charlotte and she and Toadie remain there until they both quit the firm. They later set up their own company and buy the premises. Rebecca Napier (Jane Hall) and Samantha Fitzgerald (Simone Buchanan) are also employed there. The firm is renamed Rebecchi Legal in 2008 and Toadfish remains the only employee. He later forms a partnership with Ajay Kapoor (Sachin Joab) and the firm is called Rebecchi Kapoor Law. Following Ajay's departure, Toadie runs the offices on his own. Following Toadie's departure from Erinsborough, the foundation established in memory of his wife Sonya Rebecchi (Eve Morey), is evicted from the Community Centre, resulting in it being relocated into the vacant law office.

=== The Waterhole ===
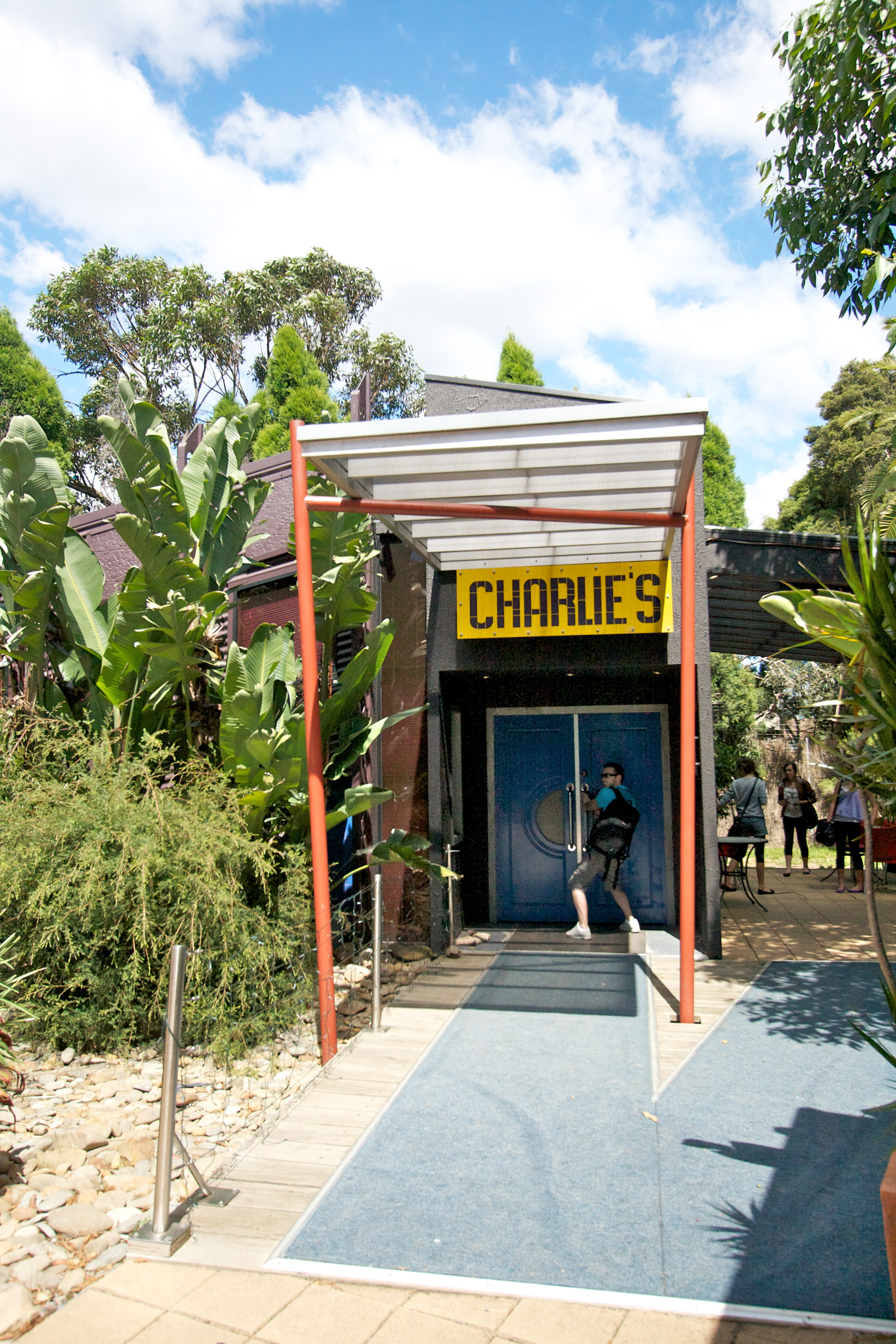
Exterior of The Waterhole as it appeared in 2007–2014

The Waterhole (previously Chez Chez, Lou's Place, Scarlet Bar and Charlie's) is a bar and restaurant that has always been a focal point of Neighbours. It has provided many characters with employment. From 1986, The Waterhole was the official Lassiters Hotel bar and was run by Madge Bishop (Anne Charleston). A gas leak in the basement caused an explosion, which destroyed the pub and injured Stephen Gottlieb (Lochie Daddo). The Waterhole was rebuilt and purchased by Cheryl Stark (Caroline Gillmer). Cheryl renamed the pub Chez Chez and it became an independent business. Lou Carpenter inherited the pub after Cheryl died and he called it Lou's Place. Max Hoyland (Stephen Lovatt) bought into the business in 2002. Two years later Lou's Place was set on fire and burnt to the ground by Paul Robinson. A new bar was then built on the site. Max purchased the pub with his sister Izzy (Natalie Bassingthwaighte) and they turned it into a "groovy wine bar" called Scarlet Bar. Of the new look TV Week said "the vibe is a good deal more hip here than the previous and very traditional watering hole, Lou's Place." An office was also built into the bar.

Izzy later sold her half of the bar to Max, and he gave it to Stephanie Scully. Steph revamped the bar in 2007 and named it Charlie's after her son. In late 2008, the bar was brought by Elle Robinson (Pippa Black) and run by Rebecca Robinson (Jane Hall). Many singers and bands performed guest appearances in the bar, including Kate Ceberano and Ben Lee. In 2012, it was revealed onscreen that Celeste McIntyre (Cassandra Magrath) was managing Charlie's. Celeste hires Kate Ramsay (Ashleigh Brewer) to replace her, while Natasha Williams (Valentina Novakovic) is employed as a barmaid and waitress. A few months later, Paul and Andrew Robinson (Jordan Smith) become the new co-owners of the bar. In 2013, Sheila Canning (Colette Mann) is hired as a barmaid and later becomes the new manager. In 2014, the set underwent a makeover and the bar reverted to its first name, The Waterhole. The bar has "an industrial ambiance using natural timber and patina steel". A garden courtyard provides extra light. The revamp was unveiled on-screen later that year. A statement from Neighbours said the name was "a nod to Neighbours' long and colourful history while ensuring the series maintains a contemporary feel."

A writer for Inside Soap thought Chez Chez was an inappropriate name for a pub, saying "If Cheryl Stark's Chez Chez had been a fabulous bar in Paris, then perhaps the dodgy French pun would have worked. But considering it was a run-down pub in Melbourne run by the most gaudily dressed woman in the Southern Hemisphere, it didn't really come off, did it?" In June 2003, Blackthorn Cider carried out a survey of 2,000 pub goers, who voted Lou's Place as one of the best television pubs of all time. The pub came in seventh place, while character Toadfish Rebecchi (Ryan Moloney) was voted the third best television pub goer. In 2008, the pub was named one of the top ten television pubs and bars by Anna Pickard of The Guardian. She said "Although the Coffee House in Neighbours was arguably more important to the residents of Ramsay Street, Lou's gets included by dint of having the most rubbish name for a TV pub ever. Although it's not called that anymore. It's probably called something immeasurably better now like The Place That Serves Beer. In September 2014, a Soap World columnist praised the name change, saying "the rebranding of the pub with the iconic 'Waterhole' moniker has been a great move."

=== Flamingo Bar ===
The Flamingo Bar was a beach bar located on the fringes of Lassiters Lake, which opened in 2021. The constructed sandy area around the bar has been recreationally used for a volleyball tournament and a Longest Workout competition, involving a number of characters. Following her reintroduction, Amy Greenwood (Jacinta Stapleton) becomes the manager of the venue, with Roxy Willis (Zima Anderson), Jesse Porter (Cameron Robbie) and Ned Willis (Ben Hall) employed as bar staff. The Flamingo Bar is destroyed in early 2022 when a pylon falls on it during a storm, killing Britney Barnes (Montana Cox).

== Power Road ==
=== The 82 ===
The 82 is a bar and diner in a static W-class Melbourne tram. The show acquired tram 907 in October 2018, and announced it would form a new set. It will not be a working tram, and has been permanently welded down on the show's backlot. On-screen, the tram is delivered to Erinsborough after Karl Kennedy's (Alan Fletcher) sister buys it for him as a gift. He plans for it to become "a point of interest" in a part of the neighbourhood which is undergoing a regeneration. Other characters become involved in the storyline as they help refurbish the tram. An accident in the tram in 2021 saw the end of a love triangle storyline and threatened Dipi Rebecchi (Sharon Johal) and Amy Greenwood's (Jacinta Stapleton) lives.

=== Fitzgerald Motors ===
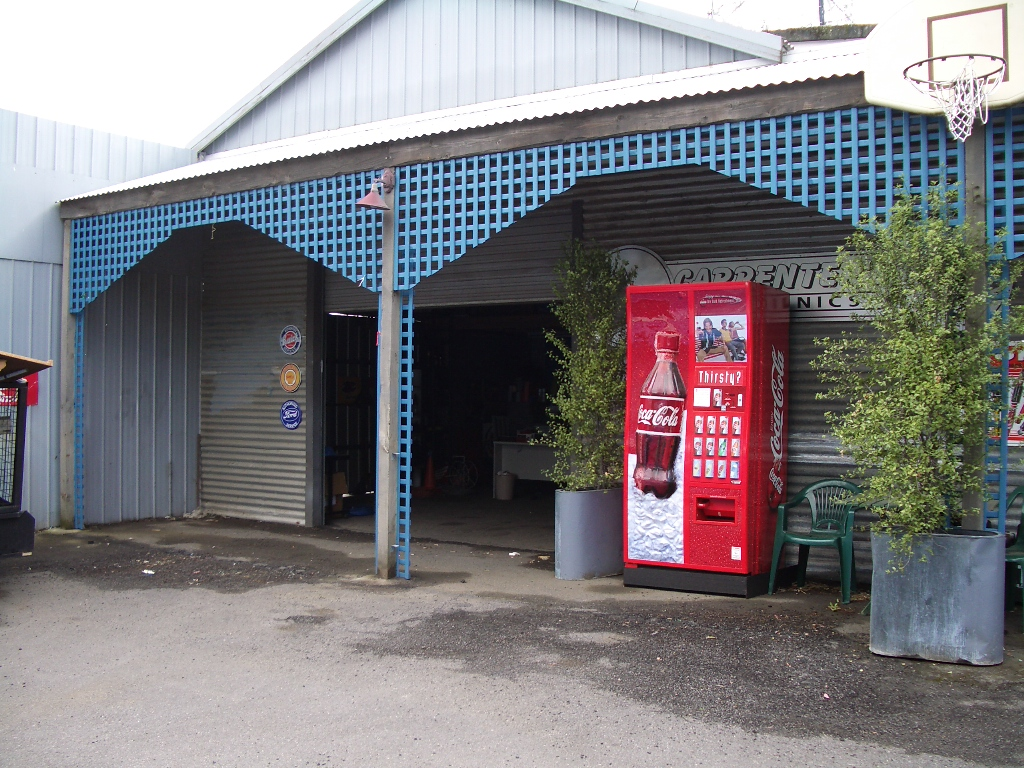
Fitzgerald Motors (2006)

Fitzgerald Motors (previously Carpenter's Mechanics) is the local fictional garage, where many of the characters take their cars to be serviced. The garage was first owned by Lou Carpenter (Tom Oliver), who bought it in 1997, after deciding to expand his business empire. Lou offers mechanic Ben Atkins (Brett Cousins) a chance to go into partnership with him, but Philip Martin (Ian Rawlings) decides to buy a two percent share of the garage to stop the arguments. After Ben leaves for Sydney, Lou hires mechanic Drew Kirk (Dan Paris). Drew later buys into the garage and is a partner until his death in 2002. Stephanie Scully (Carla Bonner) takes over the business on behalf of Drew's widow, Libby Kennedy (Kym Valentine). When she becomes pregnant, Steph gives Christine Rodd (Trudy Hellier) the manager's job. Janae (Eliza Taylor) and Janelle Timmins (Nell Feeney) then buy the garage from Lou and Libby.

After Janae leaves Erinsborough, the garage is taken over by Lucas Fitzgerald (Scott Major). Elle Robinson (Pippa Black) later buys the garage and Steph returns to work there in 2009. Following Steph's departure, Lucas takes on Chris Pappas (James Mason) as an apprentice. Lucas purchases the garage from Elle and renames it Fitzgerald Motors. He sells the business to Danni Ferguson's (Laura McIntosh) mother in 2013, and she employs Mark Brennan (Scott McGregor). His younger brother, Tyler (Travis Burns), comes to Erinsborough in 2015 to work at the garage and shortly after, Mark quits to re-join the police force. Local businessman Dennis Dimato (David Serafin) later purchases the garage. Lucas later purchases the garage back, promotes Tyler to manager and briefly employs Steph upon her return to Erinsborough. Mark is dismissed from the police force and returns to the garage, taking over as manager when Tyler is arrested on a murder charge. Bea Nilsson (Bonnie Anderson) begins an apprenticeship at the garage. Following Bea's departure, the garage did not feature as frequently in Neighbours. In 2024, Shane Ramsay (Peter O'Brien) buys the garage off Lucas for his son Max (Ben Jackson) to operate. The garage is burned down on the fortieth anniversary, when Lachie Jensen (Jack Hayes) throws a burning drink through the window, targeting Max.

=== Grease Monkeys ===
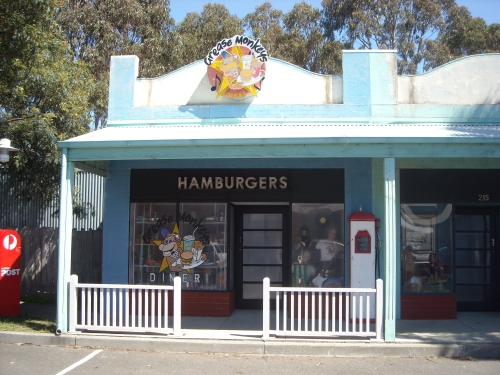
Grease Monkeys (2008)

Grease Monkeys is a fast-food restaurant, which many characters have dined in since 1999. The restaurant is located across the street from Carpenter's Mechanics. It was opened by Portia Grant (Sue Ingleton), and later managed by Madge (Anne Charleston) and Harold Bishop (Ian Smith). In 2015, Dennis Dimato (David Serafin) purchases Grease Monkeys as a puppet store for his criminal activities, until he is jailed.

=== The Handywoman ===
The Handywoman (also Carpenter's Cars, Erinsborough Motors and Dial-A-Kyle) is an independent builders yard run by Amy Williams (Zoe Cramond). The site was previously used for Lou Carpenter's (Tom Oliver) used car business, Carpenter's Cars, which he opened in 1992 and sold three years later. In 2010, during a revamp of the sets, a used car yard was re-added next to the garage. On-screen, Lou buys the car yard, naming it Erinsborough Motors. He later sells his stock to help pay his debts, but he keeps the land and briefly becomes a silent partner in Kyle Canning's (Chris Milligan) handyman business, which is named Dial-A-Kyle. The storyline was named one of the "Top 20 Aussie Soap Moments of 2011" by Channel 5. Kyle later sells the business to Amy, who renames it The Handywoman. Following Amy's departure Kyle managed the business, however it featured less frequently as Kyle managed the 82.

== Ramsay Street ==
Ramsay Street is the residential cul-de-sac where many of the characters of Neighbours have lived over the years. The street was named after Jack Ramsay, the grandfather of original character Max Ramsay (Francis Bell). The street has only featured six houses on-screen, and the numbers of the houses go from 22 to 32. However, the seventh house - Number 34 - was featured during the soap's 8000th episode. Ramsay Street is in fact the end of a long road and the rest of the street's numbers are on the other side of a main road that bisects it. Pin Oak Court, in Vermont South, is the real life cul-de-sac that doubles for Ramsay Street. Neighbours has been filmed in Pin Oak Court since the series began in 1985 and it has since become popular with tourists.

== Other locations ==
- Blaze Outreach (previously PirateNet and Off Air) is the home of a youth program initially run by Brad Willis (Kip Gamblin), and later managed by Father Jack Callahan on behalf of the church. The building was previously used as a radio station called PirateNet, which was first seen in April 2009, when Zeke Kinski (Matthew Werkmeister) began broadcasting his show under the alias of "Lost Boy". The radio station was located in a warehouse by the local skate park. During her guest appearance in 2009, British singer Lily Allen filmed her scenes on the PirateNet set, before performing her song, "22". PirateNet was later turned into a community station, and a bar run by Daniel Robinson (Tim Phillipps).
- Bounce is a swim and surf wear shop within a shopping centre, left to Toadfish Rebecchi (Ryan Moloney) by a client. He runs it with Connor O'Neill (Patrick Harvey), and later Serena Bishop (Lara Sacher).
- The Eastside Dingoes Football and Sporting Club is home to the Eastside Dingoes football team and the local gym, which is used by many of the residents. It first appeared on-screen in 2008, when Bridget Parker (Eloise Mignon) began working on the reception desk. Brad Willis (Kip Gamblin) becomes the gym's manager in 2013, before his son Josh (Harley Bonner) takes over the following year.
- Erinsborough Community Centre is the local community centre, which is formed when the Erinsborough police station is closed in 2012. A previous community centre was used by the residents while the Lassisters complex was being rebuilt during 2005.
- The Flametree Retreat (also Erins Burrow Motel and Robinsons) is a health and wellbeing centre owned by Stephanie Scully (Carla Bonner) and Lyn Scully (Janet Andrewartha). It was formerly a motel owned by Paul Robinson (Stefan Dennis) and Steph and it had a restaurant called the Flametree.
- Goodwood Women's Prison is the local female detention centre where prisoners are either remanded awaiting trial or arraigned following sentencing.
- The Hive (also the Men's Shed and Erinsborough Backpackers) is the original home of the Blokes Club, which was set up by Zeke Kinski (Matthew Werkmeister) and Declan Napier (Erin Mullally). In 2017, Leo Tanaka (Tim Kano), with the help of Tim Collins (Ben Anderson), buys the Men's Shed and converts it into the Erinsborough Backpackers hostel. A storyline airing that same year saw David Tanaka (Takaya Honda) and Piper Willis (Mavournee Hazel) injured when a ute crashes into the building. In 2020, the set was redressed and turned into The Hive, an art and exhibition space run by Ned Willis (Ben Hall). The space was bought by the second Sheila Canning (Shareena Clanton) in 2021, resulting in Ned quitting as manager.
- The Pacific Bank features prominently in the series' early years, most notably as the workplace of Des Clarke (Paul Keane) and Julie Robinson (Vikki Blanche).
- The Power Hour Shed is a gym co-owned by Mishti Sharma (Scarlet Vas) and Aaron Brennan (Matt Wilson).
- Erinsborough Primary School is the local primary school that many of the younger residents have attended since 1985. Lucy Robinson (Kylie Flinker) was one of the first characters to attend the school.
- Sonya's Nursery is a florist and a community garden centre that is established by Sonya Mitchell (Eve Morey) in 2011. Sonya gives up her job as a guide dog trainer to purchase the land, which was once the community gardens, and turn it into a garden nursery. Morey told Inside Soap in 2011 that Sonya just wants to "plant beautiful things and watch them grow." Sonya's husband Toadie Rebecchi (Ryan Moloney) continues to own the business after her death, though by 2024 the Nursery has become neglected.
- Warrinor Prison is the local male detention centre.

== Locations outside Erinsborough ==
- Yorokobi (also Baker's Hill Winery) is a vintage vineyard first shown in 2019, under the ownership of Pierce Greyson (Tim Robards; Don Hany). Panton Hill Winery is used for exterior filming of the vineyard. The winery is chosen as the setting for Pierce and Chloe Brennan's (April Rose Pengilly) wedding ceremony. A storyline in 2021 saw Leo Tanaka (Tim Kano) buy the winery from Pierce and develop it as an events and function space, allowing it to feature as a recurring location. As part of the series' increase in location filming in 2022, the winery and vineyard was featured in the opening titles. In 2024, Byron Stone (Xavier Molyneux), Nicolette Stone (Hannah Monson) and Kiri Durant (Gemma Bird Matheson) offer to co-invest in the business.
- The Back Lane Bar is a bar in the city frequented by the younger Ramsay Street residents. In early 2017, Tyler Brennan (Travis Burns) is briefly employed there as a barman. Leo Tanaka (Tim Kano) and Roxy Willis (Zima Anderson) buy the bar in 2019 with Vance Abernethy (Conrad Coleby) also briefly holding a stake.
- Eden Hills is a rich suburb that contains an expensive private school, Eden Hills Grammar. It is also home to Eden University, which has been attended by many of the teenage residents. In 2010, the university was heavily featured in storylines when Donna Freedman (Margot Robbie), Kate Ramsay (Ashleigh Brewer), Declan Napier (James Sorensen), Zeke Kinski (Matthew Werkmeister) and Susan Kennedy (Jackie Woodburne) enrol in courses. During the revamp of the sets for the 25th anniversary, the campus area underwent a makeover. A common room and rooftop café were also added to the set.
- Anson's Corner and Elliot Park are two other neighbouring suburbs that are often mentioned and sometimes seen on-screen. Anson's Corner contains a large shopping centre, and, upon her reintroduction in 2021, Melanie Pearson (Lucinda Cowden) moved into the suburb.
- West Waratah is a poor suburb and home to a caravan park where Lou Carpenter (Tom Oliver) and the Timmins family briefly lived. Waratah and Waratah Heights are adjacent suburbs.
- Greensborough is a nearby suburb that is 20 minutes away from Erinsborough.
- The V Bar is a small drinks venue in the Melbourne central business district, which Andrew Rodwell (Lloyd Will) and Holly Hoyland (Lucinda Armstrong Hall) frequent during their affair. Paul and Elle Robinson (Elise Jansen) later buy the bar as a business investment.

== Reception ==
A reporter for the Sunday Mail thought it was safer for the characters to stay in the suburb, commenting, "Whenever any Ramsay Street residents leave the cosy confines of Erinsborough, something bad always happens to them." When Erinsborough was entered into a "Most Liveable Suburb" competition, a Coventry Telegraph reporter scoffed at the idea, saying "Sure, if you can stand the frequent adultery, family feuds, drug abuse, kidnapping, deaths, health scares, hit-and-runs, financial ruin and marital breakdowns, then the sunny climate at least is rather agreeable."
