= Sonya Rebecchi =

Fictional character from Neighbours

- Neighbours character
- Portrayed by: Eve Morey
- Duration: 2009–2020, 2022
- First appearance: 14 August 2009
- Last appearance: 28 July 2022
- Introduced by: Susan Bower
- Spin-off appearances: Neighbours vs Zombies (2014); Neighbours vs Time Travel (2017)
In-universe information
- Other names: Sonya Mitchell
- Occupation: Guide dog trainer Garden nursery owner Mayor
- Father: Walter Mitchell
- Mother: Fiona Mitchell
- Half-sisters: Jade Mitchell; Zoe Mitchell
- Husband: Toadie Rebecchi (2013–2019)
- Sons: Callum Rebecchi
- Daughters: Nell Rebecchi; Caitlin Brennan (miscarried)
- Adoptive sons: Hugo Somers
- Grandmothers: Hilda Jones
- Uncles: John Mitchell
- Aunts: Robyn Lovell
- First cousins: Hayden Lovell

Sonya Rebecchi (also Mitchell) is a fictional character from the Australian soap opera Neighbours, played by Eve Morey. The actress auditioned for the role and began filming in June 2009. She made her first screen appearance during the episode broadcast on 14 August 2009. Sonya was introduced as a recurring guest character and dog trainer for established character Toadie Rebecchi (Ryan Moloney). Morey was promoted to the regular cast in July 2010 after producers noticed there was a good chemistry between Sonya and Toadfish. Sonya is portrayed as being good-hearted, funny and loving. She was once addicted to alcohol, drugs and gambling, but moved to Erinsborough for a fresh start. While working as a guide dog trainer, Sonya develops a relationship with Toadie, which ends when Toadie gets back together with his former girlfriend Stephanie Scully (Carla Bonner). However, when Sonya learns the relationship is a sham, she agrees to wait for Toadie. The couple eventually reunite, marry and start a family.

Sonya's estranged younger sister Jade Mitchell (Gemma Pranita) was introduced in late 2010, which led to the revelation that Sonya is the biological mother of Toadie's foster child, Callum Jones (Morgan Baker). Other storylines for the character have seen her open her own garden nursery, suffer marital difficulties, been targeted by a stalker and become Mayor of Erinsborough. Sonya was killed off as a part of a cancer storyline and her final episode was broadcast on 5 March 2019. Morey later made an uncredited cameo appearance on 1 January 2020. The character has been popular with viewers, and Morey has earned two Logie Award nominations, and three nominations for Best Daytime Star at the Inside Soap Awards. Morey made a cameo appearance as a ghost in the show's final episode broadcast on 28 July 2022.

== Casting ==
Morey successfully auditioned for the role of Sonya and joined the cast in June 2009 in a recurring capacity. Morey made her first screen appearance as Sonya during the episode broadcast on 14 August 2009. The show's producers noticed the chemistry between Moloney and Morey's characters, and Morey was promoted to the regular cast a year later. A writer for Holy Soap said that viewers would be seeing a lot more of Sonya in the future. In February 2011, Morey signed a new contract to stay with Neighbours for another year. She told the Daily Star, "It was great to know I'd be working for a year – from a struggling actor's point of view that is fantastic. But it also meant there is a year's worth of developing the character because she will become part of the bigger storylines instead of supporting." Morey added that she was loving her time on the show and the people she was working with.

Morey took maternity leave from the show in 2014 after giving birth to her first child. Sonya made a temporary departure to visit her son in the United States. In July 2017, Morey announced that she was pregnant with her second child. Producers chose not to write her pregnancy into the show, and Sonya made a temporary departure during 29 January 2018 for Morey's maternity leave.

== Development ==
=== Characterisation ===
Sonya is an animal lover who has previously worked for Guide Dogs Victoria. She is good-hearted and relished her role as a trainer. A writer for Network Ten's Neighbours website described Sonya as having a shady past and wanting to set up a new life for herself in Erinsborough. Sonya used to have alcohol, drug and gambling addictions, but she has worked hard to overcome them. Morey told a reporter from Channel 5 that she is similar to Sonya morally and ethically, plus they both want the best for the people they love. However, Sonya occasionally goes about things in a way in which Morey said she did not understand. The actress also struggled to understand the place of darkness that Sonya has been in too. When asked if her character could ever escape her past, Morey replied "I don't think she will every truly escape her past because ultimately I don't think she should. If she doesn't have it there as a reminder and a good motivator to help her stay on track." Morey revealed she would like to see Sonya reach her potential as a mother in the future.

In an interview with a What's on TV journalist, Morey said viewers relate to Sonya because she is "pretty normal". The actress noted that Sonya is not glamorous and there is "something quite humbling about her." Morey went on to say that Sonya's heart is usually in the right place and she always tries to do the right thing for the right reasons. Of her character's development, Morey explained "She has become a lot more self-assured and she has learnt to trust herself again. I think when we first met her, she was quite closed off and didn't want to let anyone in fear of hurting them." Sonya decides to give up her job as a guide dog trainer to buy and turn the community garden into a garden nursery. Morey told Jason Herbison from Inside Soap that she thought that the garden was symbolic of what Sonya is doing in her personal life. She explained "She made a lot of mistakes when she was younger. Now she just wants to plant beautiful things and watch them grow. She's very focused on that for now."

=== Marriage to Toadfish Rebecchi ===
"I think they're well-matched. I think they'll be together for a while, although they're going to go through the ups and downs every relationship faces. The thing about these two is it's not a question of them loving each other, it's a matter of whether or not things go their way."

— Ryan Moloney on Sonya and Toadie (2012).

When Sonya is sent to check up on the progress of Toadfish Rebecchi's (Ryan Moloney) guide dog puppy, Rocky, she "soon found love" with the lawyer. Sonya and Toadie began a relationship and Moloney thought that Sonya was perfect for Toadie. Moloney quipped "She's funny and a little bit zany and really accepting and loving as well." However, their romance comes to an end when Toadie tells Sonya that he has got back together with his ex-girlfriend, Stephanie Scully (Carla Bonner). A Sunday Mail reporter said Sonya was "simply heartbroken" and "devastated" after she was told about Toadie and Steph's relationship. However, she is unaware that Toadie is pretending to be in love with Steph to help cover up the fact she is carrying Daniel Fitzgerald's (Brett Tucker) child. Toadie becomes torn when Sonya tells him she loves him, but he carries on the lie. Of the situation, Moloney said "Toadie is in love with Sonya, but he's had to give up the chance to follow his heart. Now we see that he really wants nothing more than to be able to tell her he loves her and that he wants to be with her – but he just can't."

Toadie realises that Sonya still loves him when he notices she is still wearing the bracelet he gave her. Sonya tells him that she is not ready to take it off. Sonya tries to move forward with her life and starts dating David Foster (Ben Ridgwell). However, she is struggles with her feelings for Toadie. Morey told TV Week that Sonya is "completely in love with Toadie, but she's trying to move on as best she can – and that's where David comes into the picture." Despite only being with David for three weeks, Sonya agrees to move to Perth with him. Morey said that Sonya believes she has nothing left keeping her in Erinsborough and she wants a change of scenery. Sonya chooses not to tell Toadie that she leaving, so Lucas Fitzgerald (Scott Major) tells him instead. Steph then comes by and tells Sonya that Toadie still loves her and that their relationship is sham. Steph asks Sonya to stay if she wants more information and Steph later tells her that the baby is not Toadie's. Sonya is left shocked and relieved at the same time. Sonya agrees to wait for Toadie. When Steph's secret is eventually revealed, Sonya and Toadie start their relationship over. Morey told Herbison that due to how the relationship between Sonya and Toadie developed, it gave them a sense of history when they did finally get together.

Morey revealed that she would like to see Sonya and Toadie have children together in the future. She told a Press Association reporter, "I would love it. I think there is so much richness in Toadie and Sonya going on that journey together which lends itself to humour, sadness, more drama. Cross fingers they will go down that path." Morey also hoped Sonya could be happy in the future. Morey told the official UK Neighbours website in July 2011 that Sonya and Toadie would start to have some excitement and fun again following all the drama, but they would have to deal with a few issues first. When the subject of marriage comes up, Sonya and Toadie realise that they have different views about it. Morey explained, "At this point Sonya wants to get married for the wrong reasons, and Toadie doesn't want to get married for the wrong reasons. They haven't both independently reached a healthy perspective on it. She wants to do it for security to protect Callum, and he doesn't want to do it... He feels it will jinx [their relationship], because his other marriages have gone that way." Morey added that Sonya and Toadie have reached a point in their relationship where they have to make some big decisions, which could change the direction they move in.

In January 2012, Moloney told Sue Yeap from The West Australian that while Sonya was the one for Toadie, he did not think they would be getting married anytime soon. The actor believed Toadie did not need a piece of paper and a ring to tell the world that Sonya was "the love of his life." Sonya and Toadie begin planning to have a baby and Morey stated that she was "deliriously broody" at the prospect of her character becoming pregnant. She admitted that she loved the journey the couple had been on as they try to start a family, although she thought Sonya might go over the top with the situation, which would make it hard for those around her. She also believed that Sonya and Toadie would make "wonderful parents" because of the amount of thought they had put into the decision. She added that Toadie has always wanted a child of his own, while Sonya wanted to make up for her past problems. After failing to fall pregnant, Sonya gave up hope that she and Toadie would naturally conceive a child and she went through a "mourning process", before trying to move on. During a blood drive, Sonya was asked to take a pregnancy test and it came back positive. Both Sonya and Toadie were shocked, but delighted to learn that they were expecting a baby.

A few months later, Toadie asked Sonya to marry him. He had initially been reluctant to propose, as he had had bad luck with weddings in the past. Moloney commented to an Inside Soap columnist, "He's scared that marriage will change things between him and Sonya, as they're perfect at the moment." Toadie realised that with a baby on the way, he could not waste time and proposed to Sonya at the nursery. Sonya, who was "excited, but also a little bit shocked" accepted straight away.

=== Sister and secret ===
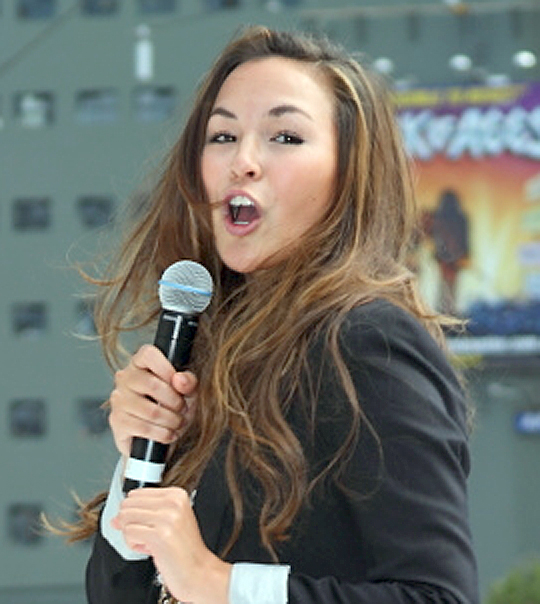
Gemma Pranita portrayed Sonya's younger sister, Jade.

In late 2010, Sonya's younger sister, Jade (Gemma Pranita) was introduced to the serial. A reporter from the Herald Sun stated that Jade's arrival would see her expose "a dark secret" held by Sonya. Before Jade arrived in Erinsborough, she and Sonya had been estranged from each other for seven years. Jade contacts Sonya out of the blue, leaving her "mortified" by the call. Pranita told Jackie Brygel from TV Week, "Sonya's response is 'Why are you calling me? Why now? Don't come anywhere near me!' But Jade keeps ringing and harassing Sonya and then rocks up on her doorstep." Pranita explained that Jade and Sonya share a bad history and that Jade has been holding on to one of Sonya's darkest secrets, which the people in Sonya's life know nothing about. The actress thought that Jade's appearance would "completely rock the boat", especially as she has the potential to cause trouble for her sister and expose her for lying to everyone.

During an interview with a Channel 5 journalist, Morey revealed that the last time the siblings saw each other, they were at their grandmother Hilda's (Maureen Edwards) home and Sonya was in "a very bad place". This causes Sonya to think that Jade might be in town to get some form of revenge. The sister's relationship is initially "rocky" and Sonya tries to get rid of Jade, before she can meet Toadie and his son, Callum. However, she runs out of time and Jade quickly realises that Callum is actually the child Sonya gave up to be raised by their grandmother. Jade demands an explanation and then urges her sister to tell the truth. However, after Jade sees how happy Sonya is, she becomes "fiercely supportive" of her. Pranita noted "It's almost the Mitchell sisters against Ramsay Street." Morey told Jason Herbison that she could not have asked for a better pretend sister in Pranita, adding that they had become good friends off-screen.

Jade's reappearance in Sonya's life precipitated the revelation that Sonya is Callum's biological mother. Morey admitted that she was "shocked" and "stunned" when the producers told her about the development for her character. She questioned how the storyline would come together, since there had never been any indication that Sonya was Callum's mother before. Morey explained "Initially, I thought, 'How could this work – Sonya being Callum's mum?', but then I realised it does work. All of a sudden, it creates even more depth and complexity to Sonya and the decisions she's made and her motivations for things like forgiving Toadie for his and Steph's sham marriage. There's this whole other layer." Morey called the storyline "phenomenal" and noted that it would change everything that viewers thought they knew about why Sonya became part of Toadie and Callum's lives. Morey researched how other people had reacted to similar situations and came to realise that the pieces fall into place, despite it being "a leap." She stated that Sonya had entered Callum's life, not to get him back, but to see if he was okay. However, she then fell in love with Toadie. The actress believed that it was not Sonya's intention to "plant herself in their lives", but it just happened.

When she was asked how Callum does not remember Sonya, Morey explained that Sonya had fallen in with a bad crowd, was an alcohol and drugs addict and was suffering from post-natal depression. She chose to leave Callum with her grandmother, Hilda, so she could get herself cleaned up. Hilda then had everything related to Sonya removed from the family. Callum was around four or five when Sonya left and Morey believed that he had blocked out the bad memories of her. Morey commented that Sonya's relationship with Callum would have been "a love-hate one" because she was only 16 when she had him. He would have become like a younger brother to her rather than a son. Executive producer Susan Bower defended the storyline when asked why Sonya and Callum's history had been rewritten. She told an Inside Soap columnist that they worked with the character's established backgrounds and found reasons and motivations for Sonya to act the way she did. Bower admitted that the only discrepancy that could be pointed out was Callum's age. When Hilda dies, Sonya becomes concerned that her secret will be revealed when Callum attends the funeral. However, Callum chooses to say goodbye to his great-grandmother privately, much to Sonya's relief.

Callum then explains that he wants to find his real mother and tell her that he hates her, which devastates Sonya. She tells her sister that she cannot tell him the truth now as she cannot handle him looking at her, knowing what she did. Callum steps up his investigation into the identity of his mother and is injured in an accident while looking for clues. At the hospital, he recalls a memory about his mother and realises that she is Sonya. Toadie then "angrily orders" Sonya to leave. Of the revelation, Morey said "For Toadie, it's a betrayal to both him and his son. He's angry, but his initial priority is to make Callum number one." Morey quipped that filming the scenes was "exhausting." The actress also explained that Toadie's reaction to finding out that Sonya is Callum's real mother was one of devastation, he has to question whether Sonya ever loved him or was only with him to get Callum. Morey told a writer for What's on TV that it had been "fun" to see Sonya change when she could finally be a mother to Callum. She added that Sonya would probably struggle with everything that happened with Callum, but she should remember that she has been forgiven.

=== Marriage problems ===
A year after their wedding, Sonya and Toadie's marriage came under strain. Toadie accused Sonya of neglecting their relationship, when she began to get involved in their friends' problems. Morey said, "Sonya and Toadie have been together for five years and, unfortunately, little things are starting to niggle – which doesn't mean they're over, or anything like that, but it's definitely causing a few issues for them." Morey explained that life had slowed down for Sonya and Toadie and they were getting into "the nitty gritty" of their marriage, which was challenging for them both. Things became worse for Sonya and Toadie when Jacob Holmes (Clayton Watson) kissed Sonya. Morey told Kirsty Nutkins from the Daily Express, "The kiss with Jacob was the first big crack in their relationship. Even though Sonya didn't have feelings for him, it hurt Toadie a lot." The actress said it was uncomfortable to play out the scenes involving her character's marital problems. She also found it frustrating, as she knew Sonya in particular was not learning from her mistakes. Morey thought Sonya and Toadie could benefit from better communication, and from Sonya telling people to seek help from other sources, like a counsellor. She also thought Toadie could help his wife out more often, especially if the person she was helping was his friend too.

Shortly after Naomi Canning (Morgana O'Reilly) was introduced, it was revealed that she would set her sights on Toadie. Morey doubted Toadie would have an affair, as it was not in his nature. She also said Sonya questions certain things that Naomi does, but then lets them go when she is proved wrong. Morey commented that Sonya and Toadie's relationship was vulnerable to Naomi. Morey told a What's on TV writer that Naomi undermines the things Sonya does, making "small wounds into big gaping bloody cuts." The actress added that she enjoyed working with O'Reilly, but their characters would never be friends as they were complete opposites. Sonya later learned that Naomi had kissed Toadie, and she was angry with her for lying and trying to undermine her marriage. When Naomi and Sonya came face-to-face, Naomi provoked Sonya by blaming her for the troubles in her marriage, causing Sonya to "impulsively" slap Naomi. Morey admitted that she was uncomfortable about having to slap O'Reilly, as they are friends in real life. Sonya later apologised to Naomi, but told her to stay away from her family. Morey called it a "pretty satisfying" moment.

=== Hate mail campaign and stalker ===
In October 2014, it was announced that Sonya would become the focus of a hate mail campaign storyline. Toadie received the first anonymous letter which made "damaging insinuations" about Sonya and her past. He initially kept the letter from Sonya, deciding that he would investigate on his own. Toadie ruled out Naomi and wondered if someone from Gamblers' Anonymous might have it in for Sonya. When Mark Brennan (Scott McGregor) also received a letter about Sonya, Toadie then told Sonya the truth leaving her "horrified" and fearing for her safety. Sonya's paranoia about the situation caused her to forgo her plans to take Nell trick-or-treating for Halloween and leave a GA meeting abruptly. When Patricia Pappas (Katerina Kotsonis) berated Toadie for his involvement in her son's court case, Brennan suspected Patricia could be the letter sender, but she too was ruled out. Shortly after, Sonya was falsely accused of child abuse when Nell had a fall at the park, while Sonya looked away for a brief moment. Sonya was then visited by a Department of Human Services worker after a formal complaint was made against her. The situation made Sonya realise that she was being watched by the same person who sent the letters.

Sonya's stalker was revealed to be her old school friend Erin Rogers (Adrienne Pickering). Erin broke into Sonya's home and admitted to sending the letters because she blamed Sonya for introducing her to drugs, which ruined her life. Morey commented, "Erin represents what could have happened to Sonya if she didn't get out of that life." After Erin was arrested, Toadie warned her to stay away from his family, while Sonya felt so guilty she paid Erin's bail. Sonya then vowed to make amends with Erin and helped her get a job at The Waterhole, but after Brennan exposed Erin as Sonya's stalker, she lost the job leaving Sonya "to pick up the pieces once again". On Christmas Day, Sonya began thinking about how Erin would be spending the holiday, which prompted Brennan to find her the address of Erin's squat. Sonya visited Erin with some food, but Erin told her to leave as she did not need her charity. Sonya then made it clear that she would be there for Erin when she needed her.

=== Ovarian cancer and departure ===
In early December 2018, Neighbours confirmed a character was being killed off in 2019, saying that "the devastating death of a fan favourite will change the lives of their neighbours – and us – forever." Speculation about Morey's imminent departure from the serial began shortly after when her co-star Sharon Johal (Dipi Rebecchi) posted a video to her Instagram account appearing to show Morey's leaving party. Baker (Callum) and Pranita (Jade) were also seen on set increasing the speculation that Sonya would be the departing character. On 11 January 2019, Duncan Lindsay of the Metro reported that Sonya would die in an upcoming storyline, after being left with weeks to live.

Later that month, it was confirmed Sonya would be diagnosed with ovarian cancer ahead of her departure. Sonya is admitted to Erinsborough Hospital after collapsing, and the doctors initially suspect that it has something to do with her recent poisoning. However, a large cyst is found on her ovary and a gynaecologist suggests that it should be removed quickly. Sonya is also told that she may have to undergo a hysterectomy, which leaves her "devastated", as she had hoped to have another child. Morey said that Karl treats Sonya and does not think her condition is serious, however, an oncologist then informs Sonya that the cyst was cancerous and it has already spread. Of Sonya's reaction, Morey explained: "It's a truly surreal moment for Sonya. Everyone's been putting on a brave face and only focussing on the positive. But then she receives the diagnosis – and no amount of sugar-coating will get away from the fact that this is a very serious situation." Morey also pointed out that her character's chances of beating stage-four cancer were "extremely slim", but Sonya is willing to try whatever treatments are available. Morey hoped the storyline would raise awareness of ovarian cancer, adding that it was Ovarian Cancer Awareness Month in the UK in March.

Morey revealed that it was not her choice to leave the serial, but once she knew Sonya was being written out, she asked for her to be killed off, knowing that she would never leave Toadie and the children. Morey explained, "I didn't want her to go off the rails again, if you make someone unlikable because they're leaving you end up not caring they're going! I feel death was the only option in order to be true to them." The character's last scenes aired on 5 March 2019. Sonya is informed that her cancer has spread and her condition quickly deteriorates during a road trip with her family. As she watches her children at the beach, Sonya dies in her husband's arms.

On 7 December 2019, it was announced that Morey would make a cameo appearance. Sonya appears in a video message that Toadie watches as he spends his first New Years without Sonya. The message then inspires Toadie to honour Sonya and find more ways of bringing her values into Nell and Hugo's lives. The character's appearance aired on 1 January 2020.

== Storylines ==
Sonya comes to Ramsay Street to assess the progress of a guide dog puppy being trained by Toadfish Rebecchi (Ryan Moloney) and his son Callum Jones (Morgan Baker). Sonya offers to give Toadie and Callum some private lessons to help with the puppy's training. Toadie asks Sonya out, but she turns him down, telling him she does not date clients. Toadie comes to believe Sonya is romantically involved with his friend Lucas Fitzgerald (Scott Major), when he sees them together, but Sonya admits that she is actually Lucas's sponsor at Gamblers Anonymous. Sonya agrees to go on a date with Toadie and they begin a relationship. However, it comes to a sudden end when Toadie tells Sonya that he is back together with Stephanie Scully (Carla Bonner). Sonya tells Toadie she loves him, but he rejects her. Lucas uses Sonya to make Toadie jealous, causing a brief rift between them. Sonya relapses and visits a racing track, before going to a club and getting drunk. Libby Kennedy (Kym Valentine) takes her home to Lucas and Sonya tells him she will sort herself out. Sonya decides to move to Perth with her new boyfriend David Foster. Steph then tells Sonya that her upcoming wedding to Toadie is a sham to cover up the fact that she is carrying Libby's estranged husband Dan's child. Sonya agrees to wait for Toadie, and they begin dating again.

Sonya moves in with Toadie and Callum. Her sister, Jade Mitchell (Gemma Pranita), comes to visit, but Sonya is keen to get rid of her. Jade meets Callum and realises that he is Sonya's son, that she left with their grandmother. Callum tries to find his mother. After an accident, Callum is rushed to hospital and he realises that Sonya is his mother. Sonya confirms it and a devastated Toadie asks her to leave. Callum begins meeting Sonya in secret and she tells him that she left him with her grandmother because she was in a bad place due to her addictions. Sonya's ex-boyfriend and Callum's father, Troy Miller (Dieter Brummer), comes to Ramsay Street. Sonya introduces Callum to Troy and she tries to reconnect with Toadie. Troy kisses Sonya, but she realises she still loves Toadie and they get back together. Troy reacts badly and he punches Toadie, shouts at Callum and tries to force Sonya into having an emotional breakdown. He leaves shortly after. Sonya decides to buy the community gardens and turn the land into a garden nursery. Sonya unsuccessfully applies for a loan, but Toadie begins working for a law firm and gets the loan, allowing Sonya to buy the gardens. Sonya and Toadie decide to bring their plans to try for a baby forward, but worry when Sonya does not become pregnant.

Sonya and Toadie undergo fertility tests and Rhys Lawson (Ben Barber) tells them that Toadie has a low sperm count. After almost giving up on the idea of having a baby, Sonya takes a standard pregnancy test before donating blood, and Rhys tells her she is pregnant. Troy returns to town and moves next door to Sonya and Toadie. He tries to gain custody of Callum and takes an intervention order out on Toadie, causing Sonya to collapse from the stress. When Troy refuses to let Callum leave his house, Sonya and Jade force their way in and Troy locks them inside. When Sonya and Jade escape, Troy falls and sustains a head injury. After he discharges himself from hospital, Troy goes to Callum's school and is confronted by Sonya and Toadie. Troy leaves, but falls unconscious at the wheel of his truck and dies. Toadie's cousin, Georgia (Saskia Hampele), moves in and bonds with Sonya over the baby. Toadie proposes to Sonya and she accepts. Sonya goes into labour two weeks early and due to complications, she has to be rushed to hospital, where she gives birth to Nell (Scarlett Anderson) via caesarean section. Sonya undergoes surgery for internal bleeding, before she is reunited with her daughter.

Toadie's mother, Angie (Lesley Baker), arrives for Nell's naming day and instantly clashes with Sonya, who feels that Angie is criticising and undermining her parenting skills. Sonya asks Angie to leave when she catches her going through her bag looking for drugs. When Angie returns for the wedding, she and Sonya make up. After Sonya and Toadie marry, Sonya sees Mason Turner (Taylor Glockner) and Robbo Slade (Aaron Jakubenko) shortly after they tried to rob Lassiter's. A gas bottle explodes at the reception, destroying the marquee and knocking Sonya unconscious. She suffers a fractured skull and a bleed on the brain, which lead to memory loss. Toadie organises a surprise vow renewal ceremony and Sonya gets her memory back. Sonya is delighted when her estranged uncle Walter (Chris Haywood) turns up in Erinsborough. However, she is devastated when Walter steals money from the nursery and reveals that he is an impostor. Sonya struggles to cope with the deception and becomes scared of relapsing. Robbo returns to Erinsborough and he intimidates Sonya. Robbo spikes her drink; however, it is Toadie who drinks it. Robbo dies after being involved in a hit-and-run and Toadie becomes the primes suspect for a while, as he cannot recall his movements that night. When Toadie is sued by Eric Edwards (Paul O'Brien), Sonya befriends his wife, Mandy (Emelia Burns). Sonya arranges a dinner, so they can talk and work things out, but she ends up fighting with Toadie. However, this causes Mandy and Eric to realise they need to sort out their problems and Eric drops the lawsuit. Sonya begins an online blog about parenting and is soon contacted by Jacob Holmes (Clayton Watson), who is raising his son, Elliott (Ryder Smyth) alone. Jacob leaves Elliott with Sonya and she fears he will never come back. She struggles to cope with two young children, especially when Elliott becomes sick. Toadie contacts Elliot's maternal grandparents despite Sonya's objections. Jacob soon returns for Elliott. When Jacob kisses Sonya, she ends their friendship. When Toadie discovers the kiss, he feels betrayed and Sonya recognises that Toadie no longer trusts her, putting strain on their marriage.

Sonya becomes the convenor of the local Gambler's Anonymous support group and meets Patricia Pappas, the mother of her neighbour Chris's (James Mason) mother. She learns that Patricia does not know that Chris's boyfriend Hudson Walsh (Remy Hii) is serving time in prison for murder, and inadvertently reveals Chris's secret to her. Soon after Patricia is arrested for theft to fund her gambling, leading to Chris discovering her secret. Chris is angry with Sonya, calling her a hypocrite. However, Chris come to terms with his mother's problem, and turns to Sonya for advice. Sonya spends less time at home with Toadie, Callum and Nell, causing strain on her marriage. Toadie hires Naomi Canning as his personal assistant and her mother, Sheila (Colette Mann), warns Sonya to be wary of her daughter. Sonya reluctantly allows Callum to go to the United States after he wins an overseas scholarship. The problems in the Rebecchi marriage continue when Sonya starts spending all of her time helping Mark Brennan and Bailey Turner (Calen Mackenzie) through their issues. Sonya and Toadie have a big argument in public, and Sonya goes away with Nell. On her return, she learns Naomi kissed Toadie and Sonya slaps her during a confrontation. She later apologises to Naomi. Sonya and Toadie agree to cut back on their work, so that they can spend more time together, and eventually convinces Naomi to return to working for Jarrod as he loses customers. Sonya supports Paul Robinson (Stefan Dennis) when he falls ill with depression, allowing him to visit the nursery to be at one with nature. When Paul recovers, he uses the nursery, and Sonya, as a marketing campaign to try to get himself re-elected as mayor; however, the nursery is trashed by Jayden Warley (Khan Oxenham) in revenge as his mother Sue Parker (Kate Gorman) is the stand-in mayor. Paul convinces Sonya not to press charges against Jayden and Sonya realises that Paul did this to blackmail Sue into standing down as mayor.

Toadie tells Sonya that he has received poison pen letters about her and she becomes fearful of going out. Mark suspects that Patricia might be sending the letters, as Toadie is representing Josh Willis (Harley Bonner), who attacked her son. Sonya dismisses Mark's suspicions. After Nell has an accident at the local park, Sonya receives a visit from the DHS after someone makes a formal complaint against her. Sonya then realises someone is watching her. When she worries that another complaint to the DHS could result in Nell being taken into care, Sonya is tempted to drink some wine. Sonya's stalker breaks into her bedroom where Nell is sleeping and hits Mark over the head. The stalker breaks in again and is revealed to be Sonya's former best friend Erin Rogers. Erin blames Sonya for introducing her to drugs and the subsequent loss of her daughter to the DHS. Sonya feels guilty and pays Erin's bail. She also offers her a job at her nursery and gets her into a drug treatment program. Sonya lends Erin money to buy a dress, but she suspects Erin is meeting a drug dealer and follows her. She is assaulted and her bag is stolen. Erin later tells Sonya she did not buy drugs. Erin's daughter Cat (Maleeka Gasbarri) visits Erin and Sonya reveals that Erin was present at Cat's cricket games; Cat becomes upset as Erin did not reveal herself and leaves, causing Erin to fallout with Sonya again. Cat later returns and things go much better, but the pressure gets to Erin and she flees. Cat asks to live with Toadie and Sonya, but Sonya helps her reconcile with her foster mother instead. Sonya befriends Amy Williams (Zoe Cramond) and invites her and her son to stay at Number 30.

Toadie and Sonya decide to enlist Nell in childcare when she begins playing up, believing she does not get enough attention. During an open day for the new childcare centre, Toadie falls from an out-of-control bouncy castle and is left paralysed. Sonya struggles as Toadie refuses to accept how serious his injury is. She asks Amy to continue living with them to help with Nell while Toadie recovers. Angie briefly visits to help out, but soon leaves after clashing with Sonya. The neighbours organise a benefit for Toadie, which raises over $6000. Sonya is bitten by a Redback spider at the nursery, causing her to pass out. After receiving treatment, Sonya recovers at home. She and Toadie consider using the benefit fund to pay their bills, but discover the money has been taken. Amy's ex-husband Liam Barnett (James Beck) later reveals he stole the money. Steph returns to Erinsborough and Sonya is uncomfortable having her around. However, after she learns Paul was gaslighting Steph, Sonya invites her to move in with her and Toadie. Steph's ex-girlfriend Belinda Bell (Nikki Shiels) believes Steph has feelings for Toadie, and she threatens Toadie. When Sonya learns that Belinda is the theatre nurse during Toadie's spinal surgery, she interrupts the operation, causing a complication that leaves Toadie infertile. Worried that Steph is a threat to her marriage, Sonya offers Belinda a job as Toadie's nurse. Belinda quits after one day and Sonya's insecurities are exposed. She and Toadie begin attending counselling.

When Sonya learns the community centre is being demolished, she asks for Tim Collins's (Ben Anderson) help as he is interim Mayor, but he double-crosses her. Sonya runs against Tim for Mayor and wins. On becoming mayor she is confronted by protesters, Paige among them, against removal of trees for the laying of a pipeline. Sonya hires Aaron Brennan (Matt Wilson) as her assistant, but after he allows Tom Quill (Kane Felsinger) to view council documents, Sonya is forced to fire him. Tom begins threatening the Rebecchis, taking a photograph of Nell and breaking into the house. The Lassiter's boiler room explodes, and Sonya realises Toadie is trapped under the rubble. He is soon rescued. Sonya's uncle Walter (Greg Stone) arrives in town to reconcile with her. Sonya decides to read the accident report about her parents' deaths and learns Walter was there that night. He then reveals that he is her father, and that he was arguing with his brother about telling her the truth when the car crashed. Sonya also learns that she has a half-sister called Zoe Mitchell (Nicola Billie Gullotti), who has leukaemia and requires a bone marrow transplant. Sonya takes a blood test, but is found not to be a match, so Walter suggests that Nell be tested and Sonya goes through with it behind Toadie's back. Nell is a match, but Toadie and Sonya refuse to let her go through with the transplant. Callum is also found to be a match and Zoe and Walter leave to continue her treatment.

Sonya supports the creation of bike lanes in Erinsborough, but she faces opposition from Clive West (David Bradshaw). Susan is also upset at the decision as money will be taken away from the high school's remedial program. Someone vandalises Sonya's vehicle, a brick is thrown through Toadie's law office window, and snakes are let loose in the street, leading Sonya to think that she is being targeted by Clive. However, it turns out Steph is the target of a stalker. Sonya offers to be a surrogate for Steph and Mark, and they agree. The surrogacy is made public by Tim Collins in a bid to force Sonya to quit as mayor. When Steph is told that she has no viable eggs, Sonya offers to donate hers. The fertilisation goes ahead, but Steph changes her mind and asks Sonya to take the morning after pill, but Sonya refuses. Days later, she learns she is pregnant. Toadie's former wife, Dee Bliss (Madeleine West) turns up in Erinsborough to reconnect with Toadie. She also introduces him to their daughter Willow (Mieke Billing-Smith). Sonya and Toadie's marriage is strained while Toadie spends time with Dee and Willow. Steph ends her relationship with Mark, and he tells Sonya that he will raise the baby by himself. Sonya worries about Mark's friendship with Elly Conway (Jodi Anasta), and she threatens to keep the baby. During her second ultrasound, Sonya and Mark learn the baby is a girl, but when a possible abnormality is detected, they are advised to have an amniocentesis, which comes back clear. Sonya becomes stressed about the amount of time Toadie is spending with Dee, while he becomes jealous of her closeness with Mark.

When Dee and Willow go to London, Sonya tells Toadie to follow them. She starts to feel ill and Mark stays over with her. Nell tells Toadie that Mark is in bed with Sonya, resulting in an argument during a video chat. Toadie fails to close the chat window properly and Sonya sees him having sex with Dee. Mark then reveals that Dee is actually a woman named Andrea Somers, and Willow is not Toadie's daughter. Sonya's contractions begin and she is rushed to the hospital, where she has a miscarriage. When Toadie returns home, Sonya tells him that she wants to separate and he moves in with the Kennedys. Sonya becomes depressed and struggles to cope with her grief. She and Mark kiss, but Sonya realises that she just wants to remain friends. Sonya breaks her sobriety and begins drinking again. When Steph realises what is going on, she offers her help. While dropping Nell off to Toadie, Sonya sees a letter from a lawyer concerning divorce proceedings. Toadie tells her his mother, Angie, contacted the lawyer. Sonya also decides to contact a lawyer, but Toadie tells her he does not want a divorce. Sonya continues to drink and she collapses at a public event. Toadie seeks full custody of Nell and Tim Collins urges her to step down as Mayor. However, when her drinking problem is reported in the press, she is sacked. Sonya turns to gambling, but loses her money. She later remembers that she was the one who crashed Amy's ute into the Erinsborough Backers' injuring Piper Willis (Mavournee Hazel) and David Tanaka (Takaya Honda) and makes a confession to the police. She is then charged.

Attempting to get her life back together, she leaves Erinsborough for rehab, but Toadie soon learns that she has checked herself out. She gives Toadie power of attorney and asks him to sell the nursery to pay Leo Tanaka (Tim Kano). Toadie finds Sonya in a caravan with a former drinking friend. He asks Callum to come home and talk with Sonya, who agrees to return home. Sonya and Toadie reconnect via emails. Toadie represents Sonya at her trial, where she receives 240 hours community service. Sonya tells Toadie that she is not ready for them to get back together. But when Sonya thinks that Toadie has feelings for Amy, she agrees to see a relationship counsellor. Toadie begins seeing his own counsellor, who Sonya recognises as her former rehab counsellor and crush Sam Feldman (Alex Tsitsopoulos). When Sam admits his feelings for her, Sonya informs him she only loves Toadie. Toadie asks Sonya to meet him at Lassiters Lake if she wants to reconcile, but she falls from a chair and is knocked unconscious. Susan finds her and she is taken to hospital, where she and Toadie reconcile. Sonya and Toadie both decide that they want another child. Sonya receives a message from Jade, telling her that Zoe's cancer has returned. Sonya leaves for Los Angeles, taking Nell with her, on what was to be her first day of school. When Sonya returns from Los Angeles, she wants to track down Andrea to recover the money she defrauded them of and she does not want another baby. She later decides that she does want another baby and begins IVF, when Sindi Watts arrives with Andrea's baby, Hugo, and says that Toadie is the father. This is confirmed by a DNA test. Sonya is persuaded to abandon the IVF program and raise Hugo as her own. She initially finds bonding with Hugo difficult but welcomes him into the family with a naming day.

Sonya asks Paul to find Andrea, and his private detective finds her in a psychiatric facility in Hobart. Visiting Andrea in secret, Sonya discovers that Andrea believes she actually is Dee Bliss, and does not recognise either Hugo or Willow. Toadie is hurt when he discovers Sonya's secretive behaviour, but agrees to keep away from Andrea. The Rebecchis pay for Andrea's psychiatric care, stretching them financially. Sonya hires Alice Wells (Kerry Armstrong) as Nell and Hugo's live-in nanny and grows close to her, unaware that Alice is lacing her food with strong painkillers. As her dependency on the drug grows, Sonya's behaviour alerts suspicion from Toadie and her friends. She falls severely ill when Alice withdraws the painkillers; she nearly relapses but resists with Toadie's help. Infuriated by Sonya's strength, Alice poisons her with pesticide, revealing herself as Andrea's mother. She leaves Sonya for dead at the roadside, but Willow uncovers her grandmother's con and warns Toadie. Together, they rescue Sonya and she pulls through. After being discharged from hospital, Sonya experiences stomach pain for several weeks and ultimately collapses. Doctors find a large cyst on her ovary – unrelated to Alice's poisoning – and after she has it surgically removed, Sonya is told she has stage four ovarian cancer, which has already spread to her gastrointestinal tract, liver and brain. With Toadie's support, Sonya hides her diagnosis from her friends and family. Karl later tells her that she has a 25% chance of surviving for the next five years.

Sonya begins intensive chemotherapy but the situation becomes more stressful when Andrea sends lawyers to assess the Rebecchis' suitability as Hugo's guardians. Sonya uses her cancer as leverage and convinces Andrea to sign full custody of Hugo to Toadie. Sonya eventually reveals her diagnosis to her family and friends, who organise a fundraiser for her at The Waterhole. Callum returns from San Francisco to support Sonya, after Dipi contacts him. Jade also returns to Erinsborough, and the family plan a trip to a beach house. Sonya confides in Toadie's brother Shane Rebecchi (Nicholas Coghlan) that when she went to Tasmania, Andrea told her about a man who mistook her for a woman called Karen, as they look alike. Andrea believes that he was talking about the real Dee. Shane agrees that Sonya should keep it from Toadie for the moment. Sonya's oncologist informs her that the chemotherapy has had no effect on the tumour in her brain, and she only has days to live. Sonya experiences blurred vision and numbness in her hands on the road trip to the beach house. She tells Toadie that she does not have long left. As they make their way down to the beach, they stop and sit down to watch their children playing. Sonya decides that she does not want them seeing her in her current state. She says that she knows that heaven exists because it is with Toadie and her family, and after telling him she loves him, Sonya dies in Toadie's arms.

== Reception ==
For her portrayal of Sonya, Morey was nominated for Best Daytime Star at the 2011 and 2012 Inside Soap Awards. She received a nomination in the same category in 2017. In 2019, Morey received nominations for the Gold Logie Award for Most Popular Personality on Australian Television and Most Popular Actress.

Holy Soap said one of Sonya's most memorable moments was when she attended Toadie's sham wedding to Steph and agreed to wait for him. Critics for the Daily Record called Sonya an "extremely nice girl" and said she had become popular with fans. Cameron Adams of the Herald Sun was a fan of Morey, stating in February 2010: "it's good to see Eve Morey, who plays Toadie's lady friend Sonya, getting more screen time this year." The official UK Neighbours website said Sonya and Toadie's relationship had "seen more drama than most" and Bridget McManus of The Age branded Sonya a "clucky girlfriend." In July 2011, Morey's co-star Jackie Woodburne said Sonya was one of the best characters that had come into Neighbours in a long time. Alan Fletcher, who plays Woodburne's on screen husband, also praised Sonya and said the audience had really taken to her. The actor told What's on TV "They absolutely adore her. In a short space of time, Sonya was established as one of the favourite Neighbours characters. I think a lot of that has to do with the marvellous onscreen relationship that Eve has with Ryan Maloney (Toadie) and Morgan Baker (Callum)."

Holly Byrnes of the Herald Sun called Sonya "a beautiful woman." While Byrnes' colleague, Dianne Butler, said "Sonya's wondering how long they have to wait before they face the fact there could be something wrong with her. I say no time at all, Sonya. Which explains why she's gardening on her own in those opening credits." When Sonya and Toadie found out that they were expecting a baby, Claire Crick from All About Soap commented "At last – Sonya and Toadie are having a baby... and we can't think of a soapy couple who deserve such happy news! Not only do we totally love Toadie and Sonya (it's so refreshing seeing a couple who are happy together!), but they're also so clearly desperate to be parents." Crick later praised Sonya for helping Lucas and Vanessa realise their feelings for each other, saying "thank goodness for her meddling ways!" A Newcastle Herald reporter noted that Sonya "has seen more drama than most". In 2015, a Herald Sun reporter included Sonya being revealed as Callum's mother, plus her and Toadie's pregnancy plot in their "Neighbours' 30 most memorable moments" feature.

The character's final storyline and death episode received positive attention from critics and viewers. Conor McMullan of Digital Spy wrote a feature on the "most moving moments" from the ovarian cancer storyline. On the scene in which Sonya learned her cancer had spread, McMullan said "In frank and honest scenes, Neighbours didn't shy away in hitting Sonya, or viewers, with the tough facts – and the scene was much stronger for it. Despite being told that the cancer had spread through her body, Sonya's resolute determination to beat it broke our hearts." McMullan said the "father-daughter bond" between Sonya and Karl was "very sweet and real", and would be missed, as would her friendship with Lucas which was one of the "most memorable in recent years". After seeing Sonya's final episode, Laura-Jayne Tyler from Inside Soap wrote that Morey and Moloney's performances were "sublime, and deserve to win every award going." A campaign to secure Morey a nomination for the Logie Award for Most Popular Actress began on social media shortly after the episode aired.

Sonya was placed at number eleven on the Huffpost's "35 greatest Neighbours characters of all time" feature. Journalist Adam Beresford described her "one of the show's most beloved characters of recent times." Sonya gave the show "a grounded, relatable presence" and her traumatic past experiences earned her "some hard-earned empathy." Beresford believed that Sonya and Toadie were a new generation Karl and Susan owing to her marriage and her "strong moral compass". A reporter from The Scotsman included Sony and Toadie's wedding day explosion as one of the show's top five moments from its entire history.

After Sonya's brief 2022 return in the intended finale, Laura Denby from Radio Times called the return of Sonya and other deceased characters a "treat for fans" and noted that viewers were "heartbroken" by her 2019 death, also calling her return a "touching tribute to such an adored character" and her death scenes as "beautifully penned by producer Jason Herbison".
