= Zoe Davis =

- Neighbours character
- Portrayed by: Ally Fowler
- First appearance: 20 January 1986
- Last appearance: 3 September 1986
- Introduced by: Reg Watson
In-universe information
- Occupation: Waitress; Secretary

Zoe Davis is a fictional character from the Australian television soap opera Neighbours, portrayed by Ally Fowler. The actress was initially approached in 1985 about a role in the serial shortly before it was cancelled by Channel 7. When it was picked up by Network Ten, the role came up again. Fowler chose to put off a planned overseas trip to join the cast for a year. Fowler did not want to be typecast and felt that a year was just long enough. She began filming in the first week of December 1985 when production stated up again. She made her first appearance during the episode broadcast on 20 January 1986.

The character is portrayed as "a very vivacious 20-year-old romantic". She is streetwise and a "loveable liar". Writer James Oram called Zoe "fickle" and "blunt", while Josephine Monroe said she had a "devil-may-care" attitude. Zoe was introduced as an old friend of established character Daphne Lawrence (Elaine Smith), with whom she opts to stay with while she is in Erinsborough. Zoe longs for true love and producers developed a controversial relationship with older neighbour Jim Robinson (Alan Dale), which does not go down well with his family. Following a miscarriage, the couple break up. Fowler chose not to extend her contract with the show and she departed on 3 September 1986.

== Casting ==
After Possession was cancelled in May 1985, Fowler had "an availability check" made on her for an upcoming character in Neighbours, however, the serial was cancelled shortly afterwards. When Network Ten picked it up, Fowler wondered if the part would come up again and it did. She had been planning a long overseas trip when she was offered a year-long contract to play Zoe. She told Marie Ussher of TV Week that she had set herself a deadline of January 1986 to begin her travels, as her sister was living in England and a close friend had also gone overseas, but the Neighbours role stopped that. She hoped to travel after she finished with the show. Her casting was publicised in November 1985, and she began filming during the first week of December when Ten brought the show back into production. Fowler had concerns about typecasting, having played Angela Hamilton in Sons and Daughters for 18 months, and felt that playing Zoe for a year would be long enough. Fowler was also excited to be working alongside her former Sons and Daughters co-star Anne Haddy again. Fowler's casting came at a time when producers wanted to improve the show with the addition of several new and older cast members.

== Development ==
The character was initially billed as "a complex young woman. A very vivacious 20-year-old romantic who sees the world through rose-coloured glasses". Marie Ussher of TV Week said she would be a mystery to everyone but her friend Daphne Lawrence (Elaine Smith). Ussher called Zoe "a very sympathetic character" and expected viewers would enjoy her. She also said Zoe was "a loveable liar", and someone who "drives people mad" but she is easily forgivable as she does not intend to harm anyone. For Fowler, the character was unlike any she had played before. Comparing her to her characters Angela Hamilton in Sons and Daughters and Nicola Shannon in Possession, Fowler said Zoe was "a much lighter, happier character." Although she did not know everything about her, Fowler stated "She seems to be a fairly streetwise kid, but she's from a middle-class Australian family and, at this stage, she isn't bound up with any dreadful traumas." She added that she did not know what was ahead for Zoe and that anything could happen.

In his book Neighbours: Behind The Scenes, James Oram described Zoe as being "fickle and unpredictable to an incredible degree", she has a sharp wit and is also blunt, but not heartless. Josephine Monroe of The Neighbours Programme Guide said Zoe was both "charming and infuriating". She has a "devil-may-care" attitude towards finances, trouble and inconvenience. Zoe also had many careers, including; singer, dancer, saleswoman and waitress. Monroe commented that Zoe took her jobs seriously, but could not choose between them. The Daily Mirror's John Walsh branded the character "an insecure, flighty girl constantly searching for a true romance.

Ussher wrote that Zoe is "a voice from Daphne's past" and it was established that they knew each other growing up. Of her first scenes, Ussher explained that Zoe exits the airport "screaming and running" towards Shane Ramsay (Peter O'Brien), who is waiting for a family member, and begins kissing him. Ussher says it appears to be a case of mistaken identity, but the incident "isn't quite what it seems." Daphne "reluctantly" invites Zoe to dinner with her and her partner Des Clarke (Paul Keane), and they quickly realise they cannot get rid of her. Zoe decides to stay for Daphne and Des's wedding, and sets about "sinking her claws into Ramsay Street."

According to Oram, "romance is the only game she really likes to play and this she pursues most of all, but not always wisely." Zoe longed to be "truly in love", but it often eluded her. The character develops a controversial relationship with Jim Robinson (Alan Dale), which shocks the other Ramsay Street residents as Zoe is much younger than Jim. The couple also have very different personalities. Dale believed that there was nothing wrong with an older man being involved with a younger woman. Zoe and Jim's relationship does not sit well with Jim's family, and his youngest child Lucy (Kylie Flinker) is especially unhappy about it. Jim's son Paul Robinson (Stefan Dennis) makes things difficult for Zoe, but she is unaware that he actually has feelings for her. Jim proposes to Zoe and she later discovers she is pregnant. Jim was "reluctant" to become a father again and he and Zoe become distant, as she wants to keep the baby. However, Zoe collapses after suffering an ectopic pregnancy and she is left "heartbroken" when she miscarries the baby. The relationship ends soon after. Paul almost confesses his feelings to Zoe, but they are interrupted by the arrival of her ex-boyfriend, Tony Chapman (Peter Bensley).

In May 1986, Fowler announced that she would be leaving Neighbours. She chose not to extend her contract with the show after June. Fowler's character remained on-screen until September. TV Week's Patrice Fidgeon reported that Zoe would then be rested in case Fowler wanted to return to the show in the future. On-screen, Tony offers Zoe a job and proposes to her before they leave Erinsborough together. In 2016, Fowler re-joined Neighbours as another character, Nina Williams.

== Storylines ==
Zoe suddenly arrives in Erinsborough to see Daphne Lawrence, who she had not spoken to in years. She chats up Shane Ramsay (Peter O'Brien), Mike Young (Guy Pearce) and later Jim Robinson. When Zoe learns that Daphne is to marry Des Clarke, she convinces them to let her move in until after the wedding. Zoe's behaviour annoys Max Ramsay (Francis Bell), Paul and Clive Gibbons (Geoff Paine). Daphne reluctantly gives her a trial at the Coffee Shop, but she loses the job after buying too much champagne for an office party. Zoe later temps at the Daniels Corporation until Sue Wright (Gael Ballentyne) is promised the job, but Sue is not good enough and Zoe gets the job on a permanent basis. Des's ex-girlfriend, Andrea Townsend (Gina Gaigalas), and her son, Bradley (Bradley Kilpatrick), arrive and Zoe begins to feel jealous. She is also concerned about being frozen out of a relationship with Des.

Zoe begins dating Jim and Paul fears Zoe is out for his father's money. Jim's daughter, Lucy also dislikes Zoe and she is constantly rude to her. She pours a jug of water over Zoe and begins making nuisance calls. On one occasion, Zoe fetches a whistle and blows it down the phone. This leaves Lucy with a burst eardrum and she gives up. Her behaviour towards Zoe then begins to mellow. Des gives Zoe some counselling over her scratchcard addiction and warns her about going over the limit on her credit card. Zoe's addiction also concerns Paul. Zoe models for an advertising poster for the Coffee Shop to earn some extra money.

After a short stay at a guest-house in the mountains, Zoe returns to Ramsay Street and is much more mature. She pretends to be seriously ill, but Clive is not fooled, until Zoe suddenly feels a sharp pain in her stomach and collapses. She suffers an ectopic pregnancy and miscarries Jim's child. Zoe runs into her ex-boyfriend, Tony Chapman, and they rekindle their relationship. Tony asks Zoe to come and work for him, but she tells him that she cannot leave the Daniels Corporation. Paul falls for Zoe, but after a jealous outburst from him, Zoe leaves to work for Tony. Tony proposes to Zoe and she admits that she may not be able to have children. However, Tony wants to be with Zoe regardless of her situation and they get engaged. Zoe leaves Ramsay Street to move in with Tony. Zoe comes back to see Daphne when she is admitted to the hospital with meningitis. Zoe helps Susan Cole (Gloria Ajenstat) with her son, Sam (Thomas Hamston), while Susan goes for a job interview. Des learns that Zoe has taken out a second credit card and has gone over the limit, so he writes her a financial plan and forces her to cut up her cards. Zoe announces that Tony needs her to return to work for him and she leaves.

== Reception ==
Marie Ussher of TV Week said the character was introduced to the show "in a rather bizarre way". John Walsh from the Daily Mirror said the character was "a delightful addition to Ramsay Street", who "immediately causes trouble among the residents". Writer Josephine Monroe stated "Zoe was one of the wildest and most unconventional women Erinsborough ever knew." Fergus Shiel from The Sydney Morning Herald called Zoe a "saucy secretary." A writer for the BBC's Neighbours website said Zoe's most notable moment was "Causing Lucy to become temporarily deaf." They also called Zoe and Daphne's relationship "stormy". Donna Hay from What's on TV included Zoe and Jim in a list of soap opera "odd couples". Hay assessed that the affair "was doomed from the outset. She was committed to saving the world's wildlife; he thought the best place for an animal was on the barbecue."
