= List of Neighbours characters introduced in 1986 =

Neighbours is an Australian television soap opera that was first broadcast on 18 March 1985. The following is a list of characters that first appeared in the serial in 1986, by order of first appearance. All characters were introduced by the show's executive producer Reg Watson. The 2nd season of Neighbours began airing from 20 January 1986. The episode marked the first appearances of Zoe Davis, Madge Mitchell and Mike Young. Clive Gibbons and Nikki Dennison also arrived in January. Rosemary Daniels began appearing from February, while Nikki's mother, Laura, made her debut in March. The following month saw the first appearances of Jack Lassiter, Charlene Mitchell and Nell Mangel. Madge's brother, Tom Ramsay, arrived in May, along with Debra Fleming. Sue Parker debuted in June, while July saw the first appearances from Jane Harris and Sam Cole. Sam's mother, Susan, arrived the following month, along with Dan Ramsay. Ruth Wilson and Edna Ramsay debuted in September. Warren Murphy was introduced in October.

== Zoe Davis ==
Zoe Davis, played by Ally Fowler, made her first appearance on 20 January 1986. Fowler joined the cast shortly after producers decided to add several new cast members, in a bid to improve the serial. Zoe was described by James Oram, author of Neighbours: Behind the scenes, as being "fickle and unpredictable to an incredible degree", she is blunt and has a sharp wit. Josephine Monroe, who wrote The Neighbours Programme Guide, noted that Zoe was both "charming and infuriating". Zoe was an old school friend of Daphne Lawrence (Elaine Smith) and she came to Erinsborough for her wedding to Des Clarke (Paul Keane). She later developed a relationship with the much older Jim Robinson (Alan Dale), which shocked the other Ramsay Street residents.

== Madge Mitchell ==
Madge Mitchell, played by veteran actress Anne Charleston, made her first appearance on 20 January 1986. The character was introduced as Max Ramsay's (Francis Bell) elder sister. Max found Madge to be "formidable" and never won when she was around. Hilary Kingsley, author of Soap Box, stated that Madge was "loud, but likeable, meddlesome but cuddlesome, she has an opinion on everyone, ridiculous often but usually right." Madge went back to using her maiden name to avoid being associated with her ex-husband's debts. She is the mother of Charlene (Kylie Minogue) and Henry (Craig McLachlan). Madge's childhood sweetheart, Harold Bishop, (Ian Smith), was later introduced to Neighbours and he and Madge were later married. Charleston quit Neighbours in 1992, but when she suffered financial difficulties, she returned in 1996. She quit the serial once again in 2001.

== Mike Young ==
Mike Young, played by Guy Pearce, made his first appearance on 20 January 1986. Pearce auditioned for the role of Mike and immediately impressed casting director Jan Russ. Pearce joined the soap on 3 December 1985, three days after he finished his last HSC exam. He commented "I moved to Melbourne over the weekend and started Neighbours on the Tuesday. It was crazy. It was the whole, 'Say the words and don't bump into the furniture' thing. I had no idea what I was doing." Patrick Barkham from The Guardian called Mike "nice-but-lonely". While David Astle from The Sydney Morning Herald described Mike as "mullet-mopped" and "hunky."

== Clive Gibbons ==
Clive Gibbons, played by Geoff Paine, made his first appearance on 21 January 1986. A representative from The Grundy Organisation discovered Paine acting in a college production at the Victoria Arts Centre and asked him to do a screen test, before offering him the role of Clive. Clive was a doctor who ran a gorillagram agency. He brought a "breath of fresh air to Ramsay Street" when he moved in. Josephine Monroe, author of Neighbours: The First 10 Years, described Clive as being "one of life's eccentrics" who took care of people and often lured them into his latest harebrained scheme. Clive became so popular with viewers that a pilot for his own show called City Hospital was made, although it was not picked up by any television networks.

== Nikki Dennison ==
Nikki Dennison
- Neighbours character
- Portrayed by: Charlene Fenn
- First appearance: 28 January 1986
- Last appearance: 21 November 1986
- Introduced by: Reg Watson
In-universe information
- Other names: Lucy Robinson
- Occupation: Student
- Father: Tom Dennison
- Mother: Laura Dennison
- Aunts: Helen Daniels
- First cousins: Rosemary Daniels
- Other relatives: Paul Robinson; Scott Robinson; Lucy Robinson

Nikki Dennison, played by Charlene Fenn, made her first appearance on 28 January 1986. A representative from the Grundy Organisation discovered Fenn at a National Theatre workshop. She auditioned while studying for her HSC exams and was cast as Helen Daniels' (Anne Haddy) niece, Nikki. Of her reaction to winning the role, Fenn told Kelly Bourne of TV Week: "I was six feet off the ground when I first heard, but now I'm down to about two feet." Nikki was Fenn's first television role and she admitted to feeling "a bit apprehensive", but the cast had been friendly and helpful to her. Nikki "casually" enters the show during one of her visits to Helen and the Robinsons. Fenn explained her character's fictional backstory to Bourne, saying "Nikki originally came from a small Queensland town, but she attends a boarding school in Melbourne. Her mother is Helen Daniels' (Anne Haddy) sister, so sometimes Nikki spends weekends with the Robinsons." Bourne thought the situation seemed simple, but for Nikki it was more complicated. Fenn stated "Nikki's widowed mother works in a bar to send her to a good boarding school. But Nikki doesn't really appreciate this because she feels her mum has forced her into a position where she has to lie to be accepted by other girls." This leads to Nikki putting on airs and graces during the week, while she is a fun and normal teenager at the weekends. Fenn thought the two sides to Nikki made her a more interesting character to play. She preferred "the real Nikki", who does not have to impress anyone and can be genuine and fun. Fenn continued, "She can be quite charming when she's with the people she loves – the people who she knows love her simply for herself." Fenn was not keen on boarding school version of Nikki, as she has elements of bitchiness, snobbery, and social climbing. Fenn left Neighbours less than a year after she arrived and she commented "I never thought I was going to be employed in this for the rest of my life."

Nikki was raised by her mother, Laura Dennison (Carole Skinner), in Queensland. Her father, Tom, died when she was young and Nikki became spoilt as Laura gave her everything she wanted. Laura found it hard to deal with Nikki when she became a teenager and decided to send her to Erinsborough to stay with her aunt Helen. Nikki becomes good friends with Charlene Mitchell (Kylie Minogue) and she begins dating Mike Young (Guy Pearce), after he defends her from Sue Parker's (Kate Gorman) rumours. When Lucy Robinson (Kylie Flinker) wins a dinner date with Grant Kenny, Nikki tells her that her father will not let her go on the date and that Grant would not want to have dinner with a child. Nikki manages to persuade Lucy that she should go on the date instead and she gives her some money. Nikki does not tell Helen about the date and lies that she is spending the night studying with a friend. The date with Grant does not go well and he leaves after the main course. Nikki brags to Sue that she had a great night and that she kissed Grant. She also tells her that Grant is going to call her about a second date. However, Nikki's lies are exposed when a photo of herself and Grant appears in a newspaper. Mike then threatens to end their relationship. When Nikki hears that her mother has been diagnosed with multiple sclerosis, she leaves Erinsborough to be with her. When she returns a few months later, Nikki expects to pick up her relationship with Mike, but she soon learns that he is dating Jane Harris (Annie Jones). Nikki tells Jane that she wants Mike back. However, Mike tells her that he is not interested in a relationship with her. Nikki decides to leave Erinsborough permanently to spend time with her mother in the United States.

== Rosemary Daniels ==
Rosemary Daniels, played by Joy Chambers, made her first appearance on 20 February 1986. Rosemary remained on the show on-off for 24 years in a recurring capacity. A writer for the official Neighbours website described Rosemary as being "ruthless", while a Holy Soap reporter called a "tough businesswoman". A notable storyline for the character, saw her become engaged to Gerard Singer (Bryan Marshall) and then learn that he was having an affair with her mother Helen Daniels (Anne Haddy). Chambers returned to Neighbours from 6 July 2010 as part of the show's 25th anniversary.

== Laura Dennison ==
Laura Dennison
- Neighbours character
- Portrayed by: Carole Skinner
- First appearance: 21 March 1986
- Last appearance: 15 October 1986
- Introduced by: Reg Watson
In-universe information
- Occupation: Barmaid
- Sisters: Helen Daniels; Gwen Simpson
- Husband: Tom Dennison (backstory)
- Daughters: Nikki Dennison
- Nieces: Rosemary Daniels

Laura Dennison, played by Carole Skinner, made her first appearance on 21 March 1986. Laura is Helen Daniels' (Anne Haddy) sister. A picture of Laura sat on Helen's sideboard for years after her last appearance. Laura is also Nikki Dennison's (Charlene Fenn) mother. After she was widowed, Laura began working in a bar to help pay for Nikki's boarding school fees.

Laura's sister, Helen, invites her to Erinsborough for a holiday. Nikki refuses to spend any time with her mother and calls her an embarrassment when Laura flirts with Max Ramsay (Francis Bell). Laura is delighted when Max invites her to dinner and the evening goes well, until Max's son and sister return home. Laura goes back to Helen's and talks to Nikki about her attitude. Nikki chooses to leave her school and move in with Helen. Laura tells her sister that she is going back to her home town and just before she leaves, Nikki realises that she loves her mother and they reunite. They then spend the day repairing their relationship. Laura tells Max that she hopes they will remain friends before leaving. Helen goes to visit Laura and discovers that she has been diagnosed with multiple sclerosis. Nikki then returns home to care for her mother.

A few months later, Laura and Nikki return. Laura finds Nikki's over-protectiveness of her a little overwhelming and she arranges for Nikki to take part in an exchange programme in America, but Nikki refuses to go. Laura spills tea on herself and Helen begins to think that her sister cannot be left on her own. When Helen's friend, Grace Barnett (Marijke Mann), comes to Erinsborough, Laura realises that Helen is not aware that Grace had a one-night stand with her late husband, Bill. Laura convinces Grace to leave town, but when Helen matches her handwriting to a note left with some flowers on Bill's grave, Laura is forced to tell Helen the truth about Grace and Bill. Helen asks Laura to move out, but she soon realises that throwing her sister out is wrong and apologises. Laura takes up jogging and begins working some shifts at The Waterhole. Nikki asks her mother to slow down and Clive Gibbons (Geoff Paine) arranges for a counsellor to talk to her. Nikki later arranges for Laura to go to the United States and she joins her after her exams.

== Jack Lassiter ==
Jack Lassiter
- Neighbours character
- Portrayed by: Alan Hopgood
- Duration: 1986, 2013
- First appearance: 9 April 1986
- Last appearance: 16 September 2013
- Introduced by: Reg Watson (1986); Richard Jasek (2013)
In-universe information
- Occupation: Gold prospector Owner of Lassiter's Hotel
- Wife: Adeline Lassiter (backstory); Andrea Townsend (1986–; divorced)
- Stepsons: Bradley Townsend

Jack Lassiter, played by Alan Hopgood, made his first appearance on 9 April 1986. Hopgood was well known for his role as Wally in Prisoner, by the time he was cast in Neighbours. Jack was introduced as the owner of Lassiter's Hotel and the local pub, The Waterhole, which have been central to storylines throughout the show's history. He departed on 27 June 1986.

On 8 August 2013, it was announced that Hopgood had reprised his role for a month long guest appearance. Hopgood was reunited with co-star Stefan Dennis and he commented "I thoroughly enjoyed returning to the set. In some ways things hadn't changed and others it was very different which made it interesting. It didn't take long at all the settle back in, everyone made me feel very welcome. It was terrific working with Stefan again who is so professional and I also enjoyed working with the new cast." Hopgood regrew his character's moustache for his return. The actor told Lawrence Money from WAtoday that Jack "is wealthy, slightly eccentric and was married off but, several divorces later, he's back and wanting to do something charitable with this money." Jack came back to Erinsborough to "reconcile with his past actions" by giving away some of his fortune. Jack returned on 27 August.

Former gold prospector Jack Lassiter moved to Erinsborough with his wife, Addie, and bought the local hotel, naming it Lassiter's. He also created The Waterhole pub. Jack lived in a caravan by the lake, when Addie died, Jack retreated into himself. Paul Robinson (Dennis) becomes desperate to buy Lassiter's and pays Andrea Townsend (Gina Gaigalas) to try and convince Jack to sell to him. Jack realises what Paul has done and gets his own back by telling Paul that he will sell, only to change his mind a week later. Jack grows close to Andrea, but her son, Bradley (Bradley Kilpatrick), does not like the relationship. When he acts up, Jack smacks Bradley and Andrea throws him out. He later apologises and explains to Bradley that he will not come between him and his mother. Jack tells Andrea about his feelings for her and proposes. Andrea accepts, but confesses to Jack that while she cares for him, she does not love him. Jack does not mind, saying that he will settle for being liked. Jack tells Andrea that he wants to move to the outback, but realising that Andrea is unhappy with the plan, he tells her that they will be going to Paris after the wedding and then they will travel around Europe. While Jack does not feel ready to sell his hotel, he asks Paul to manage it for six months. Jack later contacts the Daniels Corporation from Europe and tells Paul and Rosemary Daniels (Joy Chambers) that he is ready to sell them the hotel.

Jack returns to Erinsborough twenty-seven years later. He goes to Charlie's bar and reminisces about how it used to be called The Waterhole. He then proceeds to Lassiter's Hotel, where he asks Terese Willis (Rebekah Elmaloglou) for his favourite room. Terese gets him the room and then learns that Jack is the man who started the Lassiter's empire. Jack reacquaints himself with Paul again and recognises that he is lonely. Jack acquaints himself with Susan Kennedy (Jackie Woodburne), the principal of the local high school, and helps her to get the radio station up and running again. Jack also helps Josh Willis (Harley Bonner) to organise a series of treasure hunts for the local community, using his money for the prizes. Jack continues to worry about Paul and his lack of friends and family. Jack collapses from a heart attack and Georgia Brooks (Saskia Hampele) saves his life. When Jack returns to Lassiter's, Paul learns that he cannot pay his bill. Jack informs Paul that he has given away all his money as he has an inoperable brain aneurysm. Jack gives Paul the location of the last treasure hunt prize, so he can pay his bill, but Paul pays the bill himself. Jack leaves Erinsborough and dies a few weeks later.

== Charlene Mitchell ==
Charlene Mitchell, played by Kylie Minogue, made her first appearance on 17 April 1986. Minogue was originally signed to appear in Neighbours for one week, but this was then extended to 13 weeks and later through to mid-1988. Minogue thought viewers liked her character as she was portrayed as an average Australian teenager, experiencing a difficult relationship with her mother. Charlene was "a bit of a rebel", outspoken and tomboyish. The character's style often consisted of khaki overalls, baggy sweatshirts and her hair set in a perm. Both Charlene and Minogue became popular with viewers in Australia and Britain. The character had a highly publicised relationship with Scott Robinson (Jason Donovan).

== Nell Mangel ==
Nell Mangel, played by Vivean Gray, made her first appearance on 29 April 1986. The character was originally supposed to appear in Neighbours for three weeks. However, the character proved popular with viewers and she became a permanent member of the cast. The character was rarely addressed by her Christian name and was referred to as Mrs Mangel. Dave Hogan and Neil Wallis described Mrs Mangel as being "frosty and disliked by the residents of Ramsay Street." The character was well known for being an interfering busy body and she developed a rivalry with neighbour, Madge Mitchell (Anne Charleston). A reporter from The Scotsman though Gray made more of an impact in her time on Neighbours than some actors make in their entire careers. They added that Mrs Mangel was "one of the most detestable villains ever to set foot in Ramsay Street."

== Tom Ramsay ==
Tom Ramsay
- Neighbours character
- Portrayed by: Gary Files
- Duration: 1986, 1990–1991, 2015
- First appearance: 12 May 1986
- Last appearance: 18 March 2015
- Introduced by: Reg Watson (1986); Don Battye (1990); Jason Herbison (2015)
In-universe information
- Occupation: Plumber
- Family: Ramsay
- Father: Dan Ramsay
- Mother: Edna Ramsay
- Brothers: Max Ramsay
- Sisters: Madge Bishop
- Wife: Doreen Leicester (backstory)
- Daughters: Gemma Ramsay; Moira Ramsay
- Granddaughters: Holly Harrigan; Roxy Willis
- Nephews: Shane Ramsay; Danny Ramsay; Henry Ramsay
- Nieces: Charlene Robinson
- Other relatives: Daniel Robinson

Tom Ramsay, played by Gary Files, made his first appearance on 12 May 1986. After Francis Bell left his role as Max Ramsay, Files was signed up to play Max's younger brother, Tom, who covered the rest of Max's storylines. Files had one day's notice before he started filming his scenes. There was no time to rewrite the scripts and Tom just moved in with his sister and her children. Files stated: "All we did was cross out Max in the scripts and put in Tom. In places I had to ad lib as I went along." Tom was described as being "a carbon copy" of Max by Josephine Monroe, author of The Neighbours Programme Guide. She quipped that he took over Max's house, business and "evidently also his wardrobe of overalls and dungarees". The author also called him a "blustering fool". A critic for the Reading Evening Post called Tom "a bit of a rough diamond". Tom departed on 4 September 1986, and returned briefly between 6 December 1990 and 1 February 1991. A writer for the BBC's Neighbours website said Tom's most notable moment was "Confronting Matt Robinson after Gemma's motorcycle accident." Files reprised his role for Neighbours' 30th anniversary in March 2015. Tom returns for his great-nephew Daniel Robinson's (Tim Phillipps) wedding and helps solve the mystery of a missing heirloom. A Herald Sun reporter included Tom's 2015 return in their "Neighbours' 30 most memorable moments" feature.

Tom comes to Erinsborough to take over his brother, Max's plumbing business. He moves in with his sister, Madge (Anne Charleston), in Ramsay Street. Madge and Tom constantly argue with each other, especially when Tom announces that he wants to sell Number 24 to a property developer. Tom is set to go ahead with the sale until Madge convinces him that it is the Ramsay family home. Tom recognises Mike Young's (Guy Pearce) potential as a swimmer and begins training him. However, Tom's nephew, Danny (David Clencie), begins to feel left out and asks him to teach him how to play golf. However, Tom concentrates on training Mike and fails to recognise that he is neglecting Danny. Tom begins dating Jean Richards (Margot Knight) and she later introduces him to her husband, Jeff (Paul Young), a quadriplegic who encourages her to be with Tom. When Tom eventually proposes to Jean, she turns him down. Jean is later killed in a car accident, which devastates Tom. Her death is made more painful, as Tom's nephew, Shane (Peter O'Brien) was driving. Tom's mother, Edna (Jessica Noad), comes to visit and she reveals that his estranged daughter, Moira, has given birth to a daughter. Tom, unaware that Moira had been pregnant, is surprised and decides to get in touch with Moira. He later goes to live with Moira in Queensland. He briefly returns to Ramsay Street to visit Madge and his daughter, Gemma (Beth Buchanan). Tom's visit is stressful as Gemma had recently been involved in a motorbike accident and Tom confronts Gemma's boyfriend, Matt Robinson (Ashley Paske), the owner of the bike. Tom returns to Queensland soon after.

Twenty-four years later, Tom returns to Erinsborough for his great-nephew Daniel's wedding to Amber Turner (Jenna Rosenow). He comes across Imogen Willis (Ariel Kaplan) looking at a picture of Agnes Robinson, and tells her how everyone tried to find her engagement ring after she threw it down a well. Tom then goes to see Daniel. He leaves after the wedding is cancelled.

== Debra Fleming ==
Debra Fleming
- Neighbours character
- Portrayed by: Charm Lee
- First appearance: 14 May 1986
- Last appearance: 7 July 1986
- Introduced by: Reg Watson
In-universe information
- Occupation: Businesswoman
- Father: Lewis Fleming

Debra Fleming, played by Charm Lee, made her first appearance on 14 May 1986. That same month, Stephen Cook of TV Week reported on the introduction of Lee and Nick Waters as "nasties" Debra Fleming and Fred Mitchell respectively. Lee said she had not appeared on television for a while, so she was grateful for the exposure Neighbours would bring her. She felt she could do her character justice and had to really think about what led her to act as "tough and cold as she does." Cook nicknamed Lee's character "dastardly Debra", and described her as a young businesswoman with "a lust for power" who would "rock the boat" upon her arrival in Ramsay Street. Cook also called her "a very aggressive, sophisticated type." Lee told him that Debra was very strong and quite unlike the serial's other characters, who she thought were nice and honest. She said Debra was really complex and not two-dimensional, telling Cook "There's not a lot of roles that are meaty like this one." Debra is from a wealthy family and becomes involved with Paul Robinson (Stefan Dennis) during her time in the show. Lee explained "She also likes her men – wines and dines a couple of them, but on her terms, of course!"

Debra is immediately attracted to her driver Shane Ramsay (Peter O'Brien) when he collects her from the airport and she flirts with him, as he drives her to Erinsborough. After Shane shows her to her room, she invites him in for a drink and they have sex. Debra then asks Shane to take her to Wodonga for a meeting. They return the following day and Shane's business partner Helen Daniels (Anne Haddy) sees him kissing Debra, so she takes over chauffeuring Debra and her father Lewis Fleming (Clive Hearne). Debra and Lewis start doing business with Paul Robinson and Debra develops an attraction towards him. She takes Paul out to dinner to apologise for a misunderstanding in which she and Lewis thought Paul had been working with Helen to con them out of a deal. Shane turns up in the middle of the meal and Debra makes it clear that she used him and was no longer interested in him. Debra continues to pursue Paul and visits his younger sister Lucy Robinson (Kylie Flinker) in the hospital, which helps her gain Paul's trust. She asks if she can share his office, while she is in town doing business for her father, and Paul agrees. Debra later calls her father to tell him that they will soon be in a position to beat the Daniels Corporation to the sale of Lassiter's Hotel. She also employs a member of her father's staff, Margaret Owens (Melinda Frith), as a temporary secretary when Zoe Davis (Ally Fowler) takes some leave. Margaret helps Debra by stealing the keys to the filing cabinet and getting an extra one cut. Debra continues to feign romantic interest in Paul, who soon realises there is a spy in the office when Jack Lassiter (Alan Hopgood) tells him another company made an offer on the hotel, which was 1% higher than the Daniels Corporation's offer. Paul suspects Debra and Margaret, so he hires a private detective to check on everyone in the office. He also sets up a fake deal and mentions the company to catch Debra out. At the same time, Debra gets Shane fired from his landscaping job at the hotel by poaching his labourers, leaving the site unattended. When Mrs Mangel (Vivean Gray) is injured, she threatens to sue, so Paul fires Shane. Shane realises that Debra was behind his firing and gets his labourers to tell him which company paid them to leave. He tells Paul that Debra set him up and Paul rehires him. Paul learns Debra is the spy in the office when she undercuts him on a deal with the Henley Corporation, so he asks her to leave Debra tells him that their time together meant a lot to her, but Paul warns her not to come back.

== Sue Parker ==
Sue Parker
- Neighbours character
- Portrayed by: Kate Gorman
- Duration: 1986–1987, 2014–2015, 2018, 2023, 2025
- First appearance: 9 June 1986
- Last appearance: 11 December 2025
- Introduced by: Reg Watson (1986); Jason Herbison (2014)
In-universe information
- Occupation: Student; Bank teller; Councillor
- Father: Bill Parker
- Husband: Bill Warley
- Sons: Jayden Warley

Sue Parker, played by Kate Gorman, made her first appearance on 9 June 1986. Gorman appeared on Neighbours for two years. In their book, The Neighbours Factfile, Neil Wallis and Dave Hogan, describe Sue as being "bitchy". A notable storyline for the character saw her play "a cruel practical joke" on Mike Young (Guy Pearce) and Scott Robinson (Jason Donovan). Sue never got over Mike preferring Jane Harris (Annie Jones) to her and vowed to get even. When Sue heard that Mike and Scott had written a song and sent it to Molly Meldrum, she called them up, pretending to be Molly's secretary, and invited them to come and sing the song in front of Molly. Mike and Scott soon discovered it was a hoax and Sue publicly gloated about what happened. Gorman returned as Sue in July 2014. Michael Cregan from Inside Soap commented "This is the best and most unexpected soap return ever!"

In 2017, Johnathon Hughes of Digital Spy included Sue in his "7 of the most evil mean girls in soap" list. Of the character, Hughes stated "In the '80s, surly Sue and her daggy side-parting was a total bullying beeyach to Charlene (she tried to split up her and Scott, which is completely unforgivable) and her best mate Jane Harris (or "Plain Jane Superbrain" to give the girl her full title). In one memorable scene, mousy Jane finally thumped her and we all cheered." Gorman returned to filming in late 2017, and made her on-screen return as Sue on 7 February 2018. Gorman reprised the role again in 2025 and made sporadic appearances towards the show's final episodes.

Sue spreads malicious rumours about Nikki Dennison (Charlene Fenn) and develops a crush on Mike Young. Sue is not happy when Mike begins dating Jane Harris and she sends poison pen letters about Mike to Nell Mangel (Vivean Gray), hoping that she will stop Jane from seeing Mike, but Daphne Lawrence (Elaine Smith) catches her. Jane later punches Sue and her friends cover for her. Sue tells her father, Bill (Mark Allen) that it was a gang attack and he threatens to sue all four parties involved. However, Jane owns up to punching Sue and explains about the letters. Sue admits to exaggerating her story and her father backs down. Sue remains bitter about Mike choosing Jane over her and she decides to play a joke on him and Scott Robinson. Sue pretends to be Molly Meldrum's, secretary and tells Mike and Scott that Molly heard the demo they sent in and wants to see them in person. The joke backfires on Sue when Molly meets with Mike and Scott and praises their song.

Sue causes Scott and Charlene Mitchell's (Kylie Minogue) break up, when she tells Scott that Charlene and Warren Murphy (Ben Mendelsohn) kissed. When Sue overhears Scott has written some formulas on his arms to cheat in an exam, she tells Mr White (Douglas Bennett), who confronts Scott. But Scott has already washed off the writing, leaving Sue looking like a liar. After they leave school, Sue become a trainee at the local bank. She runs into Scott and apologises for being rough on him at school. Sue dates Charlene's brother, Henry Ramsay (Craig McLachlan), which upsets Charlene. Sue tries to prove to her that she has changed. She later moves into a caravan with Charlene, but the pair do not get along. When Henry is arrested for robbery, Sue offers to give him a false alibi. Warren warns Sue not to lie for Henry, explaining that she could lose her job, and she agrees not to. Sue begins staying at Warren's place, and when the caravan burns down, she continues to stay there, which annoys Henry. He asks Sue to move in with him, threatening to break up with her if she does not. Sue refuses and leaves with Warren.

Twenty-seven years later, Sue comes into regular contact with Scott's brother Paul (Stefan Dennis) through her job as an Erinsborough councillor. When Sue's son, Jayden (Khan Oxenham), buys a skateboard from Josh Willis (Harley Bonner), and then injures himself trying to recreate a stunt he had seen Josh performing, Sue threatens to sue Josh. Scott and Charlene's son, Daniel Robinson (Tim Phillipps) speaks to Sue and reminds her of the poison pen letters she sent and the rest of the bad things she did when she was a teenager. Sue agrees to drop the case. When Paul is suspended from his job as mayor, Sue is voted in as interim mayor. When Paul arranges an event at the local plant nursery, to announce that he is ready to take up his job again, the nursery is trashed by Jayden. Paul forces a confession out of him and when Sue learns what her son did, she steps down as interim mayor, so Paul will not press charges against Jayden. Sue later berates Paul for using community service workers to clear out The Waterhole's office. When Sue's husband Bill Warley (Darren Mort) sees an old photo of Sue and Paul kissing, he realises that she had an affair while they were dating and he punches Paul. Sue and Paul reminisce about that day, and Sue apologises for Bill's actions.

When Paul starts missing council meetings, Sue becomes suspicious and visits his penthouse to find out what is going on. Sue suggests that Paul is no longer up to the job and he tells her to leave. She spots some anti-nausea pills on her way out and tries to find out more information from Karl Kennedy (Alan Fletcher). Paul then calls a council meeting and announces that he has leukaemia. Weeks later, Sue attends a friend's birthday party and propositions Josh after watching his dance routine. Josh declines her offer. Naomi Canning (Morgana O'Reilly) applies for an events job with the council, but Sue refuses to consider her application as she is in a relationship with Paul. Naomi learns about Josh and blackmails Sue, who lets her organise the launch party for the new childcare centre. Sue sabotages Susan Kennedy (Jackie Woodburne) and Brad Willis' (Kip Gamblin) chances of saving Erinsborough High from closure. She is later fired from her job when it emerges she accepted a bribe from Paul to get his housing estate plans approved quickly.

Three years later, Sue learns Paul is taking over a half-finished housing development. She tells him that the original owners of the development underpaid the mostly elderly home owners who were already there. Sue points out that if that information becomes public knowledge, then Paul's housing development will be tainted. She agrees to keep quiet, but only if Paul gives Jayden a job on the development. Paul gets his daughter Amy Williams (Zoe Cramond) to hire Jayden at her builders yard. The truth about the home owners being underpaid is leaked to the press, and Paul assumes Sue is responsible, but she denies it. Rafael Humphreys (Ryan Thomas) overhears Sue talking about Paul, and they team up to discredit Paul's reputation and the housing development. Sue asks Jayden to loosen the ratchet straps on a truck carrying concrete slabs, so they will fall off. Leo Tanaka (Tim Kano) is injured by the falling slabs, and Sue and Jayden's involvement in the accident is revealed. They receive a six-month prison sentence each.

Five years later, Sue participates in a protest to stop the closure of the school. However, she later contacts Terese Willis (Rebekah Elmaloglou), who has bought the school's land, and asks her if she needs any help in quarrels against the council. Two years later, Sue loses her bid to become Erinsborough's Seniors' Advisor to Karl after Jane brings up her criminal history. Sue then ridicules Jane's many failed relationships with Paul, Des Clarke (Paul Keane), Clive Gibbons (Geoff Paine), Mike, Victor Stone (Craig Hall) and Clint Hendry (Jason Wilder).

== Jane Harris ==
Jane Harris, played by Annie Jones, made her first appearance on 31 July 1986. Jones spent two months ringing the Neighbours production company asking for a role on the show. She said "I had appeared on several other Australian TV shows, but desperately wanted to get into Neighbours". Jones originally auditioned for the role of Charlene Mitchell, before she was given the small role of Jane, for what was a planned six weeks of appearances. Jane was Nell Mangel's (Vivean Gray) granddaughter. She was very clever and was often bullied at school. The character received the nickname of "Plain Jane Superbrain". For her portrayal of Jane, Jones won the 1989 Most Popular Actress Logie Award.

== Sam Cole ==
Sam Cole
- Neighbours character
- Portrayed by: Scott Wealands (1986); Thomas Hamston (1986–1987)
- Duration: 1986–1987
- First appearance: 31 July 1986
- Last appearance: 28 January 1987
- Introduced by: Reg Watson
In-universe information
- Other names: Frederick Samuel Cole
- Father: Fred Mitchell
- Mother: Susan Cole
- Half-brothers: Henry Ramsay
- Half-sisters: Charlene Robinson

Sam Cole made his first appearance on 31 July 1986. Sam was originally played by Scott Wealands until the role was taken over by Thomas Hamston. Sam became the second baby to appear in Neighbours.

Susan Cole (Gloria Ajenstat) gives birth to Sam while she is having an affair with Fred Mitchell (Nick Waters), her boss and a married man. When Fred throws Susan and Sam out, Susan goes to Erinsborough. Susan contacts Sam's half-sister, Charlene Mitchell (Kylie Minogue) when she falls ill and Charlene takes Sam home with her. Charlene tells her mother, Madge (Anne Charleston), that Sam is her child and Madge begins to bond with him. Susan eventually comes to collect Sam, but she collapses and Madge lets her and Sam stay for a while. Susan and Sam later move in with Clive Gibbons (Geoff Paine). Clive bonds with Sam and enjoys having him in his life. Susan begins an affair with Paul Robinson (Stefan Dennis). When he ends their affair, Susan realises how much Clive loves her and Sam and they begin dating.

When Clive proposes to Susan in the street, she lets go of Sam's pram to take the ring. The pram rolls down the street and into the road. An oncoming car containing Paul, Scott Robinson (Jason Donovan) and Mike Young (Guy Pearce) has to swerve to avoid hitting Sam and he is recovered by Susan. Susan agrees to marry Clive as she believes that he will be a better father to Sam than Paul. Susan realises that she does not love Clive and she and Sam leave. A few days later, Susan tells Charlene that she has left Sam's favourite teddy bear at Clive's house and asks her to collect it for him. Clive comes to see Susan and she leaves Sam with him, while she says goodbye to Paul. Clive tells Sam to eat his pumpkin and to enjoy life. Susan and Sam then leave for Coffs Harbour.

== Susan Cole ==
Susan Cole
- Neighbours character
- Portrayed by: Gloria Ajenstat
- Duration: 1986–1987
- First appearance: 11 August 1986
- Last appearance: 28 January 1987
- Introduced by: Reg Watson
In-universe information
- Occupation: Secretary
- Father: Cappy Cole
- Mother: Merle Cole
- Brothers: Kevin Cole; Bob Cole
- Sons: Sam Cole

Susan Cole, played by Gloria Ajenstat, made her first appearance on 11 August 1986. During her time in the show, Susan moved onto Ramsay Street and developed a romance with Clive Gibbons (Geoff Paine). In November 1986, Stephen Cook from TV Week reported that Ajenstat would be leaving Neighbours early the following year. Neighbours producer Phil East explained that Ajenstat was simply leaving when her contract came up for renewal. A writer for the BBC's Neighbours website said Susan's most notable moment was "Chasing her son's pram down a hill just as it went into the path of Paul Robinson's car – causing it to crash." Fergus Shiel from The Sydney Morning Herald branded Susan "sultry."

Susan has an affair with Fred Mitchell (Nick Waters), while she works for him and his wife, Madge (Anne Charleston), at their hardware shop. When Madge catches them together, she leaves Fred. Susan and Fred's relationship becomes strained after Susan discovers she is pregnant. She gives birth to a son, who she names Frederick Samuel "Sam" Cole (Scott Wealands; Thomas Hamston). Fred does not want the responsibility of another child and ends the relationship with Susan.

Susan comes to Erinsborough to see Fred's daughter, Charlene (Kylie Minogue), who she is quite close to. Susan gets an infection and has to be hospitalised, so she calls Charlene for help. Charlene takes Sam home with her and lies to Madge that he is her son. Madge eventually accepts Sam as her grandson, but she is shocked when Susan arrives in Ramsay Street for him. An argument breaks out and Susan collapses in Madge's living room. Madge agrees to let her stay the night, but after learning that Fred had left Susan and Sam, she lets them stay with her until Susan recovers from her illness. Clive Gibbons offers Susan a room at his house and she accepts, she also gets a job as Paul Robinson's (Stefan Dennis) secretary. Susan and Paul begin an affair, which upsets Clive as he had fallen in love with Susan. Susan agrees to pose as Clive's wife when his uncle comes to stay, so Clive can appear as a happily married man. The plan fails when Clive's uncle sees Susan kissing Paul. After Paul and Susan's relationship ends, she realises that Clive loves her and she starts dating him. When she is out walking Sam one day, Clive proposes to a shocked Susan. Susan agrees to marry him, but she lets go of Sam's pram to take the ring and it rolls down the street and into the path of the traffic. Paul, Scott Robinson (Jason Donovan) and Mike Young (Guy Pearce) have to swerve their car to avoid hitting Sam, who is recovered by Susan. Susan realises that she does not love Clive and that she is only marrying him for security. She decides to leave him before they marry and leaves Clive a note apologising for leaving. Susan gets in touch with Charlene to ask her to get Sam's favourite teddy, which she had left behind. Clive catches Charlene and begs her to let him know where Susan is. Charlene arranges a meeting between him and Susan, and Susan apologises for leaving him. She then flies home to Coffs Harbour.

== Dan Ramsay ==
Dan Ramsay
- Neighbours character
- Portrayed by: Syd Conabere
- Duration: 1986–1988
- First appearance: 26 August 1986
- Last appearance: 20 July 1988
- Introduced by: Reg Watson (1986); Don Battye (1988)
In-universe information
- Occupation: Retired
- Family: Ramsay
- Father: Jack Ramsay
- Sisters: Maud Ramsay
- Wife: Edna Ramsay (1986–)
- Sons: Max Ramsay; Tom Ramsay
- Daughters: Madge Bishop
- Grandsons: Shane Ramsay; Henry Ramsay
- Granddaughters: Charlene Robinson
- Uncles: Fred Ramsay
- First cousins: Roger Adair

Dan Ramsay, played by Syd Conabere, made his first appearance on 26 August 1986. The character arrived in Erinsborough after being thrown out by his wife, Edna (Jessica Noad). Josephine Monroe, author of The Neighbours Programme Guide, quipped that it was apparent where Dan's sons Max (Francis Bell) and Tom (Gary Files) got their "pig-headedness" from and thought he was worse than both of them put together. When Edna found out that she and Dan were not legally married, Monroe thought it was due to Dan's "typical incompetence". Dan and Edna, who were on the brink of separating for good, were eventually married and they headed back to Brisbane. A writer for the BBC's Neighbours website said Dan's most notable moment was "Marrying his wife of 50 years after their original marriage was shown to be invalid!" In her book, Neighbours: the first 10 years, Josephine Monroe said Dan and Edna's wedding was one of the "most moving" and simplest ceremonies.

Dan was born in Erinsborough, but he moved to Brisbane to find work. He met and married Edna Wilkins and they had three children; Max, Tom and Madge (Anne Charleston). Dan was happy when Madge began dating Harold Bishop (Ian Smith), but he was left shocked when she married Fred Mitchell (Nick Waters) and moved to Coff's Harbour. After the marriage ends, Madge moves to Ramsay Street, which had been named after Dan's father, Jack. Dan soon follows Madge after Edna throws him out for flirting with another woman. Dan takes an instant dislike to Clive Gibbons (Geoff Paine) after he almost drives over Dan's suitcase. Dan fakes a heart scare and Clive mentions he is a doctor, which prompts Dan to recover quickly. Dan makes sure that all the neighbours know about his family's history and he clashes with the Robinson family. Dan's granddaughter, Charlene (Kylie Minogue), is thrilled that he is staying, but Tom is not and he refuses to let his father stay with him. However, Dan insists on staying. He later harasses Madge at The Waterhole for free drinks, but refuses to tell her why he had left Edna on her own. Tom discovers that Edna is staying with Max and Madge invites her to Erinsborough. Edna is not happy to see Dan and they barely tolerate each other. Dan tries to wind Edna up by talking about a date he had arranged with Helen Daniels (Anne Haddy). Tom and Dan start to heal their rift by shaking hands.

Dan goes to dinner with Helen, but is unaware that she, Madge and Clive had come up with a plan to reunite him with Edna. Helen pretends to be rude and disagreeable, but Dan finds Helen even more attractive. Dan takes Helen to his home and Edna appears and asks for a divorce. Clive tells Dan that he is taking Edna on a date, which makes Dan jealous. Edna discovers that their marriage was never legal because Dan had got a cheap minister, who was actually a con artist, to marry them. Dan is shocked by the revelation and Edna accuses Dan of causing her to live in sin for years. They talk about their lives, but when Edna asks for a second chance, Dan tells her that it is too late for them to start over. Clive, Charlene, Madge and Shane (Peter O'Brien) hatch a plan to get Dan and Edna together again. They make the couple nostalgic for the old days and Dan asks Edna to marry him. Dan and Edna get married in a small private ceremony in front of Madge, Charlene, Clive and Shane. Dan then takes Edna to Surfer's Paradise for their honeymoon. Dan continues to cause rows with the Robinson family when he comes to visit Ramsay Street. Scott Robinson (Jason Donovan) discovers that Ramsay Street should have been named after the Robinsons, which disgusts Dan. Dan's ire is further provoked when Todd (Kristian Schmid) and Katie Landers (Sally Jensen) change the street sign to Robinson Street. He then organises a card game between Scott and Henry Ramsay (Craig McLachlan) and asks Charlene to fix the cards, so that Henry will win. Henry wins, even after Scott asks for the cards to be checked. Dan later suffers a heart attack in Brisbane and he is forced to miss Madge's wedding to Harold. A few months later, he offers a house to Charlene and Scott in Brisbane and they later name their son, Daniel, after him.

== Ruth Wilson ==
Ruth Wilson
- Neighbours character
- Portrayed by: Stephanie Daniel
- First appearance: 1 September 1986
- Last appearance: 4 November 1986
- Introduced by: Reg Watson
In-universe information
- Husband: Philip (deceased)
- Sons: Simon
- Daughters: Diane

Ruth Wilson, played by Stephanie Daniel, made her first appearance on 1 September 1986. Ruth was an Englishwoman who was introduced as a love interest for widower Jim Robinson (Alan Dale). Ruth and Jim "got on like a house on fire" and when she suffered money troubles, Jim invited Ruth to come and stay with him and his family. Josephine Monroe, author of The Neighbours Programme Guide, believed Ruth was just another in "a long line of Ramsay Street swindlers".

While he is flying home from a business trip, Jim Robinson falls asleep on Ruth's shoulder. He and Ruth begin to talk and he learns that she is going to stay in Erinsborough. Ruth accepts when Jim asks her out to dinner. When Jim comes to pick Ruth up, he discovers that she is not able to pay her hotel bill. Ruth finds out that her London accountant has stolen her money, leaving her penniless. She also realises that she will be unable to return to her two children back in England. Jim's son, Paul (Stefan Dennis), refuses to help Ruth out, so Jim pays Ruth's bill and asks her to stay with him. Ruth is grateful to Jim and assures him that she will pay him back. Ruth befriends Jim's daughter, Lucy (Kylie Flinker), and his mother-in-law, Helen (Anne Haddy), but worries that she is outstaying her welcome. Ruth decides to sell a ring in order to pay Jim back, but he refuses to take the money. Jim then insists that she can stay as long as she needs to. Helen begins to resent having Ruth around after Ruth discovers that Lucy is faking an illness to get out of going to school. However, she admits that she is glad Jim has found someone who makes him happy.

Ruth gets a bank loan, but does not tell Jim straight away. She later confesses that she was stalling because she did not want to leave him and his family. Ruth makes plans to return home, but Jim asks her to stay and they kiss. Ruth then decides to move back to Lassiter's, so the family can get used to their relationship. After a family dinner, Ruth is invited to move back in. She is flattered when Ted Gibbons (Max Meldrum) pays her some attention and when he reveals that he is going to visit England, Ruth suggests that they meet up. Jim admits that he does not love Ruth, but that he cares for her. Ruth tells Jim that she wants to return home in time for Christmas, but this upsets Lucy. After Lucy is recovered from a storm drain, she suffers from hysterical blindness and Ruth agrees to stay and look after her. Ruth explains that she will leave once Lucy's sight returns, but Paul is adamant that Ruth needs to leave. Ruth then decides to leave the following morning, which devastates Lucy, so she agrees to delay her flight. Lucy's sight returns and though she initially tries to keep it a secret, she tells Ruth, who organises a flight home. Ruth gives Lucy her jewellery box and Lucy gives Ruth her favourite book. Ruth thanks Jim for everything and she leaves.

== Edna Ramsay ==
Edna Ramsay
- Neighbours character
- Portrayed by: Jessica Noad
- Duration: 1986–1988
- First appearance: 2 September 1986
- Last appearance: 12 May 1988
- Introduced by: Reg Watson (1986); Don Battye (1988)
In-universe information
- Other names: Edna Wilkins
- Occupation: Retired
- Family: Ramsay
- Husband: Dan Ramsay (1986–)
- Sons: Max Ramsay; Tom Ramsay
- Daughters: Madge Bishop
- Grandsons: Shane Ramsay; Henry Ramsay
- Granddaughters: Charlene Robinson; Gemma Ramsay; Moira Ramsay

Edna Ramsay, played by Jessica Noad (1915–2002), made her first appearance on 2 September 1986. Edna follows her husband Dan (Syd Conabere) to Erinsborough, after she kicks him out for flirting with another woman. Edna was very concerned with what the neighbours thought and was embarrassed by Dan. A BBC writer described Edna as having "the patience of a saint" and being generous, they added that she had a "quiet strength." When Edna learned that she and Dan were not legally married, she was "distraught" at having lived in sin for nearly fifty years. Dan tried to make things up to Edna and the couple were married, before leaving for Brisbane. A writer for the BBC's Neighbours website said Edna's most notable moment was "Getting married after 50 years with her partner Dan." In her book, Neighbours: the first 10 years, Josephine Monroe said Dan and Edna's wedding was one of the "most moving" and simplest ceremonies.

Edna met Dan Ramsay at a dance, shortly after she left school. They married and had three children; Max (Francis Bell), Tom (Gary Files) and Madge (Anne Charleston). Edna was proud of Madge for dating Harold Bishop (Ian Smith), as she adored him. However, Edna was shocked when Madge then married Fred Mitchell (Nick Waters). Edna had feared the marriage would end in divorce and she was proven right a few years later. When Edna caught Dan flirting with another woman she threw him out and he went to stay with Madge and Tom in Erinsborough. Tom contacts Max and he reveals that Edna is staying with him. Madge then invites her mother to Erinsborough and tells her that Dan had gone. Edna is not happy when she finds Dan is still in town and Edna orders her daughter to decide who she wants to stay. Madge refuses to choose and Edna and Dan agree to tolerate each other. Dan tries to wind Edna up when he reveals that he has a date with Helen Daniels (Anne Haddy). Edna ignores him and tells Tom about his new granddaughter instead. Dan brings Helen home and Edna calls her a jezebel, before asking Dan for a divorce.

Edna takes up aerobics and tells Madge that she is going to enjoy her life without Dan. Clive Gibbons (Geoff Paine) suggests that Edna make Dan jealous by taking a man to dinner. Edna chooses to take Clive, which makes Dan furious. Edna has a good time with Clive and she tells him about how things changed between her and Dan. Edna goes to see a divorce lawyer and is shocked when she learns that her marriage had never been legal. Dan refuses to accept any blame, when Edna tells him that it was his fault. Edna accuses him of causing her to live in sin, but asks what they should do next. Dan and Edna talk about old times and when Edna suggests they give their marriage another go, Dan dismisses her. Clive comes up with a plan to reunite Dan and Edna, but making them nostalgic for the old days. Dan asks Edna to marry him and she agrees. Dan and Edna get married in a small private ceremony and go to Surfer's Paradise for their honeymoon. Edna is delighted when Madge finally agrees to marry Harold and just before the wedding, she takes him aside and gives him a warning to take care of her daughter. She then watches Madge and Harold marry.

== Warren Murphy ==
Warren Murphy
- Neighbours character
- Portrayed by: Ben Mendelsohn
- Duration: 1986–1987
- First appearance: 13 October 1986
- Last appearance: 22 May 1987
- Introduced by: Reg Watson
In-universe information
- Occupation: Student
- Father: Ray Murphy
- Mother: Faye Murphy
- Sisters: Jodie Murphy

Warren Murphy, played by Ben Mendelsohn, made his first appearance on 13 October 1986. Mendelsohn won the role of Warren when he was seventeen. He commented "I only did Neighbours for 6 weeks – it was actually, The Year My Voice Broke, and then I did 6 weeks on Neighbours, such is the life of the odd actor trying to make a buck." Mendelsohn befriended Kylie Minogue and Jason Donovan, who had become very popular with viewers, and he described the attention they received as "hectic". Mendelsohn told The Guardian's Alex Godfrey that he did not want that level of fame, saying "I felt like a participant plenty enough. Within the circle of people I was working with, I was fairly well regarded, in my own way. So no, it was fun and silly, but I didn't look on with shades of green." In March 2015, Mendelsohn admitted that he would have liked to have returned to Neighbours for its 30th anniversary, but he was not asked. He said that he was "really proud" of his time on the show, adding "I would have been thrilled to have gone back but I don't think I was asked. But to be fair, I only did about a six-week stint, if I had done a year maybe I would have said 'how bout it, can we have Warren again?'."

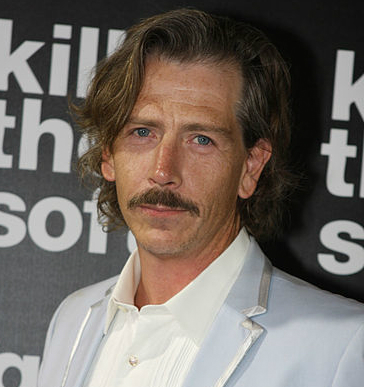
Ben Mendelsohn portrayed Warren from 1986 to 1987.

Warren begins studying for his HSC with Charlene Mitchell (Minogue) and Scott Robinson (Donovan). Warren struggles to get through a study session without drinking a bottle of wine, which does not impress Scott, but Charlene joins in. Warren's father, Ray Murphy (Norman Yemm), advises him to cut down, but does not appear too concerned. Warren spends the night at his father's house and he admits that his mother is not happy about it. Warren also admits that he finds it difficult being caught between his parents. Ray tells Warren not to worry and gives him some money, which Warren spends on wine. A fellow student throws a party, which Warren and Charlene attend together. Sue Parker (Kate Gorman) notices Warren's alcohol problem and she also calls Scott to tell him that Charlene and Warren kissed, causing them to break up.

The following day, Charlene has trouble remembering what happened and is surprised when Ray turns up and reveals Warren is unconscious after being beaten up. At the hospital, Charlene admits to the police that cannot remember the night before, which angers Ray. He learns that Warren and Charlene went to another party and almost gets physical with Charlene, until Charlene's cousin, Shane Ramsay (Peter O'Brien) intervenes. Warren wakes up and explains that while he and Charlene were at a party on Waratah Street, some guys began hassling Charlene and he told them to back off, which they did not like. After Warren took Charlene home, the guys attacked him. Warren points out that the situation is not Charlene's fault, but Ray throws her out of the hospital. When Ray collects Warren from the hospital, Warren tells him that he drinks to help him cope with his parents' divorce and the upcoming exams. Ray does not initially take his son seriously, but Warren confesses that he needs to have a few drinks just to get through the day. Both Warren and Ray vow to give up alcohol completely. When Warren learns that Sue has offered to give her boyfriend, Henry Ramsay (Craig McLachlan), a false alibi, following his arrest for robbery, he warns her not to. He explains that she could lose her job and Sue changes her mind. Sue begins staying at Warren's place and he develops feelings for her. When Sue refuses to move in with Henry, they break up and Sue leaves with Warren.

== Others ==
Date(s)	Character	Actor	Circumstances
20 January	Removal Man	Charles Gilroy	Shortly after the Removal Man drives into Ramsay Street with his colleague, he is immediately approached by Max Ramsay. Max tries to ask about the new owners of Number 22, but the Removal Man is more interested in the latest gossip surrounding the street.
23–24 January	Lee Adams	Kathy Gordon	While Paul Robinson is recovering from a gunshot wound in the hospital, he meets nurse Lee and asks her for her phone number. Lee accepts a date with Paul after he is discharged. At the restaurant, Paul is rude and makes it clear that he just wants to have sex with Lee, so she walks out on him.
24–27 January	Carol Naylor	Jayne Healey	After Lee Adams walks out on Paul Robinson during their date, escort Carol approaches him and he pays her to spend the night with him. Carol surprises Paul's father Jim Robinson and grandmother Helen Daniels when she appears at the breakfast table, while looking for the bathroom. Paul tells her to go get dressed, so he can drive her home. Carol tells Jim and Helen that she never would have come back with Paul if she knew he did not live alone. They continue fighting outside, as Carol tells Paul that has no right to treat her badly.
28 January–17 February	Burt Rawlings	Neil Thompson	A private detective hired by Helen Daniels to track down con-artist Douglas Blake. After informing Helen of Douglas' whereabouts, he approaches Douglas himself in an attempt to extort money from him.
31 January	Hold Up Man	Geoffrey Graham	As Shane Ramsay is driving Daphne Lawrence and her bridal party, Max Ramsay and Zoe Davis, to her wedding, he spots a man in a gorilla costume and tells him to get in the car, assuming that it is his brother Danny. The man pulls out a gun and tells Shane to start driving. When they reach a deserted back road, the man orders everyone out of the car and drives off.
3 February	Sergeant Harris	Eric McPhan	Sergeant Harris hears the story of how a man in a gorilla suit hijacked Shane Ramsay's car and pays a visit to the Ramsays. He asks Shane's father Max Ramsay if his other son Danny owns a gorilla suit, before informing him that Danny is at the station with their neighbour Clive Gibbons.
7 February	Marcie	Erif Perkins	An employee of the Pacific Bank, who Danny Ramsay spends weeks trying to impress. Marcie wishes to visit Surfers Paradise, so Danny attempts to make enough money for the trip. When he proposes a trip to the mountains instead, she is unimpressed and reveals she is visiting Fiji with someone else.
10 February	Bill Worth	Laurie Dobson	A Detective Sergeant who investigates Scott Robinson's disappearance. He asks Jim Robinson and Helen Daniels for details about Scott. He returns with Scott's wallet after a body is found, and requests that Jim identify the body.
10 February	Les Lannigan	Peter Schofield	While Zoe Davis is looking after the Coffee Shop, she hires Les or "Lambchop" as a temporary cook. Les is noisy in the kitchen and his food is poor. He walks out before Zoe can fire him, and Paul Robinson believes he has stolen from the kitchen.
11–28 February	Beth Travers	Virginia Hey	Beth hires Clive Gibbons and Shane Ramsay's gardening service. Beth and Shane go on a date and Beth begins giving Shane lots of gifts. Shane tries to break up with her and Clive tells Beth that Shane is engaged. When she delivers a wedding gift to Shane's house, his father tells her she has been lied to. Beth tries to continue her relationship with Shane, but he makes it clear that he does not want to date her. When Shane is moving some things into the cellar, Beth locks him in. She tells him that if she can not have him, nobody could. When Beth brings Shane food, he tries to escape, but she shuts the door and locks them both in. Beth apologises and confesses that she has been lonely since her husband left. She gives Shane the key to the door and he leaves.
12 February	Michelle	Dianne Mitchell	Michelle is a nurse at St. Agnes Memorial Hospital. She attends to Scott Robinson, who has been injured in a mugging, and asks him to give her his real name, so she can contact his parents. Kelly, a young patient, visits Scott's room and Michelle allows her to stay. Kelly gets Scott to tell her his real name, and she explains that she lives in an orphanage. When Scott tells her that he does not want to go back to his family, Kelly replies that he must be out of his mind, as she would be happy to have a family and a home. Kelly and Michelle encourage Scott to call his father, so he can collect Scott from the hospital.
12 February	Kelly	Tamsin West	
18 February–13 June 1989	Barbara Young	Rona McLeod; Diana Greentree	Mike Young's mother and the wife of David Young. Barbara comes to the Coffee Shop to tell Daphne Lawrence that it is wrong to keep Mike from his parents. She later asks Mike to return home, but he refuses due to his father's violent moods. Barbara cuts off contact with Mike, but later sends him cheques to help pay for his board. David dies and Barbara asks Mike to return home. She later leaves for a trip around the world. Barbara cuts her holiday short when she runs out of money and she then tries to get Mike's trust fund but is enraged to find Mike has used it to fund Jenny Owens' medical expenses. Barbara then leaves to stay with her sister. Months later, Barbara is injured in a plane crash and Mike goes to care for her.
18–19 February	David Young	Stewart Faichney	Mike Young's father. He is often violent towards his son and his wife, Barbara. When Mike tries to stand up to David, they end up fighting. Mike pushes his father to the ground and thinking he had killed him, leaves home. David and Barbara come to see Mike the following day, but he refuses to come back home. David later dies from a heart attack and leaves Barbara a great sum of money.
3 March	Heather Ambrose	Judith Graham	During her search for her biological mother, Rosemary Daniels visits Heather, thinking she is a friend of the family. Heather initially tells Rosemary that her mother is dead, but Rosemary works out that she is lying. Heather then explains that she is her mother and was forced to give her up by her family. Heather explains that while she had loved her daughter, she did not want the past dragged up anymore.
4–6 March	Sue Wright	Gael Ballantyne	Paul Robinson hires Sue as the new secretary at the Daniels Corporation. Sue is late on her second day, earning a reprimand from Paul. Sue tells Paul that she does not like his attitude and quits.
7 March–27 June	Andrea Townsend	Gina Gaigalas	When Andrea and her son, Bradley, suddenly arrive in Erinsborough, Andrea calls former boyfriend, Des Clarke to tell him he is Bradley's father. Andrea and Bradley stay with Des. Bradley befriends Lucy Robinson and offends many of the neighbours. When Des's mother, Eileen, arrives, she clashes with Andrea and does not believe that Bradley is Des's son. Eileen finds Bradley's birth certificate, but Bradley steals it from her. However, Eileen reveals Andrea is lying about Bradley's age and traces his real father, Gavin McKinley. Gavin turns up in Ramsay Street and tries to kidnap Bradley. Andrea reveals that Gavin offered her $15,000 for custody of Bradley and she accepted. But she later took Bradley from his school and fled to Erinsborough. Andrea develops a close friendship with Jack Lassiter. Bradley acts up to put Jack off his mother, causing Jack to smack him one night. Jack proposes to Andrea, who accepts despite not being in love with him. Bradley gives them his blessing and he even proposes to Lucy. Jack sells his hotel and tells Andrea and Bradley that he is taking them to Europe after the wedding. Bradley is initially against the idea, but Lucy convinces him to go and the family depart.
7 March–27 June	Bradley Townsend	Bradley Kilpatrick	
3 April	Miss Davidson	Carmel Millhouse	The headmistress of Nikki Dennison's boarding school. Miss Davidson is surprised when Nikki tells her that she wants to leave, lying her mother cannot keep up with the payments due to the cost of running their country mansion. When Nikki's mother, Laura arrives, they discuss Nikki's lies about her family, and Miss Davidson warns Laura that she is at risk of losing Nikki. Miss Davidson tells Nikki that her own father came from a poor background, and gives her time to think over her decision to leave.
21 April 1986–28 February 1990	Kenneth Muir	Roger Boyce	The Principal of Erinsborough High School. He gives Jane Harris, Charlene Mitchell, Scott Robinson and Mike Young a month's detention when they attack Sue Parker. Mr Muir accuses Nick Page of vandalising his car and expels him from school, but he reinstates him when he learns that it was Bruce Zadro. When Mr Muir sees a possum in the Coffee Shop, he reports it to the health department, which forces Harold Bishop to apologise to Hilary Robinson when he accuses her of reporting him. Mr Muir becomes engaged to Hilary, but they break up when he learns Hilary does not pay her tax bills. When Mike begins teaching at the school, Mr Muir thinks he cannot control his class and he later catches Mike kissing Jessie Ross, but does not take disciplinary action.
28 April–5 May	Gavin McKinley	Bruce Kilpatrick	When his father told him that he needed a son in order to get his inheritance, Gavin turned to Andrea Townsend, the mother of his son, Bradley, and offered her $15,000 for custody. Andrea accepted, but later took Bradley out of his school and fled to Erinsborough. Weeks later, Eileen Clarke contacts Gavin and tells him where Bradley is. Gavin goes to Ramsay Street and tries to snatch Bradley. However, Lucy Robinson makes so much noise the neighbours come running. Eileen meets with Gavin and he tells her that if she cannot convince Bradley to leave with him, Andrea would go to prison. Eileen later brings Bradley to Gavin and he takes his son and leaves. Eileen, Shane Ramsay and Clive Gibbons catch up with Gavin and stop him. Bradley is forced to choose between Gavin and Des Clarke and he chooses Des, causing Gavin to leave.
7 May–5 June	Fred Mitchell	Nick Waters	Charlene Mitchell and Henry Ramsay's father. He cheated on his wife, Madge, with his secretary, Susan Cole. Fred comes to see Madge to discuss the division of their assets. The former couple have sex at Lassiter's Hotel, which leaves Madge thinking there is a chance they could reconcile. Fred later talks about his delight at becoming a father again, leaving Madge upset and hurt. Charlene states that she wants to return with Fred, but he does not want her back. He asks Madge for her engagement ring, hinting that he wants to get back together, and she gives it to him. Fred then returns to Coffs Harbour, sells his business and throws Susan and their son, Sam out. It is later revealed that Fred has run up debts in Madge and Henry's name, ruining their credit and had gotten another woman pregnant and abandoned her.
19 May–11 June	Lewis Fleming	Clive Hearne	Lewis regularly visits Lassiter's hotel and he hires Helen Daniels' company Home James to chauffeur him and his daughter Debra Fleming around town. Helen decides to drive Lewis, when she sees Debra kissing the driver Shane Ramsay. Lewis asks that she get a male driver, but Helen threatens to take him to court for discrimination. Lewis agrees to let her drive and when he enjoys it, he asks her to collect him the following day. Helen overhears Lewis and Debra planning to con someone out of some land, and soon realises that it is her grandson, Paul Robinson. When Paul calls her "Gran" in front of Lewis and Debra, they think he has sent Helen to spy on them. Lewis later apologises to Helen and asks her out to dinner.
26 May–24 November	Dr. Leeman	Angela Disher	Dr. Leeman treats Lucy Robinson for a ruptured eardrum. Weeks later, Dr. Leeman informs Paul Robinson and Daphne Clarke that their friend Zoe Davis has suffered an ectopic pregnancy, and her chances of having another child are now reduced. Dr. Leeman also treats Daphne when she is rushed to the hospital with meningitis, and Warren Murphy who has alcoholic poisoning. Towards the end of the year, Dr. Leeman treats Scott Robinson, after he is injured in a car crash.
9 June–15 July	Jean Richards	Margot Knight	Jean begins teaching business studies classes in Erinsborough. Tom Ramsay develops a crush on Jean and they go out to dinner. Jean does not talk about her private life and pushes Tom away. Clive Gibbons later encourages her to tell Tom about her husband, Jeff. Jean explains that Jeff is a quadriplegic and she regularly visits him in hospital. Jean takes Tom to meet Jeff, who tells her she should leave him. Jean is hurt and decides to stop seeing Tom. Tom tells Jean he loves her and proposes, but Jean turns him down. Shane Ramsay offers to drive Jean home from a wedding reception, but during the journey the car crashes and Jean dies.
16–27 June	Annabelle York	Esme Melville	After attending the cabaret with Daphne Lawrence, Mrs York comes to thank her a few days later. She also asks Daphne if she can have some leftovers from the Coffee Shop, so she can feed the wildlife. Mrs York then suffers a dizzy spell. The next day, Mrs York hides from Mike Young and Nikki Dennison when they come to collect money for a new school gym. Mrs York continues to put off giving them money. When her plumbing breaks, Tom Ramsay agrees to help fix it and he believes Mrs York has been burgled. His sister, Madge, calls round and Mrs York admits that she has not been able to pay her bills and has been selling off furniture and eating leftovers. Madge and Clive Gibbons later find Mrs York unconscious in her living room. At the hospital, she is diagnosed with malnutrition and dehydration. Mrs York discharges herself and Madge and Clive help her home. While they are out getting supplies, Mrs York dies. Madge arranges her funeral, which is attended by all the neighbours.
20 June	Margaret Owens	Melinda Frith	Debra Fleming brings in Margaret to temporarily replace Daniels Corporation secretary Zoe Davis, while she is sharing an office with Paul Robinson. Margaret helps Debra by taking the key to the filing cabinet and making a copy, so Debra can continue to spy on Paul's business dealings.
2–10 July	Cassie Campbell	Margaret Umbers	Mike Young meets Cassie in Manly and saves her from drowning. Mike invites Cassie back to his place and they have sex. Mike is shocked when Cassie reveals she is a nude model, but soon realises that Cassie only does it to make enough money to keep her apartment and she does not enjoy the work. Cassie tells Charlene Mitchell to speak to her photographer about some work, but Charlene is horrified at the thought of being a nude model. Mike realises that he can not completely trust Cassie and after they say goodbye, he heads home.
6–8 July	Roger Yates	Tiriel Mora	A photographer, who works with Mike Young's girlfriend, Cassie. Roger tells Mike that he started out taking photos of buildings, before moving onto magazine and nude work. He admits that he only does it for the money. Cassie persuades Charlene Mitchell to have some photographs taken, but when she is left with Roger, she changes her mind and leaves.
7–8 July	Jeff Richards	Paul Young	Jean Richards' husband, who became a quadriplegic following the Vietnam War. Jean regularly visits Jeff and one day she brings Tom Ramsay to see him too. Jeff tells his wife that Tom sees her more than just a friend and she should be with him.
11–21 July	Tony Chapman	Peter Bensley	Zoe Davis' former boyfriend, who left her to live in England. Upon his return to Australia, Tony runs into Zoe and their feelings for one another return. Tony is shocked when he learns Zoe had recently suffered a miscarriage, but after they talk, they decided to give their relationship another go. Tony asks Zoe to work for him as his secretary and she accepts. Tony proposes to Zoe, but she asks for time to think about it. She then tells Tony that her miscarriage has left her with a small chance of ever having children. When Tony does not say anything, Zoe walks out and plans to leave Erinsborough. Tony speaks to Clive Gibbons and admits that he wants to be with Zoe despite what she told him. The couple reunite and then leave together.
15 July–19 August	Alex Carter	Kevin Summers	After Shane Ramsay is involved in a car accident, Alex stops and gives him a drink of brandy. Alex later gets a job at The Waterhole and sets about befriending the locals, so he can steal from their houses. Vicki Gibbons later catches Alex trying to steal from Number 22 and he threatens to kill her parents, unless she keeps quiet. When Alex goes to Graham Gibbons' surgery, Vicki recognises him and tells her father. Alex knocks Graham out and then steals the takings from the pub. Graham's brother, Clive, spots Alex and gives chase. Alex injures himself and is taken to hospital, before being arrested.
16 July–22 August	Graham Gibbons	Peter Harvey-Wright	Graham brings his family to Erinsborough to stay with his brother, Clive. Graham is not happy when he learns Clive has given up medicine and constantly goes on about it. Graham begins working at a surgery. Graham learns that his daughter, Vicki, was threatened by a man, who broke into Number 22. Vicki points out Alex Carter as the man and Graham confronts him. Alex hits him and Graham is left unconscious. At the hospital, Graham lapses into a coma. When he wakes up, Graham leaves his surgery to Clive and returns home. In 1989, Graham is injured in an outback accident and phones Clive in order for him to manage his practice, which he agrees to.
16 July–22 August	Kate Gibbons	Jenny Seedsman	Kate and her family come to stay with Clive Gibbons in Erinsborough. Kate gets caught in the middle of a few arguments between Clive and her husband, Graham. She later supports Clive when he breaks up with a girlfriend. Kate finds employment at the Daniels Corporation, but quits when Paul Robinson is rude to her. After Graham is attacked, Kate decides the whole family should return home.
16 July–22 August	Vicki Gibbons	Charmaine Gorman	Graham and Kate Gibbons' daughter. She forms close friendships with her uncle Clive and Lucy Robinson. When Vicki discovers a man trying to steal her father's stamp collection, she is threatened into keeping quiet. Vicki begins having nightmares and eventually tells Helen Daniels what happened. Vicki recognises Alex Carter as the burglar and tells Graham, who asks her to hide. Alex then attacks Graham, knocking him out. The family leave Erinsborough shortly afterwards.
29 July–8 August	Louise Lawry	Felicity Soper	Louise visits Clive Gibbons to find out more about her sister, Linda, who died. Louise and Clive spend a lot of time together, and Louise develops feelings for Clive. However, Louise tells Kate Gibbons that she is not ready for a relationship, especially a rebound. Louise says goodbye to Clive and leaves for England.
1 August–5 November	Mr White	Douglas Bennett	Mr White tells Madge Mitchell that it might be better if her daughter, Charlene, leaves school and train as a mechanic if that is what she wants. Mr White is later forced to intervene when Charlene, Jane Harris, Scott Robinson and Mike Young are involved in an attack on Sue Parker. Sue later tells Mr White that she overheard Scott telling Nikki Dennison that he is preparing to cheat in his exams by writing formulas on his arms. Mr White confronts Scott, asking him to roll up his sleeves. However, Scott has already washed off the writing and Sue is left looking like a liar.
13–27 August	Patty Collins	Lisa Green	Jack Lassiter allows former teacher Patty to stay in his caravan in Erinsborough. On the night she moves in, Shane Ramsay also decides to stay there and accidentally ends up in bed with Patty. They agree to share the caravan. Patty tells Shane about her adventures on her bike and he thinks about joining her on her trip to Brisbane. Paul Robinson gives Patty a job at The Waterhole pub. When Alex Carter steals the pub's takings, Paul initially blames Patty and she quits. Paul later apologises. Patty decides to move on and Shane decides to come with her, but then learns that his ex-fiancée is in hospital. Patty tells Shane that if he is able to move on from Daphne, he should come, but she is not waiting for him. Shane realises Patty is right and he goes to Brisbane with her.
8 September–6 November	Ray Murphy	Norman Yemm	Ray goes to The Waterhole pub and gets drunk. He also tries to impress Madge Mitchell. Madge confiscates Ray's car keys, telling him that she cannot allow him to drive and Ray accuses her of theft. Paul Robinson makes Madge return the keys and Ray leaves, but he returns to apologise. Ray asks Madge out on a date, but she cancels when she learns Ray has sold his house to developers. Ray and Shane Ramsay convince Madge to give Ray another chance. Ray does not appear concerned by his son, Warren's drinking problem. When Warren is attacked, Ray becomes angry with Charlene Mitchell when she cannot remember what happened. Warren explains that he defended Charlene from a group of guys and they attacked him. Madge and Ray argue about whose child is to blame. Warren tells Ray that he drinks to cope with the divorce and his exams. Both Ray and Warren vow to give up alcohol. Ray gives Madge a loan to buy her house and they part as friends
12–16 September	Bill Parker	Mark Allen	Bill is Sue Parker's father. He is angry when Sue is assaulted by either Jane Harris, Charlene Mitchell, Scott Robinson or Mike Young. Sue claims that it was a gang attack and Bill threatens to sue them. Jane owns up to hitting Sue, but explains that Sue had provoked her by sending poison pen letters to her grandmother, Nell Mangel. Sue confesses to exaggerating her story and Bill backs down.
15–26 September	Peter Smith	Tom Coltrane	The manager of a construction firm, who asks Paul Robinson to invest in a new supermarket project. Paul learns that Ramsay Street is set to be demolished to build an access road to the supermarket. Peter pressures Paul into accepting the deal, by telling him that Rosemary Daniels would be disappointed if the Daniels Corporation lost out. When Peter returns, he discovers that only a few residents have agreed to sell their houses and tells Paul to use any tactic necessary to get the job done. Peter suggests committing arson to get the last residents to move, including Paul's family. He then threatens Paul when he says he will not get involved in anything illegal. Paul then cuts ties with construction firm. Peter tries to buy Numbers 22 and 24, but Paul tells him that he is not prepared to sell.
24 September	Jenny Pearson	Leanne Edelsten	When Charlene Mitchell and Jane Harris decide they want to be cheerleaders, Clive Gibbons contacts Jenny, a choreographer who used to work for him. Jenny agrees to give Charlene and Jane an audition on the condition that Clive pays back some money he owes her. At the end of the audition, Jenny tells Jane that she has potential to become a dancer, while Charlene should stick to her dream of being a mechanic.
30 September–1 October	Brian Hanson	Jon Finlayson	A music producer who works with Molly Meldrum. He and Molly seek out Charlene Mitchell when they hear her singing back up vocals on a demo tape sent to them by Scott Robinson and Mike Young. Brian invites Charlene to the music studio to record some tracks, but she realises that she is not interested in singing and wants to complete her HSC instead.
8–9 October	Grace Barnett	Marijke Mann	An old friend of Helen Daniels. When they were younger, Grace had a one-night stand with Helen's husband, Bill. Grace gets in touch with Helen and she comes to dinner. Helen's sister, Laura Dennison warns Grace to leave, before Helen realises that Grace has been to visit Bill's grave earlier in the day. Laura catches up with her the following day and Grace admits that she was in love with Bill. Grace decides to leave, so she does not cause Helen any pain. However, Helen recognises Grace's handwriting from a note left at Bill's grave and Laura tells Helen the truth about Grace and Bill.
13 October 1986, 1 July 1987	David Turner	Guy May	Scott Robinson invites David to play in a game of cricket between the Ramsay and Robinson families. David attends Scott and Charlene's wedding.
13–15 October	Philip Nolan	James Melchior	Daphne Lawrence and Zoe Davis' friend. When he visits Erinsborough, he stays with Daphne and her husband, Des. Des becomes jealous of Philip and cannot wait for him to leave. Philip picks up on Des's feelings and moves into a hotel. Daphne makes Des apologise to Philip and they get on better.
15 October	Peggy O'Hara	Sue Jones	When Laura Dennison is diagnosed with multiple sclerosis, her friend Clive Gibbons introduces her to Peggy, a counsellor from the MS clinic, who explains that 85% of people with MS lead normal lives. Peggy also speaks with Laura's daughter, Nikki, and tells her that Laura needs support, not mothering.
16–21 October	Ted Gibbons	Max Meldrum	Ted comes to stay with his nephew, Clive, when he learns how well he is doing. Ted believes Clive is married to Susan Cole and her son, Sam's father. Clive introduces Ted to Ruth Wilson and they bond. When Ted sees Susan hugging Paul Robinson, he tells Clive that she is cheating on him. Clive then admits that he is not married to Susan. Ted decides to leave and promises to meet up with Ruth when he goes to London.
10 November	Mrs Lee	Wynne Pullman	Mrs Lee becomes the first victim of the "bikie bandit", when her handbag was stolen by a person on a motorbike. Daphne Clarke tries to calm Mrs Lee down with a cup of tea in the Coffee Shop. Later that week, Kelly Morgan is revealed to be the bandit.
12 November 1986 – 28 January 1987	Kelly Morgan	Jodie Yemm	Kelly snatches Eileen Clarke's bag and later tries to use her bank card, but Shane Ramsay catches her. Daphne Lawrence pays Kelly's bail and takes her in. Kelly steals Paul Robinson's car, but her conscience gets the better of her and she returns it. Daphne asks Shane to let Kelly help him with his gardening jobs and he agrees. When Shane is bitten by a snake, Kelly uses his motorbike to reach the nearest phone. Paul catches her and accuses her of stealing the bike, but eventually gives her the benefit of the doubt and Shane gets the help he needs. Kelly then develops a crush on Shane. Kelly is given community service for snatching Eileen's bag and she is sent to work in a care home. The matron is impressed with Kelly's work and offers her a full-time job with accommodation, which Kelly accepts. Kelly thanks Daphne and Shane for helping her.
