= Clive Gibbons =

Fictional character from the Australian soap opera Neighbours

- Neighbours character
- Portrayed by: Geoff Paine
- Duration: 1986–1987, 1989, 2017–2022
- First appearance: 21 January 1986
- Last appearance: 28 July 2022
- Introduced by: Reg Watson (1986); Don Battye (1989); Jason Herbison (2017)
- Spin-off appearances: SheilaTV (2018); Sheila & Clive (2019)
In-universe information
- Occupation: Doctor; Entrepreneur; COO of Erinsborough Hospital
- Father: Charles Gibbons
- Brothers: Graham Gibbons
- Sisters: Claire Gibbons
- Daughters: Alice
- Granddaughters: Bella Rose
- Uncles: Ted Gibbons
- Nieces: Vicki Gibbons

Clive Gibbons is a fictional character from the Australian soap opera Neighbours, played by Geoff Paine. Paine was spotted by the Reg Grundy Organisation and offered the role of Clive. He made his first screen appearance during the episode broadcast on 21 January 1986. Clive's storylines included running a gorillagram agency, setting up a gardening business, saving Lucy Robinson's life and falling in love with Susan Cole. Paine decided not to renew his contract, as he feared being typecast and felt the role was no longer believable. He departed Neighbours on 27 February 1987, but made a brief return in 1989. Paine reprised the role 28 years later, and Clive returned on a semi-regular basis from 9 March 2017. He was reintroduced as the chief operating officer of Erinsborough Hospital. Paine felt that Clive had matured during his time away from Erinsborough, but said his "cheeky side" would still appear every so often. He was restored to the series' main cast in July 2020 and appeared in the final episode of the original run of Neighbours on 28 July 2022.

== Casting ==
Neighbours marks Paine's first professional acting role. The Grundy Organisation discovered him while he was performing in a college production at the Victoria Arts Centre, and they asked him to come in for a screen test, before offering him the role of Clive. Paine almost turned down the role as he looked down on acting in a soap. He said "I suppose at the time I was a bit too idealistic about the world of acting. Playing a messenger in a gorilla suit might not be King Lear, but at least it pays the rent." Paine later explained that he was reluctant to take the role because of credibility with soap operas. But he was encouraged to take the opportunity and do what he could with the part. He also knew that his experience on Neighbours would be invaluable due to its fast production and high publicity.

== Development ==
=== Characterisation ===
Stephen Cook of TV Week wrote that Clive was unusual, as his life was not beset with romances and traumas that were typically associated with other TV bachelor characters. He called him "a thoroughly 'normal' guy, a young man having a good time and trying to find his niche in life." Paine asked producers not to give his character a romantic storyline straight off, so he would have a chance to enter the series and develop on his own. He told Cook that Clive is trying to work out what he wants to do with his life, which is all he can think about, not that he is not interested in romance.

Little is known about Clive when he arrives in Erinsborough, except that he runs a gorillagram agency. Later scenes explored his fictional backstory and revealed that Clive is the son of a wealthy doctor, and he too had a medical career, but became disillusioned with it. He performs an emergency tracheotomy on Lucy Robinson (Kylie Flinker) when she is stung by a bee. Paine explained, "Clive tried to reject his medical history, but it was thrown back at him when he had to perform the tracheotomy on Lucy. But he wasn't worried about doing the operation; he just did it." Paine also told Cook that Clive has cut himself off from his family and rejected the lifestyle they set up for him. He is taking responsibility for himself and enjoys the freedom he now has. He added, "But he's a serious guy who has made a serious decision to have some fun."

Josephine Monroe, author of Neighbours: The First 10 Years, said Clive brought a breath of fresh air to Ramsay Street when he moved in. She described the character as "one of life's eccentrics" and said he took care of people and often lured them into his latest harebrained scheme. Simon Plant from the Herald Sun said Clive was "mild-mannered". Dave Hogan and Neil Wallis of The Neighbours Factfile said Clive was "cheerful and slightly wacky." They called him the "court jester" of Ramsay Street, and said he was the model on which the character of Henry Ramsay (Craig McLachlan) was based. Clive's gorillagram agency outraged some of neighbours, particularly Max Ramsay (Francis Bell).

Following the character's 2017 return, Paine thought Clive was "a different man". Where the younger Clive was "happy-go-lucky", the older Clive has matured and become more conservative. Paine confirmed that Clive's "cheeky side" would still appear every so often. He also said that he enjoys playing the character, as he is "fun and irreverent".

=== Departure ===
After little more than a year in the role, Paine decided not to renew his contract after fearing that he may be typecast. He also wanted to develop his acting abilities in stage productions, having gone straight from drama school to Neighbours. His departure was publicised in the 8 November 1986 edition of TV Week, where Stephen Cook reported that Paine had quit the serial and would finish up when production took a break at the end of the year, with his final scenes airing in early 1987. Paine's decision came shortly after co-star Peter O'Brien left to take a role in The Flying Doctors on a rival network. Network 10 tried to keep Paine's departure a secret and he was not allowed to speak to TV Week about his exit. Paine later explained that Clive was too nice and the role was no longer believable. He said, "Clive was becoming just too good to be true. I mean, the guy was only 24 but he spent every spare minute either fixing someone's love life or Daphne's coffee machine." He did not regret leaving the show despite its popularity at the time, and was pleased with the career direction he took. In July 1989, Kevin Sadlier of The Sydney Morning Herald said that during research for an article on the show's 1000th episode, he heard of a plan to bring back a popular cast member from the previous year, and speculated that it was Paine. Paine went on to make a brief return later that year.

=== Reintroduction ===
In a December 2016 interview with Daniel Kilkelly of Digital Spy, Neighbours executive producer Jason Herbison teased the return of a series regular from 1986 to 1987. Herbison said the character would return in a recurring capacity and would be seen in "a work environment". Paine's management later confirmed that he had reprised his role as Clive. Paine told Johnathon Hughes of the Radio Times that he had enquired about a return through his agent and the show's producers agreed to bring the character back. Paine also said that he had been asked to return numerous times since his departure, but he had always been busy with his acting career or personal life.

Clive made his return during the episode broadcast on 9 March 2017. He was introduced as the Chief operating officer (COO) of Erinsborough Hospital. Paine said that in his time away from Erinsborough, Clive had "matured and is bit more buttoned up", but he wants to "re-establish a part of his life that he enjoyed, which was his time in Ramsay Street." Speaking about Clive's friendly rivalry with Paul Robinson (Stefan Dennis), whom he was once in a love triangle with, Paine said that they would have "their moments", but Clive would not be a push over, especially as he holds a senior position career-wise, while Paul is something of "a wheeler dealer" and tends to get what he wants. He thought it would be interesting to see how they get on during the future.

The character was added to the opening titles in July 2020 despite not being a full-time cast member. Herbison stated that Paine will continue appearing on a semi-regular basis, but Clive was added to the titles due to his popularity, adding "We've included him in the titles to reflect Dr Clive's importance to the community and we know the fans wanted it too – including fan club president Colette Mann!"

=== Relationship with Sheila Canning ===
Paine teased a potential romance for Clive following his reintroduction, commenting "anything is possible". Shortly after, a relationship was established between Clive and Sheila Canning (Colette Mann). Both actors were glad to be paired up for the storyline, as they had previously worked together in a stage production and had known each other for a number of years. The couple get off to a bad start when Clive wrongly accuses Sheila's granddaughter Xanthe Canning (Lily Van Der Meer) of stealing hospital medication. They clash a few more times, before Clive asks Sheila out on a date as he thinks she is "fiery, and a bit barmy." Mann commented that Sheila loves that Clive is the COO of the Erinsborough Hospital, but she is wary of his intellect. Paine thought Clive and Sheila were very different people, but found that Sheila "harks back to Clive’s gorilla-gram days, she loosens him up and brings out his cheeky side, and she enjoys the affection that comes back her way. The relationship has happened organically through our chemistry. Clive describes Sheila as provocative and irritating but he's enjoying being with her!" Clive and Sheila's relationship is initially short lived, after she receives a letter from a former partner, who is ill and wants to see her. Mann confirmed that Herbison had promised to reintroduce Clive into Sheila's life "with a big bang". Their new relationship lasts until 2021 and Clive begins dating Jane Harris (Annie Jones).

=== Character reflection ===
Upon the news that Neighbours would be concluding in July 2022, Paine told Digital Spy of filming the finale, "It's a tad emotional, I've got to say. As you get closer to the end of everything, you realise you'll be finishing up a storyline, or that might be the last time you work with a particular director or actor. We are having those moments where they will say 'that's the final scene for this director, or this crew member'. It is emotional, but of course we can't stop, so it's also ramping up. We don't have that luxury of three more months to tie things up. There is an end date and we just have to build to it, shoot and get everything in the can. The work is happening, but there is that background bass note that it is coming to an end." Paine explained that announcement of the show's cancellation was and was not a surprise for him, since it had been teased in the months beforehand. Teasing Clive's part in the final episode, Paine explained, "Things don't always run smoothly in the world and Clive is no exception to that rule. He will have some challenges before the end of the show."

Paine also explained his absence from the show in the early months of 2022, saying that he was busy with stage shows and that writers chose to pop Clive "in and out, as he can be utilised". When asked of his fondest memories of being on the serial, Paine said, "You're talking to a guy who had this as a first acting job. I didn't know what I was doing and I was bluffing, as we all do with our first jobs. You bluff a level of confidence that you don't really have. I do remember being in the gorilla suit, which we shot in day one for my character. I was wondering what on earth I was doing in this gorilla suit and: 'Is this the future of showbusiness? I just wear funny outfits?'" Paine said that he "found the show to be a wonderful, fast-paced storytelling factory", and that he "loved the 'gift of the gab' stuff" he did. Paine also recalled a Christmas episode where Clive had a dream sequence showing Santa Claus and his neighbours as Christmas characters, calling is wonderful, imaginative and creative. After expressing his gratitude for being reintroduced into the cast in 2017, Paine responded to whether Sheila or Jane was more suited to Clive by saying, "It depends on the mood Clive's in! Sheila was this extraordinary, bold, emotional sort of character, while Jane is much more contained and controlled. They brought out different aspects of Clive's personality." Additionally, Paine told Daniel Kilkelly that giving his experience to younger cast members was something he enjoyed and he hopes that Home and Away will become the new training ground for people in the television industry after Neighbours ceases production.

== Storylines ==
=== 1986–1989 ===
Clive runs a gorillagram agency from Number 22 Ramsay Street, which upsets neighbour Max Ramsay. Clive and Max clash right away, but Clive manages to win over the other residents. Clive invites Daphne Lawrence (Elaine Smith) to move into his spare room when her engagement to Des Clarke (Paul Keane) falls apart. They are briefly joined there by Daphne's best friend, Zoe Davis (Ally Fowler) and then by Mike Young (Guy Pearce). As well as running his gorillagram business, Clive teamed up with Shane Ramsay (Peter O'Brien) to form a gardening business called Ramsay and Gibbons Gardening Service or RAGGS. Clive's real profession is revealed when he saves Lucy Robinson's (Kylie Flinker) life after she is stung by a bee and cannot breathe. Clive performs a Tracheotomy on Lucy on the Robinson's kitchen table and saves her life. Clive tells his neighbours that he is a doctor, but he quit medicine when he made a mistake, which led to the death of his girlfriend, Linda.

Clive's brother, Graham (Peter Harvey-Wright), a GP visits with his wife, Kate (Jenny Seedsman) and daughter Vicki (Charmaine Gorman). Clive realises that Graham would badger him about returning to medicine and he tells him about Linda's death. Graham continues to badger Clive until he agrees to become a doctor again. Graham and his family leave after Alex Carter (Kevin Summers), a robber threatens them. Clive befriends Susan Cole (Gloria Ajenstat) and offers her and her son, Sam, a place to live. Clive falls in love with Susan, but she falls for her boss, Paul Robinson. When his uncle Ted (Max Meldrum) comes to visit, Clive asks Susan to pretend to be his wife in order for Clive to say he is a successful family man. Susan agrees, but Ted sees her kissing Paul and confronts Clive. Clive tells Ted the truth.

When Paul rejects her, Susan is comforted by Clive and he tells her that he is in love with her. Susan accepts a marriage proposal from Clive, but as Clive starts planning a wedding, Susan realises that she does not love Clive and she leaves Erinsborough. Clive has depression and takes his anger out on Paul. He eventually bounces back and decides to move into the flat behind his surgery before leaving Erinsborough. Two years later, Clive makes a brief return and stays at Number 28 while Des is away and makes friends with Melanie Pearson (Lucinda Cowden). He also provides Paul with a shoulder to cry on following the end of his marriage. Clive gets a call from Graham who is injured in an accident and needs someone to run his surgery in the country. Clive then leaves Ramsay Street again for the outback.

=== 2017–2022 ===
Nearly 28 years later, Clive returns to Erinsborough as the new COO of the local hospital. He meets with David Tanaka (Takaya Honda) and Aaron Brennan (Matt Wilson) to discuss the public opening of the new spinal unit. He later catches up with Paul in The Waterhole. After a meeting about attracting donors, Aaron asks Clive for his help in finding a record of David and his brother Leo Tanaka's (Tim Kano) father, as they were born in a Western Sydney hospital, where Clive once worked. Jasmine Udagawa (Kaori Maeda-Judge) offers to make a donation to the spinal unit if Clive calls off his search. Clive later tells David that he could not find any information on his father, before admitting to Paul that he had already called in the favour when Jasmine offered him the money. Leo confronts Clive about accepting a bribe from Jasmine, but Clive tells him that there was no information about their father, but Jasmine was unaware when she made her donation. Clive interviews Brooke Butler (Fifi Box) for a fundraising job, but Sheila Canning warns him that Brooke is a scam artist, before she tries to take back what she said. However, Clive reveals that he has spoken to Paul and Karl Kennedy (Alan Fletcher), who confirmed Sheila's allegations, so he will not be offering Brooke the job.

A few months later, Clive asks Karl to investigate some missing morphine. He finds Sheila checking up on her granddaughter, Xanthe and asks her out to lunch, but she cancels when Xanthe is accused of taking the morphine. Clive comes across Sheila in the city and he helps her to search Xanthe, who has run away from school. Clive and Sheila spend the rest of the afternoon together and Clive asks her out on a date to an art gallery. Clive and Sheila spend a lot of time together in the ensuing weeks, and he mentions to her that he has at least two children. Their relationship ends when Sheila is contacted by her former partner, Russell Brennan (Russell Kiefel) Sheila tells Clive that she needs to know the relationship is definitely over, before moving on with him. Clive vouches for Nick Petrides (Damien Fotiou), an oncologist who was arrested for poisoning Paul with unnecessary chemotherapy. Clive's testimony ensures Nick's release from prison so he can advise with Terese Willis's (Rebekah Elmaloglou) cancer treatment.

Months later, Sheila offers to help Clive with community outreach for the new hospital wing, before asking if they can rekindle their relationship. Clive is reluctant as he was hurt by their break up. Clive teaches an adult TAFE class at the local community centre, which Sheila attends. After the first class, Sheila confronts Clive for being harsh on her and he admits that he still has feelings for her. They arrange a date and give their relationship another chance. Clive allows Izzy Hoyland (Natalie Bassingthwaite) to have the naming rights to the new hospital wing, following a $20 million donation, which upsets Paul. But following Izzy's departure, Clive informs Karl the new wing is cancelled. Karl is left without a job as a result, until Clive offers him a job with research trials. Clive arranges for Ross Wilson to play at The Waterhole for Sheila, but she runs off when she is invited up on stage, and admits that she has been having memory problems. Clive reassures her and run some tests, which show the memory issues are a side effect of her heart medication.

Karl suggests implementing an MRI screening program, but Clive rejects the idea for being too expensive. Karl secures funding from Rita Newland (Lisa Kay), who plots to have Clive removed from his job. Clive rejects a remyelination therapy trial for the hospital and backs David for a position on the board, but he changes his vote to Karl, knowing that his position as COO is tenuous. As the trial goes ahead, Clive receives an anonymous call telling him the results have been tampered with and he shuts it down. He later offers Karl a job as a GP. Clive and Sheila break up, and he begins a relationship with Beverly Robinson (Shaunna O'Grady). Sheila is jealous and constantly tries to sabotage their dates. After an argument, Clive and Sheila have sex and begin an affair. Clive eventually breaks up with Beverly for Sheila, and a furious Beverly throws a bucket of manure over Sheila in revenge. Clive goes travelling and when he returns, he and Sheila agree that while neither of them wants to remarry, they are committed to their future together. Sheila is devastated when her son Gary Canning (Damien Richardson) is murdered, and Clive supports her as she grieves. Months later, Clive supports Sheila when she admits that she covered up an attack on her grandson Levi Canning (Richie Morris) when he was a child, which lead to Levi developing epilepsy. Levi undergoes a medical review to assess whether he is able to continue as a police officer. Feeling guilty, Sheila tampers with the review but soon confesses when she realises the severity of her actions. Clive then breaks up with her and quickly starts a relationship with Sheila's neighbour, Jane Harris. Sheila is devastated and attempts to break them up by bringing Jane's ex-partner, Des to Erinsborough. Her scheming fails and she comes to accept that Clive and Jane are serious.

Jane and Clive's relationship strengthens and she cares for his fern while he is away. Jane is panicked when the fern dies and Clive distances himself from her in his upset. They reconcile and Clive briefly stays with Jane, her daughter Nicolette Stone (Charlotte Chimes) and Nicolette's girlfriend Chloe Brennan (April Rose Pengilly) while his house is being worked on. Nicolette becomes quickly exasperated by Clive's particular ways and he moves out when he overhears her venting about how unreasonable he is. Clive supports Jane when Nicolette flees Erinsborough after her engagement to Chloe collapses. When she returns, she and Jane move in with David. Clive backs David and nurse Freya Wozniak (Phoebe Roberts) when their conduct in the death of Gareth Bateman (Jack Pearson) is investigated. He's devastated when they later confess that they let Gareth die. Jane urges Clive to speak with David but he chooses to keep his distance. Jane's son Byron Stone (Joe Klocek) moves to Erinsborough and becomes suspicious that one of his escort clients Danielle Pendbury (Christine Stephen-Daly) is involved with Clive. Nicolette catches Clive and Danielle in a compromising position, forcing Clive to confess to Jane that Danielle is a benefactor to the hospital who he previously had a sexual relationship with while she was his patient. Jane is upset when Danielle admits that Clive was considering her offer to spend one more night together. Jane breaks up with Clive and shortly after, he receives a call from Sheila, who departed Erinsborough a number of months prior.

Clive dresses up in his gorillagram to try and win Jane back, but is interrupted by someone on their motorbike. Clive sees that same person at Lassiters and yells at them, but then realises it is Mike, Jane's old love. Clive asks Mike if he is trying to restart a relationship with Jane and Mike says no. Later, Clive has a few drinks and becomes drunk, then picks a fight with Mike when he sees him spending time with Jane. They fight and Clive is forced to accept that his relationship is over. Clive attends a party on Ramsay Street later in the day, and has drinks with Des and parties with the residents.

== Reception ==
TV Week's Stephen Cook observed that ever since he joined Neighbours, Paine had become a favourite with viewers who liked "his nice-guy on-screen personality."

To celebrate the 20th anniversary of Neighbours, a reporter from the BBC asked readers to nominate their twenty favourite obscure characters. Clive was not included in the list, but the reporter revealed they had received many suggestions asking him to be included. They said that Clive's popularity disqualified him and that he "lacked sufficient obscurity". Another writer for the BBC called Clive the "true genius of Neighbours." Lorna Cooper of MSN said Clive was "lovely", while Tom Adair of The Scotsman dubbed the character "wacky". A Lowculture writer stated that Clive performing an emergency tracheotomy on Jim Robinson's kitchen table was one of Neighbours' great moments. A BBC reporter agreed, saying Clive's most notable moment was "Performing an emergency operation on the Robinson's kitchen table and saving Lucy."

Daniel Martin of The Guardian included Clive's 1986 dream on his list of Favourite Christmas Soap Moments. Martin commented, "Not the greatest dream sequence in Neighbours history (that gong has to go to the iconic Bouncer's Dream), but this candy-coated reminder to the grim British contingent of how it should be done is burned onto the brains of twentysomethings nationwide. Doctor Clive – refereeing a boxing match between Mike and Shane for the heart of Plain Jane Superbrain – is knocked out and goes into a bizarre festive dream sequence where the cast were re-imagined as pantomime characters. Clive was Santa, Mike and Shane were Tweedle Dum and Dee, Paul Robinson some nameless panto villain – and Scott and Charlene were in Europe pretending to be pop stars."

In her 1994 book, The Neighbours Programme Guide, Josephine Monroe revealed that Clive became popular with viewers and his 1989 return was scripted to set up a spin-off series, City Hospital. A pilot was made, but it was not picked up by any television networks. Polly Hudson of the Daily Mirror wondered why Paine did not go on to have an acting career in Hollywood, like "mean old Jim Robinson", commenting that he was "surely the most talented comedy actor of all time". Laura-Jayne Tyler of Inside Soap praised Clive's 2017 return, saying "Treat of the week was the return of Dr Clive Gibbons to Neighbours. A real 80s favourite!" Clive was placed at number twenty-seven on the Huffpost's "35 greatest Neighbours characters of all time" feature. Journalist Adam Beresford credited "loveable" Clive with "helping to establish the show's wacky tone during its early heyday." Beresford added that Clive's reintroduction "gave long-term viewers a nostalgia hit."
