= Shane Ramsay =

Fictional character from Neighbours (Australian TV soap)

- Neighbours character
- Portrayed by: Peter O'Brien
- Duration: 1985–1987, 2022, 2024–2025
- First appearance: 18 March 1985
- Last appearance: 11 December 2025
- Created by: Reg Watson
- Introduced by: Reg Watson (1985); Jason Herbison (2022, 2024)
In-universe information
- Occupation: Gardener; Chauffeur
- Family: Ramsay
- Father: Max Ramsay
- Mother: Maria Ramsay
- Half-brothers: Danny Ramsay
- Half-sisters: Jill Ramsay
- Wife: Yvette Ramsay (divorced)
- Sons: Max Ramsay
- Daughters: Saskia Ramsay
- Grandfathers: Dan Ramsay; Franco Rossi
- Grandmothers: Edna Ramsay; Anna Rossi Sr.
- Uncles: Tom Ramsay
- Aunts: Madge Bishop; Anna Rossi
- First cousins: Henry Ramsay; Charlene Robinson
- Other relatives: Roxy Willis

Shane Ramsay is a fictional character from the Australian television soap opera Neighbours, played by Peter O'Brien. He made his first appearance during the show's first episode, broadcast on 18 March 1985. Shane is the son of Max Ramsay (Francis Bell) and Maria Ramsay (Dasha Bláhová). His storylines included training to be an Olympic swimmer and being involved in two car crashes, with the second killing Jean Richards (Margot Knight), leaving Shane facing manslaughter charges. Writers also created a relationship story with Daphne Lawrence (Elaine Smith). O'Brien decided to leave Neighbours in 1986 and Shane departed during the episode broadcast on 3 March 1987. O'Brien reprised the role in July 2022 for what was then thought to be the show's final episodes. Shane returned on 12 November 2024, bringing his son Max Ramsay (Ben Jackson) to Erinsborough, before 26 November 2024 when he departed again, returning a few months later for the show's 40th anniversary in March 2025. He again returned to Erinsborough in December 2025 for the show's final two weeks, proposing his new suburb development Ramsay Hills to the residents of Ramsay Street, as it faces threat of demolition.

== Casting ==
Peter O'Brien auditioned for the role of Shane Ramsay twice in 1984 and following the cancellation of medical series Starting Out, he was cast as the older Ramsay brother. O'Brien made his debut in Neighbours' first episode. Shane was one of Reg Watson's original Neighbours characters. The role of Shane made O'Brien a household name in his home country of Australia and overseas. Stefan Dennis originally auditioned for the role of Shane, but he was later cast as Paul Robinson instead. In the video The Official Neighbours Special: The First Ten Years, released in 1995, O'Brien said that he was working in England at the time when he received the role of Shane and he was not expecting Neighbours to last more than two years.

== Development ==
Shane was described by Network Ten as a "very together guy, despite being deprived of a normal childhood because of his father's obsession with his diving training". They also added that Shane had independence and an "inner strength". O'Brien described the character of Shane as "a bit of a misfit". In their 1989 book, The Neighbours Factfile, Neil Wallis and Dave Hogan wrote that Shane's father Max Ramsay (Francis Bell), had an obsession with him becoming a champion diver and that made Shane's childhood difficult. He gained an "independent spirit" and became "easygoing" and a "genuine nice guy". Shane has a keen interest in motorbikes and this often leads him into trouble. He is a "strong silent" type of character but he still managed to "break the hearts of most of the available women who strolled down Ramsay Street." Mary Riddell of the Daily Mirror observed "Like any self-respecting male sex symbol, Shane has designer muscles and a beach boy suntan – coupled, in his case, with the brightness of a 40 watt light bulb." O'Brien told her that he chose to play Shane "a bit dumber" than he was meant to be and more quick-tempered, as he did not want the character to be so nice. He felt that Shane was wimpy.

Shane was paired with Daphne Lawrence (Elaine Smith) for a romance story. During the show's first-season finale, Daphne ends the relationship as she is in love with Des Clarke (Paul Keane). After breaking up with Des, Daphne reconciles with Shane and they become engaged, however, Daphne worries that she is rushing into marriage on the rebound and they end the engagement. A love triangle was then established between Daphne, Shane and Des. In June 1986, Stephen Cook from TV Week reported that Daphne would accept a marriage proposal from one of the men, which would result in marriage. Smith thought Daphne was best suited to Shane and said she had a great deal of love for him. O'Brien told Cook that as far as Shane is concerned, Daphne is the only woman he has ever loved and feels that he is more suited to her than Des. Whilst drunk at Paul and Terry Inglis' (Maxine Klibingaitis) wedding reception, Shane boasts about how badly he treats Daphne.

Writers later devised a dramatic story for Shane, which sees him involved in a car crash which kills Jean Richards (Margot Knight). Shane is driving home from Daphne and Des Clarke's (Paul Keane) wedding when he loses control of his car and crashes into a stationary vehicle. O'Brien told Patrice Fidgeon from TV Week that "there's a blowout just as Shane is trying to negotiate a difficult turn coming down the hill. He loses control of his car and careers into a parked car." Jean dies and Shane feels guilty because he had drunk alcohol at the party. Though Shane had only drunk a small amount of alcohol. Alex Carter (Kevin Summers), a local resident gives him some brandy to calm his nerves following the crash. O'Brien revealed that Shane faces manslaughter charges as a result. The police arrive and breathalyse Shane, who is arrested and later released on bail. O'Brien explained that "if he loses his license Shane feels that's the end of his livelihood. But what shatters him the most is that he has killed a person."

In July 1986, O'Brien spoke publicly about his intention to leave the show. He stated that he had always planned to assess his future with the show after eighteen months. He originally planned to leave in September 1986, but added a three-month extension onto his commitments to the show. O'Brien did leave Neighbours later that year. The Grundy Organisation tried to convince O'Brien to stay, fearing that the show would suffer from his departure, but O'Brien was determined to move on. He later said that his departure was nothing to do with being typecast, but rather the amount of exposure. He explained "I've had enough of my shirts being ripped off my back. I've had to sneak out of places through the back door. If I go shopping or to the pictures, I get mobbed."

On 3 March 2022, it was announced O'Brien had agreed to reprise the role for the serial's final episodes. Shane returns during the episode broadcast on 13 July in the UK and 20 July 2022 in Australia. Joe Julians of Digital Spy reported that Shane returns to Erinsborough after becoming nostalgic. He also wants to "put some Ramsay roots back into the community again." Paul comes across Shane making noise with other guests outside Lassiters and they are "thrilled" to see each other again, before Shane reveals he has become a millionaire and wants to invest in Paul's business as joint partners. However, as Shane slowly learns about Paul's actions during the past few years, he is forced to rethink his deal.

In October 2024, it was announced on the Neighbours official Instagram account that Shane would be returning to Neighbours for a "visit" alongside his son and new character Max Ramsay (Ben Jackson). In January 2025, it was announced that Shane would return again for the show's 40th anniversary in March 2025. In November 2025, it was confirmed that O'Brien had again reprised his role of Shane for Neighbours' final two weeks due to air in December 2025. Spoilers written by Daniel Kilkelly for Digital Spy revealed that Shane returns to Erinsborough with a "controversial plan to rebuild their community in a fresh spot". Further spoilers reveal that he will pitch his new suburb called "Ramsay Hills", with Ramsay Street facing the threat of demolition.

== Storylines ==
Shane was born shortly after his parents Max and Maria Ramsay (Dasha Bláhová) move to Ramsay Street, and Shane became best friends with his next door neighbour, Paul Robinson. Shane enjoyed swimming and Max entered him into an Under-12s swimming team in the hope that Shane would make it to the Olympics one day. To Max's dismay, Shane's training regime is regularly interrupted by girls wanting to get a glimpse of him in his speedos. Shane falls for Daphne and they begin dating. Max is annoyed when Daphne moves in several doors down with Des as his lodger, as Daphne is a stripper. Shane and his younger brother Danny Ramsay (David Clencie) are involved in a head-on car crash with bank robber, Gordon Miller (Red Symons), which kills Gordon's accomplice and leaves Shane with a back injury that dashes all hopes of him competing in the Olympics. Shane tries to become an air steward like Paul but his injury prevents him from doing so.

Daphne and Shane break up when Daphne realises she loves Des. Shane then dates plumber, Terry, who works for Max. When Terry mentions that Gordon is her ex-husband, he is shocked and Gordon escapes prison and menaces Terry and Max but Shane is able to alert the police and he is returned to jail. Terry later marries Paul and Shane resumes his relationship with Daphne but once again, they break up and Daphne goes on to marry Des. Shane forms a gardening service with local doctor Clive Gibbons (Geoff Paine). Shane is worried when their first client, Beth Travers (Virginia Hey) begins showering him with gifts after he has sex with her. Beth later locks Shane in her wine cellar, but eventually releases him. Mike Young (Guy Pearce) asks Shane to coach him when he joins the school diving team and Shane takes a risk by diving for the first time since the crash. Shane then enrols in a business class and changes his life.

Following Max's departure to reconcile with Maria in Queensland, Shane's uncle Tom Ramsay (Gary Files), aunt Madge Mitchell (Anne Charleston) and her daughter Charlene Mitchell (Kylie Minogue) move in. Shane is involved in another car crash, which results in the death of Tom's friend, Jean. Shane is charged with manslaughter, but the charges are later dropped when a witness comes forward. Shane's cousin Henry Ramsay (Craig McLachlan) moves in after he is paroled following a three year prison sentence for robbery. Shane is hostile towards Henry, as he has prior form for theft, and begrudgingly shares his room with him. When Shane loses $100, he is quick to blame Henry, but forced to apologise when the money turns up. Shane then moves out of Number 24 and leaves to travel around Australia.

Shane returns to Erinsborough after 34 years and is celebrating with friends when he accidentally strikes Paul with a champagne cork. Paul invites Shane up to his penthouse, where he meets his son Leo Tanaka (Tim Kano). Shane meets up with Harold Bishop (Ian Smith) and Jane Harris (Annie Jones) in the local café. Jane and Shane reminisce about the time they got lost in the bush together. He then meets Paul's ex-wife, Terese Willis (Rebekah Elmaloglou), and his half-brother, Glen Donnelly (Richard Huggett). Shane later tells Paul that he wants to buy into Lassiters as a fair and equal partner, having made his fortune through cryptocurrency. Shane tells Jane about his plans and she says that going into business with Paul would be the worst decision he could make. Tim Collins (Ben Anderson) gives Shane information about Paul's scandals which prompts him to reconsider going into business with him. Shane requests to buy Paul out of his share of Lassiters, which Paul initially rejects but Lucy Robinson (Melissa Bell) attempts to secure the deal. After the deal is finalised, Shane sees a For Sale sign in front of his old house and calls Maria to tell her that he is considering buying. Shane meets Izzy Hoyland (Natalie Bassingthwaite) and they flirt, before kissing in Shane's car, but when Shane finds out she is already in a relationship, Izzy leaves. The pair later have sex in Shane's hotel room, after Izzy ends her relationship. When Paul decides to stay in Erinsborough, Shane agrees to rip up the Lassiters contract. He joins Jane and Mike Young at a party on Ramsay Street, where he remarks that he needs someone to take Number 24 off his hands. Mike later makes an offer on the house, matching the amount that Shane was going to pay. Shane tells Jane that he asked some old friends of hers to stop by; she greets Charlene and her husband Scott Robinson (Jason Donovan). As the party continues, Shane talks with Lucy, and Izzy later comes over to be with him.

In the 2025 final the whole street including past and present residents are now looking for a new home with the news that a freeway is being built through Ramsey Street. Paul Robinson and Shane Ramsey each come up with a new place Ramsey Hills and Robinson Towers. Before the closing scene Susan, Karl and Paul are stood on Ramsey Street where Susan says she wants to fight to save the street with Karl agreeing and Paul asking “what now” ending leaving it unknown what the outcome will be.

== Reception ==
For his portrayal of Shane Ramsay, O'Brien won the 'Most Popular New Talent' award at the 1986 Logie Awards The following year, O'Brien won the 'Most Popular Actor' award. Virgin Media branded the character as a retro soap hunk in a special feature reported on their website, stating: "Shane Ramsay in Neighbours possibly had the best mullet ever seen in soap history. But he was kind and was like an older brother but with the advantages of not being related." They also branded O'Brien as one of Neighbours most popular cast members in the history of the series for his portrayal of Shane. Lorna Cooper of MSN TV listed Shane as one of soap opera's "forgotten characters" and also brands him as Neighbours' "first major hunk".

Ruth Deller of television website Lowculture gave Shane a 3.5 out of 5 for his contribution to Neighbours, during a feature called "A guide to recognising your Ramsays and Robinsons". Deller said "The mullet-tastic Shane was the 'housewife's choice' back in the 80s, something that has served actor Peter O'Brien well over the years". She added "He was in love with Daphne (and for a while the actors playing them had a romance in real-life) and was heartbroken when she ended up with Des Clarke".

Telecommunications network Orange profiled past Neighbours characters, in this feature they joke about Shane's most memorable stating: "Being involved in a dramatic car crash, which shattered the talented diver’s dream of competing in the Olympics. Worse still, it meant soap fans never got to see Shane in his Speedos again. Sigh…" In her book "Soap opera", Dorothy Hobson describes Shane and his family as "more working class than other characters", also stating: "They had working-class jobs but were not represented as cloth cap wearing or dowdy, they were bright and modern and representative of a vibrant and working population." Andrew Mercado in his book Super Aussie Soaps brands the Ramsay family as being the backbone of the serial during the early years. Susannah Alexander from Digital Spy called Shane an "iconic character".
