= Daphne Clarke =

Fictional character from the Australian soap opera Neighbours

- Neighbours character
- Portrayed by: Elaine Smith
- Duration: 1985–1988
- First appearance: 18 March 1985
- Last appearance: 25 March 1988
- Created by: Reg Watson
- Introduced by: Reg Watson
In-universe information
- Other names: Daphne Lawrence
- Occupation: Stripper; Coffee shop owner
- Father: Allen Lawrence
- Mother: Tina Bentley
- Husband: Des Clarke (1986–1988)
- Sons: Jamie Clarke
- Grandfathers: Harry Henderson

Daphne Clarke (also Lawrence) is a fictional character from the Australian soap opera Neighbours, played by Elaine Smith. Daphne was created by Reg Watson as one of Neighbours' twelve original characters. The producer had originally wanted Rebecca Gibney to play the role, but she joined the cast of another television series. When Smith came in to audition for a guest part, her appearance, particularly her short haircut, caught the attention of the casting director, who had been looking for an "outrageous image" for the character of Daphne. Smith won the role and she made her on-screen debut in the soap's first episode, which was broadcast on 18 March 1985.

Daphne was portrayed as a smart, confident and independent woman from a good background. She sported a short haircut and bright clothing, which made her stand out from the other female characters on television at the time. Daphne was not embarrassed by her profession as a stripper and her "no-nonsense approach" to life made her an immediate favourite with the viewers. Daphne gave up stripping when her grandfather gave her the lease to the local coffee shop. She used her position to help customers with their problems and gained the trust of many of the teenage characters, particularly Mike Young (Guy Pearce).

Daphne's marriage to Des Clarke (Paul Keane) was central to many of her storylines. After a brief relationship with Shane Ramsay (Peter O'Brien) and two engagements, Daphne married Des in July 1986. She gave birth to their son, Jamie (S.J. Dey), in July 1987. That same year, Smith announced her departure from Neighbours. Not wanting to kill off a popular character, the producers sent Daphne to care for her dying father. However, viewers were not satisfied with this ending as it meant Des and Daphne would have to break up, so producers decided to conclude Daphne's storyline by killing her off in a car accident. Smith agreed to return to conclude her character's storyline after learning that a body double had been hired for Daphne's death scenes. She made her final appearance on 25 March 1988, becoming the first regular character to die on-screen.

== Creation and casting ==
Daphne is one of the twelve original characters conceived by the creator and then executive producer of Neighbours, Reg Watson. When it came to casting, Waston had initially wanted actress Rebecca Gibney to play the role. However, she joined the cast of children's television series Zoo Family instead. Elaine Smith had previously made several small appearances in various established television series. In 1984, she came in to Neighbours to audition for the guest role of Lorraine Kingham and her short, spiky haircut caught the attention of the casting director, who asked her to do a screen test for Daphne. Smith told Hilary Kingsley, author of Soap Box, "The casting director of Neighbours was looking some outrageous image for Daphne, this stripper – he didn't quite know what, but my haircut was it!" Smith revealed that the idea of playing a stripper amused her and quipped that Daphne was the only stripper who never had to take her clothes off.

== Development ==
=== Characterisation ===
The character of Daphne was introduced to Neighbours as a "saucy stripper with a heart of gold." In their 1989 book, The Neighbours Factfile, Neil Wallis and Dave Hogan wrote that Daphne came from a rich, but uncaring family. They were rarely mentioned on-screen, making her past somewhat of a mystery. Daphne had received a good education and worked in an office as a secretary, until she told her sexist boss to "jump in a lake." Daphne then chose to become a stripper rather than ask her mother, Tina (Beverley Dunn), for a loan. Of Daphne's profession as a stripper, Smith explained "The whole point of Daphne being a stripper is that she's completely counter to the black stockings and garters cliche. She's a bright girl from a good background who gets fed up with being ogled and pinched by men in her secretarial job and says, right I might as well make some money out of it."

With her spiky hair and bright clothing, Daphne stood out from other female characters on television at the time. She was portrayed as a strong, smart and independent woman. She was often shrewd and "a warm friend" to those around her. Tony Johnston, author of Neighbours: 20 years of Ramsay Street stated that Daphne had "an appealing mix of cheek, savvy and the-girl-next-door." She was a woman in charge of her own life, which helped her to become the serial's first "sweetheart." Smith told Kingsley that her favourite aspects of Daphne's personality were her confidence and stubborn streak. Smith also commented that Daphne wore "zanier clothes" than she did and was more outgoing. The fact that she embodied a "no-nonsense approach" to life and was not embarrassed by her profession as a stripper, meant Daphne became an immediate favourite with viewers.

The way she treated the serial's teenagers as adults also endeared her to the younger viewers. Daphne gave up her career as a stripper to run the coffee shop, which her grandfather Harry Henderson (Johnny Lockwood) gave to her, after he won it in a poker game. Kingsley commented that Daphne ran the business like "a pro". Daphne's position in the coffee shop meant that customers often confided in her and she helped mediate between several parents and their children. She also gained the trust and affection of the teenage characters, most notably Mike Young (Guy Pearce), whom she took under her wing, later becoming his legal guardian.

=== Marriage to Des Clarke ===
"Daphne was the sort of girl that Des never dreamed of dating. Aside from the fact that their two professions couldn't be more different, she was gutsy where he was shy, wore bright clothes where he wore grey, was outrageous where he was introverted and was capable when he was useless."

— Author Josephine Monroe on Daphne and Des.

The first episode of Neighbours saw Daphne hired to strip at Des Clarke's (Paul Keane) bucks party. When the night was interrupted by a neighbour, Daphne left some belongings behind and returned the following morning to collect them. After Des's fiancée called the wedding off, Daphne realised that Des needed a lodger to help him pay the mortgage off and moved in. Des was instantly attracted to Daphne, but he tried to hide his feelings and became awkward around her. Josephine Monroe, author of Neighbours: The First 10 Years, wrote that the local men queued up to date Daphne, but it was Shane Ramsay (Peter O'Brien) who first caught her eye and they soon began a relationship.

During Neighbours' first-season finale in 1985, Daphne broke up with Shane and proposed to Des, who accepted. However, on the day of their wedding, Daphne's bridal car was hijacked by a bank robber and she was late to the church. Having been stood up five times in the past, Des gave up waiting and left. The couple failed to sort out what had happened and their relationship ended. Daphne rekindled her romance with Shane and they became engaged, but Daphne became worried about rushing into marriage on the rebound and they eventually ended their engagement. Following advice and encouragement from his mother, Eileen (Myra De Groot), and friend, Clive (Geoff Paine), Des tried to "woo Daphne back."

In June 1986, Stephen Cook from TV Week announced that Daphne would accept a proposal from either Des or Shane, which would definitely result in her getting married. Smith told Cook "I don't know whether Daphne actually needs a man in her life but she's certainly got two men there. It's a triangle that's developed, but to try and give a rational explanation to it is next to impossible." Smith thought Daphne was ideal for Shane and that she had a great deal of love for him. On the other hand, Daphne also loved Des, who she trusted and had become good friends with. O'Brien stated that as far as Shane was concerned, Daphne was the only woman he ever loved and thought that he was more suited to her than Des. Keane commented that despite being engaged five times and stood up once by Daphne, Des had always loved her. He added "It was love at first sight for Des."

Cook later revealed that it was Des who would propose to and marry Daphne. The wedding episodes were broadcast in July and Cook quipped that from the moment Daphne moved into Ramsay Street, there had always been a feeling that she and Des would eventually marry. Despite Shane having once been Des's "rival in romance", he acted as best man. Cook added that the wedding, which saw most of the regular cast on-set, was "no small affair". A few months after the wedding, Daphne became pregnant. Her pregnancy lasted over the usual nine months and Smith explained that the producers had stretched it out for longer, so they could tie it into other storylines. Daphne and Des's son, Jamie (S.J. Dey), arrived in July 1987 and became the first baby to be born in Neighbours.

=== Departure ===
In June 1987, reporters for TV Week confirmed Smith would be leaving Neighbours after two and a half years. They had predicted her departure from the show four weeks prior, after news that she had not renewed her contract emerged. They also reported that representatives from Grundys were trying to negotiate with Smith to stay on for an extra six weeks to tie up an important storyline. Smith's departure came at "a crucial time" as her character was about to give birth. Smith did not immediately comment, while producer Phil East said she had "renegotiated her contract." Smith later told Nicola Murphy and David Brown from the publication that she actually made the decision to leave Neighbours in September, as there were a lot of things she wanted to do. She asked to be written out, as she felt that while Daphne had been "a bit of a challenge at first", she felt trapped by her persona. Smith also believed that the role no longer offered her variety and she did not want to stay to be bored, but comfortable.

As Daphne was one of Neighbours' most popular characters, the producers chose not to kill her off. Instead Daphne's father, Allen Lawrence (Neil Fitzpatrick), re-enters her life and admits that he is dying. Realising that she only has a short time to make her peace with him, Daphne takes Jamie with her to nurse Allen. Viewers were not satisfied with this ending for the character, especially as it meant Daphne and Des would have to break up, a situation that they would not accept. Smith agreed, pointing out that Daphne and Des had such a strong marriage that she would not walk out on him and their son. She said producers took the decision to kill off Daphne, which would lead to "challenging" future storylines for Keane and his character. Smith agreed with the decision, telling Robyn Harvey from The Sydney Morning Herald: "I wanted Daphne to die. I didn't want to be stuck in a television series for the rest of my life. I'd taken Daphne as far as she could go. She's run the gamut of every life experience she could possibly have. I'd had enough."

Smith agreed to return for a few days in early 1988 to finish off Daphne's storyline. Smith told Murphy (TV Week) that she would resume filming in February, but was not privy to the details of Daphne's final storyline because she had yet to see the scripts. According to Keane in a later interview, Smith requested to return in a dialogue-free capacity after learning that a body double had been hired for Daphne's death. While being interviewed two days after "intense and emotional filming", Smith explained that Daphne is critically injured during a car crash on the way home from her father's funeral. She is rushed to the hospital where she lapses into a coma. Smith spent her last two days of filming in a hospital bed with bandages around her head. Off-screen, representatives from the serial's production company tried to persuade Smith to sign a new contract, but she refused. Daphne briefly regains consciousness to say "I love you Clarkey" to Des, before becoming the first regular character to die on-screen. Smith called the scene "very emotional" and praised Keane for his performance. Smith did not regret her character being killed off, adding "Daphne's death was more shocking than I thought it would be but I'm glad they've completed the storyline."

== Storylines ==
Daphne is hired to perform at Des Clarke's buck's party in Ramsay Street. She returns the following morning to collect her watch and emerges from the bedroom when Des's fiancée, Lorraine Kingham (Antoinette Byron), arrives with her parents to call off the wedding. Daphne comforts Des and helps clean up his house. Shane Ramsay, who hired Daphne for the party, flirts with her and asks her to watch him train at the pool some day. He tells her that he wants to see her again and she agrees to go to dinner with him. Daphne decides to move into Number 28 with Des to help him pay off the mortgage. Daphne becomes good friends with Des and she begins dating Shane. Daphne falls in love with Des and after breaking up with Shane, she proposes to him and he accepts. On the day of their wedding, Daphne's car is hijacked by a bank robber dressed in a gorilla suit and she is late to the church. Des assumes that Daphne has changed her mind and he leaves. After failing to sort out what happened, Daphne moves out, while Des's ex-girlfriend, Andrea Townsend (Gina Gaigalas), turns up and claims that Des is the father of her son, Bradley (Bradley Kilpatrick). Daphne rents a room from Clive Gibbons at Number 22 and her best friend, Zoe Davis (Ally Fowler), also moves in.

Daphne's grandfather, Harry gives her the lease to the local coffee shop and she gives up her career as a stripper. She renames the business 'Daphne's' and despite an initial struggle, the coffee shop soon begins making a profit. Daphne gets back together with Shane and they become engaged, but she starts to have doubts about whether she is moving on too quickly. When Des learns that he is not Bradley's father, he tries to win Daphne back. Shane becomes jealous of Daphne and Des's friendship and when he verbally attacks them, Daphne breaks up with him. She gets back together with Des and they eventually marry. Daphne and Des become Mike Young's legal guardians when they learn that he comes from a violent home. Daphne helps Mike when he is banned from seeing Jane Harris (Annie Jones) by her grandmother, Mrs. Mangel (Vivean Gray). Daphne soon discovers that Sue Parker (Kate Gorman) has been sending poison pen letters about Mike to Mrs. Mangel and exposes her. Daphne contracts meningitis, but she recovers and then learns that she is pregnant. Daphne and Des's marriage becomes strained when she learns that he has been in contact with Lorraine. The couple eventually talk and Des explains that he had just given Lorraine some financial advice.

Mrs. Mangel offers to help Daphne paint the nursery and she is knocked off a ladder by Mike's pet Labrador, Bouncer, and suffers amnesia. Mrs. Mangel threatens to sue and Des decides to settle out of court, so that Daphne does not become stressed. But when Daphne learns what Des has done, she is angry with him for keeping it from her. During a picnic, Daphne goes into labour and Beverly Marshall (Lisa Armytage) delivers her son, Jamie. Daphne briefly suffers from postnatal depression following Jamie's birth. During Jamie's christening, Daphne's mother, Tina, turns up. She and Daphne sit down and talk through their problems and part on speaking terms. Shortly after, Daphne learns that her father is dying. Des persuades her to make things right with Allen. Daphne then decides to nurse her father and she takes Jamie to stay with him. Months later, Gail Robinson (Fiona Corke) offers to drive Daphne and Jamie back to Ramsay Street after Allen's funeral. During the journey, they are involved in a car crash, which leaves Daphne in a coma. Des stays by her side and is holding her hand when she briefly wakes up to tell him that she loves him. Daphne then suffers a cardiac arrest and dies.

== Reception ==
For her portrayal of Daphne, Smith received a nomination for the Logie Award for Most Popular Actress in 1987. Josephine Monroe, author of Neighbours: The First 10 Years, stated that Daphne became one of the most popular and colourful characters to have been in Neighbours. While reviewing the show's early episodes, Newsday's Terry Kelleher thought Daphne was "surprisingly wholesome for a stripteaser, preferring housecleaning to home-wrecking." A writer for the BBC's Neighbours website thought Daphne's most notable moment was "Going into labour with Jamie at a riverside picnic."

Claudia Pattison from mobile network operator Orange branded Des and Daphne one of the most popular couples in the serial's history, while a Virgin Media writer thought that they had "one of soapland's happiest marriages". The Sydney Morning Herald's Michael Idato called them Neighbours' first supercouple. Mary Fletcher from Inside Soap commented that Des and Daphne's troubled romance was "one of Neighbours' best storylines." The couple's wedding gained a lot of attention in the UK and Terry Wogan even discussed the episode with Rolf Harris on his talk show the day after it aired. A Herald Sun reporter included Daphne and Des' wedding and Daphne's death in their "Neighbours' 30 most memorable moments" feature.

Tim Teeman and James Jackson from The Times named Daphne's death as one of their top 15 most memorable Neighbours moments. They commented "Like, was that her in the bed or an actress with a Daphne wig? The romance of Des and Daphne (Mr Ordinary and the ex-stripper) was an early Neighbours classic so we felt this one hard". A Herald Sun reporter also included Daphne's death in their list of top ten Neighbours moments. The reporter wrote that Daphne was a popular character during the serial's peak in 1988 and called Des "her soulmate". They added that her death was watched by millions of viewers in Australia and the UK.

Sarah Megginson from SheKnows placed Daphne's death at number three in her feature on the eight most memorable Neighbours moments. She called the relationship between Daphne and Des "one of the series' classic romances." She added "The couple were the first to tie the knot on the show, so when Daphne was fatally hit by a car, Des – and the Neighbours viewing audience across Australia and the UK – was suitably devastated. A columnist from NOW said that the moment Daphne dies was "a tear-jerking moment." Daphne was placed at number thirty-five on the Huffpost's "35 greatest Neighbours characters of all time" feature. Journalist Adam Beresford branded her the "stripper with a heart of gold Daph."
