= Des Clarke (Neighbours) =

Fictional character in the soap opera Neighbours

- Neighbours character
- Portrayed by: Paul Keane
- Duration: 1985–1990, 2015, 2020–2022
- First appearance: 18 March 1985
- Last appearance: 28 July 2022
- Created by: Reg Watson
- Introduced by: Reg Watson (1985); Jason Herbison (2015)
In-universe information
- Occupation: Bank manager Co-owner of Daphne's
- Father: Malcolm Clarke
- Mother: Eileen Clarke
- Half-sisters: Sally Wells
- Wife: Daphne Clarke (1986–1988); Fiona (1991–; divorced, 2017–; divorced)
- Sons: Jamie Clarke
- First cousins: Sarah Richards

Des Clarke is a fictional character from the Australian soap opera Neighbours, played by Paul Keane. Des was created by Reg Watson as one of Neighbours' twelve original characters. He made his first on screen appearance on 18 March 1985, the show's first episode. Des departed during the episode broadcast on 11 October 1990. Keane later reprised the role as part of Neighbours' 30th anniversary celebrations in March 2015. He also returned for the 35th anniversary on 18 March 2020, again in August and December 2020 and for the serial's final episodes in 2022.

== Creation and casting ==
Des is one of the twelve original characters conceived by the creator and then executive producer of Neighbours, Reg Watson. Actor Stefan Dennis originally auditioned for the role, before he was cast as Paul Robinson. Paul Keane was then cast in the role. Keane suffered with depression and anxiety, and was happy when Channel Seven cancelled the show. He explained "Neighbours was my first job. I couldn't believe how hard it was. I was exhausted. When it ended at Channel Seven I thought, 'Thank God, I can go home.' But then Ten picked it up. I was devastated."

In 1990, after running his course, Des was written out of Neighbours. Off-screen, Keane struggled with his sudden fame and had developed a problem with drugs. He later stopped working in the acting industry.

== Development ==
=== Marriage to Daphne Lawrence ===
The first episode of Neighbours saw many of the male characters attending Des's bucks night, ahead of his wedding to Lorraine Kingham (Antoinette Byron). The party is where Des first met Daphne Lawrence (Elaine Smith), who was hired to perform a striptease routine. When Lorraine called off the wedding the following day, Daphne moved in to help Des pay off the mortgage. Des was immediately attracted to Daphne, but he tried to hide his feelings for her, resulting in him becoming awkward around her. Daphne soon began dating Des's friend Shane Ramsay (Peter O'Brien). By the end of 1985, Daphne had broken up with Shane and proposed to Des, who accepted. However, on the day of their wedding, Daphne's bridal car was hijacked by a bank robber and she was late. Having been stood up five times in the past, Des gave up waiting and left the church. Their relationship ended when they failed to sort out exactly what had happened. Daphne later got engaged to Shane, while Des's mother, Eileen (Myra De Groot), and friend, Clive (Geoff Paine), persuaded him to "woo Daphne back."

In June 1986, Stephen Cook from TV Week reported that Daphne would accept a proposal from either Des or Shane, which would definitely result in her getting married. Smith told Cook that she thought Daphne was ideal for Shane, but she loved Des too, as she trusted him and they had become good friends. O'Brien thought Shane was more suited to Daphne and did not see Des as a threat. While Keane commented, "Des has been engaged five times in his life – and stood up once by Daphne! – but he's always loved Daph. It was love at first sight for Des." Cook later revealed that it was Des who would propose to Daphne and the couple eventually married. The wedding episodes were broadcast in July and Cook noted that from the moment Daphne met Des, there was always a feeling that they would marry. Despite Shane being Des's "rival in romance", he acted as his best man. A few months after the wedding, Daphne became pregnant and she gave birth to a son, who she and Des named Jamie (S.J. Dey).

In 1987, Smith decided to leave Neighbours. She and the producers agreed that viewers would not accept a break-up between Des and Daphne, so they killed the character off. Daphne was left in a coma following a car crash, before she became the first regular character to die.

=== Relationship with Jane Harris ===
A year after Daphne's death, Des began dating neighbour Jane Harris (Annie Jones). Des was initially reluctant to commit to the relationship, due to his grief for Daphne, and Jones said that their friends believed Des was so attached to Daphne's memory that he was nowhere near to breaking the bond. During a dinner to discuss Mike Young (Guy Pearce), Des was drawn to Jane. Describing the night, Jones said "The dinner is the first time for a long time that Des has really spoken to Jane. She thinks a relationship with Des is on again and is really upset when she finds out that wasn't his intention in inviting her out to dinner." While leaving the restaurant, Jane was almost hit by a car, which made Des realise how strong his feelings for her were.

Des then proposed to Jane and she accepted. Jones told TV Week's Darren Devlyn that the proposal was "a big shock" to everyone, but most of them were happy about it. One person who was not pleased about the engagement was Mike, who previously dated Jane. He initially believed that Jane wanted to get back together with him, until he heard the news. Jones said it was great that Des was over his mourning and thought it would be interesting to see how Jane coped with Des's son Jamie. Keane also agreed that the engagement was good for his character, saying "It's about time Des collected his thought and emotions and got on with life." Jane and Des get engaged, but the wedding is called off when Jane makes "a mercy dash" overseas. This marked Jones' departure from the series.

In February 1990, David Brown of TV Week reported that Keane had planned to quit Neighbours the previous month, however, he had taken an "unexpected" four-month break instead. Brown confirmed that Keane would return to set in April. Due to Keane's sudden break, scriptwriters had to carry out a number of last minute rewrites. Producer Tony MacDonald told Brown that they were treating Keane's departure as "a rest" for both him and his character. He stated "Paul has been with Neighbours since day one, so it was inevitable that he would take a break at some time. He will be back." He added that while ongoing storyline had to be changed, the break would give the writers a chance to give Des some good storylines on his return. However, he would not return to the show until almost 25 years later (see below).

=== Returns ===
Des as he appeared in 2020.

On 28 November 2014, it was announced that Keane had reprised his role for the serial's 30th anniversary celebrations. Stefan Dennis told Sarah Ellis of Inside Soap that bringing Keane back was one of his ideas and the producers ran with it. Keane was surprised to receive the call from producers and was initially unaware that Neighbours was turning 30. He explained, "I had a few reservations – I'm a Sydney boy, and the Neighbours studios in Melbourne are a long way away. But once I found out I'd be working with Stefan, it was like, 'What the hell! You only live once!'." Keane was also "fearful" about returning, but the experience helped bring him peace and he commented "I had so much fun this time."

Des returned on 17 March 2015. His visit coincides with the Erinsborough Festival and it initially appears that he is in town to catch up with Paul. However, it soon emerges that Paul wants Des to help him break up his nephew Daniel's (Tim Phillipps) wedding to Amber Turner (Jenna Rosenow). Keane told Ellis that Paul knew Des had experienced a troubled love life while he lived in Ramsay Street, and he wanted to use that to talk Daniel out of marriage. Dennis commented, "Paul's shrewd like that – it's very conniving of him."

On 24 November 2019, Neighbours confirmed that Keane would reprise the role for the serial's 35th anniversary in March 2020. He returned again in August 2020, as Des is called back to Erinsborough to talk with Jane about their relationship. Keane reprised his role for the serial's final episode, broadcast on 28 July 2022.

== Storylines ==
=== 1985–1990 ===
Des works at the Pacific Bank. He briefly dates colleague Julie Robinson (Vikki Blanche) but it does not last long. Des then dates Julie's friend Lorraine Kingham and they become engaged. They buy Number 28, the house next door to Julie and her family. The wedding is cancelled after Lorraine has doubts after a conversation with Julie. Lorraine is unimpressed to learn that Daphne Lawrence, the stripper from Des's buck's party is moving in to help him pay off the mortgage and has the furniture repossessed. Daphne buys some new furniture and Des is grateful. Des falls for Daphne but she prefers Des's friend Shane Ramsay. After Shane and Daphne's relationship breaks up, Des and Daphne are drawn together and Daphne proposes and Des accepts. They have numerous false starts during the engagement including Daphne being kidnapped, Des' ex-girlfriend Andrea Townsend (Gina Gaigalas) claiming Des is the father of her son Bradley (Bradley Kilpatrick) and Shane trying to win Daphne back. Des and Daphne finally marry in spite of all the problems, with their friends and neighbours present.

Des and Daphne foster Mike Young after his abusive father David (Stewart Faichney) begins beating him and his mother Barbara (Rona McLeod) and they form a family unit. Daphne later becomes pregnant and gives birth to a son, Jamie. Daphne reconnects with her estranged father Allen (Neil Fitzpatrick) and learns he is dying and takes Jamie with her to nurse him during his final days. Sally Wells (Rowena Mohr) arrives in Erinsborough looking for Des and explains she is his half-sister, the product of a relationship their father Malcolm (Noel Trevarthen) had after leaving Des and his mother Eileen. Des and Sally bond and track down Malcolm, who has been living in Erinsborough for many years.

Des is delighted when Daphne tells him she will be returning home after Allen's funeral, but she and Gail Robinson (Fiona Corke) are involved in a car crash. Gail and Jamie are fine but Daphne is left comatose for several weeks. Daphne wakes up briefly to tell Des she loves him before going into cardiac arrest and dying. Des is devastated and struggles to raise Jamie alone and matters are not helped when Mike's University studies take up a lot of his time and Eileen and Sally relocate to England. He decides to advertise for a nanny and Bronwyn Davies (Rachel Friend) answers the call, much to Des' surprises as she had earlier admonished him for losing Jamie in a supermarket. They call a truce and Des invites her to move in.

Des begins dating again and has a brief romance with Penelope Porter (Nicki Wendt), but the relationship breaks down after Penny admits she has been dating someone else. Des begins dating Jane Harris, despite having reservations about the age gap between them and the fact she used to be in a relationship with Mike. The relationship causes friction with Mike and he leaves to stay with his mother for a while. Des and Jane get engaged, which upsets Mike who plans to move out but the three of them sort out their differences. The engagement collapses when Jane leaves for England to tend to her grandmother Nell Mangel (Vivian Grey) who has suffered a heart attack. Jane stays in England calls off the wedding.

Des tries to change his image and become more active with his life. Melanie Pearson (Lucinda Cowden) helps him to get a more challenging job by embellishing his CV. On an outdoor pursuit weekend, Des nearly falls off a cliff. However, his boss, Geoff Sinclair (Rod Densley) keeps him on at the firm and sends him on a business trip to Perth. After Des returns, he puts the house up for sale and announces that he is moving to Perth after meeting a new partner, Fiona, a fellow widow with children of her own. Des sells Number 28 to the Willis family and moves into a flat before leaving. Des and Fiona's marriage does not last long and he and Jamie move to Adelaide, where Des suffers a nervous breakdown and is hospitalised and Jamie is forced go into care. They are reunited when Jamie runs away to Erinsborough and Harold Bishop (Ian Smith) helps locate Des with the help of his Salvation Army contacts.

=== 2015–2022 ===
Twenty-five years after his departure, Des returns to Erinsborough at Paul's invitation. He meets Paul's nephew Daniel and Paul gets Des to talk about his failed wedding to Lorraine, in order to put Daniel off from marrying his fiancée Amber Turner. After Daniel realises what Paul is doing, Des comments that Daniel seems to be genuinely in love with Amber. Des has a look round the Erinsborough Festival, before returning to catch up with Paul. He then returns to Adelaide. Three years later, Jane tells Paul that she has been keeping in touch with Des, who has since remarried Fiona and moved back to Perth. However, Des and Fiona split again and Jane flies out to Perth to comfort him.

Des returns to Erinsborough after being invited by Paul, who informs him about Jane's run of bad luck and Des admits he was falling for Jane again during her visit to Perth. Des attends Mark Brennan (Scott McGregor) and Paige Smith's (Olympia Valance) wedding ceremony at Lassiter's where he runs into Jane who is surprised to see him. When Jane finds out Paul has invited Des, she is furious and walks away. The Wedding Expo display collapses on Des injuring him and he is rushed to hospital. Des has only minor injuries and decides to leave but Jane catches up with him and they talk things through. Des then proposes and Jane accepts. Des visits his old house and thanks Susan Kennedy (Jackie Woodburne) for finding the shares Daphne left under the carpet for Jamie, leading them to reconnect. Des and Jane's ceremony is officiated by Paul and the couple leave agreeing to split their time between Perth and London.

When Jane returns several months later, she reveals she and Des have split and he has moved back to Perth. Des returns to Erinsborough and Jane assumes Paul has called him but Jane's daughter, Nicolette Stone (Charlotte Chimes) tells her she is the one who called Des, wanting to put things right after she pointed out the flaws in their relationship when she visited them in Perth. Des and Jane talk and agree to be friends and Des leaves again. A few months later, Des returns when Sheila Canning (Colette Mann) contacts him and tells him Jane is interested in him. Des goes to find Jane only to find her with Clive Gibbons, the three work out that Sheila has set this up to drive a wedge between Clive and Jane, who have recently begun dating, and they confront her at Lassiter's. Des calls Sheila selfish and she has a heart attack mid-argument and is rushed to hospital. Des apologises for losing his temper and feels guilty. When Sheila recovers, she asks Des to stage a fake date with her to make Clive jealous in a bid to win him but it backfires, resulting in ill-feeling between Des, Clive and Jane. Sheila apologises and is able to mend things by giving Clive and Jane her blessing and telling the three of them not to throw away a friendship. Following this, Des returns to Perth.

Des returns the following year for a visit upon learning that his old friends are in town. He has drinks with Paul, Mike, Jane, Clive, Harold and Mike's daughter Sam Young (Henrietta Graham). Des later attends Toadfish Rebecchi (Ryan Moloney) and Melanie's wedding party on Ramsay Street.

== Reception ==
Barbara Hooks, television critic for The Age, was critical of the character's personality, saying he was "about as charismatic as a Besser brick". Tony Squires from The Sydney Morning Herald admitted the character was a personal favourite of his, but found Des' luck with women to be "as bizarre as any Peyton Place plotline", as he was "an incredibly average man with the proverbial face of a knee". Squires later said that Des should have been made a more centralised character in the show, following multiple cast departures. He branded Des a "classically over-the-top character" but was "as plain as Barrie Unsworth". He opined that "Des isn't an attractive man" and compared his "turned up collar and side-burns" look to that of Elvis Presley. Squires suggested that Des should be featured more alongside Joe Mangel (Mark Little) because they have that "something".

An Inside Soap writer included Des in a feature on "soap wimps", characters who lack common sense and sex appeal. They wrote: "Des was truly remarkable. How someone so ineffectual ever became a bank manager was always worrying – no-one in their right mind could trust him with their life savings!" The writer likened Des to a robot because his movements were so clumsy, and thought his overbearing mother was responsible for his "inability to cope with things himself." Another writer from the publication said Des was a "boring banker" and a "jug-eared dullard". They included Des and Jane in their feature on unlikely relationships, adding that even they realised their romance was "very silly".

Kate Jackson and Sara Wallis from the Daily Mirror branded Des "jug-eared" and a "lovable bank manager". Claudia Pattison from mobile network operator Orange described Des as a "jug-eared Mr Nice" and stated he was one half of the serial's most popular couples. The Sydney Morning Herald's Michael Idato called Des and Daphne Neighbours' first supercouple. Mary Fletcher from Inside Soap commented that Des and Daphne's troubled romance was "one of Neighbours' best storylines."

To celebrate Neighbours' 25th anniversary, a writer for British satellite broadcasting company Sky included Des in their feature on the twenty-five characters who they believed were the most memorable in the series' history. Describing him they state: "Say Des, think Daphne. You can't be a happy couple in a soap for long, and the Clarkes were no different, as Daphne was mowed down by a car in 1988. You also can't be single in a soap for long, either, so it was only a matter of time before Des saw Jane, the ex-girlfriend of his adoptive son Mike 'Guy "out of Memento" Pearce' Young. He left for a new life with a fellow widow, but misery continued to haunt him even off screen: his son Jamie briefly appeared in 2003, with Des apparently having suffered depression and putting his son into care."

In March 2015, an Inside Soap columnist chose Des's return as one of their "5 of the best from Tuesday night's soaps!", commenting "There's a real blast from the past in Neighbours tonight, as Des Clarke arrives back in town. It's been 25 years since he was last on our screens, so you may not recognise him nowadays." A Herald Sun reporter included Des and Daphne's wedding and Des's 2015 return in their "Neighbours' 30 most memorable moments" feature.
