= Paul Keane =

Australian actor

- Born: Paul Keane; 16 September 1957 (age 68)
- Occupation: Television actor
- Years active: 1983–1990, 2015–2022

Paul Keane is an Australian actor well known for playing original character Des Clarke in the soap opera Neighbours, opposite Elaine Smith who played his wife Daphne Clarke. Other TV credits include Bliss and Flight into Hell.

Keane trained at the National Institute of Dramatic Art, graduating in 1983. After leaving Neighbours, Keane appeared in three short films before he quit acting and took up work in a pub. After struggling to cope with fame, Keane developed a drug addiction which he battled for ten years.

In November 2014, it was announced that Keane would be one of the former cast members returning to Neighbours, reprising his role of Des Clarke for the show's 30th anniversary in 2015. Keane also appeared in a documentary special celebrating the anniversary titled Neighbours 30th: The Stars Reunite, which aired in Australia and the UK in March 2015.

Keane reprised the role of Des when the character returned for Neighbours 35th anniversary in March and December 2020 and again for the final episode of the show in July 2022.
