= Elaine Smith (actress) =

Australian actress

- Born: 23 April 1962 (age 64); Largs, North Ayrshire, Scotland
- Occupation: Television actress
- Notable work: Daphne Clarke in Neighbours
- Spouse: Jonathan Biggins
- Children: 2

Elaine Smith (born 23 April 1962) is a Scottish-Australian former actress, known for her role as Daphne Clarke in the Australian soap opera Neighbours from 1985 until 1988.

== Early life ==
Smith was born in Largs, Scotland. Her family moved to Perth, Western Australia when she was young.

== Career ==
Smith auditioned for a guest role in new series Neighbours in 1984. However her appearance, particularly her short spiky hair, caught the attention of the casting director and she was cast as regular character Daphne Lawrence. Smith continued in the role until 1988. Prior to this she had a small guest role in soap opera Sons and Daughters in 1984 as a flight attendant.

After leaving Neighbours, Smith guested as Jenny Rose in an episode of The Flying Doctors. She starred in the 1991 miniseries Ratbag Hero as Mum, alongside Cameron Nugent and Marcus Graham. In 1992, Smith joined the main cast of the revamped Flying Doctors series R.F.D.S. as Dr Sissy Wetherall. Subsequent credits include State Coroner, Always Greener, and Home and Away. She made two guest appearances in All Saints in August 2005 and March 2006.

Smith later earned a teaching degree and became a Year 3 teacher at a Sydney primary school. In 2025, Smith revealed that she had declined offers from Neighbours producers to either return as a ghost or a twin. She decided to retire from acting and is a private tutor for neurodiverse children.

== Personal life ==
Smith was in a relationship with her Neighbours co-star Peter O'Brien.

She is married to actor and writer, Jonathan Biggins. The couple met while performing together in a Melbourne play. Smith and Biggins have twin daughters, who were born in February 2000.

== Filmography ==
=== Film ===
Year	Film	Role	Type
1972	The Office Picnic		Feature film
1983	The City's Edge	Extra	Feature film
1984	Every Picture Tells a Story: The Art Films Of James Scott	Female Striker	Feature film documentary, UK

=== Television ===
Year	Title	Role	Type
1984	Sons and Daughters	Air Stewardess	Guest role
1984	Carson's Law	Angela Watson	Episodes: "La Cenicienta", "All Is Fair"
1985–1988	Neighbours	Daphne Clarke	Regular role
1986–1987	It's a Knockout	Guest referee / Participant	2 episodes
1988	The Flying Doctors	Jenny Rose	Episode: "Preacher Man"
1988	Hey Hey It's Saturday	Herself	1 episode (Red Faces segment)
1989	A Country Practice	Helen Grey	Episodes: "Sanctuary: Parts 1 & 2"
1990	Flair	Megan	Recurring role
1990	The Paper Man	Celia Ward	Episodes: "Looking at the Stars", "Every Post a Winner"
1991	Ratbag Hero	Mum	Recurring role
1993	Bay City		Regular role
1993	Time Trax	Claudine Baker	Episode: "Night of the Savage"
1993	R.F.D.S.	Dr. Sissy Wetherall	Regular role
1995	G.P.	Wendy Dowling	Episode: "Grown Ups"
1996	The Adventures of the Bush Patrol	Voice	Animated TV series
1996–1998	State Coroner	Dr. Julie Travers	Regular role
1998	Bullpitt!	Journalist	Episode: "Too Many Teds"
1999	Hububb	Rosa	Episode: "No Go Pogo"
2001	Wicked!	Eileen	Regular role
2002	Always Greener	Mrs. Slate	Episode: "Cliffhanger"
2005, 2006	All Saints	Joanne Miller	Episodes: "Immortal", "No Way Out"
2006	Home and Away	Grace Carter	Episode 4266
