= Terry Inglis =

- Neighbours character
- Portrayed by: Maxine Klibingaitis
- First appearance: 11 June 1985
- Last appearance: 5 November 1985
- Created by: Reg Watson
- Introduced by: Reg Watson
In-universe information
- Occupation: Plumber's assistant
- Family: Robinson
- Husband: Gordon Miller (until 1985); Paul Robinson (1985–86)

Terry Inglis (also Robinson) is a fictional character from the Australian soap opera Neighbours played by Maxine Klibingaitis.

She made her first appearance on 11 June 1985. Terry is employed by Max Ramsay (Francis Bell) as his plumber's apprentice. Terry dates Shane Ramsay (Peter O'Brien) and Paul Robinson (Stefan Dennis), whom she later marries. Terry kills Charles Durham (Ross Thompson) and later shoots Paul when he goes to report her to the police. The character departed on 5 November 1985. She is arrested for Charles' murder off-screen and she later dies by suicide, becoming the only character from the serial to have died this way.

== Development ==
Klibingaitis's casting as Terry was confirmed in the 1 June 1985 issue of TV Week. At the time, Klibingaitis was well known for her role as Bobbie Mitchell in Prisoner, which she left in September 1984. She admitted that it was a hard decision to accept a role in another long-running series, saying "I decided I may as well take the work that is there than wait around for the work that might never be. The character is so different to Bobbie." Klibingaitis was grateful to producer John Holmes for casting her as a character closer in age to herself. She had previously played two teenage characters despite being in her twenties.

Terry, which is short for Theresa, becomes Max Ramsay's (Francis Bell) apprentice plumber. She is introduced after Max loses his licence and decides to hire an apprentice that can drive. Klibingaitis told Jenny Cooney that Max's wife contacts CES about the job and she initially believes the apprentice is a boy, so Max "gets a bit of a shock" when Terry shows up for work. Of her character's job, Klibingaitis stated "I left Prisoner where I was an electrician and I've gone into Neighbours as a plumber. I'm learning a lot about the trades." Klibingaitis was pleased that Terry was different to her Prisoner character Bobbie. She explained that Terry wears her hair under a cap when she is working, but wears it "in a very feminine way" when she goes out to socialise. She is not as tough as Bobbie, who Klibingaitis described as a "sort of a hit-and-miss punk". Terry was described as "boyish" by Coral O'Connor of the Daily Mirror. The role led to a reunion between Klibingaitis and her Prisoner co-star Kylie Foster, who joined the Neighbours cast as teenager Wendy Gibson. Foster said the actors' only regret was that their characters did not like each other. Foster explained: "Terry is 21 and mature but doesn't act it and Wendy is struggling to be mature and can't understand why Terry doesn't take advantage of being older." She added that Wendy resents the attention Terry receives.

Terry initially hides the fact she is married to and trying to divorce bank robber, Gordon Miller (Red Symons). Cooney reported that revelations about Terry's "marital crisis send shock waves through the street". Later on, to Max's "fury" a relationship develops between Terry and his son Shane Ramsay (Peter O'Brien). Klibingaitis stated that Max gets possessive over Shane and attempts to sack Terry, but they eventually work things out. Klibingaitis added that her character finds Max "very amusing and sends him up all the time."

Terry later dates Paul Robinson (Stefan Dennis), but their relationship does not begin well as she is still in love with Shane, who is now dating her best friend Daphne Lawrence (Elaine Smith). Paul and Terry later get engaged. Terry decides to go ahead with the wedding, despite being confused about her feelings for Shane. A writer for TV Radio Extra observed Terry and Paul's wedding was "a more civilised affair" than Stephen Morrell and Jenny Turner's wedding in Sons and Daughters that aired in the same week, but it was "still not the kind of wedding day everyone dreams about". Paul is late, while Terry spends the ceremony and the reception looking "cow-eyed" at Shane. At the time the episodes aired in September 1985, production on the serial had been "discontinued", but it continued screening in Adelaide until the end of the year. Terry later tries to trick Paul out of his money and she shoots him. Their relationship ended in "heartache, attempted murder and inevitable divorce." Terry is sent to prison and the BBC said Terry "suffered in the long run." Terry takes her own life off screen in 1986 and was the only character to have died this way.

== Storylines ==
Maria Ramsay (Dasha Blahova) is charged with the task of hiring a plumber's assistant for her husband, Max, and Terry shows up for an interview. Terry is keen to prove that she can do the job as well as any man. Maria supports her and gives Terry the job. Max assumes that his wife had hired a man when he hears Terry's name and is shocked to find out that Terry is a woman. Max tells her that he will not hire her, but Terry tells him that she had completed three years at a Technical College. She then threatens Max with the Anti-Discrimination Board and Max gives her a trial run. Max deliberately sets out to make life as difficult as possible for Terry by giving her the hardest jobs, but Terry proves to be a great plumber. Max eventually admits that Terry is the best person for the job.

Terry falls for Max's son, Shane and they begin dating. Terry tells Shane that she was married to Gordon Miller, who caused a car accident that Shane was involved in. Gordon escapes from prison and holds Terry and Max hostage. However, Shane saves the day and Miller goes back to prison. Terry and Shane later split and Terry goes on a date with Shane's friend, Paul Robinson. Paul eventually proposes to Terry and they become engaged. Terry asks Paul's older sister, Julie (Vikki Blanche), to be her bridesmaid. Paul and Terry are married in the Robinson house within a month and Paul's father, Jim (Alan Dale), rents Number 30 for the couple.

However, Terry's criminal past finally catches up with her. A mysterious man, Charles Durham (Ross Thompson), shows up in Erinsborough, searching for a tape Terry had made of him boasting about his crimes. Paul's younger sister, Lucy (Kylie Flinker), accidentally loses the tape and Terry's life becomes threatened by Charles. Fearful of what would happen to her, Terry goes over to Charles' house to confront him. An argument breaks out, which results in Terry shooting Charles dead. Terry flees his house in shock and Daphne Lawrence finds Charles' body when she comes looking for Terry. Daphne gets blood on her skirt and she flees the house to look for Terry. Charles' accomplice Barbara Hill (Louise Le Nay) is watching Daphne and she reports her to the police instead.

Terry suggests to Paul that they move away, to which Paul agrees. When they attend Sarah Richards' (Julia MacDougall) party, they find Daphne is absent. When she does eventually show up, she is keen to get Terry alone and confront her, but getting Terry alone proves difficult. Lucy notices the blood on Daphne's skirt and the police arrive following the tip off from Barbara. The police interview everyone and Paul tells them that Charles had been threatening Terry. Paul is also unable to provide an alibi for Terry. While the police are interviewing Terry, Paul picks up her bag and the gun she shot Charles with falls out. Paul confronts Terry and she initially tries to dismiss Paul's suspicions. However, Paul goes to report Terry to the police and she grabs the gun and shoots him in the shoulder. She then flees Ramsay Street, leaving Paul for dead. The police catch up with Terry and she is jailed for murder. Terry sends Paul a letter asking him to visit her, which he declines. Terry then commits suicide in prison.

== Reception ==
Terry's off-screen suicide was called "one of Neighbours' most controversial ever storylines" by Ruth Deller of television website Lowculture. In 1985, Grundy Television had insisted that Neighbours was not going to be melodramatic, but falling ratings led the writers to try and increase viewership by having Terry shoot both Charles and Paul. Author of Super Aussie soaps, Andrew Mercado said this move followed one of soap's great traditions of including gunfire when ratings were low. During a feature on Paul Robinson and his many wives and girlfriends, The Sydney Morning Herald said "Remember the tears when Paul's whirlwind romance with plumber's assistant Terry Inglis ended in her shooting him, then shooting through?" The BBC said Terry's most notable moment was "Trying to shoot Paul Robinson."
