= Max Ramsay =

Fictional character from Neighbours

- Neighbours character
- Portrayed by: Francis Bell
- Duration: 1985–1986
- First appearance: 18 March 1985
- Last appearance: 2 May 1986
- Created by: Reg Watson
- Introduced by: Reg Watson
In-universe information
- Occupation: Plumber
- Family: Ramsay
- Father: Dan Ramsay
- Mother: Edna Ramsay
- Brothers: Tom Ramsay
- Sisters: Madge Bishop
- Wife: Maria Ramsay
- Sons: Shane Ramsay
- Daughters: Jill Ramsay
- Adoptive sons: Danny Ramsay
- Grandsons: Harry Ramsay; Max Ramsay
- Granddaughters: Kate Ramsay; Sophie Ramsay; Saskia Ramsay
- Grandfathers: Jack Ramsay
- Nieces: Charlene Robinson

Max Ramsay is a fictional character in the Australian television soap opera Neighbours, played by Francis Bell. Reg Watson created Max as one of the serial's twelve original characters. New Zealand actor Bell had wanted to appear in a major role in a long-running series for a while when he was cast as the head of the Ramsay family. He liked the serial's focus on ordinary people, and the comedy and drama of everyday life. Bell made his debut as Max in the show's first episode, which was broadcast on 18 March 1985. Max is portrayed as a rough, domineering, hard-headed man who makes sure his feelings are known. He has good intentions but is unsure of himself beneath his tough façade. Max is proud Ramsay Street was named after his grandfather, whose traditions he strives to uphold. Max is a self-employed plumber; Bell said he had wanted to play a working-class Australian because he came from a similar background.

Family life is central to Max's storylines. Writers Neil Wallis and Dave Hogan stated Max was "almost the father figure of Neighbours in the early days". Max lives with his wife Maria Ramsay (Dasha Bláhová), and their sons Shane (Peter O'Brien) and Danny (David Clencie). The family appear to be happy and Max wants nothing but the best for his sons, which is occasionally interpreted as bullying behaviour. Later scenes show Maria feels Max takes her for granted, and there is conflict between him and Shane, whom he trains to be an Olympic diver. Two months after Neighbours began, Maria says Max is not Danny's biological father; the storyline has lasting consequences for the whole family; Max resents Danny even more and his marriage comes to an end. Following Maria's departure from the show, Max's elder sister Madge Mitchell (Anne Charleston) was introduced.

Bell left Neighbours in March 1986, shortly after the show moved to Network 10, and after he and the production company could not agree about a new contract. A back injury and difficulty getting into character also influenced Bell's decision to leave the show. He found the role was no longer a pleasurable experience but later stated he had no regrets about appearing in Neighbours. His sudden departure meant Max did not receive a farewell episode. Max's final appearance is in the episode broadcast on 2 May 1986, after which he reunites with Maria off-screen. Max's brother Tom Ramsay (Gary Files) was brought in to take over Max's storylines. Critics gave Max and his behaviour a mixed reaction but Bell's performance was praised; one critic from the British Burton Mail said Max was "excellent" while Thomas Myler of the Irish Evening Herald called him "a loud-mouthed ranting 'okker' with limited intelligence". According to Robin Oliver from The Sydney Morning Herald, Bell brought "a splendidly manic style of comedy" to the role of Max.

== Creation and casting ==
Max Ramsay is one of the twelve original characters conceived by Reg Watson, the creator and then-executive producer of Neighbours. Casting director Jan Russ was tasked with casting the twelve characters; most of the cast were chosen for their comedic skills. New Zealand actor Francis Bell was cast as Max, the head of the Ramsay family. While auditioning him, Russ said she instantly knew that Bell was "perfect" for the role. Bell had wanted to act in a major role in a long-running series but had previously rejected them. However, he "leapt" at the chance to play Max as he wanted to distance himself from "the English upper crust type-casting" he had received while in Australia. Once all of the roles were cast, the actors were given "a thumbnail sketch of their characters" and met to discuss how they would play their parts. Bell told Tim Cribb of The Sydney Morning Herald; "One of the nice things about Neighbours is that it is about ordinary folk and the comedy/drama of everyday life without the melodrama. The range between the comedy and drama is enormous." The cast recorded five half-hour episodes per week; according to Bell, the younger cast members "seem to flag faster"; he also said he thought the more-experienced actors were better at conserving their energy. Bell made his debut as Max in the show's first episode, which was first broadcast on 18 March 1985.

== Development ==
=== Characterisation ===
Max was introduced as the head of the Ramsay family, who writer Josephine Monroe dubbed "the royal family of Neighbours". He is extremely proud that Ramsay Street was named after his grandfather and takes personal pride in "his" street and its residents. The Radio Times's Eithne Power noted Max is "determined" to uphold his grandfather's old traditions so Max is "practically apoplectic" when stripper Daphne Lawrence (Elaine Smith) moves to the street. Up the street, Max's neighbour Jim Robinson (Alan Dale) offers "a bit of sanity" in comparison. Neil Wallis and Dave Hogan of The Neighbours Factfile said Max was "almost the father figure of Neighbours in the early days". They described him as "essentially a nice guy, but he can be domineering at times and seems hard-headed and unmoving".

Neighbours: Behind the Scenes author James Oram also said Max likes to dominate situations, and is the type of man who will show his approval to those who agree with him and thinks those who resist are stupid. According to Oram, if Max is accused of doing something wrong or thoughtless, he always defends and justifies his actions. He called Max "a man with basically good intentions in life". Laura Denby of the Radio Times said Max is "a loudmouthed, uncouth man who always made his feelings known". Behind the character's "rough, tough façade, he is not sure of himself", and he tries to keep his insecurities hidden.

Max is a self-employed plumber. Monroe branded him "a real larrakin" and said those who employed him could often find Max enjoying a beer break. Bell told Thomas Myler of the Evening Herald he had wanted to play a working-class Australian because he came from a working-class family, and he based Max on two uncles, who were a panel beater and a butcher. In Oram's 1988 book, Bell said Max was also based on a man who helped raise him in New Zealand. Oram stated; "Max is based on a man whom I loved, but who gave me a very hard time. Playing Max is going back to my roots in a way. I was brought up in a working-class extended family and it was only through scholarships and a lot of hard work that I broke the cycle." Some British television critics said Max would not be able to afford the "comfortable" lifestyle Ramsay Street provided but at the time, plumbers in Australia earned as much as doctors and lawyers.

=== Family ===
Family is central to the character. As the series begins, Max lives with his wife Maria Ramsay (Dasha Bláhová) and their sons, Shane (Peter O'Brien) and Danny (David Clencie). Monroe said they initially appear to be "a happy, strong family. Max was hard working, Maria was beautiful, Shane was athletic and Danny was academic." Max wants nothing but the best for his sons; according to Monroe, he is the type of man who would tell them to "Do what I say, not what I do". Max occasionally appears as a bully; unlike Shane, Danny cannot deal with his father's behaviour so Max thinks he is a "wimp" and often expresses his wish Danny was more like his older brother. Problems for the family soon arise when Maria feels Max takes her for granted and Shane starts to resent his father for pushing him to train for the Olympic diving team. Max is "brutally single-minded" as he trains Shane; Margaret Koppe of TV Radio Extra wrote there is "deep-rooted conflict" between father and son. There are also tensions between Max and Danny, who are always getting at each other.

In episodes broadcast in April 1985, Maria informs Max Danny is not his biological son. Andrew Mercado of Supper Aussie Soaps said Max had long suspected Danny was not a "real Ramsay". In the family's backstory, Max and Maria had briefly separated and Danny was born ten months later. Monroe noted Max's pride is "fatally wounded" by the revelation, and it leads him to resent Danny even more and Max soon moves out to live in a bedsit. A further blow comes when Shane is injured in a car accident, ending his Olympic hopes. Shortly after, Max's and Maria's marriage end when Max becomes "so totally wrapped" in his plumbing business a "neglected" Maria leaves him and moves to Hong Kong, marking Bláhová's departure from the serial.

Following Maria's departure, producers introduced Max's elder sister Madge Mitchell (Anne Charleston) in early 1986. Patrice Fidgeon of TV Week noted that Max had enough problems when Maria walked out, but "his troubles are just about to start" because Madge is going to make his life "a misery". Charleston explained that off-screen Madge learns about Max and Maria's separation from a friend, so she immediately gets on a plane and arrives on his doorstep with a lot of luggage. Madge is convinced that Max needs looking after and she is the person to do that, much to his horror. Charleston continued by saying "Max doesn't want his sister anywhere near him, let alone in his own house, and he's horrified to think she's going to spend even one night under the same roof..." The story outline stated Max had always found Madge to be "formidable, and he never wins with her around". Madge has no time for frivolity, waste or laziness, and she often fails to find things funny, especially jokes made at her expense, which Max thrives on. According to a writer for NZ On Screen, Max's and Madge's fights showcased "the culture clashes that drove the show's early days".

=== Departure ===
Bell left Neighbours in March 1986. It was rumoured he had asked the production company Grundy's for more money and they said no; however, Bell and the company could not agree on a new contract. A back injury also influenced Bell's decision to leave the show. He said; "I was considering resigning before my back problems flared up. Negotiations had been under way between my agent and Grundy's for some time and I had decided I didn't want to do the show any more." Bell was also finding difficulty slipping into his character; according to Oram, Bell had to "psych himself up each day". The role was no longer a pleasurable experience for Bell, who said; "I can't just sort of drop into Max. I can do his voice, but to preserve the integrity of the character while churning out two and a half hours of television a week was always hard." Bell had no regrets about appearing in Neighbours and called his time there "a good experience". He added he had learnt what it took to make a soap opera, which was invaluable. In 1989, Bell later commented he did the show "to prove that I could be an Australian".

Bell's sudden departure meant Max did not receive a farewell episode. Max leaves to reunite with Maria off-screen and the pair settle in Brisbane. Producers introduced Max's brother Tom Ramsay, who was played by Gary Files, to take over Max's stories and lines. There was no time to rewrite the scripts so Max's name was crossed out and Tom's written in his place. Clencie said Bell's departure led to his own; he felt Danny had "nowhere to go" after losing both his best friend and father, leaving his character "a little adrift". Clencie said Bell was "the complete polar opposite of Max" and he felt Bell was "responsible for putting Neighbours on the map".

In 2009, producers introduced a new generation of the Ramsay family to Neighbours. In an unexpected plot twist, it emerges Max had an affair with Anne Robinson, the wife of Jim Robinson, and they had a daughter, Jill Ramsay (Perri Cummings), who gave birth to three children Kate Ramsay (Ashleigh Brewer), Harry Ramsay (Will Moore), and Sophie Ramsay (Kaiya Jones). The storyline also hinted Max had died; any mention of him was made in the past tense. On 1 October 2024, it was announced that Max's grandson and Shane's son, Max Ramsay, would be introduced to the serial, played by Ben Jackson.

== Storylines ==
Max lives on Ramsay Street with his wife Maria, and their sons Shane and Danny. He owns a plumbing business and helps train Shane for the Olympic diving team. Max is outraged when stripper Daphne Lawrence moves in with Des Clarke (Paul Keane) and they clash several times because he feels her occupation lowers the tone of the neighbourhood. Max soon learns Shane is dating Daphne. Shane and Danny are involved in a car accident in which Shane suffers a ruptured spleen and a spinal-cord injury, which ends his diving career. When Danny tells his father he wishes he had Shane's injuries, Max agrees with him but he later tells his friend and neighbour Jim Robinson he feels bad for wishing Danny was the one severely injured. Jim tries to work out why Max is so hard on Danny, and then reveals Danny has been discussing his problems with Jim. Max refuses to visit Danny in the hospital and Maria is concerned when he does not talk to Danny when he returns home. Maria's sister Anna Rossi (Roslyn Gentle) visits the family and starts a relationship with Jim; Max disapproves of their relationship because he thinks Anna should marry someone who does not have baggage. When Jim and Anna get engaged, Max refuses to be Jim's best man. Anna eventually ends the relationship and leaves town. Shane asks Max to take on Danny's diving training and he eventually agrees. Although he complains about Danny's poor attitude to training, Max is impressed when he sees Danny dive. Danny, however, struggles with Max's teaching technique and when Max thinks he is slacking, he tells Danny he will not train him any more.

Max apologises to Danny for treated him poorly and says he believes in his diving ability but Danny refuses to let Max train him again. Danny and Shane arrange their own training sessions and Danny enters a local competition, which he wins. Max is not pleased and he later tells Maria coaching was his thing and he is no longer needed. Maria tells Max to move on and says they have more time to be a couple. Max supports Danny when he is wrongly accused of robbing Carol Brown (Merrin Canning) and confronts her about the accusation but later admits he thinks Danny is guilty. He catches Danny sneaking out to meet with his friend Scott Robinson (Jason Donovan) and almost strikes him. The boys run away and Maria feels Max was too hard on Danny, and Max appears not to care if Danny returns home. When Maria asks Max why he does not love Danny as much as Shane, he says he was never sure Danny was his biological son; after demanding the truth from her, Maria tells Max he is not. Maria was afraid to tell Max in case it worsened his relationship with Danny. Max realises Maria became pregnant during a brief separation and tells Jim he never thought she would do that to him. Jim suggests Max speak to Maria but he refuses. Max later tells Maria he will never come to terms with Danny not being his son; he tells Maria their marriage is over and he moves into a bedsit. Max is visited by an old school friend Nick Burman (Vic Hawkins), who says he has feelings for Maria. Nick takes Max to the pub and insists Max drives them home but they are involved in an accident and Max is charged with drink-driving.

Max fractured his arm in the accident so Shane helps with Max's business but quits when Max interferes too much. Danny returns home and Max assures him he is not the reason for his separation from Maria. Max appears in court for the drink-driving charge; he is banned from driving for six months and fined A$1,000. Needing someone to drive him to his plumbing jobs, Max employs and fires two assistants until Maria helps him find apprentice plumber Terry Inglis (Maxine Klibingaitis), who Max initially dismisses because she is a woman. Max gives Terry the most difficult tasks but she completes them all and Max is impressed with her work. Max and Shane learn Terry is married to Gordon Miller (Red Symons), the man who caused their car accident. Gordon escapes prison and threatens Max, Shane and Terry with a gun. When Gordon drops the weapon, Max picks it up and they call the police, who arrest Gordon. Shane later moves in with Max. Maria tells Max she wants a divorce; he realises she has moved on when she begins dating Richard Morrison (Peter Flett). Max and Maria admit they will always love each other, and Max later vows to be a better father to Danny. Max agrees to give Terry away at her wedding to Paul Robinson (Stefan Dennis). Max tells Jim he still loves Maria and that he should have tried to fix things sooner but now it is too late. Jim tells max Richard has accepted a job overseas so there is still a chance he and Maria can reconcile. Maria, however, informs Max she is leaving with Richard. When she mentions Danny does not want to go, Max refuses to help her. Max tells his sons he and Danny have an improved relationship since they started living apart and he does not want to ruin it.

Oh the day of Paul's and Terry's wedding, Maria leaves while Max and Danny watch. Max and Shane move back to Ramsay Street, where they and Danny struggle with the housework. Max dates Danny's French teacher Kate Drew (Suzanne Lobez) and Danny discovers Max is not his biological father when he overhears them talking. When Danny asks why Max kept him, Max says no matter what, Danny will always be as much his son as Shane is. Max is gutted when Terry shoots Paul and is later arrested for the murder of Charles Durham (Ross Thompson). Max's sister Madge comes to stay and says she was worried after hearing about his break-up with Maria, and the scandal with Paul and Terry. Max is not pleased when he discovers his new neighbour Clive Gibbons (Geoff Paine) runs a gorillagram agency from his house. He clashes with Clive numerous times and is infuriated when he learns Madge and Danny are working for Clive. After Max wins A$500 betting on a horse race, Danny creates a betting system on their computer and Max tells him to use his winnings to bet on seven races. All of the horses win and Max believes he has won over A$6,000 until Danny says he did not put the bet on because he had doubts about his system. They try again but a mistake leads Danny to bet the money on the wrong horse; Max collapses when he tries to comprehend what happened. Clive attends to him, thinking Max has had a heart attack, and reveals he is a doctor. Max refuses to visit his GP so Madge tries to persuade him to change his diet but Max refuses. Max suffers another bout of chest pains and finally visits the doctor, who diagnosis him with severe indigestion.

Max convinces his family and friends he is dying, leading Jim to give him an old watch and Madge is persuaded to sign over her half of the house to him. Helen Daniels (Anne Haddy), however, learns the truth from the doctor and tells the Ramsays, who play a prank on Max by pretending they cannot wait until he is dead. He eventually learns of the prank from Des and then silently ignores his family until they assemble to celebrate his birthday. Max goes on a few dates with Helen's sister Laura Dennison (Carole Skinner) during her short stay in Erinsborough. Daphne organises a pancake-making competition at her café, and Max and Madge are the two finalists. Max asks Helen for help and Madge accuses them of cheating. Max's pancakes turn out badly but the competition is forgotten when Maria calls Max and asks for a reconciliation. Max leaves Erinsborough to join her in Brisbane and swaps jobs with his brother Tom. In 2009, it is revealed Max and Jim's wife Anne Robinson had had an affair and Anne gave birth to a daughter, Jill, whose existence is discovered accidentally by Elle Robinson and her boyfriend Lucas Fitzgerald when they find a locket belonging to Elle's grandmother Anne underneath the old Ramsay house.

== Reception ==
In his review of Neighbours' first episodes, Mike Carlton of The Sydney Morning Herald said he had not seen Bell before but found his performance offered "the sort of underplayed subtlety made famous by Tony Packard and the fat bloke in the Beaurepaire tyre commercial". Barbara Hooks of The Age called Max "a blustering plumber". She said the scripts would benefit from some tightening and editing, and using Max as an example, she wrote; "And given the show's youthful audience, it also should be possible to convey the color and flavor of a character as rough as Max's without resorting to the lazy device of ungrammatical speech." The Burton Mail's television critic Mike was a fan of the character, calling him "excellent" and a "Down Under drip with a lovable streak". Hilary Kingsley, writing for the Daily Mirror, dubbed the character "Mad Max Ramsay, the pontificating plumber". In her book Soap Opera, Dorothy Hobson describes Max and his family as "more working class than other characters", and states; "They had working-class jobs but were not represented as cloth cap wearing or dowdy, they were bright and modern and representative of a vibrant and working population".

Thomas Myler of the Evening Herald called Max "a loud-mouthed ranting 'okker' with limited intelligence who communicates in a series of yells, snarls and shouts". Myler said the character showed "flickerings" of sensitivity but it was "a long way from discovering that King Lear is not some kind of light aircraft". Myler also said Max's personality starkly contrasts with Bell's, who was erudite and well-spoken. While reviewing the serial, Nick Smurthwaite of The Stage wondered if Australian fathers could really get away with warning their adult sons from dating "the wrong type" of women. According to Smurthwaite:

Max Ramsay is the cardboard cutout Ozzie clod who warns his son, Shane, against dating Daphne because she works as a stag-night stripper. His main fear seems to be the effect the newly arrived Daphne might have on the price of his property. Small wonder Ramsay's other son, Danny, wakes up in the night sweating and screaming.

According to Radio Times's Eithne Power, Maria cannot do much to restrain her "volatile" husband while his sons appear to be resigned to "the unpredictability of this self-employed, prosperous but insecure plumber". She also said Shane appears to be the apple of Max's eye but Danny is "a blot on the cul-de-sac", and often bears the brunt of Max's temper. Power also wrote; "In the early stages we all wondered why Maria stood for this disgusting favouritism ... when Max unleashed one of his terrible tirades on Danny. From where we were sitting it looked like a case for the NSPCC." The character's profile on the BBC's Neighbours website stated his most notable moment is "Finding out that Danny wasn't really his son".

While pointing out the differences between Jim and Max's performances, Michael Shmith of The Age said Max "possessed the sort of voice at which one should clap on a set of earmuffs, as so men at airports when a jumbo taxis in". He also said when Max yells at Danny, birds would fly from the trees in shock. The Sydney Morning Herald's Robin Oliver praised Bell's performance in the early days of the serial, saying:

there was a strong sense of approval for the leading role, taken by actor Francis Bell, who brought a splendidly manic style of comedy to the role of the nosey-parkering Max Ramsay, brother of Madge, a there-goes-the-neighbourhood-man always ready to have his hackles raised if there was the slightest chance that anything unorthodox might be happening across the street.

According to Oliver, that type of comedy is funny, and he said it was "a pity" Bell left Neighbours because the action seemed stilted and the show "lost much of its fluid drive". Max's popularity with the audience and Bell's sudden departure from Neighbours resulted in the forming of several "Bring Back Max Ramsay" fan clubs.
