= List of Neighbours characters introduced in 1985 =

The following is a list of characters that first appeared in the Australian soap opera Neighbours in 1985, by order of first appearance. They were all introduced by the show's creator and executive producer Reg Watson. The 1st season of Neighbours began airing on 18 March 1985. The first episode introduced the members of the Ramsay and Robinson families as well as bachelor Des Clarke, and his soon-to-be wife and former stripper Daphne Lawrence. Max Ramsay, his wife Maria and their sons, Shane and Danny lived at Number 24. Jim Robinson lived next door with his children; Paul, Julie, Scott and Lucy. They were joined by Jim's mother in law, Helen Daniels. Myra De Groot joined the cast as Des's mother, Eileen and Maxine Klibingaitis arrived as plumber's assistant, Terry Inglis. Philip Martin began appearing from June and his children, Debbie and Michael, arrived in July and October respectively. George Young and con man Douglas Blake, played by Anne Haddy's real-life husband James Condon, made their first appearances in September.

== Max Ramsay ==
Max Ramsay, played by Francis Bell, made his first on-screen appearance on 18 March 1985. Max is the patriarch of the Ramsay family and Ramsay Street is named after his grandfather. Max lived at No.24 with his wife, Maria (Dasha Bláhová) and their sons, Shane (Peter O'Brien) and Danny (David Clencie). Bell based the character of Max on a person who helped raise him in New Zealand. He said "Max is based on a man whom I loved, but who gave me a very hard time".

== Danny Ramsay ==
Danny Ramsay, played by David Clencie, made his first on-screen appearance on 18 March 1985. Danny was the first character to speak in Neighbours. He is the youngest son of Maria Ramsay (Dagmar Bláhová) and brother to Shane Ramsay (Peter O'Brien). Jason Donovan was initially offered the role of Danny before it was given to Clencie. Danny was often described as the "gentler" of the two brothers.

== Maria Ramsay ==
Maria Ramsay
- Neighbours character
- Portrayed by: Dasha Bláhová
- First appearance: 18 March 1985
- Last appearance: 13 September 1985
- Created by: Reg Watson
- Introduced by: Reg Watson
In-universe information
- Occupation: Housewife
- Family: Ramsay
- Father: Franco Rossi
- Mother: Anna Rossi
- Sisters: Anna Rossi Jr.
- Husband: Max Ramsay
- Sons: Danny Ramsay; Shane Ramsay

Maria Ramsay, played by Dasha Bláhová, made her first appearance during the show's first episode broadcast on 18 March 1985. She was the first regular character to leave the serial, after six months on screen. Maria is married to Max Ramsay (Francis Bell) and is the mother of Shane Ramsay (Peter O'Brien) and Danny Ramsay (David Clencie). Maria is billed as "a warm and sensitive woman, tolerant of her husband's moods." Her best friend is Helen Daniels (Anne Haddy), who helped Maria and Max reconcile after a period of separation, and is the only other person aware that Max is not Danny's biological father. Television critic, Andrew Mercado called the Ramsay family the backbone of the serial during the early years. In her book "Soap opera", Dorothy Hobson describes Maria and her family as "more working class than other characters". She also said "They had working-class jobs but were not represented as cloth cap wearing or dowdy, they were bright and modern and representative of a vibrant and working population." To celebrate the 20th anniversary of Neighbours, the BBC asked readers to nominate their twenty favourite obscure characters. Maria came in fourteenth place in list. In her review of the serial, Jacqueline Lee Lewis of The Sydney Morning Herald felt Bláhová "gives a particularly sensitive performance" as Maria.

Maria is the daughter of an Italian father, Franco and a Czech mother, Anna. She is married to Max Ramsay, whom she met when he worked with her father in Queensland. They live at Number 24 Ramsay Street with their sons Shane and Danny. Maria's marriage to Max is rocky as their personalities are different. She notices that Max does not have the same interest in Danny as he does with Shane, and she suspects that Max knows he is not Danny's real father. Maria interviews Terry Inglis (Maxine Klibingaitis) to be Max's assistant and Terry tells her that she is keen to prove that she can do the job as well as any man. Maria supports her and gives Terry the job.

When Danny turns eighteen, Maria tells Max that when she found him with another woman on their wedding anniversary, she ran away to a country inn, where she met Tim Duncan (Nick Carrafa). They had a one-night stand and she later found out she was pregnant with Danny. Only her friend Helen Daniels knew the truth. Max becomes enraged and moves into a bedsit. While the couple are separated, Maria falls in love with Richard Morrison (Peter Flett). Danny does not accept the relationship and causes difficulties for them. When Richard gets a job in Hong Kong, Maria makes the difficult choice to leave Danny behind and be with Richard. After a few months, Maria returns to her mother's home and she calls Max. Max agrees to give their marriage a second chance and he moves to Brisbane to be with her. Nearly 40 years later, Shane returns to Erinsborough to buy into Lassiter's Hotel. When 24 Ramsay Street is put up for sale, he calls Maria and promises to buy it for her.

== Julie Robinson ==
Julie Robinson, later Julie Martin, is played by Vikki Blanche in 1985, and by Julie Mullins from 1992. Julie made her first screen appearance during the episode broadcast on 18 March 1985. Julie is the daughter of Anne and Jim Robinson (Alan Dale), however Jim is not Julie's biological father. His boss Roger Bannon had raped Anne and Julie was the product. Jim agreed to bring Julie up as his own. Julie is described as being unable to keep her nose out of other people's business and having a "pompous manner." Of Julie, The Independent said "Julie Martin, is such an accomplished blamer that she would be beaten up daily if she were a schoolgirl."

== Paul Robinson ==
Paul Robinson, played by Stefan Dennis, made his first screen appearance during the episode broadcast on 18 March 1985. Dennis' agent got him the audition with Neighbours and he was initially not keen. He auditioned for the roles of Shane Ramsay and Des Clarke before being cast as Paul. Paul was shown to be the quieter member of his family and he previously worked as an air steward.

== Scott Robinson ==
Scott Robinson, played by Darius Perkins in 1985 and by Jason Donovan from 1986, made his first screen appearance during the episode broadcast on 18 March 1985. Scott is the youngest son of Anne and Jim Robinson (Alan Dale). He is best friends with Danny Ramsay (David Clencie) and dates Kim Taylor (Jenny Young).

== Helen Daniels ==
Helen Daniels, played by Anne Haddy, made her first screen appearance during the episode broadcast on 18 March 1985. Haddy was invited by Watson to play Helen, a mother-in-law who was not a stereotypical battleaxe. Helen is the matriarch of the Robinson family household. She married her childhood sweetheart Bill and they had a daughter, Anne. Helen and Bill later adopted Rosemary (Joy Chambers). Helen is described as being "a shoulder to cry on for her friends and family". She is sympathetic, caring and motherly.

== Shane Ramsay ==
Shane Ramsay, played by Peter O'Brien, made his first screen appearance during the episode broadcast on 18 March 1985. Shane is the elder son of Max (Francis Bell) and Maria Ramsay (Dasha Bláhová). O'Brien auditioned for the role of Shane twice in 1984 and following the cancellation of medical series Starting Out, he was cast as the older Ramsay brother. Shane was described by Network Ten as a "very together guy, despite being deprived of a normal childhood because of his father's obsession with his diving training".

== Des Clarke ==
Des Clarke, played by Paul Keane, made his first screen appearance during the episode broadcast on 18 March 1985. Des, a bank manager, is engaged to Lorraine Kingham (Antoinette Byron), until she calls off the wedding. He then allows Daphne Lawrence (Elaine Smith) to move in. Stefan Dennis originally auditioned for the role of Des.

== Daphne Lawrence ==
Daphne Lawrence, played by Elaine Smith, made her first screen appearance during the episode broadcast on 18 March 1985. Daphne is introduced as a stripper hired for Des Clarke's (Paul Keane) bucks party. Smith originally auditioned for a guest role, but her appearance, particularly her spiky hairstyle, caught the attention of the casting director and he cast her in the role of Daphne.

== Jim Robinson ==
Jim Robinson, played by Alan Dale, is the patriarch of the Robinson family. He made his first screen appearance during the episode broadcast on 18 March 1985. The role of Jim was originally given to Robin Harrison, but when contract negotiations broke down between him and Neighbours, the role was given to Dale. Jim is described as a man having it all: wealth, children and having a way with women. Jim changed after his wife's death and was often seen as having a reserved sadness within him, he has also been perceived as "stuffy and proper".

== Lucy Robinson ==
Lucy Robinson, is the youngest of Jim Robinson's (Alan Dale) children. She made her first screen appearance during the episode broadcast on 18 March 1985. The role was played by Kylie Flinker from her debut to 1987, by Sasha Close between 1987 and 1989, and by Melissa Bell from 1991. Lucy was created as a young child to help the show appeal to all ages. As played by Flinker, Lucy is described as being an innocent child who never does anything wrong.

== Kim Taylor ==
Kim Taylor
- Neighbours character
- Portrayed by: Jenny Young
- Duration: 1985, 2017
- First appearance: 20 March 1985
- Last appearance: 6 April 2017
- Introduced by: Reg Watson (1985); Jason Herbison (2017)
In-universe information
- Other names: Kim Tanaka
- Occupation: Student
- Mother: Marcia Taylor
- Stepfather: Neil Taylor
- Half-sisters: Karen
- Sons: David Tanaka; Leo Tanaka
- Granddaughters: Isla Tanaka-Brennan; Abigail Tanaka
- Grandmothers: Kazuko Sano

Kim Taylor (also Tanaka), played by Jenny Young, made her first appearance on 20 March 1985, and initially appears until 11 June 1985. The character and her parents were one of the serial's guest families, who departed when their storyline played out. Kim was billed as "a nice, bright girl, but lonely at school because her mother is an unpopular teacher." Kim dates her friend Scott Robinson (Darius Perkins) and tries to keep it a secret from her parents. Amanda Zachariah of TV Week said the pair "fell in love in spite of parental disapproval."

After being off-screen for a number of weeks, the character returns in June, but she is no longer the "cute schoolgirl" she once was. Kim has been living on the streets and she reveals to Scott that she is pregnant. Young told Zachariah: "You would hardly recognise Kim when she comes back into the series. I have never lived on the street or found myself pregnant but I can imagine that it would damage you psychologically." She also explained that Scott is not the father of Kim's baby, but she asks for his help as he is her only real friend. Young had sympathy for her character and believed the episodes were handled "very realistically", especially for the show's early time slot. Of filming the scenes, she stated "When I return to the series I cry a lot and experience a huge amount of emotional upset. Darius and I had to work through a lot of emotions." Following the introduction of Kim's sons David (Takaya Honda) and Leo Tanaka (Tim Kano) in 2016, Young reprised her role after thirty-two years as Kim returned to Erinsborough on 30 March 2017 to visit them.

While Kim is in a relationship with Scott Robinson, she keeps it a secret from her mother, Marcia Taylor (Maureen Edwards), knowing she will not approve. Danny Ramsay (David Clencie) and his friend Eddie Sherwin (Darren Boyd) reveal the relationship when they play a practical joke. They record a conversation between Kim and Scott and edit it to make it sound sexual. Marcia, who teaches at Erinsborough High, forces the boys to play the tape in class, embarrassing Kim and Scott. The couple run away together and they hide out in an old monastery. Kim's mother makes a televised appeal for her safe return.

Scott's father Jim Robinson (Alan Dale) finds them at the old monastery, and Scott agrees to return home. However, Kim runs away upon hearing their conversation. She later calls her mother to let her know that she will not be back. Kim goes into the city and finds a bedsit to share with a girl called Sonia (Cindy Lee). Scott's brother, Paul Robinson (Stefan Dennis), and Father Barry (Wayne Cull) track her down, but Kim refuses to return home. Weeks later, Kim gets in touch with Scott asking if he can lend her some money and he borrows it from Paul. Kim insists her new life is preferable to returning home, and after she propositions Scott for sex he resolves not to see her again.

After another few weeks, Kim approaches Scott in the park and reveals she is pregnant. Scott helps her to find a new place to stay, asking Paul for money to give her. She tells Scott that Brad (Rick Ireland), who is allegedly the father of her child, wants her to get rid of the baby. Brad finds Kim's halfway house and he tells her that he wants her and their baby back. Kim's pregnant friend, Josie (Cindy Lee), reveals that Brad is arranging for them both to sell their babies. Scott disapproves, and when Brad starts threatening her, Kim reconsiders the plan. She decides against it altogether when she sees how unhappy Josie is after giving her child away. Scott speaks to Paul, who arranges them to visit a family planning clinic. At the clinic, Kim breaks down and is unsure whether to go through with an abortion. Helen Daniels (Anne Haddy) offers to assist Kim by tracking down her parents, who have moved away. Marcia initially refuses to acknowledge Kim, but she eventually goes to see her. Marcia explains to Kim that she had been in a similar situation twenty-seven years ago. She was forced to give away her baby, a daughter called Karen. Kim tells her mother that she needs her support and they go home.

Kim returns to Erinsborough thirty two years later to visit her sons David and Leo Tanaka, who want to know who their father is. Disproving her sons' suspicions, Kim confirms that Hiroshi Udagawa is not their father, but refuses to talk about the subject any further. She then asks Paul's daughter, Amy Williams (Zoe Cramond), to stay away from David and Leo. Kim meets with Paul and she tells him that he is David and Leo's father; they then learn that Amy and Leo are on a holiday together, and Kim and Paul race to stop them having sex. They make it just in time, and Kim and Paul reveal the truth. David is angry with Kim for keeping their father's identity a secret. Paul apologises to Kim, who tells him to be the father her boys deserve.

== Eileen Clarke ==
Eileen Clarke
- Neighbours character
- Portrayed by: Myra De Groot
- Duration: 1985–1988
- First appearance: 15 April 1985
- Last appearance: 28 March 1988
- Introduced by: Reg Watson
In-universe information
- Occupation: Retired; Part-time waitress
- Brothers: Bob Winston
- Husband: Malcolm Clarke (divorced)
- Sons: Des Clarke
- Grandsons: Jamie Clarke

Eileen Clarke, played by Myra De Groot, made her first appearance during the episode broadcast on 15 April 1985. De Groot was only supposed to be in Neighbours for a week, but she thought Eileen was too interesting to be allowed to leave and wrote an expanded character and took it to the producers, who signed her up for an ongoing role. De Groot continued in the role until it was curtailed by her treatment for cancer; she died a week after her final appearance aired. One of Eileen's prominent stories was the reintroduction of her estranged husband Malcolm Clarke (Noel Trevarthen). Eileen shares a son with Malcolm, Des (Paul Keane). In their backstory, it details that Malcolm left Eileen and had another child Sally Wells (Rowena Mohr) and again abandoned his family. Writers explored this by introducing Sally into the series in search of her father which concluded with his arrival in Erinsborough. Eileen reunites with Malcolm and agrees to marry him. Patrice Fidgeon from TV Week reported that their wedding would not happen because of Eileen's "overbearing" ways. On-screen Eileen is so fixated on conducting the wedding her way that Malcolm changes his mind. The story ended with Eileen alone on her wedding day as Malcolm decides to flee once again.

A writer from The Soap Show called Eileen an "interfering mother." While an Inside Soap journalist called her "overbearing" and "the mother from hell". They believed she was the reason why Des struggled to cope with things by himself. Eileen was named as one of the BBC's twenty favourite obscure Neighbours characters. Viewers said "Des Clarke's mother Eileen, played by Myra de Groot. I remember the episode when they went to church and she sung so loudly and out of tune that the rest of the congregation stopped singing, but she ploughed on regardless. It was hysterical".

When her husband, Malcolm, walks out on her, Eileen is left to raise their son Des alone. Des leaves home after becoming tired of Eileen's interfering ways. Eileen later follows Des to Erinsborough to check up on him and she takes an instant dislike to Des' housemate, Daphne Lawrence (Elaine Smith). Eileen feigns illness in the hope of extending her stay, but Des sees through her and gets her checked over by a doctor, who tells Eileen that she is fine. Eileen decides to move permanently to Erinsborough anyway, and Des finds his mother a home near Ramsay Street. Eileen realises that Des and Daphne are in love and she come to accept Daphne. Des proposes to Daphne and Eileen misses the wedding because she is on a cruise. Eileen stays with Des and Daphne after her home is burgled. Des takes Daphne on honeymoon and leaves Eileen to look after his house and care for their teenage charge, Mike Young (Guy Pearce). Eileen becomes involved in the community and helps Daphne out at her new Coffee Shop. She also joins the Erinsborough Musical Society.

Nell Mangel (Vivean Gray) reads Eileen's tea leaves for her and reveals that a younger man is soon going to enter her life. Eileen begins dressing younger to attract a young man and becomes convinced that Harold Bishop (Ian Smith) is her admirer. Eileen tries to make Harold notice her and he later accepts an offer of dinner. Nell becomes jealous and tells Eileen that Harold is a womaniser, Eileen then ends her pursuit of him. Daphne gives birth to Jamie (SJ Dey) and Eileen dotes on her grandson. Malcolm arrives in Ramsay Street after his daughter, Sally, comes to meet Des. Both Eileen and Des are reluctant to see him, but Malcolm romances Eileen and they decide to get married again. However, Malcolm leaves Eileen on the day of the wedding. Eileen grows close to Sally after his departure, but she also develops an addiction to tranquillisers. She later overcomes this with the help of her family and friends. Daphne dies after a car accident and Eileen suffers a nervous breakdown and is put into a rest home. Off-screen, Eileen joins Sally on a trip to Europe, gifted to them by Malcolm, upon Sally's departure from Erinsborough. They settle in England, where Eileen falls in love and marries.

== Terry Inglis ==
Terry Inglis, played by Maxine Klibingaitis, made her first screen appearance during the episode broadcast on 11 June 1985. Terry is employed by Max Ramsay (Francis Bell) as a plumber's assistant. She begins a relationship with Paul Robinson (Stefan Dennis), which The Sydney Morning Herald said was a "whirlwind romance."

== Philip Martin ==
Philip Martin, played by Christopher Milne in 1985 and by Ian Rawlings from 1992, made his first screen appearance during the episode broadcast on 21 June 1985. Philip is the husband of Loretta (Lyn Semler/Jane Bayly) and father to Debbie (Mandy Storvik/Katrina McEwan/Marnie Reece-Wilmore) and Michael (Samuel Hammington/Troy Beckwith), and later to Hannah Martin (Rebecca Ritters). He is the manager of the Pacific Bank.

== Debbie Martin ==
Debbie Martin, played by Mandy Storvik and Katrina McEwan in 1985, and by Marnie Reece-Wilmore from 1992, made her first screen appearance during the episode broadcast on 22 July 1985. Debbie is the only daughter of Philip (Christopher Milne/Ian Rawlings) and Loretta Martin (Lyn Semler/Jane Bayly).

== George Young ==
George Young
- Neighbours character
- Portrayed by: Alan Cassell
- First appearance: 3 September 1985
- Last appearance: 23 October 1985
- Introduced by: Reg Watson
In-universe information
- Occupation: Financial assistant
- Wife: Wilma (backstory)

George Young, played by Alan Cassell, made his first appearance on 3 September 1985. Cassell had sworn off joining another long-running series following a run of bad luck with several projects, including the short-lived Taurus Rising. However, he decided to join Neighbours for an eight-week stint as George after reading about the role, which was very different to anything he had played on television before. He had become known for his "tough guy" image and found the Neighbours role surprising as there was a comedic element to it, an area Cassell was keen to work in. He was pleased that producer John Holmes "showed imagination" in casting him in such a role and hoped that it would show other producers a different side to him. Shortly after accepting the part, Cassell learned that Seven had cancelled Neighbours. He commented "I had no idea the show was going to get axed when I signed for it. They must have heard I was going to start work on it!"

George is "a middle-class" bank employee who joins Des Clarke (Paul Keane) and Julie Robinson (Vikki Blanche) at Pacific Bank. Cassell described him as "one of those sought-after elderly widower gentlemen". George becomes a love interest for Des's mother Eileen Clarke (Myra De Groot), who also takes "a bit of a shine to him". Cassell explained that Eileen initially acts coyly around him, but when they begin dating, she becomes bossy, which George does not mind because he was married for 20 years and was used to being bossed around. He added "I've always been seen on TV as a hard-nosed tough guy policeman, but this guy is really soft... he falls right under Eileen's spell."

George begins working at the bank, alongside Des Clarke. When he mentions that he has been on his own since his wife died two years ago, Des invites him to his house for dinner. George gets on well with Des's mother Eileen Clarke and they bond over a shared interest in the opera. George asks her out to dinner. They get on well and continue to see each other. When George and Eileen have an argument, Eileen keeps George waiting at a restaurant to punish him. George gets fed up and leaves, but is struck by a skate-boarder outside, leaving him with a broken toe. Eileen invites George to dine with her and her employer Max Ramsay (Francis Bell). George tells Max that Eileen is overworked, while Max belittles George. The following day, George returns to tell Max that he should start respecting Eileen more, and Max later apologises. George proposes to Eileen, but she turns him down, as marriage between them would not work.

== Douglas Blake ==
Douglas Blake
- Neighbours character
- Portrayed by: James Condon
- Duration: 1985–1986
- First appearance: 17 November 1985
- Last appearance: 18 February 1986
- Introduced by: Reg Watson
In-universe information
- Other names: Douglas Manning
- Occupation: Con man
- Sisters: Amanda Blake

Douglas Blake, played by James Condon, made his first appearance on 17 September 1985. Condon's casting was publicised in the 31 August 1985 issue of TV Week. He joined the cast until late September when production was due to wind up following the show's cancellation. His character was introduced as a love interest for Helen Daniels, played by Condon's real life wife Anne Haddy. Haddy and Condon had not worked alongside each other before. Until Neighbours, Condon had also been out of work for a while, but suddenly found himself "juggling roles" in Neighbours, Prisoner and Body Business, while Haddy was facing the prospect of being out of work. Douglas was billed as "an elegant and self-assured art advisor." Haddy told Jenny Cooney (TV Week) that Helen regularly shows her art at the local bank, where it catches Douglas's eye. She said he "flatters her and tries to sweep her off her feet. But he seems almost too smooth and is a bit of a suspicious character." Haddy also said that she and Condon, as well as the viewers, would not know the outcome of Helen and Douglas's romance until the release of the scripts, which were being rewritten due to the serial ending early. She told Cooney: "They haven't decided yet whether to let Helen and Douglas end up together – we hope so." It later emerges that Douglas is a con man who has targeted Helen.

When Helen Daniels (Haddy) displays her art work, she attracts the attentions of Douglas. He tells her that her work is great and that he can help her to make a name for herself with an exhibition. Jim Robinson (Alan Dale) is suspicious of Douglas and he finds out from Max Ramsay (Francis Bell) that Douglas has a wife. Jim warns Douglas off of Helen, but Douglas explains that the woman is actually his sister, Amanda (Linda McConchie). Douglas plans the exhibition and tells Helen not to pay any money towards it. Helen calls the gallery shortly before the exhibition takes place and is told that Douglas had pulled out. Helen confronts Douglas and he tells her that did not feel that the gallery owners were keen on her work. Helen and Douglas begin to grow closer and Douglas takes Helen to a guesthouse for the weekend. Helen admits that things are moving too quickly for her, but she realises that it might be her last chance for happiness and they start making wedding plans. Douglas says that he is going to buy a cottage for them both, but just before the wedding Douglas tells Helen that the sale on his house had fallen through and he could not purchase the cottage. Jim suggests that he lends the money to Douglas until his house is sold, Helen is unsure, but Douglas talk her round. Jim gives the money to Douglas, but days after the documents are apparently drawn up, Douglas disappears. Jim breaks the news to Helen, who is furious that Douglas had broken her heart and left the family with financial problems.

Helen hires a private investigator to track down Douglas and he discovers that Douglas is at a hotel in the city. Helen gets Madge Mitchell (Anne Charleston) to help her in a plot that would see Jim get his money back. Madge poses as a rich, single woman who checks into the hotel where Douglas is staying. She makes sure that he overhears her complaining about standards and he approaches her. He tells her that his name is Douglas Manning and Madge explains that she is having trouble paying her bill. She explains that she has some diamonds and Douglas tells her that he would be happy to value them for her. Douglas asks why she does not sell the diamonds to pay the bill, but Madge tells him that she took them from her ex-husband. Douglas convinces her to give him a diamond, so he can have it valued. Madge gives him a real diamond from her wedding ring and Douglas tells her that it is worth less than it actually is. Douglas presses her to sell it and the other diamonds. He later tells her that he has found a buyer for the diamonds, which delights Madge. They arrange to meet and exchange the money and the diamonds. Helen decides to apply some extra pressure and her private investigator approaches Douglas in the lobby and explains that he is working for Helen. Douglas panics and he makes the exchange with Madge, who gives him fake diamonds. As he leaves, he sees Helen and pretends to be happy to see her. She reveals that she and Madge set him up and that he had just paid $50,000 for fake diamonds, before walking away.

== Michael Martin ==
Michael Martin, played by Samuel Hammington in 1985 and by Troy Beckwith from 1992, is the only son of Philip (Christopher Milne/Ian Rawlings) and Loretta Martin (Lyn Semler/Jane Bayly). He made his first screen appearance during the episode broadcast on 8 October 1985. A writer from Ausculture described him as a "troubled teen."

== Others ==
| Date(s) | Character | Actor | Circumstances |
|---|---|---|---|
| 18 March | Dr. Lawson | Andrew Gilmour | Dr. Lawson is the Ramsay family's G.P., who Danny visits at the request of his father, Max, when he begins having nightmares of his brother Shane dying in a diving accident. |
| 18–22 March | Lorraine Kingham | Antoinette Byron | Lorraine is a friend of Julie Robinson. She got engaged to Des Clarke after meeting him through Julie. The night before the wedding, Julie subconsciously talks Lorraine out of marrying Des and she and her parents call the wedding off in the morning. Lorraine then takes all of the furniture. A couple of years later, Des meets Lorraine when he is away for a conference. |
| 18–19 March | Mrs Kingham | Christine Kaman | Mr and Mrs Kingham are Lorraine's parents. Mr Kingham has reservations about her wedding to Des Clarke, but Mrs Kingham supports her daughter. Lorraine realises that she does not love Des and she and her parents tell him the wedding is off. They are shocked to see Daphne Lawrence coming out of Des' bedroom, where she was trying to find her watch. Mr Kingham recognises her as a receptionist who accused him of sexual harassment. He quickly leaves, but Mrs Kingham apologises to both Des and Daphne. |
| 18–19 March | Mr Kingham | James Taylor | Mr and Mrs Kingham are Lorraine's parents. Mr Kingham has reservations about her wedding to Des Clarke, but Mrs Kingham supports her daughter. Lorraine realises that she does not love Des and she and her parents tell him the wedding is off. They are shocked to see Daphne Lawrence coming out of Des' bedroom, where she was trying to find her watch. Mr Kingham recognises her as a receptionist who accused him of sexual harassment. He quickly leaves, but Mrs Kingham apologises to both Des and Daphne. |
| 20 March–18 April | Mrs. Armitage | Marion Heathfield | Mrs. Armitage is a resident of Ramsay Street. She frequently complains to Helen Daniels about her husband, who she claims is abusive and later having an affair. Helen doubts her stories are true. She also reports that the street's gossips are suggesting Helen has a problem with alcohol. |
| 20 March–11 June | Marcia Taylor | Maureen Edwards | Marcia is a teacher at Erinsborough High and the mother of Kim. When she learns that Kim is dating Scott Robinson, she bans her from seeing him. Kim runs away with Scott. Marcia tries to find Kim, but eventually the Taylors decide to move away. Weeks later, Helen Daniels calls Marcia and tells her that they have found Kim. Scott takes her to a squat where a pregnant Kim is living. Marcia tells her that she had to give up a baby when she was younger and she makes up with Kim. |
| 20 March | Dr. Willis | Arthur Barradell-Smith | Dr Willis is the Taylor family's physician. Kim visits his surgery and asks to be put on the pill. |
| 21–23 March | Neil Taylor | Bruce Kerr | Neil is the husband of Marcia. He is an accountant and struggles to speak out against his wife's decisions regarding their daughter Kim, but is more sensitive to Kim's feelings than Marcia. He is described as Kim's father in 1985, and her stepfather in 2017. |
| 21–28 March | Eddie Sherwin | Darren Boyd | Eddie is a friend of Danny Ramsay. Eddie and Danny record a conversation between Scott Robinson and Kim Taylor and they edit it to sound sexual. Marcia Taylor makes them play it during a class and embarrassing Scott and Kim. Eddie later gets Danny into trouble when they go to a music store and Eddie steals a cassette tape and Danny is caught instead. |
| 27 March | Street Walker | Mickey Camilleri | The street walker approaches Kim Taylor in a Melbourne back street, and tells her to find somewhere else to make money. |
| 27 March–25 April | Father Barry | Wayne Cull | Father Kevin Barry is a Catholic priest is an old friend of Daphne Lawrence. He comes to collect Paul Robinson from Number 26, as Father Barry has had a tip off about Kim Taylor's whereabouts. After questioning Sonia at a squat, she calls for Kim to come out and talk to them. Kim tells Father Barry to tell her parents that she is okay, but she is not coming home. Paul becomes interested in Father Barry's social work, and Father Barry asks him to come and volunteer for the church. He later visits Daphne. Father Barry also counsels Carol Brown through her alcoholism, and insitgates her conversation with Paul that leads her towards recovery. |
| 28 March | Sonia | Cindy Lee | Father Barry and Paul Robinson question Sonia about Kim Taylor, who has run away from home. After learning that they are there on behalf of Paul's brother, she calls for Kim to come out. |
| 28 March | Shopkeeper | Bill Anderson | The shopkeeper believes Danny Ramsay has stolen a cassette tape from his shop and has him detained. Danny's brother Shane Ramsay is called down to the shop and the shopkeeper asks him to pay $50. |
| 28 March | Pool Attendant | Helmut Jensen | The pool attendant gives Shane Ramsay a message from his brother. When Shane's father Max Ramsay comes by the pool, the attendant tells him Shane has been and gone. |
| 28 March–2 October | Marilyn Temple | Kassie McLuskie | Marilyn works at the Pacific Bank alongside Des Clarke and Julie Robinson. Julie briefly lives with her after her father asks her to leave home, but Marilyn finds her difficult to live with. |
| 28 March–25 April | Carol Brown | Merrin Canning | Carol lives at 30 Ramsay Street with her two children, Josie and Tommy, and unseen husband, Ted. She comes to the bank to withdraw some money, but Des Clarke tells her she is overdrawn by $300. When Daphne Lawrence moves into the street, Carol makes silent phone calls and writes poison pen letters to her, leading Des to threaten to call the police. One day Paul Robinson finds Carol passed out in her hallway after she drinks too much alcohol. Carol is attacked on her way home and Danny Ramsay rushes to help, but Carol accuses him of mugging her. Carol reports the incident to the police. Carol calls Paul and tells him that when she woke up from passing out again, she discovered that her husband had taken the children. She also tells him that a bartender had found her purse on the day she was attacked and she drops the charges against Danny. |
| 28 March–19 April | Josie Brown | Charmaine Gorman | Carol Brown's young daughter. When Danny Ramsay prevents Josie from running out into the road to collect her ball, Carol accuses him of attempting to abduct her. Later, Paul Robinson finds Josie and Tommy sitting on the front steps of Number 30, while Carol is passed out drunk inside. |
| 28 March–2 July | Gordon Miller | Red Symons | Gordon comes into Pacific Bank to look around and asks Julie Robinson for some withdrawal forms, before returning to his car and telling his accomplice that they will rob the bank in the morning. Gordon returns and holds Julie at gunpoint as she places money into a briefcase. During his getaway, he crashes into a car carrying Shane and Danny Ramsay, killing his accomplice in the process. Gordon is sent to prison. Terry Inglis later reveals that Gordon is her former husband. Gordon escapes from prison and Lucy Robinson spots him in Ramsay Street with a gun. Terry realises that Gordon is following her and she goes to Max Ramsay's bedsit, where Gordon holds them both hostage. Shane charges in to rescue them, barges Gordon and in the ensuing distraction, Max is able to disarm Gordon and grabs the gun. Max, remembering Gordon from the trial, threatens to shoot him for causing Shane's injury. Shane and Terry are able to talk Max out of doing so and call the police. Gordon is then sent back to prison. |
| 29 March–3 April | Policeman 1 | Peter Black | Policeman 1 comes to Number 24 Ramsay Street to inform Maria Ramsay that her sons have been involved in a car accident. Days later, he attends the Pacific Bank when Julie Robinson raises the alarm about a suspicious customer, who actually wanted to ask her out on a date. |
| 29 March | Policeman 2 | Steven Hutchinson | Policeman 2 attends the scene of a car crash involving brothers Shane Ramsay and Danny Ramsay. He tries to calm Danny down. |
| 29 March–1 April | Doctor Lockyer | Stephanie Daniel | Doctor Lockyer visits Danny Ramsay after he is brought into the hospital following a car accident. He asks her about his brother Shane Ramsay, but Doctor Lockyer tells him there is no news and that he will be the first to know if that changes. Doctor Lockyer meet Danny's parents Max Ramsay and Maria Ramsay and explains that Danny is fine, but Shane is fighting for his life. When Shane comes round from surgery, he tells Doctor Lockyer that he cannot breathe properly. She tells him that he has broken some ribs. She later tells Max that Shane will not be able to dive again or he could become paralysed. |
| 29 March–2 April | Nurse Laurie Stevens | Gloria Ajenstat | Nurse Stevens comes to see Danny Ramsay and attempts to cheer him up. She wants him to see his father, but Danny refuses and asks to see his mother instead. Nurse Stevens later tells Danny that his brother Shane Ramsay wants to see him, but Danny tells her he is not ready. She is credited as Nurse Stevens. |
| 29 March–1 April, 7 October | Doctor Rowlands | Tom Travers | Doctor Rowlands is the surgeon who operates on Shane Ramsay. He tells Max Ramsay, Maria Ramsay and Helen Daniels that Shane will be okay, but there is damage to his spinal cord. Doctor Rowlands carries out some tests on Shane, who cannot move his hands and feet. He tells Shane that there is some bruising around his spine. Rowlands learns that Shane's brother Danny Ramsay is refusing to eat until he knows that Shane is going to be okay. He tells Shane who is motivated to move his fingers. Rowlands later attends to Philip Martin after he and his wife Loretta Martin are involved in a car crash, which leaves Philip injured and Loretta dead. He asks Julie Robinson if he should break the news to Philip but Julie agrees to tell Philip herself. |
| 2–10 April | Peter Kirk | Peter Mochrie | A wealthy Pacific Bank customer, who develops an attraction to Julie Robinson. His behaviour makes Julie nervous, as the bank has recently been robbed, so when he later hands Julie a note, it scares her and she presses the alarm, leading to Peter being grabbed by two undercover police officers. He tells them to read the note, which is actually a letter to Julie saying he thinks he is falling in love with her. He explains that he just wants to get to know Julie better. Peter turns up on Julie's doorstep with a balloon and flowers for her as an apology, which she reluctantly accepts. Peter returns to the bank and asks Julie out to dinner, which she initially turns down, but later invites him to meet her family and friends. Peter tells Julie that he is going to marry her, as he knows she is the right girl for him, but Julie counters that they have only just met. They continue to date and Peter says he wants them to get married straight away, but Julie says she needs time to think. Peter says they can have a romantic engagement. Julie's brother Paul Robinson invites Peter to their father's engagement party, where Julie argues with Anna Rossi and slaps her. The following day, Peter asks Julie if she has apologised to Anna, as she is a wonderful lady, but Julie tells him that Anna is ruining the family. Peter wishes her the best, but he no longer wants to date her, having seen her true colours. He also tells her that she should not expect her father to give Anna up. |
| 2–11 April | Anna Rossi | Roslyn Gentle | Anna comes to Erinsborough to support her sister Maria Ramsay, after Maria's sons Shane Ramsay and Danny Ramsay are involved in a car accident. Jim Robinson invites her to his house when she finds the Ramsay house empty. Jim is attracted to Anna and asks her on multiple dates, but she eventually tells him she involved with a man named Gino in Queensland. Realising she is falling in love with Jim, she cancels her plans to return to Queensland. Julie and Lucy Robinson do not accept Anna and try to sabotage the relationship. Jim proposes to Anna, but at their engagement party Julie slaps her. Anna returns to Queensland, where she marries Gino. She later phones Jim to tell him Julie has apologised to her. |
| 19 April | Tommy Brown | Uncredited | Carol Brown's young son. Paul Robinson sees Tommy and Josie sitting outside as Carol is passed out inside. |
| 30 April–14 May | Mrs. Forbes | Gwen Plumb | When Scott Robinson and Danny Ramsay run away from home, they soon find work on Mrs Forbes' farm, where they pretend to be brothers. She offers them food and money in return for them digging her a manure pit. Mrs Forbes calls Jim Robinson to tell him that the boys are okay, but does not disclose their location, as Scott and Danny told her Jim was abusive. Mrs Forbes' husband dies and she begins to bond with Scott and Danny when they support her. However, she experiences lapses in memory and threatens the boys with a gun. Mrs Forbes agrees to sell her farm and move into a hostel. Realising Scott and Danny are not brothers, she encourages them to return home. Although the boys still wish to stay and help her retain the farm, they call Paul Robinson for advice and he tells Jim, who arrives at the farm with Helen Daniels. Mrs Forbes apologises to Jim for believing he was abusive, and shares memories of her husband with Helen. After Scott agrees to return home she convinces Danny to do the same, and waves them off sadly before moving to the hostel. |
| 6–24 May | Mr Arnold | John Murphy | Mr Arnold is the manager of the Pacific Bank. Des Clarke recommends his tenant, Daphne Lawrence, for a loan to buy his house, due to his imminent promotion and move to Canberra. When Mr Arnold learns that Daphne is a stripper, he informs head office and stops Des' promotion. He overhears Des criticising his son, Greg, and believes that he is enacting revenge for the rejection of Daphne's loan. After Greg is arrested at a party, Mr Arnold apologies to Des and offers him the assistant manager position. However, Des resigns from the bank instead. Kevin Morgan from Head Office investigates the issues caused by Greg and Mr Arnold leaves the bank, allowing Des to return as acting manager. |
| 6–24 May | Greg Arnold | John Higginson | Mr Arnold introduces Des Clarke to his son, Greg, who is beginning work at the bank. When Des shows Greg around, he immediately makes suggestive comments to Julie Robinson and Marilyn Temple. While Marilyn is wary of Greg, Julie agrees to go to dinner with him. Greg breaks the bank's computer program and blames Des for the issue. When Greg admits he blamed Des for his mistake, Des punches him in the face before Greg trips him over. Greg takes Julie to a party, where Daphne Lawrence has been hired as a stripper. Julie sees Greg's true nature and leaves, while Daphne is upset by the abusive behaviour of Greg and his friends. Des and Paul Robinson go to the party to confront Greg, and witness him being taken away in a police car. Greg then leaves his job at the bank, but shows no remorse for his behaviour. |
| 6 May | Iris Gough | Maggie Steven | Mrs Gough is a resident of Ramsay Street, who returns from a cruise holiday and catches up with Helen Daniels on the recent gossip. She outstays her welcome at Number 26, but eventually leaves after giving Helen a letter mistakenly delivered to her house. |
| 8–31 May | Nick Burman | Vic Hawkins | A pilot and old school friend of Jim Robinson and Max Ramsay. While he is visiting Jim, he learns that Max and his wife Maria have separated. He goes to see Maria and tells her Max will come round eventually, but she starts crying and her son Shane Ramsay catches the pair hugging. Nick visits Max and takes him out to the pub. He insists that Max drive them home and when he admits that he has always had feelings for Maria, Max crashes the van. Nick stays in town to try and win Maria's affection. He also advises Jim's son Paul Robinson to consider training as an air steward. Before Nick leaves for Hawaii, he asks Maria to go with him, but she turns him down as she still loves Max. Nick then visits Max and tells him to go home to Maria, but Max reveals that she told him Danny Ramsay is not his son. Nick tells Max that he cannot hold it against Maria for ever. |
| 17–22 May | Dean Canning | Barry Main | An old friend of Nick Burman. Dean is the manager of the airline Nick works for. Paul Robinson contacts him to apply for a position of an air steward after Nick puts in a word for him. Dean tells Paul that there is a waiting list and it may be a few months before he is able to secure an interview. Undeterred , Paul arrives at the office in person to see Dean, who is impressed by his determination. He then arranges for Paul to speak with personnel manager Kathy Woodfield to put him through to the next stage of recruitment. Paul is successful and subsequently hired. |
| 21 May–27 July | Edith Harris | Eve Godly | Edith is a resident and manager of a local run-down apartment complex that houses several bedsits. Her cheery attitude infuriates recently separated Max Ramsay who has moved in. However, when Edith comes to Max's defence after a neighbour accuses him of stealing her underwear, he softens towards her. Edith and Max build up a friendship and one evening when they get drunk, Max's wife Maria walks in to find Edith on Max's lap and gets the wrong idea. |
| 21 May 1985 – 3 February 1987 | Basil | | Lucy Robinson's terrier. After rescuing another dog, Patch, after a hit-and-run, Lucy is disappointed to learn he has a real owner and she cannot keep him. Jim Robinson refuses to get the family a dog, as their previous dog, Digby, was a victim of dog baiting. However, he relents when seeing the bond between Patch and his elderly owner. Jim, Helen Daniels, Julie Robinson and Lucy visit the RSPCA Animal Adoption centre to find a dog for Lucy. She spots a puppy in a kennel and declares that it is the one for her. Lucy decides to name the puppy Basil despite her being female. Basil helps Lucy's family find her when she falls down a drain. Months later, during a trip to the beach, Basil jumps off the pier chasing a bird. Mike Young attempts to save Basil, but she drowns after getting stuck under one of the posts. Lucy initially blames Mike for Basil's death because he did not go with her straight away when she asked for his help. The Robinsons bury Basil in their garden. |
| 22–23 May | Kathy Woodfield | Kereen Ely-Harper | Kathy is the Head of Personnel at the airline Paul Robinson applies to. She scrutinizes Paul's motivation to become an Air Steward and suggests he may be dropping out of his Engineering Undergraduate Degree to go against his father Jim Robinson's wishes. Paul denies the accusations. Dean Canning enters the room and mentions to Paul that it's Kathy first day. Kathy apologises to Paul and puts him through to the next round of interviews, suggesting he stick with his studies for the time being. The following morning, Kathy phones Paul to tell him another interview slot is available for that day and he agrees. Paul's second interview is successful and he is hired. |
| 23–30 May | Miss Logan | Alethea McGrath | A Neighbour of Max Ramsay who lives across the hall at his apartment complex. She accuses Max of stealing her underwear from the washing line and her milk from her doorstep. Edith Harris, the resident manager explains she took Miss Logan's underwear off the line and into her apartment as she thought it would rain. Logan is still wary of Max and later blames him for loud music late at night when in fact, the couple who live in the room next to him are responsible. She later accuses Max of spying on her in the communal bathroom. |
| 24–28 May | Steve O'Donnel | Greg Fleet | Steve moves into the bedsit opposite Max Ramsay. Edith Harris tries to get to know him, but he refuses to let her in, prompting suspicion. When the police investigate some residents who have fled without paying, Steve panics. When Max arrives home, he is shocked to find a baby in his room. Steve admits the child is his daughter, Christine and tells Max and Edith that he has taken her following an argument with his wife, Kerry. Steve explains that the marriage is suffering because he feels that Kerry's parents do not respect him and he plans to go north with Christine. Max is able to talk Steve round and he calls Kerry. Edith agrees to look after Christine but Christine accidentally finds Edith's sleeping pills and swallows some. Edith and Max rush Christine to hospital. Christine is examined and no damage has been done much to Edith and Max's relief. They bring Christine home to Steve and Kerry who have reconciled but do not mention the hospital incident. Steve and Kerry explain that they have spoken to Kerry's parents and have agreed to move back in with them. Before leaving, The O'Donnels thank Max and Edith with a bottle of wine. |
| 24–28 May | Christine O'Donnel | Amalie Rosza | |
| 28 May | Kerry O'Donnel | Jacqui Gordon | |
| 27–28 May | Kevin Morgan | Howard Bell | Kevin is a representative of Head Office for Pacific Bank. He arrives at the Erinsborough branch to meet with Mr Arnold. He leads an internal investigation into a credit analysis error which was mistakenly attributed to Des Clarke. Kevin interviews several of Des' colleagues at the bank, including Julie Robinson. The following day, Kevin arrives at Number 28 to return Des' resignation, apologises to Des and tells him Arnold should not have accepted it without consulting head office. Kevin offers Des the position acting manager and He accepts. |
| 29–30 May | Victor Armstrong | Frank Wilson | Victor contacts Helen Daniels, forty years after they last met. Helen's grandsons tease her and suggest she may be in love with Victor. Victor presents as wealthy, but after bumping into Julie Robinson at the Pacific Bank she learns that he is running out of money. Victor confesses to Helen, and tells her that he has not seen his daughter, Margaret, for fourteen years, after she fell pregnant to Phillip Newman at a young age. Helen contacts Margaret, and they reunite. After meeting his grandchildren for the first time, Victor is invited to live with Margaret's family. |
| 30 May | Margaret Newman | Suzanne Heywood | |
| 30 May | Phillip Newman | David G. Bergin | |
| 30 May | Bobby Newman | Mitchell Bartlett | |
| 30 May | Mandy Newman | Doir Deumer | |
| 3–7 June | Josie | Cindy Lee | Kim Taylor's heavily pregnant homeless friend. Brad arranges to sell her baby after it is born. After giving birth, Josie realises she cannot sell her baby and convinces Kim to reconsider her own plans. |
| 4–7 June 1985, 26 October 2016, 23 February 2017 | Bradley Satchwell | Rick Ireland; Alfred Nicdao | Brad is Kim Taylor's boyfriend, who she believes is the father of her unborn baby. Brad tells Kim he has a plan for her and the baby. He warns Scott Robinson to stay away from Kim, as she is coming back with him and selling their baby. Kim changes her mind and tells Brad that she will not sell the baby. Scott's brother Paul threatens to report Brad to the police, before throwing him out of Kim's flat. In 2016, Kim's son David Tanaka comes looking for Bradley at an industrial estate, as he believes Bradley might be his father. Bradley attacks him, but he is injured and David calls his twin brother Leo Tanaka to help look for him. David finds Bradley and he and Leo get him to the hospital, where Bradley recognises a picture of their mother. He later leaves the hospital. Months later, Leo and Amy Williams track down Bradley, and Leo offers him $300 to come to the hospital to see David. Amy asks David to check out Bradley's bruises. As Leo goes to find Bradley some food, he disappears from the hospital once again. David later confirms to Leo that a blood test shows Bradley is not their father. When it is later revealed that Paul is David and Leo's father, it is mentioned that Kim was in a relationship with Bradley earlier in 1985, shortly before the twins were conceived. |
| 5 June 1985 – 15 July 1986 | Harry Henderson | Johnny Lockwood | Harry is Daphne Lawrence's grandfather, a serial womaniser who imposes his presence on 28 Ramsay Street on multiple occasions in 1985. He later takes over the Coffee Shop when he wins it in a poker game, leaving Daphne in charge when he leaves town again. He leaves Daphne a note urging her to marry Des Clarke. Harry returns for Daphne's wedding to Des the following year. |
| 6–7 June | Cleo Jones | Denise Kirby | A telephonist at a senior centre, who meets Harry Henderson and allows him to take her out for the day. The pair try to win the raffle at the centre, as the prize is a trip around the world, but they end up winning a trip to the Gold Coast when they become the 10,000th customers in the restaurant they select for lunch. Harry returns to Erinsborough with Yvette, after Cleo stays on the Gold Coast. |
| 7 June | Tim Duncan | Nick Carrafa | Danny Ramsay's biological father, who is seen in a flashback when Maria Ramsay tells her son Shane the truth about Danny's parentage. |
| 10–14 June | Peter Sherwin | Keir Saltmarsh | Pete is the older brother of Eddie Sherwin, a friend of Danny Ramsay. He pretends to be the owner of a local hall, so Danny's mother, Maria, will let Danny have an unsupervised 16th birthday party there. Pete ruins the party by inviting his shady friends and dealing drugs. Pete spikes Danny's drink, which causes him to collapse. Scott Robinson devises a plan to catch Pete by pretending to be interested in the drugs he is selling. Pete is caught by Jim Robinson and Max Ramsay. He is then arrested. |
| 17–18 June | Yvette | Denise Drysdale | A topless waitress, who Harry Henderson helps when he notices she is having trouble with a man. Harry gives her a return ticket to Melbourne. Grateful to Harry, Yvette takes him out to dinner, but explains that she has a boyfriend, Tiger Thomas, so they can only be friends. Tiger discovers Yvette out with Harry and they argue. Yvette calls Harry's granddaughter Daphne Lawrence to tell her to come to the hospital, where she explains that Harry defended her and used his kung fu skills on Tiger. |
| 18 June | Tiger Thomas | Stephen Millichamp | A boxer and Yvette's boyfriend. When he finds her having dinner with Harry Henderson, a fight breaks out and Tiger is hospitalised. Yvette tells Harry's granddaughter Daphne Lawrence that Harry defended her using kung fu. Tiger says he will sue Harry, until Des Clarke points out that being beaten up by an old man would not do his reputation any good. Tiger realises that Des is right and decides to forget the incident. |
| 18–19 June | Margaret Hayward | Judith McGrath | From the deck of the QE2, American film star Margaret Hayward calls Number 28 Ramsay Street and asks Daphne Lawrence if she can speak to her grandfather Harry Henderson. Daphne tells Margaret that Harry has gone out and she will get him to call her back. Margaret gives Daphne her number and insists that Harry gets her message. Daphne and Des Clarke fail to find Harry, but Margaret shows up on their doorstep to let them know Harry is outside in her limo. Margaret says she and Harry are old friends and that he will accompany her on the rest of her cruise. |
| 19–21 June | Gloria Slater | Linda Hartley | Gloria dates Paul Robinson and they enjoy each other's company. Despite Paul's family liking Gloria, trouble ensues when Paul's father, Jim realises that she is the daughter of Charlie Slater, whom he had attended university with. Jim is hostile towards Gloria and Paul presses Jim for answers but he will not give any information. It transpires Charlie had stole an idea Jim for once had for a suspension bridge and profited from it. Paul and Gloria continue to date and at the end of one evening they come to find Gloria's mother, Emily, crying outside in her dressing gown. Emily explains Charlie had gotten drunk and thrown her out and it was not the first time. Paul tries to reason with Charlie but finds himself thrown out, so he takes Emily and Gloria back to Ramsay Street for the night. Emily decides to leave Charlie. The next day, Charlie apologises to Emily and tries to convince her and Gloria to return home. When Emily tells him she wants a divorce he moves to strike her, but Jim intervenes. Emily and Gloria then leave for Adelaide. |
| 20–21 June | Charlie Slater | Gary Down | |
| 20–21 June | Emily Slater | Diana Greentree | |
| 24–28 June | Linda Fielding | Deborra-Lee Furness | Linda is the CEO of Fielding Enterprises. She hires Shane Ramsay to work for her as a chauffeur. When Shane's father Max overhears Linda booking a hotel for her and Shane, he jumps to conclusions but Shane sets him straight. Shane drops Linda off to a private hospital, she orders him to stay outside but when an urgent call comes through on the car phone, Shane goes into the hospital where he finds Linda talking to her sick husband, Dan. Although annoyed at Shane for interrupting her private time with her husband, Linda agrees to give him a final chance. Dan dies of a heart attack later that day, leaving Linda devastated. Shane stays overnight on the couch to make sure Linda is not alone. Linda then decides to leave Erinsborough to move up north to live out her and Dan's retirement dream. |
| 27 June | Dan Fielding | George Dixon | Dan is Linda Fielding's husband. He is paralysed following a car accident several years earlier caused by a joyriding teenager. Linda takes over his business and is devastated when he dies of a heart attack the day before his 60th birthday. |
| 1–19 July | Wendy Gibson | Kylie Foster | Wendy arrives in Ramsay Street and tells Maria Ramsay that her sister, Anna Rossi told her to call in. Danny Ramsay invites Wendy to stay with them. Wendy dates both Danny and Scott Robinson. Anna tells Maria that Wendy was meant to stay with friends, but she ran away. Daphne Lawrence sets Wendy up after she sees her dating both Danny and Scott. She asks a friend to take her out on a date and then leave her at the station. |
| 9–20 July 1985, 11 February 1993 | Loretta Martin | Lyn Semler; Jane Bayly | Loretta is Philip Martin's first wife and mother to Debbie and Michael. Loretta is an alcoholic, who makes Philip's life hell. When she finds out that Philip is seeing Julie Robinson, Loretta tells Julie that Phil is hers. Loretta is killed in a car accident later in 1985, after which Julie and Philip reunite. Philip eventually tells Debbie and Michael that Loretta caused the crash while drunk. In 1993, Philip has a nightmare about the accident. |
| 10 July–14 August | Joan Langdon | Catherine Lynch | A woman who dates Des Clarke. They become engaged in a matter of weeks. Joan introduces Des to her children, Rodney and Susan, who take a shine to him. However, the engagement is short-lived as Joan returns to her ex-husband Geoff, with their children, leaving Des devastated. |
| 10 July–14 August | Rodney Langdon | Glendon Vernon | A woman who dates Des Clarke. They become engaged in a matter of weeks. Joan introduces Des to her children, Rodney and Susan, who take a shine to him. However, the engagement is short-lived as Joan returns to her ex-husband Geoff, with their children, leaving Des devastated. |
| 10 July–14 August | Susan Langdon | Nerolee Vernon | A woman who dates Des Clarke. They become engaged in a matter of weeks. Joan introduces Des to her children, Rodney and Susan, who take a shine to him. However, the engagement is short-lived as Joan returns to her ex-husband Geoff, with their children, leaving Des devastated. |
| 11 July–18 October | Wally Walters | Reg Gorman | Wally is the owner of a Mexican restaurant where Scott Robinson gets a part-time job. Wally loses the restaurant's lease to Harry Henderson in a poker game. |
| 12–17 July | Robert Hutchins | David Robson | Robert dates Maria Ramsay, who has recently separated from her husband Max. Maria's son, Danny is unhappy about her seeing Robert. Maria agrees to go out with Robert again and at the end of their date, he walks her back home which is witnessed by Max who angrily confronts Robert. Robert then punches Max, thinking that he was a random attacker. Max gets up and goes for Robert a second time but is restrained by Jim Robinson and his other, son Shane. Maria then explains that Max is her husband and Robert Leaves |
| 18–19 July | Tim | Mark Neal | Tim is a friend of Daphne Lawrence, who enlsits his help to teach Wendy Gibson a lesson for playing Scott Robinson and Danny Ramsay off against each other when they compete for her affections. Tim claims to have known Wendy through mutual friends in Queensland and asks her out on a date, which she accepts. The following day, Wendy is ready to return home waits for Tim who agreed to go back up North with her at the bus station but he keeps her waiting and Wendy leaves after realising that she has been stood up. Tim tells Daphne the plan to give Wendy a taste of her own medicine worked. When Daphne offers to reimburse Tim for the money he spent on his date with Wendy, he declines and tells Daphne that she and Father Kevin Barry helped him to get his life sorted out and is happy to repay the favour. |
| 22–23 July | Bernie Sutton | Jason DeGiorgio | A family living at 30 Ramsay Street. Bernie is given a new bike by his parents and he rides it everywhere. Jim Robinson knocks Bernie down when he comes towards him, but Bernie is not harmed. Bob explains that he told Bernie to ride towards oncoming traffic and Jim tries to teach Bernie road safety. Bob tells him to stay out of other people's business, and Jan sides with her husband. Bernie is later knocked down and killed while riding his bike on a main road. After the funeral, Bob apologises to Jim. The Suttons later leave the area. |
| 22–24 July | Bob Sutton | Chris Waters | |
| 23 July | Jan Sutton | JoAnne Rankin | |
| 30 July–11 September | Richard Morrison | Peter Flett | Richard is an insurance assessor, who falls in love with Maria Ramsay. Maria chooses him over her family and they move to Hong Kong together. However, they soon split up and Maria reconciles with her husband, Max Ramsay. |
| 9–14 August | Geoff Langdon | Daryl Pellizzer | Geoff is Joan Langdon's ex-husband and the father of their children, Rodney and Susan. Geoff reappears when Joan becomes engaged to Des Clarke and apologises for walking out on her and the children and has now become a farmer and wants to see his son and daughter again. Joan is resistant to let Geoff see Rodney and Susan but relents only if he agrees to tell the children that he is their uncle. Geoff agrees and professes his love for Joan, which angers her. Geoff takes the children while they are being babysat prompting Joan to worry. Joan then realises she still loves Geoff and breaks Des' heart by reuniting with Geoff and they move to the farm with the children. |
| 15–23 August | Amy Medway | Paula Duncan | Amy is an old school friend of Max Ramsay and Jim Robinson. Amy writes to Max and he asks her out to dinner. He leaves the restaurant before she turns up. Amy later meets up with Jim and they share a kiss before she leaves for England. |
| 16 –19 August | Colin Adamson | Peter Craig | Ian Burns' neighbour. He speaks to Daphne Lawrence who is housesitting for Ian, who tells him that there may have been an intruder. Following a rock through the window, Colin comes over the investigate and offers to stay with Daphne until her boyfriend Shane Ramsay arrives. Shane becomes suspicious of Colin especially with a suspected prowler on the loose but Daphne tells him there is no need to be. Colin invites Daphne for breaksfast The real culprit is revealed to be Ian's teenage daughter, Rachel. |
| 19 August–2 September | Liz Harrington | Brenda Clarke | Liz comes looking for Shane Ramsay but is told by his father Max that he is not home. Liz asks Max to pass on a message, which he does. A few weeks later, Liz arranges to meet Shane and they stay out all night. Shane's girlfriend, Daphne Lawrence confronts him and he explains that he has been giving Liz driving lessons and admits to falling asleep at her place but nothing happened. In spite of this, Daphne breaks up with Shane. |
| 20–28 August | Rachel Burns | Nadine Garner | Daphne Lawrence finds Rachel when she is housesitting. Rachel tells her that her father, Ian owns the house and that she is there because she hates her mother's new husband. Daphne tells Rachel that she can stay for a while. Daphne and Rachel start to get on well. Rachel's father turns up and Rachel runs away, but Daphne finds her. Rachel's stepfather, Don Truscott and mother, Margaret arrive and Rachel tells them that she wants to live with Ian and she leaves with him. |
| 23–28 August | Ian Burns | Jon Sidney | Ian is Rachel Burns' father. He hires Daphne Lawrence to house-sit for him while he is overseas for three months. However, his trip his cut short when he learns Rachel has turned up. It becomes clear that their relationship is difficult as Ian is away most of the time. Things come to a head when Daphne diffuses an argument between Ian, his ex-wife Margaret and her new husband Don Truscott. Rachel then decides to live with her father full-time while visiting Margaret and Don on occasion, to the satisfaction of all three parties. Ian is grateful and offers Daphne tenancy for as long as she wants but she declines and returns to Ramsay Street. |
| 27–28 August | Don Truscott | Ian Walker | Margaret and Don are Rachel Burns' respective mother and stepfather whom she lives with. Rachel's father, Ian calls them to attend a meeting about Rachel. Don arrives first as Margaret is held up and he and Ian are relatively civil to each other, even with the revelation that Don struck Rachel when she destroyed some of his work. However, when Margaret arrives an argument ensues and Daphne Lawrence shuts it down by telling the three of them that they are selfish and that this is hurting Rachel. After a talk, Rachel decides she wants to live with Ian but agrees to stay Margaret and Don at the weekends, holidays or whenever Ian is away. |
| 27–28 August | Margaret Truscott | Meg Clancy | |
| 4–5 September | Simon Walters | Shane Lee | Wally Walters' son. He is tasked with supervising Scott Robinson on his first shift at his father's restaurant but the minute Wally leaves, Simon disappears, leaving Scott alone to cope with rowdy customers. Scott calls Danny Ramsay, who brings Scott's father Jim and Julie to help and they are able to calm things down. When Simon returns, Jim and Julie are unimpressed and leave him to deal with the washing up. |
| 10–12 September | Betty Morant | Marcia McArthur | A Celebrant who arrives to conduct the wedding of Paul Robinson and Terry Inglis at Number 26. She prepares to conduct the rehearsal but Paul has not returned from Singapore, so Shane Ramsay agrees to stand in Paul's stead. Betty makes a comment that Shane and Terry make a lovely couple, unaware of their history together, which makes things awkward. However, The rehearsal is successful and the following day, Paul returns and Betty marries him and Terry in front of their friends of their family. |
| 10–12 September | Gwen Simpson | Marie Redshaw | Gwen is Helen Daniels's sister. She and Helen had fallen out during their childhood and they were estranged for years. Julie Robinson invites Gwen to her brother's, Paul Robinson's wedding. Helen avoids Gwen when she arrives, but Gwen speaks to Jim Robinson about her regret at not knowing her sister anymore. At the reception, Gwen reveals that she allowed Helen to take the blame for a theft at school. Gwen and Helen then shake hands. |
| 11–12 September | Aunt Daisy | Paddy Burnet | Jim Robinson's maternal aunt, who attends Paul Robinson's wedding to Terry Inglis. Daisy struggles to hear the ceremony, and is unsure when the couple become married. Eileen Clarke tells her about her son, Des Clarke's recent jilting, and Daisy comments that Joan Langdon must not have loved him. She warns Terry not to be a "liberated" woman, as like his father Paul wants a traditional wife. When a telegram from her sister, Bess Robinson, is read out, Daisy reacts dismissively. |
| 11 September–5 November | Charles Durham | Ross Thompson | Charles shows up in Ramsay Street for Terry Inglis's wedding. He and his accomplice, Barbara Hill, want to retrieve an incriminating tape. They break into Terry's old house and send threatening notes. Charles decides to get rid of Terry, but when Daphne Lawrence borrows Terry's coat, Charles almost runs her down. Terry confronts Charles and shoots him dead. |
| 13 September–5 November | Barbara Hill | Louise Le Nay | Barbara is Charles Durham's girlfriend and accomplice. She finds his body after Terry Inglis shoots him, but she reports Daphne Lawrence to the police instead. |
| 19 September | Amanda Blake | Linda McConchie | When Jim Robinson suspects Douglas Blake is married, he goes to his house to confront him. Jim sees Douglas leaving the house with a younger woman and is embarrassed when Douglas introduces her as his younger sister, Amanda. |
| 19 September–2 October | Bess Robinson | June Salter | Bess is Jim Robinson's mother. She arrives to see her grandson, Paul marry Terry Inglis. Jim is uncomfortable having Bess around. Bess almost collapses and she tells Scott that she is dying. Jim tells Bess how unhappy he was as a child because she used to leave him with relatives. Jim forgives his mother when he finds out she is dying. Bess dies in 1988. |
| 23 September–2 October | Edward Wingram | Geoffrey Pullan | A Solicitor and an old friend of Bess Robinson. She arranges the meet him to take care of her affairs, which include arranging for heirlooms to be bequeathed to her son, Jim and his children. Edward tells he will miss her and arrives at the Robinsons' the next day to get Bess' signature on a few forms and inadvertently lets slip to Jim about Bess' illness, which forces her to reveal to him that she is dying. |
| 2 October–5 November | Sarah Richards | Julia McDougall | Sarah is Des Clarke's cousin. She begins working at the Pacific Bank alongside him and manages to annoy his lodger Daphne Lawrence when she comes to stay. Sarah's presence is a source of irritation for several of Des's neighbours. She is chosen as the face of the bank and throws a party to celebrate, bossing around the neighbours throughout its preparation. The party is abandoned when the police arrive to question Daphne about Charles Durham's murder, after which Sarah immediately moves out in disgust. |
| 3 October–7 November | Kate Drew | Susannah Lobez | Kate is Danny Ramsay's French teacher at Erinsborough High School. She dates his father, Max, following an altercation about his marks, which they keep a secret from Danny and Shane Ramsay. Danny and Shane visit the Coffee Shop while Max and Kate are on a date there, and Danny overhears Max telling Kate that he is not Danny's biological father. |
| 4 October 1985 – 27 January 1989 | Larry Spencer | Elwyn Bradshaw; Stephen Cross | Larry is a teller who works at the Pacific Bank with Des Clarke. |
| 9–10 October | Audrey Gibbs | Ruth Jaffe | The owner of a local art gallery. Audrey informs Helen Daniels that Douglas Blake has cancelled her exhibition on her behalf. |
| 22–31 October | Fiona | Uncredited | A young employee of the Pacific Bank. Fiona offers to sing for Danny Ramsay and Scott Robinson's band, but her singing is so bad they remove her voice from their demo recordings. She later competes with Sarah Richards to be the face of the bank. |
| 24 October – 1 November 1985, 7–20 April 1988 | Ross Warner | Rod McLennan; Tim Hughes | Ross is Jim Robinson's business partner. He works on a new project with Jim, before they are conned by Douglas Blake. Years later, Ross offers Jim's son Scott some work at his office. Scott discovers that Ross is corrupt, but Jim is unconvinced. Scott and his wife, Charlene, expose Ross, and Jim is shocked to discover that Ross has been embezzling from the business account. Ross is then arrested. |
