= Ramsay family =

Fictional family in the Australian TV soap Neighbours

- Neighbours family
- First appearance: 18 March 1985
- Created by: Reg Watson
- Introduced by: Reg Watson (1985); Stanley Walsh (1996); Ric Pellizzeri (2005); Susan Bower (2009); Jason Herbison (2019)
- Duration: 1985–1992, 1996–2001, 2005, 2009–2016, 2019–
- Spin-offs: Neighbours: The Untold Stories: The Ramsays – A Family Divided (1989)

The Ramsay family is a fictional family from the Australian soap opera Neighbours. The family were one of three central families created by Reg Watson and introduced in the first episode of Neighbours in March 1985. Watson wanted the Ramsays to be humorous and rougher than the Robinson family. Ramsay Street, a cul-de-sac which is the central setting of the series, is named after the family. In 2001, the last Ramsay, Madge (Anne Charleston), departed the series. Eight years later, a new generation of the Ramsay family was introduced.

== Creation and development ==
The Ramsay family were one of three central families introduced to viewers when Neighbours began in 1985, created by the show's creator and executive producer Reg Watson. Unlike the Robinsons, Watson wanted "humour and likeable roughness" with the Ramsay family. Josephine Monroe, author of The Neighbours Programme Guide, wrote "The Ramsays are the royal family of Neighbours and their claim on Erinsborough goes back generations." The family originally consisted of Max Ramsay (Francis Bell), his wife Maria Ramsay (Dasha Blahova), and their two sons Shane Ramsay (Peter O'Brien) and Danny Ramsay (David Clencie). The family lived at No. 24 Ramsay Street, one of the original three houses on Neighbours.

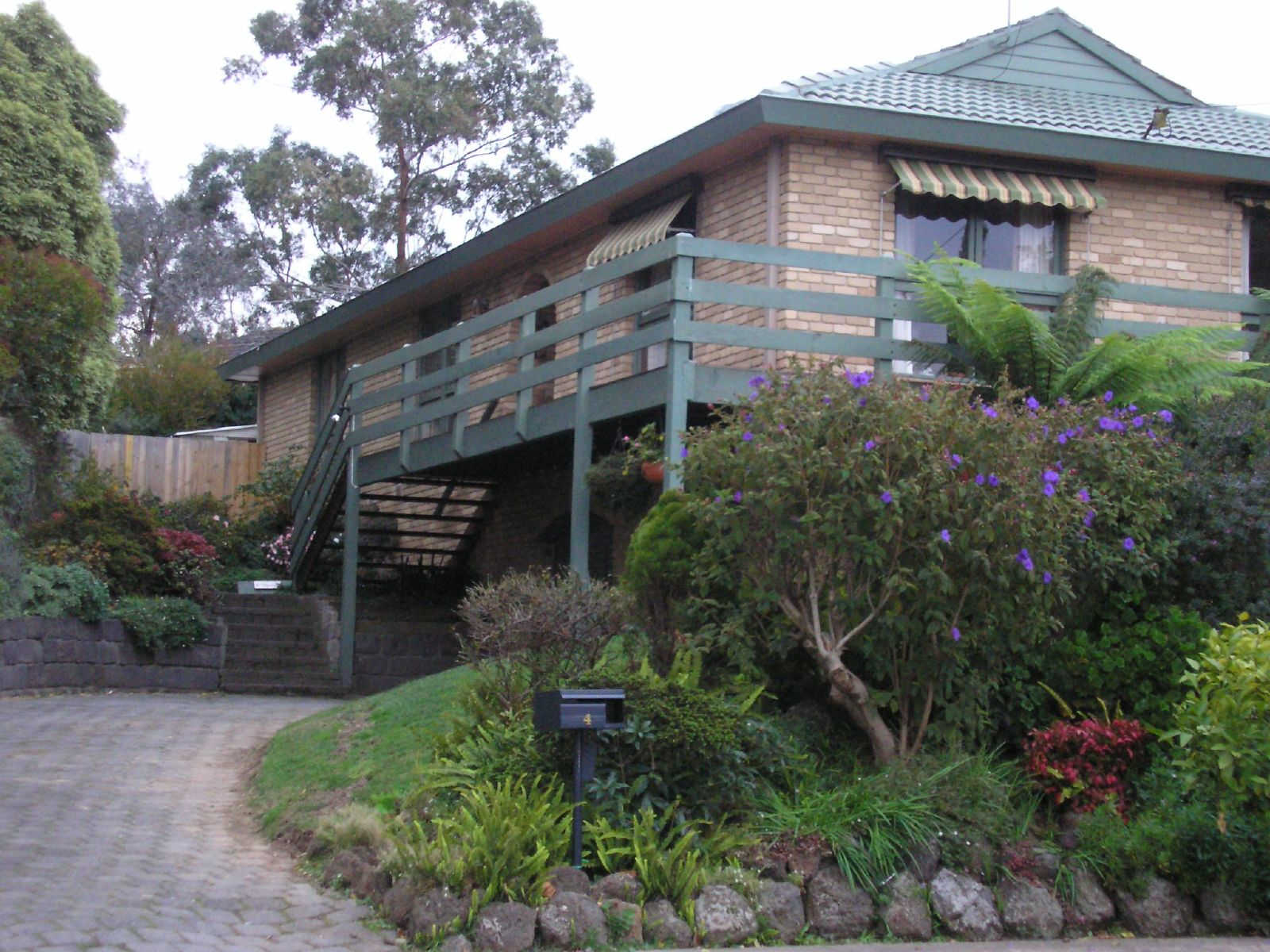
Number 24 has been associated with the Ramsay family since 1985.

The family were friendly with the Robinsons, but tension briefly developed between the two families when Jim Robinson (Alan Dale) began dating Maria's sister Anna Rossi (Roslyn Gentle). Maria was the first member of the family to leave the show, with Danny and Max following shortly after. The producers then decided to introduce some new Ramsays in the form of Max's sister Madge Mitchell (Anne Charleston) and their brother Tom Ramsay (Gary Files), who took over Max's planned storylines. Shane's departure made way for Madge's children Charlene Mitchell (Kylie Minogue) and Henry Ramsay (Craig McLachlan), who arrived in 1986 and 1987 respectively. Charlene's romance with Scott Robinson (Jason Donovan) had become popular with Neighbours viewers, who dubbed them "TV's Romeo and Juliet" because they were from feuding families. Their wedding in "Episode 523" famously united the Ramsay and Robinson families. In 2001, Madge, the last remaining Ramsay on the street, died, after Charleston quit the show.

In February 2009, it was announced that a new generation of the Ramsay family would be introduced to the show. At the time, the Ramsays had not appeared in Neighbours for almost a decade. Executive producer Susan Bower said the introduction of the new Ramsay family members was based on the American drama series Party of Five. Paul Robinson's (Stefan Dennis) daughter Elle Robinson (Pippa Black) discovered that Max had a secret daughter with Paul's mother Anne. The affair was kept a secret due to the feud between their families, and Anne moved away with her daughter Jill Ramsay (Peri Cummings). As a result, Elle tracked down Jill and met her three children; Kate Ramsay (Ashleigh Brewer), Harry Ramsay (Will Moore) and Sophie Ramsay (Kaiya Jones). When Jill was killed in a hit and run accident, Kate, Harry and Sophie move to Ramsay Street and eventually become close with their uncle Paul. They lived at No. 24, like the original Ramsays, until it was sold off and Kate and Sophie moved in with Paul. Since then, all three have departed the soap. Charlene and Scott's son, Daniel Robinson (Tim Phillipps) was introduced on 29 April 2014. Two years later, his sister, Madison Robinson (Sarah Ellen), was introduced, and he was written out with his wife, Imogen Willis (Ariel Kaplan). In 2019, producers introduced Gemma Ramsay's (Beth Buchanan) daughter Roxy Willis (Zima Anderson), which leads to a short return for Gemma.

On 1 October 2024, it was announced that the Ramsay family would return with the introduction of Shane's son Max Ramsay (Ben Jackson). The show's official Instagram account posted "After 10 years, a Ramsay is back on Ramsay Street! We're thrilled to announce that Ben Jackson will soon be joining the cast as Max Ramsay. But what's brought a member of the show's original family back to Erinsborough? All will be revealed..." O'Brien was also confirmed to be returning for a guest stint.

== Family members ==
- Unnamed Ramsay, married an unknown woman
  - Fred Ramsay
    - Roger Adair; son of Fred and Agnes Adair (née Robinson), raised as the son of Richard Adair, married an unknown woman
      - Unnamed Adair, married an unknown woman
        - Agnes Adair, granddaughter of Roger, married to William
          - Jacqueline, daughter of Agnes and William
  - Jack Ramsay; married an unknown woman
    - Maud Ramsay; daughter of Jack
    - Dan Ramsay; son of Jack; married Edna Wilkins
      - Max Ramsay; son of Dan and Edna; married Maria Rossi
        - Jill Ramsay; daughter of Max and Anne Robinson
          - Kate Ramsay; daughter of Jill and Patrick Mooney
          - Harry Ramsay; son of Jill and Patrick
          - Sophie Ramsay; daughter of Jill and Patrick
        - Shane Ramsay; son of Max and Maria; married Yvette Ramsay
          - Max Ramsay; son of Shane and Yvette
          - Saskia Ramsay; daughter of Shane and Yvette
        - Danny Ramsay; son of Maria and Tim Duncan; adopted by Max
      - Tom Ramsay; son of Dan and Edna; married Doreen Leicester
        - Moira Ramsay; daughter of Tom and Doreen; married to Mr. Harrigan
          - Holly Harrigan; daughter of Moira and Mr Harrigan
        - Gemma Ramsay; daughter of Tom and Doreen; married Adam Willis
          - Roxy Willis; daughter of Gemma and Adam; married Kyle Canning
            - Jett Canning; son of Roxy and Kyle
      - Madge Ramsay; daughter of Dan and Edna; married Fred Mitchell; married Harold Bishop
        - Henry Ramsay; son of Madge and Fred; married to Bronwyn Davies
        - Charlene Mitchell; daughter of Madge and Fred; married Scott Robinson
          - Daniel Robinson; son of Charlene and Scott; married Imogen Willis
          - Madison Robinson; daughter of Charlene and Scott

== Reception ==
In her book, Neighbours: The First 10 Years, Josephine Monroe observed that the Ramsays were "a good foil to the better bred Robinsons". The Sydney Morning Herald's Robin Oliver branded the family "raucous". Andrew Mercado, author of Super Aussie Soaps, believed the family were once "the backbone of the show". In her book Soap opera, Dorothy Hobson describes the family as "more working class than other characters" and stated: "They had working-class jobs but were not represented as cloth cap wearing or dowdy, they were bright and modern and representative of a vibrant and working population."

== See also ==
- Ramsay Street

== Bibliography ==
- Monroe, Josephine (1994). The Neighbours Programme Guide. Virgin Books. ISBN 978-0-86369-831-6.
- Monroe, Josephine (1996). Neighbours: The First 10 Years. Penguin Group. ISBN 978-0-7181-4212-4.
- Mercado, Andrew (2004). Super Aussie Soaps: Behind the Scenes of Australia's Best Loved TV Shows. Pluto Press Australia. ISBN 978-1-86403-191-1.
