= Julie Martin (Neighbours) =

Fictional character from Neighbours

- Neighbours character
- Julie Mullins as Julie Martin (1994)
- Portrayed by: Vikki Blanche (1985); Julie Mullins (1992–1994)
- Duration: 1985, 1992–1994
- First appearance: 18 March 1985
- Last appearance: 3 October 1994
- Created by: Reg Watson
- Introduced by: Reg Watson (1985); Don Battye (1992)
- Spin-off appearances: Neighbours vs Time Travel (2017)
- Vikki Blanche as Julie Martin (1985)
In-universe information
- Other names: Julie Robinson
- Occupation: Bank teller; Secretary; Newsagent; Used car salesperson; Student
- Family: Robinson
- Father: Roger Bannon
- Mother: Anne Robinson
- Adoptive father: Jim Robinson
- Half-brothers: Roger Bannon Jr.; Paul Robinson; Scott Robinson; Glen Donnelly (adoptive)
- Half-sisters: Jill Ramsay; Lucy Robinson
- Husband: Philip Martin (1986–1994)
- Daughters: Hannah Martin
- Stepsons: Michael Martin
- Stepdaughters: Debbie Martin
- Grandfathers: Bill Daniels; James Robinson
- Grandmothers: Helen Daniels; Bess Robinson
- Aunts: Rosemary Daniels
- Nephews: Andrew Robinson
- Other relatives: Wayne Duncan

Julie Martin (also Robinson) is a fictional character from the Australian soap opera Neighbours. Originally played by Vikki Blanche, she made her first screen appearance during the show's first episode broadcast on 18 March 1985. The character departed in the same year. When she returned in 1992, Julie Mullins took over the role. Julie married Philip Martin and became his children's stepmother. Julie and Philip also had a daughter, Hannah. Julie's storylines have included struggling to befriend her stepson, her crumbling marriage and the discovery that she is a product of rape. Julie was portrayed as a busybody and gossip.

== Casting ==
Julie is one of the twelve original regular characters conceived by the creator and then executive producer of Neighbours, Reg Watson. Casting director Jan Russ was tasked with finding the actors to play the original cast, with the majority chosen for their comedic skills. Vikki Blanche was cast as Julie when she was 18. She had graduated from the National Theatre drama school in November 1984 and was cast the following month. Blanche did not think she would win the role so soon after leaving school, so she "clowned around" at the audition. She stated "I always thought I would have to work my way up in this industry, so I didn't really take the audition very seriously. I had an idea for a character floating around in the back of my head, so I decided to combine it with what I'd been told about Julie – and went completely over the top!" Blanche began filming for the serial at the HSV-7 studios in Melbourne on 2 January 1985. She admitted that accepting the breakthrough role of Julie meant "a lot of thinking and decision-making" beforehand. She explained "People assume you just jump at a chance like that, but in a way it's a worry. I felt I was being thrown in at the deep end. I wasn't that thrilled at first. I've seen so many go into series, then I never saw them again." However, she expressed her hope that the role would be long-term, as she enjoyed her character and working with the show's cast and crew. Blanche also said that due to her workload, she had lost touch with her drama school friends and her social life was non-existent outside of those she worked with. She added "After playing a character all the week I just want to stop and catch up with myself at weekends." Blanche made her debut appearance in the show's first episode, broadcast on 18 March 1985.

After seven months in the role, Blanche decided to leave Neighbours, becoming the second regular cast member to do so. James Oram, author of Neighbours Behind the Scenes, noted that Blanche wanted more than the show could offer and she did not want to be typecast. Blanche also explained that when the serial began, she knew that she did not want to stay for the full twelve months of her contract. She continued: "I learnt a lot from Neighbours but it also retards your development staying in the same role for so long. I want to make sure I experience as much as possible so I know what I want."

In 1992, Neighbours underwent a major overhaul and it took on "a darker, more adult tone". Script editor Barbara Angell explained that they wanted to appeal to a much wider audience and show that suburbia in Australia was "interesting and diverse". Several new characters were introduced, while others were written out, including Todd Landers (Kristian Schmid) whose death led to the reintroduction of Julie, now played by Julie Mullins, and her family. Mullins was planning to base herself in London when she learned she had been cast as Julie. Mullins was in her twenties at the time of her casting, and as the character was meant to be in her mid-30s, the actress was aged using conservative clothes and a short, curled hairstyle.

== Development ==
=== Characterisation ===
Julie, as played by Mullins, is described as obnoxious and unable to keep her nose out of other people's business. She has a "brusque and pompous manner", which annoys those around her. As a mother Julie is embarrassing, humiliating her children with her antics. Her persona means she finds it hard to hold a job because she is never suited to anything she tries. She firewalls herself with these traits, as she genuinely has a good heart but refuses to show it, and consequently is disliked by almost everyone she encounters.

=== Departure ===
After two years of playing Julie, Mullins decided to leave Neighbours in 1994. The producers wanted the character to have an exciting storyline, so they decided to kill her off. Mullins said "It was time for me to move on and I'd never have escaped the image of grumpy old Julie unless she actually died." During a murder mystery weekend, which was attended by many Erinsborough residents, Julie's body was found at the bottom of a staircase. Mullins explained that originally Julie was going to commit suicide, but the writers changed the storyline a couple of days before filming without telling her. Mullins told Inside Soap's Victoria Ross that this meant in the lead up to Julie's death, she played her "like a desperate woman on the verge of suicide!" Philip was initially suspected of killing his wife after the other guests witnessed him having an argument with Julie before she died.

During Mullin's time on the show, she enjoyed her arguments with Cheryl Stark and felt very close to her on-screen family. She hated the racist storylines involving the Lim's eating her dog, a storyline she fought hard against filming.

Mullins was set to return for the spin-off series Neighbours vs Zombies, however, scheduling conflicts denied her of the opportunity. A few years later she managed to return for Neighbours vs Time Travel, a project she thoroughly enjoyed.

== Storylines ==
Julie, known for her nosy and gossipy tendencies, indirectly derails her friend Lorraine Kingham's (Antoinette Byron) engagement to her ex-boyfriend Des Clarke (Paul Keane) by talking Lorraine into calling off the wedding on the eve of the ceremony. While working at the Pacific bank one day, Julie is held up by Gordon Miller (Red Symons) who threatens to shoot her unless she complies with the robbery. She later has to describe Miller to the police when they begin the hunt for him. Following the bank ordeal, Julie clashes with Anna Rossi (Roslyn Gentle) over dating her father, Jim.

When Philip Martin becomes manager at the bank, Julie falls for him and they begin an affair but Julie's family are against the relationship as Philip is married with two children. Philip is prepared to leave his alcoholic wife, Loretta for Julie but when Philip's daughter Debbie attempts to commit suicide due to her parents constantly fighting, Julie steps back and tells Philip to return to his family. Julie later learns that Philip and Loretta have been involved in a car crash, which kills Loretta. Julie then agrees to help Philip look after his children Debbie and Michael and they leave Erinsborough together as a family. Julie and Philip later marry and have a daughter, Hannah.

Seven years later, The Martins return to Erinsborough for Todd Landers' (Kristian Schmid) funeral. Julie resumes her gossipy ways and is less than pleased when Philip takes on the janitorial job at Erinsborough High, after having lost his job at the bank. However, things look better when Julie's brother Paul offers Philip the position of manager of the Lassiter's complex and they move across the street to Number 32. Michael returns home from boarding school, and begins a plot to kill Julie and begins playing mind games with her. Michael is arrested on one occasion after being suspected of arson and blames Julie for calling the police, however, Hannah comes forward admitting she did so. A rift develops between Philip and Julie after she refuses to let Michael back into the house. Michael is eventually charged with arson and sent to a youth detention centre for a period of time.

Jim dies of a heart attack and when Julie learns she will not inherit a share of the house like Helen or her siblings but Jim's share in Lou Carpenter's car yard, she is puzzled and hurt further when she learns Jim is not her real father but in fact that Jim's boss Roger Bannon is and she is the product of a rape. She meets her half-brother, Roger Jr (Guy Fearon) but does not disclose her identity and when he tries to rape her she flees. On her return, Julie pushes Philip away and he decides to move to Perth with Debbie but they eventually reconcile during Helen's birthday. Julie then finds herself at odds with the Lim family who are renting Paul's house and forbids Hannah from playing with their youngest child, Tommy (David Tong). She causes further outrage when she accuses the Lims of cooking and eating Hannah's dog, Holly. Philip makes Julie apologise to the family and they settle their differences before the Lim family move to nearby Eden Hills. Julie decides to return to school to get her HSC, but drops out after cheating on a test.

Michael receives parole and Julie goes out of her way to make him feel welcome by customising his bedroom, but is hurt when Philip and Debbie accuse her of isolating Michael from the rest of the family. Philip then realises Julie's intentions are genuine and apologises to her. The pair invest some of their money in a newsagents which allows them to work together. The relative peace and tranquillity lasts for the couple until Julie's neuroses begins to surface again and she becomes unhappy when Philip pursues his own interests without consulting her. The fighting between them takes its toll on the rest of the family; exasperated with her granddaughter's increasingly self-destructive tendencies, Helen issues Julie with an ultimatum – either seek psychiatric help or move out of the family home. When a group from Ramsay Street (including Cheryl, Lou, Sam, Marlene, Ren and Cody) go away for a murder mystery weekend, Helen urges Julie to make up with Philip and she decides at the last minute to join him at the hotel. However, on her arrival they begin arguing. The following morning, Cheryl Stark (Caroline Gillmer) discovers Julie's body on the lawn after falling from a tower the night before. Julie is rushed to hospital but later dies, leaving Philip widowed once again. At Julie's cremation, Philip is arrested and questioned under caution as the chief suspect but when Debbie has flashbacks to the night of Julie's death she reveals that Julie had been drinking heavily and fell to her death. Philip is then cleared of murder and the family begin to move on with their lives.

== Reception ==
Television critic for The Age Marie McNamara picked out Blanche and David Clencie (Danny Ramsay) for their acting performances, and branded Julie a "bossy boots". Fellow Age critic, Barbara Hooks also praised the character and Blanche's portrayal, writing "Yet, Vikki Blanche, who plays Julie Robinson, a prissy, bossy bank teller, promises to make a meal of her role, one of the best in the show." A reporter for the Aberdeen Press and Journal said Blanche had "succeeded in making Julie one of the most popular characters in the Australian soap."

In his book, Super Aussie Soaps, Andrew Mercado was critical of Julie upon her return with a husband stating: "She was no less annoying when she had been single". He also noted Julie's change in character as her last year in the serial progressed, stating she became unhinged. Joking about her death scenes he also stated "Given her incessant whining, it was almost a relief to viewers". Anthony Cowdy of British newspaper The Independent said "Julie Martin, is such an accomplished blamer that she would be beaten up daily if she were a schoolgirl."

Kat Brown of The Daily Telegraph was not a fan of Julie, saying she was "one of the most appalling characters ever to appear on the programme". During a feature on the show, Joanna Murray-Smith from The Age commented "Frankly, I think Julie's really pushing it with Philip and if she doesn't learn to give a little, and to really listen, she's going to wind up in a pokey flat with a budgie for the rest of her life." In 1994, Julie was seen dressing up in a school uniform to seduce Philip, who had become impotent. The scene was criticised by the Broadcasting Standards Council for being "too kinky" for younger viewers to watch.

Lisa Anthony from BIG! magazine said that Julie accusing the Lim family of eating her dog Holly was "one of the most bizarre storylines ever". A writer for the BBC's Neighbours website said Julie's most notable moment was "Falling from a roof and dying during a murder mystery weekend." In 1995, Kate Langbroek of The Age said there had not been a "resident bitch" on the show following Julie's death. Julie was placed at number twenty-four on the Huffpost's "35 greatest Neighbours characters of all time" feature. Journalist Adam Beresford described her as "so obnoxious and unbearable that we felt sorry for her terminally dull husband Philip." He added she spent two years "getting on everyone's nerves" to the point that after her death she was not missed by anyone. A Herald Sun reporter included Julie's death in their "Neighbours' 30 most memorable moments" feature.

In a Time Out feature profiling "best soap opera moments", British playwright Robin French chose Michael terrorising Julie as the most memorable. He recalled it was her "favourite storyline" and Michael taunted Julie with "frightening poise and unflinching nerve". He added that despite Julie appearing insane, he was clever to target "a character the audience really hated – so we were perversely egging him on."
