= Philip Martin (Neighbours) =

- Neighbours character
- Ian Rawlings as Philip Martin (1995)
- Portrayed by: Christopher Milne (1985); Ian Rawlings (1992–2023)
- Duration: 1985, 1992–1999, 2005, 2022–2023
- First appearance: 21 June 1985
- Last appearance: 13 November 2023
- Introduced by: Reg Watson (1985); Don Battye (1992); Ric Pellizerri (2005); Jason Herbison (2022)
- Spin-off appearances: Neighbours vs Time Travel (2017)
- Christopher Milne as Philip Martin (1985)
In-universe information
- Other names: Philippa Martinez (pen name)
- Occupation: Pacific Bank manager; School janitor; Lassiter's Hotel manager; Newsagent; Barman; Novelist; Carpenter's Mechanics owner
- Wife: Loretta Martin (until 1985); Julie Robinson (1986–1994); Ruth Wilkinson (1998–present)
- Sons: Michael Martin
- Daughters: Debbie Martin; Hannah Martin
- Stepsons: Ben Atkins; Lance Wilkinson
- Stepdaughters: Anne Wilkinson

Philip Gordon Martin is a fictional character from the Australian soap opera Neighbours, played by Ian Rawlings. Originally played by Christopher Milne during the character's first appearance in 1985, Rawlings took over the role when the character returned to the show in 1992 and remained until 1999. He briefly returned in 2005 for several episodes, and later in 2017 for the web series Neighbours vs Time Travel, and in 2022 for the show's then finale. Rawlings reprised the role in 2023.

== Casting ==
In the 27 June 1992 issue of TV Week, David Brown reported that Ian Rawlings, known for his role as Wayne Hamilton in Sons and Daughters, had joined the cast of Neighbours as Philip, the husband of original character Julie Robinson.

In September 1999, Jason Herbison of Inside Soap reported that the Martin family had been written out of Neighbours and that they had already filmed their final scenes. On 14 April 2005, Kris Green of Digital Spy announced Rawlings would be reprising his role of Philip and joining many ex-cast members in returning to Neighbours for special episodes celebrating the show's 20th anniversary.

In 2017, Rawlings reprised his role for an appearance in the five-part web series Neighbours vs Time Travel.

== Development ==
In 1995, Philip is introduced to Jen Handley (Alyce Platt) and he becomes aware that she likes him. Jen faces an uphill struggle to get Philip to go out with her because he cannot believe that a beautiful and younger woman is interested in him. Philip thinks Jen simply feels sorry for him because he is a widower and single father. To show her he does not need sympathy, Philip decides to "play the field" and embarks on a series of random dates. Eventually Jen persuades Philip to go out with her and they begin a "passionate" relationship. Philip provides some much needed stability in Jen's life and is different from the other guys that she has been out with before. Jen and Philip's relationship later breaks down and Jen leaves Erinsborough.

Philip meets Ruth Wilkinson (Ailsa Piper) the following year when she comes to care for Helen Daniels (Anne Haddy). Initially Philip and Ruth do not get on well, but when Ruth's ex-husband Bill Hails (Ian Stanley) appears, Philip becomes a "useful ally." Philip becomes nervous about asking Ruth out and he is "egged on" by Helen who plays matchmaker. The Daily Record said "the makers of Neighbours can stretch out this relationship for several episodes before we have a clear idea if it's actually going anywhere." Philip and Ruth share a kiss and they begin a relationship. Ruth and Philip later get engaged and they marry, while Ruth waits for results of tests for breast cancer. Philip's son, Michael (Troy Beckwith), returns for the wedding and Ruth arrives at the ceremony on the back of a Harley Davidson motorbike. Piper said that there is an atmosphere of madness, happiness and excitement to the day. After Philip has a mid-life crisis, he decides to move the family to Darwin. Ruth initially considers commuting thousands of miles, but ultimately chooses to follow her husband when she gets a top job at a Darwin hospital.

Seventeen years later, Rawlings reprised his role for the show's then finale. Of his short return at the end of the finale episode, Rawlings said, "it's pretty surreal. I have to say the place hasn't changed that much. It's all pretty much the same. It's all kind of as it was in Erinsborough back then." Rawlings returned again in 2023, following the show's return.

== Storylines ==
Philip is first seen when Julie Robinson (Vikki Blanche) bumps into him when she is in a hurry to get to work on time to meet with the new bank manager. It turns out that Philip is the new bank manager. They later become involved, but are met with a problem, Philip is married to Loretta (Lyn Semmler) and they have two children, Michael and Debbie. Loretta is a violent alcoholic, which puts a strain on the marriage. Philip decides he cannot take any more and decides to leave Loretta, but has a change of heart when Debbie tries to kill herself by overdosing on tablets. Julie tells Philip to stay with his family, but several months later, Philip and Loretta are involved in a car crash caused by Loretta's behavior. Loretta is killed in the crash. Philip and Julie reunite, and she chooses to move into his home to help care for the children. Off screen, Philip and Julie marry and have a daughter, Hannah (Rebecca Ritters). Although Debbie gets on well with Julie, Michael comes to blame her for Loretta's death.

The Martins return to Erinsborough seven years later for the funeral of Todd Landers (Kristian Schmid). They get lost on the back roads, and while circling the area they soon find Helen, who had been kidnapped by Todd's father Bob (Bruce Kilpatrick). The family intend to stay only for several weeks but settle into the area. Things are financially tight for the family. Philip takes a job Janitor at Erinsborough High, much to the embarrassment of Julie (now Julie Mullins). However, their fortunes change when Julie's brother Paul (Stefan Dennis) offers Philip a managerial position at Lassiters. They soon move across the street to Number 32, which they rent from Helen. When Michael returns from boarding school, he causes Philip and Julie a number of problems, including spiking Hannah's orange juice with vodka and poisoning Julie. Michael is arrested and placed in a detention centre. Philip, despite all this, is not prepared to write off his only son. Michael is released from the detention centre and changes his attitude and makes amends with Julie and Hannah. Philip and Julie's relationship begins to deteriorate again after the death of her father and her discovery that she was the product of rape. Julie finds maintaining a loving relationship with Philip difficult and, although they later reconcile at Helen's birthday party, the marriage never fully recovers.

Philip and Julie's marriage continues to go from bad to worse, but they decide to go away on a Murder Mystery weekend with several neighbours. Things are still tense. The next day, neighbour Cheryl Stark (Caroline Gillmer) discovers Julie's body at the foot of the stairs. Julie lies comatose in hospital for several days and Philip keeps a bedside vigil. Julie dies and Philip is grief-stricken. He is subsequently arrested at Julie's cremation and charged with her murder. Debbie eventually reveals that she saw Julie fall from the top balcony of the hotel whilst drunk the night before her body was discovered. Philip is then exonerated and falls into a depression and begins drinking. After being arrested for drink-driving and learning that Hannah had an accident while he was drunk, Philip begins to pull himself together.

With Julie dead and Michael and Debbie gone, Philip relies on help from Helen to bring up Hannah. Philip begins a relationship with Jen Handley, which Hannah is ecstatic about. However, the relationship later ends. Shortly after Helen suffers a stroke and is hospitalised, Philip meets Ruth Wilkinson, the mother of Hannah's ex-boyfriend, Lance (Andrew Bibby) and they clash over Helen's care. Philip and Ruth kiss on Christmas Day 1996, which is witnessed by Lance who handles it badly. Eventually, all their respective children accept the couple. Philip and Ruth's relationship goes through several tests including Helen's death, Philip's proposal seconds before Ruth's other son, Ben Atkins (Brett Cousins) is injured in a racing car accident and Ruth's breast cancer scare. The couple marry, but Hannah finds it hard to adjust and she goes to stay in Paris for six months.

Philip gets a new job in Darwin, he and Ruth are keen to pack up and move, but Hannah is reluctant at first as she feels she will be leaving behind memories of various friends and family who have died in the years previous, but she eventually agrees to leave and the Martins bid farewell to Erinsborough. The family settle in Darwin near the Willis family.

Six years later, Philip and Doug Willis (Terence Donovan) return to Erinsborough to pay their friend Lou Carpenter (Tom Oliver) a visit and to watch the screening of Annalise Hartman's (Kimberly Davies) documentary about Ramsay Street. At the Scarlet bar while conversing with former neighbour, Susan Kennedy (Jackie Woodburne), Philip bumps into his former brother-in-law, Paul, and immediately launches a verbal tirade at him for framing him for fraud twelve years earlier. Doug and Paul's sister, Lucy (Melissa Bell) quickly break up the fight. Despite this, Philip enjoys catching up with old friends, then returns home to Ruth in Darwin after watching the documentary. Seventeen years later, Philip returns for Toadfish Rebecchi (Ryan Moloney) and Melanie Pearson's (Lucinda Cowden) wedding. The following day, a slightly hungover Philip helps Lance and Amy Greenwood (Jacinta Stapleton) explain to Toadie and the other residents how he and Ruth encouraged Lance and Amy in their plan to have a baby shortly after they got back together, before Philip later departs to return home to Ruth in Darwin.

== Reception ==
For his portrayal of Philip, Rawlings was nominated for "Best Supporting Actor" at the 1997 Inside Soap Awards. The BBC said Philip's most notable moment was "Coping with Julie's death after she fell off a roof." In 2010, to celebrate Neighbours' 25th anniversary Sky, a British satellite broadcasting company, profiled twenty-five characters of which they believed were the most memorable in the series history. Philip is in the list and describing him they state: "Nice? Yes. Down on his luck? Of course. Cuddly Phil was an upbeat family man, but unfortunately that family included his manipulative son Michael (when he wasn't in 'juvvie', of course), shrieking harpy of a wife Julie, and not-at-all-needy Debbie and Hannah. Life got better for everyone after Julie died, even when he had to contend with new wife Ruth. With his ability to smile through whatever scrunchie-based arguments his daughters seemed to get into on a daily basis, Phil embodied the gloriously happy-go-lucky period of Neighbours in the mid-nineties."

In July 1995, a What's on TV critic was sympathetic towards Philip's troubles. They assessed that Debbie required therapy, Michael left for the outback and Julie died suspiciously. They opined that following these events, "few could blame" Philip "for going off the rails", which he did in "spectacular fashion". They concluded that "super gran Helen Daniels" would be his likely saviour. Adam Beresford from HuffPost branded the character Julie's "terminally dull husband". After his brief 2022 return, Stephen Patterson from Metro dubbed Philip a "Neighbours legend" and called his return a "blink-and-you’ll-miss-it moment".
