= Danny Ramsay =

Fictional character from the soap opera Neighbours

- Neighbours character
- Portrayed by: David Clencie
- Duration: 1985–1986, 2005
- First appearance: 18 March 1985
- Last appearance: 27 July 2005
- Created by: Reg Watson
- Introduced by: Reg Watson (1985); Ric Pellizzeri (2005)
In-universe information
- Occupation: Student; Bank teller
- Family: Ramsay
- Father: Tim Duncan
- Mother: Maria Ramsay
- Adoptive father: Max Ramsay
- Half-brothers: Shane Ramsay
- Uncles: Tom Ramsay
- Aunts: Anna Rossi; Madge Bishop
- First cousins: Charlene Robinson

Danny Ramsay is a fictional character from the Australian television soap opera Neighbours, played by David Clencie. He made his first appearance during the serial's debut episode broadcast on 18 March 1985. Danny was the first character to speak in the show. Danny's storylines focused on his troubled relationship with his father Max and his subsequent discovery that Tim Duncan is his real father, his friendship with Scott Robinson and his job as a bank teller. Danny moved away from Ramsay Street on 31 July 1986. In 2005, Clencie reprised his role as Danny for a cameo in Annalise Hartman's documentary on Ramsay Street.

== Casting ==
Danny is one of the twelve original characters conceived by the creator and then executive producer of Neighbours, Reg Watson. Actor David Clencie was 20 years old when he was cast as teenage, high school student Danny. He was initially signed for six months, with a six month option. Clencie commented: "Beyond that I haven't made any plans. I never do until I'm unemployed." Clencie was hesitant about joining the cast of another long-running series, following stints as a regular cast member on four other shows. He said he had other options at the time, including a Chekhov play that he had to give up. Jason Donovan, who would later go on to play Scott Robinson, auditioned for the role in 1984 when Neighbours was in its planning stages. Donovan was offered the role first but told he should leave school. He informed his father Terence Donovan who preferred his son to concentrate on his studies and Donovan declined the role.

Clencie starred in the first scene of the first episode and became the first person to speak on Neighbours. Clencie enjoyed the early days of the show and said "We'd have a good laugh, something that's probably missing a bit from a lot of television these days. And the directors went with it, they said 'this is great, let's do it'". Neighbours was cancelled after 170 episodes and Clencie said the cast were "gobsmacked". A few weeks later, he received a call from his agent who told him that Neighbours was starting again after Network Ten picked it up and they wanted him to be in it. They offered him a year's contract and Clencie accepted. He said "I was just elated, and most of the cast were, because we had really felt robbed at the time".

== Development ==
Of his character, Clencie told Patrice Fidgeon of TV Week that Danny was "an interesting character to play, a bit different from all the others." He said Danny had many sides to him and described him as "brash and wild on the outside, but underneath, quite troubled and confused." Clencie also claimed that Danny was an extension of his own persona describing him as: "young, wild, crazy yet vulnerable and a nice kid." Clencie's hair was dyed red for the role.

Being the "gentler" of the two brothers, Danny could not take Max's bullying ways, unlike his brother Shane. The constant tension between Danny and Max and Danny seemingly having a better relationship with his mother then Shane, led Andrew Mercado to question whether Danny was struggling to come to terms with his sexuality in his 2004 book Super Aussie soaps. Danny would spend more time with his mother where he could be more "theatrical", Mercado also described Danny as being "girlie" and pondered whether this made Max believe that Danny was not a true Ramsay. Max believed Danny was a "wimp" and wished he would be more like Shane. When Danny found out about his real parentage, he went through an identity crisis as he felt unloved. The news split the family in half, with Danny leaving for Brisbane with his mother.

Clencie and his character were written out of the show after just over a year. The departure was by mutual agreement between Clencie and the producers. Clencie said "I was offered three different contracts with the show, but after discussion it was decided I would take a break". Clencie later said he left without regret because he felt that Danny had nowhere left to go as a character.

In July 2005, Clencie joined several former cast members in reprising their roles for an appearance in the show's 20th anniversary episode, which focuses on a fictional documentary about Ramsay Street and its residents. Clencie was surprised that people remembered him and found that he was "welcomed with open arms" when he filmed his cameo. He also explained that Danny is now "building pools in Brisbane, so that's a better life than he had in Ramsay Street!" In 2020, Clencie reflected on his 20th anniversary appearance and believed Danny would actually be "a successful businessman" instead of a pool builder, an occupation he believed was not true to the character. He thought Danny could have been helping out a friend when his appearance was filmed. He also explained that a career in business could be useful if his character was to return to the show, as the writers could set up "a rivalry" with Paul Robinson. Clencie added that if he were to return to Neighbours, it would only feel right if Danny's brother Shane came with him.

== Storylines ==
Danny is the youngest son of Maria Ramsay (Dasha Blahova), he was born after a one-night stand between herself and Tim Duncan (Nick Carrafa). Maria let her husband Max (Francis Bell) believe Danny was his son. Max and Danny had a difficult relationship, with Max often comparing Danny to his older brother, Shane (Peter O'Brien).

Danny begins having strange dreams in which he sees Shane being killed during his swimming training. Maria suggests that he visit the family physician, Dr. Lawson to work out what is causing these nightmares. Following a car crash with Bank robber Gordon Miller (Red Symons) which leaves him and Shane injured, Danny believes that the dreams were a warning. Danny and his best friend, Scott Robinson (Darius Perkins) are wrongly accused of mugging Carol Brown (Merrin Canning), when they discover her in a drunken haze after the real muggers had fled. Scott and Danny then run away from home. and end up staying with Mrs. Forbes (Gwen Plumb) on her farm after their possessions are stolen. They boys help Mrs Forbes part-time, before returning home. Both Danny and Scott fall for Maria's sister's friend, Wendy Gibson (Kylie Foster), who plays them off against each other but gets a taste of her own medicine when a man named Tim (Mark Neal) stands her up.

Max and Maria's marriage collapses after the revelation that Max is not Danny's father, but Tim Duncan who Maria had a one-night stand with. Danny is initially unaware of the revelation. When Maria prepares to leave for Hong Kong with new partner Richard Morrison (Peter Flett), Danny refuses to go with them and remains in Erinsborough. Danny then leaves school to become a junior teller at the Pacific Bank. Danny overhears a conversation between Max and his French teacher, Kate Drew, and learns that Max is not his father. Danny and Max then work things out with Max assuring that he loves him as his own son. Danny falls for Marcie (Erif Perkins), a fellow employee and tries to impress her and works for Clive Gibbons (Geoff Paine) as a gorilla-gram. This proves to be in vain as Marcie rejects Danny. Danny's job causes further problems when it raises the ire of Max who dislikes Clive and when Danny is mistaken for a bank robber and arrested. The misunderstanding is eventually cleared up and Danny is freed. After learning Max and Maria have reunited in Queensland, Danny, deciding he has nothing left in Ramsay Street decides to get a transfer to a branch of the bank up north and leaves. Nearly twenty years later, he appears in Annalise Hartman's documentary about Ramsay Street.

== Reception ==
While reviewing the series early episodes, Jacqueline Lee Lewes of The Sydney Morning Herald said the younger cast members who "deserve a mention" were Clencie, Smith, Dennis, Perkins and O'Brien, adding that they are "obviously going to be worth keeping an eye on." Debra Jopson from the same newspaper branded Danny "the soppy son who can't impress macho Dad, no matter how hard he tries".

Ruth Deller of television website Lowculture gave Danny a 2 out of 5 for his contribution to Neighbours, during a feature called "A guide to recognising your Ramsays and Robinsons". She said "Danny was one of the original cast of Neighbours, although he didn't stay in the show for very long. He had an ongoing rivalry with brother Shane, and was good mates with Scott Robinson, but his only real storylines of note were the revelations over his paternity, and a stint working for Dr Clive Gibbons as a gorilla-o-gram".

In her book "Soap opera", Dorothy Hobson describes Danny and his family as "more working class than other characters", also stating: "They had working-class jobs but were not represented as cloth cap wearing or dowdy, they were bright and modern and representative of a vibrant and working population."
