= Louise Le Nay =

Australian actress and writer

- Born: 1957; Australia
- Education: Melbourne University
- Years active: 1981–2006
- Notable work: Prisoner – as Sandy Edwards; Neighbours – as Barbara Hill

Louise Le Nay (born 1957) is an Australian actress and writer, known for her role as Sandy Edwards in Prisoner (1981–82), and Stella Stinson, Kim's adoptive mother in Lift Off (1992–95). Her first novel, The Hero, was published in 1996, her second, Edenhope, in 2024.

== Career ==
Le Nay played Sandy Edwards in Prisoner, in a role which spanned the end of 1981 and the beginning of 1982 on screen. In the show, Sandy became Top Dog whilst Bea Smith was in hospital, and was a popular and key character. Whilst working on the series, she discovered that she was pregnant and eventually left to have her daughter, Victoria. She later acted with her daughter when she had a guest role in A Country Practice in 1983, playing a single mother.

At the end of 1985 Le Nay was appearing as Barbara Hill in the original run of Neighbours, when it was still screened by Australia's Seven Network. Although not a main character, she played a key role in the run up to what was intended to be the show's final episode (episode 171) as the new girlfriend of respectable villain Charles Durham who planned to kill the first wife of Paul Robinson, Terry.

Le Nay's first novel, The Hero was published in 1996 by Allen & Unwin. She later moved into writing for television, writing scripts as well as progressing from a story liner to script editor for the popular series Neighbours during the time the show achieved its peak rating performance success when character Karl Kennedy was cheating on his wife with his receptionist. She also worked as a script editor on Blue Heelers and MDA.

Her second novel, Edenhope, was published by Text Publishing in 2024.

== Filmography ==
Acting credits
Year	Title	Role	Notes
1981	Kingswood Country	Mandy	Season 3 (guest role – 1 episode)
1981	Lay Me Down in Lilac Fields	Unknown/unnamed role	Television film
1981–82	Prisoner	Sandy Edwards	Seasons 3–4 (supporting role — 30 episodes)
1982	Freedom	Margie	Feature film
1983	A Country Practice	Elly Marsh	Season 3 (guest role – 2 episodes)
1985	Emoh Ruo	Helen Tunkley	Feature film
1985	Neighbours	Barbara Hill	Season 1 (recurring role – 17 episodes)
1986	Jenny Kissed Me	Welfare Officer	Feature film
1986	The More Things Change...	Lydia	Feature film
1989	Celia	Debbie Burke	Feature film
1992	Lift Off	Unknown/unnamed role	Season 1 (guest role – 1 episode)
Non-acting credits
Year	Title	Credit	Episodes
1985	Neighbours	Script editor	Unknown episode(s)
1996–2003	Neighbours	Writer	40 episodes
2003–05	MDA	Script editor	13 episodes
2003	MDA	Writer	1 episode
2003	The Sleepover Club	Writer	1 episode
2006	Headland	Writer	1 episode
