= Maxine Klibingaitis =

Australian actress (1964–2023)

- Born: Maxine Koran Klibingaitis; 17 May 1964; Ballarat, Victoria, Australia
- Died: 17 April 2023 (aged 58); Melbourne, Australia
- Occupation: Actress
- Years active: 1982–2023
- Notable work: Prisoner (1983–1985); Neighbours (1985)
- Spouse: Andrew Friedman (m. 1987)
- Children: 1

Maxine Koran Klibingaitis (17 May 1964 – 17 April 2023) was an Australian actress, notable for her roles in TV soap operas and serials. She is best known for her roles in Prisoner, as Bobbie Mitchell, and in Neighbours, as Terry Inglis.

== Personal life ==
Klibingaitis was born in Ballarat, Victoria, Australia on 17 May 1964. In 1987, Klibingaitis married Australian director Andrew Friedman. They have one son, Zane Friedman.

== Career ==
Klibingaitis is most notable for her role in the cult drama soap opera, Prisoner (known internationally as Prisoner: Cell Block H), from 1983 to 1985, as rebellious teen punk, Bobbie Mitchell. During her stint on the series, Klibingaitis' character was involved in several dramatic story arcs, including shoplifting, escaping custody, kidnapping, prostitution, miscarriage and a suicide attempt, before being eventually paroled and becoming engaged to be married. She returned in a guest appearance for a wedding storyline. Klibingaitis attended a 40th anniversary reunion event for Prisoner in February 2019 and a special event hosted by Ken Mulholland and Matt Batten of the website Talking Prisoner, in August 2022.

She was cast in the regular role of Terry Inglis on Melbourne-based soap opera, Neighbours during 1985, in which the character, an apprentice plumber, married Paul Robinson (Stefan Dennis), before committing murder, then attempting to kill Paul by shooting him, leading to her incarceration and demise by committing suicide. Terry's death, which happened off-screen, attracted controversy, as the subject of suicide was not a common topic covered in an early evening program, and was the only character on the show to die in this way.

In 1990, Klibingaitis appeared as Gloria Stubbs in the short-lived soap opera Family and Friends. Her only other leading role in a television series was that of Sophie Verstak in the short-lived comedy, Hampton Court in 1991, a spin-off from the popular sitcom, Hey Dad..!. Her additional TV credits include, Special Squad, Fields of Fire, The Flying Doctor, Home and Away, Blue Heelers and Round the Twist.

She made her film debut in 1989, appearing in James Ricketson's Candy Regentag, before going onto roles as a regular in Timothy Spanos films and short form series including Prisoner Queen: Mindless Music & Mirrorballs, Mondo Maniacs, which earned her a MUFF Award for Best Supporting Female Actor at the Melbourne Underground Film Festival, Boronia Boys and the spin off, Boronia Backpackers.

In May 2022, Klibingaitis appeared in an episode of the podcast Yarn About You.

== Death ==
Klibingaitis died suddenly and unexpectedly in Melbourne, Australia on 17 April 2023 at the age of 58. No cause was specified.

== Filmography ==
=== Television ===
Year	Title	Role	Notes
1983	Home	Sharon	Season 1, episodes 29-32
1983–1985	Prisoner	Bobbie Mitchell	Seasons 5–7, 108 episodes
1984	Special Squad	Chico	Season 1, episode 37
1985	Neighbours	Terry Inglis (Robinson)	Season 1, 69 episodes
1987	Fields of Fire	Joan	Miniseries, 2 episodes
1988	The Flying Doctors	Kylie	Season 4, episode 1
1988	Home and Away	Denise	Season 1, episode 181
1990	Family and Friends	Gloria Stubbs	
1991	Hampton Court	Sophie Verstak	Season 1, 13 episodes
1991	Col'n Carpenter	Gold Digger	Season 4, episode 7
1992	All Together Now	Veronica	Season 3, episode 9
1995	Blue Heelers	Judy	Season 2, episode 8
2001	Round the Twist	Tiffany	Season 4, episode 7
2002	Marshall Law	Val	Season 1, episode 10
2003	MDA	Linda Klein	Season 2, episode 13
2022	Boronia Backpackers	Caz McKenzie	Season 1, 4 episodes
2023	Celebrity House Cleaner	Wanda	Season 1, 2 episodes
2023	Five Bedrooms	Beverly	Season 4, episode 1
2023	Mondo Maniacs	Mondo	Season 1, 3 episodes (also editor)

=== Film ===
Year	Title	Role	Notes
1989	Candy Regentag	Bibi	Feature film
2003	Prisoner Queen: Mindless Music & Mirrorballs	Cecilia	Feature Film
2007	Moonlight & Magic	Frank	Feature film
2007	Miss Mouskouri	Pauline Wilson	Short film
2011	Boronia Boys	Caz	Feature Film
2013	The House Cleaner	Wanda	Feature film
