= James Oram (journalist) =

- Born: James William Oram; 18 May 1936; New Zealand
- Died: 19 December 1996 (aged 60); Surry Hills, New South Wales, Australia
- Other name: Jim Oram
- Occupations: Journalist, writer
- Years active: 1960–1996
- Notable work: The People's Pope; Neighbours: Behind the Scenes
- Spouse: Marie Ussher

James William Oram (1936–1996) was a New Zealand-born, Sydney-based journalist and writer, whose career spanned 40 years. After stints as a cadet and police reporter in his teenage years, Oram moved to England and began working on Today magazine, where he befriended English rock band The Beatles. Upon returning to Australia, he worked at Everybody's magazine, The Daily Mirror and Sunday Telegraph. His first book about the history of pop music The Business of Pop was published in 1966. In 1979, Oram wrote a biography titled The People's Pope about John Paul II, which went on to sell six million copies worldwide. He also wrote biographies of Australian actors Paul Hogan and Mel Gibson. Oram also wrote behind the scenes books about popular Australian soap operas Neighbours, Home and Away and The Flying Doctors. His Neighbours: Behind the Scenes book was serialised in a national newspaper and became a best-seller in Britain. Oram retired from News Limited in 1990, but continued writing features for The Sun-Herald. His final book The Last Showman: Larry Dulhunty's Larrikin Life was published in 1992. Oram was diagnosed with cancer in May 1996 and he died in December that same year.

== Early life ==
Oram was born in New Zealand. He grew up in Invercargill, where he was the youngest child of a Plymouth Brethren church elder. During his school years, Oram joined a travelling carnival, but he returned home after being sacked due to a fire. He quit school and began riding motorbikes on the wall of death. He joined The Southland Times as a cadet reporter when he was 15 years old.

== Career ==
Oram moved to Melbourne, Australia in the 1950s and secured a job as a police reporter at The Sun. In 1960, he moved to England and worked on Today magazine, which gave him his "big break" when he began writing about English rock band The Beatles. He became friends with the group and flew to Sydney with them as they began their tour of Australia. Oram soon began working for the Australian tabloid-style magazine Everybody's. He became "Australia's top entertainment writer". His book The Business of Pop was published in 1966 and looks at the history of pop music. He also wrote The Hellraisers with Jim Fagan in 1967. He began writing for The Daily Mirror in the late 1960s, as well as the Sunday Telegraph.

Oram became "a royal tour specialist" whenever the British Royal family visited Oceania. He was also the first journalist to report from the scene of the 1978 Hilton hotel bombing, having heard the explosion while on his way home. In 1979, Oram wrote biography The People's Pope, which tells the life story of the first Polish pope John Paul II. Oram had just returned from overseas when he was asked to go to Poland and write about the new Pope, whom he was not aware had been elected. He wrote The People's Pope in six weeks. It sold six million copies worldwide. He followed this with Hogan: The Story of a Son of Oz, a biography of Australian actor Paul Hogan, who became internationally recognised for Crocodile Dundee. The book was an Age best-seller, debuting on the non-fiction chart at Number 6.

In 1988, Oram wrote Neighbours: Behind the Scenes, which delves into how the popular Australian soap was made, the private lives of its stars, and how it found success in the UK. The book was serialised in British tabloid The Sun, and became a best-seller in Britain, selling over 350,000 copies. In September 1988, it reached Number 1 in the General Books list compiled by WHSmith. Publisher Angus & Robertson hoped to replicate that success with the publication of Oram's Home and Away: Behind the Scenes the following year. It too was serialised in The Sun, as well as Today and leading women's magazines.

Oram retired from News Limited in 1990, but went onto write feature pieces for The Sun-Herald. He was the only reporter to get an interview with serial killer Ivan Milat in jail. His journalism career lasted for a total of forty years. In 1991, Oram wrote The Flying Doctors: The Inside Story, a companion book to the Australian drama series The Flying Doctors. The book looks at the real Royal Flying Doctor Service, goes behind the scenes of the television series, and reveals the private lives of the actors involved. That same year, Oram also released a biography of actor Mel Gibson titled Reluctant Star: Mel Gibson Story, which was also serialised in The Sun in the UK. In 1992, Oram's final book, The Last Showman: Larry Dulhunty's Larrikin Life, a biography about Australia's last great travelling entertainer Larry Dulhunty was released.

== Personal life ==
Oram was diagnosed with cancer in May 1996. He married his partner of over 20 years, Marie Ussher at their home in Surry Hills in September.

Oram died on 19 December 1996, aged 60. He died at his Surry Hills home with his wife by his side, and other family and friends present. He was survived by his wife and sister. The funeral was held at the Eastern Suburbs Crematorium on 23 December 1996.

Editor-in-chief of The Daily Telegraph John Hartigan paid tribute to Oram, calling him "totally professional, wicked, gentle and totally erudite". Hartigan continued: "He was passionate about Sydney and its people, from the down and outer in a back lane to the silvertail with the harbour view. Everyone intrigued him. Sydney will miss a truly great journalist and a great bloke." The James Oram Award for Excellence in Journalism was set up in his honour.

== Bibliography ==
- The Business of Pop (1966)
- The Hellraisers (with Jim Fagan; 1967)
- The People's Pope (1979)
- Hogan: The Story of a Son of Oz (1987)
- Neighbours: Behind the Scenes (1988)
- Home and Away: Behind the Scenes (1989)
- The Flying Doctors: The Inside Story (1991)
- Reluctant Star: Mel Gibson Story (1991)
- The Last Showman: Larry Dulhunty's Larrikin Life (1992)
