= Francis Bell (actor) =

Actor

- Bell as Max Ramsay in Neighbours
- Born: Wayne Francis Earl Bell; 18 April 1944; Cambridge, United Kingdom
- Died: 3 May 1994 (aged 50); Auckland, New Zealand
- Occupation: Actor
- Years active: 1976–1994

Wayne Francis Earl Bell (18 April 1944 – 3 May 1994) was a New Zealand actor who achieved international stardom playing the part of original character Max Ramsay in the early years of the popular Australian soap opera, Neighbours. During his career he also acted in Australian serials The Sullivans and Sons and Daughters. He appeared in 15 films from 1976 until his death.

== Career ==
Bell had a BA in philosophy and English at the University of Auckland, and an MA in drama from Leeds University. He was a member of the National Theatre. He began his career with major roles in British theatre productions, including King Lear, Much Ado About Nothing, and Hamlet. Bell had minor roles in The Sullivans, Cop Shop, Carson's Law, Special Squad, and Sons and Daughters. In 1985, Bell played the role of Major-General Howard "Pompey" Elliott in the critically acclaimed Australian mini-series Anzacs, alongside Paul Hogan and Andrew Clarke.

From 1985 until 1986, Bell played original character Max Ramsay in soap opera Neighbours. Soon after the serial switched from the Seven Network to Network Ten, Bell abruptly left the show due to a serious back injury. Bell had intended to leave Neighbours before his back problems flared up. While negotiations were ongoing between his agent and the production company, Bell realised that he did not want to do the show anymore. He also took a fall on the set, which aggravated his back injury and left him with muscle spasms and pain. Bell filmed his final scenes in March 1986. To accommodate this loss, the new character of Max's brother Tom Ramsay (Gary Files) was hastily introduced. In the story Tom arrived to take the reins of Max's plumbing business while Max was away; behind the scenes the scriptwriters went through the scripts replacing "Max" with "Tom", with Tom speaking the dialogue written for Max.

After leaving Neighbours, Bell returned to recording voiceovers for commercials.

== Personal life ==
Bell married his partner of five years, Swedish textile designer Monica Dare in Melbourne on 27 March 1986. It was the second marriage for both of them. Bell and Dare separated six months after marrying. He is survived by his daughter.

On 3 May 1994, Bell was found dead after falling from a building in Auckland, New Zealand. The city's police released a statement stating that there were no suspicious circumstances regarding his death. His agent Graham Dunster later revealed that Bell had been hospitalised with depression prior to his death, and his death is believed to have been suicide. His former Neighbours co-stars Anne Haddy and Alan Dale paid tribute to him, with Dale calling Bell "one of the best actors I have ever worked with." The show's casting director Jan Russ also called him a "colourful and eccentric character" and said that "he was well liked and respected by everyone." Bell was buried at Purewa Cemetery.

== Filmography ==
- The Sullivans (TV series 1976)
- Sons and Daughters (TV series 1982)
- Who Killed Baby Azaria? (TV movie 1983)
- Five Mile Creek (TV series 1983)
- Anzacs (TV mini-series 1985)
- Glass Babies (Miniseries) (TV mini-series 1985)
- Rubbery Figures (TV series 1986)
- Neighbours (TV series 1985–1986) (191 episodes)
- Bushfire Moon (TV movie 1987)
- Against the Innocent (1989)
- The End of the Golden Weather (1991)
- Absent Without Leave (1992)
- Homeward Bound (TV series) (TV series 1992)
- Alexander Graham Bell: The Sound and the Silence (TV movie 1992)
- Hercules: The Legendary Journeys – Hercules and the Lost Kingdom (TV movie 1994)
- Mrs. Piggle-Wiggle (TV series 1994)
