= Reg Watson =

Australian television producer and screenwriter (1926–2019)

Reg Watson AM
- Born: Reginald James Watson; 27 August 1926; Brisbane, Queensland, Australia
- Died: 8 October 2019 (aged 93); Brisbane, Queensland, Australia
- Occupations: Television producer; screenwriter; executive
- Years active: 1942–1992
- Known for: Crossroads; Prisoner (known internationally as Prisoner: Cell Block H); Neighbours; The Young Doctors; Sons and Daughters

Reginald James Watson AM (27 August 1926 – 8 October 2019) was an Australian television producer, screenwriter and executive.

Watson was executive producer on the British soap opera Crossroads and created Australian media exports serials such as Prisoner, Neighbours, The Young Doctors and Sons and Daughters.

== Career ==
Watson was born on 27 August 1926, and grew up on a sugar farm in Queensland. He began his career as an actor at the age of sixteen on Australian radio firstly as an actor and then as an announcer, before moving to the UK in 1955.

He was soon hired by ATV and in 1956, joined Ned Sherrin and Noele Gordon in Birmingham to establish the base of ATV Midlands where his job was as head of Light Entertainment.

In this role, he created many programmes for the station with his first big hit being the live daily chat show Lunchbox. It ran from 1956 to 1964 for more than 3,000 editions with its presenter, Noele Gordon, becoming a regional celebrity. In 1958, Watson submitted a proposal to ATV for a new Midlands based soap opera; however, it was not until 1964 that Lew Grade, head of the company, granted approval for a series. Initially called The Midland Road, the project was renamed Crossroads by Watson just before its run began. Created by Hazel Adair and Peter Ling, it achieved audiences of 18 million.

After ten years producing Crossroads and eighteen years at ATV, he decided to return to Australia in 1973. Upon his return home, he took up the post of senior vice-president in charge of drama at Reg Grundy Productions. Thanks to his popular British soap, he was able to create many more series in Australia including Until Tomorrow (1975), The Young Doctors (1976), The Restless Years (1977), Prisoner (1979), Taurus Rising (1982), Sons and Daughters (1982), Waterloo Station (1983), Starting Out (1983), Possession (1985), and Richmond Hill (1988). Prisoner, Richmond Hill, Sons and Daughters and The Young Doctors later aired in the UK, with the first show known in Britain as Prisoner: Cell Block H in order to avoid confusion with Patrick McGoohan's surreal 1960s TV series.

The prominence he gained from Sons and Daughters helped his idea for Neighbours to be picked up by the Seven Network in 1985. After being cancelled by Seven that year owing to low ratings, it switched to the Ten Network at the start of 1986 and slowly its ratings climbed. Neighbours ended in July 2022 after 37 years but, four months later, it was announced that Neighbours was to return on FreeVee, and the first episode of the new series aired in September 2023. It is the longest-running drama series in Australian television history. At the 47th Annual TV Week Logie Awards held on 1 May 2005, Neighbours became the 22nd inductee into the TV Week Hall of Fame.

Watson also dabbled in television in the US, producing Dangerous Women, a short-lived soap opera based on the Australian Prisoner series.

== Personal life ==
Watson was a private man and rarely gave interviews. He took a sabbatical from Grundy Productions in December 1987, after working non-stop for 14 years. His duties were split among other Grundy staff, including Don Battye. He retired in 1992, and did not produce any new television drama from then.

On 26 January 2010, Watson was appointed a Member of the Order of Australia for services to the media as a pioneer in the creation and production of serial television drama.

On 8 October 2019, Watson died aged 93, after a short illness. Neighbours announced his death on its official Twitter account. The show's executive producer, Jason Herbison, described Watson as a "pioneer of drama", while writer Bevan Lee called him "a trailblazer in Australian commercial television drama". Both Lee and television historian Andrew Mercado believed Watson should be inducted into the Logie Hall of Fame.
