= Sharon Davies =

- Neighbours character
- Portrayed by: Jessica Muschamp
- Duration: 1988–1990, 2022–2023
- First appearance: 29 July 1988
- Last appearance: 8 November 2023
- Introduced by: Don Battye (1988); Jason Herbison (2022)
In-universe information
- Occupation: Coffee Shop waitress Student
- Father: Gordon Davies
- Mother: Katherine Davies
- Brothers: Bill Davies
- Sisters: Bronwyn Davies
- Aunts: Edith Chubb

Sharon Davies is a fictional character from the Australian soap opera Neighbours, played by Jessica Muschamp. She made her first appearance on 29 July 1988. Sharon is the younger sister of Bronwyn Davies (Rachel Friend). During her time in Neighbours, Sharon's storylines included setting fire to the coffee shop, a love triangle with Lucy Robinson (Sasha Close) and Nick Page (Mark Stevens), pushing Lucy into a swimming pool and developing an eating disorder. The character was written out in 1990 as part of a cast exodus and her departure aired on 7 June 1990. Muschamp reprised the role for a cameo appearance in the show's then-finale episode on 28 July 2022. In October 2023, Muschamp confirmed she would be returning for a guest stint. Sharon returned on 3 November 2023 and departed on 8 November 2023.

== Casting ==
While studying for her HSC at Toorak College in 1988, Muschamp attended an audition for the part of Sharon, the younger sister of Bronwyn Davies (played by Rachel Friend). Muschamp had intended to concentrate on her studies, but that changed when she learned about the Neighbours audition. She thought it would be a good experience and she did not expect to get the role. Muschamp was initially contracted for a 13-week guest stint and had to "juggle" her schoolwork and learning scripts. She stated: "I got the part in Neighbours very quickly and I've thrown myself into it wholeheartedly. But I haven't forgotten about the schoolwork. I want to get through this year at school and try to get into an arts course." Muschamp's character proved popular with viewers and she was soon promoted to the regular cast. During her time with Neighbours, Muschamp said she "had a ball" working with the other members of the cast.

== Development ==
=== Characterisation ===
Sharon is described as a "impetuous, laid back character." She is bubbly, but tactless. Sharon often insults people, but she does not mean to and she can be a little thoughtless. Muschamp explained that she is not similar to Sharon at all, but she liked her character. She said: "She has a lot of boyfriends, more than me! – a different once every week." Of her character's background, she explained "Sharon comes from a dusty isolated town and wants to come to the bright lights of the city." A reporter from Woman magazine called Sharon a "naughty teenager". In the first six months of portraying Sharon, Muschamp studied with an on-set tutor and passed her HSC. Then on-screen she was portraying the process via Sharon's schooling storylines.

The character joins her sister Bronwyn in Erinsborough after running away from home. The sisters both develop an attraction to the newly single Mike Young (Guy Pearce), but Bronwyn wins the battle by kissing him first. Muschamp told Darren Devvlyn of TV Week: "Sharon is more an 'easy-come, easy-go' sort of person than Bronwyn and the rivalry doesn't last all that long. Sharon is the type of person who simply moves on to something or someone else if she doesn't get what she wants." Muschamp also said that Sharon upsets a lot of people as she does not think before she acts, but she also finds herself in trouble for trying to help people. Using a storyline in which Sharon tries to help Nell Mangel (Vivean Gray) as an example, Muschamp explained that when her character learns that Mrs Mangel's electronic organ has broken down, she decides to take on the repairs herself. However, when she takes the organ apart, she does not know how to put it back together. Muschamp commented: "Mrs Mangel is not at all impressed. Sharon also goes out busking for money when things get a bit tight, but remains very casual. She is quite unpredictable."

In one of the character's more notable storylines, she attempts to lose weight by dieting. Muschamp said the storyline was created after she decided to lose weight herself. When she was asked if the producers had asked her to lose weight, Muschamp said, "Not at all. I was always a chubby teenager. Then after I left school, when I was already in Neighbours, I put on more weight. I decided to lose it and so they put Sharon dieting into the storyline." While discussing controversial topics covered by Neighbours, producer Mark Callan told Jim Schembri of The Age that the crew were not sure whether they should go ahead with the plot, as it "would probably cause a bit of a personal concern" with Muschamp, but Callan praised her for coping with it "magnificently". He added, "That was considered cruel at the time, and it was cruel the way that we handled it, yet I feel that the end product was something that was very real. The character, Sharon, had a real problem that she expressed very well."

=== Departure ===
In March 1990, Chrissie Camp of TV Week confirmed that Muschamp was being written out and her character "rested". Camp reported that Muschamp was due to finish filming in five weeks, with her final appearance airing in late June. Muschamp admitted that she had been thinking about leaving herself, so she thought it might be "a blessing in disguise". She told Camp: "Having come to terms with the decision that's been made, I'm really looking forward to what the next thing is. I'm looking forward to new challenges. I'm very excited about the future." Muschamp's departure was part of a cast exodus. She later explained the process, saying "They had the head-shots of all the different characters lined up above the mirrors and as people left, they'd turn them upside down, I remember dreading the day my head got turned". Writers decided to send the character to New Zealand. By that time, everyone around Sharon had gone – her boyfriend, her sister and her aunt. Of this, Muschamp said, "I think the producers felt her character had come to a natural conclusion, so she went off to stay with relatives." Muschamp thought some Neighbours viewers would be disappointed by Sharon's exit and hoped that the character had made an impact on the show. Muschamp struggled to find work following her departure. She added: "Neighbours was a double-edged sword, in many ways it opened a lot of doors but in other ways people thought I couldn't do anything else".

=== Returns ===
Muschamp reprised the role on 28 July 2022, as she made a cameo appearance in the show's then-final episode. Sharon sends a video message to her old friend Melanie Pearson (Lucinda Cowden), congratulating her on her wedding day. Laura Denby of the Radio Times noted, "it's a testament to Neighbours that so many former stars of the show have been happy to join the tributes." On 3 October 2023, it was announced Muschamp would be reprising the role for a guest stint, following the revival of the show. In a video posted to the show's social media accounts, Muschamp stated, "Shaz is back, at least for a little while. It's going to be so fun and I cannot wait for you to see it. Thank you so much for watching us, and thank you so much for saving the show. We'll see you soon." The character returns in the episode broadcast on 3 November, as she meets up with Nell Rebecchi (Ayisha Salem-Towner), who wants information about Melanie.

== Storylines ==
Sharon leaves home to find her sister Bronwyn Davies, but as she does not leave a note, Bronwyn is shocked to hear that her sister has run away. Harold Bishop (Ian Smith) catches Sharon leaving the Coffee Shop without paying for her meal and makes her work in the kitchen to pay for it. Sharon later turns up in Ramsay Street to see Bronwyn and Mrs Mangel agrees to let Sharon stay with her, Bronwyn, and Jane Harris (Annie Jones). Sharon manages to upset Mrs Mangel with her attitude and she is almost thrown out when she breaks Mrs Mangel's organ. Sharon befriends Todd Landers (Kristian Schmid) and they get themselves into trouble, she also begins dating Nick Page (Mark Stevens). Sharon's aunt, Edith Chubb (Irene Inescort), shows up and tries to persuade her to come home, but she later agrees to let her stay.

When Sharon is closing up the Coffee Shop one day, Vanessa Bailey (Gretchen Zoland) and Pam Muir (Pia Podporin), two girls from school arrive and offer her a cigarette. When the girls leave, Sharon throws the lit cigarette in the bin. Des Clarke (Paul Keane) later finds the kitchen on fire and he rushes inside with a fire extinguisher. The shop blows up and Des is rescued by Harold. Nick initially takes the blame for Sharon, but she admits the truth to Harold, who lets her keep her job.

When Lucy Robinson (Sasha Close) returns from boarding school, she develops a crush on Nick. After seeing Lucy flirting with Nick, Sharon pushes her into the pond outside the Lassiter's complex. The two girls become enemies, until they are asked to make up by their guardians. Edith rents her house to Hilary Robinson (Anne Scott-Pendlebury) and her son, Matt Robinson (Ashley Paske). Not long after, Sharon becomes obsessed about her weight and she stops eating for a long time. Later, while cleaning the pool, Sharon falls face down into the water and is rescued by Matt and Hilary. Sharon is reassured over her weight and she starts eating regularly again.

Sharon decides to spend all her time at the beach, but she does not use the right sun protection and suffers from heat stroke. She then starts to think of other ways to get tanned. She puts on some tan lotion, straightens her hair and wears Bronwyn's best dress to impress a surfer. Sharon begins seeing a different guy every week and she only stops when she is called names at school. Bronwyn goes to New Zealand to be with Henry Ramsay (Craig McLachlan), leaving Sharon devastated. She moves in with the Bishops, but later decides to move to New Zealand to live with her sister.

32 years later, Sharon sends a video message to Melanie Pearson congratulating her on her wedding to Toadfish Rebecchi (Ryan Moloney). Two years later, Toadie's daughter, Nell, contacts Sharon to find Melanie's whereabouts following her disappearance one year after the wedding. Sharon reassures her that Melanie is safe and later reveals Melanie's address to a concerned Jane. While leaving The 82, Sharon bumps into Eden Shaw (Costa D'Angelo), who has been hiding Melanie's secret of manslaughter against Krista Sinclair (Majella Davis), and Sharon warns Melanie that he is in town.

== Reception ==
The character of Sharon was popular with the boys and when she departed from the show, a writer for Woman said "There's no doubt that a few thousand teenage boys' hearts will break when Sharon says goodbye to Ramsay Street." The BBC said Sharon's most notable moment was "Causing the Coffee Shop to blow up!" In Neighbours: The Official Annual 1991, authors John McCready and Nicola Furlong said Muschamp had made her mark on Neighbours. They added "The love lives of those such as Nick Page and Sharon Davies have made the programme perhaps the most popular viewing for teenagers around the world." Jane Noone from TV Guide branded Sharon a "bubbly" character who was always getting into trouble with Nick. Following her brief 2022 return, Laura Denby from Radio Times stated that Sharon's return after a lengthy absence was "a testament to Neighbours that so many former stars of the show have been happy to join the tributes." A writer from Carmarthen Journal chose the episode featuring Sharon, Matt and Melissa Jarrett (Jade Amenta) hiding the damage to Hilary's piano in their pick of the day feature, "The Highlights".
