= Matt Robinson (Neighbours) =

- Neighbours character
- Portrayed by: Ashley Paske
- Duration: 1989–1991
- First appearance: 22 May 1989
- Last appearance: 19 March 1991
- Created by: Ray Kolle
- Introduced by: Don Battye
In-universe information
- Other names: Matt Williams (adoptive name)
- Occupation: Student; Mechanic; Barman
- Family: Robinson
- Father: Barry Dwyer
- Mother: Hilary Robinson
- Adoptive mother: Margaret Williams
- Other relatives: Jim Robinson; Paul Robinson; Scott Robinson; Glen Donnelly; Lucy Robinson

Matthew "Matt" Robinson (also Williams) is a fictional character from the Australian soap opera Neighbours, played by Ashley Paske. He made his first screen appearance during the episode broadcast on 22 May 1989. Paske secured the role after Neighbours' broadcaster, Network Ten wanted him to remain on their network after they cancelled the show Richmond Hill, which he had appeared in. Matt was introduced during a time Neighbours producers were creating new characters to rejuvenate the show. Matt was created by a team of several writers headed by Ray Kolle. They wanted to include a teenager unlike the others previously portrayed in the show. Producers also needed to fill the void met with the departure of popular character Scott Robinson (Jason Donovan), with Matt debuting a couple episodes after Scott departed. Kolle branded Matt a "cool" yet "remote" character who is "disinclined to be involved" with others. They also created a backstory in which he is revealed to be the long lost son of Hilary Robinson (Anne Scott-Pendlebury). Writers implemented a dyslexia story for Matt and they used this to create further issues between Matt and Hilary.

Paske has described that character as "dry", "dull" and "ordinary" in various media interviews. Matt's relationship stories have featured Lee Maloney (Maree Ackehurst) and Gemma Ramsay (Beth Buchanan). While paired with Gemma, writers added in a motorcycle crash stunt, which resulted in Gemma nearly having her leg amputated. Paske later left the series and Matt's exit story saw him moving back to Adelaide. He last appeared during episode broadcast on 19 March 1991.

== Casting ==
Ashley Paske had previously played the role of Marty Bryant on Richmond Hill, another soap opera which aired on Network Ten. When the show was cancelled the network wanted to keep Paske and his co-star Dina Panozzo in their television shows and placed the pair on a "developmental retainer". In between the show's cancellation and retainer, Paske auditioned for Home and Away and A Country Practice, which aired on their rival station Seven Network. Ten gave Paske a presenting role on their children's show Ridgey Didge. The developmental retainer lasted for eight months. He was promised a role in a drama that the network aired at the end of his retainer contract. This role was finalised as the part of Matt Williams.

When Paske was given the role, he relocated from his home in Wollongong to Melbourne for filming. Paske said that it helped him in approach to playing his character, because he could relate to Matt having to move to a new area. Paske's casting was publicised on 8 May 1989, just weeks prior to Matt's first on-screen appearance. A producer from the show, Mark Callan was hopeful of the success of the casting. He told Jackie Cockburn of Evening Times that Paske was "already making an impression here in Australia."

== Development ==
=== Creation ===
A team of seven scriptwriters headed by Ray Kolle were responsible for the creation of Matt. They met in an office on the Pacific Highway and discussed what Matt's personality and stories should be. Popular cast member Jason Donovan who played Scott Robinson had recently departed the series. Producers wanted Matthew, or Matt as they decided to nickname him, to fill that role. Matt was also created at a time the show was planning new characters to revamp the show. At that time, Callan stated the show had a hard working cast and "we have to challenge them by introducing new characters who test them in different relationships."

They already had Paske cast in the role. Barbara Toner from Radio Times noted that Paske had the good looks to fill Neighbours' quota of young male acting talent. The character was originally credited as Matt Williams, but Kolle wanted Matt introduced into the show's established Robinson family. The writers had already conjured up the idea that Matt would be the long-lost son of Hilary Robinson (Anne Scott-Pendlebury). Toner interviewed Kolle during the creation process and he explained that he wanted Matt to be different to the other teenagers previously featured in the series. Kolle did not want Matt to be portrayed as bad-tempered and unfriendly, but more disinclined to follow the crowd. He explained that "he's more remote - a little bit remote from the other kids, a bit cool, a bit disinclined to be involved." Kolle added that they were optimistic about the character's reception and wanted him to be likeable.

Another idea successfully pitched by the creative team was Matt having learning difficulties. With that they had to consider how it would contrast with Hilary's character. She was clever and writers did not make his difficulties too severe, but wanted them to be significant enough for Hilary to not be accepting of him. The learning difficulties Matt faced were portrayed as dyslexia. When the story aired on-screen it featured him struggling with his school work and needing special assistance to help his studies. His stories also had to fit the show's "moral code" they had developed for the broadcast time slot. The writers knew Matt would be a biker and questioned whether it would be appropriate for him to wear leathers. They also debated how he would discover Hilary was his mother and how his relationship with his adoptive parents would be.

=== Characterisation and introduction ===
Prior to the characters first appearance he was compared to Scott Robinson, who leaves the series a few episodes prior to Matt's arrival. While producers were keen to fill the void left by the character's departure, Paske thought the comparisons were unfair. He told Sean Whittington from Sunday Mail TV Plus that "he played a totally different character and we're totally different in real life. I suppose it's just natural for people to make comparisons like that." He added that "generally he's a nice ordinary sort of teenager." Paske told Ian Morrison in Neighbours: The Official Annual that "maybe Matt is a bit too like Ashley Paske" In another interview, Paske said Matt was nothing like his previous roles, adding "Matt's not going to be such a goody." Matt is characterised as a troubled teenager and has issues with his parents. Paske told Darren Devlyn from TV Week that Matt is hard to categorise, adding "he's not good or bad but has a lot of personal problems." Paske did not think that Matt was very interesting after playing him for one year. He told Jane Noone from TV Guide that "Matt's a bit dry and dull in some ways."

Matt's wardrobe consisted of over-sized clothing, which Paske believed was a result of time restrictions that meant a lack of character wardrobe fittings. Paske told Caroline Westbrook from TV Hits that he would often arrive on-set in clothes that fit him. However, when he went to the wardrobe department to change into Matt's attire, the jeans, shirts and jackets were always too big. Paske also disliked scenes in which Matt was wearing swimming attire because he felt over weight while on the show. He told Westbrook that on one occasion he received a letter asking him to lose weight and another expressing their dislike of his hair style. Paske said that Matt sported a hair cut similar to that of the footballer Paul Gascoigne because of changes made by the show's production team.

The show's script writers created a detailed backstory for the character in which he was adopted by the Williams family. He enjoyed a good childhood and loved his parents. Matt discovered he was adopted when he needed his birth certificate to apply for his motorcycle driving license. This forced his parents to tell him the truth about his adoption. Matt had the need to seek-out his birth parents, which led him to Ramsay Street. Paske's first scenes aired in May 1989. He is new to Erinsborough and does not know the local residents. Having moved from interstate to accept the role, Paske believed this helped him to better play Matt as they were going through similar experiences. Matt's arrival in the show causes other character's to question his motives for being in Erinsborough. Paske told Whittington that "Matt is from Adelaide and his parents are having a few marital problems. Paske added that "a few people question his arrival" and Matt soon gets into an argument with another character. The character Matt upsets is his neighbour, Mike Young (Guy Pearce) and it forms one of his first stories. When Matt uses Mike's bike without consent, it brings about the confrontation. Paske told Devlyn that Matt "doesn't exactly get off on the right foot because he later finds out that Mike is his maths teacher."

Callan told Cockburn (Evening Times) that when Matt arrives in Erinsborough, he would be hiding a "dark secret". Matt shocks the residents with the announcement that he is the son of Hilary. Matt is disappointed when Hilary rejects him because she fears being shamed for having an illegitimate child resulting from a short lived romance when she was twenty. He did not give up his quest to acquaint himself with the Robinson family and forced Hilary to reveal his true identity. With the truth revealed Matt and Hilary forge a steady relationship.

=== Relationships ===
Writers developed a couple of romance storylines for the character. In March 1990, Paske stated the character best suited to Matt romantically would have been Bronwyn Davies (Rachel Friend). But writers portrayed him having an unrequited love for Brownyn's sister, Sharon Davies (Jessica Muschamp). His next story was a short-lived relationship with Lee Maloney (Maree Ackehurst). In November 1989, Paske was "anxiously awaiting" Matt's first relationship story with Lee. He told Devlyn TV Week that viewers would have to wait until the episodes aired, but was "excited" about the story. The couple soon became serious about their relationship following Lee leaving home due to her difficult relationship with her parents. Writers soon had them living in a flat together, but Lee ultimately decided that she was too young to settle down and they broke up.

Writers later developed a romance with Gemma Ramsay (Beth Buchanan). Once Gemma had finished her exams Matt was the reason she chose to remain in Erinsborough. Writers progressed their relationship quickly, with Matt and Gemma moving into together. Their living arrangements annoy Gemma's family, Madge Bishop (Anne Charleston) and Harold Bishop (Ian Smith) but their relationship continues to strengthen. The pair were involved in a motorbike crash story in which Gemma nearly had to have her leg amputated. The story was previewed in the 29 December 1990 issue of TV Week, in which a writer revealed that the story would begin in early 1991. They adding "the romance shows no signs of cooling and heats up" when Matt decides to buy Gemma a motorbike. They both go on a bike ride but crash into a truck, with Gemma taking the brunt of the impact. They concluded that Matt would be "overcome with guilt" and face the prospect of losing Gemma. The story also pitched Matt and Gemma's disapproving father Tom Ramsay (Gary Files) against each other. In her book The Neighbours Programme Guide, author Josephine Monroe wrote that Tom "took every opportunity to attack Matt for being irresponsible and unsuitable for his beloved daughter." Writers created more problems for Matt an Gemma when they introduced her ex-boyfriend Aidan Devlin (Blake Collins) into the show. Their relationship is fraught because Gemma is "confused" by Aidan's arrival and Matt is upset with the situation. These dilemmas lead to the breakdown of their relationship and Gemma tries to move on.

=== Departure ===
On 8 December 1990, it was announced that Paske had decided to leave Neighbours and would not renew his contract once it expired in January 1991. He told Chrissie Camo from TV Week that it was not a hard decision to make. He explained "it's just time to move on. It gets to the point you don't feel right anymore, you don't feel happy anymore." He added that he was called "brave" because he was leaving financial and job security, but Paske, then aged twenty wanted to pursue other projects. Paske also believed Neighbours did not make him internationally famous and wealthy like his other co-stars. He also revealed that he was unhappy with Matt's character development following him leaving school and moving in with Gemma. Paske believed scriptwriters were struggling to create new stories and told Camp that "he's a bit in no mans land and I think there's been a problem in dealing with him as such. He can't just muck around with the other kids anymore."

Paske did not want a vapid exit story for Matt and wished producers had killed the character off. Paske wanted a "spectacular" departure scene and liked the idea of filming his death. Paske's ideas were not developed, as Camp correctly reported that Matt's departure story would depict him moving back to Adelaide. Matt's departure was broadcast in March 1991 and was devised around his break-up with Gemma. His final scenes see him accuse Gemma of having sex with Aidan. She denies this and eventually believes her. Matt decides he cannot trust Gemma and decides to leave Erinsborough. Paske had left the series to pursue acting work in the United Kingdom. In 1997, Paske was interviewed on Lizzy Gardiner’s Story of the Fame Game about his career. Paske told Gardiner that he did not regret his involvement in Neighbours, but thought that being typecast affected him securing further acting work in Australia.

== Storylines ==
Matt arrives at Number 30 with Hilary, initially as a house guest and surprises Sharon, who is staying there, who was expecting him to be much older and stuffier. Matt quickly makes friends with Sharon and her boyfriend, Nick Page (Mark Stevens). Matt later attends Erinsborough High and agrees to help Nick out in a skateboarding competition against Nick's nemesis, Bruce Zadro (Myles Collins). When Hilary mentions Matt's father in a conversation, Matt, knowing that Hilary is his biological mother, presses her further and she reveals that she had given him up for adoption because she was young at the time. When Sharon begins to get suspicious, Hilary tries to keep Matt's identity secret from her and the rest of the Neighbours. Matt urges Hilary to tell the truth, but she is adamant she will not.

Matt has enough and threatens to return to Adelaide, Hilary thinks he is bluffing and tells him she won't be emotionally blackmailed. Matt is serious and only when he mentions it at the engagement party of Des Clarke (Paul Keane) and Jane Harris (Annie Jones), Hilary reveals the truth to everyone that Matt is her son. Shortly after, Matt decides to change his surname to Robinson. After losing in a practice quiz, it is revealed Matt that is dyslexic. Matt's teacher Mike agrees to help him with his studies. When Toby Mangel (Finn Greentree-Keane) and Tiffany "Lochy" McLachlan (Amber Kilpatrick) discover a house they believe to be haunted, Matt scoffs but when Lochy runs into the house, he follows her to find the "ghost" is teenage runaway Lee.

Matt and Lee become friends and he offers for her to stay with him, Hilary and Sharon at Number 30 and Hilary's neighbour, Kerry Bishop (Linda Hartley) lends Lee some spare clothes. When Hilary returns home to discover Lee in a towel and jumps to conclusions about Lee and Matt. Matt quickly invents a story that Lee is an old friend from Adelaide whose belongings were lost on the bus. Once the truth emerges about the lie, Hilary is quick to throw Lee out but grudgingly relents when Matt asks her to let Lee stay. After an argument, Matt kisses Lee and they begin dating. Over Christmas 1989, Matt goes home to spend Christmas with his adoptive parents. On his return, he is suspicious of Nick and Lee spending so much time together. Nick assures him they're just friends and they spent a lot of time together while Matt and most of their friends were away.

Matt's decision to drop out of school and become an apprentice mechanic for Hilary's cousin, Jim is met with initial reservation from Hilary but after realising it is what Matt wants to do, she gives him her blessing. Barry Dwyer (Chris Waters), Matt's biological father arrives in Erinsborough and Matt meets him at Lassiter's. Matt and Barry have a conversation and Matt decides he doesn't want to complicate things further as he's happy with Hilary and his adoptive parents. After Hilary moves back to Adelaide, Matt and Lee move into a flat but quickly leave when the landlord begins hassling Lee. They begin squatting at the emptied Number 30. After Jim finally catches the couple, he comes up with a solution; Matt stay at Number 26 and Lee at Number 28. On the day of Nick's departure for London, Lee disappears leaving Matt a letter. Matt's 18th birthday approaches and he is no mood to celebrate, but after Kerry and her husband, Joe Mangel (Mark Little) have a talk with him, he feels better and later he receives another letter from Lee, telling him about her new job up North. After an argument with Jim, who is having marital difficulties with his wife Beverly, Matt moves in with Des and Melanie Pearson (Lucinda Cowden) at Number 28.

When Gemma arrives to stay with her aunt, Madge, Matt falls for her and they begin dating. Madge is opposed as Gemma is in her final year of school, but the couple continue seeing each other. After Des sells Number 28 to the Willis family, Matt moves in with Joe and supports him when Kerry is shot dead during a protest. Shortly after Kerry's funeral, Matt shocks Gemma with his revelation that he was in love with Kerry but knew nothing could come of it as she was Joe's wife. Gemma is stunned but understanding, much to Matt's surprise. At the end of 1990, Matt and Gemma are involved in a serious motorcycle accident when Matt swerves to avoid a reversing lorry. Both are taken to hospital, Matt escapes with stitches in his leg, a bruised arm and mild concussion, while Gemma is told she may lose a leg. Tom, Gemma's father blames Matt for the accident and tells him to keep away from Gemma. Matt and Tom eventually build bridges before Tom leaves for Brisbane. Gemma's boyfriend, Aidan Devlin (Blake Collins) arrives back in Erinborough, with the intention to win her back. Matt is annoyed by this and punches Aidan. Matt and Gemma then break up and Matt leaves Erinsborough to take care of Hilary's house in Adelaide. Matt later sends Melanie a postcard to say he is enjoying himself in Adelaide. In 2015, Hilary tells Paul that Matt now lives in Perth with his wife and that they had become estranged again.

== Reception ==
In Neighbours: The Official Annual 1991, John McCready and Nicola Furlong said Paske was following in Jessica Muschamp and Anne Scott-Pendlebury's footsteps in a "rise to the top" in making his mark on Neighbours. The BBC said Matt's most notable moment was his "motorbike accident with Gemma." A reporter from The Sydney Morning Herald opined that Paske was just a replacement for Jason Donovan who play Scott Robinson. Rachel Browne of The Sun-Herald said that as Matt, Paske won a legion of fans and became a teen magazine cover boy. TV Guide's Jane Noone opined Paske and Stevens were one another's competition in the Neighbours "heart throb stakes". A writer from Carmarthen Journal chose the episode featuring Matt, Sharon and Melissa Jarrett (Jade Amenta) hiding the damage to Hilary's piano in their pick of the day feature, "The Highlights".
