= List of Neighbours characters introduced in 1988 =

Neighbours is an Australian television soap opera that was first broadcast on 18 March 1985. The following is a list of characters that first appeared in the serial in 1988, by order of first appearance. Until February, characters were introduced by the soap's creator and executive producer, Reg Watson. Thereafter, they were introduced by his successor, Don Battye. Battye's episodes began airing from 14 March. The 4th season of Neighbours began airing from 13 January 1988. February saw the introduction of Sally Jensen and Kristian Schmid as siblings Katie Landers and Todd Landers. Comedian Greg Fleet began portraying criminal Dave Summers in March. Tom Oliver began playing Lou Carpenter in the same month. Gloria Lewis was introduced in April, followed by David Bishop, Amy Williams and Nina Williams in May. John Worthington was introduced the following month. July saw the arrivals of Bronwyn Davies, played by Rachel Friend, her sister Sharon Davies, played by Jessica Muschamp, and Mark Stevens as Nick Page. Mark Little began playing Joe Mangel, son of the established Nell Mangel from August. Irene Inescort arrived as Bronwyn and Sharon's aunt, Edith Chubb in the same month. September saw the debut of Sylvie Latham. Mat Stevenson took on the role of Skinner in October, and Joe's son Toby Mangel made his first appearance in November, as did Colin Handley as Mark Granger.

== Katie Landers ==
Katie Landers, played by Sally Jensen, made her first appearance on 15 February 1988. Jensen and Kristian Schmid, who plays Katie's brother Todd Landers, had not met before or had any acting experience until they attended a drama class with the Actor's Training Studio in Melbourne. Scouts from the Grundy Organisation were also in attendance, on the look out for a pair of actors for Neighbours. Jensen and Schmid attended an audition for the roles of regular characters, Katie and Todd, and following a screen test, they were cast. Both actors were at school when they were cast, so they were given an on set tutor and a schoolroom was built behind the studio. The BBC said Katie's most notable moment was "Forcing Joe Mangel to bury a casserole." The Sun-Herald said Katie and Todd's escapades often portrayed storylines which were "vital themes in the show."

== Todd Landers ==
Todd Landers, played by Kristian Schmid, made his first appearance on 15 February 1988. Schmid was 12 years old when he signed himself up for an acting course in Melbourne. Three weeks later, Neighbours casting director Jan Russ came to the school to hold auditions for the show. Russ said she was looking for a teenage boy, around 14 or 15, to play the role of Todd Landers. Schmid asked to audition and he was cast in the role of Todd. Todd was Beverly Marshall's (Lisa Armytage) "cheekily independent nephew". He and his sister Katie Landers (Sally Jensen), come to live with Beverly and her husband Jim Robinson (Alan Dale) in Ramsay Street in order to escape their abusive father. Schmid remained with Neighbours until his character was killed off at the age of 17, making him the youngest character in the show's history to die. In 2007, Australian newspaper the Herald Sun placed Todd's death at number ten on their list of Neighbours Top Ten moments.

== Dave Summers ==
Dave Summers
- Neighbours character
- Portrayed by: Greg Fleet
- First appearance: 25 March 1988
- Last appearance: 2 May 1988
- Introduced by: Don Battye

Dave Summers, played by Greg Fleet, made his first appearance on 25 March 1988. The character was introduced alongside Ted Regan (Julian Branagan) as new villains for the serial. Fleet's character is best known for causing the death of popular character Daphne Clarke (Elaine Smith). When asked about his character's actions, Fleet responded: "Do I feel bad about killing Daphne on Neighbours? If you are going to be in a show as bad as Neighbours, you should kill one of the main characters." In Fleet's biography These Things Happen, he tells of how his role prevented him from having his throat cut in a drug deal gone wrong, as the dealer recognised him from the show. Series writer Marieke Hardy described Fleet's role as "small but important". Prior to playing Summers, Fleet guested as Steve O'Donnel on the serial in 1985.

Summers and his friend Ted Regan run Daphne Clarke and Gail Robinson's (Fiona Corke) car off the road, causing a crash which leaves Gail with amnesia and Daphne in a coma for several weeks. Summers and Regan are caught by Jane Harris (Annie Jones), Charlene Robinson (Kylie Minogue), Tony Romeo (Nick Carrafa), Jim Robinson (Alan Dale) and Paul Robinson (Stefan Dennis) when their car is spotted at Lassiter's by Gail, who recalls the license plate via hypnosis. Daphne dies as a result of her injuries and Summers and Regan are both tried, but Summers only receives a one-year suspension of his license and a $500 fine, which enrages Mike Young (Guy Pearce). Mike goes after Summers and Regan to fight them, but does not. Summers then reports Mike to the police and he is charged with GBH, despite being innocent. Regan smugly tells to Mike that someone else had beaten Summers and they decided to let him take the blame. However, this is exposed as a lie by Scott Robinson (Jason Donovan) and Henry Ramsay (Craig McLachlan) who set a trap for Summers by taking photos of him removing his cast and bending over to pick up a wallet dropped by Scott. In spite of the evidence produced by Scott and Henry, Mike is then found guilty of simple assault and given a 12-month Good behaviour bond.

== Lou Carpenter ==
Lou Carpenter, played by Tom Oliver, made his first appearance on 30 March 1988. Oliver appeared for a brief time, having been initially contracted for six months, before leaving and returning in January 1992 as a regular cast member. He would go on to become one of the longest-serving continuous characters. Lou was introduced as an old friend of Harold Bishop (Ian Smith) and Madge Ramsay (Anne Charleston). In their fictional backstory, the characters attended the same school and Lou was Harold's rival for Madge's affections. Oliver said that Lou's feelings for Madge led him to visit Ramsay Street to steal her from Harold on their wedding day. Oliver took inspiration for Lou's distinctive "dirty laugh" from actor Sid James. The character also became known for his scams and quick one-liners. Oliver received nominations for Funniest Performance at the 2007 and 2008 Inside Soap Awards.

== Gloria Lewis ==
Gloria Lewis
- Neighbours character
- Portrayed by: Beverly Phillips
- Duration: 1988–1990
- First appearance: 22 April 1988
- Last appearance: 29 March 1990
- Introduced by: Don Battye
In-universe information
- Other names: Gloria Gardner
- Occupation: Barmaid
- Husband: Rob Lewis (1988–1989)
- Sons: Dean Gardner

Gloria Lewis (also Gardner), played by Beverly Phillips, made her first appearance on 22 April 1988. Gloria is introduced as Rob Lewis' (Ernie Bourne) fiancée. Phillips said Rob's daughter Gail Robinson (Fiona Corke) is expecting to be introduced to someone nice and charming like her mother, so when Gloria turned up "Gail's jaw hit the deck!". Phillips was pleased that she was not a "constant" regular and allowed to come and go by the production company. She often worked on the show for a few months, then took a few months off to appear in other productions. Phillips told Neil Bonner of the Reading Evening Post that Gloria would go off in one scene to get some wine and then would not be seen for a month. Phillips also recalled a time when producers called to book her for a few episodes and were told that she had lost weight through a diet, so they decided to write it into the scripts.

Gloria was compared to Bet Lynch from British soap Coronation Street because of their similar taste in "tacky" outfits. Phillips told Bonner: "Nothing is too over-the-top for Gloria. And from what I hear about Bet Lynch I think my character could learn a thing of two!" The characters also shared similar occupations as Gloria works in the local pub as a barmaid. Phillips explained that the costume department "have a field day" with Gloria's outfits. They often went on shopping sprees to find dreadful dresses and then made them worse. She would also spend an hour having her make-up applied and her hair teased out to make it bigger. Phillips loved playing Gloria, as she felt the role helped to fulfil a dream of being youthful. She told Bonner that she had always wanted to wear too much make-up, high heels and big earrings, but her mother did not approve. She joked that her "outrageous urges" were hidden away until Gloria came along. As Gloria's image was such a contrast to Phillips' own, she was rarely recognised in public. She also admitted that she based the character on an aunt, saying "The essential thing about Gloria is that she thinks that what she wears is smart. I have an aunt just like that. Basically, she just has no taste!"

Gloria meets widower Rob Lewis and they quickly fall in love and Rob proposes. Gloria's son Dean Gardner (Andrew Larkins) and Rob's daughter Gail Robinson object, but both realise Rob and Gloria are in love and soon give their blessing. Rob and Gloria marry then return to Erinsborough and Gloria begins working at Rob's local pub, The Waterhole. When Dean graduates from law school and lands a position with a local law firm, he is worried Gloria and Rob will embarrass him at his graduation party. However, when he realises Gloria knows one of his clients, he apologises for his behaviour towards her. Rob is later involved in a car crash and dies, leaving Gloria devastated. She is later menaced by Sid, the man who sold Rob some stolen car parts and fearing for her own safety, she begins staying with Paul Robinson (Stefan Dennis), much to his irritation. After Paul's house is trashed, Gloria agrees to testify against Sid. Gloria makes her last appearance working at the coffee shop, letting customers smuggle in their own alcohol much to the chagrin of Harold Bishop (Ian Smith).

== David Bishop ==
David Bishop, played by Kevin Harrington, made his first appearance during the episode broadcast on 11 May 1988, arriving for his father Harold Bishop's (Ian Smith) wedding. Harrington returned to Neighbours after a 16-year absence in October 2003. The character, his wife and daughter were written out in 2005, as part of a "surprise shake-up" of the cast. A writer for the BBC's Neighbours website stated that David's most notable moment was "Getting himself into financial trouble and keeping it a secret." Brian Courtis from The Age branded David "Harold's hapless offspring".

== Nene Williams ==
Nene Williams
- Neighbours character
- Portrayed by: Leigh Morgan (1988); Ally Fowler (2016)
- Duration: 1988, 2016
- First appearance: 25 May 1988
- Last appearance: 12 April 2016
- Introduced by: Don Battye (1988); Jason Herbison (2016)
In-universe information
- Other names: Nina Williams
- Occupation: Stewardess; Businesswoman; Nurse
- Husband: Bruce (divorced)
- Daughters: Amy Williams
- Grandsons: Jimmy Williams

Nene Williams (also Nina Williams) made her first appearance on 25 May 1988. She was originally played by Leigh Morgan. When the character was reintroduced in 2016, Ally Fowler took over the role. Fowler previously appeared in Neighbours as Zoe Davis. She commented, "It's not difficult to go full circle on Neighbours. The writers are very clever with the way that they can link people together. I love being back with Stefan again, we're having a lot of fun." Fowler admitted to some apprehension about joining the cast again, as she likes to move forward, but knowing the role was short term, she thought it would be fun. Fowler began filming in late 2015, and began appearing from 29 February 2016.

Nene is Amy Williams's (Zoe Cramond) mother, and former partner of Paul Robinson (Stefan Dennis), who she met while she was an air stewardess. Upon her return, she "immediately ruffles feathers" when she sets her sights on one of the married characters, later confirmed to be Karl Kennedy (Alan Fletcher) after he rescues her during a heatwave. Network Ten drama executive Claire Tonkin called Nene "complex" and stated: "from her first moments on Ramsay Street, this character promises intrigue, secrets and lots of drama". Of her character's reasons for coming to Erinsborough, Fowler explained that Nene is angry with Paul for not helping her or being a proper father to Amy over the years. She said, "I think there's a desperate need in [Nene] to have family and to experience what having a family would be like and have that support, so in that way she craves Paul's support." Fowler also said that Paul would end up using Nene for his own gain.

When her grandson Jimmy Williams (Darcy Tadich) is injured playing cricket, Nene makes some questionable choices while treating him, leading Amy to ask Karl for a second opinion. Nene feels that Amy does not trust her, and Fowler explained to an Inside Soap writer that Nene has anxiety. She continued, "She's had a few problems in the past with her career – she's got involved with the odd doctor that she shouldn't have, which hasn't ended well – and she's had to play with the truth a little bit so that Amy doesn't worry." Knowing that Karl and Amy are watching her, she invents a crisis with Doug Willis (Terence Donovan), who she is caring for. Nene and Paul later share a kiss, and Nene enjoys playing "happy families" with him, Amy and Jimmy. She finds it comforting, but is unaware that Paul has an ulterior motive.

Nina organises a women in the workplace conference at Lassiter's Hotel in Erinsborough, and brings her young daughter Amy with her. She befriends Gail Robinson (Fiona Corke) and invites her to give a talk at the conference when Gail mentions she is married to her boss. Nina is surprised to learn that Gail's husband is Paul Robinson, who she once dated while they worked for the same airline. Gail invites Nina to dinner with her and Paul, but Nina declines the invitation. Paul seeks her out and asks about her life. She explains that she started her own business, fell pregnant with Amy and will be getting married soon. Paul soon works out that Amy is his daughter. Nina tells him that she did not know she was pregnant until after their break up. She also tells him that her fiancé Bruce already thinks of Amy as his own and she is leaving that day. Paul asks to be a part of Amy's life, but Nina refuses. Gail tells Nina that Amy might be the only child Paul has. Before she leaves, Nina visits Paul to tells him that she will send him photos of Amy, as well as allowing him to set up a trust fund for Amy's education. Several years later, when Nina and Bruce go through marital problems, Nina sends Amy to live with Paul in Erinsborough for a few months after he visits her in New Zealand.

Over twenty years later, Nina, now calling herself Nene, returns to Erinsborough in the middle of a massive heatwave. She meets her grandson, Jimmy Williams and goes for walk with him, but collapses due to the extreme heat. Karl Kennedy finds Nene and gets her safely to hospital. Amy visits Nene and wants to know what she is doing in town. Nene tells her she has quit her nursing job in Mount Merrion and moved to Erinsborough for a fresh start. Nene develops feelings for Karl, who she assumes is single, but he tells her he is married. Nene is discharged from hospital and stays with Amy and Jimmy at Number 26, along with Amy's boyfriend Kyle Canning (Chris Milligan) and his family. Amy asks Karl if there are any nursing jobs available at the hospital and Karl agrees to meet with Nene. Nene discloses that she left her previous job because she had an affair with a doctor who blamed her for a mistake after they split. When the arranged interview falls through, Karl arranges for Nene to be Alzheimer's sufferer Doug Willis' carer.

In her new position, Nene manipulates situations to spend more time with Karl by lying about Doug's mood swings and calls Karl during a birthday lunch much to the irritation of his wife, Susan Kennedy (Jackie Woodburne). She also begins confusing Doug by claiming she is his wife Pam Willis (Sue Jones), uses Karl's laptop to delete an email from a former colleague, and tracks correspondence between Kyle and his former wife, Georgia Brooks (Saskia Hampele). However, Doug is able to see through her act and tells the Kennedys, who confront Nene about her erratic behaviour. Nene admits that she has not been taking her anti-depressant medication. Doug agrees not to report Nene, as he knows what it is like to lose control of his own mind. Following this, Nene turns to Paul for support and falls for him again. When she tries to kiss him, Paul rebuffs Nene and lets her down gently. When an explosion occurs at Lassiter's hotel, Nene puts on a nurse's uniform and attempts to treat a comatose Jack Callaghan (Andrew Morley), but Doug's granddaughter, Paige Smith (Olympia Valance) recognises her and she flees. When Paul is accused of causing the explosion, he asks Nene to provide an alibi for him and she does so, but retracts it when she sees Paul kissing Terese Willis (Rebekah Elmaloglou). She then leaves Erinsborough to stay in a retreat in the Blue Mountains and receives treatment for her condition.

== Amy Williams ==
Amy Williams (previously Robinson) made her first appearance on 25 May 1988. She was originally played by Nicolette Minster. Minster was around three years old when she was cast in the role. Amy was introduced to Neighbours as the first child of established character Paul Robinson (Stefan Dennis). When the character returned to the show in 1992, Sheridan Compagnino took over the role. Amy was reintroduced to Neighbours with actress Zoe Cramond taking over the role in 2015. Cramond described Amy as "very straightforward yet quite complex". A Soap World contributor branded her "mysteriously sexy and tomboyish".

== John Worthington ==
John Worthington
- Neighbours character
- Portrayed by: Brian James
- First appearance: 9 June 1988
- Last appearance: 24 October 1988
- Introduced by: Don Battye
In-universe information
- Occupation: Retired dentist
- Wife: Iris Worthington (until 1987); Nell Mangel (1988–; his death)
- Daughters: Caroline Worthington

John Worthington, played by Brian James, made his first appearance on 9 June 1988. The character was introduced as a love interest for Nell Mangel (Vivean Gray). He and Nell become bowling colleagues and share "a strong and mutual need for love and companionship." The couple soon become engaged. Shortly before the wedding, Nell has second thoughts, while John needs reassurance from Des Clarke (Paul Keane) and Paul Robinson (Stefan Dennis). James commented, "He does have a few anxious moments before Nell arrives." Nell and John became the third couple to marry in 1988.

John is a widowed, retired dentist. He meets Nell Mangel when she joins the local bowls team. There is an attraction between them, but their relationship breaks down when John tires of Nell's gossipy ways. However, John reappears several months later and they get reacquainted. Nell's son, Joe Mangel (Mark Little) takes a dislike to John and throws him out of the house. Joe later warms to John and gives him his blessing to marry Nell. When a 30-year-old letter written by John's late wife Iris reveals his infidelity, Nell breaks off the engagement. But she eventually realises John's affair was a long time ago and the wedding goes ahead. John and Nell bid farewell to all their friends in Erinsborough and relocate to St. Albans. When Nell's granddaughter, Jane Harris (Annie Jones) returns to Erinsborough in 2018, she mentions that John has since died.

== Bronwyn Davies ==
Bronwyn Davies played by Rachel Friend. She made her first appearance on 7 July 1988. Following Kylie Minogue's (Charlene Robinson) departure, the Neighbours producers were about to begin a nation-wide search for a new female actress to join the show, when they discovered Friend. Friend chose to postpone her university degree to join Neighbours as country girl, Bronwyn Davies. In 1990, Friend decided to quit the serial. For her portrayal of Bronwyn, Friend won "Most Popular Actress" at the 1990 Logie Awards. During a feature on past Neighbours characters, telecommunications network Orange, described Bronwyn's most memorable moment as: "Accidentally pushing good pal Henry Ramsay (played by Craig McLachlan) down some steps. Believing the mulleted larrikin was unconscious, Bronwyn rushed to his side and professed her undying love for him – whereupon Henry opened his eyes and admitted he felt the same. Aaah!"

== Nick Page ==
Nick Page, played by Mark Stevens, made his first appearance on 22 July 1988. Stevens joined the cast of Neighbours soon after taking part in Young Talent Time. Stevens' first scene consisted of Nick trying to find his stolen Walkman. Josephine Monroe, author of Neighbours: the first 10 years described Nick as one Helen Daniels' (Anne Haddy) many waifs and strays, a budding artist and having a recalcitrant personality. The BBC described Nick's most notable moment as being "his first appearance when he was caught spraying graffiti". The episode featuring Nick rescuing Todd and Katie from Skinner was watched by 21 million viewers in the United Kingdom. It was the most watched episode of any show during 1990.

== Sharon Davies ==
Sharon Davies, played by Jessica Muschamp, made her first appearance on 29 July 1988. Muschamp landed the role while completing her VCE in 1988. Muschamp said she thought the audition would be a good experience and that she did not expect to get the role. During her time with Neighbours, Muschamp said she "had a ball" working with the other members of the cast. Sharon is described as an "impetuous, laid back character." She is bubbly, but tactless. Sharon often insults people, but she does not mean to and she can be a little thoughtless. In 1990, during a cast exodus, producers decided to send the character to New Zealand. In Neighbours: The Official Annual 1991, authors John McCready and Nicola Furlong said Muschamp had made her mark on Neighbours. They added "The love lives of those such as Nick Page and Sharon Davies have made the programme perhaps the most popular viewing for teenagers around the world."

== Joe Mangel ==
Joe Mangel, played by Mark Little, made his first appearance on 8 August 1988. Little was initially contracted for 13 weeks, but this was soon extended. Joe is the estranged son of Nell Mangel (Vivean Gray). Very little was known about Joe prior to his introduction, and Darren Devlyn branded him "an unknown quantity in Erinsborough". Joe is nothing like his mother, and he was described as being an "unreconstructed oaf who likes drinking beer", green fingered and brutish. Nell and Dorothy Burke (Maggie Dence) attempt to make Joe change his ways, and he often clashes with his niece Jane Harris (Annie Jones). Little chose to leave the serial in 1991. Lorna Cooper, editor of MSN TV, branded Joe one of show's legendary characters. While the Daily Mirror's Polly Hudson chose Joe as one of her favourite characters, citing his "funny, sweet and ute-obsessed" personality and comedy moments as her reasons why.

== Edith Chubb ==
Edith Chubb
- Neighbours character
- Portrayed by: Irene Inescort
- Duration: 1988–1989
- First appearance: 10 August 1988
- Last appearance: 24 February 1989
- Introduced by: Don Battye
In-universe information
- Brothers: Gordon Davies
- Grandfathers: Arthur
- Nephews: Bill Davies
- Nieces: Bronwyn Davies; Sharon Davies

Edith "Edie" Chubb, played by Irene Inescort, made her first appearance on 10 August 1988 and departed on 24 February 1989. Edie is the aunt of Bronwyn Davies (Rachel Friend) and Sharon Davies (Jessica Muschamp). She purchases Number 30 Ramsay Street and moves in with her nieces. Grace Dent of The Guardian commented that Edie had an echo of Coronation Street's Ena Sharples.

Edie arrives in Erinsborough in the middle of a Murder Mystery party her nieces Bronwyn and Sharon are attending. She tries to take Sharon back to Narrabri, but she refuses to leave, so Edie allows the girls to stay with Nell Mangel (Vivean Gray). Sharon learns Edie is planning to buy Number 30 and that she has asked Des Clarke (Paul Keane) to be a proxy bidder for her. Sharon tries to derail the auction by disguising herself as an elderly woman and attempting to drive the price up. Sharon succeeds, but Des quickly sees through the ruse and Sharon's bid is voided, and Edie buys the house. When Edie returns several weeks later, she is unimpressed to find Bronwyn and Sharon kissing their respective boyfriends Mike Young (Guy Pearce) and Nick Page (Mark Stevens). Edie then moves the girls in with her and tries to control their lives, but Sharon manages to manipulate Edie into letting her see Nick when she gets stuck in a tree attempting to rescue her cat, Arthur.

Edie is less than pleased when Bronwyn begins dating Henry Ramsay (Craig McLachlan), but is delighted when they break up, however, she is horrified when they reconcile. Edie also embarks on a feud with neighbour Joe Mangel (Mark Little). This culminates in Joe playing a practical joke by sending a marijuana plant to Number 30, resulting in Edie's arrest. Bent on revenge, Edie assists Joe's ex-wife Noeline Mangel (Lindy McConchie) in snatching their son Toby Mangel (Finn Greentree-Keane) from Joe, who he is currently staying with. This move endangers Toby as his violent stepfather, Ted Vickers (John Jacobs) attacks him and Noeline, but Joe saves them in the nick of time. Edie apologises to Joe as she had no idea of Ted's violent nature. Soon after, she leaves Erinsborough to look after a sick relative.

== Sylvie Latham ==
Sylvie Latham
- Neighbours character
- Portrayed by: Christine Harris
- First appearance: 22 September 1988
- Last appearance: 27 September 1988
- Introduced by: Don Battye
In-universe information
- Occupation: Model

Sylvie Latham, played by Christine Harris, made her first appearance on 22 September 1988. Kesta Desmond author of Neighbours Special, commented that Sylvie made a dramatic entrance to the show, as within one episode she had decided to "romantically tackle" Scott Robinson (Jason Donovan). Desmond said Sylvie's method of seduction was "far from subtle!" Of her role, Desmond stated: "It caused quite a stir filming those scenes, but it was a lot of fun." She thought she would get "a lot of flack" from fans of Scott, but she was surprised when she did not receive many complaints.

Sylvie is a model who works for the same agency as Jane Harris (Annie Jones). Scott Robinson interviews Sylvie at Jane's suggestion for his article for the Erinsborough News. Sylvie and Scott have lunch and she is clearly attracted to him. When Sylvie admits that she is attracted to Scott, Jane warns her off and tells her that Scott is married to her friend Charlene Robinson (Kylie Minogue), who is currently in Brisbane. Undeterred, Sylvie steps up her quest to seduce Scott, who rebuffs her advances. Angry with being rejected, Sylvie lies to Jane that Scott spent the night with her at Lassiter's. Scott denies this and he and Jane confront Sylvie, who admits that she did it for attention because she felt like she always had to live in her sister's shadow. She apologises to Scott.

== Skinner ==
Skinner
- Neighbours character
- Portrayed by: Mat Stevenson
- Duration: 1988–1989
- First appearance: 31 October 1988
- Last appearance: 19 April 1989
- Introduced by: Don Battye

Skinner, played by Mat Stevenson, made his first appearance on 31 October 1988. Stevenson found that his role in Neighbours helped him to be more level-headed and get his "act together". Cindy Jones of The Sydney Morning Herald called Skinner a "rough and tumble street kid". When Stevenson went on to join fellow soap opera Home and Away as Adam Cameron, he found it to be "something of a role reversal", saying he went "from a scum to a nice boy." In a 2005 interview with the BBC celebrating 20 years of Neighbours, Stevenson opined that the serial's success was due to its cheerfulness "There's a fair amount of optimism, youthful exuberance and the sunshine that just appeals." He added "It is 15 years since I've been on the show but I still get recognised as Skinner. Last year I was travelling on a train in Melbourne and I signed 40 autographs. It's amazing how revered I am in other walks of life. Being in Neighbours has done me nothing but favours."

Skinner meets Todd Landers (Kristian Schmid) at a local arcade when he runs away from home. When Helen Daniels (Anne Haddy) and Nick Page (Mark Stevens) come looking for Todd, Skinner lies and tells them he saw him at another arcade. He then invites Todd back to his squat and teaches him how to "survive" on the streets by stealing. Skinner gives Todd an ultimatum; either earn his keep or go back onto the streets. Todd reluctantly complies with Skinner's plan to rob a carphone warehouse and sell the phones for a profit. They go to a warehouse but when they spot Helen and Nick they run off. On the night of the robbery, Nick catches up with Skinner and Todd and fights with Skinner but is arrested when the alarm is triggered and Skinner gets away. Skinner warns Todd not to say anything. Feeling guilty, Todd flees while Skinner is asleep and returns home in order to exonerate Nick.

Skinner turns up on Ramsay Street and plans to rob Number 22, forcing Todd to be his accomplice but Todd's sister, Katie (Sally Jensen) catches him in the act and he threatens her. Fearful for his sister's safety, Todd unhooks Paul (Stefan Dennis) and Gail Robinson's (Fiona Corke) VCR. Gail arrives home unexpectedly and rescues Katie and Todd chases after Skinner. A passing Nick helps overpower Skinner and he is arrested. Several months later, Skinner reappears when Nick and his girlfriend Sharon Davies (Jessica Muschamp) hitch a lift back to Erinsborough after running away. He drives off with Sharon causing her to panic but offers to take her back to Erinsborough and she thanks him with a kiss. Skinner and Sharon begin dating much to Nick's horror and everyone tries to warn Sharon about Skinner but she will not listen. The final straw comes when Skinner menaces Sharon's older sister, Bronwyn (Rachel Friend) and attempts to force himself on her, but Sharon catches him in the act. After trying to flee, Skinner is arrested once again.

== Toby Mangel ==
Toby Mangel made his first appearance on 10 November 1988. He was originally played by Finn Greentree-Keane until 1990. Ben Geurens then took over the role when Greentree-Keane decided to leave. Geurens had previously done a stint on Neighbours the year before with the New Generation Stunts company and had doubled for some of the other children. When the producers needed a new actor to play the part of Toby they thought Geurens would be ideal as he already had experience with the show. Geurens remained in the serial until 1993. A writer for the BBC said Toby's most notable moment was "coping with his mother and Kerry's deaths". A columnist for Inside Soap called Toby "the cutest child on Ramsay Street" and said he became a favourite with viewers.

== Mark Granger ==
Mark Granger
- Neighbours character
- Portrayed by: Colin Handley
- Duration: 1988–1989
- First appearance: 23 November 1988
- Last appearance: 9 February 1989
- Introduced by: Don Battye
In-universe information
- Occupation: Businessman
- Father: Mark Granger
- Mother: Mrs Granger
- Grandfathers: Mark Granger

Mark Granger, played by Colin Handley, made his first appearance on 23 November 1988 and departed on 9 February 1989. Handley's role was only for three months, but he was able to use the serial's popularity in the United Kingdom to move over there and make public appearances in character. Handley told a reporter for The Gold Coast Bulletin, "I used to put my own ads in the paper with my photo. It used to say Neighbours star Mark Granger now available for personal appearances'. I put my own phone number, but I used to answer it as my own agent." Handley's fame also allowed him to star in pantomime. In an interview with New Idea, Handley's co-star, Annie Jones, whose character Jane Harris is involved with Mark, admitted that the outcome of their storyline was "a bit of a cliffhanger".

Mark is a rich businessman who meets Jane Harris in the United States. Shortly after she returns to Erinsborough, he arrives to visit her and immediately declares his love for her and buys her some diamond earrings. They go on several dates together and Mark proposes and Jane accepts. They make at the announcement to Jane's friends and neighbours at the Robinson family's Christmas party. Their engagement is met with opposition from Mark's mother, Mrs Granger (Mary Ward), who tells Jane she is not suited to her son due to their class differences. Undeterred, Mark is keen to marry Jane and plans are made, but Jane changes her mind after Rosemary Daniels (Joy Chambers), who has done business with Mark in the past, tells her that she is making a mistake. Jane hands Mark back the engagement ring and he returns to the United States.

== Others ==
Date(s)	Character	Actor	Circumstances
22–26 January	Elinora Romeo	Kate Jason	Tony Romeo's mother. She arrives in Erinsborough when she learns that Tony is getting married. Tony panics and pretends Jane Harris is his fiancée and tries to stall Elinora by lying that Jane has chicken pox. Elinora meets Jane for herself and to keep the story going, Jane tells her she was misdiagnosed. More lies occur when Tony tells Elinora his flatmate Sally Wells is Jane's sister. Elinora quickly works out this is a ruse and discovers the wedding is a lie for Tony to get out of an arranged marriage. She then backs off after realizing Tony must choose his own wife and leaves for Perth.
11–25 February	Mr Phillips	Earl Francis	Tony Romeo and Sally Wells' landlord. When Sally complains about the condition of the flat, he agrees to have improvements done and mentions there will be a slight rent increase, much to Tony's chagrin. The following week, Phillips visits when Helen Daniels moves into one of his flats. Helen's guest, Hilary Robinson mentions that there may be a ghost in the flats but Phillips dismisses this and mentions Mary Barrett, the previous tenant, had disappeared without a trace, prompting Hilary to worry. When Nell Mangel hears something coming from Helen's chimney she too, is convinced there is a spirit and is frightened. Tony discovers that a stray cat named Satan was stuck in the chimney. Phillips returns and thinks that Satan is waiting for Mary to return. He agrees to take the cat home with him and brick up the chimney.
15 February	Christine Matthews	Helen Milte	The celebrant who conducts the wedding of Jim Robinson and Beverly Marshall at Number 26 Ramsay Street on Valentine's Day. She also officiates the vow renewal of Jim's son Paul and his wife Gail shortly after.
18 February	Barry Hawkins	James Patrick	A used car dealer who shows interest in Madge Ramsay's car and cons her into selling for significantly less than the asking price.
1–3 March	Graeme Clifford	John Lee	Graeme arrives in Erinsborough on business from London en route to Brisbane and immediately makes friends with Madge Ramsay. Madge's fiancé Harold Bishop is jealous. A few days later, Graeme reappears and Madge is stunned to see him back from Brisbane so fast, He explains he never went and remained in Erinsborough all weekend. When Madge thanks him for a letter he supposedly sent, Graeme says he didn't write it. Graeme's wife, June arrives and he explains that he received a telegram from her stating she would be in Erinsborough. The Cliffords then leave for Brisbane, leaving Madge embarrassed.
16–25 March	Frank Darcy	Wyn Roberts	An artist friend of Helen Daniels, who arrives in Erinsborough to stay with her ahead of his big art exhibition. Frank is arrested after assaulting a local because he was stressed. Helen pays his bail and he is given a caution. There is an attraction between the two and Frank asks Helen to return to the outback with him, but she declines as she feels she is unable to leave Erinsborough due to her family and friends. Frank leaves alone, but they keep in contact for several years. In 2005, in a poll produced by the BBC asking for the "20 Most Obscure Neighbours characters", Frank made the list at Number 13.
25 March–2 May	Ted Regan	Julian Branagan	A friend of Dave Summers. He and Summers are responsible for running Daphne Clarke and Gail Robinson off the road, resulting in Daphne's death. Several Ramsay Street residents tackle them when their car is recognised and the case goes to trial. Regan threatens Gail on the day of the trial and her husband Paul warns him off. Summers loses his license for a year and is given a $500 fine while Regan escapes punishment. He goads Mike Young into hitting him after he tells him that he and Summers framed Mike for assault but Daphne's widower Des Clarke stops any altercation and tells Regan, that his son Jamie will grow up without a mother thanks to him and Summers. Regan testifies for the prosecution at Mike's trial and Mike is found guilty of assault.
7–19 April	Geoff Garrett	Mark Pennell	Geoff works for Jim Robinson and Ross Warner. Ross fires Geoff and he tells Jim's son, Scott about Ross' crooked practices and bribery to other companies. Scott does some further investigation and presses Geoff to tell Jim about Ross' dealings, but Geoff folds when Scott and Jim arrive at his house with Ross, and denies everything and drives away.
13 April 1988, 5 September 1989, 25 November 1991 – 24 February 1992	Arthur Bright	George Dixon; Barry Hill	A local undertaker who visits Nell Mangel. She initially mistakes him for a kennel salesman and is horrified when he reveals his occupation. Arthur hires Henry Ramsay to work for his funeral parlour and is irate when Henry locks a coffin in the hearse ahead of a funeral and promptly fires him. Several years later, Arthur reappears when his teenage daughter Phoebe Bright begins dating Josh Anderson. He warns Josh off Phoebe and becomes more and more possessive of his daughter. Josh, undeterred confronts Arthur and Arthur suffers a heart attack and remains in hospital for several weeks. He later dies following surgery.
19 May–23 November	Mrs McCrae	Reylene Pearce	Mrs McCrae applies for the position of nanny to Des Clarke's son, Jamie, but is unsuccessful due to her stern demeanour. She later applies at Lassiter's for the vacant position of housekeeper and remarks that Gail Robinson is a little young to be in charge of the complex.
19–20 May	Carol Barker	Louise Siversen	Carol answers Des Clarke's advert for a nanny to his son Jamie. Carol is a nurse but wants the freedom that the lifestyle of a nanny offers and Des agrees to hire her on the spot. When Jamie cries loudly for his lunch, Carol lets him cry. Des' neighbour Gail Robinson is concerned but Carol reassures her everything is fine and refuses to let her see Jamie. When Des arrives home, he notices Jamie is cranky and Gail tells him about Carol. The following day, the same thing happens and Des feeds Jamie himself. Carol then tells Des that Jamie will end up spoiled. Des then promptly tells Carol, to leave which she does.
24 May 1988, 1 November 1993, 7 March 1994	Prue Watkins	Lindsay Worthington; Jacyl Shaw; Olivia Davis	A receptionist at Lassiter's. Her colleague Jane Harris and Mike Young set her up on a date with David Bishop. David asks Prue out on a second date but she rejects him. Prue reappears sparingly over the next few years.
2–30 June	Steve Fisher	Michael Pope	Charlene Robinson's driving instructor, they become friendly while Charlene is in Brisbane visiting her grandparents Dan and Edna Ramsay. Charlene's husband Scott is jealous, but she reassures him nothing is going on. When Charlene passes her test, she and Steve share a kiss and Charlene is wracked with guilt and confesses to Scott. Charlene's brother Henry Ramsay warns Steve to keep away, but he is undeterred. Steve then offers Charlene a choice, him or Scott and she chooses her husband. Steve then returns to Brisbane.
17 June–8 July	Ian Chadwick	Robin Bowering	Gail Robinson's biological father. He reappears when Gail tracks him down and they begin to build up a relationship but Gail's adoptive father, Rob Lewis is jealous and tries to sabotage Ian's attempts to get to closer to Gail. The final straw comes when Rob breaks a present Ian buys for Gail and her husband Paul's first wedding anniversary and refuses to apologize. Gail is angry at first but Rob calms down and apologizes and gives Ian his blessing to remain in contact with Gail.
17–28 June	Rachel Frazer	Pamela Hawkesford	A basketball player who meets Scott Robinson, Mike Young and Pete Baxter when they visit the Australian Institute of Sport in Canberra when Pete is awarded a place there and is assigned Rachel as a mentor. There is an attraction between Mike and Rachel and they begin dating, but Rachel makes it clear basketball is priority. When Pete injures himself and has to see a doctor, he blames Scott but Rachel admits she was the one who informed Pete's trainers about Pete's injury. When the guys leave the institute to return to Erinsborough, Pete thanks Rachel for her all her help. Rachel then tells Mike he needs to get over his ex-girlfriend Jane Harris. Several weeks later, When Pete disappears from the institute and turns up in Erinsborough and says he could no longer handle it there, Rachel calls Mike to tell him the truth behind Pete's disappearance from the institute, which forces Pete to come clean and admit that he has exacerbated his injury.
21–22 July	Carl Banks	Don Bridges	A kitchen hand at Lassiter's. Nell Mangel is suspicious of him, despite Carl being highly praised by management. Nell tells Paul Robinson that Carl has been stealing from the kitchen. Carl protests his innocence but when Paul opens up a bag, he finds various items of food from the kitchen and Carl is subsequently arrested and charged. However, Carl is released due to lack of a criminal record. He then forces his way into Number 32, blaming Nell for costing him his job and threatens to harm her and make it look like an accident. Bronwyn Davies arrives home and witnesses the situation and grabs an umbrella and is able to chase Carl out of the house.
11–12 August	Bob Hughes	Jim Daly	Bob is a regular customer at the Waterhole pub who makes sarcastic comments about the new uniforms the bar staff have been told to wear. When Bob begins making drunken lecherous comments to Madge Bishop, her son, Henry Ramsay pushes Bob and he falls over. Bob then sues for damages. Madge tries to talk him out of it but he is adamant, which results in Derek Morris firing both Henry and Madge. However, When he gets his medical report back, Bob calls off the suit.
19 August	Gary Ling	Lee Chong	A Year 8 classmate of Todd Landers. He enters an ice-cream eating contest at the coffee shop along with Todd and several others, but the event quickly turns into a food fight, resulting in Des Clarke disqualifying all contestants.
26 August 1988 – 31 January 1989	Penelope Porter	Nikki Wendt	A new assistant manager at the Erinsborough branch of the Pacific Bank. She and colleague Des Clarke become very friendly and there is an attraction, but Des is reluctant to take things further as his wife Daphne has recently died. Dejected, Penny then transfers back to head office. She reappears when Des has an allergy and replaces him at the bank. She admits she has been seeing their boss Gordon Hemmings for a while but after spending the evening with Des, they share a kiss. Des plans to propose after it seems like Penny and Gordon will break up but Penny announces she and Gordon are leaving for Europe, breaking Des' heart.
26–29 August 1998, 7 April 1993, 27 September 1994	Mr Varney	Ian Sprake	An auctioneer who handles the sale of Number 30 Ramsay Street. Sharon Davies, in order to put her aunt Edith Chubb off buying the house disguises herself as an old lady and successfully wins the auction, however, Des Clarke exposes Sharon's deception and unmasks her. Varney is annoyed and tells Sharon off for wasting everyone's time. However, the proxy bid Des made on Edie's behalf is accepted. A few years later, Varney auctions off a property Brad Willis unsuccessfully bids for. In September 1994, Varney handles the auction of Number 28 which Karl Kennedy and Colin Taylor compete for. Karl places the winning bid for $250,000.
29 August	Margaret Brownley	Maggie Seren	A patient of Beverly Marshall, who suffers an Asthma attack one day in the coffee shop. Beverly acts quickly but Margaret dies en route to hospital. Worse news is to come when the cause of Margaret's death is an overdose as a result of Beverly administering a shot when Margaret had been taking medication orally.
2–5 September	Brad Fuller	Scott Snibson	University friends of Mike Young, who arrive for a study session with Mike at Number 28. While Brad gets along with Mike's girlfriend, Bronwyn Davies, who also works as a live-in nanny, Jackie clashes with Bronwyn by putting down her occupation and making rude comments when she learns Bronwyn did not receive her HSC after dropping out of school to help family on the farm after her mother's death. Several weeks later, at a fete for the local church, Jackie continues putting Bronwyn down and receives a cream pie in the face for her trouble. After Bronwyn refuses to apologize, Jackie storms off.
2 September–5 October	Jackie Vidor	Shona Ford	
9 September 1988 – 6 June 1989	Bruce Zadro	Myles Collins	Nick Page's nemesis at Erinsborough High. He causes trouble at the school dance by making unwanted advances towards Nick's date Sharon Davies and he and Nick get into a fight, resulting in Nick receiving a black eye ahead of his court date for graffiti. Zadro later frames Nick for tagging principal Kenneth Muir's car, which sees him expelled as a result. Sharon, eager to avenge Nick, concocts a scheme to get Zadro to reveal himself as the true culprit by pretending to flirt with him and tricks him into confessing over the school tannoy and Nick is reinstated while Zadro is expelled. Nick and Zadro later enter a skateboarding competition where the stipulation is if Zadro wins, he gets a date with Sharon. However, Nick injures himself during practice and Matt Williams agrees to compete in his place and beats Zadro.
12 September	Andrew Brownley	Ian Murton	Margaret Brownley's son. Following Margaret's death, Andrew blames Beverly Marshall, who attended to Margaret and threatens to sue for Malpractice. Beverly's husband, Jim Robinson tries to reason with him but Andrew is unrepentant and takes the suit to court. However, Beverly is found not to be at fault.
20 September 1988 – 17 February 1989	Vanessa Bailey	Gretchen Zoland	A classmate of Sharon Davies and Nick Page. She and her friend Pam Muir offer Sharon a cigarette while she is working at the Coffee Shop. Sharon is reluctant but Vanessa and Pam begin taunting her. Sharon takes a puff and dislikes it then throws the cigarette away into a bin, which causes a huge fire. Several months later, Vanessa suggests that Nick asks Mr Muir if he can paint a mural on a blank wall at the school. However, Nick's plans are cut short when Muir's car is graffitied and he is blamed for it.
12 October–4 November	Jessie Ross	Michelle Kearley	A Year 10 student, who attends a party thrown by classmate Sharon Davies. She is attracted to Mike Young who is due to start at his alma mater Erinsborough High as their teacher. When Jessie arrives with a bruised face to a study session, it causes concern. Mike discovers Jessie's mother Adele is the one hitting her after suspecting her father Ted. When Mike and Jessie have a tutoring session one day after school, their emotions get the best of them and they share a kiss only to be caught by principal Kenneth Muir, who angrily suspends Mike. Jessie is then sent to live with her grandparents and tells Mike she loves him before leaving.
20–24 October	Charles Spencer	Michael Brophy	Charles is a friend of John Worthington who attended the same Dental College. He arrives ahead of John's wedding to Nell Mangel to serve as his best man and attends John's bucks party.
21 October–4 November	Ted Ross	Doug Bennett	The father of Jessie Ross. Jessie's teacher Mike Young suspects Ted of beating her when she begins attending school bruised and becomes cagey about the subject of her parents. Mike arrives at the house one day to find that Ted is not the culprit but his wife Adele. After a talk, Mike gives the Rosses a number to call to get some professional help and Ted is grateful. However, after Mike is caught in a compromising position with Jessie, he is livid and makes a threat that Mike will never teach in any other school.
25–26 October	Adele Ross	Marian Sinclair	The mother of Jessie Ross. Jessie's teacher, Mike Young arrives at their house and learns that Adele is responsible for Jessie's bruises after overhearing shouting. Mike confronts Adele and she threatens to call police if he does not leave but he calls her bluff by saying the police may be interested in learning the full extent of Jessie's bruises. Adele's husband, Ted arrives home and they discuss matters with Mike and after a long discussion, Mike puts the Rosses in touch with a counsellor.
7–17 November	Leanne Sterling	May Lloyd	Malcolm Clarke's girlfriend. There is a big age difference between the two and Malcolm is eager to impress Leanne so he lies that he is wealthy and his son Des' house belongs to him and Des lives there. Malcolm introduces Leanne to his family and leaves her to get acquainted with Des. She begins flirting with Des and making unwanted advances towards him, making him uncomfortable. When she tries to kiss Des and he rejects her, Malcolm walks in and witnesses this and Leanne invents a story that Des made a pass at her after slapping him. Malcolm initially believes Leanne, but Des snaps and urges them to be honest with each other. Leanne then leaves.
10 November 1988 – 20 February 1990	Noeline Mangel	Lindy McConchie	Joe Mangel's ex-wife. She brings their son Toby to live with Joe while she marries her new partner, Ted Vickers. Noeline returns after Christmas to collect Toby along with Ted but Toby is reluctant to go as Ted has a temper. When Ted hits Toby for making a mess during dinner, Joe threatens Ted and throws both him and Noeline out. In desperation, Noeline turns to Edith Chubb, who has a grudge against Joe, for help. While Joe is out, Noeline snatches Toby back and returns home only to find Ted does not want Toby living with them and goes to hit her but Joe overpowers him and rescues Toby and Noeline. Toby tries to reunite Joe and Noeline but fails, much to his disappointment. Noeline later receives a job in Darwin and wants Toby to join her, and after some reluctance and some arguing between Joe and Noeline, Toby agrees to live with Noeline and they leave. However, two months later, Noeline is killed in a road accident and Toby returns to Joe.
30 November	Eva Lindstrom	Lana Darby	A Scandinavian masseuse who tends to Harold Bishop when he has a back spasm. She visits him at his home and administers treatment, which is successful.
