= Mike Young (Neighbours) =

Fictional character from the Australian soap opera Neighbours

- Neighbours character
- Mike in 1986
- Portrayed by: Guy Pearce
- Duration: 1986–1989, 2022–2024
- First appearance: 20 January 1986
- Last appearance: 15 July 2024
- Created by: Ray Kolle
- Introduced by: Reg Watson (1986); Jason Herbison (2022)
In-universe information
- Occupation: Student; Waiter; Maths teacher; Motorcycle tour guide
- Father: David Young
- Mother: Barbara Young
- Wife: Rose (divorced)
- Daughters: Sam Young

Mike Young is a fictional character from the Australian television soap opera Neighbours, played by Guy Pearce. Pearce was in his final year at school and only had amateur theatre experience when he auditioned for the role. After winning the part of Mike, Pearce soon relocated to Melbourne and began filming in December 1985. He made his first appearance during the episode broadcast on 20 January 1986. Mike's arrival was part of an attempt to give the serial a youthful look. He was given immediate links to the other character through a friendship with Scott Robinson (Jason Donovan), who helps him secure work at the local coffee shop.

Mike is portrayed as an ambitious, hardworking, responsible, well adjusted young man. However, Mike and his mother Barbara (Rona McLeod; Diana Greentree) are physically abused by his father David Young (Stewart Faichney). The storyline led to Pearce receiving hundreds of letters from children, who confided in him about their own abusive parents. Eventually, Mike is taken in by Daphne Lawrence (Elaine Smith) and her partner Des Clarke (Paul Keane), who later become his guardians. Mike has a long-running romance with Jane Harris (Annie Jones), and they form a popular friendship group with Scott and Charlene Mitchell (Kylie Minogue). The relationship does not last and Jane later becomes engaged to Des, while Mike dates Bronwyn Davies (Rachel Friend). Jones later stated that Mike was the love of Jane's life. Mike pursues a teaching career and returns to his high school for a student placement, where he almost gets himself fired for kissing a student.

Mike temporarily leaves Erinsborough to tour in a band in late 1988. The storyline was a cover for Pearce, who took a break to shoot a feature film. On his return, Mike reveals that he was in a motorbike accident with Jenny Owens (Danielle Carter). Mike feels immense guilt that she has been paralyzed after he tried to show her a trick. Pearce decided not to renew his contract upon its expiration in October 1989, as he wanted to pursue more challenging roles. Mike's exit storyline saw him leave Erinsborough to be with his sick mother on 6 December 1989. Pearce reprised the role for the show's finale on 28 July 2022, as Mike returns to Erinsborough with his daughter, and made further intermittent appearances since the series returned on 18 September 2023, before departing the show for good on 15 July 2024.

== Casting ==
Guy Pearce was in his final year at Geelong College and appearing in amateur theatre when he "bombarded" the Grundy Organisation with tapes of his performances. He then attended a general audition at Grundys, where he auditioned for Neighbours casting director Jan Russ. He was cast as teenager Mike Young, who became one of several characters introduced in 1986 to give the show "a more youthful look". Two days after finishing his HSC exams, Pearce relocated from Geelong to Melbourne. He started work at Neighbours on 2 December 1985. Mike was his first professional acting role. Pearce was critical of his early performances, saying "I was really awful because I didn't know what I was doing." He admitted that for the first two and a half years, he "was running behind the eight-ball" as he filmed two and a half hours worth of episodes a week, but he eventually settled into his acting and the character began to come naturally to him. Pearce later stated that being cast as Mike was "a fantastic break for an 18-year-old". He said "I'd been doing amateur theatre in Geelong and suddenly I was in a national television show." Pearce made his debut as Mike on 20 January 1986, which was the first episode broadcast on Network Ten following the show's move from Seven Network.

== Development ==
=== Characterisation and introduction ===
Mike is introduced as a school friend of Scott Robinson (Jason Donovan). His official character's biography states that he is "a thoroughly nice young man. Scott Robinson recommends him for the job at the coffee shop which he does outside school hours. He is ambitious and hardworking, and often studies in the coffee shop." He is also characterised as "a nice well adjusted young guy with a bright future." Unbeknown to his friends, Mike and his mother Barbara (Rona McLeod; Diana Greentree) are physically abused by his father David Young (Stewart Faichney). This motivates Mike to take the job at the coffee shop, as he wants to earn enough money to get himself and his mother away from David. His boss Daphne Lawrence (Elaine Smith) finds out about his situation and tries to help persuade Barbara to leave her husband, so she and Mike can start afresh, but Barbara is so afraid of David that she cannot make the break. Daphne later suggests that Mike comes to live with her and her partner Des Clarke (Paul Keane), who become his guardians. The storyline led to Pearce receiving hundreds of letters from children, who confided in him, as Mike, about their own experiences with abusive parents. He told Lou Anson of Aberdeen Press and Journal that some of them asked him to become their pen-pal, but he was only able to write back advising them to seek help. He also told Anson that until he joined Neighbours, he had no idea "such terrible things happened."

Neil Wallis and Dave Hogan of The Neighbours Factfile noted that the child abuse "still haunts" Mike, who is later abandoned by his mother when she moves overseas following the death of his father. As he settles into Ramsay Street, Mike dates Nikki Dennison (Charlene Fenn). The Guardian's Patrick Barkham described him at this time as "the slightly square boy next door" and a "nice-but-lonely orphan". Mike and Scott are the victims of "a cruel practical joke" by Sue Parker (Kate Gorman), who learns that they have written a pop song and sent it to a producer. Sue poses as Molly Meldrum's secretary and invites them to come and sing the song in front of Molly. Scott and Mike re-record the song and tell all their friends at school. When they turn up at Molly's house, they soon learn the appointment is a hoax and Sue publicly gloats about what happened. In March 1988, Pearce spoke to Eithne Power of the Radio Times about upcoming storylines for his character and stated "Mike will have developed a bit more by then. He certainly needs to. Though he's a good, responsible guy he goes really fuddy-duddy when it comes to girls. He can handle his work and his study and his friendships, but with girls he's a real twit. I'm all for that, it makes him more believable, rounds him out. Who needs someone who's got nothing left to learn?"

=== Relationship with Jane Harris ===
One of the character's most notable storylines was his relationship with Jane Harris (Annie Jones). Jane was introduced a few months after Mike and they formed a friendship group with Scott and Charlene Mitchell (Kylie Minogue), which became popular with viewers and the media. Author Josephine Monroe said that until Jane's arrival, Mike often felt like "a bit of a gooseberry" when he was with Scott and Charlene. Jane took "an instant shine" to Mike, but believed that he had not noticed her as she wore big glasses and was "a geeky brainbox". However, Mike soon began paying her attention, despite receiving jibes from his school friends. One of the serial's most memorable plots occurred when Mike asked Jane to the school dance and she received a makeover from Daphne and Helen Daniels (Anne Haddy), which left him proud to escort his girlfriend to the dance. The relationship initially faces opposition from Jane's grandmother Nell Mangel (Vivean Gray), and is tested by the return of Nikki, who tries to come between the couple, and Mike's jealously when he realises Shane Ramsay (Peter O'Brien) likes Jane, after they become lost in the bush together. Monroe noted that Mike and Jane were good for each other, but they never seemed "madly in love" like Scott and Charlene, whose wedding they attended as best man and bridesmaid respectively. Mike's interest in photography led to a modelling opportunity for Jane, after he took a photo of her that was selected to be the poster for the first Lassiters Girl.

The relationship ends when Mike goes off to university and later meets Megan Downey (Michelle O'Grady), who tries to get him to move in with her. Mike has "a change of heart" and then begins trying to win Jane back. Pearce told Patrice Fidgeon from TV Week: "He's been wooing her, sending her flowers and finally she gives in. I think she feels sorry for him and eventually realises she really does like him." The former couple were not on good terms prior to working together taking test shots for a modelling campaign with Scott's help. After Scott decides to swim back to the shore after they become stranded at sea, Mike and Jane have a chance to resolve their past issues and Jane re-evaluates her feelings for Mike. Fidgeon observed that it is clear both Mike and Jane care deeply for one another. Pearce told him that up to that point, their relationship had been "a fairly platonic one". Jane is also dating pilot Glen Matheson (Richard Moss), who is much older than her, but she realises their relationship is not going to work and ends it. Mrs Mangel, who was not initially in favour of Mike dating her granddaughter, changes her mind about him following Jane's involvement with Glen. Fidgeon speculated that Mike and Jane might follow in Scott and Charlene's footsteps and marry. Pearce refused to say how the relationship worked out, but was pleased with the direction his character was taking.

Jane and Mike's relationship does not last, and she is later paired with Des. While preparing for Mike's birthday, Des helps Mike set up his own photography dark room. Jane also offers to help out, but she receives a big electric shock and Des saves her. A romance soon develops between them, and Jones commented that "it builds towards a full on affair." This results in end of her relationship with Mike, with Jones adding "Mike gets the flick, basically." Producers then paired Mike with Bronwyn Davies (Rachel Friend) for a brief romance storyline. Friend admitted to being scared in her "first encounter" with Pearce, but after kissing him she realised that while she was self-conscious, nobody took any notice. Bronwyn soon chooses Henry Ramsay (Craig McLachlan) over Mike. Mike later believes he and Jane have a chance of reconciling, but learns she is in love with Des. When Jane is almost hit by a car, this makes Des realise how much he loves Jane and asks her to marry him. While everyone is pleased for the couple, Mike is upset when he hears the news, as he realises that both of the women in his life have chosen other men over him. While reflecting on her character's relationships in June 2022, Jones believed Mike was the love of Jane's life. She said Jane was heartbroken when he broke up with her, adding "There will always be a hole in her heart for Mike."

=== Later storylines ===
Mike pursues a career as a school teacher at university and he returns to Erinsborough High on a student placement. While there, Mike privately tutors 16 year old Jessie Ross (Michelle Kearley) and learns that she is being abused by her mother Adele Ross (Marian Sinclair). McCready and Furlong of Neighbours The Official Annual 1991 pointed out the story was ironic as Mike had also been the victim of paternal abuse. Mike is angered when Jessie's father Ted Ross (Doug Bennett) learns what is happening and appears to be more concerned about his business reputation, rather than his daughter. McCready and Furlong stated "Even though he is only young, Mike has had enough experience to be able to deal with such dramatic incidents in a sensible way." Mike later shares a kiss with Jessie in an empty classroom, but they are caught by principal Kenneth Muir (Roger Boyce) and he decides to take some time away.

Pearce took a two month break from Neighbours in late 1988 to film a role in Heaven Tonight. He confirmed that he was not leaving the show and had in fact signed for another year. He was grateful to Grundys for letting him go and writing him out of the scripts. On-screen, Mike temporarily departs Erinsborough to tour with a jazz band. Portraying Mike as a jazz musician came easy to Pearce, as he is a musician himself and enjoys playing and writing rock songs. Upon his return, he is moody and becomes hostile towards Henry, who has moved into his home and is staying in Bronwyn's room. Mike later punches Henry. The cause of Mike's bad mood is later revealed. Off-screen, he had met Jenny Owens (Danielle Carter), who seemed to share his sense of adventure. Mike initially keeps their relationship a secret from his friends and their story is told through a dream sequence. Pearce told Darren Devlyn of TV Week: "They zip around from town to town on Mike's motorbike... it's a bit thrill for them." However, Mike "flirts with danger" and forgets his sense of responsibility when he goes to show Jenny a trick. Jenny loses her grip when Mike accelerates and she falls from the bike. Her spine takes the brunt of the fall and she becomes a paraplegic, who has to use a wheelchair. Carter joined the cast for six weeks, as Mike spends time with Jenny at a convalescence home. His feelings of guilt lead him to try and make her life more comfortable, and they eventually grow closer.

=== Departure ===
In June 1989, David Brown and Patrice Fidgeon of TV Week reported that Pearce was set to quit Neighbours, along with Jones. They reported that the pressure was on Pearce and Jones to stay following the departures of Minogue and Donovan, but Pearce wanted to prioritise his film and music careers. Brown and Fidgeon also reported that Network Ten wanted to keep the departures "under wraps" to minimise negative publicity in the lead up to the show's 1000th episode. Pearce decided not to renew his contract when it ran out in October that year. Pearce said Neighbours had opened a lot of doors for him, but he wanted more of a challenge. He explained "I've been doing Neighbours now for some three and a half years and when I stepped away for two months to do Heaven Tonight it was like I had to remember how to act again. You've always had to act in Neighbours, but you fall into a routine. I didn't have to think about what Mike does anymore, I just naturally do it." Pearce had thought about leaving the show for around a year, and after starring in Heaven Tonight he realised that he wanted to continue making feature films. He also felt that playing Mike had become stale and he had achieved everything he could from the role, stating "I've been incredibly lucky. It's been a really good launching pad and the best thing for me was that it was the first professional job I'd ever done on television, so I learned a great deal about working with cameras and direction." On-screen, Des informs Mike that his mother has been injured in a plane crash and urges him to visit her. Marion MacDonald of The Sydney Morning Herald observed that Mike showed "an unfilial reluctance" to fly out to Barbara, as she had been a bad parent. However, Mike eventually decides to leave Erinsborough to reconcile with her. His exit aired in December 1989.

=== Return ===
Mike as he appeared in 2023, in scenes filmed with Annie Jones in the UK.

When Neighbours was cancelled, Pearce discussed a hypothetical return with Donovan. In March 2022, producers approached Pearce with the invitation to reprise the role for few episodes in June that year. Pearce informed Donovan, who himself would soon reprise his famous role.

On 3 June 2022, Duncan Lindsay of the Metro confirmed Pearce would be reprising his role for the Neighbours finale, following its cancellation earlier in the year. He appears in the final three episodes, which air back-to-back on 28 July 2022. Of his return, Pearce stated "It is very exciting and surreal at the same time being back on set again, however it feels like coming home. It's where it all started for me professionally. I've been asked to come back on occasions over the years and wondered if it was the right thing to do, but once I knew the show was finishing, I knew I had to do it."

Executive producer Jason Herbison said Pearce was returning for "a very special story arc" and that he had been involved in the development of the storyline, which will answer the question "who is Mike Young today?" Pearce later told Angela Bishop of Studio 10 that Mike's return sees him and his daughter relocate from Perth to Erinsborough. Henrietta Graham, a family friend of Pearce, had recently joined the Neighbours cast as Sam, a hotel employee; Pearce requested to work with her and suggested that Sam become Mike's daughter.

Pearce also revealed that his friend and fellow actor Kate Winslet was a fan of the show and his character, so he and the producers considered naming the mother of Mike's daughter after her. However, Pearce felt that was "a little personal" to him, as his former wife is called Kate, so they named her Rose, after Winslet's character in Titanic.

In May 2023, following the series' return to production, Pearce indicated that he was in discussions to make a further appearance in order to provide closure to Mike's relationship with Jane. His return was confirmed on Neighbours' social media accounts shortly after. Pearce's scenes were filmed in the UK ahead of the regular series production recommencing. In January 2024, executive producer Jason Herbison stated that Pearce would continue to make occasional appearances. On-screen Mike remains absent from Ramsay Street after taking up work as a tour guide in the UK, and appears occasionally in video calls to Jane. Herbison described the ongoing situation as a "wonderful dilemma" for the production, and was open to the possibility of Mike appearing in person again if Pearce's scheduled allowed.

In July 2024, Jane and Mike decide to end their long distance relationship. Mike last appeared on 15 July.

== Storylines ==
=== 1986–1989 ===
Mike and his mother, Barbara, live in fear of being beaten by Mike's father, David. Mike befriends Scott Robinson at Erinsborough High School. Through Scott, Mike secures a job at Daphne Lawrence's coffee shop. He begins staying overnight to avoid going home and Daphne's friend Zoe Davis (Ally Fowler) finds his sleeping bag. She also notices bruises on Mike's face and asks whether his father beats him. He later confides in her about how his father was having problems at work and started hitting him around a year ago. He also says that he is saving money so he and his mother can move away. Zoe soon tells Daphne about Mike's father. Mike eventually goes home, but his father soon turns violent and Mike stands up to him. He later turns up at the coffee shop and tells Daphne that he thinks he has killed his father, as he hit his head when Mike pushed him. Daphne calls Barbara and learns David is okay. She tells them that Mike will be staying with her, and has Clive Gibbons (Geoff Paine) look at Mike's facial injuries. Mike refuses to go back home with his parents and Barbara brings him his belongings.

Mike later moves in with Daphne and her partner Des Clarke, who offer to become his legal guardians. He briefly dates Scott's cousin Nikki Dennison, but he later falls for Jane Harris when she moves in with her grandmother, Nell Mangel. Jane falls for Mike straight away, but it takes a while before Mike realises his feelings due to Jane's plain image. Helen Daniels and Daphne give her a makeover for a school dance, which consists of replacing her glasses with contacts, a new haircut and makeup. Mike likes her new image and they begin dating. Mrs Mangel is not happy that her granddaughter is dating Mike and when she receives letters about Mike's reputation with other girls, Mrs Mangel stops Jane from seeing him. Daphne eventually catches school bully, Sue Parker, posting the letters and Sue explains that she is jealous of Mike and Jane's relationship. Mrs Mangel then lets Jane and Mike continue dating. When Nikki returns to Ramsay Street, Mike helps comfort her when she discovers her mother is ill, leading Jane to become jealous of their friendship. Mike becomes jealous when Shane Ramsay shows an attraction to Jane, but she tells Mike that he is the only one for her.

Following their final exams, Jane focuses on her modelling career and Mike decides to become a teacher. As they are leading separate lives, Jane and Mike split up amicably and remain friends. Not long after, Daphne is killed in a car crash and Mike is left feeling guilty as he had not been around for a few weeks. Mike is angry and upset and he finds the two men who had crashed into Daphne's car. He attacks them and is later arrested. When Mike finishes university, he gets a job teaching maths at Erinsborough High. Mike becomes close to one of his students, Jessie Ross, who admits that she has an abusive father too. Mike confronts her father, but soon learns that her mother is the one abusing her. Mike becomes close to Jessie and they share a kiss, which is witnessed by principal Kenneth Muir. Mr Muir suspends Mike, who decides to leave Erinsborough for a while.

On his return, Mike finds Des and Jane have forged a strong friendship. Mike becomes moody as he settles back in. When Jenny Owens comes to see him, it is revealed that Mike and Jenny took a ride on his motorbike and she fell off. Jenny is paralysed and uses a wheelchair. Mike blames himself for Jenny's condition and cannot bring himself to accept that the event was an accident. Jenny eventually convinces him that it was not his fault. At the same time, Des and Jane begin dating and Mike is disgusted with the both of them. He refuses to accept the relationship and leaves Erinsborough again. He returns in the middle of Des and Jane's engagement party and he interrupts it. Mike eventually accepts that Des and Jane love each other and gives them his blessing. Mike begins to feel like there is not much left for him in Erinsborough and when he hears that his mother had been in a plane crash, and with his father long dead, Mike decides to leave Ramsay Street and join her to help her recovery. Years later, when Jane returns to Erinsborough, she reveals that Mike is teaching underprivileged children in the Philippines.

=== 2022–2024 ===
Thirty-three years later, Mike drives his motorbike through Ramsay Street and sees Jane in her driveway and unwittingly interrupts Clive trying to win her back. Mike leaves and goes to Lassiters, where Shane recognises him. Mike goes to see his daughter, Sam Young (Henrietta Graham), who works at the hotel and sees Paul again. Mike bumps into Jane, who drops all her belongings on the floor, and the two are stunned to see each other once again. Mike has drinks with his old friends and waves goodbye to Jane when she leaves. Clive approaches Mike and asks if he is interested in another relationship with Jane, as Clive is trying to restart his with her. Mike says he is not and Jane gives him a tour of all the houses on Ramsay Street. A drunken Clive sees them together and speaks aggressively towards Mike. The two have a fight, but once the alcohol has worn off Clive, he accepts that his and Jane's relationship is over. Mike takes Jane on a ride on his motorbike. He later tells Jane that he still loves her and they hug, rekindling their relationship. Mike and Jane are reunited with Scott and Charlene when they return and the four of them watch over Ramsay Street as its residents party.

Two years after moving back to Ramsay Street, Mike and Jane plan a trip to London, with Mike heading there before Jane as they are unable to get airfares together. Mike plans to propose to Jane, but these plans are derailed by news of the possible closure of Erinsborough High, where Jane works. Mike throws his ring into the lake, but realises that he made a rushed decision to put off the proposal. He retrieves the ring and proposes to Jane, and she accepts. Jane returns to Australia early due to the situation at the school and later gets a call from Mike, who tells her that he has been offered a job in the UK as a motorcycle tour guide. Jane tells him to accept it and he announces that he will be working on a four-month contract. Mike later encourages Jane to cancel her plans to visit him for Christmas due to another work crisis, and a few months later she convinces him to accept a further three months of work. Mike ultimately develops feelings for his boss, and Jane also grows to feel their relationship is not working, so they agree to separate. Mike also speaks to Sam and affirms that she can remain living with Jane if she chooses.

== Reception ==
Critics often remarked on the character's good looks and nice personality. Mike was named "Ramsay Street's favourite boy next door" by Rob Scully of the Aberdeen Evening Express. He also called Mike "wholesome", while the Daily Mirror's Hilary Bonner called him "nice" and a "fresh-face heart throb". David Astle of The Sydney Morning Herald dubbed the character "a mullet-mopped kid" and a "hunky young teacher." A writer for Sunday Life observed that Mike was introduced to the show as "a troubled teenager beaten up by his father."

A writer for the BBC's Neighbours website stated that Mike's most notable moment was when he saw Jane's "transformation at the school dance." In 2010, to celebrate Neighbours' 25th anniversary Sky, a British satellite broadcasting company, included Mike in their 25 most memorable characters in the show's history. Describing him they state: "The Erinsborough economy is studied the world over for being the only one in the world that can sustained on just four professions: you can work in 'business', or be a journalist, a doctor, or a teacher. Mike chose the latter, probably because he was the nice, fairly quiet boy out of the legendary original set of teens on the show. His romance with plain Jane Harris unfortunately ended up with her engaged to his father figure of a friend, Des, one of many reasons why he left the show to care for his sick mother." Robin Wilks from The Daily Telegraph included Pearce at number three in his feature on the "Top five ex-Neighbours stars", following his successful acting career. While discussing his time on the show, Wilks thought there was a lot of "unresolved sexual tension" between Mike and Lucy Robinson.

Lorna Cooper of MSN TV has listed Mike as one of soap opera's forgotten characters and claimed he was a favourite out of the golden era of the serial. Orange UK describe Mike as one of the serial's "hottest spunks". LoveFilm describe Mike's storylines as serious and give him the nickname "motorbike Mike". A writer from Heat magazine called Mike "cheesy, but gorgeous". In 2022, Kate Randall (also from Heat) included Mike and Jane in the magazine's top ten Neighbours characters of all time feature. Randall stated that Mike assumed the role of the "quiet teen". Mike was placed at number twenty-nine on the Huffpost's "35 greatest Neighbours characters of all time" feature. Journalist Adam Beresford described him as a "quiet teenager" who transformed into "a Speedo-clad pin up at the height of 80s Neighbours mania." He added that Mike was part of the show's dream team quartet" which consisted of Mike, Jane, Scott and Charlene.

Following his return in the revived series, Pearce received a nomination for Outstanding Guest Performer in a Drama Series at the 51st Daytime Emmy Awards.
