= Henry Ramsay (Neighbours) =

Fictional character from the Australian soap opera Neighbours

- Neighbours character
- Portrayed by: Craig McLachlan
- Duration: 1987–1989
- First appearance: 19 February 1987
- Last appearance: 23 November 1989
- Introduced by: Reg Watson
In-universe information
- Other names: Henry Mitchell
- Occupation: Gardener; Bartender; Waiter; Undertaker; Disc jockey
- Family: Ramsay
- Father: Fred Mitchell
- Mother: Madge Bishop
- Stepfather: Harold Bishop
- Sisters: Charlene Robinson
- Half-brothers: Sam Cole
- Wife: Bronwyn Davies (1990–)
- Grandfathers: Dan Ramsay
- Grandmothers: Edna Ramsay
- Uncles: Max Ramsay; Tom Ramsay
- Nephews: Daniel Robinson
- Nieces: Madison Robinson
- First cousins: Shane Ramsay; Danny Ramsay

Henry Ramsay (also Mitchell) is a fictional character from the Australian soap opera Neighbours, played by Craig McLachlan. He made his first screen appearance on 19 February 1987. Henry is the only son of Fred and Madge Mitchell and brother to Charlene and Sam Cole. Henry was known as a joker and was always coming up with schemes to make money. Henry dated Sue Parker and Melanie Pearson before beginning a relationship with Bronwyn Davies. He later moved to New Zealand to be a Disc jockey and married Bronwyn. He departed on 23 November 1989. McLachlan won three Logie Awards for his role as Henry during his time with Neighbours.

== Casting ==
Following the departure of Peter O'Brien (Shane Ramsay), producers began a search for a new "hunk" to keep the female viewers interested. McLachlan was 21 when he auditioned for Neighbours. McLachlan had a small role playing a student on the show Sons and Daughters. The director was impressed with his performance and recommended him to Sue Manger who worked in casting at Grundy. McLachlan had two auditions for the role and producers offered him the role and asked him to begin filming a week later. Recalling his auditions, McLachlan said "I just flirted with the producers like a madman. I thought, if I can make them fall in love with me and tell some funny stories, what I lack in technical, you know, ability they might think, "Oh, no, the kid's got something." Critics initially dismissed McLachlan as another "pretty boy" and he admitted that he had heard the comments. He said that while they might be right, there is some talent there too. McLachlan initially signed on to Neighbours for six weeks.

When McLachlan's contract came up for renewal a rival network made him an offer. McLachlan was no longer enjoying Neighbours and he signed the deal. However, the owner of the network had tried to make an offer for MGM studios and when it fell through he fled Australia and McLachlan's new contract was cancelled. McLachlan then joined rival soap Home and Away. Of his decision to leave Neighbours, McLachlan said that he had had his fill of the role and added "After being in Neighbours for three years Henry became...not easy to play." In 2005, it was rumoured that McLachlan was to be one of the many ex-cast members who would be returning for the show's 20th anniversary, however, he did not appear.

During an interview with TV Week McLachlan was asked if he would return to Neighbours and he said "If I had a dollar for every time fans of that era of the show ask if there's any chance that Henry will go back – even for the briefest cameo appearance! There is part of me that always thinks, "Oh, if I could somehow wrangle it and juggle it in with things, it would be so much fun!" But then part of me goes, "Nah". It would be terrible to go back and... none of the rest of the gang are there." In December 2014, McLachlan announced that he was unable to return as Henry for Neighbours' 30th anniversary due to scheduling conflicts and his involvement in The Doctor Blake Mysteries. However, McLachlan agreed to take part in the documentary special Neighbours 30th: The Stars Reunite, which aired in Australia and the UK in March 2015.

== Characterisation ==
Upon his arrival in Ramsay Street, Henry was described as "living under a cloud of suspicion" from the other neighbours after they learnt about his criminal record. He was also described as being streetwise, irresistible and a ladies man. Henry counteracted his "beefy image" by being a bit mischievous and "good for a laugh". This led to him being called the "Punk who turned Hunk" by John Kercher in his 1989 Neighbours: facts, features, interviews with your favourite TV stars book. McLachlan described his character as being "fun-loving" and "wacky". He added "he always has a head full of plots and schemes which rarely pay off, but we are led to believe that beneath Henry's flirtatious banter there lies a guy who is genuinely lovable". McLachlan was able to identify with certain elements of Henry's personality. He said "He's a fairly zany guy who loves a practical joke and so do I. He has the same sense of humour as me".

== Storylines ==
Henry is the eldest child and only son of Fred (Nick Waters) and Madge Mitchell (Anne Charleston). He was born in Coffs Harbour with his sister Charlene. Henry was a prankster and was always coming up with new ideas to make some easy money, even though most of his plans failed. Henry fell in with a bad crowd when he was 19 and the gang took part in an armed robbery. Henry was framed as the ring leader of the gang and was sentenced to three years in prison. When Madge visits him, he refuses to see her. When he is eligible for parole, Henry punches a guard who breaks up an altercation between him and his cellmate Wheels (Scott Lucey), leading to his parole being revoked. Upon his eventual release in 1987, Henry decides to go to his mother's house in Erinsborough after she pays off a gambling debt he racked up while in prison.

Madge is not happy to see Henry and she sends him away. Just as Henry leaves, Charlene runs after him and tells him that Madge has changed her mind and he moves in with them. Henry's cousin, Shane is wary of him as he had stolen many things from him when they were younger. Shane is suspicious when $100 disappears from the room they share and instantly blames Henry. The missing money is found and Shane apologises. After struggling to find a job due to his criminal record, Henry takes over Shane's gardening business when he leaves Erinsborough.

Henry's former cellmate, Kenny Larkin (Russell Crowe), comes to The Waterhole, the local pub where Madge and Henry work. Paul Robinson (Stefan Dennis), Madge's boss, accuses her of theft after Henry pays for a round of drinks with a $50 bill and Kenny claims to have paid for the second round with another $50 bill. Madge checks the till and finds only one $50 note, Henry's and Kenny proves he has given her $50 by reciting the last three digits on the note. Paul fires Madge and Henry accuses them of running a scam. Henry becomes determined to prove his and his mother's innocence and tracks down Kenny's sister B.B. (Tamasin Ramsay) who reveals that Kenny pulled cash scams on a regular basis. They tell Paul who reinstates Madge and Henry. When Kenny begins informing Henry's customers about his criminal past in revenge, the two men fight.

After Charlene's wedding to Scott Robinson (Jason Donovan), Henry and Madge change their surnames from Mitchell to Ramsay after Fred's debts begin to be passed on to them. Madge later marries her childhood sweetheart, Harold Bishop (Ian Smith). Henry gets on well with Harold and enjoys playing jokes on him. Henry dates both Sue Parker (Kate Gorman) and Melanie Pearson (Lucinda Cowden) before falling for Sally Wells (Rowena Mohr). Henry competes with mechanic Tony Romeo (Nick Carrafa) for Sally, but Henry wins and they begin a relationship. Despite Henry proposing to Sally, she leaves Erinsborough to go to Europe. Henry buys a metal detector after his grandfather Dan (Syd Conabere) tells him there is gold in the creek at the bottom of the Ramsay garden. He does not find anything, but begins searching the other gardens in Ramsay Street. Henry finds a gun in Mrs. Mangel's (Vivean Gray) garden that belonged to her estranged son, Joe (Mark Little). Henry helps Mrs Mangel's granddaughter Jane Harris (Annie Jones) track Joe down. Henry and Joe later become friends and go into partnership together in a gardening business.

Henry falls for Bronwyn Davies (Rachel Friend) when she arrives in Ramsay Street. Bronwyn likes Henry, but as a friend and she begins dating Mike Young (Guy Pearce). Bronwyn and Mike eventually end their relationship, but it takes months before she and Henry admit they love each other. After Bronwyn accidentally pushes Henry down some stairs, Bronwyn confesses her love for him and they begin a relationship. The couple find it difficult to be alone together, especially as Bronwyn's sister Sharon Davies (Jessica Muschamp) is staying with her and Harold's daughter Kerry (Linda Hartley) and granddaughter Sky (Miranda Fryer) have moved into the Ramsay house. They decide to move in together, but are unable to afford a place of their own. Madge later agrees to let them move in with her.

Henry proposes to Bronwyn and they plan to marry in a double ceremony with Joe and Kerry. Bronwyn's father Gordon (Tim Robertson) tries to talk her out of marrying Henry. Bronwyn then tries to convince her father that she loves Henry. Bronwyn postpones the wedding for a few months and Henry is heartbroken. However, he is comforted by the fact that she is not ending their relationship. Henry becomes a DJ on Erinsborough Community Radio and after a slow start, he gains many listeners and becomes very popular. Henry is offered a high paying job as a DJ in New Zealand and he and Bronwyn decide that he should take the job. Henry says a tearful goodbye to Madge and Bronwyn and leaves Erinsborough. Bronwyn joins him a few months later when she lands a job as a vet in New Zealand and they eventually marry.

== Reception ==
In 1989, McLachlan's portrayal of Henry saw him win the Logie Award for 'Most Popular Actor'. He was also nominated for 'Most Popular Personality'. The following year he won the 'Most Popular Actor' award again and 'Most Popular Personality'. In the UK, 16.6 million viewers watched Henry leave Ramsay Street in 1991. In a 1990 poll ran by Woman magazine, readers voted McLachlan as the top male soap actor for his portrayal of Henry.

In an AOL Entertainment feature called "Old Neighbours" they said "Shamefully, we used to get quite excited at the prospect of Henry from Neighbours in his dungarees. Oh yes. Craig McLachlan is still – wait for it – a cracker". Entertainment website Virgin Media hosted a special feature on 'retro soap hunks', profiling select fictional characters they believed were popular. They included Henry, branding him a retro hunk and calling him a cheeky prankster. They also stated: "His boyish charm meant he usually got away with murder. He was a bit of beefcake and paraded around in singlets and shorts, showing off his muscles." Orange.co.uk branded Henry's appearance as that of a "mulleted larrikin".

Ruth Deller of television website Lowculture gave Henry a four out of five for his contribution to Neighbours, during a feature called "A guide to recognising your Ramsays and Robinsons". Deller said "Long before Toadie, Ramsay Street's favourite DJ, prankster and most frequently caught in the nude resident was poodle-permed Henry (although, arguably before him it was Clive Gibbons). Madge's eldest son was often used as a comic foil rather than someone at the centre of dramatic plot lines". A writer from Sky Living branded Henry as "uber curly-haired" and joked that fans would be overjoyed to see his return if they were some of the ones who spent "many an afternoon of their youth fancying Henry Ramsey in his dungarees."
