= Kearley =

Kearley is a surname. Notable people with the surname include:

- Bull Kearley (1891–1977), American college football player
- Charles Kearley (1904–1989), English property developer and art collector
- Michelle Kearley, Australian actress

== See also ==
- Kearney (surname)
