= Bronwyn Davies =

- Neighbours character
- Portrayed by: Rachel Friend
- Duration: 1988–1990
- First appearance: 7 July 1988
- Last appearance: 22 February 1990
- Introduced by: Don Battye
In-universe information
- Occupation: Nanny; Vet
- Father: Gordon Davies
- Mother: Katherine Davies
- Brothers: Bill Davies
- Sisters: Sharon Davies
- Husband: Henry Ramsay (1990–)
- Aunts: Edith Chubb

Bronwyn Davies is a fictional character from the Australian television soap opera Neighbours, played by Rachel Friend. She made her first appearance during the episode broadcast on 7 July 1988. Bronwyn is the sister of Sharon Davies. Bronwyn fell in love with Henry Ramsay and when he left for New Zealand, she followed him not long after. Bronwyn departed on 22 February 1990.

== Casting ==
After Kylie Minogue (Charlene Robinson) decided to depart the show to pursue a singing career, producers wanted to replace her with a similar actress, and were planning to start a nationwide search when they found and cast Friend as Bronwyn. Friend was eighteen when she joined the cast and she chose to postpone an arts degree course at Melbourne University for the role. Friend said she had decided to take the year off in order to get acting work, so she was "rapt" about securing a job on Neighbours. Her casting was announced in June 1988, and she told a reporter for The Sun-Herald: "I'm a bit overwhelmed by it all but I think I'm going to like working on Neighbours." Friend was initially contracted for 13 weeks, but Darren Devlyn of TV Week expected this to be extended following a positive reaction from producers. While discussing Minogue's exit and Friend's arrival, actor Ian Smith, who played Harold Bishop, said Friend "has great appeal and will be a total replacement. She's won't have any of Charlene's characteristics." Friend made her first appearance as Bronwyn on 7 July 1988. Viewer reaction to her character was so positive that she was later given a one-year contract.

== Development ==
Bronwyn is a country girl. In her fictional backstory, she had to give up her schooling when her mother died and she had to take on several new responsibilities, which made her "pretty domestic". Friend described her as "practical, sensible and quite serious." Friend thought she was more outgoing than Bronwyn, who she called a "hick" and said she was too quiet.

Bronwyn is introduced amid the disappearance of toddler Jamie Clarke (S.J. Dey) at a shopping centre. While his father Des Clarke (Paul Keane) looks away, Jamie is taken by a young girl, who soon abandons him. Bronwyn then finds Jamie and returns him to Des, but not without lecturing him first. Of her introduction, Friend explained "She (Bronwyn) certainly has a lot to say in her early scenes. She tells Des he's an incompetent father, then ends up becoming Jamie's new nanny." Bronwyn also plays a small role in the break-up between Mike Young (Guy Pearce) and Jane Harris (Annie Jones) when she points out to Des that Jane has a romantic interest in him. Friend stated "Bronwyn is very confident and outspoken. With Des and Jane, she really puts her foot in it without meaning harm. It also turns out that Mike is a little jealous of her."

Producers paired Bronwyn with Mike for a brief romance storyline. This led to Friend's first on-screen kiss, which she admitted to being scared about filming. She said "I was so nervous, but after I'd kissed him once it was all right – I did feel a bit self-conscious, but I realised nobody takes any notice and it means nothing."

In October 1989, Darren Devlyn of TV Week confirmed that Friend had decided to quit the serial. Her decision came shortly after her partner and co-star Craig McLachlan relocated to Sydney to join the cast of fellow soap opera Home and Away. Friend said it was "a career decision", as she wanted to try other things. She filmed her final scenes in December. On-screen, Bronwyn moves to New Zealand to be with Mclachlan's character Henry Ramsay, whom she later marries.

== Storylines ==
Bronwyn was born in Narrabri, New South Wales, to Gordon (Tim Robertson) and Katherine Davies. Katherine died when Bronwyn was fourteen and her aunt Edith Chubb (Irene Inescort) helped raise her and her sister, Sharon Davies (Jessica Muschamp). Bronwyn moves to Erinsborough to begin a course in childcare. One day she finds toddler Jamie Clarke alone at a supermarket and she criticises his father Des Clarke for being careless. Bronwyn attends an interview for a position as a nanny and is shocked when the interviewer turns out to be Des. In spite of this, Des and Bronwyn put their differences aside and he invites her to move in. Bronwyn begins dating Mike Young, but their relationship crumbles after she feels out of place with Mike's university friends Jackie Vidor (Shona Ford) and Brad Fuller (Scott Snibson). Bronwyn moves in with Nell Mangel (Vivean Gray) and Jane Harris, and is later joined by Sharon.

Henry Ramsay takes an interest in Bronwyn and she falls for him too. Bronwyn invites him over for dinner, which he accepts. However, when Henry reveals that he has invited Jane and Joe Mangel (Mark Little) too, Bronwyn shoves Henry causing him to fall down some steps, knocking him unconscious. Bronwyn panics and professes her love for Henry, which he hears when he wakes up. After Edith arrives in Erinsborough to keep an eye on her nieces, Henry and Bronwyn begin looking for their own place. Henry's mother, Madge (Anne Charleston), agrees to let the couple stay with her and husband Harold Bishop. Mike offers to tutor Bronwyn for her exams, while Henry is away helping his sister repair her house. Mike makes a move on Bronwyn and they share a kiss. Harold sees them and tells Madge, who confronts Bronwyn. When Henry returns from Brisbane, he finds out and they split up, but decide to remain friends.

Bronwyn starts receiving poison pen letters and Henry agrees to help catch the culprit. After Henry fails and is caught with the evidence, Bronwyn is convinced it is him. It later emerges that Bronwyn's ex-boyfriend from Narrabri is responsible. Bronwyn and Henry get back together and become engaged. On the day of the wedding, Gordon arrives and tries to talk Bronwyn out of marrying Henry and he is successful to a degree. Bronwyn tells Henry she will marry him, just not on that day. After Henry takes a job as a DJ in New Zealand, Bronwyn misses him and when she is heard talking to "Henry", Madge and Harold worry for her sanity, but they discover Henry is a Possum she found. Bronwyn takes a job as a veterinarian in New Zealand and she joins Henry. The couple later marry.

== Reception ==
For her portrayal of Bronwyn, Friend received a nomination for the 1989 Logie Award for Most Popular New Talent. The following year, she won the Logie Award for Most Popular Actress. During a feature on past Neighbours characters, telecommunications network Orange, described Bronwyn's most memorable moment as: "Accidentally pushing good pal Henry Ramsay (played by Craig McLachlan) down some steps. Believing the mulleted larrikin was unconscious, Bronwyn rushed to his side and professed her undying love for him – whereupon Henry opened his eyes and admitted he felt the same. Aaah!" Ruth Deller, of entertainment website Lowculture, said Bronwyn was "sweet." The BBC said Bronwyn's most notable moment was "Meeting Henry Ramsay."
