= Joe Mangel =

- Neighbours character
- Joe as he appeared in 2005
- Portrayed by: Mark Little
- Duration: 1988–1991, 2005, 2022
- First appearance: 8 August 1988
- Last appearance: 28 July 2022
- Created by: Ray Kolle
- Introduced by: Don Battye (1988); Ric Pellizzeri (2005); Jason Herbison (2022)
- Joe as he appeared in his early years (1989)
In-universe information
- Other names: Walter Joseph Mangel
- Occupation: Gardener; Construction worker Handyman
- Father: Len Mangel
- Mother: Nell Mangel
- Sisters: Amanda Harris
- Wife: Noeline Mangel (backstory); Kerry Bishop (1989–1990); Melanie Pearson (1991–; divorced)
- Sons: Toby Mangel
- Adoptive daughters: Sky Mangel
- Grandsons: Scotty (adoptive)
- Granddaughters: Kerry Mangel (adoptive)
- Uncles: Cedric Mangel
- Aunts: Isabelle
- Nieces: Jane Harris

Joe Mangel is a fictional character from the Australian Network Ten soap opera Neighbours, played by Mark Little. He debuted on-screen in the episode airing on 8 August 1988. Joe left in 1991 when Little departed the serial. In 2005 Little agreed to reprise the role as part of Neighbours' twentieth anniversary celebrations and remained for four months. Joe's storylines included his bad relationship with his mother, being widowed, life as a single parent and a custody battle to keep his child. Joe is deemed a stereotype Australian man and a likable rogue character. Little returned to Neighbours in 2022 to celebrate the show's initial final episode.

== Casting ==
Actor Mark Little joined the cast of Neighbours in 1988. He took up the offer to play Joe Mangel, after being blacklisted from various work opportunities due to his strong ties to the union and the "overtly political nature" of his solo theatre shows. The role was originally intended to last for three months. Of how he approached the part, Little wrote "I committed myself to the task. And I made the idea more palatable by deciding that I would treat it as a pop art experiment, after all, no one was watching. Little did I know that I would be dabbling with similar themes as Mary Shelley's Frankenstein. Like Dr. Frankenstein, I was about to create a pop monster. The wild man, Joe Mangel". Little's contract was later extended.

== Development ==
=== Characterisation ===
On Joe's arrival it became apparent that he was nothing like his mother Nell Mangel (Vivean Gray). Joe has been described as an "unreconstructed oaf who likes drinking beer", he is green fingered and loves gardening and also acts brutish. He also has a love for betting and likes to keep up with the status quo. Many of Joe's traits annoyed other residents, with Nell and Dorothy Burke (Maggie Dence) constantly trying to make Joe behave himself and change his ways. He would often clash with his niece Jane Harris (Annie Jones) who also hated Joe's love for loud music, football and beer drinking. When his son Toby (Ben Guerens) came to live with him he had a hard time adjusting to fatherhood and saw it as a chore at first, later he began to realise Toby's clever potential, he became proud and transformed into a good father. Through his relationship with Kerry Bishop (Linda Hartley-Clark), Joe was portrayed as being the complete opposite of her, he remained acting out his blunt and sometimes selfish ways, however, he truly loved her.

Little has branded Joe as a "massive character" within the serial, also stating that viewers still have enormous affection for him due to his storylines. In an interview with the newspaper Derby Telegraph, Little described his persona and links to the British public stating: "He was a single dad, struggling to get along, a bit of a battler. He appealed to the English psyche and became a bit of a folk hero". He also spoke about Joe still representing the old Australian archetype when he returned in 2005. Little described this change stating: "Joe is like one of a dying breed – I don't know if there are really too many Joe Mangels left. He was a genuine, easy bloke that is dying out. He knew the language. He could have been one of the last Australians!"

=== Departure and returns ===
Following Kerry's death, writers planned a storyline exploring the parental rights over Joe's step-daughter, Sky Mangel (Miranda Fryer). In December 1990, a writer from TV Week revealed that writers would explore a custody battle between Joe and Sky's biological father, Eric Jensen (John Ley). He wants to take Sky to live with him in New Zealand. The writer added that the storyline would be "heart-wrenching" as Joe feels he cannot "cope with the thought of another blow" after losing Kerry.

In 1991, Little decided to quit the serial when his contract came up for renewal. Network Ten told TV Week that "Mark has been with the show since June 1988 and I think he feels it's time to move on. As with any ongoing drama, it's the nature of the production." Little suffered with typecasting after his departure from the show. He commented, "Joe Mangel was my creation and he rather ungallantly went about stealing my identity in a bizarre case of metaphysical identity theft."

In 2005, Little agreed to reprise his role as Joe in a four-month guest capacity, as part of Neighbours' twentieth anniversary celebrations. Little said that he was not sure if it was a mistake as he felt that Joe no longer fitted in because of Australia's change in culture. The character had changed and Little believed Joe living in the countryside contributed to this. Once "a very suburban" character Joe returns as a "bushie" after living on a cattle station. He added that his character does not blend back into his former lifestyle. In 2008, Little said it was unlikely he would ever return to the show again, describing Joe as "just a fond memory". In 2010, former co-star Janet Andrewartha (who plays Lyn Scully) called for Joe to return for Lyn, also wanting to work with Little again. However, Little gave confirmation that he would not return again because he felt that Joe has "had his time".

On 7 May 2022, Dan Seddon of Digital Spy announced Little had reprised the role for the final episodes of Neighbours following its cancellation. Joe was one of numerous characters reintroduced for the show's end. The "most memorable characters" from each decade were chosen to return and executive producer Jason Herbison explained that it ensured there was "something for everyone as Neighbours draws to a close." The character's return scene airs on 15 July in the UK and 21 July 2022 in Australia. Joe's former father-in-law Harold Bishop (Ian Smith) contacts him via a video call to ask about his relationship with Melanie, who is now engaged to Toadfish Rebecchi (Ryan Moloney). Harold is worried that Melanie will hurt Toadie's children, like he believes she did Toby and Sky when she left. However, Joe admits that he twisted the truth about her behaviour and that he and the children were lucky to have her around.

== Storylines ==
=== Backstory ===
Joe was the youngest child of Nell and Len Mangel (John Lee). In contrast to his studious sister, Amanda (Briony Behets), Joe was laid back and roguish and often disappointed his mother. Joe and Nell's relationship fell apart when Nell found a gun and immediately assumed Joe was involved in a hold-up on a local service station. Joe left home and moved to Darwin and later fell in love with and married Noeline (Lindy McConchie). They had a son called Toby. Joe could not cope with the financial burden of a family and left when Toby was three.

=== 1988–2022 ===
While metal detecting, Henry Ramsay (Craig McLachlan) finds a pistol buried in the back yard of Number 32 Ramsay Street. Joe's niece, Jane, who lives there with her grandmother, Nell, asks about the gun. Nell tells her the gun belongs to Joe. Jane, with the help of Henry goes to track Joe down and they find him in Erinsborough. On their first meeting, Joe initially mistakes Jane and Henry for salespeople and slams the door on them. Jane refuses to give up and eventually Joe agrees to see Nell after years of estrangement once the gun was mentioned. The gun issue is resolved but Nell and Joe's relationship takes a while to develop. Joe eventually moves in with his mother.

When Nell begins courting John Worthington (Brian James), Joe is very protective of her. In the end, he sees John loves her and gives the couple his blessing. Joe walks his mother down the aisle on their wedding day. After Nell and John move to England, Joe moves in a lot of his furniture and bonds with Nell's dog Bouncer. Joe receives a shock when his ex-wife Noeline makes a reappearance with Toby (Finn Greentree-Keane), who is now nine. Noeline leaves Toby with Joe, who takes a while to get used to being a father and initially sees Toby as soft. However, Joe eventually warms to Toby. When Noeline arrives to collect Toby, Joe is sad to see him leave. When Toby accidentally spills ketchup on Joe, Ted Vickers (John Jacobs), Noeline's new husband and Toby's stepfather, lunges to strike Toby, but is stopped by Joe who threatens him. Joe is horrified when Toby reveals Ted has been beating both himself and Noeline. After Joe comes to the rescue of his ex-wife and their son, he and Noeline work out an understanding between them.

Joe later begins seeing Kerry Bishop (Linda Hartley), her father Harold (Ian Smith) is not best pleased with that especially when he finds out Kerry had spent the night with Joe. Kerry does not really want to get seriously involved but Joe's quick thinking, when her daughter Sky is bitten by a redback spider while on a picnic, manages to sway her feelings. Joe and Kerry decide to get married alongside their friends Henry and Bronwyn Davies (Rachel Friend), and Jane and her fiancée Des Clarke (Paul Keane) in a triple wedding ceremony. When Nell falls ill in England, Jane decides to fly out and visit her. Joe and Kerry marry alone in a butterfly sanctuary with all their family and friends present.

Noeline returns wanting Toby to live with her in Darwin, having got a new job there. Toby makes a hard choice and decides to go and live with his mother up north and shares a tearful goodbye with Joe and Kerry. This is short-lived as Noeline is hit by a car and instantly killed, forcing Toby to return to Joe and Kerry. Joe and Kerry help Toby through his grief when he begins bed wetting, sleepwalking and generally lashing out. A while later Joe and Kerry agree to adopt each other's children. Tragedy strikes later that year when Kerry is shot by a stray bullet while protesting against duck hunters; she is rushed to hospital, but she dies in theatre and also loses the baby she is carrying. Joe and Harold are left grief-stricken.

Following Kerry's funeral, Sky's biological father, Eric, decides to claim custody of Sky. Joe loses in court and Eric is awarded custody. Joe makes a desperate attempt to hang on to his daughter and grabs her while Eric and his wife are not looking and heads off into the Bush with her and Toby and hide out at Mary Crombie's (Alethea McGrath) farm. Joe, after much persuasion from Harold, eventually gives himself up and returns Sky to the Jensens. Eric eventually hands Sky back to Joe when he admitted cannot cope with her as well as a new baby he and his wife, Sandy (Donna Woodhouse) are due to have and soon will be moving to New Zealand.

Joe later falls for his lodger Melanie Pearson (Lucinda Cowden) and they later marry. On hearing the news that Nell had had another heart attack, Joe realizes that he and Melanie will have to sell the house to afford the medical bills. On leaving for England, Joe arranges for Toby to live with school principal Dorothy Burke (Maggie Dence), who lives next door, while they were gone. Joe, Melanie and Sky later return to Australia and send for Toby to join them in the countryside. Dorothy also lands a teaching post at Toby's new school and they leave. Several years later, Joe and Melanie divorce.

Joe returns to Erinsborough on the eve of Sky's (now played by Stephanie McIntosh) 18th birthday and stays for several months. He has many clashes with Janelle Timmins (Nell Feeney) and his former-in-laws, the Bishops. Joe becomes romantically involved with Lyn Scully. Lyn's eldest daughter, Stephanie (Carla Bonner) resents this union, but comes around. Joe proves to be a great support to Harold and Sky after David (Kevin Harrington), Liljana (Marcella Russo) and Serena (Lara Sacher) die in a plane crash above Bass Strait. Joe and Lyn announce their engagement but it is cut short when Toby phones from Western Australia needing help on his farm. Joe is reluctant to leave, but Lyn persuades him to go and help his son. Joe then leaves town after saying goodbye to Sky. In 2018, Joe telephones Jane to inform her that Nell has died.

4 years later, Joe speaks to Harold on a video call and explains that Melanie, who is marrying Toadie, was a good step mum to Sky and Toby. Joe tells Harold that he and Melanie broke up around his and Kerry's anniversary and he twisted the truth in anger. Joe explains that Sky and Toby stopped talking about Melanie in fear of being yelled at, however at Christmas, they explained how good of a step mum she was. Joe then fist bumps Harold through the screen before hanging up. Joe later sends Toadie and Melanie a video call, congratulating them after their wedding and telling Melanie that he wishes her all the best.

== Reception ==
Tony Squires from The Sydney Morning Herald believed that producers should have better developed the on-screen partnership between Joe and Des, commenting "still, shove Des and Joe together and you have something." Hilary Kingsley, writing for the Daily Mirror, praised Little for his portrayal of Joe when Kerry died, stating "The howling grief of husband Joe – Neighbours' best actor Mark Little – was almost too moving for Ramsay Street." Joe became popular in the UK due to his personality. The Peterborough Evening Telegraph brand Joe as the serial's "likeable rogue".

In 2010 to celebrate Neighbours' 25th anniversary Sky, a British satellite broadcasting company included Joe in their feature on the 25 characters who they believed were the most memorable in the series history. They described him as the series' first "easygoing Aussie" to be featured, stating: "For an Australian soap, Neighbours has surprisingly few blokey blokes. Perhaps that's because few were going to out-bloke Joe Mangel after he left – with a stubby in hand and probably some shrimp on the barbie, Joe was the originally easygoing Aussie. That provided a useful breath of fresh air to all the grown-ups who've tried to make him behave himself over the years, including nan Mrs Mangel, guardian of his son Dorothy, and father-in-law Harold. While not exactly dependable, he stayed on hand to support step-daughter Sky after the plane crash of 2005."

Editor of MSN TV, Lorna Cooper branded Joe as one of the legendary characters of the series, despite his short duration. Each of the Daily Mirror's columnists were asked to choose their favourite soap opera character, Polly Hudson chose Joe. She cited his "Funny, sweet and ute-obsessed" personality and the comedy moments he provided as her reasons for choosing him. Orange UK agree with Joe's loveable larrikin status adding it was his style and state he is famous for his relationship with Bouncer, referring to it as touching.

Sue Heath from The Northern Echo said that commented on his return, opining that he "waltzed back into Erinsborough with a cheery 'Good day, chuck' as though he'd never been away" Joe was placed at number thirty-three on the Huffpost's "35 greatest Neighbours characters of all time" feature. Journalist Adam Beresford described him as a "true blue Aussie bloke" who was the "polar opposite of his uptight estranged mother". He added that Joe was a "unreconstructed beer lover" who "ramped up the comedy element" of the show. A Herald Sun reporter included Joe and Kerry's wedding in their "Neighbours' 30 most memorable moments" feature and assessed that they "were polar opposites but they were married in the butterfly enclosure at Melbourne Zoo."
