= Sugar and Spice (Australian TV series) =

- Genre: Children's television
- Directed by: John Gauci
- Starring: Radha Mitchell; Michelle Kearley; Penelope Shelton; Louise Hall; Eamon A. Kelly; Matthew Newton; Susan Ellis
- Composer: Peter Moscos
- Country of origin: Australia
- Original language: English
- No. of seasons: 2
- No. of episodes: 20

Production
- Executive producer: John Gauci
- Producers: Frank Brown, Louise Hall, John Gauci; Film Victoria, Revcom Television
- Editors: Alan Ryan, John Gauci
- Camera setup: Philip Gross
- Running time: 25 minutes

Original release
- Network: ABC TV
- Release: 1988 – 1989

Sugar and Spice is an Australian children's television series that was broadcast on ABC TV between 1988 and 1989.

Starring Radha Mitchell as Pixie Robinson and Michelle Kearley as Molly Wilson, the series was set in the 1920s and revolved around two eleven-year-old girls from the Australian bush, who were sent to live with Pixie's grandmother to attend the same private high-school in the city.

The Complete Series was released on DVD in 2008 by Force Entertainment.

== Cast ==
=== Starring ===
- Radha Mitchell as Pixie Robertson
- Michelle Kearley as Molly Wilson

=== Relatives ===
- Howard Bell as Mr Robertson
- Louise Siversen as Mrs Beatrice Robertson
- Colwyn Roberts as Mr Wilson
- Ruth Yaffe as Mrs Edna Wilson
- Penelope Shelton as Grandma
- Louise Hall as Aunt Vera
- Susan Ellis as Anne
- Eamonn Kelly as Jimmy
- Matthew Newton as Freddo

=== Friends ===
- Earl Francis as Captain Jack
- Esme Melville as Mrs Watson

=== Teachers ===
- Judith Graham as Mrs Meyer
- Marijke Mann as Miss Orrick
- Victor Kazan as Jacques Chevrier
- Lindy McConchie (Davini Malcolm) as Miss Pittman

=== Students ===
- Vivienne Walshe as Marguerite Chevrier
- Rana Melville-Smith as Louise
- Belinda Hutchinson as Lucy Forrest
- Penelope MacGowan as Elsie
- Georgia Falcke as Mary
- Samantha Payne as Esmerelda
- Bindi Edwards as Myrtle
- Sarah Young as Edith
- Nathalie Woolcock as Ruth
- Kyra Opray as Meg
- Emily Chen as Emily
- Elizabeth Catherall as Edna
- Kirsten Geary as Ruby
- Sandra Willis as Sandra

== Episode list ==
1. Going Ready or Not.
2. The Arrival
3. Froggy
4. The Best of Enemies
5. Guiding Hands
6. The Haunted House
7. A String of Pearls
8. The Picnic
9. To See or Not to See
10. The Barnstormer
11. What's Cooking
12. Birds, Bees and Rabiits
13. Money Troubles
14. The Camp Out
15. The Substitute
16. Creating a New Molly
17. Exam time
18. True or False
19. The Pageant
20. Ending or Beginnings

== Book ==
- Mary Wright: Sugar and Spice, Puffin Books, 1988, ISBN 978-0-14-032970-4

== See also ==
- List of programs broadcast by ABC (Australian TV network)
- List of Australian television series
