= Michelle Kearley =

Australian actress

Michelle Kearley is a former Australian child actress. She was cast for the lead role of Molly Wilson in the Australian children's television series Sugar and Spice and as student Jessie Ross for seven episodes of the Australian soap opera Neighbours in 1988.
