= Nell Mangel =

Fictional character from Neighbours

- Neighbours character
- Portrayed by: Vivean Gray
- Duration: 1986–1988
- First appearance: 29 April 1986
- Last appearance: 25 October 1988
- Created by: Ray Kolle
- Introduced by: Reg Watson
In-universe information
- Other names: Eleanor Mangel; Nell Worthington; Mrs Mangel
- Occupation: Retired hotel housekeeper
- Sisters: Isabelle
- Husband: Len Mangel (1946–87); John Worthington (1988–; his death)
- Sons: Joe Mangel
- Daughters: Amanda Harris
- Grandsons: Toby Mangel
- Granddaughters: Jane Harris; Sky Mangel (adoptive)

Nell Mangel (also Worthington) is a fictional character from the Australian soap opera Neighbours, played by Vivean Gray. She made her first on-screen appearance on 29 April 1986 and was known almost exclusively as Mrs Mangel. The character caused controversy among some of the public, who in turn abused Gray constantly because of Nell. In the short time she was in the series her constant sparring with Madge Bishop (Anne Charleston) was a focal point in her storylining, as well as being a continual annoyance among her neighbours with her nosy, interfering and nasty attitude. She is often described as one of the series' most iconic characters and one of its greatest villains.

== Casting ==
Vivean Gray was cast in the role after she previously played a similar role to that of Nell in another Australian soap opera, The Sullivans. Mrs Mangel was only supposed to appear in Neighbours for three weeks. However, the character proved popular with viewers and she became a permanent member of the cast. Gray decided to quit the series in 1988; one of the main reasons that helped her reach the decision was the high amount of abuse received from the public who failed to distinguish Gray from her character, often taunting her for her character's cantankerous personality. After leaving, Gray quit acting altogether and moved back to her native United Kingdom. Co-star Ian Smith, who played Harold Bishop, also passed comment on the situation, stating that it was mainly youths who used to hound Gray, because of their dislike of Nell. Gray spoke about her decision to quit, stating: "I loved Neighbours and the rest of the cast were marvellous. But because it was so successful, I could barely set foot outside my own door without someone screaming abuse at horrid old "Mrs Mangel". People didn't seem to appreciate it was acting. So I decided to take a break." In 1989 Gray revealed that she would consider returning in the future after everything calmed down, but this never happened.

== Characterisation ==
Nell is a very much a busybody: she is interfering, nosy and always gossiping. She is frosty and old-fashioned as she does not like to be called by her first name. She constantly spies on her Neighbours and tells tales about them. She insists she is a good Christian woman. She constantly moans and whines throughout her time in the serial. She has also been portrayed as fending off other characters if they tried to be nice to her. It was the mixture of all these traits that allow Nell to become one of the most hated soap characters of her time. In the Neighbours twentieth anniversary book Nell is described as being "the Ramsay Street gossip, the Queen Bee of the cul-de-sac, and her constant interfering in the affairs of her neighbours did not always endear her to the street". Upon her departure, behind the scenes scriptwriters decided to give Nell a pleasant exit plot, seeing Nell finally finding happiness.

In the book "Soapbox", Gray compares Nell to Ida Jessup, a character she previously played in The Sullivans, stating: "Mrs Jessup and Mrs Mangel are sisters under the skin, they were both gossips with too many opinions. But Jessup had saving graces – she would help people – Mangel is mean and bitchy." However, Sarah Ellis from Inside Soap wrote that Nell did have some redeeming features. She took care of her granddaughter Jane Harris (Annie Jones) after her mother moved to Hong Kong, she loved Bouncer the Labrador, and she had unrequited feelings for Harold Bishop.

In 2018, two years after Gray's death, producers reintroduced her granddaughter Jane for a storyline in which she tries to retrieve a set of valuable stamps from Nell's old house. However, before she finds the stamps, Jane learns Nell has died. Ellis (Inside Soap) commented the news would "no doubt be an upsetting moment for long-time Neighbours fans as they say goodbye to one of the show's most iconic characters".

== Storylines ==
Nell married Len Mangel (John Lee) and they had two children, Amanda (Briony Behets) and Joe (Mark Little). Amanda was highly praised as she excelled academically and married Peter Harris, a wealthy businessman. She later had a daughter, Jane. Joe proved to be a disappointment to his parents and he left home following an argument in which he was accused of robbing a local service station. Nell and Len decide to move into a smaller house in Ramsay Street and are later joined by Jane after Amanda and Peter leave for Hong Kong.

Nell quickly befriends Helen Daniels (Anne Haddy) and Eileen Clarke (Myra De Groot), the only people she lets refer to her by her Christian name. Her nosy and pious views are a constant source of annoyance for her neighbours, in particular Madge Bishop (Anne Charleston), Charlene Robinson (Kylie Minogue) and Daphne Clarke (Elaine Smith). When Jane begins seeing Mike Young (Guy Pearce), Nell tries to put a stop to it after receiving poison pen letters about Mike's alleged reputation of taking advantage of girls. After Sue Parker (Kate Gorman) is revealed as the culprit, Nell relents and lets Mike see Jane.

When Len leaves Nell for another woman, she is forced to invent excuses for his absence and at one point prompts suspicion from Jane and her friends, who believe Nell has killed Len, after they dig up the garden and find several of his personal effects. Nell eventually explains Len has left and will not return.

Nell allows Harold Bishop to lodge with her and Jane. Nell is pleased to learn Harold is a devout Christian and a man of high moral standards. Nell develops a rivalry with Madge, which reaches a new high after it became clear Harold is in love with Madge. Nell constantly tries to ruin their romance. Not accepting that she has not managed to split Madge and Harold up, she manages to spoil things on their wedding by playing the church organ badly on purpose. Nell befriends Mike's pet Labrador Bouncer and he eventually becomes a family pet.

While helping Daphne decorate a nursery for her unborn baby, Nell climbs up a ladder and is knocked to the ground by Bouncer and as a result suffers amnesia, losing two years of her life. She thinks Jane is still at school and Len is still around. Jane cannot bring herself to tell Nell that Len has left so she fabricates a story in which Len died and his ashes were scattered under the rosebushes in the front garden. Nell is then seen saying goodbye to the rosebushes, prompting people to think Nell is losing her sanity. Nell decides to sue Des and Daphne, but this action is unpopular with the neighbours and Nell finds herself isolated. Daphne takes her revenge by revealing the truth about Len's departure to Nell, who is horrified. She later agrees to settle out of court for a lesser sum.

After a heated confrontation in the street with Madge, Nell suffers a heart attack and rushed to hospital. Amanda returns home from Hong Kong seemingly to see her mother, but it turns out she is on the run for insurance fraud. Nell and Jane tell her to go and she leaves again. Len files for divorce and suggests he and Nell share the proceeds from the sale of Number 32. Nell refuses to leave and blackmails Len by threatening to follow him wherever he moved to, in order to keep the house.

Nell meets John Worthington (Brian James), a retired dentist, and falls in love with him. During this time, Joe returns and slowly manages to repair his frosty relationship with Nell, but takes a dislike to John at first, as he fears he will hurt Nell like his father did. After winning Joe round and getting his blessing, Nell and John marry and move to England.

When Jane returns to Ramsay Street, twenty years after Nell had left, she explains that she has been living with Nell, who is now widowed, and has adopted some of her views. It is revealed that Jane has returned to the Street to look for vintage stamps belonging to Len that Nell had hidden in the house now occupied by Shane (Nicholas Coghlan) and Dipi Rebecchi (Sharon Johal). Jane confesses to them that Nell is very ill and needs to go into care and that she was hoping to sell the stamps in order to raise the necessary funds. Shortly after, Joe calls Jane to tell her that Nell has died. Two years later, it is revealed that Nell's death had been caused by a heart attack whilst in hospital after having an argument with her great-granddaughter, Nicolette Stone (Charlotte Chimes).

== Reception ==
Although at the time Nell was disliked by some of the viewers, she later became remembered as an iconic and popular character. Comedy Central, a satellite television station which airs in the UK, commented on Nell, branding her as one of the series most iconic characters; it also added: "Nell Mangel was a woman who infuriated nearly everyone she encountered. She lived in 32 Ramsay Street from 1986 to '88 and was interfering, nosey and self-righteous. If ever there was an opportunity to ruin people's fun, be it rescuing Lucy Robinson from a well, Des and Daphne having a barbecue or Helen having another stroke, Mrs. Mangel would be promptly on the phone to report it to the police, the school or the parent concerned. Ooh, she was a cow!" The channel also added Gray's abuse from the public, in its opinion, was because her portrayal was so convincing.

A Scottish national newspaper, The Scotsman, has also praised the character for her nasty streak saying: "Vivean Gray made more of an impact in that short time on the Aussie soap than most actors manage in their entire careers. As the cantankerous Mrs Mangel – arch nemesis of feisty Madge Ramsay – Gray played one of the most detestable villains ever to set foot in Ramsay Street. Her nosiness and holier-than-thou-ness were bad enough, but it was in her dealings with Madge where she really raised the hackles of the Neighbours faithful." Media brand Orange has commented that Nell was interfering and nosy. To celebrate Neighbours' 25th anniversary, Yahoo conducted a poll to find out who was the viewers' favourite character of all time. Nell came in joint third place alongside Charlene Mitchell. Kate Bevan of The Guardian called Nell a "proto-Dot Cotton" of soap EastEnders.

Neil Wallis and Dave Hogan reviewed Nell in their 1989 book The Neighbours Factfile, commenting: "[She was] never addressed by her Christian name because she is so frosty and disliked by the other residents of Ramsay Street; this gossiping, interfering old busybody is referred to everyone as 'Mrs. Mangel'." Popular culture website TV Cream refer to Nell as "Jane's interfering nan". Soaplife magazine named Nell as one of its "Nightmare Neighbours" and said: "Probably the most unpopular neighbour ever! The original busybody, Nell was always poking her nose into other people's business, ready to phone the police at the merest scent of trouble. Who can forget her long-running feud with Madge, when Madge thought Nell was after her fiancé Harold Bishop. Few tears were shed when she left for a new life in England after marrying John Worthington."

Polly Hudson of the Daily Mirror described the character as "a nosey, spiteful killjoy, hellbent on ruining everyone on Ramsay Street's fun". Hudson thought Nell was somewhat redeemed by her love for Bouncer the dog, saying "there is good in everyone, somewhere, if you look really hard". Paying tribute to the character following her off-screen death, Sarah Ellis of Inside Soap wrote: "For someone who was only on our screens for two years, Mrs Mangel left a legacy to last a lifetime. RIP Mrs M – you will be missed!"

Nell was placed at number seven on the Huffpost's "35 greatest Neighbours characters of all time" feature. Journalist Adam Beresford called her "the mighty Nell Mangel, the greatest busybody to ever twitch a curtain". Beresford likened Nell's values to a "a bygone, almost Victorian" era as she was "constantly aghast" in response to the "rough and ready" local "shenanigans". Beresford noted her infamy as one of the soap opera genre's "greatest comic creations" despite only being on the show for eighteen months. He concluded that it was "astonishing" but a "testament to Mrs Mangel's impact". In 2022, Kate Randall from Heat included Nell in the magazine's top ten Neighbours characters of all time feature. Randall stated: "The street busybody was only in the show for 18 months, but Nell Mangel left a 30-year impression. She was forever falling out with Madge – maybe because she had a mad crush on Harold." A Herald Sun reporter included Nell's departure in its "Neighbours' 30 most memorable moments" feature. It assessed that "Mrs Mangel was one of Neighbours' greatest antagonists".
