= Higher School Certificate (Victoria) =

Former secondary school qualification of Victoria, Australia

The Higher School Certificate, or HSC, was the credential awarded to secondary school students who successfully completed senior high school level studies (years 10, 11 and 12 or equivalent) in the state of Victoria, Australia. In 1987, there was a trial of its successor, the Victorian Certificate of Education. In 1992, the HSC was discontinued.
