= Rachel Friend =

Australian actress and journalist (born 1970)

- Born: 8 January 1970 (age 56); Australia
- Occupations: Actress, journalist, communications consultant
- Years active: 1985–present
- Spouse(s): Craig McLachlan (m. 1993–1994) Stuart MacGill (m. 2000–2013)
- Children: 2

Rachel Amanda Friend (born 8 January 1970) is an Australian actress and journalist.

== Early life ==
Friend was born on 8 January 1970. She has an older brother and a younger sister. She completed her HSC at Sacré Cœur School, in Melbourne's eastern suburbs, and deferred a commerce course at University of Melbourne.

== Career ==
Friend began her screen career with roles in Zoo Family, Prime Time and The Bartons. She also starred in the 1986 family adventure film Frog Dreaming.

Friend joined the cast of the soap opera Neighbours in 1988, when she was eighteen. Friend chose to postpone her university degree to join the show as Bronwyn Davies. Friend quit Neighbours in 1990. That same year saw her win the Logie Award for Most Popular Actress.

After leaving Neighbours, Friend starred as Annette in the telemovie Mission Top Secret, alongside Beth Buchanan. Other roles include Golden Fiddles (1991), and a brief appearance in Round The Twist as a mermaid.

Friend then moved into TV journalism. In 1991, she became a reporter for Midday with Ray Martin. She was a reporter for A Current Affair for seven years, until her departure in 2001. Friend co-hosted the Seven Network show Saturday Kitchen with her husband Stuart MacGill.

In 2003, Friend established her own PR agency, Media Friendly. In July 2007, she produced and presented the Seven Network parenting show, Mums and Bubs. In 2009, Friend began hosting a television show on the Seven Network called New Idea TV alongside Barbara Northwood, Tom Williams and a variety of other presenters.

== Personal life ==
In 1993, Friend married Australian actor-singer Craig McLachlan whom she had met on the set of Neighbours. They divorced the following year. McLachlan's hit song "Amanda" was about Friend, which is her middle name.

Friend married Australian cricketer Stuart MacGill in Melbourne in October 2000, after meeting in 1999 when she interviewed him for A Current Affair. They have two children together – a son born in 2003 and a daughter born in 2006. The pair separated and subsequently divorced in 2013.

== Filmography ==
Year	Title	Role	Notes
1985	Zoo Family	Susie's friend	Episode: "The Good, The Bad and Martin"
1986	Frog Dreaming	Wendy	aka The Quest (US) and The Go Kids (UK)
1986	Prime Time		
1988	The Bartons	Miranda	Episode: "Bartons on the Beach"
1988–1990	Neighbours	Bronwyn Davies	Series regular
	Round The Twist	Mermaid	
1991	Golden Fiddles	Kitty Balfour	Miniseries
1991	Midday	Reporter	
1992	Mission Top Secret	Annette	TV movie / pilot
1993	London Tonight	Reporter	
1996	Wild Life	Presenter	Also writer
1999	A Current Affair	Reporter	
	Saturday Kitchen	Co-host (with husband Stuart MacGill)	
2001	A Current Affair	Reporter	Episode: "Vaccination: A Stab in the Dark?"
2005	Under the Grandstand	Guest	Episode: #1.4
2007	Mums and Bubs	Presenter	Also producer
2009	New Idea TV	Host	
2018	The Go Kids: Looking Back on Frog Dreaming	Self	TV special (short)

== Awards and nominations ==
Year	Association	Category	Work	Result	Ref
1989	Logie Awards	Most Popular New Talent	Neighbours	Nominated	
1990	Logie Awards	Most Popular Actress	Neighbours	Won	
1992	Logie Awards	Most Popular Actress in a Telemovie or Miniseries	Golden Fiddles	Nominated	
