= Vivean Gray =

English actress (1924–2016)

- Born: Jean Vivra Gray; 20 July 1924; Cleethorpes, Lincolnshire, England
- Died: 29 July 2016 (aged 92); Shoreham-by-Sea, West Sussex, England
- Other names: Vivian Gray, Viven Gray (credited as)
- Occupation: Actress
- Years active: 1952–1988
- Known for: Neighbours (TV series) as Nell Mangel; The Sullivans (TV series) as Ida Jessup; Prisoner (TV series) as Edna Pearson
- Parent(s): Allan and Doris Gray

Jean Vivra Gray (20 July 1924 – 29 July 2016), known professionally as Vivean Gray, also credited as Vivian Gray and Viven Gray, was an English actress who starred in films and television series in Australia.

Gray starred in films Picnic at Hanging Rock and The Last Wave, but her best-known roles were in TV soap operas, after having appeared in numerous guest parts for Crawford Productions, she had regular roles in serials, The Sullivans, as Ida Jessup appearing in that series for its entire run from 1976 to 1983; in Prisoner, as Edna Pearson in 1984, and in Neighbours, as Nell Mangel from 1986 to 1988, after which she left the acting profession and returned to her native England to Shoreham-by-Sea, West Sussex.

== Early life ==
Gray was born in Cleethorpes, Lincolnshire, England on 20 July 1924. the daughter of Allan Gray and Doris (nee Simpson), who had married the previous year in Grimsby, Lincolnshire. She was the eldest of four children. Her father was a fish and chip shop owner at Grimsby Docks, and, just before WW2, the family moved to New Malden in Surrey where he owned the newly built Fish and Chip shop at 12, The Triangle.

Gray prior to her acting career initially worked as a local reporter, photographer's assistant, a sales assistant in a department store, and later became a nurse, and served with the Women's Land Army. In 1952 she visited Australia on holiday. Her acting career stemmed from work with an amateur theatrical group.

== Career ==
Gray's first screen appearance was as an unnamed, interfering and gossipy neighbour in the 1971 film A City's Child. Soon afterwards, Gray began appearing in a number of television dramas produced by Crawford Productions including The Box, Solo One, Bluey, Homicide, Division 4, Matlock Police, and Carson's Law. She also appeared in film portraying mathematics teacher Miss Greta McCraw in Peter Weir's adaptation of Picnic at Hanging Rock (1975) and in the television mini-series Anzacs and All the Rivers Run.

She worked with Weir again in 1977 in his film The Last Wave, playing the role of Aboriginal history expert Doctor Whitburn.

=== The Box ===
Gray played Gwen Logan in The Box in 1975. Appearing in the show weeks before her daughter, thus building some suspense, Gwen is the mother of Carol Manning (Barbara Ramsay), the troubled wife of Nick Manning (John Stanton). Carol has a history of mental illness, exacerbated by her mother's interfering and undermining presence. Additionally, Gwen has a problem with alcohol. In a fraught storyline, Gwen persuades Carol to undergo an abortion without Nick's knowledge; Carol changes her mind at the last minute.

=== The Sullivans ===
Gray played Ida Jessop in the soap opera The Sullivans for its 16-season run from 1976 to 1983, winning two Logie Awards for her portrayal of the gossipy neighbour.

=== Prisoner ===
She appeared in serial Prisoner (known internationally as Prisoner: Cell Block H), as genteel poisoner Edna Pearson in 1984, in a seven-episode arc. After the initial showing of her episodes in Australia, a woman from South Australia named Emily Gertrude Phyllis Perry claimed the story was based on her real life experience of being accused of poisoning her husband Kenneth Warwick Henry Perry, by putting small doses of arsenic in his food and threatened to sue the producers, Grundy Television stating defamation.

Perry became the central figure in allegations by the Crown that she attempted to poison her husband, during a trial lasting 72 days in 1981, her husband had also maintained that his wife was innocent during the trial, however Perry was initially sentenced to serve 15 years, but the following year the decision was overturned by the High Court, and the Government did not seek a retrial. Grundy's had stated in media reports the story line was actually based on a 1953 case and not the Perry case. She subsequently decided not to sue the company, despite the story bearing many similarities to her case, even down to the character's initials.

As a result, any material that coincided with the woman's story was removed for subsequent episode screenings, including the full Australian DVD release of Prisoner. In 2010 a special DVD release of the full uncut "Edna" story was released, but only in the United Kingdom.

=== Neighbours ===
In 1986, Gray was cast for three weeks in the role of busybody "Nell" Mangel, better known as Mrs Mangel in the soap opera Neighbours. However, the character proved so popular that she remained on the show until 1988, appearing in 292 episodes. The character was known for her constant feuding with Madge Bishop, played by Anne Charleston, and vying for the affections of Harold Bishop, played by Ian Smith. Gray left the role after receiving abuse from fans who disliked the character, with producers relocating Mangel to St. Albans, with a retired dentist, to live a happy retirement. This was Gray's last acting role and she retired, returning to her native land and settling in Shoreham-by-Sea, West Sussex. In the soap’s later years, Gray still had an onscreen presence as the painting of Mrs Mangel was put back on display in the character’s home. For the show’s final weeks in 2022, old scenes and photos included Gray as Nell. In the UK, the last three episodes, which contained Gray in a flashback, aired on the 6th anniversary of her death (29 July 2022).

=== Later life and recognition ===
Gray won two Logie Awards for her role as Ida Jessup in The Sullivans: in 1978 for Best Sustained Performance by an Actress in a Supporting Role, and in 1981 for Best Support Actress in a Series. In 1995, Gray was featured on an Australian postage stamp, depicting her role in Picnic at Hanging Rock.

== Death ==
Gray died on 29 July 2016, aged 92. She never married or had any children.

== Filmography ==
=== Film ===
Year	Film	Role	Type
1971	A City's Child	First Neighbour	Feature film
1973	Libido	Elderly nun (segment "The Priest")	Feature film
1975	The Great Macarthy	Mrs Thompson	Feature film
1975	Picnic at Hanging Rock	Miss Greta McCraw	Feature film
1977	The Last Wave	Dr Whitburn	Feature film
1989	Come and Get It	Saturday (as Vivien Gray)	Feature film

=== Television ===
Year	Film	Role	Type
1969–1974	Homicide	Brigitte Solerno / Irene King / Jean Jackson / Shop Customer / Hilda Mercer / Grace Marshall	TV series, 6 episodes
1970–1975	Division 4	Mrs Badger / Phyllis Read / Helen Anderson / Ida Green / Diane Andrews / Mrs Greer / Miss. Parsons / Carmel Adams / Emily Adams / Mrs Liscard / Spinster	TV series, 11 episodes
1967–1972	Adventure Island	Mother Sparkle / Mother’s Tinkle	TV series
1972–1976	Matlock Police	Gwen Bracegirdle / Mrs Hill / Mrs Evans	TV series, 3 episodes
1974	This Love Affair	Mrs Gibson	TV series, 1 episode
1975	Lucky Colour Blue		TV series
1976	Power Without Glory	Jane	TV series, 1 episode
1976	Bluey	Mrs Jenkins	TV series, episode 10: And Then There Were None
1976	Solo One	Mrs Jupp	TV series, 1 episode 9: The Man From Happy Valley
1976–1981	The Sullivans	Mrs Ida Jessup	TV series, 885 episodes
1978	The 20th Annual TV Week Logie Awards	Herself	TV special
1983	All The Rivers Run	Alicia Raeburn	TV miniseries, 2 episodes
1984	Prisoner	Edna Pearson	TV series, 6 episodes
1984	Carson's Law	Mrs Garrick	TV series, 1 episode
1985	Anzacs	Matron	TV miniseries, 2 episodes
1986–1988	Neighbours	Nell Mangel	TV series, 260 episodes
