= Boyd Hoyland =

- Neighbours character
- Portrayed by: Kyal Marsh
- Duration: 2002–2007
- First appearance: 5 June 2002
- Last appearance: 3 August 2007
- Introduced by: Stanley Walsh
In-universe information
- Occupation: Student; Carpenter's Mechanics employee; Gym assistant; Medical student; Barman
- Father: Max Hoyland
- Mother: Claire Hoyland
- Stepmother: Stephanie Scully
- Sisters: Summer Hoyland
- Half-brothers: Charlie Hoyland
- Wife: Janae Timmins (2006–2007)
- Grandfathers: Bobby Hoyland; Joe Scully (step)
- Grandmothers: Rosie Hoyland; Lyn Scully (step)
- Uncles: Colin Barclay
- Aunts: Izzy Hoyland
- First cousins: Holly Hoyland

Boyd Hoyland is a fictional character from the Australian soap opera Neighbours, played by Kyal Marsh. He made his first on-screen appearance on 5 June 2002. In 2007, Marsh quit the serial and his character departed on 3 August 2007 along with Stephanie McIntosh's character Sky.

== Casting ==
Marsh joined the cast of Neighbours as Boyd when he was fourteen. On 28 January 2007, Fiona Byrne of the Herald Sun reported Marsh would be leaving Neighbours. Producers did not renew Marsh's contract. The actor confirmed the news in March 2007 and he revealed that he would be shooting his final scenes a few weeks later. He added that Boyd was to leave "on good terms and with a woman he is meant to be with". Marsh told Will Martin from LastBroadcast that he was both sad and excited to leave Neighbours, explaining "I am going to miss everyone and the lifestyle I had working on Neighbours, but the excitement of starting a new life and adventure overrides the sad things."

== Development ==
The serial's official website describe Boyd, stating: "Clearly, for a man working his way through medical school at a rapid pace, Boyd is extremely intelligent. When he first arrived in Ramsay Street he was something of a child genius and was placed in an accelerated learning programme at Erinsborough High. He compensated for being younger than his classmates by cultivating an attitude, determined not to be seen as a nerd." They also state that his stubbornness has led to several confrontations with his "equally obstinate dad". Boyd also has a big sense of responsibility, which led to a doomed relationship with Kayla Thomas (Virginia Ryan). Boyd and his family have been portrayed as generally close and loving.

In 2005, Boyd was diagnosed with adolescent schizophrenia. Following some erratic behaviour, Boyd becomes "terrified" that he has the condition. His diagnosis comes about after he mentions to his sister, Summer (Marisa Siketa), that he has arranged to meet their mother. Marsh told Inside Soap's Jason Herbison that Summer "freaks out" because their mother has been dead for years and when she tries to tell Boyd this, he does not listen. Summer becomes concerned and she follows Boyd into the bush, where he believes their mother is waiting. She begs him to stop and insists their mother is dead. Boyd becomes confused and when he realises she is right, it is upsetting for him. Marsh said "it's like he has to deal with her death all over again." Summer gets her brother to the hospital, where he is diagnosed as being in the early stages of adolescent schizophrenia. Of how his character is feeling, Marsh explained "Boyd freaks out, because this is what he has been afraid of all along." Boyd's stepmother Stephanie Scully (Carla Bonner) is then forced to have him committed to a psychiatric ward. Marsh revealed that he relished the challenging storyline and he did much research beforehand. He used the internet and spoke to a relative who has the condition. The actor added "All those things gave me an idea for what it would be like, and I'm enjoying the storyline." Marsh later commented that the storyline had been one of his favourites.

Boyd marries Janae Timmins (Eliza Taylor-Cotter), but he later has an affair with fellow character Glenn Forrest (Cleopatra Coleman), which ruins his relationship with Janae. Behind the scenes Marsh was furious over the storyline and criticised the producers and branded it as "stupid", also stating: "I absolutely hated my character at the end. I couldn't believe what they made me do, I thought it was a stupid storyline and I copped a lot of flack over it. I was really upset." He also felt that after the storyline it was the right time for Boyd to leave.

== Storylines ==
Boyd is the eldest child of Claire and Max Hoyland (Stephen Lovatt) and brother to Summer (Marissa Siketa). Claire died from an undiagnosed heart condition and Max left the children with their grandmother Rosie (Maggie Millar), while he worked on oil rigs in East Timor.

Boyd transfers to Erinsborough High from Eden Hills Grammar and is placed into Year 10 as part of the accelerated learning programme, despite him being a year younger. Boyd struggles socially and Libby Kennedy (Kym Valentine) gives him some extra tuition. Boyd develops a crush on Libby. Boyd befriends Saxon Garvey (Troy Lovett), whose mother had recently died. Saxon later decides to go live with his father in Sydney. Max arrives in Erinsborough and Max encourages him to take part in the local cricket team. Max becomes friends with the team captain, Adam Stevens (Nicholas Colla) and Boyd wants his father to be impressed with him too.

Boyd spends a few weeks at a camp for gifted children and he returns with a girlfriend, Heather Green (Megan Harrington). Heather brings trouble for Boyd and he is grounded after sneaking out to see her. Boyd brags to friends at school about Heather. He shares his first kiss with her, but she finds out about his bragging and dumps him. Boyd tries to win Heather back by stealing a street sign. Max catches him and Boyd gets a friend to make him one instead. Heather likes the gesture and Boyd convinces her to go to Susan (Jackie Woodburne) and Karl Kennedy's (Alan Fletcher) wedding.

Boyd's friend, Daniel Clohesy (Thomas Blackburne) tells Boyd that his father has been hitting him. Max agrees to let Daniel stay with them. Daniel and Boyd get into mischief by looking in the bathroom window of Number 26, to see the Scully sisters. Max and Joe Scully (Shane Connor) catch them and they are forced to apologise. Daniel later returns home. Boyd and Heather help Summer when she is bullied on her paper round by Jacinta Martin (Eliza Taylor-Cotter). Boyd is surprised when Rosie announces she is leaving Erinsborough to go to Papua New Guinea. Heather asks Boyd to go to her prom and he is hesitant because he cannot dance.

When Max begins a relationship with Stephanie Scully (Carla Bonner), Boyd expresses his disgust and acts up. Only after Summer threatens to never forgive him, Boyd accepts Max and Steph's relationship. Boyd's behaviour begins to take a downhill slide when he becomes rude to Max and Steph and steals $100 from Max's wallet to by an expensive pair of runners. When Steph finds out, Boyd's animosity grows. His behavior spoils Heather's birthday dinner at Lassiter's when he acts childishly and Heather dumps Boyd. Boyd later opens up to Max about his fears of Steph trying to replace his late mother.

Harold Bishop's (Ian Smith) granddaughter, Sky Mangel (Stephanie McIntosh) arrives in Ramsay Street and Harold encourages her to spend time with Boyd. They become good friends, but Boyd avoids Sky at school because her alternative look makes her unpopular. After Sky confronts him, Boyd kisses her in public and they become a couple. When Sky goes through the emotional trauma of confronting her mother's killer, Boyd offers his support, but he is unable to get through to her. Boyd is relieved when Sky goes back to being her old self.

Max's friend, Gus Cleary (Ben Barrack) comes to stay and he becomes involved with Boyd's aunt, Izzy Hoyland (Natalie Bassingthwaighte). Gus has mental health issues and begins trying to worm his way into the family, which annoys Boyd. Gus and Boyd fight and Gus leaves. He returns several weeks later and begins harassing the family, he is arrested and sectioned. Max marries Steph and Boyd acts as best man.

Boyd takes a job putting up posters and has Stingray Timmins (Ben Nicholas) help him. Unfortunately, they are warned off by older guy, Travis Dean (Adrian Foley). Boyd takes no notice and after he finds out Lana is a lesbian and attracted to Sky, he goes out of his way to prove his masculinity by taking Travis on but ultimately loses. Boyd passes his injuries off as a skateboarding accident, and continues with putting up the posters. Stingray tries to talk Boyd out of it, as Boyd has taken to carrying around a metal bar for protection. During this, Sky blames Boyd for Homophobic graffiti towards on the blackboard at School and dumps him. Boyd punches Travis but it is not the end of the matter, when Travis launches a Molotov cocktail through the kitchen window of Number 32. Boyd tracks Travis down at his address and records a confession, but is discovered by Travis' dog, Satan. Boyd is chased by Travis and his mates and is forced to climb a tree. Police officer Stuart Parker arrives in the nick of time to find Boyd and Travis fighting on the lawn and arrests Travis.

After the Travis saga, Boyd attempts to reunite with Sky but cannot handle her revelation that Lana kissed her. Boyd later has a brief involvement with Sky's cousin, Serena Bishop but realises he does not care for her in the same way he does Sky. Serena then creates a plan to reunite Sky and Boyd. Several days after Christmas, Gus' body is found in the remains of a fire at Lou's place. Boyd becomes a prime suspect and tries to get Sky and Daniel to cover for him. The charges against him are dropped due to lack of evidence.

Boyd decides to look for work rather than repeat Year 12 after barely passing the previous year. He takes a job at a local gym and becomes obsessive over fitness and body shape to the extent of purging, which alienates him from his friends and family. Boyd later enters a body building contest, but when he sees his opposition, he begins to feel out of his depth. Krystal, Boyd's boss offers him Human growth hormones, which later have an effect on his personality, causing out-of-character behavior.

Boyd begins displaying symptoms of Adolescent Schizophrenia and is sectioned He runs away and Sky finds him, they end up squatting in an abandoned house. Boyd collapses and is rushed to hospital, where it is discovered that he has a brain tumour. Boyd is left in a coma for several weeks after the removal of the tumor. Boyd wakes up when his grandfather, Bobby visits him. Boyd recovers and returns home. He finds out that not only has Sky kissed Dylan, but he revealed his kiss with Serena. Boyd and Sky split up, but agree to be friends.

Kayla Thomas, a homeless single mother begins staying with the Hoylands and intends to give her baby up to Max and Steph, but Boyd offers to stand by her, even to the extent of moving in with her. After the baby is born, Boyd's relationship with his father and stepmother begins to deteriorate. Anthony, the father of baby Ashley arrives and he and Kayla leave together with Ashley.

Boyd then throws himself into completing Year 12 and achieving the grades he needs to study medicine at University next year. Boyd begins work experience at Karl's surgery during the summer. Boyd begins a relationship with Janae Timmins (Eliza Taylor-Cotter). When Boyd joins Eden Hills university and spends much time with classmate Sasha Hennessy (Eloise Grace), Janae becomes jealous. Boyd dumps Janae, but they are quickly reunited when Janae takes Ned Parker to Erinsborough High's ball. Boyd proposes to Janae and they marry in secret. Max is annoyed when he discovers Janae lied about her age and the marriage is not legally valid, but Boyd does not care and he and Janae move in with Toadie at Number 30.

One night while working at the Scarlet Bar, Boyd is forced to eject a drunken woman, Sally Herbert, unaware that she is his new lecturer at University. After discovering this, Boyd tries to resolve things but Sally is unmoved and begins to criticize Boyd over everything he does. When a vial of morphine is found in Sally's bag, she threatens Boyd with the destruction of his career and later plants it on him. During a locker search, Boyd acts quickly and pins the vial on Katya Kinski. When Katya faces being fired, Boyd confesses.

When Max goes missing, Boyd goes looking for him. When Boyd returns without Max, he is noticeably distracted and admits to Janae he kissed someone else while in Tasmania. The girl, Glenn Forrest, later arrives in Erinsborough and Boyd is forced to choose between her and Janae. Boyd chooses Glenn and Janae moves out and Boyd is beaten up by Dylan. Boyd and Glenn split up and Glenn returns to Tasmania.

Max and Steph separate and Steph begins a relationship with Toadie. Boyd feels out of place at home and begins hanging around with Sky again. When spiritualist Terrence Chesterton arrives claiming to be in contact with the recently deceased Stingray, Boyd is skeptical. Around this time the new doctor, Charlotte Stone arrives in Erinsborough and seduces Boyd. Terrence is later killed and Sky is framed for his murder. Boyd realises that Charlotte killed Terrence and he extracts a confession from her. Charlotte is arrested and Sky is released. Boyd and Sky find themselves getting closer, but they agree to stay friends. Sky decides to leave Erinsborough and move to Port Douglas, so that Kerry can be closer to Dylan and Boyd decides to go with her. They leave after a party is thrown for them by their neighbours.

== Reception ==
Media company Virgin Media describe Boyd stating: "As Boyd Hoyland, Kyal was the blue-eyed hunk of Ramsay Street. Over the years Boyd went from studious schoolboy to gym freak." The BBC said that Boyd's most notable moment was "Spying on the Scully girls." Of Boyd's time in the show, Daniel Kilkelly of Digital Spy wrote "Muscleman Boyd became one of Ramsay Street's most popular residents during his early years, but all of that goodwill was eroded when he cheated on his wife Janae towards the end of his time on the show."
