= Janae Timmins =

- Neighbours character
- Portrayed by: Eliza Taylor-Cotter
- Duration: 2005–2008
- First appearance: 4 April 2005
- Last appearance: 8 February 2008
- Introduced by: Ric Pellizzeri
In-universe information
- Other names: Janae Hoyland (married name)
- Occupation: Student; Mechanic; Boxer
- Father: Kim Timmins
- Mother: Janelle Timmins
- Brothers: Dwayne Timmins; Brandon Timmins; Dylan Timmins; Stingray Timmins
- Sisters: Anne Baxter; Bree Timmins; Pepper Steiger (step)
- Husband: Boyd Hoyland (2006–07)
- Grandmothers: Loris Timmins
- Uncles: Kevin Rebecchi
- Nieces: Kerry Mangel
- First cousins: Toadie Rebecchi; Stonefish Rebecchi

Janae Timmins (also Hoyland) is a fictional character from the Australian soap opera Neighbours, played by Eliza Taylor-Cotter. She made her first screen appearance during the episode broadcast on 4 April 2005. The character was created by executive producer Ric Pellizzeri as part of the new Timmins family, joining the established character Stingray Timmins (Ben Nicholas). Janae is characterised as a feisty character who is unafraid of physical confrontation. She has low self-esteem due to her father Kim Timmins (Brett Swain) being absent during her childhood. Janae is featured in various storylines including having her drink spiked with rohypnol, an HIV scare and the victim of an attempted sexual assault.

Janae has also been the subject of an underage marriage with fellow character Boyd Hoyland (Kyal Marsh). Their marital life is short-lived when Boyd is unfaithful. Marsh bemoaned the development and branded it "a stupid storyline". Her failed marriage changed Janae into a man-hater. Producers then paired her with Ned Parker (Daniel O'Connor) and formed a new family unit as they cared for his son Mickey Gannon (Fletcher O'Leary). The character's failed marriage continued to shape the character as she kisses Darren Stark (Todd MacDonald). The actress called it an act of self-sabotage to prevent Ned from hurting her as Boyd did. With her relationship with Ned also failed she decides to leave Erinsborough to live with her mother.

In 2007 Taylor-Cotter's on-screen family were axed, however, Pellizzeri decided to keep Janae in the serial. After three years in the role, Taylor-Cotter decided to leave because the show had changed following the departure of her on-screen family. The actress filmed her final scenes in September 2007. The character made her final appearance in the show on 8 February 2008. Janae has been described as a "rebel and a troublemaker" by certain critics and on-screen she has matured from a troubled teenager into a young woman. Taylor-Cotter has also been praised for the role and has been nominated for a number of awards for her portrayal.

== Casting ==
Actress Eliza Morley secured the role of Janae after previously appearing in a guest role in 2003. Taylor-Cotter had originally auditioned for the role of Lana Crawford, however, it was actress Bridget Neval who was eventually cast.

== Character development ==
=== Characterisation ===
Cotter described Janae as being "a very troubled young girl in constant need of attention." She has a promiscuous and tough persona. Comparing Janae to her younger sister, she said "Janae and Bee are very different from one another, and Janae especially has a knack for getting into trouble." Shortly after their arrival in Erinsborough, Janae and Bree Timmins (Sianoa Smit-McPhee) shoplift some items from the general store, which Cotter said was an indication of what kind of girls they are. Their brother Stingray Timmins (Ben Nicholas) is annoyed by their actions, but Janae thinks he has gone soft. Cotter added that she enjoyed playing Janae, as she is vastly different from herself.

A writer from Network Ten described Janae as a younger version of her mum Janelle, but noted Janae would hate any comparison being made. They added that she is "keen not to make the same mistakes", but she is married at sixteen and history is repeating itself. The character developed a "complicated attitude" towards men – "she knows how to stick up for herself and isn't afraid to get physical if necessary." In her early scenes, Janae used sex to get attention and affection from others. But underneath it is her father's disappearance that affected her self-esteem.

=== HIV scare ===
Writers used Janae to portray the issue lead topic of HIV. The storyline features Janae discovering that her ex-boyfriend Mike Pill (Alexander Cappelli) carries the virus, forcing Janae to be tested. Taylor-Cotter told the BBC that she had heard rumours about the storyline a number of months beforehand. She also had "mixed feelings" about the storyline because she worried that Janae might have been written out of the series. Taylor-Cotter found the issue challenging, very emotional and daunting because she had to put herself in Janae's situation. While Taylor-Cotter had previously difficulty crying on cue - she found it "pretty easy" because she felt sorry for Janae. Taylor-Cotter was pleased that Neighbours had chosen to portray an issue-led storyline. She stated; "I don't think there's enough publicity surrounding HIV, it's a very serious disease and there are so many people out there suffering from it. I think there should be a lot more awareness about it."

Janae is characterised as not being "very good at rational thinking" so she attempts to end her relationship with Boyd Hoyland (Kyal Marsh), in order to protect him. Taylor-Cotter revealed that she was thankful that Boyd "sees straight through it" and agrees to support her. Janae also confides in her younger sister Bree but is reluctant to tell anyone else. Janae "approaches it the best way she knows how and that's by pushing everyone that cares about her away." Taylor-Cotter told Inside Soap that Janae cannot tell Janelle about her situation because "she fears she'll judge her". The truth is revealed during an argument between the pair. Taylor-Cotter and Feeney got on so well off-screen, that they purposely avoided each other while on set to add to the "intensity" of the scenes. Janae is "so afraid of taking after her mother" that she blames Janelle for her predicament, telling her that she is at fault if she is HIV positive. Janelle is upset that Janae could not confide in her about an "important matter". Taylor-Cotter said that Janae ends up receiving support from her family because "the Timmins clan always reunite in the end".

=== Marriage to Boyd Hoyland ===
Producers created Janae's first romantic partnership alongside Boyd. Their relationship was developed fast and the two characters decide to get married. However their families are not happy with their engagement for various reasons. Writers set up the opposing relatives warring against either side. Boyd's father Max Hoyland (Stephen Lovatt) does not approve because of their young age. Marsh told an Inside Soap reporter that the engagement causes tension between the Timmins and Hoylands because Max thinks Janae is not good enough for his son. Janae's mother Janelle Timmins (Nell Feeney) is undecided and sometimes supports them but sometimes turns against them. With so much opposition the duo fear no one will attend their wedding. Marsh explained that Janae and Boyd do not want to risk any more problems they decide to marry in a small registry office ceremony. Boyd's sister Summer Hoyland (Marissa Siketa) supports her brother but she tells Max and Janelle about the wedding. Their relatives arrive unannounced at the wedding, Marsh described the scenes as "a lot of trouble". The actor believed the wedding was very low-key and filming the event felt like a normal day on set. The pair do not wear traditional wedding attire and Marsh did not think it made their marriage look official.

Boyd later has an affair with Glenn Forrest (Cleopatra Coleman) while holidaying in Tasmania. He feels guilty and tells Janae that he kissed Glenn who forgives him. Glenn arrives in Erinsborough to visit her friend Elle Robinson (Pippa Black) and Boyd. Marsh told Jason Herbison from Inside Soap that "Glenn's like a skeleton in Boyd's closet who's coming back to haunt him." Her arrival reminds him of the fun they shared. Despite their affair lasting two weeks, Glenn is in love with Boyd and he denies any reciprocation. She visits Boyd and he tells her that he is not interested and wants Janae. This prompts Glenn to reveal the full extent of their affair to Janae. She offers Boyd the opportunity to confess. Marsh assessed that Janae is left "heartbroken" by Boyd's betrayal and he is scared of losing her.

Elle decides to convince Glenn to remain in Erinsborough to steal Boyd from Janae. Marsh explained that Elle hates Janae and uses Glenn to enact her revenge against the Hoylands. But as the actor noted, Janae is characterised as a fiery female, a trait shared with all her family members. Writers used her "Timmins spirit" to spur Janae on into fighting mode to save her marriage. Marsh added, "Janae's not the kind of girl to take things lying down, so she goes into battle." Janae slaps Glenn for sleeping with her husband. But the situation develops into a "very nasty" predicament when Glenn is run over and suspicion is cast over Janae believing she caused the accident. Behind the scenes Marsh was furious with Boyd's infidelity and criticised the producers for their "stupid" storyline. He told a reporter "I absolutely hated my character at the end. I couldn't believe what they made me do, I thought it was a stupid storyline and I copped a lot of flack over it. I was really upset."

=== Relationship with Ned Parker ===
Producers later decided to pair Janae with Ned Parker (Daniel O'Connor). Writers were tasked with creating reasons for them to share screen time together. So Janae hires Ned as her personal boxing trainer and he helps her with a fitness regime. Ned soon develops feelings for Janae but she shows no interest in him. Taylor-Cotter described the dynamic between Janae and Ned as a "love-hate relationship". There had been tension between the pair ever since he began training her. The actress believed the breakdown Janae and Boyd's marriage caused her character to become "very anti-men". When Boyd begins his recovery from a car accident, Janae gives him a friendly hug. Ned witnesses this and presumes they are going to reconcile. Ned forces Janae to undertake more intensive training to prevent her from thinking about Boyd. He takes her to the beach and orders her to run and swim. But his fitness regime causes Janae to become exhausted while in the sea and she nearly drowns. Taylor-Cotter explained it was the first moment Janae views Ned romantically. Concerned Ned wants to rescue her and they share a "weird moment" where Ned feels the urge to kiss Janae. Taylor-Cotter explained "she freaks out, so Ned backs off and pretends that it was nothing. But surprisingly, she feels a little gutted - and starts to realise that she's attracted to Ned." But unlike Janae and Boyd's romance, writers decided on a "slow-burning" relationship. The actress believed that Janae rushed her into marriage with Boyd and it subsequently failed. So to make Janae and Ned more successful they fall in love over a greater amount of time.

Ned's ex-girlfriend, Kirsten Gannon (Nikola Dubois), attempts to steal him away from Janae. Ned and Kirsten travel to Oakey for a reunion and Janae cannot make it. O'Connor said that Janae is "concerned" about leaving Ned alone with Kirsten because she believes they have feelings for each other. Ned is constantly reassuring Janae that nothing is going on, but Janae is aware that Kirsten is manipulative while Ned remains "oblivious". Janae follows the pair to the reunion and causes an argument. O'Connor said that Janae behaves "totally over-the-top and embarrasses Ned". He opined that Ned ultimately views Janae as "a bit of a loose cannon".

Kirsten takes a break away from Erinsborough but returns to regain custody of her son Mickey Gannon (Fletcher O'Leary). But Janae and Ned had cared for Mickey and created their own family unit. With Kirsten proving that she can be a trusted parent it becomes increasingly difficult for Janae to deal with. Taylor-Cotter told Herbison that "Janae doesn't trust Kirsten as far as she could throw her." Janae found it easier to deal with Kirsten when she was acting a bad mother but now she has "cleaned up her act". The actress believed that is made her "twice as dangerous" and she poses a risk to Janae's new-found family. Writers played Kirsten as a "meddling minx" and her involvement continues to create problems. She is delighted when Janae and Ned argue. He decides to let Kirsten collect Mickey from school and fails to notify Janae. When she witnesses Kirsten taking Mickey she reports her to police for kidnap. The mistake creates more drama for the couple and Taylor-Cotter believed it was exactly what Kirsten wanted to achieve. But it was Mickey who suffered the most being caught up between two sides trying to keep custody of him. She added that the fight for Mickey would turn nasty.

Taylor-Cotter warned that infidelity would cause trouble for her character. Janae was later revealed as the culprit when she kisses Darren Stark (Todd MacDonald). It leads to the breakdown of his relationship with Libby Kennedy (Kym Valentine). Dan Bennet from Network Ten announced that the kiss would be exposed and added "Kirsten saw it all and being the vindictive ex that she is, she'll make Janae's life hell. The relationship between Janae & Ned is very much tested after her kiss." The actress has defended her character stating it was a "spur-of-the-moment thing" that they both regretted. Their mistake was not being honest after it happened and lying. Kirsten uses the situation to her advantage and blackmails Janae. But she decides to tell Ned the truth. He is understanding and forgives her. Janae then tries to convince Darren to tell Libby but he refuses. She shouts at him which is overheard by her neighbours. The public humiliation plays on Ned's mind and he questions whether he has actually forgiven Janae. The uncertainty of her relationship status is a "horrible feeling" for Janae and she decides to move out. Taylor-Cotter believed the storyline came about due to Janae's past with Boyd. She added that her marriage ended because Boyd betrayed her - "so I think Janae's subconsciously trying her best to ruin things with Ned before he has the chance to break her heart, too." Janae is sad to witness the hurt she causes Libby's son Ben Kirk (Blake O'Leary) so decides to leave.

=== Departure ===
"Janae needs to be on her own for a bit - she's only 18, and is far too young to be tied down or playing stepmum to anyone's kid. When I look at what she's been through, I think 'Wow, most people don't experience that in a lifetime!'"

— Eliza Taylor-Cotter on Janae's departure. (2008)

In 2007 Nell Feeney and Sianoa Smit-McPhee, who play Janae's mother Janelle and sister Bree Timmins, were axed by executive producer Ric Pellizzeri. He wanted Janae to remain in the show and kept Taylor-Cotter in contract. But that year Taylor-Cotter decided to leave Neighbours to pursue other projects and move her career to America. The Timmins family being written out of the show was a factor in the actress' decision to leave. Their departure made her experience too different. She explained, "it just didn’t feel like the family that I joined when I started three years ago." Taylor-Cotter finished filming her final studio scenes on 28 September 2007 and received a goodbye gathering from cast and crew. On-screen Janae's exit played out following the fall-out from her kiss with Darren. Bennett revealed that writers had planned an emotional exit for Janae and viewers would need tissues as it was likely to upset them.

The character's exit plays out following a series of arguments between residents. It brings Janae to the realisation people will be better off without her. Mickey and Ben fight over whether it was Janae or Darren to blame for the kiss. She explains that she initiated the kiss and they should blame her. But Ned is angry that Janae has discussed the issue with the children believing they are too young to deal with such an adult issue. Knowing the trouble she has caused for Ned, Libby, Mickey and Ben she arranges to live in Cairns with Janelle. Taylor-Cotter explained that her character needed to sort her life out away from Erinsborough. She believed it was for the greater good and staying would only hurt her loved ones more. On-screen Ned argues her departure will devastate Mickey but Janae believes a quick exit will help him more. At the airport, Ned and Mickey arrive to say their goodbyes. Taylor-Cotter said it provided closure for the Janae and Ned relationship. She was happy with Janae's final scenes and branded them an "emotional roller-coaster" and fulfilled her wish for Janae to "go out with a bang".

== Storylines ==
Janae grew up in Colac, Victoria and is the daughter of Janelle and Kim Timmins (Brett Swain). Janae and Bree move to Erinsborough to live with Janelle and brothers Dylan (Damien Bodie) and Stingray Timmins (Ben Nicholas). She develops an attraction to Boyd, but loses interest because of his relationship with Sky Mangel (Stephanie McIntosh). Janae dates Mike Pill, who treats her like a possession and allows his friends to try and seduce her. Mike pressures Janae to kiss his friend at a club, but she refuses and walks away from Mike. Janae meets photographer Chris Cousens (Simon Mallory) on her way, who tells her she has the potential to become a model. Chris spikes Janae's drink with rohypnol and attempts to take her home. Janae feels unwell and calls for help from her siblings, who attack Chris and take Janae to the hospital. Janae decides to end her relationship with Mike.

Janae kisses Boyd but he rejects her, Janae turns to the school counsellor, Karl Kennedy (Alan Fletcher). Janae is upset when Karl breaks confidentiality by talking to Stringray. When she overhears Janelle telling Stringray that he is her only child of any worth, Janae leaves home. Janelle convinces Janae to stay, Janae opens up to her about incident with Chris. Janelle is upset that Janae did not feel able to talk to her and decides to make more effort with Janae. She becomes more dependent on Karl as their counselling sessions continue. Karl takes Janae to the theatre and realises that she has an ulterior motive. Karl suggests that they ease the counselling program which upsets Janae. She then admits that she wished he was her father. He tells Janae to contact Kim and take up a new hobby. Janae decides to participate in the basketball team. However, she becomes upset over Karl again and Janelle assumes that she is inappropriately involved with Karl. Janae runs off to Colac leaving Karl under suspicion. While there she discovers details about Kim. Janae returns to clear Karl's name, she begins to date Boyd and Kim returns to reunite with the rest of the Timmins family. Boyd starts working at a clinic and begins to question Janae about her relationship with Mike. Janae breaks into the clinic and reads Mike's file and discovers that he is HIV positive. Janae confides in Bree and Boyd who convince her to take a test. Janae later gets the results of the test which reveal that she does not have HIV.

Janae tells Boyd that she does not want their relationship to be based on sex. Janae becomes jealous when Boyd socialises with other girls on his medicine course. Janae threatens his new friends and becomes obsessed with the idea of having children. Sasha Hennessey (Eliose Grace) tells Boyd that Janae is trying to trap him into marriage, which puts an end to their relationship. Janae discovers that Bree is not Janelle's biological child. Janae reveals the truth about Bree and decides that she does not need anyone else. However, when Boyd proposes to Janae she accepts. Boyd's father Max does not approve but he invites Janae to live with the Hoylands to make her realise the hardship of marriage. When this does not work, Max threatens to disown Boyd and Janelle voices her disapproval. Janae and Boyd decide to elope, Janae provides a fakes birth certificate marries Boyd. Max threatens to inform the police about the certificate and ruins their chances of moving into a flat. Janae finds married life hard, so she Janae takes a job as the hospital's cleaner to see more of Boyd. He does not appreciate her constant attention and is happy when Karl warns her about kissing in the workplace. Janae struggles with school and pays a friends to write her essays. When Susan Kennedy (Jackie Woodburne) learns she is cheating, Janae decides to leave school. Boyd travels to Tasmania in search of Max who has run away. Upon his return he tells Janae that he kissed a girl named Glenn who he saved from drowning; Janae decides to forgive him. Glenn arrives in Erinsborough and Boyd realises that he still has feelings for her. Janae decides to give him time, but he leaves her for Glenn.

Janae starts working for Rex Colt (David Serafin), who tries to sexually assault her. Janae hits Rex to protect herself, and when she escapes she is the one charged with assault. Janae discovers that Ned is responsible for ruining Dylan's relationship with Elle. Janae and Janelle blackmail Ned into becoming their slave. Janae eventually forgives Ned and he soon becomes her boxing coach. Ned's brother Steve Parker (Steve Bastoni) and his family arrive in Erinsborough. After Ned reveals his feelings for her, the two get together. Ned found out that he has a son with previous girlfriend Kirsten. Mickey, is left by Kirsten in Ned's care and Janae decide to help him to look after the child. Ned then moves in with her and so did Mickey. Kirsten returns on a more permanent basis and clashes with Janae, after Kirsten reveals that she still has feelings for Ned. At the Oakey reunion, Kirsten kisses Ned who rejects her. This causes Janae's insecurities to grow. After an argument about the Timmins' house, Janae kisses Darren. Kirsten witnesses the kiss through a window and begins blackmailing Janae. Janae eventually tells Ned, though he forgives her and they attempt to solve their problems. Janae decides it would be for the best if she were to leave and reveals that she is moving to Cairns. Ned follows Janae to the airport where they say good-bye to one another.

== Reception ==
At the 2007 Inside Soap Awards, Taylor-Cotter was nominated in the category of "Best Actress". The following year she was nominated in the "sexiest female" category. Adelaide based newspaper The Advertiser refer to Taylor-Cotter as "making her name playing the Ramsay Street rebel". The Herald Sun state that they found the Timmins family "unappealing" but added that Janae had been made the most of during her duration, and branded Taylor-Cotter a "talented blonde" for her portrayal. British local newspaper the Dorset Echo refer to Janae as a "feisty car mechanic". Fellow cast member Ian Smith who plays Harold in the serial expressed his sadness that the Timmins family were axed. However, he added he was glad Janae had been chosen to stay on stating: "Fortunately, we're still left with Janae, played by Eliza Taylor-Cotter. If you want an actress who's going places, look to her."

Clare Morgan of The Sydney Morning Herald branded Janae as "trashy" and criticised her and Boyd for circling around one another in "excruciating fashion". She added that they should "just go to the school dance together and spare us this high-school-drama emoting." A writer for the Gorey Guardian couldn't work out why Boyd loved Janae, saying that she is usually "a moaning, jealous, pain in the rear." A writer from SYN Media branded Janae an "ever so slightly skanky" character. Herbison from Inside Soap branded Janae "public enemy number one" for kissing Darren. He called her departure "the end of an era". Michelle Rennex from BuzzFeed said "as a heavily troubled teenager, Janae's storylines were often dark and deep." A TVNZ reporter included Janae in their list of the top 30 Neighbours' characters, and stated "Starting out with a bad reputation, Janae eventually softened and won the love of the audience, becoming fondly known as 'the tart with a heart'." Sasha Morris from the Daily Star branded Janae a "rebellious teenager" and a "fan favourite". She added that "Janae won fans over with her rebellious nature and ill-advised romantic endeavour, and her friendships with fellow teens."
