= List of Neighbours characters introduced in 2006 =

The following is a list of characters that first appeared in the Network Ten soap opera Neighbours in 2006, by order of first appearance. They were all introduced by the show's executive producer Ric Pellizzeri. The 22nd season of Neighbours began airing on 9 January 2006. March saw the first birth of 2006, when Charlie Hoyland was born to the established Stephanie Scully and Max Hoyland. That same month saw Paul Robinson's sons Cameron and Robert arrive in town. October saw many arrivals; Rosetta Cammeniti, Will Griggs, Pepper Steiger, Frazer Yeats all arrived on the same day and moved into Ramsay Street. Criminal Guy Sykes came to see Katya Kinski and Kerry Mangel became the second child to be born that year. Pepper's mother, Christine Rodd, was introduced at the end of October and Glenn Forrest arrived in November.

== Charlie Hoyland ==
Charlie Hoyland
- Neighbours character
- Portrayed by: Aaron Aulsebrook-Walker (2006–2008); Jacob Brito (2008–2011); Alexander McGuire (2016–2018); Ryan Corr (dream, 2006)
- Duration: 2006–2011, 2016, 2018
- First appearance: 20 March 2006
- Last appearance: 7 June 2018
- Introduced by: Ric Pellizzeri (2006); Jason Herbison (2016)
In-universe information
- Occupation: Student
- Father: Max Hoyland
- Mother: Stephanie Scully
- Stepmother: Philippa Hoyland
- Half-brothers: Boyd Hoyland; Adam Fitzgerald
- Half-sisters: Summer Hoyland
- Grandfathers: Bobby Hoyland; Joe Scully
- Grandmothers: Rosie Hoyland; Lyn Scully
- Uncles: Jack Scully; Oscar Scully
- Aunts: Izzy Hoyland; Felicity Scully; Michelle Scully
- First cousins: Holly Hoyland
- Other relatives: Tom Scully; Valda Sheergold

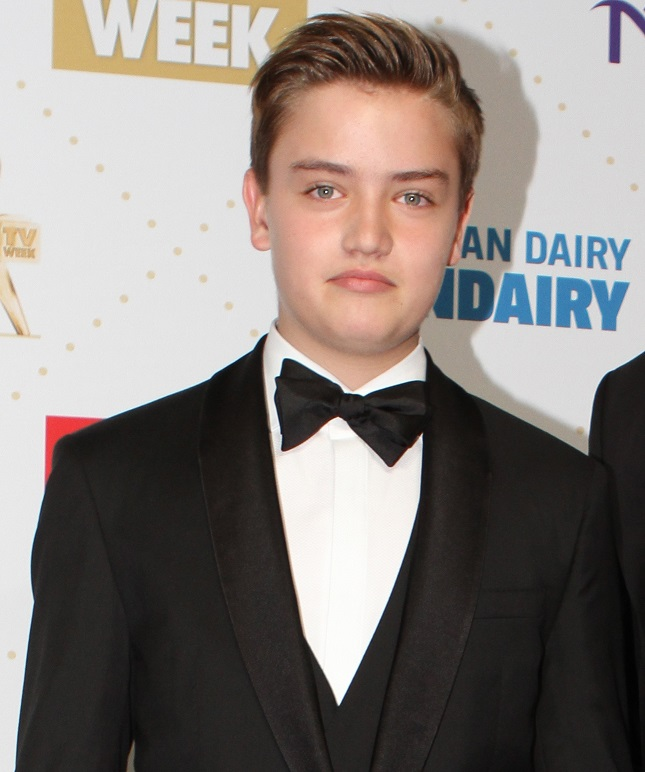
Alexander McGuire began playing Charlie in 2016.

Charlie Hoyland made his first screen appearance on 20 March 2006. He was originally played by Aaron Aulsebrook-Walker, until the part was recast to Jacob Brito in 2008. A Network Ten website writer called Charlie, a "miracle baby". It took Stephanie Scully (Carla Bonner) and Max Hoyland (Stephen Lovatt) months to conceive and during the pregnancy Steph was diagnosed with breast cancer. Steph refused to have treatment until Charlie was born. In October 2010, it was revealed that Charlie was going to be snatched in a storyline, which also saw the return of a character that wanted to cause pain to Steph and Libby Kennedy (Kym Valentine). TV Week said that Charlie would "go missing in mysterious circumstances" and it would leave Steph panicked. The storyline began when Summer Hoyland (Jordy Lucas) and her friends brought Charlie out for Halloween and she took her eye off him. In 2011, Charlie left the show, along with Lyn Scully (Janet Andrewartha).

On 13 October 2015, it was announced that the character would be returning in early 2016, with Alexander McGuire now in the role. McGuire researched his on-screen family and began filming for the guest stint on 16 October. Of joining the show, he commented "It's an amazing first job in the industry. Neighbours has been such a big part of Australian television and has launched so many careers. I'm really excited. It was for a bit of fun when I asked to do a screen test. Now that I have a small role, I feel very lucky to be part of an amazing team." The character returned on 29 May 2018.

When Steph falls pregnant, she is also diagnosed with breast cancer. She refuses to have treatment to protect the baby, causing a rift between her and Max. Their son is born two weeks premature and is named Charlie after Steph's grandfather, Charlie Cassidy (Cliff Ellen). When Izzy Hoyland (Natalie Bassingthwaighte) babysits Charlie, Robert Robinson (Adam Hunter) sneaks into the house and turns on the gas. Izzy passes out, but they are both saved by Lyn Scully. A few months later, Max believes he is losing his mind when Elle Robinson (Pippa Black) launches a revenge plan against him. She snatches Charlie when Max is meant to be looking after him. Max later walks out on his family and leaves town. Steph begins a relationship with Toadfish Rebecchi (Ryan Moloney), giving Charlie a new father figure. When they become engaged, Charlie is one of Toadie's best men. However, the wedding is called off when Steph struggles with her vows. Charlie befriends Ben Kirk (Blake O'Leary). Steph starts dating Jay Duncan (Charlie Clausen) and she and Charlie go away to a cabin with him. Steph realises that Jay started a fatal bush fire, and she tells Charlie to walk back to a fruit stand down the street alone. Toadie and Nicola West (Imogen Bailey) find Charlie by the side of the road and Nicola stays with him, while Toadie saves Steph. Steph decides to concentrate on Charlie for a while.

When Steph takes Charlie to the garage, she is distracted by her new partner Greg Michaels (Nick Farnell) and a cabinet falls on Charlie. He is left without serious injury. Charlie befriends Mickey Gannon (Fletcher O'Leary) and Callum Jones (Morgan Baker). They form a band with Ty Harper's (Dean Geyer) help. Steph becomes pregnant and leaves Erinsborough with Charlie for a while, where she gives birth to his half-brother Adam. Summer and her friends take Charlie trick-or-treating for Halloween and he wanders off. Lucas Fitzgerald (Scott Major) finds Charlie's ghost costume in a car park. Samantha Fitzgerald (Simone Buchanan) finds Charlie and is taking him to Harold's Store when she runs into Steph, Lucas and Lyn. Steph spends as much time as she can with Charlie during her trial for culpable driving. She tells Charlie that she may need to go away for a while and Charlie asks if he can go with her. Steph is sentenced to six years in prison, leaving Charlie in the care of Lyn. Charlie misses his mother. Charlie and Callum bring home a Blue-tongued skink, called Teddy. On his birthday, Lyn tells him that Teddy needs to go back to his owner. Charlie tells Lyn that he hates her and he misses his own party. Jim Dolan (Scott Parameter) returns with Teddy, explaining that his owner did not want Charlie to be upset. While Sophie Ramsay (Kaiya Jones) is babysitting him, Charlie runs away to find Steph. Lyn has Steph moved to a low security prison in Bendigo and she and Charlie leave Erinsborough. When Steph is released from prison, she reveals that Max has full custody of Charlie and that they are living in Fiji.

A few years later, Lyn brings Charlie back to Erinsborough, promising him a surprise. They end up spending the day with Susan Kennedy (Jackie Woodburne). At the Harold's Café, Charlie meets Jimmy Williams (Darcy Tadich), who tells him that he enjoys spending time with Steph, who is living on Ramsay Street. Charlie leaves the café to see Steph. She explains to him that she has been ill and did not want him to see her that way. Steph shows Charlie some letters she wrote to him, but never posted, and he softens towards her. As Lyn prepares to take him back to Bendigo, Charlie promises Steph that he will not tell Max about his visit. Charlie returns a couple of weeks later, having caught the train from Bendigo to come and see Steph. Lyn comes to collect him, and she and Steph let Charlie spend time with Jimmy. When Charlie and Jimmy argue, Steph struggles to tell him off and he runs away when he learns she has been giving Jimmy presents. He watches Steph fix her motorbike and comes back to help her. Shortly after, Charlie's stepmother Philippa Hoyland (Wendy Bos) turns up, having checked on Charlie's phone location while she was in Sydney. She collects Charlie, and is satisfied that Steph did not instigate any of the meetings with him. Steph video calls Charlie, but he tells her he wants to stay in Fiji and that he knows she was sick again. Charlie then ends the call. Philippa and Max later allow Charlie to spend time with Steph. Charlie rejects Steph's gift of a bicycle, and tells Mark Brennan (Scott McGregor) that he is scared as he had a recent bike accident back home. He also voices his concerns about Steph relapsing, after Philippa told him that Steph was ill during mediation. Charlie opens up to Steph and makes a pact not to get stressed about her. Mark arranges for them to spend time in a police car and Charlie decides to try out the bike. He also tells Steph that he approves of Mark becoming her boyfriend. After standing up for Jimmy, who was being teased for his mother's past employment, Charlie is locked in a dumpster by Archie Quill and his friends, and rescued just in time. Charlie returns to live with Max and Philippa in Fiji and Steph decides not to seek custody again.

Two years later, Charlie returns to stay with Steph when Philippa and Max are having marital problems. When Philippa comes to collect Charlie to take him home, it is revealed that she has been having an affair and that she had got Charlie to lie to Max in order to cover it up. Steph suggests that Charlie stays with her whilst Philippa returns to Fiji to sort out her marriage. Steph decides to leave Erinsborough and move to Sydney so she can be close to Adam. Toadie then brings Adam to Erinsborough so Steph can drive up to Sydney in her new camper van with Charlie and Adam for a road trip with her sons. Charlie leaves Erinsborough with his mother and half-brother.

== Cameron Robinson ==
Cameron Robinson
- Neighbours character
- Portrayed by: Adam Hunter
- First appearance: 28 March 2006
- Last appearance: 6 September 2006
- Introduced by: Ric Pellizzeri
In-universe information
- Occupation: Architect
- Family: Robinson
- Father: Paul Robinson
- Mother: Gail Robinson
- Brothers: Robert Robinson
- Sisters: Elle Robinson
- Half-brothers: David Tanaka; Leo Tanaka; Andrew Robinson
- Half-sisters: Amy Williams
- Grandfathers: Jim Robinson; Ian Chadwick; Rob Lewis
- Grandmothers: Anne Robinson; Louise Hampstead; Brenda Lewis

Cameron Robinson, played by Adam Hunter, made his first on-screen appearance on 28 March 2006. Cameron is one of three children (triplets) born to Paul Robinson and Gail Robinson. Ruth Deller of television website, Lowculture, called Cameron "an all-round nice guy (who was bumped off by Max Hoyland, as if we didn't have enough reason to hate that bloke)."

Cameron grew up in Tasmania with Gail (Fiona Corke), his sister Elle (Pippa Black) and identical twin, Robert (Adam Hunter). Cameron developed a close bond with Elle and they made up nicknames for Robert and kept journals about him. Cameron began work in an architects office, before realising that he wanted to train as a nurse. Robert engineered a car crash and Cameron is left in a coma in a small country hospital. Robert then steals Cameron's identity and goes to Erinsborough to carry out a revenge plan against his father, Paul. Cameron wakes from his coma and is unable to understand how he had lost two months of his life. He hides when he hears someone coming and when Robert comes into the room, Cameron knocks him out and steals his clothes. He goes to Ramsay Street and he is arrested for all of Robert's crimes, including planting a bomb in Elle's car and killing three of Paul's neighbours. Cameron remains adamant that he is innocent, while Robert gets into his hospital bed. Cameron pleads with Gail and claims that he had been set up.

Robert pretends to wake from his coma and convinces Paul and Gail that Cameron is the real psycho. The family visit Cameron in jail and he tries to tell them that he had been set up, but they refuse to believe him. Toadfish Rebecchi (Ryan Moloney) is assigned to the case, despite not believing in Cameron's innocence. The police find a shed, set up by Robert, containing diaries and plans in Cameron's name. Katya Kinski (Dichen Lachman) who was dating Robert, but believing him to be Cameron, is certain that the twins were in the wrong places. She talks to Gail and Gail admits to some uncertainties. Robert's plan is uncovered and he runs away, while Cameron is released. During a lunch with Paul, Gail and Izzy Hoyland (Natalie Bassingthwaighte), Cameron starts flirting with Lilly DeRouge (Klara Lisy). However, Paul steals Lilly away from him. Cameron decides to stay in town to help Paul to be a better man. Cameron asks Carmella Cammeniti (Natalie Blair) to speak to Paul and they become friends. Cameron disowns Paul and Elle when he discovers that she has been faking a terminal illness. Cameron offers Katya a lift, at the same time Paul hears that Robert has escaped from the secure unit. Max Hoyland (Stephen Lovatt) calls Katya and she tells him that she is with Cameron, Max believes that Cameron is Robert. When he sees Katya running towards him and Cameron chasing her, as she had forgotten her bag, Max drives into Cameron. At the hospital, Cameron makes Paul promise to be a better person. Cameron is later rushed into surgery, but he does not survive the operation.

== Robert Robinson ==
Robert Robinson
- Neighbours character
- Portrayed by: Adam Hunter
- Duration: 2006–2007, 2019–2020
- First appearance: 28 March 2006
- Last appearance: 6 January 2020
- Introduced by: Ric Pellizzeri (2006); Jason Herbison (2019)
- Spin-off appearances: Neighbours vs Time Travel (2017)
In-universe information
- Other names: Cameron Robinson
- Occupation: Hospital orderly
- Family: Robinson
- Father: Paul Robinson
- Mother: Gail Robinson
- Brothers: Cameron Robinson
- Sisters: Elle Robinson
- Half-brothers: David Tanaka; Leo Tanaka; Andrew Robinson
- Half-sisters: Amy Williams
- Daughters: Harlow Robinson

Robert Robinson, played by Adam Hunter, made his first full appearance on 28 March 2006. The character's initial appearance, credited as "mysterious figure", was portrayed by body double Richard Swanson on 24 October 2005. Robert is one of three children born to Paul Robinson and Gail Robinson. Hunter reprised the role in 2017 for the five-part web series Neighbours vs Time Travel. Hunter reprised the role again two years later and Robert's return scenes aired on 15 July 2019, as Robert agrees to meet his half-brother David Tanaka (Takaya Honda).

Ruth Deller of television website Lowculture, praised Robert, calling him the "best psycho the street had seen since, well, Michael Martin." She added "[He] ran off, hopefully to return and wreak havoc in the future." In late 2007, Deller called for the return of Robert, saying "RobRob [..] must return soon to cause havoc. Particularly if that havoc involves clearing out the cast of some deadwood as it did last time round. Good times." The Daily Mirror named Robert one of the "Top ten most evil soap villains". They said "Behind the chiselled good looks of businessman Paul Robinson's son, lurked the mind of a psycho – one who went to increasingly twisted lengths to slaughter the good people of Erinsborough."

Robert is resentful towards his father for being absent and becomes withdrawn as he grows up. His sister Elle (Pippa Black) and identical twin, Cameron (Hunter) gang up on him and keep him away from their friendship circles. Robert hatches a plan to destroy his father and everyone close to him. The first part of the plan saw him plant a bomb on a plane, which Paul, Elle and other residents use for a joy flight to Tasmania. The plane explodes and kills three of Paul's neighbours. Robert causes a car accident, which leaves Cameron in a coma and Robert goes to Erinsborough as Cameron. Robert decides to target Dylan Timmins (Damien Bodie) and makes sure Paul is left doubting whether Dylan could be trusted. Robert causes some shelves to fall on Elle and Paul sacks Dylan. Robert then turns his attentions to Paul's girlfriend, Izzy Hoyland (Natalie Bassingthwaighte). When she is babysitting her nephew, Charlie (Aaron Aulsebrook-Walker) Robert turns the gas on, causing Izzy to pass out. Izzy and Charlie are saved by Charlie's grandmother, Lyn Scully (Janet Andrewartha) and Robert's plan fails.

Robert gets a job at Erinsborough Hospital and meets Katya Kinski (Dichen Lachman). He struggles as he has had little experience with women, when he and Katya grow close. Robert tells Cameron that he did not think about falling in love and he would have to get rid of her. Robert takes Katya for a picnic, but he saves her when she falls over a cliff, as he does not want her to go. Robert later murders Shawn Dempster (Colin MacPherson), a businessman that Katya, Paul and Izzy knew. Robert flirts with Izzy and records several conversations with her. He patches them together and makes it sound like Izzy had flirted with him. Paul throws Izzy out and Robert breaks up with Katya. Robert plants a bomb in Elle's car and goes to see Cameron, who wakes up and hits him. Paul and Izzy work out who is behind all of the events and they call Elle, who escapes her car. Cameron is arrested for Robert's crimes and Robert pretends he is the one in the coma. Gail (Fiona Corke) then returns to Erinsborough and when Robert sees Paul and Gail kissing, he tells Gail not to get back with Paul.

Robert takes Paul camping and ties him up in a mineshaft. Robert makes the mineshaft collapse on Paul and he heads to Ramsay Street. He kidnaps Katya, drugs her and ties her up in the back of a camper van. Robert hears that Paul and Gail are getting married again and goes to stop the wedding. Robert arrives and shoots Paul, but he is caught by the police. Robert realises that Paul had been wearing a bulletproof vest. Toadfish Rebecchi (Ryan Moloney) visits him, trying to find out what had happened to Connor O'Neill (Patrick Harvey). Robert hides from the staff at the prison, leading them to believe that he had escaped. This leads to Max Hoyland (Stephen Lovatt) killing Cameron by mistake. A few months later, Robert goes to Max's trial and Toadie proves that Robert is still dangerous, when he makes him think he is with Katya. Robert snaps and threatens to make Paul pay.

Twelve years later, Robert's half brother David Tanaka applies to visit him in prison, as part of his studies into psychopathic tendencies. Robert agrees to the visit and is seen by David and his husband Aaron Brennan (Matt Wilson). As Robert is about to speak, Paul appears and Robert abruptly leaves. He subsequently declines any further visitation requests, including that of his daughter Harlow Robinson (Jemma Donovan), whose existence he discovered while in jail. Months later, Robert agrees to meet Harlow. He apologises and tells her that he wants to get to know her better. He learns that Harlow is living with Paul and that he has recently married again. Robert explains that it was a challenge meeting David in person, when Paul showed up. Harlow tells Robert that David is seriously ill and needs a kidney transplant. Robert agrees to get tested and passes the first two tests. He later meets with Paul and his wife Terese Willis (Rebekah Elmaloglou) to tell them that he will donate his kidney if he is moved to a minimum security prison closer to Harlow - Paul agrees. Robert is brought to Erinsborough Hospital and David thanks him for being his donor. However, before the surgery, and with everyone believing he has been sedated, Robert assaults the guard removing his handcuffs and flees the hospital in a stolen ambulance. He drives to the Lassiters Complex and watches Paul, before making his way to Ramsay Street. Robert sees that a heavily pregnant Elly Conway (Jodi Anasta) has recognised him and he forces her inside Number 28, where he holds her at knifepoint and she goes into labour. When Finn Kelly (Rob Mills) hears Elly's screams, he runs inside to help and Robert orders him to deliver the baby. Elly gives birth to a daughter and Robert leaves the house. After stealing a phone, he calls Harlow and asks her to meet him with some money. Robert tells Harlow that he will send for her when he is settled, but she persuades him to return to the hospital and go through with the transplant by promising to visit him every week. After the surgery, Robert is taken back to the prison to recover in the hospital there. Harlow and David later visit him and David expresses his gratitude for what Robert did for him. Robert asks after Elly and then says that what he did was stupid, but he panicked. Paul enters the room and watches on as Harlow and Robert discuss books, before deciding that he wants to talk with Robert alone. Paul asks why Robert came after him, and Robert explains that he just wanted to tell Paul that he was letting go of all the anger towards him for Harlow's sake. Just before he leaves the room, Paul thanks Robert for saving David's life.

== Mishka Schneiderova ==
Mishka Schneiderova
- Neighbours character
- Portrayed by: Deborah Kennedy
- First appearance: 17 April 2006
- Last appearance: 24 November 2006
- Introduced by: Ric Pellizzeri
In-universe information
- Occupation: Boutique Owner; General Store assistant Air Hostess
- Husband: Igor
- Sons: Gregor

Mishka Schneiderova, played by Deborah Kennedy, made her first on-screen appearance on 17 April 2006. Mishka was introduced as a love interest for Lou Carpenter.

Lou Carpenter (Tom Oliver) finds a website advertising Russian brides and gets in touch with a woman named Mishka. Lou arranges for her to fly to Australia and tells Harold Bishop (Ian Smith) and Sky Mangel (Stephanie McIntosh) that they are having a visitor. When Mishka does not turn up at the airport, Lou is convinced that she had seen him and run away. However, Mishka turns up at the house and they both realised that they had lied about their ages. Mishka explains that she had gone to a beauty parlour in Singapore and missed her flight, so she had to get another. Mishka settles in and tells Lou and Harold that she had always dreamed of living in Australia and seeing Shane Warne. Lou takes her to the Zoo and she gives cooks for the household and gives Sky advice. Lou tells Mishka that his business, The General Store, was stolen away from him by Paul Robinson (Stefan Dennis). Mishka and Lou fake a building inspection and the report finds several faults with the building. Paul sells the business back to Lou and Harold, without realising that he had been double-crossed. Lou tries to get Mishka to quit smoking and he asks Karl Kennedy (Alan Fletcher) to hypnotise Mishka. Mishka tells Karl that she has a husband and son back in Russia and Karl encourages her to be honest with Lou. Mishka tells Lou that her husband is a political prisoner and she had to get a fake passport in order to leave Russia, so she is an illegal immigrant.

Mishka settles into the community and becomes a regular at the Russian club. She and Lou begin brewing their own vodka, but after Harold finds out, he tells them to move out. Mishka comes up with a plan to stay, where her friend, Mikhail Irtenev (Christopher Billy), would break in and Lou would catch him and save the day. The plan works, but Mikhail turns up apologising for being late. Mishka and Lou realise that he must have fended off a real burglar. Sky starts complaining about stomach pains and at the hospital, she is told that she is pregnant. Lou and Mishka promise to help her and Mishka goes with Sky to have an abortion. However, Sky changes her mind. Harold lets Mishka and Lou stay and tells them to donate their vodka profits to charity. Mishka is excited when Shane Warne comes to Erinsborough to collect the money. Two men from the Russian Embassy arrive and Mishka is told that she could stay in the country if she went with them to sign some papers. Mishka does not return as she has been kidnapped.

Lou flies to Moscow and Mishka tells him to go home. She pushes him down the stairs to save him from her husband, who had been freed. Lou does not remember much of his trip and he tries to move on from Mishka. However, Mishka turns up after getting a job with a Russian airline and they get back together. Mishka discovers that the airline is cutting the Moscow-Melbourne route and Mishka applies for residency in Australia. They have to convince the officials that they had been a couple for more than two years and invent a back story. However, they decide to be honest and it works, until Mishka tries to give the officer a bribe. Mishka is then taken away and sent back to Russia.

== Anne Baxter ==
Anne Baxter
- Neighbours character
- Portrayed by: Tessa James
- Duration: 2006–2007
- First appearance: 10 August 2006
- Last appearance: 13 July 2007
- Introduced by: Ric Pellizzeri
In-universe information
- Occupation: Student
- Father: Kim Timmins
- Mother: Janelle Timmins
- Adoptive father: Greg Baxter
- Adoptive mother: Brenda Baxter
- Brothers: Dwayne Timmins; Brandon Timmins; Dylan Timmins; Scott Timmins
- Sisters: Janae Timmins; Bree Timmins
- Grandmothers: Loris Timmins

Anne Baxter, played by Tessa James, made her first on-screen appearance on 10 August 2006. Anne is the biological daughter of Kim and Janelle Timmins.

The character of Anne was James' first television role and she said "It was a great first role, I couldn't have wished for anything better. I had to practice a lot and really work hard to get it."

When she was ten, Anne lost her sight to an illness. She struggled to have a relationship with her parents as she felt they could not adapt to having a disabled daughter. Anne overhears her parents talking about Bree Timmins (Sianoa Smit-McPhee) and an ad that she had placed in the paper asking for information on her birth parents. Anne finds out that Bree lives in Erinsborough and was a published author, so she goes to her reading in the park. Anne tells Bree that she is her biggest fan and when people starts to walk out of the reading, Anne defends her. Bree invites Anne back to the Timmins house and when she is getting a CD, Anne feels her way around the room. She is interrupted by Janelle Timmins (Nell Feeney), who tells her to go home. Bree brings Anne home again and Anne gives Janelle a CD. Bree invites Anne for a sleepover and Janelle tells her that she does not know how to behave around a disabled child. They start to bond and Anne is delighted. Janelle accidentally knocks Anne's bag from the table and finds a dictaphone. She listens to it and Anne speaks about getting to know the Timmins family better. Anne catches her and she runs out into the path of Harold Bishop's (Ian Smith) car. Anne explains that it is her way of recording a diary.

Anne tries to steal Bree's boyfriend, Zeke Kinski (Matthew Werkmeister). She grows close to Zeke and Bree becomes uncomfortable. Anne joins Erinsborough High, claiming that she wants to be closer to her new friends. Anne blurts out that Bree had been intercepting letters containing money from her absent father in front of Janelle. Her plan to split Bree and Janelle up fails and Bree stops speaking to her. Zeke takes Anne to the formal instead of Bree, and she tells him that she has not been kissed before. Zeke kisses her and Bree ends their relationship. Janelle tells her that stealing a man from a Timmins girl is the worst betrayal of all. Anne then reveals that Janelle is her birth mother. Anne begs Janelle not to get in touch with her parents as they would take her away. Bree announces that she wants to meet her real parents and Anne agrees to go home and speak to them. Bree and Janelle go to the house and find it abandoned. Bree calls Anne, who tells her that she and her parents were on their way to the airport. Loris Timmins (Kate Fitzpatrick) joins in the search because she swapped Anne and Bree at birth.

Loris finds Anne and tells her that she swapped the babies because she was angry at Janelle for trying to shut her out of her grandchildren's lives. Loris helps Anne fly down to Melbourne to visit the Timmins family. Soon after, Greg Baxter (Christopher Connelly) turns up determined to take Anne home. Bree and Greg discover that they have a lot in common and Greg admits that he wants to get to know Bree properly. Allan Steiger (Joe Clements) suggests that the Timmins family move closer to the Baxters and Anne joins Janelle, Allan and Bree as they leave town to Cairns in a helicopter.

== Loris Timmins ==
Loris Timmins
- Neighbours character
- Portrayed by: Kate Fitzpatrick
- First appearance: 28 August 2006
- Last appearance: 16 November 2006
- Introduced by: Ric Pellizzeri
In-universe information
- Occupation: Businesswoman
- Husband: Alwin Timmins
- Sons: Kim Timmins
- Grandsons: Dwayne Timmins; Brandon Timmins; Dylan Timmins; Scott Timmins
- Granddaughters: Janae Timmins; Anne Baxter; Bree Timmins
- Other relatives: Kerry Mangel

Loris Timmins, played by Kate Fitzpatrick, made her first on-screen appearance on 28 August 2006. Loris is a wealthy businesswoman and Kim Timmins' mother.

Loris was not happy when Kim (Brett Swain) married Janelle Rebecchi (Nell Feeney). When Janelle gives birth to a sixth child, Loris, who did not want another child to grow up with such a terrible mother, swapped the baby with another. Loris' marriage falls apart and she moves to Erinsborough. She gets in touch with Janae Timmins (Eliza Taylor-Cotter) and gives her money as a gift for her recent marriage. Loris hires Ned Parker (Daniel O'Connor) as her personal trainer and she tells him that she would like a fling with a younger man. She and Ned come to an understanding and Loris offers to invest in Ned's business. Ned takes Toadfish Rebecchi (Ryan Moloney) to dinner with Loris and he recognises her. Loris buys the Timmins' house when it goes up for sale and she goes to see the family. Janelle throws her out and Loris goes to the Scarlet Bar, where she meets Harold Bishop (Ian Smith) and the pair bond. Janelle meets with Loris and Loris admits that Alwyn had left her for another woman. Loris buys 49% of Lassiter's Hotel shares leaving her an equal partner with Paul Robinson (Stefan Dennis).

Loris is shocked to find out that Bree's (Sianoa Smit-McPhee) new friend, Anne (Tessa James), is the girl who she had been swapped with at the hospital. Loris manages to chat to Anne about her family and when Anne's parents take her away, Loris tries to help find her. Janelle let Loris move in with her and she helps with the family dramas. Loris discovers that Scott (Ben Nicholas) has a drink problem and takes him to an AA meeting. She becomes jealous of Ned's relationship with Katya Kinski (Dichen Lachman) and she kisses him in front of Harold. Loris tells him that she has been foolish and she and Harold go on a date. Loris admits that she swapped Bree and Anne, but Harold forgives her. Loris decides to find the Baxters and signs her Lassiter's shares over to Janelle.

== Teresa Cammeniti ==
Teresa Cammeniti
- Neighbours character
- Portrayed by: Hannah Greenwood
- First appearance: 22 September 2006
- Last appearance: 1 November 2006
- Introduced by: Ric Pellizzeri
In-universe information
- Father: Raimondo Cammeniti
- Daughters: Bonnie Cammeniti
- Uncles: Rocco Cammeniti
- Aunts: Lucia Cammeniti; Maria Cammeniti; Angelica Cammeniti; Sofia Cammeniti
- First cousins: Carmella Cammeniti; Rosetta Cammeniti; Rosaria Cammeniti; Sienna Cammeniti
- Other relatives: Chloe Cammeniti

Teresa Cammeniti, played by Hannah Greenwood, made her first on-screen appearance on 22 September 2006. Teresa is Carmella Cammeniti's cousin and she becomes depressed after Carmella sells her baby.

Greenwood received a phone call from her agent who told her about an audition from Neighbours. Greenwood said the audition went "really well". Greenwood described Teresa as a "psycho bitch" and said she received some negative feedback from viewers, but said it was great as the character was not meant to be liked.

Teresa falls pregnant when she is seventeen and she asks Carmella Cammeniti (Natalie Blair) for help. Carmella is desperate for money and when the baby is born, Carmella sells it for $100,000 and splits the money with Teresa. Teresa becomes depressed and cuts herself off from her family. Carmella decided to find Teresa to make amends, but it proves difficult to find her. Teresa eventually turns up at the hospital, after she falls unconscious in the car park. Carmella visits her, but Teresa tells her to steal her baby back. Carmella visits the family and they tell her that the baby had died and that they had written to Teresa. Carmella tells Teresa and she throws Carmella out of her room. Teresa hears about Sky Mangel's (Stephanie McIntosh) difficult pregnancy and asks Carmella for information. When Sky is admitted to the hospital after fainting, she and Teresa end up sharing a room. Teresa tells Sky that she has a husband and child, Bonnie. When she is told that she can leave, Teresa fakes a collapse and is re-admitted. Teresa talks about Sky giving up her baby for adoption and drives Stingray Timmins (Ben Nicholas) away. Teresa tells Sky that she cannot have anymore children and maybe she could adopt Sky's baby. Carmella eventually tells Sky that Teresa was lying to her. Teresa admits that she is lonely and Sky forgives her. Teresa starts talking to Sky's unborn child, when she is asleep.

Sky leaves the hospital to find Stingray and Teresa, who had been admitted to the psychiatric ward, follows her. She finds Sky in the park, where she had gone into labour. Teresa raises the alarm and she accuses Sky of being an unfit mother and risking the health of her baby. Teresa is restrained and taken back to her ward, but she sneaks out and goes to Ramsay Street. She steals Carmella's hospital uniform and when Carmella spots her, Teresa tells her that she is going to see her baby and throws boiling water in Carmella's face. Teresa goes back to the hospital and starts a fire, which causes the hospital wing to be evacuated. Sky gives birth and she is also evacuated outside, when she is taken back to see her baby, the cot is empty. Teresa is found nearby, pushing an empty pram. She is taken into police custody to face charges of arson.

== Guy Sykes ==
Guy Sykes
- Neighbours character
- Portrayed by: Fletcher Humphrys
- Duration: 2006–2007, 2009
- First appearance: 26 October 2006
- Last appearance: 21 April 2009
- Introduced by: Ric Pellizzeri

Guy Sykes, played by Fletcher Humphrys, made his first on-screen appearance on 26 October 2006. Guy is a criminal and Katya Kinski's ex-accomplice. Humphrys returned to the role in 2009.

In 2006, it was announced that former All Saints actor Fletcher Humphreys had joined the cast as a character named Guy. Guy is arrested after holding Katya Kinski (Dichen Lachman), Stephanie Scully (Carla Bonner), Charlie Hoyland (Aaron Aulsebrook-Walker), Toadfish Rebecchi (Ryan Moloney) and Zeke Kinski (Matthew Werkmeister) hostage. In 2009, Guy gets out of prison and comes back to Erinsborough to get the money that Katya stole for him. The Daily Record said that most viewers had thought that Guy's arrest was the end of him and they added, "After all, wouldn't the authorities lock him up and throw away the key? Seemingly not." Guy tells Zeke that he wants the money and Zeke tries to find enough money to pay him off. Toadie also becomes aware that Guy is back and the police become involved. They and Zeke set a trap for Guy, but journalist, Elle Robinson (Pippa Black), attempts to get a story and Guy realises what is going on and leaves. Guy later breaks into Toadie's home to find the money and holds Toadie and Callum Jones (Morgan Baker) hostage. Holy Soap said "Libby and Dan reckon something must be up and call the police, but after a bungled search they leave none-the-wiser. Callum and The Toad have to save themselves."

Katya is shocked when Guy arrives in town with DVD footage of her committing crimes. Guy tells her that he has a kidney problem and needs $10,000 for private medical care. When Katya offers him $200, he blackmails her with the DVD and she agrees to steal one car to get the money for him. Guy continues to blackmail her and she steals another car, she also spots a wanted poster for him and warns him that she will go to the police. Guy does not believe her and then demands another $10,000. Guy tells Katya's boyfriend, Ned Parker (Daniel O'Connor), that he and Katya went to nursing college together and he befriends her sister, Rachel Kinski (Caitlin Stasey). Katya calls Guy and lies that she has the money for him and they need to meet. Katya pulls out a gun, but Guy fights her and Katya is shot. Guy visits her at the hospital and tries to find out where she had hidden money. Guy digs up the allotments, but still does not find the money. Zeke Kinski hears Guy threatening Katya and Guy threatens him, just as Katya wakes up. She shocks Guy in the back with a defibrillator pad and Guy disappears. Guy comes back and holds Katya, Zeke, Toadfish Rebecchi, Stephanie Scully and Charlie Hoyland hostage with a gun. Zeke hits Guy and knocks him to the ground and as everyone leaves, Guy grabs his gun and shoots Toadie in the back. Guy is arrested and imprisoned.

Guy is paroled and he reads a news story about a bag of money found in the community gardens. Guy finds Zeke and demands to know where Katya and the money are. Guy tells Zeke that he has twenty-four hours to come up with the money, he also finds Toadie and his foster son Callum and demands money from them. Zeke arranges to meet Guy with the police waiting to capture Guy. Elle Robinson follows Guy and he sees her and leaves. Guy goes to Toadie's house and holds him and Callum hostage overnight. Toadie tells his housemates, Libby Kennedy (Kym Valentine) and Daniel Fitzgerald (Brett Tucker) not to come back to the house. Dan calls the police and they search the house, but Guy hides. Guy tells Toadie to go to the bank, while he remains behind with Callum. The police return, leaving Guy furious. Callum runs out of the house and Toadie wrestles Guy to the floor. Guy is arrested and returned to jail.

For his portrayal of Guy, Humphrys was nominated for "Best Bad Boy" at the 2009 Inside Soap Awards.

== Kerry Mangel ==
Kerry Mangel
- Neighbours character
- Portrayed by: Claudine Henningsen
- Duration: 2006–2007
- First appearance: 31 October 2006
- Last appearance: 3 August 2007
- Introduced by: Ric Pellizzeri
In-universe information
- Father: Dylan Timmins
- Mother: Sky Mangel
- Stepmother: Lana Crawford
- Brothers: Scotty
- Grandfathers: Eric Jensen; Joe Mangel; Kim Timmins
- Grandmothers: Kerry Bishop; Janelle Timmins
- Uncles: Stingray Timmins
- Aunts: Janae Timmins; Bree Timmins; Anne Baxter
- Other relatives: Harold Bishop; Toadfish Rebecchi; Loris Timmins

Kerry Breanna Mangel, played by Claudine Henningsen, is the daughter of Sky Mangel and Dylan Timmins. She made her first appearance on 31 October 2006.

Claudine Henningsen joined Neighbours when she was seven days old. Her father Warren Henningsen said that the Neighbours team were looking for a baby young enough to play a newborn. He added "Claudine was two weeks premature and she started on the show just seven days after she was born. She is the most convincing actor I have ever seen." In 2007, it was announced that Henningsen and her on-screen mother Stephanie McIntosh were to leave the show. Henningsen's father said the Neighbours team had really looked after his daughter and it was sad to be leaving.

During her pregnancy Sky is admitted to the hospital after collapsing because she was not eating properly. She is also living with the secret that the baby's father may be Dylan's brother, Stingray (Ben Nicholas). Sky's roommate Teresa Cammeniti (Hannah Greenwood) sees her baby as a replacement for the one she lost. Sky goes into premature labour after leaving the hospital to find Dylan and she gives birth to a girl, who she names Kerry after her mother. A fire is started in the hospital and Sky and Kerry are moved from their wing. When Sky goes into her new room, she finds Kerry cot empty. Kerry's baby bracelet is found in Stingray's pocket, after he is discovered passed out in a bush. It is later revealed that Dylan had found Kerry in Stingray's arms and had taken her to a hotel room. Elle Robinson (Pippa Black) found them and took Kerry to Ramsay Street. After a DNA test, it is discovered that Dylan is Kerry's father.

Kerry is diagnosed with leukaemia and Stingray and Dylan are the only bone marrow matches. Dylan is ruled out when tests show that his blood has been contaminated due to exposure to toxic waste. Stingray goes through with the operation and saves Kerry's life. However, he dies a few days later and Dylan leaves to join his father up north. Sky is sent to prison for the murder of Terrence Chesterton (Scott Johnson) and her cellmate Mary Casey (Rowena Wallace) encourages her to apply to have Kerry come and stay with her. During a prison riot, Mary hides Kerry to prevent the other prisoners from getting to her. Sky is later released from prison. Sky thinks Kerry needs her father in her life too and decides to move to Port Douglas, so that she can be closer to Dylan and Boyd.

== Christine Rodd ==
Christine Rodd
- Neighbours character
- Portrayed by: Trudy Hellier
- Duration: 2006–2007
- First appearance: 31 October 2006
- Last appearance: 9 August 2007
- Introduced by: Ric Pellizzeri
In-universe information
- Occupation: Mechanic
- Sisters: Miriam
- Husband: Allan Steiger (divorced)
- Daughters: Pepper Steiger

Christine Rodd, played by Trudy Hellier, made her first on-screen appearance on 31 October 2006. Christine is Pepper Steiger's mother and ex-wife of Allan Steiger.

Following the breakdown of her marriage to Allan Steiger (Joe Clements), Christine realises that she is gay and she struggles to tell her ex-husband or their daughter, Pepper (Nicky Whelan). It becomes even more difficult for her, when her sister takes the news badly. Christine becomes the head mechanic at Carpenter's Mechanics and begins working with Janae Timmins (Eliza Taylor-Cotter), who she does not get on with. Janae and Christine fall out when Janae suggests that they wear pink overalls. Janae leaves for another job, but she is harassed by her new boss and Christine gives her job back. Janae sees Christine kissing her girlfriend, Carol Sinclair (Michelle O'Grady) and Christine tells her that she is worried about how Pepper will react to the news. Janae promises to keep her secret, but Chris realises that she has to tell Pepper.

During a family dinner, Christine is shocked when Allan proposes to her and she admits that Carol is her girlfriend. Pepper reacts badly and accuses her of being a liar. Janae assures Christine that Pepper needs some time and a couple of months later, Pepper turns to her mum for support. Pepper then offers to have Christine and Carol over for dinner. Christine is delighted when Pepper tells her that she is going to marry her boyfriend, Adam Rhodes (Benjamin Hart). Pepper then tells her that she is only getting married, so Adam could get residency. Christine is upset and Pepper agrees not to go ahead with it. Christine and Carol go to dinner with Pepper and Adam and Christine mentions that Adam could get residency if he joined the Australian police force. Adam tells Christine and Carol about the murder of his former police partner, but agrees to look into it.

== Glenn Forrest ==
Glenn Forrest
- Neighbours character
- Portrayed by: Cleopatra Coleman
- Duration: 2006–2007
- First appearance: 14 November 2006
- Last appearance: 30 March 2007
- Introduced by: Ric Pellizzeri

Glenn Forrest, played by Cleopatra Coleman, made her first on-screen appearance on 14 November 2006. Glenn had an affair with the married Boyd Hoyland and forced him to choose between her or his wife.

Coleman enjoyed playing the role of Glenn and said she would like a return to the show. Her most memorable moment was when she filmed the drowning scene as she had to jump in the Yarra River. Glenn was described by TV Week as someone who was going to "cause some serious heartbreak for poor old Janae". They also added that although she is a friend of the "devious" Elle Robinson (Pippa Black), viewers should not expect Glenn to be the same. Coleman said "She's pretty much a nice Tassie girl".

When Boyd Hoyland (Kyal Marsh) returns to Erinsborough after going to look for his father, he tells his wife, Janae (Eliza Taylor-Cotter), that he saved a young woman, Glenn, from drowning in a river and they had a one-night stand. Janae is devastated and she discovers that Glenn is an old friend of Elle Robinson's. Elle tells her that Glenn is coming to stay and Janae begs Elle to ask her not to come. After breaking up with Janae's brother Dylan (Damien Bodie), a vengeful Elle tells Glenn to come to town. Glenn leaves her car at the garage where Janae works. Glenn realises that Janae is Boyd's wife and she assures her that she would not cause trouble. However, when Glenn learns that Boyd still has feelings for her, she pushes him to make a choice between her and Janae before she leaves. Boyd then tells Janae that he might be in love with Glenn. Glenn asks Janae about her car and Janae tells her that it is ready. Janae tells Glenn that she can go now and Glenn tells her to drop the attitude as she loves Boyd and knows Boyd loves her too. Glenn talk to Elle and Elle tells her to give Boyd a lift when they see him walking home. Boyd accepts Glenn's offer and during the journey the brakes stop working and Glenn hits her head and falls unconscious. She is taken to the hospital and Boyd tells her that he wants to be with her.

Everyone believes that Janae is behind the incident with the car, but it is revealed that Lolly Allen (Adelaide Kane), sabotaged the brakes believing the car belonged to her abusive stepmother. Boyd later tells Janae that he and Glenn are together. Glenn believes that she is pregnant and when she goes to the hospital, she meets Janae, who also thinks she is pregnant. Glenn and Janae find out that they are not pregnant and Glenn and Boyd go to Tasmania to meet Glenn's parents. When Glenn see Boyd comforting Janae after her brother dies, she realises that he still loved her and she decides to leave him. Glenn breaks down in tears and tells Janae not to take him back too quickly as he had a lot of growing up to do.

== Others ==
Date(s)	Character	Actor	Circumstances
17 March–26 April	Sasha Hennessey	Eloise Grace	Sasha is a medical student, who makes friends with Boyd Hoyland. Boyd does not realise that Sasha wants to get him away from his girlfriend, Janae Timmins and have him to herself. Boyd splits up with Janae and Sasha kisses him. He then invites Sasha to accompany him to the uni medical ball, but later admits that he still loves Janae.
5 April–1 May	Jean-Pierre Valasco	Steven Cabral	Jean Pierre is an artist and University lecturer. He helps Sky Mangel get home after she comes down with food poisoning. Sky admits that Jean-Pierre gives her the inspiration to draw and he tells her that his real name is John Peter. Jean-Pierre and Sky end up kissing and they later sleep together. Jean-Pierre is devastated to realise that Sky is still dating Dylan Timmins.
9 May	Sean Dempster	Colin MacPherson	Sean meets with Paul Robinson to discuss investing in Lassiter's Hotel and Stephanie Scully's baby utility belt. Sean meets Paul's son Robert and Katya Kinski, who recognises him as one of her old clients. Sean threatens Katya into keeping quiet. Robert, who is infatuated with Katya, murders Sean to prevent him from revealing her secrets, and to frustrate Paul's business plans at the same time.
22 May–12 June	Mikhail Irtenev	Christopher Billy	Mikhail is Mishka Schneiderova's friend from the local Russian club. Mikhail shares Mishka's love of vodka and he buys a bottle of her and Lou Carpenter's home brew. Mishka asks Mikhail to break into her home to prove to Harold Bishop that he needs her and Lou around. Lou catches a burglar and throws him out, but Mikhail turns up a few hours later and apologises for being late.
2 June–4 October	Garrett Burns	Sebastian Gregory	Garrett is a student at Erinsborough High. Rachel Kinski dates Garrett briefly, even though he is older than she is.
16 June–11 July	Justine Spensley	Alexis Porter	Justine attends an Oodles and Noodles gig with her niece. She runs into Stephanie Scully and remembers she fixed her car once. Justine asks Steph to introduce her to Ned Parker and they get on well. Justine forces Karl Kennedy to quit Oodles and Noodles and she replaces him. Carmella Cammeniti learns Justine does not have a niece, and that she paid a little girl to say they were related. Carmella also notices Justine taking most of the money from a gig she and Ned played at. Ned realises Justine has lied to him and he asks her to leave.
26 July	Lilly DeRouge	Klara Lisy	When Cameron Robinson goes to dinner with his parents, Paul and Gail, he spends most of the evening chatting to Lilly. When Paul meets Lilly, he starts flirting with her and tells her that he is the owner of Lassiter's Hotel. Lilly agrees to meet Paul later that night, but when Cameron and Gail turn up, Lilly realises that she had been used by Paul.
14 August – 4 July 2007	John Coward	Jason Cavanagh; Sean Guzzi	John is a lab technician who makes a deal with Paul Robinson to wipe his gambling debts and pay him another $200 if John doctors some test results to make it appear that Paul's daughter Elle has a terminal illness. Months later, Elle asks John to prove that Alan Napier is Oliver Barnes' grandfather and provides John with a strand of hair from Oliver and Alan, respectively and payment to do the tests secretly. The tests positively prove Alan's grandpaternity.
31 August–1 September	Rebecca Naylor	Anya Beyersdorf	Stingray Timmins meets Rebecca at Scarlet Bar and she asks if he can drive her home, as she had had too much to drink. He agrees, but when they are pulled over for a random breath test, Stingray jumps out of the car and runs home. The following day, the police arrive to speak to him, but Rebecca covers and the police want to know if Stingray had seen anyone with her in the bar.
1 September – 26 January 2010	Ray Moller	Steven Stagg	Moller is a local police officer. He investigates Stingray Timmins and Rebecca Naylor for drink driving but comes up short. Moller arrests Max Hoyland for the manslaughter of Cameron Robinson and also investigates the disappearance of newborn Kerry Mangel and works out that Stingray, believing he is Kerry's father may have taken her. He also arrests Charlotte Stone for the murder of Terence Chesterton after she crashes her car when she flees. Moller charges Toadfish Rebecchi with driving under the influence and investigates the disappearance of Mickey Gannon. He is later hospitalized with heart problems and Karl Kennedy recommends Moller be put on Beta Blockers. Moller guards arsonist Jay Duncan after he is hospitalized after being attacked on remand and attends a protest at Erinsborough High. He also arrests Zeke Kinski for breaking into a test facility and promises to be lenient if he names his accomplices, which Zeke refuses to until Zeke's stepmother Susan Kennedy tells Moller Mia Zannis is involved.
16 October – 23 July 2007	Johnny Brown	Philip McInnes; Lawrence Price	Johnny is Graham and Prue Brown's son. He is brother to Frazer, Pauline and Ringo. Johnny is forced into a relationship with Rosetta Cammeniti and they become engaged, but they later break up. Johnny comes to see Rosetta and he spots Frazer and tells the family. When Frazer is paralysed, Johnny believes that it is another of his stunts to get attention. Johnny then attempts to get Ringo to return home. Johnny later attends Frazer and Rosetta's wedding.
19 October	Madison Sullivan	Alicia Banit	Zeke Kinski becomes good at football, which impresses snobby Madison and she asks him out on a date. Madison accuses the Timmins family of being feral and when she goes to kiss Zeke, he gets nervous and she dumps him.
8–12 November 2007	Alan Napier	Barry Friedlander	Alan is Rebecca and Marcus Napier's father. He was an assistant to the Barnes family and the executor of Clifford and Pamela Barnes' affairs. He comes to Ramsay Street to see Will Griggs about taking over his family's business. He later finds Oliver Barnes and tells him about his inheritance. Alan has a heart attack and is taken to the hospital, when he wakes up he tells Oliver that he is his grandfather. Alan later dies after making up with Rebecca.
11–28 November	Rex Colt	David Serafin	Rex owns Black Stallion Motors. He asks Janae Timmins to leave Carpenter's Mechanics to come and work for him because she is attractive. Rex confronts Rosetta Cammeniti about his divorce papers and he calls her names when she tells him they are not ready yet. When Janae catches Rex looking at her, she puts up a sign calling him a sexist pervert. Rex calls her a tease and locks her in his office. He tries to sexually assault her, but Janae hits him. Allan Steiger later threatens Rex and Janae reports him to the Equal Opportunities Commission.
5 December – 9 August 2007	Carol Sinclair	Michelle O'Grady	Carol is a real estate agent and the girlfriend of Christine Rodd. Christine's daughter Pepper invites her mother and Carol to dinner when she discovers their relationship.
11 December – 3 March 2008	Keith Illingworth	Bill Charles	Reverend Keith Illingworth marries Lyn Scully and Paul Robinson, after reassuring Paul that everything will be okay. Months later, Keith officiates at Stephanie Scully and Toadfish Rebecchi's wedding, which is stopped when Toadie realises that Steph does not want to marry him.
