= Katya Kinski =

Fictional character from the Australian soap opera Neighbours

- Neighbours character
- Portrayed by: Dichen Lachman
- Duration: 2005–2007
- First appearance: 12 December 2005
- Last appearance: 7 February 2007
- Introduced by: Ric Pellizzeri
In-universe information
- Other names: Katherine Sangmu
- Occupation: Nurse
- Father: Alex Kinski
- Mother: Francesca Kinski
- Stepmother: Susan Kennedy
- Brothers: Zeke Kinski
- Sisters: Rachel Kinski

Katya Kinski is a fictional character from the Australian soap opera Neighbours, played by Dichen Lachman. She made her first on-screen appearance during the episode broadcast on 12 December 2005. Lachman originally auditioned for the role of Elle Robinson. But producers asked her to play Katya instead. Katya is characterised as a "bitchy nasty person" with a "dark past". She arrives in Erinsborough to visit her terminally-ill father Alex (Andrew Clarke) before his death. She reunites with her younger siblings Rachel (Caitlin Stasey) and Zeke Kinski (Matthew Werkmeister). Katya feuds with Susan Kennedy (Jackie Woodburne) and Karl Kennedy (Alan Fletcher) over custody of her siblings. Lachman believed that her flawed character disliked Susan to justify her own failings as a sister.

Writers paired her with psychopath character Robert Robinson (Adam Hunter). He planned to murder her, stalked her and kidnapped her. Katya develops posttraumatic stress disorder and her neighbour Max Hoyland (Stephen Lovatt) supports her. Katya falls in love with Max but he remains loyal to his wife. Producers introduced Guy Sykes (Fletcher Humphrys) to explore her criminal past. Katya participates in car thefts, is blackmailed and shot by Guy. He then tries to attack her with a defibrillator and later holds her hostage. Other storylines include a romance with Ned Parker (Daniel O'Connor) and being run over. Lachman left Neighbours in 2006 and Katya's last appearance was broadcast on 7 February 2007.

== Casting ==
Lachman originally auditioned for the role of Elle Robinson, but the producers decided to create the role of Katya for her instead.

== Development ==
=== Characterisation ===
"Katya was Rachel and Zeke’s rebellious older sister with a dark and troubled past. She tried to take custody of her siblings, was shot, blackmailed, kidnapped, and jailed during her eventful time on the show. She left Erinsborough (while on a suspended sentence for her zapping someone with a defibrillator) and relocated to Adelaide."

— Michelle Rennex from BuzzFeed on Katya.

Network Ten describe Katya as being "introspective and self-sufficient" after her siblings were born. She had been given a "sheltered life" and became a "naturally curious teenager" wanting to explore the world. They state that Katya was close to her mother and dealt with her death by going off the rail because she felt so much anger and hurt inside. Katya has an extremely dark past and she often shows signs of "self-destructive behaviour". Lachman enjoyed playing the "more fun side" of her character, opposed to the "bitchy nasty person" she was often written as. Lachman said was "fatiguing" but a "good challenge".

=== Reuniting with family ===
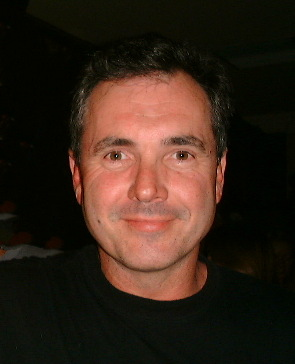
Alan Fletcher plays Katya's colleague and enemy Karl Kennedy.

On her arrival, Katya was described as "feisty" by Jackie Brygel from TV Week and Lachman added Katya is "very complicated and full of contradictions, she may have quite a dark past." Lachman later explained that Katya ran away from home when she was sixteen and that there is a lot of "animosity" between Katya and her father. When her younger siblings, Rachel (Caitlin Stasey) and Zeke (Matthew Werkmeister), ask Katya to return with them to see their dying father, Katya is "too angry to think about trying to mend bridges." However, she later turns up in Ramsay Street and Karl Kennedy (Alan Fletcher) urges her to make up with Alex (Andrew Clarke). Lachman told Jason Herbison from Inside Soap that Katya and Alex "have been estranged for several years" and that she "holds a lot of resentment towards her father" because he kicked her out following her mother's death. Upon seeing Alex again Lachman states that "It's not easy for her to do – it's very painful. Katya is retrained the first time she sees Alex, but eventually her anger spills out, and she has a huge argument with him. Katya says what she's wanted to say for years. She brands Katya's final moments with Alex as a time of "great joy and great pain."

Katya's reunion with her brother and sister is "very emotional". Lachman explained that her character has convinced herself that Zeke and Rachel did not care about her. But their efforts to track her down prove otherwise. Katya and Alex try to solve their differences before he dies. She promises to help take care of her younger siblings and takes that seriously. But Katya's insistence on looking after them causes problems with Alex's widow Susan Kennedy (Jackie Woodburne). Susan had already raised three children of her own but Katya questions her parenting skills. Her friendship with ex-husband Karl becomes an issue for Katya, who they are about to reconcile.

Lachman later told Herbison that Katya feels as though her "territory is being encroached upon". Susan has developed a bond with Rachel and Zeke plus married her father. This makes her resent Susan and her suspicions about Karl only serve to make matters worse. The actress explained that Karl was Alex's doctor and believes he was in love with Susan while treating him. She is also angry with him involving himself with Zeke who had been suffering from traumatic mutism because of Alex's death. Katya's attitude frustrates Susan and she tries to make amends over a meal. Lachman believed that her character "lets her guard down with Susan" and Katya "forgets herself" in the moment. But Susan reveals that Karl informed her about Alex's illness against his wishes and "that progress comes undone". Katya is furious with Karl for breaking his medical oath and threatens to report his behaviour to the medical board. Writers developed the Katya and Susan feud further by introducing a custody battle over Rachel and Zeke. Susan hires lawyer and friend Toadie Rebecchi (Ryan Moloney) to help her win the case. But he is placed in a difficult situation because he has grown close to Katya. A writer from the Sunday Mercury revealed that Toadie "uncovers some dark secrets" about Katya. Rather than report her he deletes the information. Lachman believed that Katya did not really think Karl and Susan did wrong by her father. She explained that her character needed a reason to justify her behaviour. Katya feels guilty for abandoning her family and blaming the Kennedy's "gives her a reason to fight to get them [Rachel and Zeke] back."

=== Relationship with Robert Robinson ===
Producers lined up a romance storyline with Robert Robinson (Adam Hunter). She begins dating him under the impression that he is his twin brother, Cameron Robinson (also played by Hunter). Katya was played as having a fear of intimacy and unsure about him. But following encouragement from Susan she agrees to accompany her new love interest on a picnic. But Robert was plotting to ruin his father Paul Robinson's (Stefan Dennis) life. He worries that his feelings for Katya are distracting him from his original goal. He plans to murder her and takes her to deserted bush land. But when they arrives he changes his mind. Katya slips and fall over the edge of a cliff. He rushes to her aid and saves her. Producers continued to display the character's sinister side when Sean, a "dark figure" from Katya's past arrives. Robert decides to murder Sean to prevent him from upsetting Katya. Katya is asked to do a shift at the same hospital Cameron is lay comatose in. Fearing she will discover the truth, he offers her a lift and crashes the car to prevent her from making her shift.

Katya begins to suspect that Robert is pretending to be Cameron. He takes Paul hostage down a mineshaft and leaves him for dead. Dennis told Inside Soap's Herbison that Katya knows something is not right, "she realises Robert must be up to no good. For Paul's sake, lets hope she can convince others!" Katya exposes Robert's crimes and Paul is rescued. Writers added Katya to the list of characters Robert wants to seek revenge. Lachman explained that the situation is distressing for Katya because Robert is tormenting many of her fellow neighbours. Katya orders a taxi and Robert turns up in a disguise. He takes her hostage and takes her to a secluded location in a motorhome. Lachman told Herbison that had been stalking Katya and is obsessed. She believed Robert loves Katya "in his own mad way". Katya decides to play along with Robert's fantasies about them starting a new life elsewhere. Dichman said her "clever" character tells Robert she wants to spend her life with him. They read an advertisement which publicises Paul's wedding. Katya mentions that it may be the final chance he has to kill his father. She suggests they delay their departure and he visit the ceremony, hoping that it will give her time to escape.

Filming alongside Hunter proved difficult for cast members. He played both characters and Robert spent most of his time impersonating Cameron. Lachman approached the issue by only reading scenes Katya was involved in. She said that had she read the script as normal she would have been too confused. She praised "brilliant" Hunter for his professionalism and performance as two characters.

=== Max Hoyland ===
Following her kidnapping producers created a story in which Katya falls in love with Max Hoyland (Stephen Lovatt). But he is married to Stephanie Scully (Carla Bonner). Their story begins when Katya is involved in an accident. Katya is having an argument with Toadie while Max is on his mobile phone. Katya walks into the path of Max's car and is knocked down. He feels guilty because he knows that the accident would not have occurred if he had been concentrating on his driving. Katya blames herself for the accident and a guilty Max continues to visit her in hospital. Lachman defended her character because it starts innocently and she is not trying to steal Steph's husband. But Katya is a "lonely soul who needs someone to connect with. That's what gets her into trouble." The actress had been playing Katya as having a form of posttraumatic stress disorder. It occurs as a delayed reaction to all of the traumatic situations she had been exposed to with Robert. She added that her "vulnerable" on-screen counterpart needs someone she can trust. Max offers his friendship and she takes it, but her "motives are pure".

Max cannot deal with his guilt and tells Katya the truth. She forgives him and he vows to help her move on. He encourages Katya to explore her Tibetan heritage and learn the language. Max feels obligated to help her and Lachman viewed her character as "so lost now". She felt that writers had set the scene for inevitable trouble between the two. Max agrees to attend a Tibetan language workshop with Katya. But when they arrive it turns out to be a Tibetan meditation retreat. An embarrassed Katya suggests they leave but Max convinces her to stay. They participate in a form of meditation aimed at unveiling hidden desires. Max fantasises about being a football player but Katya's fantasy shocks her. Lachman explained that Katya and Max had grown closer, she is lonely and "come to depend on his advice and friendship." But she noted that it was platonic prior to arriving at the retreat. Katya imagines her and Max kissing, which she thinks is a natural development for them. As her character accepts her feelings for Max, Lachman stated that she honestly believes he feels the same way.

Katya tells Max she loves him but he does not feel the same and rejects her advances. Lachman assessed it had been a terrible time for Katya. She has been "dealing with all the humiliation. It's also caused hearthache for Max's wife, Steph. Katya feels she's messed up everyone's lives." Steph warns Katya to stay away from Max but she ignores her. Robert sends Katya a love letter which makes her scared because he is supposed to be in a secure psychiatric unit. Lachman said Katya fears that her "nightmare" with Robert will repeat itself. So she confides in Max, "the person she craves comfort from". He also ignores his wife's wishes and promises to look after Katya. Production had lined up another dramatic storyline for Katya. It advanced when Katya accepts a lift from Cameron. Max investigates why Robert was able to send Katya a letter. But he is misled that Robert has gone missing in the facility. He telephones Katya to warn her of the potential danger. She presumes that Cameron is actually Robert and escapes from the car. Max witnesses Katya running from Cameron and believing that it is Robert, Max knocks Cameron over and kills him. Lachman warned that serious repercussions would occur following Cameron's death.

=== Relationship with Ned Parker ===
Producers then paired Katya with Ned Parker (Daniel O'Connor) but their relationship is filled with drama and often overshadowed by Ned's feelings for Carmella Cammeniti (Natalie Blair). Prior to the relationship being official Katya has to compete with Carmella to gain Ned's love. A writer from the Daily Record warned that viewers could expect "fur flying" as Katya and Carmella try to "get their claws into poor Ned." Katya fares better than Carmella as she spends time with Ned interviewing tenants interested in moving into his brother's home. Despite choosing to be with Katya and being in a steady relationship for some time, Ned's feelings for Carmella do not disappear. When Carmella is in hospital recovering from facial surgery he becomes concerned and confesses his love.

Writers refused to let the characters achieve lasting happiness together. Additional problems created for them include Katya stealing cars, which Ned becomes embroiled in. He then receives unwanted romantic attention from his client Loris Timmins (Kate Fitzpatrick). She grows increasingly jealous of Katya. Then prison time for Katya results in a temporary break-up. When she is released they resume their relationship but then has to contend with Ned's gambling addiction and theft crimes.

=== Guy Sykes and crime spree ===
Nearing the end of Katya's time in Neighbours, writers revisited the character's past of crime. They introduced Fletcher Humphrys to play Guy Sykes, an old associate of Katya from her criminal past. Guy has obtained DVD footage of Katya committing crimes and blackmails her. She begins to steal cars in order to pay Guy off. But he gets greedy and increases his cash demands. Lachman told Herbison that her character's behaviour "really starts to get out of hand." She steals a luxury car but before she sell it Ned almost exposes her crime. She added that "poor Ned" gets in her way and needing to escape she knocks him unconscious. Katya realises that harming her boyfriend is too much. Lachman found the story difficult to comprehend because she did not believe her character could so easily over power a strongly built character such as Ned. The actress added "she comes to the conclusion that things have gone too far, and realises that she must take drastic action to get Guy off her back once and for all."

Katya decides that she needs to end her involvement with Guy. She lures him to secluded woodland under the pretence she has a cash payment for him. When he arrives, Katya pulls a gun on him and a fight breaks out. In the struggle Katya is shot and Guy flees the scene. When Katya is rushed to hospital she has slipped into a coma. Guy arrives at the hospital acting worried for his victim. Susan agrees to let police search Katya's bedroom but hoping to find her attacker. But they are shocked by their findings and numerous tools which are usually used to steal vehicles are recovered from her property. Given the rise in car theft in Erinsborough, Katya becomes the prime suspect. Woodburne said that her character "goes into complete denial and insists there must be some kind of misunderstanding." But Karl does not share her optimism and is "more realistic" about the situation than Susan. But she continues to defend Katya, Woodburne added that Susan believes she owes Katya "the benefit of the doubt." Fed up with comatose Katya, Guy decides to use a defibrillator to "violently rouse her". But Katya wakes up in time and attacks Guy with the defibrillator. She is then arrested for attempted murder alongside car theft charges. Guy later holds Katya, Steph, Toadie and Zeke hostage. They escape and he is arrested for his crimes.

=== Departure ===
Lachman's departure from Neighbours was announced in late September 2006, and she was due to film her final scenes in the following weeks. Her contract was not renewed by producers. Lachman was grateful for her time on the show, stating: "I was very aware the whole time I was here that, every week I got a script and I was in, it was a blessing. It meant that they fitted me in somehow. I was always aware that it was a temporary thing. It was like a hot day in the middle of winter for me, and I feel so lucky that it lasted as long as it did. So it was sort of expected and sort of unexpected all at once. With this industry, you're just not quite sure." Lachman planned to leave Australia for Los Angeles and London, where she initially planned to go for a holiday, but would not rule out pursuing work there. As a leaving gift the actress was given a signed poster and some of Katya's clothing.

Lachman teased her character's departure, saying "Katya's definitely going out with a bang." An Inside Soap columnist said Katya's departure would be "unmissable" and she would "upset a lot of people before she goes." On-screen Katya decides to leave Erinsborough to take a new job in Adelaide. In her final scenes she tries to convince Ned to leave with her and cure his gambling addiction. But Paul successfully plans to stop him leaving. Katya's final appearance occurred during the episode broadcast on 7 February 2007. Lachman believed it may have been a good idea to kill the character off. But she was content with Katya's exit storyline. She told Will Martin from Last Broadcast that "I think it was good they didn't make a big deal... she did kind of piss everyone off!"

In 2009, Lachman revealed that she would consider a return to Neighbours if she was asked. She said "It's a place that's home to me so I'd definitely consider it if they wanted to. There's always a place in my heart for Neighbours."

== Storylines ==
Rachel and Zeke track down Katya and convince her to return home to make amends with her father. She arrives at Susan's house and takes a dislike to her. She resents Susan for lot letting her share Alex's final moments alone. Following Alex's death Zeke refuses to talk and Susan takes him to see her ex-husband doctor Karl. When Katya learns of their past marriage she believes Susan is still in love with Karl. Katya initiates court proceedings to gain sole custody of Rachel and Zeke. Susan lets Katya take care of them but Katya proves to be a poor guardian. When being strict fails she tries to act more like a friend and lets them stay up late. Susan believes this affected their education. She goes round to their home but Katya is absent and Rachel is having a party. he called round she found that Katya wasn't there and Rachel was having a party and Zeke is drunk and unconscious. The event makes Katya realise her failings and she and her siblings move in with Susan and she bonds with her step-mother.

Katya dates Robert, under the impression that he is his twin brother, Cameron and is heartbroken to learn of his deception. Robert plans to push Katya off a cliff, but she ends up falling off before he can. Robert decides to save her life by pulling her up. She falls in love with him but begins to have doubts when he frames his comatose brother for his crimes. Robert returns to being himself while his innocent brother is jailed. Believing Cameron is innocent she teams up with Izzy Hoyland (Natalie Bassingthwaighte) and Gail Robinson (Fiona Corke) to prove Robert's guilt. She saves Paul when Robert leaves him to die trapped in a mineshaft.

Robert kidnaps Katya in revenge and she tries to convince him that she loves him still. She was found by Toadie and Susan tied up in a camper van. Ned grows close to Carmella and they begin seeing each other. But she thinks they are spending too much time together. A rejected Ned decides to spend time with Katya and they grow close, but Carmella finds out, she and Katya begin to fight over Ned, with Katya making the most effort to secure his attentions. Eventually, Katya won and begins dating Ned.

Guy Sykes (Fletcher Humphrys) arrives in Erinsborough and blackmails Katya for money or he will reveal her secrets. To fund this Katya begins stealing cars. Ned interrupts Katya stealing and she attacks him in order to escape. Katya lures Guy to secluded woodlands under the promise of a blackmail payment. Instead of paying him she pulls a gun on him. Guy fights Katya for the gun she is accidentally shot. Guy leaves her and steals her handbag unaware the money is fake. Katya is rushed to hospital and but had fallen into a coma. Guy befriends the Kinskis and tries to find Katya's money in their home. He begins visiting Katya in the hope she wakes and informs him of the money's location. She spends an additional two weeks in her coma until Guy becomes impatient. He sets up a defibrillator believing that delivering a shock to her may wake her up. Zeke tries to stop Guy, but Katya regains consciousness and attacks Guy with the defibrillator. Katya is given time in prison but released on bail to spend Christmas with her family. Guy shows up with a gun and takes Katya, Zeke, Toadie, Stephanie Scully (Carla Bonner), Charlie Hoyland (Aaron Aulsebrook-Walker) hostage. During an intense struggle between Guy and Toadie, Toadie is shot. Katya decides to leave Ramsay Street after receiving a suspended sentence for her crimes. She accepts the position as a medic to the Adelaide Crows football team and leaves to start over in Adelaide.

== Reception ==
Upon Katya's introduction, a writer for Daily Record said she had a "hard heart". A fellow writer from the publication added that she was Susan's "evil stepdaughter" and "dastardly nurse". When Katya and Toadie shared a kiss, Doug Anderson from The Sydney Morning Herald thought it was "the start of something vile." The Sunday Mercury's Roz Laws thought that Katya was foolish to try and break Guy's hold over her. A writer from Roadshow Entertainment said that Katya Kinski was best Neighbours character name ever, adding "how sexy is that!"

A Daily Record reporter called Katya "disturbed" and quipped "Being bashed by Max's bumper obviously had an odd effect on her, because before long she thinks she's fallen in love with him." Another writer bemoaned the dearth of realism of Katya and Max, comparing it to Bouncer's dream. They added that being run over by him did "odd things" the "sexy nurse's" brain if she loves the "grumpy family man" Max. The writer noted the unusually long list of traumas the character had endured in just one year. Jesting that "Katya must be regretting ever laying eyes on Ramsay Street", they recounted that her father died, fought a custody battle, gained a "mad boyfriend" and contended with Toadie's "obsessive attention". Claire Botwright from All About Soap profiled Katya and branded her "the plucky lass with a shady past". She described Katya as a "crafty" character and assessed that her revenge plans against Guy ultimately "end in disaster".
