= Max Hoyland =

Fictional character

- Neighbours character
- Portrayed by: Stephen Lovatt
- Duration: 2002–2007
- First appearance: 22 August 2002
- Last appearance: 16 February 2007
- Introduced by: Stanley Walsh
In-universe information
- Occupation: Oil rig worker Bar co-owner
- Father: Bobby Hoyland
- Mother: Rosie Hoyland
- Sisters: Izzy Hoyland
- Wife: Claire Hoyland (deceased); Stephanie Scully (2004–2007); Philippa Hoyland
- Sons: Boyd Hoyland; Charlie Hoyland
- Daughters: Summer Hoyland
- Uncles: Colin Barclay
- Nieces: Holly Hoyland

Max Hoyland is a fictional character from the Australian soap opera Neighbours, played by Stephen Lovatt. He made his first appearance on 22 August 2002 and departed on 16 February 2007.

== Casting ==
After his last appearance in 2007, Lovatt said that he did not know if he would be coming back to Neighbours. However, he said that he would "consider any offer from its producers", but thought that characters like Max usually go for good.

== Development ==
Network Ten describe Max stating: "Max always looked out for his little sister and cultivated a stern sense of responsibility." Describing his likeness to his mother Rosie Hoyland (Maggie Millar), they add: "Both headstrong and idealistic, they rub up against tradition and authority the wrong way and frequently find themselves taking opposite stances on big issues." Tom Adair writing for The Age, has described his character as simply "decency personified".

The character's mother, Rosie Hoyland, and children Boyd Hoyland (Kyal Marsh) and Summer Hoyland (Marisa Siketa) were introduced in early 2002. Max's whereabouts were initially unknown, as he left the family following the death of his wife to long QT syndrome. Lovett said that Max "turns up out of the blue – it's a complete surprise to Rosie and the kids". After learning that Summer has the same heart condition as his late wife, Max wants to "take on his fatherly responsibilities again." He appears reluctant to talk about why he abandoned his children, but Lovett thought that viewers would see that his wife's death has had a big impact on him. He knows she was too young to die, so he is worried about Summer having the same condition. Max does not receive a warm welcome from Rosie and Boyd, so Max is determined to reconnect with them and moves into Number 32 Ramsay Street. Lovett added, "Max knows that he's got a lot of making up to do as far as the kids are concerned. But he tends to overcompensate and it all ends up kind of backfiring on him!"

Producers established a romantic relationship with Stephanie Scully (Carla Bonner). The pair were shown getting closer following Max's arrival, but Steph becomes convinced that Max is actually attracted to her workmate Joanne Blair (Nell Feeney), after she sees them talking. She thinks they are planning a date, but Joanne is just asking for Max's advice about the right cricket bat for her son. Steph then decides to go on a date with Joanne's nephew Dennis.

Their relationship later fails after Max runs away to a new family. Bonner said that their marriage was over because "It's been very badly damaged and a part of her feels that her husband doesn't know her at all, and doesn't trust her." Steph is "hurt" and sees "no way back from here".

== Storylines ==
Max follows his children Boyd and Summer Hoyland to Erinsborough, where he reconnects with them and his mother, Rosie Hoyland. He buys into Lou Carpenter's (Tom Oliver) pub, Lou's Place. He later rents Number 32. Max has a relationship with Steph Scully and they eventually marry. When the pub burns down in a fire at the Lassiter's complex, Max goes into partnership with his sister, Izzy Hoyland (Natalie Bassingthwaite) in the newly built Scarlet bar. Their father Bobby Hoyland (Andrew McFarlane) returns to see him and Izzy, and Max initially does not want anything to do with him, but later warms to him. However, Bobby leaves again. Max and Steph plan to adopt a baby girl from Kayla Thomas (Virginia Ryan), a teenager that wants to give up her unborn child, but Kayla eventually decides to raise the baby with her boyfriend and the baby's biological father Anthony Johnson (Adam Hunter). On Max's 40th birthday, he learns that Steph is pregnant with their first child. Steph develops breast cancer and decides to forgo treatment to protect the baby, causing tension between herself and Max. Steph gives birth to their son Charlie Hoyland (Aaron Aulsebrook-Walker).

While rescuing Katya Kinski (Dichen Lachman), Max accidentally kills Cameron Robinson (Hunter), who he believes to be his twin brother Robert Robinson (also Hunter) when he strikes him with his car. Cameron's father Paul Robinson (Stefan Dennis) is inconsolable with grief and prepares to shoot Max, but Lyn Scully (Janet Andrewartha) stops him. Max begins to come to terms with killing Cameron but Paul's daughter Elle Robinson (Pippa Black) cannot stand seeing him getting on with his life, and begins gaslighting him. First Elle steals his football tickets, plays further mind games involving Charlie, and forges his signature, lumbering him with excess alcohol at the bar. Max hires a private investigator and Elle is caught, but the investigator is paid off by her. Max then admits himself to a hospital and begins to lose his grip on reality and sees visions of his family telling him he is insane. Max walks out of hospital and disappears for a while. He leaves a note for the family with Stingray Timmins (Ben Nicholas) who is passed out. Max later contacts the family via the Salvation Army and agrees to move on.

Max returns to stand trial for killing Cameron. Robert is put on the stand to give evidence, but Paul bursts in, screaming at the judge that Robert is unfit to testify. Max's lawyer Toadfish Rebecchi (Ryan Moloney) proves that Robert is aggressive. Max is given an eight-year prison sentence, which is suspended for five. After realising that his marriage to Steph is not going to work out, Max decides to return to the oil rigs at Sale, two hours from Melbourne. When Steph is sent to prison, Max gains full custody of Charlie and they move to Fiji. He later marries Philippa Hoyland (Wendy Bos) off-screen.

== Reception ==
Max became a popular character with some viewers. Robin Oliver writing for The Sydney Morning Herald opined he was compelled to watch Max and Steph's wedding, describing it as 20 minutes of "good fun". Brian Courtis of The Sunday Age and The Sun-Herald also chose their wedding as their "Pick of the day". Fergus Sheil of The Age said chose Max as the standout character from the episode airing on 21 April 2005, however was unimpressed by the lack of scientific knowledge in the episode. He quipped that Max "deserves a Logie" for his "attempts" to awaken a comatose Boyd, by withholding the outcome of a football match.

Michael Idato writing for The Sydney Morning Herald disliked Max and described his appearance stating: "Max who, for the record, looks young enough to be hanging out with the gang rather than claiming fatherhood to at least two of them is dealing with the precociously slappable Summer and the hormonally simmering Boyd." In 2015, a writer for Tvnz.co.nz included Max in their list of the top 30 Neighbours characters. Praising him, they stated "One of the most memorable father figures, Max was headstrong and loyal, an all-round 'good guy' with a desire to protect his loved ones."
