= Rachel Kinski =

Fictional character from the Australian soap opera Neighbours

- Neighbours character
- Portrayed by: Caitlin Stasey
- Duration: 2005–2009
- First appearance: 18 August 2005
- Last appearance: 11 March 2009
- Introduced by: Ric Pellizzeri
In-universe information
- Occupation: Student; Singer
- Father: Alex Kinski
- Mother: Francesca Kinski
- Stepfather: Karl Kennedy
- Stepmother: Susan Kennedy
- Brothers: Zeke Kinski
- Sisters: Katya Kinski; Libby Kennedy (step)

Rachel Kinski is a fictional character from the Australian soap opera Neighbours, played by Caitlin Stasey. She made her first appearance during the episode broadcast on 18 August 2005. She is the middle child of Alex Kinski and sister to Zeke and Katya Kinski. Rachel's storylines ranged from parental bereavement and first love to an inappropriate relationship with an older man. Rachel departed on 11 March 2009, following Stasey's decision to quit the series to focus on her studies.

== Casting ==
Former The Sleepover Club star Caitlin Stasey was offered the part of Rachel Kinski when she was fifteen years old. She said "I was either very lucky or very good, but it's been a fantastic experience for me." Stasey left school after she won the role of Rachel and decided to study using a distance education programme.

== Development ==
=== Characterisation ===
Rachel was introduced along with her brother Zeke (Matthew Werkmeister) and their widower father Alex (Andrew Clarke). Stasey initially described Rachel as "an introverted girl who has had a sheltered life, but she's a really sweet girl."

=== Relationships ===
==== Stingray Timmins ====
In 2006, writers paired Rachel with her older neighbour Stingray Timmins (Ben Nicholas). Stasey thought they were well suited and said they were "sweet together". Stasey explained, "She's mature for her age, and Stingray is immature, so they meet in the middle." She also described their relationship as innocent and added that they were best friends, who happened to have strong feelings for one another.

==== Angus Henderson ====
Rachel falls for her teacher Angus Henderson (Jonathan Wood); they later embark on an affair. Stasey spoke to TV Week and stated: "She's so taken with him. I don't know if she's really in love with him – it's more that she's totally besotted by him. But she hasn't been thinking straight. At the same time, Angus would have known that he shouldn't have got involved with Rachel. He's the adult in the relationship, not Rachel." Their relationship causes controversy among the residents and tests her relationships with family, of this Stasey adds: "It'll turn Rachel's life upside down & it will be something she'll never forget. It will actually destroy the relationship she has with Susan & Karl, as well as many of her friendships. And Rachel's heart will get broken, too."

=== Departure ===
On 19 September 2008, a reporter for the Herald Sun confirmed Stasey had decided to end her contract with the show, so she could return to her school and focus on Year 12. Stasey said while it had been a difficult decision to make, she knew it was right. She explained, "I want to know that when I finish my exams and get my score, it is representative of my abilities. My exams start in November and I want to be able to give them my full concentration." Stasey also admitted that she was looking forward to being "a normal 18-year-old". Producers decided not to kill her character off, allowing for her to return at some point in the future. Stasey filmed her final scenes in October.

== Storylines ==
Rachel is the youngest daughter of Alex Kinski (Andrew Clarke) and Francesca Sangmu and the sister of Zeke (Matthew Werkmeister) and Katya (Dichen Lachman). When she was younger Rachel had an appetite for knowledge and was an excellent student. She and Zeke were both home-schooled by her parents. Following the death of their mother, Alex threw Katya out after she lashed out at Rachel. Alex enrolled Rachel and Zeke at Erinsborough High School to help develop their social skills and have a normal teenage life.

On her first day at school Rachel is picked on for singing in the corridor and not understanding some of the other students, however, she makes friends with Bree Timmins (Sianoa Smit-McPhee). When Alex decides to transfer Rachel and Zeke to another school, Rachel begs him not to and he changes his mind. Alex starts dating Susan Kennedy (Jackie Woodburne) and the family later move in with her. Rachel agrees to go on a date with an older boy, Jake Rinter (Chris Toohey), and she lies to him about her age. During the date, Rachel hears Jake making a prank call to Susan and she confronts him. Alex calls the police and Jake receives a warning, but Rachel decides to see Jake in secret. When he comes on too strong during another date, Rachel dumps him. Rachel competes for Bree's friendship, when Summer Hoyland (Marisa Siketa) returns. Alex tells Rachel and Zeke that he has terminal leukaemia and Rachel runs away. She and Zeke find Katya and beg her to come and say goodbye to Alex, but she refuses. Katya later turns up for Susan and Alex's wedding. That same night, Alex dies.

Rachel becomes friends with Bree's older brother, Stingray (Ben Nicholas), but when she kisses him, Stingray says they cannot be together because of the age gap. Rachel and Zeke go to live with Katya for a while, but they later move back with Susan. Stingray admits that he loves Rachel and they begin a relationship. Rachel is disgusted to find out that Susan was seeing her ex-husband Karl Kennedy (Alan Fletcher). Rachel moves out for a while, but is brought back by Toadfish Rebecchi (Ryan Moloney). Rachel tries to help Stingray with his drink problem and she later discovers that he may have fathered Sky Mangel's (Stephanie McIntosh) child. Rachel ends their relationship. Rachel starts dating Ringo Brown (Sam Clark) after she helps him with his fear of water. When Stingray dies, Rachel tells Ringo that she needs to take a break from their relationship. Rachel grows jealous of the time Ringo is spending with Carmella Cammeniti (Natalie Blair) and when he declares his love for her, Rachel is devastated and eventually their relationship ends.

Rachel meets Angus at the pool and lets him believe she is at university. They are both shocked to realise that he is her new teacher. Angus initially wants nothing to do with her, but they decide to have a secret relationship. When Rachel learns that Jessica Wallace (Heidi Valkenburg) knows about them, Rachel leaves a dance party to see Angus and they spend the night together. Declan Napier (James Sorensen) reveals the relationship and Daniel Fitzgerald (Brett Tucker) tricks Rachel into confessing the truth. Angus is sentenced to six months in jail and he gives Rachel a letter and a ring. Rachel writes to Angus, but he returns the letters. He later asks her to visit him and he tells her that he loves her. When he is released early, Rachel helps him find a home and later moves in with him. Someone throws a brick through the window and it injures Rachel. Angus leaves town briefly, but they reunite. Angus accepts a job in South Australia and Rachel initially agrees to go with him, but she later changes her mind. A few weeks later, Rachel and her friends, Bridget Parker (Eloise Mignon) and Donna Freedman (Margot Robbie), all fear they are pregnant. They take pregnancy tests together, but only Bridget's comes back positive.

Taylah Jordan's (Danielle Horvat) cousin Ty Harper (Dean Geyer) arrives in town and Taylah tries to set Rachel up with him. Rachel writes a song with Ty and they sing it at the school formal. Rachel tells Ty about her feelings for him and they begin dating. When Zeke disappears during a rafting accident, Rachel throws herself into her music career and tries to take her relationship with Ty further. She also blames Libby Kennedy (Kym Valentine) for letting go of Zeke's hand. Zeke is found, but he only recognises Rachel, until she takes him back to the place where he was held. Rachel receives a scholarship to a school in London, but she turns it down to be with Ty. Ty decides to break up with her, so she would go and it works. Ty rushes to the airport and he tells her that he loves her, before she goes. Ty later joins her in London.

== Reception ==
For her portrayal of Rachel, Stasey was nominated for Fave TV Star at the 2007 Nickelodeon Australian Kids' Choice Awards. That same year, she was nominated for Best Young Actor at the Inside Soap Awards. The following year, Stasey was nominated for Best Actress.

A reporter for the Daily Record called Rachel and Zeke "the usually whiter than white Kinski kids". They also thought Rachel's relationship with Angus was "a move sure to end in tears in the not too distant future".

In a 2010 interview, executive producer Susan Bower said the storyline featuring Rachel, Donna and Bridget thinking they were pregnant was one of her favourites from the past twenty-five years.
