= Xander McGuire =

Australian sports journalist

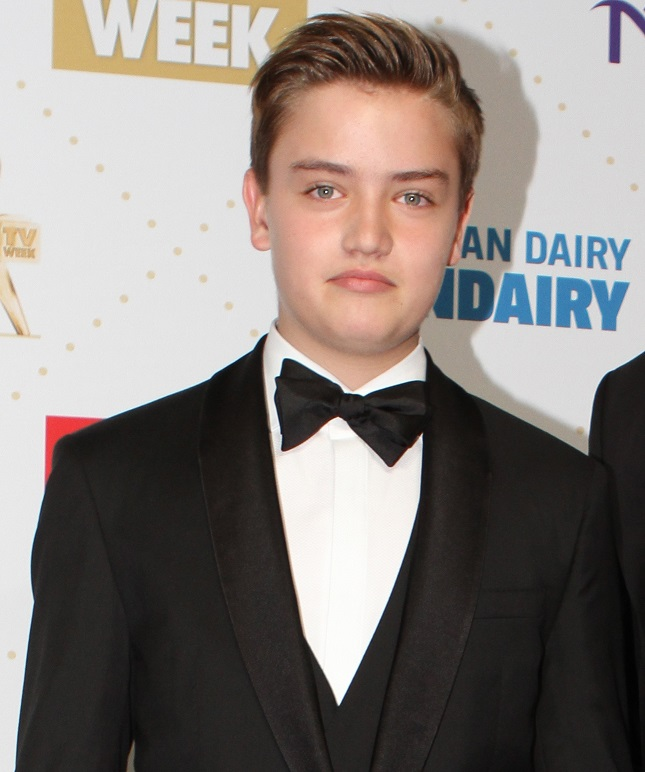
- McGuire in May 2016
- Born: Alexander McGuire; 2002 or 2003
- Education: Melbourne Grammar School, University of St Andrews, University of Melbourne
- Occupations: Sports journalist and broadcaster, former actor on Neighbours
- Family: Eddie McGuire (father)

Alexander McGuire (born 2002 or 2003) is an Australian sports journalist who primarily covers Australian rules football. He is the son of television and radio presenter Eddie McGuire.

== Education ==
McGuire attended school at Melbourne Grammar, serving as school vice-captain in 2020. In 2024, he took a six-month sabbatical from his work with Nine Network to attend the University of St Andrews in Scotland, to tackle the politics part of his Arts Degree that he was studying at the University of Melbourne.

== Career ==
At the age of twelve, McGuire joined Australian soap opera Neighbours, playing the role of Charlie Hoyland.

McGuire got his start with Nine Network, where he worked as a reporter for three years. In 2025, McGuire joined Seven Network for their coverage of the AFL. He also joined AFL Media in 2025. In November 2025, it was announced that McGuire would be hosting the Triple M breakfast show.

Ahead of the 2026 VFL season, McGuire became the number-one ticket holder for the Sandringham Football Club.

McGuire also has appeared on the popular "DDF" (Dan Does Footy) podcast as a frequent co-host/guest.

== Controversies ==
Due to the fame of his father, Eddie McGuire, many have attributed McGuire's career success to nepotism, a claim vehemently denied by Xander's brother Joe.
