= Izzy Hoyland =

Australian soap opera character

- Neighbours character
- Portrayed by: Natalie Bassingthwaighte
- Duration: 2003–2007, 2018, 2022
- First appearance: 1 September 2003
- Last appearance: 28 July 2022
- Introduced by: Ric Pellizzeri (2003); Jason Herbison (2018)
In-universe information
- Other names: Isabelle Hoyland
- Occupation: Co-owner and manager of The Coffee Shop; Co-owner of The Scarlet Bar; Lassiter's Business Affairs manager
- Father: Bobby Hoyland
- Mother: Rosie Hoyland
- Brothers: Max Hoyland
- Husband: Clint (2017)
- Daughters: Holly Hoyland
- Uncles: Colin Barclay
- Nephews: Boyd Hoyland; Charlie Hoyland
- Nieces: Summer Hoyland

Isabelle "Izzy" Hoyland is a fictional character from the Australian soap opera Neighbours, played by Natalie Bassingthwaighte. She made her first appearance during the episode broadcast on 1 September 2003. Izzy was introduced as Max Hoyland's (Stephen Lovatt) younger sister. The character departed in 2006, following Bassingthwaighte's decision to focus on her music career. However, in March 2007, Bassingthwaighte made a brief return to film a few episodes set in London. The character was well received by critics and viewers and Bassingthwaighte earned three Logie Award nominations for her role. In October 2017, Bassingthwaighte reprised the role for a guest appearance and she returned on 12 February 2018 until 20 March 2018. She reprised the role again on 21 July 2022 for the serial's then final episodes.

== Casting ==
Bassingthwaighte joined the cast of Neighbours in 2003, in her first full-time television role. The actress had been working in musical theatre when she received a call saying she had secured an audition for Neighbours. Bassingthwaighte told Melinda Houston of The Age: "I said to my manager, no way. I'd made the decision I'd done my last theatre show for a while, I wanted to concentrate on singing and I wanted to give film a go. We were all a little bit over the soapie star-turned singer. I didn't want to be that." Her manager talked her round and within a week Bassingthwaighte auditioned for the show and won the role of Izzy. She relocated to Melbourne for filming and made her debut on 1 September 2003, which is also her birthday.

== Development ==
=== Characterisation and introduction ===
Before she appeared on-screen, the character was described as a "manipulative schemer, a money-hungry man-eater and home wrecker." Robert Fidgeon of the Herald Sun wrote that Izzy would get "male pulses racing" and called her "a compulsive flirt with a bubbly nature". Of her fictional backstory, Fidgeon wrote that Izzy uses her bubbly personality to hide her abandonment issues caused by her mother leaving in the late 1970s to "find God". Bassingthwaite told him that Izzy was a great character to play, saying she was "outwardly a charmer, inside a schemer, unscrupulous and a home-wrecker. Izzy's life reads like a low-rent Jackie Collins novel." Bassingthwaite later commented that Izzy was "not very trustworthy at all. But people don't necessarily realise this. She's much better with men than women, so they are the ones who fall for her charm." Network Ten branded Izzy as a "bad girl" type character. They also described her as "quick-witted, sexy and naturally flirtatious" and has a "masterful ability to manipulate people". They said she has serious "daddy issues" and likes older men and is not bothered if they are married because she is the first to admit she is "unscrupulous". She is "essentially lazy and will never work for a living if there's an easier way to make a buck" even if that way is "dishonest or immoral". They also referred to her as a "scarlet lady" and "femme fatale". Bassingthwaighte described her as a "great character to play because she's got so many dimensions to her. There's the bitchiness, but also the vulnerability." Bassingthwaighte preferred Izzy while she was being bad, because in her view she was boring when she tried to be nice.

Izzy immediately "causes a stir" upon her entrance to Lou's Place. Stuart Parker (Blair McDonough) and Lou Carpenter (Tom Oliver) both approach her about their various problems, and Izzy tells them what they want to hear, making "an instant impression." When Max Hoyland (Stephen Lovatt) arrives, it emerges that Izzy, or Isabelle, is his younger sister. Bassingthwaite explained that Max did not know she was coming, but he is happy to see her. Izzy loves her brother and they have a lot to catch up on. Izzy is surprised to learn that Max is in a relationship with Stephanie Scully (Carla Bonner). Bassingthwaite said Izzy is initially offended that Max has not mentioned Steph, and then she thinks that it is because there is something wrong with the relationship.

=== Departure ===
In June 2005, it was announced that Bassingthwaighte was considering leaving the soap once her contract expired the following year. Bassingthwaighte said "Am I going to resign? I've had an amazing time and, while it's great to have a regular income and live a normal life, if you stay in one spot too long you get rusty". Bassingthwaighte left Neighbours in 2006 to focus on her music career and she filmed her final scenes on 2 June. Bassingthwaighte said she was "falling apart" whilst doing so. However, in October of that year it was announced that she would be going to London to film a special guest appearance. Neighbours began filming scenes in London from 6 November to air in March 2007.

Bassingthwaighte was invited to return to Neighbours for the show's 30th anniversary celebrations in 2015, but she declined the offer because she felt "the timing wasn't right". However, Bassingthwaighte agreed to take part in the documentary special Neighbours 30th: The Stars Reunite, which aired in Australia and the UK in March 2015.

=== Returns ===
On 28 October 2017, Jonathon Moran of The Daily Telegraph reported that Bassingthwaighte had reprised her role and had returned to filming that same month. The actress admitted that she had been asked several times to come back to the show, but she felt it had not been the right time. Of her return, Bassingthwaighte stated, "They wanted a bit longer and I gave them what I could. In the last few years I feel like I've really fallen in love with acting and playing characters so I'm dipping my toe back in as Izzy because she is a really fun character and very different to the ones I've played in the last couple of years." Teasing Izzy's return storyline, Bassingthwaighte said Izzy would "make an entrance" and added "It is full on and I think if you loved to hate Izzy before, you will love to hate her even more." Izzy returned during an extended episode on 12 February 2018. The character's return appearance concluded on 20 March 2018.

On 7 May 2022, Dan Seddon of Digital Spy announced that Bassingthwaighte was one of 23 former cast members returning for the show's final episodes, following its cancellation earlier that year. Susan (Jackie Woodburne) and Karl's (Alan Fletcher) son, Malcolm (Benjamin McNair), returns to Erinsborough to announce that he and Izzy are dating and have fallen in love. Izzy initially hides out in Malcolm's hotel and later tells Susan and Karl about their relationship before Malcolm gets a chance to. She returned on 21 July 2022.

== Storylines ==
=== 2003–2007 ===
Izzy arrives in Ramsay Street to visit her brother Max Hoyland. She moves in with Karl Kennedy after he breaks up with his wife, Susan. She claims that Karl is the father of her unborn baby, when it is actually Gus Cleary's (Ben Barrack). Izzy has a miscarriage and breaks up with Karl. She then forms a relationship with Paul Robinson (Stefan Dennis). Darcy Tyler (Mark Raffety) discovers that the pregnancy dates do not add up and threatens to tell Karl. Izzy tries to pay him off, but he refuses to take any money. During the confrontation, Darcy falls down a flight of stairs and ends up in a coma. When he wakes up, he begins to play mind games with Izzy. Darcy forces her to give him a favourable testimony at his court hearing. Darcy then reveals the truth to Susan in a letter and she forces Izzy to tell Karl that he was not the baby's father. Karl kicks her out and she disappears, leaving Paul under suspicion for her murder. She is found alive and Paul's name is cleared. Izzy overcomes a drug problem and she and Paul move in together. Paul's daughter Elle (Pippa Black) also moves in and she takes an instant dislike to Izzy. Elle tries lacing her food with drugs to convince Paul that Izzy still has a drug problem.

Izzy has an affair with Ned Parker (Daniel O'Connor), which is initiated in an attempt to get him out of Erinsborough, which both Robert Robinson (Adam Hunter) and Lou Carpenter (Tom Oliver) find out about. Robert later moves in with Izzy and Paul, while pretending to be his identical twin brother Cameron. After she became suspicious of Robert's behaviour, Izzy tries to convince Paul and Elle that he is responsible for the 'accidents' she was said to have caused, such as leaving the gas on while babysitting her nephew Charlie. Everyone believes that she is just being careless and hysterical and Paul eventually throws her out. She gets Paul and the police to believe her after she discovers that Robert had been recording her phone conversations and editing them on his laptop. After Cameron is cleared of all charges, he too moved in with her, Elle and Paul. Paul and Izzy's relationship begins to decline and when Paul is caught cheating on her, she breaks up with him.

Although Izzy claims to have never stopped being in love with Paul, she tries to get back into a relationship with Karl. Karl has no interest in Izzy because of his resentment towards her, and the fact that he is trying to get back together with Susan. Karl accepts a ride home from Izzy and once they get to his apartment, she gives him too much sleeping medication. This causes him to believe that Izzy is Susan and he begs her to stay the night. Susan discovers that Izzy is pregnant and when she asks her who the father of her baby is, Izzy denies it is Karl's.

Izzy moves to London and begins an affair with Pete Gartside (Daniel Schutzmann), a married professional football player. Pete breaks up with Izzy when the tabloid interest in their relationship impacts his career. When sleeping on a public bench, Izzy notices Karl and Susan, who are in London after visiting their son, Malcolm. Izzy later approaches Susan, who agrees to help her reunite with Pete. After Pete agrees to take Izzy back, he realises that Karl is the father of her baby and convinces her to inform him. Izzy turns up at Karl and Susan's wedding and goes into labour. Karl is then forced to deliver her daughter, Holly (Chaya Broadmore). Susan overhears Izzy saying that Karl is Holly's father and she tells him when they arrive home. Karl later tells Susan that Izzy would like her to be Holly's godmother and she agrees.

=== 2018, 2022 ===
Izzy returns to Erinsborough for Toadie's 1990's-themed 21st-birthday party. She is struck by Susan's car and taken to the hospital, where Holly (now Lucinda Armstrong Hall) joins her. Izzy later receives confirmation that she has inherited £41 million. The following day, Izzy and Holly visit Susan and Karl, and Izzy explains that she married an 89-year-old man called Clint, who died shortly after the wedding. She also tells them about the inheritance. After meeting Paul in The Waterhole, Izzy learns that he has naming rights over the new hospital wing, which has upset Karl. She later makes a sizeable donation to the hospital, so that Karl gets the naming rights for the new wing and a position on the committee. Izzy later explains to Karl that her real reason for returning to Erinsborough is to ask him to father another child with her. She also tells him that she will rescind her donation to the hospital if he says no. After thinking it over, Karl turns Izzy's proposal down. Izzy flirts with Mark Brennan (Scott McGregor) and invites him up to her hotel room, where they are interrupted by Holly and Karl. Holly has a go at Izzy, and then tells her that Karl recently underwent a fertility test as part of a research project. Izzy convinces Clive Gibbons (Geoff Paine) to show her the lab where the research projects are being carried out, and she later steals Karl's sperm sample and impregnates herself. Susan invites Izzy to her birthday party at The Waterhole, where Clive reveals that Karl's sperm sample is missing. Izzy admits that she took it and could be pregnant with Karl's child. Clint's daughter, Rita Newland (Lisa Kay) challenges her father's will and has his assets frozen, leaving Izzy without any money. Karl asks Izzy to take a pregnancy test, which is negative. Izzy confesses that she actually wanted Karl back, as she felt happier with him. She then decides to leave Erinsborough without Holly.

Four years later, Izzy comes to Erinsborough with her secret boyfriend, Karl and Susan's son Malcolm. Malcolm tells her in their hotel room that he has not had enough time to tell his parents about their relationship. Harold Bishop (Ian Smith) recognises Izzy's perfume in The Waterhole and they talk to each other about Holly. Izzy walks into Karl and Susan's house as Malcolm is explaining their new relationship, before Malcolm says that he and Izzy are in love. Izzy tries to defend herself when Susan yells at her, so Izzy says that they are in love and cannot hide it anymore. Susan goes to Izzy's hotel room and tells her that she does not want her taking advantage of her son. Izzy brings up the possibility of one day calling Susan "mum" if her and Malcolm's relationship is accepted. Susan and Karl continue to reject their relationship. Izzy meets Shane Ramsay (Peter O'Brien) and flirts with him over his two new fancy cars. She receives a tempt from Shane in her hotel room, but rejects it until they have lunch and kiss. Shane finds out she is dating Malcolm and tries to convince her to leave him, but Izzy says no and walks off. However, she and Shane eventually give into temptation and kiss, and Izzy tells Malcolm out of guilt. She tells Susan and Karl that she returned to Erinsborough to get their acceptance and Susan tells her she never needed it. Izzy goes to Toadie's wedding and parties with Shane at their reception on Ramsay Street. The following year, it is revealed that Holly had returned to Erinsborough on the day of the wedding and witnessed Izzy kissing Shane in his car.

== Reception ==
=== Accolades ===
In 2004, Izzy came joint tenth in a BBC drama poll to find the "Best Villain". In 2006, Bassingthwaighte was nominated for Most Popular Personality and Most Popular Actress at the Logie Awards for her role as Izzy. The following year, she was again nominated for Most Popular Actress. The 2006 Dolly Teen Choice Awards saw Bassingthwaighte win the Best Slashie award. In 2007, Bassingthwaighte received a nomination for Best Bitch at the Inside Soap Awards. At the first Digital Spy Soap Awards, Bassingthwaighte, along with co-stars Woodburne and Fletcher, was nominated in the Storyline of the Year category for the Karl, Susan and Izzy storyline set in London. Izzy stealing Karl's sperm during her 2018 return was nominated for "Most Bizarre Soap Storyline" at the 2018 Digital Spy Reader Awards; it came in seventh place with 7.6% of the total votes.

=== Critical response ===
Of Izzy's introduction, a columnist for Inside Soap quipped, "So you reckon Neighbours could do with a bad girl? Well watch out – one is on the way!" They also stated, "With her wholesome looks, viewers might be mistaken for thinking Izzy has a heart of gold." A critic for The Advertiser noted that Izzy had taken over the "soap bitch" role from Sarah Beaumont, played by Nicola Charles, and they called her a "marriage-wrecking, self-obsessed siren". Bassingthwaighte stated that some viewers had taken her character seriously and she had seen a lot of hate for her online. She also said that some people threw things at their televisions when she appeared and she was booed during an appearance at a backpackers' night.

During a feature on the best and worst soap characters of the decade, Ruth Deller of television website Lowculture placed Izzy at number two on the best characters list. Deller said "The best character in Ramsay Street for ages, if not of all time, Izzy was the best kind of soap bitch (see also Janine Butcher and Clare Devine), one whose motives you could understand, and often sympathise with. Being a member of the largely dreadful Hoyland clan didn't bode well for her, but Izzy soon won a place in everyone's hearts (and several male characters' beds). She was even bezzie mates with Harold, and she bowed out by giving birth on the Thames in the ludicrous Neighbours goes to London episodes". The website later referred to her as a "archetypal soap bitch-with-a-soft-centre".

New Zealand television website Throng said that Izzy had "grown to become a fan favourite" in her time with the show. Izzy has been labelled a "super-bitch" by the Daily Mirror, Metro, entertainment website Digital Spy and Australian LGBT website Samesame. Bree Hoskin writing for LGBT website Gaydar, included Izzy on their list of "Top Ten Soap Bitches". She also said the serial was shaken up with her arrival and branded her "Erinsborough's most memorable bitch and home wrecker". Hoskin noted that Izzy had met her match in Paul, and it subsequently caused "a good vs. evil cul-de-sac showdown the likes of which Ramsay street had never seen before".

The Herald Sun observed Izzy as "backstabbing, blackmailing and breaking more than a few hearts" during her time in the serial. They also said her behaviour "didn't win her any friends in Erinsborough". Izzy was named one of the all-time most popular characters in Neighbours behind Harold, Madge and Susan. Bassingthwaighte revealed that people were shocked to see her friends with Woodburne in real life, because her portrayal of bitchiness was so convincing they assumed they had to be enemies off-screen. Izzy was placed at number twelve on the Huffpost's "35 greatest Neighbours characters of all time" feature. Journalist Adam Beresford accused Neighbours of shying away from featuring "superbitch" characters until "they fully embraced the mayhem" of "blonde troublemaker" Izzy. Beresford described her as "untrustworthy, manipulative and definitely not a girl’s girl, homewrecker Izzy tore through Erinsborough like a massively entertaining tornado." They also thought it was "bizarre" that her only true friend was Harold. Sam Strutt of The Guardian compiled a feature counting down the top ten most memorable moments from Neighbours. He listed Izzy and Karl's affair in sixth place and branded Izzy a "homewrecker". Strutt opined that the numerous stories the affair created was "classic soap fodder". Hiyah Zaidi from NationalWorld opined that Izzy was "the character everyone loved to hate." In 2015, a Herald Sun reporter included Izzy and Karl's first kiss in their "Neighbours' 30 most memorable moments" feature.
