= Stingray Timmins =

- Neighbours character
- Portrayed by: Ben Nicholas
- Duration: 2004–2007
- First appearance: 11 March 2004
- Last appearance: 23 March 2007
- Introduced by: Ric Pellizzeri
- Spin-off appearances: Neighbours vs Zombies (2014); Neighbours vs Time Travel (2017)
In-universe information
- Occupation: Student at Erinsborough High; Courier; University student; Barman
- Father: Kim Timmins
- Mother: Janelle Timmins
- Stepfather: Allan Steiger
- Brothers: Dwayne Timmins; Brandon Timmins; Dylan Timmins
- Sisters: Janae Timmins; Anne Baxter; Bree Timmins; Pepper Steiger (step)
- Grandmothers: Loris Timmins
- Uncles: Kevin Rebecchi
- Nieces: Kerry Mangel
- First cousins: Toadie Rebecchi; Stonefish Rebecchi

Scott "Stingray" Timmins is a fictional character from the Australian soap opera Neighbours, played by Ben Nicholas. He made his first screen appearance during the episode broadcast on 11 March 2004. Stingray was introduced as Toadfish Rebecchi's (Ryan Moloney) cousin. The role earned Nicholas a Logie Award nomination for Best New Talent.

== Casting ==
In the 7–13 February 2004 issue of TV Week, Pete Timbs reported that Ben Nicholas had joined the cast as Scott "Stingray" Timmins, the younger cousin of established character Toadfish Rebecchi (Ryan Moloney). Nicholas was spotted by the show's casting director while he was appearing in a Melbourne stage show and asked to audition for Neighbours. Nicholas began filming his first scenes three days after securing the role. He relocated from Adelaide to Melbourne to be closer to the show's studios. The show marked his first major television appearance. He said joining the cast was "a dream come true". He made his first appearance on 11 March 2004.

In October 2006, it was announced that Nicholas was to leave Neighbours. His decision to quit the show came shortly after his co-star Damien Bodie also decided to leave. Nicholas filmed his final scenes the following month.

== Development ==
Timbs (TV Week) wrote that Stingray has "no respect for authority, his manners are terrible and he is very cheeky." He was also expected to become a love interest for Serena Bishop (Lara Sacher). Nicholas described Stingray as "a bit of a fool like Toadie was – he's full of energy and rubs people up the wrong way, but he has a certain charm about him too." Stingray is first seen streaking across a football field and being apprehended by trainee police officer Stuart Parker (Blair McDonough), who loses his temper when Stingray "gives him lip". Toadie claims responsibility for Stingray and he moves in with Toadie and Stuart until his court appearance. Nicholas explained that Stingray's family are hoping that Toadie will help straighten him out, as he has become "a bit of a handful" for them. Shortly after moving into Ramsay Street, Stingray absconds with some camera equipment and a skateboard. Nicholas said his character has a medical condition, which is part of the reason why he acts the way he does.

== Storylines ==
Toadfish Rebecchi is watching a televised football game when he sees his cousin Scott streaking on the pitch. Scott is arrested and Stuart Parker is called upon to guard him. Toadie invites Scott to come live with him. Scott becomes infatuated with Serena Bishop (Lara Sacher), who tells him that they can only be friends. Karl Kennedy (Alan Fletcher) believes Scott is displaying symptoms of attention deficit hyperactivity disorder and refers him for tests. Karl's wife, Susan (Jackie Woodburne) begins tutoring him. During his court case, it emerges that Scott has been convicted twice before and is on his final chance. Toadie agrees to be his legal guardian.

Scott continues to pursue Serena and she eventually agrees to a date. Scott arranges a picnic in the park, which goes well until Stuart and Jack Scully (Jay Bunyan) interrupt. Serena's sudden change in mood convinces Scott that she is embarrassed to be seen with him. During his first day at school his over-eagerness and clumsiness make it difficult for him to fit in. When Toadie disappears Scott takes it badly, unwilling to believe that his cousin has abandoned him. When Serena tries to stop him from leaving, he hits her while trying to push her away. Without his legal guardian, Scott is taken in by the Kennedys. Scott rekindles his relationship with Serena. Scott is delighted when Stuart and Sindi Watts (Marisa Warrington) find Toadie. Scott tells Toadie that his does not feel like he belongs in his family and Toadie agrees to give him a fish name, which is a Rebecchi family tradition. Scott then becomes known as Stingray. Stingray and Serena break up and he begins to spend more time with Boyd Hoyland (Kyal Marsh).

Stingray's mother, Janelle (Nell Feeney), arrives in Erinsborough and she informs Stingray that his father has run out on the family. Stingray leaves with his mother, but he finds a note from Serena and decides that he wants to go back. Janelle agrees and takes him back. Stingray tries to win back Serena, but he meets Sharon "Shazza" Cox (Emily Wheaton), who seems to be the perfect match for him. They come from the same home town and share similar interests. Shazza later dumps Stingray after announcing that she was using him to make her boyfriend jealous. Stingray then gets back together with Serena. Stingray's older brother, Dylan (Damien Bodie) arrives. Janelle also returns and the family, along with Stingray's sisters Janae (Eliza Taylor-Cotter) and Bree (Sianoa Smit-McPhee), move in with Lyn Scully (Janet Andrewartha). Stingray breaks up with Serena when he finds out she kissed Boyd.

Stingray finds it hard to deal with Serena's death following a plane crash, but he begins to bond with Rachel Kinski (Caitlin Stasey). Rachel kisses him, but Stingray is forced to let her down, pointing out that she is only fourteen. Stingray's confusion over Rachel and a new job at Scarlet Bar, gradually makes him become dependent on alcohol. Sky Mangel (Stephanie McIntosh) breaks up with Dylan and she and Stingray sleep together. Stingray then tells Rachel that he loves her and they begin dating. Sky discovers that she is pregnant and Rachel breaks up with Stingray. He then starts drinking again. Sky realises that Stingray could be the father of her child. Stingray's grandmother, Loris (Kate Fitzpatrick) confronts him about his drinking and she takes him to an Alcoholics Anonymous meeting. However, as soon as she leaves, Stingray walks away from the meeting.

Sky is taken to the hospital and Stingray tries to visit. Sky's roommate, Teresa Cammeniti (Hannah Greenwood) tells him that Sky does not want him to be there. Stingray leaves and starts drinking. He is found by Harold Bishop (Ian Smith) and brought home to Janelle, Janae, Bree and Rachel. He escapes from them and heads to the hospital. Stingray takes Sky's daughter, Kerry. He passes out and is found by Rachel and Bree, but there is no sign of Kerry. A couple of days later, Kerry is left on the doorstep of Number 24, hours after Stingray is released from police custody. Dylan had found Stingray and he took Kerry, but Elle Robinson (Pippa Black) returns the baby to Sky. It is later revealed that Dylan is Kerry's father.

Stingray quits drinking, makes up with his brother and begins dating Sky. Kerry is diagnosed with leukemia and needs a bone marrow transplant. Stingray is a match and becomes the donor. He undergoes surgery and Kerry recovers. The Timmins family celebrate Janelle's birthday with a street party. Stingray sits down after dancing and watches his family and friends. Janae and Bree think that Stingray has fallen asleep, but they fail to wake him and alert the rest of the family. They all realise that Stingray has died. Stingray's heart is donated to Caleb Maloney (Nick Russell). Following the funeral, Stingray's ashes are scattered across his favourite skate park.

== Reception ==
For his portrayal of Stingray, Nicholas received a nomination for the Logie Award for Most Popular New Male Talent in 2005. He also earned a nomination for Best Newcomer at the Inside Soap Awards. In 2008, Nicholas was nominated for Best Exit at the Digital Spy Soap Awards. In 2015, a Herald Sun reporter included Stingray's death in their "Neighbours' 30 most memorable moments" feature.
