= Adz Hunter =

Australian actor (born 1982)

- Born: Adam Hunter; 29 January 1982 (age 44); Brisbane, Queensland, Australia
- Other name: Adam Hunter
- Occupation: Actor
- Years active: 2003–present

Adam "Adz" Hunter (born 29 January 1982) is an Australian actor. He is best known for his work on the long-running Australian soap opera Neighbours, in which he appeared in the dual role of triplet brothers Robert and Cameron Robinson in 2006. He had previously appeared in Neighbours in the guest role of Anthony Johnson in 2005. A split-screen technique was used when Robert and Cameron were required to appear on-screen together, which meant that for these scenes Hunter had to act to empty space. His first stint ended in February 2007, when Robert gave evidence at Max Hoyland's trial. His character then made an appearance in its spinoff Neighbours vs Time Travel in 2017. In 2019, he returned as part of a storyline introducing his character's daughter (Harlow) to the show. In 2010 a campaign for Ford Fiesta took him to five countries across Europe and Africa where he shot scenes on mountain tops, in snow and underwater. Hunter has also guest starred on Yes, Dear.
