= Virginia Ryan =

American actress

Virginia Ryan is an Australian actor who played the recurring character of Kayla Thomas in the Australian soap opera Neighbours. She also played Trish Jenkins in the Australian-New Zealand children's show, Holly's Heroes.

== Filmography (2010) ==
- Holly Héros: Juliette
- Grand-Galop: Véronica *3
- The Worst Witch: Éthel Hallow 3
- Downton Abbey: Julia la Nouvelle Fille De Cusine
