= Marisa Siketa =

Australian actress, disc jockey, animal ambassador, and traffic manager (born 1990)

- Born: Marisa Julia Siketa; 7 November 1990 (age 36); Geelong, Victoria, Australia
- Occupations: Actress, disc jockey, animal ambassador, traffic manager
- Years active: 1998-2014

Marisa Julia Siketa (born 7 November 1990) is an Australian former actress, disc jockey, animal ambassador, and traffic manager. She is best known for her roles as the first actress to play Melanie Atwood on The Saddle Club and as Summer Hoyland on Neighbours.

== Acting career ==
Marisa Siketa was born in Geelong, Victoria, Australia. She joined Screen Actors Australia in 1998 and commenced training in the Geelong studio on weekends. She started off working as an extra on SeaChange and the children's TV series Horace and Tina.

She was cast as Summer Hoyland on Neighbours from 2002 to 2005 before reducing her role to a recurring one to concentrate on her school work and eventually leaving the series in 2007. In October 2009 it was announced the character of Summer Hoyland was being written back into Neighbours in 2010, though the role had been recast for unknown reasons. Siketa left The Saddle Club after Season 1 due to landing her role on Neighbours. Marisa was replaced by Jessica Jacobs.

== Personal life ==
Siketa has retired from acting. Siketa has two older siblings named Clinton and Nicole. She is of Croatian descent and speaks the language fluently. Siketa was formerly a DJ at 95.5 K-ROCK. but left in 2014. Siketa is an animal ambassador for the Geelong Animal Welfare Society.
