= Stephen Lovatt =

New Zealand actor (born 1964)

- Born: 27 May 1964 (age 61); Wellington, New Zealand
- Occupation: Actor
- Years active: 1988–present
- Known for: Neighbours as Max Hoyland

Stephen Lovatt (born 27 May 1964) is a New Zealand actor, best known internationally for his portrayal of character Max Hoyland on the Australian soap Neighbours.

== Career ==
Since training as an actor at Toi Whakaari, the New Zealand Drama School, graduating in 1986, Lovatt has acted on stage, television and feature films. Aside from his award-winning theatre work, his New Zealand roles include 30 episodes of soap Shortland Street, Eve's father in Being Eve, an episode of Mataku and local television success Go Girls. He has also acted in many fantasy shows that were filmed in New Zealand; he co-starred as one of the adventurers in Jules Verne adaptation Mysterious Island, and had guest parts in Legend of the Seeker, the short-lived Cleopatra 2525, Hercules: The Legendary Journeys and spin-off shows Young Hercules, playing the God Morpheus and Xena: Warrior Princess where he played Phalangus and also the God of the Underworld, Hades in the 5th season. Lovatt was most recently seen in the acclaimed New Zealand-set drama series Top Of The Lake, where he had a recurring role as a police officer.

== Australia ==
In the late 1990s Lovatt began making inroads into Australian television. After acting in award-winning small-town tale Something in the Air, he won the part of father and bar-owner Max Hoyland on long-running Australian soap Neighbours. Lovatt acted on the show for five years.

== Feature films ==
Lovatt was award-nominated in New Zealand for his starring role in 2002 feature This is Not a Love Story; he played a soap star who gets caught between two women. His other acting roles include Savage Honeymoon, the car-yard owner in 2008 Anthony McCarten feature Show of Hands, and 2012 conspiracy thriller The Cure.

== Spartacus ==
Lovatt is one of the ensemble cast of New Zealand-shot series Spartacus: Gods of the Arena, a prequel to the 2010 series Spartacus: Blood and Sand. Lovatt plays Tullius, a wealthy member of the Roman elite involved in varied nefarious activities, including slave trading. Lovatt has been quoted as saying he relishes the chance to show a dark side rarely seen in his earlier screen characters. The Spartacus cast includes Lucy Lawless, who Lovatt worked with on Xena: Warrior Princess.

== Filmography ==
=== Television ===
- The Ray Bradbury Theater (1989) .... Xanadu Young Man in "A Miracle of Rare Device" (14 July 1989)
- Typhon's People (1993) .... Denzil/Zeno Secundus
- Shortland Street (1994).... Dr. Ethan Gill(May 1994-July 1994)
- High Tide (1994) .... Simon Shorr in "Sitting Ducks" (11 December 1994)
- Mysterious Island (1995) .... Gideon Spilett
- Xena: Warrior Princess .... Kirilus in "Ties That Bind" (29 April 1996)
- Medivac (1997–1998) .... Dr. Thomas Albert 'Tom' Shawcross
- Duggan (1997) .... Alan Galway in "Death in Paradise" (13 October 1997)
- Highwater (1997)
- Xena: Warrior Princess .... Phlanagus in "A Good Day" (26 October 1998)
- Young Hercules (1998) .... Morpheus in "In Your Dreams" (13 November 1998)
- Duggan (1999) .... Alan Galway in "Going Overboard" (17 August 1999)
- Duggan (1999) .... Alan Galway in "Dog's Breakfast" (7 September 1999)
- Hercules: The Legendary Journeys (1999) .... Galen, the Vampire Hunter in "Darkness Visible" (18 October 1999)
- Xena: Warrior Princess .... Hades in "God Fearing Child" (5 February 2000)
- Xena: Warrior Princess .... Hades in "Looking Death in the Eye" (24 April 2000)
- Cleopatra 2525 (2000) .... Schrager in "Hel and Highwater (Part 1)" (13 May 2000)
- Xena: Warrior Princess .... Hades in "Motherhood" (15 May 2000)
- Cleopatra 2525 (2000) .... Schrager in "Hel and Highwater (Part 2)" (20 May 2000)
- Stingers (2001) .... Liam O'Shea in "Slice" (6 November 2001)
- Something in the Air (2001) .... Foster Sutton
- Being Eve (2001–2002) .... Tim Baxter
- The Strip (2002) .... Detective Shane Robertson
- Revelations (2002) .... George Kent in "False Witness" (20 October 2002)
- Mataku (2002) .... Trevor in "The Sisters" (24 October 2002)
- Neighbours (2002–2007) .... Max Hoyland
- Power Rangers: Jungle Fury (2008) .... Hamhock (voice) in "Bad to the Bone" (2 June 2008)
- Legend of the Seeker .... Declan in "Confession" (31 January 2009)
- Go Girls (2009–2010) .... Larry Smart
- Spartacus: Gods of the Arena (2011) .... Tullius
- Top of the Lake (2013) .... Officer Pete
- The Making of the Mob: Chicago (2016) .... Dean O'Banion
- Ash vs Evil Dead (2016) .... Thomas Emery
- Roman Empire: Master of Rome (2018) ... Pompey
- The Brokenwood Mysteries (TV series) (2018) .... Alex Fuller in "Bride Not to Be"
- Shortland Street (2023 - Present).... Dr. Emmett Whitman (23 January 2023 - Present)

=== Film ===
- Send a Gorilla (1988) .... Darryn's Friend
- Savage Honeymoon (2000) .... Phil Webb
- Zenon: The Zequel (2001) .... Wills
- This Is Not a Love Story (2002) ... Tony
- Show of Hands (2008) .... Hatch
- The Cure (2014) .... Ted Garner
- The Kick (2014) ... narrator

== Awards ==
In the 2003 New Zealand Film and TV Awards, Lovatt was nominated for Best Performance in a Digital Feature, for This is Not a Love Story. In 2006 he was awarded the title "Australia's Brainiest Neighbour" on a celebrity edition of the game show Australia's Brainiest.
