= List of Neighbours characters introduced in 2002 =

The following is a list of characters that first appeared in the Australian soap opera Neighbours in 2002, by order of first appearance. They were all introduced by the show's executive producer Stanley Walsh. The 18th season of Neighbours began airing on 21 January 2002. David Karakai began appearing as Marc Lambert from February and his mother Chloe Lambert arrived in April. The first member of the Hoyland family, Rosie, was introduced in March. Irish actor, Patrick Harvey began appearing as Connor O'Neil from April and Andrea McEwan joined the cast as Penny Watts in May. That same month also saw the introductions of Valda Sheergold and Rosie's granddaughter, Summer. Summer's brother, Boyd, arrived in June along with Nina Tucker, played by singer Delta Goodrem. July saw the introductions of Tahnee Coppin, Carmel Tyler and Penny's sister, Sindi. The fourth member of the Hoyland family, Max, made his debut in August. Maureen Edwards began portraying Ruby Dwyer from early November. Daniel Clohesy also began appearing from early November and his domestic abuse storyline formed part of a campaign by the BBC. Lori Lee and Tahnee's brother, Taj Coppin, arrived later that month.

== Marc Lambert ==
Marc Lambert
- Neighbours character
- Portrayed by: David Karakai
- First appearance: 20 February 2002
- Last appearance: 2 September 2002
- Introduced by: Stanley Walsh
In-universe information
- Occupation: Assistant manager of Lassiter's Hotel (2002)
- Father: John Lambert
- Mother: Chloe Lambert
- Brothers: James Lambert
- Sisters: Jacinta Lambert; Jordan Lambert
- First cousins: Tim Collins

Marcus "Marc" Lambert, played by David Karakai, made his first appearance on 20 February 2002. Marc and his wealthy family buy and run Lassiter's Hotel. Marc becomes engaged to Stephanie Scully, but he also falls for her sister, Felicity.

Karakai told the BBC that he thinks his character is suited to both Stephanie (Carla Bonner) and Felicity (Holly Valance) and that Marc wants both of them. However, he picked Felicity as the girl for Marc and said "Probably because he's immature, he just wants a younger girl." Karakai said that he is nothing like his character and that he would never do what Marc did to anybody. He added that he has not had any bad reactions from the public over his storyline. Of the moment when Steph realises that Marc is having an affair with her sister Felicity, The Age said the reveal "was effected by a single look between Marc, at the altar but unable to complete his vows, and Felicity, a bridesmaid. Steph knew the import of that glance in a second and with it, her heart, and viewers' hearts, shattered. It was Steph's wordless realisation, her moment of clarity, that made us weep." In May 2002, Karakai, Valance and Blair McDonough went to Sydney to film a number of scenes. Felicity runs away to the city and Marc and Stuart Parker follow her. Stuart tries to persuade them both to return home. Karakai and Valance filmed scenes together on a water taxi.

Marc was brought up within a wealthy family and he did not have to work hard for the things in his life. When the Lambert's purchase Lassiter's Hotel, Marc takes over the job of assistant manager and he spends his first days scouting the local businesses to see if they can work in a partnership together. Marc meets Stephanie Scully when she parks her motorbike in his space and he meets her again in The Coffee Shop when they both go to get a drink. They bump into each other again and Steph accuses Marc of following her, they get their phones mixed up and are forced to meet up and swap them back. Marc asks Steph to go for a drink, she turns him down, but she later notices him in the pub and goes over to talk to him. They agree to start afresh and they eventually go on a date together. Marc takes her away on a business trip to Hong Kong and they fall in love. Marc suddenly proposes and Steph accepts. Marc introduces her to his parents, John (Barry O'Connor) and Chloe (Stephanie Daniel), and they immediately dislike Steph and vow to stop the engagement. Marc starts getting close to Steph's sister, Felicity (Holly Valance), who works at Lassiter's. Marc knows who Felicity is, but she had not met Steph's new boyfriend. When she finally meets Marc, she is shocked as she had begun to develop feelings for him. Marc and Felicity end up kissing and Felicity tries to avoid Marc, so she does not ruin Steph's happiness.

Marc realises that his feelings for Felicity are stronger than his feelings for Steph. Weeks before the wedding, Felicity tells Marc that she is in love with him. Felicity decides to leave, but her mother, Lyn (Janet Andrewartha) convinces her to stay for the wedding. Steph announces that she is pregnant and Marc decides that he has no choice but to stand by her. He rejects Felicity, but shortly before the ceremony, he and Steph learn that the pregnancy is a false alarm. Marc hesitates during the wedding and when he glances in Felicity's direction, Steph realises that he loves her sister. Marc then tells her that he cannot marry her. Felicity goes to Sydney and Marc and Stuart follow her. Marc finds her and tries to impress her with a holiday and car, but Felicity realises that they are part of the honeymoon and tells Marc to go away. Marc tries to speak to Steph, but she throws her ring at him and tells him that she never wants to see him again. Marc manages to convince Felicity that they can salvages their relationship, but she starts to back away. Marc tries to talk her into staying with him, but she ends things between them. Marc is not happy and he locks her in his car to try and talk her around. He realises that things are truly over and he leaves for London.

The BBC said Marc's most notable moment was "Calling off the wedding when he was supposed to say I do." In 2007, the Herald Sun placed Steph's discovery of Marc and Felicity's affair at number four on their list of Neighbours Top Ten moments. They said "Steph and Marc had a quick engagement, but in the meantime Marc fell in love with Flick. Flick tried but couldn't hide the fact that she also loved her sister's betrothed. Steph and Marc made it all the way to the altar, but after she said "I do", he replied: "I can't, I'm in love with your sister." Priceless".

== Rosie Hoyland ==
Rosie Hoyland
- Neighbours character
- Portrayed by: Maggie Millar
- Duration: 2002–2003
- First appearance: 13 March 2002
- Last appearance: 9 April 2003
- Introduced by: Stanley Walsh
In-universe information
- Occupation: Anglican Minister
- Brothers: Colin Barclay
- Husband: Bobby Hoyland (divorced)
- Sons: Max Hoyland
- Daughters: Izzy Hoyland
- Grandsons: Boyd Hoyland; Charlie Hoyland
- Granddaughters: Summer Hoyland; Holly Hoyland

Reverend Rosie Hoyland (also Barclay), played by Maggie Millar, made her first on-screen appearance on 13 March 2002. Rosie an Anglican Minister and the mother of Max and Izzy Hoyland. During an interview with George Negus, Millar revealed that she got the role of Rosie, "quite by accident" and that it regenerated her love of acting. Millar had called the show's casting director Jan Russ to see if a friend of hers could visit the set, and Russ revealed that there was a role coming up. Millar came out of retirement to play Rosie. In October 2002, it was announced that Millar's contract would not be renewed when it ran out in November of that year. Millar was upset by the news and fans began a campaign to keep her and Rosie in the show. More than 700 people wrote to Millar's website, backing the campaign. A BBC reporter said that fans wanted to keep the mix of young and old characters and that Rosie had been a popular character since she joined Neighbours.

Rosie arrives in Erinsborough as the new reverend of St. Stephens Church. She immediately catches the eye of Lou Carpenter (Tom Oliver) and Harold Bishop (Ian Smith). It is revealed that Rosie sent her son, Max (Stephen Lovatt), to boarding school, while she went to find herself and become a minister. Max resented Rosie for leaving him, but forgave her when she supported him after his wife died. Rosie then became a mother figure to her grandchildren, Boyd (Kyal Marsh) and Summer (Marisa Siketa), and took them in when Max starts working on oilrigs. Rosie soon becomes involved in committees and community events. She also becomes a regular visitor to the Coffee Shop and the pub, which are owned by Harold and Lou. Rosie conducts the christening of Ben Kirk (Noah Sutherland). Lou sets about trying to win Rosie over and offers to help with the church fundraisers. Rosie is initially oblivious to Lou's interest in her and she builds up a strong friendship with Harold. Rosie eventually realises that both Lou and Harold like and she is put in an awkward position, when both men ask her out one evening. Rosie arranges to meet them both at the hospital and she suggests they help her out with her work, knowing they would agree. She later winds them up by having dinner with her brother, Colin (Paul Glen), without telling them who he is.

Rosie supports Harold when he temporarily loses his sigh and keeps him company in the hospital. Rosie and Lou walk in on Harold confessing that he likes Rosie, and Rosie is put in an uncomfortable position. Rosie encourages Lou to move in with Harold, when he is discharged from the hospital. As a thank you to Rosie, Harold invites her for dinner. Rosie does not feel right about excluding Lou and invites him to join them for dessert. Rosie became more attracted to Lou and she tells him that she only sees Harold as a good friend. Harold is devastated when Rosie tells him the truth. Rosie and Lou are accidentally locked in the vestibule at the church one night and a fire breaks out. Felicity Scully (Holly Valance) sees the fire and saves them. Rosie immediately starts planning fundraisers to rebuild the church. Harold discovers that Rosie and Lou are in a relationship, and he is hurt that they did not tell him. Max returns from the oilrigs and decides to settle in Erinsborough, so he could raise his children. Rosie is sad that Boyd and Summer have to move out of her home, but Max tells her that she can visit them anytime she wants. Lou and Rosie's relationship becomes strained. Lou writes a letter to Rosie, but Harold accidentally drops it into some water. Rosie is confused when Lou gives her the cold shoulder. Harold eventually explains what had happened and Rosie and Lou agrees to give their relationship another go.

Rosie's conventional approach to community and church-related matters makes the Bishop uncomfortable and he eventually has Rosie transferred out of Erinsborough. Rosie is shocked when she is told that she will be moving to Byron Bay. Lou and Harold then fight for Rosie to stay. The Archbishop tells Rosie that he will look into the matter. Lou and Harold's friendship begins to suffer and Rosie puts her relationship with Lou on hold. Harold joins a dating agency and Rosie confesses to Lyn Scully (Janet Andrewartha) that she has started to develop strong feelings for him. Harold meets Ruby Dwyer (Maureen Edwards) and Rosie becomes suspicious of her, but refuses to admit that she is jealous. She later breaks up with Lou. Money starts to go missing whenever Ruby is around and Rosie tries to tell Harold that she suspects Ruby is taking it. Ruby confesses to Rosie that she has a gambling addiction and she arranged to have Harold's house burgled. Rosie eventually tells Harold what Ruby had told her and Harold is furious that Rosie broke her vows to the church. Ruby reports her to the Bishop and some people stop coming to Rosie's services. Rosie announces that she is going to work in Papua New Guinea and she later settles in Fiji.

A BBC writer stated that Rosie's most notable moment was "Escaping from the burning church in episode 4000."

== Chloe Lambert ==
Chloe Lambert
- Neighbours character
- Portrayed by: Stephanie Daniel
- First appearance: 5 April 2002
- Last appearance: 12 December 2002
- Introduced by: Stanley Walsh
In-universe information
- Occupation: Owner and manager of Lassiter's Hotel (2002)
- Husband: John Lambert
- Sons: James Lambert; Marc Lambert
- Daughters: Jacinta Lambert; Jordan Lambert

Chloe Lambert, played by Stephanie Daniel, is the mother of Marc and Jordan Lambert. She made her first on-screen appearance on 5 April 2002. Daniel had previously appeared in Neighbours as Ruth Wilson in 1986. She was called in to audition for the role of Chloe and was successful. Daniel described Chloe as being strong, intelligent and someone who "knows her own mind." She also said that she loved Chloe's wardrobe. Daniel explained that the writers came up with the idea to pair Chloe with the younger, Darcy Tyler (Mark Raffety). She said that it was a "nice surprise" and thought that the storyline was "great" and "a groundbreaker."

Chloe and her husband, John Lambert (Barry O'Connor), take over Lassiter's and Chloe takes control of the day-to-day running of the hotel. Their son, Marc (David Karakai), begins a relationship with Stephanie Scully (Carla Bonner) and Chloe and John are invited to meet her parents, Joe (Shane Connor) and Lyn (Janet Andrewartha). Things go downhill when Chloe and John discover that Marc and Steph are engaged. Chloe tells John that Marc will not be marrying a Scully. Steph tries to make an effort with Chloe, but it is a battle to win her over. Steph eventually tells Chloe that she feels that Chloe does not think she is good enough for Marc and her family. Chloe is impressed with her bravery. Steph's sister, Felicity (Holly Valance), begins working at the hotel and Chloe realises that she is not going to see the back of the Scully family any time soon. Shortly before the wedding, Chloe explains to Steph that she feels that Marc is not mature enough for a marriage and that he is only going through with it to spite her and John. Chloe is almost right, as the wedding is stopped when Marc reveals that he loves Felicity. This causes Chloe to pass out. After Marc attempts to form a relationship with Felicity, Chloe sends him to London.

Chloe keeps a low profile around the town and the locals. When Felicity returns from America, Chloe rehires her to work on reception at Lassiter's. Chloe explains that she admires Felicity for returning. Chloe and John's marriage gets into trouble and she finds comfort in Darcy Tyler's company. When Chloe has an asthma attack, Darcy helps her and she asks him out to say thank you. They go to a showing of The Graduate and Chloe later gives Darcy an expensive watch. When she tells him that John has asked her for a divorce, Darcy wonders about her offer of friendship. After a break-in at her home, Chloe asks Darcy to stay the night, but in separate rooms. In the morning, Chloe's daughter, Jordan (Hannah Jankiewicz), comes home from boarding school and is shocked to see Darcy. The burglars return and Darcy and Chloe are tied up together and they reflect on their feelings. The maid finds them the next day and Chloe and Darcy later sleep together. Jordan vows to get rid of Darcy and she manages to get him alone. She then runs home crying to Chloe and claims that Darcy had made a move on her. Chloe is not sure whom to believe, but when Darcy is attacked in the Lassiter's car park, Jordan reveals that she made the story up and arranged for Darcy to be beaten up. When Chloe sees Darcy with baby Ben Kirk (Noah Sutherland), she realises that he would make a good father. She knows that she would not be able to provide him with a child and Chloe ends the relationship.

The BBC said Chloe's most notable moment was "Being tied up with Darcy for the night while her house was being robbed."

== Connor O'Neill ==
Connor O'Neill, played by Patrick Harvey, made his first on-screen appearance on 19 April 2002. Harvey auditioned for casting director Jan Russ and he read the part in an Australian accent, which Russ said was the "best" she had ever heard. However, they decided to go with Harvey's natural Irish accent for the character. Connor is described as being an "Irish funny-man."

== Penny Watts ==
Penny Watts
- Neighbours character
- Portrayed by: Andrea McEwan
- First appearance: 16 May 2002
- Last appearance: 8 August 2002
- Introduced by: Stanley Walsh
In-universe information
- Occupation: Waitress
- Sisters: Sindi Watts
- Aunts: Joan Crawford
- First cousins: Lana Crawford

Penny Watts, played by Andrea McEwan, made her first on-screen appearance on 16 May 2002. Penny is the sister of Sindi Watts (Marisa Warrington) and cousin of Lana Crawford (Bridget Neval). Penny found employment at the Coffee Shop and dated Darcy Tyler (Mark Raffety). A writer for Digital Spy described Penny as being "clumsy." Of appearing in Neighbours, McEwan told Ed Power of the Irish Independent, "It's a rite of passage. I started off as an actress – and if you act in Australia then you will end up being on Neighbours. It's a small industry and there are relatively few programmes."

Penny comes to the surgery to see Karl Kennedy (Alan Fletcher) about her tennis elbow, but he is not there and she sees Darcy Tyler instead. Penny and Darcy are attracted to each other and when Penny later twists her ankle, Darcy comes to her rescue. However, Darcy knows that it is unethical to get involved with a patient and tries to avoid her clutches. Darcy discovers that Penny is an old friend of Tess Bell (Krista Vendy) and he becomes suspicious that he is being set up. Penny does not give up easily and she gets a job at the Coffee Shop, so she can be close to Darcy. Penny is a natural with the customers, but her clumsiness forces Harold Bishop (Ian Smith) to make the decision to let her go. However, when the locals protest, he changes his mind. Penny finds out that Darcy is teaching a first aid course and she goes along. They almost kiss, but they are interrupted by Dee Bliss (Madeleine West). Dee warns Darcy not to get involved with Penny, but Darcy and Penny begin seeing each other in secret. Karl recommends Darcy for a job at the hospital, but Penny turns up during the interview. Darcy takes her for a chat, but they end up kissing and Karl sees them. He threatens to report Darcy to the medical board and Darcy ends things between him and Penny.

Penny becomes friends with Stephanie Scully (Carla Bonner), who had also split up from her boyfriend. Darcy realises that Penny means something to him and he tries to get her back by arranging for someone to serenade her. They get back together and Penny meets Darcy's mother, Carmel (Kirsty Child). Darcy meets Penny's sister, Sindi, and there is a spark between them. Penny is suspicious when she notices Darcy and Sindi's behaviour around each other. Darcy arranges for Penny to ride in a horse-drawn carriage, but she is disappointed when he does not propose. Penny sees Darcy giving some money to Sindi and is convinced that there is something going on between them. She then reports him to the medical board for taking advantage of her when she was his patient and disappears from Darcy's life.

== Summer Hoyland ==
Summer Hoyland, played by Marisa Siketa, made her first on-screen appearance on 20 May 2002. Summer is the youngest child of Claire and Max Hoyland (Stephen Lovatt) and sister to Boyd (Kyal Marsh). Upon her arrival, Summer becomes the "resident trouble-maker." She develops close relationships with older women because of her mother's death.

== Valda Sheergold ==
Valda Sheergold
- Neighbours character
- Portrayed by: Joan Sydney; Lauren Anderson (Young Valda)
- Duration: 2002–2005, 2007–2008
- First appearance: 22 May 2002
- Last appearance: 28 March 2008
- Introduced by: Stanley Walsh
In-universe information
- Occupation: Retired postmistress Chef; Online entrepreneur
- Sisters: Connie O'Rourke; Beverly Sheergold
- Husband: Charlie Cassidy (2004)
- Daughters: Lyn Scully
- Grandsons: Jack Scully; Oscar Scully
- Granddaughters: Stephanie Scully; Felicity Scully; Michelle Scully
- Nieces: Marnie O'Rourke
- Other relatives: Charlie Hoyland; Adam Fitzgerald

Valda Lynette Sheergold, played by Joan Sydney, made her first on-screen appearance on 22 May 2002. Valda is Lyn Scully's mother and grandmother to Stephanie, Felicity, Michelle, Jack and Oscar. She tries to form romances with both Harold Bishop and Lou Carpenter, but she marries Charlie Cassidy instead. In 2007, it was announced that Sydney would be reprising her role of Valda as a regular cast member, just as Neighbours began returning to its roots of family-focused drama. In an old home movie, a young Valda was portrayed by Lauren Anderson.

Lyn Scully (Janet Andrewartha) announces that her Aunt Valda cannot make Stephanie (Carla Bonner) and Marc's (David Karakai) wedding, much to the family's relief. However, Valda does turn up on the afternoon of wedding, shortly after it had been called off. The Kennedys offer Valda a room, which she accepts. Karl Kennedy (Alan Fletcher) is not happy when she moves her two poodles, Blanche and Stella, in. Valda develops an interest in Harold Bishop (Ian Smith) and when Karl throws her out, Harold invites her to move in with him. Valda sets up a double date for her and Harold with Rosie Hoyland (Maggie Millar) and Lou Carpenter (Tom Oliver). Harold asks for Rosie's help in putting Valda off of him and she attempts to tell Valda that she is not Harold's type. Valda misunderstands Rosie and believes Lou and Harold are a couple. When Harold realises that Valda thinks he is gay, he tries to tell her the truth and ends up kissing her. Valda is thrilled with this development. When she finds an old stamp, which is worth thousands of dollars, she sets off on a cruise. Valda returns unannounced months later and reveals that she found romance with a man named Andreas. He writes to Valda and tells her that he will visit and bring her poodles. Valda soon admits that she has little of her money left and she gets a job at the pub, cooking meals. Valda manages to convince Lou to keep her on full-time, when her ideas, such as themed meals, see profits go up.

Valda helps Lyn during her pregnancy, but Lyn finds Valda's advice hard to take as she does not have any children of her own. Valda tells Andreas that she is not as rich as he thinks and he dumps her over the phone and sends her poodles back. Valda then falls for Lou. She tells him that she is really Lyn's mother and Lou promises to keep the information to himself. Valda runs away when Joe Scully (Shane Connor) kicks her out of the Scully house. Lou and Steph find her and realise that she is suffering from pneumonia, they rush her to the hospital. While Valda is recovering, Lyn discovers that she is her mother and not Connie O'Rourke (Val Jellay). Valda is unaware of Lyn's discovery and when she goes to see her family, Joe warns Valda her that everyone knows the truth. Lyn refuses to speak Valda and blocks her out of her life. Lyn becomes curious about her real father, Charlie Cassidy (Cliff Ellen), and asks Valda where she can find him. Valda tells her that he used to run a fishing business in Shelly Bay and they go to see Charlie. Valda is sad to learn that Charlie had never loved her, but she makes up with Lyn. She then decides to take a chef's job near Broome, but comes back to see her new grandson's christening and for Christmas.

When she finds out Lou is engaged to Trixie Tucker (Wendy Stapleton), she is devastated. During the wedding, Valda announces the marriage is a sham. Months later, Valda comes back to teach at a catering school and Lou decides to make a go of things with her. They end up living and working together and try to go on a date. Charlie comes to town and he proposes to Valda, she accepts and they marry. Charlie dies shortly after returning from their honeymoon and Valda moves to Shelly Bay. Lyn joins her a few years later. Valda creates her own online company selling lingerie. Valda comes back to Erinsborough and Lou is keen to learn about her new online venture. Valda convinces Carmella Cammeniti (Natalie Blair) to take her fruit and veg business online too. Valda discovers that that man who designed her website is bankrupt and her site just consists of one page with no way to buy things on it. Valda takes money from her bank account to pay back both Lou and Carmella, who had lost their money. Valda sells her car Steph offers to loan her money to pay off her debts. Valda helps out at Charlie's bar. One day she falls asleep in the kitchen and Lou has to save her when the room fills with smoke. Valda asks Harold if he will drop her off in Shelly Bay, as he leaves for his trip around Australia and she departs Erinsborough once again.

Paul Kalina of The Age said Valda is "a Margaret Thatcher-lookalike whose gravity-defying hairdo probably accounts for the hole in the ozone layer." Last Broadcast said Valda was one of seven best-loved characters who have departed and returned to Neighbours, they also called her a "troublemaker." The BBC said Valda's most notable moment was "When she thought that she had turned Harold from gay to straight with her womanly charms." An Inside Soap critic branded Valda one of the "worst dressed characters" in soap. They assessed that Valda was stylised in "loud, oversized printed blouses" that hid her "buxom figure". They described her as looking a "little on the dumpy side" owing to her "tent-like skirts". They concluded that Valda has a "love of bright colours" that suited her personality well, but believed she could achieve a more sophisticated look.

== Boyd Hoyland ==
Boyd Hoyland, played by Kyal Marsh, made his first on-screen appearance on 5 June 2002. Boyd is Claire and Max Hoyland's (Stephen Lovatt) only son and brother to Summer (Marisa Siketa) and Charlie (Jacob Brito). Marsh joined the cast of Neighbours when he was fourteen years old. Boyd is described as Ramsay Street's "blue-eyed hunk" who is a "studious schoolboy."

== Nina Tucker ==
Nina Tucker, played by singer Delta Goodrem, made her first on-screen appearance on 11 June 2002. Goodrem almost turned down the role of Nina as she was not happy with the "bad girl" character written for her. Goodrem had a record deal with Sony Records at the time and felt the part did not suit her music. The Neighbours producers rewrote the role for her. Goodrem's first single "Born To Try" was incorporated into the show and it became the number one single within weeks of it being performed.

== Tahnee Coppin ==
Tahnee Coppin
- Neighbours character
- Portrayed by: Anna Jennings-Edquist
- Duration: 2002–2003
- First appearance: 2 July 2002
- Last appearance: 29 May 2003
- Introduced by: Stanley Walsh
In-universe information
- Occupation: Student; Waitress
- Brothers: Taj Coppin

Tahnee Coppin, played by Anna Jennings-Edquist, is the sister of Taj Coppin. She made her first on-screen appearance on 2 July 2002. The Sunday Times described Tahnee as a "super-bitch schoolgirl."

Tahnee pursues Michelle Scully's (Kate Keltie) boyfriend, Connor O'Neil (Patrick Harvey), despite being warned off. When Tahnee realises that Connor cannot read or write, she begins to blackmail him. Tahnee tells him that he has to kiss her if he does not want his secret revealed to everyone. Michelle, unaware that Tahnee is blackmailing her boyfriend, starts to become friendly with her. When Joe Scully (Shane Connor) sees Tahnee and Connor together, Connor decides to tell Michelle the truth. He explains to Tahnee that the blackmail has to stop, but he cannot go through with telling Michelle and Tahnee cannot go through with it either. Tahnee decides to get some sympathy and she pretends that her mother is in the hospital. Michelle is horrified when Tahnee later admits that she lied and throws her out of her house. Months later, Michelle discovers that Tahnee's grandfather is ill and they start to become friends again. Tahnee tricks Nina Tucker (Delta Goodrem) into admitting that she fancies Connor and Tahnee begins blackmailing her. Tahnee threatens to reveal everything to Michelle and drops hints when they are all in the same room together. Tahnee later dyes Nina's hair green after offering to give her a makeover.

Connor enters Nina's song, "Born To Try", into UniFM's undiscovered talent contest. As Connor had entered it anonymously, Tahnee takes the opportunity to claim that she is the singer. Nina's song wins the contest and Tahnee is just about to claim the prize when Nina stands up for herself and announces she is the real singer. Nina sings the song on stage to prove it and Tahnee reveals to Michelle that Nina is in love with Connor. When Tahnee, Michelle and Nina get through to the final interviews for an exchange programme to New York, Tahnee gets Nina to give up her interview and she gets on the programme and leaves for New York. A few months later, Tahnee returns and she uses her older brother, Taj (Jaime Robbie Reyne), to get a job at Lassiter's Hotel. Tahnee tells everyone that she had been thrown off the exchange programme, but the truth was that Tahnee had not fitted it and did not make any friends. Tahnee finds out about Nina cheating on Taj with Jack Scully (Jay Bunyan) and she decides to get revenge, but when Nina stands up for Tahnee against some bullies, they become friends. Nina is sacked for sending an email to everyone on the hotel computer system, but Tahnee owns up to her part in the joke and she is sacked too. Her parents then decide to send her away to boarding school.

The BBC said Tahnee's most notable moment was "Blackmailing Connor over his illiteracy."

== Carmel Tyler ==
Carmel Tyler
- Neighbours character
- Portrayed by: Kirsty Child
- Duration: 2002, 2012–2013
- First appearance: 10 July 2002
- Last appearance: 23 January 2013
- Introduced by: Stanley Walsh (2002); Richard Jasek (2012)
In-universe information
- Occupation: Drama teacher
- Mother: Grace Smith
- Sisters: Liz Conway; Susan Kennedy
- Husband: Robert Tyler (until 2012)
- Sons: Darcy Tyler
- Nephews: Malcolm Kennedy; Billy Kennedy
- Nieces: Libby Kennedy; Holly Hoyland (step); Elly Conway; Bea Nilsson
- Other relatives: Ben Kirk; Jackson Kennedy; Susannah Kennedy; Aster Conway

Carmel Tyler, played by Kirsty Child, made her first screen appearance on 10 July 2002. Carmel is the older sister of Susan Kennedy (Jackie Woodburne) and she was "instrumental" in helping Karl Kennedy (Alan Fletcher) find her sister, after she went missing while suffering from retrograde amnesia. Carmel departed on 12 July 2002. On 12 September 2012, it was announced that Carmel would be returning to Neighbours. Child was contracted for two months and she began appearing from 9 November. Child commented that returning to the set had been fun. She later revealed that the phone call asking her to return to Neighbours came out of the blue, saying "I was totally taken by surprise. The last time I was on, Susan had amnesia and was missing, so I came to look for her. Jackie, who I'd worked with before in Prisoner, is a gorgeous lady and an absolute delight to work with, so it's been a real pleasure to come back."

A Channel 5 website writer stated that Carmel and Susan's "strong personalities will have them butting heads in no time. The drama escalates when the newly single ladies find themselves vying for the attention of the same man. Who will win?" TV Week's Jackie Bryel revealed that the man Carmel sets her sights on is Susan's ex-husband, Karl. Shortly after her arrival, Carmel reveals that she has separated from her husband, Robert, and is ready to find a new relationship. Child told Brygel "Carmel just breezes in and thinks she'll come and stay with Susan to start a new life in Erinsborough. She gives Susan a little bit of a shock, and not an entirely pleasant one! Carmel is very outgoing, and I don't think she's overly sensitive to the feelings of others. She's also very keen to find a man and wants Susan to join her on a manhunt." Carmel takes Susan along to a speed dating night and they are surprised to find Karl there too. Child explained that Carmel thinks Karl is a very eligible man, while he has no idea that she is interested in him. Carmel departed on 23 January 2013.

Carmel is Susan and Liz's (Christine Keogh) sister and the mother of Darcy Tyler (Mark Raffety). She comes to Erinsborough to visit Darcy and to help Karl Kennedy find Susan, who has run away after being diagnosed with amnesia. Carmel and Karl initially clash and start arguing, but Karl states that Carmel is the only person there that knew Susan in 1972, the year she believes it is. While looking through an old photo album, Carmel spots a boy that Susan had been close to. She struggles to remember his name, but eventually remembers that he is Craig Benson (Tim Hughes). Carmel meets Penny Watts (Andrea McEwan) in the Coffee Shop and Penny tells her that she is nervous about meeting her boyfriend's mother. That same evening, Carmel goes out to dinner with Darcy and introduces Penny as his girlfriend. She and Carmel are embarrassed to admit that they already knew each other. Carmel leaves early because she is worried about Susan. Carmel and Penny team up to play a joke on Darcy, who fears that his mother hates his girlfriend. The two women pretend to argue whenever Darcy is around, but Carmel later admits that she likes Penny and warns her son not to break her heart. Carmel's visit ends when Susan is found and she is told that there is not much else she can do.

Ten years later, Carmel comes to visit Susan in Erinsborough. She reveals that she and Robert are getting divorced. Carmel takes Susan speed dating and they run into Karl. During their turn, Carmel and Karl get on well and reminisce about the past. Carmel starts flirting with Karl, though he is initially unaware of her intentions. When Carmel states that she wants to have fun on her last day, Susan takes her to pole dancing classes and Carmel injures her knee. Susan later asks Carmel to stay a bit longer. When Susan takes Priya Kapoor (Menik Gooneratne) in, Karl invites Carmel to stay with him and she accepts his offer. Carmel later goes to Karl's room with a bottle of wine and Summer sees them leave together. Carmel states that she is going to go back home and when Susan asks why, she explains that Karl made a move on her. However, Susan learns from Karl that Carmel is lying. She confronts her sister and tells her to leave. Carmel later apologises to Karl and Susan. The day before she leaves, Carmel helps Karl and Susan come up with some ideas for a fundraising night. When Susan tells her about almost kissing Karl, Carmel tells her sister that she and Karl deserve to be happy.

== Sindi Watts ==
Sindi Watts, played by Marisa Warrington, made her first on-screen appearance on 19 July 2002. Warrington joined the cast in early 2002 and she described the character of Sindi as "one-part stalker, one-part lunatic."

== Max Hoyland ==
Max Hoyland, played by Stephen Lovatt, made his first on-screen appearance on 22 August 2002. Max is the only son of Bobby (Andrew McFarlane) and Rosie Hoyland (Maggie Millar) and brother to Izzy (Natalie Bassingthwaighte). Max is described as having a "cultivated a stern sense of responsibility." He took up work on the oil rigs after his wife died as they allowed him to deal with his grief in private.

== Ruby Dwyer ==
Ruby Dwyer
- Neighbours character
- Portrayed by: Maureen Edwards
- Duration: 2002–2003
- First appearance: 8 November 2002
- Last appearance: 25 June 2003
- Introduced by: Stanley Walsh
In-universe information
- Occupation: Waitress
- Sons: Derek

Ruby Dwyer, played by Maureen Edwards, made her first appearance on 8 November 2002. Ruby was a love interest for Harold Bishop (Ian Smith). She has a gambling addiction and steals from him to fund it. Following a number of robberies in the area, including at the pub and the Kennedy's home, Ruby becomes the prime suspect because of her history and she is arrested, leaving her "distraught". Edwards explained: "It's devastating for her, as she's been trying so hard to turn her life around. To get caught up in this set of circumstances is pretty wearing." Harold "is also beside himself", as he has come to care for Ruby. Edwards described Harold as her character's "rock" and thought Ruby was falling in love with him, but also noted that their relationship has had "tough times." Lyn Scully (Janet Andrewartha) doubts Ruby's guilt and believes someone else carried out the robberies.

Cameron Adams of the Herald Sun was not a fan of the character, saying she "may well be the nastiest piece of work to hit Ramsay St since Nicola Charles." Adams later called Ruby "evil" for robbing Harold while he donated a kidney, adding "And she stands there with him in his hour of need, even helping him talk to the police. She's the devil! In downtown Ramsay Street!" When Ruby is finally caught out, Adams picked out her confession as a highlight of the episode, quipping "Too little, too late, lady." The character's profile on the BBC's Neighbours site stated Ruby's most notable moment was "organising to have Harold's house robbed to fund her gambling habit."

Harold Bishop meets Ruby through a dating agency. Harold is happy as Ruby is kind, gentle and enjoys doing charity work. Rosie Hoyland (Maggie Millar) becomes suspicious of Harold's perfect woman. Ruby and Harold go away together and return with their relationship on firmer ground. Rosie's bad feeling about Ruby grows, but refuses to admit that she is jealous. Ruby begins to speak about her son, Derek, who is about to lose his farm because of his debts. Harold offers to loan Ruby some money. Rosie decides to look into Derek's situation and discovers that Derek does not live in the place Ruby mentioned. Ruby explains that she got the place wrong as she is growing forgetful. Money goes missing from the Coffee Shop during Ruby's shift and from Rosie's handbag during a play rehearsal.

Ruby offers to mind Harold's home, while he stays in hospital. However, she has an ulterior motive as she is desperate to pay off her debts. She arranges for two men to break into Harold's house and sell off his belongings. Rosie is convinced that the burglary was not a coincidence and she sees Ruby coming out of a casino. Ruby confesses to the burglary and reveals that she has a gambling addiction. Rosie, who is a minister, is not allowed to tell Harold the truth. However, she deems the information too severe to keep to herself and tells Harold. He is horrified that Ruby betrayed him and that Rosie betrayed her role as a minister. Ruby reports Rosie to the Bishop and tries to repair her relationship with Harold. She tells him that his friendship means a lot to her and announces that she is going away to get help for her problem.

Ruby returns to town not long after and Harold is happy to see her. He offers her a room, but she prefers to stay in a hostel. Lou Carpenter (Tom Oliver) does not trust Ruby as he believes she ruined Harold's life and caused Rosie to leave town. The takings from Lou's pub are stolen and Lou immediately believes Ruby did it. He asks her if he can check her handbag. A few days later, a parcel arrives for Karl Kennedy (Alan Fletcher) at Number 24 and Ruby goes to return it. She leaves it on the doorstep after getting no reply from the Kennedy house. Her movements are watched by Connor O'Neill (Patrick Harvey). The Kennedy home is burgled that afternoon and Ruby becomes a suspect. The evidence is against her as she offered to help Karl get some jewellery valued days before and Connor comes forward with what he saw. Ruby is arrested, but it emerges that Darcy Tyler (Mark Raffety) was the culprit and everyone apologises to Ruby. When Ruby shows Harold a statue in the window of a shop that she had put by and was gradually buying back, Harold buys it for her. Ruby is moved by the gesture, but she realises that she will not be able to stand on her own two feet with Harold there and she decides to go and stay with Derek. She says a tearful goodbye to Harold.

== Daniel Clohesy ==
Daniel Clohesy
- Neighbours character
- Portrayed by: Thomas Blackburne
- Duration: 2002–2004
- First appearance: 11 November 2002
- Last appearance: 24 February 2004
- Introduced by: Stanley Walsh
In-universe information
- Occupation: Student
- Father: Edward Clohesy

Daniel Clohesy, played by Thomas Blackburne, is a friend of Boyd Hoyland. He made his first on-screen appearance on 11 November 2002. Daniel's domestic abuse storyline formed part of a campaign by the BBC called "Hitting Home", which aimed to "break the taboos and myths surrounding domestic violence."

In February 2003, the BBC began a season of programmes on television, radio and online about the subject of domestic violence. The BBC Press Office explained "Hitting Home features in primetime and daytime BBC ONE programming, storylines in Casualty and Neighbours, a powerful intimate documentary, Dangerous Love: Tales of Domestic Violence, an Eastenders special and a Panorama report." Neighbours used the character of Daniel to form a storyline about violence within the family. Boyd Hoyland (Kyal Marsh) discovers that Daniel is being beaten by his father when he notices a bruise on his face. Daniel later leaves his home and comes to Boyd asking for help. The head of BBC Lifeskills, Seetha Kumar, said "The storyline in Neighbours is more about the support friends can provide."

Daniel is a friend of Boyd Hoyland from Erinsborough High. They were almost enemies when Daniel started winding Boyd up about his new girlfriend, Heather Green (Megan Harrington). However, Daniel is just jealous of Boyd's luck with the girls and when he asks Boyd for advice, they become friends. Heather dumps Boyd when she hears that he has been called the school stud, but Daniel decides to help Boyd win her back. They attempt to steal a sign from Heather Street in a bid to impress her. Boyd notices a bruise on Daniel's face and he claims that some older boys had attacked him. When Boyd and Daniel see them, they turn around and run away with the stolen street sign. Max Hoyland (Stephen Lovatt) finds out about the stolen sign and tells the boys to put it back. He then arranges for a friend to make one for them. Boyd becomes suspicious about the bruise on Daniel's face and Daniel admits that his father had hit him. Boyd is concerned, but does not know what to do. One night, Daniel turns up at Boyd's home looking for a place to stay for the night. Max goes with Daniel to pick up some things from his house and he tells Daniel's father, Edward (Terry Brittingham), what is happening. He also mentions that he should get some help. Daniel and Boyd spy on the Scully bathroom and when Harold Bishop (Ian Smith) catches them, they tell him they are bird-watching and Harold shows them his ornithology books. Max later grounds them. Boyd's sister, Summer (Marisa Siketa) likes Daniel and she is devastated when he returns home. Edward was attending counselling sessions and tried to change his ways. Boyd and Daniel spread a rumour that Taj Coppin (Jaime Robbie Reyne) had slept with Libby Kennedy (Kym Valentine). Daniel teases Boyd about his relationship with Sky Mangel (Stephanie McIntosh), which does not impress her, but Boyd decides that it is time they took their relationship further.

== Lori Lee ==
Lori Lee, played by Michelle Ang, made her first on-screen appearance on 20 November 2002. Ang was nineteen when she joined the cast of Neighbours as Lori and she had to move to Melbourne for filming. Ang became one of the first Asian actors to receive a prominent role in the show. Lori is described as being a "rebel."

== Taj Coppin ==
Taj Coppin
- Neighbours character
- Portrayed by: Jaime Robbie Reyne
- Duration: 2002–2004
- First appearance: 27 November 2002
- Last appearance: 23 January 2004
- Introduced by: Stanley Walsh
In-universe information
- Occupation: Student; Waiter; Swimming instructor
- Sisters: Tahnee Coppin

Taj Coppin, played by Jaime Robbie Reyne, made his first appearance on 27 November 2002. Reyne joined the cast of Neighbours around the same time as Jay Bunyan and Michelle Ang. The new cast members were dubbed part of the "new generation". Reyne commented, "People are making a big deal of that because we've all come in at once, and there are people like Holly Valance (Flick Scully) leaving. But I don't feel any pressure. I'm Jaime Robbie – not a replacement for anyone else. So I guess you could say we're the new breed but we're a different breed!" Taj is the brother of Tahnee Coppin, and the captain of Erinsborough High's football team. He was introduced as a love interest for Nina Tucker (Delta Goodrem). Taj sends Nina text messages, but denies being the sender when she asks him. Reyne explained that although his character is the football captain, he is "very shy" and worries that Nina will reject him. Reyne also described him as "a nice bloke – very sensitive and thoughtful towards other people." The character later becomes involved in a love quadrangle.

Reyne filmed his final scenes in September 2003, and they aired the following year. Of his departure, Reyne said "I don't regret doing Neighbours, but the main reason I did leave was because everyone had warned me I'd be known as that character for life." The BBC said Taj's most notable moment was "His reaction to the news that Jack and Nina were having an affair." Ruth Deller of television website Lowculture said Taj was a character nobody cared about.

Taj attends Erinsborough High and becomes the captain of the football team. He catches Nina Tucker's attention after she begins receiving mysterious text messages. When Nina receives a text message minutes after seeing Taj, she confronts him. However, Taj denies sending the messages. He and Nina decide to go out on a date though. When Nina gets a message asking to meet her at the rotunda, Taj tells her that he will go with her and hide in the bushes. Nina is surprised to see Taj with a picnic hamper and he reveals that he did send the messages. They go away to the beach and Nina asks if he has a girlfriend, because Michelle Scully (Kate Keltie) told her that he did. Taj explains that he was dating a girl called Allie, but she moved away. Taj gets involved in the community play building props and fails to notice the romantic tension between Nina and Jack Scully (Jay Bunyan). Allie (Jessica Monaghan) comes to stay with Taj's family for a while, which worries Nina. However, she meets Allie and realises that she has nothing to worry about and Taj tells Allie that they will always be friends. Taj then tells Jack that he really loves Nina.

Taj believes his relationship with Nina is going well and he buys her a ring, but he is surprised when she does not accept it. Taj is shocked when Nina suddenly breaks up with him. He relies on Lori Lee (Michelle Ang) for support. While they are messing around at the local swimming pool, Lori slips and hits her head, resulting in her becoming paralysed. Taj feels guilty about the incident and begins to avoid his old friends. Taj goes to the pub with a fake ID, but is caught by student teacher Libby Kennedy (Kym Valentine). Libby suggests that Taj get some counselling. He starts to talk to Nina again and gets a job at Lassiter's. Taj makes up with Lori and Jack, who he starts coaching the junior girls soccer team with. Taj turns to Libby for some tutoring as his grades had slipped. They spend a lot of time together and when Libby gets some teaching work at Erinsborough High, it becomes clear that Taj sees her more than just a tutor. While Taj and Libby are editing his media work, Taj leans over and kisses her. Libby makes it clear that their relationship could never be more than teacher and student, but Taj does not listen.

On his 18th birthday, he drags Jack to a club after discovering Libby would be there. Taj walks Libby home and she kisses him. They later sleep together. Taj is upset when Libby avoids him and when the news about them is spread around Erinsborough, Libby leaves town. Taj goes to the country to see Libby, but when he sees her playing with her son, he realises that he needs to move on. Taj starts dating Edwina Valdez (Lucia Smyrk), but when she admits that she slept with Jack, Taj ends things between them. He begins listening to Stuart Parker (Blair McDonough) and attending a group called Life Mechanics. After a while he starts to question the ideas behind Life Mechanics and walks out on a meeting. He tries to convince Stuart to leave the group too and Stuart throws him out of Number 30, where he had been staying since his parents moved away. Susan Kennedy (Jackie Woodburne) offers him a room at the Kennedy house. Taj and Jack decide to get copies of exam papers, but they tell each other that they did not use them. Weeks later, the Erinsborough News reports on the stolen exam papers and when Taj scores in the top three percent of the school, Toadfish Rebecchi (Ryan Moloney) becomes suspicious. Toadie confronts Taj, who admits that he cheated. He then withdraws from the film school that he had got into. When film-maker Sam Tinselman (Sylvia Petrice) comes to town, Toadie and Stuart make her watch Taj's film and Sam gives him a job as a runner on her next film. Taj then leaves Erinsborough.

== Others ==
Date(s)	Character	Actor	Circumstances
6–19 February	Cherry Fox	Anya Trybala	Cherry is a classmate of Tad Reeves at Eden Hills University. Tad invites her and some other friends over to listen to music. Tad asks Harold Bishop if Cherry can stay for the night as she missed her bus and he agrees. The next morning, Cherry thanks Tad for a fun night before saying goodbye. Cherry later comes over to help Tad with his music homework and they go out to a club. Tad has to tell Harold that he and Cherry are just friends.
11–12 February	Gregori	Peter Prenga	Gregori is a refugee who is found hiding out in Lou Carpenter's house while he is away. He is soon discovered by Michelle Scully, Leo and Emily Hancock, who assume he is a burglar. Gregori invents a story that he is a friend of Lou's but quickly admits the truth. Michelle and Leo sneak him food, but Michelle's father Joe is suspicious and soon finds Gregori staying and calls immigration. Gregori chooses to run on the advice of Michelle, but he then decides to turn himself in and is subsequently deported.
15 February–16 April	Keith Cox	Geoff Brooks	Keith is the head of Keith Cox and Associates where trainee lawyers Toadfish Rebecchi and Maggie Hancock begin their placements. Keith's office is small and untidy. Keith later reveals that there are no other associates. He represents Maggie's stepson Matt in court on charges of reckless driving. Matt's bail is refused and he is remanded in custody.
4–11 March	Andy Cooke	Michael Wannenmacher	Andy is the head chef at Lassiter's Hotel. Marc Lambert turns to Andy for help in romancing Stephanie Scully. Andy presents a meal served in the kitchen of the hotel, featuring his famous rabbit terrine. Later, Marc uses Andy's knowledge of wine to impress Steph and eventually her sister Felicity.
13 March–2 May	Terri Hall	Robyn Charlesworth	Terri moves into the flat above Libby Kennedy and Drew Kirk. Stuart Parker and Drew go to the garage after getting a call about someone hanging around. The police arrive and Drew is tackled by Terri who reveals that she is undercover. When Matt Hancock is involved in a car accident that leaves Glen Bushby seriously injured and Harold Bishop temporarily blinded, Terri follows his toung brother Leo to find him. Terri dates Darcy Tyler, but ends the relationship when he follows her into a drugs bust. She is later transferred.
13–27 March	Pat Scully	Gerard Kennedy	Pat is the father of Mick, Tom and Joe Scully. He took his anger out on them and their mother. Joe subsequently found it hard to maintain a relationship with his father. Pat arrives in Ramsay Street to visit Joe and his grandchildren. Lyn Scully encourages Joe and Pat to build bridges and they sit down to talk. Pat admits that he may have gone too far with the punishments before he leaves. Mick goes to help Pat with his farm in Bendigo and Joe later goes to help them both when they are involved in a serious accident. Pat's health grows worse and he dies.
22 March–3 April	Glen Bushby	Nathaniel Marshall	Glen and Matt Hancock have a drag race, and Glen later taunts Matt about his car stalling. Stuart Parker bets Glen that Matt can beat him in another race. Glen and Matt race and Matt wins. They race again weeks later for more money, but an accident leaves both Matt and Glen injured. Matt sees a priest entering Glenn's hospital room and he flees. Glen's father reveals that Glen may never walk again.
2–11 April	Tracey Slattery	Christine Wools	Tracey was engaged to Stuart Parker, but she cheated on him with his best friend. Tracey arrives in Erinsborough to see Stuart and ask for a second chance. Stuart tells her to leave, but Tracey refuses to give up on him. Tracey bumps into Dee Bliss and they talk about Stuart, Tracey tells Dee that he is the only man for her. She refuses to leave, but when Stuart tells her that he does not hate her and that they can still be friends, she goes back home.
3 April	Colin Barclay	Paul Glen	Colin is the brother of Rosie Hoyland. Rosie invites him to Lou's Place for dinner, so she can wind up Harold Bishop and Lou Carpenter. She tells them that her relationship with Colin is long-standing and much more than friendship, before admitting that he is her brother.
5 April–21 May	John Lambert	Barry O'Connor	John and his wife, Chloe buy Lassiter's Hotel. When his son, Marc begins dating Stephanie Scully, John and Chloe meet her parents and John talk with Joe Scully. He and Chloe are shocked when they discover that Marc and Steph are engaged. John later asks Chloe for a divorce.
10 April	Ian Conway	Peter Maver	When Karl and Susan Kennedy decide to look for their niece, Elly's, real father, they hire a private eye and find Ian's details. Ian calls Elly and tells her that he is going overseas, so he wants to see her. Ian talks to Karl and Susan and then tells Elly that he is not her biological father. He explains that Elly's mother, Liz, told him that Karl was her father. Liz later reveals that Ian is actually Elly's father.
22 April–8 May	Neil Walden	Aleks Vass	Neil is a QC who is hired by the Hancock family to defend Matt against reckless driving charges. He informs Matt's father, Evan, and stepmother, Maggie, that bail will be expensive as Matt previously fled and suggests that Matt pleads guilty to a lesser charge. Neil gets Matt's charge downgraded and outlines a plan to paint Glen Bushby as the villain and for Matt to take up some community work. The Hancock's are forced to sell their home in order to fund legal costs and Neil succeeds in defending Matt who escapes a prison sentence.
22 April	Roger Bushby	D.J. Foster	Roger is Glen's father. He comes to Ramsay Street to see Matt Hancock. He blames Matt for Glen's injuries, which were sustained during a drag racing accident. He informs Matt and his father, Evan, that Glen may never walk again.
29 April	Damian Slattery	David Lyons	Damian is Tracey's brother. Damian tricks Stuart Parker into running outside of his house in nothing but a towel and then handcuffs him to his car in revenge for Stuart dumping Tracey at the altar. He then warns Stuart to stay away from Tracey.
6–17 May	Amelia Moon	Katie Reilly	Amelia takes her car to be serviced at Carpenters Mechanics by Stuart Parker and meets Darcy Tyler who also books his car in. They begin talking and agree to a date, much to the annoyance of Stuart, who has shown interest in Amelia. However, Darcy loses interest in Amelia as the date nears and when Penny Watts twists her ankle at the Coffee Shop and Darcy treats her, Amelia leaves after being ignored.
30 May–17 June	Richard Knott	Scottie Cameron	Richard assumes Tad Reeves' identity after stealing his passport and other documents. He runs up several thousands of dollars in debt in Tad's name. Tad's friend Connor O'Neill tries to tackle Richard, but he gets away. It soon emerges that Richard is working with Doula Tsobanopoulos, Tad's former employer. When Tad confronts Richard, he runs off and Tad chases him into the night. Tad's guardian, Harold Bishop receives a call from Erinsborough Hospital telling him Tad has died after being hit by a car. When Harold arrives to identify the body, he finds the body is that of Richard who had died while in possession of Tad's documents and Tad emerges alive and well.
26 June – 20 October 2005	Karen Buckley	Maya Walker	Karen is a teacher at Erinsborough High. She helps Susan Kennedy out on her return to teaching. She later tries to chat up Tom Scully, she is not happy to hear that he is a priest.
3 July–4 September	Ray Milsome	Tom Meadmore	When Stuart Parker joins the army, Ray becomes his senior. Ray comes to Ramsay Street on leave and stays on Dee Bliss and Toadfish Rebecchi's sofa. Ray falls for Dee. He later announces that he is leaving the army and moving to Erinsborough. Stuart walks out on the army and he and Ray get jobs at the hospital. Ray decides to back off from Dee and he meets Nina Tucker. He believes she is at university, but during their first date, Ray realises she is still in school. When he left alone with Dee, Ray tries to force himself on her and only stops when Felicity Scully arrives. After Toadie learns what happened between Ray and Dee, he publicly chastises Ray in the pub, who then leaves town.
11 July–27 August	Saxon Garvey	Troy Lovett	Saxon and his mother, Isabella, move into Number 32. Saxon spends most of his evenings eating lasagne in the Coffee Shop. When Harold Bishop came to visit the house, Saxon would always tell him that his mother is in her room working. Dee Bliss recognises Saxon and it is revealed that Isabella is a patient at the hospital. When Isabella dies, Harold takes Saxon in and he becomes friends with Boyd Hoyland. Saxon's father arrives and wants to send him to boarding school, he leaves for Sydney, but vows to come back for Saxon. Max Hoyland plans to rent out Number 32, which upsets Saxon and he throws black paint over the walls in the living room. He eventually owns up and agrees to help repair the damage. Roger returns and Saxon leaves with him. The BBC said Saxon's most notable moment was "Defacing the wall at number 32."
11 July–16 August	Craig Benson	Tim Hughes	When Susan Kennedy is diagnosed with retrograde amnesia and believes she is sixteen, she runs away to her former boyfriend, Craig's farm. Susan's daughter Libby and son-in-law Drew Kirk find Craig and ask if he has seen Susan. He lies to them that he has not. Craig later brings Susan home and apologises to her family for lying to them. He tells Karl Kennedy that he has no intention of stealing her away. A few days later, Susan calls Craig and asks him to collect her. Karl invited Craig for dinner and Susan announces that she wants a divorce. Craig believes her actions are selfish and he later decide to go back to the farm alone.
15 August	Jamie Kane	Chris Hemsworth	Jamie works at car parts wholesaler Moco. He finds his co-worker Stephanie Scully after the place is robbed and questions Steph as to why she did not press the alarm button. He calls the police himself and Steph is left needing to clear her name after it emerges she knew the robber.
29 August – 17 May 2006	Rose Belker	Esme Melville	Rose is an elderly woman who is hard of hearing. She is a frequent visitor to Karl Kennedy's surgery and when her health problems get worse, she spends time in the hospital. Lyn Scully offers to give her a makeover and Rose has to be talked out of dying her hair blue. Rose is allowed home following an operation. Rose visits Toadfish Rebecchi to talk about giving her son-in-law power of attorney. Rose finds Darcy Tyler at the bottom of a staircase and she calls the police, she later attends a lingerie party in Ramsay Street. Rose goes back to hospital and talks to a depressed Paul Robinson, after he loses his leg. Rose gets a ticket from parking inspector Ned Parker and she begs him to reconsider the fine. Ned rips the ticket up and invites Rose to join him for coffee.
20 September–1 October	Michael Toohey	Angus McLaren	Michael is a member of the local cricket club which Boyd Hoyland and Adam Stevens attend. He is surprised when Boyd hits the ball for six.
18 October–12 December	Martin Cook	Tony Bonner	Martin is a renowned surgeon and a friend to Darcy Tyler. Martin begins working at the hospital as a locum and his first patients are Ben Kirk and Summer Hoyland. He starts a series of workshops and nurse Sheena Wilson becomes desperate to get onto the courses. She tries to impress Martin, but she is left off the list of attendees. Martin tells Sheena that she will be on the list, if she makes it worth his while. She refuses and Martin begins picking on her. He tries to kiss Dee Bliss and she reports him for sexual harassment. Dee and Martin later argue and Darcy overhears Martin mention that he made a pass at Dee. Darcy talks with Martin and records him admitting what he did. Darcy warns Martin that he will go to the hospital board. Martin apologises to Dee and he is transferred to another hospital.
18 October–2 December	Jordan Lambert	Hannah Jankiewicz	Jordan is the youngest child of Chloe and John Lambert. Jordan comes to Erinsborough after learning that the family home had been broken into. Jordan meets Darcy Tyler and she warns him not to take advantage of her mother. Jordan warns Darcy that her parents might be getting back together, but Darcy refuses to end his relationship with Chloe. Jordan lies to Chloe that Darcy came on to her and then has him beaten up. Chloe is shocked when Jordan admits she hired someone to scare Darcy. Jordan then leaves for Sydney.
31 October – 7 July 2003	Heather Green	Megan Harrington	Boyd Hoyland meets Heather at a camp for gifted children and they begin a relationship. Boyd's sister, Summer, blackmails Heather and Boyd with a photo of them just about to kiss. Boyd starts showing off to his friends about kissing Heather, and she dumps him. Boyd apologizes, and they get back together. Heather asks Boyd to her school formal, and they later have a party at his home. Heather dumps Boyd again when he starts acting up and ruins her birthday dinner. He takes a car and drives to her house, but Heather tells him that she is not going to get into a stolen car with an under age driver.
