= List of Neighbours characters introduced in 2000 =

Neighbours is an Australian television soap opera. It was created by Reg Watson and first broadcast on 18 March 1985. The following is a list of characters that first appeared in the soap in 2000, by order of first appearance. All characters were introduced by the show's executive producer Stanley Walsh. The 16th season of Neighbours began airing from 17 January 2000. Blair Venn began appearing as Brendan Bell in the same month. Dee Bliss made her first appearance in February, while Sheena Wilson and Gino Esposito were introduced in August. September saw Allana Truman make her debut. Siblings Emily and Leo Hancock arrived in October. Darcy Tyler and Larry Woodhouse started appearing from November.

== Brendan Bell ==
Brendan Bell
- Neighbours character
- Portrayed by: Blair Venn
- First appearance: 19 January 2000
- Last appearance: 28 June 2000
- Introduced by: Stanley Walsh
In-universe information
- Occupation: Lawyer
- Wife: Teresa Bell (until 2000)

Brendan Bell, played by Blair Venn, made his first screen appearance on 19 January 2000. Brendan was married to Teresa Bell (Krista Vendy) and he was often violent towards her. Vendy revealed that Brendan physically and mentally abused Tess and she became desperate to get away from him. When the Kennedy family ask Tess to move in with them, she made the decision to leave Brendan. Of Tess and Brendan's marriage, Vendy said "Teresa is a very strong woman, but she has lost a lot of her confidence during the abusive marriage. She is only 24 years old and she looks up to Brendan because he is 11 years her senior and is a successful lawyer. Sadly, he only sees her as a trophy." Brendan came to see Tess and tried to talk his way back into her affections. Vendy stated that despite Brendan's past behaviour, Tess wanted her marriage to work and her stubbornness kept her going back. Tess believed Brendan when he said that he would change and her friends became concerned when she allowed Brendan back into her life. Tess was unaware that Brendan was "playing a double game." Despite being sincere around his wife, she was unaware that he had turned on a few people and displayed a split personality. One night, "a highly jealous" Brendan got into his car and sped through the rain to try to find Tess, he then crashed into Libby Kennedy (Kym Valentine) and Stephanie Scully (Carla Bonner).

Brendan is a lawyer married to high school teacher, Teresa. Brendan is older than Tess and he often abuses her. Brendan learns his Tess is leaving him when he finds her packing up her belongings. Brendan becomes angry, but does not show his emotions, so it makes Tess' accusations against him look bad. Brendan continues to put on a front and when he meets Susan Kennedy (Jackie Woodburne) at the Coffee Shop, he tells her Tess has been emotionally unstable ever since her mother died. Brendan informs Tess that he is going to attend anger management classes and he later tells her that he has changed. Tess is wary, but Brendan becomes a part of her new life and she starts relying on him more and more. Tess is impressed when Brendan backs away from a fight at the local pub and starts to believe that he has changed. Brendan cooks dinner for Tess one night and his car fails to start, so he spends the night on the sofa.

After a week away on business, Brendan returns and he and Tess go on a couple of dates. When Paul McClain (Jansen Spencer) narrowly misses hitting Brendan with his bike, Brendan becomes enraged by the incident. Susan sees him and tells Tess, but she refuses to listen. Brendan asks Tess to get back together with him and move home. He also reveals that he has to go away on business again, so he gives her five weeks to answer him. On his return, Brendan learns that Tess is still living in Ramsay Street. When he finds out she has gone dancing with Daniel Fitzgerald (Brett Tucker), Brendan flies into a jealous rage and rushes to confront her. On his way, Brendan hits Libby Kennedy and Steph Scully with his car. Brendan is taken to the hospital and charged by the police with causing the accident. Brendan begs Tess for forgiveness. Shortly afterwards, an undetected internal injury causes Brendan to have a fatal heart attack.

== Dee Bliss ==
Dione "Dee" Bliss, played by Madeleine West, made her first screen appearance on 3 February 2000. West was studying law at university when she decided to get an agent and try acting. She received the role of Dee shortly afterwards. West deferred her law degree studies after she won the role. When Dee became popular with viewers, the serial's producers made her a regular cast member and offered West a new contract. Jim Schembri of The Age said Dee was "Ramsay Street's reigning blonde beauty." In 2001, West was nominated for the Most Popular New Female Talent Logie Award for her portrayal of Dee.

== Sheena Wilson ==
Sheena Wilson
- Neighbours character
- Portrayed by: Zoe Stark
- Duration: 2000–2006
- First appearance: 10 August 2000
- Last appearance: 12 October 2006
- Introduced by: Stanley Walsh
In-universe information
- Occupation: Nurse
- Mother: Rhonda Wilson

Sheena Wilson, played by Zoe Stark, made her first screen appearance on 10 August 2000. Sheena was a friend of Dee Bliss (Madeleine West), who became a love interest for Toadfish Rebecchi (Ryan Moloney). Sheena and Toadie later suffered problems with their relationship when Toadie revealed to Sheena that her mother, Rhonda (Brenda Addie), had attempted to seduce him. Another notable storyline for Sheena saw her accuse Martin Cook (Tony Bonner) of victimisation, when he refused her a place in one of his workshops.

Sheena is a nurse at Erinsborough Hospital, who becomes good friends with Dee Bliss. Sheena helps out when Lou Carpenter (Tom Oliver) suffers a back injury and when Lyn Scully (Janet Andrewartha) gives birth to her son. Dee tries to set Sheena up with both Lance Wilkinson (Andrew Bibby) and Toadfish Rebecchi. Sheena later agrees to go on a date with Toadie, who convinces himself that she accepted for a bet. However, Sheena tells Toadie that she is genuinely interested in him and they begin spending more time together. Toadie agrees to help Sheena's mother, Rhonda, out with some work around her house. Rhonda begins flirting with Toadie and he becomes uncomfortable around her, but does not tell Sheena. When Rhonda continues to flirt with Toadie, he eventually informs Sheena about her mother's behaviour towards him. The couple decide that they cannot trust each other enough and break up. The following year, Sheena applies for a place in one of Martin Cook's lectures. Martin sexually harasses Sheena and when she accuses him of victimisation, she is left alienated at work. Sheena leaves Martin's workshop and goes on holiday. Her accusations against Martin are proven when Dee also becomes his target.

A couple of years later, Sheena is on duty when Boyd Hoyland (Kyal Marsh) ends up in a coma, after having a brain tumour removed. Sheena tells Boyd's family that they should prepare for the worst. Sheena attends her high school reunion at the Scarlet Bar and becomes annoyed when she learns that Sindi Watts (Marisa Warrington), works there. Sheena tries to tell the owner to sack Sindi, who overhears. Sindi's boyfriend, Stuart Parker (Blair McDonough), confronts Sheena and her friends about bullying Sindi. However, Sheena explains that it is not true and he should watch his back around Sindi. The following day, Stuart comes to speak with Sheena and she tells him that Sindi used to steal other girls' boyfriends at school. She also tells him to talk to Kelly Weaver (Simone Ray), but refuses to elaborate any further. Sheena is transferred to the psychiatric ward and helps to treat Max Hoyland (Stephen Lovatt). Max starts to believe that everyone is out to get him and when his family come to take him home, Sheena informs them that Max is being kept in. When Boyd and Stephanie Scully (Carla Bonner) return to take him home, Sheena helps them out with some release forms and they go to collect Max. Sheens explains that Max has just had his medication and may be asleep, but when they get to his room they find he has gone.

== Gino Esposito ==
Gino Esposito, played by Claude Stevens, made his first screen appearance on 11 August 2000. The character was later recast with the role going to Shane McNamara. Gino was a hairdresser who ran the local hair salon. He was gay and in a relationship with Aaron Barkley (Stewart Adam). Of Gino, script producer, Luke Devenish, said "He is a [gay] stereotype, and we don't have a problem with that as he is not a negative stereotype, he is a comic charter and it is for a laugh – in the Mr Humphries [of Are You Being Served?] kind of tradition". When Gino briefly moved in with Harold Bishop (Ian Smith), the writers decided to tweak the "standard love triangle" with Lou Carpenter (Tom Oliver) becoming jealous of the duo.

== Allana Truman ==
Allana Truman
- Neighbours character
- Portrayed by: Josephine Clark
- Duration: 2000–2001
- First appearance: 29 September 2000
- Last appearance: 29 March 2001
- Introduced by: Stanley Walsh
In-universe information
- Occupation: Student
- Mother: Jeannie Truman
- Sisters: Clementine Truman

Allana Truman (née Dorothy Truman), played by Josephine Clark, made her first screen appearance on 29 September 2000. Clark had a three-month guest contract, she previously appeared in the serial as Jamie-Lee Duggan in 1997. Allana was described as being "an eccentric girl" by a writer for the BBC's Neighbours website. She became a love interest for Lance Wilkinson (Andrew Bibby) and the writer noted that both Lance and Allana shared a passion for science fiction.

Allana meets Lance Wilkinson (Andrew Bibby) at a science fiction convention and they are attracted to each other. In order to date her, Allana asks Lance to complete seven labours. Lance's first task is to find the final episode of a television show from the local library and convert it into video. He then has to find Allana's favourite retired actor and have a photo taken with him. Lance finds the actor in a nursing home and he manages to con his way in to meet him and get the photo. For the third labour, Allana asks Lance to make a sci-fi film and he has to rope in some of his friends and neighbours to help. Allana burns a strange symbol into the grass in Ramsay Street and gets Lance to decipher it. For the fifth labour, Lance has to convince Libby Kennedy (Kym Valentine) that UFOs are real and get her to publish a newspaper article about it. Allana asks Lance to present the article to her at her house, while he wears a ceremonial outfit. For the seventh and final labour, Allana asks Lance to bring her a piece of a crashed satellite, which proves difficult. Lance decides to create his own piece of the satellite, which impresses Allana. She and Lance finally become a couple and they have sex together for the first time.

Allana's strange behaviour causes Lance to question how well he knows her and she eventually admits that she lives with her mother. Allana's sister, Clementine (Melanie Lockman), also reveals that Allana changed her name from Dorothy. The sister's mother, Jeannie (Libby Stone), tries to stop Allana's relationship with Lance, as she fears that she will lose her daughter's company. Jeannie is possessive of Allana and explains that she needs her around as she is sick. Allana begs her mother not to make her choose between her and Lance, but she ends up breaking up with Lance. She soon realises that she has made a mistake and begs Lance for his help in escaping Jeannie. They make plans to go travelling in the United States and visit a sci-fi convention while they are there. Lance sells his ute, but he and Allana still struggle to raise the money they need. Lance enters a radio quiz and proves popular with the listeners. The producers try to keep Lance on the show by revealing that they will feed him the answers for the next round. When Allana finds out and threatens to leave him, Lance exposes the scam live on air. Allana and Lance leave Erinsborough and they later start up their own sci-fi convention.

== Emily Hancock ==
Emily Hancock
- Neighbours character
- Portrayed by: Isabella Oldham
- Duration: 2000–2002
- First appearance: 11 October 2000
- Last appearance: 9 May 2002
- Introduced by: Stanley Walsh
In-universe information
- Occupation: Student
- Father: Evan Hancock
- Mother: Maggie Hancock
- Brothers: Leo Hancock
- Sisters: Francesca Hancock
- Half-brothers: Matt Hancock; Chris Hancock

Emily Hancock, played by Isabella Oldham, made her first screen appearance on 11 October 2000. Emily was later reintroduced to the serial the following year, along with her family. The writers created the five strong Hancock family to help fill a void left by the temporary departures of six regular characters. The Hancock's were "a noisy, five-strong group who quickly make their presence felt." They were also "fun-loving" and "just your average Aussie family." In 2002, the entire Hancock family was written out of Neighbours. A writer for the BBC's Neighbours website commented that Emily's most notable moment was "Finding a love letter written by Toadie to Maggie Hancock." While reviewing the Hancock family's first episode, Jackie Brygel of the Herald Sun branded Emily the "cute daughter".

Emily and her brother, Leo (Josh Jay), are looked after by Karl (Alan Fletcher) and Susan Kennedy (Jackie Woodburne) for a few days while their mother is away. The following year, the children move to Ramsay Street with their family. Emily becomes upset when her favourite doll, Lizzie, disappears and she initially blames Leo. However, he denies taking the doll and he and Emily later see it in a local shop owned by Collector Bob (Henry Ismailiw). Instead of telling their parents, Emily and Leo try to get the doll back themselves. However, just when they think they have gotten away with it, Bob catches them. Fortunately for the children, their mother, Maggie (Sally Cooper), arrives and warns Bob off of claiming the doll as his. Emily and her doll are reunited, but Maggie is angry that she and Leo went behind her back. Some removal men deliver the wrong box to the Hancock house and Maggie plans to return it the following day. Emily opens the box and takes a pair of earrings for herself. When the real owners get their box back, they accuse the Hancocks of theft and Emily owns up to taking and losing the earrings.

Leo shouts at Emily and blames her for the family's problems. This causes Emily to run away and she boards a bus. Emily falls asleep and the driver does not notice her, leaving her stuck in the bus all night. In the morning, Emily runs away as soon as she can and the driver reports the incident. The police begin searching the bushland around the bus station, but Emily hides, believing she is going to be in a lot of trouble. Leo joins the search and when he calls Emily's name, she comes out of hiding and is reunited with her family. Emily complains of pain in her ear, but Karl finds there is nothing wrong. Emily continues to complain about the pain, but Karl notices her wince when she eats some ice cream and realises the problem is actually with her teeth. Emily begins talking about a new friend called Madge. Harold Bishop (Ian Smith) believes Emily is talking to his late wife and he is happy that he has a new link to her. Emily finds and reads out a letter from Toadfish Rebecchi (Ryan Moloney), which details his feelings for Maggie. The Hancock family are forced to move away due to financial troubles and on their last day in Erinsborough, Emily goes missing. However, she is found in the garden of Number 24, saying goodbye to Madge.

== Leo Hancock ==
Leo Hancock
- Neighbours character
- Portrayed by: Josh Jay (2000); Anthony Hammer (2001–2002)
- Duration: 2000–2002
- First appearance: 11 October 2000
- Last appearance: 9 May 2002
- Introduced by: Stanley Walsh
In-universe information
- Occupation: Student
- Father: Evan Hancock
- Mother: Maggie Hancock
- Sisters: Francesca Hancock; Emily Hancock
- Half-brothers: Matt Hancock; Chris Hancock

Leo Hancock, played by Anthony Hammer, made his first screen appearance on 11 October 2000. The character was played by Josh Jay, before Leo was reintroduced to the serial the following year, along with his family. The writers created the five strong Hancock family to help fill a void left by the temporary departures of six regular characters. The Hancock's were "a noisy, five-strong group who quickly make their presence felt." They were also "fun-loving" and "just your average Aussie family." In 2002, the entire Hancock family was axed from Neighbours.

Leo and his sister, Emily (Isabella Oldham), are looked after by Karl (Alan Fletcher) and Susan Kennedy (Jackie Woodburne) for a few days while their mother is away. The following year, the children move to Ramsay Street with their family. Leo immediately goes missing, but turns up at the local pub where his brother, Matt works. When he fails to find Matt, Leo gets a lift home from his new neighbour Toadfish Rebecchi (Ryan Moloney). Leo's friend, Aleks Rama (Dean Ali), shows up in Ramsay Street and reveals that Leo arranged for him to stay with the family while his parents are on holiday. Leo worries about his parents when the anniversary of his sister, Francesca's, death arrives. Leo handles the anniversary badly, as he blames himself for her death. He speaks with Dee Bliss (Madeleine West) about his guilt at leaving the pool gate open, which led to Francesca falling into the pool and drowning. Dee tells Leo not to blame himself and helps cope with his role in his sister's death. Leo starts attending Erinsborough High and P.E. teacher, Dean Hearn (Jason Buckley), starts bullying Leo. Leo tells Matt, who tells their parents Evan (Nicholas Opolski) and Maggie (Sally Cooper). Evan witnesses Dean bullying his son and tells the principal, Susan Kennedy (Jackie Woodburne). She later sees Dean throw a chalk duster at Leo, which cuts his forehead and Dean resigns from the school.

When Leo shouts at Emily one day, she later goes missing. Leo feels guilty and he helps to find her. Evan and Maggie learn that Leo has been writing and selling essays to other students. Leo confesses that he has been using the money to take break-dancing lessons and Evan and Maggie ban him from taking any more. Leo wants to dance in a regional break-dancing competition and sneaks out of his house. Matt catches Leo and agrees not to tell their parents. Evan sees Leo dance and realising that his son is talented, he agrees to let him join a dance crew. Leo and Michelle Scully (Kate Keltie) find an illegal immigrant called Gregori (Peter Prenga) and they agree to keep his presence a secret. Leo bonds with Gregori as they spend more time together. Michelle's father later finds Gregori and calls the police, who make sure he returns to his own country. When Leo's break-dancing crew get through to the dance finals in Adelaide, Evan refuses to let him go with them. Leo and his crew try to raise the money for the trip themselves, which angers Evan. Leo thinks about sneaking away and going to Adelaide by himself, but he eventually decides not to. When Leo learns that Matt is competing in a drag race against Glen Bushby (Nathaniel Marshall), he asks to sit in the passenger seat. During the race, Matt loses control of the car and crashes. Leo and Matt only suffer minor injuries and Matt later goes on the run from the police. Leo learns where Matt has gone and helps him out by bringing him food. Matt returns home and hands himself into the police. His legal fees prove to be expensive, so Evan and Maggie sell the house and the family move to Albury.

A writer for the BBC's Neighbours website commented that Leo's most notable moment was "Keeping his brother's whereabouts a secret after the car accident."

== Darcy Tyler ==
Darcy Tyler, played by Mark Raffety, made his first screen appearance on 15 November 2000. Darcy is Susan Kennedy's (Jackie Woodburne) nephew and a doctor. He was a "baddie", who often brought grief to the Kennedy family. Of his role, Raffety said "I am a character actor, so one of the reasons I have stuck with Darcy for three years is that there has been an opportunity to develop the character." For his portrayal of Darcy, Raffety earned nominations for Best Newcomer and Best Bad Boy at the Inside Soap Awards.

== Larry Woodhouse ==
Larry Woodhouse
- Neighbours character
- Portrayed by: Andrew Curry
- Duration: 2000–2002, 2010
- First appearance: 24 November 2000
- Last appearance: 30 September 2010
- Introduced by: Stanley Walsh (2000); Susan Bower (2010)
In-universe information
- Occupation: Mechanic; Bouncer
- Mother: Eileen

Larry "Woody" Woodhouse, played by Andrew Curry, made his first screen appearance on 24 November 2000. Curry appeared on a recurring basis as Woody until 2002. Woody was Stephanie Scully's ex-boyfriend, who lost touch with her when he was sent to prison. Woody later contacted Steph and asked for her help as he was being blackmailed. Shortly after he was released from prison, Woody revealed that he had to go into witness protection and asked Steph to come with him. Steph initially declined, but decided to run away with Woody. On their way, Woody was involved in a car crash and Steph was left to believe that he had died. However, Woody returned a year later and learned that Steph was dating a guy he knew from prison, Mitch Foster (Hugh Sexton). Woody told Steph that Mitch was a murderer and she decided to move on from both of them. On 14 September 2010, it was announced that Curry had reprised his role. Woody returns "unexpectedly" and Steph starts spending as much time as she can with him. Of Woody's return, Bonner stated "While there isn't a romantic attraction there – not for Steph, at least – Woody does represent a time when she didn't have children and the responsibilities she has now. He becomes an escape from what is going on. Steph's trying to block out everything that's happened and Woody is helping her do that, to a degree."

Woody was dating Stephanie Scully when he was sent to prison for receiving stolen goods. Steph later contacted Woody to tell him that she and her family were moving to Erinsborough. Just over a year later, Woody sends Steph a letter and asks her to visit him in prison. Woody is threatened by Kev Kelly (Frank Kennedy) and blackmailed into helping out with a robbery. Woody manages to talk Steph into sponsoring him for day release and Woody borrows her motorbike to pick up some stolen goods for Kev. When Steph learns what Woody has done, she convinces him to go to the police. Woody agrees to testify against Kev and he is beaten up in prison. A few months later, Woody is paroled and he comes to stay with the Scully family. Woody regrets getting the family involved when someone throws a brick through their window. When Kev makes a threat against Woody in court, the police decide to place Woody in witness protection. Woody asks Steph to come with him, but she realises that she cannot leave her family and they say goodbye. Steph finds it difficult to live without Woody and when he sends her a postcard, she begins visiting him in secret. Woody later turns up at Steph's home and asks her to start a new life with him. She agrees, but when they set off, they realise they are being followed. At a service station, Steph calls her family and Woody then proposes to her. While Steph is getting some drinks, Woody's car is ambushed by Barry Burke (David Whitely) an associate of Kev's, who tells him to drive. As Woody drives the car over a hill, it crashes and explodes. Steph run over to find Woody, but is held back by a passing motorist. Believing Woody to be dead, a memorial service is held and Steph begins to move on with her life.

Steph begins dating Mitch Foster, a friend of Woody's from prison. She also starts receiving mysterious deposits in her bank account. Steph is shocked when Woody shows up on her doorstep. He tells her that he was thrown from the car and then decided to go into hiding, thus making sure Steph was safe. Woody explains that both Kev and Barry are now dead, so they can be together. Steph finds it hard to forgive Woody, even when he proposes again. When Woody learns that Steph is dating Mitch, he tells her that Mitch was in prison for murder. Steph then decides that she does not want to be with either man and asks them to leave. Eight Years later, Steph goes to collect her stepdaughter Summer Hoyland (Jordy Lucas) from a dance party and finds Woody working as a bouncer. Steph tells Woody that she is still living in Ramsay Street and Woody comes by the next day to see her. Steph decides to go off for a bike ride with Woody. Steph and Woody go to Charlie's bar together and Woody almost gets into a fight with Lucas Fitzgerald (Scott Major). Steph's mother, Lyn (Janet Andrewartha) becomes worried about Steph, who was suffering from post natal depression. Woody is unaware of Steph's state of mind and he reintroduces her to their old biker lifestyle. When Summer comes to Woody's place and reveals that Steph has recently given birth and that she has another child at home, Woody starts to become concerned for her. Lucas then turns up to talk to Steph, but she runs off.

A writer for the BBC's Neighbours website said Woody's most notable moment was "Returning from the dead! Turning up on the Scully doorstep after Steph thought he'd been killed in a car explosion." A reporter from the Sunday Mercury called Woody a "bad boy biker".

== Others ==
Date(s)	Character	Actor	Circumstances
27 January 2000 – 7 August 2003	Cecile Bliss	Molly McCaffrey	Cecile is Dee Bliss' younger sister, who initially comes to Ramsay Street with her friends to look for Joel Samuels, before Dee picks her up. When Michelle Scully begins attending Erinsborough High, Cecile bullies her. When Michelle tries to stand up for herself, she pushes Cecile causing her to fall and break her arm. Michelle is suspended, but on her return she has another confrontation with Cecile. Michelle tells her that her words no longer hurt her. Cecile is one of Dee's bridesmaids for her wedding to Toadfish Rebecchi and she later attends Dee's funeral. In 2017, a woman claiming to be Dee - whose body was never found - arrives in Ramsay Street. When it is suggested she should compare DNA samples with Cecile to prove her identity, 'Dee' reveals Cecile died a year ago after being knocked off her bike. Mark Brennan confirms the story and later obtains Cecile's DNA, as she was involved in a medical trial before her death. The woman claiming to be Dee is later revealed to be an impostor called Andrea Somers.
3–16 February	Vanessa Bradshaw	Julieanne Tait	Vanessa is Dee Bliss's friend. The women meet Joel Samuels and Toadfish Rebecchi while they are out for dinner one night. Joel claims to be a famous football player, while Toadie pretends to be a lawyer. Dee and Vanessa state that they are sisters. Dee is a model, while Vanessa is a fashion designer. Vanessa and Dee learn who Joel and Toadie really are and during a double date, they deliberately run up a large bill, which Joel and Toadie cannot afford.
11 February–5 April	Greg Mast	Roy Thompson	Billy Kennedy contacts carpenter Greg in the hope of a Carpentry apprenticeship in Queensland. Billy is initially disappointed when Greg tells him he works solo but remains optimistic when he tells him to stick at it. Eventually, Greg phones and offer Billy a position which he accepts. A month later, Greg sends Billy to pick up some Cedar wood from the train station. Billy arrives only to find no wood, but instead Anne Wilkinson who came to Queensland to join him.
25 February–17 April	Ivan Hart	Erik Donnison	Ivan is Lyn Scully's boss at the newly built A Good Hair Day' salon at the Lassiter's complex. Lyn soon realises that Ivan's business practices are shady and only appears to retrieve the takings. When the business' books fail to balance, Lyn is forced to pay the other stylists out of her own pocket. Lyn confronts Ivan but the argument is overheard by Lyn's husband, Joe who threatens Ivan who responds by sacking Lyn. Lyn works her final week, and is shocked when Ivan's wife Katrina announces that he has fled after to avoid his creditors after running up gambling debts. Lyn persuades Katrina to keep the salon open by her using her savings to keep the business going while Lyn does the hairdressing.
2 March–6 April	Carrie Clark	Vanessa Rossini	Carrie is Dee Bliss's friend. She betrays Dee by having an affair with her boyfriend, Joel Samuels.
3 March–2 June	Merridy Jackson	Suzi Cato	Lou Carpenter tries to meet with Merridy to discuss his daughter's unhappiness at her school. Merridy manages to rope Lou into helping out at the school's cake sale. Lou admits that he finds Merridy attractive and he asks her out on a date, which goes well. Lou goes to go to Queensland for a few weeks and on his return, he learns that Merridy is leaving for a new teaching post in the Northern Territory. Before she goes, Lou confesses that he is falling in love with her. Merridy agrees to return in six months if they still feel the same way about each other. Lou visits Merridy and realises that there is no future for them.
20 March–7 June	Simone King	Denise Briskin	Simone flirts with Paul McClain, but he rejects her advances and tells her he does not want a relationship. Paul becomes jealous when he learns that Simone is dating Tad Reeves. Paul and Simone later kiss and decide that they should tell Tad that they are together. However, Tad finds Simone and Paul together and begins feuding with Paul. Paul later decides to stop seeing Simone.
22 March–21 February 2001	Minnie Kirk	Marion Heathfield	Minnie is Drew Kirk's great aunt. She arrives in Erinsborough to meet Drew's girlfriend Libby Kennedy. She assumes they are engaged and encourages Libby to sew a patch onto the family quilt. Several months later, Minnie attends Drew and Libby's wedding
10 April 2000, 29 July–7 August 2003	Magda Bliss	Marilyn O'Donnell; June Jones	Magda visits Lyn Scully with her daughter, Cecile, whose arm was broken during a confrontation with Michelle Scully. Magda asks Michelle why has she been bullying her daughter. Michelle states that Cecile actually bullied her, but Madga does not believe her. Magda later attends her eldest daughter, Dee's wedding and then her funeral. In 2017, Dee's husband Toadfish Rebecchi reveals that Magda and her husband John died in a car accident 10 years earlier.
13–24 April	Rachel Jones	Kim Trengove	Tad Reeves meets Rachel at an adoption support group while looking for his biological mother. They share stories and Tad learns Rachel gave up her son and her partner died, much like Tad's biological father, which leads him to think she is his biological mother. However, Rachel reveals her partner died in an industrial accident, while Tad's father, Greg died in motorcycle accident. Before leaving, Rachel tells Tad she hopes she finds her son and he is like him.
18 April–9 May	Connie O'Rourke	Val Jellay	When their daughter, Lyn and her family move to Erinsborough, Connie and Henry decide to visit. When Connie and Henry discover the family is suffering from financial worries, they decide to leave to give the family some space. A few years later, Connie suffers a stroke and Lyn goes to be with her. She later dies and the family gather for her funeral. Henry visits Lyn and Joe and learns that Lyn has become aware that he and Connie are not her biological parents. Henry becomes angry with Valda Sheergold and tries to blame everything on her. It later emerges that Henry talked Charlie Cassidy into abandoning Valda, so he and Connie could adopt her daughter. Lyn and Henry's relationship deteriorates following the revelation, but they eventually make peace with each other.
18 April–15 October 2003	Henry O'Rourke	Bud Tingwell	
27 April	Janet Kirk	Roberta Connelly	Janet is Drew Kirk's aunt. She arrives to meet Drew's fiancée, Libby Kennedy. Libby is worried when she spills water on the Kirk family quilt while sewing her own patch and the quilt is later snatched off the line by the neighbours' dog, T-Rex. Janet and her sister-in-law, Rose, tell Libby stories of their own quilt mishaps.
5 May–6 June	Sean Edwards	Daniel Collopy	Sean meets Felicity Scully and they start dating, but have to keep their relationship a secret because he is older than her. Flick's father, Joe, catches them together and bans his daughter from seeing Sean. However, he later changes his mind and Sean is invited to dinner, where he upsets Flick's sister, Michelle. Joe later catches Flick and Sean in his house together and throws Sean out. Sean tells Flick that he cannot cope with her father anymore and breaks up with her. Sean asks Flick to get back together a few weeks later and she agrees. Sean takes Flick to the beach and states that they will have to stay overnight. Flick calls her father to pick her up and tells Sean that they are not right for each other.
9 May	Shanti Pandya	Menik Gooneratne	Shanti is a traveller who decides to stay at a hostel run by Toadfish Rebecchi, Lance Wilkinson and Joel Samuels. Shanti is impressed when she meets Joel, but is quickly confused when he tells her that the hostel has closed.
15 May–7 July	Rachel Bailey	Carolyn Bock	Rachel is Tad Reeves' biological mother, who gave him up for adoption after the death of her boyfriend. Years later, Tad tracks down Rachel and they meet up. They initially struggle to find anything in common and things get worse when Tad learns Rachel has a family that know nothing about her. Tad decides that he wants nothing more to do with Rachel. A few weeks later, Tad bumps into Rachel and she reveals that she was planning to call around to see him. When she does, Tad is surprised to when she gives him a birthday cake. A few months later, Tad learns from Rachel's husband Stephen that she has died.
16 May–25 July	Glenda Ryan	Bronwyn Di Cecco	Glenda is Maurie Ryan's wife. She visits Karl Kennedy at his surgery and believes her cancer is returning, as she has arm pains. Karl refers her to the hospital and she is given the all-clear. Several weeks later, Glenda collapses and tests reveal her tumour has returned. Maurie is enraged at Karl for misdiagnosing his wife and takes out a malpractice suit against him. After seeing how Maurie's persistence in the case is affecting Karl's standing in the community, Glenda drops the suit.
29 May–30 November	Stephen Bailey	Dean Murphy; Kevin Hopkins	Stephen is Rachel's husband. He comes to Ramsay Street to tell Rachel's son, Tad Reeves, that Rachel has died. He also reveals that his son, Tim, is ill and needs a bone marrow transplant. Tad agrees to help Tim out.
29 May–24 October	Jasmine Bailey	Chantelle Davies; Chloe Ellison	Jasmine and Tim are Rachel and Stephen's children. Tim develops a serious disease and needs a bone marrow transplant. Tim's half brother, Tad Reeves, agrees to help and they learn that he is a compatible donor. Tad and Tim bond and become good friends. The operation goes well and Tim makes a full recovery.
29 May–26 January 2001	Tim Bailey	Carl Lennie; Darcy Bonser	Jasmine and Tim are Rachel and Stephen's children. Tim develops a serious disease and needs a bone marrow transplant. Tim's half brother, Tad Reeves, agrees to help and they learn that he is a compatible donor. Tad and Tim bond and become good friends. The operation goes well and Tim makes a full recovery.
12 June	Dylan Ryan	Nicholas Colla	Dylan is the son of Maurie and Glenda Ryan. He appears when his father drops him off at school.
14–29 June	Bernie Samuels	Sean Scully	While he is in Melbourne, Bernie decides to spend time with his son, Joel. Bernie meets Dee Bliss and flirts with her, initially unaware that she is Joel's girlfriend. Bernie becomes popular with Joel's friends. He agrees to attend Joel's award ceremony at the university, but fails to turn up. Joel learns that Bernie has continued to flirt with Dee and realises that his father has never been there for him when it mattered. Bernie and Joel sit down to talk, but Bernie suddenly leaves the house. He later tells Joel that he does not want to face his responsibilities and they both realise that they will not have a perfect relationship. They hug and Bernie leaves.
29 June–17 July	Wendy Baker	Patsy Martin	Wendy arrives in Erinsborough when Harold Bishop is accused of an armed robbery committed by her partner, Alfie Doherty. She believes Harold to be Alfie, but he continuously denies it. Wendy begins blackmailing Harold, demanding her cut of the proceeds from the robbery and after realising he is not Alfie, she demands $5000 in order for her to clear his name. Harold's wife, Madge Bishop threatens the police and Wendy disappears. She later reappears and agrees to meet Harold and tells him she will speak to police to clear him as long as the blackmail attempt is not mentioned. Alfie is then arrested and Harold's name is cleared.
6 July–4 August	Damon Gaffney	Richard Morgan	While Michelle Scully is looking for some jobs during Lend a Hand Week, she posts a flyer through Damon's door. He fills it in, asking for Michelle to clean his windows. Michelle receives an envelope with her money in and a gold bracelet. Michelle decides to return the bracelet and Damon asks her to stay for a talk, but Michelle runs off. Damon and Michelle begin communicating via email and Michelle and her sister, Felicity, visit him. Damon reveals that he is a former teacher and that his wife and daughter were killed in an accident. Michelle realises that Damon is suffering from agoraphobia. When a dog attacks Michelle, Damon comes out of his house to help her. He later contacts a counsellor to get further help.
6 July–7 August	Pete Redman	Frank Raco	Pete is a postman, who Felicity Scully develops a crush on. Flick's friends, Paul McClain and Tad Reeves, play a trick on her by posting fake love letters from Pete to her. Pete mentions that he trains a girls football team and Flick signs up. Pete later explains that he did not send Flick any love letters and that somebody was playing a joke on her. Flick and Pete confront Paul and Tad. Pete then tells Flick that he is flattered by the attention. While enjoying a meal with her family at the local pub, Flick sees Pete and asks him for a meal. However, Pete's wife arrives and Flick's crush ends.
11 July–2 August	Max Crawford	Simon Gleeson	Max is Dee Bliss's ex-boyfriend, who returns to Melbourne after travelling overseas. Dee introduces Max to her boyfriend, Joel Samuels, to make it clear to Max that she has moved on. Joel becomes jealous of Max and Dee's closeness, particularity when she invites him to stay with her. Toadfish Rebecchi and Lance Wilkinson later overhear Max on the phone, explaining that he was trying to win Dee back. Joel confronts Max, who denies wanting Dee back. Max gets a new job in West Waratah and Joel sets him up on a date with Stephanie Scully. Dee later shares a kiss with Max, but lets him down gently.
24 July–24 November	Cheyenne Rivers	Angelique Meunier	Cheyenne dates Paul McClain and his friend, Felicity Scully, starts putting her down at every opportunity. Cheyenne forces Paul to choose between her and Flick and he chooses her. Cheyenne develops a hold over Paul and gets him to skip football. When he is dropped from the team, she gets her father to help out and he gets his place back. However, he decides to only play if he is picked by the coach. Cheyenne later puts some expensive football boots in Paul's bag, while they are in a shop. Paul is almost arrested and he confronts Cheyenne, ending their relationship. Cheyenne's father, Gareth later sends her away to the country.
4 August–13 June 2002	Doula Tsobanopoulos	Katherine Halliday	Tad Reeves is hired by Doula to be the new DJ at Hemisfear, a local night club. Tad later learns that Doula has been underpaying him and he threatens to report her. Tad later runs into Doula and she seems surprised to see him. Doula breaks into his house and returns his passport. Tad soon works out that Doula took his passport, so she and Richard Knott could steal his identity.
7 August	Ari Tsobanopoulos	Campbell Smith	Ari is Doula Tsobanopoulos' brother. He brings some Hemisfear T-shirts to Tad Reeves at Number 24.
15 August–11 September	Lisa Ryan	Tania Lunson	Lisa is Maurie Ryan's daughter. She is impressed when Lance Wilkinson stands up to her father who withholds payment for a landscaping job and shows an interest in him. Lance pretends to be more adventurous than he really is, but when Lisa suggests they go sky-diving, he cannot go through with it and admits the truth.
25 August	Dorothy Rivers	Marita Wilcox	Dorothy is Cheyenne Rivers' mother. She and her husband, Gareth are prominent fundraisers in the community. Dorothy emcees a slave auction to raise money for charity which Daniel Fitzgerald, Paul McClain and Drew Kirk take part in.
28 August–12 September	Gareth Rivers	Serge De Nardo	Gareth is Cheyenne Rivers' father and a member of Erinsborough High's P&C committee. He voices his concern about the book Rainbow Alley, which is on the syllabus. He begins blackmailing principal Susan Kennedy by threatening to withhold further funds if she does not cancel theatre trips to see works with suggestive themes. This backfires when Boy 4, a local musical group agree to donate $3000 to the school. When Gareth finds out about Cheyenne's shoplifting, he sends her to live with a relative in the country.
13 September	Jake Black	Andrew Lawton	A member of the music group Boy 4, who agrees to an appearance at Erinsborough High while the rest of the group rehearse. Jake meets with fans Bianca Nugent, Michelle Scully and Felicity Scully. Bianca manages to ask him some questions, but Michelle is annoyed at Jake's behaviour towards her sister. He makes it clear that he is attracted to Flick and asks her how he can take her on a date. Flick convinces him and Boy 4 to donate $3000 to the school for some computer software, before telling him she is busy all week. However, Jake persists and gives her his phone number.
29 September–25 October	Patsy Edis	Anne Maloney	Lou Carpenter hires Patsy as a nanny to his daughter Louise. Patsy moves in with Lou and she gets on well with his friends. However, Michelle Scully becomes suspicious of Patsy, when she is rude to her. Patsy tries to steal all of Lou's belongings, but Michelle's father, Joe stops her.
31 October–27 March 2001	Colin Rogers	John Tarle	Colin is a nerdy student who develops a crush on Felicity Scully. Flick brushes off his attempts to talk to her, until she stops Jess Fielding from bullying him. Colin plants a homemade bomb in a bin at the school, to impress Flick. After the bomb goes off, Jess is blamed for it. Colin learns Flick is dating Joel Samuels and he starts sending her notes telling her Joel is not good enough for her. Colin later sends Flick an anonymous note asking her to meet up. Flick is shocked to see Colin and his shrine to her. Colin tells Flick that he sent the notes and created the bomb, before stating that they are meant to be together. Joel turns up and finds Colin trying to stop Flick from leaving. Colin is later arrested.
1–24 November	Mick Scully	Andy Anderson	Mick breaks into his brother, Joe's house and announces that he has left his wife, Di, so he needs somewhere to stay. Instead of looking for a job, Mick spends his time sitting on the sofa or going to the pub. Joe offers him some work at his building site, but Mick is not interested. Joe confronts Mick about his laziness and Mick leaves. He later returns and confesses that he that like such a failure, he walked out on his family. Mick talks with Di and agrees to return home. A couple of years later, Mick and his father are involved in an accident, which requires Joe to go and help them out.
3 November–5 October 2001	Pat Miller	Matt Norman	Pat is a football coach who bullies his team. He also deals steroids and when Paul McClain learns his team mate, Nathan Tyson, is using them, he tells Karl Kennedy. Pat intimidates both Karl and Paul. Pat keeps Paul on the bench for the next games, but is eventually forced to play him when another player is injured. Paul later confronts Pat and calls him a bully, before walking off.
24 November–22 January 2001	Tina Nguyen	Kim Nguyen	A heavily pregnant Tina is travelling in Joe Scully's taxi, when she suddenly goes into labour. Joe is forced to deliver Tina's son, while a bush fire approaches them. Tina, Joe and the baby are taken to the hospital and Tina thanks Joe for his help. Tina's husband, Hung, arrives and he also thanks Joe. He later tells Joe that he and Tina have decided to call their son Joseph. Hung also asks Joe to be Joseph's godfather and he agrees.
27 November–22 January 2001	Joseph Nguyen	Joshua Ten	A heavily pregnant Tina is travelling in Joe Scully's taxi, when she suddenly goes into labour. Joe is forced to deliver Tina's son, while a bush fire approaches them. Tina, Joe and the baby are taken to the hospital and Tina thanks Joe for his help. Tina's husband, Hung, arrives and he also thanks Joe. He later tells Joe that he and Tina have decided to call their son Joseph. Hung also asks Joe to be Joseph's godfather and he agrees.
28 November	Hunq Nguyen	Ferdinand Hoang	A heavily pregnant Tina is travelling in Joe Scully's taxi, when she suddenly goes into labour. Joe is forced to deliver Tina's son, while a bush fire approaches them. Tina, Joe and the baby are taken to the hospital and Tina thanks Joe for his help. Tina's husband, Hung, arrives and he also thanks Joe. He later tells Joe that he and Tina have decided to call their son Joseph. Hung also asks Joe to be Joseph's godfather and he agrees.
5 December–12 February 2001	Clementine Truman	Melanie Lockman	Clementine is the older sister of Allana Truman. While in Lou's Place, Clementine recognises Toadfish Rebecchi from his radio show and they get chatting. A few weeks later, Clementine takes Toadie's shirt as part of a radio contest. She also encourages him to restart a radio segment, which was banned by the producers. The segment informs students about the ways they can save money and beat the system. Toadie is fired and Clementine urges him to fight for his job and sue the radio station.
6 December–13 February 2001	Kev Kelly	Frank Kennedy	Kev Kelly is a jewel thief who resides in Warrinor Prison. Libby Kennedy interviews him for the local newspaper. Kev begins threatening Larry Woodhouse into helping out with a pick-up. When Woody is on day release, he picks up some stolen jewels for Kev. However, he decides to hand them over to the police and testify against Kev. Woody is later beaten up in prison. Kev makes public threats against Woody in court, causing Woody to be placed in witness protection. Kev is later killed when he tries to rip off a drug dealer.
