= Keltie =

Keltie is a surname. Notable people with the surname include:

- Clark Keltie (born 1983), English footballer
- John Scott Keltie (1840–1927), Scottish geographer
- Kate Keltie (born 1986), Australian actress
- Rebecca Keltie, American politician

It is the given name of:

- Keltie Duggan (born 1970), Canadian swimmer
- Keltie Ferris, American abstract painter
- Keltie Hansen (born 1992), Canadian freestyle skier
- Keltie Knight, Canadian television personality, author, and producer

See also:

- Cape Keltie
- Keltie Glacier
- Keltie Head
- Kelty
