= Lori Lee =

- Neighbours character
- Portrayed by: Michelle Ang
- Duration: 2002–2004
- First appearance: 20 November 2002
- Last appearance: 20 November 2004
- Introduced by: Stanley Walsh (2002); Ric Pellizzeri (2004)
In-universe information
- Occupation: Nanny; Student
- Husband: Cameron (2012–)
- Daughters: Madeleine Lee

Lori Lee is a fictional character from the Australian soap opera Neighbours, played by Michelle Ang. She made her first screen appearance during the episode broadcast on 20 November 2002. Ang departed in 2003 but returned the following year to reprise her role. She made her last screen appearance as Lori on 20 November 2004.

== Casting ==
Neighbours' casting director, Jan Russ, was looking at New Zealand actors, when Ang went for an audition. Ang received a callback a few months later. She was nineteen when she joined the cast of Neighbours as Lori and she had to move to Melbourne for filming. Ang became one of the first Asian actors to receive a prominent role in the show.

In March 2003, reporters for the Herald Sun confirmed that Ang had decided to leave Neighbours in order to return to New Zealand to complete a science and commerce degree. Ang had already completed two years of the degree, but when she transferred to Monash University, they took too long to recognise her previous credits and she did not want to lose them. Ang admitted that quitting had been an "incredibly difficult" decision as the cast and crew had become a family to her. She stated "I decided that even though I love Neighbours to pieces, I needed to finish off my degree." Ang filmed her last scenes on 11 March and said it was "really emotional".

In April 2004, she returned to reprise her role as Lori. Of her return she said, "It felt a bit strange at first, but it is really like stepping into a pair of old shoes. [..] I quickly settled back in and it's easier when you're working with your old castmates because they help you out as well."

== Development ==
Lori becomes good friends with Connor O'Neill (Patrick Harvey) and they later have a one-night stand. Harvey believed that it was a "rebound thing" because there was no attraction between them. Connor was missing his girlfriend, Michelle (Kate Keltie), while Lori was heartbroken over Jack Scully (Jay Bunyan). Lori became Connor's "shoulder to cry on" and it felt right for them both at the time, but the next morning they regret it. Harvey called the situation awkward, stating "Connor thinks that Lori might want a relationship, and Lori thinks the same of him, even though that's not the case." Lori later discovered she was pregnant with Connor's child and initially thought about having an abortion, before deciding to keep the baby and leave Erinsborough. Ang revealed "Back then she didn't tell anyone what she was going to do about her pregnancy except for Jack."

A year later, Connor, who has since reunited with Michelle, runs into Lori and is introduced to his daughter, Madeleine (Madison Lu). TV Week's Jackie Brygel explained that Lori's timing could not be worse, as Connor and Michelle are spending a night at Lassiter's Hotel and Connor has been dared to wear some make-up. Of the situation, Harvey told Bygel "Connor is standing there looking like an idiot. Lori says 'Here's your daughter!' He just can't believe it. Everything feels like it's crashing down around him. It's a massive shock." Ang stated that while Lori was planning on introducing Connor to Maddy, she was caught off guard in the lobby and the situation was not ideal for either of them. Ang stated "Lori didn't even know that Connor and Michelle had got back together. I'm not sure she would have brought Maddy into Connor's life if she'd known this." Ang explained that Lori had been keen to make things right and make sure her daughter knows her father. She wanted to give Connor the chance to be a father. The actress added that working with Madison, the baby who portrayed Maddy, was "quite challenging" and that she had learnt a lot.

== Storylines ==
Lori first arrives in Ramsay Street at the home of her boyfriend, Jack's parents. Within her first few hours at Number 26, she manages to offend Jack's mother, Lyn, with her straight talking and buying a coconut cake, even with the knowledge that Lyn does not like Coconut and causes further grief when she lets it slip that Jack has given up on soccer after being dropped from his team in England and plans to work for her father in New Zealand.

Lori and Jack eventually sort things out and decide to repeat Year 12 when the school year commences (partly due to work options being limited and the fact neither of them had completed their schooling prior to living in London). The couple go on Schoolies with Jack's sister, Michelle, her boyfriend Connor O'Neill (who Jack knew while in London), Nina Tucker (Delta Goodrem) and Taj Coppin (Jaime Robbie Reyne). Lori notices Jack is distant with her but he assures her that he is committed to her, despite obviously being attracted to Nina.

When Harold Bishop (Ian Smith) writes a play to be performed at the Community Centre, Lori leaps into the project and modernizes it with a space theme in mind with Jack and Nina as the leads, and writes steamy kissing scenes for them, unaware of their apparent attraction. Lori makes an immediate enemy of new principal Candace Barkham (Kate Whitbread), on her first day of Year 12 at Erinsborough High by wearing trousers instead of the regulation school dress for girls. To get back at Barkham, Lori uses an embarrassing photo of Barkham adjusting her underwear, taken by Taj and puts copies all over the school.

As the performance of Mission Erinsborough nears, Lori notices Jack being distant and witnesses an exchange between him and Nina but dismisses it as rehearsing. On the evening of the play, Lori cannot hide her jealousy when Nina and Jack share their big kiss. After Nina dumps Taj without explanation, Lori becomes a friend to him and they begin hanging around together. One day, while messing around at a local pool, Lori slips and falls injuring her back. When Lori wakes up in hospital and cannot feel her legs, Karl Kennedy (Alan Fletcher) informs her that there is no guarantee that she will ever walk again. Lori is later discharged from hospital and returns to the Scullys.

When Lori challenges Jack on his moods, he confesses that he has been seeing Nina behind Lori and Taj's backs. Taj walks in at that moment and Jack tries to explain, resulting in a fight on the lawn between the boys. Lori finishes with Jack and feels she cannot stay any longer in the house and move in next door with Karl and his wife, Susan.

One day during a massage session with Nurse Dee Bliss (Madeleine West), Lori regains some feeling in her toes and gradually begins to walk again, which is witnessed by Taj. When Taj kisses Lori on the cheek one day, she fears that he may want something more but is relieved when he admits he likes her as a friend. Lori, now back on her feet, enlists the help of Connor to print T-shirts to make some money, even offering to make an advertisement for the Coffee shop featuring Harold in the guise of "Afro Harold". After Michelle leaves for New York, Lori and Connor begin spending time together and sleep together one night, which both regret.

Lori later discovers she is pregnant and Connor is against the idea of being a father and Lori decides to have an abortion. On the day of the scheduled abortion, Connor has a change of heart and tries to talk Lori out of it but she is adamant. However, upon entering the clinic, Lori realises she cannot go through with it and flees in a cab without Connor. Lori asks Jack, of all people to help her pack. Lori leaves two letters; one for the Kennedys thanking them for letting her stay and one for Connor, telling him not to contact her. Lori then leaves for the airport to return to New Zealand.

After giving birth a daughter, Madeleine Lee (Madison Lu), Lori returns to Erinsborough the following year to introduce Madeleine to her father. Lori and Maddy arrive at Lassiter's hotel just as Connor and the recently returned Michelle are leaving. Connor is reluctant to accept his new role as a father after having just rekindled his relationship with Michelle, but eventually grows to bond with Maddy. Jack tries to win Lori back and Lori is tempted but Lyn talks her out of it as she fears she may be hurt again. Lori is offered a job by Gino Esposito (Shane McNamara) in his new salon in Lorne and takes it. To test Jack's loyalty, she tells him a lie that Gino needs new male models to go to Europe which he jumps at the chance to do so, confirming Lyn's suspicions. Lori and Maddie then leave for Lorne.

On Lori's next return, she is with a new partner, Nick Sullivan (Angus Grant), who is very rude to Connor and tries to keep him out of Maddy's life. Lori apologises for Nick's behaviour and reveals that she, Maddy and Nick are moving to Adelaide. One day, Connor snatches Maddy from her pram at Lassiter's when Nick leaves her unattended. Nick is furious but Lori is understanding towards Connor as she realises that Nick is selfish and she feels it is Maddy's best interest to have regular contact with her father and then promptly tells Nick she and Maddy will not be going with him to Adelaide and dumps him. Lori returns to Lorne and lets Connor keep in touch with Maddy as often as he wants. In 2012, Connor reveals that Lori is marrying a man called Cameron. He attends the wedding and decides to move closer to Lori, so he can spend more time with Maddie.

== Reception ==
For her portrayal of Lori, Ang was nominated for the Logie Award for Most Popular New Talent in 2003. A writer for the BBC's Neighbours website said Lori's most notable moment was "Winding up in a wheel chair after an accident at the pool." The Advertiser's Jessica Hurt branded Lori "good-hearted", and said her "freak accident" would lead to "the start of some bizarre and potentially controversial storylines for the soap." Cameron Adams of the Herald Sun was pleased when Lori returned, writing "It's good to have feisty Lori (Michelle Ang) back in Ramsay St, opening up a can of worms in her relationship with Jack (Jay Bunyan) and Connor (Patrick Harvey), the father of her baby."
