= Michelle Scully =

Fictional character from the Australian soap opera Neighbours

- Neighbours character
- Portrayed by: Kate Keltie
- Duration: 1999–2004, 2023
- First appearance: 20 October 1999
- Last appearance: 4 December 2023
- Introduced by: Stanley Walsh (1999); Ric Pellizerri (2004); Jason Herbison (2023)
- Book appearances: Sisters in the City
In-universe information
- Occupation: Student at Erinsborough High (1999–2003)
- Father: Joe Scully
- Mother: Lyn Scully
- Brothers: Jack Scully; Oscar Scully
- Sisters: Stephanie Scully; Felicity Scully
- Sons: Joe
- Grandfathers: Pat Scully; Charlie Cassidy
- Grandmothers: Valda Sheergold
- Uncles: Mick Scully; Tom Scully; Michael Cassidy
- Nephews: Charlie Hoyland; Adam Fitzgerald

Michelle Elizabeth Scully is a fictional character from the Australian soap opera Neighbours, played by Kate Keltie. She made her first screen appearance during the episode broadcast on 20 October 1999 when she and her family moved into Ramsay Street. Michelle departed in 2003, but made a brief return in 2004, before departing again on 21 April 2004. Keltie reprised the role in a guest appearance on 4 December 2023.

== Creation and casting ==
In October 1999, the Scully family, consisting of parents Lyn (Janet Andrewartha) and Joe (Shane Connor) and siblings Stephanie (Carla Bonner), Felicity (Holly Valance) and Michelle were introduced to Neighbours. They were the first new family to move into Ramsay Street since Ruth Wilkinson (Ailsa Piper) and her children arrived in 1996. The actors began filming their first scenes twelve weeks prior to their on screen debuts. Kate Keltie was thirteen when she was cast as youngest daughter, Michelle. Michelle was said to be twelve years old and "occasionally petulant but always lovable."

In November 2002, it was announced that Keltie was to leave Neighbours at the end of the year to go back to school. A reporter for the Herald Sun also said Keltie quit the soap to focus on her Showbiz and Entertainment Expo business, following the success of the first expo held in November. Keltie's decision to leave the show came close to the departure of Valance, who played her on-screen sister. Keltie originally intended to leave in August, but later agreed to stay on until the end of year because of Valance's exit. Of her departure, she said "I'd like to move on and do other things because Neighbours has been such a big part of my life for the past three years. I definitely don't want to be typecast. A lot of people do stay because of the security of it, but I want to find other work." Her exit scenes aired on 14 May 2003. In August 2003, Kylie Miller of The Age confirmed Keltie would be reprising her role for six weeks in October, with a view to a full-time return. Miller also reported that Ketlie would be returning around the same time as Michelle Ang, who plays her on-screen love rival Lori Lee.

== Development ==
Speaking to Alison James of Soaplife, Keltie called Michelle a spoilt little princess, who can twist her parents round her finger. The actress said Michelle looks like butter would not melt, but this is far from the truth. Describing her character further, Keltie said "She's actually wild and thinks she can get away with anything. She also has a mad imagination which means she tells very convincing fibs." The BBC's profile for Michelle said she was "very mature, very clever, and very determined." She felt heavily burdened being the youngest member of the Scully family and hated it when Stephanie and Felicity fought, as she is "a sensitive soul." Michelle is the apple of her father's eye, which makes her the one who can hurt him most. The BBC added Michelle has "a definite desire to see the world - not that cold feet don't affect her sometimes - and a definite desire to change the world."

Shortly after her arrival, Michelle meets Paul McClain (Jansen Spencer) and develops a crush on him. Paul fancies Felicity and thinks Michelle is annoying. Michelle does not let that put her off and she tries blackmailing him into taking her out. She also develops a sudden interest in music, which is one of Paul's hobbies.

In 2023, Keltie reprised her role as Michelle. The return was part of an ongoing storyline which resulted in a protest and riot against the closing of Erinsborough High, which leads to Michelle and other former students joining. Keltie described her return as "so much fun and it's been really amazing to catch up with lots of old friends". She called it a "pretty different experience" acting as Michelle as the character had previously been in high school during her initial stint. She also told social media that Michelle was living with Felicity in New York, had gotten married and had given birth to a son named Joe. She also revealed that Michelle's father, Joe, had died off-screen.

== Storylines ==
Michelle moves to Erinsborough with her family. She complains that she is unwell in order to get out of moving boxes and furniture. Michelle takes a shine to neighbour Paul McClain, who is interested in her older sister Felicity. When food goes missing from the Scully house, Michelle's father, Joe, discovers she is hoarding for the Y2K bug. Joe assures her that he will not let any harm come to the family. On Millennium Eve, Michelle babysits five-year-old Louise Carpenter (Jiordan Anna Tolli), but grows impatient that she is missing the celebrations out in the street and briefly leaves Louise unattended. Louise, unable to find Michelle, discovers some firecrackers and matches on the table and starts a fire in the Scully house. Drew Kirk (Dan Paris) notices the house is on fire and rescues Louise. Michelle regrets leaving Louise alone.

When Michelle begins Year 8 at Erinsborough High, she is bullied by Cecile Bliss (Molly McCaffrey) and her friends. Michelle talks about it to Joe and he tells her to stand up for herself, but this backfires when Michelle pushes Cecile one day, causing her to fall and break her arm, resulting in suspension for Michelle. Soon after this, Michelle begins a friendship with Bianca Nugent (Jane Harber). After spotting a seemingly abandoned house, Michelle investigates and agrees to help the mystery occupant. When Michelle tries to find out who it is, she is immediately spooked when Damon Gaffney (Richard Morgan) confronts her. Upon learning that Damon became a recluse after his wife and daughter died, Michelle tries her best to help him but is accused of meddling. When Michelle is scared by a dog, Damon comes to her aid. Damon then decides to receive counselling for his agoraphobia.

When Patsy Edis (Anne Maloney) begins babysitting for Lou, Michelle is immediately suspicious and warns him about her, but he is dismissive. Michelle's suspicions are proved correct, after Patsy is caught burgling Lou's and several other houses in the street. Michelle takes an interest in the environment and other green issues. This leads to an incident where Michelle and several others are arrested during an animal rights protest march. Michelle starts dating Zack Shaw (Owen Lee). When Zack transfers to Erinsborough High, he is not keen to be seen around Michelle as he is several years older than she is. The couple later split up when Zack spreads rumours about Michelle being easy. She takes revenge by breaking into the school with Elly Conway (Kendell Nunn) and writing "Zack is gay" on the blackboard, disgusting Elly, who believes Michelle is not much better for stooping to Zack's level.

When Connor O'Neill (Patrick Harvey), a friend of Michelle's brother Jack (Jay Bunyan) moves in with the Scullys there is an obvious attraction between the two. Michelle's parents become concerned about the age gap. After Michelle is hospitalised following a mishap with floor cleaner, while making mocktails, Connor is forced to admit he is illiterate. Michelle agrees to help him, but Connor decides against it and gets help from Libby Kennedy (Kym Valentine) instead. Michelle becomes concerned when Connor begins spending a lot of time hanging around with Nina Tucker (Delta Goodrem). Connor tells Michelle there is nothing going on, but Nina clearly is attracted to Connor. When she is blackmailed by Tahnee Coppin (Anna Jennings-Edquist), Michelle and Nina take revenge on her when she tries to claim credit for Nina's song "Born to Try".

Michelle receives news that she is accepted into the exchange programme, but on the day she is supposed to leave for New York, the insurance falls through. Sometime later, Michelle and Connor's relationship is put to the test when Jim Baynes (David Cormick), one of Joe's workmates calls immigration on Connor. After trying to flee, immigration agree to be lenient with Connor, citing his illiteracy. Joe throws Connor out of the house and he moves into Number 30. Michelle later gets a second chance with the exchange programme after Tahnee is expelled from it and leaves for New York after an emotional farewell with Connor. Joe visits Michelle soon after.

A year later, Michelle returns to Erinsborough and finds Connor in the arms of Carmella Cammenitti (Natalie Blair). Connor breaks up with Carmella, which results in her slapping Michelle. After an initially shaky reunion and the revelation of Connor's one night stand with Jack's ex-girlfriend Lori Lee (Michelle Ang), Michelle decides that she is going to leave New York and resume her life in Erinsborough with Connor. After the couple spend the night together at Lassiter's, they get a shock in the hotel lobby when they see Lori and she is holding her and Connor's daughter Madeleine (Madison Lu). Connor pledges his loyalty to Michelle, but when Lori reveals Connor practically offered to marry her the previous year if she did not go through with the abortion, Michelle breaks up with Connor. She says goodbye to her family and returns to the States.

Michelle returns twenty years later to protest against the closure of Erinsborough High. It is revealed she has since married a famous chef. After Toadie Rebecchi (Ryan Moloney) spots her from a distance, Michelle is interviewed by Summer Hoyland (Jordy Lucas), her eldest sister Steph's former stepdaughter. She talks about her experiences of being bullied by Cecile and praises Susan for helping her.

== Other appearances ==
In 2005, four novellas based on characters from Neighbours were released. The books were available to buy at some Australia Post outlets and on the internet. Michelle and her sister, Felicity were the focus of one of the books entitled Sisters in the City. It explains what happened after they both left Erinsborough and went to New York together. Of the books, a spokeswoman said "It's different to what happens in the show; it's more like a fantasy of what happens, might have happened, in the show, they would take about an hour to read if you're a quick reader".

== Reception ==
Jackie Brygel from the Herald Sun said the character was "never meek nor mild". A writer for the BBC's Neighbours website said Michelle's most notable moment was "Keeping her relationship with Connor a secret." Jim Schembri of The Age paid tribute to Michelle and praised her departure, saying "Our beloved Michelle Scully (Kate Keltie) is off to New York to continue her education. There's been a party, a final I-still-love-you scene with former flame Connor (Patrick Harvey) and the inevitable don't-cry-mum moment. It's beautiful, touching and all done with the type of small-screen melodramatic pathos that the makers of Neighbours now do so well and so effortlessly that one wonders if they've developed some special software to write it (and I say that with love, guys, so please don't sue)." Katie Baillie writing for Metro included Michelle on a list of the "worst Neighbours characters" ever. Baillie claimed that Michelle was a "weirdo" for casting spells on Paul and was "annoyingly self-righteous" and later "went all spoilt brat".
