= Perry Bay =

Bay in Antarctica

Location of Perry Bay in Antarctica

Perry Bay (66°8′S 132°49′E) is an open ice-filled bay about 12 nautical miles (22 km) wide, indenting the coast between Freeman Point and a stubby peninsula terminating in Cape Keltie. Delineated from air photos taken by U.S. Navy Operation Highjump (1946–47). Named by Advisory Committee on Antarctic Names (US-ACAN) for Lieutenant O.H. Perry on the sloop Peacock of the United States Exploring Expedition (1838–42) under Wilkes.
