= Felicity Scully =

Fictional character

- Neighbours character
- Portrayed by: Holly Valance
- Duration: 1999–2002, 2005, 2022
- First appearance: 20 October 1999
- Last appearance: 28 July 2022
- Introduced by: Stanley Walsh (1999); Ric Pellizzeri (2005); Jason Herbison (2022)
- Book appearances: Sisters in the City
In-universe information
- Occupation: Student; Waitress; Salesperson; Salon assistant; Lassiter's Hotel staff
- Father: Joe Scully
- Mother: Lyn Scully
- Brothers: Jack Scully; Oscar Scully
- Sisters: Stephanie Scully; Michelle Scully
- Grandfathers: Pat Scully; Charlie Cassidy
- Grandmothers: Valda Sheergold
- Uncles: Mick Scully; Tom Scully; Michael Cassidy

Felicity "Flick" Scully is a fictional character from the Australian soap opera Neighbours, played by Holly Valance. She made her first screen appearance during the episode broadcast on 20 October 1999. She departed on 28 November 2002, but made cameo appearances in the serial's 20th anniversary episode in 2005 as well as the final episode in 2022.

== Creation and casting ==
The character was created along with her family, which initially included father Joe (Shane Connor), mother Lyn (Janet Andrewartha), eldest sister Stephanie (Carla Bonner), and youngest sister Michelle (Kate Keltie). The Scullys were introduced during the episode broadcast on 20 October 1999, following the departure of the Martin family.

Former Neighbours cast member Scott Michaelson saw a picture of Holly Valance in a magazine and got in touch to ask her if she would like to audition for Neighbours. Having previously acted in commercials, Valance did not have much auditioning experience, but she thought she would give it "a shot" and went up for the role. She learned that she had won the part of Felicity three months later. Valance was surprised that she had been cast, saying "I never would have [believed it]. You know the show that I've been watching since I was two years old and been such a huge fan. Not in a million years would I thought I would be a part of." Neighbours marked Valance's first major television role. She was fifteen when she auditioned, and sixteen when she was cast as Felicity, one year older than her character was said to be.

== Development ==
=== Characterisation ===
Upon her introduction, Felicity, or Flick, was fifteen years old and "a devoted feminist", who had a "very active social conscience." Jim Schembri from The Age thought Flick was "the slightly more reserved" sibling, who he noted were all different from another. Valance said she shared some similarities with her characters, including her stubborn streak and her "feistiness." She also thought Flick acted a lot younger than her age. When it came to Flick and romance, Valance said "She throws her heart and soul into everything, every guy she meets she's in love with fully and completely and will marry him if he asked her after the first hour of knowing him. Whereas I'm like sit back and really think about things and more practical and it takes a long time to make a decision even if it's which socks to buy."

=== Departure ===
Valance departed Neighbours in 2002 to concentrate on her music career. She filmed her final scenes in August of that year. Valance said it took three takes to film her last scene. Of her departure, she said "I've learnt so much. I kept telling myself I wasn't going to cry, it's so sad to be leaving. I've made such good friends and learnt so much. When I started, I didn't know a thing."

=== Returns and character reflection ===
In March 2005, it was announced that Valance would be reprising her role as Felicity for the show's 20th anniversary episode, "Friends for Twenty Years". In July 2022, she returned with a special appearance for the final episode of the soap opera. Upon hearing that the serial would be concluding, Valance and her friend, Natalie Imbruglia (who played Beth Brennan), brainstormed a way to become part of the finale and approached producers with an idea for a scene, which was filmed in London. Valance expressed her sadness over the serial's ending and when asked about her favourite memories of being on Neighbours, she explained, "It becomes such a huge part of your life. You see those people more than your own family because you have long days. You know, I still talk to most cast members and some of the crew every few days really, so they become your second family." Additionally, Valance explained that she enjoyed spending time with the cast in the green room, calling it "the most fun". She summarised of being on the show, "It was so much fun. I look back at it so fondly and I'm really grateful I got that time and although it's sad the show is ending, everything sort of changes eventually, but I look back at it and it's very precious to me."

== Storylines ==
Felicity and her family move into Number 26 Ramsay Street minutes after the Martin family move out. Flick catches the attention of Paul McClain (Jansen Spencer), who lives next door, but ultimately pursues Billy Kennedy (Jesse Spencer), who lives at Number 28. Felicity gives up once she finds out Billy has unresolved issues in his on-off relationship with Anne Wilkinson (Brooke Satchwell). When Paul tries to kiss Felicity, she is unimpressed. Soon after settling into the area, Felicity later sees older boy Sean Edwards (Daniel Collopy) much to her father Joe's chagrin. Felicity and Sean begin sneaking around one day and when Sean is forced to hide and tries escape, Joe catches him and throws him out of the house. Later, when Sean's friends accompany them on a trip down the coast, Sean suggests that they sleep together. Felicity then realises Sean is not the one for her.

Felicity then develops a crush on the local postman, Pete Redman (Frank Raco). Paul and his friend Tad Reeves (Jonathon Dutton) soon play a practical joke by sending fake replies to love letters Felicity had left for Pete. Felicity soon uncovers this and is angry with her friends, but that subsides when Pete asks her to try out for his soccer team. Felicity arrives overdressed for the first session, but continues. Flick later asks Pete to join her and her family for a meal, but she discovers Pete is married.

When Erinsborough High's debutante ball arrives, Joel Samuels (Daniel MacPherson) agrees to be Felicity's date. The couple, opposed by Joe continue sneaking around. Joe manages to catch them one day and has a heated confrontation which results in him shoving and injuring Joel. This leads to Felicity moving out of home and in with Joel, driving a wedge between her and her parents. After Joel leaves for London to attend his friend Malcolm Kennedy's (Benjamin McNair) wedding to Catherine O'Brien (Radha Mitchell), Felicity stays on at Number 30 and manages to irritate Joel's housemates Toadfish Rebecchi (Ryan Moloney) and Dee Bliss (Madeleine West) with her lack of domestic skills and generally being irresponsible and untidy. On Felicity's 18th birthday, she receives news that Joel has decided to end their relationship.

While on a school trip, Tad is bitten by a scorpion and, convinced he is going to die, admits to Felicity that he has always had a crush on her. When Tad recovers, he and Felicity begin dating, but it ultimately goes nowhere. When Felicity is trapped in the pub cellar overnight with barman Matt Hancock (Stephen Hunt), she accuses him of having engineered the situation and they argue. Matt later admits that he has had a crush on Felicity since he moved into Ramsay Street and she begins playing Priscilla Presley at his Elvis impersonation gigs. The two decide to be friends and put the whole thing behind them.

Felicity decides to work rather than start University and gets a job at Lassiter's Hotel. While working there, she meets Marc Lambert (David Karakai) and is instantly attracted to him. When Steph introduces her new boyfriend to the family, Felicity is shocked to see it is Marc. Despite this, Felicity and Marc flirt and begin secretly seeing each other. Steph and Marc get engaged and on the day of the wedding, Marc hesitates and tells Steph he cannot go through it. He looks over at Felicity, which gives their affair away. After the wedding party returns to the street, Steph and Felicity have a huge argument about the events that have transpired, resulting in Felicity fleeing Erinborough in the taxi Valda Sheergold (Joan Sydney) arrived in.

Stuart Parker (Blair McDonough) tracks Felicity down in Sydney and tries to persuade her to return. Marc also arrives in Sydney and tries to win her back, but she realises that he plans to take her on what would have been his and Steph's honeymoon. Felicity returns to Erinsborough and sees that things are still strained and leaves for several months to join Tad in America. Shortly after Felicity returns, she and Stuart begin a relationship. Felicity gets a job with the Lassiter's New York branch and Stuart proposes to her with his grandmother's ring and Felicity accepts. On the day of her departure, Felicity notices she is missing her ring and Stuart has to make a dash from the airport back to Ramsay Street to find it. With literally seconds remaining, Stuart makes it back to give the ring to Felicity. Several months later, Michelle flies out to join her and Stuart calls off the engagement.

Felicity makes a brief appearance in Annalise Hartman's (Kimberley Davies) documentary where she is revealed to be living in Hollywood and discusses her experiences of living in Ramsay Street. She mentions that she meant to post the ring back to Stuart, but had to sell it due to bills. She then congratulates him on his new engagement to Sindi Watts (Marisa Warrington). Seventeen years later, Felicity overhears Beth Brennan viewing a video of Karl Kennedy (Alan Fletcher) and Felicity tells Beth she used to live on Ramsay Street. Beth tells her she did too and the two send in a video to congratulate Toadie Rebecchi (Ryan Moloney) and Melanie Pearson (Lucinda Cowden) on their wedding.

== Other appearances ==
In 2005, four novellas based on characters from Neighbours were released. The books were available to buy at some Australia Post outlets and on the internet. Felicity and her sister, Michelle were the focus of one of the books entitled Sisters in the City. It explains what happened after they both left Erinsborough and went to New York together. Of the books, a spokeswoman said "It's different to what happens in the show; it's more like a fantasy of what happens, might have happened, in the show, they would take about an hour to read if you're a quick reader".

== Reception ==
For her portrayal of Felicity, Valance was nominated for the Logie Award for Most Popular New Female Talent in 2000. In a feature on past Neighbours characters, telecommunications network Orange described Felicity's most memorable moment as "Falling in love with her sister Steph's fiancé, Marc Lambert. The feeling was entirely mutual, and when Marc got to the altar with Steph, he was so busy ogling Flick he couldn't say his vows." Michael Osborn of the BBC said "As Flick Scully in Neighbours, Valance spent far too much time flouncing around in that terrible school uniform with a butter-wouldn't-melt look in her eyes."

Wil Marlow The Birmingham Post stated that Flick "immediately stood out as the one to watch". In June 2002, Felicity came second in a poll run by Newsround to find viewer's favourite Neighbours character. She received 22.55% of the vote. In the same year, Young Media Australia criticised Neighbours in a report, singling out Felicity falling in love with her sisters fiancé. They suggested that the scriptwriters should take more responsibility when influencing young viewers. A TVNZ reporter included Flick in their list of the top 30 Neighbours' characters, and stated "While the other teenage girls were chasing boys, Flick was more interested in saving the world. She was full of ideals, not just a pretty face." In 2022, Kate Randall from Heat included Flick in the magazine's top ten Neighbours characters of all time feature. Randall opined that Valance "flounced onto our screens as part of the loud Scully family." Lorna White from Yours profiled the magazine's "favourite Neighbours characters of all time", on which Flick was listed. Hiyah Zaidi from NationalWorld that Flick became known for finding "herself in a number of love triangles."
