= Freeman Glacier =

Glacier in Antarctica

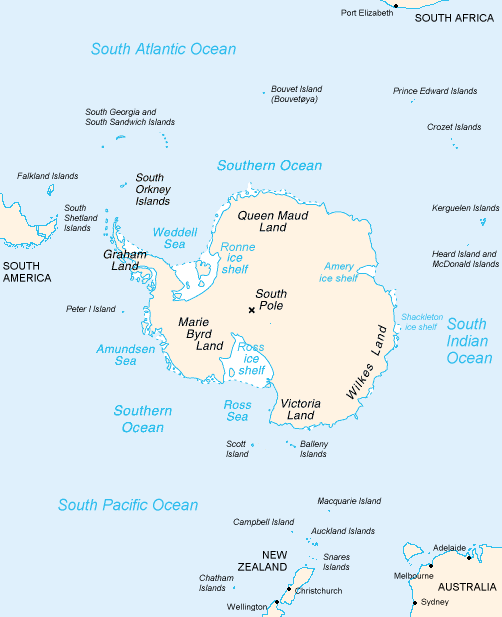
- Map of Antarctica, with Wilkes Land slightly to the right

- Location within Antarctica
- Type: channel
- Location: Wilkes Land
- Coordinates: 66°10′00″S 132°24′00″E
- Thickness: unknown
- Terminus: Perry Bay
- Status: unknown

Freeman Glacier (66°10′S 132°24′E) is a channel glacier flowing to the west side of Perry Bay, Antarctica, immediately east of Freeman Point. It was delineated from air photos taken by U.S. Navy Operation Highjump (1946–47), and was named by the Advisory Committee on Antarctic Names for J.D. Freeman, sailmaker on the sloop Peacock of the United States Exploring Expedition (1838–42) under Charles Wilkes.

== See also ==
- List of glaciers in the Antarctic
- Glaciology
