= Freeman Point =

Point in Wilkes Land, Antarctica

Freeman Point (66°9′S 132°6′E) is an ice-covered point on the coast of Antarctica, close west of Freeman Glacier. It was delineated from air photos taken by U.S. Navy Operation Highjump (1946–47), and named by the Advisory Committee on Antarctic Names for J.D. Freeman of the United States Exploring Expedition (1838–42) under Lieutenant Charles Wilkes.
