= Jaime Robbie Reyne =

Australian singer/songwriter and actor

- Born: Jaime Robbie Ellmer Reyne; Fitzroy, Victoria, Australia
- Other name: J.R. Reyne
- Occupations: Actor; singer-songwriter
- Years active: 2001–present
- Children: 1
- Relatives: James Reyne (father); David Reyne (uncle)
- Musical career
- Genres: Rock; folk; roots; Americana; alternative; country
- Instruments: Vocals; guitar; harmonica; mandolin
- Labels: Green Media/MGM; Mercury/Universal; Fur
- Formerly of: Rushcutter

Jaime Robbie Reyne is an Australian singer-songwriter and actor.

== Personal life ==
Reyne's parents are the rock singer James Reyne and English-born model/stylist Kim Ellmer. His uncle is actor David Reyne. Reyne was raised by his mother and had little contact with his father, however, he was close to his uncle and paternal grandmother. He was educated in Melbourne, Australia at Scotch College.

Reyne was engaged to Dutch model Louise Van Der Vorst until 2017. They have a son, born in 2016.

== Music career ==
Between 2003 and 2004, Reyne played solo gigs in London and festivals in Australia. 2005 saw the independent release of his debut solo acoustic EP Tex Sessions. In 2006, he formed Jaime Robbie Reyne & The Paradise Three. In 2007, the band released their debut mini-Album, Fallen Flower, (through Green Media/MGM Distribution) to critical acclaim, from many publications including Rolling Stone (Australia). The release was followed up with a national tour and performances at festivals including St Kilda Festival, Queenscliff Music Festival, Sovereign Hill Music Festival and The Australian Country Music Muster.

Reyne then formed the group, Rushcutter with Vincent Daniele (guitar), Tim Wheatley (bass) and Brett Wolfenden (drums) in 2008. Wheatley is the son of Glenn Wheatley, and manages the band. They soon started writing and producing demos and playing headline shows in Melbourne, before disembarking to the United States. Upon returning to Australia in early 2009, Rushcutter were signed to Mercury Records/Universal working with American producer Niko Bolas on their debut release, Call High Water at Melbourne's Sing Sing Studios. The four track EP was released in 2009, with the title track becoming The Australian's song of the week. The next and final release for Rushcutter was 2010's "Foreign Soil" - ("a classic rock sound, with a contemporary pop-rock twist" The Music Network).

After touring Australia, Rushcutter split due to "creative differences" and Reyne returned to his solo career, touring Australia with Pat Benatar and The Bangles, as well as playing shows with Cloud Control, Thirsty Merc and Richard Clapton. Reyne moved to New York City in July 2011 as he pursued his solo career. He released his debut solo single "Remember To Breathe" that same year. The track was described as "a fine slice of rollicking pop" by Jeff Jenkins of Inpress. Reyne toured "Remember To Breathe" throughout Australia and the US.

== Acting career ==
Reyne's first major acting role was Taj Coppin in the soap opera Neighbours. He made his first appearance in November 2002. He also has appeared in Horace and Tina and Winners & Losers. His theatre and film productions include Diablo is Done For, Evolution, Snow White, and G7.

In 2016, Reyne played Dan Delaney in the television series The Secret Daughter alongside Jessica Mauboy.

In 2021, Reyne joined the cast of Home and Away in the recurring role of photographer Emmett Ellison. Reyne accepted the role after his plans to go on tour with his band were cancelled due to the COVID-19 pandemic.

== Filmography ==
Year	Title	Role	Notes
2001	Horace and Tina	Rory	Episode: "Dancing Partners"
2002–2004	Neighbours	Taj Coppin	Main cast
2016	Winners & Losers	Darcy Fuller	Episode: "Cold Hard Bitch"
2016–2017	The Secret Daughter	Dan Delaney	Recurring role
2021–2022	Home and Away	Emmett Ellison	Recurring role

== Discography ==
Singles:

- "To Be Your Friend" – Green Media/MGM Distribution (JRRP301) (23 June 2006)
- "The Blonde Hotel" – Green Media/MGM Distribution (JRRP301) (2 March 2007)
- "Fallen Flower" – Green Media/MGM Distribution (JRRP301) (March 2007)
- "Call High Water" – Mercury/Universal (5 September 2009)
- "Remember To Breathe" – Fur Records/Valleyarm (9 May 2011)
- "Turtledove" – Valleyarm (14 November 2011)
- "Word Gets Around" – Valleyarm (13 July 2012)
- "Montgomery" – Valleyarm (21 January 2013)

EPs:

- Call High Water – Mercury/Universal (2707065) (10 September 2009)
- Foreign Soil – Mercury/Universal (1 March 2010)
- Surrounded by the City – Valleyarm (6 April 2013)

LPs:

- Tex Sessions - Independent (2005)
- Fallen Flower – Green Media/MGM Distribution (JRRP301) (March 2007)

Compilations:

- Discoveries – X Games
- Beer Blokes & BBQS, Vol. 3 - Mercury/Universal
- Painted Black: 50 Years of The Rolling Stones - Halcyon Records

=== See also ===
- The Secret Daughter: Songs from the Original TV Series (2016)
