= Kyal Marsh =

Australian former actor and model (born 1987)

- Born: Kyal Reese Marsh; 16 August 1987 (age 38); Clare, South Australia
- Occupations: Actor; model; gymnast
- Years active: 1988–2007

Kyal Reese Marsh (born 16 August 1987) is an Australian former actor and model. He was born in Clare, South Australia. He moved to Melbourne with his family when he was one year old. He is now a managing director in the building industry at Fitzroy Shopfitting & Building in Melbourne.

== Acting & modelling career ==
Marsh appeared in the television soap opera Neighbours, where he played the regular character Boyd Hoyland, who first featured on the show in June 2002. Before that he worked as a child model, but Neighbours was his first credited acting role. He attended a private school called Wesley College in Melbourne, but dropped out at 15. In April 2005, TV Hits magazine published an interview in which he said that he planned to carry on being in Neighbours for at least three more years. However it became known in early 2007 that his contract will not be renewed and that he finished filming in April 2007. His character left the show for the last time in August 2007. Marsh quit acting after Neighbours.

== Gymnastics & "Cirque De Celebrite" ==
That summer Marsh moved to the United Kingdom, and in September 2007 he was announced as a cast member for the next series of the Sky One reality show Cirque de Celebrite, which is filmed on Woolwich Common in South East London. Marsh won the series final on 9 December 2007. According to his contestant biography for the show, Marsh's love of extreme sports fuelled his willingness to participate in the competition, including his ability in gymnastics, which he took briefly when he was younger.

== Family ==
Marsh's younger sister Cobé Marsh was a contestant on Australia's Next Top Model, Cycle 3. She is now attempting to become a recording artist.
