= Cape Keltie =

Headland in Antarctica

Cape Keltie (66°3′S 133°26′E) is an ice-covered cape on the Clarie Coast of Antarctica, 11 nautical miles (20 km) west of Cape Cesney. It was discovered from the Aurora by the Australasian Antarctic Expedition (1911–14) under Douglas Mawson, and roughly charted at a distance of about 10 nautical miles (19 km) as lying in 66°5′S 133°0′E. It was named by Mawson for John Scott Keltie, Secretary of the Royal Geographical Society, 1892–1915. The identification of this feature is based upon the Gardner Dean Blodgett map of 1955, compiled from aerial photos taken by U.S. Navy Operation Highjump (1946–47).
