= Michelle Ang =

New Zealand actress, director and producer (born 1983)

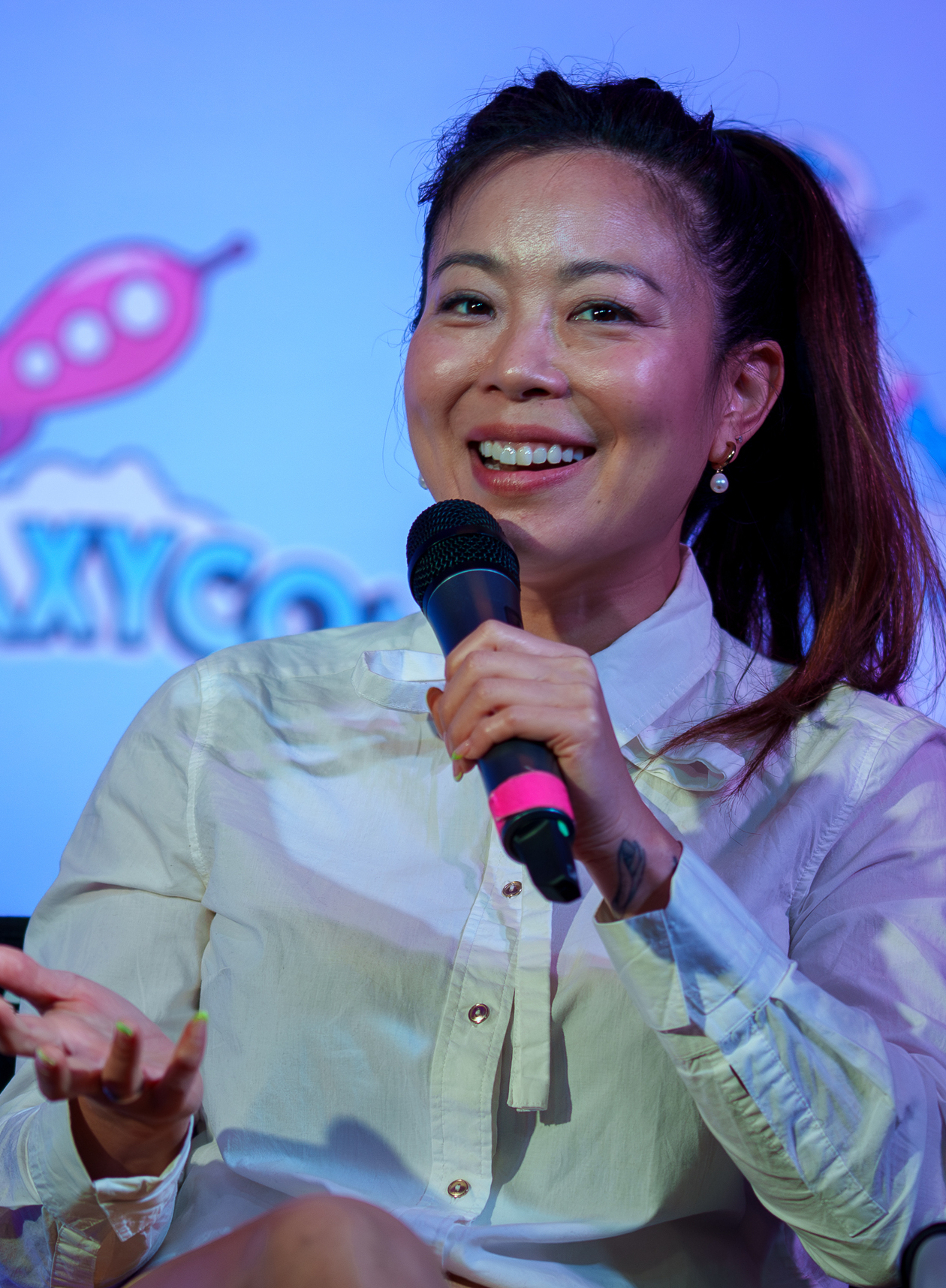
- Ang in 2025
- Born: 17 October 1983 (age 43); Christchurch, New Zealand
- Education: Victoria University of Wellington
- Occupations: Actor; producer; director
- Years active: 1997–present
- Children: 1

Michelle Ang (born 17 October 1983) is an actress, director and producer from New Zealand. Working mainly in film and television, she has won various professional accolades, including Best Actress at the New Zealand Film & Television Awards and Best Director at Show Me Shorts. Ang's acting work has also been nominated for a Primetime Emmy Award in the US and a Logie in Australia.

On television, her notable roles include Omega in Lucasfilm's Star Wars: The Bad Batch, Lori Lee in Australian soap opera Neighbours, and Alex in Fear the Walking Dead: Flight 462.

On film, Ang has had leading and supporting roles in a range of dramas and comedies. As a supporting cast member in Hollywood movies, she has performed alongside actors such as Woody Harrelson, Kate Winslet, Martin Lawrence, Chiwetel Ejiofor, Gal Gadot, Mark Wahlberg and Aaron Paul. She has also worked for directors such as Steven Soderbergh, Jodie Foster, Shane Black and Jane Campion.

In recent years, Ang's work has widened into directing and producing. She is a member of the Directors and Editors Guild of Aotearoa New Zealand (DEGANZ). She nurtures young talent in her industry, as a guest mentor for the charitable filmmaking project Day One, based in Auckland. Ang also runs her own media production company called A Grain Of Rice.

== Early life and education ==
Ang was born in Christchurch and is of Malaysian Chinese descent. She grew up in Wellington with her parents and younger sister.

As a child, she was a dancer and performed with the Royal New Zealand Ballet in productions of The Nutcracker, A Midsummer Night's Dream and Romeo and Juliet.

As a university student, she completed studies at Victoria University of Wellington for a double degree: a Bachelor of Commerce and Administration (B.C.A.) in Accounting with Commercial Law and a Bachelor of Science in Chemistry.

== Career ==
=== Television ===
Ang got her start in television at a young age through the family series Young Entertainers. Here, she got to show her skills at singing and dancing, much like The Mickey Mouse Club show on US television. She played Tai-San in the New Zealand post-apocalyptic drama The Tribe as part of the core cast from 1999 to 2001, and featured in the final episodes of the 2002 series. Ang also guest starred in the final 2 episodes of Xena: Warrior Princess as Akemi.

Ang played Lori Lee in the Australian television soap opera Neighbours, in which she was a major character from 2002 to 2003. Ang left Neighbours to finish her university studies but returned briefly in 2004. She appeared in 80 episodes in total. Ang was nominated for a Logie Award for Most Popular New Female Talent for this role.

She played the role of Tracy Hong in the first two seasons of the New Zealand TV series Outrageous Fortune in 2005 and 2006.

In 2007, Ang appeared in the American television drama South of Nowhere.

In 2012, Ang starred in the MTV series Underemployed as an aspiring writer who has to settle for working at a donut shop.

In 2015, Ang starred in the web series Fear the Walking Dead: Flight 462 as Alex, a passenger caught on a flight at the beginning of the zombie apocalypse, and went on to appear in the main series Fear the Walking Dead. Ang received an Emmy nomination for her work on Flight 462.

In 2020, she had a recurring role in The New Legends of Monkey. She also guest starred in the rebooted series of The Twilight Zone screened on CBS All Access.

In 2021 to 2024, Ang voiced a lead role in the Disney+ original animated series Star Wars: The Bad Batch as Omega, a mysterious female clone of Jango Fett. She was invited to keep her native New Zealand accent for the role in homage to fellow New Zealander Temuera Morrison, who portrayed Jango Fett in the franchise.

In 2023, Ang starred as Melissa Wu in the comedy series Homebound 3.0. It was initially screened in New Zealand on the Warner Bros. Discovery channel Three, which commissioned it. It has also been made available internationally via the BBC. In 2024, the series was renewed for a second season, which was broadcast in 2025.

Also in 2025, Ang started work as a Series Producer for Be With Zee, an animated pre-school series to be broadcast in 2026. The series is a co-production between companies and broadcasters in New Zealand and Canada.

=== Film ===
Ang made her feature film debut in 2004's Futile Attraction. Ang had also appeared in a series of low-budget New Zealand short films including Forbidden Fury and Take 3. In 2006 she appeared in No.2, directed by Toa Fraser.

In 2011 Ang portrayed a nerdy Chinese New Zealander in the romantic comedy My Wedding and Other Secrets, her first lead role in a feature. It won her the Best Lead Actress in a Feature Film Award at the 2011 New Zealand Aotearoa Film & Television Awards.

Her other film credits include Big Mommas: Like Father, Like Son and Triple 9.

Prior to her role in The Bad Batch, Ang had auditioned for Star Wars: The Last Jedi. As a child, she had also auditioned for the Cho Chang role in Harry Potter and the Goblet of Fire.

== Personal life ==
Ang has a son.

Ang has named The Power of Now by Eckhart Tolle as a book that influenced her.

== Filmography ==
=== Film (as actor) ===
Year	Title	Role	Notes
2004	Forbidden Fury	Terry Spears	Short film
2004	Futile Attraction	Violet McKenzie	
2006	Naming Number Two	Grace	
2008	Take 3	Melanie Shum	Short film
2010	The Beaver	Japanese translator	
2011	Big Mommas: Like Father, Like Son	Mia	Feature film
2011	My Wedding and Other Secrets	Emily	
2011	The Potential Wives of Norman Mao	Suzy Fong	Short film
2013	Echoes	Singer	Short film
2014	The Taking of Deborah Logan	Mia Medina	
2015	Fallen Stars	Daisy	
2016	Triple 9	Detective Trina Ling	Feature film
2017	Simularity	Daisy	Short film
2018	For Izzy	Dede	Feature film
2019	High Flying Bird	Rachel	Feature film
2019	I Want To Marry A Creative Jewish Girl	Rosy	Short film
2023	The Paragon	Beth	Feature film
2024	Nai/Milk	Kim	Short film
2025	POP!		Short film
2025	Insula		Feature, in production
2025	Play Dirty	Bett	Feature film

=== Television (as actor) ===
Year	Title	Role	Notes
1997–1998	Young Entertainers	Super Trooper	Regular cast
1999	William Shatner's A Twist in the Tale	Meesha	Season 1, Episode 14
1999–2002	The Tribe	Tai-San	Main role (seasons 1–3), 143 episodes
2001	Xena: Warrior Princess	Akemi	2 episodes
2002	Being Eve	Masako	Season 2, Episode 7
2002–2004	Neighbours	Lori Lee	88 episodes
2005	The Market	Victoria Chen	Recurring role
2005–2006	Outrageous Fortune	Tracy Hong	16 episodes
2007–2008	South of Nowhere	Lily Zee	4 episodes
2012–2013	Underemployed	Sophia Swanson	12 episodes
2013	Top of the Lake	Kimmie	2 episodes; Mini-series
2013	Grey's Anatomy	Cherise	Season 9, Episode 22
2013	Drop Dead Diva	Lanfen	Season 5, Episode 7
2013	Perception	Former National Guardwoman	Season 2, Episode 10
2014	Rizzoli & Isles	Lucy Chen	Season 5, Episode 11
2015	NCIS: Los Angeles	Taman Budiano	Season 6, Episode 19 "Blazing Glory"
2015–2016	Fear the Walking Dead: Flight 462	Alex	Main role, web series, 16 episodes
2016	Fear the Walking Dead	Alex	Season 2, 2 episodes
2017	Best Thing You'll Ever Do	Sena	
2020	The New Legends of Monkey	General Khan	Season 2, 7 Episodes
2020	The Twilight Zone	Ling	Season 2, Episode 6
2021	Vegas	Miranda Lau	6 episodes
2021	My Life is Murder	Kathleen Boyce	Season 2, Episode 3
2021	Destination Love	Lisa	TV movie
2021–2023	Good Grief	Michelle	Seasons 1 & 2
2021–2024	Star Wars: The Bad Batch	Omega	Main role, Seasons 1-3, 47 episodes
2023–2025	Homebound 3.0	Melissa Wu	Lead role, Seasons 1 & 2, 16 episodes

=== Video Games ===
Year	Title	Role	Notes
2023	Starfield	Sati Chandra	Voice

== Awards and nominations ==
Year	Award	Category	Work	Result
2003	Logie Award	Most Popular New Female Talent	Neighbours	Nominated
2011	New Zealand Film & Television Award	Best Lead Actress in a Feature Film	My Wedding and Other Secrets	Won
2016	Emmy Award	Outstanding Actress in a Short Form Comedy or Drama Series	Fear the Walking Dead: Flight 462	Nominated
2024	Show Me Shorts Film Festival	Best Actor	Nai/Milk	Nominated
2024	Show Me Shorts Film Festival	Best Director	Nai/Milk	Nominated
2025	Barbados International Film Festival	Best Actor	POP!	Won
