= Kate Keltie =

Australian actress (born 1986)

- Born: 23 February 1986 (age 40); Melbourne, Victoria, Australia
- Occupation: Actress
- Years active: 1991–2008; 2023

Kate Keltie (born 23 February 1986) is an Australian former actress, best known for her role as Michelle Scully in the Australian soap opera Neighbours.

== Early life ==
Keltie was born in Melbourne, Australia. She appeared in a number of television commercials and undertook drama, dance and voice training.

== Career ==
Keltie was eight years old when she made the first of three guest appearances in police drama Blue Heelers. She also appeared in Full Frontal, Halifax f.p., and ten episodes of the English language show More Than Words for ABC. She played the role of Becky Daniels in children's sci-fi drama Thunderstone from 1999 until 2000.

In 1999, Keltie joined the cast of the soap opera Neighbours as Michelle Scully. Being 13 at the time, Keltie completed her schooling with the help of an on-set tutor. In 2002, Keltie created and organised The Showbiz and Entertainment Expo, held at the Melbourne Convention and Exhibition Centre. Following the success of the first expo, a second one was held in August 2003. Keltie departed Neighbours in 2003 to return to school and pursue new roles. She made a brief return to the serial in 2004. She admitted that when she left Neighbours in 2003, she did not think she would come back, but she really enjoyed her character's return storyline. Keltie played Bec Cleary in Blue Heelers that same year. Her last television appearance was a guest role in an episode of Rush in 2008.

Keltie later worked in legal support in a law firm, and then moved into the recruitment-support industry. In July 2017, she joined Australian recruitment agency "people2people".

On 28 November 2022, it was announced that Keltie had been diagnosed with stage IV breast cancer. A fundraising page was set up by her family, as she was unable to work while undergoing chemotherapy. The page raised $37,362, before Keltie posted an update in February stating that she was cancer-free. She wrote "I recently received results of my latest scan and was told that there had been a complete metabolic response to diseased areas. In other words, it seems I am cancer-free." Keltie confirmed that she would not need surgery and instead would undergo indefinite monthly chemotherapy infusions. The fundraising page was subsequently deleted.

In 2023, Keltie reprised her role as Michelle Scully in Neighbours for an episode.

== Filmography ==
=== Television ===
Year	Title	Role	Type
1994	Full Frontal		TV series
1991	More Than Words	Rosa	TV series, 10 episodes
1994–2004	Blue Heelers	Bec Cleary / Briana Tomminello / Sally Lamont	TV series, 5 episodes
1996	Halifax f.p.	Michelle	TV series, season 1, episode 7
1999–2000	Thunderstone	Becky Daniels	TV series, seasons 1–3, 50 episodes
1999–2003; 2004; 2023	Neighbours	Michelle Scully	TV series, 389 episodes
2000	Neighbours Revealed	Self	TV series, 2 episodes
2003	Sn: TV		TV series, 1 episode
2008	Rush	Abbie	TV series, 1 episode
2019	Lexus Melbourne Cup Day	Reporter	TV special
