= The plane crash (Neighbours) =

2005 storyline in Neighbours

"The plane crash" is a storyline from the Australian television soap opera Neighbours that began on 24 October 2005 when an aeroplane, carrying several characters, crashed in Bass Strait after a bomb was detonated during the journey. The storyline aired as part of the show's 20th anniversary and would be the catalyst for several major storylines that aired the following year. "The plane crash" also saw the departures of three established characters: David (Kevin Harrington), Liljana (Marcella Russo) and Serena Bishop (Lara Sacher). The actors' departures had been announced in May 2005, but it was not confirmed they would depart during "The plane crash" until their last scenes aired.

The scenes featuring the flight were shot inside a real Douglas DC-3 aeroplane in Essendon. Filming in the DC-3 was difficult due to its small size. Special effects were added in post-production to make it look like the aircraft was moving, while strobe lights and smoke were used to create the effect of the explosion. The scenes featuring the aftermath of the crash were filmed over two days in a purpose-built swimming pool at the Global Studios in South Melbourne. A wave machine was used to create the effect of the ocean and pieces of fuselage were also dropped into the pool. Some scenes had to be cut because they would have been too disturbing to show in the soap's time slot.

"The plane crash" received a mixed response from television critics. Darren Devlyn from the Herald Sun called it "the most controversial story arc in the soap's history". A Daily Record reporter thought previous disastrous events "pale in comparison", while another critic thought it was "incredible". Brian Courtis from The Age did not like the crash and asked viewers to "suspend your sense of disbelief", while an Inside Soap columnist thought the storyline was implausible and contrived. "The plane crash" received a nomination for Best Storyline at the 2006 Inside Soap Awards and has been included in several features about Neighbours' most memorable moments.

== Plot ==
To celebrate the 20th anniversary of the Lassiter's complex in Erinsborough, businessman and Lassiter's Hotel owner Paul Robinson (Stefan Dennis) decides to take some employees and Ramsay Street residents on a 1940s-style joy flight to Tasmania. Tickets are given out to Harold Bishop (Ian Smith), Lou Carpenter (Tom Oliver), Karl Kennedy (Alan Fletcher) and Toadfish Rebecchi (Ryan Moloney). Days before the flight, Dylan Timmins (Damien Bodie) takes part in a robbery, while Connor O'Neill (Patrick Harvey) fakes a burglary at the shop that he co-owns with Toadie and Serena Bishop (Lara Sacher). Paul agrees to help Dylan and gives him a ticket for the flight, warning him that he might not be able to return home. Several of those given tickets choose to give them away; Harold gives his tickets to his son David (Kevin Harrington) and his wife Lijana (Marcella Russo), Karl gives his to his ex-wife Susan (Jackie Woodburne) and her fiancé Alex Kinski (Andrew Clarke), while Lou gives his to Serena and she invites Connor. Toadie decides not to use his, as he refuses to fly with Connor. Dylan invites his girlfriend Sky Mangel (Stephanie McIntosh), while Paul invites his girlfriend Izzy Hoyland (Natalie Bassingthwaighte) and his daughter Elle (Pippa Black). Six hours before the flight, a mysterious person enters a hangar and attaches a bomb to the aircraft's engine. Next to the bomb, the person places a picture of Paul and Izzy.

As the aeroplane leaves the mainland behind and flies over the Bass Strait, the bomb detonates, destroying one of the engines. Paul tries to find out what has happened, but is told to sit down by the pilots, who try to work out how to land the aeroplane. Everyone puts on their life jackets and Paul tries to assure David that the pilots have everything under control. Paul comforts Elle, Susan tells Alex that Karl will look after his children, Izzy calls Karl to tell him she loves him, David and Liljana kiss, Connor and Serena cling together and Dylan and Sky accept their fate. The pilots struggle to control the DC-3 and when it finally runs out of fuel, it descends quickly into the ocean. Serena and Connor become trapped under a piece of wreckage, and are forced to remove their life jackets to reach the surface of the water. Susan clings onto a piece of wreckage outside, calling for Alex. Izzy appears and Susan grabs her and pulls her over to her. When they hear Elle screaming for help, Izzy goes to her, despite Susan telling her not to. Susan slowly slips under the water. Paul, Izzy, Elle, Alex and Sky are found by rescue helicopters in the 24 hours following the crash. Susan is found after three days, having washed up on the shore. Connor and Dylan also wash up on shore, but decide to take the opportunity to be assumed dead and escape arrest.

David's body is found the following week, while Liljana and Serena remain missing, presumed drowned. Dylan learns from the local newspaper that Sky is alive and his brother is facing arrest for the robbery. He decides to return home, and he interrupts his own funeral. Weeks later, while doing some work for The Salvation Army, Harold discovers Connor living on the streets and persuades him to come home. A memorial service is held for David, Liljana and Serena. A devastated Harold blames Paul for the loss of his family and he strangles him. Paul eventually forgives Harold, as he himself believes that his bad actions towards others led to the bomb being on the aeroplane. Months later, Paul's son Robert (Adam Hunter) confesses to planting the bomb in an attempt to kill Paul, Elle and Izzy. For several months, he had been masquerading as his identical twin Cameron (also Adam Hunter), who was in a coma. Robert placed Cameron's fingerprints on various weapons while visiting him, and left them for police to find along with diaries in Cameron's name that planned the bombing. Robert attempts to kill Paul, Elle and Izzy again, but his efforts fail. Robert is eventually arrested and sent to prison.

== Production ==
=== Conception and development ===
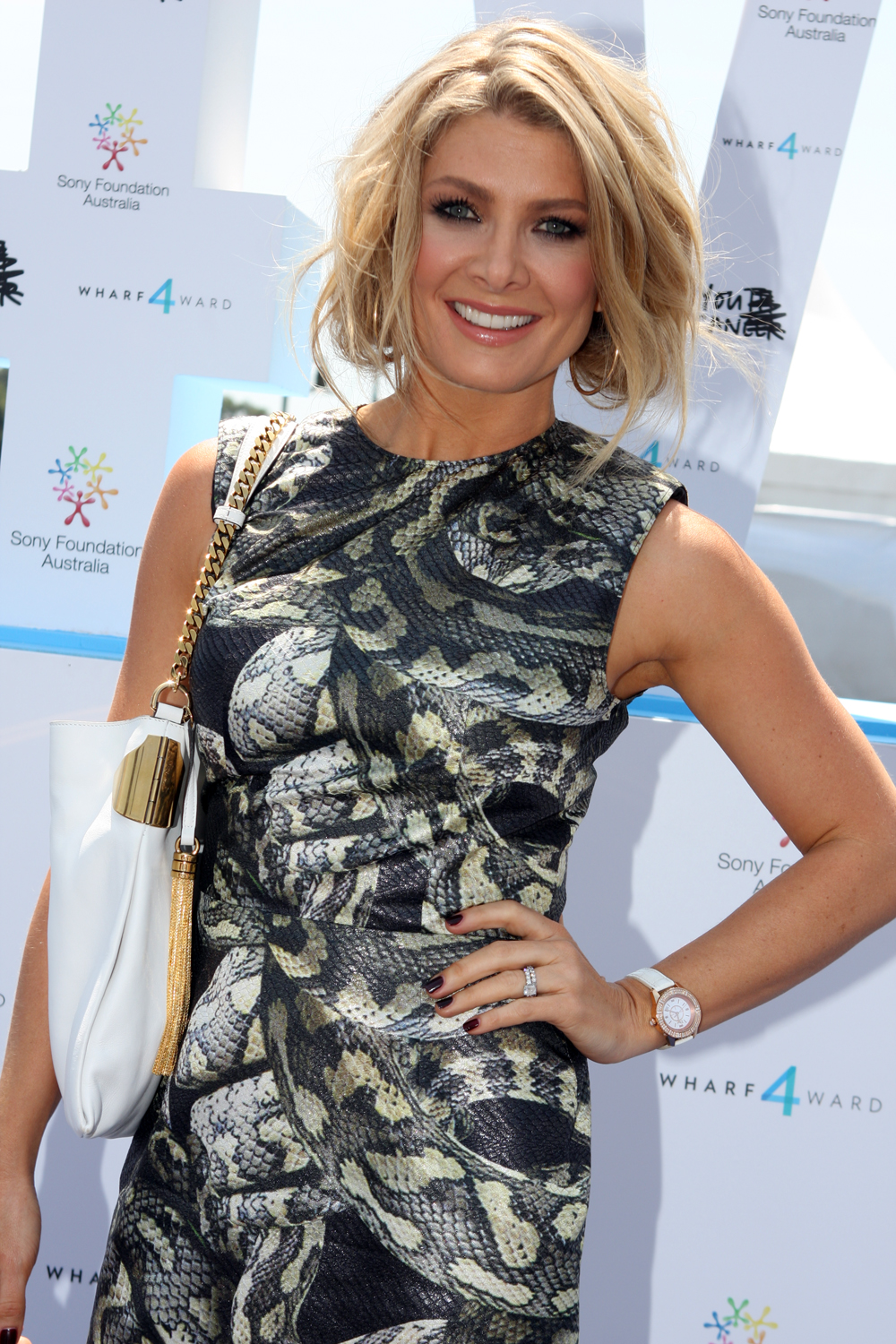
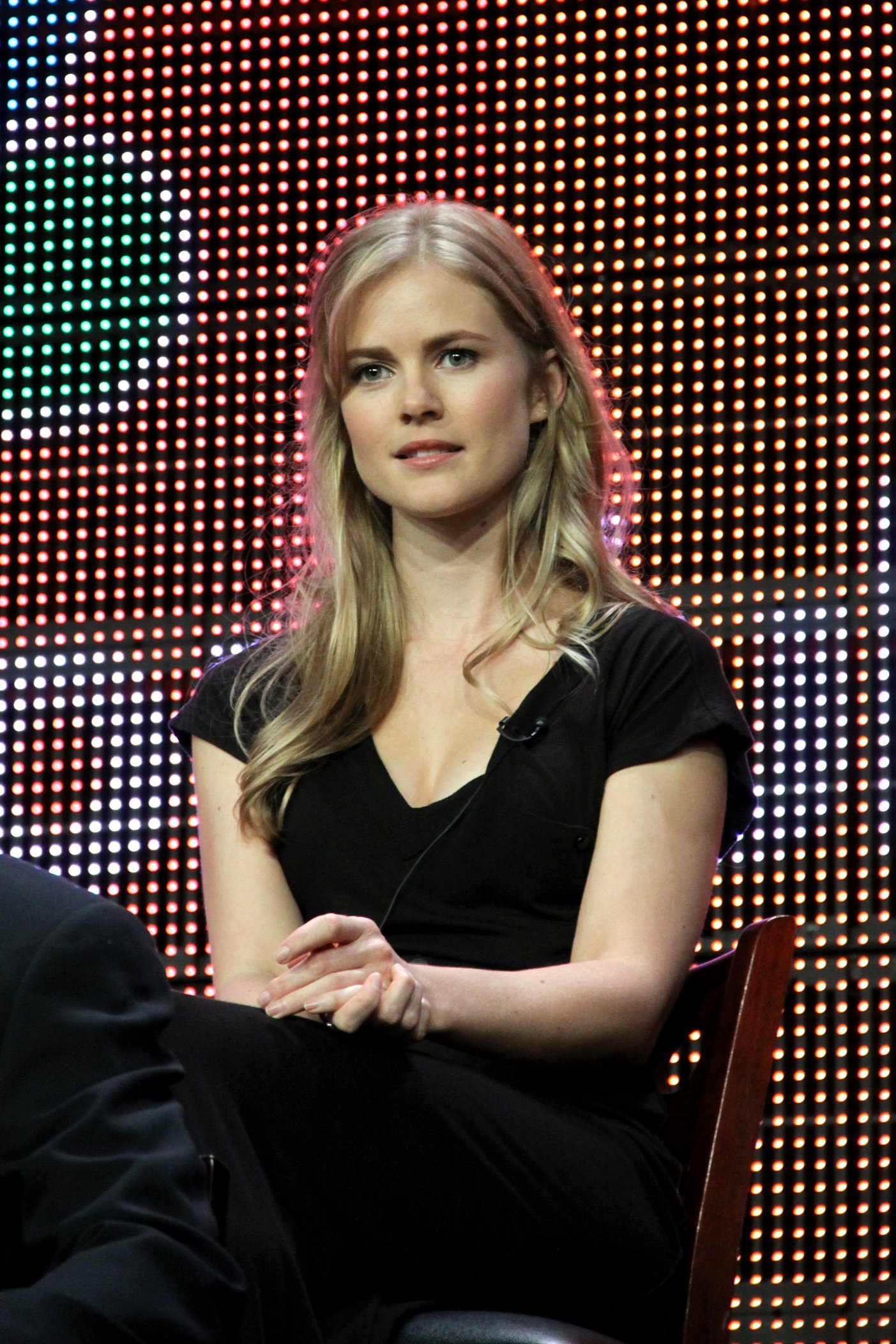
Both Natalie Bassingthwaighte (left) and Pippa Black's (right) characters were on the aeroplane

On 16 October, Kris Green from Digital Spy confirmed rumours about an aircraft crash storyline were true. Green reported that the storyline would be broadcast as part of Neighbours' 20th anniversary year. He revealed that a bomb would be detonated during a flight to Tasmania, sending the aeroplane crashing into the ocean. He also reported that three characters would die during the storyline and confirmed that those on board would be; Paul Robinson (Stefan Dennis), Elle Robinson (Pippa Black), Izzy Hoyland (Natalie Bassingthwaighte), Connor O'Neill (Patrick Harvey), Serena Bishop (Lara Sacher), Sky Mangel (Stephanie McIntosh), Dylan Timmins (Damien Bodie), Susan Kennedy (Jackie Woodburne), Alex Kinski (Andrew Clarke), David Bishop (Kevin Harrington) and Liljana Bishop (Marcella Russo). Green added that the bomber's target would survive the crash, the three deaths would affect an older character who plans revenge, while two survivors would fake their own deaths to evade the police.

At the time of the storyline's conception, there was a threat of terrorism in Australia and bombings had occurred in London and Bali. Neighbours producer Peter Dodds did not think there would be a backlash against the show and said they would not shy away from telling stories that could upset people who have experienced similar events. He told the Herald Sun's Darren Devlyn, "We feel we have made these episodes in good taste. No bomb-making is seen. I don't think the audience will make a connection (with Bali). I don't think people will be offended. There has been a great deal of consideration into how we have gone about creating this storyline. You don't lose any cast member without intense thought and planning and it took us a long time to settle on how we tackled this." The show's line producer Linda Walker stated that the episodes would be the catalyst for major changes in future storylines. Walker explained that they would not be changing the whole show, but as a result of the crash, some characters would not be thinking rationally, and it would set up some major storylines for the following year.

The 1940s' themed joy flight was set to commemorate 20 years of the Lassiter's complex. Bassingthwaighte said there was a lot of excitement in the build up to the flight, but also some tension as many of the passengers could not stand Paul Robinson. Izzy and Elle were also "at each other's throats", but hid their animosity from the others. When the aeroplane took off, viewers were aware that there was a bomb on board. The first indication that the characters got that something was wrong was when Izzy found a note near her seat that said "Think about your life and everything you've done." Shortly after the aeroplane left mainland Australia and was over Bass Strait, the passengers heard a loud noise as the bomb detonated and it began to go down. Bassingthwaighte stated that in the confusion no one knew what was going on and initially thought it was minor engine trouble. As the aeroplane crashed into the sea and slowly began to sink, Bassingthwaighte said that everyone was terrified because it was dark and they did not know what was happening. The characters were left stranded in the middle of the Bass Strait. As they struggled to stay alive, their family and friends gathered together to wait for news of survivors.

Once the scenes aired, it was confirmed that David, Liljana and Serena Bishop had been killed off. David's body was washed ashore, but Liljana and Serena's bodies were never found and it was presumed they had drowned. An announcement about Lara Sacher, Kevin Harrington and Marcella Russo's departures from the show had been released in May 2005, but it was only confirmed that they would leave as part of a "dramatic" storyline. Script producer Luke Devenish had teased their departures, saying "Lil and David have been at the very forefront of stories this year – caught up in wicked Paul's web – and their departure ties into this. The door will be left open for their return, however, despite the spectacular circumstances. Serena's final scenes will be nothing short of heartbreaking – but very memorable!" It later emerged that Paul's son Robert (Adam Hunter) had caused the aeroplane crash. Robert made further attempts to kill his father, sister and Izzy, because he was angry that Paul had abandoned him when he was younger.

=== Filming ===
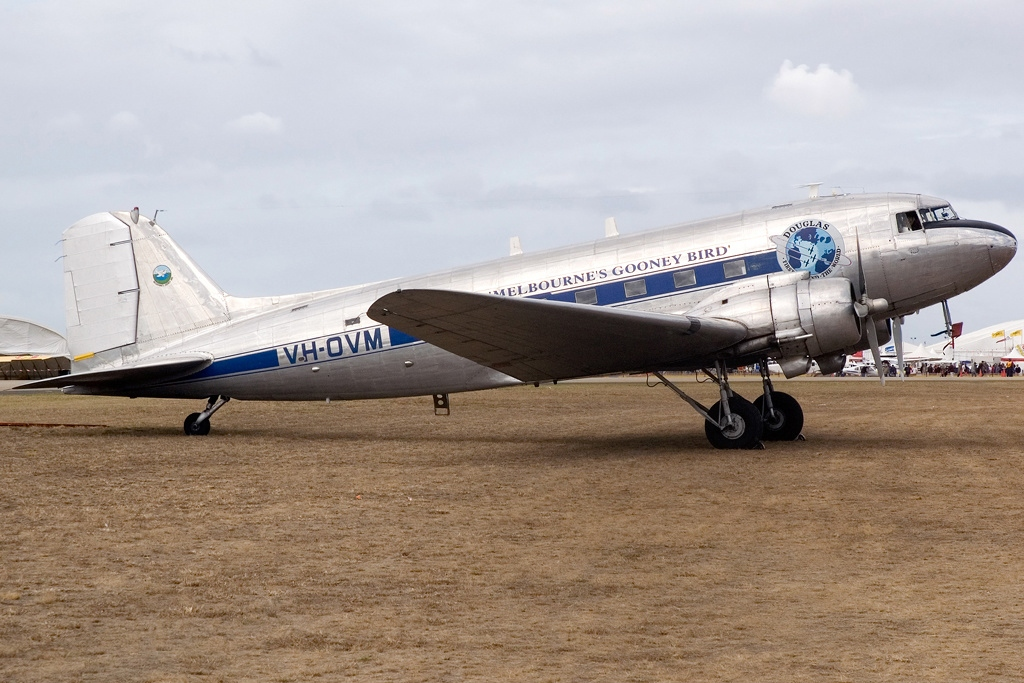
The scenes featuring the characters on the aeroplane were filmed aboard this Douglas DC-3 in an airport hangar

The first half of the scenes featuring the flight were shot inside a Douglas DC-3 aeroplane in a hangar in Essendon. A real DC-3 was used to make the scenes look as realistic as possible. Filming inside the cabin was not easy as it was small and cramped, especially once the camera and lighting crews were inside. During filming, the actors who were in the shot were the only ones on board. Once their scenes were shot, they disembarked and their places taken by their co-stars. The camera crew also had to take out seats to be able to shoot from different angles. As the DC-3 was static in the hangar, special effects were added in post-production to make it look like it was moving. To create the effect of the explosion, strobe lights and smoke were used, while the cast had to throw themselves around the cabin.

The scenes featuring the aftermath of the crash were filmed at the Global Studios in South Melbourne in a purpose-built swimming pool, once used for the Man O Man game show. The scenes took two days to be filmed and the cast spent around six hours in the pool, which was heated to prevent them from getting ill. There were also three divers on hand to make sure the cast were safe. Actress Pippa Black explained "Once the studio was blacked out for the scenes at sea, it was so eerie. We had a tiny bit of light to represent the moon, but that was it." A wave machine was used to create the effect of the ocean waves and pieces of fuselage were also dropped into the pool with the actors. Black added that many scenes had to be cut because they would have been too disturbing to show in the serial's time slot.

The scenes featuring Dylan and Connor washing up on the shore and becoming fugitives were filmed on Phillip Island and in bushland, an hour's drive from the Neighbours studios. Bodie joked, "It was fun (being) driven to insanity. You're killing rabbits, trying to find fish, howling at the moon!" Both Bodie and Harvey wore the same clothes for around three weeks and the wardrobe department could not wash them, to make the scenes more authentic. Bodie eventually grew attached to his suit, even though it was itchy and muddy.

== Reception ==
When the storyline aired in the UK in 2006, it was watched by 6.75 million viewers. The storyline received a mixed response from critics. Darren Devlyn from the Herald Sun stated that "The plane crash" was "arguably the most controversial story arc in the soap's history." Doug Anderson, writing for The Sydney Morning Herald, enjoyed the storyline branding it "the plane crash we had to have." He also suggested Network Ten should have had a competition for viewers to select which characters should survive and die in a "Big Brother meets Agatha Christie" style. Anderson was upset at the thought of Susan Kennedy dying and questioned "They wouldn't kill her off, surely." A Daily Record reporter commented that while the Ramsay Street residents were not strangers to disasters, all previous events "pale in comparison" to the "shocking" plane crash.

Brian Courtis from The Age was not a fan of the storyline giving it two stars during his review. He quipped "suspend your sense of disbelief, appreciate the Flash Gordon modelling delights, wait for that squib to explode on the model plane and appreciate the lighting of the bath tubs standing in for the Bass Strait. It's all a little like The High and the Mighty, with Connor, Dylan, Sky, Izzy, Elle and the Bishop family instead of John Wayne. Used to be a time when they just sent the show's cast-offs to Brisbane." Courtis later wrote that the crash was something the show "needed to happen" in order to boost falling ratings. Writing for The Guardian, Mark Lawson observed the storyline had turned Neighbours into "a Melbourne Medea, driven crazy, like so many modern soap operas, by the war for audiences in a business in which supply far exceeds demand."

Anna Roberts of the Western Mail branded the storyline "incredible" and noted that it had led to the death of "three of its most disposable characters." The Sunday Mirror's Kevin O'Sullivan joked about wanting the characters on the aeroplane to die, stating "Dramatic scenes as a sizeable slice of the Neighbours gang went down in a plane crash on their way to Tasmania. But – just as I was about to crack open the champagne – the devastating news came through. They survived." An Inside Soap columnist thought the storyline was implausible. They wrote "the plane tragedy that wiped out most of the Bishop family in Neighbours earlier this year just seemed too contrived." The columnist could not believe that "crazed" Robert had planted a bomb on the aeroplane, adding "Pull the other one!"

"The plane crash" was nominated for Best Storyline at the 2006 Inside Soap Awards. Ashley Percival from The Huffington Post UK placed the storyline on their list of Top 10 Classic Moments from the show. While the storyline came ninth in a Virgin Media feature on "Soap's most explosive moments". Sarah Megginson from SheKnows included the storyline in her list of the "8 Most Memorable Neighbours moments" and observed "No one was more shocked than Paul when it was revealed that the culprit was none other than Paul's son, Robert, who planted the bomb in an effort to kill his dad!" "The plane crash" was named the third weirdest Neighbours storyline ever by a contributor to LastBroadcast. The Daily Record's Brian McIver called it was one of soap's biggest disasters, saying "The genteel and suburban Australian soap went all Dynasty to mark its 20th anniversary with a plane explosion and crash." In 2015, a Herald Sun reporter included the plane crash in their "Neighbours' 30 most memorable moments" feature.
