= Angie Rebecchi =

Fictional character from Neighbours

- Neighbours character
- Lesley Baker as Angie Rebecchi (2008)
- Portrayed by: Lesley Baker
- Duration: 1995–1996, 2002–2006, 2008, 2013, 2015, 2017–2019, 2022–2023
- First appearance: 17 January 1995
- Last appearance: 19 September 2023
- Introduced by: Stanley Walsh (1995); Ric Pellizerri (2003); Richard Jasek (2013); Jason Herbison (2015)
- Spin-off appearances: Summer Stories (2017)
In-universe information
- Occupation: The Holy Roll owner Roadhouse manager
- Sisters: Coral Reeves; Rhonda Brooks
- Husband: Kevin Rebecchi (until 2025)
- Sons: Shane Rebecchi; Stonefish Rebecchi; Toadie Rebecchi
- Grandsons: Callum Rebecchi; Jay Rebecchi; Hugo Somers
- Granddaughters: Yashvi Rebecchi; Kirsha Rebecchi; Nell Rebecchi
- Nephews: Tad Reeves (adopted)
- Nieces: Gemma Reeves; Georgia Brooks

Angie Rebecchi is a fictional character from the Australian soap opera Neighbours, played by Lesley Baker. She made her first screen appearance during the episode broadcast on 17 January 1995. Angie departed in 1996, but she returned for several weeks in 2002 and then in 2003 for her youngest son Toadie's wedding to Dee Bliss. The following year, Angie made another brief visit and she made a cameo in the 20th anniversary episode, which was broadcast in July 2005. The character returned again in 2006 and 2008. Baker reprised the role in February 2013, and again in August 2015. After a brief appearance in the Summer Stories webisodes in January 2017, Angie made guest returns in April and December 2017, on 12 February 2018, 11 March 2019 and in July 2022 for the show's finale. Angie came back for the first few episodes of the show’s return in 2023.

== Casting ==
Baker was initially brought into Neighbours for a couple of episodes, but when her character proved popular with viewers, she was taken on full-time. Of her time in the Neighbours, Baker told Jason Herbison of Inside Soap "Angie lived in Ramsay Street for two and half years and I had the time of my life. Even now, a lot of people say we were the most realistic family ever to be on the show." In 2002, Baker agreed to return to Neighbours for brief stint as part of "emergency storylines", which were written to cover Madeleine West's (Dee Bliss) sudden absence. Baker reprised her role for the soap's 20th anniversary episode, which was broadcast in July 2005.

== Development ==
"A more caring and hospitable person you could not hope to meet – although if you didn't know her you wouldn't have believed it. Angie and Big Kev would have the most outrageous arguments – usually, for the whole street to hear."

— A BBC writer on Angie

A writer for the BBC's Neighbours website described Angie as being "salt of the earth" and a "rough diamond." They explained that she is "a devoted mother and tireless worker", though she could often be brash. Inside Soap's Jason Herbison said Angie was the source of much comic relief in Neighbours and he commented "Whether pulling sons, Toadie and Stonefish, into line or gossiping with the neighbours, she was always the centre of attention. Baker believed that above all, Angie was a good mother and always had her boys' best interests at heart. She later quipped "I just love Angie – she's feisty. But, the whole point about her is that she's also absolutely, deadset genuine. She just doesn't have a lot of subtlety in the way she goes about things." A writer for the official Neighbours website called Angie a "no nonsense character" and the "unconventional matriarch of the Rebecchi clan." In 2015, Baker admitted that Angie was "over the top but also very down to earth." She uses her common sense and is "warm-hearted."

Despite being married to Kevin Rebecchi (Don Bridges), Angie had an affair with Mick Andrews (Mike Bishop), a possum catcher. Baker revealed that this was her favourite storyline and she recalled that it gave her the chance to play her first love scene. The actress explained "Me and Mike Bishop, who played Mick, both pretended we knew what to do - when neither of us did! When you're teenagers it's fine, but at our age - what do you do?" Angie and Mick's affair was short-lived and she eventually returned to Kevin. The BBC writer said Angie's heart always belonged to him and they called the couple "soul mates."

On 12 January 2013, it was announced that Baker would be returning to Neighbours in February for a guest appearance. Baker was pleased to be asked back and commented that Angie was a popular character, who viewers had always identified with. The actress added that she was a little nervous for her first day back and had to watch some footage of her previous performances to get back into character. Of the character's return, executive producer, Richard Jasek, stated "Angie is one of those wonderful characters without even being conscious of it, causes strife from the moment she steps through the door and it's always lovely to have Lesley come visit us again." Angie comes to Ramsay Street to visit her new granddaughter, Nell (Scarlett Anderson), causing Toadie to find "himself negotiating his way through a minefield of personality clashes." Angie immediately makes her presence felt. She gets off on the wrong foot Toadie's partner, Sonya (Eve Morey), and they clash over their different parenting styles. Baker explained "Straight away, Angie starts telling Sonya how to do things with the baby, with the best intentions she always means well. Angie thinks she's more than with it, actually. Of course, she's also so excited to meet her grand-daughter."

Angie returned from 17 August 2015 to help nurse Toadie, following an accident that left him paralysed. Baker told Digital Spy's Daniel Kilkelly that she loved bringing Angie back to Neighbours and had no problem getting back into character. Baker explained that Angie would initially be in denial about the severity of Toadie's condition, and that her way of coping was to "fix it and not dwell on worst case scenarios." Angie and Sonya clashed over Toadie's care. Baker said Angie did not dislike Sonya, but thought they had very different personalities. She said Sonya "overthinks things", while Angie is the opposite and often acts immediately without consulting anyone. Baker could see that Angie's actions were frustrating to Sonya, but she just wanted to help out and look after everyone. Baker was also joined by Anthony Engelmen, who plays Stonefish, and she commented that it was good to catch up with him and be around her two on-screen sons again. As well as caring for Toadie, Angie also realised that her niece's husband Kyle (Chris Milligan) had developed feelings for Sonya's lodger Amy Williams (Zoe Cramond). Angie then clashed with Kyle's grandmother Sheila Canning (Colette Mann) and Baker told Kilkelly that both women wanted to be "top dog of the older generation." The character returned on 19 April 2017, following the breakdown of Toadie's marriage and elder son Shane's (Nicholas Coghlan) return to Erinsborough. Angie confronts Sonya over her break up with Toadie. She returned again on 11 March 2019 to attend Sonya's funeral.

Baker was one of over twenty actors who reprised their roles for the serial's final episodes, following its cancellation. Baker's return scenes were broadcast on 14 July in the UK and 21 July 2022 in Australia, as she returns for Toadie's engagement party. Angie takes an instant dislike to Toadie's fiancée Melanie Pearson (Lucinda Cowden). During the party, Angie makes several "digs" at Melanie, leading Melanie to yell at her. Toadie then asks Angie to leave the party. Angie later apologises. Baker made a surprise return to the serial as Angie in 2023 during the serial's reboot episode premiere. She returns to support Toadie in her wedding to Terese Willis (Rebekah Elmaloglou). Her return was kept secret up to the episode's broadcast in order to cover Terese and Toadie's marriage.

== Storylines ==
Angie, her husband Kevin "Big Kev "Rebecchi, and their three sons; Shane (Greg O'Meara), Kevin Jr. (Anthony Engelman) and Jarrod (Ryan Moloney) move into Number 32 Ramsay Street from West Waratah. Shane is soon uncovered as the Ramsay Street thief much to Angie's shame and the family move back to West Waratah. However, the family frequently appear on Ramsay Street due to the friends they have made and are back living in Number 32 by the end of the year. Angie later takes over the lease of the coffee shop when Mark Gottlieb (Bruce Samazan) relocates to Sydney. During Big Kev's absences due to him being a trucker, Angie finds herself lonely and begins enjoying the company of Mick Anderson, a pest exterminator. Toadie, Angie's youngest son becomes immediately suspicious and confronts her after he learns Mick kissed Angie but she assures him she and Mick are just friends and she still loves his father.

After visiting Big Kev up North, Angie takes the decision to move the family to join him to open a roadhouse. Stonie, after splitting up with girlfriend Catherine O'Brien (Radha Mitchell) decides he has nothing lose and is in favour of the move. However, Toadie refuses to budge, Angie is hurt at first but understands and arranges with Karl (Alan Fletcher) and Susan Kennedy (Jackie Woodburne) to have Toadie live with them. Angie and Stonie bid farewell to Erinsborough and Toadie frequently visits them. Six years later, Angie and Kev return to Erinsborough where Toadie has arranged a surprise 30th wedding anniversary party for them at Lou's Place. Problems in the marriage are evident when Angie and Kev argue. Toadie and his housemate Stuart Parker (Blair McDonough) try to mediate the couple's squabbles. Angie later wins the lottery and Kev tries to keep her sweet in order to get his hands on the ticket she keeps in her bra. Kev later claims the winnings and skips town leaving a note saying he will see her in Rio leaving Angie devastated. After Kev suffers guilt over his actions and apologises, Angie plays him at his own game by pretending to run off with the money herself. The couple then buy a camper van and leave to reaffirm their marriage.

When Toadie is due to marry Dee Bliss the following year, Kev, Angie and Stonie return for the event. Angie and Dee argue but soon put their differences aside. After Dee is presumed drowned in a car accident, Angie and Kev try to help Toadie out of his depression but are unable to and leave. Several months later Stuart phones Angie to tell her Toadie has gone missing and she returns to Erinsborough. Stuart and Connor O'Neill (Patrick Harvey) explain about Toadie having problems with his current girlfriend Sindi Watts (Marisa Warrington) previously being a lapdancer, Angie goes over to Number 28 where Sindi is living and confronts her but realizes that Toadie wouldn't leave after a revelation like that. After learning Toadie is safe, Angie prepares to leave but wants her 16-year-old nephew Stingray Timmins (Ben Nicholas) to return with her to Colac so his parents can resume responsibility for him, but Susan agrees to take Stingray on herself as she did with Toadie eight years previously. Angie appears in Annalise Hartman's (Kimberley Davies) documentary about Ramsay Street, praising Susan, Harold Bishop (Ian Smith) and Lou Carpenter (Tom Oliver) for being steadying influences in Toadie's life.

A year later, Angie returns to Ramsay Street and helps Harold and Lou battle against Paul Robinson (Stefan Dennis), who has opened a rival restaurant to their General store. She battles sister-in-law Janelle Timmins (Nell Feeney) verbally and later physically in a boxing match where Angie lands the knockout blow after Janelle is distracted. The reason for their animosity is revealed when Janelle mentions she had always resented Angie marrying and taking her big brother, Kev away from her. The two sisters-in-law bury the hatchet. Angie later attends Janelle's re-wedding to her husband Kim (Brett Swain) and helps delay the police when they come looking for Kim over illegal DVD sales. Two years later, Angie and Kev return for Toadie's wedding to Stephanie Scully (Carla Bonner) which is called off when Toadie realises Steph is not fully committed to marrying him. Angie tries to get Toadie to reconsider but he is adamant he will not. Angie and Kev then leave.

Angie comes to Ramsay Street to visit her granddaughter, Nell, and to attend her naming day. Toadie tells Angie that the naming day has been postponed, before leaving her and his partner, Sonya, alone together. Sonya is not happy when Angie interferes and they start to clash over Nell's care, especially when Angie gives Nell formula milk. While she is in Harold's Store, Angie mentions to Vanessa Villante (Alin Sumarwata) that Toadie and Sonya have postponed Nell's naming day, so that it will not upset her because her own baby is in the hospital. The naming day goes ahead and afterwards, Toadie reveals that he has to go to Chile. Angie decides to stay longer to help Sonya with Nell, but Sonya feels that she is criticising and undermining her. When Angie spots Sonya taking some pills, she starts to worry that Sonya is on drugs. Sonya later catches Angie going through her bag and confronts her. Angie apologises, but Sonya asks her leave. Georgia Brooks (Saskia Hampele) tries to get them to talk, but Sonya refuses. Angie states that she and Big Kev will not be coming to the wedding, before leaving for Colac. A couple of weeks later, Angie returns for the wedding and she and Sonya apologise to each other.

When Angie learns that Toadie has suffered a fall and is paralysed, she returns to help care for him. She immediately starts fussing over her son, despite Sonya pointing out that she can care for her own husband. Sonya introduces Angie to her lodger Amy Williams and explains that Amy is creating a new floor plan to accommodate Toadie's wheelchair. Angie is surprised by the news, as Toadie had led her to believe he would be okay. When she notices the chemistry between Amy and Georgia's husband Kyle, Angie calls Georgia to ask when she will be returning home. Sheila Canning accuses Angie of flirting with her partner Russell Brennan (Russell Kiefel) and they fight. Angie advises Sonya to sue for compensation to help ease the family's financial troubles. After Angie picks Nell up from her first day at childcare, Sonya angrily confronts her and Angie decides to leave. After saying goodbye to Toadie, Angie goes back home.

Angie returns after Toadie and Sonya separate, and sends Shane (now Nicholas Coghlan) to check on his brother. She visits again shortly after Shane and his wife Dipi Rebecchi (Sharon Johal) move their family to Ramsay Street. Angie clashes with Sonya and suggests Toadie should go for custody of Nell. Months later, Angie's granddaughter Yashvi Rebecchi (Olivia Junkeer) tells her about Sonya's neighbourhood Christmas party and the variety show, Angie comes to Erinsborough. She is furious to learn that Toadie has reconciled with Sonya. After Dipi tells her that she is in danger of missing out on family events, including Sonya's surprise vow renewal for Toadie, Angie apologises to Sonya and agrees to accept Toadie's decision. Angie attends Sonya's memorial, after she dies from ovarian cancer. When her grandson Callum Rebecchi (Morgan Baker) struggles with his speech, Angie gets up to help him, by saying that Sonya was a good mother. During the wake, Angie remarks to Shane and Dipi that she cannot believe Toadie is going through this again and tells him how upset Toadie was after losing Dee. Shane and Dipi reassure Angie that they are looking after him and the children.

Angie returns to Erinsborough for Toadie's engagement party to Melanie Pearson. She takes a disliking towards Melanie and criticises her for drinking alcohol early in the party and tells her she does not like her clothes. Angie gets angry at her for giving the family short notice and explains that the rest of the family will not be able to make it in time. After making remarks about their wedding, Angie is yelled at by Melanie. Later, Angie tells her she was testing her to see if she would be a matching wife for Toadie and explains that she has passed the test. Angie attends her son's wedding and goes to the reception on Ramsay Street, where she befriends Vera Punt (Sally-Anne Upton) and parties with the street's residents. Two years later, Angie attends Toadie's wedding to Terese Willis.

== Reception ==
When Baker first left the show, fans of her character launched a "Bring back Angie" petition and she was eventually reinstated. A writer for the BBC said Angie's most notable moment was "Kissing the possom man, Mick Andrews." Jackie Brygel from TV Week branded Angie an "interfering, larger-than-life character." Dianne Butler, writing for The Daily Telegraph, commented "Sonya might have to be careful - her mother-in-law Angie's done time on Prisoner. She'll know how to make a weapon out of soap. If it comes to that. I'm saying nothing." A Sunday Mercury reporter branded the character "Awful Angie" and said she had a "big mouth". While Sasha Morris of the Daily Star dubbed Angie a "fan favourite". Simon Hughes of The Age was "enamored" of Angie and said that her "carborundum voice could strip a ship's bottom." Of Angie's dislike for her sons' wives and girlfriends, Joe Julians of Digital Spy said, "Angie has been a force to be reckoned with ever since we first met her."
