= Stuart Parker (Neighbours) =

- Neighbours character
- Portrayed by: Blair McDonough
- Duration: 2001–2006, 2018, 2022
- First appearance: 13 December 2001
- Last appearance: 28 July 2022
- Introduced by: Stanley Walsh (2001); Jason Herbison (2018)
In-universe information
- Occupation: Mechanic; Soldier; Hospital porter; Chauffeur; Police officer
- Father: Jim Parker
- Mother: Kitty Parker
- Brothers: Ned Parker
- Half-brothers: Steve Parker
- Wife: Sindi Watts (2005–; divorced)
- Aunts: Raylene Manson

Stuart Parker is a fictional character from the Australian soap opera Neighbours, played by Blair McDonough. He made his first appearance during the episode broadcast on 13 December 2001. Stuart lived with Toadfish Rebecchi (Ryan Moloney) and Connor O'Neill (Patrick Harvey) at number 30, during which time the house became known as "The House of Trouser". Stuart's storylines included becoming a policeman, temporarily losing his eyesight, joining a cult, which almost cost him his friendships, and marrying Sindi Watts (Marisa Warrington). Stuart departed on 5 April 2006 after McDonough quit to pursue other projects. The actor reprised the role for three episodes from 13 February until 15 February 2018. Stu made an unannounced cameo appearance in the final episode on 28 July 2022.

== Casting ==
In 2001, McDonough became a runner-up in the first series of Australian Big Brother. His "good looks and down-to-earth personality" attracted the attention of the Neighbours' producers. McDonough had to audition for the role of Stuart. He was offered the part, which was initially for three months. McDonough began filming with the show in August 2001. Shortly before his debut episode aired, he had his three-month contract extended to six months. This was then extended to one year.

== Development ==
=== Characterisation and introduction ===
McDonough found that he was very similar to Stuart. He told Jason Herbison of Inside Soap, "There's a lot of him in me. He's a fairly straightforward guy, who's just out to have a good time." McDonough also said that he and his character were both from the country, but Stuart was more naive than he was.

Stuart, or "Chooka" as he is nicknamed, comes from Oakey, the home town of fellow Neighbours character Drew Kirk (Dan Paris). He is introduced as the younger brother of one of Drew's friends. He first appears at the Oakey Rodeo, where Drew is competing. A week later, Stuart follows Drew to Erinsborough, and McDonough said Stuart plans on "making a name for himself in the big smoke." Stuart immediately wins people over with his "country charm".

=== Departure and returns ===
McDonough quit the show in October 2005 after four years to move to the UK. A spokeswoman said "It was an enormous opportunity... and he's a bit sad leaving Ramsay Street because he's had a great time. But it's time to move on."

In January 2018, it was announced that McDonough had reprised his role. Executive producer Jason Herbison stated that Stuart will return to Erinsborough for a celebration which allows him to "reconnect with an old friend". Further details about the character's return were revealed on 17 January. Along with several other returning cast members, McDonough appeared in a feature-length special episode, which aired on 12 February 2018. The episode centres on a belated 21st birthday party for Toadfish Rebecchi (Ryan Moloney).

McDonough then made an unannounced return for the intended finale on 28 July 2022, in where Stuart sends a video message for Toadie after his wedding. Stuart added further nostalgia to the episode by referencing the "House of Trouser", the name that he and Toadie used to call Number 30.

== Storylines ==
Stuart turns up in Erinsborough and his friend, Drew Kirk allows him to stay with him and his wife Libby Kennedy (Kym Valentine). Stuart secures a job at Carpenter Mechanics. Stuart begins a relationship with Dee Bliss (Madeleine West) and she invites him to move into Number 30. Stuart's ex-fiancée, Tracey Slattery (Christine Wools) shows up in Ramsay Street and Stuart explains that she cheated on him on the eve of their wedding. Upon Tracey's departure, Stuart and Dee break up. Stuart then develops feelings for Felicity Scully (Holly Valance). Stuart joins the army, but he is not happy and decides to take a job as a hospital porter instead. Following Drew's death, Stuart promises Libby that he will be there for her and he quits his job at the hospital. Shortly after becoming a couple, Felicity tells Stuart that she is leaving for New York. Stuart proposes to her and she accepts. Once Felicity leaves, Stuart begins spending time with Libby and her son, Ben Kirk (Noah Sutherland). Stuart later admits that he made a mistake getting engaged and calls Felicity to tell her that their relationship is over. Stuart finds the garage hard to run by himself, and he employs Stephanie Scully (Carla Bonner). Stuart is accused of causing Dee's death when the car Toadie was driving on their wedding day is not deemed roadworthy.

Stuart meets Jonathan Verne (Oscar Redding) at a festival and he tells him about his group, Life Mechanics. Stuart joins the group and ignores his friends who say he is joining a cult. He begins spending more time with Jonathan and he starts running his own meetings. His friends turn against him. It soon emerges that Jonathan has been conning people out of money nationwide. Stuart retreats away from everyone for a while, before making amends. Stuart applies to be a police officer. On his first day, Stuart is partnered with Olivia McPherson (Silvia de Crespigny), they get on well and Stuart develops a crush on her. However, when he discovers she is corrupt, he reports her. Stuart fails to get on well with Toadie's new girlfriend, Sindi Watts (Marisa Warrington), but during an argument, they kiss. Sindi tells Toadie, and they stay together. When Toadie breaks up with her, Stuart and Sindi begin a secret relationship.

During a fire at the pub, Stuart tries to rescue Sindi, but the pub collapses and traps them. When they are rescued, Stuart is found to have severe injuries to his eyes. The Helen Daniels Trust donates money to Stuart so he can have an operation to fix his sight. Stuart grows suspicious about Sindi's behaviour when his friends begin to get injured. Liljana Bishop (Marcella Russo) slips off a ladder and Susan Kennedy hits her head on a cupboard door, while Sindi is around. Sindi tells Stuart that she is jinxed and goes through hypnotherapy treatment. Sindi proposes to Stuart, who accepts. Stuart grow suspicious of Sindi again when he learns that his friend, Trent Hoffa (Todd Scoullar) was hit by a car. After confronting Sindi, Stuart is forced to apologise when Trent wakes up and says the driver had dark hair and glasses. Sindi shows up at Stuart's bucks' night, but when Toadie claims to have seen her, Stuart does not believe him. On the day of the wedding, Toadie finds evidence that proves Sindi was there. However, he knocks himself out and Sindi takes the evidence. Upon waking, Toadie goes to the church and tries to stop the ceremony. Stuart punches him and he and Sindi marry. Toadie turns up during the honeymoon with the evidence about Sindi. Stuart witnesses Sindi pushing Toadie down some stairs and realises that Toadie was right. Sindi is taken to a psychiatric ward and Stuart vows to stand by her. Sindi asks for an annulment and tells him that she is transferring to another clinic. When Stuart's father hurts his back and is unable to work, Stuart argues with his brother, Ned Parker (Daniel O'Connor), about which one of them will return home to help out. Stuart puts his sergeant's exam on hold and calls Sindi to ask if she would join him in Oakey. She agrees and he departs Ramsay Street with Angie (Lesley Baker) and Kevin Rebecchi (Don Bridges).

Stuart returns to Erinsborough for Toadie's belated 21st party. He tells Toadie that Angie, Kev and his brother Stonefish Rebecchi (Anthony Engelman) are now coming to the party. Along with Lance Wilkinson (Andrew Bibby), Stuart, Stonie and Toadie dress as the Teletubbies for the party. Sindi repeatedly calls Stuart, but he ignores her and decides not to tell Toadie. Stuart makes a speech mentioning Toadie's romantic troubles with Sindi and con artist Andrea Somers (Madeleine West), causing Toadie to leave the party. Stuart follows him outside, and finds Sindi has come to tell Toadie that Andrea is back. Stuart catches up with Steph and tells her that his marriage to Sindi ended as she had a lot of issues to work through. Toadie apologises to Stuart for being busy with work, and they spend the afternoon together. After buying burgers from Grease Monkeys, Stuart notices the garage across the road and remarks that it has not changed. He notices the mechanic and Toadie introduces him as Ben (now Felix Mallard), Drew and Libby's son. Toadie persuades Ben to shut up the garage for the day and join him and Stuart at Number 30. Steph joins them in a game of truth or dare. Stuart tells Ben that he became a mechanic because of Drew and they all reminisce about him.

Four years later, Stuart sends Toadie a video message congratulating him on his marriage to Melanie Pearson (Lucinda Cowden).

== Reception ==
For his portrayal of Stuart, McDonough received a nomination for the Logie Award for Most Popular New Male Talent in 2002. He also earned a nomination for Sexiest Male at the 2003 Inside Soap Awards. Michael Idato of The Sydney Morning Herald praised McDonough's performance during his debut, writing "He is, in fact, a surprise: a perfectly adequate performer, considering he comes with no formal qualification in drama." Cameron Adams of the Herald Sun liked the character's change in career, writing "At least Stu (Blair McDonough) is getting a decent storyline – after the whole pitiful Life Mechanics thing. Stu wants to be a cop and he's going through the rigorous testing it takes to get his badge – a police officer's just what Ramsay St needs."

Nick Levine of media and entertainment website Digital Spy included McDonough in a picture feature of the "sexiest male soap stars from the last ten years." A writer for the BBC's Neighbours website said Stuart's most memorable moments were "helping Flick through her problems with Marc and Steph" and "being blamed by Toadie for Dee's death." After his brief 2022 return, Laura Denby from Radio Times stated that described Stuart as "fan-favourite back in his hey-day".
