= Sky Mangel =

Fictional character from the Australian soap opera Neighbours

- Neighbours character
- Stephanie McIntosh as Sky Mangel (2020)
- Portrayed by: Miranda Fryer (1989–1991); Stephanie McIntosh (2003–2024)
- Duration: 1989–1991, 2003–2007, 2015, 2020, 2022, 2024
- First appearance: 1 February 1989
- Last appearance: 4 July 2024
- Created by: Ray Kolle
- Introduced by: Don Battye (1989); Ric Pellizerri (2003); Jason Herbison (2015, 2020, 2022, 2024)
In-universe information
- Other names: Sky Bishop
- Occupation: High school student; Waitress; Cartoon writer; University student; DJ; Telemarketer; Senior detective
- Father: Eric Jensen
- Mother: Kerry Bishop
- Adoptive father: Joe Mangel
- Stepmother: Melanie Pearson
- Brothers: Toby Mangel (adoptive)
- Wife: Lana Crawford (2020–)
- Sons: Scotty
- Daughters: Kerry Mangel
- Grandfathers: Harold Bishop; Len Mangel
- Grandmothers: Mavis Bishop; Nell Mangel
- Uncles: David Bishop
- Aunts: Liljana Bishop
- First cousins: Serena Bishop; Jane Harris

Sky Mangel (also Bishop) is a fictional character from the Australian soap opera Neighbours. She made her first screen appearance during the episode broadcast on 1 February 1989. The character was originally played by Miranda Fryer until 1991. When Sky was reintroduced on 13 August 2003, Stephanie McIntosh took over the role. She departed on 3 August 2007. McIntosh reprised her role as part of the show's 30th anniversary celebrations on 20 March 2015. She returned for a longer stint as part of the 35th anniversary on 13 March 2020, and made an unannounced cameo appearance in the final episode on 28 July 2022, though her appearance was only broadcast in the Australian cut of the episode. McIntosh reprised the role again on 3 and 4 July 2024.

== Casting ==
Miranda Fryer was cast in the role of an infant Sky after being spotted in a supermarket. She was 18 months old when she began playing the role and was the first child actor to be contracted to the show. After leaving the serial in 1991, Fryer did not continue acting and was pursuing a career in nursing at the time of her death in 2022.

When the character was brought back in 2003, Stephanie McIntosh was cast in the role. Her casting was confirmed in March 2003 and she was offered a three-year contract. McIntosh told Heather Gallagher from The Age that she had completed a term of Year 12 when she was offered the part of Sky. She made the decision to leave school because the role was "just too good to refuse." McIntosh made her first appearance as Sky on 13 August 2003.

== Development ==
=== Characterisation ===
McIntosh described Sky as being "a lot of fun, intrigued about life and very positive." She said that her character likes to shock people, and they find it hard to see past her "tough exterior", but she is "quite a nice girl". She also called Sky "pretty out there", more than herself, but said she could not ask for a better character to portray. The actress also thought that a lot of viewers would be able to relate to Sky, who had endured the tragedy of her mother's death and bullying at school. McIntosh stated, "She's shown you can stand up for yourself and that's OK." For the role, McIntosh, who is a natural blonde, had to cut her hair short and dye it black and blue. The actress told Gallagher that she hated Sky's hair and it made things difficult for her in real-life, saying "A couple of times I walked into a shop and people watched me, waiting to see if I was going to steal anything." At McIntosh's suggestion, Sky's hairstyle later became long and blonde, which was also in keeping with the character's evolution.

One of Sky's early storyline whilst Fryer played her was the issue regarding who has parental rights over her. This occurs following the death of her mother, Kerry Bishop (Linda Hartley-Clark). In December 1990, a writer from TV Week revealed that writers would explore a custody battle between Sky's biological father, Eric Jensen (John Ley) and her step-father, Joe Mangel (Mark Little). The story played out during early 1991 Neighbours episodes. Eric wants to take Sky to live with him in New Zealand. The writer added that the storyline would be "heart-wrenching" as Joe faces losing Sky soon after Kerry's death.

=== Reintroduction ===
The character was reintroduced to the serial in 2003. A now teenage Sky returns to Erinsborough to visit her grandfather Harold Bishop (Ian Smith). McIntosh commented that Sky is now a "sophisticated young woman with an alternative streak." She explained that off-screen Sky's father and step-mother divorced when she was five, so she has struggled without a female influence in her life. After growing tired of living in the country, Sky comes to see her grandfather and find out more about her mother, who died when she was very young. Harold is "quite shocked" by her arrival and "outrageous appearance". He later thinks she is smoking marijuana when he smells incense coming from her room. He accuses Sky of taking drugs, which leads to a big argument between them. McIntosh stated that Sky just wants her grandfather's respect and she is hurt that he has judged her already.

=== Relationship with Boyd Hoyland ===
Producers soon established a relationship between Sky and fellow teen Boyd Hoyland (Kyal Marsh). Boyd is attracted to Sky, but her "fiery" personality and appearance leads him to keep his distance. Sky is seen as "the school freak" by some of the other students, and Boyd worries about his reputation if they date. Marsh explained that they have a great time together outside of school, but Sky is not mainstream and "rubs people up the wrong way", which could see him labelled uncool if they are seen together. Harold worries that Sky is being bullied and asks Principal Susan Kennedy (Jackie Woodburne) to keep an eye on her, which makes the situation worse, as Sky decides to "get up people's noses" and earns the nickname "Freak" from the other students. Marsh said that Boyd tries to avoid being seen in public with her, which Sky notices and is hurt, as she feels that Boyd is ashamed of her. Boyd later sides with some students over Sky, and she drags him into a shed to demand that he stands by her if he really is her friend. The students soon bang on the door and demand to know who is inside with Sky, which leads Boyd to kiss her in front of them. This incident prompts the pair to begin a relationship. Marsh thought Sky was a good match for his character, as Boyd is not very experienced with girls and he thought Sky would lead the way.

=== Friendship with Lana Crawford ===
"I was really taken aback when I heard about it, because I thought I knew my character back to front and then this was thrown at me! It was a bit of a shock, but I'm an actor and it's my job to take on challenging storylines!"

— McIntosh on her reaction to Sky and Lana's storyline. (2005)

In 2004, producers introduced the soap's first lesbian character Lana Crawford (Bridget Neval). Sky and Lana are initially hostile to one another and they get into a physical fight, which lands them both in detention. There, the characters bond over their mutual interest in art. Neval said, "it soon becomes harder for the two of them to maintain the façade of not liking each other, especially when they are so similar. Lana reveals her true self to Sky, and Sky begins to forget that she actually hates Lana. But neither of them admit it!" The pair begin a friendship after Sky draws a caricature of Lana and calls her "The Enigma". Neval admitted that Lana is "intrigued" by Sky, as she is the type of person she is attracted to.

McIntosh explained that Sky is initially oblivious to Lana's sexuality, so when Lana spontaneously kisses her, it comes as a shock and Sky does not know how to handle it. McIntosh also stated that when Lana tries to laugh it off, Sky is understanding and just worries that Lana is hurt. The kiss leads to the outing of Lana and the break up of Sky's relationship with Boyd. McIntosh told Inside Soap's Jason Herbison that Sky tells Boyd about the kiss, thinking that he has a right to know, but expects him to keep it quiet. However, he then tells Stingray Timmins (Ben Nicholas), who spreads the news around the school, leading to students calling Sky and Lana "lesbian lovers". Of Lana's reaction, McIntosh said "Lana accuses Sky of breaking her confidence, and runs off. Sky feels terrible because all this is due to her. She's angry with Boyd too, because she confided in him and he's let her down." Sky ends her relationship with Boyd, and tries to stop Lana from proving her heterosexuality by having sex with a boy from their class.

Neval attributed Sky's support and friendship to the reasons why Lana gains the confidence to come out. Following this, Sky is shown questioning her own sexuality as she works on a project with Lana. Neval told another Inside Soap columnist that Lana is unaware that Sky's attitude could be changing, but the viewers would get that sense. As the storyline progresses, Lana receives mixed signals from Sky, who is starting to wonder if her connection with Lana could also be physical. Neval said that Sky was going on a journey of her own, which her character thought she understood. When Lana informs Sky that her family are moving back to Canada, they carry out some late night "guerilla gardening" around Lassiters Hotel, which Neval thought was "a very Sky and Lana thing to do". As they enjoy the reaction to their efforts, Sky kisses Lana.

The second kiss between the characters attracted attention from the press, who named it the serial's first on-screen lesbian kiss. As it was shown during a G-rated timeslot, it provoked a strong reaction from radio callers and conservative groups, who accused Neighbours of "making homosexuality look cool". Peter Stokes, the chief executive of Christian group Salt Shakers, commented "It just saddens me that we give our young people the message that these relationships are OK". The show's executive producer Ric Pellizzeri's response was that Neighbours was reflecting reality by becoming more contemporary. He said, "We are not condoning or promoting homosexuality...ultimately, we're telling a story about tolerance". Pellizzeri also added that the kiss was as far as the show would go, but it would not be "dissuaded from telling stories about homosexuality". Neval added that the storyline was not sensationalist and she thought the writers had explored all the emotions involved, so viewers understood where the characters involved were coming from.

=== Departure and returns ===
On 24 December 2006, Fiona Byrne from the Herald Sun reported that McIntosh was to leave Neighbours. McIntosh told the show's producers that she wanted to move on when her contract expired in early 2007. She decided to leave the show to concentrate on her musical career. McIntosh commented that she was sad about leaving, but added "I kind of feel it's been a really great four years, but I'm ready for new challenges." She asked producers to give Sky a happy ending, instead of killing her off, saying "I think Sky's been through enough." McIntosh did not rule out a return to Neighbours. McIntosh's departure coincided with Marsh's (Boyd) own exit and their characters left together. Sky, her daughter and Boyd left Erinsborough for Port Douglas. Marsh commented "I think Boyd does have a lot of regret that things didn't work out on a romantic level between him and Sky. But in the end, there's a mutual understanding between them – and they'll always have that bond."

On 28 November 2014, it was announced that McIntosh had reprised her role for Neighbours' 30th anniversary celebrations in March 2015. Sky appeared on-screen via a Skype call on 20 March.

On 21 November 2019, David Knox of TV Tonight reported that McIntosh would reprise the role again, after she confirmed that she was in Melbourne, where Neighbours is filmed, on her Instagram account. McIntosh returns as part of the serial's 35th anniversary in March 2020. She expressed her delight at being asked to return to Neighbours for the milestone, and stated: "I can't wait for fans of the show to see what Sky has been up to and to have the opportunity to reconnect with her, as will I! It's all very special and the storyline is awesome, remaining true and authentic to who Sky has been and is!" Shortly after, it was confirmed that Bridget Neval was reprising her role as Lana Crawford, and that Sky and Lana were to be married in the show's second same-sex wedding. Daniel Kilkelly of Digital Spy reported that the couple reconnected off-screen. Sky returns to Erinsborough seeking Toadfish Rebecchi's (Ryan Moloney) help in telling her former partner Dylan Timmins of her news. Dylan also returns to Erinsborough hoping to reconcile with Sky, but he ultimately gives her and Lana his blessing.

The character continues to appear after the anniversary episodes, and it emerges that she is now a police detective. Sky leads the investigation into Finn Kelly's (Rob Mills) death and Elly Conway's (Jodi Anasta) involvement. Kilkelly reported that Sky is "under pressure" to make sure everything is done properly due to all the public attention. She urges Elly to cooperate and admit to murder, bringing Sky into conflict with fellow detective Mark Brennan (Scott McGregor). The storyline also sees Sky go up against Toadie, who decides to represent Elly. McIntosh's final appearance aired on 20 April 2020. McIntosh makes a cameo appearance as Sky in the show's finale, which aired on 28 July 2022. However, her appearance was cut from the UK broadcast by Channel 5. On 24 May 2024, it was announced that McIntosh had reprised the role of Sky. She will return to visit her grandfather, Harold, who recently moved back to Erinsborough. Sky returned in the episode broadcast on 3 July 2024. Her initial scenes see her inspecting Eirini Rising, the retirement complex Harold lives in. She also reconnects with her old friends.

== Storylines ==
=== 1989–1991 ===
When Sky is two years old, her mother Kerry takes her to Erinsborough to meet her grandfather, Harold Bishop. Kerry had been estranged from her father for a number of years. Harold is shocked to see Kerry and Sky, but is happy to have a granddaughter. He invites Kerry and Sky to move in with him and his wife Madge (Anne Charleston).

A few months after moving into Ramsay Street, Kerry marries Joe and Sky gains a brother, Toby (Finn Greentree-Keane; Ben Guerens), when Joe and Kerry officially adopt each other's children. During a picnic with Harold and Kerry, Sky is bitten by a Redback spider. She is rushed to hospital and recovers. A few months later, Madge is knocked unconscious while she is looking after Sky, and a chip pan catches fire. Sky and Madge are saved by the family's pet dog, Bouncer, who answers the telephone and barks for help. A pregnant Kerry is killed by a stray bullet while protesting against duck hunters. Sky is too young to know exactly what happened to her mother.

Shortly after Kerry's death, Sky's father Eric shows up wanting custody of Sky. Joe fights Eric for Sky, but the court awards custody to Eric. Joe takes Sky and Toby, but realises that he cannot live his life on the run and returns Sky to Eric. Eric later allows Sky to live with Joe. Sky gains a mother figure in the form of Joe's new wife, Melanie Pearson (Lucinda Cowden). Joe, Melanie and Sky move to the countryside. Joe and Melanie later divorce.

=== 2003–2007 ===
After Joe gets engaged to his pregnant girlfriend, Sky has difficulty coping with the new additions to the family. She decides to visit Harold. Harold initially mistakes Sky for a burglar, after she lets herself in through his back door. He barely recognises her as she is now a teenager. However, once Sky reveals her true identity, Harold invites her to stay. He grows concerned when he believes Sky has been smoking cannabis, but Sky assures him it was only incense. Sky is hurt that Harold suspects her of taking drugs. Harold introduces Sky to Boyd Hoyland and they become good friends. Sky has a hard time settling in at Erinsborough High School as her blue hair and dress sense make her stand out. Erin Perry (Talia Zucker) bullies Sky about her appearance. Erin and her friends later knock over a portable toilet that Sky is in at the school formal. Sky and Boyd's friendship causes embarrassment for him at school and he denies he is friends with her. Sky is hurt, but Boyd later kisses her in front of their peers. Sky and Boyd eventually lose their virginity to each other.

Sky's uncle David Bishop (Kevin Harrington), his wife Liljana Bishop (Marcella Russo) and their daughter Serena Bishop (Lara Sacher) move in with Sky and Harold, while their new house is being built. Sky tries to stop Serena sneaking out to a night club, but ends up going with her. Sky and Serena argue and Sky is followed by a guy who makes advances towards her. Sky runs home and is caught and grounded by Harold, while Serena watches. Sky comes face to face with John Swan (David Murray), the duck hunter who shot her mother. She follows him to the wetlands to confront him. David goes with her and she attacks John. John explains that he does not hunt anymore and returns to the wetlands to remember Kerry. Sky decides to change her image and reverts to her blonde hair. Sky fights with new student Lana Crawford and they are placed in detention together. Sky and Lana gradually get to know each other better and they become friends. During a sleepover, Lana, having read too much into Sky's friendly feelings for her, kisses Sky. Sky is shocked and Lana runs away. Lana later admits to Sky that she is a lesbian.

Sky and Lana create a cartoon strip together and sell it to an underground gay magazine. When Lana tells her she is leaving, Sky impulsively kisses her. Boyd finds out about the kiss and breaks up with Sky. They get back together with the help of Serena. Lana leaves for Canada, but stays in touch with Sky. Sky and Boyd's relationship breaks down when Sky finds out that Boyd kissed Serena. Sky then begins dating Dylan Timmins. Sky and Dylan work together to stop corporate giant Affirmacon from turning Erinsborough into a giant shopping mall. Sky joins Dylan, David, Liljana and Serena in a joy flight to celebrate twenty years of Lassiter's. While the plane is crossing the Bass Strait, a bomb goes off and the plane goes down. Sky and Dylan survive, but David, Liljana and Serena are killed. Sky attends art classes at Eden Hills University and is attracted to her teacher, Jean-Pierre Valasco (Steven Cabral). She has sex with him and when Dylan finds out, he ends their relationship.

A depressed Sky has a one-night stand with Stingray Timmins (Ben Nicholas). Shortly after, she discovers that she is pregnant. Sky realises that the baby could be Stingray's. Sky asks Dylan if they can get back together and he tells his girlfriend, Elle Robinson (Pippa Black), that he is thinking of reconciling with Sky. Elle then fakes an illness, so Dylan stays with her until he discovers the truth. Sky makes herself ill with worry about the baby's paternity. Dylan proposes to Sky and she accepts. She later faints and tells Dylan the truth about the baby, causing Dylan to end their engagement. Dylan then gets back together with Elle. While Sky is in hospital, she shares a room with Teresa Cammeniti (Hannah Greenwood), who plots to steal her baby. Sky gives birth to a daughter, who she names Kerry after her mother. Teresa sets fire to the hospital and while Sky is moved to another wing, Kerry goes missing. It soon emerges that Stingray took Kerry and passed out because he was drunk. Dylan finds them and he takes Kerry, but Elle returns her to Sky anonymously.

A DNA test later proves Dylan is Kerry's father. Sky begins a relationship with Stingray and when Kerry is diagnosed with leukaemia, Stingray donates his bone marrow to her. Sky has visions that Stingray is going to die and she organises a commitment ceremony for them. Stingray later dies from an aneurysm. Sky starts seeing spiritualist, Terrence Chesterton (Scott Johnson), but when she suspects he is scamming her, she tells him a fictional story about Stingray. Terrence responds as if it really happened and Sky confronts him. When he grabs her, she hits him over the head with a sugar dispenser. He falls unconscious and Sky runs off. Terrence's partner Charlotte Stone (Rachel Gordon) kills him, framing Sky. Sky is jailed for murder, but is freed after Boyd tricks Charlotte into confessing. Sky meets the recipient of Stingray's heart, Caleb Maloney (Nick Russell) and grows close to him. She decides to move to Port Douglas, so that Kerry can be closer to Dylan and Boyd decides to go with her. Harold later mentions that Sky is pregnant and she gives birth to a son, Scotty.

=== 2015–2022 ===
Years later, Sky, pregnant with her third child, contacts Harold via Skype to ask if he will move to Port Douglas to help her out with her children and provide support. After Sky mentions Madge came to her in a dream, Harold agrees to give up his nomadic lifestyle for her.

Sky returns to Erinsborough five years later to take part in the Lassiters Wedding Expo. She asks her cousin Jane Harris (Annie Jones) to keep her engagement a secret, as she tries to meet with Toadie Rebecchi. Jane accidentally tells Shane Rebecchi (Nicholas Coghlan) and Dipi Rebecchi (Sharon Johal) that Sky is marrying Lana Crawford, whom she reconnected with six months ago. Sky admits that she has not told Dylan and wanted Toadie's help, but as he is away, Shane offers his help instead. Dylan arrives and hopes to reconcile with Sky, but she finally tells him about Lana. When Sky and Lana's wedding venue is destroyed, Sky wants to cancel the wedding, but Terese Willis (Rebekah Elmaloglou) arranges for them to marry at The 82, a former tram turned restaurant. Dylan gives them his blessing and Sky and Lana are married by Jack Callahan (Andrew Morley). Now a senior police detective, Sky remains in Erinsborough to investigate the death of Finn Kelly (Rob Mills), insisting upon the arrest of Elly Conway (Jodi Anasta) for his murder. Sky reveals to Mark Brennan (Scott McGregor) that her own false imprisonment previously caused her to believe in the innocence of a guilty woman, leaving her determined not to discount the evidence against Elly. Sky also investigates a break in at Number 28.

After speaking with the OPP, Sky tells Elly that she is being offered a plea deal, whereby she pleads guilty to downgraded charges of voluntary manslaughter and receives a suspended sentence, which Elly accepts. Sky leads a police raid on an apartment where Mannix Foster (Sam Webb) has been living, but only succeeds in scaring Harlow Robinson (Jemma Donovan) and Mackenzie Hargreaves (Georgie Stone). As they are questioned, Sky goes to track Mannix's phone. At Elly's hearing Judge Joseph Vagg (Rick Burchall) gives her a three-year custodial sentence. Sky apologises to Elly for how things have turned out, but she is confident an appeal will lead to a suspended sentence. Elly asks Sky's advice about taking her young daughter Aster Conway (Isla Goulas) inside with her. Sky tells her that it is her decision, but not to let Aster out of her sight. Before leaving, Sky asks Toadie to keep an eye on Finn's mother Claudia Watkins (Kate Raison), who she suspects had a hand in the custodial sentence. Sky's theory is later proven correct when it emerges Claudia blackmailed the judge, as part of her bid to get custody of Aster. Two years later, Sky appears in a video message congratulating Toadie and Melanie Pearson on their wedding. Two years after that, Skye visits Harold after he moves back to Erinsborough. She attempts to convince him to move back to Port Douglas so she can care for him, but he turns down her offer and opts to stay in Erinsborough. Skye returns home alone.

== Reception ==
For her portrayal of Sky, McIntosh received a nomination for the Logie Award for Most Popular New Female Talent at the 2004 ceremony. The following year, Boyd and Sky were nominated for Best Couple at the Inside Soap Awards. In 2006, she received the Fave Female Hottie award at the Nickelodeon Australian Kids' Choice Awards.

Upon Sky's 2003 return, Robin Oliver from The Sydney Morning Herald quipped "Watching Neighbours since way back? You may recall Sky, the cheeky young daughter of the greenie martyr Kerry Bishop (who was killed during a duck hunt). Sky is now a rebellious teen (Stephanie McIntosh) and drops in on her grandfather, Harold (Ian Smith), and Lou (Tom Oliver)." Larissa Dubecki from The Age praised McIntoshs performance, and said "I also love that her alter ego Sky accessorises her 1980s-wear with miscellaneous bits of material, wears coloured hair extensions in her knotty blonde locks and is a bit of a proto-feminist in the Erinsborough High yard, the kind of forthright suburban bogan with a heart of gold who is destined to break the heart of new bad boy Dylan." Dubecki thought Sky was the "perfect antidote" to Delta Goodrem and added that "the fabulous Sky" would probably get to the bottom of Paul's latest plot.

A columnist for Inside Soap enjoyed the scenes in which Sky and Libby joined forces, writing "Gutsy girls are rare in Neighbours – most of Ramsay Street's female residents are too wrapped up in their love lives to make a stand for anything serious. So I'm glad to see two girls with gumption – Libby Kennedy and Sky Mangel – buddying up." The columnist also thought Sky's mother would be proud of her.

A BBC Online writer stated that Sky's most notable moment was "Coming face to face with John Swan – the man who killed her mother." Describing Sky, a writer for media company Virgin Media said "As Harold's eccentric granddaughter, Sky Mangel spent her time on Ramsay Street dating Boyd Hoyland, becoming an artist and having a baby with Stingray Timmins. Phew." In a separate feature, Sky's 2003 return to the show was placed at number Ten on Virgin's "Soap Comebacks" list. In 2007, readers from the Herald Sun placed Lana and Sky's kiss at number nine on the list of Neighbours Top Ten moments. A reporter said "It's rare that Neighbours attracts the attention of the shock jocks around the country, but that's what happened when Sky Bishop, played by Stephanie McIntosh, gave Lana, played by Bridge Neval, a kiss. Sky was exploring her sexuality and the scene was one of the most talked about ever in the press. Lana left Erinsborough and Sky has gone on to be an unmarried mum".

In 2010, to celebrate the 25th anniversary of Neighbours, a reporter for Sky profiled 25 characters of which they believed were the most memorable in the show's history. Sky was included on the list and the reporter commented "Sky was a classic soap child who left for a few years and came back far more attractive. It's little wonder that she became the focus of a teen brigade including Dylan, Stingray, Boyd and Serena, not to mention that brief lesbian period with Lana. With her beloved Grandpa Harold on hand to dispense advice when she variously lost her family, got pregnant, and lost the father of her baby, Stingray, she brought sunny confidence to her regular visits to the funeral home". To celebrate Neighbours' 6000th episode in August 2010, TV Week put together a list of the top 25 Neighbours characters. Sky was included in the list and a writer for the magazine commented "With a teenage pregnancy, a penchant for activism and a same-sex affair, Sky was never boring".

A Herald Sun reporter included Sky's 2015 return in their "Neighbours' 30 most memorable moments" feature. Following her brief 2022 return, Laura Denby from Radio Times praised Sky's return, saying "With Sky's dad Joe (Mark Little) making a second cameo too, it wouldn't have felt right without a few words from Sky – and it was great to see McIntosh in her memorable role one last time".
