= Serena Bishop =

- Neighbours character
- Portrayed by: Lara Sacher
- Duration: 2003–2005
- First appearance: 9 October 2003
- Last appearance: 26 October 2005
- Introduced by: Ric Pellizzeri
In-universe information
- Occupation: Student; Waitress; Bounce shop assistant and co-owner
- Father: David Bishop
- Mother: Liljana Bishop
- Half-brothers: Luka Dokich
- Grandfathers: Harold Bishop; Miroslav Ristic
- Grandmothers: Mavis Bishop; Svetlanka Ristic
- First cousins: Sky Mangel
- Other relatives: Kerry Mangel

Serena Bishop is a fictional character from the Australian soap opera Neighbours, played by Lara Sacher. She made her first appearance during the episode broadcast on 9 October 2003. Serena's storylines included kissing her cousin's boyfriend, being taken advantage of by a photographer and starting an incestuous relationship with her half-brother. Shortly after the character's on-screen parents were written out, it was announced in May 2005 that Sacher would also be leaving. Serena made her last appearance on 26 October 2005.

== Casting ==
Sacher was 16 years old and still at school when she secured the role of Serena. The role marked her first professional acting job, and first major television role, following appearances in television commercials and a guest role in children's series Noah and Saskia. Sacher had doubts that she would win the part after learning from her agent that "hundreds of girls" were going for it, but they felt the audition would be good experience for her. She stated: "I just went in there and had fun with it and then I got it. It was a big shock." Sacher was at school when her mother called her to let her know that she had been offered the role. She admitted that it was "a bit of a fairytale story" as Neighbours had been her favourite show growing up. Serena was the final member of the Bishop family to be auditioned. Sacher was delighted with the chemistry she shared with Kevin Harrington and Marcella Russo, who play her on-screen parents David and Liljana Bishop respectively. She made her first appearance as Serena in early October 2003.

== Development ==
Serena was billed as "David Bishop's spoilt daughter". Sacher explained that her character comes from a "fairly wealthy" background, which causes her to come across as "quite snobish", however, Sacher said she is also "a lot of fun, really outgoing and adventurous." She also described her as being "spontaneous and bubbly" and thought she was great. Serena goes from being a snob to becoming someone more likeable throughout her time in the show. Originally Serena's tendency to act like a spoilt snob annoyed some viewers, who labelled the character as "mean". Describing Serena's journey and people's perception of her, Sacher stated: "Towards the middle and the end, she started growing up and she had some life changing experiences that really made her mature, and then people just started relating to her and really understanding her, and I think because she began as a snobby person they really appreciated her more so as she was growing up."

In an early storyline, Serena becomes "besotted" with older student Taj Coppin (Jaime Robbie Reyne) and sneaks into a nightclub with her cousin Sky Mangel (Stephanie McIntosh) in order to catch his attention. Sacher said her character is "absolutely infatuated with Taj but he thinks she's too young. She's so outgoing and spontaneous that she convinces Sky to go to the nightclub where Taj will be." The night does not pan out the way Serena hopes, as both girls are scared off by the presence of an undercover police officer. Sacher explained that they run away quickly, but Serena is not put off her pursuit of Taj and gets him to drive her home. Sacher thought that Serena feels she is being quite grown up, but Taj is just not interested in her romantically. Sacher continued: "I think she likes the fact that he's older. She's at an age where boys have suddenly become very interesting to her." Meanwhile, having split up from Serena, Sky has a "terrifying experience" when she is followed by a stranger as she makes her way home.

In May 2005, it was announced that Sacher would be departing the show in an "extremely dramatic" storyline in October of that year. The news came a few weeks after her on-screen parents were axed as part of a cast shakeup. Script producer, Luke Devenish said "All three Bishops will be leaving together ... in one of our most startling storylines for the year". He added "The door will be left open for their return, however, despite the spectacular circumstances. Serena's final scenes will be nothing short of heartbreaking – but very memorable!" In 2007 Sacher revealed there were no plans to introduce her and Serena back into the serial.

Sacher has stated that Serena's exit from the serial seemed premature. Serena had just started growing up, Sacher felt it was a shame she did not get to play the rest of her journey out. However she was happy with her dramatic exit in the plane crash. Of the filming of Serena's exit, Sacher had to film in a swimming pool fitting with dark lighting and a wave machine. She felt that from an actor's viewpoint it was good to "get her teeth into" the drama filled scenes.

== Storylines ==
Serena arrives in Erinsborough with her parents David and Liljana, when they arrive to stay with her grandfather Harold Bishop (Ian Smith) and her cousin Sky Mangel (Stephanie McIntosh) at Number 24 Ramsay Street. Serena, expecting to stay no more than several weeks until the family's new home is built, is upset when she learns that they will have to remain living in Ramsay Street after David is ripped off by his business partner Thomas Morgan, leaving the family bankrupt. She is further displeased when she learns she will have to leave Eden Hills Grammar and attend Erinsborough High along with Sky, but this subsides when Serena becomes popular and tries to distance herself from her cousin.

After sneaking into a nightclub and lying about her age, Serena meets barman Chris Cousens (Simon Mallory) who offers her his card and tells her he is a photographer. Serena agrees to model for a session and earns $200. At the school formal, Serena flirts with Taj Coppin (Jaime Robbie Reyne) but he tries to put her off by pretending to come on heavy with her. Later in the evening when Sky is attacked by Erin Perry (Talia Zucker) and her friends, which results in a portable toilet being tipped over, Serena stands by and does nothing to help. Sky is very cold with her and the truth about Serena's modelling is revealed to Liljana who then slaps Chris.

Chris' seedy dealings are exposed when Serena discovers a webcam in his studio, which is followed by David breaking into Chris' studio to retrieve his computer and later burns the photos of Serena. Stingray Timmins (Ben Nicholas) arrives and is immediately attracted to Serena and tries to impress her by doing silly stunts. Serena softens towards him after being initially resistant. However, Serena has difficulty accepting Stingray's hyperactive streak and is uncomfortable to be seen in public with him at times. David and Liljana disapprove and Stingray turns to Gino Esposito (Shane McNamara) for help in style and etiquette to impress Serena, which backfires when he eats too much during a date and is sick all over her. Serena and Stingray's relationship later ends after his wild behaviour becomes too much to handle.

Serena later meets Luka Dokich (Keelan O'Heir) and becomes immediately attracted to him, much to the horror of her grandmother Svetlanka Ristic (Deidre Rubenstein), who knows the truth about Luka's true parentage. After Luka donates part of his liver to save Liljana, it soon emerges that he is her son and Serena's half-brother. After planning the school formal with Boyd Hoyland (Kyal Marsh), Sky's boyfriend, who has separated from her, Serena shares a kiss with him and they begin a brief relationship.

As 2005 begins, Serena finds her parents at odds after Liljana has an affair with Paul Robinson (Stefan Dennis) and briefly leaves the family. Liljana later breaks up with Paul and returns. After this Serena takes a job working for Toadfish Rebecchi (Ryan Moloney) in his bikini shop Bounce, which she later buys into and becomes attracted to Connor O'Neill (Patrick Harvey). Things are messy as Connor is much older and has a daughter, but the couple begin dating until it emerges that Connor has been stealing from the shop to pay back a $50,000 loan to his ex-girlfriend Carmella Cammenitti (Natalie Blair) which was used to pay for an operation for Connor's daughter, Madeleine Lee.

The Bishop family, along with several of their neighbours board a joy flight to Tasmania arranged by Paul for the 20th anniversary of Lassiter's. A bomb explodes taking out one of the engines and the plane crashes into Bass Strait. Serena and Connor find themselves clinging to floating wreckage in a desperate fight for their lives. Connor tries to keep a weakened Serena awake, but is unable to and she vanishes into the rough seas. Serena's body was never found.

== Reception ==
A writer for the BBC's Neighbours website said one of Serena's most notable moments was "Persuading Sky to sneak to a nightclub and then letting her take the blame". Katie Baillie of the Metro included Serena in her list of the "11 of the worst Neighbours characters". Of the character, Baillie stated "She was so annoying that she and her whole family were wiped out in a plane crash. Karma's a bitch in Erinsborough. She was a 'spoilt brat', once stood by as her cousin was pushed over while inside a portaloo (so gross) and got it on with her half brother Luka. So annoying." In 2015, a Herald Sun reporter included Serena's death in their "Neighbours' 30 most memorable moments" feature.
