= Lucy De Ville =

Australian band from Melbourne

- Origin: Melbourne, Victoria, Australia
- Genre: Acoustic pop
- Years active: fl. 2004-2006
- Past members: Shaun Gardener; Marcella Russo; Marisa Warrington

Lucy De Ville were an Australian acoustic pop band. Their line-up consisted of Shaun Gardener, Marcella Russo and Marisa Warrington, all of whom had acted in the television soap opera Neighbours. They issued a self-titled album in 2006.

== History ==
Lucy De Ville were formed as an acoustic pop group in Melbourne by Shaun Gardener on guitar and vocals and Marcella Russo on lead vocals who were neighbours. They had performed together as members of an earlier band Swallow. After that group broke up they began working together and formed Lucy De Ville as a duo. Their first release, Looking for a Sign appeared in 2004. Soon after Marisa Warrington joined on co-lead vocals creating the trio version.

Gardener was also a member of the cover band 21-20 since early 1990s. He had fronted the house band for TV sports and variety show, Live and Kicking (1998–1999) and had been a regular on infotainment programme Good Morning Australia (early 2000s). Gardener has written music with fellow 21-20 member Tim Rosewarne (ex-Big Pig, Chocolate Starfish). Russo performed as Liljana Bishop in Neighbours (2003–2005). She is an Adelaide performer who moved to Melbourne in 1995, working in both states in television, theatre, film and radio and fronting bands. She played the character of Magenta in a one-off benefit production of The Rocky Horror Show at the Regent Theatre in November 2004 featuring Neighbours cast members. It raised money for Variety Club Australia and the Taralye School for Deaf Children. Warrington portrayed Sindi Watts in Neighbours (2002, 2003, 2004–2005). She had trained in the UK with the Royal Shakespeare Company and returned to Australia to perform with the Australian Shakespeare Company and the Melbourne Theatre Company. She has many television credits. A classical singer, Warrington also studied at the Victoria Ballet School and appeared as Columbia in the charity performance of The Rocky Horror Show alongside Russo.

Lucy De Ville's debut performance was on 23 June 2005 at a benefit concert by various artists, Neighbours Rock 4 AIDS. They issued their debut, self-titled studio album in January 2006.

== Discography ==
- Lucy De Ville (January 2006)

1. Love Story
2. Running Back to You
3. Diamonds
4. Beautiful
5. Who's Gonna Tell Her?
6. Bury Me In Your Arms
7. Trawling For You
8. Better Than Nothing
9. Daybreak
10. Skylight
11. I'm Nothing

- Looking for a Sign (2004)

1. Looking for a Sign
2. Looking for a Sign (LFO Remix)
3. Running Back to You
4. Pillow Talk
5. Looking for a Sign (Acoustic)
