= Connor O'Neill =

- Neighbours character
- Portrayed by: Patrick Harvey
- Duration: 2002–2006, 2012
- First appearance: 19 April 2002
- Last appearance: 27 November 2012
- Introduced by: Stanley Walsh (2002); Richard Jasek (2012)
In-universe information
- Occupation: Labourer (2002–2003); Lou's Place barman and manager (2003–2005); Chauffeur (2005); Bounce Shop assistant (2005–2006); Private Investigator (2006)
- Daughters: Madeleine Lee

Connor O'Neill is a fictional character from the Australian soap opera Neighbours, played by Patrick Harvey. He made his first screen appearance during the episode on 19 April 2002. Harvey was still in school when he won the role of Connor. He initially auditioned using an Australian accent, but later re-read for the part in his natural Northern Irish accent. The producers decided this would suit the role of Connor better. The character became well known for his friendship with Toadfish Rebecchi (Ryan Moloney) and his relationships with Michelle Scully (Kate Keltie), Carmella Cammeniti (Natalie Blair) and Serena Bishop (Lara Sacher). One storyline saw Connor have a one-night stand with Lori Lee (Michelle Ang), which resulted in the birth of their daughter, Madeleine (Madison Lu). Harvey decided to move on from Neighbours, so he could pursue other roles and Connor departed on 30 May 2006. In August 2012, it was announced Harvey had reprised his role for a four-week guest stint and Connor returned on 30 October. He departed on 27 November 2012.

== Casting ==
Harvey was still in school when he secured the role. He had always wanted to act and hired an agent while he was living in Australia. It was then that the part in Neighbours "came along". When Harvey auditioned for the role of Connor, he did so with an Australian accent. He came back and re-read the part again in his Northern Irish accent and he was given the role. Casting director Jan Russ told a reporter from the BBC that Harvey did the best Australian accent she had ever heard, but she and the producers decided to give the character Harvey's natural accent.

== Development ==
=== Characterisation ===
Connor was introduced to Neighbours as a friend of Jack Scully (Jay Bunyan). He was a backpacker from the United Kingdom who came to live with Jack's family. Connor was illiterate and on his arrival in Australia, he accidentally took Malcolm Kennedy's (Benjamin McNair) luggage. An Inside Soap writer called Connor an "enigmatic stranger". Connor befriended the show's other teenagers and he helped Nina Tucker (Delta Goodrem) overcome her shyness when it came to singing. Producers later decided to introduce Connor into the shared home at Number 30 with Toadfish Rebecchi (Ryan Moloney) and Stuart Parker (Blair McDonough), deeming it the "House of Trouser". The trio played out the serial's comedy stories and Harvey told Jason Herbison from Inside Soap that "the directors duck when they see us coming, we're forever coming up with our own ideas and adding little things in." A writer for the BBC's Neighbours website described Connor as "a splendid and thoughtful young man". A Channel 5 website reporter branded Connor a "lovable larrikin", while adding that he was "famed for a rather unique sense of style." In November 2012, Harvey told an Inside Soap writer that there would be no chance of Connor finding his "inner adult" anytime soon. He added "He's still a bit of a larrikin – nothing's changed there. But Connor's given some tough love while on Ramsay Street – and that could end up being a 'light bulb' moment for him..."

=== Relationships ===
==== Michelle Scully ====
Connor arrives in Australia on working visa which permits him to only work for the same employer for three months. He starts a relationship with Michelle Scully (Kate Keltie) and works for her father Joe Scully (Shane Connor). They later realise that the conditions of his visa have been broken as he carried on working for Joe outside the time limit. Keltie told Herbison that Michelle "panics" when immigration contact the Scully household. Upon receiving legal advice, Connor is told that deportation is likely. Michelle tells Connor "We've got to get out of here" and the pair go on the run where she comes up with a plan to marry Connor. Keltie explained that "it would be a solution to their problem, and even though neither of them are really ready for it, she's prepared to do it for Connor." He does not like the idea because he is scared of Joe's reaction. He does decide to see a priest and plays with the idea. The actress branded their actions as "completely ridiculous and irrational" because they are only sixteen. Keltie would have felt differently "if they really loved each other, but they haven't been together long enough to know." Michelle later left Connor to go to New York.

In March 2004, Connor became caught in the middle of a "passion-fuelled" love triangle when Carmella Cammeniti (Natalie Blair) and Michelle returned to Erinsborough. Connor is surprised when Carmella reappears, especially as she was sent away by her "scary underworld-figure" father, Rocco (Robert Forza). He tries to resist her advances, but he succumbs and they head to the bedroom. Harvey said "When Carmella comes back from Italy, Connor thinks 'Ok, let's see what happens. I really do like you'. They disappear into his room and come out a bit later. They're just having a bit of fun – they're enjoying a kiss and cuddle. But then Connor looks up and sees Michelle standing in the hallway." Connor was unaware that Michelle was on her way home and the moment is awkward. Michelle assumed that she and Connor would pick up where they left off, so she cannot believe what she is seeing. Harvey admitted that Connor was "shattered" when Michelle left him to go to New York and that she may have been the only person he has ever really loved. When she wrote and told him she was seeing an American boy, he thought things were over between them for good. Harvey explained "That's when he thought he should move on. He turned to Lori and then Nina and later Carmella. I think Connor really loves Carmella's personality. He likes the way she thinks and gets on with life, and there's definitely an attraction there." Although Connor reassures Carmella that his relationship is in the past, it becomes obvious that he is torn.

==== Lori Lee ====
Connor forms a close friendship Lori Lee (Michelle Ang) and they have a one-night stand. Harvey opined that it was a "rebound thing" because there was no attraction between them. Connor is "really missing" Michelle and Lori is heartbroken over Jack Scully (Jay Bunyan) and the scenario develops from there. Lori is a "shoulder to cry on" and it feels right for them both at the time, but the next morning they regret it. The situation becomes awkward because "Connor thinks that Lori might want a relationship, and Lori thinks the same of him, even though that's not the case." Lori discovers she is pregnant and Connor is led to believe that she has had an abortion before she leaves Erinsborough. Connor later reunites with Michelle, who returns home from New York to visit her family. They decide to spend a romantic night at Lassiter's Hotel and Michelle gives Connor a makeover. She then dares him to walk into the hotel lobby and Connor runs into Lori, who introduces him to his daughter, Madeleine (Madison Lu). Of the situation, Harvey told TV Week's Jackie Brygel "Connor is standing there looking like an idiot. Lori says 'Here's your daughter!' He just can't believe it. Everything feels like it's crashing down around him. It's a massive shock." Ang stated that Lori was not imagining introducing Connor to Maddy like that, but she is caught off guard in the lobby. Lori is unaware that Connor and Michelle are back together and Ang thought Lori might not have brought Maddy into Connor's life if she knew. Lori is keen to make sure her daughter knows who her father is and she wants to give Connor the chance to be a father.

==== Carmella Cammeniti ====
Connor and Carmella's relationship is tested when Frank Romano (Lliam Amor) begins to stalk Carmella. To begin with they are unaware that Frank is the perpetrator and they attempt to figure it out. Connor thinks that Dylan Timmins (Damien Bodie) is responsible – but he and spots the actual stalker and attempts to catch Frank. It soon becomes apparent that he came to the house to set up an accident. Blair stated that "the step is covered in something slippery, and Connor falls and knocks himself unconscious, which is when they realise they must take these threats seriously." The storyline comes to the forefront of the show when Frank wants Connor removed from the scenario. He kidnaps Connor and then decides to make his move on Carmella. Blair told a correspondent from Inside Soap that Carmella realises that Connor is in danger when "Frank comes on to her and tells her to forget about Connor". Carmella is "terrified" for Connor and thinks "her only chance to save" him is to play along with Frank's games. Connor remains unconscious and tied up inside a derelict building, which David Bishop (Kevin Harrington) plans to demolish. Carmella's attempts at tricking Frank fail and "he tells her to forget Connor, as he's taken care of him". Blair added that it "sounds like Connor is dead". Stuart manages to save Carmella, but he refuses to reveal where Connor is. A crowd gather outside the building that Connor is located in and begin a demolition countdown. The actress explained "since nobody knows Connor is inside, there doesn't seem much chance of him escaping at all."

After Connor is rescued Carmella decides to leave Erinsborough to overcome her ordeal. Connor begins a relationship with Serena Bishop (Lara Sacher); this shocks Carmella when she returns with the hope of a reconciliation. Blair told Inside Soap's writer that her character left Connor to have some time to herself but did promise Connor that she would return. Carmella decides to "surprise" Connor with her return, unaware that Serena is now on the scene. Connor is "shocked" to see Carmella, who presumes they are back together; Carmella is not impressed when Connor tells her the truth about Serena. This formed a new "tricky love triangle" for the characters. Blair explained that "Serena's a kid, but Carmella sees herself as a sophisticated woman. In her mind, Connor will choose her over a schoolgirl." Connor remains loyal to Serena but Carmella manages to get the "upper hand" when Maddy is taken ill. Lori asks Connor for fifty thousand dollars to pay for Maddy's ear operation. Connor asks Carmella for a loan and she agrees "on the condition that he spends time with her until he repays the loan. It's blackmail basically."

The story arc culminates with both Connor and Carmella resorting to lies and deception. Connor fakes a robbery at Bounce to repay Carmella, who is a concocting a new scheme. Harvey told a writer from Inside Soap that Carmella pretends that she loaned the money from a member of the local mafia. She "makes up this elaborate story so it looks as though she's really stuck her neck out for Connor. It's all part of her new plan to steal him away [from Serena]." When Stuart investigates the robbery, Carmella realises that Connor is the perpetrator and returns the money to Bounce. However, the act makes "Connor is completely confused" and left looking "even more suspicious" to the police. Izzy Hoyland (Natalie Bassingthwaighte) convinces Carmella to maintain her lies and deceive Connor further. Carmella asks Connor to accompany her to a meeting with the mafia, but tells him to wait outside as they do not exist. Harvey explained that "Connor's really worried [about Carmella], and insists on confronting the bad guys himself"; and in doing so he exposes Carmella's plot.

=== Departure ===
In January 2006, it was announced that Harvey had decided to leave Neighbours. He filmed his final scenes in February, and his exit scenes aired in May 2006. He told Jackie Brygel of TV Week that he knew it was time to move on from the series, saying "You have to get out into the big bad world and see if you can make a go of it. Acting is still my priority." When asked if there was a chance he could return to the soap in the future, Harvey replied "Who knows? Never say never!"

=== Return ===
In July 2012, the executive producer of Neighbours, Richard Jasek, was asked about an upcoming "mystery male returnee" during an interview with Digital Spy's Daniel Kilkelly. Jasek commented "I can't say too much at the moment, but Neighbours does have a rich history of wonderful past characters and yes, we do have a familiar face visiting – all will be revealed shortly…" On 17 August 2012, it was confirmed that Harvey had reprised his role and he would be seen on-screen from October. The actor was initially contracted for a four-week guest stint. Harvey began filming his scenes in the same week and he stated "As soon as the wardrobe department pulled out the boxers and Hawaiian shirt, I was back in character. However, it wasn't until Ryan dropped his dacks in a scene that I knew I was home!"

Connor's exit storyline in 2006 saw him disappear in mysterious circumstances, so Toadie is "over the moon" to see his friend alive and well. Harvey revealed that Connor turns up at Toadie's house in the middle of Sonya Mitchell's (Eve Morey) baby shower, which does not please her. He continued "But Toadie is delighted that Connor is back. Things are very grown-up in his life now, and this is a sort of release for him." Harvey explained further that Connor manages to cause an argument during the baby shower, which causes Sonya to ask Toadie to "send him packing".

== Storylines ==
Connor meets Jack, who tells him that he can stay with his parents if he ever visits Australia. Connor later shares a flight to the country with Malcolm Kennedy. He accidentally takes Malcolm's bag, which is identical to his own, instantly making the Erinsborough residents suspicious of him. Connor arrives at the Scully's house in Ramsay Street, explaining about Jack and he is asked to stay by Joe and Lyn Scully (Janet Andrewartha). Joe also gives Connor a job as a labourer at his business OzeBuilt. When Tad Reeves' (Jonathon Dutton) passport goes missing, Toadfish Rebecchi believes Connor has taken it. To prove his innocence, Connor reveals to Tad that he is illiterate. Connor develops a close friendship with Michelle Scully and they eventually begin dating. They tell Joe, who allows the relationship to continue, but with some ground rules. Connor's illiteracy continues to cause him problems and he is later blackmailed by Tahnee Coppin (Anna Jennings-Edquist). Unable to read the labels, Connor mixes up a bottle of floor cleaner for lemonade. He gives Michelle a cocktail and it burns her throat. She is taken to the hospital in time and Connor reveals his illiteracy. Michelle forgives him, but Connor feels guilty and leaves. He later returns and Michelle gets Libby Kennedy (Kym Valentine) to tutor Connor.

Nina Tucker moves to Erinsborough and befriend Connor and Michelle. Connor discovers that she is a good singer and encourages her to reveal her secret by appointing himself her manager. He later enters her song "Born to Try" in a contest and her secret comes out. Tahnee learns Nina has a crush on Connor and tells Michelle. Jack returns and Connor moves into the garage to give the family some room. Connor realises Jack and Nina have been having an affair and is horrified that they could betray their partners; Lori Lee and Taj Coppin (Jaime Robbie Reyne). Connor's role at OzeBuilt causes jealousy among the other workers and one of them reports him to immigration. Connor and Michelle flee Ramsay Street and Michelle proposes. They realise they cannot get married in Australia due to Michelle's age, so they make plans to go to New Zealand. Michelle's sister, Stephanie (Carla Bonner), finds the couple to give them their passports and she tries talking them into returning. Connor calls Joe and tells him to come to the airport, he then books himself on a flight to London. Joe arrives and asks Connor to stop running away, so he returns and explains his illiteracy to the immigration officials. They accept why Connor broke the rule and allow him to stay. Lyn and Joe tell Connor that he is not welcome in their home anymore, so he goes to stay with a friend. His relationship with Michelle ends and she leaves for New York.

Connor moves into Number 30 with Toadie and Stuart. He becomes closer to Lori and they set up a business selling T-shirts. Connor and Lori have a one-night stand and Lori later informs him that she is pregnant. Connor agrees to support her, but Lori reveals that she is going to have an abortion. Connor takes her to the clinic and Lori then leaves to spend time with her family. Max Hoyland (Stephen Lovatt) employs Connor as a barman at Lou's Place. Nina uses Connor when she wants to get back at Jack. They kiss and Connor falls for her, but Jack blackmails him by threatening to reveal all about Lori and the pregnancy. Connor tells Nina the truth and they grow closer, but she leaves suddenly for Bombay. Connor then falls for his co-worker Carmella, but her father sends her away to Italy when he discovers their relationship. Carmella later returns and she and Connor rekindle their relationship, just as Michelle arrives back from New York. Connor reveals that Michelle is the only girl he wants and they get back together. While they are spending the night at Lassiter's Hotel, Connor and Michelle run into Lori who is checking in. She then tells Connor that she did not got through with the abortion and introduces him to his daughter, Madeleine. Michelle leaves for New York again and Connor starts bonding with Madeleine, before Lori returns to Lorne.

Carmella manipulates Connor into being her limousine driver and they get back together. Connor fails to get along with Lori's partner Nick Sullivan (Angus Grant), and when he learns Lori is moving to Adelaide, he worries that he will not see his daughter. Connor takes Madeleine and refuses to hand her back until Lori listens to him. Lori changes her mind about moving, breaks up with Nick and gives Connor more access to Madeleine. Carmella's mother offers Connor the role of junior editor of her magazine and Connor admits that he still has illiteracy problems. Carmella helps him improve his skills. Carmella realises she has a stalker and Connor learns it is her driver Frank, when he is kidnapped. Frank ties Connor up in a building due for demolition. Connor manages to free himself moments before the building is demolished and Frank is arrested. Carmella leaves stating that she needs some time to herself. After Toadie is left a bikini shop called Bounce by a client, he and Connor become business partners. Toadie employs Serena and she and Connor develop feelings for each another. Lori contacts Connor and reveals Madeleine needs surgery for an ear infection. Connor struggles to raise the money and Carmella gives it to him. She later asks for it back, saying it was from her father's mob contacts, and Connor robs Bounce. Carmella apologises for lying and anonymously returns the money. Serena finds out and breaks up with Connor.

Connor joins Serena and several neighbours on a joy flight to Tasmania. The plane crashes into the Bass Strait and Connor washes up on a beach with Dylan. Believing themselves to be the only survivors, they agree to play dead and start new lives. Harold Bishop (Ian Smith) finds Connor on the streets and persuades him to return. Connor trains as a private investigator and his first job is to find Carmella. He eventually tracks her down to a local convent, where she reveals that she is happy being a nun. Connor then decides to go travelling. Just before his departure, Carmella calls him to say that a coma patient she visited at a hospice, looks like Paul Robinson's (Stefan Dennis) son, Cameron (Adam Hunter). Connor realises Cameron has a twin, who was believed missing, and he tells him where his brother is. However, Cameron turns out to be Robert Robinson (Adam Hunter) and he grabs Connor and forces him to stay in his house. Robert later leaves the street alone in Connor's ute. Toadie worries about his friend's fate, but the Australian Embassy in China call him and explain that they have found Connor's wallet. A few months later, Connor sends his friends a package from China, containing some gifts for Saint Patrick's Day.

Six years later, Connor returns to Ramsay Street to see Toadie. However, he interrupts Sonya Mitchell's (Eve Morey) baby shower and she asks him to stay out of the way. Toadie eventually returns home and he and Connor catch up. Connor tells Toadie that he cannot believe everyone thought Robert had killed him and reveals that he just went travelling. Toadie explains to Connor that he cannot stay with them, so he gets him a room at Number 26 with Kyle Canning (Chris Milligan) and Rhys Lawson (Ben Barber). Connor and Kyle get on well and go out drinking, but Rhys cannot stand him. Sonya invites Connor to stay with Toadie, while she goes away for a week. When Connor makes some comments about Vanessa Villante (Alin Sumarwata), Rhys punches him. Connor, Toadie and Kyle reinvent the House of Trouser when Sonya goes away for while. On Sonya's return, Connor realises that it may be time to leave. He and Toadie go out for a beer and Toadie learns that Lori is getting married. Connor explains that he is not going to the wedding, even though Maddie wants him to. He states that he has nothing to show for the last six years and Toadie tells him to get his life together. Connor believes that Toadie has not married Sonya because he does not want to let go of his old self and stay stuck in Erinsborough forever. Connor later apologises for his comments and decides to go to Lorne for Lori's wedding. On his return, he reveals that he is going to get a house near Lori, so he can spend more time with Maddie. Sonya asks Connor if he can organise a bucks party for Toadie and he organises an inflatable boxing ring to be delivered to Ramsay Street. Connor glues a pair of boxing gloves to Toadie's hands, before leaving for Lorne.

== Reception ==
For his portrayal of Connor, Harvey won "Most Popular New Male Talent" at the 2003 Logie Awards. A BBC website writer said Connor's most notable moments were "When it was revealed that he couldn't read. Finding out Lori was pregnant. Meeting his daughter Maddy for the first time." Speaking of Harvey and Connor, a writer for Virgin Media said that they thought the character did not have any serious storylines. They stated "Patrick found fame as Toadie's best friend, and Irish funny-man Connor O'Neill. But with storylines like being illiterate and being threatened with deportation, is it any wonder he didn't last long?" Beverley Johanson of The Age stated Harvey "stirs many a teenage heart as Connor". A columnist from Inside Soap said that when Connor moved into the Scully household, he got an "added bonus" in the form of Michelle; adding that their "dangerous liaison" was "Ramsay Street's hottest secret" until Joe found out.
