= David Bishop =

David Bishop may refer to:

- David Bishop (writer) (born 1966), New Zealand novelist, playwright and comics writer
- David Bishop (runner) (born 1987), British Scottish international middle-distance athlete
- David Bishop (gymnast) (born 1990), New Zealand artistic gymnast
- Dave Bishop (referee) (born 1948), New Zealand rugby union referee
- David Bishop (rugby, born 1960), Welsh international rugby player during the 1980s
- David Bishop (rugby union, born 1983), Welsh rugby union player
- David Bishop (Neighbours), fictional character in Australian TV series Neighbours
- David Bishop (British politician) (1944–2022), leader of the Church of the Militant Elvis Party
- David Bishop (Canadian politician) (1942–2017), Canadian politician and member of the Legislative Assembly of New Brunswick
- David Bishop (American politician) (1929–2020), American lawyer, politician and member of the Minnesota House of Representatives
