= David Bishop (Neighbours) =

- Neighbours character
- Portrayed by: Kevin Harrington
- Duration: 1988, 2003–2005
- First appearance: 11 May 1988
- Last appearance: 25 October 2005
- Introduced by: Don Battye (1988); Ric Pellizzeri (2003)
- Book appearances: Summer Harvest
- Spin-off appearances: Neighbours vs Zombies (2014)
In-universe information
- Occupation: Accountant; Legal assistant Councillor
- Father: Harold Bishop
- Mother: Mavis Bishop
- Sisters: Kerry Bishop
- Wife: Liljana Ristic (until 2005)
- Daughters: Serena Bishop
- Stepsons: Luka Dokich
- Grandfathers: Frank Bishop
- Nieces: Sky Mangel

David Bishop is a fictional character from the Australian soap opera Neighbours, played by Kevin Harrington. He made his first screen appearance during the episode broadcast on 11 May 1988, arriving for his father Harold's (Ian Smith) wedding to Madge Ramsay (Anne Charleston). David, along with his wife Lilijana (Marcella Russo) and daughter Serena (Lara Sacher), returned in October 2003. In May 2005, it was announced that the family had been axed and David departed on 25 October 2005.

== Development ==
=== First stint ===
Harrington made his first appearance as David in 1988. He was introduced as the son of established regular Harold Bishop (Ian Smith), and comes to Erinsborough for his father's wedding to Madge Bishop (Anne Charleston). After the wedding, David stays in town and begins "chasing after" Jane Harris (Annie Jones). Of his brief, first stint with the serial, Harrington called David "mini-Harold" because of how much he looked like his on-screen father, adding "originally when I played him, I even had glasses like Harold's." Jason Herbison of Inside Soap observed that there was no sign of the character during Harold's notable storylines, including the time he was missing and presumed dead, when he returned with amnesia, and when Madge died from cancer. Harrington joked that even he was unsure what happened with David during those years. He said, "God knows what happened during that period where Harold disappeared and came back from grave! I assume Harold just phoned David all those years ago to say 'you thought I was dead, but I'm not'. David's been in Perth this whole time, and Perth is a long way away from Ramsay Street, so perhaps the simple answer is that he just couldn't afford the air fare!"

=== Reintroduction ===
On 15 May 2003, Kylie Miller from The Age reported that Harrington would be returning to Neighbours after a 15-year absence, and that he would start filming in the coming weeks. Miller later reported that Harrington's return scenes would air in October 2003. Harrington explained to Herbison that he had expressed an interest in returning to the serial in the past, but only for guest roles which the producers were not keen on. When he was asked to return again in 2003, Harrington accepted the offer, as it coincided with his wanting to stay in Melbourne, where the show is filmed, on a permanent basis. He signed a three-year contract, and stated "This (Neighbours) job came at exactly the right time for me: regular work, week in week out, and I get to be at home with the family."

On-screen, David moves to Erinsborough with his wife Liljana Bishop (Marcella Russo) and their teenage daughter Serena Bishop (Lara Sacher) to set up a financial advice business. They move in with Harold while their house is being prepared. Harrington described David as being "gullible and accident-prone", while his daughter "wraps him around her little finger". He admitted that he had fun playing David, but was still getting used to learning his lines every day. The Advertiser's Eleanor Sprawson noted the physical similarity between Harrington and Smith, with Harrington joking that he had been working on "the double chin" so he could return to the serial again. Sprawson thought that Harrington was having fun with the role after he does an impersonation of Harold in his early scenes, and that David was finally allowed to be himself.

David and Harold's relationship is initially awkward, as they have some issues to overcome. Harrington told Herbison that David resents that Harold has spent more time with other children over the years, than he did with him. Meanwhile, Harold is unimpressed with David's "flashy new lifestyle" and think he places too much emphasis on money. Liljana attempts to play "peacemaker" between the two, as she can see they are both stubborn which affects how they communicate with each other. Herbison thought David was still "an awkward young version of Harold", and Harrington admitted that his initial challenge was deciding whether to play the character as he appeared in 1988, or assume that he had changed over the years. He added, "Out of loyalty to the people who remembered him, I established him as being very similar to what he was like years ago. He started out like a little Harold back then, before some pretty drastic things happened to change him." Harrington hoped that once he had established David as a character again, he could "make him his own person." Sprawson noted that David becomes "a sort of anti-Harold" with his business dealings and behaviour.

A few weeks after their arrival, David admits to his wife and daughter that they are in financial trouble. Russo explained that Liljana has no idea there is anything wrong, as she has accepted David's explanations for anything that she felt was amiss. She assumes that they have money in the bank and their new house is being built. Liljana and Serena attempt to surprise David at his business, but find the office shut up and for lease. David has actually been working as a legal assistant to Toadfish Rebecchi (Ryan Moloney), so when he gets home Liljana confronts him. Russo continued, "David reveals that there is no business – his partner did a runner – and they have lost everything." The news has implications for the whole family, as they cannot afford to buy a house and Serena has to leave her private school. Russo felt that if David had been honest, Liljana would have been supportive.

=== Departure ===
In May 2005, it was announced that Harrington, Russo and Marisa Warrington (Sindi Watts) had been written out in favour of new cast members. All three were expected to leave as their contracts expired. A few weeks later, it was announced that Sacher would also be departing as part of an "extremely dramatic storyline" involving the Bishop family in October of that year. Script producer, Luke Devenish said "All three Bishops will be leaving together ... in one of our most startling storylines for the year. Lil and David have been at the very forefront of stories this year – caught up in wicked Paul's web – and their departure ties into this. The door will be left open for their return, however, despite the spectacular circumstances."

== Storylines ==
=== 1988 ===
David is the eldest child of Harold and Mavis Bishop. David is every bit his father in terms of stature and principles. David attends his father Harold's (Ian Smith) buck's party, much to the amusement of Henry Ramsay (Craig McLachlan), Scott (Jason Donovan) and Paul Robinson, due to his resemblance to Harold and similar traits. David attends the wedding and acts as best man. He does not initially take to his father's fiancée Madge Ramsay (Anne Charleston), but welcomes her by calling her "mother" at the reception. David then makes a speech that bores the guests and is ultimately halted by Jim Robinson (Alan Dale). The morning after the wedding, David puts Henry's nose out of joint when he wakes him at 7 am to clear up at Number 24.

During this brief visit to Erinsborough, David tries to woo Jane Harris (Annie Jones), the granddaughter of Harold's former landlady, Mrs Mangel (Vivean Gray), and goes as far as to tell her boyfriend, Mike Young (Guy Pearce) that he is out to win Jane. Jane tells David she is not interested and only wants to be friends. David annoys Henry further by insulting Madge, which results in Henry threatening him with violence. However, they make up after David reveals Mrs Mangel had said some nasty things about Madge, which also influenced his attitude toward her. Henry gives David a "cool-dude" image makeover, which does not sit well with Harold, and sets David up with Prue Watkins (Lindsay Worthington) who works at Lassiter's Hotel. After the date, Prue ultimately rejects David and tells him she does not want to see him again. David then returns home to Adelaide.

In the intervening years, David moves to Perth and marries Liljana Ristic. They have a daughter, Serena. In 1991, Madge contacts David to tell him about Harold's disappearance, after he is washed off some rocks and presumed drowned. David flies down to be with her. Five years later, Harold is discovered to be alive, but suffering from amnesia. He regains his memory, but his relationship with David suffers.

=== 2003–2005 ===
15 years later, David phones Harold with the news that he and his family are moving to Erinsborough after he lands a job with an old school friend, Thomas Morgan. The family initially stay with Harold until their new home is built but problems are visible as David and Harold's relationship has been strained over the years after Harold's disappearance and battle with amnesia, resulting in minimal contact between father and son besides the odd Christmas and birthday card.

After Harold visits David at his workplace and is virtually ignored, Harold lets his feelings be known towards him, citing David as materialistic. Harold then complains about Liljana taking over his kitchen and Serena being spoilt. David hits back by telling Harold he has felt excluded from his life and points out that he only called him to tell him Madge had died, after her funeral two years prior. David, Liljana and Serena move into Lassiters' for several days. Liljana helps repair the rift between David and Harold and the family move back in.

David receives a shock when he finds his new offices locked and bolted. He tries to contact Thomas but his calls go unanswered. David keeps the news of his financial problems to himself and consults Tim Collins (Ben Anderson) for legal advice. Tim's colleague, Toadfish Rebecchi (Ryan Moloney) tells him Thomas has ripped David off and has disappeared with the money. When David's BMW is repossessed, he is forced to come clean to Liljana about being bankrupt. Liljana is shocked and appalled by the lies. David and Liljana both get jobs with Toadie and Karl Kennedy (Alan Fletcher), respectively. David is offered some work in Sydney but it means being away over Christmas, However he is able to work ahead of schedule and come home on Christmas Eve, much to the family's delight. The Bishop's Christmas is marred by Harold suffering a stroke on Boxing day at Lou Carpenter (Tom Oliver) and Trixie Tucker's (Wendy Stapleton) wedding reception.

Liljana's mother, Svetlanka (Deidre Rubenstein) arrives. David and Liljana are quick to cover up their money problems but are forced to admit them. The visit coincides with the revelation Serena has been dating and posing in racy bikini shots for pedophilic photographer Chris Cousens (Simon Mallory). David breaks into Chris' studio, smashes the place up, steals Chris' hardrive and hands it in to the police anonymously then later burns the photos. Svetlanka blames Liljana and David for being unable to control their daughter and offers to take Serena back to Perth with her. Liljana refuses and Svetlanka tells David the only reason Liljana married him is because she needed a father for her child. David is stunned and thinks Serena is not his daughter at first until Liljana tells him that she had been pregnant when she met and had given birth to a stillborn son, fathered by a worker at her mother's vineyard. Svetlanka is then banished from Number 24 after David stands by his wife.

David supports his niece, Sky Mangel (Stephanie McIntosh) when she goes to confront John Swan, the man who shot her mother, David's sister, Kerry (Linda Hartley-Clark) in 1990. Sky attacks John but is restrained by David. John tells them he regrets his actions and only comes to the wetlands to reflect on what happened. David and Liljana's marriage goes through a testing time when both accuse each other of having affairs. When the anniversary of his mother, Mavis' death approaches David invites Sky to join him, Liljana and Serena in celebrating Mavis' life with a champagne picnic and some birdwatching. David then tells Harold that he always felt he never loved Mavis as much as he did Madge. Harold assures David that he loved Mavis very much. David is resistant when Serena begins dating the hyperactive Stingray Timmins (Ben Nicholas) but eventually accepts it.

Liljana falls ill due to liver failure and none of the family are a suitable match. David is distraught when he faces the possibility of his wife's death. Svetlanka's godson, Luka Dokich (Keelan O'Hehir), who had been dating Serena, offers to help the family. Liljana recovers and it is soon revealed that Luka is her son. Svetlanka had paid a doctor to tell her that he was stillborn and had him adopted him out. Luka eventually leaves after setting fire to David's briefcase. David runs for councillor and Paul, who has recently returned to the area pledges his support. Paul later causes the family more problems when he frames David for defrauding The Helen Daniels Trust after working on the accounts for the company. David is eventually cleared but the damage to the marriage is done after Liljana begins to think he really is guilty.

David is devastated when he finds that Paul and Liljana have been having an affair. He tries to run Paul down with his car one afternoon at Lassiter's. After Paul is hospitalised after a bad business deal, which results in the loss of a leg, David, working as a salvation army volunteer, encounters him in the hospital and is goaded by Paul with the chance to get him out of the Bishops' life forever. David then lets go of the Wheelchair leaving Paul to hurtle towards a busy freeway. Paul jumps to safety at the last minute deciding he wants to live. David and Liljana reconcile, but when Paul moves next door to the Bishops, he taunts them at every opportunity. The couple rise above it, but not before David and Harold begin practising the tuba at early hours. When David wins $250,000 on the lottery, he toys with the idea of spending the money on expensive things, but donates it to the Salvation Army which initially shocks Liljana.

To celebrate Lassiter's 20th anniversary. The Bishops, along with Sky and several of their neighbours, go on a joyflight to Tasmania. The flights ends in tragedy when a planted bomb explodes, causing the plane to crash in the Bass Strait. A few days later, David's body is found, but Liljana and Serena's are not. David is identified by Sky and her adoptive father, Joe Mangel (Mark Little). A memorial service is held at the community hall and David is buried with only Harold and Sky present.

== Reception ==
Eleanor Sprawson of The Advertiser praised the casting of Harrington as Smith's on-screen son, stating "It's when the chins wobble in unison as the two reach to shake hands that the connoisseur of Aussie soap realises this isn't just a casting coup: it's casting genius." A writer for the BBC's Neighbours website stated that David's most notable moment was "Getting himself into financial trouble and keeping it a secret." Brian Courtis from The Age branded David "Harold's hapless offspring". A writer for Ausculture placed David eighth on their Top Ten Aussie Soap Villains list. They said that David deserved a mention for a number of reasons, including being the father of "snotty child Serena". But they explained that David is on the list for "his heartless attempt to ensure Lou gets bum-raped in the prison showers. When a man is desperate enough to ask for money to pay off his jail's stand over men, it is NOT the time to take a moral stand on bullying." In 2015, a Herald Sun reporter included David's death in their "Neighbours' 30 most memorable moments" feature.
