= Sindi Watts =

- Neighbours character
- Portrayed by: Marisa Warrington
- Duration: 2002–2005, 2017–2018
- First appearance: 19 July 2002
- Last appearance: 2 August 2018
- Introduced by: Stanley Walsh (2002); Ric Pellizeri (2003); Jason Herbison (2017)
In-universe information
- Occupation: Travel agency worker; Legal secretary; Television presenter; Exotic dancer; Astrologer; Magazine columnist; Barmaid; Temporary manager of The Flametree Retreat
- Sisters: Penny Watts
- Husband: Stuart Parker (2005–; divorced)
- First cousins: Lana Crawford

Sindi Watts (also Parker) is a fictional character from the Australian soap opera Neighbours, played by Marisa Warrington. She made her first appearance during the episode broadcast on 19 July 2002. Sindi was initially a recurring character, before she was promoted to the regular cast. Her storylines often focused on her romantic relationships, including her affair with Rocco Cammeniti (Robert Forza) and marriage to Stuart Parker (Blair McDonough). She also attempted to break up Toadfish Rebecchi (Ryan Moloney) and Dee Bliss (Madeleine West), and briefly became a lapdancer to raise much needed money.

The character was written out in May 2005 and she departed on 26 August 2005. In January 2017, it was announced that Warrington had reprised her role, and Sindi returned on 7 February, where she was revealed to be involved in a scam with Andrea Somers (West). The following year saw the character make a brief appearance on 12 February 2018, before returning for a longer guest stint from 26 June to 2 August 2018.

== Development ==
=== Casting and characterisation ===
The character of Sindi marked the third time Warrington had appeared in Neighbours since 1996. After her first stint in 2002, Warrington returned for another guest stint the following year, as Sindi became Toadfish Rebecchi's (Ryan Moloney) receptionist. In September 2003, reporters for the Herald Sun confirmed that Warrington had joined the main cast for 2004. Warrington had previously appeared in stage productions and a handful of television guest roles, so she was hesitant about signing a three-year contract. She stated "I'm more at home on stage than anywhere else. Signing for three years was a huge decision for me. It seemed such a huge commitment, plus the fact I'd done so little TV."

Warrington described her character as "one-part stalker, one-part lunatic." Warrington told the BBC that she enjoyed playing the "evil" Sindi that tried to break up Toadie and Dee Bliss (Madeleine West). But she later admitted that she initially found her character annoying, stating "She rubbed people up the wrong way, and I didn't like her!" The writers changed Sindi's persona for her 2003 reintroduction. She became a lot nicer and more fun. Warrington said that Sindi was also more "dippy", adding "the current Sindi character is incredibly sweet and honest, she has a lot of good points." She later told the Herald Sun's Robert Fidgeon that every time she returned as Sindi, she had "undergone something of a personality transplant". She branded Sindi "a real nasty-pasty" during her first stint, before she became "a ditsy blonde", and then "a fabulous legal secretary". Of her 2004 return, Warrington said Sindi was now the "bubbly host of a home renovation show."

=== Relationships ===
Jack Scully (Jay Bunyan) becomes interested in Sindi and he goes to Toadie for advice on how to win her over. However, Toadie is resentful of Jack, as he likes Sindi too. Toadie struggles to admit to himself that he has feelings for Sindi because he is in mourning for his late wife, Dee. Warrington explained the situation, "This is the point at which Toadie starts to become interested in Sindi, but just because he's not ready to reveal his feelings, he doesn't want anyone else to go after her either. There's a nice little love triangle that develops." Sindi and Toadie begin a brief relationship, but they break up because Toadie still loves Dee.

Sindi leaves town for a while, but when she returns she tells Lyn Scully (Janet Andrewartha) that she is in a relationship with a married man. She explains that she has been trying to stop it, but she has trouble going through with it. Lyn disapproves, but she supports Sindi. When Sindi's feelings for Toadie resurface, she decides to end her relationship with the man she calls "Tiny." It is then revealed that Sindi is having an affair with criminal Rocco Cammeniti (Robert Forza). Warrington admitted that Sindi's friends would be shocked to learn who she is dating. Toadie realises that he cares deeply for Sindi and she tries again to break off her relationship with Rocco. However, she is left stunned when Rocco tells her that he has left his wife and gives her an engagement ring. Warrington said, "Sindi can't admit to Rocco that she's in love with someone else, and she's also worried that something will happen to Toadie if she tells Rocco who she is in love with. So she uses the excuse that she doesn't want to be Rocco's secret 'other woman' anymore." However, Rocco then chooses that moment to give Sindi an engagement ring, which she has to accept. She later tells Toadie that she loves him and they agree to start their relationship again. Sindi finally manages to end her relationship with Rocco to start a new life with Toadie, but she is unaware that Rocco has hired someone to spy on her. Rocco is not happy when he is given photos of Sindi and Toadie together, and Warrington commented that he "goes a bit crazy" as he believes Sindi is his girl. When she was asked what it was like to date someone like Rocco, who is nearly twice her age, Warrington replied "Robert, who plays Rocco is a lovely guy, so it was fine. However, I must confess, when I was about 24 I briefly dated a man who was in his 40s and I have to say that it did look a bit wrong! He looked like my uncle!"

When her boyfriend, Stuart Parker (Blair McDonough), is left blind following a fire, Sindi turns to exotic dancing to raise money. Warrington explained that Sindi feel responsible for Stuart's condition because he went into the fire to rescue her. She also likes that he is now dependent on her, as she is a needy person and she loves him. Sindi has no choice but to return to her previous profession, as other career prospects are non-existent, but she keeps it a secret. Of this, Warrington told Inside Soap's Jason Herbison: "Sindi goes back to exotic dancing – something she always swore she would never do again. She hates it and is so ashamed that she doesn't tell anyone. But that's the kind of character Sindi is. She's a doormat!" At the end of a shift, Sindi is offered the chance to make more money by prostituting herself. Warrington said that although Sindi says no, she is tempted by the money. The character's resolve is tested when Stuart starts seeing colours and a specialist informs him that surgery would cost $50,000. Sindi knows how they can get the money and seriously considers turning to prostitution. Warrington said that Sindi wants to be with Stuart forever, so she knows that she would be doing it for their future.

Stuart and Sindi became engaged in 2005 and they begin planning for their wedding. However, Toadie becomes suspicious that something is wrong with Sindi and that she "may not be all she's cracked up to be." He confronts her at the wedding ceremony, but Stuart punches him and he and Sindi marry.

=== Departure ===
In May 2005, it was announced that Warrington's character would be written out of the show in a "surprise shake-up" of the cast. Actors Kevin Harrington (David Bishop) and Marcella Russo (Liljana Bishop) were also told their contracts were not being renewed, as producers sought actors to form a new family for the show. Warrington had 18 months left on her contract and expressed her disappointment at leaving the show, after she worked on making her character "more appealing" to conservative viewers.

=== Returns ===
"Sindi appears to be a changed woman now, but a leopard never really changes its spots. It's not very long before she gets up to her old tricks and is slap-bang in the middle of causing big trouble for Toadie."

— Madeleine West on Sindi's return.

On 24 January 2017, Daniel Kilkelly of Digital Spy announced that Warrington had reprised her role and would be returning to Neighbours for a guest stint from 7 February. Sindi's return was part of a storyline surrounding the reappearance of Dee Bliss. After arriving in Erinsborough, Sindi tells Toadie that she heard the news about Dee being alive, so she had to come and see for herself. Toadie's wife Sonya Rebecchi (Eve Morey) is suspicious of Sindi, and Morey stated "Sonya finds it all a bit strange – first there was Dee, now Sindi! Why have they both turned up now? Also Dee makes out that the two of them are friends, but from what Toadie has told Sonya, Dee and Sindi were definitely not mates!"

The woman claiming to be Dee is revealed to be a con artist named Andrea Somers (West), and it soon emerges that Sindi is her accomplice. Scenes between the two characters explained that Sindi met Andrea when they worked at a catering kitchen together and she told her that she looked like Dee Bliss. They then came up with a plan to claim money from the Bliss family estate, with Sindi asking for $20,000 in exchange for her help. Sindi later poses as Dee's saviour Emily on the phone to the police, leading her to increase her share of the money to $40,000.

Warrington reprised the role again, along with several other returning cast members, for a feature-length special episode, which first aired on 12 February 2018. The episode centres on a belated 21st birthday party for Toadie. As Toadie leaves his party, he is surprised to meet a "bitter" Sindi, who reveals that Andrea is back in Australia. She then gives Toadie a phone number for Andrea. Sindi returned for a guest stint from 26 June, until 2 August 2018.

== Storylines ==
=== 2002–2005 ===
Sindi meets Darcy Tyler (Mark Raffety) at Lassiter's and there is an attraction between them. Darcy later treats Sindi's hurt ankle, but does not pursue anything further as he is dating her sister Penny (Andrea McEwan). Sindi seizes the opportunity to blackmail Darcy by threatening to tell Penny about his flirting with her unless he gives into her demands which include paying for clothes and shoes. Penny sees the pair together one day and as revenge reports Darcy to the medical board for having an affair with a patient. Sindi soon leaves Erinsborough. The following year, Sindi crosses paths with Darcy again and is used as a pawn in his game to drive a wedge between Toadfish Rebecchi and Dee Bliss, in order for Darcy to win Dee back. Sindi goes through with the plan by flirting with Toadie, but ends up falling for him for real. Darcy is annoyed, but Sindi threatens to expose his dubious dealings. When Sindi leaves an earring behind and goes to retrieve it from Toadie's house, she meets Dee, who assumes Sindi has moved in. Sindi tries to explain, but Dee leaves before she can.

Several months later, Sindi returns when Tim Collins (Ben Anderson), Toadie's colleague, hires her to work at their legal practice. Things are awkward at first, but Sindi settles in the job and she and Toadie remain amicable. As the amount of time they spend together increases, Sindi reveals she still loves Toadie, but he is not over Dee who drowned several months previously in a car crash on their wedding day. Sindi leaves once again.

Sindi returns as the director, producer and host of Making Mansions, a home make over show. She chooses the Scully family's house as the venue to be redesigned. Things do not work out as Sindi manages to insult her crew, prompting them to walk out on her. Luckily, several friends and neighbours help her and the work is eventually completed. Sindi becomes a resident herself of Ramsay Street when she lodges with Susan Kennedy (Jackie Woodburne). Toadie and Sindi begin a relationship, but not without obstacles including the revelation of Sindi's previous affair with Rocco Cammeniti and his refusal to let her go, which results in Toadie being kidnapped and ending up in a brief coma. Sindi is a strong support for Toadie when he briefly takes on guardianship of his cousin Stingray Timmins (Ben Nicholas), before Stingray moves in with Sindi and Susan. However, Toadie still struggles with the idea of commitment so soon after Dee's death, and during a low patch Sindi shares an unexpected kiss with Toadie's friend and housemate Stuart Parker (Blair McDonough). She confesses all to Toadie after he asks her to move into Number 30, and their relationship soon ends.

Sindi and Stuart are caught up in a bank raid and held hostage by gunmen. Although the situation is resolved peacefully, the trauma brings Sindi and Stuart together and they begin seeing each other in secret. The Lassiters complex is set on fire by Paul Robinson (Stefan Dennis), and Sindi becomes trapped inside Lou's Place. Stuart runs in to save her, but he too becomes trapped and passes out due to smoke inhalation. After the building collapses entirely, the firefighters are about to give up looking for them in the wreckage, until Sindi manages to call Toadie. She and Stuart are rescued, but Stuart is left blind. Toadie realises that Sindi is in love with Stuart, and reluctantly gives his blessing to the relationship. Sindi discovers that an operation to restore Stuart's sight will cost $50,000, and in desperation tries to raise the money by selling her body. Her only client, Gary Evans (Ian Scott) gives her the money after he loses a coin toss. Stuart refuses to accept the money after realising how it was obtained, and Sindi instead donates it to Harold Bishop (Ian Smith) for the Salvation Army. A guilty Paul later offers to pay for the operation from his charity, the Helen Daniels Trust fund, although neither Sindi or Stuart are aware of his involvement in the fire.

Sindi and Stuart are happy in their relationship for a while, before a run of odd events start happening around them. Sindi loses her job at All Her Magazine and she is later snubbed at a school reunion by her old classmates. Several of their friends and neighbours suffer mysterious accidents, including Susan, Liljana Bishop (Marcella Russo), and Janae Timmins (Eliza Taylor) - coincidentally all after upsetting Sindi in some way. Trent Hoffa, a colleague competing with Stuart for a promotion, is also run over by a mystery driver. In the meantime Sindi proposes to Stuart, and the two have a whirlwind engagement. Toadie links the numerous accidents with Sindi's increasingly bizarre behaviour, and worried for Stuart's safety, tries to halt the wedding ceremony. Stuart punches Toadie, and the wedding goes ahead, but Stuart realises the truth when he later sees an unhinged Sindi push Toadie down a flight of stairs.

Hospitalised, it emerges that Sindi has been suffering from paranoid delusions, and had received treatment in her teens after pushing schoolmate Kelly Weaver (Simone Ray) down some stairs, leaving her paralysed. A broken Sindi asks Stuart for an annulment, with her doctors advising that her obsession for a perfect married life was a trigger. Stuart refuses the annulment but agrees to a temporary break while she recovers, and she is transferred to a clinic in New South Wales. Almost a year later, Sindi agrees to join Stuart for a new start in Oakey as he leaves Ramsay Street.

=== 2017–2018 ===
Sindi and Stuart later divorce. While working in a kitchen, she meets Andrea Somers (also Madeleine West), and they concoct a plan where Andrea poses as her lookalike, the presumed dead Dee Bliss, to scam Toadie. She eventually returns to Erinsborough and tells Andrea she regrets her part in the scam, but demands her share of the money to be increased. Weeks later, Sindi returns to the news that Andrea has conned Toadie out of $100,000 and fled to London. Susan Kennedy (Jackie Woodburne) reads Sindi's texts and discovers Andrea's true identity. A panicked Sindi then leaves town.

Nearly a year later, Sindi returns to Erinsborough to give Toadie Andrea's phone number. Months later, Sindi brings Andrea's infant son Hugo Somers (John Turner) to Ramsay Street, and breaks the news that Toadie is Hugo's father. Gary Canning (Damien Richardson) gives Sindi a job at The Flametree Retreat. While returning to the retreat to make sure she locked up, Sindi is confronted by Jeremy Sluggett (Tamblyn Lord), who demands her keys so he can retrieve a bag of money from a drawer. Sindi manages to contact the police, and Jeremy knocks her unconscious as he escapes. While Amy is visiting Sindi, she tells her about a job offer as a sales manager in Sydney. Sindi is reluctant to accept as she wants to makes amends to Sonya and Toadie, but Sonya gives Sindi her blessing. Sindi comes to Ramsay Street to say her goodbyes and Toadie asks if she ever told Andrea about his first kiss with Dee, but Sindi tells him that she did not mention it.

== Reception ==
When Sindi's cousin, Lana Crawford (Bridget Neval), came out to her, a Sydney Star Observer reporter called Sindi "sympathetic" and said her nice reaction to Lana's news was "good to see." A writer for the BBC's Neighbours website said Sindi's most notable moments were "Dating Toadie for money. Acting like a bogan to put Rocco off. The Making Mansions fiasco." Fergus Sheil of The Age said: "Sindi Watts knows that dishonesty, a meditation tape and a lavender wheat bag should be an integral part of any intimate relationship, and that's why we love her to bits." Billy Sloan of the Sunday Mail branded the character "disaster-prone". A TV Soap reporter branded Sindi a "slightly unhinged material girl" and said she took "drastic steps" during her time on the show.

Daniel Kilkelly from Digital Spy said "we always had a soft spot for Sindi in her hilarious Making Mansions days." Upon on her 2017 return, the reporter believed Sindi's life was "weirder than ever". Kilkelly profiled eight evil Sindi moments, observing that she has "never been shy when it comes to bending the rules for a fast buck." He added that trouble seemed to follow her around. Kilkelly also branded her a "comedy character", "bubbly blonde", "outrageous character" and "butter-spreading ladder fiend".
