= Liljana Bishop =

- Neighbours character
- Portrayed by: Marcella Russo
- Duration: 2003–2005
- First appearance: 9 October 2003
- Last appearance: 25 October 2005
- Introduced by: Ric Pellizerri
- Book appearances: Summer Harvest
In-universe information
- Occupation: Receptionist; Manager of The Helen Daniels Trust; General Store assistant
- Father: Miroslav Ristic
- Mother: Svetlanka Ristic
- Brothers: Zoran Ristic
- Husband: David Bishop (until 2005)
- Sons: Luka Dokich
- Daughters: Serena Bishop

Liljana Bishop is a fictional character from the Australian soap opera Neighbours, played by Marcella Russo. She made her first on-screen appearance on 9 October 2003. In May 2005, the character was written out and she departed on 25 October 2005 following a plane crash.

== Casting ==
In May 2005, it was announced that three of the show's actors had been written out in a "surprise shake-up" of the cast. Russo was one of the three actors written out in favour of new cast members, the other two were Kevin Harrington (David Bishop) and Marisa Warrington (Sindi Watts). Russo left at the end of her contract. A few weeks later, it was announced that Lara Sacher (Serena Bishop) would also be departing as part of an "extremely dramatic storyline" in October of that year. Script producer, Luke Devenish said "All three Bishops will be leaving together ... in one of our most startling storylines for the year. Lil and David have been at the very forefront of stories this year – caught up in wicked Paul's web – and their departure ties into this. The door will be left open for their return, however, despite the spectacular circumstances."

== Storylines ==
Of Serbian descent, Liljana grew up under the dominant shadow of her mother Svetlanka (Deidre Rubenstein) and lived in Perth, Western Australia, surrounded by her family. However, her parents were less than pleased when she married Australian-born David Bishop aged only 19, but their marriage seemed to be a success and the two had a daughter named Serena.

When David is offered a job in Erinsborough the whole family move. They stay with David's father Harold (Ian Smith) until they can move into their newly built house in Eden Hills. David almost bankrupts the family when an old friend, Thomas Morgan swindles him out of all of the family's savings that were invested into a business venture. Liljana is forced to take a job working as a receptionist for Karl Kennedy (Alan Fletcher).

Serena begins dating Chris Cousens (Simon Mallory), who Liljana does not approve of. Liljana slaps Chris and worse to come when she discovers he has been taking indecent photographs of Serena. Things go from bad to worse when Svetlanka arrives and during a heated argument she tells David, the only reason Liljana married him is because she was pregnant. It emerges Liljana had been pregnant and wanted David to be a father for the child as the baby's father, Ivan Petrovic had fled the scene. Liljana been led to believe that the child was stillborn. Serena later makes friends with Luka Dokich (Keelan O'Hehir), Svetlanka's godson and they begin a relationship. Svetlanka is forced to reveal that Luka is Liljana's long-lost son, and paid a doctor to tell her the baby had died. Liljana later suffers from acute liver failure and needs part of a family member's liver to survive. Luka is a match her and undergoes surgery. Upon returning to good health, Svetlanka is promptly thrown out by Liljana while Luka later returns to his adoptive parents.

Paul Robinson (Stefan Dennis) offers Liljana a job as manager of his charity the Helen Daniels Trust. David becomes obsessed with his work and Liljana begins an affair with Paul and she and David separate, devastating Serena. When Liljana finds out about Paul's plot to destroy Erinsborough, she returns to David.

As part of the Lassiter's complex 20th anniversary celebrations, the Bishops and several of their neighbours boarded, Paul's son Robert (Adam Hunter) plants a bomb on the plane which explodes during the flight. David, Liljana and Serena hug one another as the plane crashes into Bass Strait. David's body is later recovered, but Liljana and Serena's bodies are not. At Serena and Liljana's memorial service, Susan Kennedy (Jackie Woodburne) reads a eulogy for her friend.

== Reception ==
The BBC said Liljana's most notable moment was "Revealing that she initially only got together with David because she was pregnant." Brian Courtis of The Age said that Liljana was one of the "desperates of Ramsay Street" that were straight talking. He added that "poor David doesn't just need a good lawyer" due to the manner that Liljana bemoans him. In 2015, a Herald Sun reporter included Liljana's death in their "Neighbours' 30 most memorable moments" feature.
