= Simon Mallory =

Australian actor

Simon Mallory is an Australian actor who played Chris Cousens in the Australian soap opera Neighbours from 2003 to 2005. He was a series regular on the Nine Network late night sketch comedy series Comedy Inc - The Late Shift.

Following high school graduation from Ignatius Park College, Townsville, he spent some time working as a stunt performer at a Japanese amusement park where he learned to speak Japanese.

He has acted on stage, including for the Melbourne Workers Theatre and the Australian Shakespeare Company.

Mallory has been in charge of the starting gun at Tough Mudder obstacle course races in Australia for many years motivating the crowd and having racers undertake the Tough Mudder pledge. At the end of the SEQ event in 2019, Simon was voted the preferred MC (85% preference rate) at the event over his sidekick Danny Alder.

In 2018, he appeared in commercials for RAA.

He currently works in the Thunder Lake Stunt Show at Sea World, where the Sun State All Stars and the Bay City River Rats perform a final showdown to decide once and for all who rules the iconic Sea World lake.

In 2022, he had a brief appearance in the Elvis movie as an NBC Floor Manager.
