= Marisa Warrington =

English-born Australian actress

Marisa Michelle Warrington is an English-born Australian actress, perhaps best known for playing Sindi Watts on the Australian soap opera Neighbours.

Warrington graduated from the National Theatre Drama School in 1996. She went on to appear in theatre productions with the Australian Shakespeare Company. She appeared in a number of television commercials and had a recurring role in the police drama Blue Heelers. She had two separate guest stints in Neighbours, before she was cast as Sindi Watts.

Warrington made her debut as Sindi on a recurring basis in 2002. Sindi became a regular character in 2004, living with Susan Kennedy and dating Toadfish Rebecchi and then Stuart Parker. She was involved in a range of storylines, including stripping and later on, prostitution, when she needed to pay for an operation to restore her boyfriend Stuart Parker's sight. In 2005 she left the show when her character was committed to a psychiatric hospital because of violent tendencies. Her final scenes were screened in Australia in August of that year. In February 2017, Warrington reprised her role for one episode. She made another appearance in February 2018 and returned for a longer stint from 26 June 2018.

Warrington formed the band Lucy De Ville with fellow Neighbours actress Marcella Russo and colleague Shaun Gardener. In 2009 she had a guest role on comedy series Mark Loves Sharon and in 2011 appeared in television series Winners & Losers.
