= Kevin Harrington (actor) =

Australian actor and comedian

- Born: Melbourne, Victoria, Australia
- Occupations: Actor, comedian
- Years active: 1976–present
- Spouse: Ann Harrington
- Children: 2

Kevin Harrington is an Australian stage, television and film actor and comedian, who is perhaps best known for his roles as Kevin Findlay on the Australian drama SeaChange in the 1990s and as David Bishop on the soap opera Neighbours.

== Early life ==
Harrington was born in Melbourne, Victoria. He graduated at Caroline Chisholm Catholic College in 1977.

== Career ==
Harrington joined the Neighbours cast in 1988 as David Bishop, who acts as best man for his father Harold Bishop's wedding to Madge. He returned as a regular in 2003. He was originally chosen partly for his facial resemblance to actor Ian Smith. His character was killed off in 2005 in a plane crash, alongside on-screen wife Liljana and on-screen daughter Serena. Harrington reprised the role in 2014 for the webseries Neighbours vs Zombies.

From 1998 until 2001, Harrington played the "slow-witted" business owner Kevin Findlay in SeaChange.

Harrington has appeared in several other television series, including Blue Heelers. He also was a contributing writer for the program All Together Now. He appeared in The Western Red Hill where he played a cop named Barlow. He played Chris Corrigan's brother Derek Corrigan in the Australian miniseries Bastard Boys in 2007. In 2008, he starred in the TV show Underbelly as Moran family patriarch Lewis Moran.

Harrington has also appeared in the movies The Dish, Australian Rules, and The Honourable Wally Norman. For the latter, he received a Best Actor nomination at the 2004 Australian Film Institute Awards.

Before getting into television, he worked in theatre and did stand-up comedy. He also provides voice-overs for radio and television advertisements. In particular, Harrington provided a voice-over for a Victorian Government sponsored television advertisement promoting Vocation Education & Training (VET) and Technical and Further Education (TAFE) courses in October 2006.

Harrington starred as ultramarathon runner Cliff Young in the 2012 ABC1 telemovie Cliffy. Harrington had to train and lose weight for the role. In 2014, Harrington reprised his role of Lewis Moran for the Underbelly spin-off Fat Tony & Co..

From 2016 until 2017, Harrington played Ivan in Network Ten drama The Wrong Girl. In 2019, he reprised his role of Kev in the rebooted SeaChange.

== Personal life ==
Harrington is married and has two daughters, Megan and Kaitlyn. Both of his daughters appeared as extras in SeaChange. Megan had a recurring role in Neighbours in late 2002 and early 2003 playing Heather Green the first girlfriend of regular character Boyd Hoyland.

== Filmography ==
=== TV appearances ===
Year	Title	Role	Notes
1985	The Henderson Kids	Gazza	
1985	Snowy River: The McGregor Saga	Charlie Quinn	
1988, 2003–2005	Neighbours	David Bishop	Series regular
1996	The Glynn Nicholas Show	Anaesthetist / Policeman	
1997–1999, 2001	Blue Heelers	Charlie McKinley	
1997	State Coroner	Bill Higgins	
1998–2001	SeaChange	Kevin Findlay	
1998	Raw FM	Spider	
1998	Driven Crazy	Joss	
1999	The Micallef Program	Dracula's Fishing Companion	
2003	Rove Live	Himself	
2007	Bastard Boys	Derek Corrigan	
2008	Underbelly	Lewis Moran	
2010	Sleuth 101	Barry	
2010	City Homicide	Chris Fleetwood	Episode: "The Price of Love"
2011	Winners and Losers	Nev Barnsworth	Episode: "It's Written in the Stars"
2011	Talkin' 'Bout Your Generation	Himself	
2012	Cliffy	Cliff Young	TV movie
2014	Fat Tony & Co.	Lewis Moran	
2014	The Doctor Blake Mysteries	Donald McEvoy	
2014	Neighbours vs Zombies	David Bishop	Webseries
2016	The Wrong Girl	Ivan Barnett	
2018	Show Me the Movie!	Himself	2 episodes
2018	Underbelly Files: Chopper	Lewis Moran	2 episodes
2019	SeaChange	Kevin Findlay	6 episodes
2020	Wentworth	Protective Custody Officer Roberts	Recurring
2021	Fraud Festival	Kevin Bryne	TV Movie
2022	Hot Department: Dark Web	Kevin	1 episode
2023	Turn Up the Volume	Cam	2 episodes
2023	Warnie	Bob Simpson	1 episode

=== Film appearances ===
Year	Title	Role	Notes
1996	My Second Car	Buddy	Short
2000	The Big Schmooze	Himself	
2000	The Dish	Ross Mitchell	
2002	Australian Rules	Mr Robertson	
2002	Guru Wayne	Detective Johnson	
2003	The Honourable Wally Norman	Wally Norman	
2004	Tom White	Neil	
2006	Nano Power	Nano Power	Short
2007	Opportunity Knocks	Frank	Short
2009	My Girlfriend Jim	Dad	Short
2010	Red Hill	Jim Barlow	
2019	Two Heads Creek	Noah	
