= Patrick Harvey (actor) =

Irish-Australian actor (born 1984)

- Born: 24 July 1984 (age 42); Melbourne, Victoria, Australia
- Occupation: Actor

Patrick Harvey (born 24 July 1984) is an Irish-Australian actor. He played Irish immigrant Connor O'Neill on the television soap opera Neighbours. His first appearance on the soap was in April 2002. Harvey spent most of his childhood in Belfast, Northern Ireland, although he moved back to Australia in August 1999.

He started acting when he was 9 years old and was in a number of ads and stage shows in the United Kingdom as well as voice over work. When he returned to Australia in August 1999 he had decided not to continue acting but only due to his parents' encouragement he pursued it in Australia. He had a few guest appearances on the ABC show The Saddle Club and long-running TV series Blue Heelers.

In 2003, Harvey won the Logie Award for Most Popular New Male Talent. He left Neighbours in February 2006 after a four-and-a-half-year run in the serial. His final scenes aired in early-mid-2006.

He has since appeared in a number of theatre shows and pantomimes in Australia, the United Kingdom and Ireland.

In 2008, he appeared in Australian telemovie Valentine's Day for the ABC and had a guest appearance in Rush for the Ten Network. Harvey toured Australia in HIT Productions' stage version of The Sum of Us (by David Stevens) in the role of Jeff made famous by Russell Crowe in the 1994 film version.

In 2012, Harvey reprised his Neighbours role for four weeks from late October in Australia and November for UK audiences. In 2015, he co-starred in the horror film Scare Campaign. A few years later, he appeared in the Australian television series Wentworth.

In 2022, he appeared in the drama Riptide as Andrew White.

== Filmography ==
| Year | Title | Role | Notes |
|---|---|---|---|
| 2023 | Call Me Chihrio | Utsumi | Voice (English ver) |
| 2022 | Riptide | Andrew White | 1 episode |
| 2018-20 | Wentworth | Detective Morelli | 7 episodes |
| 2019 | The Inbestigators | Steven | 1 episode |
| 2018 | The Cry | Declan | 1 episode |
| 2017 | Sherazade: The Untold Stories | Sinbad | 16 episodes (voice) |
| 2015-17 | Utopia (Australian TV series) | Adam | 3 episodes |
| 2016 | Scare Campaign | JD | |
| 2014 | Upper Middle Bogan | Tyler | 1 episode |
| 2002-12 | Neighbours | Connor O'Neil | 197 episodes |
| 2012 | Mrs Biggs | Lenny Clarke | 1 episode |
| 2010 | City Homicide | Darren Jacobs | 1 episode |
| 2009 | Rush | Stuart Tubbs | 1 episode |
| 2008 | Valentine's Day | Gary | TV Movie |
| 2002 | The Saddle Club:Adventure at Pine Hollow | Jake | |
| 2001 | The Saddle Club | Jake | 3 episodes |
| 2000 | Blue Heelers | MIchael Nelson | |
