= Marcella Russo =

Australian actress (born 1969)

- Born: 4 May 1969 (age 57); Adelaide, South Australia, Australia
- Occupation: Actress
- Years active: 1985–present

Marcella Russo (born 4 May 1969) is an Australian actress who is best known for her playing role as Liljana Bishop in the Australian soap opera Neighbours from 2003 until 2005.

== Early life ==
Marcella Russo was born in Adelaide, South Australia on 4 May 1969.

== Career ==
Russo began her career in Adelaide, working as an actress in theatre, film and radio. She was also a member of several bands. She left Adelaide for Melbourne in 1995, with the aim of furthering her success in the music industry. She wrote and performed in the bands: She Is Me and Swallow.

Russo joined the cast of the long-running soap opera Neighbours in 2003, as Harold Bishop’s Serbian daughter-in-law, Liljana Bishop, having auditioned for the role. Her character (along with her husband and daughter) was killed off in a plane crash.

Russo appeared as Magenta in a Neighbours all-stars stage production of The Rocky Horror Show at Melbourne's Regent Theatre in 2004. She also became a member of the band Lucy De Ville, alongside friend Shaun Gardener (whom she had performed with in her previous band, Swallow) and later, former Neighbours co-star Marisa Warrington.

Additionally, Russo is a voiceover artist, having lent her voice to campaigns for AAMI, Toblerone, Yellow Pages, Soul Pattinson and Monash IVF.

Russo is also a qualified naturopath with a Bachelor of Health Science to her name.

== Personal life ==
During her time playing Liljana Bishop in Neighbours, Russo was the real life partner of fellow Neighbours actor Brett Swain, who played Kim Timmins.

== Filmography ==
=== Film ===
Year	Title	Role	Notes	Ref.
1988	The Dreaming	Young Nurse		
1990	Struck by Lightning	Connie		
1994	Addio tradizione	Sylvanna		
1999	Redball	Newsreader		
2004	Josh Jarman	Service Station Attendant		
2015	Crime & Punishment	Fletcher		

=== Television ===
Year	Title	Role	Notes
1998	SeaChange	Sister Rossi	Episode: "Sex, Death and Bridges"
1999, 2002	Stingers	Dr. Glenda Wales / Marita da Costa	2 episodes
2000, 2002	Blue Heelers	Tonya Berenski / Rosa Crivelli	2 episodes
2003	The Secret Life of Us	Maria	Episode: "Nature or Nurture?"
2003–2005	Neighbours	Liljana Bishop	59 episodes
2004	Noah and Saskia	Ms Cascarino	2 episodes
2010	Rush	Bianca	Episode: "Run"

== Theatre ==
Year	Title	Role	Notes	Ref.
1992	Conversations with George Sandburgh After a Solo Flight Across the Atlantic		Theatre 62, Adelaide with Next Stage Theatre Company	
1993	The Keys to the Animal Room		Junction Theatre, Adelaide	
1993	Flowers and Chocolates		Junction Theatre, Adelaide	
1994	A Little Like Drowning		Playhouse, Adelaide with STCSA	
1996	Hearts of Fire		Courthouse Theatre, Melbourne	
2005	The Trial of Adolf Eichmann	Kitia Altman	Courthouse Theatre, Melbourne	
2006	Hotel Sorrento	Pippa	Devonport Entertainment and Convention Centre, Theatre Royal, Hobart with HIT Productions	
2007	Wild East	Dr Gray	Red Stitch Actors Theatre, Melbourne	
2007–2008	Kill the Wolf		Dantes, Melbourne, BlackBox, Melbourne with 9Minds	
2008	The Late Henry Moss		Chapel Off Chapel, Melbourne with Human Sacrifice Theatre	
2009	A Narrow Time for Angels	Maggie	The Store Room, Melbourne	
2009	My Dog Has Stripes		Fortyfivedownstairs, Melbourne	
2011	The Haunting of Daniel Gartrell	Sarah	Fortyfivedownstairs, Melbourne with Straightjacket Productions	
