= Dylan Timmins =

- Neighbours character
- Portrayed by: Damien Bodie
- Duration: 2005–2007, 2020
- First appearance: 3 February 2005
- Last appearance: 19 March 2020
- Introduced by: Ric Pellizzeri (2005); Jason Herbison (2020)
In-universe information
- Occupation: Student at Erinsborough High; Personal assistant; Hot dog seller; Co-manager of Lucinda's Cafe; Chef
- Father: Kim Timmins
- Mother: Janelle Timmins
- Brothers: Dwayne Timmins; Brandon Timmins; Stingray Timmins
- Sisters: Janae Timmins; Anne Baxter; Bree Timmins
- Sons: Scotty
- Daughters: Kerry Mangel
- Grandfathers: Alwin Timmins
- Grandmothers: Loris Timmins
- Uncles: Kevin Rebecchi
- First cousins: Shane Rebecchi; Stonefish Rebecchi; Toadie Rebecchi
- Other relatives: Yashvi Rebecchi

Dylan Timmins is a fictional character from the Australian soap opera Neighbours, played by Damien Bodie. He made his first appearance during the episode broadcast on 3 February 2005. Dylan is introduced as part of the extended Timmins family, created around the established character Stingray Timmins (Ben Nicholas). Dylan is characterised as a "bad boy" and often gets into trouble with his criminal behaviour. He is also very loyal and protects his family no matter the consequence. Dylan is portrayed as having a difficult relationship with his mother Janelle Timmins (Nell Feeney), who blames him for any problems in the family. His introduction into the series explored their mother/son dynamic as Dylan feels unloved by Janelle. Writers also created a "father figure" for Dylan, Paul Robinson (Stefan Dennis) and he becomes Paul's protégé carrying out jobs for him.

Writers paired Dylan with Sky Mangel (Stephanie McIntosh) for his first romantic relationship. They later break-up and he begins a relationship with Elle Robinson (Pippa Black), but writers created a complex story in which Sky reveals she is pregnant with Dylan's child despite mistakenly believing Stingray to be the father. Dylan was also used to portray a fake death story in which he lets his family believe he died in a plane crash. Bodie chose to the leave the show in 2006 and departed on 30 March 2007. Bodie later agreed to reprise the role and Dylan returned as part of Neighbours' 35th anniversary celebration episodes on 19 March 2020.

== Casting ==
Damien Bodie had previously made two appearances in Neighbours as Charlie Moyes in 1996 and Liam Rigby in 1999, before securing the role of Dylan Timmins in 2005. Bodie did not think he would be cast as a series regular due to his looks, saying "Being pale and skinny, I never thought I'd be a long term Neighbours regular. I wasn't tanned or beachy. I thought that would never happen." He also had reservations about the character's bogan background, as they are from the country and he was a city boy from Melbourne.

== Development ==
=== Characterisation ===
"Dylan Timmins was the ultimate bad boy. Growing up bang in the middle of the dysfunctional Timmins family, no-one expected much more from him than a graduation from juvenile detention into a career of petty crime."

— An excerpt from Dylan's profile on the official Neighbours website.

Dylan is characterised as a "bad boy" role from a dysfunctional family and those around him expect that he will live a life of crime. On Dylan's profile on the official Neighbours website, he is described as having "an affinity for the underdog". He also very loyal which often the cause of his bad behaviour and crimes. Dylan main loyalties are to his family and will take revenge on anyone who harms them. Over time Dylan tries to change his ways, enrolling in school and trying to better himself. Bodie has described Dylan as "an outcast who needs a lot of help."

=== Introduction ===
Dylan was the third member of the Timmins family to be introduced, following his younger brother Stingray Timmins (Ben Nicholas) and their mother Janelle Timmins (Nell Feeney). Prior to his arrival, Dylan was serving time in juvenile detention for a robbery. He decides to visit his brother in Erinsborough rather than return to his home in Colac. Bodie called his character "the black sheep of the family – definitely more of an outsider than Stingray." He explained that Janelle did not love Dylan as much as his siblings, which caused Dylan to pick on Stingray, who just sees him as the older brother who "bashed him up." Dylan tells Stingray's guardian Susan Kennedy (Jackie Woodburne) that he is close with his brother, but when Stingray returns home he punches Dylan. Bodie said Dylan is jealous of Stingray's new home life and he is also attracted to his girlfriend Serena Bishop (Lara Sacher). He joked, "Dylan will basically go after anything with two legs. His eyes pop out of his head when he sees Serena. He can't believe Stingray has done so well for himself!" Susan invites Dylan to stay, much to Stingray's displeasure, and she has to play "peacemaker" between them. Dylan insists that he has changed, but Stingray suspects that he is out for what he can get.

Writers focused on Dylan's fractured relationship with his mother Janelle. She often shows favouritism towards Stingray and blames Dylan for any problems in the family. This leaves Dylan hurt and confused as to why Janelle resents him. Bodie told an Inside Soap reporter that Dylan loves his mother and would "do anything" to share the same relationship with her that Stingray has. He added "He can't understand why she doesn't feel the same way. He knows he's made some mistakes in his life but, even so, that doesn't explain why Janelle holds such resentment towards him." Susan becomes worried and tries to offer advice to them to resolve their differences. Bodie explained that Susan can see "how much Dylan is hurting" because of the rift. Stingray behaves bad to make Dylan appear more favourable, but "Janelle still finds a way to paint Dylan as the villain." Writers developed the rift further and this culminates in an angry argument between the two. When Dylan buys an expensive ring for Janelle's birthday, she accuses him of stealing it. Bodie added "it builds to a huge argument. Eventually, Dylan just can't take anymore. He demands to know why his mother doesn't love him - and her answer shocks everyone."

Dylan is taught business studies by Paul Robinson (Stefan Dennis) and he begins to find his mentor "inspirational". The official Neighbours website detailed that "they formed a bizarre mentor/protégé bond, Dylan replacing his absent father and Paul making up for neglecting his own children." Paul becomes embroiled in a plot to develop the land that Ramsay Street is built on. He partners with the firm Affirmacon and helps carry out their schemes. Dylan refuses to believe that Paul is doing any wrong. Stephanie McIntosh who plays Dylan's love interest Sky Mangel believed that even her character could not come between Dylan and Paul. She described Dylan as Paul's protégé and he ignores Sky's worries about Paul's role in Affirmacon. She explained that "Dylan refuses to believe anything bad about Paul. He idolises him." Dylan also saves Paul's life after he is pushed from a cliff by members of Affirmacon.

=== Relationships with Sky Mangel and Elle Robinson ===
Dylan's first romantic relationship was created with Sky. Writers began to bring to an end Sky's established relationship with Boyd Hoyland (Kyal Marsh). Initially Dylan and Sky's relationship was disliked by McIntosh, who believed that Sky was better suited to Boyd. She could not understand why Sky would choose Dylan over Boyd, despite it being an "interesting journey". McIntosh also told Jason Herbison from Inside Soap that she wanted writers to reconsider their decision to split Sky and Boyd. On-screen Dylan and Sky first share a kiss while Boyd is in hospital in a coma. When Boyd recovers, he tells Boyd that he kissed Sky and that she knows Boyd had previously kissed Serena Bishop (Lara Sacher). Bodie told a reporter from Inside Soap that Dylan interferes in their relationship because he thinks there are too many secrets between them. Writers played Dylan as having an obvious attraction towards Sky. Bodie explained that they are not a conventional pairing but, "Sky is very motherly and always looks on the bright side of life, which appeals to Dylan."

When Sky and Boyd break up, Dylan tries to get together with a reluctant Sky. McIntosh told Herbison that Sky felt it was too soon to move on from Boyd. Though she added "I don't really know what attracts her to Dylan, but they have kissed, so there must be something there." When Sky continues to feud with Paul over his involvement with Affirmacon, Dylan refuses to listen to her accusations about Paul. He does agree to help her rescue birds from a swamp polluted with toxic waste, which Affirmacon caused. Dylan risks his life to save the birds and the toxic waste makes him ill. McIntosh explained that this was the point in the story in which Sky begins to like Dylan. She added that "Sky gets to see a different side to Dylan, and it brings them closer together, the fact that he is willing to put his own health at risk says a lot to her." Dylan's subsequent sickness also "unites them" and she concluded that their relationship is "rather bizarre". The duo later decide to embark on an actual relationship.

Following Dylan and Sky's break-up following Sky having sex with her art lecturer, Jean-Pierre Valasco (Steven Cabral), writers paired Dylan with Paul's daughter Elle Robinson (Pippa Black). Their relationship is problematic because Sky reveals that she is pregnant with Dylan's child. Bodie described it as a "difficult position" for Dylan and Sky because they are no longer together. Dylan is "determined to remain loyal to Elle" and "feels bad" about the pressure Sky's pregnancy causes on their relationship. Bodie believed that Dylan actually wants "a happy ending" with Sky. In addition Sky had sex with Stingray and chose to keep it a secret. When Sky becomes ill and collapses, a scan reveals that the is Stingray's instead of Dylan's and she decides to keep its paternity concealed. Bodie said that writers wanted to keep it a secret for to create some big reveal scenes, which would "be awful for everyone".

In November 2006, Bodie told Herbison that the plot was "complex" and the actors had "difficulty following what's going on." Dylan and Elle's relationship was portrayed as loveless, with Dylan pining after Sky. Bodie noted that "everyone knows that Dylan and Sky still love each other, and should be together." Sky remains determined to keep the truth hidden and Elle becomes worried she will lose Dylan. Elle is a "treacherous" character who will scheme to get what she wants. Dylan decides he wants to get back together with Sky so Elle pretends that she has been diagnosed with a terminal illness. Elle gets Paul to help support her story which completely fools Dylan. Bodie explained that Dylan feels "there's no way he can leave Elle now, regardless of what he really wants." Dylan is "heartbroken" and is forced to tell Sky he is choosing to remain with Elle. When Dylan discovers Elle's lies he reunites with Sky and they become engaged.

Dylan is excited about the prospect of becoming a father. Bodie told a reporter from Soaplife that Dylan believes the baby will be "the one pure thing" in his life. Sky's guilt begins to affect her pregnancy and she is taken into hospital. Sky tells Dylan that he is not the father of the baby. He is upset and Bodie explained that he wants to hurt Sky emotionally and tells her they can remain together if she adopts the baby. She decides to tell Dylan the truth about Stingray being the father. Dylan is furious and invites Stingray on a night out, pretending all is well. Nicholas stated that Dylan tricks his character and reveals "the awful truth" and informs him that "they're no longer brothers". It is difficult for Stingray because he has to tell Dylan the truth and accept he is the father. Bodie recalled that the scene with Nicholas were fun but emotional to film.

Dylan reunites with Elle but Paul becomes determined to ruin their relationship. When he discovers that Oliver Barnes (David Hoflin) will inherit a fortune, he tries to get Elle and Oliver in a relationship. Oliver was already partnered with Carmella Cammeniti (Natalie Blair) and Paul enlists Ned Parker (Daniel O'Connor) to help break the two couple up. When Dylan, Elle, Oliver, Carmella and Ned go on holiday together, the latter begins his scheme. Ned gets Dylan and Carmella drunk and places them in the same bed. The following morning they wake up together and are caught by Elle and Oliver. Hoflin said that "Elle is completely furious and splits up with Dylan immediately." Later Paul "stirs everything up with Elle" and makes her decide to pursue Oliver.

=== Robbery and fake death ===
"Dylan and Connor's motives aren't as bad as they seem. After the crash, they assumed that they were the only survivors. They also think that they're both likely to go to prison if they return home, which means their families won't want to know them - it's easier to stay dead."

— Bodie explaining Dylan's reasons for faking his own death. (2006)

Producers lined up a fake death story for Dylan which coincided with the show's twentieth anniversary and infamous plane crash episode. The story begins when Dylan's enemy Roo Hausman (Richard Cawthorne) kidnaps Stingray. He forces Dylan to commit an armed robbery at a petrol station to secure Stingray's freedom. After Roo makes sure that Dylan is solely implicated and hands the gun used in the robbery to the police. Bodie described the act "the final straw" for Dylan, he knows he will be sent to prison for the crime. Sky remains unaware of the crime and Dylan decides to confide in Paul. Bodie said that Paul is "really angry" and disowns him. Paul later reconsiders and creates a plan to secure Dylan's freedom. He books Dylan onto an aeroplane joy ride alongside other residents, which is bound for Tasmania. Paul states that when the plane lands, he will help him escape. Bodie explained that Dylan views the flight as one last opportunity to spend time with Sky. Dylan discovers that the police intend on arresting him when the plane lands, but an onboard explosion mid-air causes the plane to crash into the Bass Strait.

Dylan survives the plane crash but mistakenly believes he is the sole survivor. Dylan washes up on the beach and hatches a plan to fake his own death to escape imprisonment. Dylan finds Connor O'Neill (Patrick Harvey) on the beach who decides to fake his own death too. Bodie defended the character stating that "he's devastated because he thinks that Sky is dead" and "they decide it is better to stay dead" because of their crimes.

The rest of the Timmins' accept that Dylan has died and arrange a memorial service for him. In Tasmania, Dylan and Connor struggle to survive and scavenge for food in other people's garbage. They find a discarded newspaper which features an article covering the plane crash. The article informs Dylan that Sky survived the crash and that Stingray has confessed to committing the robbery. Writers played Dylan remaining true to his characterisation as loyal to his family. Dylan decides that he must return to confess his role in the robbery to spare Stingray. Bodie stated that Stingray's confession "changes everything for Dylan. He can't let his brother cop the blame for something he did." Dylan plans to "apologise to everyone and confess all about the robbery." When Dylan returns to Erinsborough he interrupts his own funeral service while his mother is delivering a eulogy, which shocks her. The actor explained that "at first, there's relief, but it turns to anger. Furious that he let everyone believe he was dead. Janelle hugs him and then slaps him." He concluded that "things aren't going to be as simple as Dylan hopes" because of the robbery investigation.

Dylan and Stingray are sent to prison, Paul decides he needs to get his friend released. He tracks Roo down and offers him money to make a confession for his part in the crime. But the police catch Roo and send him to the same prison that Dylan is in. Bodie said "Dylan totally loses it when Roo turns up, as far as Dylan's concerned, Roo's to blame for everything that's happened over the past few months." The prison story played out with the three characters trying to adjust and Dylan looking after Stingray, who has ADHD.

=== Departure and return ===
In October 2006, it was announced that Bodie had decided to leave Neighbours. In the build up to Dylan's exit, Stingray dies and his anger becomes problematic. Dylan realises that he needs to regain control of his life and moves away from Erinsborough. Dylan departed during the episode broadcast on 30 March 2007.

On 24 November 2019, Neighbours confirmed that Bodie would reprise the role for the show's 35th anniversary episodes in March 2020. Dylan is one of ten returning characters for the milestone. Producer Jason Herbison stated that "we're thrilled to be joined by an honour-roll of returnees, chosen to represent a cross section of past eras of the show." Dylan returned on 19 March. He is called to Erinsborough by his former partner Sky, with whom he has three children. Dylan initially assumes that Sky wants to reunite with him, but soon learns that she is marrying Lana Crawford (Bridget Neval). He eventually gives the wedding his blessing. Of their family situation, McIntosh said "The hardest thing for Sky is telling Dylan and making sure he's okay with it – they have three kids, now they are a modern family and are all in it together."

== Storylines ==
After arriving in Erinsborough, Dylan goes to the Community Hall and berates a man who was being cruel to a dog. Sky and Serena Bishop witness this and are impressed. Dylan goes to Susan Kennedy's house, where his brother Stingray is living. Dylan tells Susan and Serena that he had just been released from juvenile detention. When Stingray returns home, he punches his brother. Dylan claims that he has been violent towards Stingray in the past and Susan convinces Stingray to give Dylan another chance. Susan invites Dylan to stay with her and gets him a place at Erinsborough High. On his first day, Dylan takes his car and convinces Serena and Stingray to take the morning off school. Stingray later tells Susan what they had done.

Dylan observes a local dog-catcher and releases all the dogs from his van. He tries this a second time, but is prevented by Stingray. However, when the dog-catcher catches Susan's dog Audrey, Dylan and Stingray break into the pound and release all the dogs. They narrowly escape being caught. When Susan finds out she tells him that they are on their final chance, though she is grateful to have Audrey back. Janelle Timmins returns to Ramsay Street and Dylan moves in with her. Dylan admires Paul when he starts teaching a business class at Erinsborough High. Paul takes an interest in Dylan and gives him a job evicting squatters from houses owned by Paul. Dylan soon becomes Paul's right-hand man. Dylan and Stingray's sisters, Janae (Eliza Taylor-Cotter) and Bree (Sianoa Smit-McPhee), also arrive and move in.

When Sky goes through a rough patch with boyfriend Boyd, she and Dylan share a kiss. David Bishop (Kevin Harrington) looks down his nose at the family. Dylan later proceeds to lose his temper and destroys the interior of the Bishop household. Dylan is apprehended by Paul who provides him with an alibi. Dylan's old friend Roo appears and tries to convince Dylan to help him with a robbery. Paul convinces him to set up his friend to be arrested by the police in an attempted robbery of the Scarlet Bar. Dylan spends more time with Sky after she breaks up with Boyd. However, she maintains that she just wants to be friends with Dylan.

When Sky and Dylan try to save some animals that had been poisoned in the contaminated Lassiter's Lake, Dylan is poisoned himself. He later discovers that he is now more susceptible to cancer and other ailments. After some help from Paul, Sky and Dylan, and the other residents, manage to bring down Affirmacon, a corporation Paul was originally working with. Affirmacon were planning to buy out Ramsay Street, so they could build a shopping centre on the land. Paul is kidnapped and pushed off a cliff. Sky and Dylan find him and Paul's leg is infected and needs to be amputated. Dylan forges Paul's signature to save his life. Paul is livid, but realises that Dylan had acted within his best interests. Sky and Dylan begin a relationship.

For the 20th anniversary of Lassiter's, Paul asks Dylan and his daughter Elle to come up with competing celebration ideas. Dylan wins with his plan for an extravagant 40s-style joy-flight from Melbourne to Tasmania. Roo reappears and kidnaps Stingray and threatens violence against him unless Dylan robs a service station at gunpoint. Following the robbery Roo makes an anonymous tip-off to the police. Paul agree to help Dylan as they set off on the joy-flight, but warns him he might never be able to return. However, a bomb, that had been planted on the plane, explodes over the Bass Strait. Dylan is washed up the shore along with Connor. Dylan decides to fake his own death and escape prison. The pair live rough in the bush for some time.

Dylan finds a newspaper about the plane crash, and that Sky has survived. He returns to Erinsborough to clear Stingray's name, after he had been arrested for the robbery. Dylan is surprised to see his father Kim (Brett Swain) had returned and Dylan goes to his memorial service and is arrested. Stingray and Dylan are sent to prison. Stuart Parker (Blair McDonough) goes undercover as Mick Farrow to get them released. However, Roo recognises Stuart and arranges a riot. Dylan manages to get a confession out of Roo, which was recorded. The brothers are released and Sky and Dylan re-kindle their relationship.

Dylan sets up "Dyl-Dogs", a mobile hot dog cart. He gives his business to Kim, when he becomes head chef and manager at Lucinda's café. Paul's son Robert (Adam Hunter) frames Dylan, by poisoning some food and stealing money. He then causes some shelves to hit Elle. Dylan is blamed and Paul sacks him. Sky has an affair with her art lecturer, Jean-Pierre, and she tells Dylan. He breaks up with her and goes to see Jean-Pierre, but does not hurt him. Dylan gets a job at the Scarlet Bar and starts dating Elle. Sky then tells Dylan that she is pregnant. Dylan realises that he still loves Sky and tells Elle that he is considering getting back with her. Elle lies to Dylan that she has a serious illness and he stays with her. Elle later tells him the truth and he gets back with Sky and he proposes to her.

Sky tells Dylan that the baby could not be his as it is too small and he is devastated when she tells him that Stingray is the father. Dylan disowns Stingray as his brother and gets back with Elle. Sky gives birth to a daughter, who she names Kerry (Claudine Henningsen). Stingray takes Kerry from the hospital and Dylan finds them. He takes Kerry to a hotel, but Elle finds them and returns Kerry. Sky, Dylan and Stingray decide to have a DNA test and it is announced that Dylan is Kerry's father. Paul decides to split Elle and Dylan up and employs Ned Parker (Dan O'Connor) to make it look like Dylan cheated. It works, and Elle breaks up with Dylan. When Kerry is diagnosed with leukaemia, Dylan blames Paul and he punches him. Stingray saves Kerry, but he dies from an aneurysm.

Dylan kidnaps Paul, blaming him for Stingray's death. He pushes him off the same cliff, which Paul had been thrown from before. Dylan later helps him up. Dylan realises his rage is getting out of control and begs Allan Steiger (Joe Clements) to arrest him. Steiger tells him that Janelle had already lost one son and could not bear to lose another. Dylan trashes the Scarlett Bar and he is discovered by Boyd. Kim coaxes Dylan into attending the funeral. Steiger tells Kim to take Dylan away from Erinsborough to regain his mind. Dylan claims he is angry all the time and that he could not laugh or cry or share stories about Stingray. Kim convinces him that it would be better for all if he goes away to regain his composure, so he can return and be a proper father to Kerry. Dylan says his goodbyes, though only Bree realises what is happening and begs him to stay. Dylan promises to return when he gets better. Dylan and Kim start work on a tourist boat in Port Douglas and when Sky visits him, he has a job as a chef. He ultimately reunites with Sky, and the couple have two further children.

13 years later, after their relationship experiences difficulties, Dylan returns to Erinsborough to meet Sky who has also returned. He is aware of a wedding expo that is taking place at Lassiters Hotel and assumes that Sky called him because she wants to get married. However, much to Dylan's disappointment, she reveals that she is unhappy with him and wants to marry Lana Crawford. Dylan is disappointed and visits a mural dedicated to Stingray where he reunites with Paul. Dylan then gives Sky and Lana his blessing and attends their wedding before departing Erinsborough once more.

== Reception ==
A writer for the BBC said Dylan's most notable moment was "Getting beaten up by Stingray when he arrived in Erinsborough!" A Daily Record reporter stated "Ever since Dylan Timmins arrived in Erinsborough, it's been clear that his bad boy image is nothing more than a front. Instead, he's a sensitive, caring lad whose big heart has won him the love of feisty Sky Mangel - which is no mean feat." Another reporter for the paper quipped that although Dylan had "a bad reputation" when he first appeared, he had since become "a noble, kind-hearted lad". Tina Burke from TV Week branded the character a "bad boy" and opined that "Dylan's life was tumultuous."
