= List of Neighbours characters introduced in 2005 =

The following is a list of characters that first appeared in the Australian soap opera Neighbours in 2005, by order of first appearance. They were all introduced by the show's executive producer Ric Pellizzeri. The 21st season of Neighbours began airing on 10 January 2005. Four members of the Timmins family were introduced across the year, beginning with Dylan Timmins in February. His sisters Janae and Bree followed in April and their father began appearing from October. Genevieve Doyle, a love interest for Toadfish Rebecchi, made her first appearance in March. Linda Hartley-Clark returned to the show in April as new character Gabrielle Walker and Max and Izzy Hoyland's father Bobby made his debut in May. Former Australian Idol contestant, Daniel O'Connor, joined the cast as Ned Parker in August, along with three members of the Kinski family. Paul Robinson's youngest daughter, Elle began appearing from September and the final member of the Kinski family, Katya, arrived in December.

== Dylan Timmins ==
Dylan Timmins, played by Damien Bodie, made his first on-screen appearance on 3 February 2005. Dylan is the older brother of Stingray, Janae and Bree Timmins. Brodie appeared twice in Neighbours in 1996 and 1999, before landing the role of Dylan. Of his casting, Brodie said "Being pale and skinny, I never thought I'd be a long term Neighbours regular. I wasn't tanned or beachy. I thought that would never happen."

== Genevieve Doyle ==
Genevieve Doyle
- Neighbours character
- Portrayed by: Lulu McClatchy
- First appearance: 18 March 2005
- Last appearance: 8 April 2005
- Introduced by: Ric Pellizzeri
In-universe information
- Occupation: Primary School Teacher; Singer; Wrestler

Genevieve "Eva" Doyle, played by Lulu McClatchy, made her first on-screen appearance on 18 March 2005. Genevieve became a love interest for Toadfish Rebecchi.

McClatchy auditioned for the role of Eva and she decided to make the audition memorable for the casting team by making the role funny. McClatchy won the role and she was allowed to add some comedic lines to her scripts. McClatchy said that her character, Genevieve was a "fantastic character to play". She described her as "girly, but not a push over. She is funny, sarcastic and good fun." McClatchy said that Genevieve has many talents as she is a wrestler, a primary school teacher and a singer. She added that she loved playing the character and found the wrestling "daunting" as she had never done it before.

When Toadfish Rebecchi (Ryan Moloney) takes up wrestling, he meets Genevieve and they decide to team up. Toadie and Genevieve are attracted to each other, but Toadie is reluctant to get involved with her, despite her flirting with him. During a picnic, Genevieve tries to kiss Toadie, but he pulls away as he does not want to take things further. Toadie's friends make him think he is shallow, when they point out that Genevieve is not as thin as his previous girlfriends. Toadie realises this is getting in the way of his real feelings and he and Genevieve share their first kiss in public. Toadie then tells her that he wants to be her boyfriend. During a double date with Toadie's boss, Tim Collins (Ben Anderson) and his girlfriend, Genevieve is hurt to hear Tim telling Toadie to dump her as she is not good enough him. She tells Toadie that he needs to work out what he wants from their relationship when he does not rush to her defence. Both Toadie and Tim are left shocked when Genevieve performs at the opening of the Scarlet Bar. Toadie is amazed at her singing and he calls Genevieve his girlfriend in front of his clients and Tim.

Genevieve goes for an audition for a regular singing job at a jazz club after she sent them a tape of her singing. However, when she returns, she tells Toadie that the club did not hire her as her image was not right for them. Toadie offers to help her sue them, but Genevieve is not keen on the idea of being a poster girl for over-sized women. Toadie convinces her that if they won, it would be worth it and she decides to go along with the plan. They win the case and Genevieve is given a regular singing job at the club. However, shortly after, she is offered a place on a wrestling tour of Australia. She asks Toadie to join her, but he turns her down after finding out that the tour is for a year and he would have to give up his job. Genevieve decides to take Carmella Cammeniti (Natalie Blair) with her as a publicist. She and Toadie say goodbye and agree to try and stay loyal and in a year's time, if they still want to be together, then they would.

== Bree Timmins ==
Bree Timmins, played by Sianoa Smit-McPhee is the youngest member of the Timmins family. She made her first on-screen appearance on 4 April 2005. The Age described the character of Bree as "troubled" and "sullen" and Smit-McPhee said Bree was "a geek but a brainy one."

== Janae Timmins ==
Janae Timmins, played by Eliza Taylor-Cotter, made her first on-screen appearance on 4 April 2005. Janae is Bree's older sister, who is "mad about boys, has rather questionable fashion sense and loves nothing more than a great party." Taylor-Cotter was fifteen when she landed the role of Janae and she said "I was so excited when I got the role, the chance of getting something like this seems so small." Taylor-Cotter previously appeared in Neighbours as Jacinta Martin.

== Gabrielle Walker ==
Gabrielle Walker
- Neighbours character
- Portrayed by: Linda Hartley-Clark
- First appearance: 14 April 2005
- Last appearance: 4 May 2005
- Introduced by: Ric Pellizzeri
In-universe information
- Occupation: General Store Assistant

Gabrielle Walker, played by Linda Hartley-Clark, made her first appearance on 14 April 2005. In April, it was announced that Hartley-Clark would be returning to Neighbours for a four-week guest stint as the "mysterious" Gabrielle Walker. Hartley-Clark previously played Kerry Bishop and when she received the call asking her to return she said "my first response was, 'How? She's dead!' When I heard the storyline they had planned, I thought it was good and said yes right away." Gabrielle "sparks a bizarre relationship" with Harold Bishop (Ian Smith), who is shocked by her likeness to his deceased daughter.

When he is interviewing prospective employees for the General Store, Harold Bishop is shocked when Gabrielle walks in the Store. Harold is distracted during the interview and he apologises to Gabrielle and explains that she reminds him of someone he used to know. Harold then hires Gabrielle after realising she is perfect for the job. When Lou Carpenter (Tom Oliver) sees Gabrielle he is also stunned and after Harold calls her Kerry, he explains that she looks like his dead daughter. He assures her that it would not be a problem for him. Gabrielle tells Harold that she recently moved to the city from Shepparton, where her mother had just died. She explains that she want to work to get money for a ticket to Darwin, where she hopes to reunite with her father.

Gabrielle joins Harold at the Scarlet Bar to try and come up with a plan to prevent Ramsay Street being bought by the council. Harold's son, David (Kevin Harrington), arrives with his wife, Liljana (Marcella Russo) and they are both shocked to meet Gabrielle. Their reactions make her realise that the situation is too awkward and she quits her job. Harold goes to visit her in the city and offers to take her out for dinner. During the evening, Harold tells Gabrielle about his family and David and Liljana's marriage troubles. While she is comforting him, Gabrielle kisses Harold. He quickly leaves, but he returns with a photo of Kerry and Gabrielle realises how much she looks like her and how difficult things must be for Harold. Gabrielle and Harold clear the air and their friendship grows stronger, especially when she supports him through David's troubles. Harold offers Gabrielle the money for her ticket to Darwin, but she wonders whether to leave her new friend behind. However, when Kerry's daughter, Sky (Stephanie McIntosh), meets Gabrielle, she feels like she has a second chance to get to know her mother. This makes Gabrielle feel awkward as she does not know Sky, and she and Harold decide that it is best if she leaves for Darwin.

== Bobby Hoyland ==
Bobby Hoyland
- Neighbours character
- Portrayed by: Andrew McFarlane
- First appearance: 3 May 2005
- Last appearance: 14 June 2005
- Introduced by: Ric Pellizzeri
In-universe information
- Occupation: Engineer
- Wife: Rosie Hoyland (divorced)
- Sons: Max Hoyland
- Daughters: Izzy Hoyland
- Grandsons: Boyd Hoyland; Charlie Hoyland
- Granddaughters: Summer Hoyland; Holly Hoyland

Bobby Hoyland, played by Andrew McFarlane, made his first on-screen appearance on 3 May 2005. During his time in Ramsay Street, Bobby has romantic relationships with three women; Janelle Timmins (Nell Feeney), Susan Kennedy (Jackie Woodburne) and Lyn Scully (Janet Andrewartha). This led to Fergus Shiel of The Age calling Bobby a "sexually transgressive father" and a "wolfish womaniser". Shiel said that Bobby provides an outlet for Janelle, Susan and Lyn's "extramarital desires" and added "Revel in sensual desire and hidden discoveries as the libidinous Bobby untaps the magical powers of three wily women by accident, then finds himself out to sea with a shrivelled telescope." A Sunday Mail reporter branded the character a "love rat" for his cheating.

Bobby was absent for much of his children Max Hoyland (Stephen Lovatt) and Izzy Hoyland's (Natalie Bassingthwaighte) childhood as his job as an engineer took him all over the world. Bobby's marriage to Rosie Hoyland (Maggie Millar) eventually broke down and their children were sent to boarding school. Bobby made a few visits to Max and Izzy and Max became resentful of him. Max and Izzy receive a letter from Bobby and he later arrives in town, much to Izzy's delight. Bobby discovers that his grandson, Boyd Hoyland (Kyal Marsh) is in a coma and goes to visit him. While he is talking to him, Boyd wakes up. Max is happy, but when he discovers that Bobby is at the hospital he is horrified. Izzy and Stephanie Scully (Carla Bonner), Max's wife, convince him to allow Bobby to stay and he agrees. Bobby later begins sleeping in a room at Max and Izzy's bar and he works there. On Bobby's first night in town he meets and accompanies Janelle Timmins to a casino. He later charms both Susan Kennedy and Lyn Scully. When Bobby hears that Rosie is coming to visit Max and Izzy, he packs his bags ready to leave. Lyn stops him and Rosie later cancels.

Bobby tries to make things right with Max by getting money to help pay for Steph's appeal against a murder charge. Despite Steph winning the case, Max is not impressed with his father's gesture. Max also discovers that his daughter Summer Hoyland (Marisa Siketa) is using Bobby's mobile phone and helping him to screen calls from his women. Bobby starts dating both Susan and Lyn and, since they had agreed to stay away from men, Bobby finds it easy to get them to keep the relationships a secret. As Lyn grows closer to Bobby, she tells Susan, who tells Bobby that it is over between them. Bobby splits up with Lyn as she wants to tell her family about them. Lyn tells Susan and Janelle what happened and the women realise that they have all been dating Bobby. Janelle asks Bobby to come over to her house and all three women tie him to a chair in his underwear. They tell him how he had left them feeling before they kick him out in front of Izzy. Bobby decides to leave town and asks Izzy for some money to start up a business. He arranges an engineering job overseas and tries to make a quick escape, however, Max finds him at the bus stop and tells him what he thinks of him. Bobby then leaves Erinsborough.

== Kayla Thomas ==
Kayla Thomas
- Neighbours character
- Portrayed by: Virginia Ryan
- First appearance: 9 June 2005
- Last appearance: 2 August 2005
- Introduced by: Ric Pellizzeri
In-universe information
- Daughters: Ashley Thomas

Kayla Thomas, played by Virginia Ryan, made her first on-screen appearance on 9 June 2005. She chooses Stephanie and Max Hoyland to be the adoptive parents of her child.

When Stephanie (Carla Bonner) and Max Hoyland (Stephen Lovatt) decide to adopt a child they are "thrilled" to be chosen by Kayla. Both Max and Steph are "saddened" to learn that the pregnant Kayla has no support from her family and is living in a refuge.

After finding herself pregnant, Kayla is thrown out of home by her parents. She decides to stay at a refuge rather than tell her boyfriend, Anthony (Adam Hunter) about the baby. Kayla decides to give up her unborn child for adoption and she meets with Max and Stephanie Hoyland through an adoption agency. Kayla breaks the rules of the agreement by contacting the Hoylands and telling them she needs to move out of the hostel she was staying in. Max catches Kayla stealing food from his bar and later sees her begging for money. Max and Steph decide to offer Kayla a room at their home. Kayla talks to Max's son, Boyd (Kyal Marsh), and she starts thinking that she might have other options instead of giving her child away. Kayla leaves Ramsay Street, but she later returns after realising that staying with the Hoylands was worth the risk. She bonds more with Boyd deepened and he accompanies her to the hospital when she goes into labour. Kayla gives birth to a girl, who she calls Ashley.

Kayla has doubts about giving up her baby and tells Boyd that she would not be doing it if she had a partner. Boyd then suggests that he becomes a father figure to Ashley, as he has bonded with her, and Kayla decides to keep her daughter. Max then allows Kayla to move in. Boyd and Kayla struggle to form a romantic connection and the atmosphere in the house almost causes the end of Max and Steph's marriage. This leaves Kayla feeling very guilty. The adoption agency discover that Kayla has been living with the Hoyland's and removes Max and Steph from the list of adoptive parents. Kayla decides to go, but she leaves Ashley behind. Steph tries to find Kayla and talk her around and she gets the address of Anthony's place. Kayla is there and she admits to Steph that Anthony knows nothing about the baby, but she is forced to tell him when Anthony appears. Anthony is happy about his daughter and he and Kayla reunite as the Hoyland's leave.

== Ned Parker ==
Ned Parker, played by Daniel O'Connor, made his first on-screen appearance on 9 August 2005. O'Connor was cast in the role after his elimination from the 2004 series of Australian Idol. Ned is the youngest of the Parker brothers. His older brothers are Stuart (Blair McDonough) and Steve Parker (Steve Bastoni). Ned first appears at Stuart's wedding to Sindi Watts (Marisa Warrington).

== Alex Kinski ==
Alex Kinski
- Neighbours character
- Portrayed by: Andrew Clarke
- First appearance: 10 August 2005
- Last appearance: 13 December 2005
- Introduced by: Ric Pellizzeri
In-universe information
- Occupation: Economics lecturer
- Brothers: Leo Kinski
- Wife: Francesca Sangmu (backstory); Susan Smith (2005)
- Sons: Zeke Kinski
- Daughters: Katya Kinski; Rachel Kinski
- Stepsons: Malcolm Kennedy; Billy Kennedy
- Stepdaughters: Libby Kennedy
- Nephews: Nate Kinski

Alex Kinski, played by Andrew Clarke, made his first appearance on 10 August 2005. The character and Clarke's casting details were announced shortly before he made his debut. Jackie Brygel of TV Week reported that widower Alex would be arriving with his two teenage children, Rachel (Caitlin Stasey) and Zeke (Matthew Werkmeister). Of the family, Clarke said "The Kinskis are pretty quirky. They're a bit of an odd bunch." Brygel confirmed that Alex was a love interest for established character Susan Smith (Jackie Woodburne). Clarke confessed that he had always wanted to be in Neighbours and added that it was "very nice" to be joining the cast. A month after the character's introduction, he was diagnosed with a rare form of lymphoma. Clarke explained that Alex has a blood test following a gas leak, and he learns that he has an aggressive form of cancer. The diagnosis prompts Alex to propose to Susan. Clarke told Brygel: "Alex really does love Susan and that's got nothing to do with his condition." Alex keeps his condition a secret from Susan, and when he is "overcome by feelings of doubt" he ends their relationship instead. Brygel observed that he quickly realises he has made a mistake and, knowing that his children need a mother, he proposes. Clarke admitted that his character was "scared" to tell Susan about his diagnosis, and while he is not a liar, he is not "a forthright kind of guy" either. The character's departure aired on 13 December 2005, as Alex dies shortly after marrying Susan and reconciling with his eldest daughter Katya Kinski (Dichen Lachman). A Daily Record reporter branded Alex "the most boring man in town".

Alex took over home schooling his children after his wife, Francesca, died. When Rachel and Zeke became teenagers, Alex decides to let them attend Erinsborough High School. Alex discovers that one of the teachers, Paul Robinson (Stefan Dennis), has spent time in prison. He talks to Susan Smith about his fears over Paul, but Susan talks him round and they later go for a drink. Alex decides to transfer Rachel and Zeke when Paul is arrested, but he later changes his mind. He also develops a crush on Susan and asks her out. Alex leaves Rachel and Zeke in the care of Stingray (Ben Nicholas) and Dylan Timmins (Damien Bodie) and he and Susan go to the Scarlet Bar. During the date, Rachel runs in and tells Alex that Zeke is missing. Alex discovers that Stingray sent Zeke out on a bike to do a delivery for the family business. Zeke ends up in hospital and Alex is furious. A few days later, Alex apologises to Susan and she invited him over for dinner. Alex arrives at Susan's and find the stove on fire and he puts out the flames. When Susan goes to kiss Alex, he decides to leave and accidentally hits Susan when he gets up.

Alex and Susan later share their first kiss during a picnic, which ends badly when Rachel and Zeke are caught up in a gas leak at the university. Alex runs into the building to look for his children, who are fine. Alex is told that he is suffering from Angioimmunoblastic T-cell lymphoma and is given months to live. Alex decides to keep the news to himself and he breaks up with Susan, telling her there is someone else. Alex is forced to collect Rachel from Ramsay Street and he tells Susan that there is no other woman. He then proposes to her and she later accepts. Alex collapses one night and decides to fight his illness. He goes to see a healer named Graham Harlin, who was actually con artist Jonathan Verne (Oscar Redding). Alex later decides against giving Graham money. Alex reveals to his doctor, Karl Kennedy (Alan Fletcher), that he has not told his family about his illness and he realises that Karl is Susan's former husband. Alex later tells Susan that he is ill and that his reason for the proposal was so his children would have someone to look after them. Susan then calls the relationship off.

Susan and Alex make up and Alex is told that he may have longer than a few months to live. Alex and Susan go on a joy flight to Tasmania, but an explosion sends the plane crashing into the sea. Alex and Susan are both found without serious injuries. Alex tells Susan that he has a third child Katya (Dichen Lachman), who he had thrown out of his home after he feared for Rachel and Zeke's safety. Alex's symptoms return and is he is told that he has just weeks to live. Alex tells Rachel and Zeke about his condition, while he and Susan bring their wedding forward. Katya arrives to see Alex, and they talk. Alex and Susan are married and a few hours later, Alex dies.

== Rachel Kinski ==
Rachel Kinski, played by Caitlin Stasey, made her first on-screen appearance on 18 August 2005. Rachel is the middle child of Alex Kinski (Andrew Clarke) and sister to Zeke (Matthew Werkmeister) and Katya (Dichen Lachman). Stasey was offered the part of Rachel Kinski when she was fifteen years old. Stasey described Rachel as "introverted" and someone who has led a sheltered life. She added that Rachel is also a "really sweet girl".

== Zeke Kinski ==
Zeke Kinski, played by Matthew Werkmeister, is the youngest member of the Kinski family. He made his first on-screen appearance on 22 August 2005. Werkmeister went through two auditions to secure the role of Zeke and said he was "absolutely ecstatic" when he heard he had won the part. Zeke was initially portrayed as anti-social and very clever, leading fans to believe he could have the characteristics of Asperger's Syndrome. Holy Soap describe Zeke as "bright" and "a bit of a geek".

== Elle Robinson ==
Lucinda "Elle" Robinson, played by Pippa Black, is the youngest daughter of Paul Robinson and Gail Lewis. She made her first on-screen appearance on 19 September 2005. The character was Black's first major role. Black described Elle as a "fairly cold, hard, fairly manipulative character." Network Ten describe the character as a "spoilt princess" who is a "country girl at heart".

== Kim Timmins ==
Kim Timmins
- Neighbours character
- Portrayed by: Brett Swain
- Duration: 2005–2007
- First appearance: 31 October 2005
- Last appearance: 30 March 2007
- Introduced by: Ric Pellizzeri
In-universe information
- Occupation: Barman; Hot Dog Salesman; Boat Tour Operator
- Father: Alwyn Timmins
- Mother: Loris Timmins
- Wife: Janelle Timmins (until 2007)
- Sons: Dwayne Timmins; Brandon Timmins; Dylan Timmins; Stingray Timmins
- Daughters: Janae Timmins; Anne Baxter
- Adoptive daughters: Bree Timmins
- Granddaughters: Kerry Mangel

Kim Timmins, played by Brett Swain, made his first appearance on 31 October 2005. The character's introduction was announced in September 2005. Kim marks Swain's second role in Neighbours, he previously appeared as John Swan the duck hunter who shot and killed Kerry Bishop (Linda Hartley-Clark) in 1990. Kim is the patriarch of the Timmins family and the sixth member to be introduced, following the arrival of his wife and four of their children the previous year. Swain had previously worked with both Nell Feeney and Damien Bodie, who play his on-screen wife and son.

Kim comes from an affluent background and his parents disapproved of him beginning a relationship with Janelle Rebecchi (Nell Feeney) Janelle was initially unaware of Kim's rich family. When Kim announces his plans to marry Janelle, his parents cut off his inheritance. His parents make offers of a job and a home for his family, but Kim turns them down. He later walks out on his family and Janelle tells her children that she threw him out. When his son, Dylan (Damien Bodie), goes missing in a plane crash, Kim rushes to Erinsborough to be with his family. Janelle allows him to stay and Kim bonds with Bree (Sianoa Smit-McPhee) and Stingray (Ben Nicholas). Dylan returns and Kim tries to hold the family together and he begins working alongside Joe Mangel (Mark Little) at Lassiter's. When Dylan and Stingray are sent to prison, Janelle tells Kim that she no longer needs him around. Bree lets down the tyres on Kim's van to stop him from leaving and she and Janae (Eliza Taylor-Cotter) convince Janelle to give Kim a chance. Kim and Janelle reunite just before Christmas, Stingray and Dylan are released from prison and Kim begins working at the Scarlet Bar.

Bree tells Kim that Janae's ex-boyfriend, Mike Pill (Alexander Cappelli), has been diagnosed as HIV positive and Janae had unprotected sex with him. Kim supports Janae and go to the surgery with her for tests. He agrees not to tell Janelle and when the tests come back negative, it brings the family closer. Kim loses his job and Janelle is angry, until Zeke Kinski (Matthew Werkmeister) asks her if she loves Kim. Janelle goes to Lassiter's and proposes to Kim. She suggests that a second wedding would fix their relationship. Kim accepts and realises that he will have to work long hours on Dylan's hotdog cart to pay for the wedding. Kim then starts selling unlicensed DVDs. Bree conducts a DNA test for a school project and Kim discovers that he is not her father. Janelle tells him that she did not cheat and demands a new test. The test reveals that neither Kim nor Janelle were Bree's parents. Kim and Janelle decides not to tell Bree the truth, but Janae finds out and tells Bree during an argument. Bree decides to find her real parents, but later changes her mind.

Dylan and Bree discover Kim's DVD business and Kim owns up to Janelle. Janelle is shocked, but takes the money for a deposit on a new house. Kim decides to stop selling DVDs, but the police discover that Kim is behind the business and come to arrest him on his wedding day. Stingray and Dylan distract the police and Kim and Janelle complete their vows. Kim then leaves his family and goes on the run. Kim goes to Queensland and begins working on the boat tours around Port Douglas, so he can send money to his family. Kim returns to Erinsborough when Stingray dies and is shocked to find Janelle dating Allan Steiger (Joe Clements). Kim becomes alarmed by Dylan's grief and Allan tells Kim to take Dylan back up north with him. Dylan and Kim say goodbye to the family after the funeral.

== Katya Kinski ==
Katya Kinski, played by Dichen Lachman, made her first on-screen appearance on 12 December 2005. Katya is the oldest daughter of Alex Kinski (Andrew Clarke) and older sister to Rachel (Caitlin Stasey) and Zeke (Matthew Werkmeister). Lachman originally auditioned for the role of Elle Robinson (later played by Pippa Black), but the producers decided to create the role of Katya for her. Katya has been described as "feisty" and "very complicated and full of contradictions".

== Others ==
Date(s)	Character	Actor	Circumstances
12 January–20 April	Sharon Cox	Emily Wheaton	Sharon "Shazza" Cox gatecrashes a leaving party for Lana Crawford and instantly befriends Stingray Timmins. They find that they have many things in common, like performing dangerous stunts. Shazza becomes aware that Serena Bishop is jealous of her and Stingray's relationship. She invites Stingray to her house and they have sex, before she tells him that she was only using him to make her boyfriend jealous. Sharon later dates Mike Pill, but he breaks up with her for Stingray's sister, Janae Timmins.
12 January–7 May	Lee Thomas	Patti Stiles	The Mayor of Erinstown, Idaho and an employee of land developers, Affirmacon. Lee offers to help David Bishop run for the local council if he sleeps with her, but his wife Liljana warns Lee off. Lee begins a relationship with Paul Robinson and she asks him to convince his neighbours to sell their houses, so Affirmacon can build a mall. She then sends Tony Corbett in to make sure the job is done, when Paul fails.
28 January – 12 November 2007	Roy Evans	Aleks Vass; Peter Byrne	Judge Roy Evans presides over Stephanie Scully's case for killing her grandfather and gives her a suspended sentence of three years. Roy dismisses an embezzlement case against David Bishop and presides over court when Darcy Tyler is tried for robbery. He also sends Dylan and Stingray Timmins to prison. Two years later, Roy gives Toadfish Rebecchi a fine and takes his driver's licence away, when he is charged with reckless driving, and he gives Susan Kennedy a one-year custodial sentence, suspended for three years, for hitting Bridget Parker with her car.
28 February–8 March	Frank Romano	Lliam Amor	Frank is a driver and bodyguard who worked for the Cammeniti family. When Carmella finds herself being stalked, Frank is assigned to keep an eye on her. When Carmella reveals that she turned down a date with an accountant, Frank has him arrested. However, Frank hits Carmella's boyfriend, Connor O'Neill, and ties him up in an abandoned house. Frank goes to see Carmella and when she hugs him, he makes the moment last longer and Carmella realises that Frank is her stalker. Stuart Parker saves her and Frank is arrested. He is granted bail and Carmella leaves town.
9 March–4 April	Andy Tanner	Craig Beamer	Andy asks life coach, Lyn Scully, to help him out and he develops feelings for her. Lyn is reluctant to get involved with Andy as he is married, but they begin a relationship. Andy's wife finds out about his affair and Lyn and Andy go public. Andy gets to know Lyn's young son, Oscar, and he tells her that he and his wife have no children. However, Andy's wife turns up with their two children and Lyn realises that she cannot be involved with Andy. She ends the relationship, which leaves Andy devastated.
18 March–15 August	Penny Weinberg	Sally Kingsford	Penny is a member of the Erinsborough High piano club. She befriends Summer Hoyland, but makes an enemy out of Summer's best friend, Lisa Jeffries. Lisa steals Penny's diary and reads it in front of everyone. Penny and Summer become friends with Bree Timmins and Penny builds her a new computer. Toadfish Rebecchi asks Penny to help retrieve a photo that was deleted from his computer. Toadie gives Penny a Star Trek figure as payment.
19 April–14 December	Reuben Hausman	Richard Cawthorne	Reuben was in a Colac prison with Dylan Timmins and he later decides to track Dylan down. Reuben asks Dylan to rob The Scarlet Bar with him and Dylan agrees to be the getaway driver, he then calls the police on Reuben who is taken to prison. Reuben kidnaps Dylan's brother, Stingray and forces Dylan to rob a petrol station. Both Dylan and Stingray are charged with robbery and sent to prison. Reuben is also caught and sent to the prison, where he organises a riot. Dylan becomes trapped with Reuben, who admits that he set the robbery up. The confession is caught on tape and Dylan and Stingray are released.
20 April–16 December	Mike Pill	Alexander Cappelli	Janae Timmins meets Mike, a popular Erinsborough High student, when he is dating Sharon Cox and decides that she wants him. Mike dates Janae, but he treats her badly by letting his friends try to kiss and grope her. Dylan Timmins fights with Mike and he dumps Janae. However, she begs him to take her back and they have unprotected sex. Janae later dumps him. Dylan and Mike later have another fight and Mike begins dating Karen Chambers, who is an enemy of Janae's. Months later Janae learns that Mike is HIV positive and has herself tested.
7 May–9 August	Kelly Weaver	Simone Ray	Kelly was Sindi Watts' best friend in high school. During a party, Kelly fell down some stairs was left in a wheelchair. It was rumoured that Sindi had pushed Kelly, causing her to become an outcast. Sindi makes regular visits to Kelly at her hospice and her boyfriend, Stuart, later comes to talk with Kelly. During Sindi's next visit to Kelly, she exaggerates and lies about recent events. Sindi tells Stuart that she likes to make things more exciting for Kelly to help her forget about her own situation. Kelly acts as bridesmaid as Sindi and Stuart's wedding. When it is revealed that Sindi is suffering from acute paranoid delusions, she admits to causing Kelly's accident.
23 May–17 June	Tony Corbett	Robert Morgan	Tony is sent to Erinsborough by Lee Thomas to keep an eye on Paul Robinson, who was trying to convince the residents of Ramsay Street to sell up. Tony threatens Paul into going ahead with the plan and he turns up with his men wherever Paul goes. Tony warns Paul that he will die if he double-crosses Affirmacon. He takes Paul into the bush and Paul tries to run, but he falls down a cliff. Tony believes he is dead and leaves town. A few months later, he is found dead in a house by the police. He was poisoned by ink used in poison pen letters directed at Paul.
1 June–27 July	Peter Reece	Tony Porter	Peter is an adoption agency official, who interviews potential adoptive parents Max Hoyland and Stephanie Scully. After learning that Max and Steph have broken several rules, Peter tells the Hoylands that they have been removed from the list of adoptive parents.
21 June–12 September	Gareth Peters	Philip McInnes	Gareth is a crooked nurse who works at Erinsborough Hospital. He steals roses from a comatose Darcy Tyler and insults him, but Darcy wakes up and punches him. Gareth notices Izzy Hoyland's addiction to prescription medication and he gives her some. She brings him back to Number 22 and Paul Robinson throws Gareth out the next morning. Gareth meets Izzy to give her more pills and Stuart Parker arrests them both.
30 June–2 August	Ashley Thomas	Amielle Lemaire	Ashley is the daughter of Kayla Thomas and Anthony Johnson. Kayla was initially going to have Ashley adopted by Stephanie and Max Hoyland. However, Kayla decides that she wants to keep Ashley. When Kayla feels guilty for causing Steph and Max pain, she leaves Ashley with them. Steph realises that she cannot keep the baby and finds Kayla at Anthony's house. Kayla tells Anthony that Ashley is his daughter and he promises to look after her.
7–12 July	Raylene Manson	Sharon Kershaw	Raylene is Stuart Parker's religious aunt. She comes to the city for a church convention and also decides to meet Stuart's fiancée, Sindi. Stuart and Sindi pretend they met at church and Raylene asks to meet their vicar. Stuart persuades Connor O'Neil to dress up as a vicar and Raylene falls for it, until Stuart and Sindi walk her to the bus station and she sees Connor helping a woman try on a bikini in his shop, Bounce. Raylene then slaps Connor for impersonating a priest.
8 July–23 September	Go-Go Riley	Kate Cole	Go-Go runs a courier company and hires Stingray Timmins. Go-Go flirts with him and makes suggestive remarks, forcing Stingray to threaten to sue for sexual harassment. Go-Go eventually fires him and Stingray and his family set up their own courier company. Go-Go confronts Janelle Timmins after she poaches Go-Go's customers and Janelle proposes that they compete in a bike race, with the loser quitting the business. Janelle wins, but a few days later she sells her company to Go-Go.
2 August	Anthony Johnson	Adam Hunter	Anthony is Kayla's boyfriend. She did not tell him that she was pregnant and she vanished. Kayla returns to him after she gives birth and gives the baby up for adoption and they start their relationship again. Stephanie, Max and Boyd Hoyland turn up at Anthony's parents' house with his daughter and Kayla tells Anthony the truth. He immediately accepts Ashley as his daughter and promises to look after her and Kayla. He also thanks the Hoyland's for looking after them.
11–14 November	Jake Rinter	Chris Toohey	Jake arranges a date with Rachel Kinski, when he thinks she is older than she is. During the date, Jake makes a crank call to Susan Kennedy and Rachel overhears him. Jake chases Rachel and tells her that Susan suspended him from school. Rachel's father has Jake warned by the police, but Rachel decides to see him in secret. She later dumps him when he tries to take things further with her.
17 November – 26 June 2006	Jenny McKenna	Carrie Barr	Jenny is a government advisor who goes on a successful date with Karl Kennedy. They go to a dinner party with Karl's ex-wife, Susan, and she and Jenny fight over politics. Jenny ends the relationship after believing Karl is still in love with Susan. Months later, Karl contacts Jenny and tells her that he is over Susan. Jenny discovers that a rival politician thinks she is too liberal for her party and Jenny announces her engagement to Karl. He asks Jenny to move in with him and she agrees. Karl begins an affair with Susan and Jenny falls for a colleague and she moves out.
19 November – 13 September 2007	Simon Burns	Sam Lee	Simon is a receptionist at Lassister's hotel. He is rude and dismissive to Elle Robinson when she and her party ask for the penthouse suite, but relents when she is firm with him. A recurring theme with Simon is easily distracted or fooled on several occasions when other characters need to get past security. Simon witnesses Paul Robinson and Rosetta Cammeniti kissing in the hotel's wine cellar. He later makes snide comments about Rebecca Napier, which she overhears.
