= Janelle Timmins =

- Neighbours character
- Portrayed by: Nell Feeney
- Duration: 2004–2007, 2015
- First appearance: 11 November 2004
- Last appearance: 11 March 2015
- Introduced by: Ric Pellizzeri (2004); Jason Herbison (2015)
In-universe information
- Occupation: Hairdresser; Lassiter's shareholder; Carpenter's Mechanics owner
- Brothers: Kevin Rebecchi
- Husband: Kim Timmins (until 2007); Allan Steiger (2007–)
- Sons: Dwayne Timmins; Brandon Timmins; Dylan Timmins; Scott Timmins
- Daughters: Janae Timmins; Anne Baxter
- Adoptive daughters: Bree Timmins
- Granddaughters: Kerry Mangel
- Nephews: Toadie Rebecchi

Janelle Steiger (also Timmins) is a fictional character from the Australian soap opera Neighbours, played by Nell Feeney. She made her first screen appearance on 11 November 2004. The character was written out and she departed on 13 July 2007. Feeney reprised her role as part of the show's 30th anniversary celebrations and returned for one episode on 11 March 2015.

== Development ==
=== Introduction and characterisation ===
Janelle was the second member of the Timmins family to be introduced. The serial's producer Peter Dodds told Inside Soap that the producers and writers thought it would be fun to bring in Stingray Timmins' (Ben Nicholas) mother. He called her "quite a character" and said she and Stingray have "an interesting relationship, which causes all sorts of problems." Janelle is also Kevin Rebecchi's (Don Bridges) younger sister. She has six children with her former husband Kim Timmins (Brett Swain). A writer for the show's official website stated, "Janelle will admit to manipulating men to get what she wants, she is fiercely proud of the fact that she has never been unfaithful to Kim." They described her as "a hard-as-nails bogan" and "a romantic". Janelle parks her trailer in the middle of Ramsay Street, which immediately causes tension with the neighbours. Janelle's portrayer, Nell Feeney, had previously appeared as Joanne Blair in 2003.

=== Departure ===
In December 2006, it was announced that the Neighbours producers had decided to write out the characters of Janelle and her on-screen daughter, Bree (Sianoa Smit-McPhee). They took the decision not to renew the contracts of Feeney and Smit-McPhee, following the departures of Nicholas and Damien Bodie (Dylan Timmins). Co-star Ian Smith (Harold Bishop) called the decision a "huge mistake". Janelle and Bree made their final appearances in July 2007.

=== Return ===
On 28 November 2014, it was announced that Feeney had reprised her role as part of Neighbours' 30th anniversary celebrations. Janelle returned to take part in the Erinsborough Festival's baking competition on 11 March 2015. Janelle gets in between the feuding Susan Kennedy (Jackie Woodburne) and Sheila Canning (Colette Mann), while her own rivalry with Susan also "reasserts itself." However, after the cakes are ruined, the judge chooses Karl Kennedy's (Alan Fletcher) trifle as the winner, which unites the women in anger. Janelle, Susan and Sheila then tie for the People's Choice Award.

== Storylines ==
Janelle comes to Ramsay Street to visit her son Stingray and nephew Toadfish Rebecchi (Ryan Moloney). Janelle wears a neck brace and explains that her car was rear-ended, so she needs Toadie's help to get compensation. Janelle asks Stingray to return to Colac with her to help look after her daughters Bree and Janae Timmins (Eliza Taylor-Cotter). Janelle befriends Lyn Scully (Janet Andrewartha), who gives her a key to her house. Toadie represents Janelle in court and she wins $5000 in damages. As she and Stingray are leaving, he changes his mind and Janelle allows him to stay in Ramsay Street. A few months later, Janelle returns and gets a job in the local hair salon. Janelle reconnects with her other son Dylan and her daughters arrive. Janelle, Lyn and Susan Kennedy have a fling with Bobby Hoyland (Andrew McFarlane). When they discover Bobby has been stringing them along, they get revenge by tying him to a chair in his underwear and berating him for his bad behaviour, before throwing him out without his clothes.

Janelle runs up huge amounts of debt when she get a new credit card. When a debt collector turns up, she and her daughters flee to Canberra. On their return, the children get jobs and Janelle sets up a courier service. She also writes a novel called The Bogan's Tipped Hair, about her experiences in Ramsay Street. The novel features several of her neighbours. Bree also helps her mother with the story and a publisher becomes interested in it. After Dylan is presumed dead in a plane crash, Kim arrives in Erinsborough. Janelle initially refuses to let Kim stay, but realises that her children need him. Dylan returns during his own memorial service. Janelle and Kim get back together and she proposes to him. The Bogan's Tipped Hair goes on sale and Janelle appears on the chat show Rove Live, where she admits that Bree really wrote the book.

When Bree has some DNA tested as part of a science project, Janelle learns that Kim is not Bree's biological father. In a bid to prove that she had not had an affair, she gets herself tested. The results show that she is not related to Bree either. Janelle and Kim learn that Bree was swapped at birth. Janelle discovers Kim has been selling pirate DVDs in order to pay for the wedding. On the day of the ceremony, the police turn up and Kim apologises to his wife before running out. Janelle decides to take the blame for Kim, and is given a fine. She is later sued for breach of copyright and is forced to accept that Kim will not be returning. Bree befriends a blind girl named Anne Baxter (Tessa James). Janelle is initially uncomfortable around her, but they soon bond. Anne later tells Janelle that she is her daughter.

When Bree asks to meet her biological parents, Anne leaves to talk to them first. She does not return and calls Janelle to say that her parents are taking her away. Kim's mother, Loris (Kate Fitzpatrick), buys Number 26 and stays with the family. Janelle has a brief relationship with Lou Carpenter (Tom Oliver). Loris later leaves to find Anne and signs over Number 26 and her share in Lassiter's to the family. Janelle begins dating Allan Steiger (Joe Clements). When Janelle's granddaughter Kerry (Claudine Henningsen) is diagnosed with leukemia, Stingray donates bone marrow to her. During Janelle's birthday celebrations, Stingray dies from an aneurysm. Kim returns for the funeral and Steiger asks him to take Dylan away to give him a chance to recover. Steiger later leaves for the Solomon Islands, promising to propose to Janelle on his return.

Both Steiger and Anne return to Erinsborough. Janelle meets Anne's father and tries to convince him into letting Anne stay. Steiger suggests that the Timmins family relocate to Cairns, so they will be closer to Anne, Kim and Dylan. On their last day in Ramsay Street, Steiger and Janelle get married. Her favourite singer Daryl Braithwaite gives a performance and the family, with the exception of Janae, leave in a helicopter.

Eight years later, Janelle returns to enter the Erinsborough Festival's baking competition. She catches up with Susan and her husband Karl. She mentions that Karl's erotic novel helped her marriage to Allan. Susan accidentally sneezes on Janelle's cake, ruling her out of the competition. Janelle tries to get her own back by throwing Susan's entry on the floor, but gets Sheila Canning's cake by mistake. The celebrity judge, Matt Preston, announces Karl as the winner, after all the other cakes are deemed unfit for judging. However, Janelle, Susan and Sheila tie for the People's Choice Award and the three women celebrate together. Janelle returns home to Cairns afterwards.

== Reception ==
In 2005, a writer for the BBC's Neighbours website said Janelle's arrival in her caravan was her most notable moment, but observed "with a woman like this, more notable moments will follow!" During a feature on her fantasy Neighbours cast, Inside Soap's Sarah Ellis chose Janelle as her choice for "madcap mum". She commented "Not everyone's a natural when it comes to being a mum - and we love to laugh at those who get it hopelessly wrong. 'Bogan' matriarch Janelle is in a league of her own." Roz Laws of the Sunday Mercury branded Janelle one of "the three witches of Erinsborough", along with Susan and Lyn, during the love triangle storyline.

John Mangan from The Age included Janelle in a feature about bogan women. Mangan wrote "Timmins matriarch Janelle is a battler who arrived in Erinsborough after raising five kids in a trailer park. She made good, even writing a novel about her life as a hairdresser, titled (after The Bride Stripped Bare), The Bogan's Tipped Hair. Larissa Dubecki from the same publication called Janelle a "wannabe trash novelist airhead". Dubecki later called Janelle an "arch bogan". A reporter for the Daily Record noted that "honesty isn't a word in her vocabulary". Janelle was placed at number twenty-six on the Huffpost's "35 greatest Neighbours characters of all time" feature. Journalist Adam Beresford described her a "much-missed character" who riled up her neighbours for three years and whose family were "true blue bogans". A Herald Sun reporter included Janelle's 2015 return in their "Neighbours' 30 most memorable moments" feature.
