= Susan Kennedy =

Fictional character from Neighbours

- Neighbours character
- Portrayed by: Jackie Woodburne; Rainey Mayo (1995 dream)
- Duration: 1994–2025
- First appearance: 3 October 1994
- Last appearance: 11 December 2025
- Introduced by: Stanley Walsh
- Spin-off appearances: Neighbours vs Zombies (2014); Summer Stories (2016); Neighbours vs Time Travel (2017)
In-universe information
- Other names: Susan Smith; Susan Kinski
- Occupation: Waitress; Teacher and principal at Erinsborough High; Journalist; Student at Eden University; Marriage celebrant
- Family: Kennedy
- Mother: Grace Smith
- Sisters: Carmel Tyler; Liz Conway
- Husband: Karl Kennedy (1978–2004, 2007–present); Alex Kinski (2005)
- Sons: Malcolm Kennedy; Billy Kennedy
- Daughters: Libby Kennedy
- Stepsons: Zeke Kinski
- Stepdaughters: Katya Kinski; Rachel Kinski; Holly Hoyland
- Grandsons: Jackson Kennedy; Ben Kirk
- Granddaughters: Susannah Kennedy
- Nephews: Darcy Tyler
- Nieces: Elly Conway; Bea Nilsson
- Other relatives: Aster Conway

Susan Kennedy (also Smith and Kinski) is a fictional character from the Australian soap opera Neighbours, played by Jackie Woodburne. The character and her family were created by storyliners in an attempt to bring the show back to its roots. Susan made her first screen appearance during the episode broadcast on 3 October 1994, debuting alongside her on-screen family. The storyliners made Susan a teacher at Erinsborough High to give her immediate links with other characters. Since her introduction, Susan's personality and appearance have been through several changes.

Her storylines have seen her begin a relationship with a priest, being married, divorced and widowed. Susan has become a stepmother and a grandmother and she has been central to three plots revolving around health issues – retrograde amnesia, multiple sclerosis and surrogacy. She has also been central to a cyber-bullying plot. In October 2007, Susan became the longest-running female character in the show's history, having been in Neighbours for thirteen years. Woodburne has garnered various award nominations for her portrayal of Susan and the character has been well received by viewers and television critics. Susan delivers a closing monologue in the serial's finale, which was lauded by critics for encompassing the ethos of Neighbours.

== Creation and casting ==
In 1994, the Neighbours storyliners decided to introduce a new "solid" family called the Kennedys. The family, which consisted of five members – a mother, father, two sons and a daughter – moved into Number 28 Ramsay Street. The storyliners felt that they needed to take the show back to its roots, as it seemed that all the houses on the street were populated with misfits and distant relatives. Alan Fletcher was cast in the role of Karl Kennedy and Benjamin McNair, Kym Valentine and Jesse Spencer were cast as teenagers Malcolm, Libby and Billy respectively. Woodburne was cast in the role of Susan, the matriarch of the family. The actress revealed that she only intended to play the part of Susan for twelve months, but she fell in love with the show and stayed. Actress Ailsa Piper was also considered for the role of Susan. She would later portray Ruth Wilkinson.

When asked if she remembered her first day of filming, Woodburne recalled "Yes - I remember it perfectly. We were unpacking stuff from the car and moving into No 28. I already knew Alan, but I didn't know the kids. It all just meshed, though, and we knew immediately what type of family we were going to be." Susan was given a teaching job at the local high school and Karl became the local GP, giving the family immediate links with other characters. In 1995, Rainey Mayo portrayed a teenage Susan in a daydream. In 2009, Woodburne celebrated fifteen years in the programme. Of her television milestone, Woodburne said, "It seems both bizarre and wonderful to me that I'm coming up to 15 years on the show, even though the world of Neighbours feels instinctive and familiar, I'm still challenged and rewarded by the work."

== Development ==
=== Characterisation ===
On her arrival, Susan was described as being "staid" and more open-minded than her husband, Karl. Woodburne told the Soap Show that Susan is a "good mum" who means well. Her children are her number one priority and she overcompensates for her husband's disciplinarian style. This has led to a Holy Soap writer describing Susan as "the mother hen of the street". Network Ten say that Susan is the "heart and soul of Erinsborough", with a good sense of humour and the skills of a ninja. Susan has been through a "rough ride". She has had to cope with Karl's infidelity, a divorce, her second husband dying hours after their wedding, being betrayed by her nephew and revealing that she killed her mother. TV Week said "But, through it all, Susan has often provided a home for people in trouble, including a number of the Timmins kids and the kids of her dead husband." This has made her one of the most "enigmatic and appealing characters" within the show.

Susan in her first episode (1994). The character had a longer hairstyle until 2004.

In 2004, Susan's appearance changed and she was seen having her long hair cut when she wanted a fresh start following a split from Karl. Woodburne has revealed that there is no chance of Susan growing her long hair back. She said "I could never grow it long again. I love the ease of having short hair. Back when it was long, I used to wash and dry my hair every morning at home before going into work. That added an extra half-hour to my day". She also added that the Neighbours' bosses at the time believed that women should have long hair. In April 2012, Susan debuted "a stylish new haircut" representing her single status.

Woodburne has said she never gets bored of playing Susan as she changes all the time. She added "One of the upsides of this job is that in a week you might be doing absolute slapstick comedy, you might be doing high drama/tragedy and in between maybe some nice subtle interesting stuff as well, the character keeps changing and evolving depending on who she is interacting with". Woodburne has said that her favourite storyline has been the Susan, Karl and Izzy love triangle. As Susan is normally a good person, it gave her a chance to have a character (Izzy) that she could hate. Woodburne added "It was good to play those much meaner, darker, angrier, cruel moments than always to be the kind character. It was good to see those dents in her armour I think".

Towards the end of 2009, a change occurred in Susan's personality while she acted as a surrogate mother for Libby and Daniel Fitzgerald (Brett Tucker). During clashes with Daniel, Susan was seen becoming controlling and bossy, which Woodburne found challenging to play. Woodburne said "As the story progressed it became apparent that we were going to have to go to the extremes of the less attractive qualities of our characters. We talked about it and decided to go for it – he would be the overbearing husband and Susan the mother-in-law from hell". Woodburne added that Susan is acting out of love for her daughter and for Libby's desire to have a child. In July 2011, Woodburne told a writer for Channel 5 that she still found the role of Susan challenging. She explained that she likes Susan because she adapts well and takes all the things that happen to her in her stride. Woodburne said Karl and Susan are now less naive and exuberant due to the things they have gone through. When asked what the future holds for her character, Woodburne stated "You know, I'm kind of with Susan. I like the Kennedy house when it's full of noisy kids, being naughty and creating havoc. I like it loud and messy. So that would be my hope, that we get a bit of that happening again."

=== Marriage to Karl Kennedy ===
Susan and Karl were childhood sweethearts who married in 1978, before they both graduated from university. Karl has cheated on Susan with Sarah Beaumont (Nicola Charles), and left her for Izzy Hoyland (Natalie Bassingthwaighte). The couple have broken up and divorced, but have later reunited and remarried. Woodburne has named the Karl, Susan and Izzy love triangle as one of her favourite storylines. Woodburne believes that Karl and Susan have a strong connection that is "based upon such a good grounding". Karl and Susan are best friends who enjoy each other's company, share a deep connection and take joy in each other's quirks and ways. Woodburne described them as having a "really solid foundation for a marriage" and she has said that she does not want to see Susan and Karl's relationship break up again. Holy Soap have called Susan and Karl "contenders for the friskiest couple on Ramsay Street". Following their "passionate arguments", the couple enjoy making up together. They have a healthy attraction for each other. Fletcher says he and Woodburne find the scenes "funny". Fletcher said "Karl and Susan every now and again do go through a phase where they become slightly more amorous than in their tougher times and tougher storylines – suffice to say it's not bawdy, but I think the audience will enjoy the fun aspect". Karl and Susan have been caught in the nude together on three occasions; at the beach, in Lou Carpenter's (Tom Oliver) spa and when they went skinny-dipping in the bush. When asked what makes Karl and Susan popular with viewers, Woodburne said "Because I think they're so flawed. There's two things: they make horrendous mistakes, both of them, but they both are coming from a place of well meaning. They're both wanting to try and do the right thing and be helpful, but so often they get it so terribly wrong, and I think we can all relate to that."

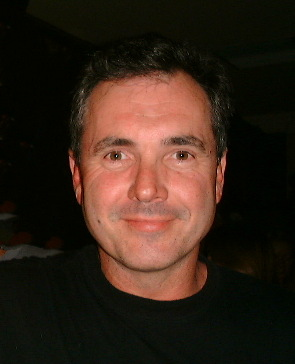
Alan Fletcher plays Susan's on screen husband, Karl Kennedy.

In May 2011, it was revealed that Susan and Karl's marriage would be run into trouble, when Susan becomes emotionally involved with another man. Susan strikes up a friendship with local builder, Jim Dolan (Scott Parmeter), as he fights cancer, causing problems between herself and Karl. When asked by Channel 5 about her reaction to the storyline, Woodburne said "I think it's a great story. Karl and Susan are both in their 50s; they've been married together; they've raised a bunch of kids; they’ve had careers and jobs. And to use the popular term 'empty nesters', that's what they’re looking at. For him he thinks, 'That's great, terrific! More time for us; we can travel.' But for her it's, 'Well, I don't know how to be that person. I know how to be this person, who's someone who's wrangling kids and busy doing things.' But her challenge I think is going to be to find out who she is as one half of a couple, as opposed to being the hub of a wheel." The actress revealed she and Fletcher were both worried about Susan and Karl breaking up and having to work with new people, but they believe any new development for the characters is good. Woodburne told Daniel Kilkelly of Digital Spy that she thought the new storyline was great and said any relationship which has been going for as long as the Kennedys' has, will have its "turbulent patches". Woodburne said Susan develops a very strong attachment to Jim because of her desire to help and be needed. When asked if she was worried about revisiting old ground with the storyline, Woodburne said the new conflict, which arises within Karl and Susan's relationship, is "very appropriate" for the time of their lives and where they are at.

Susan meets Jim at the hospital and remembers him from the work he did on Lyn Scully's (Janet Andrewartha) house. They get talking and Jim reveals he just had a melanoma removed and he is a bit "bewildered" by the hospital process and Susan helps him out. Jim's condition grows worse and he is diagnosed with terminal cancer. Susan learns he has no family and Woodburne said she instinctively wants to look after him. The actress said Susan crosses boundaries as she starts to neglect certain areas of her life, like her marriage. She tells Karl not to be selfish and that the situation is not about him or her, it is about Jim. Woodburne explained to Channel 5 that Karl's reaction to Susan's friendship with Jim changes and he starts thinking he should not be selfish. However, when he notices his wife becoming more involved with Jim and neglecting her responsibilities, Karl gets angry as she is not thinking about anything else. Susan and Karl's eldest son, Malcolm, returns to Erinsborough to help his parents work through their issues. Woodburne thought Malcolm was initially on Susan's side because he can see she is helping someone who is ill, but as he looks more closely he understands why his father is so upset with Susan's behavior. Susan is upset when she misses Jim's last moments and blames Karl. They begin rowing, which becomes worse due to Susan's grief. Karl and Susan decide to separate following a make-or-break holiday. Their decision leaves Malcolm devastated and he takes his anger out on his mother, but Karl then admits it was his decision to end the marriage.

=== Other relationships ===
Following Karl's affair with Sarah, Susan goes out to dinner with Martin Chester (Gil Tucker), a former boyfriend and member of Karl's university band. Woodburne told Annette Dasey of Inside Soap that Karl knows Martin is taking Susan to dinner and he does not think she would be capable of any "misconduct" with him. The actress explained "Susan is very attracted to Martin, but she wouldn't be aware of it if her marriage was more solid and she wasn't feeling so unloved." Woodburne stated that Susan is tempted to have a fling, but she ultimately decides that she wants to save her marriage. Despite Karl's affair, she still loves him and they need to work through their problems. Woodburne was good friends with Tucker as they previously worked together on Cop Shop.

In 2004, Susan became involved with Tom Scully (Andrew Larkins), a Priest. Susan and Tom caused a scandal when they began a relationship. Television critic Andrew Mercado said that 2004 went down as "a watershed year for controversy" after Susan had sex with Tom. Woodburne told Jackie Brygel from TV Week that it was a "very hot affair". Tom left the priesthood for Susan and she confessed her love for him. However, the relationship soon ended. Woodburne commented "It becomes apparent to both of them that it is just not meant to be. They both reach a period in their life when they are feeling low and lonely and aren't feeling very good about themselves. They just realise that there is no future." Tom returned in 2007 and he became Principal of Erinsborough High. He told Susan that he never stopped loving her and wanted her back. However, by then she was back with Karl.

Susan has a fling with Bobby Hoyland (Andrew McFarlane) in early 2005. Bobby turns out to be a womaniser after beginning relationships with both Janelle Timmins (Nell Feeney) and Lyn Scully. Fergus Shiel of The Age said Bobby provided an outlet for Janelle, Susan and Lyn's "extramarital desires." The women later get revenge on Bobby. That same year saw Susan meet widower Alex Kinski (Andrew Clarke) and his children. Alex and Susan soon begin a relationship. When Alex is diagnosed with terminal cancer, he and Susan marry, and he dies shortly after. Susan then takes custody of his children.

In 2008, Susan joined the Erinsborough News and became a journalist. She began working for Paul Robinson (Stefan Dennis). Susan and Paul are enemies, but they have a "grudging respect or interest in each other". Paul has a shady past and Karl does not trust Paul, so Susan uses her new job to wind Karl up. Susan works closely with Paul and his reputation with the ladies gives Woodburne the opportunity to bring Susan's sadistic side. Woodburne has said that she wishes for more of that storyline as she and Dennis found it "fun". She added that "There was a lot of conflict and comedy and it kind of ran its natural course over several weeks. She still works there so the potential for further stories is still there."

Following her split from Karl in 2012, Susan meets yoga teacher Bernard Cabello (Bruce Alexander) at a gym class.

=== Retrograde amnesia ===
In 2002, Susan developed retrograde amnesia. The storyline saw Susan slip on some spilt milk and sustain a minor head injury. After she goes to sleep, she wakes up and has lost three decades of her life. Woodburne told Inside Soap's Jason Herbison that Susan believes the year is 1972 and the night before was her sixteenth birthday, where she drank too much champagne. She does not recognise her house and thinks she passed out and ended up somewhere else. Susan's family take her to the hospital, where she is diagnosed with retrograde amnesia. Karl becomes determined to tell her the truth about her condition, while her nephew, Darcy (Mark Raffety), insists they treat her "with kid gloves." Woodburne revealed "Susan keeps asking when she's going to be allowed home to see her parents, and eventually Karl breaks the news - her parents are long dead and she's actually 45, not 16 as she believes. And on top of that, Karl is her husband!" Susan turns to her daughter Libby – who she believes is her sister Carmel (Kirsty Child) – for comfort. But when Libby confirms what Karl has told her, Susan leaves the hospital. Susan spots some students in Seventies clothes and she follows them to a Seventies themed party at Erinsborough High. However, the students recognise Susan as their principal, which distresses her. Susan ends up in the bathroom and she sees herself in the mirror for the first time since the accident, and is shocked to see a middle-aged woman staring back at her.

As she struggles with her condition, doctors suggest to Karl that going back to familiar surroundings may trigger the return of her memories. Susan is brought to Ramsay Street, but nothing happens. Woodburne stated that Susan hates her hair and her clothes and wants to change everything. Karl takes her to Lyn Scully's salon and manages to persuade her to have her hair styled rather than cut short. While she is at the salon, Susan remembers her high school sweetheart, Craig Benson (Tim Hughes), and decides to find him. Woodburne told Herbison "As far as she's concerned, Craig is her boyfriend and they're in love. So she looks him up in the phone book and sets off to find him." Woodburne added that there was a danger the storyline could cross a line and become silly, but the crew tried to portray the fear a person would feel when everything is suddenly unfamiliar. Susan falls in love with Karl and her memories return during their vow renewal service. During a 2012 interview, Woodburne told a What's on TV reporter that she and the writers initially joked about the storyline, but they found some truth in it. She explained "It was actually based on a story of a woman who lived in England. The same thing happened to her. She fell over in a supermarket. Between leaving the supermarket and getting home, she'd lost 30 years. I don't think she recovered. She had a husband and grown-up children and she had no idea who they were. Imagine the terror and the fear of being surrounded by these people who tell you that they are your family. But you feel nothing."

=== Multiple sclerosis ===
"As an actor, you want to make it authentic and respectful to people who suffer with MS, as it's a dreadful condition and certainly can be very diminishing to people."

— Woodburne on her research for the storyline (2012)

Susan was diagnosed with Multiple sclerosis in 2007. Two years prior, MS Australia pitched a storyline to the Neighbours team asking for a character to be diagnosed with MS and for them to then show the impact MS can have on a community. The society contacted a producer and discussed a possible storyline for a young character in her twenties who had a promising career and family ahead of her. In 2006, the society received a phone call from one of the writers who revealed that they had chosen to write an MS story into the show and they had selected Susan Kennedy to be the character that was going to be diagnosed. The society was initially disappointed, as Susan was older than the typical person diagnosed with the condition. However, they were pleased that a permanent character and not an extra was chosen. MS Australia attended a meeting with the Neighbours writers to help develop a realistic and true portrayal of the diagnosis, symptoms and treatments. On-screen Susan was seen displaying unusual symptoms, including black outs and loss of sight and sensation in her hands. She was then seen undergoing an MRI scan, before she was diagnosed with multiple sclerosis.

Woodburne was initially against Susan developing the condition, but when she started researching it, she realised how much of a challenge the storyline would be and she changed her mind. The actress and the shows writers worked closely with the MS Society to make the storyline as realistic as possible and it was praised by both the society and viewers who have the condition. Jenna Litchfield of the MS Society said soap opera storylines in which characters are diagnosed with MS helped to highlight the condition and its effects. She added that the storyline had "sparked interest." Of the storyline, Woodburne stated "It's a massive story and to take a character that has always been so strong and to challenge them physically and emotionally was terrific. I know that the writing department did an enormous amount of research." Woodburne also explained that as Susan is such a strong person mentally, she goes through an emotional struggle when her body lets her down. Woodburne commented that she found the scenes distressing to play as she is so attached to her character. She told a writer for Inside Soap that it was a difficult storyline, but "ultimately rewarding". On screen, Susan learnt how to keep her symptoms under control and Woodburne said she would occasionally have a relapse, as the condition does not go away. In 2011, Woodburne commented on the MS storyline, which she enjoyed, saying it was very challenging to tell a good story and make it authentic and real for people who have the condition.

In April 2012, Susan starts to struggle with her MS again, following her split from Karl and her promotion to editor of the Erinsborough News. Jackie Brygel of TV Week said Susan has a lot to prove with Paul breathing down her neck, but her new role puts her health in jeopardy when she begins displaying signs of an MS relapse. Woodburne explained "She's working 24 hours a day to try to get the paper to take on a different form and is running herself into the ground. She's unable to stop the trembling in her hand, is quite dizzy and her vision becomes blurred - all indications of an MS relapse, which would be her worst nightmare." Susan refuses to turn to Karl, who always helped her with an episode, and instead she relies on help from Rhys Lawson (Ben Barber). Woodburne revealed Karl asks Susan to slow down, but she ignores him. The actress said Karl is looking at the situation from the perspective of an ex-husband who has feelings for her, but also as a doctor. Susan finds herself unable to do the housework, but Rhys understands that she wants to keep her independence.

=== Surrogacy ===
In 2009, Susan was seen offering to become a surrogate for her daughter Libby. Following a fight with the hospital board, Susan became pregnant. However, this causes friction with her son-in-law. Following a fall, Susan loses the baby. Woodburne called the scenes "difficult" to film. Alan Fletcher said the storyline "could have been dreadful in the wrong hands", but he was pleased at the way the scenes were handled. He added "The notion of a mother being a surrogate for their daughter is something you can't pretend is not controversial. The writers embraced that and showed how Susan's decision divided the community, and has potential to divide the family". Neighbours' timeslot presented difficulties for the storyline. The writers were forced to tone the plot down to comply with guidelines. Woodburne said "Because of the time of day that our show is on—it's on at 6.30 here and day time in the UK—obviously doing something as controversial as surrogacy at that time slot we would be so restricted by censorship". The storyline received mixed reactions from viewers. Woodburne said that people believe Susan is "such a good mother and it's awesome she's prepared to do this for Libby and Dan". Other viewers have said that Susan should not have got involved and that the storyline was ridiculous as Susan is too old. Neighbours executive producer Susan Bower also spoke out about the storyline and said "I've had quite a few letters from people in England who'd heard about it before it was even in the papers in Australia saying they disagree and think it's shocking".

=== Cyber-bullying ===
Following the failed surrogacy, Susan decides to enroll on a media course at Eden Hills University. In June 2010, she begins receiving threats via text messages and emails, telling her to stay away from the university. She is later followed by an unseen person in a car. Susan later spots the car outside her house and she is very frightened. The cyber bully brings up some of Susan's personal issues within their threats and this make her feel vulnerable. They also make places that Susan has previously felt safe in, feel unsafe. Of this Woodburne said "To feel so vulnerable in your own neighbourhood would be just awful. I think I would be equally frightened". As Susan has multiple sclerosis, the stress has a big impact upon her health. Woodburne said that Susan is usually a very strong person mentally, but she feels out of control because the situation is distressing her. She becomes a victim. Susan tries to stand up to the bully and refuses to stay away from the university. However, when she arrives for her lesson, she receives another threatening message. This terrifies her and she locks herself in the toilets.

Eventually Susan learns her tutor, John Bradley (Laurence Brewer), is behind the threats. Susan had trusted John, so she is shocked to find that he is her bully. Of Susan's discovery, Woodburne said "It's so unexpected because it's somebody she believed to be of great integrity and someone who she thought was on her side". John, who is described as a "seriously unhinged individual", kidnaps Susan when she confronts him. He holds her captive and becomes very angry. He confesses to Susan that he is behind the threats. He tells her that in 1995, when Susan was a teacher at Erinsborough High, she gave him a bad report and he failed his teaching course. Susan is compassionate, but she does not let him get away with his crime and he is arrested. By standing up to him, Susan loses her anxiety.

== Storylines ==
When Susan's husband, Karl, is suspected of causing the death of a patient, he decides to move their family to Erinsborough for a fresh start. As Susan settles into Ramsay Street, she hopes to get back into teaching. Susan gets involved in the drama society and works at the Coffee Shop for Annalise Hartman (Kimberley Davies). Karl wants to have another child, but Susan is opposed to the idea. She later decides that she wants to return to teaching and is given a job at Erinsborough High. Susan chaperones Brett Stark (Brett Blewitt) on a trip to South Africa and she confesses to him that she helped her mother to die. Susan invites Billy's best friend, Toadfish Rebecchi (Ryan Moloney) to move in and he becomes a surrogate son after Malcolm leaves. Susan is offered the position of principal at a school in Wangaratta and she accepts, knowing that she will have to leave her family. After a few months, Susan is offered the job of principal at Erinsborough High. While Susan is away, Karl kisses his receptionist, Sarah Beaumont (Nicola Charles). Susan learns the truth about the kiss several months later from Billy and she confronts Karl. He admits to the kiss and Susan slaps him; she then throws him out. It takes months before Susan forgives Karl, but they work on trying to save their marriage by attending counselling. Susan and Libby befriend new neighbours Lyn and Stephanie Scully (Carla Bonner).

Libby is involved in a motorbike accident that leaves her with a small chance of carrying a baby to full term. Susan and Karl break the news to her. Libby later falls pregnant and gives birth to Susan and Karl's first grandchild, Ben (Noah Sutherland). Susan almost loses her job as principal when a student reports her for assault; however, the case is later dropped. Susan's nephew Darcy Tyler becomes partner in Karl's surgery and plots to sell the business to a clinic chain. Darcy tells Karl and Susan what he is doing, and Susan is furious with her nephew. Susan's sister, Liz (Christine Keogh), leaves her daughter Elly (Kendell Nunn) with the Kennedys for a brief time; Elly later joins her mother in Sweden. Susan slips on some spilt milk and wakes up with retrograde amnesia. She loses thirty years of her memory and believes she is sixteen and the year is 1972. Susan goes through months of counselling to try and regain her memory. During this time, she tells Karl that she does not like him and she goes missing when she tries to find an old boyfriend. Susan begins having flashbacks and starts to regain her memory. Libby's husband Drew Kirk (Dan Paris) dies and Susan finds it hard to comfort her daughter. Susan grows closer to Karl and he asks her to renew their vows. During the ceremony, Susan's memory returns.

Karl tells Susan that he no longer loves her after his drinking puts their marriage under strain. They separate, and Karl begins a relationship with Izzy Hoyland (Natalie Bassingthwaighte). Susan begins dating again and she falls for Lyn's brother-in-law, Tom Scully, a Catholic priest. Lyn and Libby are unhappy about the relationship and it eventually ends. Karl and Susan divorce, but they remain friends. Susan begins a relationship with Alex Kinski (Andrew Clarke) after he enrolls his children Rachel (Caitlin Stasey) and Zeke (Matthew Werkmeister) at Erinsborough High. Alex is diagnosed with Lymphoma and he asks Susan to marry him; she accepts. Alex's condition deteriorates and they decide to marry right away. The marriage is witnessed by Karl, Rachel, Zeke, and Alex's older daughter, Katya (Dichen Lachman). Alex passes away shortly after. Susan begins to fall for Karl again and she declares her love for him. They get back together in secret, but Rachel and Zeke find out the truth and believe that Susan did not love their father. They later give Karl and Susan their blessings. While Susan and Karl are on holiday in London, Karl proposes for a third time. Susan immediately accepts and they remarry on a boat on the Thames. The ceremony is interrupted when Izzy goes into labour and Karl delivers her daughter, Holly (Chaya Broadmore). Susan discovers that Karl is Holly's father and she tells him when they get back home.

During a period of ill health, Susan hits Bridget Parker (Eloise Mignon) with her car after passing out. Susan is unaware that she has struck Bridget and she leaves the scene. When she realises that she is responsible, Susan confesses and it causes a bitter feud between the Kennedys and the Parkers. However, during Susan's trial, Bridget remembers falling into the path of the car and that the collision was unavoidable. Soon afterwards, following a series of incorrect diagnoses, Susan is diagnosed with multiple sclerosis. Susan is shocked and scared, and Karl and Libby try to help her. Susan collapses at Toadie and Steph's wedding rehearsal and she goes to a multiple sclerosis retreat for professional help. Susan takes sick leave from the school and becomes a journalist for the Erinsborough News. After Libby is told she cannot have any more children, she and Dan decide to try surrogacy. Susan offers to be their surrogate, despite Karl's objections. Paul Robinson finds out about the surrogacy and writes a newspaper article about it, without knowing the identity of the family involved. When he finds out that Susan is the surrogate, he makes it public. The family face abuse and the hospital board decide to end the programme.

Libby and Dan protest against the decision and Susan tries blackmailing a senior board member. The board change their minds and Susan becomes pregnant. Dan finds it hard to relate to Susan and begins to question her part in his and Libby's lives. Karl books a holiday for them all to get away and talk. Dan and Susan argue about where the baby will be brought up and Dan says that he regrets agreeing to the surrogacy. When Dan goes for a walk, Susan follows him and they continue to argue. Dan walks away and Susan tries running after him, but she trips and falls. She calls out, but Dan does not hear her and he walks off. Libby and Karl find Susan and rush her to the hospital, where Susan miscarries. Susan attends the memorial for Libby and Dan's baby and during Dan's speech, she lashes out at him. As everyone leaves the park, Susan collapses and reveals that she cannot feel her legs. Susan has an MS relapse, but she recovers. Susan and Karl take up golf, and Susan also enrols in a media course at Eden Hills University. She begins receiving threats, which tell her to leave the university. Susan is deeply upset by the threats and her family worry that the stress will lead to an MS relapse.

Susan discovers her tutor, John Bradley, is behind the threats. When Susan asks John why he threatened her, he tells her she gave him a bad mark when he was a student teacher. Susan supports Libby when she learns that Steph had sex with Dan, and is carrying his child. Susan is angry with Toadie when she discovers he helped Steph cover up the lie. When Paul is pushed off the Lassiter's Hotel mezzanine, Susan begins investigating who is responsible, and makes Diana Marshall (Jane Badler) her prime suspect. Susan then receives text messages from an anonymous person, telling her that Diana was not the one who pushed Paul. Rebecca confesses to Susan that she pushed Paul and Kate Ramsay (Ashleigh Brewer) gave her a false alibi. Susan persuades Kate to go to the police. Susan is devastated when Ringo dies and she feels guilty because she was taking care of him for Prue (Penny Cook), Ringo's mother. When Lyn leaves town, Susan invites Summer Hoyland (Jordy Lucas) to stay. Karl tells Susan that he thinks they are heading in different directions and he worries that he is not enough for her. They make up and plan a holiday together.

Susan meets Jim Dolan at the hospital and she asks him to talk about the Patient Advocacy Program for a news article. Jim reveals that he has cancer and Susan supports him during his treatments. Malcolm comes to visit his parents and detects all is not well between them. Susan becomes worried when Jim does not answer her calls and Karl confesses that he asked Jim to keep his distance, which angers Susan. She accuses Karl of being jealous. Karl invites Jim over for lunch and he notices the map and leaflets for Peru. Jim works out Susan is delaying the holiday for him. He then collapses and Susan begs Karl to save him. Susan comforts Jim when he realises he is going to die and she tries to take him out of the hospital, so they can visit his childhood home, as promised. Karl stops her and when they step outside to talk, Jim dies. Susan is devastated and blames Karl for keeping her from Jim. She then leaves to arrange Jim's funeral. On her return, Susan and Karl announce that they are separating. Malcolm initially blames Susan for the split, but Karl confesses it was his idea. Karl tells Susan that he cannot be just friends with her and he looks for somewhere else to live. Susan starts a book group with Kate and Sonya Mitchell (Eve Morey).

Susan suspects Karl is having an affair with Jade Mitchell (Gemma Pranita), but is disappointed to learn that it was Malcolm. Karl and Susan get stuck in a storage shed and they reminisce about their past. They share a kiss goodbye and Susan goes to stay with Toadie and Sonya. Susan notices Audrey is not herself and she and Karl learn Audrey is dying. They care for her before she is put to sleep. When Karl goes to bury Audrey in the garden, Susan stops him and says she wants Audrey to be buried somewhere that she can visit often. They argue, but put aside their differences when Audrey's body, which was placed in an esky, is collected by a hard rubbish collector. Karl rescues the esky and he and Susan bury Audrey at Sonya's nursery. Susan soon finds an apartment to move into. Susan accompanies Karl to the funeral of an old friend and they share a drink together. Paul asks Susan to write a negative article about Ajay Kapoor (Sachin Joab) and the community centre plans, but she refuses. She later discovers Paul sabotaged Natasha Williams's (Valentina Novakovic) party by inviting gatecrashers to it, so he could continue his vendetta against Ajay and the police station merger. Susan tells Paul to publish a retraction or she will write an exposé.

Paul blackmails Susan into keeping quiet by threatening to fire Summer. However, Summer finds out what Paul has done and Susan reveals the truth in front of council members and the press. Paul stands down as editor and gives the job to Susan. Susan fires an employee when she discovers they have been spying for Paul and she takes on extra work. Karl expresses his concern for her health, but Susan reassures him she is fine. However, she has a relapse and is treated by Rhys. Susan attends a yoga class and befriends the teacher, Bernard Cabello. Bernard asks Susan out for a drink, but she declines. However, she changes her mind and asks Bernard to dinner instead. Susan invites Bernard to go and see Karl's band play at Charlie's. At the end of the night, Bernard shocks Susan by suddenly kissing her. Susan then tries to avoid Bernard and Vanessa Villante (Alin Sumarwata) tells him that Susan is not interested in dating him. Susan befriends Rhys's mother, Elaine (Sancia Robinson), but Rhys angrily tells Susan to stay away from Elaine. He later apologises. Susan goes to Montreal for a course, but returns home early to discover that Paul was planning to take back his job as editor.

Susan hires Bradley Fox (Aaron Jeffery) as deputy editor to take on some of her workload. She also begins attending a pole dancing class at the community centre. Susan becomes concerned when Bradley and Summer start dating, especially when they use the newspaper office for a late night hook-up. Susan checks Bradley's references and discovers that he has lied. She also learns that he was fired from his last job for dating his boss' daughter. Susan briefly falls out with Summer when she tries to warn her about Bradley. Susan's sister, Carmel, comes to visit and she develops feelings for Karl. Carmel makes sexual advances towards Karl, which he rejects. Susan is angry with Carmel, but eventually forgives her. Susan is shocked when she learns Paul has sold the Erinsborough News, without consulting her. Things become worse for Susan when she learns that Sarah Beaumont is overseeing the sale of the paper. Sarah apologises to Susan for everything that happened in the past, but Susan struggles to deal with her presence. When Karl tells her that he loves her, Susan rejects him. She later hands him divorce papers and confronts Sarah.

Karl admits to Susan that he and Sarah had sex all those years ago and she tells him that she already knew in her heart, Karl then signs the divorce papers. Susan realises that she does not want to get divorced and hurries to find Karl, before he can lodge the papers. Susan tracks him down and they forgive each other for their past mistakes, before kissing in the street. Susan then moves back into Number 28. After Priya is suspended from her job as principal of Erinsborough High, Susan is offered the job. She initially decides not to tell Priya about the offer, which causes them to briefly fall out. Susan helps Priya to get her job back by blackmailing Brian O'Loughlin (Paul Denny) into withdrawing his false accusations of harassment against her. Following Priya's death, Susan is again offered her job as principal and she accepts. Karl's daughter, Holly (Lucinda Armstrong Hall) comes to stay, while Izzy goes on a cruise with her new partner. Holly is initially rude to Susan, who becomes exasperated when Karl refuses to see that she is running rings around them. However, they later realise that Holly's issues are due to Izzy's abandonment of her. Karl asks Holly to stay with him and Susan, but Susan senses that Holly misses her mother and Karl takes her back to England.

When Susan suspects that Imogen Willis (Ariel Kaplan) might have an eating disorder, she raises the issue with Imogen's mother, Terese (Rebekah Elmaloglou), who dismisses her suspicions. Susan reopens the PirateNet radio station for the students, after Jack Lassiter (Alan Hopgood) donates money to the school. Susan has doubts about employing Gemma Reeves (Kathryn Beck), but Toadie persuades her to give his cousin a chance. Susan and Karl allow Rhiannon (Teressa Liane) and Jackson Bates (Finn Woodlock) to stay with them and Susan tries to help Rhiannon better herself. Susan has a relapse, but hides it from Karl as he is preoccupied by the local mayoral election. Susan confides in Kate instead. As the election heats up, Paul discovers Susan's MS relapse and reveals it to everyone, including Karl, during his campaign announcement, leaving Karl upset to why she did not confide in him. They soon make up, and Susan recovers from her relapse to support Karl through the election; however, Paul ultimately beats him to becoming mayor. When Georgia Brooks (Saskia Hampele) discovers she is pregnant, Susan supports her as she decides not to confide in her family and the baby's father Kyle Canning (Chris Milligan).

Zeke returns for a visit and he reveals that he is getting married. After the wedding, Susan decides to become a marriage celebrant. Following Kate's death, Susan, at Imogen's suggestion, organises a celebration of Kate's life at Lassiter's Lake. A grieving Paul forbids this and the memorial is held at the high school instead. Susan comforts Paul when he breaks down. Susan performs the vow renewal of Matt (Josef Brown) and Lauren Turner (Kate Kendall). Susan brings Holly back to Erinsborough for a visit to surprise Karl. Libby and Ben (now Felix Mallard) also return. When Susan falls ill, she asks Libby to become acting principal. Libby later realises that Karl and Susan have been trying to trick her into staying in Erinsborough, and they apologise. Susan reads an erotic novel written by "E. M. Williams", who has obvious knowledge of Ramsay Street. She discovers that Karl penned the book. Alex's nephew, Nate (Meyne Wyatt), moves in with Susan and Karl. Susan gets Nate to open up to her about his time in the army. When a tornado hits Erinsborough, Susan waits it out in Harold's Store with Lou Carpenter (Tom Oliver). When the roof collapses, Lou is trapped by a beam and he chokes on a piece of food. Guided by Karl over the phone, Susan performs an emergency tracheotomy on Lou. He makes a full recovery, but Susan is traumatised by the event and Nate helps counsel her through post-traumatic stress.

Malcolm visits his parents and informs them that Catherine is pregnant. He asks Susan and Karl to relocate to England and help him and Catherine out with the baby. Susan and Karl reminisce about their time on Ramsay Street and they decide to stay. Susan counsels Nate through his PTS, but she is affected by Nate's stories and becomes depressed herself. She seeks professional counselling at the hospital and tries to find Nate a qualified counsellor. She notices that Nate's progress has suffered and follows him out to the bush when he acts strangely. She falls in a hole he is digging as therapy and he nearly buries her alive, but sees her in time and rescues her. Susan falls out with Brad Willis (Kip Gamblin) when Karl accidentally drinks a chemical catalyst Brad was using in the Men's Shed. She questions Brad's commitment to teaching. Susan and Sheila are named judges for the Erinsborough Festival Bake-Off, but decide to enter the competition instead. They compete against Janelle Timmins (Nell Feeney), but after their bakes fall to the floor, Karl is declared the winner. After Karl learns Susan has a secret bank account, which contains her mad money, she dares him to spend big and he buys into the Off Air bar.

Susan is asked to act as a marriage celebrant for Coco Lee (Sophie Cheeseman), but she soon learns from Nate that Coco's fiancé, Alistair Hall (Nick Cain), kissed him. Susan refuses to perform the ceremony and Alistair makes a complaint against her, as he believes Susan told Coco about the kiss. He later drops the complaint. Karl and Susan take in Tyler Brennan (Travis Burns), while Ben comes to stay when Libby goes overseas for work. Susan supports Terese when she and Brad separate due to his affair with Lauren. They briefly fall out when Terese asks Susan to pick a side. Paul informs Susan that Erinsborough High and its grounds are being sold to Eden Hills Grammar. She later learns that she will not be kept on as principal and contemplates retirement. She and Brad then team up to save the school, organising a sleep-out in protest to the council's plans. A fire breaks out, trapping Susan with a heavily pregnant Amber Turner (Jenna Rosenow), who goes into labour. They are eventually rescued by the fire fighters. After seeing how upset Susan is about the school, Ben confesses to starting the fire. Susan later learns that the school has been saved.

Susan hires Finn Kelly (Rob Mills), following Brad's departure. Susan learns that Elly and Finn used to date. Susan collapses and is taken to hospital, where it is discovered that she has a high level of opiates in her system. It emerges that her vitamins have been swapped and Elly suspects that Finn was responsible. Finn is appointed acting principal while Susan recovers. When Finn's crimes are exposed, including the vitamin swap, Susan ignores her MS symptoms to return to the school to undo everything Finn implemented. Susan has a relapse and falls in the school yard. Karl persuades her to take sick leave and go to a retreat in Thailand. When they return, Susan is angry with Karl and later reveals that he tried to bring seeds and a Durian into the country, but was stopped at customs because of the smell, which he blamed on her soiling herself. Susan and Dipi Rebecchi (Sharon Johal) become suspicious of their husbands' appointments with Courtney Grixti (Emma Lane), and suspect they are paying for sex, but Susan learns that Karl is getting a massage and emotional therapy. Susan has to expel Ben, after he takes the blame for a school prank, which Yashvi Rebecchi (Olivia Junkeer) carried out.

Susan accidentally strikes Izzy with her car upon Izzy and Holly's return to Erinsborough. Izzy explains that she has been left a large amount of money by her late husband, and offers to fund a new hospital wing on Karl's behalf. She then asks Karl to father another child with her, which he briefly considers. Susan admits to Elly that Karl could be tempted by the chance of having another child, but she hopes he will put their marriage first. Karl turns down Izzy's request, so she steals his sperm from the hospital. After a negative pregnancy test, and a failed attempt at seducing Karl, Izzy leaves Holly with the Kennedys as she departs. Holly is later accepted on an exchange program to China, and Karl thinks Susan organised it to punish him. When Karl cuts himself, he tells Susan that he has to get to the hospital, as he is on blood thinners for DVT. While attending Erinsborough High's leadership camp, Susan and Kirsha Rebecchi (Vani Dhir) become lost in the bush after they lose their group during a walk. They spend the night in the bush and are eventually rescued, but Karl has a pulmonary embolism while looking for them and is rushed to hospital. Susan is told to prepare for the worst, but Karl recovers.

Susan's niece Bea Nilsson (Bonnie Anderson) comes to Erinsborough. Susan is accepted onto an MS drug trial, which Karl is overseeing, but the trial is soon shut down when some of his results from other projects appear to have been amended. Elly is accused of hitting Xanthe Canning (Lilly Van der Meer) with her car, and Karl and Susan pay her police bail. When Yashvi reveals that Bea is eloping with her fiancé, Patrick, Susan and Elly set out to find her, and come face to face with Finn. They discover that he got the MS trial shut down and struck Xanthe with Elly's car. Finn locks the women in a shipping container and leaves them to die. Karl and Mark Brennan (Scott McGregor) eventually find and free them. Bea moves into Number 28 and Susan invites her sister Liz (now played by Debra Lawrance) down to assist with Bea and Elly's issues. Bea believes that Elly wanted her to leave when they were teenagers, forcing her to spend some years on the streets. Liz admits that it was she who wanted Bea gone, as she reminded her too much of Bea's father. Liz and Susan's relationship is also strained. After pretending that she was robbed by Finn, Liz decides to returns to Sydney and Susan goes with her to help out.

Karl and Susan attempt to find Karl's half-sister Jemima Davies-Smythe (Magda Szubanski), but have no luck. Upon returning to Erinsborough for Aaron Brennan (Matt Wilson) and David Tanaka's (Takaya Honda) wedding, Susan learns that a miscommunication means she has been replaced as their celebrant. The replacement turns out to be Karl's sister Jemima, who he invites to stay with them. Susan believes Jemima is a gold digger, leading to conflict between them. When Jemima attempts to redecorate the house, Susan asks her to leave and Jemima admits that she is a millionaire. She offers to support Karl and Susan financially, but they turn down her offer and convince Jemima to reconcile with her children. After learning that Bea has gone to a cabin in the bush to find Finn, Susan, Elly and Xanthe set out to find her. They are all confronted by Finn, who is pushed off a cliff and left in a coma. The women agree to keep what happened a secret, but Susan begins seeing visions of Finn. After learning that he placed hydrogen cyanide canisters in the school with the intention of killing everything at the graduation ceremony, she comes close to smothering him with a pillow. Susan confesses to pushing Finn off the cliff, and is charged with attempted murder. The Department of Education removes Susan from her position at the school, and overturns her decision to appoint Elly as acting principal. Jane Harris (Annie Jones) is installed in her place. Susan is later cleared of her attempted murder charges. When Malcolm returns in 2022, Susan is stunned to see that he is now dating Izzy. Susan refuses to accept their relationship, so Malcolm chooses Izzy over her mother. However, when Izzy cheats on Malcolm, they break up and Izzy apologises to the Kennedys, explaining that she returned to get their acceptance, so she could be redeemed. Susan reluctantly accepts her apology. Susan is later stunned to learn that every other person on Ramsay Street is selling their houses. However, one by one, her neighbours decide to stay on the street and Susan afficiates at Toadie's wedding, then attends their reception on Ramsay Street. Susan reflects on her time on the street in the Ramsay Street History Book and watches her neighbours with Karl at her side.

In the 2025 final the whole street including past and present residents are now looking for a new home with the news that a freeway is being built through Ramsey Street. Paul Robinson and Shane Ramsey each come up with a new place Ramsey Hills and Robinson Towers. Before the closing scene Susan, Karl and Paul are stood on Ramsey Street where Susan says she wants to fight to save the street with Karl agreeing and Paul asking “what now” ending leaving it unknown what the outcome will be.

== Reception ==
=== Accolades ===
Woodburne has earned various award nominations for her role as Susan. In 2005, she was nominated for Best Female Performance in a Soap from the Rose d'Or Awards. At the 2007 Inside Soap Awards, Woodburne was nominated for Best Actress, Best Couple (with Alan Fletcher) and Best Storyline for Susan and Karl's wedding. The following year, Woodburne was again nominated for Best Actress, Best Couple and Best Storyline for Susan's MS diagnosis. 2009 saw Woodburne again nominated for Best Actress, she was also nominated alongside Fletcher, Valentine, Stasey and Werkmeister for Best Family.

In 2010, Woodburne received her first nomination for Best Daytime Star at the Inside Soap Awards. She was nominated in the same category in 2011 and 2012, before she won the award in 2015. Woodburne was nominated for Best Daytime Star again at the 2018 awards.

At the first Digital Spy Soap Awards ceremony, Woodburne was nominated for Most Popular Actress. She and Fletcher were also nominated for Best On-Screen Partnership and their 2007 storyline in London was nominated for Storyline of the Year. In 2025, Susan and Karl received a "Best Soap Couple" nomination at the Digital Spy Reader Awards. In 2010, the surrogacy storyline was nominated for best Baby Drama at the All About Soap Awards. Woodburne has been nominated for the TV Tonight Award for Most Underrated Performer seven times, and won in 2007, 2011 and 2012.

=== Critical response ===
During a feature on fictional television teachers, Susan was praised by teaching website TES Connect. Along with Will Schuester from American television show Glee, TES said that there are some teachers on television who manage to portray "convincing representations of the highs and lows of the job". They also added "Susan Kennedy from Neighbours manages to be the comforting mother figure as well as coming down hard when necessary". The Times named Susan's amnesia storyline as one of their top 15 most memorable Neighbours moments. They said "She slipped on milk, bumped her head and thought she was 16 again. Her failure to understand why she was living with a family on Ramsay Street lasted nearly a year". Television channel Five's Holy Soap website also named the storyline as Susan's most memorable moment, calling it "classic viewing". In 2022, a reporter from The Scotsman included Susan amnesia story as one of the show's top five moments from its entire history.

Kate Randall from Heat included Susan and Karl in the magazine's top ten Neighbours characters of all time feature. Susan and Karl were placed at joint second place on the Huffpost's "35 greatest Neighbours characters of all time" feature. Journalist Adam Beresford described her as a "respected principal" who "exudes calm authority". He believed that Susan and Karl were a "dream team" and "the bedrock of Ramsay Street". He assessed that the Kennedy's were a "a solid, dependable family unit" until Karl's affairs. He was also certain that "whatever life throws at them, Karl and Susan will make it." Susan was placed third in a poll ran via soap fansite "Back To The Bay", which asked readers to determine the top ten most popular Neighbours characters. In a feature profiling the "top 12 iconic Neighbours characters", critic Sheena McGinley of the Irish Independent placed Susan at number four in the list. McGinley described her as "long-suffering, dutiful Susan. Soothing Susan." She added that Susan has the "steadfast, wise presence" that will eternally be a prerequisite in society. Lorna White from Yours profiled the magazine's "favourite Neighbours characters of all time". Susan was included in the list and White said it "no surprise she's seen her fair share of storylines" given her longevity.

TV Scoop praised Woodburne's performance during the MS storyline. They said, "Susan's real life alter ego, Jackie Woodburne got to show off her excellent acting. As Susan's vision went, and later as she was put into the MRI scanner, Woodburne portrayed real fear and panic". TV Week named Susan as their third "Top Aussie TV Mum". They said "strong-spirited Susan has always doted on her kids, even while putting up with cheating hubby Karl (Alan Fletcher). The modern mum has seen it all, and still comes up smiling. In 2010, Susan was voted the third "Most Popular TV Mum" in a survey carried out by Yahoo!. Susan was placed seventh in a similar survey carried out by Vouchercodes.co.uk, to find "Britain's favourite television mother". They said "viewers identified with love for her family". In April 2010, Sky included Susan in their feature on the twenty-five most memorable Neighbours characters. They stated,

"Kindly but strong matriarch Susan may not be the most medically robust woman (amnesia, multiple sclerosis, frequent questionable haircuts), but she gets by thanks to her family. She's so devoted, in fact, that after Malcolm, Billy and Libby (sort of) flew the nest, she went and inherited Zeke and Rachel from second husband Alex. Despite her big heart, she can be counted on to get fierce with anyone who tries to upset the Ramsay Street balance – her frequent fights with Izzy in the middle of the street over Karl cemented her reputation as everyone's favourite soap mum."

Alan Fletcher has written a song dedicated to his screen wife titled "I've Got a Crush on Susie K". Bree Hoskin writing for LGBT website Gaydar said the one good thing to come of Izzy's scheming was Susan finally had her hair cut in an attempt to move on with her life. Sarah Ellis of Inside Soap said that Susan and Karl are Neighbours' version of Deirdre and Ken Barlow from Coronation Street. Ellis added that they are bound to get back together in the end. After the Neighbours finale was broadcast, Daniel Kilkelly of Digital Spy said that Woodburne "stole as the show as Susan Kennedy" and called her "arguably the most beloved of all the current Neighbours stars". Writing for Radio Times, Helen Daly referred to Susan's closing monologue as her "crowning moment". Referring to Susan as the "heart" of Neighbours, Daly described how "beloved Susan held all the values that Erinsborough put on a pedestal. She was kind, thoughtful... everything you'd want your own neighbour to be. If anyone could reflect on the history of the show, it's Susan." Daly further praised the monologue's references to the legacy of Neighbours' past, the images of deceased characters it introduced, and its apparent homage to UK viewers.
