= Mallboy =

2001 film by Vincent Giarrusso

- DVD cover
- Directed by: Vincent Giarrusso
- Written by: Vincent Giarrusso
- Produced by: Fiona Eagger
- Starring: Kane McNay; Nell Feeney
- Cinematography: Brendan Lavelle
- Edited by: Mark Atkin
- Release date: 25 January 2001
- Country: Australia
- Language: English
- Box office: A$140,742 (Australia)

Mallboy is an Australian film released in 2001, written and directed by Vincent Giarrusso, which depicts the difficulties faced by an adolescent trying to grow up in a community plagued by social problems. The film is set in and around the Northland Shopping Centre in Preston, Victoria.

== Plot ==
Shaun is a fourteen-year-old boy who prefers to spend time with his friends at a shopping centre in suburban Melbourne, rather than attending school. Demoralised in life with unsupportive friends, an out of touch and patronising social worker, arguments with his mother and his father having been convicted for burglary, he finds that there is little reason to be optimistic in life.

Shaun's life slowly begins to change for the better when his father is released from gaol. Hoping that they can now pursue a meaningful relationship, he is disappointed when he finds his father is not reciprocal. Ironically having once seen his father as a positive role model, Shaun eventually resolves to avoid the life his father has lived on overcoming his initial distress and feelings of rejection. Not long after his teenage sister gives birth, he decides, with the support from his mother, to leave his family and friends behind to start a new life in a hostel for disadvantaged adolescents.

== Cast ==
- Kane McNay as Shaun
- Nell Feeney as Jenny
- Brett Tucker as Darren
- Brett Swain as Shaun's father, Sam
- Sheryl Munks as Pam
- Vincent Gil as Mad Frank
- Georgina Naidu as Helen
- Jo Kennedy as Janice
- Victoria Eagger as Yvonne
- Damien Richardson as Security guard

== Response ==
Unlike Australian comedies, Mallboy is a film which depicts (some) bogans in a serious manner. A scene includes Shaun's mother holding his father's welcome back party and getting high on amphetamines, after which she starts a fight with his father's new girlfriend. Various other scenes also include drug use, fighting and confrontational swearing.

== Box office ==
Mallboy grossed $140,742 at the box office in Australia.

== See also ==
- Cinema of Australia
