= Brett Swain (actor) =

Australian actor and comedian

- Born: Australia
- Occupations: Actor; Comedian; Director; Writer
- Years active: 1987–current
- Television: Neighbours; Janus; SeaChange; Fergus McPhail

Brett Swain is an Australian actor and comedian.

== Early life ==
Swain started his career in entertainment at Dracula's Cabaret in mid-1980s performing sketches, singing and dancing, as well as playing guitar and drums.

== Career ==
=== Television ===
From 1994 to 1995 Swain had a regular role, playing Mal Hennessey in critically acclaimed and award-winning legal drama series Janus (known as Criminal Justice internationally). He also had a regular role as Griff in the first three seasons of SeaChange, from 1998 to 2000.

Swain landed the role of Kim Timmins on the Australian soap opera Neighbours, making his first appearance on 31 October 2005. The character was the Timmins family patriarch and was introduced after the arrival of his wife and four of their children the previous year. Nell Feeney and Damien Bodie, played his on-screen wife Janelle and son Dylan, respectively. Swain had previously made guest appearances in the series, including as John Swan, the duck hunter who killed Kerry Bishop (Linda Hartley-Clark) in 1990, as builder Buzz Wade in 1991, and as a horse racing commentator in 1993.

Other television credits include 2004 children's comedy series Fergus McPhail, as the title character's father, Don McPhail, and in 2008, a role in the first original installment of Nine Network's true crime series Underbelly, as Tibor Cassadae.

From 2011 to 2012 Swain played the recurring role of Prison Officer Griffiths, opposite David Wenham in drama miniseries Killing Time.

=== Film ===
Swain's film credits include Mick Molloy’s comedy films Crackerjack (2002), in which he played the marijuana growing greenkeeper and Bad Eggs (2003), playing the role of Pendlebury.

Swain played Sam, the main character Shaun's father in 2001 coming-of-age drama Mallboy and played the role of Kenny Yallop in the 2003 film Take Away. He also had a small role as a police officer in 2007 fantasy suspense film Ghost Rider, starring Nicolas Cage.

In 2014 Swain appeared in thriller feature Cut Snake, opposite Sullivan Stapleton.

=== Stage ===
On stage Swain has played Riff Raff in the Melbourne production of The Rocky Horror Show at the Regent Theatre, and cricketer Terry Jenner in Eddie Perfect’s show Shane Warne: The Musical.

== Personal life ==
During his time playing Kim Timmins in Neighbours, Swain was the real life partner of fellow Neighbours actress Marcella Russo, who played Liljana Bishop.

== Acting credits ==
=== Television ===
Year	Title	Role	Type	Ref.
1988	Mission: Impossible	Passport Officer	1 episode	
1990	Neighbours	John Swan	2 episodes	
1991	Neighbours	Builder (uncredited)	1 episode	
1991–1992	Kelly	Bert / Ronnie	2 episodes	
1992	Chances	Jared	1 episode	
1992	Phoenix	Tattoo	1 episode	
1992	Neighbours	Buzz Wade	6 episodes	
1993	Neighbours	Horse racing commentator	2 episodes	
1993	Neighbours	Painter	1 episode	
1994	Snowy River: The McGregor Saga	Surveyor 1	1 episode	
1994–1995	Janus	Mal Hennessey	16 episodes	
1994–2002	Blue Heelers	Zac Gillespie / Bruce Searle / Sen Det Halliday / Det Sen Sgt Walsh / Peter Sutcliffe	5 episodes	
1997	Good Guys, Bad Guys	Baxter	2 episodes	
1997	Raw FM	Robert Mills	1 episode	
1997	Halifax f.p.	Lauper	1 episode	
1998	Wildside	Sean O'Connor	1 episode	
1998	State Coroner	Ray Scullin	2 episodes	
1998	Driven Crazy	Fred	1 episode	
1998–2000	SeaChange	Griff	Seasons 1–3, 23 episodes	
1998–2003	Stingers	Kaiser Vincent / Roddy Green / Billy Rose	3 episodes	
1999	Harry’s War	Sgt Dawson	TV movie	
2001	The Micallef P(r)ogram(me)	Overexplaining Burglar	1 episode	
2002	Short Cuts	Glenn	1 episode	
2002	Marshall Law	Malcolm	1 episode	
2003	Welcher & Welcher	Pastor Malcolm Crabbe	Miniseries, 1 episode	
2004	Fergus McPhail	Don McPhail (Dad)	26 episodes	
2005	Last Man Standing	Bret	1 episode	
2005–2007	Neighbours	Kim Timmins	Regular role	
2008	Underbelly	Tibor 'Goose' Cassadae	4 episodes	
2008	The Hollowmen	Talkback Caller	2 episodes	
2009	Dirt Game	Trev	Miniseries, 2 episodes	
2010	City Homicide	Mick Conlon	1 episode	
2011	Sea Patrol	Carl Buckland	1 episode	
2011–2012	Killing Time	Prison Officer Griffiths	Miniseries, 3 episodes	
2011	Rush	Mr Osbourne	1 episode	
2013	Wentworth	Max Henderson	1 episode	
2013	Miss Fisher’s Murder Mysteries	Arthur Briggs	1 episode	
2014	INXS: Never Tear Us Apart	Dez Jose	Miniseries, 2 episodes	
2014	Winners & Losers	Roy Grbowski	2 episodes	
2017	The Warriors	Hutton	1 episode	
2017	Sisters	Norm	Miniseries, 1 episode	
2019	Utopia	Defence Official	1 episode	
2020	Halifax: Retribution	Security Guard	Miniseries, 1 episode	
2021	Superwog	Council Worker #1	1 episode	
2021	Spreadsheet	Peter Cook	1 episode	

=== Film ===
Year	Title	Role	Type	Ref.
1987	Australian Dream	Cop 2	Feature film	
1996	The Big Maybe	Joe Darabont	Short film	
1999	Black Box		Feature film	
1999	Naked Intent		Short film	
2001	Mallboy	Sam	Feature film	
2002	Shackleton's Antarctic Adventure	Frank Hurley (voice)	Short film	
2002	Crackerjack	Greenkeeper	Feature film	
2003	Bad Eggs	Security Officer Bartlett	Feature film	
2003	Take Away	Kenny Yallop	Feature film	
2003	The Cadet	The Editor	Short film	
2003	Creative Violence	Warne	Short film	
2004	Swimming to the Boy	Dad	Short film	
2005	You and Your Stupid Mate	The Supervisor	Feature film	
2006	All's Swell That Ends Swell	Gerry	Short film	
2006	Five Moments of Infidelity	Bob / Husband	Anthology film (segment 5)	
2007	Ghost Rider	Police Officer	Feature film	
2007	Work in Progress	Father	Short film	
2007	A Different Cut	Don	Short film	
2008	Tea and Physics	Kevin Kunning	Short film	
2008	Skinned	Father	Short film	
2009	Fences	Dean	Short film	
2010	Pinion	Father	Short film	
2010	Unearthed	Mr Morris	Short film	
2010	The Meeting	Mr Weyland	Short film	
2010	Meat Your Maker	Sam	Short film	
2011	Quinkin	Vox	Short film	
2011	Husband, Father, Son		Short film	
2012	Human Fog	Billy Dunlop	Short film	
2012	Mother's Day	Daniel	Short film	
2012	Snapshot		Short film	
2013	Adoption	Grey's Anatomy	Short film	
2014	Cut Snake	Boss	Feature film	
2014	Slow Cooker	Truck Driver	Short film	
2014	Alien	Iona's Dad	Short film	
2014	Groomless Bride	Kevin	Short film	
2016	Partner in Crime	Sergeant Baker	Short film	
2016	Copycat from Ballarat	Brian	Short film	
2016	Ok	Tom's Dad	Short film	
2018	New Dawn	Lance Hurley	Feature film	
2019	Last Graveyard Shift	Barry the Ghost	Short film	
2020	After the End	One Eye	Feature film	
2022	Wog Boys Forever	Rusty Nail	Feature film	
2025	Average Bloke	Frank Conway	Feature film	
2025	Yesterday's Hero		Post-production	
TBA	Everybody Hurts	Doctor	Completed	
TBA	Day Forty Five	Bryan Morewell	In production	

=== Stage ===
Year	Title	Role	Type	Ref.
1999	Stage Write '99: Head on Collision	Tom	West Melbourne Gasworks	
2004	The Rocky Horror Show	Riff Raff	Regent Theatre, Melbourne (Neighbours concert celebration)	
2007	Mojo	Mickey	Chapel Loft, Melbourne	
2009	Dead River		The Store Room for Melbourne Fringe Festival	
2008–2009	Shane Warne: The Musical	Terry Jenner	Melbourne Athenaeum, Regal Theatre, Perth, Enmore Theatre, Sydney	

== Writing / directing credits ==
=== Film ===
Year	Title	Role	Type	Ref.
2007	Opportunity Knocks	Writer / director	Short film	
2009	Royboys	Producer / Director / Writer / Director of Photography / Executive Producer	Documentary short	
