= When Good Ghouls Go Bad =

2001 television film

- Promotional poster
- Created by: R. L. Stine
- Screenplay by: Patrick Read Johnson; John Lau
- Directed by: Patrick Read Johnson
- Starring: Christopher Lloyd; Tom Amandes; Roy Billing
- Music by: Christopher Gordon
- Countries of origin: Australia; United States
- Original language: English

Production
- Producer: Steven R. McGlothen
- Cinematography: Brian J. Breheny
- Editor: Robert Gibson
- Running time: 93 minutes
- Production companies: Parachute Entertainment; Moonwatcher Inc.

Original release
- Network: Fox Family
- Release: October 21, 2001

When Good Ghouls Go Bad is a 2001 Fox Family television film directed by Patrick Read Johnson, commissioned for the network's 13 Nights of Halloween program block. Based upon a concept by R. L. Stine, the film's screenplay was written by Johnson and John Lau. Stine then wrote a full novelization of the film as a tie-in. It stars Christopher Lloyd.

== Plot ==
The story is set in the fictional town of Walker Falls, Minnesota, during the Halloween season.

Danny Walker and his father, James, recently divorced, have just moved to the town of Walker Falls from Chicago. James plans to fulfill his dream of re-opening the family chocolate factory. Both father and son are staying with James' father, known by all as "Uncle Fred". Danny dislikes his new life in Walker Falls after finding it difficult to fit in with his new peers.

Danny is surprised by how few decorations are up with Halloween only a week away. The people of Walker Falls do not seem to be making any effort at all to celebrate the holiday. When walking home from school, a pair of bullies escort Danny into a cemetery and to a heavily secured mausoleum and tell him that Walker Falls does not celebrate Halloween because of the legend of a curse placed on the town by Curtis Danko. Saying that if the town ever celebrated another Halloween, he would come back and destroy them all. The town secured both Dankos corpse and his final work of art, a statue so hideous and terrifying it would drive any who looked upon it to madness, in the mausoleum.

Meanwhile, Danny's Father is busy attempting to woo investors to the towns chocolate factory that had previously closed around the same time as the curse was placed. In a meeting at the town hall, he announces a "Halloween Spooktacular" celebration for their arrival. The plan causes much consternation among the superstitious attendees, with most vowing to not participate with the celebration.

The following day, the town awakes in shock as it has been fully decorated in Halloween garb, with a towering pile of pumpkins at the town square as a centerpiece. Uncle Fred, embracing the whimsy of it, pulls a pumpkin from the pile, causing an avalanche that crashes down upon him, ending his life.

After the funeral, Danny returns home to find the house bedecked in various toys and gizmos with music heard across the home. A further surprise had as Danny finds Uncle Fred wandering around in undeath. After briefly freaking out, Uncle Fred takes the new opportunity to terrorize Mike Kankel, father to one of the bullies, losing one of his hands in the process as a window closes on it.

After heading out to retrieve it, Danny attempts to break the news to his father that Uncle Fred is still alive, however he is not believed. Local girl Dayna does end up believing Danny and heads out with him to help Uncle Fred get back home with all his parts. Soon after it is discovered that the hand was busy and had stolen the keys to Dankos mausoleum, and that more and more of the towns former residents were rising from the graves. Gathering all the adults, including Uncle Fred, they are forced to enter Curtis Dankos old home where the towns children are already gathered having decided to celebrate Halloween secretly.

The towns residents are terrified to see Curtis Danko's corpse slowly moving down the steps to the center of the room, where his statue sits covered in a thick cloth. As Danko tears it off, the town gasps and looks away. When their curiosity gets the better of them, they look upon it and learn that the statue is not what was claimed, and instead was of Uncle Fred. A celebration of his contributions to the schools arts programs. It is revealed that Mike Kankel had locked Danko in the Kiln overnight as a prank, returning the next morning to discover an inattentive janitor had accidentally activated the Kiln in the meantime, burning Danko to death. When he saw the statue, he grew jealous of it, and created the legend to hide his culpability and allow his statue to shine in the spotlight instead.

After they leave, Curtis applauds Uncle Fred, and the zombies and the townspeople join in to applaud Curtis' statue. With everything settled, Curtis has accomplished what he's done and bids farewell to the town, disappearing into the night and returning to his crypt to finally rest. Meanwhile, the other zombies bid farewell. Uncle Fred reconciles with James then leaves with his wife, and join the other zombies, sharing one final dance with the fireflies, as all the entities slowly disappear dancing into the night. Danny and Dayna share a kiss, while James and Taylor hold hands as they watch the dancing zombies fade into the night. The town decides to celebrate Halloween once again.

== Cast ==
- Joe Pichler as Danny Walker
- Tom Amandes as James Walker
- Christopher Lloyd as 'Uncle' Fred Walker
- Joe Clements as Coach Mike Kankel
- Imelda Corcoran as Nurse Taylor Morgan
- Craig Marriott as Ryan Kankel
- Daniel Karr as Leo
- Brittany Byrnes as Dayna Stenson
- Brendan McCarthy as Curtis Danko
- Roy Billing as Mayor Bob Churney
- Alan Flower as Sheriff Ed Fraley
- Louise Fox as Miss Vanderspool
- Gordon Boyd as Pops Kankel
- Jenny Dibley as Dolores
- Rhonda Doyle as Mrs Churney

== Production ==
The film was commissioned by Fox Family for the network's "31 Nights of Halloween" program block, and was directed by Patrick Read Johnson.

Based upon a concept by R. L. Stine, the film's screenplay was written by Johnson and John Lau. Stine then wrote a full novelization of the film as a tie-in.

== Release ==
The film was broadcast on Fox Family on October 21, 2001.

== Reception ==
Derrick Carter from For the Love of Celluloid gave the film a C+ and wrote: "[When Good Ghouls Go Bad] is a decent Halloween flick that will entertain children and offer them a little more risky material that's usually associated with R.L. Stine's tales. It won't annoy adults either, even if some scenes are stupid to say the least. It's far better than recent offerings (Vampire Dog, anyone?), but not as good as something like The Haunting Hour: Don't Think About It (which is also geared at a little older age group). If you're looking for a decent family flick to watch at home and want to see Christopher Lloyd as a charismatic zombie, Good Ghouls should satisfy on both accounts." Richard Scheib from Moria.co gave it two and a half stars, stating: "The majority of children's made-for-television genre movies are completely forgettable – the Disney Channel churns them out by the barrow load. When Good Ghouls Go Bad, which was made for the Fox Network, is surprisingly decent. There are some very nice pieces of writing – like one speech that goes on about considering the beauty of death and cellular disintegration. Or a line like ‘If you don’t survive being scared as a kid, you're not going to survive being scared as an adult,' where you can almost detect R.L. Stine's authorship as an instant response geared to deal with questions about the justification for scaring children."

When Good Ghouls Go Bad won on Australian Guild of Screen Composers award for Best Music for a Mini-Series or Telemovie. The film also was nominated for one DVD Exclusive Award in the category of "Best Actor" (for Lloyd).

== See also ==
- List of films set around Halloween
