= The Boys in the Island =

- Directed by: Geoff Bennett
- Written by: Christopher Koch; Tony Morphett
- Based on: novel by Christopher Koch
- Produced by: Jane Scott
- Starring: Yves Stening
- Production company: Great Scott Pictures
- Release date: 1989
- Running time: 107 minutes
- Country: Australia
- Language: English

Boys in the Island is a 1989 Australian film based on the 1958 novel by Chris Koch.

== Plot ==
In the 1950s teenage Frank dreams of leaving Tasmania for Melbourne.

== Production ==
At one stage Gillian Armstrong had wanted to film the book and approached Koch to make it, but she then elected to make Mrs Soffel instead. Koch decided to make the film himself, and, bitten by his experiences on The Year of Living Dangerously, he decided to keep as much control as he could. He wrote a script with friend Tony Morphett and attached director Carl Schultz. Funds were raised through Antony I. Ginnane and his company, International Film Management Limited. They eventually pulled out but the investors elected to keep going. However, by then Schultz was tied up with post production on The Seventh Sign; four weeks before pre production Geoff Bennett stepped in instead.
