= Bree Timmins =

- Neighbours character
- Portrayed by: Sianoa Smit-McPhee
- Duration: 2005–2007
- First appearance: 4 April 2005
- Last appearance: 13 July 2007
- Introduced by: Ric Pellizzeri
In-universe information
- Occupation: Student at Erinsborough High; Writer
- Father: Greg Baxter
- Mother: Brenda Baxter
- Adoptive father: Kim Timmins
- Adoptive mother: Janelle Timmins
- Brothers: Dwayne Timmins; Brandon Timmins; Dylan Timmins; Scott Timmins
- Sisters: Janae Timmins; Anne Baxter
- Grandmothers: Loris Timmins
- Nieces: Kerry Mangel

Bree Timmins is a fictional character from the Australian soap opera Neighbours, played by Sianoa Smit-McPhee. She made her first screen appearance during the episode broadcast on 4 April 2005. The character was written out in 2006 and she made her final appearance on 13 July 2007.

== Casting ==
Smit-McPhee joined Neighbours in the role of Bree Timmins in early 2005 when she was thirteen years old.

In December 2006 it was announced that the Neighbours producers had decided to write out the characters of Bree and her on-screen mother, Janelle (Nell Feeney). They took the decision not to renew the contracts of Smit-McPhee and Feeney, following the departures of Ben Nicholas (Stingray Timmins) and Damien Bodie (Dylan Timmins). Co-star Ian Smith (Harold Bishop) called the decision a "huge mistake". Bree and Janelle made their final appearances in July 2007. Smit-McPhee later said she left Neighbours "because of the contract and stuff" and that she made the decision with her father. She added, "I didn't want to stay (on Neighbours) any longer and if I'd stayed there more than that I would be known as just Bree and I wanted to do something different."

== Characterisation ==
The character's profile from Network Ten describes Bree as being totally different from her siblings as they are not related biologically. They call her an "introverted and studious girl" and the problem solver of the Timmins family. She "clearly possessed an overactive imagination fueled by years of reading trashy novels and her bizarre flights of fantasy made her a bit of an outsider." Penny Debelle of The Advertiser gave a similar assessment of the character, calling her a "chubby bookworm", who was "a bit of an outsider" and often seen reading fantasy novels. In her early years, Bree was shy, but when she discovers she is not biologically related to the Timmins, she craves a new identity as a "disaffected and disillusioned young adolescent teenager" and transforms into a goth. The Age described the character of Bree as "troubled" and "sullen." They said her major development was "morphing into an 'emo' while grieving for her brother." Of her character, Smit-McPhee said "Bree started off as a geek but a brainy one. When her brother died she didn't really find who she was. I think all teenagers go through that, to find themselves and want to be Paris (Hilton) for a day." Smit-McPhee told Debelle that she was the one who suggested Bree become a Goth, explaining "Really. I was like, 'She's kind of plain, can she go Goth now?' And, I like Paris Hilton. Can she turn into Paris Hilton for a second? It was totally fun going Goth. I got to wear these capes that were different to regular Bree, bookworm Bree. That wasn't me at all."

== Storylines ==
Bree wins a national spelling bee in 2005 and is the winner of an A$15,000 cash prize. She offers the money to her mother, Janelle (Nell Feeney) because the family was in debt at the time, but Janelle decides that the family should all get jobs and that Bree is entitled to the money she had won. Bree rewrites most of Janelle's first novel The Bogan's Tipped Hair and this is disclosed by Janelle in a (fictional) episode of Rove Live, a real television talk show aired on Network Ten, the same network that Neighbours is aired on.

In 2006, it is discovered during a science project that she is not the biological daughter of Janelle and Kim Timmins (Brett Swain), who she believed were her birth parents. The midwife who took care of Bree at the hospital reveals that Bree was switched at birth accidentally because she didn't write out the ID tags. Bree begins searching for her biological family but hides this from her non-biological family due to her worries about what they might feel. Janelle is supportive when she finds out about the search. Bree's search ends abruptly when she receives a letter from her biological parents telling her to stop searching for them, stating that they do not want to know her. Bree believes that since she does not know her birth parents, she has no real identity. Consequentially, she tries out a range of new looks, including Paris Hilton and Gothic looks. Her on-off boyfriend, Zeke Kinski (Matthew Werkmeister), tries to keep up with her new looks to impress her.

Bree makes friends with her biggest book fan, Anne Baxter (Tessa James), who is blind. Anne is revealed to be the biological daughter of Janelle and Kim, though she tries to hide it from her and the rest of the Timmins family. Still searching for a non-Timmins identity, Bree considers changing her name by deed poll, but after finding out that she isn't old enough to legally do so, she instructs her friend Rachel (Caitlin Stasey) to tell people to call her Trinity Black. After the death of her brother Stingray (Ben Nicholas), Bree stops her "gothic" theme.

Bree's non-biological grandmother, Loris Timmins (Kate Fitzpatrick) later reveals to Harold Bishop (Ian Smith) that she swapped Bree with Anne when they were babies because she felt Janelle would be an unfit mother. Feeling guilt over her action, she states that she wants to make things right, and then left Erinsborough, with Bree still unaware that Loris is the cause of the mix-up.

Anne returns in July 2007, and while Bree is pleased to see her, she is soon faced with her biological father (Anne's adoptive father) Greg (Christopher Connolly), who arrives in Erinsborough looking for Anne. When Greg finally accepts that Bree is his daughter, they came up with the plan for the Timmins to move to Cairns, so that the Baxters and Timminses can get to know each other. Dwayne, Brandon and Dylan Timmins all live up north, so they would also be closer to them. The family has a farewell party in the street, where Steiger shocks Janelle by turning it into their wedding. Allan, Janelle, Anne and Bree then fly off to Cairns in a helicopter, leaving the waving neighbours behind.

== Reception ==
For her portrayal of Bree, Smit-McPhee was nominated for Best Young Actor at the 2006 Inside Soap Awards. Larissa Dubecki from The Age praised Bree for redeeming the Timmins family. Dubecki wrote, "played with all the knowing insouciance a 13-year-old can muster by Sianoa Smit-McPhee. Bree is positively sage-like amid the daily hysteria of her mob." She compared Bree to Darlene from Roseanne and added that "her raised-eyebrow archness pleases."

During Bree's parentage storyline, a reporter for the Daily Record commented "Poor Bree. She's never exactly fitted in with the rest of her family. For a start, she's highly intelligent and the sensitive type – two things that the rest of the Timmins clan are rarely accused of being." They observed that Bree had "shown her devious side a few times", suggesting that she might be a Timmins after all.

Katie Baillie, writing for Metro included Bree on a list of the "worst Neighbours characters" ever. She justified Bree's inclusion because "she walked around with a face like a smacked bum, for no good reason." Baillie also disliked Bree's goth phase and said that renaming herself as Trinity Black was "WTF? annoying".
