= Joseph Clements (actor) =

Australian actor

Joseph Clements is an Australian actor who has appeared on film, television, and theatre. He played Senior Sergeant Allan Steiger in the television soap opera Neighbours (2004–07), Simmo in the sitcom Newlyweds (1993–94), and Mike Kankel in the television film When Good Ghouls Go Bad (2001). He is also credited as Joe Clements.

== Career ==
Clements graduated from the National Institute of Dramatic Art in 1987. The following year, he was cast as Louis in the film The Boys in the Island, which was never released. Clements had a main role as Simmo on Newlyweds during its run from 1993 to 1994, and was featured on Home and Away (1989), Rafferty's Rules (1990), Water Rats (1996), and Blue Heelers (2001) in guest roles. He portrayed Allan Steiger in a recurring role on Neighbours from 2004 to 2007.

Clements starred in the 2001 television movie When Good Ghouls Go Bad along with Back to the Future star Christopher Lloyd. He had minor roles in the films Yolngu Boy (2001) and Knowing (2009).

=== Other work ===
Clements performs as Ned Kelly in a live performance of the outlaw's life story at the Old Melbourne Gaol on a regular basis.

Clements played an extra in Channel Seven's Thank God You're Here season finale. He has also appeared in Transport Accident Commission advertisements playing the role of a police Senior Sergeant warning people against the dangers of poor road use.

Clements sang in a rock band, The Joes.

== Filmography ==
Year	Title	Role	Notes
1988	A Country Practice	Policeman	1 episode
1989	Home and Away	Brad Mordue	2 episodes
1990	The Boys in the Island	Louis	TV Movie (unreleased)
1990	Rafferty's Rules	Phil Carver	1 episode
1993–1994	Newlyweds	Simmo	Main role
1994	Law of the Land	Billy Webber	1 episode
1996	Water Rats	Grieves	1 episode
1999	Dead End	Elevator Police Officer	
2001	Yolngu Boy	Policeman at Wharf	Credited as Joe Clements
2001	Ponderosa	Iron Hands Malloy	1 episode
2001	When Good Ghouls Go Bad	Mike Kankel	TV Movie; Credited as Joe Clements
2001	Blue Heelers	Gary Gillard	1 episode Credited as Joe Clements
2002	MDA	Eric Donoheugh	1 episode
2003	The Wannabes	Phillip Drayton	Credited as Joe Clements
2005	The Secret Life of Us	Lawyer	1 episode
2004–2007	Neighbours	Allan Steiger	Recurring role Credited as Joe Clements
2009	Knowing	FBI Agent	
2009	The Jesus Spoon	The Shopkeeper	Short film Credited as Joe Clements
2010	City Homicide	Randall Finister	1 episode
2015	Death or Liberty	Cuffay's Judge	Documentary; Credited as Joe Clements
2016	The Kettering Incident	Brendan Trengrove	4 episodes
