= Nell Feeney =

Australian actress (born 1964)

- Born: 29 July 1966 (age 60)
- Education: WAAPA (1988–1990) AFTRS (2010)
- Occupations: Actress, writer
- Years active: 1988–present
- Known for: Neighbours as Janelle Timmins

Nell Feeney (born 29 July 1966) is an Australian actress who played Janelle Timmins on the Australian soap opera Neighbours.

== Early life and education ==
In 1988, Feeney started studying acting at Western Australian Academy of Performing Arts (WAAPA), graduating in 1990. In 2010, she studied a Graduate Certificate in Screenwriting & Directing at Australian Film, Television and Radio School (AFTRS).

== Career ==
Feeney appeared on Neighbours from November 2004 to July 2007, returning briefly in 2015. She had also appeared in the soap the previous year as Joanne Blair. Her contract with Neighbours expired during the course of 2007, and she left the show along with Sianoa Smit-McPhee, who played her on-screen daughter Bree Timmins.

Feeney appeared in the movie Mallboy, alongside her Neighbours on-screen husband Brett Swain.

She has appeared in many other Australian television shows, including City Homicide, Rush, Blue Heelers, Dirt Game, Stingers, and Winners & Losers.

== Personal life ==
Feeney met fellow Neighbours cast member Shane Connor, when he made a guest appearance in TV series Phoenix, on which Feeney was starring. They were married in 1994 and Feeney gave birth to twins Thomas and Grace in 1995. Feeney and Connor were divorced in 1997.

== Filmography ==
=== Film ===
Year	Title	Role	Notes
1993	Clowning Around 2	Lilly	TV movie
1994	The Feds: Obsession	Rose Dell'oro	TV movie
1995	The Feds: Deception	Rose Dell'oro	TV movie
1995	The Feds: Abduction	Rose Dell'oro	TV movie
1995	The Feds: Terror	Rose Dell'oro	TV movie
1996	The Feds: Deadfall	Rose Dell'oro	TV movie
2000	Mallboy	Jenny	Short film
2000	Wee Jimmy	Jean	Short film
	Desire	The woman	Short film
2003	Three Weeks in Koh Samui	Mum (Gena)	Short film
2007	Tasmanian Devil: The Fast and Furious Life of Errol Flynn	Additional voices	TV movie
2010	Ours		Short film
2023	Foe	Tailing Waitress	Feature film

=== Television ===
Year	Title	Role	Notes
1991	Home and Away	Sandra	1 episode
1991	A Country Practice	Roxanne Hartley	Season 11, 2 episodes
1992	Phoenix	Megan Edwards	Season 1, 11 episodes
1995	Fire	Phoebe	Season 1, episode 11: "Glory Days"
1995	Snowy River: The Mcgregor Saga	Elsie Morgan	Season 3, 2 episodes
1998	State Coroner	Sally Allbright	Season 2, episode 4: "The Gift of Life"
2001	The Secret Life of Us	Marriage Counsellor	Season 1, episode 6: "Expect the Unexpected"
1998–01	Blue Heelers	Fran Bennett / Sonia Weller / Sandra Stevens	Seasons 5–8, 3 episodes
2001	Halifax f.p.	Maureen O'Connor	Season 6, episode 2: "Playing God"
2002	Stingers	Vicki Quinlan	Season 5, episode 17: "Mind Games"
2002	MDA	Elise Fenton	Season 1, episode 10: "Quid Pro Quo"
2008	Rush	Denise	Season 1, episode 12
2009	Dirt Game	Laurie	Miniseries, 2 episodes
2010	City Homicide	Kitty Bancroft	Season 4, episode 6: "Last Seen"
2011–14	Winners & Losers	Carolyn Gilbert	Seasons 1–4, 20 episodes
2003–15	Neighbours	Janelle Timmins	88 episodes
2015	The Doctor Blake Mysteries	Pamela Gilchrist	Season 3, episode 5: "A Night to Remember"
2015	Miss Fisher's Murder Mysteries	Hilda Cobb	Season 3, episode 6: "Death at the Grand"
2018	Superwog	Concierge	Season 1, episode 6: "Power Trip"
2020	The Gloaming	Shelly Hopkins	Miniseries, 6 episodes
2021	Ms Fisher's Modern Murder Mysteries	Oona O'Doherty	Season 2, episode 8: "New Year's Evil"

== Stage ==
Year	Title	Role	Notes
1991	The Egg and Spoon Man		Carlton Courthouse, Melbourne with La Mama
1992	In Angel Gear		Universal Theatre, Melbourne with Mystic Productions
1992; 1998	D.A.R.K. The Adventures of Diane Arbus		Kaff Theatre, Perth, Universal Theatre, Melbourne with Moondog Theatre Company
1993	M. Butterfly	Renee / Woman at Party / Girl in magazine	Playhouse, Melbourne, Canberra Theatre, Seymour Centre, Sydney with MTC
1997	Macbeth		Victorian regional tour with MTC
2003	God's Last Acre	Kerry Phillips	Malthouse Theatre, Melbourne with Playbox Theatre Company
2011	The Sum of Us	Joyce	HIT Productions
2012	Happy Ending	Louise	Southbank Theatre with MTC
2017	Credentials	Rosy	La Mama Courthouse, Melbourne
2013	When Dad Married Fury	Sue	HIT Productions
