= List of Neighbours characters introduced in 1991 =

Neighbours is an Australian television soap opera that was first broadcast on 18 March 1985. The following is a list of characters that first appeared in the serial in 1991, by order of first appearance. The 7th season of Neighbours began airing on 21 January 1991. All characters were introduced by executive producer Don Battye. Michael Daniels was introduced in June. Rachel Blakely and Genevieve Lemon made their debuts in August as Gaby Willis and Brenda Riley respectively. Andrew Williams joined the cast as Brenda's nephew, Guy Carpenter in September, as did Simone Robertson as Phoebe Bright. Faye Hudson played by Lorraine Bayly, and the year's first baby Andrew Robinson, son of established characters Paul and Christina Robinson, were introduced in November.

== Michael Daniels ==
Michael Daniels
- Neighbours character
- Portrayed by: Brian Blain
- First appearance: 12 June 1991
- Last appearance: 11 September 1991
- Introduced by: Don Battye
In-universe information
- Wife: Louise Daniels (until 1991); Helen Daniels (1991; annulled)
- First cousins: Bill Daniels
- Other relatives: Paul Robinson; Lucy Robinson

Michael Daniels, played by Brian Blain, made his first appearance on 12 June 1991. The character was introduced as a cousin of Helen Daniels' (Anne Haddy) late husband, Bill. He also became a love interest for Helen, something that Haddy was delighted with. She thought it was "about time" that her character was happy, adding "There's a need for love at all ages." In her book The Neighbours Programme Guide, Josephine Monroe said Michael "seemed to be perfect – charming, sensitive and funny". Helen and Michael eventually marry in an Edwardian-style ceremony. The scenes were filmed at a church in the Dandenong Ranges. It marked the fourth time Blain had played a groom in a screen wedding. While reviewing the wedding episode, Peter Holmes of The Sydney Morning Herald took a dislike to Michael, commenting "You'll excuse the indulgence, but I reckon the bloke's a bit of a cad." Holmes noted there were some instances which raised suspicion about Michael's intentions and thought the marriage was headed for "certain disaster." Monroe wrote that the character had "a heartbreaking secret – he was already married."

Michael meets Helen Daniels (Haddy) while she is waiting for an X-ray at the hospital following a fall. As they talk, they realise they share the same surname and are related – Michael's cousin Bill was Helen's late husband. They enjoy each other's company and begin dating. Michael plans to propose to Helen while they are at The Waterhole with an engagement ring in a champagne glass. However, when Michael returns from the toilet, he finds the glass gone and he panics. Michael recovers the ring and proposes to Helen, who accepts. Jim Robinson (Alan Dale) insists on paying for the wedding, but Michael will not hear of it. Jim also makes some suggestions, but Michael and Helen tell him they only want a small gathering with family and friends, who live locally. Ahead of the wedding, Michael confides in Jim that he is getting cold feet. Jim urges Michael to think carefully before calling the wedding off. Michael relents and Jim keeps quiet about his doubts. The day of the wedding arrives and Michael arranges for the guests to arrive in vintage cars at the church. The ceremony goes off without a hitch and Helen and Michael are married. At the reception, the bride and groom figures fall off the cake and Melanie Pearson (Lucinda Cowden) sees this as bad omen. When Jim takes a call from Michael's cousin, Alf, he learns that Michael is married. Jim goes to Perth to talk with Michael's friend Charles Milner (Peter Drake) about Louise Daniels (Maggie Payne), whom Michael said was his sister. When Jim presses for information about Michael and Louise being divorced, Charles is silent and Jim realises Michael is a bigamist. When Michael and Helen return from their honeymoon, Jim urges Michael to tell Helen the truth and he reluctantly does. Helen asks Michael to leave. A few days later, Michael offers to take Helen to meet Louise, which she agrees to. They visit Louise at a care home and Michael explains Louise has progressive dementia, brought on by schizophrenia and her condition has been deteriorating for a number of years. Helen is sympathetic, but cannot condone his actions which have hurt her and she refuses to continue being with him. Several months later, Michael sends Helen a letter informing her that Louise has died. He asks Helen to marry him again and move to England, but she declines.

== Gaby Willis ==
Gaby Willis, played by Rachel Blakely, made her first appearance on 12 August 1991. Blakely was invited to audition for the role by a Neighbours casting director, who spotted her picture on the cover of a magazine. The character was introduced alongside her brother Brad Willis, played by Scott Michaelson. Gaby was initially said to be studying at a business school in Japan. She later becomes a boutique owner. Josephine Monroe, author of Neighbours: The First 10 Years thought that Gaby's "cascading dark hair" and model looks meant there was never a shortage of men after her. An Inside Soap writer stated Gaby and Glen Donnelly (Richard Huggett) had Ramsay Street's biggest on-off romance since Scott (Jason Donovan) and Charlene (Kylie Minogue). Gaby later gives birth to a son Zac (Jay Callahan). Blakely reprised her role for the show's 20th anniversary episode in July 2005.

== Brenda Riley ==
Brenda Riley
- Neighbours character
- Portrayed by: Genevieve Lemon
- Duration: 1991–1992
- First appearance: 21 August 1991
- Last appearance: 4 March 1992
- Introduced by: Don Battye
In-universe information
- Occupation: Coffee Shop manager
- Father: Arthur Carpenter
- Brothers: Lou Carpenter
- Husband: Roy Riley (backstory)
- Nephews: Guy Carpenter

Brenda Riley, played by Genevieve Lemon, made her first appearance on 21 August 1991. The character was introduced amid a large revamp of the show, which had seen a decline in ratings and several characters written out. Brenda's arrival preceded that of her nephew Guy Carpenter (Andrew Williams), who was introduced shortly after. Brenda becomes the "new face behind the counter" when she takes over the Coffee Shop, as Harold Bishop (Ian Smith) and Madge Bishop (Anne Charleston) leave for an extended holiday. In February 1992, David Brown of TV Week reported that after only six months in the role, Lemon would be "moving out of Ramsay Street" to begin filming a part in The Piano. Vanessa Keys of The Daily Telegraph described Brenda as "a hard-bitten woman". A writer for BBC Online said Brenda's most notable moment was "Putting Pam in a frenzy"

Brenda is the younger sister of Lou Carpenter (Tom Oliver). When Lou tells her his former partner Madge Bishop (Charleston) and her husband Harold Bishop (Smith) are leasing the Coffee Shop while they tour Australia, Brenda heads to Erinsborough and secures an interview. Madge and Brenda get along well, but Harold finds her coarse jokes off-putting. Madge convinces him Brenda is the best person for the job and they also rent out Number 24 Ramsay Street to her. Madge is sure she recognises Brenda from somewhere and she admits she is Lou's sister, which upsets Harold, who previously competed with Lou for Madge's affections. Harold is keen to terminate the agreement, but softens when Brenda is able to get him a $5000 discount on a campervan for the Bishops' trip and agrees to let her stay.

When Brenda looks after Harold's grandchildren Toby (Ben Guerens) and Sky Mangel (Miranda Fryer), Toby lies and tells her that he is allowed to stay up later than normal on weekends, much to Madge's ire. However, when the children are tired out the next day, Brenda explains that she wanted to them teach them a lesson that getting their own way is not always a good thing. Madge apologises to Brenda before she and Harold leave on their trip. Brenda's nephew Guy Carpenter (Williams) arrives looking for a place to stay and the neighbours are surprised when they see Brenda moving Guy's belongings in, and they think she is dating a younger man. Brenda then explains that Guy is Lou's son and did not want Harold knowing in case he became upset again. When Harold disappears after being swept off of a rock and is presumed dead, Madge goes to visit her family to get over the loss and Brenda takes over the Coffee shop indefinitely. She immediately becomes a popular fixture. However, her gossiping gets her in trouble when she unwittingly tells Felicity Brent (Rona McLeod) about Dorothy Burke's (Maggie Dence) marital problems, which Felicity uses in the local elections to discredit Dorothy, leaving her furious when she loses her seat and a feud develops.

Brenda reciprocates when Doug Willis (Terence Donovan), a married man known for flirting, catches her eye. Brenda becomes convinced he is attracted to her and that his marriage to Pam Willis (Sue Jones) is failing. Brenda and Doug begin spending together and she tries to seduce him after learning her former husband, Roy (Neil Melville), is remarrying. Brenda becomes emotional and asks Doug to stay with her that night but the plan backfires when Doug sends over Pam to talk to her. Things come to a head when Brenda kisses Doug which is witnessed by his daughter, Gaby Willis (Rachel Blakely). Pam confronts Doug and he is forced to tell Brenda that the flirting was a bit of fun. Brenda is humiliated and avoids her neighbours until Pam tells her that she has nothing against her and explains about Doug's behaviour.

When Brenda discovers Guy is taking steroids to help him in the upcoming Cross-Country race, she tries to make him see sense, but Guy refuses to listen, so Brenda threatens to take steroids herself as long as Guy continues to do so. Guy, fearful, relents and quits taking them. Brenda's problems worsen when it seems that her homemade tuna quiche is the cause of Josh Anderson's (Jeremy Angerson) sickness and she tries to recover any previously sold quiches. Brenda panics when she sees a motionless Bouncer on the floor, but he is only playing dead. Brenda is relieved to find that the quiche is not the cause of Josh's sickness but a virus going around.

Brenda and Dorothy's feud is reignited, after Dorothy tells her off for employing Toby for after school shifts. Brenda schemes by placing a personal advert in the paper's lonely hearts column under Dorothy's name. However, the plan is undone when Lucy Robinson (Melissa Bell) tells Dorothy, who then arranges for a colleague to pose as a suitor. Brenda and Dorothy later become friends after they win a radio quiz. Doug tries to set Brenda up with his workmate Nev Cusack (Jim Ewing) at a dinner party, but he is more interested in Doug's sister Faye Hudson (Lorraine Bayly). Roy arrives much to Brenda's surprise and wants to get back with her after splitting with his wife, Simone (Clarissa House), and plans to set up business in Malaysia and wants Brenda to come with him. Simone encourages Brenda to take a second chance with Roy. Feeling uncertain, Brenda tells Roy to go on without her. After a boring date with Adrian Pitt (Andrew Larkins), Brenda realises Roy is her one true love and leaves Erinsborough.

== Guy Carpenter ==
Guy Carpenter, played by Andrew Williams, made his first appearance on 10 September 1991. Williams joined the cast of Neighbours as Guy after failing to secure a record contract. He almost rejected the role and explained, "I was still in music mode and I thought Kylie, Jason, Craig... not me, no way". A few months after joining the serial, Williams decided to leave. On 28 November 2014, it was announced that Williams had reprised his role as Guy for Neighbours 30th anniversary in March 2015. A writer from the BBC said that Guy's most memorable moment was dating three women at the same time. Lisa Anthony from BIG! branded Guy a "heart throb". Alex Cramb from Inside Soap called the character "Neighbours nice guy". TV Week's Elisabeth di Giovanni observed that Guy was a smooth-talker and "a charming rogue".

== Phoebe Bright ==
Phoebe Bright, played by Simone Robertson, made her first appearance on 23 September 1991. Robertson was desperate to secure the role of Phoebe when she learned of the casting. She knew that the character was going to be a "bit freaky" and decided play herself up to the persona. She attended the audition wearing thick glasses and her hair in pigtails. Two days later Robertson was informed that she had won the part. In August 1993, columnists from Shout and Inside Soap reported that both Robertson and her co-star Lochie Daddo were leaving their roles. A writer for the BBC described Phoebe's most notable moment as "Being held hostage at number 30 by Bob Landers."

== Andrew Robinson ==
Andrew Robinson, played by Shannon Holmes, made his first appearance on 13 November 1991. Andrew was born to Paul Robinson (Stefan Dennis) and Christina Alessi (Gayle Blakeney). He departed with his parents in 1992. A writer for BBC Online commented that Andrew was "a delightful little baby" who had endured an unsettled beginning to life. In December 2009, the character was reintroduced to the show after a seventeen-year absence. Actor Jordan Smith was cast in the role. Andrew returns to Erinsborough to reconnect with his father. His backstory was changed to accommodate Smith's Scottish accent. Originally Andrew and Christina moved from Brazil back to Australia, but this was amended to include an intervening stay in Scotland. Smith described his character as "very calculating" and "extremely selfish". He added, "There are definitely characteristics of his father."

== Faye Hudson ==
Faye Hudson
- Neighbours character
- Portrayed by: Lorraine Bayly
- Duration: 1991–1992
- First appearance: 28 November 1991
- Last appearance: 14 May 1992
- Introduced by: Don Battye
In-universe information
- Occupation: Housewife
- Family: Willis
- Father: Bert Willis
- Brothers: Doug Willis
- Husband: Kevin Hudson (backstory)
- Sons: Cameron Hudson
- Nephews: Adam Willis; Brad Willis
- Nieces: Gaby Willis; Cody Willis
- Other relatives: Zac Willis

Faye Hudson, played by Lorraine Bayly, made her first appearance on 28 November 1991. Faye is introduced as Doug Willis's (Terence Donovan) sister. Producer Don Battye thought the addition of Bayly "strengthened the cast". He said that she enjoyed the role because Faye is "such great fun" and very different from the characters she had played in The Sullivans and Carson's Law. He also said that Faye is "always putting her foot in her mouth" and that during the new year, "she's going to be like a dripping tap – everyone in Ramsay Street will want to turn her off." A writer for TV Week reported that producers were so confident about Bayle's character, they re-signed her to return after a prior commitment to appear in a play in May/June 1992.

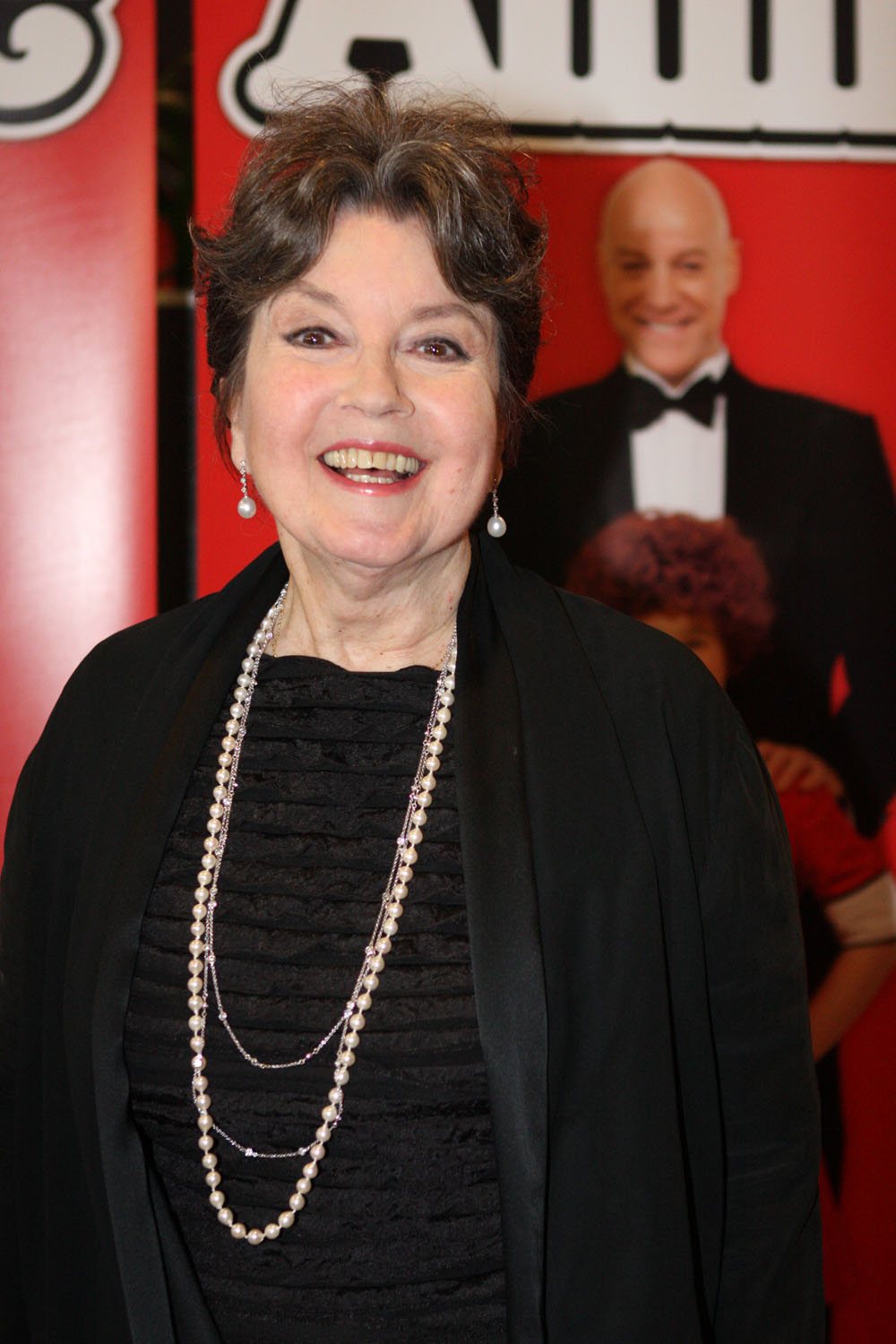
Lorraine Bayly played Faye until May 1992.

Bayly finished her filming commitments with the show on 3 April 1992 amid a "cast shake-up", which saw four cast members leave and three arrive, including Benjamin Grant Mitchell as Faye's son Cameron Hudson. Bayly quit Neighbours to begin rehearsing for a stage show. She made her last appearance in May, but Battye expected her to return later in the year. Bayly was also keen to return, saying "If Faye can help the show, I'd like to come back."

Tim Davey, the television critic for the Bristol Evening Post was not a fan of Faye's attempts to date Jim Robinson (Alan Dale). He called Faye "the man-eating next door Neighbour" and thought that Jim passing up "a naughty night with Faye" by throwing himself at Dorothy Burke (Maggie Dence) was not very believable. Author Josephine Monroe called the character "outrageous", while Shelley Dempsey of The Sun-Herald branded Faye a "busybody". The BBC said Faye's most notable moment was "Being jilted at the altar by Nev Cusack." The character was nominated for Soap's Biggest Bitch at the 1993 Inside Soap TV Awards.

Faye stays at Number 28 much to the consternation of her brother, Doug Willis, and his family. During the first day of her arrival, she scolds Toby Mangel (Ben Guerens) for playing with snails, which Doug has asked him to collect and criticises Pam Willis's (Sue Jones) cooking. Faye's presence serves to irritate the family when she meddles in their affairs and generally takes over the house. The family try various schemes to get rid of her but they backfire. Faye leaves for a short holiday with Nev Cusack (Jim Ewing), a friend of Doug's and when she returns Faye reveals that she and Nev are engaged. On the day of the wedding, Doug is forced to break the news that Nev has jilted her. After her initial unhappiness, Faye pursues Jim Robinson (Dale) much to his displeasure. Jim enlists Dorothy Burke's (Dence) help to stage a cover that they are a couple to ward off Faye's attention.

Faye's stay with the Willises comes to an end when she oversteps the mark by inviting Doug's childhood sweetheart, Alexandra Lomax (Chantal Contouri) to dinner and telling Pam that Doug only married her on the rebound. Doug tells her to leave and she does, only to move two doors down to Number 32 which she rents from Helen Daniels (Anne Haddy). Cameron Hudson (Mitchell), Faye's estranged son arrives to defend Pam on a murder charge and later moves in with her after they repair their relationship. Gaby Willis (Rachel Blakely), Faye's niece opens her own fashion boutique Gabrielle's at the Lassiter's complex and Faye cannot help but interfere. One night, Faye fails to turn off a heater, which results in the shop burning down. For a while she remains silent but confesses to a furious Gaby. The insurance company sues Faye and she flees Erinsborough at night. Faye later communicates with the family via postcards and is last known to be living in Paris.

== Others ==
Date(s)	Character	Actor	Circumstances
28 January	Sam	Trent Mooney	Sam picks up Todd Landers while he is hitchhiking. Todd and Sam stop for lunch then continue on their journey until Sam spots the Police following them and panics as the car he is driving is stolen. As the police close in, Sam stops the car and flees leaving Todd behind to be caught by the police.
29 January	Lara Benjamin	Samantha Bews	A girl on the same ward at as Gemma Ramsay at Erinsborough Hospital. She bores and depresses Gemma with her negativity and tells Gemma a girl in the next ward is about to have her leg amputated, which does not help the mood of Gemma, who may lose her own leg. When Lara falls asleep, Gemma's father Tom and boyfriend Matt Robinson wheel her bed out of Gemma's Room.
29 January–4 July	Frank Alessi	Robert Ruggierro	Christina and Caroline Alessi's parents. They visit the twins ahead of Christina's wedding to Paul Robinson. Frank gives Christina away at the wedding. Several months later, Frank reappears when Margaret leaves him, which he does not realise as he thinks she has gone to stay with Paul and the twins. Frank agrees to promote an employee of his, in order for him to spend more time with Margaret and they reconcile. Two years later, Margaret returns to look after her teenage nephew Rick, while his parents Benito and Cathy are away visiting their elder son, Marco in Italy. Rick, tired of Margaret's fussing then schemes to get rid of Margaret which fails at first but ultimately succeeds.
29 January–4 July 1991, 3–5 March 1993	Margaret Alessi	Bev Gardiner	
5–8 February	Katherine Simpson	Patricia Anthony	A former nurse who served in the Vietnam war along with Maureen Donnelly. Jim Robinson tracks her down in order to confirm he is Glen Donnelly's father. Katherine tells Jim that she and Maureen had swapped name tags and Maureen never told Jim the truth during their affair. Katherine admits that she kept in touch with Maureen after the war but eventually lost touch and never knew that Maureen had died.
22 February–6 June	Donald Henson	John Simpson	A hotelier who arrives from Chicago to meet Paul Robinson to discuss a business deal but Paul is away on his honeymoon with his wife Christina. Caroline Alessi, Christina's sister, tries to deal with Henson but he is very rude to her and is only prepared to talk to Paul. Caroline tries to get Paul's father, Jim to talk to Henson but he is adamant he will only talk to Paul. By the time Paul returns, Henson has left. Paul then flies to Chicago to sort things out. Several months later, Henson sends Paul's aunt, Rosemary Daniels to spy on Lassiter's. Henson returns to Erinsborough several months later to finalize a merger with Lassiter's and gives Paul an ultimatum; sign the contract or become the competition, which he grudgingly does. Staff morale drops when the existing Lassiter's employees learn that they will be replaced by Henson's own people. Caroline, after interviewing with a job with Parkside Pacific, learns Henson is part of a plot to put Lassiter's out of business by making changes and tells Paul. Henson tells Paul he could have him thrown out of Lassiter's, but Paul reminds him he has a business relationship with Mr. Udagawa and has been buying shares in Henson's company. Henson agrees to tear up the agreement as long as Paul pulls out of the takeover. and he agrees.
22–25 February	Mr Gibbs	Simon Woodward	A science teacher at Erinsborough High. Rumours of him molesting girls at his previous school become common knowledge and Melissa Jarrett begins a crusade against him, despite learning that Gibbs was proven innocent. Things are not helped when Gibbs walks into the girls' changing rooms by accident as the result of a prank. When Melissa starts a petition to get Gibbs removed, he chases after her and confronts her. When she refuses to listen, Gibbs grabs her, which principal Dorothy Burke witnesses. While Dorothy is supportive of Gibbs, Melissa is unrepentant. It later emerges that at Melissa's previous school, a teacher who looked like Mr Gibbs molested her and she remained quiet about it. Melissa then drops her complaint.
28 February	Virginia Wenham	Kristie Grant	Virginia meets Ryan McLachlan when he begins working as a postman. She begins flirting with him and invites him back to her place. Ryan tries to fix her tap but ends up soaking his clothes and is forced to borrow Virginia's dressing gown. Virginia panics when her husband Bernie, returns and quickly ushers Ryan out of the front door. Bernie narrowly misses Ryan McLachlan fleeing in his wife's dressing gown. Several days later, Bernie arrives at Number 30, where Ryan lives to sell him some Encyclopedias. Ryan realises who he is and tries to get rid of him but Bernie forces his way in and delivers a sales pitch. He mentions that a postman tried to make a move on his wife. Ryan is then strong-armed into buying the encyclopedias and Bernie leaves but threatens Ryan to stay away from Virginia.
28 February–4 March	Bernie Wenham	Robert Morgan	
26 March–16 April	Phil Hoffman	Shane Connor	Phil meets Gemma Ramsay, Christina Robinson and her twin sister Caroline Alessi at the Waterhole. Phil approaches Caroline and mentions he recognises her from the Lassiter's brochure. They have a drink and get along well and agree to meet each other again. Soon after, Detective Alan Stewart warns the twins that Carter, the man threatening them out of testifying of a murder they had witnessed the previous year may have an accomplice. Phil and Caroline grow closer. Phil is then revealed to be behind the threatening phone calls and notes. The twins, still oblivious to Phil, trust him to take Christina to the airport to meet her husband Paul. Paul arrives home but there is no sign of Christina and Phil. Caroline then suggests they call Stewart, but Phil comes in through the back door, threatening to kill Christina unless Paul and Caroline comply with giving a false statements in court in order to acquit Carter. Paul tries to attack Phil with a poker but is warned against it. On the day of the trial, Caroline posing as Christina complies with the plan and Stewart is suspicious. Phil tries to escape but is immediately apprehended. Paul and Caroline then rescue Christina from Phil's basement.
29 March–24 May	Colin Burke	Robert Alexander	Dorothy Burke's estranged husband. Ryan McLachlan, Dorothy's nephew finds a letter written to Dorothy from Colin and finds words cut out of the paper and works out that Colin had been in prison, instead of dead as Dorothy has led people to believe. Dorothy admits that Colin is alive and is serving time for fraud. Dorothy spots Colin in the Waterhole one night but is uncertain whether it is him. When Dorothy visits her Neighbours Madge and Harold Bishop, she is shocked to learn that Colin is their dinner guest. Dorothy is frosty at first but then warms to Colin again and invites him to move in. They become closer and talk of giving their marriage a second chance. When Colin takes a position as the church accountant, Harold suspects him when the money goes missing but He explains that he was able to get a better interest rate at another bank and Reverend Craig Richards vouches for him and Harold apologises. Colin meets Rosemary Daniels at the pub and they have dinner and a few drinks, then begin an affair. Joe Mangel, Dorothy's neighbour spots Colin and Rosemary together at Lassiter's in a hotel room while he is cleaning the Complex windows. Joe tells his housemate Melanie Pearson, who tells Dorothy who is disbelieving at first but when Dorothy arrives at the hotel, she catches Colin and Rosemary together. Both women reject Colin after he tries to explain his actions. Joe and Jim Robinson then escort Colin from Ramsay Street after he tries to apologise to Dorothy who refuses to listen.
10 April–13 August	Wilf Turner	Terry Trimble	A client of Doug Willis. Doug becomes annoyed when Wilf stalls on payment for work Doug did on a house for him, citing shoddy workmanship, refusing to pay until his architect has had a look. Several months later, Doug's daughter, Gaby poses as a lawyer in order to get $12,000 in order to pay her brother Brad's legal fees. Wilf refuses to pay up and is prepared to go to court. When Wilf comes to Number 28, he runs into Gaby again and she and her brother Adam concoct a story that she is Adam's girlfriend and Wilf believes it and eventually pays up.
22 May–29 July	Darren Wood	Troy Beckwith	A Year 11 classmate of Cody Willis and Todd Landers. When Cody and temporarily Todd break up, Cody dates Darren for a while. However, Cody is not as keen on Darren as he is on her and becomes uncomfortable when he makes a move on her. After Darren refuses to take no for an answer, Cody pushes him away causing him to fall and knock himself out. Darren regains consciousness and lies to a friend that he and Cody went further. Cody then takes revenge on Darren by flirting with him and encouraging him to strip. Cody then steals Darren's clothes and bike, leaving him in his underwear. Darren later apologises and Cody forgives him. Several months later, Darren reappears and tries to win Cody one more time but she tells him she will always love Todd.
14 June	Yvonne Beckett	Reylene Pearce	The parents of Tim Beckett, a teenager who has died while on a scout trip. They arrive at Number 24 Ramsay Street to meet Tim's scoutmaster Harold Bishop, who blames himself for Tim's death. Harold's pain is eased when the Becketts tell him that Tim spoke very highly of him and invite him to give a eulogy at Tim's funeral, which he agrees to do.
14 June	Roy Beckett	Peter Farago	The parents of Tim Beckett, a teenager who has died while on a scout trip. They arrive at Number 24 Ramsay Street to meet Tim's scoutmaster Harold Bishop, who blames himself for Tim's death. Harold's pain is eased when the Becketts tell him that Tim spoke very highly of him and invite him to give a eulogy at Tim's funeral, which he agrees to do.
17 June, 13 November	Dr Parsons	John Benton	A gynaecologist, who treats a pregnant Christina Alessi who suffers pain and bleeding. He tells her husband Paul Robinson and her sister Caroline Alessi that it is a threatened miscarriage, but the ultrasound shows the baby is okay at the moment. He advises that Christina should be kept calm and relaxed. The bleeding continues and Dr Parsons tells Paul that Christina is anaemic. He warns Paul and Caroline that the next 24 hours will be crucial, as Christina is still at risk of a miscarriage. The bleeding later stops and the pregnancy continues as normal. Dr Parsons later delivers Christina and Paul's son Andrew.
16–22 July	Sarah Livingston	Andrea McEwan	Sarah meets Toby Mangel when he comes with his father Joe and Glen Donnelly when they do some gardening work at her mother's place. Toby is instantly smitten with Sarah but when he finally works up the nerve to talk to her, he is disappointed when she tells him she likes Glen. Sarah arrives on Ramsay Street to see Glen, who sets her straight about not being in a hurry to grow up and that he is too old for her. Sarah, conceding defeat agrees to go on a date with Toby to the local pizza place, however the date is ruined when Sarah's family turn up.
31 July–28 August	Charles Milner	Peter Drake	An old friend of Michael Daniels, who flies in from Perth to act as best man at Michael's wedding to Helen Daniels. Several weeks later, while Michael and Helen are away on their honeymoon, Jim Robinson, Helen's son-in-law begins to doubt Michael is being truthful with Helen. During a business trip to Perth, Jim pays Charles a visit as his practice and explains that he spoke to a few relatives about a woman named Louise, Michael claimed to be his sister but they told him that Louise was his wife. Charles tries to tell Jim that the people he spoke to were mistaken but Jim presses and Charles tells him that Louise has progressive dementia, no longer recognises Michael and is in a care home. When Jim queries about the divorce, Charles is silent and Jim realises that Michael is a bigamist.
31 July 1991, 17 July 1992	Minister	Barry Friedlander	The Minister who marries Helen Daniels and Michael Daniels. The following year, he conducts the funeral of Todd Landers.
2 August 1991 – 6 February 1992, 9 June 2022	Karen Constantine	Fiona Jarvis; Amanda LaBonte	Glen Donnelly's former partner. She tells him he is the father of her unborn baby and he agrees to marry her. However, on the day of the wedding, Karen jilts Glen and reveals that he is not the father and leaves Erinsborough in shame. Karen reappears several months later with her daughter, Rose, when Glen is in hospital following a fall from the roof of Lassiters Hotel. Glen and Karen then reconcile and move away from Erinsborough without telling anyone their whereabouts. When Glen is reunited with his half-siblings 30 years later, he explains that he and Karen married after they left Erinsborough, but are now separated. The following year, Nicolette Stone visits Karen at her cafe in Mallacoota. When Nicolette mentions that she is concerned about how Glen acts around Kiri Durant, Karen mentions that they were previously friends with a couple whose daughter was named Kiri. They confirm that they are talking about the same person, and Karen notes that Kiri would not remember Glen, as they moved away shortly after she was born.
5 August 1991 – 7 August 1992	Simon Hunter	Fred Whitlock	Simon meets Melanie Pearson at Lassiter's when he attends a hardware convention for his store at the hotel and she is immediately attracted to him. When Melanie invites Simon around to teach him how to type, her housemate Joe Mangel (who unknown to Melanie, has feelings for her) is hostile to Simon. Simon and Melanie get closer much to Joe's chagrin and begin dating. When Simon asks Melanie to move in with him, she tells him things are moving too fast. Undeterred, Simon proposes to Melanie, which she accepts after telling him she will as long as the wedding is delayed. Melanie calls off the engagement when she realises she has feelings for Joe after they are matched up on dating show "Dream Date". Simon is hurt and angry with Joe and asks Melanie if Joe is what Melanie really wants, to which she says yes. Simon is devastated and Melanie hands him back his ring. Several months later, Simon reappears when he asks Doug Willis to do some DIY demonstrations at his store. He takes a liking to Doug's daughter, Gaby and they get on well, however, Gaby discovers Simon has a girlfriend and momentarily gives up on him. When Simon and Zed, who Gaby has briefly been dating, show up at the same time to take Gaby out, She lets both men down gently as not to offend the other. Simon and Gaby then resume their relationship. Gaby agrees to go away for the weekend with Simon to a hotel in the country. During the weekend, they are forced to cater to a difficult guest when the owner of the hotel disappears. Following Paul and Christina Robinson's vow renewal, Simon invites Gaby for dinner at his place. The evening is pleasant enough until Simon attempts to rape Gaby. Doug goes after Simon and punches him threatening him to keep away from Gaby. Simon tries to apologise and Gaby is adamant that she is going to the police. Simon tells Gaby if she presses rape charges on him, he will press assault charges on Doug as his Neighbours witnessed the events. Gaby drops the charges and agrees to settle out of court as long as Simon attends counselling. Simon apologises and offers Gaby money to keep her boutique going but she refuses and tells him to get out of her life, which he does.
12 August–19 September	Alec Brewster	Kirk Alexander	Alec is overheard arguing with his wife, Nancy by Joe Mangel and Todd Landers. When they see Alec burying a refuse sack, Todd becomes convinced he has murdered Nancy. Joe is skeptical but when Todd phones pretending to be from a record store, Alec tells him Nancy will not be coming back and more suspicion arises when Simon Hunter mentions that Alec was in his store buying concrete. At night, Joe and Todd dig up the Brewster garden and find what they think is Nancy's body and but before they can do anything, Alec comes out and threatens to the call the police. Joe quizzes him on the contents of the bag and Alex explains that they are Nancy's personal effects and she has left him and they agree to let the matter drop. However, Todd remains convinced and enlists Lucy Robinson and Josh Anderson to return to the garden with him and resume digging. Alec catches Todd again and is very short with him, professing his innocence. However, Alec is arrested and implicated in Nancy's murder but is released when Todd, Josh and Lucy run into Nancy and convince her to tell the police the truth.
28 August	Bob Cooper	Felice Arena	A guest at Melanie Pearson and Simon Hunter's engagement party, who Brenda Riley flirts with.
11 September	Louise Daniels	Maggie Payne	Michael Daniels' wife. Michael takes Helen Daniels to meet her in the nursing home where she resides. Michael explains to Helen that Louise has progressive dementia and that he could not bring himself to leave her. Several months later, Helen receives a letter from Michael telling her that Louise has died.
20 September	Nancy Brewster	Marilyn Maguire	Alec Brewster's wife. Nancy leaves him after an argument and Todd Landers is convinced that Alec has murdered Nancy. Todd and his friends Lucy Robinson and Josh Anderson spot Nancy in a car park and confront. At first she is defensive, telling them that Alec deserves to be in trouble and just wanted to give him a scare. Todd and Josh explain Nancy could be charged herself and agrees to go to the police station to tell the truth.
4 October 1991 – 2 April 1992	Trish Longley	Susan Ellis	A student at Erinsborough High who begins bullying Phoebe Bright. She briefly dates Josh Anderson. When Dorothy Burke begins casting the Year 11 play "Beauty and the Beast" Trish is cast as the female lead but is replaced by Phoebe after missing so many cues during audition. Trish later reappears when Josh and Todd Landers have a dinner party and Josh invites her as Todd's date. Trish is rude to Phoebe all evening, making it clear she is still interested in Josh and blames Phoebe for stealing him and at dessert, Phoebe snaps and pushes the pudding into her face. Josh momentarily reunites with Trish, after finding that Todd and Phoebe are together. After Trish frames Phoebe for stealing an exam paper, nearly getting her expelled, she and Josh break up when the truth is revealed. Trish blames Josh for reporting her.
8 October	Bill Pearson	Laurie Dobson	Melanie Pearson's family who attend her wedding to Joe Mangel. While Mrs Pearson is frantic trying to organise everything, Bill takes a cooler approach than his wife and is calmer and offers to make tea for everyone and plays with Joe's adoptive daughter Sky. Melanie's sister, Justine is attracted to Glen Donnelly who is uninterested in her but after Justine catches the bouquet, she is able to drag Glen off for a dance.
8 October	Mrs Pearson	Leanne Bilson	Melanie Pearson's family who attend her wedding to Joe Mangel. While Mrs Pearson is frantic trying to organise everything, Bill takes a cooler approach than his wife and is calmer and offers to make tea for everyone and plays with Joe's adoptive daughter Sky. Melanie's sister, Justine is attracted to Glen Donnelly who is uninterested in her but after Justine catches the bouquet, she is able to drag Glen off for a dance.
8 October	Justine Pearson	Kate Johnstone	Melanie Pearson's family who attend her wedding to Joe Mangel. While Mrs Pearson is frantic trying to organise everything, Bill takes a cooler approach than his wife and is calmer and offers to make tea for everyone and plays with Joe's adoptive daughter Sky. Melanie's sister, Justine is attracted to Glen Donnelly who is uninterested in her but after Justine catches the bouquet, she is able to drag Glen off for a dance.
24 October 1991 – 28 January 1992	Meredith Downes	Lois Collinder	An old friend of Dorothy Burke. It transpires that both had been arrested for drug possession in the 1960s at a peace rally. Several months later, Dorothy and Brenda Riley compete against Meredith and her husband, Ted in a radio quiz and are victorious.
29 October	George Pappas	Stan Tsitas	George auditions for the role of the beast in Year 11's production of Beauty and the Beast. His insults to Phoebe Bright annoy her and Josh Anderson beats him up, prompting him to drop out of the play.
30 October–27 November	Martin Tyrell	Nicholas Bell	Martin temporarily replaces Caroline Alessi as Assistant manager of Lassiter's. When Caroline returns he mistakes her for a secretary and there is animosity between the two but when Martin comes to Caroline's aid when she begins having severe stomach pains. Caroline is having sympathetic labour pains as her twin sister Christina is about to give birth. When the baby is born, Caroline and Martin get caught up in the emotion and kiss. They begin a relationship but Caroline discovers Martin is married, but he tells her he and his wife, Shelley are separated. However this is proven to be a lie and Martin decides to reconcile with Shelley, breaking Caroline's heart.
4–19 November	Paige Sneddon	Tracy Callender	Paige owns a local surf shop and hires Brad Willis after hearing about his skills at surfing and board design. When a customer brings in one of Brad's old boards, claiming he bought it from the shop, Brad is suspicious and confronts Paige. Piage then quickly blames a former employee. When Brad's boards are stolen from his garage, Guy Carpenter is a suspect as he has a half-coin pendant similar to the one left at the scene of the crime but quickly explains that someone had given it to him. Guy spots Paige and Brad on a date and recognizes Paige as a woman he previously dated as she gave him a half-coin pendant and held onto the other half and works out that Paige robbed Brad. Brad accuses Guy of lying and trying to steal his girlfriend but finds the boards in Paige's garage and she tries to apologise but Brad refuses to listen. Brad then dumps Paige, who then blames an unsympathetic Guy and attacks him in the Coffee Shop but is quickly restrained by Glen Donnelly.
8–12 November	Heather O'Toole	Michelle Royal	An Advertising agent. When Glen Donnelly drops off advert submissions from Lucy Robinson and Emma Gordon at the agency, Heather tries to recruit Glen, who is reluctant but becomes interested. Gaby Willis spots Glen and Heather together and is not pleased. Glen sets Gaby straight that there is nothing going on with him and Heather. Heather calls Lucy and invites her for interview at the agency saying she loves her advert and offers a job, but Lucy and Emma's submissions are mixed up. Lucy tries to confess but before she can, Heather is distracted by a phone call and is put on the spot to accept which she does. Feeling guilty, Lucy confesses to Heather, who calls Emma offering her the job instead.
13 November	Ice Cream Vendor	Dino Nicolosi	A passing Ice Cream man who Paul Robinson and his pregnant wife, Christina flag down when their car runs out of petrol en route to hospital. The vendor is not keen at first but relents when Paul offers to buy every ice cream in the van and drives the couple to hospital.
14 November	Mrs Huxley	Bobby Connelly	The mother of Rebecca Huxley who Todd Landers has been speaking to online. When Todd arrives at her home to meet Rebecca, she breaks the news that Rebecca died the night before.
15 November 1991 – 22 January 1992	Nev Cusack	Jim Ewing	A colleague of Doug Willis. Doug introduces him to his sister Faye Hudson and they get along well much to the surprise of the rest of Faye's family. Within days of meeting each other, Nev and Faye go away on holiday together. On their return, Faye announce their engagement. However, on the morning of the wedding, Nev has second thoughts and confides in Doug that he cannot go through with the wedding and asks him to break the news to Faye, which Doug Does, devastating her.
20–21 November	Kirk Mansfield	Jay Hackett	Kirk arrives at Lassiter's looking for a Limousine to hire. Paul points him in the direction of Home James, his grandmother Helen Daniels' company. Kirk returns and offers Paul a stock tip and suggests he buys shares in Electro-Machine Holdings'. Paul takes the tip and invests, thanking Kirk. Kirk and then Paul have a business lunch and talk hotel expansion. When Paul leaves, Councillor Felicity Brent arrives to talk to Kirk. Paul finds out the shares he bought are worthless and Felicity arrives at his house to thank him for being nice to Kirk, revealing that he is her nephew.
20 November	Shelley Tyrell	Kate Langbroek	Martin Tyrell's estranged wife. She arrives to visit him at when he is working at Lassiter's and they discuss their marriage and children. Later, when Martin is in the shower, Caroline Alessi answers the door to Shelley who has arrived with her and Martin's children. Shelley then leaves distraught, but within a matter of days, Martin and Shelley reunite.
29 November–4 December	Ashley Denton	Steve Kidd	Ashley begins taking photos of Lucy Robinson and following her. When Lucy falls over and twists her ankle, Ashley finds her and takes her back to his house where has several photos of her and is convinced she is a woman named Claire. Lucy, afraid, tries to flee but Ashley keeps her detained. Ashley then forces Lucy to try on a wedding dress. Lucy then convinces Ashley to put on his tuxedo and tries to flee while he is changing but is caught. Ashley, enraged ties Lucy to a chair and gags her. Josh Anderson knocks at the house while looking for Lucy and Ashley is short with him and slams the door in his face. Undeterred, Josh returns after finding Lucy's earring outside and forces his way in, punches Ashley and frees Lucy.
10 December 1991 – 3 March 1992	Sid Butcher	Roy Thompson	Guy Carpenter's boss at the local swimming pool. Sid constantly criticizes Guy's work and Guy immediately resigns. Guy's aunt Brenda Riley, spins Sid a story about Guy's dog dying and Sid asks Guy to reconsider quitting and return, which he does. Several months later, Sid is furious when Guy fails to show up for a meeting and refuses to believe his story about rescuing Helen Daniels from nearly being gassed in her own garage. Guy, enraged pushes Sid, who then fires him.
12 December 1991, 13–14 December 1993	Santa Claus	Richard Hutson	A local mall Santa who comes to the Coffee Shop on Christmas Eve. He talks to Brenda Riley and he asks her what she wants for Christmas, to which she replies several hunks. Three bodybuilders later enter the shop much to Brenda's delight. Two years later, Santa reappears at Eden Mall and tells a bickering Debbie Martin and Danni Stark to be nice to each other. When Santa's sack of toys is stolen, Debbie and Danni work together to replace them and he is grateful and tells them they are special people.
