= Benito Alessi =

- Neighbours character
- Portrayed by: George Spartels
- Duration: 1992–1993
- First appearance: 28 July 1992
- Last appearance: 28 May 1993
- Introduced by: Don Battye
In-universe information
- Occupation: Manager of The Robinson Corporation and Lassiters Hotel; Co-owner of Carpenter's Cars
- Father: Benito Alessi Sr.
- Brothers: Frank Alessi
- Wife: Cathy Alessi
- Sons: Marco Alessi; Rick Alessi
- Daughters: Lindsay Steiner
- Nieces: Christina Alessi; Caroline Alessi
- Other relatives: Andrew Robinson

Benito Alessi is a fictional character from the Australian soap opera Neighbours, played by George Spartels. Benito was introduced along with his wife and two sons, following the announcement of several cast departures. Spartels was glad to bring something different to the show as part of the first family with Italian heritage. He thought the introduction of the Alessis showed viewers "a broader picture" of Australia, after the show was criticised for not accurately representing suburban life. He made his first appearance during the episode broadcast on 28 July 1992.

Benito was described as being "typically Italian" by writer Josephine Monroe. He wants his sons to excel in everything they do, but is left disappointed. The character has a comedic rivalry with business partner Lou Carpenter (Tom Oliver), which Spartels enjoyed playing. Benito and Cathy's marriage is tested by her desire to have another child, Benito's secret vasectomy and the revelation that they had a daughter, who was placed for adoption. Spartels chose to leave the serial to record a children's music album and his final scenes aired on 28 May 1993.

== Casting ==
The arrival of the new Alessi family was confirmed in the 11 July 1992 issue of TV Week. Di Stanley reported that George Spartels and Elspeth Ballantyne were "in charge of the clan" as parents Benito and Cathy Alessi, whose teenage sons Marco Alessi (Felice Arena) and Rick Alessi (Dan Falzon) had previously been introduced. The Alessi family's introduction followed the announced departures of several regular characters. They were the first "truly ethnic family group" to be introduced into the cast, and were given immediate links within the series as relations of sisters Caroline Alessi (Gillian Blakeney) and Christina Alessi (Gayle Blakeney). Spartels relished the challenge of portraying a member of the Alessi family, explaining "Being half Greek myself – and knowing lots of Italians and Greeks – I thought it was interesting to bring a different flavour to the show." He also believed the introduction of the Alessis was "a sign of maturity" and a chance for viewers to see "a broader picture" of Australia, after the show was criticised for not representing suburban life as it was at the time.

== Development ==
Writing in the Neighbours Programme Guide, author Josephine Monroe said Benito was a second generation Italian immigrant. He is "typically Italian" and wants his sons to excel in everything they do, however, after realising that Marco will always be a drifter, Benito invests more in his younger son. Benito is disappointed when Rick proves that he is not academically gifted and Benito is further shamed when Rick is expelled from his boarding school. Producers established a rivalry between Benito and Lou Carpenter (Tom Oliver) when they go into business together selling cars. Monroe observed: "The two men's sales styles clashed badly! Benito disapproved of Lou's sleazy ocker pitch, and Lou thought Benito was too gentlemanly to sell beers to a drunk!" Spartels picked Benito and Lou's comedic rivalry as one of his favourite storylines, along with Benito's secretary Gaby Willis' (Rachel Blakely) reinvention as a "wild-haired rock chick".

Benito and Cathy's marriage is tested by her desire to have another child, forcing Benito to reveal that he had had a vasectomy years earlier. Spartels called the storyline "unforgettable". He said that he did not have to research it too much, as it was a subject he was uncomfortable about, which made it "unnerving" to act out on-screen. The couple's fictional backstory was then explored when it emerged that Cathy had given birth to a daughter when they were sixteen. As they came from respectable families, Cathy and Benito were forced to place the baby for adoption. Producers soon introduced the couple's daughter Lindsay Steiner (Jane Longhurst), leading to arguments with Marco, who always thought he was Cathy's oldest child. Arena said the scenes involved "lots of shouting and slamming of doors".

Benito, Cathy and Marco were only on the show for a year. The characters were not written out. Spartels had been a presenter on Play School prior to joining Neighbours, so when he was offered the chance to record a children's music album, he had to choose between remaining on the show or recording the album. Spartels decided to leave Neighbours, which he admitted he was sad about, as he felt his character was "hitting his stride". Spartels did not regret his decision to leave, as it led to a successful music career, but he found that he missed Neighbours. He added that if he was offered a role in a soap opera again, he would accept it. On-screen, Benito is offered a job in Sydney and he travels there for an interview with Cathy and Rick, who they cannot trust to be alone. The scenes were filmed in Manly on 8 March 1993. Spartels, Ballantyne and Falzon also shot scenes aboard a Sydney ferry, as Benito tries persuading Cathy and Rick to move. The storyline led to confirmation that Neighbours was a Melbourne show. As Benito and Cathy move to the city, Rick opts to stay behind in Erinsborough.

== Storylines ==
Benito was born to Italian parents, he met Cathy when they were at school. Cathy fell pregnant when she was sixteen and she and Benito were forced to place their daughter for adoption. Benito and Cathy married and had two sons Marco and Rick. Benito makes sure he provides his sons with a secure future. When Marco leaves school to travel, Benito puts his efforts into ensuring that Rick will succeed at school instead. However, Rick is expelled from his boarding school and is forced to enrol at Erinsborough High, which disappoints Benito.

Benito's niece Christina Alessi and her husband Paul Robinson (Stefan Dennis) lease Number 22 Ramsay Street to him and Cathy. Paul gives Benito a job managing the Robinson Corporation and Lassiter's Hotel. Benito clashes with both Jim Robinson (Alan Dale) and Doug Willis (Terence Donovan) and he is not popular with his secretaries, Gaby Willis and Julie Martin (Julie Mullins). Julie believes that her husband should have got Benito's job and when she sees him spending time at Lou Carpenter's car yard, where he owns shares, she tells Paul. Paul then sacks Benito. Benito does not mind too much as he grows to love working at the car yard. However, Lou is less happy with Benito's commitment to the car yard as he does not like Benito's attitude to car sales and his uptight attitude. They decide to paint a white line down the middle of the car yard, to divide it between them. They come to realise that they are being stupid and make up.

When Rick and Debbie Martin (Marnie Reece-Wilmore) win tickets to see Michael Jackson in London, Benito forbids Rick from going. Cathy forms a plan with Helen Daniels (Anne Haddy) and they agree to accompany Rick and Debbie to London without Benito's knowledge. Benito is angry when he learns the truth and he grounds Rick upon his return and bans him from seeing Debbie. He later gives in and allows them to keep dating. Cathy tells Benito that she wants another baby and he tries to talk her out of it. Benito reveals that he had a vasectomy after Rick was born, which surprises Cathy. He then agrees to have the vasectomy reversed, but on the same day that Benito leaves hospital, Cathy is told that she is unable to have any more children. Benito and Cathy tell Marco and Rick about the daughter they gave away and Marco decides to find her. He brings Lindsay (Jane Longhurst) to dinner one evening and tells his parents who she is. Benito and Cathy meet with Lindsay and explain why she was placed for adoption.

Benito is offered a job in Sydney and he and Cathy agree to move. Benito is keen to impress his first clients, some Japanese businessmen, and he asks for Gaby's help. Gaby, her boyfriend Wayne Duncan (Jonathan Sammy Lee) and his brother, Troy (Damian Walshe-Howling), take the businessmen out on the town. Benito is furious when he finds out what the Duncan brothers are going to show the businessmen, but he is happy when he lands the account. Benito then says goodbye to Gaby, Wayne and Troy and they return to Erinsborough.

== Reception ==
The character's profile on BBC Online states that his most notable moment was "Admitting to Cathy that he'd had a vasectomy without her knowledge." Writer Josephine Monroe thought the "childishness" between Benito and Lou was "hilarious". Jason Herbison of Inside Soap commented that Spartels "brought a welcome bit of Greek flavour to Ramsay Street", while the Alessi family "added much-needed spice" to the show. Writing in Small Screens – Essays on Contemporary Australian Television, David Nichols found Benito's persona was similar to the angry, ethnic father trope, calling him "an easily angered patriarch in conflict with what were presented as everyday 'Australian' mores".
