= Rick Alessi =

- Neighbours character
- Portrayed by: Dan Falzon
- Duration: 1992–1995
- First appearance: 8 June 1992
- Last appearance: 10 March 1995
- Introduced by: Don Battye
In-universe information
- Occupation: Student; Coffee Shop waiter and manager; Kitchen hand; Barman; Personal assistant
- Father: Benito Alessi
- Mother: Cathy Alessi
- Brothers: Marco Alessi
- Sisters: Lindsay Steiner
- Grandfathers: Benito Alessi Sr.
- Uncles: Frank Alessi
- First cousins: Christina Alessi; Caroline Alessi
- Other relatives: Andrew Robinson

Rick Alessi is a fictional character from the Australian soap opera Neighbours, played by Dan Falzon. He made his first screen appearance during the episode broadcast on 8 June 1992. Rick and his family were introduced to the show following several cast departures. The character remained on-screen until 9 March 1995.

== Casting ==
The Alessi family were introduced in 1992 following the announced departures of several regular characters. The family were the first "truly ethnic" group to be introduced into the cast. Falzon was seventeen when he won the role of Rick. He told a writer for Inside Soap that Neighbours was the biggest thing he had ever done and added "Neighbours is such a big show and Rick is such a great character." Shortly after Rick's arrival in Ramsay Street, he was followed by his mother and father to form the Alessi family. Falzon promised the family and their storylines would keep viewers glued to the screen. Within a year, the entire Alessi family had departed, leaving only Rick behind.

== Development ==
=== Characterisation ===
"He comes across as immature, but the truth is he's just trying to hide his feelings. However when the chips are down, he will always fight for his family and friends."

— An Inside Soap writer on Rick

After Rick was thrown out of his posh school for being a tearaway, he decided to go to Erinsborough to stay with his older brother, Marco (Felice Arena), and cousin, Christina (Gayle Blakeney). Lisa Anthony from BIG! magazine reported that Rick's father, Benito (George Spartels), would ruin Rick's hopes of finding a job after he enrols him at Erinsborough High. Anthony added that "the scene is set for battles with Mrs Burke". A writer for Inside Soap commented that Rick came to Erinsborough with "a reputation and a chip on his shoulder." His rebellious attitude was mostly due to his parents' high expectations of him. They pushed him to do well at school, like Marco. Rick was described as being bright and someone who cannot help himself from getting into trouble. Falzon stated "He's a practical joker with a total dislike for authority."

At the start of 1994, Neighbours wanted "a younger, livelier look, with six regular characters under the age of 18" and Rick became part of the show's new "brat pack", along with Debbie Martin (Marnie Reece-Wilmore), Michael Martin (Troy Beckwith), Cody Willis (Peta Brady), Brett Stark (Brett Blewitt), and Danni Stark (Eliza Szonert).

=== Sally Pritchard ===
When Rick spotted Sally Pritchard (Brenda Webb) in Ramsay Street, he was immediately attracted to her and became determined to find out more about her. The following day at school, Rick learned that Sally was Erinsborough High's new Japanese teacher. An Inside Soap columnist revealed "Poor Rick can barely conceal his infatuation and immediately enrols for Japanese classes!" Sally soon noticed Rick and she became attracted to him too. She then struggled to keep their relationship on a strictly teacher-pupil basis. Rick's crush on Sally became stronger and he decided to apply for a job at The Waterhole, believing that if he was no longer Sally's pupil there would be no professional conflict of interest and they could be together.

=== Car accident ===
After Rick's father sent him some money for his birthday, he went and bought a car. Rick's school friends, Lenny Hooper (Jamie Churchill) and Gary Briggs (Jamie McGrath), were not impressed and gave Rick grief about it. Rick then challenged them to a drag race, which he lost. However, Rick's disappointment soon turned to "horror" when the car carrying Lenny, Briggs and Danni Stark (Eliza Szonert) crashed and Briggs was killed. Falzon admitted the storyline was one of his best as it dealt with the "meaty subject" of reckless driving. Rick was devastated by the crash and found himself ostracised by his friends, before being charged with dangerous driving.

=== Departure ===
Falzon quit Neighbours in January 1995. He told Inside Soap's Richard Arnold that he thought hard about his future and what he wanted to do next, admitting it took a lot of courage to leave the show. Falzon continued, "I had a phenomenal run on the show and leaving was a big decision to make but there comes a time when you know that it's finally right." Before his departure, Falzon had become one of the longest-serving cast members. On-screen, Rick's exit saw him leave Erinsborough for a job at Lassiter's Hotel in Darwin. Falzon thought Rick left like "a true romantic hero – but with the girl!"

== Storylines ==
Rick is Benito and Cathy Alessi's (Elspeth Ballantyne) youngest son. He attended a private boarding school, but he did not like it and was eventually kicked out. Rick goes to Daphne's Coffee Shop where his brother, Marco is working and asks him for a job. Rick then starts at Erinsborough High where the principal, Dorothy Burke (Maggie Dence) is more than a match for him. Rick and Marco soon lodge with Cameron Hudson (Benjamin Grant Mitchell) in Ramsay Street. When Debbie Martin (Marnie Reece-Wilmore) moves back to the area with her family, Rick is attracted to her and they begin dating. When Benito and Cathy move into 22 Ramsay Street, Rick and Marco join them.

Rick wins a radio contest where the prize is to win tickets to see Michael Jackson, who is touring in support of his album Dangerous in concert in London and invites Debbie with him. Rick knows Benito would not allow him to go away alone with Debbie, so Marco and Helen Daniels (Anne Haddy)' Debbie's step-great-grandmother hatch a scheme to get the couple to London without Benito or Julie (Julie Mullins), Debbie's stepmother finding out. The plan is for Marco to chaperon Rick and Helen and Debbie to invent an outback painting holiday. The plan works until news of the couple giving away their concert tickets to terminally ill Leukemia patient Terry Carter (Lee Cheesewright) ends up on The Casey Butler show, a British talk show, which goes to air in Australia which is seen by Benito and Julie who try to keep the couple apart on their return to Australia.

When Debbie catches Rick allegedly in a steamy clinch with Annalise Hartman (Kimberly Davies) at Number 22, she promptly storms out. Rick then explains that he invented an affair with Annalise in order to get out going Italy with his parents for the holidays. Debbie is quick to apologize. A spanner is thrown into the works when Rick's aunt Margaret (Bev Gardiner) arrives to stay with him during the holidays. Rick schemes to get rid of her by writing a letter that is allegedly her from her husband, Rick's uncle Frank (Bob Ruggiero) wanting her to return home.

When Benito lands a job in Sydney, he plans for the whole family to leave Erinsborough but Rick does not want to leave Debbie. Worried that they will be separate Rick and Debbie decide to have sex while babysitting Hope Gottlieb one night. This phase in their relationship led to Rick resolving to stay in Erinsborough so that he can be with Debbie, and he arranges for an AusStudy grant to support himself and a part-time job at Lassiter's Hotel as a kitchen hand in exchange for lodgings in the staff quarters. Rick's parents are unhappy with his decision but realize their son is old enough to make his own decisions. Cathy leaves Rick a secret bank account only they know about.

Rick and Debbie later have problems in their relationship when Debbie becomes infatuated with Harvey Johnson and she and Rick later split but remain friends. Rick tries to learn to drive but doesn't have an instructor and uses a dummy he names 'Roy' to ride in the front passenger seat. It soon backfires when people realise what Rick is doing and Rick gets rid of Roy and throws the dummy over the cliff but accidentally totals Lou Carpenter's (Tom Oliver) car. Rick then explains to an irate Lou who makes him pay off his debt by working unpaid at his car yard. Cathy returns and sees Rick is tired from the various jobs he is working and wants him to return with her to Sydney. Rick wants to stay in Erinsborough, so Lou agrees to let him move in and the two build up a bond.

When Debbie falls for ex-con Darren Stark (Scott Major), Rick knows Darren is just stringing Debbie along but she accuses Rick of being jealous when he tells her so. Rick's suspicions about Darren are confirmed when he catches him kissing Debbie's arch-enemy Louise Barker (Katrina McEwan). Rick visits Debbie's brother, Michael Martin (Troy Beckwith) in the detention centre where Darren had also been incarcerated, and Michael reveals to Rick that Darren has a grudge against him and was plans to involve Debbie in a petrol station robbery. Rick helps Michael to escape the detention centre and the two rush to rescue Debbie from being an accessory to Darren's crime. In the confusion, Michael is shot by the cashier and Darren makes a run for it but Rick catches and restrains him until the police arrives. Debbie realizes Rick was right about Darren and apologizes for her treatment of Rick.

Rick drops out of school to run the Coffee Shop for Cathy after Phoebe and Stephen Gottlieb move away but Rick manages to upset the established the staff. Within days of his arrival at the shop he sacks Annalise, and halves Kristy's (Jodie Haigh) hours. Debbie agrees to help Rick out during the holidays and hits on a winning formula using Helen's recipe for shepherd's pie. Things backfire when Rick and Debbie oversalt the pie leaving it inedible. Rick's management skills worsen when he buys a large amount of food extender which turns out to be a waste of money. After adding food dye to liven up the menu and make the food look more attractive, the plan goes awry when Nicholas Greenway (Justin D'Orazio) suffers a seizure. Rick then resigns as manager and returns to school.

Year 9 student Ally Slater (Bryony Price) falls for Rick which he dismisses as a crush but Ally tells her friends that she is dating Rick and they want proof so Ally conspires with her brother Sean to get the necklace by putting herbal tonic in Rick's drink. It soon emerges that Ally is seeking attention during the wake of her parents' messy separation, and Rick lends a sympathetic ear. When Cody Willis (Peta Brady) returns to Ramsay Street after two years in America, Rick is instantly smitten. Although Cody is attracted to Rick, she is going through a separation. When Rick returns from spending Christmas in Hong Kong, he is unhappy to find that Cody is dating Michael. However, Cody is still attracted to Rick and they kiss which Michael witnesses. Rick and Cody agree to spare Michael any more upset by cooling off for a while.

After receiving a car for his 18th birthday, Rick boasts about its speed and is challenged to a drag race by schoolmates Lenny Hooper and Gary Briggs. Rick reluctantly accepts and Cody joins him. In the ensuing race, Briggs dies when the car carrying him, Lenny and Danni Stark crashes. Rick is then charged with reckless driving, leaving him feeling guilty. A memorial service is held at school for Briggs and his father, Alan (Eric Donnison) menaces Rick over his son's death. Lou and Cody are on hand to help Rick get over the events.

Rick later moves out of Number 24 when Lou's partner Cheryl Stark (Caroline Gillmer) and her children Danni and Brett (Brett Blewitt) move in causing the house to become overcrowded. Rick moves in with Mark Gottlieb (Bruce Samazan) and Annalise. Rick's relationship with Cody is tested when Rick's language teacher Sally Pritchard and Cassandra Rushmore (Radha Mitchell) enter the equation. After scoring a job working for Cody's sister Gaby (Rachel Blakely) at Lassiter's in Darwin, Rick bids Erinsborough an emotional goodbye. He and Cody then end things after a long-distance relationship fails. A year later when Cody is killed in a siege with drug dealers, Rick sends a message to the memorial service which is read by Hannah Martin (Rebecca Ritters), detailing how he never stopped loving Cody even though they were parted by distance.

== Reception ==
For his portrayal of Rick, Falzon received a nomination for Most Popular Actor at the 1st National Television Awards. A writer for the BBC's Neighbours website said Rick's most notable moment was "Winning a trip to London to see Michael Jackson with Debbie Martin." During a feature on the show, Joanna Murray-Smith from The Age commented "With the exception of Rick Alessi, the one major failure of current Neighbours is the absence of young male spunks". Murray-Smith's colleague, Kate Langbroek, called Rick the "resident dope". While Ian Hyland, writing for the Sunday Mirror, branded Rick a "hearthrob" [sic].
