= Marco Alessi =

- Neighbours character
- Portrayed by: Felice Arena
- First appearance: 5 May 1992
- Last appearance: 18 November 1992
- Introduced by: Don Battye
In-universe information
- Occupation: Waiter
- Father: Benito Alessi
- Mother: Cathy Alessi
- Brothers: Rick Alessi
- Sisters: Lindsay Steiner
- Uncles: Frank Alessi
- First cousins: Christina Alessi; Caroline Alessi
- Other relatives: Andrew Robinson

Marco Alessi is a fictional character from the Australian soap opera Neighbours, played by Felice Arena. He made his first screen appearance as Marco during the episode broadcast on 5 May 1992. Marco was the first character introduced from the show's new Alessi family. He joined cousins and established characters Caroline Alessi (Gillian Blakeney) and Christina Robinson (Gayle Blakeney) in Ramsay Street. His parents Benito (George Spartels) and Cathy Alessi (Elspeth Ballantyne) with sibling Rick Alessi (Dan Falzon) soon followed. Arena was happy to portray an Italian character because it resembled himself - noting that characters of a different ethnicity were rare on the show.

The character is passionate about everything he chooses to do. He has a big ego and a lot of pride. Marco's first storyline was an unrequited love with Beth Brennan (Natalie Imbruglia). Marco has an "Italian hotheadedness" character trait that leads him into trouble where money is concerned. His involvement with loan sharks builds up to his departure storyline. Off-screen Arena had decided to leave the show and Marco last appeared on-screen in the episode dated 18 November 1992.

== Development ==
=== Introduction and family ===
Arena played Marco during 1992. He previously played the bit part of Bob Cooper in the serial, after winning a talent-spotting competition. Arena had to audition in front of a casting director and Neighbours cast members. A year later, he was offered the role of Marco. The role "fell into his lap" after he auditioned for the serial on four separate occasions. The timing was "perfect" as he had recently returned to Australia, following a trip to Hollywood in an effort to secure work. He stated "I really believe it was fate, going back there then. Thank God I bombed out in Hollywood, otherwise I wouldn't be here now."

Alex Cramb from Inside Soap detailed how as Elspeth Ballantyne had been cast as Cathy Alessi, the head of the show's "hottest new family". She brings her two "hunky" sons Marco and younger brother Rick Alessi (Dan Falzon). Marco was the first member of the new Alessi family to arrive in Ramsay Street. He joined his cousins and already established characters Caroline Alessi (Gillian Blakeney) and Christina Robinson (Gayle Blakeney) on-screen. Rick along with mother and father, Cathy and Benito (George Spartels) soon followed. Born to Italian parents, Arena was delighted to portray a character with a similar background to his own. He stated that "it's a real breakthrough and about time, I'm not your usual Aussie surfer type." He was not nervous about joining the cast. But on his first day of filming he became nervous during scenes in the Coffee Shop. But Marco secures a job as a waiter there and Arena told an Inside Soap writer that a majority of his scenes occurred on that particular set.

Marco develops feelings for Beth Brennan (Natalie Imbruglia) following an "instant attraction" and a "stolen kiss". Arena stated that Marco is "obsessed" with Beth even though she does not reciprocate. The kiss leads to nothing but Marco remains confident he can change her mind. Arena explained "he's passionate about everything he does, but he's got an ego and a certain amount of pride that won't allow him to admit to himself that maybe this is a lost cause." Marco then believes that changing his hair and picking the correct attire could make himself more appealing to her. But Arena concluded that Marco is ultimately in for disappointment where Beth is concerned.

Monroe said that Marco's "family ties were tested to the limit" when he learns that Christina's husband Paul (Stefan Dennis), has kissed Caroline. She added Marco "was so upset" by the betrayal and seeing Christina hurt. He threatens to tell the truth but Paul guilts him into silence, reminding him that the truth will hurt more.

Marco and Rick notice Cathy becoming broody around Phoebe Bright (Simone Robertson) and she decides that she wants another child. Her behaviour results in her admitting that she had a daughter, who was adopted out. Arena told Josephine Monroe from Inside Soap that her confession hurts Marco the most because he always believed himself to be Cathy's oldest child. The Alessi's decide that it is best forget about it, but Marco cannot. Arena explained that "Marco becomes very secretive" and starts searching for his sister. Rick pleads with Marco not to fearing it will destroy the family, but he is stubborn and continues the search. Arena added "Marco's really pissed off that they never told him and he's especially hurt that his mum kept a secret from him because his mum is his best friend." The adoption agency locate her, now living as Lindsay Steiner (Jane Longhurst). She refuses to return contact with Marco. Monroe noted that Marco is "deeply disappointed" because he has expected to have an "instant rapport" with his long lost sister. But Lindsay later begins to follow Marco around. When he discovers her identity he decides to introduce her to Cathy and Benito. Arena billed the scenes as "lots of shouting and slamming of doors" which he enjoyed playing. He credited the scenes as his favourite and working so closely with Ballantyne and Spartels created his best acting work.

=== Departure ===
Arena decided to leave Neighbours because he was unhappy with his character's first storylines. He filmed his final scenes in October. He told Mark McGowan from TV Week that "I sat down with the producers and the writers and it was decided the storylines weren't going to go on. They are leaving it open for the character to return". "Neighbours: The First 10 Years" author Josephine Monroe detailed how Marco's "Italian hotheadedness" would get him into trouble where money was concerned. Despite not being able to afford designer luxuries Marco would ensure that he purchased them. Monroe added that it was only a matter of time before he found himself in debt. But with a disciplinarian father like Benito he cannot not request money and turns to loan sharks to pay his way. This saw the transition of debt to trouble as Marco is pursued by the "loan shark's heavies" daily. Marco's exit storyline saw him traveling to London with Rick and Debbie Martin (Marnie Reece-Wilmore) to watch Michael Jackson on tour. But Marco decides not to return to Australia to escape the loan sharks. Arena later told Heather Gallagher from The Age that "he ran the coffee shop and he was on for an entire year and he was a good guy until they turned him into a gangster." Rick was soon the only remaining Alessi in the show. Falzon admitted he missed working with Arena and the comedy he brought to the role.

== Storylines ==
Marco first appears when he is mistaken for a burglar at Number 32 Ramsay Street by Faye Hudson (Lorraine Bayly). Faye's brother, Doug Willis (Terence Donovan), rushes to her aid and confronts Marco. Marco explains that he thought that Number 32 was where his cousin Christina and her husband Paul lived. After settling in with the family at Number 22, Marco helps out in the coffee shop and befriends several of the locals including Brad Willis (Scott Michaelson), Lucy Robinson (Melissa Bell) and Beth Brennan. One day, Marco accidentally overhears Christina's sister, Caroline's conversation with Paul about a kiss they shared. Marco threatens to tell Christina everything unless Caroline comes clean. This results in Caroline fleeing to Milan.

When Paul and Caroline's affair is revealed over Andrew's (Shannon Holmes) baby monitor, Christina throws Paul out and takes legal proceedings against him. Marco is then asked to testify in court about Paul harassing Christina but cannot lie under oath when the judge asks whether Paul has been aggressive to Christina, as Marco has seen no such evidence. When Beth moves to Erinsborough full-time, Marco is smitten with her but she rejects his advances as she prefers Brad. Rick, Marco's teenage brother, arrives in Ramsay Street after being expelled from boarding school and asks him for a job. Marco refuses and insists Rick attend Erinsborough High School. The brothers later move in with Cameron Hudson (Benjamin Grant Mitchell) at Number 32 in order to give Paul and Christina some space to reconcile.

Benito and Cathy arrive in Ramsay Street to get Rick to come home but with very little success. In the end, The Alessis move into Number 22 after Paul and Christina renew their vows and move to Hawaii. After hearing his parents talk about a daughter they gave up for adoption when they were only 16, Marco goes to track down his sister, Lindsay. Marco brings Lindsay home and Benito and Cathy assume that she is Marco's girlfriend. The truth is revealed and things are awkward between Marco and his parents for a while, but Lindsay agrees to keep in touch with her new family. Marco finds himself indebted to loan sharks who make threats against him and his family including phone calls and vandalising the house. When Rick and Debbie win tickets to see Michael Jackson in London, Marco agrees to go as Rick's chaperone and disappears. Benito and Cathy are relieved to hear he is staying with relatives in Italy and later visit him in Milan.

== Reception ==
The BBC said Marco's most notable moment was "Finding his long lost sister who was adopted out by his parents before he was born." Author Josephine Monroe said "it didn't take much brain power to guess that beautiful Caroline and Christina Alessi came from good looking stock, but when their cousins Marco and Rick arrived in Ramsay Street the viewers went wild for their hunky Italian looks." An Inside Soap reporter said that Arena's "latin looks" could "break a few hearts" – but as "Marco Alessi, Felice's less lucky. A loser in the romance stakes." Jason Herbison of the same publication branded him a "lovable Coffee Shop assistant", and said that Marco "had us laughing and crying with his hare-brained schemes." Herbison also noted that despite only being in the show for just over six months, Arena acquired "an army of female fans."
