= Elspeth Ballantyne =

Australian actress (born 1939)

- Born: 1939 (aged 86-87); Adelaide, South Australia, Australia
- Education: Wilderness School; NIDA (1959–1960)
- Occupation: Actress
- Years active: 1954–2013, 2022–
- Known for: Prisoner (aka Prisoner: Cell Block H); Neighbours; Boronia Boys/Boronia Backpackers; Bellbird
- Spouse: Dennis Miller (m. 1968; div. 1977)
- Children: 2

Elspeth Ballantyne (born 1939 (Note: one reference (AustLit) states was aged 22 in 1963, so possibly born in 1940 or 1941, meaning age could indicate between 84-86)) is an Australian theatre, television and film actress with a career spanning 60 years. She is best known for her roles in TV serials Bellbird as Laura 'Lori' Chandler from 1967 to 1971, and Prisoner as Meg Jackson (later Morris) from 1979 to 1986.

== Early life ==
Elspeth Ballantyne was born in Adelaide, South Australia, to show business parents, Gwenneth Ballantyne (nee Richmond), an actress and teacher, and Colin George Sandergrove Ballantyne, a prominent theatre entrepreneur. She grew up alongside her brother, Guy and sister, Jane who was eight years younger.

Her father began his career as a photographer. He took a hiatus to serve in the war for the first three years of his daughter's life, before resuming his photography career, while working in amateur theatre. He subsequently became a stage actor, producer and director, and later founded the South Australian Theatre Company (the predecessor of the State Theatre Company). Ballantyne's father educated his children about Shakespeare, Jonson, Ibsen, Chekhov and Strindberg.

As children, Ballantyne and her brother appeared as extras in plays by her father. She played the apparition of Macbeth in a 1947 production of Macbeth, alongside her mother as Lady Macduff. As a teen, she played competition tennis and rode horses and attended the Wilderness School.

Ballantyne was not initially inspired to take up acting as a career, instead, becoming a laboratory technician at the Royal Adelaide Hospital. Professor Robert Quentin from the University of NSW suggested she audition for the National Institute of Dramatic Art (NIDA). She was awarded a scholarship and was part of NIDA's first intake in 1959, graduating with a Diploma of Dramatic Art in 1960.

After her graduation, Ballantyne's father wanted her to join the Young Elizabethans, but she chose to work with Raymond Westwell and Joan MacArthur in Perth while they were establishing the National Theatre Company.

== Career ==
Ballantyne began developing her craft as an assistant stage manager at the National Theatre Company in Perth. A year later, she relocated to Melbourne, to join the Union Theatre Repertory Company (the formative Melbourne Theatre Company) under director John Sumner. At the age of 22, Ballantyne starred as Lil in the original 1963 sellout production of Alan Hopgood's football play And the Big Men Fly, and the same year, she took two small roles in Patrick White's A Cheery Soul.

Ballantyne had an early television guest role, playing the part of a showgirl, in a 1964 episode of Homicide. In 1967, she appeared in the first of her three major television roles, ABC serial Bellbird, in which she played librarian Laura 'Lori' Chandler (formerly Grey), opposite actor Dennis Miller, whom she married the following year. After her character married Tom Grey (played by Tom Oliver), Ballantyne left the series in 1971, to focus on raising her family.

After her marriage ended, Ballantyne resumed her acting career, appearing in Marion in 1974. She became a staple of the early Crawford Production serials in the 1970s, including Division 4, Matlock Police and further guest roles in Homicide. Simultaneously, she continued to act on stage, beginning with a role in a 1973 production of Harold Pinter's Old Times, followed by Much Ado About Nothing, Kid Stakes and a number of plays at Russell Street Theatre. She also appeared in the 1976 Ozploitation film End Play and 1978 family film Blue Fin.

Ballantyne subsequently moved to commercial TV, playing firm but compassionate prison officer Meg Jackson (later Morris) in the soap opera Prisoner (known internationally as Prisoner: Cell Block H) from 1979. She was the only actor to stay with the series for its entire eight-year run, making her the longest serving cast member. She admitted that she stayed with the show because she enjoyed it and she also had two sons to raise. She later reprised her role of Meg in the original stage tour of Prisoner: Cell Block H – The Stage Play, which toured the UK in 1989.

After Prisoner was cancelled in 1986, Ballantyne filmed a lead role as Maude Bum in Fool's Shoe Hotel for the ABC. She then appeared in an episode of The Flying Doctors, and was cast in children's series The True Story of Spit MacPhee, alongside John Bach, Ray Meagher and Linda Cropper. She also played the role of Aunt Annabelle in children's series Pugwall and guested in an episode of G.P. in 1991.

In 1992, Ballantyne began regularly appearing in the soap opera Neighbours as coffee shop owner Cathy Alessi, wife of Benito Alessi (George Spartels) and mother of Rick and Marco Alessi (played by Dan Falzon and Felice Arena respectively), as part of a new Italian family that was introduced to the series. She left the show the following year. Subsequently, she has appeared in guest roles on TV dramas Blue Heelers, SeaChange, The Secret Life of Us, All Saints, City Homicide, and 2013 miniseries Paper Giants: Magazine Wars.

Ballantyne film roles have included 2000 fantasy Selkie, and 2005 film Three Dollars. She also appeared in 2006 coming-of-age film The Caterpillar Wish as Mrs. Woodbridge, and in 2007 adventure-drama film Moonlight & Magic as thrift shop owner Desma. Further film credits include 2007 drama short film Twenty Five Cents, 2010 Australian neo-western thriller film Red Hill alongside Ryan Kwanten and Steve Bisley and a role as the wheelchair-using matriarch in the 2011 short The Last Tupper. She also played Maxine Daniels in the film Boronia Boys (2011), reprising the role in the series Boronia Backpackers (2022).

== Personal life ==
Ballantyne was married to actor Dennis Miller in 1967. Both had leading roles in the premiere production of And the Big Men Fly in 1963, followed by long-running series Bellbird. The couple had two sons, Matthew and Tobias. They separated in 1969 and divorced in 1977.

Ballantyne's brother, Guy, also became an actor and her sister, Jane, a film producer.

== Filmography ==
=== Film ===
Year	Title	Role	Notes
1966	Melbourne	Narrator	Short film
1975	End Play	Welfare Officer	
1978	Blue Fin	Mrs. Pascoe	
1982	Breakfast in Paris	Millie	
1989	Blowing Hot and Cold	Shelagh MacBean	
1990	A Doctor's Response		Short film
2000	Selkie	Loopy Laura	
2005	Three Dollars	Eddie's Mother	
2006	The Caterpillar Wish	Mrs. Woodbridge	
2007	Moonlight & Magic	Desma	
2007	Twenty Five Cents		Short film
2008	Floating	Elderly Woman	Short film
2010	Red Hill	Old Woman	
2010	The Last Tupper	Rhonda	Short film
2011	Boronia Boys	Maxine	

=== Television ===
Year	Title	Role	Notes
1963	Consider Your Verdict	Cynthia Martin	Episode: "Queen Versus Luxton"
1963	Double Yolk	Jane	TV play
1963	And The Big Men Fly	Lil	TV play
1963	By Accident		TV play
1964–1975	Homicide	Maureen Davis; Cheryl Evans; Joyce; Suzi Knight	4 episodes: "The Silent Witness" "One Itch To Murder" "The Fireworks Man" "Rage"
1965	Photo Finish		TV play
1965	Daphne Laureola		TV play
1966	Plain Jane	Kathleen	TV play
1966	Anonymous		Episode of Australian Playhouse
1967–1971	Bellbird	Laura 'Lori' Chandler / Laura 'Lori' Grey	Series regular
1972–1975	Matlock Police	Shirley Evans; Jenny Fisher; Judy Martin; Jean Thompson	4 episodes: "Chain Reaction" "The Loan Wolf" "Prosperity Breeds Contempt" "First Day Out"
1972–1975	Division 4	Janet Walker; Dr. Jan Moore; Fran Taylor; Iris Ryan; Karen Marsh; Sen. Const. Terri Standish; Policewoman; June Salmon	9 episodes: "For The Love of Money" "Senior Stewart" "Flight Plan" "Traveling Man" "Talk Back" "The Virgil" "Easy Mark" "A Sense of Duty Part 1&2"
1973	Ryan	Rhoda Bitov	Episode: "The Girl with the Golden Slippers"
1974	Marion	Joan Carruthers	Miniseries, 3 episodes
1974	This Love Affair	Laura	Episode 2: "Tilting at Windmills"
1975	Quality of Mercy		Episode 2: "The Love Job"
1976	Tandarra	Molly Martin	Episode: "That's What Worries Me"
1976	Power Without Glory	Dorothy Wells	2 episodes: "Confound Their Politics", "Fallen Heroes"
1976	Solo One	Sylvia Simpson	Episode: "Little Joe"
1977	Bluey	Rhoda Lewis	Episode: "Son of Bluey"
1978	Cop Shop	Claudie Gaynor, Dawn Curran	3 episodes
1979	Ride on Stranger		Miniseries, 1 episode
1979–1986	Prisoner	Meg Jackson / Meg Morris	Series regular Prisoner: Cell Block H (UK), Caged Women (Canada)
1986	Adrian		Film documentary
1987	The Fool's Shoe Hotel	Maude Bum	TV play
1987–1991	The Flying Doctors	Barbara Freeman; Wendy Ross; Alice Franklin	3 episodes: "The Unluckiest Boy in Town" "Cadenza" "None So Blind"
1988	Captain Johnno	Mrs. Greenwood	TV movie
1988	Spit MacPhee	Grace Tree	Miniseries
1989–1991	Pugwall	Aunt Annabelle	10 episodes
1991	G.P.	Jean Watson	Episode: "The Price You Pay"
1992–1993	Neighbours	Cathy Alessi	Series regular
1997	One Way Ticket	Elizabeth	TV movie
1998	State Coroner	Pat Thompson	Episode: "Three's a Crowd"
2000	SeaChange	Coral Kiss	2 episodes: "Love Is in the Time of Coleridge", "To Thine Own Self Be Relatively True"
2002	Blue Heelers	Margaret White	Episode: "Sins of the Father"
2002	Marshall Law	Irene	Episode: "Money Talks"
2003	The Secret Life of Us	Celebrant	Episode: "The Quality of My Life"
2003–2004	Stingers	Chief Comm. Steadman	2 episodes: "Boosted", "Break and Enter"
2004	All Saints	Anne Lytton	2 episodes: "Benefit of the Doubt", "Don't Look Back"
2005	Blue Heelers	Nola Paderson	Episode: "Getting the Bullet"
2005	Last Man Standing	Aunty Marg	1 episode
2008	City Homicide	Miss Evelyn Purcell	Episode: "Thicker Than Water"
2008	Rush	Edie	1 episode
2013	Paper Giants: Magazine Wars	Emily King	1 episode
2022	Boronia Backpackers	Maxine Daniels	4 episodes
2023	Mondo Maniacs	Desma	2 episodes

== Theatre ==
Year	Title	Role	Notes	Ref.
1954	Crime and Punishment		Studio Theatre, Adelaide with Adelaide Theatre Group	
1955	No Sign of the Dove		Studio Theatre, Adelaide with Adelaide Theatre Group	
1956	A Midsummer Night's Dream		University of Adelaide	
1957	Bus Stop		Willard Hall, Adelaide with Independent Repertory Incorporated	
1957	Johnny Belinda		Unley Town Hall, Adelaide with Adelaide Repertory Theatre	
1958	The Sun in Servitude		Willard Hall, Adelaide with Adelaide Theatre Group	
1958	The Crucible	Abigail Williams	Willard Hall, Adelaide with Adelaide Theatre Group	
1959	Our Town	Rebecca Gibbs	UNSW, Sydney with NIDA	
1959	The House of Bernarda Alba	Maria Josepha (Bernarda's Mother)	UNSW, Sydney with NIDA	
1959	Julius Caesar	Citizens, soldiers, messengers, senators etc	Elizabethan Theatre, Sydney with NIDA	
1960	Moon on a Rainbow Shawl		University of Adelaide	
1960	The Green Pastures	Candidate Magician	New Auditorium, Sydney with NIDA	
1960	The Glass Menagerie	Stage Manager	UNSW, Sydney with NIDA	
1960	Hay Fever	Sorel Bliss	UNSW, Sydney with NIDA	
1961	Eighty in the Shade	Goody	Playhouse, Perth with National Theatre	
1961	Crime Passionel	Assistant Stage Manager	Playhouse, Perth with National Theatre	
1961	The Grass is Greener	Assistant Stage Manager	Playhouse, Perth with National Theatre	
1961	Breath of Spring	Assistant Stage Manager	Playhouse, Perth with National Theatre	
1961	The One Day of the Year	Assistant Stage Manager	Playhouse, Perth with National Theatre	
1961	The Admirable Crichton	Tweeny	Playhouse, Perth with National Theatre	
1961–1962	The No Hopers	Alma Hyland	Playhouse, Perth, with National Theatre, University of Melbourne with Union Theatre Rep Co	
1962	Volpone, or The Fox	Celia	Freemasons Hall, Adelaide	
1962	You Never Can Tell	Dolly Clandon	University of Melbourne with Union Theatre Rep Co	
1963	The Good Ship Walter Raleigh	Rita	University of Melbourne with Union Theatre Rep Co	
1963	The Devil's Disciple	Essie	University of Melbourne with Union Theatre Rep Co	
1963	A Cheery Soul	Baby Porteous / The Maid	University of Melbourne with Union Theatre Rep Co	
1963	The Man Who Came to Dinner	June Stanley	Russell Street Theatre, Melbourne	
1963–1964	And the Big Men Fly	Lil	Russell St Theatre, Melbourne, Arts Theatre, Adelaide, VIC country tour	
1964	Critic's Choice	Angela Ballantine	University of Melbourne with Union Theatre Rep Co	
1964	Hamlet	Ophelia	University of Melbourne, Russell St Theatre, Melbourne with Union Theatre Rep Co	
1964	Love Rides the Rails or Will the Mail Train Run Tonight?		Russell St Theatre, Melbourne with Union Theatre Rep Co	
1964	The Golden Legion of Cleaning Women		Russell St Theatre, Melbourne with Union Theatre Rep Co	
1964	Man and Boy		St Martins Theatre, Melbourne	
1966	A Break in the Music	Nancy	Playhouse, Perth, with National Theatre	
1966	The Killing of Sister George		Canberra Theatre, UNSW, Sydney, Playhouse, Perth, Russell St Theatre, Melbourne	
1967	The Platinum Cat		St Martins Theatre, Melbourne	
1967	A Flea in Her Ear	Eugenie	Russell St Theatre, Melbourne, Canberra Theatre with Union Theatre Rep Co	
1967	The Right Honourable Gentleman	Nia	Russell St Theatre, Melbourne, Canberra Theatre with Union Theatre Rep Co	
1968	Everything in the Garden		Russell St Theatre, Melbourne, with Melbourne Theatre Company (MTC)	
1968	Major Barbara		Russell St Theatre, Melbourne, with Melbourne Theatre Company (MTC)	
1969	Hotel in Amsterdam		Russell St Theatre, Melbourne, with Melbourne Theatre Company (MTC)	
1973	Old Times	Kate	Russell St Theatre, Melbourne, with Melbourne Theatre Company (MTC)	
1973	The Time Is Not Yet Ripe		Comedy Theatre, Melbourne with MTC & J. C. Williamson's	
1975	How Does Your Garden Grow?	Woman	St Martins Theatre, Melbourne with MTC	
1975	Much Ado About Nothing		Russell St Theatre, Melbourne, Canberra Theatre with MTC	
1975	The Freeway		Russell St Theatre, Melbourne, with MTC	
1975–1976	Kid Stakes	Olive	Russell St Theatre, Melbourne, Canberra Theatre & VIC country tour with MTC	
1976	What the Butler Saw	Geraldine Barclay	Monash University, Melbourne	
1977	The Merchant of Venice	Nerissa	Melbourne Athenaeum with MTC	
1977	Ring Round the Moon	Capulet	Melbourne Athenaeum with MTC	
1986	Nunsense		Australian Elizabethan Theatre Trust	
1987	Shimada		Russell St Theatre, Melbourne, with MTC	
1990	The Cocktail Hour		Theatre Royal, Hobart	
1990–1991	Hotel Sorrento	Hilary	Malthouse Theatre, Melbourne, Monash University, Melbourne, Wharf Theatre, Sydney with Playbox Theatre Company & STC	
1991	On the Whipping Side	Helen Watson	Regional QLD tour, Cremorne Theatre, Brisbane with QTC	
2008	Gala		Southbank Theatre, Melbourne with MTC	
2009	Dancing in the Park		Fortyfivedownstairs, Melbourne	
2011	Be Watched by Gary Files – preliminary readings 1	Carmen	Majestic Cinemas, Sydney	
