= Cathy Alessi =

- Neighbours character
- Portrayed by: Elspeth Ballantyne
- Duration: 1992–1993
- First appearance: 28 July 1992
- Last appearance: 4 August 1993
- Introduced by: Don Battye
In-universe information
- Occupation: Coffee Shop owner and manager (1992–1994)
- Husband: Benito Alessi
- Sons: Marco Alessi; Rick Alessi
- Daughters: Lindsay Steiner

Cathy Alessi is a fictional character from the Australian soap opera Neighbours, played by Elspeth Ballantyne. She made her first screen appearance during the episode broadcast on 28 July 1992 and remained until her departure on 4 August 1993.

== Casting ==
The arrival of the new Alessi family was confirmed in the 11 July 1992 issue of TV Week. Di Stanley reported that Elspeth Ballantyne and George Spartels were "in charge of the clan" as parents Cathy and Benito Alessi, whose teenage sons Marco Alessi (Felice Arena) and Rick Alessi (Dan Falzon) had previously been introduced. The family's introduction occurred after the announced departures of several regular characters. The Alessis were the first "truly ethnic" family to be introduced into the cast. Following her role as Meg Morris in Prisoner, Ballantyne took eight years off television to concentrate on theatre work, so when she received the offer to play Cathy, she felt that she could not turn it down. Ballantyne told David Nicholls of Inside Soap: "I had a wry smile on my face when I read about the character of Cathy Alessi. She has two teenage sons, one just out of school and one still in school, and that's a very similar situation to my own." Ballantyne's character became popular with viewers in Australia and the actress said Cathy had some good storylines coming up, so she hoped she would become as popular as Meg. Within a year, the entire Alessi family had left, leaving only Rick behind.

== Development ==
When Cathy became broody around Phoebe Bright (Simone Robertson) and decided to try for another baby, it emerged that she had once had a child adopted out. Cathy conceived while she was dating her future husband Benito (George Spartels). She gave birth to a daughter shortly after her 16th birthday. The news shocked Cathy's son Marco (Felice Arena), who had always thought he was the oldest. He was also hurt because he considered his mother to be his best friend. Marco decided to embark on a search for his sister and the adoption agency tracked her down, but she did not want to make contact with the family. Cathy and Benito believed that the matter was at an end, but a young woman began following Marco and later revealed herself to be his sister, Lindsay (Jane Longhurst). While Marco was pleased to meet Lindsay, she was angry and accused him of ruining her life. Cathy and Benito later came face-to-face with Lindsay. Arena enjoyed filming the storyline and praised Ballantyne and Spartels.

== Storylines ==
Cathy and her husband, Benito, move into Number 22 Ramsay Street, after they are left it by Benito's niece, Christina (Gayle Blakeney), and her husband. Cathy takes over the Coffee Shop lease from Madge Bishop (Anne Charleston) and employs a pregnant Phoebe Bright to help out. Phoebe's pregnancy causes Cathy to reminisce about the daughter she gave up for adoption. She tells Benito that she wants to try for a baby. Benito is initially against the idea as he had a vasectomy after their youngest son, Rick, was born. However, he decides to get it reversed. Cathy is devastated to learn from the doctors that she is not able to carry a child to full term due to her age. Phoebe asks Cathy to be godmother to her daughter, Hope.

Cathy's spaghetti sauce recipe catches the eye of a sauce manufacturer and they ask Cathy to sell the ingredients to them. She initially refuses to consider the offer as the recipe had been passed down from Mama Alessi in Italy. The manufacturer also wants to add extra flavourings, which Cathy believes would ruin the taste, but she agrees to the deal as the money is too good to turn down. Cathy's son's Marco and Rick are told about their sister and Marco finds her. Lindsay agrees to meet Cathy and Benito, but only if Marco does not tell them she is their daughter. He brings her to the house and Cathy and Benito believe she is Marco's girlfriend. They are shocked when Marco reveals that Lindsay is their daughter. Cathy meets Lindsey, but she becomes upset when Lindsay tells her that she wants to get on with her life. Cathy gives her some knitted booties that she had kept and Lindsay agrees to keep in touch.

Benito is offered a job in Sydney and Cathy leaves the Coffee Shop in the hands of Phoebe and her husband, Stephen (Lochie Daddo). Cathy is not happy that Rick wants to stay behind, but she gives him her blessing. When Phoebe and Stephen leave town, Rick takes over the Coffee Shop until Cathy comes back to terminate the lease. Cathy tries to persuade Rick to come to Sydney with her, but she eventually arranges for Lou Carpenter (Tom Oliver) to take Rick in.

== Reception ==
A writer for the BBC's Neighbours website said that Cathy's most notable moment was "Meeting her adopted daughter." Inside Soap's Josephine Monroe branded Cathy "supermum". Robin Oliver of The Sydney Morning Herald used Cathy coming to terms with her infertility as an example of Neighbours becoming more "moralistic". Pauline Cronin of the Sunday World was not a fan of the character, calling her a "dreadful woman". Cronin bemoaned Cathy's desire for another child and thought her reaction to Benito's revelation about his vasectomy was unrealistic, writing "Come on Neighbours. Please, let's get real. Just a little bit. Benito told Cathy about his little problem in the morning and by mid-afternoon she was all smiles again telling him he could have the operation reversed. Reversed? Any real, hot-blooded woman would have the little bastard snipped again... and again... and again!"
