= Specky Magee =

Series of books by Felice Arena and Garry Lyon

Specky Magee is an Australian children’s book series written by Felice Arena and renowned Aussie rules football player Garry Lyon, that chronicles the life and times of teenager Simon Magee, an aspiring Australian rules football champion.

== List of books in the series ==
- Specky Magee (2002), ISBN 0-207-19829-2 is the first in the series. It follows Specky through his love for Aussie Rules. In this book, Specky becomes curious about an old photo of him being dressed in AFL gear, even though his family hates AFL. Upon discovering an online friend, "CHRISkicks", who turns out to be a girl, he wonders whether he is adopted.
- Specky Magee & the Great Footy Contest (2003), ISBN 0-14-330061-X is the second book. In this instalment, Specky and his friends are confronted by an old enemy of Specky, "Screamer" Johnson, who threatens his role as full-forward, while undertaking vigorous tests in the Great Footy Contest, a competition for young football stars to demonstrate amazing skills in order to win a trip to either the US or Ireland as a youth AFL ambassador.
- Specky Magee & the Season of Champions (2004), ISBN 0-14-330062-8 is the third book. In this instalment, Specky encounters many new friends, and his football career is threatened by a serious knee injury, which sidelines him for seven weeks. He disregards this, plays anyway, and jeopardises his health.
- Specky Magee & the Boots of Glory (2005), ISBN 0-14-330188-8 is the fourth book. In this instalment, upon winning an AFL scholarship, Specky is now a student at the prestigious Gosmore Grammar, a great footy school. Specky proves to be a gun, even at that level, until his future there is jeopardised by an initiation stunt.
- Specky Magee & a Legend in the Making (2006), ISBN 0-14-330189-6 is book number five. In this instalment, Specky discovers a softer side to Screamer; he enjoys playing piano, and is very talented. His relationship with Christina is threatened by this, but Specky helps him follow his dream, with mixed results. He also obtains a selection in the Victorian U-15 side.
- Specky Magee & the Spirit of the Game (2007), ISBN 978-0-14-330301-5 is book six. In this instalment, upon winning selection for the Vics, Specky meets Brian Edwards, a gun midfielder, who lives in the country. Specky visits the country, and plays for the seniors side in the town, while Danny, Gobba and Robbo battle for the affections for a French exchange student.
- Specky Magee & the Battle of the Young Guns (2009) is book seven. In this instalment, Specky's career at the Booyong footy team is threatened by failed maths tests and a tough new teacher and coach. He also plays in the National Footy Carnival, and is offered sports management, and a gob-smacking surprise offer that presumably will be the thread in to book eight.
- Specky Magee & the Best of Oz (2011) is book eight. Specky faces new challenges: a new team, a new country and new code of football. A fast-paced story that sees Specky and his Aussie teammates have an adventure of a lifetime in Ireland.

== Characters ==
The books follow young football star Simon "Specky" Magee through his teenage years. He is obsessed with AFL, as are most of his mates.

Simon "Specky" Magee is the titular character of the novels. He attends local high school Booyong High throughout books 1–3 and 5–7, pausing for a short stint at Gosmore Grammar in book 4. He is portrayed as a twelve-year-old in book 1, a thirteen-year-old in book 2 and in book 3, and a fourteen-year-old Year 9 student in the remaining books. He is incredibly skilled at Aussie Rules footy, mainly as a full-forward, but also occasionally as a wingman, centre half-forward or even centre half-back. He supports five AFL teams, something he cops a lot of flak for: Essendon, Brisbane, Collingwood, Sydney and West Coast. He is the main character, and he was adopted when his biological mother died in a car accident and his biological father couldn't care for him due to it being too difficult. His father barracks for Geelong, and his adopted parents (and sister) hate football.

Josh "Robbo" Roberts is one of Specky's best mates. He plays as a ruckman in the Booyong High school team, and is nearly six feet tall. He supports Sydney 100%, having been born there. In book six he begins to date one of Specky's friends, Samantha Shepherd.

Danny Castellino is another of Specky's best mates. He is the number-one rover in the Booyong side, and he is portrayed as a very small character. He is extremely fit, and he is a one-eyed supporter of Collingwood. Like Robbo, in book 6 he begins a romance—with national sprint champion Maria "Gladiator" Testi—and ends it in book 7; however, unlike Robbo, he starts it up again.

Christina Perry is Specky's on-again, off-again girlfriend. The two meet in book 1, and begin a romance at the end of book 3 after her relationship with Derek "Screamer" Johnson ends. Christina follows Carlton like Screamer. She is portrayed as a footy-mad tomboy just like Samantha Shepherd. She moved to Sydney in book 6, but returned at the start of book 7.

Samantha "Tiger Girl" Shepherd is another of Specky's close friends. She meets Specky in book 3 while she is in Year 9 and he is in Year 8. Specky supports her through her battle with cancer, and become close friends by the end of the book. She also reveals that she is staying down a year to make up for her long absences from school due to her treatment, so is now in Year 9 like Specky and his mates. They have always felt romantically close to each other, but this intensified in book 7, when Robbo and Tiger Girl's relationship ended. They are now a couple, something Christina is not aware of. She supports the Tigers, hence her nickname.

Derek "Screamer" Johnson is Specky's long-time enemy, and now one-time friend. He enters the series in book 2, sparking jealousy from Specky due to his immediate connection with Christina and his skill at full-forward. In book 5, Specky learns of Screamer's extraordinary piano talent, and encourages him to follow his dreams, which turns them into friends at the end of the book. In book 7, it is revealed that he is leaving Booyong High to attend Eckert School of Music on a piano scholarship in Sydney.

Ben "Gobba" Higgins is another of Specky's schoolmates. He is first mentioned in book 3—when he returns from Canada, apparently having been there a year—but had not been mentioned before that. His nickname comes from his dream and talent of being a pro sports commentator, and he is so good that he is enrolled in the Dennis Cometti School of Young Sports Callers. He gets frequent assignments from this school, but he still attends Booyong full-time. He supports the Bulldogs.

Johnny Cockatoo is one of Specky's close friends. The two meet on Specky's trip to the Northern Territory in book 2, and immediately bond. When Johnny moves down to Melbourne, the two's friendship becomes stronger. He plays rover, like Danny, and the two are shown to work very well together. He is very proud of his Aboriginal heritage, and knows everything about indigenous AFL players. He barracks for the Kangaroos.

Brian Edwards is another of Specky's friends. He first appears in book 5, when the two meet through State footy training. To meet his commitments to the State team in Melbourne, Brian temporarily moves from Rivergum (near Mildura) to Specky's place before leaving. He is mentioned briefly in book 7, but he makes no other appearance in book 7, hinting that he has left Booyong and Specky's house, but is still in Melbourne to play for the Vics. He is the third character in the books to be a known supporter of Carlton (the others being Christina and Screamer).

Maria "Gladiator" Testi is Danny's love interest. A national sprint champion, she expresses interest in Danny during book six, especially at Alice's sweet sixteen party. In book 7, her role deepens, appearing in Specky, Danny, Robbo, Sols, the Bullet, Gobba and Tiger Girl's maths class, but Danny breaks it off with her during this novel because she became too clingy, only to reunite again.

Sanjay Sharma, known as "the Bullet," is a friend of Specky. He is of Indian descent. He is a sprinter capable of dashes and snaps.

Paul "Smashing Sols" Solomon is another of Specky's friends, and like the Bullet, not an extremely close one. Their relationship grows slightly in book 7, united in their hatred of their new maths teacher. His nickname comes from his brilliant tackling ability.

Coach Sandy Pate is Specky's AFL coach from book 2 to the start of book 7. She is a fair coach, coming to Booyong at the beginning of book 2 to replace Coach Pappas. She likes Specky, and often gives him advice. She leaves in book 7 to go to Italy with her fiancée, leaving the AFL coaching duties to Mr Rutherford, who is also Specky's maths teacher.

Mr Rutherford appears in book 7, though it is assumed that his part in the books will expand if the series goes on. He appears as Specky's new maths teacher, and is known as a strict, tough, unfair teacher by Specky and his mates. Things get worse when he becomes coach, but Specky gets to like him when Mr Rutherford apologises for dismissing Specky from the footy team when he fails a math test that turns out not to be his.

Alice Magee is Specky's sixteen-year-old sister. She is shown on various occasions to dislike Specky, but it is known that she cares for him. She is dating The Great McCarthy, a Year 12 friend of Specky's, though their relationship has become strained through Great McCarthy's VCE studies. Has a hatred of AFL, though when Shane Crawford kissed her, she converted into a Hawks supporter, but her support for Shane and the club deteriorated quickly.

David & Jane Magee are Specky's adoptive parents. They are often tough but fair on Specky, especially when it comes to his footy commitments. It has been said that David is lousy at all sports, and so doesn't support Specky, but this changes from book 2 onwards. Jane is also a good cook, as mentioned in book 7. They took in David's brother Bob's young child (Specky) at eighteen months.

Gus "Einstein" Turner is probably the most distant of Specky's school acquaintances. He is known in the first two books as a half-forward, but in book 7 he becomes known as a full-back. A maths whiz, Einstein is known to surmise distances, of AFL kicks especially. He floats out of the series after the first two books, and does not make an appearance after that, apart from a brief mention in book 7. According to the Specky Magee website, he barracks for Geelong.

Jack Magee is Specky's baby brother. He first appears in book 6, as he is born, but is currently unable to speak or walk. He mainly gurgles throughout book 7, especially when he is having a good time.

Ken Magee is Specky's grandfather, and the reason Specky supports the West Coast Eagles. He enters the Magee house in book 7, causing a lot of tension. He has a tumour, and is expected to live only another eight months longer.

Dieter "The Great McCarthy" McCarthy is a Year 12 student, studying economics. He is Alice's boyfriend, and Specky's acquaintance. He is shown to smoke, though is trying to give it up, and was once the Richmond mascot, who he supports.

Kyle Rutherford appears, like his father, solely in book 7, but will presumably return for the rest of the series. He and his dad move to Booyong in this novel, something that he resents, having been a big fish in a small pond there, and is jealous of Specky, possibly because of his status, or his skills, and deliberately sets Specky up to fail his maths test to get him kicked off the team. Worm Alistair Singleton is in mainly in the fourth book but briefly mentioned in book 5. Nicknamed Worm due to his love of books. Worms other hobbies include umpiring local gosmore games including a quarter of the boots of glory game.
