= Doug Willis =

Fictional character from the Australian soap opera Neighbours

- Neighbours character
- Portrayed by: Terence Donovan
- Duration: 1990–1994, 2005, 2014–2016, 2022
- First appearance: 18 July 1990
- Last appearance: 28 July 2022
- Introduced by: Don Battye (1990); Ric Pellizerri (2005); Jason Herbison (2014, 2022)
- Spin-off appearances: Hey Piper (2015)
In-universe information
- Occupation: Builder; Motel investor
- Family: Willis
- Father: Bert Willis
- Sisters: Faye Hudson
- Wife: Pam Willis (1967–2016)
- Sons: Adam Willis; John Willis; Brad Willis
- Daughters: Gaby Willis; Cody Willis
- Grandsons: Zac Willis; Ned Willis; Josh Willis
- Granddaughters: Paige Smith; Imogen Willis; Piper Willis; Roxy Willis
- Grandfathers: Zachary
- Nephews: Cameron Hudson
- Other relatives: Matilda Turner; Gabriel Smith

Douglas "Doug" Willis is a fictional character from the Australian soap opera Neighbours, played by Terence Donovan. Doug was introduced by executive producer Don Battye as the patriarch of the newly introduced Willis family. Donovan explained that being part of "a loving family" was one of the main reasons he accepted the role. He said he was happy to stay around for as long as the producers wanted him. Donovan made his first screen appearance as Doug during the episode broadcast on 18 July 1990.

Doug is portrayed as a man's man, down-to-earth, easy-going and friendly. Doug is a builder, who loves his family and enjoys spending time with his friends. Despite being "an easy touch" as a father, Doug manages to balance understanding with discipline. Doug and his wife, Pam (Sue Jones) have a solid marriage until they began to neglect each other due to work. When Doug thinks Pam is having an affair with their neighbour, Jim Robinson (Alan Dale), Doug ends up having a one-night stand with Jill Weir (Lyn Semler). Doug's father, Bert (Bud Tingwell), is introduced in 1993. They had had a difficult relationship but they make amends when Doug learns his father is dying. Shortly after, Doug got into debt and lost his job, causing him to sink into a deep depression.

One of Doug's last storylines saw him have a health scare in which he undergoes an emergency operation. The character departed on 15 September 1994, after being written out. In July 2005, Donovan reprised his role as part of the show's 20th anniversary celebrations. He reprised the role again in April 2014 and Doug came to Ramsay Street to visit his family. He is also diagnosed with Alzheimer's disease. Doug continued to make guest appearances until his death in April 2016, with his storylines mostly focusing on the progression of his Alzheimer's and how it affects him and his family. Doug later appears as a vision in 2022 as part of the Neighbours finale.

== Casting ==
The Willis family were created following a period of poor ratings in Sydney, a cast "shuffle", and a newly hired producer Margaret Slarke. Terrence Donovan was cast as the family patriarch, Doug Willis. He had just completed a short stint in fellow Australian soap opera Home and Away, and he began filming in June 1990. The family aspect was one of the main reasons Donovan accepted the part. He told Chris Pritchard from Woman's Own, "I'm very pro that sort of thing. Having been part of two families that broke up in real life, it's nice to be in a loving family – even if it's only make-believe." Donovan added that he was enjoying his time with the show and was happy to stay for as long as the producers wanted him. He made his first screen appearance on 18 July 1990. The actor's son, Jason Donovan, previously appeared in the show as Scott Robinson from 1985 to 1989. Donovan later admitted that producers asked him to join the show when his son was cast, but he did not want to. Once Jason left, Donovan said "I thought now I can be my own person, so we went in there and created a family situation and it was really good. But that was 20 years ago. God!"

== Development ==
=== Characterisation ===
"Doug could easily be described as a man's man; he was never afraid to use his fists and one of his greatest pleasures was making home-brewed beer with his best mate, Lou."

— A writer from the show's website describes Doug.

Upon his introduction, Doug was a self-employed builder and "affable fortysomething". He made extra money by buying and doing up houses, before selling them on. Despite this hobby being "unsettling" for his family in the past, they decided that the house he purchased in Ramsay Street should be their permanent residence. Doug loved his family and enjoyed spending time drinking with his friends. In his book, The Who's Who of Soap Operas, Anthony Haywood described Doug as being a "rugged and down-to-earth builder", who is usually easy-going but does have "an awful temper" when provoked. A writer for the official Neighbours website called Doug a Regular Joe, who did not like standing out in a crowd.

Haywood wrote that Doug's warmth and sense of humour made him popular with his co-workers and friends. Doug also had a habit of flirting with attractive women but it was perfectly innocent. Doug was "an easy touch" as a father but he could balance understanding with discipline. Doug often doubted his eldest son Adam's (Ian Williams) determination but he got on well with Brad (Scott Michaelson). Doug hoped to pass his business onto one of his sons but was disappointed at the lack of enthusiasm from them both. He was "baffled" by Gaby's (Rachel Blakely) rebellious nature, while Cody (Amelia Frid), his youngest child, was the apple of his eye and often came to him with her problems instead of her mother.

=== Marriage and affair ===
In his fictional backstory, Doug accepted a dare to travel naked across town in a taxi driven by Pam Beresford (Sue Jones). The couple soon married and had four children; Adam, Gaby, Brad and Cody. When Pam wanted to return to work, Doug was "appalled" as he liked the idea of providing for her and wondered who would provide him with his meals. Pam and Doug's seemingly solid marriage runs into trouble when they begin neglecting one another due to work. Doug devotes his time to his construction business, while Pam's job as a district nurse gives her increasing independence. Jones said she was not surprised that Pam and Doug were having problems. When Pam begins nursing Jim Robinson (Alan Dale) through his heart problems, she develops an attraction to him and is on the verge of having an affair. Meanwhile, Doug attracts the unwelcome attentions of the lonely and "dogged" Jill Weir (Lyn Semler), who is dealing with the death of her son, Ross (Che Broadbent). With Doug suspecting that something is "brewing" between his wife and Jim, the resentment leads him to Jill. His feelings of "vulnerability" make him an easy target for her, as she sees him as the perfect partner and is determined to get him.

Speaking to a TVTimes writer, Jones stated "Doug's vulnerable to someone coming along and telling him how wonderful he is. He is still a bit of a male chauvinist who hasn't totally accepted Pam's return to work. And the suspicion that Pam and Jim are having a fling only makes him more insecure." She added that Doug had always been flirtatious and it would only take a little push for him to succumb to Jill's charms. When Pam refuses to accompany Doug on a work trip, he mistakenly believes that she wants to spend more time with Jim, with whom he now suspects she is having "a torrid affair". Doug goes on the trip alone and ends up meeting Jill at his hotel. He does not reject her romantic advances and they have a one-night stand. An Inside Soap writer observed that while Doug sees thinks it is "a harmless fling", Jill is looking for more from him.

The TVTimes writer likened the storyline to the 1987 film Fatal Attraction. Doug regrets his affair with Jill immediately, but she is keen for it to happen again. Jill tells various residents that she is moving in with Doug, leading him to tell Pam what happened in an "emotional confession". Pam reacts with anger, especially when Doug admits he only had sex with Jill because of her connection with Jim. The plot is also shown to have an effect on the couple's children and Gaby is left distraught by the situation. Meanwhile, Jill's behaviour prompted the Inside Soap writer to comment "You don't have to be Einstein to work out that Jill – to be polite – is a bit psycho, and will do absolutely anything to hold onto Doug."

Wanting to move back home and reconcile with his wife, Doug tells Jill that he wants nothing to do with her and their affair is definitely over. Another Inside Soap columnist questioned whether the Willis marriage would survive and Jones told them: "I think it's worth saving. If Doug and Pam have any sense, they'll sort things out. Who knows? They might even end up with a stronger relationship than they had before." The following year, while Pam is going through menopause, she begins to feel that Doug is paying more attention to the cement mixer then he is to her. Writers introduced Tom Weaver (George Mallaby), who meets Pam at an art class. Tom makes his romantic interest in Pam clear and asks her to marry him in front of Doug. Refusing to believe that nothing has happened between Tom and his wife, a "horrified" Doug packs his bag and moves out. After Tom speaks with Doug, he moves back in.

=== Reuniting with Bert ===
Doug had a difficult relationship with his father Bert (Bud Tingwell), which made him determined to always be around for his children. When Gaby revealed that she had been writing to her grandfather for years, behind Doug's back, it almost caused a division within the family. Doug had not seen his father since he had walked out on the family when Doug was young. When Pam and Gaby announced that they had invited Bert to stay, Doug forbid them from letting him in the house. At first he refused to tell them why and Pam and Gaby believed that they could re-build the relationship between father and son. An Inside Soap writer commented "But they've got to work fast because times's not on their side." There was "instant friction" between Bert and Doug when they finally met. When Bert tried to explain his actions, Doug refused to forgive him for walking out on his mother. Bert later confided in Wayne Duncan (Jonathon Sammy-Lee) that he was dying and had come to Erinsborough to make amends. Realising that Doug was not going to give Bert a chance, Wayne told him about Bert's condition. However, Bert did not want Doug's pity and made plans to leave on the next boat but Pam persuaded him to return, where he and Doug made up.

=== Depression and health scare ===
After getting into debt and losing his job, Doug sank into a deep depression. The storyline began during a few months that were "fraught with anxiety" for both Doug and Pam. Shortly after Brad was left at the altar by his fiancée Beth Brennan (Natalie Imbruglia). Doug bore some abuse when it was discovered that he had known about Brad's affair with Lauren Carpenter (Sarah Vandenbergh). Doug's business seemed to be doing well but nobody was aware of "the lack of care" Doug had been playing to the books. When he and Pam learned that they owed $70,000 in unpaid taxes and fines, the business "came crashing down." This resulted in Doug having no option but to sell the business to rival company Constructocon, who bought it and Doug's reputation for a fraction of their real value.

Donovan explained "Things look really bleak for the Willis family right now. Doug can't see any way out of this mess and he's not facing up to things at all." On the orders of his new boss, Mr Baker (Fred Barker), Doug had to take on his nephew – Terry (Adam McInnes) – a lazy "good-for-nothing", who had no interest in the business. Doug ended up firing Terry in a fit of anger but Baker forced him to re-hire Terry, after threatening him with the sack. The situation was made worse when Doug was finally fired and Donovan commented that it was a nightmare time for Doug, adding "He loved his business and now things have spiralled out of control." While Pam tried her best to comfort Doug, she grew concerned when he started to drown his sorrows with alcohol.

During June 1994, Doug found himself going to the toilet more often than normal, leading him to become worried about his health. Thinking something could be seriously wrong, he realised that he needed medical help but then refused to let the doctor examine him because she was female. It was down to Pam to convince him to let go of his "masculine pride" and allow the doctor to take a look. Doug learned that the problem was due to his prostate and was told that he needed to undergo an emergency operation. He initially refused and Pam had to convince him to change his mind in time to prevent the problem getting any worse.

=== Departure and cameo appearance ===
By mid-September 1994, Doug, Pam and Cody were the only members of the Willis family left in the show. Doug and Pam were written out and replaced by the new five-strong Kennedy family. Donovan quit Neighbours to return to the stage, after securing a role in a musical production of Peter Pan in Britain. He stated "I was going to be in England, anyway, this Christmas, to prepare for the musical tour and meet up with Jason. I jumped at the chance to be in panto, which has such a rich tradition. I started in musicals back in the 1960s. Jason saw me in Chicago 25 times, so it must have rubbed off." On-screen, the couple left Erinsborough for Darwin when Doug was offered some building work with the hotel run by Gaby. On 14 April 2005, Kris Green from Digital Spy confirmed that Donovan would be reprising his role for a guest appearance during the serial's 20th anniversary celebrations, which were broadcast in July.

=== Return and Alzheimer's diagnosis ===
In February 2014, Neighbours producers stated that two cast members featured in a photo taken in 1992 would be returning to the show. On 14 March, it was confirmed that Donovan would once again be reprising the role of Doug for a guest stint. His return aired from 9 April 2014. Donovan commented, "It is very exciting to be coming back as the same character after all these years and I always loved the Doug Willis character. And I love the fact that he is a builder and he is encouraging his young grandson [Josh] to have a trade and be proud of what you do – I think that's very important." Doug returned to Ramsay Street to visit Brad (now played by Kip Gamblin) and his family. During his stay with Brad, Doug got the chance to teach his grandson Josh (Harley Bonner) some practical skills and "the ropes of the building trade".

While Doug and Josh are working together, Lou Carpenter (Tom Oliver) passes on a building job to them but Doug makes "a potentially expensive mistake" when he does not remember it. Josh notices further issues with Doug's memory and becomes worried about his grandfather, but Brad assures him that nothing is wrong and Doug was just being a bit forgetful. Doug is later diagnosed with Alzheimer's disease and Brad has to call Pam to join them in Erinsborough. However, when Pam arrives she refuses to believe the diagnosis, instead she is convinced that Doug has been having an affair because of his secretive behaviour. Donovan said that Doug had been like that as he was afraid to admit what was happening to him. Doug and Pam reunite and are forced to confront his condition. Donovan praised the plot, saying it was "a great opportunity to bring to the fore some issues that affect older people." He later stated "I really do think Jason (Herbison), the producer, the company itself, has taken an enormous step in introducing a character who has the early signs of Alzheimer's or dementia. I think that's very commendable." The actor was asked to be an ambassador for Alzheimer's Australia as a result of the storyline, which he accepted as he had first hand experience with the condition and wanted to help.

Doug returns to visit his family again in November 2014. The following year, Doug returns to meet his great-granddaughter Matilda Turner (Eloise Simbert), following the realisation that his health is declining. Producers used Doug's return to show "the growing epidemic of Alzheimer's disease". Donovan was pleased to reprise his role for the storyline, saying "I think Neighbours is a wonderful forum to raise the subject to young people so that they are aware of what older people are coping with. Nearly all families are going to be impacted by it in the future." Doug returned on 8 February 2016, after Pam realises that she can no longer cope with looking after him. Doug moves in with Brad and partner Lauren Turner (Kate Kendall), marking the first time he had lived on Ramsay Street in 21 years. Due to his condition, Doug quickly loses his temper with Lauren and seeks out Brad's wife Terese Willis (Rebekah Elmaloglou).

In February 2016, Donovan's son Jason confirmed that his father had wrapped up his stint on the show. In his exit storyline, Doug collapses shortly after witnessing Brad reunite with his estranged son Ned Willis (Ben Hall). Despite Karl Kennedy's (Alan Fletcher) efforts to revive him, Doug dies outside Lassiters Hotel. He then appears as a ghost "in a heartwarming moment" as he smiles at Brad and Ned, before walking away. After Doug's last scenes were aired, Donovan admitted that he was sad and unimpressed at how his character was written out of the show. He commented, "Look, it's not the way I'd have liked to do it from the point of view of coming out of the series. But, the producers did it a different way and it's their story and their show." He went on to praise Doug's Alzheimer's storyline, saying it was important that the show focused on social issues as well as love stories.

Donovan reprised the role for the finale episode of Neighbours in July 2022, appearing as a ghost watching Terese and Paul at a street party.

== Storylines ==
After his father walked out, Doug was left to support his mother and sister, Faye (Lorraine Bayly). During a friend's bucks night, Doug accepted a dare to travel across town in a taxi naked. The taxi driver turned out to be Pam Beresford, who Doug fell in love with. He and Pam married and had five children, four of whom survived. When Doug does some work on Number 28 Ramsay Street in preparation for a sale, he decides to purchase the house and the family move to Erinsborough. Doug becomes good friends with Joe Mangel (Mark Little), Lou Carpenter and Jim Robinson, even though they get off to a bad start when Doug flirts with Jim's wife. When Doug's eldest son, Adam, quits medicine, Doug believes he can pass his construction business onto him. However, when he realises that Adam is not really into it, Doug makes his time on the site difficult, forcing Adam to go back to his studies. Doug goes into partnership with Paul Robinson (Stefan Dennis) and they plan to build a retirement village in the bush. Councillor Felicity Brent (Rhona McLeod) threatens to vote against the development but fails and work begins. The project eventually collapses, leaving Doug and Paul in debt.

Doug and Pam's financial troubles continue due to Cody's student exchange fees and them having to bail Brad out of jail. Just as they being thinking about selling the house, Gaby tricks one of Doug's debtors into paying up. Doug befriends Brenda Riley (Genevieve Lemon) and she falls in love with him. Brenda kisses Doug, which Gaby witnesses and she tells Pam. Doug explains that he is not having an affair and then tells Brenda that he never felt anything other than friendship towards her. Doug's sister, Faye, comes to stay and Doug puts up with her because she is lonely. When Faye invites Doug's childhood sweetheart, Alexandra Lomax (Chantal Contouri), for a visit, Doug asks her to leave. Faye moves into Number 32 instead. Doug's photo appears in the local newspaper and it is spotted by Jill Weir. She befriends Doug and Pam, who support her in her custody battle for her son, Ross. When Ross dies, she relies on Doug and Pam. Doug realises that Jill is attracted to him but Pam fails to notice. When Doug assumes Pam and Jim are having an affair, he has a one-night stand with Jill. Doug immediately regrets it and tells Pam, who throws him out and files for divorce. However, when Doug and Brad are lost at sea, Pam realises how much she loves him and they reconcile.

When Gaby is almost raped by Simon Hunter (Frederick Whitlock), Doug tracks him down and hits him. Simon threatens to sue Doug for assault if Gaby reports him to the police, so she is forced to drop the matter. Doug's father, Bert, turns up after Gaby reveals that she has been writing to him. Bert tries to make amends with his son but Doug refuses to forgive him. When Doug learns Bert is dying, he decides to make peace with him. Doug is given the contract to rebuild the Waterhole but before work can begin his company is audited and discovered to be in debt to the tax department, leaving Doug no choice but to sell it to Constructocon. The company keep Doug on but he is eventually fired. Doug sinks into a deep depression and begins drinking. Things begin to improve when Doug finds a job as a sales representative for a building supplier. Doug and Pam learn that they actually paid the money they were supposed to have owed to the tax department and receive a refund. Doug uses the money to buy a house to do up and he sells it to the council, who ask him to do further renovations to the property. Doug finds himself in trouble with Andrew "Macca" MacKenzie (John Morris) when he and Lou begin brewing their own beer in the shed at the property but Macca eventually joins them.

Gaby gives birth to a son, Zac (Jay Callahan), who is named after Doug's grandfather and she leaves to run a hotel in Darwin. A few weeks later, she contacts Doug and offers him some building work on the hotel. Doug and Pam decide to sell up and they leave Erinsborough. Cody stays behind to continue her studies. A year later, Cody is shot and Pam returns to be with her, while Doug stays behind as he is the middle of a big building contract. When Cody comes round, Doug speaks with her on the phone. However, Cody takes a turn for the worse and dies. Pam takes her body back to Darwin where she and Doug bury her. In July 2005, Annalise Hartman (Kimberley Davies) invites Doug to attend a screening of her documentary about Ramsay Street. Doug returns with Philip Martin (Ian Rawlings) and they sneak into Number 22 and paint a beard onto a sleeping Lou's face. After watching the documentary, Lou joins Doug and Philip on a fishing trip up north.

In April 2014, Doug comes to visit Brad and his family on Ramsay Street. Doug also wants to teach his grandson, Josh, the basics of the building trade. Doug catches up with Lou and they decide to start making some of their home brew. Sheila Canning (Colette Mann) hires Doug to cover for her grandson at his yard, and he accepts. Brad's wife, Terese (Rebekah Elmaloglou), suspects Doug prefers Beth to her but Doug assures Brad that it is not the case. Terese later notices that Doug appears to be forgetting things but Brad puts it down to old age. Josh also becomes concerned when Doug messes up a couple of jobs, leaves the yard unattended and gives Imogen (Ariel Kaplan) alcoholic ginger beer by mistake. When Doug stays out all night, he is found injured and talking about meeting Cody. Josh accompanies Doug to the hospital and tests show Doug has early onset Alzheimer's disease. Pam comes down to see Doug and does not initially believe the diagnosis of Alzheimer's, thinking that Doug has been having an affair. She is convinced of Doug's illness and vows to stand by her husband. Brad and Terese asks Pam and Doug to move in with them but Pam and Doug reject the offer to go travelling.

Doug returns a few months later to support Josh ahead of his court case for punching Chris Pappas (James Mason). Josh takes Doug to the park to play cricket, so he has positive memories of him in case he is sent to jail. Doug meets his granddaughter Paige (Olympia Valance) for the first time. He mentions that Brad and Lauren might have stayed together if they had known that Paige was alive but realises he has made a mistake and apologises for upsetting Terese. Doug later gifts Paige an ankle bracelet to welcome her to the family. Doug briefly goes missing and is found in Number 28, his old home. He later teaches Josh and Paige some woodwork skills. When Doug learns Imogen is not attending her school formal, he organises a family formal for her instead. He tells her she can call him anytime, before he leaves for Darwin the next day. The following year, Doug returns to meet Josh's newborn daughter Matilda and stay with his family for Christmas. He gives Paige a commitment ring to give to her boyfriend Mark Brennan (Scott McGregor). Doug runs Paul's car off the road, causing him and his passenger Stephanie Scully (Carla Bonner) to crash. Josh realises what Doug did and tries to protect him. Steph agrees not to report Doug to the police if he agrees to stop driving. Doug and Lou team up to get Josh and Amber Turner (Jenna Rosenow) talking about their daughter's future. Doug announces that he is going home and laments that it might be the last time he remembers who everyone is. He pays a visit to Lou, before leaving for Darwin.

After Doug accidentally sets fire to his house, Pam decides she can no longer take care of him. Brad and Lauren offer to let Doug move in with them but Doug disapproves of Brad and Lauren's relationship and is rude to Lauren. He goes to see Terese and she calms him down, before encouraging him to accept Brad and Lauren's relationship, and he apologises to them. Doug's moments of confusion cause multiple difficulties: he believes Lauren is Pam and attempts to kiss her, leaves Susan Kennedy (Jackie Woodburne) in danger during a heatwave, and pushes his granddaughter Piper Willis (Mavournee Hazel) to the ground in frustration. The family consider putting him in a nursing home but decide to hire Nene Williams (Ally Fowler) to care for him. However, she manipulates his condition to gain attention from Karl Kennedy and is fired. Nene apologises to Doug, and he agrees not to make a complaint. Doug and Josh conspire to bring Brad's other son, Ned Willis (Ben Hall), to Erinsborough, and Doug meets him in Lassiter's Hotel shortly before its boiler room explodes, killing Josh. Doug becomes separated from Ned and finds Brad outside, who believes Doug is confused when he refuses medical attention until he finds Ned. Ned eventually appears and reunites with Brad, but Doug then collapses. Karl is unable to revive him and pronounces him dead. Six years later, Susan imagines Doug talking with Harold Bishop (Ian Smith) during a Ramsay Street party.

== Reception ==
A writer for the BBC's official Neighbours website stated that Doug's most notable moment was "Having an affair with Jill Weir." Haywood commented that Doug was "the more likeable part" compared to Donovan's character, Al Simpson, in Home and Away. Monroe branded Doug "warm-hearted and friendly" and thought that he and Paul made "an odd couple in business". Wanda Jamrozick, writing for The Sydney Morning Herald, called Donovan's performance as Doug "a dominating presence". Barbara Toner from the newspaper criticised the actor's delivery of dialogue in scenes, stating that "no-one could make a three-word sentence last longer than Terence Donovan." Bill Ferguson of the East Kilbride News agreed with Toner, stating "Duuuug speaks with looong vowels through tissssue paper, wears a perpetual grin (must have a sore face) and has had a wee bit of playing away from home when he 'phoned from a convention hotel and, because Big Jim answered the 'phone, assumed there was some hanky panky between him and Duuuug's wife..."

During her feature on Neighbours, Anna Pickard from The Guardian tried to choose the characters she would be most starstruck by if she met them. She said "It would have to be the Willis family. All of them. Pam, Doug, Adam, Gaby, Brad and Cody". Will Gore from MyDaily was excited that Doug was returning to Neighbours. He commented "The truck driving, vest wearing Aussie idol will be hitting our screens in April. As we can see from this startling picture, age has not withered him..." An Inside Soap columnist branded Doug a "Ramsay Street legend" and said "We're always pleased to see former neighbour Doug Willis back on Ramsay Street".
