= Gaby Willis =

- Neighbours character
- Portrayed by: Rachel Blakely
- Duration: 1991–1994, 2005
- First appearance: 12 August 1991
- Last appearance: 27 July 2005
- Introduced by: Don Battye (1991); Ric Pellizerri (2005)
In-universe information
- Occupation: Fashion designer; Barmaid; Secretary; Lassiter's Hotel manager
- Family: Willis
- Father: Doug Willis
- Mother: Pam Willis
- Brothers: Adam Willis; John Willis; Brad Willis
- Sisters: Cody Willis
- Sons: Zac Willis
- Grandfathers: Bert Willis; Seamus Beresford
- Grandmothers: Moina Beresford
- Aunts: Faye Hudson
- First cousins: Cameron Hudson

Gaby Willis is a fictional character from the Australian television soap opera Neighbours, played by Rachel Blakely. The show's casting director spotted Blakely on the cover of a magazine and asked her to audition for the role of Gaby. Blakely received the part and she was introduced to the show during a period of roller-coaster ratings. She made her first appearance during the episode broadcast on 12 August 1991. Gaby was introduced as the eldest daughter of Doug (Terence Donovan) and Pam Willis (Sue Jones). She comes to Erinsborough after taking a business course in Japan. Gaby is characterised as beautiful, intelligent and the apple of her father's eye. She also has a temper, leading Blakely to call her fiery.

Gaby opens her own fashion boutique, with the help and support from her boyfriend, and later fiancé, Glen Donnelly (Richard Huggett). Gaby and Glen's engagement ends when he flees Erinsborough following an accident. Gaby's business burns down and she becomes a punk to cope with her losses. She also befriends and briefly dates a punk musician. Gaby takes a job as a barmaid, before becoming a secretary at the Robinson Corporation. Gaby becomes attracted to teacher Wayne Duncan (Jonathon Sammy-Lee), with whom she shares a real chemistry. However, the couple are mismatched and they often fight. Gaby and Wayne realise their relationship is destructive and they end it. Blakely believed the breakup with Wayne was Gaby's fault and called for her character to grow up.

Gaby takes flying lessons and she falls for her instructor, Jack Flynn (Mark Pennell). Gaby becomes pregnant and Jack agrees to stay away from them. Gaby later gives birth to a son, who is named Zac (Jay Callahan). Blakely's decision to quit Neighbours in 1993 led to Gaby taking a less stressful job in Darwin after struggling to balance her career and motherhood. Her departure aired on 2 September 1994. Blakely later reprised the role to appear in the show's 20th anniversary episode, which was broadcast on 27 July 2005.

== Creation and casting ==
The character, along with Brad Willis (Scott Michaelson) and Guy Carpenter (Andrew Williams), was created as part of a large revamp of the show, which had seen a large decline in ratings and eight other characters written out. Coral O'Connor of the Daily Mirror said it was hoped their introductions would attract younger viewers to the serial. Blakely was a successful model when she was spotted by the Neighbours casting director on the front cover of a magazine and invited to audition for the part of Gaby Willis. The casting director thought Blakely would be perfect for the role. Of her casting, Blakely told Mark McGowan from TV Week: "I was ecstatic... I screamed down the end of the phone when my agent rang me. She asked me to do it again. I obliged!" The producers also hoped Blakely's introduction would capture the "Kylie magic". The actress was introduced to the cast as Gaby in August 1991, alongside Michaelson, who played Gaby's brother, Brad. James Cockington of The Sydney Morning Herald commented on their introduction: "Despite some roller-coaster ratings of late, Ten still believes there is life in Ramsay Street and is introducing some new, young residents this week. Rachel Blakely, 23, and Scott Michaelson, 20, conform to the teen hunk/spunk category that has made E Street such a fun place to visit. Gaby and Brad, as they will become better known, appear as a boutique owner and her brother."

== Development ==
When the Willis family were introduced to Neighbours, eldest daughter Gaby was said to be studying at a business school in Japan. She later returned to Australia and came to live with her parents, Doug Willis (Terence Donovan) and Pam Willis (Sue Jones), in Ramsay Street. Gaby was also reunited with her brother, Brad. During her tenure, writers displayed the character as having a bad temper. Blakely told TV Week's McGowan that "Gaby's a fiery little thing. She flies off the handle quite regularly, which I find quite enjoyable." A writer for the BBC described Gaby as being "the apple of her father's eye" and said her beauty was matched by her intelligence. Josephine Monroe, author of Neighbours: The First 10 Years said Gaby's "cascading dark hair" and model looks meant there was never a shortage of men after her. Monroe opined that whatever Gaby set her mind to, happened. She said Gaby had "a knack with a sewing machine", which she put to use by making dresses for her friends and neighbours. Gaby then decided to use her skills to make a profit and she opened her own boutique called Gabrielle's in the Lassiter's complex.

Gaby begins dating Glen Donnelly (Richard Huggett), who becomes a source of support for her during the opening of her store. He encouraged her to capatalise on a client with a famous name and the boutique's takings rose. Following an argument, Gaby runs off with Guy Carpenter (Andrew Williams), but she is not serious about him and she returns to Glen, who proposes to her. Huggett revealed that Glen and Gaby do not end up getting married, saying "I don't want to give the game away, but it's pretty dramatic stuff, and it all ends in tears." While repairing a roof at the Lassiter's Complex, Glen falls and is paralysed from the waist down, Gaby vows to support him. However, she was devastated when he decided to leave Erinsborough. After her engagement to Glen is broken off and her fashion boutique burns down, Gaby turns into "the biggest rebel in Erinsborough." A writer for Inside Soap said turning punk is her way of coping with her losses. Gaby befriends "outrageous punk" musician Zed (Gavan McLaren) as she believes he is the perfect man to party with. Zed also gives Gaby a lot of support when she needs it. Zed tries to turn his friendship with Gaby into something more, but she turns him down in favour of Simon Hunter (Fred Whitlock). When Gaby is almost raped by Simon, while on a date with him, she turns to Zed for his support. Gaby then decides to date Zed as "a blatant act of defiance" against her father. McLaren explained "It never really comes to anything, but Zed doesn't mind, he's happy just to have Gaby as a friend." Gaby and Zed partake in binge nightclubbing sessions which annoys her parents further. Blakely told Mark McGowan from TV Week that "Gaby threatens that if they don't let her lead her own life, she will move out. Much to her shock they say 'see you later'."

"Gaby Willis is Neighbours' independent woman of the Nineties, but when it comes to love she's about as sophisticated as a sheep in a mud bath!"

— Inside Soap on Gaby (1994)

Gaby takes a barmaid position at The Waterhole and she competes with Brad for the manager's job. A writer for Inside Soap said both siblings are convinced they are the right person for the job and try to prove this to Philip Martin (Ian Rawlings). However, when Gaby issues an ultimatum to Philip to choose between her and Brad, Philip fires her. Gaby embarks on a "fevered" job hunt and she accepts a bar job over the phone. When she goes to the new bar to start work, she discovers that she is expected to waitress topless. Gaby turns the job down and finds employment as a secretary at the Robinson Corporation. She is later promoted to manager of Lassiter's. Gaby later sets about furthering her career. During an interview with Inside Soap, Blakely said she did not think Gaby would ever be happy with a guy as she kept picking losers. She said her character is "too headstong and likes too many arguments."

An attraction forms between Gaby and Wayne Duncan (Jonathon Sammy-Lee) and Monroe said there was a real chemistry between them. The author said that while the couple were mismatched from the start, they could not get each other out of their minds and often came together for "sparring sessions". One night, Gaby believes Wayne has been groping her and she tips her drink over him. Blakely said things get worse from there and explained that when she received a script containing a scene in which Gaby slaps Wayne, Blakely taunted Sammy-Lee. She revealed "When it came to do the scene I slapped him so hard I really hurt him! I think I got a little too worked up for it!" Despite the rough start, Gaby and Wayne do get together, but a writer for Inside Soap said Wayne "turns out to be yet another loser on Gaby's list of unsuitable men." Blakely explained that while Gaby cares for Wayne, she decides the relationship is not right. The couple break up when they realise how destructive their relationship is. The actress thought the breakup was Gaby's fault and said there were some aspects of her character she did not respect. Blakely cited Gaby's fiery nature and her tendency to take gossip too seriously as the aspects she did not like, while calling for her character to grow up. Blakely added "People her age aren't so irresponsible in real life, so hopefully she'll grow up soon."

Gaby begins taking flying lessons and she gets her pilots license, but not before she falls for her instructor, Jack Flynn (Mark Pennell). After a short romance, Gaby leaves for a job in Europe, but she returns two months later and her family cannot understand why. Gaby then reveals she is pregnant and has decided to keep the baby. An Inside Soap columnist said "When she lets slip that the father is no-good flying instructor Jack Flynn, Doug goes berserk and hunts down the man that did his daughter wrong." Gaby doesn't want Jack involved and realises she will be a single mother. Though she has the support of her family. Shortly after Gaby announces her pregnancy, Cheryl Stark (Caroline Gillmer) also announces she is pregnant. Monroe said everyone expects Gaby to give birth first, but "in true Neighbours style" both Gaby and Cheryl go into labour at the same time. Gaby gives birth to a baby boy who is named Zac (Jay Callahan), while Cheryl gives birth to a daughter. Gaby finds it difficult to balance her career and motherhood and she later takes a less stressful job running a branch of Lassiter's in Darwin.

In the 23 October 1993 edition of TV Week, David Brown reported Blakely would be leaving Neighbours, along with Michaelson and Natalie Imbruglia (Beth Brennan). Brown said the actors were expected to film their exit scenes during November. Blakely admitted that her decision to quit the show was not easy, as she "adored" her time there and had made some good friends. After her last day on set, Blakely broke down in tears in the taxi taking her home from the studios. She recalled: It suddenly hit me I was no longer a part of the Neighbours team and I felt really sad. The poor cab driver was so surprised, he pulled over and very kindly lent me his hanky to cry into!" On-screen, Gaby decides to leave Erinsborough, after struggling to care for Zac and deal with her stressful job at Lassiters Hotel. She accepts an offer to manage Outback Artist Tours in Darwin. Gaby also invites Jack to join her as an official pilot for the project, after he convinces her that he will be a good father to Zac. Of this, Blakely said "Motherhood may have softened her determined streak, but Gaby still values her independence. I doubt if it will be smooth sailing all the way. Jack certainly shouldn't take her for granted." In April 2005, Kris Green of Digital Spy confirmed Blakely had reprised her role for the show's 20th anniversary episode, which was broadcast on 27 July 2005.

== Storylines ==
After studying a business course in Japan, Gaby returns to Erinsborough to be with her family. She learns her parents are on the verge of bankruptcy and she poses as a lawyer to get Wilf Turner (Terry Trimble), one of her father's debtors to pay an outstanding debt. Gaby begins making dresses for her friends and neighbours and she decides to open her own boutique in the Lassiter's Complex, with Caroline Alessi (Gillian Blakeney) as her silent partner. The business is successful and profits increase after Glen Donnelly discovers one of Gaby's customers is called Elizabeth Taylor and tells the Erinsborough News. Gaby considers dating Guy Carpenter until she learns he is seeing Caroline. Gaby then turns to Glen and they fall in love. After a brief split, Glen proposes and Gaby accepts. Glen falls from the roof of Lassiter's Hotel and he is paralysed from the waist down. Gaby stands by him, but Glen later flees Erinsborough, leaving Gaby behind. Gaby's aunt, Faye Hudson (Lorraine Bayly) accidentally causes the boutique to burn down and Gaby finds employment at The Waterhole.

Gaby goes through a rebellious phase to cope with her losses and she befriends punk musician, Zed. Gaby competes with her brother, Brad, for the manager's position at the pub, but after confronting their boss, Philip Martin, she is fired. Gaby becomes a secretary at the Robinson Corporation and she is later promoted to manager. Gaby meets Lassiter's client, Simon Hunter, and they begin dating. However, during a weekend away Simon tries to rape Gaby. Gaby presses charges and her father, Doug, hits Simon. Simon blackmails Gaby into dropping the charges, so her father does not get a conviction for assault. Wayne Duncan moves into Ramsay Street and Gaby immediately clashes with him. Her grandfather, Bert (Bud Tingwell), realises she is attracted to Wayne and he tries to get the couple together. Gaby and Wayne admit their feelings for each other and they begin a relationship. Gaby becomes jealous of Wayne's friendship with Annalise Hartman (Kimberly Davies) and when she fails to stand by him after he is accused of murdering biker Cactus (Les Toth), Wayne ends the relationship.

After The Waterhole explodes due to a gas leak, Gaby and Philip have to work together to rebuild it. Lassiter's owner, Paul Robinson (Stefan Dennis), tires of their bickering and sends senior associate Jack Parker (Philip Parslow) to Erinsborough to sort them out and choose which one is most suitable for the manager job. Gaby works hard to impress Jack, but when she steals one of Philip's clients, Jack tells Paul that Philip should be given the managerial position. Philip insists that Gaby stays on as assistant manager and Paul agrees. Gaby begins taking flying lessons and she falls for her instructor, Jack Flynn. They start dating and when Jack admits he is a virgin, Gaby offers to have sex with him. Jack takes Gaby to Tasmania and she falls in love with him. Gaby is devastated when an ex-student of Jack's tells her that he had pretended to be virgin to get her to have sex with him years before. Jack makes advances on Lauren Carpenter (Sarah Vandenbergh) and Gaby's younger sister, Cody (Peta Brady), and Gaby breaks up with him.

Gaby and Annalise go on a flight up the coast, but Gaby is forced to make a crash landing. Both women survive, but they are stranded in the bush for hours until they are rescued by a helicopter on patrol. Gaby meets Stefano (Dino Marnika), a fashion designer who offers her a job as his personal assistant in Milan. Gaby accepts, but two months later she returns to Erinsborough and reveals she is pregnant. Gaby assures her parents that Stefano is not the father and they work out that Jack is. Doug tells Jack that Gaby is carrying his child and he insists on supporting her financially. Gaby is rushed to hospital when she starts bleeding and she is convinced that she is losing the baby. Gaby is relieved when the doctors tells her the bleeding came from the placenta and she is told to rest. Gaby goes into labour with her mother and sister by her side and she gives birth to a son, who she names Shannon. Cheryl Stark gives birth to her daughter at the same time and also names her Shannon.

When Doug registers the birth he decides to name his grandson, Zachary. Gaby is not happy, but realises she likes the shortened version of the name, Zac. Jack turns up, wanting to be part of his son's life and Gaby refuses at first. However, when she sees how much Jack wants to be a father, she relents. Rosemary Daniels (Joy Chambers) offers Gaby a job managing the new Lassiter's branch in Darwin and Gaby accepts. When Jack learns of Gaby's decision, he decides to move up north too. After attending a naming ceremony, Gaby, Jack and Zac leave for Darwin. Gaby later appears in Annalise's documentary about Ramsay Street and reveals she is still in Darwin, managing Lassiter's.

== Reception ==
The BBC said Gaby's most notable moment was "Surviving a plane crash with Annalise." A writer for Inside Soap said "Gorgeous Gaby has had so many job changes she would make a great careers adviser!" The added that if only her love life had been as successful as her employment record. Another writer stated Gaby and Glen had Ramsay Street's biggest on-off romance since Scott (Jason Donovan) and Charlene (Kylie Minogue). During a feature on Neighbours, Anna Pickard of The Guardian tried to choose the characters she would be most starstruck by if she met them. She said "It would have to be the Willis family. All of them. Pam, Doug, Adam, Gaby, Brad and Cody".

In September 2014, Mark James Lowe from All About Soap called for Gaby's return to Neighbours following the reappearances of Brad, Doug and Pam. He commented, "we last saw a glimpse of her almost a decade ago in Annalise's documentary… so we desperately want to know what Gaby's been up to since!" In 2015, Lowe colleague Kerry Barrett placed Gaby at number 26 on the magazine's list of 30 favourite Neighbours characters. Barrett quipped "Smart Gaby was clever, stylish, successful and could even fly a plane!". Barrett thought Gaby's had a lot of "unsuitable boyfriends" and her best moment was "crash landing her plane."
