= Dan Falzon =

Australian actor of Maltese descent

- Born: 24 November 1972 (age 53); Melbourne, Australia
- Occupations: Actor; musician; paramedic; businessman
- Years active: 1992–2019 (acting)
- Known for: Neighbours as Rick Alessi
- Children: 1

Dan Falzon (born 24 November 1972) is an Australian actor, known for his role as Rick Alessi on the television soap opera Neighbours from 1992 until 1995.

== Early and personal life ==
Falzon was born in Melbourne, and he and his two brothers grew up on the Mornington Peninsula. His parents were school teachers. He is of Maltese descent from his father. After he was cast as the lead in a school production of Macbeth when he was ten years old, Falzon realised that he wanted to become an actor. He appeared in various television commercials and worked as a model. He was also a hockey player and came close to being selected for the national hockey team.

Falzon is married and has a daughter.

== Career ==
After appearing in the children's television series Kelly II, Falzon was asked to audition for both Neighbours and Home and Away. He chose to accept the role of Rick Alessi in Neighbours, as it meant he got to stay with his family in Melbourne. Falzon released a book My Diary: Intimate Secrets of Neighbour Dan Falzon in 1995. The part-diary, part-scrap book follows Falzon's childhood and his time in Neighbours. After leaving Neighbours in 1995, Falzon moved to Darwin. He formed the short-lived pop group Milk with his brother, releasing the single "Seventeen" in 1997, a cover of the 1979 hit "7 Teen" by The Regents, produced by Ray "Madman" Hedges.

He appeared in the 2004 Nine Network television film The Alice, as a park ranger. He briefly became a YouTuber and uploaded a video featuring an alien welcoming viewers to the Galactic Federation of Light. In 2019, he played Shane the Copper in the SBS comedy television series Robbie Hood.

After leaving the acting industry, Falzon became a paramedic for St John Ambulance in Alice Springs. Along with his brothers Tom and Ben, he appeared in the Nine Network documentary Outback Paramedic. Along with their father, the brothers set up and manage Earth Sanctuary, an ecology, culture and astronomy tourism business. Outback Brothers, a documentary filmed over 10 years, follows their work at Earth Sanctuary. In April 2025, Falzon and Earth Sanctuary appeared in the British television show Gary Barlow's Food and Wine Tour: Australia, which features musicians Gary Barlow and Ronan Keating taking an astro tour during their time at the sanctuary.
