= Felice Arena =

Australian children's author, actor and playwright

- Born: Kyabram, Victoria, Australia
- Occupations: Novelist; children's writer; illustrator; actor
- Writing career
- Years active: 1991–
- Website: felicearena.com

Felice Arena is an Australian children's author and illustrator. He created and co-wrote the football-themed Specky Magee series; the historical novels The Boy and the Spy, Fearless Frederic, A Great Escape and The Unstoppable Flying Flanagan; and the picture books Pasta!, Cheese! and My Big Secret.

== Early life ==
Arena was born in Kyabram, Victoria. He studied teaching at La Trobe University in Bendigo, Victoria and graduated in 1990. He decided to pursue a career in acting and writing. In 1992, he was cast as Marco Alessi in the Australian soap opera Neighbours. A year later, he relocated to the UK and was appearing in the West End when he began writing his first book in his dressing room.

== Writing career ==
When he returned to Australia, Arena asked friend and Australian rules football player Garry Lyon for football advice for a book idea. Lyon told Arena that he would like to help write the book and they worked together to create Specky Magee. Eight books in the Specky Magee series were published between 2002 and 2011. Arena adapted his 2017 novel The Boy and the Spy for the stage in Geneva, before it was performed at St Margaret's Berwick Grammar School. His four-part series Besties was released in 2020. From 2018 - 2022 Arena released his CBCA notable middle-grade historical books Fearless Frederic and A Great Escape. His historical novel The Unstoppable Flying Flanagan was long-listed for the ARA Historical Awards. Most recently Arena's picture books Pasta!,Cheese! and My Big Secret were released.

== Books ==
- Wish (2005)
- Stick Dudes #1 Water Fight Frenzy (2009)
- Stick Dudes #2 Champions of the World (July 2010)
- Stick Dudes #3 The Secret Four-ce (July 2010)
- Farticus Maximus #1 Other Stories that Stink! Australia (2008) UK (April 2010) Canada (Sept 2011)
- Farticus Maximus # 2 Stink-Off Battle of the Century Australia (2009) UK (April 2011) Canada (January 2012)
- Farticus Maximus # 3 Bottomus Burps of Britannia (Oct. 2010)
- Whippersnapper (August 2011)
- Andy Roid and the Superhuman Secret (April 2012)
- Andy Roid and the Field Trip of Terror (April 2012)
- Andy Roid and the Camp Howl Crusaders (July 2012)
- Andy Roid and the Heroes of the Night (July 2012)
- Andy Roid and the Turbine Runaways (Oct 2012)
- Andy Roid and the Sinister Showdown (Oct 2012)
- Andy Roid and the Unexpected Mission (Aug 2013)
- Andy Roid and the Tracks of Death (Aug 2013)
- Andy Roid and the Missing Agent (Sept 2013)
- Andy Roid and the Avalanche of Evil (Sept 2013)
- Sporty Kids – Footy! (May 2015)
- Sporty Kids – Swimming! (May 2015)
- Sporty Kids – Tennis! (August 2015)
- Sporty Kids – Soccer! (August 2015)
- Sporty Kids – Basketball! (April 2016)
- Sporty Kids – Handball! (April 2016)
- Sporty Kids – Cricket! (October 2016)
- Sporty Kids – Netball! (October 2016)
- Sporty Kids – Little Athletics! (February 2017)
- The Boy and the Spy (April 2017)
- Fearless Frederic (April 2018)
- A Great Escape (March 2019)
- The Besties to the Rescue (January 2020)
- The Besties Show and Smell (January 2020)
- The Besties Party On (June 2020)
- The Besties Make a Splash (June 2020)
- The Unstoppable Flying Flanagan (March 2022)

== Picture books ==
- Sally and Dave, A Slug Story Australia (2007) US (2008)
- Hey, Cat! (June 2008)
- Pasta! Australia (April 2023) Pasta! These Names are Fun to Say (October 2024)
- Cheese! October 2024
- My Big Secret February 2025

== Specky Magee ==
The Specky Magee series, written by Arena and his former schoolmate and Melbourne Football Club star Garry Lyon, have also been shortlisted for Australian Children Choice awards—including three-time winner of the Young Australian Best Book Award. There are eight books in the series.

- The Specky Magee series (co-written with Garry Lyon):

Specky Magee (2002)
Specky Magee & the great footy contest! (2003)
Specky Magee and the Season of Champions (2004)
Specky Magee and the Boots of Glory (2005)
Specky Magee and a Legend in the Making (2006)
Specky Magee and the Spirit of the Game (2007)
Specky Magee and the Battle of the Young Gun (2009)
Specky Magee and the best of Oz (2011)

== As contributor ==
- Arena, Felice (2007). "Contributor". Laugh Even Louder!. By Camp Quality. Gosford, New South Wales: Scholastic Australia Pty Limited. ISBN 978-1-74169-022-4.
