= Stonefish Rebecchi =

Fictional character from Neighbours

- Neighbours character
- Portrayed by: Anthony Engelman
- Duration: 1994–1996, 2003, 2007, 2015–2018
- First appearance: 31 March 1994
- Last appearance: 12 February 2018
- Introduced by: Alan Coleman (1994); Stanley Walsh (1995); Ric Pellizzeri (2003); Jason Herbison (2015)
- Spin-off appearances: Summer Stories (2017)
In-universe information
- Occupation: Student; Coffee Shop waiter Mechanic
- Father: Kevin Rebecchi
- Mother: Angie Rebecchi
- Brothers: Shane Rebecchi; Toadie Rebecchi
- Wife: Chantelle Rebecchi
- Aunts: Coral Reeves
- Nieces: Nell Rebecchi

Kevin Rebecchi (commonly known as "Stonefish" or "Stonie") is a fictional character from the Australian soap opera Neighbours, played by Anthony Engelman. He made his first appearance on 31 March 1994. Stonefish was the first of the Rebecchi family to appear and he was later followed by his mother, father and brothers. The character left in 1996, but returned briefly in 2003. In 2007, Engelman reprised his character again and Stonefish returned to Ramsay Street. He departed on 28 August 2007. The character then returned for brief guest stints from 2015 until 2018.

== Creation and casting ==
Anthony Engelman had previously appeared in the serial as a bully a few years prior to re-joining as Stonefish. He told a writer for Inside Soap that his first script said that the character got his nickname because he looked like a stonefish. The actor quipped "They'd written that before they'd even cast me! When I got my script I was like 'What the hell does a stonefish look like anyway?!'" Engelman believed he would be in the show for around "a month or two doing a couple of episodes", however, he became part of the regular cast. He said "It's just grown from there and I'm really very lucky. The producers have given me a little bit more to do, a bit more room to move and that's given me more confidence. Now I have more challenges, which is great because I don't want to become complacent." Stonefish became the first member of the Rebecchi family to be introduced. He was later joined by his mother, father, brother and cousin.

== Development ==
A writer for Inside Soap said Stonefish was happiest causing a stir in the classroom, and that wherever there was trouble, you could bet he was involved. Stonefish arrived in Ramsay Street after believing Brett Stark (Brett Blewitt) had started dating his girlfriend Sassy Patterson-Smythe (Defah Dattner). Engelman said Stonefish was usually easy going, but he became really jealous. However, when Sassy moved out of the picture, Stonefish and Brett become great friends. When Stonefish fell behind with his studies, Cody Willis (Peta Brady) helped him out, making Stonefish think she was romantically interested in him. Engelman said, "He's really got the hots for her, but when he makes a pass at her at a party it all goes horribly wrong." The actor said he had a lot in common with his character, as he had a tough time at school too and did not have much luck with girls.

When asked if Stonefish would ever get a girlfriend or roam around Ramsay Street in his stonewash denim forever, Engelman replied "Life gets much better for Stonefish. There might even be romance on the horizon, but I'm afraid he'll always be a dag." Stonefish later stole some exam papers from Erinsborough High and he sold them to Rick Alessi (Dan Falzon), who wanted to help Cody when she fell behind with her revision. When Rick gave Cody the papers, she had second thoughts about cheating. Stonefish eventually grew up and became a "reformed bully". He and his family – mother Angie (Lesley Baker), father Kevin (Don Bridges), brothers Shane (Greg O'Meara) and Toadfish Rebecchi (Ryan Moloney) – moved into Number 32 Ramsay Street. An Inside Soap columnist called the Rebecchi family "dodgy" and said the residents should nail down their valuables and lock up their daughters. The character left in 1996.

Stonefish made a brief return in 2003 for his brother Toadie's wedding to Dee Bliss (Madeleine West). After Toadie accidentally drove the wedding car off a cliff and into the sea, Stonie helped to save his brother. In August 2007, Stonefish returned to Neighbours to "cause some trouble for little brother Toadie". Stonie came to stay with Toadie following marital problems. He was also battling a drug problem and when Toadie learned of this, he threw Stonie out. But Toadie's girlfriend Stephanie Scully (Carla Bonner) took pity on Stonie and allowed him to move back in. Engleman did not hesitate to return to the show upon learning that Stonie would be going through a "rocky time" in his life. He was pleased to play out such an interesting storyline for his character, saying "In some ways, I felt drama was missing from Stonie's storylines in the past. He was always just chasing girls or trying to get rich quick."

In August 2015, it was confirmed that Engelman had reprised his role. The actor told Sarah Ellis of Inside Soap that he had thought about returning to the show after watching the Neighbours 30th: The Stars Reunite documentary. A few days later, his agent contacted him to say that Neighbours wanted him back as Stonie for a short stint. Stonie returned to Erinsborough on 9 September. He came to visit Toadie, who had recently suffered a fall that left him paralysed. Ellis observed, "Stonie's arrival comes just as the right time – and he proves to be exactly the tonic his brother needs." Lesley Baker (Angie) was pleased to be reunited with Engelman, saying that she wished they could have spent more time together, as he and Moloney are fun to work with. Engelman also said that if he were to return again, he wanted more focus on getting to know his family, as he believed it would be fun getting the whole clan back together. The character returned again on 4 May 2016, and appeared in December, where he shows Toadie a photo of a woman he believes to be Dee.

On 17 January 2018, it was announced that Engelman had reprised the role again, along with several other returning cast members, for a feature-length special episode, which aired on 12 February 2018. The episode centres on a belated 21st birthday party for Toadie.

== Storylines ==
Stonefish mistakenly believes his girlfriend, Sassy, has been seeing Brett Stark. Stonefish punches Brett and then continues to hassle him. Brett's friend, Michael Martin (Troy Beckwith) later punches Stonie after he continues to hassle Brett. Stonie later mellows and joins a band formed by the local teens including Brett, Michael, Brett's sister, Danni (Eliza Szonert) and Cody Willis. When the others vote Sassy out due to her terrible singing voice, Stonie threatens to quit. When the Debutante Ball arrives to celebrate the centenary of Erinsborough, Stonie attends with Sassy as his date. The evening goes well but descend into chaos when a catfight between Sassy and Cody starts and Stonie is caught in a scrap with Cody's date, Rick Alessi.

Stonie later moves into Ramsay street with his family. At the start of 1995, He finds himself an unwitting Guinea Pig in an experiment conducted by Brett and the newly arrived Libby Kennedy (Kym Valentine), who want to see if they can get the most unlikely candidate elected as school captain. Brett agrees to be Stonie's campaign manager. It all seems to be going well until Danni reveals the truth to Stonie who turns his anger on Brett. Instead of hitting Brett, Stonie decides to teach him a lesson by swapping roles with Brett as the candidate and Stonie as the campaign manager. Brett loses out to Keiran Wallace and both boys put school politics behind them.

Stonie later falls for Cody, who is still involved with Rick. After Cody ends things with Rick, they become a couple but it is a difficult relationship as Cody is at University and Stonie is still in high school on his third attempt at Year 12. Stonie later lodges with Danni and her boyfriend, Malcolm Kennedy (Benjamin McNair) when they move out of home and are soon joined by Stonie's mother Angie and brother Toadfish. Number 32 soon becomes home to the Rebecchi family after Mal and Danni move back home.

As Stonie begins studying for his HSC, he calls on Annalise Hartman (Kimberly Davies) to tutor him in English and Maths. Stonie kisses Annalise one day, but she rebuffs him as she is in a relationship with Sam Kratz. After months of sexual tension, Annalise and Stonefish sleep together only for Angie to come home and discover the affair. Annalise confesses all to Sam, who later punches Stonie when he sees him in Annalise's hotel room. Upon starting University, Stonie falls for Catherine O'Brien (Radha Mitchell) and is willing to go to any lengths to impress her, including pretending to be a vegetarian and getting involved in environmental issues. This is cut short when Catherine returns to Tasmania to look after her mother Bess (Diana McLean).

When Stonie and Malcolm buy a car together, they are horrified to learn its previous owners were drug dealers and the stash is still inside. The drug squad arrive and arrange a stakeout. During a scuffle between the police and the dealers, who return to recover the drugs, a gunshot is fired through the window of Number 30 and Cody is shot. A week later, Cody dies in hospital and Stonie is devastated. He then puts on a tribute for her at her memorial service. Catherine returns and Stonie is elated but is soon disappointed when he finds she doesn't want to be with him any more. Stonie decides to go up North with Angie to rejoin his father Big Kev (Don Bridges).

Stonie returns to Erinsborough to serve as best man at Toadie's wedding to Dione Bliss. During the visit, Stonie admits that he is jealous of his younger brother for graduating university, becoming a lawyer and preparing to settle down, whereas he has spent the past several years working in their parents Roadhouse. On the day of the wedding, Toadie and Dee's car veers off the road and into the sea. Stonie and Toadie's housemate Stuart Parker (Blair McDonough) pull Toadie to safety but there is no sign of Dee who is presumed drowned. When Toadie returns to spot where the accident happens and begins wading into the sea, Stonie manages to stop his brother from committing suicide. Realising there is they can do little to help Toadie out of his grief, Stonie, Kev and Angie return home.

Four years later, Stonie returns to Ramsay Street to stay with Toadie. Stonie reveals he is now married to a woman named Chantelle (Claire Chitham), but he mentions they are now separated. It becomes apparent that he is smoking marijuana. Whilst smoking, he throws the butt over the fence to Number 30 and Frazer Yeats (Ben Lawson) discovers it and immediately assumes Toadie is the one smoking it. After another butt is thrown over the fence before Frazer's eyes, he looks over the fence and spots Stonie alone. After a mishap where Charlie Hoyland accidentally discovers the marijuana, Stonie then comes clean to Toadie and Charlie's mother, Steph and explains he is depressed because he and Chantelle were trying for a baby and they are not having much luck. Chantelle comes to Ramsay Street to sort her husband out. Stonie announces he is giving up marijuana. However, just as he is about to throw the rest in the bin, he holds onto it. Chantelle gives him an ultimatum: her or the marijuana. Stonie chooses her and throws out the marijuana, and they return to Port Keats.

After learning that Toadie has been paralysed in an accident, Stonie returns to Erinsborough to visit him. He organises a day of pizza and wrestling, but Karl Kennedy (Alan Fletcher) interrupts to invite them to a seminar at the hospital. Toadie's wife Sonya (Eve Morey) then tells Stonie that it would be best if Toadie attends the seminar and Stonie encourages his brother to go. Toadie later meets up with Stonie and tells him the seminar was a cover for a benefit in his honour. Stonie explains that the community just want to show that they care and they attend the benefit together. Sonya thanks Stonie for getting Toadie back. Stonie announces that he has to return home to Chantelle and says his goodbyes. Months later, Stonefish stops by on the way back from Newcastle, where he has been looking for someone at Toadie's request. He tells Toadie that he could not find the person at the address he had and urges Toadie to talk to Sonya. After staying for a cup of tea with Sonya, Stonie leaves for Port Keats. After a visit to Colac, Stonie sends Toadie a photograph of a woman he believes to be Toadie's former wife Dee. Toadie asks him to come to Erinsborough and Stonie explains that he was taking photographs with a new camera and saw the picture when he got home.

== Reception ==
Sue Malins of the Daily Mirror thought Stonefish was "one of the show's most unattractive males." During Stonie's affair with Annalise, Tony Purnell dubbed him "the romeo with a ring in his ear". Jon Peake for Inside Soap called Stonefish "irritating". While Larissa Dubecki from The Age commented that he was "unfortunately named". Of the character's 2007 return, a reporter for the Evening Chronicle said "Stonefish was always a rogue when he was originally a Ramsay Street resident and things aren't much better now he's back." The reporter added Stonefish was a bad influence on his younger brother, Toadie. A reporter for Channel 5 branded him a "larrikin". A reporter from What's on TV criticised the character's love life stating that "loudmouth Stonefish may be to love and romance what Cheryl Stark is to WeightWatchers, but it seems he may have hit the right note with Cody."
