= Sam Kratz =

- Neighbours character
- Portrayed by: Richard Grieve
- Duration: 1994–1996, 2005, 2025
- First appearance: 13 June 1994
- Last appearance: 4 December 2025
- Introduced by: Stanley Walsh (1994); Ric Pellizerri (2005); Jason Herbison (2025)
In-universe information
- Occupation: Handyman; Model
- Father: Patrick Kratz
- Mother: Sarah Kratz
- Wife: Annalise Hartman
- Grandfathers: Hector Kratz
- Grandmothers: Marlene Kratz
- Aunts: Cheryl Stark
- First cousins: Janine Stark; Darren Stark; Danni Stark; Brett Stark; Lolly Allen

Sam Kratz is a fictional character from the Australian television soap opera Neighbours, played by Richard Grieve. Grieve was unsure about attending the audition for the character when he learned that producers were looking for "a mega-hunk". He borrowed a leather jacket to make himself look more like the character, and he was told that he had the role a week after the audition. He relocated to Melbourne for filming and Neighbours marked his first major television role. He made his first appearance during the episode broadcast on 13 June 1994. The character was created following the departure of the serial's male "pin-up" Brad Willis (Scott Michaelson). He was given immediate links to other characters through his grandmother, Marlene Kratz (Moya O'Sullivan), who asks him to check on her recent house purchase. Grieve described his character as friendly, laid-back, upfront, and a "natural guy". He wanted to be more like Sam, as he did not worry as much as Grieve or have a bad temper.

Sam's passion is his motorbike and he is often seen in leathers. Grieve admitted that scenes of him riding the bike were "camera trickery" as he did not have a licence. Sam is popular with the female characters. He befriends Serendipity Gottlieb (Raelee Hill) and they have a brief relationship. Sam later attracts the attentions of school student Squirrel (Brooke Howden), who develops a crush on him. She announces that she is pregnant with his child, despite them never having sex. The situation occurs at bad time for Sam, who is experiencing a "downward spiral". However, it also brings him and Annalise Hartman (Kimberley Davies) closer, as she believes he is innocent. There was an instant attraction between Sam and Annalise, but writers kept her with Mark Gottlieb (Bruce Samazan), until their wedding day in the 1994 season finale, where Mark broke up with her. Davies thought Sam was the type of man her character would normally go for.

In order to facilitate Davies' departure from the show, writers scripted an affair between Annalise and Sam's friend Stonefish Rebecchi (Anthony Engelman), which he discovers during the 1995 season finale. Grieve admitted to being taken aback by the storyline, but found it to be both challenging and rewarding. Sam and Stonie's friendship is badly impacted by the affair and Sam becomes embittered. Later storylines saw him embark on a career as a model and establish a relationship with Cody Willis (Peta Brady). For his portrayal of Sam, Grieve was nominated for Most Popular Newcomer at the National Television Awards in 1995. Critics also branded him a "heart-throb", a "hunk" and a "rough diamond". At the time, Grieve received the most fan mail out of all the male actors. Grieve quit Neighbours in early 1996 to pursue his career overseas, and his departure aired on 21 June 1996. Grieve reprised his role for the show's 20th anniversary episode in July 2005, and for a guest stint on 13 August 2025 until 4 December 2025.

== Casting ==
After appearing in various theatre productions and small guest roles in E Street and Newlyweds, Grieve was offered the chance to audition for Neighbours. He was unsure about attending after learning that the casting directors were looking for "a mega-hunk" and he did not think that he fit the description. However, he borrowed a leather jacket from a friend to make himself look a bit like the character of Sam and he was told that he had the role a week later. He admitted that "No-one was more surprised than me." He also revealed that he used to watch the serial and had hoped that he would be able to join it or something similar. Grieve relocated from Sydney to Melbourne for filming, and Neighbours marked his first major television role. His character was created to fill the void left by the departure of "pin-up boy" Brad Willis (played by Scott Michaelson). Grieve later stated that he had no regrets about taking on a continuing role on the soap, saying "I'm thrilled with the way things have gone. I was very nervous when I first started because it was a long-running job but it's turned out well." Grieve made his first appearance as Sam during the episode broadcast on 13 June 1994.

== Development ==
=== Characterisation and introduction ===
The character's introduction sees him arrive on Ramsay Street, after his grandmother, Marlene Kratz (Moya O'Sullivan) asks him to check out the house she has purchased. He befriends Brett Stark (Brett Blewitt) and Danni Stark (Eliza Szonert), who starts to look up to him, as she thinks he is "glamorous". When Marlene arrives in town, she tells Sam that Brett and Danni are actually his cousins. Describing his character, Grieve told Amanda Ruben from TV Week: "Sam is just an upfront, natural guy, who gets around on his friendly charm." The actor said Sam's main passion is his motorbike. He also displays "a love of freedom" which makes him loath to settle down. Grieve admitted that Sam's motorbike scenes were "camera trickery" as he did not have a driver's licence. Ruben revealed that Sam would secure a job at the local coffee shop and his "rugged good looks" would make him popular. Brett Thomas of The Age observed that Sam "causes much delight among the female population of Erinsborough – he is always dressed in bike leathers, or some grubby work clothes and is quite unaware of his rampant sex appeal."

Grieve felt embarrassed by his character's wardrobe, describing some of the casual wear as "horrendous" and adding "He's got a couple of blue vests that may have looked trendy in the 70s, but now look decidedly naff!" Serena Coneele from Inside Soap described Sam as being good-looking and nice, but revealed that he would have a few secrets up his sleeve. Grieve told the writer, "Sam's unreal, I'd love to be more like him. I worry a lot more than he does and I've got a really bad temper. He's friendly and laid-back, and before long, he knows everyone in Erinsborough. He's that kind of guy!" The actor added that wherever Sam went, trouble and disaster seemed to follow him around. Josephine Monroe, author of Neighbours: The First 10 Years, stated that after a shaky start, Sam became popular in Ramsay Street. She also wrote that "Sam may look rough, with his stubble and oil stains, but he has proven himself to be a rough diamond." Grieve later admitted that he would have liked Sam to have had more of a dark side, as he could be too good to be true at times.

=== Serendipity Gottlieb and Squirrel ===
Writers created a close friendship between Sam and Serendipity Gottlieb (Raelee Hill), and Pauline Cronin of Sunday World reported that the characters were set to begin a romantic relationship. Hill said it was a case of opposites attract, explaining "If only romances in Neighbours ever got a chance to get off the ground, then perhaps Sam and Serendipity could be destined for a big relationship. But you get the feeling right from the start that they're both going to move onto other people pretty fast – it's the way things happen in Neighbours." Sam and Ren's romance gets off to a bad start when Sam grows jealous of her friend Paulo Cechero (Hannes Berger), something that Hill hoped the pair would get over quickly, as she was keen to work closer with Grieve. She called him "one of the best friends I've ever had", revealing that he helped her settle in when she joined the cast. They also socialised during their spare time.

After Sam chaperones a high school dance, he attracts the attentions of Squirrel (Brooke Howden), a young student who becomes "glued to him like a fly in Vegemite." When Sam goes away on holiday with the students, Squirrel makes it clear that she has more than a crush on him. She eventually corners him and announces that she is pregnant with his child. Grieve revealed "Squirrel turns out to be a bit of a psycho! She is pregnant and she's convinced herself that Sam is the father, but he can't be because they haven't even slept together." Inside Soap's Victoria Ross commented that the Squirrel situation comes about just as Sam's life seems to be on "a general downward spiral". He had spent weeks fighting his feelings for Annalise Hartman (Kimberley Davies), who was due to get married. When her wedding was called off, Sam provided Annalise with a shoulder to cry on. But before he could declare his feelings for her, Squirrel's revelation made him think twice. Grieve told Ross, "Sam doesn't tell anyone about Squirrel's accusation because he's convinced that no one will believe his story, especially Annalise. When Sam eventually tells Annalise about Squirrel's accusations, their relationship turns around because she totally believes his story and agrees to stick by him. Their friendship grows into something more serious so I suppose Squirrel did him a favour."

=== Relationship with Annalise Hartman ===
Sue Malins of the Daily Mirror observed that it had been "lust at first sight" between Sam and Annalise, but writers kept her with Mark Gottlieb (Bruce Samazan), so any potential romance "seemed doomed before it had begun." Davies told Malins that there was an attraction between Annalise and Sam, but she also has strong feelings for Mark, and even though their relationship is often on-off, it eventually results in their engagement. However, Sam "will not surrender Annalise without a struggle" even as she plans her wedding. In the 1994 season finale, Annalise is jilted at the altar by Mark, ending their relationship and leading scriptwriters to establish one between her and Sam. Davies said Sam was "tall, dark and handsome" and the type of man she always thought her character would go for. She did not think Mark and Annalise had been well suited, saying that "in the end they obviously weren't." Davies also noted that it was possibly too soon for Annalise to enter into a new relationship and she herself would take a long time if she had gone through a similar break up. Grieve was excited to be working with Davies on the storyline, commenting "it's very easy for me when I'm playing Sam to be in awe of her."

Grieve admitted to being so nervous about filming his first kissing scene with Davies that he almost got stage fright. He was supposed to be portraying Sam as "a romantic hero", looking relaxed and loving, but Grieve said he was "shaking in my shoes" and thought the scene would be a mess. The kiss was filmed in front of around 45 people, which did not help the portrayal of a romantic moment, and Grieve did not know Davies that well, having only worked together briefly. The scene turned out well and when Sam and Annalise's relationship "took off a short time later", he and Davies had become such good friends that their kissing scenes were fun to film.

In order to facilitate Davies' departure from the show, writers scripted an affair between Annalise and Stonefish Rebecchi (Anthony Engelman). Sam discovers the affair when he and Stonie's mother Angie Rebecchi (Lesley Baker) catch the pair drinking champagne in bed during the 1995 season finale. The affair was a surprise to all the actors involved, and Grieve admitted to being taken aback by the storyline. He told Caron James from TV Week: "I was thinking, 'Why rock the boat?'" However, he realised that it would be a good acting opportunity for him, as he found it "very challenging", fun and "really, really rewarding." The increasing tension suffered by Sam and Annalise also affected Grieve and Davies, as they had to film multiple scenes featuring them bickering. Grieve explained: "Kimberly and I felt it was a bit too hard and negative. We kept saying, 'This is awful! Can't we just be happy and go on picnics again?'" In addition to Sam and Annalise's relationship ending, the affair negatively impacts Sam and Stonie's friendship. Grieve said that "there are certainly no holds barred in terms of the reactions the three characters have."

=== Later storylines, departure and returns ===
After discovering Annalise's affair, Sam temporarily departs the show, but returns "a changed man". He has become "embittered" and is "hell-bent on making Annalise pay for her deeds." He is also accompanied by his "evil" friend James Grimmer (Matthew Parkinson).

The character embarks on a new career path after Marlene enters him into a "Grandchild of the Year" competition and he is spotted by the editor of Teen Girl magazine. Sam is asked to model for the magazine and is pleasantly surprised when he is offered "a generous sum of money" to be the face of a new Stefano Gold aftershave campaign. The offer of money leaves Sam "unable to resist" and he signs the contract, however, during his first photoshoot he learns that he is expected to pose in the nude. A writer for Inside Soap quipped "He's always been a man of principle, but perhaps the glitz and glamour of a career in modelling have got the better of him. Still, the thought of the rest of Ramsay Street seeing him in the nude could turn him of the idea. And whatever would Marlene say?" The writer noted that if Sam keeps his clothes on, it would be the perfect opportunity to show everyone that he is more than "a pretty face".

Sam has a brief romance with Cody Willis (Peta Brady). Following her death in March 1996, he is left "inconsolable". Cody's ghost later appears to a slightly drunken Sam and tells him to get on with his life.

Grieve decided to quit Neighbours in early 1996, so he could travel to the UK to appear in the West End production of Grease. His departure occurred at a time when the serial had lost four other actors from its main cast, including Brady and Blewitt. As Grieve was filming his final scenes, his agent informed him that his application for a British work visa had been turned down, following a "crackdown" on Australian actors working in the British acting industry. Grieve commented: "I was aware that there could be difficulties. I'm trying to look on the bright side." He insisted that he had been ready to leave Neighbours despite the setback and writers had his character "ride into the sunset." Grieve hoped to secure theatre work in Australia instead.

In July 2005, Grieve reprised his role for the show's 20th anniversary episode, "Friends for Twenty Years". Grieve reprised the role twenty years later, as Sam comes back to Erinsborough. He immediately "clashes" with his former wife Annalise, who confirmed their split at the start of her own guest stint.

== Storylines ==
Sam arrives in Ramsay Street when his grandmother Marlene buys Number 24 Ramsay Street from Madge Bishop (Anne Charleston). Sam moves into the house but mistakenly sells the furniture belonging to Lou Carpenter (Tom Oliver), the previous tenant instead of the old furniture Marlene has shipped to the house. This leads to Lou suspecting Sam of being dodgy but ultimately changes his mind after the mistake is explained. Sam quickly makes friends with local teenagers Brett and Danni Stark who live next door at Number 22 with their mother Cheryl Stark (Caroline Gillmer) and Lou and is later told by Marlene that the Stark kids and Cheryl are his cousins and aunt, respectively.

Annalise Hartman catches Sam's eye, but she is engaged to Mark Gottlieb (Bruce Samazan) who she is living with. Squirrel, one of Brett and Danni's classmates, takes a liking to Sam after he chaperones a dance. Sam rebuffs Squirrel, but she later returns and tells him he is the father of her baby. This is proved to be untrue when Danni urges Squirrel to confess. When Annalise returns after a holiday to get over Mark jilting her at the altar and later a cancer scare, Sam confesses his love for her and the two become an item. Sam's father, Patrick (Shane Porteous) arrives in Erinsborough keen to build bridges with his son but Sam is less than eager to reconcile with him as he and his mother had often left Sam in Marlene's care as a child while they furthered their careers. Sam is further angered when Patrick tells him that he has separated from Sarah, Sam's mother. The two men eventually reconcile after going on a Bush Retreat.

Sam notices Annalise becoming more and more distant and shows disinterest in their sex life. It soon emerges that Annalise is having an affair with Stonefish Rebecchi (Anthony Engelman). Sam is upset and throws Annalise out. Things are not helped when Sam goes to visit Annalise at a motel and finds Stonie there. This results in Sam punching Stonie. Sam and Annalise try to salvage their relationship, but are unable to and Annalise leaves for London. Sam later becomes a male model for Stefano Gold and has a relationship with Cody Willis (Peta Brady). This is cut short when Cody is shot during a siege with drug dealers and dies a week later in hospital. Sam blames himself and grieves her death until Cody appears to him as a ghost during a whisky-induced hallucination and tells him to get on with his life. When Sam wakes up, he finds one of Cody's rings in his hand.

Annalise later gets in touch with Sam and tells him she wants to reconcile in London and they can travel Europe together. Sam jumps at the chance and leaves after attending the wedding of Annalise's sister Joanna (Emma Harrison) to Rob Evans (Graham Harvey). Sam sells his Handy Sam's business to Malcolm Kennedy (Benjamin McNair). Sam and Annalise marry. Five years later, Sam appears in Annalise's documentary about Ramsay Street and says the girls were the best reason to live on Ramsay Street, although Annalise was the only one for him. When Annalise returns to Erinsborough 20 years later, she reveals that she and Sam are separated.

== Reception ==
For his portrayal of Sam, Grieve received a nomination for Most Popular Newcomer at the 1st National Television Awards in 1995. He was also nominated for the Sexiest Male in Soap accolade at the 1996 Inside Soap Awards.

The Age's Brett Thomas reported favourably on Grieve's casting as part of the newspaper's "Television This Week" feature. He wrote "Hunk alert, hunk alert! The casting move guaranteed to give any teen soap a bit of extra zing – the introduction of a new heartthrob – occurs on Neighbours this week when 24-year-old Richard Grieve joins the crew." Thomas also compared Sam to Grant Show's Melrose Place character Jake Hanson, adding that fans of that show "may sense a touch of the Jake factor here." When he made his debut in the UK, Serena Coneele from Inside Soap stated "At long last, a hunk who isn't squeaky clean is about to burn into Ramsay Street on a motorbike! Sam Kratz looks set to get the Erinsborough women running hell for leather to their make-up bags, and with his smouldering looks, it's not difficult to see why."

A reporter for the Weekly News called the character "kind-hearted" and a "heart-throb". They reported that Grieve received "the biggest sack of fan mail" out of all the male actors, and he said that fans often gave him advice on what his character should do, while others told him about their troubles. Josephine Monroe commented that Sam was "a handsome biker always on the edge of the law". John Millar from the Daily Record thought Sam was "a few shrimps short of the barbie" and added "I have had grave fears about Sam's sanity ever since I spotted a poster for the Elvis film flop Harum Scarum on his wall. If he thought that was good, then there's no hope for him."

The Sun-Herald's Pamela Jane called Sam "sexy", while her colleague Rachel Browne branded him a "motor bike-riding rough diamond". When Sam and Annalise began dating, Sue Malins of the Daily Mirror said "the next red-hot Ramsay Street romance is about to start sizzling." A writer for the BBC's Neighbours website said that Sam's most notable moment was "Confessing his love for Annalise." While Joe Julians of Digital Spy thought Sam was "perhaps best remembered for his relationship with Annalise Hartman, which almost came to an abrupt end when he discovered she and Stonefish Rebecchi were having an affair."
