= Marlene Kratz =

Fictional character from Neighbours

- Neighbours character
- Portrayed by: Moya O'Sullivan
- Duration: 1994–1997, 2005
- First appearance: 5 July 1994
- Last appearance: 27 July 2005
- Introduced by: Stanley Walsh (1994); Ric Pellizerri (2005)
In-universe information
- Occupation: Cosmetics salesperson; Bric-a-brac shop owner; Receptionist
- Husband: Hector Kratz
- Sons: Patrick Kratz
- Daughters: Cheryl Stark
- Grandsons: Sam Kratz; Darren Stark; Brett Stark
- Granddaughters: Janine Stark; Danni Stark; Lolly Allen

Marlene Kratz is a fictional character from the Australian soap opera Neighbours, played by Moya O'Sullivan. She made her first appearance during the episode broadcast on 5 July 1994. She was introduced as the estranged mother of Cheryl Stark (Caroline Gillmer). The pair often argued and Marlene constantly interferes in other people's business, but O'Sullivan believed Marlene meant well. She also described her as enormously caring, but Cheryl struggles to forgive Marlene for leaving her and her father. As she settles in, Marlene opens a bric-a-brac store and is often up for a scam or a bet. She also has a brief romance with Colin Taylor (Frank Bren). The character was written out in mid-1997 and exited the serial on 14 October 1997, when she went on a three-month cruise and never returned. O'Sullivan reprised her role for the show's 20th anniversary episode, which was broadcast on 27 July 2005. Marlene revealed that she is still sailing the seas.

== Casting ==
O'Sullivan relocated from Sydney to Melbourne for filming. She admitted that she preferred Sydney and found that it rained a lot in Melbourne. O'Sullivan lived an hour's drive from the studio, which meant she had to get up very early. She revealed that sometimes she was called in at 6:15am to film and could often work 14 hours a day.

In August 1997, Jason Herbison of Inside Soap reported O'Sullivan was to leave Neighbours. A show spokesperson said "It's a real shame because Moya is one of the most popular members of the cast. The powers that be obviously feel her role has come to an end." Herbison thought O'Sullivan's departure had something to do with the return of Madge (Anne Charleston) and Harold Bishop (Ian Smith), who previously lived in Marlene's house. He later reported that O'Sullivan was sad to be written out of the show, but had settled back in Sydney. In April 2005, Kris Green of Digital Spy confirmed O'Sullivan would be reprising her role of Marlene to join the many ex-cast members returning for the Neighbours 20th anniversary special episode.

== Development ==
Shortly before she was introduced on-screen, Marlene purchases Number 24 and sends her grandson, Sam Kratz (Richard Grieve) to inspect the house, while hoping he will meet his cousins who are living in Ramsay Street. When Marlene eventually arrives in Erinsborough, she seeks a reconciliation with her daughter, Cheryl Stark (Caroline Gillmer), who she had left when she was eleven. Josephine Monroe, author of Neighbours: The First 10 Years, said Cheryl had "demonized her mother in her mind" and wanted nothing to do with her, while Victoria Ross of Inside Soap observed that there had never been any love lost between them. The pair argue over various matters from bringing up children to the best way of baking bread, until they forge a temporary truce. However, when Cheryl learns Marlene has enrolled her infant daughter Louise Carpenter (Tessa Taylor) in a local school, Ross said that "all hell breaks loose!" O'Sullivan thought Cheryl had a good point about her interfering character, saying that Marlene could be "a real bossy boots." She also believed Marlene meant well when she got involved in other people's lives, telling Ross: "She's an enormously caring woman and in times of trouble she's the best person to turn to. But Cheryl still blames Marlene for leaving her father even though Hector Kratz was a real womaniser!"

Ross noted that Cheryl appeared to be the only person in Erinsborough who had not been charmed by her mother. She hoped that Cheryl would come to her senses before Marlene decided to leave, which would devastate her grandchildren Brett Stark (Brett Blewitt) and Danni Stark (Eliza Szonert). O'Sullivan commented that Marlene's departure would be a "big blow" for fans of the character on and off-screen, adding "She's a good grandmother and I do love the way kids respond to her. I wouldn't say I've become the nation's granny but I do get great feedback from lots of youngsters." As she gets to know Marlene a little better, Cheryl admits she quite likes her, although she struggles to bring herself to call her "mum". Marlene sells cosmetics, before opening a bric-a-brac store. She likes to invent a background story for all the items that pass through the "wacky" shop. Monroe described Marlene as a bit scatty and always on for a scam or a bet.

In 1996, writers had Marlene embark on a whirlwind romance with Colin Taylor (Frank Bren). Shortly after Colin returns to Erinsborough, he sets out to win Marlene's heart. When asked what "lively" Marlene could possibly have in common with Colin, O'Sullivan told a writer for Inside Soap: "They just hit it off in a big way. There's no big passion but they do have similar interests. Although she's surrounded by a loving family, it's nice for her to have someone of her own vintage around to care for her." The pair grow closer and O'Sullivan said they have a happy bond and it is definitely love between them. Dave Lanning of The People was critical of the storyline, saying the Neighbours plotliners must have been on magic mushrooms when they decided to pair Marlene with the "terminally boring" Colin.

== Storylines ==
Marlene arrives in Ramsay Street after purchasing Number 24 from Madge Bishop and she is joined by her grandson, Sam. It soon becomes apparent Marlene had purchased the house to be nearer to her estranged daughter, Cheryl, who she had walked out on in her childhood. Cheryl refuses to have anything to do with Marlene at first, but she softens after Marlene knits booties for the baby Cheryl is expecting.

Marlene settles into the area and befriends fellow pensioner Helen Daniels (Anne Haddy) and later runs her own bric-a-brac shop and plays surrogate mother to teenage runaway Bianca Zanotti (Anna Gagliardi). After Bianca's departure Marlene later takes in lodgers Annalise Hartman (Kimberley Davies) and Cody Willis (Peta Brady). After Cheryl's relationship with Lou Carpenter (Tom Oliver) breaks down, Cheryl, her daughter Louise and son Darren Stark (Todd MacDonald) move into Number 24 with her. Cheryl is later killed in a car accident, leaving the family devastated and Marlene is left to keep the peace between Lou and Darren. When Madge returns to Erinsborough to reconcile with her husband, Harold, Marlene moves in next door with Lou and rents the house to the Bishops.

Marlene takes a job working for Karl Kennedy (Alan Fletcher) and finds herself competing with Sarah Beaumont (Nicola Charles) for the title of Receptionist of the Year. She later leaves for a three-month cruise, but is not seen for eight years until she appears in Annalise's documentary about Ramsay Street, where she reveals she is still sailing the seas.

== Reception ==
A writer for the BBC's Neighbours website stated that Marlene's most notable moment was "Reuniting with Cheryl after so long." To celebrate the 20th anniversary of the soap, the BBC Online readers were asked to nominate their twenty favourite obscure characters. Marlene came in tenth place and the readers commented "Marlene Kratz, the mother of Lou Carpenter's late wife Cheryl Stark. Reason? For heading off on a three-month cruise in the mid-1990s, never to be seen or spoken of again." A columnist for Inside Soap branded Marlene "the grooviest granny in Erinsborough, who throws herself into any worthy cause, and opens her house to every passing waif and stray." John Millar from the Daily Record called the character an "ageing cabbage patch doll".

To celebrate Neighbours' 25th anniversary, British satellite broadcasting company Sky, included Marlene in their list of twenty-five characters who were the most memorable in the serial's history. A writer for Sky said "Considering Marlene was originally introduced in the rather serious business of being estranged for several decades from daughter Cheryl, she made a name for herself with comic storylines, largely revolving around getting into trouble with grandchildren Sam, Brett and Dannii. With her nineties shirts and love of Elvis Presley, Marlene spent three years getting into old lady scrapes before leaving on a three-month cruise. That was in 1997, so she's due back any day now."

Alex Fletcher from Digital Spy made Marlene their "DS Icon" on 7 January 2011, calling her a legendary and special character. Of Marlene and her personality, Fletcher commented "Spending only three years on Ramsay Street, Marlene made an emotional impact on viewers who loved her wheeler dealer lifestyle (selling VCRs, running a bric-a-brac shop), constant scrapes and bantering with daughter Cheryl and son-in-law Lou Carpenter. Marlene, played by the delightful Moya O'Sullivan, was a crucial cog in the Golden Age of Neighbours in the '90s." Fletcher believed that the character's unusual exit and how she did not return from her cruise only added to the mystery surrounding her. The reporter added "The only glimpse we got of Marlene was a short clip in the 2005 anniversary show, where she was shown still sailing the seas. While that finally put to rest the rumours that Lou and Harold had bumped her off, her seemingly never-ending cruise still seems highly curious. Many suspect that she may have shacked up with a cheeky cabin boy, but we can't confirm that detail."
