= Cody Willis =

Fictional character from Neighbours

- Neighbours character
- Peta Brady as Cody (1996)
- Portrayed by: Amelia Frid (1989–1991); Peta Brady (1993–1996)
- Duration: 1989–1991, 1993–1996
- First appearance: 24 November 1989
- Last appearance: 29 March 1996
- Introduced by: Don Battye (1989); Alan Coleman (1993)
- Amelia Frid as Cody (1990)
In-universe information
- Occupation: High school student; University student; Receptionist
- Family: Willis
- Father: Doug Willis
- Mother: Pam Willis
- Brothers: Adam Willis; John Willis; Brad Willis
- Sisters: Gaby Willis
- Husband: Drew Grover (1992–1994)
- Grandfathers: Seamus Beresford
- Grandmothers: Moina Beresford
- Nephews: Zac Willis

Cody Willis is a fictional character from the Australian soap opera Neighbours, originally played by Amelia Frid. She made her first on-screen appearance on 24 November 1989. The character departed in 1991, but returned in 1993 with Peta Brady in the role. Cody was last seen on-screen on 29 March 1996, following her death.

== Casting ==
Amelia Frid successfully auditioned for Neighbours in 1989 and was cast in the role of Cody. Frid called the experience a "right time, right place thing", adding that "it was all kind of surreal".

== Development ==
=== Characterisation ===
Cody was one of the first members of the Willis family to arrive in Ramsay Street. She soon became Todd Landers' (Kristian Schmid) girlfriend. Frid told Dawn Bebe from BIG! that Cody is "flirty and does her best to chase boys – especially Todd". Frid was embarrassed by her character's actions because she was completely unlike Cody. Cody was initially described as being "studious" and a "high achiever." Her parents were very proud of her. Cody earned a scholarship to study in America and she "jumped at the chance" to leave Erinsborough. Upon her return, Cody was a "determined young woman" and she once wore a fake moustache, so she could play on the men's cricket team. Brady said believed that people liked her characters "down-to-earth qualities". She also said that viewers had told her that they were happy to see "someone who isn't scarily beautiful" on the show. A Sunday World columnist observed that "as well as sporting a more glamorous image, Cody is also a much more fun-loving young one."

=== Departure and reintroduction ===
Frid's departure occurred during a revamp of Neighbours following a decline in ratings. Network Ten's executive John Holmes planned to introduce new characters, including Rachel Blakely and Scott Michaelson as Cody's siblings Gaby Willis and Brad Willis. Ian Williams, who played Cody's eldest brother Adam Willis, was also due to depart. Frid said that there was a lot of interest in renewing her contract, yet she chose to leave to study for her VCE. Her Principal told her that the school could not support her if she wanted to continue with Neighbours and take her VCE. Frid made her on-screen departure on 30 July 1991, as Cody leaves for America on a student exchange trip.

The character was reintroduced during the episode broadcast on 1 December 1993. Frid was not asked to return and producers decided to recast the role. Peta Brady was a full-time student at Sydney University when she won the role of Cody. Brady said she was "delighted" to play Cody when Frid was not available. She understood that some viewers might find the changes to the character "odd", but she hoped that they would not take too long to accept her. Brady also commented "Cody's an interesting character and has a few surprises in store." Critics and viewers immediately noted the physical differences between Brady and Frid. Sue Malins of the Daily Mirror also observed that it was not just the character's looks that the producers had taken liberties with, as she calculated that Cody's age when she left meant that she should have been past school age, but Cody enrols in Erinsborough High upon her return. A spokesperson told Malin: "A certain amount of dramatic licence has been taken to bring her back into year 12 at the school." Cody's first day at the school causes "havoc" among the male students, who organise a competition to see who will date her first. However Cody swears off men, after revealing that her American boyfriend broke up with her to date her best friend. Malins said that a "heartbroken" Cody came home for a fresh start.

=== Relationships ===
When Cody returns from America she is a "changed person" and "clearly broken-hearted." The BBC said that Cody had gained a "broader outlook on life" due to her time away. Cody tries hard to establish her relationship with her family, but her "bizarre" mood swings alarm her parents. Doug (Terence Donovan) and Pam (Sue Jones) also find it hard to understand why Cody is steering clear of her "male admirers", Rick Alessi (Dan Falzon) and Michael Martin (Troy Beckwith). Michael falls for Cody as he believes that they are two of a kind. Inside Soap said "Both feel lonely and isolated after returning to their families after a long time away and initially they vow to stay just good friends." However, Michael's sister, Debbie (Marnie Reece-Wilmore), decides to play cupid to get them together. This does not sit well with Michael's stepmother Julie (Julie Mullins). When Rick first meets Cody, he thinks she is gorgeous and the girl for him. He tries to flirt with her at every opportunity, but Cody is determined to stay away from boys. She tells Debbie that she had her heart broken in America and that she is scared of getting hurt again. In her book, Neighbours: the first 10 years, Josephine Monroe said that Cody and Rick were "made for each other" because they shared the same sense of humour and they were ambitious.

It is later revealed that Cody had secretly married Drew Grover (Christopher Kirby) while she was in America. Kirby told Caron James from TV Week that he believed the marriage story was credible, despite accusations that it was far-fetched. Drew turns up in Ramsay Street and Cody is forced to explain that she returned home because Drew cheated on her. Of why Cody and Drew married, Kirby explained to Victoria Ross of Inside Soap "Drew married Cody so that he could transfer a family inheritance into her name and so avoid paying tax on it. She knew what she was getting into, but unfortunately she fell head over heels in love with him and was devastated when she found out that he was having an affair with her best friend." Cody's family are concerned when she does not send Drew back to America straight away and it looks like she wants to settle back into married life with him. However, Drew asks Cody for a divorce because he wants to be a politician and a mixed race marriage might ruin his political aspirations. Their marriage ends and Cody realises that she loves Rick. Brady said that she was not like Cody at all when it came to men, saying "Cody always seemed to need to have a man in tow."

=== Second departure ===
After four years in the role, Brady decided to quit Neighbours. She said that Cody had been "great fun to play", but it was time to move on. Upon learning that the character was to be killed-off, Brady admitted that she was relieved, as she could not sit and watch someone else in the role. She continued, "I was pleased when I heard she was going to die because I like to finish things clearly – and that was obviously going to be an end to everything." Brady found the filming of her last scenes "hard" and said was "just numb". She also said that it felt "kind of spooky" saying goodbye to her character, as she could sense "the feelings of everyone who'd known her in Ramsay Street." Cody is shot after a drugs bust in Ramsay Street goes wrong. She is hit by a stray bullet as police try to apprehend the drug dealers. The situation was described as being perhaps one of the most disturbing events to have ever occurred in Ramsay Street. Cody was left in a critical condition and she was taken to the hospital, where she underwent surgery. Cody's mother Pam returns to Erinsborough from Darwin to be by her daughter's bedside, but Cody later dies. Months before the storyline was due to air in the United Kingdom, the Dunblane massacre occurred and the BBC were urged not to show the scenes, which had been labelled "inappropriate and insensitive." Brady made her final appearance on 29 March 1996 as Cody's ghost appears to her friend Sam Kratz (Richard Grieve).

== Storylines ==
Cody is the youngest child born to Doug and Pam Willis. Cody is a sister to Adam, Brad and Gaby. Cody falls for Todd Landers, who is her classmate at Erinsborough High. When Todd's girlfriend, Melissa Jarrett (Jade Amenta), goes away to America, Cody decides to make a play for Todd. Cody tries to seduce Todd, but he remains committed to Melissa. Todd later kisses Cody, but he stays with Melissa. Cody then began dating Josh Anderson (Jeremy Angerson). Melissa and Josh begin to spend more time together studying and they fall for each other. Todd then breaks up with Melissa for Cody.

Cody's parents move into Ramsay Street and Todd tells Cody that he is being sent back to Adelaide. Cody begs Todd to stay, but he is forced to leave. However, Todd does not get on the bus to Adelaide and Cody hides him in her room. Pam finds Todd, but his uncle Jim Robinson (Alan Dale) allows him to stay with him. Pam finds condoms in Cody's bag and fears she is having sex with Todd. The condoms had been given to all of the students at the school during a sex education class. Cody is forbidden from seeing Todd and they decide to run away. Cody catches a bad fever and is forced to return home.

The Willises go away to a guest house in the bush for a weekend and Cody goes missing just as a bush fire breaks out. She is presumed dead, after the valley where she had gone to collect water is gutted by the fire. Cody turns up the next day suffering from smoke inhalation and carrying a cat she rescued. Dorothy Burke (Maggie Dence) puts Cody forward for a scholarship in America. Cody does not want to leave Todd, but they decide to split up. The later decide to have a long-distance relationship. While she is away, Cody writes a letter to Todd telling him that their relationship is over. Cody later marries Drew Grover. When she realises that Drew does not love her, Cody returns to Erinsborough.

Cody's family are happy to have her home. Cody becomes withdrawn and Pam introduces her to Debbie Martin. Cody falls for Rick Alessi, because he is different. However, their romance is cut short, when Rick leaves for Hong Kong. Cody later becomes friends with Debbie's brother, Michael and they spend a lot of time together. Rick returns to Ramsay Street and a rivalry breaks out between him and Michael. Cody and Michael begin dating and Michael puts pressure on Cody to have sex. They later decide to be friends instead. Cody is stunned when Drew arrives in Ramsay Street and tries to stop him revealing the truth about their marriage. The truth does come out and Doug and Pam are shocked. Drew and Cody agree to divorce and Drew goes home.

Cody and Rick eventually start a relationship after he escorts her to the deb ball. Cody moves in with Marlene Kratz (Moya O'Sullivan) after Doug and Pam move to Darwin. She later moves in with Debbie's family. Rick is offered a job in Darwin and he leaves, after he and Cody agree to try a long-distance relationship. Cody gets a job as a receptionist at Karl Kennedy's (Alan Fletcher) surgery and moves in with Mark Gottlieb (Bruce Samazan). Cody ends her relationship with Rick for Stonefish Rebecchi (Anthony Engelman). They later decide to be friends and Cody begins dating her college tutor, Adrian Ewart (Jeremy Kewley). When she finds out that he has a girlfriend, she ends the relationship. However, Adrian begins stalking Cody and she is forced to issue him with a restraining order.

Stonefish and Malcolm Kennedy (Benjamin McNair) buy a used car from a pair of drug dealers. The police realise that the dealers have hidden drugs in the car and arrive in Ramsay Street to try to catch the dealers. The police set up a base for their operation in Cody's house. The drug dealers arrive and a shootout breaks out between them and the police. A shot is fired through the window and it hits Cody in the stomach. Cody is then rushed to the hospital for surgery. Cody lies in a critical condition for a week and Pam arrives to visit her. Cody regains consciousness, but she suddenly goes into cardiac arrest. The doctors try to save her, but Cody dies. She later appears to Sam Kratz before a memorial service is held for her. Her body is then taken to Darwin to be buried.

== Reception ==
A writer for the BBC's Neighbours website said Cody's most notable moment was "Being shot and killed." During a feature on Neighbours, Anna Pickard of The Guardian tried to choose the characters she would be most starstruck by if she met them. She said "It would have to be the Willis family. All of them. Pam, Doug, Adam, Gaby, Brad and Cody". While played by Frid, Sue Malins of the Daily Mirror called Cody "one of Neighbours most tedious teenies". When she was caught up in the bus fire, Malins commented "She survives, however, and her brush with death makes her a very different person. Well, it's an ill wind..." When the episode in which a condom is found in Cody's bag aired in the UK, Malins' colleague Pauline Wallin thought it would lead to the serial's younger viewers asking embarrassing questions about contraception. A spokesperson for the BBC confirmed that there had been no plans to warn parents about the content of the episode beforehand. Bebe writing for BIG! branded Cody both "boy-crazy" and "boy-mad". Kate Langbroek of The Age called Cody was the "resident intellectual" and added "don't be fooled by that grunge exterior." When Cody's ghost appeared to Sam, a The Daily Telegraph critic quipped "The only one who hears her is Sam and he's been on the drink. But then a few drinks might help it all make sense. In 2020, Adam Beresford writing for HuffPost opined that Cody, Melissa, Todd and Josh formed one of the "show's best teen groups".
