= Michael Martin (Neighbours) =

Fictional character from Neighbours

- Neighbours character
- Troy Beckwith as Michael Martin (1992)
- Portrayed by: Samuel Hammington (1985); Troy Beckwith (1992–1998)
- Duration: 1985, 1992–1998
- First appearance: 8 October 1985
- Last appearance: 26 June 1998
- Introduced by: Reg Watson (1985); Don Battye (1992)
In-universe information
- Occupation: Student; Carpenter
- Father: Philip Martin
- Mother: Loretta Martin
- Stepmother: Julie Martin
- Sisters: Debbie Martin
- Half-sisters: Hannah Martin

Michael Martin is a fictional character from the Australian soap opera Neighbours, played by Troy Beckwith. He made his first screen appearance during the episode broadcast on 8 October 1985. The character was originally played by Samuel Hammington. Beckwith took over the role in 1992 and appeared on a regular basis until 1994, but continued to make guest appearances until 1998.

== Development ==
Beckwith previously played the recurring role of school bully Darren Wood in 1991, prior to securing the role of Michael.

At the start of 1994, Neighbours decided to push for "a younger, livelier look, with six regular characters under the age of 18" and Michael became part of the show's new "brat pack", along with his sister Debbie Martin (Marnie Reece-Wilmore), Cody Willis (Peta Brady), Rick Alessi (Dan Falzon), and newcomers Brett Stark (Brett Blewitt) and Danni Stark (Eliza Szonert).

Shortly after his return to Erinsborough, Michael began dating Cody Willis (Brady). Beckwith told an Inside Soap columnist, "Michael falls for Cody in a big way. But unbeknown to him, she really likes Rick Alessi (Dan Falzon)." Although Cody liked Michael, she did not want "a heavy" relationship and resisted his attempts to take things further. Beckwith explained that Michael was hurt when she refused to have sex with him, but he was unaware that she had been in a "disastrous" relationship before, so he thought he had done something to put her off. The Inside Soap columnist did not blame Cody for being worried about whether Michael would treat her right due to his "murky" past. Beckwith pointed out that the time Michael spent in the detention centre helped straighten him out and he had become "a bit of a goody-goody". Beckwith preferred it when his character was bad, as he felt Michael was more fun to play.

In an issue-based storyline, Michael goes through a HIV/AIDS scare. Believing he might be HIV positive, he confides in Cody, who encourages him to get tested. A writer for the Daily Mirror said the character "will wrestle with the devastating secret" for a few weeks. Cody persuades Michael to find his former girlfriend Chrissie (Adele Danielle), whom Michael met while living on the streets. Michael is "stunned" when Chrissie reveals that she is HIV positive, and he has to wait several weeks before the test results come back. Beckwith was thankful for the storyline, and said "Being the baddie is a real thrill. Michael used to be a real mongrel, which was great. So many actors never get any decent storylines and sit around drinking coffee. I've been lucky."

== Storylines ==
Michael is first seen, along with his sister, Debbie, when Julie Robinson arrives at their father Philip's neighbour's house to break the news of a car accident that kills their mother, Loretta. Julie helps look after the children and eventually marries Philip and they are heard from sparingly throughout the years.

Michael returns from boarding school several months after the family re-settle in Ramsay Street. He quickly creates mischief and begins targeting Julie and plays mind games with her out of resentment, blaming her for Loretta's death. Michael also resents his half-sister Hannah (Rebecca Ritters) and is unkind toward her. When Hannah and Beth Brennan (Natalie Imbruglia) are caught in a fire in an abandoned house behind Lassiter's, Michael is a suspected but is later cleared when it is revealed he had been in the arcade at the time of the fire.

Michael later descends into crime and is eventually arrested. While in the detention centre, he meets Darren Stark (Scott Major) and both boys immediately hate each other. When Rick Alessi, Debbie's ex-boyfriend, tells Michael about Darren dating and using Debbie, Michael is keen to break out and escapes the detention centre, dressed as a woman. When Michael and Rick arrive at the service station, they find Darren armed with a knife and Debbie in tow. Michael bursts in to save his sister, only to be shot by the cashier, who assumes Michael was in on the attempted robbery. Michael survives and Darren is arrested.

At Christmas 1993, Michael returns home for good, having changed his ways but Julie and Hannah are not keen on him being around. He decides to move into a youth hostel but is talked out of it at the last minute and Julie, Hannah and Michael agree to put the past behind them. As 1994 begins, Michael befriends the recently returned Cody Willis, who he begins dating and Darren's siblings, Brett (Brett Blewitt) and Danni (Eliza Szonert).

After Michael's relationship with Cody ends when he finds out that she is attracted to Rick, he begins dating Danni. When Danni and Michael are caught with needles by Pam Willis (Sue Jones) and Julie, the worst is assumed but everything is resolved when it is revealed Danni is diabetic. Helen Daniels (Anne Haddy), Julie's grandmother, begins seeing former resident Len Mangel (John Lee); Michael does a little investigating and figures out that Len is out to rip Helen off. When Michael and Danni's relationship becomes physical, it puts a strain on their parents and it is decided that one half of the couple will have to leave. Michael takes a place at the Brosnan Centre in Marree.

After learning of Julie's accident after falling from the tower during a Murder Mystery weekend, Michael returns to Erinsborough. When Julie dies in hospital and Philip is accused of pushing her, Michael stands by his father. Michael returns home the following year for Christmas and catches up with old friends. During this visit, Michael manages to put Malcolm Kennedy's (Benjamin McNair) nose out of joint, causing him to become paranoid that Michael has returned to win Danni back and also takes a dislike to Jen Handley (Alyce Platt), Philip's new girlfriend. When Helen dies in 1997, Michael drives through the night to make it home to support the family and attends the memorial service at Lassiter's lake. Before leaving, he suggests Debbie comes back to Maree with him, which upsets Hannah at first but something she later accepts.

Michael makes his final return to Ramsay Street in 1998, for Philip's wedding to Ruth Wilkinson (Ailsa Piper) and tries to cheer up Hannah, who is having trouble adjusting to the new blended family, which includes Ruth's children, Ben Atkins (Brett Cousins), Lance (Andrew Bibby) and Anne (Brooke Satchwell). Michael suggests keeping photos of Ruth up to make her feel welcome, while Hannah keeps photos of Julie in her room, just for the wedding day.

== Reception ==
Writing for The Guardian, Richard Arnold branded the character "sicko Micko" and said he "wreaks havoc" when he "turns up to bring an Amityville touch to the Robinson household". A Hull Daily Mail critic noted that Michael's arrival filled Julie "with foreboding – with good reason." Similarly, Tim Davey of the Bristol Evening Post dubbed the character a "sneaky, evil teenager" following his attempts to kill Julie. Reviewing his exit episode, Davey stated "And stand by for the departure of the evil Michael from Ramsay Street. It'll be a relief to see this chap disappear – but watch out for one dramatic parting gesture!"

Ausculture placed Michael at number ten on their Top Ten Aussie Soap Villains list. They said "Michael Martin was a troubled teen. He bullied his half-sister Hannah (fair enough, I reckon), tried to kill his stepmother Julie Martin (hang on, that sounds fair enough too!), forced Toby Mangel to help him win money on the horses, and nearly knocked up Danni Stark! In the scheme of Neighbours teenagers, this makes him the Charles Manson of Ramsay Street."

Heckler Spray included Michael in their list of "The Best Ever Mid-90s Neighbours Characters". Of Michael they said "Michael Martin was nothing short of pure evil, playing the angelic son on his return from boarding school, while simultaneously turning hated stepmum (and weird guilty pleasure) Julie into an alcoholic, and convincing everyone she had gone mad. Michael was one of Neighbours' few convincing bad guys, who probably arbitrarily converted to being good at a later date." Adam Beresford from HuffPost branded Michael the show's "demon child".

In a Time Out feature profiling "best soap opera moments", British playwright Robin French chose Michael terrorising Julie as the most memorable. He recalled that it was his "favourite storyline" and branded Michael a "teen villain" who had "frightening poise and unflinching nerve" as he tormented Julie. He added that it was clever because the audience hated Julie, so they "were perversely egging him on".
