= List of Neighbours characters introduced in 1994 =

Neighbours is an Australian television soap opera created by Reg Watson. It was first broadcast on 18 March 1985. The following is a list of characters that first appeared in the serial in 1994, by order of first appearance. Until 9 May, characters were introduced by the soap's executive producer, Alan Coleman. Thereafter, they were introduced by his successor, Stanley Walsh. The 10th season of Neighbours began airing from 24 January 1994. Frank Bren began appearing as Colin Taylor in same month. Bren also played Colin's twin brother Alf. March saw the arrivals of Len Mangel, Sally Pritchard and Stonefish Rebecchi. Katerina Torelli made her first appearance in April, followed by Andrew MacKenzie in May. Elliot Patterson and Sam Kratz were introduced in June and Sam's grandmother Marlene Kratz began appearing in July. That month also saw the births of Louise Carpenter and Zac Willis. Serendipity Gottlieb made her debut in August. Stonefish's brother Shane Rebecchi arrived in September. He was followed by the first two members of the Kennedy family: doctor Karl Kennedy and his youngest son Billy. Karl's wife Susan and their elder children Malcolm and Libby followed in October. November saw Bianca Zanotti and Ling Mai Chan make their debut appearances.

== Colin Taylor ==
Colin Taylor
- Neighbours character
- Portrayed by: Frank Bren
- Duration: 1994–1995
- First appearance: 27 January 1994
- Last appearance: 3 November 1995
- Introduced by: Alan Coleman
In-universe information
- Occupation: Interpreter; Newsagent assistant
- Brothers: Alf Taylor

Colin Taylor, played by Frank Bren, made his first appearance on 27 January 1994. The character was described as an "incurable chatterbox" and "irritating as hell" by a writer for Inside Soap. Writers later paired Colin with established character Marlene Kratz (Moya O'Sullivan). O'Sullivan said the pair "seem to hit it off in a big way" and that it was "definitely love". Marlene and Colin share similar interests and O'Sullivan thought it was nice that Marlene had someone of her own that cared for her.

Colin introduces himself to Philip (Ian Rawlings) and Julie Martin (Julie Mullins) when they arrive at their holiday bungalow in Queensland. The Martins find Colin friendly, but his tendency to ramble irritates them. Colin reappears several months later as Doug Willis's (Terence Donovan) roommate at the hospital. Colin takes a job at Philip's newsagency and competes against Karl Kennedy (Alan Fletcher) at the auction for Number 28 Ramsay Street but ultimately loses out. Colin makes several changes to the newsagency, and he forms a Barbershop Trio with Philip and Vikram Chatterji (Nigel Rodrigues). Colin moves into Number 30 with Mark Gottlieb (Bruce Samazan) and Cody Willis (Peta Brady). Colin's twin brother Alf (also Bren) comes to visit him. When Colin pursues a relationship with Marlene Kratz, he believes Alf is also trying to making advances towards her and they fight. Alf then admits that he is not interested in Marlene, as he is gay. Colin proposes to Marlene. They argue about what type of ceremony to have, as Marlene is Catholic and Colin wants a civil ceremony. Shortly after, Colin is offered a job as a translator by the curator of the Modern Ceramics exhibition, which is going on a world tour. Marlene ends their relationship, as she does not want to leave her family. Colin then leaves for Argentina, after his friends throw him a leaving party.

Colin received a nomination for Most Annoying Character at the 1996 Inside Soap Awards. Dave Lanning of The People was not a fan of the Colin/Marlene pairing, commenting that the writers must have been on magic mushrooms when they came up with the storyline. He stated, "Moonie Marlene, who had an invisible cat and disappearing garden gnomes, is being wooed by the terminally boring Colin Taylor, who always appeared in a straw boater originally; pioneered barber shop quartets, and is back from China – banging a gong and muttering in Mandarin. You honestly wouldn't script it." Matthew Clifton, writing for HecklerSpray, included the character in his feature on the "Best Ever Mid-90s Neighbours Characters". Clifton said, "Colin was pompous and irritating, a pastiche of a middle class bore who looked a lot like a paedophile. Colin actor Frank Bren also played his identical twin Alf, the more go-getting, handsome one, who turned out to be gay."

== Len Mangel ==
Len Mangel
- Neighbours character
- Portrayed by: John Lee
- First appearance: 16 March 1994
- Last appearance: 28 April 1994
- Introduced by: Alan Coleman
In-universe information
- Occupation: Con-artist
- Brothers: Cedric Mangel
- Wife: Nell Mangel (1946–1987)
- Sons: Joe Mangel
- Daughters: Amanda Harris
- Grandsons: Toby Mangel
- Granddaughters: Jane Harris; Sky Mangel

Leonard G. "Len" Mangel, played by John Lee, made his first appearance on 16 March 1994. Len is Nell Mangel's (Vivean Gray) former husband, who was often mentioned during the early years of the programme, but never seen. He returns to Erinsborough "out of the blue" and romances Helen Daniels (Anne Haddy), as he wants to steal her widow's pension. An Inside Soap columnist branded Len an "evil conman", and commented, "Poor old Helen – it looks as if she's headed for a fall – again!"

Len is the former husband of Nell Mangel and father of Amanda Harris (Briony Behets) and Joe Mangel (Mark Little). After Len's granddaughter Jane (Annie Jones) suspects Nell has killed him, it is eventually revealed that Len has left Nell for another woman. Len files for divorce and wants to sell Number 32 Ramsay Street and split the proceeds between them. Nell refuses and blackmails Len by threatening to follow him wherever he goes if she should lose the house.

Seven years later, Len returns to Erinsborough after Michael Martin (Troy Beckwith) and Doug Willis (Terence Donovan) find some old war medals and a trombone case with the initials L.G.M inscribed on it, while renovating an old house. Len reveals he used to live in the house and the case and medals belong to him. He lets Michael keep all the medals except for the Flying Cross. Len then meets up with his former neighbour Helen Daniels, who he has not seen in many years and they reminisce about old times. Len mentions he had left Nell because of her incessant nagging and moved in with Mary Pengelly who turned out to be just as bad and faked his death to get away from her and planned to reappear to scare her, but Mary had died before Len had the chance. He also mentions he has since reconciled with Joe but Amanda will not forgive him for leaving Nell. Helen is initially appalled at Len's justification for his actions but continues to see him, much to the chagrin of Julie (Julie Mullins), Helen's granddaughter.

Len attempts to con some money out of Helen by suggesting she invest in Outback Tours. Despite warnings from her family, Helen is undeterred. When Michael returns Len's jacket to an address on his driving license he meets Gwen Childs (Robyn Bissett), who warns him that Len is not to be trusted, as he conned her into putting her money into a joint account and emptied it. Gwen thinks Len may do the same to Helen. Michael warns Helen, who continues not to listen, so he and his sister, Debbie (Marnie Reece-Wilmore), set a trap for Len. When Len is caught, he tries to explain himself to Helen, and she sends him packing.

A writer for BBC Online, which hosted an official Neighbours website, said Len's most notable moment was "Trying to scam money out of Helen by trying to get her to invest in a dodgy business called Outback Tours." Len was also included in the BBC's list of twenty favourite obscure Neighbours characters to help celebrate the show's 20th anniversary. Len's off-screen presence and the reason why viewers did not get to see him were noted. In her book The Neighbours Programme Guide, Josephine Monroe commented "Poor old Len Mangel was so henpecked by his witch of a wife Nell that he never dared show his face in Ramsay Street!"

== Sally Pritchard ==
Sally Pritchard
- Neighbours character
- Portrayed by: Brenda Webb
- First appearance: 23 March 1994
- Last appearance: 12 May 1994
- Introduced by: Alan Coleman
In-universe information
- Occupation: Language teacher

Sally Pritchard, played by singer Brenda Webb, made her first appearance on 23 March 1994. Pritchard's casting was announced in January 1994. Brett Thomas of The Sun-Herald reported that she was initially contracted for six weeks. Webb liked the short duration, as she wanted to concentrate on her music career. She stated, "I don't think I'd like to work any longer than six months on a soapie because I feel I'd get stale doing the one character; plus I want to move on to bigger and better things." Sally was introduced as Erinsborough High's new Japanese language teacher, and a friend of Gaby Willis (Rachel Blakely). Sally's student Rick Alessi (Dan Falzon) develops a crush on her, and they soon begin a romantic relationship.

Sally's friend Gaby Willis helps her get a job teaching Japanese at Erinsborough High. Gaby also introduces Sally to Rick Alessi, a student at the school. He develops a crush on Sally and decides to take Japanese as an extra subject. Sally develops feelings for Rick, but assures him that nothing can happen as she is his teacher. Rick makes the decision to leave school and becomes a bar man at The Waterhole. He uses his salary to buy an engagement ring and proposes to Sally. She tells him it is too soon, but agrees to think about it. Sally talks to Gaby and her flatmate John Muir (Benjamin Grant) about Rick's proposal, and John advises her to break up with Rick. Sally later tells Gaby that she is scared at what Rick might do next, as he is not behaving very rationally. Sally asks Gaby to let Rick down gently on her behalf. John suggests that they pretend to be a couple to put Rick off. Sally accepts a job in Japan and before she leaves, she tells Rick that she cannot marry him, as she does not feel the same way as he does.

== Stonefish Rebecchi ==
Kevin "Stonefish" Rebecchi, played by Anthony Engelman, made his first appearance on 31 March 1994. The character was introduced after a TV Week reporter revealed the show would be getting "a younger, livelier look" with some new characters under the age of eighteen. Engelman told an Inside Soap columnist that his first script said his character got his nickname because he looked like a stonefish. Another writer for the publication observed that Stonefish was happy when he was causing a stir in the classroom, and that he was likely to be involved wherever there was trouble. Stonefish arrives on Ramsay Street after hearing that Brett Stark (Brett Blewitt) is dating his girlfriend Sassy Patterson-Smythe (Defah Dattner). Engelman said he had a lot in common with his character, as he had a tough time at school too and did not have much luck with girls.

== Katerina Torelli ==
Katerina Torelli
- Neighbours character
- Portrayed by: Josephine Mitchell
- First appearance: 18 April 1994
- Last appearance: 24 May 1994
- Introduced by: Alan Coleman
In-universe information
- Occupation: Charity fundraiser

Katerina "Katy" Torelli, played by Josephine Mitchell, made her first appearance on 18 April 1994. Mitchell was initially contracted for an eight-week guest stint. Mitchell was pleased to join another soap opera, having previously made appearances in A Country Practice and E Street. She also liked that Katerina was "such a positive character". Katerina has been disabled since birth and uses a wheelchair. Mitchell admitted that she found it hard acting in a wheelchair, and had to make it look as if she really was paralysed. During her research for the role, Mitchell turned to the Australian Paraquad Society for help. The actress thought the introduction of a disabled character was "just what the soap needs" and hoped it would get people talking about the issues raised. Katerina was introduced as a potential love interest for Mark Gottlieb (Bruce Samazan) and rival for Annalise Hartman (Kimberley Davies). Mitchell said Katerina thinks Mark is "very cute" and goes out of her way to make Annalise jealous. Kevin Sadlier of The Sydney Morning Herald reviewed Mitchell's first episode as Katerina as part of the paper's "Television This Week" feature. Sadlier wrote "Katerina first appears as a mystery woman waving to Mark Gottlieb from a passing car as if they are old friends, causing pangs of jealousy in Annalise. Actually they really are old friends – from E Street!"

When Katerina sees Mark Gottlieb out driving with Annalise Hartman, she immediately develops a crush on him. She starts phoning him using the alias "KT", causing Annalise to become jealous. Mark learns KT is actually Katerina, who explains that she is impressed with his fundraising for the Paralympics and wants to work with him. Katerina develops a crush on Mark, and starts dedicating songs to him on the radio. Mark warns her that he will not cheat on Annalise. After a night out with Mark's friends, Katerina makes a suggestive comment to Mark, who tells her again that he loves Annalise. But when Annalise goes away, Mark kisses Katerina. She tells Annalise that she and Mark are in love. Mark confronts Katerina, who insists that she is destined to be with him. Annalise and Mark realise they need to get away from Katerina's obsessive behaviour, so they leave for his parents' farm.

== Andrew MacKenzie ==
Andrew MacKenzie
- Neighbours character
- Portrayed by: John Morris
- First appearance: 9 May 1994
- Last appearance: 11 July 1994
- Introduced by: Alan Coleman
In-universe information
- Occupation: Council recreation officer

Andrew "Macca" MacKenzie, played by John Morris, made his first appearance on 9 May 1994. The character and Morris's casting details were publicised in the June 1994 issue of TV Soap, which was published shortly before his first appearance. Macca was the first gay character to be introduced to Neighbours. Morris felt it was a "bonus" for him to play Macca, explaining "It gave me exposure because he's a controversial character. I've never played a gay part in ten years as an actor, but let's face it, gay people are people. You don't try to be a gay person – put on a funny voice or wear a dress, you just are that person." Morris partly modelled the character on a friend who was gay and worked as a builder in Australia. He said that his friend was "built like a tank" and most people would assume he was straight.

Macca is a council recreation officer and Doug Willis's (Terence Donovan) new boss. He is open and happy about his sexuality, though he is used to girls having crushes on him. Teenager Debbie Martin (Marnie Reece-Wilmore) falls for him after taking his photograph, forcing Macca to tell her he is gay. Morris was disappointed that the scriptwriters did not give Macca a love interest, saying "There's never any reference made to a man in Macca's life." He thought they should have gone further with his character's storyline, which he would not have minded playing out. Morris admitted that Macca's exit after 12 weeks came as a surprise, but having also appeared in Home and Away, he had no desire to stay in soaps long-term and wanted to continue working in television and theatre productions.

Andrew visits the site of Kia-Ora, an old house which is being renovated by Doug Willis. He finds Lou Carpenter (Tom Oliver) brewing beer inside and asks if Doug is about. Lou directs him Doug's way, where Andrew introduces himself as a recreation officer from the council and Doug's supervisor on the project. He explains that the place should be done in six months, as the council want to open it as a museum. He also says that Lou needs to get his brewery off the premises as it is council property. While Debbie Martin is taking photographs at Kia-Ora for a school assignment, she sees Andrew gardening and takes his photo. She tells Doug's daughter Cody Willis (Peta Brady) about how attractive Macca is, so Cody visits the site to see him for herself. Andrew interrupts Cody and Doug to ask about a wall that Doug knocked down. He asks for it to be put back as it is part of the original design, leading Cody to call him an arrogant pig. She asks him to show her father more respect. Debbie later returns to the site to ask Andrew if Cody is there. Andrew recognises her school uniform and tells her that the council have put him in charge of the centenary celebrations and he is going around the local schools to drum up some fundraising, so if she has any good ideas to let him know. Andrew apologises to Doug about the wall and compliments the work he has done. He asks whether the homebrew is ready to drink, but Doug says no, so they decide to go to the local pub instead and Andrew tells Doug to call him "Macca".

Debbie later tells Macca about her debutante ball idea for Erinsborough's centenary celebrations, which Macca says is fantastic. Debbie asks if he likes dancing and invites him to a Hawaiian luau event at The Waterhole that evening. Macca attends the luau and Andrew encourages Debbie and Cody to join him in the conga. Macca allows Doug and Lou to store their homebrew at Kia-Ora and even becomes involved in the brewing operation. Macca works with Debbie organising the debutante ball and her crush on him intensifies. He tries to put her off, but she tells him that he is the only one who understands her. Cody warns Macca about Debbie's infatuation with him, and Macca tells her that he does not know what else he can do without hurting Debbie. He suggests resigning from the ball committee, so he will not have to go to the school, but Cody says he cannot avoid Debbie forever. She also berates him for storing Doug and Lou's illicit alcohol. Macca rejects Debbie's romantic advances and eventually tells her he is gay. Debbie struggles with Macca's rejection and develops an eating disorder. At the Deb ball, Macca apologises for not telling Debbie the truth sooner and he tells her that he never meant to hurt her, which she accepts. Doug, Lou and Macca make a deal to sell their homebrew at The Waterhole. Macca tells Rick Alessi (Dan Falzon) that it is only for customers who know about it. Megan Levy (Michelle Twigden) comes to Doug's house wanting to buy some of the homebrew and he, Lou and Macca take her to Kia-Ora to sample some. Rick realises that Megan is an undercover police officer and tells Cody, who goes to Kia-Ora and stops her father from selling the alcohol to Megan.

== Drew Grover ==
Drew Grover, played by Christopher Kirby, made his first appearance on 9 June 1994. Kirby's casting was announced by Caron James from TV Week. An American citizen, Kirby was jobbing actor in Australia when he received the guest role. Drew was introduced as the secret husband of Cody Willis (Peta Brady), whom she married during her time as an exchange student in the United States. Kirby told James that he believed the marriage story was credible, despite accusations that it was far-fetched. Drew's introduction into the series sees him arrive in Erinsborough. Cody reveals that Drew had slept with her friend causing her to return home. Kirby told Victoria Ross of Inside Soap that Drew married Cody so he could avoid paying tax on his family inheritance by transferring it into her name. He added that Cody "knew what she was getting into, but unfortunately she fell head over heels in love with him and was devastated when she found out that he was having an affair with her best friend." Cody's family are perturbed because Drew does not return the United States immediately. Drew soon requests a divorce because he believes a mixed race marriage might ruin his aspirations of a career in politics. He departed on 22 June 1994.

== Elliot Patterson ==
Elliot Patterson
- Neighbours character
- Portrayed by: Jon Concannon
- Duration: 1994–1995
- First appearance: 13 June 1994
- Last appearance: 4 January 1995
- Introduced by: Alan Coleman
In-universe information
- Occupation: Publisher

Elliot Patterson, played by Jon Concannon, made his first appearance on 13 June 1994. Concannon said the role was fun and he liked that it was a couple of days work a week, which was a change from his full time role as Tom Newman in A Country Practice. Elliot is introduced as "a small-time publisher", who is contacted by Dave Gottlieb (Ivar Kants) to read Annalise Hartman's (Kimberley Davies) poetry with a view to publishing it. Concannon described his character as "a real prat! But he's a worthy chap who uses long words as a bit of a barrier. He confuses people and has them scurrying to the dictionary... including me!" Concannon told Monique Dykstra of TV Soap that the poetry is "inoffensive but it's potent" and it is enough to make Elliot want more of Annalise. Elliot continues to appear into the 1995 season, as Annalise turns to him for comfort after she is jilted at the altar. Elliot "strongly resists her advances" and tries to help her through her problems, advising that she should spend some time alone and not throw herself into another man's arms.

After Mark Gottlieb's (Bruce Samazan) father Dave read some of Annalise Hartman's poems, he is impressed enough to contact Elliot, who comes to Erinsborough to meet Annalise. Elliot likes Annalise's poems enough to suggest that they could be published in a small anthology. Elliot and Annalise spend a lot of time together working on the anthology and become good friends, which makes Mark jealous. When Annalise's anthology is due to be published in England, Elliot arranges for her to go on a book tour there. After she gets engaged to Mark, Annalise asks Elliot to give her away at her wedding. When the ceremony is called off, Elliot invites Annalise to a poetry festival in Adelaide, so she can get away from Erinsborough for a few a days.

== Sam Kratz ==
Sam Kratz, played by Richard Grieve, made his first appearance on 13 June 1994. Neighbours was Grieve's first major television role and he relocated from his native Sydney to Melbourne, where the studio is located. Of being cast in a soap, he said "I'm thrilled with the way things have gone. I was very nervous when I first started because it was a long-running job but it's turned out well." Sam is sent to Ramsay Street by his grandmother, Marlene (Moya O'Sullivan), to check out the house she has purchased. While he initially gets off to a rough start, Sam soon becomes a popular Ramsay Street resident. Grieve wanted to be more like his character. He said that he was more of a worrier than Sam, who he described as "friendly and laid-back". For his portrayal of Sam, Grieve earned a nomination for Most Popular Newcomer at the 1st National Television Awards in 1995.

== Marlene Kratz ==
Marlene Kratz, played by Moya O'Sullivan, made her first appearance on 5 July 1994. She was introduced as the grandmother of Sam Kratz (Richard Grieve) and the estranged mother of Cheryl Stark (Caroline Gillmer). Josephine Monroe, author of Neighbours: the first 10 years, said Cheryl had "demonized her mother in her mind" and wanted nothing to do with her. Monroe described her as a bit scatty and always ready for a scam or a bet. Marlene also became a love interest for Colin Taylor (Frank Bren). A columnist for Inside Soap branded Marlene "the grooviest granny in Erinsborough, who throws herself into any worthy cause, and opens her house to every passing waif and stray." Alex Fletcher from Digital Spy made Marlene their "DS Icon" in January 2011. Fletcher stated that Marlene was "a crucial cog in the Golden Age of Neighbours in the '90s."

== Louise Carpenter ==
Shannon Louise "Lolly" Allen (also Carpenter) made her first appearance on 25 July 1994. Louise was originally played by Tessa Taylor from her on-screen birth, with Jiordan Tolli taking over the role a few months later. Cheryl Stark (Caroline Gillmer) gives birth to Louise on the same day as Gaby Willis (Rachel Blakely) gives birth to her son Zac (Jay Callahan). Louise came to be more commonly known as "Lolly". She was presumed to be Lou Carpenter's (Tom Oliver) daughter, until her biological father John Allen (Adrian Mulraney) got in contact, after Cheryl's death. Tolli departed the cast in 2001. The character was reintroduced in 2006, with Adelaide Kane taking over the role, after winning the Dolly "Neighbours Next Big Stars" competition. For her portrayal of Lolly, Kane was nominated for the Logie Award for Most Popular New Female Talent in 2008.

== Zac Willis ==
Zac Willis
- Neighbours character
- Portrayed by: Jay Callahan (1994); Alex Kaan (2025)
- Duration: 1994, 2025
- First appearance: 25 July 1994
- Last appearance: 11 December 2025
- Introduced by: Stanley Walsh (1994); Jason Herbison (2025)
In-universe information
- Other names: Shannon Zachary Willis
- Family: Willis
- Father: Jack Flynn
- Mother: Gaby Willis
- Grandfathers: Doug Willis
- Grandmothers: Pam Willis; Edwina Flynn
- Uncles: Adam Willis; Brad Willis
- Aunts: Cody Willis; Terese Willis (in-law)
- Other relatives: Moina Beresford

Zachary "Zac" Willis, played by Jay Callahan, made his first appearance on 25 July 1994. Zac is born to Gaby Willis (Rachel Blakely) who had become pregnant after a brief relationship with her flying instructor, Jack Flynn (Mark Pennell). On the same day as Zac's birth, Cheryl Stark (Caroline Gillmer) gives birth to her daughter. Gaby gives birth to a healthy baby boy, while Cheryl gives birth to a daughter who is premature. Gaby names her son Shannon, but Cheryl also uses the name for her daughter. While registering the birth, Gaby's father Doug Willis (Terence Donovan) names his grandson Zachary, after his grandfather. Gaby is not happy, but realises she likes the shortened version of the name, Zac. Jack returns and says he wants to be a part of his son's life. When Gaby gets a job in Darwin, Jack decides to move there with her and Zac. Shortly before they leave, the Willis family hold a naming ceremony at Number 28 and Gaby plants a tree for Zac.

Blakely said working with a two-week old baby had put her off having children for a few years. She also found working with a young baby to be a challenge, saying "We're only allowed to have the baby on set with the lights up for 30 seconds at a time. Then the lights automatically go down. So everything has to be done in chops and changes. It's hard to pick up emotionally where you left off." However, Blakely also said that Callahan had been "a dream" to work with. Blakely thought motherhood would be an eye opener for Gaby, saying that "she thinks she can juggle work and home life and the baby will look after himself. She's going to get a real shock when she realises how difficult it's going to be to bring up a child." Both Gaby and Zac departed the serial in 1994, after Blakely quit the show.

The character was reintroduced during the episode broadcast on 23 September 2025, with Alex Kaan taking over the role. Zac is a love interest for Colton Keys (Jakob Ambrose). The pair meet at the Back Lane Bar, where they share a kiss. Zac later moves in with his uncle Brad Willis's former wife Terese Willis (Rebekah Elmaloglou) on Ramsay Street along with her partner Paul Robinson and his daughter Elle, whom Zac befriends. It is revealed that Zac has transferred to Lassiter's Erinsborough from their Darwin hotel, and is being blackmailed because of a video which showed him having sex with a tennis coach in the Darwin hotel's elevator.

== Serendipity Gottlieb ==
Serendipity "Ren" Gottlieb, played by Raelee Hill, made her first appearance on 25 August 1994. She was among several new characters under the age of eighteen to be introduced after a TV Week reporter revealed the show would be getting "a younger, livelier look". The show's casting director Jan Russ noticed Hill in a cafe, while she was on a break from filming Blue Heelers, and asked her to audition for the role. Serendipity is the younger sister of Stephen (Lochie Daddo) and Mark Gottlieb (Bruce Samazan). Unlike her brothers, she enjoyed living in the hippy communes with her parents when she was a child and retained her beliefs. She is described as "one of life's free spirits" and is ruled by her heart rather than her head. Serendipity was less conservative than the other Ramsay Street residents and she "brought a breath of fresh air" into Mark's life.

== Shane Rebecchi ==
Shane Rebecchi, played by Greg O'Meara, made his first appearance on 8 September 1994. Shane is the elder brother of Stonefish (Anthony Engelman) and Toadfish Rebecchi (Ryan Moloney). The character departed in 1995, but was reintroduced to the regular cast in 2017, with Nicholas Coghlan taking over the role. Producers created a family for Shane and he returns to Erinsborough with his wife Dipi Rebecchi (Sharon Johal), daughters Yashvi Rebecchi (Olivia Junkeer) and Kirsha Rebecchi (Vani Dhir), and sister-in-law Mishti Sharma (Scarlet Vas). Executive producer Jason Herbison commented, "Shane Rebecchi is one of the great untapped characters from Neighbours history. I'm delighted to welcome him back to Ramsay Street along with his beautiful wife, two children and sister-in-law. It's a great new chapter of the Rebecchi family." Coghlan said that Shane comes to support Toadie during his "time of need", following his marriage breakdown. Of how Shane has changed in twenty years, the actor explained "He's no longer the loose cannon he once was – Shane believes in family above all else, and would do anything for his loved ones."

== Karl Kennedy ==
Karl Kennedy, played by Alan Fletcher, made his first appearance on 20 September 1994. The character and his family were created by the storyliners, who wanted to bring the show back to its roots, as most of the houses on Ramsay Street were filled with misfits and distant relatives. Karl was introduced as a General Practitioner, which gave him immediate links with the other characters. Alan Fletcher previously appeared in the show as mechanic Greg Cooper for three weeks in 1987. When the role of Karl became available, Fletcher auditioned in the same way as he had for Greg. Fletcher admitted that when he joined the show again he thought he would only be there for a year. Karl initially ran his own surgery in the Lassiter's Complex. He and his wife Susan (Jackie Woodburne) were childhood sweethearts. Fletcher won Best Daytime Star at the 2016 Inside Soap Awards.

== Billy Kennedy ==
Billy Kennedy, played by Jesse Spencer, made his first appearance on 27 September 1994. The character was introduced along with his mother, father and two older siblings by the show's storyliners, who wanted to take the show back to its roots, as it seemed that all the houses on Ramsay Street were populated with misfits and distant relatives. Spencer originally auditioned for the role of Brett Stark, but he was told that he was too young. The following year, he successfully auditioned for the role of Billy. Billy was described as being "sensitive" and "not as academically gifted as sister Libby" by Tony Johnston author of Neighbours: 20 years of Ramsay Street. Billy often gets into trouble with his best friend Toadfish Rebecchi (Ryan Moloney). For his portrayal of Billy, Spencer received nominations for the Logie Award for Most Popular Actor in 1998 and 1999.

== Malcolm Kennedy ==
Malcolm Kennedy, played by Benjamin McNair, made his first appearance on 3 October 1994. The character was introduced along with his parents and two younger siblings by storyliners, who wanted a "solid" family, as they felt that the houses on Ramsay Street were populated with misfits and distant relatives. After being cast as Malcolm, McNair relocated from his home in Sydney to Melbourne, where the show is filmed. He admitted that he had never watched Neighbours before joining the cast. Malcolm is the eldest of the Kennedy siblings. He is an athlete, and enjoys being in charge. He quickly gets involved in Ramsay Street "shenanigans". Shortly after his arrival, producers plotted a Romeo and Juliet style romance between Malcolm and Danni Stark (Eliza Szonert). Caroline Milburn of The Age branded him a "larrikin."

== Susan Kennedy ==
Susan Kennedy, played by Jackie Woodburne, made her first appearance on 3 October 1994. The character was introduced along with her husband and three teenage children by storyliners in an effort to bring the show back to its roots, as it seemed that all the houses on Ramsay Street were populated with misfits and distant relatives. Actress Ailsa Piper was initially considered for the role of Susan, before she was cast as Ruth Wilkinson. Woodburne received the role, and later revealed that she only intended to play the part for twelve months, but she soon fell in love with the show. Susan was given a teaching job at the local high school, giving her close links with the other characters. On her arrival, Susan was described as being good natured and more open-minded than her husband Karl Kennedy (Alan Fletcher).

== Libby Kennedy ==
Libby Kennedy, played by Kym Valentine, made her first appearance on 3 October 1994. The character was introduced along with her parents and two brothers by storyliners, who wanted to bring the show back to its roots when it seemed that all the houses on Ramsay Street were populated with misfits and distant relatives. After being cast as Libby, Valentine relocated from Sydney to Melbourne, where the studios are located, when she was 17 years old. Josephine Monroe, author of Neighbours; The First 10 Years, described Libby as an opinionated girl, who is willing to make a stand on "any and every issue." She is a communist and her political views often frustrate her father, Karl Kennedy (Alan Fletcher). Valentine enjoyed playing Libby's humorous and quirky personality traits. Libby was voted viewer's third favourite character in a 2002 poll run by Newsround.

== Bianca Zanotti ==
Bianca Zanotti
- Neighbours character
- Portrayed by: Annie Gagliardi
- Duration: 1994–1995
- First appearance: 11 November 1994
- Last appearance: 2 June 1995
- Introduced by: Stanley Walsh
In-universe information
- Occupation: Bric-a-brac shop assistant
- Mother: Claudia Marcusani

Bianca Zanotti, played by Annie Gagliardi, made her first appearance on 11 November 1994. Bianca was introduced as a teen runaway, who is found sleeping rough in Marlene Kratz's (Moya O'Sullivan) bric-a-brac shop. She befriends Marlene and her nephew Sam Kratz (Richard Grieve), and she tells them that she is "an ex-offender who is trying to go straight". When Bianca says that she cannot find anywhere to live or work, Sam allows her to stay at the shop. Gagliardi found playing a teen runaway made her a "cult figure" among young street children in St Kilda, who often recognised her and spoke to her as if she was one of them.

When Bianca and Marlene find some jewels among some of the stock in the shop, Bianca takes them to be valued and is accused of being in possession of stolen goods. Gagliardi told Inside Soap's Victoria Ross that her character would have a tough time proving her innocence, explaining "Everyone seems to turn against her, especially Cheryl who thinks that Bianca is real big trouble. This new run-in with the police makes her realise how difficult it will be to prove to people that her tearaway days are behind her." Bianca is also concerned that the police will not believe her because she has spent time in a detention centre. Although Marlene and Sam stand by her, Bianca decides to run away. Gagliardi said Bianca "feels terrible" about leaving the only people who have ever had faith in her, but she would not be gone for long. Of Bianca's time in the show, David Banks of The People observed, "Call her the tiddler who got away if you like, but Bianca's departure set some kind of record for a woman from Neighbours. No sex, no seductions, no real romance – just a solitary kiss from Brett Stark makes her the first nubile maid to escape from Ramsay Street without so much as a grope to remember the boys by."

After she is discovered sleeping in the bric-a-brac shop by Sam Kratz and Serendipity Gottlieb (Raelee Hill), Bianca tells them that she was thrown out of her house by her stepfather. She also tells them that she served time in a detention centre after she stole a car with some friends. Bianca is initially wary of Sam, and she reveals that she has been harassed by guys in the past. Sam asks Bianca to help him out with his handyman business. Sam's grandmother Marlene takes pity on Bianca, and invites her to move in with her. Bianca befriends Malcolm Kennedy (Benjamin McNair). When he tries to make advances towards her during a date, she punches him and he invents a story that he fended off muggers that attacked them. An incensed Bianca tells the truth, which humiliates Malcolm. Bianca becomes close with Brett Stark (Brett Blewitt) who helps her fill out an application for college. When Bianca's mother, Claudia Marcusani (Helen Trenos) reappears in her life, things are initially frosty between them, but Bianca decides to give her mother another chance and move back home with her. Before she leaves, Bianca gives Brett a kiss and a passionflower, asking him to keep it alive for her.

== Ling Mai Chan ==
Ling Mai Chan
- Neighbours character
- Portrayed by: Khym Lam
- Duration: 1994–1995
- First appearance: 23 November 1994
- Last appearance: 27 January 1995
- Introduced by: Stanley Walsh
In-universe information
- Other names: Mai Ling Chan
- Occupation: University lecturer Charity worker
- Father: Lou Carpenter
- Mother: Su Chan
- Half-brothers: Guy Carpenter
- Half-sisters: Lauren Carpenter

Ling Mai Chan, played by Khym Lam, made her first appearance on 23 November 1994. Ling Mai is Lou Carpenter's (Tom Oliver) daughter. Oliver told the show's producers that he believed Lou was old enough to have been conscripted for the Vietnam War and could have fathered a child over there. However, a similar storyline had already been done with Jim Robinson (Alan Dale), so the producers suggested something else instead. Lou learns he fathered a daughter after a brief relationship when he was twenty-one. An Inside Soap columnist observed, "the fruit of Lou's affair was a beautiful daughter Mai Ling who has now grown up to be a sophisticated university tutor." Lou is surprised when Ling Mai gets in contact and he arranges to meet her in secret, which leads his partner Cheryl Stark (Caroline Gillmer) to think he is having an affair. After a month, Ling Mai makes "shock announcement" that she is returning home, after her partner proposes. Lou is forced to say "a miserable farewell" to his daughter, leaving Cheryl to console him. The character was referenced in 2013, when Lou is persuaded to get back in contact with her. After Lou sends Ling Mai an email, she asks him to visit her in Cambodia. The storyline was inspired by Oliver's real life trip to the country.

Lou Carpenter receives a letter from Ling Mai informing him that she is his daughter, and wants to meet him. Lou initially keeps Ling Mai a secret from his partner Cheryl, who follows him one day and sees him meeting with Ling Mai. Cheryl assumes Lou is having an affair with Ling Mai, until Lou tells her that Ling Mai is his daughter. Cheryl invites Ling Mai to dinner, and she befriends Cheryl's son Brett Stark (Brett Blewitt). Lou shows her his used car business and offers a car to make up for the birthdays he has missed. Lou and Cheryl's relationship becomes strained and Lou moves in with his daughter. Ling Mai tries to talk to Cheryl, before she and Cheryl's mother Marlene Kratz (Moya O'Sullivan) get the couple to reconcile.

Lou pays for Ling Mai's university funding, and tries to get her a show at the local radio station. He also takes her to the beach, so he can teach her how to swim. Ling Mai later tells Lou that she is leaving Australia, as her boyfriend, Bin, has come over from Hong Kong and has proposed to her. Lou thanks her for getting in touch and meeting him. On Boxing Day 2003, Lou receives a congratulatory telegram from Ling Mai for his wedding to Trixie Tucker (Wendy Stapleton). He visits her the following year, while he is in Hong Kong helping Trixie promote a production of Hello Dolly! she is starring in. Nine years later, Lou decides to get back in contact with Ling Mai and learns she is living and working for a charity in Cambodia. He flies out to spend a few months with her.

== Others ==
Date(s)	Character	Actor	Circumstances
25 January	Claudia	Helen Hopkins	Claudia becomes Mark Gottlieb's new housemate. A jealous Annalise Hartman tells Claudia that Mark is very house proud and does not like her dog. Annalise also suggests that Mark helped kill a cat belonging to the previous housemate. Claudia tells Mark that she is moving out and that he should be reported to the RSPCA.
28 January–4 February	Stefano	Dino Marnika	An Italian fashion designer who hosts an event at Lassiter's. He and Gaby Willis begin talking fashion after Gaby agrees to help him get into Australian fashion magazines and soon build up a friendship. Stefano offers Gaby the chance to become his personal assistant in Europe. After some thought, Gaby accepts and goes overseas with Stefano. However, a month later, Gaby returns and tells her parents Doug and Pam that Stefano didn't take her seriously. This is later revealed to be a lie as Gaby tells Stefano she had to leave and subsequently reveals to Doug and Pam that she is pregnant. Doug thinks Stefano is the father but Gaby denies it and confirms that Jack Flynn is.
7 February 1994 – 27 August 1996	Alan McKenna	Ian Swan	Alan is a geography teacher at Erinsborough High. His stern disciplinary methods prove unpopular with students. Alan tells Billy Kennedy off when he is late with an assignment and sees straight through his lie that he left it in his father Karl Kennedy's car. He also embarrasses Billy when he arrives at school wearing the same jacket. Alan is later promoted to Vice Principal and Andrew Watson assumes his previous position. He catches Hannah Martin with a lit cigarette at the dance and assumes she is smoking, but she is actually covering for Toadfish Rebecchi. Alan buys Malcolm Kennedy and Stonefish Rebecchi's car, unaware that it was previously stolen by drug dealers. Alan's last on-screen appearance is when he discovers a hip flask full of alcohol. Malcolm, who is working on at maintenance at school offers to take the blame, but the real culprit Shona Munro owns up and Alan suspends her and cancels the job at school, prompting Malcolm's business partner Darren Stark to threaten him. Alan resigns the following school year.
15–16 February	Tim	Drew Tingwell	Tim corners Annalise Hartman when she is closing up The Waterhole one night. She realises that he is the person who has been stalking her the last few weeks. Tim holds Annalise hostage and is convinced that they are item. Mark Gottlieb rescues Annalise and Tim lunges towards him with a hammer but Mark is able to overpower him and the police arrive to take Tim away.
17 February 1994 – 19 July 1995	Sassy Patterson-Smythe	Defah Dattner	Sassy is a student from West Waratah Tech who attends the diabetic clinic at Erinsborough Hospital and quickly makes friends with Danni Stark, who also attends the clinic and invites her to her birthday dinner the following week and suggests that Danni goes as Martin's date. Sassy later pursues Danni's brother Brett, to his discomfort. Gaby Willis reveals Brett and Sassy's schools are merging, much to the former's dismay. Sassy leads Brett into trouble when she lies about breaking up with her boyfriend, Stonefish Rebecchi, who punches Brett as a result. She later auditions for a band with some of her classmates but many people dislike her singing voice and vote her out of the band. Sassy later gets into a fight at the Debutante Ball with Cody Willis and rips her dress. Sassy makes her last appearance tutor Stonie to help him pass Year 12, much to Cody's jealousy but Stonie assures her that all his old feelings for Sassy have gone and Cody is the one for him.
17–24 February	Martin	Brenden Carter	Martin meets Danni Stark at Erinsborough Hospital's diabetic clinic and they go on a date. However, Danni's feelings are hurt when Martin admits he cares for her, but not in a romantic way.
22–28 February	Rhonda Muir	Julie Day	The Head Chambermaid at Lassiter's. Cheryl Stark, on the pretence of being an applicant for the position of chambermaid, asks Rhonda to show her how to do the job. Rhonda shows Cheryl how to cut corners with cleaning and tells tales of wild staff parties. She talks about Cheryl not knowing how to run Lassiter's as she is only a lottery winner. A few days later, Rhonda is called into the office and Cheryl confronts on her behaviour and being lax in her role which resulted in laundry theft. Philip Martin leaves her to fire Rhonda. An upset Rhonda then tells Cheryl she has five children to support on her and there is no other work. Cheryl, unable to fire Rhonda, gives her another a chance.
23 February–3 March	Alan Briggs	Eric Donnison	Alan is the father of Gary Briggs. He appears at a father-son cricket match and upsets Michael Martin when he brings up his criminal past and warns him not to cheat. The following week, Gary is a killed in a drag-racing accident. Alan blames Rick Alessi, Gary's opponent, for his son's death and tries to attack him but Lou Carpenter intervenes and talks to Alan. When a memorial service is held at the school for Gary, Alan has the wrecked car towed into the car park and says that it will be more of a reminder than a tree ever would be.
25 February 1994 – 11 June 1997	Rupert Sprod	Tobi Webster	Rupert is a student at Erinsborough High. After Gary Briggs is killed in a drag race with Rick Alessi, Rupert asks for all the details of the accident, but is pushed away by Rick's friend Michael Martin. Rupert witnesses Malcolm Kennedy accidentally shooting Lou Carpenter in the leg when Malcolm tries to impress him and Danni Stark with a hunting rifle. Rupert fails Year 12 and repeats it along with Danni, who uses him to make Malcolm jealous. After learning his teacher, Andrew Watson is gay, Rupert begins a harassment campaign against him and eggs him while driving. Rupert dates Libby Kennedy, but cheats on her with Rochelle Stig at a party to celebrate the football team's win and the event is captured in a photo. Rupert apologises and pleads with Libby to take him back and she considers it, but realises he will only hurt her again. She takes revenge by editing footage of Rupert playing and using the photo with some commentary about footballers being untrustworthy. Billy Kennedy asks for Rupert's help in a plan to prove to Anne Wilkinson that the streets are not safe for girls at night. Rupert poses as an attacker, but is quickly fended off by Anne's martial arts moves.
3 March	Mrs Starvaggi	Sylvie Fonti	Miranda Starvaggi's mother. She brings Miranda to Number 26 Ramsay Street to own up to a series of prank calls and threatening letters, which Hannah Martin has been blamed for.
3 March 1994 – 7 September 1995	Miranda Starvaggi	Leah de Niese	Miranda is a classmate of Hannah Martin. She is revealed to be behind a series of prank phonecalls and threatening letters, after Hannah is initially accused of being the culprit. Miranda explains she did this because Hannah did not invite her to her birthday party. She and Hannah make up and get into various scrapes. Miranda makes her last appearance when she, Hannah and Zoe Tan unwittingly eat a watermelon laced with vodka, resulting in the three of them getting drunk.
3–4 March	Michael Whitney	Himself	After Wayne Duncan quits his job at Erinsborough High, he assures Brett Stark and Michael Martin that he will find a replacement cricket coach, and he later brings Michael Whitney to the sports centre. Michael helps Brett with his confidence, before the group go to Lassiter's. Michael sees Cheryl Stark and reveals that they used to date. Michael agrees to sign autographs and answer some questions before he leaves, but Brett takes up most of his time.
8–17 March	Sophie Giradi	Antonietta Morgillo	Sophie is a Hypnotherapist who Cheryl Stark sends her son Brett to in order for him to become more confident at playing cricket. She hypnotises him and The therapy seems to work and Brett's game improves. The following week Brett visits Sophie in order to gain confidence with dating, which ultimately fails.
11–29 March	Tom Weaver	George Mallaby	Tom is an estate agent who takes a romantic interest in Pam Willis, after meeting at an art class. He showers Pam with gifts and even proposes to her, knowing that she is married. Pam lets Tom down gently, and he admits that he misses his own wife.
15 March	Bob Lazarus	Robert Macleod	A local butcher who supplies Lassiters Hotel with meat. He suggests Annalise Hartman represents Bob's Butchery in the Miss Erinsborough charity beauty contest, but she declines. He also asks Annalise's colleague, Kristy but she rejects the offer too, telling Bob that she is a vegetarian.
18 March–20 June	Amelia Sung	Susan Tan	Amelia is a doctor at Erinsborough Hospital. She tends to Tom Weaver's teenage son, Eric when he suffers an epileptic fit. She also treats Debbie Martin when she collapses due to bulimia and treats a pregnant Cheryl Stark when she is admitted after Julie Martin accidentally reverses her car into her.
21 March	Eric Weaver	Guy Mallaby	Eric is Tom Weaver's teenage son, who is brought into Erinsborough Hospital after suffering an epileptic fit and is attended to by Pam Willis during his recovery.
23 March 1994 – 13 January 1995	Squirrel	Brooke Howden	Squirrel is one of the many students transferring to Erinsborough High when her previous school West Waratah Tech merges with Erinsborough High. She attends the Debutante Ball with Sam Kratz. Several months later, Squirrel reappears and tells Sam that she is pregnant and he is the father of the child. After confessing to Sam's cousin Danni Stark that Sam is not the father, Danni urges Squirrel to tell Sam the truth, which she does. Squirrel then leaves to stay with her aunt in the country.
23 March 1994 – 3 August 1995	Leanne "Packo" Packington	Verity McIntyre	Packo is part of a new wave of students following a merger between Erinsborough High and West Waratah Tech. She becomes fast friends with Danni Stark. Packo bullies Hannah Martin on her first day of high school and later becomes Billy Kennedy's violin tutor. Billy develops a crush on Packo, but when he tells her, she laughs and scoffs at him, hurting his feelings.
24–28 March	Mr Habbersfield	Norman Hancock	Chrissie is an ex-girlfriend of Michael Martin, from when he slept rough on the streets of Sydney. Michael and Cody Willis search for Chrissie and ask her father, Mr Habbersfield for her whereabouts. Mr Habbersfield tells them Chrissie has brought shame on the family. Chrissie reveals to Michael that she may be HIV-positive, prompting him to be worried about his own health as they had unprotected sex. Michael tries to get Chrissie to reconcile with her father, she is angry and resistant first as her parents threw her out when she became pregnant. Michael returns to see Mr Habbersfield, who at first, refuses to back down on his stance on Chrissie but he is shocked when he learns she had miscarried. Chrissie and her father then renconcile after she overhears the conversation. Both Michael and Chrissie are tested and the results return negative.
24–28 March	Chrissie	Adele Danielle	
25 March–25 May	Perry Spring	Roy Thompson	Perry interviews Gaby Willis for the position of manager at Lassiter's. They clash during the interview but several days later, Perry agrees to hire Gaby as he was impressed by her forthrightness and honesty. Perry later complains to Philip Martin at the Newsagency that his paper has not been delivered.
29 March–18 May	Jesse O'Connor	James Ryan	Jesse is a classmate of Hannah Martin at Erinsborough Primary. He puts up a notice for his lost snake at the news agency and Hannah's father, Philip tells him it may be the one that came into their house. Jesse comes over and Hannah is rude to him. He denies the snake is his but Hannah explains the snake has shed its skin. Jesse is then dared by some boys at school to spend the night in an abandoned house but is caught by Doug and Pam Willis. Hannah is later jealous when Jesse begins hanging out with Starvaggi. Jesse is later dared by some boys in his class to throw a water bomb at Hannah which upsets her. The two later foil an arson attack on Kia-Ora, the house Doug is renovating. Doug rewards Jesse and Hannah by taking them to a visit to the Zoo. However, this is cut short when Jesse's father, Aaron arrives and is annoyed that Jesse is hanging around with Hannah after he forbade him. Aaron later takes Jesse out of school and they move away, much to Hannah's distress.
30 March	Gwen Childs	Robin Bissett	When Michael Martin attempts to return Len Mangel's jacket to him, he arrives at the address on a card, only to be met by Gwen. Gwen tells Michael that Len conned her out of her savings and warns that he will do the same to Michael's step-great-grandmother Helen Daniels.
8 April–22 September	Tennyson Jones	Warwick Comber	A local contest judge who first judges the Miss Erinsborough charity pageant and he and his panel unaninmously vote for Soula Papadopolous the winner, which annoys Annalise Hartman. Tennyson later reappears when a local baby contest is to take place. Cheryl Stark asks Tennyson and some other judges if they would mind holding it at the Waterhole. An agreement is initially in place but when Cody Willis and Serendipity Gottlieb arrive protesting against baby contests, the judges change their minds.
15 April–31 May	Kris Hyde	John Higginson	Kris is hired by Gaby Willis as her personal assistant and they begin dating. The relationship does not last long, as Kris is revealed to be married with children and has been planning on conning Lassiter's out of money.
21–22 April	Barry Morgan	Don Bridges	Barry is an English Teacher and Sports Coach at Erinsborough High. He refuses to let the girls play on the basketball team but eventually relents.
21–27 April	Anna Borobokas	Judith Graham	Anna meets Len Mangel when he is delivering newspapers for Philip Martin. Philip's son, Michael, witnesses Len flirting with Anna and attempts to expose it to Helen Daniels. Helen dismisses this but Michael's sister, Debbie agrees to help Michael reveal Len for the con artist he is. They arrange to meet Anna and inform her of Len's dishonest dealings and his attempt to rip Helen off. Len pays Anne a second visit at the end of his round and when Anna returns some magazines to Len, Helen asks who she is.
29 April 1994 – 2 October 1995	Mary Cochrane	Jennifer Botica	Mary is a council official. She helps Debbie Martin and Cody Willis in their mission to stop preserve Kia-Ora, a house that Cody's father, Doug has recently renovated. Cody makes a video and films Mary talking about the house, to show her council colleagues. The project is successful and Mayor Khan Ozturk purchases the house to turn into a local history museum. A few months later, Mary helps Anne Teschendorff oversee the Deb ball and later approves the idea of a Drop-in centre for teens on Miller Street. She also attends the unveiling of newly elected Mayor Lou Carpenter's portrait.
3 May–11 July	Megan Levy	Michelle Twidgen	Megan takes an interest in some home-brewed beer Doug Willis and Lou Carpenter have made and considers buying some. However, when Rick Alessi and Cody Willis hear that the police want to catch Lou and Doug, they race to them in time to prevent them selling the beer to Megan. Megan then reveals she is a police officer too but does not pursue the matter too seriously and persuades her colleagues to try some beer.
4 May–30 June	Khan Ozturk	Senol Mat	Khan is the Mayor of Erinsborough. He and his wife Fatimah attend the Deb Ball. Khan resigns the following year after a corruption scandal is exposed, leaving Lou Carpenter to run for his vacant position.
9 May–3 June	Bert Lazarus	Marcus Eyre	The brother of local butcher, Bob Lazarus. When Mark Gottlieb, the head chef at Lassiter Hotel, complains about the quality of Bert's meat and expresses concern that customers may be poisoned, Bert takes offence as his family have been supplying Lassiters for a long time. He ceases dealing with Lassiters and begins legal proceedings against Mark. He later challenges Lassiters to a bowling competition against his team at the butchers. On the day of the match, Bert and his wife Bianca arrive with the news that their son, Xylo has injured his ankle, making them a bowler short. Philip Martin suggests his son Michael Martin bowl for Bert's team as a substitute and Michael scores the winning strike.
9–12 May	John Muir	Benjamin Grant	John is Sally Pritchard's housemate. She discusses Rick Alessi's marriage proposal with him and Gaby Willis. John advises her to break up with Rick, as he is too young. John later suggests that they pretend to be a couple to put Rick off, but Sally is unsure about using John.
10 May–26 July	Artie Goldberg	Bill Ten Eyck	A local music mogul. He arrives at Number 26 Ramsay Street looking for Michael Martin. He tells Michael he read an article in the Erinborough News about Michael saving the life of a taxi driver who fell unconscious. Artie tells him he is the manager of the Honey Pigs, who happen to be Danni Stark's favorite band and arranges for Michael and Danni to meet them. However, the band appear to be obnoxious much to Danni's annoyance. A few months later, Artie reappears when he notices Danni is the lead singer of a band and decides he wants to sign her to his label, exclusively as a solo artist. Danni is thrilled and breaks the news to bandmates Cody Willis and Brett Stark, who support her in her decision. However, Artie has no intention of using Danni's vocals but instead having her mime in videos to a vocal track by a session singer. Danni, after much thought, rejects Artie's offer of stardom.
18 May–22 August	Tiberio	Peter Ghin	A Barman at the Waterhole. He advises a reluctant Mark Gottlieb to attend his disciplinary meeting with Gaby Willis.
24 May 1994 – 27 October 1995	Anne Teschendorff	Lois Collinder	Anne is the principal of West Waratah Tech and takes over at Erinsborough High, assuming the position after Vince Roland leaves and the schools merge. When Debbie Martin spots Anne sitting having a drink with Andrew MacKenzie at the waterhole, she gets the wrong idea and assumes Anne is interested in Andrew and tells her she is too old for him, which results in Debbie being ejected from the pub for being underage after Anne points it out. Anne later mediates with Philip Martin and Cheryl Stark over their respective children Michael and Danni when their relationship effects their schooling. Anne later takes Year 12 to task over a dangerous muck-up day prank involving a fuse box, costing the school thousands of dollars. She threatens to ban the Year from taking exams at the school unless somebody confesses. Brett Stark confesses to the prank.
15 June 1994 – 19 October 1995	Vikram Chatterji	Nigel Rodrigues	Vikram is a colleague of Philip Martin at his Newsagency. When some money goes missing, Philip's wife Julie is quick to blame Vikram, as he has mentioned money problems in the past. Vikram, offended, resigns. When Julie apologises, Vikram returns to work. When Vikram's sister, Lata arrives, he objects to her dating. When he catches her and Brett Stark kissing, he sends Lata to live with their aunt Rupa.
22–24 June	Duck	Brian Nankervis	A ghost hunter from a television show "Spook Spotters", who arrives at Number 26 after Hannah Martin calls them believing the house is Haunted. Duck and his colleague, Flash spray the house in order to cleanse it and charge $500, much to the annoyance of Hannah's father, Philip who grudgingly pays the fee.
30 June–19 July	Gough O'Hara	Ben Solowiej	Gough is Hannah Martin's partner for the presentation at the Deb Ball. He later brings his horse to Hannah's birthday party much to her delight.
30 June	Fatimah Ozturk	Ijlal Iz	Fatimah attends the Deb Ball alongside her husband, the Mayor of Erinsborough Khan Ozturk.
30 June–3 November	Melody "Butza" Xander	Emily Stanza	Butza is a student who transfers from West Waratah Tech to Erinsborough High when the schools merge. She is frequently seen hanging around with Packo, Sassy Patterson-Smythe and Squirrel.
12–29 July	Cassandra Rushmore	Radha Mitchell	Cassandra is a sky-diving instructor, who helps Rick Alessi with his impending parachute jump. Rick and Cassandra share a brief flirtation, and she offers him a job at her father's hotel Parkside Pacific. Rick is tempted by the offer, but ultimately rejects it to stay with Lassiter's. Cassandra tells Cody Willis that she will keep trying to lure Rick to Parkside, but Cody warns her that she will not let it happen.
19 July–4 August	Rita Toulis	Nadja Kostich	Rita is a counsellor at a clinic Debbie Martin is attending for bulimia. She asks Debbie's family to sit in on a session when they visit. As the session progress, Debbie reveals some of the Martins' problems to Rita much to Debbie's stepmother, Julie's discomfort. However, the family feel better for the session and Rita feels they have made progress.
20 July–14 September	Lata Chatterji	Kamila Webb	Lata is Vikram's sister. Brett Stark shows an interest in her and they begin dating. When Vikram catches them alone, he is enraged and sends Lata to live with their aunt Rupa. Before she leaves, Lata gives Brett a Galah, whom he names Dahl.
22 July–7 September	Kim Roth	Jeremy Fuller	A hairdresser who attends the same clinic as Debbie Martin when she is undergoing counselling for bulimia. At first they clash, but eventually become friends. Kim makes a romantic pass at Debbie, but she rejects him. When Kim offers to style Debbie's hair, she agrees, but walks out when she becomes paranoid that his stylists are making fun of her. They reconcile once again and Debbie agrees to be Kim's model for a hairdressing competition, which they win.
5 August 1994, 21 June 1996	Reverend	John Grigg	A local priest who conducts the christening of Louise Carpenter. In his second appearance, he conducts the wedding of Rob Evans and Joanna Hartman.
12 August 1994 – 29 August 1995	Det. Sgt. Illich	Rod Densley	Illich is a local detective who makes his first appearance when Gaby Willis' son, Zac goes missing. Illich later reappears when Julie Martin suffers a fall and he questions her husband, Philip. When Julie dies, Illich and his colleague Detective Hackman arrest Philip at her cremation. The following year, Illich returns to question Bianca Zanotti over some stolen jewellery and investigates a spate of Ramsay Street burglaries. Illich later returns and poses as Richard Cross in an undercover operation to bring down criminal Roger Reynolds. The plan goes well until Joanna Hartman offers Roger money and when the cover is blown, Roger steals the cash and runs. Illich is annoyed with Joanna as the police have been after Roger for two years.
18 August 1994 – 11 March 1996	Fabian Conte	Michael A. King	Fabian is a local fashion writer. He applies for Annalise Hartman's vacant Room at Number 30 and is interviewed by Mark Gottlieb and Rick Alessi. Rick is keen on Fabian moving in but Mark is against it and as a result, Fabian is turned down. A few months later, Mark's sister, Serendipity Gottlieb invites him over to Number 30 to see some of Danni Stark's designs, which she passes off as her own. He later interviews Danni and gives her a job. Fabian is last seen driving Danni when he invites her to a fashion show.
19–25 August	Lynette Thorneycroft	Libby Tanner	Lynette is interviewed by Mark Gottlieb and Rick Alessi as a potential new housemate to move into Number 30. When a removal truck arrives on Ramsay Street and Hannah Martin witnesses Lynette loading it with items rather than unpacking, she is suspicious and tells her father, Philip. After Philip refuses to believe Hannah, she tries to tackle Lynette herself. When Lynette tries to foil Hannah's attempt to expose her, Mark and Rick arrive home and catch her. She is then arrested.
26–30 August	Moina Beresford	Esme Melville	Moina is the mother of Pam Willis, who attends the naming day of her great-grandson Zac. Moina warns her son-in-law, Doug Willis, about eating fatty foods, as she believes that is what led to her husband's death. Moina believes that Seamus died from eating a green potato, when he actually died of a heart attack. Moina travels home with Beth Brennan.
1–23 September	Barb Connel	Ruth Yaffe	Barb hires Sam Kratz as a personal trainer and she is grateful for his services. While they are having a drink, Sam's grandmother, Marlene Kratz accuses Sam of being a gigolo and tells Barbara she is old enough to be is mother, much to the embarrassment of them both. Barb then leaves the pub. A few weeks later, Barb propositions Sam much to his horror and he rejects her advances. Barb, insulted threatens to Alan Crowley, head of Lassiter's. Sam tries to fight his corner on the grounds of sexual harassment, but Barb gets to Crowley first and Sam quits.
14 September 1994–2013	Dahl	Uncredited	Dahl is a galah given to Brett Stark by his girlfriend Lata Chatterji, before she leaves Erinsborough to live with her aunt. When Brett leaves to sail around the world, he leaves Dahl with Libby Kennedy. Dahl stays with Libby's family after she leaves Erinsborough. In 2010, Libby's father Karl decides to enter Dahl into a Million Paws Walk, which raises money for the RSPCA. Karl later finds Dahl has gone missing from her cage. Lou Carpenter finds Dahl and uses her in his advertisements for his car yard. He and Karl compete with each other for Dahl. She later flies into Toadfish Rebecchi's house, and he brings her back to Karl. In 2014, Karl and Susan Kennedy began talking about Dahl in the past tense, signifying that she was no longer with them. In 2021, Susan reveals that one day, Dahl flew out of an open window and was never seen again. Karl admits that Valerie Grundy's cat then ate Dahl and Karl buried her in the backyard.
15–28 September	Paulo Cechero	Hannes Berger	Paulo is a friend of Serendipity Gottlieb who arrives to stay at Number 30. Paulo attends a Murder Mystery weekend with several of the Ramsay Street residents, but leaves soon after the weekend is cancelled following the very real death of Julie Martin.
23–26 September	Detective Hackman	Colin James	A police detective who along with his colleague Detective Sgt. Illich arrests Philip Martin at his wife Julie's cremation and questions him.
26–27 September	Victoria Smith	Mary-Rose Cuskelly	Victoria answers Cheryl Stark's advert for a nanny for her daughter Louise. Victoria's references check out, however, as soon as Cheryl is out of sight she begins smoking indoors, going through Cheryl's jewellery and is inattentive to Louise. When Serendipity Gottlieb comes to the house, Victoria is keen to get rid of her. Cheryl arrives home to uncover Victoria's unreliability and laziness for herself, and promptly fires her.
11 October–1 November	Chip Kelly	Martin Crewes	Chip is a footballer who Serendipity Gottlieb takes a shine to. Karl Kennedy notices Chip's mood swings and wonders if he is abusing steroids. Serendipity is suspicious when Chip begins standing her up for dates and her worst fears are confirmed when Chip becomes violent after she rebuffs his advances during a dinner date at his place. Serendipity manages to escape and her friend Sam Kratz beats up Chip.
11–12 October	Dr. Andrew Davies	Peter Docker	A doctor who Sam Kratz visits following a knee injury during a football game. He suggests Sam take an anabolic steroid, much to his horror and storms out. Sam then tells Karl Kennedy who then confronts Andrew, who sees nothing wrong with athletes using steroids and tries to justify it. Karl is horrified then resigns from the clinic.
18 October 1994 – 4 October 1995	Alf Taylor	Frank Bren	Alf is Colin Taylor's twin brother. He meets Mark Gottlieb and Annalise Hartman, while on their road trip across Australia and bores them with numerous stories about his life. Alf later visits Colin in Erinsborough, much to everybody's surprise. When Colin suspects Alf is making romantic advances towards Marlene Kratz, he fights with Alf, who confesses that he has no interest in Marlene as he is gay, which shocks both Colin and Marlene. After a talk with Colin, Alf leaves.
19–25 October	Bullies	Andrew White	Two boys at Erinsborough High who begin bullying Billy Kennedy. They beat him up twice but leave Billy alone when Stonefish Rebecchi begins protecting him.
19–25 October	Bullies	Douglas Lukic	Two boys at Erinsborough High who begin bullying Billy Kennedy. They beat him up twice but leave Billy alone when Stonefish Rebecchi begins protecting him.
24 October 1994 – 2 February 1995	Father Michael Graham	Greg Scealy	Father Graham is a Catholic priest who Mark Gottlieb consults with in the run-up to his wedding to Annalise Hartman. Father Graham conducts the ceremony and later advises Mark when he decides he wants to join the priesthood.
27 October	Dr. Tamsin Caldo	Soula Alexander	Tamsin is a potential partner for Karl Kennedy in the Erinsborough Medical centre. She and her husband Joseph, share a meal with Karl and his wife Susan at the Waterhole to finalise details of Karl and Tamsin's partnership. When Karl temporarily gives up medicine over a crisis of faith following Cheryl Stark's death, he refers all of his patients to Tamsin.
7 November 1994 – 26 May 2006	Casserole		Billy Kennedy comes across a lamb while out on his paper round, and he brings it home with him. He tells his family and friends that he has named the lamb Casserole or "Cassie" for short. Cassie remains with the Kennedys after Billy leaves and lives in their back yard. In 2006, Cassie becomes ill and dies. Billy's parents Karl and Susan Kennedy hold a funeral service for her.
7–15 November	Judges	Susan Cooper	Two talent contest judges who arrive to see Philip Martin, Colin Taylor and Vikram Chatterji's barbershop trio act. On the day of the contest, Colin misses his cues and is generally clumsy. As a result, the judges give the trio last place.
7–15 November	Judges	Nathan King	Two talent contest judges who arrive to see Philip Martin, Colin Taylor and Vikram Chatterji's barbershop trio act. On the day of the contest, Colin misses his cues and is generally clumsy. As a result, the judges give the trio last place.
8 November 1994 – 9 January 1995	Molly Harrison	Robyn Hughan	Molly is mistaken by Philip Martin for his late wife, Julie, after she walks into his newsagency wearing Julie's old clothes. Molly dates Philip, but the relationship is opposed by his daughter, Hannah. Hannah warms to Molly eventually, but Philip breaks up with her.
14 November 1994 – 9 August 1996	Marilyn Tanno	Catherine Milte	Marilyn is the station manager at Radio Erinsborough, who gives Lou Carpenter a job as an on-air talent. When a publicity photo of Lou giving Marilyn a kiss on the cheek is printed, Danni Stark gets the wrong idea and tells her mother Cheryl. Lou explains that Marilyn is his new boss. Marilyn later hires Marlene Kratz as a presenter much to Lou's chagrin.
22–24 November	Jason Von Thunan	Kristian Pithie	Jason is Malcolm Kennedy's friend from the country, who lets Malcolm and his friends use his beach house over the holidays. When Malcolm and Danni Stark are missing during a storm, Jason and Stonefish Rebecchi find them. Before Malcolm and the others return to Erinsborough, Jason lets him know of a rumour going around their old hometown that Malcolm's father Karl killed a patient.
