= Brenda Webb =

- Born: Grafton, New South Wales
- Occupations: Singer, actress
- Musical career
- Genres: Rock

Brenda Webb is an indigenous Australian singer and actress. Her debut single "Little Black Girl" was nominated for the ARIA Award for Best Independent Release.

"Little Black Girl" was released in 1993 and received radio airplay all over the country. Another song "Melting Pot" (a cover a Blue Mink song) was used by NSW Aboriginal Land Council for an anti-racism campaign.

"Little Black Girl" was originally credited as being written by Webb and Wendy May Dempster but was actually written primarily by Dempster and Christopher Lloyd Bowen who took legal action soon after the song's release. The issue was settled in 1996 and Webb publicly acknowledged that she was not the main writer.

Webb was pursuing an acting career before her music become successful. She appeared in some educational videos for Film Australia and a few plays. She also made an appearance in A Country Practice. Webb played teacher Sally Pritchard in television soap opera Neighbours for six weeks in 1994.

== Discography ==
=== Singles ===
Title	Year
"Little Black Girl"	1993
"Melting Pot"	1994

== Awards and nominations ==
=== ARIA Music Awards ===
The ARIA Music Awards are a set of annual ceremonies presented by Australian Recording Industry Association (ARIA), which recognise excellence, innovation, and achievement across all genres of the music of Australia. They commenced in 1987.

Year	Nominee / work	Award	Result	Ref.
1994	"Little Black Girl"	Best Independent Release	Nominated	
