= Debbie Martin =

Fictional Australian TV character

- Neighbours character
- Marnie Reece-Wilmore as Debbie
- Portrayed by: Mandy Storvik (1985); Katrina McEwan (1985); Marnie Reece-Wilmore (1992–2005)
- Duration: 1985, 1992–1994, 1996–1997, 2005
- First appearance: 22 July 1985
- Last appearance: 27 July 2005
- Created by: Reg Watson
- Introduced by: Reg Watson (1985); Don Battye (1992); Bill Searle (1996); Ric Pelizzeri (2005)
In-universe information
- Occupation: Student; Coffee Shop waitress and manager; Lassiters Hotel employee
- Father: Philip Martin
- Mother: Loretta Martin
- Stepmother: Julie Martin
- Brothers: Michael Martin
- Half-sisters: Hannah Martin

Debbie Martin is a fictional character from the Australian soap opera Neighbours, played by Marnie Reece-Wilmore. She made her first appearance during the episode broadcast on 22 July 1985. Debbie was originally played by Mandy Storvik and Katrina McEwan. Reece-Wilmore was cast in the role when the character was reintroduced with her family in 1992. She had to relocate to Melbourne for filming. The character later became part of the serial's new "brat pack". Reece-Wilmore left Neighbours in late 1994, but returned in 1996 upon the promise of exciting storylines and a new look for her character. She departed on 22 October 1997, but reprised her role for the show's 20th anniversary celebration episode on 27 July 2005.

== Casting ==
Mandy Storvik was the first actress to play Debbie in 1985, followed by Katrina McEwan. The Martin family were reintroduced to Neighbours in 1992 to add "a bit of life to the programme." Marnie Reece-Wilmore was cast in the "much sought after" role of Debbie. She was initially reluctant to attend the audition because she was out with friends and saw it as an interruption. Reece-Wilmore explained "I just wanted to get it over with and get back to the shops. When I think back on it now I realise how close I came to messing it up because of my attitude." She was told she had the part of Debbie a couple of weeks later.

When she was offered the role of Debbie, Reece-Wilmore was still attending school. She had to relocate to Melbourne from Sydney for filming, which she found "traumatic" as she felt under prepared. She had to leave her family and her school to live alone in a new city, explaining "I'm the youngest in my family, so it was a big decision. I'd never been away from home before." She said the first few months of being in Melbourne were "terrible" as she did not know anyone and had to figure out how to get to places, which was "scary" for a 17 year old.

== Development ==
Debbie is the oldest child of Philip (Ian Rawlings) and Loretta Martin (Lyn Semler). Josephine Monore, author of Neighbours: The First 10 Years, said Debbie was not one of the show's glamour girls, but just "an ordinary girl next door" who did well at school because she worked hard. A reporter for Weekly News called Debbie "an enthusiastic and enterprising young student". A writer for the BBC described Debbie as having spirit, gumption and determination. They added "The poor girl did have her dark moments, though. She had it in her head that she was not nearly as pretty as the girls at school, or her neighbours, and that can be a terrible curse for a teenager."

Denise Deason of TV Week called Debbie "Ramsay Street's schoolgirl with a rebel streak". Reece-Wilmore said she was not as easily led astray as Debbie, as she worries about the consequences too much and is "too nervous to be a rebel." At the start of 1994, Neighbours decided to push for "a younger, livelier look, with six regular characters under the age of 18" and Debbie became part of the show's new "brat pack", along with her brother Michael Martin (Troy Beckwith), Cody Willis (Peta Brady), Rick Alessi (Dan Falzon), and newcomers Brett Stark (Brett Blewitt) and Danni Stark (Eliza Szonert).

In 1994, Debbie developed bulimia. She was struggling with the pressures of school and her unrequited love for Andrew "Macca" Mackenzie (John Morris). She was also depressed over the state of her father's marriage. Debbie was seen bingeing on food and then deliberately making herself sick. Her friends suspected something was wrong when they discovered a food stash underneath her bed, but Debbie denied having a problem until she collapsed at a rehearsal for the debutante ball and was rushed to hospital. Mary Fletcher of Inside Soap said "Friends and family have already realised something is wrong with the normally sunny-natured Debbie. It's not only puppy fat that she seems to be losing – her weight has dropped dramatically." Reece-Wilmore told Fletcher that everyone can remember a time when they felt like they were under a personal black cloud, but it probably felt like it was raining 24 hours a day for Debbie. Helen Daniels (Anne Haddy) became especially keen for Debbie to seek professional help for her condition and she went to stay in a clinic. Helen's daughter Rosemary (Joy Chambers) then invited Debbie to spend some time with her in America. Fletcher said the whole experience was a chance for Debbie to grow closer to her family.

Reece-Wilmore revealed she came up with the idea for the bulimia storyline, saying "When I came back from my Christmas holiday, I'd lost tons of weight. Everyone commented on my new figure and I thought to myself 'If there was anything wrong with me, those sorts of comments would have made me really paranoid about my weight.'" The actress then suggested the storyline, believing it was a subject familiar with a lot of teenage girls. The Neighbours bosses were initially "wary" of tackling such a difficult and sensitive storyline and a spokesperson said "We try to tackle serious issues such as bulimia as much as possible. We may not be able to wave a magic wand and make the problems go away, but by dealing with current situations they become topics for wider discussion." Reece-Wilmore added that she could see how eating disorders were connected to teenagers' anxieties about approaching adulthood as she used to make herself sick to avoid going to school.

Reece-Wilmore departed at the end of 1994, but was lured back to the soap with the promise of "sizzling" storylines and a new look for her character. Debbie's sudden return from the United States surprises her father. She sports "a sophisticated new image", but also seems troubled by something. Debbie eventually broke down and confessed that she had had a relationship with Rosemary's personal assistant and toyboy, Joel Supple (Bruce Hughes). Joel later arrived in Erinsborough and declared his love for Debbie, before asking her to return to the United States with him. A columnist for Inside Soap deemed the storyline "racy". In April 2005, Kris Green of Digital Spy reported that Reece-Wilmore would reprise her role for the show's 20th anniversary episode.

== Storylines ==
Debbie is taken to the hospital after she tries to commit suicide following escalating tensions between her parents Philip and Loretta. Several months later, Julie Robinson (Vikki Blanche) arrives to tell Debbie and her brother Michael (Samuel Hammington) that there has been a car accident and their mother is dead. Julie helps look after the children and she eventually marries Philip. The family live in the country and are heard from sparingly throughout the years.

The Martin family return to Erinsborough for the funeral of Todd Landers (Kristian Schmid), but get lost along the back roads, after finding Helen Daniels, who was taken hostage earlier by Todd's father, Bob (Bruce Kilpatrick). The family settle into Ramsay Street and Debbie is immediately attracted to Rick Alessi (Dan Falzon) and they begin dating much to Julie's chagrin. When Rick wins tickets to see Michael Jackson in London, he invites Debbie but knowing their respective parents, the teens concoct a plan with Rick's older brother, Marco (Felice Arena) acting as Rick's chaperone and while Helen and Debbie tell Philip and Julie that they will be visiting a friend of Helen's in the outback. The plan works and the four of them arrive in London. While there, Rick and Debbie encounter George Carter (Andrew Dicks), a young thief who has been stealing to raise money for his dying brother, Terry (Lee Cheesewright) to see Michael Jackson in concert. Rick and Debbie then give their tickets away. Their act of generosity makes news and the two appear on the Casey Butler show. They worry about the show being broadcast in Australia, but are assured that it will not. However, it makes Australian news and is eventually broadcast leaving Julie livid, sparking a war between the Martins and Alessis.

Debbie and Rick's relationship steps up a gear when the couple decide to have sex. Soon after, Rick's parents decide to move to Sydney, which could spell the end for the couple. However, Rick gets to stay. Debbie and Rick later break up and Debbie begins dating Darren Stark (Scott Major), who unknown to her, has served time in a juvenile detention centre with Michael (now Troy Beckwith). Rick tries to warn Debbie about Darren but she ignores the advice. After a robbery goes awry, resulting in Michael being shot while trying to save Debbie, Debbie realises Rick was right about Darren. When Andrew "Macca" McKenzie begins working for Doug Willis (Terence Donovan), Debbie becomes besotted with him. When Macca rejects Debbie's advances, she questions him and he reveals he is gay. Debbie spirals into an eating disorder, which is discovered by Cody Willis (Peta Brady) and Brett Stark (Brett Blewitt). More problems arise for Debbie when Julie dies and Philip is the prime suspect for pushing her off the roof of the hotel they stayed in during a Murder Mystery Weekend. Philip is cleared when Debbie reveals Julie had been drunk that night and she watched her fall from the roof.

Following Julie's funeral, Debbie agrees to go with Rosemary Daniels to New York. Several weeks later, Debbie receives a phone call while on 5th Avenue and talks with Philip. Debbie returns home in the wake of an affair with Rosemary's boyfriend, Joel Supple. After settling back in the area, Debbie begins first working at the pub and later the coffee shop. She is upset to find Darren has been released from prison and is cold towards him. When Luke Handley (Bernard Curry) is diagnosed with cancer and undergoes chemotherapy, Debbie is keen to help him and ends up embroiled in a battle for his affections with Danni Stark (Eliza Szonert). In the end, Luke chooses Danni. Debbie and Danni's feud continues which culminates in Debbie losing her job as a receptionist at Karl's surgery after fighting with her rival in front of patients. Danni later slaps Debbie in the face at a fashion launch when she is goaded about her relationship with Luke. Debbie establishes her own muffin trolley business which puts her in direct competition with a recently returned Madge and Harold who have taken over the coffee shop. After Philip advises her that the rivalry will put a strain on Helen's relationship with Madge, Debbie agrees to work with Madge and Harold as a partnership.

Debbie later becomes manager of the coffee shop and briefly begins a second romance with Darren (now Todd MacDonald). The relationship does not last as Debbie believes Darren still has feelings for his ex-girlfriend, Libby Kennedy (Kym Valentine). When Helen dies in October 1997, the family are devastated. Michael, who arrives home for the funeral suggests Debbie comes back to Marree with him. Their younger sister, Hannah (Rebecca Ritters), feels like everyone is deserting her, but Debbie comforts her and leaves with Michael after the funeral. Debbie and Rosemary also put the past behind them. Eight years later, Debbie appears in Annalise Hartman's (Kimberly Davies) documentary about Ramsay Street. She reveals she is working for the New York branch of Lassiter's.

== Reception ==
A writer for the BBC's Neighbours website named Debbie's most notable moments as "Going to London to see Michael Jackson" and "Tipping a bowl of dip over Rick Alessi's head during dinner." Matthew Clifton, writing for entertainment website Heckler Spray, included Debbie in his list of "The Best Ever Mid-90s Neighbours Characters". He said "One word: eyebrows." When Debbie developed feelings for Luke, an Inside Soap columnist stated "Debbie Martin certainly knows how to pick her men, doesn't she? After sinking her claws into her great aunt's toyboy she has now fallen for a man who has found out he has cancer. Talk about setting herself up for a fall. Just like her mother." Adam Beresford from HuffPost branded Debbie a "mixed-up" character. Katie Baillie writing for Metro included Debbie on a list of the "worst Neighbours characters" ever. Baillie explained that Debbie deserved inclusion because "she hardly ever smiled and watched as her step-mum drunkenly fell off a balcony to her death, then didn’t tell anyone about it. Jeeeez."
