= Frank Bren =

Australian actor, playwright, and scholar of film history

- Born: Frank Bren; September 7, 1943
- Died: April 14, 2018 (aged 74)
- Occupations: Actor; playwright; author; scholar
- Years active: as actor - 1967-2013

Frank Bren (7 September 1943 – 14 April 2018) was an Australian actor, playwright/dramatist, director, translator and author, who was a scholar of international film history. He has written books (on the histories of Polish and Hong Kong cinema), written plays, and acted in Australian film and television roles.

== Books and articles ==
Frank Bren was a scholar of Polish cinema and Chinese cinema film history. His book World Cinema 1: Poland (University of Illinois Press, 1989) is one of the premier resources on the history of Polish cinema.

His book (with Law Kar), Hong Kong Cinema: A Cross-Cultural View (The Scarecrow Press, 2004) is one of the few books to thoroughly document the very early history of Hong Kong cinema, dating back to its beginnings in the 19th century.

Bren was writing a biography of French filmmaker and comedian, Pierre Étaix.

Bren has also written articles on film for international journals such as Far Eastern Economic Review, Screen International, Films and Filming, as well as for newspapers such as Libération and The Asian Wall Street Journal.

== Acting career ==
=== Film, television and stage ===
Frank Bren played Colin "The Snake" Adder in Mark Savage's film Sensitive New Age Killer, and co-starred in the Craig Addison movie Betel Nut Girl. He also played two recurring roles, as twin brothers Colin Taylor and Alf Taylor, in the popular Australian TV series Neighbours during the 1990s. In addition, he played "Mr. Nicholson" in the film Hating Alison Ashley. He was preparing a biopic of Chinese-American film director Esther Eng.

In all, Bren has acted in over a dozen roles in Australian television series and movies, including The Flying Doctors, Blue Heelers and Stingers.

Frank Bren wrote and starred in the play A History of Motion Pictures, which ran at La Mama Theatre (Melbourne). He has also written and starred in about a dozen plays since 1967, with runs in London, Amsterdam, and Melbourne. Some of the other plays he both wrote and starred in are The Rise and Fall of Archie Jones (1968), Have You Noticed Your Leg Is Missing? (1969), Odyssey of a Bald Man (1970), Larceny Makes No Noise (1988), Muckrake (1989), Honest! (1993), and Flashback (1997).

== Death ==
Frank Bren died from cancer, aged 74, on 14 April 2018, at the Peter MacCallum Cancer Centre in Melbourne, Victoria. A tribute to his life was held at La Mama Theatre, and further tributes were written by writer John Snadden and film director Mark Savage.

== Filmography (selected) ==
Title	Year	Role
Life at Stake (TV series)	1978	Hostage
The Flying Doctors	1989	Vince
Boys from the Bush (TV series)	1991	Vince
Pugwall & Pugwall's Summer (TV series)	1989-1991	Dr. Pongerton
Boney (TV series)	1992	Rabbit
Funky Squad (TV series)	1995	
Neighbours (TV series)	1994-1995	Colin Taylor/Alf Taylor
Good Guys Bad Guys: Only the Good Die Young (TV movie)	1997	Bookie
Blue Heelers (TV series)	1998	Ronnie Fennell
Sensitive New Age Killer	2000	Colin 'The Snake' Adder
Bootleg (Tv miniseries)	2002	Shopkeeper
Trail of Passion (Video)	2003	Mal
MDA (TV series)	2003	Dr. Kenneth Patching
Stinger (TV series)	2002-2004	Eduardo
Hating Alison Ashley	2005	Mr. Nicholson
Bastard Boys (TV miniseries)	2007	Barrister
Betel Nut Girl	2013	Jack
