= Brett Stark =

- Neighbours character
- Portrayed by: Brett Blewitt
- Duration: 1993–1996, 2005, 2023
- First appearance: 30 November 1993
- Last appearance: 4 December 2023
- Introduced by: Alan Coleman (1993); Ric Pellizerri (2005); Jason Herbison (2023)
In-universe information
- Occupation: Student; Charity worker
- Father: Maurie Stark
- Mother: Cheryl Stark
- Brothers: Darren Stark
- Sisters: Janine Stark; Danni Stark
- Half-sisters: Lolly Allen
- Grandmothers: Marlene Kratz
- Uncles: Patrick Kratz
- First cousins: Sam Kratz

Brett Stark is a fictional character from the Australian soap opera Neighbours, played by Brett Blewitt. He made his first appearance during the episode broadcast on 30 November 1993, along with his sister, Danni Stark, and remained as a regular in the show until 8 March 1996. Blewitt returned as Brett for five weeks after the death of his on-screen mother, Cheryl. He departed along with Danni on 13 November 1996 and made a further cameo appearance in 2005 during Annalise Hartman's documentary about Ramsay Street, as part of Neighbours twenty-fifth anniversary. Blewitt again reprised his role from 4 December 2023. During his period in the serial he was portrayed as a "geek", a word that defined the character throughout his casting, storylines and perception among other characters. He had close friendly relationships with older women, including Susan Kennedy and Helen Daniels; he developed a crush on the latter, which generated bad reception from some. He went on to have an affair with an older woman named Judy Bergeman. He is an animal lover and was the owner of Dahl, the Galah who resided with the Kennedy family until 2014.

== Creation and casting ==
The character of Brett was created in 1993 as part of a new family, the Starks, joining already existing characters Cheryl Stark (Caroline Gillmer) and Darren Stark (Scott Major). Cheryl, his mother, moves in with him when he arrives with his sister, Danni Stark (Eliza Szonert), another new addition to the serial's cast.

Casting sessions were held with auditionees required to look geeky. Brett Blewitt went on to receive the role. Fellow Neighbours actor Ryan Moloney, who portrays Toadie Rebecchi, auditioned for the role but did not meet the requirements. Jesse Spencer, who would later go on to play Billy Kennedy, also auditioned for the role and reached the last three but was turned down due to being too young for the role. Blewitt later revealed the casting happened really fast and that two weeks after his audition, which he thought he had ruined, he was already moved to Melbourne and filming.

== Development ==
=== Characterisation ===
Brett has been portrayed as an extremely kind and caring character. He is a geek and bookish and knows plenty of trivia about wild animals. He always supported his family in their time of need; he was also approving of his mother's relationship with Lou Carpenter (Tom Oliver) because he wanted everyone to be happy, whereas the rest of his family were not. He also tried to keep his family together after his mother died, putting his own grief to one side. Throughout his duration he was close to Helen Daniels (Anne Haddy). Through their bond he later develops a crush on her, which other characters and media thought was odd. Of their closeness Blewitt stated: "I loved that Brett found such a close friend in Helen. Anything that challenged the social norm on the show I loved." Through his affair with Judy Bergman (Merridy Eastman) he was portrayed as being more "manly". This is in contrast to his early days in the serial when he used to get tongue-tied and didn't know how to act calmly around girls. Danni is a bad influence on Brett who is impressionable where Danni is concerned; she often led him astray through her antics.

Blewitt has described Brett as a "lovable dork". He also branded him a "real character" and "eccentric". Blewitt also described him as: "He was very comical [...] He was such an important character, in the way of a male role model, particularly in Australia. Brett was happy in his skin, he wasn't cool and he didn't have girls falling at his feet, but he was smart and loyal and from granny Helen to Stonefish, everyone valued Brett as a friend."

=== Departure and returns ===
In 1996 Blewitt quit the serial. He later said he made his decision based on the fact he only ever wanted to be on the show for around two years and didn't want to be scared of change. In 2005, Blewitt was asked to return in a cameo capacity; he accepted and was one of many ex-cast members who made a return to Neighbours to appear in an episode celebrating the show's 20th anniversary. The return came about after Linda Walker, the serial's production manager, approached him; they shot the scenes in Sydney Harbour. Blewitt reprised the role once more in 2023. The return was part of an ongoing storyline which resulted in a protest and riot against the closing of Erinsborough High, which leads to Brett and other former students joining.

== Storylines ==
Brett arrives in Ramsay Street with Danni after they are expelled from their boarding schools. Cheryl does not want her children to stay around, as she is enjoying her Lotto win. Cheryl has high ambitions for Brett, wanting him to study law. Brett becomes close to Helen; she helps him with his artist ambitions by applying for a job. Lou Carpenter uses Brett by giving him a job at the car lot, in order to get close to Cheryl. Cheryl and Lou begin a relationship; this infuriates Danni and Darren. Brett offers Cheryl support and approves of Lou. He becomes friends with Rick Alessi (Dan Falzon) to look popular, and tries to get him to become school captain. Brett also tries to win the affections of Debbie Martin (Marnie Reece-Wilmore), and tries to impress her by taking her on an expensive date using Cheryl's credit card. Debbie is flattered but is not looking for a relationship with Brett; however, she agrees to attend Erinsborough High's debutante ball with him and gives him a kiss at the end of the night.

Brett later gets a pet rat and lectures Danni about animal rights. He then begins a romance with Lata Chatterji (Kamila Webb), but her older brother Vikram (Nigel Rodrigues) is livid and disapproves of their relationship; they later end their romance after Lata is sent away to live with an aunt. As a parting gift, Lata buys Brett a Galah, which he names Dahl.

Brett's affections soon turn to Libby Kennedy (Kym Valentine), who has moved from Greendale with her family. He kisses her during a school play, but Libby criticises him for his bad kissing. Brett and Susan Kennedy (Jackie Woodburne) travel to Kenya. Brett claims that Cheryl ruined his life trying to get him to do things he didn't want; he then decides he doesn't want to attend university. When he returns home, his friendship with Libby gets back on track. He declares to his family he wants independence and builds an African-style tent in the garden and moves into it. Brett meets a golfing friend of his mother, Judy Bergman (Merridy Eastman); they get on well and begin to spend time together, eventually kissing and starting a secret affair. When everyone finds out, Brett leaves to go sailing around the world, and gives Dahl to the Kennedy family. During his sailing endeavour, Brett is held on suspicion of drug smuggling in Ecuador, but is eventually released.

After Cheryl dies, Brett returns; he feels guilty for not being around when Cheryl died, but Marlene reminds him how much she loved him and wanted him to be happy. Darren is uncontrollable; his actions make Brett's grief worse, but he chooses not to abandon him. Darren continues to threaten Lou over Cheryl leaving her whole estate to him; Lou tells Brett he will share his gains with the rest of the Stark family. Brett stays around to help Darren on a job; he later finds out Darren is doing the job to spite Malcolm Kennedy (Benjamin McNair), much to Brett's annoyance. Darren tries to rip Mal off, so Brett refuses to help him further. Brett comforts Libby when she decides to end her relationship with Darren, resulting in conflict between the brothers. Brett becomes upset that his family has fallen apart, so he and Danni leave to start a new life elsewhere. Before leaving, Brett and Darren reconcile and remain in contact. He later appears in Annalise Hartman's (Kimberley Davies) documentary on Ramsay Street, in which he jokes that he would be interested in seeing Libby again if she broke up with Darren.

Eighteen years later, Brett returns to Erinsborough to take part in a protest to save Erinsborough High. There, he is interviewed by Summer Hoyland (Jordy Lucas). Brett tells her that he has since married and settled in Tanzania, where he and his wife run a non-profit organisation that provides solar power to remote communities.

== Reception ==
Brett was positively received for his "kindly nature" by Josephine Monroe in her book "Neighbours: The first 10 years", she further described him stating: "Brett is the sort of boy most girls call a nerd. He's not particularly good-looking, is bookish, knows lots of useless information about the life-cycle of fruit flies and gets tongue-twisted in the presence of girls."

Entertainment website Hecklerspray profiled their favourite characters from the serial, one of them was Brett. Commenting on him they stated: "With a cleft chin of glory and a more intelligent persona than the average Ramsay Street resident (read: geek), Brett was old beyond his years." They went on to say how he is easily dragged into trouble by Danni and branding him as "boring" compared to her. Also stating that his relationships with Helen Daniels and Susan Kennedy were "creepy" even though they were not sexual, subsequently branding his and Susan's "African holiday" storyline as pointless. Paul Lang of entertainment website lowculture also branded Brett as "creepy" for his attraction to Helen.
