= Benjamin McNair =

Australian actor (born 1974)

- Born: 25 August 1974 (age 51); London, United Kingdom
- Occupation: Actor
- Known for: Neighbours, The Secret Life of Us

Benjamin John McNair (born 25 August 1974) is an Australian actor, best known for his role as Malcolm Kennedy in the soap opera Neighbours.

== Early life ==
McNair was born on 25 August 1974 in London. He moved to Australia with his family when he was 18 months old. He developed an interest in performing and studied at the Mona Vale Film & TV School, before completing a season at the NIDA Summer School in Sydney. He then joined the Australian Theatre for Young People.

== Career ==
After leaving school in 1992, McNair appeared in several television commercials and had guest roles in television dramas G.P. and Home and Away.

McNair played Malcolm Kennedy in the soap opera Neighbours from 1994 to 1997, returning briefly in 2002, 2004, 2011 and 2014 with a cameo appearance in 2005, and also in 2022.

He left Neighbours in 1997 and travelled to the UK where he performed on stage in several Christmas pantomimes such his role as Prince Charming in Sunderland's Cinderella and at Tunbridge Wells in Snow White and the Seven Dwarfs. Since leaving Neighbours, McNair has continued acting on television and stage. He was cast as Joseph in the original The Secret Life of Us telemovie for Network Ten in Australia in 2001 and later played Joseph, the boyfriend of Deborah Mailman, during the first season of television series of the same name.

He has guest-starred in television series such as All Saints (1999), Something in the Air (2001), and Blue Heelers (2000; 2002; 2005). He also played lead roles in Marshall Law (2002); Nine Network's Stingers (2004); Last Man Standing (2005); and the children's series Wicked Science. He co-starred in the short film Umbrella Men with Damian Walshe-Howling.

McNair continued to perform on stage, returning to England to play the role of Ferdinand in the Stafford Summer Festival's production of Shakespeare's The Tempest in 1999. He has also appeared as Matt in Broken; Darko Reeves in Blowback; Casper St Clair in Next Best Thing, and seven different characters in the black comedy The Steve Promise Story.

McNair is a voice over artist who can be heard on numerous radio and television adverts.

He returned to Neighbours, once again playing Malcolm for short stints in 2002 and 2004. In mid-2005 he made another return to Neighbours as part of the series' 20th anniversary episode. On 9 May 2011, it was announced that McNair would be returning to Neighbours in July 2011 for a four-month guest stint.

== Filmography ==
=== Television ===
Year	Title	Role	Type
1992	G.P.	Morgan	TV series, 1 episode
1993	Home and Away	Alan	TV series, 2 episodes
1994–97; 2002; 2004; 2005; 2011; 2023	Neighbours	Malcolm Kennedy	TV series, 267 episodes
1999	All Saints	Greg Morris	TV series, 1 episode
2000; 2002; 2005	Blue Heelers	Aaron Bridges / Clint Billings / Craig Simpson	TV series, 4 episodes
2001	Something in the Air	Ron Thomas	TV series, 2 episodes
2001	The Secret Life of Us	Joseph	TV movie & TV series, season 1, 5 episodes
2002	Marshall Law	Tarpey	TV miniseries, 1 episode
2004	Stingers	David Hartley	TV series, 1 episode
2004	Wicked Science	Earl Hanley	TV series, 1 episode
2005	Last Man Standing	Nurse Derek	TV series, 1 episode
2007	Satisfaction	Truckie	TV series, 1 episode
2008	McLeod's Daughters	Tim Dolan	TV series, 1 episode
2010	Sea Patrol	Richard Logan	TV series, 1 episode

=== Film ===
Year	Title	Role	Type
2004	Eavesdrop		Interactive feature film
2005	The Umbrella Men	Tommy	Short film

== Stage ==
Year	Title	Role	Venue
1997–98	Cinderella	Prince Charming	Christmas pantomime at Sunderland Empire Theatre, UK
1999	The Tempest	Ferdinand	Stafford Summer Festival, UK
1999–2000	Snow White and the Seven Dwarfs	The Prince	Christmas pantomime at Assembly Hall Theatre, Tunbridge Wells, UK
2002	Broken	Matt	Chapel Off Chapel for Melbourne Fringe Festival
	Next Best Thing	Casper St Clair	
2003	The Steve Promise Story	Steve & various (7) characters	The Store Room for Melbourne International Comedy Festival
2004; 2006	Blowback	Darko Reeves	St Kilda Army & Navy Club Memorial Hall, Melbourne with NYID, Sydney Opera House
2005	Dude, Where's My Hump?		Hunchbax Theatre Restaurant, Melbourne
