= Phoebe Bright =

- Neighbours character
- Portrayed by: Simone Robertson
- Duration: 1991–1993
- First appearance: 23 September 1991
- Last appearance: 15 September 1993
- Introduced by: Don Battye
In-universe information
- Occupation: Student (until 1992); Waitress (1993)
- Father: Arthur Bright
- Mother: Myrnah Bright
- Husband: Stephen Gottlieb (1993–)
- Daughters: Hope Gottlieb

Phoebe Gottlieb (also Bright) is a fictional character from the Australian soap opera Neighbours, played by Simone Robertson. She made her first screen appearance as Phoebe during the episode broadcast on 23 September 1991. Robertson joined the show on a five-week guest contract before joining the show's regular cast. Phoebe is characterised as a studious individual which earns her the title of the "school swat". To secure the role Robertson portrayed a geeky persona during her audition. The character is also noted for her liking of reptiles, particularly her pet snake. Writers developed the character further via her romantic storylines, most prominently with Todd Landers (Kristian Schmid) and later Stephen Gottlieb (Lochie Daddo). Throughout her two year duration, writers developed Phoebe from a bookish teenager into the show's tragic and tortured female character.

First her father dies and she is made homeless. She finds love with Todd until producers killed off the character and Phoebe is left grieving and pregnant with his child. She is later held hostage by Todd's father, Bob Landers (Bruce Kilpatrick) and gives birth to a daughter named Hope Gottlieb (Laura Pearson). Writers created a new relationship with Stephen and they marry and he becomes a co-parent to Hope all within the first few months of their storyline together. Writers tested their union when Stephen becomes paralysed and relies on Phoebe for support. She then became a victim to stalking from her obsessive housemate, Russell Butler (Stephen Whittaker). Producers decided to write Phoebe out of Neighbours following Daddo's decision to leave, with him complaining that his character was written entirely around Phoebe. She departed the show during the episode broadcast on 15 September 1993.

== Casting ==
Phoebe was originally created as a short-term character with Robertson hired for a five week guest role. Robertson was desperate to secure the role of Phoebe when the opportunity arose. She knew that Phoebe would be portrayed as being a "bit freaky" and decided play herself up to this persona. She attended the audition wearing thick glasses and her hair in pigtails. Two days later Robertson was informed that she had won the part. Producers soon asked Robertson to join the show's regular cast and she agreed. The role was expanded with writers planning romances for the character. Robertson told TV Week's Mark McGowan that "when I was offered the part, I knew right away I should do it." Robertson was aged fifteen when she began filming and she decided to carry on with her school work often with an on-set tutor and completed her final exams while filming. Robertson's father was also sceptical about her joining the cast because he believed it was not a viable career. Of joining the cast, Robertson stated "I love playing Phoebe - it's a fantastic role. So much happens to her I couldn't have wished for a better part."

== Development ==
=== Characterisation ===
"When Phoebe first appeared in Neighbours it was as a figure of fun. The school swot, she was called 'Creepy Phoebe' because of her passion for keeping pet reptiles, her favourite of which was Oscar the snake. But both Josh and then Todd fell for her and she blossomed."

— A description of Phoebe published on Neighbours.com

One of Phoebe's reptiles is a pet snake named Oscar. When Robertson auditioned for the role she was asked if she liked snakes. She pretended to like them to help gain the role. But she was later confronted with snake. She was required to have large snakes around her neck. Although the actual owner was onset in case of emergency. Off-screen the snake had to be replaced a number of times due to constant mishappenings. Robertson told Lisa Anthony from BIG! magazine that "we've had three different Oscars so far, the first one died, the second one got eaten by a snake - and that one died from indigestion!"

Writers immediately established Phoebe's on-screen persona during her guest character phase. Robertson told McGowan from TV Week that "Phoebe was a real nerd at first, but people liked her being different." Writers developed Phoebe further when Robertson was hired full-time and made her "come out of her shell" via her romantic relationships. Phoebe is also characterised as strong willed and she does not conform to the social normal in society. Robertson told Martyn Palmer from What's on TV that "I like her desire to be herself. In real life you have to make compromises and pretend to be someone you're not - especially for the public. That's just not Phoebe's personality." Robertson disliked Phoebe's quirky dress sense and style and dreaded what the wardrobe department would purchase for the character next. She added "she wears some awful clothes I wouldn't be seen dead in them outside work." Throughout her duration, writers made Phoebe prone to drama and used her for the show's main storylines. Robertson said that more happened to Phoebe in one week than people experience in a life time. She added "thank heavens my life's not so complicated."

Writers often portrayed the character mourning the deaths of those closest to her, such as her father Arthur Bright (Barry Hill). Phoebe's plight was difficult for Robertson to understand. Robertson told Mark McGowan from TV Week that she struggled because unlike Phoebe, she had not lost close family or been made homeless. She added that "Phoebe's a very emotional character. There's been lots of crying to do. Phoebe has had so much upset in her life."

=== Relationships with Josh Anderson and Todd Landers ===
For Phoebe's first romance, producers paired her with fellow teenager Josh Anderson (Jeremy Angerson). Phoebe begins to develop romantic feelings for Josh's best friend Todd Landers (Kristian Schmid). Phoebe decides to deal write her feelings down on a letter to Todd but does not intend to send it to him. Phoebe loses the letter and Josh finds it. She is shocked when he reveals that he has sent it to Todd. Phoebe scrambles to stop Josh and Todd from discovering the contents of her letter. Robertson defended Phoebe's deceit. She told a reporter from TVTimes that Phoebe falls in love which stops her from behaving sensibly.

Phoebe later begins a relationship with Todd and the pairing developed Phoebe into one of Neighbours' central characters. For Robertson the romance provided her with a challenge. She told an Inside Soap reporter that she was inexperienced and had never been in love. While creating the duo's scenes she had to use her imagination to make Phoebe appear "smitten by Todd". Schmid revealed that he had formed a close working relationship with Robertson through the storyline. He even had to correct inaccurate news stories they were romantically involved. In April 1992, a TV Week reporter announced that the couple would lose their virginity together. Todd then seventeen and Phoebe sixteen, the storyline was issue led and Schmid said that "Neighbours is a family show, but it’s also a realistic show." Robertson was unhappy with the scenes because she believed Neighbours did not promote safe sex and condoms. She told a Daily Mail reporter that "in these days of AIDS safe sex should be in every storyline."

Neighbours soon provided the actress with another challenging storyline. The character was sixteen years-old and discovers that she is pregnant with Todd's baby. Robertson stated "when she gets pregnant, there are all sorts of problems she has to face." She felt lucky that producers has given her such an "important role" and noted that "absolutely everything happens to this girl - there's never a dull moment in her life." When Phoebe tells Todd, he is left in "shock and dismay" and even "backs off". This prompts Phoebe to make it clear she can cope alone. Then the pair have to decide whether or not to keep the baby. Schmid believed the couple should keep the baby and told Chris Twomey from What's on TV that Todd would make a good father because he is responsible. But Schmid had quit Neighbours and writers planned for Todd to leave Phoebe to live with his mother. He felt it was unrealistic and requested that his character be killed off.

In the build up to his final scenes; Todd rushes to prevent Phoebe from having an abortion but is hit by a van and dies. Phoebe decides to keep the baby. Robertson told an Inside Soap reporter that "they decide to have an abortion, but they're both having second thoughts. Just as Phoebe is about to go under the knife, Jim calls the hospital to say that Todd has been run down, so Phoebe rushes to his bedside." After seeing Todd lay in his hospital bed, Phoebe decides that she cannot have an abortion. Robertson believed that Todd's death scenes were the hardest to film. The atmosphere was so tense that they kept laughing in between takes. Todd returns soon after as a ghost to inform Phoebe that she will give birth to a girl. Todd's death leaves Phoebe struggling by herself. Robertson stated that she's mostly scared and really doesn't know what to do. She's got no family since her father died." She began to share more screentime with Dorothy Burke (Maggie Dence) who decides to take Phoebe in and help out. Further characterisation was developed as Phoebe chooses to behave responsibly and remains focused on her education. She accepts that she must move on from Todd but still reminisces about their relationship during turmoil.

In one of her most memorable moments, Todd's father Bob Landers (Bruce Kilpatrick) holds Phoebe hostage. He wields a gun at a shocked Phoebe, who did not expect to ever share an encounter with Bob. Robertson told TV Week's McGowan that Bob wants to secure Phoebe's inheritance she received after her father died. Phoebe is rescued by Brad Willis (Scott Michaelson), but Bob shoots and injures Brad. Robertson concluded that it was "just another drama for Phoebe."

=== Teenage pregnancy ===
The storyline was controversial and had much shock value for the show's characters. The issue of teenage pregnancy being portrayed in Australian television during the 1990s was rare. Robertson relished the opportunity to portray an issue lead story. She told a reporter from TVTimes that "teenage pregnancy is an issue that most television shows don't dare tackle, despite its relevance to a young audience." The abortion issue also proved controversial in the industry. Robertson told Hilary Kingsley from that "it was a very moral storyline, a difficult one for the scriptwriters to write." Robertson believed that her generation were more willing to discuss the issue. After the scenes were broadcast, Robertson received many letters from teenagers requesting information about abortion. She stated that she was pro-abortion and politics and law should not prevent it.

Robertson was portraying a character two years her senior and portraying pregnancy proved difficult. She told McGowan from TV Week that "I can't possibly understand what it must be like for Phoebe." Robertson researched teenage pregnancy via magazine articles published at the time. She also sought advice from a member of the show's make-up department who was pregnant. Following the birth of Hope, Robertson struggled with scenes because she was not used to working with child actors. She also claimed that the storyline put her off having children of her own.

Robertson did not enjoy filming pregnancy scenes. She told Kingsley that she dreaded going into the wardrobe department to have special padded clothing fitted. During the initial stages of pregnancy she was given a thick waist to wear. Later came a large bra followed by a "huge padded stomach and bum". Deciding to keep her baby created even more stories surrounding the issue. After Todd's death Phoebe considers giving birth on his grave. She is met with opposition when fellow characters tell her it is a "ghoulish idea".

=== Marriage to Stephen Gottlieb ===
"Recent events in Phoebe's life have read like a very bad horror novel. First her father died, then she got pregnant at 17, agonised over having an abortion, but didn't because her boyfriend was killed. Then she was held hostage by a crazed gunman! But her life is about to change, and she's going to feel like a heroine in a Mills and Boone classic. And the hero in this romantic tale is newcomer [Stephen]."

— An Inside Soap profile on Phoebe's life. (1993)

The show cast Lochie Daddo as Phoebe's new love interest Stephen Gottlieb. Phoebe meets Stephen while she visits Todd's grave and he visits his dead lover, Libby's grave. He tracks her down to Ramsay Street where she attempts to put him off her by showing him her pet snake. Daddo told Shelli-Anne Couch from The Sydney Morning Herald that "It sort of turns into a little bit of a romance, starting very quickly".

Robertson believed that Phoebe was really guilty about meeting Stephen. She explained that "[Phoebe] tells the new guy to keep away, but then she thinks that Todd would be happy for her and the baby." Stephen becomes a "knight in shining armour" figure in Phoebe's life - always there to help her through the strain of her pregnancy. Daddo told Lisa Anthony from BIG! magazine that "his past opens his eyes to everything not being perfect and not lasting forever. He looks at things in a lighter way and that helps Phoebe." Stephen had an unsettled childhood with hippy parents, so Phoebe and a baby really appeals to him. But Daddo thought that the storyline was unbelievable because "they meet, get married and have a baby in the space of about two months."

Having only known her for six weeks, Stephen proposes to Phoebe at her 18th birthday party. Phoebe feels guilty about her new relationship. She attempts to contact Todd via the use of mediumship and he tells her to move on. Robertson also believed the story developed to rapidly. She told a writer from Inside Soap that she did not believe Phoebe loved Stephen when they agree to marry. Phoebe "wasn't even interested in him at first" but she respected Stephen's perseverance. Robertson added that because Phoebe lost her father and Stephen is older, she views him as a "bit of a father figure". Daddo found Stephen's eagerness to settle down with Phoebe strange. He told McGowan (TV Week) that Stephen views marriage as an "important institution" and Phoebe is "the right person" for him. Stephen also views Phoebe as a "challenge" because she is still grieving for Todd and reluctant to date him. Daddo believed Stephen had old-fashioned views about marriage and explained that "Stephen found something about this girl which he hadn't found before in someone else. It was instant attraction. He wants to spend the rest of his life with her."

Phoebe goes into premature labour the night before their wedding. She gives birth to a baby girl, Hope Gottlieb (Laura Pearson), who is rushed to hospital. Daddo told a TVTimes reporter that "it's a real crisis" for the characters because Hope is two months premature. Hope develops breathing problems and is placed into an incubator. Stephen informs Phoebe that there is a possibility that Hope will die. Robertson only had to film labour scenes and not the actual birth. She watched a series of birthing videos to help her portray labour correctly. Robertson tried so hard acting out the labour contractions that she nearly fainted on the set. She told Hilary Kingsley (Daily Mail) that "just acting it, breathing heavily through the contractions, made me feel faint." Phoebe and Hope's story was made authentic with the casting of Pearson, who herself was born premature. The show's casting department were auditioning new-born babies to play Hope when an on-set tutor, Kath, put Pearson forward. Kath's sister-in-law Sharon Pearson had given birth to Laura two weeks prematurely. Unlike Hope, Laura was a healthy baby and Kath suggested that she play the role. Pearson was eleven days old when she was used in Hope's birth scenes.

Eleven days after the cancellation of their first wedding, the duo marry. With their original venue cancelled, Benito (George Spartels) and Cathy Alessi (Elspeth Ballantyne) allow them to get married in their back garden. Writers introduced doubt into the proceedings when nurse Pam Willis (Sue Jones) interrupts their vows. Phoebe fears that Pam has brought her bad news, but is delighted to find she has brought Hope home from hospital. With her family complete the pair finally marry. The Neighbours production team enlisted Jocelyn Creed to design Phoebe's wedding dress. She told a TVTimes reporter that she worked hard to make Phoebe's dress "really special". It took more than four weeks to complete and she dressed the character's hair with pearls to match.

An explosion at the local pub, The Waterhole occurs due to a gas leak. Stephen is caught in the blast and is left paralysed. Stephen feels like a burden to Phoebe and breaks-up with her. Daddo told Mary Fletcher writing for Woman's Own that Stephen is attempting to "spare Phoebe" from being burdened with "a lifetime of looking after him." Stephen also believes that Phoebe is already preoccupied looking after baby Hope. Stephen's personality completely changes and he tells Phoebe he would rather go into rehabilitation than have her care for him. Phoebe is exhausted trying to care for Hope and visit Stephen. Robertson told a TVTimes writer that despite this she still wants to help. She explained "she's desperate to give Stephen some of the love he gave her when he married her. But she's having it thrown back in her face." She branded Stephen "cruel" and "selfish" despite his belief he is being "selfless". Stephen fails to accept that they can have care assistance workers in their home. Robertson concluded that "the truth is they both need each other." Stephen later reconsiders after he accepts his diagnosis. While interviewed by Erica Goatly of Woman, Daddo said "they get back together and have a wonderful Neighbours happy ending."

=== Russell Butler ===
Next Neighbours devised a "cuckoo in the nest" storyline for Phoebe and was created to disrupt her marriage. Following their wedding, Phoebe and Stephen begin to struggle financially. They reluctantly advertise for a lodger and Russell Butler (Stephen Whittaker) moves in. Despite being well mannered they soon witness odd behaviour from Russell. Phoebe is more nervous about his presence and becomes suspicious of him. Daddo told a reporter from Inside Soap that "he just seems to be able to do everything and something about the guy just doesn't add up." This prompts Phoebe to search his room but is caught by Russel and he "completely freaks out" on her. The confrontation sees Stephen attempting to evict Russell, who he is reluctant to leave, forcing the Gottlieb's to "live in terror". They discover that Russell has been released from a mental institution following the death of his wife and daughter. Daddo explained that "he's after Phoebe and Hope as replacements for his own family." The storyline then becomes more dramatic as Russell develops a "crush" on Phoebe. He then gets her alone, kisses her and Phoebe realises that she is in "serious trouble".

Whittaker told Mary Fletcher of Woman's Own that "he wants to get rid of Stephen, endear himself to Phoebe and take over as Hope's dad." So Russel is "quite shocked" when Phoebe does not respond to his advances. The actor believed that Russell had lost all sense of reality and following the shun becomes "threatening and manipulative" and "Phoebe is left not knowing what to do next". Russel's behaviour became a problem for Whittaker because fans began shouting, hitting him with umbrellas and warning him to leave Phoebe alone. An Inside Soap journalist later revealed that Russell would carry out a threat to steal hope. The incident leaves Phoebe with "nerves on red alert" and "struck dumb with fear". She is too scared of Russell to protect Hope and lets him snatch her. Stephen and Lou Carpenter (Tom Oliver) decide to get revenge by paying a bike gang to attack Russell. However their plan fails and Wayne Duncan (Jonathan Sammy-Lee) is left for dead as they mistake his identity.

=== Departure ===
In August 1993, columnists from Shout and Inside Soap reported that both Robertson and Daddo were leaving their roles. Unlike Stephen, Simone's character had been axed from Neighbours. Robertson had attended a meeting with a female producer who informed her that Phoebe was being written out of the series. Recalling her shock, Robertson told a writer from The Herald that "I just sort of sat there but the producer seemed really upset. She said 'oh, you guys I feel so bad.' So I started comforting her. Saying 'no everything's fine, don't be upset." Daddo's departure however was influenced by disappointment of storylines. Chrissie Camp of TV Week reported that "industry sources" believed Daddo was "wasted" being paired with Robertson's heavily pregnant character. Daddo told Camp that he was unaware that his character would be entirely written around Phoebe. He added "his whole thing revolved around Phoebe and the baby - even now it's like that. They never gave him the chance to be on his own." The following year, Daddo revealed that he became "frustrated" with Stephen being nothing more than Phoebe's husband. Robertson believed that any character she played following her departure was "bound to be a whole lot luckier than Phoebe".

Their departure story saw Phoebe and Stephen receive compensation from his accident. They decide to use the money to move to Anson's Corner to open a record store. Twenty-seven years after their departure from the series, Mark Gottlieb (Bruce Samazan) was reintroduced into the show. In his return scenes he reveals that Phoebe and Stephen are still together, have five children and now live in Nambucca Heads.

== Storylines ==
Phoebe appears at Erinsborough High School but her alternative personality makes her unpopular with fellow students. Josh loses a bet with friends and is forced to ask Phoebe on a date. But she is upset to learn the truth and is forced to work with him on a school play. Josh then becomes attracted to her and they start dating. They are soon confronted with Phoebe's disapproving father, Arthur. When Phoebe sternly defends their relationship Arthur suffers a heart attack. She decides to be more open about her relationship and Arthur agrees to let them be together. But while Josh is away from Ramsay Street she develops feelings for Todd who reciprocates. Josh is angry by the betrayal but eventually forgives his friends.

Arthur dies following a stroke and Phoebe's headmistress, Dorothy takes her in. Phoebe and Todd decide to consummate their relationship without using contraception and Phoebe becomes pregnant. She wants to have an abortion and Todd supports her decision, but when Phoebe goes to the abortion clinic, he changes his mind. He rushes to the clinic and is knocked down by a van. He is taken to hospital and Phoebe hears about his accident and does not have an abortion. Todd dies and later Phoebe has visions of him in which he tells her he will always be there for her and his daughter.

When Phoebe visits Todd's grave, she meets Stephen. They form a bond and fall in love. Phoebe is surprised when Stephen proposes to her, but she accepts. Phoebe goes into labour and Stephen delivers the baby girl. Phoebe names her daughter, Hope. Stephen and Phoebe marry a few weeks later. Dorothy leaves Phoebe and Stephen to their new home and they decide to run the coffee shop. They take in a problematic lodger Russell. He tries to kiss Phoebe, harasses her and steals Hope . Stephen uses a bike gang to scare Russell away from Ramsay Street. Stephen is paralysed in an explosion and the pair have to save their relationship. They then decide to open their own record store in Anson's Corner and leave Erinsborough. Stephen's brother Mark reveals that Phoebe and Stephen have five children upon his return to Erinsborough.

== Reception ==
A writer for the BBC described Phoebe's most notable moment as "being held hostage at number 30 by Bob Landers." A columnist from Inside Soap wrote "Simone plays the freakiest girl in school, an oddball who doesn't worry about looks and fashion, has weird ideas and even keeps a snake as a pet. Romance is last on her list of priorities." While their colleague stated "Neighbours teen lovers Todd and Phoebe thought that nothing could come between them. They knew that their love was strong enough to see them through any crisis - even a completely unplanned pregnancy." Ben Thompson of The Independent opined that the "schoolgirl mother" caused the "most outrageous moment" of 1993 when she fought for the right to give birth on Todd's tombstone.

Hilary Kingsley from Woman branded her "funny Phoebe - funny glasses, funny hairstyle, funny undertaker father and funny-peculiar pet." She added that the character evolved into three stages being funny Phoebe, fateful Phoebe and fulfilled Phoebe. Kingsley also noted that "by rights [Robertson] should be punch-drunk from playing more emotion-packed scenes than any other young character since the long-running Aussie soap opera began." Robin Oliver of The Sydney Morning Herald used Phoebe coming to terms with her pregnancy as an example of Neighbours becoming more "moralistic". A reporter from TVTimes branded Phoebe "the freaky girl who keeps a snake for a pet". They added that the character's teenage pregnancy was a "hard hitting story". Another branded her the "freakiest in school", adding "with her odd ideas and even stranger hobbies [...] Phoebe has caused something of a stir in Ramsay Street." An Evening Express journalist included Phoebe giving birth to Hope in their "Highlights" feature profiling the day's must watch television shows. Referencing Phoebe's endless dramas, a Daily Mirror reporter stated "you have to hand it to Neighbours' Phoebe - the girl's got stamina." They added "It seems only yesterday she was a gawky, bespectacled schoolgirl with a pet snake, a peculiar undertaker father and a crush on classmate Todd." Donna Hay from What's on TV included Phoebe and Todd in their "marriages made in heaven" feature. Hay noted that Todd only wanted "Bright the Fright" once Josh was interested in her. She added that their romance "should have had a happy ending" but writers decided otherwise. In May 1993, TVTimes featured a story about their readers' beliefs that there was too much sex on television. In their soap opera feature, they stated "many people worry about sex in early-evening soaps." They included a viewer complaint that "young kids" in Neighbours, such as Phoebe and Todd having sex was "bad". In 2024, Peter Hart from OK! assessed that the character was "the Neighbours school swot", adding that "in just two years, Phoebe turned from a bookish schoolgirl into a tortured teen."
