= Mark Gottlieb (Neighbours) =

- Neighbours character
- Portrayed by: Bruce Samazan
- Duration: 1993–1995, 2020
- First appearance: 13 August 1993
- Last appearance: 16 March 2020
- Introduced by: Alan Coleman (1993); Jason Herbison (2020)
In-universe information
- Other names: Marcel Amadieu
- Occupation: Head chef at Lassiter's Hotel; Owner of The Holy Roll
- Father: Dave Gottlieb
- Mother: Sally Dawes
- Brothers: Stephen Gottlieb
- Sisters: Serendipity Gottlieb
- Wife: Lucy Robinson (2020–)
- Stepdaughters: Annie Robinson-Pappas

Mark Gottlieb is a fictional character from the Australian soap opera Neighbours, acted by Bruce Samazan. Samazan hoped the role would help him further his aspirations to become a popular Australian actor. He relocated from Sydney to Melbourne for filming and signed a six-month contract, which he then required to extend. He made his first screen appearance during the episode broadcast on 13 August 1993. Mark was introduced as the brother of established regular Stephen Gottlieb (Lochie Daddo). The role initially required Samazan to put on a French accent, which he based on his own father's. In order to distinguish Mark from his E Street character Max Simmons, Samazan got a Caesar cut and Mark had a trendy European wardrobe.

Mark is a chef, and was portrayed as being "down-to-earth" and keen to settle down. He attracts the attentions of several female characters, but producers established a romantic relationship between him and Annalise Hartman (Kimberley Davies), which resulted in their engagement. During their wedding, Mark announces that he wants to dedicate his life to God and become a priest. Samazan believed the storyline gave both Mark and Annalise longevity. Mark's religious beliefs annoy his friends and neighbours, and Samazan described Mark as "pretty fanatical". The storyline led to Samazan's departure, as he felt the producers wanted to take his character in a different direction than he wanted. Mark's exit aired on 29 November 1995, as he leaves Erinsborough to pursue a career as a TV chef. Samazan reprised the role for the show's 35th anniversary celebrations, and his return scenes aired on 26 February 2020.

== Casting ==
Actor Bruce Samazan joined the cast of Neighbours as Mark, shortly after the cancellation of rival soap E Street in which he starred as Max Simmons. Samazan told Shelli-Anne Couch of The Sydney Morning Herald that he hoped a stint on Neighbours would help him further his aspirations of becoming a popular Australian actor. Samazan initially signed a six-month contract, but he wanted to extend it to make it a year and then decide whether he would continue in the role or look for a new acting job. Joining Neighbours meant Samazan had to relocate to Melbourne from Sydney for filming.

Speaking to Brett Thomas from The Sun-Herald, Samazan admitted that he was "a little bit rusty" because he had not worked for two months after E Street, but thought it was a good thing as the nerves helped him to get his lines right. He continued, "That's the best way to get rid of cobwebs. I'm almost nervous and that makes for a better performance because you're really thinking – you're thinking all the time. It makes it more of a challenge when you've got to adjust to a new situation." Samazan made his debut screen appearance on 13 August 1993.

== Development ==
=== Introduction and characterisation ===
Upon his introduction, Mark assumes a French persona as part of a ruse. Samazan had to act with a French accent that he developed with the help of real life experiences. He told Thomas, "A lot of the accent is from just listening to my father – he has such a rich French accent, even after 15 years of living here and people still have trouble understanding him. So I know how a Frenchman is going to say an English word." It is not long before Mark's real identity is revealed and it emerges that he has come to Erinsborough to reconcile with his brother Stephen Gottlieb (Lochie Daddo). The brothers had fallen out when Mark spiked Stephen's drink, so he was incapable of driving himself and his fiancée Libby home. Libby took a taxi instead, but it crashed and Libby was killed. Stephen blamed Mark for causing Libby's death. While talking about their days living with their parents in a hippy commune, where Mark was called Cosmic, the brothers realise that they have lots in common and finally reconcile.

Samazan had to change his appearance for the role to distinguish Mark from his E Street character. Mark wore "a trendy and expensive European wardrobe" and a Caesar cut, which initially shocked Samazan. He called the look "very old European", but pointed out the short hair was appropriate for Mark's job as a chef. Thomas thought Samazan might have been reluctant to change his look and the actor admitted that it had to be done, as he did not want viewers to confuse Mark with Max. An Inside Soap columnist described Mark as being "down-to-earth" and keen to settle down. He resented his parents for his upbringing and their "backwards ways". After moving into Number 30 Ramsay Street, Mark took over the lease of the Coffee Shop and ran a successful business.

=== Relationship with Annalise Hartman ===
Mark finds himself torn between two women – Gaby Willis (Rachel Blakely) and Annalise Hartman (Kimberley Davies). Mark feels that he has a lot to offer Annalise and that is why he chooses her over Gaby, who is looking for a long-term relationship. Mark sees past Annalise's flirty persona and falls in love with her. Samazan said Mark loved the attention he got from both women, especially when they argued over him. He also told Mary Fletcher from Woman's Own, "It was great for Mark's ego – and it didn't do mine any harm either!" Mark comforts Annalise when her affair with her boss ends and they grow closer when Mark learns more about Annalise's upbringing. Samazan explained, "Her own mother was a gold-digger who brought her up to think of men as paycheques. When Mark finds out, he starts to think differently about her and they end up setting up home together." Samazan added that because Neighbours was a family show, there would not be any actual sex scenes between Mark and Annalise, but he thought the audience would know what the couple were up to by their various displays of affection and comments.

Despite his relationship with Annalise, Mark continues to attract admirers. First, teenager Danni Stark (Eliza Szonert) develops a crush on Mark and then charity fundraiser Katerina Torelli (Josephine Mitchell) spots Mark out driving with Annalise and also develops a crush on him. Mark and Katerina flirt with each other and Katerina dedicates songs to him on radio, which makes Annalise jealous. While Annalise is away, Mark kisses Katerina. When Annalise finds out what happened, she is shocked that Mark cheated on her, but they stay together. The couple argue more, as Mark becomes broody and wants to settle down, but Annalise does not feel the same way. Samazan thought that Mark was looking for stability in his life, following his upbringing with his hippy parents. He also believed that Mark's mother's death "hit him very hard" and it made him think more about where his life and relationship with Annalise is heading.

A few months later, Mark proposes to Annalise and she accepts. In the lead up to the wedding, Annalise pressures Mark to be baptised and attend church services. As a result, Mark realises that he wants "bigger and better things" and falls in love with religion. During the wedding, Mark suddenly announces to a devastated Annalise that he wants to dedicate his life to God and become a priest. Samazan told Arnold that he was happy to get the scripts for the storyline, as it meant that there would be more to come from Mark and Annalise's relationship. He said, "When I realised there was going to be a bit more longevity for both our characters I was thrilled. I was worried that Mark and Annalise would get written into a corner but there's lots of juicy stuff to come."

=== Religious views ===
As the character's "religious fervour" grows more intense, his more secular neighbours are shown to be annoyed by it. Mark's behaviour causes trouble for his sister, Serendipity Gottlieb (Raelee Hill), and he manages to alienate his friends when he tries to dictate how they should lead their lives. Samazan described Mark as "pretty fanatical" and thought he should be talking to his friends, instead of ramming his beliefs down their throats. Mark vows to be celibate, but this is tested by his attraction to Lucy Robinson (Melissa Bell). Following "a series of narrow escapes", Mark starts to have delusions of immortality. When he comes away from a collision with a car without injury, he is convinced it is a sign from God. However, when Lucy leaves town, this causes Mark to have an emotional breakdown and he throws himself further into his religious preaching, which sees him become an outcast.

Samazan said "He has a very close brush with death and thinks he's invincible. But he's been through some tough times – there was his mum's death, jilting Annalise and seeing her get together with Sam, and then to top it all Lucy left him just as he finally fell for her." The character's faith is tested when he starts to feel shut out and he sees Annalise moving on with someone else. The storyline comes to a conclusion when Mark falls from a ladder and ends up in a coma. As Mark lies in his hospital bed, Serendipity becomes "increasingly distraught" as it seems that no one else cares about her brother. As he wakes up from his coma, Mark comes to his senses and works hard to win his friends back.

=== Departure and return ===
The character's religious storyline led to Samazan's departure from the serial, as he felt the producers wanted to take Mark in a different direction than he wanted. He said, "I wasn't happy with Mark's character anymore, he had run his course. I don't think I'd ever go back to doing a soap – except E Street that is." Samazan departed Neighbours in 1995, along with several other cast members. On-screen, Mark makes an appearance on a cooking show, which leads to a job offer in Sydney. He decides to leave Erinsborough to pursue his new career as a TV chef.

On 24 November 2019, Neighbours confirmed that Samazan had reprised the role for the serial's 35th anniversary celebrations. His scenes began airing from 26 February 2020. Samazan thought the opportunity to return for "an amazing milestone was a no brainer." He told Maddison Hockey of TV Week that he had been asked to return before, but the timing this time worked out perfectly and he felt honoured to be involved in the 35th anniversary. Samazan was also pleased to have the chance to work with former Neighbours and E Street co-star Melissa Bell again.

== Storylines ==
After arriving in Erinsborough, Mark assumes the identity of Marcel Amadieu and poses as a French chef to get a job at Lassister's Hotel. Annalise Hartman soon uncovers the ruse and Mark asks her to keep quiet, explaining that he has come to reconcile with his brother Stephen. Mark spiked Stephen's drink during a party, leaving him unable to drive his fiancée, Libby, home. Libby took a taxi, which crashed and killed her. Stephen blames Mark for the accident. When Mark visits Stephen at his home in Ramsay Street, he is shocked to find him in a wheelchair following an explosion at the local pub. Stephen suffers a relapse triggered by Mark's arrival. Mark wants to make amends, but Stephen's wife, Phoebe (Simone Robertson) and friend Wayne Duncan (Jonathon Sammy-Lee) want him to stay away from Stephen. Mark perseveres and eventually Stephen forgives him.

After Stephen and Phoebe move to Ansons Corner, Mark moves into the house with Beth Brennan (Natalie Imbruglia). Several local women develop crushes on Mark, including Annalise, Gaby Willis and Lucy Robinson. Mark pursues Annalise and woos her with grand gestures. Mark and Annalise soon begin dating and their relationship is fraught with many arguments. Mark receives a letter from his mother, Sally (Jane Little; Helen Rollinson), who is dying of cancer and he finds this hard to take as he has not seen her or his father in a number of years. Mark visits the hippy commune where he and his siblings were raised and clashes with his father, Dave (David Murray; Ivar Kants), but soon relents and makes his peace with Sally on her deathbed. Annalise also attends and things between her and Mark are strengthened.

Mark proposes to Annalise and she accepts, but on the day of the wedding, he jilts her and decides he wants to become a priest. This decision hurts Annalise and soon Mark begins alienating his friends when he becomes serious about his new life path and becomes sanctimonious. Mark struggles with his feelings for Annalise, and later tells her he will become a lay preacher, so they can still marry and he can devote his life to the church. Annalise realises that she no longer loves Mark and he leaves to do some charity work. On his return, Mark finds Lucy Robinson working as a go-go dancer at a nightclub. He learns that her marriage and modelling career have both ended, so he persuades her to go and see her family. Mark is attracted to Lucy and he helps her overcome an alcohol problem with counselling. During this time, he buys the lease to the coffee shop from Annalise and renames it The Holy Roll.

Mark is impressed with Lucy when she gives a talk about addiction at a youth centre, and they have dinner together. Mark and Lucy have sex, and he is tempted to forgo joining the priesthood to be with her. However, Lucy tells him that she needs to leave Erinsborough and she takes a job in New York. Lucy's departure sends Mark into a depression. After coming away from three minor accidents and a collision with a car unscathed, Mark feels that he is immortal. He alienates himself when his friends and neighbours become fed up of his lectures. When Mark slips and falls while cleaning Lou Carpenter's (Tom Oliver) gutters, he is left comatose for several weeks. He eventually regains consciousness, much to the relief of his sister, Serendipity Gottlieb who has been by his bedside. Mark suffers memory loss, but soon has flashbacks to his pious behaviour and realises he had become unlikeable.

Shortly after being released from hospital, Mark briefly dates Annalise's half-sister Joanna Hartman (Emma Harrison), but he feels things are too weird as he was engaged to Annalise the previous year. After realising that being a chef is what he wants to do with his life, Mark sells The Holy Roll. He is then offered a job on the popular television show Healthy, Wealthy and Wise. Mark proves to be a natural in front of the camera and a rival show offers him a hosting job, which is based in Sydney. After encouragement from his house mate Cody Willis (Peta Brady), Mark accepts the job and he has one final breakfast at Number 30, before leaving for Sydney.

Mark returns to Erinsborough twenty-five years later to meet with Jack Callahan (Andrew Morley), who is conflicted about whether to return to the priesthood. Mark meets Lucy Robinson, who is also in town for the Lassiters wedding expo, and they reconnect over their shared history. Mark extends his stay and they eventually rekindle their relationship, despite Lucy's concerns about Mark's commitment to his faith. When Mark learns that Lucy has to return to the United States for work, he decides to propose to her and move to New York, so they can be together. Mark and Lucy have a ceremonial wedding on the first day of the expo, before leaving for New York, so Mark can meet Lucy's daughter, followed by a visit to Las Vegas for Lucy's job, and eventually Paris for their honeymoon.

== Reception ==
For his portrayal of Mark, Samazan earned a nomination for Most Popular Actor at the 1st National Television Awards. A writer for the BBC's Neighbours website said Mark's most notable moment was "Calling off his wedding to become a priest." Matthew Clifton, writing for entertainment website Heckler Spray included Mark in his list of "The Best Ever Mid-90s Neighbours Characters." Of Mark, Clifton said "Joined the soap pretending to be a French chef to get a job at the coffee shop, Marcel Amadeu 'a votre service'. Mark had a religious conversion after nearly been killed by a kitchen knife accident, and in the end jilted strumpet Annalise to become a priest. He also changed the name of the café to The Holy Roll".

During a feature on Neighbours actors turned pop stars Iain Hepburn of the Daily Record did not remember Samazan's character, saying "Bruce played Mark Gottlieb – no, we didn't immediately remember him either." Tony Squires from The Sydney Morning Herald disliked Mark's hair during his time on the show, asking him to "get rid of the Caesar haircut" and branding it "unfortunate". A Daily Mirror reporter called the character "hunky". While an Inside Soap writer quipped that Mark was "Ramsay Street's unlikely heart-throb".

A columnist for All About Soap placed Annalise and Mark's wedding at number eight on their twenty greatest soap weddings list. They said "Annalise looked more likely to make a priest renounce his vows than drive a man into the arms of the church, but that's exactly what happened when Mark ditched Neighbours' hottest babe at the altar to devote his life to God. Strange but true..." Inside Soap ran a feature compiling "The 100 greatest soap stories ever told". They featured Mark's story about finding God as their 55th choice.
