= Bouncer (Neighbours) =

Fictional dog in Neighbours (Australian TV series)

- Neighbours character
- Portrayed by: Bouncer
- Duration: 1987–1993
- First appearance: 4 February 1987
- Last appearance: 12 February 1993
- Introduced by: Reg Watson
- Species: Dog
- Breed: Labrador Retriever
In-universe information
- Owners: Lucy Robinson; Mike Young; Nell Mangel; Joe Mangel; Toby Mangel; Dorothy Burke
- Other relatives: Bouncer 2

Bouncer is a Labrador Retriever featured on the Australian soap opera Neighbours. He made his first screen appearance during the episode broadcast on 4 February 1987 and he exited the series on 12 February 1993 after six years. He was played by Bouncer throughout his duration on the show and he was trained by Luke Hura.

== Casting and development ==
When Neighbours needed a golden Labrador puppy, they turned to animal trainer Luke Hura and his canine actors agency, who provided them with Bouncer. Hura owned Bouncer, who was a puppy when he joined the show. Hura said that he taught Bouncer to understand 70 commands, stating: "He may have looked as if he was just doing what dogs do naturally, but everything Bouncer did in front of the camera was 'acting'." Hura said Bouncer "loved every minute" of his time in Neighbours and often couldn't wait to get in the car and go to the studio. As Bouncer became more of a regular on the show, Hura had to relocate from Adelaide to Melbourne to accommodate his filming schedule. Bouncer was paid more than the human actors and Hura revealed that he was worth between $100,000 and $200,000. When he made personal appearances, he travelled in a stretch limo.

Bouncer is introduced when Mike Young (Guy Pearce) buys him as a present for young Lucy Robinson (Kylie Flinker). In 1989, Pearce asked producers not to put him in scenes with Bouncer, as he did not like dogs. He said Bouncer was a "great dog", but he could not go on working closely with him, adding "I had to tell them to take him away from me. You won't see Mike patting Bouncer again." On-screen, Bouncer ends up in the care of Mrs Mangel (Vivean Gray), and later her son and grandson Toby Mangel (Ben Geurens).

During Bouncer's time on Neighbours he lived at three addresses, survived road accidents, being lost, a house fire and being poisoned by some mushrooms. Bouncer's fan cards became the most popular out of any cast member. One of Bouncer's most famous storylines saw him dreaming that he was marrying Rosie, Clarrie McLachlan's (Frederick Parslow) Border Collie, who lived next door. During an interview, Anne Charleston (who played Madge Bishop) said "The whole cast was mortified about that! It reduced it to a three-year-old's programme. It was very strange."

Bouncer leaves Ramsay Street with Toby, before returning "exhausted and bleeding" for one final adventure. Thirteen weeks after finishing his final scenes on Neighbours, Bouncer died of cancer, aged seven. Of his death, Hura stated "I was very attached to him. I really miss him." Following his death, Bouncer was sent more tributes from fans around the world than any of the human cast.

In 2015, Neighbours paid homage to Bouncer during its 30th anniversary by introducing Bouncer 2, who Jason Herbison confirmed is "definitely a direct descendent (sic)" of the original Bouncer. Herbison explained that Bouncer 2 was the result of one of Bouncer's "few notable affairs when he was on the show". He called the dog's introduction a "nice nod to history".

== Storylines ==
When Mike Young fails to save Lucy Robinson's pet Terrier, Basil, from drowning, he goes to the local animal shelter and brings home Bouncer for her. Lucy is hurt and angry that Mike is seemingly trying to replace Basil and is initially reluctant to have anything to do with the new puppy. However, Bouncer soon wins her over and she grows to love him as much as Basil. When Lucy leaves Ramsay Street for a trip around Europe, she leaves Bouncer with Mike. Along with the rest of the Clarke household, Mike grows to love Bouncer so much, that when Lucy (now Sasha Close) returns she lets Bouncer stay with them. However, Bouncer finds new company in the form of lonely Mrs Mangel. Bouncer begins spending a lot of time in Mrs Mangel's house and she grew fond of him too. When Mike finds out, he and Mrs Mangel fight over who Bouncer should live with and they decide to let Bouncer choose for himself. He runs to Mrs Mangel and Mike lets Bouncer live with her. After Mrs Mangel marries and moves to England with her new husband, Bouncer is left with her son Joe Mangel (Mark Little). Bouncer misses Mrs Mangel at first, but he soon finds a new loving owner in Joe's son, Toby (Finn Greentree-Keane) and the two become inseparable. Bouncer becomes a hero of Ramsay Street when he saves Madge Bishop and Sky Bishop (Miranda Fryer) from a fire at the Mangel house by barking for help.

Bouncer moves next door with Toby and Dorothy Burke (Maggie Dence) when the Mangels move to the countryside. Dorothy and Phoebe Bright (Simone Robertson) enjoy having Bouncer live with them. When Toby and Dorothy decide to leave Ramsay Street to join the Mangels in the country, Toby knows he cannot leave Bouncer behind and takes him with them. But Bouncer misses the street and just days after leaving, Toby calls Jim Robinson (Alan Dale) to tell him that Bouncer has run away. The residents are sure that Bouncer is heading back to Ramsay Street and Hannah Martin (Rebecca Ritters) finds him and a litter of puppies that he had fathered in Anson's Corner. It was then arranged for the puppies to live at a farm in the country near Bouncer. Doug Willis (Terence Donovan) and Pam Willis (Sue Jones) pack their car with the puppies and drive them and Bouncer to the country.

In 2015, Naomi Canning (Morgana O'Reilly) finds a labrador and Chris Pappas (James Mason) learns that the dog's owner has recently died. Lucy (now Melissa Bell) soon discovers that the dog is Bouncer's direct descendant, so gives the dog to Paul Robinson (Stefan Dennis) and names her Bouncer 2.

== Reception ==
"During the course of an eventful six-year stint Bouncer lived at three different addresses, survived road accidents, fathered puppies, got lost, was poisoned by some exotic mushrooms; and somehow saved Madge from a chip pan fire."

— Daniel Bettridge of The Guardian describing Bouncer's duration. (2011)

Bouncer's dream sequence was named as one of Neighbours most memorable moments by The Times. The newspaper also added the storyline in which Bouncer saves Madge from a chip pan fire to their list of memorable moments. They said "One of those scenes you think you might have imagined, but no, Bouncer tenaciously calls the emergency services as an inferno engulfs the Mangels". In January 1992, Hilary Kingsley of the Daily Mirror named Bouncer "Dog Of The Week" for saving Madge. Kingsley wrote "Forget the Crufts's champion – it was Bouncer in Neighbours (again), brilliantly barking down the phone and into unconscious Madge's ear as the chip-pan caught fire."

Vicky Frost of The Guardian named Bouncer as one of the best TV dogs, and pet insurance company Petplan named him the tenth "Top TV Pet" and the ninth best "Male TV Pet". In 1989, Bouncer won the Best Performance by an Animal on Television accolade presented by the Australian children's magazine Eyespy.

The BBC said Bouncer's most notable moment was "Being nominated for a special bravery award by Toby Mangel." MSN TV editor Lorna Cooper also commented on Bouncer and his dream stating: "Neighbours featured some bizarre dream sequences: there was the Christmas edition with Mike Young and Shane Ramsay as Tweedle Dum and Tweedle Dee and the episode in which Harold Bishop fantasised about being a Scottish laird. But nothing has topped Bouncer the Labrador's dream that he was marrying Clarrie McLachlan's dog, Rosie. What were the writers thinking?" Bouncer's dream was later named the second "weirdest" storyline in the show's history.

Josephine Monroe commented positively of Bouncer in her book Neighbours: The First 10 Years, stating: "Bouncer was a hero – he even answered the phone and barked to Joe when baby Sky was in trouble – and often had major storylines of his own like the time he was run over and nearly died. But most importantly, he was a loyal and loved friend." She also branded him as one of the most loved characters in the serial's history. Celebrating the serial's twenty-fifth anniversary, British magazine NOW profiled their favourite characters, Bouncer was included and they branded his dream sequence as one of the serial's most memorable moments and citing his on-screen death as the main plotline for the year.

An Orange website writer branded Bouncer as "arguably the most famous dog in soap history" and describe his relationship with Joe as "touching". Doyouremember.co.uk, a website dedicated to 1980's culture, criticised the writers of Bouncer's dream stating: "Was the writer on LSD? Or maybe somebody slipped a magic mushroom into the lasagne at Lassiters." Daniel Bettridge of The Guardian said Bouncer, a "faithful golden retriever", was one of the best actors to "tread the Ramsay Street tarmac." He described Bouncer's dream as the "infamous episode dedicated to a doggy daydream where he married the saucepot sheepdog from next door. Woof." Digital Spy's Jack Klompus said that Bouncer "famously took the spotlight" during his dream sequence.

Andrew Williams of Metro said that Bouncer was a "photogenic" and "fun-loving labrador". He noted that while Bouncer "went on to save Madge from a chip pan fire, gave Mrs Mangel amnesia when he accidentally knocked her off a ladder and also fathered two litters of puppies with random neighbourhood bitches" - he was still best known for his "infamous dream". Readers of TV Magazine voted Bouncer their third "favourite ever soap dog" during a poll. He received 14% of the vote, behind Coronation Street's Schmeichel and EastEnders' Wellard. In 2022, Kate Randall from Heat included Bouncer in the magazine's top ten Neighbours characters of all time feature. Randall also named Bouncer "the most popular character by far". She added that the dog "survived getting lost, a chip-pan fire and a super-weird dream sequence." Also that year, a reporter from The Scotsman included Bouncer's dream as one of the show's top five moments from the show's entire history.

In 2022, Neighbours released official merchandise via Amazon. Cartoon versions of Bouncer were featured on two Christmas themed designs for T-Shirts.

== See also ==
- List of individual dogs
- List of fictional dogs
