= Stephen Gottlieb =

- Neighbours character
- Portrayed by: Lochie Daddo
- Duration: 1992–1993
- First appearance: 12 October 1992
- Last appearance: 15 September 1993
- Introduced by: Don Battye
In-universe information
- Occupation: Record store manager Cook and waiter Record store owner
- Father: Dave Gottlieb
- Mother: Sally Dawes
- Brothers: Mark Gottlieb
- Sisters: Serendipity Gottlieb
- Wife: Phoebe Bright (1993–)
- Adoptive daughters: Hope Gottlieb

Stephen Gottlieb is a fictional character from the Australian soap opera Neighbours, played by Lochie Daddo. He made his first screen appearance during the episode broadcast on 12 October 1992. Stephen is characterised as a compassionate record store manager. He was introduced into the series as a love interest of Phoebe Bright (Simone Robertson). Writers created a rushed romance between the pair. Phoebe was mourning her dead boyfriend Todd Landers (Kristian Schmid) and pregnant with his child. Despite this the characters were married and cohabiting after two months. Stephen and Phoebe's relationship dominated his main storylines. They included Phoebe's pregnancy dramas, her baby nearly dying and living in fear of their mentally ill lodger Russell Butler (Steven Whittaker).

Stephen's most prominent story was suffering paralysis after being caught up in a gas explosion. Stephen's rehabilitation is quick but provided more turmoil for him and Phoebe. Daddo soon decided to leave Neighbours because he was frustrated with his character's stories. He believed that Stephen was nothing more than Phoebe's love interest. His departure caused producers to write Robertson out of the show too. Their departure story depicts them moving away to open a record store with the compensation received from Stephen's accident.

== Casting ==
On 11 October 1992, Shelli-Anne Couch from The Sydney Morning Herald revealed that Daddo had joined the cast of Neighbours as Stephen Gottlieb, "a record store manager with an enormous amount of compassion." Daddo was initially signed until December, with an option to extend his contract for another six months. Of his casting, Daddo stated "It's something new for me. I'm just starting out on the acting side of things and I don't think there is a better place to learn. Like everyone says, I'd love to go from here and make films. But I'm not sure. I want to stay in the acting side and just see where it takes me. I really don't know what will happen, where I'll be. I'm just enjoying what I'm doing now." The actor made his first appearance as Stephen during the episode broadcast on 12 October 1992.

== Development ==
=== Marriage to Phoebe Bright ===
"Stephen sees marriage as a very important institution, he was engaged to a girl two years ago who died. When he met Phoebe, he discovered she was the right person for him. She was a challenge because she kept turning him away, as she was still grieving for Todd. Stephen found something about this girl which he hadn't found before in someone else. It was instant attraction. He wants to spend the rest of his life with her."

— Lochie Daddo on Stephen and Phoebe's romance. (1992)

While he was at the graveyard visiting his dead fiancée, Stephen noticed a pregnant Phoebe Bright (Simone Robertson) by the graveside of her ex-boyfriend, Todd (Kristian Schmid). They confided in each other and Stephen made Phoebe realise that Todd's spirit would be with her where ever she goes, after learning that she wanted to have her baby by his grave. Daddo commented that their meeting "sort of turns into a little bit of a romance." Stephen later visits Phoebe and she tries to put him off by showing him her pet snake, Oscar, but he states that he has one of his own. Couch revealed that Daddo did his own research for the snake scenes by visiting an animal farm outside Melbourne. Of Phoebe's reaction to meeting Stephen, Robertson explained "It's a really weird way to meet the man of your dreams, but at least something is about to go right for Phoebe. The main thing for me is that I really get on well with Lochie. As for Stephen, he works in a record shop and is so different from Todd. He's older – 23 – and calmer."

After five weeks of dating, Stephen proposed to Phoebe. Robertson thought the proposal was too fast, especially as Phoebe was not interested in Stephen at first and was still hung up on Todd. Daddo found Stephen's eagerness to settle down with Phoebe strange. He told McGowan (TV Week) that Stephen views marriage as an "important institution" and Phoebe is "the right person" for him. Stephen also views Phoebe's reluctance to date him as a "challenge". Daddo believed Stephen had old-fashioned views about marriage and explained that Stephen was instantly attracted to her. A BBC Online writer explained that "Stephen's hippy upbringing made him yearn for a traditional life and he saw in Phoebe, pregnant as she was, a ready-made family."

While Phoebe accepted the proposal, Robertson believed that she was not in love with Stephen. She told an Inside Soap writer "She was definitely falling for him, but I don't think she really ever loved. Phoebe had a lot of respect for him because he persevered with her for so long! And I think because he was older she saw him as a bit of a father figure, and as her father had died I guess that was quite appealing." After succumbing to Stephen's "easy charm", Phoebe planned an early wedding. While Stephen was out on his stag night, Phoebe went into labour two months early. Stephen rushed back to their house and helped deliver Phoebe's daughter, Hope (Laura Pearson). Hope developed breathing problems and it was left to Stephen to break the news to Phoebe that she might die. Stephen became worried that if Hope died, Phoebe would not want to marry him and his feelings of unease grew when everyone began talking about Todd. Stephen and Phoebe marry eleven days after their cancelled ceremony. Benito (George Spartels) and Cathy Alessi (Elspeth Ballantyne) offer the pair their back garden as they lost the original venue. Writers created tense scenes for the nuptials with nurse Pam Willis (Sue Jones) interrupting their vows. Phoebe rushes into the Alessi house believing Hope is in peril. She is relieved when she learns Pam has discharged Hope home from hospital and the wedding resumes.

=== Russell Butler ===
When Phoebe and Stephen suffered financial difficulties, they decided to take in lodger Russell Butler (Steven Whittaker). Daddo claimed that Stephen was initially "really cool" with Russell living with him, but then he started to get under his skin and "a whole new side" of Stephen emerged. Phoebe had a similar reaction and she was also nervous around Russell. Daddo said "he just seems to be able to do anything and the guy just doesn't add up." Phoebe became suspicious of Russell and decided to look around his room, but when Russell caught her he freaked out. At that point, Stephen wanted Russell to leave, but he was difficult to get rid of and the Gottliebs lived in fear of what he would do next. It eventually emerged that Russell had been released from an institution after he lost his wife and daughter. Daddo explained that Russell saw Phoebe and Hope as substitutions for his own family. Stephen formed a plan to get rid of Russell with Lou Carpenter (Tom Oliver). They paid a gang of bikers to attack Russell, but their plan went wrong when Wayne Duncan (Jonathan Sammy-Lee) was attacked and left for dead by mistake.

=== Paralysis ===
Stephen was paralysed when The Waterhole exploded due to a gas leak in the basement. During filming of the explosion, Daddo revealed that he was made up to look as if his forehead had caved in. Stephen lost all movement down one side of his body and was told that he would need to use a wheelchair. Daddo told Woman's Own writer Mary Fletcher that the storyline made him relive his own brother's accident, which left him requiring a wheelchair. Of Stephen's reaction to his condition, Daddo stated "When Stephen discovers he'll be in a wheelchair, he tries to spare Phoebe by ending it with her, saying he doesn't love her. But what he means is he loves her too much to burden her with a lifetime of looking after him."

Stephen's recovery is made difficult by his reluctance to accept any help. Robertson told a TVTimes reporter that Stephen is trying to be "selfless" but in the process he behaves "cruel" and "selfish". She explained that Stephen does not consider community nursing support as an option. He thinks that admitting himself into a rehabilitation centre is the best option for his wife. She added that "in rejecting Phoebe, he's cutting out one of the most important people in his life. The truth is, they both need each other."

Phoebe managed to convince Stephen that they belonged together and he because he loved her, they stayed together. Following rehabilitation, Stephen managed to regain the use of his legs. He eventually managed to walk without his wheelchair and made a full recovery. When the insurance money from the accident came through, Stephen decided that he wanted to use it open his own record store. Daddo revealed that Stephen being blown up in The Waterhole was his favourite storyline from his time on Neighbours.

=== Departure ===
In July 1993, Chrissie Camp from TV Week reported that Daddo had decided to quit Neighbours, after twelve months of playing Stephen. Camp revealed that Daddo would film his final scenes on 6 August, while his character would remain on-screen until October. Daddo stated that the decision was mutual between himself and producers, saying "They didn't know what to do with Stephen next and I thought a year in Neighbours was long enough for me." The actor told Camp that he had not expected to be given a character who, after only six weeks, was married with a child. He believed the development did not allow him any time to establish Stephen as a character on his own and he became frustrated. Daddo said "His whole thing revolved around Phoebe and the baby. Everything he did - even now, its like that. They never gave him a chance to be on his own." Stephen's exit storyline saw him and Phoebe leave Erinsborough to run a record shop in Anson's Corner.

Twenty-seven years after Stephen's departure from the series, his brother Mark Gottlieb (Bruce Samazan) was reintroduced into Neighbours. Writers used the character to update viewers on Stephen. Mark reveals that Stephen is still married to Phoebe and that they now live in Nambucca Heads with their five children.

== Storylines ==
Stephen was the eldest of three children born to Dave Gottlieb (David Murray; Ivar Kants) and Sally Dawes (Jane Little; Helen Rollinson) on a hippy commune. He was christened Freedom, but as they grew up, Stephen and his brother Mark rejected their parents' ways, while their younger sister, Serendipity (Raelee Hill) embraced them. When Stephen became the manager of a record store in Elliot Park, he proposed to long-time girlfriend, Libby and she accepted. One night at a party, Mark spiked Stephen's drink, leaving him unable to drive Libby home. Mark, also ended up too drunk to drive Libby himself, forcing her to take a cab. Libby died when the cab crashed and Stephen blamed Mark for her death. After Mark left for France to train as a chef, Stephen finally felt he could move on with his life.

Stephen first appears at the cemetery where he sees pregnant teenager Phoebe visiting the grave of her recently deceased lover, Todd Landers. The two begin to chat and they realize they have a lot in common as Stephen's fiancé, Libby had not long died in a car crash and is buried in the same cemetery as Todd. After spending a lot of time with Phoebe, Stephen begins to fall for her but he realises that she is still grieving for Todd. After several months of dating, Stephen propose to Phoebe on her 18th birthday and she accepts. The couple plan to marry before the baby is born, but on the eve of the wedding Phoebe goes into labour and Stephen delivers the baby girl in the living room at Number 30. Phoebe names her daughter Hope, after she is born prematurely.

When Phoebe wants to put Todd's surname, Landers on Hope's birth certificate, Stephen feels like Todd would always haunt them. After Helen Daniels (Anne Haddy), Todd's surrogate grandmother, explains that Todd would have been happy with Phoebe's choice of husband, Stephen is reassured. On the day of Stephen and Phoebe's wedding, local nurse Pam Willis (Sue Jones) brings them a healthy Hope in time for the ceremony. After Stephen loses his job at the record store after refusing to take bribes from record companies to falsify record sales, he and Phoebe are given a lifeline by Cathy Alessi (Elspeth Ballantyne) who puts them in charge of the Coffee Shop. They job share and take it in turns to look after Hope.

When the Gottliebs advertise for a tenant, Russell Butler spots the notice and takes it down so no one else will apply for the room. On the surface, Russell seems normal but as time goes on Stephen and Phoebe soon find out that Russell's behaviour is odd and he begins to drive a wedge between the couple by stirring up trouble. When Russell tries to kiss Phoebe one afternoon, she tells Stephen who demands Russell moves out. However, this is problematic as Russell intends to stay until the lease expires. After Stephen lashes out and punches Russell, he has him charged with assault and then pays Stephen rent at the last minute to avoid eviction. It is revealed that Russell had spent time in a mental institution after suffering a breakdown following his wife and baby leaving him, due to his drug use.

Fearful for his family's safety, Stephen sends Phoebe and Hope to stay with Phoebe's former guardian Dorothy Burke (Maggie Dence) in the country for several days. In desperation, Stephen then asks Lou Carpenter to have some heavies "persuade" Russell to leave. Unfortunately the plan backfires and Wayne Duncan is mistaken for Russell and badly beaten instead. Stephen and Lou apologise to Wayne, and Russell gets the message that he is not welcome in Ramsay Street. The Gottliebs have better luck with Beth Brennan (Natalie Imbruglia) as their next tenant as she is a friend.

When the local pub, The Waterhole explodes, Stephen is one of the casualties and is the first to be found in the wreckage. He wakes up in hospital and is disoriented and has no memory of Phoebe, who was keeping a bedside vigil. Stephen then has an operation to remove a blood clot on his brain and recovers and regains his memory. He is left paralysed and soon feels like a burden to Phoebe and decides to go to a rehabilitation centre but changes his mind at the last minute.

Stephen struggles to come to terms with being in a wheelchair and when his estranged brother, Mark arrives in Erisborough, he is less than happy to see him as he still blames him for Libby's death. After Mark's persistence to reconcile with his brother, Stephen finally accepts him. Stephen then undergoes a gruelling rehabilitation programme. During Helen's birthday party at the newly reopened Waterhole, Stephen surprises Phoebe by getting up out of his wheelchair and walks towards her unaided. Stephen reveals that Wayne has been helping him for weeks. Several days later, the Gottliebs leave Ramsay Street to manage their own record store in Anson's Corner. Upon Mark's return to Erinsborough twenty-five years later, he reveals that Phoebe and Stephen have five children.

== Reception ==
A writer for the BBC's Neighbours website stated that Stephen's most notable moment was "Fainting while watching Phoebe giving birth on video." The Sydney Morning Herald's Shelli-Anne Couch commented "Two snakes, two dead bodies, two live ones, a cemetery and a budding romance for good measure – could Lachlan Daddo have picked a better entry into the soapie world?" Some industry sources believed Stephen was "wasted" when he was paired with Phoebe, who was seventeen and six months pregnant when they met. During a feature on the show, Joanna Murray-Smith from The Age criticised the explosion storyline, saying "Sure Lochie (Daddo, from the Beaumaris-y version of the Quaid brothers) was crippled, so it wasn't a complete waste of time, but it was over in a flash with a couple of extras in emergency service uniforms."
