= Annalise Hartman =

- Neighbours character
- Portrayed by: Kimberley Davies
- Duration: 1993–1996, 2005, 2025
- First appearance: 15 January 1993
- Last appearance: 11 December 2025
- Introduced by: Ian Bradley (1993); Ric Pellizerri (2005); Jason Herbison (2025)
In-universe information
- Occupation: Student; Chambermaid; Barmaid; Poet; The Hungry Bite Cafe waitress and manager; Co-owner of Anna-Jo Promotions; Documentary maker
- Father: Tony Hartman
- Mother: Fiona Hartman
- Half-sisters: Joanna Hartman
- Husband: Sam Kratz

Annalise Hartman is a fictional character from the Australian soap opera Neighbours, played by Kimberley Davies. She made her debut during the episode broadcast on 15 January 1993 and departed on 31 January 1996. Davies reprised the role in July 2005, and again from 28 July 2025 and left again on 11 December 2025. Annalise has often been portrayed as having a conniving persona. Her notable storylines have included a cancer scare, surviving a plane crash and being jilted at the altar on her wedding day. The character has been noted for her many relationships, which also saw her dubbed by media sources as a "man-magnet" and a "blonde bombshell."

== Casting ==
Neighbours producers spotted Davies when she was out one night with her then boyfriend, Scott Michaelson (who played Brad Willis). They believed she would be perfect for a role in the show and offered her the part of Annalise. In 1996 Davies decided to quit the serial to pursue other projects. In 2005 Davies was approached by producers to return for the 20th anniversary. Davies was initially unsure about returning, citing recently having had a baby, but she later made the decision to return, stating: "Then I thought back over my whole time there and remembered what a fun, positive experience it was. So I decided why not, it'll be great to see everyone again." In June 2025, it was announced that Davies would be returning to the role later that year, with it being reported that Annalise would find out that "Erinsborough has changed a hell of a lot" since the 1990s.

== Characterisation ==
In her early days Annalise had manipulative tendencies and was used to getting what she wanted. Annalise's "not so nice" attitude resulted in viewers being unpleasant to Davies. In 2005, upon Annalise's return Davies spoke of how Annalise's personality had progressed, stating: "Annalise is more settled, she's still got her conniving ways about her and knows how to be a bitch. But she's happy in her personal life – she’s married to Sam and very much in love with him, and very happy in her career. She's now working for the BBC and is making a documentary about Ramsay Street – that's why she's back."

== Storylines ==
Annalise arrives at Number 24 Ramsay Street when her friend Beth Brennan (Natalie Imbruglia) introduces her to her landlord, Lou Carpenter (Tom Oliver), as a prospective tenant. Lou is instantly taken with Annalise and invites her to move in with him, Beth and Cameron Hudson (Benjamin Grant Mitchell). Lou and Annalise begin a relationship and when Annalise's mother Fiona (Suzanne Dudley) arrives, she informs Lou that her daughter is only 17 years old. Lou and Annalise break up after Annalise is seen kissing another man. Fiona then encourages Annalise to return to High School and finish Year 12. Annalise tries to seduce her teacher Wayne Duncan (Jonathon Sammy-Lee) but he rejects her. Scorned, Annalise invents a lie that Wayne had sexually harassed her. She only admits the truth when it looks like Wayne will be fired and apologises to him.

After dropping out of School, Annalise takes a job at Lassiter's as a chambermaid and later a barmaid at the local pub, The Waterhole. She has a clash of personalities with her employer Gaby Willis (Rachel Blakely) and they begin a lengthy feud. Annalise later learns Fiona has fled town after conning Jim Robinson (Alan Dale) out of his money, following his death and is disgusted with her. Helen Daniels (Anne Haddy), Jim's mother-in-law, invites Annalise to live with her and Wayne at Number 26. Annalise helps Helen through her grief over Jim.

When Annalise fails to report a gas leak that results in the pub exploding, she admits the truth to Philip Martin (Ian Rawlings), who later fires her. Cathy Alessi (Elspeth Ballantyne) then hires her to work in the Coffee Shop. Mark Gottlieb (Bruce Samazan) arrives as the new head chef at Lassiter's, and Annalise and Gaby compete for his affections. Mark chooses Annalise and they begin dating. A short while later, Annalise learns Fiona has died in a car crash and feels guilty for refusing to see her. Luke Foster (Murray Bartlett) arrives claiming to be her long-lost half-brother. Mark does some digging and exposes Luke as a con artist, leaving Annalise devastated.

Annalise and Gaby Willis survive a plane crash, a notable storyline for the character.

Annalise and Gaby put their feud behind them at Christmas and take a plane flight together. Disaster strikes when the plane's controls fail and Gaby is forced to make a crash landing in the Bush. Both women suffer minor injuries and are stranded, but are rescued by a helicopter. Some time after, Annalise and Mark become engaged, but on their wedding day, Mark stops the ceremony and tells Annalise he cannot marry her, as he has decided he wants to become a priest, which breaks her heart.

Sam Kratz (Richard Grieve) later declares his love for Annalise, so they get together. Squirrel (Brooke Howden) later lies to everyone, claiming she is pregnant with Sam's child. Sam's cousin Danni Stark (Eliza Szonert) later proves Squirrel was lying. After Susan Kennedy (Jackie Woodburne) notices a lump on Annalise's neck, doctors carry out a series of tests on her, then after a few weeks she receives the all clear, which makes her think about her life and she tells Sam she wants to move away with him. When they are about to leave together, Joanna Hartman (Emma Harrison) turns up and reveals to Annalise that she is her half-sister. Joanna introduces Annalise to their father, Tony Hartman (Michael Carman). Annalise initially struggles to accept his job as a female impersonator, but they reconcile. Tony gives Annalise and Joanna some money and they set up their own public relations company. The sisters' first client turns out to be a con man and he steals their money. Annalise has sex with Stonefish Rebecchi (Anthony Engelman); after Sam finds out their attraction has been building for months, he decides to end their relationship. With this, Annalise leaves, despite Jo's pleas for her to stay. Sam later joins her. Nine years later, Annalise returns to Erinsborough to show a documentary film she has made about Ramsay Street. She also reveals that she and Sam married five years earlier.

Annalise returns to Erinsborough twenty years later after Paul Robinson (Stefan Dennis) requests her help running Lassiter's. Annalise reveals that she has been running a UK Lassiter's in Manchester and has broken up with Sam. Her arrival annoys Paul's co-manager, Krista Sinclair (Majella Davis), whom he has not informed. Annalise begins working on an event to secure the hotel with a Bronze Bell award, and Krista begins to feel undermined by Annalise's presence despite Paul comparing them to each other. Annalise overhears Krista criticising her; they have an argument and Annalise tells Paul she cannot work with Krista. Annalise's plans for a jewellery contest are sabotaged and she suspects that Sam could be behind it. Annalise and Krista become friends and work well together. They discover that Paul was testing them to see whether they could manage Lassiter's together should he divide his time between Melbourne and New York. Krista forces Paul to become a silent partner for his scheming, and Annalise considers moving back permanently. Sam arrives and reveals that he wants Annalise back. The jewellery event is successful despite Katrina Marshall being exposed as the event's saboteur. Sam buys Annalise a business in Australia and she agrees to reconcile. Annalise turns down the offer of managing Lassiters and leaves with Sam.

== Reception ==
The BBC said Annalise's most notable moment was "[b]eing jilted at the altar by Mark Gottlieb who had decided to become a priest". To celebrate the 25th anniversary of Neighbours, satellite broadcasting company Sky profiled 25 characters that they believed were the most memorable in the series' history. Annalise was included in the list and Sky said: "Man magnet Annalise liked her men dark, tall and plentiful. There was swarthy cowboy-a-like Wayne Duncan, big-haired nice boy Mark Gottlieb (before he decided to become a priest), biker Sam Kratz, and she got engaged to the hottest of them all, Lou. She was also used for the best moment in Neighbours' history, when the Pet Shop Boys asked Marlene Kratz for directions, and Annalise threw a tantrum because she didn't get to talk to them. She returned to make a documentary about Ramsay Street on the show's 20th anniversary that was great, but inevitably only about 60% as good as the 'Pet People' incident". Media company Virgin Media describe Annalise as a "blonde bombshell" and stated in their opinion that she is best remembered for being jilted at the altar after fiancé Mark Gottlieb, who decided to become a priest

Editor of MSN TV Lorna Cooper commented on Annalise's relationships and her appearance, stating: "Annalise had a convoluted love life during her time on Ramsay Street; she dated old geezer Lou Carpenter (how? How in the name of logic did that happen?) and even got dumped at the altar when her boyfriend decided he wanted to become a priest. Needless to say, the soap made good use of Annalise's assets". Telecommunications network Orange profiled past Neighbours characters; in this feature, they describe Annalise's most memorable moment as being her wedding ceremony to Mark. All About Soap magazine placed Annalise and Mark's wedding at number eight on their twenty greatest soap weddings' list. The magazine said: "Annalise looked more likely to make a priest renounce his vows than drive a man into the arms of the church, but that's exactly what happened when Mark ditched Neighbours'hottest babe at the altar to devote his life to God. Strange but true...".

Sue Heath from The Northern Echo said that Annalise is "probably the last person you'd imagine would become a documentary film-maker". She opined that "this is a blonde who looks like she'd be more comfortable in front of a camera than pointing it at Ramsay Street's finest." She also criticised her film-making style, observing her as editing "together a string of congratulatory comments" only. Annalise was placed at number thirty-one on the Huffpost's "35 greatest Neighbours characters of all time" feature. Television critic Adam Beresford described her as "contractually obliged to be described as a 'blonde bombshell', Annalise was a hugely popular character whose messy love life dominated the show in the mid-90s." He added that her "biggest WTF? moment" was Mark jilting her at the altar. In a 2022 feature profiling the "top 12 iconic Neighbours characters", critic Sheena McGinley of the Irish Independent placed Annalise as her eleventh choice. She called Annalise "Erinsborough’s answer to Pamela Anderson". Of her arrival and involvement with Lou, McGinley scathed "cue Annalise in a teeny school pinafore. The 1990s – not that long ago and yet a world away." A Herald Sun reporter included Annalise's arrival in their "Neighbours' 30 most memorable moments" feature.
