= Wayne Duncan (Neighbours) =

- Neighbours character
- Portrayed by: Jonathon Sammy-Lee
- Duration: 1993–1994
- First appearance: 4 February 1993
- Last appearance: 4 March 1994
- Introduced by: Ian Bradley
In-universe information
- Occupation: Teacher
- Mother: Thelma Duncan
- Brothers: Troy Duncan
- Other relatives: Helen Daniels; Paul Robinson; Julie Martin; Lucy Robinson; Hannah Martin

Wayne Duncan is a fictional character from the Australian soap opera Neighbours, played by Jonathon Sammy-Lee. He made his first screen appearance as Wayne during the episode broadcast on 4 February 1993. Wayne joins the teaching staff at Erinsborough High and has an unorthodox approach to education. He is arrogant, intelligent and articulate – all traits that make him confident in arguments. A country man and strong believer in violence when protecting property – Wayne's attitude and gun possession polarized the way other characters viewed him. He has a destructive romance with Gaby Willis (Rachel Blakely). The pair enjoy sparring throughout their relationship but eventually realise they need to separate.

Wayne also has relationships with Beth Brennan (Natalie Imbruglia) and Lauren Carpenter (Sarah Vandenbergh). One notable storyline for Wayne saw him brutally assaulted by a bike gang, which subsequently saw the leader being found dead and Wayne fighting a murder charge. Sammy-Lee was annoyed when the storyline came to an abrupt end. He decided to leave the role after one year, as he feared that staying longer would type cast him as a soap opera actor. His final appearance aired on 4 March 1994, seeing Wayne return to live on the farm. Critics have noted that Wayne was popular for his attractive appearance and smug persona.

== Casting ==
Sammy-Lee secured the role of Wayne following two years of training to be an actor. He viewed the role as a "brilliant way" to learn more about the profession. Neighbours marks his first major television role, following smaller parts in Police Rescue and E Street, feature film Turtle Beach, and stage work.

== Development ==
=== Characterisation ===
"Wayne seems to have had a relationship with everyone but it has to stop somewhere. Nice characters tend to be one-dimensional, but because Wayne has a bit of a short fuse, it gives him a darker more interesting side"

— Sammy-Lee on Wayne's personality. (1993)

Wayne is a chemistry and physical education teacher. Sandra McLean of TV Week said theory has no place in his classroom and his students are in for "a radical kind of schooling." Wayne has an arrogant personality. Wanting to become acquainted with relatives, he arrives in Erinsborough to live with his mother's cousin, Helen Daniels (Anne Haddy). He had been forced out of his old teaching job amid lies that he was romancing a student. This is not helped by infatuated student Annalise Hartman (Kimberley Davies) creating more lies. Wayne enjoys getting into arguments because he is articulate and intelligent. But his attitude towards owning firearms alienates fellow residents, particularly upsetting Pam Willis (Sue Jones). Wayne believes in protecting personal property with a gun and even keeps one while living in Ramsay Street. His views stemmed from a small country town upbringing on a farm.

What's on TV reporter Donna Hay wrote a special feature about Wayne. She detailed that he has dark and brooding looks. But he is "volatile to say the least. Underneath that cultured exterior there's a macho caveman just waiting to get out." He likes to play hard to get with woman. Even when he is in a relationship it is "more off than on". He does not have promising career prospects because of his unorthodox teaching methods. In addition he has an unsavoury past with a "nasty habit of losing his temper and knocking people out". Ultimately Wayne is a country lover. He enjoys long hikes in the outback. He enjoys setting up camp alongside birds and animals. Hay quipped that Wayne would only shoot them after. Sammy-Lee used his own life experiences in his portrayal of a school teacher. He told an Inside Soap reporter that "I was a real terror at school, and that's why I can relate to Wayne. I used to be the kid in class who gave the teachers a hard tie so I know what he's facing."

=== Relationships and assault ===
"Wayne and Gaby were like chalk and cheese. He liked sport. She hated it. He liked going for walks in the country. She liked going to the theatre. But one way or another these two were determined to date. However, every time they went out they ended up fighting like cat and dog."

— Author Josephine Monroe on Wayne and Gaby. (1994)

An Inside Soap reporter revealed that Wayne would arrive in Ramsay Street as new school teacher and love interest of Gaby Willis (Rachel Blakely). But their romance would be short-lived as Gaby's "blood runs cold" when he is accused of murder. Despite constant fighting the pair decided to date. They tried to make their relationship work but it "ended mostly in disaster". Gaby enjoys cinema trips but Wayne prefers to go camping. Gaby viewed Wayne to be arrogant and he saw her as precocious. They exchanged harsh words with each other to hide their passion for each other. Author Josephine Monroe said "they were about as mis-matched as you could get. She also viewed their relationship as only based on lust. They were obsessed with each other, but spent most of their time together sparring. The duo come to realise they have a destructive relationship. They force themselves to move on by avoiding each other. Sammy-Lee described it as a "nightmare relationship" resulting in a "terrible time together". He believed they are both attracted to one another's "stubborn and fiery" attitudes. While Blakely explained that "they really do care for each other, but Gaby decides it's just not right and she ends it." The duos fight scenes have included Gaby throwing drinks at Wayne and hitting him. Blakely recalls one scene in-which she had too slap Sammy-Lee. But she got that into character that upon delivering the slap she injured the actor.

The murder accusation story developed following Lou Carpenter (Tom Oliver) and Stephen Gottlieb (Lochie Daddo) paying a biker gang to attack Russell Butler (Stephen Whittaker). But the gang mistake Wayne for Russell and try to kill him. Sammy-Lee told Josephine Monroe from Inside Soap that the gang leave Wayne for dead. At one point it looks as though he will die, but "in true soap style" he is found seconds before death. Wayne becomes focused on gaining revenge and the gang boss Cactus (Les Toth) is found dead. Sammy-Lee explained that the residents of Ramsay Street made big commotion over Wayne's possession of a gun - therefore believe he is responsible. Even Gaby believes he is guilty. The actor added "It's a big deal for Wayne because he got suspended once before from school for an [alleged] relationship with an underage student [...] his career really is on the line." The plot did not develop into a long-running storyline. Wayne was cleared of all charges brought against him. This annoyed Sammy-Lee who wanted it to be "sensational" with a trial and big court room scenes. He also accused Neighbours of being fearful and unwilling to fully develop potential stories. Following the incident Wayne has to fight to be reinstated at Erinsborough High. He also has to deal with the attitudes of character who remained unconvinced of his innocence. But he could not forgive Gaby for doubting him.

Wayne begins a relationship with Beth Brennan (Natalie Imbruglia). She had called off her wedding to Brad (Scott Michaelson) because he was unfaithful. But Brad tries to warn Wayne off Beth and they both propose to her. Wayne withdraws his proposal leaving Beth to accept Brad's. Imbruglia told Kelly Beswick from Inside Soap that "going out with Wayne helped her repair her self-confidence and gave her back a sense of worth." But she added that Wayne was only ever a "diversion" to suppress her feelings for Brad. Hay believed that Wayne was in need of a "steady girl" like Beth in his life.

=== Departure ===
Sammy-Lee decided to leave Neighbours and Wayne departed in 1994. He told Monroe that he never intended to remain in the role long and feared becoming type-cast as a soap actor. Writers planned Wayne's exit to coincide with stories leading to Sarah Vandenbergh's exit as Lauren Carpenter. Wayne and Lauren begin a casual relationship in New Year 1994. Wayne's "matchmaking" brother, Troy (Damian Walshe-Howling) tricks the pair into dating. When Lauren gets drunk at a dinner party, Wayne offers to walk her home and she pulls him over her doorstep and kisses him as their friends stare. Sammy-Lee revealed "Then, when she invites him in for coffee, she spills milk on her blouse and takes it off. Wayne does the gentlemanly thing by covering her up with his jacket and putting her to bed. But Lauren reads more into it." The following morning, Lauren assumes she has had sex with Wayne and forgot what actually happened. The truth is eventually revealed to Lauren and the misunderstanding gave their romance "a shaky start". Fletcher commented that friendship turned to lust for both characters during the storyline. The storyline completed a recurring theme of relationship storyline Sammy-Lee played out. He told Fletcher that "Wayne can't control his hormones. In just a year in Eringborough there isn't a girl he hasn't tried to date. As long as they're pretty, he'll fall for them." Sammy-Lee concluded that after Wayne's long line of women, his fellow cast mates created a running joke that he was only left his relative Helen left to seduce. His final scenes showed Wayne deciding to move back to live on his farm.

== Storylines ==
Wayne gets a job as a teacher at Erinsborough High and arrives at 26 Ramsay Street looking for his mother's cousin, Helen. Helen's son-in-law, Jim Robinson (Alan Dale) mistakes Wayne for a potential house buyer but Wayne explains who he is. Jim agrees Wayne can stay as he has plenty of room. While in the local pub, The Waterhole one night, Wayne tries to get the attention of Gaby and she accuses him of trying to grope her and pours beer all over him. Despite the animosity, there is a genuine attraction between the two and Gaby's grandfather Bert (Bud Tingwell) gets them together. However, Gaby's mother, Pam takes a dislike to Wayne one evening when he joins the family for dinner after arguing over politics. Wayne's admission of keeping a gun in the garage does him no favours, despite his reasoning that he grew up in the country with the sense of protecting his property.

When Wayne gives Annalise detention, she responds by spreading rumours around the school that they are having an affair. Principal Peter Knotts (Simon Hughes) is forced to suspend Wayne after it is revealed that he left his previous school due to rumours of a similar incident. Wayne is vilified as a result and members of his own family, including Helen's granddaughter, Julie Martin (Julie Mullins), begin shunning him. Annalise eventually owns up to her lies and Wayne forgives her and they become friends after she finishes her schooling.

After being brutally beaten by a gang of heavies in a case of mistaken identity, Wayne goes back home to recuperate at his mother's farm. When he returns, he is shocked to learn Cactus, a biker and one of the heavies who beat him, has been shot dead. Wayne tells the police he was with Lou at the time of the murder but the alibi is ruined when Lou's assistant tells them Lou was at the Car Yard all day. Wayne tries to prove his innocence and for a while it looks like he may face imprisonment. Luckily, a fellow biker comes forward and the charges against Wayne are dropped. This puts an end to Wayne and Gaby's relationship after the lack of support she has shown.

Wayne later becomes involved with Beth, who had recently been engaged to Brad which ended when she found out about Brad's affair with Lauren. Brad later tries to win Beth back and Wayne is prepared to fight for her. Both men propose to Beth, but she ultimately chooses Brad, leaving Wayne crushed. Following his failed engagement with Beth, Wayne has a brief romance with Lauren, who is also feeling hurt after Brad and Beth reunite and marry.

Vince Roland (Bob Brown), Knotts' successor at Erinsborough High, pushes Wayne's buttons by forcing him to teach an extra subject with no pay increase. Wayne feels his frustration building as Roland suspended him over the murder enquiry. The final straw comes when Roland admonishes him in front of his class for being late due to slashed tyres. Wayne can stand no more and punches Roland in the face. After this event, Wayne is disillusioned with being a teacher and general life in Erinsborough. Before he leaves, Wayne introduces fast bowler Mike Whitney as Erinsborough High's new cricket coach. On the day of Wayne's departure, he tries to slip away without a fuss but Helen arranges a surprise leaving party where the students of Erinsborough High present him with an "Outstanding contribution in the classroom" trophy and thank him for being such a great teacher.

== Reception ==
To celebrate the 20th anniversary of Neighbours, the BBC asked readers to nominate their twenty favourite obscure characters. Wayne came in third place and the readers said "How's about Wayne Duncan? He lived at the Robinson house, went out with Gabby Willis for a while and could open "stubbies" using only the fold between his upper arm and forearm. What a guy". Matthew Clifton, writing for entertainment website Heckler Spray, included Wayne in his list of "The Best Ever Mid-90s Neighbours Characters". Clifton said "The aforementioned Wayne was a hunky teacher at Erinsborough High, who was notable for having a top lip that never moved when he spoke. This always made you think of that other long haired titan of the era, Pearl Jam's Eddie Vedder." Inside Soap's Monroe branded Wayne a "smug school teacher". Woman's Own Fletcher said "sexy high-school teacher Wayne, he's known for his wickedly cute smile." Monroe has branded Wayne was introduced to continue a theme of good-looking characters. She added that he was "the object of many schoolgirl crushes".
