= Willis family =

Fictional family from the Australian soap opera Neighbours

- Neighbours family
- First appearance: 31 October 1989
- Introduced by: Don Battye (1989); Ric Pellizzeri (2005); Richard Jasek (2013)
- Duration: 1989–1996, 2005, 2013–
Family members
- Bert Willis; Faye Hudson; Doug Willis; Cameron Hudson; Adam Willis; Brad Willis; Cody Willis; Gaby Willis; John Willis; Terese Willis; Paige Smith; Imogen Willis; Josh Willis; Ned Willis; Piper Willis; Roxy Willis; Zac Willis; Freddie Brennan; Gabriel Smith; Matilda Turner

The Willis family are a fictional family from the Australian soap opera Neighbours. They were introduced by Don Battye in 1989, but left screens in 1996, before being reintroduced in 2013. The first family member to be seen on-screen was Brad Willis, who appeared in a guest capacity from October 1989, and then his sister Cody from November. The family became a more permanent fixture with the arrival of patriarch Doug Willis and his wife Pam, who moved onto Ramsay Street the following year. Cody was the last family member to regularly appear in the show until her on-screen death in 1996, which brought Pam back briefly to bury her daughter.

In 2013 Richard Jasek reintroduced a grown-up Brad with a new family; wife Terese, and twin teenagers Josh and Imogen. Doug and Pam returned in guest capacities, while Brad's long lost child Paige Smith joined the family a year later, and Brad and Terese's youngest daughter Piper arriving in 2015. The family was completed by Brad's eldest son Ned Willis in 2016, who arrived the same week that both Josh and Doug were killed off in "Hotel Death Trap Week", in which Lassiter's Hotel exploded.

== Development ==
In February 2013, it was announced that Brad Willis would be returning to the soap, with the role recast to Kip Gamblin. Brad was joined by his wife, new character Terese (Rebekah Elmaloglou) and their children, Josh (Harley Bonner) and Imogen Willis (Ariel Kaplan).

In April 2019, it was announced that Zima Anderson had joined the cast of the soap as new character Roxy Willis, the daughter of former character Adam Willis (Ian Williams) and Gemma Ramsay (Beth Buchanan). Anderson later left the role and her exit aired on 12 April 2022. In January 2025, it was announced that Anderson had reprised the role.

== Family members ==
- Bert Willis
  - Doug Willis, son of Bert; married Pam Beresford
    - Adam Willis, son of Doug and Pam; married Gemma Ramsay
      - Roxy Willis, daughter of Adam and Gemma; married Kyle Canning
        - Jett Canning, son of Roxy and Kyle
    - John Willis, son of Doug and Pam
    - Brad Willis, son of Doug and Pam; married Beth Brennan, Terese Petrides and Lauren Carpenter
      - Paige Smith, daughter of Brad and Lauren; married Mark Brennan
        - Gabriel Smith, son of Paige and Jack Callahan
        - Freddie Brennan, son of Paige and Mark
      - Ned Willis, son of Brad and Beth
      - Josh Willis, son of Brad and Terese
        - Matilda Turner, daughter of Josh and Amber Turner
      - Imogen Willis, daughter of Brad and Terese; married Daniel Robinson
      - Piper Willis, daughter of Brad and Terese
    - Gaby Willis, daughter of Doug and Pam
      - Zac Willis, son of Gaby and Jack Flynn
    - Cody Willis, daughter of Doug and Pam
  - Faye Hudson, daughter of Bert; married Kevin Hudson
    - Cameron Hudson, son of Faye and Kevin

== Brad Willis ==
Bradley "Brad" Willis made his first screen appearance during the episode broadcast on 31 October 1989. He was initially played by Benjamin Mitchell, before Scott Michaelson took over the role two years later. Brad was re-introduced alongside his sister, Gaby (Rachel Blakely), during a period of roller coaster ratings for the show. A reporter for the Herald Sun called Brad "one of the show's most popular characters" and commented that Michaelson had a huge following because of his "blonde surfer looks." For his portrayal of Brad, Michaelson earned a nomination for Most Popular Actor at the 1993 Logie Awards. Kip Gamblin took over the role in June 2013 when Brad and his family returned to the show.

== Cody Willis ==
Cody Willis, played by Amelia Frid, made her first on-screen appearance on 24 November 1989. Frid successfully auditioned for the role of Cody and she called the experience a "right time, right place thing", she also added that "it was all kind of surreal." Cody became the second member of the Willis family to arrive in Ramsay Street and she dates both Josh Anderson (Jeremy Angerson) and Todd Landers' (Kristian Schmid). Cody is described as a "studious girl".

== Doug Willis ==
Douglas "Doug" Willis , played by Terence Donovan, made his first screen appearance on 1 August 1990. Doug is described as being a "bit of a Regular Joe who didn't like rocking the boat or standing out from the crowd." He is also "a man's man" who is not afraid of using his fists and takes great pleasure from making home-brewed beer with Lou Carpenter (Tom Oliver). A writer for the BBC said Doug's most notable moment was "Having an affair with Jill Weir." Donovan made a brief return for the show's 20th anniversary celebrations in July 2005.

== Pam Willis ==
Pamela "Pam" Willis (previously Beresford), played by Sue Jones, made her first screen appearance during the episode broadcast on 6 August 1990. Jones was cast in the role following a screen test. Pam is characterised by her helpful personality, she loves her four children and continually tries to help them out. Pam extended her caring nature through her time on the show working as a nurse. Josephine Monroe praised Pam in her book Neighbours: The first 10 years stating: "A real salt-of-the-earth-type. Pam could always be relied on to help out, especially if it benefited one of her four children." The BBC said Pam's most notable moment was "Kicking Doug out of the house after having he told her about his affair with Jill Weir."

== Adam Willis ==
Adam Willis, played by Ian Williams, made his first appearance on 9 August 1990. Williams was invited to play the role of Adam shortly after he appeared in Bony, another Grundy production. Williams said the part appealed to him as it was flexible and Adam's humour kept him "fired up." Williams explained that he felt similar to his character as they both loved their families, but he was not impressed with Adam's naivety. The BBC said Adam's most notable moment was "Chauffeuring a Lassiter's client while wearing a toga."

== Gaby Willis ==
Gabrielle "Gaby" Willis, played by Rachel Blakely made her first on-screen appearance 12 August 1991. A highly ambitious woman who works in the Robinson Corporation, though her aggressive nature is somewhat tempered after she gives birth to son Zac. Gaby becomes the proprietor of the upmarket boutique "Gabrielle's" until her departure in 1994. In 2005, Blakely was one of over twenty ex-cast members who returned to Neighbours to appear in Annalise Hartman's documentary film about Ramsay Street.

== Cameron Hudson ==
Cameron Hudson
- Neighbours character
- Portrayed by: Benjamin Grant Mitchell
- Duration: 1992–1993
- First appearance: 24 March 1992
- Last appearance: 23 April 1993
- Introduced by: Don Battye
In-universe information
- Occupation: Lawyer; Journalist; Stand-up comedian
- Father: Kevin Hudson
- Mother: Faye Hudson
- Grandfathers: Bert Willis
- Uncles: Doug Willis
- First cousins: Adam Willis; Gaby Willis; Brad Willis; Cody Willis

Cameron Hudson, played by Benjamin Grant Mitchell, made his first appearance on 24 March 1992. Mitchell had recently finished appearing in the Victorian State Opera's production of The Wizard of Oz. Cameron is the son of Faye Hudson (Lorraine Bayly), who arrives in Ramsay Street in to defend his aunt Pam Willis (Sue Jones) who is accused of murdering Garth Kirby (Roy Baldwin). Cameron is able to prove Pam's innocence successfully. Cameron repairs his fraught relationship with Faye and moves in with her at Number 32. After Faye moves out, Cameron invites Beth Brennan (Natalie Imbruglia) to move in with him. Cameron becomes involved with Jacqueline Summers (Tiffany Lamb) after he helps her on a case but the relationship ends when he finds that he could be facing legal proceedings for becoming involved with a client and when Jacqueline realises he is not completely convinced of her innocence in the case.

Cameron later finds himself offside with the Martin family when he defends Raymond Chambers (Greg Parker) who is accused of trying to abduct Hannah (Rebecca Ritters). Despite Chambers' ex-wife mentioning that he had previously tried to kidnap their daughter in Hong Kong and eyewitness testimony from Toby Mangel (Ben Geurens), Chambers is acquitted, furthering Cameron's stress and he begins to doubt himself as a lawyer. When Cameron intervenes in a confrontation between Chambers and Toby, He is even more convinced of Chambers' guilt and when Cameron arrives home, he finds Chambers' waiting for him in the dark and he blames Cameron for his life being ruined. Cameron forces Chambers to get help and after he breaks down in tears, Chambers hands himself in to the police and confesses to the abduction. The Martins apologise for their treatment of Cameron.

After Helen Daniels (Anne Haddy) wants to rent Number 32 to the Martins, Cameron and Beth move in with Lou Carpenter (Tom Oliver). During this, Cameron does some investigating and discovers Gavin Heywood (Peter Hosking) is involved in some shady business. When Heywood catches Cameron, He has him roughed up by some thugs and is about to have him thrown down a lift shaft. Cameron offers to work for Heywood to prevent being killed and uses this to gain more information. Heywood then begins involving members of Cameron's family in his business.

Cameron's life is endangered again when he overhears Heywood and his associate Noddy (Richard Piper) plot to kill him but he engineers a plan which results in Heywood's downfall. Cameron then changes career track and becomes a journalist for the Erinsborough news but is frustrated and surprises everyone with his next career choice, stand-up comedy.

When Lou's daughter, Lauren (Sarah Vandenbergh) arrives from Queensland, Cameron is smitten with her but does not know she is having an affair with Cameron's cousin, Brad (Scott Michaelson). In order to ward off Cameron's suspicions, Lauren agrees to go out with him. The truth later emerges and Cameron leaves Erinsborough in disgust.

== Bert Willis ==
Bert Willis
- Neighbours character
- Portrayed by: Bud Tingwell
- First appearance: 18 February 1993
- Last appearance: 5 March 1993
- Introduced by: Ian Bradley
In-universe information
- Sons: Doug Willis
- Daughters: Faye Hudson
- Grandsons: Adam Willis; Brad Willis; Cameron Hudson
- Granddaughters: Gaby Willis; Cody Willis

Bert Willis, played by Bud Tingwell, made his first screen appearance on 18 February 1993. Bert is Doug (Terence Donovan) and Faye's (Lorraine Bayly) father. He walked out on his wife and children when they were young, leading to a falling out with Doug that lasted for many years. Bert's granddaughter, Gaby (Rachel Blakely), got in touch with him and they began a correspondence. She and her mother later invited Bert to stay with them, although Doug was against the idea. An Inside Soap writer commented "He won't tell them what the problem is, and they think that whatever it is, they can re-build the relationship. But they've got to work fast because times's not on their side."

Bert is asked to come and stay with his family in Erinsborough by his granddaughter Gaby. Bert tries to explain and apologise to his son, Doug, for walking out on him and the family. However, Doug is unable to forgive him and asks that he leave. While speaking to Wayne Duncan (Jonathan Sammy Lee), Bert reveals that he is dying and Wayne realises that he came to make amends before he died. He eventually tells Doug about Bert's condition and Doug manages to stop his father from leaving on a boat, before making up with him. Bert is grateful to Wayne for his part in the reunion with Doug. He tells Gaby that his dying wish is to see her and Wayne get together as a couple.

The episode featuring Bert's revelation about his terminal cancer was nominated for the Australian Film Institute Award for Best Episode in a Television Drama Serial in 1993.

== Terese Willis ==
Terese Willis, played by Rebekah Elmaloglou, made her first screen appearance on 14 May 2013. The character and Elmaloglou's casting was announced on 7 February 2013. The actress and her family relocated to Melbourne to be closer to the set. Shortly before she began filming her first scenes, Elmaloglou had to ask the producers to change the pronunciation of her character's name. Terese was introduced as the second wife of Brad Willis (Kip Gamblin). The couple were joined by their teenage twins; Josh (Harley Bonner) and Imogen (Ariel Kaplan). Elmaloglou thought Terese was the kind of person she would be friends with and thought they were similar in terms of how organised they both were. Terese first comes to Erinsborough to meet with Paul Robinson (Stefan Dennis), who believes he is interviewing her for a job at Lassiter's Hotel.

== Imogen Willis ==
Imogen Willis, played by Ariel Kaplan, made her first screen appearance on 20 May 2013. The character was announced on 7 February 2013, while Kaplan's casting was revealed on 18 February. Kaplan was studying at the 16th Street Actors Studio in Melbourne in 2012 when she was offered the role of Imogen. Imogen is Joshua's (Harley Bonner) twin sister and the teenage daughter of Brad (Kip Gamblin) and Terese Willis (Rebekah Elmaloglou). Kaplan commented "I love the character, she is outwardly confident and very comfortable in her own skin, and doesn't feel she has to impress anyone by doing things she might regret. I think she is a great role model for young girls." Imogen often feels sidelined by her family and resents things being organised around Joshua's potential swimming career. While Bonner commented that Joshua and Imogen have a love-hate relationship.

== Josh Willis ==
Joshua "Josh" Willis, played by Harley Bonner, made his first screen appearance on 20 May 2013. The character was announced on 7 February 2013, while Bonner's casting was revealed on 18 February. The actor was persuaded to attend the audition for the role by his agent. Bonner said that he was nervous on his first day on set because he and his on-screen family had only just met and had to pretend to be a family unit straight away. Josh is the teenage son of Brad (Kip Gamblin) and Terese Willis (Rebekah Elmaloglou). Bonner stated that Josh is driven and does not let anything get in his way. He gets on well with his parents, but has a love-hate relationship with his twin sister Imogen (Ariel Kaplan). Josh was also an elite swimmer, which means Bonner had to embrace his character's hobby and spend a lot of time in a local pool during filming.

== Paige Smith ==
Paige Smith (also Novak), played by Olympia Valance, made her first screen appearance on 2 June 2014. The character and casting was announced on 9 March 2014. Paige marks Valance's first acting role and she won the part after a lengthy audition process, which included multiple call-backs. Valance described her character as being "cool and sexy and a bit edgy". She thought viewers would love Paige, especially as she is not mean. Series producer Jason Herbison thought Valance was "the perfect fit for Paige" and called the character "fiery". Paige was revealed to be the daughter of Lauren Carpenter (Kate Kendall) and Brad Willis (Kip Gamblin). When Paige learned that her biological parents were looking for her, her curiosity was piqued and she decided to go to Erinsborough to learn more about them. Paige initially decided to keep her identity a secret.

== Piper Willis ==
Piper Willis, played by Mavournee Hazel, made her first screen appearance on 16 September 2015. The character has often been mentioned since the arrival of her on-screen family in May 2013, while Hazel's casting was announced on 18 August 2015. The actress relocated to Melbourne for filming and commented "It's a great feeling to be rewarded with the role of Piper after years of hard work, especially when I fell in love with the character after my first audition." Ahead of her first appearance, the character was featured in a series of webisodes titled Hey Piper, which see her talking to her family via online video calls. Piper is the youngest daughter of Brad (Kip Gamblin) and Terese Willis (Rebekah Elmaloglou). She has been away studying in Canada. Hazel stated that she and the producers had a similar idea of how they wanted the character to be, and she was billed as being "feisty" and "quirky".

== Ned Willis ==
Ned Willis, played by Ben Hall, made his first screen appearance on 6 April 2016. Hall's casting was announced on 11 March 2016, while the character has been referred to for several years following his off-screen birth. Following his initial guest stint, Hall later returned to filming and Ned returned on 10 August. Ned is the son of Brad Willis (Kip Gamblin) and Beth Brennan (Natalie Imbruglia). His introduction united all of Brad's children on-screen for the first time. Hall explained that Ned has been living with his grandparents in Darwin. Ned is a tattoo artist and Hall commented that it would lead to some "mischief". He also described Ned as being "very complex" and "quite manipulative", adding "he has had a bit to deal with and it's really interesting how his story line pans out." The character was reintroduced as a regular on 20 June 2018.

== Roxy Willis ==
Roxy Willis, played by Zima Anderson, made her first appearance on 29 April 2019. The character and Anderson's casting details were announced on 14 April 2019. Anderson had wanted to secure a role on Neighbours since she moved to Melbourne, where it is filmed, two years prior. Of joining the cast, Anderson stated "I've been so lucky with the role of Roxy, I've already found myself in a wide range of crazy situations from virtually the first scene which has been so much fun and really challenged me, I'm constantly learning." Roxy is introduced as "a wild girl from the Northern Territory" and the niece of regular character Terese Willis (Rebekah Elmaloglou), although Anderson pointed out that she is not actually related to Terese by blood. She is the daughter of Adam Willis (Ian Williams) and Gemma Ramsay (Beth Buchanan). Gemma hopes Terese can sort out Roxy's rebellious ways using her own experiences. Anderson described Roxy as being "very fun and very naughty". She is also "full of heart", "bubbly", "sporadic and does whatever she wants." Roxy's older boyfriend Vance Abernethy (Conrad Coleby) was also introduced shortly after her arrival.

== Reception ==
During a feature on Neighbours, Anna Pickard of The Guardian tried to choose the characters she would be most starstruck by if she met them. She said "It would have to be the Willis family. All of them. Pam, Doug, Adam, Gaby, Brad and Cody".
