= Daddo =

Daddo is a surname. Notable people with the surname include:

- Andrew Daddo (born 1967), Australian actor, author, and television personality
- Cameron Daddo (born 1965), Australian actor, musician, and presenter
- Lochie Daddo (born 1970), Australian actor and television presenter, brother of Andrew and Cameron
