= Beth Brennan =

- Neighbours character
- Portrayed by: Natalie Imbruglia
- Duration: 1992–1994, 2022
- First appearance: 6 January 1992
- Last appearance: 28 July 2022
- Introduced by: Don Battye (1992); Stanley Walsh (1994); Jason Herbison (2022)
In-universe information
- Other names: Beth Willis
- Occupation: Chambermaid; Builder's apprentice
- Family: Willis
- Father: Bill Brennan
- Mother: Phyllis Brennan
- Brothers: David Brennan
- Husband: Brad Willis (1993–; divorced)
- Sons: Ned Willis

Beth Brennan (also Willis) is a fictional character from the Australian television soap opera Neighbours, played by Natalie Imbruglia. She made her debut screen appearance in the episode broadcast on 6 January 1992. Beth is characterised as a nice person who lets people take advantage of her kind personality. Beth works as a builder's apprentice in the construction industry and this meant she was supposed to have a "tough" persona. Writers never developed these traits and Imbruglia felt that they had let the character down. Instead, Imbruglia described Beth as "too nice" and just "goes all ga ga and cries." In her backstory, Beth is a product of a broken home and was sexually abused by her mother's boyfriend. The character was also portrayed as a virgin, which played an important part in forming her early stories. Beth's main relationship was her long-standing partnership with Brad Willis (Scott Michaelson). Beth jilted him on their wedding day when she discovers Brad has been having an affair with Lauren Carpenter (Sarah Vandenbergh). Imbruglia believed the story was unrealistic but provided good drama.

Other stories include facing gender discrimination in the workplace and her relationships with Rod Baker (Chris Lloyds) and Wayne Duncan (Jonathan Sammy-Lee). Imbruglia and Michaelson decided to leave Neighbours. She was unhappy with the fame that came from acting in a soap opera. Beth's characterisation also began to irritate Imbruglia to the degree that when she left, Imbruglia "had enough of her". Their departure story featured Beth and Brad leaving Erinsborough and moving to Perth after their second wedding goes ahead. The character returned briefly in 1994 for the naming day of Brad's nephew, Zac Willis (Jay Callahan). In 2022, Imbruglia reprised the role for a cameo in the final episode (prior to the reboot) of Neighbours.

== Casting ==
Of her casting, Imbruglia told Susan Chenery from The Sydney Morning Herald that "I was jumping all around the living room. It changed my life overnight." The show's casting director Jan Russ recalled meeting Imbruglia in her audition, stating "she was a gorgeous looking young girl. She has a wonderful, natural quality, a lot of charm, a lot of self-confidence, and inner determination. She exuded this magical component. She played a girl from a small town and she had that sort of naïve quality." Imbruglia was sixteen when she auditioned for and was cast in the role of Beth.

The actress had to relocate from Sydney to Melbourne for filming. Imbruglia's character was initially written into the show for just a few weeks and she had to wait two months to find out whether she would become a permanent cast member. Imbruglia told a reporter for Inside Soap that "it was eight weeks of sheer torture. Every time the phone rang my nerves jangled, too. When my agent finally called to break the news, she knew how nervous I was so she told me to get a chair and sit down." Imbruglia's agent told her that the show's producers wanted to sign her for a year and she believed the permanent position would allow her to prove herself.

== Development ==
=== Characterisation ===
"Beth was sweet, naïve, a country girl, old-fashioned, not a '90s girl at all. And a tomboy, as well, a brickie (construction worker). She was a nice person, bordering on boring nice - I'm not that nice, and she wasn't ambitious. She wasn't spicy enough!"

— Imbruglia describing Beth's characterisation. (1998)

Beth is the product of a broken home and was brought up in the countryside by her forceful mother, Bunny Lawson (Jan Huggett). Beth is characterised as immature and had old-fashioned values. Beth has long brown hair and Imbruglia has claimed that she was not allowed to cut her hair for two years. The character also dresses like a tomboy, she is sweet and naïve and her old-fashioned ways make her unlike other girls living during the 1990s. Beth does not fit the female stereotype because she chose a career in the construction business. In one story she faces prejudice from a male employer who would not offer her an apprenticeship. Working in the construction industry meant Beth was originally supposed to be portrayed as a tough female, working in a male dominated business. This persona was quickly dropped as further scripts were developed. The result was Beth just being portrayed as a nice person, but Imbruglia thought she was too nice. She told Louise Manson writing for Soap that "I'm not that nice. No-one is that nice. I'm a lot stronger than Beth. She thinks she's tough but she's not. She was originally supposed to be a lot tougher, being a builders' labourer. But the scripts didn't develop that part for her."

Beth was rarely seen getting angry which confused Imbruglia. The actress stated that she would have been "throwing punches" if people treated her the way Neighbours' did Beth. Crying was the character's usual emotional outlet writers chose. Imbruglia observed that "she's too nice for own good, people walk all over her. Beth doesn't let her anger out very much. She just goes all ga ga and cries." Beth's characterisation frustrated Imbruglia and this made her dislike the character. She told Caro Thompson from Woman magazine that "she was frustrating because she was so immature. She had this old-fashioned idea that she should marry the first man she slept with. I found it very hard to identify with her and by the time I left, I'd had enough of her."

In the book Neighbours: The First 10 Years, author Josephine Monroe described Beth as a "country girl" at heart who went on a journey during her time in the show. Beth came to Ramsay Street in search of a new life, having been abused by her stepfather, Keith. Monroe described Beth as a "principled and sweet-natured girl". She was portrayed as a virgin desperate to shed her innocence after Annalise Hartman's (Kimberley Davies) harsh words. Beth was often portrayed as being "terrified" of sex because she was sexually abused by her stepfather, Keith. After she came across as over keen and desperate, on different occasions asked Brad Willis (Scott Michaelson) to sleep with her, later begging him to stay with her.

=== Relationships ===
Beth's main relationship was with Brad, their relationship was a long-running storyline, it started when Brad was dating Lucy Robinson (Melissa Bell). Beth was jealous and she showed her strong side of her personality when she began competing with Lucy for Brad's affections. Through Brad, Beth was portrayed at times begging and pleading for him to stay with her. They later married and left the serial. Brad ultimately chooses to remain with Lucy and Beth has to accept that she has lost Brad. Beth decides to move on quickly, with producers creating an unconventional romance for Beth with Rod Baker (Chris Lloyds). The storyline was controversial because Rod is a Vietnam war veteran and is twenty years older than Beth. Given Rod's age, other characters disapprove of their relationship. They express their concerns and opinions that Beth would be better suited to someone her own age. Writers quickly developed Beth's new romance and they soon become engaged. Rod wants to consummate their relationship and invites Beth to his hotel room for sex. Beth has to decide whether she is ready for such a commitment. Imbruglia sympathised with her character's predicament but defended Beth and Rod's romance. She told a reporter from TVTimes of her belief that age differences should not matter and there was "nothing wrong" with romancing an older man. Imbruglia added "it all depends on attitude [...] it's what's in the mind that counts." Beth decides she cannot commit to Rod and decides to end their engagement.

Lucy decides to move to Singapore without Brad, leaving him devastated. Bell had decided to leave the series and this left production with the opportunity to develop Beth and Brad's romance. Some of Beth's scenes referenced the sexual abuse she had endured in her backstory. The experiences left her with trust issues and she remains a virgin. Imbruglia told Daphne Lockyer from Woman that "as a result she's never been able to have sex because she's terrified, she's actually still a virgin." Writers committed to portraying the issue sensitively. Beth's fears about sex are conveyed when she turns down a date with construction worker John Bridges (Matthew Smith). Imbruglia told a reporter from TVTimes that Keith's abusive ways made her have a "mental block about sex". She is "curious" and "terrified" at the same time. She decides to confide about her issues with Brad, who encourages her to give John a chance. He offers her advice and tips which she takes too literally and ends up propositioning John with sex. He refuses Beth's but she does not let it lower her confidence. She then realises that she should ask Brad instead. Imbruglia declared that Beth's offer to Brad is the "biggest surprise of his life". She defended her character's actions stating "there's no reason she shouldn't" because "Beth is being very sensible". Beth chooses Brad because she thinks he will be "gentle and thoughtful on this very important occasion."

Imbruglia believed that with Brad, her character had finally found someone she "can really love and trust." Writers created scenes in which Beth decides she is ready to have sex and propositions Brad. He ultimately turns her down. Michaelson was surprised when he read the scripts and learned that Brad would be respectful. Michaelson told producers of his worries that viewers may think Brad is homosexual for refusing sex. He told Lockyer that he thought it was a "daring" story for Neighbours to take on so "they couldn't have them leaping into bed together immediately." They later consummate their relationship in a workman's caravan. Michaelson praised the show for modernising itself and not avoiding the issue like it once did. He added that "it's a lot more realistic" and Imbruglia opined that "what matters is the subject is handled responsibly." Writers ensured the scenes were factual and educative, with Beth and Brad discussing sexual transmitted diseases and Brad using a condom. Michaelson said that despite its preaching, the scenes are "tender, funny and moving." He enjoyed working with Imbruglia on the storyline and was so proud that he branded it "the best work either of us have ever done".

Writers decided that Beth and Brad would get engaged. The story begins when Brad buys Beth a friendship ring. She mistakenly assumes it is an engagement ring and he is forced to propose. Brad begins an affair with Lauren Carpenter (Sarah Vandenbergh). Beth could not forgive him and left him on his wedding day. Imbruglia did not think that Beth handled the situation in a "realistic way", but thought it "makes good drama" for a soap opera. Brad's relationship with Lauren soon ended and they began to date other people to make each other jealous.

After some time off-screen, Beth returns and begins dating school teacher Wayne Duncan (Jonathan Sammy-Lee). Their relationship begins after their friends expect Beth to reconcile with Brad. He is so determined to prove them wrong that he sets up a date between Wayne and Beth. However, Brad never intended for Wayne to fall in love with Beth. Seeing Beth happy with another man makes Brad realises what he has lost. Writers then played Brad vying to win back Beth's affections. Imbruglia told Soap's Manson that "it was all a bit of a love triangle." They begin competing and both propose marriage to Beth, which leaves her emotionally confused. Imbruglia told Donna Hay from What's on TV that "most girls would be thrilled to be wooed by just one of these groovy fellas. And here's Beth with two of them!" Beth eventually decides to give Brad another chance. Imbruglia claimed that she always knew Brad was not serious about a future with Lauren. She added "deep down we knew they'd always get back together. It was really just a fling for Brad."

=== Departure ===
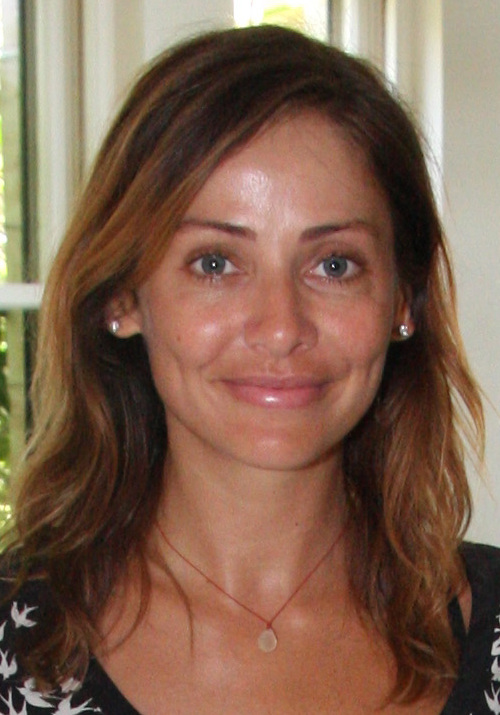
Imbruglia left the show because she was disappointed with scripts.

Imbruglia found being a celebrity uncomfortable and when she became disappointed by the scripts given to her, she asked the producers to write her out. In another interview, Imbruglia stated "sometimes I think 'give me my life back!' I do have a problem with it. Before Neighbours I was the same as any other kid. But people often can't make the distinction between the person and the character." In the episodes leading to her departure, Beth is offered an apprenticeship in Perth. Brad is upset at the prospect of her being so far away and asks her to marry him. Their family and friends are excited and begins to make arrangements. This overwhelms the couple and they make secret plans to elope. When Brad's family discover their plan, they track them down to a bus terminal. They convince them to return to Ramsay Street and marry in front of their friends. Imbruglia's departure storyline coincided with Michaelson's and it featured Beth and Brad deciding to move to Perth after their wedding. Typical to their characterisation, Beth already has a new job planned for her in Perth but Brad does not. Imbruglia briefly reprised the role for three weeks in 1994. The storyline saw Beth return to Erinsborough to meet Gaby Willis's (Rachel Blakely) newborn son. Beth also announces that she is pregnant with her first child. Imbruglia turned down an offer to return full-time, but she said she was open to making a few guest appearances. In 1997, Imbruglia revealed that she had no creative control over what happened to Beth. In 1998, Imbruglia stated that after leaving Neighbours, she spent twelve months feeling "bitter and twisted" about the creative differences she experienced with the show's production. Imbruglia revealed that her opinion of her Neighbours experience had changed, recalling "fond memories" and being grateful that the show helped to begin her career.

=== Return ===
Imbruglia was asked to take part in the show's 20th anniversary celebrations, but she declined. When asked about a return to Neighbours she said "I'll always be grateful to the show for launching my career, but I wouldn't want to revisit that time." In 2021, Imbruglia was asked about Beth's son, Ned Willis (Ben Hall), during an interview with Behnaz Akhgar on BBC Radio Wales. Imbruglia was shocked and thanked Akhgar, but admitted she was unaware of the fact. She branded it "brilliant" and added that when she watches Neighbours, she feels "freaked" because it is "like other people are in my house." Imbruglia found the way she discovered her character has a son "hysterical".

Upon the announcement that the serial would be concluding in 2022, Imbruglia and her friend, Holly Valance (who played Felicity Scully), brainstormed a way to incorporate themselves into the finale and approached producers with an idea, which they accepted. Their scenes were filmed in London in one day and they both appeared on screen on 28 July 2022, despite their characters never having crossed paths during their original stints.

In an interview with Angela Bishop of Studio 10, Imbruglia and Valance explained they wanted their returns to be a random surprise. Imbruglia called her character's introduction "incredible" and said it was a good experience working on a show that was so popular in Australia and the United Kingdom. She also said that she enjoyed the friendships she had made while on the serial. Imbruglia chose the build-up to Beth and Brad's wedding as her favourite storyline because "I think because I was so young and every girl dreams of, you know, wearing a white dress, it was amazing to have that fantasy and be able to play that out." She chose the love triangle between Beth, Brad and Lauren as her most fun to portray. Imbruglia concluded that she learned a lot from Neighbours, including her realisation she wanted to live in the UK following the show's success.

== Storylines ==
Beth was born in the countryside and grew up with her brother David (Simon Stokes). Beth's father, Bill died when she was young and her mother, Phyllis "Bunny" Lawson was left to raise them alone. When Beth was sixteen, her mother started a relationship with a new man, Keith, and he eventually moved in with the family. He started to sexually abuse Beth, so she and David fled to start a new life elsewhere. In surfers paradise Beth meets Brad Wilis, Lucy Robinson and Josh Anderson (Jeremy Angerson). Josh and Brad try to win Beth's affections, but she turns them down because of her lack of trust in males. Bunny arrives and takes Beth and David home. Beth later visits Lucy in Ramsay Street. She decides to stay after she falls in love with Brad. Lucy then decides she loves Brad too, Brad chooses Lucy leaving Beth upset. Beth starts working in the Coffee Shop but she decides it isn't the right job for her. She starts working as an apprentice builder with Brad's father Doug (Terence Donovan). Beth then finds it hard to cope working with so many males, she thinks about leaving the job and it is made worse when Buzz Wade (Brett Swain) starts bullying her. However Beth decides to carry on and proves everyone wrong.

Beth leaves to see Bunny marry Ken Lawson, when she returns to Ramsay Street, Beth shocks her friends by revealing she is engaged to Rod Baker (Chris Lloyds) who is in his forties. Everyone thinks the relationship is moving too fast and refused to accept Rod because he is twice her age. Beth ignores their worries but when Rod wants to take their relationship to the next level Beth realises she isn't ready to sleep with anyone yet, citing her abuse as a child as the cause of this. Rod is annoyed and doesn't want to be with her and leaves Ramsay Street. Lucy decides she wants to be a model and leaves. Brad is left devastated, but Beth sees it as her opportunity to be with him, but he just wants to be friends. Beth begs Brad to sleep with her, claiming it shall be easier with him and wants her first time to be with someone she trusts, he turns her down. Whilst out working for Doug, Brad and Beth are forced to share a caravan for the night. They end up sleeping together. They fall in love and start a relationship. As their relationship progresses they decide to become engaged.

After living with the Robinsons for a while, Julie Martin (Julie Mullins) and her family return, so Beth decides to go and live with Cameron Hudson (Benjamin Grant Mitchell). They are evicted and have to move in with Lou Carpenter (Tom Oliver), where Beth becomes good friends with Lauren. Lauren, Beth and Brad start to spend much time together. Beth is unaware that Lauren and Brad have become more than just good friends and are sleeping together. Bunny (now Brenda Addie) arrives and takes a dislike to Brad, but chooses to give him a chance for Beth's sake. On her wedding day Beth begins to suspect that something was going on between Brad and Lauren, when she asks him, Brad comes clean about their affair. Beth decides she cannot stay and flees to work for her mum on her farm.

Beth later decides to return to Ramsay Street to get her life back together. She acknowledges her love for Brad but states she will never be able to trust him again. She decides to move in with Mark Gottlieb (Bruce Samazan) and Philip Martin (Ian Rawlings) also moves in with them after he splits up with Julie. Beth and Philip begin a relationship but Philip's daughters Hannah (Rebecca Ritters) and Debbie Martin (Marnie Reece-Wilmore) do not approve of their relationship and try to make it hard for them. Philip later realizes he is still in love with Julie and he returns to her after splitting with Beth. Beth then has a short-lived relationship with Wayne.

Lucy returns and decides to try to get Brad and Beth back together. They avoid each other and deny they want to get back together. As time goes by many of their friends try to convince them to reconcile, in the end they get back together. They decide to try to get remarried. The Willis family are delighted by their plans and everyone helps organise their wedding. On their wedding day they decide to start a new life elsewhere, they marry in a registry office and afterwards they get on a bus leaving Ramsay Street. Their parents track them down after following the bus but Brad and Beth do not tell them they are already married. They then return to the street and have a second ceremony at Number 26. Brad and Beth then leave for their new life in Perth. Beth returns the following year to visit Brad's nephew, Zac Willis (Jay Callahan) at his naming day ceremony.

Twenty-eight years later, Beth sees Karl Kennedy's (Alan Fletcher) musical appeal for contributions to the Ramsay Street history on Facebook. Felicity Scully (Holly Valance) also sees the video and she and Beth both realize that they are former residents of the street. They send a video to Toadie Rebecchi (Ryan Moloney) and Melanie Pearson (Lucinda Cowden) for their wedding.

== Reception ==
British newspaper The Daily Telegraph included Imbruglia and Beth in their Top five ex-'Neighbours' stars list in 2002. In 2010, to celebrate Neighbours' 25th anniversary, British satellite broadcasting company Sky profiled 25 characters of which they believed were the most memorable in the series history. Beth is in the list and describing they state: "Beth was something of a retread of Charlene – she was a tomboy, eventually becoming a builder's apprentice; her young love with the hunk du jour made her well loved; and she left the show to pursue a music career (well, playing Torn until the end of time). Beth and Brad were an inevitable, sunny couple who positively radiated vitamins, but let's not forget the brief period she dated a recently bereaved Phil on some paddleboats." They describe her most memorable scenes as being Contending with the sexist atmosphere at her building job; her brief relationship with Phil and marrying surfer Brad. In 2022, Kate Randall from Heat included Beth in the magazine's top ten Neighbours characters of all time feature and branded her a "naïve girlfriend". A writer from Channel 5's Holy Soap website said Imbruglia "melted hearts as dungarees-wearing Beth Brennan". Tom Adair of The Scotsman branded the character a "sweet country lass".

Inside Soap ran a feature compiling "The 100 greatest soap stories ever told". They featured Beth and Brad's wedding story as their 45th choice. Daphne Lockyer of Woman magazine stated "let's be honest, love has always been on the cards for Brad and Beth. From the moment they clapped eyes on each other, there's always been that special something between them." Their colleague, Caro Thompson branded Beth a "poor, put-upon" type of character. June Walton opined that Beth and Brad "must be a wedding photographer's dream. The groom is blonde and bronzed, and the bride, petite and dark with a smile that could illuminate Sydney Harbour Bridge." She believed that their "youth" made them an "attractive couple" and branded Beth a "product of a broken home". Sue Frost (also from Woman) believed that Beth and Brad were not ready for marriage because they had been romantically involved with numerous characters. Though she added "these youngsters have come through a lot and, if they've decided this is what they really want, it could last." A TVTimes writer opined she "may have been game enough to be the only woman working on Doug Willis' construction site in Neighbours, but she's more timid when it comes to sex." What's on TV's Donna Hay stated "it must be hell being Beth Brennan. The poor girl can hardly move for gorgeous men declaring their love for her."

Robin Stringer from the Evening Standard stated that the fictional character Snow White was as "sweet natured as Beth Brennan". Louise Manson from Soap opined "Beth has always been the goody two-shoes of Neighbours and even Natalie agrees her character is too sickly." Joanna Murray-Smith writing for The Age praised Imbruglia's performances as Beth. She opined that Imbruglia was one of seven actors on the show that gave "real dignity to soap acting". Her colleagues Everett True and Shirley Rodell-Szyzmyjec branded Beth the show's "construction worker and heart-breaker". A journalist from The Guardian branded the character "bashful Beth" and "the darling of Ramsay Street". Jonathan Bernstein of the Kenosha News branded the character "a country lass turned construction worker". Lee Yackeren from the Centre Daily Times wrote that Imbruglia's remained in the show because the character "became popular". British singer Chris Martin from the band Coldplay has admitted he was a big fan of the character stating "I was totally fixated by this one character, Beth. I really fell in love with her." Hiyah Zaidi from NationalWorld branded Beth "the world's most glamorous builder's mate" and Imbruglia one of the show's "most popular stars in the 1990s."

In July 2002, Beth was inducted into All About Soap's "Soap Hall of Fame". Writer Lisa Marks described Beth as the "wholesome girl next door", "girly" and a "country gal" who is "sweet-natured". Marks believed that Beth was "brave" for overcoming the abuse committed by her step-father and that Brad was attracted to her "mix of vulnerability and bravery".
