= Bruce Samazan =

Australian actor

- Born: 13 November 1970 (age 56); Madagascar
- Occupations: Actor, real estate agent
- Years active: 1989–2020
- Known for: E Street (TV series); Neighbours (TV series); Home and Away (TV series)
- Children: 2

Bruce Samazan (born 13 November 1970) is an Australian actor. He perhaps best known for being the only male actor to have played regular roles in Australia's "Big Three" soap operas of the 1990s: E Street, Neighbours, and Home and Away. He won a Logie Award in 1992 and released a rap single in 1993. After he gave up acting in 2000, Samazan worked as a real estate agent.

== Early and personal life ==
Samazan was born in Malagasy in 1970 to a French father and English mother. He and his parents moved to Australia in 1973 due to a coup in the country. He holds dual French and Australian citizenship. Samazan grew up in Stanwell Park with his mother and three sisters. He attended Bulli High School.

Samazan had a few modelling jobs when he was younger. In 1987, he competed in the Wollongong Model of the Year contest, but came second to Ashley Paske, who went onto become an actor in Richmond Hill and Neighbours. Samazan later became a brickie's labourer. In 1990, just as Samazan's acting career was beginning, the French Government ordered him to go to France for compulsory military national service. However, Samazan was able to prove his Australian citizenship and stay in the country.

Samazan lives in Noosa Heads with his wife and two daughters.

== Career ==
In 1989, Samazan accompanied his girlfriend to an audition for a part in the Network Ten soap E Street. He was asked to try out too, but neither he or his girlfriend landed a role. However, the casting director liked Samazan enough to invite him to attend a six-week acting course. Samazan auditioned again and was offered the role of new character Max Simmons, a new recruit at the community police station. Introduced early in Season 2, his role was primarily comic relief, but with the addition of ruthless killer Sonny Bennett to proceedings, E Street's storylines grew darker and the character of Max became more central and balanced. In 1992, Samazan won the Logie Award for Most Popular Actor.

By the beginning of 1993, E Street's popularity had dwindled and the producers became more and more desperate to lure viewers. This resulted in one of the soap's more outrageous plots which involved Samazan's character Max turning into a werewolf. Although this scene was part of a dream sequence, it was at this point that the tabloid media began to speculate that E Street had "jumped the shark", and the series was cancelled in May 1993. Samazan stayed with the show until the final episode. His character fell in love with Bonnie Tait (Melissa Bell) who awoke from a coma just in time to see the final credits sequence.

In mid-1993, Samazan released the rap music single "One of a Kind" under the pseudonym B-Man Samazan on the Westside Records label. He filmed a music video for the song with Kellie Crawford from Teen Queens (and later of Hi-5 fame). The song peaked at No. 80 on the ARIA Charts in June 1993. Samazan's Neighbours co-star Scott Michaelson went on record during a 2003 court case saying Samazan had been lucky his song did not get too much airplay because it was "particularly bad".

After the demise of E Street, Samazan was immediately cast in Network Ten's other major soap series, Neighbours. He played Mark Gottlieb, brother of established character Stephen Gottlieb (Lochie Daddo). Samazan also hosted ABC's country music television show Stampede, which began airing in February 1994. Samazan regularly flew from Melbourne, where he was filming Neighbours, to Brisbane to host the show.

From Neighbours, he went straight into the Seven Network's Home and Away for a six-month guest stint as the psychotic Brad Cooper who raped Chloe Richards (Kristy Wright). He had previously guested on the serial as Mick in 1989 for four episodes.

In 1998, Samazan became a presenter on Network Ten's home improvement show Bright Ideas. He also appeared in guest roles in Big Sky and Head Start, followed by a role in the 1998 thriller film Game Room with Melissa Tkautz. Samazan returned to Neighbours in 2020, reprising his role as Mark Gottlieb for the show's 35th anniversary.

== Post-acting career ==
After giving up acting in 2000, Samazan worked as a real estate agent in Wollongong and Helensburgh. He then spent 11 years working in digital marketing for Realestate.com.au, before moving on to work for downsizing.com, which focuses on retirement villages.

Samazan Pty Ltd, a company registered in 1991 which was directed by Samazan, was deregistered in late 2008.

== Discography ==
=== Singles ===
List of singles, with selected chart positions
Title	Year	Peak chart positions
Title	Year	AUS
"One of a Kind"	1993	80
