= Pam Willis =

Fictional character from the Australian soap opera Neighbours

- Neighbours character
- Portrayed by: Sue Jones
- Duration: 1990–1994, 1996, 2014, 2016
- First appearance: 6 August 1990
- Last appearance: 19 April 2016
- Introduced by: Don Battye (1990); Bill Searle (1996); Jason Herbison (2014)
In-universe information
- Occupation: Nurse
- Family: Willis
- Father: Seamus Beresford
- Mother: Moina Beresford
- Husband: Doug Willis (1967–2016)
- Sons: Adam Willis; John Willis; Brad Willis
- Daughters: Gaby Willis; Cody Willis
- Grandsons: Zac Willis; Ned Willis; Josh Willis
- Granddaughters: Paige Smith; Imogen Willis; Piper Willis; Roxy Willis

Pam Willis is a fictional character from the Australian soap opera Neighbours, played by Sue Jones. Pam was introduced by executive producer Don Battye as the matriarch of the newly introduced Willis family. Jones initially turned down an offer to appear in the show, before changing her mind. She was cast as Pam after a screen test. She made her first screen appearance during the episode broadcast on 6 August 1990.

Pam was a district nurse and a highly valued member of the community. Pam and her husband, Doug (Terence Donovan) had a solid marriage until they began to neglect each other due to work. Pam also came close to having an affair with their neighbour Jim Robinson (Alan Dale), while Doug had a one-night stand with Jill Weir (Lyn Semler). Pam was involved in a storyline surrounding the subject of mercy killing in 1992. She was accused of murdering Garth Kirby (Roy Baldwin), a seriously ill patient, but eventually her name was cleared.

The character departed on 15 September 1994, after she and Doug were written out of the show. Two years later, Jones briefly reprised her role during Peta Brady's exit storyline and departed on 1 April 1996. In 2014, it was announced Jones had reprised her role once again and Pam returned on 5 May 2014. She returned again on 15 April 2016.

== Development ==
=== Casting and characterisation ===
Sue Jones initially rejected the offer to appear in Neighbours, as she was worried that she would be "selling her theatrical soul". After losing a part in a play, she changed her mind. She was given the role of Pam after attending a screen test.

Upon her introduction, Pam was a full-time mother to her four children: Adam (Ian Williams), Gaby (Rachel Blakely), Brad (Scott Michaelson) and Cody (Amelia Frid). Shortly after settling into Ramsay Street, Pam decided to return to nursing and after re-qualifying, she was given a job at the local hospital, where her duties often meant she got involved in difficult situations. Through her job, Pam often interacted with other characters and she became "a trusted and central figure" within the community. Pam was even-tempered, a member of the school committee and an active sportswoman. She was anxious that her eldest son, Adam, completed his studies, so he could study medicine.

=== Marriage to Doug Willis ===
In her fictional backstory, Pam met her future husband Doug Willis (Terence Donovan) when he accepted a dare to travel naked across town in the taxi she was driving. Pam loved Doug's "wicked" sense of humour. The couple went through several crises. They were faced with "a terrible blow" when their second child, John died due to cot death. They also faced financial problems when the building trade slumped and they briefly split due to an argument.

Pam and Doug's solid marriage soon ran into trouble when they began to neglect each other. Doug was devoting his time to his construction business, while Pam's job as a district nurse gave her increasing independence. Jones said that because Pam and Doug had been neglecting one another for a while, she was not surprised that they were having problems. When Pam nursed Jim Robinson (Alan Dale) through his heart problems, she became attracted to him. Meanwhile, Doug had attracted the unwelcome attentions of Jill Weir (Lyn Semler) and they had a one-night stand. Jill becomes obsessed with Doug and wants a relationship. When she tells other residents that she and Doug will set up home together, he informs Pam about his affair. The confession shocks Pam, but she is "amazed and extremely hurt" when Doug tells her he was unfaithful because of her association with Jim. Pam retaliates by forcing Doug to move out of their house. Jones enjoyed acting out Pam and Doug's marriage problems, saying "It's great to have a really meaty storyline." Jones believed that it the marriage was worth saving and hoped the couple would sort things out. The actress added "They might even end up with a stronger relationship than they had before."

The duo's marital issues continued during 1994. Pam tries everything she can to keep her family united. But the situation worsens when Doug begins heavy drinking upon discovering that he gained his Lassiter's job out of sympathy. While Pam was going through menopause, she began to feel that Doug was not paying her enough attention. Her spirits were raised when she met Tom Weaver (George Mallaby) at an art class. Tom made his interest in Pam clear from the start and he eventually confronted her in front of Doug – even going as far as to ask her to marry him. A "horrified" Doug refused to believe that nothing had happened between Pam and Tom, and he temporarily moved out.

=== Murder accusation ===
In 1992, Pam was accused of murdering her patient, Garth Kirby (Roy Baldwin). Pam often visited Garth at his home in her capacity as a district nurse. Garth suffered from a serious lung infection and had to use an oxygen mask to breathe. When he asked Pam to help him die, she turned him down, but he was later found dead and it was assumed that Pam was responsible. Jones said "It's a dreadful time for Pam. She's the backbone of the Willis family, and has become stronger and stronger since she's gone out to work and established her own identity. But when she's up for murder, she nearly crumbles." Jones explained that as all of the evidence pointed to her, most people believed she was guilty – even Doug had his doubts and there did not seem like there was a way to clear her name.

Jones was pleased to be given "a gripping" storyline and stated that the subject of mercy killing was very important. The actress was unsure what she would do if someone asked her to help them die, saying that it would depend on the circumstances. On-screen, Doug's lawyer nephew Cameron Hudson (Benjamin Mitchell) was introduced and came to Pam's aid when he agreed to represent her. Jones observed that what Pam was going to go through would "test her nerves", but she was lucky that Cameron was on her side to help her through. Mitchell added that Pam's chances were "pretty good".

=== Departure and returns ===
By mid-September 1994, Doug, Pam and Cody were the only members of the Willis family left in the show. Doug and Pam were written out and replaced by the new five-strong Kennedy family. The couple left Erinsborough for Darwin when Doug was offered some building work with the hotel run by Gaby. In 1996, Jones returned to Neighbours for Peta Brady's exit from the show. Brady played Pam's youngest child, Cody, who was shot and left in a critical condition. The actresses had not worked together since Jones's departure two years prior and Brady commented "It was just like old times. We didn't stop talking!"

On 9 April 2014, it was announced that Jones had reprised her role for a guest stint. Of returning to Neighbours, Jones said "It's been a lovely experience to return to Neighbours to see some of the familiar faces and, of course, meet a lot of new ones." Her return aired from 5 May 2014. Pam's returned to Ramsay Street to visit her husband, while he was staying with Brad and his family. Pam wanted to confront Doug as she was convinced that he had been having an affair due to his secretive behaviour. When Pam was told that Doug had Alzheimer's disease she initially refused to believe the diagnosis, but the couple were soon reunited as they faced up to Doug's condition. Pam made another return on 15 April 2016, following Doug's death.

== Storylines ==
Shortly after Pam and Doug purchase Number 28 from Des Clarke (Paul Keane), they are invited to dine with Beverly Marshall (Shaunna O'Grady) and her husband Jim Robinson. When Doug's flirting with Beverley angers Jim, Pam quickly defuses the situation by explaining that she is aware of her husband's flirtatious nature. The family quickly settle in and Pam soon returns to nursing. She is delighted when Adam and Cody both agree to follow her into medicine. Adam and Cody leave home within a year but Pam and Doug are pleased when Brad and Gaby return.

Pam begins caring for Doug's friend, Garth Kirby, who is suffering from a terminal illness. Garth asks Pam to help end his suffering, but she refuses. When Pam returns the following day, she is horrified to find Garth dead. An autopsy reveals Garth overdosed on his medication and Pam is formally charged by the police, who believe she killed him. Doug's nephew, Cameron Hudson, arrives to defend Pam in court and realises that she left her bag unattended long enough for Garth to steal the medication and end his own life. Pam is cleared of all charges, but her supervisor at the hospital Gail Williams (Hilary Henshaw) gives her a hard time.

Jim develops feelings for Pam following a working relationship on a fundraiser. When he admits to having feelings for her she does not reciprocate. But Doug becomes paranoid because of their newfound closeness. Then Pam learns that Doug has had a one-night stand with Jill Weir and throws him out. Pam seeks comfort from Jim and they kiss, only to have Gaby witness it. Doug and Brad go missing while out to sea, but when they are found alive, Pam reconciles with Doug.

Pam clashes with Lauren Carpenter (Sarah Vandenbergh), after she begins dating Brad, who cheated on his fiancée Beth Brennan (Natalie Imbruglia), with her. Pam's relationship with Brad is further tested when she discovers he has a gambling problem and Brad moves in with Lauren and her father Lou (Tom Oliver). However, Brad and Pam patch up their differences before Brad leaves on a cruise ship for several months. Just before Brad and Beth reunite and relocate to Perth, Cody returns rom her US scholarship and Pam notices a change in her mood. This stems from the fact Cody's marriage to Drew Grover (Christopher Kirby) has ended and a lot of her old friends have since moved on (or in the case of her ex-boyfriend Todd Landers died). Cody's relationship with the recently paroled Michael Martin (Troy Beckwith) causes a rift between Pam and Michael's stepmother Julie (Julie Mullins).

Pam becomes a grandmother when Gaby gives birth to Zac (Jay Callahan). Gaby leaves to become manager of Lassiter's Hotel in Darwin and Pam and Doug eventually decide to move up there too. When Cody is shot during a siege between police and drug dealers, Pam hurries back to Erinsborough to be by her bedside. Karl (Alan Fletcher) and Susan Kennedy (Jackie Woodburne) invite Pam to enjoy dinner in her old home. Pam visits Cody that evening and it seems as if she may make a full recovery, but Cody suddenly goes into cardiac arrest. Cody is rushed into theatre, but dies after the surgeons fail to remove a blood clot on her lungs. Pam and all of Cody's friends are devastated by her death. Pam arranges for Cody's funeral to be held in Darwin much to the chagrin of her friends and neighbours, but a memorial service is held for her at Lassiter's Lake. Pam then returns home after saying goodbye to Ramsay Street for the last time.

Eighteen years later, Pam returns to Erinsborough at the request of Doug and Brad. During his visit to Brad, Doug was diagnosed with early onset Alzheimer's disease. Pam does not accept the diagnosis and believes Doug is actually having an affair because of his odd behaviour. Karl manages to convince Pam that Doug really does have Alzheimer's and she accepts that her husband needs her help. Pam tells Brad that she is worried how she will deal with Doug's condition in the future, especially when he starts to forget her. Brad and Terese (Rebekah Elmaloglou) invite Doug and Pam to move in, but they reject the offer to go travelling instead.

Pam returns to Erinsborough following the deaths of Doug and her grandson Josh (Harley Bonner). Pam is hostile towards Brad's eldest son Ned (Ben Hall) and later explains to Lauren that Ned was in a gang that robbed her home and injured her in the process. She did not tell Brad as Doug asked her not to. Ned later confesses to Brad and stays away from Josh's wake in order to spare Pam's feelings. Lauren (now Kate Kendall) convinces Pam to forgive Ned and she apologises, revealing that she was taking her grief over Doug's death out on him. Pam then returns to Darwin to prepare for Doug's funeral later in the week.

== Reception ==
Author Josephine Monroe praised Pam in her book Neighbours: The First 10 Years, stating "A real salt-of-the-earth-type. Pam could always be relied on to help out, especially if it benefited one of her four children." A writer for the BBC's official Neighbours website stated that Pam's most notable moment was "Kicking Doug out of the house after having he told her about his affair with Jill Weir." Simon Hughes from The Age believed Jones "was wasted on Neighbours." During a feature on the show, Anna Pickard from The Guardian tried to choose the characters she would be most starstruck by if she met them. She said "It would have to be the Willis family. All of them. Pam, Doug, Adam, Gaby, Brad and Cody". Robin Darke for So So Gay included Pam in his Top 10 Neighbours Women of All Time feature and he opined:

"Pam Willis embodied the grounded, family-based drama that kept people coming back time and time again. The matriarch of a family of six – with Doug, Adam, Gaby, Brad and Cody – Pam was a tough cookie and was very family orientated. She would stand her corner and help anyone out if they needed her, but it was the day-to-day troubles that the Willis's faced that resonated with viewers."

Michael Cregan of Inside Soap expressed his love for Pam, saying "It's been a tragic time for the Willis family, but the one silver lining is that it's brought Neighbours legend Pam back to our screens again as she says her farewells to grandson Josh." Pam was placed at number twenty-eight on the Huffpost's "35 greatest Neighbours characters of all time" feature. Journalist Adam Beresford stated that in regards to the Willis family, Pam "was the best of the bunch". He described her as a "salt of the earth type who adored her children" but "no pushover and would happily take on anybody."
