= Simone Robertson =

Australian actress (born 1976)

Simone Robertson (born 28 May 1975) is an Australian actress, known for her roles as Phoebe Gottlieb in the television soap opera Neighbours from 1991 until 1993, and Monique Fairbairn in Breakers.

== Early and personal life ==
Robertson was born on 28 May 1975 in Sydney, Australia. Her sister is actress Aimee Robertson, known for her role as Melissa Drenth in Neighbours. Robertson attended Aquinas College. She is also a trained jazz and tap dancer.

Robertson dated her Neighbours co-star Benjamin Grant Mitchell (who played Cameron Hudson). They were already friends, having met on the set of another television series, but did not start a relationship until they met again at a charity event.

She is married to actor Jean-Marc Russ and they live in New York City.

== Career ==
Robertson began acting when she was twelve years old. She appeared in the 1990 film Father, and had guest parts in Skirts and Kelly.

In 1991, Robertson joined the supporting cast of Neighbours as Phoebe Bright. The role was initially a five-week guest stint, but Robertson was promoted to the main cast in early 1992. Of securing the role, she stated "I've been acting for six years, working towards something like this. When I was offered the part, I knew right away I should do it." Phoebe was initially very introverted and a nerd, but Robertson said viewers liked that she was different. The character's notable storylines included a romance with Todd Landers (Kristian Schmid), a teenage pregnancy, Todd's death while he was on the way to stop her from having an abortion, giving birth to their daughter, and marriage to Stephen Gottlieb (Lochie Daddo).

After leaving Neighbours, Robertson struggled to find acting work, so she returned to school and also began working as an assistant manager of a video store. After 18 months of working in the shop and six months before getting her VCE, she was offered the role of Monique Fairbairn in the Network Ten series Breakers. She doubted her chances of winning the role when she auditioned, but said she was "absolutely thrilled" when she was cast. She then had to relocate from Melbourne to Sydney in three days to begin filming. Her character was a single mother who ran a modelling school.

In 2001, Robertson made a guest appearance in Home and Away, alongside her friend and former Breakers co-star Ada Nicodemou.

== Filmography ==
=== Film ===
- Father (1990).... Rebecca Winton

=== Television ===
- Pugwall's Summer (1991).... Rochelle
- Neighbours (1991–1993).... Phoebe Gottlieb
- Breakers (1998).... Monique Fairbairn
- Water Rats (2000) 1 Episode.... Andrea Tell
- The Lost World (2001) 1 Episode.... Empress Centuria
- Home and Away (2001) 3 Episodes.... Desiree Upton
- Corridors of Power (2001) 1 Episode.... Annika
- Head Start (2001) 1 Episode.... Abby
- All Saints (2001) 1 Episode.... Bridget Farrier
