= Sarah Vandenbergh =

Australian actress

- Born: Sarah Vandenbergh; 9 October 1972 (age 53); Sydney, Australia
- Occupations: Actress and presenter

Sarah Vandenbergh (born 9 October 1972 in Sydney, Australia) is an Australian actress and presenter.

== Career ==
Vandenbergh played the original role of Lauren Carpenter in Neighbours, 1993–94, and Kerri in Hollyoaks in 1999. She was also a presenter on Fully Booked from 1996 to 1997 and appeared in the guest role of Lana Hemmings in Holby City. Later, appeared as a nun in short film Fancy Dress and as student Cassie Sanderson in Inbetweeners, a film about the British student experience. In 2006, she guest starred in an episode of McLeod's Daughters.

Today, Vandenbergh presents for TVSN, an Australian television shopping network.

== Personal life ==
Vandenbergh is married with two children.
