= Scott Michaelson =

Australian actor and talent manager

- Born: 12 September 1968 (age 57); Melbourne, Victoria, Australia
- Occupations: Actor, talent manager
- Years active: 1991–1999
- Known for: Neighbours; Paradise Beach

Scott Michaelson (born 12 September 1968) is an Australian retired actor and talent manager known for playing Brad Willis in Neighbours from 1991 until 1993, Chris Quinn in Paradise Beach, and Dean Gregson in The New Adventures of Flipper. After he quit acting in 1999, Michaelson became a talent manager and his clients included actors Kimberley Davies, Nicola Charles and Holly Valance.

== Early life ==
Michaelson was born on 12 September 1968 in Melbourne. He worked as both a stockbroker and builder's labourer, before pursuing an acting career.

== Career ==
Michaelson began acting in television commercials when he was 15. He appeared as an extra in Neighbours in 1985 and then as a school child in 1988. Michaelson quit university, where he was in his final year of an accountancy degree, to join the main cast of Neighbours as Brad Willis in 1991. The character had previously appeared in two episodes played by Benjamin Grant Mitchell, who went on to play Brad's cousin Cameron Hudson. Brad was notable for dating and eventually marrying the character of Beth Brennan, played by Natalie Imbruglia. For his portrayal of Brad, Michaelson was nominated for the Logie Award for Most Popular Actor at the 1993 Logie Awards. He also received a nomination for Hottest Man in Soap at the Inside Soap TV Awards, while Brad was nominated for Best Male Character. When the character was reintroduced in 2013, the show's executive producer Richard Jasek considered asking Michaelson to return to the role, but soon learned that he was no longer acting. The role was then recast to Kip Gamblin.

After leaving Neighbours, Michaelson was asked to join the cast of Paradise Beach in the hope that it would give the show a boost amid falling ratings. Michaelson's guest stint as Chris Quinn, a physical education teacher and love interest for Tori (Megan Connolly) began on 13 December 1993. Michaelson told Glen Williams of TV Week that his character was very different from Brad. In 1996, Michaelson guested in the comedy-drama Shark Bay as Fletcher, a private investigator based on Agent Dale Cooper from Twin Peaks. He also joined the main cast of The New Adventures of Flipper for its second season. Michaelson also appeared on the New Zealand television series Shortland Street in 1997.

In early 1999, Michaelson guest starred in Hercules: The Legendary Journeys as the Sun God Apollo. He later played Apollo in Young Hercules, which was filmed in New Zealand. Michaelson also co-owned a bar called Duke on St Kilda Road, which used to be the Duke of Edinburgh Hotel. He also starred in the American television film Sabrina Down Under as the love interest for Sabrina Spellman, played by Melissa Joan Hart. The film was shot on Hamilton Island.

After leaving acting, Michaelson became a talent manager, signing actresses such as Kimberley Davies and Nicola Charles. His most notable client was Holly Valance, who he helped land her role as Felicity Scully on Neighbours in 1999 and subsequently navigate her path towards a recording career. They became involved in a legal battle when Valance fired Michaelson in 2003, and a court ordered her to pay him $350,000 due to breach of contract.

Michaelson is the CEO and co-founder of Smile Elite, a Sydney-based business specialising in real estate brand development. He previously established Melbourne's first solarium tanning salon, and developed the cosmeceutical range, Indio.

== Personal life ==
Michaelson has been an avid surfer since he was 13 years old. In 1992, Michaelson had a skin cancer scare, which required the removal of a mole from his chest.

== Acting credits ==
Year	Title	Role	Notes
1991–1993	Neighbours	Brad Willis	Series regular
1993	Paradise Beach	Chris Quinn	Guest
1996	Shark Bay	Fletcher	Guest
1996–1997	The New Adventures of Flipper	Dean Gregson	Main cast
1997	Shortland Street	Curtis Thompson	
1998	Hercules: The Legendary Journeys	Apollo	Episodes: "Top God", "Reunions"
1998; 1999	Young Hercules	Apollo	Episodes: "Ares on Trial", "Apollo"
1999	Sabrina Down Under	Barnaby	TV movie

== Awards and nominations ==
Year	Award	Category	Work	Result	Ref.
1993	Logie Awards	Most Popular Actor	Neighbours	Nominated	
1993	Inside Soap TV Awards	Hottest Man in Soap	Scott Michaelson	Nominated	
1993	Inside Soap TV Awards	Best Male Character	Brad Willis	Nominated	
1994	Logie Awards	Most Popular Actor	Neighbours	Longlisted	
