= Lochie Daddo =

Australian actor and television presenter

- Born: Christopher Lachlan Daddo; 14 March 1970 (age 56); Sydney, New South Wales Australia
- Occupations: Actor and TV presenter
- Known for: Neighbours (TV series)
- Spouse: Karina Brown
- Children: 2
- Family: Cameron Daddo, Andrew Daddo

Christopher Lachlan "Lochie" Daddo (born 14 March 1970 in Sydney) is an Australian actor, television presenter and reporter and media persnality, he has worked in everything from entertainment news to a current affairs reporting across all major television networks, but is perhap's best known for his stint in the drama series Neighbours.

== Early life ==
Daddo was born in Sydney, New South Wales on 14 March 1970 to parents Peter and Bronwen Daddo. The youngest of five children, he grew up in Melbourne on the Mornington Peninsula, alongside sister Belinda, brother Cameron and twin brothers Andrew and Jamie. Cameron and Andrew are fellow actors and television presenters.

After finishing school in Melbourne in 1987, Daddo began a horticulture course and worked as a landscape gardener for six months. His passion for exploration and adventure led him on numerous ventures through the Whitsundays and across Europe.

== Career ==
Upon returning to Australia in 1990, Daddo took up an offer from a modelling agency and soon after, began his television career. He made his debut on ABC music television series Countdown Revolution, before taking on the regular role of Stephen Gottlieb in long-running soap opera Neighbours from 1992 to 1993.

In 1995, he appeared in an episode of ABC medical drama G.P. – "Out", as Patrick Walsh, the romantic interest of the series' regular, gay character Dr. Martin Dempsey, played by Damian Rice. He next had a guest role in soap opera Paradise Beach, playing arrogant ex con Angel Bannister, a love interest for Lisa Barsby, played by Tiffany Lamb.

Daddo also worked as a reporter and presenter for several entertainment news and current affairs series, including Let’s Do It, E! News, Entertainment Tonight, Today and Animal Hospital. He became a host on travel show Getaway during the mid-1990s for six years.

Daddo made a guest appearance in a 2001 episode of comedy series Pizza as Eddie Galah. In 2005, he starred in several episodes of teen drama series Blue Water High, in the role of Andrew. In May 2007, he then appeared as a competitor on the celebrity reality singing TV show It Takes Two, but was the first to be eliminated on 15 May.

For the past two decades, Daddo has run his production company, DPS Media (Daddo Production Services). He has also hosted corporate and training videos for numerous major Australian corporations including Qantas, NRMA, Commonwealth Bank and Telstra as well as a spokesperson for the 40 Hour Famine.

== Personal life ==
Daddo is married to Foxtel's Karina Brown, former Sale of the Century host, with whom he has two daughters.

Daddo currently works as a high-profile real estate agent in Sydney's Palm Beach. He also works as an auctioneer.

== Credits ==
Year	Title	Role	Notes	Ref.
	Countdown Revolution	Presenter		
	Saturday at Rick's	Presenter		
1992	All Together Now	Marcus McConaughey	1 episode	
1992–1993	Neighbours	Stephen Gottlieb	90 episodes	
1994	G.P.	Patrick Walsh	1 episode	
1994	Paradise Beach	Angel Bannister	1 episode	
1994; 2000–2001; 2007	Getaway	Presenter		
	Animal Hospital	Presenter		
2000–2001	E! News	Presenter		
2001	Pizza	Eddie Galah	Episode: "Millionaire Pizza"	
2005–2006	Blue Water High	Andrew	5 episodes	
2007	It Takes Two	Celebrity contestant	Eliminated first	
