= List of Neighbours characters =

Neighbours is a long-running Australian television soap opera that was first broadcast between 18 March 1985 and 11 December 2025. It was created by TV executive Reg Watson, who proposed the idea of making a show that focused on realistic stories and portrayed adults and teenagers who talk openly and solve their problems together. The series primarily centres on the residents of Ramsay Street, a short cul-de-sac in the equally fictitious suburb of Erinsborough. Neighbours began with three households, including the Ramsay and Robinson families. When storylines for certain characters became tired, the scriptwriters simply moved one family out and replaced it with a new one. Ramsay Street thus became a mixture of older characters and newer characters.

The following is a list of regular and otherwise notable characters who appear in the series over its history. Where more than one actor has portrayed a character, the actors are listed in chronological order.

== Characters by alphabetical order ==
=== A ===
Character	Actor(s)	Duration	Ref(s)
Benito Alessi	George Spartels	1992–1993	
Caroline Alessi	Gillian Blakeney	1990–1992, 2019	
Cathy Alessi	Elspeth Ballantyne	1992–1993	
Christina Alessi	Gayle Blakeney	1990–1992, 2019	
Marco Alessi	Felice Arena	1992	
Rick Alessi	Dan Falzon	1992–1995	
Lolly Allen	Tessa Taylor	1994	
Lolly Allen	Jiordan Anna Tolli	1994–2001, 2013	
Lolly Allen	Adelaide Kane	2007	
Josh Anderson	Jeremy Angerson	1990–1992	
Ben Atkins	Brett Cousins	1997–1998	
Caitlin Atkins	Emily Milburn	1997–1998	
Nicholas Atkins	Jason Crewes	1998	

=== B ===
Character	Actor(s)	Duration	Ref(s)
Oliver Barnes	David Hoflin	2007–2008, 2011	
Sarah Beaumont	Nicola Charles	1996–1999, 2005, 2013, 2016	
Tess Bell	Krista Vendy	1999–2001, 2023, 2025	
David Bishop	Kevin Harrington	1988, 2003–2005	
Harold Bishop	Ian Smith	1987–1991, 1996–2009, 2011, 2015, 2022–2025	
Kerry Bishop	Linda Hartley-Clark	1989–1990, 2004, 2006	
Liljana Bishop	Marcella Russo	2003–2005	
Madge Bishop	Anne Charleston	1986–1992, 1996–2001, 2015, 2022	
Serena Bishop	Lara Sacher	2003–2005	
Dee Bliss	Madeleine West	2000–2003, 2017, 2019–2020	
Bossy	Bossy	2012–2016	
Bouncer	Bouncer	1987–1993	
Aaron Brennan	Matt Wilson	2015–2025	
Beth Brennan	Natalie Imbruglia	1992–1994, 2022	
Chloe Brennan	April Rose Pengilly	2018–2023	
Mark Brennan	Scott McGregor	2010–2011, 2013–2020	
Tyler Brennan	Travis Burns	2015–2019	
Phoebe Bright	Simone Robertson	1991–1993	
Georgia Brooks	Saskia Hampele	2012–2016	
Ringo Brown	Sam Clark	2007–2010	
Eddie Buckingham	Bob La Castra	1990	
Dorothy Burke	Maggie Dence	1990–1993	

=== C ===
Character	Actor(s)	Duration	Ref(s)
Jack Callahan	Andrew Morley	2016–2018, 2020	
Carmella Cammeniti	Natalie Blair	2003–2008, 2011	
Chloe Cammeniti	Sarah May	2008	
Chloe Cammeniti	Daisy Zandveld	2011	
Rosetta Cammeniti	Natalie Saleeba	2006–2008	
Sienna Cammeniti	Erin McNaught	2008	
Gary Canning	Damien Richardson	2014–2020	
Kyle Canning	Chris Milligan	2008–2016, 2019–2022	
Levi Canning	Richie Morris	2020–2022, 2025	
Naomi Canning	Morgana O'Reilly	2014–2015, 2020, 2022	
Sheila Canning	Colette Mann	2012–2022	
Xanthe Canning	Lilly Van der Meer	2016–2019	
Guy Carpenter	Andrew Williams	1991–1992, 2015	
Lou Carpenter	Tom Oliver	1988, 1992–2016	
Daphne Clarke	Elaine Smith	1985–1988	
Des Clarke	Paul Keane	1985–1990, 2015, 2020–2022	
Eileen Clarke	Myra De Groot	1985–1988	
Jamie Clarke	S.J. Dey	1987–1988	
Jamie Clarke	Ryder Susman	1989	
Jamie Clarke	Nicholas and James Mason	1989–1990	
Jamie Clarke	Angus McLaren	2003	
Sam Cole	Scott Wealands	1986	
Sam Cole	Thomas Hamston	1986–1987	
Susan Cole	Gloria Ajenstat	1986–1987	
Elly Conway	Kendell Nunn	2001–2002	
Elly Conway	Jodi Anasta	2016–2020, 2022–2023	
Taj Coppin	Jaime Robbie Reyne	2002–2004	

=== D ===
Character	Actor(s)	Duration	Ref(s)
Helen Daniels	Anne Haddy	1985–1997	
Rosemary Daniels	Joy Chambers	1986–1987, 1989–1991, 1993–1998, 2005, 2010	
Bronwyn Davies	Rachel Friend	1988–1990	
Sharon Davies	Jessica Muschamp	1988–1990, 2022–2023	
Zoe Davis	Ally Fowler	1986	
Nikki Dennison	Charlene Fenn	1986	
Haz Devkar	Shiv Palekar	2023–2025	
Glen Donnelly	Richard Huggett	1990–1992, 2021–2022	
Wayne Duncan	Jonathon Sammy-Lee	1993–1994	
Kiri Durant	Gemma Bird Matheson	2022, 2024–2025	

=== E ===
Character	Actor(s)	Duration	Ref(s)
Lisa Elliot	Kate Straub	1997	
Gino Esposito	Claude Stevens	2000	
Gino Esposito	Shane McNamara	2001–2007, 2024–2025	

=== F ===
Character	Actor(s)	Duration	Ref(s)
Daniel Fitzgerald	Brett Tucker	1999–2000, 2007–2010	
Lucas Fitzgerald	Scott Major	2008–2013, 2015–2017, 2019, 2021–2022, 2024–2025	
Samantha Fitzgerald	Simone Buchanan	2008–2010, 2020	
Aidan Foster	Bobby Morley	2011–2013	
Cassandra Freedman	Tottie Goldsmith	2009	
Donna Freedman	Margot Robbie	2008–2011, 2022	

=== G ===
Character	Actor(s)	Duration	Ref(s)
Kirsten Gannon	Nikola Dubois	2007–2008	
Mickey Gannon	Fletcher O'Leary	2007–2009	
Clive Gibbons	Geoff Paine	1986–1987, 1989, 2017–2022	
Hope Gottlieb	Laura Pearson (Note: Played by Louna Maroun in Neighbours vs Zombies (2014))	1993	
Mark Gottlieb	Bruce Samazan	1993–1995, 2020	
Serendipity Gottlieb	Raelee Hill	1994–1995	
Stephen Gottlieb	Lochie Daddo	1992–1993	
Cassius Grady	Joe Davidson	2017–2018	
Amy Greenwood	Jacinta Stapleton	1997–2000, 2005, 2020–2023	
Hendrix Greyson	Ben Turland	2019–2022	
Pierce Greyson	Tim Robards	2018–2020, 2022	
Pierce Greyson	Don Hany	2020–2021	
Will Griggs	Christian Clark	2006–2007	

=== H ===
Character	Actor(s)	Duration	Ref(s)
Emily Hancock	Isabella Oldham	2000–2002	
Evan Hancock	Nicholas Opolski	2001–2002	
Leo Hancock	Josh Jay	2000	
Leo Hancock	Anthony Hammer	2001–2002	
Maggie Hancock	Sally Cooper	2001–2002	
Matt Hancock	Stephen Hunt	2001–2002, 2005	
Jen Handley	Alyce Platt	1995–1996	
Luke Handley	Bernard Curry	1995–1996, 2005	
Mackenzie Hargreaves	Georgie Stone	2019–2025	
Ty Harper	Dean Geyer	2008–2009	
Jane Harris	Annie Jones	1986–1989, 2005, 2018–2025	
Annalise Hartman	Kimberley Davies	1993–1996, 2005, 2025	
Joanna Hartman	Emma Harrison	1995–1997	
Mike Healey	Andrew Blackman	1998–1999	
Boyd Hoyland	Kyal Marsh	2002–2007	
Charlie Hoyland	Aaron Auslebrook-Walker	2006–2008	
Charlie Hoyland	Jacob Brito	2008–2011	
Charlie Hoyland	Alexander McGuire	2016, 2018	
Holly Hoyland	Chaya Broadmore	2007	
Holly Hoyland	Lucinda Armstrong Hall	2013–2014, 2017–2018, 2023–2025	
Izzy Hoyland	Natalie Bassingthwaighte	2003–2007, 2018, 2022	
Max Hoyland	Stephen Lovatt	2002–2007	
Rosie Hoyland	Maggie Millar	2002–2003	
Summer Hoyland	Marisa Siketa	2002–2007	
Summer Hoyland	Jordy Lucas	2010–2013, 2023	
Cameron Hudson	Benjamin Grant Mitchell	1992–1993	
Faye Hudson	Lorraine Bayly	1991–1992	

=== I ===
Character	Actor(s)	Duration	Ref(s)
Terry Inglis	Maxine Klibingaitis	1985	

=== J ===
Character	Actor(s)	Duration	Ref(s)
Melissa Jarrett	Jade Amenta	1989–1991, 2023	

=== K ===
Character	Actor(s)	Duration	Ref(s)
Ajay Kapoor	Sachin Joab	2011–2013	
Priya Kapoor	Menik Gooneratne	2011–2013	
Rani Kapoor	Coco Cherian	2012–2013	
Finn Kelly	Rob Mills	2017–2022	
Billy Kennedy	Jesse Spencer	1994–2000, 2005, 2022	
Karl Kennedy	Alan Fletcher	1994–2025	
Libby Kennedy	Kym Valentine	1994–2005, 2007–2011, 2014, 2022	
Libby Kennedy	Michala Banas	2008	
Malcolm Kennedy	Benjamin McNair	1994–1997, 2002, 2004–2005, 2011, 2014, 2022–2023	
Susan Kennedy	Jackie Woodburne	1994–2025	
Tom Kennedy	Bob Hornery	1996, 1999, 2006–2007	
Colton Keys	Jakob Ambrose	2025	
Katya Kinski	Dichen Lachman	2005–2007	
Nate Kinski	Meyne Wyatt	2014–2016	
Rachel Kinski	Caitlin Stasey	2005–2009	
Zeke Kinski	Matthew Werkmeister	2005–2011, 2014	
Ben Kirk	Noah Sutherland	2001–2003	
Ben Kirk	Sean Berends	2004	
Ben Kirk	Blake O'Leary	2007–2010	
Ben Kirk	Felix Mallard	2014–2019	
Drew Kirk	Dan Paris	1998–2002, 2005	
Marlene Kratz	Moya O'Sullivan	1994–1997, 2005	
Sam Kratz	Richard Grieve	1994–1996, 2005, 2025	

=== L ===
Character	Actor(s)	Duration	Ref(s)
Katie Landers	Sally Jensen	1988–1989	
Todd Landers	Kristian Schmid	1988–1992	
Rhys Lawson	Ben Barber	2011–2013	
Lori Lee	Michelle Ang	2002–2004	
Sunny Lee	Hany Lee	2009	
Gloria Lewis	Beverley Phillips	1988–1990	
Rob Lewis	Ernie Bourne	1987–1989	

=== M ===
Character	Actor(s)	Duration	Ref(s)
Joe Mangel	Mark Little	1988–1991, 2005, 2022	
Kerry Mangel	Claudine Henningsen	2006–2007	
Nell Mangel	Vivean Gray	1986–1988	
Sky Mangel	Miranda Fryer	1989–1991	
Sky Mangel	Stephanie McIntosh	2003–2007, 2015, 2020, 2022, 2024	
Toby Mangel	Finn Greentree-Keane	1988–1990	
Toby Mangel	Ben Geurens	1990–1993	
Beverly Marshall	Lisa Armytage	1987–1989	
Beverly Marshall	Shaunna O'Grady	1989–1990, 2005, 2019–2020, 2025	
Diana Marshall	Jane Badler	2010	
Debbie Martin	Mandy Storvik	1985	
Debbie Martin	Katrina McEwan	1985	
Debbie Martin	Marnie Reece-Wilmore	1992–1994, 1996–1997, 2005	
Hannah Martin	Rebecca Ritters	1992–1999, 2005	
Julie Martin	Vikki Blanche	1985	
Julie Martin	Julie Mullins	1992–1994	
Michael Martin	Samuel Hammington	1985	
Michael Martin	Troy Beckwith	1992–1998	
Philip Martin	Christopher Milne	1985	
Philip Martin	Ian Rawlings	1992–1999, 2005, 2022–2023	
Paul McClain	Jansen Spencer	1997–2001, 2005	
Ryan McLachlan	Richard Norton	1990–1991	
Tiffany McLachlan	Amber Kilpatrick	1989–1990	
Troy Miller	Dieter Brummer	2011–2012	
Jade Mitchell	Gemma Pranita	2010–2012, 2019	
Chelsea Murphy	Viva Bianca	2024–2025	

=== N ===
Character	Actor(s)	Duration	Ref(s)
Declan Napier	James Sorensen	2007–2010	
Declan Napier	Erin Mullally	2010–2011	
India Napier	Gabriella De Vercelli	2009–2011	
India Napier	Alia De Vercelli	2009–2011	
Rebecca Napier	Jane Hall	2007–2011, 2014, 2019	
Bea Nilsson	Bonnie Anderson	2018–2023	

=== O ===
Character	Actor(s)	Duration	Ref(s)
Taye Obasi	Lakota Johnson	2025	
Catherine O'Brien	Radha Mitchell	1996–1997	
Connor O'Neill	Patrick Harvey	2002–2006, 2012	

=== P ===
Character	Actor(s)	Duration	Ref(s)
Nick Page	Mark Stevens	1988–1990	
Chris Pappas	James Mason	2010–2015, 2022	
Bridget Parker	Eloise Mignon	2007–2009	
Miranda Parker	Nikki Coghill	2007–2009	
Ned Parker	Daniel O'Connor	2005–2008	
Riley Parker	Sweeney Young	2007–2008	
Steve Parker	Steve Bastoni	2007–2009	
Stuart Parker	Blair McDonough	2001–2006, 2018, 2022	
Melanie Pearson	Lucinda Cowden	1987–1991, 2005, 2021–2025	

=== R ===
Character	Actor(s)	Duration	Ref(s)
Danny Ramsay	David Clencie	1985–1986, 2005	
Gemma Ramsay	Beth Buchanan	1990–1991, 2019, 2022	
Harry Ramsay	Will Moore	2009–2010	
Henry Ramsay	Craig McLachlan	1987–1989	
Kate Ramsay	Ashleigh Brewer	2009–2014	
Maria Ramsay	Dasha Bláhová	1985	
Max Ramsay (older)	Francis Bell	1985–1986	
Max Ramsay (younger)	Ben Jackson	2024–2025	
Shane Ramsay	Peter O'Brien	1985–1987, 2022, 2024–2025	
Sophie Ramsay	Kaiya Jones	2009–2014	
Tom Ramsay	Gary Files	1986, 1990–1991, 2015	
Angie Rebecchi	Lesley Baker	1995–1996, 2002–2006, 2008, 2013, 2015, 2017–2019, 2022–2023	
Callum Rebecchi	Morgan Baker	2008–2015, 2017, 2019, 2022–2023	
Dipi Rebecchi	Sharon Johal	2017–2021	
Hugo Rebecchi	John Turner	2018–2022	
Hugo Rebecchi	Tanner Ellis-Anderson	2023–2024	
Kirsha Rebecchi	Vani Dhir	2017–2020	
Nell Rebecchi	Scarlett Anderson	2013–2022	
Nell Rebecchi	Ayisha Salem-Towner	2023–2025	
Shane Rebecchi	Greg O'Meara	1994–1995	
Shane Rebecchi	Nicholas Coghlan	2017–2021	
Sonya Rebecchi	Eve Morey	2009–2020, 2022	
Stonefish Rebecchi	Anthony Engelman	1994–1996, 2003, 2007, 2015–2018	
Toadfish Rebecchi	Ryan Moloney	1995–2025	
Yashvi Rebecchi	Olivia Junkeer	2017–2023	
Gemma Reeves	Kathryn Beck	2013–2014	
Tad Reeves	Jonathon Dutton	1998–2002, 2022	
Adam Rhodes	Benjamin Hart	2007	
Brenda Riley	Genevieve Lemon	1991–1992	
Andrew Robinson	Shannon Holmes	1991–1992	
Andrew Robinson	Jordan Patrick Smith	2009–2013, 2022	
Charlene Robinson	Kylie Minogue	1986–1988, 2022	
Daniel Robinson	Tim Phillipps	2014–2016, 2023	
Elle Robinson	Pippa Black	2005–2009, 2019, 2022	
Elle Robinson	Elise Jansen	2025	
Gail Robinson	Fiona Corke	1987–1989, 2005–2007, 2019	
Harlow Robinson	Jemma Donovan	2019–2022	
Hilary Robinson	Anne Scott-Pendlebury	1987–1990, 2005, 2015–2018, 2023–2025	
Jim Robinson	Alan Dale	1985–1993, 2018–2019	
Lucy Robinson	Kylie Flinker	1985–1987	
Lucy Robinson	Sasha Close	1987–1989	
Lucy Robinson	Melissa Bell	1991–1993, 1995, 2005, 2013–2016, 2020–2025	
Matt Robinson	Ashley Paske	1989–1991	
Paul Robinson	Stefan Dennis	1985–1993, 2004–2025	
Scott Robinson	Darius Perkins	1985	
Scott Robinson	Jason Donovan	1986–1989, 2022	
Andrew Rodwell	David Lamb	2018–2019	
Andrew Rodwell	Lloyd Will	2020–2025	
Felix Rodwell	James Beaufort	2024–2025	
Sadie Rodwell	Emerald Chan	2022–2025	
Wendy Rodwell	Candice Leask	2021–2025	

=== S ===
Character	Actor(s)	Duration	Ref(s)
Joel Samuels	Daniel MacPherson	1998–2002, 2022	
Felicity Scully	Holly Valance	1999–2002, 2005, 2022	
Jack Scully	Paul Pantano	2001	
Jack Scully	Jay Bunyan	2002–2005	
Joe Scully	Shane Connor	1999–2004	
Lyn Scully	Janet Andrewartha	1999–2006, 2008–2011, 2016–2017, 2019	
Michelle Scully	Kate Keltie	1999–2004, 2023	
Oscar Scully	Ingo Dammer-Smith	2003–2006	
Stephanie Scully	Carla Bonner	1999–2010, 2013, 2015–2018, 2022	
Zara Selwyn	Freya Van Dyke	2022	
Mishti Sharma	Scarlet Vas	2017–2018	
Valda Sheergold	Joan Sydney	2002–2005, 2007–2008	
Marco Silvani	Jesse Rosenfeld	2007–2008	
Krista Sinclair	Majella Davis	2023–2025	
Reece Sinclair	Mischa Barton	2023	
Paige Smith	Olympia Valance	2014–2018, 2020, 2022	
Andrea Somers	Madeleine West	2017–2020	
Brett Stark	Brett Blewitt	1993–1996, 2005, 2023	
Cheryl Stark	Caroline Gillmer	1993–1996	
Cheryl Stark	Colette Mann	1995–1996	
Danni Stark	Eliza Szonert	1993–1996, 2005	
Darren Stark	Scott Major	1993	
Darren Stark	Todd MacDonald	1996–1998, 2004–2005, 2007–2008	
Pepper Steiger	Nicky Whelan	2006–2007	
Byron Stone	Joe Klocek	2022	
Byron Stone	Xavier Molyneux	2023–2025	
Nicolette Stone	Charlotte Chimes	2020–2022	
Nicolette Stone	Hannah Monson	2023–2025	

=== T ===
Character	Actor(s)	Duration	Ref(s)
David Tanaka	Takaya Honda	2016–2024	
Leo Tanaka	Tim Kano	2016–2025	
Bree Timmins	Sianoa Smit-McPhee	2005–2007	
Dylan Timmins	Damien Bodie	2005–2007, 2020	
Janae Timmins	Eliza Taylor-Cotter	2005–2008	
Janelle Timmins	Nell Feeney	2004–2007, 2015	
Stingray Timmins	Ben Nicholas	2004–2007	
Nina Tucker	Delta Goodrem	2002–2005, 2015, 2022	
Amber Turner	Jenna Rosenow	2013–2016	
Bailey Turner	Calen Mackenzie	2013–2015	
Lauren Turner	Sarah Vandenbergh	1993–1994	
Lauren Turner	Kate Kendall	2013–2018, 2022	
Mason Turner	Taylor Glockner	2013–2014	
Matt Turner	Josef Brown	2013–2016	
Darcy Tyler	Mark Raffety	2000–2005, 2025	

=== U ===
Character	Actor(s)	Duration	Ref(s)
Sally Upton	Sally Davis	1998–1999	

=== V ===
Character	Actor(s)	Duration	Ref(s)
Cara Varga-Murphy	Sara West	2023–2025	
Dex Varga-Murphy	Marley Williams	2023–2025	
JJ Varga-Murphy	Riley Bryant	2023–2025	
Remi Varga-Murphy	Naomi Rukavina	2023–2025	
Vanessa Villante	Alin Sumarwata	2012–2013, 2015, 2019	

=== W ===
Character	Actor(s)	Duration	Ref(s)
Sindi Watts	Marisa Warrington	2002–2005, 2017–2018	
Sally Wells	Rowena Mohr	1987–1988	
Nicola West	Imogen Bailey	2008	
Anne Wilkinson	Brooke Satchwell	1996–2000	
Lance Wilkinson	Andrew Bibby	1995–2001, 2005, 2018, 2022–2023	
Ruth Wilkinson	Ailsa Piper	1996–1999, 2005	
Amy Williams	Nicolette Minster	1988	
Amy Williams	Sheridan Compagnino	1992	
Amy Williams	Zoe Cramond	2015–2020, 2022	
Jimmy Williams	Darcy Tadich	2015–2020, 2025	
Michael Williams	Sandy Winton	2010–2012	
Natasha Williams	Valentina Novakovic	2010–2013	
Adam Willis	Ian Williams	1990–1991	
Brad Willis	Benjamin Grant Mitchell	1989	
Brad Willis	Scott Michaelson	1991–1993	
Brad Willis	Kip Gamblin	2013–2017	
Cody Willis	Amelia Frid	1989–1991	
Cody Willis	Peta Brady	1993–1996	
Doug Willis	Terence Donovan	1990–1994, 2005, 2014–2016, 2022	
Gaby Willis	Rachel Blakely	1991–1994, 2005	
Imogen Willis	Ariel Kaplan	2013–2016, 2019, 2023	
Josh Willis	Harley Bonner	2013–2016	
Ned Willis	Ben Hall	2016–2022, 2025	
Pam Willis	Sue Jones	1990–1994, 1996, 2014, 2016	
Piper Willis	Mavournee Hazel	2015–2019	
Roxy Willis	Zima Anderson	2019–2022, 2025	
Terese Willis	Rebekah Elmaloglou	2013–2025	
Zac Willis	Jay Callahan	1994	
Zac Willis	Alex Kaan	2025	
Freya Wozniak	Phoebe Roberts	2022	

=== Y ===
Character	Actor(s)	Duration	Ref(s)
Frazer Yeats	Ben Lawson	2006–2008	
Mike Young	Guy Pearce	1986–1989, 2022–2024	

== Characters by year of introduction ==
1980s

- 1985
- 1986
- 1987
- 1988

1990s

- 1990
- 1991
- 1992
- 1993
- 1994
- 1997
- 1998
- 1999

2000s

- 2000
- 2001
- 2002
- 2003
- 2004
- 2005
- 2006
- 2007
- 2008
- 2009

2010s

- 2010
- 2011
- 2012
- 2013
- 2014
- 2015
- 2016
- 2017
- 2018
- 2019

2020s

- 2020
- 2021
- 2022
- 2023
- 2024
- 2025
