= Ramsay Street =

Fictional cul-de-sac in the Australian soap opera Neighbours

- Neighbours location
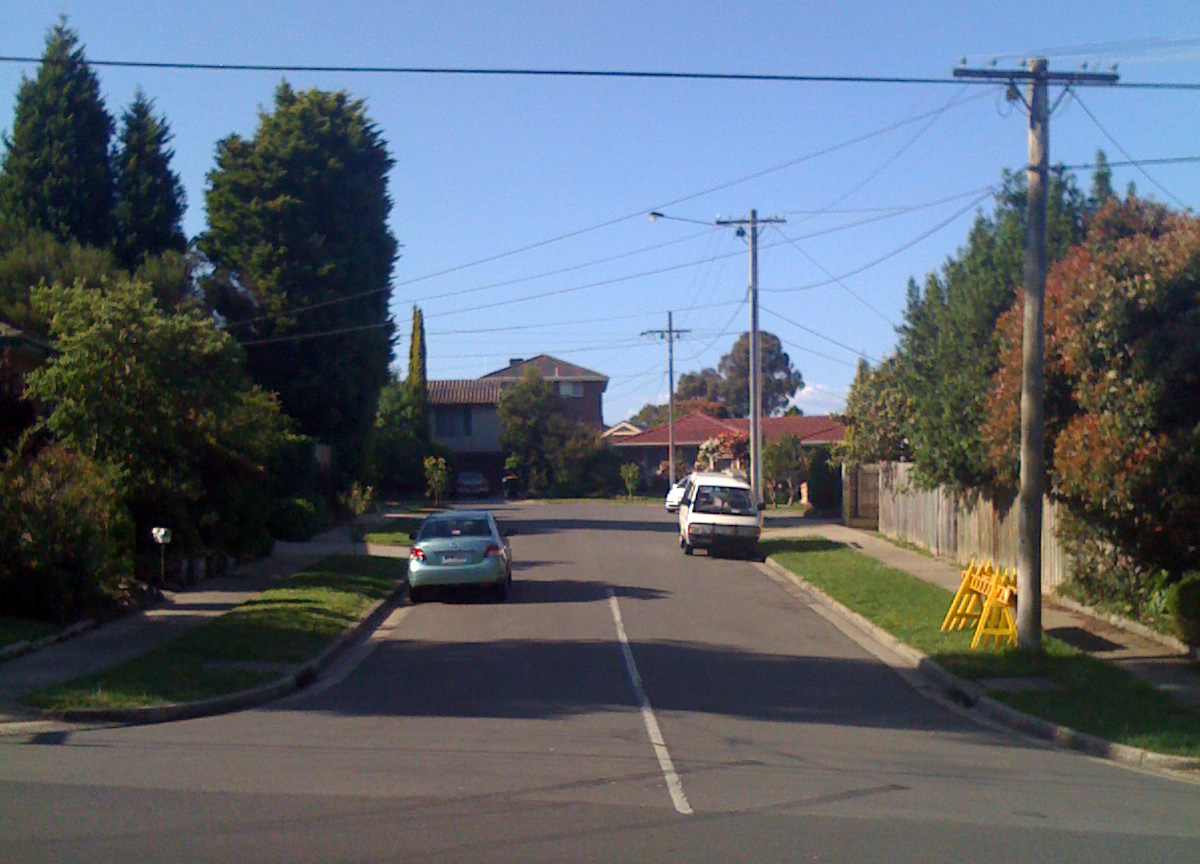
- View of Pin Oak Court, Vermont South, which substitutes for Ramsay Street
- Created by: Reg Watson
- Genre: Soap opera

In-universe information
- Type: Cul-de-sac
- Characters: Neighbours characters

Ramsay Street is the fictional cul-de-sac in which the characters of the Australian television soap opera Neighbours live. The street is set in the equally fictional Melbourne suburb of Erinsborough. Neighbours storylines primarily centre on the residents of the street, which was named after Jack Ramsay, the grandfather of original character Max Ramsay (Francis Bell). A blackjack game between Jack and Sam Robinson determined whom the street would be named after.

Only six houses on the street are featured on a regular basis; numbers 22 to 32. Number 34 was featured for the only time in 2018. The cul-de-sac is at the end of a long street and the rest of the houses are on the other side of the main road which bisects it. The street behind Ramsay Street is named Mirrabooka Drive. A storyline within the show saw the name of the street nearly changed to Ramsbottom Street. Harold Bishop (Ian Smith) led a protest against it and won.

Pin Oak Court, in Vermont South is the real cul-de-sac that has doubled for Ramsay Street for the entirety of Neighbours' run. All of the houses featured in the show are real and the residents allowed Neighbours to shoot external scenes in their front and back gardens. Backyard scenes were moved to bespoke sets from 2013.

Pin Oak Court has become popular with tourists, with tours to the cul-de-sac running throughout the year. The interior scenes have been filmed at Network Ten's Global Television studios in Nunawading, except for the 1985 series, which was filmed at the studios of Flinders Productions from the Seven Network, the adjoining suburb in which Pin Oak Court is located.

As part of the serial's finale in July 2022, all the characters living on the street, with the exceptions of Susan (Jackie Woodburne) and Karl Kennedy (Alan Fletcher), put their houses up for sale, however most of them end up staying. The 2022 Neighbours finale ends with the neighbours having a street party on Ramsay Street. On 18 September 2023 the show returned, with Pin Oak Court continuing to feature as a regular location. When Neighbours concluded again on 11 December 2025, its final storyline revolved around a threat to demolish Ramsay Street to make way for a freeway. The series' ambiguous ending was designed to allow any future revivals to feature Ramsay Street or not, depending on production restrictions.

== History ==
Neighbours creator Reg Watson was sure that the neighbourhood setting was a good idea for a serial drama, following his work on daytime soap opera Until Tomorrow, which was set in a suburban street. He stated, "I wanted to show three families living in a small street in a Melbourne suburb who are friends." Location scouts found the quiet Pin Oak Court in Vermont South, on the "Sunrise Hill" estate just off Springvale Road.

All of the residents signed up when they were told that the show would likely last a couple of years, and they would receive payment in return for allowing filming to take place outside their houses. As of 2019, FremantleMedia continues to pay homeowners a fee each year for allowing them to film the properties. A full-time security guard is also employed. Pin Oak Court became popular with viewers and regular tours ran to the cul-de-sac.

Interior sets were built at the Seven Network's HSV studios in Melbourne. When Seven cancelled Neighbours in July 1985, it was immediately picked up by Network Ten. When the sets were due to be collected, Seven said they had been destroyed in a fire, forcing Ten to build new sets. The interior scenes are now filmed at Global Television studios in Forest Hill. In the 1980s, the interior decor of the houses was meant to be "unobtrusive and easy to watch." The majority of the furniture and wallpaper came from normal stores, but the curtains had to be specially made to hide the fact the scenes outside the windows were painted.

== No. 22 ==
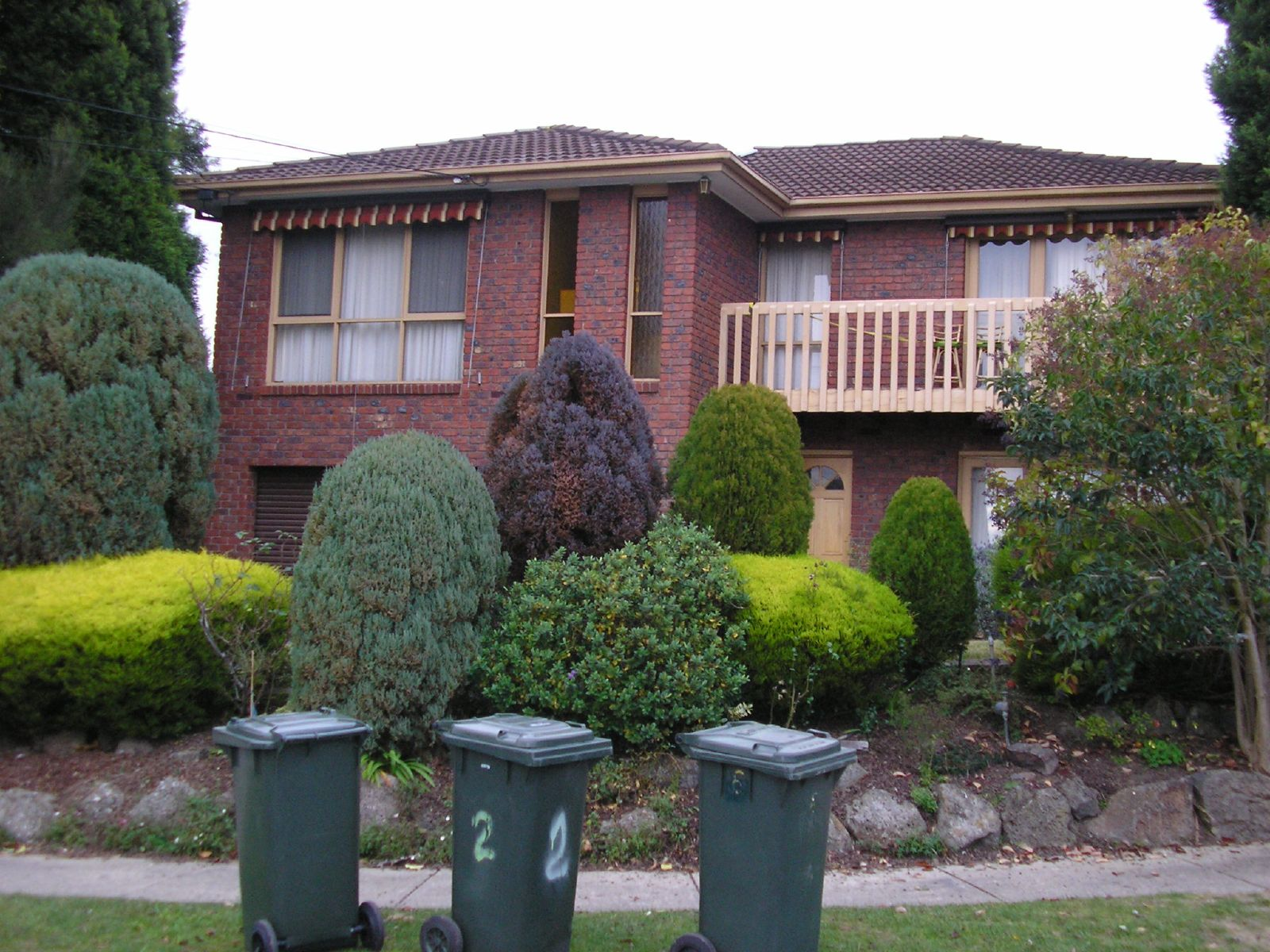
No. 22

When Neighbours first began, Number 22 was empty. In 1986, the house is rented out by Clive Gibbons (Geoff Paine), who rented it from an unseen landlord. During his time there, Clive invites Daphne Lawrence (Elaine Smith), Zoe Davis (Ally Fowler) and Mike Young (Guy Pearce) to move in with him. Clive later begins a relationship with Susan Cole (Gloria Ajenstat) and he invites her to move in. Susan leaves Ramsay Street and Clive moves into a flat behind his surgery. Following Clive's departure, the house is bought by Paul Robinson (Stefan Dennis) for the Daniels Corporation, who want the land to build a supermarket on. The deal falls through and Paul moves in. When he marries Gail Lewis (Fiona Corke), the couple live there as husband and wife until their divorce in 1989. Paul then rents the house to twins Caroline (Gillian Blakeney) and Christina Alessi (Gayle Blakeney). Paul later marries Christina and they live in the house with their son, Andrew (Shannon Holmes). In 1992, Caroline, Christina, Paul and Andrew leave. The house is then rented out to Benito (George Spartels) and Cathy Alessi (Elspeth Ballantyne), who move in with their sons, Marco (Felice Arena) and Rick (Dan Falzon). Marco left in late 1992. Benito and Cathy leave in 1993, causing Rick to move out.

Number 22 is left empty for a while, but Paul then rents it to the Lim Family for a month. Paul then sells the house to Cheryl Stark (Caroline Gillmer) and she moves in with her son and daughter, Brett (Brett Blewitt) and Danni (Eliza Szonert). Cheryl, Brett and Danni go to live with Cheryl's partner, Lou Carpenter (Tom Oliver) for a short while, before all four move back to Number 22. Cheryl dies in 1996 and Brett and Danni move away. Cheryl's elder son, Darren (Todd MacDonald), and Marlene Kratz (Moya O'Sullivan) move in to help Lou. Marlene leaves in 1997 and Darren in 1998. Lou's youngest daughter, Louise (Jiordan Anna Tolli), also leaves when it is revealed that Lou was not her biological father. Lou then begins to take in lodgers, including Toadfish Rebecchi (Ryan Moloney), Drew Kirk (Dan Paris) and Darcy Tyler (Mark Raffety).

Drew and his wife Libby (Kym Valentine) rent the house from Lou briefly, following the birth of their son Ben (Noah Sutherland). After Drew's death, Libby moves back in with her parents and Lou returns. Nina Tucker (Delta Goodrem) and her mother, Trixie Tucker (Wendy Stapleton), move in with Lou and both later move in 2003. Valda Sheergold (Joan Sydney) buys the house when Lou begins going through financial troubles. Valda later sells the house back to Paul. Paul kicks Lou out and moves his girlfriend, Isabelle Hoyland (Natalie Bassingthwaighte) in. Paul's daughter, Elle (Pippa Black), also moves in and not long after, her brothers, Robert (Adam Hunter) and Cameron (also Hunter), move in until Robert is sent to prison and Cameron dies. Isabelle leaves the street in 2006 and Paul invites Lyn Scully (Janet Andrewartha) to move in, after Lyn is forced to sell her own house. Lyn leaves Erinsborough for Shelley Bay following her and Paul's brief marriage. Elle discovers that Paul has deceived her and was involved in her break-up with Dylan Timmins (Damien Bodie), so she devised a plan to trick Paul into signing all his assets over to her. Elle takes in Ned Parker (Daniel O'Connor) as a lodger and shortly afterwards she lets Paul move back in. Ned later moves into Number 26.

Paul asks Rebecca Napier (Jane Hall) and her son, Declan (James Sorensen), to move in. When Paul's affair with Kirsten Gannon (Nikola Dubois) is exposed, Rebecca and Declan move out. Elle forces Paul to leave for a short while and she later invites Donna Freedman (Margot Robbie) to move in. Elle invites her boyfriend, Lucas Fitzgerald (Scott Major), to move with her. Rebecca, Declan and his daughter, India (Alia De Vercelli/Gabriella De Vercelli), are forced to move out of Number 26 and they move back into Number 22. Elle sells the house back to Paul to ease her financial troubles. Elle departs for a job and Paul's youngest son, Andrew, returns to Erinsborough and moves in. Donna moves out to live with her husband. Rebecca, Declan and India move out after Rebecca leaves Paul. Sophie Ramsay (Kaiya Jones) and her sister, Kate (Ashleigh Brewer), move in during 2011 and 2012 respectively. The following year, Andrew and Sophie leave Erinsborough, while Kate and Paul move out.

The Number 22 set was given a makeover in time for the arrival of the Willis family, who move in shortly after their arrival on-screen in May 2013. After two years in Canada, Piper Willis (Mavournee Hazel) moves in, just as her parents' relationship falls apart. In 2015, Brad Willis (Kip Gamblin) moves out to live at Number 32. He later returns temporarily to care for an injured Terese. In 2016, Paul briefly returns to live at Number 22 after moving out of his penthouse apartment in Lassiter's. Josh Willis (Harley Bonner) is killed in an explosion at the hotel. Helping her to grieve, Piper takes in Clementine the cat as her own and Clementine lives at Number 22 till 2020. Imogen Willis (Ariel Kaplan) leaves following her marriage to Daniel Robinson (Tim Phillipps). Terese and Piper are joined by Brad's daughter, Paige Smith (Olympia Valance), and her son, Gabriel (Kian Bafekrpour), between 2017 and 2018, followed by Brad's son, Ned Willis (Ben Hall). In 2019, Piper moves away and Paul returns to Number 22 prior to his marriage to Terese. The household is complemented by the additions of Roxy Willis (Zima Anderson) and Paul's granddaughter, Harlow Robinson (Jemma Donovan). Terese invites Britney Barnes (Montana Cox) and her daughter, Abigail Tanaka (Mary Finn), to briefly stay, before she kicks Paul out following his continuous deceit towards her and later Harlow when she expresses her support for Paul. To Paul's disappointment, Terese invites his half-brother, Glen Donnelly (Richard Huggett), to live with her to help her stay sober. Roxy then moves out following her marriage and Ned later moves to Sydney. Terese's estranged mother, Estelle Petrides (Maria Mercedes), temporarily moves into the home. As part of the serial's final episodes, Terese prepares to leave Erinsborough. However after Terese and Glen break up and her marriage to Paul is rekindled, she shuts down the sale of her house. When Toadie marries Terese, he and his children, Nell Rebecchi (Ayisha Salem-Towner) and Hugo Somers (Tanner Ellis-Anderson) move into Number 22. Toadie later moves out after he and Terese separate. In 2025, Terese and Nell move in with Paul in Lassiter's Hotel, and number 22 is rented to Darcy upon his return to Erinsborough.

The "fourth wall" of Number 22 was first shown in 2022 as a part of set revamps Neighbours undertook for the new year.

== No. 24 ==
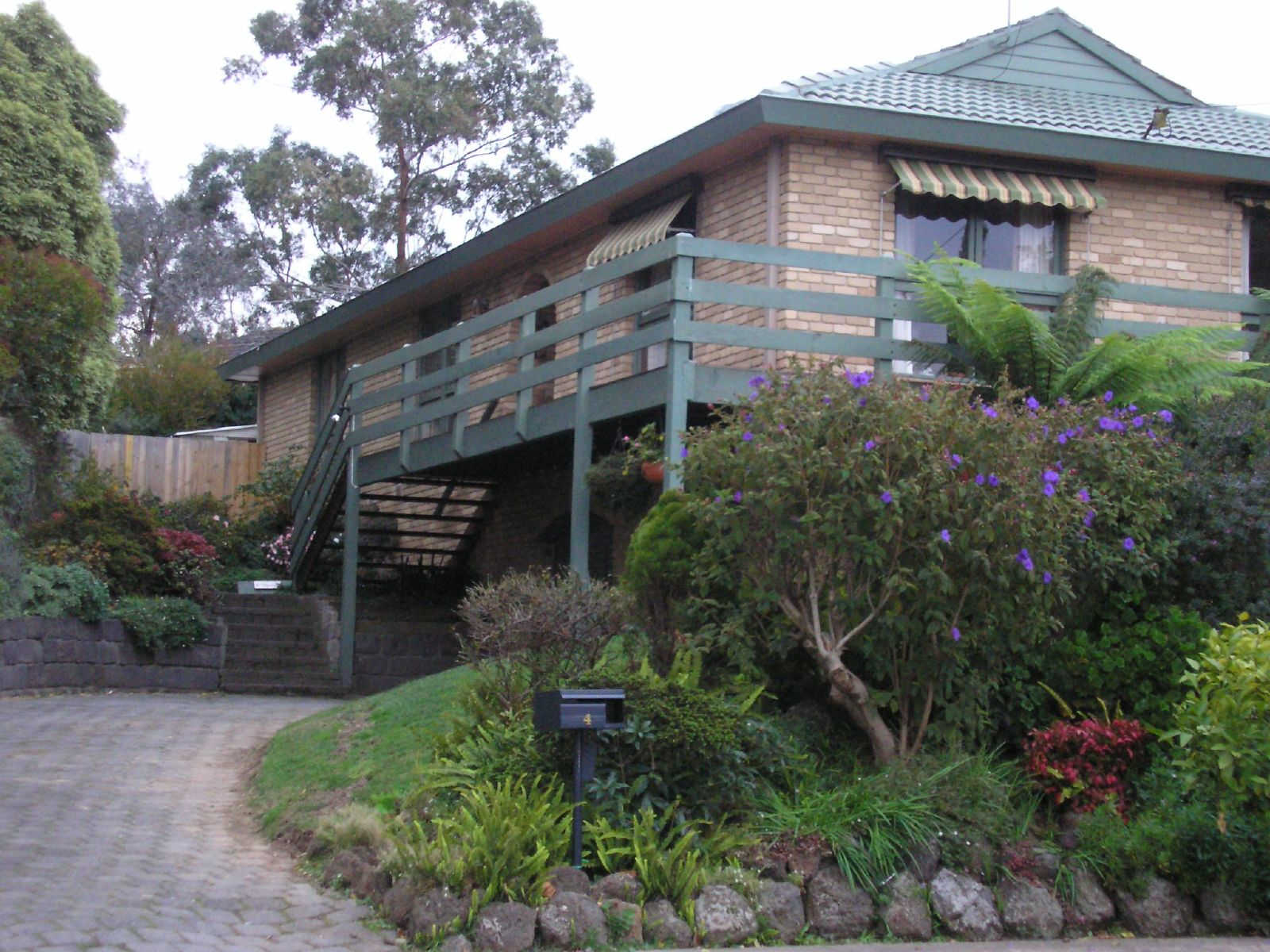
No. 24

Number 24 was one of the three original houses featured in Ramsay Street and was associated with the Ramsay family when the show began. Max Ramsay (Francis Bell), his wife Maria Ramsay (Dasha Blahova) and their two sons Shane Ramsay (Peter O'Brien) and Danny Ramsay (David Clencie) are the first family to live there. After their departures, Max's sister, Madge Mitchell (Anne Charleston), her children Charlene Mitchell (Kylie Minogue) and Henry Ramsay (Craig McLachlan), and Max and Madge's brother, Tom Ramsay (Gary Files), all live there. Charlene and Madge's husbands, Scott Robinson (Jason Donovan) and Harold Bishop (Ian Smith), move in after their respective weddings. Madge and Harold take in Brenda Riley (Genevieve Lemon) and her nephew, Guy Carpenter (Andrew Williams), and later Lou Carpenter (Tom Oliver).

After Madge's departure from the serial in 1992, Lou takes in a number of lodgers, including Beth Brennan (Natalie Imbruglia) and Cameron Hudson (Benjamin Grant Mitchell), and Annalise Hartman (Kimberley Davies). Marlene Kratz (Moya O'Sullivan) buys the house and moves in with her grandson, Sam Kratz (Richard Grieve). They take in Cody Willis (Peta Brady) as a lodger when her parents move away. Annalise and her sister, Joanna Hartman (Emma Harrison), also move in. Cheryl Stark (Caroline Gillmer) and her daughter, Louise Carpenter (Jiordan Tolli), move in and are later joined by Cheryl's son, Darren Stark (Todd MacDonald), who stay until Cheryl's death. Harold returns and reunites with Madge, leading them to buy the house. They foster teenagers Paul McClain (Jansen Spencer) and Tad Reeves (Jonathon Dutton) until Madge's death in 2001.

Harold is joined by his granddaughters, Sky Mangel (Stephanie McIntosh) and Serena Bishop (Lara Sacher), his son David Bishop (Kevin Harrington), and daughter-in-law, Liljana Bishop (Marcella Russo). After David and his family die in a plane crash, Marco Silvani (Jesse Rosenfeld) and Carmella Cammeniti (Natalie Blair) rent the property. Afterwards, Harold gives the house to the Salvation Army. Donna Freedman's (Margot Robbie) mother, Cassandra Freedman (Tottie Goldsmith), and half-siblings, Simon Freedman (Mauricio Merino Jr) and Tegan Freedman (Chelsea Jones), are the first family to move in at the start of 2009. A locket belonging to Anne Robinson is found underneath the house, as part of a storyline reintroducing the Ramsay family. The locket leads to the revelation that Anne and Max Ramsay had a daughter, Jill Ramsay (Perri Cummings), whose children Kate Ramsay (Ashleigh Brewer), Harry Ramsay (Will Moore) and Sophie Ramsay (Kaiya Jones) move into Number 24. They take in Lou, Lucas Fitzgerald (Scott Major), and Vanessa Villante (Alin Sumarwata).

In 2012, the Kapoor family – Ajay (Sachin Joab), his wife Priya (Menik Gooneratne), and their daughter, Rani (Coco Cherian) – are introduced to the regular cast and move into the house. The set underwent a makeover, and Gooneratne helped decorate the living area with some of her personal family photos. She stated, "Although I'm officially at work, having photos of my parents and grandparents taken when they lived in Sri Lanka makes it feel more like home." Mark Brennan (Scott McGregor) rents the house, and eventually buys it. Paige Smith (Olympia Valance) takes over the spare room following her introduction. Mark is later joined by his siblings, Tyler (Travis Burns), Aaron (Matt Wilson) and Chloe Brennan (April Rose Pengilly). Aaron's husband, David Tanaka (Takaya Honda), moves in with the family, before they both purchase Number 32. Elly Conway (Jodi Anasta) briefly moves in when she becomes engaged and later married to Mark. Following Mark's departure, he rents the house to Chloe and her partner, Pierce Greyson (Tim Robards), who moves in with his son, Hendrix Greyson (Benny Turland). After Chloe and Pierce break up, Hendrix moves out and Nicolette Stone (Charlotte Chimes) and Jane Harris (Annie Jones) move in, until Nicolette runs away. Mackenzie Hargreaves (Georgie Stone) and Freya Wozniak (Phoebe Roberts) later move in, before Chloe soon invites Kiri Durant (Gemma Bird Matheson) to move in. As part of the serial's finale, Chloe put the house up for sale. Shane Ramsay buys the house again on behalf of Maria, though when his business plans fall through, Mike Young (Guy Pearce) takes over the sale and later, off-screen, moves in with Jane and his daughter, Sam Young (Henrietta Graham).

== No. 26 ==
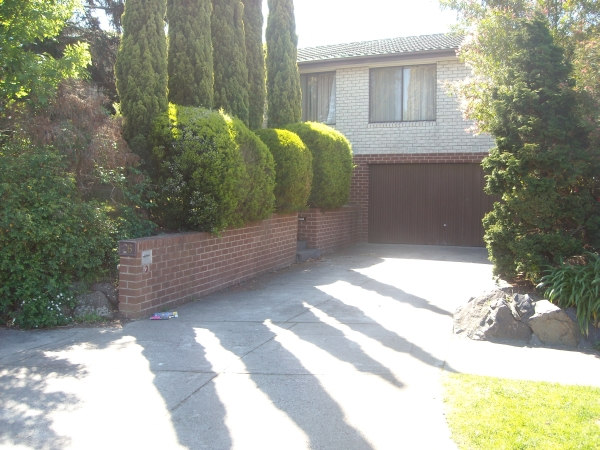
No. 26 was closely associated with the Robinson family from the serial's beginning in 1985.

Number 26 was occupied by Jim Robinson (Alan Dale), his mother-in-law Helen Daniels (Anne Haddy) and his four children, Paul (Stefan Dennis), Julie (Vikki Blanche), Scott (Darius Perkins) and Lucy Robinson (Kylie Flinker) when Neighbours began in 1985. As the children move out, various relations stay at the house, including Jim's long-lost son, Glen Donnelly (Richard Huggett), and Jim's wife Beverly Marshall's (Lisa Armytage) niece and nephew, Katie Landers (Sally Jensen) and Todd Landers (Kristian Schmid). Lodgers also include Nick Page (Mark Stevens) and Matt Robinson (Ashley Paske). Following Alan Dale's decision to leave the show in 1993, producers decided to kill Jim off and he had a fatal heart attack in the kitchen. Dale felt "stitched up" by the producers, who left him lying on the floor of the set all day. After Jim's departure, the house is home to Wayne Duncan (Jonathan Sammy Lee) and Julie's family, which includes her husband, Philip Martin (Ian Rawlings), his children Debbie (Marnie Reece-Wilmore) and Michael (Troy Beckwith), and their only child, Hannah (Rebecca Ritters). In 1997, Anne Haddy, the last remaining character from the original cast, was forced to quit Neighbours due to ill health. Her character, Helen, dies in the Number 26 living room. Philip's new partner, Ruth Wilkinson (Ailsa Piper), and her children, Lance Wilkinson (Andrew Bibby) and Anne Wilkinson (Brooke Satchwell), move in. In 1999, the Martin family were written out of Neighbours and Philip, Ruth and Hannah depart together.

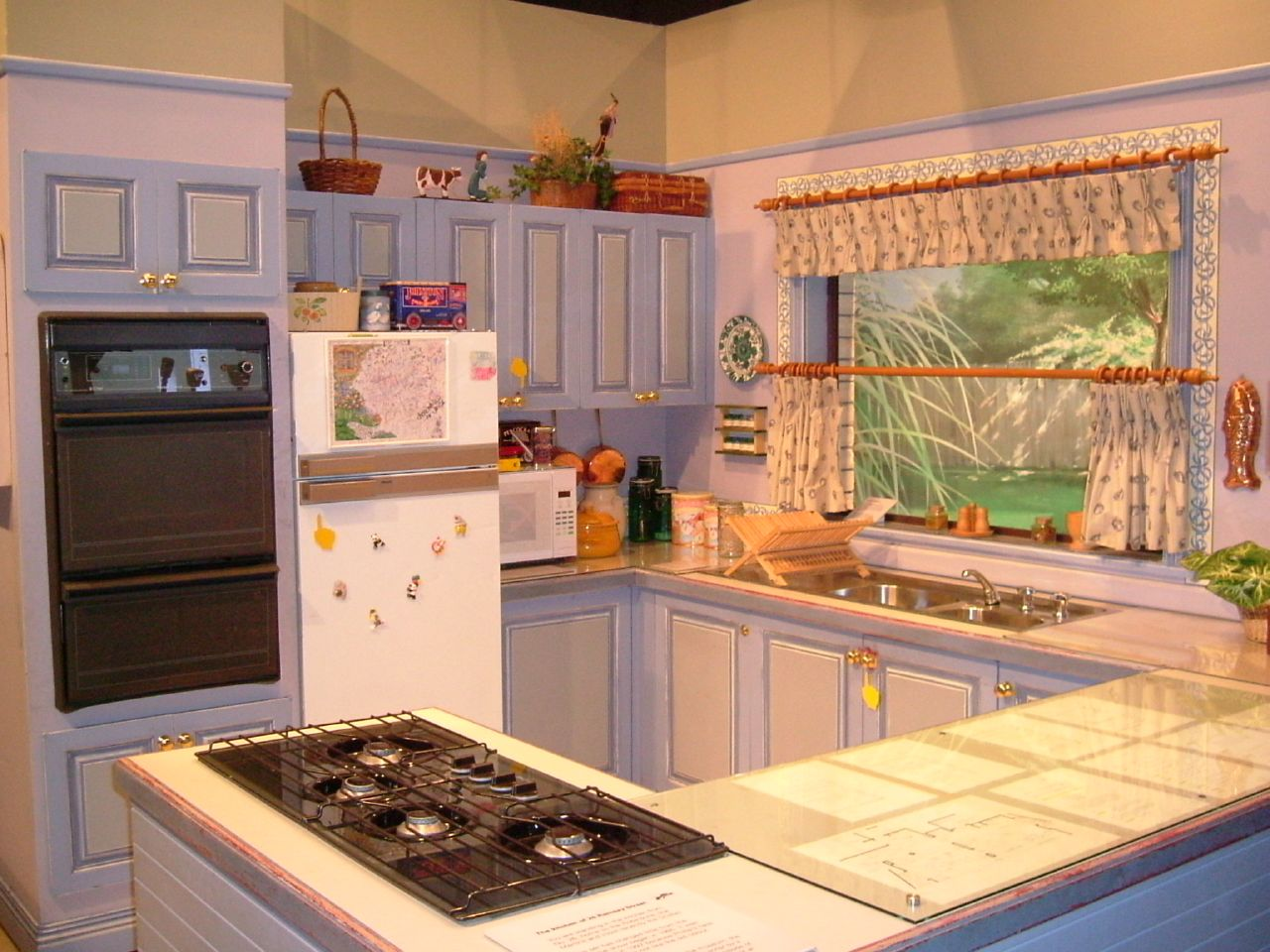
The No. 26 kitchen set was featured in the Melbourne Museum.

The Martins are replaced by the five-strong Scully family, consisting of Joe Scully (Shane Connor), his wife, Lyn (Janet Andrewartha), and their three daughters, Stephanie (Carla Bonner), Felicity (Holly Valance) and Michelle Scully (Kate Keltie). The family host various friends and family members throughout their tenure, including Connor O'Neill (Patrick Harvey), their son, Jack Scully (Jay Bunyan), and his girlfriend, Lori Lee (Michelle Ang). The family expands with the birth of Oscar Scully (Ingo Dammer-Smith). Following several departures, the Timmins family move in with Lyn. The family is made up of Janelle Timmins (Nell Feeney) and her children, Stingray (Ben Nicholas), Dylan (Damien Bodie), Janae (Eliza Taylor-Cotter) and Bree Timmins (Sianoa Smit-McPhee). Janae is the only remaining Timmins by 2007, and she lives with Ned Parker (Dan O'Connor) and his son, Mickey Gannon (Fletcher O'Leary). Producers later introduced Ned's brother Steve Parker (Steve Bastoni), his wife Miranda Parker (Nikki Coghill), and their children, Bridget Parker (Eloise Mignon) and Riley Parker (Sweeney Young). Lou Carpenter also moves in with the family, along with Miranda's sister, Nicola West (Imogen Bailey), Rebecca Napier (Jane Hall) and her son, Declan Napier (James Sorensen). The Parker's leave following Bridget's death. Steph moves back in with Lyn and they are joined by Steph's stepdaughter, Summer Hoyland (now played by Jordy Lucas).

The Number 26 set was at the centre of the serial's 2010 season finale when a fire breaks out and ruins the house. Number 26 then became a sharehouse, with residents Kyle Canning (Chris Milligan), Jade Mitchell (Gemma Pranita), Mark Brennan (Scott McGregor), Michelle Tran (HaiHa Le), and Rhys Lawson (Ben Barber). Kyle's dog, Bossy (Bossy), became an addition to the household for the next four years. Producers later introduced Kyle's grandmother Sheila Canning (Colette Mann), who decides to move to Erinsborough, and purchases the house in late 2015. Kyle's friends Chris Pappas (James Mason) and Kate Ramsay (Ashleigh Brewer) move in, followed by Sheila's daughter, Naomi Canning (Morgana O'Reilly). Kyle's wife, Georgia Brooks (Saskia Hampele), later joins the household. After Naomi's departure, Sheila invites Amy Williams (Zoe Cramond) and her son, Jimmy (Darcy Tadich), to move in. In early 2016, Sheila's granddaughter, Xanthe Canning (Lily Van der Meer) moves in. Kyle leaves the street to reunite with Georgia, before the amnesiac Jack Callahan (Andrew Morley) moves into the spare room for a short while. Following his release from prison, Gary Canning (Damien Richardson) moves in until his death in 2020, after which Kyle moves back in. Sheila adopts Gary the pigeon, believing it was a reincarnation of her son, as well as Prue the pigeon the following year. Kyle's cousin, Constable Levi Canning (Richie Morris), moves in after he transfers to Erinsborough. Roxy Willis (Zima Anderson) moves in after she and Kyle marry. Three months later, Kyle and Roxy depart Erinsborough. Sheila leaves for Los Angeles to be with Naomi and decides to sell the house, before Levi moves into Number 28. Number 26 is then bought by Andrew Rodwell (Lloyd Will), Wendy Rodwell (Candice Leask) and Sadie Rodwell (Emerald Chan), however they decide to move on a few months later. During the serial's final episode, the Rodwells decide to stay put after all.

== No. 28 ==
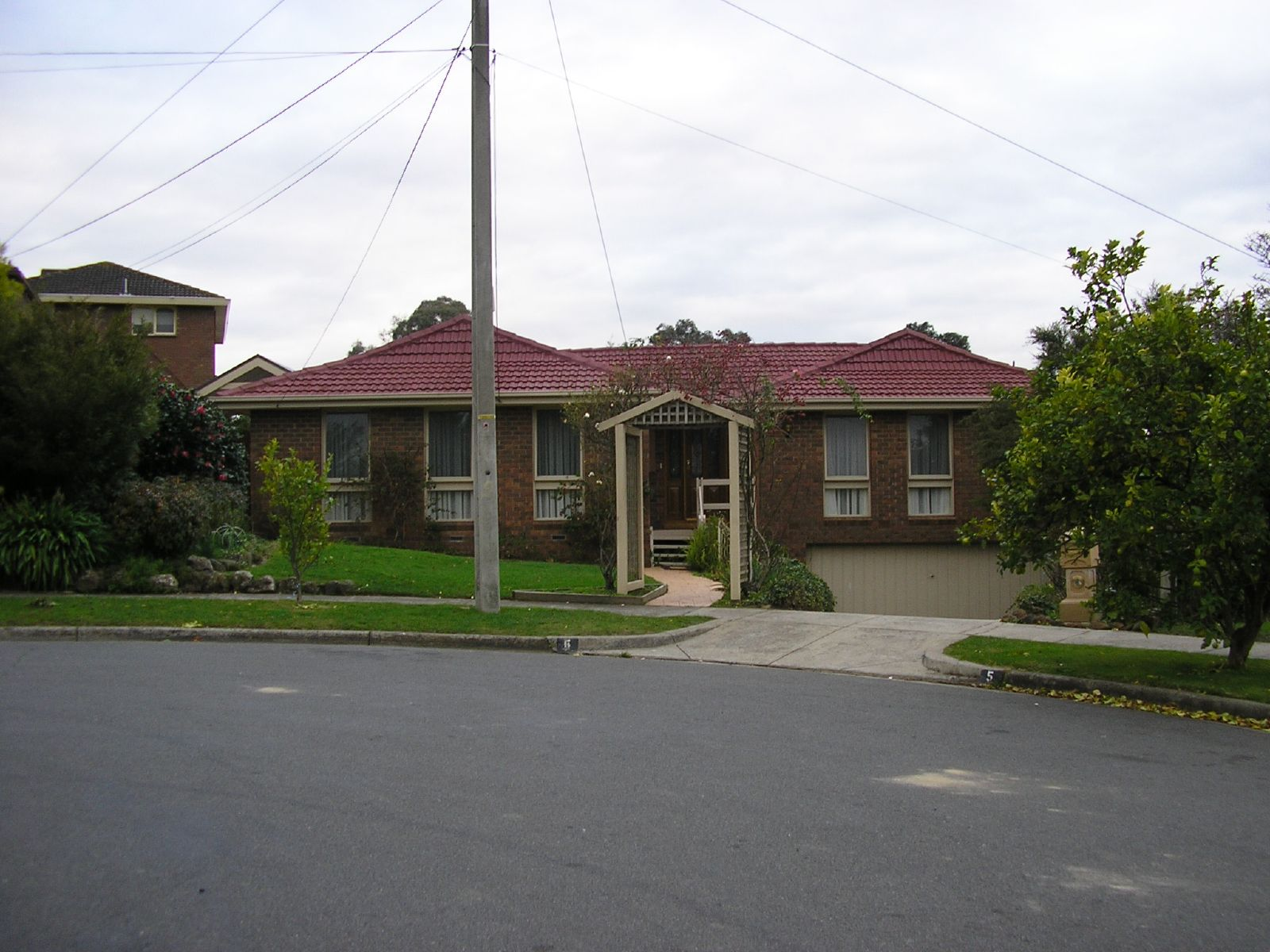
Number 28 has been associated with the Kennedy family since their introduction in 1994.

Number 28 is first owned by Des Clarke (Paul Keane), who bought the house for him and his fiancée, Lorraine Kingham (Antoinette Byron), to live in. Following Des and Lorraine's failed wedding, Des lives with Daphne Lawrence (Elaine Smith), who he eventually marries. Mike Young (Guy Pearce) moves in when Daphne and Des become his legal guardians, and their son, Jamie Clarke (S.J. Dey) is born soon after. Des and Mike continue to live in the house after Daphne dies, but Des eventually sells it to Doug Willis (Terence Donovan) and his wife, Pam Willis (Sue Jones). Their children all live in the house during their respective tenures on the show. The family departs in 1994.

The house is bought by Karl Kennedy (Alan Fletcher) and his wife, Susan Kennedy (Jackie Woodburne), who initially live with their three children, Malcolm (Benjamin McNair), Libby (Kym Valentine) and Billy Kennedy (Jesse Spencer). Karl and Susan take in various friends of their children over the years, including Toadfish Rebecchi (Ryan Moloney) and Joel Samuels (Daniel MacPherson), as well as family members Darcy Tyler (Mark Raffety) and Elly Conway (Kendell Nunn). Other lodgers have included Lori Lee (Michelle Ang), Taj Coppin (Jaime Robbie Reyne), Sindi Watts (Marisa Warrington) and Stingray Timmins (Ben Nicholas). Karl and Susan's dog, Audrey (Audrey), moves into Number 28 and lives there until her death 10 years later.

Susan marries her second husband, Alex Kinski (Andrew Clarke), in the house, shortly before he dies. His children, Rachel (Caitlin Stasey), Zeke (Matthew Werkmeister) and Katya Kinski (Dichen Lachman) all move into the house. Karl and Susan remarry, and they continue to take in teenagers who need help. Sunny Lee (Hany Lee), a foreign exchange student, stays with the family in 2009. Susan moves out when she and Karl go through a separation, but they later reconcile. Later years see Alex's nephew, Nate Kinski (Meyne Wyatt), move in, as well as the return of their grandson, Ben Kirk (Felix Mallard) and Susan's niece, Elly (now played by Jodi Anasta). Elly's sister Bea Nilsson (Bonnie Anderson) joins the family in 2018, before reformed criminal Finn Kelly (Rob Mills) is housed with the family the following year. Later in 2019, the Kennedys take in Hendrix Greyson (Benny Turland) temporarily, as Aster Conway (Isla Goulas/Scout Bowman) is born and moves in. After Elly and Aster move out, Hendrix moves in permanently after his father's departure. Levi Canning (Richie Morris) moves into the home in 2022.

In November 2019, the real house used for Number 28's exterior shots, 5 Pin Oak Court, was put up for sale for just over $1 million. It sold at auction for $1.405 million, becoming the first house on the court to sell for seven figures.

== No. 30 ==
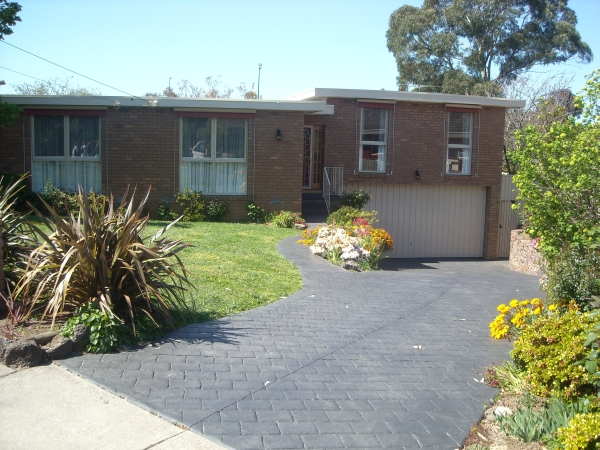
No. 30

Number 30 is occupied by Carol Brown and her family at the beginning of the series, followed briefly by the Sutton family. Later in 1985, Jim Robinson (Alan Dale) rents the house for his son, Paul (Stefan Dennis), and his new wife, Terry (Maxine Klibingaitis). Terry shoots Paul and is sent to prison. Paul then moves back to his family home. The Simpson family buy the house, but they are never seen on screen. The house next appears in 1988, when Edith Chubb (Irene Inescort) buys it and moves in with her nieces, Bronwyn (Rachel Friend) and Sharon (Jessica Muschamp). When Edith moves to the country to nurse a sick relative, Hilary Robinson (Anne Scott-Pendlebury) moves in to look after Sharon, and is later joined by her son, Matt (Ashley Paske). Dorothy Burke (Maggie Dence) purchases the house in 1990 when Hilary moves away, and her niece and nephew, Tiffany (Amber Kilpatrick) and Ryan (Richard Norton), later move in. After they leave, Dorothy takes in Toby Mangel (Ben Geurens) when his father remarries and moves away, and later Phoebe Bright (Simone Robertson) after her father suffers a heart attack. Phoebe gives birth to a daughter, Hope, and she marries Stephen Gottlieb (Lochie Daddo). Dorothy rents the house to Phoebe and Stephen after she moves away with Toby and her new fiancé. The Gottliebs decide to take in lodgers and their first was Russell Butler (Stephen Whittaker), who kidnaps Hope and refuses to pay his rent. He later flees Ramsay Street. The next lodgers are Beth Brennan (Natalie Imbruglia) and Stephen's brother, Mark (Bruce Samazan). Phoebe and Stephen leave Erinsborough and Mark takes in Annalise Hartman (Kimberley Davies) and Rick Alessi (Dan Falzon). From then on the house was seen to be more of a share house, always taking in the rejects from the rest of the street. Mark's sister, Serendipity (Raelee Hill), moves in, following Annalise's departure.

Luke (Bernard Curry) and Jen Handley (Alyce Platt) move in and Rick moves out. Luke and Serendipity move to Japan and not long after Cody Willis (Peta Brady) moves in. Sarah Beaumont (Nicola Charles) moves in with her sister, Catherine O'Brien (Radha Mitchell), who later leaves for England with Malcolm Kennedy (Benjamin McNair). Teacher Lisa Elliott (Kate Straub) moves in for a while as well as Ben Atkins (Brett Cousins) and his sister, Caitlin (Emily Milburn). Ben and Caitlin move out in 1998 and Sarah's new housemates are Joel Samuels (Daniel MacPherson) and Toadfish Rebecchi (Ryan Moloney). Sarah leaves in 1999 and Lou Carpenter (Tom Oliver) buys the house at auction. Sarah's place in the house is fought over by Lance Wilkinson (Andrew Bibby) and Amy Greenwood (Jacinta Stapleton), with Lance winning. Lance later moves out and his place is taken by Dee Bliss (Madeleine West). After Joel leaves, Stuart Parker (Blair McDonough) moves in and Dee goes missing, presumed dead. Connor O'Neill (Patrick Harvey) then moves into the house and it becomes known as the "House of Trouser".

Lou decides to sell the house in 2004 and the boys buy it. Stuart's girlfriend, Sindi Watts (Marisa Warrington), moves in and so does Stuart's brother, Ned (Dan O'Connor). Stuart and Sindi leave and Connor disappears in mysterious circumstances a few months later. Toadie briefly goes to Sydney and he asks Ned to find some new tenants. Ned selects Frazer Yeats (Ben Lawson), Pepper Steiger (Nicky Whelan) and Will Griggs (Christian Clark). Ned is unaware that Toadie had promised his room to Rosetta Cammeniti (Natalie Saleeba). A vote is taken between the housemates to decide who stays and Ned is voted out. Will leaves and Frazer's younger brother, Ringo Brown (Sam Clark), moves in along with Carmella Cammeniti (Natalie Blair). Will's brother, Oliver Barnes (David Hoflin), stays briefly. Pepper leaves at the end of 2007 and Daniel Fitzgerald (Brett Tucker) moves in. Frazer and Rosetta leave for Italy and Ringo moves out. Samantha Fitzgerald (Simone Buchanan) stays in the house briefly in April 2008.

In 2008, Toadie takes in Callum Jones (Morgan Baker) as his guardian after his great-grandmother becomes ill. Libby Kennedy (Kym Valentine) and her son, Ben (Blake O'Leary), move in and she later marries Daniel. Lou also moves in after Lyn Scully (Janet Andrewartha) throws him out of Number 26; he later moves in with the Ramsay children. After their marriage falls apart, Daniel leaves town and Libby and Ben move out. Stephanie Scully (Carla Bonner) and her son move in with Toadie and Callum, while they pretend to be a couple. After the secret is exposed, Steph moves out again. Sonya Mitchell (Eve Morey) agrees to move in with Toadie and Callum and when her sister, Jade (Gemma Pranita), arrives, Toadie invites her to stay too. He later asks them to leave when he discovers Sonya is Callum's mother. Toadie and Sonya make up and she moves back in. Following Susan Kennedy's (Jackie Woodburne) separation from her husband, Toadie, invites her to move in. In early 2012, the Number 30 set underwent a makeover. On screen, Sonya pushes Toadie to redecorate and change the colour scheme from "drab plaid" and brown to a "brighter, more retro look." Towards the end of the year, Toadie's cousin, Georgia Brooks (Saskia Hampele), moves in, while their daughter Nell (Scarlett Anderson) is born at the beginning of 2013. Sonya invites Steph to move in again following her reintroduction to the serial. In June 2016, Sonya's father, Walter (Greg Stone), briefly stays, so she can support him while he tries to overcome his alcohol problems. In 2018, Hugo Somers (John Turner), Toadie's baby son with Andrea Somers (Madeleine West), comes to live at the house. Between October and December 2018, the Rebecchis' nanny, Alice Wells (Kerry Armstrong), lives at the house, until her true identity as Andrea's mother and Hugo's grandmother is revealed. Sonya dies after a short fight with cancer. Toadie invites his brother Shane Rebecchi (Nicholas Coghlan), his wife, Dipi Rebecchi (Sharon Johal), and daughters, Yashvi Rebecchi (Olivia Junkeer) and Kirsha Rebecchi (Vani Dhir), along with their dog, Clancy (Rocky), to move in to Number 30. Mackenzie Hargreaves (Georgie Stone) is later invited to stay too. After Kirsha, Clancy, Shane and Dipi leave, a recently returned Amy Greenwood temporarily moves in with Toadie, Mackenzie and Yashvi for a few months. Yashvi departs for Sydney to live with her family, whilst Amy moves back in with her daughter, Zara Selwyn (Freya Van Dyke). Melanie Pearson (Lucinda Cowden) decides to move in with Toadie when they declare that their relationship is progressing. Once Toadie and Melanie get married, they put their house up for sale, as part of one of the serial's final storylines. Amy and Zara move out and, after some convincing from the other neighbours, Toadie and Melanie decide to stay at Number 30.

When Neighbours resumes in 2023, Melanie has left Toadie. Thus, after 25 years, Toadie moves out of his house with his children and new wife, Terese, into Number 22. Remi Varga-Murphy (Naomi Rukavina) enquires about buying number 30 and views the house with her wife, Cara (Sara West), and their sons JJ (Riley Bryant) and Dex (Marley Williams). Remi's brother Taye Obasi (Lakota Johnson) later moves in.

In 2021, the real house of Number 30, 3 Pin Oak Court, sold for $1.6 million at an auction. The house was sold for $200,000 over the expected price, $1.4 million. The sale set a new record, following 5 Pin Oak Court's sale two years prior.

== No. 32 ==
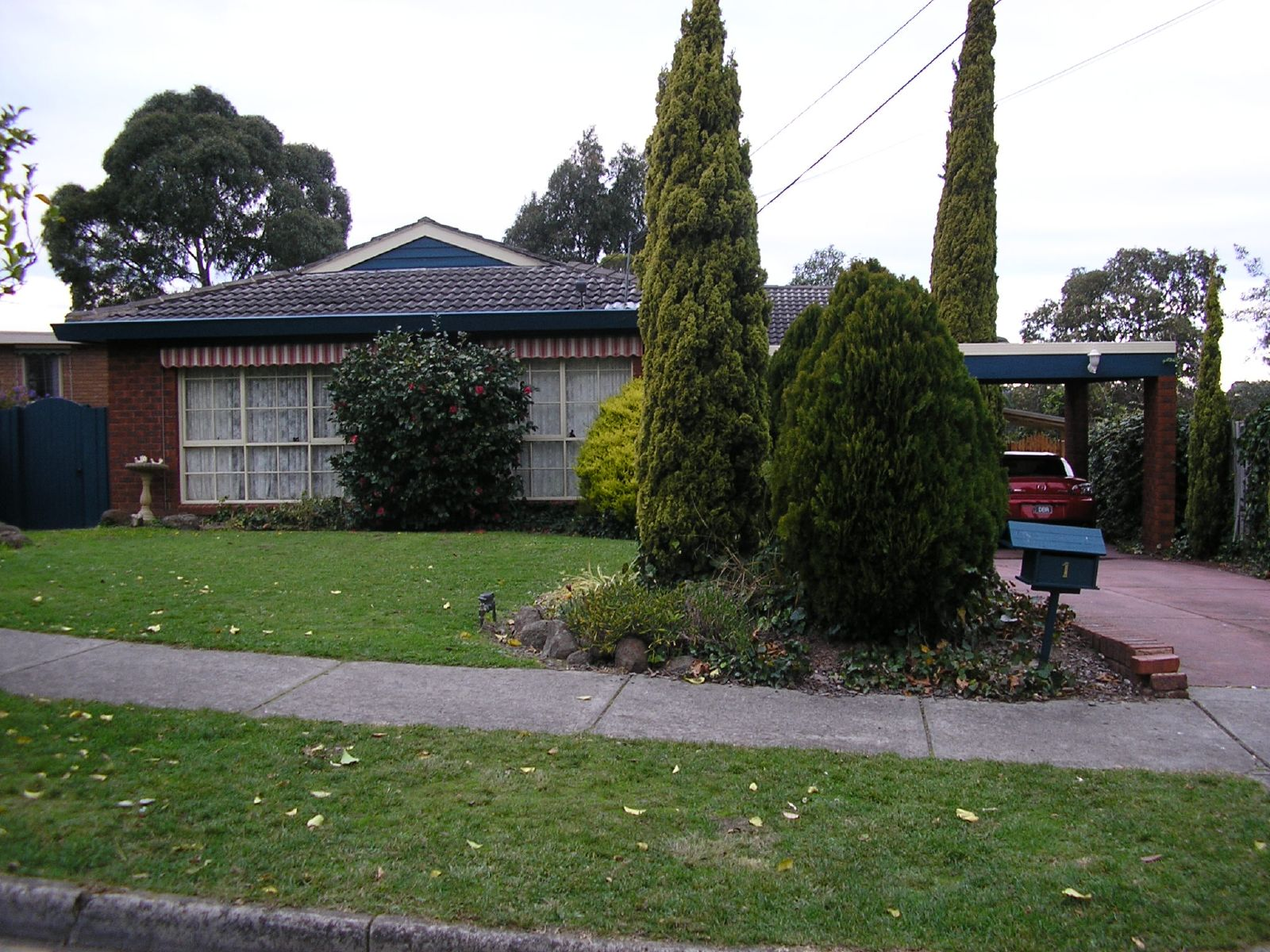
No. 32

Number 32 is first seen in 1986 when Nell Mangel (Vivean Gray) moves in, along with her granddaughter, Jane Harris (Annie Jones). The house is initially designated as number 19. Mrs Mangel takes in Harold Bishop (Ian Smith) as a lodger, before her son, Joe Mangel (Mark Little), grandson, Toby Mangel (Finn Greentree-Keane), and their dog, Bouncer (Bouncer), move in. Both Mrs Mangel and Jane soon depart, and Joe's fiancée, Kerry Bishop (Linda Hartley-Clark), and her daughter, Sky Bishop (Miranda Fryer), move in. Matt Robinson (Ashley Paske) and Melanie Pearson (Lucinda Cowden) become lodgers. After Joe and Melanie are married, they sell Number 32 and move away. The house is bought by Rosemary Daniels (Joy Chambers) on behalf of the Daniel's Corporation and it is rented to Faye Hudson (Lorraine Bayly) and her son, Cameron Hudson.

The Martin family move in and later rent it out to Malcolm Kennedy (Benjamin McNair) and Danni Stark (Eliza Szonert), and then to Angie Rebecchi (Lesley Baker) and her sons, Stonefish (Anthony Engelman) and Toadfish Rebecchi (Ryan Moloney). The house continues to be rented to several regular and recurring characters, including Ruth Wilkinson (Ailsa Piper), Mike Healey (Andrew Blackman), Tess Bell (Krista Vendy), Daniel Fitzgerald (Brett Tucker) and Dee Bliss (Madeleine West). The house is then bought by the Hancock family and later Max Hoyland (Stephen Lovatt), who lives there with his children, Boyd (Kyal Marsh) and Summer Hoyland (Marisa Siketa), and wife, Stephanie Scully (Carla Bonner). Following Max's exit, Toadfish Rebecchi and Ned Parker (Dan O'Connor) briefly move in as lodgers. At the end of 2006, a hostage situation storyline involving Steph, her son, Charlie Hoyland (Aaron Aulsebrook-Walker), Toadfish, Zeke Kinski (Matthew Werkmeister) and Katya Kinski (Dichen Lachman) occurs at the house, after Guy Sykes (Fletcher Humphrys) threatens them with a gun. Steph later has Libby Kennedy, Ty Harper (Dean Geyer) and Zeke Kinski stay.

In 2010, the new Erinsborough High principal, Michael Williams (Sandy Winton), moves in with his daughter, Natasha Williams (Valentina Novakovic). Michael departs in 2012, leaving Natasha alone in the house. The house is later sold to Troy Miller (Dieter Brummer). After Troy dies, the bank sells the house to Lucas Fitzgerald (Scott Major) and Vanessa Villante (Alin Sumarwata). Vanessa later invites Lou Carpenter to move in with her and Lucas. After Vanessa and Lucas move to temporary accommodation near the hospital, Lou's daughter, Lauren Turner (Kate Kendall), and her family move in. Daniel Robinson (Tim Phillipps) moves in to help the family after Matt Turner's (Josef Brown) death. Both Brad Willis (Kip Gamblin) and his father, Doug (Terence Donovan), move into Number 32 in 2016, marking the first time Doug has lived on Ramsay Street in 21 years. Doug dies shortly after. Following Brad and Lauren's exits, they rent the house to Shane Rebecchi (Nicholas Coghlan) and his family, which includes his wife Dipi Rebecchi (Sharon Johal) and their daughters Yashvi Rebecchi (Olivia Junkeer) and Kirsha Rebecchi (Vani Dhir). Dipi's sister, Mishti Sharma (Scarlet Vas), along with Kirsha's dog, Clancy (Rocky), also join them. In 2019, Number 32 became a new share house for the street after David Tanaka (Takaya Honda) and Aaron Brennan (Matt Wilson) buy it from Lauren and Brad. Residents in the house during David and Aaron's ownership have included Chloe Brennan (April Rose Pengilly), Kyle Canning (Chris Milligan), Leo Tanaka (Tim Kano), Roxy Willis (Zima Anderson), Scarlett Brady (Christie Whelan Browne), Elly Conway (Jodi Anasta), Nicolette Stone (Charlotte Chimes) and a returning Jane Harris. David and Aaron's foster child, Emmet Donaldson, and his brother, Brent Colefax, move into the house for two periods between 2020 and 2021. Unaware that she isn’t their child, David and Aaron later take in Abigail Tanaka (Mary Finn), until her true identity is revealed. Jane and Nicolette move back in, along with Nicolette, David and Aaron's real child, Isla Tanaka-Brennan (also Finn; Axelle Austin). Aaron, David, Nicolette and Isla planned to move to New York with Paul Robinson (Stefan Dennis) as part of the serial's final episodes. When Paul decides to stay in Erinsborough, everyone in Number 32 decides to remain as well.

When the show was rebooted, Leo had bought number 32 and it had again become a sharehouse after Byron Stone (Xavier Molyneux), Mackenzie Hargreaves (Georgie Stone), Haz Devkar (Shiv Palekar) and his dog Trevor (Bodhi) move in. They later offer Krista Sinclair (Majella Davis) their spare bedroom, and she accepts the invitation to move into the house. Later in the year, Leo faces financial difficulties and plans to sell the house back to Aaron, who is mourning David's death. The house is ultimately sold to next door neighbour Vera Punt (Sally-Anne Upton), who attempts to take advantage of her position. In late 2024, following Mackenzie and Haz's departure, Vera sells number 34 and moves in. Vera soon moves Max Ramsay (Ben Jackson) into the house, after which Sadie Rodwell (Emerald Chan) agrees to move in permanently. Max and Byron search for a new housemate after Vera moves out, and Max invites Taye Obasi (Lakota Johnson) to move in.

== No. 34 ==
Number 34 is situated on the corner of Ramsay Street. It is featured in the 8000th episode, broadcast on 21 December 2018, only, when its reclusive owner Valerie Grundy (Patti Newton), who has lived there for 34 years, dies in the sitting room. As other Ramsay Street residents enter the house, they discover Val was a hoarder and has acquired a variety of items from characters who lived on the street over the years. The following month, Val's sister Vera Punt (Sally-Anne Upton) was introduced. She initially comes to retrieve her sister's dog Regina Grundy (Timba), but later moves into the property. Vera continues to make appearances over the next few years, including in the final episode. In late 2024, Vera sells the house to an unseen buyer and moves to number 32.

== Reception ==
Former executive producer of Neighbours Don Battye described the street in 1989: "Let's face it, it's a court, a dead-end street, it doesn't go anywhere. It's very much a community. Frankly, if you – in that one street – had somebody murdered, somebody with AIDS, somebody was an alcoholic, and one of the kids on drugs, you'd end up (with something) as outrageous as Peyton Place." Peter Conrad of The Guardian commented, "Ramsay Street is a picture of innocence in comparison with dank, skulking Coronation Street or the war zone of Albert Square." The Age's Frank Barrett said the lifestyle presented in Neighbours was "undeniably seductive" and wrote, "Ramsay Street is free of war, disease, hunger and poverty. The sun shines, the outdoor pool is always warm and, while there is no past, the future always looks good."

In September 2010, Ramsay Street came first in a poll to find out which television property is the best. The open plan houses in the street gained forty per cent of the vote. During a hostage situation in Number 32, Roz Laws of the Sunday Mercury noted "Ramsay Street becomes a disaster zone, it's almost as dangerous as Summer Bay these days". A Sunday Mail reporter observed, "Ramsay Street is the friendly sort of place where folk move into and out of each other's houses. It's much like Goldilocks testing the contents of the bears' house, depending on which love crisis the scriptwriters have brought to a head that week."

In 2019, the Royal Australian Mint released an Australian one-dollar coin with a Neighbours theme. It was minted as part of the companies "Great Aussie Coin Hunt 1" series, a selection of alphabetical one dollar coins with each letter representing an Australian symbol. The N coin was dedicated to Neighbours and was complete with a Ramsay Street sign.
