= Serendipity Gottlieb =

- Neighbours character
- Portrayed by: Raelee Hill
- Duration: 1994–1995
- First appearance: 25 August 1994
- Last appearance: 7 September 1995
- Introduced by: Stanley Walsh
In-universe information
- Occupation: Nanny; Waitress; Jewellery and fashion designer
- Father: Dave Gottlieb
- Mother: Sally Dawes
- Brothers: Stephen Gottlieb; Mark Gottlieb

Serendipity "Ren" Gottlieb is a fictional character from the Australian television soap opera Neighbours, played by Raelee Hill. Hill was spotted by the serial's casting director in a café, while she was on a break from filming another show. She was told to audition for the role, as she looked exactly how the producers had imagined Serendipity to look. She made her first appearance during the episode broadcast on 25 August 1994. Serendipity was introduced as the sister of Mark Gottlieb (Bruce Samazan). Having been raised in a hippy commune, Serendipity retains her beliefs and is a "real bohemian". She moves in with Mark after returning to Australia from Amsterdam, where she worked as a nanny. During her time in the show she becomes good friends with Sam Kratz (Richard Grieve) and Annalise Hartman (Kimberley Davies), is almost beaten up by her boyfriend, becomes a designer and gets engaged to Luke Handley (Bernard Curry). Hill left the show after her contract was not renewed and her final scenes aired on 7 September 1995.

== Casting ==
Raelee Hill was spotted by Neighbours' casting director Jan Russ while she was on a break from filming on Blue Heelers. She often took her breaks in a café next to the Network Ten studio, where Neighbours was filmed, and Russ recognised Hill from her time on Paradise Beach. Hill commented "We got talking and she asked me to audition for the role of Serendipity Gottlieb." She later said that Russ had told her she looked "exactly" how the producers had imagined the character to look. Hill secured the part after attending the audition.

== Development ==
The character's fictional backstory explained that she enjoyed living in the hippy communes with her parents when she was younger, and she retains her beliefs in the healing properties of crystals and rebirth. Josephine Monroe, author of Neighbours: The First 10 Years, described Serendipity as "one of life's free spirits" and wrote that she is ruled by her heart rather than her head. The character's name was later shortened to the "delight" of Hill, and the character became commonly known as Ren. Hill said Ren and her brothers all had a "fantastic upbringing", but where Mark Gottlieb (Bruce Samazan) wants security, Ren is a "real bohemian and has a really great collection of crushed velvet smocks". Hill also said that playing Ren was "like taking a trip down memory lane", as she had been into the hippy lifestyle when she was a teenager. She hung out with people similar to Ren, once sang in a medieval chanting group and shopped for her clothes at markets, but unlike her character, she grew out of it. A reporter for the Dumfries and Galloway Standard thought Hill's background helped her bring real conviction to the role. Hill also revealed that one of the show's directors told Hill that she looked like his idea of a hippy.

Ren comes to Erinsborough to move in with Mark after travelling the world and working as a nanny in Amsterdam. She soon secures a job as a nanny to Cheryl Stark's (Caroline Gillmer) daughter Louise Carpenter (Tessa Taylor). Hill admitted that working with the baby who played Louise had put her off motherhood for the time being, adding that she was happy to hand her back at the end of filming. Ren "brought a breath of fresh air" into Mark's life. Their contemporary home decor reflected their personalities, and Andrew Anastasios of The Age wrote: "They are younger, less conservative, and Ren is 'a hippy fashion designer'." When Ren begins working with Danni Stark (Eliza Szonert) on her fashion business, her personality begins to change and for a time she starts driving a BMW as "the power goes to her head." After Ren befriends Sam Kratz (Richard Grieve), Pauline Cronin of Sunday World reported that the characters looked set to start a romance. Hill told her that it was a case of opposites attracting, and said "If only romances in Neighbours ever got a chance to get off the ground, then perhaps Sam and Serendipity could be destined for a big relationship." However, she continued saying that there is a feeling from the start that both characters would move on to other people "pretty fast". Things get off to a bad start when Sam grows jealous of Ren's friend Paulo Cechero (Hannes Berger), but Hill hoped the pair would get over that "little hiccup" and get together, as she was keen to work closer with Grieve. She described him as "one of the best friends" she had ever had, and revealed how he had shown her around Melbourne when she joined the cast and helped her settle in.

Writers established a romantic relationship between Ren and her housemate Luke Handley (Bernard Curry). The pair end up kissing after Ren helps Luke out as he is hassled by a group of men at the Coffee Shop. Of the development, Hill explained "They end up falling into bed together that evening. When they wake up the next morning, they realise that their relationship has changed forever." Jason Herbison of Inside Soap observed that the couple should take things slowly, as it is awkward for friends to become lovers. However, in the storyline, Ren is so "certain about her feelings for Luke" that she is ready to tell everyone about their relationship. She later suggests they continue having sex, but also date other people, which Luke has doubts about. Hill pointed out that Luke finds it hard to make a commitment as the death of his younger sister has led him afraid to get close to anyone. The storyline led to the departure of Hill's character and temporary departure of Handley's. Ren and Luke work out their differences and get engaged. They leave Erinsborough for Japan, where Luke has been offered a job.

Hill departed the show after her contract was not renewed. Curry criticised the decision, saying "The powers that be will come to realise what a mistake they've made." After her departure, Hill said that she was concentrating on her other interests, such as singing and dancing. She also attended auditions for several films. Hill admitted that she did not want to take on another soap opera role at the time, unless it was for a guest appearance. She added that she spoke with the producer of Neighbours and told them she would be interested in coming back one day, especially as Ren's story with Luke is left unresolved. Hill later appeared in the soap opera spoof Shark Bay.

== Storylines ==
Serendipity arrives in Erinsborough after working as a nanny in Amsterdam, having last seen her brothers Mark and Stephen Gottlieb (Lochie Daddo) at their mother's funeral. Mark is happy to have his sister around, and as he and Rick Alessi (Dan Falzon) are looking for a new housemate, Serendipity moves in straight away. She soon strikes up a friendship with Sam Kratz and they grow close. Sam meets Chip Kelly (Martin Crewes) through the Erinsborough football team and he and Serendipity begin a relationship. Chip suffers from mood swings and Karl Kennedy (Alan Fletcher) wonders if he is abusing steroids. Serendipity comes to the same realisation when she tries to stop his advances and he gets violent. Serendipity narrowly manages to escape without injury. When Serendipity gets home she tells the story to Sam, Mark and Annalise Hartman (Kimberley Davies). Sam goes and beats Chip up, which Serendipity disapproves of. Serendipity and Annalise then start up self-defence classes for the residents of Ramsay Street.

Serendipity helps to repair other people's relationships. She acts as a go-between for Rick and Cody Willis (Peta Brady) and Mark and Annalise. Her hippy background proves to be useful for Brett Stark (Brett Blewitt) when she helps him make a love potion in his quest to win Libby Kennedy's (Kym Valentine) heart. Serendipity agrees to be one of Annalise's bridesmaids at her wedding to Mark. Serendipity proves to be a friend for both her brother and Annalise after their wedding is called off, following Mark's revelation that he wants to become a priest.

Serendipity and Danni Stark begin making jewellery and start selling it. They build their business up after demand grows and Serendipity begins dating Kingston White (Simon Wilton). Serendipity begins to change and becomes very driven by business and making money. She and Danni get involved in the fashion world, but when Serendipity discovers that their clothes are being created in an illegal sweat shop, she is horrified. Serendipity breaks down and rips up her designs. Mark supports her during this time, as does Luke Handley. Serendipity realises that she is not cut out for the fashion industry and goes back to her old self. She also strikes up a friendship with Lucy Robinson (Melissa Bell). Serendipity and Luke begin a relationship, but they both find it difficult to take the step from friends to lovers. Mark falls from the roof of Number 22 and ends up in a coma, this reunites Serendipity and Luke and Luke proposes. Serendipity is shocked, but she accepts. Luke is offered a job in Japan and Serendipity decides to go with him. Their relationship does not last and Luke eventually returns to Erinsborough.

== Reception ==
Jessica Adams from The Sun-Herald said the character's name was "freakish." But a reporter for the Daily Mirror commented that she was "delightfully named", and said Mark and Rick "need worry no more" about finding a new housemate with her arrival. Another critic for the paper observed that "despite her name, Serendipity is not making Mark happy. In fact he's convinced his sister is only interested in sponging off him." The BBC said Serendipity's most notable moment was "Discovering a sweat shop for illegal immigrants and shutting it down." An Inside Soap reporter included Serendipity in a feature profiling soap opera characters with odd names. They noted that "if you're stuck while playing Scrabble, ask if Ramsay Street characters are allowed, and this hippy sister of chef Mark might well come to your rescue. Serendipity means 'a happy accident' - so we can only assume this baby was a surprise for the Gottliebs?"
