= Linda Newton =

Linda Newton may refer to:

- Linda Newton (wrestling)
- Linda Newton (actress), see My Two Wives
