= Luke Handley =

- Neighbours character
- Portrayed by: Bernard Curry
- Duration: 1995–1996, 2005
- First appearance: 7 March 1995
- Last appearance: 27 July 2005
- Introduced by: Stanley Walsh (1995); Ric Pelizzeri (2005)
In-universe information
- Occupation: Waiter; Timeshare salesman Police constable
- Sisters: Jen Handley; Morgan Handley

Luke Handley is a fictional character from the Australian soap opera Neighbours, played by Bernard Curry. He made his first screen appearance during the episode broadcast on 7 March 1995. Luke's storylines included a brief fling with Libby Kennedy (Kym Valentine), a relationship with Serendipity Gottlieb (Raelee Hill), suffering a breakdown, being diagnosed with cancer and starting a relationship with Danni Stark (Eliza Szonert). He departed on 17 December 1996, but Curry reprised the role in 2005 for the 20th anniversary.

== Casting ==
Curry's casting was publicised in the 4 March 1995 issue of TV Week. Amanda Ruben reported that he was latest cast member to join Neighbours as part of Network Ten's revamp of the serial. Of his casting, Curry stated: "I am rapt that I got the part, because I knew that there was a lot of real competition. It's a good gig for anyone and you can do nothing but learn from it. If handled correctly it can only boost your career." Curry told Ruben that he disagreed with people who say joining a soap opera would be bad for "a serious actor's career". He also admitted that he could see himself staying with the show for a year, so he did not get stuck in "a groove". He made his first appearance on 7 March 1995.

== Development ==
=== Introduction and characterisation ===
The character was introduced as the younger brother of Jen Handley (Alyce Platt). The character shares a similar fictional backstory to Jen, as he too has been "deeply affected" by the death of their sister. Luke comes to Ramsay Street "determined" to start a new life. The character was billed as "easygoing". Ruben (TV Week) said "his big blue eyes and charming personality sends hearts fluttering, and ensures Luke is well received by the residents of Ramsay Street." A writer for TV Soap described Luke as "a very likeable, laidback character" and wrote that he "immediately catches the eye of all the girls at the Street!" The character was also branded a "heart-throb", which Curry did not mind, but he did not believe it himself.

Luke's first scenes establish that he has just finished university and is looking for a new place to live. With siblings Serendipity Gottlieb (Raelee Hill) and Mark Gottlieb (Bruce Samazan) needing someone to help out with the rent, Luke comes by to take a look around their share house. He moves into Rick Alessi's (Dan Falzon) old room. Unable to find "professional work" with his degree, Luke finds employment delivering pizzas.

=== Libby Kennedy ===
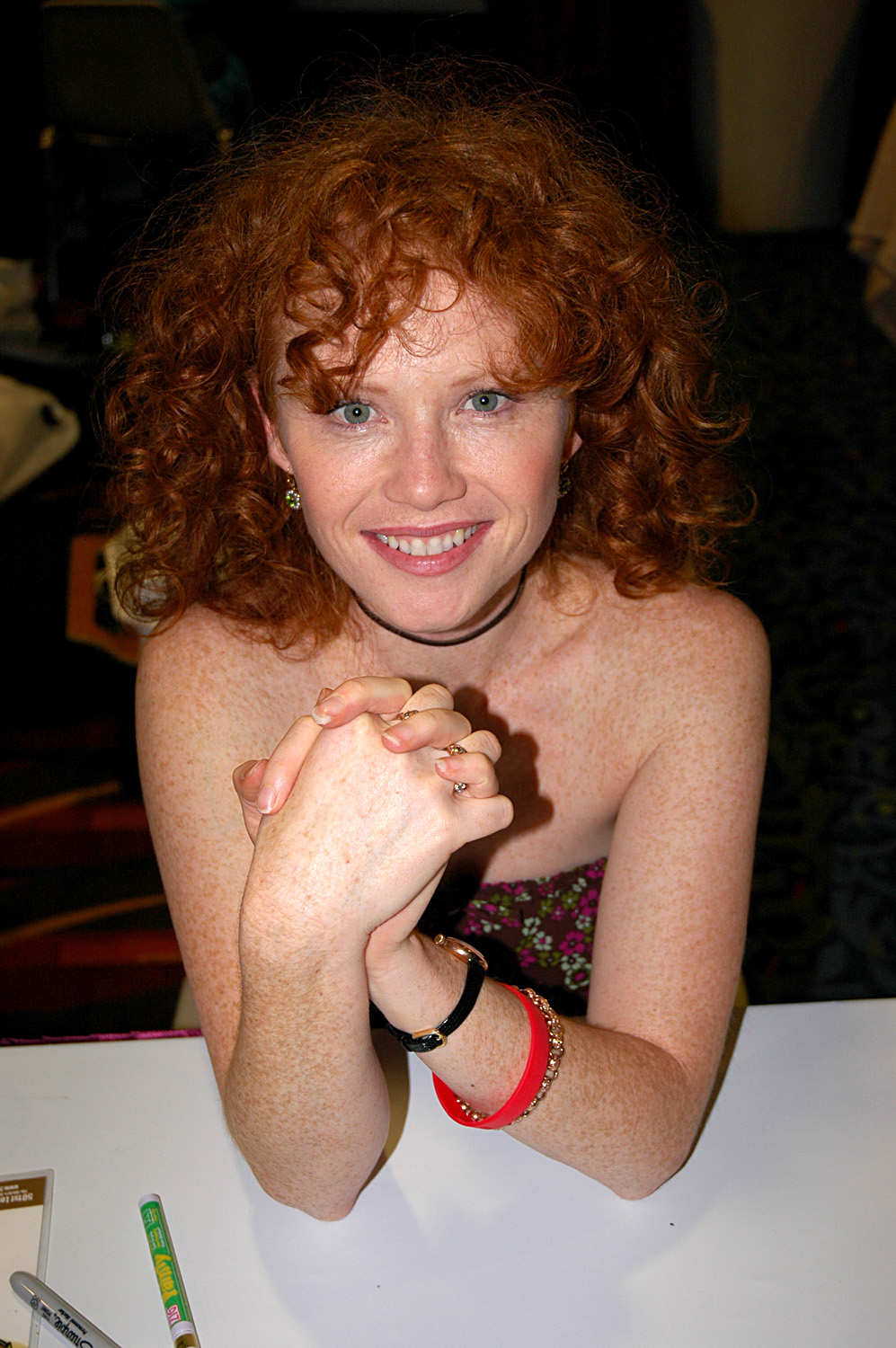
Luke's relationship with Serendipity Gottlieb, played by Raelee Hill (pictured), culminated in a proposal and temporary departure from the serial.

Shortly after he arrives in Erinsborough, Luke becomes attracted to his neighbour Libby Kennedy (Kym Valentine). However, since Libby is still at school, Luke fights off her obvious romantic advances. But when Luke agrees to pose for some photographs taken by Libby, she throws herself at him and he realises that he can no longer resist. Luke and Libby begin dating and she falls "head over heels" in love with him. Curry told Inside Soap's Jason Herbison "Libby had set her sights on Luke – she's fascinated by him, excited by his outspokenness. When they end up kissing one day Luke doesn't know what to do so he goes along with it, but to be honest I'm not sure that he's really convinced." Libby's parents disapproves of the relationship and became convinced that Luke is taking advantage of their daughter. Luke decides to end the relationship because he does not see a future for them, which devastates Libby.

=== Serendipity Gottlieb ===
When Luke is hassled by some guys in The Coffee Shop, his housemate Serendipity Gottlieb helps him out. To thank her, Luke gives her a kiss. Jason Herbison of Inside Soap said their "passion burns hotter than Luke's deep-fat fryer!" Hill stated "They end up falling into bed together that evening. When they wake up the next morning, they realise that their relationship has changed forever." Luke and Ren realise that they have to take things slowly because although Ren is certain about her feelings for Luke, he is not so sure about her. When Ren suggests that they continue having sex together while seeing other people, Luke has serious doubts about their relationship. Hill believed that Luke found it hard to make a commitment to Ren because the death of his younger sister made him afraid to get close to anyone.

Luke and Ren's relationship remains on and off for a while, until he proposes to her. When Ren's brother Mark has an accident that leaves him in a coma, Luke makes sure he is there to provide her with support. Ren becomes "increasingly distraught" about Mark and the only person who gives her a shoulder to cry on is Luke. The situation brings Ren and Luke closer together. Curry said "It's been up and down for a while, but now Luke realises how much he needs Ren. They often talk and realise they're deeply in love. That's when Luke asks Ren to marry him." Although the proposal was something Ren had been "dying to hear", she tells Luke that she needs time to think about it.

During this time, Curry was told his contract was not being renewed and his character would be written out. On-screen, Luke is offered a job in Japan and asks Ren to come with him. Curry commented "Luke lines up a job teaching English abroad. They will leave the show together, presumably to get married." Hill was also written out of Neighbours at the same time. However, producers asked Curry to return seven weeks later and he accepted. When Luke comes back to Erinsborough, he reveals that he and Ren ended their relationship while they were in Japan.

=== Non-Hodgkin lymphoma ===
In an issue based storyline, the character is diagnosed with Non-Hodgkin lymphoma. The plot was written to last for four months and follows Luke through his diagnosis and treatment. Curry carried out research in to how a serious illness affects people of a similar age to him. He told Scott Ellis of The Daily Telegraph: "A lot of people don't know what those with a serious illness really go through. As well as the pain and treatment, there's also the way they are treated by others which can have an enormous effect on the person." Curry also attended camps for children with serious illness, where he spoke with some of them to gain a better understanding of what his character would be going through. He explained that many preconceptions came across as "very condescending", and many children did not want friends to be over sympathetic, instead preferring to be treated as normal. As the storyline progresses, Luke undergoes chemotherapy and in order "to head off the sympathy from fellow Ramsay-streeters", he chooses to cut off his hair before it falls out. Curry asked for the scenes to be written so he was the one cutting his own hair. He quipped "I don't mind trying new looks, so I thought why not!" He also confirmed that he would be growing it back eventually.

=== Departure ===
In August 1996, it was announced that Curry had quit Neighbours for good. Curry said "I'm moving on because I just think I'd like to challenge myself further. I've got some big storylines coming up, but then I'll be leaving." He finished filming in October. Curry spent just over a year in total playing Luke. In 2005, it was confirmed that Curry would be reprising his role of Luke for a cameo appearance in the show's 20th anniversary episode "Friends for Twenty Years".

== Storylines ==
Luke follows his sister Jen to Ramsay Street and moves in with Mark Gottlieb and his sister, Serendipity. He finds employment at The Holy Roll. He attracts the attention of Libby Kennedy, who uses him as a subject for her photography. Luke feels an attraction to Libby, but he knows that she is far too young for him and he tries to stay out of her way rather than tell her. Libby's father, Karl (Alan Fletcher), learns of Libby's crush and he witnesses her kissing Luke in the Coffee Shop. He tells Luke to stay away from his daughter and Luke turns his attentions to Serendipity. They attempt to be a couple, but ultimately decide to be friends and Luke denies his feelings for her. However, Mark falls from a roof and ends up in a coma. After seeing how much pain Serendipity is in, Luke decides to propose to her. She accepts and they start planning their future, but that changes when Luke is offered a job teaching English in Japan. They decide to move to Japan together.

A few months later, Billy Kennedy (Jesse Spencer) notices strange noises around the community bus and it is revealed that Luke is back from Japan. Luke agrees to see Karl, who realises that Luke is having a breakdown after things with Serendipity had gone wrong. Luke eventually agrees to stay at the Robinson's until he is feeling better. Jen returns and Luke moves in with her and finds work as a timeshare salesman. Luke meets Kimberley Stevens (Rebecca Macauley) and she reveals that she is a policewoman. Their relationship falls apart after Kimberley leads a stakeout in Ramsay Street, during which Cody Willis (Peta Brady) is shot and killed. However, Luke decides to join the police force. Luke is happy to find a career that he likes and proceeds with the training. However, after a routine medical, Luke is told that he is suffering from non-Hodgkin's lymphoma. Luke immediately begins chemotherapy and he shaves his hair off. Luke's suffers from mood swings and at one point, he chooses to stop the chemotherapy. However, he is given hope by Charlie Moyes (Damien Bodie), a young boy he meets at a camp for terminally ill children.

Luke receives much support from Debbie Martin (Marnie Reece-Wilmore) and Danni Stark (Eliza Szonert) and they invite him to live with them. Luke finds Debbie's attentions smothering and he seeks comfort in Danni. They begin a relationship, but Danni struggles to cope with Luke's condition. Debbie becomes upset at losing Luke and tries to win him over, but fails. Luke is thrilled when he is told that his cancer has gone into remission. He attempts to rebuild his life, but he feels that his condition is holding him back at job interviews. Danni is given a chance to further her fashion career in Malaysia for six months and she leaves. Luke becomes a shoulder to cry on for Joanna Hartman (Emma Harrison), Catherine O'Brien (Radha Mitchell) and Sarah Beaumont (Nicola Charles). He gives a talk at the school on surviving cancer and Susan Kennedy (Jackie Woodburne) encourages him to train as a teacher. Luke hears that Danni has been diagnosed with malaria and he flies to Malaysia. He and Danni settle down there and Luke completes his police training. Nine years later, Luke appears in Annalise Hartman's documentary film about Ramsay Street.

== Reception ==
For his portrayal of Luke, Curry was nominated for Best Actor at the 1997 Inside Soap Awards, while the Non-Hodgkin lymphoma plot was nominated for Most Dramatic Storyline of the Last Year. A writer for the BBC's Neighbours website stated that Luke's most notable moment was "Posing as Sarah Beaumont's boyfriend when her ex visited from the UK." Matthew Clifton from Heckler Spray included Luke in his list of "The Best Ever Mid-90s Neighbours Characters". Clifton explained "Luke was actually a total dweeb who postured around the soap doing nothing, living in that weird house all the young randoms seem to be put in when they don't know what else to do with them. Luke had a cancer scare but even that didn't make him interesting. His only decent moment was when he 'haunted' the recreation centre, on a secret return from his apparent new life in Japan. Appearing at the end of an episode, when the haunting was supposed to be terrifying us, Luke stood on the roof of the rec's old open top bus and smoked a cigar nonchalantly, for no apparent reason." Jason Herbison from Inside Soap called Luke and Ren's relationship "the rockiest romance in Ramsay Street." When the Non-Hodgkin lymphoma storyline began, a critic for The Daily Telegraph chose the episode as part of their "Tune in" feature, and stated: "What's this? Neighbours tackling a serious subject? Hopefully this is the start of a return to the old form."
