= Malcolm Kennedy =

- Neighbours character
- Portrayed by: Benjamin McNair
- Duration: 1994–1997, 2002, 2004–2005, 2011, 2014, 2022–2023
- First appearance: 3 October 1994
- Last appearance: 14 November 2023
- Introduced by: Ian Bradley (1994); Stanley Walsh (2002); Ric Pellizzeri (2004); Susan Bower (2011); Jason Herbison (2014)
In-universe information
- Occupation: Student; Surf shop assistant; Waiter; Handyman; Cuppa Diem salesman
- Family: Kennedy
- Father: Karl Kennedy
- Mother: Susan Kennedy
- Brothers: Billy Kennedy
- Sisters: Libby Kennedy
- Half-sisters: Holly Hoyland
- Wife: Catherine O'Brien (2001–?; separated)
- Daughters: Susannah Kennedy
- Grandfathers: Tom Kennedy (adoptive); Ron Davies-Smythe
- Grandmothers: Molly Kennedy; Grace Smith
- Aunts: Carmel Tyler; Liz Conway; Jemima Davies-Smythe
- Nephews: Ben Kirk; Jackson Kennedy
- First cousins: Darcy Tyler; Elly Conway; Bea Nilsson; Trudy Callhoun
- Other relatives: Aster Conway; Jasper Callhoun

Malcolm Kennedy is a fictional character from the Australian television soap opera Neighbours, played by Benjamin McNair. Shortly after he was cast, McNair relocated to Melbourne to be closer to the studio. He admitted that it was a shock leaving his family and friends in Sydney. The older members of the cast eventually helped him feel more comfortable. He made his first appearance during the episode broadcast on 3 October 1994, as he arrives on Ramsay Street with his parents and siblings. An early storyline for Malcolm was a romance with Danni Stark (Eliza Szonert), to whom he lost his virginity. Other storylines explored a friendship with Stonefish Rebecchi (Anthony Engleman), a career as a handyman and later, coffee chain salesman, and marriage to Catherine O'Brien (Radha Mitchell). The character's departure aired on 11 March 1997. McNair made two brief returns in 2002 and 2004, and a year later he reprised his role for the show's 20th anniversary. In July 2011, Malcolm returns to help his parents with their marriage and has a brief affair with Jade Mitchell (Gemma Pranita). McNair returned to Neighbours in October 2014 for the 20th anniversary of the Kennedys' introduction. He also reprised his role in July 2022 for the show's final episodes and again in 2023.

== Creation and casting ==
In 1994, the Neighbours' storyliners decided to introduce the "solid" Kennedy family as they felt that they needed to take the show back to its roots when it seemed that all the houses on Ramsay Street were populated with misfits and distant relatives. McNair joined the cast as eldest sibling Malcolm, brother to Libby (Kym Valentine) and Billy (Jesse Spencer). McNair, who had previously had small guest roles in Home and Away and G.P., was surprised when he secured the role. He was working in a café at the time and was due to move to Cairns for six months. He only had three days to pack up his house and relocate from Sydney to Melbourne for filming. McNair admitted that while he was pleased to get the role, he was not so keen on moving, saying "it was a real shock leaving my family and friends to move into an apartment on my own, then having to turn up at work not knowing anybody in the cast." McNair said the older cast members helped him out, making him feel more comfortable, and after a year in the role, McNair was happier about staying on.

== Development ==
=== Characterisation ===
Malcolm is the eldest Kennedy child. He was 17 upon his introduction, four years younger than McNair, who found the age gap made a big difference. He explained to Woman's Erica Goatly: "I've been through the teenage years and have sorted myself out, while Mal's still going through it." McNair also thought he was very different to his character. Malcolm is an athlete, who enjoys being in charge. He is "strong-willed" and often clashes with Libby. Following his arrival, Malcolm quickly gets involved in Ramsay Street "shenanigans". An early storyline sees Malcolm showing off his gun when it accidentally goes off and shoots Lou Carpenter (Tom Oliver) in the leg.

=== Relationship with Danni Stark ===
In a bid to increase ratings, producers plotted a Romeo and Juliet-style romance between Malcolm and Danni Stark (Eliza Szonert). Jason Herbison of Inside Soap said "Love blooms soon after Danni Stark sets eyes on Malcolm, but their road to love is a rocky one, dogged by family feuds and a dark secret! But will love conquer all?" Malcolm was initially shown to be attracted to Bianca Zanotti (Annie Gagliardi), but when he makes a romantic advance, she slaps him and he turns to Danni for comfort. As she reassures him, Malcolm realises that Danni is the one he should be dating. Malcolm soon finds himself "out of his depth" with his more sexually experienced girlfriend. McNair told Goatly that his character is a virgin and does not feel able to tell Danni, so he comes across as standoffish. Once Malcolm tells Danni the truth, she seduces him. McNair said, "After they've had sex he feels great and from then on it develops into an upfront, mature sexual relationship."

McNair admitted to being nervous when it came to kissing Szonert, as it marked his first on-screen kiss. He asked Szonert and co-star Richard Grieve for advice, and found it "wasn't such a big deal" because he got on well with Szonert. The kissing scenes also gave McNair confidence in his acting ability. He explained, "You have to feel what your character is feeling, but it was great because I was also able to separate the screen situation from myself." Malcolm and Danni become inseparable, and although their parents disapprove, they rent Number 32, so they can have some privacy. The relationship continues to develop quickly, and is soon tested by a pregnancy scare after Malcolm and Danni forget to use contraception while they spend the night at a hotel. McNair reckoned the couple were too young to be parents. The pair later live with Malcolm's best friend Stonefish Rebecchi (Anthony Engleman) after they struggle with the rent, and his mother also comes to stay. Malcolm and Danni later move back to their old homes.

=== Accident ===
During the 1996 end-of-season cliffhanger, Malcolm's windpipe is crushed during an accident at Chez Chez, where he is doing some repair work with Darren Stark (Todd MacDonald). Malcolm trips over a dustsheet and causes a plank holding paint and tools to fall on his neck. Darren and Karl pull the plank off Malcolm's neck and find Malcolm cannot breathe. Karl realises the only way to save Malcolm is to perform an emergency tracheotomy. However, Karl has not practiced medicine since Cheryl Stark's (Caroline Gillmer) death, which he believes he caused. Jason Herbison of Inside Soap said "Karl freezes, and unless he gets his nerve back, he could have more blood on his conscience." Karl manages to perform the procedure and saves Malcolm's life. McNair later called the storyline "awesome" and revealed it was his favourite.

=== Departure ===
McNair chose to depart Neighbours in 1997. His exit aired on 11 March 1997, along with Radha Mitchell's, who plays Malcolm's love interest Catherine O'Brien. On-screen, Malcolm decides to go travelling after learning that Catherine has had an affair with Darren Stark. Malcolm punches Darren, before announcing his intentions to leave Erinsborough. Catherine tries to get him to change his mind, but Malcolm packs his bags and goes to the airport. Catherine books a ticket on the same plane and asks to come with him. Malcolm finds it "tough" to forgive Catherine, as he has been hurt by her betrayal, but he eventually agrees to let her come and they reunite as they leave for Europe.

=== Return (2002) ===
In February 2002, Tim Randall of the Daily Record reported McNair had reprised his role for six weeks. The actor stated "It's been five years since Mal packed his bags and went to England and that's five full years of doing other things for me. But I learnt a lot doing Neighbours and coming back for a stint is perfect. Let's just say he's not the Mal he used to be." Malcolm's friends and family are pleased to see him again, but they soon come to realise that he is a changed man. Malcolm is no longer easygoing, instead he has become a ruthless entrepreneur and has his eyes on Harold Bishop's (Ian Smith) coffee shop. McNair explained "Mal has turned into a bit of a business tycoon. He's now married - though his wife Catherine is in England - and he works for a coffee shop chain called Cuppa Diem. He comes back to Erinsborough to open up a franchise, and he thinks that Harold's coffee shop is the perfect venue to launch it." Malcolm does not reveal his intentions for the coffee shop right away and just states that he is home for a visit. McNair told Inside Soap's Herbison that Malcolm is very happy to see everyone again and he has brought them all presents.

Malcolm is also really happy to see Toadfish Rebecchi (Ryan Moloney) because they used to be good friends. Toadie Rebecchi (Ryan Moloney) is the first to notice that Malcolm's ego "has grown to the size of Anson's Corner" and his reasons for returning are not all personal. Toadie later overhears Malcolm talking to Harold about the coffee shop and Cuppa Diem. He suggests that Harold joins the franchise or he will regret it. Malcolm says it with a smile, but Harold is aware that he is being threatened. Toadie attempts to question Malcolm about what he saw, but they are interrupted by a phone call that reveals his true agenda to his parents. McNair revealed "Mal gets this phone call, and from the tone of his voice, it's clear he's under pressure from London to close the coffee shop deal. It's the first Karl or Susan have heard of it, and they can't believe their son is money-driven. We get the impression that this is an issue that's really going to test the family." McNair added that he had great fun catching up with his on-screen family, as they had always been very close. At the end of his guest stint in May, Doug Anderson of The Sydney Morning Herald wished Malcolm good luck.

McNair returned again in 2004 and 2005, where he joined many former cast members reprising their roles for the show's 20th anniversary episode, "Friends for Twenty Years".

=== Return (2011) ===
On 9 May 2011, it was announced that McNair would be returning to Neighbours for a four-month guest stint. The actor begin filming his first scenes the following week and Malcolm began appearing from 18 July. Malcolm returns to Ramsay Street to help repair his parents' marriage, after Susan becomes emotionally involved with another man. Of his return, McNair said "It's great to be back. While there have been a few changes and lots of new faces, Mum (Jackie Woodburne) and Dad (Alan Fletcher) are still the same, so it really is like coming home." During an interview with Digital Spy, McNair explained that Malcolm returns to Ramsay Street to see his parents after sensing that there is a problem between them. He has also been speaking to Libby and Billy and they agree that there is trouble brewing. McNair said "Malcolm is trying to get to the bottom of it without appearing too nosy. He cares about his parents deeply and wants them to live a life of harmony, so if he can help, he'll certainly try."

The actor said Malcolm is not surprised that his parents are facing marital problems, but it may be a surprise as to where the troubles are coming from. Previous problems have come from Karl and his infidelity issues, but this is something different. McNair revealed that he thinks Malcolm does have what it takes to get things back on track for his parents as he has a lot of compassion and maturity to deal with both sides of the story. When asked if Malcolm has changed since his last appearance, McNair revealed that he is very similar and still assertive in a business sense. Malcolm is now working with a large company as an area manager and he has an air of confidence about him. He is successful and travels throughout Europe. Malcolm and his wife, Catherine, have become a professional couple and have decided not to have children.

=== Affair with Jade Mitchell ===
In October 2011, Malcolm befriends Jade Mitchell (Gemma Pranita) and they begin flirting. Jade uses Malcolm to distract her from her feelings for Kyle Canning (Chris Milligan). Jade needs some fun and she reckons Malcolm is the person to help her. However, the pair's innocent flirting turns into something more serious when Jade arranges a "late-night rendezvous" with Malcolm. Due to his father's history of infidelity, TV Week said Malcolm proves to be "a chip off the old block" when he kisses Jade. Of Jade's relationship with Malcolm, Pranita told the magazine, "The reason she goes to Malcolm is purely to gain some sort of control back in her life because everything's spiralling out of control due to these feelings she has for Kyle. Her default position is to go back to what she knows - which is to hook up with men who won't want anything serious, like taken men or people who are up for a one-night stand. He's like a safety harness really." Malcolm and Jade begin an affair, but they are forced to end it when Karl finds out about it and warns his son off.

=== Returns (2014, 2022–2023) ===
On 11 March 2014, it was announced that McNair would be returning to Neighbours to help celebrate the 20th anniversary of the Kennedys' introduction. Malcolm returned on 2 October 2014. He visits his parents to suggest that they take an early retirement and move to England to be with him and Catherine, who is pregnant. Woodburne explained, "they want Karl and Susan to help them out with the baby they're going to have. Mal and Catherine didn't think they were ever going to have any children, but surprise surprise, Catherine is pregnant and they're a bit overwhelmed! They're hoping that mum and dad can help them out." Malcolm's suggestion leads Karl and Susan to reflect on their 20-year history in Erinsborough.

McNair was one of over twenty actors who reprised their roles for the serial's final episodes, following its cancellation in early 2022. His return will air on 14 July in the UK and 21 July in Australia, as Malcolm visits his parents to tell them he and Catherine have broken up. Unbeknownst to them, he is now in a relationship with his father's former girlfriend Izzy Hoyland (Natalie Bassingthwaighte), who is hiding out at his hotel. In order to let his parents process the news about his marriage, Malcolm puts off telling them about Izzy, until she shows up on their doorstep and makes hints about their connection, leaving "a sheepish Mal" to explain that he and Izzy have fallen in love with each other. McNair reprised the role once again in 2023, following the show's return. His return was incorporated into a week of flashback episodes designed to showcase to viewers stories that occurred whilst Neighbours had ceased broadcasting.

== Storylines ==
=== 1994–1997 ===
Malcolm and his siblings are shocked when their father, Karl, suddenly moves the family to Ramsay Street. Malcolm and Libby are particularly against Karl's decision and do not express any enthusiasm when they arrive. Malcolm instantly clashes with Danni Stark and she believes he is rude. Malcolm discovers that Karl moved the family because he caused a patient's death and he is furious. Malcolm accidentally shoots Lou Carpenter (Tom Oliver) in the leg and he falls for Bianca Zanotti. After inviting Bianca over to his house, he tries to kiss her and she punches him. Malcolm tells his friends that he was mugged, but Bianca reveals the truth and Karl is disgusted at Malcolm's behaviour. Malcolm embarrasses Libby at school by reading out parts of a novel she was writing. Malcolm and Danni begin to get to know each other and Malcolm finds himself attracted to her. Malcolm kisses Danni and they begin dating. Susan forces Malcolm to get a job at the Coffee Shop. Danni puts pressure on Malcolm to have sex with her and Malcolm reveals that he is a virgin. They then wait until he is ready.

Danni and Malcolm break up, after he becomes jealous of her new friends and she looks at his paper during an exam. Malcolm's best friend, Stonefish Rebecchi (Anthony Engleman), gets him and Danni back together. The couple decide to live together and move into Number 32. Stonefish and his mother briefly move in with Malcolm and Danni. One night, Malcolm and Danni have unprotected sex and after realising how easily Danni could have got pregnant, they decide to go back to their own homes. Malcolm gets a part-time job at a local surf shop and, after passing his HSC, enrols at Eden Hills University to study Human Movement. Danni fails her exams and the couple drift apart. Malcolm and Stonefish's friendship is jeopardised by Catherine O'Brien. Stonefish likes her, but she fancies Malcolm. When Stonefish finds out, he confronts Malcolm, who tells him that nothing has happened between him and Catherine. Malcolm and Stonefish buy a car and the former owners arrive looking for some drugs they left in there. The police decide to stage a stakeout, which results in a shootout that leaves Cody Willis (Peta Brady) dead.

Malcolm briefly dates Debbie Martin (Marnie Reece-Wilmore) and decides to leave university to work as a handyman for Sam Kratz (Grieve). When Sam leaves Erinsborough, Malcolm is left in charge of the business and he eventually buys it with Darren Stark. Malcolm dates Year 12 student, Shona Munro (Bryony Price) when he begins working at the school. He ends the relationship after realising that they want different things. Malcolm then starts seeing Catherine. She rushes to his hospital bedside after Karl is forced to perform an emergency tracheotomy on him following an accident at Chez Chez. Malcolm is heartbroken when Catherine has an affair with Darren. Malcolm decides to go travelling, but he realises that he and Catherine are meant to be together and she books a ticket on the same flight as him to Europe. After travelling for a while, the couple settle in England and get married. Malcolm also begins working for Cuppa Diem.

=== 2002–2023 ===
Malcolm returns to Erinsborough five years later, to meet his new nephew, Ben (Noah Sutherland) and to find a suitable location for Cuppa Diem's first Australian branch. Malcolm tries to get Harold Bishop to sell the Coffee Shop, but Harold declines. Malcolm then asks the owner of the lease to sell and he makes an offer, which is hard to turn down. Karl is disgusted with Malcolm and Malcolm moves into a hotel. Cuppa Diem remove Malcolm from the Coffee Shop takeover job because it was taking too long to secure the deal. Malcolm realises that he has been cruel to Harold and he apologises and quits Cuppa Diem. Before Malcolm leaves, he tells his parents that he will be suing the company and that he had bought Number 32. Two years later, when Karl does not join a Kennedy family holiday in Adelaide, Malcolm comes to Erinsborough to see why. Malcolm suspects Karl is having an affair with Izzy Hoyland and he confronts Izzy, who denies this. He then decides to leave, but Karl pleads with him to stay and he reveals that nothing is going on between him and Izzy, but he and Susan are having marital problems. Malcolm tries to get his parents together to talk, but Karl resists. Malcolm runs over Libby's dog, Audrey, and this brings Karl and Susan together. Malcolm decides to sell Number 32 and he tells Max Hoyland (Stephen Lovatt) that it will be put up for auction. Malcolm then returns to London and he is later seen in Annalise Hartman's (Kimberley Davies) Ramsay Street documentary.

After seven more years away, Malcolm decides to surprise his parents with a visit and notices things are not okay when he catches them arguing. He reveals that he has spoken to Billy and Libby, but Susan reassures him that everything is fine. Malcolm decides to go and see Stonefish in Colac. When he returns he tries to ask Karl about Jim Dolan (Scott Parmeter), a dying man Susan befriended. Malcolm catches up with both Lou and Toadfish Rebecchi and notices Andrew Robinson (Jordan Smith) renting his house out to backpackers. Malcolm tells Karl not to make anything more out of Susan's friendship with Jim and to support her or he will end up driving her away. Malcolm tells Toadie about Andrew's scheme and then warns Summer Hoyland (Jordy Lucas) to end it, before she gets his parents into trouble. Malcolm accompanies his mother to the hospital when Jim collapses and he tells her not to forget about Karl. Jim dies and Malcolm comforts Susan. When she leaves for Anglesea to arrange Jim's funeral, Malcolm talks Karl out of following her and he decides to go instead. Malcolm returns alone and he unsuccessfully tries to stop Karl from joining Susan. When Susan returns, she tells Malcolm that she and Karl have decided to separate. Malcolm is angry and blames Susan, but Karl confesses it was his idea.

Malcolm begins flirting with Jade Mitchell and he begins an affair with her. Karl tells Malcolm he knows about his affair with Jade, as he saw them kissing. Karl urges Malcolm to end his relationship with Jade and he does. Susan later learns of Malcolm's affair and she is disappointed with him. Malcolm books his flight home and tells Susan he will tell Catherine what happened. Jade tells Malcolm that her sister, Sonya (Eve Morey), and Kyle Canning know about their affair and she is leaving. Malcolm tries to talk her out of it and he tells Sonya about Jade's plan. Malcolm sees Jade leaving in a taxi and goes to tell Kyle. Kyle punches Malcolm and Rhys Lawson (Ben Barber) takes him to the hospital to fix his nose. Karl and Susan thank Malcolm for visiting and they drive him to the airport.

While he is on a business trip three years later, Malcolm visits his parents and informs them that Catherine is pregnant. He then asks them to relocate to London to help him and Catherine out with the baby. However, after thinking it over, Susan and Karl decide to stay in Erinsborough. Toadie and Sonya let Malcolm look after their young daughter, Nell (Scarlett Anderson), but Malcolm struggles and he breaks their digital detox by letting Nell play with his phone. Toadie and Sonya ask Malcolm to leave, but they later apologise and let him look after Nell again, with better results. After saying goodbye to his parents, Malcolm returns home to London. Six months later, Malcolm informs Susan that Catherine has given birth to their daughter Susannah.

Eight years later, Malcolm makes a surprise visit to see his parents. They attend Toadie's engagement party together, where Malcolm reveals to his parents that he and Catherine have separated. He explains that he was keen to move back to Australia, but Catherine was not interested. This led to numerous issues between them, which made them both miserable. When Malcolm returns to his hotel room, Izzy is waiting for him and he tells her that he did not get to tell his parents about her yet. The following day, Malcolm is about to explain to Karl and Susan that he and Izzy are together when Izzy enters the house. Malcolm then says that they are together and in love. Karl and Susan yell at Malcolm for keeping it a secret and say that their relationship probably has an agenda. When Malcolm asks Susan and Karl to accept his relationship once more, Susan tells him that he must pick between her and Izzy. Malcolm picks Izzy. However, Izzy later reveals to him that she kissed Shane Ramsay (Peter O'Brien), so they break up. Malcolm later attends Toadie's wedding and watches his siblings give Toadie congratulatory messages by video, then attends their reception on Ramsay Street. The following day, as revealed in a flashback, Malcolm discovers that his half-sister, Holly Hoyland (Lucinda Armstrong Hall), is secretly in town and he agrees to keep it from Karl and Susan.

== Reception ==
The BBC said Malcolm's most notable moment was "having an accident at Chez Chez where Karl had to save his life." In 1996, the BBC censored the programme, when it edited out scenes involving Karl agonising over Malcolm's sexual activity with Danni. The broadcaster felt the scenes were inappropriate for the early evening timeslot. The Daily Mirror said that "things were looking up" for Malcolm when he started dating Shona (Bryony Price) and branded him as "the heartthrob handyman." Caroline Milburn of The Age called Malcolm a "larrikin." Michael Cregana of Inside Soap called Malcolm "the prodigal son" and said he was a "rotter" when he tried to get his hands on the Coffee Shop. In 2011, Yahoo! said that viewers should be excited that Malcolm was returning because everyone loves him. They added "you can tell from the fact that the cast always want him back that he has real chemistry with everyone on set." Cameron Adams of the Herald Sun compared Malcolm to his father when he began his affair with Jade, noting "while Karl has been a pantsman in the past, it seems his DNA has been passed on, with the very-non-single Malcolm showing some player tendencies since he's returned to Ramsay St." The character received a nomination for Best Comeback at the 2012 All About Soap Awards.
