= Linda Newton (actress) =

Australian actress

- Occupation: Actress
- Notable work: The Restless Years; Star Cops; My Two Wives

Linda Newton is an Australian actress. She played Jill Martin on Cop Shop, Trish Garrett on The Restless Years, Alice Blake on Taurus Rising, Meg on Sword of Honour, Pal Kenzy on Star Cops, and Robyn Kennedy on My Two Wives.

Linda Newton graduated from NIDA in 1977 soon after landing a short stint on Cop Shop which was extended by the producers.

On stage she appeared in The Hostage (NIDA, 1977), Catch Me if You Can (Marian Street, 1978), The Proposal (The Stables, 1981), Treats (Q Theatre, 1986), and Relatively Speaking (Forrest Theatre Company, 1988).
