= My Two Wives =

- Written by: John Flanagan; Gary Reilly
- Directed by: Sally Brady; Leigh Spence
- Starring: Peter Fisher; Linda Newton; Kym Valentine; Morna Seres; Brett Blewitt; Patrick Ward
- Composer: Mike Perjanik
- Country of origin: Australia
- Original language: English
- No. of seasons: 2
- No. of episodes: 26

Production
- Executive producer: Gary Reilly
- Producer: Gary Reilly Productions
- Production location: TCN-9 Willoughby, New South Wales
- Editor: Paul Twyford-Jones
- Running time: 30 mins

Original release
- Network: Nine Network
- Release: 8 September 1992

My Two Wives is an Australian situation comedy series produced by Gary Reilly Productions in 1992.

== Synopsis ==
My Two Wives is the story of a divorced man (Peter Fisher), who moves into an apartment with his new wife (Linda Newton) and her daughter (Kym Valentine), only to learn that his ex-wife and children reside in the apartment directly below.

== Cast ==
Sources:

- Peter Fisher as Geoffrey Kennedy
- Linda Newton as Robyn Kennedy
- Kym Valentine as Lisa Kennedy
- Morna Seres as Cathy
- Brett Blewitt as Jack Kennedy
- Chelsea Yates and Meaghan Yates as Sarah Kennedy
- Patrick Ward as Taylor
- Emma Jane Fowler as Danni

== Release ==
The series' first season of 13 episodes debuted on Channel 9 in Australia on 8 September 1992, with the second season airing in 1993.

The series was later shown on British channel Carlton Select for a time between 1996 and 1997.

== Production ==
The series was written by John Flanagan and Gary Reilly for Gary Reilly Productions. It was directed by Sally Brady and Leigh Spence. The series re-used the same set as 1991 sitcom Hampton Court.

== See also ==
- List of Australian television series
