= Brett Blewitt =

Australian actor

Brett Blewitt (born 17 November 1976) is an Australian actor known for playing Brett Stark in Neighbours from 1993 until 1996.

Blewitt attended the Keane Kids Studios, where he studied drama for three years. He then starred in the 1992 Australian sitcom My Two Wives as Jack Kennedy. He appeared alongside his future Neighbours co-star Kym Valentine.

He also had a guest role in two episodes of G.P. playing a character called Jeff, before making an appearance in Home and Away as Thomas.

In November 1993, Blewitt joined the cast of Australian soap opera Neighbours as Brett Stark, alongside Eliza Szonert who was cast as Danni Stark. He briefly returned to the show in 2005, when his character made a cameo appearance in the 20th anniversary episode. He made a further cameo in the 2023 Amazon Freevee revival as part of an Erinsborough High School closure protest story.

After leaving Neighbours, Blewitt worked as a guest on television shows and starred alongside the Olsen twins in Our Lips Are Sealed. Blewitt has been writing for production companies and is in collaboration writing with former co-star Jesse Spencer in Los Angeles.

Blewitt created an tour company called Great Race showing off his home city of Sydney.

== Acting credits ==
- My Two Wives (1992) – Jack Kennedy
- G.P. (1992) – Jeff
- Home and Away (1993) – Thomas
- Neighbours (1993–1996, 2005, 2023) – Brett Stark
- Our Lips Are Sealed (2000) – Yacht Steward
