= Danni Stark =

- Neighbours character
- Portrayed by: Eliza Szonert
- Duration: 1993–1996, 2005
- First appearance: 30 November 1993
- Last appearance: 27 July 2005
- Introduced by: Alan Coleman (1993); Ric Pellizzeri (2005)
In-universe information
- Occupation: Student; Waitress; Barmaid; Fashion designer
- Father: Maurie Stark
- Mother: Cheryl Stark
- Brothers: Darren Stark; Brett Stark
- Sisters: Janine Stark
- Half-sisters: Lolly Allen
- Grandfathers: Hector Kratz
- Grandmothers: Marlene Kratz
- Uncles: Patrick Kratz
- First cousins: Sam Kratz

Danielle "Danni" Stark is a fictional character from the Australian soap opera Neighbours, played by Eliza Szonert. She made her debut during the episode broadcast on 30 November 1993 and remained in the show until 13 November 1996, with a brief cameo in 2005 as part of the serial's twentieth anniversary. Danni is Cheryl Stark's daughter and suffered from diabetes. She had a complex, long-term relationship with Malcolm Kennedy.

== Creation and casting ==
The character of Danni was created in 1993 as part of a new family, the Starks. She joined already established characters brother Darren Stark (Todd MacDonald) and mother Cheryl Stark (Caroline Gillmer). Danni arrives with her brother Brett (Brett Blewitt), another new addition to the serial's cast. After being a part of the Neighbours cast for almost a year, Szonert said: "I'm really getting into it now, but I hated seeing myself on screen at first and the long hours and routine took a lot of getting used to."

== Development ==
Danni arrives in Ramsay Street with Brett after they are both expelled from boarding school. Upon her arrival, Danni was described as being a "tearaway" and having a "devil-may-care" attitude. Of her character, Szonert said: "Danni like to get what she wants and she can be a right little schemer. She likes to concoct plans to get her own way and can be real troublemaker." Danni can be manipulative at times, especially when she wants something. Szonert told Rochelle Tubb of The Sun-Herald that she did not share many similarities to her character, but did occasionally display some aspects of Danni's personality in real life.

Danni is diabetic. When she is caught injecting insulin with a needle, fellow residents thought she was using heroin after Michael Martin (Troy Beckwith) gossiped about her. She had previously been emotionally neglected at boarding school and decides to pretend to be an addict because she loves attention. Danni's condition becomes a problem when she and Malcolm Kennedy (Benjamin McNair) go on holiday. A flood finds them stranded without food or water causing her blood sugar levels to drop. They go out and search for food so that her diabetes does not prove fatal. Danni can be incredibly moody at times and she often leads her brother Brett astray.

Danni is not happy with Cheryl's relationship with Lou Carpenter (Tom Oliver) and she makes her feelings about the subject very clear to her mother. Szonert explained that Danni is "angry at life" and that she has not sorted out her feelings regarding her father's unexpected death. Danni initially does not like Lou interfering in her family's lives, but her relationship with Lou gradually grows better.

In January 1996, Diana Taylor of The Daily Telegraph confirmed that Szonert would be leaving the show. She reported on Szonert's return to Australia from the UK, where she had been appearing in pantomime, in order to film her final episodes. Szonert had decided to leave Neighbours after two and a half years, as she felt it was time to move on and look for new roles. She commented: "I love everyone on the cast and crew. But I'm looking forward to auditioning for different roles and doing acting classes again." She eventually filmed her final scenes in September and completed her last scene in one take. She admitted that it became "a bit much" and she almost broke down and cried. Blewitt also filmed his final scenes at the same time, and Szonert stated "It's really weird because it feels like only yesterday that Brett and I were doing our first scene. But it's great that we could do this together. We came in at the same time and we're leaving together." On-screen, Danni leaves Erinsborough for a job in the fashion industry in Malaysia. Jeff Jenkins of TV Week described her exit as "a tearjerker" as Danni is forced to leave her boyfriend, Luke Handley (Bernard Curry) behind. Her final scenes aired in November 1996. In early 2005, Szonert was asked to return to Neighbours for a guest appearance as part of the show's 20th anniversary. She accepted and was one of many ex-cast members who made an appearance in the episode "Friends for Twenty Years", which was broadcast on 27 July.

== Storylines ==
Danni arrives with Brett, and Cheryl moves in with them. Cheryl initially does not want her children around as she prefers to live the high life after her Lotto win. After seeing Danni inject insulin, Michael Martin spreads a rumour that she is using drugs; she plays along with this for attention. Michael is infuriated with her when she reveals the truth, but she seduces him. Danni begins a relationship with Michael; they also sleep together without contraception on one occasion. Cheryl becomes annoyed with Danni over their relationship, but she continues seeing him in secret regardless of her mother's opinion. In turn Danni makes it clear that she disapproves of Cheryl's relationship with Lou Carpenter, refusing to be happy for her mother's newfound happiness. She and Michael separate and she begins seeing Malcolm for one year. Danni believes she is in love with Mal; they later move in together to prove they are serious about each other. Their relationship crumbles after one year; upon their break-up, she dates Kingston White (Simon Wilton). She later dates Ben Dalziel (Stephen Pease), Steve George (Alex Dimitriades) and Luke Handley (Bernard Curry). Danni is devastated when Cheryl is hit by a car and dies. She emotionally blackmails Luke into starting a new life with her; this along with Darren's wild behaviour against Mal, Lou and Karl makes Brett decide to leave. She later leaves after being offered a job overseas, leaving at the same time as Brett. Nine years later, Danni appears in Annalise Hartman's (Kimberley Davies) documentary about Ramsay Street.

== Reception ==
A writer for the BBC Online said Danni's most notable moment was "Being caught with Michael Martin in Lou and Cheryl's bed." Editor of MSN TV, Lorna Cooper, described the character's storylines as typical, stating: "Danni experienced the typical growing pains of a Ramsay Street female teen (school and boys)." Anthony Cowdy of The Independent called Danni "the nubile enfant terrible of BBC1's Neighbours". Following Danni's expulsion from school, he said "In your adamant refusal to renege on your contracts to protect school bullies and other unsavoury youngsters, you had a quiet dignity that was truly attractive." Rochelle Tubb of The Sun-Herald dubbed the character "havoc-creating". A reporter from Inside Soap criticised the character, stating "When it comes to heeding advice from others, Danni prefers to bury her head in her ego."

Noting Danni's sudden fashion career, Letitia Rowlands from The Daily Telegraph commented "Consume in moderation as a Neighbours overdose can lead to serious self-delusion as you, too, think you can become an award-winning fashion designer in less than a week, just like Danni Stark (Eliza Szonert)." In 2014, writers for All About Soap called for Danni's return to the show for the 30th anniversary. They said "The former wild child would definitely up the glamour stakes if she attended the big bash, and can you imagine how exciting it would be if her first love, Mal Kennedy, was there too? Sparks would be bound to fly!" They also branded Danni "our ultimate style crush".
