= Kym Valentine =

Australian actress

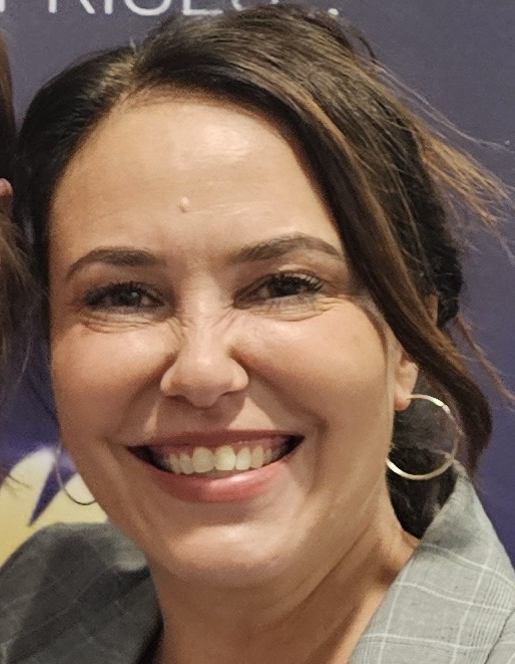
- Valentine at a Neighbours event in 2025.
- Born: Blacktown, Sydney, Australia
- Occupation: Actress
- Years active: 1989–present
- Known for: Neighbours
- Children: 2

Kym Valentine is an Australian actress, known for her long-running intermittent portrayal of Libby Kennedy in the soap opera Neighbours.

== Early life ==
Kym Valentine was born in Blacktown, Sydney, and grew up in Granville. She began dance classes when she was two and attended her first dance school aged six. She studied jazz and ballet for 13 years. When she was five years old, Valentine began acting in television commercials and stage plays. She went to make appearances on Candid Camera on Australia, Swap Shop, documentary Adult Illiteracy and educational program Save Nugget End. She studied dance, singing and drama at the Performing Arts School in Sydney.

== Career ==
Valentine's early television appearances included guests roles in Brides of Christ, and Home and Away. She appeared alongside her future Neighbours co-star Brett Blewitt in the comedy series My Two Wives in 1992.

In 1994, Valentine joined the cast of Neighbours as Libby Kennedy. She was reunited with her My Two Wives co-star Blewitt, whose character Brett Stark develops a crush on Libby. Valentine said that she and Blewitt had to kiss in their previous roles, so she found the situation "really funny", especially as they were such good friends off-screen. Valentine relocated from her home in Sydney to Melbourne for filming when she was 17 years old.

In 2005, Valentine took the lead role of Baby in Dirty Dancing: The Classic Story on Stage at the Theatre Royal, Sydney.

In June 2007, Valentine re-joined Neighbours on a permanent basis. On 8 April 2009, Valentine made an appearance as herself on The Wright Stuff, a UK TV programme.

Valentine appeared as a housewife in Nine Network's miniseries Fat Tony & Co., which was broadcast in 2014. Valentine returned to Neighbours as part of a storyline to celebrate 20 years of the Kennedy family in 2014.

In 2017, Valentine was cast in Michael Wormald's independent film Choir Girl, which was released in 2019. In 2018, she appeared in a Melbourne stage production of Unsolicited Male (which she repeated in 2022). She also starred alongside her daughter in the short film Treetment, which was filmed in Melbourne in December 2018.

Valentine appears as the character Connie the Phlegmatic in the upcoming film titled Residence.

In addition to her stage and screen work, Valentine teaches acting classes.

== Personal life ==
Valentine married singer Fabio Tolli, and they have a daughter. The couple separated in 2007.

Valentine was engaged to former AFL player Trent Croad in March 2015. In November 2015, Valentine and Croad confirmed they were expecting their first child together, and their son was born in March 2016. The relationship ended in December 2017.

=== Health issues ===
On 4 July 2008, Valentine collapsed on a flight home from New York and was diagnosed with pneumonia and pneumothorax. When she arrived in Melbourne she spent several days in hospital before recuperating at home. Valentine was told that she needed to rest for a month and she could not return to work on Neighbours. New Zealand actress Michala Banas took over the role of Libby for a month.

On 6 July 2010, Valentine was hospitalised for four days with a life-threatening blood clot on her lung. In December 2010, Valentine checked herself into a clinic as she was suffering from exhaustion. She returned to the Neighbours set in January 2011. A few months after her return to filming, Valentine took indefinite leave from Neighbours.

== Acting credits ==
=== Film ===
| Year | Title | Role | Notes |
|---|---|---|---|
| 2018 | Treetment | Katrina | Short film |
| 2019 | The Grand Scheme | Clementine | Short film |
| 2019 | Choir Girl | Caroline Doyle | |
| 2022 | Junk Mail | Chey | Short film |
| TBA | Residence | Connie the Phlegmatic | Also producer |

=== Television ===
| Year | Title | Role | Notes |
|---|---|---|---|
| 1991 | Brides of Christ | | Miniseries |
| 1992 | My Two Wives | Lisa Kennedy | 13 episodes |
| 1994 | Home and Away | Belinda | 1 episode |
| 1994–2004; 2007–2011; 2014; 2022 | Neighbours | Libby Kennedy | Series regular |
| 2014 | Fat Tony & Co. | Peg Mancini | Miniseries, 1 episode |
| 2024 | Til You Make It | Siobhan | 1 episode |

=== Stage ===
| Year | Title | Role | Notes |
|---|---|---|---|
| 1996–1997 | Cinderella | Cinderella | Llandudno with Qudos Productions, UK |
| 1998–1999 | Snow White | Snow White | Beck Theatre, Hayes with Qudos Productions, UK |
| 2000–2001 | Cinderella | Cinderella | Hexagon Theatre, Reading with Qudos Productions, UK |
| 2002–2003 | Peter Pan | Peter Pan | Hawth Theatre, Crawley with Qudos Productions, UK |
| 2004–2005 | Dirty Dancing: The Classic Story on Stage | Baby | Theatre Royal, Sydney, Princess Theatre, Melbourne, Burswood Theatre, Perth with Kevin Jacobsen Productions |
| 2015 | The Vagina Monologues | Co-lead | University of Tasmania with Adrian Baum Presents |
| 2018; 2022 | Unsolicited Male | Wendy, the P.A. | Abbotsford Convent, Melbourne, Chapel Off Chapel, Melbourne with Q44 Theatre Company |
