= Eliza Szonert =

Australian actress

- Born: Eliza Szonert; 29 January 1974 (age 52); Victoria, Australia
- Occupation: Actress
- Years active: 1993–present
- Known for: Neighbours

Eliza Szonert is an Australian actress, known for her role as Danni Stark in Neighbours.

== Career ==
Szonert was born on 29 January 1974 in Melbourne, Australia. She acted in a stage production of Cinderella at the Children's Oxford Theatre and appeared in a television commercial for Speeds Shoes. The year after she finished high school, she secured the role of Danni Stark in Australia's long-running soap opera Neighbours from 1993 to 1996. Szonert reprised the role in 2005 for the show's 20th anniversary.

After leaving Neighbours, she relocated to Los Angeles, where she studied acting for two years and took parts in various television series, including Buffy the Vampire Slayer spin-off Angel. Szonert also played Janine Kellerman in the Australian film The Dish in 2000. She had a minor role in Stingers and also acted on stage. Szonert then played Trish Moran on the Australian television show Underbelly in 2008.

== Personal life ==
Whilst in the States, Szonert married American businessman Charles Martens in Laguna Beach, California, and had three daughters.

After divorcing, she moved home to Melbourne, where she started a relationship with Australian businessman Ashley Crick, with whom she has one son.

== Career ==
=== Film ===
Year	Title	Role	Type
2000	The Dish	Janine Kellerman	Feature film
2002	Size Does Matter	Julia	Short film
2002	Power Walk		Short film
2010	Torn	Julie Clay	Feature film
2011	Little Johnny the Movie	Little Johnny's Mum (voice)	Animated TV series

=== Television ===
Year	Title	Role	Type
1993–1996; 2005	Neighbours	Danni Stark	TV series, 239 episodes
2000	Angel	Chambermaid	TV series, 1 episode
2001	Ponderosa	Myra	TV series, 1 episode
2002	The Secret Life of Us	Rebecca	TV series, 1 episode
2003	Stingers	Rene Flynn	TV series, 4 episodes
2008	Underbelly	Trish Moran	TV miniseries, 7 episodes
2010	Lowdown	Clare	TV series, 1 episode
