= List of Neighbours characters introduced in 1990 =

Neighbours is an Australian television soap opera created by Reg Watson. It was first broadcast on 18 March 1985. The following is a list of characters that first appeared in the serial in 1990, by order of first appearance. All characters were introduced by the show's executive producer Don Battye. The sixth season of Neighbours began airing from 11 January 1990. January saw the arrival of the Alessi twins Caroline and Christina Alessi played by Gayle & Gillian Blakeney. Barman Kelvin Stubbs also began appearing that month. In February, Josh Anderson and Ryan McLachlan, played by Jeremy Angerson and Richard Norton, respectively, made their first appearances. That same month British actor Derek Nimmo guested as Lord Ledgerwood. Maggie Dence arrived as new principal Dorothy Burke in March. Bob La Castra joined the serial as Eddie Buckingham in April, and Stephen Hall also joined the cast that month as Boof. Beth Buchanan began playing Gemma Ramsay, the niece of established character Madge Bishop in June. The following months, three more members of the new Willis family arrived, Doug, Pam and Adam, played by Terence Donovan, Sue Jones and Ian Williams, respectively. Alison Whyte guested as environmentalist Amber Martin in September and Richard Huggett arrived as Glen Donnelly.

== Caroline Alessi ==
Caroline Alessi, played by Gillian Blakeney, made her first on-screen appearance on 18 January 1990. Writers devised relationship stories for Caroline alongside the characters Adam Willis (Ian Williams) and Jim Robinson (Alan Dale). A notable storyline for the character was kissing her sister Christina's (Gayle Blakeney) husband Paul Robinson (Stefan Dennis).

== Christina Alessi ==
Christina Alessi, played by Gayle Blakeney, made her first on-screen appearance on 18 January 1990. Christina is the twin sister of Caroline Alessi (Gillian Blakeney). Christina later marries long-standing character A notable storyline for the character occurred when she ran off with her son Andrew Robinson (Shannon Holmes) without informing Paul.

== Kelvin Stubbs ==
Kelvin Stubbs, played by Michael Fletcher made his first on-screen appearance during the episode broadcast on 22 January 1990. Fletcher is a British actor and had appeared in Neighbours four times prior in small "walk on" roles as delivery men. Kelvin is portrayed as a "bashful" and "clumsy" character and Fletcher believed that Kelvin has "bad luck". Producers asked Fletcher if he was clumsy like Kelvin and he insisted he was not. Fletcher told that Stuart Gilles from Manchester Evening News that he had an ironic first day filming because he had a series of clumsy accidents.

Writers paired Kelvin romantically with Melanie Pearson (Lucinda Cowden). Fletcher recalled that writers transformed the character's appearance and persona, which leads to romance with Melanie. Fletcher told Gilles that Kelvin "always fancied" Melanie but believed she would not want a "bashful type" as a romantic partner. Melanie later pursues romance with Kelvin when he changes his appearance. Fletcher revealed that Kelvin becomes "less clumsy" and "transformed into someone "very different" but not "entirely macho". He revealed that he was required to wear glasses to make him more attractive to Melanie, despite not wearing glasses off-screen. Writers opted for a passionate relationship for the duo, with more intimate scenes being written than were broadcast. Fletcher revealed that he and Cowden changed some intimate scenes they believed were "over the top" because they were always kissing. He described their relationship as problematic because "they keep falling in and out of love". Fletcher described the end of Melanie and Kelvin's relationship as "surprising" and recalled crying when he first read the scripts.

Kelvin is a waiter at Lassiter's. He is revealed as a secret admirer of Melanie and she accuses him of stalking her. She decides to help him gain confidence and they begin to date. Melanie gives Kelvin too much confidence and he asks Christina Alessi (Gayle Blakeney) out to dinner and goes on a date with Andrea (Bridie Carter). Melanie is upset to realise Kelvin has been cheating on her. He made his final appearance as Kelvin on 3 April 1990.

== Josh Anderson ==
Joshua "Josh" Anderson, played by Jeremy Angerson, made his first on-screen appearance during the episode broadcast on 5 February 1990. He arrives in Erinsborough because his father relocates to the area to run a news agents. Producers hired Angerson because they were increasing the size of the male cast following the departure of popular characters. Josh is characterised as friendly, academically bright and good at chemistry. The character helped to form the show's teenage character group of his era alongside Todd Landers (Kristian Schmid), Melissa Jarrett (Jade Amenta) and Cody Willis (Amelia Frid).

== Ryan McLachlan ==
Ryan McLachlan, played by Richard Norton, made his first screen appearance on 15 February 1990. Norton told Chrissie Camp of TV Week that he "couldn't believe his luck" when he received the role of Ryan. He moved to Melbourne aged 19 to begin filming. Ryan is the older brother of Tiffany McLachlan (Amber Kilpatrick) and very protective towards his younger sister. Ryan and Tiffany come to Ramsay Street to stay with their aunt, Dorothy Burke (Maggie Dence). Norton stayed with Neighbours for one year and left to join the cast of rival soap opera Home and Away. Writers devised an exit storyline which saw him leave Erinsborough to join the army.

== Lord Ledgerwood ==
Lord Ledgerwood
- Neighbours character
- Portrayed by: Derek Nimmo
- First appearance: 26 February 1990
- Last appearance: 27 February 1990
- Introduced by: Don Battye

Lord Ledgerwood, played by Derek Nimmo, made his first screen appearance during the episode broadcast on 26 February 1990. The character and Nimmo's casting were announced on 6 December 1989. James Cockington from The Sydney Morning Herald reported that the British actor had joined the cast in a guest role. He filmed on location in Lyme Park, Cheshire in the United Kingdom alongside Anne Charleston and Ian Smith who play Madge Bishop and Harold Bishop respectively. Cockington said the scenes were due to air in February which were billed as two special episodes. Nimmo was interested in appearing in Neighbours when he was approached because he thought it would be a free holiday. But they informed him that filming would take place in his own country. Nimmo told Cockington that he believed the episodes would be well received by Australian viewers because of his character. He branded Lord Ledgerwood a "archetypal silly Pom" which in his opinion Australians like. The character has been described as an "eccentric peer". Rosemary Daniels (Joy Chambers) also featured in his storyline.

Madge and Harold walk around Lyme Park in England where they see Rosemary. She thinks she will need to fly back to the US and asks Madge and Harold to find Lord Ledgerwood and secure her business deal. They visit his estate but he refuses to see them. Rosemary arrives having not left after all. Lord Ledgerwood agrees to see Rosemary and he shows everyone around. The character's final appearance was screened on 27 February 1990.

== Dorothy Burke ==
Dorothy Burke (previously McLachlan), played by Maggie Dence, made her first on-screen appearance on 7 March 1990. The actress was appearing in a theatre production when she was approached by a representative from Grundy to join the show. Dorothy's storylines were written to include a mixture of comedy and drama. Dorothy lived on Ramsay Street alongside her niece Tiffany (Amber Kilpatrick) and nephew Ryan McLachlan (Richard Norton). In 1993, Dorothy meets Tom Merrick (Robert Essex), a school inspector who comes to evaluate Erinsborough High and they fall in love. This leads to her departure alongside Tom.

== Eddie Buckingham ==
Edward "Eddie" Buckingham, played by Bob La Castra, made his first screen appearance during the episode broadcast on 2 April 1990. La Castra created the character for himself after he was told that casting him the soap would be difficult because of his ethnic background. He auditioned for Neighbours via video tape. La Castra was written out of Neighbours in October 1990 along with a series of characters, so the producers could make a return to focusing on family-oriented drama. Eddie departed on 28 September 1990.

== Boof ==
Boof
- Neighbours character
- Portrayed by: Stephen Hall
- Duration: 1990, 1992–1993
- First appearance: 19 April 1990
- Last appearance: 11 March 1993
- Introduced by: Don Battye (1990, 1992); Alan Coleman (1993)
In-universe information
- Other names: Gary Head
- Occupation: Student

Gary "Boof" Head, played by Stephen Hall, made his first screen appearance during the episode broadcast on 19 April 1990. Caron Eastgate from TV Week reported that Boof would be responsible for the breakdown of Todd Landers (Kristian Schmid) and Melissa Jarrett's (Jade Amenta) relationship. Melissa's mother would ban her from seeing Tood after Boof convinces him to break-in a local car crushing office. The two characters burgle the office and take spare parts to repair their bikes with. Hall had guested on the serial the previous year as Angus Owens.

Boof is introduced during a bike race alongside established characters Todd, Melissa, Ryan McLachlan (Richard Norton), Josh Anderson (Jeremy Angerson) and Cody Willis (Amelia Frid). He purposely knocks Cody off her bike and she injures her knee. He then teases Ryan about Cody. The race upsets local pensioner Lester Cooper (Roy Baldwin) who tells them off and orders them away from his land. Boof begins to threaten Lester and pushes him over. Ryan stands up to Boof for bullying a pensioner. Kerry Bishop (Linda Hartley-Clark) becomes annoyed at Boof for vandalising the park and shouts at him.

Boof gets his friends to hang around Ryan's work. They begin to smash plates and threaten to beat Ryan up. Boof begins spending time with Todd and gets him to break in the local car crushing office. They are caught, arrested and given a court date. Boof is later sent to juvenile detention and Todd is free to leave after being given a given a good behaviour bond. Boof later threatens Todd with a piece of wood but Josh comes to help him. When Boof does not back down, Josh beats him up. Boof later hassles Melissa and Cody but runs off when Josh appears.

Two years later, Boof returns to Erinsborough and begins bullying Toby Mangel (Ben Guerens) into stealing for him after Toby witnesses him stealing the money for World Vision from the Coffee shop. Boof threatens to hurt Toby's dog Bouncer and kidnaps him as leverage, holding him hostage in a metal shed at a scrapyard. He also begins hassling Rick Alessi (Dan Falzon), who is initially blamed for a spate of thefts in the street and bullies him into stealing too, but Rick and his brother, Marco (Felice Arena) come up with a plan to foil Boof. After Marco secretly rescues Bouncer from the scrapyard, Rick and Toby bring Cameron Hudson's (Benjamin Grant Mitchell) motorbike to Boof. When Boof goes to the shed to retrieve Bouncer, Marco pushes him inside with another dog, Fang. Marco agrees to let Boof out if he agrees to sign a confession. Boof initially refuses but when relents when Marco is prepared to let Fang off the leash and signs. Boof is then arrested and sent back to prison.

Several months later, Boof reappears as a member of "The Peace Patrol", a Neighbourhood watch group. He appears to foil a robbery but it is later discovered that he and another group member, Clay (Russell Frost), staged the whole thing in order to get publicity in the paper from Cameron, who is a journalist.

== Gemma Ramsay ==
Gemma Ramsay, played by Beth Buchanan, made her first on-screen appearance on 20 June 1990. In March 1990, a Neighbours publicist confirmed that producers were negotiating with Buchanan to join the show. She was signed to a six-month contract and told it could be extended. Gemma arrives in Erinsborough to live with Madge Bishop (Anne Charleston) following the death of her mother. Gemma is characterised as "care free and independent" but is more interested in having a good time rather than studying. But she is intelligent and cable of achieving more than she does.

== Doug Willis ==
Douglas "Doug" Willis, played by Terence Donovan, made his first screen appearance during the episode broadcast on 18 July 1990. Following a short stint in rival Australian soap opera, Home and Away, playing Al Simpson, the alcoholic father of Rebekah Elmaloglou's character, Sophie, Terence Donovan would now play her [eventual] father-in-law in Neighbours, starting in 1990. He was cast in the role of Doug Willis, the patriarch of the newly introduced Willis family and husband to Pam (Sue Jones). The family aspect was one of the main reasons Donovan accepted the part. The character has been used to portray the effects of depression and Alzheimer's disease. Rebekah Elmaloglou's Neighbours character, Doug's daughter in law, Therese Willis, was introduced in 2013, and shared screentime with Doug, before he was killed off in 2016.

== Pam Willis ==
Pamela "Pam" Willis (previously Beresford), played by Sue Jones, made her first screen appearance during the episode broadcast on 6 August 1990. Jones carried out a screen-test for the show and was offered the part. Trained as a nurse, Pam arrives as a full-time mother to her four children: Adam (Ian Williams), Gaby (Rachel Blakely), Brad (Scott Michaelson) and Cody (Amelia Frid). She is married to Doug Willis (Terence Donovan). A notable storyline for the character saw Pam accused of murdering her patient, Garth Kirby (Roy Baldwin).

== Adam Willis ==
Adam Willis, played by Ian Williams, made his first appearance on 9 August 1990. Williams was signed up to appear in the show in early 1990 but did not know exact details about his character. In April that year writers were still working on stories for the character. Williams was filming a role in Bony, another Grundy production. He was scheduled to begin filming in June once that Bony had finished production. Williams said the part appealed to him as it was flexible and Adam's humour kept him "fired up." Williams explained that he felt similar to his character as they both loved their families, but he was not impressed with Adam's naivety. Writers devised romance storylines for the character involving Caroline Alessi (Gillian Blakeney) and Gemma Ramsay (Beth Buchanan).

== Amber Martin ==
Amber Martin
- Neighbours character
- Portrayed by: Alison Whyte
- First appearance: 27 August 1990
- Last appearance: 11 September 1990
- Introduced by: Don Battye
In-universe information
- Occupation: Environmental activist

Amber Martin, played by Alison Whyte, made her first on-screen appearance in the episode broadcast 27 August 1990. Amber is an environmental activist who arrives in Erinsborough to visit her lifelong best friend of Kerry Bishop (Linda Hartley-Clark). Amber was introduced as part of Hartley-Clark's departure from the series. Amber's arrival makes Kerry realise how much her life has changed since she married Joe Mangel (Mark Little). Hartley-Clark told Chrissie Camp from TV Week that "when Amber comes back into Kerry's life, Kerry realises how domestic she has become and she's determined to be more active in marches and protests." She added that Joe is against her involvement but Amber makes her realise that she needs more than to stay at home raising her family. Amber learns that there is a duck hunting session being held in marshlands and asks Kerry to join her and form a protest against the hunters. Joe pleads with Kerry to reconsider but Hartley-Clark explained that her character is "adamant" she must join Amber on the protest. The scenes were filmed outside of Melbourne and the actors were forced to contend with slime, frogs and spiders during the location shoot. The protest ends in tragedy for Kerry as a hunter shoots and kills her.

Amber arrives to see Kerry and they remember old times when Kerry was more involved in activism for wildlife. Amber later makes her realise that she has become uninvolved with protesting, forcing her to evaluate her stance. Amber decides to show Joe's son Toby (Ben Geurens) pictures of dead animals to try and show him the reality of the meat industry. Kerry and Joe are shocked and forbid her to involve Toby in activism. Amber learns that duck hunting season is beginning on marshlands and invites Kerry to protest at the area. When they arrive they find injured birds which upsets Kerry and she confronts a group of hunters. Kerry is shot and killed and Joe blames Amber for Kerry's death and throws her out of the house and bars her from Kerry's funeral. However, Amber arrives and Joe tries to stop her from giving her eulogy but Matt Robinson (Ashley Paske) prevents him from doing so. Amber tells everyone that Kerry was lucky to find love with Joe even if only for a short while. Amber leaves Erinsborough after the funeral.

== Glen Donnelly ==
Glen Donnelly, played by Richard Huggett, made his first on-screen appearance on 7 December 1990. Huggett joined Neighbours after completing a regular role on rival soap opera E Street. Glen is characterised as "independent, tough and mature beyond his twenty years". Glen's most notable storyline was his incestuous relationship with his half-sister Lucy (Melissa Bell). This was Neighbours' first incest storyline.

== Others ==
Date(s)	Character	Actor	Circumstances
26 January	Rick	Paul Cannon	Rick begins dating Sharon Davies, but Sharon's sister, Bronwyn tells them off for kissing as they have only known each other for a few days.
26 January	Julie Cabot	Roberta Connelly	Julie is a social worker who arrives to take Rhys Turner into care.
1 February 1990–16 April 1991	Alan Stewart	James Patrick	Alan is a detective who arrives to arrest Joe Mangel when Christina Alessi mistakes him for a crook lurking outside her home. Alan is last seen when he tries to save Christina after she is kidnapped by Phil Hoffman.
8–9 February	Barry Dwyer	Chris Waters	Hilary Robinson spots Barry in the Coffee Shop and discovers he is staying at Lassister's. She tells Matt Robinson that Barry is his father. Matt goes to introduce himself to Barry, who admits he had no idea Hilary had a baby. He gives Matt his number in case he ever wants to make further contact.
8 February	Lisa	Jodie Wright	Lisa is a school friend of Sharon Davies, who shuns her and brands her as "Shaz the Slut" when Sharon is seen to be dating a different a guy every night.
12 February	Karl	Uncredited	Sharon Davies asks Karl to take her to a party. He calls her a slut and she throws him out of her home.
15 February–29 May	Natasha Kovac	Courtney Compagnino	Natasha is a classmate of Tiffany McLachlan. When Kerry Bishop looks after both of them after school, it is clear the pair do not get along. The pair later argue over their parts of the good and bad witch in their school production of Wizard of Oz.
5 March	Cliff	Simon Mills	Cliff sells Todd Landers his trailbike.
22 March–3 August	Tania Walsh	Angela Nicholls	Tania arrives as a friend of Sharon Davies and she begins a relationship with Ryan McLachlan. Tania is unhappy that her father Roger has a new fiancée Melanie Pearson. Tania does not like Melanie and her personality annoys her. She makes remarks about Melanie and compares her to her late mother. But Tania eventually tells Roger that she is okay with his impending marriage. Melanie believes Tania will never accept her and calls off the wedding.
22 March–25 May	Ewan O'Brien	Peter Sumner	An old friend of Beverly Marshall who visits her in Erinsborough. Beverley's husband Jim Robinson is suspicious of Ewan as he had previously boasted about liking an old friend. This causes arguments between Beverley and Jim. Beverley looks back on old letters she exchanged with Ewan. Beverley and Jim have marriage counselling and split up. Ewan asks Beverley to marry him, but she turns him down because she is pregnant with Jim's child.
22 March	Keith	Paul Flaherty	Keith and his friend Ewan O'Brien discuss Beverly Marshall and her husband overhears.
3 April	Andrea	Bridie Carter	A girl who Kelvin Stubbs stands Melanie Pearson up for. Andrea returns Kelvin's watch, which he left at her place the previous evening. Their exchange is seen by Melanie and Kelvin tells her that Andrea is just a customer of Lassiter's brasserie. However, Melanie works out that Kelvin has been seeing Andrea and dumps him.
18–20 April	Lester Cooper	Roy Baldwin	Lester is upset that Boof and his friends have had a bike race in the national park. Boof threatens and pushes Lester over but Ryan McLachlan comes to his rescue. Lester later sets up a tripwire on the land against Kerry Bishop's warnings after a teenage boy was recently killed due to use of the same tactic. During a race, Todd Landers hits the wire and falls off his bike, injuring his leg.
30 April–28 August	Mr. Denning	Paul Dawber	Mr. Denning is a teacher at Erinsborough High. He welcomes Dorothy Burke and shows her around the school when she begins her tenure as principal. Denning accuses Todd Landers of hitting Debbie Langford when it was actually Cody Willis.
11–18 May	Nurse Radcliffe	Traci Hannigan	Nurse Radcliffe shows Helen Daniels to Derek Wilcox's room. The following week, Helen asks her how long Derek will be in hospital for and Radcliffe tells her Derek's prognosis is not good.
11 May–7 July	Derek Wilcox	John Frawley	Helen Daniels goes to visit Derek and shows him her art work. They spend time together and Helen takes him out for a walk. Derek suffers a heart attack and dies.
11 May	Dawn	Lynda Gibson	Dawn is from a women's refuge. She and her friend Rowena go to see Kerry Bishop to talk about the issues. Rowena tells Kerry about her story of escaping from an abusive relationship. When Dawn sees Kerry's father, Harold, she argues with him because his Christian group tried to close the refuge down.
11 May	Rowena	Bernadette Doyle	Dawn is from a women's refuge. She and her friend Rowena go to see Kerry Bishop to talk about the issues. Rowena tells Kerry about her story of escaping from an abusive relationship. When Dawn sees Kerry's father, Harold, she argues with him because his Christian group tried to close the refuge down.
16–18 May	Quentin Becker	Paul Smyth	Quentin is a marriage guidance counsellor who Jim Robinson and Beverly Marshall visit to discuss their faltering marriage.
29 May–12 July	Diane Beaumont	Jennifer Robinson	Diane is Derek Wilcox's daughter and she takes a dislike to Derek's new friend Helen Daniels. Derek sets up a trust fund for artists and Diane accuses Helen of taking her inheritance. Helen takes Derek out for a walk and he dies from a heart attack. Diane blames Helen for her father's death.
14 May	Mr Vasiliou	Vince D'Amico	Mr Vasiliou offers Caroline Alessi a job at Parkside Pacific and she refuses. He later approaches Caroline's sister Christina, believing she is Caroline to offer the job once again. Christina decides to accept the job and pretends she is Caroline.
14 May	Leonie	Fiona Kent	Leonie, Janelle, Babs and Thommo are friends of Melanie Pearson, who go to her home to practise their dancing.
14 May	Janelle	Traci Morley	Leonie, Janelle, Babs and Thommo are friends of Melanie Pearson, who go to her home to practise their dancing.
14 May	Babs	KellyAnne	Leonie, Janelle, Babs and Thommo are friends of Melanie Pearson, who go to her home to practise their dancing.
14 May	Thommo	Tony Di Dio	Leonie, Janelle, Babs and Thommo are friends of Melanie Pearson, who go to her home to practise their dancing.
18–21 May	Constable Wiler	John Stapleton	Wiler arrests Boof for breaking into the local wreckers yard and questions his accomplice Todd Landers.
31 May–22 June	Candice Hopkins	Rachel Bacon	Candice is hired by Paul Robinson to work at his firm. Matt Robinson and Des Clarke both try to date her. Paul feels that Candice is not good at PR work and fires her.
6 June	Phillip Arnel	Geoff O'Connell	Matt Robinson brings Phillip and his wife Jenny, who is in labour into the reception area of Lassiter's. Christina Alessi goes to get doctor Beverly Marshall to help deliver the baby. Jenny gives birth to a girl, and she and Phillip name her Nicole and they thank Beverley.
6 June	Jenny Arnel	Gina Mendoza	Matt Robinson brings Phillip and his wife Jenny, who is in labour into the reception area of Lassiter's. Christina Alessi goes to get doctor Beverly Marshall to help deliver the baby. Jenny gives birth to a girl, and she and Phillip name her Nicole and they thank Beverley.
6 June	Nicole Arnel	Uncredited	Matt Robinson brings Phillip and his wife Jenny, who is in labour into the reception area of Lassiter's. Christina Alessi goes to get doctor Beverly Marshall to help deliver the baby. Jenny gives birth to a girl, and she and Phillip name her Nicole and they thank Beverley.
8 June 1990–21 November 1991	Felicity Brent	Rona McLeod	Felicity is a local councillor who Madge Bishop meets when she elected. During a meeting at Number 24, Felicity annoys Madge's neighbour Beverly Marshall by mentioning her nephew Todd Landers' recent run-ins with the law. At the end of the evening, one of Felicity's discarded cigarettes causes a fire. Felicity causes further problems when she tries to impede a retirement village project Doug Willis and Paul Robinson are working on, but her plans are thwarted. She makes her last appearance when she and her nephew Kirk Mansfield con Paul in a business deal.
11–12 June	Ken	Ian Sprake	Ken is a security guard at Lassiter's. Paul calls on him to investigate the graffiti going on around the complex. When Ken sees a light on in the office, he thinks there are vandals but finds Josh Anderson and Christina Alessi.
13 June	Neil	David Legge	Neil is a salesman who competes with Kerry Bishop to sell more items at the market.
15 June–22 August	Rosie		Clarrie McLachlan's Border Collie, who accompanies him during his trip to Erinsborough. Rosie bonds with Toby Mangel's Labrador Bouncer and they become inseparable. Bouncer and Rosie hang around a building site and befriend the workmen. When Bouncer falls into a deep hole, Rosie begins barking at the workmen but they drive away. She returns home, but her barking is dismissed as overexcitement, so she goes back to the site to be with Bouncer and is caught by a dog catcher. Joe Mangel and Kerry Bishop find Rosie at the pound while looking for Bouncer and upon learning where she was found, they all go to the building site where they rescue Bouncer. The dogs are kept apart, but they pine for one another and the Mangels soon reunite them. Days later, Rosie leaves with Clarrie, after Toby brings Bouncer over to say goodbye.
18 June–22 August	Clarrie McLachlan	Frederick Parslow	Clarrie is a retired professor and the father of Dorothy Burke. She accuses Clarrie of not caring and bribing his grandchildren Ryan and Lochy with presents, but not bothering to visit them often enough. He develops an attraction to Helen Daniels and asks her out on a date. She refuses, but later finds him drunk and tries to support him. He argues with Dorothy and accuses her of not caring about him once her mother, Stella died. She tells him that she became distant so she did not upset him. He admits he developed a drinking problem. Dorothy realises that she and her father are too alike and they make peace with one another. He decides to leave, she asks him to stay, but Clarrie feels that they will get along better once they have had time apart.
25 June–2 July	Tracey Dawson	Emily Mortimore	Tracey arrives in Erinsborough following the death of her mother, Sonia. She is adopted by Rosemary Daniels at the request of her mother. She spends time in Ramsay Street with Rosemary before she takes her to live in the US.
4 July	Steve	Martin Heller	Madge Bishop cycles around with a portable food bike and serves Steve food.
4 July	Pat	Jack Mobbs	Pat is a builder who feeds Bouncer the dog at a building site before Bouncer falls down a hole.
5 July	Bullett	Paul Baiguerra	Bullett joins Sean Jarrett, Josh Anderson and Todd Landers on a bike ride.
11 July–3 August	Roger Walsh	Gregory Ross	Roger is introduced as a love interest for Melanie Pearson. They meet on a cruise and become engaged. Melanie's friends are concerned because he is older than her. They ignore their opposition and work on their relationship. But Roger's daughter Tania, arrives and takes a dislike towards Melanie. Tania makes snide remarks about Melanie in relation to her late mother. She refuses to accept the pair, but over time she notices that Melanie is genuine. Tania gives Roger her blessing but Melanie calls the wedding off because she believes Tania will never accept her.
13–18 July	Whacker	Paul Glen	Whacker is a friend of Joe Mangel, who asks him for the money he owes for gardening supplies. Joe tells him he will pay him back when he wins the darts the competition hosted at the pub. Joe falters at first when he begins trailing but when his son, Toby brings his lucky darts to the pub, Joe is able to score a bullseye to win and pay Whacker.
23 July–15 August	Annabelle Deacon	Amanda Douge	Annabelle is a student at Erinsborough High and Ryan McLachlan tries to impress her by buying her gifts. He steals money from his aunt, Dorothy Burke and when he gets into trouble he tells Annabelle he can no longer afford to impress her.
25 July	Heather Barrett	Suzanne Brenchley	Heather is a play centre worker who meets with Kerry Bishop and Joe Mangel when they decide to enrol their daughter Sky.
2 August	Debbie Langford	Jackie Hardy	Debbie telephones Todd Landers asking him to help with her idea for the school council. Todd's girlfriend Cody Willis believes that Debbie is trying to steal him from her. She attacks Debbie and Todd gets blamed by Mr. Denning.
13 August	Karen Hollis	Margaret Kenno	Karen brings her daughter Emily to the hospital. She has a bruise on her leg and Beverly Marshall confronts Karen and she tells Beverley she does not know what it is like to be a mother. Beverley slaps Karen and she reports Beverley to the police. However, Karen later drops the charges.
14 August	Sam	Bob Stevens	Sam and Barry attend the same Alcoholics Anonymous meeting as Clarrie McLachlan and his guest Helen Daniels.
14 August	Barry	Donald Hirst	Sam and Barry attend the same Alcoholics Anonymous meeting as Clarrie McLachlan and his guest Helen Daniels.
4 September	Debbie Norton	Michelle McClatchy	Gemma Ramsay sees her boyfriend Matt Robinson talking to Debbie. Ryan McLachlan starts teasing Gemma to make her insecure, revealing that Debbie is looking for romance as she just broke up with her boyfriend.
6 September 1990–15 February 1991	Eric Jensen	John Ley	Eric is the biological father of Sky Mangel, who visits his daughter for the first time following an invite from Kerry Bishop. Following Kerry's death and funeral, Sky's adoptive father Joe Mangel is upset that Eric has visited again, but he begins to think he is a genuine man. Joe eventually lets Eric take Sky on the condition he can carry on visiting. But Eric's wife Sandy becomes annoyed with Sky and wants Eric to move to New Zealand without Sky. Eric tells Joe he cannot lose Sandy and tells Joe he can be Sky's legal guardian and returns her home.
7 September	Michael	Richard Fitzgerald	Michael and Megan accompany Kerry Bishop, Amber Martin and Joe Mangel on a protest against illegal duck poaching on the wetlands.
7 September	Megan	Christine Satchell	Michael and Megan accompany Kerry Bishop, Amber Martin and Joe Mangel on a protest against illegal duck poaching on the wetlands.
7–19 September 1990, 4–6 April 2004	John Swan	Brett Swain; David Murray	John is shooting ducks on marshland where Kerry Bishop and Amber Martin are protesting. He is shooting at the time Kerry is hit by a bullet and she dies. Linda Hartley-Clark told Chrissie Camp from TV Week that Swain was her real life friend and she was surprised when he turned up for filming the scenes. She described the character as the "loud-mouth" of the poachers who are at the protest. The actress added that no one sees who shoots Kerry, but she believed it was him because he was the most vocal. John later arrives to apologise to Kerry's father, Harold but is attacked in the process. Fourteen years later, John resurfaces with his son Ryan and Kerry's daughter, Sky Mangel recognises him. Sky follows John to the lake and attacks him calling him a murderer. Sky's uncle David restrains Sky. John explains that he has never fired a gun since Kerry died and returns to the lake every year to reflect on what happened, having given up hunting.
10 September	Doctor Byrnes	Geoff Baird	Doctor Byrnes tells the Bishop family that Kerry Bishop has died.
13 September–12 November	Isabella Lopez	Mich White	Isabella is the fiancée of Paul Robinson. Paul meets Isabella while in Argentina and she returns to Australia with him. He announces his intention of marrying her, which annoys Christina Alessi who is in love with him. Isabella is very attentive to Paul, but constantly reminds him that her family are living in poverty back at home. Her behaviour becomes suspicious and Christina learns that Isabella tried to move her family to Australia, but her application has been rejected. When confronted Isabella turns Paul against his family claiming they are trying to destroy his happiness. Paul's family find evidence that Isabella has lied about her family's working situation. He orders her to leave and she insults him and claims she was only ever interested in using him.
3 October–26 November	John Brice	Terry McDermott	Dorothy Burke meets John through a dating agency. They arrange to meet at a restaurant but another man named John, from the same agency arrives. However, they all agree to have dinner. Dorothy and John Brice go on several more dates together and he proposes, but Dorothy rejects him due to still being married to her estranged husband, Colin.
3 October	John A	Lloyd Cunningham	John A meets Dorothy Burke through a dating agency. On their date, there is confusion when John Brice arrives at the restaurant, but they all agree to dine together. The two Johns have a civilized discussion about art.
5 October 1990–19 March 1991	Aidan Devlin	Blake Collins	Aidan arrives from Brisbane to visit his girlfriend Gemma Ramsay. He is unaware that she is now dating Matt Robinson. He announces his intentions to stay, which upsets Matt. Melanie Pearson tells Aiden the truth and he leaves Erinsborough. He later returns and Matt believes that he is trying to steal Gemma from him. Annoyed with him, Matt punches Aiden and later accuses Gemma of playing games.
22 October–5 December	Sandy Jensen	Donna Woodhouse	Sandy is married to Eric Jensen. She is present when Eric applies for custody of his daughter Sky Mangel. The Jensens are successful in securing custody, but Sky is unhappy living with them and her adoptive father, Joe snatches her and goes on the run. Joe realises he has to return Sky, but shortly after he does, Eric relinquishes custody after Sandy gives him an ultimatum; her or Sky. The Jensens then move to New Zealand.
30 October	Lynn	Olivia Penniston-Bird	Lynn, Bianca and Jessie are school friends of Cody Willis and Melissa Jarrett. They attend a slumber party at Cody's home in Ramsay Street. Bianca spots a figure in the dark outside the house and tells the others but they do not believe her and send her outside as they think she is tying to get out of a Truth or Dare question. Bianca comes face to face with the figure and screams and runs inside prompting the girls to panic. Cody then calls Todd Landers and Josh Anderson, who are responsible for a prank, to check the rooms. When Cody's father, Doug comes home and forgets his keys, he is mistaken for the prowler and arrested.
30 October	Bianca	Kerry Bartlett	
30 October	Jessie	Simone Robertson	
2–5 November	Anthony Reeves	David Wicks	Anthony is a social worker who visits Joe Mangel to check that his adoptive daughter Sky is properly looked after in his care.
6 November	Bob	Steve Lane	Bob is a customer in the pub who talks to Madge Bishop.
7 November	Mick Gilbert	Scott Bowie	When the lights go out in the school printing room, someone kisses Melissa Jarrett. Mick and George both claim to be "the phantom kisser".
7 November	George Muscara	Peter Tzefrios	When the lights go out in the school printing room, someone kisses Melissa Jarrett. Mick and George both claim to be "the phantom kisser".
12 November–5 December	Rory Marsden	Tom Jennings	A friend of Adam Willis. He asks Adam to help find him a job with Helen Daniels's limousine company Home James. Rory is attracted to Caroline Alessi, who is dating Adam and also makes passes at her sister Christina and their friend Melanie Pearson. On a trip to Rory's beach house, the girls conspire to teach Rory a lesson. Melanie seduces Rory and he drops his towel in the darkness only to find Adam, the girls and Paul Robinson in the room surprising him. After returning to Erinsborough, Rory meets a girl named Magella Bentley and fakes being sick in order to meet her. Adam covers for him, but Rory is caught out on a date by Caroline and Magella's father who informs him that Magella is only 16. Rory is then fired, but later rehired.
14 November	Rodney Feldon	Luke Wright	Rodney and Justin are Erinsborough High students. Rodney is initially suspected of being "The Phantom Kisser" by Melissa Jarrett and Cody Willis. Cody tries to get Rodney to get over his shyness. Josh Anderson tells the girls Rodney was with him in the darkroom when the kisser struck. Justin mentions that he had missed cricket practice that day then mentions whispers in Melissa's ear and she confirms to Cody that Justin is in fact the Phantom Kisser.
14 November	Justin Freedman	Justin Morley	Rodney and Justin are Erinsborough High students. Rodney is initially suspected of being "The Phantom Kisser" by Melissa Jarrett and Cody Willis. Cody tries to get Rodney to get over his shyness. Josh Anderson tells the girls Rodney was with him in the darkroom when the kisser struck. Justin mentions that he had missed cricket practice that day then mentions whispers in Melissa's ear and she confirms to Cody that Justin is in fact the Phantom Kisser.
22–23 November	Vera Carmichael	Dawn Klingberg	Harold Bishop hires Vera to work in the Coffee Shop as his new assistant. When Harold hugs Vera, she is uncomfortable and resigns. Her sister, Gwen files a sexual harassment suit on her behalf against Harold. Harold is mortified and threatens to sue for defamation of character if the case goes ahead. Gwen drops the complaint and Vera apologises and asks Harold for her job back and he considers it.
30 November 1990–11 March 1992	Ben Nicolls	Mario Nicolosi	Ben is Toby Mangel's friend. He encourages Toby to shoplift, which he does and is caught. Toby's father Joe bans Toby from seeing Ben, but eventually relents. Ben develops a crush on Lucy Robinson and Toby arranges a "date" with her. Lucy agrees, but comes up with a plan to deter Ben by pretending to be interested in him much to his horror. When Toby and Ben begin high school, they try to join a gang called "The Demons" and need to get a nude picture of a girl. Ben sets up a camera in the bathroom of Number 30 in order to catch Phoebe Bright naked, but she quickly discovers it.
7 December	Dr Morgan	Megan Rees	A doctor who treats Matt Robinson after he falls from his motorbike. She tells him that she had to put stitches in his leg, and that he has a sprained wrist and a slight concussion. He asks after Gemma Ramsay, who was on the back of the bike, and Dr Morgan tells him that she was taken straight to surgery and she will try to find out what is happening for him.
7 December 1990, 25 January 1991	Dr Barclay	David Cotter	Tom Ramsay approaches Dr Barclay to enquire after his daughter Gemma Ramsay, who has just undergone surgery on her leg. Dr Barclay tells him that the operation was difficult, and that Gemma has been taken to intensive care. Dr Barclay later tells Tom that he does not want to alarm Gemma, while she is suffering from shock, but there is a chance she could lose her leg. A few days later, Dr Barclay informs Gemma and her family that she is out of danger and her leg is healing well.
