= Melissa Jarrett =

- Neighbours character
- Portrayed by: Jade Amenta
- Duration: 1989–1991, 2023
- First appearance: 8 August 1989
- Last appearance: 4 December 2023
- Introduced by: Don Battye (1989); Jason Herbison (2023)
In-universe information
- Occupation: Student; Dermatologist
- Father: Ben Jarrett
- Mother: Rona Jarrett
- Brothers: Sean Jarrett
- Husband: Josh Anderson (c. 2003–)
- Daughters: 2

Melissa Jarrett is a fictional character from the Australian television soap opera Neighbours, played by Jade Amenta. Amenta was still at school when she auditioned for and won the role. She was initially contracted for a two-month guest stint. She made her first appearance during the episode broadcast on 8 August 1989. Melissa was introduced as the girlfriend of established character Todd Landers (Kristian Schmid). She formed part of the serial's 1989 teenage character group and was involved in "TV's first love quadrangle". The character departed on 9 April 1991. In 2023, Amenta reprised her role for a guest appearance, which aired on 4 December.

== Casting ==
Amenta was a student at Hoppers Crossing Secondary College when her drama teacher encouraged her to audition for Neighbours. She won the guest role of Melissa ahead of "a long list of hopefuls" when she was just 14 years old. She said "I didn't think I'd get it, but I'm glad I did." Amenta is the daughter of Australian director Pino Amenta. She told Darren Devlyn of TV Week that her father wanted her to concentrate on finishing her education rather than her acting ambitions. The role of Melissa was initially to last for two months and she was introduced as the girlfriend of Todd Landers (Kristian Schmid). Amenta had to balance her school work with her filming schedule.

== Development ==
A writer for the show's official website branded Melissa a "pretty, cheeky, fun and forward" who was confident around other characters. They added "She was fairly popular but managed to hide her epilepsy from her friends well. She had lived in Erinsborough all her life, but not in Ramsay street." The character was part of the show's teenage character group which included herself, Cody Willis (Amelia Frid), Todd Landers (Kristian Schmid) and Josh Anderson (Jeremy Angerson). Melissa's first relationship is with Todd but her disapproving mother bans her from seeing Todd. She is unhappy that he and Gary "Boof" Head (Stephen Hall) were involved in a break-in at the local car crushing office. Their relationship was played out with a series of "ups and downs" over a one-year period. Melissa's romance with Todd "tested" Amenta's acting skills, and she said it was "demanding". She noted that the kissing scenes had been embarrassing for Schmid, but not for her, saying "I don't mind kissing a bit... I am getting paid for it." Schmid said that he had enjoyed playing out his character's second relationship of 1989.

Melissa then dates Josh but reconciles with Todd, leaving Josh "out in the cold". The four characters later became embroiled in a story which was labelled "TV's first love quadrangle". Cody was in relationship with Josh but producers decided that Melissa would romance Josh while Cody would take her place as Todd's love interest. The characters remain secretive about their feelings until the truth is revealed and the new relationships are formed. Frid told Caron Eastgate from TV Week that "it's funny to be swapping partners, but I think it's very cute."

In another storyline shared with Josh, Todd and Cody, Melissa joins them in a game of strip poker. The scene required the males to strip almost naked until they are caught by Helen Daniels (Anne Haddy). In 1991, Angerson told a reporter from TV Hits that he was unhappy with the story. He had previously stripped in scenes but believed an actor's body should be private. Schmid also bemoaned Josh's storyline for being "embarrassing" and "awful", with numerous retakes and a "monotonous" day of filming. Amenta later revealed that it was one of the characters' most memorable scenes. She added that "I didn't realise how iconic that scene had become until I read about it and heard about it afterwards."

One issue led storyline for the character was suffering from the medical condition epilepsy. She manages to keep her illness mostly concealed from other characters. She is responsible with the condition as she is careful about taking her medication. Anthony Hayward wrote in his book The Who's Who of Soap Operas that "because her fits are rare, she remains a confident, outgoing teenager." The character is also at the centre of a storyline involving teacher Mr Gibbs' (Simon Woodward) reputation. A rumour that he is "a pervert" is spread around the school and Melissa is the one who "begins the muckraking". Woodward was given the script one piece at a time, so he was not sure whether his character was guilty or not. Along with Cody and Josh, Melissa subjects Mr Gibbs to a prank that sees him walk into the girls' changing rooms, leading to further rumour and speculation. Woodward was shocked by the effect that "peer group gang warfare" could have on a man's life.

Amenta's departure from the show was confirmed in the April 1991 issue of TV Soap, and a reporter for the publication stated that she would be temporarily halting her acting career. Her character leaves Erinsborough, after saying "a tearful goodbye" to her friends, to move to the United States with her parents.

In 2023, Amenta reprised the role of Melissa and her return was confirmed in October that year. Amenta's return had been leaked online via social media network Facebook, after she was pictured on the Neighbours set at Nunawading studios earlier that year. Melissa's return features her arriving to support a protest against the closure of Erinsborough High, the school she used to attend. Promotional images revealed that Melissa would be interviewed by fellow returning character, Summer Hoyland (Jordy Lucas). Melissa returns during the episode broadcast on 4 December 2023.

Amenta revealed in a backstage video that Melissa's return during a protest suited Melissa's characterisation. She explained that Melissa always had an interest in activism while she was a student at Erinsborough High and "she's still in for the cause". Amenta added that "she's turned up to try and save the school. She's sharing her story. She can't wait to catch up with all the community and reminisce about the times she had with Todd, Cody and Josh." Writers created additional character details to accommodate her return. In her return scenes, Melissa reveals that she has since married her "childhood sweetheart" Josh twenty years prior to returning. Amenta revealed that the pair have two daughters and Melissa now works as a dermatologist.

== Storylines ==
Melissa is first seen when she begins taking piano lessons with Hilary Robinson (Anne Scott-Pendlebury) at Number 30 Ramsay Street. She is immediately smitten with Todd Landers, who lives two doors down from Hilary. Todd is shy at first but admits he likes Melissa and they begin dating. When Todd is caught in Melissa's room one night, her domineering parents, Ben and Rona ban the couple from seeing each other. Melissa and Todd date in secret, but Melissa's brother, Sean (Jamie Churchill), continuously plots to split Melissa and Todd up. Eventually the Jarretts relent when Todd's aunt Beverly Marshall (Shaunna O'Grady) and her husband Jim Robinson (Alan Dale) convince them that Todd is not a bad boy.

At the end of 1989, The Jarretts leave for America, putting a strain on Melissa and Todd's relationship. When the Jarretts return, Melissa finds out Todd had kissed classmate Cody while she was away and they break up. Melissa later dates the newly arrived Josh but he realises Melissa still loves Todd and the relationship fizzles out. Soon after, Melissa sets Josh up with Cody but it does not last long when Cody discovers she still has feelings for Todd, and Melissa begins to like Josh the more time they spend together. In the end, Melissa and Josh become a couple as do Todd and Cody.

One afternoon, while being influenced by Todd's criminal friend Boof, the teens begin a drinking session, which immediately proves dangerous for Melissa since she has epilepsy. Luckily, Beverly is on hand to help. Melissa becomes close friends with animal rights activist Kerry Bishop (Linda Hartley-Clark) and is distraught when Kerry is shot and killed protesting against duck hunting. Melissa and Josh then concoct a scheme to expose Lassiter's for using frozen tuna and they sneak into the kitchens and head towards the fridge where they find the tuna but a kitchen hand shuts the door, leaving Josh and Melissa trapped. Josh quickly stops the fan from freezing them but Melissa is in danger due to suffering from epilepsy and not having her medication to hand. The couple are saved but Paul Robinson (Stefan Dennis) is unimpressed with the damaged fridge and demands payment for repairs.

When Melissa hears rumours of new teacher Mr Gibbs (Woodward) having previously sexually assaulted a girl at his last school, she begins a crusade against him and immediately becomes paranoid that Gibbs is after her. Melissa confides in principal Dorothy Burke (Maggie Dence) that a teacher who looked like Gibbs molested her at her previous school and she was too scared to report him. In the end, Melissa is forced to apologise when Gibbs tells her his side of the story. When Todd, Josh and Cody accidentally cause an explosion in the science lab while trying to brew their own alcohol, Melissa, who is leaving for America with her family, takes the blame so she cannot be punished for it. However, her friends will not allow her to accept the blame and tell Dorothy that Melissa is innocent.

Thirty-two years later, Melissa returns to Erinsborough as part of a protest to save Erinsborough High School. She is interviewed by Summer Hoyland, to whom she reminisces over Cody and Todd, who have both since died. She also reveals that she reunited with Josh over their grief for their friends, and they had been married for the last twenty years.

== Reception ==
In 1991, Barbara Toner of The Sydney Morning Herald said Melissa had the "best entrance on the year's first episode of Neighbours." Toner also bemoaned the scripting of scenes in which Melissa has symptoms of a brain tumour. TV Week's Darren Devlyn said Amenta had "impressed Network Ten with her role as epileptic Melissa Jarrett".

During a feature called "Twelve golden TV sex moments", men's magazine, FHM declared 1991 was Neighbours' finest hour. With Amenta as Melissa, Rachel Friend as Bronwyn Davies and Natalie Imbruglia as Beth Brennan, they said "Good God: that was when being unemployed or permanently bed-ridden really meant something". In 2020, Adam Beresford writing for HuffPost opined that Melissa, Todd, Cody and Josh formed one of the "show's best teen groups". A writer from Carmarthen Journal chose the episode featuring Melissa hiding the damage to Hilary's piano and date with Todd in their pick of the day feature "The Highlights". They added that the date was "all set to end in disaster".
