= Josh Anderson (Neighbours) =

Fictional character from the Australian soap opera Neighbours

- Neighbours character
- Portrayed by: Jeremy Angerson
- Duration: 1990–1992
- First appearance: 5 February 1990
- Last appearance: 14 April 1992
- Introduced by: Don Battye
In-universe information
- Other names: Joshua Anderson
- Occupation: Student; Stripper
- Wife: Melissa Jarrett (c. 2003–)
- Daughters: 2

Josh Anderson is a fictional character from the Australian soap opera Neighbours, played by Jeremy Angerson. He first appeared on-screen in the episode airing on 5 February 1990. He arrives in Erinsborough following his father's relocation to the area. Producers hired Angerson because they were increasing the size of the male cast. Josh is characterised as academically bright and good at chemistry. Angerson has described Josh as "naïve and a bit unpredictable" and "honest". During his tenure Josh helped to form the show's group of teenage characters consisting of himself, Todd Landers (Kristian Schmid), Melissa Jarrett (Jade Amenta) and Cody Willis (Amelia Frid). Other stories included a relationship with Phoebe Bright (Simone Robertson), the issue of temporary blindness and Josh becoming a stripper. The latter storyline challenged Angerson who felt nervous portraying a stripper. He later described filming Josh's stripping scenes as "pretty horrendous" and an "horrific experience".

Angerson finished filming his final scenes in March 1992 and Josh departed the series during the episode broadcast on 14 April 1992. Following his departure, Angerson said he missed the excitement that playing Josh gave him. The character was well received by critics of the genre. Josh's transformation from shy school boy to stripper was praised by Hilary Kingsley from the Daily Mirror. Josh's character development garnered him the label of the show's heart-throb character of the early 1990s.

== Casting ==
When Craig McLachlan quit his role of Henry Ramsay to star in fellow soap opera Home and Away, producers decided to introduce two new characters to help Neighbours recuperate. Jeremy Angerson was cast in the role of Josh, while Richard Norton was selected to play Ryan McLachlan. Angerson and Norton moved in together in a flat share to accommodate filming for the show. When Angerson was fifteen, he worked at the Adelaide Grand Prix selling souvenirs and met a casting director who worked for Neighbours. When Angerson auditioned for the role, the same casting director was responsible for hiring him to play Josh. Describing the process, Angerson told Steve Smith from Fast Forward that "When I was living in Adelaide a talent scout came up about once a year. I didn't hear much about casting in Melbourne for the programme but I got an audition for it and was lucky enough to get the part. It was a complete surprise!" Mark Little who played Joe Mangel took on the role of Angerson's mentor during his time on the show. Angerson was a junior speed-skating champion but had to stop his training for the role because he kept arriving on set with cuts and bruises.

== Development ==
=== Characterisation and relationships ===
The character is introduced into the series following his father's purchase of a local news agents. Of Josh's arrival Angerson told Chrissie Camp of TV Week that "Josh's father own's a newsagents in Erinsborough and he gets friendly with Todd and Melissa. He's a fairly intelligent, but excitable type of character." Josh is characterised as friendly, intelligent and "bright academically" with a keen interest in football and chemistry. He uses the latter to play pranks on people which often leads him into trouble. Writers gave him a best friend in the form of established character Todd Landers (Kristian Schmid) who bonded over mutual interests. Anthony Hayward wrote in his book The who's who of soap operas that "enjoying Todd's popularity with girls, Josh has tried to get advice from him on how to get on with the opposite sex, but he has never managed to attain the same degree of success."

In an Inside Soap feature, Angerson described Josh as "a black sheep and a bit naïve" and thought Todd was the more "heroic" of the two characters. Angerson told Hilary Kingsley from the Daily Mirror that Josh is "a nice person" who is happy at his school. Angerson liked his character, despite him being a "naïve and a bit unpredictable" but ultimately Josh is "honest". He further explained Josh's naivety, stating "he's a bit of a scammer, and doesn't see that there is ever a problem. He never thinks his romances will go wrong. But even when he's hurt he doesn't show it."

Josh was part of the show's teenage group of characters which comprised himself, Todd, Melissa Jarrett (Jade Amenta) and Cody Willis (Amelia Frid). Angerson was the oldest of the four actors and the only one not in school. The characters were involved in a storyline dubbed "TV's first love quadrangle". Josh was in the relationship with Cody, while Todd was with Melissa but producers decided to swap the couple around. When Melissa is banned from seeing Todd, she realises that she is attracted to Josh while Cody hides her feelings for Todd. They all remain unsure of how to tell their respective partners that they have fallen for someone else. Frid told Caron Eastgate from TV Week that "it's funny to be swapping partners, but I think it's very cute." Angerson added that he enjoyed playing his character's romance storylines because he had a good time with his fellow actors. When the truth is outed Josh begins a relationship with Melissa and Cody begins dating Todd. Schmid believed that Josh was not a nice guy.

Writers also created a relationship story with Phoebe Bright (Simone Robertson). Phoebe begins to develop romantic feelings for Josh's best friend Todd. Phoebe decides to write her feelings down on a letter to Todd. Phoebe loses the letter having never intended for Todd to receive it. She is shocked when Josh reveals that he has the letter to Todd without knowing its content. Phoebe rushes to stop Josh and Todd from discovering the truth. Robertson defended Phoebe's deceit while interviewed by a TVTimes reporter, adding that Phoebe falls in love which stops her from behaving sensibly. After they break-up, Josh pursues a relationship with Trish Longley (Susan Ellis).

In 2023, Amenta reprised her role as Melissa. It was revealed that Josh and Melissa had been married for twenty years and have two children together. Amenta added "believe it or not [Melissa] has gone on and married her child hood sweetheart, Josh. So they've got two daughters."

=== Stripping ===
Josh was the first male stripper to feature in Neighbours. Josh originally takes a job as a stripper to raise money and impress his crush, Lucy Robinson (Melissa Bell). Angerson told Kingsley that he understood his character's nervousness, adding "I could never do that sexy dancing for real, no wonder Josh is nervous." In other scenes for the story, Josh wore a Roman soldier costume during his routine. Angerson later recalled a storyline in which Josh performed a strip routine in front of his school principal Dorothy Burke (Maggie Dence), and joked "Everything came off except for my Roman helmet!" He told Kathryn Ellison from Stafford Post the scenes in which Josh strips at a hen party were "pretty horrendous" and a "horrific experience" to film. Angerson was also asked to wear a black sequined G-string, but he refused to comply. He added "I had to do it in front of all the ladies, especially since most of them were about 55 - I kept trying to cover up!"

In 1991, Angerson told a reporter from TV Hits that he would often swear by accident during filming, but added it was always relevant to the scene. Angerson was also unhappy with a storyline in which his character played a game of strip poker. He was required to strip during filming. He had stripped on-screen previously but believed as an actor his body should be private. Schmid also bemoaned Josh's storyline for being "embarrassing" and "awful", with numerous retakes and a "monotonous" day of filming. Amenta later revealed that it was one of the characters' most memorable scenes. She added that "I didn't realise how iconic that scene had become until I read about it and heard about it afterwards." Writers used the character to explore the issue of temporary blindness. Josh is blinded after he uses chemicals to clean his surfboard. Josh soon recovers but pretends to still be blind to for longer to receive more attention from Lucy. Angerson told Sarah Bond from the Daily Mirror that it was a "nasty accident".

=== Departure ===
Angerson was written out of the series during 1992, his departure story featured Josh deciding to leave Erinsborough. It was Angerson's decision to leave Neighbours because he wanted to avoid being typecast in a soap role. He told the Stafford Post's Ellison that it was a "big decision" but felt it was time to move on. He added "I'd spent over two years on the same show and felt anything longer would have been detrimental to my career in terms of casting and maintaining a certain level of energy." Angerson's departure came amidst a "cast shake-up" which saw four actors leave the serial. He filmed his final scenes on 6 March 1992. Following his departure, Angerson told Keith Harrison of the Staffordshire Newsletter that "I do miss the excitement of filming the show and all the build up to that. It gets the adrenalin going and is a good release for all the energy inside me."

== Storylines ==
Josh is first seen in the Coffee Shop on Todd Landers' 16th birthday and they quickly become friends after learning that Josh is new to the area and will be starting Year 10 at Erinsborough High with Todd and they share a common interest- soccer. Todd invites Josh back to his home for his birthday dinner, but when Josh reveals that he asked Melissa out on a date, it doesn't sit well with Todd. Josh realises Melissa still likes Todd and backs off. Josh begins dating Cody Willis, who had previously caused Todd and Melissa problems in their relationship and they begin going out for several months. However, Cody is still attracted to Todd and promptly dumps Josh without explanation. Meanwhile, Josh finds himself becoming more and more attracted to Melissa the more time they spend together studying. The teens soon realise they are all dating the wrong people and agree to swap partners. When Todd falls in with local criminal Gary "Boof" Head (Stephen Hall), Josh tries to make Todd see sense. One evening when Todd is attacked by Boof for informing the police, Josh comes to his friend's aid and subdues Boof with a few kick-boxing moves.

Josh agrees to help Melissa in her scheme to expose Lassiter's for using frozen tuna and they sneak into the kitchens and head towards the fridge where they find the tuna but a kitchen hand shuts the door, leaving Josh and Melissa trapped. Josh quickly stops the fan from freezing them but Melissa is in danger due to suffering from epilepsy and not having her medication to hand. The couple are saved but Paul Robinson (Stefan Dennis) is unimpressed with the damage to the fridge and demands payment for the damages. When Josh begins violin lessons and constantly talks about a woman named Katrina Riley (Jane Conroy), Melissa is quick to accuse him of cheating on her with another girl. Melissa tracks down Katrina and realizes she is much older than Josh and has worried for nothing.

After a runaway truck ploughs into the Andersons' newsagents, Josh and his family are left homeless and jobless with the prospect of having to return to Mildura, which Josh does not really want as he has made friends and is settled in Erinsborough. Jim Robinson (Alan Dale), Todd's uncle agrees to let Josh stay at Number 26 and share a room with Todd. When Josh is subpoenaed to testify against Helen Daniels (Anne Haddy), Jim's mother-in-law, who is suing a hotel after a fall, He is torn between perjuring himself or making Helen look bad on the stand. Under pressure, Josh flees and retreats to his old garage. School principal Dorothy Burke convinces Josh to return to the Robinsons.

Shortly after Melissa and her family move to America, Josh finds himself attracted to Lucy, Todd's cousin, who is home from boarding school. Josh is shocked and appalled when he realises that Lucy is attracted to her new-found half-brother, Glen Donnelly (Richard Huggett). Josh later supports Lucy in the ensuing fallout. Josh continues to woo Lucy by buying her expensive gifts, and even going as far as hacking into Erinsborough High's computer system to change her grades. When Josh owns up to Dorothy about the hacking and takes the rap, Lucy admits she changed the grades herself after Josh backed out and left the computer on. One day while working on a surfboard in the garage, Josh accidentally splashes some acetone in his eyes, rendering him temporarily blind. While out with Todd and Brad Willis (Scott Michaelson) one day, Josh wanders into the road and is narrowly missed by a car. Lucy agrees to help Josh until his sight returns. When it does, Josh doesn't hurry to let anyone know and keeps up the pretence of being blind to enjoy Lucy's affections.

When Josh finds himself short of money, he takes a job as a stripper using a gladiator's costume to disguise him. When one of the bookings is for Helen's hen party, Josh panics at first but then realises no-one will recognise him. At the end of his act, Josh's helmet is removed by Caroline Alessi (Gillian Blakeney) and his identity exposed, leaving him embarrassed. However, Josh's confidence is restored when his friends tell him not to be ashamed of his body. Josh later asks bookish classmate Phoebe on a date, but she is upset when it is revealed that the only reason Josh has done so is because of a bet he lost with Todd and Brad. Josh does fall for Phoebe for real when they are cast in the Year 11 production of Beauty and the Beast. They begin dating but Phoebe's father, Arthur (Barry Hill) disapproves of Josh and warns him off. After Arthur suffers a heart attack, he lets Josh continue seeing his daughter.

After returning home from spending Christmas 1991 in Surfers Paradise with Brad and Lucy, Josh discovers that Todd and Phoebe have fallen in love with each other and he refuses to have anything to do with either of them. Josh dates Phoebe's arch-enemy, Trish Longley to prove that he doesn't care that his feelings are hurt. Trish later plants an exam paper in Phoebe's locker as revenge, which Josh gets the blame for causing more friction between them. However, after a talk with Jim they eventually patch up their differences with Josh before he leaves Erinsborough to return to his parents in Mildura.

In 2023, it is revealed that Josh and Melissa married some 20 years prior.

== Reception ==
To celebrate the 20th anniversary of Neighbours, the BBC asked readers to nominate their 20 favourite obscure characters. Josh came in second place and the readers said "All I can remember is that something happened to cause him to lose his sight and then he tried to pinch Todd's girlfriend". In 2020, Adam Beresford writing for HuffPost opined that Josh, Melissa, Todd and Cody formed one of the "show's best teen groups". Neil Bonner from The Stage believed that Angerson's talents exceeded his Neighbours role as they were "far in excess of his Ramsay Street requirements." In 1993, an article in the Staffordshire Newsletter stated that "Josh-mania" had taken over the town of Stafford in England. Angerson was in the town performing in a pantomime and switched on the town's Christmas light display. David Whetstone from the Newcastle Journal opined that Josh had a "tangled love life" and unlike Josh, Angerson had a "steady girlfriend". Another reporter from the newspaper chose the episode featuring Josh pursuing a relationship with Trish in their "pick of the day" feature.

Hilary Kingsley from the Daily Mirror wrote that during a week that the BBC soap opera Eldorado "failed to sizzle", Neighbours "turned up the heat" with their young characters. Kingsley was referencing stories Angerson filmed in Gold Coast, Australia. She opined that Josh was originally the show's "shy schoolboy", "Todd's quiet friend" and just another "computer-mad kid hanging around with the gang." She assessed that via his stripper storyline, he transformed into "Neighbours' answer to the Chippendales" who was "fighting off hordes of man-hungry women" as he "lost his spots and found his muscles". She added that he became the show's "heart-throb with a sexy image" that Jason Donovan (Scott Robinson) and Craig McLachlan (Henry Ramsay) "never achieved". Writers from the Stafford Post, Sunday Mirror, Leek Post and Times, The Sentinel and the Staffordshire Newsletter branded Angerson a "Neighbours heart-throb". A writer from the Chester Chronicle branded Josh a "Neighbours pin-up".

Kathryn Ellison from Stafford Post branded Josh the "wide-eyed, innocent and cheeky schoolboy we love to hate." Susan Clark from Sunday Mercury criticised Josh and Todd's naked strip poker scenes. She claimed that it was irresponsible of Neighbours to broadcast the scenes because of young viewers. She believed that it was wrong that children learned about strip poker and could watch the scene. She also accused the character of Helen as not taking the "incident at all seriously".
