= Tiffany McLachlan =

- Neighbours character
- Portrayed by: Amber Kilpatrick
- Duration: 1989–1990
- First appearance: 23 October 1989
- Last appearance: 21 June 1990
- Introduced by: Don Battye
In-universe information
- Occupation: Student
- Father: Russell McLachlan
- Mother: Petra McLachlan
- Brothers: Ryan McLachlan
- Grandfathers: Clarrie McLachlan
- Grandmothers: Stella McLachlan
- Aunts: Dorothy Burke

Tiffany "Lochy" McLachlan is a fictional character from the Australian soap opera Neighbours, played by Amber Kilpatrick. She made her first on-screen appearance on 23 October 1989. Tiffany is described as being a little terror and always getting into mischief. She becomes friends with Toby Mangel and manages to get him into trouble too. Tiffany's storylines often saw her tomboyish and mischievous sides come out. She attacks a family of Magpies after being dive bombed by one, she lies to her aunt that Kerry Bishop is mistreating her, she almost drowns after going to the beach and convinces Joe Mangel that he has been cursed. Tiffany departed on 21 June 1990 after deciding to join her parents in Port Moresby, Papua New Guinea.

== Characterisation ==
The BBC called Tiffany "an absolute little terror." They described her as always cooking up mischief and trying to obtain money or vandalise other people's property. They said "this little girl was certainly not made of sugar and spice and all things nice. More like paint-stripper and bleach." Tiffany became friends with Toby Mangel (Finn Greentree-Keane) and through her antics, she managed to get him into trouble. The BBC said that Tiffany's most "audacious moment" was when she graffitied Paul Robinson's (Stefan Dennis) car. Paul was quite protective of his car and was outraged when he saw what Tiffany had done. The BBC wondered what Tiffany was up to today and believed that she was either "Behind bars" or running a bank.

== Storylines ==
Tiffany is the daughter of Russell and Petra McLachlan (Berndardette Wheatley) and sister to Ryan (Richard Norton). As her family were quite affluent, Tiffany appeared to be spoilt and pampered. When Kerry Bishop (Linda Hartley-Clark) begins running a childminding service, Petra places Tiffany in her care. Kerry's stepson, Toby is initially reluctant to become friends with Tiffany, as his friend, Katie Landers (Sally Jensen), had just left for Adelaide. Toby warms to Tiffany after her tomboy persona comes out. She tells Toby to call her Lochy and they become good friends. One day, Lochy and Toby find an empty house and become convinced that it is haunted. However, they discover that a runaway teenager, Lee Maloney (Maree Ackehurst), is living there. They tell Matt Robinson (Ashley Paske) about Lee and he takes her home with him.

After a Magpie dive bombs her, Lochy takes a dislike to the group and begins throwing stones at their nest. Toby and Helen Daniels (Anne Haddy) warn her that she will make the birds angry, but Lochy does not listen. Lochy then decides to climb the tree to get to the nest, but when Kerry calls her, she loses her balance and falls from the tree. She is then left with a broken arm. Lochy clashes with her classmate, Natasha Kovac (Courtney Compagnino), who makes Lochy's life miserable. Lochy tells her aunt, Dorothy (Maggie Dence), that Kerry is mistreating her. Dorothy threatens to report Kerry to the Department of Childcare and Lochy admits that she made her story up. Kerry gives up her child care service, but agrees to continue looking after Lochy.

Lochy's life is placed in danger when she decides to wag school and go to the beach with Ryan and his girlfriend, Tania Walsh (Angela Nicholls). The couple hitch a lift with Kerry's husband Joe Mangel (Mark Little) and Lochy sneaks onto the back of Joe's ute. Ryan and Tania are angry when they find her. Lochy asks Tania to call her school and pretend she is sick. Ryan then tells Lochy to leave them alone, so he and Tania can be alone. Lochy gets into difficulty in the water, having gone out alone and Ryan pulls her to safety. Lochy is unconscious, but some lifeguards give her CPR and she comes around. Lochy tells everyone to blame her for the accident instead of Ryan, but Harold Bishop (Ian Smith) sacks Ryan from the Coffee Shop. Lochy protests outside the shop, outraging Harold. The Erinsborough News turn up and Harold agrees to re-instate Ryan.

Lochy starts having nightmares after witnessing Dorothy knocking down Bouncer. She then contracts the mumps and has to be quarantined. Lochy overhears Dorothy telling Joe that her prized African statue carries a curse if it is ever broken. Lochy breaks the chain around the statue and she runs off. Joe finds the broken chain and believes the curse is real. Lochy tells Dorothy what has happened and Dorothy tells her that she had made the story up. Lochy comes to believe the curse is real though, when a sword falls on Joe. He then begs Dorothy to exorcise the curse and Dorothy has him run outside in his underwear. Lochy admits she broke the chain and asks whether she should go out in her underwear too. Dorothy then admits it was all a joke.

When Toby's mother, Noeline (Lindy McConchie) dies, Lochy is very affected by the news. She goes to get some flowers for her mother, but she falls into a fountain at the park when some of the bricks come loose as she picks roses. Lochy tries to offer Toby some support, but he refuses to talk to anyone. Toby pushes Lochy away one day and manages to hurt her. Kerry and Joe force Toby to apologise and he and Lochy became friends again. When their parents go away to Papua New Guinea, Lochy and Ryan move in with Dorothy. Lochy later joins her parents in Port Moresby, when they decide to settle there permanently.

== Reception ==
The BBC said Tiffany's most notable moment was "Painting Paul's car."
