= Christina Robinson =

Christina Robinson may refer to:

- Christina Robinson (actress) (born 1997), American child actress
- Christina Robinson (Neighbours), fictional character in the Australian soap opera Neighbours

== See also ==
- Christine Robinson (born 1984), water polo player
- Robinson (name)
