= Adam Willis (Neighbours) =

- Neighbours character
- Portrayed by: Ian Williams
- Duration: 1990–1991
- First appearance: 9 August 1990
- Last appearance: 13 September 1991
- Introduced by: Don Battye
In-universe information
- Occupation: Medical student Chauffeur; Labourer; Doctor
- Family: Willis
- Father: Doug Willis
- Mother: Pam Willis
- Brothers: John Willis; Brad Willis
- Sisters: Gaby Willis; Cody Willis
- Wife: Gemma Ramsay
- Daughters: Roxy Willis
- Grandfathers: Bert Willis; Seamus Beresford
- Grandmothers: Moina Beresford
- Aunts: Faye Hudson
- First cousins: Cameron Hudson

Adam Willis is a fictional character from the Australian soap opera Neighbours, played by Ian Williams. He made his first screen appearance during the episode broadcast on 9 August 1990. Williams was cast in the role in early 1990, but did not start filming until June because he had work commitments to another television project. News outlets claimed producers cast Williams to replace former fan-favourite cast members, a claim the actor found insulting.

He is introduced as the eldest child of Doug (Terence Donovan) and Pam Willis (Sue Jones). He is characterised as a studious medical student who does not want to follow his father's example of working on a building site. He is Pam's favourite child and she has high hopes for his medical career. Writers devised romance stories for the character alongside fellow newly introduced characters Caroline Alessi (Gillian Blakeney) and Gemma Ramsay (Beth Buchanan). Williams liked his role in the show but had issues with Adam's naivety.

== Casting ==
Williams was signed up to appear in the show in early 1990 but did not know the exact details about his character. In April that year writers were still working on stories for the character. Williams was filming a role in Bony, another Grundy production. He was scheduled to begin filming in June once Bony had finished production. Dani Rogers from TV Week reported that Williams had been touted in the media as the actor to fill the void left by the departures of Guy Pearce and Craig McLachlan. Williams said that he felt "insulted" to think of such comparisons. He told Rogers that "I'm not anybody's clone. I want to bring some individuality to my role." Darren Devlyn from the same publication reported in July 1990 that Williams' character would bring "drama, romance and heartache to Ramsay Street" when he made his debut during the following month. His introduction would also complete the serial's newest family, following the arrival of his father Doug Willis (Terence Donovan), mother Pam Willis (Sue Jones), and younger sister Cody Willis (Amelia Frid). Neighbours marked Williams' first regular television role, and he felt that it would give him a further understanding of television. He explained "I'm not the sort of guy who will outstay his visit on the show but I look at the character and feel confident he's got a lot of growing to do." He later told James Gibley from Fast Forward that "I joined Neighbours because they wanted a tall, handsome, young man. That's me."

== Development ==
Adam is the eldest son of Doug (Donovan) and Pam Willis (Jones). Anthony Hayward wrote in his book The Who's Who of Soap Operas that Adam was Pam's favourite child because "in her eyes he can do no wrong". Adam grew up in an era where the building trade was suffering a decline. He decided he did not want to live a life of uncertainty and chooses to pursue a career in law. But he found it dull and thus quit and tried out various jobs before leaving for Europe. When he arrives in Erinsborough he is studying medicine and he puts his "heart and soul" into it because he finds it "interesting and challenging". Josephine Monroe, author of Neighbours: The First 10 Years stated that "Adam was bright and it was clear that he would one day flee the nest." Adam was portrayed as the show's naïve medical student. Williams explained that he felt similar to his character as they both loved their families, but he was not impressed with Adam's naivety. Williams told Diana Peters from BIG! magazine that family is important to Adam. He added that "Adam has a more macabre sense of humour than I do."

To help subsidise his living he takes a job as a chauffeur. Williams liked playing a chauffeur and he recalled it created Adam's "funniest" ever Neighbours scenes. Pam soon convinces him to move into the family home. Hayward described an awkward dynamic between Adam and Pam. He stated "she finds it difficult to understand his macabre sense of humour, something he shares with other medical students. To them, it is a means of survival." Pam worked as a nurse and was often anxious over her son completing his studies. She helped him by sharing her own experiences in the profession to discredit any pretensions he had about the career. Adam's relationship with his father differed. Doug is not as supportive towards him than Pam. He doubts his son's ability to finish his studies because he would often quit jobs. Hayward observed that Doug was closest to Brad (Scott Michaelson) because of his basketball skills. Williams said the part appealed to him as it was flexible and Adam's humour kept him "fired up." Williams enjoyed working with Donovan on their character's story because he liked his co-stars energy on-set. Adam appeared in the series at the same time as Amelia Frid, who plays his on-screen sister Cody Willis. Williams told Caroline Westbrook from TV Hits that he missed working with Frid when she left because they had built a brother and sister type relationship off-screen too.

Adam's first romance storyline sees him become the centre of a love triangle involving Caroline Alessi (Gillian Blakeney), Christina Alessi (Gayle Blakeney), and Melanie Pearson (Lucinda Cowden). Williams joked "It's not the sort of thing that's usually a problem for me!" Writers later devised a longer romance storyline for the character involving Caroline. Monroe assessed that there was "a certain disparity between her high-flying income and his student grant" but Adam's "genuine charm and cute looks" attracted Caroline to Adam. Williams told Darren Devlyn (TV Week) that their romance is "certainly not of the storybook variety." Viewers had already been expecting a romance to develop between Caroline and much older character Jim Robinson (Alan Dale). Writers pitched Adam and Jim against one another in a fight for Caroline's affections. Williams explained that their feud leads to a "huge confrontation" which also upsets respected neighbour and his employer Helen Daniels (Anne Haddy). She is not impressed that Adam has caused trouble for her son. Prior to Caroline, Williams believed that the only thing his character took seriously was his medical studies. But he makes every effort to win Caroline's love. But Adam and Jim take completely different approaches to impress her. The actor stated "I love the fact Adam has no pretence. Adam wears his heart on his sleeve, while Jim wears his on his bank balance trying to impress with flashy dinners and flowers." He concluded that he wanted to stay on the show longer because he believed Adam had "a lot of growing to do". Caroline eventually decides to be with Jim rather than Adam.

Writers later paired Adam with Gemma Ramsay (Beth Buchanan). Di Stanley from TV Extra reported that the character would experience problems with Gemma following his condoning of Ryan McLachlan's (Richard Norton) drug use. Stanley revealed that Gemma would pay him a "stormy visit" in retaliation. Adam left the series in 1991, and he was reunited with Gemma in Newcastle. Of their reunion, Monroe wrote "like many other Ramsay Street teenagers, Adam and Gemma confounded the odds by making a go of things." Williams' departure occurred during a revamp of Neighbours following a decline in ratings. Network Ten's executive John Holmes devised the changes; he introduced new characters and helped to write out Adam, Gemma and six other characters. Holmes believed the show had become "tired" and that the cast changes would rejuvenate the show.

Williams wanted to pursue theatre work instead of television. Producers of the rival soap opera Home and Away then offered him a role in their show, which he turned down. He added that he was never a fan of soap operas but was glad he chose to appear in Neighbours. In April 1992, Williams spoke about his departure and told TV Hits' Westbrook that did not regret leaving the role. He also revealed that he felt that appearing in Neighbours took away his privacy off-set. Adam's final episode was broadcast in Australia the night before he debuted on-screen in the United Kingdom. In 2019, it was revealed that Adam and Gemma had married and had a child Roxy Willis (Zima Anderson), who was then introduced into the series.

== Storylines ==
Adam is the eldest child of Doug and Pam Willis. When his parents and his younger sister Cody move to a smaller house in Ramsay Street, Adam opts to move with them as living on his own will be expensive as he is a medical student. The family move into Number 28, and Adam soon takes a job working as a chauffeur for limousine company Home James. Adam meets Caroline Alessi after his interview for the Home James job and asks her out on a date. He later meets her twin sister Christina (Blakeney) and, believing she is Caroline, suggests that they go see a movie. When they all meet up, Adam realises that he has asked out both women thinking they were the same person. They go to see the film together and the twins compete for Adam's attention. After bringing them home, Adam meets Melanie Pearson (Cowden) when she comes over wanting to borrow some blankets. He offers to give Melanie a lift home and she develops a crush on him. After the twins suggest that they just be friends, Melanie persuades Adam to go on a date with her.

Adam soon falls for Caroline but she is involved with Jim. Adam competes with Jim to win Caroline's affections which culminates in Adam injuring Jim during basketball practice, which fails to impress Caroline. After Jim and Caroline break up, Caroline realises she is attracted to Adam and they begin dating. However, Adam's struggle with expenses in his student lifestyle leave him feeling inferior; and as a result he and Caroline split but remain good friends. After struggling at university, Adam decides he wants to give up medicine and drops out to join Doug on his building site. Doug, however is not convinced and engineers a plan to make Adam's time on the site miserable so he will return to medicine. The plan is successful and Adam returns to university to pursue his degree, much to Pam's delight.

Ryan starts taking sedatives and Adam defends him because his university friends take them. This angers Gemma who confronts him. Adam later develops feelings for Gemma who is reluctant to commit to him after her failed relationship with Glen Donnelly (Richard Huggett). She soon realises she has feelings for him too and they begin a relationship. Several months into their romance Gemma receives a job offer in Newcastle at an animal sanctuary and she leaves. Adam follows her one month later and transfers to a university nearby. He completes his studies and becomes a doctor. Adam and Gemma become engaged, marry and later have a daughter, Roxy. When Gemma returns to the street to visit Roxy in 2019, she mentions that she and Adam have separated and in the process of divorce. She later reveals that they have reconciled.

== Reception ==
The BBC said Adam's most notable moment was "Chauffeuring a Lassiter’s client while wearing a toga." During a feature on the show, Anna Pickard from The Guardian tried to choose the characters she would be most starstruck by if she met them. She said "It would have to be the Willis family. All of them. Pam, Doug, Adam, Gaby, Brad and Cody". Adam was named a "soap swot" by an Inside Soap columnist. They said, "Although bright, Adam's career as a student wasn't plain sailing". A writer for Jackie called him "wimpy" while lamenting a lack of "good-looking soap men" in the show. Diana Peters from BIG! magazine opined that Adam filled the show's "mad-cap" and "concerned doctor" role. James Gibley from Fast Forward stated "he's also a bit like that doctor they used to have in Neighbours... that Dr Gibbons fellow." While critiquing the Willis family, Bill Ferguson of the East Kilbride News quipped that Adam was a "sensible guy most of the time, training to be a doctor. They soon got rid of him. Probably adopted."
