= Cornflakes for Tea =

1981 Australian children's TV miniseries

- Starring: Bunny Brooke; Kerry Armstrong; Max Cullen
- Country of origin: Australia
- Original language: English
- No. of episodes: 6

Production
- Producer: Tom Broadbridge

Original release
- Release: 1981 – 1981

Cornflakes for Tea is a 1981 Australian children's miniseries.

== Cast ==
- Bunny Brooke as Mrs Lewis
- Kerry Armstrong as Cheryl
- Max Cullen as Stan
- Howard Kloester as Richard
- Linda Hartley as Trish
- Tamblyn Lord as Chris
- Beverley Dunn
- Bruce Kerr as Forbes Townsend
- Bruce D'Amico as Silvio
- Candy Raymond as Robin Hart
- George Mallaby as Magistrate
- Peggy Nicholls as Mrs Barker
- Jan Friedl as Mrs Fletcher
- Helen Noonan as Concetta
- Bill Rose as Prosecutor

== Story ==
The series is about three children abandoned by parents, who are hiding from authorities so they can reunite with their grandmother.
