= Dorothy Burke =

- Neighbours character
- Portrayed by: Maggie Dence
- Duration: 1990–1993
- First appearance: 7 March 1990
- Last appearance: 3 February 1993
- Created by: Ray Kolle
- Introduced by: Don Battye
In-universe information
- Occupation: Principal of Erinsborough High
- Father: Clarrie McLachlan
- Mother: Stella McLachlan
- Brothers: Russell McLachlan
- Husband: Colin Burke (until 1993)
- Nephews: Ryan McLachlan
- Nieces: Tiffany McLachlan

Dorothy Burke is a fictional character from the Australian television soap opera Neighbours, played by Maggie Dence. The actress accepted the role after being approached by a representative from the show's production company. She made her first appearance during the episode broadcast on 7 March 1990. Dorothy is portrayed as an eccentric. She is well travelled and speaks several languages. She often wears black clothing, which a writer for the official show website said gives her "a witch-like appearance." During her time in the show, Dorothy was the principal of Erinsborough High School. Dence did not have much in common with Dorothy, and a reporter noted that she was barely recognisable out of character, especially without her iconic hairstyle. Dence filmed her final scenes for Neighbours in November 1992. She confirmed that Dorothy would not be killed-off. Her final scenes aired on 3 February 1993, as Dorothy leaves Erinsborough with her love interest Tom Merrick (Robert Essex).

== Casting ==
During an interview with a writer from The Soap Show, Dence revealed the role of Dorothy came along unexpectedly and she had not thought about going into a show like Neighbours again. The actress was appearing in a theatre production when she was approached by a representative from Grundy, the production company behind the show. Dence stated that she was glad she accepted the role and added "It took quite a long time to find my feet but again there were some terrific people to work with. The writers were good to me."

== Development ==
"Many of the neighbours found Dorothy, the Erinsborough High School principal rather prickly. She had severe looks and sharp features and usually wore black, giving her a witch-like appearance. But in truth Dorothy was just a little eccentric. She was well travelled, could speak many languages and clearly had a past that would shock most of her students."

— The official Neighbours website on Dorothy

Dorothy was introduced as the new principal for Erinsborough High School. She arrives in Erinsborough in a "battered old" Volkswagen Beetle. A columnist for TV Soap described the character as "a very well organised and well travelled woman." They also called her a "prudish school marm", with "a mysterious past" who "plays havoc" with her nephew Ryan McLachlan (Richard Norton). Dence told writer Ian Morrison that she played Dorothy with a "school-marmly authority", but she was nothing like her in real life. Dence also had little in common with her character. A Torbay Express and South Devon Echo reporter noted that she is "barely recognisable without the satellite-dish hats and cast-iron hairdo." They also said that Dence was "a lot less formidable" than Dorothy. Dence said that viewers initially expected Dorothy to be a Mrs Mangel type character, which she thought was inevitable. She explained "I think it's one of those things when you go on a very established show, the writers need a period to see what your best bits are and then they pick it up and go with that." Dence said that she was happy with Dorothy's storylines being a mixture of comedy and drama, and she shared some great moments with Sue Jones (Pam Willis), Anne Charleston (Madge Bishop) and Anne Haddy (Helen Daniels). Dence also loved working with the younger cast members when Dorothy took care of their characters.

Dorothy's home was an example of "the character-driven interior". The walls and sideboards were adorned with tribal masks, kilims, terracotta pots, Buddha and Oriental statues. Set designer Scott Bird said the house was designed to "give the impression that she was a classically educated traveller. The artefacts act as flags for the audience, to flesh out the character." Andrew Anastasios of The Age thought the interior decoration was ahead of its time.

The character's estranged husband Colin Burke (Robert Alexander) was introduced in March 1991. Dorothy initially spots a man who looks like her husband at the local pub, but tries to forget the incident. A TV Soap writer said Dorothy "flips" when she learns Madge (Charleston) and Harold Bishop (Ian Smith) are entertaining a Mr Burke at their house. After getting advice from Helen (Haddy), Dorothy "marches" over to the Bishops to learn if the man is her husband. The writer stated "Imagine her shock when she comes face to face with the man she's been trying for year to forget." Colin then sets about trying to "worm his way" back into Dorothy's life. At the same time, Dorothy has to deal with various work problems, including the destruction of the science lab when some of the teen characters try to create a still that explodes.

In October 1992, it was announced that Dence would be leaving Neighbours and would film her final scenes in November. Dence commented on her exit from the serial in December, saying that she "rode off into the sunset". She called it "a nice departure" and confirmed that Dorothy was not being killed off. In early 1993, producers introduced a love interest for the character in the form of Tom Merrick (Robert Essex), a school inspector who comes to evaluate Erinsborough High. Dorothy expects Tom to be old and "stuffy" and he expects her to be a "dope-smoking hippy", but they are both surprised by each other. Dorothy learns Tom is an honest and imaginative man, who uses his free time to have adventures. A writer for Inside Soap said "Like Dorothy, Tom was also a bit of a radical in his student days and it's clear to all the neighbours that these two are soulmates." Dorothy and Tom become good friends and their relationship later turns romantic. Tom announces he is moving to Erinsborough, which causes Dorothy to back off. She tells Helen Daniels that she is scared of a physical relationship with Tom after her mastectomy. Helen encourages Dorothy to tell Tom how she feels and the couple move in together. However, Tom's department transfers him to a rural town and Inside Soap said Dorothy faced a choice of a lifetime. She eventually decides to leave Erinsborough to be with Tom.

== Storylines ==
When Dorothy's mother, Stella, developed Alzheimer's disease, her alcoholic father Clarrie McLachlan (Frederick Parslow) left the family to explore the Outback. After graduating from university, Dorothy began a teaching career. She married accountant Colin Burke (Robert Alexander), but he was later arrested for fraud and jailed. Dorothy let people think she was a widow rather than married to a fraudster. After this ordeal, Dorothy travelled around the world for several years and later returned to Australia.

Dorothy brings her car to Jim Robinson (Alan Dale) to be serviced. Several weeks later, Dorothy moves into Number 30 Ramsay Street and becomes the principal of Erinsborough High, much to her nephew, Ryan McLachlan's (Richard Norton) displeasure. Ryan struggles with having to call her "Mrs Burke" in school and treat her as a teacher rather than family. Dorothy's neighbours initially think she is stuck up at first but she soon forms strong friendships with Jim and his former mother-in-law, Helen Daniels.

Dorothy finds herself in a feud with Kerry Bishop (Linda Hartley) and her husband Joe Mangel (Mark Little) over a boundary dispute and matters are not helped when Dorothy's niece, Tiffany (Amber Kilpatrick) hits another girl, Natasha, for threatening to thump Kerry's toddler daughter Sky, while all are in Kerry's care, leaving Natasha with a black eye. Dorothy assumes Kerry hit Natasha and threatens to report her to the Department of Childcare Services but Tiffany later confesses that she lied, and Natasha's mother confirms it was Tiffany who hit Natasha and not Kerry. Dorothy interferes in their lives again when their dog Bouncer savages a chicken to death, and demands Bouncer be put down.

Dorothy runs for local council against Madge Bishop which causes friction between the two. She wins and is able to prevent the school from closure, but this puts Helen temporarily offside when she refuses a proposal from her to fund an arts programme. Dorothy's father Clarrie reappears in Dorothy's life and it is evident that she has not forgiven him for walking out while her mother was dying and things are uneasy between father and daughter. Dorothy's patience with her father is soon tested when she goes away for the weekend and he lets Ryan hold a party. When it appears that Clarrie has shoved Helen during an argument, Dorothy orders him to leave but soon discovers the truth. Clarrie agrees to attend Alcoholics Anonymous and they part on better terms.

When Ryan finds a letter from Colin, he begins to suspect that his uncle is in jail rather than dead. After being confronted, Dorothy tells Ryan the truth about Colin and swears him to secrecy about his imprisonment. Colin is later released and arrives in Erinsborough, keen to make amends, but Dorothy refuses to hear him out at first. Eventually, she softens and agrees to give him another chance. Dorothy discovers that Colin has been cheating on her with Helen's adoptive daughter, Rosemary (Joy Chambers), and throws him out. Colin pleads for Dorothy's forgiveness, but he is escorted from the street by Jim and Joe. Dorothy discovers a lump in her breast and it is found to be cancerous. Pam Willis, the only person she tells, offers her support. Dorothy interferes in Pam and Doug's marriage, when she helps Pam open a letter from the woman Pam thinks Doug is cheating on her with.

When Joe leaves for England with his new wife, Melanie Pearson (Lucinda Cowden), Dorothy agrees to let his son, Toby (Ben Guerens), live with her. Dorothy also becomes fond of Toby's dog, Bouncer. They are soon joined by Phoebe Bright (Simone Robertson) after her father, Arthur (Barry Hill), dies. Toby and Phoebe both call Dorothy "Mim", a contraction of her middle name, Miriam. After Phoebe falls pregnant to her boyfriend, Todd Landers (Kristian Schmid), and decides to have an abortion, Dorothy supports her. When Todd is killed after being hit by a van while racing to the clinic, Phoebe decides to keep the baby.

Tom Merrick, a school inspector, arrives in Erinsborough and Dorothy is instantly taken with him, but denies her feelings as she is afraid of getting hurt again. After some thought, Dorothy agrees to give the relationship a chance. When she learns Tom will be principal at Toby's new school in the country near where Joe and Melanie have settled, Dorothy agrees to leave with Tom and bids farewell to Erinsborough and leaves Number 30 in the hands of Phoebe and her new husband Stephen Gottlieb (Lochie Daddo).

== Reception ==
A writer for the BBC said Dorothy's most notable moment was "When Dorothy and Jim Robinson got drunk and ended up spending the night together after passing out". A reporter for the Torbay Express and South Devon Echo called Dorothy "Ramsay Street's fearsome headmistress with a heart of gold". Following the character's departure on UK screens, Ben Thompson from The Independent stated: "The void left by feisty head-teacher Dorothy Burke's departure has yet to be filled". Dorothy was placed at number twenty-five on the Huffpost's "35 greatest Neighbours characters of all time" feature. Journalist Adam Beresford described her well travelled and "quite the Renaissance woman" who was "forthright and no nonsense".
