= Gemma Ramsay =

Fictional character from the Australian soap opera Neighbours

- Neighbours character
- Portrayed by: Beth Buchanan
- Duration: 1990–1991, 2019, 2022
- First appearance: 20 June 1990
- Last appearance: 28 April 2022
- Introduced by: Don Battye (1990); Jason Herbison (2019)
In-universe information
- Other names: Gemma Willis
- Occupation: Student; Vet
- Family: Ramsay
- Father: Tom Ramsay
- Mother: Doreen Ramsay
- Sisters: Moira Harrigan
- Husband: Adam Willis
- Daughters: Roxy Willis
- Aunts: Madge Bishop

Gemma Ramsay (also Willis) is a fictional character from the Australian soap opera Neighbours, played by Beth Buchanan. She made her first appearance during the episode broadcast on 20 June 1990. The actress was not sure about a long-term commitment to the serial and initially signed a six-month contract. Buchanan was one of the casting directors top choices to join Neighbours during a cast revamp and efforts to rejuvenate the show during the early 1990s. Gemma was introduced as Madge Bishop's (Anne Charleston) niece. She moves to Erinsborough to live with her aunt, following her mother's death. She is portrayed as intelligent, care free, independent, and someone who will stand up for her friends.

Writers soon established a relationship between Gemma and Matt Robinson (Ashley Paske). Their relationship was problematic following an accident in which Gemma nearly had her leg amputated and the rift with Gemma's father Tom Ramsay (Gary Files), who disapproved of their romance. Gemma's ex-boyfriend Aidan Devlin (Blake Collins) was soon introduced, which ruined her relationship with Matt. They later paired her with Adam Willis (Ian Williams), who later became her husband. Buchanan departed on 25 July 1991 and reprised the role briefly in April and August 2019 to facilitate the introduction of her daughter, Roxy Willis (Zima Anderson). She reprised the role again in January and April 2022.

== Casting ==
Neighbours producers had planned to introduce a number of new characters into the series to "freshen up" the show. Buchanan was one of the first actresses casting directors approached to join the series. In March 1990, a Neighbours publicist confirmed that producers were negotiating with Buchanan to join the show. She was apprehensive about committing to the show long-term and was signed to a six-month contract with the possibility of it being extended.

== Development ==
=== Characterisation ===
Gemma arrives in Erinsborough to live with Madge Bishop (Anne Charleston) following the death of her mother. Gemma had already spent time living with other relatives around Brisbane before making the move to Erinsborough to concentrate on her studies. Madge has a spare room and does not mind taking her in but Gemma feels like she is getting in the way. After one month on-screen the actress believed her character lacked direction. Buchanan told Caron James from TV Week that "the role of Gemma is pretty much up in the air at the moment, I don't think the writers have decided where they want to go with her yet. In a way, that's good because it gives me a chance to develop the role."

Gemma is characterised as "care free and independent" but is more interested in having a good time rather than studying. But she is intelligent and capable of achieving more than she does. She enjoys playing netball and listening to classical and acid house music. Anthony Hayward wrote in his book "The who's who of soap operas" that Gemma soon settled into the Bishop household and became popular with other residents because of her willingness to stand up for her friends. She was also unafraid to challenge her teachers. Gemma remained unsure about her career aspirations during her time in the series. She thought about nursing, but had an invested interest in environmental science. Gemma's style was bland when she first arrived on-screen. Buchanan told Caroline Westbrook from TV Hits that she was "totally different to Gemma" because she was going to high school and dependent on her aunt and uncle. Buchanan also disliked Gemma's dress sense and style. She explained that she hated "probably just about everything in the beginning. For the first six months it was horrendous, and then for the second they tried to vamp up the show a bit. I think the grey school uniform was probably the ugliest thing."

Producers also changed Gemma's appearance beyond her attire by cutting Buchanan's hair short and dying it blonde. Buchanan revealed to Chrissie Camp and David Brown from TV Week that she was "happy" with Gemma's makeover. She talked to producers about Gemma's transformation and wanted to get a new hair cut regardless. Buchanan added "Gemma is dressing in much more modern and mature stuff. There's much more care going into her appearance than before." She also believed that producers were investing more money into the show and Gemma benefited from this. Producers later entrusted the character with adult stories. They achieved this by Gemma finishing school and getting a job. Buchanan was happy that writers had further developed Gemma. She explained to Camp and Brown that when Gemma was at school she would just gossip in the corridors whereas it was more interesting to perform adult themed stories. She added "there's just more for the character to do." Buchanan wanted Gemma to be involved in more storylines that copied current issues of the early 1990s. She branded Gemma as "excitable and quite determined" and Buchanan believed that these personality traits would have been ideal for stories dealing with environmental and social problems.

=== Relationships ===
Following her introduction Gemma briefly dated Ryan McLachlan (Richard Norton). Writers soon devised another relationship storyline between her and Matt Robinson (Ashley Paske). The pair were involved in a motorbike crash story in which Gemma nearly had to have her leg amputated. The story was previewed in the 29 December 1990 issue of TV Week. Their writer revealed that the story begins in early 1991, following Gemma and Matt moving into together. This annoys Madge and Harold Bishop (Ian Smith) but their relationship continues to develop regardless. The writer adding "the romance shows no signs of cooling and heats up" when Matt decides to buy Gemma a motorbike. They both go on a bike ride but crash into a truck, with Gemma taking the brunt of the impact. They concluded that Matt would be "overcome with guilt" and face the prospect of losing Gemma.

The incident created a rift between Matt and Gemma's father Tom Ramsay (Gary Files), who disapproved of their relationship. In her book The Neighbours Programme Guide, author Josephine Monroe wrote that Tom "took every opportunity to attack Matt for being irresponsible and unsuitable for his beloved daughter. He couldn't help wishing that Gemma had never split up with her previous boyfriend." Writers created a dilemma for Gemma and introduced her ex-boyfriend Aidan Devlin (Blake Collins) into the show. Their relationship is marred because Gemma is "confused" by his arrival and Matt is unhappy with the situation. Aidan tries to convince Gemma to give their relationship another chance and Gemma realises she still has feelings for him. Matt becomes so jealous that he accuses her of betraying him. Gemma manages to convince Matt that nothing happened between her and Aidan. Writers used the breakdown of their relationship as part of Matt's exit story. He decides that he cannot trust Gemma and decides to move to Adelaide. When Paske decided to leave his role as Matt he claimed that scriptwriters had run out of ideas for his character. He noted that this only occurred once Matt left school and moved in with Gemma and their relationship became more serious. After this, Gemma attempts to move on by having a brief "fling" with Glen Donnelly (Richard Huggett).

Writers created a new relationship storyline alongside medical student Adam Willis (Ian Williams). Di Stanley from TV Extra reported that the character would experience problems with Adam when she discovers he condoned her ex-boyfriend Ryan's drug taking. Stanley revealed that Gemma would pay Adam a "stormy visit" to confront him over the matter. In March 1991, TV Week reported that Buchanan would be leaving the role and would not renew her contract. A Neighbours publicist downplayed Buchanan's departure but the publication claimed that Buchanan was already pursuing other projects. Buchanan's departure occurred as part of a revamp of Neighbours following a decline in ratings. Network Ten's executive John Holmes decided to write out eight characters and introduce new actors. In the lead up to her exit from the series Gemma graduates from high school and becomes a vet. She later receives a job offer in Newcastle and leaves. Adam decides to go to Newcastle to be with Gemma one month later and off-screen they marry and have children. Monroe, who also wrote Neighbours: The First 10 Years stated "like many other Ramsay Street teenagers, Adam and Gemma confounded the odds by making a go of things." After Buchanan left the series and went to secure work in the United Kingdom. Of her departure from Neighbours, Buchanan told TV Hits' Westbrook that she did not miss being on the show.

=== Returns ===
Buchanan reprised her role in 2019 to facilitate the introduction of Gemma's daughter, Roxy Willis (Zima Anderson). Gemma returns to ask her sister-in-law, Terese Willis (Rebekah Elmaloglou), to care for "wild child" Roxy and end her disorderly behaviour. Gemma draws on Terese's troubled backstory to persuade her into letting Roxy stay. Buchanan reprised the role a few months later, as Gemma returns to help and advise Roxy, who has been having a difficult time.

In December 2021, Neighbours released a promotional trailer for Roxy's upcoming storylines that revealed Buchanan had reprised the role once again for her on-screen daughter's wedding to Kyle Canning (Chris Milligan), which she initially disapproves of. Gemma's return scenes aired on 7 January 2022 in the UK and 10 January 2022 in Australia. Buchanan was happy to return once again and believed that Neighbours' tradition of character returns was a success, though she worried viewers may not remember Gemma anymore. When Gemma returns, she has concerns about Roxy and Kyle's decision to marry. Gemma's attitude causes issues with Roxy who retaliates by banning her mother from helping her choose a wedding dress. Buchanan told Alice Penwill from Inside Soap that "I think Gemma's worried that Roxy and Kyle are too young to get married - it's all very sudden." She explained that Gemma does "like" Kyle and is accepting of their relationship; Gemma's issue is that Roxy is too young for commitment. Buchanan assessed that Roxy "has a history of being spontaneous and making rash decisions" and Gemma's failed marriage to Adam adds to her worries. Roxy banning her mother from bridal shopping made things "very awkward" but Gemma "tries to stand her ground". Buchanan noted that Gemma does not want to ruin her relationship with Roxy but they are too alike. Describing their likeness, the actress added "it's tough because they're similar in way - very headstrong! Gemma and Roxy both know what they want... and what they don't!" Buchanan enjoyed the opportunity to reconnect with her old cast mates and working with Anderson. She concluded that "many of my scenes have been with Zima and I just love her. She's just great, and it's honestly been so great to get back into it. The storylines been fun aswell – I've loved it all." Buchanan returned once more in April 2022, where Gemma helps Roxy move to Darwin and discovers that Roxy is pregnant.

== Storylines ==
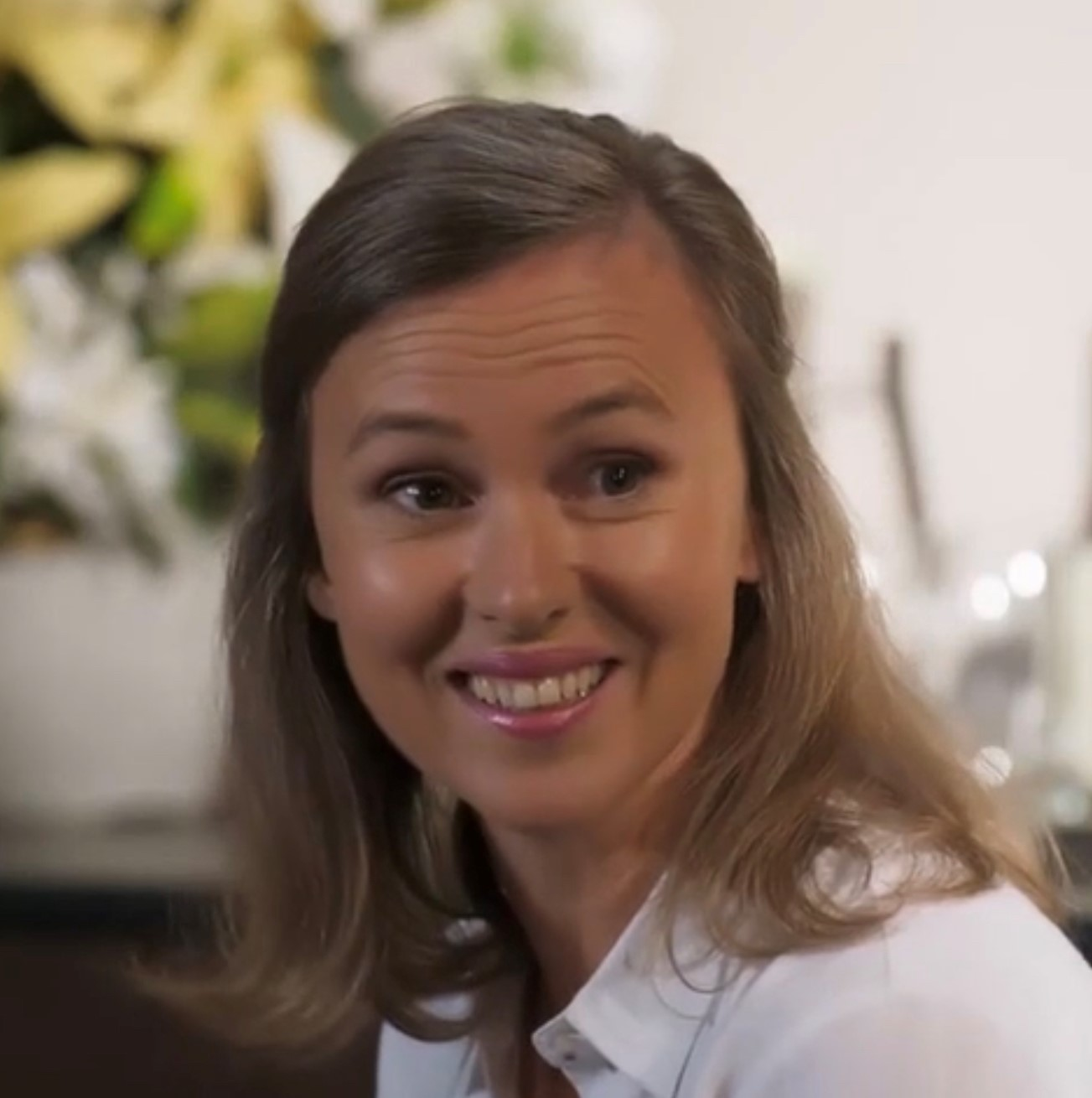
The character as she appeared in 2019.

After the death of her mother, her father struggles to cope and Gemma is sent to stay with relatives in Brisbane, before moving in with her aunt Madge and her husband Harold in Erinsborough. On her arrival, Gemma is reluctant to commit to a relationship as she has recently broken up with Aidan. She briefly dates Ryan McLachlan before getting together with Matt Robinson. Gemma and Matt are involved in an accident when he takes her for a ride on his new motorbike. They are rushed to hospital and Gemma nearly loses a leg due to the severity of the injury. Gemma forgives Matt, but they break up after Aidan visits, sparking Matt's jealousy. Gemma then has a brief romance with Glen Donnelly, before she falls for student doctor Adam Willis.

After successfully passing her Higher School Certificate, Gemma trains to become a vet and nearly loses her job after protesting against the use of animals in a circus. She then gets a job at a wildlife park, but her confidence is shaken when she is bitten by a monkey. Shortly after, Gemma is offered a job at an animal sanctuary in Newcastle. After saying goodbye to Madge, Harold and Adam, Gemma leaves Ramsay Street. Adam follows her to Newcastle a month later, and they become engaged. They later marry and move to Darwin, near Adam's family.

Gemma returns to Erinsborough to visit her former sister-in-law, Terese Willis. Gemma tells Terese that she and Adam want their daughter Roxy to move to Melbourne. They go to the Waterhole and find Roxy lying on the bar and flirting with Leo Tanaka (Tim Kano). Gemma tells Roxy that she is ruining her life, hanging around with a bad crowd in Darwin and partying all night. Terese offers to look out for Roxy if she decides to move to the city, but Gemma asks if Terese can take Roxy in and help her turn her life around. Terese agrees to let Roxy stay for two months, and longer if it works out. Gemma later informs Terese that she and Adam have separated.

Ahead of her wedding to Kyle Canning, Roxy invites Gemma back to Erinsborough where she meets Kyle and his grandmother, Sheila Canning (Colette Mann). When alone with Roxy, Gemma states that she finds it weird Roxy and Kyle are marrying each other, yet have never lived together. When taking her luggage to Roxy's house, Gemma sees her old boyfriend, Glen. Gemma then admits that she came to Erinsborough to stop Roxy's wedding because she believes Roxy is too young and is rushing into marriage. After Gemma talks to Sheila, she makes amends with her daughter. Gemma flirts with Glen, but is shocked to see that he later has sex with Sharon Canning (Natasha Herbert) instead. Gemma attends Roxy and Kyle's wedding, where she walks Roxy down the aisle. Gemma returns three months later to help Roxy and Kyle pack their things in preparation for their move to Darwin. Gemma announces that her and Adam have reconciled, then helps Roxy find out she is pregnant.

== Reception ==
Ruth Deller of television website Lowculture gave Gemma a 2 out of 5 for her contribution to Neighbours, during a feature called "A guide to recognising your Ramsays and Robinsons". Deller said "Tom's second daughter (there's also Moira, who was never in the show) Gemma filled a Charlene-sized gap when she moved in with Madge in the early 90s. She went out with two members of the Robinson clan (Glen and Matt), but eventually left to be with goody-goody Adam Willis". The BBC said Gemma's most notable moment was "Being involved in a motorbike accident with Matt Robinson." Dawn Bebe from BIG! magazine branded Gemma a "plucky" character and said that Buchanan's "soft Aussie accent" made her one of "Neighbours' most popular stars".
