= Toby Mangel =

- Neighbours character
- Geurens as Toby Mangel
- Portrayed by: Finn Greentree-Keane (1988–1990); Ben Geurens (1990–1993)
- Duration: 1988–1993
- First appearance: 10 November 1988
- Last appearance: 3 February 1993
- Introduced by: Don Battye
In-universe information
- Occupation: School student Farmer
- Father: Joe Mangel
- Mother: Noeline Mangel
- Adoptive mother: Kerry Bishop
- Stepmother: Melanie Pearson
- Sisters: Sky Mangel (adoptive)
- Grandfathers: Len Mangel
- Grandmothers: Nell Mangel
- First cousins: Jane Harris

Toby Mangel is a fictional character from the Australian soap opera Neighbours, played by Ben Geurens. He made his first on-screen appearance on 10 November 1988. Toby was originally played by Finn Greentree-Keane from 1988 until 1990. He departed on 3 February 1993.

== Casting ==
From his introduction in 1988, Toby was portrayed by Finn Greentree-Keane. Ben Geurens then took over the role when Greentree-Keane decided to leave in 1990. Geurens had previously done a stunt on Neighbours the year before with the New Generation Stunts company and had doubled for some of the other children. When the producers needed a new actor to play the part of Toby they thought Geurens would be ideal as he already had experience with the show. Geurens said that everything seemed so big on his first day on set and he found working with adults to be "strange". He thought his acting was bad, as he had never done it before, but he later improved. Geurens later recalled that it was an "amazing feeling" to be cast, saying "I remember walking onto the set on the first day to start work but it's hard to take everything in when you're a kid. It all seems like a bit of a blur."

In the 5 December 1992 issue of TV Week, Mark McGowan reported that producers had decided to write Geurens out of the show. Guerens admitted that he was "a bit sad" with the decision, commenting "I guess that's the way the ball bounces." He was told that the writers could not do much more with his character and there was nowhere for him to go. McGowan said there was talk of Toby returning for guest appearances, but Guerens did not think that would happen, adding "Once you go, you go." He departed in 1993.

== Storylines ==
When Toby's mother, Noeline Mangel (Linda McConchie) becomes engaged to Ted Vickers (John Jacobs), a man who constantly berates and bullies Toby, she agrees to Ted's suggestion that they send Toby to stay with his father Joe Mangel (Mark Little), while they get married. Noeline brings him to Erinsborough to meet a reluctant Joe, who shows almost no interest in him and brands him "soft". Toby's cousin Jane Harris (Annie Jones) soon takes him under her wing and helps him make friends with Katie Landers (Sally Jensen) from across the street. Toby also takes a liking to the family Labrador, Bouncer. When Noeline and Ted arrive to collect Toby after Christmas, he is reluctant to leave and Joe has warmed to the idea of being a dad again. When Ted lashes out at Toby over dinner, Joe is quick to step in and defend him. After it emerges that Ted is beating both Noeline and Toby, Joe quickly rescues them and Noeline promptly ends her marriage to Ted and agrees Toby can live with Joe while she gets her life back on track.

When Joe becomes engaged to Kerry Bishop (Linda Hartley), Toby struggles to accept it at first but eventually comes round and serves as pageboy at their wedding. Shortly after, Noeline returns having found a job in Darwin, and wants Toby to live with her. Toby makes the difficult decision to join her, leaving Joe and Kerry upset. When Noeline is run over and killed by a car, Toby returns to Erinsborough, withdrawn and moody and begins bedwetting and sleepwalking. He lashes out at Tiffany "Lochy" McLachlan (Amber Kilpatrick) and smashes the gift he made Noeline for mother's day while visiting her grave.

Kerry agrees to adopt Toby and Joe agrees to adopt Kerry's daughter Sky (Miranda Fryer). Toby is even happier when Joe and Kerry announce that Kerry is pregnant. Tragedy strikes when Kerry is killed during a protest against duck hunting. Toby, although devastated at losing another mother, provides support for Joe at his lowest. When Melanie Pearson (Lucinda Cowden) moves into the Mangel house, her presence manages to brighten up the place. Shortly after Joe and Melanie become engaged, Toby misconstrues an argument and feels he is not wanted and runs away with Bouncer. Toby eventually returns home after a homeless man convinces him to do so and attends Joe and Melanie's wedding as his best man.

After Toby's grandmother, Nell Mangel (Vivean Gray) suffers a heart attack in England, Joe, Melanie and Sky leave to join her and Toby moves in next door with local principal Dorothy Burke (Maggie Dence). They are soon joined by Phoebe Bright (Simone Robertson) after her father Arthur Bright (Barry Hill) dies and they become a family of sorts. When Joe and Melanie return to Australia, they settle in the outback and want Toby to join them as a new school has opened near them. Toby leaves with Dorothy, who manages to secure a job teaching at Toby's new school. Toby later becomes a farmer while in Western Australia. He calls Joe, who is visiting Sky in Erinsborough, to come back to help him and Joe, on the advice of his fiancée Lyn Scully (Janet Andrewartha), returns to join him.

== Reception ==
A writer for the BBC said Toby's most notable moment was "coping with his mother and Kerry's deaths". A columnist for Inside Soap called Toby "the cutest child on Ramsay Street" and said he became a favourite with viewers. During his feature on Neighbours, Graeme Whitfield from The Journal stated "There was also a hero for our times in the shape of Toby Mangel, played with utter star quality by Finn Greentree-Keane from 1988 to 1990 and then, unbelievably, his even better replacement Ben Geurens from 1990 to 1993."
