= Christina Alessi =

- Neighbours character
- Portrayed by: Gayle Blakeney
- Duration: 1990–1992, 2019
- First appearance: 18 January 1990
- Last appearance: 10 September 2019
- Introduced by: Don Battye (1990); Jason Herbison (2019)
In-universe information
- Other names: Linda Giles; Christina Robinson
- Occupation: Lassiter's gift shop manager
- Father: Frank Alessi
- Mother: Margaret Alessi
- Sisters: Caroline Alessi
- Husband: Paul Robinson (1991–2005)
- Sons: Andrew Robinson
- Stepdaughters: Amy Williams
- Grandfathers: Benito Alessi Sr.
- Uncles: Benito Alessi
- First cousins: Lindsay Steiner; Marco Alessi; Rick Alessi

Christina Alessi (also Robinson) is a fictional character from the Australian soap opera Neighbours, played by Gayle Blakeney. She made her first screen appearance during the episode broadcast on 18 January 1990, when she moved into Ramsay Street with her twin sister, Caroline Alessi, played by Gayle's real-life twin, Gillian Blakeney. Christina marries Paul Robinson (Stefan Dennis) and gives birth to their son, Andrew Robinson. Christina departed on 5 August 1992 with Paul and Andrew, following Paul's relocation to Hawaii. Blakeney reprised the role in June 2019 and made her on-screen return on 6 September, alongside her sister.

== Development ==
In 1989, sisters and television presenters Gayle and Gillian Blakeney were cast as twins Christina and Caroline Alessi respectively, after they wrote to the show's producers at Grundy about making an appearance. They started filming their first scenes seven months after signing with the show. The Blakeneys had an interest in twin psychology at the time, and they worked with the scriptwriters to make sure their characters were portrayed as authenticate as possible.

The sisters' fictional backstory was detailed in both Anthony Hayward's The Who's Who of Soap Operas and Josephine Monroe's The Neighbours Programme Guide. It states that identical twins Caroline and Christina were born to an Australian mother and a second-generation Australian father, whose parents had emigrated from Italy. They have an older sister and two younger brothers, but the twins were always closer to each other than anyone else in the Alessi family. When they were younger, the twins often played pranks on their teachers and boyfriends. As they grew older, they kept "a mischievous sense of humour" and shared similar thoughts.

Caroline and Christina developed very different personalities. Where Caroline is more academic, Christina is "less driven and more reserved". She becomes "awkward" under pressure and is untidy and less organised than her sister. She is also characterised as being quieter than the confident Caroline. Christina's ambition in life was to be a good wife and mother. Monroe described her as being "homeloving and maternal". Caroline saw her as the weaker sister. The twins' differing personalities were also shown through their dress sense, with Christina adopting a "casual, girlie" style in contrast to Caroline's business suits.

Producer's created a relationship between Christina and Paul Robinson (Stefan Dennis). Off-screen Blakeney and Dennis also began a two-year relationship, moved in together and later broke-up. Blakeney told Donna Hay from What's on TV that "were both actors so we didn't have any trouble separating the script from real life." In December 1990, a writer from TV Week revealed that scriptwriters were planning a series of relationship issues for Christina and Paul, which would play out in early 1991. They stated the relationship would be "tested severely" and "jealousy rears its head" when Christina accepts a blind date with another man. Writers later devised a pregnancy storyline for the pair. Paul treated the pregnancy with planning and precision. They attended maternity classes and overcome issues in the pregnancy. When Christina goes into labour, Paul's planning goes wrong when he runs out of petrol on the way to the hospital. Christina fears that she will give birth at the road side but they hitchhike in a passing ice cream van and make it to the hospital. Blakeney researched pregnancy thoroughly to prepare for the scenes. She went to an antenatal class, practised breathing exercises and spoke to new mothers. She also arranged to watch a live birth, but arrived at the hospital too late. Blakeney told Hay that "I did everything short of actually having a baby myself." Christina gives birth to a son, Andrew (Shannon Holmes) and Paul is left annoyed that his plans were ruined. Blakeney added that "the baby's safe and sound - unlike Paul's image."

Paul begins to suffer from mental health issues when his business, Lassiters begins to fail. When a client threatens him with a lawsuit, Paul becomes even more stressed. The events lead Paul to seek professional help and he checks into a psychiatric facility. He soon checks out and disappears leaving Christina and Andrew alone. Unbeknownst to Christina, Paul has fled to New Zealand where he reconnects with his daughter, Amy Williams (Sheridan Compagnino). Paul decides to return to Erinsborough and brings Amy to come and live with him, Christina and Andrew. Christina is not impressed with Paul's return and even more annoyed that Amy is with him. Dennis told a reporter from TVTimes that "Paul can't seem to put a foot right. He cracked up when his business got into deep water. Now he's putting his marriage in danger." Christina's behaviour around Amy makes her feel unwelcome and her stay gets off to a bad start. Christina and Amy's relationship remains difficult and they argue most of the time. Lisa Anthony from BIG! magazine observed two as being "at each other's throats" while Paul was caught in the middle of their bickering. Amy also stressed that she did not want to live with Paul which caused arguments between them too. One altercation leaves Amy in need of medical care when she runs in front of Paul's reversing car and is knocked down.

Producers created an infidelity storyline for the Robinson marriage. Writers developed an attraction between Paul and Caroline. For Caroline, the attraction was a dilemma of betraying her sister or missing out on a romantic opportunity. Gillian told a TVTimes reporter that Christina and Paul were having marital problems regardless of her involvement. She added that Caroline did not want to betray her sister but may regret not exploring her feelings for Paul if he and Christina broke-up anyway. The attraction culminates in a passionate kiss. Paul and Christina were having a marriage crisis because Paul's failing business deals and the brief abandonment leaving Christina to look after Andrew alone. She copes fine without Paul and upon his return tries to meddle in Andrew's upbringing. Christina does not want to abandon her marriage and forces Paul to sleep on the sofa. During the night, Caroline leans over Paul to tuck in his blanket and Paul awakes. He mistakes Caroline for Christina and kisses her. Gillian added that Caroline is "really drawn to Paul" but "terribly close to Christina" and would never want to hurt her intentionally.

At first Paul wonders whether his feelings would be reciprocated by Caroline, but the kiss confirms that his feelings are real. Despite their attraction, Paul decides to lie to Christina to save his marriage. Dennis told Chris Twomey from What's on TV that for Paul to have another failed marriage would "make him look stupid". Therefore Paul is desperate to hide the truth. Caroline struggles more with the guilt of betraying her sister and flees to Italy to mull over her feelings. Caroline's sudden departure leaves Christina "confused and bewildered". She cannot understand why Caroline would leave her when they are best friends as well as sisters. Gayle told Twomey that if Christina discovered the truth "she would go off the rails, she'd be deeply hurt that her husband and her sister had betrayed her." Gillian added that "Caroline feels terrible about what's happened and yet she's frightened by her feelings for Paul."

Paul decides to change his behaviour after prioritising his time in Lassiters over Christina and Andrew. Paul tries to save his marriage after a couple of months, Christina is willing to forgive Paul. Getting along better, Paul sees what he could have lost and decides that a lavish gesture could show Christina what she means to him. He decides to restage their wedding, books a celebrant and forces his family and friends to keep it a secret. Dennis told a reporter from TVTimes that "Paul is a desperate man" and "he knows he's nearly blown it with Christina." He explained that Paul wants a "fresh start" and wants "to go back to the beginning" when they were first married. He enlists the help of Gaby Willis (Rachel Blakely) who pretends to need Christina to model a dress design for one of her clients. She also convinces Christina to wear make-up and lures her to the ceremony. Of the restaged marriage, Dennis added "the whole thing certainly brings Paul and Chrissie closer and seals the bond for their future years together."

On 1 June 2019, it was announced that the Blakeney twins had reprised their roles for three episodes to air in September. They filmed their scenes during the same week, before returning to Los Angeles on 7 June. Of their return to the serial, Gayle Blakeney stated, "We were tickled pink to be asked back and we knew if they wanted to reprise the characters after so long, it had to be for a great storyline – which it is. We're really looking forward to filming it." Christina returned in scenes set in Queensland on 6 September 2019.

== Storylines ==
Christina and Caroline witness a murder and are placed under a witness protection programme, which sees them move into 22 Ramsay Street. They are advised to act as one person by the police and they chose the alias 'Linda Giles'. Caroline begins working for Paul at The Robinson Corporation and proved to be good at the job, unlike Christina. During an occasion that Christina is posing as Linda, Paul discovers their secret when Caroline walked in on him and Christina. The police eventually caught the murderer after he appeared in Ramsay Street after tracking the twins down, and they were able to go back to being themselves. They then invite Paul to move in with them and he agrees. Both Christina and Caroline fell for Paul and make a pact that neither one should have him. Christina get managing the gift shop at Lassiter's Hotel, surprising Paul and Caroline by her success.

Christina decides to pursue Paul after Caroline dates Adam Willis (Ian Williams) and are delighted when Paul announces that he is in love. However, Paul is talking about Isabella Lopez (Mich White), a woman who he has gotten engaged to while he was away on business in Argentina. Christina is devastated and takes an instant dislike to Isabella. After some digging, Christina exposes Isabella's intentions of getting Paul's money and gaining Australian citizenship. Christina believed that she and Paul were going to be together, but he announces he is finished with women for good. During a holiday with Paul, Adam and Rory Marsden (Tom Jennings), Christina begins flirting with Rory to make Paul jealous, which works and Paul admits to Christina that he loves her. They get engaged and shortly after, they marry and have the reception on a cruise ship. Christina thinks she is pregnant and Paul is thrilled by the news and looks forward to being a father again. However, Christina is old by a doctor that she was not pregnant and, feeling guilty about getting Paul's hopes up, she decides not to tell him and tries to sleep with Paul at every moment to get pregnant. She eventually falls pregnant and when she went into labour, Paul drives her to the hospital, but the car runs out of petrol and stopped. Paul eventually manages to persuade an ice cream van driver to take them to the hospital. Christina then gives birth to a son, Andrew Robinson (Shannon Holmes).

Following Paul's nervous breakdown following financial problems, he leaves Christina and Andrew for several weeks. When Paul returns, he brings his 8-year-old daughter Amy Williams (Sheridan Compagnino) with him much to Christina's surprise. Christina and Amy struggle to get along but make up just before Amy is returned to her mother, Nina Williams (Leigh Morgan). When Caroline abruptly leaves Erisnborough, Christina is shocked and later over hears Paul and his grandmother Helen Daniels (Anne Haddy) talking about Paul and Caroline's affair. Christina throws Paul out of their house and flies to see her sister, where they eventually make up and Christina returns to Erinsborough, where she files for divorce and full custody of Andrew, but Paul convinces Christina that he loves her and Christina gives him a second chance. They renew their vows in a ceremony at No. 22 and leave Ramsay Street for a new start running a hotel in Hawaii. They later move to Brazil. Their marriage falls apart in the intervening years when Paul returns to Australia to serve a seven-year-prison sentence for fraud, and they later divorce.

When Andrew (now Jordan Patrick Smith) arrives in Erinsborough to see his father, he tells Paul that after living in Scotland for eight years, he and Christina eventually settled down in Sydney. Andrew begins acting up and defying Paul's wife Rebecca Napier (Jane Hall), who calls Christina and asks if Andrew can return to Sydney. However, Christina tells Rebecca that she does not want her son to come home.

Years later, Paul finds Christina and Caroline at a resort in Queensland, where he and his fiancée Terese Willis (Rebekah Elmaloglou) have eloped to. Paul is convinced the universe is giving him a sign not to marry Terese, after his other ex-wives turned up in Erinsborough. Paul soon learns from Caroline that the wives are part of a plot orchestrated by his daughter Elle Robinson (Pippa Black). Caroline apologises on her sister's behalf and they both make amends with each other, as well as Paul and Terese. Christina and Caroline act as witnesses for the wedding and they decide to spend some time together before returning to their respective homes.

== Reception ==
The BBC named Christina's most notable moment as being "When she took off with Andrew without Paul knowing." In one story, Caroline and Christina swap identities to secure a business deal. James Cockington from The Sydney Morning Herald branded the story as a "contrived" effort and raunchy plot ploy designed to beat rival soap opera Home and Away in television ratings. A critic for the Hull Daily Mail was not a fan of the character, writing "drippy Christina (Gayle Blakeney) is so wet you could wring her out. It is extremely unusual for me to have any sympathy for her wooden top husband Paul (Stefan Dennis). But the way his wife whimpers away about her baby and seems like she is going to burst into tears at any moment just drives me crazy. Christina has only just come back from seeing her sister in Milan, after leaving Paul holding the baby, and when she returns expects him to hand it over and move out of their home so she can live there. What a cheek!"

An Inside Soap writer opined that Christina was not as smart as Caroline but the more "dim, slightly podgier twin". Chris Twomey of What's on TV branded Christina as "Paul's long-suffering wife". Of Christina's marriage, a TVTimes reporter stated that "no marriage can be perfect. Even so, Neighbours' Paul and Christina Robinson seem to have had more than their fair share of ups and downs. And for the most part, the bad times seem to have been the fault of the ambitious Paul." Kate Randall from Heat included Christina and Caroline in the magazine's top ten Neighbours characters of all time feature. Randall stated "true fans could tell them apart – shame Christina's husband Paul couldn't. He was constantly torn between the twins after their arrival."
