= WYSIWYG (TV series) =

Television series

- Developed by: Yorkshire Television
- Country of origin: United Kingdom
- Original language: English
- No. of series: 1
- No. of episodes: 5

Production
- Running time: 22 minutes

Original release
- Network: ITV
- Release: 29 June – 27 July 1992

WYSIWYG is a 1992 CITV children's series broadcast in ITV. Five episodes were produced. It stars Julie Dawn Cole as Maz, Clive Mantle as Globyool and Nick Wilton as Wysiwyg.

Each episode starts as a different show (usually a parody of a popular ITV programme of the time, e.g. Blockbusters). The parody is then interrupted by an IGTV ("InterGalactic Television") broadcast from the planet Merdocc.
