= Ryan McLachlan =

Fictional character in the Australian television series Neighbours

- Neighbours character
- Portrayed by: Richard Norton
- Duration: 1990–1991
- First appearance: 15 February 1990
- Last appearance: 21 March 1991
- Introduced by: Don Battye
In-universe information
- Occupation: Student; Waiter; Postman; Soldier
- Father: Russell McLachlan
- Mother: Petra McLachlan
- Sisters: Tiffany McLachlan
- Grandfathers: Clarrie McLachlan
- Grandmothers: Stella McLachlan
- Aunts: Dorothy Burke

Ryan McLachlan is a fictional character from the Australian soap opera Neighbours, played by Richard Norton. He made his first appearance on 15 February 1990 and remained on the show until 21 March 1991.

== Casting ==
Following the departure of Craig McLachlan, who played Henry Ramsay, producers began a search for possible "heart-throbs" to replace him. They cast Adelaide actors Richard Norton and Jeremy Angerson as Ryan and Josh Anderson respectively. Their casting was publicised in the 6 January 1990 issue of TV Week. On comparisons to McLachlan, Norton described Ryan as "a natural, athletic type like Craig" and thought those traits were what the producers were looking for. He joked "Having the name McLachlan did worry me a bit... but I'm Richard Norton, that's who I am." Norton was not concerned about the pressure of stepping into McLachlan's shoes, noting that the show had lost some actors and needed new characters.

Neighbours marked Norton's first "proper" acting job. He had previously done some radio voice-overs and acted in school productions, but he was starting a traineeship in hotel work when he auditioned for the serial. Norton later told another reporter from TV Week that he had grown in confidence after numerous auditions and when the opportunity to play Ryan arose "everything just happened at once." He also said that he "couldn't believe his luck" when he received the role of Ryan. Norton thought that he might have been chosen because he had "a look", saying "That's it in this industry. They do go for the looks. There's got to be some talent there, too, but I think you've just got to be natural." Norton was nineteen when he began filming and he relocated to Melbourne for the part. He admitted to being scared on his first day, so he was relieved to see Angerson, whom he had met at the auditions in Adelaide. As well as being cast at the same time, Norton and Angerson lived together in a flat share.

== Development ==
Ryan is the older brother of Tiffany McLachlan (Amber Kilpatrick) and he is very protective towards his younger sister. Anthony Hayward, author of The Who's Who of Soap Operas, described Ryan as "intelligent and excellent in sports such as athletics, surfing and basketball". Ryan also enjoyed singing, girls and looking for something new and exciting. He was popular and proved to be a loyal friend. Hayward went on to say that while Ryan had a mischievous sense of humour, he often became annoyed when he was the victim of his sister's practical jokes. Ryan moved to Erinsborough, after being expelled from his private school. When he started at the local high school, Ryan told the other pupils that he had been expelled for locking a teacher in a cupboard.

Ryan and Tiffany come to Ramsay Street to stay with their aunt, Dorothy Burke (Maggie Dence). The storyline highlighted how Dorothy was ill-equipped to look after children and helped learn more about the character's background. After he finishes school, Ryan secures a job as a postman and later meets an older woman, Virginia Wenham (Kristie Grant). She tries to seduce Ryan and Norton described his character as "awkward in this situation". He explained that was a coming-of-age storyline for Ryan, adding "he's a healthy young teenager and he thinks 'Wow! an older woman.'"

Norton stayed with Neighbours for one year until he left to join the cast of fellow soap opera Home and Away. His departure was publicised in the 22 December 1990 issue of TV Week. Chrissie Camp reported that his one-year contract would not be renewed when it ran out in February 1991. Norton expressed his disappointment at being written out, telling Camp: "I was really counting on the next six months to be working, but that's the way it goes in this business. It was my first experience in television so I've learnt a lot." He admitted that he did not know what he was doing when he started, explaining that he received a one-page character synopsis and he did not realise that you have to "grab the character at the start and decide on something then." Norton said that he was scared by it all and it took months for him to work out what he could do with his character. He also wished that there was more communication with the writers and directors about Ryan.

Norton did not believe that he made the role a success. He later told Mark Barden from the Reading Post that "I learned a lot working on Neighbours but it took longer to fit in with the established stars. I played a pretty subdued character in Neighbours, I suppose I was a bit scared because everything was new so I did hold back quite a bit with Ryan." Ryan's departure storyline saw him leave Ramsay Street to join the army. His final episode, which was broadcast on 21 March 1991, featured Dorothy trying to talk him out of joining.

== Storylines ==
Ryan arrives in Erinsborough after being expelled from private school. After an initially frosty start, he soon makes friends with Nick Page (Mark Stevens), Sharon Davies (Jessica Muschamp), Matt Robinson (Ashley Paske) and Lee Maloney (Maree Ackehurst). Sharon takes a shine to Ryan but he is oblivious to this, instead asking her if a friend of hers is interested in him.

When Dorothy becomes principal of Erinsborough High, he finds it hard to swallow and receives some teasing about it. Gemma Ramsay (Beth Buchanan) moves with her aunt Madge (Anne Charleston) and uncle Harold Bishop (Ian Smith) and both Matt and Ryan are taken with her. Ryan is disappointed when Gemma chooses Matt. Ryan's parents, Russell and Petra (Bernadette Wheatley), go overseas and he moves in with Dorothy. After doing a little digging, Ryan uncovers the truth about his uncle Colin (Robert Alexander) being in prison, rather than being dead as Dorothy had led him to believe. After Colin is paroled, he and Dorothy give their marriage another chance, but it falls apart when Colin is discovered having an affair with Rosemary Daniels (Joy Chambers). Ryan then stands by Dorothy during the fallout.

Ryan later passes his HSC and decides to become a postman. During one of his rounds he is seduced by married woman Virginia Wenham but before anything can happen, Ryan flees when her husband, Bernie (Robert Morgan) almost catches them one day. Bernie recognizes Ryan and after selling him Encyclopedias against his will, he threatens him to stay away from Virginia. After listening to Jim Robinson's (Alan Dale) Vietnam War stories, Ryan decides to enlist in the army. This decision shocks Ryan's friends and Dorothy but they agree to support him all the way and Ryan leaves Erinsborough.

== Reception ==
A writer for the BBC's Neighbours website said Ryan's most notable moment was "telling his rich girlfriend to hit the road".
