= Caroline Alessi =

Fictional character from the soap opera Neighbours

- Neighbours character
- Portrayed by: Gillian Blakeney
- Duration: 1990–1992, 2019
- First appearance: 18 January 1990
- Last appearance: 10 September 2019
- Introduced by: Don Battye (1990); Jason Herbison (2019)
In-universe information
- Other names: Linda Giles
- Occupation: Co-manager of The Robinson Corporation and Lassiter's Hotel; Hotel manager
- Father: Frank Alessi
- Mother: Margaret Alessi
- Sisters: Christina Alessi
- Grandfathers: Benito Alessi Sr.
- Uncles: Benito Alessi
- Nephews: Andrew Robinson
- First cousins: Lindsay Steiner; Marco Alessi; Rick Alessi

Caroline Alessi is a fictional character from the Australian soap opera Neighbours, played by Gillian Blakeney. She made her first appearance during the episode broadcast on 18 January 1990, alongside her twin sister Christina Alessi, played by Gillian's real-life twin, Gayle Blakeney. Both sisters reprised their roles in June 2019, and returned on 6 September.

== Development ==
In 1989, twins Gillian and Gayle Blakeney were cast as sisters Caroline and Christina Alessi respectively, after they wrote to the show's producers at Grundy about making an appearance. The pair almost went to fellow Australian soap Home and Away, but they preferred Neighbours as a programme and they wanted to stay in Melbourne, where it was filmed. They began filming their first scenes seven months after signing with the show. The Blakeneys had an interest in twin psychology and they worked with the scriptwriters to make sure their characters were portrayed as authentically as possible. Gillian told Hilary Kingsley of the Daily Mirror that for a joke, she and Gayle swapped places during one scene and no one noticed. Gayle also revealed that cast members would sometimes say hello to one twin twice, as they could not tell them apart.

The character's fictional backstory was detailed in Anthony Hayward's The Who's Who of Soap Operas book. It stated that Caroline and her identical twin sister Christina were born to an Australian mother and a second-generation Australian father, whose parents had emigrated from Italy. When they were younger, the twins were "very close" and played pranks on their teachers and boyfriends. As they grew older, they kept "a mischievous sense of humour" and often shared similar thoughts.

Caroline is portrayed as the more academically gifted sister, and she is more "socially adept". She is characterised as being confident and outgoing, as well as organised and tidy. Lorna Cooper of MSN TV also found that Caroline was the more career-minded and confident twin, in contrast to Christina, who was quiet. Before moving to Erinsborough, Caroline worked in several hotels and restaurants, eventually moving up to a more managerial role. Caroline has a brief romance with Jim Robinson (Alan Dale) when he separates from his wife.

In April 1992, it was announced that Blakeney had decided to leave Neighbours to concentrate on her music career. Producers created an infidelity storyline which threatened to destroy her sister's marriage to Paul Robinson (Stefan Dennis). Writers had developed an attraction between Caroline and Paul which later became an issue when the pair share a passionate kiss. The kiss occurs during a time that Paul and Christina had been having marital problems. Paul had briefly abandoned Christina and upon his return tries to meddle in Andrew's upbringing. Gillian told a TVTimes reporter that Caroline is "really drawn to Paul" but "terribly close to Christina". On-screen, Christina makes Paul sleep on the sofa to give her space. Caroline leans over Paul to tuck in his blanket and Paul awakes. He mistakes Caroline for Christina and kisses her. Gillian that "she would never want to do anything to hurt her sister." However, Caroline still could not deny her feelings. Caroline feels relieved when she finally confesses her love for Paul. Blakeney added that Paul and Christina seemed to be failing so "Caroline would really be kicking herself if she stepped out of the picture and Paul and Christina split up anyway."

Paul had been pondering his feelings for some time but the kiss confirms that his feelings are reciprocated. After the kiss, Caroline feels the burden of guilt and flees to Italy to escape her feelings. Gillian told Chris Twomey from What's on TV that "Caroline feels terrible about what's happened and yet she's frightened by her feelings for Paul." She also found the storyline inconceivable because she would never betray Gayle like Caroline had Christina. Christina struggles to understand why her best friend and twin sister would leave without an explanation. She is left feeling "confused and bewildered". Gayle told Twomey that discovering the truth would destroy Christina emotionally. She explained that "she would go off the rails, she'd be deeply hurt that her husband and her sister had betrayed her." Despite his growing attraction to Caroline, Paul decides to lie to Christina to save his marriage. Dennis added that for Paul is desperate to hide the truth because another failed marriage would "make him look stupid". The storyline formed Blakeney's departure after Caroline was written out of the series.

Blakeney chose to leave Neighbours in February 1992. She planned to record another single with her sister and study in Paris for a month. Of her decision to leave, Blakeney stated "While I love the character and I have thoroughly enjoyed myself on the show, I feel it is time to move on as an actor. It was my first acting experience and it's been a great grounding." She added that she would miss her character and her fellow cast members. Blakeney filmed her final scenes on 3 April. Gayle was contracted with the show until July 1992 and was happy to stay for longer, as she felt there would be "plenty of life" for Christina after Caroline leaves.

On 1 June 2019, it was announced that both Blakeney sisters had reprised their roles for three episodes to air in September. They filmed these during the same week, before returning to Los Angeles on 7 June. Of their return to the serial, Gillian Blakeney stated, "Strangely enough it feels so comfortable and familiar despite the obvious changes. The cast and crew have been so welcoming."

== Storylines ==
Caroline and her sister twin Christina arrive on Ramsay Street under the pseudonym "Linda Giles" after witnessing a murder and rent Number 22 from Paul. Melanie Pearson (Lucinda Cowden) soon discovers "Linda" is actually two people and the twins eventually reveal the truth to Paul. Carter, the murderer is soon caught and Caroline begins working at Lassiters'. Paul opts to move back in and the twins realise they are attracted to him and both girls agree not to pursue him, and Caroline begins dating Paul's father, Jim Robinson (Alan Dale) who is going through a messy separation with his wife, Beverly Marshall (Shaunna O'Grady). Caroline later dates medical student Adam Willis (Ian Williams) but it does not last long and they decide to become friends.

After Paul and Christina marry, Caroline feels left out but soon cheers up after Rosemary Daniels (Joy Chambers) offers her a job with the Daniels corporation in New York. While over there, Caroline discovers hotelier Donald Henson (John Simpson) is plotting a takeover via a merger with Lassiter's in order to force Paul out of business and tells Paul. Paul is grateful and then asks Caroline back to work with him with a pay increase, which she agrees to. On her return to the office, she and Martin Tyrell (Nicholas Bell) bump heads when he mistakes her for a receptionist and they clash. Caroline begins experiencing sympathetic labour pains for Christina, who is about to give birth that day. After Christina gives birth to her and Paul's son Andrew (Shannon Holmes), Caroline and Martin get caught up in the moment and kiss. They begin a relationship and suffer a setback when Caroline discovers Martin is married with children but Martin assures Caroline that his marriage to Shelley Tyrell (Kate Langbroek) is over and they are separated. Caroline finds this is a lie when Shelley arrives at Martin's place with their children. Caroline is left heartbroken when Martin decides to go back to his family.

When Caroline and Paul are stranded in the bush when their car breaks down, they become closer to one another. There is an attraction, but both deny it. When Christina throws Paul out of the bedroom, he is on the sofa. Caroline comes down for some water and Paul mistakes her for Christina and kisses her and continues even after he realises he is kissing Caroline. Caroline struggles to cope with the guilt and panics when her cousin Marco Alessi (Felice Arena) overhears a conversation between her and Paul about the kiss. Caroline quickly flees Erinsborough after taking a job in Italy running a hotel. Christina is confused and devastated but once she hears Paul confessing to Helen Daniels (Anne Haddy) over Andrew's baby monitor about the kiss, she throws Paul out and goes to Milan to confront Caroline and they talk things out and reconcile. Caroline then opts to stay overseas and run her own hotel.

Years later, Caroline attempts to stop Christina from sabotaging Paul and Terese Willis's (Rebekah Elmaloglou) wedding. After Paul and Terese flee to Queensland, Paul is shocked to find Christina at the hotel bar and is convinced the universe is giving him a sign. Christina soon tells Paul that his ex-wives coming after him was a plot orchestrated by his daughter Elle Robinson (Pippa Black). Caroline apologises on Christina's behalf and the twins make amends with each other as well as Paul and Terese. Christina and Caroline act as the two witnesses for the wedding. They decide to spend some time together before returning home, and they bid farewell to Paul and Terese.

== Reception ==
Ian Morrison, author of Neighbours: The Official Annual 1992, observed that the twins' arrival "brought glamour to Erinsborough", as well as "a considerable amount of confusion." An Inside Soap writer opined that Caroline was the smarter sister when compared to Christina. The BBC's official Neighbours website said the character's most notable moment was "Kissing Paul after he had married her sister." James Cockington from The Sydney Morning Herald branded the story in which Caroline and Christina swap identities to secure a business deal "contrived". He accused Neighbours of making the plot raunchy to beat rival soap opera Home and Away in viewership. A Soaplife writer included Caroline and Paul's affair in their "top 10 relative romps" feature. A writer from The Journal chose Paul meddling in Caroline's business activities in their "pick of the day" feature. Tony Pratt from the Daily Mirror questioned why Caroline moved abroad in her exit story because the majority of Neighbours characters were simply "exiled" in Queensland. A writer from The Press and Journal opined that "fans of BBC's Neighbours will be on the edges of their seats for the lunch time session, in which Caroline makes a choice between the two men in her life." They also included the Caroline's story in their "best of next week" television feature. Kate Randall from Heat included Caroline and Christina in the magazine's top ten Neighbours characters of all time feature. Randall stated "true fans could tell them apart - shame Christina's husband Paul couldn't. He was constantly torn between the twins after their arrival."
