= Gayle and Gillian Blakeney =

Australian identical twins (born 1966)

- Born: 9 July 1966 (age 59); Brisbane, Queensland, Australia
- Occupation(s): Television actresses, singers
- Years active: 1979-present

Gayle and Gillian Blakeney are Australian identical twins who performed together as actresses and as a dance/pop duo in the 1990s, releasing music under the monikers The Twins and Gayle and Gillian. Born in Brisbane on 9 July 1966, Gayle is older by nine minutes. They starred in the soap opera Neighbours, as twins Caroline and Christina Alessi.

== Early career ==
In 1980 the sisters appeared in a video clip for the Australian group The Monitors’ track "Singin' In The '80s", wearing make-up in the style of rock band Kiss. They also appeared in other music videos by The Monitors between 1980 and 1982, including "Nobody Told Me" and "Having You Around Me". The sisters also presented "Take Your Pick" with Des O'Connor.

== Career ==
In 1983 they joined the team on the successful national children's programme Wombat, along with the puppet Agro. They enjoyed their roles as reporters for the next seven years. The program also included an ongoing mock soap opera segment.

Another advertising appearance took place in the mid-1980s, in a series of futuristic commercials for Coca-Cola, featuring Max Headroom.

The duo signed a recording contract with Mushroom Records in 1990, before taking up roles in soap opera Neighbours as Caroline Alessi (played by Gillian) and Christina Alessi (played by Gayle). The record label put their deal on hold until the duo could build up an international profile with their TV roles. Gillian and Gayle left the show at different stages during 1992.

Following the success of former Neighbours actors Kylie Minogue and Jason Donovan as recording artists, the Blakeneys went to England in 1991 to make a record with Stock Aitken Waterman, originally going by the name 'The Twins'. The collaboration was strained, with the producers then in the process of ending their working relationship as a trio, and Mike Stock admitting he wasn't thrilled by the assignment.

After parting with Stock Aitken Waterman, the Blakeneys made a brief return to Neighbours, eventually leaving the show in 1992. In 1993/1994, they released two singles in the United Kingdom as 'Gayle & Gillian', "Mad If Ya Don't" (#75 on the UK Singles Chart in 1993) and a cover version of Prince's "I Wanna Be Your Lover", re-titled "Wanna Be Your Lover" (UK #62 in 1994 and #45 on the Scottish chart). .

Afterwards the two made a brief return to television, this time as assistants on the Thames Television revived game show Take Your Pick replacing Jodie Wilson. While working in the UK, they also acted on stage.

In 1994, the sisters moved to the United States (where they still reside today, as both call Los Angeles home) to pursue acting roles, landing guest spots on various film and TV projects, such as playing ballerinas in Silk Stalkings.

The sisters are married and have children (Gayle has three, while Gillian has one daughter). As of 2015, the Blakeneys have moved on to launching companies and building brands, with Gillian running a scarf line.

In June 2019, it was announced that both sisters would be reprising their roles on Neighbours in September, which would be for a three-episode stint.

== Discography ==
=== Singles ===
List of singles, with selected chart positions
Title	Year	Peak chart positions	
Title	Year	AUS	UK
"All Mixed Up" As The Twins	1991	74	77
"Mad If Ya Don't!" As Gayle and Gillian	1993	—	75
"Wanna Be Your Lover" As Gayle and Gillian	1994	—	62
