= Kerry Bishop =

- Neighbours character
- Portrayed by: Linda Hartley
- Duration: 1989–1990, 2004, 2006
- First appearance: 1 February 1989
- Last appearance: 10 September 1990
- Created by: Ray Kolle
- Introduced by: Don Battye
In-universe information
- Occupation: Advice columnist Child carer Salesperson
- Father: Harold Bishop
- Mother: Mavis Bishop
- Stepmother: Madge Bishop
- Brothers: David Bishop
- Husband: Joe Mangel (1989–1990)
- Daughters: Sky Mangel
- Adoptive sons: Toby Mangel
- Grandsons: Scotty
- Granddaughters: Kerry Mangel
- Nieces: Serena Bishop

Kerry Bishop is a fictional character from the Australian soap opera Neighbours, played by Linda Hartley. She made her first screen appearance during the episode broadcast on 1 February 1989. Kerry is Mavis and Harold Bishop's (Ian Smith) only daughter and David Bishop's (Kevin Harrington) sister. Kerry left home when she was young to travel the world. She met Eric (John Ley) and fell pregnant with their daughter, Sky (Stephanie McIntosh). Following her arrival in Erinsborough, Kerry began a relationship with Joe Mangel (Mark Little) and they eventually married. Kerry adopted Joe's son and fell pregnant again. However, while out protesting a duck hunt, Kerry was shot and she and her unborn child died. Kerry departed on 10 September 1990, but Hartley returned in 2004 and 2006 to record voice-overs. She also appeared in 2005 as Kerry's look-alike Gabrielle Walker.

== Casting ==
In December 1988, FM104.7's Rob Logan reported in his Canberra Times column that Linda Hartley had joined the cast as Harold Bishop's (Ian Smith) daughter Kerry. Producers introduced the character to rescue Des Clarke (Paul Keane) from depression and had plans for her to eventually become his second wife. However, when Kerry began to interact with Joe Mangel (Mark Little), the pairing became popular with viewers who wanted them to get together romantically. The producers agreed with their opinion and changed her planned storyline.

== Development ==
=== Characterisation ===
Kerry is the only daughter of Mavis and Harold Bishop (Ian Smith). After arriving in Erinsborough, Kerry moved into Number 24 with Harold. However, their very different personalities and views soon became a problem. Kerry had a daughter, Sky (Miranda Fryer; Stephanie McIntosh), out of wedlock and did not care for religion, which shocked Harold, who was a Christian.

=== Departure ===
When her contract came up for renewal in mid-1990, Hartley realised that she was fed up of working long hours, so she decided to quit the role after twenty months. Of her reason to leave, she stated "Once you start to get out of bed and sit in the toilet at five in the morning wailing, 'I don't want to go!' I think it's time to get out." Hartley filmed her final scenes as Kerry in July 1990. She stated that Kerry had been a "wonderful" character to portray and she felt she had had a rewarding experience during her time on Neighbours.

The decision was taken to kill Kerry off and Hartley thought that the end was "certainly final." The actress believed it was the "only logical way" to write her character out, as Joe and Kerry would not have just ended their marriage. She quipped, "If you're going to go, you might as well go with a bang! Producers had months to plan Kerry's death and Josephine Monroe, author of Neighbours: The First 10 Years, noted that they chose to make it as poignant as possible. On-screen, a newly wed Kerry became pregnant, she was finally accepted into the Mangel family by her stepson Toby (Finn-Greentree Keane; Ben Guerens), and she was persuaded to return to her campaigning roots. On 10 September 1990, a heavily pregnant Kerry went to protest against duck hunting with her friend Amber Martin (Alison Whyte). Kerry was hit by a stray bullet and both she and her unborn child died. Kerry became the second regular character to die in Neighbours, following Daphne Clarke's (Elaine Smith) death in 1988.

Hartley reprised her role as Kerry to voice letters to her on-screen daughter, Sky in 2004 and 2006. Hartley re-joined the cast in 2005 in the guest role of Kerry's look-alike Gabrielle Walker.

== Storylines ==
Kerry is the youngest child of Harold and Mavis Bishop. She was a free spirit, in great contrast to her brother David (Kevin Harrington) who had inherited most of Harold's uptight qualities. When Kerry decided to rebel against Harold's way of life, it caused a great deal of friction and Kerry left home to travel the world. Kerry fell pregnant by fellow hippy Eric (John Ley) and they had a daughter, Sky. Kerry wanted to settle down, but Eric didn't and so he left them.

Kerry is first seen in the coffee shop when Edith Chubb (Irene Inescort) complains to Harold about her bringing her own food in. Harold is about to reprimand her but soon recognises Kerry. Harold invites Kerry back to stay with him at Number 24 with him, his wife, Madge (Anne Charleston) and her son Henry Ramsay (Craig McLachlan). Kerry accepts. When Kerry meets Joe Mangel who lives across the road, there is an instant attraction as both are free spirits and have had to contend with stuffy parents. When it transpires Kerry has spent the night with Joe, Harold is appalled as he doesn't think Joe is suitable for Kerry and she decides to leave. Joe, at the last minute talks Kerry out of leaving and she repairs her relationship with Harold

After a while, Kerry and Joe become engaged and later marry in an unorthodox ceremony in a butterfly house and adopt each other's children, Sky and Toby, respectively. The following year, Tragedy strikes when a heavily pregnant Kerry goes to protest against duck hunting in the marshes with her friend Amber Martin. Kerry is hit by a stray bullet and is rushed to hospital. Joe and Harold are devastated when the doctor tells them Kerry and the baby have died due to the severe blood loss from the shooting. Sixteen years after Kerry's death, Sky gives birth to a baby girl and names her Kerry in honour of her mother.

== Reception ==
For her portrayal of Kerry, Hartley won the 1989 Penguin Award for Best Actress in a Drama Serial. A writer for the BBC's Neighbours website stated that Kerry's most notable moment was "Marrying Joe Mangel in the butterfly enclosure at the zoo." Robin Oliver from The Sydney Morning Herald branded Kerry "the greenie martyr". A columnist for the Sunderland Echo named Kerry's death as one of Neighbours' memorable moments. The columnist said it was "One of the most unexpected deaths the show has ever had". Tim Teeman and James Jackson from The Times also named Kerry's death as one of Neighbours' most memorable moments. They said "As the ducks quack all around and Joe gathers her in his befleeced arms, Neighbours eco-hippy Kerry Bishop dies saving ze animals". A Herald Sun reporter called Kerry's death "one of the show's saddest moments". Another Herald Sun reporter included Kerry's death in their "Neighbours' 30 most memorable moments" feature. They also included Kerry and Joe's wedding and assessed that they "were polar opposites but they were married in the butterfly enclosure at Melbourne Zoo." In 2022, Alice Penwill from Inside Soap wrote that Kerry "went out with a bang!"
