= Linda Hartley-Clark =

Australian actress (born 1967)

- Born: 28 December 1967 (age 58); Australia
- Other names: Linda Hartley
- Occupation: Actress
- Years active: 1981–present
- Spouse: John Clark (m. 1989)

Linda Hartley-Clark (born 28 December 1967) is an Australian actress, known for her role as Kerry Bishop on the Australian soap opera Neighbours from 1989 to 1990. She had early lead roles in Cornflakes for Tea, The Bush Gang, and Home, before appearing in The Flying Doctors miniseries as Diana Daniels, and Prisoner as Roach Waters in 1986.

== Career ==
Hartley attended Macleod High School in Melbourne. Hartley began singing and dancing from a young age, before her agent persuaded her to give acting a chance. She was a back-up dancer and singer on the short-lived Tonight with Bert Newton show. She also had a dancing lead role in a production of 42nd Street, which was later postponed. She turned down the narrator role in Joseph and the Amazing Technicolor Dreamcoat to accept a role in The Young Doctors.

Hartley secured her first lead acting role when she was 13 years old in the children's miniseries Cornflakes for Tea. A year later, she played the lead in ABC-TV miniseries The Bush Gang. She then appeared in another lead role in the 1983 series Home. Hartley plays Pauline, one of the residents of the "modern" orphanage, and had to learn to weld for the role. This was followed by a starring role in the South Australian Film Corporation film The Fire in the Stone. Hartley played Diana Daniels in The Flying Doctors miniseries, alongside her future Neighbours co-star Stefan Dennis.

She played Gloria Slater in the Australian soap opera Neighbours, before she was cast as Rachel "Roach" Waters in Prisoner in 1986. That same year, Hartley appeared in While You're Down There, a sketch and stand-up comedy show. Hartley returned to Neighbours in 1989 as series regular Kerry Bishop. After contract negotiations with the production company broke down, Hartley left the serial in 1990. She played Angie in the small-budget Melbourne film Closer and Closer Apart, which was made in 1989 and released in 1992.

After leaving Neighbours, Hartley went to the UK and appeared on gameshow Go Getters, children's series WYSIWYG, crime drama Anna Lee and the film Still Life. She also appeared in both UK and Australian theatre productions. In 2005, Hartley-Clark had a guest stint in Neighbours playing Kerry's lookalike Gabrielle Walker. She also provided voiceovers for Kerry's diary entries which are read by her daughter Sky Mangel (Stephanie McIntosh) in 2004 and 2006.

In 2023, Hartley-Clark appeared on the Talking Prisoner podcast.

== Personal life ==
Hartley-Clark lives in Melbourne. She married musician John Clark, a former drummer with Craig McLachlan's band, Check 1–2, in 1989. They have two children. She also works as a relationship counsellor, having qualified with a PhD from Deakin University.

== Filmography ==
Year	Title	Role	Notes
1981	The Bush Gang		Season 1 — 5 episodes
1981	Cornflakes for Tea	Trish	Season 1 — 6 episodes (main role)
1983	Home	Pauline	Season 1 — 6 episodes
1984	The Fire in the Stone	Sophie Andropoulos	TV Movie
1984	Carson's Law	Peggy Roche	Season 1 — 4 episodes
1985	The Flying Doctors	Diana Daniels	Miniseries — 3 episodes
1985	Neighbours	Gloria Slater	Season 1 — 3 episodes (guest role)
1986	Prisoner	Rachel "Roach" Waters	Season 8 — 27 episodes (recurring role)
1986	While You're Down There	Various	Season 1 — 6 episodes
1989	The Flying Doctors	Linda Gallagher	Episode: "The Storyteller"
1989–1990	Neighbours	Kerry Bishop	Seasons 5–6 – 193 episodes (main role)
1991	Go Getters	Herself	
1992	Closer and Closer Apart	Angie	Video/film
1992	WYSIWYG	Chaz/Linda/Saloon Keeper/Barbie	Season 1 — 5 episodes
1993	Anna Lee: Headcase	Pippa	TV film
1998	Breakers	Unknown role	Unknown episode(s)
1998	All Saints	Linda Taylor	Episodes: "Possession", "Out of Control"
1999	Grange Hill	Airport Check In	Season 22, Episode 7
2005	Neighbours	Gabrielle Walker	Season 21 — 8 episodes (recurring role)
