= Eddie Buckingham =

- Neighbours character
- Portrayed by: Bob La Castra
- First appearance: 3 April 1990
- Last appearance: 28 September 1990
- Introduced by: Don Battye
In-universe information
- Occupation: Café owner and waiter

Eddie Buckingham is a fictional character from the Australian soap opera Neighbours, played by Bob La Castra. He made his first screen appearance during the episode broadcast on 3 April 1990. La Castra created the character for himself after he was told that casting him in the soap would be difficult due to his ethnic background. Eddie was introduced during a series of episodes set in London. He befriends Madge Bishop (Anne Charleston) and Harold Bishop (Ian Smith), and later travels to Australia to visit them. While he is in the country, Eddie lives with the Bishops and runs a food stall. He is portrayed as bright, street wise, and a "typical cockney lovable rogue". The character was written out of the soap when the producers decided to focus on family-oriented drama, and Eddie departed on 28 September 1990.

== Creation and casting ==
After La Castra finished working on children's television series Wombat in 1989, he sent an audition tape to Neighbours. He thought Neighbours should employ an English actor due to the show's popularity in the UK, and the fact that he is black would also add to the storyline. La Castra received a call back, but he was told by producers that his ethnicity would make casting him difficult. He decided to use his background as a writer to create his own character, Eddie Buckingham. La Castra said "I was initially told the part would have been easier to cast if I were Vietnamese, but I lived in a normal street with normal people so I wrote myself in." At the time, producers had been looking to replace the recently departed Henry Ramsay (Craig McLachlan) and believed Eddie would be a suitable replacement. La Castra told Nicola Murphy of TV Week that he went into shock when he learned that he had been hired by Neighbours. The producers asked La Castra to keep his casting a secret for ten weeks before he appeared on-screen. The actor commented "It was agony because I was busting to tell my friends. It's not much fun celebrating on your own!" However, he did tell his foster mother, who had to wait 18 months to see his first episode air in the UK. Neighbours marks La Castra's first major television role, and he was contracted for one year. He made his first appearance in April 1990.

== Development ==
La Castra was the first English actor to join the main cast of Neighbours. His character was introduced to Neighbours during episodes set in London. He meets married couple Madge Bishop (Anne Charleston) and Harold Bishop (Ian Smith) when they frequent the café where he works, while they trace their ancestors. He provides them with tourist information about the city, while they tell him stories about Australia. Madge and Harold invite Eddie to visit them in Australia one day, and he flies over a few days after they return home. The couple provide him with a job in the Coffee Shop and a room at their house. During Eddie's seven months on Neighbours, he appeared primarily as a foil for Harold. La Castra and Smith became good friends off-screen.

La Castra called Eddie a "typical cockney lovable rogue", and described him as "bright and breezy and a one for chatting up the ladies. He has the gift of the gab but is an all-round nice guy. Very smart – streetwise I guess you'd call it." Eddie gets on well with everyone who comes to the Coffee Shop and provides the locals with "gossip, advice and outrageous stories about his days on the road." La Castra told Coral O'Connor of the Daily Mirror that producers were looking for a character who was "a bit of fun", like Henry Ramsay. He said Eddie was similar to Henry, but where Henry did not succeed, everything Eddie does "turns out right." La Castra said that the fact he is from England in real life would be a draw for the English audience. He also reckoned that English viewers would not find it hard to accept his presence in the show, as there were West Indian people living on "every street".

Ahead of filming an early scene in which Eddie rides a bicycle, La Castra informed the producers that he could not ride a bike. He was able to shoot the close ups, but for the long shots the crew asked a Caucasian man to ride the bike and they blacked him up. La Castra admitted that he was surprised and thought there were probably "other skinny black guys in Melbourne" that could have filled in for him. La Castra said nobody ever picked up on the fact he was not riding the bike, even though his double's wrists had not been painted and were exposed when his sleeves rode up. La Castra later said the moment was one of the funniest things to happen during his time on the show.

La Castra was written out of Neighbours in September 1990 along with a series of characters, so the producers could make a return to focusing on family-oriented drama. Josephine Monroe, author of The Neighbours Programme Guide, commented that storyliners failed to provide the character with "convincing plots" during his stint. Eddie returns to England after learning that his father has been taken ill. He made his final appearance on 28 September 1990. In March 2015, La Castra spoke of his time in the show, saying "I am really proud I got to be part of it and it is great to see it is still popular, so all credit to the producers for keeping it going. I still get recognised from time to time as Eddie but a lot of younger people tend to recognise me from Wombat. Most of all, those people who do recognise me ask how Harold is going."

== Storylines ==
Eddie runs a café in London, which is visited by Madge and Harold Bishop while they are on holiday. They couple strike up a friendship with Eddie and before they leave, they ask Eddie to come and visit them in Australia one day. Eddie decides to take them up on their offer and arrives in Australia a few days after Madge and Harold return. Madge and Harold let Eddie stay with them, thinking he would only be with them for a short time.

Eddie begins to act suspiciously and stores large amounts of food in the fridge. Sharon Davies (Jessica Muschamp) finds Eddie selling sandwiches at a food stall. Eddie makes Sharon promise not to tell anyone as he does not have a work permit. Sharon explains to Eddie that Harold's coffee shop is losing business as a result of his food stall and asks him to quit. Harold announces he has reported the business to the council and Eddie admits that he is running the food stall. Madge and Harold are shocked and cannot understand why Eddie needs to work while he is in Australia. Eddie reveals that his café back home has gone bust. Harold buys the food stall and it becomes part of the Coffee Shop. Harold lets Eddie take the food stall around the town to ensure that Harold's business does not suffer. Eddie becomes an attraction for customers and he charms them with his stories.

Eddie falls for twins Caroline Alessi (Gillian Blakeney) and Christina Alessi (Gayle Blakeney) and he tries to get a date with one of them. Caroline pretends to be Christina and makes herself out to be a man-eater. When Eddie and Christina discover Caroline's joke, they tell Caroline that they are engaged after their first date. Eddie and Christina tell Caroline the truth after she organises an engagement party for them. When Eddie hears that his father is sick, he decides to leave Ramsay Street to help his mother care for him.

== Reception ==
Author Josephine Monroe stated "Eddie was a milestone creation for the Neighbours bosses, for not only was he English, but he was also black. And in the snow-white suburb of Erinsborough, Eddie was always going to stand out from the crowd." Andrew Potts of The Gold Coast Bulletin branded Eddie "a cheerful and street-smart café owner". The Daily Mirror's Coral O'Connor branded Eddie a "high-class spiv".

A writer for the BBC's Neighbours website proclaimed that Eddie's most notable moment was "Announcing his joke engagement to Christina." To celebrate the 20th anniversary of Neighbours, a BBC reporter asked readers to nominate their twenty favourite obscure characters. Eddie came in fifteenth place and a reader stated "I liked Eddie Buckingham, played by Bob La Castra. He was an English stand-up comedian who lived with the Bishops for a while. No real explanation was given to why he arrived or, indeed, why he left".
