= Neighbours 30th Anniversary =

2015 Neighbours storyline

- Neighbours episodes
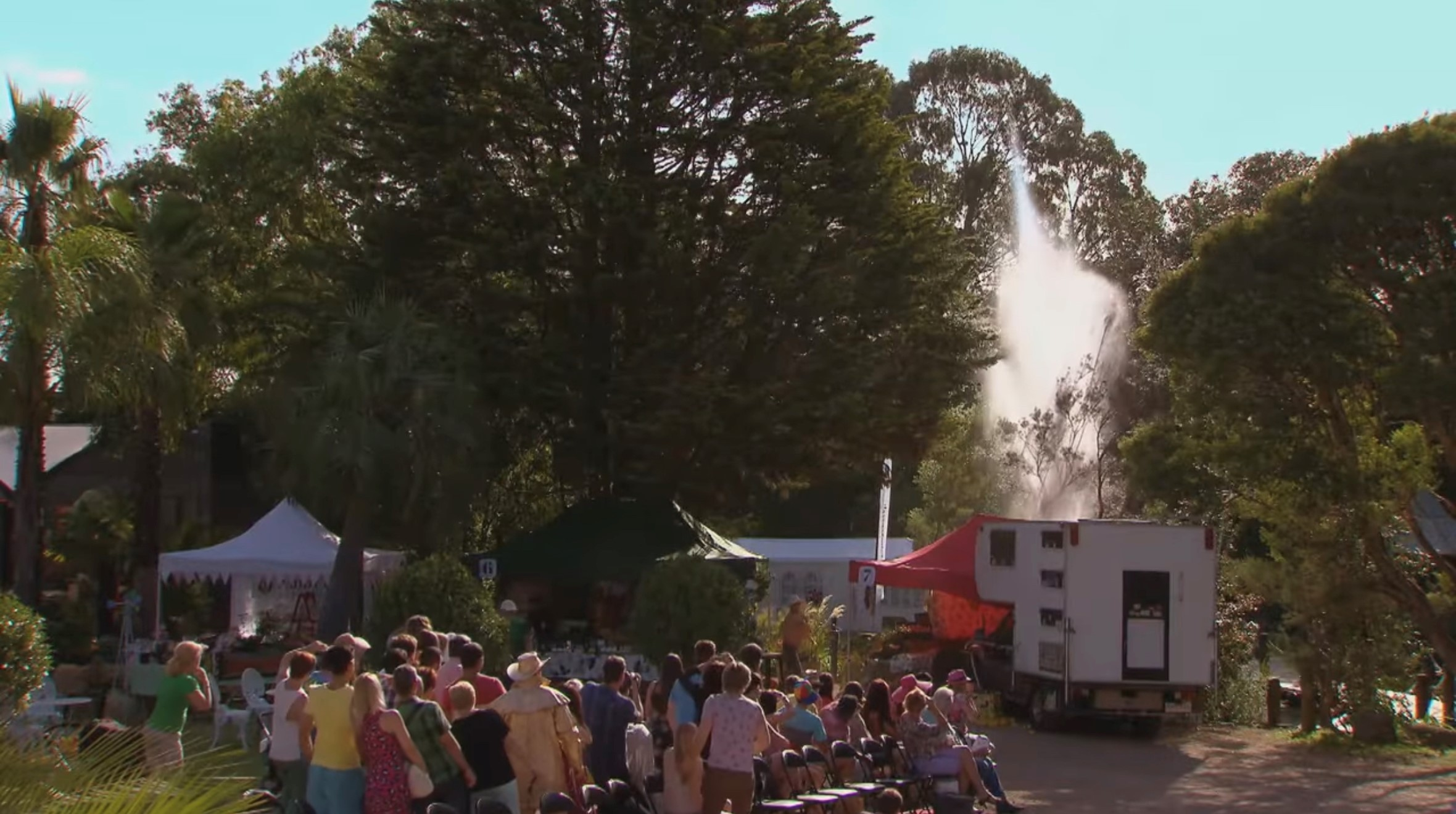
- Harold Bishop (Ian Smith) accidentally crashes his van through a stall on the opening day of the Erinsborough festival. Executive producer Jason Herbison revealed that the scene had long been in development and believed that it had been executed "in a spectacular way".
- Episode nos.: Episodes 7073–7083 (11 episodes)
- Directed by: Tony Osicka; Gary Conway; Scott Major
- Written by: Emma J. Steele; Sarah Mayberry; Sam Carroll; Philippa Burne; Peter Mattessi; Faith McKinnon; Justin Walsh; Peter McTighe; James Walker; Paul Gartside; Sam Meikle
- Original air date: 4–18 March 2015
- Running time: 231 minutes (11x21)

Episode chronology
← Previous; Episode 7072	Next → Episode 7084

The Neighbours 30th Anniversary was a series of celebrations to mark the 30th anniversary of Australian television soap opera Neighbours. The celebrations span over two weeks, beginning on 4 March 2015 in Australia, while starting on 18 March in the United Kingdom. The anniversary features many storylines, but points around Paul Robinson's (Stefan Dennis) Erinsborough festival and the wedding of Daniel Robinson (Tim Phillipps) and Amber Turner (Jenna Rosenow). The serial's executive producer, Jason Herbison, began planning the 30th anniversary over a year in advance. Over ten former cast members from all eras of the show were invited back to "honour the past and present". Kylie Minogue and Jason Donovan were also invited, but they both downturned the offer. The celebrations marked Ian Smith and Anne Charleston's returns to Neighbours as Harold and Madge Bishop respectively. Madge was last seen during her death in 2001 and returns as a ghost in Harold's mind, which Herbison was initially worried would not be accepted by Charleston nor Smith, however both approved of it. The storyline was also popular amongst viewers.

Herbison told Digital Spy that he wanted the anniversary to reignite old storylines, climax current ones and lead into future ones. The Erinsborough festival opens when Harold accidentally drives his campervan into a stand. Over 70 extras and additional cameramen and crew were required for filming. Amber and Daniel's wedding marked the final plot of the celebrations. Daniel and Imogen Willis (Ariel Kaplan), who is hiding her love for Daniel, become trapped in an old well together. Kaplan explained that a set for scenes in the well was specially built with four walls to make Kaplan and Phillipps feel claustrophobic. Herbison also confirmed that at the end of the two-week-long storyline, a character would be killed off. Matt Turner (Josef Brown) is hit by a driver while being confronted by Brad Willis (Kip Gamblin).

Nina Tucker (Delta Goodrem) also returns during the anniversary, which Goodrem revealed herself on social media before it was officially announced by Neighbours. Nina sings "Only Human", a song digitally released by Goodrem to coincide with her return, at the Erinsborough festival closing ceremony. Matt Preston also made a celebrity guest appearance after wanting to get on the serial for over seven years and called his appearance something he could tick off his bucket list. The Neighbours crew were applauded for their efforts in celebrating the milestone and some news outlets believed that the key success of the anniversary was the build-up and climax of Daniel and Amber's wedding. The serial was also critiqued for giving limited screen time to some returning cast members, while some publications judged the cast's acting. Australia Post released special Neighbours stamps in honour of the anniversary.

== Plot ==
=== Episodes 7073 to 7083 ===
The Erinsborough festival commences under Mayor Paul Robinson (Stefan Dennis) and Naomi Canning's (Morgana O'Reilly) supervision by Lassiter's Lake. Susan Kennedy (Jackie Woodburne) acts as a fortune teller and Toadie Rebecchi (Ryan Moloney) poses as a statue. Toadie and Chris Pappas (James Mason) see Lucas Fitzgerald (Scott Major) and Vanessa Villante (Alin Sumarwata) and meet their daughter, Sebastiana (Izabella Anderson), before Vanessa announces her third pregnancy. Harold Bishop (Ian Smith) accidentally drives his caravan through a stall and breaks a fire hydrant, before imagining his dead wife, Madge Bishop (Anne Charleston), sitting next to him. Kyle Canning (Chris Milligan) works on fixing the hydrant and tells his wife, Georgia Brooks (Saskia Hampele), to instead go to the ballet with Nick Petrides (Damien Fotiou), who is joyed following a bet he made with Paul to get Georgia to sleep with him. Harold meets Amber Turner (Jenna Rosenow), the fiancée of his step-grandson, Daniel Robinson (Tim Phillipps). Madge disapproves of Amber and thinks that Imogen Willis (Ariel Kaplan) better suits Daniel, so Harold privately tells Daniel that he does not support their marriage, before Daniel and Amber uninvite him from the wedding. Naomi and Mark Brennan (Scott McGregor) go public about their relationship.

Mark becomes suspicious of Matt Turner (Josef Brown) when he learns that he has been lying about the back pay he has been receiving from his job on the police force to pay off his mortgage. After Mark's brother, Tyler Brennan (Travis Burns), tells Dennis Dimato (David Serafin) that he no longer owes him any favours, Mark spots Matt quitting his job at Dimato's illegal car-stripping firm, so Matt tells his wife, Lauren (Kate Kendall), about it. At the Erinsborough bake-off, Janelle Timmins (Nell Feeney) arrives and nominates her cake, however ends up in an argument with Susan and Sheila Canning (Colette Mann) over whose cake is better. Georgia accidentally breaks the cake stand and all the cakes fall on the floor, except for Karl Kennedy's (Alan Fletcher) trifle. Judge Matt Preston awards Karl with the win. Mark promises not to report Matt if he takes six months of leave and tells him everything about Dimato's ring. Mark's ex-girlfriend, Paige Smith (Olympia Valance), kisses Tyler and accidentally calls him by Mark's nickname, so they agree to stay friends. Lauren tells Brad Willis (Kip Gamblin) about Matt's situation and tells Matt to sleep on the couch. Amber leaves for last-minute photography work, leaving Imogen, who is in love with Daniel, to set up the wedding. Naomi finds out that Paul organised Amber's trip to keep her away on the wedding day. Sheila asks Harold out on a date and Madge encourages Harold to go. Harold leaves the date when he realises Madge isn't there and later tells her that she will be his only true love. Georgia overhears Nick and Paul talking about the bet they made and tells Nick he is disgusting.

Nina Tucker (Delta Goodrem) returns to Erinsborough and keeps a low profile, meeting with Lou Carpenter (Tom Oliver) and Susan, when she reveals that she and Jack Scully (Jay Ryan) have separated. To avoid being noticed, Nina works as a cleaning maid at Lassiter's. Matt is angered when he sees Lauren confiding in Brad and Matt kisses Sharon Canning (Natasha Herbert), but is caught by Terese Willis (Rebekah Elmaloglou). Matt hides the truth from Lauren. Paul invites Des Clarke (Paul Keane) back to Erinsborough and they talk about Des' failed marriage to Lorraine Kingham (Antoinette Byron) in front of Daniel to get him to back down from his wedding. Paul then tells Amber that Imogen is in love with Daniel, before Imogen quits her role as maid of honour. Tom Ramsay (Gary Files) sees Imogen holding Daniel's present to Amber, a photo of Agnes Robinson. Tom explains that Agnes threw her pearl ring down an old well when her husband, Frederick Ramsay, did not return from war. Daniel learns that Imogen is at The Waterhole and goes to find her, before getting in her car and driving off together to talk. Paige sees them and thinks that they are running away together, so tells Amber. Guy Carpenter (Andrew Williams) arrives for the wedding. Harold ends up attending the wedding and tells Susan that he has been imagining Madge, but she has not been showing lately. Daniel begs Imogen to come to the wedding and she admits that she is in love with him and tells him the story of the ring. Daniel goes down the well with Imogen to find it, but when they don't find anything, they decide to climb out. The ladder breaks on them and they become stuck.

=== Aftermath ===
In the aftermath, Amber tells everyone in the Church that the wedding is cancelled. Paul spots Nina at The Waterhole and asks her to perform the closing act of the festival, but she declines, so Karl pretends his throat is sore to get Nina to perform, which works. Nina then gets an apology text from Jack. Josh keeps an upset Amber company in her hotel room and they have sex. Sky Mangel (Stephanie McIntosh) calls Harold and invites him to move in with her. He agrees and Madge tells him that she will be staying in Erinsborough. Harold says goodbye to Susan, Karl, Lou and Toadie, before leaving and waving goodbye to Madge. Nick edits Paul's blood test results to trick him into believing he has cancer. In the well, Imogen finds Agnes' pearl ring. Naomi and Lucy Robinson (Melissa Bell) find and give Bouncer 2 the dog to Paul as a gift. Kyle diverts water down the well and Josh overhears Imogen yelling, so stops the water and rescues her and Daniel. When Brad discovers Matt's affair with Sharon, he confronts Matt on the side of the road and Matt is hit by a driver. He loses too much blood and dies in hospital.

== Cast appearances ==
=== Regular cast ===
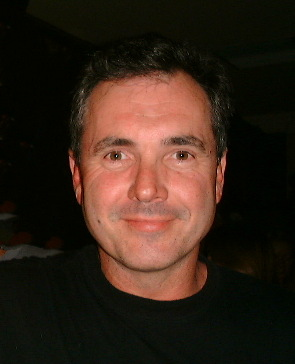
Alan Fletcher

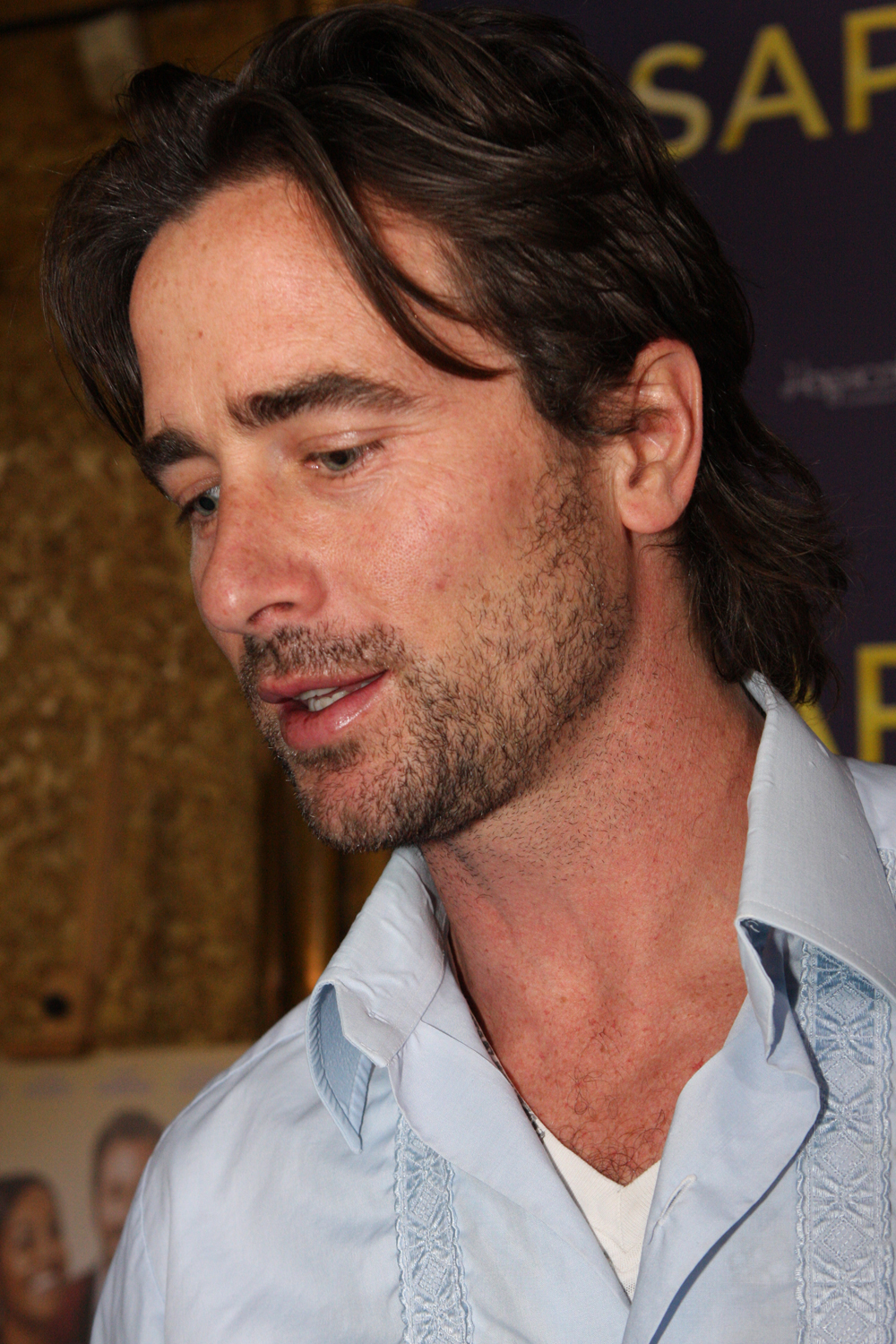
Kip Gamblin

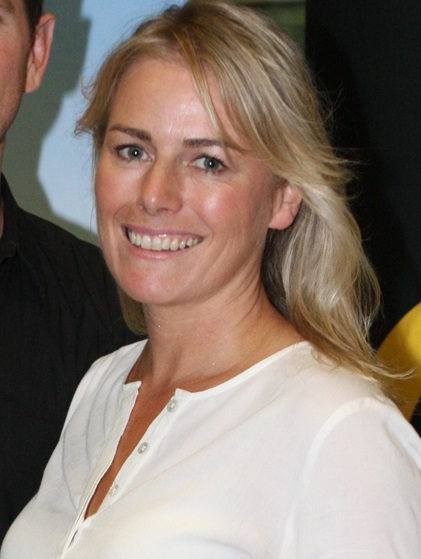
Kate Kendall

- Ryan Moloney as Toadie Rebecchi
- Rebekah Elmaloglou as Terese Willis
- Kip Gamblin as Brad Willis
- Harley Bonner as Josh Willis
- Ariel Kaplan as Imogen Willis
- Olympia Valance as Paige Smith
- Kate Kendall as Lauren Turner
- Jenna Rosenow as Amber Turner
- Josef Brown as Matt Turner
- Calen Mackenzie as Bailey Turner
- Tom Oliver as Lou Carpenter
- Tim Phillipps as Daniel Robinson
- Stefan Dennis as Paul Robinson
- Morgana O'Reilly as Naomi Canning
- Colette Mann as Sheila Canning
- Chris Milligan as Kyle Canning
- Saskia Hampele as Georgia Brooks
- Scott McGregor as Mark Brennan
- James Mason as Chris Pappas
- Meyne Wyatt as Nate Kinski
- Jackie Woodburne as Susan Kennedy
- Alan Fletcher as Karl Kennedy

=== Guest cast ===
- Anne Scott-Pendlebury as Hilary Robinson (Note: Appears before the two week celebrations, but still billed as a returning character.)
- Ian Smith as Harold Bishop
- Anne Charleston as Madge Bishop
- Scott Major as Lucas Fitzgerald
- Alin Sumarwata as Vanessa Villante
- Izabella Anderson as Sebastiana
- Travis Burns as Tyler Brennan
- Damien Fotiou as Nick Petrides
- Steven Sammut as Joey Dimato
- David Serafin as Dennis Dimato
- Steve Carroll as Ian McKay
- Nell Feeney as Janelle Timmins
- Matt Preston as himself
- Natasha Herbert as Sharon Canning
- Delta Goodrem as Nina Tucker
- Paul Keane as Des Clarke
- Andrew Williams as Guy Carpenter
- Gary Files as Tom Ramsay
- John Lidgerwood as Driver
- Stephanie McIntosh as Sky Mangel (Note: Appears after the two week celebrations, but still billed as a returning character.)
- Melissa Bell as Lucy Robinson
- Uncredited as Bouncer 2 (Note: Appears after the two week celebrations, but still billed as part of the anniversary.)

== Production ==
=== Development ===
The 30th anniversary and its storylines were conceived over a year in advance by the serial's executive producer, Jason Herbison. At the beginning of 2015, the Neighbours title card and theme song were revamped in a new "retro-inspired" style for the anniversary. Herbison told Daniel Kilkelly of Digital Spy that his "main aim" for the celebrations were "to celebrate the past, present and the future of the show in a way that would be satisfying for our viewers." He also explained that he wanted to be weary of how each plot was planned out to not interrupt or spoil any storylines for the United Kingdom, which was airing episodes two weeks behind Australia. Herbison and production staff were hoping to create a "dash of nostalgia" by returning former cast members, however also wanted to bring current storylines to a climax. He admitted that the crew also wanted the anniversary to lead into some more longer storylines. Neighbours invited many cast members back from all eras of the serial and Herbison explained that he was thrilled with the characters who were brought back, all of whom had "natural reasons" for returning. All stories were written by Herbison and the storylining team following their pitch to the Neighbours broadcasters, who all "gave great ideas and feedback". Herbison described the anniversary as full of "drama, action, humour, romance, nostalgia and of course a little heartbreak" and teased, "You name it, we have every spectrum of emotion covered for the 30th with a lot of twists and turns with the stories, and many surprises."

Kilkelly branded the anniversary as weeks of unmissable storylines. Fletcher believed the Erinsborough festival set at Lassiter's Lake looked amazing, while Herbison admitted that his favourite part of the celebrations was the Harold crash scene, explaining, "I love the opening of the festival and Harold's van crash." He explained that the idea of the crash had been in his mind for a while and praised director Tony Osicka for bringing it to life "in a spectacular way". Daniel and Amber prepare to marry, but do not have the support of their family and friends, while Amber's bridesmaid, Imogen (Kaplan), has feelings for Daniel, and Amber's ex-boyfriend, Josh (Bonner), is still in love with Amber. Herbison admitted that he thought that "Amber and Daniel are far too young to be getting married". Phillipps did not think that Daniel and Amber were suited to each other, but was glad to be a central figure of the 30th anniversary. He stated that a relationship that started similar to theirs was destined to fail. Phillipps explained that the wedding was rushed because "the producers wanted it to suit the timing of the 30th and so they had to accelerate that for us and we just had to play it" and that the ideal timing for Daniel and Amber's wedding would have been in a year.

To surprise Amber with it, Daniel and Imogen go down a well on the day of the wedding to find a ring that unseen characters Frederick Ramsay and Agnes Robinson threw down. Digital Spy teased, "Unfortunately, this revelation soon leads to disaster when Daniel goes in search of the ring on his wedding day with help from Imogen and they both get trapped down the well, leaving an oblivious Amber standing at the altar..." Prior to them getting stuck, Imogen reveals that she has feelings for Daniel, who tries to forget about it "in true Daniel fashion" and continues on his way to find the pearl. Kyle Canning (Chris Milligan), unbeknownst to the fact that Daniel and Imogen are trapped inside, turns the water pipes on and begins flooding the well, leaving Daniel and Imogen submerged in water, until they are rescued. Daniel misses his wedding and Amber is "left assuming that Daniel and Imogen have run off together." She and Josh then have sex with each other, leaving Amber pregnant.

Another storyline is the returns of Harold and Madge Bishop. Madge appears as a figment of Harold's imagination, who "comes back to help Harold move on with his life". Smith and Charleston were contacted by producers and asked to return in August 2014. The storyline was thought of and pitched to producers by Jackie Woodburne. Herbison explained that he was worried that Smith and Charleston would not be happy with their character's return storyline and told Kilkelly that he was quite nervous during the original storyline pitch meeting, despite having known them for years. Smith and Charleston "loved" the plot however, and Herbison "figured most fans would simply be happy to see them together again." Before hearing the pitch, Smith thought that Madge's return storyline would be "one of those American arising from the dead" plots, but admitted that he applauded the idea and thought it had been cleverly handled once he heard it. Harold begins smelling Madge's perfume and hearing her voice as he reminisces of their marriage. After having smelt Madge's perfume and hearing her voice, a "completely disorientated Harold Bishop is driving his campervan" and accidentally plunges through a fruit and vegetable stall and hits a water hydrant, before imagining Madge sitting next to him, with "In the Hall of the Mountain King" playing over the footage. Fletcher said, "It's a disaster!" Madge continues appearing to Harold as a vision. Charleston hoped Madge's return to the serial would be a counter to the "turgidness" of her "really sad" death in 2001.

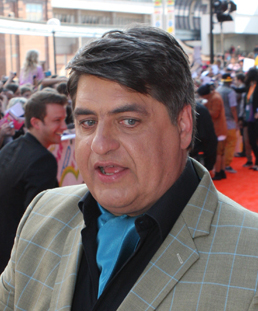
Matt Preston appeared as the judge of the Erinsborough bake-off.

A subplot of the 30th anniversary celebrations is the Erinsborough bake-off competition, which sees MasterChef Australia host and chef Matt Preston be the judge. Sheila Canning (Mann) does some "serious flirting" with him, which Mann hoped did not ruin Preston's experience on the show. Janelle Timmins (Feeney) returns as part of the bake-off and develops a feud with Sheila and Susan over whose cake is better tasting, which brings out their competitive sides. Des Clarke's (Keane) return storyline was dubbed a flashback for him by Keane and sees Paul trying to manipulate him by talking about his marriage with Daphne Clarke (Elaine Smith) to throw off Daniel and Amber's wedding. Dennis believed that it was "really great to reintroduce" Des and use the storyline as a viable excuse to honour the past. A plotline that aired towards the end of the celebrations was the reignition of Nina Tucker's (Goodrem) relationship with Jack Scully, who has separated from her after dating for 10 years, which inspires her to write and sing her new song. Goodrem explained that Nina soon learns that Jack wants to try dating her again. Major and Sumarwata's homecoming as Lucas and Vanessa allowed for the introduction of their second child, Sebsastiana, and progressed their family unit as it is revealed Vanessa is pregnant again. Kilkelly labelled them as "Erinsborough's most fertile couple".

In the days following the two-week-long celebrations, it was teased "a tragic accident" would occur. It was confirmed a character would be killed off after being hit by a car, however the victim was originally left secret. It was later announced that Matt Turner (Josef Brown) would be getting killed off. Herbison said of killing off a character, "We never make these decisions lightly and we always miss the cast member." He added that Matt's death provided lots of great storyline material for the future. Herbison also teased a cancer story for Paul, noting, "This will play out over a period of time and will see Paul at his most vulnerable. He'll make some big, irreversible decisions which will have a big bearing on his future." When asked about further appearances from guest characters, Herbison explained that the crew had intentionally "settled cousin Hilary in a nursing home nearby" and said that she would make more appearances. To pay homage to the serial's most famous dog, Bouncer, the crew introduced Bouncer 2, which Herbison described as "a nice nod to history". He explained of Bouncer 2's origins, "Bouncer had a few notable affairs when he was on the show so we are not exactly sure who he knocked up, but Bouncer 2 is definitely a direct descendent."

=== Cast ===
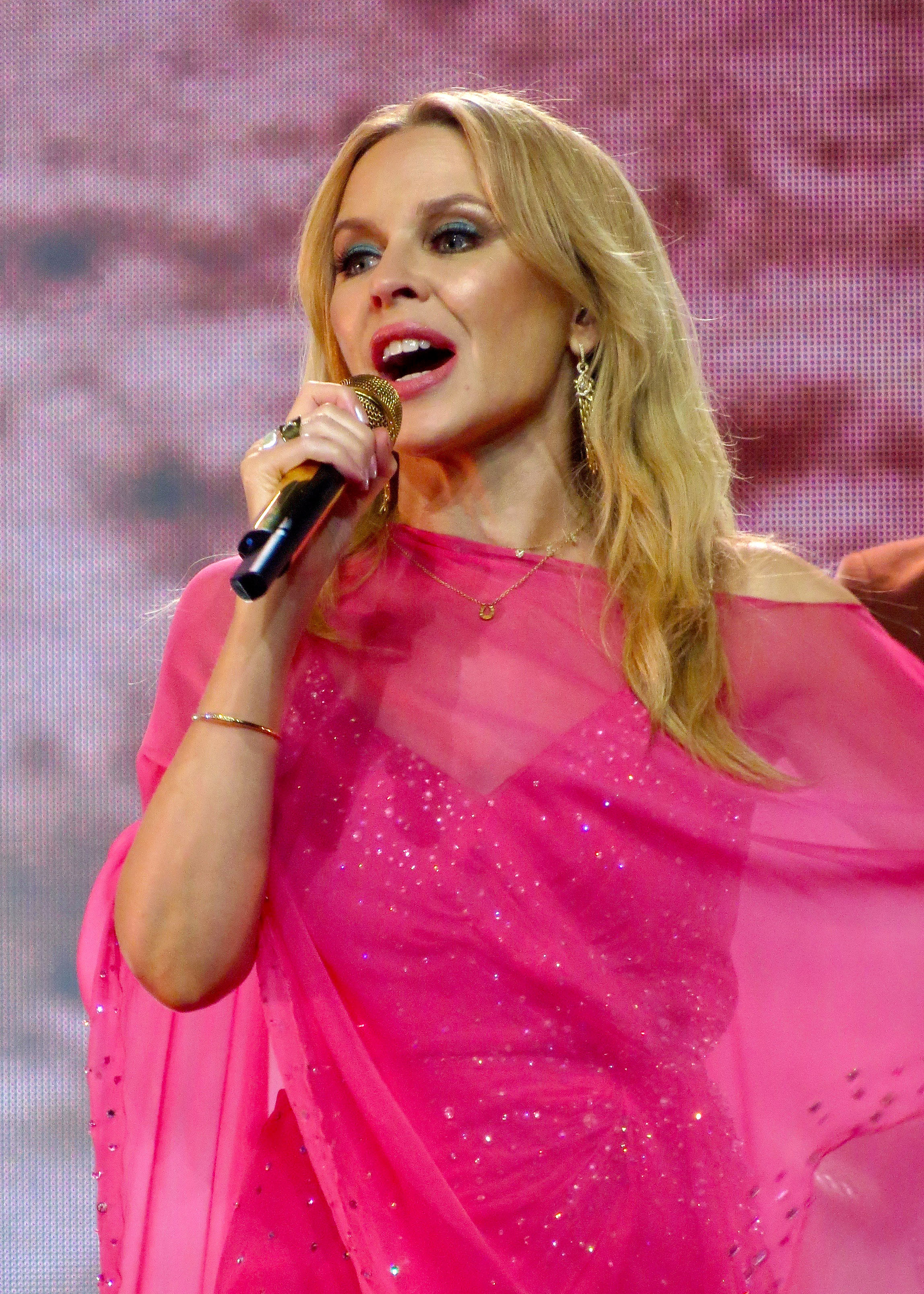
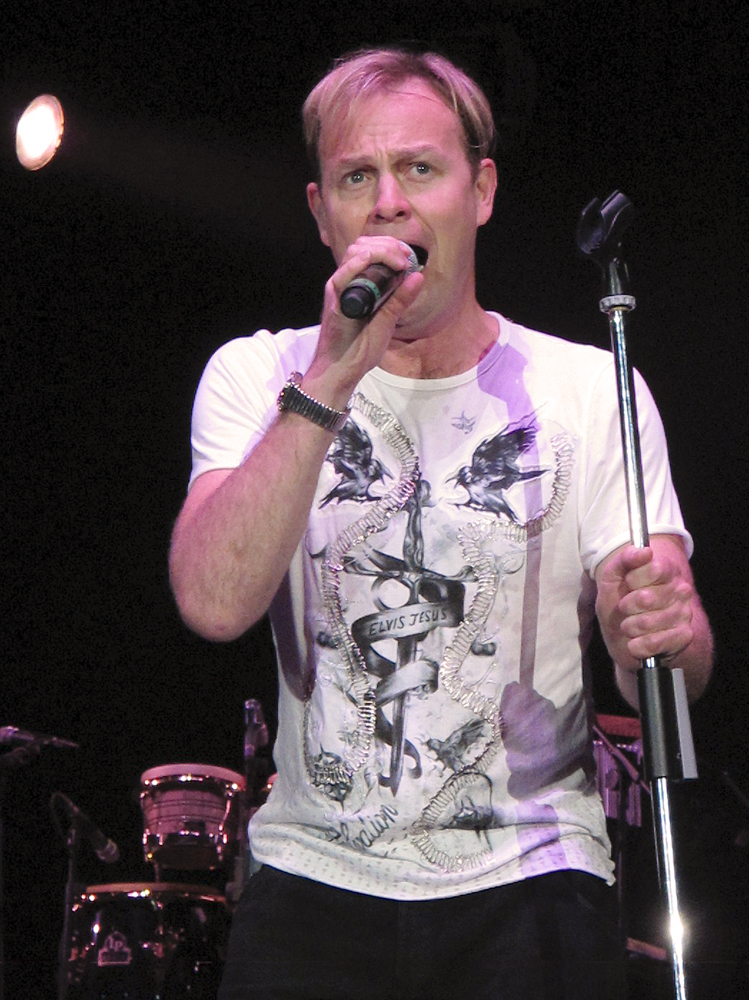
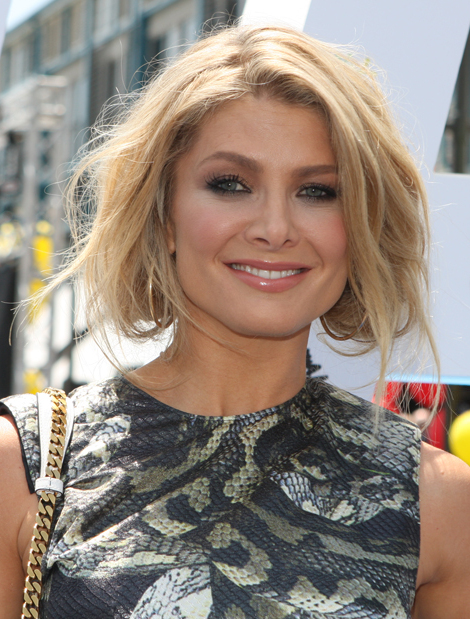
Kylie Minogue, Jason Donovan and Natalie Bassingthwaighte all declined the offer to return for the anniversary.

Herbison revealed that the show was wishing for Kylie Minogue (who played Charlene Robinson) and Jason Donovan (who played Scott Robinson) to return, but both declined the offer. Both agreed to star in Neighbours 30th: The Stars Reunite, a documentary on the successes of the serial. Rumours that the pair were returning circulated social media in August 2014 and a Neighbours spokesperson said, "We don't comment on speculation." Anne Charleston further stated that "I think Kylie is on board for the special and I imagine everyone will be in on it because it's a big occasion." Further speculation by fans occurred when Minogue posted an image of new jean overalls she bought, something Charlene would wear during her stint. Minogue later said on The Graham Norton Show, "I didn't want to come back for Neighbours' 30th anniversary! I felt Charlene existed then and that I'd probably let her down." Natalie Bassingthwaighte was also asked to return as Izzy Hoyland, but declined due to bad timing. Ultimately, Hilary Robinson (Pendelbury), Harold Bishop (Smith), Madge Bishop (Charleston), Lucas Fitzgerald (Major), Vanessa Villante (Sumarwata), Janelle Timmins (Feeney), Guy Carpenter (Williams), Des Clarke (Keane), Tom Ramsay (Files), Nina Tucker (Goodrem), Lucy Robinson (Bell) and Sky Mangel (McIntosh) were all brought back for the celebrations.

The first of the confirmed returnees were Smith, who played Harold Bishop, and Charleston, who played Madge Bishop, a character previously killed off in 2001. Both were invited back to the serial for its 30th anniversary. Their returns were announced in November 2014. Charleston told Digital Spy that she immediately agreed to return and would not have liked to miss it. Smith said that he was excited to be working again with the cast and crew. Smith admitted that he needed to return to his comfort zone after years of retirement. Charleston explained that she had "a lot of fun" working with Oliver and Smith again, adding that it felt as though nothing had changed. In a behind-the-scenes video, Charleston confirmed that Madge's personality would remain the same as it was before her death. Charleston remarked that the thing that had changed the most about Neighbours was that cast and crew received free morning tea and lunch.

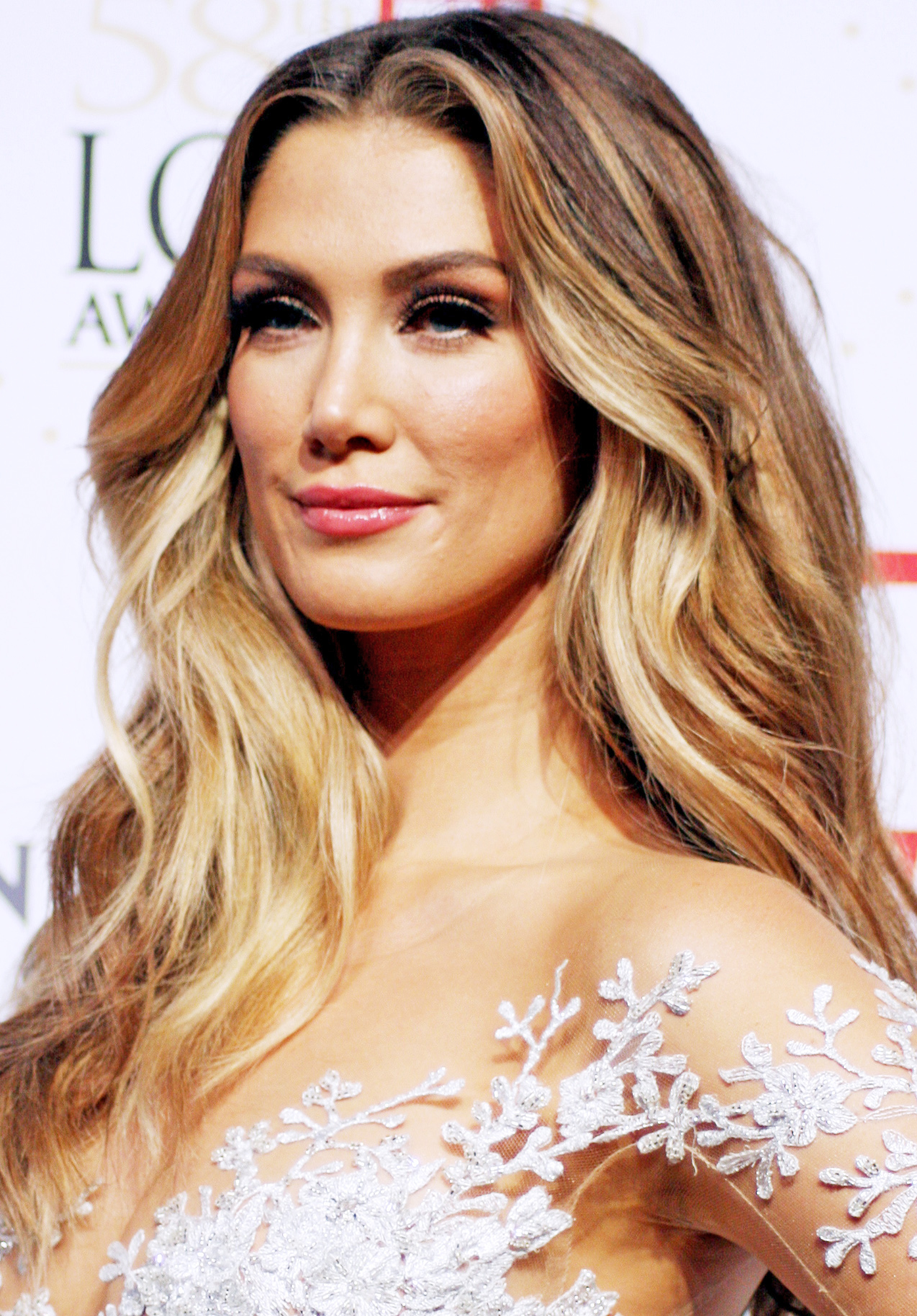
Delta Goodrem's return to the serial featured her singing her single "Only Human".

Singer Goodrem was confirmed a returnee on 25 November 2014, days following Charleston and Smith's announced return. Goodrem publicised her reprisal of Nina Tucker herself via posts on Twitter and Instagram, one of which read, "I am so excited to be making a guest appearance as my character Nina for Neighbours special 30th anniversary." Herbison said of production's decision to bring her back, "It's only natural that music would somehow be involved. Having Delta join us for this momentous occasion is the icing on the cake, we are delighted." He later called her return sweet and announced that her new song, "Only Human", would be sung "especially" for Neighbours on-screen. Goodrem felt "very very blessed" to be back. Nina performs as the closing act of the Erinsborough festival.

Television personality Matt Preston was invited to cameo as a celebrity guest for the anniversary. Preston admitted that he had been waiting seven years to be on Neighbours and it was third on his bucket list, with his other two aspirations to be on Rove and to win a Logie. He called his other two wishes "easy compared to getting on this show" and said that being on Neighbours was a dream of his. He admitted that before filming, he found the prospect of acting very terrifying. Nell Feeney, who previously played Janelle Timmins, was also invited by producers to return to the show with a "warm welcome". Fletcher said that inviting Feeney back to the cast was a pleasure. Feeney confirmed to viewers that Janelle was still married to Allan Steiger (Joe Clements) and that they are now living in Cairns. Fletcher said that seeing Feeney on set made him smile.

Character Tom Ramsay (Files) comes back to Erinsborough after a twenty-year absence. Tom returns for his grand-nephew Daniel's wedding, but Files thought that his character's return "came out of nowhere", however was still grateful for the invite back. Files' laughed at the script's excuse for Tom's return, being he flew down after being at a nearby plumbing factory. Of returning, Files said that being back on the set felt similar, but also different, and he noted that he recognised much of the crew. Returnee Paul Keane, playing original character Des Clarke, compared returning to the serial with sliding into an old pair of slippers and called the experience "weird, but great, different, but the same". Dennis called Keane's return a blast from the past and the two were reunited after 22 years apart. Keane joked that the 30-year anniversary made him feel old. Herbison thought that having Des back was "pretty legendary".

=== Filming ===
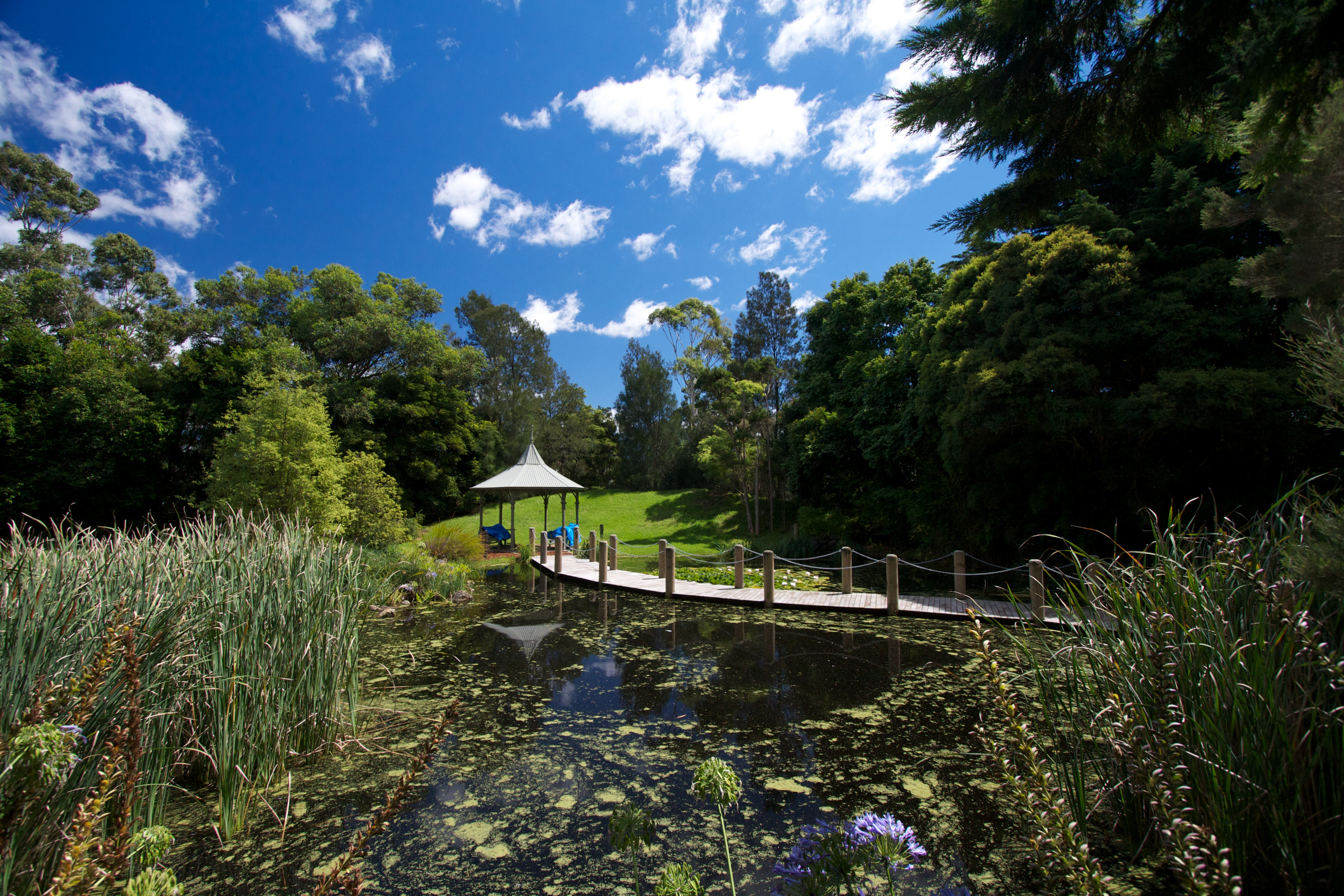
Harold crashes his campervan by Lassiter's Lake, a scene that required seven stuntmen, an additional cameraman and over 70 extras.

Filming commenced in November 2014. Mann revealed that she was unaware of her first scene with Harold Bishop and explained that director Tony Osicka told her it was going to be a pick-up scene from two weeks back instead. This was done to cover up Smith's return to the serial. On the first day of filming the Erinsborough festival, when Harold drives into a fruit and vegetable stall, an additional cameraman was required for the shooting. Over 70 extras were also brought in and the serial required extended crew for the filming. The first episode of the celebrations, episode 7073, featured almost 20 regular cast members, which Mason called "full on, but awesome". Seven stuntmen were incorporated into the Harold crash scene, including an Ian Smith double-up.

Scenes at the Church where Amber is left at the altar were filmed at St Mary's Church, an on-location site. Valance was very excited for the shoot as it was her first scenes away from the Neighbours studio. Dennis explained how he brought books with him to the location to keep him occupied, explaining, "What we do on busy filming days is read books because I learnt a long time ago, when you're filming on location, doing a wedding, there's a lot of sitting around time, hence the book." A scene containing Amber walking down the aisle with her bouquet to find Daniel absent was rehearsed numerous times. Valance called it "one of the longest scenes I think I've done on Neighbours so far." A special shot to capture a close-up of Rosenow's face while walking down the aisle was set up and had a rig strapped around her body, with a pole and camera attached, dangling in front of her face to create a sense of tightness. Valance said that she was excited to see it on screen.

Scenes with Daniel and Imogen stuck in the well were shot in studio in a special small set built by the art department. Most scenes were filmed with only three walls, but Kaplan revealed that some scenes had the fourth wall added to enclose herself and Phillipps in. She thought the set looked amazing and realistic, adding that scenes were filmed with the lights turned off, which gave a sense of claustrophobia. Before each shoot, the walls were also sprayed with water to make the well look as though it was leaking. Lights were also positioned above the hole in the roof where the well entrance would be to make it look like natural light was shining through. Phillipps called it "cool as it felt as if you were in this really small space." Kaplan worked with a Daniel stunt double for a shot where the ladder breaks and Imogen falls into Daniel's arms. The scenes were directed by Scott Major, who was "hands-on" and ensured that the actors knew where their characters "were at emotionally". Phillipps felt that filming scenes in the well contributed to the big and important wedding plot.

The scene that sees Matt get hit by a car contains Matt pushing Brad to the curb as a car approaches. Mattresses were placed down to secure a soft landing and over fifteen shots had to be taken to get the push correct. Brown explained in a behind-the-scenes video that he had a microphone strapped around his ankle to capture the audio of Brad falling to the ground. A stunt double was brought in to film the shot that has Matt hit by a car. Herbison called the crash scene and the scenes following "powerhouse performances".

== Promotion and broadcast ==
In March 2015, Herbison first teased to the Irish Independent that the serial would be marking the anniversary in a big way. Two 20-second-long trailers focusing on the return of Harold were broadcast on Australian screens by Network 10 in the lead-up to the 30th anniversary. Two promotional trailers for the anniversary were also released by Channel 5 in the United Kingdom. The first trailer prominently revolved around Daniel and Amber's wedding. A private shoot with Philipps was filmed during his publicity visit to the UK. The second trailer featured unseen footage from neither Australia nor the UK, teasing Matt's road accident, Amber's surprise pregnancy and Paul's cancer diagnosis. This trailer was 90 seconds and aired following the first screening of Neighbours 30th: The Stars Reunite.

Additionally, the Neighbours YouTube channel uploaded 12 behind-the-scenes videos containing spoilers for the plots of the anniversary and cast interviews. Neighbours also released a promotional picture featuring all the regular cast members dressed up in suits with a large "30" centred in the middle of the screen. More photos of characters involved in Daniel and Amber's wedding storyline were taken outside St Mary's Church. Woodburne later revealed that promotion development had been going on since August 2014, calling it a "very long time".

Australia Post released a Neighbours stamp series on 24 February 2015, prior to the broadcast of the first celebration episode. Three sheets worth of stamps priced 70¢ each were put up for sale for a limited amount of time, with each stamp containing photos of past and present Neighbours cast members to celebrate and advertise the anniversary. The stamps were available via shipping for British fans and costed $22.95. It was revealed that Australia Post and FremantleMedia, the producer of Neighbours, had purposely collaborated in making the stickers. The Neighbours cast was not told about them until their release and Fletcher described feeling honoured to see himself on a stamp. Michael Zsolt, the Philatelic Manager for Australia Post explained, "We trust that the public and especially Neighbours enthusiasts will jump at the opportunity to collect the stamp pack. The trifold stamp pack is a great gift and a highly collectable memento in this 30th anniversary year." Rick Maier of Network 10 said that the show was delighted to see the anniversary promoted in this way.

The two-week-long anniversary began airing on 4 March 2015 in Australia. Episodes had been broadcasting two weeks late in the UK at the time, which caused the storyline to be delayed and begin on 18 March in the UK. At the end of each episode, white text was added above the guest credits that read, "Thank you to 30 years of Neighbours cast members". On 18 March, Channel 5 aired Neighbours 30th: The Stars Reunite at 10:30 pm, followed by a repeat of episode 523, Scott and Charlene's wedding.

== Reception ==
=== Hype and anticipation ===
Rachel Ward of the Irish Independent expressed her anticipation for the anniversary by saying, "Today, the show that gave us Kylie and Jason, Mrs Mangel and Plain Jane Superbrain, celebrates a remarkable 30 years on air. Derided by some for its focus on 'everyday' concerns (storylines often revolve around dramas such as lost homework, stolen kisses and rows with parents), the soap has nevertheless become a staple of TV, beloved by students, housewives and malingerers." Bridget McManus of The Sydney Morning Herald was excited for Smith's return to the serial for the celebrations. David Dale of the same publication claimed that Neighbours had "much to celebrate" in its 30th year. A writer from televisionau.com promoted the anniversary by publishing, "Today, more than 7000 episodes on, it clocks up its 30th anniversary. Its audience numbers are not what they once were but the show continues to earn its place in Australian and British popular culture. Neighbours has commemorated its 30th milestone with former cast members returning — including Paul Keane who played the jilted fiancé in the first episode."

Digital Spy's Alex Fletcher compiled a list of characters he wanted to see return for the anniversary in August 2014. He began, "In early 2015, Neighbours will celebrate its 30th anniversary. The Aussie soap has provided us with nearly 7,000 episodes of drama, laughs and Harold Bishop falling off a clifftop and returning five years later as a bloke called Ted. With preparations already underway for the 30th celebrations and the possible return of Kylie Minogue – the show's most famous breakout star – being teased, we want to find out who else you would like to see back in Ramsay Street to celebrate the show's birthday." His list included Izzy Hoyland, Annalise Hartman (Kimberley Davies), Billy Kennedy (Jesse Spencer), Dee Bliss (Madeleine West), Lance Wilkinson (Andrew Bibby) and Elle Robinson (Pippa Black), none of whom made returns.

In the lead-up to the airing of episode 7073, Now To Love plugged, "As the saying goes, everybody needs good neighbours. And we are all in good company as the stars of iconic Australian drama series Neighbours return to celebrate the show turning 30!" They, along with Honey, commemorated the serial with lists of the Hollywood actors who made their debut on Neighbours. Clem Bastow from The Guardian featured an article on the successes of Neighbours to celebrate its 30th anniversary. Bastow stated that Neighbours was a "sunshine fantasy Australia" who "spoke to the national psyche – and gripped the world". MamaMia also published a list of notable actors who originate from the serial in an article prior to the release of episode 7073. They also included a list of top ten "most memorable" moments from the serial. A writer from the outlet promoted the anniversary by saying, "Neighbours turns 30 this week. That's right, it's been three decades since the Aussie drama's humble beginnings as a Channel Seven soapie. Today the show, which moved to Channel Ten in 1986, is one of just three shows in the Logies Hall of Fame. It's also Australia's longest running drama series, bringing with it an impressively long list of former cast members who have made it big in Hollywood or right here at home."

=== Ratings ===
The opening episode of the anniversary on 4 March 2015 was watched by 244,000 people in metro Australia, but failed to make the top 20 programmes watched for the evening. Ratings dropped to 207,000 viewers for the following episode, broadcast on 5 March 2015. In the UK, the first episode of the anniversary, episode 7073, was watched by 3.12 million people, making it the third most-watched programme on Channel 5 for the week and the fifteenth most watched programme in the UK for the week. The next two episodes were watched by 6.37 million people. Episodes 7076 to 7081, which were broadcast from 23 to 27 March 2015, had a total viewership of 7.75 million. This placed Neighbours as the week's most-watched programme on Channel 5 and one of the most-watched in the UK. The final three episodes of the celebrations were watched by 5.16 million people in the UK, with the following episode which aired after anniversary's climax to Daniel and Amber's wedding, episode 7083, reaching a total of 1.74 million viewers.

=== Critical response ===
The creator of the serial, Reg Watson, said upon the anniversary that he was "very proud but also grateful to so many hundreds of talented people who worked to make the serial a success." Charleston believed the anniversary was very important and thought that the serial would not be cancelled due to the hype created from the celebrations. She added that all the returnees and the sense of the anniversary was "all rather lovely". Craig McLachlan revealed in June 2015 that he unsuccessfully tried to reprise his role of Henry Ramsay for the anniversary. The Neighbours cast presented the crew with a Neighbours–themed birthday cake. Two parties for the current and former cast members were thrown in honour of the anniversary, one by Channel 5 at the Café de Paris in London on 17 March 2015, and another by Network 10 in Australia on 26 March 2015. EastEnders actor Adam Woodyatt released a tribute to Neighbours with Donovan on behalf of EastEnders, wishing Neighbours a "very happy birthday".

Kilkelly criticised the fact that Donovan and Minogue did not reprise their roles, calling out that "Daniel and Amber's wedding may have some notable relatives missing – not least Scott and Charlene!" He also felt that Madge's return storyline initially sounded "like a plot better suited to online spinoff Neighbours vs Zombies." He stated that "Fans are in for a treat as she sticks around for a number of episodes" and called the plot unique. He also praised the show's production and said, "show bosses have gone all-out". He dubbed Madge's return a shock reappearance, and added that he thought the show's 30th anniversary had been properly celebrated in style. An RTÉ fan poll rated episode 7073 the all-time third best episode of Neighbours, with a writer from the outlet saying that the Erinsborough festival began in "spectacular fashion".

For The Age, McManus praised the serial for reaching 30 years' worth of episodes, which she branded "an incredible feat". She congratulated, "The army of people who each week make six-and-a-half hours of Australia's longest-running television program, Neighbours, scurry up and down corridors, pace green rooms and bustle about a polystyrene well in which star-crossed lovers Imogen and Daniel have fallen on their way to Daniel's wedding to someone else." The Guardian's Jazz Twemlow said that the anniversary weeks were "typical Erinsborough fare" and the familiarality of the old cast made it "all quite comforting". He added that Neighbours has improved "simply by staying true to itself" over the years. Ryno's TV called the celebrations the "most anticipated" weeks of Neighbours. The outlet believed that the "heart of the anniversary" and the serial's "big drawcard" was the awaited wedding of Daniel and Amber. Speaking of production's way of honouring the past and present, the outlet said, "The show manages to continue current storylines, and incorporate nostalgia, which enables old fans to jump back into the show and get hooked again, and keeps new fans from getting lost with the trips down memory lane." Before rating the anniversary five out five stars, they summarised for British viewers, "Fans are truly in for the best week the show has produced in quite some time, as it celebrates a milestone it should be proud to have reached and it shows that it is."

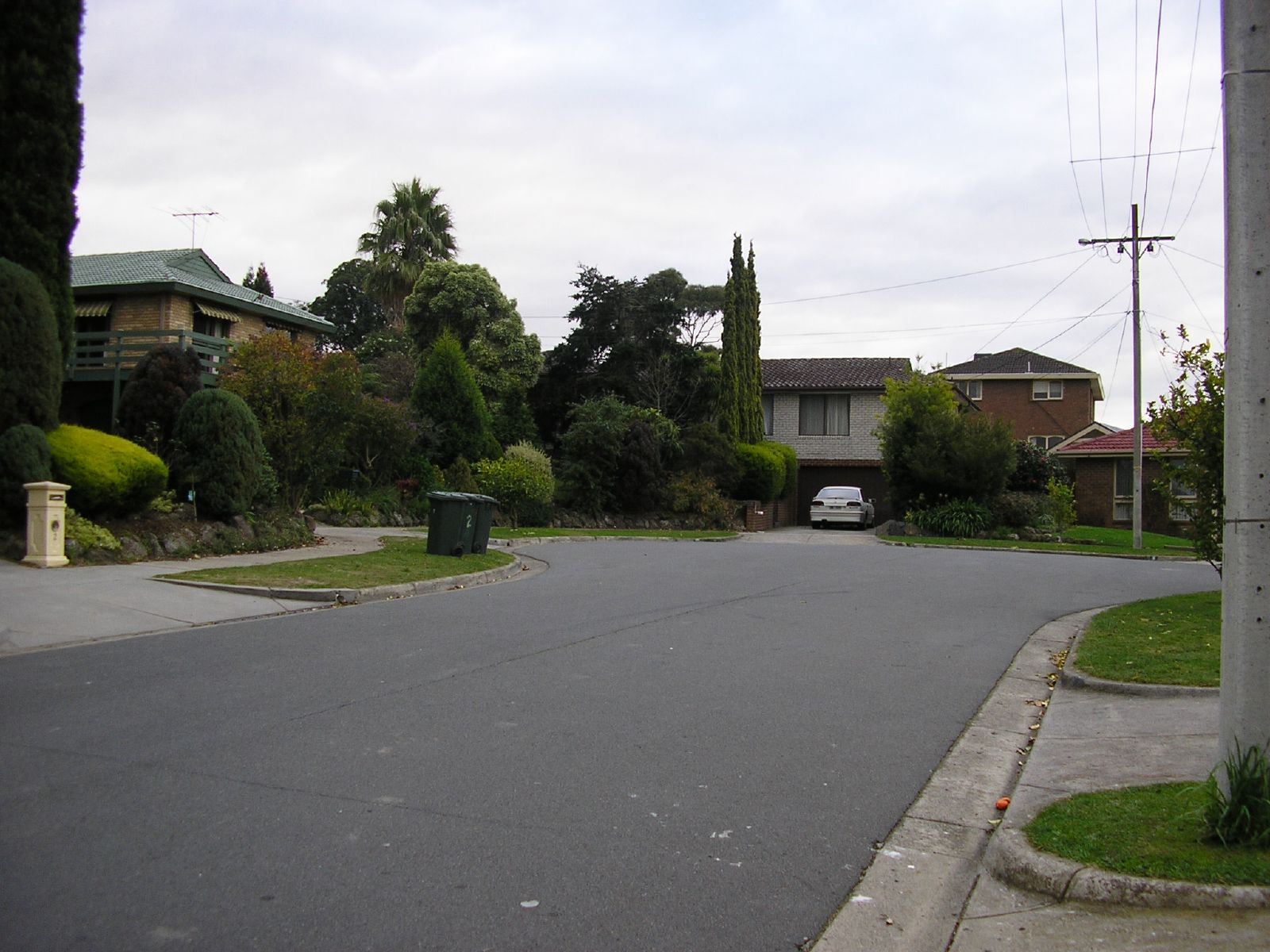
Critics were disappointed with the lack of screentime for Ramsay Street in episode 7073.

Rosie Waterland of MamaMia criticised the fact that returning viewers were unable to identify most of the newer cast, saying "It's the opening credits and already I recognise no one. Who are all these people? And why does everyone look like a Cotton On model?" She added that the newer cast made her feel as though Neighbours was a "strange new universe". Upon seeing Mark Brennan with an unbuttoned shirt, she called the serial more "risqué" than it used it be. She also said that Brennan's pacing was McGregor's "nervous acting" and said that Rosenow was doing "lots of sad acting, including sighing and looking down at the ground." Waterland lambasted that only one Ramsay Street house was seen a few times. She concluded, "Holy Oprah, I'm exhausted. And apparently tomorrow night Sad Bridesmaid who just resigned will be [sic] become Happy Bridesmaid because she and the groom are going to run off together. I really want to see that, but I don't know if I can handle more of this complicated wedding inception emotional roller coaster."

Ethan Sills of The Spin Off said that Harold's camper van crash "mildly" inconvenienced the festival "for about five minutes". He thought Madge's return had Madge "scolded him from the passenger's seat, while the rest of the cast did their best shocked faces. No explosions. No murders. No dramatic revelations. And that's just the way Neighbours likes it." He called the anniversary a "pinnacle moment" for the serial and claimed it "dominated the first few months of the year". Sills thought the highlight of the anniversary was Goodrem's return, but he dubbed it a "publicity stunt" and "less in celebration of the soap's anniversary and more to plug her latest song." He also claimed that the returnees were of "random selection" and had "shoehorned cameos". He criticised the short return storylines written for characters, whilst calling Sky's appearance "so brief and awkward". Sills called the well storyline an "old classic" plotline and said, "It's not exactly a glowing sign of Neighbours modernity."

Digital Spy's Soap Spy columnist, Ryan Love, a returning viewer, explained that the returning characters were what intrigued old viewers back to watch the celebrations. Seeing Paul as the mayor got him immediately "hooked", but he admitted that he required research to familiarise himself with the off-screen "happy ending" of Lucas and Vanessa. He applauded the use of "In the Hall of the Mountain King" playing over Harold's crash scene and thought Madge's "exceptional" appearance helped the scene become more "amusingly brilliant". He stated that production reunited Harold and Madge "so poignantly". Paul's "scheming", "Psychic Susan", and Mark and Tyler made him feel as though he could see himself "settling back in on Ramsay Street".
