= Old Fashioned Christmas =

Single by Anne Charleston and Ian Smith
- B-side: "Old Fashioned Christmas (Singalong version)"
- Released: December 1989
- Genre: Christmas, pop
- Length: 3:15
- Label: Jive Records
- Songwriter: Phil Hampson
- Producers: Phil Hampson; Brandon Leon

"'Old Fashioned Christmas" is a Christmas song by Australian actors Anne Charleston and Ian Smith, who are known for their roles as Madge Bishop and Harold Bishop on the television soap opera Neighbours. The song was especially written for the duo by Phil Hampson and co-produced by Hampson and Brandon Leon. Both actors were apprehensive about recording a song, but they agreed to do it after falling in love with the track. Charleston was also hesitant because she had damaged her voice some years prior after performing with laryngitis. She and Smith recorded their vocals in Melbourne, while the music was recorded in Manchester, England. "Old Fashioned Christmas" was released via Jive Records in the United Kingdom on 7" vinyl in December 1989.

Charleston and Smith promoted the single while they were appearing in pantomime in Stockport, making several appearances on British television shows, including This Morning. The song was banned from being played on BBC Radio 1 for being dreary. The music video was filmed in November 1989 in Stanmore. A competition run by Fast Forward magazine to win a role in the video received 10,000 entries. The song received negative reviews from critics. It was called "nauseatingly slushy", and "a sort of poor man's 'Mistletoe and Wine'". Cameron Adams of news.com.au named "Old Fashioned Christmas" as one of "the worst Christmas songs ever". The track peaked at No. 77 on the UK Singles Chart.

== Background and release ==
In August 1989, Ian Wylie of the reported that Charleston and Smith were in talks with writer Phil Hampson about recording "Old Fashioned Christmas", which had been written especially for them. When the offer came through, Charleston did not think it was serious, believing that she and Smith were asked to record the song as a joke, however, they "turned the tables on the producers" when they agreed to do it. Smith also admitted to being "apprehensive" about recording a song, but after some consideration, he realised that both he and Charleston liked "Old Fashioned Christmas" and accepted. He also said that the pair had received "a lot of funny offers" to do things together in the past, but upon hearing the song they "fell in love with it." He described "Old Fashioned Christmas" as a "real sing-a-long."

Writer Hampson stated "When we heard that the Neighbours duo were coming over we immediately wrote them a Christmas song, which they both loved. Luckily they are both excellent singers and the combination works very well." However, Charleston joked that while Smith was a trained singer, she sounded "like Lauren Bacall on a very bad day." Charleston was not sure she would ever be able to record a song due to damaging her voice some years previously by forcing herself to perform in a play while she had laryngitis. The music for "Old Fashioned Christmas" was recorded in Manchester, with Charleston and Smith laying down their vocals in a Melbourne studio in September. In October, an Edinburgh Evening News reporter claimed that no record label bosses wanted the rights to "Old Fashioned Christmas". The following month, Smith admitted that neither he or Charleston had yet to hear the finished mix of the track, but Charleston said that the producers seemed pleased with it.

Charleston and Smith promoted "Old Fashioned Christmas" while they were appearing in a production of the Dick Whittington pantomime in Stockport. They appeared on several British television shows, including Wogan and Blankety Blank. They performed the single on This Morning on 14 December. The song was later banned from being played on BBC Radio 1 for being "too dreary."

The 7" single had a "greetings card"-like sleeve and the B-side was a singalong version of the track. The accompanying music video was filmed on 30 November 1989 at Church House in Stanmore. A competition run by Fast Forward magazine to win a part in the video received 10,000 entries and school pupil Julia Mire's entry was chosen. Mire plays Charleston and Smith's child in the video.

== Critical reception ==
"Old Fashioned Christmas" received mostly negative reviews. Liverpool Echo critic Penny Kiley gave the record a "thumbs down". Kiley bemoaned the track as a crash grab, calling it "typical of the sentimental pseudo-nostalgia that passes for Christmas spirit among marketing men." Kiley said Smith and Charleston "talk their way through (neither attempts to sing) what amounts to a list of Christmas-connotation words", before likening the song to "a sort of poor man's 'Mistletoe and Wine' really." Simon Mayo called the single "nauseatingly slushy".

The Coventry Evening Telegraph's Alastair Law joked "Looking forward to Christmas? You won't be soon (unless you happen to be a turkey) if doddery Neighbours duo Madge and Harold Bishop have their way." Steve Duffy from the South Wales Echo gave the song one star out of five, before stating "not even Chas & Dave would sing this 'round the joanna. Choirs, bells and festive cliche, with Madge croaking Everage-like, a voice only an 80-a-day Marlboro habit could improve".

Christine Alsford and Karl Newman of the Bristol Evening Post quipped "Hot on the heels of Kyle and Jason's singing success came and went the pop sensation of the festive season: Madge and Harold with 'Old Fashioned Christmas'. Their nostalgia for gatherings round the Christmas tree hardly threatened Band Aid II for the Christmas number one slot." Ben Thompson from The Independent thought the single was "probably the beginning of the end" for Neighbours' "pop supremacy".

In 2014, Cameron Adams of news.com.au named "Old Fashioned Christmas" as one of "the worst Christmas songs ever". Adams wrote "What the what! Yes, it's *that* Madge and Harold from Neighbours. This Christmas single from 1989 didn't exactly follow Kylie and Jason up the charts. One quick listen explains why — chin wobbler Harold can hold his own vocally, but Anne Charleston's gravelley singing voice sounds like [sic] Patti and Selma from The Simpsons gargling sand. Didn't they have autotune in 1989?"

== Chart performance ==
"Old Fashioned Christmas" entered the UK Singles Chart on 16 December 1989 at No. 89, before peaking at No. 77 the following week.

== Track listings ==
- UK 7" single

A. "Old Fashioned Christmas" – 3:15
B. "Old Fashioned Christmas (Singalong version)"– 3:15

== Charts ==
Chart (1989)	Peak position
UK Singles (OCC)	77
