= Madge Bishop =

Fictional character from an Australian soap opera

- Neighbours character
- Portrayed by: Anne Charleston
- Duration: 1986–1992, 1996–2001, 2015, 2022
- First appearance: 20 January 1986
- Last appearance: 28 July 2022
- Created by: Reg Watson
- Introduced by: Reg Watson (1986); Stanley Walsh (1996); Jason Herbison (2015)
In-universe information
- Other names: Madge Ramsay; Madge Mitchell
- Occupation: Secretary; Barmaid; Coffee shop owner; Councillor; Grease Monkeys manager; Columnist
- Family: Ramsay
- Father: Dan Ramsay
- Mother: Edna Ramsay
- Brothers: Max Ramsay; Tom Ramsay
- Husband: Fred Mitchell (until 1987); Harold Bishop (1988–2001)
- Sons: Henry Ramsay
- Daughters: Charlene Robinson
- Stepsons: David Bishop
- Stepdaughters: Kerry Bishop
- Grandsons: Daniel Robinson
- Granddaughters: Madison Robinson
- Grandfathers: Jack Ramsay
- Nephews: Shane Ramsay; Danny Ramsay
- Nieces: Gemma Ramsay
- Other relatives: Agnes Adair

Madge Bishop (also Ramsay and Mitchell) is a fictional character from the Australian soap opera Neighbours, played by Anne Charleston. She made her first appearance during the episode broadcast on 20 January 1986. Madge was introduced as the sister of original character Max Ramsay (Francis Bell). She soon becomes the main matriarch of the Ramsay family. Madge arrives with her marriage in tatters, following a brief but passionate affair with Raymond Philips, her son in prison, and her daughter a runaway teen; she rolled up her sleeves and got a job in The Waterhole to support the family as a single mother. She departed on 27 November 1992, before making a return on 7 November 1996. Madge died on 6 April 2001 from terminal pancreatic cancer. Charleston reprised the role for the show's 30th anniversary celebrations from 4 to 20 March 2015, and for the intended finale on 28 July 2022. Charleston returned as a different character, Agnes Adair, in 2025.

== Casting ==
Actress Anne Charleston was appearing in the television series Possession when she auditioned for Madge. A few days later, she received a phone call to say she had won the role. Her casting was publicised in the 30 November 1985 edition of TV Week, where she revealed that she had signed to the show for six months. Writer Patrice Fidgeon speculated that she would continue beyond that. Charleston admitted that she did not watch the early episodes of the serial, but when she did eventually tune in, she liked what she saw and became "hooked." She found that the domestic situations in the show were "very believable" and it worked well.

Shortly after her introduction, Charleston became one of the show's most popular actors. She quit Neighbours in 1992, but when she suffered financial difficulties following a failed lawsuit and debts, she returned in 1996. Of her return, Charleston said: "When Neighbours asked me back, I didn't have any option. It was the only way to get back on my feet."

== Development ==
=== Characterisation ===
Madge was introduced as Max Ramsay's (Francis Bell) sister, who comes to Erinsborough after learning he has separated from his wife Maria Ramsay (Dasha Bláhová). Charleston explained: "When Madge hears from a mutual friend that Max's wife has left him, she hops on a plane and arrives on his doorstep, complete with 24 pieces of luggage." Madge becomes convinced that Max needs looking after and she decides that she is the person to do that, much to his horror. Charleston joked that Madge was "a real cow", but she does not mean to be, she is just well-meaning, but comes across as "an absolute pain in the neck." Charleston continued saying that Max does not want Madge "anywhere near him, let alone in his own house, and he's horrified to think she's going to spend even one night under the same roof." Fidgeon pointed out that not much is known about Madge's fictional backstory, and Charleston replied that her character was married, but thought that her husband may have died, as Madge begins "making eyes" at Jim Robinson (Alan Dale). She added "And I can't imagine her doing that if she still had a husband around. She's a very prim and proper lady."

Virgin Media describe Madge as being "strong, hot headed and tough". They compare her to other characters, stating: "the husky voiced one was the opposite of prim and proper Harold and more than a match for anyone who crossed her path, like Mrs Mangel with whom she had a long running rivalry.

=== Departure (2001) ===
In December 2000, it was announced that Charleston had decided to leave Neighbours for a second time and that she had already filmed her final scenes. The official Neighbours website said Charleston had left the set on 24 November and details of Madge's exit storyline were being kept secret, but the door was not left open for a future return. Of her departure, Charleston said: "This is a sad day in many ways, as I am going to miss a lot of people. However, I am also looking forward to the future and new challenges. Leaving this time around is certainly very different to the last time. Although I thought the last time was also final, I am now leaving knowing that the door will be closed and I won't be going back. I'm happy with the way Madge has been written out – it's very strong and dramatic."

The writers decided to kill off the character as they realised that Madge would never intentionally leave Harold. Smith commented, "because of the way the two have been portrayed, the way they feel about each other, one couldn't just walk away from the other. It would never work." On-screen, Madge was diagnosed with pancreatic cancer and she contracted septicaemia shortly afterward. With Harold by her side, Madge died in her bed.

In 2005, Charleston revealed that she left Neighbours because she did not agree with changes the production company made to her character. She said: "They tried to mess around with Madge, and tried to make her into a bit of a wimp really, a bit of a victim. I didn't enjoy it because I had spent all those years building up this wonderful strong woman and they tried to take her apart, brick by brick."

=== Returns (2015, 2022) ===
In November 2014, it was announced that Charleston had reprised her role for Neighbours' 30th anniversary celebrations in March 2015. Charleston said she "didn't even stop to think about it" when she was asked to return, adding that the anniversary is "so special" that she would not have missed it. She found returning to the set strange as it had changed a lot since her departure. Holly Byrnes from the Herald Sun reported that Madge was expected to appear as a ghost due to her on-screen death in 2001. Actor Ryan Moloney (Toadfish Rebecchi) later confirmed that Madge would be a figment of Harold's imagination. Madge returned on 4 March 2015. After Harold returns for the Erinsborough Festival and Madge's grandson, Daniel's (Tim Phillipps) wedding, he began hearing her voice and smelling her perfume. Harold became distracted by his thoughts of Madge and crashed his vehicle through the festival. When he came to, Madge was sitting beside him. She later appeared to Harold again and told him that she would be with him for as long as he needed her. Charleston also reprised the role on 28 July 2022 for the serial's finale.

In 2024, Charleston filmed scenes as a new character, Agnes Adair, as part of Harold's departure from the series.

== Storylines ==
=== 1986–1992 ===
Madge goes to Ramsay Street and moves in with her brother Max Ramsay and his two sons, Shane (Peter O'Brien) and Danny (David Clencie). Madge's best friend Helen Daniels (Anne Haddy), lives next door and Madge gets a job with Helen's grandson, Paul Robinson (Stefan Dennis), at the Daniels Corporation. Paul believes that Madge would be better off at the Waterhole pub and she becomes the manager. Max leaves for Queensland and their brother Tom (Gary Files) moves in and takes over his business. Madge's daughter Charlene (Kylie Minogue) also comes to Ramsay Street to live with Madge on being dismissed by her father, Fred (Nick Waters). Charlene holds Madge responsible for the break-up of her and Fred's marriage and she hurts her mother further, when she reveals she is friends with Susan Cole (Gloria Ajenstat), the woman Fred left Madge for. Fred later turns up and Madge initially believes he has changed, but she sees he is still the same and he leaves. When Charlene starts dating Scott Robinson (Jason Donovan), Madge fears things between the couple are moving too fast. When Charlene brings home a baby, Sam, she tells Madge that he is hers. Madge is shocked, but grows fond of Sam. Susan turns up at Madge's home and it is revealed that Sam is her child. Madge is hurt, but she lets Susan and Sam stay with her because Fred walked out on them.

Madge briefly dates Ray Murphy (Norman Yemm). Her school sweetheart Harold Bishop (Ian Smith) is invited to Ramsay Street by Charlene and Shane and he and Madge realise that they still have feelings for each other. They start dating and Harold moves in with Nell Mangel (Vivean Gray). Madge's son Henry (Craig McLachlan) is released from prison and arrives in Erinsborough for a fresh start. Madge tells him to leave, but Charlene convinces her to let him stay. Harold proposes to Madge and she accepts. When their old friend Lou Carpenter (Tom Oliver) hears about the engagement, he flies to Erinsborough to try to win Madge for himself. Madge chooses Harold and they marry. Charlene also marries Scott and when they leave for Brisbane, Madge lets Henry's girlfriend, Bronwyn Davies (Rachel Friend), move in. Madge and Harold win the Lottery and they take a trip around the world. In London, they meet Eddie Buckingham (Bob La Castra), who comes back to Australia with them and works in their café. Harold's daughter, Kerry (Linda Hartley-Clark), moves in and Madge is happy to be a grandmother to Kerry's daughter, Sky (Miranda Fryer).

After Harold suffers a heart attack, the couple decide to go on a tour of Australia. During a trip to a beach, Madge stops to speak to an artist and Harold goes missing. Madge finds his glasses on the rocks and it appears that Harold has been washed out to sea. Madge, Helen and Harold's son-in-law Joe Mangel (Mark Little) hold a memorial service for him on the beach. Madge then decides to leave for Brisbane. Madge returns to Ramsay Street a few months later, and she finds Lou living there. Lou proposes to her, but she tells him that she cannot commit to him so soon after Harold. Lou eventually persuades Madge to give their relationship a chance and when he proposes again, she accepts. She also helps him buy his own car yard. Lou later realises that he cannot replace Harold and calls off the wedding. Madge and Lou remain friends and she sells the coffee shop lease to Cathy Alessi (Elspeth Ballantyne). She then returns to Brisbane to help Scott and Charlene with their new baby, Daniel.

=== 1996–2001 ===
Four years later, Helen contacts Madge and tells her that Harold is alive. Harold is suffering from amnesia and Madge flies back to Erinsborough to see him. Madge tries to make him remember her and their life in Erinsborough. Madge decides to stay in Erinsborough and she moves in with Helen. Lou tries to win her back again, but gives up. Harold eventually regains his memory and he and Madge renew their wedding vows. They later move back into Ramsay Street and buy back the lease of the Coffee Shop. Madge and Harold host a French exchange student, Claire Girard (Adele Schober), for a few weeks and Helen dies. Although Madge is of course very upset about losing her best friend, she nevertheless becomes a shoulder to cry on for Helen's extremely grief-stricken great-granddaughter Hannah Martin (Rebecca Ritters). Harold and Madge become foster parents to Paul McClain (Jansen Spencer). Paul is initially hostile towards Madge, but he eventually warms to her. Madge is diagnosed with a cerebral aneurysm and undergoes brain surgery. She loses her eyesight for a while and almost sets the house on fire, when she tries to do some cooking. Her sight later returns.

Madge joins the senior ladies basketball team and finds an enemy in the coach, Portia Grant (Sue Ingleton). When Portia is injured, Madge takes her place as captain in the finals. Madge and Harold become surrogate parents to Tad Reeves (Jonathon Dutton). Madge goes to Queensland for a few months to look after her new granddaughter, Madison, after Daniel is hit by a car. Madge and Lou go into business together creating a cookery website, Ozechef. Madge also writes a cookbook called Ramsay Recipes, with help from Harold and Lyn Scully (Janet Andrewartha). Libby Kennedy (Kym Valentine) asks Madge to become the Erinsborough News' new agony aunt and Madge agrees. She keeps it a secret from Harold and he is appalled when he finds out the truth as her advice to readers had angered him.

Madge collapses one night when she is locking up the Coffee Shop. She suffers abdominal pains and Karl Kennedy (Alan Fletcher) sends her to the hospital for tests. Madge learns that she has pancreatic cancer. Madge prepares to fight the cancer, but she is told that it has spread to her liver and she only has six months to live. Madge is angry and refuses to accept her fate, but she soon comes to terms with her situation and tells her family. Paul does not handle the news well as his own mother died of cancer. Harold decides to take Madge to Paris and Lou arranges for them to fly in business class. Madge also starts attending Paul's football matches and listening to Tad's music. Madge develops septicaemia after cutting her finger and Dee Bliss (Madeleine West) finds her collapsed on the living room floor. Madge is rushed to hospital and the doctors tell Harold that Madge only has a short time left. Madge returns home to die. Paul and Tad tell her how much she means to them and Lou confesses that he still loves her. Madge then dies in Harold's arms.

=== 2015, 2022 ===
Years later, when Harold returns to Erinsborough, he starts thinking about Madge. He begins hearing her voice and smelling her perfume. After he crashes his vehicle through the Erinsborough Festival, he sees Madge sitting beside him. At the hospital, Madge appears to him again, telling him she has returned as she knows he needs her. They discuss Daniel's upcoming wedding, and Madge declares she wants to meet his fiancée Amber Turner (Jenna Rosenow) to see what she thinks of her. Madge disapproves of Amber and believes Daniel should be with Imogen Willis (Ariel Kaplan), as she reminds Madge of herself. Madge encourages Harold to go on a date with Sheila Canning (Colette Mann), but he tells her that she is the only one for him. When Sky asks Harold to move to Port Douglas to be with her and her children, she mentions Madge came to her in a dream. Harold and Madge take a last look at Number 24, and Madge confirms that she will not be coming with Harold on his journey. They say a final goodbye and Madge promises that she will always watch over Harold and that they will one day be reunited.

Madge appears as a figment of Susan's imagination while Susan is imagining lost friends during a Ramsay Street party. Madge is seen talking with Harold and Doug Willis (Terence Donovan).

== Reception ==
For her portrayal of Madge, Charleston won the Performance by an Actress in a Series or Serial accolade at the 1987 Penguin Awards. The episode featuring Madge's death earned writer Shane Porteous (under the pen name John Hanlon) the Australian Writers' Guild award for "Best Episode in a Television Serial".

In 2007, Australian newspaper the Herald Sun placed Madge's death at number two on their list of Neighbours Top Ten moments. They said: "One of the most memorable characters in the show was Madge Bishop, played by Anne Charleston, who now lives in the UK. After enduring so much, she and husband Harold were looking forward to a happy retirement until Madge was diagnosed with cancer, dying a few months later in the arms of Harold in 2001. It was a death that rivaled Daphne's in the sadness stakes". Holy Soap also named Madge's death as one of their top Neighbours moments. They called her one of the most memorable characters in the show and said viewers were left in mourning when she died in Harold's arms. Tony Squires from The Sydney Morning Herald branded Madge a "classically over-the-top character", who producers should have given more screen time to.

Ruth Deller of television website Lowculture gave Madge a five out of five for her contribution to Neighbours, during a feature called "A guide to recognising your Ramsays and Robinsons". Deller said: "The longest-serving and most loved member of the Ramsay clan was the formidable Madge". Deller added that "Madge was a force to be reckoned with on the street" and she called Madge's death "one of the most emotional storylines in the show". British satellite broadcasting company, Sky, named Madge one of their twenty-five most memorable Neighbours characters of all time. Of Madge, Sky said: "If Helen Daniels was the kindly matriarch of Ramsay Street, Madge was happy to croak her way to being the fiery, fiercely protective mother figure of her pop brood, Craig McLachlan and Kylie. Her temperament made her romance with mild-mannered Harold all the more touching, from initially choosing him over Lou, to being the right and proper owners of the coffee shop, and finally the teary scenes when she died of cancer in 2001. That being said, it's the voice that she's really remembered for, standing on a causeway and yelling Harold's name at the ocean like a demented fishwife."

Virgin Media included Madge in their top ten favourite soap characters poll in 2007. Orange UK describe Madge's style as being "slightly transsexual" and they stated "She was the gravel-voiced matriarch of Ramsay Street. When she was not busy fending off the advances of Lou Carpenter, ruling tomboy daughter Charlene with an iron grip or running the coffee shop, she was marrying Harold Bishop." In 2013, Rachael Misstear from Western Mail included Madge's death in her list of the "10 tear-jerking soap opera exits". She commented "It was one of the most heartbreaking deaths in the Ozzie soap's history. When one half of the golden couple in Aussie soap-land died, it left an army of fans bereft. How would Harold Bishop go on without his beloved Madge?" Madge was placed at number five on the Huffpost's "35 greatest Neighbours characters of all time" feature. Journalist Adam Beresford described her as a "classic soap matriarch" and quickly established herself as "one of the audience’s favourite characters." He added that her early infamy came from exasperated maternal cries of "Charleeene!" when shouting her daughter and her nightmarish "hoarse wail". Beresford assessed that Madge was "representing generations of Aussie women whose toughness earned the respect of their menfolk, Madge was a forthright force of nature." In 2022, Kate Randall from Heat included Madge and Harold in the magazine's top ten Neighbours characters of all time feature. Randall profiled the duo stating "love's old dream, these two were everything we adored about Neighbours." In a feature profiling the "top 12 iconic Neighbours characters", critic Sheena McGinley of the Irish Independent placed Madge and Harold as joint tenth place. Sam Strutt of The Guardian compiled a feature counting down the top ten most memorable moments from history of Neighbours. Strutt included Madge's death as the fourth most memorable. Anne-Marie O'Connor of New Ross Standard branded Madge a "gruff voiced old vixen". O'Connor found Madge's funeral so emotional that she stated "pass the Kleenex and be prepared to blub your way through Neighbours this week."

In the book, "1001 TV Series You Must Watch Before You Die", Madge's death episode was chosen as the show's single best episode. TV writer Gary Russell commented that "deaths in Neighbours provide the most emotionally gut-wrenching moments. But none can match the sheer sadness of matriarch Madge Bishop succumbing to cancer in her bed, with Harold by her side."
