= Harold Bishop =

Fictional character in the Australian soap opera Neighbours

- Neighbours character
- Portrayed by: Ian Smith
- Duration: 1987–1991, 1996–2009, 2011, 2015, 2022–2025
- First appearance: 30 January 1987
- Last appearance: 27 May 2025
- Created by: Reg Watson
- Introduced by: Reg Watson (1987); Stanley Walsh (1996); Susan Bower (2011); Jason Herbison (2015)
In-universe information
- Other names: Ted
- Occupation: Health food shop manager; Newspaper columnist; Coffee shop owner; Salvation Army volunteer; Grease Monkeys manager; The General Store co-owner
- Father: Frank Bishop
- Wife: Mavis Bishop (backstory); Madge Ramsay (1988–2001); Carolyn Johnstone (2011–2015)
- Sons: David Bishop
- Daughters: Kerry Bishop
- Stepsons: Henry Ramsay
- Stepdaughters: Charlene Robinson
- Grandsons: Toby Mangel (adoptive); Daniel Robinson (step)
- Granddaughters: Sky Mangel; Serena Bishop
- Other relatives: Kerry Mangel; Scotty

Harold Bishop is a fictional character from the Australian soap opera Neighbours, played by Ian Smith. The actor was offered the role by the show's creator and executive producer Reg Watson. Smith made his first screen appearance as Harold during the episode broadcast on 30 January 1987. He departed in September 1991, with the character seemingly killed off, but returned in October 1996. Harold remained on screen for over twelve years, becoming one of the longest-running characters in the show's history.

Smith announced his departure from Neighbours in August 2008. Following a cancer storyline, Harold made his final appearance on 27 February 2009. In December 2010, Smith revealed that he would be reprising his role and Harold returned on 9 May 2011. During his brief return stint, Harold married Carolyn Johnstone (Paula Duncan), a storyline that was suggested by Smith. The character of Harold has been well received by critics and Smith earned various award nominations for his performance, including the Most Popular Personality on Australian Television Logie Award. Harold returned again in February 2015, ahead of the show's 30th anniversary. Smith reprised his role for the show's finale and began filming in February 2022. Harold returned to the role for a guest arc as part of the series' continuation, via Amazon Freevee. On 18 September 2023, Harold returned in episode 8904, and departed again on 10 October 2023. He returned to the show on a permanent basis on 28 May 2024. On 2 December 2024, Smith announced that he had been diagnosed with a rare form of aggressive lung cancer, and that he would be leaving the show for good. He departed on 14 April 2025, with a further scene on 27 May 2025.

== Casting ==
The show's creator and then executive producer Reg Watson offered Ian Smith the role of Harold, following the end of his television drama Prisoner, with which Smith had been a script editor and associate producer. After agreeing to the role, Smith also asked if he could write for the show too. Smith was only supposed to be in Neighbours for five weeks, but a couple of weeks after he had finished filming, Smith was asked back. Smith admitted that he was not prepared for how popular the show would become, saying "I naively thought I was signing on for a frothy little soap that would come and go as most of them do. I had no inkling of the international success that lay in store for Neighbours." Comedian Peter Moon revealed in 2009 that he had originally auditioned for the role of Harold. Moon said "Ian Smith beat me to it, so it is kind of weird thinking about the life I could have had. When I auditioned, I went into wardrobe and they gave me a pair of shoes to wear that had Harold written on them". Moon was eventually given a role with the soap twenty years later.

== Development ==
=== Characterisation ===
In his fictional backstory, Harold was a stock and station agent, who married a woman called Mavis. The couple had two children, David (Kevin Harrington) and Kerry (Linda Hartley-Clark). After Mavis's death, Harold was left to cope with his teenage children alone. He had a close relationship with David, but Kerry rebelled against Harold's conservative ways and she left to travel the world. David later moved to Adelaide.

Harold is described as being "indecisive, considerate, stuffy and reserved." Harold is a Christian and never misses church on Sunday, he was also once an "enthusiastic" Scout leader. Due to his ways, Harold would not live with Madge Ramsay (Anne Charleston) until they were married. Virgin Media said Harold is "prim and proper" and "an old-fashioned fuddy-duddy." They also state he is the complete opposite of Madge and add he is "famed for his vegetarian ways, tee-total habits and fastidiousness and moralising" Harold's hobbies include playing the tuba, giving his time to the Salvation Army and birdwatching. Smith hated playing the tuba and wished the producers would have given Harold a mouth organ instead. He said "I think they thought, 'Here's a big fat actor, let's give him a big fat instrument. That'll be funny!'." Harold also briefly has a comedic alter ego named "Afro Harold." Smith told Inside Soap in 1999 that Harold's "pessimism and pontificating" really got to him, but he agreed with Harold's moral outlook on life.

In 2003, Harold had a stroke and his personality changed. He left the Salvation Army, became a "peeping tom", started drinking alcohol and he pinched Izzy Hoyland's (Natalie Bassingthwaighte) bottom. Smith researched strokes and how they affect a person's psyche after becoming concerned that Harold's behaviour would stretch his character's credibility too much. Harold later recovered and returned to his previous ways. Network Ten dubbed Harold the "undisputed patriarch of Erinsborough" and the heart and soul of the community.

=== Friendship with Lou Carpenter ===
Lou Carpenter (Tom Oliver) was initially Harold's "nemesis" and rival for Madge's affections. They had both fallen for Madge while they were all at school together. Lou arrives in Ramsay Street to steal Madge from Harold before she marries him, but he cannot stop the wedding and he leaves. Lou later returns and becomes friends with Harold. Oliver said that some reviewers had likened Lou and Harold's relationship to Laurel and Hardy and The Odd Couple. The Courier-Mail said Harold and Lou's friendship was one of their favourite "bromances" on television. They said their most bromantic moment was "When Harold returned to Erinsborough, after being feared drowned for many years, he had no memory of his old life. But when Lou served him jelly one night Harold suddenly remembered how Lou used to tease him at school by calling him "Jelly Belly" and, presto, his memory was restored." Harold is imprisoned after a case of mistaken identity and Lou raises the money for his bail.

Harold later donates a kidney to Lou and they go into business together, founding the General Store. Harold and Lou both fall for Rosie Hoyland (Maggie Millar), which leads to some arguments and Harold destroying a love letter from Lou to Rosie. When Gino Esposito (Shane McNamara) moves in with Harold, the writers decided to tweak the "standard love triangle story" with Lou becoming jealous of the Gino and Harold's friendship. Harold and Gino get along very well and share a love of Broadway musical DVDs. Of this, Peter Mattessi of The Age said "The tension this created between Lou and Harold ("same-sex platonic life-partners", according to Toadie) was a wonderful storytelling twist, and the innuendo made Gino's sexuality clear to those in the know, yet avoided the questions from younger viewers which would jeopardise the G rating." After Smith announced his departure in 2008, Oliver was asked if Lou would be sad about his best friend's exit and he said "Oh yes, definitely, but the old rascals keep in touch all the time. It was a sad farewell. Not just in character, but for me and Ian [Smith] too".

=== Departure (1991) ===
Smith was written out in 1991. He told Inside Soap's Mary Fletcher: "I would love the luxury of saying it was my decision to leave, but it wasn't." His departure occurred amidst a ratings decline. Network Ten's executive John Holmes took control of a cast revamp; he introduced new characters and helped to write out Harold and seven other characters. Holmes believed the show had become "tired" and that introducing more "young and spunky" characters would improve the show's future. Smith later explained that he was offered a new contract with a significant cut in salary, but he was not prepared to accept it. When he returned from a short holiday, he learned that Harold would be washed off a rock and presumed dead. Smith told Fletcher that he had been "pretty restless" for over a year, so he was not shocked by the development, and instead saw it as an opportunity to pursue other work. Harold's exit storyline saw him swept out to sea while he and Madge are visiting the coast. One minute he is standing on a rock, looking out over the sea, and the next he is gone. The character's exit was left "deliberately ambiguous", so Smith could return to the show if he wanted to. Smith said "Harold's body may have been washed out to sea long ago. On the other hand, he may be living happily under a false name somewhere else in Australia. Only time will tell."

=== Reintroduction (1996) ===
Smith returned to the role in 1996. He was initially asked to reprise the role for a three-month guest appearance. When the character's return proved popular with viewers, Smith was invited to re-join the regular cast along with Charleston. Smith admitted that he had a feeling he and Charleston would be asked back, explaining "The producers were already talking about new storylines for Harold and Madge – and they don't waste time with things like that unless there's a reason behind it!" Harold initially returns to Erinsborough alone to audition to become a tuba player in the Salvation Army band, but it soon becomes apparent that there is another reason for his return. Smith said "he feels that Madge has to get away from Brisbane, where they're living at the moment. The reason why is a really human one, and one I think most of the viewers will agree with."

Harold became the second longest-running character in the show's history. Smith decided to go part-time on the show in 2007. He had been ready to depart Neighbours for good, but the producers did not want him to leave. They then offered him a compromise, which would see Smith film for six weeks and then have a four-month break. Smith said that he was "awfully glad" that the producers talked him into coming back and explained, "I'm not retiring, but I am walking away from having to work 13-hour days, day after day." Smith began appearing intermittently during 2008 and this forced the writers to take Harold in a new direction. Harold's first departure saw him leave Ramsay Street for a tour around Australia.

=== Prostate cancer and departure (2008–09) ===
In August 2008, it was announced that Smith had quit Neighbours. Paula Lucarelli of Network Ten said "When the discussions were made about his decision to go part-time last year, he said it was only going to be for a short time and then he would let us know. Production was aware that it would be coming." Smith began filming his final scenes in October of that year for a departure in February 2009. Smith revealed that he quit Neighbours, so he could travel more and because he was getting "ongoing abuse" from local people.

Chris Irvine from The Daily Telegraph reported that Harold would leave Erinsborough after winning a fight with prostate cancer. After Harold returned from a road trip, he accompanied Lou to see Karl Kennedy (Alan Fletcher). Karl suggested Harold should have a check-up and Harold was later diagnosed with prostate cancer, which needed immediate medical attention. Due to Harold's Christian beliefs and the loss of Madge to cancer, he believed that the diagnosis was "fate trying to reunite them" and he refused treatment. Fletcher said "Harold obviously has a lot of things to think about. He had to weigh up his belief that he'll be reunited with Madge against the love he feels for his friends and family who are still alive. It's a very difficult situation to be in." Harold shut everyone out of his life as he tried to cope with the news. After speaking to neighbour and fellow cancer sufferer, Stephanie Scully (Carla Bonner), Harold eventually agreed to have surgery and underwent chemotherapy treatment.

While cheering up Donna Freedman (Margot Robbie) at the General Store, Harold had a heart attack, which left him fighting for his life. His friends and neighbours held a 24-hour vigil at the hospital hoping he would pull through. Harold later flat-lined and Karl, despite knowing it could get him into trouble with the hospital authorities, went against Harold's wish to not be resuscitated. Fletcher commented "Harold's heart stops beating, so Karl chooses to override his wishes and bring him back to life. As he fears, Harold is furious with him when he regains consciousness, insisting that he wanted to be reunited with his beloved wife, Madge, who died of cancer. Because of Karl's actions, Harold feels as though Madge has been taken away from him twice." Harold forgave Karl for saving him, but made it clear that he no longer wanted to live. Harold eventually recovered and he decided to leave Erinsborough to go and live with his granddaughter. Smith's final scenes as Harold were broadcast on 27 February 2009 in Australia. During an interview with Digital Spy, executive producer Susan Bower said she regretted choosing not to kill Harold during the cancer storyline due to the attention his impending exit had garnered, but she remained pleased that the character was still alive. She added "we've got a lovely photograph of him in the store and we named the store after Harold, at least means that his spirit will always live on."

=== Guest returns (2011–2023) ===
"There's no doubt about it: if there's one person you need in a Ramsay Street crisis, it's Harold Bishop. Famed for his infinite wisdom and charitable ways, he's counselled many a resident through times of trouble – and he'll be doing it all over again when he soon makes his long-awaited return to Erinsborough."

— Holy Soap on Harold's return

In December 2010, cast member Ryan Moloney revealed to TV Week that Smith would be returning to Neighbours in 2011. Moloney said Smith would appear "for a little bit" and it was later reported by the Herald Sun that Smith would return for six weeks. Smith began filming his comeback scenes in February 2011. He told Holy Soap that he was surprised when he was asked to return to Neighbours and after talking with his wife, they agreed that he should go back for a brief stint. Smith later revealed that he was returning to work because he had suffered during the recession and wanted to earn some money. He also said that the chance to play Harold again was "appealing" and that he did not get a chance to say a proper goodbye to him. Smith vowed that it would be his last return to the show, as he and his wife have plans to travel through central Australia.

Harold returned on 9 May 2011. His return storyline saw him come back to Ramsay Street to help a friend. Smith said that viewers will think they know who it is, but they would be wrong. Smith said "And of course there's human pathos, there's laughs – lots of laughs – [and] a little bit of romance, but I'm not saying who for, because I don't think she/he would like me to let it out. Look, there's a little bit of everything, but the thing is it's all a happy ending and it couldn't be better, and I loved it." Smith pitched one idea for Harold's return and he said that it would be interesting to revisit the character once more. A few months later it was revealed that Harold comes back to Erinsborough after receiving a call for help from Toadfish Rebecchi. Not all of Harold's help is "received as graciously as it's given" and Harold's new relationship with Carolyn Johnstone (Paula Duncan) was not welcomed by some of the neighbours. Smith told Sarah from Inside Soap that when the producers asked him if there was a particular storyline he would like to play, he suggested that Harold should get married and so he returns engaged. Harold's news was not well received by his best friend Lou.

On 16 November 2014, it was announced that Smith had reprised his role for Neighbours' 30th anniversary in 2015. It was also confirmed that Harold would be reunited with his deceased wife Madge, who was thought to appear as a ghost. Smith initially had some doubts about returning to Neighbours again, as he was unsure if he remembered what to do. He said "I worried about remembering the words for starters, and the first scene I remembered the words but I forgot to act. But it's like falling off the horse. The old horse remembered me and I remembered it and we were fine." Smith also said he was sceptical about the storyline with Madge, believing that it would be "one of those American arising from the dead" plots, but after it was explained to him, he thought it had been "cleverly handled" and revealed that it had been dreamt up by Jackie Woodburne (Susan Kennedy).

Harold made his on-screen return during the episode broadcast on 17 February 2015. Harold was reunited with his old friends, Toadie and Lou. When Toadie notices that Harold is quick to change the subject whenever Carolyn is brought up and that he is carrying around a picture of Madge in his wallet, Toadie suspects Harold is hiding something. After calling Carolyn, Toadie learns that she and Harold have broken up. Harold admits that he and Carolyn were not quite the soul mates he has thought they were. He also tells Lou that he was embarrassed as his life was not perfect. Harold gives Madge's grandson Daniel (Tim Phillipps) advice about his future wedding to Amber Turner (Jenna Rosenow), as he wants Daniel to have realistic expectations about marriage.

In February 2022, Laura-Jayne Tyler of Inside Soap reported that Smith would be reprising his role to play a part in the show's finale, and that he had already started filming. A week later, Smith's co-star Alan Fletcher confirmed Harold's return, as he spoke about show's final episodes on This Morning. On 7 May, Smith spoke about reprising his role for the final episodes airing later that year, saying: "It's an absolute pleasure to be back. I'm the biggest sook under the sun. I'm going to be shocking on the last night that Neighbours airs. It really will be an end of an era and I am so proud to have been a part of it." Harold returned on 18 July in Australia and on 6 July in the UK. He makes a "surprise arrival" in Erinsborough, where he befriends Zara Selwyn (Freya Van Dyke) who shares his concerns about her mother Amy Greenwood (Jacinta Stapleton), and Toadie and Melanie Pearson's (Lucinda Cowden) engagement. Harold also helps counsel a grieving Mackenzie Hargreaves (Georgie Stone) by opening up about his own experiences with grief.

In February 2023, Variety announced Smith's return to the series in a guest capacity. He appeared in a guest stint for nine episodes in the first month of the show's reboot. His return plot centred to Harold experiencing memory loss. Alan Fletcher who plays Karl Kennedy, told Digital Spy that Harold is "exhibiting behaviour that is medically concerning", and that it is "a lot more complex than at first we think it is". Later on, local doctor Remi Varga-Murphy (Naomi Rukavina) identifies that his medication is causing his memory loss. Harold departs the series again on 10 October 2023.

=== Permanent return (2024–2025) ===
On 8 April 2024, it was announced that Smith would return to the series on a permanent basis. Joe Anderton of Digital Spy expressed surprise at the announcement, as Smith had stated his desire to retire the previous year. Smith later clarified that he had agreed to work on the series one day per week. Harold's return aired on 28 May of that year. On-screen, Harold returns to Erinsborough to live at the Eirini Rising retirement complex. Smith ascribed Harold's move to sentimentality, noting that he feels closer to Madge when in Erinsborough.

On 2 December 2024, Smith announced that he had recently been diagnosed with a rare and aggressive form of terminal lung cancer, and that as a consequence he had left the role of Harold. Smith stated that doctors labelled his cancer as "non-fixable" and that they "expect him to die". Smith spoke to 10 News First about his diagnosis and final day on set. Executive producer Jason Herbison confirmed that Harold would have a "proper send-off", and it was also revealed that Charleston had returned to the series in a new role as part of Harold's departure.

The beginning of Harold's exit storyline is previewed in spoilers and pictures for the Neighbours 40th Anniversary week released by Digital Spy. Spoiler pictures show the arrival of Charleston's new character Agnes Adair, and spoilers reveal that she will be spotted by JJ looking at a picture of Madge on the Story of Erinsborough display, who will be "struck by how similar" Agnes is to Madge. Further spoilers reveal that JJ will introduce Agnes to Harold, who is "stunned by how much" she looks like Madge, however, this makes Agnes "grow awkward" and she "threatens to leave". Harold's introduction to Agnes is previewed in a promotional trailer released on Neighbours social media accounts, which shows him taken aback and referring to her as Madge, before saying "No it can't be, you're dead." Further spoiler pictures reveal that Harold would continue to get to know and spend time with Agnes at Eirini Rising.

Charleston's return was devised prior to Smith's diagnosis to build towards an eventual exit for Harold, before Smith's health required the storyline to be truncated and redeveloped. It was structured to provide potential exit points for Harold each week, due to uncertainty around how long Smith would be able to film for. Harold's final episode aired on 14 April 2025, showing the character deciding to return to his family in Queensland. Shortly after his on-screen departure, it was revealed that an "additional moment" Smith filmed before his departure would be shown later in the year. Spoilers revealed that Harold would make his final ever appearance on 27 May 2025, as part of Agnes's exit storyline from the show, with her "turning up at his door".

== Storylines ==
=== 1987–1991 ===
Madge's daughter, Charlene (Kylie Minogue), calls Harold and invites him to Erinsborough to see Madge. Harold surprises Madge when he arrives on her doorstep and he is keen to rekindle their romance. Harold decides to settle in the area and he opens a health food shop and moves in with Nell Mangel (Vivean Gray), who secretly admires Harold, as he is a churchgoer like she is. Harold proposes to Madge, but he calls off the wedding when Charlene wants to move in with Scott Robinson (Jason Donovan) out of wedlock, and Madge throws her ring in Lassiter's Lake. Harold takes over the Coffee Shop when Daphne Clarke (Elaine Smith) goes on maternity leave. Daphne dies and Harold stays on as permanent manager; he also writes for the Erinsborough News.

Eileen Clarke (Myra De Groot) spreads rumours that Harold is a lady-killer and when Harold discovers that people are talking about him, he tries to leave town. Charlene tells Harold that she has not finished working on his brakes, but he does not listen and crashes his car. Harold breaks both arms and Madge realises that she loves Harold and they resume their engagement. Lou Carpenter arrives in town and declares his love for Madge, Harold punches him during a fight. Madge chooses Harold and they marry. Harold saves Des Clarke's (Paul Keane) life and Des offers him a partnership in the Coffee Shop. Harold and Madge later buy Des out.

Kerry shows up and Harold is shocked to find out that she had had a child out of wedlock, but he is delighted to be a grandfather to Sky (Miranda Fryer). Harold invites Kerry to move in with him and Madge. Harold is initially against Kerry's relationship with Joe Mangel (Mark Little), but he sees how much Joe loves her and Sky and gives their relationship his blessing. Joe and Kerry marry and Joe's son, Toby (Finn Greentree-Keane) calls Harold "grandad". Harold and Madge win the lottery and take a trip around the world, they meet Eddie Buckingham (Bob La Castra) in England and he comes home with them. Kerry is shot and killed by a duck hunter, which devastates Harold. He develops a stronger bond with Joe as a result. Harold has a heart attack when he discovers that Madge has invited Lou to stay. Harold and Madge decide to go on holiday. During a walk on a coastal path, Madge stops to talk to a painter and when she looks around, Harold is nowhere to be seen. Madge finds Harold's glasses at the edge of a cliff and his body is not found.

=== 1996–2015 ===
Five years later, it is revealed that Harold was swept out to sea and picked up by a trawler. He has amnesia and calls himself Ted. He works for the Salvation Army after they helped him start a new life. Harold turns up in Ramsay Street to collect some boxes from Marlene Kratz (Moya O'Sullivan). As Harold leaves, he bumps into Helen Daniels (Anne Haddy) who is shocked to see him. She tries to track him down and leaves her number for Harold at the Salvation Army shop. Harold calls Helen and comes to see her, but he becomes frustrated as he does not remember the things she tells him and leaves. Helen calls Madge, who had moved away, to tell her that Harold is alive and Madge flies to Erinsborough.

Harold and Madge renew their vows (1997)

Marlene invites Harold to join her for lunch at the Coffee Shop, where Helen, Lou and Madge are waiting. Harold recognises Madge, but he has no idea that she is his wife until she tells him everything. Harold starts counselling and his memory returns. Harold and Madge renew their wedding vows and they move to Queensland. Harold returns to Erinsborough to play the tuba in a Salvation Army concert and he rents his old house. He and Madge eventually move back and they buy the Coffee Shop. Harold befriends Paul McClain (Jansen Spencer) and he and Madge foster him. They later foster Paul's friend, Tad Reeves (Jonathon Dutton) too. Harold and Madge decide to take over the running of Grease Monkeys, but they later sell the business.

Madge is diagnosed with pancreatic cancer and given six months to live, which devastates Harold. Madge develops septicaemia and Karl tells Harold that Madge only has a short time left. Madge dies in Harold's arms. Both Paul and Tad leave and Lou moves in. Rosie Hoyland (Maggie Millar) arrives and Harold and Lou become rivals for her love, but she tells Harold that she just wants to be friends. Harold then finds himself rejecting Valda Sheergold's (Joan Sydney) advances. Harold tries a dating agency and starts dating Ruby Dwyer (Maureen Edwards), though she is just using him for money. Harold donates a kidney to Lou and when he is released from hospital, he discovers that his house has been burgled. He discovers that it was Ruby, but he tries to help her gambling problem and she later leaves to see her son.

Sky returns to see Harold and he is shocked to find that she is now a rebellious teenager with black and blue hair. Harold offers to tell her more about Kerry and he introduces her to Boyd Hoyland (Kyal Marsh). David, his wife, Liljana (Marcella Russo) and their daughter, Serena (Lara Sacher) also come to town. Harold is unhappy at David's behaviour, the way Liljana takes over his kitchen and how Serena is spoilt. Harold and David make up and Harold invites him to move in with him and Sky. Harold has a stroke and his personality changes. Harold becomes rude and selfish, he starts eating meat and drinking and he leaves the Salvation Army. Harold later recovers and goes back to normal. A fire sweeps through the Lassiter's Complex and burns the Coffee Shop to the ground. He sets up a temporary Coffee Shop at the Community Hall with Paul Robinson's (Stefan Dennis) help. Harold goes into business with Lou and they open the General Store. Joe returns and stays with Harold.

Sky, David, Liljana and Serena are involved in a plane crash. Sky is found and days later David's body is recovered. Liljana and Serena are never found. Harold goes into denial and punches Joe, Sky tells him that she needs him and he snaps out of it. Harold blames Paul Robinson for David, Liljana and Serena's deaths and he strangles Paul from behind. Paul survives and Harold later confesses to Paul, who does not press charges. Harold leaves town for a little while and on his return, he discovers that Sky is pregnant. Harold has a brief romance with Loris Timmins (Kate Fitzpatrick) and Sky gives birth to a daughter, Kerry (Claudine Henningsen). Sky moves away to be with Kerry's father and Harold throws himself into work at the General Store. He later decides to pack up and travel around the country. Harold meets Kate Newton (Briony Behets) and they briefly stop over in Erinsborough, before leaving together.

Harold returns for Christmas and goes for a checkup. He is shocked when Karl tells him that he has prostate cancer and needs urgent treatment. Harold does not take the news well, but Karl eventually convinces him to fight. Harold has an operation and begins chemotherapy after speaking to Stephanie Scully. Harold later has a heart attack and Karl ignores his wishes not to be resuscitated. Harold's cancer goes into remission and he decides to go and be with Sky. He gives his home to the Salvation Army and says goodbye to Susan Kennedy (Jackie Woodburne) when she sees him taking photos of Ramsay Street. The next day he says goodbye to everyone else and drives out of town. When he stops for tea, he discovers that Lou has been hiding in his camper van and they continue the journey together.

Two years later, Harold returns to Ramsay Street after receiving a call for help from Toadie, who is dealing with the news that his girlfriend Sonya Mitchell (Eve Morey) is the mother of his adopted son, Callum (Morgan Baker). Harold advises Toadie to be more forgiving and speak with Sonya. Harold meets Troy Miller (Dieter Brummer), but fails to pass his number onto Toadie as he thinks he has enough to deal with. After taking some secret calls, Harold tells Toadie that he is engaged to Carolyn Johnstone, a businesswoman. Harold witnesses a kiss between Sonya and Troy. Carolyn arrives and she and Harold confront Troy together. She also suggests that she and Harold get married in Erinsborough. Lou returns to town and is reunited with Harold. Lou does not get along with Carolyn and thinks she is stuck up. After they argue about Harold's bucks night, Harold gets Lou and Carolyn to compromise on a joint party at Charlie's. Troy physically threatens Harold, who tells Toadie.

On his wedding day, Harold visits Madge's grave to get her blessing. He and Carolyn then get married. Harold and Carolyn later return for their honeymoon and tell Lou that he has taken on too much at the car yard and that he needs to slow down. Lou does not listen to them and he later collapses. Harold tells Lou to start taking his health seriously and Lou announces his intentions to sell the car yard. Shortly before they leave, Callum asks Harold and Carolyn for their help in getting Sonya to move back in. Harold talks to Toadie, who thinks it might be too soon. After saying their goodbyes to Lou, Harold and Carolyn are informed that Toadie and Sonya are moving back in together. Toadie thanks Harold and he and Carolyn leave.

Harold returns to Ramsay Street for Daniel Robinson's wedding and the Erinsborough Festival. Harold catches up with Toadie and Lou. He tells them Carolyn could not accompany him as she is working, but then changes the subject when she is brought up again. Harold later makes a phone call to Carolyn and tells her he will send on her things. Harold asks Toadie to help him change his will and after Toadie calls Carolyn, he learns that she and Harold have split up. Harold tells Toadie that he and Carolyn drifted apart after realising that they were not soulmates after all. Harold befriends Sheila Canning (Colette Mann), who flirts with him. Harold begins thinking about Madge and starts to hear her voice. He becomes distracted while driving and crashes through the Erinsborough Festival. When he wakes, he sees Madge sitting beside him. She appears to him again and they converse about all the events Madge has missed and Daniel's wedding.

Madge disapproves of Daniel's fiancée and believes he is better suited to Imogen Willis (Ariel Kaplan). Harold then tells Daniel that marrying Amber would be a mistake and Daniel bans him from coming to the wedding. Madge encourages Harold to go on a date with Sheila and they bond over their families. But Harold later tells Madge that she is the only one for him. Harold tells Susan about Madge and she advises him to live in the present. Sky asks Harold to give up his nomadic lifestyle and move to Port Douglas to help out with her children. He agrees after Sky mentions Madge came to her in a dream, believing it to be a good idea. Harold takes a last look at Number 24 with Madge, who tells him she will not be coming with him. He leaves after saying goodbye to his friends.

Seven years later, Harold makes a surprise visit to the Kennedys, where he meets Mackenzie Hargreaves and expresses his sorrow for the loss of her husband, Hendrix Greyson (Ben Turland). Karl and Susan invite Harold to stay with them, before he visits the café and meets Jane Harris (Annie Jones) and her children Nicolette Stone (Charlotte Chimes) and Byron Stone (Joe Klocek). Harold visits Toadie's house and enters just as Zara Selwyn is questioning her mother Amy Greenwood about whether she has feelings for Toadie. Karl and Susan soon turn up and Toadie returns to announce that he and Melanie Pearson are engaged. Zara notices Harold does not look happy with the news and he admits that he has concerns. Zara is convinced that Toadie and Amy would make a better couple, and tells Harold that if he really cares about Toadie, he will help her break Toadie and Melanie up. Harold asks Amy's opinion of Melanie and her relationship with Toadie's children, but she assures him that Melanie is great with them.

Harold admits to Mackenzie that in addition to seeing Karl, Susan and Toadie, he came to Erinsborough for her. He talks to her about keeping hold of the memories she has of Hendrix and tells her about the visions he had of Madge. He encourages her to talk to Hendrix and reckons he and Madge would get on well. Zara later tells Harold about Melanie's issues with Sonya's presence around the house and her initial rejection of Toadie's proposal. When Harold says that he will not act as a matchmaker for Amy and Toadie, Zara asks whether he can stand back and do nothing. Melanie asks Harold if he is avoiding her and then asks him to make a toast at her wedding, but he makes an excuse not to. He tells Melanie that he has his reservations about the wedding and is worried about Toadie's children, as she hurt his grandchildren deeply when she left Joe. Harold privately tells Melanie that he is worried that she will treat Toadie's children the same as Joe's children and Melanie spends the engagement party staying away from him, before she tells Toadie what he said. Harold is then kicked out of the party. Harold calls Joe and he admits that he stretched the truth at the time and that his kids missed Melanie once she left. Harold explains to Toadie and Melanie, and the three make up. Harold also admits that he knew that Amy liked Toadie once the truth about her crush is revealed. Harold is left devastated when the Ramsay Street history book is destroyed, but is surprised when Levi Canning (Richie Morris) and Freya Wozniak (Phoebe Roberts) offer him the first entry in the new history book they have made. Harold goes to Toadie and Melanie's wedding and their reception on Ramsay Street, where he sees Scott and Charlene have returned, and Harold parties with the street's residents.

=== 2023–2025 ===
Two years later, Harold is once again visiting Ramsay Street for Toadie's wedding to Terese Willis (Rebekah Elmaloglou), and staying with Karl and Susan. He begins to experience lapses in memory and moments of confusion, leading Karl to fear he is suffering from dementia. However, it is eventually discovered that his symptoms are being caused by a change in his medication. Harold departs to take a rail trip with Karl. The following year, Terese establishes the Eirini Rising retirement complex in Erinsborough, and Harold decides to purchase a unit and return to the area. He befriends young staff member and high school student JJ Varga-Murphy (Riley Brant). After several incidents occur within the Eirini Rising complex, including his very own tuba being stolen, Harold's granddaughter, Sky, flies down from Port Douglas wanting to take Harold back up north where he is safe. However, Harold refuses to do so as he simply wishes to remain in Erinsborough, given the connections he has with the community. Harold is then voted by the Eirini Rising residents as president, despite not campaigning for the election. Terese and Susan reveal to him that he is a popular, well-respected person amongst the residents. Harold expresses to Toadie his disappointment of him after his separation from Terese, which upsets him. They eventually meet up and Harold apologizes for being so harsh, after Melanie Pearson (Lucinda Cowden) made him realize he had hurt Toadie.

Harold walks Mackenzie down the aisle at her wedding to Haz Devkar (Shiv Palekar). He later attends Toadie's farewells party on Ramsay Street. Harold catches up with Gino Esposito (Shane McNamara) after he moves into Eirene Rising. He supports Terese after she admits drunkenly backing into a gas meter which caused a leak, leaving Gino in hospital. Harold helps Karl and Susan by going out to coffee with Moira Tohu (Robyn Arthur) after she threatens legal action on Eirene Rising, and he discovers that she is lonely after the death of her husband, before convincing her to drop the legal pursuit. He tries to convince the residents to reinstall Terese at Eirene, but is unsuccessful. Due to his loyalty to Terese, the residents replace Harold with Moira as resident representative. Harold attends the Erinsborough Lights Up event and views a picture of Madge in the Lost Loves display.

Harold and Hilary Robinson (Anne Scott-Pendlebury) are later approached by Agnes, and he is shocked by her resemblance to Madge. JJ later arrives after he spotted Agnes and tried to set her up to meet Harold. Harold mistakes her for Madge and she leaves. Harold and Max Ramsay (Ben Jackson) run into Agnes at the cafe and he invites her to look through family history with him and JJ. Harold abruptly leaves when she arrives, finding it too much to handle. Harold later allows her to move into Eirene Rising, and the two catch up in her apartment, where she tells him that she discovered she is Madge's second cousin. Harold and Agnes begin to get along better and explore her connection to the Ramsay family. Harold later moves back to Port Douglas to be closer to Sky. Agnes later goes to stay in the area while her book is being published and meets with Harold.

== Reception ==
Smith has earned various award nominations for his role as Harold. At the 2007 Inside Soap Awards, he was nominated for "Funniest Performance". The following year saw Smith nominated for "Funniest Performance" again and "Best Actor". In 2009, Smith was once again nominated for "Funniest Performance" and "Best Storyline" for Harold's cancer. That same year he was nominated for the "Most Popular Personality" and "Most Popular Actor" Logie Awards.

Television critic Charlie Brooker praised the character of Harold in 2005, saying "Thank God then, for Harold Bishop, who looks precisely the same as he always did – just slightly more so. His is probably the friendliest face on television – a cross between 10 Toytown mayors and a baby". Virgin Media included Harold in their top ten favourite soap characters poll in 2007. They also express that he's become "one of the most popular Ramsey Street residents." After listing his many storylines, Paul Kalina of The Age asked whether there were any plot devices left for the writers to give Harold. He went on to say that Harold's 2008 exit was "a criminally low-key send-off for Neighbours' most colourful and longest-standing cast member. For the best part of two decades, Harold was the moral compass of Ramsay Street, a paragon of the decent-in-a-sliced-white-bread-kind-of-way and nostalgic ideals that distinguishes the squeaky clean Neighbours from a legion of more temperate television soaps." Kalina added that the writers had "better be working up something damned good for when Harold returns." Tony Squires from The Sydney Morning Herald branded Harold a "classically over-the-top character". Ethan Sills of The Spin Off called Harold "the show's God-fearing, tuba-playing version of Alf Stewart".

Ruth Deller of entertainment website Lowculture expressed her sadness over Harold's cancer storyline saying, "Poor Jellybelly. There might have been a little bit of tear-shedding this week at his cancer diagnosis and trip to Madge's grave. We love you Hazza! The current web campaigns to get Ian Smith a golden logie after 20 years on Neighbours also have our support, in a very nominal kind of way." Of his 2009 departure, Deller said "Actor Ian Smith is retiring, which is the kind of behaviour we expect from normal people, not soap stars. He and his wife are going to be 'grey nomads' – the term for Australians who spend their retirement travelling the country in trailer homes. And in a case of art imitating life, that's exactly what Hazza will be doing. [..] To be fair, although I'm sad to see old Jelly Belly depart, it's a nice way to go: much better than him having a second screen death, or moving to live with the whiny Sky. Considering that Harold has had one of the most tragic lives of any Ramsay Street resident (two dead wives, two dead children, a dead grandchild, a dead daughter in law, being missing presumed dead for several years, watching Sky turn from fierce funky teen to moaning nymphomaniac, becoming insane and murderous, being conned by a variety of unscrupulous women and so on), giving him a happy ending is even sweeter." Sarah Megginson of SheKnows placed Harold's departure on her "8 Most Memorable Neighbours Moments".

In 2010, to celebrate Neighbours' 25th anniversary, British Sky Broadcasting profiled twenty-five characters of which they believed were the most memorable in the series' history. Harold was included in the list and they describe him as having no luck in life, they added "Harold Bishop is proof that bad things happen to good people. Harold made Helen Daniels look like a manipulative harpy, and yet the universe still conspired to sweep him out to sea, give him amnesia for several years, and to give his wife Madge terminal cancer. This is all tear-jerking stuff, but the death of his son David's family in a plane crash and Harold subsequently putting a brave face on the situation turned the end of three unloved characters into one of the soap's saddest storylines in years." In April 2012, Harold was immortalised in wax for the Madame Tussauds attraction in Darling Harbour.

Harold was placed at number four on the Huffpost's "35 greatest Neighbours characters of all time" feature. Journalist Adam Beresford described him "a tuba-playing Salvation Army volunteer" and a "prim and proper [...] old-fashioned fusspot who became the heart and soul of Neighbours." They branded Harold's marriage to Madge and friendship with Lou a "classic partnerships". Beresford branded Harold's return from the dead the "best soap resurrection since Bobby Ewing" from Dallas. He concluded that "we still miss old Jelly Belly." In 2021, Harold was placed ninth in a poll ran via soap fansite "Back To The Bay", which asked readers to determine the top ten most popular Neighbours characters. In 2022, Kate Randall from Heat included Harold and Madge in the magazine's top ten Neighbours characters of all time feature. Randall profiled the duo stating "love's old dream, these two were everything we adored about Neighbours." She added that she was "thankful" he returned from the dead "along with his tuba". In a feature profiling the "top 12 iconic Neighbours characters", critic Sheena McGinley of the Irish Independent placed Harold and Madge as joint tenth place. Lorna White from Yours profiled the magazine's "favourite Neighbours characters of all time" which featured Harold on the list. A reporter from The Scotsman included Harold's return from the dead as one of the show's top five moments in its entire history. Sam Strutt of The Guardian compiled a feature counting down the top ten most memorable moments from Neighbours. Strutt listed Harold's disappearance at sea as the second most memorable. A Herald Sun reporter included Harold being widowed and his 2015 return in their "Neighbours' 30 most memorable moments" feature. They also included his 1991 lost at sea departure, of which they opined "to this day, the most talked about exit on Neighbours."
