= Anne Charleston =

Australian-born actress (born 1942)

- Born: 30 December 1942 (age 83); Melbourne, Victoria, Australia
- Occupation: Actress
- Years active: 1955–present
- Known for: Neighbours; Emmerdale; Crossroads
- Notable work: Prisoner; Bellbird; Class of '74; Possession

Anne Charleston (born 30 December 1942) is an Australian-born actress prominent in television, radio and theatre, notable for her career locally and in both England and Ireland.

Charleston is best known for her television roles in the soap opera Neighbours, joining the cast in 1986, as matriarch Madge Bishop (1986-1992, 1996-2001, 2015, 2022), alongside co-star Ian Smith who played her husband Harold Bishop. She returned to the series briefly in 2025, playing a different character, Agnes Adair.

She was subsequently based in the United Kingdom and appeared in the British soap opera Emmerdale playing Lily Butterfield from 2006 until 2009. She has also featured in numerous British theatre productions and pantomimes.

Charleston became known for her work in the cult classic series Prisoner, in which she played three different characters between 1979 and 1984.

She began her career on stage in the mid-1950s, before moving into small screen roles in the early 1960s, appearing in various telemovies and serials including several guest roles in various Crawford Productions dramas.

She had recurring roles in many early local soap operas including the ABC series Bellbird, Class of 74 and briefly Number 96.

== Career ==
=== Television and film ===
==== Early roles ====
Charleston became well-known in Australia from various guest roles in the Crawfords police dramas including Homicide, Division 4 and Matlock Police. Other appearances included guest roles in other adventure series produced by the company, such as Hunter (1967) and Ryan (1973), as well as Network Ten-produced police drama The Long Arm (1971). She was in TV plays such as Man of Destiny and The Shifting Heart (1968).

She had continuing roles in soap operas Bellbird and Class of '75, and appeared in Number 96 as a deranged woman named Stella who kidnapped Alf (James Elliott) and Lucy Sutcliffe's (Elisabeth Kirkby) baby in late 1975. She also appeared in the feature film version of Bellbird, Country Town (1971), playing a different character from that which she had played in the series. In 1972, she appeared in an episode from the anthology series A Time for Love as Rosemary.

==== Prisoner ====
In the late 1970s and the 1980s she became internationally renowned thanks to several small roles in soap opera Prisoner. She briefly played the original Lorraine, the brusque daughter of released prisoner Jeanette "Mum" Brooks (Mary Ward) in 1979, and mother of Judith-Ann. The role was recast in subsequent appearances of the character, but Charleston returned to the series portraying a policewoman in 1983 then the recurring role of Deidre Kean, mother of prison toughie Reb Kean (Janet Andrewartha), in 1984.

The role was intended to be a long term character in Prisoner; however, in 1985, Grundys cast her in a leading regular role in a new soap opera, Possession, however the series was cancelled by the Nine network later that same year due to low ratings.

==== Neighbours ====
In 1986, Charleston was cast as Madge Mitchell (later Bishop) in the Australian soap opera Neighbours. Madge was added to the series when it was relaunched by Network Ten, after cancelation from the Seven Network. The series became popular both locally and the United Kingdom. Through the series Charleston became internationally recognised, and won a Penguin Award in 1987 for Best Performance By an Actress in a Series/Serial. In 1989, she and Smith recorded the Christmas song "Old Fashioned Christmas" which was released in the UK.

In 1989, Charleston took on the role of another 'Madge', Madge Allsop in an episode of The Dame Edna Experience on ITV in the UK, when Dame Edna Everage asked Doctor Christiaan Barnard to give her bridesmaid a face lift. Dame Edna did not like Madge's new face, so asked the surgeon to reverse the operation, restoring Emily Perry to the role.

In 1992, Charleston left Neighbours and emigrated to the Republic of Ireland. Four years later she accepted an offer to return to Neighbours, reprising the role. In her second stint in the series, Charleston observed that Madge had been transformed from being bold and fiery to a more meek and passive character, a change that led to her ultimate decision to leave the series in 2000. Her final episode - Madge's death from pancreatic cancer - was broadcast in Australia during April 2001. Charleston later admitted that she did not miss playing Madge.

She returned to Neighbours in 2015 alongside co-star Ian Smith to commemorate its 30th anniversary. Charleston also appeared in a documentary celebrating the anniversary titled Neighbours 30th: The Stars Reunite, which aired in Australia and the UK in March 2015.

Following the news of Neighbours' cancellation, Charleston reprised her role of Madge, imagined by Susan Kennedy as to how she might look if still alive, in the show's then-final episode, which aired on 28 July 2022.

On 2 December 2024, it was announced that Charleston would be returning to Neighbours in a new role as part of Harold's departure storyline, following Ian Smith's cancer diagnosis. She debuted as Agnes Adair in March 2025 during Neighbours' 40th anniversary week, and was subsequently added to the show's opening credits.

==== After Neighbours ====
After leaving Neighbours for the first time, Charleston lived in Ireland for several years, and returned there after leaving the series again in 2001. With the high levels of popularity enjoyed by Neighbours in the UK, Charleston relaunched her career there. She undertook theatre and radio work in the UK and Ireland, and was a regular performer in pantomime. In 2001, she appeared on Lily Savage's Blankety Blank.

Charleston played the lead role of Dossa in Caroline Ahern's comedy series Dossa and Joe, which was filmed in Sydney. She then played the regular role of Betty Waddell in the relaunched series of Crossroads in 2003. In 2004, she was a contestant in the second series of the Living TV reality television show, I'm Famous and Frightened!

In 2005, she had cosmetic surgery performed on her neck, live on British television, on the Channel 5 programme Cosmetic Surgery Live. In the same year, she also "regressed into a previous life", as a poor Irish farm girl, when she appeared in the programme Have I Been Here Before?.

In late 2006, Charleston joined the cast of Emmerdale, originating the character of Lily Butterfield, the estranged sister of Edna Birch (Shirley Stelfox), who arrives to attend her great niece Eve's wedding blessing. Of her new role, Charleston said: "I am over the moon to be joining one of my favourite soaps. I am delighted to be playing such a fantastic character." Series Producer Kathleen Beedles added: "We are thrilled to confirm that Anne will be playing the character of Lily. Viewers can expect to see sparks fly when Edna and Lily are reunited and we are looking forward to welcoming Anne on-set." Charleson's first taping day was on Monday 25 September 2006, and she first appeared on screen on Friday 3 November 2006. She appeared in only three episodes. The character returned in October 2007 for a four-month run, and returned again in 2008 on a regular contract. Charleston quit in April 2009 and the character was subsequently written out of the serial and made her last appearance on 3 August 2009.

In August 2012, Charleston was a contestant on BBC TV's Celebrity Masterchef. In 2013, Charleston played the mother-in-law of prisoner Liz Birdsworth in the Prisoner remake, Wentworth. The role marked the first time Charleston had appeared in Australian television since leaving Neighbours in 2001, having mostly worked in the UK.

=== Theatre ===
Charleston has appeared in theatre roles both locally and internationally; her theatre credits go back to the mid-1950s

Charleston enjoyed a busy career acting in the Australian theatre. With St. Martin's Theatre she acted in Wrong Side of the Park, The Irregular Verb, To Love, Angels in Love, A Far Country, The Anniversary, Invitation to a March, Eden House, The Cavern, Have you Any Dirty Washing Mother Dear, Blithe Spirit and Children's Day.

She also appeared in J C Williamson's Woman in a Dressing Gown starring Googie Withers, Juggler's Three for the Melbourne Theatre Company Workshop, and The Secretary Bird starring Patrick Macnee. Other theatre includes Busybody, Port Wine, Night of the Ding Dong, Burst of Summer, Murder in the Cathedral, The Rivals, The Tower, Everyman, Antigone, The Man of Destiny, Otherwise Engaged and The Shifting Heart.

She starred in Aladdin at Belfast Grand Opera House in 1995–1996 with Rod Hull and Emu. In March and April 2004, she appeared in a production of The Vagina Monologues at The Playhouse, Weston-super-Mare and Theatre Royal Bath.

In January 2010, it was announced that Charleston would be joining the touring production of Calendar Girls as Jessie (Miss January).

In July 2012, it was revealed that Charleston would appear alongside Mischa Barton in an Irish stage production of Steel Magnolias, playing Ouiser Boudreaux in the production. It was due to premiere at the Gaiety Theatre, Dublin in September, and be followed by a nationwide tour.

In 2012, Charleston toured the UK in a production of The Cemetery Club alongside Anita Harris, Shirley Anne Field and Peter Ellis.

The 2014–15 pantomime season saw Charleston playing the Fairy Godmother in Cinderella at the Redditch Palace Theatre.

== Filmography ==
=== Film ===
Year	Title	Role	Type
1959	Night of the Ding-Dong	Louise	TV movie
1961	Burst of Summer	Sally Blake	TV movie
1964	Everyman	Beauty	TV movie
1965	Otherwise Engaged	Pamela	TV movie
1965	The Tower		TV movie
1966	Antigone	Ismene	TV movie
1969	2000 Weeks	Will's Mother	Feature film
1971	Country Town	Dorothy 'Dot' Atkins	Feature film
2022	Three Thousand Years of Longing	Fanny	Feature film

=== Television ===
Year	Title	Role	Type
1962; 1964	Consider Your Verdict	Lucinda Morell	TV series, 2 episodes
1965–73	Homicide	Sandra Martin / Elaine Mitchell / Leigh Gardiner / Anne Davies / Sue Tait / Alison Young / Judith Lambert / Irene Taylor / Alice Baker / Jan Whelan / Eva Kemp (as Anne Charlestone)	TV series, 11 episodes
1966	Australian Playhouse	Yvette	TV series, 1 episode
1967	Love and War	Guest role	TV series, 1 episode
1968	Hunter	Patricia French	TV series, 2 episodes
1968	Contrabandits	Judy	TV series, 1 episode
1970–74	Division 4	Lynn Black / Jill Ferris / Estelle Phillips / Dr. Berman / Woman / Grace	TV series, 6 episodes
1970	The Long Arm	Sybil Duckworth	TV series, 1 episode
1971	Bellbird	Wendy Robinson	TV series, 528 episodes
1972	A Time for Love	Rosemary	TV series, 1 episode
1972; 1973	Matlock Police	Carol Anderson / Sal Stevens	TV series, 2 episodes
1974	Ryan	Samantha Moss	TV series, 1 episode
1975	Class of '74	Faith Adams	TV series, 98 episodes
1975	The Company Men	Guest role	TV miniseries, 2 episodes
1975	Two Way Mirror	Gloria Lawrence	TV pilot, 1 episode
1975	Number 96	"Mad" Stella	TV series
1976	The Sullivans	Guest role	TV series
1978	Case for the Defence	Natalie O'Brian	TV series, 1 episode
1978-81	Cop Shop	Alison Chambers / Ann Gregory / Jan Morris / Alison	TV series, 9 episodes
1979, 1984	Prisoner	Recurring role: Lorraine Watkins / Guest roles: Policewoman / Deidre Kean	TV series, 22 episodes
1979	Twenty Good Years	Melinda Fielding	TV series, 20 episodes
1979	Skyways	Wendy Stewart	TV series, 2 episodes
1980	Timelapse	Dell	TV series
1983	A Descant for Gossips	Margaret	TV movie
1985	Possession	Elizabeth Macarthur	TV series, 31 episodes
1985	I Live with Me Dad	Mrs. Harkness	TV movie
1986–92; 1996–01; 2015; 2022; 2025	Neighbours	Madge Mitchell/Ramsay/Bishop / Agnes Adair	TV series
2002	Dossa and Joe	Dossa Bailey	TV miniseries, 6 episodes
2003	Crossroads	Betty Waddell	TV series UK
2006–09	Emmerdale	Lily Butterfield	TV series UK, 178 episodes
2011	Holby City	Sandy Eaton	TV series UK, 1 episode
2011	Justin's House	Auntie Justina	TV series UK, 1 episode
2013	Wentworth	Celeste Donaldson	TV series, 1 episode
2013	Doctors	Mrs. Anstee	TV series UK, 1 episode
2019–20	Bloom	Loris Webb	TV series, 8 episodes
2021	The Newsreader	Avis	TV series, 1 episode
2022	Wayward Strand	Ida Vaughan (voice)	Video Game
2023	Crazy Fun Park	Baba Vanga	TV series, 4 episodes
2024	Fake	Shirley Burt	8 episodes

== Theatre ==
Year	Title	Role	Type
1995-96	Aladdin		Belfast Grand Opera House
2010	Calendar Girls	Jessie (Miss January)	Tour
2012	Steel Magnolias	Ouiser Boudreaux	Gaiety Theatre, Dublin & Irish national tour
2012	The Cemetery Club		UK tour
2014–15	Cinderella	Fairy Godmother	Redditch Palace Theatre
