= Ian Smith (actor) =

Australian actor, television producer and screenwriter (born 1938)

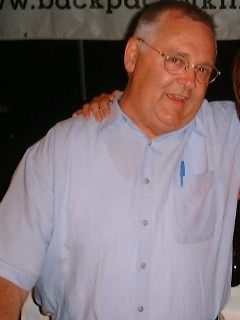
- Smith in 2001
- Born: 19 June 1938 (age 87); Melbourne, Victoria, Australia
- Other names: Iain Smith
- Occupations: Actor; television producer; screenwriter
- Years active: 1943–1944; 1958–2025
- Known for: Neighbours as Harold Bishop
- Notable work: Prisoner (known internationally as Prisoner: Cell Block H) - Executive Producer Screenwriter - Actor

Ian Smith (born 19 June 1938) is a retired Australian actor, television producer and screenwriter.

Smith appeared in roles for Crawford Productions, before taking a regular role in rural series Bellbird, and then working as a producer, screenwriter and actor on the cult series Prisoner. He starred in the soap opera Neighbours as Harold Bishop from 1987 until 1991, when the series was taken over by Network Ten. He returned to the role in 1996 and continued as a series regular until 2009, with subsequent guest appearances in 2011, 2015 and 2022.

In 2023, Smith said he was pleased to have been invited to make guest appearances on Neighbours, but wished to retire eventually. On 2 December 2024, it was announced that he would depart Neighbours again after he revealed that he had been diagnosed with terminal cancer.

== Early life ==
Smith was born to Peggy Kline in 1938 and first appeared in theatre as a child in 1943 and 1944, resuming his career in the late 1950s.

== Career ==
=== Early career ===
Smith having been a theatre performer of some years started appearing in television roles in the late 1960s with guesting roles in drama series for Crawford Productions, in police dramas Homicide, Division 4, Matlock Police and Bluey.

After having appeared in numerous guest parts in Division 4. he got his major break gaining a regular role in television serial Bellbird; after this he made a guest appearance in serial The Box in 1975.

Smith subsequently worked at Reg Grundy Productions with guest parts in there TV drama Glenview High and Chopper Squad

=== Prisoner ===
Smith worked concurrently behind the scenes with Grundy's as associate producer and script editor of cult serial Prisoner, but also had a semi-regular role in the series as head of the Corrections Department, Ted Douglas.

Smith was not scheduled to play Ted Douglas, but the actor who had been contracted for the role did not show up on the day of filming and, given his acting experience, the crew said Smith should change hats and get in front of the camera.

=== Neighbours ===
Smith became famous through his portrayal of bumbling Harold Bishop in the soap opera Neighbours from 1987 to 1991, returning in 1996. He switched to recurring status from 2008 to 2009, becoming one of the program's longest-serving characters after 2,132 episodes. For his portrayal of Harold, Smith received a nomination for a Gold Logie Award in 2009. In 1989, while he and co-star Anne Charleston were appearing in pantomime in the UK, they recorded the Christmas song "Old Fashioned Christmas".

In December 2010, Ryan Moloney revealed to TV Week that Smith would be returning to Neighbours in 2011. Smith appeared for six weeks from May 2011. Smith returned to Neighbours in 2015, with former co-star Anne Charleston for the 30th anniversary. He also appeared in a documentary celebrating the anniversary titled Neighbours 30th: The Stars Reunite, which aired in Australia and the UK in March 2015.

In April 2018, Smith admitted that he should have left Neighbours sooner and admits he felt typecast. Smith admitted "he wasn't aware he was becoming 'Harold from Neighbours while he was on the show" and joked that when he auditioned for other roles he would be told "Oh you were in Neighbours, you were Harold, you couldn't possibly be a murdering paedophile".

In February 2022, Laura-Jayne Tyler of Inside Soap reported that Smith would be reprising his role to play a part in the show's finale. Smith has filmed a part in an upcoming film titled Residence, playing Mike the Thaumaturge.

On 2 December 2024, it was announced that Smith would depart Neighbours after he was diagnosed with terminal cancer, with executive producer Jason Herbison saying that they would write the character out. Charleston returned for Smith's last Neighbours appearance but as a new character.

=== I'm a Celebrity ===
Smith featured in Series 11 of I'm a Celebrity... Get Me Out of Here! to set the camp-mates challenges. He did not join the camp-mates.

=== Theatre ===
Smith has also worked in theatre since the late 1950s, including for companies J. C. Williamson's, Tivoli and Melbourne Theatre Company, in roles in productions Merry Widow, Camelot, My Fair Lady, Fiddler on the Roof, Antony and Cleopatra.

== Personal life ==
Although Smith was brought up as a Roman Catholic, he said in a 2008 interview that he was an atheist.

On 2 December 2024, Smith announced that he had been diagnosed with terminal lung cancer, resulting in his final departure from Neighbours in early 2025. On 30 December 2024, he said that his tumour had shrunk in size and was still being treated.

== Filmography ==
=== Film ===
Year	Title	Role	Notes
TBA	Residence	Mike the Thaumaturge	Film
2009	Remembering Nigel	Himself	Film
1997	The Last of the Ryans	Sir Arthur Rylah	Film
1993	Body Melt	Dr. Carrera	Feature film

=== Television ===
Year	Title	Role	Notes
2021	How to Stay Married	Father Michael	TV series
2010	Underbelly: The Golden Mile	Ken Wallis	TV series
2009	The Jesus Spoon	Buck Senior	
2007	Little Britain Down Under	Himself	Special thanks
2000	Neighbours Revealed	Himself; Harold Bishop	TV special
1996	The Genie from Down Under	Race Judge	TV series
1994	Blue Heelers	Clive Burton	TV series
1987–91, 1996–2009, 2011, 2015, 2022, 2023–2025	Neighbours	Harold Bishop	TV series
1981	I Can Jump Puddles	Mr. Slade	TV series
1979–86	Prisoner	Ted Douglas, Rev. Potter, Policeman	TV series (also writer, script editor & associate producer)
1978	Chopper Squad		TV series
1977	Glenview High	Rocky	TV series
1977	Bluey	Sen. Det. Davidson	TV series
1975	Division 4	Mike Chapman	TV series
1975	Matlock Police	Barry	TV series
1975	Quality of Mercy		TV series
1974	Ryan		TV series
1974	Alpha Scorpio	Unknown	TV series
1972	Homicide	Johnny Reid	TV series
1971–73	Matlock Police	Larry Fisher; Rick Cameron, David Wishart, Const. Graham Browning, Estate Agent, John Roberts	TV series
1971	Homicide	Michael Edmunds	TV series
1969	Detective	Dick Spencer	
1967	Belbird	Russell Ashwood	TV series
1966	Homicide	Ray Fox	TV series

=== Other appearances ===
Year	Title	Role	Notes
2018	Hughesy, We Have a Problem	Himself (Celebrity Problem segment)	TV series
2015	Neighbours 30th: The Stars Reunite	Himself	TV special
2011	I'm a Celebrity... Get Me Out of Here!	Special guest	TV series, season 11
2009	Talkin' 'Bout Your Generation	Himself	TV series
2005	Australian Story	Himself	TV series
2002	It Shouldn't Happen to a... Soapstar	Himself	
2001	The Big Breakfast	Guest	TV series
1992	Noel's House Party	Himself	TV series
1991	Pebble Mill at One	Himself	TV series
1991	That's Showbusiness	Himself	TV series
1990	Happy Birthday, Coronation Street	Himself	TV special

== Theatre ==
- Merry Widow
- Camelot
- My Fair Lady
- Fiddler on the Roof
- Antony and Cleopatra.
