= Todd Landers =

Fictional character from Neighbours

- Neighbours character
- Portrayed by: Kristian Schmid
- Duration: 1988–1992
- First appearance: 15 February 1988
- Last appearance: 14 July 1992
- Introduced by: Reg Watson
In-universe information
- Occupation: Student at Erinsborough High
- Father: Bob Landers
- Mother: Annette Landers
- Sisters: Katie Landers
- Daughters: Hope Gottlieb
- Grandfathers: Rhys Marshall
- Aunts: Beverly Marshall

Todd Landers is a fictional character from the Australian soap opera Neighbours, played by Kristian Schmid. He made his first appearance during the episode broadcast on 15 February 1988. Todd was introduced along with his younger sister Katie Landers (Sally Jensen). They were given an instant connection to the show through their aunt, Beverly Marshall (Lisa Armytage). After choosing to leave the serial in 1991, Schmid suggested to the producers that his character should be killed-off, and Todd died in the episode broadcast on 13 July 1992. He reappeared as a spirit in the following episode.

== Casting ==
Schmid was 12 years old when decided to sign himself up for an acting course in Melbourne. Three weeks later, Jan Russ, Neighbours' casting director, came to the school to hold auditions for the show. Russ said she was looking for a teenage boy, around 14 or 15, to play the role of Todd Landers. Schmid asked to audition and he was successfully cast in the role of Todd.

Schmid remained with Neighbours until his character was killed off at the age of 17. Schmid revealed that he had suggested that Todd was killed. He said "I spoke to the producers about a year before I left the show. The fact they gave me such a dramatic exit was what I wanted. It's flattering on a show like that". After his character's death, Schmid made one last appearance as Todd in the following episode.

== Characterisation ==
Todd is Beverly Marshall's "cheekily independent nephew". He and his sister, Katie Landers (Sally Jensen), come to live with their aunt Beverly Marshall (Lisa Armytage) in Ramsay Street to escape their bullying father, who believes that his children should pay for his drinking habit. They become adopted members of Beverly and her husband, Jim Robinson's (Alan Dale) household. Todd is initially overprotective towards Katie and cynical. He later becomes a "conscientious student" who is easily distracted by his girlfriends.

Writers paired Todd with fellow student Cody Willis (Amelia Frid). Frid told Dawn Bebe from BIG! that Cody is "flirty and does her best to chase boys – especially Todd". Frid was embarrassed by her character's actions. Schmid told a reporter from the magazine that their first on-screen kiss was really "embarrassing" because of the many cameramen watching. Producers established a relationship between Todd and Phoebe Bright (Simone Robertson) and they lose their virginity to each other. Phoebe falls pregnant and the couple are later seen discussing their options. They decide that Phoebe should have an abortion, but Todd changes his mind.

== Storylines ==
Todd and his sister Katie Landers accompany family friend Hilary Robinson, to their aunt Beverly Marshall's wedding to Hilary's cousin, Jim Robinson. Todd is dismissive when Jim's children Paul Robinson (Stefan Dennis) and Lucy Robinson (Sasha Close) try to communicate with him and Katie. Shortly after the ceremony and before the beginning of Paul's vow renewal to his wife Gail Robinson (Fiona Corke), Todd steals Hilary's car keys to retrieve his and Katie's bags from the car. Todd and Katie run away but are eventually found by Jim's son Scott Robinson (Jason Donovan) and his wife, Charlene Robinson (Kylie Minogue).

Jim and Beverley agree to sacrifice their honeymoon to look after Todd and Katie and let them stay at Number 26 with them while Bob (Robin Harrison; Bruce Kilpatrick) and Annette (Tania Uren) work through their problems. During his first few months in Erinsborough, Todd manages to provoke the ire of local residents Harold Bishop (Ian Smith) and Nell Mangel (Vivean Gray). Later in the year, Todd finds himself at odds with street kid and graffiti artist Nick Page (Mark Stevens) who has previously graffitied Jim's fence and things are not helped when Emma Gordon (Tamsin West), Todd's crush, develops an attraction to Nick. Eventually, Todd softens towards Nick when his grandmother dies and he moves in with the Robinsons.

After a babysitting blunder, which leads to Jamie Clarke (S.J. Dey) nearly drowning, Todd runs away from home and begins living in a squat with a petty criminal named Skinner (Mat Stevenson) who forces him into crime. Nick, acting on a hunch, follows Todd and Skinner who are about to rob a warehouse, which backfires, resulting in Nick's arrest. Racked with guilt, Todd returns home and confesses to get Nick off the hook, resulting in Todd being cautioned. The stress of Todd's recent behaviour causes Helen Daniels (Anne Haddy), Jim's mother-in-law to have a stroke.

While staying with Paul and Gail at Number 22, Todd comes face to face with Skinner again who forces his way in and threatens to hurt Katie if Todd does not comply with the theft of the VCR. Gail returns home and rescues the Landers children, Skinner bolts with Todd in hot pursuit and is collared by Nick and eventually arrested. Katie tells Todd that Bob is in Erinsborough and initially disbelieves her until he phones Annette, who confirms he walked out two weeks earlier. Todd talks to Bob and eventually obtains a confession about trying to extort money out of Helen. Bob tries to leave but Todd catches him and Bob suggests he come up North with him. Todd is about to go with Bob, but Jim and Beverly (now Shaunna O'Grady) arrive and stop him.

Todd's meets Alison Ryder (Thea McLeod) on the bus on the way back from Adelaide and is totally smitten with her. Alison stays with the Robinsons, but when Helen finds $30 missing, Alison is accused of being a thief. Todd refuses to believe the accusation, and decides to go back to Adelaide with Alison when her visit ends. On the day Todd and Alison are supposed to leave, Todd discovers the brooch Helen's late husband Bill gave her for her 21st birthday in Alison's bag. Todd confronts Alison and she is rude to him, insisting her actions are no big deal, Jim drives her to the bus station and she is never seen again.

When fellow student Melissa Jarrett (Jade Amenta) begins taking piano lessons from Hilary, she is attracted to Todd, who is initially shy and begins avoiding her. Melissa is unimpressed but eventually softens when Todd tells her about his experience with Alison. Todd and Melissa begin dating, but he receives a phone call from Annette, who believes she is able to cope with Todd and Katie now. Todd is allowed to stay in Erinsborough while Katie goes back to Adelaide. Melissa's father, Ben (David Ravenswood) takes a dislike to Todd, who he feels is leading his daughter astray after misconstruing a situation with Todd being in Melissa's room.

The Jarretts go to America for several months, leaving Todd devastated. Cody, a classmate of Todd and Melissa's at Erinsborough High takes more than a passing interest in Todd and stages a Hawaiian-themed party, which is a ruse to have Todd as the only guest in order to seduce him. After Christmas, Melissa returns to find Todd and Cody kissing passionately and promptly breaks up with Todd. Todd is incensed when Melissa begins flirting with Hilary's son Matt Robinson (Ashley Paske), in order to make him jealous.

On Todd's 16th birthday, he befriends Josh Anderson (Jeremy Angerson), who moves to Erinsborough from Mildura with his parents who have bought the newsagent's on Anson's Corner. Todd, Melissa, Josh and Cody begin hanging around together as a regular teen group. However, the dynamic changes when the respective couplings of Todd and Cody and Josh and Melissa begin to realise they have feelings for each other. All four parties manage to resolve things.

Todd decides he wants a trail bike and eventually puts down a deposit for it, but Beverly refuses which puts even further strain on the already fraught marriage between her and Jim. Todd reluctantly moves into the flat behind the surgery when Jim and Beverly separate. Todd begins hanging out with petty criminal Gary "Boof" Head (Stephen Hall), much to the annoyance of his friends. After a failed raid on a bike yard, Todd is forced to confess and then is later attacked by Boof, but Josh comes to Todd's aid.

When Cody's parents, Doug Willis (Terence Donovan) and Pam Willis (Sue Jones) buy Number 28 from Des Clarke (Paul Keane), Todd is thrilled at the prospect of having his girlfriend living next door. However, Beverly's second miscarriage is the final straw for her marriage to Jim, which results in Beverly leaving for Perth but not before taking Todd back to Adelaide. Todd is heartbroken and later makes a return to Erinsborough and hides out in Cody's room until being caught by Pam.

Jim talks to Annette and an agreement is made that Todd can stay in Erinsborough. After a misunderstanding over a sex education class, Todd and Cody are forbidden from seeing each other and agree to run away together. Cody becomes ill with fever and is forced to return home when Doug catches up with them. Todd decides to keep on running. After three months of running, Todd finally returns home after visiting Helen in hospital after she suffers a fall at the hotel she and Josh stayed at while looking for Todd. Principal Dorothy Burke (Maggie Dence), suggests Todd repeats Year 10 after missing three months of school, but eventually relents and decides to let Todd join his friends in Year 11.

Todd's relationship with Cody is put to the test when Dorothy puts Cody forward for a study programme in America. The couple decide to split and date other people. Cody dates Darren Wood (Troy Beckwith) and Todd begins dating Emma again. This is only temporary, as Todd and Cody realise they love each other in the days leading up to Cody's departure. They agree to keep in touch via long distance, but several months later, Cody writes to Todd telling him she has found someone else.

At Christmas, Todd elects to stay in Erinsborough rather than going to Surfers Paradise, Queensland with Josh, Lucy and Cody's brother Brad Willis (Scott Michaelson). Todd is shocked when Bob makes a reappearance in his life, having escaped from prison and reluctantly agrees to hide him at the recently vacated Number 32. Helen discovers this and is angry but decides to let Bob spend Christmas Day with them as most of everyone is away. On Christmas Day, Todd and Glen Donnelly (Richard Huggett), Jim's illegitimate son are called by Paul to the Lassiter's complex to help fix the roof. Glen slips and Todd tries desperately to hold onto him but fails to resulting in Glen being injured. Paul tries to buy Todd off with a car to get Todd to change his story in court when Glen sues, but Todd refuses.

Todd later finds himself falling for Phoebe Bright, Josh's girlfriend after she reveals how she truly feels about him. When Todd and Phoebe's romance is exposed, there is a strained atmosphere between Todd and Josh, who has been living with the Robinsons for the last year. Things are resolved before Josh returns home to Mildura. Todd and Phoebe later begin sleeping together which is met with disapproval by Jim and Dorothy. Phoebe later falls pregnant and Todd vows to support stand by her and the baby by dropping out of school and finding work. Todd visits Bob in prison, who tells him marrying Phoebe would be a mistake as he and Annette married young. Phoebe ultimately decides to have an abortion which Todd tries to accept, but cannot.

Todd takes a bus to the clinic, but the bus breaks down. Upon spotting a taxi, he runs across a busy highway to hail it, however, is distracted as the taxi moves off and is hit by an oncoming van. Paramedics arrive and Todd is taken to hospital, Jim receives a phone call from the police and he and Paul rush to Erinsborough Hospital. Jim uses Paul's car phone to call the clinic to contact Dorothy and Phoebe about Todd's accident and they race there.

Todd later wakes up in hospital after a successful splenectomy. He appears to have recovered and talks to Phoebe about the future and tells her she is beautiful when he suddenly goes into cardiac arrest due to a ruptured artery the doctors missed. Despite efforts to resuscitate him, Todd dies as Jim, Phoebe and Dorothy look on. The day after his death, Todd appears as a spirit in Phoebe's mirror telling her he will always be there for her and the baby, who he says will be a girl. Phoebe later gives birth to their daughter, Hope.

== Reception ==
Telecommunications network Orange profiled past Neighbours characters, in this feature they describe Todd's most memorable moment as: "Being the youngest character in Neighbours history to die. Seventeen-year-old Todd was hit by a van while running to a clinic to stop girlfriend Phoebe having an abortion."

In 2007, Australian newspaper the Herald Sun placed Todd's death at number ten on their list of Neighbours Top Ten moments. In 2018, Joe Julians of Digital Spy branded Todd's exit as "still one of Neighbours' saddest deaths". In 2020, Adam Beresford writing for HuffPost opined that Todd, Melissa, Cody and Josh formed one of the "show's best teen groups". A Herald Sun reporter included Todd's death in their "Neighbours' 30 most memorable moments" feature.

In a Time Out feature profiling "best soap opera moments", British playwright Alice Birch chose Todd being hit by the van as the most memorable. She recalled being banned from watching the show as a child after Todd's death made her cry for two days. Donna Hay from What's on TV included Todd and Phoebe in their "marriages made in heaven" feature. Hay noted that their romance "should have had a happy ending" but writers decided otherwise. In May 1993, TVTimes featured a story about their readers' beliefs that too much sex was featured on television. In their soap opera section, they stated "many people worry about sex in early-evening soaps." They included a viewer complaint from a pensioner who thought that "young kids" in Neighbours, such as Todd and Phoebe having sex was "bad".
