= Episode 400 (Neighbours) =

- Neighbours episode
- Episode no.: Season 2 Episode 400
- Directed by: Mark Callan
- Written by: David Phillips
- Original air date: 11 December 1986
- Running time: 22 minutes

Guest appearance
- Syd Conabere as Dan Ramsay

Episode chronology
← Previous; Episode 399	Next → Episode 401

Episode 400 of the Australian television soap opera Neighbours was broadcast on Network Ten on 11 December 1986. It serves as the serial's season finale and first Christmas episode. It was written by David Phillips and directed by Mark Callan. The plot focuses on a boxing match between Shane Ramsay (Peter O'Brien) and Mike Young (Guy Pearce), who are competing for the affections of Jane Harris (Annie Jones). The build up to the match also reignites a feud between the Ramsay and Robinson families. When Clive Gibbons (Geoff Paine), who is refereeing the fight, is briefly knocked out, he dreams of a Christmas fantasy land featuring his friends and neighbours.

The episode was conceived after Network Ten executives decided to keep the show on the air beyond the end of the ratings period. As Neighbours was billed as "light and fun", the writers took the opportunity to create a fantasy sequence in the episode. They also wanted to avoid finishing the season with a cliffhanger, which had yet to become a feature of the serial. Producer Phil East said the episode would give viewers a "gentle, happy ending to the year." The dream sequence sees the cast take on the roles of colourful pantomime characters, with Clive as Father Christmas. Episode 400 received a mixed reception for its dream sequence. It has been branded both "bizarre" and "surreal", and has been included in several features about memorable soap moments. Stacia Briggs from the Eastern Daily Press said the episode "mimicked taking hallucinogenic drugs".

== Plot ==
Paul (Stefan Dennis) and Jim Robinson (Alan Dale) make a bet about the outcome of a boxing match between Shane Ramsay (Peter O'Brien) and Mike Young (Guy Pearce). Outside in the street, Dan Ramsay (Syd Conabere) and Jim argue about their families. Madge Mitchell (Anne Charleston), Clive Gibbons (Geoff Paine) and Mike intervene, and Clive suggests they get together to talk things through. Helen Daniels (Anne Haddy) and Madge also fall out while discussing their family histories. At Number 24, Clive admits the boxing match was his idea, but he never intended for it to take place. The training was supposed to be an outlet for Shane and Mike, who have been arguing over Jane Harris (Annie Jones). Dan continues taunting Mike and the Robinsons. Mike calls him a liar and Des Clarke (Paul Keane) has to separate him and Shane. The gym is already being used at lunchtime. Clive tells Shane that he should just shake hands with Mike. Charlene Mitchell (Kylie Minogue) agrees, pointing out that Jane hates all the fighting. Shane tells her that the fight is not about Jane anymore, but rather about family. Jane arrives to ask Shane to call off the match, but Dan tells her that no Ramsay has ever walked away from a fight. She says that neither Shane or Mike will make her the excuse for it and leaves.

At the gym, Clive reads up on the rules and tells Daphne Clarke (Elaine Smith) that he will stop the match as soon as he can. In the changing rooms, Dan keeps encouraging Shane to beat Mike. Helen arrives with Lucy Robinson (Kylie Flinker), and Jane tells Charlene that she still hopes the fight will be called off. As Shane and Mike enter the ring, Lucy calls Paul a traitor for supporting Shane, while Scott and Charlene argue. Clive points out that it is nearly Christmas and asks that they all call it quits, but his plea is ignored. Susan Cole (Gloria Ajenstat) rings the bell to start, but Clive gets in the way and is struck twice by Shane and Mike, knocking him out. Clive dreams that he is Father Christmas, while his friends are various pantomime characters, who tell him what they want for Christmas. Paul appears and carries Susan off, before the grotto ceiling falls in and Clive wakes up. Jane pleads for the fight to end and Mike and Shane agree. Helen gets Paul and Jim to donate money to the children's party. Clive and Susan make plans for Christmas. Lucy asks Dan if there is any hard feelings and he says no, before leaving together.

== Production ==
The 400th episode of Neighbours also serves as the 1986 season finale, which producers decided to mark with a Christmas special. Producer Phil East told Stephen Cook of TV Week that the show would normally come off the air at the end of the ratings period in early November, but Network Ten executives decided to keep it on air for as long as possible, which enabled them to do a Christmas story for the first time. In the lead up to the episode, the residents of Ramsay Street are drawn into the drama of a love triangle involving Shane Ramsay, Mike Young and Jane Harris. Upon realising that the whole thing has got out of hand, Clive Gibbons jokingly suggests the boys fight for Jane. This leads to the arrangement of a boxing match between the pair, which kicks off the episode. The plot also sees a revival of the Ramsay/Robinson feud, as they take opposing sides ahead of the fight.

East revealed that Clive, who is acting as the referee, gets knocked out during the fight and has a dream featuring all the characters. He explained that as the show is "basically light and fun", the writers discussed what they could do to round out the year and took the opportunity to create a fantasy sequence. He pointed out that unlike fellow soap Sons and Daughters, Neighbours had never featured cliffhangers and they wanted to stick to that "tradition". East stated: "It will be a very gentle, happy ending to the year. It will still be quite a peak without having someone at death's door." Writers for TV Week later observed that from 1986 until 1990, Neighbours usually finished the season with "a happy ending and a good old-fashioned Christmas singalong".

The dream sequence features the cast in "a Christmas fairyland" in which they take on the roles of colourful, "totally over the top" characters. As Clive drifts into the dream, he finds himself as Father Christmas, while the Ramsay Street residents also appear in the fantasy. A reporter for TV Radio Extra wrote "Some of them viewers will recognise instantly; others will be harder to identify. They have never been seen like this before." Lucy Robinson is an Elf, Scott Robinson is a Tin Soldier, Charlene Mitchell is a Clockwork Doll, Madge Mitchell is Little Bo Peep, Jim Robinson is a Wizard, Shane and Mike are Tweedledum and Tweedledee, Jane is a Christmas Fairy, Dan Ramsay is a Clown, Helen Daniels is the Fairy godmother, Mrs Mangel (Vivian Grey) is Mary, Mary, Quite Contrary, Daphne and Des Clarke are Bride and Groom dolls, Susan Cole is Mary Christmas, her son Sam Cole (Thomas Hamston) is Happy Christmas, and Paul Robinson is the Baron. East said the cast "had a ball" filming the scenes, and Paine also had fond memories of making the episode, calling it "a wonderful, imaginative and creative time."

== Reception ==
The episode has received a mixed reaction from critics since it was broadcast. A TV Scene columnist wrote that it was "a show with a difference." They observed that the "yuletide spirit is well and truly missing from Ramsay St" at the beginning of the episode. But despite Clive making "a rapid and undignified exit" from the fight, there is a happy ending as he dreams of a White Christmas with the residents from the street. When the episode aired in the UK in 1988, an Evening Post reporter included it in their "Soap Box" feature, and noted that "It's Yuletide Down Under which heralds the revival of the old Robinson/Ramsay feud". They said that Clive "ends up seeing more of the action than he'd anticipated." Daniel Martin from The Guardian named Clive's dream sequence as one of the 10 most memorable soap Christmases. He stated that it was not the serial's best dream sequence, which went to Bouncer's Dream, but "this candy-coated reminder to the grim British contingent of how it should be done is burned onto the brains of twentysomethings nationwide." Martin called it "a bizarre festive dream sequence where the cast were re-imagined as pantomime characters."

MSN TV editor Lorna Cooper also branded Clive's dream "bizarre". A writer for TV Cream pointed out that episode featured the first Neighbours dream sequence, which later became a show tradition. They dubbed Clive's dream a "surreal Christmas fantasy". The Eastern Daily Press' Stacia Briggs also chose the episode as part of her "Memorable Christmas moments from the soaps" article. She wrote "From the sublime to the ridiculous, this was an example of Neighbours scriptwriters smashing down the fourth wall and presenting an episode that mimicked taking hallucinogenic drugs. Although not quite as mind-bending as Bouncer's Dream sequence (never bettered), Doctor Clive's festive dream came a close second." Briggs also joked that it was "like a Stilton dream." Michael Idato of The Sydney Morning Herald included the episode in his "10 strangest moments on Ramsay Street" feature. He thought the scriptwriters might have been "high" when they came up with the "absurd plot". While reviewing the show's season finales, TV Week commented "Clive was knocked out in a boxing match and dreamed that Ramsay Street had turned into a Christmas panto. Go figure."
