= Nick Page =

- Neighbours character
- Portrayed by: Mark Stevens
- Duration: 1988–1990
- First appearance: 22 July 1988
- Last appearance: 14 March 1990
- Introduced by: Don Battye
In-universe information
- Occupation: Erinsborough High Student; Artist

Nick Page is a fictional character from the Australian soap opera Neighbours, played by Mark Stevens. He made his first screen appearance during the episode broadcast on 22 July 1988. Stevens auditioned for the role alongside forty-one other actors and successfully made it through screen-tests. Nick is characterised as a tough orphan who is made homeless following the death of his grandmother. Nick is also portrayed as problematic and wayward, causing trouble for other characters in the show. Stevens has stated in different interviews that he self-identifies with Nick's tough persona. Writers created stories for Nick that eventually led to him becoming a "nicer" character.

His stories see him fostered by Helen Daniels (Anne Haddy) and moving in with her family. Writers also developed a relationship story with Sharon Davies (Jessica Muschamp), and the duo often cause trouble in the neighbourhood. Nick has aspirations of becoming an artist, which helps change his bad behaviour. Other stories include his friendship with Todd Landers (Kristian Schmid) and being diagnosed with meningitis. Stevens was later written out of the show and his exit story portrays Nick leaving to take an art scholarship in London, England. Nick last appeared in the episode broadcast on 14 March 1990.

== Casting ==
The character was brought in to fill the gap between younger characters Todd Landers (Kristian Schmid) and Katie Landers (Sally Jensen), and the established older teenagers who had recently left high school. Stevens joined the cast of Neighbours soon after taking part in Young Talent Time. He auditioned for the role along with forty one other actors and he made it onto a short-list of three. He told a reporter from My Guy that he was really nervous during the process. The actor was then required to complete one screen test and later secured the role. Stevens finished up on Young Talent Time during the week commencing 13 June 1988 and began filming his first scenes on Neighbours in the same month. He praised Young Talent Time for being a great training ground, saying "It'll be sad to leave. But Neighbours will be great. I'm very lucky to go straight from one into the other." Stevens was initially contracted until December 1989. His first scene consisted of Nick trying to find his stolen Walkman. Stevens told a reporter from Fast Forward that he was terrified prior to filming, adding "I stood outside with my knees knocking. I was so nervous I went to the toilet 60 times!"

== Development ==
Nick has a backstory that entails the role reversal of care between himself and his guardian. In The Neighbours Programme Guide, Monroe described how Nick's parents had died when he was eight years old and his grandmother assumed parental responsibility. She was poor but Nick never went without and he remained close and loving to her. But as she aged Nick was forced to care for her. He took a part-time job at a supermarket to fund their living and subsequently began to miss school. When she became too ill he stopped going to school, she was unable to discipline him and he "went off the rails". It was at this point he attracted the attention of residents of Ramsay Street.

Nick was billed as a "streetwise", young graffiti artist, and the show's newest "young heart-throb." David Brown of TV Week described him as "rebellious but with a strong sense of responsibility". Stevens called Nick "a rough T-shirt and jeans kid. He's also very loyal to his friends. He's a basic down-to-earth guy." Stevens also said Nick has been "through it all" following the deaths of his parents and moving into a caravan park with his grandmother. He thought he was a "gutsy" character.

Josephine Monroe, author of Neighbours: The First 10 Years described Nick as one Helen Daniels' (Anne Haddy) many waifs and strays, a budding artist and having a recalcitrant personality. Stevens told Jane Noone from TV Guide that "he has a sort of arrogance, he's got my streak of independence, which can never be bad!" Stevens told a My Guy writer that his character would develop into a nicer person during his tenure. He stated "he's far too arrogant and I've got a lot of respect for my elders – although Nick does turn into a bit of a nice guy later on."

Nick is caught spraying graffiti on Jim Robinson's (Alan Dale) workshop. In his book The who's who of soap operas, Anthony Hayward said that Nick becomes "homeless and lonely" following the death of his grandmother. Then Jim's mother, Helen invites Nick to move into the Robinson family home. A reporter from Neighbours Who's Who noted that Nick's life changes when he is "more or less adopted by Helen" who believes that he has real artistic talent. But other residents are initially suspicious of Nick and even accuse him of theft. He also gets into a number of fights during his tenure. Stevens told Kesta Desmond in the book Neighbours Special that "even when it's not his fault it seems as though he always gets himself into fights." In The Official Neighbours Annual 1990, Clive Hopwood branded Nick a "tearaway" who is always in trouble for graffitiing walls. Stevens told Hopwood that his "street wise graffiti artist" character is not a role model for Neighbours viewers. Stevens added that Nick is still a "rough boy and you have to earn his respect but he's settling down a bit". Nick's art work even begins to gain exposure when Harold Bishop (Ian Smith) agrees to hang some in his coffee shop.

Nick forms a friendship with Todd Landers (Schmid). In the Neighbours: The Official Annual 1991, authors John McCready and Nicola Furlong refer to the duo as a pair of "rascals" and "loveable rogues". Each time a window is smashed or there is trouble at Erinsborough High they get the blame. They writers noted that the two characters both have had "a rough time" in their pasts and being on Ramsay Street helps improve their lives. Stevens added that "Nick is a street kid and I find playing him very natural. 50 per cent of him is me".

Nick's first romance is with Sharon Davies (Jessica Muschamp). McCready and Furlong wrote "Sharon and Nick's relationship is a turbulent one. They play games with each other's emotions. At one point Sharon started to see Nick's arch enemy Skinner (Mat Stevenson). This caused a great deal of tension as Skinner is the bad sort. As usual they sorted out their differences." Sharon often "aided and abetted" Nick into getting into trouble. Sharon later ends their relationship. In another storyline Nick contracts meningitis. In December 1989, it was reported that Stevens had decided to leave the series to concentrate on his music career. Nick was written out of Neighbours in 1990 and he left to take an art scholarship in London.

== Storylines ==
Nick graffities Jim's fence at his workshop. When Henry Ramsay (Craig McLachlan) spots Nick, he runs off. Henry and Jim's nephew, Todd Landers set a trap to catch Nick, which catches him as he tries to respray the fence. Nick pleads with Jim not to phone the police for the sake of his grandmother. Jim's mother-in-law, Helen decides to give Nick a reprieve and suggests that he paint over his graffiti. Nick rejects Helen's offer of art classes and sees it as form of charity but eventually relents. When Nick accepts Helen's offer of a room at Number 26, Jim and Todd are resistant but eventually grow to accept Nick and support him after his grandmother dies.

Nick begins a romance with Sharon much to the chagrin of Sharon's aunt Edie Chubb (Irene Inescort). On the night of a school dance, Bruce Zadro (Myles Collins) hassles Sharon and Nick picks a fight with him but ends up with a black eye. Nick stands trial for a prior graffiti offence the following day and the magistrate spots his black eye. Helen and Sharon defend him and Nick is sentenced to 30 hours community service. When Sharon burns the Coffee Shop down after discarding a cigarette, Nick agrees to take the blame. Sharon later confesses to Harold that she was the culprit. Nick tries to stop Todd and Skinner from committing a raid on a warehouse, which results in Nick's arrest. Todd confesses that Skinner is the culprit and Nick is freed. Nick apprehends Skinner when he terrorises Todd and his sister Katie.

Nick faces more problems when Zadro reappears and frames him for spray-painting Principal Kenneth Muir's (Roger Boyce) car and the school, resulting in expulsion for Nick. After a plan by Sharon to extract a confession from Zadro succeeds, Muir reinstates Nick at Erinsborough High. Nick refuses to go back and drops out. When Hilary Robinson (Anne Scott-Pendlebury) bans Nick from seeing Sharon, the couple run away and begin work on a farm. When Sharon fights with the farmer's daughter, they are sacked and begin hitch-hiking back to Erinsborough. While hitching a lift, Nick comes face to face with Skinner, who pushes Nick out of the car and drives away with Sharon. After arriving home, Nick tries to warn Sharon about Skinner who she begins dating. After Skinner attempts to force himself on Sharon's older sister, Bronwyn Davies (Rachel Friend), Sharon realizes Nick is right. Nick and Sharon split up later and remain friends. Hilary's son, Matt Robinson (Ashley Paske) arrives from Adelaide and befriends Nick and Sharon.

Nick suffers a fall one afternoon and hits his head on the side of the pool at Number 30. Shortly after, He begins experiencing aggressive moods swings. When Jim confronts him about his behavior, he collapses and is diagnosed with meningitis caused by the skull fracture. Nick begins dating Lucy Robinson (Sasha Close), Jim's daughter who arrives home from boarding school for the holidays. Jim is unimpressed when he finds out that Nick and Lucy are at The Waterhole as they are underage. Nick and Lucy's relationship eventually fizzles out when she goes back to boarding school. Nick receives a chance to take up an art scholarship in London and is successful. Before leaving, he presents paintings to his closest friends Jim, Beverly, Helen and Sharon. Nick later sends Helen a postcard telling her he has fallen in love and his art comes second.

== Reception ==
The BBC described Nick's most notable moment as being "his first appearance when he was caught spraying graffiti." McCready and Furlong said that "the love lives of those such as Nick Page and Sharon Davies have made the programme perhaps the most popular viewing for teenagers around the world." The episode featuring Nick rescuing Todd and Katie from Skinner was watched by 21 million viewers in the United Kingdom. It was the most watched episode of any show during 1990. Laurence Akers from BIG! magazine said that every good soap opera has a rebel and Neighbours had Nick.

TV Guide's Noone branded Nick had a "knack for getting on everybody's wrong side." She added that Stevens had the "fresh faced good-looks" everyone had come to expect from a Neighbours casting and noted that he gained a large fan following from the show. A reporter from My Guy branded the character a "well-ard orphan". They later stated "If Nick Page had a birthday, we're sure it'd be between July 21 and August 23. Why? Well, because he's a bit of a tough nut, likes to show off and always speaks his mind - all typical Leo traits."
