= Friends for Twenty Years =

- Neighbours episode
- Episode no.: Season 21; Episode 4773
- Directed by: Jovita O'Shaughnessy
- Written by: Ben Marshall
- Original air date: 27 July 2005

Guest appearance
- 36: Kimberley Davies as Annalise Hartman; Mark Little as Joe Mangel; Joy Chambers as Rosemary Daniels; Andrew Bibby as Lance Wilkinson; Melissa Bell as Lucy Robinson; Ian Rawlings as Philip Martin; Terence Donovan as Doug Willis; Virginia Ryan as Kayla Thomas; Amielle Lemaire as Ashley Thomas; Tony Porter as Peter Reece; Lesley Baker as Angie Rebecchi; Rachel Blakely as Gaby Willis; Brett Blewitt as Brett Stark; Nicola Charles as Sarah Beaumont; David Clencie as Danny Ramsay; Fiona Corke as Gail Robinson; Lucinda Cowden as Melanie Pearson; Bernard Curry as Luke Handley; Delta Goodrem as Nina Tucker; Richard Grieve as Sam Kratz; Stephen Hunt as Matt Hancock; Annie Jones as Jane Harris; Todd MacDonald as Darren Stark; Benjamin McNair as Malcolm Kennedy; Shaunna O'Grady as Beverly Marshall; Moya O'Sullivan as Marlene Kratz; Anne Scott-Pendlebury as Hilary Robinson; Ailsa Piper as Ruth Wilkinson; Marnie Reece-Wilmore as Debbie Martin; Rebecca Ritters as Hannah Martin; Jansen Spencer as Paul McClain; Jesse Spencer as Billy Kennedy; Jacinta Stapleton as Amy Greenwood; Eliza Szonert as Danni Stark; Holly Valance as Felicity Scully; Kym Valentine as Libby Kennedy

Episode chronology
← Previous "Out with the Trash"	Next → "Left Holding the Baby"

"Friends for Twenty Years" is the 4773rd episode of the Australian television soap opera Neighbours. The episode was written by Ben Marshall, directed by Jovita O'Shaughnessy, and executively produced by Ric Pellizzeri. It first aired on 27 July 2005 on Network Ten in Australia, as part of the soap's 20th anniversary. Planning for the episode began in March 2004, twelve months before the anniversary. Producers decided to celebrate the 20th anniversary on-screen in July, as winter ratings are usually higher.

Many former Neighbours cast members were invited back for the episode. Producer Peter Dodds said the biggest challenge was getting the returning characters and the anniversary episodes to relate to what was going on in the show at the time, but he believed he had found a good way to combine both the past and the present. "Friends for Twenty Years" was shot in early 2005. Most of the returning actors filmed their scenes at the show's studios in Nunawading, while the others shot their appearance wherever they were based in the world.

The episode centres on Annalise Hartman's (Kimberley Davies) return to Erinsborough to screen her BBC documentary about Ramsay Street and its former residents, some of whom returned to town to view the documentary along with the current residents. More than 6 million viewers tuned in for the episode in the UK, while the critical response for the episode was mixed. Most critics bemoaned Annalise's new career as a film maker, while others were disappointed with the returning characters and thought the episode would only appeal to fans of the show.

== Plot ==
At the General Store, Boyd Hoyland (Kyal Marsh) and Sky Mangel (Stephanie McIntosh) discuss his new role as a father to Kayla Thomas's (Virginia Ryan) daughter. They are interrupted when Sky's father, Joe (Mark Little), suddenly arrives to see Sky. Joe explains that he had to come to town when he heard about Annalise Hartman's (Kimberley Davies) Ramsay Street documentary and he asks Sky all about Boyd and Kayla. Joe is also reunited with his former father-in-law, Harold Bishop (Ian Smith). At Karl Kennedy's (Alan Fletcher) flat, Toadfish Rebecchi (Ryan Moloney), Lance Wilkinson (Andrew Bibby), Annalise, Doug Willis (Terence Donovan) and Philip Martin (Ian Rawlings) gather to reminisce and film more scenes for Annalise's documentary. The following morning, all of the locals gather in Ramsay Street for a party and the screening of the documentary. Joe reminisces about his time on the street, while Max (Stephen Lovatt) and Stephanie Hoyland (Carla Bonner) learn that they are no longer allowed to adopt Kayla's daughter or any other child. At the hospital, where Paul Robinson (Stefan Dennis) is recovering from having his leg amputated, his sister, Lucy (Melissa Bell), visits and tries to encourage him to wear his false leg.

Paul and Lucy eventually turn up to Ramsay Street and Paul tells his aunt, Rosemary (Joy Chambers), that he is not selling his business to her. He then announces that he is staying in Erinsborough and is moving into Number 22 Ramsay Street. Annalise worries that the sun is too bright to show the documentary outside and insists on a change of venue. The group gather in the Scarlet Bar for the screening instead. Connor O'Neill (Patrick Harvey) turns up at the last minute and greets Toadie, which makes Lance jealous. Annalise thanks everyone for coming and for the use of their home videos, before explaining that the film is currently an untitled rough cut. The documentary begins with Annalise standing in Ramsay Street, talking about what it meant to her. It then cuts to various past residents, who talk about their time on the street. As the documentary ends, Harold stands up to announce that the documentary should be called Neighbours and the audience make a toast.

== Production ==
=== Development ===
Producer Peter Dodds joked that the production team first started thinking about the 20th anniversary after Neighbours had been on air for ten years. He said that due to the show's success, the team began to think in terms of decades and knew that they would have to have a big celebration in 2005. The actual planning for the anniversary episodes began twelve months before the anniversary. Line producer Linda Walker revealed that initial discussions began in March 2004. Although Neighbours celebrated its official 20th anniversary on 18 March 2005, the producers decided to broadcast the celebration in July that year when the winter viewing numbers are usually higher. Dodds stated that the crew had always anticipated an on-screen celebration, as well as off-screen celebrations with the cast and crew. He explained "With the celebration on camera, it was important to get past cast to come back, and we're very proud with how we've involved the actors from years ago. It's a very affectionate couple of episodes." The storyline saw Annalise Hartman (played by Kimberley Davies) return to Erinsborough to screen her BBC documentary about Ramsay Street and its former residents.

Dodds told Michael Gadd from The Newcastle Herald that the anniversary week would be "a case of fans playing 'spot the cameo'" as popular actors returned to the show. He also called it "a great challenge" getting the returning characters and the episodes to relate to what was going on in the show at the time. The producer said "But I think we've found a great way to combine the past and the present." Dodds later commented that it was not difficult for the script writing team to come up with scenarios that allowed the actors and characters to come back to the show. He explained that when a character leaves they go into "a state of suspended animation" and they are often referred to, making it easier to bring them back. Actor Alan Fletcher, who plays Karl Kennedy, described the anniversary episodes as being "a reminiscence that doesn't interfere with plot." He said the episodes would celebrate the show's past, without dominating the present, and added that the scripts were "nicely crafted", believing viewers would like them.

=== Casting ===
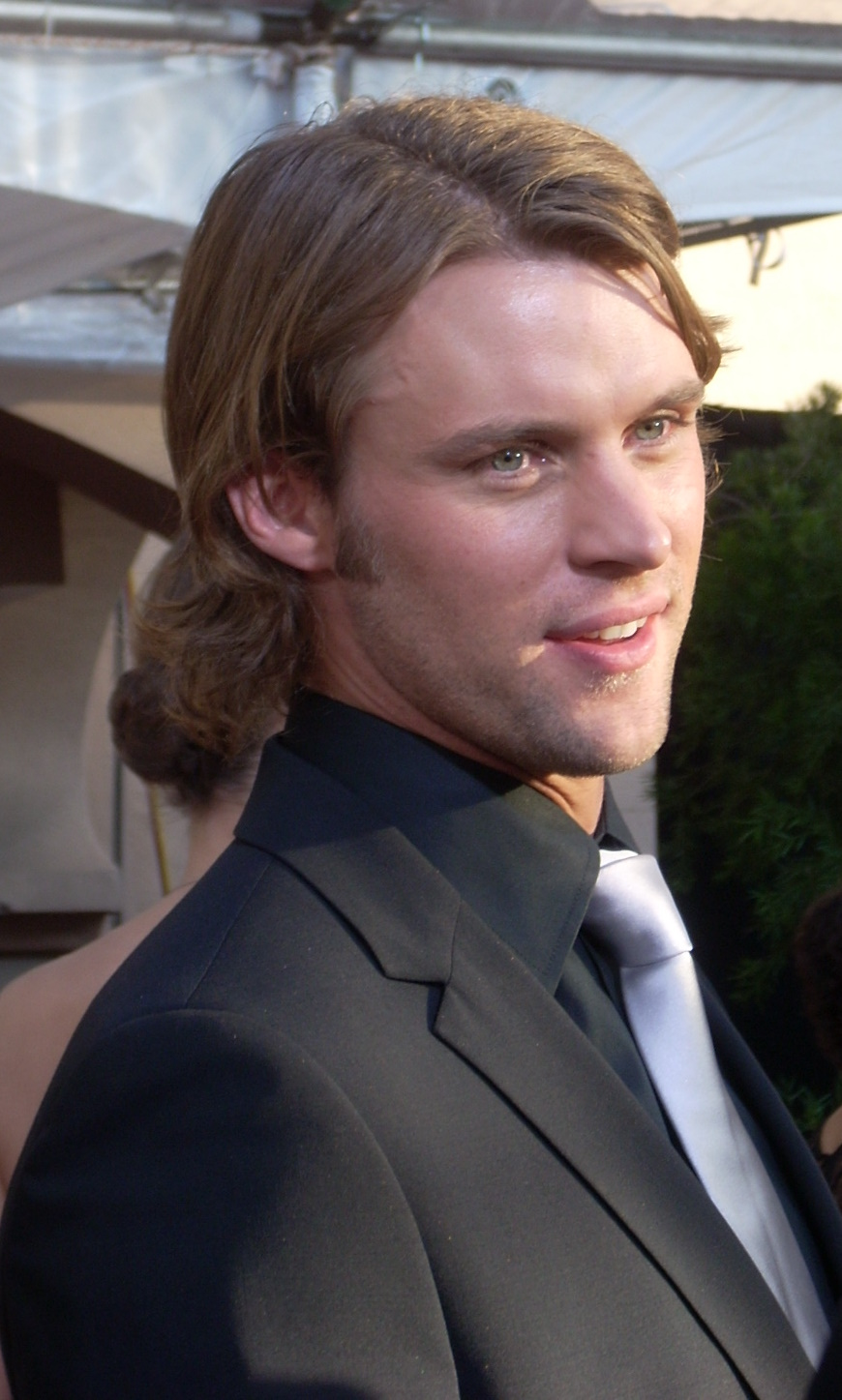
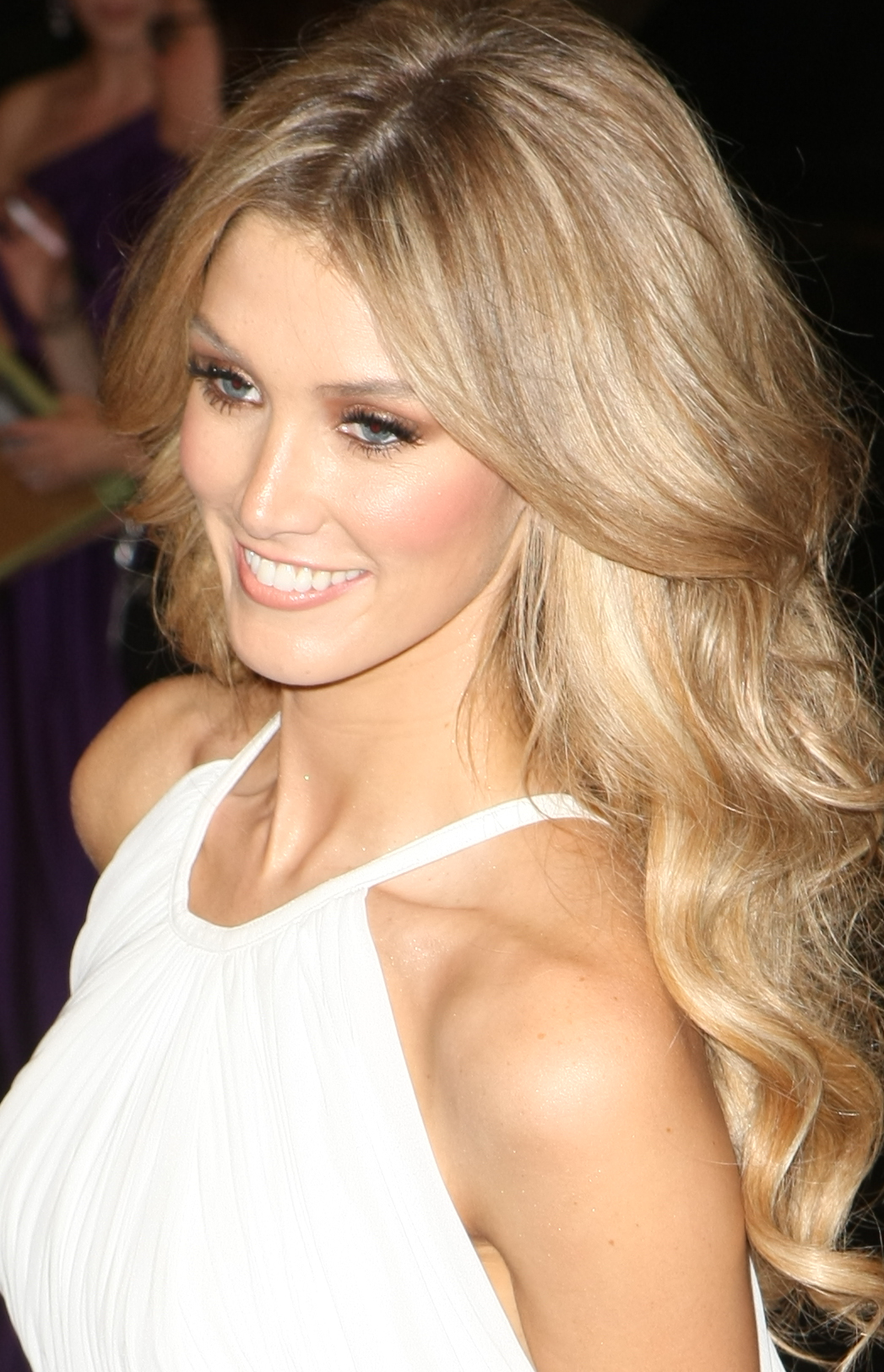
Former Neighbours cast members Jesse Spencer (left) and Delta Goodrem (right) filmed cameos for the episode.

Walker explained that each actor was approached to appear in the episode and some of them were difficult to track down. Walker thought Nicola Charles (Sarah Beaumont) was the hardest cast member to find as she had stopped working in the acting industry. Walker said "We found out one of the shows she last worked on was on the BBC, so we asked colleagues in London to ask the BBC to ask Nicola if she would get in touch! There was lots of detective work, and late night phones calls, and tracking down actors by friends of friends of friends." Charles's return was announced in January 2005, along with Davies's. Charles said she was "thrilled" to be asked to return for the anniversary, but she was equally "horrified" because she had recently given birth to her daughter and felt she was overweight.

Davies agreed to fly to Australia from Hollywood to reprise her role as Annalise. The actress admitted that she was surprised when she received the call asking her to return, but thought the idea of Annalise filming a documentary about Ramsay Street was clever. She took a week to think about the offer, having just given birth to her son, but after reflecting on her time with the show, she agreed to come back. On 9 March 2005, it was announced actress and singer Delta Goodrem (Nina Tucker) had filmed her return scenes. Days later Annie Jones (Jane Harris), Jesse Spencer (Billy Kennedy), Holly Valance (Felicity Scully) and original cast member David Clencie (Danny Ramsay) were confirmed to appear. The following month, Kylie Miller from The Age reported that Terence Donovan (Doug Willis), Kym Valentine (Libby Kennedy), Mark Little (Joe Mangel) and Melissa Bell (Lucy Robinson) would film their returns that month.

A complete list of returning actors and details of their appearances was released shortly afterwards. The list comprised; Rachel Blakely (Gaby Willis), Eliza Szonert (Danni Stark), Benjamin McNair (Malcolm Kennedy), Moya O'Sullivan (Marlene Kratz), Ian Rawlings (Philip Martin), Stephen Hunt (Matt Hancock), Jacinta Stapleton (Amy Greenwood), Richard Grieve (Sam Kratz), Rebecca Ritters (Hannah Martin), Marnie Reece-Wilmore (Debbie Martin), Fiona Corke (Gail Robinson), Bernard Curry (Luke Handley), Jansen Spencer (Paul McClain), Lesley Baker (Angie Rebecchi), Anne Scott-Pendlebury (Hilary Robinson), Shaunna O'Grady (Beverly Marshall), Ailsa Piper (Ruth Wilkinson), Brett Blewitt (Brett Stark), Todd MacDonald (Darren Stark), Lucinda Cowden (Melanie Pearson), Andrew Bibby (Lance Wilkinson) and Joy Chambers (Rosemary Daniels).

Not all the actors asked agreed to return. Natalie Imbruglia (Beth Brennan), Guy Pearce (Mike Young), Radha Mitchell (Catherine O'Brien), Jason Donovan (Scott Robinson) and Kylie Minogue (Charlene Mitchell) were some of the notable actors who did not or turned down invitations to appear. Minogue stated that she was willing to film a cameo appearance as Charlene while she was on tour in the UK, but the producers turned down her offer. However, the production company Grundy Television issued a statement in which they claimed that the producers approached Minogue's management company in November 2004 and offered to shoot the cameo appearance anywhere in the world, but their offer was rejected. Although British newspapers reported that Russell Crowe had agreed to reprise his role of Kenny Larkin, his representative later confirmed that the reports were not true. Despite his character, Jim Robinson, being killed off in 1993, Alan Dale was asked to return for the anniversary. He declined, having previously stated that he was badly treated during his time on the show.

=== Filming ===
"Friends for Twenty Years" was shot in early 2005. The episode was scripted in a way that allowed cameos to be shot over a number of months and account for any actors who accepted the invitation to appear at the last minute. Many of the former actors returned to the Neighbours studios in Nunawading to film their scenes, while others were shot wherever they were based in the world. A show spokesperson admitted that many of the cameos were filmed in the UK. Not wanting to be away from newborn daughter, Charles was happy when the producers suggested that she film her scenes in her back garden. Charles explained, "A lot of us have moved to London so it made sense to film it here. It was very exciting and it was great to be part of such good show again. It made me very nostalgic." Spencer could not return to Australia to shoot his cameo because of filming commitments in Los Angeles. Instead, he asked a friend to film him on Malibu Beach, pretending his character was on holiday, and sent it to the producers. Hunt shot his scenes in a Grundy Television office in Sydney. He revealed that he had not learnt his lines well, which was embarrassing for him as Pellizzeri was the director for that shoot. Valentine also filmed her scenes in the city.

== Reception ==
More than 6 million viewers tuned in for the episode in the UK. The lunchtime showing attracted 3.15 million viewers, giving the show a 44.1% audience share. The evening showing managed a small increase to 3.48 million and a 23.2% audience share.

"So. You think you're getting a contemporary episode starring Harold and Paul and a bunch of nine-year-olds – when suddenly a load of characters from yesteryear show up, thanks to an improbable storyline in which glamorous former resident Annalise, now a famous film-maker, returns to screen her documentary about Ramsay Street."

— Charlie Brooker, The Guardian, 15 October 2005

Reviews for the episode were mixed. Graeme Whitfield, writing for the Western Mail, was disappointed with the reunion and the returning characters. He quipped "Neighbours celebrated its anniversary earlier this year by bringing back all the star names from its illustrious past. Except it didn't. It brought back Lance and Phil Martin, who, let's face it, were always rubbish. Of course, I didn't expect Kylie, Guy Pearce or Natalie Imbruglia to go back to Ramsay Street now that they are big stars. [...] But surely they could have found Clive (Geoff Paine) or Henry (Craig McLachlan), who have done pretty much nothing since they left Erinsborough in the late 1980s?" Whitfield thought the episode had started well with the return of Joe Mangel and Harold's reaction to his reappearance, but soon realised that the episode would "end in disappointment."

The Daily Mirror's Jane Simon wrote that Joe's greeting to his daughter – "G'day, chook, how's yer bum for grubs?" – was for "the benefit of any viewers who were afraid Neighbours might be getting classy in its old age." Simon thought it was odd that the returning characters only remembered the good things about Erinsborough, saying "There's almost no mention of the adultery, shootings, murders, plane crashes, car crashes, fires, comas and explosions that have been Ramsay Street's bread and butter." Sue Heath from The Northern Echo shared a similar opinion to Simon. She also commented that the episode was unusual, but it provided an excuse for "a trip down memory lane." Heath thought Annalise was "the last person you'd imagine would become a documentary film-maker" and criticised her film-making style. The Guardian's Charlie Brooker thought the returning actors turned the episode into "a heartbreaking visual meditation on the ageing process." He also called the episode "a bizarre clipshow", which left him feeling blank by the end. He added that it was "classic Neighbours though."

Doug Anderson from The Sydney Morning Herald was not a fan of the nostalgic feel to the episode, saying "Kimberley Davies returns to the infamous cul de sac in the guise of a doco filmmaker to present a series of choice cuts from the past - the personification of white bread Australia, sliced thick. The nostalgia is even thicker and ickier than the wall-to-wall effusion that propels Nine's series of opportunistic programs dredged from the Bert Newton vaults. A must for viewers with cast-iron stomachs". Anderson's colleague Judy Adamson had a similar view. Of Annalise's documentary, she commented "In the show's eyes she is now a respected filmmaker, but her "documentary" is nothing more than grabs with former locals chatting about what they're doing now, how Ramsay Street changed their lives and then blowing kisses to those who still live there. Nothing could be more vomit-inducing for the uncommitted viewer."
