= Robinson family =

Fictional family from the Australian soap opera Neighbours

- Neighbours family
- First appearance: 18 March 1985
- Created by: Reg Watson
- Introduced by: Reg Watson (1985); Ric Pellizzeri (2004)
- Duration: 1985–1999, 2004–
- Spin-offs: Neighbours: The Robinsons – A Family in Crisis (1989)
Family members
- Sam Robinson; James Robinson; Bess Robinson; Hilary Robinson; Jim Robinson; Glen Donnelly; Julie Martin; Lucy Robinson; Matt Robinson; Paul Robinson; Scott Robinson; Kiri Durant; Hannah Martin; Andrew Robinson; Annie Robinson-Pappas; Cameron Robinson; Daniel Robinson; Elle Robinson; Madison Robinson; Robert Robinson; David Tanaka; Leo Tanaka; Amy Williams; Harlow Robinson; Abigail Tanaka; Isla Tanaka-Brennan; Jimmy Williams

The Robinson family are a fictional family from the Australian television soap opera Neighbours. The family were created by Reg Watson and introduced in the first episode of the serial, broadcast on 18 March 1985. The family initially consisted of Jim Robinson (Alan Dale), his mother-in-law Helen Daniels (Anne Haddy), and his four children Paul Robinson (Stefan Dennis), Julie Martin (Vikki Blanche), Scott Robinson (Darius Perkins; Jason Donovan), and Lucy Robinson (Kylie Flinker; Sasha Close; Melissa Bell). The Robinsons have one of the largest and most complex family trees in the show's history.

== Creation ==
The Robinson family was one of three central families introduced to viewers when Neighbours began in 1985, created by the show's creator and executive producer Reg Watson. Watson said the idea for Neighbours began with the Robinsons – a widower and four children. He wanted a mother-in-law to live with them, and decided that she would be supportive instead of interfering, as television viewers had come to expect. Of how the Robinson family came to be created, Watson said "I thought how interesting it would be to have a family where the children could ask their parents anything and get an honest answer."

== Development ==
The Robinsons are made up of several different family groups that have married together. These are the original Robinsons, the Daniels, the Martins, the Dennisons, the Simpsons and the Duncans. The Robinsons live in the fictitious Melbourne suburb of Erinsborough and have roots leading back to the 1800s in that area. The family have always lived in Ramsay Street, the land once owned by former Mayor "Black" Jack Ramsay.

=== Homes ===
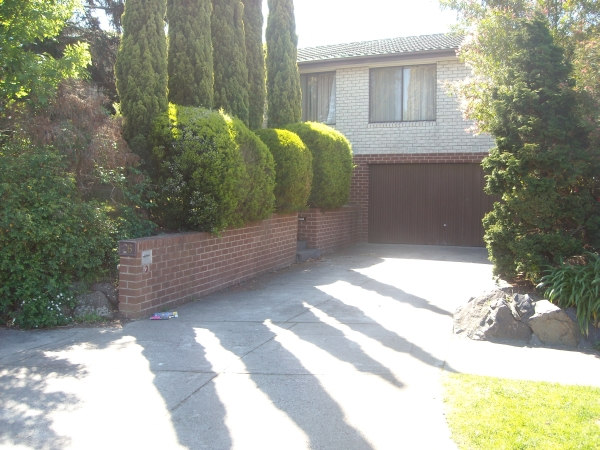
No. 26 Ramsay Street was home to the Robinson family from 1985 to 1993.

==== 26 Ramsay Street ====
Number 26 was the home of the Robinson family from the show's beginning until Jim Robinson's death in 1993. The house was then owned by Jim's mother-in-law, Helen Daniels, who lived with various family members and lodgers, until her on-screen death in 1997. Following the departure of Helen's former son-in-law Philip Martin and his family in late 1999, Number 26 is home to the Scully family. In 2013, Jim's son Paul buys the house from Lyn Scully (Janet Andrewartha). He rents it to Sheila Canning (Colette Mann) until late 2015 when she buys it from him.

==== 22 Ramsay Street ====
Bought by Paul on behalf of the Daniels Corporation in 1986, it becomes the second family home after he marries Gail Lewis in June 1987. Paul rents the house to Caroline and Christina Alessi, before moving back in when he marries Christina. Following their departures, Paul rents the house to Christina's uncle and aunt, who live there with their sons. It was briefly rented to the Lim family, before Paul sells it to Cheryl Stark (Caroline Gillmer). In 2005, following the character's return to Erinsbourough, he buys the house from Valda Sheergold and lives there until 2013. The set then underwent a makeover in time for the reintroduction of the Willis family, who move in when Terese Willis' (Rebekah Elmaloglou) Lassiters employment deal includes the house as accommodation. Paul moves back into the house to live with Terese in 2019.

==== 30 Ramsay Street ====
Paul and his new wife Terry Inglis (Maxine Klibingaitis) occupied Number 30 in late 1985. Paul moves back to Number 26 after Terry shoots him in the living room. Matt and his mother Hilary live in the house between 1989 and 1990.

Members of the Robinson family have lived in every house in the street at one point or another. Matt Robinson (Ashley Paske) alone lived in Number 26, Number 28, Number 30 and Number 32 during his years in the show.

=== Departure and reintroduction ===
Stefan Dennis departed the series in 1992 and moved to the UK. His character, Paul Robinson, moved to the United States, a rather open-ended departure. Dennis returned in 1993 for the 2000th episode celebrations and to close the book on the character. In the week he appeared in the show, Paul set up Philip Martin, his brother-in-law, to make it look like he was defrauding Lassiters, the hotel Paul owns. After the police began investigating, Paul's conscience got the better of him. He wrote a letter that cleared Phil of all wrongdoing and escaped the country after saying goodbye to Helen. This was intended to be the character's final appearance and to this day many fans regard it as being completely out of character for Paul. In the finale of the 2004 season, Paul returned to the area and re-established the Robinson family in Neighbours.

=== Lineage expansion ===
==== 2000s ====
Following Dennis' return to the serial in 2004, the Robinson lineage was greatly expanded on. On 19 September 2005, Paul's daughter, Elle Robinson (Pippa Black), was introduced as one of three of Paul and Gail Robinson's (Fiona Corke) children, who were all born off-screen in 1989. During the pregnancy and following Paul and Gail's divorce, she moves to Tasmania, where she raises Elle, Robert Robinson (Adam Hunter) and Cameron Robinson (also Hunter). Elle's brothers were both introduced on 28 March 2006. Robert and Cameron's storyline sees Cameron killed in the crossfire of Robert's attempt to kill his father, who he had grown "withdrawn and isolated – and deeply resentful" of for leaving him and his siblings during their youth. Upon arriving in Erinsborough, Robert commits identity fraud by pretending to be Cameron, which eventually leads to Cameron's death, as he is "bumped off" by Max Hoyland (Stephen Lovatt). After killing three members of Neighbours' Bishop family and attempting to kill Paul twice, Robert is sent to prison. Pippa Black decided to bow out of the serial in 2009. Two years later, Neighbours producers approached Jordan Patrick Smith to play the role of Paul's other son, Andrew Robinson, who was born on-screen in 1991. Smith agreed and joined the serial's regular cast on a two-year contract, which was renewed once it expired.

In February 2009, Kate Ramsay (Ashleigh Brewer), Harry Ramsay (Will Moore) and Sophie Ramsay (Kaiya Jones) were introduced as a new generation of the Ramsay family. It then emerged on-screen that Anne Robinson had an affair with married man Max Ramsay (Francis Bell), and they had an illegitimate child named Jill Ramsay (Perri Cummings). Kate, Harry and Sophie's mother. Jill's existence was kept quiet due to the feud between the Robinsons and Ramsays. Although Jill soon dies from a hit and run, the new Ramsay characters gave Paul additional family for him to appear alongside. When asked about his connection to the Robinson and Ramsay families, Moore explained, "At first I thought 'Oh my God, am I supposed to do something special?' Everyone said 'Your character's Harry Ramsay? Like Ramsay Street?' So I have those connections, but I got used to playing it after a while. It's pretty cool to be playing a part that has so much history and it's cool that we're related to so many of the original characters – Anne Robinson and Max Ramsay had an affair and had our mum."

==== 2010s ====
2014 saw the introduction of powercouple Scott and Charlene Robinson's (Kylie Minogue) son, Daniel Robinson (Tim Phillipps). The character was created in 1992, but first appeared in 2014. Dennis, who played the only remaining Robinson character in the show at the time, supervised and assisted producers with auditions. Phillips planned on staying a part of the cast until at least 2017, but producers decided to write his character out with his newly wedded wife, Imogen Willis (Ariel Kaplan), but not before Sarah Ellen made her debut as Daniel's sister, Madison, a character first referenced in 1995.

In 2015, a storyline saw Paul falsely diagnosed with cancer, which pushes him to find his estranged daughter, Amy Williams, who was previously played by Nicolette Minster and Sheridan Compagnino in 1988 and 1992 respectively. It was announced in May 2015 that Zoe Cramond had passed auditions and would be playing Amy on a regular basis. Daniel Kilkelly of Digital Spy also revealed that Amy would be bringing her son, Jimmy Williams (Darcy Tadich), to Erinsborough, giving Paul his first grandchild. Of the family expansion, Dennis joked, "What, I'm grandfather? How did that happen? I guess if you stick around long enough, that's the next step, although the one consolation - Alan Fletcher was a grandpa before me." Around this time, Melissa Bell reprised her role as Lucy Robinson in a storyline that sees her and Chris Pappas (James Mason) agree to have a daughter, who they name Annie Robinson-Pappas (Gracie Helen Vine).

Amy begins helping twins David (Takaya Honda) and Leo Tanaka (Tim Kano) find their father and develops a romantic relationship with Leo. Amy and Leo break up and reunite a number of times before finally agreeing to a real relationship in 2017. Kim Tanaka (Jenny Young) eventually reveals to Paul that Leo and David are his kids due to a pregnancy in 1985 caused by Paul and Kim having sex in the Erins Burrow Motel. The news reaches Amy and Leo before they have sex. The moment was named "awkward… horrible… mortifying." Dennis, Cramond, Kano, Honda and Young were all aware of the outcome for the storyline when it began. Of his role, Kano stated a few years later that acting as Leo "doesn't feel like work at all."

Paul discovers that he has a granddaughter named Harlow Robinson (Jemma Donovan) when he and David visit Robert in prison. Harlow explains to her family that Robert and her mother met in Tasmania, but Harlow was raised in London. Donovan explained, "I am so happy and very honoured to be a part of a series which has been enjoyed by generations." Donovan's real life father played Harlow's great uncle, Scott, whilst her grandfather Terence played Doug Willis, and her aunt, Stephanie Mcintosh played Sky Mangel. Jemma Donovan's connection to the Robinson family was named "an unexpected surprise."

==== 2020s ====
David and his husband, Aaron Brennan (Matt Wilson), begin researching surrogacy in 2020 in order for them to have a child. They decide to get an egg donor from Canada, but newcomer Nicolette Stone (Charlotte Chimes) offers to be the egg donor and surrogate mother after careful consideration. Chimes described that Nicolette planned on being a "fun aunty" in the child's life. To the disappointment of Paul, as he and Nicolette do not get along well, David and Aaron begin the surrogacy process and Nicolette falls pregnant in 2021. This paves the way for Kano's reprisal as Leo, who departed the soap two years prior. Leo becomes suspicious of Nicolette's attachment to the child, so he buys a local business as a reason to stay in Erinsborough. Kano stated, "He finds a reason to stick around in Erinsborough, so that he can keep an eye on things. However, then as the storyline goes on, you start to see that Leo has a few skeletons in his closet that will come into play as well." Additionally, he commented, "That's why I was really drawn to this storyline, and to coming back to Neighbours."

Nicolette begins seeing the child as her own, experiences issues with David, Aaron and her own partner, which forces her to flee Erinsborough pregnant with Britney Barnes (Montana Cox), who is also pregnant. Paul tracks Nicolette down in Erinsborough and pays her to give up David's daughter, Isla Tanaka-Brennan (Axelle Austin; Mary Finn), but Nicolette instead gives up Britney's daughter, Abigail (Mary Finn; Axelle Austin; Juliet Basaraba). It turns out that Abigail is actually Britney and Leo's daughter, who was concepted when Britney and Leo were dating in New York. Honda explained, "This story was plotted a long time ago. Back in December 2019, I knew about this storyline – although it actually wasn't with Nicolette. I won't go into who it originally was, but it originally wasn't her. I'd been told that this would be my big storyline for this year, but it ended fairly differently. The idea of a surrogate coming in and then ultimately running off, taking the baby with them, was something I knew about quite a long time ago." David, Aaron and Nicolette eventually agree to a three-way custody split, whilst Leo grapples with fatherhood after Britney is killed.

In 2022, Kiri Durant (Gemma Bird Matheson) was introduced as the daughter of Glen Donnelly (Richard Huggett). Kiri is unaware that she is related to Glen, believing that her mother, Barbara Durant (Wendy Mocke), and her stepfather, Alan Durant, are her true parents.

=== Incest ===
In 1991, Lucy Robinson returned to Ramsay Street. In the time she had been away, Jim's illegitimate son Glen Donnelly had showed up and revealed his existence to Jim. After living together for months, the attraction between Lucy and Glen resulted in a kiss. Though their relationship was short and mostly implied, the BBC cut the plot and edited the episodes around it. However, UKTV Gold re-aired these episode in 1998 with the plot remaining intact.

A second near-incest storyline was featured in 2007, when Elle Robinson fell in love with Oliver Barnes (David Hoflin), and they had sex, shortly before Oliver was informed by his mother that Paul was really his father. Had this been true, this would have been the furthest an incest storyline had gone in the show's history. However, the claim was disproved by a DNA test soon after.

A third incest storyline aired in 2017, featuring the romantic relationship Amy and Leo. Paul manages to stop them from consummating their relationship in time.

=== Character assassination ===
When Stefan Dennis returned to the show in 2004, most of his storylines stemmed from the fraud storyline and displayed him as a morally corrupt, hate-filled villain. Since his return, Paul has murdered Gus Cleary (Ben Barrack), set fire to and destroyed the Lassiters complex, attempted to sell Ramsay Street to American developers to turn it into a shopping centre, been a homewrecker to the Bishop family and eventually lost his leg in a fall. A possible explanation has been offered for this behaviour: a brain tumour, which Elle believes may be responsible for everything bad he has ever done. After the tumour was removed, Paul lost 20 years worth of his memory.

Although he attempted to redeem himself, Paul was shown to have a repetitive streak of meddling in his children's relationships. In 2017, Kim Tanaka revealed to him that he had two more children with her. He has since had a somewhat tumultuous relationship with David and Leo, meddling in their respective relationships, as well as those of his Amy's. Paul's ill-intentions had resulted in the tragic death of his son, David, following a fight between Eden and Leo. He has also been variously criticised by his family members for his dodgy dealings with Mannix Foster (Sam Webb) and others including Victor Cleary (Richard Sutherland), the brother of Gus, and the role it played in his niece Kate Ramsay's (Ashleigh Brewer) death. These actions have accumulated for the character countless enemies including Mark Brennan (Scott McGregor), Chloe Brennan (April Rose Pengilly), Gary Canning (Damien Richardson), Pierce Greyson (Tim Robards), Hendrix Greyson (Ben Turland) and Nicolette Stone (Charlotte Chimes).

== Family members ==
- Unknown
  - Sam Robinson, married Margaret "Mary" Gillard
    - James Robinson; son of Sam; married Bess Robinson
      - Jim Robinson; son of James and Bess; married Anne Daniels and Beverly Marshall
        - Paul Robinson; son of Jim and Anne; married Terry Inglis, Gail Lewis, Christina Alessi, Lyn Scully, Rebecca Napier and Terese Willis
          - Amy Williams; daughter of Paul and Nina Williams; married Liam Barnett
            - Jimmy Williams; son of Amy and Liam
          - Leo Tanaka; son of Paul and Kim
            - Abigail Tanaka; daughter of Leo and Britney Barnes
          - David Tanaka; son of Paul and Kim Tanaka; married Aaron Brennan
            - Isla Tanaka-Brennan; daughter of David, Aaron and Nicolette Stone
          - Robert Robinson; son of Paul and Gail
            - Harlow Robinson; daughter of Robert and Prue Wallace
          - Cameron Robinson; son of Paul and Gail
          - Elle Robinson; daughter of Paul and Gail
          - Andrew Robinson; son of Paul and Christina
        - Julie Martin; daughter of Anne and Roger Bannon; adopted by Jim; married Philip Martin
          - Hannah Martin; daughter of Julie and Philip
        - Scott Robinson; son of Jim and Anne; married Charlene Mitchell
          - Daniel Robinson; son of Scott and Charlene; married Imogen Willis
          - Madison Robinson; daughter of Scott and Charlene
        - Glen Donnelly; son of Jim and Maureen Donnelly; married Karen Constantine
          - Kiri Durant; daughter of Glen and Barbara Durant
        - Lucy Robinson; daughter of Jim and Anne; married David Kazalaian and Mark Gottlieb
          - Annie Robinson-Pappas; daughter of Lucy and Chris Pappas
    - Unnamed Robinson
      - Hilary Robinson
        - Matt Robinson; son of Hilary and Barry Dwyer, adopted by Margaret Williams
  - Agnes Robinson, married Richard Adair
    - Roger Adair; son Agnes and Fred Ramsay, married an unknown woman
      - Unnamed Adair, married an unknown woman
        - Agnes Adair, granddaughter of Roger, married to William (deceased)
          - Jacqueline, daughter of Agnes and William

Jim's mother-in-law, Helen Daniels, is also considered a member of the family.

== Reception ==
In her 1994 book The Neighbours Programme Guide, Josephine Monroe wrote "In the nine years that Neighbours has been going, each member of this remarkable family has endured enough trauma to put most people into an early grave! It seems these Robinson folk have invincibility running through their veins." In 2003, Inside Soap ran a poll asking which soap families were the most loved and loathed of all time. The Robinson's came third with 16% of the vote to find the most loved family of the 1980s, behind the Watts from EastEnders and the Ewings from Dallas. They were also voted the third most loathed family of that decade, receiving 11% of the vote. Roz Golds from The Birmingham Post called the Robinson family "the original heart of the show." Joe Julians of the Radio Times said the Robinsons "take no prisoners" and described the 2020 incarnation of the family as "ruthless, but strong and independent with a taste for romance, even if it doesn't always work out."
