= Katie Landers =

Fictional character

- Neighbours character
- Portrayed by: Sally Jensen
- Duration: 1988–1989
- First appearance: 15 February 1988
- Last appearance: 6 September 1989
- Introduced by: Reg Watson
In-universe information
- Occupation: Student
- Father: Bob Landers
- Mother: Annette Landers
- Brothers: Todd Landers
- Grandfathers: Rhys Marshall
- Aunts: Beverly Marshall
- Nieces: Hope Gottlieb

Katie Landers is a fictional character from the Australian soap opera Neighbours, played by Sally Jensen. She made her first on screen appearance on 15 February 1988. Katie is the niece of Beverly Marshall and sister to Todd Landers. During her time in the show, she became close friends with Toby Mangel. Katie departed on 6 September 1989.

== Casting ==
Jensen and Kristian Schmid (who played Todd Landers) had not met before or had any acting experience until they attended a drama class with the Actor's Training Studio in Melbourne. Scouts from the Grundy Organisation were also in attendance, on the look out for a pair of actors for Neighbours. Jensen and Schmid attended an audition for the roles of regular characters, Katie and Todd, and following a screen test, they were cast. Both actors were at school when they were cast, so they were given an on set tutor and a schoolroom was built behind the studio.

== Development ==
Katie and her brother Todd are the children of Adelaide couple Annette (Tania Uren) and Bob Landers (Robin Harrison/Bruce Kilpatrick). They come to Ramsay Street to live with their aunt, Beverly (Lisa Armytage/Shaunna O'Grady), after their parents go through a difficult time in their marriage. Katie developed a close friendship with Toby Mangel (Finn Greentree-Keane) and the BBC said that they "set about causing all sorts of mischief." Katie also grew close to Helen Daniels (Anne Haddy) and when she learnt that her father was attempting to blackmail her, Katie did not really forgive him. Katie began missing her mother and eventually returned to Adelaide, while Todd stayed behind.

== Storylines ==
Katie and her older brother Todd arrive in Ramsay Street with family friend Hilary Robinson (Anne Scott-Pendlebury), for their aunt Beverly's wedding to Hilary's cousin, Jim (Alan Dale). After the service, Katie and Todd run away but are eventually found by Scott (Jason Donovan) and Charlene Robinson (Kylie Minogue). After settling into the family, Katie begins to view Helen Daniels, Jim's mother-in-law as a surrogate grandmother and begins calling her Gran.

Katie later makes friends with Toby Mangel, who has recently moved in with his father Joe (Mark Little) and cousin Jane Harris (Annie Jones) and the two become close friends. One day, Toby eats garlic before he has to kiss Katie in a school play and receives a black eye for his trouble. They reconcile at Christmas when Katie gives Toby a kiss at the Robinsons' Christmas party, much to his embarrassment.

When Helen is blackmailed for large sums of money (up to and including $20,000) and has threats made against her family, Katie and Toby play detective and discover the blackmailer is Katie and Todd's father, Bob. Bob is arrested but Jim agrees to put up bail for the sake of Todd and Katie. Todd is willing to give his dad another chance but Katie is not, causing a rift between them. Bob plots with Todd to leave Erinsborough but Katie alerts Jim and Beverly in the nick of time and Bob is arrested and imprisoned.

After getting a new pet rabbit, Rupert, Katie is thrilled. Rupert disappears one day and Katie cannot find him. After having dinner at the Mangels, Katie is alarmed to discover Joe has made rabbit stew and immediately assumes he cooked Rupert. After a funeral which involves the stew believed to be Rupert being buried in a casserole dish, Henry Ramsay (Craig McLachlan) finds Rupert in his garden.

At the end of the year, Katie's mother Annette feels ready to have Todd and Katie back in Adelaide with her. The kids are torn between wanting to stay in Erinsborough and going back home with their mother. Katie decides to go back, but Todd having settled in Erinsborough, made friends and recently began dating Melissa Jarrett (Jade Amenta) decides to stay put. Katie is angry with Todd but he assures her he will always visit her and Annette. On the day of Katie's departure, she gives Rupert to Toby to look after. Toby and Katie share an emotional goodbye and Toby kisses Katie, much to her delight before leaving.

== Reception ==
The BBC said Katie's most notable moment was "Forcing Joe Mangel to bury a casserole." The Sun-Herald said Katie and Todd's escapades often portrayed storylines which were "vital themes in the show."
