= Beverly Marshall =

Fictional characters from Neighbours

- Neighbours character
- Shaunna O'Grady as Beverly Marshall (2019)
- Portrayed by: Lisa Armytage (1987–1989); Shaunna O'Grady (1989–2025)
- Duration: 1987–1990, 2005, 2019–2020, 2025
- First appearance: 6 July 1987
- Last appearance: 11 August 2025
- Introduced by: Reg Watson (1987); Ric Pellizerri (2005); Jason Herbison (2019)
In-universe information
- Other names: Beverly Robinson
- Occupation: Doctor
- Father: Rhys Marshall
- Sisters: Annette Landers
- Husband: Jim Robinson (1988–1991)
- Stepsons: Paul Robinson; Scott Robinson; Glen Donnelly
- Stepdaughters: Lucy Robinson; Julie Martin
- Nephews: Todd Landers
- Nieces: Katie Landers

Beverly Marshall (also Robinson) is a fictional character from the Australian soap opera Neighbours. Upon her introduction on 6 July 1987, the character was played by Lisa Armytage. Following Armytage's decision to quit the role in 1988, producers chose to recast the role to Shaunna O'Grady. O'Grady relocated from Sydney to Melbourne for filming and her first scenes as Beverly aired on 16 March 1989.

Beverly took on the role of the serial's local GP, and became a love interest for established regular Jim Robinson (Alan Dale). After a bad start, Beverly and Jim realise that they have many shared interests and they eventually marry. However, their marriage falls apart due to Beverly's desire to have a child of her own. Producers decided not to renew O'Grady's contract and Beverly departed on 5 September 1990.

O'Grady reprised the role in 2005, along with several former cast members for a cameo appearance in the serial's 20th anniversary episode "Friends for Twenty Years". She reprised the role again on 19 March 2019, as Beverly is brought back to Erinsborough by her former stepson Paul Robinson (Stefan Dennis). The character has since made sporadic appearances to treat patients, and had a brief relationship with fellow doctor Clive Gibbons (Geoff Paine). O'Grady returned again as Beverly in 2025, for the storyline around Remi Varga-Murphy's (Naomi Rukavina) memory loss.

== Casting ==
Beverly Marshall was originally played by Lisa Armytage. Armytage felt her busy Neighbours schedule meant she was away from her young daughter too often. Armytage quit the role in 1988 to allow herself more time with her family. The script writers decided to send the character off to a conference for a few months. This allowed them time to cast Shaunna O'Grady in the role. O'Grady took over the role of Beverly in March 1989, after she successfully passed a screen test when she dropped into Grundys while passing through Melbourne. O'Grady relocated to Melbourne from Sydney to be closer to the studios. She described taking over the role from Lisa Armytage as "very strange".

On her experience of joining the cast she said, "It really was fun, as I recall. Cast and crew were friendly, and we laughed a LOT". However, she found it hard taking on the role as she had not seen the show before, and no one told could tell her about Beverly. There was a notable difference between the two actresses, O'Grady was blonde while Armytage was a brunette. Of this, O'Grady said "We don't look at all alike, obviously we aren't the same person and there's been no attempt to make me look like Lisa". She also added, "I think I will just be recognised as a different actor and go from there".

== Development ==
=== Introduction and marriage to Jim Robinson ===
Beverly as portrayed by Lisa Armytage in 1987 (left) and Shaunna O'Grady in 1990 (right), with noticeably light blonde hair.

Beverly was introduced as the show's new GP, following Clive Gibbons' (Geoff Paine) departure, and a love interest for Jim Robinson (Alan Dale). An Inside Soap writer described her as having a "prickly persona", while O'Grady said she was "very buttoned-down". Beverly and Jim are brought together by Jim's cousin Hilary Robinson (Anne Scott-Pendlebury), after she learns that Beverly will be in Erinsborough for a conference. Hilary asks Jim to take care of her friend for a few days. Of Beverly and Jim's early relationship, Armytage stated: She's not even interested in him to start off with. Jim thinks he has been set up by his cousin Hilary, which makes him very much on the defensive. He's prepared for us to go out to lunch, but he treats Beverly so abominably, and she is very huffy when she realises what he thinks. So it takes a while before they start to relate to each other properly." Jim soon learns that he has many interests in common with Beverly, including golf and fishing, and they start a relationship, which was described as being "intense and frequently difficult" by Neil Wallis and Dave Hogan of The Neighbours Factfile.

When Beverly saves the life of Jim's mother-in-law Helen Daniels (Anne Haddy), she earns Jim's "undying gratitude". Jim and Beverly marry at Number 26 Ramsay Street in February 1988, and Beverly became the show's first female character to refuse to take her husband's name. The pair have a low-key wedding and Dale told Amanda Zachary from TV Week that "it is one of those family affairs - just a nice quiet wedding at home." Dale admitted that he was in shock when he learned the two characters would marry. Dale also explained that Jim's "life is turned upside down" after he marries Beverly. Writers used their marriage to reengineer Jim's characterisation, giving him more "basic warmth and affection". He credited a good rapport with Armytage for making Jim's persona change happen with ease.

The couple's marriage is strained by Beverly's desire to have a child. Josephine Monroe, author of Neighbours: The First 10 Years, wrote that Beverly became a "hormonal mess" as her desperation for a baby increased. Jim thought caring for her niece and nephew was enough, but he eventually agrees to try for a baby. Beverly falls pregnant, but suffers a miscarriage. She then considers adoption, but Jim is rejected for being too old. Beverly briefly fosters an abandoned child, but when he is taken away, she "fell to pieces". O'Grady liked this storyline and how Beverly "was on the edge", but she was disappointed when it "petered out" and thought it could have been more interesting.

=== Departure and returns ===
When O'Grady's contract came up for renewal, producers took the decision not to renew it. O'Grady said that she would have continued with Neighbours if it had been up to her. Beverly's exit storyline began with the introduction of her former boyfriend Ewan O'Brien (Peter Sumner), who works with her on some research, causing further problems in her marriage. Jim and Beverly are driven apart and their marriage soon ends. They divorce and Beverly decides to leave Erinsborough. O'Grady's departure led to a change in storyline direction for Neighbours in a bid to increase ratings over soap operas in both Britain and Australia. In July 2005, O'Grady joined several former cast members for a cameo appearance in the serial's 20th anniversary episode "Friends for Twenty Years".

On 22 January 2019, Filiz Mehmedova of Digital Spy confirmed that O'Grady would be reprising the role once again, after fans noticed a name card for Beverly in a photograph of a table read. Armytage later revealed that producers had initially asked her to return as Beverly and she accepted their offer. However, the producers failed to realise that Armytage was now living in the United Kingdom and they were forced to cancel her return, as it was not financially viable for the production to fund it. The character returned on 19 March 2019. Beverly is contacted by her former stepson Paul Robinson (Stefan Dennis), who asks for her help in determining whether Finn Kelly (Rob Mills) is lying about having amnesia, as Beverly is now a specialist in psychological trauma caused by brain injuries. Paul also has "an ulterior motive" for contacting Beverly, as he wants to be close to those who had a connection with Jim, who he saw in a vision at Christmas. Beverly returns the following month to lead a hypnotherapy session with Andrea Somers (Madeleine West). She later helps Andrea's mother Heather Schilling (Kerry Armstrong) to recall the traumatic birth of her daughters.

Producers later paired Beverly with Clive, shortly after ending his relationship with Sheila Canning. Beverly and Clive attend a wine-tasting event, which "goes awry" when Beverly accidentally bumps into Sheila, who, believing it was deliberate, then throws wine over Beverly. Sheila's jealousy leads her to gatecrash a dinner party that David Tanaka (Takaya Honda) and Aaron Brennan (Matt Wilson) are throwing for Beverly and Clive, as she wants to know more about their relationship. This then leads to a love triangle storyline, as Clive kisses Sheila when he walks her back home. The pair have an affair for a few weeks, until Clive eventually breaks up with Beverly. However, when Sheila apologises to Beverley about the affair, it emerges that Clive only mentioned that he was reuniting with Sheila. A "scorned" Beverley pours a bucket of manure over Sheila's head in revenge. Claire Crick of What's on TV questioned whether this would lead to Beverly's exit, saying "With Beverley's life torn apart by Clive and Sheila's lies, is this the last we have seen of her? Or is her manure dumping just the start of her plan to get revenge?"

The character returned in 2020. O'Grady reprised the role again in July 2025, as Beverly takes over Remi Varga-Murphy's (Naomi Rukavina) case and believes that she is suffering from systematised amnesia, after she sustains a head injury and fails to recognise her wife.

== Storylines ==
Beverly accepts an invitation from Hilary Robinson to come to Erinsborough for a visit. Hilary tries to set Beverly and her cousin, Jim Robinson, up together and Beverly falls for Jim. She sets up a surgery in the medical practice following the departure of Clive Gibbons and moves to Erinsborough permanently. Beverly helps deliver Daphne Clarke's (Elaine Smith) son, Jamie (S.J. Dey), after she goes into labour while on a fishing trip with her husband Des (Paul Keane), Jim and Beverly. Beverly's former boyfriend Stephen Armstrong (Peter Adams) comes back into her life and she chooses him over Jim. However, Stephen is violent towards her and she throws him out. Beverly begs Jim to take her back and he proposes to her.

Beverly and Jim marry at Jim's house on Valentine's Day. Their honeymoon plans are dashed when Beverly's niece and nephew, Katie (Sally Jensen) and Todd Landers (Kristian Schmid) run away. When they are found, they reveal that their parents Annette (Tania Uren) and Bob (Robin Harrison; Bruce Kilpatrick) are having marital problems. Beverly and Jim agree to let Katie and Todd stay with them. Beverly worries if Jim's mother-in-law Helen Daniels will accept her, however, Helen is happy that Jim has found someone. Beverly asks Jim if they can try for a baby, but Jim is reluctant after having raised four children of his own. However, he agrees and Beverly discovers she is pregnant, but she suffers a miscarriage after being mugged on the way home from the surgery.

When Debra Turner (Daisy Cameron), a young single mother leaves her baby son, Rhys (Anna and Evie Kasmatis) at Beverly's surgery, Beverly takes the child home and decides to apply for legal guardianship of him. However, Debra returns to town with the child's father, Adam Delaney (Joel Richardson) and they begin blackmailing Beverly. Jim finds out when he notices that large amounts of money is missing from their bank account. Beverly tells him everything and Jim calls the police. Rhys is taken away and put up for adoption. Beverly's former partner Ewan O'Brien asks her to help with a research paper and Jim becomes jealous of him. The tension between Beverly and Jim eventually forces Beverly to take a reluctant Todd and move to the flat above her surgery.

Beverly then discovers she is pregnant again and she reconciles with Jim, but she miscarries again. She is told that she cannot carry a child to full term. When Ewan asks Beverly to join him in Perth, Beverly decides to leave Erinsborough. Just before she leaves, Jim tells her that he wants to remain friends. Beverly and Jim divorce the following year. Years later, when Annalise Hartman (Kimberly Davies) returns to Ramsay Street to show the residents a documentary she has made, Beverly features in it and she says she owes her professional confidence to her time on Ramsay Street.

Beverly returns to Erinsborough after nearly thirty years away to meet with Paul and assess Finn Kelly, who is believed to be suffering from retrograde amnesia. Beverly asks Paul why he contacted her, and he tells her that he knows she has changed her speciality to the psychiatric effects of serious brain injuries. She presses him further and he explains that he has been thinking about everyone connected with Jim. After talking with Finn, Beverly recommends that they tell him the circumstances that led to him being hospitalised. Beverly then tells Finn that he was pushed off a cliff by Susan Kennedy (Jackie Woodburne) during an altercation. Beverly carries out an EEG on Finn and she is confident of the amnesia diagnosis.

Beverly is called to give her medical opinion about Finn's brain injury and memory loss at his sentencing hearing. Beverly explains that the head injuries Finn suffered while he was held hostage some years before caused an aneurysm in his brain, and that the trauma from the torture he endured likely led to his destructive personality. Beverly says that Finn was not born a psychopath and that his amnesia diagnosis is conclusive. Beverly bonds with Paul's son and fellow doctor David Tanaka over Finn's case, and thinks psychiatry or neurology could be a good speciality for him. Beverly meets with Andrea Somers at Lassiters Hotel for a hypnotherapy session, and causes her to recall a memory from her childhood. Beverly goes to a wine tasting at The 82 with her date, Clive. She bumps into Clive's former partner Sheila Canning, spilling her wine. Sheila believes that Beverly did it deliberately and she throws a glass of wine at her.

Beverly congratulates David on his research paper about Finn, and asks if he would like to speak at a neuropsychology symposium in Canberra. David invites Beverly and Clive over for dinner, which is interrupted by Sheila. David's husband Aaron Brennan admits that Sheila wanted him to get intel on Beverly and Clive, and Beverly calls out Sheila's childish behaviour. Clive supports Beverly when she learns her niece has been in a car accident. A few weeks later, Clive breaks up with Beverly for Sheila. The two women meet in the complex and Sheila admits that she and Clive have actually been having an affair, leading Beverly to dump a bucket of manure over her head.

Five years later, Beverly returns when Remi Varga-Murphy (Naomi Rukavina) is unable to recognize her wife Cara (Sara West) after suffering from a head injury. Beverly is assigned Remi's case at the hospital and diagnoses her as suffering from systematised amnesia.

== Reception ==
Beverly was named as a "firm favourite with viewers" in John Kercher's 1989 book, Neighbours: Facts, Features, Interviews With Your Favourite TV Stars. Kercher also named Beverly's relationship with Jim as "an intriguing storyline". Ruth Deller named Beverly as Ramsay Street's "superdoc". In another feature, Lowculture called Beverly the "resident awesome all-powerful Neighbours doctor who came in between Clive Gibbons and Karl Kennedy". The BBC said Beverly's most notable moment was "When she slapped one of her patients." Donna Hay from What's on TV featured Beverly and Jim in a feature profiling soap "marriages made in hell". Hay noted that Jim should have known his marriage "would be short-lived" because Beverly refused to change her surname. Hay noted that Beverly was more interested in performing live saving operations than conforming to the "proper wife" image Jim wanted. Hay defended Beverly, stating the breakdown of the marriage was not entirely her fault because of Jim's behaviour in the miscarriage story. Hay joked that Jim "acted as if she'd had a mild dose of the flu. No wonder she packed her bags."
