= Jamie Clarke (Neighbours) =

Fictional character from the Australian soap opera Neighbours

- Neighbours character
- Angus McLaren as Jamie Clarke (2003)
- Portrayed by: S.J. Dey (1987–1989); Ryder Susman (1989); Nicholas and James Mason (1989–1990); Angus McLaren (2003)
- Duration: 1987–1990, 2003
- First appearance: 30 July 1987
- Last appearance: 17 December 2003
- Introduced by: Reg Watson (1987); Ric Pellizzeri (2003)
In-universe information
- Father: Des Clarke
- Mother: Daphne Clarke
- Grandfathers: Malcolm Clarke; Allen Lawrence
- Grandmothers: Eileen Clarke; Tina Bentley
- Aunts: Sally Wells
- Other relatives: Harry Henderson

Jamie Clarke is a fictional character from the Australian soap opera Neighbours. The character was originally played by S.J. Dey from the character's birth and introduction on 30 July 1987. Ryder Susman briefly took over the role in 1989, as it was becoming more obvious that Dey was a girl. Dey returned to the role, but later in 1989, brothers Nicholas and James Mason took over the role of Jamie until the character departed in 1990. In 2003, the character returned, this time played by Angus McLaren.

== Creation and development ==
In November 1986, Stephen Cook of TV Week previewed upcoming changes to the Neighbours cast and confirmed that popular couple Des Clarke (Paul Keane) and Daphne Clarke's (Elaine Smith) "long-awaited" first child would be born during 1987. He reported that producers had not yet decided whether the baby would be a girl or a boy, but it would be born healthy in the middle of the year. Smith later said that Daphne's pregnancy lasted over the usual nine months as producers deliberately dragged it out to tie in with other storylines. Daphne gives birth "at the most inopportune moment possible", as she and Des are enjoying a picnic with friends Jim Robinson (Alan Dale) and his new partner Beverly Marshall (Lisa Armytage), who ends up delivering the baby. Des and Daphne's son was the serial's first baby to be born on-screen. The couple have trouble deciding on a name, with Des' mother insisting that he is called Kingsley as it is a traditional family name. They later settle on James Kingsley Clarke.

Neighbours' casting director Jan Russ was responsible for casting the role of Jamie. As he was born premature, this created a dilemma for Russ. She told Meno Toutsidis from Sunday Mail TV Plus that all the babies auditioned for the role were too large. She added that "I had several pregnant women on stand-by and things were getting desperate." A member of the show's production team informed Russ that they knew someone who had just given birth. Russ met with the family and hired their newborn, named SJ Dey, for the role. Dey's parents did not want to reveal what the initials stood for and this lead everyone on the show to assume that Dey was male. Dey was actually female and this was later publicised by the producers. Rachel Friend who plays Bronwyn Davies, took part in the 1988 interview and both she and Russ referred to SJ as male. Dey was only allowed to work on set for four hours over three days per week and all scenes had to be filmed during this allocated time. Scripts would often be rewritten to suit her mood and responses during scenes. Dey was temporarily replaced by Ryder Susman after two years, as it was becoming more obvious that she was a girl. The role was later recast to twin boys James and Nicholas Mason.

In 2003, producers reintroduced the character for a guest stint and recast the role to Angus McLaren. Jamie is first mentioned when Susan Kennedy (Jackie Woodburne) finds a letter addressed to him under the carpet of Number 28 Ramsay Street, where Jamie used to live with his father. Shortly after, Stuart Parker (Blair McDonough) encounters a "scruffy looking" teenager stealing from his caravan and when he catches him, the boy tells Stuart that his name is Jamie Clarke. An Inside Soap reporter thought long-term viewers would instantly recognise the name, while it takes Stuart a bit longer. McDonough stated "They get to know a bit about each other and Jamie explains that he had a falling out with his father, and ran away from home. After a while, Stuart realises that he's the same boy that Karl and Susann Kennedy are looking for. He also remembers that the letter they found contained valuable shares from his mother Daphne – so Jamie could be a rich kid!" Jamie and Stuart go straight to Ramsay Street, but getting hold of the money proves difficult. McDonough explained that Jamie cannot claim the shares without his father's permission because he is not of legal age, so they have to find out where Des is, adding "And that's anybody's guess!"

== Storylines ==
Jamie is born to Des and Daphne in July 1987. Shortly after his birth, Jamie suffers breathing problems, but recovers. Daphne dies several months before Jamie's first birthday and Des is forced to raise him alone. When Jamie wanders off one day at a supermarket, Des is frantic with worry but luckily Bronwyn Davies returns Jamie to him safely. After an initial argument with Des, Bronwyn then becomes Jamie's nanny. Jamie causes Des more worry in several incidents including swallowing a toy drumstick and nearly drowning. When Des meets Fiona, they become engaged and he and Jamie leave Erinsborough. Some years later, Des' marriage to Fiona breaks down and he and Jamie move to Adelaide. Des suffers a breakdown and is admitted to hospital and Jamie is put into care.

After bullying from some older boys, Jamie, now 16, flees and returns to Erinsborough. Stuart Parker befriends Jamie after catching him trying to steal from the caravan park where he is staying. Stuart introduces Jamie to Karl and Susan Kennedy who are now living in Jamie's old home and they tell him they have been trying to contact him regarding shares Daphne had left for him under the linoleum years before. Jamie confirms his identity and Karl explains that Jamie will only be able to claim them with Des' consent. Jamie goes cold on the idea after his father is mentioned and leaves the shares with the Kennedys.

Jamie finds Stuart's picture on the front of the Erinsborough News labelling him the ring-leader of Life Mechanics, a scam perpetrated by Jonathan Verne (Oscar Redding). Jamie accuses him of using him to get his hands on his shares and refuses to have anything to do with him. Stuart explains the truth of the matter and he and Jamie reconcile. Stuart takes Jamie to meet Harold Bishop (Ian Smith), a friend of Des and Daphne's. Harold arranges via a contact at the Salvation Army to get in touch with Des and is successful. Jamie is happy and agrees to return to his father in Adelaide in time for Christmas.

== Reception ==
A writer for the BBC described Jamie's most notable moments as "Being involved in a car crash which left his mother, Daphne in a coma" and "Returning to the Street in 2003 to claim his inheritance." Referring to the character's premature birth and actor recasts, Josephine Monroe, author of Neighbours: The First 10 Years, said Jamie "continued to be something of a trouble-maker, both on and off screen." Anne Robinson, writing for the Daily Mirror, was disappointed that readers failed to nominate Jamie for Best Exit in the newspaper's Soap Awards. She thought he was "most deserving" because he "left his mother's womb in one piece despite Daphne giving birth with her tights on". An Inside Soap writer observed that "long-time viewers couldn't help but feel excited" by the mention of the character before his return. Sam Soap from Inside Soap included Jamie's return in a feature profiling positively received storylines. Soap stated that Jamie's reappearance made him feel "nostalgic" and wished for Des' return too.
