= Mark Stevens (singer) =

Australian singer, songwriter, and actor

- Born: Hobart, Tasmania, Australia
- Occupations: Actor, singer, worship leader
- Years active: 1985–present
- Spouse: Bethan Stevens
- Children: 2

Mark Stevens is an Australian singer, songwriter, actor and worship leader. Stevens began his career after a winning a talent contest in his birth place, Hobart. His win attracted the attention the producer of Network 10's musical variety show Young Talent Time. Stevens was invited to join the cast and his family relocated to Melbourne to facilitate his career. As a member of Young Talent Time, Stevens recorded music for an official album release and took part in the Australian city tour. He decided to leave the series after more than three years. He then successfully auditioned for the role of teenage tearaway Nick Page, in the soap opera Neighbours.

Stevens remained with the show for two years before concentrating solely on his music career. He signed a record deal with major label BMG and teamed up with Nik Kershaw creating new music. During his time with the company he released the singles "Broken English" and "This Is The Way To Heaven". His career became affected by his personal life and a drug addiction and he parted ways with BMG. In 1996, Stevens began to overcome his addiction and became a practising Christian. His affiliation with the Hillsong Church helped him become a worship leader. He began working on new music with Hillsong Worship and later had an eleven year career with the Abundant Life Church. In 2011, Stevens released his debut studio album, "To Be With You", based on his experiences with God.

== Career ==
Stevens was born in Hobart, Tasmania. Stevens took an interest in music as a child and later formed a band with his brother, Brett. Stevens entered a local talent contest and made it to the final round. The winner was decided by a judging panel, which included a producer from Network 10's musical variety show Young Talent Time.

Stevens won the contest and his win was reported on television news and featured in newspapers. In the weeks that followed, Stevens' parents were contacted by the producers of Young Talent Time, asking him to audition. They flew Stevens and his mother to the studio in Melbourne, Victoria. Stevens auditioned with a performance of the song "Ben" and was immediately offered a place on the show. Stevens accepted the role, which meant his family had to relocate to Melbourne.

Stevens was just thirteen when he the joined the cast of Young Talent Time. The series featured a number of young performers and help them start their singing and acting careers. He performed alongside Dannii Minogue, Greg Poynton and Vince Del Tito. Stevens remained in school, filmed the show each Saturday and also participated in the show's arena tour of major Australian cities. In 1987, the cast released the album titled "Phenomenon", which featured Stevens on several tracks. Stevens worked on the show for three years before leaving to pursue acting. While living in Melbourne, Stevens began to study music at the Melba Memorial Conservatorium of Music.

After leaving, Stevens got a new agent to help direct his music career. Instead, his agent put him forward for an audition for the Australian soap opera Neighbours. He went onto secure the role of Nick Page. Stevens auditioned alongside forty-four other actors. The character was written as a teenage "tearaway" who liked graffiti and art. Stevens had no previous acting experience prior to the role.

In July 1989, Stevens revealed he had been working on his music career. He had created some recordings and noted that they would sound different from the works of other musicians who had left Neighbours. Stevens recorded his own music in a home studio. Stevens released one of his home recordings, titled "Playing Hard To Get", as an Australian only single. Stevens' contract with Neighbours expired in December 1989 and was not renewed.

The show's popularity in the United Kingdom gained Stevens an international audience. He moved to the country where he began theatre work and was soon signed to a record deal with BMG. He signed a management deal with Kenny Smith, who was also managing the Eurythmics. He began working on new music with Nik Kershaw, for his debut album and toured with the band Take That. During this time, BMG and RCA promoted to releases "Broken English" and "This Is The Way To Heaven". Stevens signed with The Wheatley Organisation to manage his career in Australia. In late 1990, Stevens acted in a British pantomime performance of Aladdin, playing the title role. In February 1991, Stevens had a guest appearance on the Nine Network comedy series, All Together Now, in which he played the role of Derek. He played a heavy metal music rocker type character, who is the boyfriend of Jane Hall's character, Anna.

Stevens' career began to suffer from his then secret alcohol and drug addiction, which he developed from age sixteen. He became increasingly dependant on recreational drugs and his record label began to notice his behaviour when he arrived to recording sessions unable to sing. Stevens later recalled arriving at the photo shoot for his debut album cover, vomiting and drug taking. After he and his record label parted ways, Stevens returned to Australia. He later returned to live with his parents in Hobart, but his addiction continued. Stevens later returned to England, with his brother Brett and they attempted to secure a new record deal. It was thereafter that Stevens developed a heroin addiction.

Stevens managed to overcome his ten year addiction. He has credited an experience with God at a house party in August 1996 as being a major factor in his change of lifestyle. Following the experience Stevens decided to follow Christianity and became involved with the Hillsong Church. Stevens originally joined the Hillsong Church for four years both in London and Sydney. There he wrote and toured music with Hillsong Worship under the leadership of Brian and Bobbie Houston & Darlene Zschech. Stevens spent the next eleven years working as a Worship Pastor and Creative Director at the Abundant Life Church in Bradford, United Kingdom.

In 2011, Stevens released his debut studio album titled "To Be With You". The album features a collection of songs about his personal journey and religion. Stevens later began travelling creating religious workshops and building worship teams. Stevens described the album as "songs that were birthed through an intimate and passionate relationship with his Saviour." In 2014, Stevens completed work on his second studio album. Stevens married Bethan, the daughter of Abundant Life Church pastor Paul Scanlon. They have two children together and settled in Bradford, England.

== Filmography ==
Year	Title	Role	Notes
1985-1988	Young Talent Time	As himself	Regular role
1988-1990	Neighbours	Nick Page	Regular role
1991	All Together Now	Derek	Guest role

== Discography ==
=== Studio albums ===
List of studio albums
Title	Album details
To Be With You	Released: 25 October 2011 (United Kingdom); Label: Mark Stevens Music, SHOUT!; Formats: CD, digital download
Bring Down Heaven	Released: 2015 (United Kingdom); Label: Mark Stevens Music; Formats: CD, digital download

=== Singles ===
List of singles
Title	Year	Album
"Broken English"	1990	Non-album singles
"This Is The Way To Heaven"	1991	Non-album singles
