= Hilary Robinson =

Fictional character from Neighbours

- Neighbours character
- Portrayed by: Anne Scott-Pendlebury
- Duration: 1987–1990, 2005, 2015–2018, 2023–2025
- First appearance: 25 June 1987
- Last appearance: 5 November 2025
- Created by: Reg Watson
- Introduced by: Reg Watson (1987); Don Battye (1988); Ric Pellizzeri (2005); Jason Herbison (2015)
In-universe information
- Occupation: Librarian; Administrator; Retired
- Family: Robinson
- Sons: Matt Robinson
- Grandfathers: Sam Robinson
- Uncles: James Robinson
- First cousins: Jim Robinson
- Other relatives: Paul Robinson; Scott Robinson; Lucy Robinson; Daniel Robinson; Amy Williams; Jimmy Williams; David Tanaka; Leo Tanaka; Elle Robinson

Hilary Robinson is a fictional character from the Australian soap opera Neighbours, played by Anne Scott-Pendlebury. The character first appeared on-screen during the episode broadcast on 25 June 1987. Hilary departed the show on 28 February 1990, following Scott-Pendlebury's decision to quit in 1989. Scott-Pendlebury reprised her role in 2005 for the serial's 20th anniversary episode, and again in February 2015 ahead of the 30th anniversary. Writers established that Hilary is back living in Erinsborough, so she could continue to make sporadic appearances until 2018, and returned again in 2023. Hilary was added to the show's opening titles in April 2025, and made her final appearance on 5 November 2025, shortly before the show's conclusion.

Hilary is characterised as a bossy and meddling woman who lacks romance and seeks comfort interfering with her Neighbours' personal lives. Hilary's main storyline was mothering an illegitimate child, Matt Robinson (Ashley Paske). He arrives in Erinsborough to forge a relationship with his birth mother. The character's "hard-edged approach to life" mellowed during the storyline.

== Casting ==
Scott-Pendlebury joined the cast in 1987 for Scott Robinson (Jason Donovan) and Charlene Mitchell's (Kylie Minogue) wedding. The actress commented, "Hilary would then turn up at Christmas and weddings, as annoying relatives do!"

== Development ==
=== Characterisation ===
Hilary Robinson was like an older Julie – on the surface, a very nice person who genuinely wanted to help others. But those very do-gooder qualities were what drove everyone up the wall. Hilary was an organiser of other people's lives. She liked to take over and manipulate, always for the other person's "good". Her intentions were the best, but the way she carried them out was often infuriating.

— A Neighbours.com writer on Hilary (2002)

Hilary is characterised as a "stuffy and proper" woman and not an ideal mother figure. Her bossy manner and liking to organise everyone's lives angers other characters. This surprises Hilary because she never sets out to offend others and is not vindictive. She is an honest person which is important to her, though others perceive it as tactlessness. Hilary enjoys meddling in other people's personal lives. She does so because she lacks romance in her own life and does not have male friends. The character does have a neat and attractive dress style, but men become alarmed by her bossy tendencies. Hilary also believes that men only want sex and is wary of any attention.

In 2024, Pendlebury recalled that Hilary was quite an unpleasant character from her introduction. She described her initial dialogue as being "uncomplimentary" towards Charlene. When Hilary returns as a "much older woman", Pendlebury believed she is "no more likeable than she was" then. Pendlebury revealed that some of Hilary's clothing she wears in 2024 were part of Hilary's original wardrobe. She was shocked that production had kept them stored for more than thirty years. She revealed that "the cardigans are all the same and I just seem to slip back comfortably into them."

=== Introduction and family ===
Hilary was introduced into the show as the cousin of Jim Robinson (Alan Dale). She arrives in Ramsay Street to attend Scott Robinson and Charlene Mitchell's wedding. Her first storyline saw her nearly exposing the secret that relative Paul Robinson (Stefan Dennis) has married Gail Lewis (Fiona Corke) for business reasons after spying on them. Dennis later recalled the storyline as one of his favourites because "it was just silly, fun stuff to play."

Scott-Pendlebury was invited to join the show's regular cast following the departure of Nell Mangel (Vivean Gray). Hilary plays a similar role to Nell. Scott-Pendlebury told David Brown from TV Week that "I was warned that playing an unpleasant character, I might get unpleasantness on the street." This did not concern the actress because she was "delighted" to get the opportunity to play Hilary. The show soon invested in a backstory for the character. They played a storyline in which she had an illegitimate child, Matt Williams (Ashley Paske), who was later introduced into the show when he tracks Hilary down. She had become pregnant with Matt following a short romance when she was aged twenty. Hilary rejects Matt because she feels ashamed and fears a negative reaction from her Neighbours. But he decides to stay and convinces Hilary to tell the Robinson family the truth. Writers portrayed Hilary as being "worried sick" about anyone discovering she is an unmarried mother. Other characters soon become suspicious about the truth behind Hilary and Matt's relationship. Despite this, Hilary gifts Matt with a piece of his father's sheet music. Matt gets his friend, Nick Page (Mark Stevens) to play the music, which makes Hilary cry. After their secret is revealed, they go onto create a strong relationship. A writer from Neighbours.com assessed that "her slightly 'hard-edged' approach to life was softened slightly" through her relationship with Matt.

=== Departure and returns ===
Hilary stayed in the show for around a year, before Scott-Pendlebury left the series in 1989 at a time many of her fellow cast members left. Her departure from the series was publicised in December 1989. TV Week's Brown reported that producers had decided to "rest" the character with the potential of a future return. Producers sent the character to live in Adelaide.

In April 2005, it was announced that Scott-Pendlebury had returned to make a cameo appearance in the 20th anniversary special episode. On 28 November 2014, it was announced that Scott-Pendlebury had reprised her role as part of Neighbours' 30th anniversary celebrations. Hilary returned on 25 February. Script writers had written Hilary as living back in Erinsborough. Jason Herbison told Daniel Kilkelly from Digital Spy that the move would allow Hilary to continue making appearances in the show. Hilary returned the following year on 5 November 2015. She made further appearances on 10 November 2017, 31 January 2018, and 5 March 2018. The character made a brief appearance on 17 October 2023. Hilary's return featured Terese Willis (Rebekah Elmaloglou) asking Hilary for support over her retirement complex ideas. Hilary refuses because it threatens the local school, Erinsborough High with closure.

Another return for Hilary was confirmed in May 2024, when the character was featured in a spoiler trailer showcasing upcoming storylines. Pendlebury revealed that she was "humbled as a performer" to have been invited back, adding "I think she left a mark" on the show. Daniel Kilkelly from Digital Spy confirmed that Hilary's return story features her purchasing an apartment in Terese's retirement complex, Eirini Rising. Terese reacts angrily about Hilary's return, believing that Paul has brought her the apartment to remain relevant in her life. However, Hilary insists she purchased the property of her own accord, despite being against the Eirini Rising development in her October 2023 return. Hilary changed her kind since the school and the retirement complex now co-exist together. The show's executive producer Jason Herbison told David Knox from TV Tonight that he envisioned the Eirini Rising storyline as a means to reintroduce the show's older characters in an "organic way" in new storylines. He added his belief that the old character still "have so much to offer."

Pendlebury revealed that Hilary views the retirement complex as "luxurious" and purchases an apartment with good views. She admitted that she would "hate" to live near Hilary, because she "will probably make everybody's live a misery in this complex." Hilary's return coincides with Harold Bishop's (Ian Smith) return to the series as he also buys an apartment. Smith told Sarah Ellis from Inside Soap that Hilary and Harold would feature in scenes together. He added that he initially thought writers were planning a romance between them but later realised they were not. In April 2025, Hilary was added to the show's opening titles in a scene including other Eirini Rising residents. Hilary made her final appearance on 5 November 2025, alongside the other Eirini Rising residents, shortly before the show's conclusion. In a behind the scenes video posted to the show's social media accounts, Scott-Pendlebury said that returning to the show as Hilary "has been very special" and was grateful for the opportunity to see a "development of the characters".

== Storylines ==
Hilary arrives in Ramsay Street to attend Scott and Charlene's wedding. While staying at Number 22, she discovers Paul has married Gail for business reasons and nearly exposes their secret. Hilary interferes with Jim's love life, match-making him with her friend Beverly Marshall (Lisa Armytage), whom he eventually marries. She is thrown out of the Robinson household for telling Nick he is not part of the Robinson family. She moves in with Sharon Davies (Jessica Muschamp) while Edith Chubb (Irene Inescort) is away. She then begins feuding with Joe Mangel (Mark Little) and Kerry Bishop (Linda Hartley-Clark). Kerry becomes enraged by Hilary after she sets up an aviary; Kerry, an animal rights activist, releases the birds and Hilary argues with her. She attempts to save some of the birds, but falls from a ladder. Bronwyn Davies (Rachel Friend) finds her and saves her life.

Matt is revealed to be Hilary's son. She initially tries to keep it a secret until he blackmails her, telling her he will walk out on her for good, in turn making Hilary publicly reveal him as her son. Hilary begins a relationship with Kenneth Muir (Roger Boyce); they later split up when he finds out Hilary has been tax evading. Hilary decides to leave Ramsay Street permanently; this angers Paul, after Hilary withdraws her funding of the Robinson Corporation. Hilary suggests Matt come back to Adelaide with her but he decides to stay and she leaves alone. Hilary later makes a cameo appearance in Annalise Hartman's (Kimberley Davies) documentary. She credits her time living in the street as helping her rebuild her relationship with Matt.

In 2015, Hilary and her friend Janice Stedler (Helen Noonan) go to the Erinsborough community centre for their flu shots, and Hilary complains about the waiting times to Karl Kennedy (Alan Fletcher). She later apologises and explains that she is unhappy about the mayor cutting community services to help fund the Erinsborough Festival. When the mayor, Paul, turns up to talk about the festival with a journalist, Hilary interrupts to say she is a victim of his budget cuts. Paul takes Hilary back to his apartment and berates for her actions. While waiting for her bus, Hilary meets Daniel Robinson (Tim Phillipps), Scott and Charlene's son. She admits to Paul that she moved back to Erinsborough after a falling out with Matt's wife. Hilary threatens to stay at Paul's apartment for the night, so he gives her money to start up some of the community services again. Harold drives Hilary home.

A couple of months later, Hilary returns to give Paul his daughter Amy Williams' (Zoe Cramond) last known address. When Naomi Canning (Morgana O'Reilly) tells Hilary that Paul no longer wants to find Amy, Hilary says she will track her down instead, unless she can have Paul's dog B2 to keep her company. Paul agrees and Hilary tells him he can visit B2 anytime. After learning that Paul wants to close Erinsborough High to build a housing development, Hilary returns on behalf of the pensions association to voice their opposition. Hilary also makes it clear that she is displeased about Paul keeping Amy's return from her, especially after she helped to find her. Paul hosts a family lunch for Hilary and invites Daniel, Amy and her son Jimmy (Darcy Tadich). Hilary then promises to take Paul's arguments back to the pensions association. Hilary invests fifty dollars in Paul and Amy's gazeebo business. But Amy decides not to go ahead with the business because of Paul's deceit. Imogen Willis (Ariel Kaplan) offers legal advice to Hilary and she demands her money back from Paul. Daniel manages to diffuse the legal proceedings by taking her out for dinner.

A few weeks later, Hilary is introduced to Doug Willis (Terence Donovan) and his family, who are looking for a care home for him as he is suffering from Alzheimer's disease. Hilary tells them about the home where she is living, but Doug becomes irritated by the conversation and insults Hilary. She later informs Doug's son, Brad (Kip Gamblin), that Doug has been blacklisted from the home. Hilary informs mayor Sonya Mitchell (Eve Morey) that the pensioners association has received too much funding. They relocate the funds to the Erinsborough High after school study programme on the condition that Hilary becomes the administrator of the programme. Paul invites Hilary and her friends to a silent afternoon tea dance run by Courtney Grixti (Emma Lane), who he introduces as his fiancée. Elly Conway (Jodi Anasta) introduces herself as Susan's niece and Hilary complains about Susan not having kept her job open at the school, while she was looking after her son's issues in Adelaide. Elly admits that she does not know anything about it and Hilary walks off. Amy asks Hilary to come to Paul's apartment and pretend she is moving in, so Amy can teach him a lesson about asking before going ahead with something. Paul later asks Hilary to act as a spokesperson for his clubhouse idea located at his new housing development.

Five years later, Hilary has a meeting with Terese regarding her planned retirement village. When Jane Harris (Annie Jones) interrupts and tells Hilary that the village is planned to be where Erinsborough High is located, Hilary abruptly departs the meeting. She ultimately buys an apartment and moves into the complex upon its opening. Upon hearing of this, Terese confronts Hilary and Paul and accuses Paul of buying the apartment for Hilary, but she abruptly denies it. She later complains after students from Erisborough High steal her belongings from her apartment. Hilary later facilitates a protest about the Lassiters Boylesque dancing event run by Krista Sinclair (Majella Davis), and gets Moira Tohu (Robyn Arthur) and Gino Esposito (Shane McNamara) to protest on her behalf. Hilary and Moira eavesdrop on Karl and Susan Kennedy (Jackie Woodburne) discussing potentially giving Terese work at Eirini Rising after being forced to step down. The two run a meeting at Harold's Café with the residents as a result of what they overheard. Hilary later watches over Paul and Terese as they select photos for the Erinsborough Lights Up event. She attends the Lost Loves photo display, and Paul adds a photo on her behalf, which pleasantly surprises her. Hilary and Moira introduce themselves to Vera Punt (Sally-Anne Upton) as she moves into Eirene Rising, and are disgusted by her gossip about them. She is later approached by Agnes Adair (Anne Charleston), who asks her where JJ Varga-Murphy (Riley Bryant) is. Hilary later hangs out in the Eirini games room and watches Vera and Moira argue, before being asked out by Monte Jones (Dennis Coard).

== Reception ==
Ruth Deller of entertainment website Lowculture commented on Hilary stating: "Jim's cousin Hilary was one of the street's best busybodies. She was mostly a recurring guest character in the series, although she did have a stint as a permanent resident. She was a bit of a 'fusspot' but with her heart in the right place". In her book, The Neighbours Programme Guide, author Josephine Monroe assessed that "Hilary is not anyone's ideal mother – she barely scrapes through in the wicked stepmother stakes – and Matt was disappointed when she showed no interest in getting to know him." To celebrate the 20th anniversary of Neighbours, the BBC asked readers to nominate their 20 favourite obscure characters. Hilary came in fourth place and the readers called her "perpetually bitchy and irascible – got on everyone's nerves and was hugely funny". They added, "Appeared sporadically in the late 80s. She wasn't based in Erinsborough but somehow got Jim and Beverly together – as if Dr Bev would ever have been a friend of such an old witch!!". Barbara Toner from Radio Times branded the character "Jim's clever but sour-faced cousin." Ruth Hessey from The Sydney Morning Herald described Hilary as an "extremely uptight" woman.

In Neighbours: The Official Annual 1991, John McCready and Nicola Furlong said that Sharon Davies (Jessica Muschamp) never got any peace and tranquillity when Hilary was around. They also said Scott-Pendlebury had made a mark on Neighbours. The Evening Times said Hilary "is the tactless cousin of The Robinson family who despite all her faults did bring Beverly and Jim together." A writer from Inside Soap branded Hilary Ramsay Street's "strait-laced resident". In 2015, a TV Week columnist praised Hilary's return and wrote "here's to you, Hilary Robinson. Yep, she's back! Older Neighbours fans will get a real kick out of seeing Hilary (Anne Scott-Pendlebury) once more. They'll remember her as the bossy, meddling, do-gooder cousin of Paul Robinson (Stefan Dennis)." A Coventry Evening Telegraph reporter branded Hilary "irritating". Daniel Kilkelly from Digital Spy branded Hilary an "interfering" character. In a 1990 poll ran by Woman magazine, Pendlebury was rated one of the least popular "soap stars". A Herald Sun reporter included Hilary's 2015 return in their "Neighbours' 30 most memorable moments" feature.
