= Shaunna O'Grady =

Australian actress

Shaunna O'Grady (born 1958) is an Australian actress who played the second incarnation of Jim Robinson's wife Dr. Beverly Marshall on the long-running soap opera Neighbours. She is the granddaughter of writer John O'Grady (author of They're a Weird Mob), and is married to the television director Chris Adshead. They have one daughter, Savannah.

In 2019, O'Grady returned to Neighbours as Beverly.
