= Helen Daniels =

Fictional character from the Australian soap opera Neighbours

- Neighbours character
- Portrayed by: Anne Haddy
- Duration: 1985–1997
- First appearance: 18 March 1985
- Last appearance: 17 October 1997
- Created by: Reg Watson
- Introduced by: Reg Watson
In-universe information
- Occupation: Artist; Home James director
- Mother: Gloria Simpson
- Sisters: Laura Dennison; Gwen Simpson
- Husband: Bill Daniels (backstory); Michael Daniels (1991); Reuben White (1995)
- Daughters: Anne Robinson
- Adoptive daughters: Rosemary Daniels
- Grandsons: Paul Robinson; Scott Robinson
- Granddaughters: Julie Martin; Jill Ramsay; Lucy Robinson
- Nieces: Nikki Dennison
- First cousins: Thelma Duncan
- Other relatives: Wayne Duncan; Troy Duncan; Amy Williams; Andrew Robinson; Hannah Martin

Helen Daniels is a fictional character from the Australian soap opera Neighbours, portrayed by Anne Haddy. Helen debuted in the series' first episode as part of the Robinson family, functioning as the family's matriarch and confidante of her son-in-law Jim Robinson (Alan Dale). Helen outlasted her initial on-screen family, and Haddy was the only remaining original cast member from 1993 until the character's death in 1997.

== Creation and casting ==
Helen is one of the twelve original characters conceived by the creator and then executive producer of Neighbours, Reg Watson. Watson invited Haddy to play Helen in a bid to portray a mother-in-law out of conjunction with the battleaxe stereotype. The role required Haddy and her husband James Condon to relocate from Sydney to Melbourne for filming. Haddy admitted that it was a big decision. As the couple were settling into their new home, with Condon also introduced to the cast as Helen's love interest Douglas Blake, Haddy learned Seven Network had cancelled Neighbours. She said "My heart fell to the floor. Jim and I had moved all our furniture from Sydney to Melbourne and the thought of packing up again was too much." The serial was soon picked up by Network Ten. Haddy commented that she was "working like a dog and loving every minute of it." She also liked that she was not treated "like an old crock" on set.

== Development ==
Helen's character outline, detailing her fictional backstory, appeared in James Oram's 1988 book Neighbours: Behind the Scenes:

When her daughter died, Helen's heart went out to Jim and his four children and she took over the running of the house. Helen has been widowed for fifteen years. She is an avid reader with a strong interest in world affairs and politics, and is an accomplished amateur artist. However, the core of her life is the well-being and happiness of the Robinson family.

Haddy thought Helen was similar to herself, saying that she was "very supportive, downright, earthy and very modern in her ideas. She wasn't when she was younger but she's developed that way through her experiences."

Helen is a caring woman, often being portrayed as "a shoulder to cry on" for her friends and family, She has a sympathetic nature and offers motherly advice to anyone who needs it. Helen's storylines have sometimes been tragic, but she always remains the voice of reason and helps those around her.

In the Neighbours twentieth anniversary book she is described as being the serial's matriarch for more than 12 years. Also described as "having a heart of gold" and "not only being the linchpin of the Ramsay Street community, but she opened her heart and home to anyone in need of care and attention."

In 1997, Haddy was forced to quit the serial due to her own ill health. Producer Peter Dodds admitted that the crew were worried about the gap her departure would leave in the show, as she was still a core cast member. He said that Haddy was "fiercely loyal" to Neighbours, but he thought it was not fair for her to stay on while she was so ill. After discussing it with Haddy, producers decided the best thing to do with Helen was kill her off, as it had "good dramatic potential" and gave her a definite end.

== Storylines ==
She married her first husband Bill Daniels at age sixteen and remained married to him for more than thirty years until his death in 1969. Years after she was devastated to find out he had an affair with her best friend Grace Barnett (Marijke Mann). The couple had a biological daughter, Anne, and an adopted daughter, Rosemary (Joy Chambers). Anne married Jim Robinson (Alan Dale) and had three children with him – Paul (Stefan Dennis), Scott (Darius Perkins; Jason Donovan) and Julie (Vikki Blanche; Julie Mullins) – before dying while giving birth to Lucy. After Anne's death, Helen moved into the Robinsons' home at 26 Ramsay Street, to help Jim with the family.

In the show's storyline Helen helped run the Robinson household. During her time in Erinsborough she endured the deaths of her son-in-law Jim, as well as her grandchild Julie. Her other grandchildren gradually departed, and Julie's widower Philip Martin (Ian Rawlings) and his children, Debbie (Marnie Reece-Wilmore) and Hannah Martin (Rebecca Ritters), moved into the Robinson house. During her 12 and a half years on the show, Helen was charged with drink driving, buried a granddaughter, had an affair with her daughter's fiancé, was kidnapped, was evicted, was widowed and had a bout of depression after son in law Jim Robinson died. In the storyline Helen remarried twice, first in 1991 to Michael Daniels (Brian Blain), her first husband's cousin. Michael was soon revealed as a bigamist who was still married to his first wife Louise (Maggie Payne) and so the marriage was annulled. She later married Reuben White (James Condon) in 1995; however, he died soon afterwards.

After becoming increasingly frail and spending a long time in hospital, Helen returned home on her birthday in 1997. After watching a ten-year-old video of Scott and Charlene's wedding, with Philip, Debbie, Hannah and her friends Harold (Ian Smith) and Madge Bishop (Anne Charleston) around her, she fell asleep on the sofa and died. At the end of the episode, Helen became the third character to have her death marked by the sad piano theme tune and tribute stills. However, for the first, and so far only time, there were no actual credits shown, given her exceptionally important and long-standing role in the show. A memorial service was later held at Lassiter's lake where her ashes were laid.

== Reception ==
For her portrayal of Helen, Haddy won the Sustained Performance by an Actress in a Series accolade at the 1987 Penguin Awards. In 1995, Haddy was nominated for Most Popular Actress at the 1st National Television Awards. The following year, Haddy received an Inside Soap Award nomination for Best Single Performance by a Female, as Helen grieved for Reuben. At the two subsequent ceremonies, Haddy won Best Soap Veteran, and Helen was nominated for Most Missed Character.

Anthony Hayward of The Independent described Helen for Anne Haddy's obituary, he stated: "When the serial started, Helen was the widowed mother-in-law of Jim Robinson, and to the Robinson family she was known as "The Rock of Gibraltar". She was the diplomat and voice of reason to whom residents of Ramsay Street, in the fictional Melbourne suburb of Erinsborough, turned for advice." He also branded her "the most glamorous granny on television". Ruth Deller of television website Lowculture gave Helen a 5 out of 5 for her contribution to Neighbours, during a feature called "A guide to recognising your Ramsays and Robinsons". Deller called Helen "The most respected elder of the Robinson clan". She added "Helen was a local artist renowned for her 'interesting' paintings of the locals and her tendency to take in waifs and strays. She also had an unfortunate habit of marrying conmen, bigamists or men who died shortly after their wedding. Helen was always the voice of reason, and when she died (sadly followed closely by Anne Haddy, who played her), the street lost perhaps its most beloved character ever".

In 2010 to celebrate Neighbours' 25th anniversary Sky, a British satellite broadcasting company profiled 25 characters of which they believed were the most memorable in the series history. Helen is in the list and describing her they state: "According to the mid-nineties joke, what will be left at the end of the world? Cockroaches and Helen Daniels. Well, you could guarantee that in such an event, Helen would take in the waifier, strayier cockroaches and rehabilitate them off the path to juvenile centre. Helen was a far gentler matriarch than her British equivalents, dealing with the problems of all the neighbourhood teens, which presumably revolved around waxing for her own grandkids Debbie and Hannah. Her name lives on in her eponymous charity foundation, and as the painter of that dreadful portrait of the Kennedy children in Karl and Susan's front room." Editor of MSN TV, Lorna Cooper branded Helen a 'kindly matriarch' for caring for many of the show's teenagers.

ATV News labeled Helen one of their icons, describing her capacity to love as great, even after all the tragic events she had lived through, subsequently branded her as a shoulder to cry on for all of her neighbours. They also compared her to Meg Richardson, a fellow fictional character from UK serial drama Crossroads, which was also created by Reg Watson, stating they are well-known to be similar and often drew these comparisons during Helen's time in the serial. Josephine Monroe in her book Neighbours: The first 10 Years, describes Helen as being the "linchpin of Neighbours", adding that everyone wanted to be her friend and would turn to her for help and that she is universally loved.

In her book Soap opera, Dorothy Hobson describes Helen as breaking the stereotype for older women stating: "She was a very attractive woman, probably in her sixties, who had a successful career as an artist a number of romances and led a completely independent life, whilst still providing stability within the family."

Helen was placed at number ten on the Huffpost's "35 greatest Neighbours characters of all time" feature. Journalist Adam Beresford believed Helen was so famous that you could "ask any 80s or 90s kid to name their favourite fictional granny, and Helen would top the list." He described Helen as "firm but fair, she was the voice of wisdom, providing a listening ear and a shoulder to cry on." Beresford thought she "brought a touch of class to Erinsborough", viewed her relationship with son-in-law Jim as "refreshing" but concluded that she painted the "worst portraits ever known to man". In a feature profiling the "top 12 iconic Neighbours characters", critic Sheena McGinley of the Irish Independent placed Helen as her twelfth choice. She called Helen the Australian answer to the iconic British soap opera characters Dot Cotton (June Brown) and Edna Birch (Shirley Stelfox). McGinley claimed that Helen will always be "the antithesis to the cretinous Mrs Mangel". She concluded that Helen was the show's "doting, glamorous granny, who always lent an ear to anyone who needed to offload a worry." Sam Strutt of The Guardian compiled a feature counting down the top ten most memorable moments from history of Neighbours. Strutt included Helen's death as the third most memorable, adding "there wasn't a dry eye" in viewers' homes. A Herald Sun reporter included Helen's death in their "Neighbours' 30 most memorable moments" feature.
