= Jim Robinson (Neighbours) =

Australian soap opera character

- Neighbours character
- Portrayed by: Alan Dale
- Duration: 1985–1993, 2018–2019
- First appearance: 18 March 1985
- Last appearance: 25 March 2019
- Created by: Reg Watson
- Introduced by: Reg Watson (1985); Jason Herbison (2018)
- Book appearances: Neighbours: The Robinsons – A Family in Crisis (1989)
In-universe information
- Occupation: Engineer
- Family: Robinson
- Father: James Robinson
- Mother: Bess Robinson
- Wife: Anne Daniels (backstory); Beverly Marshall (1988–1991)
- Sons: Paul Robinson; Glen Donnelly; Scott Robinson
- Daughters: Lucy Robinson
- Adoptive daughters: Julie Martin
- Grandsons: David Tanaka; Leo Tanaka; Cameron Robinson; Robert Robinson; Andrew Robinson; Daniel Robinson
- Granddaughters: Amy Williams; Elle Robinson; Madison Robinson; Hannah Martin; Annie Robinson-Pappas
- Grandfathers: Sam Robinson
- First cousins: Hilary Robinson
- Other relatives: Matt Robinson

Jim Robinson is a fictional character from the Australian soap opera Neighbours, played by Alan Dale. Jim was created by Reg Watson as one of Neighbours' twelve original characters. He made his on-screen debut in the soap's first episode, which was broadcast on 18 March 1985. Jim was the patriarch of the Robinson family. Dale departed the show in 1993 after falling out with the producers and his character was killed off on 29 April 1993. Dale filmed some scenes for the serial in September 2018, which aired on 25 December 2018 and 25 March 2019.

== Creation and casting ==
Jim is one of the twelve original characters conceived by the creator and then executive producer of Neighbours, Reg Watson. Actor Robin Harrison was originally cast in the role and had already filmed some scenes when his contract negotiations broke down. The role was then recast to Alan Dale in January 1985, and the scenes featuring Harrison were re-shot. Dale had been out of regular work since his role in The Young Doctors ended in 1982, and was appearing in a small role in Possession when he was offered the part of Jim by producer John Holmes. The character had intrigued Dale, who thought that parts of Jim's life echoed his own life at the time. He said "It's like it was written for me. It's a great role and naturally it's one I can really relate to. You have to be fairly similar to a character you play, otherwise you'd go insane." Dale chose to relocate from Sydney to Melbourne, where Neighbours is filmed, but commuted between the two cities for some time while he was still appearing on Possession.

== Development ==
=== Backstory and characterisation ===
In his 1988 book Neighbours: Behind the Scenes, James Oram wrote that the role of Jim was vital to Neighbours and described him as an anchor, in the same way Leslie Grantham's role of Den Watts was to British soap opera EastEnders. Jim was introduced as a widowed father of four, who lives in Ramsay Street with his mother-in-law Helen Daniels (Anne Haddy). In his fictional backstory, Helen moved in with Jim after her daughter, Anne, died during childbirth. Helen's husband Bill had also recently died and she was happy to come and help care for her grandchildren: Paul (Stefan Dennis), Julie (Vikki Blanche; Julie Mullins), Scott (Darius Perkins; Jason Donovan) and Lucy (Kylie Flinker; Sasha Close; Melissa Bell).

Jim's original character outline appeared in Oram's book:

Jim Robinson's wife died during the birth of Lucy and since then he has dedicated his life to ensuring that his four children have the best home life he can give them with the help of Helen Daniels. Jim is an understanding and caring father who uses reason in disciplining and educating his children. He has a great sense of fun and enjoys playing with his children. Jim is in partnership in a small engineering works.

When he began filming, Dale admitted that he was trying to get used to his character's large, older brood of children. The children's ages ranged from nine to 21. At the time, Dale's own sons were 14 and 15. He also felt that as he was also a single parent, he could bring some of his own experiences to the role. He stated "There are situations that are very similar to the ones I have had to meet myself. Living in the same situation will help. For example, I am very tactile with my kids – I kiss and cuddle them a lot – and if I hadn't had kids of my own and of that size I wouldn't have known that people really did behave like this." While he shared some similarities with his character, Dale insisted that he was not as steadfast or as patient as Jim.

Josephine Monroe, author of Neighbours: The First 10 Years, stated that Jim was the type of man that other men disliked because he had it all: a nice house, his own business, lovely children and a way with women. Monroe observed that Anne's death had caused Jim's personality to change and there was always a "reserved sadness about him". He was also perceived as being "stuffy and proper". Soap Box author Hilary Kingsley described him as being "reasonable, accessible, quiet and calm." He never argued with Helen and was polite to her friends. Jim was also reliable and understanding, particularly when it came to his children, who he was devoted to.

=== Relationships ===
Despite his reputation with women, Jim did not have that many romantic relationships during his time in the show, which Dale complained about, as he thought Jim's celibacy was unrealistic. The character's first romance occurred shortly after Neighbours began airing, as Maria Ramsay's (Dasha Bláhová) sister Anna Rossi (Roslyn Gentle) is introduced. Amanda Zachariah of TV Week noted that "falling in love at first sight" would not be a characteristic associated with Jim, who was known for being the show's "solid and stable widower". But Dale told her that is exactly what happens, explaining: "Jim meets Anna on the patio of his neighbor's [sic] house and wham, that's it for him. Anna has come down from Queensland to help her sister in a crisis, and as far as Jim is concerned it is love." Dale also pointed out that Jim had been a widower for nine years and devoted his life to raising his children. So when he starts dating Anna, he has new priorities and the children are not sure how to react. Anna eventually ends the relationship because she does not want to cause a feud between his family and the Ramsays.

Jim's next romance is with Zoe Davis (Ally Fowler), which shocks the neighbourhood because she is twenty years his junior. Dale did not think there was anything wrong with an older man dating a younger woman. The relationship does not sit well with the Robinsons and Lucy is especially unhappy about it. However, Jim and Zoe continue to date and are shocked when Zoe becomes pregnant. Jim is reluctant to become a father again in mid-forties and he and Zoe grow distant, as she wants to keep the baby. Jim later proposes to Zoe, but when she suffers an ectopic pregnancy, they break up.

Later that year, Jim meets Englishwoman Ruth Wilson (Stephanie Daniel) on a plane, while he is returning home from the United States. The couple "got on like a house on fire." Ruth checks into Lassiter's Hotel, which is run by Paul. However, when Ruth is unable to pay the bill, Jim steps in and pays it for her. He then invites her to stay with his family for the duration of her visit to Australia.

Producers developed a more prominent relationship between Jim and Beverly Marshall (Lisa Armytage). Dale told Amanda Zachary from TV Week that Jim was so taken with Beverly because he originally had competition for her affections when they first met. Writers soon married the pair but they did not have a traditional wedding. Dale described it as a quiet "family affair" which is conducted at home. Dale was "shocked" when producers informed him that Jim and Beverly would marry. Dale believed it marked a change in Jim's character, after three years of being portrayed as the working single parent. Dale added that "all of sudden he's a married man and his life is turned upside down." Jim's marriage also allowed writers to further explore Jim's characterisation; Dale told Zachary that "Jim has developed a lot more basic warmth and affection." He concluded that building a good rapport with Armytage allowed him to adjust to the married version of Jim.

=== Departure ===
Dale stayed for eight years before Jim was killed off in April 1993. In subsequent years Dale described his departure from Neighbours as acrimonious, characterising the producers as "greedy and nasty", and stating that his working relationship with the production was damaged by his willingness to "fight". In an interview with the Metro newspaper, Dale described the pay the cast received as not reflecting the international success of the series. He called his time working for Grundy "the worst experience", adding "they practically forced us to be miserable. It paid me enough to get my boys through their teenage years, but I wasn't happy and we parted on bad terms." Dale also said that the Neighbours producers "stitched" him up on his last day of filming. Jim died of a heart attack and Dale said "they left me lying on the floor all day. They enjoyed themselves". Dale struggled to find work in Australia after Neighbours because he was typecast as Jim.

=== Return ===
In September 2018, Dale confirmed that he was filming for Neighbours in a studio in Atlanta. He did not specify what the scenes were or whether it was for the main show or an online webisode. Jess Lee of Digital Spy speculated that Jim may appear as a ghost or an apparition to a family member. Dale had previously paid a visit to the Neighbours set in April 2018, where he was reunited with Dennis (Paul Robinson). Inside Soap later confirmed that Jim would appear in the main show, and he made his appearance as "a dream or ghostly flashback sequence" on 25 December. Of his return, Dale stated that it had "laid a load of ghosts to rest for me", adding "How can I be back? I wouldn't want to spoil the surprise so I'm not going to say much except I was thrilled to be there! I am working with my dear old friend Stefan. It's fun, I hope everyone's going to enjoy it." Further scenes featuring Jim appearing to Paul in a dream aired on 25 March 2019.

== Storylines ==
Jim is a widower, who lives with his four children and mother-in-law Helen Daniels at Number 26 Ramsay Street. His wife had died in 1975 when giving birth to their youngest child.

Jim has a brief relationship with Anna Rossi, before he begins a relationship with Zoe Davis, who is twenty years his junior. Both Paul and Lucy disapprove of the relationship. Zoe becomes pregnant, but she miscarries and later leaves Erinsborough. Jim then dates Ruth Wilson (Stephanie Daniel) and she is welcomed into the family, before she leaves for London. Jim's daughter Julie later leaves to marry Philip Martin (Christopher Milne; Ian Rawlings). Jim comes into conflict with his youngest son, Scott, when he announces that he is going to marry Charlene Mitchell (Kylie Minogue). Jim eventually gives the couple his blessing. Jim has a love for cars and he buys an old motor racing car. He later buys fifty percent of Rob Lewis' (Ernie Bourne) garage, and after Rob's death, Jim buys the rest of the business. His cousin, Hilary Robinson (Anne Scott-Pendlebury) introduces him to Beverly and they later marry.

Beverly's niece and nephew, Katie (Sally Jensen) and Todd Landers (Kristian Schmid) come to stay and Todd becomes like a son to Jim. Beverly wants children despite Jim's reluctance. After two miscarriages and a failed adoption, the couple separate and Beverly leaves. However, Beverly’s nephew Todd stays with Jim, and he is devastated in July 1992 when Todd dies after being hit by a car.

Jim is shocked when Glen Donnelly (Richard Huggett) turns up and reveals he is Jim's son. Jim had a brief relationship with Glen's mother during the Vietnam War. Jim welcomes Glen into the family. Todd dies after being knocked down by a van, devastating Jim. Jim is happy when Philip and Julie return to Erinsborough with their two children and move in to Number 26 with him and Helen. He has a massive heart attack following a bike race and needs bypass surgery. Pam Willis (Sue Jones), a nurse at Erinsborough Hospital, helps Jim recover and they begin to develop feelings for each other, but she later reunites with her husband, Doug Willis (Terence Donovan).

Annalise Hartman's (Kimberley Davies) mother, Fiona (Suzanne Dudley), sets her sights on Jim knowing he is wealthy and Jim ignores the warnings from his family that Fiona is a gold digger. Helen and Julie try to warn Jim that Fiona is only after his money, but Jim refuses to listen. Helen refuses to watch Jim make a fool of himself and moves out of their home to live with Julie and Philip. The stress of all the feuding takes its toll on Jim and after playing in the garden with granddaughter Hannah Martin (Rebecca Ritters) he suffers another heart attack. He collapses on the kitchen floor and dies. Although she initially phones for an ambulance, Fiona hangs up and instead rings Jim's accountant, seizing the opportunity to transfer his money to her account and lets his sister-in-law Rosemary Daniels (Joy Chambers) discover his body, while Fiona pretends to be shocked. Julie and Fiona fight over Jim's death whilst Helen collapses from the shock. Fiona later confesses her scam to Annalise and flees town whilst the remainder of Jim's property is divided between his children and Helen keeps the house.

Twenty-five years later, after Paul crashes his car on Christmas Day, he regains consciousness and sees a vision of Jim in a Christmas bauble hanging from the mirror. Jim talks to Paul about his various mistakes, including his many failed marriages, broken relationships with his children and his criminal history. Jim tells Paul that it is not too late for him to be the man he wants to be. Paul later sees Jim walking away from him. Months later, still haunted with guilt from not living up to his father's legacy, Paul has another dream about Jim, who expresses his disappointment in Paul's tribute to him, the Robinson Pines housing development, which has been embroiled in a scandal. He tells Paul that he is only thinking of money, and making the same mistakes over and over again.

== Reception ==
The Age's John Westwood branded Jim "the steady father figure of Ramsay Street". Westwood also thought the character was "beleaguered" and observed: "Jim always seems a bit knackered, and small wonder, because if he is not taking philosophical stick from his serious son Paul, little daughter Lucy is pelting him with cheek about his love life." While reviewing early episodes of the serial, Terry Kelleher of Newsday found the character to be "an easygoing widower whose biggest problem last week was starting his balky lawnmower."

In 2007, Amazon.co.uk reported that they had sold more DVDs of films and television shows featuring Dale than any featuring other ex-Neighbours cast members. Dale has sold over twice as much as Kylie Minogue (Charlene Robinson). The Times named Jim's death as one of their top 15 most memorable Neighbours moments and The Independent named his death as one of the 10 best soap exits.

During a review of Neighbours' 20th anniversary episode, television critic Charlie Brooker expressed his disappointment that Jim did not make an appearance, he said "It's a shame they didn't go the whole hog and include updates from those characters who left Erinsborough in a coffin. I'd have loved to see, say, Jim Robinson bellowing a few lines from heaven (never spoke without shouting, that man)".

In 2010 to celebrate Neighbours' 25th anniversary, BSkyB, a British satellite broadcasting company, profiled 25 characters of which they believed were the most memorable in the series history. Jim is in the list and describing him they state: "Jim lives on in the collective memory thanks to people declaring whenever Alan Dale is on TV, 'look, Jim Robinson is on Torchwood/24/Ugly Betty, LOL.' Push them harder, and they'll probably just about remember Jim dying of a heart attack in the chintz-tastic Robinson home in 1993. Such is the fate of a family man who didn't really have memorable storylines outside of his four walls, but he did bequeath a set of Soapland's finest, most gently mental children, including villainous 'business' man Paul, occasional stripper Lucy, technically-not-his-daughter Julie, and technically-not-his-monobrow Todd Landers".

In her book Soap Opera, author Dorothy Hobson described Jim as breaking the stereotype of the time because Jim owned a successful business and branded him a "successful role model for a single father running a home." In 2013, Rachael Misstear from the Western Mail included Jim's death in her list of the "10 tear-jerking soap opera exits". She commented "Sad mainly because it marked the end of an era, Neighbours veteran and patriarch Jim Robinson suffered a fatal heart attack and collapsed in very dramatic fashion on the kitchen floor." Janelle was placed at number nineteen on the Huffpost's "35 greatest Neighbours characters of all time" feature. Journalist Adam Beresford described him as the Robinson family patriarch and "generally a calm and reasonable figure" within the show. He also assessed that Jim "provided an anchor" in the show during the cast arrivals and departures of the show's first decade. Beresford called Jim's most memorable moment as his "unintentionally hilarious death scene", and added that Neighbours continued the hilarity of his demise via Jim's reappearance on a Christmas bauble years later.

Donna Hay from What's on TV included Jim and Zoe in a list of soap opera "odd couples". Hay assessed that the affair "was doomed from the outset. She was committed to saving the world's wildlife; he thought the best place for an animal was on the barbecue." Hay also included Jim and Beverly in a feature focusing on soap "marriages made in hell". Hay noted that Jim should have known his marriage "would be short-lived" because Beverly refused to change her name. Hay added that Jim wanted "a proper wife", but Beverly was more interested in performing live saving operations.
