= Guy Carpenter (Neighbours) =

- Neighbours character
- Portrayed by: Andrew Williams
- Duration: 1991–1992, 2015
- First appearance: 10 September 1991
- Last appearance: 18 March 2015
- Introduced by: Don Battye (1991); Jason Herbison (2015)
In-universe information
- Occupation: Waiter; Recreation officer; Swimming instructor
- Father: Lou Carpenter
- Mother: Kathy Carpenter
- Sisters: Lauren Carpenter
- Half-sisters: Ling Mai Chan
- Aunts: Brenda Riley
- Nephews: Mason Turner; Bailey Turner
- Nieces: Paige Smith; Amber Turner

Guy Carpenter is a fictional character from the Australian soap opera Neighbours, played by Andrew Williams. The actor was initially hesitant about joining the show, as he had been about to secure a record contract. He made his first appearance during the episode broadcast on 10 September 1991. A few months later, Williams decided to leave Neighbours as he felt unfulfilled by the role. He also wanted more time to pursue his music career. Guy departed on 27 March 1992. Williams reprised his role for one episode as part of the show's 30th anniversary on 18 March 2015.

Guy was portrayed as a handsome, sporty, ladies' man. Williams said there were aspects of Guy's personality he could relate to, especially their search for "Miss Right". Upon his introduction, Guy was estranged from his father, Lou (Tom Oliver). When Lou returned to Erinsborough, he and Guy made their peace with each other. During his time in the show, Guy took steroids, tried dating three women at once and had a brief romance with Gaby Willis (Rachel Blakely). Television critics branded the character a "heart throb" and "a charming rogue".

== Casting ==
Guy was one of three "young and spunky" characters created as part of a large revamp of the show, which had seen a large decline in ratings and eight other characters written out. Also joining the cast was Rachel Blakely and Scott Michaelson as siblings Gaby Willis and Brad Willis. Producers hoped the new characters would attract younger viewers to the soap. Musician and former model Andrew Williams won the role of Guy. He decided to join the cast of Neighbours after failing to secure a record contract. He almost rejected the role, explaining: "I was still in music mode and I thought Kylie, Jason, Craig... not me, no way". In December 1991, producer Don Battye thought the new cast additions, including Williams had been "enormously successful" for the show, and that he and Lorraine Bayly had strengthened the cast.

== Development ==
Guy was given a connection to established character Lou Carpenter (Tom Oliver), who was revealed to be his father. The pair were estranged following Lou's divorce from Guy's mother, Kathy Carpenter (Tina Bursill). Guy was introduced as Erinsborough's recreational officer. He arrived alongside his aunt Brenda Riley, played by Genevieve Lemon. The pair co-manage the local coffee shop and have fun romancing their neighbours. Josephine Monroe, author of Neighbours: The First Ten Years, said Guy's "good looks and way with the cappuccino machine in the Coffee Shop set his female customers' heart aflutter." The BBC's official Neighbours website described Guy as being "a ladies man" much like his father. They also thought that Guy took steroids to win a race, due to the "competitive nature" of his relationship with his father, who often expected too much from him. Williams said there were parts of Guy that he could relate to, especially their sporty sides and that they were both looking for "Miss Right".

Ahead of the character's arrival on UK screens, the Bristol Evening Post's television critic Tim described the character as a "womaniser", while Ian Brandes of the Sunday Mirror said he would set his sights on Gaby Willis. Reinforcing his ladies man reputation, Guy tries dating Gaby, Lucy Robinson (Melissa Bell) and Caroline Alessi (Gillian Blakeney) at the same time, however, they soon find out what he is doing. He later becomes close to Gaby and they have a brief romance. Discussing Guy and Gaby's first kiss, Williams told a reporter from BIG! magazine that "there was nothing in it really – it was just a screen kiss. I knew her real-life husband very well so it was just like kissing a friend's wife." Following an argument with her boyfriend Glen Donnelly (Richard Huggett), Gaby runs off with Guy. However, she is not serious about him and she later returns to Glen when he proposes to her. Guy is "very hurt" when he learns the news, as he cared a lot for Gaby and wanted her to tell him. Guy is reunited with his father when Lou returns to town, and the two make their peace with each other.

A few months after joining Neighbours, Williams decided to leave. He said the show was not what he was after and wanted to continue pursuing a career in music, which he found he did not have time to do during his time on Neighbours. He added, "I guess I felt a little bit unfulfilled for that." His departure was publicised in March 1992, as Mack McGowan of TV Week confirmed that he would be leaving the serial at the end of the month. His exit came amidst a "cast shake-up" that saw four actors leave the show. Williams later said that Neighbours was "a great learning opportunity" for him, but his character did not seem to be going anywhere. In March 1996, Inside Soap's Jason Herbison reported that Channel 10 were so keen on keeping actor Vince Poletto on the network, that they were considering casting him as Guy, as Williams was unlikely to return to the serial.

On 28 November 2014, it was announced that Williams had reprised his role for the show's 30th anniversary in March 2015. Guy returns for his niece, Amber Turner's (Jenna Rosenow) wedding day. He arrives at the Turner house ahead of the ceremony and is reunited with his family, including his sister Lauren (Kate Kendall) and his father Lou.

== Storylines ==
Guy comes to Erinsborough to stay with his aunt, Brenda. However, Brenda tells Guy that he cannot stay with her as the house she is leasing belongs to Harold Bishop (Ian Smith), who does not like Lou and may not want his son staying there. Guy spends a night sleeping on the floor of the Coffee Shop, and after Harold leaves town, Guy moves in with Brenda. Guy begins working at the Coffee Shop, where he flirts with the female customers. Guy arranges dates with Gaby Willis, Lucy Robinson and Caroline Alessi at the same time, but he is soon caught out and forced to apologise to them. Guy befriends Brad Willis (Scott Michaelson) and they train for a cross-country run together. Brad discovers Guy is taking steroids and tries to talk him out of taking them, but Guy tells him to mind his own business. Brad asks his mother, Pam (Sue Jones), a nurse, for advice and she tells Brenda, who confronts Guy. When she threatens to take some of the steroids herself, Guy agrees to give them up. He ends up winning the cross-country run.

When Brad's surfboards are stolen, Guy comes under suspicion when his half-coin pendant is found nearby. Gaby confronts Guy, but he assures her he did not take the surfboards. He also explains that the pendant was given to him by a woman he had gone on a date with. She had kept hold of the other half and Brad realises she was involved in the robbery. Guy later recognises the woman as Paige Sneddon (Tracy Callander), Brad's boss and girlfriend. Guy struggles to tell Brad and tries asking Paige out on a date in a bid to get the truth about the robbery out of her. Brad catches Guy and accuses him of trying to steal his girlfriend. Gaby shows an interest in Guy again, but he realises she is only using him to get back at her ex-boyfriend, Glen. However, Guy ends up asking Gaby to dinner and develops strong feelings for her. Glen proposes to Gaby and she accepts, and Guy finds out the news from Pam and is upset that Gaby did not tell him herself.

Guy starts working at the local swimming pool as a recreation officer, but soon clashes with his boss, Sid Butcher (Timothy Bell). After a confrontation with Sid, Guy quits his job. Brenda intervenes and tells Sid that Guy was upset about the death of his dog. Sid offers Guy his job back. Lou arrives in town and he and Guy try to repair their relationship. Lou initially avoids talking about their issues and only shows interest in Guy's sporting achievements. But they manage to sort things out and Lou tells Guy that he loves him. Guy gets a job as a swimming instructor in Broome and he leaves Erinsborough.

Twenty-three years later, Guy returns to Erinsborough for his niece, Amber's wedding. He heads to Number 32 to see his family and he meets his eldest niece Paige Smith (Olympia Valance) for the first time. Guy is also reunited with Brad (now Kip Gamblin). After the wedding is cancelled, he returns home. Lou later learns Guy has moved to Queensland to be closer to Kathy.

== Reception ==
A writer from the BBC said that Guy's most memorable moment was dating three women at the same time. Ian Brandes of the Sunday Mirror called the character "a randy Ramsay Street Romeo". Lisa Anthony from BIG! branded Guy a "heart throb". Coral O'Connor of the Daily Mirror agreed with Anthony, and said that while Michaelson was set to be the show's new pin-up, he "faces competition from handsome Andrew Williams". Alex Cramb from Inside Soap called the character "Neighbours' nice guy". TV Week's Elisabeth di Giovanni observed that Guy was a smooth-talker and "a charming rogue". Ahead of Guy's return in 2015, an Inside Soap columnist commented "It's about time Guy Carpenter visited dad Lou and sister Lauren!" A Herald Sun reporter included Guy's 2015 return in their "Neighbours' 30 most memorable moments" feature.
