= Glen Donnelly =

Fictional character from the Australian soap opera Neighbours

- Neighbours character
- Glen in 1991
- Portrayed by: Richard Huggett
- Duration: 1990–1992, 2021–2022
- First appearance: 7 December 1990
- Last appearance: 28 July 2022
- Introduced by: Don Battye (1990); Jason Herbison (2021)
In-universe information
- Occupation: Barman; Builder
- Family: Robinson
- Father: Jim Robinson
- Mother: Maureen Donnelly
- Half-brothers: Paul Robinson; Scott Robinson
- Half-sisters: Julie Martin (adoptive); Lucy Robinson
- Wife: Karen Constintine (separated)
- Daughters: Kiri Durant
- Stepdaughters: Rose Constintine
- Nephews: Andrew Robinson; David Tanaka; Leo Tanaka; Cameron Robinson; Robert Robinson; Daniel Robinson
- Nieces: Annie Robinson-Pappas; Elle Robinson; Amy Williams; Madison Robinson
- Other relatives: Matt Robinson; Harlow Robinson

Glen Donnelly is a fictional character from the Australian soap opera Neighbours, played by Richard Huggett. The actor joined the cast shortly after leaving E Street, and he relocated from Sydney to Melbourne, where the show is filmed. He made his first appearance during the episode broadcast on 7 December 1990. Glen was introduced as the secret son of series regular Jim Robinson (Alan Dale). He came to Erinsborough to meet his father and to ask for money to pay for his mother's funeral.

The character was portrayed as being independent, mature and strong. One of Glen's most notable storylines featured an inappropriate relationship between him and his half-sister, Lucy Robinson (Melissa Bell). Scenes between them were edited out by the BBC upon their UK airing. Glen also had a romance with Gaby Willis (Rachel Blakely). Huggett decided not to renew his contract and Glen departed on 6 February 1992, following an accident which left him paralysed. Huggett reprised the role in November 2021, appearing until 28 July 2022 during the serial's finale.

== Creation and casting ==
In 1990, Neighbours faced "ratings wars" with fellow soap operas in both Britain and Australia, leading to producers scrapping the serial's "goody-goody" image and introducing more sex and scandal in a bid to increase ratings over Coronation Street and Home and Away. The change in storyline direction was prompted by Shaunna O'Grady's decision to quit her role as Beverly Marshall. The character of Glen was soon introduced as Jim Robinson's (Alan Dale) long-lost, illegitimate son. The news causes "embarrassment" for Jim and problems for Glen, who develops an attraction to his half-sister. Glen and Huggett's casting were detailed in the 29 December 1990 edition of TV Week. A writer revealed that Jim would not welcome Glen "with open arms", but added he was to be a "permanent fixture around Ramsay Street."

Richard Huggett was cast as Glen. He joined Neighbours shortly after leaving his role as Sonny Bennett in E Street. On his arrival, Huggett said Glen was "very different" from Sonny. Huggett was forced to relocate from Sydney to Melbourne for the role and he revealed it affected his personal life.

== Development ==
=== Characterisation ===
Glen has been described as "independent, tough and mature beyond his twenty years". He is used to fighting his own battles. When his mother died of cancer, Glen was "full of grief for his mother and resentment for Jim". When Glen arrives in Ramsay Street, he assumes that Jim does not want to know him and he comes in a "fight-picking mood". Jim eventually persuades Glen that he knew nothing about him. Glen and Jim's oldest son, Paul Robinson (Stefan Dennis), do not get on and Glen resents the fact the only jobs he can get mean Paul would be his boss. In 2021, ahead of his return scenes airing, Huggett said Glen was "a troubled young man", but he had grown up and was "a lot calmer now. He doesn't bite quite as easily anymore." He added that there would be a confrontation with Paul.

=== Incestuous relationship ===
One of the character's more notable storylines was an incestuous relationship with his half-sister Lucy Robinson (Melissa Bell). This was Neighbours' first incest storyline. The plot was created as part of a revamp of the show, which saw storylines become more "hard-edged", following a decline in ratings. Neither Lucy or Glen were aware that they were related after he arrived in Ramsay Street and before she returned home from boarding school. When Glen and Lucy meet they are "unable to deny the attraction between them". Glen and Lucy kiss and they are discovered in a compromising situation that angers their father, Jim. Of the storyline Huggett said "The story of Glen's and Lucy's growing feelings for one another might seem pretty audacious, but I think it works because it has been handled sensitively. It was a great acting challenge." He added that incest was a brave subject for Neighbours, a family show, to tackle and that he was surprised about the reaction it caused. Viewers in Australia called Network Ten to complain about the storyline, which was branded a "scandal" and "one of television soaps' most daring encounters". Three episodes featuring the incest scenes between Glen and Lucy were dropped by the BBC when they were due to be aired in the UK. Tony Pratt of the Daily Mirror noted that the pair "were becoming a mite too friendly for the Beeb's liking". The episodes were later shown uncut in repeats on UK Gold.

=== Other relationships ===
The character was part of the show's first "shotgun wedding" plot in 1991. Actress Fiona Jarvis was introduced as Karen Constintine, a woman Glen had had a one-night stand with prior to his arrival in Erinsborough. Karen informs Glen that she is six months pregnant with his child, so he feels that he has to "do the right thing" and proposes marriage. Chrissie Camp of TV Week observed that Glen's decision "has been the talking point of Ramsay Street for weeks." The couple opt to be married at a registry office, with Jim and Harold Bishop (Ian Smith) as witnesses. However, as the celebrant talks about love and honesty, Karen grows "decidedly uncomfortable". Jarvis hoped viewers would sympathise with her character, as she reveals a secret. She explained, "Karen is hiding something, but basically she is a good person. She doesn't mean to hurt anybody." Jarvis said that she enjoyed working with Huggett on the storyline, and admitted that she accepted the part of Karen when her agent told her he was a good actor.

Producers established a romantic relationship between Glen and Gaby Willis (Rachel Blakely) in late 1991. Glen proves to be a big support when Gaby opens her own fashion boutique. He encourages her to capitalise on a client with a famous name and they begin dating. Blakeley admitted to being nervous about Glen and Gaby's first kissing scene, but she called Huggett a "perfect gentleman" and found the scene went well in the end. Huggett said that the love scenes were all choreographed and it was hard to get carried away with ten people standing around watching. Blakeley also said that while Glen and Gabby were in "the early stages" of romance, she did not think their relationship would get too far. A writer for Inside Soap said the couple had Ramsay Street's biggest on-off romance since Scott (Jason Donovan) and Charlene (Kylie Minogue). Following an argument, Gaby runs off with Guy Carpenter (Andrew Williams), but Huggett revealed that she is not serious about Guy and she soon returns to Glen, who proposes. Gaby accepts, making it Glen's second engagement, with the first being to Karen. The characters do not end up marrying, and Huggett said "I don't want to give the game away, but it's pretty dramatic stuff, and it all ends in tears."

=== Departure ===
In September 1991, Chrissie Camp of TV Week reported that Huggett had decided to quit the role. The actor's one-year contract ended in November and he chose not to renew it. Huggett wanted to pursue more "demanding" roles, and stated "I was always pretty adamant that one year is enough to be in one TV series. The thing that has changed in me is that I want to do material which means something to me, stuff with a harder edge. I suppose quality is what I mean – not pumping it out like a sausage factory."

The character's exit storyline began playing out in the last episode of the 1991 season, as he falls from the roof of a building site. In the opening episode of 1992, Glen is taken to the hospital with his neck in a brace. When he wakes up, he learns he is paralysed from the waist down. The plot also deals with the effects of the accident on his family and friends, particularly his fiancée Gaby. In order to prepare for the storyline, Huggett visited the spinal injuries unit at the Austin Hospital and spoke with paraplegics. Huggett also spoke with doctors and nurses to gain insight into the psychological effects on patients, which also includes guilt at becoming a burden on their families. Huggett found the visit to be depressing and sad.

On-screen, Glen decides to call off his wedding to Gaby. Huggett explained "Glen thinks Gaby will waste her life on him and he doesn't want that so, although he's in love with her, he tells her he doesn't love her and wants her to go." Gaby does not believe Glen, but he is insistent. Over the following weeks, Glen tries to come to terms with accident and his paralysis. Glen then decides to leave Erinsborough for good. Huggett was happy to leave the show as part of a dramatic story. His last scenes aired on 8 February 1992. After his exit from Neighbours, Huggett told a writer for Inside Soap that working in soap operas was good training, but he would not go back to them.

=== Reintroduction ===
On 14 August 2021, Joe Julians of Radio Times confirmed that Huggett had reprised the role and would be returning to the serial, alongside Melissa Bell who plays Lucy Robinson. Huggett told Julians that 2021 marked 30 years since he stopped filming with the show. He explained "I did it for a year and it's just like being back home, actually! For one it really doesn't seem like 30 years, maybe it feels like 10 at most, but we've definitely all aged about 30 years. The studios have changed a bit and I get lost going from place to place in there but it really is like being back home. Stefan Dennis who plays Paul is there and Lucinda Cowden who plays Melanie is back now too and catching up with her feels like I just saw her yesterday. Same too with Melissa Bell, she's a real sweetheart and she's hilarious. It's just been really good." Huggett said Neighbours felt like a different show and noted the filming techniques had changed since his days on set, but he was settling in well and had picked up where he left off.

Huggett told Julians that Glen initially returns to Erinsborough to reconnect with Lucy. He then explained that Glen encounters Paul, and as they "were not on the best of terms" when Glen left, there would be "all sorts of twists and turns and cliffhangers – but no hanging off of hotel roofs this time." When asked if the brothers would form a better bond this time around, Huggett said their relationship is more complicated than just pure dislike due to their history and how Paul treated Glen. He also said Glen and Lucy's relationship is "a brotherly sisterly one", and referencing the incest plot, commented that there would be nothing controversial between them. When the character departed in 1992, he was a paraplegic and used a wheelchair. Huggett admitted that his first question was whether Glen was still a paraplegic, but he was pleased with the explanation and justification by the scriptwriters for why he no longer needs the wheelchair. Huggett added that the audience would learn why Glen left Erinsborough back in 1992.

Further details about Glen's return were revealed shortly ahead of the scenes airing in November. Glen comes to the aid of a drunk and disorientated Terese Willis (Rebekah Elmaloglou), who is in Queensland with Paul for a conference. Huggett said Glen is genuine when he offers his help, saying "It's concerning for a woman to be alone and drunk on the beach. I think anyone with an ounce of integrity would help someone in trouble. Glen felt sorry for her and, with the best intentions, wanted to get her back to the safety of the hotel room." Glen initially assumes Terese is Paul's colleague, but later learns they are married. Meanwhile Terese is unhappy to learn that Glen is related to Paul, who she is currently separated from. Paul later spots Glen from a distance, before they reunite and confront one another. Huggett was added to the serial's opening titles in late January 2022.

=== Secret daughter ===
In March 2022, producers introduced Glen's long-lost daughter, Kiri Durant (Gemma Bird Matheson). Huggett said in an interview, "Gemma is great to work with. She's a lot of fun and she's an amazingly talented actress. She's also a writer and a producer, so she does it all." Glen sees Kiri during a trip to the River Bend retreat. He later confides in Terese that he has decided to keep his identity a secret, as he does not want to hurt Kiri, although he does want to connect with her. Glen later reveals to Terese that he had an affair with married woman Barbara Durant (Wendy Mocke), who raised Kiri in belief that her stepfather, Alan, is her biological father. When Barbara arrives in town, Glen is "desperate to avoid Barbara at all costs!" Speaking of Barbara arriving with Kiri, Huggett explained, "The whole time she's in Erinsborough he's hiding, because he can't be in the same room as her. Ultimately, I think Glen told Barbara that he would never contact Kiri – but now here they all are." Nicolette Stone (Charlotte Chimes) soon becomes suspicious of Glen's attachment to Kiri, so teams up with Paul to investigate Glen. Huggett revealed, "Nicolette's on the front foot and basically starts investigating him. At first, Nicolette thought Glen was a creep and had a thing for Kiri. He lied his way out of that, but she won't give up. Even I'm concerned about Glen with Nicolette on the case, she's really good! So Glen is left very worried!"

The truth is exposed after Glen's private investigator, John Wong (Harry Tseng), tells Paul, who in return tells Kiri in front of Glen. Of Paul's actions, Huggett told Susannah Alexander of Digital Spy, "Glen would like to kill Paul if he could! For Glen, that's it – that's the end of their relationship as brothers. I don't think there's anything Paul could do to fix it now. In Glen's eyes, it's over. I don't think he can forgive him for this one." Huggett continued on Kiri's reaction, "She's just in complete shock and she wants nothing to do with Glen. Kiri is stunned that she has been lied to by her mother for her whole life – and that her father Alan never knew. I think there is a chance that Glen and Kiri can start getting along again. There will be, but it'll just take time to move on and for Kiri to accept Glen. I don't think she'll want a father as such, because she's already got one, but she'll want a friend instead. Glen definitely wanted to tell Kiri the truth before now, but he just knew the impact it would have. I don't think he ever would have told her if Paul hadn't got involved." Additionally, Huggett voiced that early parts of the storyline were "really odd to play", but said that he had enjoyed filming them.

=== Character reflection ===
It was announced that Neighbours would be airing its final episode on 28 July 2022. Huggett explained of the final days of filming, "The atmosphere on set has been quite sad. People are happy-sad! It's surreal and everyone has a different journey that they're taking, and a different story they have to tell over how they feel about it." Huggett called the finale "beautifully written, very poignant and very celebratory" and explained that he was glad the show was given time to conclude storylines, however said that no storylines for Glen had been changed and ended as the way they were originally planned. Reflecting on his character's storylines, Huggett said, "I think everything has played out as planned, as far as I know. We've had the Kiri story, the Terese story, and the vineyard story with the accident. It's all coming together and resolving, so I think it's played out the way they planned it. I don't think anything has changed with the way it's going." He also believed of Glen and Terese's relationship, "I think Glen needs Terese more than she needs him. She still has a connection to Paul and that has worried Glen a lot. I think he's a bit too needy for her."

The actor explained that his favourite storyline was his reintroduction and his first scene with Stefan Dennis since 1992, saying, "My favourite storyline would be when Glen first came back this time and surprised Paul. The scene that we shot where Paul was looking out to sea and Glen came up behind him and said: 'It's been a long time'. That's one of my favourite scenes to have shot." Huggett also said that he enjoyed the River Bend Getaway storyline and said he had fun collaborating with Dennis, Rebekah Elmaloglou and Tim Kano. He also said that if the serial had not been cancelled, he would have "definitely" stayed part of the cast after his initial one year contract expired. When asked if he wanted a happy ending for Glen, Huggett responded, "Yeah definitely, because Glen had a sad ending the last time when he fell off the roof! It was similar when the barrel fell on him at the vineyard. I thought: 'Oh no, not again!' It was really important that he has a happy resolve - some sort of resolution." He also noted that the storyliners, writers and producers "had full control over" Glen for the final months.

== Storylines ==
Glen turns up in Ramsay Street to see Jim and he reveals that he is his son. He also explains that his mother Maureen Donnelly, with whom Jim had an affair, has died of cancer. Jim is shocked and Glen realises that Jim had never been aware he existed. Jim wants to get to know Glen better and invites him to move in. Glen finds it difficult to fit in at first. Helen Daniels (Anne Haddy), Jim's mother-in-law, is shocked to learn about Jim's affair, but she gradually begins to look on Glen as part of the family. Julie (Julie Mullins) and Scott accept Glen, but Paul refuses to and he and Glen fail to get on. Lucy is away at boarding school and she returns home before Jim tells her the truth about Glen. Lucy is attracted to Glen after she arrives home and finds him wearing nothing, but a bath towel. Glen is also attracted to Lucy, but he knows that she is his half-sister and he refuses to let anything happen. Jim tells Lucy about Glen, but they still end up kissing. Both of them realise what they are doing is wrong and stop things before they develop any further.

Glen get a job as a barman at The Waterhole pub but prefers working outdoors and he becomes a labourer with Doug Willis' (Terence Donovan) construction firm. Glen has a brief romance with Gemma Ramsay (Beth Buchanan). Karen Constintine, Glen's ex-girlfriend shows up in Erinsborough and reveals that she is pregnant with his child. Glen is shocked, but resolves to do the right thing and he and Karen become engaged. During their wedding, Karen confesses that Glen is not the father of her baby and leaves.

Glen then began dating Gaby Willis after she comforted him on the anniversary of his mother's death. After a brief split, Glen proposes to Gaby who accepts. On Christmas Day, Glen and Todd Landers (Kristian Schmid) are called to Lassiter's Hotel to fix a banner. Glen loses his footing and Todd grabs him but is unable to hold on and Glen falls. Glen is left paralysed from the waist down, which devastates him. Feeling like he is a burden, Glen begins to reject Gaby's support and ends the engagement.

Paul begins acting differently towards Glen and Glen realises that Paul is terrified he is going to be sued. Glen initially wants nothing from Paul other than his medical expenses paid for. However, when Paul attempts to get Glen to sign a document waiving his rights to sue his company, Glen decides to sue Paul for a large amount of money and finds himself alienated by his family. Karen returns, with her daughter, Rose (Alisen Merrey) when she hears of Glen's accident. Glen turns to her for support and falls in love with her again. Glen secretly agrees to take an out-of-court settlement from Paul and he flees Erinsborough with Karen. Jim and Gaby search for Glen, but they never find him.

Almost 30 years later, Paul visits Queensland and sees Glen sitting on a bench without his wheelchair opposite a Lassiters Hotel. When Paul goes to investigate, Glen is gone. When Glen later sees Lucy at the entrance of the hotel, he begins to approach her, but stops when he notices Paul is there too. Glen introduces himself to a drunken Terese Willis and learns she is Paul's estranged wife. Glen then meets Paul, Lucy and Terese and it is clear that he still has animosity towards Paul for his past behaviour. Glen tells Paul and Lucy that his paralysis was misdiagnosed and he recovered his mobility with rehabilitation. He also explains that he married Karen, but they are now separated, and he lives in Nambucca Heads. When he saw that Lucy was in Queensland for a conference, he decided to visit too. Glen tells Terese that he will keep her alcohol relapse a secret, but advises her to talk to someone about it. He later tells Lucy that Terese is more vulnerable than people might think.

Glen returns to Erinsborough, where he meets his nephew, David Tanaka (Takaya Honda), and his grandniece, Harlow Robinson (Jemma Donovan), during a family lunch with Paul. Terese asks Glen why he has returned and Glen reveals it is to stop anyone else from being hurt by Paul. Glen is introduced to his other nephew, Leo Tanaka (Tim Kano), and Paul suggests that Leo offers Glen a job at his vineyard, which Glen accepts. Terese discovers Glen used to be an alcoholic and becomes concerned with him taking up the job offer, but Glen tells her he will be okay. It is revealed that Glen is hiding personal information and Terese's ring in his hotel room and a suspicious Harlow begins snooping. Glen and Terese continue to bond and develop feelings for each other. Meanwhile, Harlow hires private investigator John Wong to find information on Glen. Harlow confronts Terese with the information on the top of Lassiter's roof, but the wind blows the papers out of Harlow's hand. Glen freezes when Terese then falls over the side of the building, but Paul rescues her. Glen confronts John and he later tells Harlow the only incriminating information he found on Glen were some parking fines. Glen then moves into Terese's house. Glen flirts with Gemma ahead of her daughter's wedding, but is then caught having sex with Sharon Canning (Natasha Herbert) by Gemma and Terese. Glen visits Paul in the hospital after he is injured by falling debris in a storm. Harlow also calls a truce between them. Glen later admits that he took Terese's ring and Paul demands he leaves Erinsborough for good, but David tells him he must stay to help in the vineyard.

== Reception ==
In 1993, Huggett received a nomination for Best Actor In Soap from the Inside Soap TV Awards. Sue Malins of the Daily Mirror said the arrival of Jim's illegitimate son "might turn out to be a half-way decent storyline" just when the soap had been going "terminally soft". But she also wrote that Glen appeared to be "yet another tedious juvenile in Ramsay Street." Peter Holmes of The Sydney Morning Herald branded Huggett "Neighbours' new sex bomb" upon his introduction. Malins later named him "the latest Neighbours heart throb" and "the new Neighbours pin-up".

While discussing the lack of "good-looking soap men" in Neighbours, a Jackie columnist stated that "Glen makes things a bit more bearable". Karen Bergin of Sunday World commented "Neighbours barman Glen Donnolly [sic] may look like butter wouldn't melt in his mouth – but you know what they say about the quiet ones..." Bergin also wrote that Huggett's character in E Street was a chance to see the "goody-goody Australian hunk in a much meatier role". Following his accident, Josephine Monroe, author of Neighbours: The First 10 Years, quipped "nothing could remove the chip on his shoulder the size of Ayer's Rock."

To celebrate the 20th anniversary of Neighbours, the BBC asked readers to nominate their twenty favourite obscure characters. Glen came in seventh place and the readers said "Jim's son that he fathered during a fling in Vietnam. Now not acknowledged as one of his children". The BBC also said Glen's most notable moment was "Falling from the roof at Lassiter's and becoming paraplegic." In July 2020, Joe Julians of the Radio Times called for the character to make a comeback, citing his rivalry with Paul Robinson as the reason for a potential return. Julians wrote "If you're looking for someone with a personal grudge against Paul to inflict some drama into his life, you cannot get much better than Glen."
