= Terese Willis =

Fictional character from Neighbours

- Neighbours character
- Portrayed by: Rebekah Elmaloglou
- Duration: 2013–2025
- First appearance: 14 May 2013
- Last appearance: 11 December 2025
- Introduced by: Richard Jasek
- Spin-off appearances: Neighbours vs Zombies (2014); Summer Stories (2016); Pipe Up (2017); Neighbours vs Time Travel (2017)
In-universe information
- Occupation: Hotel manager Co-owner of Lassiters Hotel; Founder and owner of Eirini Rising
- Family: Willis; Robinson
- Mother: Estelle Petrides
- Brothers: Nick Petrides
- Husband: Brad Willis (until 2016); Paul Robinson (2019–; divorced); Toadie Rebecchi (2023–; separated)
- Sons: Josh Willis
- Daughters: Imogen Willis; Piper Willis
- Stepsons: Ned Willis; David Tanaka; Leo Tanaka; Hugo Rebecchi
- Stepdaughters: Paige Smith; Nell Rebecchi
- Grandsons: Gabriel Smith (step)
- Granddaughters: Matilda Turner; Harlow Robinson (step)
- Nephews: Zac Willis (in-law)
- Nieces: Roxy Willis (in-law)

Terese Willis is a fictional character from the Australian soap opera Neighbours, played by Rebekah Elmaloglou. The actress was cast in the role after attending an audition in late 2012. Before she began filming her first scenes in early February 2013, Elmaloglou had to ask the producers to change the pronunciation of her character's name. Elmaloglou's character and her family were created around the character of Brad Willis (Kip Gamblin), who was reintroduced after twenty years as part of an ongoing overhaul of the show's cast and renewed focus on family units. She made her first appearance during the episode broadcast on 14 May 2013.

Terese is portrayed as being ambitious, organised, hard-working and a good mother. Elmaloglou said she admired Terese and that while they shared some similarities, they did not have much in common. Terese was introduced as the manager of Lassiter's Hotel, owned by Paul Robinson (Stefan Dennis). Terese and Paul share a love/hate relationship, but despite the tension between them, they work well together. They eventually start a relationship and get married. Terese's other storylines have revolved around the breakup of her marriage to Brad, her alcoholism, an attempted assault by Ezra Hanley (Steve Nation), a breast cancer diagnosis and relationships with Paul's son Leo Tanaka (Tim Kano) and Paul's half-brother Glen Donnelly (Richard Huggett). Terese's turbulent marriage to Paul was rekindled in the serial's finale episode; she returned in a regular capacity for the series' revival in 2023, which focused on the character's wedding to Toadie Rebecchi (Ryan Moloney).

== Creation and casting ==
On 7 February 2013, it was announced that the four-strong Willis family would be introduced to Neighbours, as part of an ongoing overhaul of the show's cast and a renewed focus on family units. News of the Willis family's introduction came shortly after producers decided to also bring in the five-strong Turner family. Executive producer Richard Jasek commented, "As viewers will find out shortly, the Turners are a family of secrets, and the unique backstory of the Willis family is just as compelling." The character of Brad Willis (formerly Benjamin Mitchell and Scott Michaelson, now Kip Gamblin) was reintroduced to the show, along with his wife Terese and their teenage twins; Josh (Harley Bonner) and Imogen (Ariel Kaplan).

Actress Rebekah Elmaloglou was cast in the role of Terese, the matriarch of the Willis family. Elmaloglou's agent asked her to audition for the role in late 2012 and she thought appearing in Neighbours would be something "interesting to do", especially as she had previously appeared in rival soap opera Home and Away. Elmaloglou won the role and she and her family relocated to Melbourne where the Neighbours studios are based. The actress thought it was an exciting time to join the show and did not feel under any pressure. She also said the production style was similar to Home and Away, but Neighbours was fast paced because they shoot an extra episode a week.

Before she began filming, Elmaloglou asked the producers to change the pronunciation of her character's name. Elmaloglou was initially happy with her character's name, as it was a deviation of her mother's name, Theresa. However, she was concerned about the pronunciation chosen by the producers, explaining "At first I thought, 'That's nice, I'll always have mum close to me' – until I realised it's pronounced exactly how mum hates it! I knew she would cringe every time she watched me on Neighbours." The producers agreed to change the pronunciation shortly before Terese was mentioned on-screen. Elmaloglou started filming her scenes two weeks after the casting announcement. Elmaloglou made her first screen appearance as Terese on 14 May 2013.

== Development ==
=== Characterisation ===
Elmaloglou described Terese as being "ambitious, organised and extremely capable when it comes to her job". She thought her character would appear to be "a tough nut", but she displays a softer side when it comes to her family. Elmaloglou liked that Terese's personality was changeable as it made her interesting. She did not think Terese had a devious side, but she often riled people when she made decisions on their behalf. A writer for the show's official website called Terese "a devoted wife, loving mother and hard-working career woman." They also agreed that she was ambitious and had put in the hard work to achieve her dreams.

Elmaloglou said "Terese is a good mum, but she's also very career-orientated too. I think Terese worries about it a little bit more than she should." Elmaloglou thought Terese was the kind of person she would be friends with, branding her an "all-rounder". She explained that she admires Terese and is quite similar to her in terms of how organised they both were. However, Elmaloglou thought Terese was more businesslike than her and she was unsure if she could be the mother of three children. She later commented that she and Terese did not really have anything in common and that she was much naughtier than Terese was.

=== Marriage to Brad Willis and family ===
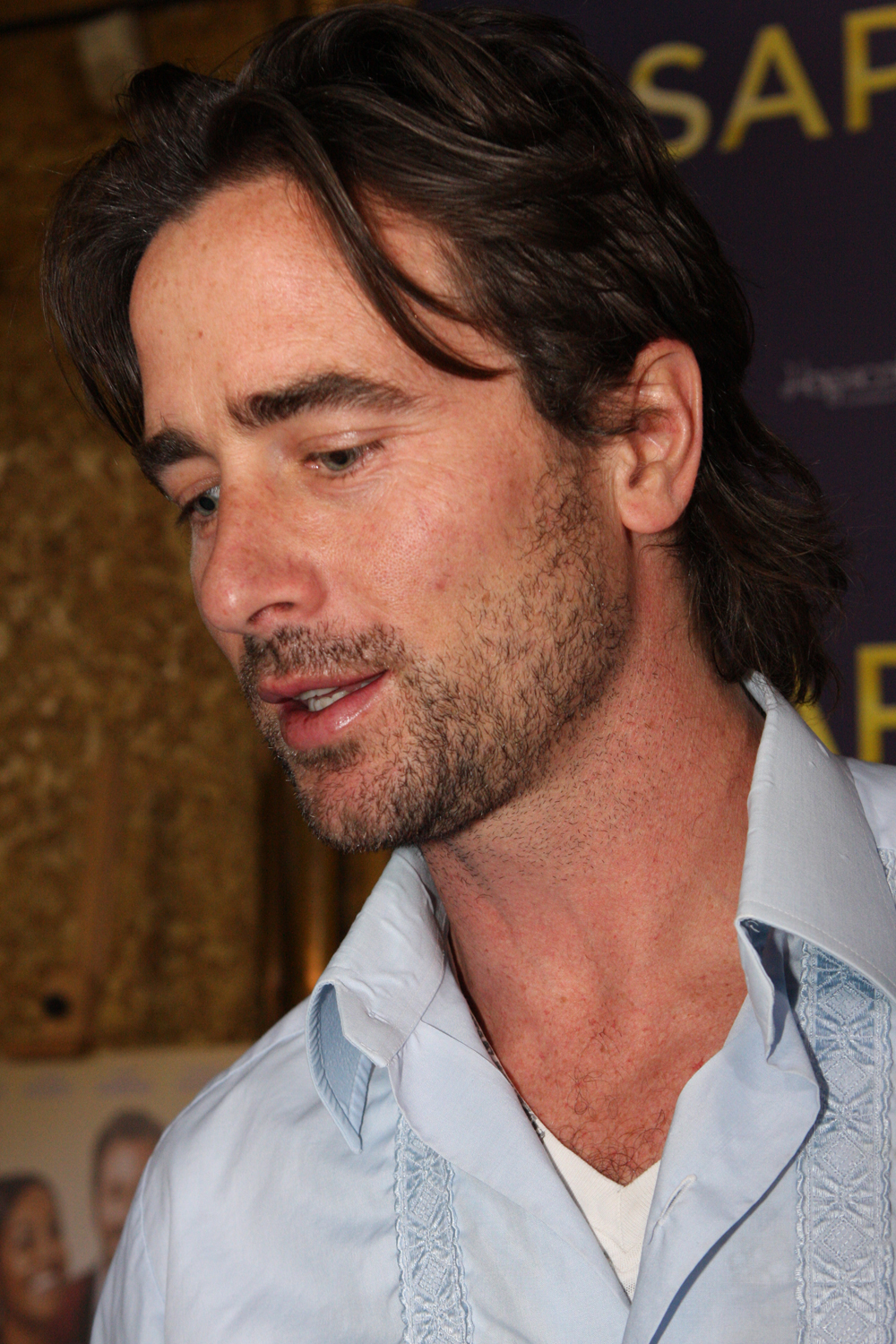
Kip Gamblin (pictured) played Terese's husband Brad Willis.

Terese married Brad Willis (Gamblin) when she was 21. They have three children; twins Josh and Imogen, and Piper. Gamblin explained that Brad and Terese met and married very quickly. Terese has some issues with Brad's former wife Beth (Natalie Imbruglia) because of their history and Gamblin called the situation "a bit messy". Gamblin added that Brad and Terese's marriage was pretty strong. Elmaloglou agreed, calling the marriage "absolutely solid" and saying that although Brad and Terese are different, they work well together. Prior to relocating to Erinsborough, Terese had become the breadwinner and was running the family, as Brad was busy coaching Josh, who was a competitive swimmer. Shortly after her arrival, Terese was introduced to Brad's ex-girlfriend Lauren (Kate Kendall). Elmaloglou explained that Terese was aware of Brad's past and she was fairly relaxed about it. As Terese felt secure in her marriage, she got on well with Lauren and their respective husbands became rivals instead.

Elmaloglou was initially shocked that she was cast as the mother of three teenagers and told a New Idea writer that she liked to think Terese was a very young mother. After Imogen was diagnosed with an eating disorder, Elmaloglou said Terese and Brad would feel guilty for not noticing, as they had been too focused on Josh and his swimming. The actress said the situation wakes them up and makes them realise that they had been neglecting their daughter. Elmaloglou commented, "There is an element of regret that they weren't more in tune with Imogen and her problems." Imogen found it hard to accept that her parents knew about her condition and their reaction was just added pressure. In an effort to help Imogen, Terese opened up to her about her own eating disorder she had suffered with as a teenager. Kaplan called the moment "really powerful" and thought it would bring Imogen and Terese closer together, as well as help Imogen to come to terms with her own condition.

Elmaloglou hoped that Brad and Terese's youngest daughter, Piper, would be introduced at some point, especially after the characters began talking about her more during storylines. Elmaloglou thought Piper's introduction would add another dynamic to the family because of her young age. In early 2014, Lauren told Brad that she had given birth to his daughter twenty years ago. Lauren had believed that their daughter died soon after birth, but she had actually been adopted out. Terese did not take the revelation well and Elmaloglou said it was definitely a shock and not something she had ever prepared for. She explained that Terese had been fine with the fact that Lauren and Brad had dated, but she struggled with the new situation and she worried about her own family and how the news would affect them. When asked what advice she would give Terese, Elmaloglou replied "My advice to Terese would be to think before reacting and while it's a huge ask, try to put herself in Lauren's shoes... And watch Lauren like a hawk!"

In April 2014, Terence Donovan returned to Neighbours as Doug Willis, Brad's father. Donovan had previously played Elmaloglou's on-screen father in Home and Away. The actress was pleased to be reunited with Donovan "as father and daughter-in-law after all these years." On-screen, Terese expressed her fears that Doug preferred Brad's ex-wife Beth to her. As Doug was "old school", he was not keen on Terese balancing her career and family. He was also not used to Terese's feisty side. Elmaloglou thought Terese was being a little paranoid and said the fact was Doug and his wife, Pam (Sue Jones), had spent more time with Beth. During Doug's visit, Terese was "bemused" when she found the television remote in the fridge and assumed Doug was getting a little forgetful due to his old age. Doug continued to have memory lapses, but Brad refused to listen to Terese's assumptions that it might be more serious, insisting that Doug was fine. However, Doug was later diagnosed with Alzheimer's disease. Elmaloglou added that the diagnosis would affect the family and she hoped Donovan and Jones would return to explore the storyline further, as it is a common disease.

=== Lassiter's Hotel ===
Terese is introduced as the new manager of Lassiter's Hotel, which is owned by Paul Robinson (Stefan Dennis). Terese decides to visit Erinsborough alone to check out the hotel and meet with Paul. Elmaloglou told an Inside Soap reporter, "This is the perfect chance for Terese to see things at the hotel as they really are before Paul can cover anything up!" Paul believes he is conducting an interview for the manager's job, so he is surprised when Terese lets slip that his sister, Lucy Robinson (Melissa Bell), has already offered her the job without consulting him. Elmaloglou said Terese is keen to get on with things and it would not take her long to get the measure of Paul. She also said that Terese and Paul are "fantastic foils for each other" and she believed Terese is capable of holding her own with Paul. Dennis found that Terese and Paul shared a love/hate relationship and said Paul respected Terese for her business skills and the way she stands up to him. Stefan added that while there is a tension between them, they did work well together.

In January 2014, Terese and Paul's working relationship is strained when Paul tries to make things intolerable for Terese at Lassiter's. Dennis told John Burfitt from TV Soap that Paul wants to make Terese as uncomfortable as possible in order to get rid of her from the hotel. He explained, "I actually don't think he genuinely dislikes her, but he has decided to dislike her as he had no control in her being there and being such a control freak, he didn't like Lucy coming in and telling him who was going to work there. He then decided to buck back against the decision and push her out in every way he can." After Paul pushes Terese too far, she quits her job with immediate effect. Lucy is "furious" by the new, as she knows that Terese is a great employee. Lucy then threatens to remove the hotel from the Lassiter's chain to make Paul see sense. Neither Elmaloglou or Dennis thought Terese and Paul would have an affair in the immediate future, with Elmaloglou saying that Terese's marriage to Brad was very solid. However, she thought with all the tension between Terese and Paul, there could be an underlying attraction between them.

=== Marital problems and Ezra Hanley ===
When Brad and Terese experienced difficulties in their marriage, Terese walked out on Brad and moved into Lassiter's. Elmaloglou enjoyed working on the storyline, but she also found it hard as she loved that Brad and Terese had such a solid marriage. The storyline also gave her a chance to explore Terese's many levels and said that "a different side of her" would emerge. Elmaloglou explained that Terese did not think her marriage was over, but she had realised that instead of blaming her problems on other people, she needed to work out what had gone wrong within the marriage and her relationship with Brad. She continued, "Terese is not moving out because of a final decision over her marriage, it's just that the last six to twelve months have been so overwhelming and she needs space. Who knows whether moving into Lassiters is really a good idea, but it's just a way for her to take some time out of the Ramsay Street situation." While Terese was staying in the hotel, Paul invited her former boss, Ezra Hanley (Steve Nation), to Erinsborough. Terese had previously admitted to having feelings for Ezra. Elmaloglou said viewers would be questioning why Paul would bring Ezra and thought the most likely reason was that he did not like Brad.

The actress was concerned that some people would think that Terese was trying to get payback on Brad by spending time with Ezra, but she said that Terese was just confused and placed in "a very vulnerable situation". Elmaloglou added "There's so much going on at home, so Terese falls into a trap and gets caught up in a situation. It was challenging to film, but it was something a little bit different, which I liked." When Ezra later asked Terese to dinner, she accepted following another argument with Brad, who suggested that they make their split more permanent. Dennis said Paul was pleased with the development as he wanted Terese to have some fun and be with someone more "intellectually matched with her". After dinner, Ezra suggested that he and Terese should go to her room to continue working on plans for the Erinsborough Festival. Terese "ignored her fears" and agreed. However, she regretted her decision when Ezra made advances towards her and chose not to accept her refusal.

Terese was "furious" with Paul for bringing Ezra back into her life and for telling Brad that she had spent the night with him. When she told Paul that Ezra had tried to attack her, Paul felt guilty and Dennis said he was "genuinely concerned" about Terese. Brad later found Terese and admitted that he still loved her, causing her to break down in his arms and confess what had happened with Ezra. After Ezra was dismissed from his job, he tried to sue Paul and Terese. When Terese suggested that they give him a settlement, Paul assures her that he has another idea to get rid of him. Shortly afterwards, Terese found Ezra badly beaten and unconscious. During the police investigation, Terese was found to be physically incapable of committing the crime, while Paul had an alibi. The police then suggested that either Josh or Brad could be responsible, with Brad having recently had a hand injury treated. However, it soon emerged that Paul had hired Gary Canning (Damien Richardson) to assault Ezra.

In May 2015, Ezra returned to Erinsborough as the acquisitions manager for Lassiter's following its sale to another hotel chain. Elmaloglou told All About Soap's Claire Crick that Terese was initially worried about her job after the sale, but Paul assured her she would be okay. After she started to relax, Terese was "mortified" to discover that Ezra was in charge. Elmaloglou explained, "She tries to be grown-up about it, but he makes her life miserable. She hasn't forgotten what happened when he was last in Erinsborough." Terese later quit her job after she could not take it anymore. Elmaloglou stated that Brad was behind Terese's decision and suggested that she should take a break and go to Canada to see their youngest daughter Piper. The actress commented that Terese was worried about leaving Brad behind with Lauren, but she just had to have faith in them. Elmaloglou added that she hoped Terese would get her job back, so she could continue to work with Paul.

=== Alcoholism ===
As Terese worries about her job, her children's problems, and Brad's closeness with Lauren, whose husband Matt died, she turns to alcohol to cope. The storyline initially sees Terese drinking more at lunchtime and after work, but she tries to cover it up, as she does not want to risk losing her job. However, Sheila Canning (Colette Mann) soon notices some of the stock at The Waterhole has been stolen and sets up CCTV on the storeroom, where Terese is caught helping herself. Shelia confronts Terese, who tries to dismiss her concerns. But Sheila goes through the Willis' bins for evidence and finds a bottle that was taken from The Waterhole. A fearful Terese tells Sheila off for questioning her integrity, but a Waterhole employee later comments on Terese's drinking, leading Sheila to ask whether she has a problem with alcohol. In an attempt to prove that she does not have a drinking problem, Terese agrees to Brad's suggestion that they take part in the "Alcohol-free August" campaign, but Terese later enjoys a bottle of wine with Paul, causing more strain on her marriage.

While attending an AA meeting, Terese meets Walter Mitchell (Greg Stone) and has an instant connection with him. Sonya warns Terese that Walter's intentions might not be honourable, but Terese arranges a date with him, which ends in a kiss between them. Elmaloglou commented, "Walter is attractive and funny, and a nice diversion from all the stuff Terese has had to go through." When Paul goes on trial for causing an explosion at Lassiter's, which contributed to the deaths of Doug and Josh, Terese commits perjury in a bid to see him jailed. After her lies are revealed, Terese struggles to cope and begins drinking again. Following her arrest for perverting the course of justice, Terese drinks until she passes out. Piper then finds her mother collapsed in the laundry room.

=== Breast cancer ===
In another issue-led storyline, Terese is diagnosed with breast cancer in mid-2017. When the producers were creating the storyline, they decided to consult Elmaloglou first, as they were aware that her mother had breast cancer the previous year. She accepted the story immediately, saying "I didn't hesitate at all because it is so common and people can relate to it." Elmaloglou spoke with her mother about her experience in order to portray the condition accurately. The plot begins with Terese finding a lump in her breast and undergoing a biopsy, which comes back all clear. However, Terese "senses that something isn't quite right" and she soon learns that her grandmother died from breast cancer, so she asks to be re-tested. Doctor Karl Kennedy (Alan Fletcher) informs Terese that she does have breast cancer after all. Elmaloglou said that the moment is "pretty overwhelming" for Terese. Of filming the scenes, she commented "I'm quite good at separating my work life from real life – but because my mother has just gone through breast cancer, those emotions are still quite raw. Having to say the words 'I have cancer' was quite confronting." She also said that the message about following up test results when your not satisfied with the diagnosis was really important.

Terese decides to keep the news from her family and partner, Gary Canning. Elmaloglou was understanding of Terese's reaction, but due to her experience with her mother, she felt that someone diagnosed with cancer needed love and support from their family, as the treatment could be "very debilitating". Terese ends up confiding in Paul, who has suffered a cancer scare of his own. Elmaloglou added that Terese was "a tough cookie" and she was confident for her survival. Terese eventually reveals her diagnosis to her family. She also starts losing her hair due to the chemotherapy treatment. Elmaloglou explained, "It's very confronting for Terese when her hair starts to fall out, and it's at that moment she realises she's very sick. She's doing her best, but it's not easy being brave for everyone else." When Terese learns that her treatment is not working, Gary visits her oncologist brother Nick Petrides (Damien Fotiou) in prison and asks for his help, as Nick has been researching alternative cancer treatments. Terese is initially "very reluctant" to receive help from Nick, as he gave Paul a false cancer diagnosis, which almost killed him. However, Terese is aware that chemotherapy is not working and that Nick is one of the best oncologists in the world, so she puts herself first.

Terese's new treatment works and she soon learns that her tumours have shrunk. She receives the news while she is with Paul, and she tells him first. The moment leads them to have sex, despite the fact she is engaged to Gary. Talking to Johnathon Hughes of Radio Times, Elmaloglou commented "Yes, it's an interesting way to celebrate! It's a shared, spontaneous moment. Despite their history, there is still an emotional attachment." Terese chooses to keep quiet about her infidelity, after learning that Gary has organised an engagement party for them. Elmaloglou told Hughes that her character feels immense guilt, but she wants to stay with Gary. Of Terese's future following her cancer battle, the actress said "things are looking very positive with her treatment and that's how I wanted the story to play out."

=== Relationship with Leo Tanaka ===
Following the end of Terese and Gary's relationship, writers paired her with Paul's son Leo Tanaka (Tim Kano). Elmaloglou was surprised when she was told about the development by their producer, saying it was the last thing she was expecting. She was also worried about how she and Kano would look on-screen, and admitted to feeling a little insecure. She said: "I'm so little and voluptuous, and Tim's so tall and slim – I just thought, 'How's this going to work?!' We couldn't be more different! I've had to stand on boxes for the kissing scenes". Kano was excited by the storyline, but also nervous about viewer reaction to the age gap between the characters and Leo's betrayal of Paul. He told Sarah Ellis of Inside Soap that he could understand Leo's attraction to Terese, calling her his "ideal woman". He also told Ellis that the scenes between the characters were "quite risqué – they were the raunchiest scenes we've done on the show yet!" Terese and Leo have sex in one of the hotel rooms, after they both turn up to investigate reports that it has been trashed. Elmaloglou commented that it was not premeditated, but "one thing just leads to another..." Terese feels guilty afterwards and they initially decide that it cannot happen again.

Both actors thought the couple had genuine feelings for one another, and were not motivated by revenge on Paul. Elmaloglou told Ellis that Terese is "really flattered that this gorgeous young man fancies her, then she sees a side to him that's quite lovely." Elmaloglou thought there would always be something between Terese and Paul, which might affect her relationship with Leo. Kano said his character was insecure about their closeness and he said things would not be simple, especially as Terese and Paul are often brought together for work. The couple conduct their relationship in secret, but Terese's assistant Chloe Brennan (April Rose Pengilly) soon finds them together. Kano believed a showdown between Leo and Paul was "inevitable", while Elmaloglou said they knew "all hell will break loose". Terese is also concerned with telling Piper before she learns about the romance from someone else. Paul learns about the relationship when he walks in on Leo and Terese kissing. Leo attempts to explain his feelings for Terese, but Paul feels betrayed by his son and tries to break them up. First he offers Leo a job overseas, then he tells Terese that she cannot please a younger man, before firing Leo from his job and disowning him.

The relationship is also tested by the arrival of Delaney Renshaw (Ella Newton), who was introduced during an exploration of Leo's fictional backstory. Delaney blackmails Leo into ending the relationship with Terese and dating her instead, as she has had a crush on him for years. The situation also helps Leo and Paul to reconcile. When Delaney makes threats about Terese, Leo realises he needs to protect her. Kano said "If Terese knew what was going on, it would put her in danger. Leo has to try to find a way to keep his partner safe." Writers created a siege storyline around Leo's feud with the Renshaw's, which culminates in Terese being shot by Delaney's uncle Ivan Renshaw (Michael Shanahan). Leo is the target of Ivan's revenge, but Terese throws herself in front of him and takes the bullet. She survives the shooting, but the incident raises the subject of her feelings for Paul, whose relationship with Jane Harris (Annie Jones) ends when she realises he is still in love with Terese. Piper also hears Terese call out Paul's name while she is semi-conscious.

Terese reunites with Leo, who decides to propose to her on Valentine's Day. Kano described Terese as "speechless, and very embarrassed" by the gesture. She turns down the proposal and breaks up with Leo, leaving him "absolutely devastated." Paul confronts Terese about hurting Leo, and she admits that she ended the relationship because she cannot stop thinking about him. Leo then walks in on them together, and Kano commented that the moment is "devastating – it's the ultimate humiliation. Leo finds them kissing, and he doesn't believe what he is witnessing. To be betrayed by the woman he loves and his father, I'm not sure there is anything worse." As Terese moves on with Paul, Leo embarrasses himself by drunkenly declaring his love for her, before kissing Piper. Elmaloglou said Terese believed Leo would "be more low-key" with his reaction and she is "mortified" by his relationship with her daughter. She briefly thinks he might be using Piper to spite her, but she ultimately focuses on her new relationship with Paul.

=== Return (2023) ===
In February 2023, Terese's return as series regular was announced as part of the series' resumption, with new episodes due to air from later in 2023.

== Storylines ==
After accepting the Lassiter's Erinsborough general manager's job, Terese meets with the hotel's owner Paul Robinson for a tour. Paul is initially unaware that she has the job and Terese allows him to interview her, before telling him that she just wanted to make sure they would work well together. Terese moves into Number 22 Ramsay Street with her husband Brad and their twins Imogen and Josh. She learns that Brad's former girlfriend, Lauren Turner, is living across the street and befriends her. Terese fires receptionist Caroline Perkins (Alinta Chidzey) for being lazy and rude, but Caroline then sues the hotel, claiming that Paul sexually harassed her. Terese arranges for Caroline to be paid off. After Terese stays late at work, Brad accuses Paul of trying to take advantage of her in front of an inspector, costing the hotel its five-star rating. Terese assures Brad that he got it wrong. Susan Kennedy (Jackie Woodburne) becomes concerned that Imogen might have an eating disorder, but Terese dismisses her concerns. However, Imogen later collapses and is admitted to hospital with a torn oesophagus, as a result of bulimia. Terese tells Imogen about her own eating disorder in an attempt to get her to open up.

Paul promotes Terese to Head of Operations for the Lassiter's complex. He installs paid parking for the complex, angering the business owners. Terese realises Paul set her up, so she increases the maintenance rates for the apartment tenants and scraps the paid parking. Relations between Paul and Terese deteriorate and she quits her job. Paul threatens to sue her for breach of contract, but Terese counter-sues him for defamation. Lucy convinces Paul to reinstate Terese. Brad sues Mason Turner (Taylor Glockner) when Josh is injured in an abseiling accident, causing tension between the Willis and Turner families. Terese tries to persuade Mason to leave Erinsborough for a job in Darwin and Lauren accuses her of wanting to get rid of her son. Terese struggles to cope when Lauren informs Brad that they have a daughter together, who was adopted out. When Brad's father, Doug, visits, Terese believes that he prefers Brad's first wife, Beth, to her, but they rebuild their relationship when Doug is diagnosed with Alzheimer's disease. Brad's mother, Pam, soon arrives in Erinsborough and Terese helps her see that Doug needs her support.

Terese begins seeing Imogen's counsellor as a way of coping with all the stress in her life. Brad and Lauren fly to Adelaide to find their daughter. Brad stays longer than planned, causing further estrangement from Terese. When he returns, Terese questions the strength of their marriage but they reconcile. Terese pushes Brad to take a teaching position at Erinsborough High. She also tries to help Paul when he becomes depressed, and clashes with hotel guest Paige Novak (Olympia Valance). Paige is revealed to be Lauren and Brad's long lost daughter and Terese struggles to accept her. Upon learning Paige trashed Harold's Store, Terese has her arrested. She tries to convince Lauren's husband Matt (Josef Brown) to join her in keeping an eye on Paige, but he refuses. Terese later drops the charges and decides to give Paige the benefit of the doubt. When Terese learns that Brad kissed Lauren in Adelaide, she orders Brad to stay away from Lauren, suspecting a continuing affair. Terese and Brad's marriage becomes strained, and Terese moves into the hotel.

Paul invites Terese's former boss Ezra Hanley to Erinsborough to help her organise a festival. Terese and Ezra almost kiss, but Terese pulls away, realising she loves Brad. She asks Ezra to leave her room, but he refuses and Terese has to physically force him to go. Brad asks Terese to work on their marriage and she agrees. Ezra attempts to sue Terese and Paul, but he soon leaves after he is attacked by a mystery assailant. Terese's brother Nick Petrides (Damien Fotiou) takes up a job at the hospital. She learns that the day before her wedding to Brad, Nick engineered a meeting between Brad and his ex-wife, to see if Brad was faithful to her. She tries to calm things between Brad and Nick as they feud. Terese stops Matt from having an affair with Sharon Canning (Natasha Herbert). After he dies, Terese tries to keep Sharon from talking to Lauren and sends her on a cruise. She starts to worry about Brad and Lauren's closeness. It soon emerges that Nick has been treating Paul for leukaemia that he does not have and he is arrested.

Ezra returns as the acquisitions manager for the Quill Group, who purchase Lassiter's. He reduces Terese's responsibilities and when he makes a suggestive comment, Terese quits her job. Upon her return, Terese learns from Ezra's son Clem (Max Whitelaw) that his former girlfriend, Chloe Jones (Gaby Seow), accused Ezra of assaulting her. Terese encourages Chloe to go to the police, which results in Ezra's arrest. The Quill Group hire Terese as the manager of Lassiter's. Still feeling insecure in her marriage, Terese pushes Lauren and Robin Dawal (Max Brown) together. Terese also realises Paige is trying to reunite Brad and Lauren, so she encourages Paige's adoptive mother Mary (Gina Liano) to reconcile with her daughter and take her to Singapore. Terese begins drinking and develops alcoholism, causing further issues in her marriage. Terese later learns Brad had sex with Lauren, ending their marriage. Brad and Terese's youngest daughter Piper (Mavournee Hazel) returns from Canada. Terese is caught up in a fire that breaks out at Erinsborough High. She and Lauren become trapped beneath some lockers, and Brad is only able to rescue Lauren. Terese suffers serious burns and has to undergo a skin graft. Terese develops sepsis and Brad vows to help out more while she recovers.

Terese invites Paul to live with her after he loses ownership of Lassiter's, despite a conflict of interest as Terese's new boss, Julie Quill (Gail Easdale), is an old enemy of Paul's. Lauren nominates Terese for a "Women in Business Award". Terese kisses Paul and tries to seduce him, only to change her mind at the last moment. When Paul keeps trying to undermine Julie, Terese, caught in the middle, chooses her job over her friendship with Paul and asks him to move out. The hotel boiler explodes and both Josh and Doug die. Paul supports her and tells her he loves her, but she is horrified when Paul is arrested for the explosion. Terese meets Walter Mitchell at an AA meeting and they briefly date. Terese bribes Cecilia Saint (Candice Alley) into committing perjury, so Paul is sent to prison. However, during the trial, Terese drinks and admits to the bribery. She is charged with perverting the course of justice and fired by Julie. Terese continues drinking and collapses in the laundry room. She then leaves Erinsborough for a health retreat in Tasmania and is later given a suspended sentence. With the financial help of the Udagawa family, Terese buys Lassiter's.

Terese disapproves of Piper's relationship with Tyler Brennan (Travis Burns), due to the age gap between them. Piper accuses Terese of hypocrisy when she has a brief romance with Ryan Prescott (James Sweeny), who is much younger than her. Ryan is behind a series of hidden cameras found in Lassiter's, so Terese confronts him and eventually gains the USB that the footage is on, using the help of Tim Collins (Ben Anderson). Terese then has Ryan's car towed. Terese and Brad hold a divorce party, and she witnesses Brad proposing to Lauren. Terese has a date with Gary Canning (Damien Richardson), but soon discovers he is working for Paul. Leo Tanaka attempts to play Terese and Paul off against each other, and he later outbids them for the Men's Shed tender. Terese bans Piper from dating Tyler while she is living at home, so Piper moves out. Terese and Gary grow closer and begin a relationship. Terese breaks up with Gary after suspecting he is having an affair with his former partner Brooke Butler (Fifi Box). Gary explains that he was just helping Brooke reconnect with her daughter Jessie. He and Terese reconcile and become engaged. Paul later declares his feelings for her.

Terese experiences pain in her chest and finds a lump on her breast. She undergoes a biopsy, which comes back negative. Terese asks for the test to be run again after learning her grandmother died from breast cancer and it comes back positive. Terese keeps her diagnosis a secret but later confides in Paul, who keeps her company at her first chemotherapy session. Gary wrongly assumes Terese is pregnant or drinking again, so she tells him and Piper that she has cancer. Terese is sick during a meeting with potential investors and Jasmine Udagawa (Kaori Maeda-Judge) admits to being concerned about her recent performance. After firing her assistant, Terese offers Paige the job. Terese begins losing her hair and tells Paul that she does not think her treatment is working. Gary meets with Nick to discuss her diagnosis and persuades Terese to visit him. Nick tells Terese that immunotherapy could help her and she agrees to speak at his parole hearing. Nick is released from prison and he oversees Terese's new treatment. Jasmine learns about Terese's cancer and the Udagawas threaten to remove their investment. Paul persuades Toshiro Udagawa (Lawrence Mah) to stand by Terese. After Terese learns her tumours have shrunk, she and Paul have sex. Terese fires Courtney Grixti (Emma Lane) when she wrongly assumes that she has been giving the male clients of the day spa erotic massages. Courtney later tries to sue her. Lassiters is also downgraded to a three-star hotel. Terese tells Susan about her affair with Paul, and Susan pulls out of performing the wedding ceremony. Terese decides to go ahead with the wedding, but during the ceremony, she tells Gary she cheated on him with Paul. Devastated, he ends their engagement. Terese goes to Paul but learns he is engaged to Courtney after an apparent whirlwind romance. Paul informs Terese that he has bought Mr Udagawa's share of Lassiters, making him her boss. He also installs Courtney as a rejuvenation consultant for the hotel and she regularly clashes with Terese.

Weeks after their failed wedding, Terese and Gary reconcile, but their relationship is constantly troubled by Gary's distrust of Paul. Terese proposes to Gary and he accepts, but after finding Terese and Paul working late at the hotel, he realises he cannot move past her betrayal and ends their relationship. Paul asks Terese to mentor his son Leo Tanaka (Tim Kano). After months of working together closely, Leo declares his feelings for Terese. She rejects him and ends the mentorship, but slowly realises she reciprocates Leo's feelings and they have sex. They keep their fling a secret from Paul, who is still hopeful for a reconciliation with Terese. He catches them together at the penthouse and seeks revenge for their betrayal. Evicted from Paul's penthouse, Leo moves in with Terese and their relationship strengthens, despite constant opposition from Paul. Leo tells Terese that he loves her but suddenly breaks up with her to pursue a relationship with Delaney Renshaw (Ella Newton). Terese tries to find out why he broke up with her but eventually accepts that he has moved on. After Piper overhears Delaney taking a suspicious phone call, Terese goes through her things but is caught. She then attempts to seduce Paul, but he rejects her advances. Leo tells Terese that he broke up with Delaney and still loves her, but she refuses to listen to him. Delaney's uncle, Ivan Renshaw (Michael Shanahan), shoots at Leo, but accidentally hits Terese instead. She is shot in the shoulder, and the blood vessels around the injury are damaged, requiring further surgery. While in hospital, Terese unconsciously tells Piper that she still loves Paul. Terese makes a full recovery. Leo and Terese get back together and Leo proposes to her, but she rejects the proposal as she does not see a future with him. Paul confronts Terese and she admits that she still has feelings for him and they kiss. Leo walks in on them and accuses Terese and Paul of having an affair behind his back. Leo wrecks the hotel's Valentine's Day display and injures Vera Punt (Sally-Anne Upton). He then gets drunk and causes a scene in the street, as he begs Terese to come back to him. While giving an apology to Vera, Leo reveals that he is now dating Piper. Terese accuses Leo of seducing Piper out of revenge and says she thought Piper had more self-respect. Terese later apologises to Piper.

A few months later, Terese becomes engaged to Paul. Leo and Paul's daughter, Elle Robinson (Pippa Black), concoct a plan to stop Terese from marrying Paul. One by one, all of Paul's ex-wives – Gail Robinson (Fiona Corke), Lyn Scully (Janet Andrewartha), Rebecca Napier (Jane Hall) and Christina Alessi (Gayle Blakeny) – return to Erinsborough to try and convince Terese into not marrying Paul. Gail informs Terese that she wants Paul's granddaughter, Harlow Robinson (Jemma Donovan), to live with her in Tasmania, but Terese and Paul convince her not to. Terese sees Paul hugging Rebecca on the Lassiter's mezzanine and confronts them. Paul explains that he was comforting Rebecca, who was feeling guilty for pushing Paul off that mezzanine years prior. Terese ignores Paul's ex-wives and marries Paul, with Christina and Caroline Alessi (Gillian Blakeny) watching as witnesses. When Terese returns from her honeymoon, a hidden camera is found in a Lassiter's room, forcing her to briefly step down as hotel manager.

The following year, Jane Harris (Annie Jones) is catfished and Paul uses Terese's wedding vows in an apology letter, angering Terese. Her and Paul then organise a vow renewal and their marriage is put back on track. When Gary is murdered, Terese attends his funeral and helps his grieving mother. A year later, Terese announces that Lassiter's would cease Australia Day celebrations and become a supporter of the "change the date" movement. Tim Collins causes strife for her by posting an article on the West Waratah Star newspaper that features a comment Terese made five years, which countered her decision to halt celebrations. Terese meets with Indigenous councillor Jacinta Hay (Maurian Spearim) to discuss Aboriginal and Torres Strait Islander representation among Lassiter's staff. After Jacinta mentions Terese's comment from the article, Terese makes a public statement explaining how her opinion on the issue has changed since 2016.

Terese discovers that Lassiter's employee Jesse Porter (Cameron Robbie) is the son of Julie Quill and is spying for Shay Quill (Yasmin Kassim). Terese fires Jesse and orders him to stay away from her forever. However, when Terese discovers that Shay has kicked Jesse out of her business, she offers Jesse a room at Lassiter's. Terese confronts Shay and tells her that Jesse is not responsible for Julie's actions, which damaged Shay's business' reputation. Terese ultimately decides to invest in Shay's business, but later informs Shay that the investment will have to be postponed indefinitely, as Paul has personal matters to deal with. Terese learns that Jesse's birth date is Josh's original date of confinement and begins treating Jesse as her son as a way to grieve. When Jesse tells Terese that he is meeting with Julie, Terese tags along and goes to the prison to confront Julie. Jesse does not turn up to the prison, which allows Terese and Julie to talk. Julie accuses Terese of getting close to Jesse as revenge, but Terese explains that she was sympathetic for him, as Shay was using him. Terese explains that Jesse's presence makes her feel like she still has Josh with her. After Julie apologises for what she did, Terese tells her that she wants to move along with her life.

Terese finds out that Paul used his son, David Tanaka (Takaya Honda), to scare Jesse away from the prison. She also becomes aware that Paul paid David's surrogate, Nicolette Stone (Charlotte Chimes), who had run away while pregnant, one million dollars for her to give up David's baby and to never return to Erinsborough. The money Paul used is why Terese could not invest in the Quill Group. Terese receives the final blow when she discovers that Paul paid Holden Brice (Toby Derrick) to give a fake testimony against Harlow's boyfriend, Brent Colefax (Texas Watterson). Terese confronts Paul and kicks him out of the house. She later calls for a separation. Harlow gathers information off Terese twice and feeds it to Paul in an attempt to reunite the couple, but it backfires upon her when Terese finds out and kicks her out of the house as well. Terese has flashbacks of Paul's ex-wives warning her and pours herself a glass of wine. Chloe Brennan (April Rose Pengilly) stops her in time and pours the alcohol down the sink. Lucy asks Paul and Terese to present together at a Lassiter's conference in Queensland, putting further pressure on her. She relapses at the conference and is found drunk on the beach by Paul's estranged brother Glen Donnelly (Richard Huggett). Glen agrees to keep her relapse a secret and Terese finds herself romantically drawn to him.

When Paul is injured by falling debris in a storm, Terese feels she is to blame and moves back into the penthouse to aid his recovery. They share a kiss, prompting Terese to admit her feelings for Glen. Not wanting Terese to move out, Paul lies that he is seriously ill. They reconcile their marriage and plan to renew their vows, but on the day of the renewal Paul's lies are exposed and Terese ends their relationship for good. Paul is infuriated when Terese and Glen start dating and he pursues an aggressive divorce settlement from her. He also allows Terese to organise a fashion show week in full knowledge that Lassiter's partnership with Montana Marcel (Tammin Sursok) will end disastrous due to her secret financial issues. When Montana's secret is exposed, Terese is fired from the hotel. Things ease between the exes when Paul finally offers to buy Terese out of Lassiter's. Paige visits Erinsborough and expresses her doubts about Terese and Glen's relationship. When Glen asks Terese to move away from Melbourne to run a new business together, she accepts but continues to be drawn to Paul as he advances the hotel sale, with his own plans to move to New York. Terese ends things with Glen and kisses Paul, but he initially rejects her in fear that he will hurt her again. On the eve of Paul's departure, the couple finally talk and rekindle their relationship. Both Paul and Terese decide to stay in Erinsborough, with Glen departing soon after.

Two years pass in Erinsborough. Paul and Terese's relationship collapses again when he jilts her at the altar. She begins a relationship with her neighbour Toadie Rebecchi (Ryan Moloney), who has recently been left by his wife Melanie Pearson (Lucinda Cowden). They marry quickly, troubling their friends and family, although Paul does give them his blessing and attends their wedding. Toadie and his children Nell (Ayisha Salem-Towner) and Hugo (Tanner Ellis-Anderson) move into Terese's home. Whilst she welcomes her new stepchildren, Terese is unaware that Nell is scheming to reconcile Toadie and Melanie.

== Reception ==
For her portrayal of Terese, Elmaloglou was nominated for Best Daytime Star at the Inside Soap Awards in 2016 and 2017 respectively. The 2017 nomination did not progress to the viewer-voted shortlist. Elmaloglou received a nomination in the same category in 2022. In 2025, Elmaloglou received a nomination in the "Soaps - Best Actor" category the Digital Spy Reader Awards.

The character has received a mixed response from television critics. A TVTimes reporter reckoned that Elmaloglou's casting proved that there was still a shortage of actors in Australia. When Terese stated that she and Paul would make a good team, the reporter commented "You live and learn, love." Daniel Kilkelly from Digital Spy observed that Terese had received a lot of positive feedback and Elmaloglou was pleased that viewers were loving her character. A New Idea columnist thought Terese was "tough" and branded her a "feisty mum". A Sunday Mail reporter noticed "The fued [sic] between Terese and Paul shows no sign of abating as we move in to the New Year." A writer for The Sun newspaper's TV Magazine noticed that Terese was left "frustrated and helpless" during Imogen's eating disorder storyline. In February 2014, another writer for the publication stated that everyone wanted Terese to get her job back, explaining "Without her at the helm, Lassiter's is falling apart."

After Lauren revealed that she and Brad had a daughter, Laura Morgan from All About Soap said she was "pretty sure possessive Terese won't be happy about her hubby spending time with his former flame." Morgan then speculated as to whether Terese would turn to Matt for comfort, saying it would be "a brilliant twist to the tale!" Morgan later questioned Terese's personality transplant, saying "The ballsy businesswoman has always been no-nonsense and forthright (and we love her for it), but since discovering Paige is Brad's daughter she's turned into a full-on soap bitch. Terese reckons Paige is 'dangerous' – but sorry, we can't agree with her." Morgan accused Terese of being jealous and did not think her actions were for Brad's benefit at all. In August 2015, Melinda Houston of The Sydney Morning Herald observed that Terese was "often a prickly character, hard to love (her recent affair with the bottle hasn't helped) and tonight Brad puts a few things to her that are hard to refute."

In May 2016, All About Soap's Mark James Lowe praised Elmaloglou and her character, stating: "In a street occupied by saintly Susan and vanilla Lauren, we thoroughly enjoy Rebekah Elmaloglou's depiction of multi-layered Terese. Mrs Willis's grief and pain over losing son Josh has been heartbreaking – and we know it's bad, but we love when Terese gets sozzled." A Sunday Mail reporter observed that Terese was "humiliated and abandoned" following the trial, so she "hits rock bottom". Clare Rigden of the Herald Sun was excited when it appeared Paul and Terese still had feelings for one another, stating "I knew it. I blooming KNEW there was still something there between Paul and Terese." She also praised the actors, writing "Maybe its my age, but I'm loving the exploits of the older cast far more than those of the flighty youngsters. And I absolutely love seeing Rebekah Elmaloglou back on TV. She's so great. More please."

Johnathon Hughes of the Radio Times praised the character during her cancer battle, writing "Neighbours' matriarch Terese Willis is one of the toughest women Ramsay Street has ever seen, and she's certainly had to be in recent months during her brave battle with breast cancer." Hughes also dubbed her a "ballbreaking businesswoman". When Terese turned to Paul for comfort during her cancer treatment, Anna Brain of the Herald Sun quipped: "Bad news has a funny effect on people." After Paul turned down her proposal, a reporter for the Evening Chronicle stated "Terese is not the sort of woman to take rejection well". Terese was placed at number twenty on the Huffpost's "35 greatest Neighbours characters of all time" feature. Journalist Adam Beresford described her as a work driven "pocket dynamo" who was "more fun to watch" because of her "hot tempered and impulsive" love life. He added that it was evident Terese would be a show mainstay from her debut. He noted that she outlasted her entire on-screen family and became "half of an Erinsborough power couple" with Paul. Beresford concluded that Terese's alcohol story "saw her go off the rails in spectacular style." In 2021, Terese was placed seventh in a poll ran via soap fansite "Back To The Bay", which asked readers to determine the top ten most popular Neighbours characters.
