= Richard Huggett (actor) =

Australian actor (born 1965)

- Born: 3 December 1965 (age 60); Brisbane, Queensland, Australia
- Occupation: Actor
- Years active: 1988–present

Richard Huggett (born 3 December 1965) is an Australian film, television and theatre actor. After graduating from NIDA in 1988, Huggett guested in an episode of Home and Away, before he was cast as villain Sonny Bennett in E Street. Huggett's character killed four of the show's regulars, before taking his own life, bringing in strong ratings for the soap. Huggett went on to win the Logie Award for Most Popular New Talent in 1991 for his portrayal of Sonny. Huggett next played Glen Donnelly in another soap Neighbours from 1990 until 1992. He only stayed for a year, as he wanted more to pursue more demanding roles. In 1994, Huggett joined short-lived soap Paradise Beach as Sam Dexter and police drama Blue Heelers as supporting character Sean Neale. He has also made guest appearances in various television shows, including Col'n Carpenter, All Saints and Out of the Blue. He appeared in the Australian film Aiyai: Wrathful Soul in 2020 and re-joined the cast of Neighbours as Glen in 2021. In addition to his television and film work, Huggett has also appeared in a number of theatre productions.

== Early life ==
Huggett's parents emigrated to Australia from London, UK. He was born in Brisbane and holds dual Australian and British nationally.

Huggett attended the National Institute of Dramatic Art (NIDA). He appeared in a number of theatre productions as part of the graduating classes, including The Screens by Jean Genet and Fifth of July by Lanford Wilson.

== Career ==
Huggett appeared in Home and Away in 1989. Followed by a 50-word guest role in an early episode of E Street. The soap's creator Forrest Redlich spotted Huggett in a production of A Midsummer Night's Dream, and later cast him in the main role of villain Sonny Bennett. Sonny was introduced as the "bad seed" brother of Lisa Bennett (played by Alyssa-Jane Cook) at a time when the storylines were becoming darker in order to keep the show's male audience interested. Sonny had been to prison for robbery, took drugs, and tried to kill Constable Max Simmons (Bruce Samazan). In his final months, Sonny killed four main characters and then himself, which was a critical and ratings success for E Street. For his performance as Sonny, Huggett won the Logie Award for Most Popular New Talent in 1991. He also received a nomination for the Logie Award for Most Popular Actor in Australia.

Following his departure from E Street, Huggett joined the cast of Neighbours as Glen Donnelly, the illegitimate son of Jim Robinson (Alan Dale). Huggett had to relocate from Sydney to Melbourne for the role, which negatively impacted his personal life. He was branded the show's new "heart-throb" by the press. During his time in the show, Glen had an incestuous relationship with his half-sister Lucy Robinson (Melissa Bell). Scenes featuring the pair together was edited for broadcast by the BBC in the UK. In September 1991, Chrissie Camp of TV Week confirmed that Huggett had decided to quit Neighbours and not renew his one-year contract, which ran out in November. Huggett stated that a year was enough and, while he enjoyed playing Glen, he wanted more demanding roles. He would later say that he was bored in the role, which he felt was going nowhere.

While he was appearing in Neighbours, Huggett made a guest appearance in an episode of Col'n Carpenter. Huggett later admitted that he was not comfortable with the level of fame he received from his two biggest roles. The day after he finished up on Neighbours, Huggett and his long-term partner Myriam Loda left Australia for Europe and the Middle East. Upon returning home, Huggett struggled to find acting work and they went to the UK. He appeared in various theatre productions in England, including Anzacs Over England at the Swan Theatre, and the pantomime Sleeping Beauty in Leeds in December 1992. Huggett and Loda married in January 1993 and returned to Australia in November that same year.

In 1994, Huggett joined the Nine Network soap opera Paradise Beach in the six-week role of Sam Dexter, a love interest for Kimberley Joseph's character Cassie Barsby. He was billed as "An enigmatic – and dangerous – professional protester, Dexter is the kind of man who travels the world looking for lost causes." Kevin Sadler of The Sydney Morning Herald noted that while Sam would call himself an "environmental crusader", Paradise Beach viewers would soon describe him as a "terrorist". That same year, he appeared in Blue Heelers as Sean Neale. Huggett called his character "very methodical and logical". He enjoyed working on Blue Heelers, saying "it forces you to think a bit. After working for so long on soaps, these scripts are amazing." In 1996, Huggett starred in a production of James McLure's Lone Star at the Belvoir Downstairs.

Huggett later chose to step back from his acting career and he became a shearer in New South Wales. He has also worked as a personal trainer and a truck driver, before relocating to Brisbane and working for an events company. He appeared in All Saints in the early 2000s, and the Australian soap opera Out of the Blue in 2008. Huggett had a supporting role in Home and Away in 2012, as Gary Reed. In 2017, Huggett had a small guest role in the Nine Network miniseries House of Bond. The following year, he starred in an advertisement campaign for the Brisbane Broncos. Two years later, Huggett appeared in the Australian mystery thriller film Aiyai: Wrathful Soul.

Huggett re-joined the cast of Neighbours in 2021. He told Fiona Byrne of the Herald Sun that it felt like he was coming home and he was looking forward to "the twists and turns ahead" for Glen. Glen's storylines included reuniting with his half-brother and his daughter, as well as a relationship with Terese Willis (Rebekah Elmaloglou). Huggett remained with the serial until its cancellation in 2022. Huggett confirmed that he had been attending auditions for new roles and planning his move back to Brisbane. In 2023, Huggett made a guest appearance in NCIS: Sydney.

== Filmography ==
Film performances
Year	Title	Role	Notes
1989	Slipstream	Emery	
1997	Mr. Nice Guy	Giancarlo's Man	
1998	Babe: Pig in the City	Cop	
2003	Spoon Man	Stranger in Bar	Short film
2007	Gabriel	Max	
2008	Bella	Sandman	Short film
2015	Infini	Montoli	
2020	Aiyai: Wrathful Soul	Albert Fisher	

Television performances
Year	Title	Role	Notes
1989	E Street	Gil	Episode: "An Ounce of Prevention, Part 1"
1989	Home and Away	Chas	Guest role
1990–1991	E Street	Sonny Bennett	Main cast
1990–1992, 2021–2022	Neighbours	Glen Donnelly	Main cast
1991	Col'n Carpenter	Fantasy Man	Episode: "The Sacred Blurr"
1993	Paradise Beach	Sam Dexter	Main cast
1994	Blue Heelers	Sean Neale	Recurring role
1995	The Ferals	Scott Scotman	Episode: "Feral TV"
1998	Murder Call	Peter Delaney	Episode: "Fatal Charm"
2002	All Saints	Murray McAllister	Episode: "Swept Away"
2005	All Saints	Greg Cato	Episode: "Life's Lottery"
2008	Out of the Blue	Jeremy Piper	Episode: "Blood Alley"
2009	Rescue: Special Ops	Steve	Episode: "Building Site"
2010	The Pacific	Major Coyle	Episode: "Peleliu Airfield"
2012	Home and Away	Gary Reed	Recurring role
2017	House of Bond	Maitre'd	Miniseries
2023	NCIS: Sydney	Asessor	Guest role
