= Andrew Williams (actor) =

Welsh-Australian actor and musician

- Born: 1962 or 1963 (age 62–63); Llwynypia, Wales
- Occupations: Actor; Dharma teacher; Musician
- Years active: 1991–1999, 2015 (acting)

Andrew Williams is a Welsh-Australian actor and musician. Williams began performing and writing music in his teens, before forming a band and later embarking on a solo career. He was also a model and appeared in a number of television commercials, before he was cast as Guy Carpenter in the television soap opera Neighbours in 1991. His character was introduced amidst a decline in ratings. Williams chose to leave after a year, as he felt his character was not going anywhere and he wanted to continue pursuing a career in music. Williams reprised the role for a guest appearance in March 2015. After Neighbours, Williams joined E Street as Jack Brown, the "bad boy" brother of Reverend Bob (Tony Martin). He had to relocate to Sydney for the role. After the cancellation of E Street in 1993, Williams moved to Los Angeles and joined the supporting cast of Melrose Place as fashion buyer Chris Marchette. He also guested in episodes of Everybody Loves Raymond and Acapulco H.E.A.T., as well as self appearances in Burke's Backyard and Club Buggery. Williams stopped his acting career in 1998 in order to focus on his Dharma studies and his music career. He became a Dharma teacher and a Buddhist prison chaplain.

== Early life ==
Williams was born at Glyncornel, Llwynypia to Kay and Bill. The family left Wales when Williams was six years old and they eventually settled in Australia. His parents lived on Phillip Island, Victoria. Williams was given his first guitar by his parents when he was 10 years old, and he began performing as a singer when he was 15. Four years later, Williams began a modelling career, which saw him travel around the world on assignments. He also set up a band called New York Classique and they played venues in Melbourne and Sydney. When the band broke up two years later, Williams gained a positive reputation as a solo performer.

== Career ==
Williams first appeared in a number of television commercials. His prominence as a musician led to his casting as Guy Carpenter in the television soap opera Neighbours despite his lack of acting experience. He joined the cast after failing to secure a record contract, and said that he almost rejected the role, as he was "still in music mode". His character was one of three created as part of a large revamp of the serial, which had seen a large decline in ratings and a number of other characters written out. Guy was introduced as Erinsborough's new recreational officer. Not long after joining Neighbours, Williams decided to leave in order to continue pursuing a career in music. Williams later said that Neighbours had been learning opportunity for him, but his character did not seem to be going anywhere. Williams would later reprise the role for a guest appearance during the show's 30th anniversary in March 2015.

After leaving Neighbours, Williams joined the main cast of fellow soap opera E Street mid-1992 as Jack Brown. Williams had to relocate from Melbourne to Sydney for the role. Billed as a "bad boy", Jack was Reverend Bob's (Tony Martin) estranged brother and recently released from prison. Williams spoke out about younger viewers idolising his character, who was known for his heavy drinking and chain smoking. Tierri Abraham of TV Soap reported that Williams was "mobbed" by children in shopping centres, as they thought Jack was "cool". However, Williams did not want them to hero worship his character and revealed that the cigarettes he had to smoke contained very little tobacco and the scotch Jack drinks was actually cold tea. For his work in E Street, Williams was included on the longlist for Most Popular Actor at the 1993 Logie Awards.

In December 1992, Williams appeared in his first pantomime – Snow White and the Seven Dwarfs – at The Sands Centre in Carlisle. The following month, he began a supporting role as Mick in R.F.D.S.. From 20 December 1993 until 9 January 1994, he starred alongside fellow soap actors Aidan Brosnan and Rebekah Elmaloglou in a production of Aladdin and his Wonderful Lamp at Leicester's De Montfort Hall, where he played the role of the Chinese Policeman.

When E Street was cancelled, Williams moved to Los Angeles in late 1993 to focus on his acting career. Within six weeks, he was cast in the recurring role of Chris Marchette in Melrose Place, after impressing producer Aaron Spelling. Williams said that he worked hard at securing a job and attended acting classes instead of bars and parties. His character is an Australian fashion buyer, who becomes a love interest for series regular Jane Mancini (Josie Bissett). He told Jim Schembri of The Age that the role initially had him playing "the charming guy", with another actor playing a "bad guy", however, the producers realised that he could play both. While he was in LA, Williams auditioned to play James Bond in a future film, but as he was 28 years old at the time, he was considered too young for the role. He also signed a recording deal during his time in LA. He was to work with music producer Trevor Veitch to make his first album in January 1996. He also planned to make his action film debut which would make use of his martial arts skills.

In April 1995, Williams was the celebrity gardener on Burke's Backyard. Later that year, he appeared on car show Behind the Wheel in which he showed presenter James Morrison around his garage, and he was a guest on Club Buggery. In 1997, Williams guested in an episode of Everybody Loves Raymond. He also appeared in an episode of Acapulco H.E.A.T.. A long-term practitioner of Tibetan Buddhism, Williams chose to stop his acting career in 1998 in order to focus on his Dharma studies and his music career. He has created a number of annual Vesak musicals and Buddhist music albums. He is also a Dharma teacher and a Buddhist prison chaplain at Fulham Correctional Centre.

== Personal life ==
Williams studied martial arts from the age of 10 and practised tai chi and meditation.

Williams married his then partner, a former model, when he was 20 years old, but it ended in divorce. He was in a relationship with actress Melissa Thomas in the early 1990s. They lived together in Sydney, where Williams was working on E Street. Their relationship faced scrutiny from the media and public because of the nine year age gap between them. They became engaged after Williams proposed in early 1993, and they planned to marry in March 1994. However, they ended their engagement in late 1993, so Williams could relocate to the United States to further his acting career.

Williams made a permanent return to Australia in the early 2000s to be closer to his parents.

== Filmography ==
Year	Title	Role	Notes
1991–1992, 2015	Neighbours	Guy Carpenter	Main cast
1992–1993	E Street	Jack Brown	Main cast
1993–1994	R.F.D.S.	Mick the Accountant	Recurring
1994	Melrose Place	Chris Marchette	Recurring
1997	Everybody Loves Raymond	Cool Guy	Episode: "High School"
1999	Acapulco H.E.A.T.	Keith McHenry	Episode: "Code Name: Juice"
