= Aiyai: Wrathful Soul =

- Film poster
- Directed by: Ilanthirayan Alan Arumugam
- Screenplay by: Ilanthirayan Alan Arumugam; Charles Benedict; Mukund Ramanan
- Story by: Ilanthirayan Alan Arumugam
- Starring: Kabir Singh; Tahlia Jade Holt; Pennyanne Lace
- Cinematography: Damien Beebe
- Edited by: Roberto Merlini
- Music by: Jason Fernandez
- Production companies: Aiyai Pty Ltd; GVKM Elephant Pictures
- Release date: 28 February 2020
- Country: Australia
- Language: English

Aiyai: Wrathful Soul is a 2020 Australian psychological, supernatural, mystery thriller directed by Ilanthirayan Alan Arumugam in his directorial debut while the script was made alongside Mukund Ramanad and Charles Benedict. The film was produced by Kanesh Mohana Sundaram of Aiyai Pty Ltd. The film premiered on 28 February 2020.

== Premise ==
Kiran, an Indian student living in Australia, becomes a medium to exist for a vengeful spirit of a homeless woman. Kiran gets visions of many things he cannot understand, and the spirit inside him uses Kiran to fulfill its vengeance.

== Cast ==
- Kabir Singh as Kiran
- Tahlia Jade Holt as Sara Martin
- Korey Williams as Steve Lewis
- Anthony Miller as Police Officer #1
- Salvatore Merenda as Dave
- Vinod Mohana Sundaram as Felix
- Richard Huggett as Albert Fisher
- Marco Sinigaglia as Willy
- Rhiannon Watson as Young lady
- Pennyanne Lace as Amy
- Ozzie Devrish as Tom
- Craig Ingham as Michael
- Asabi Goodman as Police woman
- Wayne Bassett as Sammy Green
- Pearl Grantham as Restaurant customer
- Graceyn Arkinstall as Waitress
- William Wensley as Darren
- Alex Contis as Restaurant customer
- Ged Maybury as Old man
- Vicky Loughrey as Elise Blake
- Therese Westbrook as Michelle Simms
- Jack McGuigan as Chef Jack
- Duzgun Ozturk as Chef Tony
- Jessica Berry as Restaurant customer

== Production ==
Kabir Singh plays the role of the protagonist, Damien Beebe handles cinematography, and production design is by Tim Hodgman. Editing and sound design is by Roberto Merlini and the music is composed by Jason Fernandez. The film was entirely filmed in Australia.
