= Lucy Robinson (Neighbours) =

Fictional character from Neighbours

- Neighbours character
- Melissa Bell as Lucy (2013)
- Portrayed by: Kylie Flinker (1985–1987); Sasha Close (1987–1989); Melissa Bell (1991–2025)
- Duration: 1985–1989, 1991–1993, 1995, 2005, 2013–2016, 2020–2025
- First appearance: 18 March 1985
- Last appearance: 26 August 2025
- Created by: Reg Watson
- Introduced by: Reg Watson (1985); Don Battye (1991); Ian Bradley (1993); Bill Searle (1995); Ric Pellizzeri (2005); Richard Jasek (2013); Jason Herbison (2020)
In-universe information
- Occupation: Student; Model; Businesswoman; Owner of Lassiters Hotel chain
- Family: Robinson
- Father: Jim Robinson
- Mother: Anne Robinson
- Brothers: Paul Robinson; Scott Robinson
- Half-brothers: Glen Donnelly
- Half-sisters: Julie Martin; Jill Ramsay
- Husband: David Kazalian (1993–1995); Mark Gottlieb (2020–)
- Daughters: Annie Robinson-Pappas
- Grandmothers: Helen Daniels; Bess Robinson
- Aunts: Rosemary Daniels
- Nephews: Daniel Robinson; Andrew Robinson; David Tanaka; Leo Tanaka
- Nieces: Amy Williams; Elle Robinson; Kate Ramsay; Sophie Ramsay; Madison Robinson; Kiri Durant
- Other relatives: Hilary Robinson; Matt Robinson; Gwen Simpson; Laura Dennison; Nikki Dennison; Wayne Duncan; Harlow Robinson; Jimmy Williams; Isla Tanaka-Brennan; Abigail Tanaka

Lucy Robinson is a fictional character from the Australian soap opera Neighbours, played by Melissa Bell. The character has previously been portrayed by Kylie Flinker and Sasha Close. She was created by producer Reg Watson as one of the serial's original characters. Lucy was a prominent figure during the early 1990s of Neighbours, with Bell playing her on and off for five years. Portrayed originally as being clever, a recast was implemented to fit the character's transformation and she became the stereotype of a ditzy blonde female. She has been involved in storylines including battling a brain tumour, coping with blindness, incest, modelling and addictions to drugs, alcohol and spending. She has also been positively and negatively received by critics for her "busty blonde" image while played by Bell.

After making a brief return on 6 May 2013, Lucy made subsequent return visits until 2016. She was reintroduced as part of the serial's 35th anniversary in 2020, before returning briefly in late 2021 as part of the reintroduction of her half-brother, Glen Donnelly (Richard Huggett), and twice in 2022, appearing in the show's finale episode. Bell returned on 18 September 2023 following the show's renewal, but departed again on 21 September 2023. Bell returned again on 13 February 2024 for three episodes centric to David Tanaka's (Takaya Honda) death and left again on 15 February 2024. She again returned on 21 August 2025, to help Lassiters win the Bronze Bell Prize.

== Casting ==
Lucy was created by Reg Watson as a young child, to help the serial appeal to all ages. She was originally played by Kylie Flinker, who had no prior acting experience when she auditioned for the role. Flinker was cast as Lucy after impressing in an emotional scene in which she had to cry. Flinker's departure from the serial was publicised in the 8 November 1986 edition of TV Week. Patrice Fidgeon reported that Flinker would not be renewing her contract and would finish at the end of the year, with her final scenes airing around March 1987. Flinker decided to leave Neighbours to return to school, having worked with various tutors while on set and attending special classes during filming breaks. Fidgeon said Lucy would likely be written out by being sent to visit her friend Bradley Townsend (Bradley Kilpatrick) in Paris. Fidgeon also confirmed that the character of Lucy would continue to be seen as the role was going to be recast.

Sasha Close was cast as the second Lucy upon Flinker's departure. Close said she was very lucky to get the part, which she agreed to film on a recurring basis until she was in her final year of school. In December 1990, Jodie Brockwell of TV Week reported that the character had been recast once more after producers decided Lucy would return on a permanent basis. Brockwell confirmed that former E Street regular Melissa Bell had been cast in the role. Bell had to relocate from the NSW Central Coast to Melbourne for filming, which began on 21 January 1991. She made her first appearance as Lucy in April. Lucy became one of the show's central characters in the year Bell featured regularly.

== Development ==
=== Characterisation ===
"I love my character Lucy. She's so strong and stands up for what she believes in. Some of the soap characters around are far too wimpy and not feisty enough."

— Bell on Lucy's personality. (1993)

While played by Flinker, Lucy was described as being an innocent child who never does any wrong. Margaret Koppe of TV Radio Extra said Lucy was "a nice, normal little girl of nine" who looks up to her older sister Julie Robinson (Vikki Blanche), although she sometimes prefers "rough and tumble fun with her brothers." A writer for the Neighbours Pocket Trivia Book noted that Lucy has her "fair share of adventures" while growing up on-screen. She is Jim Robinson's (Alan Dale) "spoiled little girl" and behaves "terrible" towards her father's girlfriend Zoe Davis (Ally Fowler) taping "ugly threats" from television shows and playing them over the phone to scare Zoe. She is also a "disobedient snooper" and causes trouble for Rosemary Daniels (Joy Chambers) by exposing letters sent from her ex-fiancé Gerard Singer (Bryan Marshall) and mother Helen Daniels' (Anne Haddy), confessing their love. But Lucy does have "a good side" to her curiosity; for instance she helps the police catch the culprit of a robbery that occurs at Clive Gibbons' (Geoff Paine) house. Flinker said she shared some similarities with Lucy, but she liked to let her hair down and was more of a tomboy.

The character's return in 1991 occurs after she is sent home from her "elite" boarding school to face the "wrath" of her father. Her grandmother Helen takes pity on her and persuades Jim to let her finish her schooling in Erinsborough. In her teenage years, Lucy was described as giving her father plenty of reasons to worry, going from one dead-end job to the next and being incredibly flirtatious. During the character's return in 2005, Bell spoke with Neil Wilkes of Digital Spy about how Lucy has grown up and learned from her mistakes, changing from a rebellious young woman into a clever business woman, stating: "I started in 1990 and I've come back many times, the last about eight years ago. Now I'd describe Lucy as a centered woman with her life together, very focused on her business. But she probably yearns for a family and for love. Just growing up does that to people. She's grown from her early twenties to her late twenties, and she's very different to when she was at earlier stages of her life." She also made light of the fact that Lucy has Robinson qualities and can be a bit ruthless at times. A Channel 5 writer described Lucy as a feisty character who is often embroiled in the dramas surrounding her corrupt brother, Paul (Stefan Dennis).

=== Drink driving ===
Lucy had often been portrayed as an immature and spoilt character. But a car accident forces her to reevaluate her life choices. Lucy gets drunk following an argument with Jim and attempts to drive home. With Brad Willis (Scott Michaelson) as her passenger she crashes the car into a lake. Bell told an Inside Soap reporter that Lucy behaves without thinking, then cannot concentrate while being "all over the place". The actress did not drive the car into the lake. But she and Michaelson did film in the lake on a night shoot. They were given belts to keep them floating in scenes. However the belts only managed to drag them down into the surface mud below. On-screen Lucy faces the consequence of her ordeal and as Bell stated; "this is the incident that really shakes her, she realises that she could have killed someone, and that really makes her stop and think." She believed that her fictional counterpart's story would help viewers to be vigilant about driving under the influence of alcohol.

=== Departure and 1993 return ===
In 1992 Bell quit her role as Lucy in order to host a chat show, of her exit she revealed she was sad to leave but the producers decided to leave the door open for her to return in the future, already having agreed to return to filming in 1993 for a three-episode stint especially for the 2000th episode of Neighbours. Lucy's departure storyline played her deciding to take a modelling job in Singapore. Bell explained [to an Inside Soap reporter] that "I think that was what she originally said she wanted to do, and then she went through about sixteen career changes before landing that particular job." Bell kept her promise and Lucy appeared again in 1993. The return sees Lucy attend her grandmother Helen 's birthday party. But she also announces that she has married her agent, David Kazalian (Frankie J. Holden). Bell told from Inside Soap that "Lucy hasn't taken the very conventional route in her life so far. She's been off around the world modelling and she fell in love with the man who looked after her." Lucy's family are not impressed with her new marriage. Helen becomes worried as she thinks that they behave in a cold manner around each other. Bell described David as "not the warmest of men" and they do not spend much time "canoodling". Bell was happy to reprise the role because Lucy is "fun" and "very versatile" character.

=== 1995 return ===
In 1995, Bell returned to Neighbours for three months. Bell wrote a letter to the then story editor with suggestions on how Lucy could return. Delighted with her ideas they telephoned her to discuss Lucy's imminent comeback. The storyline saw Mark Gottlieb (Bruce Samazan) find her working as a go-go dancer in "a seedy strip joint". He took her back to her family, whereupon Lucy revealed that her marriage to David had broken down and her dreams of becoming a model had been "shattered". She then became desperate and began dancing to make money. Lucy moved back in with her family, but her problems did not end. Bell told Victoria Ross from Inside Soap "She starts taking drugs and drinking heavily, but because it's Neighbours you won't see too much slurring or staggering about!"

=== 20th anniversary return ===
In 2005 Neighbours celebrated its 20th anniversary; Bell along with numerous other past cast members had been asked to return. Her return was later confirmed and it was stated that she would re-appear towards the end of 2005. Bell has stated that producers approached her with a proposal to return six months prior to filming. During an interview with media reporting website Digital Spy, Bell was asked what it was like playing Lucy after two previous actresses had taken the role; she replied: "It was really easy because I took over the character when she left boarding school and was grown up. I started when I was 18, and looked at old tapes to see her character and her relationships." In another interview Bell said: "I love Lucy so much. She is so me. I played Lucy at such a young age; only 18 years old. So playing her at 32 was wonderful for me, as she had changed so much over the years. Bell told Herbison of All About Soap that Lucy returns to Ramsay Street to visit Paul. She wants to help him reconnect with his family and change his life following an accident.

=== 2013 return ===
"I think Neighbours is focusing on bringing back some familiar faces as well as a family atmosphere. The Robinsons are crucial to Neighbours and Lucy is integral to the show – she was a big part of everything back in the day. I still get recognised as Lucy Robinson when I'm walking down the street!"

— Bell on why it was the right time to return.

In May 2010, Bell told Jason Herbison [interviewing then for Inside Soap] that she wanted to return to Neighbours and that Lucy was her "best friend". She noted that a return would be viable because of Paul's presence and suggested that Lucy could control and expand Lassiters. On 14 March 2013, it was announced that Bell had reprised her role and would be returning to Neighbours. Bell filmed her scenes a few weeks prior to the announcement and was on-screen for two weeks from 6 May. She told Thomas Mitchell from TV Week that her first day back on set was not as strange as she had thought it would be and she had enjoyed stepping back into Lucy's shoes, especially as the character is in control of her life. Bell admitted that despite being the third actress to play Lucy, she felt like she owned the character. She said "I've played the character since I was 17 [now aged 40], so I took her from a young woman to a mature adult business-woman. I've always loved the character and it was really fun for me to come back and revisit Lucy."

Lucy's return coincided with a storyline involving her brother Paul and a "crucial time" in his life. Bell stated that she was glad Paul was always up to something as it made for an interesting storyline. Lucy has become the head of Lassiter's Worldwide and she returns to sort out the corruption and bribery that has taken place. On Paul's reaction to Lucy's visit, Bell stated "Paul and Lucy have always had a close relationship. She's looked up to him over the years and she'll always be his little sister. But, now she's the boss, overruling him and he doesn't like it. They get along at first, but just how long will that last?" Lucy fires a lot of Lassiter's staff and she is "astonished" to learn how Paul's been running the business. Bell added that Lucy is not married and is very focused on her career. She is "more assertive than she used to be" and has learnt a lot. While she is in town, Lucy also becomes keen to meet her niece, Kate Ramsay (Ashleigh Brewer), for the first time. During an August interview with Kylie Gillies and Larry Emdur from The Morning Show, Bell revealed that she would be returning to Neighbours again. Lucy's return was a factor in Bell's personal decision to lose weight via a gastric balloon. She returned on 5 December 2013. Series producer Jason Herbison indicated that Lucy would continue to appear in the show and described her as "part of the extended Neighbours family".

=== Further returns (2014–present) ===
Lucy returned again in July 2014, and as part of the show's 30th anniversary in March 2015. On 6 November 2015, Lucy and Chris Pappas (James Mason) made a cameo appearance to announce the birth of their daughter. In June 2016, Dennis revealed that Bell had been filming more appearances as Lucy.

Bell reprised the role for the show's 35th anniversary celebrations in 2020. She was pleased with Lucy's return storyline and how the character had grown since she was last on screen, calling it "brilliant". She teased, "For Lucy, it will be a full circle for her which I'm really excited about. It's more a nervous energy, I just want to get back into and I feel I know the character so well now, it's great to see what is in store for her this time around." Lucy returns on 18 February 2020, as she comes to Erinsborough to check up on new general manager of Lassiters, Chloe Brennan (April Rose Pengilly).

Bell reprised the role in 2021, as Lucy reconnects with her half-brother Glen Donnelly. Bell told Inside Soap's Sarah Ellis that she was excited when she learned that Glen was returning and even more so when she found out that Huggett was reprising the role. She stated "I hadn't seen Richard for over 20 years, but once we got back on set with Stefan [Dennis, who plays Paul], it was as if no time had passed at all. Richard is as lovely as ever, it was just like the old days!" Bell explained that initially Lucy does not believe Paul when he tells her that he saw Glen, as she thinks it is one of his "schemes". However, when she and Glen reunite, Lucy learns that he had wanted to reconnect for a while and has been following her career online. Bell said Lucy plays "peacemaker" between the siblings so there is not any awkwardness. She continued: "She thinks it's great that Glen is back in their lives. But for Paul it's more about making peace with the past, and his regrets about how it's taken all these years for them to reconnect. He knows it's what their dad Jim would have wanted." Bell also confirmed that Lucy's return is brief, but she would love a longer stint in the future.

Bell announced her return to the role in March 2022. This stint sees Lucy forced to fire Terese Willis (Rebekah Elmaloglou) from Lassiter's following the Lassiter's Fashion Week disaster. When Neighbours was cancelled, Bell returned for the show's finale episodes. In the storyline, Lucy tried to convince Paul to get together with Terese. In February 2023, it was announced that Bell would reprise the role once again in Amazon Freevee's relaunch series for another guest stint. In February 2024, Bell reprised the role for the funeral of Lucy's nephew, David Tanaka (Takaya Honda). Lucy return ed once again in 2025, Bell's return was revealed in backstage video content. Digital Spy eventually revealed in August 2025 revealed that Lucy would come back to Erinsborough during a Lassiters exhibition to win the Bronze Bell, additionally revealing that Paul will attempt to hid his embezzlements with her.

== Storylines ==
=== 1985–1989 ===
Lucy's mother Anne died giving birth to her and she was raised by her father Jim and her beloved grandmother, Helen. Lucy grows up to be a mischievous, yet intelligent little girl, who has great fun with her brothers, loves her grandmother and father, and enjoy plays with her dog Basil. Lucy is the flower-girl at her older brother Paul's wedding to Terry Inglis (Maxine Klibingaitis). Lucy falls down a drain and is trapped for many days. She is eventually found, but is left temporarily blinded by the incident. Lucy's good friend Bradley Townsend (Bradley Kilpatrick) leaves to go to Europe with his mother Andrea (Gina Gaigalas) and her new partner, Jack Lassiter (Alan Hopgood) and Lucy promises to visit him. During a trip to the beach, Basil falls into the water and drowns. Lucy is devastated by the incident, but her brother Scott's (Jason Donovan) friend Mike Young (Guy Pearce), who had failed to save Basil, tries to cheer her up by getting her a new puppy, Bouncer, whom Lucy comes to adore.

Lucy leaves to visit Bradley for several months. Upon her return, Lucy's (now Close) mood and attitude noticeably change, which annoys her family and friends. Lucy then organises a dinner party but none of her guests arrive. Realising her attitude has alienated her friends, Lucy changes her ways and soon fits in. She attends both of her brothers' weddings. However, Lucy's behaviour becomes strange when she lets Bouncer off his leash while walking him, and is later dropped from the netball team, and generally become forgetful and clumsy. Nobody can figure out what is going until Scott tries to wake Lucy from a nap but is unable to. Lucy is rushed to hospital, where it is discovered she has a large brain tumour. The Robinsons are worried but remain hopeful and the surgery is a success. During her stay in hospital, Lucy meets Rick Hansen (Dominic McDonald), a fellow patient around her age and they become friends after a difficult start. When Lucy finds the nurses stripping Rick's bed, she assumes he has died and is left devastated but Rick reappears and tells her he is being discharged and invites her to join him in the country over the holidays, which she accepts.

Lucy attends Jim's wedding to her much loved doctor, Beverly Marshall (Lisa Armytage). On the same day, Paul and his wife Gail renew their vows and Lucy meets her new step-cousins Todd (Kristian Schmid) and Katie Landers (Sally Jensen). There is a difficult adjustment period due to the Landers' children's home life being chaotic but the three of them get along. Lucy, after passing an entrance exam, is sent off to the Alumwood boarding school. When she returns for the Christmas holidays, she finds herself at odds with Sharon Davies (Jessica Muschamp) when she flirts with her boyfriend Nick Page (Mark Stevens), which results in an angry Sharon pushing Lucy into the pond at Lassiter's. Following the holidays, Lucy finds herself accused of cheating, facing expulsion. The truth is revealed when Todd tracks down Carolyn Woodhouse (Laura Christie), Lucy's classmate, who she agreed to take the blame for and urges her to confess. Carolyn then owns up and Lucy is exonerated. On Lucy's next visit, problems arise when Jim and Beverly find contraceptive pills in her bag and matters are not helped when Lucy and Nick begin dating. One such incident has them being caught at the Waterhole for being under age. After several arguments, Lucy agrees to go and stay with Julie and her family over the next few holidays.

=== 1991–1995 ===
Lucy (now played by Bell) returns to Ramsay Street permanently. Upon her return, she is different than she was before she had departed. The high-level intellectual was gone, replaced by a stereotypical blond bimbo bombshell. Following her expulsion from Alumwood, she re-enrols at Erinsborough High to complete Year Twelve. During this time, she is constantly battling the unrequited affections of Todd's friend Josh Anderson (Jeremy Angerson), but she is more interested in Glen Donnelly, despite knowing that he is her half-brother. The pair prepare to have sex, but are caught by Paul. He tells Jim, who is disbelieving at first, accusing Paul of lying, however, Helen confirms this is the truth. After a few arguments, the family agrees to move forward. Lucy then confesses to Glen's ex-girlfriend, Gemma Ramsay (Beth Buchanan) who then slaps her. Scenes showing Lucy and Glen's relationship were edited out and cut by the BBC in their UK airing.

Lucy's relationship with lifelong friend Emma Gordon (Tamsin West) comes to an end when Lucy betrays her in the race for a job for an advertising agency by passing Emma's work off as her own. Lucy goes out with neighbour Brad Willis and crashes a car into a lake. Further dramas ensue when Ashley Denton (Steve Kidd) begins stalking Lucy and kidnaps her after she twists her ankle. Ashley is convinced Lucy is a woman named Claire and forces her to try on a wedding dress. Josh comes looking for Lucy but Ashley lies and tells him she has not seen her then slams the door. Lucy tries to escape, but Ashley ties her to a chair. Josh finds one of Lucy's earrings outside and returns and forces his way into the house, knocking Ashley out and rescuing Lucy, who is grateful to him. At Christmas, Lucy, Josh and Brad go on holiday to the Gold Coast where she meets a new friend, Beth Brennan (Natalie Imbruglia) who returns to Ramsay Street with them. Lucy and Beth share a room, but tension is visible when both find themselves competing for Brad's affections. Lucy later leaves for Singapore after securing a year-long contract. She makes a brief return the following year to celebrate Helen's birthday. During this visit, Lucy reveals to her family that she has married her agent David Kazalian.

Lucy reappears two years later when Mark Gottlieb discovers her working as a go go dancer. He coaxes her back to Ramsay Street when he informs her of Julie's death the previous year, which Lucy is shocked to learn about as nobody had told her as her family could not get in contact with her. Lucy returns to her family, but there is something amiss. Local kid Toadfish Rebecchi (Ryan Moloney) and Lucy's niece, Hannah Martin (Rebecca Ritters) discover a pornography magazine, which features Lucy as the centrefold. Lucy confesses to her grandmother, Helen, that she had a serious drug and alcohol problem and that she has divorced David. Helen tells her she is only disappointed that she did not come home for help earlier. Lucy gets the help she needs with the support of her family and Mark. Lucy makes life difficult for Cody Willis who is living with her family and makes her move out and finds it difficult for her brother-in-law Phil going out with Jen.

Lucy goes to her GP for a repeat prescription for anti-depressants, but Dr Karl wants to know some history. He wants to call her doctor, but Lucy puts him off. Karl says in that case, he'll have to start from the beginning and give Lucy a proper medical. Lucy gets angry saying that she just wants the pills. Karl says he has to be careful because the pills are addictive. A few weeks later, Lucy applies for a job on reception at the GP but Dr Karl turns her down due to her drinking problem it would not be good until she is clean. Lucy attends Helen's wedding to Reuben White (James Condon) and serves as her bridesmaid.

Lucy and Mark become close and eventually kiss and sleep together after celebrating Lucy and David's divorce. Mark is unsure he wants a relationship, as he still wants to become a priest. Aunt Rosemary is back in Australia and offers Lucy a job in New York. Mark tells Lucy he would like to make a go of things, but Lucy tells Mark it is too late and departs Ramsay Street again to work for Rosemary in New York.

=== 2005– ===
Ten years later, after returning to Erinsborough Paul is injured and has to have his leg amputated. Lucy returns to Australia to support him through his ordeal. She also stays to watch Annalise Hartman's (Kimberley Davies) documentary about Ramsay Street. Lucy is now a successful business woman, like her brother. She soon returns to the United States.

After another eight years, Lucy returns to Erinsborough. She reveals to Paul that she is the new head of Lassiters Worldwide and has come to sort out his life and the business. Lucy catches up with Lauren Carpenter (Kate Kendall), who has since returned to Erinsborough with her family, and meets her niece, Kate Ramsay. Just before she leaves, Lucy hires her ex-boyfriend Brad's (now played by Kip Gamblin) wife, Terese Willis, to be the new general manager of Lassiters. Lucy returns to Erinsborough at Terese's request to help solve problems with Paul. He informs her that he intends to remove the hotel from Lassiter's chain. Lauren then confides in Lucy that she left Ramsay Street pregnant with Brad's child. Lucy encourages Lauren to tell Brad about her pregnancy, before she leaves town. When Lucy returns, she learns that Terese has quit Lassiter's. Lucy asks Lauren for her help in catering a charity event. She also expresses her worries that Lauren has not dealt with losing her baby and tells Lauren that she needs closure. Paul informs Lucy that he has offered the management of Lassiter's to his children, but she tells him that they will not accept the offer. Lucy is proved right and Paul is disappointed, so she takes him to Ramsay Street and gets him to open up to her. Paul tells Lucy that he is not happy with her becoming his superior. Lucy is relieved when Paul decides not to leave the Lassiter's chain and reinstates Terese.

After learning from her nephew, Daniel (Tim Phillipps), that Paul is depressed following Kate's death, Lucy returns to help him. Lucy is evasive when she is questioned about her time in New York, and when she drops her bag, a pregnancy testing kit falls out. Lucy snaps at Paul when he says some insensitive things to her and she confides in Lauren about her failed relationship with a colleague and her negative pregnancy test. Lucy and Paul apologise to each other and they visit Kate's grave with Daniel. Lucy befriends Chris Pappas and after they babysit Nell Rebecchi (Scarlett Anderson) together, Lucy asks him to father her child. Chris asks to think about it some more and he agrees to give Lucy a definite answer by the end of the year. Lucy returns to town for Paul's birthday, and she meets with Chris and his boyfriend Nate Kinski (Meyne Wyatt). Chris tells Lucy that he cannot father a child with her as too much as changed since she asked him, including his brain injury and his relationship status, however he later changes his mind. Paul tells Lucy that there should be a written contract, specifying Chris's rights over the baby, and Lucy and Chris draw one up. When they learn that they are both carriers of spinal muscular atrophy, Chris tells Lucy that she should find another donor. Lucy plans to use sperm from a Danish donor, but the thawing process destroys the sample and Lucy gives up hope of becoming a mother. When Chris sees how down Lucy is, he changes his mind and they go ahead with the insemination, before Lucy leaves. A couple of weeks later, Lucy tells Chris that she is pregnant. She returns to Erinsborough for her first scan and Chris decides he wants to split his time between Erinsborough and New York when the baby comes. They also try to find a home for a stray Labrador puppy, after learning that she is descended from Bouncer. Lucy later leaves the dog with Paul. After Chris and Nate break-up, Chris moves to New York with Lucy. A few months later, Lucy and Chris introduce their daughter Anne to Amber Turner (Jenna Rosenow) via an online video call.

Months later, Lucy returns with Annie (Gracie Helen Vine) to oversee the sale of Lassiters Erinsborough. Paul reintroduces her to his daughter Amy Williams (Zoe Cramond) and then makes an offer for the hotel. Terese makes a counteroffer, which Lucy accepts. She then takes her niece Madison Robinson (Sarah Ellen) back to New York with her to oversee the paperwork on Terese's behalf. Madison receives an audition for a singing residency while at Lassiter's Gold Coast courtesy of Lucy. While on the Gold Coast, Lucy and Madison have a catch up. Four years later, Lucy returns to oversee the preparations for the Lassiters wedding expo. She fires Chloe Brennan as the general manager of Lassiters, and reinstates Terese. When Mark returns to Erinsborough as well, the two spend time together and eventually rekindle their relationship. Lucy brings Mark in to assist with the wedding expo preparations, hiring him as a chef, and the two become closer. When Mark learns that Lucy needs to return to the United States for the opening of Lassiters in Las Vegas, he proposes to her and they have a ceremonial wedding on the first day of the expo, before leaving for New York, so Mark can meet Annie, before heading to Las Vegas, and then Paris for their honeymoon.

The following year, Lucy joins a recently separated Paul and Terese in Queensland for a Lassiters conference. Lucy admits she is worried about Paul and how their presentation will go. She later thanks Terese for her work on the presentation and admits that if she had known how bad things with Paul are, she would not have pushed them together. The presentation is a success and Lucy congratulates Paul and Terese. When she visits Paul ahead of his departure, he tells her he just saw their half-brother Glen. Lucy is sceptical and points out that Glen has not been seen in thirty years. She thinks Paul is making up the story in order to stay at the conference and win back Terese. Paul tries to find Glen and admits that he regrets what happened between them. Lucy then tells him that she tried to contact Glen after their father died, but got nowhere. Later that day, Paul brings Glen to the hotel, where he and Lucy greet one another. During their catch up, Glen explains that his paralysis was misdiagnosed and he went through intensive rehabilitation, so he no longer needs a wheelchair. Paul apologises to Glen and hopes he can put things right between them. When he steps outside, Lucy notices Glen is unhappy and he admits that he is recently separated from his wife and it got him thinking about family. He looked Lucy up online and when he learned that she was coming to the conference, he decided to come too. Glen leaves and Paul wonders whether to extend his stay, but Lucy advises him to go home, reminding him that she has Glen's contact details now. Lucy invites Glen and Terese to lunch with her. While Terese is in the bathroom, Glen tells Lucy that he does not trust Paul, even though Lucy thinks he is being genuine. He also warns her that Terese is more vulnerable than everyone thinks. A year later, Lucy returns to Erinsborough to fire Terese from Lassiters after the failed Lassiters Fashion Week costs the hotel a lot of bad publicity. Lucy also bonds with her grandniece, Isla Tanaka-Brennan (Mary Finn), and tells Nicolette Stone (Charlotte Chimes) about Glen and his ex-wife, Karen Constantine (Fiona Jarvis/Amanda LaBonte).

Lucy returns later that year to confirm Paul's sale of Lassiter's to Shane Ramsay (Peter O'Brien), who Lucy catches up with 35 years after last seeing him. Lucy bonds with her niece, Kiri Durant (Jemma Bird Matheson), who she meets for the first time. Lucy invites Chris and Annie (now Harlow Ireland), who arrive a few days later. Lucy introduces Annie to the rest of the family and has a family brunch with the other Robinsons. Lucy is stunned when she learns that Paul rejected Terese's attempts to rekindle their relationship and convinces Paul to speak to her, which he does. Lucy then attends Toadie and Melanie Pearson's (Lucinda Cowden) wedding, then goes to their reception and party on Ramsay Street. She returns for the wedding of Toadie and Terese and then several months later for the funeral of her nephew, David Tanaka (Takaya Honda). Lucy comes back to Erinsborough from New York the following year alongside Annalise to help Lassiters win the Bronze Bell prize. She finds out that Paul has been embezzling company money and bans him from the hotel. She, Annalise and Krista Sinclair (Majella Davis) hold a jewellery exhibition in the Lassiters complex, before Lucy leaves again.

== Reception ==
A writer for the BBC's Neighbours website said Lucy's most notable moments were "Receiving emergency surgery from Clive on the dining table at Number 26. Being almost deafened by Zoe while making a prank call. Being temporarily blinded after falling down a well. Being diagnosed with a brain tumour and becoming an alcoholic." A critic for the Hull Daily Mail was not a fan of the character and hoped the show would get rid of her, as they found her to be annoying. They wrote "Lucy – played by Melissa Bell – just drives me mad the way she always complains and is forever storming off after an argument with boyfriend Brad. Only if she did a Zippy and had her mouth sown up would she become slightly more bearable." In 1993, during a debate on female exploitation, at the Oxford Union with feminists who opposed their argument, Pete Gowers publicly criticised Bell and her character for exploiting their 'assets', stating: "The only character in Neighbours to have a surfboard named after her – because she's good for a ride, but not much else." Zena Alli from What's on TV said that Bell had a "tough time" taking Lucy through her teenage phase noting "the rebel of Ramsay Street had an incestuous relationship with half-brother, Glen, was kidnapped, then broken-hearted soon after the ordeal. Then came the drinking and huge credit card bills. Now, with a modelling contract secured, Lucy's future looks certain."

Critics noted the dramatic image and character change Lucy underwent when Bell (right, in the early 1990s) took over the role from Close (left, in 1987).

In 2008 daily British newspaper The Times profiled 15 top Neighbours moments according to them. On the list Lucy Robinson was noted, they were critical of the character stating that whilst played by Flinker she looked like any ordinary girl, played by Close she was just a 'butch' version of the character. They compared this with Bell's portrayal, stating that she changed the character positively into the 'blonde, busty, saucy Lucy', they also slated her portrayal branding her acting as poor and ruining the character, but added that the positive attribute was she looked like all the other 'blondes' suddenly invading Aussie soaps around the time of the 1990s. Katrina Tweedie from the Daily Record said that Lucy had an "amazing facelift" during the time of her recasting, noting that Lucy had always had short brown hair until Bell took the role.

Ruth Deller of television website Lowculture gave Lucy a 3.5 out of 5 for her contribution to Neighbours, in a feature called "A guide to recognising your Ramsays and Robinsons". Deller said "Lucy's dramatic tenure(s) involved being one of the first of many Ramsay Street residents to fall down a drain and to experience temporary blindness (although she combined the two mishaps), getting sent away to boarding school, engaging in a spot of incest, modelling, marrying a rich older man and having a drugs problem".

In 2010, to celebrate Neighbours' 25th anniversary Sky, a British satellite broadcasting company profiled 25 characters of which they believed were the most memorable in the series history. Lucy is in the list and describing her life in the show they state: "Janine Butcher, Tracy Barlow – you can't have a soap without an oft-recast daughter who swings between 'in control competent woman' and 'nutcase'. Lucy is Neighbours entrant to the list: early on she was an adorable tyke with her puppy Bouncer; then she returned with drug and alcohol problems and a job as a stripper; and finally she became a businesswoman in the Rosemary Daniels mould for subsequent visits". Sally Beck of the Daily Mirror branded her a fesity female complete with "techno" style attire. Media company Virgin Media praised the character stating: "Melissa became a household name as Ramsay Street's Lucy Robinson. Viewers loved her character's close relationship with grandma, Helen Daniels, and her wayward teenage antics." A Sunday World journalist branded her "Jim Robinson's obnoxious daughter".

The Daily Mirror's Mark Dowdney also labelled her a "wild child" character. When asked if viewers should be excited by Lucy's 2013 return, Jon Horsley from Yahoo! TV commented "It'll be nice to see her back – but be warned it may make you feel OLD." An All About Soap reporter described Lucy as a bossy character. An Inside Soap writer observed her Lucy's style upon her 2013 return and concluded that she looked like Pat Butcher (a character from the British soap opera EastEnders, played by Pam St. Clement). A writer from TV Magazine branded Lucy a "Ramsay Street legend" with a "brightly coloured wardrobe". In 2005, Herbison said that Bell's portrayal of Lucy is the one viewers recall the most. Tony Stewart from the Daily Record branded Lucy a "bolshy businesswoman". Lucy was placed at number twenty-two on the Huffpost's "35 greatest Neighbours characters of all time" feature. Of Lucy's recasts, journalist Adam Beresford stated "luckily the third time was the charm and it's blonde Lucy that we most fondly remember." He also branded her a "wild child in her late teens" and assessed that "life’s never dull when Lucy’s in town." A Herald Sun reporter included Lucy's 2015 return for the shows anniversary in their "Neighbours' 30 most memorable moments" feature.
