= Melissa Bell (actor) =

Australian actress and fashion designer (born 1972)

- Born: 7 November 1972 (age 54); Sydney, Australia
- Occupations: Actress, fashion designer
- Years active: 1988–present
- Known for: Neighbours (TV series) as Lucy Robinson; E Street (TV series) as Bonnie Tait; Paradise Beach (TV series) as Emily Harris
- Spouses: Jason Redlich (m. 1996; div. 1998) Gary Dickinson (m. 2000; died 2016) Grant Thompson (m. 2022)
- Children: 4

Melissa Bell (born 7 November 1972) is an Australian actress and fashion designer. She is best known for her roles of Bonnie Tait in E Street, Lucy Robinson in Neighbours, and Emily Harris in Paradise Beach. Bell also made appearances in Home and Away and Water Rats.

== Career ==
Bell's first major television appearance was the guest role of Janine in the soap opera E Street in 1990. She joined the main cast of Neighbours as the third actress to play Lucy Robinson in early 1991. After 18 months of playing Lucy, Bell decided to leave Neighbours. She filmed her final scenes in June 1992. Bell then returned to E Street in the new role of eco-crusader Bonnie Tait, who became a love interest for Bruce Samazan's Max Simmonds. Bell cited homesickness as her reason for leaving Neighbours, which was filmed in Melbourne. She returned to Sydney for E Street and to be closer to her family. After E Street ended Bell made several brief returns to Neighbours. Due to her popularity in the UK, Bell appeared in several pantomimes.

Bell also acted in another soap, Paradise Beach, playing surfer Emily Harris. In 1994, after returning from overseas, Bell secured guest roles in Over the Hill and G.P.. In 1995, she co-wrote the fiction novel Living Famously with television writer and producer Jason Herbison. The following year, she made a guest appearance as Suzie Hudson in an episode of Home and Away. Bell had a regular slot on Sydney radio station Sea FM in the late 1990s. She appears in the 1999 adventure sci-fi film Duran Duran, alongside Rebekah Elmaloglou and Ben Oxenbould.

She appeared in the 2005 lifestyle program Celebrity Overhaul. In 2007, she appeared on Seven Network's Mums and Bubs.

In 1999, Bell developed a range of bath products called Bondi Baby, which were inspired her then two year old son. She also designed her own clothing, which was modelled by actress Kate Ritchie in an issue of TV Week. Bell has since opened and closed a number of fashion boutiques, including Terrigal Babe on the NSW Central Coast, close to where she grew up, a boutique in Double Bay that sold kaftans and party wear, a small boutique called Radical Love on Chevron Island in 2019, and a boutique store called Lilly Blue in Worongary on the Gold Coast.

== Personal life ==
Bell was married to Jason Redlich from 1996 to 1998. They have one son. Following the end of her marriage, Bell suffered from body dysmorphic disorder and depression. In 2000, Bell married Gary Dickinson. They had three children and lived on the Central Coast, NSW. In November 2015, Dickinson, then 57, suffered a heart attack which left him in a coma. Dickinson died on 13 February 2016. In 2020, Bell became engaged to Grant Thompson, and the couple married in 2022, with Bell wearing the dress her Neighbours character wore in her on-screen wedding.

== Filmography ==
=== Film ===
Year	Title	Role	Notes
1998	The Venus Factory	Emily DuBois	
1999	Duran Duran	Echidna	
2012	Housos vs. Authority	Model	
2018	Occupation	Mrs. Kyle	
2021	The Possessed	Helen	

=== Television ===
Year	Title	Role	Notes
1988	Rafferty's Rules	Angela Griffin	Episode: "The Beast"
1990–1991	E Street	Janine	Guest role
1991–1993, 1995, 2005, 2013–2016, 2020–2024, 2025	Neighbours	Lucy Robinson	Main cast
1992–1993	E Street	Bonnie Tait	Main cast
1993–1994	Paradise Beach	Emily Harris	Main cast
1994	G.P.	Rachel Weller	Episode: "Breakfast with Gazza"
1996	Home and Away	Suzie Hudson	Guest role
1998	Water Rats	Lisa Hubbard	Episode: "Untouchable"
